= Dermot Molloy =

Donegal Gaelic footballer

Dermot Brick Molloy
Personal information
- Native name: Diarmuid Bríce Ó Ludhóg (Irish)
- Nickname: Brick
- Born: 1990 or 1991 (age 35–36) County Donegal, Ireland
- Occupation: Student
- Height: 6 ft 0 in (183 cm)

Sport
- Sport: Gaelic football
- Position: Forward
Club
- Years: Club
- ?–: Naomh Conaill
Club titles
- Donegal titles: 7
Inter-county
- Years: County
- 2010–2015: Donegal
Inter-county titles
- Ulster titles: 3
- All-Irelands: 1
- NFL: 1

Dermot "Brick" Molloy (born 1990/1) is a Gaelic footballer who plays forward for Naomh Conaill and also, formerly, for the Donegal county team.

With a half-century of appearances for his county, he played for Donegal in two All-Ireland senior finals. A fixture in the Donegal teams of the Jim McGuinness era, Molloy won an All-Ireland Senior Football Championship title in 2012 and three Ulster Senior Football Championship titles, in 2011, 2012 and 2014.

== Early life ==
He was educated at St Columbas Comprehensive in Glenties. As a ten-year-old he wrote in a scrapbook of his wish to play for Donegal and win an All-Ireland medal.

== Playing career ==
=== Club ===
Molloy has had great success with his club Naomh Conaill, winning Championships at under-age level and then the Donegal Senior Football Championship.

He first encountered McGuinness while with his club and first played under him in 2009, a year in which reached the final of the Donegal Senior Football Championship, but lost.

He captained the Naomh Conaill team that won the Under-21 Football Championship in 2012. He also played in five consecutive Under-21 Football Championship finals, winning three from those five.

Molloy scored 1–4 (including one free) for his club in the final of the 2010 Donegal Senior Football Championship. He then finished top scorer overall in the 2010 Ulster Senior Club Football Championship, during which his club reached the final against Crossmaglen Rangers, but narrowly missed out on winning what would have been the club's first Ulster Football Championship title.

He played for his club in the final of the 2015 Donegal Senior Football Championship. His club won.

He made a substitute appearance for his club in the final of the 2019 Donegal Senior Football Championship. After the first two games finished level, his club won the third game and, with that, the title, Molloy appearing as a substitute in all three games, scoring two points in the second game and no points in the other first and third games.

He made a substitute appearance for his club in the final of the 2020 Donegal Senior Football Championship. His club won, following extra-time and a penalty shoot-out.

He missed his club's 2022 Comórtas Peile na Gaeltachta Donegal Senior semi-final and final wins as they coincided with his stag party.

Then he made a substitute appearance for his club in the final of the 2022 Donegal Senior Football Championship. His club won.

He also had a role in his club's 2023 Donegal Senior Football Championship title win. Though he did not play in the final.

Molloy played for his club in the 2025 Donegal SFC, when his club won the final again, with Molloy making a substitute appearance in that game.

=== Inter-county ===
==== Minor ====
Molloy played minor inter-county football for Donegal in 2008 and 2009.

==== Under-21 ====
Molloy played for the under-21 footballers in 2010, 2011 and 2012, and captained the team in 2012.

He played for Donegal in the 2010 Ulster Under-21 Football Championship campaign, contributing six points (including three frees) to the team's three-point quarter-final victory over Armagh, three points (all frees) to the team's four-point semi-final victory over Derry and either 1–3 or 1–2 (including 1 free) to the team's comprehensive final victory over Cavan, with all three games played at neutral Brewster Park.

He then played in the final of the 2010 All-Ireland Under-21 Football Championship, which Donegal (managed by Jim McGuinness) narrowly lost to Dublin (managed by Jim Gavin), though Molloy scored five points (including four frees).

==== Senior ====
Following the 2010 All-Ireland Under-21 Football Championship final loss, and while returning home to Galway (where he lived with Leo McLoone at the time), Molloy received word that he had been called into the senior county team.

Molloy made his senior inter-county debut against Down in the 2010 Ulster Senior Football Championship quarter-final as a 19-year-old. He scored 1–3 on the day. He was then cited a week later for an incident with Down player Damien Rafferty with a leading elbow. He thus missed Donegal's 2010 All-Ireland Senior Football Championship qualifier match against Armagh in Crossmaglen.

Molloy scored a late goal in the 2011 Ulster Senior Football Championship semi-final victory over Tyrone in Clones. He was an injury doubt ahead of the 2011 All-Ireland Senior Football Championship quarter-final against Kildare.

He was a member of the Donegal panel that won the 2012 All-Ireland Senior Football Championship final against Mayo, coming on as a substitute for Martin McElhinney in injury time in the second half.

Molloy started Rory Gallagher's first match in charge of the county, a 2015 Dr McKenna Cup away defeat to Derry. He left the team later that month, ahead of the start of the 2015 National Football League.

== Honours ==
Donegal

- All-Ireland Senior Football Championship: 2012
- Ulster Senior Football Championship: 2011, 2012, 2014
- National Football League Division 2: 2011
- All-Ireland Under-21 Football Championship runner-up: 2010
- Ulster Under-21 Football Championship: 2010

Naomh Conaill

- Donegal Senior Football Championship: 2010, 2015, 2019, 2020, 2022, 2023, 2025
- Donegal Senior League: 2011
- Donegal Under-21 Football Championship: 2008, 2010, 2012
- Donegal Minor Football Championship: 2009

Individual

- Ulster Gaelic Life Team of the Year: 2010
