= Brendan McDyer =

Donegal Gaelic footballer

Personal information
- Born: 1986 or 1987 (age 38–39)

Sport
- Sport: Gaelic football
Club
- Years: Club
- 200?–: Naomh Conaill
Club titles
- Donegal titles: 8
Inter-county
- Years: County
- 2006–: Donegal

Brendan McDyer (born 1986/7) is an Irish Gaelic footballer who plays for Naomh Conaill and, formerly, the Donegal county team. He is one part of the "usually starting trio" for his club that also includes Leo McLoone and Anthony Thompson.

== Playing career ==
McDyer won his first Donegal Senior Football Championship title with his club in 2005. His free in the 2005 final brought that game to a replay, when he scored 0–3 (including one free). 2005 was also the year he first played for his club in the senior championship.

Brian McIver called McDyer into the Donegal senior panel in December 2005, following the 2005 Donegal SFC title win. When McIver called him into the senior team, McDyer was 18 years of age. McDyer first played for Donegal at senior inter-county level in 2006. He continued to play inter-county football in 2007.

McDyer's club also won the final of the 2010 Donegal Senior Football Championship, with McDyer scoring 0–1 in that game. Naomh Conaill went on to reach the final of the 2010 Ulster Senior Club Football Championship, knocking out Cavan champions Kingscourt, Monaghan champions Clontibret and Tyrone champions Coalisland along the way.

Towards the end of the 2012 Donegal Senior Football Championship final, McDyer tried to pass the ball back to goalkeeper Stephen McGrath, but his action caused Naomh Conaill to concede a '45. This was converted by St Eunan's player Mark McGowan, and Naomh Conaill lost the game by one point.

McDyer played for his club in the final of the 2015 Donegal Senior Football Championship. His club also won this game, with McDyer scoring 0–2. Then he played for his club in the final of the 2019 Donegal Senior Football Championship. His club won, following a second replay; McDyer started all three games and, though he scored 0–1 in the first game, he was held scoreless in the second and third. Then he made a substitute appearance for his club in the 2020 Donegal Senior Football Championship final. His club won, following extra-time and a penalty shoot-out.

Then McDyer played for his club in the 2022 Donegal SFC final. His club won, with McDyer scoring 0–3, though at least one source erroneously said 0–2. He was troubled by injury at the time. On 12 December 2022, McDyer was named as the recipient of the annual Gradam Shéamuis Mhic Géidigh. RTÉ Raidió na Gaeltachta announced the decision. McDyer was not expecting to be selected. He received the award at an official function in Letterkenny on the evening of 14 December 2022. McDyer played for his club in the 2023 Donegal SFC, when his club won the final again, with McDyer scoring 0–1 in that game. McDyer played for his club in the 2025 Donegal SFC, when his club won the final again, with McDyer scoring 0–3 in that game and receiving his eighth winners' medal from 13 appearances in the decider.

== Personal life ==
Though originally from Glenties, as of 2022, McDyer was living in Donegal Town. He is not interested in social media.

== Honours ==
Naomh Conaill

- Ulster Senior Club Football Championship runner-up: 2010, 2019
- Donegal Senior Football Championship: 2005, 2010, 2015, 2019, 2020, 2022, 2023, 2025

Individual

- Gradam Shéamuis Mhic Géidigh: 2022
