= Marty Boyle =

Donegal Gaelic footballer

Personal information
- Height: 6 ft 1 in (185 cm)

Sport
- Sport: Gaelic football
Club
- Years: Club
- ?–: Naomh Conaill
Club titles
- Donegal titles: 7
Inter-county
- Years: County
- 2011?–201?: Donegal
Inter-county titles
- All-Irelands: 1

Marty Boyle is an Irish Gaelic footballer who plays for Naomh Conaill and also, formerly, for the Donegal county team. He played for his county during Jim McGuinness's first spell as manager.

== Playing career ==
Boyle began life as a forward, before retreating towards the backs.

=== Club ===
In 2005, Boyle played for his club in the final of the Donegal Senior Football Championship, as it won its first ever title (after a replay). He played (and scored) for his club in the final of the 2010 Donegal Senior Football Championship. He then played for his club in the final of the 2015 Donegal Senior Football Championship.

He also played for his club in the final of the 2019 Donegal Senior Football Championship. His club won, following a second replay.

He made a substitute appearance for his club in the final of the 2020 Donegal Senior Football Championship. His club won, following extra-time and a penalty shoot-out.

Then he made another substitute appearance for his club in the final of the 2022 Donegal Senior Football Championship. His club won.

Ahead of the 2023 final, Boyle (alongside Stephen McGrath, Anthony Thompson, Leo McLoone and Eoin Waide) was recognised for making a 100th club championship appearance. He had made that appearance in the 2022 Donegal SFC quarter-final victory over Glenswilly. Boyle did not play in the final at all.

=== Inter-county ===
Jim McGuinness called Boyle into the Donegal senior team ahead of the 2011 Dr McKenna Cup following his club's 2010 Donegal SFC title win. He received his first championship start in the 2011 Ulster Senior Football Championship quarter-final against Cavan at Breffni Park, with Frank McGlynn absent due to a torn hamstring. In the 2011 All-Ireland Senior Football Championship semi-final, Dublin player Diarmuid Connolly punched Boyle in the face and then grabbed him by the throat; Connolly was red carded as a result. Boyle sat on the bench during Donegal's 2012 All-Ireland Senior Football Championship Final win.

== Honours ==
Donegal

- All-Ireland Senior Football Championship: 2012
- Ulster Senior Football Championship: 2011, 2012
- National Football League Division 2: 2011

Naomh Conaill

- Donegal Senior Football Championship: 2005, 2010, 2015, 2019, 2020, 2022, 2023
