= Eoin Waide =

Donegal Gaelic footballer

Sport
- Sport: Gaelic football
Clubs
- Years: Club
- ?– c. 2008: Naomh Conaill; Donegal Boston
Club titles
- Donegal titles: 7
Inter-county
- Years: County
- ?–?: Donegal
Inter-county titles
- Ulster titles: Yes

Eoin Waide is an Irish Gaelic footballer who plays for Naomh Conaill and also, formerly, for the Donegal county team.

He also played Sigerson Cup football.

== Playing career ==
Waide was involved with the Donegal senior team during the 2000s and 2010s under three different managers: John Joe Doherty, Jim McGuinness and Rory Gallagher.

Waide captained Donegal in the final and scored three points as the team won their first Ulster minor title in 10 years at Croke Park in 2006. In 2009, he made substitute appearances for the Donegal senior team in the second halves of their championship victory over Galway at Markievicz Park and their defeat to Cork at Croke Park. He was injured in 2012.

In 2005, Waide played for his club in the final of the Donegal Senior Football Championship. His club won, after a replay.

He also played for his club in the final of the 2010 Donegal Senior Football Championship. His club won.

He then played for his club in the final of the 2015 Donegal Senior Football Championship. His club won.

He then played for his club in the final of the 2019 Donegal Senior Football Championship (the first two games of three). After the first two games finished level, his club won the third game and, with that, the title.

He also played for his club in the final of the 2020 Donegal Senior Football Championship. His club won, following extra-time and a penalty shoot-out.

Then he played for his club in the final of the 2022 Donegal Senior Football Championship. His club won.

He also played for his club in the final of the 2023 Donegal Senior Football Championship, appearing as a substitute in this one. His club won. This was his nineteenth season with his club, and though he was not often starting games, because of injury, he would often appear later on. Ahead of the 2023 final, Waide (alongside Marty Boyle, Stephen McGrath, Anthony Thompson and Leo McLoone) was recognised for making a 100th club championship appearance.

He played for Donegal Boston in 2008.

== Honours ==
Naomh Conaill

- Donegal Senior Football Championship: 2005, 2010, 2015, 2019, 2020, 2022, 2023
- 2x Donegal Minor Football Championship
- 3x Donegal Under-21 Football Championship
- 2x Donegal Senior League
- 3x Donegal Gaeltachts
- 2x All-Ireland Gaeltachts

Donegal

- Ulster Senior Football Championship
- National Football League Division 2: 2011
- Dr McKenna Cup: 2009, 2010
- Ulster Minor Football Championship: 2006 (c.)
- Ulster Minor Football League
