= Naomh Conaill CLCG =

Donegal-based Gaelic games club

- Naomh Conaill CLCG
- Founded: 1921
- County: Donegal
- Nickname: "Boys in Blue"
- Colours: Blue and white
- Grounds: Davy Brennan Memorial Park (Pairc Daithí Ó Braonáin)
- Coordinates: 54.7956°N 8.2945°W

Playing kits
Standard colours

Senior Club Championships
| | All Ireland | Ulster champions | Donegal champions |
|---|---|---|---|
| Football: | - | - | 8 |

Naomh Conaill CLCG is a GAA club for the Glenties parish in south-west County Donegal. As well as the town of Glenties, the club also covers the area to the village of Fintown and the areas of Kilraine, The Glen and Maas down to the Gweebara Bridge. Much of this area lies within the Donegal Gaeltacht area.

Naomh Conaill is one of the strongholds of Gaelic football in County Donegal. The club has eight Donegal Senior Football Championship titles, all won since 2005. It reached the Ulster Senior Club Football Championship final in 2010 and 2019.

The club is its reigning County Senior Football Champions, having beaten Gaoth Dobhair in the 2025 final. The current football manager is Martin Regan.

== History ==
=== Early history ===
The club was formed in 1921 — before this time other sports were played in the area, especially association football (or "soccer", as it is known). The earliest record of Gaelic games in the area came from 1905, when a hurling match took place between Kilraine and Brackey (Ardara). This predates the organisation of Donegal GAA in 1906, the foundation of which was influenced by Alex McDyer (he became secretary), who jointly arranged this 1905 match and played in the first recorded Donegal team in 1906.
The club played its first match on 24 July 1921, between local teams — "The Town" and Kilraine. Friendly matches between Clady and Dungloe followed in the same year. A first appearance in the Donegal Senior Football Championship (SFC) final followed, with a defeat to Castlefin; according to the Donegal Democrat, the score is uncertain, but Castlefin won by three points. The following year the final between Ard an Rátha and Ballybofey was played in Glenties. From its foundation up until the late 1970s, the club was usually referred to as Glenties (Na Gleanntaí), although through an amalgamation with the Fintown GAA club, it has since been referred to as Naomh Conaill.

Following this initial final appearance, the remainder of the 1920s did not yield any further documented success. However, there is a suggestion that the club won a Junior Football Championship (JFC) title in 1928. The early 1930s saw the club having further county final defeats at the new under-18 (minor) grade, losing to Letterkenny in the Donegal Minor Football Championship (MFC) final; then, in the first documented JFC final in 1932, to Erin's Hope (Stranorlar) by a point. However, success followed the next year in the JFC final against Tamhnach na Mhullaigh, with the final score Na Gleanntai 0–2, Tamhnach na Mhullaigh 0–1. As well as these MFC and JFC finals, the club also contested the 1938 and 1939 MFC finals, losing the former to St Eunan's by 2–2 to 1–3, but winning the latter, its first Donegal MFC title, by a scoreline of 2–2 to Ballyshannon's 0–2.

=== 1940–1959 ===
At the start of the 1940s the club continued to feature in county finals. In 1941, it contested both the SFC and MFC finals, winning neither. The Donegal SFC final was lost by the narrowest of margins to Gaoth Dobhair (played in Dungloe); Gaoth Dobhair was a prominent club in Donegal football at the time, contesting seven SFC finals in the 1940s, and losing only once.

This was the club's first championship meeting with Gaoth Dobhair; the club would play Gaoth Dobhair nine more times in the championship during the twentieth century (1941–1979), losing all ten games.

The chance to contest another SFC final came the following year, in a game that was played in Ardara. Again, though, Glenties lost, and Ballyshannon received the cup. A few of the club's players from this period wore the green and gold of the Donegal county team in the Ulster Senior Football Championship, notably Columba McDyre and Davy Brennan (after whom the club's home ground is named). Columba later gained further recognition as the first Donegal man to win an All-Ireland Senior Football Championship winners' medal, when he lined out for Cavan in the 1947 final, which was played at the Polo Grounds in New York City.

In 1945, the club won a second MFC title, defeating Gaoth Dobhair in the final by a scoreline of 0–9 to 1–5. The club reached the MFC final in 1947, but lost to a St Eunan's team that was on its second leg of a three-in-a-row victory. As the 1940s ended, the club reached a sixth county decider, this time at the junior grade, but was unsuccessful.

The 1950s were a lean period for the club, with no titles won. In 1957, St Rian's Camogie Club was formed in Glenties. It lost to Glenfin in its first game and later lost the Junior Championship semi-final to Castlefin.

=== 1960–1970 ===
The 1960s saw a second peak in the club's history, with ten finals contested across the decade. Following a final defeat in 1958, 1961 gave the club another chance to win the under-16 title, but defeat to Bundoran followed. The next year the club made up for that defeat to Bundoran by beating them to the 1962 MFC title, by a scoreline of 2–3 to 0–1. The club qualified for the 1963 MFC final also, but was unable to defend its title successfully, and Ballyshannon took it. That year also saw the club contest the JFC final; however, Convoy won the cup. The following year brought victory over Castlefin in the JFC final, by a scoreline of 1–9 to 0–3. Also, a first Division 2 League title was secured in the 1963–64 season. In 1964, the club won the Devine Cup, a competition hosted annually by Aghyaran St Davogs's GFC.

Building on the successes at minor and junior grades, the club qualified for its fourth appearance in the SFC decider in 1965. In a very close-run final, the game ended as a draw: Na Gleantaí 0–10, St Joseph's 1–7 (St Joseph's was an amalgamated team, consisting of Ballyshannon and Bundoran). The replay, however, did not go the club's way.

The club's captain at the time was the father of Leo McLoone; McLoone Jnr would captain the club to a Donegal SFC fifty years later, in 2015. Also playing for the club in the 1965 final was Josie Mac Ceallabhuí, grandfather of Jeaic Mac Ceallabhuí.

Following 1965, the club had to wait until 1968 to contest another county final. Repeat visits to under-16 and minor finals came in the following years. The club won its first under-16 title in 1968. But, the next year, the club's bid to retain the title ended with a final defeat to Droim Barr. In the same year the club reached the MFC final, as part of a joint team with neighbouring club (and local rival) Ard an Rátha; the amalgamated team won by eight points. This team then successfully defended the title in 1970, by defeating Buncrana.

=== 1971–1989 ===
The club's strong underage teams were again prominent in the early seventies. 1971 saw two finals contested by Na Gleanntaí, with mixed success. The under-16 team won the club's second county title at that grade, comprehensively defeating Urris. The second final of 1971 was at the under-21 grade (the first year this grade was played), but Gaoth Dobhair secured the title with a two-point victory. 1972 saw the club contest the Democrat Cup Final (Division 1 League) for the first time, but St Joseph's won that title. Underage teams came to the fore again in 1973 as the club reached the under-14 and under-16 finals, but neither title was won.

A first football title for the club at senior level came in 1974, with the club winning the Donegal Senior Comórtas Peile na Gaeltachta; Naomh Conaill was, however, unsuccessful at the All-Ireland Comórtas Peile na Gaeltachta in that year. In that same year, the club made a second appearance in the under-21 final; however, Cill Chartha won. The club made its first appearance in an under-12 final in 1976, but Ballyshannon won the title with a one-point victory. A wait of eight years followed until the club's next county final appearance, this time at the under-14 grade. A strong St Eunan's team was victorious in Ballybofey (as had happened in 1973). At this time the club's senior (first team) was playing in the Donegal Intermediate Football Championship (IFC), and, in 1986, secured a final appearance against An Clochán Liath in Ardara. Despite a good performance, An Clochán Liath won the cup. After a long wait from 1974 onwards, the club started to see some success in the late 1980s. A second Division 2 League title was secured in the 1988 campaign, with a Division 3 Shield following the next year.

The mid-1980s saw the creation of 'B' Championships at under-12 and under-14 grades, and these new competitions gave the club new opportunities to develop its underage teams following a fallow period. In the second year of the U-14B Championship (1988), Naomh Conaill won the trophy, beating Termon in Ballybofey. The following year, Naomh Conaill won the U-12B Championship, after a replay held at the old O'Donnell Park in Letterkenny. The first game with Buncrana had finished level, at 2–3 each.

In the late 1980s the club also fielded a camogie team, who won two intermediate county titles in 1988 by 1–0 to 0–0 (against Four Masters), and in 1989 by 3–1 to 2–1 (against Glenfin) in Glenfin.

=== 1990–1999: IFC ===
Naomh Conaill won the 1990 IFC final against Bundoran, a first county championship victory for the club's senior team. Another Division 2 Shield title was added in 1992. As well as being the year Donegal won the Sam Maguire Cup for the first time, 1992 also saw Naomh Conaill win an All-Ireland title in Scór na-nÓg; in the ballad group category. The team was composed of Shauna Ward, Eileen Rafferty, Tara Connaghan, Helena Bonner, Brenda Mc Elhinney, and mentored by Jim Rafferty.

The mid-1990s marked the start of an upturn in the club's fortunes, initially at underage level. By 1995 the "B" championships had been renamed A2 championships; Naomh Conaill secured both the Minor A2 and the U-12 A2 Championships at the expense of Cill Chartha and Glenfin, after a replay (the first game had ended 2–9 to 3–6), respectively. Naomh Conaill had mixed fortunes in 1997, losing the U-14 A2 Championship to Downings, but winning the U-13 A2 at the expense of Gaeil Fhánada.

The club won its first Division 1 Shield title in 1995, and more significantly, success in the Senior Donegal Gaeltacht Championship was gained in the following year. A long-awaited return to success in the premier championship grades was fulfilled in 1998, when the club secured a first U-12 Championship, beating near neighbours Ard an Rátha. This was followed by a hat-trick of Óg-sport Gael titles in 1999, 2000 and 2001.

=== 2000–2009: First SFC ===
In 2005, Naomh Conaill won the Donegal SFC (Dr Maguire Cup) for the first time. During the first decade of the 21st-century, the club contested county finals in each year, with unparalleled success at various grades.

After the club's 2005 Donegal SFC title win, Brendan McDyer, Anthony Thompson and Leon Thompson were called up to the Donegal senior squad for the first time, while Paddy Campbell and Thomas Donoghue were also involved, at a time when Brian McIver was manager.

Building on the underage success of the late-1990s, the club experienced continued good fortunes, winning the under-12 A2 and óg-spórt county titles in successive years. In both 2000 and 2001, the club contested finals at Minor A2, under-14 (2000) and under-16 (2001), failing on each occasion. 2002 saw Naomh Conaill contest its second Democrat Cup final; the club won this cup for the first time, at the expense of St Eunan's. The following year saw the club win its first Minor League (A1) title, but a first appearance in the Senior Reserve Championship final ended in defeat to Gaoth Dobhair. However, the same year, the club won its first MFC as a single club since 1962.

2004 saw the club retain the MFC, the first time a top grade football championship was held for more than one year (excluding combined teams). Then, in 2005, came Naomh Conaill's finest hour; winning a first SFC title, at the fifth time of asking. The club's first appearance in the Ulster Senior Club Football Championship ended at Mayobridge (County Down), Score: Mayobridge 0–10 Naomh Conaill 1–5.

The success of 2005 gave way to an unprecedented five county finals in 2006, only one success came at under-21 level (defeats came in the Reserve SFC, MFC, under-13 and Division 1B League). The club won a second installment of an under-21 three-in-a-row in 2007, as was a second Minor A1 league title. Naomh Conaill was unable to overcome the challenge of Four Masters in the MFC. St Eunan's were the victors in the under-16 decider. More records were broken the following year with a third U-21 Championship in three years.

A sixth appearance in the SFC final in 2009, ended in defeat to St Eunan's. Apart from this, 2009 featured under-12 and MFC titles, and final defeats in the under-21 (thus denying the club a four-in-a-row string of victories), Minor league and division 5 county final. The minor team lost out at the quarter-final stage of the Ulster Club Championship to Belcoo after extra time. As 2009 closed, and following a club record six county finals, the club had made much progress over the previous 89 years.

=== 2010–2018: Second and third SFCs ===
Naomh Conaill won the 2010 Donegal Senior Football Championship, with Leo McLoone in inspired form. The club defeated Na Cealla Beaga in the final, held at MacCumhaill Park, Ballybofey. Then they beat Cavan champions Kingscourt in the Ulster Championship preliminary round and beat Monaghan champions Clontibret O'Neills in the first round proper to set up a semi-final against Tyrone champions Coalisland.

The club took on old rival St Eunan's in the 2012 Donegal Senior Football Championship final. In an even game Naomh Conaill lost by one point, after a late Mark McGowan '45.

The club contested the 2015 Donegal Senior Football Championship final against St Eunan's by a single point. Tyrone champions Trillick saw off Naomh Conaill in the first round of the Ulster Senior Club Football Championship.

The club's minor team won the 2016 MFC title against St Eunan's by a scoreline of 1–11 to 0–11 in Convoy.

=== 2019–present: Five more SFCs ===
"If they are beaten, they don't blame the management or referees or officialdom or the weather. They look at themselves and see what they could do better... They are so humble. People used to say to me on the sideline that they are a shower of this and that, and it really couldn't be any further from the truth. When they win finals or big games, you won't see anything on social media. Some teams go on like they have won the World Cup. The boys will go back to Glenties, they will give each pub their fair share and there will be no fuss made".

– Michael McLaughlin, who spent four years working under Martin Regan's management of the Naomh Conaill senior team, speaks about them ahead of the 2023 Donegal Senior Football Championship final

In 2019, Naomh Conaill won a fourth SFC title, doing so after a three-game final against Gaoth Dobhair, with only a point separating the clubs at the end of the third game.

The 2019 Ulster Senior Club Football Championship included a semi-final victory against Clontibret. The final was against Kilcoo.

The 2020 Donegal SFC concluded in 2021, with Naomh Conaill winning a fifth SFC title.

In 2022, Naomh Conaill won a sixth SFC title, in controversial circumstances, and by one point, after St Eunan's player Shane O'Donnell was sent off for patting Jeaic Mac Ceallabhuí.

In 2023, Naomh Conaill won a seventh SFC title. They did so with players Marty Boyle, Brendan McDyer, Leo McLoone, Anthony Thompson and Eoin Waide all still there from the 2005 team that won the club's first SFC title.

The club was drawn to play Gowna in the quarter-final of the 2023 Ulster Senior Club Football Championship. Naomh Conaill entered the match as favourite and duly delivered victory at Breffni Park, with Gowna conceding a late free which resulted in a goal scored with nearly the last kick of the match. RTÉ televised the semi-final. Naomh Conaill lost to a late point.

In 2025, Naomh Conaill won an eighth SFC title. Brendan McDyer, Leo McLoone and Anthony Thompson each received an eighth winners' medal from 13 appearances in the decider.

== Club grounds ==
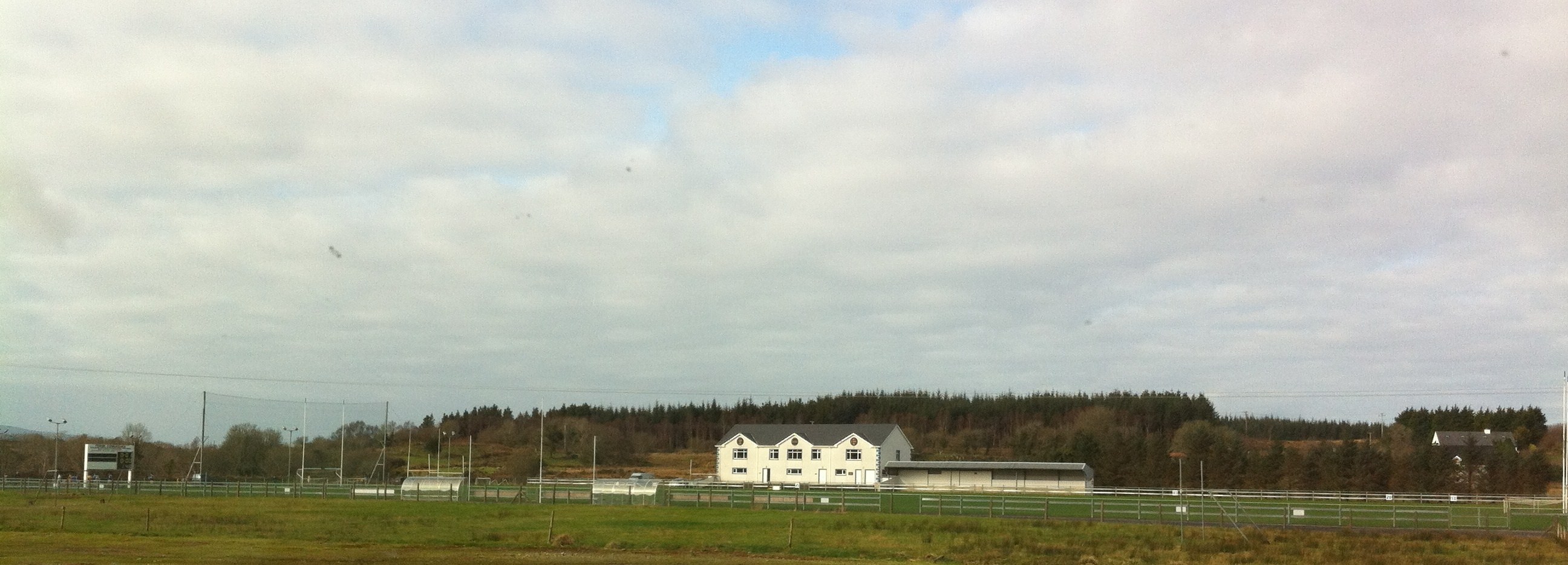
Davy Brennan Memorial Park, 2012

The club has used a number of different playing fields in its history, before establishing the current Davy Brennan Memorial Park club grounds at Carrickbrack 1971. The club has hosted the Donegal Senior Football Championship final on 12 occasions: in 1923, 1928, 1931, 1935, 1937, 1938, 1944, 1949, 1951, 1955, 1957 and 1973.

== Notable players ==
- Columba McDyer — 1947 All-Ireland Senior Football Championship winner (with Cavan)
- Marty Boyle — 2012 All-Ireland Senior Football Championship winner
- Paddy Campbell — 2007 National Football League winner
- Eunan Doherty
- Thomas Donoghue — 2007 National Football League winner
- John Gildea — played in the 2003 All-Ireland Senior Football Championship semi-final, when he was Donegal's most senior player
- Jeaic Mac Ceallabhuí — 2025 All-Ireland Senior Football Championship runner-up
- Brendan McDyer
- Eoghan McGettigan — 2025 All-Ireland Senior Football Championship runner-up
- Charles McGuinness — nephew of Jim and 2025 All-Ireland Senior Football Championship runner-up
- Jim McGuinness — uncle of Charles
- Johnny McLoone
- Leo McLoone — 2012 All-Ireland Senior Football Championship winner
- Dermot Molloy — 2012 All-Ireland Senior Football Championship winner
- Ethan O'Donnell
- Finnbarr Roarty — 2025 All-Ireland Senior Football Championship runner-up
- Anthony Thompson — 2012 All-Ireland Senior Football Championship winner
- Ciarán Thompson — 2025 All-Ireland Senior Football Championship runner-up
- Leon Thompson — 2007 National Football League winner and 2014 All-Ireland Senior Football Championship runner-up
- Eoin Waide

== Managers ==
| Years | Manager |
|---|---|
| 200?–200? | — |
| c. 2005 | Hughie Molloy and Jim McGuinness |
| 200?–200? | — |
| c. 2009/2010 | Cathal Corey and Jim McGuinness |
| c. 2012–201? | Martin Doherty and Stephen McKelvey |
| 2013–201? | Paddy Campbell |
| 2015– | Martin Regan (with Martin Doherty in 2016) |

== Chairmen ==
The following men have been chairman of the club.

| Years | Chairman |
|---|---|
| 1921–?? | — |
| ?–present | David Kelch |

== Table of County Final results ==
| Year | Grade/Level | Champion | Runner-up |
|---|---|---|---|
| 1921 | Senior Championship | Castlefin by 3 points | Na Gleanntaí |
| 1931 | Minor Championship | Letterkenny 2-5 | Na Gleanntaí 0-4 |
| 1932 | Junior Championship | Erin's Hope 1-2 | Na Gleanntaí 0-4 |
| 1933 | Junior Championship | Na Gleanntaí 0-2 | Tamhnach na Mhullaigh 0-1 |
| 1938 | Minor Championship | St Eunan's 2-2 | Na Gleanntaí 1-3 |
| 1939 | Minor Championship | Na Gleanntaí 2-2 | Ballyshannon 0-2 |
| 1941 | Senior Championship | Gaoth Dobhair 0-10 | Na Gleanntaí 2-3 |
| 1941 | Minor Championship | St Eunan's 2-7 | Na Gleanntaí 1-4 |
| 1942 | Senior Championship | Ballyshannon 2-8 | Na Gleanntaí 1-4 |
| 1945 | Minor Championship | Na Gleanntaí 0-9 | Gaoth Dobhair 1-5 |
| 1947 | Minor Championship | St Eunan's 3-5 | Na Gleanntaí 1-3 |
| 1949 | Junior Championship | Lios Cuaille 1-6 | Na Gleanntaí 0-7 |
| 1953 | Minor Championship | Ruagairí na Rossan 4-13 | Na Gleanntaí 2-6 |
| 1958 | U-16 Championship | Gaoth Dobhair 1-4 | Na Gleanntaí 0-3 |
| 1961 | U-16 Championship | Bundoran 0-8 | Na Gleanntaí 0-1 |
| 1962 | Minor Championship | Na Gleanntaí 2-3 | Bundoran 0-1 |
| 1963 | Minor Championship | Ballyshannon 2-6 | Na Gleanntaí 1-6 |
| 1963 | Junior Championship | Convoy 2-7 | Na Gleanntaí 1-6 |
| 1964 | Junior Championship | Na Gleanntaí 1-9 | Castlefin 0-3 |
| 1965 | Senior Championship | St Joseph's (1-7) 1-11 | Na Gleanntaí (0-10) 0-10 |
| 1968 | U-16 Championship | Na Gleanntaí 0-10 | Seán Mac Cumhaills 0-6 |
| 1969 | U-16 Championship | Droim Barr 2-11 | Na Gleanntaí 0-9 |
| 1969 | Minor Championship | Na Gleanntaí/Ard an Rátha 2-10 | Naomh Micheál 2-2 |
| 1970 | Minor Championship | Na Gleanntaí/Ard an Rátha 1-9 | Buncranna 1-5 |
| 1971 | U-16 Championship | Na Gleanntaí 3-9 | Urris 1-3 |
| 1971 | U-21 Championship | Gaoth Dobhair 3-6 | Na Gleanntaí 2-7 |
| 1973 | U-16 Championship | Seán Mac Cumhaills 1-7 | Na Gleanntaí 2-0 |
| 1973 | U-14 Championship | St Eunan's 8-12 | Na Gleanntaí 2-2 |
| 1974 | U-21 Championship | Kilcar 2-8 | Na Gleanntaí 0-4 |
| 1976 | U-12 Championship | Ballyshannon 2-3 | Na Gleanntaí 1-5 |
| 1984 | U-14 Championship | St Eunan's 4-13 | Naomh Conaill 2-6 |
| 1986 | Intermediate Championship | An Clochán Liath 0-8 | Naomh Conaill 0-6 |
| 1988 | U-14B Championship | Naomh Conaill 2-8 | Termon 1-4 |
| 1989 | U-12B Championship | Naomh Conaill 3-9 (2-3) | Buncrana 2-3 (2-3) |
| 1990 | Intermediate Championship | Naomh Conaill 2-12 | Bundoran 2-10 |
| 1995 | U-12 A2 Championship | Naomh Conaill 1-13 (2-9) | Glenfin 1-11 (3-6) |
| 1995 | Minor A2 Championship | Naomh Conaill 1-10 | Kilcar 1-5 |
| 1997 | U-13 A2 Championship | Naomh Conaill 4-10 | Fanad Gaels 2-1 |
| 1997 | U-14 A2 Championship | Downings 1-13 | Naomh Conaill 0-5 |
| 1998 | U-12 Championship | Naomh Conaill 4-16 | Ard an Rátha 6-5 |
| 2000 | Minor A2 Championship | Burt 2-4 | Naomh Conaill 0-3 |
| 2000 | U-14 Championship | Ballyshannon 5-8 | Naomh Conaill 0-13 |
| 2000 | U-12 A2 Championship | Naomh Conaill 4-8 | Convoy 3-7 |
| 2001 | U-12 A2 Championship | Naomh Conaill 6-11 | St Michael's 4-6 |
| 2001 | U-16 Championship | Buncrana 4-12 | Naomh Conaill 2-8 |
| 2002 | Democrat Cup | Naomh Conaill 0-13 | St Eunan's 0-9 |
| 2003 | Minor Championship | Naomh Conaill 1-11 | Buncrana 2-5 |
| 2003 | minor (A1 division) league | Naomh Conaill 4-7 | Glenfin 1-12 |
| 2003 | Senior Reserve Championship | Gaoth Dobhair 1-10 | Naomh Conaill 1-6 |
| 2004 | Minor Championship | Naomh Conaill 0-8 (2-5) | Kilcar 0-6 (0-11) |
| 2005 | Senior Championship | Naomh Conaill 0-10 (1-5) | St Eunan's 1-5 (0-8) |
| 2006 | U-21 Championship | Naomh Conaill 1-9 | Na Cealla Beaga 0-9 |
| 2006 | Senior Reserve Championship | Gaoth Dobhair 1-9 | Naomh Conaill 0-6 |
| 2006 | Minor Championship | Na Cealla Beaga 2-9 | Naomh Conaill 0-11 |
| 2006 | U-13 Championship | Ard an Rátha 4-3 | Naomh Conaill 1-7 |
| 2006 | League Division 1B | An Clochán Liath 1-11 | Naomh Conaill 2-6 |
| 2007 | U-21 Championship | Naomh Conaill 3-12 | Ard an Rátha 1-9 |
| 2007 | minor (A1 division) league | Naomh Conaill 1-10 | Cloughaneely 1-5 |
| 2007 | Minor Championship | Four Masters 1-7 | Naomh Conaill 1-5 |
| 2007 | U-16 Championship | St Eunan's 2-13 | Naomh Conaill 1-10 |
| 2008 | U-21 Championship | Naomh Conaill 0-11 | St Eunan's 0-4 |
| 2009 | Senior Championship | St Eunan's 0-13 | Naomh Conaill 0-7 |
| 2009 | Minor Championship | Naomh Conaill 1-14 | St Eunan's 0-11 |
| 2009 | U-12 Championship | Naomh Conaill 3-12 | St Eunan's 2-6 |
| 2009 | Division 5 county final | Malin 1-9 | Naomh Conaill 1-6 |
| 2009 | Minor (A1 division) league | Bundoran 2-9 | Naomh Conaill 2-6 |
| 2009 | U-21 Championship | St Michael's 0-13 | Naomh Conaill 0-6 |
| 2010 | Senior Championship | Naomh Conaill 1-15 | Na Cealla Beaga 0-8 |
| 2012 | Senior Championship | St Eunan's 1-07 | Naomh Conaill 0-09 |
| 2015 | Senior Championship | Naomh Conaill 0-11 | St Eunan's 0-10 |
| 2018 | Senior Championship | Gaoth Dobhair 0-17 | Naomh Conaill 1-7 |
| 2019 | Senior Championship | Naomh Conaill 0-8 | Gaoth Dobhair 0-8 |
| 2019 REPLAY | Senior Championship | Naomh Conaill 1-11 | Gaoth Dobhair 0-14 |
| 2019 REPLAY | Senior Championship | Naomh Conaill 0-8 | Gaoth Dobhair 0-7 |
| 2020 | Senior Championship | Naomh Conaill 0-13 (AET; Naomh Conaill won 4-2 on penalties) | Kilcar 2-7 |
| 2022 | Senior Championship | Naomh Conaill 1-9 | St Eunan's 2-5 |

== Honours ==
Football (Note: The Under-16 and Minor championship wins in the 1960s and 1970s were won as part of an Ardara/Glenties amalgamation.)

- Donegal Senior Football Championship: 2005, 2010, 2015, 2019, 2020, 2022, 2023, 2025
- Donegal Senior Football League (Democrat Cup): 2002, 2012, 2021
- Donegal Intermediate Football Championship: 1990
- Donegal Junior Football Championship: 1928 (possibly), 1933, 1964
- Donegal Senior Football League Div. 2: 1963–64, 1977, 1988
- Donegal Football Shield Div. 1: 1995
- Donegal Football Shield Div. 2: 1992
- Donegal Football Shield Div. 3: 1989
- Donegal Under-21 Football Championship: 2006, 2007, 2008, 2010, 2012
- Donegal Under-18 [Minor] Football Championship: 1939, 1945, 1962, 1969, 1970, 2003, 2004, 2009, 2016
- Donegal Under-18 A2 Football Championship: 1995
- Donegal Minor Football Leagues: 2003, 2007, 2016 (Regional and Divisional)
- Donegal Under-16 Football Championship: 1968, 1971
- INTO 7-aside Football skills: 1990
- Óg Spórt Gaels: 1999, 2000, 2001
- Donegal Under-14B Football Championship: 1988
- Donegal Under-13 A2 Football Championship: 1997
- Donegal Under-12 Football Championship: 1998, 2009
- Donegal Under-12 A2 [formerly B] Football Championship: 1989, 1995, 2000, 2001
- Comórtas Peile na Gaeltachta Dhún na nGall - Sinsír: 1974, 1996, 2015, 2022, 2023
- Comórtas Peile na Gaeltachta na hÉireann - Sinsír: 2015, 2016
- Glen McGinty Cup [Junior Football]: 1990

Camogie

- Donegal Intermediate Camogie Championship: 1988, 1989
