= 2023 Donegal Senior Football Championship =

Donegal S.F.C.
- Season: 2023
- Champions: Naomh Conaill (7th title)
- Relegated: Milford
- Winning captain: Ultan Doherty
- Man of the Match: Ethan O'Donnell
- Winning manager: Martin Regan

The 2023 Donegal Senior Football Championship was the 101st official edition of Donegal GAA's premier Gaelic football tournament for senior graded clubs in County Donegal. 16 teams competed, with the winner representing Donegal in the Ulster Senior Club Football Championship.

Naomh Conaill was defending champion after defeating St Eunan's in the 2022 final. Naomh Conaill again advanced to the 2023 final, where the club defeated Gaoth Dobhair to retain the title.

Cloich Cheann Fhaola's home defeat of Milford marked the first time in twelve years that the club had won a senior championship game. Two weeks after that, the club defeated Four Masters as well.

The competition's top scorer was Oisín Gallen, with 1–56.

== Team changes ==
The following teams changed division since the 2022 championship season.

=== To S.F.C. ===
Promoted from 2022 Donegal I.F.C.

- An Clochán Liath - (I.F.C. Champions)

=== From S.F.C. ===
Relegated to 2023 Donegal I.F.C.

- Réalt na Mara

== League phase ==
Pos	Team	P	W	L	D	F	A	PD	Pts	Qualification or relegation
1	Aodh Ruadh Ballyshannon	4	4	0	0	44	26	+18	8	Advance to quarter-finals
2	St Eunan's	4	3	0	1	62	26	+37	7	Advance to quarter-finals
3	Naomh Conaill	4	3	0	1	60	36	+24	7	Advance to quarter-finals
4	Cill Chartha	4	3	0	1	65	49	+16	7	Advance to quarter-finals
5	Gleann tSúilí	4	3	1	0	63	48	+15	6	Advance to preliminary quarter-finals
6	Gaoth Dobhair	4	3	1	0	50	40	+11	6	Advance to preliminary quarter-finals
7	Seán Mac Cumhaills	4	2	1	1	63	59	+4	5	Advance to preliminary quarter-finals
8	Cloich Cheann Fhaola	4	2	2	0	50	49	+1	4	Advance to preliminary quarter-finals
9	Ard an Rátha	4	2	2	0	44	71	-27	4	Advance to preliminary quarter-finals
10	Four Masters	4	1	2	1	40	43	-3	3	Advance to preliminary quarter-finals
11	An Clochán Liath	4	1	3	0	43	52	-9	2	Advance to preliminary quarter-finals
12	Gleann Fhinne	4	1	3	0	44	58	-14	2	Advance to preliminary quarter-finals
13	St Naul's	4	1	3	0	52	67	-15	2	Advance to relegation playoff
14	St Michael's	4	0	3	1	28	46	-18	1	Advance to relegation playoff
15	Na Cealla Beaga	4	0	4	0	43	63	-20	0	Advance to relegation playoff
16	Milford	4	0	4	0	38	57	-19	0	Advance to relegation playoff

== Preliminary quarter-finals ==
Teams ranked 5–12 were paired up based on league phase ranking for the preliminary quarter-finals, which were played at neutral venues

23 September 2023; 14:30; Preliminary quarter-final	Glenswilly	1–16 — 0–10	Gleann Fhinne	O'Donnell Park; Referee: Robbie O'Donnell (Naomh Muire)
23 September 2023; 14:30; Preliminary quarter-final	Donal Gallagher 1–1; Jack Gallagher 0–1; Michael Murphy 0–5,1f,1m,1’45; Caoimhin Marley 0–3,1m; Daithi Gildea 0–1; Mark McAteer 0–1; Gary McFadden 0–2,2f; Keelan Dunleavy 0–1; Caolan Kelly 0–1	Report	Luke McGlynn 0–4,2f; Daniel Marley 0–4,3f; Ross Marley 0–1; Shaun Ward 0–1,1f	O'Donnell Park; Referee: Robbie O'Donnell (Naomh Muire)

23 September 2023; 16:00; Preliminary quarter-final	Ard an Rátha]	2–13 — 0–10	Cloich Cheann Fhaola	O'Donnell Park; Referee: James Connors (St Eunan's)
23 September 2023; 16:00; Preliminary quarter-final	John Ross Molloy 1–1; CJ Molloy 0–1,1m; Karl Joseph Molloy 1–8,4f; Kevin Whyte 0–2; Shane Whyte 0–1	Report	Blake McGarvey 0–2; Shaun Curran 0–1; Jason McGee 0–1; Ciaran Coll 0–1,1f; Darren Ferry 0–2,2f; Conor Coyle 0–1; Shaun McClafferty 0–1,1’45; Sean Maguire 0–1	O'Donnell Park; Referee: James Connors (St Eunan's)

23 September 2023; 19:30; Preliminary quarter-final	Seán Mac Cumhaills	0–15 — 3–4	Four Masters	Davy Brennan Memorial Park; Referee: Martin Coll (?)
23 September 2023; 19:30; Preliminary quarter-final	Oisín Gallen 0–7,2f; Steven O'Reilly 0–2; Joel Bradley Walsh 0–2; Aaron Gillooley 0–1; Sean Martin 0–1; Sean Breen 0–1; Chad McSorley 0–1	Report	Killian Faulkner 1–1,1f; David Monaghan 1–0; Joe Leape 1–0; Seanan Carr 0–2,2f; Richard O'Rourke 0–1,1f	Davy Brennan Memorial Park; Referee: Martin Coll (?)

24 September 2023; 16:00; Preliminary quarter-final	Gaoth Dobhair	0–10 — 1–6	An Clochán Liath	The Banks; Referee: Enda McFeely (St Mary's Convoy)
24 September 2023; 16:00; Preliminary quarter-final	Ethan Harkin 0–4,3f; Daire Ó Baoill 0–2,1f; Niall Friel, Stephen McFadden, Cian McEntee, Eamon McGee 0–1 each	Report	Ryan Greene 1–3,3f; Danny Rodgers (f), Ryan Connors (f), Darren Curran 0–1 each	The Banks; Referee: Enda McFeely (St Mary's Convoy)

== Quarter-finals ==
Controversially, there was no seeding used for the draw to determine the quarter-final pairings. This resulted in the clubs that had finished in the top four being drawn to play each other. Another issue was that two of the quarter-finals were played simultaneously, while the choice of neutral venues for this stage of the championship was also problematic, with certain clubs alleging that they had to travel further than their opponent to arrive at the venue.

St Eunan's defeated Aodh Ruadh by 1–13 to 2–5 in Convoy, while Gaoth Dobhair defeated Ard an Rátha by 5–14 to 3–11 in Falcarragh. Seán Mac Cumhaills had a surprise 1–17 to 1–14 victory against Glenswilly at O'Donnell Park (a game in which Oisín Gallen scored 1–9 of his club's total), while Naomh Conaill defeated Cill Chartha by 4–7 to 0–9 at Eamonn Byrne Memorial Park.

30 September 2023; 16:00; Quarter-final	Seán Mac Cumhaills	1–17 — 1–14	Glenswilly	O'Donnell Park; Referee: Jimmy White (Killybegs)
30 September 2023; 16:00; Quarter-final	Oisín Gallen 1–9, 5f, 1m; Jamie Keegan 0–4, 1m; Joel Bradley Walsh 0–2; Cian Mulligan, Chad McSorley 0–1 each	Report	Michael Murphy 1–5, 3f, 1m; Gary McFadden 0–4, 1f; Shaun Wogan, Caolan Kelly, Kealan Dunleavy, Caoimhin Marley, Daithi Gildea 0–1 each	O'Donnell Park; Referee: Jimmy White (Killybegs)

30 September 2023; 19:30; Quarter-final	St Eunan's	1–13 — 2–5	Aodh Ruadh	Convoy; Referee: Robbie O'Donnell (Naomh Muire)
30 September 2023; 19:30; Quarter-final	Niall O'Donnell, 0–4; Darragh Mulgrew 1–0; Shane O’Donnell and Peter McEniff 0–2, Conor O'Donnell Jnr 0–2, 1f; Eoin McGeehin, Peter Devine 0–1; Eoin Dowling 0–1, 1f	Report	Cian Dolan 1–1; David Dolan 1–0; Cian Rooney, Diarmaid McInerney, Mark McGlynn 0–1; Philip Patton 0–1, 1f	Convoy; Referee: Robbie O'Donnell (Naomh Muire)

1 October 2023; 15:00; Quarter-final	Gaoth Dobhair	5–14 — 3–11	Ard an Rátha	O'Donnell Park; Referee: Stephen Doherty (Red Hughs)
1 October 2023; 15:00; Quarter-final	Daire Ó Baoill, Eamon McGee, Cian McEntee, Cathal de Burca James Ó Baoill 1–0; Ethan Harkin 0–7, 5f; Gavin McBride 0–4; Stephen Doyle McFadden, Cian McEntee, James Ó Baoill 0–1	Report	Kevin Whyte 1–4; Karl Joseph Molloy 1–4, 3f; Cailum Mally 1–1; Charlie Bennett 0–1; John Ross Molloy 0–1	O'Donnell Park; Referee: Stephen Doherty (Red Hughs)

30 September 2023; 15:30; Quarter-final	Naomh Conaill	4–7 — 0–9	Cill Chartha	Eamonn Byrne Memorial Park; Referee: Marc Brown (Four Masters)
30 September 2023; 15:30; Quarter-final	Brendan McDyer 2–0; Ciarán Thompson 0–3,1f; og; John O'Malley 0–4,2f,'45'; Odhrán Doherty 1–0	Report	Ryan McHugh 0–3; Matthew McClean 0–2; Patrick McBrearty 0–2,1f; Eoin McHugh, Oran Doogan 0–1 each	Eamonn Byrne Memorial Park; Referee: Marc Brown (Four Masters)

== Semi-finals ==
The draw for the semi-finals was held in Killybegs on 1 October 2023, following the conclusion of the Naomh Conaill and Cill Chartha quarter-final at Eamonn Byrne Memorial Park.

Naomh Conaill and St Eunan's were paired together in one semi-final, in what was a repeat of the 2022 final. The clubs had previously met in the Round 2 fixture held in Glenties, with that game ending level (0-9 for each). Naomh Conaill used 19 players in their semi-final, with 11 of those due to be at least 30 years old by the end of 2023.

Gaoth Dobhair and Seán Mac Cumhaills were paired together in the other semi-final. The clubs had previously met in the Round 1 fixture held at Magheragallon, which Gaoth Dobhair won 1–16 to 0–11.

6 October 2023; 16:00; Semi-final	Gaoth Dobhair	3–9 — 0–11	Seán Mac Cumhaills	O'Donnell Park; Referee: Mark Dorrian (Gaeil Fhánada)
6 October 2023; 16:00; Semi-final	Ethan Harkin 1–5, 2f; Stephen Donna McFadden 1–1; Odhrán Mac Niallais 1–0, 1–0 pen; Daire Ó Baoill 0–2, 1f; Aodán Breathnach 0–1	Report	Oisín Gallen 0–10, 4f, 2m; Joel Bradley Walsh 0–1	O'Donnell Park; Referee: Mark Dorrian (Gaeil Fhánada)

7 October 2023; 15:30; Semi-final	Naomh Conaill	0–11 — 0–9	St Eunan's	MacCumhaill Park; Referee: Enda McFeely (St Mary's Convoy)
7 October 2023; 15:30; Semi-final	Ciarán Thompson 0–3, 2f; John O'Malley 0–3, 2f; Anthony Thompson 0–2, Jeaic Mac Ceallabhuí 0–2; Ethan O'Donnell 0–1	Report	Eoin Dowling 0–2, 1f; Conor O'Donnell Jnr 0–2, 2f; Eoin McGeehin, Caolan Ward, Conor Morrison, Ciarán Moore 0–1; Niall O'Donnell 0–1, 1f	MacCumhaill Park; Referee: Enda McFeely (St Mary's Convoy)

== Final ==
=== Road to the final ===
Naomh Conaill

Round 1: Na Cealla Beaga 1–5 Naomh Conaill 3–12

Round 2: Naomh Conaill 0–9 St Eunan's 0–9

Round 3: Milford 0–8 Naomh Conaill 1–12

Round 4 Naomh Conaill 0–15 Glenswilly 2–5

Quarter-final: Naomh Conaill 4–7 Cill Chartha 0–9

Semi-final: Naomh Conaill 0–11 St Eunan's 0–9

Gaoth Dobhair

Round 1: Gaoth Dobhair 1–16 Seán Mac Cumhaills 0–10

Round 2: Aodh Ruadh 2–8 Gaoth Dobhair 0–9

Round 3: Gaoth Dobhair 1–10 Cloich Cheann Fhaola 0–8

Round 4: An Clochán Liath 0–8 Gaoth Dobhair 0–9

Preliminary quarter-final: An Clochán Liath 1–6 Gaoth Dobhair 0–10

Quarter-final: Ard an Rátha 3–11 Gaoth Dobhair 5–14

Semi-final:

=== Pre-match ===
This was the first time the teams had met at this stage of the competition since the 2019 final, when three games were required to determine a winner. While the Naomh Conaill team was much the same, Gaoth Dobhair's team had changed much in that time. Ronan Mac Niallais was in his first year as manager of Gaoth Dobhair.

Naomh Conaill entered the game as the favourites.

Ahead of the game Marty Boyle, Stephen McGrath, Anthony Thompson, Leo McLoone and Eoin Waide were recognised for each making a 100th club championship appearance. McGrath finished the seven games with four clean sheets.

=== Match details ===
Naomh Conaill, making a seventh consecutive appearance in the final, won a seventh title. If the two replays required to decide the 2019 title are counted, then the club was playing in its ninth final in seven years.

With a half-time lead of seven points, Naomh Conaill had ten different players scoring in the game. It was the club's fourth title in five years, meaning that their only championship defeat since the 2018 final was against St Eunan's in the 2021 final.

22 October 2023; Final	Naomh Conaill	1–16 — 1–8	Gaoth Dobhair	MacCumhaill Park; Referee: Enda McFeely (St Mary's, Convoy); Man of the Match: Ethan O'Donnell
22 October 2023; Final	Charles McGuinness 1–2; Ciarán Thompson, John O'Malley (2f) 0–3; Jeaic Mac Ceallabhuí 0–2; Odhrán Doherty, Brendan McDyer, Anthony Thompson, Ultan Doherty, Eunan Doherty, Keelan McGill 0–1 each	Report	Fergal Delaney 1-0; Michael Carroll (2f) 0–3; Michéal Roarty, Daire Ó Baoill, Ethan Harkin (f), Kieran Gillespie, Neasan Mac Giolla Bhríde 0–1 each	MacCumhaill Park; Referee: Enda McFeely (St Mary's, Convoy); Man of the Match: Ethan O'Donnell

== Ulster Senior Club Football Championship ==
Naomh Conaill advanced to the 2023 Ulster Senior Club Football Championship.

The club was drawn to play Gowna in the quarter-final. Naomh Conaill entered the match as favourite and duly delivered victory at Breffni Park, with Gowna conceding a late free which resulted in a goal scored with nearly the last kick of the match.

== Relegation ==
Milford lost the relegation battle after St Naul's won the final.

=== Relegation playoff semi-finals ===
16 September 2023; 17:30; Relegation playoff semi-final	Na Cealla Beaga	0–13 — 1–5	St Naul's	Davy Brennan Memorial Park; Referee: Marc Brown (Four Masters)
16 September 2023; 17:30; Relegation playoff semi-final	Hugh McFadden 0–3,2f; Ryan Cunningham 0–3; Jack McSharry 0–2; Jon Bán Gallagher, Rory Colyer, Evan Broderick, Ryan Carr, Paul Cunningham 0–1 each	Report	Stephen Griffin 0–4,4f; Joe Campbell 1–0; Gavin Mulreany 0–1,f	Davy Brennan Memorial Park; Referee: Marc Brown (Four Masters)

24 September 2023; 14.30; Relegation playoff semi-final	St Michael's	0–9 — 1–5	Milford	MacCumhail Park; Referee: Ryan Walsh (Réalt na Mara)
24 September 2023; 14.30; Relegation playoff semi-final	Michael Langan 0–4,2f; Carlos O'Reilly 0–2,1f; Aodh O'Donnell 0–1; Colin McFadden 0–1; Kyle McGarvey 0–1	Report	Darragh Black 1–0; Shane Black 0–2,1f; Cathal McGettigan 0–2,1f; Caolan Bolton 0–1	MacCumhail Park; Referee: Ryan Walsh (Réalt na Mara)

=== Relegation playoff final ===
7 October 2023 ??? Relegation playoff final	St Naul's	0–17 — 0–9	Milford	Convoy; Referee: James Connors (St Eunan's)
7 October 2023 ??? Relegation playoff final	Stephen Griffin 0–11,6f; Gavin Mulreany 0–2,45; Martin Breslin, John Rose, Peadar Mogan, Declan Duignan 0–1 each	Report	Kane Barrett 0–4,2f; Cathal McGettigan 0–2f; Darragh Black 0–2; Martin Doyle 0–1	Convoy; Referee: James Connors (St Eunan's)

== Gradam Shéamuis Mhic Géidigh ==
On 13 December 2023, Oisín Gallen was named as the recipient of the annual Gradam Shéamuis Mhic Géidigh. RTÉ Raidió na Gaeltachta announced the decision. The award was given to Gallen on the same evening.
