= Anthony Thompson (Gaelic footballer) =

Donegal Gaelic footballer

Personal information
- Native name: Antoin Mac Thomáis (Irish)
- Born: 24 July 1986 (age 40) County Donegal
- Occupation: Student
- Height: 6 ft 0 in (183 cm)

Sport
- Sport: Gaelic football
- Position: Left half back
Club
- Years: Club
- ?–: Naomh Conaill
Club titles
- Donegal titles: 8
Inter-county
- Years: County
- 2006–2018: Donegal
Inter-county titles
- Ulster titles: 4
- All-Irelands: 1
- NFL: 1

Anthony Thompson is an Irish Gaelic footballer who plays for Naomh Conaill and, formerly, the Donegal county team. He is a wing back.

First called up to play for the Donegal senior team ahead of the 2006 season by manager Brian McIver, Thompson won one All-Ireland Senior Football Championship (SFC) title, four Ulster Senior Football Championship titles and a National Football League title while playing for his county (won under the management of McIver, Jim McGuinness and Declan Bonner respectively). As of 2023, he had amassed seven Donegal Senior Football Championship titles while playing with his club.

== Playing career ==
=== Club ===
Playing alongside John Gildea in midfield, Thompson scored 0–3 (two of which were frees), in the final replay, as Naomh Conaill won its first ever Donegal Senior Football Championship (SFC) in 2005. He was sent off in the 2009 Donegal Senior Football Championship final, which his club lost to St Eunan's. His club won the 2010 Donegal SFC final, and went on to reach the final of the 2010 Ulster Senior Club Football Championship, knocking out Cavan champions Kingscourt, Monaghan champions Clontibret and Tyrone champions Coalisland along the way.

Thompson played for his club in the final of the 2015 Donegal SFC. His club won. Then he played for his club in the final of the 2019 Donegal SFC. His club won, following a second replay. Then Thompson played for his club in the 2020 Donegal SFC final. His club won, following extra-time and a penalty shoot-out.

Then he played for his club in the 2022 Donegal SFC final. His club won. Then he played for his club in the 2023 Donegal SFC final. His club won, and Thompson even scored a point. Ahead of the 2023 final, Thompson (alongside Marty Boyle, Stephen McGrath, Leo McLoone and Eoin Waide) was recognised for making a 100th club championship appearance.

Thompson played for his club in the 2025 Donegal SFC, when his club won the final again, receiving his eighth winners' medal from 13 appearances in the decider.

=== Inter-county ===
After his club's 2005 Donegal SFC title win, Thompson was called into the Donegal senior team by manager Brian McIver.

Thompson was a member of the Donegal squad that won the 2007 National Football League.

Under the management of Jim McGuinness, and in McGuinness's first season in charge, Thompson won the 2011 Ulster Senior Football Championship, playing and scoring two points in the final against Derry. He played again when Donegal returned to the final in 2012. Donegal defeated Down in that game. Normally a quiet member of the team, in the All-Ireland Senior Football Championship quarter-final defeat of Kerry at Croke Park on 5 August 2012, he knocked teammate Patrick McBrearty out of the game with his head. He played in the 2012 All-Ireland Senior Football Championship final against Mayo. Donegal won. Though nominated for an All Star he was not successful, but was selected as a replacement All Star for the Football Tour of New York when others such as Colm McFadden and Frank McGlynn were unable to attend.

Thompson won his third Ulster Senior Football Championship in 2014, scoring one point against Monaghan in the final. He played 52 of the 54 league and championship matches under McGuinness's management between 2011 and 2014, missing only two league games against Cork and Kerry due to injury; only goalkeeper Paul Durcan played in more games under McGuinness.

Under the management of Rory Gallagher, who succeeded McGuinness ahead of the 2015 season, Thompson continued to play for his county. For much of Donegal's 2015 campaign, he commuted from his work base in Essex, England. He moved back to Ireland in 2016. His last appearance for Donegal during Gallagher's ill-fated managerial reign was against Dublin in the 2016 All-Ireland Senior Football Championship quarter-final defeat at Croke Park, a game in which he scored one point.

Thompson returned to the fore under the management of Declan Bonner. He collected his fourth and final Ulster SFC in 2018, appearing as a second half substitute for Odhrán Mac Niallais in the final against Fermanagh. However, he did not return after the winter.

== Style of play ==
Thompson has been considered by national media to be "an invaluable leader", a "selfless player" and "one of the most iconic number 5s in the county's history".

His virtuoso performance in the 2012 All-Ireland Senior Football Championship final was highlighted by The Irish Times which noted how he "seemed to shepherd the play exactly to his liking and moved through the fare in that unhurried, three-quarters pace style of his", at one stage "loitering in front of David Clarke's goal, a de facto full forward doing what good front men do: keeping quiet as a church mouse and waiting to be spotted". Despite playing at wing back, he was the first person to congratulate Michael Murphy following his early goal in that game, having raced through to offer support to his full-forward team captain.

== Honours ==
Donegal

- All-Ireland Senior Football Championship: 2012
- Ulster Senior Football Championship: 2011, 2012, 2014, 2018
- National Football League Division 1: 2007
- National Football League Division 2: 2011

Naomh Conaill

- Donegal Senior Football Championship: 2005, 2010, 2015, 2019, 2020, 2022, 2023, 2025

Individual

- All Star nomination: 2012
- Gaelic Life Ulster Club All Star: 2019
