= 2012 Donegal Senior Football Championship =

- 2012 Craobh Sinsear Peile; Dhún na nGall

Tournament details
- County: Donegal
- Year: 2012

Winners
- Champions: St Eunan's (13th win)
- Manager: Eamon O'Boyle, Brendan Devenney, Michael McGeehin
- Captain: Micheál Martin

Promotion/Relegation
- Promoted team(s): Termon
- Relegated team(s): St Naul's

The 2012 Donegal Senior Football Championship was the 90th official edition of the Donegal GAA's premier club Gaelic football tournament for senior graded teams in County Donegal.

== Format ==
There was a preliminary round. The first round involved eight two-legged ties played home and away. The eight winning clubs progressed to the quarter-finals, from which the four winning clubs progressed to the semi-finals, from which the two winning clubs progressed to the final.

The 2012 championship finished later than usual, postponed due to the senior Donegal county team's involvement in the 2012 All-Ireland Senior Football Championship final, which Donegal won on 23 September 2012. The 2012 Donegal SFC got back underway a week later. With interest in Gaelic football at an all-time high after the 2012 All-Ireland SFC final, the Donegal SFC final was broadcast live nationwide on TG4.

== Draw ==
The draw for the first round (as well as a preliminary round) was made at the RTÉ Raidió na Gaeltachta studios in Derrybeg.

== Bracket ==
Preliminary Round
Cill Chartha	2-11; 0-15
Malin	0-6; 0-10

First Round
Gaoth Dobhair	0-7; 0-7
Gleann Suilli	0-9; 2-9
An Clochán Liath	0-10; 1-9
Cloich Cheann Fhaola	0-7; 0-9
Cill Chartha	1-8; 10-1; 2-5
St Eunan's	1-5; 1-12; 2-8
Na Cealla Beaga	0-10; 0-10; 1-13
Gaeil Fhanada	1-7; 1-7; 0-11
Glenfin	0-8; 2-9; 0-8
Réalt na Mara	2-10; 1-11; 1-11
Naomh Conaill	1-9; 0-12
St Naul's	0-3; 0-6
Ard an Rátha	0-7; 0-11; 0-5
Four Masters	0-9; 1-7; 0-12
St Michael's	3-19; 1-15
Seán Mac Cumhaill s	1-6; 1-8

Quarter-finals
Glenswilly	0-8
An Clochán Liath	2-7
St Eunan's	2-15
Na Cealla Beaga	0-7
Réalt na Mara?	?
Naomh Conaill	?
Four Masters	0-9; 1-15
St Michael's	0-9; 1-8

Semi-finals
An Clochán Liath	0-6
St Eunan's	3-6
Naomh Conaill	0-9
Four Masters	0-6

Final
St Eunan's	1-7
Naomh Conaill	0-9

== Results ==
=== Preliminary round ===
5 May 2012; 18:30	Cill Chartha	2-11 - 0-6	Malin	Pairc Tamnaigh, Kilcar; Referee: Line: J. White/A. Mullen

2 June 2012; 19:00	Malin	0-10 - 0-15	Cill Chartha	Malin; Referee: Line: J. O'Donnell/P. McKeever

=== First round ===
==== First leg ====
29 September 2012; 17:00	An Clochán Liath	0-10 - 0-7	Cloich Cheann Fhaola	Dungloe; Referee: Line: M. McGlinchey/A. Boyd

29 September 2012; 17:00	Gaeil Fhanada	1-7 - 0-10	Na Cealla Beaga	Pairc Ui Shiail, Portsalon; Referee: Line: J. McGinley/B. Trearty

30 September 2012; 15:00	Ard an Rátha	0-7 - 0-9	Four Masters	Pairc na Phiarsaigh, Ardara; Referee: Line: P. McGowan/J. Brennan

30 September 2012; 15:00	Réalt na Mara	2-10 - 0-8	Glenfin	Gaelic Park, Bundoran; Referee: Line: G. O'Donnell/J. McGlanaghey

30 September 2012; 15:00	Gaoth Dobhair	0-7 - 0-9	Gleann Suilli	Machaire Gathlan; Referee: Line: L. McConigley/M. Dorrian

30 September 2012; 15:00	St Eunan's	1-5 - 1-8	Cill Chartha	O'Donnell Park, Letterkenny; Referee: Line: P. Clifford/P. McGonilge

30 September 2012; 15:00	Naomh Conaill	1-9 - 0-3	St Naul's	Davy Brennan Memorial Park, Glenties; Referee: Line: A. Mullin/R. McGonigle

30 September 2012; 15:00	St Michael's	3-19 - 1-6	Seán Mac Cumhaills	Pairc Naomh Mícheál; Referee: Line: P. McKeever/J. O'Donnell

==== Second leg ====
6 October 2012; 17:00	Cloich Cheann Fhaola	0-9 - 1-9	An Clochán Liath	Pairc Naomh Fionnan, Falcarragh; Referee: Line: L. McConaigley/M. Dorrian

6 October 2012; 17:00	Na Cealla Beaga	0-10 - 1-7	Gaeil Fhanada	Fintra; Referee: Line: M. McShane/C. Doherty

6 October 2012; 17:00	St Naul's	0-6 - 0-12	Naomh Conaill	St Naul's; Referee: Line: J. McGlanaghey/A. Mullin

6 October 2012; 17:00	Seán Mac Cumhaills	1-8 - 1-15	St Michael's	MacCumhaill Park, Ballybofey; Referee: Line: J. McGinley/B. Trearty

7 October 2012; 15:00	Cill Chartha	10-1 - 1-12	St Eunan's	Pairc Tamnaigh, Kilcar; Referee: Line: A Mullin/T Gallagher

7 October 2012; 15:00	Glenfin	2-9 - 1-11	Réalt na Mara	Pairc Ghleann Fhinne; Referee: Line: C. Doherty/C. Foy

7 October 2012; 15:00	Glenswilly	2-9 - 0-7	Gaoth Dobhair	Glenswilly; Referee: Line: D. Langan/E. McFeeley

7 October 2012; 15:00	Four Masters	1-7 - 0-11	Ard an Rátha	Four Masters; Referee: Line: E. McHale/R. McCallig

==== Play off/ extra time ====
10 October 2012; 20:00	Gaeil Fhanada	0-11 - 1-13	Na Cealla Beaga	MacCumhaill Park, Ballybofey

10 October 2012; 20:00	Glenfin	0-8 - 1-11	Réalt na Mara	Ard an Rátha

11 October 2012; 20:00	Ard an Rátha	0-5 - 0-12	Four Masters	MacCumhaill Park, Ballybofey

11 October 2012; 20:00	Cill Chartha	2-5 - 2-8	St Eunan's	Naomh Muire - Convoy

=== Quarter-finals ===
13 October 2012; 16:30	Glenswilly	0-8 - 2-7	An Clochán Liath	O'Donnell Park, Letterkenny

14 October 2012; 15:45	Glenfin	1-10 - 0-5	Réalt na Mara	MacCumhaill Park, Ballybofey

14 October 2012; 15:45	Four Masters	0-9 - 0-9	St Michael's	O'Donnell Park, Letterkenny

14 October 2012; 17:15	St Eunan's	2-15 - 0-7	Na Cealla Beaga	MacCumhaill Park, Ballybofey

==== Quarter-final replay ====
18 October 2012; 20:00	Four Masters	1-15 - 1-8	St Michael's	MacCumhaill Park, Ballybofey

=== Semi-finals ===
20 October 2012; 20:00	An Clochán Liath	0-6 - 3-6	St Eunan's	MacCumhaill Park, Ballybofey
20 October 2012; 20:00		Report		MacCumhaill Park, Ballybofey

21 October 2012; 16:00	Naomh Conaill	0-9 - 0-6	Four Masters	O'Donnell Park, Letterkenny; Referee: M. McShane (Kilcar)
21 October 2012; 16:00	D. Molloy (0-5, 1f), D. Gallagher (0-2, 1f), J. O'Malley (0-1), C. Thompson (0-1)	Report	M. Doherty (0-4, 2f, one 45), S. Keeney (0-1), C. McMonagle (0-1)	O'Donnell Park, Letterkenny; Referee: M. McShane (Kilcar)

=== Final ===
St Eunan's defeated Naomh Conaill in the final, held at MacCumhaill Park in Ballybofey on 4 November 2012. The decisive goal in the final was scored by young Lee McMonagle in the 50th minute of the game, following a layoff from full-forward Ross Wherity, who received the ball via a long pass from Rory Kavanagh. The teams were level on many occasions until Mark McGowan scored the winning point in freak circumstances. Brendan McDyer of opponents Naomh Conaill attempted to backpass to his goalkeeper Stephen McGrath, only for the ball to drift out for a '45'. McGowan stepped up to punish. As the game ended he was photographed celebrating—stooped, wild-eyed with open mouth, sweat-soaked, bare thighs tensed, veins throbbing, mud-stained legs apart and clenched fists turned upwards.

McDyer was still affected by his error years later.

4 November 2012; 16:00	Naomh Conaill	0-9 - 1-7	St Eunan's	MacCumhaill Park, Ballybofey; Referee: R. O'Donnell
4 November 2012; 16:00	L. McMonagle 1-1, M. McGowan 0-2 (1 '45'), R. Kavanagh 0-1, C. Gibbons 0-1 (f), S. McVeigh 0-1, C. Dunne 0-1		D. Gallagher 0-5 (3f), D. Molloy 0-2 (1f), L. Thompson 0-1, L. McLoone 0-1	MacCumhaill Park, Ballybofey; Referee: R. O'Donnell

== Ulster Senior Club Football Championship ==
As Donegal SFC winner, Eunan's progressed to the Ulster Club SFC quarter-final at Armagh's Athletic Grounds the following week, where Crossmaglen Rangers won.
