= Leon Thompson =

Donegal Gaelic footballer

Personal information
- Native name: Leon Mac Thomáis (Irish)

Sport
- Sport: Gaelic football
Club
- Years: Club
- 200?–201?: Naomh Conaill
Club titles
- Donegal titles: 3
Inter-county
- Years: County
- 2006–20??: Donegal
Inter-county titles
- Ulster titles: 1
- NFL: 1

Leon Thompson (born 1986) is an Irish former Gaelic footballer who played for Naomh Conaill and the Donegal county team. He was part of the Donegal team that reached the 2014 All-Ireland Senior Football Championship final. Thompson won the 2007 National Football League and, later, an Ulster Senior Football Championship medal with Donegal.

== Biography ==
Thompson played in the final of the 2005 Donegal Senior Football Championship (SFC), as Naomh Conaill won its first ever title (after a replay). His club also won the 2010 Donegal SFC final, and went on to reach the final of the 2010 Ulster Senior Club Football Championship, knocking out Cavan champions Kingscourt, Monaghan champions Clontibret and Tyrone champions Coalisland along the way. He then played for his club in the final of the 2015 Donegal Senior Football Championship. His club won.

After the 2005 Donegal SFC title win, Thompson was called into the Donegal senior team by manager Brian McIver.

Thompson is a veteran of Donegal's 2007 National Football League-winning campaign. When recalled to the senior inter-county panel by Jim McGuinness for winter training in September 2013, he had not played for Donegal since 2009. He maintained his place with the team for their 2014 Ulster Senior Football Championship and the year's All-Ireland SFC final.

== Honours ==
Donegal

- Ulster Senior Football Championship: 2014
- National Football League: 2007

Naomh Conaill

- Donegal Senior Football Championship: 2005, 2010, 2015
