= Ciarán Thompson =

Donegal Gaelic footballer (born 1994/95)

Personal information
- Native name: Ciarán Mac Thomáis (Irish)
- Born: 1994/5
- Occupation: Student
- Height: 6 ft 1 in (185 cm)

Sport
- Sport: Gaelic football
Club
- Years: Club
- 201?–: Naomh Conaill
Club titles
- Donegal titles: 5
Inter-county
Years	County	Apps (scores)
2016–	Donegal	100+
- Ulster titles: 4

Ciarán Thompson (born 1994/5) is an Irish Gaelic footballer who plays for Naomh Conaill and the Donegal county team.

He is a ciotóg.

== Playing career ==
=== Club ===
Thompson played in the 2015 Donegal Senior Football Championship final, which his club won, and scored a point.

The 2019 Donegal Senior Football Championship final was a three-game affair; Thompson scored a '45 in the first game, 0–3 in the second game (one of which was from a free) and 0–3 in the third game (one of which was a '45). He captained his club to the title. Then he led his club to the 2019 Ulster Senior Club Football Championship final, a first for the club since 2010 when Thompson was aged 15. He also captained his club to the 2020 Donegal Senior Football Championship, scoring a penalty in the first half of the final and another in the shootout that decided the game, delayed until August 2021 due to the impact of the COVID-19 pandemic on Gaelic games.

Then he won the 2022 Donegal Senior Football Championship, scoring four points in the final, three of which were frees. He also won the 2023 Donegal Senior Football Championship, scoring 0–3 in the final against Gaoth Dobhair.

Though his club won the 2025 Donegal SFC, Thompson was missing after tearing his ACL while playing for Donegal in the 2025 All-Ireland SFC final at Croke Park.

=== Inter-county ===
First featuring for his county at senior level under the management of Rory Gallagher, Thompson was first called up ahead of the 2016 season as one of twelve new recruits, alongside such players as Eoghan Bán Gallagher, Caolan McGonagle and Stephen McMenamin. Thompson played twice during Donegal's Division One campaign in the 2016 National Football League: first he started the league opener against Down and scored an early point and assisted two second-half goals on his league debut, then he started and scored a point in the next fixture against Cork.

He made a substitute appearance in the 2016 All-Ireland Senior Football Championship quarter-final against Dublin at Croke Park.

Thompson started for Donegal against Kerry in the opening round of the 2017 National Football League, scoring three points. He scored another three points in the next game, against Roscommon. He scored two points in the next game against Dublin, both from frees. In the next game against Cavan, he scored five points, the first from a distance of 45 metres and one of which was a free, during a man-of-the-match performance. He scored three points against Tyrone in the next game. He followed this up with a point in the next game against Monaghan and two more points in the last game against Mayo.

Thompson started the 2017 Ulster Senior Football Championship quarter-final against Antrim and scored 0–4 (three of which were frees). He then started the semi-final loss to Tyrone. He also started the 2017 All-Ireland Senior Football Championship qualifier defeat of Meath at Páirc Tailteann.

Under the management of Declan Bonner, Thompson made a substitute appearance in the opening fixture of the 2018 National Football League against Kerry in Killarney. He also made a substitute appearance in the next game against Galway. He started the next game away to Dublin and scored a point. He made a substitute appearance in the fourth game against Kildare. He started the fifth game against Tyrone. He made a substitute appearance in the sixth game against Monaghan and scored a point. He started the seventh game against Mayo and scored a point.

Thompson started the 2018 Ulster Senior Football Championship final, scoring 0–3 (including one free) as Donegal defeated Fermanagh. He had previously started the preliminary round against Cavan (scoring 0–3), the quarter-final against Derry and the semi-final against Down (scoring 0–1).

Thompson started and scored two points against Clare in the opening fixture of the 2019 National Football League in Ennis. He scored five points (including two frees) against Meath in the second fixture. He scored four points (including two frees, one sideline) in the third fixture against Tipperary. He scored a point from a free in the fourth fixture against Fermanagh and did likewise in the fifth fixture against Armagh and the sixth fixture against Cork.

Thompson started the 2019 Ulster Senior Football Championship final, and scored two points as Donegal defeated Cavan. He had previously started against Fermanagh in the quarter-final (scoring a point) and made a substitute appearance against Tyrone in the semi-final.

As of 2019, Thompson had 49 appearances for the Donegal senior team since his debut in 2016.

Thompson started Donegal's first five fixtures of the 2020 National Football League against Mayo (scoring four points, three of which were frees), Meath (scoring one point from a free), Galway (scoring a goal and a point from a free), Dublin (scoring two points, one of which was a free) and Monaghan (scoring one point). Then the COVID-19 pandemic brought play to a halt. Play resumed behind closed doors on 18 October with a home game against Tyrone; Thompson started that game and scored two points from frees. He scored five points (two of which were frees) in the concluding game of the league campaign (away to Kerry). Thompson then started the 2020 Ulster Senior Football Championship victory against Tyrone, scoring seven points (five of which were frees). He was named RTÉ man of the match, though the BBC chose Michael Langan. Thompson also started the semi-final victory against Armagh, scoring two points (one of which was a free). Thompson sustained an injury during training ahead of the 2020 Ulster Senior Football Championship final and could only make a substitute appearance in the game. He did not score in what proved to be the season's concluding game for his team.

Thompson started each of Donegal's four fixtures of the 2021 National Football League, against Tyrone, Monaghan, Armagh and Dublin, scoring two points each against Tyrone and Monaghan, one point against Armagh and no points against Dublin. In the 2021 Ulster Senior Football Championship, he started each of Donegal's three fixtures, scoring a point each against Down in the opening round and against Tyrone in the semi-final but was held scoreless against Derry in the quarter-final.

Thompson started Donegal's opening fixture of the 2022 National Football League, against Mayo but was substituted for Jason McGee after ten minutes. He missed the next game against Kildare. He started the third game, away to Kerry, and the fourth game, at home to Tyrone, but was held scoreless. In the next game, against Monaghan, he started but was substituted for Michael Murphy after 28 minutes. He did not play in the last two fixtures, away to Dublin and against Armagh at O'Donnell Park.

In the 2022 Ulster Senior Football Championship, Thompson started both of Donegal's first two fixtures, the quarter-final against Armagh and the semi-final against Cavan, scoring a point against each opponent. He made a substitute appearance in the final against Derry during extra-time. He also started the 2022 All-Ireland Senior Football Championship qualifier loss to Armagh, scoring a point.

Wore the captain's armband in the 2024 National Football League Division 2 final (his 100th appearance for Donegal), scored three first half points from play, raised the trophy with Patrick McBrearty afterwards. McBrearty looks like he is in the tracksuit of Jim McGuinness. Or Jason McGee. Younger brother of Leon and Anthony.

Thompson tore his ACL while playing for Donegal in the 2025 All-Ireland SFC final at Croke Park. In November 2025, he drew the names for the 2026 Ulster Senior Football Championship. Speaking at the launch of the 2026 Dr McKenna Cup in December 2025, Thompson confirmed that he had had surgery on his injured leg.

== Honours ==
Donegal

- Ulster Senior Football Championship: 2018, 2019, 2024, 2025
- National Football League Division 2: 2024

Naomh Conaill

- Donegal Senior Football Championship: 2015, 2019 (c), 2020 (c), 2022, 2023

Individual

- All Star: 0
  - Nominated in 2020, 2025
- Gradam Shéamuis Mhic Géidigh: 2019
- Gaelic Life Ulster Club All Star: 2019
