= Thomas Donoghue =

Donegal Gaelic footballer

Sport
- Sport: Gaelic football
Club
- Years: Club
- ?–?: Naomh Conaill
Club titles
- Donegal titles: 2
Inter-county
- Years: County
- ?–?: Donegal
Inter-county titles
- NFL: 1

Thomas Donoghue is a Gaelic footballer who played for Naomh Conaill and the Donegal county team.

Donoghue was a member of the Naomh Conaill side that won its first ever Donegal Senior Football Championship (after a replay) in 2005. He added another in 2010.

After the 2005 Donegal SFC title win, Donoghue was called into the Donegal senior team by manager Brian McIver.

With Donegal he won the 2007 National Football League. He came on as a substitute in the final against Mayo. He had been named to start the final but Paddy McConigley was a late replacement for him.
