= Paddy Campbell =

Irish Gaelic football manager

Personal information
- Native name: Padraig Ó Caimbéal (Irish)
- Nickname: The Undertaker
- Born: 22 April 1974 (age 52) Glenties, County Donegal

Sport
- Sport: Gaelic football
- Position: Full-back
Clubs
- Years: Club
- ?–?: Naomh Conaill; Steelstown
Club titles
- Donegal titles: 1
College
- Years: College
- ?–?: Queen's University Belfast
College titles
- Sigerson titles: 1
Inter-county
- Years: County
- 2000–2008: Donegal
Inter-county titles
- NFL: 1

Paddy Campbell is a Gaelic football manager who played for Naomh Conaill, Steelstown and the Donegal county team. Ahead of the 2022 season, he joined his county's management team under Declan Bonner.

== Biography ==
Campbell is from Glenties.

Campbell won a Sigerson Cup medal with Queen's University Belfast in 2000. He captained the Naomh Conaill side that won its first ever Donegal Senior Football Championship (after a replay) in 2005.

He did not represent Donegal at minor or under-21 level.

Under the management of Declan Bonner (first spell), Campbell made his senior debut for his county in 2000.

After the 2005 Donegal SFC title win, Campbell was called into the Donegal senior team by manager Brian McIver.

With Donegal he won the 2007 National Football League. He started the final against Mayo. He also played in the 2006 Ulster Senior Football Championship Final at Croke Park. He announced in 2008 that he had played his last inter-county game. His final inter-county game was against Monaghan in the third-round of the 2007 All-Ireland qualifiers.

Elsewhere Paddy and brother, Seamus, have been involved with teams in Derry and Tyrone, befriending Brian 'Bud' Ludlow as manager of Castledawson in 2012. In February 2013, he was named manager of the Naomh Conaill senior team. He was involved alongside Paul McIver at Tyrone GAA club Dromore and, as well as managing Castledawson, has managed the Steelstown and Slaughtmanus clubs.

He was appointed as Derry under-17 football team manager in November 2017. He went on to become Derry minor manager as well. He did so when Damian McErlain took over as manager of the senior team, lasting two years before resigning due to work commitments. In December 2020, he took over manager of Tyrone GAA club Owen Roe Leckpatrick.

He lives in Derry with his family and has also played for Steelstown.

Campbell joined the Donegal senior football management team under Declan Bonner ahead of the 2022 season.
