= Michael Carr (Gaelic footballer) =

Irish Gaelic footballer

Sport
- Sport: Gaelic football
Club
- Years: Club
- 19??–19??: Cill Chartha
Inter-county
- Years: County
- 19??–19??: Donegal

Michael Carr is an Irish former Gaelic footballer who played for Cill Chartha and the Donegal county team.

Carr was man of the match in the 1980 Donegal Senior Football Championship final.

He was again man of the match in the 1983 Ulster Senior Football Championship final victory over Cavan, denying his clubmate Martin McHugh, who had scored 0–7 of Donegal's 1–14.
