= Conor Classon =

Irish Gaelic footballer

Personal information
- Native name: Conor Ó Classaig (Irish)
- Born: Rosbeg, County Donegal

Sport
- Sport: Gaelic football
Club
- Years: Club
- ?–: Ard an Rátha
Inter-county
- Years: County
- 201?–201?: Donegal

Conor Classon is an Irish Gaelic footballer who plays for Ard an Rátha, representing them at all levels. Previously, he played for the Donegal county team.

He is from Rosbeg in County Donegal.

== Playing career ==
Classon did not play at minor level, but his rookie year came in 2010.

Along with clubmates Paddy McGrath and Peter McNelis, he was part of the Donegal under-21 squad which qualified for the 2010 All-Ireland Under-21 Football Championship final. He had earlier played for the county team throughout the 2010 Ulster Under-21 Football Championship campaign, a competition which Donegal won.

Classon made a substitute appearance in the 2011 National Football League opener against Sligo, replacing Ryan Bradley.

Classon made a substitute appearance in the 2014 National Football League Division 2 Final against Monaghan at Croke Park, replacing Odhrán Mac Niallais. Known for his Scandinavian physique, he is valued for his strength, pace and his good hands.

== Honours ==
- All-Ireland Under-21 Football Championship runner-up: 2010
- Ulster Under-21 Football Championship: 2010
