= 2020 Donegal Senior Football Championship =

Donegal S.F.C.
- Season: 2020
- Champions: Naomh Conaill (5th title)
- Relegated: ???
- Winning captain: Ciarán Thompson
- Man of the Match: Ciarán Thompson
- Winning manager: Martin Regan
- Matches: 42

The 2020 Donegal Senior Football Championship was the 98th official edition of Donegal GAA's premier Gaelic football tournament for senior graded clubs in County Donegal. 16 teams competed, with the winner representing Donegal in the Ulster Senior Club Football Championship. Generally, the championship begins with four groups of four and continues with a knock-out format. However, this year, due to the COVID-19 pandemic, the format was changed.

Naomh Conaill was defending champion after defeating Gaoth Dobhair by a scoreline of 0–8 to 0–7, after a second replay in the 2019 final.

The 2020 competition progressed as far as the final but this match was twice postponed due to issues arising from the impact of the COVID-19 pandemic on Gaelic games. It was eventually played on Saturday, 14 August 2021, with Naomh Conaill winning a fifth title.

This was St Naul's return to the senior grade (for the first time since 2012), after a seven-year exodus concluded with the club winning the 2019 Donegal Intermediate Football Championship. The club defeated Cloich Cheann Fhaola by 1–10 to 0–10 in the IFC final.

== Team changes ==
The following teams changed division since the 2019 championship season.

=== To S.F.C. ===
Promoted from 2019 Donegal I.F.C.

- St Naul's - (I.F.C. Champions)

=== From S.F.C. ===
Relegated to 2020 Donegal I.F.C.

- Malin

== Format alterations ==
Due to the COVID-19 pandemic, the 2020 championship took a different format to previous editions of the competition. All 16 teams competed in a league competition, playing four games each. A random draw determined which teams faced each other in each of the four rounds. No team could meet each other twice in the group stage. Each team played two home games and two away games in this league phase. The top eight teams went into a seeded draw for the quarter-finals (the top four had home advantage in those quarter-finals), while the bottom four teams entered a relegation play-off.

== League stage ==
All 16 teams entered the competition at this stage. A random draw determined which teams faced each other in each of the four rounds. No team could meet each other twice in the group stage. The top eight teams went into a seeded draw for the quarter-finals, while the bottom three teams entered a relegation playoff. If teams were level on points and a place in the quarter-final was at stake, a playoff would have been conducted to determine which team went through.

=== Table ===
| Pos | Team | Pld | W | L | D | PD | Pts |
|---|---|---|---|---|---|---|---|
| 1 | Naomh Conaill | 4 | 4 | 0 | 0 | +76 | 8 |
| 2 | Gaoth Dobhair | 4 | 4 | 0 | 0 | +55 | 8 |
| 3 | Cill Chartha | 4 | 2 | 0 | 1 | +64 | 7 |
| 4 | St Eunan's | 4 | 2 | 0 | 1 | +35 | 7 |
| 5 | Réalt na Mara | 4 | 3 | 1 | 0 | +21 | 6 |
| 6 | St Michael's | 4 | 3 | 1 | 0 | -1 | 6 |
| 7 | Seán MacCumhaills | 4 | 2 | 1 | 1 | -1 | 5 |
| 8 | Glenfin | 4 | 2 | 1 | 1 | -3 | 5 |
| 9 | St Naul's | 4 | 2 | 2 | 0 | -15 | 4 |
| 10 | Four Masters | 4 | 1 | 2 | 1 | -15 | 3 |
| 11 | Na Cealla Beaga | 4 | 1 | 3 | 0 | -31 | 2 |
| 12 | Glenswilly | 4 | 1 | 3 | 0 | -37 | 2 |
| 13 | Milford | 4 | 0 | 3 | 1 | -35 | 1 |
| 14 | An Clochán Liath | 4 | 0 | 4 | 0 | -16 | 0 |
| 15 | Ard an Rátha | 4 | 0 | 4 | 0 | -31 | 0 |
| 16 | Termon | 4 | 0 | 4 | 0 | -66 | 0 |

Round 1:
- Réalt na Mara 1–5, 0-15 St Eunan's, 31/7/2020
- St Michael's 3-5, 0-8 Glenswilly, 31/7/2020
- Naomh Conaill 3-20, 0-6 Milford, 1/8/2020
- Cill Chartha 4-21, 0-7 Termon, 1/8/2020
- Na Cealla Beaga 1–6, 1-12 Glenfin, 1/8/2020
- Four Masters 0–7, 2-17 Gaoth Dobhair, 2/8/2020
- St Naul's 1-14, 1-13 An Clochán Liath, 2/8/2020
- Seán MacCumhaills 1-10, 1-9 Ard an Rátha, 2/8/2020

Round 2:

- St Eunan's 1–9, 1-9 Cill Chartha, 7/8/2020
- Gaoth Dobhair 3-13, 0-6 Na Cealla Beaga, 8/8/2020
- Termon 2–12, 2-16 Réalt na Mara, 8/8/2020
- Glenfin 1-14, 0-11 St Naul's, 8/8/2020
- Milford 0–14, 1-14 St Michael's, 8/8/2020
- Ard an Rátha 0–5, 0-18 Naomh Conaill, 9/8/2020
- An Clochán Liath 0–11, 1-11 Seán MacCumhaills, 9/8/2020
- Glenswilly 2-14, 1-13 Four Masters, 9/8/2020

Round 3:

- Naomh Conaill 6-18, 0-8 Termon, 14/8/2020
- Seán MacCumhaills 1–12, 1-12 Glenfin, 15/8/2020
- Four Masters 4-10, 1-14 An Clochán Liath, 1/8/2020
- St Naul's 0–5, 4-11 Gaoth Dobhair, 1/8/2020
- Réalt na Mara 2-18, 1-12 Milford, 16/8/2020
- St Michael's 1-11, 0-12 Ard an Rátha, 16/8/2020
- Cill Chartha 4-24, 1-10 Glenswilly, 16/8/2020
- Na Cealla Beaga 0–6, 3-13 St Eunan's, 16/8/2020

Round 4:

- St Eunan's -vs- St Michael's, 23/8/2020
- An Clochán Liath -vs- Na Cealla Beaga, 23/8/2020
- Ard an Rátha -vs- Réalt na Mara, 23/8/2020
- Termon -vs- St Naul's, 23/8/2020
- Glenswilly -vs- Naomh Conaill, 23/8/2020
- Milford -vs- Four Masters, 23/8/2020
- Gaoth Dobhair -vs- Seán MacCumhaills, 23/8/2020
- Glenfin -vs- Cill Chartha, 23/8/2020

== Knock-out stage ==
Quarter-finals
Naomh Conaill | 2-16
Gleann Fhinne | 0-05
St Eunan's | 8-11
Réalt na Mara | 0-06
Cill Chartha | 3-14
St Michael's | 3-12
Gaoth Dobhair | 0-14
Seán Mac Cumhaills | 1-10

Semi-finals
Naomh Conaill | 1-10
St Eunan's | 0-12
Cill Chartha | 0-14
Gaoth Dobhair | 1-06

Final
Naomh Conaill | 2-07 (4)
Gaoth Dobhair | 0-13 (2)

=== Quarter-finals ===
| ? August 2020 Quarter-final | -vs- |

| ? August 2020 Quarter-final | -vs- |

| ? August 2020 Quarter-final | -vs- |

| ? August 2020 Quarter-final | -vs- |

=== Semi-finals ===
The semi-final draw was held on 6 September, producing the same pairings as this stage of the previous competition.

| ? September 2020 Semi-final | -vs- |

| ? September 2020 Semi-final | -vs- |

=== Final ===
The final was originally scheduled for 19 September 2020. However, it emerged on 21 September that a Cill Chartha player had tested positive for the coronavirus; initially the game was announced to be proceeding as scheduled.

A short while later though, the final was postponed until 7 October. However, the GAA suspended all club fixtures with immediate effect on 5 October, citing "post-match celebrations and a lack of social distancing at certain events" elsewhere in the country (i.e. Cork, Meath) as "disappointing and problematic".

Naomh Conaill retained the title, in the most controversial of circumstances, a 4–2 penalty shootout victory after extra-time on Saturday, 14 August 2021. Naomh Conaill's opponent lodged an appeal against the result on Tuesday, 17 August 2021.

Eventually Naomh Conaill's victory was allowed, though the club was fined.

| 19 September 2020; 7 October 2020; 14 August 2021: 8pm Final | Naomh Conaill; Naomh Conaill; Naomh Conaill | P-vs-P; P-vs-P; 2–7 – 0–13; Naomh Conaill win 4-2 on penalties | Cill Chartha; Cill Chartha; Cill Chartha | MacCumhaill Park |
| | Ciarán Thompson (pen); Kevin McGettigan | | | Referee: Mark Dorrian (Gaeil Fhánada) |

== Relegation play-offs ==
The four bottom-placed teams from the league phase entered the relegation play-offs. The 13th and 14th placed teams had home advantage in the relegation semi-finals and played the 16th and 15th placed teams respectively. The two winners maintained their senior status for 2021. The two losers contested a relegation final to determine which team would be relegated to the 2021 I.F.C.

| September 2020 Relegation semi-final | -vs- |

| September 2020 Relegation semi-final | -vs- |

| September 2020 Relegation final | -vs- |

== Ulster Senior Club Football Championship ==
No Ulster Senior Club Football Championship was held, due to the impact of the COVID-19 pandemic on Gaelic games.

== Gradam Shéamuis Mhic Géidigh ==
No Gradam Shéamuis Mhic Géidigh was given, due to the impact of the COVID-19 pandemic on Gaelic games.

== Television rights ==
The following matches were broadcast live on national television, unless otherwise indicated:

| Round | RTÉ | TG4 |
|---|---|---|
| League stage: Round 2 | — | St Eunan's v Cill Chartha |

League stage: Round 4 matches were all streamed live and free-to-air on Sunday 23 August.
