= 2022 Donegal Senior Football Championship =

Donegal S.F.C.
- Season: 2022
- Champions: Naomh Conaill (6th title)
- Relegated: Réalt na Mara
- Winning captain: Kevin McGettigan
- Man of the Match: Ciarán Thompson
- Winning manager: Martin Regan

The 2022 Donegal Senior Football Championship was the 100th official edition of Donegal GAA's premier Gaelic football tournament for senior graded clubs in County Donegal. 16 teams competed, with the winner representing Donegal in the Ulster Senior Club Football Championship.

St Eunan's was defending champion after defeating Naomh Conaill in the 2021 final.

Naomh Conaill advanced again, to the 2022 final, where the club won this time, but in controversial circumstances, and by one point, after St Eunan's player Shane O'Donnell was sent off for patting Jeaic Mac Ceallabhuí.

== Team changes ==
The following teams changed division since the 2021 championship season.

=== To S.F.C. ===
Promoted from 2021 Donegal I.F.C.

- Cloich Cheann Fhaola - (I.F.C. Champions)

=== From S.F.C. ===
Relegated to 2022 Donegal I.F.C.

- One club from either Glenfin, Glenswilly, Réalt na Mara, Ard an Rátha, Milford, Na Cealla Beaga, Termon or Four Masters, according to 2021 Donegal Senior Football Championship#Relegation play-offs

== League stage ==
The draw was held on Tuesday evening, 21 June, at the Abbey Hotel in Donegal Town. The sixteen clubs were separated into two groups of eight. Four round-robin games for all clubs was the format, then the group standings amalgamated to decide on the competition's quarter-finalists. The first games were scheduled for 13–14 August, a weekend.

=== Table ===
Pos	Team	P	W	L	D	F	A	PD	Pts	Qualification
1	St Eunan's	4	4	0	0	78	35	+43	8	Advance to Quarter-finals
2	CLG Chill Chartha	4	4	0	0	93	51	+42	8	Advance to Quarter-finals
3	Aodh Ruadh Ballyshannon	4	4	0	0	61	40	+21	8	Advance to Quarter-finals
4	Naomh Conaill	4	3	0	1	63	44	+19	7	Advance to Quarter-finals
5	Gleann tSúilí	4	3	0	1	69	55	+14	7	Advance to Quarter-finals
6	Gaoth Dobhair	4	3	1	0	60	42	+18	6	Advance to Quarter-finals
7	CLG Na Cealla Beaga	4	3	1	0	65	51	+14	6	Advance to Quarter-finals
8	St Michael's	4	2	1	1	56	49	+7	5	Advance to Quarter-finals
9	Seán Mac Cumhaills	4	1	2	1	44	56	-12	3	
10	Four Masters	4	1	2	1	53	57	-4	3	
11	Gleann Fhinne	4	1	3	0	55	61	-6	2	
12	Cloich Cheann Fhaola	4	0	3	1	46	76	-30	1	
13	Réalt na Mara	4	0	4	0	48	75	-27	0	Advance to Relegation Playoff
14	CLG Naomh Náille	4	0	4	0	44	74	-30	0	Advance to Relegation Playoff
15	Ardara	4	0	4	0	43	74	-31	0	Advance to Relegation Playoff
16	Milford	4	0	4	0	37	75	-38	0	Advance to Relegation Playoff

=== Groups ===
Group A
Glenswilly
Gaoth Dobhair
St Eunan's
Na Cealla Beaga
Four Masters
Aodh Ruadh
Cill Chartha
St Michael's

Group B
Glenfin
Seán MacCumhaills
Milford
Cloich Cheann Fhaola
Ard an Rátha
St Naul's
Naomh Conaill
Réalt na Mara

=== Fixtures ===
Round 1: Na Cealla Beaga played Glenfin. Cill Chartha played Milford. Aodh Ruadh played Réalt na Mara. Four Masters played Cloich Cheann Fhaola. Glenswilly played Naomh Conaill. Gaoth Dobhair played Ard an Rátha. St Eunan's played St Naul's. St Michael's played Seán MacCumhaills.

Round 2: Cloich Cheann Fhaola played Cill Chartha. Glenfin played Gaoth Dobhair. St Naul's played Glenswilly. Seán MacCumhaills played Four Masters. Milford played St Michael's. Naomh Conaill played Na Cealla Beaga. Réalt na Mara played St Eunan's. Ard an Rátha played Aodh Ruadh.

The draw determined the first two sets of fixtures; the third and fourth sets of fixtures of the round-robin stage were not determined until the second and third rounds had concluded.

Round 3: On 27 August, St Eunan's played Cloich Cheann Fhaola, while Four Masters played Réalt na Mara. On 28 August, Na Cealla Beaga played Milford, Naomh Conaill played St Michael's, Cill Chartha played Ard an Rátha, Glenswilly played Glenfin, Gaoth Dobhair played Seán MacCumhaills, and Aodh Ruadh played St Naul's.

Round 4: All eight fixtures were played on 4 September. Na Cealla Beaga played Cloich Cheann Fhaola. Glenswilly played Ard an Rátha. Naomh Conaill played Gaoth Dobhair. St Michael's played St Naul's, with the former securing the last available place in the quarter-finals. Glenfin played Four Masters. St Eunan's played Seán MacCumhaills and finished top of the league stage on points difference, while Aodh Ruadh played Milford and Cill Chartha played Réalt na Mara.

== Quarter-finals ==
The first quarter-final ended with Cill Chartha defeating Na Cealla Beaga 1–14 to 1–7 at Tír Chonaill Park.

St Eunan's had a 16-point (2–15 to 0–5) win against St Michael's at Davy Brennan Memorial Park.

The other two quarter-finals saw Gaoth Dobhair emerge with a one-point (0–8 to 0–7) win against Aodh Ruadh at Fintra, while Naomh Conaill defeated Glenswilly by 2–10 to 0–10 at O'Donnell Park.

== Semi-finals ==
A draw was held to determine the semi-final pairings.

The first semi-final — between Cill Chartha and St Eunan's — was scheduled for 20:00 on Saturday 24 September at MacCumhaill Park, and to be streamed live (pay-per-view) on Donegal GAA TV, while the second semi-final — between Gaoth Dobhair and Naomh Conaill — was scheduled for 16:00 on Sunday 25 September also at MacCumhaill Park, and also to be streamed live (pay-per-view) on Donegal GAA TV. However, the first semi-final was postponed until the following weekend, due to bereavements (the father and sister of Brendan Devenney had both died, suddenly, and separately).

Naomh Conaill defeated Gaoth Dobhair by 0–13 to 1–8 in what was to have been the second semi-final, but ended up being the first played. St Eunan's defeated Cill Chartha by 1–13 to 1–11 in the other semi-final, with both victors qualifying for the 2022 championship final.

== Final ==
This was Naomh Conaill's sixth consecutive appearance in the final. The club won a sixth title.

Originally scheduled for 9 October 2022, the game was called off in the aftermath of the Creeslough explosion.

A minute's silence was held before the game. Black armbands were also worn.

Naomh Conaill won this one, but in controversial circumstances, and by one point, after St Eunan's player Shane O'Donnell was sent off for patting Jeaic Mac Ceallabhuí.

15 October 2022; Final	Naomh Conaill	1–9 — 2–5	St Eunan's	MacCumhaill Park; Referee: Mark Dorrian (Gaeil Fhánada); Man of the Match: Ciarán Thompson
15 October 2022; Final	Charles McGuinness 1-1; Ciarán Thompson (3f) 0-4; Brendan McDyer 0-3; Jeaic Mac Ceallabhuí 0-1	Report	Kevin Kealy, Eoin McGeehin 1-0 each; Niall O'Donnell (1f) 0-2; Sean McVeigh, Aaron Deeney, Conor Morrison 0-1 each	MacCumhaill Park; Referee: Mark Dorrian (Gaeil Fhánada); Man of the Match: Ciarán Thompson

== Ulster Senior Club Football Championship ==
Naomh Conaill advanced to the 2022 Ulster Senior Club Football Championship.

The club lost its quarter-final, on penalties.

== Relegation play-offs ==
Four teams qualified for the 2022 Donegal SFC relegation play-offs.

Both semi-finals were held on Sunday 25 September. Ard an Rátha v St Naul's was played at Eamonn O'Broinn Memorial Park from 13:00, and streamed live (pay-per-view) on Donegal GAA TV; Milford v Réalt na Mara was played at Páirc Aodh Rua from 13:30, and streamed live (and available for free) on Donegal Facebook.

The two losing semi-finalists were St Naul's (defeated by 3–6 to 0–9) and Réalt na Mara (defeated by 4–16 to 3–16, after extra time).

St Naul's — achieving a first win in the 2022 SFC — defeated Réalt na Mara by 0–13 to 1–6 in the play-off final at Tírconaill Park, thus relegating Réalt na Mara to the 2023 Intermediate Championship.

== Gradam Shéamuis Mhic Géidigh ==
On 12 December 2022, Brendan McDyer was named as the recipient of the annual Gradam Shéamuis Mhic Géidigh. RTÉ Raidió na Gaeltachta announced the decision. McDyer was not expecting to be selected. He received the award at an official function in Letterkenny on the evening of 14 December 2022.
