= 2015 Donegal Senior Football Championship =

Donegal S.F.C.
- Craobh Sinsear Peile; Dhún na nGall

Tournament details
- County: Donegal
- Year: 2015

Winners
- Champions: Naomh Conaill (3rd win)
- Manager: Martin Regan
- Captain: Leo McLoone

Promotion/Relegation
- Promoted team(s): Réalt na Mara
- Relegated team(s): Cloich Cheann Fhaola

The 2015 Donegal Senior Football Championship was the 93rd official edition of the Donegal GAA's premier club Gaelic football tournament for senior graded teams in County Donegal.

The defending champion was St Eunan's.

== Format ==
The 2015 championship took the same format as the 2014 championship, in which there were four groups of four clubs, with the top two clubs qualifying for the quarter-finals. The club finishing bottom in each group contested relegation play-offs to determine which team would be relegated to the 2016 Donegal Intermediate Football Championship.

== Group stage ==
=== Group 1 ===
Team	Pld	W	L	D	PF	PA	PD	Pts
Glenswilly	3	3	0	0	48	35	+13	6
Malin	3	1	1	1	45	48	-3	3
Gaoth Dobhair	3	1	2	0	43	45	-2	2
Seán Mac Cumhaills	3	0	2	1	43	51	-8	1

Round 1

- Gaoth Dobhair 1-8, 1-10 Glenswilly, Gaoth Dobhair, 23/5/2015
- Malin 1-13, 0-16 Seán Mac Cumhaills, Connolly Park, 24/5/2015

Round 2

- Seán Mac Cumhaills 2-8, 1-15 Gaoth Dobhair, MacCumhaill Park, 22/8/2015
- Glenswilly 3-9, 1-8 Malin, Glenswilly, 23/8/2015

Round 3

- Gaoth Dobhair 1-11, 3-9 Malin, Gaoth Dobhair, 30/8/2015
- Glenswilly 1-14, 2-7 Seán Mac Cumhaills, Glenswilly, 30/8/2015

=== Group 2 ===
Team	Pld	W	L	D	PF	PA	PD	Pts
Naomh Conaill	3	3	0	0	57	30	+27	6
St Eunan's	3	2	3	0	37	34	+3	4
An Clochán Liath	3	1	2	0	33	46	-13	2
Ard an Rátha	3	0	1	0	31	48	-17	0

Round 1

- Ard an Rátha 0-7, 2-10 St Eunan's, Ard an Rátha, 24/5/2015
- Naomh Conaill 2-14, 1-8 An Clochán Liath, Glenties, 24/5/2015

Round 2

- St Eunan's 0-7, 2-12 Naomh Conaill, O'Donnell Park, 4/10/2015
- An Clochán Liath 2-7, 0-12 Ard an Rátha, An Clochán Liath, 4/10/2015

Round 3

- St Eunan's 0-14, 1-6 An Clochán Liath, O'Donnell Park, 29/8/2015
- Ard an Rátha 1-9, 2-13 Naomh Conaill, Ard an Rátha, 30/8/2015

=== Group 3 ===
Team	Pld	W	L	D	PF	PA	PD	Pts
St Michael's	3	3	0	0	51	29	+22	6
Four Masters	3	2	1	1	48	49	+1	4
Glenfin	3	1	2	1	41	45	+4	2
Cloich Cheann Fhaola	3	0	3	2	34	51	-17	0

Round 1

- Glenfin 2-9, 3-9 Four Masters, Glenfin, 23/5/2015
- St Michael's 2-11, 0-7 Cloich Cheann Fhaola, Dunfanaghy, 24/5/2015

Round 2

- Four Masters 2-5, 3-12 St Michael's, Páirc Tír Chonaill, 23/8/2015
- Cloich Cheann Fhaola 1-11, 1-12 Glenfin, Cloughaneely, 24/8/2015

Round 3

- Glenfin 1-8, 2-7 St Michael's, Glenfin, 30/8/2015
- Four Masters 2-13, 1-10 Cloich Cheann Fhaola, 20/8/2015

=== Group 4 ===
Team	Pld	W	L	D	PF	PA	PD	Pts
Cill Chartha	3	3	0	0	57	29	+28	6
Termon	3	1	1	1	40	48	-8	3
Naomh Muire	3	1	1	1	37	45	-8	3
Na Cealla Beaga	3	0	3	0	33	45	-12	0

Round 1

- Cill Chartha 2-13, 0-8 Naomh Muire, Cill Chartha, 23/5/2015
- Termon 1-11, 0-12 Na Cealla Beaga, Termon, 23/5/2015

Round 2

- Na Cealla Beaga 2-4, 1-14 Cill Chartha, Na Cealla Beaga, 22/8/2015
- Naomh Muire 0-15, 1-12 Termon, The Banks, 22/8/2015

Round 3

- Cill Chartha 3-12, 1-8 Termon, Cill Chartha, 30/8/2015
- Naomh Muire 0-14, 2-5 Na Cealla Beaga, The Banks, 30/8/2015

== Knockout stage ==
=== Relegation play-offs ===
==== Relegation semi-finals ====
- Ard an Rátha 0-13, 2-7 Cloich Cheann Fhaola, Glenswilly, 12/9/2015,
- Seán MacCumhaills 3-12, 1-16 Na Cealla Beaga, Tir Conaill Park, 26/9/2015,
- Ard an Rátha 3-9, 0-6 Cloich Cheann Fhaola, Dungloe, 26/9/2015,

==== Relegation final ====
- Na Cealla Beaga 3-12, 0-11 Cloich Cheann Fhaola, The Banks, 3/10/2015,

=== Finals ===
Quarter-finals
Cill Chartha	3-13
Four Masters	0-8
Naomh Conaill	0-11
Termon	1-5
St Michael's	3-15
Malin	1-5
Glenswilly	0-8
St Eunan's	3-7

Semi-finals
Cill Chartha	0-10
Naomh Conaill	4-10
St Michael's	0-11
St Eunan's	2-15

Final
Naomh Conaill	0-11
St Eunan's	0-10

Quarter-finals

- Naomh Conaill 0-11, 1-5 Termon, MacCumhaill Park, 12/9/2016,
- Cill Chartha 3-13, 0-8 Four Masters, Killybegs, 12/9/2015,
- St Michael's 3-15, 1-5 Malin, O'Donnell Park, 13/9/2015,
- St Eunan's 3-7, 0-8 Glenswilly, MacCumhaill Park, 13/9/2016,

Semi-finals

- St Eunan's 2-15, 0-11 St Michael's, MacCumhaill Park, 26/9/2016,
- Naomh Conaill 4-10, 0-10 Cill Chartha, MacCumhaill Park, 27/9/2016,

Final

- Naomh Conaill 0-11, 0-10 St Eunan's, MacCumhaill Park, 18/10/2016, Andrew Mullin refereed
