= 2019 Donegal Senior Football Championship =

Donegal S.F.C.
- Season: 2019
- Champions: Naomh Conaill (4th title)
- Relegated: Malin
- All Ireland SCFC: Gaoth Dobhair
- Winning captain: Ciarán Thompson
- Man of the Match: Ethan O'Donnell
- Winning manager: Martin Regan
- Ulster SCFC: Gaoth Dobhair
- Matches: ??

The 2019 Donegal Senior Football Championship was the 97th official edition of Donegal GAA's premier Gaelic football tournament for senior graded clubs in County Donegal. 16 teams competed, with the winner representing Donegal in the Ulster Senior Club Football Championship. The championship began with four groups of four, and continued with a knock-out format.

The defending Donegal (and Ulster) champion was Gaoth Dobhair, after the club defeated Naomh Conaill by a scoreline of 0–17 to 1–7 in the 2018 final. However, Gaoth Dobhair failed to defend its crown, losing the final to Naomh Conaill, by one point, after a second replay.

This was Glenfin's return to the senior grade after a two-year exodus, when claiming the 2018 I.F.C. title.

Malin suffered relegated back to the 2020 I.F.C. after 16 seasons in the top-flight, when losing its relegation final. Back in 2003, Malin gained promotion to the S.F.C. for the first time in the club's history. Although Malin lost the I.F.C. quarter-final to eventual champion St Michael's that year, the club earned promotion to Division 1 from Division 2 of the Donegal Leagues. At that time, promotion to the S.F.C. could be acquired through the leagues.

== Team changes ==
The following teams changed division since the 2018 championship season.

=== To S.F.C. ===
Promoted from 2018 Donegal I.F.C.

- Glenfin - (I.F.C. Champions)

=== From S.F.C. ===
Relegated to 2019 Donegal I.F.C.

- Burt

== Format ==
The 2019 County Championship took the same format as previous championships in which there was four groups of four with the top two qualifying for the quarter-finals. Bottom of each group play in relegation play-offs to decide which team is relegated the 2020 Intermediate championship.

== Group stage ==
All 16 teams enter the competition at this stage. The top 2 teams in each group go into the Quarter-Finals while the bottom team of each group entered a Relegation Playoff.

=== Group A ===
Team	Pld	W	L	D	PF	PA	PD	Pts
Gaoth Dobhair	3	2	0	1	42	19	+23	5
St Eunan's	3	1	0	2	39	27	+12	4
St Michael's	3	1	1	1	48	39	+9	3
Ard an Rátha	3	0	3	0	32	76	-44	0

Round 1

- Ard an Rátha 2-10, 4-18 St Michael's, 7/9/2019
- Gaoth Dobhair 1-3, 0-6 St Eunan's, 8/9/2019

Round 2

- St Michael's 1-3, 1-8 Gaoth Dobhair, 14/9/2019
- St Eunan's 1-18, 1-6 Ard an Rátha, 15/9/2019

Round 3

- Ard an Rátha 0-7, 2-19 Gaoth Dobhair, 22/9/2019
- St Michael's 0-12, 0-12 St Eunan's, 22/9/2019

=== Group B ===
Team	Pld	W	L	D	PF	PA	PD	Pts
Naomh Conaill	3	3	0	0	52	27	+25	6
Na Cealla Beaga	3	2	1	0	42	39	+3	4
Seán Mac Cumhaills	3	1	2	0	50	41	+9	2
An Clochán Liath	3	0	3	0	36	67	-31	0

Round 1

- Seán Mac Cumhaills 5-14, 1-18 An Clochán Liath, 7/9/2019
- Naomh Conaill 1-15, 1-9 Na Cealla Beaga, 8/9/2019

Round 2

- An Clochán Liath 1-3, 2-16 Naomh Conaill, 14/9/2019
- Na Cealla Beaga 2-8, 1-9 Seán Mac Cumhaills, 15/9/2019

Round 3

- Naomh Conaill 0-12, 0-9 Seán Mac Cumhaills, 21/9/2019
- Na Cealla Beaga 0-16, 0-9 An Clochán Liath, 21/9/2019

=== Group C ===
Team	Pld	W	L	D	PF	PA	PD	Pts
Milford	3	2	1	0	47	43	+4	4
Glenfin	3	1	1	1	48	44	+4	3
Glenswilly	3	1	1	1	36	44	-8	3
Four Masters	3	1	2	0	37	37	+0	2

Round 1

- Four Masters 0-10, 0-14 Milford, 7/9/2019
- Glenfin 1-11, 0-14 Glenswilly, 8/9/2019

Round 2

- Milford 1-17, 3-8 Glenfin, 14/9/2019,
- Glenswilly 0-6, 2-11 Four Masters, 15/9/2019

Round 3

- Glenfin 1-14, 1-7 Four Masters, 22/9/2019
- Glenswilly 1-13, 2-7 Milford, 22/9/2019

=== Group D ===
Team	Pld	W	L	D	PF	PA	PD	Pts
Cill Chartha	3	3	0	0	75	32	+43	6
Réalt na Mara	3	2	1	0	56	54	+2	4
Termon	3	1	2	0	37	53	-16	2
Malin	3	0	3	0	41	70	-29	0

Round 1

- Termon 0-11, 0-12 Réalt na Mara, 8/9/2019
- Cill Chartha 3-16, 0-7 Malin, 8/9/2019

Round 2

- Réalt na Mara 1-13, 1-20 Cill Chartha, 15/9/2019
- Malin 1-11, 0-17 Termon, 15/9/2019

Round 3

- Malin 2-14, 2-22 Réalt na Mara, 22/9/2019
- Cill Chartha 3-18, 1-6 Termon, 22/9/2019

== Knock-out stage ==
=== Quarter-finals ===
28 September 2019	Cill Chartha	2-14 - 0-11	Na Cealla Beaga	MacCumhaill Park; Referee: ??? Man of the Match: ???

28 September 2019	St Eunan's	5-22 - 0-11	Milford	MacCumhaill Park; Referee: ??? Man of the Match: ???

29 September 2019	Gaoth Dobhair	2-20 - 2-17	Réalt na Mara	O'Donnell Park; Referee: ??? Man of the Match: ???

29 September 2019	Naomh Conaill	1-14 - 0-13	Glenfin	Glenswilly; Referee: ??? Man of the Match: ???

=== Semi-finals ===
6 October 2019	Naomh Conaill	0-15 - 1-11	St Eunan's	MacCumhaill Park; Referee: ??? Man of the Match: ???

6 October 2019	Gaoth Dobhair	3-8 - 0-12	Cill Chartha	MacCumhaill Park; Referee: ??? Man of the Match: ???

=== Final ===
20 October 2019; 16:00	Naomh Conaill	0-08 - 0-08	Gaoth Dobhair	MacCumhaill Park; Referee: Enda McFeely (St Mary's, Convoy); Man of the Match: Ciarán Thompson
20 October 2019; 16:00		Report		MacCumhaill Park; Referee: Enda McFeely (St Mary's, Convoy); Man of the Match: Ciarán Thompson

=== Final replay ===
27 October 2019; 15:00	Naomh Conaill	1-11 - 0-14	Gaoth Dobhair	MacCumhaill Park; Referee: Jimmy White (Killybegs)
27 October 2019; 15:00		Report		MacCumhaill Park; Referee: Jimmy White (Killybegs)

=== Final second replay ===
30 October 2019; 20:00	Naomh Conaill	0-8 - 0-7	Gaoth Dobhair	MacCumhaill Park; Referee: Seamus McGonagle (Aodh Ruadh)
30 October 2019; 20:00	Charlie McGuinness 0-2 (2f), Ciarán Thompson 0-2 (45), Leo McLoone, Ethan O'Donnell, Jeaic Mac Ceallabhuí and John O'Malley 0-1	Report	Michael Carroll 0-3, Cian Mulligan 0-2, Odhrán Mac Niallais 0-1, Eamonn Collum 0-1 (1f)	MacCumhaill Park; Referee: Seamus McGonagle (Aodh Ruadh)

== Relegation play-offs ==
=== Relegation semi-finals ===
5 October 2019	Four Masters	2-13 - 1-7	Malin	Convoy; Referee: ??? Man of the Match: ???

5 October 2019	An Clochán Liath	3-9 - 2-10	Ard an Rátha	Killybegs; Referee: ??? Man of the Match: ???

=== Relegation final ===
20 October 2019; 19:00	Ard an Rátha	2-14 - 3-8	Malin	Convoy; Referee: ??? Man of the Match: ???

== Gradam Shéamuis Mhic Géidigh ==
Ciarán Thompson was named as the recipient of the annual Gradam Shéamuis Mhic Géidigh.

== Television rights ==
The following matches were broadcast live on national television, unless otherwise indicated:

Round	RTÉ	TG4
Quarter-finals	St Eunan's v Milford; Cill Chartha v na Cealla Beaga	—
Semi-finals	—	Cill Chartha v Gaoth Dobhair (deferred)
Final	—	Gaoth Dobhair v Naomh Conaill
