= Brian McIver =

Gaelic football manager

Sport
Club management
- Years: Club
- c. 2002: Ballinderry Shamrocks
- 1
Inter-county management
- Years: Team
- 2005–2008 c. 2010 2012–2015: Donegal; Down (backroom); Derry
Inter-county titles as manager
County	League	Province	All-Ireland

Brian McIver is a Gaelic football manager who has been in charge of two county teams and been part of another that played in an All-Ireland Senior Football Championship final. He was the 2007 National Football League-winning manager.

A Tyrone native, McIver led Ballinderry Shamrocks to an All-Ireland Senior Club Football Championship. Appointed manager of Donegal (in what was his first involvement at inter-county level), McIver led Donegal to an Ulster Senior Football Championship final in his first championship campaign. He then led Donegal to a National League title in 2007. His time as Donegal manager also saw him give a 17-year-old Michael Murphy his debut and he gave Neil McGee, Frank McGlynn, Rory Kavanagh and Anthony Thompson their first championship starts.

McIver received a degree from Coleraine, a PGCE from Queen's University and a master's from Jordanstown. He headed to St Mary's, where his involvement with Paddy Tally began. Tally got involved with Down and brought McIver in along with him. McIver was part of the Down backroom team for the 2010 All-Ireland Senior Football Championship Final. McIver said in 2022 that he still thought Down would have won that game if Ambrose Rogers hadn't injured himself.

McIver was appointed Derry manager in 2012, being announced in the same month Jim McGuinness led McIver's former Donegal players to an All-Ireland Senior Football Championship title. Joe Brolly was particularly critical of McIver's management. McIver brought Derry to a Division 1 final in 2014. He quit the Derry management role in 2015, criticising Conor Lane on live television in his parting interview while confirming his departure. Earlier that season, he had criticised David Coldrick and then Ciaran Brannigan.

But McIver remained as Oak Leaf Director of Football. He spent three years as Oak Leaf Director of Football after quitting as Derry manager. He was reported to be stepping down after four years in 2019.

McIver's son Michael is a Gaelic footballer, and McIver has managed him.
