= 2010 Donegal Senior Football Championship =

- 2010 Craobh Sinsear Peile; Dhún na nGall

Tournament details
- County: Donegal
- Year: 2010

Winners
- Champions: Naomh Conaill (2nd win)
- Manager: Cathal Corey

Promotion/Relegation
- Promoted team(s): ?
- Relegated team(s): N/A

The 2010 Donegal Senior Football Championship was the 88th official edition of the Donegal GAA's premier club Gaelic football tournament for senior graded teams in County Donegal.

Naomh Conaill won the final, for the club's second title.

== Quarter-finals ==
The quarter-finals were played on Saturday 17 July, Saturday 24 July and Sunday 25 July.

17 July 2010; 18:30	Glenswilly	v	Gaoth Dobhair	O'Donnell Park, Letterkenny

24 July 2010	Four Masters	v	St Eunan's	MacCumhaill Park, Ballybofey

25 July 2010	Na Cealla Beaga	v	An Clochán Liath	Davy Brennan Memorial Park, Glenties

25 July 2010	Naomh Conaill	v	St Michael's	O'Donnell Park, Letterkenny

== Semi-finals ==
Naomh Conaill	2-13 to 2-8	Glenswilly	Letterkenny

Na Cealla Beaga	0-9 to 0-8	Four Masters

== Final ==
Naomh Conaill won the final at MacCumhaill Park in Ballybofey. The Donegal Champions went on to reach the final of the 2010 Ulster Senior Club Football Championship, knocking out Cavan champions Kingscourt, Monaghan champions Clontibret O'Neills and Tyrone champions Coalisland along the way.

3 October 2010	Naomh Conaill	1-15 - 0-8	Na Cealla Beaga	MacCumhaill Park, Ballybofey; Referee: Shaun McLaughlin (Malin); Man of the Match: Leo McLoone
3 October 2010	D. Molloy 1-4 (0-1f), L. McLoone 0-4, L. Thompson 0-3, A. Thompson 0-1, D. Gallagher 0-1, B. McDyre 0-1, M. Boyle 0-1		C. Molloy 0-3 (0-3f), K. Martin 0-2 (0-1f, 0-1 '45'), L. McNern 0-1, J. Noctor 0-1, P. McGinley 0-1	MacCumhaill Park, Ballybofey; Referee: Shaun McLaughlin (Malin); Man of the Match: Leo McLoone
