= 2007 National Football League (Ireland) =

Gaelic football competition

League details
- Dates: 3 February – 29 April 2007
- Teams: 32

League champions
- Winners: Donegal (1st win)
- Captain: Neil Gallagher
- Manager: Brian McIver

League runners-up
- Runners-up: Mayo
- Captain: Kevin O'Neill
- Manager: John O'Mahony

Other division winners
- Division 2: Meath

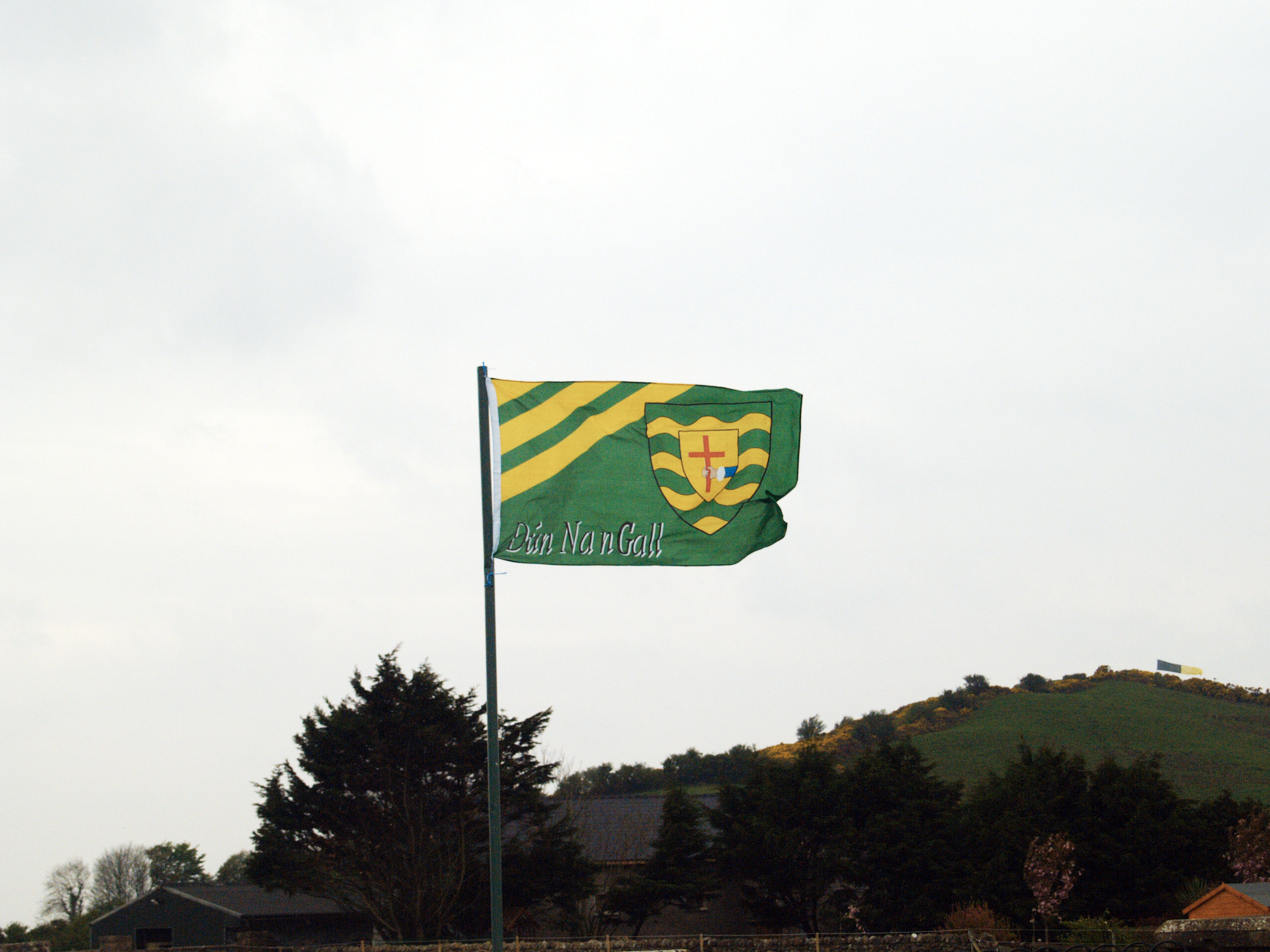
The Donegal flag displayed on the day the county won the National Football League for the first time

The 2007 National Football League was the Gaelic football league, contested by 32 GAA counties football teams, 31 from Ireland (as Kilkenny don't compete) and London from England.

Due to the extended reshuffling of the structure for the 2008 campaign, survival in Divisions 1A and 1B, was much more precarious—with four relegation places in these divisions, the bottom two teams were relegated to Division 3, and the teams finishing in 5th place and 6th places were relegated to Division 2.

Donegal won the 2007 National Football League by securing the Division One title, a historic achievement and their first National Football League title. They were unbeaten throughout the competition.

Meath won the Division Two title.

The Dublin vs. Tyrone match was the first Gaelic football match held in Croke Park under floodlights.

== Format ==
=== Division One ===
The top two teams from both division one A and B go on to qualify for the league semi finals and then the winning team goes on to qualify for the final. The winner of the final game are the football league champions. The bottom two teams in Division one A and B are relegated to Division three of the next format for 2008. The teams who finish in fifth and sixth place in Division A and B are relegated to Division two in the new 2008 format. The teams in first, second, third and fourth position in both Division A and B qualify to play in the new 2008 format in Division One.

=== Division two ===
The top two teams from Division two A and B go on to qualify for the division two semi finals. The winners of the semi-final go on to play in the Division two finals and the winner becomes the 2007 Division two champions. The top two teams in Division 2A and 2B go on to play in Division 2 in the 2008 format. The teams that finish in third and fourth position go on to play in Division 3 of the 2008 format and the bottom four teams will play in Division four of the 2008 format.

=== Scoring Difference ===
All of the final positions in the league will be determined by each team's scoring, there will be no playoffs in the 2007 National Football League. If two teams finish the league on the same points, the scores are then taken into consideration and the team with the best average go to the higher position. If the teams remain equal after the scores have been averaged out, the result of the game which involved the two teams will be seen as the deciding factor between the teams.

== Division One ==
=== Division 1A Table ===
Team	Pld	W	D	L	F	A	Diff	Pts	Notes
Donegal	7	6	1	0	10-79	8-64	+21	13	Advance to NFL semi-final
Mayo	7	6	0	1	8-72	5-66	+15	12	Advance to NFL semi-final
Kerry	7	4	1	2	3-78	6-62	+7	9	Remain in Division 1
Tyrone	7	3	1	3	3-68	6-69	–10	7	Remain in Division 1
Dublin	7	3	0	4	6-73	2-66	+19	6	Relegated to Division 2 of the 2008 NFL
Cork	7	3	0	4	7-61	4-70	+10	6	Relegated to Division 2 of the 2008 NFL
Limerick	7	1	1	5	6-67	8-73	–12	3	Relegated to Division 3 of the 2008 NFL
Fermanagh	7	0	0	7	4-53	8-81	–40	0	Relegated to Division 3 of the 2008 NFL

=== Division 1B Table ===
Team	Pld	W	D	L	F	A	Diff	Pts	Notes
Galway	7	5	0	2	6-68	2-66	+14	10	Advance to NFL semi-final
Kildare	7	4	2	1	2-77	4-66	+5	10	Advance to NFL semi-final
Derry	7	4	1	2	6-82	6-66	+16	9	Remain in Division 1
Laois	7	3	3	1	6-79	4-71	+14	9	Remain in Division 1
Westmeath	7	3	0	4	4-67	6-69	–8	6	Relegated to Division 2 of the 2008 NFL
Armagh	7	3	0	4	5-62	2-81	–10	6	Relegated to Division 2 of the 2008 NFL
Louth	7	2	1	4	8-77	7-86	–7	5	Relegated to Division 3 of the 2008 NFL
Down	7	0	1	6	2-73	8-79	–24	1	Relegated to Division 3 of the 2008 NFL

=== Semi-finals ===
15 April 2007

Mayo	2-10 – 1-12	Galway

Croke Park, Dublin

15 April 2007

Donegal	1-13 – 1-11	Kildare

Croke Park, Dublin
Attendance: 23,209

=== Final ===
22 April 2007
Final

Donegal	0-13 – 0-10	Mayo

Croke Park, Dublin

== Division 2A ==
Team	Pld	W	D	L	Pts diff	Pts
Monaghan	7	7	0	0	+40	14
Roscommon	7	5	0	2	+17	10
Longford	7	3	1	3	+31	8
Leitrim	7	4	0	3	+8	8
Offaly	7	3	1	3	+18	6
Clare	7	3	0	4	-5	6
Carlow	7	1	0	6	-51	2
London	7	0	0	7	-58	0

Yellow - Qualified for Division Two semi-finals White - relegated to Division Three Red - relegated to Division Four

=== Round One ===
February 4, 2007
First round

Carlow	1-09 – 0-17	Clare

Croke Park
Attendance:
Referee: Pat McEnaney

February 4, 2007
First round

Leitrim	0-12 – 0-11	Offaly

Attendance:
Referee:

February 4, 2007
First round

Roscommon	1-10 – 2-11	Monaghan

Attendance:
Referee:

February 4, 2007
First round

Longford	5-19 – 0-08	London

Attendance:
Referee:

=== Round Two ===
February 10, 2007
Second round

Monaghan	1-14 – 3-06	Longford

Attendance:
Referee:

February 11, 2007
First round

Offaly	3-12 – 1-08	Carlow

Attendance:
Referee:

February 11, 2007
First round

Clare	1-14 – 1-09	Leitrim

Attendance:
Referee:

February 11, 2007
First round

London	0-10 – 1-16	Roscommon

Attendance:
Referee:

=== Round Three ===
Date, 2007
Third round

Monaghan	0-00 – 0-00	Carlow

Attendance:
Referee:

Date, 2007
Third round

Roscommon	0-00 – 0-00	Clare

Attendance:
Referee:

Date, February 25, 2007
Third round

Longford	0-00 – 0-00	Offaly

Attendance:
Referee:

The result was declared null by the GAA; both points were awarded to Longford

Date, 2007
Third round

London	0-00 – 0-00	Leitrim

Attendance:
Referee:

=== Round Four ===
Date, 2007
Fourth round

Longford	1-14 – 0-10	Leitrim

Attendance:
Referee:

Date, 2007
Fourth round

Clare	0-06 – 0-19	Monaghan

Attendance:
Referee:

Date, 2007
Fourth round

Offaly	2-17 – 1-09	London

Attendance:
Referee:

Date, 2007
Fourth round

Carlow	1-10 – 2-09	Roscommon

Attendance:
Referee:

== Division 2B ==
Team	Pld	W	D	L	Pts diff	Pts
Cavan	7	5	2	0	+25	12
Meath	7	5	1	1	+25	11
Wexford	7	5	1	1	+25	11
Sligo	7	3	1	3	-1	7
Wicklow	7	3	0	4	-1	6
Antrim	7	2	0	5	-9	4
Tipperary	7	1	1	5	-22	3
Waterford	7	1	0	6	-42	2

Yellow - Qualified for Division Two semi-finals White - relegated to Division Three Red - relegated to Division Four

=== Round One ===
February 03, 2007
First round

Meath	2-07 – 0-13	Cavan

Croke Park
Attendance:
Referee: Pat McEnaney

February 4, 2007
First round

Wicklow	4-09 – 1-10	Antrim

Attendance:
Referee:

February 4, 2007
First round

Tipperary	1-12 – 0-15	Sligo

Attendance:
Referee:

February 4, 2007
First round

Waterford	2-13 – 1-12	Wexford

Attendance:
Referee:

=== Round Two ===
February 10, 2007
second Round

Antrim	1-11 – 2-12	Meath

Attendance:
Referee:

February 10, 2007
Second round

Cavan	0-17 – 0-10	Wicklow

Attendance:
Referee:

February 11, 2007
Second round

Wexford	0-16 – 0-07	Tipperary

Attendance:
Referee:

February 11, 2007
Second round

Sligo	0-14 – 1-08	Waterford

Attendance:
Referee:

=== Round Three ===
February 25, 2007
third Round

Waterford	0-8 – 1-13	Antrim

Attendance:
Referee:

February 25, 2007
Second round

Tipperary	0-12 – 1-14	Cavan

Attendance:
Referee:

February 25, 2007
Second round

Sligo	0-10 – 3-12	Meath

Attendance:
Referee:

February 25, 2007
Second round

Wicklow	0-6 – 1-06	Wexford

Attendance:
Referee:

=== Round Four ===
March 11, 2007
Fourth round

Cavan	1-09 – 0-10	Sligo

Breffni Park
Attendance:
Referee:

March 11, 2007
Fourth round

Meath	0-00 – 0-00	Tipperary

Páirc Tailteann
Attendance:
Referee:

March 11, 2007
Fourth round

Antrim	1-10 – 2-14	Wexford

Casement Park
Attendance:
Referee:

March 11, 2007
Fourth round

Waterford	0-08 – 2-08	Wicklow

Stadium
Attendance:
Referee:

== Semi-finals ==
=== Division One ===
Both played on Sunday, April 15, at Croke Park, Dublin Donegal v Kildare
Mayo v Galway

== Division Two ==
=== Semi-finals ===
Monaghan 0-11 Meath 3-09
Roscommon 2-13 v Cavan 0-14

=== Final ===
Roscommon 0-10 Meath 2-12

=== Final ===
29 April 2007
Final

Meath	2-12 – 0-10	Roscommon
	Report

Breffni Park, Cavan
