= MacCumhaill Park =

Sports stadium in Ireland

- Páirc Sheáin Mhic Cumhaill
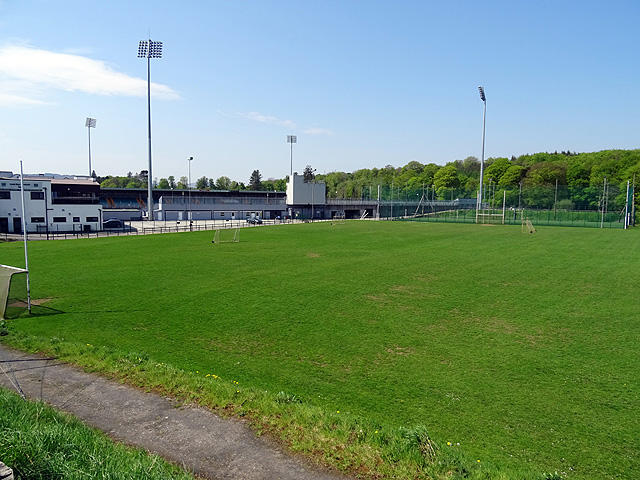

- Location within Ireland
- Full name: Seán MacCumhaill Park
- Address: Ballybofey, County Donegal, F93 E97E
- Location: Ireland
- Coordinates: 54°48′3.69″N 7°46′42.38″W
- Capacity: 17,500
- Field size: 145 x 90 m
- Public transit: Main Street bus stop (McElhinney's)

MacCumhaill Park (Irish: Páirc Sheáin Mhic Cumhaill) is a GAA stadium in Ballybofey, County Donegal, Ireland.

It is the home ground of the Seán MacCumhaills club and Donegal's Gaelic football and hurling teams.

The ground is named after Seán MacCumhaill and had a capacity of 13,000, but that was reduced to 12,250 after a safety audit report was released in February 2012. Donegal GAA announced in November 2012 plans to restore the capacity to 18,000, Work got underway in February 2013. and the related works were completed by late March 2013.

== See also ==
- List of Gaelic Athletic Association stadiums
- List of stadiums in Ireland by capacity
