= CLG Ard an Rátha =

Donegal-based Gaelic games club

- Ardara GAA
- Founded: 1921
- County: Donegal
- Colours: Green and yellow
- Grounds: Pearse Memorial Park

Playing kits
Standard colours

Senior Club Championships
| | All Ireland | Ulster champions | Donegal champions |
|---|---|---|---|
| Football: | - | - | 7 |

CLG Ard an Rátha is a GAA club based in Ardara in County Donegal. The Ard an Rátha in the club's title is the place name in Irish, while CLG refers to "GAA". They are one of the strongholds of Gaelic football in Donegal.

== History ==
The club was founded on 21 October 1921.

One of their county's more successful teams, they have won the Donegal Senior Football Championship on 6 occasions. Their most recent success was in 2004.

The team is perhaps most famous at national level for being the home club of Anthony Molloy, the first Donegal senior captain to lift the Sam Maguire Cup.

Paddy McGrath, a member of the 2012 All-Ireland SFC winning county team, currently plays for them. McGrath, along with Ardara teammates Conor Classon and Peter McNelis, was part of the Donegal under-21 squad which qualified for the 2010 All-Ireland Under-21 Football Championship final.

In May 2013, the men's team were forbidden from entering the All-Ireland Gaeltacht.

As of 2020, the manager was Damian Devaney.

== Notable players ==
- Gareth Concarr
- Damian Diver — played in four Ulster Senior Football Championship finals and an All-Ireland Senior Football Championship semi-final, losing them all
- Martin Gavigan — 1992 All-Ireland winner
- Paddy McGrath — the club's record holder of county accolades, including All-Ireland Senior Football, All-Ireland Under-21 Football runner-up and Ulster Senior Football Championships (these last X 5).
- Anthony Molloy — All-Ireland winning captain
- C. J. Molloy — American nephew of Anthony, played for New York in the All-Ireland Senior Football Championship before transferring to the club

== Honours ==
- Donegal Senior Football Championship: 1923, 1926, 1928, 1981, 2000, 2004
  - Runner-up: 1936, 1938, 1980, 1983, 1984
- Donegal Junior Football Championship: 1967, 1970
