= CLG Chill Chartha =

Donegal-based Gaelic games club

- CLG Chill Chartha
- Founded: 1924
- County: Donegal
- Colours: Blue and Gold
- Grounds: Towney Park
- Coordinates: 54°37′32.97″N 8°36′06.64″W

Playing kits
Standard colours

Senior Club Championships
	All Ireland	Ulster champions	Donegal champions
Football:	-	-	6

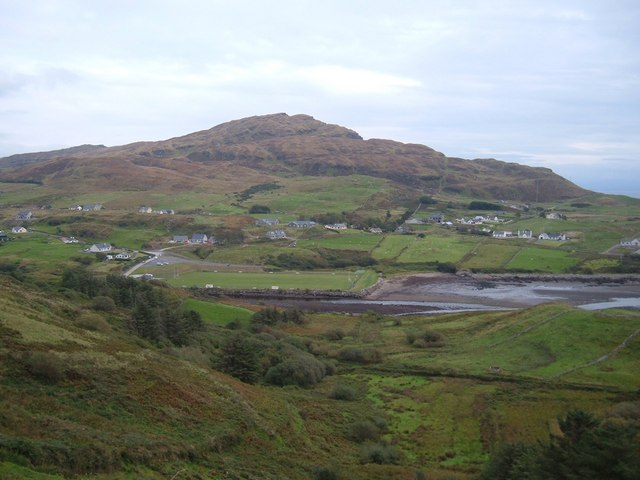
One of the club's GAA pitches in a rural setting

CLG Chill Chartha is a GAA club based in Kilcar, County Donegal, in Ulster, Ireland. They have won the Donegal Senior Football Championship on six occasions, the last in 2017, they won the Division One title on 14 occasions and are current All Ireland Comórtas Peile champions.

== History ==
The first recorded game was played on the beach in 1921, which was an inter-townland match between “Up the Glen” and Muckross.

The first official match played in Towney was between Ard na Ratha and “South of the County”. The first club match was played on November 9, 1924 against Ballyshannon in Towney, with the visitors winning 1-03 to 0-02. Over the following decades the club achieved success at all age levels and took part in the senior championships until 1967-69 when the club had to join forces with neighbouring parishes in order to field senior teams. The revival started when the club dropped to junior football in 1968 and three years later they won that championship and were back in the senior football championship in 1972. They have remained in the senior football championship ever since winning it five times, and with the under 21s winning three in a row in the early 1970s this was an indication of things that were to come, the success of the 1980s where they had three strong senior sides competing in all competitions. They were actually the first club in the county to have a third team.

In ten years after winning the junior championship their second team reached the junior championship final in 1981 and three years later they reached the intermediate final where they were narrowly defeated such was the strength of football in the parish.

In 1993 a team for the ladies was formed and in 2023 they picked up the Junior B championship and the Division Three league title.

They have provided players to the county teams over the course of their history with 20 different players making county Ulster championship appearances. That is not counting players who represented the county at league and underage level, a remarkable achievement when considering the size of the parish.

John McNulty, a former candidate for the Seanad, managed the club to Junior "B", Minor and Under-21 Championships and the 2014 Division 1 league title, though he did not win the Senior Football Championship.

The club celebrated their centenary in 2024.

They will host the Comortas Peile na Gaeltacht in 2026 (delayed two years due to COVID), which will be the second time in the club's history, with the last one held in 2004.

== Rivalries ==
The club has an intense rivalry with Na Cealla Beaga. The club also maintains a strong rivalry with their neighbours, Naomh Columba.

== Competitive record ==
=== Championship ===
The club won the Senior Championship for the first time in 1925 and the most recent was in 2017, following a 0–07 to 0–04 win over Naomh Conaill, the club's first win since 1993 (and sixth overall). In 2016, the club made its first final appearance since 1993 but lost to Glenswilly by a point. The club faced Naomh Conaill in the 2020 final, which was put on hold due to the impact of the COVID-19 pandemic on Gaelic games.

=== League ===
CLG Chill Chartha play in Division 1 of the Donegal All County league and are a record 14 times league champions (1933, 1935, 1959, 1975, 1979, 1981, 1982, 1983, 1984, 1987, 2014, 2016, 2017, 2019 and 2022). The club was relegated in 2009; despite finishing a point off a league semi place, the club went down after a number of play-offs. The club made its return to the top flight after winning the Division 2 title in 2011.

In 2014, the club won the senior Division One League title for the first time since 1987, following a 5–17 to 0–10 win away to Gaoth Dobhair.

=== Comórtas Peile ===
The club won the Comórtas Peile na Gaeltachta on seven occasions, the most recent being in 2024, and won the county Gaeltacht on ten occasions, the last being in 2024. The club also won the Junior Gaeltacht on two occasions, most famously in 1989, when it won both national titles at Naomh Columba.

Comórtas Peile na Gaeltachta , Sinsir, Buaiteoirí, (Na hEireann) (7)
- 1987 Cill Chartha 0–11 An Fhairche 0–10 (Béal an Mhuirthid)
- 1989 Cill Chartha 1–9 Naomh Columba 0–9 (Naomh Columba)
- 1990 Cill Chartha 2–13 Corca Dhuibhne 0–8 (Gallarus)
- 1991 Cill Chartha 1–12 Maigh Cuilinn 0–10 (Beal Átha Ghaothaigh)
- 2008 Cill Chartha 0–10 Naomh Columba 1–5 (Naomh Columba)
- 2014 Cill Chartha 3–14 Micheal Breathanach 0–13 (Maigh Cuilinn)
- 2024 Cill Chartha 0–20 Naomh Anna 1–8 (Cill na Martra)
Comórtas Peile na Gaeltachta , Sinsir, Buaiteoirí, (Dun na nGall) (10)
- 1970 Na Piarsaigh
- 1975 Cill Chartha 1–16 Ruagairí na Rosann 2–5 (Gaoth Dobhair)
- 1982 Cill Chartha 1–7 Ard a’ Rátha 0–3 (Gaoth Dobhair)
- 1987 Cill Chartha 0–8 Ard a’ Rátha 0–3 (Cloich Cheann Fhaola)
- 1989 Cill Chartha 0–15 Gleann Fhinne 0–5 (Cill Chartha)
- 1999 Cill Chartha 1–9 An Clochán Liath 0–10 (Naomh Mhuire)
- 2000 Cill Chartha 0–11 Ard A’ Ratha 0–9 (Cill Chartha)
- 2014 Cill Chartha 1–9 Gleann tSúilí 0–8 (Naomh Mhuire)
- 2019 Cill Chartha 1–9 Gaoth Dobhair 0–9 (Gaoth Dobhair)
- 2024 Cill Chartha 0–12 Gaoth Dobhair 0–10 (Cloich Cheann Fahola)

=== Underage ===
At underage level, the club has won the County Under 21 Championship on six occasions (1972, 1973, 1974, 2011, 2013 and 2015). The club won the Minor title on four occasions (1964, 1998, 2010 and 2012), along with a lot of underage honours.

== Notable players ==
- Michael Carr — 1983 Ulster Senior Football Championship final man of the match; 1980 Donegal Senior Football Championship final man of the match
- Michael Hegarty — 2011 Ulster SFC winner
- Patrick McBrearty — 2012 All-Ireland SFC winner and Stephen's brother
- Stephen McBrearty — Patrick's brother
- Andrew McClean
- Ciaran McGinley — Kilcar captain
- Eoin McHugh — James's son
- James McHugh — 1992 All-Ireland SFC winner and Martin's brother
- Mark McHugh — Martin's son and 2012 All-Ireland SFC winner
- Martin McHugh — 1992 All-Ireland SFC winner and James's brother
- Ryan McHugh — Martin's son and Mark's younger brother

== Managers ==
Years	Manager
1924–19??	—
c. 1999	Michael Molloy
c. 1999–20??	—
2007-2009	John McNulty
2010-2012	Seamus Cunningham
2013–2014	Rory Gallagher
2015	Michael Molloy
2016	Martin McHugh
2017–19	Barry Doherty
2019–2021	John McNulty
2022–2023	Conor Cunningham
2024	Michael Hegarty
2025–	Paul Devlin & Mark Sweeney

== Chairmen ==
The following men have been chairman of the club.

Years	Chairman
1976-77	Donnie Doherty
1978	Packie Haughey
1979-80	Seamus Doogan
1981	John Hegarty
1982	Seamus Doogan
1983-87	Charlie McDevitt
1988-89	Sean McGinley
1990	Michael Gillespie
1991	Seamus Gallagher
1992-94	Sean McGinley
1995-00	Charlie Ó Dónaill
2001-02	Charlie McDevitt
2003	Sean McGinley
2004	Paddy Sweeney
2005	Kevin Doogan
2006	Michael Doherty
2007	Kevin Doogan
2008-10	John Carr
2012-13	Kevin Doogan
2014-15	Michael McShane
2016	Declan Gallagher
2017-21	John Carr
2022	James Hegarty
2023-	Michael McShane

== Honours ==
- Donegal Senior Football Championship: 1925, 1980, 1985, 1989, 1993, 2017
- Donegal Senior League Winners (14): 1933, 1935, 1959, 1975, 1979, 1981, 1982, 1983, 1984, 1987, 2014, 2016, 2017, 2019
- Donegal Senior Football League Shield Championship: 1982, 1983, 1985
- Donegal Senior B Football Championship: 1991, 1994, 2011
- Donegal Senior Reserve Football League Championship: 1991, 1992, 1993, 2004, 2017
- Donegal Junior Football Championship: 1971, 1993
- Comórtas Peile na Gaeltachta Senior All Ireland Championship: 1987, 1989, 1990, 1991, 2008, 2014, 2024
- Comórtas Peile na Gaeltachta Senior Donegal Football Championship: 1970, 1975, 1982, 1987, 1989, 1999, 2000, 2014, 2019, 2024
- Comórtas Peile na Gaeltachta Junior All Ireland Championship: 1975, 1989
- Comórtas Peile na Gaeltachta Junior Donegal Championship: 1990, 2008
- Donegal Under-21 Football Championship: 1972, 1973, 1974, 2011, 2013, 2015
- Donegal Minor Football Championship: 1964, 1998, 2010, 2012
