= 2026 Donegal Senior Football Championship =

Sports competition

Donegal S.F.C.
- Season: 2026

The 2026 Donegal Senior Football Championship is scheduled to be the 103rd official edition of Donegal GAA's premier Gaelic football tournament for senior graded clubs in County Donegal. 16 teams compete, with the winner representing Donegal in the 2026 Ulster Senior Club Football Championship.

The defending champion is Naomh Conaill. Brendan McDyer, Leo McLoone and Anthony Thompson are bidding for a record ninth winners' medal, having each received an eighth winners' medal in 2025.

== Team changes ==
The following teams changed division since the 2025 championship season.

=== To S.F.C. ===
Promoted from 2025 Donegal I.F.C.

- Naomh Columba — (I.F.C. Champions)

=== From S.F.C. ===
Relegated to 2026 Donegal I.F.C.

- St Naul's

== Format ==
The format involves a league phase consisting of 32 games played on four different weekends, to reduce the number of clubs left in the competition by four.

== Teams ==
Club	Location	Manager(s)	2025 Championship Position	Championship Titles	Last Championship Title
An Clochán Liath	Dungloe		SFC quarter-finalist	7	1958
Aodh Ruadh	Ballyshannon		SFC relegation finalist	12	1998
Ard an Rátha	Ardara		SFC relegation semi-finalist	6	2004
Cill Chartha	Kilcar		SFC quarter-finalist	6	2017
Four Masters	Donegal		SFC semi-finalist	3	2003
Gaoth Dobhair	Gaoth Dobhair	Rónán Mac Niallais	SFC finalist	15	2018
Glenfin	Glenfin		SFC relegation semi-finalist	0	—
Glenswilly	Glenswilly	Gary McDaid	SFC preliminary quarter-finalist	3	2016
Na Cealla Beaga	Killybegs		SFC preliminary quarter-finalist	6	1996
Na Dúnaibh	Downings		SFC preliminary quarter-finalist	0	—
Naomh Columba	Gleann Cholm Cille		IFC winner	2	1990
Naomh Conaill	Glenties	Martin Regan	SFC winner	8	2025
Seán Mac Cumhaills	Ballybofey		SFC quarter-finalist	6	1977
St Eunan's	Letterkenny	Kieran Donnelly	SFC preliminary quarter-finalist	16	2024
St Michael's	Dunfanaghy	Cathal Sweeney & Raymond McLaughlin	SFC semi-finalist	0	—
Termon	Termon		SFC quarter-finalist	0	—

== League Phase ==
Advance to quarter-final Advance to preliminary quarter-final Advance to relegation playoffs

Pos	Team	Pld	W	D	L	F	A	Diff	Pts
1	Naomh Conaill	4	3	1	0	97	63	+34	7
2	St Eunan's	4	3	1	0	78	51	+27	7
3	An Clochán Liath	4	3	1	0	83	65	+18	7
4	Gaoth Dobhair	4	3	1	0	69	60	+9	7
5	Four Masters	4	3	0	1	85	66	+19	6
6	Cill Chartha	4	3	0	1	79	69	+10	6
7	Glenswilly	4	3	0	1	81	72	+9	6
8	Seán Mac Cumhaills	4	1	2	1	67	66	+1	4
9	Na Dúnaibh	4	1	1	2	72	82	-10	3
10	Termon	4	1	1	2	71	88	-17	3
11	Naomh Columba	4	1	0	3	61	71	-10	2
12	St Michael's	4	1	0	3	69	80	-11	2
13	Glenfin	4	1	0	3	68	81	-13	2
14	Ard an Rátha	4	1	0	3	60	74	-14	2
15	Na Cealla Beaga	4	0	0	4	58	73	-15	0
16	Aodh Ruadh	4	0	0	4	55	92	-37	0

=== Round 1 ===
8 August 2026; 17:00 IST (UTC+1); Round 1	Ghaoth Dobhair	1-13 (16) – (15) 0-15	St Michael's	Áras Mhic Eiteagáin, Gaoth Dobhair; Referee: James Connors (St Eunan's)
8 August 2026; 17:00 IST (UTC+1); Round 1	Eoin De Burca 0-4, Domhnall Mac Giolla Bhride 1-0, Ethan Harkin 0-3 (1tp), Daire Ó Baoill 0-3 (1tpf), Fionnan Coyle 0-1, Eamon McGee 0-1, Fiachra Coyle 0-1	Report	Michael Langan 0-5 (2tpf, 1f), Colin McFadden 0-3 (1tp), Max Roarty 0-2 (tp), Daniel McLaughlin 0-2, Andrew Kelly 0-2 (1f), Carlos O'Reilly 0-1	Áras Mhic Eiteagáin, Gaoth Dobhair; Referee: James Connors (St Eunan's)

8 August 2026; 17:00 IST (UTC+1); Round 1	St Eunan's	2-18 (24) – (12) 1-09	Aodh Ruadh	O'Donnell Park, Letterkenny; Referee: Mark Dorrian (Gaeil Fhánada)
8 August 2026; 17:00 IST (UTC+1); Round 1	Conor O'Donnell Jnr 0-6 (1f), James Kelly 2-0, Eoin McGeehin 0-3, Ciarán Moore 0-2, Conor O'Donnell Snr 0-2, Kieran Tobin 0-1, Brian MacIntyre 0-1, Eoin Dowling 0-1, John Hay 0-1, Oran Winston 0-1	Report	Colm McGloin 0-3, Donagh McIntyre 1-0, Nathan Boyle 0-3 (1tp, 1'45), Phillip Patton 0-1, Shane Delahunty 0-1, David Dolan 0-1	O'Donnell Park, Letterkenny; Referee: Mark Dorrian (Gaeil Fhánada)

8 August 2026; 19:30 IST (UTC+1); Round 1	Glenswilly	0-19 (19) – (17) 0-17	Termon	Páirc Naomh Columba, Glenswilly; Referee: Enda McFeely (Naomh Mhuire, Conmhaigh)
8 August 2026; 19:30 IST (UTC+1); Round 1	Michael Murphy 0-7 (1tpf, 1f), Shane Tinney 0-3 (1tp), Mark Collum 0-3 (1tp), Eoghan Scott 0-2 (tp), Matthew Enright 0-2, Kealan Dunleavy 0-2	Report	Ryan McFadden 0-8 (2tpf, 1tp, 1'45), John James Sweeney 0-4 (1tp), Daire McDaid 0-3 (1tpf), Bobby McGettigan 0-2	Páirc Naomh Columba, Glenswilly; Referee: Enda McFeely (Naomh Mhuire, Conmhaigh)

8 August 2026; 19:30 IST (UTC+1); Round 1	Naomh Conaill	2-13 (19) – (19) 0-19	Na Dúnaibh	Davy Brennan Memorial Park, Glenties; Referee: Ryan Walsh (Réalt na Mara)
8 August 2026; 19:30 IST (UTC+1); Round 1	Charlie McGuinness 1-2, Brendan McDyer 0-4 (1tp, 1f), Eoghan McGuinness 0-3, John O'Malley 1-0 (pen), Danny Brown 0-1, Eunan Doherty 0-1, Keelan McGill 0-1, Kevin McGettigan 0-1	Report	Patrick McElwee 0-12 (3tpf, 4f), Shane Coll 0-3 (1tp), Ronan Gallagher 0-2 (1'45), Keelan McGroddy 0-1, Cian McBride 0-1	Davy Brennan Memorial Park, Glenties; Referee: Ryan Walsh (Réalt na Mara)

9 August 2026; 14:00 IST (UTC+1); Round 1	Glenfin	1-17 (20) – (15) 0-15	Naomh Columba	Páirc Taobhoige, Glenfin; Referee: Anthony Finn (Naomh Colmcille)
9 August 2026; 14:00 IST (UTC+1); Round 1	Odhran O'Connor 0-5 (1f), Karl McGlynn 1-2, Shaun Ward 0-4 (1tp, 1f), Stephen Ward 0-2, Ross Ó Mearlaigh 0-2, Odhran McGlynn 0-1, Daniel McGlynn 0-1	Report	Aaron Doherty 0-7 (1tp, 1tpf, 2f), Shane Callaghan 0-5 (1f), Paul O'Hare 0-1, Ronan O'Hare 0-1, Padraig Byrne 0-1	Páirc Taobhoige, Glenfin; Referee: Anthony Finn (Naomh Colmcille)

9 August 2026; 15:15 IST (UTC+1); Round 1	An Clochán Liath	0-20 (20) – (13) 1-10	Seán Mac Cumhaills	Rosses Park, Dungloe; Referee: Marc Brown (Four Masters)
9 August 2026; 15:15 IST (UTC+1); Round 1	Oisín Bonner 0-6, Danny McCready 0-5 (1tp), Dylan Sweeney 0-4 (1tp), Shane McGee 0-2 (tp), Aaron Ward 0-2 (tp), Daire Gallagher 0-1	Report	Chad McSorley 1-3, Oisín Gallen 0-6 (4f), Seán MacMenamin 0-1	Rosses Park, Dungloe; Referee: Marc Brown (Four Masters)

9 August 2026; 16:00 IST (UTC+1); Round 1	Ard an Rátha	1-08 (11) – (18) 2-12	Chill Chartha	Pearse Memorial Park, Ardara; Referee: Val Murray (Aodh Ruadh)
9 August 2026; 16:00 IST (UTC+1); Round 1	Josh Malley 1-3, Eoghan Ban McNelis 0-3 (1tpf, 1f), Callum Malley 0-2	Report	Jack Hegarty 0-3 (2f), Stephen McBrearty 0-3 (1tp), Ryan McHugh 0-3 (1tp), Gary Molloy 1-0, Conor Doherty 1-0, Ciaran McGinley 0-2, Michael Gallagher 0-1	Pearse Memorial Park, Ardara; Referee: Val Murray (Aodh Ruadh)

9 August 2026; 16:00 IST (UTC+1); Round 1	Four Masters	0-15 (15) – (10) 0-10	Na Cealla Beaga	Páirc Tir Conaill, Donegal; Referee: Cathal Boland (Ard an Rátha)
9 August 2026; 16:00 IST (UTC+1); Round 1	Oisín Doherty 0-5 (3f), Killian Faulkner 0-3, Tiarnan McBride 0-2, Conor Reid 0-1, Tomás Carr 0-1, Thomas Lenehan 0-1, Paddy Reid 0-1, Leo McHugh 0-1	Report	Jack McSharry 0-3 (1tp), Hugh McFadden 0-3 (1tpf), Evan Broderick 0-2, Conor Cunningham 0-1 (f), Christopher Mulligan 0-1	Páirc Tir Conaill, Donegal; Referee: Cathal Boland (Ard an Rátha)

=== Round 2 ===
15 August 2026; 17:00 IST (UTC+1); Round 2	Naomh Columba	0-13 (13) – (19) 1-16	Ghaoth Dobhair	Páirc na nGael, Glenn Cholm Cille; Referee: Val Murray (Aodh Ruadh)
15 August 2026; 17:00 IST (UTC+1); Round 2	Aaron Doherty 0-5 (1tp, 2f), Shane Callaghan 0-2 (2f), Paul O'Hara 0-2 (tp), Alex Cunnea 0-2 (tp), Philip Doherty 0-1, Lanty Molloy 0-1	Report	Ethan Harkin 0-8 (1tpf, 2f, 1'45), Cathal Rua Gallagher 1-0, Adam Mac Iomhair 0-2 (tp), Cathal Mac Aoidh 0-1, Fionnan Coyle 0-1, Seán Paul Gallagher 0-1, Domhnall Mac Giolla Bhride 0-1, Stephen McFadden 0-1, Eamonn Collum 0-1	Páirc na nGael, Glenn Cholm Cille; Referee: Val Murray (Aodh Ruadh)

15 August 2026; 19:00 IST (UTC+1); Round 2	Aodh Ruadh	1-13 (16) – (25) 0-25	Naomh Conaill	Fr Tierney Park, Ballyshannon; Referee: Kevin McGinley (Naomh Columba)
15 August 2026; 19:00 IST (UTC+1); Round 2	Eoin Cassidy 0-4 (1tp), Senan Rooney 1-0, Nathan Boyle 0-2 (tp), Colm McGloin 0-2, David Dolan 0-2, Niall Murray 0-1, Philip Patton 0-1, Matt Gillespie 0-1	Report	Eoghan McGettigan 0-7 (1tp, 1f), Brendan McDyer 0-6 (1tp, 1f), Kieran Gallagher 0-2, John O'Malley 0-2 (tp), Ciarán Thompson 0-2 (tp), Mark Campbell 0-1, Danny Brown 0-1, Eunan Doherty 0-1, Max Campbell 0-1, Seamus Corcoran 0-1, Keelan McGill 0-1	Fr Tierney Park, Ballyshannon; Referee: Kevin McGinley (Naomh Columba)

16 August 2026; 14:00 IST (UTC+1); Round 2	Na Dúnaibh	1-11 (14) – (24) 1-21	Glenswilly	Páirc na nDúnaibh, Downings; Referee: Daniel Carlin (Naomh Pádraig)
16 August 2026; 14:00 IST (UTC+1); Round 2	Paddy McElwee 0-8, Paidin Shiels 1-0, Keelan McGroddy 0-1, Johnny McGroddy 0-1, Dylan McGlone 0-1	Report	Michael Murphy 0-10 (3tpf, 1f, 2'45), Seán Collum 1-0, Kealan Dunleavy 0-3 (1tp), Shane Tinney 0-3 (1f), Oisín McGrenra 0-2 (tp), Matthew Enright 0-1, Daithi Gildea 0-1, Caolan Kelly 0-1	Páirc na nDúnaibh, Downings; Referee: Daniel Carlin (Naomh Pádraig)

16 August 2026; 14:00 IST (UTC+1); Round 2	Seán Mac Cumhaills	0-14 (14) – (14) 1-11	St Eunan's	MacCumhaill Park, Ballybofey; Referee: Enda McFeely (Naomh Mhuire, Conmhaigh)
16 August 2026; 14:00 IST (UTC+1); Round 2	Jamie Keegan 0-3 (1tp), Aaron Kelly 0-3 (1tp, 1f), Chad McSorley 0-2, Seán Martin 0-2, Kevin McCormack 0-2, Shaun McMenamin 0-1, Conor McGinty 0-1	Report	Shane O'Donnell 0-4, Dylan Doogan 1-0, Conor O'Donnell Jnr 0-2 (tp), Eoin McGeehan 0-2, Noah Barrett 0-1, Luke McGuinness 0-1, James Kelly 0-1	MacCumhaill Park, Ballybofey; Referee: Enda McFeely (Naomh Mhuire, Conmhaigh)

16 August 2026; 16:00 IST (UTC+1); Round 2	Na Cealla Beaga	0-15 (15) – (18) 2-12	An Clochán Liath	Eamonn Byrne Memorial Park, Killybegs; Referee: Val Murray (Aodh Ruadh)
16 August 2026; 16:00 IST (UTC+1); Round 2	Hugh McFadden 0-6 (1tpf, 2tp), Conor Cunningham 0-4 (1tp, 1f), Ryan Cunningham 0-2, Seamus Óg Byrne 0-1, Jack McSherry 0-1, Odhran McGuinness 0-1	Report	Oisín Bonner 1-3 (1f, 1tpf), Dáire Gallagher 1-0, Shaun McGee 0-3 (1tp), Matthew Ward 0-2, Karl Magee 0-1, Ryan Connors 0-1 (f), Dylan Sweeney 0-1, Patrick O'Donnell 0-1	Eamonn Byrne Memorial Park, Killybegs; Referee: Val Murray (Aodh Ruadh)

16 August 2026; 16:00 IST (UTC+1); Round 2	Termon	4-07 (19) – (14) 1-11	Glenfin	The Burn Road, Termon; Referee: Marc Brown (Four Masters)
16 August 2026; 16:00 IST (UTC+1); Round 2	Ryan McFadden 0-4 (1tpf, 1f), Patrick Fegan 1-0, Jack Alcorn 1-0, Shea Boyle 1-0, Cormac Gallagher 1-0, Ciarán Cassidy 0-2, John James Sweeney 0-1	Report	Shaun Ward 0-9 (2'45, 1tp, 2tpf), Odhran O'Connor 1-0, Luke McGlynn 0-1, Karl McGlynn 0-1	The Burn Road, Termon; Referee: Marc Brown (Four Masters)

16 August 2026; 16:30 IST (UTC+1); Round 2	St Michael's	1-16 (19) – (17) 2-11	Ard an Rátha	The Bridge, Dunfanaghy; Referee: Andrew McCallig (Naomh Ultan)
16 August 2026; 16:30 IST (UTC+1); Round 2	Michael Langan 0-5 (1tp, 1tpf), Daniel McLaughlin 0-4 (1f), Colin McFadden 1-1, Edward O'Reilly 0-3, Martin McElhinney 0-1, Carlos O'Reilly 0-1, Max Roarty 0-1	Report	Eoghan Ban McNelis 1-4 (1tp), Eoghan Gallagher 1-3 (1tp), Paddy Gallagher 0-1 ('45), Shane Sweeney 0-1, Josh Malley 0-1, Callum Malley 0-1	The Bridge, Dunfanaghy; Referee: Andrew McCallig (Naomh Ultan)

The game between Cill Chartha and Four Masters was postponed to respect the deaths of James and Noreen McHugh.

29 August 2026; 14:00 IST (UTC+1); Round 2	Chill Chartha	2-17 (23) – (20) 1-17	Four Masters	Towney Park, Kilcar; Referee: Mark Dorrian (Gaeil Fhánada)
29 August 2026; 14:00 IST (UTC+1); Round 2	Eoin McHugh 1-4 (2tp), Ryan McShane 1-1, Ryan McHugh 0-4 (1tpf, 1t[), Jack Hegarty 0-4 (2f), Ciaran McGinley 0-2 (tp), Michael Gallagher 0-1, Liam McLaughlin 0-1	Report	Oisín Doherty 0-6 (1tp, 1tpf, 1f), Conor McCahill 0-5 (1tpf), Seanán Carr 1-0, Turlough Carr 0-3, Kevin Muldoon 0-2, Tómas Carr 0-1	Towney Park, Kilcar; Referee: Mark Dorrian (Gaeil Fhánada)

=== Round 3 ===
22 August 2026; 15:00 IST (UTC+1); Round 3	Glenswilly	1-18 (21) – (16) 0-16	Na Cealla Beaga	Páirc Naomh Columba, Glenswilly; Referee: Anthony Finn (Naomh Colmcille)
22 August 2026; 15:00 IST (UTC+1); Round 3	Shane Tinney 0-4 (1tpf, 1f), Daithi Gildea 0-4, Reid Kelly 0-3, Cormac Callaghan 1-0, Kealan Dunleavy 0-2, Eoghan Scott 0-1, Donal Gallagher 0-1, Matthew Enright 0-1, Padraig Devine 0-1, Caolan Kelly 0-1	Report	Hugh McFadden 0-6 (1tp, 1tpf, 1'45), Jack McSherry 0-3, Ryan Cunningham 0-3 (1tpf, 1f), Conor Cunningham 0-3 (1tpf), Rory Colyer 0-1	Páirc Naomh Columba, Glenswilly; Referee: Anthony Finn (Naomh Colmcille)

22 August 2026; 17:00 IST (UTC+1); Round 3	Glenfin	2-11 (17) – (22) 2-16	Chill Chartha	Páirc Taobhoige, Glenfin; Referee: James Connors (St Eunan's)
22 August 2026; 17:00 IST (UTC+1); Round 3	Odhran O'Connor 1-3 (1f), Shaun Ward 0-4 (1tp, 1tpf), Seaghan McCormick 1-0, Oisín McGlynn 0-1, Daniel Marley 0-1 (f), Ross Ó Mearlaigh 0-1, Odhran McGlynn 0-1	Report	Jack Hegarty 2-3 (1f), Eoin McHugh 0-4, Ciaran McGinley 0-3, Ryan McHugh 0-2 (1f), Conor Doherty 0-1, Stephen McBrearty 0-1, Michael Gallagher 0-1, Brian O'Donnell 0-1	Páirc Taobhoige, Glenfin; Referee: James Connors (St Eunan's)

22 August 2026; 19:30 IST (UTC+1); Round 3	Naomh Conaill	3-23 (32) – (12) 1-09	Termon	Davy Brennan Memorial Park, Glenties; Referee: Mark Dorrian (Gaeil Fhánada)
22 August 2026; 19:30 IST (UTC+1); Round 3	Shea Malone 1-6, Eoghan McGettigan 1-2, Brendan McDyer 1-1, Ciarán Thompson 0-4 (1tpf, 1tp), Ciaran Gallagher 0-3 (1tp), John O'Malley 0-2 (tp), Danny Brown 0-2, Charlie McGuinness 0-2, Odhran Doherty 0-1	Report	John James Sweeney 0-3, Patrick Fagan 1-0, Enda McCormick 0-2, Daire McDaid 0-2 (1f), Ryan McFadden 0-1, Ciaran Cassidy 0-1	Davy Brennan Memorial Park, Glenties; Referee: Mark Dorrian (Gaeil Fhánada)

23 August 2026; 14:00 IST (UTC+1); Round 3	An Clochán Liath	0-22 (22) – (14) 2-08	Na Dúnaibh	Rosses Park, Dungloe; Referee: Andrew McCallig (Naomh Ultan)
23 August 2026; 14:00 IST (UTC+1); Round 3	Damien McGowan 0-7 (3tpf, 1'45), Luke Cherkin 0-5 (1tpf), Oisin Bonner 0-5 (2f), Aaron Neely 0-3, Shaun McGee 0-2	Report	Ronan Gallagher 1-4 (1pen, 2tpf), James Travers 1-0, Patrick McElwee 0-2 (2f), Cian McBride 0-1, Keelan McGroddy 0-1	Rosses Park, Dungloe; Referee: Andrew McCallig (Naomh Ultan)

23 August 2026; 14:00 IST (UTC+1); Round 3	Ard an Rátha	2-13 (19) – (15) 2-09	Aodh Ruadh	Pearse Memorial Park, Ardara; Referee: Enda McFeely (Naomh Mhuire, Conmhaigh)
23 August 2026; 14:00 IST (UTC+1); Round 3	Shane Sweeney 2-0, Callum Malley 0-4, Eoghan Ban McNelis 0-4 (1tp, 2f), Paddy McGrath 0-1, John Ross Molloy 0-1, Eoghan Gallagher 0-1, Josh Malley 0-1, Kian McCabe 0-1	Report	Darragh Dolan 1-0, Colm McGloin 1-0, Senan Rooney 0-2, Philip Patton 0-2, Nathan Boyle 0-2, Eddie Lynch 0-1, Damien Weber 0-1 (f), Jack Gallagher 0-1	Pearse Memorial Park, Ardara; Referee: Enda McFeely (Naomh Mhuire, Conmhaigh)

23 August 2026; 14:00 IST (UTC+1); Round 3	St Eunan's	1-16 (19) – (11) 1-08	Naomh Columba	O'Donnell Park, Letterkenny; Referee: Martin McCormick (Glenfin)
23 August 2026; 14:00 IST (UTC+1); Round 3	Eoin McGeehin 1-4 (1tp), Conor O'Donnell Jnr 0-3 (1f), James Kelly 0-2, Luke McGuinness 0-2, Eoin Dowling 0-2, Shaun Patton 0-2 (tpf), Shane O'Donnell 0-1	Report	Aaron Doherty 0-5 (1tp, 1f), Fionn Gallagher 1-0, Padraig Byrne 0-2 (tpf), Shane Callaghan 0-1 (f)	O'Donnell Park, Letterkenny; Referee: Martin McCormick (Glenfin)

23 August 2026; 16:30 IST (UTC+1); Round 3	Ghaoth Dobhair	1-12 (15) – (15) 0-15	Seán Mac Cumhaills	Áras Mhic Eiteagáin, Gaoth Dobhair; Referee: Cathal Boland (Ard an Rátha)
23 August 2026; 16:30 IST (UTC+1); Round 3	Ethan Harkin 0-5 (1tp), Eamonn Collum 1-1, Eoin de Burca 0-3, Domhnall Mac Giolla Bhríde 0-3 (1tp)	Report	Jamie Keegan 0-4 (1tp), Aaron Kelly 0-4 (2f, 1'45), Chad McSorley 0-3, Oisín Gallen 0-2 (1f), Thomas McNulty 0-1, Kevin McCormack 0-1	Áras Mhic Eiteagáin, Gaoth Dobhair; Referee: Cathal Boland (Ard an Rátha)

23 August 2026; 16:30 IST (UTC+1); Round 3	Four Masters	1-23 (26) – (21) 2-15	St Michael's	Páirc Tir Conaill, Donegal; Referee: Ryan Walsh (Réalt na Mara)
23 August 2026; 16:30 IST (UTC+1); Round 3	Oisín Doherty 0-10 (4f, 1tp), Kevin Muldoon 1-1, Thomas Lenehan 0-2, David Monaghan 0-2, Seanan Carr 0-2, Conor Reid 0-2, Turlough Carr 0-2, Patrick Reid 0-1, Alex McCalmont 0-1	Report	David McLaughlin 0-5 (1tpf), Carlos O'Reilly 0-5, Eddie O'Reilly 1-0, Andrew Kelly 1-0, Michael McGinley 0-1, Michael Langan 0-1 ('45), Patrick Spiers 0-1, Colin McFadden 0-1	Páirc Tir Conaill, Donegal; Referee: Ryan Walsh (Réalt na Mara)

=== Round 4 ===
6 September 2026; 15:00 IST (UTC+1); Round 4	Aodh Ruadh	1-09 (12) – (24) 3-15	Four Masters	Fr Tierney Park, Ballyshannon; Referee: Andrew McCallig (Naomh Ultan)
6 September 2026; 15:00 IST (UTC+1); Round 4	David Dolan 0-6 (1tp, 4f), Donagh McIntyre 1-0, Matt Gillespie 0-1, Damian Weber 0-1	Report	Oisín Doherty 1-6 (1tp, 1tpf), Conor McCahill 1-3 (1f), Senan Carr 1-1, Kevin Muldoon 0-2, Alex McCalmont 0-1, David Monaghan 0-1, Caolan McSweeney 0-1	Fr Tierney Park, Ballyshannon; Referee: Andrew McCallig (Naomh Ultan)

6 September 2026; 15:00 IST (UTC+1); Round 4	Termon	2-17 (23) – (23) 3-14	An Clochán Liath	The Burn Road, Termon; Referee: James Connors (St Eunan's)
6 September 2026; 15:00 IST (UTC+1); Round 4	Enda McCormick 1-5 (2'45, 1tp), Ryan McFadden 0-5 (1'45, 1f), Aaron Reid 1-0, John James Sweeney 0-3 (1tp), Patrick Fegan 0-2 (1f), Jack Alcorn 0-2 (tp),	Report	Conor Greene 1-2, Aaron Neely 1-1, Ryan Connors 1-0, Shaun McGee 0-2 (tp), Daire Gallagher 0-2, Aaron Ward 0-2 (tp), Luke Clerkin 0-2, Darren Curran 0-1, Matthew Ward 0-1, Dylan Sweeney 0-1	The Burn Road, Termon; Referee: James Connors (St Eunan's)

6 September 2026; 15:00 IST (UTC+1); Round 4	Chill Chartha	1-13 (16) – (21) 1-18	Naomh Conaill	Towney Park, Kilcar; Referee: Enda McFeely (Naomh Mhuire, Conmhaigh)
6 September 2026; 15:00 IST (UTC+1); Round 4	Ryan McHugh 0-5 (1tpf, 2f), Jack Hegarty 0-4 (1tp), Oran Hegarty 1-0, Ryan McShane 0-1, Conor Doherty 0-1, Michael Gallagher 0-1, Ciaran McGinley 0-1	Report	Jeaic Mac Ceallabhuí 1-2, Eoghan McGettigan 0-5 (2f), Shea Malone 0-3 (1f, 1'45), Odhran Doherty 0-3, John O'Malley 0-2 (tp), Kevin McGettigan 0-1, Finnbarr Roarty 0-1, Brendan McDyer 0-1	Towney Park, Kilcar; Referee: Enda McFeely (Naomh Mhuire, Conmhaigh)

6 September 2026; 15:00 IST (UTC+1); Round 4	Naomh Columba	1-19 (22) – (13) 1-10	Ard an Rátha	Páirc na nGael, Glenn Cholm Cille; Referee: Marc Brown (Four Masters)
6 September 2026; 15:00 IST (UTC+1); Round 4	Shane Callaghan 0-7 (1tp, 1tpf), Kevin McNern 1-0, Michael Callaghan 0-3 (1tp), Aaron Doherty 0-2 (1f), Darragh Cunningham 0-2, Lanty Molloy 0-2, Alex Cunnea 0-1, Paul O'Hare 0-1, Padraig Byrne 0-1 ('45)	Report	Karl Joseph Molloy 1-2, Eoghan Ban McNellis 0-4 (2tpf), Shane Sweeney 0-2 (tpf), Eoghan Gallagher 0-1	Páirc na nGael, Glenn Cholm Cille; Referee: Marc Brown (Four Masters)

6 September 2026; 15:00 IST (UTC+1); Round 4	Na Dúnaibh	2-19 (25) – (17) 1-14	Glenfin	Páirc na nDúnaibh, Downings; Referee: Mark Dorrian (Gaeil Fhánada)
6 September 2026; 15:00 IST (UTC+1); Round 4	Patrick McElwee 0-14 (2tpf, 2tp, 3f), Johnny McGroddy 1-2 (1tp), Dylan McGlone 1-0, Keelan McGroddy 0-3 (1tp)	Report	Shaun Ward 0-7 (1tp, 1tpf, 3f), Odhran O'Connor 1-1, Seaghan McCormick 0-3, Karl McGlynn 0-1, Luke McGlynn 0-1, Jason Morrow 0-1	Páirc na nDúnaibh, Downings; Referee: Mark Dorrian (Gaeil Fhánada)

6 September 2026; 15:00 IST (UTC+1); Round 4	St Michael's	0-14 (14) – (21) 1-18	St Eunan's	The Bridge, Dunfanaghy; Referee: Cathal Boland (Ard an Rátha)
6 September 2026; 15:00 IST (UTC+1); Round 4	Michael Langan 0-6 (1tp, 1tpf, 1f, 1s/l), Daniel McLaughlin 0-4 (1tp, 2f), Andrew Kelly 0-1 (f), Colin McFadden 0-1, Max Roarty 0-1, Carlos O'Reilly 0-1	Report	Conor O'Donnell Jnr 0-6 (2tpf, 1f), Shane O'Donnell 0-5 (2tp), Eoin McGeehin 0-4, Kieran Tobin 1-0, Conor O'Donnell Snr 0-2 (tp), Eoin Dowling 0-1	The Bridge, Dunfanaghy; Referee: Cathal Boland (Ard an Rátha)

6 September 2026; 15:00 IST (UTC+1); Round 4	Seán Mac Cumhaills	1-22 (25) – (17) 2-11	Glenswilly	MacCumhaill Park, Ballybofey; Referee: Val Murray (Aodh Ruadh)
6 September 2026; 15:00 IST (UTC+1); Round 4	Jamie Keegan 0-9 (1tp, 2f), Kevin McCormick 1-3, Aaron Kelly 0-2, Oisín Gallen 0-2, Seán McMenamin 0-2, Seán Martin 0-1, Luke Gavigan 0-1, Conor McGinty 0-1, Chad McSorley 0-1	Report	Michael Murphy 1-3 (2f), Oisín McGrenra 1-0, Donal Gallagher 0-2 (tp), Mark Collum 0-2, Mark Bonner 0-1, Shane Tinney 0-1, Daithí Gildea 0-1, Caolan Kelly 0-1	MacCumhaill Park, Ballybofey; Referee: Val Murray (Aodh Ruadh)

6 September 2026; 15:00 IST (UTC+1); Round 2	Na Cealla Beaga	2-11 (17) – (19) 1-16	Ghaoth Dobhair	Eamonn Byrne Memorial Park, Killybegs; Referee: Ryan Walsh (Réalt na Mara)
6 September 2026; 15:00 IST (UTC+1); Round 2	Hugh McFadden 1-4, Ryan Cunningham 1-3, Jack McSharry 0-2, Rory Colyer 0-1, Evan Broderick 0-1	Report	Eamon Collum 0-5 (1tp), Cathal Gillespie 1-1, Ethan Harkin 0-3 (1tp), Daire Ó Baoill 0-3 (1tp), Fionan Coyle 0-2, Aodhan Breathnach 0-1	Eamonn Byrne Memorial Park, Killybegs; Referee: Ryan Walsh (Réalt na Mara)

== Preliminary quarter-finals ==
Preliminary round
12 September, Donegal
Four Masters	1-16
St Michael's	2-18
13 September, Glenswilly
Glenswilly	1-13
Termon	0-11
13 September, Kilcar
Chill Chartha	0-13
Naomh Columba	0-11
12 September, Ballybofey
Seán Mac Cumhaills	3-15
Na Dúnaibh	2-11

Quarter-finals
27 September, Letterkenny
St Michael's	0-09
Glenswilly	1-13
27 September, Ballyshannon
Naomh Conaill	3-13
Chill Chartha	0-16
26 September, Letterkenny
Ghaoth Dobhair	1-18
Seán Mac Cumhaills	1-15
26 September, Ballybofey
An Clochán Liath	0-18
St Eunan's	1-18

Semi-finals
4 October, Ballybofey
Glenswilly	0-19
Naomh Conaill (AET)	0-22
3 October, Ballybofey
Ghaoth Dobhair	1-19
St Eunan's	2-18

Final
Naomh Conaill
St Eunan's

The preliminary quarter-finals consists of the teams that finished 5th to 12th in the league phase. The pairings work as such:

- 5th (H) vs 12th
- 6th (H) vs 11th
- 7th (H) vs 10th
- 8th (H) vs 9th

12 September 2026; 17:00 IST (UTC+1); Preliminary Quarter-final	Four Masters	1-16 (19) – (24) 2-18	St Michael's	Páirc Tir Conaill, Donegal; Referee: Val Murray (Aodh Ruadh)
12 September 2026; 17:00 IST (UTC+1); Preliminary Quarter-final	Conor McCahill 1-3, Oisín Doherty 0-6 (2f), Kevin Muldoon 0-3, Senan Carr 0-2 (tp), Turlough Carr 0-1, Oisín Reid 0-1	Report	Michael Langan 0-8 (3tp, 1tpf), Max Roarty 1-3 (1tp), Daniel McLaughlin 0-5 (1tpf, 1tp), Colin McFadden 1-0, Carlos O'Reilly 0-1	Páirc Tir Conaill, Donegal; Referee: Val Murray (Aodh Ruadh)

12 September 2026; 19:30 IST (UTC+1); Preliminary Quarter-final	Seán Mac Cumhaills	3-15 (24) – (17) 2-11	Na Dúnaibh	MacCumhaill Park, Ballybofey; Referee: James Connors (St Eunan's)
12 September 2026; 19:30 IST (UTC+1); Preliminary Quarter-final	Oisín Gallen 3-3 (2pen), Kevin McCormick 0-6, Luke Gavigan 0-2 (tp), Conor McGinty 0-2, Aaron Kelly 0-1, Adam Byrne 0-1	Report	Johnny McGroddy 1-3 (1tp), Paddy McElwee 0-6 (3f, 1tpf), Ronan Pasoma 1-0, Ronan Gallagher 0-2 (tpf)	MacCumhaill Park, Ballybofey; Referee: James Connors (St Eunan's)

13 September 2026; 14:00 IST (UTC+1); Preliminary Quarter-final	Glenswilly	1-13 (16) – (11) 0-11	Termon	Páirc Naomh Columba, Glenswilly; Referee: Martin McCormick (Glenfin)
13 September 2026; 14:00 IST (UTC+1); Preliminary Quarter-final	Michael Murphy 1-6 (1tp, 2f), Mark Bonner 0-2, Reid Kelly 0-2, Donal Gallagher 0-1, Seán Collum 0-1, Mark Collum 0-1	Report	Daire McDaid 0-5 (1f), Ryan McFadden 0-3 (1tp), Jack Alcorn 0-2, Shea Boyle 0-1	Páirc Naomh Columba, Glenswilly; Referee: Martin McCormick (Glenfin)

13 September 2026; 16:30 IST (UTC+1); Preliminary Quarter-final	Chill Chartha	0-13 (13) – (11) 0-11	Naomh Columba	Towney Park, Kilcar; Referee: Cathal Boland (Ard an Rátha)
13 September 2026; 16:30 IST (UTC+1); Preliminary Quarter-final	Ryan McHugh 0-5 (1f, 1tpf), Brian O'Donnell 0-2 (1m), Ciaran McGinley 0-2, Michael Gallagher 0-2, Oran Doogan 0-1, Jack Hegarty 0-1	Report	Aaron Doherty 0-6 (2tp), Ryan McNern 0-1, Paul O'Hare 0-1, Shane Callaghan 0-1 (f), Kevin McNern 0-1, Michael Callaghan 0-1	Towney Park, Kilcar; Referee: Cathal Boland (Ard an Rátha)

== Quarter-finals ==
26 September 2026; 14:30 IST (UTC+1); Quarter-final	Ghaoth Dobhair	1-18 (21) – (18) 1-15	Seán Mac Cumhaills	O'Donnell Park, Letterkenny; Referee: Martin McCormick (Glenfin)
26 September 2026; 14:30 IST (UTC+1); Quarter-final	Eamonn Collum 1-2, Ethan Harkin 0-4 (1f), Adam Mac Íomhair 0-4 (2tp), Cathal Gillespie 0-3, Jordi Gribben 0-2, Eoin de Búrca 0-1, Fionnan Coyle 0-1, Stephen McFadden 0-1	Report	Aaron Kelly 1-2 (1'45), Seán Martin 0-4 (1tp), Oisín Gallen 0-4 (1tpf, 2f), Chad McSorley 0-3, Fionn McGinty 0-1, Shaun McMenamin 0-1	O'Donnell Park, Letterkenny; Referee: Martin McCormick (Glenfin)

26 September 2026; 20:00 IST (UTC+1); Quarter-final	An Clochán Liath	0-18 (18) – (21) 1-18	St Eunan's	MacCumhaill Park, Ballybofey; Referee: Mark Dorrian (Gaeil Fhánada)
26 September 2026; 20:00 IST (UTC+1); Quarter-final	Danny McCready 0-5 (2tp), Luke Clerkin 0-4 (1f, 1tpf), Ryan Connor 0-2 (1f), Barry Curran 0-2 (tp), Aaron Neely 0-2, Christopher O'Donnell 0-1, Oisín Bonner 0-1, Conor O'Donnell 0-1	Report	Conor O'Donnell Jnr 0-7 (4f), Eoin McGeehin 1-1, Dillon Doogan 0-2 (tp), Oran Winston 0-2, Conor O'Donnell Snr 0-2 (tp), Shaun Patton 0-2 (tpf), Eoin Dowling 0-1, Shane O'Donnell 0-1	MacCumhaill Park, Ballybofey; Referee: Mark Dorrian (Gaeil Fhánada)

27 September 2026; 13:00 IST (UTC+1); Quarter-final	Naomh Conaill	3-13 (22) – (16) 0-16	Chill Chartha	Fr Tierney Park, Ballyshannon; Referee: Val Murray (Aodh Ruadh)
27 September 2026; 13:00 IST (UTC+1); Quarter-final	Shea Malone 2-3, John O'Malley 1-1, Brendan McDyer 0-4 (1tp, 1f), Odhran Doherty 0-3 (1tp), Finnbarr Roarty 0-1, Jeaic Mac Ceallabhuí 0-1	Report	Jack Hegarty 0-5 (1tp), Ryan McShane 0-2, Brian O'Donnell 0-2 (tp), Ciaran McGinley 0-2, Matthew McClean 0-2 (tp), Eoin McHugh 0-1, Andrew McClean 0-1, Michael Gallagher 0-1	Fr Tierney Park, Ballyshannon; Referee: Val Murray (Aodh Ruadh)

27 September 2026; 16:30 IST (UTC+1); Quarter-final	Glenswilly	1-13 (16) – (9) 0-09	St Michael's	O'Donnell Park, Letterkenny; Referee: Enda McFeely (Naomh Mhuire, Conmhaigh)
27 September 2026; 16:30 IST (UTC+1); Quarter-final	Michael Murphy 0-6 (3f, 1'45, 1tpf), Eoghan Scott 1-1, Daithí Gildea 0-2, Kealan Dunleavy 0-2 (tp), Jack Gallagher 0-1, Dylan McAteer 0-1	Report	Daniel McLaughlin 0-5 (3f, 1tpf), Oisín Langan 0-1 ('45), Michael Cannon 0-1, Max Roarty 0-1, Packie Spiers 0-1	O'Donnell Park, Letterkenny; Referee: Enda McFeely (Naomh Mhuire, Conmhaigh)

== Semi-Finals ==
3 October 2026; 19:30 IST (UTC+1); Semi-final	St Eunan's	2-18 (24) – (22) 1-19	Ghaoth Dobhair	MacCumhaill Park, Ballybofey; Referee: Andrew McCallig (Naomh Ultan)
3 October 2026; 19:30 IST (UTC+1); Semi-final	Shane O'Donnell 0-5 (1tp), Conor O'Donnell Jnr 0-4 (2f), Ciarán Moore 1-1, Dylan Doogan 1-0, Eoin McGeehin 0-2, Oran Winston 0-2, Eoin Dowling 0-2 (tp), Conor O'Donnell Snr 0-1, Niall O'Donnell 0-1	Report	Daire Ó Baoill 1-2 (1pen), Eamonn Collum 0-5 (3f), Ethan Harkin 0-3, Eoin de Búrca 0-3, Domhnall Mac Giolla Bhríde 0-2, Stephen McFadden 0-2 (tp), Cathal Gillespie 0-1, Fiachra Coyle 0-1	MacCumhaill Park, Ballybofey; Referee: Andrew McCallig (Naomh Ultan)

4 October 2026; 16:00 IST (UTC+1); Semi-final	Naomh Conaill	0-22 (22) – (19) 0-19 (a.e.t.)	Glenswilly	MacCumhaill Park, Ballybofey; Referee: James Connors (St Eunan's)
4 October 2026; 16:00 IST (UTC+1); Semi-final	Shea Malone 0-8 (1tp, 1tpf, 1'45, 1f), Ciarán Thompson 0-5 (1tpf, 2f), John O'Malley 0-3, Odhran Doherty 0-3 (1tp), Kevin McGettigan 0-1, Daithí Molloy 0-1, Seamus Corcoran 0-1	Report	Michael Murphy 0-10 (3'45, 1tpf, 2f), Eoghan Scott 0-3 (1tp), Kealan Dunleavy 0-3, Caolan Kelly 0-2, Liam McGinley 0-1	MacCumhaill Park, Ballybofey; Referee: James Connors (St Eunan's)

== Final ==
18 October 2026; 15:30 IST (UTC+1); Final	St Eunan's	v	Naomh Conaill	MacCumhaill Park, Ballybofey; Referee: Cathal Boland (Ard an Rátha)

== Relegation ==
=== Relegation playoff semi-finals ===
12 September 2026; 15:30 IST (UTC+1); Relegation playoff semi-final	Ard an Rátha	1-15 (18) – (17) 1-14	Na Cealla Beaga	Towney Park, Kilcar; Referee: Mark Dorrian (Gaeil Fhánada)
12 September 2026; 15:30 IST (UTC+1); Relegation playoff semi-final	Shane Sweeney 1-1 (pen), Karl Joseph Molloy 0-4 (1tp, 1f), Eoghan Ban McNelis 0-3 (1tpf), Josh Malley 0-2, John Ross Molloy 0-2, Cailum Malley 0-1, Lorcan O'Donnell 0-1, Kyle McHugh 0-1	Report	Hugh McFadden 0-5 (2tpf), Odhran McGuinness 0-4 (2tp), Seamus Óg Byrne 1-0, Ryan Cunningham 0-2 (1f), Evan Broderick 0-2 (tp), Christopher Mulligan 0-1	Towney Park, Kilcar; Referee: Mark Dorrian (Gaeil Fhánada)

12 September 2026; 19:30 IST (UTC+1); Relegation playoff semi-final	Glenfin	0-13 (13) – (24) 2-18	Aodh Ruadh	Pearse Memorial Park, Ardara; Referee: Cathal Gallagher (Glenswilly)
12 September 2026; 19:30 IST (UTC+1); Relegation playoff semi-final	Shaun Ward 0-7 (2tp), Jason Morrow 0-2 (tp), Seaghan McCormick 0-2, Luke McGlynn 0-2	Report	Peter Boyle 0-6 (1tp), Colm McGloin 1-1, Jack Gallagher 0-4, Darren Drummond 1-0, Nathan Boyle 0-3 (1tp), Eamon McGrath 0-2 (tp), Eoin Cassidy 0-2 (2f)	Pearse Memorial Park, Ardara; Referee: Cathal Gallagher (Glenswilly)

=== Relegation playoff final ===
27 September 2026; 13:00 IST (UTC+1); Relegation playoff final	Na Cealla Beaga	1-19 (22) – (10) 1-07	Glenfin	Pearse Memorial Park, Ardara; Referee: Cathal Boland (Ard an Rátha)
27 September 2026; 13:00 IST (UTC+1); Relegation playoff final	Hugh McFadden 1-5 (1pen, 2f), Jack McSharry 0-5 (1tp), Odhran McGuinness 0-2 (tp), Conor Cunningham 0-2 (tpf), Ryan Cunningham 0-1, Ryan Carr 0-1, Seamus Óg Byrne 0-1, Edward McHugh 0-1, Ethan Byrne 0-1	Report	Shaun Ward 0-4 (1tpf, 1f), Luke McGlynn 1-1 (1pen), Ciarán Brady 0-1, Seaghan McCormick 0-1	Pearse Memorial Park, Ardara; Referee: Cathal Boland (Ard an Rátha)
