= 2025 Donegal Senior Football Championship =

Donegal S.F.C.
- Season: 2025
- Champions: Naomh Conaill (8th title)
- Winning captain: John O'Malley
- Man of the Match: Finnbarr Roarty
- Winning manager: Martin Regan

The 2025 Donegal Senior Football Championship was the 103rd official edition of Donegal GAA's premier Gaelic football tournament for senior graded clubs in County Donegal. 16 teams competed, with the winner representing Donegal in the Ulster Senior Club Football Championship.

The defending champion from 2024 was St Eunan's. That title made St Eunan's the most successful club in Donegal. The competition began on the weekend of 8–10 August, shortly after Donegal's appearance in the 2025 All-Ireland Senior Football Championship final.

Naomh Conaill advanced to the 2025 final, where – despite not leading in any part of normal time – the club came from behind to defeat Gaoth Dobhair after extra time.

== Team changes ==
The following teams changed division since the 2024 championship season.

=== To S.F.C. ===
Promoted from 2024 Donegal I.F.C.

- Termon – (I.F.C. Champions)

=== From S.F.C. ===
Relegated to 2025 Donegal I.F.C.

- Cloich Cheann Fhaola

== Preliminary quarter-finals ==
St Eunan's opted to forego the club's right to a replay as a result of substitute Enda McCormick's illegal point, doing so in the belief that it "would cause disruption to the championship and risk undermining its integrity". The approach of St Eunan's to this injustice was described as "a touch of class" and "handled with class". The incident brought comparisons with the 2023 All-Ireland Club final when Kilmacud Crokes did a similar thing to Glen. St Eunan's players pointed out the error to officials, but to no avail.

13 September 2025; Preliminary quarter-final	Termon	1–16 — 0–18 (aet)	St Eunan's	Convoy; Referee: Marc Browne (Four Masters)
13 September 2025; Preliminary quarter-final	Ricky Gallagher 1–2; Oisin Harkin 0–3, 1f tp; Ryan McFadden and John James Sweeney 0–3, tp; Daire McDaid 0–2, 1f, 45; Aaron Reid, Patrick Fegan and Enda McCormick 0–1	Report	Eoin McGeehin 0–6, 2f; Shane O'Donnell 0–6, tp; James Kelly 0–2; Conor O'Donnell Snr 0–2, tp; Kieran Tobin 0–1; Shaun Patton 0–1, 45	Convoy; Referee: Marc Browne (Four Masters)

13 September 2025; Preliminary quarter-final	Naomh Conaill	3–15 — 2–10	Na Cealla Beaga	Pearse Memorial Park; Referee: Ryan Walsh (Réalt na Mara)
13 September 2025; Preliminary quarter-final	Shea Malone 2–0; Brendan McDyer 0–5,2f; Kevin McGettigan 1–1; Odhrán Doherty 0–3; John O'Malley 0–2,tp; Eoghan McGettigan 0–2,1f; Finnbarr Roarty and Ethan O'Donnell 0–1 each	Report	Hugh McFadden 0–5f; Jack McSharry and Rory Colyer 1–0 each; Evan Broderick 0–2,tp; Odhran McGuinness 0–2; Charlie Breslin 0–1	Pearse Memorial Park; Referee: Ryan Walsh (Réalt na Mara)

14 September 2025; 15:00; Preliminary quarter-final	Seán Mac Cumhaills	2–16 — 0–17	Na Dúnaibh	O'Donnell Park; Referee: Cathal Boland (Ard an Rátha)
14 September 2025; 15:00; Preliminary quarter-final	Conor McGinty 0–6, 1tp; Marty O'Reilly 1–1; Luke Gavigan 0–3, 1tp; Chad McSorley 1–0; Kevin McCormick 0–2; Fionn McGinty, Joe Boyle, Chad McSorley, Aaron Kelly 0–1 each	Report	Johnny McGroddy 0–6, 1tpf, 1f; Ronan Gallagher 0–2, 1tp; Allen Pasoma, Cian McBride and Danny McBride 0–2 each; Patrick McElwee, Conor Boyce and Gary McClafferty 0–1 each	O'Donnell Park; Referee: Cathal Boland (Ard an Rátha)

14 September 2025; 17:00; Preliminary quarter-final	Four Masters	2–15 — 0–18	Glenswilly	O'Donnell Park; Referee: Martin McCormick (Glenfin)
14 September 2025; 17:00; Preliminary quarter-final	Turlough Carr 1–2; Seanán Carr 0–5,2f; Conor McCahill 1–1; Kevin Muldoon 0–4, 2'45; Conor Reid 0–2; Richard O'Rourke 0–1	Report	Gary McFadden 0–6,1tp,1tpf,2f; Caoimhin Marley and Eoghan Scott 0–2,1tp each; Donal Gallagher 0–2; Kealan Dunleavy 0–2, 1'45; Oisin Crawford, Shane Tinney, Mark Bonner and Paddy Ward 0–1 each	O'Donnell Park; Referee: Martin McCormick (Glenfin)

== Quarter-finals ==
St Michael's defeated Seán Mac Cumhaills in the first quarter-final, while Gaoth Dobhair defeated Cill Chartha in the second. Four Masters defeated An Clochán Liath in the third quarter-final, while Naomh Conaill defeated Termon in the last.

20 September 2025; Quarter-final	St Michael's	0–26 — 0–15	Seán Mac Cumhaills	O'Donnell Park; Referee: James Connors (St Eunan's)
20 September 2025; Quarter-final	Michael Langan 0–10, 3 tpf; 1tp, 2f; Carlos O'Reilly 0–5, 1tp; 1f; Colin McFaddan 0–3; Michael Cannon and Max Roarty 0–2 each; Michael McGinley, Patrick O'Neill, Martin McElhinney and Edward O'Reilly 0–1 each	Report	Joe Boyle 0–6, 2tpf, 2’45; Sean Martin 0–4, 1tp; Chad McSorley 0–2; Jamie Keegan 0–2,1f; Conor McGinty 0–1,1f	O'Donnell Park; Referee: James Connors (St Eunan's)

20 September 2025; Quarter-final	Gaoth Dobhair	0–16 — 1–10	Cill Chartha	Davy Brennan Memorial Park; Referee: Enda McFeely (St Mary's, Convoy)
20 September 2025; Quarter-final	Ethan Harkin 0–8,1tp,1tpf,2f; Fionnan Coyle, Micheal Roarty (tp), Eamonn Collum 0–2 each; Domhnall Mac Giolla Bhride, Eoin de Burca 0–1 each	Report	Patrick McBrearty 1–1; Matthew McClean 0–5,2tp; Ryan McHugh 0–3; Ciaran McGinley 0–1	Davy Brennan Memorial Park; Referee: Enda McFeely (St Mary's, Convoy)

21 September 2025; Quarter-final	Four Masters	0–20 — 0–10	An Clochán Liath	Fr Tierney Park; Referee: Cathal Boland (Ard an Rátha)
21 September 2025; Quarter-final	Seanán Carr 0–5,1tpf,2f; Turlough Carr 0–3,1tp; Conor Reid, Conor McCahill (2f), Kevin Muldoon (1f) 0–2 each; Callum McCrea, Caolan Loughney, Richard O’Rourke, Oisin Reid, Alex McCalmont, Joe Leape 0–1 each	Report	Barry Curran 0–3; Danny Rodgers (tpf), Luke Clerkin (2f) 0–2 each; Karl Magee, Darren Curran, Dylan Sweeney 0–1 each	Fr Tierney Park; Referee: Cathal Boland (Ard an Rátha)

21 September 2025; Quarter-final	Naomh Conaill	2–12 — 2–11	Termon	O'Donnell Park; Referee: Mark Dorrian (Gaeil Fhánada)
21 September 2025; Quarter-final	Charlie McGuinness 1–1; Max Campbell 1–0; Shea Malone 0–3, 1tp; John O'Malley 0–2,1f; Brendan McDyer 0–2,2f; Anthony Thompson 0–2, 1tp; Kevin McGettigan, Finnbarr Roarty 0–1 each	Report	Jack Alcorn and Patrick Fagan 1–2 each; Daire MacDaid 0–5, 1tpf, 1f; Ciaran Cassidy and Cormac Gallagher 0–1 each	O'Donnell Park; Referee: Mark Dorrian (Gaeil Fhánada)

== Semi-finals ==
Gaoth Dobhair defeated St Michael's by six points in the first semi-final, played on a Saturday evening at O'Donnell Park. St Michael's lost a sixth semi-final since 2011. This result led to Gaoth Dobhair being tipped in the media as "the side to beat", with manager Ronan Mac Niallais saying: "we're Gaoth Dobhair, the second most successful side in the county ever".

Naomh Conaill overcame a three-point deficit in extra time to defeat Four Masters in the second-semi-final, played the following day at the same venue. Kevin McGettigan of Naomh Conaill scored the only goal of the game.

27 September 2025; 17:00; Semi-final	Gaoth Dobhair	1–16 — 0–13	St Michael's	O'Donnell Park; Referee: Mark Dorrian (Gaeil Fhánada)
27 September 2025; 17:00; Semi-final	Eoin De Burca 0–4,1tp; Ethan Harkin 0–3, 1tpf, 1f; Stephen McFadden 0–3; Domhnall Mac Giolla Bhríde 1–0; Micheál Roarty 0–2, 1tp; Odhrán Mac Niallais, Fionnan Coyle, Eamonn Collum and Niall Friel 0–1 each	Report	Daniel McLaughlin 0–5, 1tpf, 1f; Michael Langan 0–3, 1tp, 1'45; Colin McFadden 0–3,1tp; Edward O'Reilly 0-2,1m	O'Donnell Park; Referee: Mark Dorrian (Gaeil Fhánada)

28 September 2025; 16:00; Semi-final	Naomh Conaill	1–19 — 0–18	Four Masters	O'Donnell Park; Referee: Enda McFeely (St Mary's, Convoy)
28 September 2025; 16:00; Semi-final	Shea Malone 0–8,2tpf; Kevin McGettigan 1–0; John O'Malley 0–2f; Max Campbell and Kieran Gallagher 0–2 each; Brendan McDyer 0–2,1f; Finnbarr Roarty, Ethan O'Donnell and Anthony Thompson 0–1 each	Report	Seanán Carr 0–6,1f; Turlough Carr 0–4,1tp; Kevin Muldoon and Alex McCalmont 0–3 each; Conor McCahill 0–1f; Callum McCrea 0–1	O'Donnell Park; Referee: Enda McFeely (St Mary's, Convoy)

== Final ==
The game was shown live on TG4.

It was a fourth meeting between Naomh Conaill and Gaoth Dobhair in eight Donegal SFC deciders. Gaoth Dobhair had won the 2018 edition, while Naomh Conaill had won the 2019 and 2023 editions. Naomh Conaill returned to the final after an absence of one year, having made seven consecutive appearances until that run was ended by St Eunan's in the 2024 quarter-final.

=== Summary ===
Naomh Conaill began badly and – in the 16th minute – Anthony Thompson conceded a penalty, which Gaoth Dobhair's Daire Ó Baoill converted. Naomh Conaill – Seven points behind at half-time – did not lead Gaoth Dobhair in any part of normal time, in either half. Early in the second half, Kevin McGettigan scored Naomh Conaill's first goal to help reduce the deficit. As the end approached, fans of Gaoth Dobhair began celebrating victory, only for Shea Malone to score the vital two-pointer for Naomh Conaill in additional time at the end of normal time, setting up extra time. Naomh Conaill captain John O'Malley scored from a mark almost as soon as extra time began, and Gaoth Dobhair fell behind for the first time. Max Campbell then scored Naomh Conaill's second goal.

This victory gave Naomh Conaill a fifth title in seven seasons, and a third in four years. Brendan McDyer, Leo McLoone and Anthony Thompson each received an eighth winners' medal from 13 appearances in the decider. For Roarty it was a first Donegal SFC title. Declan Bonner wrote in the Donegal News that Roarty "was just simply phenomenal".

=== Details ===
12 October 2025; 15:30; Final	Naomh Conaill	2–18 — 1–19 (aet)	Gaoth Dobhair	O'Donnell Park; Referee: James Connor (St Eunan's); Man of the Match: Finnbarr Roarty
12 October 2025; 15:30; Final	Max Campbell 1–1; Kevin McGettigan 1–0; Finnbarr Roarty, Shea Malone (1 2pt), John O'Malley (2m), Brendan McDyer 0–3 each; Odhrán Doherty (2pt) 0–2; Kieran Gallagher, Charles McGuinness, Leo McLoone 0–1 each	Report	Ethan Harkin (2 2pt, 2f, 1m) 0–8; Daire Ó Baoill 1–0pen; Micheál Roarty, Stephen McFadden, Eamonn Collum, Niall Friel 0–2 each; Fionnan Coyle, Odhrán Mac Niallais, Jordi Gribben 0–1 each	O'Donnell Park; Referee: James Connor (St Eunan's); Man of the Match: Finnbarr Roarty

== Relegation ==
Originally scheduled for the weekend of 13–14 September, the relegation playoff semi-finals were postponed by a week because of poor weather, and this affected the original choice of venue for the first semi-final. Tír Conaill Park in Donegal Town had been announced for Aodh Ruadh and Glenfin. Eamonn Byrne Memorial Park in Fintra was retained for the second semi-final.

=== Relegation playoff semi-finals ===
20 September 2025; Relegation playoff semi-final	Glenfin	2–16 — 1–17 (aet)	Aodh Ruadh	Convoy; Referee: Anthony McCallig (Naomh Ultan)
20 September 2025; Relegation playoff semi-final	Karl McGlynn, Jack Long 1–0 each; Shaun Ward 0–3,1tp,1f; Luke McGlynn 0–3,1tp; Odhran O'Connor 0–4; Frank McGlynn 0–2; Jason Morrow 0–2,tp; Ciaran Brady, Aaron McGlynn 0–1	Report	Diarmaid McInerney 1–5,1-0pen,1tpf,1tp,1f; Nathan Boyle 0–4,1f,1tp; Shane McGrath 0–2,tp; Matt Gillespie 0–2; Eamonn McGrath, David Dolan (f), Jack Gallagher Damian Weber 0–1 each	Convoy; Referee: Anthony McCallig (Naomh Ultan)

21 September 2025; Relegation playoff semi-final	Ard an Rátha	2–13 — 2–9	St Naul's	Eamonn Byrne Memorial Park; Attendance: Martin McCormick (Glenfin)
21 September 2025; Relegation playoff semi-final	Kyle McHugh 1–6, 2tp; Gavin Sweeney 1–2; C J Molloy 0–3, 1tp; Conor Classon 0–1, Niall McCrossan 0–1,1f	Report	Gavin Mulreany 0–6 3tpf; Niall Prenderville, Declan Duignan 1–0 each, Joe Campbell, Thomas White and Michael Coughlan 0–1 each	Eamonn Byrne Memorial Park; Attendance: Martin McCormick (Glenfin)

=== Relegation playoff final ===
27 September 2025; Relegation playoff final	Aodh Ruadh	2–17 — 1–8	St Naul's	Tír Conaill Park; Referee: Pat Barrett (Milford)
27 September 2025; Relegation playoff final	Diarmaid McInerney 0–5,2f; Shane Delahunty 0–3; Matt Gillespie 0–3; David Dolan 1–0; Damien Weber 1–0; Peter Boyle 0–3,1tpf; Shane McGrath 0–1, Eoghan Kelly 0–2	Report	Peadar Mogan 0–4, 2f; Michael Coughlan 1–0; Stephen Griffin 0–2,1f; Barry Burke 0–2	Tír Conaill Park; Referee: Pat Barrett (Milford)

== Statistics ==
=== Top scorers ===
- Ethan Harkin (Gaoth Dobhair) 0–42
- Johnny McGroddy (Na Dúnaibh) 1–31
- CJ Molloy (Ard an Rátha) 4–19

== Awards ==
The Donegal News published a "Team of the Senior Championship", which included Michael Langan, Daniel McLaughlin and Finnbarr Roarty. The Donegal Democrat also published a "Team of the Senior Championship", which included Kevin McGettigan, Gavin Mulreany, Daire Ó Baoill, as well as Langan and Roarty.
