= 2025 Donegal county football team season =

Donegal county football team
2025 season
- Manager: Jim McGuinness
- Stadium: MacCumhaill Park, Ballybofey
- NFL D1: 4th
- All-Ireland SFC: Finalist
- Ulster SFC: Winners

The following is a summary of Donegal county football team's 2025 season.

== Personnel changes ==
On 6 November 2024, it was announced that Michael Murphy would come out of retirement and again represent the county for the 2025 season, under the manager that he captained them to the All Ireland. This followed "weeks of rumours" and numerous reports on the day of the announcement that it was happening. Brian McEniff addressed the rumours for his newspaper column on 23 October 2024. Anthony Molloy mentioned hearing the rumours and said: "look at the season Paul Conroy had in winning Footballer of the Year at the age of 35 and playing midfield in an All-Ireland final, maybe Michael saw that and thought there were a few years left in him". Molloy also mentioned how his own return from taking some time away after 1990 until 1992 led to him captaining Donegal to the All Ireland for the first time. Murphy had ruled out returning ahead of the 2024 season. What it meant as well was Murphy gave up his punditry role with the BBC and his position on the Football Review Committee. Thomas Niblock, who worked with him on the BBC, reported on Murphy's return. The Irish Times reported that Murphy's decision coincided with James McCarthy picking the same week to retire from playing for Dublin and "In terms of stop-you-in-your-tracks GAA comebacks, this is up there with Stephen Cluxton with Dublin and Graham Geraghty with Meath". There was further excitement when it was later widely reported that Murphy, a full-forward, was training as a goalkeeper and, although this was thought to be an attempt by manager Jim McGuinness to get round the new playing rules introduced by Jim Gavin, ultimately it ended up being part of the care taken to ease Murphy back into the inter-county scene.

Four other players made "returns" for different reasons. Eoin McHugh had been with Donegal at various times since playing in the 2013 Dr McKenna Cup. The other three, in order of their time with Donegal, were Odhran McFadden Ferry (serving as a soldier overseas, double ACL injury, travel to Australia because of a career break due to his injuries), Eoghan McGettigan (also long troubled by injuries) and Finnbarr Roarty (Donegal tried to play him as early as January 2024 but the GAA banned him for being 17).

== Competitions ==
Donegal became the first team to play 11 championship matches in the same season.

=== National Football League Division 1 ===
Eoghan Bán Gallagher tore his hamstring while training for the last NFL game against Mayo, he would miss the entirety of the Ulster SFC campaign and only return for the All-Ireland SFC.

=== Fixtures ===
Donegal's fixtures for the 2025 NFL were announced in November 2024, with the Round Six fixture against Tyrone originally set for the evening of 15 March at MacCumhaill Park. It was later changed to the afternoon of 16 March at O'Donnell Park. Donegal's Round 1 trip to Kerry was one of several league fixtures postponed because of Storm Éowyn.

1 February 2025 Round 1	Donegal	0–20 (20) – (16) 0–16	Dublin	Ballybofey
				Stadium: MacCumhaill Park

8 February 2025 Round 2	Kerry	1–18 (21) – (23) 0–23	Donegal	Killarney
				Stadium: Fitzgerald Stadium

16 February 2025 Round 3	Donegal	v	Armagh	Ballybofey
15:00				Stadium: MacCumhaill Park

23 February 2025 Round 4	Galway	v	Donegal	Tuam
15:45				Stadium: St Jarlath's Park
Note: TG4

2 March 2025 Round 5	Donegal	v	Derry	Ballyshannon
13:45				Stadium: Fr Tierney Park

16 March 2025 Round 6	Donegal	v	Tyrone	Letterkenny
15:30				Stadium: O'Donnell Park

23 March 2025 Round 7	Mayo	v	Donegal	Castlebar
13:45				Stadium: MacHale Park

==== Table ====
Pos	Team	Pld	W	D	L	PF	PA	PD	Pts	Qualification
1	Mayo	7	4	1	2	133	134	−1	9	Advance to NFL Final
2	Kerry (Note: Ranked by score difference)	7	4	0	3	170	151	+19	8	Advance to NFL Final
3	Galway	7	3	2	2	143	134	+9	8	
4	Donegal	7	4	0	3	141	139	+2	8	
5	Dublin	7	4	0	3	143	142	+1	8	
6	Armagh (Note: Armagh are ranked ahead of Tyrone as they won the head-to-head game between the teams.)	7	3	1	3	144	137	+7	7	
7	Tyrone	7	3	1	3	138	131	+7	7	Relegation to 2026 NFL Division 2
8	Derry	7	0	1	6	136	180	−44	1	Relegation to 2026 NFL Division 2

Source: GAA.ie
Rules for classification: Tiebreakers

=== Ulster Senior Football Championship ===
Jason McGee made his season debut as a substitute against Derry in the preliminary round.

==== Fixtures ====
The draw for the 2025 Ulster Championship took place in October 2024.

6 April 2025
2.00pm
Preliminary round

Report

Donegal	1–25 – 1–15	Derry
Gls: D. Ó Baoill; Pts: D. Ó Baoill 4 (2 tp), P. McBrearty 7 (3 fs); P. Mogan, C. O’Donnell, S. O’Donnell C. Moore, M. Murphy (1f) 2 each; F. Roarty, R. McHugh, J. Brennan, O. Gallen, 1 each.		Gls: B. Rogers 5 (2 tp), S. McGuigan 4fs, L. Murray 2 (1f), C. Doherty 2 (1tp); P. McGrogan, N. Toner 1 each. Pts: D. Higgins 1

MacCumhaill Park, Ballybofey
Referee: Brendan Cawley (Kildare)
Attendance: 15,023

20 April 2025
Quarter-final

Report

Monaghan	0–21 – 0–23	Donegal

St Tiernach's Park, Clones
Attendance: 16,120

BBC

27 April 2025
15:00
Semi-final

Report

Down	0–16 – 1–19	Donegal

St Tiernach’s Park, Clones
Attendance: 9,221

10 May 2025
17:25
Final

Report

Armagh	0–28 – 2–23	Donegal

St Tiernach's Park, Clones
Referee: Brendan Cawley (Kildare)
Attendance: 28,788

==== Bracket ====
Preliminary round

Quarter-finals

Semi-finals

Final

Antrim
1-23

Armagh
1-34

Armagh
0-23

Tyrone
0-22

Tyrone
1-24

Cavan
0-20

Armagh
0-28

Donegal
2-23 (a.e.t.)

Fermanagh
0-23

Down
2-19

Down
0-16

Donegal
1-25

Donegal
1-19

Derry
1-15

Monaghan
0-21

Donegal
0-23

== Awards ==
=== GAA.ie Football Team of the Week ===
- 4 February: Ó Baoill (nominated for Footballer of the Week)
- 10 February: Eoghan Bán Gallagher, Brendan McCole; Ryan McHugh, Shane O'Donnell, Conor O'Donnell; Ryan McHugh, nominated for, and selected as, Footballer of the Week
- 17 February: Patrick McBrearty (nominated for, and selected as, Footballer of the Week)
- 3 March: Ó Baoill, Ciarán Thompson; Thompson nominated for Footballer of the Week
- 7 April: Shaun Patton, Ciarán Moore, Ó Baoill, Patrick McBrearty; Ó Baoill nominated for, and selected as, Footballer of the Week
- 22 April: Shaun Patton, Finnbarr Roarty, Mogan, Michael Langan, Ciarán Thompson; Mogan nominated for, and selected as, Footballer of the Week
- 28 April: Shaun Patton, Ó Baoill, Michael Langan
- 12 May: Mogan, Ciarán Moore, Ciarán Thompson, Michael Murphy, Oisín Gallen; Murphy nominated for Footballer of the Week
- 26 May: Brendan McCole, Michael Langan, Michael Murphy
- 3 June: Ciarán Moore, Conor O'Donnell
- 16 June: Michael Murphy (nominated for Footballer of the Week)
- 23 June: Brendan McCole, Finnbarr Roarty, Oisín Gallen
- 30 June: Mogan, Michael Langan, Shane O'Donnell; O'Donnell nominated for Footballer of the Week
- 14 July: Brendan McCole, Finnbarr Roarty, Eoghan Bán Gallagher, Michael Langan, Ciarán Moore, Conor O'Donnell, Gallen; O'Donnell nominated for Footballer of the Week

=== The Sunday Game Team of the Year ===
The Sunday Game selected Brendan McCole, Michael Langan, Michael Murphy and Conor O'Donnell on its Team of the Year.

=== Footballer of the Year ===
Michael Murphy was nominated.

=== GAA/GPA Young Footballer of the Year ===
Finnbarr Roarty won.

=== All Stars ===
Donegal achieved four All Stars.

This was after receiving more nominations than All-Ireland SFC winner Kerry.

Pos.	Player	Team	Appearances
GK	Shane Ryan	Kerry	2
RCB	Brendan McCole	Donegal	1
FB	Jason Foley	Kerry	2
LCB	Seán Rafferty	Meath	1
RWB	Brian Ó Beaglaoich	Kerry	1
CB	Gavin White	Kerry	2
LWB	Finnbarr Roarty	Donegal	1
MD	Joe O'Connor	Kerry	1
MD	Michael Langan	Donegal	1
RWF	Paudie Clifford	Kerry	4
CF	Seán O'Shea	Kerry	4
LWF	Oisín Conaty	Armagh	2
RCF	David Clifford^{FOTY}	Kerry	6
FF	Michael Murphy	Donegal	4
LCF	Sam Mulroy	Louth	1

County breakdown

- Kerry = 8
- Donegal = 4
- Meath = 1
- Louth = 1
- Armagh = 1
