= CLG Naomh Columba =

Donegal-based Gaelic games club

Naomh Columba
- CLG Naomh Columba
- Founded: 1964
- County: Donegal
- Nickname: Glen, Gleann
- Colours: Gold and Green
- Grounds: Páirc na nGael
- Coordinates: 54°57′08.48″N 8°21′07.55″W

Playing kits
Standard colours

Senior Club Championships
	All Ireland	Ulster champions	Donegal champions
Football:	-	-	2

CLG Naomh Columba is a Gaelic football-only GAA club based in Gleann Cholm Cille in the south-west of County Donegal in the west of Ulster, the northern province in Ireland. The club fields both men's and ladies' teams from underage as far as senior level. They enjoy an intense rivalry with their neighbours, Cill Chartha (Kilcar), with the sides reigniting their rivalry in a closely fought encounter in the 2026 Donegal Senior Football Championship.

== History ==
Naomh Columba, in their current existence were founded in 1964, although football was played in the parish for decades before this and a Junior club existed since 1944. They have won the Donegal Senior Football Championship twice, in 1978 and 1990.

Michael Oliver McIntyre captained the team to the 1978 title.

The club also won the Donegal Junior Football Championship in 1974. The club has won 2 Comórtas Peile na Gaeltachta titles and 7 Division 1 League titles. The club's most successful season came in 1978, when they claimed the championship, league and Comórtas Peile na Gaeltachta treble, as well as the county under-21 title. They remain the only Donegal club to complete this treble, although Gaoth Dobhair won a league, championship and Ulster championship treble in 2018.

Naomh Columba were once one of the most feared and respected teams in Donegal, reaching 6 senior county finals in 9 years between 1990 and 1998, but since their relegation to the Intermediate Championship and Division 3 of the league in 2007, the senior team have struggled to make any great impact on the Donegal club scene. 2024 saw the club's return to Division 1 of the Donegal league, and the return of the Naomh Columba-Cill Chartha derby.

They defeated Na Cealla Beaga in the 1990 Donegal SFC final. Among the winning players were Noel Hegarty and two uncles of Dessie Farrell, Noel Carr and Séamus Carr. Indeed, Séamus Carr at half-forward was man of the match in the final, scoring five points (each one from play), while John Joe Doherty was captain. 1978 captain McIntyre (by then a team mentor alongside Paddy "Beag" Gillespie and Seán Burke) played at full-forward in the 1990 final, which Hegarty won a with a last minute free. However, the club lost the 1992 final to the same team.

In recent years, Naomh Columba have contested three Donegal Intermediate Football Championship finals, having lost to An Clochán Liath in 2022, and to An Tearmann in 2024. In 2025, the club finally prevailed, defeating Malin in the final to promote the club back to senior football for the 2026 season, the first time the club has played at that level in almost two decades.

The Donegal county team which won the 1992 All-Ireland Senior Football Championship had two Naomh Columba players on the panel — Noel Hegarty and John Joe Doherty. John Joe Doherty was selected as an All Star in 1993. In recent years, Aaron Doherty has played for the county team at senior level, having scored the winning penalty to defeat Armagh in the 2024 Ulster Championship final. In 2026, Paul O'Hare joined the county panel, and made appearances in both the McKenna Cup and National League.

The club fields ladies' teams at both adult and underage levels. The ladies' senior team have had much success in recent years, winning the Donegal Junior Championship in 2025 as well as the Junior Comórtas Peile na Gaeltachta title at national level. They went one better in 2026, winning the Donegal Intermediate Championship and Comórtas Peile na Gaeltachta at Intermediate level. This success means that Naomh Columba will compete at senior level in both men's and ladies' football in 2027, as well as in Divison 1 of both the men's and ladies' leagues.

== Notable players ==
- Aaron Doherty — 2019 Ulster SFC winning panelist; 2022 Ulster SFC playing finalist; 2024 Ulster SFC winner
- John Joe Doherty — 1992 All-Ireland SFC winner
- Noel Hegarty — 1992 All-Ireland SFC winner
- Finian Ward — 1974 Ulster SFC and two-time Railway Cup winner
- Pádraig Carr – 1983 Ulster title winner with Donegal
- Paddy Hegarty – brother of Noel; 1987 All Ireland U-21 Championship winner and county senior player in the 1990s
- Noel McGinley – 1998 Ulster SFC finalist
- Michael Oliver McIntyre

== Managers ==
Years	Manager
1964–c. 1990?	—N/a
1990	Michael McNelis
c. 1990–2008?	—N/a
?	John Joe Doherty
2008–2009	Noel Hegarty
2010–2011	Anthony Molloy
2012	Paddy J. McGinley
2013	Brendan Doherty
2014	Paddy J. McGinley
2015–2016	Brendan Doherty
2017–2018	Paddy J. McGinley
2019–2021	Pauric O'Donnell
2022-2023	Paddy J. McGinley
2024-2026	Brendan Doherty

== Honours ==
Naomh Columba honours
Honour	No.	Years
Donegal Senior Football Championship	2	1978, 1990
Comórtas Peile na Gaeltachta	2	1978, 1986
Donegal Senior League	7	1976, 1978, 1980, 1985, 1988, 1990, 1995
Donegal Intermediate Football Championship	1	2025
Donegal Junior Football Championship	1	1974
Donegal Under-21 Football Championship	2	1978, 1987
Donegal Minor Football Championship	2	1975, 1986
