= Eunan Doherty =

Donegal Gaelic footballer

Sport
- Sport: Gaelic football
Club
- Years: Club
- 201?–: Naomh Conaill
Club titles
- Donegal titles: 5
Inter-county
- Years: County
- 2015–: Donegal

Eunan Doherty is an Irish Gaelic footballer who plays for Naomh Conaill and the Donegal county team.

Doherty has won five Donegal Senior Football Championship titles and played for his county over many years, under several different managers.

== Playing career ==
=== Club ===
Doherty has scored important goals for his club in the past.

Doherty won a Donegal Senior Football Championship (SFC) in 2015, starting the final for his club.

He helped his club to its third consecutive Donegal Senior Football Championship final in 2019. His club won that title, after a three-game final in which he scored 0–2 in the second game, but was held scoreless in the low-scoring first and third games. Naomh Conaill retained the title in 2020, with Doherty playing in the final, which was delayed until August 2021 due to the impact of the COVID-19 pandemic on Gaelic games.

Doherty also won the 2022 Donegal Senior Football Championship, playing in the final, a one-point win. He then won the 2023 Donegal Senior Football Championship, scoring 0–1 in the final against Gaoth Dobhair.

=== Inter-county ===
First featuring for his county as a player at senior level under the management of Rory Gallagher, Doherty was added to the senior panel in 2014, ahead of the 2015 Dr McKenna Cup.

Doherty made what was both his inter-county debut, and also his first start, in Gallagher's first match in charge of the county, a 2015 Dr McKenna Cup away defeat to Derry. He continued to play in other games that year.

Still involved with his county under Gallagher's successor as manager Declan Bonner, Doherty played against Tyrone in the 2021 National Football League.

He also played in the 2021 National Football League semi-final against Dublin.

He played in the 2022 Dr McKenna Cup final.

Doherty played against Mayo in Donegal's first fixture of the 2022 National Football League. He also played in the league fixture against Monaghan, a game noted for the loss which ended his team's winning run at MacCumhaill Park in Ballybofey that had been active since 2010. He featured in the matchday programme for the fixture against Kerry.

== Personal life ==
Doherty is based in Limerick.

== Honours ==
Naomh Conaill

- Donegal Senior Football Championship: 2015, 2019 2020, 2022, 2023
