= Eoghan McGettigan =

Donegal Gaelic footballer (born 1997/98)

Personal information
- Born: 1997/8

Sport
- Sport: Gaelic football
Club
- Years: Club
- 201?–: Naomh Conaill
Inter-county
- Years: County
- 2019–: Donegal

Eoghan McGettigan (born 1997/8) is an Irish Gaelic footballer who plays for Naomh Conaill and the Donegal county team.

== Playing career ==
=== Club ===
McGettigan won a Donegal Senior Football Championship (SFC) with his club in 2015, appearing as a substitute in the final, when he was 17 years of age.

He won a second Donegal SFC with his club in 2019, after a three-game final in which he scored 0–4 (from four frees) in the first game, 0–2 (from two frees) in the second game but was held scoreless in the low-scoring third game. With six points, he was his club's leading scorer in the 2019 Ulster Senior Club Football Championship semi-final victory against Clontibret. His club retained the Donegal SFC title in 2020.

However, McGettigan was injured during training ahead of the 2020 Donegal SFC final, so could not play for his club in that game, which did not occur until August 2021 due to the impact of the COVID-19 pandemic on Gaelic games.

McGettigan has been troubled by an anterior cruciate ligament injury, recovering in the early part of 2023, but then unable to play again due to injury later that year.

McGettigan played for his club in the 2025 Donegal SFC, when his club won the final again, with McGettigan making a substitute appearance in that game. He had earlier been troubled by injury.

He is a nephew of Kevin McGettigan, who he is three years younger than, and they have played together for Naomh Conaill.

=== Inter-county ===
McGettigan was part of the team that reached the 2016 All-Ireland Minor Football Championship semi-final.

Declan Bonner called him and Aaron Doherty into the Donegal panel ahead of the 2019 All-Ireland Senior Football Championship following the departures of players such as Martin McElhinney and Martin O'Reilly. According to Highland Radio, McGettigan had begun training with Donegal over April 2019. McGettigan began training with the panel shortly before Doherty did.

McGettigan came on as a substitute for Michael Langan in the 2019 All-Ireland quarter-final against Mayo.

Post-COVID disruption, McGettigan was injured and was unable to play in the remaining league games against Tyrone and Kerry in October 2020.

He scored a goal in the 2021 National Football League semi-final against Dublin.

Due to the injury he sustained in training ahead of the 2020 Donegal SFC final (played in 2021), McGettigan was ruled out of playing for Donegal in the 2021 Ulster Senior Football Championship.
