= Donegal Intermediate Ladies Football Championship =

Annual LGFA competition in County Donegal

- Irish: Craobh Peile na mBan Idirmheánach Co. Dhún na nGall
- Founded: 1995
- Title holders: Naomh Columba (1st title)
- Most titles: Aodh Ruadh (3 titles)
- Sponsors: O'Reilly Sports

The Donegal Intermediate Ladies Football Championship is an annual LGFA competition organised by Donegal LGFA among the intermediate ladies football clubs in County Donegal.

The winner qualifies to represent the county in the Ulster Intermediate Club Ladies Football Championship, the winner of which progresses to the All-Ireland Intermediate Ladies Club Football Championship. The winning team receives the intermediate championship trophy. As of 2025, this trophy was unnamed.

Naomh Columba are the 2026 champions. Aodh Ruadh are the most successful club, with three titles.

== Winners and finalists ==
=== Results by team ===
Results by team
#	Team	Wins	Years won	Last final lost
1	Aodh Ruadh	3	2005, 2010, 2022	2013
2	St Naul's	2	2017, 2020	—N/a
2	Ardara	2	2012, 2015	2025
2	Four Masters	2	1998, 2014	1996
2	St Michael's	2	1996, 2008	2007
2	Urris	2	1995, 2000	2004
3	Naomh Columba	1	2026	—N/a
3	Gaeil Fhánada	1	2025	—N/a
3	Dungloe	1	2024	—N/a
3	Naomh Mhuire	1	2021	2020
3	St Eunan's	1	2021	2020
3	Buncrana	1	2019	—N/a
3	Naomh Conaill	1	2018	—N/a
3	Carndonagh	1	2016	—N/a
3	Milford	1	2013	—N/a
3	Convoy	1	2011	—N/a
3	MacCumhaill's	1	2009	—N/a
3	Glenswilly	1	2007	—N/a
3	Termon	1	2006	—N/a
3	Glenfin	1	2004	—N/a
3	Malin	1	2001	2010

=== Finals listed by year ===
Year	Winner	Score	Opponent	Score
2026	Naomh Columba	5-15	Killybegs	2-11
2025	Gaeil Fhánada	1-9	Ardara	1-6
2024	Dungloe	1-8	Ardara	0-9
2023	Naomh Mhuire	0-10	Killybegs	0-7
2022	Aodh Ruadh	6-11	Ardara	1-6
2021	St Eunan's	3-10	Gaeil Fhánada	1-9
2020	St Naul's	1-16	St Eunan's	2-9
2019	Buncrana	2-11	St Eunan's	1-6
2018	Naomh Conaill	4-9	Buncrana	1-7
2017	St Naul's	4-13	St Eunan's	1-8
2016	Carndonagh	0-14	Buncrana	2-7
2015	Ardara	3-11	Gaoth Dobhair	1-3
2014	Four Masters			
2013	Milford	3-9	Aodh Ruadh	4-4
2012	Ardara	2-13	Cloich Cheann Fhaola	2-6
2011	Convoy	2-4	Ardara	0-5
2010	Aodh Ruadh	2-15	Malin	2-5
2009	MacCumhaill's	6-5	Aodh Ruadh	5-6
2008	St Michael's			
2007	Glenswilly		St Michael's	
2006	Termon	2-10	St Michael's	1-1
2005	Aodh Ruadh	3-13	Kilcar	0-4
2004	Glenfin	4-22	Urris	1-2
2003 (Note: Glenfin played Moville in one of the semi-finals, but unable to uncover further information.)				
2002				
2001	Malin		Kilcar	
2000	Urris	3-14	Cloich Cheann Fhaola	2-2
1999				
1998	Four Masters			
1997				
1996	St Michael's	5-9	Four Masters	2-8
1995	Urris		Four Masters	
