= Donegal Junior Ladies Football Championship =

- Irish: Craobh Peile na mBan Sóisear Co. Dhún na nGall
- Founded: 1994
- Title holders: Naomh Padraig Uisce Chaoin (1st title)
- Most titles: Gaoth Dobhair, St Naul's, MacCumhaill's and Naomh Columba. (2 titles)
- Sponsors: O'Reilly's Sportswear

The Donegal Junior Ladies Football Championship is an annual LGFA competition organised by Donegal LGFA among the third tier ladies football clubs in County Donegal, Ireland.

The winner qualifies to represent the county in the Ulster Junior Club Ladies Football Championship, the winner of which progresses to the All-Ireland Junior Ladies Club Football Championship. The winning team receives the Junior Championship trophy, as of October 2026 this was unnamed.

Naomh Padraig Uisce Chaoin are the 2026 champions. Gaoth Dobhair, St Naul's, MacCumhaill's and Naomh Columba are the most successful clubs, with two titles apiece.

== Winners and finalists ==
=== Results by team ===
Results by team
#	Team	Wins	Years won	Last final lost
1	St Naul's	2	1996, 2016	2012
1	MacCumhaill's	2	1999, 2007	2026
1	Gaoth Dobhair	2	2013, 2022	—N/a
1	Naomh Columba	2	2025	2019
2	Naomh Padraig Uisce Chaoin	1	2026	2023
2	Na Dúnaibh	1	2024	2012
2	Dungloe	1	2023	2012
2	Robert Emmet's	1	2021	2016
2	Killybegs	1	2019	—N/a
2	Naomh Muire	1	2019	2018
2	Gaeil Fhánada	1	2018	—N/a
2	Naomh Conaill	1	2017	2015
2	Buncrana	1	2015	2014
2	Carndonagh	1	2014	—N/a
2	Cloich Cheann Fhaola	1	2011	—N/a
2	Milford	1	2012	—N/a
2	Convoy	1	2010	—N/a
2	Malin	1	2009	—N/a
2	Glenswilly	1	2006	—N/a
2	St Michael's	1	2005	—N/a
2	Termon	1	2003	—N/a
2	Moville	1	2000	—N/a
2	Four Masters	1	1998	—N/a
2	Glenfin	1	1997	—N/a
2	St Eunan's	1	1994	—N/a

=== Finals listed by year ===
Year	Winner	Score	Opponent	Score
2026	Naomh Padraig Uisce Chaoin	4-14	MacCumhaill's	0-11
2025 (Note: After extra time.)	Naomh Columba	3-13	Urris	2-15
2024	Na Dúnaibh	6-12	Naomh Padraig Uisce Chaoin	0-9
2023	Dungloe	1-11	Na Dúnaibh	0-5
2022	Gaoth Dobhair	2-10	Dungloe	2-7
2021	Robert Emmet's	4-9	Dungloe	0-10
2020	Killybegs	4-10	Na Dunaibh	1-12
2019	Naomh Muire	4-07	Naomh Columba	1-09
2018	Gaeil Fhánada	5-09	Naomh Muire	3-07
2017	Naomh Conaill	6-09	Naomh Muire	2-08
2016	St Naul's		Robert Emmet's	
2015	Buncrana	1-10	Naomh Conaill	2-06
2014	Carndonagh	4-17	Buncrana	3-05
2013	Gaoth Dobhair	5-15	Naomh Conaill	0-10
2012	Milford	7-08	St Naul's	3-08
2011 (Note: Cloich Cheann Fhaola win following a replay. The Cloich Cheann Fhaola notes in Donegal News issue 9 September 2011 page 68 confirm the win and the scorers (Róisín Ní Chuireáin 0-11, Áine Coll 0-1 and Carol Anne Collum 0-1), however no corresponding score for Kilcar has been recorded.)	Cloich Cheann Fhaola	1-06 / 0-13	Naomh Conaill	1-06 / unknown
2010	Convoy	2-08	St Naul's	1-04
2009	Malin	3-10	Robert Emmet's	0-02
2008	Naomh Columba			
2007	MacCumhaill's			
2006	Glenswilly	3-11	Naomh Columba	1-05
2005	St Michael's	2-12	Naomh Columba	3-08
2004				
2003	Termon An Tearmann		Kilcar	
2002				
2001 (Note: Unable to establish if replay was ever played. It was still unplayed going into October 2001 despite the first final being played on Sunday 9 September 2001.)	St Eunan's B	4-06	Glenfin	4-06
2000	Moville		Kilcar	
1999	MacCumhaill's		Malin	
1998	Four Masters	5-17	Carndonagh	6-02
1997	Glenfin	4-09	Urris	2-12
1996	St Naul's		Kilcar	
1995	Carndonagh v St Eunan's B			
1994	St Eunan's B	2-06	Downings	1-03
