= Jeaic Mac Ceallabhuí =

Donegal Gaelic footballer (born 1998/99)

Personal information
- Born: 1998/9

Sport
- Sport: Gaelic football
- Position: Utility
Club
- Years: Club
- 201?–: Naomh Conaill
Club titles
- Donegal titles: 4
College
- Years: College
- UCD
Inter-county
- Years: County
- 20??–: Donegal
- Ulster titles: 1

Jeaic Mac Ceallabhuí (born 1998/9) is an Irish Gaelic footballer who plays for Naomh Conaill and the Donegal county team. He is a utility player.

== Playing career ==
=== Club ===
He won a Donegal Senior Football Championship (SFC) with his club in 2019, after a three-game final in which he scored a point in each game, including the opening score of the third game's second half. He also scored a goal in the 2019 Ulster Senior Club Football Championship final. Naomh Conaill retained the Donegal SFC title in 2020, with the final being delayed until August 2021 due to the impact of the COVID-19 pandemic on Gaelic games.

He scored a goal for his club against Gaoth Dobhair in the first half of the 2021 Donegal Senior Football Championship quarter-final. However, the club lost the final by ten points to St Eunan's. Then he won the 2022 Donegal Senior Football Championship. He also won the 2023 Donegal Senior Football Championship, scoring 0–1 in the final against Gaoth Dobhair. It was his fourth medal as winner.

=== College ===
He played Sigerson Cup football for UCD.

=== Inter-county ===
First featuring for his county at senior level under the management of Declan Bonner, Mac Ceallabhuí was called into the team ahead of the 2020 season.

He made a substitute appearance in Donegal's first fixture of the 2020 National Football League against Mayo. Another substitute appearance followed in the game against Meath. He did not feature in the next two fixtures (against Galway and Dublin, respectively); however, he made another substitute appearance in the next game, against Monaghan. Then the COVID-19 pandemic brought play to a halt. Play resumed behind closed doors on 18 October with a home game against Tyrone; Mac Ceallabhuí started that game. He also started, and completed, the last game of the campaign, away to Kerry.

He made his first championship start against Tyrone in the 2020 Ulster Senior Football Championship quarter-final. He then appeared as a substitute for the injured Stephen McMenamin after three minutes of the semi-final defeat of Armagh.

He was troubled by injury during the 2021 season.

He made a substitute appearance in Donegal's first fixture of the 2022 National Football League against Mayo, during which he scored a point. He did not feature in the next two fixtures, against Kildare and Kerry, respectively.

However, his involvement in the next fixture, against Tyrone, was crucial, as he scored a very late goal in that game. He also made a substitute appearance against Dublin in the next game, though he did not feature against Armagh in the concluding fixture.

He made a substitute appearance against Armagh in the 2022 All-Ireland Senior Football Championship. He did not feature in any of Donegal's three games in the 2023 Ulster Senior Football Championship.

He made a substitute appearance in Donegal's first fixture of the 2023 National Football League against Kerry. He started the next fixture against Tyrone, scoring a point. He did not feature in the next two games, against Monaghan and Galway. He made further substitute appearances in the last league three games of the season, against Armagh, Mayo and Roscommon, scoring a point against Roscommon.

He missed the 2023 championship games against Down and Clare because he was studying for exams. He later made a substitute appearance against Derry. However, he did not play against Monaghan, or against Tyrone.

== Personal life ==
His grandfather Josie Mac Ceallabhuí played for the same club, including against St Joseph's in the 1965 Donegal SFC final.

== Honours ==
Donegal

- Ulster Senior Football Championship: 2024
- National Football League Division 2: 2024

Naomh Conaill

- Donegal Senior Football Championship: 2019 2020, 2022, 2023
