= Marino Institute of Education =

Educational institution in Ireland

Coordinates: 53.372813°N 6.234222°W

- Institiúid Oideachais Marino
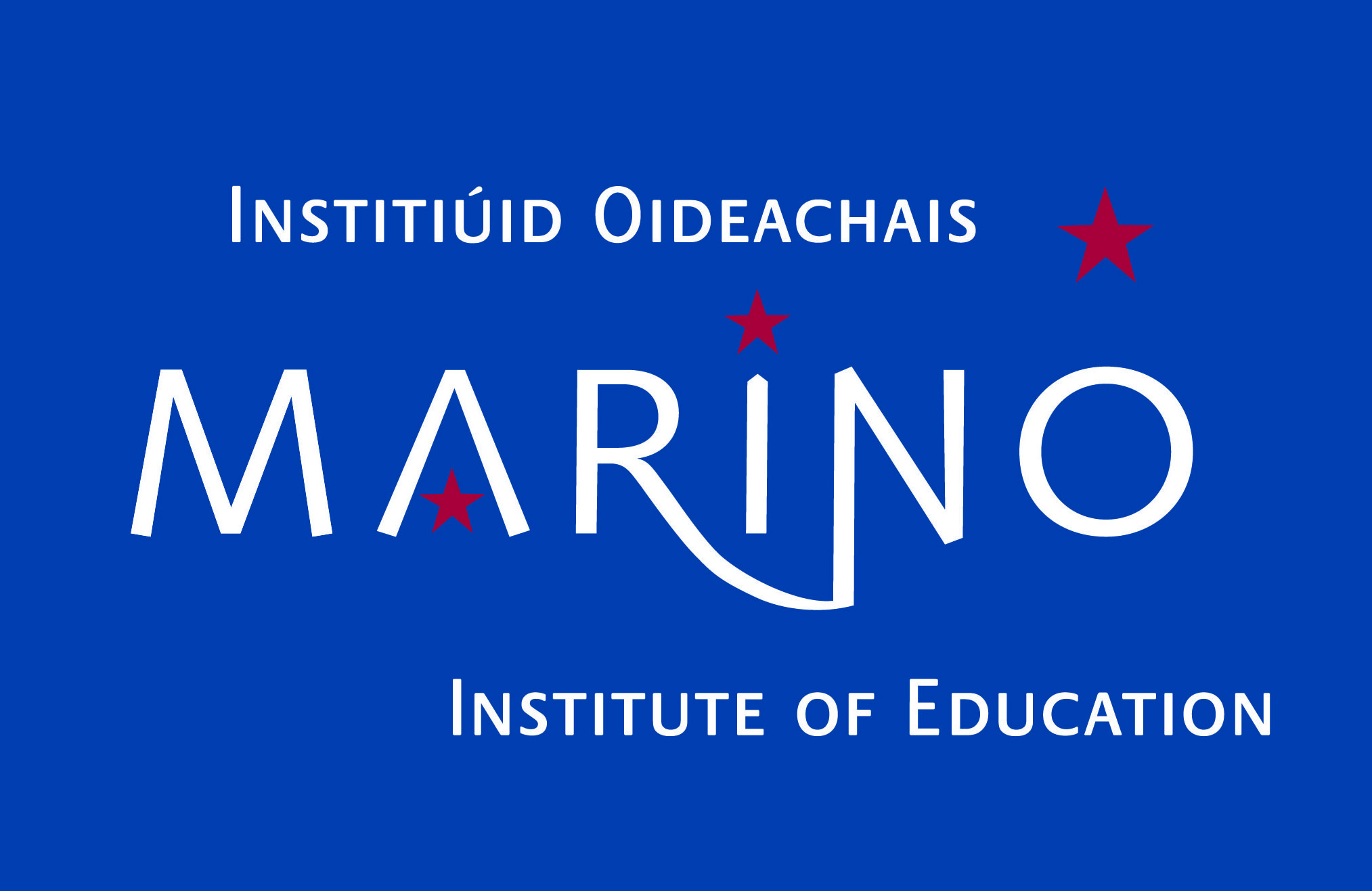
- Other names: M.I.E.
- Former names: St. Mary's College Marino; Coláiste Mhuire, Marino
- Type: Roman Catholic
- Established: 1904
- Academic affiliations: University of Dublin
- President: Teresa O'Doherty
- Students: 1,600
- Location: Griffith Avenue, Marino, Dublin, Ireland
- Co-Trustees: Congregation of Christian Brothers; University of Dublin
- Colours: Maroon and white
- Website: www.mie.ie

Marino Institute of Education (Irish: Institiúid Oideachais Marino), abbreviated as Marino Institute or MIE, is an Irish College of Education, an associated College of Trinity College Dublin. It is located on Griffith Avenue, Dublin 9. Its degrees and diplomas are awarded by the University of Dublin, Trinity College. Marino Institute of Education comprises the College of Education, the Conference Centre, Continuing Professional Development (CPD) and various support services.

== History ==
In 1831, the residence of the Superior General of the Irish Christian Brothers and the centre of teacher training was moved to North Richmond Street (O’Connell Schools) Dublin from Our Lady's Mount (North Monastery) in Cork. In 1874, the residence of the Superior General of the Irish Christian Brothers was transferred to Belvedere House in Drumcondra now the President's House in St Patrick's College of Education. In 1881, the Congregation moved to Marino House, on the original Lord Charlemont demesne. In 1900, the foundation stone was laid for a new Generalate, called St Mary's, and this is still the main building on the college campus today. St Mary's building was completed, and opened, in 1905.

The college trained Christian Brothers who taught throughout the world, on all five continents. In 1926, the Congregation became involved in the Irish National School system, and consequentially the college's focus on primary education increased.

In 1929, the Department of Education recognised the college as a teacher training college and students were awarded a National Teachers' Diploma (NT) on completion of their course.

In 1971, Brothers of other orders such as the De La Salle, and Marist Brothers, began to attend the college. From 1972, lay students were admitted to Marino Institute of Education. The B.Ed qualification gained from Marino Institute of Education was validated by Trinity College Dublin.

In 2006, Dr. Anne O'Gara was appointed President of Marino Institute of Education.

2012 saw Trinity College Dublin join the Christian Brothers in Co-Trusteeship of Marino Institute of Education.

In May 2018, Dr. Teresa O'Doherty was appointed President

== Other activities ==
Marino Institute of Education provides a Study Abroad Programme with Iona College New York.

== Notable alumni ==
- John Allen (born 1955) - hurler and Gaelic footballer
- Gerry Breen (born 1957) - Fine Gael politician
- Sinéad Burke (born 1990) - writer, academic and disability activist
- Tadhg Morley (born 1993) - All-Ireland winner with Kerry
- Marty O'Reilly (born 1993) - hurler and Gaelic footballer
- Aodhán Ó Ríordáin (born 1976) - Labour Party politician
- Róisín Shortall (born 1954) - Social Democrats politician
