= Charles McGuinness (Gaelic footballer) =

Donegal Gaelic footballer

Personal information
- Nickname: Charlie
- Born: 18 October 1996 (age 30)
- Height: 6 ft 3 in (191 cm)

Sport
- Sport: Gaelic football
- Position: Full-forward
Club
- Years: Club
- 2015–: Naomh Conaill
Club titles
- Donegal titles: 5
Inter-county
- Years: County
- 2022–: Donegal

Charles "Charlie" McGuinness (born 18 October 1996) is an Irish Gaelic footballer who plays for Naomh Conaill and the Donegal county team. He plays as a full-forward.

== Early life ==
McGuinness is a nephew of Jim McGuinness. Charles is also the nephew of Charles, Jim's brother who died suddenly in 1986 when he was 16 years old.

== Playing career ==
=== Club ===
McGuinness began playing for Naomh Conaill at senior level in 2015, a year in which the club won the Donegal Senior Football Championship (SFC). After several years as a reserve he rejoined the senior team. His club won the Donegal SFC again in 2019, after a three-game final in which he scored a point in the first game, a penalty in the second game and two frees in the third game. He also scored a goal in the 2019 Ulster Senior Club Football Championship final. Naomh Conaill retained the Donegal SFC title in 2020, with McGuinness scoring a point from a free and playing a part in both goals scored by his club in the final, which was delayed until August 2021 due to the impact of the COVID-19 pandemic on Gaelic games.

McGuinness won the 2022 Donegal Senior Football Championship, scoring 1–1 in the final against St Eunan's, his goal coming in the second half, his point from a free. He was in midfield when the ball was thrown in, before taking up a position as full-forward, only to return to midfield for each of Naomh Conaill's kickouts.

McGuinness then won the 2023 Donegal Senior Football Championship, this time scoring 1–2 in the final against Gaoth Dobhair, his goal again coming in the second half (46th minute). He also played for his club in the 2025 Donegal SFC, when his club won the final again, with McGuinness scoring 0–1 in that game.

=== Inter-county ===
While still a boy, McGuinness was part of the county's backroom team for the 2012 All-Ireland Senior Football Championship, which Donegal won. He took an active role at training, taking charge of the balls and water.

First featuring for his county as a player at senior level under the management of Declan Bonner, McGuinness made his debut against Down in the 2022 Dr McKenna Cup — in that competition he played in each of the four games, including the final of the competition. He scored a point in three of the four games, including a free in the final (he did not score in the semi-final).

A leg injury to Donegal captain Michael Murphy caused Bonner to send McGuinness on as a first-half substitute against Kildare in the 2022 National Football League. McGuinness also started the league game against Monaghan, a loss which ended his team's winning run at MacCumhaill Park in Ballybofey that had been active since 2010.

== Honours ==
Donegal

- National Football League Division 2: 2024

Naomh Conaill

- Donegal Senior Football Championship: 2015, 2019 2020, 2022, 2023, 2025
