= Noel Hegarty =

Donegal Gaelic footballer

Sport
- Sport: Gaelic football
- Position: Back
Club
- Years: Club
- 19??–19??: Naomh Columba
Club titles
- Donegal titles: 1
Inter-county
- Years: County
- c. 1991–199?: Donegal
Inter-county titles
- Ulster titles: 1
- All-Irelands: 1
- All Stars: 0

Noel Hegarty is an Irish former Gaelic footballer who played for Naomh Columba and the Donegal county team.

He played as a defender. According to The Irish Times, centre back was his best position.

Hegarty made his championship debut for Donegal in 1991. He was a member of Donegal's 1992 All-Ireland Senior Football Championship winning team. He started at left corner back in the 1992 All-Ireland Final as Donegal defeated Dublin by a scoreline of 0–18 to 0–14. He and Tony Boyle were the least experienced of Donegal's men on the pitch that day.

Hegarty broke his nose in the final of the 1994–95 National Football League. He captained his county in 1996. He started Mickey Moran's first game in charge of Donegal, a league win at home to Offaly in October 2000.

With Naomh Columba, he won one Donegal Senior Football Championship title in 1990.

He is from Glencolmcille. His brother Paddy also played for Donegal.

He has been player–manager with his native club. He has also worked with the club's underage teams.
