= Noel McGinley =

Irish Gaelic footballer

Sport
- Sport: Gaelic football
- Position: Back
Club
- Years: Club
- 19??–?: Naomh Columba
Inter-county
- Years: County
- 199?–200?: Donegal

Noel McGinley is an Irish former Gaelic footballer who played for Naomh Columba and the Donegal county team.

He played at the back.

McGinley played in the final of the 1998 Ulster Senior Football Championship. Late in that game, McGinley was involved in the game's crucial moment when Geoffrey McGonagle committed an apparent foul on him (which was ignored) and Joe Brolly scored the decisive goal.

He started Mickey Moran's first game in charge of Donegal, a league win at home to Offaly in October 2000.

He also played in the 2002 Ulster SFC final but never won the competition as a player. He played against Dublin in the 2002 All-Ireland Senior Football Championship quarter-final.

He started the first game of Brian McEniff's last spell as Donegal manager, a league defeat to Galway in Tuam in February 2003.

McGinley's 2003 inter-county season ended when he was banned for three months over a kicking offence incurred while playing for his club ahead of the Donegal's All-Ireland semi-final against Armagh. He had previously been troubled by a hamstring injury and manager Brian McEniff had sent him back to his club to play one half of a game so as have sufficient match practice ahead of the All-Ireland semi-final. The ban was unexpected.
