= Stephen Cassidy (Gaelic footballer) =

Irish former Gaelic footballer

Personal information
- Native name: Stíofán Ó Casaide (Irish)
- Born: Glasgow, Scotland

Sport
- Sport: Gaelic football
Club
- Years: Club
- ?–20??: Gaoth Dobhair
Club titles
- Donegal titles: 1 or 2
Inter-county
- Years: County
- 2000–200?: Donegal

Stephen Cassidy is an Irish former Gaelic footballer, born in Glasgow, Scotland, but living in Gweedore, County Donegal, from a young age.

He played his club football for Gaoth Dobhair and was on his county team.

Cassidy made his Donegal debut in October in what was Mickey Moran's first game in charge, a league victory at home to Offaly, in which he scored a point.

Cassidy was first called up to the Donegal senior team by Brian McEniff for winter training in 2003. With his county he played in the League, the Championship and the Dr McKenna Cup. With his club he scored a goal and a point in the final of the 2006 Donegal Senior Football Championship, which his team won.

His younger brother is Kevin Cassidy. Kevin has stated that it was watching Stephen play for Gaoth Dobhair as they won a Ghaeltacht Championship that inspired him to turn from soccer to Gaelic football. After Kevin was assaulted on 24 August 2008, na Casaidí became involved in a dispute with his attackers. A court case resulted, though the case took almost four years to come before the court. In July 2012, Stephen Cassidy was found guilty of assault causing harm and sentenced to community service, the judge noting that none of the men involved had appeared in court since that time and none had had any previous offences like it.
