= Martin Coll =

Irish Gaelic footballer

Martin Coll is a Gaelic footballer who played with Donegal as a defender. He was the1st representative of Gaoth Dobhair to start a championship game for Donegal in over 2 decades but was sent off early on (1998 Ulster Semi-Final). He continued his involvement with Donegal into the 21st century.
