= Finian Ward =

Gaelic footballer

Finian Ward is a Gaelic footballer who played with Donegal. Brian McEniff called him in to the seniors in 1972. He won the 1974 Ulster Senior Final, two Railway Cups and was a replacement All-Star.
