= Martin O'Reilly (Gaelic footballer) =

Donegal Gaelic footballer (born 1993)

Personal information
- Native name: Máirtín Ó Raghallaigh (Irish)
- Nickname: Marty
- Born: 15 February 1993 (age 33) Letterkenny, Ulster, Ireland
- Occupation: Primary school teacher
- Height: 1m 76 cm

Sport
- Sport: Gaelic football
- Position: Right half forward
Club
- Years: Club
- 2010–: Seán Mac Cumhaills
College
- Years: College
- Marino Institute of Education
Inter-county
- Years: County
- 2012–2019: Donegal
Inter-county titles
- Ulster titles: 2
- All-Irelands: 1

Martin 'Marty' O'Reilly is an Irish Gaelic footballer and hurler who plays for Seán Mac Cumhaills of Ballybofey and also, formerly, for the Donegal county football team.

He plays both football and hurling for his club. He was a member of the Donegal panel that won the 2012 All-Ireland Senior Football Championship Final.

== Early life and education ==
O'Reilly attended college in Marino Institute of Education and is now a primary school teacher in Castleknock, Dublin. He is related to former Mayo footballers Willie Joe Padden and Billy Joe Padden.

His father Terry, a former garda from Gleann Lára (English: Glenlara), a townland near Belmullet, County Mayo, in the West of Ireland, is club chairman of Seán MacCumhaill's.

== Playing career ==
=== Underage ===
He was held scoreless in the 2012 Corn Na Mac Leinn final by. He played in the loss to Cavan in the 2013 Ulster Under-21 Football Championship final. He played in the under-21 team that lost to Cavan again in the 2014 Ulster final.

=== Senior ===
==== Jim McGuinness: 2011–14 ====
Jim McGuinness first called O'Reilly into the Donegal county football team in late 2011. A member of the Donegal panel that won the 2012 All-Ireland Senior Football Championship Final against Mayo, he was an unused substitute in the final.

==== Bonner–McGuinness interim: 2014–17 ====
O'Reilly started Rory Gallagher's first match in charge of the county, a 2015 Dr McKenna Cup away defeat to Derry. He started the first match of the 2015 National Football League (also against Derry but at home), contributing 0–2 to the team's victory. He also started the next game against Dublin at Croke Park. He started the third fixture against Cork in Ballyshannon and contributed 0–4 to the team's one-point victory. He also started the fourth fixture against Monaghan, the fifth fixture against Kerry, the sixth fixture against Tyrone and the seventh fixture against Mayo.

O'Reilly made a substitute appearance in the 2015 Ulster Senior Football Championship final. He had previously started the preliminary round against Tyrone, the quarter-final against Armagh (scoring a goal) and the semi-final against Derry (scoring another goal, in the 45th minute). He also started the 2015 All-Ireland Senior Football Championship qualifier defeat of Galway at Croke Park.

O'Reilly started the opening fixture of the 2016 National Football League away to Down. He started the second fixture against Cork, a ten-point win in Ballyshannon, contributing 1–1 to the team's victory. He also started the third, fourth, fifth, sixth and seventh fixtures against Mayo, Kerry, Roscommon, Dublin and Monaghan. Donegal qualified for the NFL semi-final. O'Reilly also started this game.

O'Reilly started the 2016 Ulster Senior Football Championship final. He had previously started the quarter-final against Fermanagh (scoring 0–2) and the semi-final replay against Monaghan (scoring 0–3). O'Reilly also started the 2016 All-Ireland Senior Football Championship qualifier defeat of Cork at Croke Park and the next game against Dublin at the same venue.

O'Reilly started the opening fixture of the 2017 National Football League against Kerry, scoring a point and winning a 24th-minute penalty which was converted by Michael Murphy. He started the second fixture away to Roscommon, contributing 0–3 to the team's victory. He also started the third fixture against Dublin, the fifth fixture against Tyrone and the sixth fixture against Monaghan. He started the seventh fixture against Mayo and scored 0–1.

O'Reilly started the 2017 Ulster Senior Football Championship quarter-final victory against Antrim and the semi-final loss to Tyrone, scoring 0–1 in the latter game. He also started the 2017 All-Ireland Senior Football Championship qualifier defeat of Meath at Páirc Tailteann. He then made a substitute appearance in the qualifier loss to Galway at Markievicz Park and scored 0–2.

==== Declan Bonner: 2017–19 ====
Under the management of Gallagher's successor Declan Bonner, O'Reilly started in the opening fixture of the 2018 National Football League against Kerry in Killarney, as well as the next game against Galway. He made a late substitute appearance against Dublin in the third game and an earlier one against Monaghan in the sixth game.

O'Reilly withdrew from senior inter-county football ahead of the 2019 championship after experiencing limited match time during the 2019 National Football League. He had started the second fixture against Meath and scored a point but was substituted for Stephen McMenamin in the second half. McMenamin started each of the remaining fixtures in the competition. O'Reilly transferred to Philadelphia for the summer. He won the Philadelphia Championship there in August 2019, the Saturday before he returned to Ireland to play for his club Seán MacCumhaills in the 2019 Donegal Senior Football Championship.

== Personal life ==
O'Reilly runs a sports shop in Ballybofey.

== Honours ==
Donegal

- All-Ireland Senior Football Championship: 2012
- Ulster Senior Football Championship: 2012, 2014
- National Football League Division 2: 2019

?

- Philadelphia Championship: 2019
