= Peter McGee =

Gaelic footballer (active 2010s)

Peter McGee is a Gaelic footballer who played with Donegal. His older brother Neil also played with Donegal. Peter McGee won an Ulster U21 Title and was part of the team that reached the 2010 All-Ireland Under-21 Football Championship Final. He later won an All-Ireland Senior Title in 2012. He saved the life of a drowning woman in 2021.
