= Leo McLoone =

Donegal Gaelic football coach, player and teacher

Personal information
- Native name: Leo Mac Giolla Uain (Irish)
- Born: 1989 (age 36–37) Letterkenny
- Occupation: Secondary school teacher

Sport
- Sport: Gaelic football
- Position: Centre Forward
Clubs
- Years: Club
- 200?– c. 2017: Naomh Conaill; Donegal New York
Club titles
- Donegal titles: 8
Inter-county
Years	County	Apps (scores)
2008–2019	Donegal	109
Inter-county titles
- Ulster titles: 5
- All-Irelands: 1
- All Stars: 0

Leo McLoone (born 1989) is an Irish Gaelic footballer who plays for Naomh Conaill and also, formerly, the Donegal county team.

A versatile player, often employed as a forward, he has been an important source of goals for club and county.

McLoone made 109 appearances for his county, winning five Ulster Senior Football Championships and one All-Ireland Senior Football Championship. He was "the last of that famous Naomh Conaill four that also included Anthony Thompson, Dermot Molloy and Marty Boyle" to retire from inter-county football, doing so, as has been his custom, without making a public announcement.

== Early life ==
McLoone's father was captain of the team that reached the Senior County Championship final in 1965.

== Playing career ==
=== Club ===
As a 16-year-old, McLoone was introduced as a substitute in the final of the 2005 Donegal Senior Football Championship (SFC), which the club won for the very first time. The game was drawn, so went to a replay; McLoone's substitute appearance in the drawn final was his senior championship debut.

McLoone inspired his club to the Donegal SFC title for a second time in 2010, with a man of the match display. Then he inspired them to the final of the 2010 Ulster Senior Club Football Championship, knocking out Cavan champions Kingscourt, Monaghan champions Clontibret and Tyrone champions Coalisland along the way.

A brawl among dozens of people after a 2011 Donegal Senior Football Championship game between Naomh Conaill and Glenswilly at Davy Brennan Memorial Park led to McLoone breaking several bones in his face and the Donegal Competition's Controls Committee (CCC) launching an investigation. McLoone had to have surgery to have a plate put into his eye socket.

McLoone was 'man-of-the-match' in the final of the 2015 Donegal Senior Football Championship, as him and his club claimed their third title. He also captained that team.

With Ciarán Thompson now as captain, Naomh Conaill won another Donegal SFC in 2019, after a three-game final in which McLoone was held scoreless in the first two games, but scored a point in the third game's first half.

The club retained the Donegal SFC title in 2020, with the final being delayed until August 2021 due to the impact of the COVID-19 pandemic on Gaelic games.

Then he won the 2022 Donegal Senior Football Championship, making a substitute appearance in the final. He also won the 2023 Donegal Senior Football Championship. Ahead of the 2023 final, McLoone (alongside Marty Boyle, Stephen McGrath, Anthony Thompson and Eoin Waide) was recognised for making a 100th club championship appearance.

McLoone played for his club in the 2025 Donegal SFC, when his club won the final again, with McLoone scoring 0–1 as a substitute in that game and receiving his eighth winners' medal from 13 appearances in the decider.

McLoone played for Donegal New York in 2017, winning a New York Senior Football Championship.

=== Inter-county ===
==== Underage ====
McLoone played in the Ulster Minor Football Championship final as Donegal won a first such title in 10 years at Croke Park in 2006.

McLoone played for Donegal throughout the 2010 Ulster Under-21 Football Championship campaign, a competition which the team won and in which McLoone scored two points in each of the quarter-final and semi-final. He then played in the final of the 2010 All-Ireland Under-21 Football Championship, which Donegal (managed by Jim McGuinness) narrowly lost to Dublin (managed by Jim Gavin), though McLoone scored a goal.

==== Senior ====
Brian McIver gave McLoone his senior Donegal debut in 2008; McLoone was a substitute against Mayo. McIver's successor John Joe Doherty gave McLoone his first start during a 2009 All-Ireland SFC qualifier win against Carlow at MacCumhaill Park.

In March 2011, McLoone broke his ankle. Then, upon returning to the game, he sustained a horrific injury during a club meeting between Naomh Conaill and Glenswilly; a double fracture of his eye socket which required surgery. The injury caused him to miss Donegal's Ulster Senior Football Championship final win over Derry. He had come off the bench to help Donegal overcome Tyrone in the semi-final. He had only returned for Donegal from his broken ankle in the Ulster SFC quarter-final victory over Cavan. He was eventually declared fit for Donegal's All-Ireland semi-final clash with Dublin; however Donegal lost that game.

On 16 June 2012, he scored an important goal against Derry to help Donegal through to an Ulster Senior Football Championship semi-final meeting with Tyrone. He was subsequently named in the team for the final. He had a terrific game in that final on 22 July 2012 as Donegal retained the Ulster title for the first time in their history with a 2–18 to 0–13 victory over Down. McLoone scored a goal in the final. He played in the 2012 All-Ireland Senior Football Championship final against Mayo.

He added a third Ulster SFC in 2014.

And in some ways, the frustration of being behind the wire was almost preferable to that which he had gone through in the first two years under Rory Gallagher.

Under the management of Rory Gallagher, McLoone fell by the wayside. He was absent by his own choice for six months of the 2015 season but returned in 2016. However, he only started four matches (each one in the 2016 National Football League. He scored a goal against Mayo during a second-half substitute appearance in the same competition. Then, in the opening match of the 2016 Ulster Senior Football Championship, he appeared as an early substitute only to be taken off again at half-time. He did not make another appearance in the competition. He had 54 minutes of play as a substitute in the two matches against Cork and Dublin during the 2016 All-Ireland Senior Football Championship.

Frustrated at the lack of regular play, McLoone departed from the county team in 2017. He headed stateside. Manager Declan Bonner convinced him to return for 2018. But he would not be a regular starter, in was to be his last two years of inter-county play. Though initially thought doubtful for the National Football League opener against Kerry, McLoone started and completed most of the game, before making way for Jason McGee late on. He also started the six remaining fixtures against Galway, Dublin, Kildare, Tyrone, Monaghan and Mayo.

McLoone started the final as Donegal secured the 2018 Ulster Senior Football Championship.

McLoone made a late substitute appearance against Clare in the opening fixture of the 2019 National Football League in Ennis. He then made substitute appearances in the fixtures against Meath, Tipperary and Fermanagh. He started the fifth, sixth and seventh fixtures against Armagh, Cork and Kildare. It was during this competition that McLoone made his 100th senior appearance for Donegal. Following his 101st appearance in the next match (against Armagh, which was also his first start of the season), he was presented with an honour to commemorate his achievement. Donegal qualified for the National Football League Division 2 final and McLoone started the game as Donegal defeated Meath to win the title. McLoone collected his fifth and final Ulster SFC in 2019, appearing as a substitute in the final against Cavan. He decided to retire from inter-county football at the age of 30 at the end of the 2019 season, but this only became public knowledge much later (though manager and teammates were aware). Declan Bonner confirmed McLoone had retired while speaking at a press event on 25 January 2020 ahead of Donegal's second National Football League game of the season, away to Meath. He made 109 appearances for his county.

== Coaching career ==
While still playing with Donegal, McLoone was involved with the Naomh Conaill management team.

In March 2021, Donegal announced him as part of Gary Duffy's under-20 management team.

In November 2022, McLoone succeeded Duffy as Donegal under-20 team manager.

== Personal life ==
McLoone is regarded as media shy. According to clubmate and former Donegal player John Gildea: "The one thing you'd never find with Leo McLoone was any level of arrogance… He gave absolutely everything at training and when he played for Donegal. But at the end of it all he was always happy to sit at the back of the bus and let others make the noise".

He got engaged around the time of his Donegal playing retirement.

== Honours ==
Donegal

- All-Ireland Senior Football Championship: 2012
- Ulster Senior Football Championship: 2011, 2012, 2014, 2018, 2019
- National Football League Division 2: 2011, 2019
- Dr McKenna Cup: 2010
- All-Ireland Under-21 Football Championship runner-up: 2010
- Ulster Under-21 Football Championship: 2010
- Ulster Minor Football Championship: 2006
- Ulster Minor Football League: 2006

Naomh Conaill

- Donegal Senior Football Championship: 2005, 2010, 2015, 2019, 2020, 2022, 2023, 2025
- Donegal Under-21 Football Championship: 2007, 2008, 2010

Donegal New York

- New York Senior Football Championship: 2017
