= Stephen McBrearty =

Donegal Gaelic footballer

Personal information
- Born: 1996

Sport
- Sport: Gaelic football
Club
- Years: Club
- 20??–: Cill Chartha
Club titles
- Donegal titles: 1
Inter-county
- Years: County
- 2016–2018: Donegal
- Ulster titles: 1

Stephen McBrearty is an Irish Gaelic footballer who plays for Cill Chartha and also, formerly, the Donegal county team.

He is the younger brother of Patrick McBrearty.

== Playing career ==
=== Club ===
With his club Cill Chartha, McBrearty won a Donegal Minor Football Championship title in 2012. However, he was not fully fit for the final due to a knee ligament injury sustained the semi-final.

He won the 2017 Donegal Senior Football Championship. It was the first time his club had won the title in 24 years.

=== Inter-county ===
First featuring for his county at senior level under the management of Rory Gallagher, McBrearty was first called up ahead of the 2016 season as one of twelve new recruits, alongside such players as Eoghan Bán Gallagher and Stephen McMenamin. McBrearty made a number of appearances during Donegal's Division One campaign in the 2016 National Football League: first he was a second-half substitute in the league opener against Down, then a second-half substitute in the fifth round of fixtures against Roscommon, and then a second-half substitute in the seventh round of fixtures against Monaghan. He also made a substitute appearance in the league semi-final defeat to Dublin.

McBrearty made a substitute appearance for Donegal against Kerry in the opening round of the 2017 National Football League. He made other substitute appearances against Dublin and Tyrone in the third and fifth round of fixtures respectively.

Under the management of Declan Bonner, McBrearty scored a point as a second-half substitute against Kerry in Killarney in the opening fixture of the 2018 National Football League. He started the next game against Galway and scored two points. He started the next game away to Dublin and scored a point. He appeared as a substitute in the fourth game against Kildare. He made a second-half substitute appearance against Tyrone in the next game and scored a point. He started the sixth game against Monaghan. He made a substitute appearance in the seventh game against Mayo.

McBrearty did not play in the 2018 Ulster Senior Football Championship final, in which Donegal defeated Fermanagh. He made a late substitute appearance in the preliminary round against Cavan, but featured in neither the quarter-final against Derry nor the semi-final against Down.

Alongside club mates Mark McHugh and Ciaran McGinley, McBrearty opted out of the Donegal panel for the 2019 season. He had his appendix removed in mid-2019.

== Honours ==
Donegal

- Ulster Senior Football Championship: 2018

Cill Chartha

- Donegal Senior Football Championship: 2017
- Donegal Minor Football Championship: 2012
