= Ciarán Moore =

Irish Gaelic footballer

Personal information
- Born: Letterkenny, Ireland
- Height: 1.83 m (6 ft 0 in)

Sport
- Sport: Gaelic Football
- Position: Left half-back
Club
- Years: Club
- 2022–: St Eunan's
Club titles
- Donegal titles: 1
Inter-county
- Years: County
- 2024–: Donegal
Inter-county titles
- Ulster titles: 2
- All-Irelands: 0
- NFL: 1
- All Stars: 0

Ciarán Moore is an Irish Gaelic footballer who plays for St Eunan's and the Donegal county team. His first season as a Senior Inter-county player was 2024, with Jim McGuinness identifying his potential from very early on in his second term as Donegal manager. McGuinness played Moore in the challenge match against Roscommon in Ballyshannon that began his second spell in charge. McGuinness had Moore play every Senior match except one in 2024 and then had him in every match in 2025, after spotting him one day at Davy Brennan Memorial Park in Glenties playing against his own club, Naomh Conaill, for St Eunan's in a round-robin Group Match in the 2023 Donegal Senior Football Championship. Moore first lined out for Donegal in a challenge match against Roscommon a short while after McGuinness returned.

Moore became particularly useful at filling in for various players who were injured in 2025, including Eoghan Bán Gallagher and Caolan McGonagle. He scored an extra-time goal to defeat Armagh in the 2025 Ulster Senior Football Championship Final. Kerry's Pat Spillane praised him after that. Then Moore scored the winning point to knock Mayo out of the 2025 Championship race. He scored Donegal's second goal against Meath in the All Ireland semi-final victory.

== Personal life ==
He plays golf and his cousin is Olivia Jane Moore . He won the 2024 Donegal Senior Football Championship with his club.

== Honours ==
Donegal

- Ulster Senior Football Championship: 2024, 2025
- National Football League Division 2: 2024

St Eunan's

- Donegal Senior Football Championship: 2024

Individual

- All Star: 0
  - Nominated in 2025
- All Stars Young Footballer of the Year nominee: 2024
