= Paddy Hegarty =

Gaelic footballer

Paddy Hegarty is a Gaelic footballer who played with Donegal. He won an All-Ireland Under-21 Title in 1987 and played an important role in helping Donegal knock out Down (the previous All-Ireland winners) in the first round of Ulster in 1995. He was abroad during the 1992 All-Ireland winning campaign. His brother Noel also played for Donegal.
