= Ciaran McGinley =

Donegal Gaelic footballer

Sport
- Sport: Gaelic football
Club
- Years: Club
- 20??–: Cill Chartha
Club titles
- Donegal titles: 1
Inter-county
- Years: County
- 20??–2018: Donegal
- Ulster titles: 1

Ciaran McGinley is an Irish Gaelic footballer who plays for Cill Chartha and also, formerly, the Donegal county team.

He won an Ulster Under-21 Football Championship in 2010 and an Ulster Senior Football Championship in 2018.

== Playing career ==
=== Club ===
He won the 2017 Donegal Senior Football Championship. It was the first time his club had won the title in 24 years, having been defeated by Glenswilly at the same stage the previous year.

=== Inter-county ===
==== Jim McGuinness: 2010 ====
McGinley played during the 2010 All-Ireland Under-21 Football Championship, in which Donegal reached the final, and also featured in the Ulster under-21 campaign under the management of Jim McGuinness.

==== Bonner–McGuinness interim: 2014–17 ====
Under the management of Rory Gallagher, McGinley received a call-up to the Donegal senior football panel in late 2014. He started Gallagher's first match in charge, a 2015 Dr McKenna Cup away defeat to Derry.

He started the opening fixture of the 2015 National Football League, also against Derry, albeit at home but was substituted in the first half. He appeared as a second-half substitute in the seventh fixture against Mayo but was then substituted himself sixteen minutes later.

==== Declan Bonner: 2017–18 ====
Under the management of Declan Bonner, McGinley scored a point in a substitute appearance against Galway in the second round of the 2018 National Football League. He also came on as a substitute in the next game, away to Dublin.

McGinley made substitute appearances against Cavan (preliminary round) and Derry (quarter-final) during the 2018 Ulster Senior Football Championship, which Donegal won; however, he did not play in the semi-final or final.

Alongside club mates Mark McHugh and Stephen McBrearty, McGinley opted out of the Donegal panel for the 2019 season.

== Honours ==
Donegal

- Ulster Senior Football Championship: 2018
- All-Ireland Under-21 Football Championship runner-up: 2010
- Ulster Under-21 Football Championship: 2010

Cill Chartha

- Donegal Senior Football Championship: 2017
