= Enda McCormick =

Donegal Gaelic footballer

Personal information
- Born: 1997 or 1998 (age 28–29)

Sport
- Sport: Gaelic football
- Position: Forward
Club
- Years: Club
- 201?–: Termon
Inter-county
- Years: County
- 2017– 2022–: Donegal; London

Enda McCormick (born 1997/8) is an Irish Gaelic footballer who has played for Termon and both the Donegal and London county teams. He plays as a forward.

McCormick represented Donegal at minor and under-20 level. He was part of the team that reached the 2016 All-Ireland Minor Football Championship semi-finals.

McCormick scored a goal against Galway at Croke Park in 2016.

First featuring for his county at senior level under the management of Rory Gallagher, McCormick was 19 years of age then. He was named on the bench for the 2017 Ulster Senior Football Championship game against Antrim. In 2019, he was tipped for a return to the county senior squad. Declan Bonner called him up again for the county ahead of the 2020 season.

Alongside Termon teammate Nathan McElwaine, he played for London in the 2022 National Football League. He scored 1–2 in London's opening game victory over Carlow. He made his championship debut for London against Leitrim later that year.

St Eunan's opted to forego the club's right to a replay as a result of substitute McCormick's illegal point in a 2025 Donegal Senior Football Championship game against Termon, doing so in the belief that it "would cause disruption to the championship and risk undermining its integrity". The approach of St Eunan's to this injustice was described as "a touch of class" and "handled with class". The incident brought comparisons with the 2023 All-Ireland Club final when Kilmacud Crokes did a similar thing to Glen. St Eunan's players pointed out the error to officials, but to no avail.
