= Aaron Doherty =

Donegal Gaelic footballer

Personal information
- Occupation: Factory worker

Sport
- Sport: Gaelic football
- Position: Half-back
Club
- Years: Club
- 2018–: Naomh Columba
Inter-county
- Years: County
- 2019–: Donegal
- Ulster titles: 3

Aaron Doherty is an Irish Gaelic footballer who plays for Naomh Columba and the Donegal county team.

== Playing career ==
Doherty played football at minor level for Donegal, and was a star player at underage level for his club, Naomh Columba.

He has also played association football for Finn Harps at underage level, as well as St Catherine's and Letterbarrow Celtic.

He was first called into the Donegal senior team during the 2019 season, following the departure of other players. He won an Ulster Senior Football Championship medal shortly afterwards, his first Ulster medal at any level of play.

Doherty started Donegal's fifth fixture of the 2022 National Football League against Monaghan, scoring a point. He then started the sixth fixture against Dublin at Croke Park, scoring another point.

Doherty made a substitute appearance in the 2022 Ulster Senior Football Championship final, scoring an extra-time point from a mark. He had earlier made substitute appearances in the quarter-final victory over Armagh and the semi-final victory over Cavan. He started the 2022 All-Ireland Senior Football Championship qualifier loss to Armagh, scoring a point.

Doherty did not feature in the Donegal panel for the 2023 season. He opted to focus on his club football at this time.

With Jim McGuinness returning as manager, Doherty returned to the Donegal panel, featuring in a number of league matches and getting on the score sheet in a many of those fixtures, including the Division 2 final, where Doherty scored the deciding point to defeat rivals Armagh.

In the final of the 2024 Ulster Senior Football Championship, Doherty scored two penalties in the shootout as Donegal defeated Armagh once again.

== Personal life ==
Doherty is from near Teelin, in the parish of Gleann Cholm Cille. He attended Coláiste na Carraige and Dublin Institute of Technology. He is a first cousin of former Donegal panel member Philip Doherty.

== Honours ==
- Ulster Senior Football Championship: 2019, 2024, 2025
- National Football League Division 2: 2024
- EirGrid U20 Football Championship Player of the Year: 2020
