= Finnbarr Roarty =

Irish Gaelic footballer

Personal information
- Born: Letterkenny, Ireland
- Height: 1.83 m (6 ft 0 in)

Sport
- Sport: Gaelic Football
- Position: Right corner-back
Club
- Years: Club
- Naomh Conaill
Club titles
- Donegal titles: 1
Inter-county
- Years: County
- 2025–: Donegal
Inter-county titles
- Ulster titles: 1
- All-Irelands: 0
- NFL: 0
- All Stars: 1

Finnbarr Roarty is an Irish Gaelic footballer who plays for the Donegal county team. He is a former Minor and Under-20 captain of Donegal. He made his Senior inter-county debut against Armagh a short while before he turned 18. It was reported at the time that he was Donegal's first Senior inter-county player who had yet to make his Senior debut for his club. His premature debut led to two-week suspension for Roarty and an eight-week suspension for manager Jim McGuinness with the McGuinness suspension later overturned because McGuinness was not involved in picking the team. Roarty played in his first National League match for Donegal in 2025 at MacCumhaill Park against Dublin as a corner-back. He played in his first SFC match for Donegal on 6 April 2025 against Derry. He won the Man of the Match award in the All Ireland semi-final victory over Meath. His impact on the team was praised by Conor McManus and Michael Murphy.

Roarty played for his club in the 2025 Donegal SFC, when his club won the final, with Roarty scoring 0–3 in that game. It was his first time to win it.

== Honours ==
Donegal

- Ulster Senior Football Championship (1): 2025

Naomh Conaill

- Donegal Senior Football Championship: 2025

Individual

- GAA/GPA Young Footballer of the Year: 2025
- Ulster Colleges All-Star (2): 2023, 2024
