= Davy Brennan Memorial Park =

Coordinates: 54.794°N 8.296°W

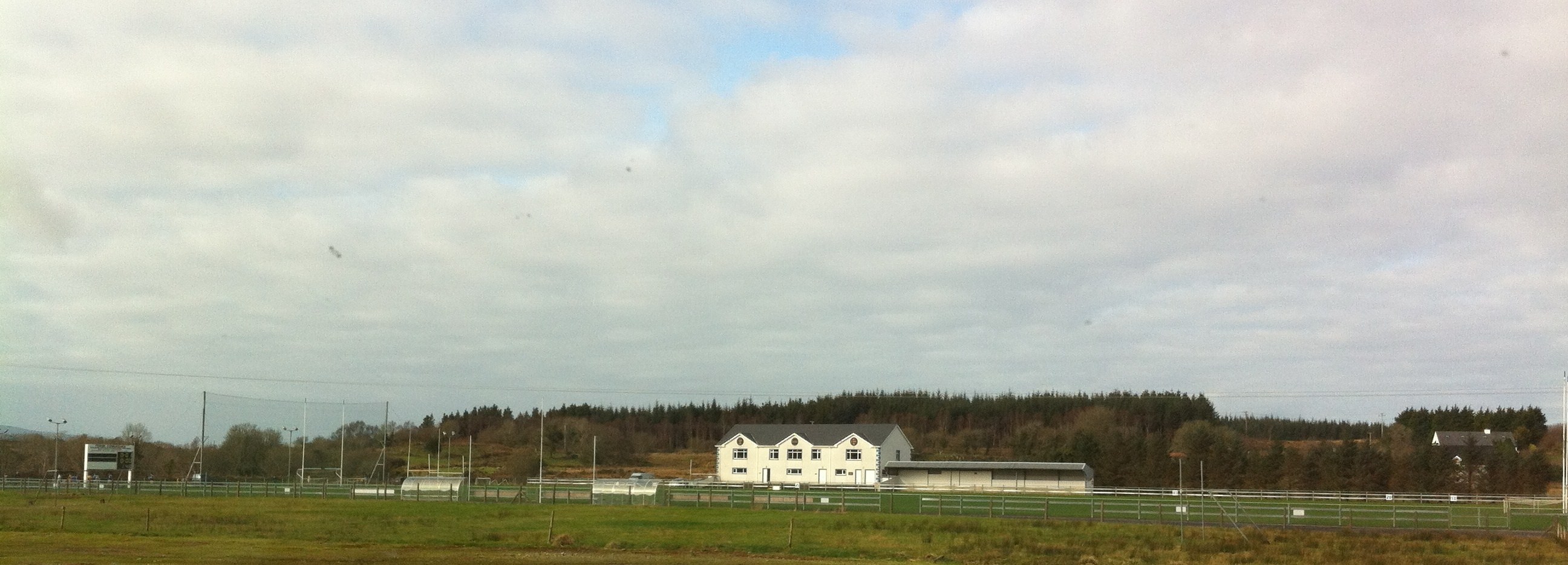
Grounds in 2012

Davy Brennan Memorial Park is the home ground of the Naomh Conaill GAA club, which is located in the townland of Carraigbrac, near the town of Glenties, County Donegal, Ireland. It has also been used to host trials for possible county players.

A brawl among dozens of people after a 2011 Donegal Senior Football Championship game between Naomh Conaill and Glenswilly at Davy Brennan Memorial Park led to Leo McLoone breaking several bones in his face (requiring surgery) and an investigation by the Donegal Competition's Controls Committee.
