= 2015 Dr McKenna Cup =

Tournament details
- Province: Ulster
- Year: 2015
- Trophy: Dr. McKenna Cup
- Sponsor: Bank of Ireland
- Teams: 12

Winners
- Champions: Tyrone (13th win)
- Manager: Mickey Harte
- Captain: Seán Cavanagh

Runners-up
- Runners-up: Cavan

The 2015 Dr McKenna Cup, known for sponsorship reasons as the Bank of Ireland Dr McKenna Cup, was an inter-county and colleges hurling competition in the province of Ulster. As well as the nine county teams, three colleges' teams competed: St Mary's University College, Belfast, Queen's University Belfast and Ulster University. The final was broadcast live on BBC Sport NI.

== Format ==
The teams are drawn into three groups of four teams. Each team plays the other teams in its group once, earning 2 points for a win and 1 for a draw. The three group winners, and the best runner-up progress to the semi-finals.

== Results ==
=== Final ===
24 January 2015

Tyrone	1-13 – 0-10	Cavan
Kyle Coney 0-5 (2f); Niall Morgan (3f), Paddy McNeice 0-3 each; Plunkett Kane 1-0; Sean Cavanagh, Niall McKenna, Mark Donnelly, Ciaran McGinley 0-1 each	Report	Martin Dunne 0-4 (2f); Eugene Keating, Cian Mackey 0-3 each; David Givney 0-1

Athletic Grounds, Armagh
Referee: Martin McNally (Monaghan)
