= Michael Langan (Gaelic footballer) =

Irish Gaelic footballer

Personal information
- Born: Gortnalake, Creeslough, Co.Donegal
- Occupation: Teacher
- Height: 6 ft 5 in (196 cm)

Sport
- Sport: Gaelic football
Club
- Years: Club
- 2016–: St Michael's
College
- Years: College
- Lyit (Now ATU)
Inter-county
- Years: County
- 2017–: Donegal
Inter-county titles
- Ulster titles: 4
- All Stars: 1

Michael Langan is an Irish Gaelic footballer who plays for St Michael's and the Donegal county team.

== Playing career ==
He won his first inter-county title while playing for the Donegal under-16 team in the 2013 Buncrana Cup. Langan was then part of the under-17 county team that won a Jim McGuigan Cup.

He played for Donegal in the Ulster Minor Football Championship, but his team did not win that competition. However, Langan played on a Donegal team that won the 2017 Ulster Under-21 Football Championship, and was awarded EirGrid GAA U21 Player of the Province for Ulster. Among the teams defeated in that competition was Tyrone, following a replay.

First featuring for his county at senior level under the management of Rory Gallagher, Langan made his senior debut for Donegal in the 2017 season. He made his league debut against Kerry in the opening fixture of the 2017 National Football League, where he was named to start at number 11 in the spine of the team. He did not score. He did not play in the following two fixtures, against Roscommon and Dublin respectively. He was restricted to substitute appearances in the final four games, against Cavan, Tyrone, Monaghan and Mayo respectively.

Later that year, Langan made his championship debut, as a substitute, against Antrim in the 2017 Ulster Senior Football Championship quarter-final. He also made a substitute appearance against Tyrone in the Ulster SFC semi-final, scoring 0–1; however, Donegal lost. In the 2017 All-Ireland Senior Football Championship Round 4A qualifier loss to Galway, Langan scored 0–1 during another substitute appearance.

Under the management of Declan Bonner, Langan continued to feature for his county. His first senior goal for Donegal came against Queen's in the 2018 Dr McKenna Cup. He scored 1–6 in total during that game. However, he did not play in the opening fixture of the 2018 National Football League, against Kerry. He also did not play in the second, third and fourth fixtures, against Galway, Dublin and Kildare respectively. He made a substitute appearance in the next fixture, against Tyrone, before starting the game against Monaghan. He did not play in the concluding fixture, against Mayo.

Langan started the 2018 Ulster Senior Football Championship preliminary round fixture against Cavan. He scored 0–3 on this debut, earning praise from Dermot Crowe in the Sunday Independent. Langan also started against Derry in the Ulster SFC quarter-final, against Down in the semi-final and against Fermanagh in the final, scoring one point against Fermanagh. In Group 2 of the 2018 All-Ireland Senior Football Championship quarter-final, he started the first game against Dublin (scoring 0–2), the second game against Roscommon (scoring 0–1) and the third game against Tyrone (scoring 0–1).

Langan spent the 2019 season out on the wing. He started the opening fixture of the 2019 National Football League, against Clare, and scored 0–4 (all from frees, including the game's first score). He also started against Meath, a game in which he scored 0–1 before being substituted at half-time. He did not play in the fixture against Tipperary. He started the next fixture, against Fermanagh, and scored 0–4 (all of which were frees). He also started the next fixture, against Armagh, and scored 0–5 (all of which were frees as well). However, he did not play in the last two fixtures, against Cork and Kildare respectively. According to manager Declan Bonner, Langan was "carrying a knock". He made a substitute appearance in the 2019 National Football League Division 2 final against Meath.

Langan started the 2019 Ulster Senior Football Championship quarter-final against Fermanagh, the semi-final against Tyrone and the final against Cavan, and scored 0–1 in each of the three games. In Group 1 of the 2019 All-Ireland Senior Football Championship quarter-final, Langan started all three games; he scored, respectively, 0–1 against Meath, 0–2 against Kerry, but was held scoreless in the last game, against Mayo.

By the 2020 National Football League, Langan had accumulated more than 40 appearances for his county. He was given a midfield role during this competition, in part due to injuries of other players. Langan started the opening fixture of the league that year, against Mayo, and scored 0–1. He started the second fixture, against Meath, and scored 1–1. Though he started the third fixture against Galway, Langan was held scoreless. He started the next game against Dublin, and scored 0–1. Against Monaghan in the next fixture, Langan started and scored five points in a ten-point victory for Donegal. Then the COVID-19 pandemic brought play to a halt. Play resumed behind closed doors on 18 October with a home game against Tyrone; Langan did not play in that game. He started the concluding league fixture of the campaign, against Kerry, but was held scoreless.

Langan then started the 2020 Ulster Senior Football Championship victory against Tyrone, scoring 1–2. He was named man of the match by the BBC, though RTÉ chose Ciarán Thompson. Langan was then selected as GAA.ie Player of the Week. He also started the 2020 Ulster SFC semi-final victory against Armagh, scoring 0–3. He then started the final, and scored Donegal's ninth point in the twentieth minute, in what proved to be the concluding game for his team that season.

Langan started each of Donegal's four fixtures of the 2021 National Football League, against Tyrone, Monaghan, Armagh and Dublin, scoring 0–1 against Tyrone, 1–1 against both Monaghan and Armagh, and 0–2 against Dublin. In the 2021 Ulster Senior Football Championship, he started each of Donegal's three fixtures, scoring 0–4 (including one free and one '45) against Down in the opening round, 0–3 against Derry in the quarter-final and 0–2 (including one free) against Tyrone in the semi-final. At the end of the season, he was nominated for an All Star, and was the only Donegal player to receive a nomination.

Langan started Donegal's opening fixture of the 2022 National Football League, against Mayo, and scored 0–4. He scored another 0–4 (including one free) in the second fixture, against Kildare. He did not play in the third game, away to Kerry, and he did not play in the fourth game either, at home to Tyrone. He was injured at the time. He also did not play in the fourth game (at home to Monaghan), nor did he play in the sixth game (away to Dublin), but he was introduced as a second-half substitute in the concluding league game against Armagh at O'Donnell Park.

In the 2022 Ulster Senior Football Championship, Langan started the quarter-final against Armagh, scoring 0–3. He also started the semi-final against Cavan and the final against Derry, but was held scoreless in both games. He started the 2022 All-Ireland Senior Football Championship qualifier loss to Armagh, but was again held scoreless.

Under the management of Bonner's successor Paddy Carr, Langan did not feature in the opening two fixtures of the 2023 National Football League, against Kerry and Tyrone respectively. He made his first start of the season in the third league fixture against Monaghan. He scored 0–4, and then followed it with a starting berth in the fourth fixture against Galway, in which he scored 0–1. He started the fifth fixture against Armagh, but was held scoreless. Then he started the last two fixtures of the league campaign, against Mayo (scoring 0–3, including two frees) and against Roscommon (scoring 0–1, from a free). Langan started the 2023 Ulster Senior Football Championship quarter-final against Down, but was held scoreless and went off injured following fifteen minutes of play, as his team lost the game. The "hamstring came off the bone" was how the injury he sustained during the game was later described. Langan featured in none of Donegal's three games against, respectively, Clare, Derry and Monaghan, in Group 4 of the 2023 All-Ireland Senior Football Championship. In the 2023 All-Ireland SFC preliminary quarter-final loss to Tyrone, Langan was also absent.

He did not return to action until September 2023 when he helped his club avoid relegation in a 2023 Donegal SFC play-off semi-final.

== Honours ==
Donegal

- Ulster Senior Football Championship: 2018, 2019, 2024, 2025
- National Football League Division 2: 2019, 2024
- Ulster Under-21 Football Championship: 2017
- Jim McGuigan Cup: 201?
- Buncrana Cup: 2013

Individual

- All Star: 2025
  - Nominated in 2020, 2024
- HE GAA Rising Star: 2019, 2020
- U21 Player of the Province for Ulster: 2017
- The Sunday Game Team of the Year: 2025
