= CLG Ghaoth Dobhair =

Donegal-based Gaelic games club

- Founded: 1931
- County: Donegal
- Nickname: Gaeltacht Men
- Colours: Green and White
- Grounds: Áras Mhic Eiteagáin, Machaire Gathlán
- Coordinates: 55°04′56.97″N 8°18′34.29″W

Playing kits
Standard colours

Senior Club Championships
	All Ireland	Ulster champions	Donegal champions
Football:	-	1	15

CLG Ghaoth Dobhair is a GAA club based in the parish of Gaoth Dobhair (anglicised to Gweedore) in northwest County Donegal, Ireland. They are one of the strongholds of Gaelic football in County Donegal.

Their home ground is at Machaire Gathlán, and (as of January 2024) they share the record for most wins in both the Donegal Senior Football Championship and the Comórtas Peile na Gaeltachta.

== History ==
Early records of Gaelic football played in Gaoth Dobhair date back as far as 1918. The sport of association football was a dominant rival in these years, with locals who worked in Scotland being influenced by the emergence of Celtic Football Club in Glasgow in the late 1880s. Then the Great War came and with it the influence of association football was greatly diminished in the locality. The scene was set for the re-emergence of Gaelic football.

Two teams existed in the parish until the late 1920s — one comprising players from the east of Derrybeg church, the other comprising players from the west of the same building. Matches drew enormous herds of people, an official record for one of these, played in 1928, indicated a gate collection of £12 from the passing of a cap among the crowd. However, an official club was yet to emerge. Cumann Lúthchleas Gael Ghaoth Dobhair was founded one night in November 1931, rather accidentally. Following the production of a play, a meeting had been held to form a drama group; at the meeting it was suggested by a man named Charlie Owenie that a Gaelic football team might as well be formed as well. A man by the name of Jim Size agreed and the club's first chairman, Dan Maloney, was appointed.

The first official team was established at the end of 1931 or start of 1932. A minor county title provided the parish with its first success of note in 1933; Gaoth Dobhair defeated Ballyshannon by a scoreline of 1–04 to 0-02. Gaoth Dobhair retained their title, winning against Letterkenny in 1934 by a scoreline of 3–10 to 1-04. A first senior title followed in 1935, with a defeat of Bundoran by a scoreline of 1–08 to 0-03 made possible by the progression of many of the minor players of the previous two years. Players on that 1935 side included Paddy Coll, John Chit, Hughie Dunlop, Danny Neddy (Gillespie), Nial Mac Aoidh, Con McLaughlin, Jimí Ó Baoill, Jimmy Phádaí Bhig, Eoghan Ellen Ó Baoill and Owenie Phádaí Pheadai.

Gaoth Dobhair's first championship meeting with Glenties (later Naomh Conaill) occurred in 1941; the clubs would play each other nine more times in the championship during the twentieth century (1941–1979), with Gaoth Dobhair winning all ten of those games.

However, a long barren spell at senior level was experienced when the club went without a single senior county title from 1961 to 2002.

The club also went more than two decades without a player starting a senior inter-county championship game, until Martin Coll played for Donegal against Cavan in the 1998 Ulster SFC semi-final.

Joseph Sweeney, who later co-founded the construction and engineering recruitment company Falcon Green, was a member of the panel that won the 2002 title.

Gaoth Dobhair are known for their physical handpassing and "never say die attitude" style of play.

The club has also been known for its Thursday night summer discos, which have reportedly been held since the 1970s. The events have served as a significant source of revenue for the club and have attracted attendees from surrounding areas, including Downings and Killybegs.

After a decline following the club's 2006 senior championship win, underage development began to improve during the mid-2010s, with successes in the under-14, under-15, under-16 and under-21 levels after a considerable drought. This success was attributed largely to coaching plans and an underage structure put in place by a number of members in the early 2000s. These underage teams have provided five senior players, eight under-21 and eleven minor players for their respective county teams in the past three years.

In the summer of 2012, Gaoth Dobhair won the Donegal and All-Ireland Comórtas Peile na Gaeltachta on their own pitch.

In the summer of 2012, after years of planning and development, a new pitch was built beside the clubhouse. In 2016 plans were laid down to replace the old pitch with a brand new one featuring a small stand opposite the clubhouse.

A delegation of coaches from the club visited La Masia (after FC Barcelona's youth academy had overtaken the Ajax Youth Academy) to see if they could apply its techniques to their young players.

Mervyn O'Donnell took over as manager in 2017. The following year Gaoth Dobhair their first Donegal Senior Football League since 2006. They then won their first senior championship, also for twelve years. They followed this with an historic first ever Ulster Senior Club Football Championship.

Despite dominating the local football scene, only two Gaoth Dobhair players have ever played in any of their county's All-Ireland Senior Football Championship-winning finals: these were Eamon and Neil McGee, both of whom started and finished the 2012 All-Ireland Senior Football Championship final when Donegal defeated Mayo. Eamon McGee received a yellow card during that game but was allowed to remain on the field of play. Peter McGee was also a squad member that day but had no part to play in the final.

== Notable players ==
- Kevin Cassidy — 2007 National Football League and 2011 Ulster SFC winner
- Stephen Cassidy
- Martin Coll
- James Gallagher
- Neily Gallagher — 1968 Railway Cup and 1974 Ulster SFC winner
- Neil McGee — 2007 National Football League and 2012 All-Ireland SFC winner
- Peter McGee — 2012 All-Ireland SFC winner
- Odhrán Mac Niallais — 2014 and 2018 Ulster SFC winner
- Cian Mulligan — 2018 Ulster SFC winner

== Stadium ==
Gaoth Dobhair's stadium is Áras Mhic Eiteagáin, which is located in the Machaire Gathlán area.

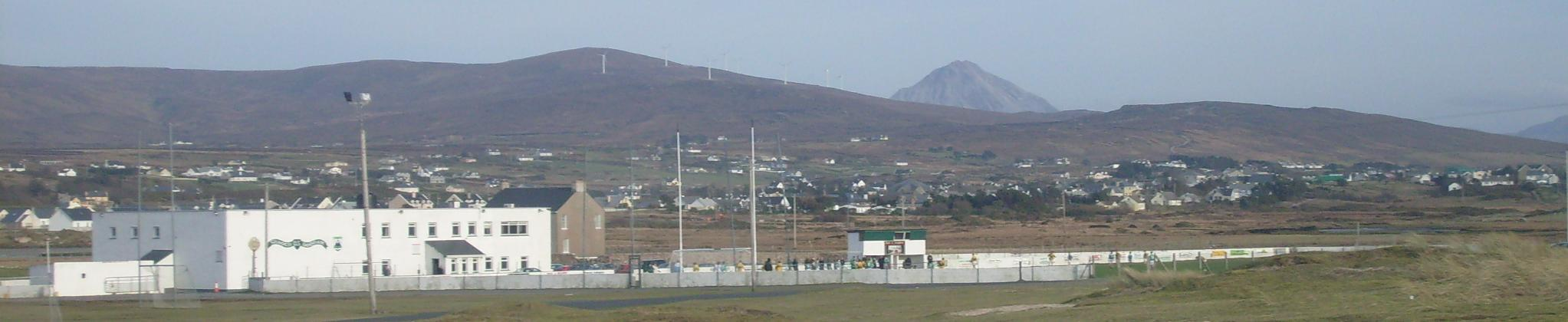
Gaoth Dobhair grounds in Machaire Gathlán

== Honours ==
Gaoth Dobhair have won a total of 15 Donegal Senior County Championships, which makes them the county's most successful club at senior level. They are the most successful team in Comórtas Peile na Gaeltachta history also, with nine wins, including one on their own pitch in 2012. CLG Ghaoth Dobhair was one of the first clubs nationally to win the Bonn Ór (gold medal) in Fondúireacht Sheosaimh Mhic Dhonncha in 2018 for their commitment to actively promote the Irish Language and making it an important aspect of the daily life of the club.

- Ulster Senior Club Football Championship: 2018
- Donegal Senior Football Championship: 1935, 1938, 1941, 1944, 1945, 1946, 1947, 1949, 1953, 1954, 1955, 1961, 2002, 2006, 2018
- Donegal Senior Football League: 1936, 1937, 1938, 1939, 1946, 1950, 1953, 1970, 1973, 2003, 2006, 2018
- Donegal County Gaeltacht Football Championship: 1969, 1971, 1972, 1973, 1978, 1993, 2002, 2003, 2004, 2005, 2007, 2008, 2010, 2012
- Comórtas Peile na Gaeltachta (Náisiúnta): 1969, 1975, 1976, 1994, 2002, 2004, 2006, 2007, 2012, 2013
- Donegal Intermediate Football Championship: 1985
- Donegal Junior Football Championship: 1935
- Ulster Under-21 Club Football Championship: 2017–18
- Donegal Under-21 Football Championship: 1971, 1984, 1991, 2005, 2016, 2017, 2022; 2023
