= 2015 Donegal county football team season =

Donegal county football team
2015 season
- Stadium: MacCumhaill Park, Ballybofey
- All-Ireland SFC: Quarter-finalist
- Ulster SFC: Finalist

The following is a summary of Donegal county football team's 2015 season.

The 2015 Donegal county football team season was the franchise's 111th season since the County Board's foundation in 1905. The team entered the season, having reached the 2014 All-Ireland Senior Football Championship Final.

== Personnel changes ==
Rory Gallagher was in his first season as the team's manager. He was ratified on 31 October 2014. In December 2014, Gary McDaid officially joined the backroom team as coach–selector.

Thirteen players were added ahead of the 2015 Dr McKenna Cup, including goalkeeper Mark Anthony McGinley, Eoin McHugh, Ciaran McGinley, Conor Parke, Eunan Doherty (Naomh Conaill) Kevin McBrearty (Four Masters) and Ryan Malley (Ard an Rátha).

Ahead of the season Rory Kavanagh announced his retirement. Mark McHugh returned.

Another veteran of the 2012 All-Ireland SFC winning campaign, Dermot Molloy, also departed, between the McKenna Cup's conclusion and League's beginning.

Michael Boyle left for Boston before the 2015 Ulster SFC semi-final and Mark Anthony McGinley, who had earlier joined the panel, was promoted to his position.

== Panel ==
Team as per Donegal v Galway, 2015 All-Ireland Senior Football Championship Qualifier, 1 August 2015

No.	Player	Position	Club
1	Paul Durcan	Goalkeeper	The Four Masters
2	Paddy McGrath	Right Corner Back	Ard an Rátha
3	Neil McGee	Full back	Gaoth Dobhair
4	Eamon McGee	Left Corner Back	Gaoth Dobhair
5	Ryan McHugh	Right half back	Cill Chartha
6	Anthony Thompson	Centre back	Naomh Conaill
7	Frank McGlynn	Left half back	Glenfin
8	Neil Gallagher	Midfield	Glenswilly
9	Martin McElhinney	Midfield	St Michael's
10	Christy Toye	Right half forward	Naomh Mícheál
11	Odhrán Mac Niallais	Centre forward	Gaoth Dobhair
12	Mark McHugh	Left half forward	Cill Chartha
13	Patrick McBrearty	Right Corner Forward	Cill Chartha
14	Michael Murphy (c)	Full forward	Glenswilly
15	Colm McFadden	Left Corner Forward	St Michael's

No.	Player	Position	Club
16	Mark Anthony McGinley	Substitute	St Michael's
17	Eamonn Doherty	Substitute	St Eunan's
18	Declan Walsh	Substitute	Malin
19	Martin O'Reilly	Substitute	Seán MacCumhaills
20	David Walsh	Substitute	Naomh Bríd
21	Hugh McFadden	Substitute	Na Cealla Beaga
22	Leo McLoone	Substitute	Naomh Conaill
23	Gary McFadden	Substitute	Glenswilly
24	Eoghan Bán Gallagher	Substitute	Na Cealla Beaga
25	Ciaran McGinley	Substitute	Cill Chartha
26	Daniel McLaughlin	Substitute	St Michael's

== Competitions ==
=== Dr McKenna Cup ===
The draw was made in early November 2014, with Derry, Fermanagh and Queen's Donegal's opponents in Section B of the competition.

Gallagher's first match in charge of the county was a 2015 Dr McKenna Cup away defeat to Derry.

Queen's was the second game; Dr McKenna Cup Section B up until that point ran as follows: Fermanagh 1–13 0–9 Queen's on Sunday 4 January; Derry 1–16 0–8 Donegal on Sunday 4 January; Donegal 2–16 1–8 Queen's on Sunday 11 January; Fermanagh 1–9 1–7 Derry on Sunday 11 January; Derry vs Queen's at Owenbeg on Wednesday 14 January at 19:30 GMT; Donegal vs Fermanagh at MacCumhaill Park on Wednesday 14 January at 19:30 GMT.

So Fermanagh was the third game.

=== National Football League Division 1 ===
Donegal advanced to the Division 1 semi-finals.

2015 Division 1 table

Pos	Team	Pld	W	D	L	F	A	D	Pts	Notes
2	Dublin	7	4	1	2	7–93	2–78	30	9	Advanced to NFL semi-finals
3	Monaghan	7	4	0	3	4-86	7–84	-7	8	Advanced to NFL semi-finals
4	Donegal	7	3	1	3	6–75	5–70	8	7	Advanced to NFL semi-finals
5	Mayo	7	3	1	3	8–79	7–79	3	7
6	Kerry	7	3	1	3	6–88	9-90	-11	7

^{1}Donegal, Mayo and Kerry are ranked by points difference.

31 January 2015
Round 1

Donegal	1-15 - 0-12	Derry
	Report

MacCumhaill Park, Ballybofey
Referee: Marty Duffy (Sligo)
7 February 2015
Round 2

Donegal	2-10 - 0-11	Dublin
	Report

Croke Park, Dublin
Referee: Maurice Deegan (Laois)
1 March 2015
Round 3

Donegal	0-12 - 1-08	Cork
	Report

Ballyshannon
Referee: Joe McQuillan (Cavan)
8 March 2015
Round 4

Donegal	1-04 - 0-09	Monaghan
	Report

O'Donnell Park, Letterkenny
Referee: P. Hughes (Armagh)
15 March 2015
Round 5

Kerry	2-13 - 2-11	Donegal
	Report

Tralee
Attendance: 6,250
Referee: R. Hickey (Clare)
29 March 2015
Round 6

Donegal	1-13 - 0-06	Tyrone
	Report

MacCumhaill Park, Ballybofey
Referee: Joe McQuillan (Cavan)
5 April 2015
Round 7

Mayo	0-12 - 1-09	Donegal
	Report

Attendance: 12,304
Referee: David Coldrick (Meath)
12 April 2015
Semi-final

Cork	4-11 - 0-19	Donegal
	Report

Croke Park, Dublin
Referee: M. Duffy (Sligo)

=== Ulster Senior Football Championship ===
Donegal advanced to their fifth consecutive Ulster final.

Preliminary round
Donegal	1-13
Tyrone	1-10

Quarter-finals
Cavan	0-15
Monaghan	0-16
Fermanagh	1-13
Antrim	0-08
Derry	0-12
Down	0-11
Armagh	0-08
Donegal	2-11

Semi-finals
Monaghan	1-20
Fermanagh	0-13
Derry	0-10
Donegal	1-09

Final
Monaghan	0-11
Donegal	0-10

17 May 2015
16:00
Preliminary round

Donegal	1-13 - 1-10	Tyrone
M McElhinney (1-2); M Murphy (0-3, 2 frees, 1 45); C Toye, C McFadden, P McBrearty (0-2 each); F McGlynn, K Lacey (0-1 each).	Report	S Cavanagh (0-4, 3 frees); D McCurry (1-0); C McAliskey (0-3); Justin McMahon, M Donnelly, R McNamee (0-1 each).

MacCumhaill Park, Ballybofey
Attendance: 17,435
Referee: Joe McQuillan (Cavan)
14 June 2015
14:00
Quarter-final

Armagh	0-08 - 2-11	Donegal
T Kernan 0-3 (1f), J Morgan, C McKeever, E Rafferty (f), A Findon, C Rafferty all 0-1 each.	Report	M Murphy 0-5 (5fs), P McBrearty 1-1, M O'Reilly 1-0, O MacNiallais 0-2, N Gallagher, M McElhinney, N Gallagher 0-1 each.

Athletic Grounds, Armagh
Attendance: 18,186
Referee: David Coldrick (Meath)
27 June 2015
19:00
Semi-final

Derry	0-10 - 1-09	Donegal
M Lynch 0-02, 1f, E Bradley 0-02, 2f, C O’Boyle 0-02, C McKaigue 0-01, C McFaul 0-01; N Holly 0-01, B Heron 0-01.	Report	M O’Reilly 1-00 P McBrearty, 0-02, 1f, M Murphy 0-02, C McFadden 0-02, M McElhinney 0-01; C Toye 0-01, O MacNiallais 0-01.

St Tiernach's Park, Clones
Attendance: 19,237
Referee: Rory Hickey (Clare)
19 July 2015
14:00
Final

Monaghan	0-11 - 0-10	Donegal
C McManus 0-6 (4f), K O'Connell, O Duffy, K Duffy, D Mone, O Lennon 0-1 each.	Report	P McBrearty 0-6 (4f), M Murphy 0-2 (2f), K Lacey, F McGlynn 0-1 each

St Tiernach's Park, Clones
Attendance: 31,997
Referee: David Coldrick (Meath)

=== All-Ireland Senior Football Championship ===
1 August
6:00 PM
Round 4B

Donegal	3-12 – 0-11	Galway
P McBrearty 1-1, C McFadden 0-4 (1f), R McHugh 1-0, C Toye 1-0, O MacNiallais 0-3, M Murphy 0-3 (2f), L McLoone 0-1	Report	G Sice 0-5 (5f), D Cummins 0-1, T Flynn 0-1, A Varley 0-1, P Conroy 0-1, S Walsh 0-1, D Comer 0-1 (1f)

Croke Park, Dublin
Referee: Eddie Kinsella (Laois)
8 August
6:00 PM
Quarter-final

Mayo	2-13 - 0-11	Donegal
Lee Keegan 1-2, Aidan O'Shea 1-0, Jason Doherty 0-3, Cillian O'Connor 0-3 (0-2f), Kevin McLoughlin 0-2, Keith Higgins 0-1, A Freeman 0-1, A Moran 0-1.	Report	Michael Murphy 0-8 (0-5f), Christy Toye 0-1, Leo McLoone 0-1, Anthony Thompson 0-1.

Croke Park, Dublin
Referee: David Gough (Meath)

== Management team ==
- Manager: Rory Gallagher
- Selectors: Gary McDaid, Jack Cooney
- Strength and conditioning coach: Paul Fisher

== Awards ==
=== Footballer of the Year ===
Frank McGlynn

=== GAA.ie Football Team of the Week ===
Included:

- 4 August: Ryan McHugh, Odhrán Mac Niallais, Colm McFadden
