= 2013 Ulster Senior Club Football Championship =

Gaelic games tournament

2013 Ulster Club Senior Football Championship
Tournament details
- Province: Ulster
- Year: 2013
- Trophy: Seamus McFerran Cup
- Sponsor: Allied Irish Banks
- Date: 20 October - 1 December 2013
- Teams: 9 (one from each of the 9 counties)
- Defending champions: Crossmaglen Rangers

Winners
- Champions: Ballinderry Shamrocks (3rd win)
- Manager: Martin McKinless
- Captain: Conor Nevin
- Qualify for: All-Ireland Club SFC

Runners-up
- Runners-up: Glenswilly
- Manager: Gary McDaid
- Captain: James Pat McDaid

Other
- Matches played: 9
- Total scored: 19-179
- Top Scorer: Michael Murphy (Glenswilly) (3-9)
- Website: Ulster GAA

The 2013 Ulster Senior Club Football Championship was the 46th instalment of the annual competition organised by Ulster GAA. It was one of the four provincial competitions of the 2013–14 All-Ireland Senior Club Football Championship.

Crossmaglen Rangers of Armagh were the defending champions, having defeated Kilcoo of Down in the 2012 final. Kilcoo would end their reign as champions at the quarter-final stage.

Derry's Ballinderry Shamrocks were crowned Ulster champions for the third time after defeating Donegal champions Glenswilly in the final.

== Teams ==
The Ulster championship is contested by the winners of the nine county championships in the Irish province of Ulster. Ulster comprises the six counties of Northern Ireland, as well as Cavan, Donegal and Monaghan in the Republic of Ireland.

County	Team	Last win
Antrim	St Gall's	2009
Armagh	Crossmaglen Rangers	2012
Cavan	Ballinagh	
Derry	Ballinderry Shamrocks	2001
Donegal	Glenswilly	
Down	Kilcoo	
Fermanagh	Roslea Shamrocks	
Monaghan	Scotstown	1989
Tyrone	Clonoe O'Rahilly's	

== Bracket ==
Preliminary Round
Ballinderry Shamrocks (Derry)	0-14
Clonoe O'Rahilly's (Tyrone)	0-10

Quarter-Finals
Glenswilly (Donegal)	1-10
St Gall's (Antrim)	0-10
Roslea Shamrocks (Fermanagh)	1-12
Ballinagh (Cavan)	0-11
Kilcoo (Down)	1-12; 3-10 (R) (aet)
Crossmaglen Rangers (Armagh)	2-9; 1-8 (R) (aet)
Scotstown (Monaghan)	0-10
Ballinderry Shamrocks (Derry)	1-8

Semi-Finals
Glenswilly (Donegal)	3-9
Roslea Shamrocks (Fermanagh)	2-8
Kilcoo (Down)	0-9
Ballinderry Shamrocks (Derry)	1-10

Final
Glenswilly (Donegal)	2-6
Ballinderry Shamrocks (Derry)	1-13

== Preliminary round ==
20 October 2013
15:30 GMT (UTC+0)
Preliminary Round

Ballinderry Shamrocks (Derry)	0-14 – 0-10	Clonoe O'Rahillys (Tyrone)
Ryan Bell 0-4 (0-1f), Aaron Devlin 0-3, Conleith Gilligan 0-2, Darren McKinless 0-1, Dermot McGuckin 0-1, Coilin Devlin 0-1, Conor Nevin 0-1, Darren Lawn 0-1	Report	Daniel McNulty 0-4 (0-3f), Connor McAliskey 0-3 (0-3f), P. J. Lavery 0-2, Ryan T. O'Neill 0-1

Celtic Park, Derry
Referee: Martin Higgins

== Quarter-finals ==
3 November 2013
14:30 GMT (UTC+0)
Quarter-final

Glenswilly (Donegal)	1-10 – 0-10	St Gall's (Antrim)
Michael Murphy 1-4 (1-0 pen, 0-1f, 0-2 45), Gary McFadden 0-3 (0-3f), Neil Gallagher 0-1, Kealan McFadden 0-1, Brian Farrelly 0-1	Report	CJ McGourty 0-5 (0-4f), Anthony Healy 0-1, Sean Burke 0-1, Kevin Niblock 0-1, Michael Pollock 0-1, Karl Stewart 0-1

MacCumhaill Park, Ballybofey
Referee: Pádraig Hughes

3 November 2013
14:30 GMT (UTC+0)
Quarter-final

Roslea Shamrocks (Fermanagh)	1-12 – 0-11	Ballinagh (Cavan)
Seamus Quigley 1-7 (1-0 pen, 0-5f), Sean Quigley 0-4, Shane Lynch 0-1	Report	Kevin Smith 0-3, Niall McDermott 0-2 (0-2f), David Finnegan 0-2, Padraic O'Reilly 0-1, Thomas Moore 0-1, Colin Gumley 0-1, Anthony Gaynor 0-1

Brewster Park, Enniskillen
Referee: Cathal O'Hagan

3 November 2013
14:30 GMT (UTC+0)
Quarter-final

Kilcoo (Down)	2-9 – 1-12	Crossmaglen Rangers (Armagh)
Darragh O'Hanlon 0-4 (0-3f), Ryan Johnston 1-1, Paul Devlin 0-3 (0-1f), Paul Greenan 1-0, Gerard McEvoy 0-1	Report	Tony Kernan 0-6 (0-6f), Stephen Kernan 1-1, Kyle Brennan 0-2, Martin Aherne 0-1, Johnny Hanratty 0-1, Callum Cumiskey 0-1

Páirc Esler, Newry
Referee: Barry Cassidy

3 November 2013
14:30 GMT (UTC+0)
Quarter-final

Scotstown (Monaghan)	0-10 – 1-8	Ballinderry Shamrocks (Derry)
Conor McCarthy 0-2 (0-2f), Kieran Hughes 0-2 (0-1f), Rory Beggan 0-1 (0-1f), James Turley 0-1, Shane Carey 0-1, Darren Hughes 0-1, Nicholas Corrigan 0-1, Brian McGinnity 0-1	Report	Darren Conway 1-0, Conleith Gilligan 0-2 (0-2f), Coilin Devlin 0-2 (0-1f), Michael McIver 0-1, Aaron Devlin 0-1, Dermot McGuckin 0-1, Ryan Bell 0-1

St Tiernach's Park, Clones
Referee: Noel Mooney

10 November 2013
14:30 GMT (UTC+0)
Quarter-final replay

Kilcoo (Down)	3-10 – 1-8 (a.e.t.)	Crossmaglen Rangers (Armagh)
Paul Devlin 2-2 (0-2f), Darragh O'Hanlon 0-4 (0-3f), Ryan Johnston 1-1, Niall McEvoy 0-1, Gerard McEvoy 0-1, James McClean 0-1	Report	Tony Kernan 1-3 (0-3f), Callum Cumiskey 0-2, Martin Aherne 0-1, Kyle Carragher 0-1, Aaron Cunningham 0-1

Athletic Grounds, Armagh
Referee: Joe McQuillan

== Semi-finals ==
17 November 2013
14:30 GMT (UTC+0)
Semi-final

Glenswilly (Donegal)	3-9 – 2-8	Roslea Shamrocks (Fermanagh)
Colin Kelly 2-1, Michael Murphy 1-2 (0-2f), Gary McFadden 0-3 (0-2f), Joe Gibbons 0-1, Ciaran Bonner 0-1, Darren McGinley 0-1	Report	Seamus Quigley 1-4 (1-0 pen, 0-2f), Conor Mulligan 1-0, James McMahon 0-1, Kevin Cosgrove 0-1, Peter Lynch 0-1, Dermot Reilly 0-1

Healy Park, Omagh
Referee: Ciaran Branagan

17 November 2013
14:30 GMT (UTC+0)
Semi-final

Kilcoo (Down)	0-9 – 1-10	Ballinderry Shamrocks (Derry)
Darragh O'Hanlon 0-3 (0-3f), Paul Devlin 0-2 (0-1f), Sean O'Hanlon 0-1, Conor Laverty 0-1, Jerome Johnston 0-1, Sean Devlin 0-1	Report	Michael McIver 1-2, Coilin Devlin 0-3 (0-3f), Ryan Bell 0-2, Conleith Gilligan 0-2, Dermot McGuckin 0-1

Athletic Grounds, Armagh
Referee: Martin Higgins

== Final ==
1 December 2013
15:00 GMT (UTC+0)
Final

Glenswilly (Donegal)	2-6 – 1-13	Ballinderry Shamrocks (Derry)
Michael Murphy 1-3 (0-1 45), Caolan Kelly 1-1, Colin Kelly 0-1, Darren McGinley 0-1	Report	Coilin Devlin 0-4 (0-1f), Michael McIver 1-0, Conleith Gilligan 0-2 (0-2f), James Conway 0-2, Dermot McGuckin 0-2, Darren McKinless 0-1, Aaron Devlin 0-1, Darren Conway 0-1

Healy Park, Omagh
Referee: Pádraig Hughes

== Championship statistics ==
=== Top scorers ===
Overall

Rank	Player	Club	Tally	Total	Matches	Average
1	Michael Murphy	Glenswilly	3-9	18	3	6.00
2	Seamus Quigley	Roslea Shamrocks	2-11	17	2	8.50
3	Paul Devlin	Kilcoo	2-7	13	3	4.33
4	Tony Kernan	Crossmaglen Rangers	1-9	12	2	6.00
5	Darragh O'Hanlon	Kilcoo	0-11	11	3	3.67
6	Coilin Devlin	Ballinderry Shamrocks	0-10	10	4	2.50
7	Michael McIver	Ballinderry Shamrocks	2-3	9	4	2.25
8	Colin Kelly	Slaughtneil	2-2	8	3	2.67
8	Ryan Johnston	Kilcoo	2-2	8	3	2.67
8	Conleith Gilligan	Ballinderry Shamrocks	0-8	8	4	2.00

In a single game

Rank	Player	Club	Tally	Total	Opposition
1	Seamus Quigley	Roslea Shamrocks	1-7	10	Ballinagh
2	Paul Devlin	Kilcoo	2-2	8	Crossmaglen Rangers
3	Colin Kelly	Glenswilly	2-1	7	Roslea Shamrocks
3	Michael Murphy	Glenswilly	1-4	7	St Gall's
3	Seamus Quigley	Roslea Shamrocks	1-4	7	Glenswilly
6	Michael Murphy	Glenswilly	1-3	6	Ballinderry Shamrocks
6	Tony Kernan	Crossmaglen Rangers	1-3	6	Kilcoo
6	Tony Kernan	Crossmaglen Rangers	0-6	6	Kilcoo
9	Michael Murphy	Glenswilly	1-2	5	Roslea Shamrocks
9	Michael McIver	Ballinderry Shamrocks	1-2	5	Kilcoo
9	CJ McGourty	St Gall's	0-5	5	Glenswilly
