= Ciaran Bonner =

Irish Gaelic footballer

Ciarán Bonner
Personal information
- Born: 5 March 1984 (age 42) Letterkenny, Ireland

Sport
- Sport: Gaelic football
- Position: Centre forward
Clubs
- Years: Club
- 2004–2011 pre-2009 2012: Glenswilly; Donegal Boston; Tír Chonaill Gaels
Club titles
- Donegal titles: 3
Inter-county
- Years: County
- 2006–2009 2012–?: Donegal; London
Inter-county titles
- NFL: 1

Ciaran Bonner is an Irish former Gaelic footballer who played for Glenswilly and the Donegal county team.

== Playing career ==
=== Club ===
Bonner was part of the Glenswilly team that won its first Donegal Senior Football Championship in 2011, with a 1–8 to 0–9 victory over St Michael's. He played in the 2007 final which Glenswilly lost. He later moved to the London club Tír Chonaill Gaels.

He also played for Donegal Boston.

He scored a goal in the final of the 2013 Donegal Senior Football Championship following a deft flick of the heel from Michael Murphy. That was Bonner's second Donegal Senior Football Championship. Bonner's team progressed to the final of the Ulster Senior Club Football Championship, which they lost to Ballinderry.

He won a third Donegal SFC in 2016, making a substitute appearance in the final.

He had retired by 2020.

=== Inter-county ===
Bonner's Donegal debut came against St Mary's in the Dr McKenna Cup. He played in the 2006 Ulster Senior Football Championship Final at Croke Park. He played many more games in the Ulster Senior Football Championship as well, and made an appearance at the semi-final stage in 2007. That same year he was part of the Donegal team that won the 2007 Dr McKenna Cup, as well as the 2007 National Football League, scoring 0–2 in the final at Croke Park. He was stretchered off the pitch in that game.

Bonner voluntarily left Donegal "for good" following the team's penultimate match of the 2008 National Football League, against Laois, a game in which he was substituted. However, he was then dropped by manager John Joe Doherty over a breach of discipline ahead of the 2009 All-Ireland Senior Football Championship qualifier game against Carlow, having been expected to start that game and having played in the previous game, an Ulster Senior Football Championship defeat to Antrim. Bonner played in the Connacht Senior Football Championship, making his debut for London against Leitrim in June 2012.

According to Keith Duggan — writing in The Irish Times in 2013 — Bonner "was among the most conspicuously talented of the county set-up in the uncertain years before Jim McGuinness took over but was absent for the revolution".

== Honours ==
Donegal

- National Football League: 2007
- Dr McKenna Cup: 2007

Glenswilly

- Donegal Senior Football Championship: 2011, 2013, 2016
