= Neil Gallagher (Donegal footballer) =

Donegal Gaelic footballer

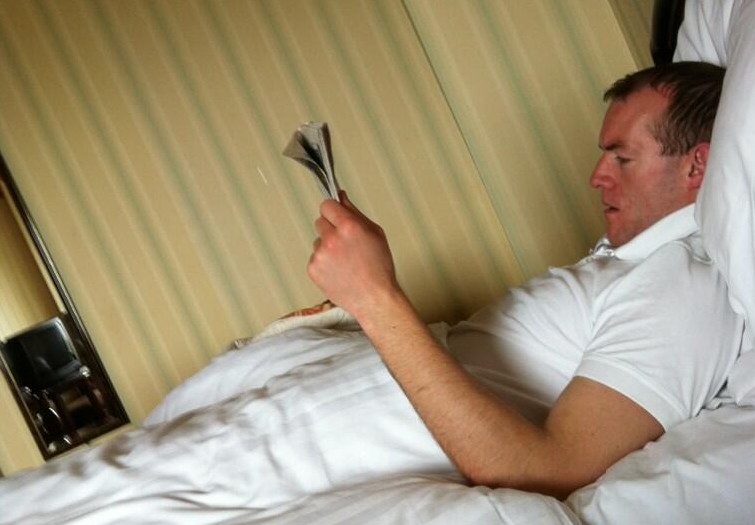

Personal information
- Native name: Niall Ó Gallachóir (Irish)
- Nickname: Big Neil
- Born: 18 August 1982 (age 44) Letterkenny, Ireland
- Occupation: Technician
- Height: 6 ft 4 in (193 cm)

Sport
- Sport: Gaelic football
- Position: Midfield
Club
- Years: Club
- ?–20??: Glenswilly
Club titles
- Donegal titles: 3
Inter-county
Years	County	Apps (scores)
2003–2017	Donegal	140
Inter-county titles
- Ulster titles: 3
- All-Irelands: 1
- NFL: 1
- All Stars: 2

Neil Gallagher (born 18 August 1982) is an Irish former Gaelic footballer who played for Glenswilly and the Donegal county team.

He tended to play for his county at midfield, from 2004 until his injury-enforced retirement in 2017.

He won two All Stars, one All-Ireland Senior Football Championship title, three Ulster Senior Football Championship titles and one National Football League title. He was team captain when Donegal won the National Football League title in 2007. Gallagher's haul of Ulster SFC titles was a joint county team record (alongside such past players as Anthony Molloy, Martin McHugh, Joyce McMullan and Donal Reid) for four years until Patrick McBrearty, Neil McGee, Paddy McGrath, Leo McLoone, Frank McGlynn, Michael Murphy and Anthony Thompson surpassed it in 2018.

== Playing career ==
=== Youth ===
Educated at St Eunan's College in Letterkenny, he warmed the bench during the College's 2000 McLarnon Cup victory.

=== Club ===
Gallagher was part of the Glenswilly team that won the 2011 Donegal Senior Football Championship (his team's first County Championship at senior level). Glenswilly defeated St Michael's by 1–8 to 0–9 in the final. He won his second Donegal Senior Football Championship with Glenswilly in 2013, scoring a goal in the final against Na Cealla Beaga. The team had a successful Ulster campaign, advancing to the final of the 2013 Ulster Senior Club Football Championship, where they lost to Ballinderry.

He won a third Donegal SFC in 2016.

He had retired by 2020.

=== Inter-county ===
Gallagher was first called up to the senior team by Brian McEniff for winter training in 2003. He made his senior debut for Donegal in 2004. That year his team made it to the Ulster final but were defeated by Armagh. 2005 was unsuccessful. Donegal reached the 2006 Ulster Senior Football Championship Final and he played in that match at Croke Park.

In 2007, he was part of the Donegal team that won the county's first National Football League title. Donegal defeated Mayo in the final. He was the caption that day. He sustained a heavy knock to the head, one that required a bandage, but was still able to collect the trophy.

Alongside Glenswilly teammate Ciaran Bonner, he was dropped by manager John Joe Doherty over a breach of discipline ahead of the 2009 All-Ireland SFC qualifier game against Carlow.

By 2011, he had no career and was presumed finished. He was 28 years of age and a peripheral figure in manager Jim McGuinness's first season in charge.

Then, quite suddenly, he became a linchpin of McGuinness's Donegal midfield, winning his first Ulster Senior Football Championship in 2011.

He won his second Ulster SFC title in 2012. Though he did not play in the final against Down, he featured in earlier rounds and contributed a point in the quarter-final victory over Derry. He was then part of the Donegal team that advanced through the 2012 All-Ireland Senior Football Championship. The best performance of his career with Donegal came against Cork at Croke Park in the All-Ireland semi-final; indeed, it is widely regarded as one of the all-time best in team history. He scored a point against Mayo in the 2012 All-Ireland Senior Football Championship final, as Donegal claimed the Sam Maguire Cup. He won an All Star and attended the Football Tour of New York.

He also started for Donegal in the 2014 All-Ireland Senior Football Championship final.

He won his third and final Ulster SFC title in 2014.

Under the management of McGuinness's successor, Rory Gallagher, he continued to feature for his county team. However, he was bedeviled by injuries. On Valentine's Day in 2017, he attended training at Convoy — it was upon the Convoy turf that he broke down for the final time and relinquished his status as an inter-county footballer. Gallagher later described Gallagher as "very disappointed… He wanted to give it a go… He got the back re-scanned and tried to build it up". He announced his retirement from inter-county football at the age of 33 on 20 February 2017.

== Business venture ==
In conjunction with teammate Michael Murphy, Gallagher opened the sports store "Michael Murphy Sports and Leisure" in Letterkenny in August 2014.

== Personal life ==
Less than a week after the 2014 All-Ireland Senior Football Championship final, Gallagher attended the 2014 Ryder Cup in Perthshire, Scotland.

== Honours ==
Donegal

- All-Ireland Senior Football Championship: 2012
- Ulster Senior Football Championship: 2011, 2012, 2014
- National Football League Division 1: 2007 (c.)
- National Football League Division 2: 2011

Glenswilly

- Donegal Senior Football Championship: 2011, 2013
- Donegal Intermediate Football Championship: 2005

Individual

- All Star: 2012, 2014
  - Nominated in 2015
- Donegal News Sports Personality winner: August 2012

Sporting positions
Preceded by Christy Toye	Donegal Senior Captain; 2007	Succeeded by Kevin Cassidy
