= 2017 Donegal Senior Football Championship =

Donegal S.F.C.
- Season: 2017
- Champions: Kilcar (6th title)
- Relegated: Naomh Muire
- Winning Captain: Patrick McBrearty
- Man of the Match: Mark McHugh
- Winning Manager: Barry Doherty
- Matches: ??

The 2017 Donegal Senior Football Championship was the 95th official edition of Donegal GAA's premier Gaelic football tournament for senior graded clubs in County Donegal. Sixteen teams competed, with the winner representing Donegal in the Ulster Senior Club Football Championship.

The championship began with four groups of four, and continued with a knock-out format.

Glenswilly was defending champion after defeating Cill Chartha by a scoreline of 1–10 to 0–12 in the 2016 final.

C. J. Molloy scored a contender for goal of the season against Glenswilly in his club's opening group match, though his club lost. Directly from the second-half throw-in, he soloed through the Glenswilly defence and kicked the ball into the net from a distance of around 25 yards.

This was Burt's debut in the senior grade after winning the 2016 Donegal I.F.C. title.

== Team changes ==
The following teams changed division since the 2016 championship season.

=== To S.F.C. ===
Promoted from 2016 Donegal I.F.C.

- Burt – (I.F.C. Champions)

=== From S.F.C. ===
Relegated to 2017 Donegal I.F.C.

- Glenfin

== Format ==
The 2017 championship took the same format as the 2015 and 2016 championships had, in which there were four groups of four clubs, with the top two clubs qualifying for the quarter-finals. The club finishing bottom in each group contested relegation play-offs to determine which team would be relegated to the 2018 Donegal Intermediate Football Championship.

== Group stage ==
=== Group 1 ===
Team	Pld	W	L	D	PF	PA	PD	Pts
St Michael's	3	3	0	0	66	41	+25	6
Réalt na Mara	3	2	1	0	67	43	+24	4
Malin	3	1	2	0	43	68	-25	2
Seán Mac Cumhaills	3	0	3	0	35	59	-24	0

Round 1

5/7/17	St Michael's	3-9 – 0-13	Seán Mac Cumhaills	MacCumhaill Park; Referee: Connie Doherty (Naomh Conaill)
5/7/17	Colm McFadden 1-3 (0-1f), Martin McElhinney 1-1, Andrew Kelly 1-0, Michael Langan (0-1f) and Daniel McLaughlin 0-2 each, Odhran McFadden 0-1	Report	Stephen Mulligan 0-11 (0-6f), Steven O'Reilly and Martin O'Reilly 0-1 each	MacCumhaill Park; Referee: Connie Doherty (Naomh Conaill)

5/7/17	Réalt na Mara	3-18 – 1-11	Malin	Referee: Mark Brown (Four Masters)
5/7/17	Gary Clancy 0-6 (0-3f), Michael McEniff 1-1, Tommy Hourihane 0-4, Cian McEniff and Timmy Govorov 1-0 each, Diarmuid Spratt 0-3, Alan Russell and Jamie Brennan 0-2 each	Report	Brendan Fildara 0-4 (0-2f), Seamus Houghton 1-0, Joe Doherty 0-2 (0-1f), Declan Walsh, Paul McLaughlin, Stephen McLaughlin, Damien Harkin, Darren Mullarkey 0-1 each	Referee: Mark Brown (Four Masters)

Round 2

8/19/17	Malin	1-13 – 0-11	Seán Mac Cumhaills	Malin; Referee: Andrew Mullin (Killybegs)
8/19/17	Brendan Fildara 1-8 (0-5f), Declan Walsh, Christy Fildara, Matthew Byrne, Sean Kelly, Seamus Doherty 0-1 each	Report	Martin O'Reilly (0-3f) and Stephen Mulligan (0-2f) 0-3 each, Gavin Gallagher, Gary Wilson, Benny McLaughlin, Stephen O'Reilly, Aaron Kelly (0-1f) 0-1 each	Malin; Referee: Andrew Mullin (Killybegs)

8/20/17	St Michael's	1-15 – 2-9	Réalt na Mara	Dunfanaghy; Referee: Enda McFeely (St Mary's Convoy)
8/20/17	Colm McFadden 0-6 (0-5f), Christy Toye 0-3, Andrew Kelly 1-0, Daniel McLaughlin 0-2, Liam Paul Ferry, Oisin Langan, Martin McElhinney, Hugh O'Donnell 0-1 each	Report	Jamie Brennan 2-2, Gary Clancy 0-2 (0-1f), Peter McGonigle, Tommy Hourihane, Christy Keaney, Cian McEniff, Alan Russell 0-1 each	Dunfanaghy; Referee: Enda McFeely (St Mary's Convoy)

Round 3

8/27/17	Malin	1-10 – 6-12	St Michael's	Malin
8/27/17		Report		Malin

8/27/17	Réalt na Mara	2-19 – 1-8	Seán Mac Cumhaills	Bundoran
8/27/17		Report		Bundoran

=== Group 2 ===
Team	Pld	W	L	D	PF	PA	PD	Pts
Na Cealla Beaga	3	2	0	1	41	33	+8	5
Burt	3	2	0	1	36	29	+7	5
Termon	3	1	2	0	31	39	-8	2
Naomh Muire	3	0	3	0	31	38	-7	0

Round 1

5/6/17	Termon	1-12 – 1-10	Naomh Muire	Termon; Referee: Mark Dorrian (Gaeil Fhánada)
5/6/17	Enda McCormick 1-6 (0-2f), Caolan McDaid, Daire McDaid (0-2f), Ricky Gallagher 0-2 each	Report	Paul Yank Boyle 1-2, Shaun Yank Boyle 0-4 (0-2f), Harry Harden 0-2 (0-1f), Brian Gillespie and Paddy McCafferty 0-1 each	Termon; Referee: Mark Dorrian (Gaeil Fhánada)

5/28/17	Burt	0-14 – 0-14	Na Cealla Beaga	Burt; Referee: Liam McConigley (Downings)
5/28/17	Joe Boyle 0-5 (0-4f), Paul McHugh (0-2f) and Ciaran Dowds 0-3 each, Mickey McCann, Conor Harkin, Christopher McDermott	Report	Christopher Murrin 0-5, Hugh McFadden 0-4 (0-3f, 1 '45), Michael Gallagher 0-3, Shane Molloy and Pauric Connaghon 0-1 each	Burt; Referee: Liam McConigley (Downings)

Round 2

8/19/17	Na Cealla Beaga	1-12 – 0-10	Termon	Na Cealla Beaga; Referee: Mark Dorrian (Gaeil Fhanada)
8/19/17	Hugh McFadden 0-6 (0-3f, 2 '45), Evan Broderick 1-1, Christopher Murrin and Daniel Breslin 0-2 each, John Ban Gallagher 0-1	Report	Enda McCormick 0-3 (0-2f), Kevin McDaid and Daire McDaid (0-1f) 0-2 each, Jimmy Gallagher, Caolan McDaid, James McSharry 0-1 each	Na Cealla Beaga; Referee: Mark Dorrian (Gaeil Fhanada)

8/19/17	Naomh Muire	1-6 – 0-11	Burt	The Banks; Referee: Connie Doherty (Naomh Conaill)
8/19/17	Adam O'Brien 1-0, Sean Yank Boyle 0-3 (0-2f), Paul Yank Boyle 0-2 (0-1f), Tommy McHugh 0-1	Report	Joe Boyle 0-4 (0-2f), Paul McHugh and Sean McHugh 0-2 each, Mark Coyle, Stephen Gillespie, Conor Harkin 0-1 each	The Banks; Referee: Connie Doherty (Naomh Conaill)

Round 3

8/27/17	Na Cealla Beaga	0-12 – 0-9	Naomh Muire	Na Cealla Beaga
8/27/17		Report		Na Cealla Beaga

8/27/17	Burt	0-11 – 0-6	Termon	Burt
8/27/17		Report		Burt

=== Group 3 ===
Team	Pld	W	L	D	PF	PA	PD	Pts
Cill Chartha	3	3	0	0	52	36	+16	6
Gaoth Dobhair	3	2	1	0	52	33	+19	4
Glenswilly	3	1	2	0	32	36	-4	2
Ard an Rátha	3	0	3	0	29	60	-31	0

Round 1

5/7/17	Glenswilly	0-15 – 1-7	Ard an Rátha	Glenswilly; Referee: James Connors (St Eunan's)
5/7/17	Gary McFadden (0-2f) and Michael Murphy (0-3f) 0-5 each, Ciaran Bonner 0-4, Neil Gallagher 0-2	Report	C. J. Molloy 1-2 (0-2f), Gareth Concarr 0-3f, Lorcan O'Donnell and Jack Brennan 0-1 each	Glenswilly; Referee: James Connors (St Eunan's)

5/7/17	Cill Chartha	1-15 – 1-12	Gaoth Dobhair	Cill Chartha; Referee: Robbie O'Donnell (Naomh Mhuire)
5/7/17	Stephen McBrearty 0-6, Paddy McBrearty 1-2 (1-0 pen, 0-1f), Conor Doherty 0-2, Eoin McHugh, Ciaran McGinley, Michael Hegarty, Andrew McClean, Ryan McHugh (0-1f) 0-1 each	Report	Odhrán Mac Niallais 0-4 (0-2f), Odhran Ferry 1-0, Gavin McBride 0-3 (0-1f), Niall Friel, Eamonn McGee, Naoise Ó Baoill, Daire Ó Baoill, Michael Carroll 0-1 each	Cill Chartha; Referee: Robbie O'Donnell (Naomh Mhuire)

Round 2

8/20/17	Gaoth Dobhair	1-7 – 0-5	Glenswilly	Gaoth Dobhair; Referee: Jimmy White (Killybegs)
8/20/17	James Carroll 0-5 (0-4f), Cian Mulligan 1-0, Daire Ó Baoill and Eamonn Collum 0-1 each	Report	Gary McFadden 0-2 (0-1f), Michael Murphy, Caolan Kelly, Caoimhín Marley 0-1 each	Gaoth Dobhair; Referee: Jimmy White (Killybegs)

8/20/17	Ard an Rátha	1-6 – 3-9	Kilcar	Ard an Rátha; Referee: Seamus McGonigle (Aodh Ruadh)
8/20/17	John Ross Molloy 1-1, Gareth Concarr 0-3f, CJ Molloy and Lorcan O'Donnell (1 '45) 0-1 each	Report	Paddy McBrearty 2-2 (0-1f), Eoin McHugh 1-1, Padraig Carr, Mark McHugh, Mark Sweeney, Brian O'Donnell, Conor Doherty, Ashley Carr 0-1 each	Ard an Rátha; Referee: Seamus McGonigle (Aodh Ruadh)

Round 3

8/27/17	Gaoth Dobhair	2-21 – 1-7	Ard an Rátha	Gaoth Dobhair
8/27/17		Report		Gaoth Dobhair

8/27/17	Cill Chartha	0-16 – 1-9	Glenswilly	Cill Chartha
8/27/17		Report		Cill Chartha

=== Group 4 ===
Team	Pld	W	L	D	PF	PA	PD	Pts
St Eunan's	3	3	0	0	52	27	+25	6
Naomh Conaill	3	2	1	0	40	41	-1	4
An Clochán Liath	3	1	2	0	37	43	-6	2
Four Masters	3	0	3	0	32	50	-18	0

Round 1

5/7/17	St Eunan's	1-21 – 0-8	Four Masters	Pairc Tír Conaill; Referee: Enda McFeely (St. Mary's Convoy)
5/7/17	Niall O'Donnell 0-8 (0-6f), John Haran 1-2, Patrick McGowan 0-4, Michael Miller 0-2, Conor Morrison, Eamonn Doherty, Caolan Ward, Rory Kavanagh, Conor Gibbons 0-1 each	Report	Leo McHugh 0-3, Emmet Doogan and Thomas McGowan (0-2f) 0-2 each, Kevin McBrearty 0-1	Pairc Tír Conaill; Referee: Enda McFeely (St. Mary's Convoy)

5/7/17	Naomh Conaill	2-11 – 1-12	An Clochán Liath	An Clochán Liath; Referee: Mark Dorrian (Gaeil Fhánada)
5/7/17	Kieran Gallagher and Logan Quinn 1-0 each, John O'Malley (0-1f), Brendan McDyer, Dermot Molloy (0-3f) 0-3 each, Eoin Waide and Leon Thompson 0-1 each	Report	Conor Greene 1-2 (0-1f), Noel McBride 0-3 (0-1f), Adam Neely (0-1f) and Shaun Sharkey (0-1f) 0-2 each, Corey Gallagher, Darren Curran, Ryan Greene 0-1 each	An Clochán Liath; Referee: Mark Dorrian (Gaeil Fhánada)

Round 2

8/20/17	Naomh Conaill	1-9 – 0-11	Four Masters	Glenties; Referee: Andrew Mullin (Killybegs)
8/20/17	Brendan McDyer 1-2, Ciarán Thompson 0-4, Dermot Molloy, Marty Doyle, Seamus Corcoran 0-1 each	Report	Thomas McGowan 0-4 (0-2f, 1 '45), Shaun Meehan 0-2 (0-1f), Karl Lacey, Kevin McBrearty, Leo McHugh, Caolan Loughney, Paddy Reid 0-1 each	Glenties; Referee: Andrew Mullin (Killybegs)

8/20/17	St Eunan's	0-13 – 0-8	An Clochán Liath	O'Donnell Park; Referee: Shaun McLaughlin (Malin)
8/20/17	Conor Gibbons 0-5, Rory Kavanagh 0-4, Niall O'Donnell 0-2 (0-1f), Caolan Ward and Darragh Mulgrew 0-1 each	Report	Ryan Greene 0-4 (0-3f), Cory Gallagher 0-2, Gerard Walsh and Conor Greene (0-1f) 0-1 each	O'Donnell Park; Referee: Shaun McLaughlin (Malin)

Round 3

8/27/17	St Eunan's	0-15 – 1-8	Naomh Conaill	O'Donnell Park
8/27/17		Report		O'Donnell Park

8/27/17	An Clochán Liath	1-11 – 0-13	Four Masters	Páirc Tír Conaill
8/27/17		Report		Páirc Tír Conaill

== Knockout stage ==
=== Last Eight ===
Quarter-finals		Semi-finals		Final
Cill Chartha	1-20
Réalt na Mara	1-9	Cill Chartha	2-16
St Michael's	0-13	St Michael's	0-7
Burt	1-8			Cill Chartha	0-7
Naomh Conaill	2-13			Naomh Conaill	0-4
Na Cealla Beaga	0-15	Naomh Conaill	1-13
Gaoth Dobhair	2-12	Gaoth Dobhair	1-12
St Eunan's	0-16

=== Quarter-finals ===
9 September 2017; 6:00 pm Quarter-final	St Michael's	0-13 – 1-8	Burt	O'Donnell Park; Referee: Jimmy White (Killybegs)
9 September 2017; 6:00 pm Quarter-final	Colm McFadden (0-3f) and Andrew Kelly (0-1f) 0-4 each, Oisín Langan, Liam Paul Ferry, Daniel McLaughlin, Christy Toye, Hugh O'Donnell 0-1 each	Report	Paul McHugh (1 '45) and Joe Boyle (0-3f) 0-3 each, Conor Harkin 1-0, Mickey McCann and Ciaran Dowds 0-1 each	O'Donnell Park; Referee: Jimmy White (Killybegs)

9 September 2017; 7:30 pm Quarter-final	Naomh Conaill	2-13 – 0-15	Cill Chartha	Ard an Rátha; Referee: Robert O'Donnell (Naomh Mhuire)
9 September 2017; 7:30 pm Quarter-final	Dermot Molloy 1-3 (0-1f), Eoghan McGettigan 1-2, John O'Malley 0-4 (0-2f), Anthony Thompson 0-2, Ciarán Thompson and Brendan McDyer 0-1 each	Report	Hugh McFadden 0-12 (0-11f), Daniel Breslin, John Ban Gallgher, Evan Broderick 0-1 each	Ard an Rátha; Referee: Robert O'Donnell (Naomh Mhuire)

10 September 2017; 2:00 pm Quarter-final	Cill Chartha	1-20 – 1-9	Réalt na Mara	MacCumhaill Park; Referee: Enda McFeely (St Mary's Convoy); Man of the Match: Paddy McBrearty
10 September 2017; 2:00 pm Quarter-final	Paddy McBrearty 0-8 (0-4f), Ryan McHugh 1-4 (0-2f, 1 '45), Ciaran McGinley, Eoin McHugh, Stephen McBrearty 0-2 each, Brian O'Donnell and Mark McHugh 0-1 each	Report	Christy Keaney 1-2 (1-0 pen), Gary Clancy 0-4 (0-2f, 1 '45), Alan Russell 0-2, Ciaran McCaughey 0-1	MacCumhaill Park; Referee: Enda McFeely (St Mary's Convoy); Man of the Match: Paddy McBrearty

10 September 2017; 4:00 pm Quarter-final	Gaoth Dobhair	2-12 – 0-16	St Eunan's	MacCumhaill Park; Referee: Shaun McLaughlin (Malin); Man of the Match: Cian Mulligan
10 September 2017; 4:00 pm Quarter-final	James Carroll 0-6 (0-4f), Cian Mulligan 1-2, Daire Ó Baoill 1-0, Jamie Reynolds, Christopher McFadden, Noel Kelly, Eamonn Collum 0-1 each	Report	Niall O'Donnell 0-9 (0-5f), Caolan Ward and Cillian Morrison 0-2 each, Conor Parke, Darragh Mulgrew, Sean McVeigh 0-1 each	MacCumhaill Park; Referee: Shaun McLaughlin (Malin); Man of the Match: Cian Mulligan

=== Semi-finals ===
23 September 2017; 7:30 pm Semi-final	Cill Chartha	2-16 – 0-7	St Michael's	MacCumhaill Park; Referee: Robbie O'Donnell (Naomh Mhuire); Man of the Match: Ryan McHugh
23 September 2017; 7:30 pm Semi-final	Ryan McHugh 2-3 (0-1f), Ciaran McGinley, Stephen McBrearty, Eoin McHugh 0-3 each, Paddy McBrearty 0-2f, Mark McHugh and Mark Sweeney 0-1 each	Report	Colm McFadden 0-2 (0-1f), Michael Gallagher, Ciaran Gallagher, Liam Paul Ferry, Andrew Kelly, Brian McLaughlin 0-1 each	MacCumhaill Park; Referee: Robbie O'Donnell (Naomh Mhuire); Man of the Match: Ryan McHugh

30 September 2017; 7:30 pm Semi-final	Naomh Conaill	1-13 – 1-12	Gaoth Dobhair	MacCumhaill Park; Referee: Seamus McGonigle (Aodh Ruadh); Man of the Match: Leo McLoone
30 September 2017; 7:30 pm Semi-final	Eoghan McGettigan 0-5 (0-4f), John O'Malley 0-4, Kieran Gallagher 1-0, Ciarán Thompson and Dermot Molloy 0-2 each	Report	Michael Carroll 1-1, Odhran MacNiallais 0-4 (0-2f), James Carroll 0-3 (0-2f), Niall Friel, Cian Mulligan, Daire O'Baoill, Gavin McBride (0-1f) 0-1 each	MacCumhaill Park; Referee: Seamus McGonigle (Aodh Ruadh); Man of the Match: Leo McLoone

=== Final ===
15 October 2017; 4:00 pm Final	Cill Chartha	0-7 – 0-4	Naomh Conaill	MacCumhaill Park; Attendance: 6,930; Referee: Enda McFeely (St Mary's Convoy); Man of the Match: Sean McMonagle
15 October 2017; 4:00 pm Final	Paddy McBrearty 0-3 (0-2f), Ryan McHugh, Michael Hegarty, Mark McHugh, Conor Doherty 0-1 each	Report	Dermot Molloy 0-2f, Ciarán Thompson and Eunan Doherty 0-1 each	MacCumhaill Park; Attendance: 6,930; Referee: Enda McFeely (St Mary's Convoy); Man of the Match: Sean McMonagle

== Relegation play-offs ==
=== Relegation semi-finals ===
24 September 2017
2:00 pm
Relegation semi-final

Seán Mac Cumhaills	1-14 – 1-13	Naomh Muire

Dunfanaghy
Referee: Jimmy White
7 October 2017
3:00 pm
Relegation semi-final

Four Masters	4-8 – 2-9	Ard an Rátha

Na Cealla Beaga
Referee: Jimmy White

=== Relegation final ===
28 October 2017
3:00 pm
Relegation final

Ard an Rátha	0-13 – 2-7	Naomh Muire

Glenties
Referee: Connie Doherty
18 November 2017
2:00 pm
Relegation final replay

Ard an Rátha	5-14 – 1-9	Naomh Muire

Glenties

== Gradam Shéamuis Mhic Géidigh ==
Mark McHugh was named as the recipient of the annual Gradam Shéamuis Mhic Géidigh.
