= 2013 International Rules Series =

- Event: International Rules Series
Ireland	Australia
173	72
- 173–72 on aggregate, Ireland win series 2–0

First test
Ireland	Australia
57	35
- Date: 19 October 2013
- Venue: Breffni Park, Cavan, County Cavan
- Referee: Maurice Deegan (Ire); Matt Stevic (Aus)
- Attendance: 17,657 (32,000 capacity)

Second test
Australia	Ireland
37	116
- Date: 26 October 2013
- Venue: Croke Park, Dublin, County Dublin
- Referee: Maurice Deegan (Ire); Matt Stevic (Aus)
- Attendance: 28,525 (82,300 capacity)

The 2013 International Rules Series (officially the 2013 Irish Daily Mail International Rules Series) was the 17th International Rules Series contested between Gaelic footballers from Ireland and Australian footballers from Australia. Ireland entered the 2013 series as defending champions, whilst Australia were, for the first time in the series, represented by an exclusively Indigenous team, known as the Indigenous All-Stars.

The series was played over two Test matches, with Ireland winning both Test matches to take the series 2–0 and achieve a record aggregate win of 173–72 points. The Gaelic Athletic Association announced the schedule for the series in February 2013, with Breffni Park in Cavan chosen for the first Test match and Croke Park in Dublin chosen to host the second Test match. It marked just the second time that an international rules match was played in Cavan, or for that matter at a venue situated in the jurisdiction of the Ulster GAA. Breffni Park had previously hosted the first Test in the 2006 Ladies' International Rules Series.

== Broadcast and sponsorship ==
The GAA announced as part of their management team selection in March 2013 that the Irish Daily Mail newspaper would return as Irish team and series sponsor whilst Irish-language TV network TG4 would again be the official broadcaster of the series in Ireland. In making the announcement, GAA President Liam O'Neill stated that “TG4 [and the Irish Daily Mail] are...valued long term partners of the GAA and we are looking forward to working with them to bring the games to the widest audience possible.” As part of their live coverage of the two Test matches, TG4 announced they would also provide replays of previous international rules matches in September and October for Irish audiences.

The AFL announced as part of their extended squad selection in August 2013 that Australian supermarket chain Coles and Indigenous health and wellbeing group National Aboriginal Community Controlled Health Organisation (NACCHO) would be the official partners of the Indigenous All-Stars. Both groups were featured on the newly designed team guernsey. Australian free-to-air TV network 7mate was the exclusive broadcaster of the series in Australia, showing both matches on a slight delay and replaying them as well.

== Background ==
=== Irish management and captain ===
In February 2013, the GAA confirmed that former Roscommon footballer Paul Earley would succeed Anthony Tohill as manager of the Irish team. GAA President Liam O'Neill said the Association was "delighted that someone of the standing and calibre of Paul Earley will lead the Irish challenge" and praised his extensive experience in both international rules and Australian football, Earley having represented Ireland in the 1987 series and played briefly for the Melbourne Football Club in 1984. Earley announced his management team in March, appointing Séamus McCarthy (Tipperary), Jarlath Fallon (Galway) and Tony Scullion (Derry) as selectors and former Cavan footballer and current GWS Giants high-performance manager Nicholas Walsh as conditioning coach. On October 3, Earley announced that former All-Ireland Donegal captain Michael Murphy would be captain of the Irish side for the series. This created a headache for young Murphy, as the Series was scheduled to clash with the final of the 2013 Donegal Senior Football Championship, which his club Glenswilly contested. On October 8, Earley announced an Irish squad of 29, with 15 of the national counties being represented in the side. This number of counties represented was reduced to 11 when Earley named his final 23-man match-day squad for the first Test in Cavan. Despite having a club county final scheduled the following day, captain Michael Murphy was named as a starting player. Ahead of the second test, former Irish vice-captain Ciarán McKeever and veteran Kildare footballer Johnny Doyle were included in the squad, replacing the injured Finian Hanley and Mayo footballer Aidan O'Shea, who had club commitments.

=== Australian Indigenous team ===
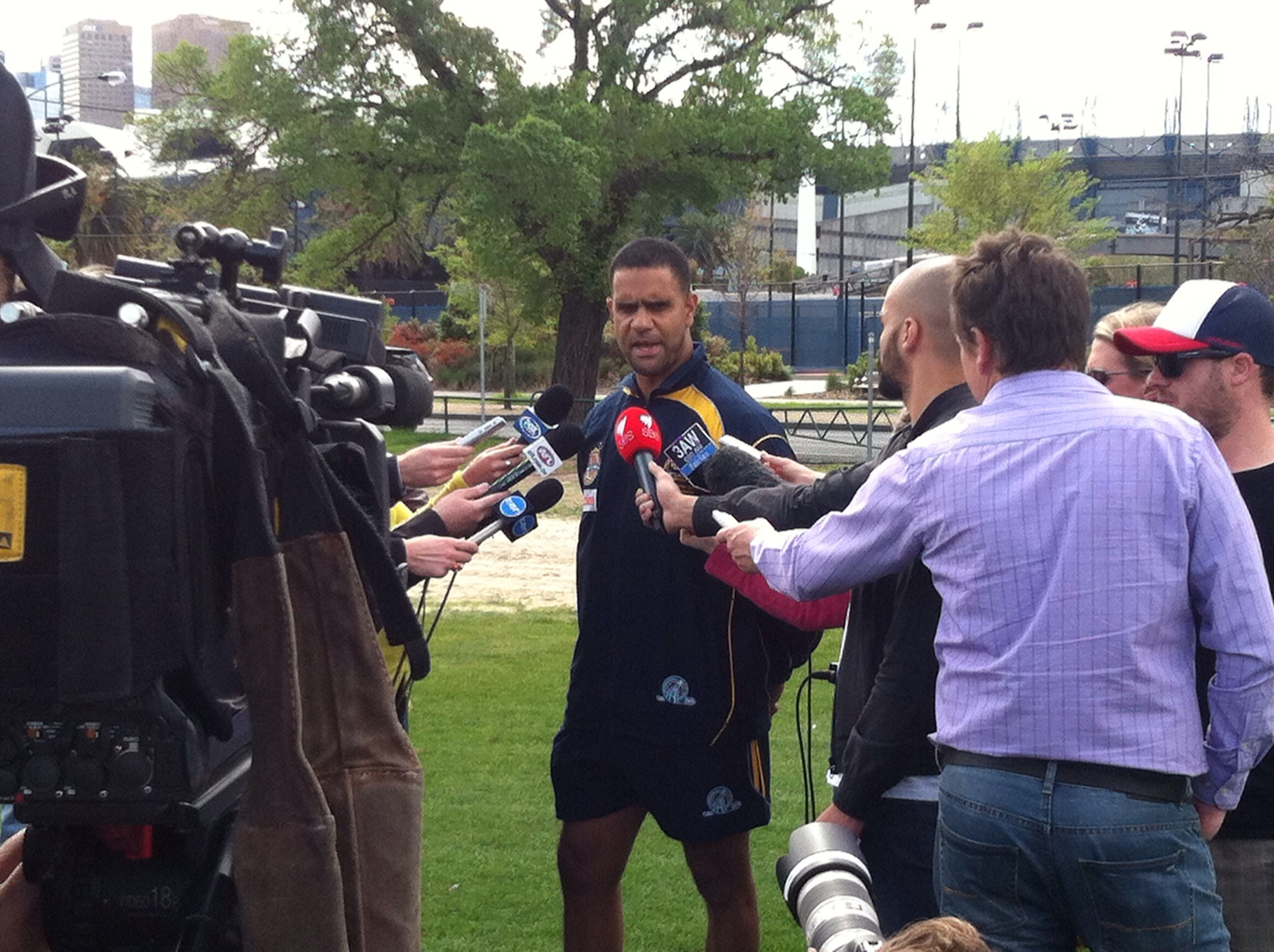
Australian coach Michael O'Loughlin at a media press conference ahead of a team training session at Gosch's Paddock, Melbourne

In May 2013, AFL CEO Andrew Demetriou confirmed to Channel 9's The Footy Show that the AFL was considering the possibility of sending an all-Indigenous team made up of exclusively Aboriginal footballers to Ireland for the 2013 series. Previously, an all-Indigenous team made up of some of the best such players in the AFL has competed in pre-season exhibition matches in the Northern Territory to relatively little public exposure. In late May, respected sports journalist Caroline Wilson penned an article in The Age claiming that the plan now "seemed certain" as a result of support from star Indigenous players Adam Goodes and Lance Franklin. The decision was made official in July, when the AFL announced that the Indigenous All-Stars would indeed represent Australia, with Deputy CEO Gillon McLachlan justifying the move by contending that the series needed reinvigoration and that the commitment of senior indigenous players had been significant in forming the new concept.

The AFL announced a 33-man extended squad on 29 August, which included high-profile names such as Daniel Wells and Shaun Burgoyne alongside multiple All-Australian winners Franklin and Goodes; however, on October 8, the squad was trimmed to a touring party of 21 and featured a rather makeshift lineup of both high-profile Indigenous players and several lesser-known players who were not included in the original squad Lance Franklin, who would otherwise have been captain, was ruled out of the second Test due to commitments in Australia. Paddy Ryder may be a late inclusion in the team. – including two players who had never previously played a senior level AFL game.

Daniel Wells was the Australian captain; Aaron Davey was vice-captain. Former Sydney Swans and Indigenous player Michael O'Loughlin coached and managed the team, with former Australian coach Rodney Eade, former senior AFL and GAA player Tadhg Kennelly, and ex–Adelaide Crows and Indigenous player Andrew McLeod joining him on the panel. Prior to the opening Test, the Australian side defeated a combined Dublin universities team by a score of 62–23.

== Squads ==
- Coach: Paul Earley (Roscommon)

Ireland
Name	Team	Club
23. Michael Murphy (c)	Donegal	Glenswilly
28. Aidan Walsh (vc)	Cork	Kanturk
1. Paddy O'Rourke (gk)	Meath	Skryne
2. Colm Begley	Laois	Stradbally
3. Colm Boyle	Mayo	Davitts
4. Ciarán Byrne	Louth	St. Mochta's
5. Seán Cavanagh	Tyrone	Moy
6. Paul Conroy	Galway	St James'
7. Johnny Doyle**	Kildare	Allenwood
8. Paul Flynn	Dublin	Fingallians
9. Finian Hanley**	Galway	Salthill-Knocknacarra
12. Lee Keegan	Mayo	Westport
13. Ciarán Kilkenny	Dublin	Castleknock
14. Patrick McBrearty	Donegal	Kilcar
15. Jack McCaffrey	Dublin	Clontarf
17. Neil McGee	Donegal	Gaoth Dobhair
18. Chrissy McKaigue	Derry	Slaughtneil
19. Ciarán McKeever**	Armagh	Cullyhanna
20. Kevin McLoughlin	Mayo	Knockmore
21. Conor McManus	Monaghan	Clontibret
22. Ross Munnelly	Laois	Arles/Kilcruise
24. Aidan O'Shea**	Mayo	Breaffy
25. Ciarán Sheehan	Cork	Éire Óg
26. Michael Shields	Cork	St. Finbarr's
27. Zach Tuohy	Carlton & Laois	Portlaoise

- Coach: Michael O'Loughlin (Sydney)

Australia
Name	Team
3. Steven Motlop	Geelong
5. Jarrod Harbrow	Gold Coast
7. Leroy Jetta	Essendon
8. Daniel Wells (c)	North Melbourne
9. Ashley McGrath (gk)	Brisbane Lions
12. Lindsay Thomas	North Melbourne
13. Chris Yarran	Carlton
14. Tony Armstrong	Sydney
15. Lewis Jetta	Sydney
19. Eddie Betts	Adelaide
21. Sharrod Wellingham	West Coast
22. Shaun Edwards	Greater Western Sydney
23. Lance Franklin**	Sydney
27. Mathew Stokes	Geelong
28. Cam Ellis-Yolmen†	Adelaide
29. Alwyn Davey	Essendon
32. Jake Neade	Port Adelaide
33. Josh Hill	West Coast
34. Dom Barry†	Melbourne
36. Aaron Davey (vc)	Melbourne
42. Nathan Lovett-Murray	Essendon

†These players have never played a senior AFL game prior to this series
**These players participated in only one of the two test matches

== Series results ==
	2013 International Rules series – Test 1
Saturday 19 October 7:00pm (IST)	Ireland	def.	Australia	Breffni Park, Cavan (Crowd: 17,657)	Report
	0.5.2 (17); 0.8.4 (28); 1.9.6 (39); 2.12.9 (57)	Q1; Q2; Q3; Final	0.1.1 (4); 0.2.3 (9); 1.5.6 (27); 1.7.8 (35)	Umpires: Maurice Deegan (Ire) & Matt Stevic (Aus); Television broadcast: TG4 (Ire); 7mate (Aus)
Tuohy, McLoughlin		Goals	Neade
Murphy (2), Munnelly (2); Begley, Byrne, O'Shea, Cavanagh; Flynn, Sheehan, Boyle, McManus		Overs	Motlop (2); Thomas, Lewis Jetta, Stokes, Leroy Jetta, Franklin
Tuohy, McCaffrey, Murphy, Hanley, McManus, Munnelly		Best	Motlop, McGrath, Wells, Stokes, Franklin, Betts, Yarran
Walsh (Knee)		Injuries	None
None		Reports	None
Ireland lead series by 22 points on aggregate; Irish Man of the Match: Ross Munnelly

2013 International Rules series – Test 2
Saturday 26 October 7:00pm (IST)	Ireland	def.	Australia	Croke Park, Dublin (Crowd: 28,525)	Report
2.4.3 (27); 3.10.5 (53); 4.15.9 (78); 6.22.14 (116)	Q1; Q2; Q3; Final	0.2.2 (8); 0.4.4 (16); 0.7.4 (25); 2.7.4 (37)	Umpires: Maurice Deegan (Ire) & Matt Stevic (Aus); Television broadcast: TG4 (Ire); 7mate (Aus)
McManus 2, McCaffrey, Kilkenny, McBreaty, Begley	Goals	Betts, Neade
Murphy 4, McManus 4, Sheehan 3, Keegan 3, Munnelly 2, McBrearty 1, McKaigue, Flynn, Kilkenny, Cavanagh, Shields	Overs	Betts 2, Wellingham, Lew. Jetta, Al. Davey, Thomas, Hill
Murphy, McManus, Sheehan, Tuohy, Keegan, McBrearty	Best	Motlop, Betts, Lewis Jetta, Armstrong
Boyle (concussion)	Injuries	None
Ireland win series 173–72 on aggregate; Irish Man of the Match: Conor McManus; Jim Stynes Medal (Australia): Ashley McGrath; GAA Medal - Player of the Series (Ireland): Ciarán Sheehan

== See also ==
- International rules football
- Gaelic football
- Australian rules football
- Indigenous All-Stars
- Relationship between Gaelic football and Australian rules football
