= Gary McFadden =

Irish Gaelic footballer

Personal information
- Nickname: Copper
- Born: 1980s County Donegal, Ireland

Sport
- Sport: Gaelic football
- Position: Defender
Club
- Years: Club
- ?–: Glenswilly
Club titles
- Donegal titles: 3
- Ulster titles: 0
Inter-county
- Years: County
- 2011–201?: Donegal

Gary 'Copper' McFadden (born 1980s) is an Irish Gaelic footballer who plays for Glenswilly and also, formerly, for the Donegal county team.

He was a panel member when Donegal won the 2012 All-Ireland Senior Football Championship.

He normally plays as a midfielder or half forward.

== Early life ==
McFadden was educated at St Eunan's College in Letterkenny. Manus McFadden, so crucial in the foundation of Glenswilly's GAA club, is his uncle, as he is also the uncle of Glenswilly player Kealan McFadden.

== Playing career ==
=== Club ===
McFadden captained Glenswilly to their first Donegal Senior Football Championship in 2011, with a 1–8 to 0–9 victory over St Michael's. He was also captain when the team reached the 2007 County Final and lost. McFadden won his second Donegal Senior Football Championship with Glenswilly in 2013 (he was not captain then). His team progressed to the final of the Ulster Senior Club Football Championship, which they lost to Ballinderry.

He won a third Donegal SFC in 2016.

=== Inter-county ===
McFadden was first called up the Donegal senior team in December 2007, he made his debut in a home victory against the 2007 All Ireland champions Kerry in a league match played in Ballybofey in early 2008.

He was called into the panel again ahead of the 2012 Dr McKenna Cup. He was a member of the Donegal panel that won the 2012 All-Ireland Senior Football Championship Final against Mayo. He made a substitute appearance in the 2013 National Football League game against Kerry, an easy win in Ballybofey.

Three days after the 2014 National Football League Division 2 Final against Monaghan at Croke Park, it was confirmed that McFadden was one of four players to have left the Donegal county panel, less than a month before the county's Ulster Championship game against Derry. In December 2014, it was reported that McFadden had returned to the Donegal set-up after opting out in 2013.

He was still playing for Donegal as of 2015.

== Honours ==
Donegal

- All-Ireland Senior Football Championship: 2012
- Ulster Senior Football Championship: 2012

Glenswilly

- Donegal Senior Football Championship: 2011, 2013, 2016
