= C. J. Molloy =

American Gaelic footballer (born 1989)

Personal information
- Native name: C. J. Ó Maolmhuaidh (Irish)
- Nickname: Big Ceej
- Born: 1988 or 1989 (age 36–37)
- Occupation: Legal executive

Sport
- Sport: Gaelic football
- Position: Forward
Clubs
- Years: Club
- 200?–2014 2014–: Donegal New York; Ard an Rátha
College(s)
- Years: College
- 2007–2011 2012–2014: Union College; Iona College
Inter-county
- Years: County
- 2008–2013 2014–2015: New York; Donegal
Inter-county titles
- All-Irelands: has one all Ireland with New York beating Kilkenny by one point and kicking a free over the bar

C. J. Molloy (born 1989) is an American sportsperson. As a Gaelic footballer he has played for New York in the All-Ireland Senior Football Championship.

== Early life and education ==
Son of Connie Molloy, a manager of and former player with the New York team, he is a native of Hawthorne, which is about thirty miles north of Manhattan. He is the nephew of Anthony Molloy, the 1992 All-Ireland winning captain. As a boy he spent summers in Donegal, Galway and Tralee.

Molloy received a basketball scholarship from Union College located three and a half hours away. However, he returned to the Bronx three times each week for football training. He ultimately gave up basketball after a few months to concentrate on his football.

He studied at Union College between 2007 and 2011, completing a Bachelor of Arts degree in Political Science and Government. He completed a Master of Business Administration in Management at Iona College between 2012 and 2014.

== Playing career ==
Molloy played for New York teams in the All-Ireland Feile Under-14 competitions in 2002 in Carlow and in 2003 in Galway.

Molloy made his New York senior debut in 2008 in a game against Leitrim. He was sent off in 2013 as New York exited the Championship against Leitrim, who were returning to the Bronx for the first time since then.

He played in the 2012 All Stars match and scored a goal. He met Donegal manager Jim McGuinness, there with the team; McGuinness invited Molloy to Donegal.

Molloy flew to Donegal. He participated with the Donegal county team from his arrival in mid-February 2014, but parted from them in 2015 struggling with injuries.

When Molloy moved to Ireland, he went to play for his uncle's club, Ard an Rátha. He had never played for them until this time. He has been club captain.

In 2016, Molloy appeared in a Street Gaelic football video — Peil Star 2 — with Dublin players Shane Carthy and Diarmuid Connolly. In the video, Connolly kicks a football across the River Liffey in Dublin.

He scored a contender for goal of the season against reigning Senior Football Champions Glenswilly in 2017, though his team lost the match. Directly from the second-half throw-in, he soloed through the Glenswilly defence and kicked the ball into the net from a distance of around 25 yards.

He was at McCann Fitzgerald between April 2016 and February 2018 when he moved to the Sanne group. He spent the period between September 2015 and March 2016 at Maples and Calder in Dublin, having before that been at Wilson Esler between 2011 and 2013.

He has sustained a cruciate injury.
