= Brian McLaughlin =

Brian McLaughlin may refer to:

- Brian McLaughlin (footballer, born 1954) (1954–2009), Scottish footballer and coach
- Brian McLaughlin (footballer, born 1974), former footballer
- Brian McLaughlin (Gaelic footballer), Irish sportsperson who represented Donegal
- Brian J. McLaughlin (born c. 1957), former Boston City Council member
- Brian M. McLaughlin (born 1952), former American Democratic politician from Flushing, Queens
