= Johnny Doyle (Gaelic footballer) =

Allenwood and Kildare Gaelic footballer

Personal information
- Born: 30 January 1978 (age 48) Allen, County Kildare
- Height: 6 ft 2 in (188 cm)

Sport
- Sport: Gaelic football
- Position: Corner forward
Club
- Years: Club
- 1995– present: Allenwood
Inter-county
Years	County	Apps (scores)
2000–2014	Kildare	67 (8–258)
Inter-county titles
- Leinster titles: 1
- All Stars: 1

Johnny Doyle is a Gaelic footballer who played for Allenwood and, formerly, at senior level for the Kildare county team.

== Playing career ==
Doyle has won one Agricultural Colleges All-Ireland. He has won an All-Ireland Cross Country Athletic College medal and won several boxing medals. Doyle also more recently has taken up a managerial role with the Maynooth Sigerson first team.

=== Club ===
Doyle plays his club football for Allenwood and was awarded Kildare Footballer of the Year in 2004 and 2005. He won the Kildare Senior Football Championship with Allenwood in 2004. Doyle and Allenwood's form continued in 2006 with a Kildare Senior Football Championship final appearance against Moorefield.

He did not miss a championship match for his club between his debut in 1995 and 2022 (when he had an injury) and started every championship match for his club between 2000 and 2013.

=== Inter-county ===
Doyle won one Leinster Senior Football Championship medal with Kildare in 2000 and a Kildare Under-21 county title. He was all round top scorer in the 2008 and 2010 Championships. Doyle was named as a 2010 Vodafone GAA football All Star for his performances with Kildare in the 2010 Championship. In 2012 Doyle captained Kildare to the National Football League Division 2 title with a win over Tyrone. In 2012 and 2013 he was on the Kildare team to win the O'Byrne Cup. Doyle announced his retirement from inter-county football on 6 April 2014, at the age of 36. On his retirement Doyle had appeared 154 times for his county over a 15-year span.

In 2019, at the age of 41, he made a surprise return to the inter-county game when he joined the Kildare junior team.

=== International rules ===
Doyle was called up for the 2013 International Rules Series as a replacement for Aidan O'Shea ahead of the second Test. He played for Ireland against Australia at Croke Park and won the Series.

== Post-playing career ==
Involved in the Kildare backroom team of Glenn Ryan from October 2021.

== Career statistics ==
As of 6 April 2014

Appearances and scores by team, season and competition
Team	Season	National League			Leinster		All-Ireland		Total	
Team	Season	Division	Apps	Score	Apps	Score	Apps	Score	Apps	Score
Kildare	2000				5	0-09	1	0-00	6	0-09
Kildare	2001				2	0-03	2	0-06	4	0-09
Kildare	2002				4	0-11	1	0-04	5	0-15
Kildare	2003				3	0-12	1	0-02	4	0-14
Kildare	2004				1	0-02	1	0-08	2	0-10
Kildare	2005				3	0-15	1	1-02	4	1-17
Kildare	2006				1	0-06	2	0-09	3	0-15
Kildare	2007				1	0-04	2	2-12	3	2-16
Kildare	2008				1	0-02	4	2-24	5	2-26
Kildare	2009				4	0-16	2	0-11	6	0-27
Kildare	2010				1	0-09	7	1-40	8	1-49
Kildare	2011				3	0-09	4	2-12	7	2-21
Kildare	2012				2	0-05	4	0-06	6	0-11
Kildare	2013				2	0-08	2	0-11	4	0-19
Kildare	2014				Retired after the league					
Total					33	0-111	34	8-147	67	8-258

== Honours ==
Inter-county

- 1 Leinster Senior Football Championship (2000)
- 1 National Football League Division 2 (2012 [c])

International

- 1 International Rules Series (2013)

Club

- 1 Kildare Senior Football Championship (2004)
- 1 Kildare Intermediate Football Championship (2023)
- 1 Leinster Intermediate Club Football Championship (2023)
- 2 Kildare Senior Football League Division 1s (2002, 2004)

Individual

- 4 Kildare Senior Player of the Years (2004, 2005, 2008, 2010)
- 1 All Stars Award (2010)
