= Shane McCormack =

Irish Gaelic footballer

Personal information
- Born: September 19, 1985 (age 41) Allenwood, County Kildare

Sport
- Sport: Gaelic football
- Position: Goalkeeper
Club
- Years: Club
- ? Present: Allenwood
Inter-county
- Years: County
- 2009-2011: Kildare

Shane McCormack is a Gaelic footballer for Kildare. He plays his club football for Allenwood.
