= James Pat McDaid =

Personal information
- Born: 1980s County Donegal, Ireland

Sport
- Sport: Gaelic football
- Position: Defender
Club
- Years: Club
- 2000s – 2010s: Glenswilly
Club titles
- Donegal titles: 2

James Pat McDaid (born 1980s) is an Irish sportsman and politician. A Gaelic footballer, he has played for and captained the Glenswilly senior team.

Born to James and Peggy (née McDermott of Termon), McDaid has four siblings: Barry, Nicola, Aisling and Mark. He grew up at Glenkeeragh, Glenswilly, attended Glenswilly National School and St Eunan's College in Letterkenny, then studied Sustainable Building Technology at Institute of Technology, Sligo.

McDaid has won two Donegal Senior Football Championships (2011 and 2013). He scored a point in the 2011 final and captained the team during the 2013 final. Then on they went to the Ulster club final and a Division 2 League title. He kept Sean Quigley scoreless in the Ulster semi-final.

McDaid injured a cruciate ligament in his knee while playing in America in 2008 and had to have two cartilage operations on his bones.

McDaid is also a politician, representing the Fianna Fáil party. He is a carpenter from a farming background. He became Mayor of Letterkenny Municipal District in June 2016.

He married his bride Teresa over the festive period of 2017–18.

== Honours ==
Player

- 2 Donegal Senior Football Championships (2011, 2013)
