= Daniel McLaughlin =

Irish Gaelic footballer (born 1990)

Personal information
- Born: 1990 (age 35–36)
- Occupation: Student
- Height: 5 ft 11 in (180 cm)

Sport
- Sport: Gaelic football
Club
- Years: Club
- 20??–: St Michael's
Inter-county
- Years: County
- 2011?–201?: Donegal

Daniel McLaughlin (born 1990) is an Irish Gaelic footballer who plays for St Michael's and also, formerly, for the Donegal county team.

With his club, he has emerged from the shadows of the more experienced forwards Colm McFadden and Christy Toye to stake his place on the team. McLaughlin's club reached the final of the 2011 Donegal Senior Football Championship—their first ever senior final—but lost, though McLaughlin scored during the game.

McLaughlin featured during the 2010 Ulster Under-21 Football Championship won by Donegal, starting against Armagh in the quarter-final, against Derry in the semi-final and against Cavan in the final (and scoring 0–2 in the semi-final).

Jim McGuinness first called him into the senior squad ahead of the 2011 Dr McKenna Cup.

McLaughlin's appearance as a substitute in the final was hailed as important to Donegal's historic second consecutive Ulster Senior Football Championship winning campaign of 2012. A squad member during Donegal's 2012 All-Ireland winning campaign, he did not play in the final but made a substitute appearances at Croke Park against Kerry in the quarter-final and Cork in the semi-final. He accompanied the team on their end-of-year holiday to Dubai.

He was still playing for Donegal as of 2015.

He managed his club in 2021.
