= 2016 Donegal Senior Football Championship =

Donegal S.F.C.
- Season: 2016
- Champions: Glenswilly (3rd title)
- Relegated: Glenfin
- Ulster SCFC: ???
- Winning captain: Gary McFadden (Glenswilly)
- Man of the Match: Michael Murphy (Glenswilly)
- Winning manager: Michael Canning
- Matches: ??

The 2016 Donegal Senior Football Championship was the 94th official edition of the Donegal GAA's premier club Gaelic football tournament for senior graded teams in County Donegal. The tournament consisted of 16 teams, with the winner going on to represent Donegal in the Ulster Senior Club Football Championship.

Naomh Conaill was defending champion after defeating St Eunan's by a scoreline of 0–11 to 0–10 in the 2015 final. However, the club relinquished its crown when losing to Cill Chartha at the semi-final stage.

This was Réalt na Mara's return to the senior grade after making the straight bounce back up from the I.F.C. since being relegated in 2014.

On 16 October 2016, Glenswilly claimed its third S.F.C. title when defeating Cill Chartha in the final in MacCumhaill Park 1-10 to 0-12.

Glenfin was relegated to the 2017 I.F.C. after losing a replay of the relegation final to Na Cealla Beaga, thus ending a 15-year stay in the top flight of Donegal football.

== Team changes ==
The following teams changed division since the 2015 championship season.

=== To S.F.C. ===
Promoted from 2015 Donegal I.F.C.

- Réalt na Mara – (I.F.C. Champions)

=== From S.F.C. ===
Relegated to 2016 Donegal I.F.C.

- Cloich Cheann Fhaola

== Format ==
The 2016 championship took the same format as the 2015 championship, in which there were four groups of four clubs, with the top two clubs qualifying for the quarter-finals. The club finishing bottom in each group contested relegation play-offs to determine which team would be relegated to the 2017 Donegal Intermediate Football Championship.

== Group stage ==
=== Group 1 ===
| Team | Pld | W | L | D | PF | PA | PD | Pts |
|---|---|---|---|---|---|---|---|---|
| Glenswilly | 3 | 2 | 1 | 0 | 40 | 25 | +15 | 4 |
| An Clochán Liath | 3 | 2 | 1 | 0 | 44 | 35 | +9 | 4 |
| Réalt na Mara | 3 | 1 | 2 | 0 | 32 | 51 | -19 | 2 |
| Ard an Rátha | 3 | 1 | 2 | 0 | 36 | 41 | -5 | 2 |

Round 1:

- An Clochán Liath 2-11, 0-7 Réalt na Mara, An Clochán Liath, 14/5/2016
- Ard an Rátha 0-8, 0-6 Glenswilly, Ard an Rátha, 15/5/2016

Round 2:

- Réalt na Mara 1-15, 0-13 Ard an Rátha, Bundoran, 27/8/2016
- Glenswilly 1-10, 0-10 An Clochán Liath, Glenswilly, 28/8/2016

Round 3:

- Réalt na Mara 0-7, 3-12 Glenswilly, Bundoran, 4/9/2016
- An Clochán Liath 0-17, 2-9 Ard an Rátha, An Clochán Liath, 4/9/2016

=== Group 2 ===
| Team | Pld | W | L | D | PF | PA | PD | Pts |
|---|---|---|---|---|---|---|---|---|
| Cill Chartha | 3 | 2 | 0 | 1 | 58 | 27 | +31 | 5 |
| St Eunan's | 3 | 2 | 0 | 1 | 56 | 44 | +12 | 5 |
| St Michael's | 3 | 2 | 1 | 0 | 46 | 52 | -6 | 2 |
| Na Cealla Beaga | 3 | 0 | 3 | 0 | 24 | 63 | -39 | 0 |

Round 1'

- St Eunan's 0-13, 1-10 Cill Chartha, O'Donnell Park, 15/5/2016
- St Michael's 2-13, 0-8 Na Cealla Beaga, Dunfanaghy, 15/5/2016

Round 2

- St Eunan's 2-14, 1-6 Na Cealla Beaga, Na Cealla Beaga, 27/8/2016
- Cill Chartha 2-15, 0-7 St Michael's, Cill Chartha, 28/8/2016

Round 3

- Na Cealla Beaga 0-7, 0-24 Cill Chartha, Na Cealla Beaga, 4/9/2016
- St Michael's 2-14, 3-14 St Eunan's, Dunfanaghy, 4/9/2016

=== Group 3 ===
| Team | Pld | W | L | D | PF | PA | PD | Pts |
|---|---|---|---|---|---|---|---|---|
| Malin | 3 | 2 | 0 | 1 | 52 | 39 | +13 | 5 |
| Seán Mac Cumhaills | 3 | 2 | 1 | 0 | 59 | 45 | +14 | 4 |
| Naomh Muire | 3 | 1 | 1 | 1 | 44 | 44 | +0 | 3 |
| Glenfin | 3 | 0 | 3 | 0 | 40 | 67 | -27 | 0 |

Round 1

- Malin 2-9, 1-9 Seán Mac Cumhaills, Connolly Park, 15/5/2016
- Naomh Muire 3-7, 0-11 Glenfin, Glenfin, 15/5/2016

Round 2

- Seán Mac Cumhaills 3-16, 1-10 Glenfin, MacCumhaill Park, 27/8/2016
- Naomh Muire 1-8, 1-8 Malin, The Banks, 28/8/2016

Round 3

- Seán Mac Cumhaills 4-10, 0-17 Naomh Muire, MacCumhaill Park, 4/9/2016
- Malin 2-20, 1-13 Glenfin, Malin, 4/9/2016

=== Group 4 ===
| Team | Pld | W | L | D | PF | PA | PD | Pts |
|---|---|---|---|---|---|---|---|---|
| Naomh Conaill | 3 | 3 | 0 | 0 | 65 | 30 | +35 | 6 |
| Termon | 3 | 2 | 1 | 0 | 38 | 40 | -2 | 4 |
| Gaoth Dobhair | 3 | 1 | 2 | 0 | 38 | 50 | -12 | 2 |
| Four Masters | 3 | 0 | 3 | 0 | 43 | 64 | -21 | 0 |

Round 1

- Naomh Conaill 1-11, 1-2 Termon, Glenties, 14/5/2016
- Gaoth Dobhair 2-12, 1-9 Four Masters, Gweedore, 15/5/2016

Round 2

- Termon 1-11, 0-9 Gaoth Dobhair, Termon, 27/8/16
- Four Masters 1-11, 5-12 Naomh Conaill, Pairc Tir Conaill, 28/8/16

Round 3

- Termon 2-13, 2-11 Four Masters, Termon, 4/9/2016
- Naomh Conaill 2-18, 0-11 Gaoth Dobhair, Glenties, 4/9/2016

== Knockout stage ==
=== Last Eight ===
| Quarter-finals | | Semi-finals | | Final |
| Naomh Conaill | 1-13 |
| St Eunan's | 1-8 | Naomh Conaill | 1-11 |
| Cill Chartha | 0-19 | Cill Chartha | 5-10 |
| Termon | 0-4 | | | Cill Chartha | 0-12 |
| Glenswilly | 2-20 | | | Glenswilly | 1-10 |
| Seán Mac Cumhaills | 1-14 | Glenswilly | 0-9 |
| Malin | 0-13 | Malin | 0-7 |
| An Clochán Liath | 1-8 |

Quarter-finals

- Cill Chartha 0-19, 0-4 Termon, MacCumhaill Park, 24/9/2016,
- Glenswilly 2-20, 1-14 Seán Mac Cumhaills, O'Donnell Park, 24/9/2016,
- Naomh Conaill 1-13, 1-8 St Eunan's, MacCumhaill Park, 25/9/2016,
- Malin 0-13, 1-8 An Clochán Liath, O'Donnell Park, 25/9/2016,

Semi-finals

- Cill Chartha 5-10, 1-11 Naomh Conaill, MacCumhaill Park, 2/10/2016,
- Glenswilly 0-9, 0-7 Malin, O'Donnell Park, 2/10/2016,

=== Final ===
16 October 2016
15:30
Final

| Glenswilly | 1-10 – 0-12 | Cill Chartha |
|---|---|---|
| Michael Murphy 1-5 (0-3f, 0-1 '45), Ciaran Gibbons 0-2, Brian Farrelly, Gary McFadden (0-1f), Darren McGinley 0-1 each | Report | Patrick McBrearty 0-5 (0-4f), Ryan McHugh 0-3 (0-2f), Michael Hegarty, Stephen McBrearty (0-1 f), Conor Doherty, Ciaran Bonner 0-1 each |

MacCumhaill Park
Referee: Shaun McLaughlin (Malin)

== Relegation playoffs ==
=== Relegation Semi-finals ===
- Four Masters 1-13, 0-7 Glenfin, Killygordon, 24/9/2016
- Ard an Rátha 1-9, 1-5 Na Cealla Beaga, Dunkineely, 25/9/2016

=== Relegation final ===
- Na Cealla Beaga 1-11, 2-8 Glenfin, O'Donnell Park, 15/10/2016,
- Na Cealla Beaga 2-13, 1-6 Glenfin, O'Donnell Park, 22/10/2016, (Replay)

== Gradam Shéamuis Mhic Géidigh ==
Michael Murphy was named as the recipient of the inaugural Gradam Shéamuis Mhic Géidigh.
