= Eamon McGee =

Irish Gaelic footballer (born 1984)

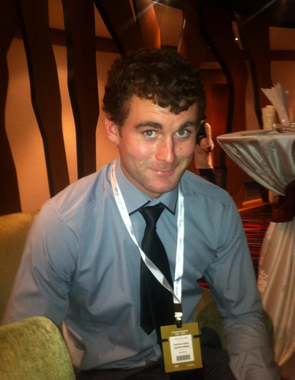

Personal information
- Native name: Éamonn Mac Aoidh (Irish)
- Born: 26 April 1984 (age 42) Letterkenny, Ireland
- Occupation: Physical therapist
- Height: 1.87 m (6 ft 2 in)

Sport
- Sport: Gaelic football
- Position: Right Corner Back
Club
- Years: Club
- 2001–: Gaoth Dobhair
Club titles
- Donegal titles: 3
- Ulster titles: 1
Inter-county
Years	County	Apps (scores)
2004–2016	Donegal	154 (GLS?-PTS?)
Inter-county titles
- Ulster titles: 3
- All-Irelands: 1
- NFL: 1
- All Stars: 0

Eamon McGee (born 26 April 1984) is an Irish Gaelic footballer who plays for Gaoth Dobhair and also, formerly, for the Donegal county team (between 2004 and 2016). He is the older brother of Neil McGee.

From Gweedore in County Donegal, he won one All-Ireland Senior Football Championship title, three Ulster Senior Football Championship titles and one National Football League title with his county and an Ulster title with his club. For a small time until Patrick McBrearty, Neil McGee, Paddy McGrath, Leo McLoone, Frank McGlynn, Michael Murphy and Anthony Thompson surpassed it in 2018, McGee's haul of Ulster SFC titles was a joint county team record (alongside such past players as Anthony Molloy, Martin McHugh, Joyce McMullan and Donal Reid).

== Playing career ==
=== Club ===
McGee made his championship debut for his club against Seán Mac Cumhaills on 8 July 2001. By 2023 he had won three Donegal Senior Football Championship (SFC) titles with his club: in 2002, 2006 and 2018; and he had played for his club in 23 consecutive championship campaigns, including in 35 consecutive championship games between 2001 and 2009. Ahead of the 2023 Donegal Senior Football Championship final, he had made 97 appearances in the club championship (92 in the Donegal SFC and 5 in the Ulster and All-Ireland Club SFC).

The final of the 2002 Donegal SFC, featuring McGee and his club, was not played until 2003 due to a disagreement between two other clubs over Eddie Brennan. McGee has described the medal he received as "tainted".

In 2006, his club returned to the Donegal SFC final. McGee played as his team won a 14th title, in one of the worst Donegal county finals ever.

McGee was sent off in the final of the 2018 Ulster Senior Club Football Championship.

=== Inter-county ===
McGee was first called up to the senior team by Brian McEniff for winter training in 2003. His early years in a Donegal shirt were marked by lapses of discipline—at one point Shane Carr left the panel when McGee moved ahead of him on the substitutes bench despite his lack of dedication.

During the 2004 All-Ireland Senior Football Championship, he and Brian McLaughlin were suspended from the Donegal panel for a breach of discipline. The BBC reported that the pair had arrived for a "training session in an unfit condition" on two consecutive nights, one month after failing to turn up for one session at all.

In 2006, he and Kevin Cassidy were suspended from the Donegal football panel over a breach of discipline. McGee later returned and played in the 2006 Ulster Senior Football Championship Final at Croke Park, scoring one point.

McGee was a member of the Donegal team that won the National Football League in 2007, playing from the start to the end in the final against Mayo.

He spent some time in London and trained with their county team before returning to Donegal in 2010.

He and his brother played in the 2012 All-Ireland Senior Football Championship Final against Mayo. He had missed the start of the 2012 Ulster Senior Football Championship with a hamstring injury.

He departed the inter-county scene in 2016.

He thinks that the All Stars "mean very little" but admits his own total affects this thinking. Himself and Paddy Andrews agree on this.

=== Inter-provincial ===
McGee represented Ulster in the Inter-Provincial Series.

== Post-playing career ==
In November 2017, he became part of Gary McDaid's backroom team when McDaid became the first manager of the new Donegal under-20 football team.

In March 2021, Donegal announced him as part of Gary Duffy's under-20 management team. In November 2022, he was part of the management team announced for Duffy's successor, Leo McLoone.

On the night of 25 November 2023, McGee was announced as a coach under the senior football management team of Gary Duffy at the Buncrana club.

== Personal life ==
McGee has a profound fear of flying, a condition which has affected his ability to cope with flights to games.

McGee supports marriage equality and has campaigned to Repeal the 8th Amendment of the Irish Constitution.

== Honours ==
Donegal

- All-Ireland Senior Football Championship: 2012
- Ulster Senior Football Championship: 2011, 2012, 2014
- National Football League Division 1: 2007
- National Football League Division 2: 2011
- Dr McKenna Cup: 2009, 2010

Gaoth Dobhair

- Donegal Senior Football Championship: 2002, 2006, 2018

Colleges

- Sigerson Cup: 2004, 2005

Individual

- All Star: 0
  - Nominated in 2012, 2014
- Player of the Week: February 2013
