= Michael Murphy (Gaelic footballer) =

Donegal Gaelic footballer (born 1989)

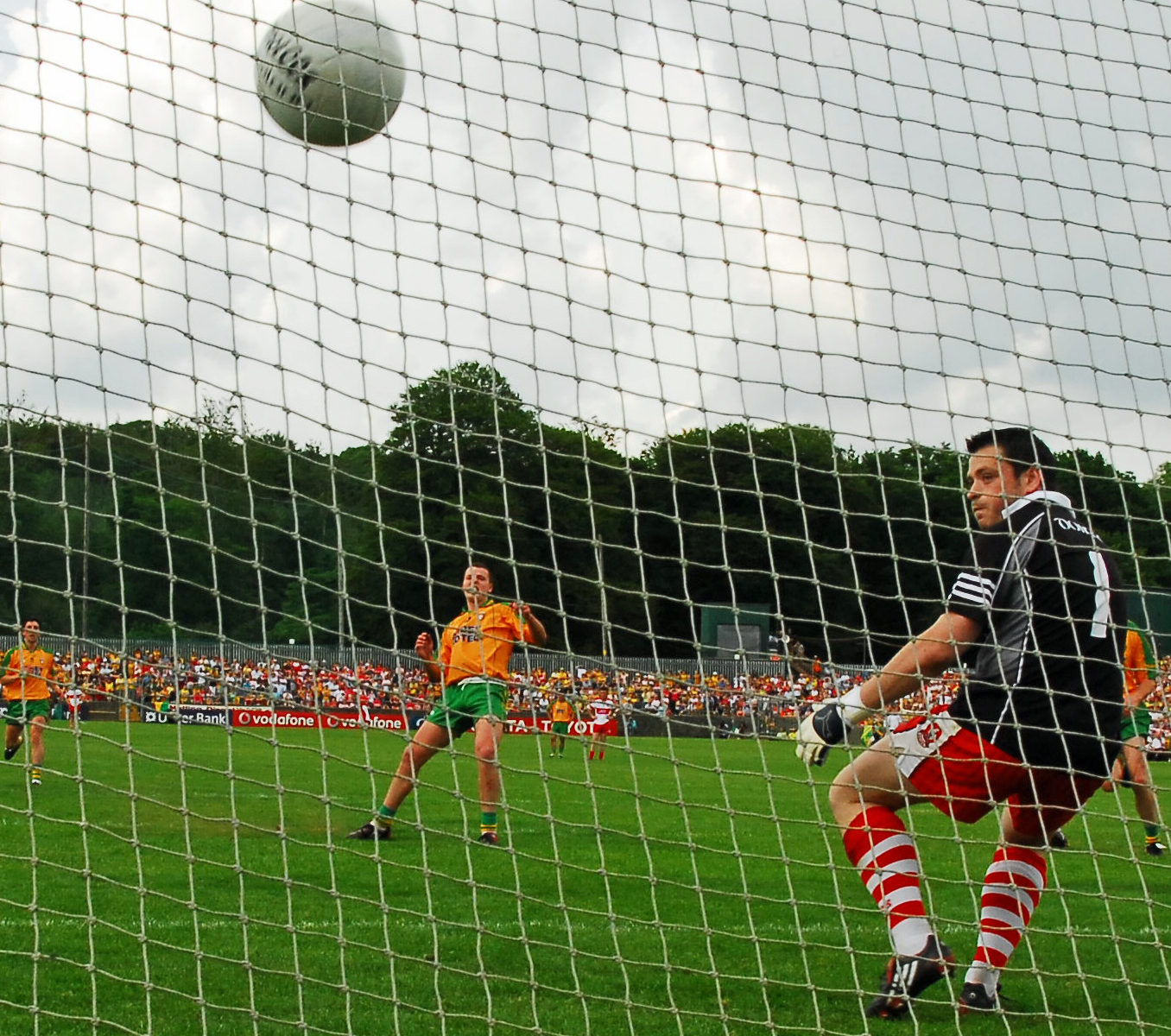
- Michael Murphy scores a penalty against Derry in the 2008 Ulster Senior Football Championship

Personal information
- Native name: Mícheál Ó Murchú (Irish)
- Born: 4 August 1989 (age 37) Letterkenny, County Donegal
- Height: 6 ft 2 in (188 cm)

Sport
- Sport: Gaelic football
- Position: Full forward
Club
- Years: Club
- 2006–: Glenswilly
Club titles
- Donegal titles: 3
College
- Years: College
- 200?–201?: DCU
College titles
- Sigerson titles: 1 (2012)
Inter-county*
Years	County	Apps (scores)
2007–2022 2025-2026	Donegal; Donegal	64 (9-223); 11 (0-50)
Inter-county titles
- Ulster titles: 6
- All-Irelands: 1
- NFL: 1
- All Stars: 4
- *Inter County team apps and scores correct as of 20:11, 30 March 2026.

Michael Murphy (born 4 August 1989) is an Irish Gaelic footballer who plays as a full forward for Glenswilly and for the Donegal county team, which he captained from December 2010 until his initial retirement from inter-county football in November 2022. His predecessors as Donegal players, such as Manus Boyle, Brendan Devenney and Anthony Molloy, regard Murphy as the county's greatest ever footballer. Outside his county he is often regarded as one of the sport's all-time best players. With more than 500 points, Murphy is Donegal's all-time record scorer and he is also the county's top goalscorer, with a points-per-game average that is higher even than Martin McHugh.

Born and raised in north-west Ireland, Murphy's hip was out of place from birth and required surgery at the Mater Misericordiae University Hospital. After a fast progression through Glenswilly's youth academy, Murphy made his full competitive debut in 2005, having just turned 16, and helped his club reach the Ulster Intermediate Club Football Championship final that year. He was a member of the team that won his club's first Donegal Senior Football Championship title in 2011, and followed this up with two others in 2013 and 2016. Glenswilly also reached the final of the Ulster Senior Club Football Championship in 2013.

A Donegal man, Murphy is his county's all-time leading scorer. At youth level he won an Ulster Minor Football Championship title, an Ulster Under-21 Football Championship title and contested an All-Ireland Under-21 Football Championship final. Murphy made his competitive debut for his county aged 17 in July 2007 and won the All Stars Young Footballer of the Year in 2009. At 21 years old, Murphy received the Donegal captaincy from newly appointed manager Jim McGuinness, who had worked with Murphy the previous season at under-21 level. In doing so he became one of the youngest captains in the team's history. Four successful seasons followed, with Murphy winning two All Stars, three Ulster Senior Football Championship titles (including two consecutively) and the All-Ireland Senior Football Championship title, only the second player in the county's history to raise the Sam Maguire Cup as team captain. He received the 2012 All-Ireland Senior Football Championship final man of the match award and his catch from a Karl Lacey pass, turn leaving his marker Kevin Keane clutching at air and rocket strike past David Clarke into the roof of the Mayo net in the opening minutes of that game to set the score at 1–0 to 0–0 earned him the Championship Matters Goal of the Championship. A team decline under the management of McGuinness's deputy and successor Rory Gallagher was followed by two further Ulster SFC titles under Declan Bonner, all of which Murphy had achieved by the age of 30. This brought Donegal's total provincial championships to ten, with the 6th, 7th, 8th, 9th and 10th of these all coming under Murphy's captaincy.

Though targeted by Australian rules football clubs since 2007, Murphy declined all offers to move abroad, preferring instead to pursue further honours in Gaelic football. He has, however, played for the Ireland international rules football team and captained the 2013 and 2014 teams.

== Early life ==
Michael Murphy was born on 4 August 1989 in Letterkenny, the only child of Mick Murphy, a member of the Garda Síochána, and his wife Mary, who worked for the local health service. On his father's side, he has primarily County Mayo ancestry.

Born with his hip out of place Murphy underwent surgery at the Mater Misericordiae University Hospital in Dublin after Donegal's defeat to Meath in the 1990 All-Ireland Senior Football Championship semi-final. Brought back to the capital city for regular check-ups, one day Murphy asked his father if he could go into Croke Park. A security guard permitted them to enter and the legendary Mícheál Ó Muircheartaigh approached them. Ó Muircheartaigh shook the hand of the young Murphy and asked him did he "know the big man — Anthony Molloy?" Murphy said, "I do. He's the captain of Donegal." Murphy, the future captain of Donegal, then walked onto the pitch at Croke Park for the first time, with Ó Muircheartaigh alongside him.

Murphy, Molloy and Maguire later appeared in a photograph together when Murphy was a boy. It was not the only photo of the boy Murphy with Molloy.

Murphy travelled throughout the country with his parents to attend Donegal games when he was a child. Murphy attended the 1998 Ulster SFC Final, later recalling: "I remember exactly where I was sitting in the Gerry Arthurs Stand, watching out and seeing Geoffrey McGonagle's infamous dunt on Noel McGinley and all the dreams went".

Murphy's childhood hero was Brendan Devenney, whom he later had the opportunity to play alongside during Murphy's early, and Devenney's later, days in a Donegal jersey.

== Education ==
Murphy played for his secondary school St Eunan's College. In 2007, Murphy was a member of the College team that won its fourth McLarnon Cup, and went on to the All-Ireland Colleges Senior Football Championship "B" Final, where they were beaten by a score of 2–12 to 0–14 after extra time by perennial football power St Mary's of Edenderry, County Offaly. In 2008, Murphy was involved as his team opted to participate at "A" level, a successful promotion as they advanced as far as the semi-final of the MacRory Cup.

Murphy graduated from Dublin City University (DCU) in 2013 with a degree in physical education with biology, While studying there, he shared living space with Paul Flynn and Aidan Walsh, fellow All-Ireland winners with Dublin and Cork, respectively. With the DCU football team Murphy won the 2012 Sigerson Cup, defeating NUI Maynooth in the final. He was hailed after his performance in the 2013 quarter-final knocked UCD out of the competition.

Murphy is also a graduate of the Phoenix Elite Academy.

== Club ==
Murphy was called up to the Glenswilly senior football team in 2005 when he was just turned 16, and helped them reach the Ulster Intermediate Club Football Championship Final. In 2007, aged just 18, he was a key member of the Glenswilly side that had success in the 2007 Donegal Senior Football Championship, beaten only by St Eunan's in the final 0–12 to 1–3. Also, winning the All County Division Two League that same season.

In 2011, Murphy was part of the Glenswilly team that won its first ever Donegal Senior Football Championship title, defeating St Michael's by 1–8 to 0–9 in the final. Murphy scored 1–7 of his team's 1–8 total in a Man of the Match performance. With Glenswilly thus progressing to the Ulster Club Championship first round, Murphy scored a crucial goal from the penalty spot as Glenswilly defeated Cavan Gaels by 1–8 to 0–10.

In October 2013, Murphy won his second Donegal Senior Football Championship title, as Glenswilly defeated Na Cealla Beaga by a scoreline of 3–19 to 2–6. Murphy scored 1–5 and set up Ciaran Bonner's goal with a deft flick of the heel. Murphy played less than 24 hours after captaining Ireland in the first 2013 International Rules Test win against Australia. Glenswilly progressed to the final of that year's Ulster Senior Club Football Championship, which they lost to Ballinderry, despite Murphy opening the scoring with a goal after 25 seconds and later assisting Caolan Kelly for a second.

Murphy won a third Donegal SFC in 2016.

== Inter-county ==
=== Minor and under-21: 2006–2010 ===
Murphy experienced under-age success with Donegal as a member of Donegal's 2006 Ulster Minor Football Championship-winning side.

He captained the 2010 Ulster Under-21 Football Championship-winning side, contributing 0–1 in the three-point quarter-final victory over Armagh, 1–2 (including two frees) in the four-point semi-final victory over Derry and 1–5 (including two frees) in the comprehensive final victory over Cavan, with all three games played at neutral Brewster Park. He then played in the final of the 2010 All-Ireland Under-21 Football Championship, which Donegal (managed by Jim McGuinness) narrowly lost to Dublin (managed by Jim Gavin). Murphy scored two frees and battled against future Dublin star Rory O'Carroll.

=== Early years at senior level: 2007–2010 ===
"He came in when he was a minor, and it was obvious how good he was. He was fit to hold his own. He was fit to compete even then at 17 or 18-years-old, and was further on in his development".

— Colm McFadden on Murphy

Murphy made his senior debut for Donegal in January 2007 against UUJ in the Dr McKenna Cup. He made his All-Ireland Senior Football Championship debut later that year in a qualifier.

Though he played in the Ulster Senior Football Championship, he did not win a game until 2011 due to his team's lack of success at the time.

At the end of the 2009 season, he received the All Stars Young Footballer of the Year, having scored 36 points in six All-Ireland Senior Football Championship appearances, sixteen of them from play.

=== Jim McGuinness and Donegal captaincy: 2010–2014 ===
In December 2010, the newly appointed Donegal manager Jim McGuinness named Murphy captain ahead of the 2011 season. Succeeding Kevin Cassidy in the role, Murphy became one of the youngest skippers in the county's history. The decision to select such a young man as team captain was unexpected. He would go on to become the most successful captain in team history, retaining the role throughout the McGuinness era and under McGuinness's successors.

In 2011, with Donegal breaching four years without any silverware whatsoever, Murphy captained the senior team to the National Football League Division 2 title. He scored 1–3 in his team's 2–11 to 0–16 victory over Laois in the final. Murphy continued his success as captain by leading Donegal to their first Ulster Senior Football Championship title in 19 years, with a win over Derry in Clones, scoring a penalty just after half-time in a 1–11 to 0–08 win. Donegal went on to reach the All-Ireland SFC semi-final, where they suffered a narrow defeat to eventual champions Dublin in an extremely close match.

In 2012, Murphy became the first player to captain Donegal to back-to-back Ulster titles, and later added the All-Ireland title—only the second Donegal captain to lift the Sam Maguire Cup, after Anthony Molloy in 1992. Although Murphy's scoring totals decreased after 2011, McGuinness praised him for his work rate and unselfish play.

Murphy smashed the ball into the Mayo net after three minutes of the 2012 All-Ireland Senior Football Championship Final, having collecting a high ball delivered by Karl Lacey. That catch and strike was widely hailed as 2012's iconic score and Goal of the Season. Upon climbing the Hogan Stand after the game, lifting the Sam Maguire Cup and catching his breath, Murphy was handed a microphone to make his speech. He began by bellowing "We have him"—in reference to the Sam Maguire Cup. He ended with a chorus of "Jimmy's winning matches. Jimmy's winning games. Jimmy's bringing Sammy back to Donegal again". GAA President Liam O'Neill later related that Murphy, as they exchanged the Sam Maguire Cup, had offered his condolences on the sudden death of O'Neill's sister the previous day. President O'Neill went on to express his admiration for Murphy and called him an "exceptional young captain".

Murphy won his first All Star and attended the Football Tour of New York.

Murphy opened the 2013 season on 2 February with nine points against Kildare in the opening league game at Croke Park. Analysts praised the skills he displayed throughout that game; at one point in the second half he stretched high into the air to meet a miscalculated free from Paddy McBrearty and gave it an almighty thump with his fist over the bar, while on another occasion he left the Kildare defender stumbling along the ground as he sidestepped him and casually at an angle from distance, with the appearance of little effort whatsoever, kicked the ball over the bar. Against Tyrone on 3 March, he scored three from four of Donegal's points and then, shortly before half-time, having had a penalty saved by TG4 Man of the Match Niall Morgan, Murphy struck out and was issued with a second yellow card by Joe McQuillan. Against Kerry on 10 March, man of the match Murphy dispatched a penalty and five points in Donegal's comfortable victory over the league's whipping boys.

=== Bonner–McGuinness interim and retention of captaincy: 2014–2017 ===
One of the more memorable moments of 2015 from Murphy was his touch to Ryan McHugh for Donegal's second goal in their Championship victory over Galway at Croke Park. It was considered one of the goals of the season. He also scored 0–8 (five of which were frees) in the next game against Mayo, at the same venue. Murphy had earlier (in the 2015 National Football League) scored 1–3 (consisting of one penalty, two frees and one 45) against Kerry at Austin Stack Park before scoring six points against Tyrone in the next game (five in the first half, four of these frees, three of which RTÉ described as "monster efforts" from a distance of sixty metres). Though he did not score from play, he gave a noteworthy performance against Armagh in the 2015 Ulster Senior Football Championship quarter-final and converted five frees.

In the opening fixture of the 2016 National Football League away to Down, Murphy scored 0–8 (seven of which were frees). He scored 1–4 (0–2 of which were frees, 0–1 of which was from a '45) in the fourth fixture, away to Kerry at Austin Stack Park. He scored another 0–7 (four of which were frees) against Roscommon in the next game.

In 2017, Murphy was bothered by injuries to the groin and knee. He nevertheless scored 1–4 (including a penalty and three frees) in the 2017 National Football League opener against Kerry. He also scored an injury-time point from a free to secure a draw against Dublin in the same competition. Murphy later scored 0–7 (including four frees) against Monaghan, again in the league. He scored 0–6 (including five frees) in the 2017 Ulster Senior Football Championship quarter-final against Antrim. It was in this game that Murphy became Donegal's all-time record scorer, surpassing Colm McFadden's record.

=== Declan Bonner, retention of captaincy and initial retirement: 2017–2022 ===
He returned in early 2018 to play Dublin in the 2018 National Football League at Croke Park. Described by one commentator as "out-of-form and sluggish", he was commended for staying behind to do extra runs in an empty stadium. He went on to captain Donegal to a win over Fermanagh in the final of the 2018 Ulster Senior Football Championship. His form in 2018 was considered to be a return to his best. He scored 0–9 (including three frees and a '45) against Roscommon in the 2018 All-Ireland Senior Football Championship.

In January 2019, it was announced that Murphy had undergone knee surgery and would miss the opening fixtures of the 2019 National Football League. He returned against Armagh nearly two months later, scoring a decisive one goal and two points in a substitute appearance that helped his county to a narrow one-point win. Against Kildare in the final round of the league, his presence was critical to the outcome of the match, which ended in Donegal's favour. Donegal qualified for the National Football League Division 2 final and Murphy started the game in an advanced role, scoring 0–7 (including five frees and two marks) in a man-of-the-match performance as Donegal defeated Meath to win the title.

Murphy scored 1–7 (including 0–4 in frees) against Kerry in their 2019 All-Ireland Senior Football Championship quarter-final meeting at Croke Park. The goal was a penalty. As he set himself to take that penalty, a line of stewards in neon-coloured coats walked behind the goal. Murphy had the ball past the Kerry goalkeeper before he had a chance to move. This was Murphy's 150th match for Donegal, and his 53rd as captain.

In the 2020 National Football League, Murphy endured two Dublin players "hanging out of him" in their one-point loss to the five-times reigning All-Ireland champions at Croke Park. Analysts on League Sunday condemned the "cynicism" from Dublin, "the way they closed out the game", and called for it "to be stamped out". RTÉ.ie stated: "On Saturday evening at Croke Park we were served up another undedifying [sic] denouement".

He scored six points from play against Armagh in the 2022 Ulster Senior Football Championship quarter-final and The Irish News described him as "finish[ing] the game looking flying-fit".

Ahead of the 2023 season, Murphy announced his retirement from inter-county football on 16 November 2022, ending his 15-year senior career. He released a statement via the county board. Murphy's retirement, at the age of 33, was unexpected.

=== Return under Jim McGuinness: 2024– ===
"I said 'Holy Jesus, there's only half of you there'. I've never seen him as lean. He's nearly 36."

— Niall Moyna—Murphy's old DCU coach on meeting him in 2025 after his return from inter-county retirement.

In November 2024, it was announced that Michael Murphy would come out of retirement and again represent the county, under the manager that he captained them to the All Ireland

This meant Murphy departed a role he had on the Football Review Committee.

Live on television, in the 2025 National League meeting of Armagh and Donegal at MacCumhaill Park, Armagh's 2024 All-Ireland SFC-winning captain Aidan Forker headbutted Michael Murphy in the 44th minute. This was within moments of Murphy's reintroduction (as a substitute) to inter-county football, and referee Sean Hurson sent Forker off. Forker's headbutt of Michael Murphy was widely compared to Zinedine Zidane's headbutt during the 2006 FIFA World Cup final, though — unlike Zidane's opponent — Murphy stood firm and did not even move.

Murphy's extraordinary form in the 2025 All-Ireland SFC led Donegal to the final against Kerry.

In November 2026, Murphy announced his retirement from inter-county football for the second time.

== Inter-provincial ==
Murphy has played for Ulster in the Inter-Provincial Series.

== International rules ==
Murphy travelled to Australia for an under-17 international rules series in 2006, despite being a year underage. He has been the target of Australian rules football clubs since 2007, but had refused all offers until 2009, when he was reported to be considering a move. However, in 2010 he said that he had turned down a move and was not considering it in the future.

Murphy made his first appearance for Ireland against Australia in the 2010 International Rules Series. In 2011, he travelled to Australia for his second series where he played an integral part of Ireland's record aggregate 130–65 win. Murphy was considered to be one of Ireland's best performers, finishing as joint-second top scorer with 19 points overall, including the opening goal in the first test. He was named as captain of the Irish team for the 2013 Series. He led Ireland to a record-breaking victory.

Murphy was again named as captain of the Irish team for 2014.

He was involved again in the 2017 International Rules Series.

== Player profile ==
=== Style of play ===
"He is quiet by nature and shuns the limelight but always leads by example. And apart from these obvious qualities, he can catch, kick frees, tackle and plays from square to square and is definitely the complete package".

— Anthony Molloy on Murphy

A prodigious talent as a teenager, Murphy established himself among the sport's best players before the age of 20. While attending St Eunan's College and playing for the school team, opponents were already hailing him as the best young footballer in the country and likening him to Roald Dahl's Big Friendly Giant for the manner in which he could bundle county minor players aside and leave them poleaxed on the ground. Future Tyrone star Mattie Donnelly described Murphy as "the strongest person I have ever come up against on a football pitch" and remarked, years after encountering a 17-year-old Murphy at schoolboy level: "He just grabbed me and you couldn't move, like… I have to admit I think he was on one leg that night. They were peppering every ball in on top of him. I think he got five frees that night, I might have fouled him for all five of them."

While attending Dublin City University and playing for its football team in the Sigerson Cup, Murphy's style of play, his skill, intensity and dominance over other players earned him comparisons with Cristiano Ronaldo and Lionel Messi.

Though naturally right-footed/handed, Murphy continued to work on improving his left foot/hand after being appointed to the county captaincy.

During 2017, Murphy maintained his scoring capacity even after taking up a role as libero at the base of Donegal's midfield in the wake of the retirements and departures of Neil Gallagher, Rory Kavanagh, Christy Toye and Odhrán Mac Niallais.

=== Reception ===
Murphy is reserved and unassuming, an unremarkable man outside of football. His modesty has been remarked upon.

When Murphy mentioned on The Sunday Game that his childhood hero had been Brendan Devenney, he informed Devenney in advance of his wish for him to watch the programme. Devenney was thrilled, later recalling: "And that was back when Michael was already the fuckin' man! The fact that he has called me his hero is, probably, the most humbling thing that anyone has ever said to me". Devenney later said: "Has anyone's hero turned around and then been their hero? Because Michael would be mine. So it's come full circle".

=== Comparisons to Mark English ===
Murphy is widely regarded as County Donegal's greatest ever athlete in any sport. RTÉ athletics analyst Jerry Kiernan disputed this and stated in 2014 that Mark English was better than Murphy, saying: "[Murphy] is playing against lads from Monaghan. Mark English is running against Kenyans". Following English's bronze medal in the 800 metres at the 2019 European Athletics Indoor Championships on 3 March 2019, Kiernan went even further by saying English was Ireland's "greatest talent" ever in middle-distance running.

== Coaching and management ==
Murphy first coached when he was in his teens. He was overage to be considered as a MacRory Cup player during his time repeating the Leaving Certificate, but he assisted Gary McDaid with the school team anyway.

Murphy was appointed manager of his local college team in 2017. He said in 2019: "The coaching without a doubt… The coaching side of things is definitely the point of it. I suppose management encapsulates a lot of things in so far as you're organising and ensuring everything is right behind the scenes as well as out on the coaching pitch and playing pitch. I just love getting out onto the pitch and working on things, trying new things and things that have worked before, taking learnings from coaches that I've had before. I've been very lucky to have played under a hell of a lot and still play under a lot. You take a lot and copy a lot of what they do… I see it all now. You see it from the coach's side. You used to just think about being out on the pitch but in terms of the whole background of it, there's a hell of a lot more to management than just being out coaching". He stayed in the role until 2021.

== Outside football ==
In a 2011 interview with the GAA website, Murphy listed as — among his other interests — reading, watching television, playing Xbox and listening to the music of Mumford & Sons and Snow Patrol.

In October 2018, Murphy joined Donegal Junior League soccer side Lagan Harps during his winter break from club and county duties.

Murphy's 30th birthday was marked by Ireland's national media.

In 2020, he was reported to be doing a course in sports and exercise psychology at Jordanstown.

=== Marriage ===
Murphy married Annie Keeney, from Glenties, abroad in Florence, Italy, at the end of 2023. They had been engaged since 25 December 2021. The couple had been dating for five years until that, having met in 2016.

=== Business ===
In conjunction with teammate Neil Gallagher, Murphy opened his own sports store, "Michael Murphy Sports and Leisure", in Letterkenny in August 2014.

=== Advocacy and ambassadorial roles ===
Murphy has participated in a marketing campaign for Ireland West Airport. Less than a week after the 2014 All-Ireland Senior Football Championship final, Murphy attended the 2014 Ryder Cup in Perthshire, Scotland. He has been active in encouraging people to read more books. He met Prince Harry and wife at Croke Park in 2018.

In 2019, Murphy was elected to the national executive of the Gaelic Players Association (GPA).

He has spoken in public about men's mental health.

=== Television work ===
"Michael is god up here. They call Peter Canavan god, but Murphy is our god."

— Brian McEniff—The Irish Times in 2025.

Murphy appeared in the documentary The Toughest Trade in 2017. He exchanged places with rugby star Shane Williams and spent a week at French rugby team Clermont, while Williams joined up with Murphy's club Glenswilly.

In 2017, Murphy appeared in a street Gaelic football film created by Peil Star with Charlie Vernon from Armagh. The film was shot in Omagh for the BBC.

Murphy worked as an analyst for eirSport during their coverage of the 2017 Donegal Senior Football Championship semi-final between Gaoth Dobhair and Naomh Conaill. He made his debut as an analyst on The Sunday Game for the night-time broadcast of highlights of the 2018 All-Ireland SFC semi-final meeting of Monaghan and Tyrone on 12 August 2018. His debut was received positively by viewers and reviewers alike, with one noting: "It shouldn't come as much of a surprise to learn that Murphy is competent in front of the camera. The man can do just about anything. Clearly prepared, the Letterkenny native spoke honestly, eloquently and fastidiously". Murphy returned to The Sunday Game on the night of the 2018 All-Ireland Senior Football Championship final. He also appeared on the night of the 2019 All-Ireland Senior Football Championship final drawn game between Dublin and Kerry.

Murphy appeared as a guest on 2020's second episode of The Sunday Game when play was suspended due to the COVID-19 pandemic.

He appeared on The Sunday Game for the 2022 All-Ireland Senior Football Championship semi-finals.

== Honours and achievements ==
=== Inter-county ===
==== Donegal ====
- All-Ireland Senior Football Championship: 2012 (c)
- Ulster Senior Football Championship: 2011 (c), 2012 (c), 2014 (c), 2018 (c), 2019 (c), 2025
- National Football League Division 1: 2026
- National Football League Division 2: 2011 (c), 2019 (c)
- Dr McKenna Cup: 2009, 2010, 2018

==== Youth ====
- All-Ireland Under-21 Football Championship runner-up: 2010
- Ulster Under-21 Football Championship: 2010
- Ulster Minor Football Championship: 2006
- Ulster Minor Football League: 2006

=== Inter-provincial ===
==== Ulster ====
- Railway Cup: 2009

=== International ===
==== Ireland ====
- International Rules Series: 2011, 2013 (c)

=== Club ===
==== Glenswilly ====
- Donegal Senior Football Championship: 2011, 2013, 2016
- Donegal Division Three League: 2007

=== College ===
==== Dublin City University ====
- Sigerson Cup: 2012

=== Individual ===
==== All Stars ====
- All Star: 2012, 2014, 2019, 2025
  - Nominated in the Full Forward category in 2009
  - Nominated in the Full Forward category in 2011
  - Nominated in the Forward category in 2015
  - Nominated in the Midfield category in 2018
- All Stars Young Footballer of the Year: 2009
- GAA/GPA All-Stars Player of the Month: September 2012, July 2019
- Footballer of the Year nomination: 2025
- Irish News Ulster All Star: 2009, 2011, 2012, 2014, 2015, 2018, 2019
- Irish News Ulster Player of the Year: 2019

==== Other ====
- Gradam Shéamuis Mhic Géidigh: 2016
- The Sunday Game Team of the Year: 2009, 2012, 2014, 2019 2025
- Championship Matters Goal of the Championship: 2012
- Ulster Footballer of the Year: 2019
- Ulster GAA Writers Personality of the Year: 2012
- Donegal News Sports Personality Winner: September 2012
- Silver Jubilee Football Team of the Ulster GAA Writers Association (UGAAWA) nomination: 2012
- Ulster GAA Writers Association (UGAAWA) Personality of the Year: 2012
- Donegal Footballer of the Year: 2009, 2013, 2019

==== Era-spanning ====
- In May 2012, the Irish Independent named him in its selection of Donegal's "greatest team" spanning the previous 50 years, one of only two players representing the county at that time to be included.
- In October 2019, Colm Keys named him as part of his "Football Team of the Decade" in the Irish Independent; Donegal's sole other inclusion was Karl Lacey.
- In May 2020, a public poll conducted by RTÉ.ie named Murphy at full forward alongside Kerry's Colm Cooper and Maurice Fitzgerald in a team of footballers who had won All Stars during the era of The Sunday Game. He was one of only three players who did not play for either Dublin or Kerry to be included on the team.
- Also in May 2020, the Irish Independent named Murphy in its "Top 20 footballers in Ireland over the past 50 years", ranking in second place among Ulster footballers (with only Peter Canavan ahead of him), and regarded as superior to the Meath trio of Colm O'Rourke, Trevor Giles and Graham Geraghty, the Galway duo of Pádraic Joyce and Michael Donnellan, Dermot Earley Snr, Derry's Anthony Tohill, Tyrone's Seán Cavanagh and Kerry's Maurice Fitzgerald (Donnellan, Earley, Geraghty and Tohill did not even make the top 20 list but were named as having narrowly missed out on inclusion).

==== From a single game ====
- All-Ireland Senior Football Championship final man of the match: 2012
- Ulster Senior Football Championship final man of the match: 2011
- Donegal Senior Football Championship final man of the match: 2011, 2013, 2016

=== Records ===
==== Donegal ====
- Donegal all-time top scorer: ??-?

== See also ==
- List of All-Ireland Senior Football Championship winning captains
- List of Ireland international rules football team captains

Awards and achievements
Preceded by Bryan Cullen (Dublin)	All-Ireland SFC winning captain 2012	Succeeded by Stephen Cluxton (Dublin)
Preceded by Kevin Nolan (Dublin)	All-Ireland Senior Football Final; Man of the Match; 2012	Succeeded by Bernard Brogan (Dublin)

Sporting positions
Preceded by Kevin Cassidy	Donegal Senior Football Captain; 2011–2022	Succeeded by Patrick McBrearty
