= Brian McLaughlin (Gaelic footballer) =

Irish Gaelic footballer

Personal information
- Native name: Brian Mac Lochlainn (Irish)

Sport
- Sport: Gaelic football
Club
- Years: Club
- ?–: St Michael's
Inter-county
- Years: County
- ?–200?: Donegal

Brian McLaughlin is an Irish former Gaelic footballer who played for St Michael's and the Donegal county team.

He won the 1995 All-Ireland Vocational Schools Championship.

During the 2004 All-Ireland Senior Football Championship, he and Eamon McGee were suspended from the Donegal panel for a breach of discipline. The BBC reported that the pair had arrived for a "training session in an unfit condition" on two consecutive nights, one month after failing to turn up for one session at all.

McLaughlin's club have not had much success at senior level. They reached the final of the 2011 Donegal Senior Football Championship—their first ever senior final—but lost.

Previously, in 2004, they reached the final of All-Ireland Intermediate Club Football Championship, in which McLaughlin scored two points (including one free).
