= 2007 Dr McKenna Cup =

Tournament details
- Province: Ulster
- Year: 2007

The 2007 Dr McKenna Cup was a Gaelic football competition played under the auspices of Ulster GAA.

== Summary ==
Tyrone were eventually declared the winning team at official level, though the victory was tarnished by their choice of tactics. The team was at one point stripped of the cup for breaking the rules.

They defeated Donegal in the final; however they did so in controversial circumstances while fielding ineligible players and midfielder Kevin Hughes was shown a red card. A month-long dispute over the player eligibility issue ensued, with the matter coming before the Ulster Council. Tyrone were allowed to keep the cup, even though they had earlier been deducted points for exactly the same offence, though not enough to prevent them from winning their group and eliminate them from the competition.

In the 2008 semi-finals Donegal defeated Armagh and Tyrone defeated Monaghan. The Ulster Council had earlier declared UUJ as semi-finalists in place of Monaghan but they later redid their calculations correctly.

The tournament also saw former Fermanagh star Rory Gallagher make a substitute appearance and score a late point for Cavan in their victory over Queen's University Belfast.

== See also ==
- 2007 O'Byrne Cup
