= Martin McElhinney =

Donegal Gaelic footballer (born 1988)

Personal information
- Native name: Máirtín Mac Giolla Chainnigh (Irish)
- Born: 10 August 1988 (age 38) County Donegal
- Occupation: Student
- Height: 6 ft 2 in (188 cm)

Sport
- Sport: Gaelic football
- Position: Midfield
Club
- Years: Club
- ?–: St Michael's
Inter-county
Years	County	Apps (scores)
2007–2019	Donegal	104
Inter-county titles
- Ulster titles: 4
- All-Irelands: 1

Martin McElhinney (born 10 August 1988) is an Irish Gaelic footballer who plays for St Michael's and also, formerly, for the Donegal county team (between 2007 and 2019).

Among other accolades, he has one All-Ireland Senior Football Championship title and four Ulster Senior Football Championship titles to his name. He is from Creeslough.

== Playing career ==
=== Club and college ===
McElhinney's club reached the final of the 2011 Donegal Senior Football Championship— their first ever senior final—but lost, though McElhinney scored during the game.

McElhinney also played for DCU.

=== Inter-county ===
McElhinney scored two goals for Donegal at Croke Park in the 2006 Ulster Minor Football Championship final, which Donegal won.

He made his debut at senior inter-county level under the management of Brian McIver in 2007.

By the time of Jim McGuinness's arrival as manager, McElhinney was still part of the team. Against Derry in the 2011 Ulster Senior Football Championship final, Rory Kavanagh went off injured late in the first half and McElhinney replaced him. In the 2012 Ulster final against Down, his appearance as a second-half substitute was credited with being vital to the victory. He started Donegal's next game, a comprehensive All-Ireland Senior Football Championship quarter-final defeat of Kerry at Croke Park. He came on as a second-half substitute for Patrick McBrearty in the 2012 All-Ireland Senior Football Championship final, won by Donegal. He was treated like a VIP when himself and Maxi Curran brought the Sam Maguire Cup to Mulroy College in Milford.

McElhinney started Rory Gallagher's first match in charge of the county, a 2015 Dr McKenna Cup away defeat to Derry. He came on a substitute in the first match of the 2015 National Football League (also against Derry but at home), contributing 0–1 to the team's victory. He also made a substitute appearances in the next game against Dublin at Croke Park, the third fixture against Cork in Ballyshannon and the fourth fixture against Monaghan. He started the fifth fixture against Kerry at Austin Stack Park and contributed 0–1. He started the sixth fixture against Tyrone and scored 0–2 in what RTÉ described as an "impressive" performance. He followed this up with a further point in the seventh fixture against Mayo. Donegal qualified for the NFL semi-final. McElhinney started and scored 0–2.

McElhinney started the 2015 Ulster Senior Football Championship final. He had previously started the preliminary round against Tyrone (scoring 1–2), the quarter-final against Armagh (scoring 0–1) and the semi-final against Derry (scoring 0–1). McElhinney made substitute appearances in the 2015 All-Ireland Senior Football Championship qualifier defeat of Galway at Croke Park and the next game against Mayo at the same venue.

McElhinney made a substitute appearance in the second fixture of the 2016 National Football League against Cork, a ten-point win in Ballyshannon. He also made substitute appearances in the third and fourth fixtures against Mayo and Kerry. He started the fifth fixture against Roscommon. Another substitute appearance followed in the next game away to Dublin at Croke Park, during which James McCarthy used his left hand to seemingly gouge McElhinney's eye. McCarthy, who had actually just been shown a red card before he did this, escaped punishment and Dublin manager Jim Gavin said: "To be suggesting there was something malicious, I don't think that's very fair". The Irish Independent called for McCarthy to be investigated. But the incident was dismissed as a push by Setanta Sports pundits Senan Connell (former Dublin player) and former Armagh player Aaron Kernan dismissed the incident as a push. McElhinney started the seventh fixture away to Monaghan in Castleblayney and scored a goal. Donegal qualified for the NFL semi-final. McElhinney also started this game, scoring a point.

McElhinney made a substitute appearance in the 2016 Ulster Senior Football Championship final. He had previously started the quarter-final against Fermanagh (scoring 0–1), the semi-final against Monaghan and the semi-final replay against the same opposition (scoring 0–1). McElhinney also started the 2016 All-Ireland Senior Football Championship qualifier defeat of Cork at Croke Park and the next game against Dublin at the same venue.

McElhinney made a late substitute appearance in the fifth fixture of the 20017 National Football League against Tyrone. He made further substitute appearances in the sixth and seventh fixtures against Monaghan and Mayo.

McElhinney made substitute appearances in the 2017 Ulster Senior Football Championship quarter-final victory against Antrim and semi-final loss to Tyrone. He made a further substitute appearance in the 2017 All-Ireland Senior Football Championship qualifier defeat of Meath at Páirc Tailteann. He then made a substitute appearance in the qualifier loss to Galway at Markievicz Park and scored 0–1.

Under the management of Declan Bonner, McElhinney made his 100th appearance for Donegal against Cavan in the 2019 Dr McKenna Cup. Following Donegal's victory over Armagh in the 2019 National Football League, McElhinney informed Bonner of his decision to withdraw from inter-county football. He had been an unused substitute in that game and the game before, though he had played in three earlier games of that year's league. These were a substitute appearance in the opening fixture of the competition against Clare in Ennis, Meath in the second fixture (starting then making way for Jason McGee), and again as a substitute, on this occasion for Oisín Gallen, in the third fixture against Tipperary.

== Personal life ==
McElhinney has also played association football for Fanad United in the Ulster Senior League.

== Honours ==
Donegal

- All-Ireland Senior Football Championship: 2012
- Ulster Senior Football Championship: 2011, 2012, 2014, 2018
- National Football League Division 2: 2011
- Ulster Minor Football Championship: 2006
