= Allenwood G.F.C. =

Gaelic games club in County Kildare, Ireland

Allenwood
- Fiodh Almhaine
- Founded: 1956
- County: Kildare
- Nickname: The Blues
- Colours: Sky Blue & Navy Blue
- Grounds: Sean Tierney Park, Station Road, Allenwood
- Coordinates: 53.28928°N 6.88229°W

Playing kits
Standard colours

Senior Club Championships
	All Ireland	Leinster champions	Kildare champions
Football:	0	0	1

Allenwood G.F.C. is a Gaelic football club based in Allenwood, County Kildare, Ireland. Because it is located in County Kildare, the club competes in the County Kildare GAA board league and cup system. Allenwood was the winner of the Kildare Senior Football Championship in 2004 and Club of the Year in 1974. It was the home club of former Kildare Player of the Year Johnny Doyle.

== Notable players ==
- Johnny Doyle
- Shane McCormack

== Honours ==
- Kildare Senior Football Championship (1): 2004
- Senior League Champions (4): 1964, 1993, 2002, 2004
- Kildare Intermediate Football Championship (3): 1962, 1990, 2023
- Leinster Intermediate Club Football Championship (1): 2023
- Kildare Junior Football Championship (1): 1961

== Bibliography ==
- Kildare GAA: A Centenary History, by Eoghan Corry, CLG Chill Dara, 1984, ISBN 0-9509370-0-2 hb ISBN 0-9509370-1-0 pb
- Kildare GAA yearbook, 1972, 1974, 1978, 1979, 1980 and 2000- in sequence especially the Millennium yearbook of 2000
- Soaring Sliothars: Centenary of Kildare Camogie 1904-2004 by Joan O'Flynn Kildare County Camogie Board.
