= 2013 Donegal Senior Football Championship =

- 2013 Craobh Sinsear Peile; Dhún na nGall

Tournament details
- County: Donegal
- Year: 2013

Winners
- Champions: Glenswilly (2nd win)
- Manager: Gary McDaid
- Captain: James Pat McDaid

Promotion/Relegation
- Promoted team(s): Naomh Muire
- Relegated team(s): Cloich Cheann Fhaola

The 2013 Donegal Senior Football Championship was the 91st official edition of the Donegal GAA's premier club Gaelic football tournament for senior graded teams in County Donegal.

Brian McEniff managed Réalt na Mara in the competition, taking over from Joe Keeney after his resignation and filling the position in his 71st year.

== Format ==
The old format, which involved a two-legged first round, was scrapped in favour of an opening round containing four groups of four clubs, played out as a league, and with one team relegated. Two of the four teams in each group advanced to the quarter-finals after each have played the others once.

Teams finishing bottom of their group played two relegation semi-finals. The losing relegation semi-final teams met in the relegation final. The losing team was relegated to the Donegal Intermediate Football Championship to be replaced either by the Intermediate Championship winning team or the team finishing seventh in the All-County League Division Two. The match schedule was released in March 2013 and matches began over the June Bank Holiday weekend.

Donegal captain Michael Murphy begged the Donegal County Board to reconsider the scheduling of the Donegal SFC, as his team set out to defend the Sam Maguire Cup. Murphy described it as "probably not ideal from our situation", and despaired over "the hand we're dealt with" but said he would "like them to look after us in that way". They didn't.

== Draw ==
The draw for the first round, made at the RTÉ Raidió na Gaeltachta studios in Derrybeg in February 2013, produced a "group of death", with only two from Glenwilly, St Michael's and Cill Chartha progressing to the quarter-finals. The 2012 finalists St Eunan's and Naomh Conaill were also placed in the same group.

== Results ==
=== Group stage ===
Four Masters, St Michael's and Naomh Conaill, considered "big guns", failed to progress from their respective groups.

Qualifies for quarter-finals
Play-off for relegation to Intermediate Championship

==== A ====
Team	Pld	W	D	L	F	A	Diff	Pts
St Eunan's	2	2	0	0	4–27	2–15	18	4
Malin	2	1	1	0	0–26	1–15	8	3
Naomh Conaill	2	1	1	1	2–16	2–21	-5	3
Cloich Cheann Fhaola	2	0	0	2	1–14	2–32	-21	0

==== B ====
Team	Pld	W	D	L	F	A	Diff	Pts
Seán Mac Cumhaills	0	0	0	0	0–0	0–0	0	0
Ard an Rátha	0	0	0	0	0–0	0–0	0	0
Four Masters	0	0	0	0	0–0	0–0	0	0
Glenfin	0	0	0	0	0–0	0–0	0	0

==== C ====
Team	Pld	W	D	L	F	A	Diff	Pts
Gaoth Dobhair	0	0	0	0	0–0	0–0	0	0
Na Cealla Beaga	0	0	0	0	0–0	0–0	0	0
Termon	0	0	0	0	0–0	0–0	0	0
An Clochán Liath	0	0	0	0	0–0	0–0	0	0

==== D ====
Team	Pld	W	D	L	F	A	Diff	Pts
Cill Chartha	2	2	0	0	1–30	3–21	+3	4
Glenswilly	2	1	0	1	5–20	0–23	+12	2
St Michael's	2	0	1	1	1–24	2–23	-2	1
Réalt na Mara	2	0	1	1	1–16	3–23	-13	1

==== Relegation semi-finals ====
Réalt na Mara	v	Glenfin

Cloich Cheann Fhaola	v	An Clochán Liath

==== Relegation final ====
v

=== Knock-out stage ===
Quarter-finals	Semi-finals	Final
Seán Mac Cumhaills
Na Cealla Beaga	Malainn
Malainn	Na Cealla Beaga
Naomh Adhamhnáin		Na Cealla Beaga
Gaoth Dobhair		Glenswilly
Ard an Rátha	Glenswilly
Glenswilly	Ard an Rátha
Cill Chartha

==== Quarter-finals ====
The draw for the quarter-finals took place on RTÉ Raidió na Gaeltachta on 9 July, upon the completion of the group stage. All four group winners from the first round were defeated at the quarter-final stage, including defending champions St Eunan's.

Malin	v	St Eunan's

Cill Chartha	v	Glenswilly

Seán Mac Cumhaills	v	Na Cealla Beaga

Ard an Rátha	v	Gaoth Dobhair

==== Semi-finals ====
The draw for the semi-finals was made in Letterkenny on 15 September 2013.

Na Cealla Beaga	0-11 - 1-07	Malin

Glenswilly	1-14 - 0-16	Ard an Rátha

==== Final ====
Ahead of the final Glenswilly player and Donegal captain Michael Murphy was named Ireland captain for the 2013 International Rules Series, creating a dilemma for the young pup and giving the Donegal County Board a headache due a fixture clash. The Donegal County Board ultimately decided not to move the final. Murphy did not captain Glenswilly; this honour fell to James Pat McDaid. Séamus Coleman attended the final.

20 October 2013; Final	Na Cealla Beaga	2-6 - 3-19	Glenswilly	Ballybofey; Referee: I Molloy (Glenties); Man of the Match: Michael Murphy
20 October 2013; Final	H McFadden 1-3 (3fs), C Murrin 1-0, D Conwell, B Boyle, B Faherty 0-1 each	Report	M Murphy 1-5 (1-0 pen, 5fs), G McFadden 0-7 (5fs), C Bonner, N Gallagher 1-1 each, K McFadden 0-2, Caolan Kelly, R Crawford, D McGinley 0-1 each.	Ballybofey; Referee: I Molloy (Glenties); Man of the Match: Michael Murphy
