= Gary McDaid =

Gaelic football manager

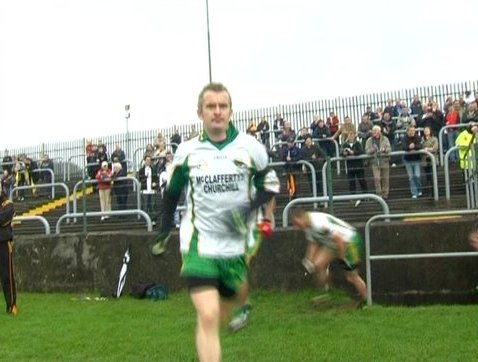

Personal information
- Occupation: Teacher

Sport
- Sport: Gaelic football
Club management
- Years: Club
- 2011 2013 2023–: Glenswilly; Glenswilly; Glenswilly
Inter-county management
- Years: Team
- 2017–2019: Donegal U20s

Gary McDaid is a Gaelic football manager and referee. As a club coach and manager, he contributed to three Donegal Senior Football Championship wins for Glenswilly GAA: twice as manager or joint-manager (2011, 2013) and once as coach to Michael Canning (2016).

== Club ==
As a manager and coach of Glenswilly, he helped that team to two Donegal Senior Football Championships (2011 and 2013). During the 2011 season, McDaid criticised the county board for some scheduling decisions.

He did not manage the team in 2012, and played with the club's reserves. Returning as manager in 2013, the club won the All-County Football League Division Two title. McDaid was part of Michael Canning's backroom team in 2016 as Glenswilly won their third county title.

As of 2019, McDaid was registered as a referee.

McDaid was appointed to manage Glenswilly again in December 2023.

== County ==
McDaid was involved in coaching Donegal underage squads and worked under Joe McBrearty with Donegal's under-21 football team. In December 2014, McDaid joined the senior Donegal county team as a selector under manager Rory Gallagher. He stayed for one season, standing aside from the role in October 2015, citing family commitments.

In August 2017, some outlets included McDaid in list of potential candidates to succeed Gallagher as Donegal senior manager. He was not selected for the post and in November 2017 McDaid took the managerial role with Donegal's new under-20 football team. Eamon McGee and Brian Roper were in his back-room team. He continued as the under-20 manager in 2018.

McDaid resigned in September 2019, stating that "results had not been as good as they had hoped". To complete an expected third year in the role, he would reportedly have needed to "face an interview for a post he already he held [sic]".

== Media ==
Writing ahead of the 2020 Donegal Senior Football Championship, Gerry McLaughlin of Donegallive.ie wrote of McDaid that: "There are few more articulate, astute or acute observers of Donegal GAA than one Gary McDaid from Glenswilly. He will always be remembered for masterminding a great victory for the Glen over hot favourites Kilcar in the county final of 2016".

In 2016, in response to criticism of Glenswilly's performance in a low-scoring game, McDaid reportedly hit out at what he described as "armchair critics".

== Personal life ==
As of 2013, McDaid was teaching PE at St Eunan's College.
