= 2011 Donegal Senior Football Championship =

- 2011 Craobh Sinsear Peile; Dhún na nGall

Tournament details
- County: Donegal
- Year: 2011

Winners
- Champions: Glenswilly (1st win)
- Manager: Gary McDaid
- Captain: Gary McFadden

Promotion/Relegation
- Promoted team(s): ?
- Relegated team(s): N/A

The 2011 Donegal Senior Football Championship was the 89th official edition of the Donegal GAA's premier club Gaelic football tournament for senior graded teams in County Donegal.

Glenswilly won the final, for the club's first ever title. St Michael's also made a first final appearance.

== First round ==
The first round draw was made at the RTÉ Raidió na Gaeltachta studios in Derrybeg.

A brawl among dozens of people after the game between Naomh Conaill and Glenswilly at Davy Brennan Memorial Park led to Leo McLoone breaking several bones in his face, and the Donegal Competition's Controls Committee (CCC) launching an investigation. McLoone had to have surgery to have a plate put into his eye socket.

Malin	v	Glenfin

Gaoth Dobhair	v	Termon

An Clochán Liath	v	St Eunan's

Seán Mac Cumhaills	v	St Michael's

Glenswilly	v	Naomh Conaill

Na Cealla Beaga	v	Cill Chartha

Ard an Rátha	v	Cloich Cheann Fhaola

Réalt na Mara	v	Four Masters

== Quarter-finals ==
St Michael's	1-14 to 1-10	Gaoth Dobhair	Falcarragh

Glenfin	2-6 to 0-11	Four Masters	Ballybofey

Ard an Rátha	2-7 to 3-8	Cill Chartha	Killybegs

Glenswilly	0-9 to 0-9 (R) 1-9 to 0-8	St Eunan's	Ballybofey

== Semi-finals ==
Glenswilly and St Michael's won the semi-finals.

St Michael's	2-15 to 1-5	Glenfin	Letterkenny

Glenswilly	1-7 to 0-7	Cill Chartha	Ballybofey

== Final ==
The Final, broadcast on TG4 and contested by Glenswilly and St Michael's, produced a novel pairing, as neither side had ever won before, and they had only one losing final appearance between them, that of Glenswilly in 2007. Members of the winning team would each receive a personalised medal engraved with both their name and number from county final day.

Glenswilly prevailed on the day, winning the final at MacCumhaill Park in Ballybofey. Michael Murphy scored all but one point of the winning team's total.

2 October 2011	Glenswilly	1-8 - 0-9	St Michael's	MacCumhaill Park, Ballybofey; Referee: Jimmy White (Killybegs)
2 October 2011	M. Murphy 1-7 (0-3f, 0-1 '45'), J. P. McDaid 0-1		C. McFadden 0-3 (1f), C. Toye 0-3, M. McElhinney 0-1, D. McLaughlin 0-1, S. Coyle 0-1 (f)	MacCumhaill Park, Ballybofey; Referee: Jimmy White (Killybegs)
