= Malin GAA =

Donegal-based Gaelic games club

Malin
- CLG Malainn
- County: Donegal
- Colours: Black and amber
- Grounds: Connolly Park

Playing kits
Standard colours

Senior Club Championships
| | All Ireland | Ulster champions | Donegal champions |
|---|---|---|---|
| Football: | - | - | – |

Malin GAA is a Gaelic games club based in Malin in County Donegal, Ireland.

It is the northernmost GAA club in Ireland. This tends to cause logistical struggles during the league as many of their rivals are a great distance away. One example of the distance travelled would be the 320-kilometre round trip required to play an away fixture to Naomh Columba.

== History ==
The club participated in the Donegal Senior Football Championship from 2004 onwards.

It was also club of the year in 2003.

Declan Walsh, a member of the 2012 All-Ireland winning county team, played for them.

The club is also home to 2012's "Number One Real Supporter", according to a national survey.

Liam Bradley, previously manager of the Antrim county football team, was an unexpected managerial appointment by the club in January 2015. He left the same year.

The 2019 Donegal Senior Football Championship resulted in the club's descent to the intermediate ranks.

The club contested the 2023 Donegal Intermediate Football Championship final, losing to Na Dúnaibh.

== Notable players ==
- Declan Walsh — 2012 All-Ireland SFC winner; 2011, 2012, and 2014 Ulster SFC winner; 2010 Ulster Under-21 Football Championship winner; 2006 Ulster MFC winner

== Managers ==
| Years | Manager |
|---|---|
| 19??–c. 2012? | — |
| c. 2012–c. 2014 | Terence Colhoun |
| 2015 | Liam Bradley |
| 2015/6?–2018 | Terence Colhoun |
| 2018–2??? | Robert Farren |
| c. 2022– | Michael Byrne |
