= Glenswilly GAA =

Donegal-based Gaelic games club

- CLG Gleann tSúilí
- Founded: 1982
- County: Donegal
- Nickname: The Men from the Glen; The Glen men
- Colours: Green, white and yellow
- Grounds: Pairc Naomh Columba

Playing kits
Standard colours

Glenswilly GAA (Irish: CLG Gleann tSúilí) is a GAA club based in Glenswilly, County Donegal, Ireland. Most noted for winning the Donegal Senior Football Championship in 2011, 2013 and 2016, the team has fielded players like All-Ireland winning captain Michael Murphy.

== History ==
The present club was founded in 1982. A teenage Manus McFadden arranged a meeting at Foxhall of Glenswillyites who were interested in forming a team, with John Mc Ginley, Roger McDaid, Fr Eamon Crossan, Finbar Glackin, Jimmy Joe McGinley and chair Eddie McDevitt.

Glenswilly reached their first ever Senior county final in 2007, where they lost to near neighbours St Eunan's 0–12 to 1–3.

In 2011, they won the Donegal Senior Football Championship for the first time, with a 1–8 to 0–9 defeat of St Michael's in the final.

On 25 September 2012, the Donegal senior team—fresh from winning the 2012 All-Ireland Senior Football Championship final—were scheduled to visit Glenswilly; however, the visit was postponed due to time constraints which arose due to the huge crowds around the county eager to catch a glimpse of the team. The team eventually visited Glenswilly on 27 September.

In 2013, the club rebuffed allegations that they forced children into GAA jerseys. Later that year they hosted the 2013 All-Ireland Football Series launch, held following confirmation of the four provincial winners. That year they won their second Donegal Senior Football Championship and progressed to the final of the Ulster Senior Club Football Championship, which they lost to Ballinderry.

The club won its third and final Donegal SFC in 2016.

By 2020, Neil Gallagher, Ciaran Bonner, Darren Mc Ginley and Joe Gibbons (all three-time SFC winners) had retired.

The club commemorated forty years in existence with a year-long event in 2022.

== Non-playing personnel ==
Position	Staff
Manager	Gary McDaid

Last updated: 16 July 2020

== Managers ==
Years	Manager
1982–c. 1998?	—N/a
1999	Finbar Glackin
2000	Finbar Glackin and Denis McGrenra
2001	Brian McHugh and Brendan Walsh
2002–2003	Philim Molloy and Peter McFadden
2004–2008	Francie Martin
2009	Barry O'Hagan / John McGinley
2010–2011	Gary McDaid and John McGinley
2012	Manus McFadden
2013–2014	Gary McDaid
2015–2016	Michael Canning
2017	Aidy Glackin
2018–2019	Brendan Walsh and Ryan McKinley
2020–2023	Pauric Bonner
2023–	Gary McDaid

== Notable players ==
- Ciaran Bonner — 2007 NFL winner
- Neil Gallagher — 2007 NFL-winning captain and 2012 All-Ireland winner
- James Pat McDaid — Glenswilly senior team captain 2013
- Gary McFadden — member of the 2012 All-Ireland panel; Glenswilly senior team captain 2011, 2016
- Michael Murphy — 2012 All-Ireland winning captain

== Other figures ==
- Manus Kelly — led Glenswilly to a Senior C Championship win in 2016
- Michael McGeehin — 2000 JFL trainer
- Shane Williams — Welsh rugby union player

== Honours ==
=== Football ===
- Ulster Senior Club Football Championship:
  - Runner-up (1): 2013
- Donegal Senior Football Championship:
  - Winner (3): 2011, 2013, 2016
  - Runner-up (2): 2007, 2014
- Ulster Intermediate Club Football Championship:
  - Runner-up (1): 2005
- Donegal Intermediate Football Championship:
  - Winner (1): 2005
- Donegal Senior B Football Championship:
  - Winner (1): 2015.
  - Donegal Senior C Football Championship:
  - Winners (2): 2016, 2017
- Donegal Junior A&B Football Championship:
  - Runner-up (1): Junior A Finalists 2000
  - Winner (1): Junior B Champions 1984
  - Runner-up (1): Junior B Finalists 1988, 2014
- Donegal All County League Divisions:
  - Winner (2): Division Two 2007, 2013
  - Winner (3): Division Four 1989, 1993, 2000
- Comortas Peile Na Gaeltacht Tir Conaill:
  - Winner (1): 2011

=== Other ===
- Donegal Ladies Intermediate Football Championship:
  - Winner (1): 2007
- Donegal Ladies Junior Championship:
  - Winner (1): 2006
- Donegal Ladies Junior B Championship:
  - Winner (1): 2017
  - Runner-up (1) 2016
