= St Michael's GAA (Donegal) =

Donegal-based Gaelic games club

St Michael's
- CLG Naomh Mícheál
- Founded: 1952
- County: Donegal
- Nickname: Bridgemen
- Colours: Red and White
- Grounds: The Bridge
- Coordinates: 55.1825, -7.9882

Playing kits
Standard colours

St Michael's (CLG Naomh Mícheál) is a GAA club based in Creeslough/Dunfanaghy in County Donegal. Located in the north of the county, the club is affected by rural issues such as low population and emigration; despite this they play at the top level in the Donegal Senior Football Championship and opened a new clubhouse in 2010. The club colours are red and white.

The club plays at the Bridge in Dunfanaghy.

The club has rivalries with Cloich Cheann Fhaola, CLG Na nDúnaibh and Glenswilly.

== History ==
The club was founded in 1952. The club was previously known as the Creeslough Dunfanaghy GAA club. They won the Donegal Junior Football Championship twice in 1983 & 1992. In 2003 they won the Donegal Intermediate Football Championship. They then went on to become Ulster champions and reached the inaugural all-Ireland Intermediate football championship final where they were beaten by Ilen Rovers GAA of Cork.

The club won the all county league in 2015 under manager Éamonn Harkin. The club reached the final of the 2004 All-Ireland Intermediate Club Football Championship. St. Michael's also reached the final of the 2011 Donegal Senior Football Championship, only to lose to Glenswilly. This was their first final appearance at senior level. They have since featured in 6 semi-finals but have ultimately failed to reach another final since, recently falling to An Clochán Liath by a point in the 2024 Donegal Senior Football Championship and Gaoth Dobhair by six in the 2025 Donegal Senior Football Championship. They have, however, shown promise in recent years defeating 3 of the so-called "Big Four" in the championship in the 2024 & 2025 seasons having not done so for the previous 10 years.

They contributed six players to the Donegal county team that won the 2012 All-Ireland Senior Football Championship final at Croke Park, including Colm McFadden, who scored a goal in the final and ended the season as top scorer. He also went on to win an all star and was nominated for player of the year which some considered him unfortunate not to win, pipped by teammate Karl Lacey, possibly due to Donegal's emphasis on defence throughout their successful campaign. Christy Toye, considered one of the most skilful and exciting players of his era, was another key St Michaels player in the 2012 winning side. Despite his injuries and unfortunate medical condition diagnosis, Toye played for his county for 15 years, and for his club until he was 38. At the time of his retirement he was the leading goal scorer for Donegal in Croke park.

2014 European Ryder Cup captain Paul McGinley used to play for the club.

== Notable players ==
- Michael Langan — 2018, 2019, 2024 and 2025 Ulster SFC winner
- Martin McElhinney — 2012 All-Ireland SFC winner
- Colm McFadden — 2012 All-Ireland SFC winner and All-Ireland SFC top scorer
- Antoin McFadden — 2012 All-Ireland SFC winner
- Mark Anthony McGinley — Donegal goalkeeper 2015–19
- Brian McLaughlin — former Donegal player & current Donegal masters captain
- Daniel McLaughlin — 2012 All-Ireland SFC winner
- Christy Toye — 2012 All-Ireland SFC winner
- Peter Witherow — 2012 All-Ireland SFC winner

== Managers ==
Years	Manager
1952–?	[Michael Gallagher]
?	Danny Lafferty
?-2016	Éamonn Harkin
2017	Declan Bonner
2018	Michael Kelly
2019-2020	Gary O'Neill
2021	Daniel McLaughlin
2022–2024	Raymond McLaughlin & Cathal Sweeney
2025	Daniel McLaughlin & Martin McElhinney
2026-	Raymond McLaughlin & Cathal Sweeney

== Honours ==
- Donegal All-County League winners
- Donegal Senior Football Championship runner-up: 2011
- All-Ireland Intermediate Club Football Championship runner-up: 2004
- Ulster Intermediate Club Football Championship: 2003
- Donegal Intermediate Football Championship: 2003
- Donegal Junior Football Championship: 1983, 1992
