= 2014 All-Ireland Senior Football Championship final =

2014 All-Ireland Football Championship final
- Event: 2014 All-Ireland Senior Football Championship
Kerry	Donegal
2–9 (15)	0–12 (12)
- Date: 21 September 2014
- Venue: Croke Park, Dublin
- Man of the Match: Paul Murphy
- Referee: Eddie Kinsella (Laois)
- Weather: Partly cloudy 17 °C (63 °F)

The 2014 All-Ireland Football Championship final, the culmination of the 2014 All-Ireland Senior Football Championship, was played at Croke Park in Dublin on 21 September 2014. Ulster champions Donegal, last champions in 2012 took on Munster champions Kerry, last champions in 2009.

Both sides defeated the previous year's finalists, Dublin and Mayo, in their semi-finals to set up this match between "the two great football outposts of the west-coast extremities". This was their first encounter on All-Ireland final day, and only the second in 127 years of championship history, Donegal having defeated Kerry in their previous encounter at the 2012 quarter-final stage. Kerry narrowly won a close game which ended with a scoreline of 2–9 to 0–12.

The game was televised nationally on RTÉ2 as part of The Sunday Game live programme, presented by Michael Lyster from Croke Park, with studio analysis from Joe Brolly, Ciarán Whelan and Colm O'Rourke — the last time until 2019 that the Brolly-O'Rourke-Pat Spillane axis was broken up for live coverage of an All-Ireland SFC final.

== Paths to the final ==
Donegal defeated Derry, Antrim and Monaghan to win the Ulster Senior Football Championship. They defeated Armagh in the All-Ireland SFC quarter-final and the reigning champions Dublin in the semi-final. Kerry defeated Clare and Cork to win the Munster Senior Football Championship. They overcame Galway in the All-Ireland SFC quarter-final and Mayo in the semi-final, after a replay which went to extra time.

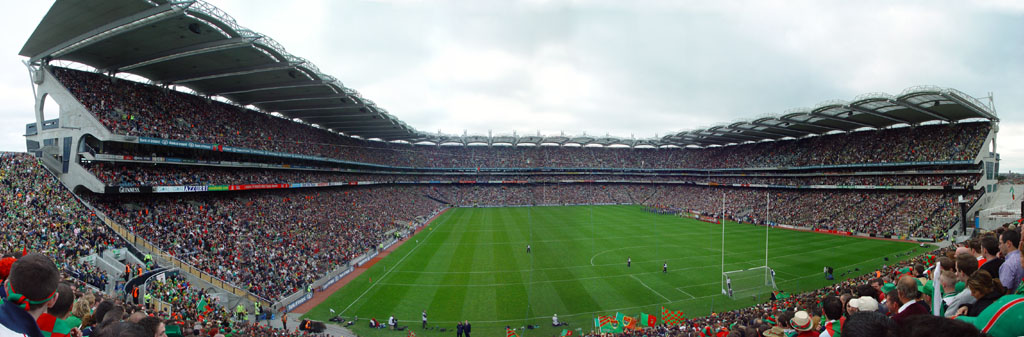
A panorama of Croke Park on All-Ireland SFC final day ten years previously

== Tickets ==
Demand for tickets was even higher than the 2012 All-Ireland Senior Football Championship final. Alan Milton, the GAA's Head of Media Relations, said he believed the stadium could have been sold out two times over. The reasons he suggested for this included, "a) it's a novel pairing b) the semi-finals were of a such a high standard that there's big neutral interest and c) the numbers from each county who will travel back to Ireland – both Kerry and Donegal have a very strong overseas presence in the United States particularly but also farther afield.".

== Kits ==
After Donegal's defeat of All-Ireland champions Dublin confirmed the teams for the final, there was speculation that the counties would wear alternative kits due to the similarities in their traditional county colours. The last time this had occurred on All-Ireland Final day was 2010 when Cork and Down came to a similar arrangement to what occurred when they played in a semi-final of the 1994 All-Ireland Senior Football Championship. 2010 represented the first occasion since Kerry and Offaly played in the 1982 final that both teams playing in an All-Ireland SFC final donned alternative strips, while the 1996 final was the last time one team (Meath) wore an alternative strip (versus Mayo). In the event, on 2 September 2014, it was announced that Donegal and Kerry would wear their traditional jerseys.

== Team selection ==
Both teams announced two changes to their starting line-ups.

Kerry announced their team on 18 September, with Marc Ó Sé being recalled to the starting line-up and Kieran Donaghy starting at full-forward. Stephen O'Brien came into the half forward line in place of Michael Geaney. Donegal announced their team on 20 September, with Christy Toye and Patrick McBrearty in for Rory Kavanagh and David Walsh. On the day, Toye and McBrearty were named on the bench – though both featured, and indeed scored, later in the game – while Kavanagh and Darach O'Connor started in their place.

Six players from the 2006 All-Ireland Minor Football Championship semi-final meeting of the counties at Croke Park featured in the 2014 senior final. These were Michael Murphy, Leo McLoone and Martin McElhinney (Donegal) and Shane Enright, David Moran and Johnny Buckley (Kerry).

== Match ==
=== Summary ===
Kerry player Paul Geaney scored a goal within 60 seconds of the throw-in. Afterwards, a couple of points by both teams kept it a close game with Kerry always up a point or two. Near the end of the first half, Donegal tied it up. After a minute of extra time in the first half, it was 1–3 Kerry to 0–6 Donegal at half-time.

Heading into the second half, Donegal took the lead with another point from team captain Michael Murphy, but Kerry quickly answered. Kerry eventually built a small lead and with a one-point lead at ten minutes left, Kerry scored a goal making it 2–6 to 0–8. Donegal responded with three quick points making it 2–6 to 0–11. Kerry hit a couple points in response, and it was 2–8 to 0–12 when two minutes of injury time started. Kerry scored another point to extend their lead to three points. Donegal almost forced a replay when Colm McFadden hit the goalpost in the last minute but Kerry clung on the win by 2–9 to 0–12.

=== Details ===
21 September 2014

Donegal	0–12 – 2–9	Kerry
M. Murphy (0–4, 3 frees); C. McFadden (0–1, 1 free); P. McBrearty (0–2); O. Mac Niallais (0–1); K. Lacey (0–1); N. McGee (0–1); D. Molloy (0–1); C. Toye (0–1)	Report	P. Geaney (1–2, 1 free); K. Donaghy (1–2); B. J. Keane (0–2, 2 frees); P. Murphy (0–1); B. Sheehan (0–1, 1 free); J. Buckley (0–1)

Croke Park, Dublin
Attendance: 82,184
Referee: Eddie Kinsella (Laois)

Donegal	Kerry

Donegal:
1	Paul Durcan
2	Eamon McGee
3	Neil McGee
4	Paddy McGrath
5	Anthony Thompson
6	Karl Lacey
7	Frank McGlynn
8	Neil Gallagher
26	Rory Kavanagh	(substituted off) 64'
9	Odhrán Mac Niallais	(substituted off) 52'
11	Leo McLoone	(substituted off) 57'
12	Ryan McHugh	(substituted off) 46'
15	Colm McFadden
14	Michael Murphy (c)
17	Darach O'Connor	(substituted off) 28'
Substitutes:
10	Christy Toye	(substituted on) 28'
13	Patrick McBrearty	(substituted on) 46'
24	Martin McElhinney	(substituted on) 52'
18	David Walsh	(substituted on) 57'
20	Dermot "Brick" Molloy	(substituted on) 64'
Manager:
Jim McGuinness

Kerry:
1	Brian Kelly
2	Marc Ó Sé
3	Aidan O'Mahony
4	Fionn Fitzgerald (c)	(substituted off) 55'
5	Paul Murphy
6	Peter Crowley
7	Killian Young
8	Anthony Maher		Yellow card
9	David Moran	(substituted off) 68'
10	Stephen O'Brien	(substituted off) 36'	Yellow card
11	Johnny Buckley		(red card) B
12	Donnchadh Walsh	(substituted off) 57'
13	Paul Geaney	(substituted off) 49'
14	Kieran Donaghy	(substituted off) 70'
15	James O'Donoghue
Substitutes Used:
18	Michael Geaney	(substituted on) 36'
21	Barry John Keane	(substituted on) 49'
17	Shane Enright	(substituted on) 55'
19	Declan O'Sullivan	(substituted on) 57'
20	Bryan Sheehan	(substituted on) 68'
23	Kieran O'Leary	(substituted on) 70'
Manager:
É. Fitzmaurice

Linesmen:
Marty Duffy (Sligo)
Pádraig Hughes (Armagh)

Sideline Official
Rory Hickey (Clare)

== Celebrations ==
The Kerry team celebrated the night of the final at the Clyde Court Hotel where Paul Murphy received his man of the match award. The next day the team departed Heuston Station at 1.45 pm for their first stop at Rathmore for the homecoming celebrations before proceeding to Tralee at 6.10 pm and then on to Killarney at 9.00 pm.

== Broadcasting ==
The match was broadcast live internationally.

(Republic of Ireland) RTÉ Sport

(Australia) Seven Network

(England) Sky Sports

(Northern Ireland) BBC

(Scotland) Sky Sports

(Wales) Sky Sports
