= Naoise Ó Baoill =

Irish-Japanese Gaelic footballer and Australian rules footballer

Personal information
- Born: 1997 (age 28–29) Letterkenny, County Donegal
- Height: 5 ft 5 in (165 cm)

Sport
- Sport: Gaelic football
- Position: Centre half forward
Club
- Years: Club
- ?–: Gaoth Dobhair
Club titles
- Donegal titles: 1
- Ulster titles: 1
Inter-county
- Years: County
- 2017: Donegal

Naoise Ó Baoill (born 1997) is an Irish-Japanese Gaelic footballer, reared in Japan and Australia and who plays for Gaoth Dobhair. He formerly played for the Donegal county team. He has also played Australian rules football and association football in the past.

== Early life ==
Born in Letterkenny, County Donegal, Ó Baoill's mother, Kumi, is Japanese and he spent much of his early childhood in her home country. He has two siblings, both of whom were born in Tokyo. His father Colm, an Irishman originally from Bóthar na Trá in Machaire Chlochair, got a job in Australia and the family moved there in 1998.

Ó Baoill preferred playing association football while living there and admired the Liverpool and England player Steven Gerrard; however, he showed some interest in playing Australian rules football as well. The family moved from Sydney to Gaoth Dobhair in 2009 when Ó Baoill was twelve. His father is close to the father of Odhrán Mac Niallais and Ó Baoill was thus often at Mac Niallais's house from a young age. He is also a cousin of Gaoth Dobhair and Donegal player Daire Ó Baoill. Though involved in playing association football for Letterkenny Rovers, Ó Baoill was drawn towards Gaelic football when he played his first game against Termon at under-14 level on the grounds of a Letterkenny school. He later recalled:

I didn't know what was going on… it took me a while. It was hard to adapt. The weather was the main difference.

Tom "Beag" Gillespie was manager of the Gaoth Dobhair under-14 team at the team Ó Baoill began playing. Ó Baoill was part of a side that went undefeated from the under-16 until the under-21 levels. When he won a Donegal Minor Football Championship medal with Gaoth Dobhair in 2014, Ó Baoill brought it with him to the island of Kyushu to show it to his grandparents. Ó Baoill has attended Maynooth University, where he has studied Biomedical Science. He works in Teach Mhicí, a pub owned by the family of Gaoth Dobhair teammate Kevin Cassidy.

== Playing career ==
Ó Baoill played for the Donegal senior team in 2017.

He typically plays as Gaoth Dobhair's number 11 (with photographs existing of him in that number jersey from a young age) and his diminutive stature allows him to "get down under an O'Neill's size five" and race towards the opposite side of the field of play. He has stated that his ambition is to "prove that people under the standard height can play at the highest level".

Ó Baoill won a Donegal Senior Football Championship medal with Gaoth Dobhair in 2018, starting for his team in the final and completing the game. It gave him a full set of county championship medals at the age of just 21.

Ó Baoill then played during Gaoth Dobhair's first ever Ulster Senior Club Football Championship-winning campaign, a run which involved a quarter final defeat of Cargin (with Ó Baoill starting the game and being substituted in injury time), a semi-final defeat of eleven-time winners Crossmaglen Rangers (with Ó Baoill starting and completing the game), and culminated in the club defeating Scotstown (who had won the competition on four previous occasions), the last two of these games occurring at Healy Park in Omagh. Ó Baoill also started for Gaoth Dobhair in the Ulster final, scoring a point, vital as the sides were only separated by one point in the end, following extra time. Eamon McGee had queried before that game whether Ó Baoill would become the first Japanese man to play in the final of the Ulster Club Football Championship.

== Personal life ==
Ó Baoill moved to Canada in 2021. He originally intended to visit the city of Vancouver in British Columbia during a summer break from his studies. Then the COVID-19 pandemic happened, causing his trip to be delayed. While in Canada, he plays Gaelic for St Finnian's. Currently, Naoise is playing for a social Australian football league named the Yeah Nah Yeah's.

== Honours ==
- Ulster Senior Club Football Championship: 2018
- Donegal Senior Football Championship: 2018
- Ulster Under-21 Club Football Championship: 2018
- Donegal Under-21 Club Football Championship: 2018
- Donegal Minor Football Championship: 2014
