= Daire Ó Baoill =

Irish Gaelic footballer

Personal information
- Born: 1996/7

Sport
- Sport: Gaelic football
Club
- Years: Club
- 201?–: Gaoth Dobhair
Club titles
- Donegal titles: 1
- Ulster titles: 1
Inter-county
- Years: County
- 201?–: Donegal
- Ulster titles: 4

Daire Ó Baoill (born 1996/7) is an Irish Gaelic footballer and former association footballer who plays for Gaoth Dobhair and the Donegal county team.

Ó Baoill previously played association football with the under-19 team of League of Ireland side Finn Harps. He works in Teach Mhicí, a pub owned by the family of Gaoth Dobhair teammate Kevin Cassidy. He is a cousin of Naoise Ó Baoill, and also works as a SNA at PSGD in the gaeltacht area.

== Playing career ==
Ó Baoill played for the Finn Harps under-19 team for three years and captained the Republic of Ireland under-18 national football team. He did so to improve his football, as he explained in 2018:

I knew at the end of the day it would be GAA, that's why I played as much soccer as I could. Two years ago I remember going from one game playing from Harps, I think we beat Bohemians 3–1, and then I had to line out in championship for Gaoth Dobhair against Termon. We lost to Termon in the last group stage game. You're going from game to game and I just knew the legs wouldn't be able to do that for much longer. The manager I had at Finn Harps, Joe Boyle, he was a Gaelic man too at heart and he understood the decision at the end of the day. He'd still be getting onto me and things like that.

His decision to play for the north-western based Finn Harps under-19 team was also influenced by his studies at Maynooth University, where he was within reach of teams such as Wexford or Cork City, and would often travel south to make up the squad numbers.

=== Club ===
Ó Baoill was part of a side that went undefeated from the under-16 until the under-21 levels.

Ó Baoill won a Donegal Senior Football Championship medal with his club in 2018, scoring two points in the final.

He then played during Gaoth Dobhair's first ever Ulster Senior Club Football Championship-winning campaign later in 2018, scoring a first-half hat-trick of goals (including a penalty kick) to defeat eleven-time Ulster championship winners Crossmaglen Rangers in the semi-final at Healy Park in Omagh.

Ó Baoill then played in Gaoth Dobhair's final defeat of Scotstown (who had won the competition on four previous occasions), also at Healy Park.

=== Inter-county ===
Ó Baoill featured at minor and under-21 level for his county under the management of Declan Bonner.

With Bonner taking over the senior team following the departure of Rory Gallagher, Ó Baoill made a substitute appearance against Tyrone during Donegal's Division One campaign in the 2018 National Football League. It was his only appearance for Donegal during that league campaign.

Ó Baoill went on to make five senior championship appearances for Donegal in 2018. The first of these was a substitute appearance against Derry in the quarter-final of the 2018 Ulster Senior Football Championship — a match in which, despite being only on the field of play for little over ten minutes, he provided the pass to Cian Mulligan that led to Mulligan scoring Donegal's second goal of the game. Ó Baoill made another substitute appearance in the semi-final win over Down, likewise in the final, as Donegal secured that year's championship.

Donegal qualified for the 2019 National Football League Division 2 final and Ó Baoill started the game as Donegal defeated Meath to win the title.

Ó Baoill came on as a substitute in the final of the 2019 Ulster Senior Football Championship against Cavan, scoring one point and claiming his second Ulster senior title. He started against Fermanagh in the quarter-final and was a substitute in the semi-final win over Tyrone.

== Personal life ==
Ó Baoill was "away" for some of his club's 2023 season.

== Honours ==
Donegal

- Ulster Senior Football Championship: 2018, 2019, 2024, 2025
- National Football League Division 2: 2019

Gaoth Dobhair

- Ulster Senior Club Football Championship: 2018
- Donegal Senior Football Championship: 2018
