= Jimmy's Winnin' Matches =

- Genre: Documentary
- Directed by: Joanne McGrath
- Starring: Jim McGuinness
- Country of origin: Ireland

Production
- Producer: Joanne McGrath
- Cinematography: Emmet Harte, Brendan Bradas O'Donnell
- Editor: Michael Harte
- Running time: 1 hour

Original release
- Network: RTÉ One
- Release: 3 January 2013

Jimmy's Winnin' Matches is an hour-long documentary which followed the success of the Donegal senior football team that won the 2012 All-Ireland Senior Football Championship Final under the guidance of Jim McGuinness. It take its name from the song "Jimmy's Winning Matches", the anthem of Donegal's 2012 Championship success.

It first aired on RTÉ One on 3 January 2013 at 9:35 p.m. Coco Television were responsible for putting it together.

The documentary featured an exclusive interview with McGuinness filmed at his Glenties home, while Rory Gallagher, who penned the famous song, also featured, with Alan Foley doing the research.
