= Neil McGee =

Donegal Gaelic footballer (born 1985)

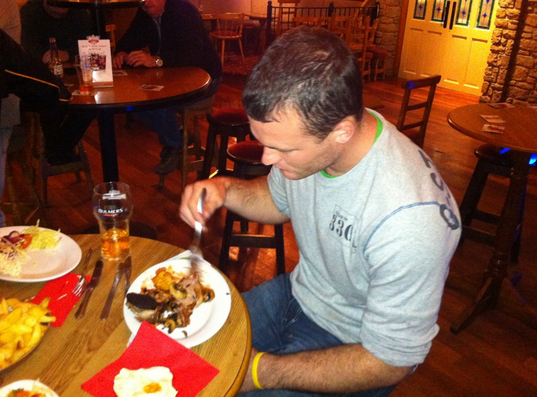

Personal information
- Native name: Niall Mac Aoidh (Irish)
- Born: 13 November 1985 (age 40) Letterkenny, Ireland
- Occupation: Roofer
- Height: 1.85 m (6 ft 1 in)

Sport
- Sport: Gaelic football
- Position: Full Back
Club
- Years: Club
- 2002–: Gaoth Dobhair
Club titles
- Donegal titles: 3
- Ulster titles: 1
Inter-county
Years	County	Apps (scores)
2005–2022	Donegal	195 (0–0)
Inter-county titles
- Ulster titles: 5
- All-Irelands: 1
- NFL: 1
- All Stars: 3

Neil McGee (born 13 November 1985) is an Irish Gaelic footballer who plays for Gaoth Dobhair and, formerly, both the Donegal county team and the Ireland international rules football team.

From Gweedore in County Donegal, he won three All Stars, one All-Ireland Senior Football Championship title, five Ulster Senior Football Championship titles and one National Football League title with his county, an Ulster Senior Club Football Championship title with his club and two International Rules Series with his country.

== Playing career ==
=== Club ===
He made his championship debut for his club against Na Piarsaigh on 23 June 2002. By 2023 he had won three Donegal Senior Football Championship (SFC) titles with his club: in 2002, 2006 and 2018; and he had played for his club in 22 consecutive championship campaigns, including in 32 consecutive championship games between 2002 and 2009. Ahead of the 2023 Donegal Senior Football Championship final, he had made 98 appearances in the club championship (93 in the Donegal SFC and 5 in the Ulster and All-Ireland Club SFC).

McGee, as noted above, won his first Donegal SFC title in 2002.

In 2006, his club returned to the Donegal SFC final. McGee played as his team won a 14th title, in one of the worst Donegal county finals ever.

McGee won the 2018 Donegal Senior Football Championship, a first for the club since 2006. He then played during Gaoth Dobhair's first ever Ulster Senior Club Football Championship-winning campaign later in 2018, defeating Crossmaglen Rangers in the Ulster semi-final at Healy Park in Omagh to qualify for the final. In the final against Scotstown, Gaoth Dobhair won.

He has often played with his brother Peter.

=== Inter-county ===
Brian McEniff gave McGee his Donegal senior debut against Fermanagh in the 2005 Dr McKenna Cup on 2 January 2005. He played in the 2006 Ulster Senior Football Championship final at Croke Park.

McGee was part of the Donegal senior team that won the county's first National Football League against Mayo in 2007. It was the first piece of silverware the county senior team had lifted since 1992.

In Jim McGuinness's first game in charge of Donegal, a drab 2011 National Football League draw with the perennially underachieving Sligo, McGee pulled a hamstring, was moved to the full-forward line and scored a goal in the latest manifestation of Sligo's notorious inability to succeed. McGee was out injured for four weeks after that game but when he returned he established himself as Donegal's first-choice full-back in the team's march towards the 2012 All-Ireland Senior Football Championship Final. Donegal won.

He scored a goal against Sligo in the 2011 National League.

In 2011, McGee won his first All Star award. He added another in 2012.

He also won his first Ulster SFC in 2011. This was followed by his second in 2012. He attended the Football Tour of New York.

In 2013, McGee made his 100th appearance for Donegal in the county's opening National Football League against Kildare at Croke Park, becoming the sixth footballer then playing for the team to reach that mark following Christy Toye, Colm McFadden, Rory Kavanagh, Karl Lacey and McGee's own brother Eamon (they were also the first set of brothers to ever reach 100 Donegal appearances).

He won his third Ulster SFC in 2014.

In 2016, he lost his appeal against the red card and a subsequent two-match ban picked up in the Ulster Championship quarter-final win over Fermanagh.

Two years later, he lost his appeal against the red card he picked up for an alleged knee up the back of an opponent in the Ulster SFC semi-final win over Down. Thus he missed Donegal's 2018 Ulster Senior Football Championship final victory over Fermanagh.

He equalled Colm McFadden's record of 173 appearances for Donegal when he came on as a second half substitute in the final round of the 2019 National Football League, a victory over Kildare. He then broke McFadden's record with his 174th appearance for his county against Meath as a substitute in the final at Croke Park, also won by Donegal.

He won his fifth Ulster SFC in 2019.

Shortly before his 37th birthday, and with a record 195 appearances for the team, McGee announced his retirement from inter-county football in an exclusive interview given to Frank Craig and published in the Donegal News on 29 September 2022.

=== Inter-provincial ===
McGee played for Ulster in the Inter-Provincial Series.

=== International rules ===
McGee thrice represented Ireland against Australia in the International Rules Series: in 2011, 2013 and 2014. Ireland won the first two and lost the third. According to Eoin Liston, who has worked with any of the Irish teams, McGee was "tailor-made" for international rules football.

== Coaching career ==
In August 2023, McGee was confirmed as being on the backroom team of Jim McGuinness, as McGuinness began his second spell as manager of the Donegal senior team.

== Honours ==
Donegal

- All-Ireland Senior Football Championship: 2012
- Ulster Senior Football Championship: 2011, 2012, 2014, 2018, 2019
- National Football League Division 1: 2007
- National Football League Division 2: 2011, 2019
- Dr McKenna Cup: 2010

Gaoth Dobhair

- Ulster Senior Club Football Championship: 2018
- Donegal Senior Football Championship: 2002, 2006, 2018

Ulster

- Railway Cup: 2012

Colleges

- Sigerson Cup: 2004

Ireland

- International Rules Series: 2011, 2013
  - Runner-up: 2014

Individual

- All Star: 2011, 2012, 2014
- Irish News Ulster All-Star: 2011, 2012
- The Sunday Game Team of the Year: 2012
