= Teach Mhicí =

Irish pub in Gaoth Dobhair, Ireland

- Type: Irish pub
- Location: Gaoth Dobhair
- Owner: Kevin Cassidy and family

Teach Mhicí is an Irish pub in Gaoth Dobhair, County Donegal.

It is currently operated by members of the family of and in-laws of the Gaoth Dobhair and Donegal Gaelic footballer Kevin Cassidy. Cassidy's father-in-law, the former Donegal footballer Willie Gallagher (who won five Donegal Senior Football Championships) and mother-in-law Kathleen, passed the pub on to their children, one of whom (Sarah) is married to Cassidy.

Locals often go to this pub to discuss the area's Gaelic football team, as well as to celebrate with the footballers when they win an important match.

Aside from the Cassidys and Gallaghers, other staff include the Donegal county footballer Daire Ó Baoill, his cousin Naoise Ó Baoill, the 2018 Ulster Senior Club Football Championship-winning team captain Niall Friel and 2006 Donegal Senior Football Championship winner Dan McBride.

Teach Mhicí also hosts GAA teams linked with a nearby residential Gaelscoil — Coláiste Chú Chulainn — run by Cassidy and his associate Hugh McGinley, and members of these teams may stay at Teach Mhicí for the weekend. There is also a wood-fired pizza shop on the premises. Highland Radio has broadcast from the venue.
