= Michael Carroll (Gaelic footballer) =

Irish Gaelic footballer

Personal information
- Native name: Micheál Ó Cearbhaill (Irish)

Sport
- Sport: Gaelic football
Clubs
- Years: Club
- 201?– 2018: Gaoth Dobhair; Donegal Boston
Club titles
- Donegal titles: 1
- Ulster titles: 1
Inter-county
- Years: County
- 2016–: Donegal

Michael Carroll is an Irish Gaelic footballer who plays for Gaoth Dobhair and the Donegal county team.

== Playing career ==
=== Club ===
Carroll's parent club is Gaoth Dobhair. He went to Boston for the summer in 2018 where, alongside county teammate Eoin McHugh, he won the Boston Senior Football Championship with Donegal Boston.

Carroll won a Donegal Senior Football Championship medal with his club Gaoth Dobhair in 2018.

He then played during Gaoth Dobhair's first ever Ulster Senior Club Football Championship-winning campaign later in 2018, a run which involved a quarter final defeat of Cargin (a game in which Carroll scored a goal and three points), a semi-final defeat of eleven-time winners Crossmaglen Rangers, and culminated in the club defeating Scotstown (who had won the competition on four previous occasions), the last two of these games occurring at Healy Park in Omagh. Carroll thought he had won the Ulster final with a point in normal time but the referee ruled it out as a "throw ball" foul by Carroll's teammate who passed him the ball; extra time was required to separate the sides.

=== Inter-county ===
Caroll won the 2014 Ulster Minor Football Championship title with Donegal, scoring a point in the final against Armagh. He then played in the 2014 All-Ireland Minor Football Championship loss to Kerry.

A goal from Carroll helped Donegal to the 2017 Ulster Under-21 Football Championship.

First featuring for his county at senior level under the management of Rory Gallagher, Carroll made a number of appearances during Donegal's Division One campaign in the 2016 National Football League: first he started the league opener against Down, then he made a substitute appearance against Cork in the second round of fixtures, started against Mayo in the third round of fixtures and, finally, made a substitute appearance against Dublin in the sixth round of fixtures.

In the 2017 National Football League Carroll scored a goal against Monaghan to help Donegal to a draw. He made his senior championship debut in the quarter-final of the 2017 Ulster Senior Football Championship. He played a part in Donegal's opening goal (scored by fellow senior championship debutant Jamie Brennan) as his county defeated Antrim to progress to the semi-final. In that semi-final, a loss to Tyrone, Carroll scored his first senior championship goal.

He was in Boston for the summer in 2018. He thus missed out on the 2018 Ulster Senior Football Championship, which Donegal won.

Carroll made himself available for his county again in 2019.

On the basis of his performances during the 2019 Donegal Senior Football Championship, Carroll returned to the Donegal senior panel ahead of the 2020 Dr McKenna Cup.

Carroll was injured for a lot of the 2023 season.

== Honours ==
Donegal

- Ulster Under-21 Football Championship: 2017
- All-Ireland Minor Football Championship runner-up: 2014
- Ulster Minor Football Championship: 2014

Gaoth Dobhair

- Ulster Senior Club Football Championship: 2018
- Donegal Senior Football Championship: 2018

Donegal Boston

- Boston Senior Football Championship: 2018
