= 2009 Dr McKenna Cup =

Tournament details
- Province: Ulster
- Year: 2009

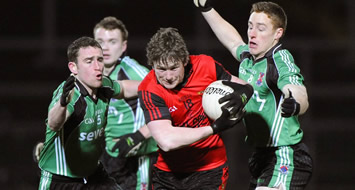
Action from the 2009 semi-final between Queen's University Belfast and Down (red)

The 2009 Dr McKenna Cup was a Gaelic football competition played under the auspices of Ulster GAA. The tournament was won by Donegal, their first McKenna title since 1991. They defeated Queen's in the final, after extra-time, with goals from David Walsh and Ryan Bradley. Donegal were captained by Rory Kavanagh. Queen's had earlier knocked out title holders Down with a six-point win. They were also the first university side to reach the final.

== Format ==
A group-based format was used, with the twelve teams divided into three groups of four. Each group included a University team, and three inter-county teams. Each team played three matches, with two points acquired for a win, one for a draw, and no points for a loss. The winner of each group, plus the best runner-up, qualified for the semi-finals, and the winners of the semi-finals played each other in the Final at Casement Park in February. format was used, with the twelve teams div

== Draw ==
The draw for the 2009 McKenna Cup was made in the Armagh City Hotel, Armagh on Wednesday 11 November 2008. The competition will start on the weekend of 3 and 4 January 2009. In addition to weekend matches, some games will be played midweek, so the competition is completed before the start of the 2009 National League in early February. Television broadcaster TG4 has pledged to screen a minimum of four live games from the competition. The winners of Group B will play the winners of Group C in the semi-finals, while the Group A winners will face the best runners-up of the three groups.

Group A	Group B	Group C
University of Ulster, Jordanstown (UUJ)	St Mary's University College	Queen's University of Belfast
Fermanagh	Tyrone	Armagh
Derry	Monaghan	Antrim
Donegal	Down	Cavan

Semi-finals

Group A winner versus Best runner-up

Group B winner versus Group C winner

== See also ==
- 2009 O'Byrne Cup
- 2009 McGrath Cup
