= Until Victory Always =

2015 autobiography by Jim McGuinness

Until Victory Always: A Memoir
- First edition
- Author: Jim McGuinness
- Language: English
- Subject: The autobiography of football manager Jim McGuinness
- Genre: Autobiography
- Publisher: Gill
- Publication date: 23 October 2015
- Publication place: Ireland
- Media type: Print (hardcover)
- Pages: 304
- ISBN: 9780717169375

Until Victory Always: A Memoir is the title of the 2015 autobiography of Gaelic football manager Jim McGuinness. It chronicles McGuinness's life, his time as a player and his time in charge of the county under-21s and, subsequently, his four-year spell in charge of the seniors.

== Content ==
McGuinness described his arrival to take charge of the under-21 team that would later contest the final of the 2010 All-Ireland Under-21 Football Championship: "I held up a photograph of the Cork U21 team that had won the All-Ireland and told the players that this is who we are going to be. James Carroll gave a laugh. He wasn't being respectful, it just sounded outlandish to him. It sounded daft to them all. And I lit up, not at James but at the mentality".

McGuinness also chronicled his four-year spell in charge of the senior team, which he led to three Ulster Senior Football Championships and the All-Ireland Senior Football Championship. One of the players whose performances greatly improved under McGuinness was Ryan Bradley: As McGuinness described it in the book: "Ryan ran the roads seven days a week. He went out running when every muscle in his body was screaming for rest. Usually he put up eight or ten kilometres in the morning so he could burn fat. And he went from fifteen and a half stone to thirteen stone six".

McGuinness cited his assistant Rory Gallagher as being to blame for Donegal's early exit from the 2013 Championship. He mentioned in particular an interview Gallagher gave to a newspaper three days before the 2013 All-Ireland Senior Football Championship quarter-final defeat to Mayo, in which Gallagher claimed Mayo and Monaghan were in "collusion" against Donegal. McGuinness wrote: "This could only serve to provoke Mayo - and they were still smarting from the previous year's All-Ireland final. He tried to tell me afterwards that the conversation had been off the record. I found that hard to believe, so I spoke to the journalist involved and he refuted the claim. I couldn't figure what Rory's thinking was". Gallagher parted ways with McGuinness following this defeat. According to Until Victory Always (published in 2015), McGuinness had not spoken to Gallagher since that game.

== Publication ==
The book's title and other details were revealed in June 2015, with a release date of 23 October also announced.

Until Victory Always was released in October 2015. McGuinness launched it in his native Glenties on 29 October 2015. Then, on the following night, gave a televised interview to The Late Late Show to promote the book.

== Reception ==
Rory Gallagher, who succeeded McGuinness as manager and was in charge of the county at the time of the book's publication, disputed McGuinness's account of the disagreement that led to Gallagher's departure as his assistant in 2013. Donegal manager Gallagher released a statement addressing the issue.

Until Victory Always won the 2015 Sports Book of the Year at the Irish Book Awards.
