= This Is Our Year =

- Author: Declan Bogue
- Language: English
- Subject: 2011 All-Ireland Senior Football Championship
- Genre: Sports
- Publisher: Ballpoint Press
- Publication place: Ireland

This Is Our Year is a 2011 book by journalist Declan Bogue.

== Content ==
An examination of the 2011 All-Ireland Senior Football Championship from the perspectives of ten Gaelic footballers from Ulster, the book achieved notoriety after Donegal footballer Kevin Cassidy was dropped from the team squad by manager Jim McGuinness over his contributions. Cassidy has not played for Donegal since. He released a statement in November 2011 saying it "appears my inter-county career is over".

At the post-match press conference following the 2012 All-Ireland Senior Football Championship Final Jim McGuinness declined to answer questions until Bogue was ejected. When Bogue was removed from the room McGuinness explained,

There was a book written. There were a lot of untruths in the book. There was a lot of things said about me. I've never broken court on it since the whole thing happened. I've held my dignity. I've let myself be castigated. And I done that because I gave somebody an agreement that I wouldn't break my court on it. There were a lot of things said in the book that were incorrect and untrue, some of it possibly lies about me personally and about some of my players. It was all-out attack for a couple of months on my character. I know what I've done, I know what I've coached, I know what I am as a person. And that's the situation. So I'm not going to let somebody sit in a room and fill their pages tomorrow on the back of what we done today when they in their wisdom degraded me as a person and some of my players.

Bogue has since responded with a public statement stating that although he holds no issue with McGuinness he would like to hear what he has taken issue with as no specific details were put forward by the Donegal man. He stands by his book and believes that he has no case to answer.
