= Irish people in Japan =

Irish expatriates in Japan

Total population
- 1,526 (in December, 2025)

Regions with significant populations
- Tokyo · Osaka

Languages
- English · Irish · Japanese

Related ethnic groups
- Irish diaspora

The community of Irish people in Japan is estimated to constitute 1,000–2,000 people.

== Notable people ==
- Shane Berkery
- Matt Heafy
- Francis Brinkley
- Eileen Lynn Kato
- Robert Cullen
- Lafcadio Hearn
- Colin Killoran
- Niall Killoran
- John Gunning
- Anna Tsuchiya
- Naoise Ó Baoill
- Sowelu
- Maura O'Halloran.

== History ==
Patrick Lafcadio Hearn (小泉 八雲) is a well-known Irishman in modern Japanese history. In addition, many foreigners of Irish descent were hired, led by Irish-born Thomas Waltles, and they have a history of contributing to the modernization of Japan. The Japan-Ireland Society is established. In recent years, Irish people from all over the country have paraded on St. Patrick's Day.

== See also ==
- Ireland–Japan relations
- Irish diaspora
