= 2018 Ulster Senior Club Football Championship =

2018 Ulster Club Senior Football Championship
Tournament details
- Province: Ulster
- Year: 2018
- Trophy: Seamus McFerran Cup
- Sponsor: Allied Irish Banks
- Date: 20 October - 2 December
- Teams: 9 (one from each of the 9 counties)
- Defending champions: Slaughtneil

Winners
- Champions: Gaoth Dobhair (1st win)
- Manager: Mervyn O'Donnell
- Captain: Niall Friel
- Qualify for: All-Ireland Club SFC

Runners-up
- Runners-up: Scotstown
- Manager: Kieran Donnelly
- Captain: Darren Hughes

Other
- Matches played: 8
- Total scored: 16-195
- Top Scorer: Shane Carey (Scotstown) (0-16)
- Website: Ulster GAA

The 2018 Ulster Senior Club Football Championship was the 51st instalment of the annual competition organised by Ulster GAA. It was one of the four provincial competitions of the 2018–19 All-Ireland Senior Club Football Championship.

Derry's Slaughtneil were the 2017 champions, but defeat in the Derry quarter-final meant they couldn't defend their title.

Donegal champions Gaoth Dobhair became Ulster champions for the first time after beating Monaghan's Scotstown in the final.

== Teams ==
The Ulster championship is contested by the winners of the nine county championships in the Irish province of Ulster. Ulster comprises the six counties of Northern Ireland, as well as Cavan, Donegal and Monaghan in the Republic of Ireland.

County	Team	Last win
Antrim	Erin's Own, Cargin	
Armagh	Crossmaglen Rangers	2015
Cavan	Castlerahan	
Derry	Eoghan Rua, Coleraine	
Donegal	Gaoth Dobhair	
Down	St Mary's, Burren	1988
Fermanagh	Derrygonnelly Harps	
Monaghan	Scotstown	1989
Tyrone	Coalisland Na Fianna	

== Bracket ==
Preliminary round
Scotstown (Monaghan)	2-17
Derrygonnelly Harps (Fermanagh)	1-11

Quarter-finals
Erins Own, Cargin (Antrim)	1-13
Gaoth Dobhair (Donegal)	3-11
Crossmaglen Rangers (Armagh)	0-12
Coalisland (Tyrone)	0-10
Castlerahan (Cavan)	0-11
Eoghan Rua (Derry)	2-11
Burren (Down)	0-10
Scotstown (Monaghan)	0-13

Semi-finals
Gaoth Dobhair (Donegal)	4-11
Crossmaglen Rangers (Armagh)	0-16
Eoghan Rua (Derry)	2-10
Scotstown (Monaghan)	1-14

Final
Gaoth Dobhair (Donegal)	0-13 (aet)
Scotstown (Monaghan)	0-12 (aet)

== Preliminary round ==
21 October 2018
14:30 GMT (UTC+0)
Preliminary round

Scotstown (Monaghan)	2-17 – 1-11	Derrygonnelly Harps (Fermanagh)
Conor McCarthy 0-5 (0-3f), Damien McArdle 1-1, Shane Carey 0-3 (0-1f), Ross McKenna 1-0, Rory Beggan 0-2 (0-2f), Kieran Hughes 0-2, Orin Heaphey 0-2, Ryan O'Toole 0-1, Jack McDevitt 0-1	Report	Conall Jones 1-2 (1-0 pen), Garvan Jones 0-4 (0-2f), Ryan Jones 0-2, Stephen McGullion 0-1, Leigh Jones 0-1, Paul Ward 0-1

St Tiernach's Park, Clones
Referee: Pádraig Hughes (Armagh)

== Quarter-finals ==
3 November 2018
19:00 GMT (UTC+0)
Quarter-final

Crossmaglen Rangers (Armagh)	0-12 – 0-10	Coalisland (Tyrone)
Rían O'Neill 0-7 (0-2f, 0-1 45), Oisín O'Neill 0-2, Stephen Morris 0-1, Johnny McKeever 0-1, Mickey McNamee 0-1	Report	Paddy McNeice 0-8 (0-8f), Stephen McNally 0-1, Bailey Leonard 0-1

Athletic Grounds, Armagh
Referee: Martin McNally (Monaghan)

4 November 2018
14:30 GMT (UTC+0)
Quarter-final

Burren (Down)	0-10 – 0-13	Scotstown (Monaghan)
Donal O'Hare 0-5 (0-5f), Cathal Foy 0-2, Ryan Treanor 0-1 (0-1f), Eamonn Toner 0-1, Sean Murdock 0-1	Report	Shane Carey 0-5 (0-2f), Rory Beggan 0-2 (0-1f), Kieran Hughes 0-2, Francis Maguire 0-2, Conor McCarthy 0-1 (0-1f), Donal Morgan 0-1

Páirc Esler, Newry
Referee: Sean Hurson (Tyrone)

4 November 2018
14:30 GMT (UTC+0)
Quarter-final

Erins Own, Cargin (Antrim)	1-13 – 3-11	Gaoth Dobhair (Donegal)
Paul McCann 1-1, Jamie Gribbin 0-3, Tomás McCann 0-2 (0-2f), Michael McCann 0-2, Martin Kane 0-1, Justin Crozier 0-1, James Laverty 0-1, Gerard McCann 0-1, Enda McGrogan 0-1	Report	Kevin Cassidy 1-3, Michael Carroll 1-3, Cian Mulligan 1-1, Eamonn Collum 0-2, Séamus Ó Baoill 0-1 (0-1f), Eamon McGee 0-1

Corrigan Park, Belfast
Referee: Paul Faloon (Down)

4 November 2018
14:30 GMT (UTC+0)
Quarter-final

Castlerahan (Cavan)	0-11 – 2-11	Eoghan Rua (Derry)
Shane McSweeney 0-3, Cian Mackey 0-2 (0-1f), Oisin O'Connell 0-2, Sean Brady 0-1, Pauric Smith 0-1, Gavin Daly 0-1	Report	Colm McGoldrick 2-1, Liam McGoldrick 0-2 (0-2f), Gavin McWilliams 0-2, Ciaran McGoldrick 0-2, Ciaran Mullan 0-1, Ruairi Mooney 0-1, Declan Mullan 0-1, Mark McTaggart 0-1

O'Raghallaigh Park, Kingscourt
Referee: Ciaran Branagan (Down)

== Semi-finals ==
18 November 2018
13:30 GMT (UTC+0)
Semi-final

Eoghan Rua (Derry)	2-10 – 1-14	Scotstown (Monaghan)
Ruairi Mooney 1-1, Ciaran Mullan 1-0, Declan Mullan 0-4, Gavin McWilliams 0-2 (0-1f), Barry Daly 0-1, Barry McGoldrick 0-1, Colm McGoldrick 0-1	Report	Conor McCarthy 1-1, Rory Beggan 0-3 (0-3f), Shane Carey 0-2 (0-2f), Damien McArdle 0-2, Kieran Hughes 0-2, Ryan O'Toole 0-1, Darren Hughes 0-1, Francis Maguire 0-1, Orin Heaphey 0-1

Healy Park, Omagh
Referee: Ciaran Branagan (Down)

18 November 2018
15:30 GMT (UTC+0)
Semi-final

Gaoth Dobhair (Donegal)	4-11 – 0-16	Crossmaglen Rangers (Armagh)
Dáire Ó Baoill 3-0 (1-0 pen), Kevin Cassidy 1-2, Odhrán Mac Niallais 0-4 (0-1f), Eamonn Collum 0-2 (0-1f), Niall Friel 0-1, Cian Mulligan 0-1, Shane Ferry 0-1	Report	Rían O'Neill 0-8 (0-5f), Oisín O'Neill 0-3 (0-1f), Tony Kernan 0-2 (0-1f), Johnny Hanratty 0-2, Kyle Carragher 0-1

Healy Park, Omagh
Referee: Joe McQuillan (Cavan)

== Final ==
2 December 2018
14:00 GMT (UTC+0)
Final

Gaoth Dobhair (Donegal)	0-13 – 0-12 (a.e.t.)	Scotstown (Monaghan)
Odhrán Mac Niallais 0-4 (0-3f), Kevin Cassidy 0-2, James Carroll 0-1 (0-1f), Cian Mulligan 0-1, Naoise Ó Baoill 0-1, Eamonn Collum 0-1, Michael Carroll 0-1, Shane Ferry 0-1, Ryan Kelly 0-1	Report	Shane Carey 0-6 (0-3f), Rory Beggan 0-2 (0-1f, 0-1 45), Damien McArdle 0-1, Darren Hughes 0-1, Kieran Hughes 0-1, Conor McCarthy 0-1

Healy Park, Omagh
Referee: Noel Mooney (Cavan)

== Championship statistics ==
=== Top scorers ===
Overall

Rank	Player	Club	Tally	Total	Matches	Average
1	Shane Carey	Scotstown	0-16	16	4	4.00
2	Rían O'Neill	Crossmaglen Rangers	0-15	15	2	7.50
3	Kevin Cassidy	Gaoth Dobhair	2-7	13	3	4.33
4	Conor McCarthy	Scotstown	1-8	11	4	2.75
5	Daire Ó Baoill	Gaoth Dobhair	3-0	9	3	3.00
5	Rory Beggan	Scotstown	0-9	9	4	2.25
7	Odhrán Mac Niallais	Gaoth Dobhair	0-8	8	3	2.67
7	Paddy McNeice	Coalisland	0-8	8	1	8.00
9	Michael Carroll	Gaoth Dobhair	1-4	7	3	2.33
9	Damien McArdle	Scotstown	1-4	7	4	1.75
9	Kieran Hughes	Scotstown	1-4	7	4	1.75

In a single game

Rank	Player	Club	Tally	Total	Opposition
1	Daire Ó Baoill	Gaoth Dobhair	3-0	9	Crossmaglen Rangers
2	Rían O'Neill	Crossmaglen Rangers	0-8	8	Gaoth Dobhair
2	Paddy McNeice	Coalisland	0-8	8	Crossmaglen Rangers
4	Colm McGoldrick	Eoghan Rua	2-1	7	Castlerahan
4	Rían O'Neill	Crossmaglen Rangers	0-7	7	Coalisland
6	Kevin Cassidy	Gaoth Dobhair	1-3	6	Erin's Own, Cargin
6	Michael Carroll	Gaoth Dobhair	1-3	6	Erin's Own, Cargin
6	Shane Carey	Scotstown	0-6	6	Gaoth Dobhair
9	Kevin Cassidy	Gaoth Dobhair	1-2	5	Crossmaglen Rangers
9	Conall Jones	Derrygonnelly Harps	1-2	6	Scotstown
9	Conor McCarthy	Scotstown	0-5	5	Derrygonnelly Harps
9	Shane Carey	Scotstown	0-5	5	Burren
9	Donal O'Hare	Burren	0-5	5	Scotstown
