= Odhrán Mac Niallais =

Donegal and Gaoth Dobhair Gaelic footballer

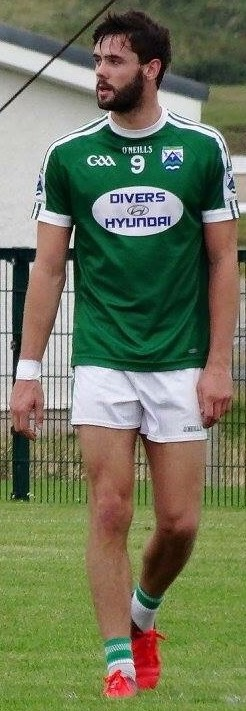
- Mac Niallais in the Gaoth Dobhair colours

Personal information
- Native name: Odhrán Mac Niallais (Irish)
- Born: 17 August 1992 (age 34) Letterkenny, County Donegal, Ireland
- Height: 1.85 m (6 ft 1 in)

Sport
- Sport: Gaelic football
- Position: Midfield/Forward
Club
- Years: Club
- 2009–: Gaoth Dobhair
Club titles
- Donegal titles: 1
- Ulster titles: 1
Inter-county
Years	County	Apps (scores)
2011–2018; 2021	Donegal	26 (4–27)
Inter-county titles
- Ulster titles: 2

Odhrán Mac Niallais (born 17 August 1992) is an Irish Gaelic footballer who plays for Gaoth Dobhair and, formerly, for the Donegal county team.

With two Ulster Senior Football Championships to his name, Mac Niallais was a prominent feature of the Donegal midfield between 2014 and 2018. He is regarded nationally as "one of the most naturally gifted footballers in Ireland".

He won an Ulster Senior Club Football Championship with Gaoth Dobhair in 2018.

== Playing career ==
=== Club ===
Mac Niallais won the 2018 Donegal Senior Football Championship, scoring eight points (including six frees) in the final to help Gaoth Dobhair to their first Donegal senior championship since 2006, and being awarded man of the match.

Mac Niallais then starred in Gaoth Dobhair's first ever Ulster Senior Club Football Championship-winning campaign later in 2018. In the Ulster semi-final defeat of Crossmaglen Rangers at Healy Park in Omagh, Mac Niallais scored four points, including one free. In the final against Scotstown, Mac Niallais was again awarded the "Laoch na hImeartha" (man of the match) after scoring four points, including three frees.

He has also played as a goalkeeper for his club.

=== Inter-county ===
Mac Niallais was first called into the Donegal senior team as an 18-year-old in the winter of 2011 by manager Jim McGuinness. He played in the 2012 Dr McKenna Cup but injuries hampered his progress that year for club and county. He returned to training ahead of the next season and played in the 2013 Dr McKenna Cup. During that competition, he scored an early goal against St Mary's in a one-point win at MacCumhaill Park. In the 2013 National Football League he made substitute appearances against Down in the second game and against Dublin in Donegal's final league game of the season, both in Ballybofey. He also played in the under-21 team that lost to Cavan in the 2013 Ulster final.

Mac Niallais arrived in 2014 having played around a half-an-hour of meaningful senior inter-county football for Donegal. That year would bring his first league start — against Laois at O'Moore Park. He palmed home a goal in the twelfth minute and scored a point later in the same match. The year also brought games in the Senior Championship for Mac Niallais for the first time. Called onto the field when Donegal were forced to make emergency reparations to the midfield following injuries to Rory Kavanagh and Neil Gallagher, Mac Niallais scored four points and collected the man of the match award in the Ulster semi-final against Antrim at Clones. He then won his first Ulster senior title, helping himself to three points in the final against Monaghan.

Under the management of Rory Gallagher, Mac Niallais scored a 52nd-minute goal against Derry from a distance of 20 metres in the opening fixture of the 2015 National Football League. He scored 1–4 against Cork in the 2016 National Football League.

Mac Niallais scored a brace in the seven-point 2016 Ulster Senior Football Championship quarter-final victory over Fermanagh. He scored another goal in the 55th minute of the semi-final against Monaghan. He later left the Donegal team. He headed stateside.

Mac Niallais returned to the Donegal team under the management of Declan Bonner in 2018. He scored 1–2 against Kerry in the opening round of the 2018 National Football League in Killarney and repeated the feat against Tyrone in Omagh during the fifth round of fixtures. He started the final and scored a point as Donegal secured the 2018 Ulster Senior Football Championship.

Following the death of a clubmate in a car accident in January 2019, Mac Niallais opted out of the Donegal panel that year. He thus missed out on the 2019 Ulster Senior Football Championship, which Donegal won. But from September 2019, Mac Niallais met regularly with county manager Bonner. By November, Mac Niallais had decided to return to the team. "At the same time", Mac Niallais later said, "it was still in the back of my mind to go away. I did say that to [Declan] and he was fine with it". In December 2019, Bonner confirmed that Mac Niallais had opted out of the Donegal panel for 2020.

In February 2020, he moved to Crouch End in England, close to Alexandra Palace, with the intention of playing football for North London Shamrocks. He had contemplated going to join friends in Sydney; however, the arrival of a then 18-month-old godson convinced him to remain closer to family. In March 2020, he spoke about the intensity of committing to inter-county football: "Your life's completely taken over by it. It's gone to extreme levels where personally, I don't know. I wasn't built for that kinda stuff. I obviously used to love it but after a few years of doing it, I nearly had enough of it. I wouldn't be a big fan of the travelling. If training was down in Magheragallon every Tuesday, Thursday, Saturday, Sunday, I'd be there every time, I'd play for Donegal no bother".

By mid-2020, due to the emergence of the COVID-19 pandemic, Mac Niallais was back with Gaoth Dobhair.

He returned to the county team for the 2021 season but decided to depart again ahead of the 2022 season.

== Personal life ==
He plays golf (reaching a handicap of 14 in early 2020) at his local club, located close to the Gaoth Dobhair GAA club's base. He has also been a regular snooker player in Letterkenny.

He is the younger brother of Ronan Mac Niallais, who managed Gaoth Dobhair to the 2023 Donegal Senior Football Championship final during his first year in charge.

== Career statistics ==
Team	Year	National League			Ulster		All-Ireland		Total	
Team	Year	Division	Apps	Score	Apps	Score	Apps	Score	Apps	Score
Donegal	2013	Division 1			—		—		—	
Donegal	2014	Division 1			3	0–7	3	1–3	6	1–10
Donegal	2015	Division 1			4	0–3	2	0–3	6	0–6
Donegal	2016	Division 1			4	3–3	2	0–1	6	3–4
Donegal	2017	Division 1			—		—		—	
Donegal	2018	Division 1			3	0–1	3	0–6	6	0–7
Donegal	2019	Division 2			—		—		—	
Donegal	2020	Division 1			—		—		—	
Donegal	2021	Division 1 North			2	0–0	—		2	0–0
Career total					16	3–14	10	1–13	26	4–27

== Honours ==
Donegal

- Ulster Senior Football Championship: 2014, 2018

Gaoth Dobhair

- Ulster Senior Club Football Championship: 2018
- Donegal Senior Football Championship: 2018

Individual

- All Star nomination: 2014
- Midfield on the AIB Club Team of the Year: April 2019
- Ulster Senior Club Football Championship Final "Laoch na hImeartha": 2018
- Donegal Senior Football Championship Final "Laoch na hImeartha": 2018
- Gradam Shéamuis Mhic Géidigh: 2018
