= List of Donegal senior Gaelic football team captains =

This article lists players who have captained the senior Donegal county football team in the Ulster Senior Football Championship and the All-Ireland Senior Football Championship. Unlike other counties the captain is not chosen from the club that has won the Donegal Senior Football Championship.

Michael Murphy captained the team from 2011 until his retirement at the age of 33 in November 2022.

Patrick McBrearty replaced Murphy as team captain. Captain for three seasons, McBrearty was forced to retire from inter-county football on medical advice in December 2025.

== List of captains ==
#	Year	Player	No. of Games as Captain	National Football League	Ulster Senior Football Championship	All-Ireland Senior Football Championship
	1929			—N/a	—N/a	—N/a
	1930			—N/a	—N/a	—N/a
	1931			—N/a	—N/a	—N/a
	1932			—N/a	—N/a	—N/a
	1933			—N/a	—N/a	—N/a
	1934			—N/a	—N/a	—N/a
	1935			—N/a	—N/a	—N/a
	1936			—N/a	—N/a	—N/a
	1937			—N/a	—N/a	—N/a
	1938			—N/a	—N/a	—N/a
	1939			—N/a	—N/a	—N/a
	1940			—N/a	—N/a	—N/a
	1941			—N/a	—N/a	—N/a
	1942			—N/a	—N/a	—N/a
	1943			—N/a	—N/a	—N/a
	1944			—N/a	—N/a	—N/a
	1945			—N/a	—N/a	—N/a
	1946			—N/a	—N/a	—N/a
	1947			—N/a	—N/a	—N/a
	1948			—N/a	—N/a	—N/a
	1949			—N/a	—N/a	—N/a
	1950			—N/a	—N/a	—N/a
	1951			—N/a	—N/a	—N/a
	1952			—N/a	—N/a	—N/a
	1953			—N/a	—N/a	—N/a
	1954			—N/a	—N/a	—N/a
	1955			—N/a	—N/a	—N/a
	1956			—N/a	—N/a	—N/a
	1957			—N/a	—N/a	—N/a
	1958			—N/a	—N/a	—N/a
	1959			—N/a	—N/a	—N/a
	1960			—N/a	—N/a	—N/a
	1961			—N/a	—N/a	—N/a
	1962			—N/a	—N/a	—N/a
	1963	Sean Ferriter		—N/a	—N/a	—N/a
	1964			—N/a	—N/a	—N/a
	1965			—N/a	—N/a	—N/a
	1966			—N/a	—N/a	—N/a
	1967			—N/a	—N/a	—N/a
	1968			—N/a	—N/a	—N/a
	1969			—N/a	—N/a	—N/a
	1970			—N/a	—N/a	—N/a
	1971			—N/a	—N/a	—N/a
	1972			—N/a	—N/a	—N/a
	1973			—N/a	—N/a	—N/a
	1974	Pauric McShea		—N/a	Win	—N/a
	1975			—N/a	—N/a	—N/a
	1976			—N/a	—N/a	—N/a
	1977			—N/a	—N/a	—N/a
	1978			—N/a	—N/a	—N/a
	1979			—N/a	—N/a	—N/a
	1980			—N/a	—N/a	—N/a
	1981			—N/a	—N/a	—N/a
	1982			—N/a	—N/a	—N/a
	1983	Michael Lafferty		—N/a	Win	—N/a
	1984			—N/a	—N/a	—N/a
	1985			—N/a	—N/a	—N/a
	1986			—N/a	—N/a	—N/a
	1987			—N/a	—N/a	—N/a
	1988			—N/a	—N/a	—N/a
	1989			—N/a	—N/a	—N/a
	1990	Anthony Molloy		—N/a	Win	—N/a
	1991			—N/a	—N/a	—N/a
	1992	Anthony Molloy		—N/a	Win	Win
	1993			—N/a	—N/a	—N/a
	1994			—N/a	—N/a	—N/a
	1995			—N/a	—N/a	—N/a
	1996	Noel Hegarty		—N/a	—N/a	—N/a
	1997			—N/a	—N/a	—N/a
	1998	John Joe Doherty		—N/a	—N/a	—N/a
	1999			—N/a	—N/a	—N/a
	2000	Damian Diver		—N/a	—N/a	—N/a
	2001			—N/a	—N/a	—N/a
	2002	Mark Crossan		—N/a	—N/a	—N/a
	2003			—N/a	—N/a	—N/a
	2004			—N/a	—N/a	—N/a
	2005	Christy Toye		—N/a	—N/a	—N/a
	2006	Christy Toye		—N/a	—N/a	—N/a
	2007	Neil Gallagher		Win	—N/a	—N/a
	2008	Kevin Cassidy		—N/a	—N/a	—N/a
	2009	Rory Kavanagh		—N/a	—N/a	—N/a
	2010	Kevin Cassidy		—N/a	—N/a	—N/a
	2011	Michael Murphy		—N/a	Win	—N/a
	2012	Michael Murphy		—N/a	Win	Win
	2013	Michael Murphy		—N/a	—N/a	—N/a
	2014	Michael Murphy		—N/a	Win	—N/a
	2015	Michael Murphy		—N/a	—N/a	—N/a
	2016	Michael Murphy		—N/a	—N/a	—N/a
	2017	Michael Murphy		—N/a	—N/a	—N/a
	2018	Michael Murphy		—N/a	Win	—N/a
	2019	Michael Murphy		—N/a	Win	—N/a
	2020	Michael Murphy		—N/a	—N/a	—N/a
	2021	Michael Murphy		—N/a	—N/a	—N/a
	2022	Michael Murphy		—N/a	—N/a	—N/a
	2023	Patrick McBrearty		—N/a	—N/a	—N/a
	2024	Patrick McBrearty		—N/a	Win	—N/a
	2025	Patrick McBrearty		—N/a	Win	—N/a
	2026					
