= 2012 All-Ireland Senior Football Championship final =

2012 All-Ireland Football Championship final
- Event: 2012 All-Ireland Senior Football Championship
Donegal	Mayo
2–11 (17)	0–13 (13)
- Date: 23 September 2012
- Venue: Croke Park, Dublin
- Man of the Match: Michael Murphy
- Referee: Maurice Deegan (Laois)
- Attendance: 82,269
- Weather: Partly Cloudy; 14 °C (57 °F)

The 2012 All-Ireland Football Championship final, the 125th event of its kind and the culmination of the 2012 All-Ireland Senior Football Championship, was played at Croke Park, Dublin, on 23 September 2012. Donegal and Mayo, widely considered "one of the most novel final pairings of all time", met to decide the destination of the Sam Maguire Cup, with Donegal ultimately emerging victorious as Mayo were yet again undone by "the curse".

Dublin were the defending champions after defeating Kerry by a single point, 1–12 to 1–11, in the 2011 All-Ireland Senior Football Championship final. Neither side made it to the 2012 decider; Mayo defeated defending champions Dublin by three points in their semi-final encounter and Donegal defeated Kerry at the quarter-final stage. After the game, Neil Lennon offered Donegal manager Jim McGuinness a professional role as a performance consultant at Celtic F.C.'s Lennoxtown training centre.

The match was screened live internationally, including in Australia, India, South Africa, Thailand, the United States, and elsewhere, while cinemas also showed the game. More than a quarter of Ireland's population watched the match live on RTÉ2 and RTÉ Online, the second highest audience in eight years. Donegal's success spawned a controversial interview with Ryan Tubridy on The Late Late Show the following week, as well as the documentary Jimmy's Winnin' Matches—its title derived from the similarly named anthem that celebrated Donegal's 2012 Championship success.

== Paths to the final ==
Donegal progressed directly to the All-Ireland SFC quarter finals after retaining the Ulster Senior Football Championship following victories against Cavan, Derry, Tyrone and Down. They defeated Kerry at this stage; it was the first championship meeting between the sides at senior level. Kerry had been defeated at this stage only once before. Donegal played Cork in the semi-finals. Cork were favourites to win both the match and the championship, but Donegal reached the final following a 0–16 – 1–11 (14 points) victory. Tyrone's Mickey Harte, a BBC analyst that day, expressed his shock: "To be honest, I could not see that coming. Donegal annihilated Cork, there is no other word for it." Martin McHugh, a member of the successful 1992 side, said it was the best ever performance by any Donegal team, including his own.

Mayo defeated Leitrim and Sligo to win the Connacht Senior Football Championship and also progress directly to the All-Ireland SFC quarter-finals. They then defeated Down to reach a semi-final against Dublin. They went into the game as underdogs, but won on a 0–19 – 0–16 scoreline. It had the highest attendance of the season prior to the final (81,364).

== History ==
Donegal had not contested the final since their victory in 1992. Mayo last reached the final in 2006, although they had not won the championship since 1951 despite contesting the final five times. The two counties had never previously met in an All-Ireland SFC final; their only previous championship meeting was a semi-final in 1992.

This was the first final between counties from the provinces of Connacht and Ulster since 1948.

== Pre-match ==
=== Player death ===
Andrew Duffy, a player on the Termon football team in Donegal, drowned in Dublin after watching Donegal defeat Cork in the All-Ireland SFC semi-final. He had only decided to stay in Dublin at the last-minute, to celebrate Donegal's victory. More than one thousand people attended his funeral, including Donegal players Michael Murphy and Mark McHugh. Members of the Termon club paid tribute to him at the place of his death ahead of the final and a moment's silence was held in his memory before the game at Croke Park. There would be further tributes after the final, particularly from the Donegal manager and players.

=== Team selection ===
Two days before the final, Donegal announced that the same team that played Cork in the semi-final would start the final. Ryan Bradley had sufficiently recovered from his shoulder injury to be included, while Karl Lacey and Neil Gallagher had also overcome concerns.

Mayo captain Andy Moran missed the final having ruptured his cruciate knee ligament in the quarter-final. Mayo made one change to their team from the semi-final — Colm Boyle replaced Chris Barrett at half-back.

=== Minors ===
Prior to the senior final, Dublin defeated Meath in the minor final, winning their first title since 1984.

== Match ==
=== Summary ===
==== First half ====
Donegal captain Michael Murphy scored a goal after 2 minutes and 25 seconds, having collected a high ball delivered by Karl Lacey. Championship Matters named it "Goal of the Championship". After 10 minutes, Patrick McBrearty's attempt at scoring a point struck the post and the ball fell to Mayo's Kevin Keane. He dropped it into the path of Colm McFadden, who took advantage of the error to score Donegal's second goal. McFadden was soon through on goal again, only for Mayo goalkeeper David Clarke to save on this occasion. Mayo scored their opening point, from a free, after 16 minutes. Colm McFadden scored 1–03 (6 points) for Donegal in the first half.

==== Second half ====
After Michael Murphy fisted a point with eight minutes remaining, only narrowly missing the Mayo goal, photographers surrounded Donegal manager Jim McGuinness and his assistant Rory Gallagher. Donegal led the entire game. As referee Maurice Deegan blew the final whistle, Karl Lacey caught the ball and threw it into the crowd. Mayo had lost their sixth consecutive All-Ireland SFC final, a run stretching back to 1989. Mark McHugh ran to embrace his father Martin, who was on the sideline as a pundit for the BBC's television coverage. Martin burst into tears. The emotional moment became one of the iconic images of the victory. From Chicago to Dubai fans of the winning team celebrated.

=== Details ===
23 September 2012
15:30 UTC+1

Donegal	2–11 – 0–13	Mayo
M Murphy (1–4, 3 frees); C McFadden (1–4, 3 frees); R Bradley (0–1); F McGlynn (0–1); N Gallagher (0–1)	Report (archive)	K McLoughlin (0–2, 1 free); C O'Connor (0–5, 5 frees); M Conroy (0–1); E Varley (0–2, 1 free); R Feeney (0–1); L Keegan (0–1); J Gibbons (0–1)

Croke Park, Dublin
Attendance: 82,269
Referee: Maurice Deegan (Laois)

Donegal	Mayo

Donegal:
1	Paul Durcan
2	Paddy McGrath
3	Neil McGee
4	Frank McGlynn
5	Eamon McGee		(yellow card) ?'
6	Karl Lacey
7	Anthony Thompson
8	Neil Gallagher
9	Rory Kavanagh
10	Mark McHugh
11	Leo McLoone	(substituted off) 57'
12	Ryan Bradley	(substituted off) 40'
13	Patrick McBrearty	(substituted off) 48'
14	Michael Murphy (c)
15	Colm McFadden
Substitutes:
19	David Walsh	(substituted on) 40'
17	Martin McElhinney	(substituted on) 48' (substituted off) 70+2'
20	Christy Toye	(substituted on) 57'
24	Dermot Brick Molloy	(substituted on) 70+2'
Manager:
Jim McGuinness

Mayo:
1	David Clarke (c)
2	Kevin Keane
3	Ger Cafferkey
4	Keith Higgins
5	Lee Keegan		(yellow card) ?'
6	Donal Vaughan		(yellow card) ?'
7	Colm Boyle
8	Barry Moran	(substituted off) 59'
9	Aidan O'Shea		(yellow card) ?'
10	Kevin McLoughlin
11	Jason Doherty	(substituted off) 49'	(yellow card) ?'
12	Alan Dillon
13	Enda Varley	(substituted off) 60'
14	Cillian O'Connor		(yellow card) ?'
15	Michael Conroy	(substituted off) 59'
Substitutes:
26	Alan Freeman	(substituted on) 49'
22	Seamus O'Shea	(substituted on) 59'
23	Jason Gibbons	(substituted on) 59'
19	Richie Feeney	(substituted on) 60'
Manager:
James Horan

Man of the Match:
Michael Murphy

Linesmen:
David Coldrick (Meath)
Eddie Kinsella (Laois)

Sideline Official
Conor Lane (Cork)

Umpires
Kevin O'Brien
Seán Langton
Alan Abbey
Richard Oxley

== Post-match ==
=== Trophy presentation ===
The trophy was presented to Donegal captain Michael Murphy by GAA president Liam O'Neill. Taoiseach Enda Kenny, a native of Mayo, and Fionnuala O'Kelly was present, as was President of Ireland Michael D. Higgins. After lifting the Sam Maguire Cup, Murphy made his speech, beginning: "We have him!". He ended with a chorus of "Jimmy's winning matches. Jimmy's winning games. Jimmy's bringing Sammy back to Donegal again". After the presentation the Donegal team and management went on a lap of honour around the Croke Park pitch.

Liam O'Neill later revealed that Murphy, as they exchanged the trophy, had offered his condolences on the sudden death of his sister the previous day. He expressed his admiration for Murphy and called him an exceptional young captain.

"Las Vegas (In the Hills of Donegal)" was blared from the Croke Park PA system.

=== Press conference ===
At the post-match press conference Jim McGuinness declined to answer questions until a reporter was ejected from the room. The reporter had been responsible for the book This Is Our Year, which resulted in Kevin Cassidy's expulsion from the Donegal panel in 2011. When the reporter was removed from the room McGuinness explained,

There was a book written. There were a lot of untruths in the book. There was a lot of things said about me. I've never broken court on it since the whole thing happened. I've held my dignity. I've let myself be castigated. And I done that because I gave somebody an agreement that I wouldn't break my court on it. There were a lot of things said in the book that were incorrect and untrue, some of it possibly lies about me personally and about some of my players. It was all-out attack for a couple of months on my character. I know what I've done, I know what I've coached, I know what I am as a person. And that's the situation. So I'm not going to let somebody sit in a room and fill their pages tomorrow on the back of what we done today when they in their wisdom degraded me as a person and some of my players.

=== Awards ===
The official GAA man of the match was unveiled on RTÉ's The Sunday Game programme on the evening of the match. The winner was picked by a three-man panel of Martin McHugh, Kevin McStay and Ciarán Whelan with the award being presented to team captain Michael Murphy at the team reception in the Burlington Hotel in Dublin. Also on the shortlist were Eamon McGee and Frank McGlynn.

Eight Donegal players were named on The Sunday Game Team of the Year—Paul Durcan, Neil McGee, Frank McGlynn, Karl Lacey, Mark McHugh, Neil Gallagher, Colm McFadden and Michael Murphy. Karl Lacey was given The Sunday Game Player of the Year Award.

Michael Murphy was named September's GAA/GPA All-Stars Player of the Month.

On 2 October 2012, twelve Donegal players were shortlisted for All Star Awards—compared to ten for Mayo, seven for Cork, six for Dublin and just one (Colm Cooper) for Kerry. Nomination for Footballer of the Year were from Donegal only—Karl Lacey, Colm McFadden and Frank McGlynn—, while Paddy McBrearty was nominated for Young Footballer of the Year, against Donal Keogan of Meath and Cillian O'Connor of Mayo.

In December 2012, Donegal were given the RTÉ Team of the Year Award.

=== Political response ===
Following Donegal's victory, the Donegal flag was raised above the Mansion House in Dublin as politicians stood by and gazed upon the scene.

A civic reception for the team by Donegal County Council was planned for November.

Scotland issued the following statement, "The Parliament congratulates County Donegal on winning the GAA All-Ireland Senior Football Championship, defeating what it considers was an impressive County Mayo team by 2–11 to 0–13 in front of a crowd of 82,000 at Croke Park in Dublin; congratulates coach Jim McGuinness and staff on ending a 20-year wait to take the Sam Maguire trophy back to the county, and notes that Jimmy is indeed "winning matches and bringing Sam back to Donegal again." A large number of curious Scottish parliamentarians signed a motion asking if they might be given the chance to catch a glimpse of the Sam Maguire Cup at the British–Irish Parliamentary Assembly in March 2013.

=== Homecoming ===
The homecoming events lasted throughout the following week, as the team embarked on a "World Tour of Donegal", that consisted of 40 different stops. The team's arrival into Donegal on 24 September 2012 was broadcast live on RTÉ Online.

The team visited sick children at Our Lady's Children's Hospital, Crumlin the morning after their victory, before heading for their homecoming at the Diamond, Donegal. In Donegal, Daniel O'Donnell and his sister Margo were among the diddly-eye entertainment on offer, former Eurovision Song Contestant Mickey Joe Harte was also there, while Rory Gallagher—formerly of The Revs—was on hand to sing Donegal's championship anthem, his own composition "Jimmy's Winning Matches". Gardaí shut down the town from the late afternoon as huge crowds flooded in from elsewhere. Four Masters, the local GAA club, organised the homecoming.

Jim McGuinness and Michael Murphy crossed the Border from Kesh into Pettigo at exactly 8 p.m. with thousands of people watching on, including children given the day off school. The Donegal team arrived into The Diamond late on a wet and miserable evening where they met with a rousing reception from as many as 20,000 people. McGuinness duetted with Daniel O'Donnell on "Destination Donegal" and star player Mark McHugh sang when he joined in on "Jimmy's Winning Matches".

On 25 September 2012, the victorious Donegal team were scheduled to visit Letterkenny, Donegal's largest town, and nearby Glenswilly, the home club of All-Ireland-winning captain Michael Murphy—however, the Glenswilly visit was postponed due to time constraints which arose due to the huge crowds eager to catch a glimpse of the team. They also did Bundoran, Ballyshannon, Mountcharles, Killybegs, Kilcar, Carrick, Ardara and Ballybofey on the same day. Originally due to arrive in Letterkenny around 8 p.m., they hadn't even reached Ardara at 9 p.m. after being overwhelmed by thousands of fans throughout the county. Such was the delay that the Donegal County Board had to dismiss rumours that the Letterkenny homecoming had been cancelled, and said it would go ahead "probably around midnight". In the end it was nearly 1 a.m. when the team arrived into Letterkenny. Mayor Dessie Larkin used his own version of the famous alcoholic slogan, saying on stage: "Carlsberg don't do All-Irelands, but McGuinness does." Rory Gallagher finished the night with a rousing rendition of "Jimmy's Winning Matches". The players looked like they were going to fall asleep after their exhausting day.

On 26 September, the "World Tour of Donegal" continued. Rory Kavanagh and Kevin Rafferty visited their former school, Scoil Colmcille, Letterkenny, accompanied by the Sam Maguire Cup, as well as Colm McFadden and Frank McGlynn. Then it was to Termon, and to the home club of goalkeeper Michael Boyle and his close friend Andrew Duffy, who drowned in Dublin after the semi-final against Cork. Andrew Duffy was remembered by those present. Also scheduled for visits on 26 September were Downings, St Michael's in Creeslough (home club of top-scorer Colm McFadden), Falcarragh, Gaoth Dobhair (home club of the McGee brothers), Naomh Mhuire in Muladuff, An Clochán Liath, Na Rossa and Glenties (home of manager Jim McGuinness).

On 27 September, the "World Tour of Donegal" concluded with stops at Carndonagh, Malin, Urris, Buncrana, and, eventually, the postponed visit to Glenswilly—the home club of All-Ireland-winning captain Michael Murphy.

=== Tubridy interview ===
On 28 September 2012, manager and team appeared on The Late Late Show, the world's longest running chat show, hosted by Ryan Tubridy. The "interview" was criticised by many—its shortness was contrasted with the full sit-down interview Tubridy conducted with Dublin the previous year—, with UTV broadcaster Adrian Logan calling it a "disgrace".

=== Post-homecoming ===
Jim McGuinness vowed that the Sam Maguire Cup would be taken to every school in the county.

Sam was at a world record attempt at O'Donnell Park on 29 September. Then there were Donegal Senior Football Championship games to attend to the next day.

The Donegal senior inter-county football team did not play again until 3 November, when they took on Ulster in the Match for Michaela.

The winning team later received their medals at a function in the Mount Errigal Hotel.

RTÉ aired the documentary Jimmy's Winnin' Matches on Thursday, 3 January 2013 at 9.35 pm, concerning Donegal's Championship success.

Mayor Cllr. Frank McBrearty Jnr and members of Donegal County Council honoured the Donegal Team and Management with a civic reception in the County House Lifford in February 2013.

TG4 showed the match in full on Easter Sunday 2020.
