= Adrian Logan =

Northern Irish TV presenter and journalist

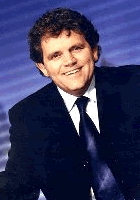
- Born: 1 August 1955 (age 70); Dungannon, County Tyrone, Northern Ireland
- Occupations: Sports presenter, television journalist

Adrian Logan (born 1 August 1955 in Dungannon) is a Northern Irish television presenter and journalist.

== Broadcasting career ==
Adrian is the son of Dungannon journalist and sportsman PJ "Packie" Logan. He joined Ulster Television in 1985 as a sports reporter and presenter, later becoming the station's sports editor. On 24 April 2009, Adrian announced he had resigned from UTV, claiming to have been poorly treated by station management.

Prior to his departure, it was claimed Logan had been offered the choice of taking a redundancy package or accepting a post as a cross-platform sports reporter on a Thursday-Sunday shift pattern.

== Personal life ==
Logan was a founder member of the Ulster GAA Writer's Association in 1988. He is married and has three children. He is also a member of the Northern Ireland Football Writers. In recent time he has worked with bbc Sport radio covering both the GAA Championship and the Irish Premiership. He has worked with several leading companies the length and breath of Ireland hosting business and sporting events featuring all the top names of local and international sport.
