= Jimmy's Winning Matches =

Song by Rory and the Island
- Recorded: 2012, Lanzarote
- Length: Variable
- Songwriter: Rory Gallagher

"I remember seeing Florence and the Machine, Noah and the Whale, The Divine Comedy. So I thought I would go with Rory and the Island".

– Rory Gallagher speaking about the moniker in 2022

"Jimmy's Winning Matches", originally called "Jimmy Selling Watches", is a song performed by Rory and the Island —and the anthem of Donegal's march towards the 2012 All-Ireland Senior Football Championship Final. Considered an Internet and YouTube sensation, "Jimmy's Winning Matches" hit number one on the iTunes chart.

With the title referring to the then Donegal team manager Jim McGuinness, the song was compared both to the legendary sports anthem "Put 'Em Under Pressure" as well as the iconic song "Give It a Lash Jack".

Morning Ireland, normally a conservative public service programme on RTÉ Radio 1 dealing with formal issues such as politics, played the song on consecutive days after Donegal won the 2012 All-Ireland Senior Football Championship Final. Numerous alternative versions have emerged on YouTube, including one by a "four-year old kid" and one from an "accordion-wielding band".

== Video ==
The song is performed on a Lanzarote beach by Rory Gallagher, formerly of The Revs, and features Jimmy who's "not from Donegal, he comes from Senegal". The pair are perched against a rock upon a Donegal flag lying on the sand with the sea in the background. When Jimmy was prevented from entering Ireland due to a visa issue the hashtag #LetSenegalJimmyIn became a top trending tag on Twitter. After Donegal secured the Sam Maguire Cup, Ireland West Airport—situated in the territory of beaten All-Ireland Final opposition Mayo—offered to fly Jimmy into Ireland for free.

== Notable performances ==
The song was sung by Karl Lacey on the Croke Park pitch at the end of a post-match interview following the semi-final win over Cork. When questioned about Donegal's prospects in the final Lacey paused, glanced into the sky and sang "Jimmy's winning matches, Jimmy's winning games…" before running off down the Croke Park tunnel.

After the 2012 All-Ireland Senior Football Championship Final victory over Mayo, Donegal's team captain Michael Murphy completing his speech by breaking into his own version of the complete chorus, "Jimmy's winning matches. Jimmy's winning games. Jimmy's bringing Sammy back to Donegal again".

Murphy sang it again in Pettigo as the team entered Donegal territory.

At the team's homecoming in The Diamond, Donegal, a visibly hyperactive Mark McHugh duetted with a delighted Rory Gallagher on stage as the rest of the team watched on.

At the Letterkenny homecoming on 25 September 2012, Rory Gallagher finished the night with a rousing rendition of "Jimmy's Winning Matches".

Following the 2012 All-Ireland Senior Hurling Championship Final, winning Kilkenny captain Eoin Larkin sang his own version of "Cody's Winning Matches", referring to manager Brian Cody.

== Notable fans ==
The song has met with the approval both of crooner Daniel O'Donnell and Irish international soccer goalkeeper Shay Given, two of Donegal's most famous international exports.

When Donegal won the All-Ireland Final, Scotland issued the following statement which quoted the song, "The Parliament congratulates County Donegal on winning the GAA All-Ireland Senior Football Championship, defeating what it considers was an impressive County Mayo team by 2–11 to 0–13 in front of a crowd of 82,000 at Croke Park in Dublin; congratulates coach Jim McGuinness and staff on ending a 20-year wait to take the Sam Maguire trophy back to the county, and notes that Jimmy is indeed "winning matches and bringing Sam back to Donegal again."

== Legacy ==
"Jimmy's Winning Matches just goes to show that in life timing is everything. If you have a single that connects with people and you have the right manager at the right gig on the right night then you are set. That's why you have so many people out there who are far more talented than those in the top ten, it's all about timing".

– Rory Gallagher speaking about the song in 2022

The title of the song was alluded to in the documentary Jimmy's Winnin Matches, first aired on RTÉ One on Thursday, 3 January 2013 at 9.35 pm, concerning Donegal's Championship success. It is also continuously referenced in headlines, whether the team win or lose.

The title of the song has been used to refer to people from other sports, including Jimmy Barry-Murphy (from hurling) and Jimmy Gopperth (New Zealander from rugby union).

"Jimmy's Winning Matches" was played at Oriel Park in May 2021 when Dundalk (whose interim manager was named Jim Magilton) ended the undefeated league run of Shamrock Rovers, which had gone on since September 2019.

Rory Gallagher, who wrote the song, credited the song and its popularity with saving his life after he suffered a nervous breakdown.

I was playing four-hour gigs to drunken tourists and I just wasn't getting anything out of it. I was broke, playing horrible cover songs, drinking cheap booze and downing uppers. I just knew it couldn't go on.

Senegal Jimmy became the victim of imposters who posed for photographs with unsuspecting tourists.

""It's so strange still as I remember all those years ago Jim McGuinness coming up to me , putting his arm around me and whispering gently into my ear: 'See that song you wrote, it has my head melted!' It got even worse for him when RTÉ then made a comedy sketch of him walking around Donnybrook and everyone running up to him shouting Jimmy's Winning Matches as he kept trying to walk away faster! But to be honest I think this genuinely stems from his modesty, he always pushes how brilliant the team are and that they do the harder work, and deserve all the credit. This is why in the 2024 revamp version I released I changed the final chorus lyrics to 'The Team are Winning Matches'".

– Rory Gallagher speaking about the song in 2025

Jimmy never did get to Ireland, at least as of 2014. Rory Gallagher said in 2022: "Lanzarote is in the past. I'll be going out for a few weddings in the summer and then another in the winter but it's been three years since I lived there".

Three years later, RTÉ invited Rory Gallagher onto Up for the Match ahead of Donegal's appearance in the 2025 All-Ireland Senior Football Championship final.

== See also ==
- The Revs
