= David Walsh (Donegal Gaelic footballer) =

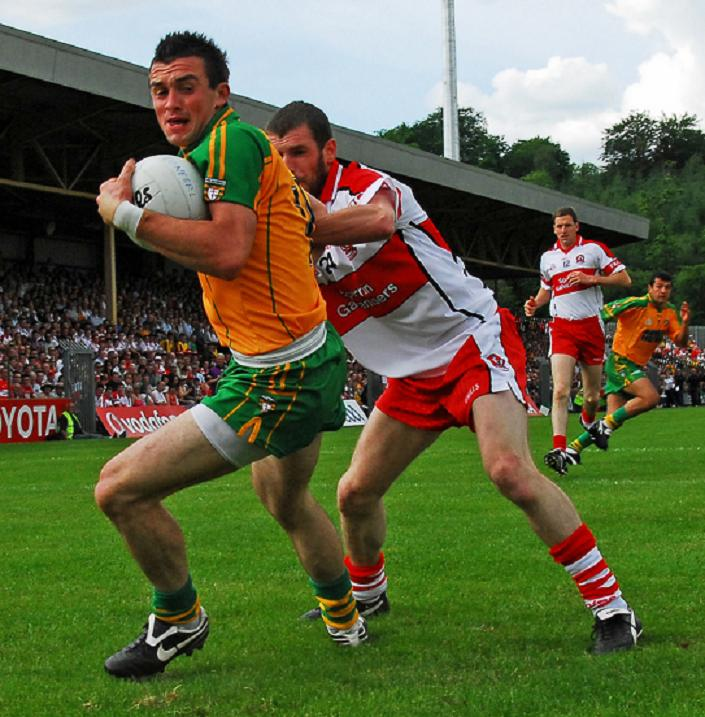

Personal information
- Native name: Daithí Breathnach (Irish)
- Born: County Donegal, Ireland

Sport
- Sport: Gaelic football
- Position: Right half forward
Club
- Years: Club
- Naomh Bríd
Inter-county
- Years: County
- 2008–2016: Donegal
Inter-county titles
- Ulster titles: 3
- All-Irelands: 1
- NFL: 0
- All Stars: 0

David Walsh is an Irish former Gaelic footballer who plays for Naomh Bríd and also, formerly, for the Donegal county team.

A member of the Donegal panel that won the 2012 All-Ireland Senior Football Championship Final against Mayo, he came on as a substitute in the second half of the game in place of Ryan Bradley.

He injured his shoulder in a club championship match in October 2012 but returned to training ahead of the 2013 Ulster Championship.

In January 2017, Walsh retired from the inter-county game.

== Honours ==
Donegal

- All-Ireland Senior Football Championship: 2012
- Ulster Senior Football Championship: 2011, 2012, 2014
