= Kevin Cassidy =

Donegal and Gaoth Dobhair Gaelic footballer

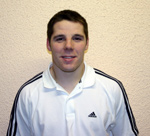

Personal information
- Nickname: Cass
- Born: 1981 (age 44–45) Glasgow, Scotland

Sport
- Sport: Gaelic football
- Position: Wing Back
Club
- Years: Club
- 1999–: Gaoth Dobhair
Club titles
- Donegal titles: 3
- Ulster titles: 1
Inter-county
- Years: County
- 2002–2011: Donegal
Inter-county titles
- Ulster titles: 1
- NFL: 1
- All Stars: 2

Kevin Cassidy (born 1981) is an Irish-Scottish Gaelic footballer, businessperson, columnist and commentator. Though born in Glasgow, Scotland, he has been living in Gaoth Dobhair, County Donegal from a young age.

Cassidy plays his club football for Gaoth Dobhair, with whom he has won three Donegal Senior Football Championships and one Ulster Senior Club Football Championship. Regarded as one of the best attacking wing half-backs of his generation, Cassidy has also played in midfield and even been his club's leading target man at the edge of the square during their successful Ulster Senior Club Football Championship campaign. A former member of the Donegal county team, Cassidy was twice an All Star — in his maiden season and in his last. He won the 2007 National Football League and the 2011 Ulster Senior Football Championship, before an enforced — and, subsequently, permanent — absence from the inter-county scene after Cassidy became involved in a dispute about a book with manager Jim McGuinness. In May 2012, the Irish Independent named him in its selection of Donegal's "greatest team" spanning the previous 50 years.

A qualified schoolteacher and fluent Gaeilgeoir, Cassidy's business ventures include the pub Teach Mhicí and Coláiste Chú Chulainn — a summer residential Gaelscoil for children of primary school age. He writes a weekly column for Gaelic Life and is often a co-commentator with both TG4 and RTÉ Sport.

== Early life ==
Cassidy's mother Ann is a native of Gweedore, while his father Tommy was from Scotland. His mother emigrated to Scotland where she met his father. Kevin, his brother Stephen and his five sisters were born in Glasgow where they lived until Cassidy was eight years of age. Then they moved to the Gaeltacht and Cassidy learned the Irish language. Stephen, his older brother, also played football for Gaoth Dobhair. Cassidy initially played association football but watching his brother playing Gaelic football inspired him to try.

Cassidy's father died in 2013.

== Playing career ==
=== Club ===
Cassidy won his first Donegal Senior Football Championship medal with Gaoth Dobhair in 2002. While in the United States in 2006, he played in the Boston Championship. He returned later in the summer to win a second Donegal Senior Football Championship with Gaoth Dobhair, beating St Eunan's in the 2006 final.

Cassidy retired from Gaelic football after Naomh Conaill defeated Gaoth Dobhair in the Donegal Senior Football Championship. However, he was persuaded to return and he went on to win a third Donegal Senior Football Championship medal with his club in 2018. He was then instrumental in Gaoth Dobhair's first ever Ulster Senior Club Football Championship success later in 2018, a run which involved a quarter final defeat of Cargin (a game in which Cassidy scored a goal and three points), a semi-final defeat of eleven-time winners Crossmaglen Rangers (a game in which Cassidy scored a goal and two points), and culminated in the club defeating Scotstown (who had won the competition on four previous occasions), the last two of these games occurring at Healy Park in Omagh. Thus, Cassidy added a provincial club title to his three county championships, and, afterwards, he described it as "the proudest moment" of his life. Cassidy earned praise both for his performance and, also, his efforts to control his fellow players and management team when tensions threatened to escalate on the pitch. Afterwards, he reflected on his expulsion from the county team by Jim McGuinness (see below) and admitted that if this had not occurred, and taking into consideration his then age of 37, he would most likely have been a spectator instead of a player on the day.

He spent two summers with Donegal Boston, the first when he was aged "23 or 24" and the second later with his family. In June 2018, he said he had spent four years in the United States.

=== Inter-county ===
Cassidy made his Championship debut against Cavan at Breffni Park on 12 May 2002. In his first season with Donegal, the team reached the 2002 Ulster Senior Football Championship final, but were defeated. Then he famously went on the lash when Donegal secured a draw against Dublin in their August Bank Holiday Monday All-Ireland quarter-final. Dublin obliterated Donegal in the replay. Nevertheless, Cassidy was awarded an All Star for his performances that year.

The following year, his commitment to the team was called into question again. He made a substitute appearance in the first game of Brian McEniff's last spell as Donegal manager, a league defeat to Galway in Tuam in February 2003. However, with Fermanagh having knocked Donegal out the Ulster Championship, the team entered the All-Ireland Qualifiers, with their first game coming against Longford on a Saturday evening in Ballybofey. Cassidy spent the day before at a wedding in Gweedore. He later recalled:

Things were not going that well and I was at that point a bit fed up with football. I ended up going on the beer that night. After that I stopped messing, cos I'll never forget it. At the time, I thought, 'ah sound, the game is at a quarter past six,' but this is a championship game we're talking about. I woke up at 12.0 (the next day) and there were a couple of missed calls on the phone. And it was just then that I thought, 'what have you done?' I rang John Gildea, he was the most senior player at the time. 'How's things, wee Kevin?' He'd obviously heard. I went up and Brian [McEniff, team manager] said, rightly so, 'you're dropped off the team.'

A Kevin Cassidyless Donegal overcame Longford, and ultimately reached the All-Ireland semi-final where they sustained a narrow loss to Armagh at Croke Park. Cassidy played in that semi-final.

In 2004, Cassidy helped Donegal to reach the Ulster Senior Football Championship Final which they lost, again to Armagh. Their Championship season ended in defeat to Fermanagh.

In 2006, he and Eamon McGee were suspended from the Donegal football panel over a breach of discipline. As a result of his suspension, Cassidy played no part in the 2006 Championship and went to Boston in the United States for the Summer. Cassidy returned to the Donegal team the following year, this time in midfield alongside Neil Gallagher, and went on to play a pivotal role in helping Donegal win the county's first ever National Football League title in 2007. It was the first piece of silverware for the county senior team since 1992.

Cassidy was named Donegal captain for the 2008 season. He savagely criticised the treatment of Brian McIver as a "disgrace", when the County Board famously forced McIver to resign. He quelled a potential players revolt in 2010.

Cassidy made his 100th appearance for Donegal in Ballyshannon against Laois in the 2010 National Football League; in the ninth minute he began a move that led to a Conall Dunne goal.

Cassidy had announced his intention to retire after Donegal's Championship exit in 2010 but new Donegal manager Jim McGuinness called him into the 2011 Dr McKenna Cup panel. Cassidy went on to help Donegal to their first provincial title in 19 years with the defeat of Derry in the 2011 Ulster Senior Football Championship Final. In the All-Ireland quarter-final against Kildare in Croke Park on 30 July 2011, he scored a long-range winning point in stoppage time at the end of extra-time, a point that sent Donegal on to an All-Ireland semi-final meeting with Dublin. Brian McEniff described it as "one of the greatest ever". This thrilling end to an "extra-time epic" is to this day regarded as "the finish to a sporting contest normally only imagined inside the heads of Hollywood scriptwriters".

==== Dispute with Jim McGuinness ====
In November 2011, manager Jim McGuinness dropped Cassidy from the Donegal team after he contributed to a book (This Is Our Year).

He appeared not to understand why this was so.

Cassidy would never play for Donegal again.

In what went down as a "surreal moment for the viewer", Mícheál Ó Domhnaill famously interviewed McGuinness following a live 2012 league game on TG4 while Cassidy, in the role of television analyst, stood beside him with his head bowed. Cassidy later said:

I am asked about that all the time. I walked away and never thought anything about it until people said it to me. I honestly didn't even feel awkward in that situation.

Cassidy later spent further time in the United States. He watched on from New York as across the Atlantic Ocean his former county teammates defeated Kerry in the All-Ireland quarter-final. He moved onwards to Boston, where he was when his former teammates defeated Cork in the semi-final. Cassidy would later recall that semi-final victory:

So I was listening to the radio and once they beat Cork I know they had it. Mayo [Donegal's final opponents] weren't going to stop them. So the actual day of the final it didn't affect me because I knew at that stage the game was won.

Ahead of the All-Ireland final defeat of Mayo, Cassidy's Gaoth Dobhair and Donegal teammate Neil McGee told the BBC that he thought about Cassidy after every game.

Cassidy described the team's homecoming, with Gaoth Dobhair's GAA pitch located just across from his house:

I was sitting eating Weetabix about half eleven at night. I could see Sarah [his wife] moving away, she was trying to pull the curtains as the cavalcade was taking the cup there. She was expecting me to be off. But if you are like that in general, then something in life is going to bring you down. If I was going around moping and crying that I didn't have an All-Ireland medal, then I wouldn't have done half the things I did after that.

He attended the Football Tour of New York in 2012, as the 2011 All Star winners were included.

Cassidy spent time in Chicago in 2013.

In 2018, Cassidy sat down for an interview with the writer of the book This Is Our Year, who told him that an acquaintance at social events often introduces him as "the man who cost Kevin Cassidy a Celtic Cross". Cassidy responded by referring to his Glasgow birth and his soccer heritage:

I really loved playing for Donegal and I was really proud to do it… [But] it wasn't a childhood dream to win Sam Maguire, if I am being honest… I was a soccer player and then the first thing that turned me was [my brother] Stephen playing for Gaoth Dobhair and they won a Ghaeltacht Championship. That was my first introduction to it and then I met [my wife] Sarah [Gallagher, whose father Willie played for Donegal]… obviously her history and family was steeped in it. I spent time listening in Teach Mhic to the older boys in the bar. My ambitions were always Gaoth Dobhair. The first time we won the Championship, I was thinking, It doesn't matter what I do now, we have done this.

The writer of the book mentioned that he had suggested to Cassidy to tell McGuinness that "some of those discussions were off the record, blame me and then you wouldn't lose your place" and asked Cassidy, "Why didn't you?" Cassidy said:

I just wouldn't do that. The way I see it, if I do something, I do it. There is no point saying you didn't mean it, or shy away from it.

Cassidy admitted he had never read This Is Our Year, though he also did not read McGuinness's autobiography or former Donegal teammate Rory Kavanagh's account of the All-Ireland win, citing a lack of interest rather than any animosity.

=== International rules ===
Cassidy represented Ireland in the International Rules Series.

== Media career ==
Cassidy files a column for the weekly publication Gaelic Life. He has worked as a co-commentator with both TG4 and RTÉ Sport.

He was the star of the first episode of Laochra Gael's 2021 season. Ahead of the broadcast, local politician Pearse Doherty wrote the following: "The night before we buried my father, Kevin Cassidy told me that he played football not for medals or trophies but for people like my father who enjoyed the game so much. Tonight he reveals in Laochra Gael that his 2011 Ulster medal, the only inter-county provincial title he'd win, went with my father to his grave".

== Management career ==
Cassidy managed Gaoth Dobhair for one year, 2014. He later described the experience as "a bloody nightmare".

In November 2020, Cassidy returned as Gaoth Dobhair manager ahead of the 2021 season (succeeding Mervyn O'Donnell), jointly with Joe Duffy, and with Maxi Curran as team trainer.

== Personal life ==
Cassidy is married to Sarah, the daughter of former Donegal footballer Willie Gallagher, who won five Donegal Senior Football Championships. They, and other members of Sarah's family, run Teach Mhicí, a pub they inherited from her parents.

A fluent Gaeilgeoir, he lives in the Gaeltacht area of Donegal. Cassidy and his wife both teach as a profession. They have three children: twin daughters Nia and Aoife and a younger son called fionn .

In 2011, Cassidy taught children with special needs at the Little Angels school in Letterkenny.

Cassidy is a fan of the Celtic soccer team, having been born and spent much of his childhood in Glasgow, Scotland. He holds a season ticket for matches at Parkhead.

While young, Cassidy's childhood Gaelic football heroes were Derry's Anthony Tohill, Seán Óg de Paor of Galway and Donegal's Anthony Molloy.

After being assaulted on 24 August 2008, Cassidy and his older brother became involved in a dispute with his attackers. A court case resulted, though the case took almost four years to come before the court. In July 2012, Cassidy was found guilty of affray and sentenced to community service, the judge noting that none of the men involved had appeared in court since that time and none had had any previous offences like it.

With an associate, Hugh McGinley, Cassidy operates Coláiste Chú Chulainn in Gaoth Dobhair. It is a summer residential Gaelscoil for children of primary school age. Cassidy and McGinley organise Irish language events in the evenings, including Céilí Mórs and water sports, as well as Gaelic football training, which Cassidy oversees.

== See also ==
- List of All Stars Awards winners (football)

Sporting positions
Preceded by Neil Gallagher	Donegal Senior Captain; 2008	Succeeded by Rory Kavanagh
Preceded by Rory Kavanagh	Donegal Senior Captain; 2010	Succeeded by Michael Murphy
