= Pádraig Hughes =

Gaelic football referee

Sport
- Sport: Gaelic football
- Position: Referee

Pádraig Hughes is a Gaelic football referee from Armagh. He is a regular member of the Gaelic Athletic Association's Championship Panels for inter-county games.

Hughes injured himself against Eamonn Doherty when he was officiating the Dublin game in Ballybofey in the 2013 National Football League and he had to be stretchered off of the field. The injury was so bad that he was ruled out of the 2013 All-Ireland Senior Football Championship, and Down's Ciarán Brannigan was brought in to replace him.

Hughes officiated the 2014 All-Ireland Senior Football Championship Final, which saw Donegal face Kerry.

He gave Kerry a second-half penalty against Cork in the 2015 Munster Senior Football Championship final. The Cork County Board put out an "unprecedented" statement 29 days later criticising his decision, but later apologised to him. Speaking on The Sunday Game at the time, Joe Brolly criticised Hughes for his decision, and, writing in the Irish Examiner, former referee John Bannon suggested it was a harsh decision.
