= Ryan Bradley (Gaelic footballer) =

Donegal Gaelic footballer (born 1985)

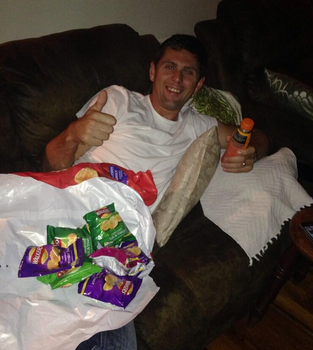
- Bradley was ordered to "bulk up" by county manager Jim McGuinness prior to the 2012 All-Ireland Senior Football Championship

Personal information
- Born: 1985 (age 40–41) County Donegal
- Occupation: Plasterer
- Height: 6 ft 2 in (188 cm)

Sport
- Sport: Gaelic football
- Position: Left Half Forward
Clubs
Years	Club	Apps (scores)
?–201? 2005 2009	Buncrana; Donegal Boston; Donegal Boston	1
Inter-county
- Years: County
- 2005–201?: Donegal
Inter-county titles
- Ulster titles: 2
- All-Irelands: 1
- NFL: 1

Ryan Bradley (born 1985) is an Irish Gaelic footballer who played for Buncrana and the Donegal county team.

Considered an underage prodigy, he was reborn after Jim McGuinness took over as manager of Donegal and became regarded as "the poster boy for the new Donegal". He emigrated to Abu Dhabi in 2013 after collecting one All-Ireland Senior Football Championship and two Ulster Senior Football Championships.

== Playing career ==
Bradley made his debut for Donegal in the National Football League in 2005 when Brian McEniff was in charge.

He transferred to Boston that summer to play for the Donegal club.

Brian McIver brought him back into the fold for the 2007 National Football League campaign when Donegal won the title. He continued his involvement with the team in 2008.

Bradley was involved in the early part of 2009 and scored a goal in the final when Donegal won the 2009 Dr McKenna Cup. However, becoming increasingly disillusioned, Bradley left again to pursue his career in Boston in 2009.

Jim McGuinness telephoned him upon his appointment as Donegal manager in 2010 — Bradley would later say, "I talked to Jim once and after that conversation he had it drummed into my head. If I hadn't have come back after that phonecall I'd have been better just to give up football". McGuinness would later write in his autobiography Until Victory Always: A Memoir: "Ryan ran the roads seven days a week. He went out running when every muscle in his body was screaming for rest. Usually he put up eight or ten kilometres in the morning so he could burn fat. And he went from fifteen and a half stone to thirteen stone six".

Bradley made his first Ulster Senior Football Championship start against Antrim in May 2011. He scored two points during the game and The Sunday Game gave him their man-of-the-match award. TV pundit Pat Spillane controversially claimed Bradley was "the best of a bad bunch". McGuinness reacted furiously, calling Spillane's comments "way over the top". In July 2011, Bradley became the first man from Buncrana to help Donegal to an Ulster title. He scored a point in the final against Derry. He won the Ulster title again the following season, scoring a point in the final for the second consecutive year, this time against Down. He later played in the 2012 All-Ireland Senior Football Championship Final as Donegal defeated Mayo. Donegal won.

Against Down in the 2013 All-Ireland Senior Football Championship he was concussed and received hospital treatment. In August 2013, he announced he was transferring to Abu Dhabi in the United Arab Emirates.

== Personal life ==
Bradley is a plasterer by trade. He is a past pupil of Crana College. He is married to Claire Sheerin, a cousin of Donegal teammate Michael Murphy. He is not fond of the media spotlight.

== Honours ==
Donegal

- All-Ireland Senior Football Championship: 2012
- Ulster Senior Football Championship: 2011, 2012
- National Football League Division 1: 2007
- National Football League Division 2: 2011
- Dr McKenna Cup: 2009
- Donegal Intermediate Football Championship: 2004

Individual

- GAA GPA Player of the Month: July 2012
