= Christy Toye =

Donegal Gaelic footballer

Personal information
- Native name: Criostóir Ó Tuathaigh (Irish)
- Born: 10 March 1983 (age 43) Letterkenny, Ireland
- Height: 1.88 m (6 ft 2 in)

Sport
- Sport: Gaelic football
- Position: Right Half Forward
Club
- Years: Club
- 2001–: St Michael's
Inter-county
Years	County	Apps (scores)
2002–2016	Donegal	65 (Championship only)
Inter-county titles
- Ulster titles: 3
- All-Irelands: 1
- NFL: 1
- All Stars: 0

Christy Toye (born 10 March 1983) is an Irish Gaelic footballer who plays for St Michael's and also, formerly, for the Donegal county team.

He captained his county in 2005, Brian McIver's first season in charge; as well as in 2006, when Donegal contested the Ulster SFC final.

Along with his fellow club mate Colm McFadden, he is considered one of the elder statesman of the Donegal senior football panel, until his retirement from inter-county football in 2017.

Among other accolades, he has one All-Ireland Senior Football Championship title (2012), three Ulster Senior Football Championship titles (2011, 2012 and 2014) and one National Football League title (2007). He captained Donegal in the 2006 Ulster SFC final at Croke Park, appeared as a substitute for Leo McLoone against Mayo in the 2012 All-Ireland SFC final and was named to start against Kerry in the 2014 All-Ireland SFC final. He made a total of 65 championship appearances, a record shared with Donegal teammate Karl Lacey.

== College ==
He captained a team to the Sigerson Cup.

== Inter-county ==
Toye's mother's name is Rosemary.

Toye and Colm McFadden were in the same class at primary school; they played in (and won) the Ted Webb under-16 tournament, the same year they were part of the county minor team.

He started the first game of Brian McEniff's last spell as Donegal manager, a league defeat to Galway in Tuam in February 2003.

Toye burst onto the national scene with goals in the Championship against Meath in 2002 and Armagh in 2003, both at Croke Park. The goal against Armagh, in the 2003 All-Ireland Senior Football Championship semi-final, was the first goal conceded by the then reigning All-Ireland SFC champions in eight championship games going back to the previous year's semi-final, and gave Donegal a half-time lead; Toye accompanied it with a point but Donegal lost the game. He played for Donegal against Armagh in the 2004 Ulster SFC final at Croke Park, but went off injured and was replaced by Rory Kavanagh. He captained Donegal in the 2006 Ulster SFC final, against the same opponent, at the same venue. He was a member of the Donegal team that won the National Football League title in 2007, playing from the start to the end in the final against Mayo.

In 2009, while in the form of his life, Toye ruptured his Achilles tendon during an All-Ireland SFC qualifier against Clare at MacCumhaill Park. He was left as a spectator when Armagh knocked Donegal from the 2010 Championship in Crossmaglen. However, Toye returned the following season, rejuvenated by the arrival of Jim McGuinness as manager. He did not feature in the NFL or Ulster SFC campaign, but was sprung from the bench in the 2011 All-Ireland SFC quarter-final against Kildare at Croke Park. Within 25 seconds of his first appearance in 25 months, he had the ball in the back of the Kildare net, later making a further vital contribution by scoring the final equalising point of a game which Donegal went on to narrowly win through a memorable point from Kevin Cassidy in extra-time. Toye had previously scored a goal for Donegal at Croke Park in the 2003 All-Ireland SFC semi-final. Indeed, with four goals, Toye is Donegal's record goalscorer at Croke Park — one goal each against Meath (2002), Armagh (2003), Cork (2006), and Kildare (2011). He also scored a goal in the 2015 All-Ireland SFC qualifier defeat of Galway at Croke Park, finishing into the corner of the net in injury-time.

He came on as a second-half substitute for Leo McLoone in the 2012 All-Ireland Senior Football Championship final, a game which was won by Donegal. He missed the entire 2013 season while battling trigeminal neuralgia but was back in 2014 in time for another shot at the All-Ireland. On 20 September 2014, he was named to start against Kerry in the following day's All-Ireland SFC final.

In January 2017, Toye retired from the inter-county game.

== Club ==
Toye's club have not had much success at senior level. They reached the final of the 2011 Donegal Senior Football Championship—their first ever senior final—but lost, though Toye scored three points.

Previously, in 2004, they reached the final of All-Ireland Intermediate Club Football Championship, in which Toye scored a point.

== Other work ==
Toye has been active in encouraging people to read more books.

== Legacy ==
The "languid" style of Michael Langan has been compared favourably to that of Toye.

== Honours ==
Donegal

- All-Ireland Senior Football Championship: 2012
- Ulster Senior Football Championship: 2011, 2012, 2014
- National Football League Division 1: 2007

St Michael's

- All-Ireland Intermediate Club Football Championship runner-up: 2004
- Ulster Intermediate Club Football Championship: 2003
- Donegal Intermediate Football Championship: 2003

Sporting positions
Preceded by ???	Donegal Senior Captain; 2005–2006	Succeeded by Neil Gallagher
