= Rory Kavanagh =

Donegal Gaelic footballer

Personal information
- Native name: Ruairí Caomhánach (Irish)
- Born: 23 August 1982 (age 44) Letterkenny, Ireland
- Occupation: Teacher
- Height: 1.87 m (6 ft 2 in)

Sport
- Sport: Gaelic football
- Position: Midfield
Clubs
- Years: Club
- 2000–2020 pre-2009 c. 2015: St Eunan's; Donegal Boston; Donegal Boston
Club titles
- Donegal titles: 6
Inter-county
Years	County	Apps (scores)
2001–2016	Donegal	100+
Inter-county titles
- Ulster titles: 3
- All-Irelands: 1
- NFL: 1
Club management
- Years: Club
- St Eunan's
- 1

Rory Kavanagh (Irish: Ruairí Ó Caomhánach; born 23 August 1982) is an Irish Gaelic football manager and former player with St Eunan's and the Donegal county team. He was manager of St Eunan's from November 2020 until the end of the 2023 championship. He currently manages Watty Grahams, Glen.

First called up to play for the senior Donegal team in 2001, Kavanagh made substitute appearances in the 2004 Ulster Senior Football Championship (SFC) final, which Donegal lost, and the 2007 National Football League final, which Donegal won. He captained his county during the 2009 season, and again on his 100th appearance for the county, in the 2012 Ulster SFC preliminary round, in the absence of regular team captain Michael Murphy. That year, Kavanagh was part of the Donegal team that retained the Ulster SFC title it had won the previous year, adding the All-Ireland Senior Football Championship as well, on this occasion. By the end of the 2014 Ulster Senior Football Championship, Kavanagh had added a third, and final Ulster SFC medal to his collection.

Alongside Colm McFadden and Christy Toye, Kavanagh would have been considered one of the experienced members of the Donegal senior football panel in his final days. His haul of Ulster Senior Football Championships was a joint county team record (alongside such past players as Anthony Molloy, Martin McHugh, Joyce McMullan and Donal Reid) for four years until Patrick McBrearty, Neil McGee, Paddy McGrath, Leo McLoone, Frank McGlynn, Michael Murphy and Anthony Thompson surpassed it in 2018. After retiring from inter-county football, Kavanagh became involved in club management.

== Early life ==
Kavanagh is from Letterkenny. His father Charlie also played Gaelic football.

Kavanagh attended Scoil Colmcille and St Eunan's College in Letterkenny. He played in the St Eunan's College team that won the McLarnon Cup for a third time in 2000, their first win since 1979.

== Playing career ==
=== Club ===
Kavanagh won six Donegal Senior Football Championship (SFC) titles while playing for the St Eunan's club. He made his senior debut in 2000, when he was 18 years of age.

Kavanagh made a substitute appearance for his club in the 2020 Donegal SFC semi-final loss to Naomh Conaill, and was substituted himself before the end.

He also played for Donegal Boston.

=== Inter-county ===
Mickey Moran first called Kavanagh into the Donegal senior panel in 2001.

Against Armagh in the 2004 Ulster Senior Football Championship (SFC) final at Croke Park, he came on as a substitute for the injured Christy Toye. Against the same opponents at the same venue he played in the 2006 Ulster final, scoring 0–1. Having spent much of the campaign on the bench, he came on as a substitute in the 2007 NFL Final against Mayo, scoring 0–1.

On 19 December 2008, he was named captain for the 2009 season.

Kavanagh went travelling abroad and only returned over Easter in 2010 but was sprung from the bench directly into the 2010 National Football League game against Armagh at O'Donnell Park shortly afterwards, having been sent off in his first game back for St Eunan's.

He made his 100th appearance for his county in the 2012 Ulster SFC preliminary round match against Cavan, and captained the team in the absence of the injured Michael Murphy.

Again against Mayo, this time under the management of Jim McGuinness, Kavanagh started at midfield in the 2012 All-Ireland Senior Football Championship final. Speaking to BBC Radio Foyle from his team hotel in Dublin the following morning, he was still hoarse himself and described the win as "surreal". He was nominated to be an All Star in 2012. He won consecutive Ulster SFC titles in 2011 and 2012. Against Derry in the 2011 Ulster SFC final, he was injured late in the first half and was replaced by Martin McElhinney.

He won his third and final Ulster SFC in 2014, appearing as a substitute for Christy Toye in the final against Monaghan.

Kavanagh decided to retire from the county set up at the end of 2014. In 2016, he unretired himself and returned to the Donegal panel. In January 2017, Kavanagh finally retired from the inter-county game. It later emerged that much of this apparent indecisiveness was influenced by Rory Gallagher (McGuinness's assistant and, later, Donegal manager), who would lay in wait at Kavanagh's house, and approach him as he returned home from school, in efforts to attract him (both Rorys also bear a passing resemblance to each other).

== Training regime ==
Until Jim McGuinness took over as team manager, Kavanagh was a frail and delicate sort of figure. McGuinness requested that he eat eight meals each day. McGuinness requested his consumption be in the form of an early breakfast, followed by lunch at 10.30, more food at 12:30, followed by more food at 3.00, more food at 6.00 and more food at 9.00. McGuinness also expected Kavanagh to eat half a tub of ice-cream if the player was not in satisfactory condition.

== Media career ==
Kavanagh has appeared as a pundit on eir Sport.

He has also appeared on The Sunday Game on RTÉ.

== Management career ==
Kavanagh managed Donegal to the 2018 Buncrana Cup.

In December 2019, Kavanagh was unveiled as manager of the Donegal Under-15 Academy Squad.

In November 2020, Kavanagh was appointed manager of the St Eunan's senior team. He led the club to a first Donegal SFC title in seven years in his first season as manager, defeating favourites Naomh Conaill in the final. Barry Meehan was announced as his successor in November 2023.

On 9 November 2024 he was unveiled as manager to 2024 All-Ireland Club Champions Watty Graham, Glen club in Maghera, County Londonderry, following the departure of Malachy O'Rourke to manage the Co. Tyrone Senior Football Team.

== Personal life ==
Kavanagh is a married man. He mentioned his wife on BBC Radio after winning the Sam Maguire Cup, explaining that the noise in the background was the sound of her snoring.

He teaches at his old primary school in Letterkenny, Scoil Colmcille.

== Honours ==
=== Player ===
Donegal

- All-Ireland Senior Football Championship: 2012
- Ulster Senior Football Championship: 2011, 2012, 2014
- National Football League: 2007
- National Football League, Division 2: 2011
- Dr McKenna Cup: 2009

St Eunan's

- Donegal Senior Football Championship: 2001, 2007, 2008, 2009, 2012, 2014

Donegal Boston

- North-East Men's Senior Football Championship: 2015

Ulster

- Railway Cup: 2012

Individual

- All Star nomination: 2012

=== Manager ===
St Eunan's

- Donegal Senior Football Championship: 2021

Sporting positions
Preceded by Kevin Cassidy	Donegal Senior Football Captain; 2009	Succeeded by Kevin Cassidy
