= Jim McGuinness =

Donegal Gaelic football manager and player

Personal information
- Native name: Séamus Mag Aonghusa (Irish)
- Born: 16 November 1972 (age 53) Glenties, County Donegal, Ireland

Sport
- Sport: Gaelic football
Club management
- Years: Club
- Naomh Conaill
- 2
Inter-county management
- Years: Team
- 2010–2014 2023–: Donegal; Donegal
Inter-county titles as manager
County	League	Province	All-Ireland
Donegal	1	4	4

Jim McGuinness
Managerial career
- Years: Team
- 2012–2015: Celtic (performance consultant)
- 2015–2017: Celtic (youth coach)
- 2017–2018: Beijing Sinobo Guoan (assistant coach)
- 2018–2019: Charlotte Independence (head coach)

Jim McGuinness
Sport
- Sport: Gaelic football
- Position: Midfield
Clubs
- Years: Club
- 1990s–2000s ?: Naomh Conaill; Donegal Boston
Club titles
- Donegal titles: 1
College(s)
- Years: College
- IT Tralee; UUJ
Inter-county
- Years: County
- 1992–2003: Donegal
Inter-county titles
- Ulster titles: 1
- All-Irelands: 1
- All Stars: 0

Jim McGuinness (born 16 November 1972) is a Gaelic football coach, and former player, who won the All-Ireland Senior Football Championship as a player with, and later manager of, the Donegal county team. Since 2023, he has been manager, for the second time, of Donegal's senior team.

Having guided Donegal to 2010 All-Ireland Under 21 Football Championship final, McGuinness was appointed manager of the senior county team later that year. In his time at the helm, he oversaw a Donegal team that won three Ulster Senior Football Championship titles in four seasons and led his team to the 2012 All-Ireland Senior Football Championship title. The 2012 final was the county's first appearance on football's ultimate stage since 1992, and only its second All-Ireland SFC title in more than 120 years of attempts. In addition, McGuinness's Donegal was the only team to defeat Dublin in a championship match during Jim Gavin's time as manager, doing so in the 2014 All-Ireland semi-final, and McGuinness's condensing of the pitch influenced how Dublin subsequently improved over the next five years. McGuinness ended his first spell as Donegal manager shortly after that defeat of Dublin.

McGuinness then became one of very few county team managers to have taken a role at a professional sports team outside Ireland. (Note: Other examples are former Derry and Armagh coach John McCloskey, who took the role of skills coach at London Wasps, and Justin McNulty, who was appointed in a similar role to McGuinness's Celtic position at Sunderland F.C. *"Cup winner Woodman moves to Wasps". BBC Sport. 9 June 2009. *Moran, Seán (9 November 2012). "McGuinness move would be huge blow to Donegal". The Irish Times. Archived from the original on 29 March 2015. "Whereas the GAA has sustained a modest loss of players to the AFL over the years this is the first time that a top-rank inter-county manager has been offered a job in professional sport. McGuinness is unusual in the ranks of All-Ireland winning managers in that he has academic qualifications in sports science and in sports psychology, in which he holds a masters[sic] degree.") He began working with the Scottish association football club Celtic as a coach in 2012, progressing to the position of assistant manager its under-20 squad. In 2017, he took up a coaching role with Chinese Super League association football club Beijing Sinobo Guoan, until January 2018. In December 2018, he was named as head coach of USL Championship association football club Charlotte Independence. Over the course of his involvement in association football coaching, McGuinness has worked with figures such as the German Roger Schmidt (formerly Bayer Leverkusen manager) and the Spaniard Félix Sarriugarte (formerly Athletic Bilbao manager).

McGuinness's unexpected return as Donegal senior manager was announced in August 2023. Having previously achieved his UEFA Pro Licence, he was the first person to be appointed as an inter-county Gaelic games manager while holding such a qualification.

== Early life ==
McGuinness spent his childhood at Ard Patrick in Glenties. His brother Charles died suddenly during the night from an unknown heart problem when he was 16. McGuinness later spoke about that event: "It was a moment in your life, Ryan [Tubridy, host of The Late Late Show], where you're going along and your life is going along in a certain direction and then, just all of a sudden, you're jilted and you're going in a different direction. In many respects it was like a sledgehammer. I have to say that. I was 12, heading for 13, and you're never the same person again. And that's being honest. All of a sudden your life just changes. You're weak and you're vulnerable. There's this sense of freefall and trying to make sense of it. All I wanted to do was make things right for my mother and father, to get it back to what it was". A friend of Charles suggested that he would have been "a cert for the county minors". McGuinness took the remark to heart and it proved an important motivation for his later life: "I remember them words and I remember staring at the television, and in that moment saying to myself: 'I'm going to do that. I'm going to do that'. And in that moment my focus became very, very concentrated and I became very aware of the fact that I didn't want anybody else in the room to realise what I was thinking. From that moment on, that's how I started living my life. When I would get in from school at twenty to four — we're just a couple of hundred metres from the school — at quarter to four I'd be running down the road or on the bike and I'd be in the pitch, particularly in the wintertime because you'd only have maybe 45 minutes of light. It just became a big, big part of my life".

Charles's namesake, a nephew of Jim, would later play for Donegal as well.

Jim McGuinness's boyhood hero was Jack O'Shea. He once wrote a letter to him asking for his jersey.

== Playing career ==
McGuinness was called up to the county minors in 1990. In early 1992, he sufficiently impressed senior county manager Brian McEniff in a trial game in Ballyshannon to earn a call-up to the squad. He first spotted McGuinness playing in the 1990 Donegal IFC final. McEniff, according to himself and speaking on Up for the Match in 2025, was actually playing that day, as the final was against his own club Réalt na Mara. He called McGuinness onto the Donegal panel. McGuinness told McEniff he was going to America. McEniff said he was not, he was going to stay and play for Donegal.

As a "scraggly-haired teen", McGuinness observed from the bench as McEniff's team defeated Derry in the final of the Ulster Senior Football Championship, before going on to win the All-Ireland Senior Football Championship.

McEniff played McGuinness against Antrim in the 1993 Ulster SFC ("blooded" him, as McEniff said on Up for the Match in 2025). However, by McEniff's account, McGuinness picked up an injury in that game and struggled to recover. McEniff left in 1994. Then, according to McEniff, McGuinness faded away for a while after that, but returned to take a place in later Donegal teams.

McGuinness was also a star of Third-Level Colleges football, winning Sigerson Cups with Tralee in 1998 and 1999 as captain, and again as captain in 2001 with the University of Ulster at Jordanstown (UUJ). At Tralee he studied health and leisure. He played club football with Naomh Conaill, winning a Donegal Senior Football Championship in 2005. With Ireland, he played in the 1998 International Rules Series.

He also played for Donegal Boston.

After Donegal lost the final of the 1998 Ulster Senior Football Championship, Jim McGuinness — aged 25 at this time — decided to go to New York for the summer. As he and his brother Mark drove towards the airport, a lorry struck their car and killed driver Mark — aged 27. McGuinness later said: "Just as the lorry was passing us it came straight across the road and took us out of it. And that was it. We were flung, really, like a matchbox up the road and spun so many times, and the car came to a shudder and a stop. Very quickly you realised that we were in a very, very difficult situation. I just told him repeatedly that I loved him. That's what I told him. It was probably 10 years before I realised or accepted that it happened".

McGuinness scored a goal against Armagh ten minutes from the end of the 2002 Ulster Senior Football Championship final. He started the first game of Brian McEniff's last spell as Donegal manager, a league defeat to Galway in Tuam in February 2003, during which he scored a point. He made a substitute appearance for Paul McGonigle in the 2003 All-Ireland Senior Football Championship semi-final against Armagh. He played with Donegal until 2003. Upon retiring he became a fitness coach and lectured as a sports psychologist in the North West Regional College, Limavady.

== Management career in Gaelic football ==
At the age of 18 McGuinness was coaching underage teams. Columba McDyer, at the time the only Donegal man with an All-Ireland SFC medal, approached him one night. He said: "I think you are going to be a coach. I want you to have this whistle", and presented him with a blue and white whistle. As of 2012, McGuinness was still using that whistle.

=== Naomh Conaill ===
The story goes that one day McGuinness tore his cruciate ligaments, broke a leg and smashed a kneecap in a game against Killybegs, leading to months spent languishing at home in self-pity and lethargy. Naomh Conaill manager Hughie Molloy asked him to coach the senior team—McGuinness accepted and in 2005 Naomh Conaill reached their first county final in 40 years. 6/1 outsiders ahead of the match, Naomh Conaill defeated a heavily fancied St Eunan's after a replay to take their first ever Donegal Senior Football Championship. The style used was reminiscent of what would later become The System.

In 2009, Naomh Conaill met St Eunan's in the County Championship Final again. McGuinness, now aged 36, was joint-manager (with Cathal Corey) of Naomh Conaill. Naomh Conaill lost that one, but won the County Championship Final again the following year. McGuinness was joint-manager with Corey again in 2010.

=== Donegal ===
McGuinness was turned down several times by the Donegal County Board, on one occasion being thwarted by the lack of a plug socket for the projector needed for his PowerPoint display. "I was the only candidate [on the last occasion] and I struggled to get it", he said the week before Donegal took on Mayo in the 2012 All-Ireland Senior Football Championship final. He had offers from other counties but held out, determined to become senior boss even when those at the top did their utmost to deprive him of the opportunity.

McGuinness was interviewed for the role of Donegal senior manager in 2007 following Brian McIver's resignation, though McIver was reappointed after reapplying when he decided to carry on. One year later when the role became available again, McGuinness was still the youngest candidate.

==== Under-21s ====
"It's the time, the thought and research he puts into it. Then, you play the percentages. Jim has a really good knowledge of all sports and knows what makes people tick. He's a lot of experience from working with different teams."

— Peter McGinley—McGuinness's number two when in charge of the Donegal under-21 team.

The last time he was rejected as senior manager McGuinness was given the under-21 team to manage as a consolation. Brian McEniff, who had remained close to McGuinness since McGuinness was 19 years of age, recommended him after the County Chairman asked him to appoint the next under-21 manager.

McGuinness guided his county to the 2010 All-Ireland Under-21 Football Championship final, in which they were narrowly defeated by Dublin.

==== Seniors ====
===== Appointment =====
In July 2010, McGuinness, having led Donegal to the 2010 All-Ireland U-21 Football Championship final, was appointed as manager of the senior team when his colleague John Joe Doherty resigned in the wake of a disastrous season. His first meeting with the downcast and "demoralised" senior panel occurred at Downings Bay Hotel on 6 November 2010. He outlined his intentions: to be in the 2014 All-Ireland Senior Football Championship final after four years of hard labour akin to an Olympiad. McGuinness drafted Kevin Cassidy into his first McKenna Cup panel, despite Cassidy announcing his intention to retire the previous season's disappointing campaign.

===== First year =====
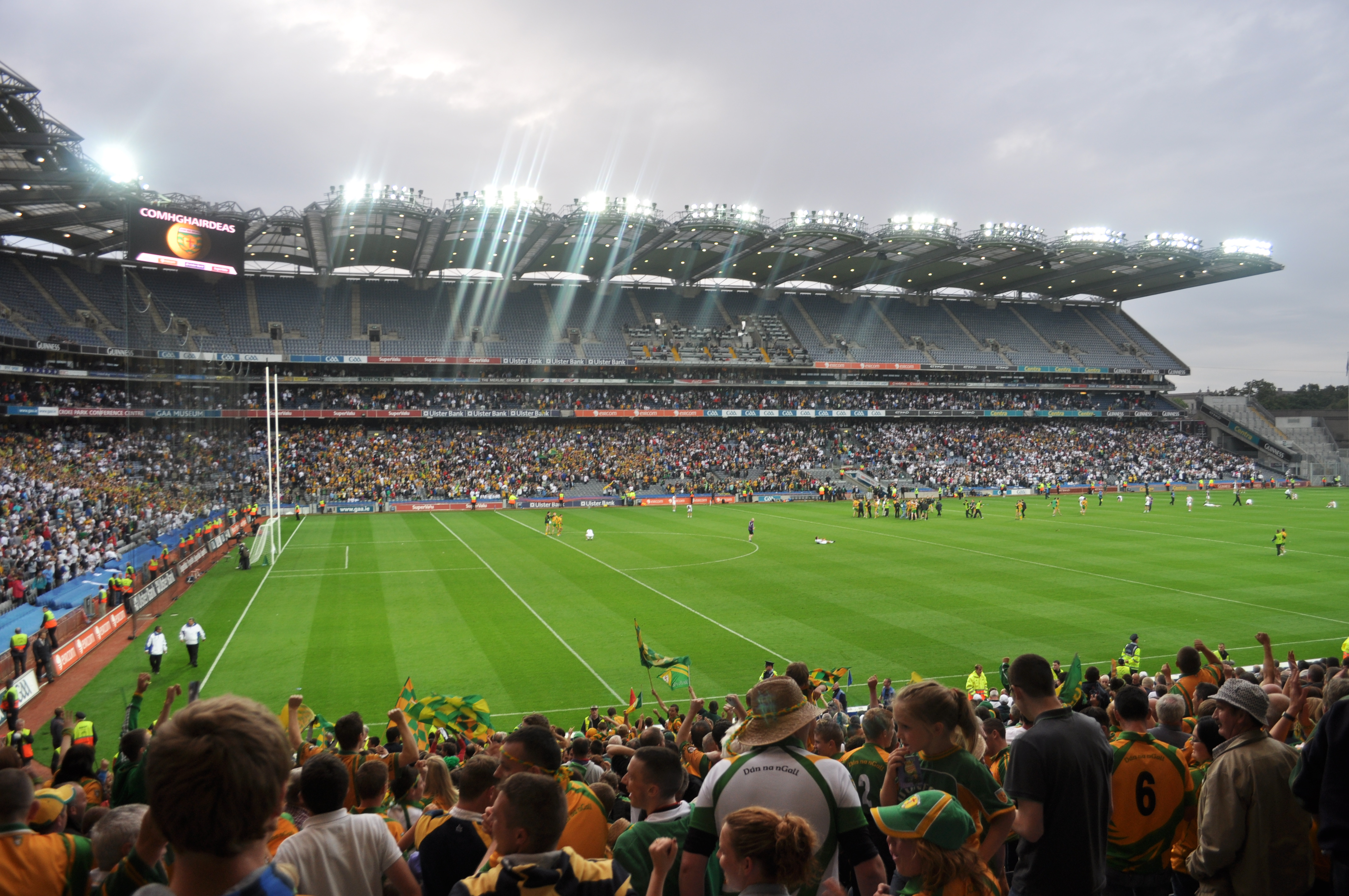
Donegal defeated Kildare in the 2011 All-Ireland Senior Football Championship in Jim McGuinness's first season in charge.

McGuinness's first year as manager proved successful, as Donegal gained promotion to Division 1 after defeating Laois by a scoreline of 2–11 to 0–16. Donegal's 2011 All-Ireland SFC campaign began on 15 May 2011, against Antrim. Both sides performed poorly; however, Donegal ultimately triumphed, earning a first win in an Ulster SFC game for four years. On his first start in the Ulster SFC, Ryan Bradley scored two points, and The Sunday Game gave him their man-of-the-match award. However, TV pundit Pat Spillane also claimed Bradley was "the best of a bad bunch" and didn't deserve the award at all, causing McGuinness to react furiously. McGuinness called Spillane's comments "way over the top".

On 17 July 2011, Donegal won their first Ulster title since 1992 when they defeated Derry by a scoreline of 1–11 to 0–8. On 30 July 2011, Donegal faced Kildare in the All-Ireland SFC quarter-final. The sides finished level at full-time, forcing the game into extra-time. Donegal edged out Kildare by a scoreline of 1–12 to 0–14, with late points scored by captain Michael Murphy and two veterans, Christy Toye and Kevin Cassidy. Donegal were then narrowly defeated by Dublin in the semi-final on 28 August 2011; Dublin went on to become All-Ireland champions by defeating Kerry in the final.

On 10 November 2011, McGuinness dropped Kevin Cassidy from the Donegal panel after Cassidy contributed to a book (This Is Our Year). Cassidy appeared not to understand why this was so. He never played for Donegal again. In what went down as a "surreal moment for the viewer", Mícheál Ó Domhnaill famously interviewed McGuinness following a live 2012 league game on TG4 while Cassidy, in the role of television analyst, stood beside him with his head bowed.

===== Second year =====
In his second season in charge of the Donegal senior football team, McGuinness led his team from the preliminary round of the Ulster SFC all the way to the Sam Maguire Cup, two years ahead of schedule, half-way through his intended Olympiad.

Donegal retained the Ulster SFC title for the first time in team history on 22 July 2012, with a 2–18 to 0–13 victory over Down. McGuinness then masterminded a comprehensive defeat of Kerry in the All-Ireland SFC quarter-final between the teams. This result was described by the national media as "the most seismic result in [Kerry] since the 1987 Munster final replay defeat to Cork". Pat Spillane, prominent critic of the team, was nowhere to be seen after this defeat of his own team, though he bumped into Jim McGuinness on the steps of a hotel the following week as McGuinness was being photographed receiving an award.

McGuinness then led his team to the 2012 All-Ireland SFC final, with a comprehensive semi-final defeat of title-favourites Cork at Croke Park. Ahead of the match, Cork were favourites to win the title itself (even though this was only the semi-final). Tyrone's Mickey Harte, attempting to analyse the game for the BBC, expressed his shock: "To be honest, I could not see that coming. Donegal annihilated Cork, there is no other word for it". Martin McHugh, a member of the successful 1992 side, said it was the best ever performance by any Donegal team, including his own.

McGuinness's Donegal team defeated Mayo in the 2012 All-Ireland SFC final. McGuinness duetted with Daniel O'Donnell on "Destination Donegal" at the homecoming. He was later awarded Donegal Person of the Year.

===== Third year =====
Donegal's defence of their All-Ireland SFC title began against Tyrone on 26 May 2013. The match was billed in advance as the toughest contest Donegal would face in Ulster, with the winner thought likely to become Ulster champions. Donegal brushed aside Tyrone with relative ease. McGuinness said afterwards: "In the last two years the exact same thing was said. The only difference this year was that we were relegated [from the league]. There was a lot of talk about putting all the eggs into one basket, but it was the same last year and the same the year before. That's what we do — it's championship football. It will be no different next year. It was a media spin that got the whole debate going. Next year we will put all our eggs in that basket again".

Donegal lost their Ulster SFC title to Monaghan in the Ulster SFC final on a scoreline of 0–13 points to 0–7 in favour of the Farney men. Plagued by injuries, they limped past Laois in the qualifiers to face Mayo in the 2013 All-Ireland SFC quarter-final, a rematch of the previous year's All-Ireland SFC final. Mayo were sixteen-point winners on a scoreline of 4–17 to 1–10. In a post-match interview, McGuinness cited the second half of Mayo as one of the toughest watches of his managerial career. In September 2013, McGuinness confirmed he would be staying on for the 2014 season, but that Rory Gallagher, Maxi Curran and Francie Friel had stepped down from his backroom team. On 25 September 2013, Damian Diver, John Duffy and Paul McGonigle were named as the new members of McGuinness's backroom team.

===== Fourth year =====
In his fourth season in charge of the Donegal senior football team, McGuinness led his team to the 2014 Ulster SFC title, then past Armagh in the 2014 All-Ireland SFC quarter-final, past Dublin in the All-Ireland SFC semi-final and onwards to Kerry in the 2014 All-Ireland Senior Football Championship final, succeeding in his original aim, set back in 2010. The semi-final victory over Dublin was particularly celebrated. Dublin had been expected to "massacre" Donegal; bookmakers were stunned by the outcome. Martin McHugh said afterwards that McGuinness was "the best manager Donegal have ever had, and one of the best in any county in the modern era", while Ireland manager Paul Earley hailed the victory as McGuinness's greatest coaching achievement. Donegal lost to Kerry in the final, by the scoreline 2:08 to 0:11. On 4 October 2014, McGuinness terminated his first tenure as Donegal manager. He had managed Donegal through 54 league and championship matches. He won 83.33 per cent of his SFC matches during his first spell as Donegal manager (20 wins from 24 games); this included defeats, over a four-year period, of Armagh, Cavan, Cork, Derry, Dublin, Down, Kildare, Kerry, Mayo, Monaghan and Tyrone.

Soon afterwards, McGuinness gave his first interview since departing, on RTÉ television programme The Saturday Night Show.

=== Galway footballers ===
In October 2020, McGuinness was seen taking charge of a training session for the Galway football team. He later stated it was a once off session that happened as a result of being asked by Galway manager Pádraic Joyce.

=== Later work with Naomh Conaill ===
He assisted his club Naomh Conaill with their defensive system during the 2022 Donegal Senior Football Championship, working with the team between the semi-final and final.

=== Donegal: The Second Coming ===
"He is a leader of men who barks orders on the sideline with no problem telling his players what he thinks of their efforts on the pitch at different stages, if needed, but greets them like a proud father once the final whistle is blown. They embrace him like a lifelong friend that they would do anything for."

— Michael Verney—Irish Independent in 2025

In August 2023, it began to be widely reported that McGuinness would be returning as Donegal manager following the team's disastrous 2023 season. On 20 August, Donegal GAA brought forward its monthly county board meeting to the following evening, where the only thing on the agenda was about appointing the new manager. Finally, on the evening of Monday the 21st of August, the return of McGuinness was confirmed in sensational fashion at that meeting, year one of three (with an option of a fourth) beginning pronto. It was big news the length and breadth of the sport throughout the island, with James Horan's return to the Mayo fold that same evening having to settle for second place as Horan slipped in quietly amid all the fuss over McGuinness.

The appointment made McGuinness the first holder of a UEFA Pro Licence to manage an inter-county team.

==== Fifth year ====
For the 2024 season, McGuinness led Donegal to the National Football League Division 2 title (and, with that, promotion to Division 1), the Ulster SFC title and the All-Ireland SFC semi-final, an exact replica of his first year (even with the exact same two-point defeat at the All-Ireland SFC semi-final stage). He did this without his All-Ireland SFC-winning captain Michael Murphy, who had decided to retire from inter-county football after the 2022 season.

==== Sixth year ====
In the 2025 season, Michael Murphy returned from his self-imposed exile and McGuinness led Donegal to another All-Ireland Senior Football Championship final but were beaten by 10 points by Kerry.

== Media career ==
In 2014, Sky Sports secured a three-year deal to broadcast live matches from the All-Ireland Senior Football and Hurling Championships. McGuinness spent three years as a pundit for Sky before departing in 2017. He returned as an analyst for Sky in 2020.

== Book ==
McGuinness's autobiography Until Victory Always: A Memoir was released in October 2015, and he gave a televised interview to The Late Late Show.

== Depictions ==
"The reason why Donegal people love Jim McGuinness is because he is absolutely obsessed with Donegal, the county, not just the football team. The lift was on a different scale when he was coming back. He's a messiah in Donegal… our most loved person ever, in anything."

— Paddy McGill—Ocean FM presenter in 2025

McGuinness's image has been represented on a mural outside Glenties, and a statue bearing the epigraph "Jim the Redeemer" was erected at Laghy close to Lough Derg. Since his Second Coming, McGuinness has even been depicted as "God himself", emerging from clouds, in swirling robes, with arms outstretched, the sun to his left and a cross to his right. As The Irish Times stated in 2025: "If McEniff is the godfather, then McGuinness is the messiah".

== Soccer coaching career ==
After McGuinness led Donegal to the All-Ireland SFC title, the father of Paul McGinley (an acquaintance of McGuinness) asked him to talk to the Irish golfer about coaching so that he could captain Team Europe in the Ryder Cup. McGinley later captained Europe in the 2014 Ryder Cup.

=== UEFA coaching licences ===
With no history of playing professional association football (and therefore ineligible for entry at the UEFA B Licence level), McGuinness began his involvement in coaching the sport by participating in a Kick Start (coaching) course before advancing up the scale over a decade to a decade and half. In May 2015, McGuinness said he would begin his UEFA B Licence coaching badge. He had received it by January 2017. He began his UEFA A Licence in July 2017. He later received it. McGuinness successfully applied to the Football Association of Ireland (FAI) to study for a UEFA Pro Licence in 2019, his classmates including Damien Duff and Robbie Keane. By 2020, he still had not obtained the licence, as two blocks coincided with games in which he was manager but expressed his intention to complete it later in the year (subject to the COVID-19 pandemic restrictions). As of 2023, and upon his appointment again as Donegal senior manager, McGuinness had completed his UEFA Pro Licence.

=== Limavady and Derry City ===
McGuinness did work with an association football team in Limavady. This was in 2005, at North West Regional College, where he was a lecturer for several years (teaching sports psychology).

When Stephen Kenny left Derry City, McGuinness was appointed the team's trainer, only for Kenny to return from Scotland and McGuinness to depart.

=== Celtic ===
The golfer Paul McGinley mentioned McGuinness to Dermot Desmond after speaking with the Donegal manager. Desmond invited McGuinness to several UEFA Champions League games played by the Scottish association football club Celtic, in Glasgow. On one such occasion, the soccer club's chief executive Peter Lawwell inquired if McGuinness would like to join.

On 9 November 2012, Celtic confirmed their intention to appoint McGuinness as a performance consultant on a part-time basis. It was expected that he would remain as the Donegal manager, spending three days each week in Scotland focusing on the soccer club's academy structure at their Lennoxtown training centre. His role at Celtic did not affect his attendance at Donegal training sessions; he attended every one.

After a stint as performance consultant, he later took over as youth coach. By 2017, he was assistant manager of the club's under-20 team.

=== Beijing Guoan ===
In June 2017, McGuinness was named as assistant coach of Chinese Super League side Beijing Sinobo Guoan, under coach Roger Schmidt. He resigned for "personal, family reasons" just over six months later in January 2018.

=== Charlotte Independence ===
In December 2018, McGuinness was named as the new head coach of Charlotte Independence in the USL Championship, where he signed a three-year contract. He was unveiled at a press conference in Montrose, South Dublin. He said that if the chance to join Celtic had not emerged, he "would be as happy as Larry still managing Donegal".

On 17 January 2019, McGuinness appointed former Athletic Bilbao manager Félix Sarriugarte as his assistant coach. McGuinness also secured the loan signings of defender Andrew Gutman and Scotland national team midfielder Mark Hill, in February and March 2019 respectively. However, on 12 June 2019, McGuinness was sacked as head coach after just one win in 14 games in the 2019 USL Championship season. Independence President and Managing Partner Jim McPhilliamy thanked McGuinness for improving the club "in many ways, including bringing talent to our roster and instituting new training methodologies", and blamed the club's hierarchy, saying they wanted to keep some of his training methods in the future.

=== Approach from Dundalk ===
In May 2020, Jim Magilton, the sporting director of League of Ireland Premier Division club Dundalk, said he had spoken to McGuinness about the club's managerial vacancy. Dundalk offered McGuinness a temporary position as a coach, but McGuinness was not interested.

== Personal life ==
McGuinness's wife Yvonne is a sister of Colm McFadden. They have six children: Toni-Marie, Mark Anthony, Jim Jnr, Bonnie, Aoibhe, and a boy, born in 2016.

The family moved to the United States when McGuinness took up the job as manager of Charlotte Independence in 2018, and were still living there as of 2020.

== Honours ==
=== Player ===
- All-Ireland Senior Football Championship: 1992
- Ulster Senior Football Championship: 1992
- International Rules Series: 1998
- Sigerson Cup: 1998, 1999 (c), 2001 (c)
- Donegal Senior Football Championship: 2005

=== Manager ===
- All-Ireland Senior Football Championship: 2012
- Ulster Senior Football Championship: 2011, 2012, 2014, 2024, 2025
- Donegal Senior Football Championship: 2005, 2010
- Donegal Person of the Year: 2012
- Donegal News Sports Personality of the Month: July 2012

== See also ==
- List of All-Ireland Senior Football Championship winning managers
- "Jimmy's Winning Matches"

== Notes ==
Awards and achievements
Preceded by Pat Gilroy (Dublin)	All-Ireland SFC winning manager 2012	Succeeded by Jim Gavin (Dublin)

Sporting positions
Preceded by ?	Donegal Under-21 Football Manager ?-2010	Succeeded by Maxi Curran
Preceded by John Joe Doherty	Donegal Senior Football Manager; 2010–2014	Succeeded by Rory Gallagher
Preceded by Paddy Carr	Donegal Senior Football Manager; 2023–	Succeeded by Incumbent
