= 2018 Donegal Senior Football Championship =

Donegal S.F.C.
- Season: 2018
- Champions: Gaoth Dobhair (15th title)
- Relegated: Burt
- All Ireland SCFC: Gaoth Dobhair
- Winning captain: Niall Friel
- Man of the Match: Odhrán Mac Niallais
- Winning manager: Mervyn O'Donnell
- Ulster SCFC: Gaoth Dobhair
- Matches: ??

The 2018 Donegal Senior Football Championship was the 96th official edition of Donegal GAA's premier Gaelic football tournament for senior graded clubs in County Donegal. Sixteen teams competed, with the winner representing Donegal in the Ulster Senior Club Football Championship. The championship began with four groups of four, and continued with a knock-out format. The draws were made on 24 March 2018.

The defending champion was Cill Chartha, which defeated Naomh Conaill by a scoreline of 0–7 to 0–4 in the 2017 final. However, the club had to play the competition without two of its county stars, Patrick McBrearty and Ryan McHugh. On 26 September 2018, it was announced that McHugh had accepted medical advice and would be sidelined for the remainder of the year due to concussion. His injury came while playing for his club in a challenge match against Dublin champions St Vincents in Cavan in late August 2018 — he received a blow to the head during that match. Concussion had also caused McHugh to spend six weeks on the sideline following a 2018 National Football League game (against Kildare or Tyrone depending on which report you read) earlier that year. The injury meant he could take no part in the 2018 Donegal SFC (of which his club was defending champion), news which was worsened when taken in the context of the earlier loss of McHugh's club and county teammate McBrearty to a cruciate ligament injury.

This was the year Oisín Gallen made his senior club championship debut.

This was Milford's return to the senior grade following relegation in the mid-1990s, after claiming the 2017 Donegal I.F.C. title.

On 21 October 2018, Gaoth Dobhair claimed its 15th S.F.C. title by defeating Naomh Conaill by a scoreline of 0–17 to 1–7 at MacCumhaill Park.

Burt was relegated back to the 2019 I.F.C. after just two seasons in the top-flight, when losing its relegation final to newly promoted Milford.

== Team changes ==
The following teams changed division since the 2017 championship season.

=== To S.F.C. ===
Promoted from 2017 Donegal I.F.C.

- Milford - (I.F.C. Champions)

=== From S.F.C. ===
Relegated to 2018 Donegal I.F.C.

- Naomh Muire

== Format ==
The 2018 championship took the same format as previous championships, in which there were four groups of four clubs, with the top two clubs qualifying for the quarter-finals. The club finishing bottom in each group contested relegation play-offs to determine which team would be relegated to the 2019 Donegal Intermediate Football Championship.

== Group stage ==
All 16 clubs entered the competition at this stage. The top two clubs in each group advanced to the quarter-finals, while the club that finished bottom in each group entered a relegation play-off. This year, all clubs played one home match, one away match and one match at a neutral venue.

=== Group A ===
Team	Pld	W	L	D	PF	PA	PD	Pts
Réalt na Mara	3	2	1	0	49	41	+8	4
Glenswilly	3	2	1	0	43	37	+6	4
Ard an Rátha	3	2	1	0	42	39	+3	4
Burt	3	0	3	0	24	41	-9	0

Round 1

9/9/2018	Ardara	2-6 - 0-10	Glenswilly	Ard an Rátha; Referee: ??? Man of the Match: ???

9/9/2018	Réalt na Mara	1-11 - 0-5	Burt	Bundoran; Referee: ??? Man of the Match: ???

Round 2

16/9/2018	Burt	0-11 - 1-12	Ard an Rátha	Burt; Referee: ??? Man of the Match: ???

16/9/2018	Glenswilly	2-15 - 2-11	Réalt na Mara	Glenswilly; Referee: ??? Man of the Match: ???

Round 3

23/9/2018	Glenswilly	1-9 - 1-5	Burt	Glenswilly; Referee: ??? Man of the Match: ???

23/9/2018	Ard an Rátha	4-3 - 2-12	Réalt na Mara	Ard an Rátha; Referee: ??? Man of the Match: ???

=== Group B ===
Team	Pld	W	L	D	PF	PA	PD	Pts
Gaoth Dobhair	3	3	0	0	32	20	+12	6
Naomh Conaill	3	2	1	0	46	27	+19	4
St Eunan's	3	1	2	0	32	26	+6	2
An Clochán Liath	3	0	3	0	20	47	-27	0

Round 1

8/9/2018	Naomh Conaill	4-16 - 0-6	An Clochán Liath	Glenties; Referee: ??? Man of the Match: ???

9/9/2018	St Eunan's	1-6 - 0-10	Gaoth Dobhair	O'Donnell Park; Referee: ??? Man of the Match: ???

Round 2

15/9/2018	An Clochán Liath	0-4 - 1-11	St Eunan's	An Clochán Liath; Referee: ??? Man of the Match: ???

16/9/2018	Gaoth Dobhair	0-12 - 0-6	Naomh Conaill	Gaoth Dobhair; Referee: ??? Man of the Match: ???

Round 3

23/9/2018	Naomh Conaill	1-9 - 0-9	St Eunan's	Glenties; Referee: ??? Man of the Match: ???

23/9/2018	An Clochán Liath	0-5 - 0-10	Gaoth Dobhair	An Clochán Liath; Referee: ??? Man of the Match: ???

=== Group C ===
Team	Pld	W	L	D	PF	PA	PD	Pts
St Michael's	3	3	0	0	62	24	+38	6
Four Masters	3	1	2	0	33	36	-3	2
Malin	3	1	2	0	38	47	-9	2
Termon	3	1	2	0	36	62	-26	2

Round 1

8/9/2018	Termon	0-9 - 3-16	St Michael's	Termon; Referee: ??? Man of the Match: ???

9/9/2018	Four Masters	1-10 - 0-6	Malin	Pairc Tir Conaill; Referee: ??? Man of the Match: ???

Round 2

15/9/2018	Malin	3-12 - 1-7	Termon	Malin; Referee: ??? Man of the Match: ???

16/9/2018	St Michael's	0-13 - 0-4	Four Masters	Dunfanaghy; Referee: ??? Man of the Match: ???

Round 3

22/9/2018	Termon	3-8 - 3-7	Four Masters	Termon; Referee: ??? Man of the Match: ???

22/9/2018	St Michael's	2-18 - 0-11	Malin	Dunfanaghy; Referee: ??? Man of the Match: ???

=== Group D ===
Team	Pld	W	L	D	PF	PA	PD	Pts
Cill Chartha	3	3	0	0	54	36	+18	6
Seán Mac Cumhaills	3	2	1	0	59	52	+7	4
Na Cealla Beaga	3	1	2	0	39	46	-7	2
Milford	3	0	3	0	41	59	-17	0

Round 1

8/9/2018	Milford	1-16 - 4-13	Seán Mac Cumhaills	Milford; Referee: ??? Man of the Match: ???

9/9/2018	Na Cealla Beaga	0-11 - 2-9	Cill Chartha	Na Cealla Beaga; Referee: ??? Man of the Match: ???

Round 2

16/9/2018	Seán Mac Cumhaills	3-12 - 0-15	Na Cealla Beaga	MacCumhaill Park; Referee: ??? Man of the Match: ???

16/9/2018	Cill Chartha	2-15 - 2-6	Milford	Cill Chartha; Referee: ??? Man of the Match: ???

Round 3

22/9/2018	Milford	0-10 - 1-10	Na Cealla Beaga	??? Referee: ??? Man of the Match: ???

22/9/2018	Seán Mac Cumhaills	1-10 - 1-15	Cill Chartha	MacCumhaill Park; Referee: ??? Man of the Match: ???

== Knock-out stage ==
=== Quarter-finals ===
29 September 2018	Seán Mac Cumhaills	2-10 - 0-13	St Michael's	O'Donnell Park; Referee: ??? Man of the Match: ???

29 September 2018	Glenswilly	0-12 - 0-5	Four Masters	MacCumhaill Park; Referee: ??? Man of the Match: ???

30 September 2018	Cill Chartha	0-6 - 1-9	Naomh Conaill	Páirc Tír Conaill; Referee: ??? Man of the Match: ???

30 September 2018	Gaoth Dobhair	8-13 - 3-12	Réalt na Mara	MacCumhaill Park; Referee: ??? Man of the Match: ???

=== Semi-finals ===
6 October 2018	Naomh Conaill	1-11 - 0-12	Glenswilly	MacCumhaill Park; Referee: ??? Man of the Match: ???

7 October 2018	Gaoth Dobhair	3-14 - 1-7	Seán MacCumhaills	MacCumhaill Park; Referee: ??? Man of the Match: ???

=== Final ===
21 October 2018; 16:00	Gaoth Dobhair	0-17 - 1-7	Naomh Conaill	MacCumhaill Park; Referee: ??? Man of the Match: ???

== Relegation play-offs ==
=== Relegation semi-finals ===
30 September 2018	An Clochán Liath	1-12 - 0-8	Burt	O'Donnell Park; Referee: ??? Man of the Match: ???

30 September 2018	Termon	2-14 - 1-13	Milford	Dunfanaghy; Referee: ??? Man of the Match: ???

=== Relegation final ===
6 October 2018	Milford	2-9 - 0-7	Burt	O'Donnell Park; Referee: ??? Man of the Match: ???

== Gradam Shéamuis Mhic Géidigh ==
Odhrán Mac Niallais was named as the recipient of the annual Gradam Shéamuis Mhic Géidigh.
