= List of Donegal inter-county footballers =

This is an incomplete list of Gaelic footballers who have played at senior level for the Donegal county team.

== List of players ==
=== A–C ===
- Tony Blake
- Ciaran Bonner
- Declan Bonner
- Seamus Bonner
- Brendan Boyle
- Manus Boyle
- Marty Boyle
- Michael Boyle
- Peter Boyle
- Ryan Bradley
- Jamie Brennan
- Paul Brennan
- Paul Callaghan
- Paddy Campbell
- Marty Carlin
- Michael Carr
- Paul Carr
- Shane Carr
- Michael Carroll
- Martin Carney
- Kevin Cassidy
- Mark Crossan
- Barry Cunningham
- John Cunningham

=== D–F ===
- Brendan Devenney
- Ciaran Diver
- Damian Diver
- Aaron Doherty
- Eamonn Doherty
- Thomas Donoghue
- John Duffy
- Conall Dunne
- Barry Dunnion
- Paul Durcan
- Sean Ferriter

=== G–L ===
- Eoghan Bán Gallagher
- John Bán Gallagher
- Matt Gallagher
- Neil Gallagher: Until 2017
- Oisín Gallen
- Martin Gavigan
- John Gildea
- Martin Griffin
- Stephen Griffin
- John Hannigan

   Anthony Harkin

- John Haran
- Michael Hegarty
- Noel Hegarty
- Paddy Hegarty
- Seamus Hoare
- Alan Kane
- Rory Kavanagh: Until 2017
- Luke Keaney
- Michael Kelly
- Karl Lacey: 2004–2017: 65 championship appearances
- Michael Lynch

=== Mac/Mc ===
- Jeaic Mac Ceallabhuí
- Odhrán Mac Niallais
- Patrick McBrearty
- Stephen McBrearty
- Johnny McCafferty
- Andrew McClean
- Tony McClenaghan
- Brendan McCole
- Paddy McConigley
- Stephen McDermott
- Martin McElhinney
- Brian McEniff
- Antoin McFadden
- Colm McFadden: 173 appearances, until 2016
- Hugh McFadden
- Eamon McGee: 12 years, until 2016
- Jason McGee
- Neil McGee: 2005–2022: 195 appearances
- Eoghan McGettigan
- Leslie McGettigan
- Paul McGettigan
- Ciaran McGinley
- Mark Anthony McGinley
- Mick McGinley
- Noel McGinley
- Peter McGinley
- Frank McGlynn: 14 years, until 2019
- Caolan McGonagle
- Paul McGonigle
- Barry McGowan
- Mark McGowan
- Paddy McGrath: 12 years, until 2021
- Charles McGuinness
- Jim McGuinness
- Eoin McHugh
- James McHugh
- Mark McHugh
- Martin McHugh
- Ryan McHugh
- Daniel McLaughlin
- Leo McLoone: 109 appearances, until 2019
- Kevin McMenamin
- Stephen McMenamin
- Joyce McMullan
- Pauric McShea

=== M–O ===
- Sylvester Maguire
- Anthony Molloy
- Dermot Molloy
- Barry Monaghan
- Donal Monaghan
- Conor Morrison
- Charlie Mulgrew
- Cian Mulligan
- Nathan Mullins
- Brian Murray
- Michael Murphy: 2007–2022
- Des Newton
- Conor O'Donnell (Carndonagh)
- Conor O'Donnell Snr (St Eunan's)
- Ethan O'Donnell
- Niall O'Donnell
- Martin O'Reilly

=== P–W ===
- Shaun Patton
- Kevin Rafferty
- Donal Reid
- Brian Roper
- James Ruane
- Tommy Ryan
- Martin Shovlin
- Matthew Smyth
- Ciarán Thompson
- Leon Thompson
- Anthony Thompson
- Christy Toye: Until 2017
- Eoin Waide
- David Walsh: Until 2017
- Declan Walsh
- Gary Walsh
- Caolan Ward
- Joe Winston
- Peter Witherow
