= Pobalscoil Chloich Cheannfhaola =

PCC

Location
- Falcarragh, County Donegal, Ireland; 55°08′31″N 8°06′00″W

Information
- Type: Secondary School (Public)
- Religious affiliation: Inter Denominational
- Established: 1967
- Principal: Maeve Sweeney
- Enrollment: 417

Pobalscoil Chloich Cheannfhaola (PCC), also known as PCC Falcarragh, is a voluntary/state-funded, coeducational, inter-denominational secondary school in Falcarragh, County Donegal, Ireland. Located north of the town centre of Falcarragh, its catchment area includes the districts of Cloughaneely, Dunfanaghy and Creeslough, although they have also traditionally attracted some students from Gweedore and The Rosses.

== History ==
Pobalscoil Chloich Cheannfhaola was founded in 1972, replacing Gortahork Vocational School, which had been the main secondary school in the area since 1961.

== Sport ==
Soccer, Gaelic football and basketball are the main sporting activities of the school. The school has won several All-Ireland and Ulster titles in all three sports.

=== Honours ===
==== Soccer ====
All-Ireland

- 1981/82 FAI Schools Senior A Boys (U-19) Champions
- 2017/18 FAI Schools Minor B Boys (U-15) Champions
- 2018/19 FAI Schools Minor B Boys (U-15) Champions

Ulster

- 1981/82 FAI Schools Senior A Boys (U-19) Champions
- 2001/02 FAI Schools Senior A Boys (U-19) Champions
- 2005/06 FAI Schools Senior A Boys (U-19) Champions
- 2017/18 FAI Schools Senior B Boys (U-19) Champions
- 2017/18 FAI Schools Junior B Boys (U-17) Champions
- 2017/18 FAI Schools Minor B Boys (U-15) Champions
- 2018/19 FAI Schools Junior B Boys (U-17) Champions
- 2018/19 FAI Schools Minor B Boys (U-15) Champions
- 2019/20 FAI Schools Minor B Boys (U-15) Champions

==== Gaelic Football ====
Ulster Under 19

- 1973/74 Dalton Cup (Ulster U-19 B) Champions
- 1982/83 MacLarnon Cup (Ulster U-19 B) Champions
- 1984/85 MacLarnon Cup (Ulster U-19 B) Champions
- 1985/86 MacLarnon Cup (Ulster U-19 B) Champions

Ulster Under 17

- 1982/83 Ulster Herald Cup (Ulster U-17 B) Champions

Ulster Under 16

- 2013/14 Arthurs Cup (Ulster U-16 A) Champions

Ulster Under 15

- 1978/79 Loch an Iúir Cup (Ulster U-15 B) Champions
- 1980/81 Loch an Iúir Cup (Ulster U-15 B) Champions

Ulster Under 14

- 1979/80 Corn Cholm Cille (Ulster U-14 B) Champions
- 1988/89 Corn Cholm Cille (Ulster U-14 B) Champions
- 2016/17 McDevitt Cup (Ulster U-14 C) Champions

Donegal

- 2004/05 Donegal Senior A Champions
- 2013/14 Donegal U-16 A Champions
- 2015/16 Donegal U-14 A Champions
- 2018/19 Donegal U-16 A Champions

== Notable alumni ==
=== Gaelic football ===
- Kevin Cassidy — Donegal and Gaoth Dobhair Gaelic football Captain, and two-time All-Star (2002, 2011)
- Barry Cunningham — Donegal and Killybegs Gaelic footballer, and member of 1992's All-Ireland winning team
- John Cunningham — Donegal and Killybegs Gaelic footballer, and member of 1992's All-Ireland winning team
- Michael Langan - Donegal and St Michael's Gaelic footballer, All-Star (2025)
- Martin McElhinney — Donegal and St Michael's Gaelic footballer, and member of 2012's All-Ireland winning team
- Eamon McGee — Donegal and Gaoth Dobhair Gaelic footballer, and member of 2012's All-Ireland winning team
- Jason McGee — Donegal and Cloughaneely Gaelic footballer
- Neil McGee — Donegal and Gaoth Dobhair Gaelic footballer, member of 2012's All-Ireland winning team, and three-time All-Star (2011, 2012, 2014)
- Barry McGowan — Donegal and Killybegs Gaelic footballer, and member of 1992's All-Ireland winning team
- Brian McLaughlin — Donegal and St Michael's Gaelic footballer
- Daniel McLaughlin — Donegal and St Michael's Gaelic footballer, and member of 2012's All-Ireland winning team
- Christy Toye — Donegal and St Michael's Gaelic football Captain, and member of 2012's All-Ireland winning team
- Peter Witherow — Donegal and St Michael's Gaelic footballer, and member of 2012's All-Ireland winning team

=== Other ===
- Annemarie Ní Churreáin — poet
- Breandán de Gallaí — professional Irish dancer who is best known for his lead role in Riverdance
- Pauric Sweeney — Luxury handbag designer
