= Jimmy White (Gaelic footballer) =

Gaelic footballer

Jimmy White is a Gaelic football referee, administrator, coach, manager, player-manager and former player. He is from Killybegs.

== Career ==
As an inter-county manager White led Donegal to an Ulster Minor Football Championship in 1985, and Ulster League title in the same year. He served as part of P. J. McGowan's backroom team when Donegal won the 1987 All-Ireland Under-21 Football Championship.

White was a wing-back and was part of the CLG Na Cealla Beaga team that won five Donegal Senior Football Championship titles, in 1988, 1991, 1992, 1995 and 1996, and he played in two other finals without winning, in 1990 and 1993. He was involved in six of the seven finals, missing the 1996 final, even though he had played in each of the earlier matches in the competition. He served as player-manager of the team during this time as well, including in the championship winning seasons of 1991, 1992 and 1995, as well as helping the team to record three consecutive Division One League titles between 1991 and 1993. He did so after John Joe O'Shea, a Kerry native, stood aside as manager.

When he stopped playing as 1996 drew to close, White began refereeing. He rose to inter-county level and was involved at all grades of the game from minor to senior. He was noted for his fitness levels and a characteristic calmness.

White officiated at his first Donegal Senior Final in 1999. He refereed his sixth Donegal Senior Final twenty years later, in 2019 (first replay), tying the all-time record, having earlier been a linesman in the drawn match. His finals in between were 2003, 2005, 2006 and 2011, and there was also the 2005 replay, which was when Naomh Conaill won their first title.

White refereed several senior inter-county championship finals, as well as an All-Ireland Championship final. He was the first Donegal man to referee an Ulster final in 2008. He was referee for the 2010 Connacht SFC final. But, as he reached his fiftieth birthday the same year, he became the first inter-county referee who was forced against his will to stop officiating at inter-county level, in accordance with a recently passed motion of the GAA that ruled in favour of an age limit. His last game as an inter-county referee was the 2011 Dr McKenna Cup final between Derry and Tyrone.

White continues to referee club games. In 2019, he had to leave the field of play on a stretcher after hurting his ankle. His club record includes two Ulster Club Championship finals.

White also works as a tutor for aspiring referees. His daughter has played inter-county football for Donegal.
