= CLG Na Cealla Beaga =

Donegal-based Gaelic games club

CLG na Cealla Beaga
- Na Cealla Beaga
- Founded: 1924
- County: Donegal
- Nickname: The Fishermen
- Colours: Red and White
- Grounds: Eamonn Byrne Memorial Park
- Coordinates: 54°38′17.62″N 8°29′05.29″W

Playing kits
Standard colours

Senior Club Championships
	All Ireland	Ulster champions	Donegal champions
Football:	-	-	6

CLG na Cealla Beaga is a GAA club based in Killybegs, County Donegal, Ireland.

They have won the Donegal Senior Football Championship on six occasions, most recently in 1996.

They have an intense rivalry with Cill Chartha.

== History ==
Founded in 1924, the club have had teams break up several times in their history. They play football only, though — in the past — played hurling too.

From 1967, the team played at the coastal venue Fintra Park, subsequently renamed McDevitt Park; that year Donegal and Mayo played a game to mark its opening.

They contested the Donegal SFC decider seven times between 1988 and 1996, winning five of them. The first of the five was the defeat of local rivals Cill Chartha in the 1988 decider. It ended a 36-year wait for the Donegal SFC and was only the second time the club had won the competition. Of that team Manus Boyle, Barry Cunningham, John Cunningham, John Bán Gallagher, Barry McGowan and Conor White had won the 1987 All-Ireland Under-21 Football Championship the previous year, while Mark Boyle, Stephen Burke, Barry Cunningham Jnr and David Meehan had played for Donegal in the Ulster Minor Football Championship and also the Donegal under-21 football team. Boyle, Barry Cunningham, John Cunningham and McGowan would go on to win the 1992 All-Ireland Senior Football Championship. John Joe O'Shea, a Kerry native teaching at Killybegs Vocational School, was manager of the senior team in 1988 after a fruitful spell as underage manager. The second final of the seven was a loss to Naomh Columba in 1990, the third a 2–11 to 2–9 victory over Red Hughs in 1991. The fourth of the seven finals occurred in 1992 and involved Naomh Columba again, though this time Naomh Columba lost. The fifth final was in 1993; Cill Chartha defeated them. They then won consecutive Donegal SFCs for a second time in 1995 and 1996. Jimmy White took over as player-manager from O'Shea at the beginning of 1991; he had no selectors and Michael Gallagher trained the team. The 1996 Donegal SFC has been described as "probably the greatest ever championship in Donegal", with the club playing nine games to lift the trophy that year.

In the midst of this successful run, the club reached the final of the 1991 Ulster Senior Club Football Championship. Denis Carberry was team captain that year. However, one third of the team were absent for the Ulster campaign due to employment in fishing in the North Atlantic: these were Carberry, Conor White, David Meehan, Rory McNelis and Mickey Campbell. They were the away side in both the quarter-final and semi-final, defeating Derry champions Dungiven (featuring Joe Brolly) in the former and Down champions Downpatrick in the latter. Ahead of the final in Omagh, John Bán Gallagher got injured. Carberry, Meehan and White were flown back to the mainland to compete in the game. However, the team lost to Castleblayney Faughs by a scoreline of 0–8 to 0–6. Tony Hegarty had a late goal chance that would have won the game but it went inches wide. Declan Boyle and Peter McGinley, who would later play under-21 and senior football for the county, also emerged aged 17 in 1991; Boyle played in all the club's games during the 1991 Donegal and Ulster Club SFC campaign, while McGinley only played in the three Ulster Club SFC matches. Boyle drifted away from the game and ended up involved in association football, eventually making it as far as a reserve team in Scotland and was last heard of overseeing an under-17 team in that sport, but back in Ireland.

Forward Paul "Feet" Murrin was part of the team that won consecutive Donegal SFCs in 1995 and 1996, becoming one of the county's most recognisable sportsmen.

By 2002 the club had no senior representatives on the county team. The club were thrown out of the 2002 Donegal Senior Football Championship at the semi-final stage after breaking the rules.

They came from nowhere to reach the final of the 2010 Donegal Senior Football Championship, with Manus Boyle even coming out of retirement at the age of 44. But Naomh Conaill defeated them, following a series of injuries in advance that made competing in that game all the more difficult for the Peter McGinley-managed team. A further final appearance came in the 2013 Donegal Senior Football Championship; this time they lost to Glenswilly. Benny Boyle captained the club in that game.

== Notable players ==
- Manus Boyle — 1992 All-Ireland SFC winner
- Shane Boyle — 2006 Ulster MFC winner
- Séamus Coleman — now a professional soccer player
- Barry Cunningham — 1992 All-Ireland SFC winner
- John Cunningham — 1992 All-Ireland SFC winner
- Eoghan Bán Gallagher — 2018 and 2019 Ulster SFC winner
- John Bán Gallagher — 1990 Ulster SFC winner
- Hugh McFadden — 2014, 2018 and 2019 Ulster SFC winner
- Peter McGinley
- Barry McGowan — 1992 All-Ireland SFC winner
- Jason Noctor
- Matthew Smyth
- Jimmy White

== Managers ==
Years	Manager
1924–1980s?	—
c. 1988–1991	John Joe O'Shea
Early 1991–199?	Jimmy White
c. 1996	Pauric McShea (coach?)
c. 1996–200?	—
?–2008	Manus Boyle and Barry McGowan
2008/09–?	—
c. 2010–?	Peter McGinley
201?–c. 2013	Joe McBrearty
c. 2013	Martin "Slua" Boyle
201?–201?	—
201?–202?	John Cunningham
2022–202?	Shane Molloy and Antoine O'Hara
2024–	Pauric Bonner

== Honours ==
- Ulster Senior Club Football Championship runner-up: 1991
- Donegal Senior Football Championship winner: 1952, 1988, 1991, 1992, 1995, 1996
- Donegal Senior Football Championship runner-up: 1990, 1993, 2010, 2013
- Donegal Intermediate Football Championship winner: 1979
- Donegal Junior Football Championship winner: 1976
