= Brian Roper (Gaelic footballer) =

Irish Gaelic footballer

Personal information
- Born: 1974 or 1975 (age 51–52) Boston, United States of America
- Height: 5 ft 6 in (168 cm)

Sport
- Sport: Gaelic football
- Position: Forward
Club
- Years: Club
- 1992–2013: Aodh Ruadh
Inter-county
- Years: County
- 1995–2009: Donegal
Inter-county titles
- NFL: 1

Brian Roper (born 1974/5) is an American Gaelic footballer who has lived in Ireland most of his life, and who played for Aodh Ruadh and the Donegal county team.

Roper preferred to play centre-forward, but tended to play at wing-forward for Donegal. Brian McEniff described him as one of the best forwards in the country for the best part of a decade and a half.

He won an Ulster Under-21 Football Championship. However, he never won the Ulster Senior Football Championship during his career.

== Early life ==
His family own a monumental masonry firm. His father P. J. would attend underage matches where he would umpire, be a linesman or kit collector. Roper attended De La Salle College Ballyshannon, where he won the McLarnon Cup and received a Colleges All Star, and was mentored by future county teammate Noel Hegarty. When he was fifteen years of age he injured his knee ligaments while playing association football on the beach at Rossnowlagh near his family home and was unable to play sport for a year. Shortly afterwards, his father died suddenly due to a brain haemorrhage.

== Playing career ==
=== Club ===
Roper won three Donegal Senior Football Championships and one League with Aodh Ruadh. His first Donegal SFC was in 1994 before he was called into the senior county team.

=== Inter-county ===
Roper won an Ulster Under-21 Football Championship medal with Donegal in 1995.

P. J. McGowan was the manager to introduce Roper to the Donegal senior team.

He made his championship debut against Down in Clones, scoring a point in a one-point loss.

Though, upon his retirement, the Donegal Democrat said Roper's championship debut came in 1996 against Antrim in Ballybofey, having made several appearances in the National Football League earlier that year. The paper said P. J. McGowan called himself, Damian Diver, Adrian Sweeney, Peter McGinley, Dessie McNamara and Martin Coll into the county senior squad following the county's 1995 Ulster Under-21 Football Championship winning campaign.

Roper missed the 1998 Ulster Senior Football Championship final with a hamstring injury.

He played in the 2003 All-Ireland Senior Football Championship semi-final against Armagh, scoring a point.

He was a member of the Donegal team that won the National Football League in 2007, scoring three points in the final against Mayo. As a result of this he was honoured by both the Opel GPA awards and the Vodafone Allstars. He retired from the county team in 2009 with a record number of appearances. His last game was the 2009 All-Ireland Senior Football Championship quarter-final loss to Cork.

== Management career ==
In November 2017, he became part of Gary McDaid's backroom team when McDaid became the first manager of the new Donegal under-20 football team.

== Personal life ==
His other interests include scuba diving and the English association football club Manchester United.

== Honours ==
Donegal

- National Football League: 2007
- Dr McKenna Cup: 2009
- Ulster Under-21 Football Championship: 1995

Aodh Ruadh

- Donegal Senior Football Championship: 1994, 1997, 1998
- League X1: ?

Individual

- All Star Footballer of the Month: April 2007
- GPA Footballer of the Month: April 2007
