= Killybegs =

Fishing port in County Donegal, Ireland

Killybegs Na Cealla Beaga
- Town
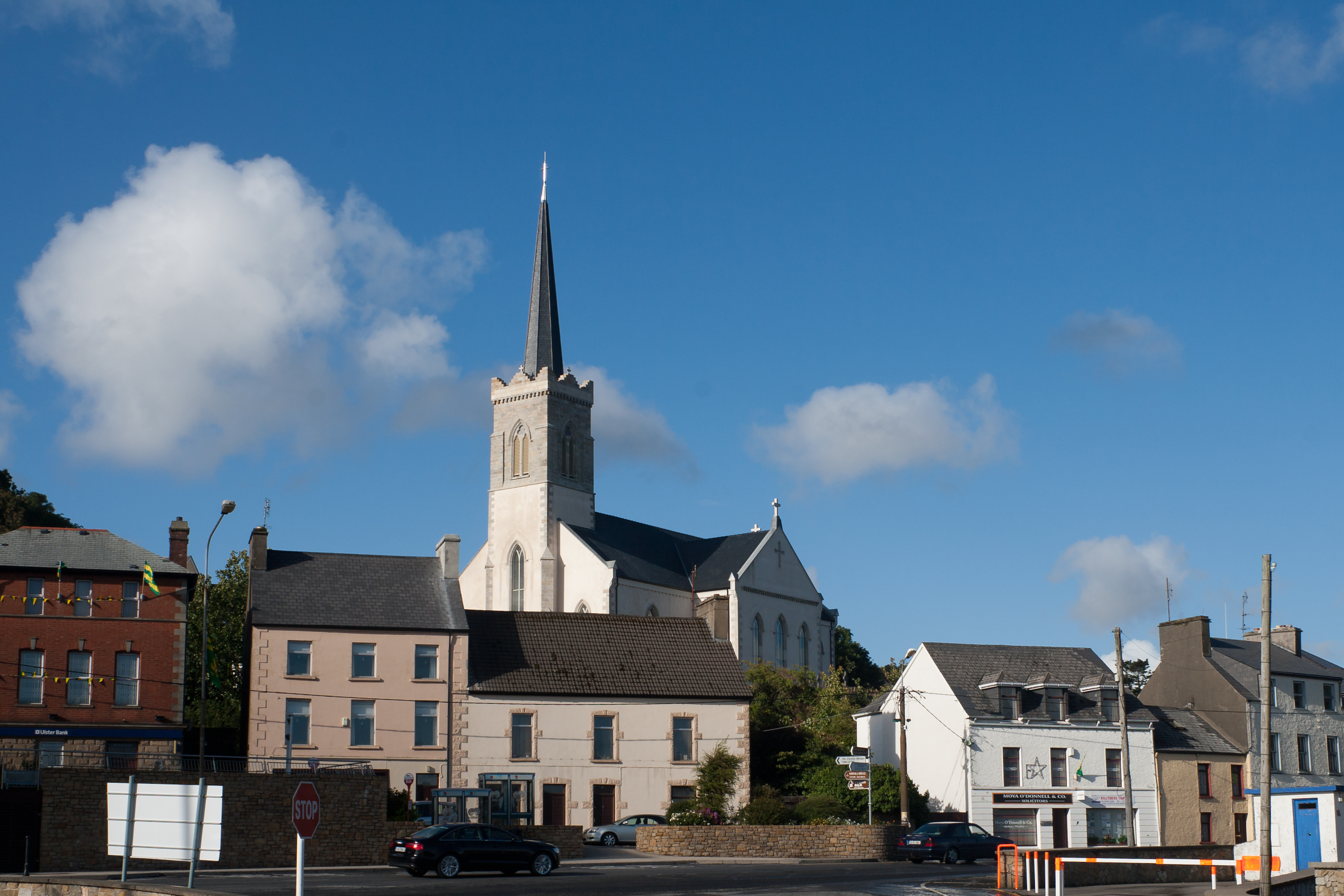
- Killybegs skyline

- Location in Ireland
- Coordinates: 54°38′10″N 8°26′40″W
- Country: Ireland
- Province: Ulster
- County: County Donegal
- Barony: Banagh (Irish: Báinigh)

Government
  - Dáil Éireann: Donegal

Population (2022)
  - Total: 1,258
- Time zone: UTC+0 (WET)
  - Summer (DST): UTC+1 (IST (WEST))
- Irish Grid Reference: G711767

Killybegs (Irish: Na Cealla Beaga) is a town in County Donegal, Ireland. It is located on the south coast of the county, north of Donegal Bay, near Donegal Town. Its Irish name, Na Cealla Beaga, means 'little cells', a reference to early monastic settlements. The town is situated at the head of a scenic harbour and at the base of a vast mountainous tract extending northward. In the summer, there is a street festival celebrating the fish catches and incorporating the traditional "Blessing of the Boats". As of 2022, the population was 1,258.

== History ==
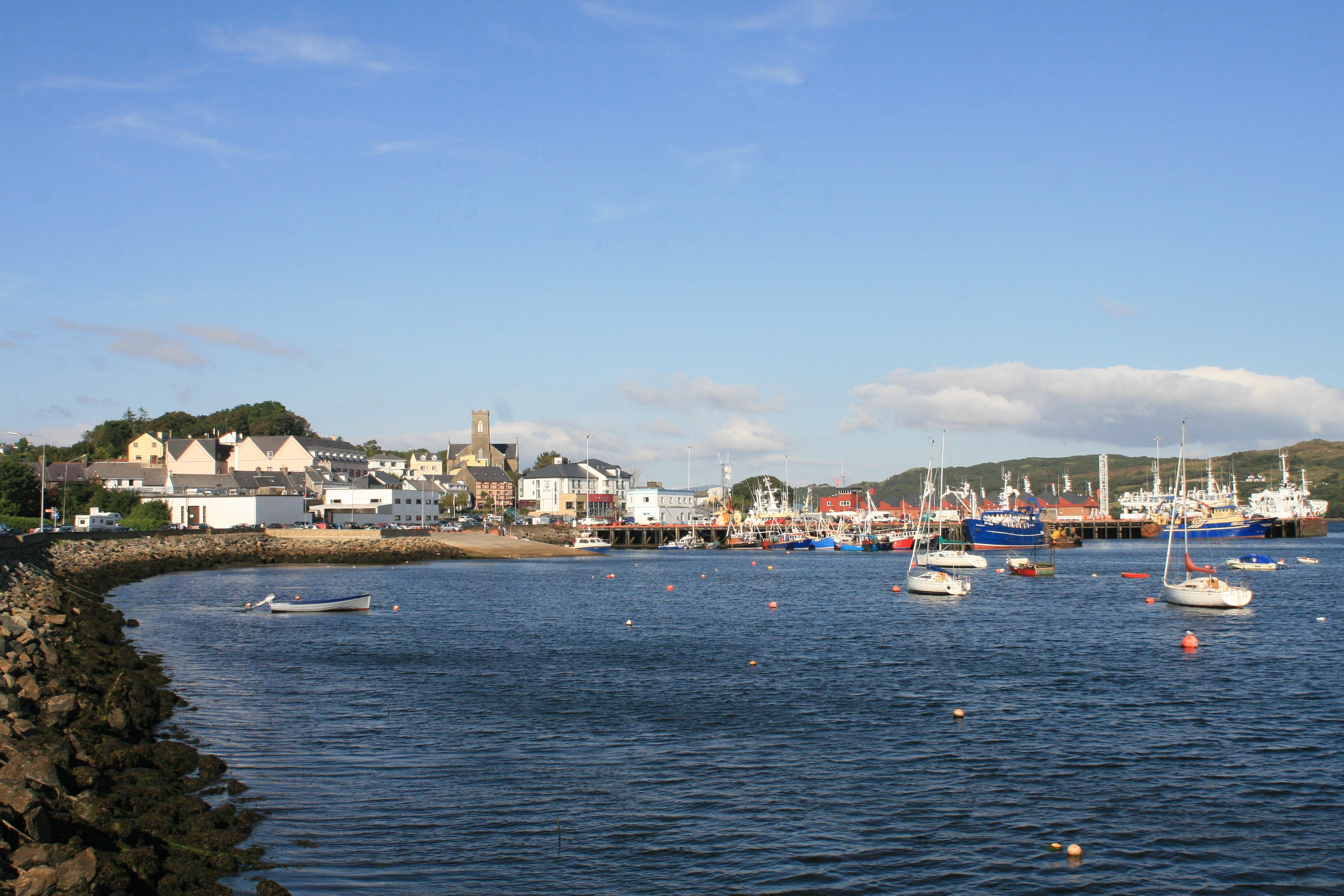
Killybegs is the busiest and most important fishing port in all of Ireland, and its harbour is often full of trawlers.

There are at least six Court cairns dating from the Neolithic period located in the Killybegs area. Two of the largest are Shalwy (130 feet long) and Croagh Beg (120 feet long). In 1588, Killybegs was the last port of call for the Spanish vessel La Girona, which had dropped anchor in the harbour when the Spanish Armada fetched up on the Irish coast during Spain's war with England. With the assistance of a Killybegs chieftain, MacSweeney Bannagh, the Girona's personnel were fed, her rudder repaired, and she set sail for Scotland, but was wrecked off the Antrim coast with the loss of nearly 1,300 lives.

In 1893 a railway station opened in the town, connecting it to Donegal town, but the line closed in 1960.

Bridge Street in the town centre was flooded during Storm Bert in November 2024.

== Fishing industry ==
Killybegs is a natural deepwater harbour with a depth of 12 metres at low water spring tide at the new €50 million pier completed in 2004. The harbour is home to all the largest Irish midwater pelagic trawlers and a modest whitefish fleet, but it handles many other types of shipping as well. These include passenger cruise liners and mixed specialist cargoes. In recent years Killybegs has become the favoured port for the importation of wind turbines and is a service port for the offshore gas/oil drilling rigs.

The town is the centre of the Irish pelagic fishing and processing industries, for it specialises in the processing and freezing of species such as mackerel, herring, scad, and blue whiting. The finished processed fish is exported to markets in Africa, the Middle East and Europe by freezer ships. However, due to blanket enforcement of EU fishing regulations on Irish vessels by the Irish Department of the Marine, beginning in 2005, and mackerel shoals remaining longer in Norwegian waters, there has been a downturn in the fishing industry in the town. This has led to redundancies in the fish processing industry, in which the fish factory workers have been the hardest hit.

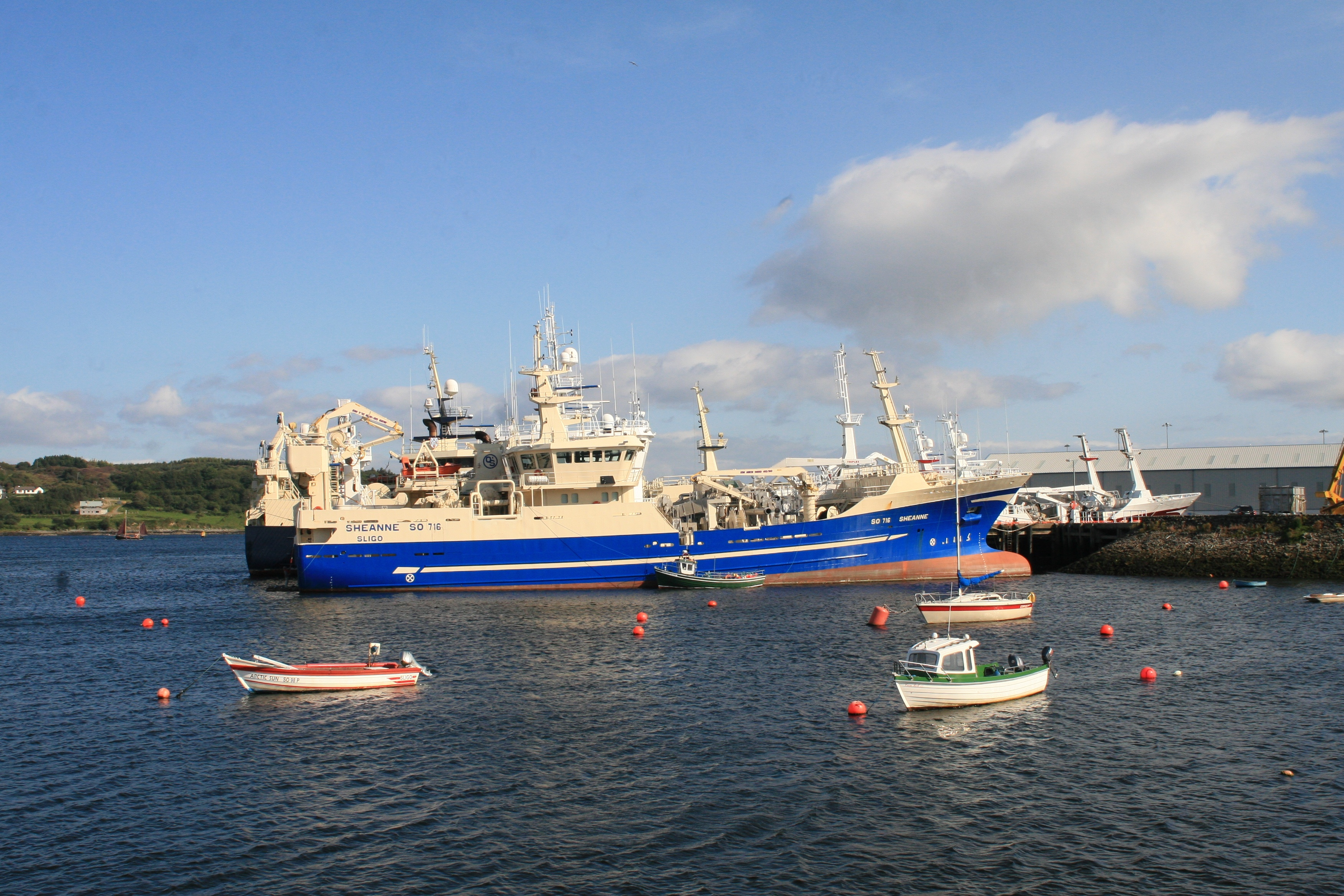
RSW Pelagic Trawler Sheanne SO716 in Killybegs, 2007

== Education ==
The first national school, known as 'Killybegs National School', and later as the 'Commons National School', opened in 1834 on a site originally provided by the Plantation Commissioners in the reign of King James I. There are three national schools and one second-level school in Killybegs, as well as a third-level institution, Tourism College Killybegs, the only dedicated tourism institute in Ireland, offering courses in hospitality, tourism and culinary skills. The college was academically integrated with Letterkenny Institute of Technology since 2001, and ATU Donegal since 2022.

St Catherine's Vocational School is a non-denominational, co-educational second-level school. There are twenty-six teaching staff, five special needs assistants and three support staff. The student population is 385 and the male-to-female student ratio is approximately 50:50. The present two-storey building opened in 1987 provides facilities for students, teachers and members of the community. St Catherine's has a range of extracurricular activities, the school has had success in English, Irish and science debates. The arts are well provided for with an art and music department, the music department has staged a number of musical productions, and students are taught a variety of instruments. Sport is also an important aspect of school life students participate in teams representing the school in soccer, Gaelic football, athletics, basketball and rugby.

== Transport ==
=== Road ===
Killybegs is on the R263 road, joining the N56 road 3 km to the north.

=== Bus ===
The town is on several bus routes with many buses each day.

Local Link route 293, and Bus Éireann routes 490 and 492, operate to and from Donegal town and other local places. McGeehan Coaches operates a route 991 to/from Letterkenny and other local places.

=== Rail ===
There is no longer a rail service to Killybegs. A railway line opened on 18 October 1893 on the Donegal Railway Company (DR) line from Donegal town to Killybegs. The Donegal town to Killybegs branch of the DR terminated at the harbour and some of the remains can still be seen to this day. The railway was closed on 1 January 1960.

== Fintra Strand ==
Fintra Strand (Irish: Fionntrá), a registered blue flag beach, is located on the western outskirts of Killybegs. It consists entirely of fine golden sand and receives large numbers of day-trippers during the peak of the tourist season. It is lifeguarded throughout the bathing season.

== Donegal Carpets ==
Killybegs is famous for its tapestries and carpets, some of which were produced on the biggest carpet loom in the world at the "Donegal Carpet Factory". The carpets, known as Donegals, are hand-knotted in the Turkish style. The carpets have adorned many important buildings in Ireland such as Dublin Castle, the Royal Hospital Kilmainham, Áras an Uachtaráin and internationally the Vatican, The White House, Buckingham Palace, 10 Downing Street and most state buildings around the world. The factory in Killybegs closed in 2003 and has been open since 2006 as the Maritime & Heritage Centre. The Centre provides information on carpet making and the fishing industry. Tours are conducted daily and visitors can watch smaller carpets being made and try making a knot.

== Sport ==
The local GAA club is Na Cealla Beaga. They play their home games at Eamon Byrne Memorial Park.

The local association football club, St Catherine's, was founded in 1896. They play their home games at Emerald Park.

Killybegs Rowing Club can often be seen training in the harbour during the summer months and hold an annual regatta on the last weekend of July. The club row the Donegal Skiff, the traditional skiff of the county.

== Killybegs in literature ==
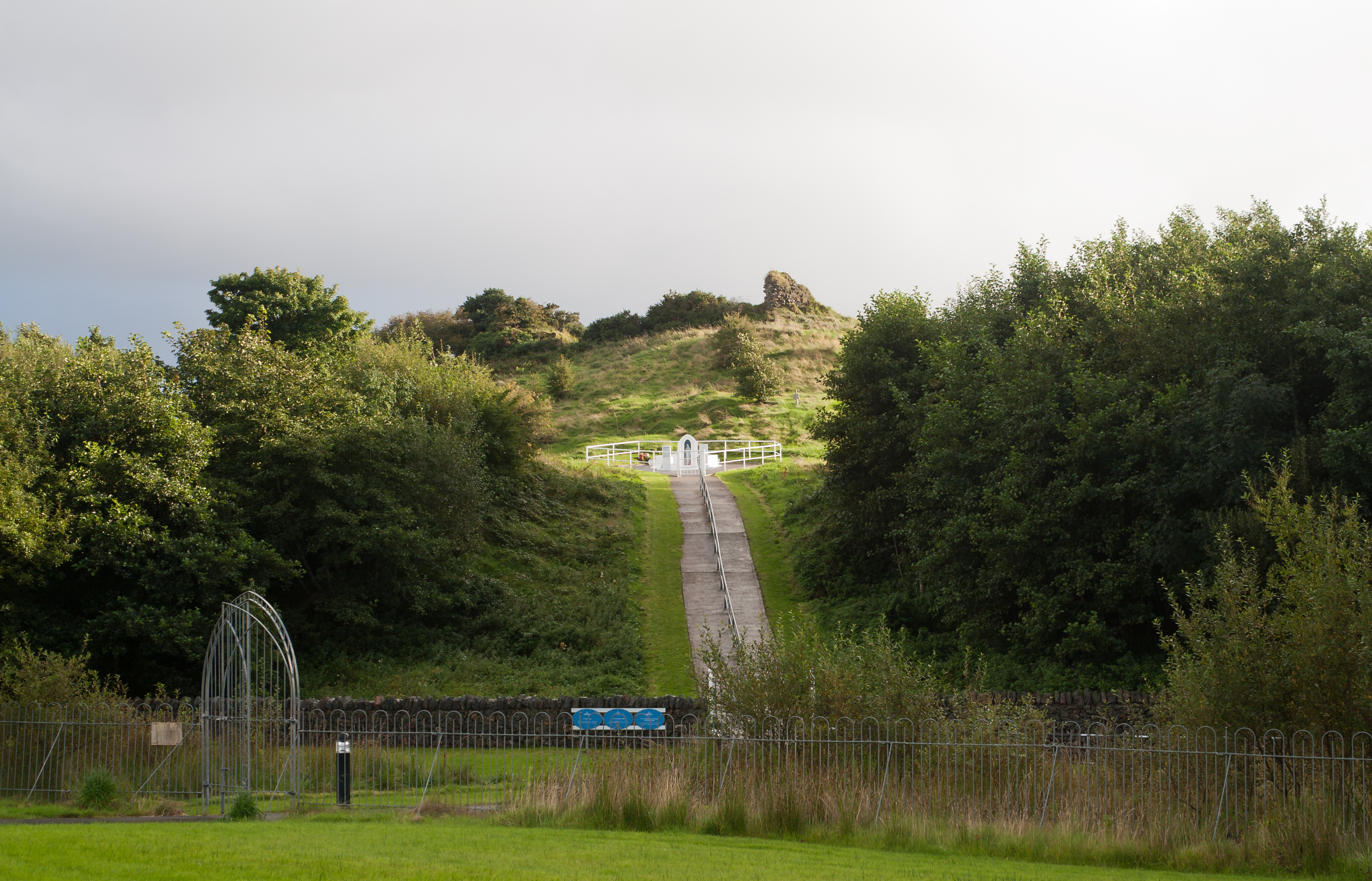
St. Catherine's Well and the remnants of Cat Castle.

Killybegs authors: John C. Ward: An Teagasg Criostaidhe fa Choinne Dioghoise Ratha Bhota 1891; Turas na croiche agus an Choróin Mhuire maille le dántaibh diadha 1892; Na hEipistil agus na soisgéil do na Domhnaigh agus na laetha saoire arna dtarraingt go Gaeilge 1904; An Cruinneolaí 1906; Leabhar filíochta fa choinne na scoil 1909 (with Padraig O'Beirne).

Thomas Colin MacGinley ('Kinnfaela'): The Cliff Scenery of South-Western Donegal 1867 (Reprinted by the Four Masters Press 2000); General Biology 1874.

Very Reverend James Stephens, P.P.: Illustrated Handbook of The Scenery and Antiquities of South-Western Donegal 1872.

Charles Conaghan: History and Antiquities of Killybegs 1975.

Dr Donald Martin: Killybegs Then and Now 1998; Killybegs-Down Memory Lane 2011.

Pat Conaghan: Bygones 1989; The Great Famine in South-West Donegal 1845–1850 1997; The Zulu Fishermen 2003; Steamed Fish (The Phoenix No 2, Winter 1991/2); Stranorlar, Not San Francisco (The Phoenix No 3, Spring 1992).

Bella McGee (poet) James Conwell (poet) Padraig O'Beirne (poet) e.g.: Mo Phiopa Gairid Donn (n.d).

In 2011, French novelist Sorj Chalandon published "fr:Retour à Killybegs" ("Return to Killybegs") whose main character, Tyrone Meehan, is a native of Killybegs.

Garrett Carr: The Boy from the Sea. 2025

== People ==
- Manus Boyle (born 1966) – Gaelic footballer
- Brian Brady (1903–1949) – Fianna Fáil politician
- Séamus Coleman (born 1988) – professional footballer who captains both Premier League club Everton and the Republic of Ireland national team.
- Barry Cunningham (born 1965) – Gaelic footballer
- Paddy McClafferty (born 2004) – international footballer with Gibraltar.
- Hugh McFadden (born 1994) – Gaelic footballer
- Barry McGowan (born 1967) – Gaelic footballer
- Thomas Pringle (born 1967) – Independent politician who was formerly a TD
- Kevin Sharkey (born 1961) – Dublin-based artist and musician
- Noelle Vial (1959–2003) – poet
- Peter J. Ward (1891–1970) – Sinn Féin politician

== Gallery ==
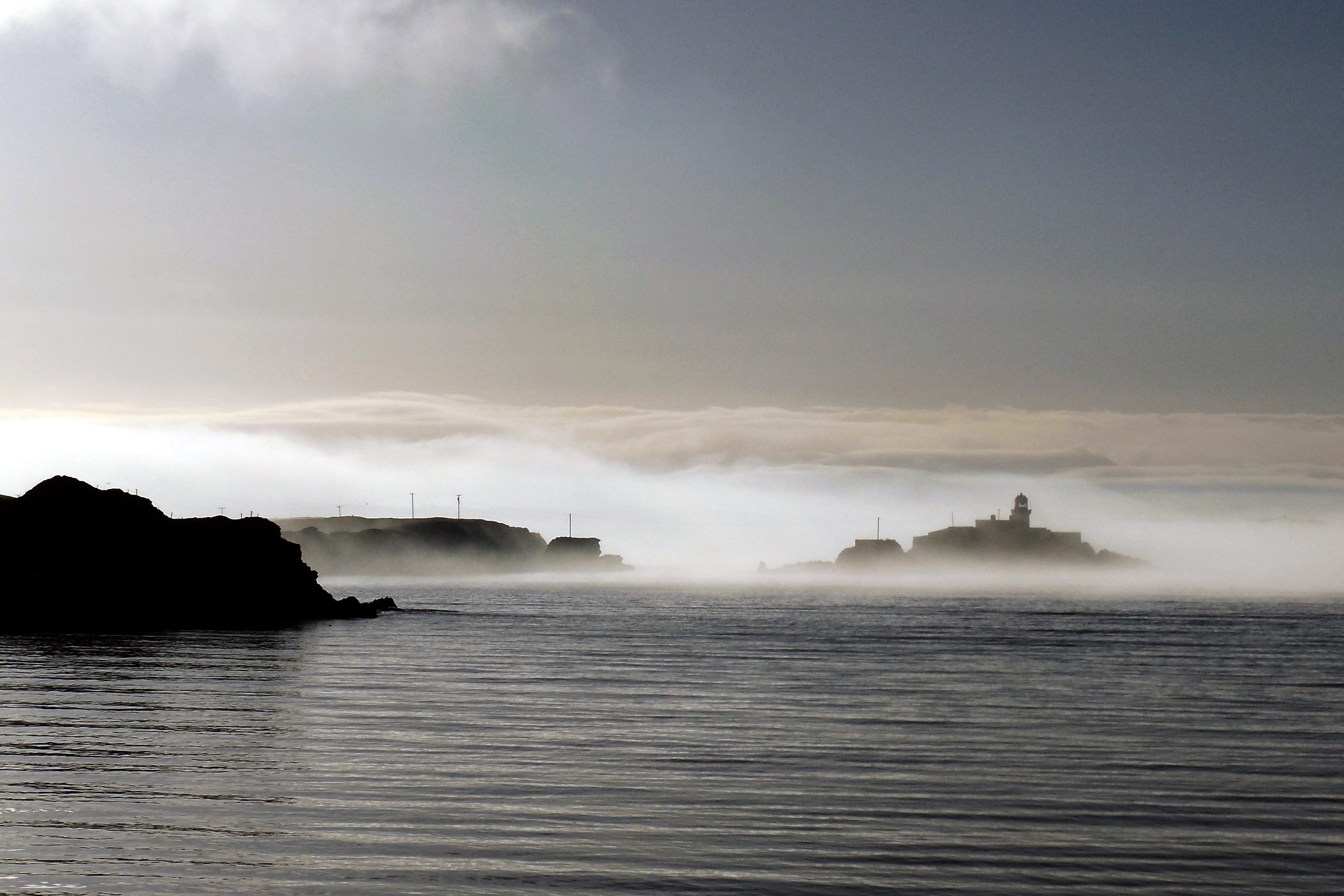

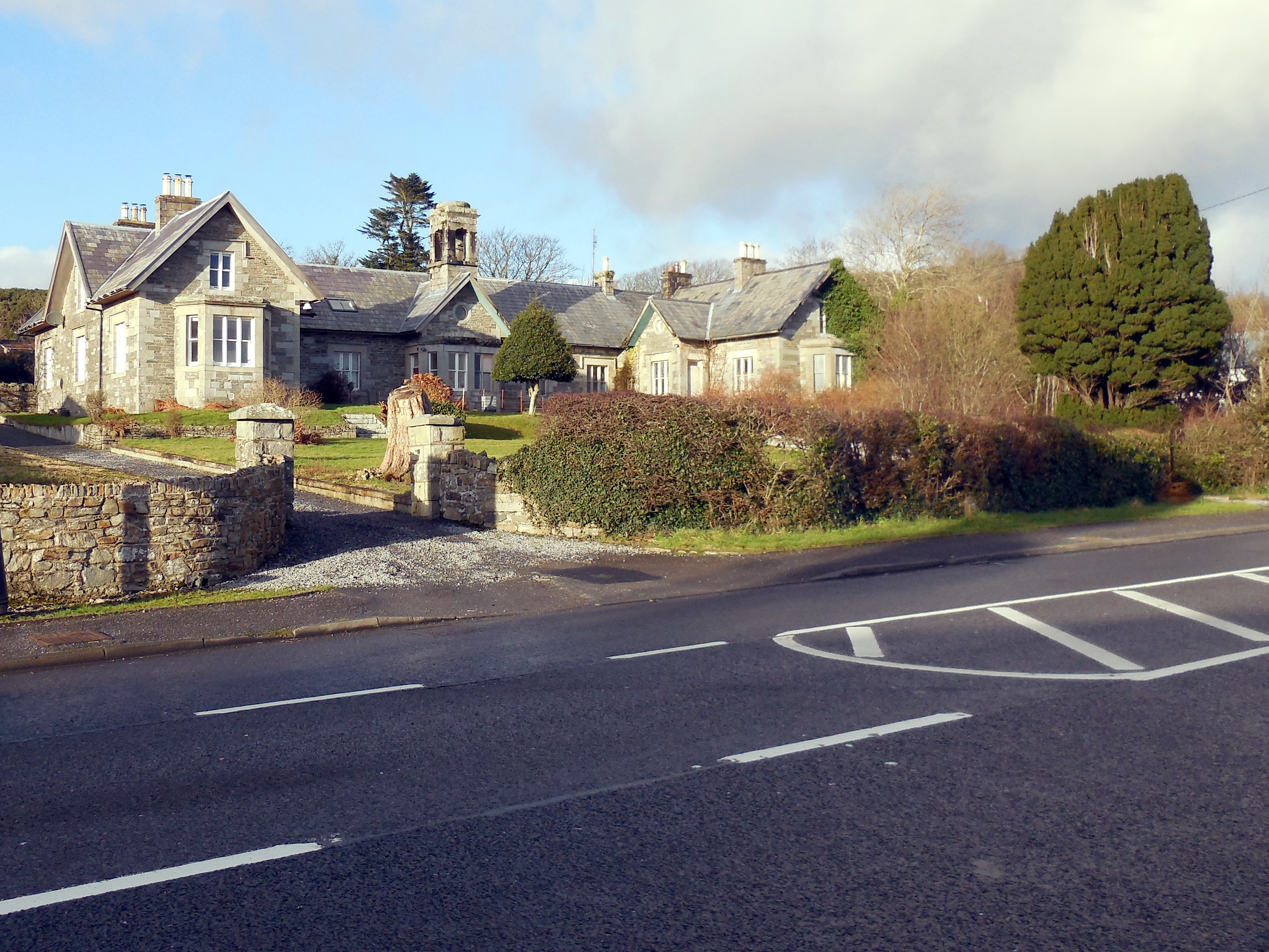

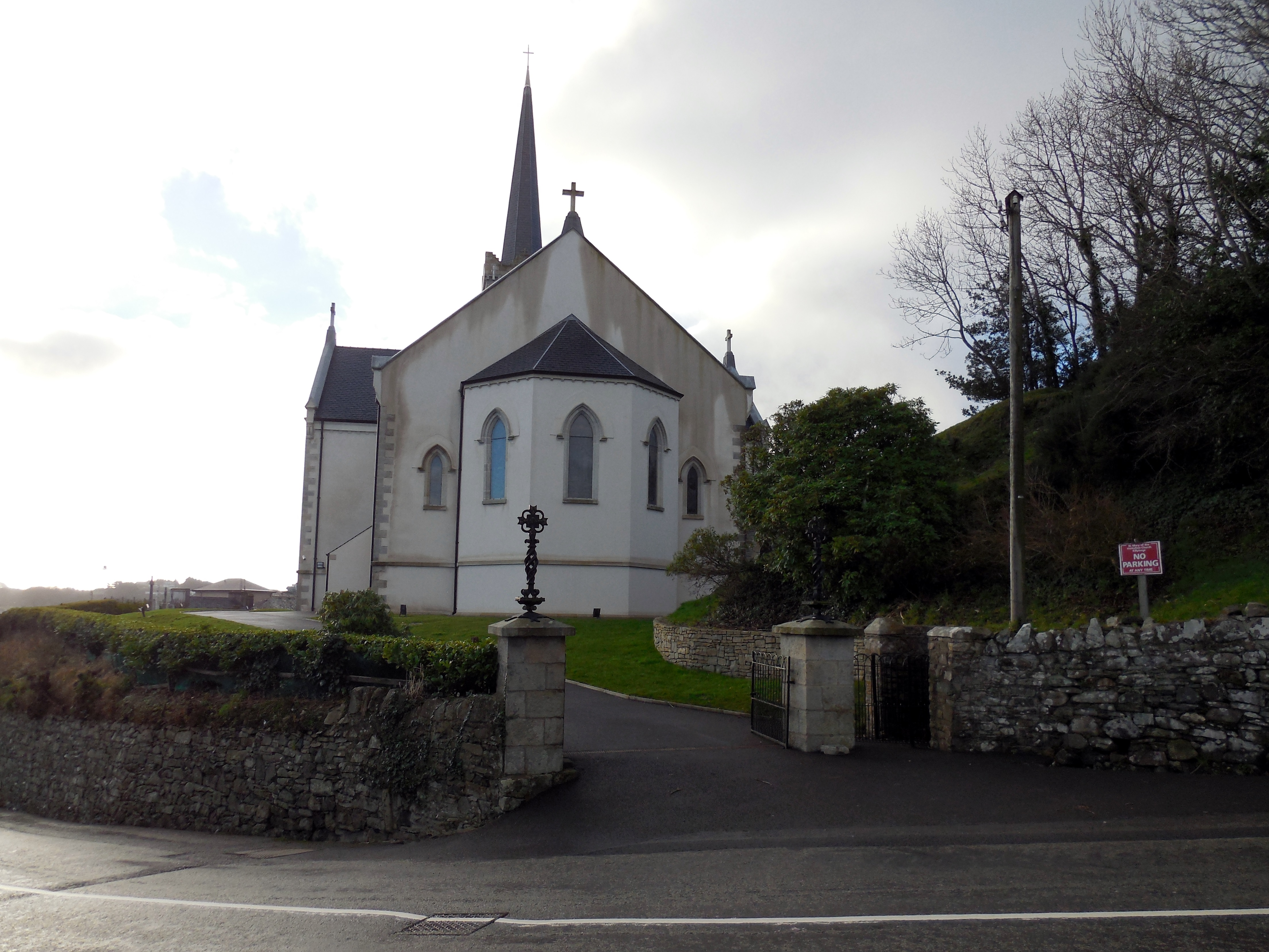

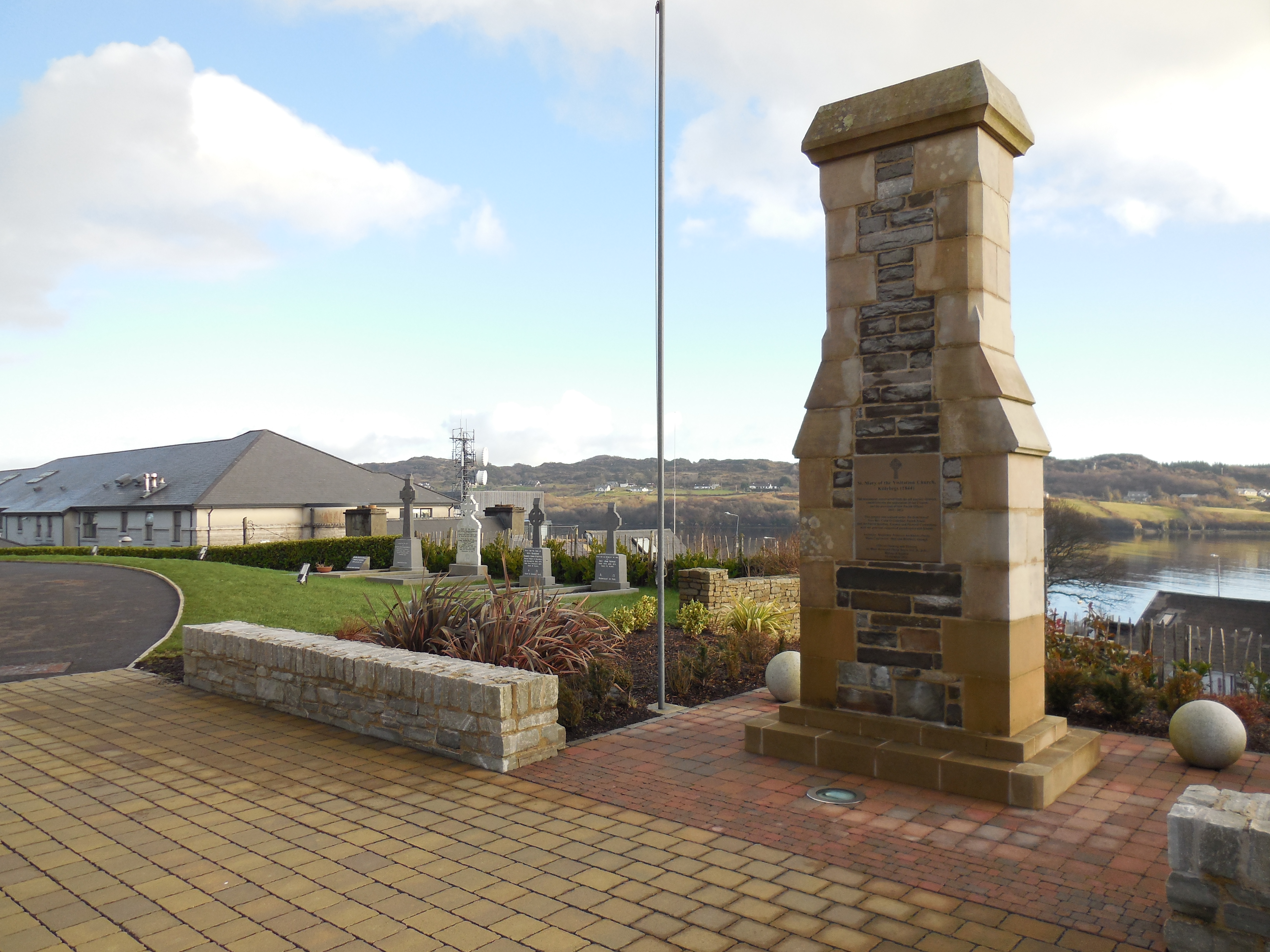

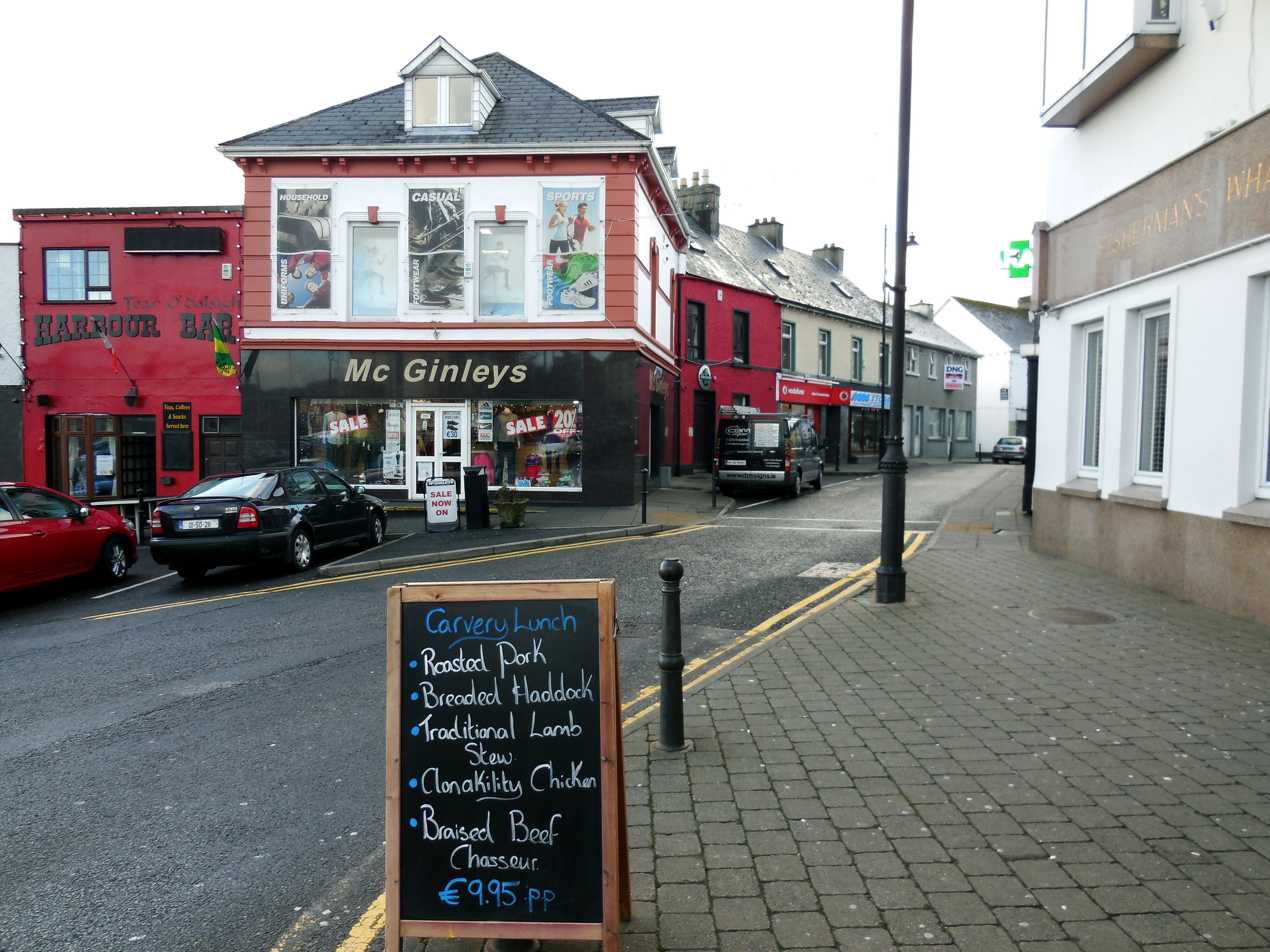

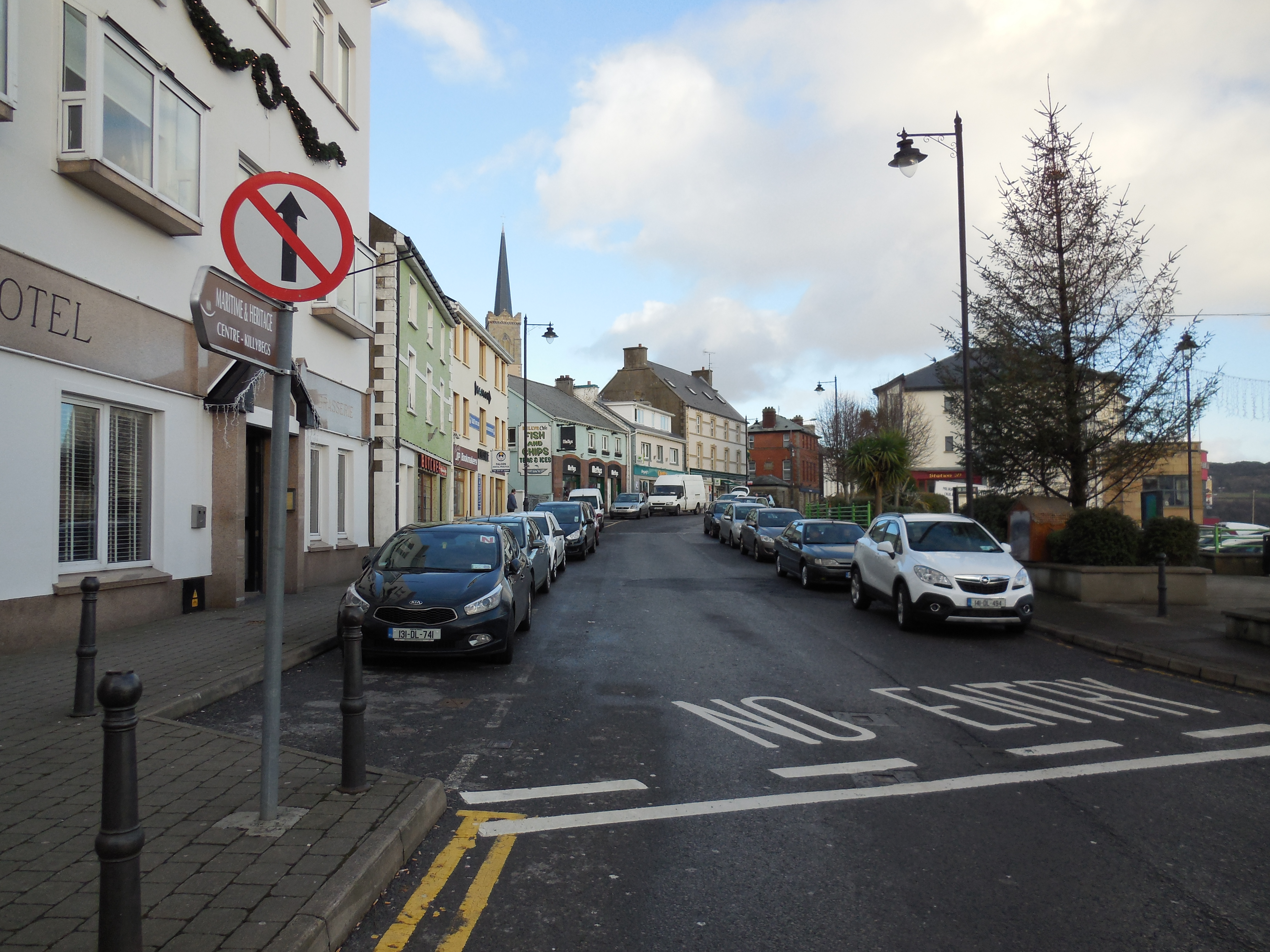

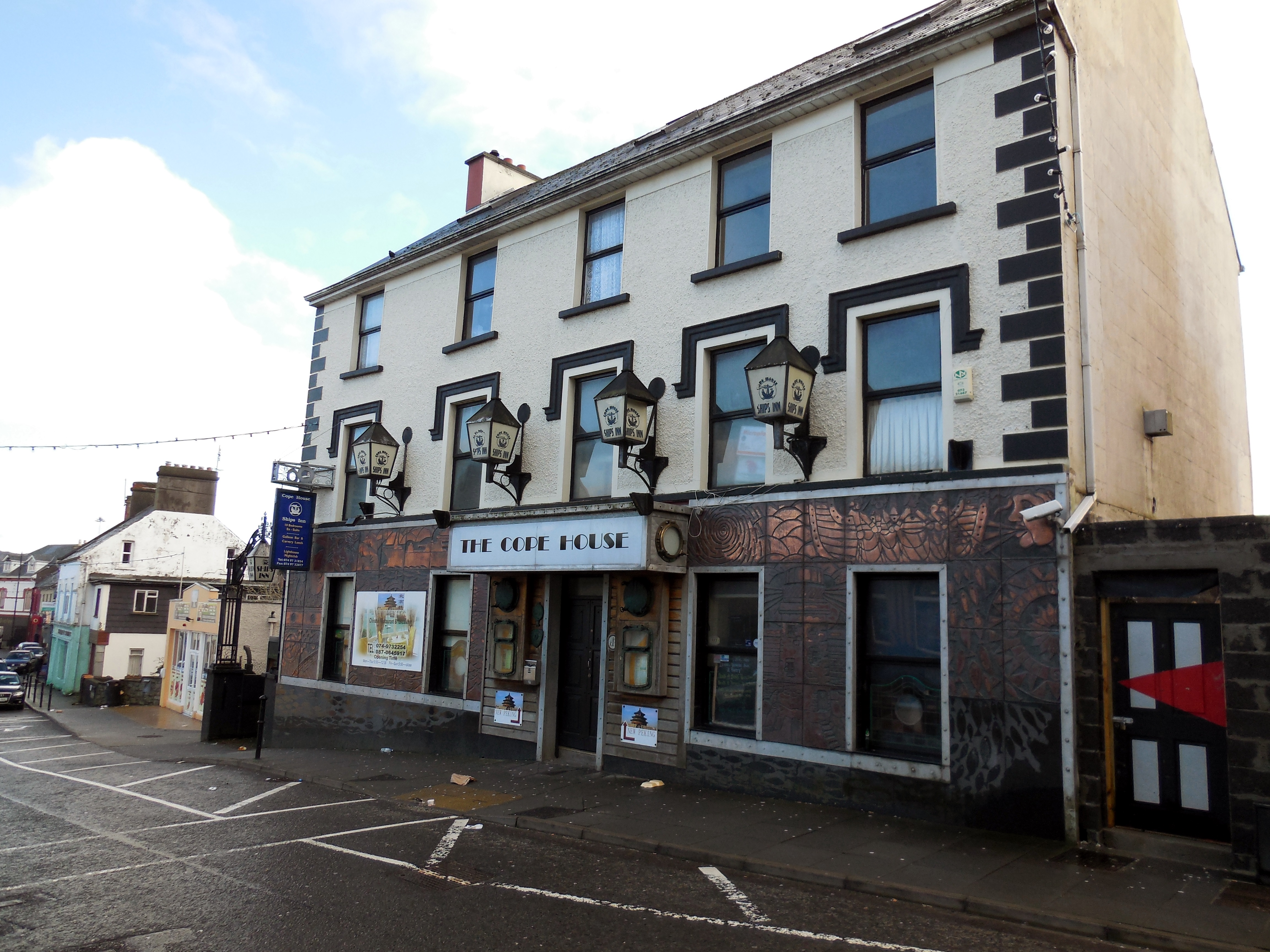

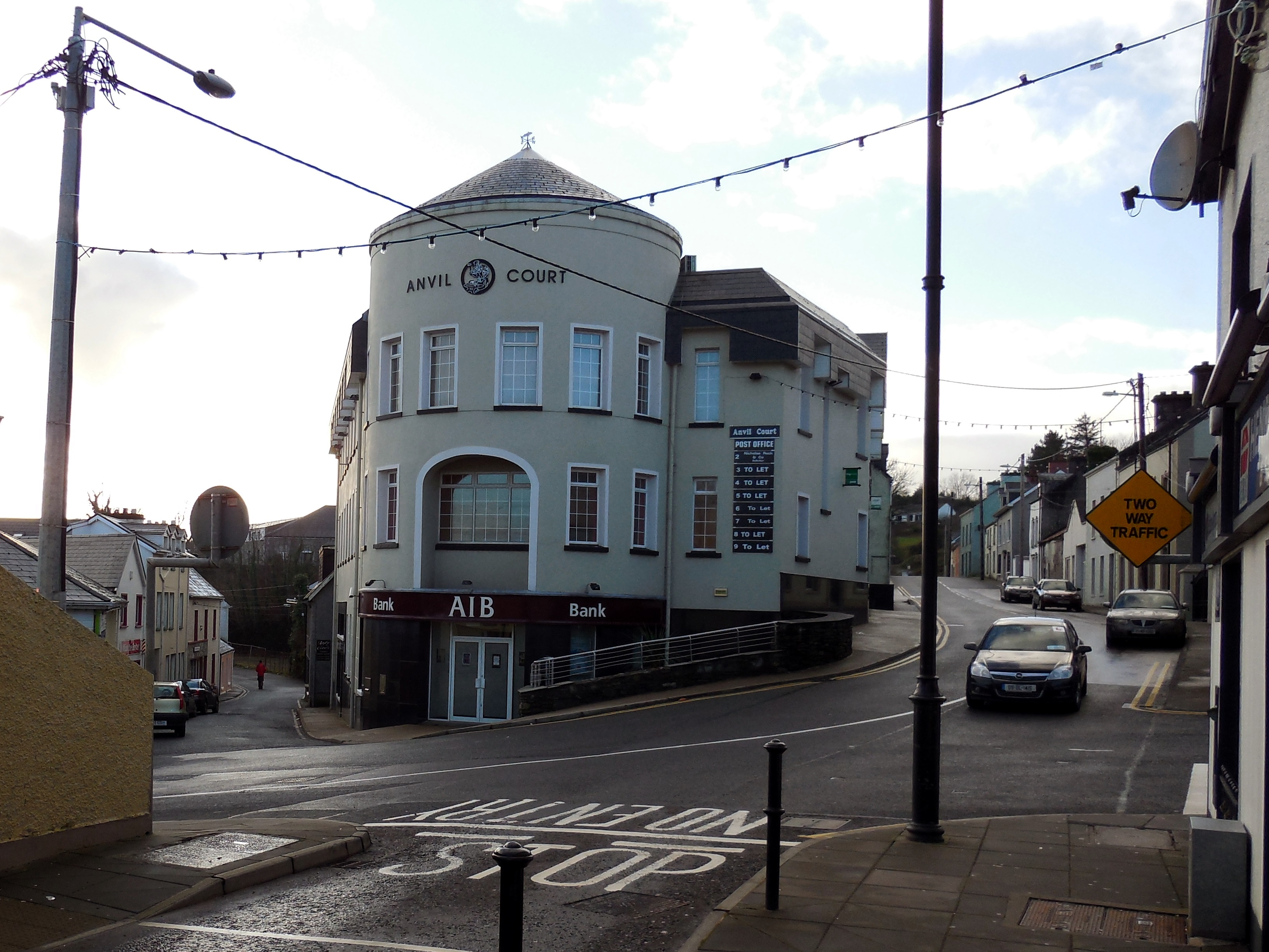

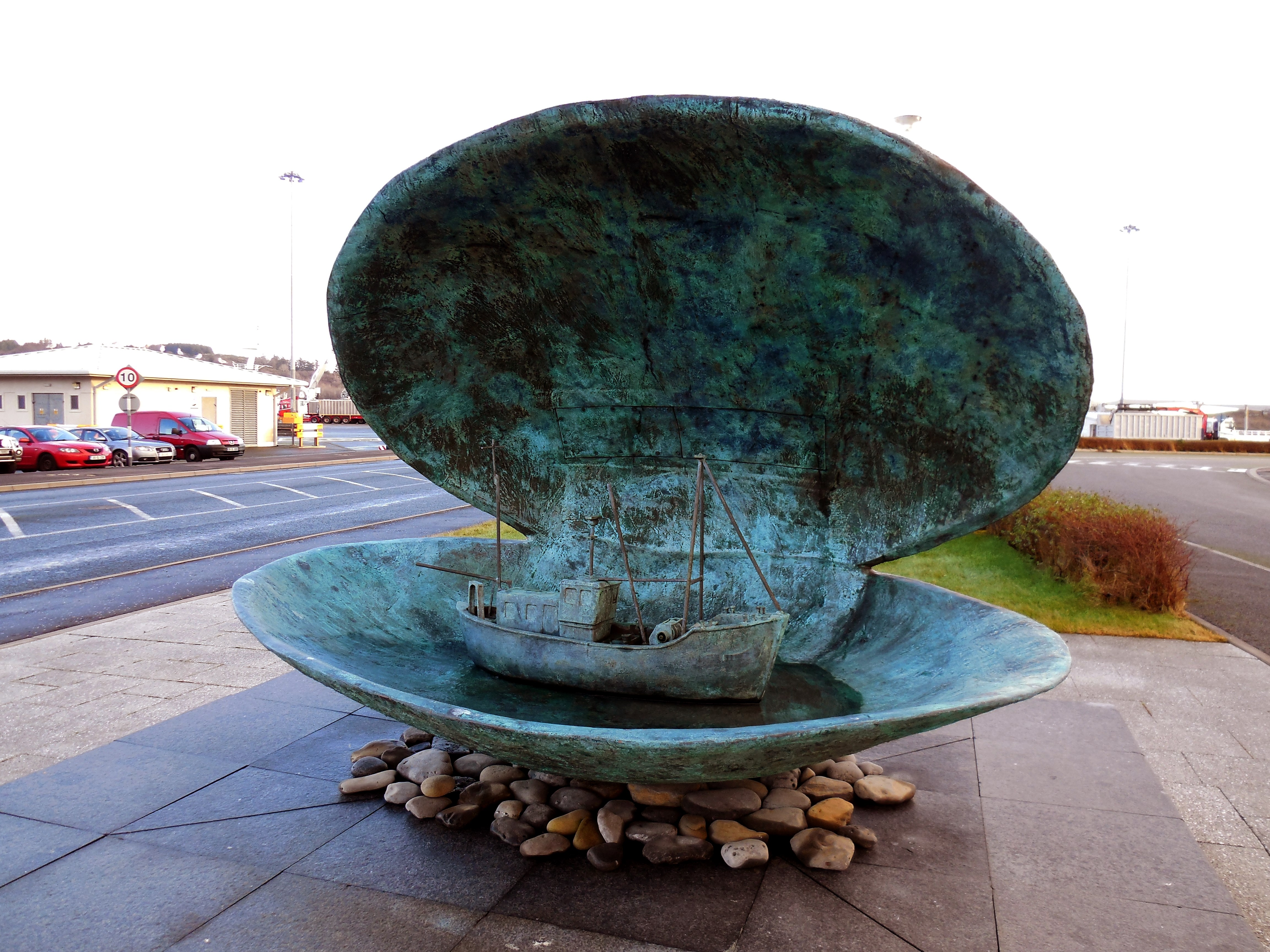

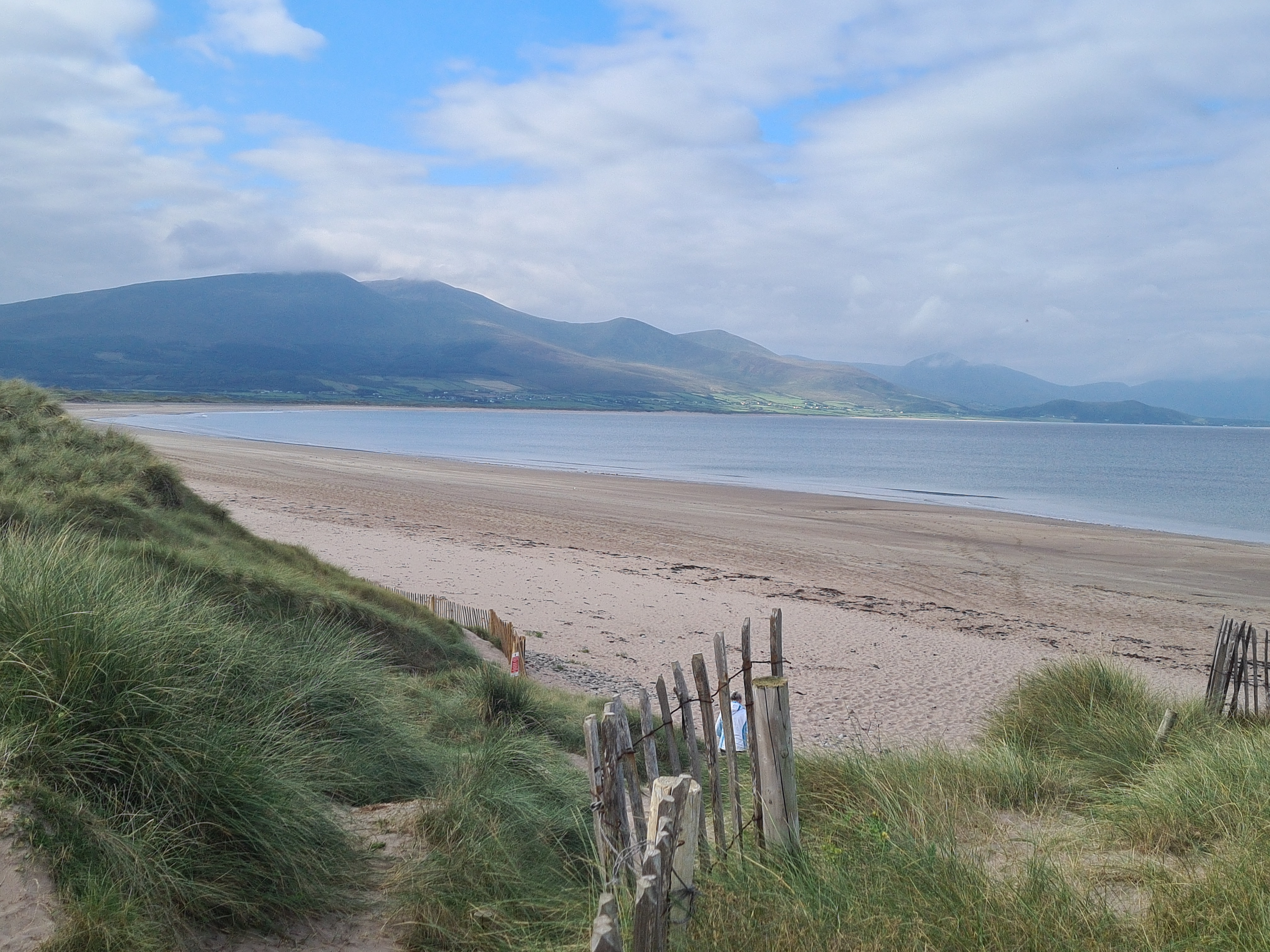

== See also ==
- List of populated places in the Republic of Ireland
- Largy Waterfall
