= Barry Cunningham =

Barry Cunningham may refer to:

- Barry Cunningham (politician), Australian politician
- Barry Cunningham (publisher), British publisher
- Barry Cunningham (Gaelic footballer), Irish Gaelic footballer
