= John Bán Gallagher =

Gaelic footballer

Sport
- Sport: Gaelic football
Club
- Years: Club
- 19??–?: Na Cealla Beaga
Inter-county
- Years: County
- 19??–19??: Donegal
- Ulster titles: 1

John Bán Gallagher is an Irish former Gaelic footballer who played for Na Cealla Beaga and the Donegal county team.

== Playing career ==
Bán Gallagher won the 1987 Ulster Under-21 Football Championship and the 1987 All-Ireland Under-21 Football Championship with Donegal.

He went on to play for the senior county team in both league and championship. He made a late substitute appearance for Brian Murray against Armagh in the 1990 Ulster Senior Football Championship final, won by Donegal. He kicked the winner in the 1995–96 National Football League semi-final against Cork at Croke Park; the victory meant Donegal played in that season's final.

When his club reached the final of the 1991 Ulster Senior Club Football Championship, he was injured ahead of the game.

== Personal life ==
Bán Gallagher's son Eoghan also played for Na Cealla Beaga and Donegal.

== Honours ==
Donegal

- Ulster Senior Football Championship: 1990
- All-Ireland Under-21 Football Championship: 1987
- Ulster Under-21 Football Championship: 1987
