= Tommy Ryan (Gaelic footballer) =

Irish Gaelic footballer (born 1967)

Tommy Ryan (born 1967) is an Irish former Gaelic footballer.

Born in Termon, County Donegal, he attended St Eunan's College. Termon has a small club, near Letterkenny, but had only been competing at junior level shortly before Ryan was picked for Donegal.

Ryan was part of the team that won the 1987 All-Ireland Under-21 Football Championship.

He made his championship debut against Armagh in 1988. He won an Ulster MFC in 1985, an Ulster and All-Ireland Under-21 in 1987, and an Ulster SFC and All-Ireland SFC in 1992. He returned from the U.S. in 1990 and played against Armagh in the 1990 Ulster Senior Football Championship final, won by Donegal, scoring 0–1 (and — seemingly — a first-half goal, ruled out when referee Damien Campbell pulled play back).

He was Donegal's top scorer in the 1992 Ulster SFC. He did not play in the All-Ireland final but started the semi-final win over Mayo at Croke Park on 16 August 1992. Ahead of the All-Ireland final, Ryan lost his place in the team to Manus Boyle, who gave a man of the match performance. The vote against Ryan's inclusion was tight (3–2). Ryan told the Sunday Independent in 2021 that he had "zero political clout. You had the county chairman Naul McCole (also a selector)… he was from Tony [Boyle]'s club and a neighbour of Declan [Bonner]'s… Seamus Bonner, one of the selectors, Seamus is from Donegal town which has Four Masters and Joyce McMullan is the only man on the team from that area… You had the two McHughs (Martin and James) in the half-forward line… the other position was between me and Manus… If there was going to be a switch there was only one way it was going to be accommodated and I was going to be the one to lose out and that was just it".

Ryan returned to the team in the National Football League several weeks later. He was not selected for the 1993 Ulster final, which Donegal lost to Derry. Manager Brian McEniff, according to Ryan, admitted his omission had been a mistake. His last competitive game for his county was in April 1995.

He won 2 Trench Cups with Sligo.

Upon retiring as a player, he remained active in football, managing Termon to the club's second county final. He, alongside Tony Boyle, was part of John Joe Doherty's backroom team when Doherty managed Donegal.

In 2011, he was fined for not having a license for his pub. In 2014, he was disqualified from driving for 4 years for not providing a breath test when gardaí stopped his car.
