= Tony McClenaghan =

Donegal Gaelic footballer

Sport
- Sport: Gaelic football
Clubs
- Years: Club
- 201?– c. 2015: Moville; Donegal Boston
Inter-county
- Years: County
- 201?–: Donegal

Tony McClenaghan is an Irish Gaelic footballer who plays for Moville and the Donegal county team.

== Playing career ==
McClenaghan has also played for Donegal Boston, winning the North-East Men's Senior Football Championship in 2015.

County senior manager Rory Gallagher called McClenaghan up ahead of the 2016 season as one of twelve new recruits, alongside such players as Eoghan Bán Gallagher and Stephen McMenamin.

He co-captained with Eoghan Bán Gallagher the Donegal team that won the 2017 Ulster Under-21 Football Championship final against Derry.

First featuring for his county at senior level under the management of Declan Bonner, McClenaghan scored a goal against Kerry in Killarney in the 37th minute of the opening fixture of the 2018 National Football League. He also started the next game against Galway. He started the next game away to Dublin. He also started the fourth and fifth games, against Kildare and Tyrone respectively. He was a late substitute in the sixth game against Monaghan.

McClenaghan started against Tipperary in the third fixture of the 2019 National Football League in Thurles.

McClenaghan struggled with a back injury and, after surgery, was recalled to the Donegal senior panel ahead of the 2020 Dr McKenna Cup.

== Honours ==
Donegal

- Ulster Under-21 Football Championship: 2017

Donegal Boston

- North-East Men's Senior Football Championship: 2015
