= 2010 Connacht Senior Football Championship =

Football championship

2010 Connacht SFC
Tournament details
- Year: 2010

Winners
- Champions: Roscommon

Runners-up
- Runners-up: Sligo

The 2010 Connacht Senior Football Championship was that year's installment of the annual Connacht Senior Football Championship held under the auspices of the Connacht GAA. It was won by Roscommon who defeated Sligo in the final. This was Roscommon's first Connacht senior title since 2001. They overcame London and Leitrim to get to the final. Donie Shine dominated the scoring in the final.

Sligo's progress to the final was considered a surprise. They overcame the province's traditional big two - Mayo in the quarter-final, then Galway in the semi-final with the aid of a replay - only for Roscommon to defeat them by a single point.

The winning Roscommon team received the J. J. Nestor Cup, and automatically advanced to the quarter-final stage of the 2010 All-Ireland Senior Football Championship. Sligo entered the All-Ireland Qualifiers but soon exited.

== Bracket ==
Quarter-finals
New York	0-12
Galway	2-13
Sligo	0-15
Mayo	1-8
London	0-6
Roscommon	0-14

Semi-finals
Galway	0-16
Sligo	1-14
Leitrim	0-11
Roscommon	1-13

Final
Sligo	0-13
Roscommon	0-14

== Quarter-finals ==
2 May 2010
Quarter-final

New York	0-12 – 2-13	Galway
D Doona 0-5, J Murtagh 0-4, B Reilly, A O'Connor, J Bell 0-1 each.	Report	P Joyce 1-6, N Joyce 0-4, C Bane 1-1, M Clancy, G Sice 0-1 each.

Gaelic Grounds, New York City
Referee: M. Condon (Waterford)
30 May 2010
Quarter-final

London	0-6 – 0-14	Roscommon
E O'Neill 0-2, P Geraghty, D Hayden, N Egan, E O'Cuiv 0-1 each.	Report	D Shine 0-9, G Heneghan 0-2, J Rogers, C Dineen, K Mannion 0-1 each.

Ruislip, London
Referee: C. Reilly (Meath)
5 June 2010
Quarter Final

Sligo	0-15 – 1-8	Mayo
C McGee 0-4, M Breheny, D Kelly 0-3 each, A Costello 0-2, J Davey, T Taylor, S Gilmartin 0-1 each.	Report	A Freeman 1-4, C Mortimer 0-3, A Moran 0-1.

Markievicz Park, Sligo
Referee: Jimmy White (Donegal)

== Semi-finals ==
20 June 2010
Semi Final

Roscommon	1-13 - 0-11	Leitrim
D Shine 1-8, C Cregg 0-2, G Heneghan, K Mannion, D Casey 0-1 each	Report	M Foley 0-8, J Glancy 0-2, D O'Connor 0-1

Dr Hyde Park, Roscommon
Referee: Joe McQuillan (Cavan)
27 June 2010
Semi Final

Galway	1-10 - 1-10	Sligo
P Joyce 0-6, E Concannon 1-1, J Bergin, G Sice, G Bradshaw 0-1 each	Report	D Kelly 1-3, C McGee 0-3, A Costello, M Breheny, T Taylor, K Cawley 0-1 each

Pearse Stadium, Salthill
Attendance: 12,829
Referee: David Coldrick (Meath)
3 July 2010
Semi Final Replay

Sligo	1-14 - 0-16	Galway
D Kelly 1-2, M Breheny 0-4, A Marren 0-3, C McGee 0-2, K Cawley, A Costello, K Sweeney 0-1 each	Report	P Joyce 0-5, S Armstrong 0-4, M Clancy 0-2, G O'Donnell, J Bergin, M Meehan, E Concannon, P Conroy 0-1 each

Markievicz Park, Sligo
Referee: Maurice Deegan (Laois)

== Final ==
18 July 2010
Final

Sligo	0-13 - 0-14	Roscommon
A Costello 0-5, A Marren 0-3, M Breheny 0-2, C McGee, C Harrison, S Davey 0-1 each	Report	D Shine 0-10, D Casey, C Cregg, D Keenan, D O'Gara 0-1 each

McHale Park, Castlebar
Referee: Jimmy White (Donegal)
