= James Ruane =

Irish Gaelic footballer

Sport
- Sport: Gaelic football
Inter-county
- Years: County
- 199?–200?: Donegal

James Ruane is an Irish former Gaelic footballer who played for the Donegal county team.

Ruane won an Ulster Under-21 Football Championship with Donegal in 1995.

P. J. McGowan was the manager to introduce Ruane to the Donegal senior team.

He made a substitute appearance in the first game of Brian McEniff's last spell as Donegal manager, a league defeat to Galway in Tuam in February 2003. However, an ankle injury caused Ruane to miss the 2003 All-Ireland Senior Football Championship semi-final against Armagh.

Ruane also played for Donegal Boston.
