= Letterkenny RFC =

Irish rugby union club, based in Letterkenny, Co. Donegal

(Ireland) Letterkenny RFC
- Full name: Letterkenny Rugby Football Club
- Unions: IRFU
- Founded: 1973; 53 years ago
- Ground(s): The Glebe, Letterkenny, County Donegal, Ireland (Capacity: 500)
- Chairman: Andrew Stewart
- League: Kukri Qualifying League 3
Team kit	2nd kit

Letterkenny RFC is a rugby union club based in County Donegal, Ireland. The club has strong ties with Dave Gallaher, the New Zealand rugby union footballer, best known as the captain of "The Originals". Gallaher is mentioned on the team crest, and the team plays its home games at Dave Gallaher Memorial Park in Letterkenny. It has seen success in producing quality players in recent years including Joe Dunleavy and Conor McMenamin who both have represented Ulster and Ireland in their according age groups

== History ==
The club was founded when the town's rugby players, who were travelling to Derry and Limavady for games each week, decided to form their own club. A team was entered into the Ulster league and initial games were played at Robinson's Field on Letterkenny's Port Road. The following year the club purchased 4 acres (16,000 m^{2}) of land at Drumnahoagh near the Dry Arch Roundabout, not far from the town centre. In an ambitious move a club house and changing rooms were constructed. The club flourished for the next decade with a vibrant social scene and successfully ran three teams for many of those years. The club then opted a move to the Silver Tassie between Letterkenny and Ramelton and prepared new pitches to take the club to the next level and provide more space. In 1985 the club continued to flourish when the team won the Forester Cup in Ravenhill.

Unfortunately the ownership of the Tassie passed out of club hands and the club underwent a period of decline. The third team failed to field from 1992 and for a while local interest in rugby waned. It was now very clear that the playing surfaces at the fields of Halfway Line were inadequate for rugby especially during the winter months.

== 21st-century ==
The club returned to Letterkenny in 1999 to lands bought at the Glebe and usage of Moore's field next to it. This move improved playing surfaces and made the club more accessible to the large population of Letterkenny. The club was promoted during the seasons of 2004, 2005, 2006. Many members of the first team are now home grown players from Donegal. Letterkenny won the Gordon West Cup in 2011 for the first time in their history after their fifth time in the final.

Late 2012 saw the opening of the new clubhouse and 2013 brought the 40th anniversary of the club.

Letterkenny Rugby Club hosted an Ulster Rugby open training day in July 2018, with Irish captain Rory Best among those present, and also Jacob Stockdale, Iain Henderson and Stuart McCloskey.

== Youth rugby ==
Letterkenny has been at the forefront of developing an outlet for rugby in the north-west over the last two decades. It has provided the county with the first underage rugby team, and also was the first rugby team in Donegal to win their section in the Ulster league in 2003, when the U-18's won Section C. The club has expanded its management and playing members dramatically over the years. Letterkenny RFC now fields and trains teams from U-6's up to senior level, including Ladies which has mirrored the successes of the Irish international team to date. Although many of the underage players filter through to the 1st and 2nd XV, Letterkenny has also provided a much needed wealth of experience for those travelling to senior clubs across the country as players move on to university and beyond.

== Notable players ==
- Marty Carlin — played in a Forster Cup final victory at Ravenhill in 1987
- Charlie Mulgrew — played in a Forster Cup final victory at Ravenhill in 1987

== See also ==
- Rugby union in Ireland
- Irish Rugby Football Union (IRFU)
