= Charlie Mulgrew (Gaelic footballer) =

Irish Gaelic footballer and manager

Personal information
- Native name: Cathal Ó Maolchraoibhe (Irish)
- Born: 1960s County Donegal, Ireland

Sport
- Sport: Gaelic football
Club
- Years: Club
- ?–?: St Eunan's
Inter-county
- Years: County
- 1981–1992: Donegal
Inter-county titles
- Ulster titles: 3
- All-Irelands: 1
- All Stars: 0

Charlie Mulgrew (born 1960s) is an Irish Gaelic football manager and former player from County Donegal.

== Playing ==
Mulgrew played for his school team, St Eunan's College. He repeated his Leaving Certificate at the College in 1978-79, playing for the team that won a MacLarnon Cup and All-Ireland B Final (Donegal's first ever title at All-Ireland level). He played his club football for St Eunan's. He won the 1982 All-Ireland Under-21 Football Championship with the Donegal county team. He played for the Donegal senior team between 1981 and 1992, winning the Sam Maguire Cup that year, as well as Ulster Senior Football Championship titles in 1983, 1990 and 1992. He sustained a broken jaw in the 1983 Ulster semi-final defeat of Monaghan. Along with Marty Carlin, Mulgrew was dropped from Tom Conaghan's county team for one year after they played for Letterkenny in a Forster Cup final victory at Ravenhill in 1987.

== Coaching ==
After retiring from playing Mulgrew continued his involvement in the game as a manager. He led St Eunan's to several senior county titles and was part of Declan Bonner's backroom team during Bonner's first spell as Donegal manager in the 1990s.

In 2004, Mulgrew was appointed manager of the Fermanagh senior team, and in his first season in charge he led them to the All-Ireland semi-final for the first time in their history. In 2006, he led them to Round 4 of the All-Ireland Qualifiers but Fermanagh were no match for Mulgrew's native Donegal. He left the Fermanagh job in 2007, following a narrow All-Ireland qualifier defeat to Meath, saying "I've been dreading the prospect of this [leaving the job] because I bonded so well with this group of lads. But I always made clear that this was going to be my final year".

Mulgrew was interviewed for the role of Donegal senior manager in 2007 following Brian McIver's resignation, though McIver was reappointed after reapplying when he decided to carry on. Mulgrew then became involved in a public feud with former Donegal teammate John Joe Doherty, concerning the Donegal managerial job when it became available again in 2008. Speaking on local radio on 24 October 2008, Mulgrew said: "To be classified as a former team-mate by that guy -- as far as I'm concerned, I'm not a former team-mate (of his)." Mulgrew had on this occasion been seeking a joint managerial position with the senior footballers alongside Declan Bonner but both ultimately lost out to Doherty.

== Honours ==
=== Player ===
- All-Ireland Senior Football Championship: 1992
- Ulster Senior Football Championship: 1983, 1990, 1992
- All-Ireland Under-21 Football Championship: 1982
- Ulster Under-21 Football Championship: 1982

=== Manager ===
- All-Ireland Senior Football Championship semi-finalist: 2004
- Ulster GAA Writers Personality of the Year: 2004
- Donegal Senior Football Championship: ?
