= P. J. McGowan =

Irish Gaelic football manager and administrator

P. J. McGowan (born 1951/52) is an Irish Gaelic football manager and administrator. He succeeded Brian McEniff as Donegal manager in 1994 and lasted until 1997, thus preceding Declan Bonner's first spell in charge. He also managed Fermanagh.

== Career ==
McGowan is from Ballybofey. His club is Seán Mac Cumhaills. He first became involved in football when he was ten years of age.

McGowan managed Donegal to the 1987 All-Ireland Under-21 Football Championship. In the early 1990s, he spent a short time as senior manager of Fermanagh.

McGowan took over as Donegal's senior manager in the wake of the club's success in the 1992 All-Ireland Senior Football Championship Final, at a time when players such as Anthony Molloy and Martin McHugh had retired. He managed Donegal to the finals of the 1994–95 and 1995–96 National Football Leagues. In between he managed Donegal to an Ulster Senior Football Championship victory over reigning All-Ireland champions Down in 1995, a game which took place one week after the first league final loss. They then lost to Monaghan in a game he described as the lowest point of his time as manager.

His last championship game in charge was a heavy defeat to Cavan, managed by McHugh. McGowan announced his departure as Donegal manager in 1997, The Irish Times reporting: "His statement was equivocal — saying that he would not oppose anyone who wanted to take over the position - but he admits it amounts to a resignation", though McGowan told the newspaper: "I'd have taken it on if no-one else was willing… I don't have a divine right to this job". Among the players he introduced during his time as manager were Damian Diver, Peter McGinley, James Ruane and Brian Roper.

McGowan was later part of the backroom team of Brian McEniff when he returned as manager.

McGowan has been an administrator on the Ulster Council. As vice-chairman of the county board, he was part of the selection committee tasked with choosing a new senior football manager in 2008. He completed five years as Donegal County Chairman in December 2012.

He managed Aodh Ruadh in 2006.

Sporting positions
Preceded by Brian McEniff	Donegal Senior Football Manager; 1994–1997	Succeeded by Declan Bonner
