= 1994–95 National Football League (Ireland) =

Gaelic football competition

League details
- Dates: October 1994 – 14 May 1995
- Teams: 33

League champions
- Winners: Derry (3rd win)
- Captain: Tony Scullion
- Manager: Mickey Moran

League runners-up
- Runners-up: Donegal
- Manager: P. J. McGowan

Other division winners
- Division 2: Clare
- Division 3: Cavan
- Division 4: Monaghan

The 1994–95 National Football League, known for sponsorship reasons as the Church & General National Football League, was the 64th staging of the National Football League (NFL), an annual Gaelic football tournament for the Gaelic Athletic Association county teams of Ireland.

The tournament introduced two experimental rules: consecutive handpasses were banned, and players had to stay 10 m (11 yd) from the free-kick taker. This later evolved into the current 13 m (14 yd) exclusion zone. Derry defeated Donegal in the final.

== Format ==
The teams are in four divisions, three of 8 teams and one of 9. Each team plays all the other teams in its division once: either home or away. Teams earn 2 points for a win and 1 for a draw. The top two teams in Divisions 2, 3 and 4 are promoted, while the bottom two teams in Divisions 1, 2 and 3 are relegated.

Eight teams contest the NFL quarter-finals:

- The top 4 teams in Division 1
- The top 2 teams in Division 2
- The first-placed team in Division 3
- The first-placed team in Division 4

== Results and tables ==
=== Division One ===
==== Play-Offs ====
26 March 1995 For 3rd Place	Kerry	1-10 — 1-8	Donegal	Tuam

2 April 1995 For 4th Place	Donegal	1-16 — 0-11	Kildare	Clones

==== Table ====
Team	Pld	W	D	L	Pts	Status
Laois	7	5	0	2	10	Advance to quarter-finals
Derry	7	4	1	2	9	Advance to quarter-finals
Kerry	7	4	0	3	8	Advance to quarter-finals
Donegal	7	4	0	3	8	Advance to quarter-finals
Kildare	7	4	0	3	8
Meath	7	3	0	4	6
Dublin	7	2	1	4	5	Relegated to Division Two of the 1995–96 NFL
Down	7	1	0	6	2	Relegated to Division Two of the 1995–96 NFL

=== Division two ===
==== Play-Offs ====
2 April 1995 For 2nd Place	Tyrone	1-10 — 0-9	Louth	Clones

==== Table ====
Team	Pld	W	D	L	Pts	Status
Clare	7	5	1	1	11	Promoted to Division One of the 1995–96 NFL and advance to quarter-finals
Tyrone	7	5	0	2	10	Promoted to Division One of the 1995–96 NFL and advance to quarter-finals
Louth	7	5	0	2	10
Cork	7	3	2	2	8
Leitrim	7	3	1	3	7
Armagh	7	2	2	3	6
Galway	7	1	1	5	3	Relegated to Division Three of the 1995–96 NFL
Mayo	7	0	1	6	1	Relegated to Division Three of the 1995–96 NFL

=== Division 3 ===
Team	Pld	W	D	L	Pts	Status
Cavan	7	6	0	1	12	Promoted to Division Two of the 1995–96 NFL and advance to quarter-finals
Westmeath	7	5	1	1	11	Promoted to Division Two of the 1995–96 NFL
Roscommon	7	5	0	2	10
Wexford	7	3	1	3	7
Fermanagh	7	3	0	4	6
Antrim	7	3	0	4	6
Longford	7	1	2	4	4	Relegated to Division Four of the 1995–96 NFL
Tipperary	7	0	0	7	0	Relegated to Division Four of the 1995–96 NFL

=== Division 4 ===
Team	Pld	W	D	L	Pts	Status
Monaghan	8	7	0	1	14	Promoted to Division Three of the 1995–96 NFL and advance to quarter-finals
Sligo	8	6	1	1	13	Promoted to Division Three of the 1995–96 NFL
Wicklow	8	6	0	2	12
Offaly	8	5	0	3	10
Carlow	8	4	1	3	9
Waterford	8	3	0	5	6
Kilkenny	8	1	1	6	3
Limerick	8	1	1	6	3
London	8	0	2	6	2

== Knockout stage ==
=== Quarter-finals ===
16 April 1995

Derry	1-11 – 0-11	Cavan

Athletic Grounds, Armagh

16 April 1995

Laois	2-8 – 1-6	Monaghan

Croke Park
Attendance: 14,606

16 April 1995

Tyrone	3-7 – 0-7	Kerry

Croke Park
Attendance: 14,606

16 April 1995

Donegal	2-11 – 3-7	Clare

MacHale Park, Castlebar

=== Semi-finals ===
30 April 1995

Donegal	1-14 – 2-8	Laois

Croke Park
Attendance: 28,417

30 April 1995

Derry	1-8 – 2-3	Tyrone

Croke Park
Attendance: 28,417

=== Final ===
14 May 1995

Derry	0-12 – 0-8	Donegal

Croke Park, Dublin
Attendance: 28,392
Referee: Paddy Russell (Tipperary)
