= St Catherine's F.C. =

St Catherine's
- Full name: St Catherine's Football Club
- Nickname: The Saints
- Founded: 1896; 130 years ago
- Ground: Emerald Park
- League: Brian McCormick Sports Premier Division

St Catherine's Football Club is an association football club based in Killybegs, County Donegal, Ireland.

The team play in the Brian McCormick Sports Premier Division, the first tier of the Donegal Junior League.

Their most famous former player is Séamus Coleman, who went on to play for League of Ireland side Sligo Rovers, transferred to English Premier League side Everton and took over as captain of the Republic of Ireland national football team during the UEFA Euro 2016 final tournament in France.

== Notable players ==
- Manus Boyle — as a Gaelic footballer won the 1992 All-Ireland Senior Football Championship
- Séamus Coleman — captain of Premier League side Everton and the senior Republic of Ireland team
- Aaron Doherty — Gaelic footballer for Donegal
- Patrick McBrearty — as a Gaelic footballer won the 2012 All-Ireland Senior Football Championship
- Paddy McClafferty — represented Gibraltar in international association football.
- Hugh McFadden — unused substitute as a Gaelic footballer during the 2014 All-Ireland Senior Football Championship Final
- Barry McGowan — as a Gaelic footballer won the 1992 All-Ireland Senior Football Championship
- Ryan McHugh — played as a Gaelic footballer in the 2014 All-Ireland Senior Football Championship Final
