= Noelle Vial =

Irish poet (1959–2003)

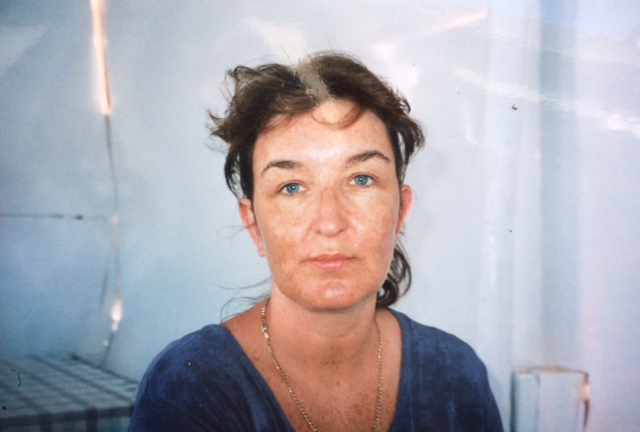
- Born: Noelle Sharkey; 25 December 1959; Killybegs, Ireland
- Died: 19 January 2003 (aged 43); Killybegs, Ireland
- Resting place: Killybegs, Ireland
- Occupation: Poet
- Spouse: Charlie Vial
- Writing career
- Language: English
- Notable work: Promiscuous Winds
- Notable awards: Hennessy Literary award

Noelle Vial (25 December 1959 – 19 January 2003) was an Irish poet from County Donegal, Ireland. She was the recipient of the Hennessy Literary Award for best emerging poet in 1994. Her debut poetry collection, Promiscuous Winds, was published in 1995.

== Early life ==
Noelle Sharkey was born on 25 December 1959 in Killybegs, County Donegal, Ireland. Noelle was the recipient of a Pushkin prize for poetry in 1996. The Pushkin Prizes were established in 1987 by Sacha Hamilton, Duchess of Abercorn, to commemorate the 150th anniversary of the death of her ancestor, Alexander Pushkin. The poetry prize was awarded annually to school aged children.

== Career ==
Vial wrote poetry and taught creative writing at St Catherine's Vocational School. She was a founding member of the Killybegs writers group. Her first poetry collection, Promiscuous Winds was published in the United States in 1995 by Story Line Press. Vial was the recipient of the Hennessy Literary Award for best emerging poet in 1994.

Vial died at her home on 19 January 2003. A number of poems were found among her papers after her death; Vial had been under contract for a new collection of poetry to be published in the U.S. Fourteen years later, the book of poems, The Ungrateful Princess, edited by writer, Liam McGinley, and Vial's son, Derek Vial, was published in 2017.

In 2013, The Donegal Bay and Blue Stacks Festival, supported by The Arts Council and Creative Ireland, established an annual poetry bursary for emerging poets in memory of Vial. The bursary, named the Noelle Vial Tyrone Guthrie Centre Poetry Bursary, provides a week-long stay at the Tyrone Guthrie Centre at Newbliss, County Monaghan

== Selected publications ==
- Vial, Noelle (1995). Promiscuous Winds. Story Line Press. ISBN 978-1885266132.
- Vial, Noelle (2017). The Ungrateful Princess. Five Points Press. ISBN 978-1527210264.
