= Damian Diver =

Irish Gaelic footballer

Personal information
- Born: 1973/4
- Occupations: Quantity surveyor Centra owner and retail manager

Sport
- Sport: Gaelic football
- Position: Half-back
Club
- Years: Club
- 19??–: Ard an Rátha
Club titles
- Donegal titles: 2
College
- Years: College
- c. 1990s: DIT
College titles
- Sigerson titles: 0
Inter-county
Years	County	Apps (scores)
1995–2006	Donegal	120
Inter-county titles
- Ulster titles: 0
- All-Irelands: 0
- NFL: 0
- All Stars: 0

Damian (Note: Occasionally misspelt in some coverage as "Damien". He spells it as Damian on his Twitter.) Diver (born 1973/4) is an Irish former Gaelic footballer who played for Ard an Rátha and the Donegal county team.

He played at half-back for his county. He made 120 appearances, 36 of which were championship, for the team between 1995 and 2006. He was noted for owning his own gym equipment in a time before this was commonplace.

== Playing career ==
=== Club and college ===
Diver twice won the Donegal Senior Football Championship with his club. He took a free that led to the goal scored during the 2004 final.

He was also captain of DIT during their 1995 cup-winning season, but missed the final with influenza.

=== Inter-county ===
Diver first featured on the county panel in 1994. P. J. McGowan was the manager to introduce Diver to the Donegal senior team. He made his debut in an away game to Meath in Navan in the 1994–95 National Football League, during which he marked Colm Coyle and Trevor Giles. Based in Dublin as a student with DIT while training to become a quantity surveyor at the time, Diver did not expect to play and was thus not monitoring his diet. He travelled west from Dublin to meet the team. Diver said later: "I was stuffing myself with grub. I'll never forget it, P. J. McGowan came up to me after and says 'you're starting wing-back today'. Well holy Christ, the colour must've gone out of my face".

Diver made his senior championship debut for Donegal against Down in 1996. He played in the 1998 Ulster Senior Football Championship final. He started Mickey Moran's first game in charge of Donegal, a league win at home to Offaly in October 2000.

Diver made an appearance as a first-half substitute against Armagh in the 2002 Ulster SFC final. He then played against Dublin in the 2002 All-Ireland Senior Football Championship (in which Donegal earned a replay), but Diver returned home on the bus with only three teammates. He started the first game of Brian McEniff's last spell as Donegal manager, a league defeat to Galway in Tuam in February 2003. He played in an All-Ireland SFC semi-final later that year. He played in the 2004 Ulster SFC final, after Donegal defeated All-Ireland champions Tyrone in the semi-final. He also made a substitute appearance in the 2006 Ulster SFC final against Armagh in Croke Park, in what proved to be his last game as a county player. According to Declan Bonner, Diver famously never won anything with Donegal (i.e. seniors). He announced his retirement from inter-county football in November 2006. Donegal won the National Football League less than six months later.

Never an All Star, Diver was, however, selected as a replacement All Star (2003 vintage) ahead of an exhibition game in 2005 due to Tom Kelly breaking his collarbone.

== Coaching career ==
Upon being appointed Donegal manager in 2010, Jim McGuinness appointed Diver as a defensive and strength and conditioning coach. However, Diver was unable to commit and missed out on winning Ulster SFC titles in 2011 and 2012, as well as the 2012 All-Ireland Senior Football Championship.

In September 2013, McGuinness parted ways with his backroom team. Diver said he would not take a position. However, shortly afterwards, McGuinness announced him as part of his new backroom team. Diver was a selector when Donegal reached the 2014 All-Ireland Senior Football Championship Final.

When McGuinness departed after this game, Diver was linked with the managerial vacancy.

In 2017, Diver was coaching under-10s with his club.

== Honours ==
=== County ===
- Ulster Senior Football Championship runner-up: 1998, 2002 2004, 2006
- All-Ireland Senior Football Championship runner-up: 2014 (selector)

=== Club ===
- Donegal Senior Football Championship: 2000?, 2004?
