= Matthew Smyth =

Irish Gaelic footballer

Sport
- Sport: Gaelic football
Clubs
- Years: Club
- 20?– c. 2015: Na Cealla Beaga; Donegal Boston
Inter-county
- Years: County
- 2013: Donegal

Matthew Smyth is an Irish Gaelic footballer who plays with Na Cealla Beaga and also, formerly, for the Donegal county team.

Smyth made his senior debut for Donegal in the 2013 National Football League game against Kerry, an easy win in Ballybofey.

In April 2013, he injured his neck while playing in a league match against St Michael's.

He also played for Donegal Boston, winning the North-East Men's Senior Football Championship in 2015.
