= Jason Noctor =

Gaelic footballer

Jason Noctor is a Gaelic footballer who played with Donegal as a defender. Jim McGuinness brought Noctor into the senior team in 2011. He played in games, including against Derry and Antrim, in a year when Donegal won a first Ulster Title in 19 years. He also played in Donegal Senior Football Championship Finals in 2010 and 2013.
