= Hugh McFadden (Gaelic footballer) =

Donegal Gaelic footballer (born 1994)

Personal information
- Native name: Aodh Mac Pháidín (Irish)
- Born: 25 January 1994 (age 32) Letterkenny, Ireland
- Occupation: Primary school teacher
- Height: 1.88 m (6 ft 2 in)

Sport
- Sport: Gaelic football
- Position: Midfield/Full-forward
Club
- Years: Club
- 2011–: Na Cealla Beaga
Inter-county
Years	County	Apps (scores)
2014–	Donegal	100+
Inter-county titles
- Ulster titles: 4

Hugh McFadden (born 25 January 1994) is an Irish Gaelic footballer who plays for Na Cealla Beaga and the Donegal county team. He can operate at midfield or full-forward.

McFadden served as Donegal's vice-captain during Michael Murphy's later career, when Murphy was absent. As a youth, McFadden played association football.

== Early life ==
McFadden played association football for St Catherine's. At the age of "16 or 17" he signed for League of Ireland team Finn Harps. He then signed a one-year scholarship with another League of Ireland team, Sligo Rovers, Rovers having won the 2012 League of Ireland Premier Division. According to McFadden, there was interest in him from other League of Ireland clubs too. But interest in Gaelic football was on the rise in his native county following the victorious 2012 All-Ireland Senior Football Championship Final. Donegal under-21 manager Maxi Curran called McFadden, who expressed an interest in joining, and senior manager Jim McGuinness called upon him around three months afterwards. "There are no regrets there. The way Gaelic football has taken off in Donegal — I wanted to be involved", McFadden said in 2015.

== Playing career ==
=== Club ===
McFadden reached the final of the 2013 Donegal Senior Football Championship with his club. Despite McFadden scoring a goal and pointing three frees, they lost to Glenswilly.

=== Inter-county ===
McFadden's performances for his club in that 2013 championship run drew the attention of county manager Jim McGuinness. In September 2013, McGuinness called McFadden into the senior inter-county team for winter training after McFadden scored 2–4 for his club in their 2013 Donegal Senior Football Championship quarter-final defeat of Sean Mac Cumhaills. The 2014 season was his first on the county panel. He appeared as a substitute in the 2014 National Football League. McFadden also played in the under-21 team that lost to Cavan in the 2014 Ulster final. He remained as a panel member for the championship campaign, as Donegal won the 2014 Ulster Senior Football Championship and advanced to the 2014 All-Ireland Senior Football Championship Final. He did not play in the final.

Following his appearance on the bench for 2014 All-Ireland Senior Football Championship Final, McFadden (still eligible for the competition) played in the 2015 Ulster Under-21 Football Championship final loss to Tyrone, scoring five points (including four frees).

McFadden started Rory Gallagher's first match in charge of the county, a 2015 Dr McKenna Cup away defeat to Derry. He started the opening fixture of the 2015 National Football League (against Derry as well but at home on this occasion). He also started the third fixture against Cork in Ballyshannon. He started the fifth fixture against Kerry at Austin Stack Park and scored a point. He also started the sixth and seventh fixtures against Tyrone and Mayo. Donegal qualified for the NFL semi-final. McFadden also started this game.

McFadden made substitute appearances in the 2015 Ulster Senior Football Championship quarter-final against Armagh and the semi-final against Derry. He did not feature in the final. McFadden started the 2015 All-Ireland Senior Football Championship qualifier defeat of Galway at Croke Park and the next game against Mayo at the same venue.

McFadden started the opening fixture of the 2016 National Football League away to Down. He then started the second fixture against Cork, a ten-point win in Ballyshannon. He also started the third, fourth, sixth and seventh fixtures against Mayo, Kerry, Dublin and Monaghan.

McFadden started the 2016 Ulster Senior Football Championship quarter-final against Fermanagh. He did not feature in the semi-final against Monaghan, the semi-final replay against the same opposition, nor in the final against Tyrone. Nor did he feature in the 2016 All-Ireland Senior Football Championship qualifier defeat of Cork at Croke Park. Nor did he feature against reigning All-Ireland SFC champions Dublin in the next game, at the same venue.

McFadden started the opening fixture of the 2017 National Football League against Kerry. He made substitute appearances in the second and third fixtures against Roscommon and Dublin. He started the fourth fixture against Cavan and scored 0–2. He did likewise in the fifth fixture against Tyrone. He then started the sixth and seventh fixtures against Monaghan and Mayo.

McFadden started the 2017 Ulster Senior Football Championship quarter-final against Antrim and scored 0–1. He made a substitute appearance in the semi-final loss to Tyrone and also scored 0–1. He started both the 2017 All-Ireland Senior Football Championship qualifier defeat of Meath at Páirc Tailteann and the qualifier loss to Galway at Markievicz Park.

Under the management of Declan Bonner, McFadden took on the captaincy during the 2018 Dr McKenna Cup and the 2018 National Football League, in the absence of regular team captain Michael Murphy, including in games against Kerry in Killarney and Dublin at Croke Park. He scored a point against Tyrone in the same competition. McFadden started the final as Donegal secured the 2018 Ulster Senior Football Championship. He had earlier scored a goal against Derry in the quarter-final. He also started the preliminary round against Cavan and the semi-final against Down.

McFadden again captained Donegal during the 2019 National Football League in the absence of injured regular captain Murphy. He started against Clare in the opening fixture of the competition in Ennis, scoring a point. He also started the second, third, fourth and fifth fixtures against Meath, Tipperary, Fermanagh and Armagh. He started and scored a point in both the sixth and seventh fixtures against Cork and Kildare. Donegal qualified for the National Football League Division 2 final and McFadden started the game as Donegal defeated Meath to win the title.

McFadden started each game of the 2019 Ulster Senior Football Championship, as Donegal defeated Fermanagh in the quarter-final, Tyrone in the semi-final and Cavan in the final (McFadden scored one point in the semi-final and one point in the final).

McFadden made a substitute appearance in Donegal's opening fixture of the 2020 National Football League against Mayo. He started the second game against Meath, scoring a point. He did not feature in the third game against Galway, but started the fourth game against Dublin, scoring a goal and a point. He scored a goal in the next league fixture against Monaghan. Then the COVID-19 pandemic brought play to a halt. Play resumed behind closed doors on 18 October with a home game against Tyrone; McFadden started that game. He did not participate in the final league game away to Kerry as he and other senior players (such as Michael Murphy, Ryan McHugh and Eoghan Bán Gallagher) were rested ahead of the 2020 Ulster Senior Football Championship quarter-final against Tyrone the following Sunday. McFadden started that opening victory against Tyrone. He also started the semi-final victory against Armagh, scoring a point from a mark. He also started the final against Cavan, in what proved to be the season's concluding game for his team.

McFadden started each of Donegal's four fixtures of the 2021 National Football League, against Tyrone, Monaghan, Armagh and Dublin respectively. In the 2021 Ulster Senior Football Championship, he started each of Donegal's three fixtures.

McFadden started Donegal's third, fourth, fifth and sixth fixtures of the 2022 National Football League, against Kerry, Tyrone, Dublin and Armagh respectively. In the 2022 Ulster Senior Football Championship, he started both of Donegal's first two fixtures, the quarter-final against Armagh and the semi-final against Cavan. He made a substitute appearance in the final against Derry during extra-time. He did not feature in the 2022 All-Ireland Senior Football Championship qualifier loss to Armagh.

He made his 101st appearance for Donegal against Monaghan in the 2023 National Football League, when he also captained the team.

== Coaching career ==
In 2022, McFadden became a member of his club's management team, under Shane Molloy and Antoine O'Hara.

McFadden has also won two Cumann na mBunscols County Championships with Scoil an Linbh Íosa two consecutive seasons (1922 and 1923)

== Personal life ==
Mr McFadden is a teacher at Scoil an Linbh Íosa, a primary school near Donegal Town.

He attended college in Dublin, beginning in his first year playing for the county team.

As of 2021, he was living in a house in Donegal Town with Eoghan Bán Gallagher.

== Honours ==
Donegal

- Ulster Senior Football Championship: 2014, 2018, 2019, 2025
- National Football League Division 2: 2019, 2024
- Ulster Under-21 Football Championship runner-up: 2015

Na Cealla Beaga

- Donegal Senior Football Championship runner-up: 2013
