= Shane Boyle =

Gaelic footballer

Shane Boyle is a Gaelic footballer who played with Donegal at all levels. He played when Donegal won a first Ulster Minor Title in 10 years at Croke Park in 2006. He then played in the All-Ireland semi-final against Kerry, also at Croke Park. His opponents with the Seniors included Tipperary (at Semple Stadium), Down and Meath. He played in the 2010 Donegal Senior Football Championship Final. He was integral to his club's progression through that competition but missed the 2013 Final due to being "cup tied", from playing in the United States.
