= Stephen McMenamin =

Donegal Gaelic footballer (born 1997/98)

Personal information
- Born: 1997/8
- Occupation: Student
- Height: 6 ft 0 in (183 cm)

Sport
- Sport: Gaelic football
- Position: Back
Club
- Years: Club
- 201?–: Red Hughs
Inter-county
- Years: County
- 201?–: Donegal
- Ulster titles: 3

Stephen McMenamin (born 1997/8) is an Irish Gaelic footballer who plays for Red Hughs and the Donegal county team.

== Playing career ==
County senior manager Rory Gallagher called McMenamin up ahead of the 2016 season as one of twelve new recruits, alongside such players as Eoghan Bán Gallagher, Caolan McGonagle and Ciarán Thompson.

Under the management of Declan Bonner, McMenamin started the opening fixture of the 2018 National Football League against Kerry in Killarney. He also started the next game against Galway. He also started the fourth and fifth games, against Kildare and Tyrone respectively.

McMenamin started the 2018 Ulster Senior Football Championship final as Donegal defeated Fermanagh. He had previously started the preliminary round against Cavan, and made substitute appearances in the quarter-final against Derry and the semi-final against Down, scoring a point in the semi-final.

McMenamin made a late substitute appearance against Clare in the opening fixture of the 2019 National Football League in Ennis. He made a substitute appearance in the next fixture against Meath. He started the third, fourth, fifth, sixth and seventh fixtures against Tipperary, Fermanagh, Armagh, Cork and Kildare. Donegal qualified for the National Football League Division 2 final and McMenamin started the game as Donegal defeated Meath to win the title.

McMenamin started each game of the 2019 Ulster Senior Football Championship and scored a point in the semi-final, as Donegal defeated Fermanagh in the quarter-final, Tyrone in the semi-final and Cavan in the final. An unsavoury incident during the 2019 semi-final led to McMenamin being assaulted by Tyrone player Tiernan McCann. The assault took the form of an act of fish-hooking. McMenamin's sight was affected by the incident. McCann put his hands into McMenamin's mouth and then stamped on his neck; analysts on The Sunday Game, such as Tomás Ó Sé and Ciarán Whelan, described the assault on McMenamin as "despicable" and "disgusting". McCann was given a two-match ban.

McMenamin did not feature in any of Donegal's first five fixtures of the 2020 National Football League against Mayo, Meath, Galway, Dublin and Monaghan. Then the COVID-19 pandemic brought play to a halt. Play resumed behind closed doors on 18 October with a home game against Tyrone; McMenamin started that game and scored three points. He also started the last league game away to Kerry.

McMenamin started and completed the 2020 Ulster Senior Football Championship quarter-final victory against Tyrone, the following week. He then exited the semi-final victory against Armagh in the opening minutes with a hamstring injury and, consequently, missed the final.

McMenamin did not feature in Donegal's first of four fixtures of the 2021 National Football League, against Tyrone, made a substitute appearance against Monaghan and started the last two games, against Armagh and Dublin. In the 2021 Ulster Senior Football Championship, he started the first and second of Donegal's three fixtures against Down in the opening round and against Derry in the quarter-final, before making an early substitute appearance for the injured Neil McGee against Tyrone in the semi-final.

== Honours ==
Player

- Ulster Senior Football Championship: 2018 2019, 2025
- National Football League Division 2: 2019

Individual

- All Star: 0
  - Nominated in 2019
