= Marty Carlin =

Donegal Gaelic footballer

Personal information
- Born: 1961 or 1962 (age 64–65)
- Occupation: Drink sales rep

Sport
- Sport: Gaelic football
Clubs
- Years: Club
- 19??–19?? 1980–199?: Robert Emmets; Red Hughs
Inter-county
- Years: County
- 19??–1990 1994: Donegal; Donegal

Marty Carlin (born 1961 or 1962) is an Irish former Gaelic footballer who played for Robert Emmets, Red Hughs and the Donegal county team.

His father John was a provincial high jump champion. His brother Sean achieved county records in the decathlon and the discus throw and narrowly missed the 1984 Summer Olympics with a hamstring injury. Sean, as well as their brothers Eugene, Joseph and Declan, all played for Red Hughs.

With his club Carlin scored 0–10 against Cill Chartha in the 1981 Donegal JFC final. He reached finals of the Donegal Senior Football Championship in 1986 and 1991. He won a Division 1 league title in 1994.

He also played other sports: golf; association football with Curragh Athletic and rugby union with Letterkenny. County manager Tom Conaghan dropped Carlin and Charlie Mulgrew from his team for one year after they played for Letterkenny in a Forster Cup final victory at Ravenhill in 1987.

Carlin returned to the team and played in both the 1989 Ulster Senior Football Championship final and replay. They were two of only six appearances he made for his county in championship football.

Carlin left the county team at the end of 1990 after informing manager Brian McEniff of his decision. Thus he missed the 1992 All-Ireland Senior Football Championship Final, which Donegal won. At the local homecoming, clubmate Donal Reid gave him a special mention and invited him onto the stage. After being awarded Donegal Player of the Year in 1993, Carlin was prompted to make a brief return for his county in 1994.

Since retiring, he has endured bowel cancer.
