= Eoghán Bán Gallagher =

Donegal Gaelic footballer (born 1996)

Personal information
- Native name: Eoghán Bán Ó Gallchóir (Irish)
- Born: 1996 (age 29–30)

Sport
- Sport: Gaelic football
- Position: Half-back
Club
- Years: Club
- 201?–: Na Cealla Beaga
College
- Years: College
- Ulster University at Jordanstown
Inter-county
- Years: County
- 2016–: Donegal
- Ulster titles: 3

Eoghán Bán Gallagher (born 1996) is an Irish Gaelic footballer who plays for Na Cealla Beaga and the Donegal county team.

== Early life ==
Bán Gallagher is the son of former Na Cealla Beaga and Donegal player John Bán Gallagher. He was educated at St Catherine's Vocational School. He attended Ulster University at Jordanstown.

== Club career ==
Bán Gallagher played as a 17-year-old child in his club's 2013 Donegal SFC final loss to Glenswilly.

== Inter-county career ==
=== Under-age ===
Bán Gallagher won the 2014 Ulster MFC title with Donegal, and was awarded Man of the Match in the final against Armagh. He then played in the 2014 All-Ireland MFC final loss to Kerry.

He played in the 2015 Ulster Under-21 Championship final loss to Tyrone, and co-captained (alongside Tony McClenaghan) the Donegal team that won the 2017 Ulster Under-21 Championship.

=== Senior ===
First featuring for his county at senior level under the management of Rory Gallagher, he made his senior debut in the 2016 Dr McKenna Cup match against Down. Bán Gallagher went on to make a number of appearances during Donegal's Division One campaign in the 2016 National League: first as a substitute against Cork in the second round of fixtures, then starts against Kerry and Roscommon, a substitute appearance against Dublin and a substitute appearance in the league semi-final defeat to Dublin. He made a substitute appearance against Tyrone in the final of the 2016 Ulster Championship.

Bán Gallagher started the 2017 Ulster Senior Football Championship quarter-final victory against Antrim and the semi-final loss to Tyrone. He also started the 2017 All-Ireland Senior Football Championship qualifier defeat of Meath at Páirc Tailteann. He then started the qualifier loss to Galway at Markievicz Park.

Under the management of Declan Bonner, Bán Gallagher continued to prosper. He won the 2018 Ulster Championship, scoring Donegal's opening goal in the final. He had previously started the preliminary round against Cavan, the quarter-final against Derry and the semi-final against Down. He appeared at left corner-back on The Sunday Game Team of the Year 2018. He was also nominated for an All Star.

Donegal qualified for the 2019 National Football League Division 2 final and Gallagher started the game as Donegal defeated Meath to win the title.

Gallagher added another Ulster medal in June 2019, scoring a point as the Tír Chonaill men retained their title with an eight point win over Cavan in the final. He had previously started against Fermanagh in the quarter-final and Tyrone in the semi-final. On 18 July 2019, BBC Sport reported that Gallagher had been ruled out for the remainder of the season after sustaining a broken ankle during a training session on the previous evening. He had just completed the championship victory over Meath the previous weekend.

He tore his hamstring while training for the last 2025 NFL game against Mayo, he would miss the entirety of the Ulster SFC campaign and only return for the All-Ireland SFC.

== Style of play ==
Bán Gallagher is regarded as a top ball carrier. Though predominantly placed in defensive positions, he has been known to get forward and score goals for his team. He is noted for his white footwear when on the field of play.

== Personal life ==
As of 2021, he was living in a house in Donegal Town with Hugh McFadden. He is a supporter of the English association football team Liverpool F.C.

== Honours ==
Donegal

- Ulster Senior Football Championship: 2018 2019, 2024
- National Football League Division 2: 2019
- Ulster Under-21 Football Championship: 2017
- Ulster Under-21 Football Championship runner-up: 2015
- All-Ireland Minor Football Championship runner-up: 2014
- Ulster Minor Football Championship: 2014

Na Cealla Beaga

- Donegal Senior Football Championship runner-up: 2013

Individual

- All Star nomination: 2018
- The Sunday Game Team of the Year: 2018
- Irish News Ulster All Star: 2018
- Ulster Minor Football Championship Man of the Match: 2014
- Donegal News Sports Personality of the Month: June 2018
- Donegal Footballer of the Year: 2018
