= Manus Boyle (Gaelic footballer) =

Irish Gaelic footballer (born 1966)

Personal information
- Born: September 1966 (age 60)

Sport
- Sport: Gaelic football
- Position: Forward
Club
- Years: Club
- 19??–?: Na Cealla Beaga
Inter-county
Years	County	Apps (scores)
1985–1998	Donegal	116 (14–308)
Inter-county titles
- Ulster titles: 2
- All-Irelands: 1
- All Stars: 0

Manus Boyle (born 1966) is an Irish former Gaelic footballer who played for Na Cealla Beaga and the Donegal county team. He writes a column for the Donegal Democrat ("The Breaking Ball") and is a health coach.

He played county football from 1985 to 1998, mostly at forward and was a free kick specialist.

He debuted for Donegal at 18 in 1985, fell out with manager Tom Conaghan in the 1980s, missing the 1989 Ulster SFC final, Brian McEniff restored him to the team in time for the 1990 Ulster SFC.

He played his last competitive game for Donegal in the 1998 Ulster SFC final against Derry. Earlier the same year, he contracted a virus that caused severe weight loss. He could not start the 1st round but played the semi-final against Cavan.

In May 2012, the Irish Independent named him as part of Donegal's "greatest team" of the past 50 years.

At club level he played for Na Cealla Beaga. He co-managed the team with Barry McGowan until 2008. Aged 44, returned to play football as his club reached 2010 Donegal SFC final.

He played soccer for St Catherine's.

Since March 2002, he was writing a column for the Donegal Democrat, "The Breaking Ball".

In 2016, aged 50, he returned to education to study "Applied Health and Wellness Coaching" at St Angela's College in Sligo.

== Honours ==
Donegal

- All-Ireland Senior Football Championship: 1992
- Ulster Senior Football Championship: 1990, 1992
- All-Ireland Under-21 Football Championship: 1987
- Ulster Under-21 Football Championship: 1987

Individual

- All-Ireland Senior Football Championship Final Man of the Match: 1992

Achievements
Preceded by ? ?	All-Ireland Senior Football Final; Man of the Match; 1992	Succeeded by ? (?)
