= Peter Witherow =

Irish Gaelic footballer (born 1987)

Personal information
- Born: 1987 (age 38–39)
- Occupation: Personal Trainer
- Height: 6 ft 1 in (185 cm)

Sport
- Sport: Gaelic football
Clubs
- Years: Club
- 2007–2017 2008 2017: St Michael's; Donegal Boston; Donegal New York
Inter-county
- Years: County
- 2007–2017 2017: Donegal; New York
Inter-county titles
- Ulster titles: ?
- All-Irelands: 1
- NFL: 1

Peter Witherow (born 1987) is an Irish Gaelic footballer who plays for Donegal New York and, formerly, for St Michael's and the county teams of Donegal and New York.

He is from Dunfanaghy.

Witherow was part of the Donegal senior set-up from the reign of Brian McIver onwards and lined out for them in the Dr McKenna Cup and National Football League. He was panel member when Donegal won the 2007 National Football League. He was also a panel member when Donegal won the 2012 All-Ireland Senior Football Championship.

He played for Donegal Boston in 2008.

Witherow moved to New York in 2016 and took up work in a gym, having left the University of Limerick with a master's in sports performance and obtained a graduate visa. Among those to assist him was fellow expatriate Ross Wherity. Witherow played at cornerback for the New York team against Sligo in the 2017 Connacht Senior Football Championship, having earlier played two challenge matches against his old side Donegal during Easter.
