= John Cunningham (Gaelic footballer) =

Irish Gaelic footballer

Personal information
- Nickname: Razda

Sport
- Sport: Gaelic football
Club
- Years: Club
- 19??–: Na Cealla Beaga
Inter-county
- Years: County
- 19??–199?: Donegal
Inter-county titles
- Ulster titles: 2
- All-Irelands: 1

John Cunningham is an Irish former Gaelic footballer who played for Na Cealla Beaga and the Donegal county team.

He won the 1987 All-Ireland Under-21 Football Championship with Donegal.

He returned from London ahead of the 1990 Ulster Senior Football Championship. He played in the final against Armagh, which Donegal won.

He was a panellist on the day of the 1992 All-Ireland Senior Football Championship Final but did not play. He had lost his place in the team following his team's Ulster final win.

Cunningham has also managed his club over many years. And he has been chairman.

He is married to Fionnula.
