= Barry Cunningham (Gaelic footballer) =

Irish Gaelic footballer

Personal information
- Born: 1965/6
- Occupation: Quantity surveyor
- Height: 6 ft 0 in (183 cm)

Sport
- Sport: Gaelic football
Club
- Years: Club
- 19??–?: Na Cealla Beaga
Club titles
- Donegal titles: 5
Inter-county
- Years: County
- 19??–?: Donegal
Inter-county titles
- All-Irelands: 1

Barry Cunningham (born 1965/6) is an Irish former Gaelic footballer who played for Na Cealla Beaga and the Donegal county team. As of 2009, he was a quantity surveyor.

== Inter-county ==
Cunningham won the 1987 All-Ireland Under-21 Football Championship with Donegal.

He was a member of Donegal's 1992 All-Ireland Senior Football Championship winning panel. He played as a midfielder and came on as a substitute for calf injury victim Brian Murray in the second half of the 1992 All-Ireland Final as Donegal defeated Dublin by a scoreline of 0–18 to 0–14.

== Club ==
At club level he played for Na Cealla Beaga. He won five Donegal Senior Football Championships—1988, 1991, 1992, 1995 and 1996. In 1991 he reached the final of the Ulster Senior Club Football Championship.
