= Peter McGinley =

Irish Gaelic footballer (born 1973/74)

Personal information
- Born: 1973/74

Sport
- Sport: Gaelic football
Inter-county
- Years: County
- 199?–?: Donegal

Peter McGinley (born 1973/74) is an Irish Gaelic football coach and former player for the Donegal county team.

P. J. McGowan was the manager to introduce McGinley to the Donegal senior team.

McGinley emerged as a player at the age of 17 when he played for his club in their three matches as they advanced to the 1991 Ulster Senior Club Football Championship final; he had not played during the 1991 Donegal Senior Football Championship which his club had won to qualify for the Ulster Club SFC.

McGinley managed his club to the final of the 2010 Donegal Senior Football Championship but Naomh Conaill defeated them, following a series of injuries in advance that made competing in that game all the more difficult. He also served as Jim McGuinness's assistant manager with the under-21 county team that reached the 2010 All-Ireland Under-21 Football Championship final but did not join McGuinness in his later senior role due to work commitments.

McGinley coached (at under-18 level) Séamus Coleman, who went on to play for League of Ireland side Sligo Rovers, transferred to English Premier League side Everton and took over as captain of the Republic of Ireland national football team during the UEFA Euro 2016 final tournament in France.
