= 1995–96 National Football League (Ireland) =

Gaelic football competition

League details
- Dates: 12 November 1995 – 5 May 1996
- Teams: 33

League champions
- Winners: Derry (4th win)
- Captain: Henry Downey
- Manager: Brian Mullins

League runners-up
- Runners-up: Donegal
- Captain: Noel Hegarty
- Manager: P. J. McGowan

Other division winners
- Division 2: Cork
- Division 3: Mayo
- Division 4: Wicklow

The 1995–96 National Football League, known for sponsorship reasons as the Church & General National Football League, was the 65th staging of the National Football League (NFL), an annual Gaelic football tournament for the Gaelic Athletic Association county teams of Ireland.

Derry successfully defended its second consecutive season title in the final against Donegal.

== Format ==
The teams are in four divisions, three of 8 teams and one of 9. Each team plays all the other teams in its division once: either home or away. Teams earn 2 points for a win and 1 for a draw. The top two teams in Divisions 2, 3 and 4 are promoted, while the bottom two teams in Divisions 1, 2 and 3 are relegated.

Eight teams contest the NFL quarter-finals:

- The top 4 teams in Division 1
- The top 2 teams in Division 2
- The first-placed team in Division 3
- The first-placed team in Division 4

== League Phase ==
=== Division One ===
==== Play-Offs ====
31 March 1996 For 6th Place	Kildare	2-12 — 0-11	Laois	Croke Park

==== Table ====
Team	Pld	W	D	L	Pts	Status
Donegal	7	3	3	1	9	Advance to quarter-finals
Meath	7	4	1	2	9	Advance to quarter-finals
Derry	7	4	1	2	9	Advance to quarter-finals
Kerry	7	3	2	2	8	Advance to quarter-finals
Tyrone	7	3	1	3	7
Kildare	7	2	2	3	6
Laois	7	3	0	4	6	Relegated to Division Two of the 1996–97 NFL
Clare	7	1	0	6	2	Relegated to Division Two of the 1996–97 NFL

=== Division 2 ===
==== Table ====
Team	Pld	W	D	L	Pts	Status
Cork	7	6	0	1	12	Promoted to Division One of the 1996–97 NFL and advance to quarter-finals
Cavan	7	5	0	2	10	Promoted to Division One of the 1996–97 NFL and advance to quarter-finals
Armagh	7	4	0	3	8
Leitrim	7	4	0	3	8
Dublin	7	4	0	3	8
Louth	7	3	0	4	6
Westmeath	7	1	0	6	2	Relegated to Division Three of the 1996–97 NFL
Down	7	1	0	6	2	Relegated to Division Three of the 1996–97 NFL

=== Division 3 ===
==== Play-Offs ====
31 March 1996 For 6th Place	Antrim	3-6 — 0-6	Fermanagh	St Tiernach's Park, Clones

==== Table ====
Team	Pld	W	D	L	Pts	Status
Mayo	7	7	0	0	14	Promoted to Division Two of the 1996–97 NFL and advance to quarter-finals
Monaghan	7	6	0	1	12	Promoted to Division Two of the 1996–97 NFL
Roscommon	7	4	1	2	9
Galway	7	2	1	4	5
Wexford	7	2	1	4	5
Antrim	7	2	0	5	4
Fermanagh	7	2	0	5	4	Relegated to Division Four of the 1996–97 NFL
Sligo	7	1	1	5	3	Relegated to Division Four of the 1996–97 NFL

=== Division 4 ===
==== Table ====
Team	Pld	W	D	L	Pts	Status
Wicklow	8	7	1	0	15	Promoted to Division Three of the 1996–97 NFL and advance to quarter-finals
Longford	8	6	1	1	13	Promoted to Division Three of the 1996–97 NFL
Offaly	8	5	1	2	11
Carlow	8	4	1	3	9
Limerick	8	4	0	4	8
Tipperary	8	4	0	4	8
Waterford	8	2	0	6	4
London	8	1	0	7	2
Kilkenny	8	1	0	7	2

== Knockout phase ==
=== Quarter-finals ===
31 March 1996

Donegal	2-12 – 1-8	Wicklow

Croke Park,
Attendance: 11,004

31 March 1996

Mayo	2-10 – 1-10	Meath

Dr. Hyde Park, Roscommon

31 March 1996

Cork	2-14 – 0-18 AET	Kerry

Páirc Uí Chaoimh, Cork
Attendance: 9,432

31 March 1996

Derry	0-12 – 0-11	Cavan

St Tiernach's Park, Clones

=== Semi-finals ===
21 April 1996

Donegal	0-10 – 0-9	Cork

Croke Park, Dublin

21 April 1996

Derry	1-12 – 0-7	Mayo

Croke Park, Dublin

=== Final ===
5 May 1996
Final

Derry	1-16 – 1-9	Donegal

Croke Park, Dublin
Attendance: 24,298
Referee: Michael Curley (Galway)
