= 1987 All-Ireland Under-21 Football Championship =

Gaelic football competition

Championship details

All-Ireland Champions
- Winning team: Donegal (2nd win)
- Captain: John Cunningham

All-Ireland Finalists
- Losing team: Kerry

Provincial Champions
- Munster: Kerry
- Leinster: Laois
- Ulster: Donegal
- Connacht: Galway

The 1987 All-Ireland Under-21 Football Championship was the 24th staging of the All-Ireland Under-21 Football Championship since its establishment by the Gaelic Athletic Association in 1964.

Cork entered the championship as defending champions; however, they were defeated by Tipperary in the Munster semi-final.

On 28 June 1987, Donegal won the championship following a 1–12 to 2–4 defeat of Kerry in an All-Ireland final replay. This was their second All-Ireland title overall and their first in five championship seasons; the following players won the Sam Maguire Cup with their county in 1992: Manus Boyle, John Cunningham, John Joe Doherty, Barry McGowan and Tommy Ryan; Boyle scored 1–7 in the final; Sean Bonner (brother of Declan) was in the full-back line; the losing Kerry team featured Mick Galwey, who scored a goal.

== Results ==
=== All-Ireland Under-21 Football Championship ===
Semi-finals

17 May 1987 Semi-final	Domegal	1–7 - 1–6	Laois	Páirc Seán Mac Diarmada, Carrick

29 May 1987 Semi-final	Kerry	1–9 - 1–7	Galway	Cusack Park, Ennis

Finals

7 June 1987 Final	Donegal	0–10 - 1–7	Kerry	Tuam Stadium, Tuam

28 June 1987 Final replay	Donegal	1–12 - 2–4	Kerry	Dr. Hyde Park, Roscommon

== Statistics ==
=== Miscellaneous ===
- The All-Ireland final ended in a draw for the fifth time in the history of the championship.
