= Barry McGowan =

Irish Gaelic footballer

Personal information
- Born: January 1967 (age 59)
- Occupation: ESB worker

Sport
- Sport: Gaelic football
- Position: Corner back
Club
- Years: Club
- ?–?: Na Cealla Beaga
Inter-county
- Years: County
- 1989–1998: Donegal
Inter-county titles
- Ulster titles: 2
- All-Irelands: 1

Barry McGowan (born January 1967) is an Irish former Gaelic footballer who played for Na Cealla Beaga and the Donegal county team.

As of 2009, he was working for the ESB.

== Inter-county ==
McGowan won the 1987 All-Ireland Under-21 Football Championship with Donegal.

He fell out with manager Tom Conaghan during the 1980s. Brian McEniff restored him to the team in time for the 1990 Ulster SFC. McGowan made a late substitute appearance for Declan Bonner against Armagh in the 1990 Ulster Senior Football Championship final, won by Donegal.

He was a member of Donegal's 1992 All-Ireland Senior Football Championship winning team. Deployed as a defender, he started at right corner back in the 1992 All-Ireland Final as Donegal defeated Dublin by a scoreline of 0–18 to 0–14.

His last Championship game for Donegal was the 1998 Ulster Senior Football Championship final loss to Derry. He gave away his final county jersey — he thinks — to a "young fella" from Derry. Himself and Manus Boyle (who had just also played his last game for Donegal) went "down the town" (Clones) and got left behind, missing the Donegal team bus but later catching the Killybegs bus. Boyle and McGowan remain close friends.

Former Derry player Joe Brolly holds McGowan in high regard.

In May 2012, the Irish Independent named him in its selection of Donegal's "greatest team" spanning the previous 50 years.

The Donegal News has described him as "probably the most reclusive or quietest member" of Donegal's 1992 team and noted it was rare to encounter him in print or on the airwaves.

== Club ==
At club level McGowan played for Na Cealla Beaga. He co-managed the team with Manus Boyle until 2008. He also played association football for St Catherine's.
