= Ulster Under-20 Football Championship =

Gaelic football competition in Ulster

- Current season or competition: 2026 Ulster Under-20 Football Championship
- Irish: Craobh Peile Uladh Fé-20
- Code: Gaelic football
- Founded: 1963; 63 years ago
- Region: Ulster (GAA)
- Trophy: Irish News Cup
- No. of teams: 9
- Title holders: Tyrone (18th title)
- Most titles: Tyrone (18 titles)
- Sponsors: EirGrid
- TV partner: TG4
- Official website: Ulster GAA website

The Ulster GAA Football Under-20 Championship, known simply as the Ulster Under-20 Championship, is an annual inter-county Gaelic football competition organised by the Ulster Council of the Gaelic Athletic Association (GAA). It is the highest inter-county football competition for male players between the ages of 17 and 20 in the province of Ulster. The championship was contested as the Ulster Under-21 Championship between 1963 and 2016 before changing to an under-20 age category from 2018. It is sponsored by EirGrid.

The final, currently held in March, serves as the culmination of a series of games played during a three-week period, and the results determine which team receives the J. J. Fahy Cup. The championship has always been played on a straight knockout basis whereby once a team loses they are eliminated from the championship.

The Ulster Championship is an integral part of the wider GAA Football Under-20 All-Ireland Championship. The winners of the Ulster final, like their counterparts in the other three provinces, advance to the semi-final stage of the All-Ireland series of games.

Nine teams currently participate in the Ulster Championship. Tyrone are the most successful team with 18 titles. The title has been won at least once by all nine teams, with all of them winning the title more than once. Tyrone captured their most recent title by defeating Monaghan on a scoreline of 4-19 to 0-22 at the Athletic Grounds, Armagh.

== Roll of honour ==
#	County	Titles	Runners-up	Years won	Years runners-up
1	Tyrone	18	8	1972, 1973, 1980, 1990, 1991, 1992, 2000, 2001, 2002, 2003, 2006, 2015, 2019, 2020, 2022, 2024, 2025, 2026	1971, 1974, 1975, 1979, 1985, 2011, 2012, 2016
2	Down	11	8	1965, 1977, 1978, 1979, 1984, 1985, 2005, 2008, 2009, 2021, 2023	1966, 1969, 1976, 1980, 1989, 1990, 1991, 1993
3	Derry	8	12	1967, 1968, 1976, 1983, 1986, 1993, 1997, 2018	1972, 1982, 1994, 1996, 1998, 2004, 2006, 2008, 2017, 2019, 2023, 2024
4	Donegal	8	10	1963, 1964, 1966, 1982, 1987, 1995, 2010, 2017	1981, 1983, 1986, 1999, 2000, 2013, 2014, 2015, 2020, 2025
5	Cavan	6	10	1988, 1996, 2011, 2012, 2013, 2014	1963, 1965, 1970, 1977, 1978, 1995, 2002, 2005, 2010, 2022
6	Antrim	4	2	1969, 1974, 1975, 1989	1984, 1988
7	Monaghan	3	9	1981, 1999, 2016	1964, 1967, 1968, 1973, 1987, 1992, 2003, 2007, 2021, 2026
7	Fermanagh	3	2	1970, 1971, 1994	1997, 2001
7	Armagh	3	1	1998, 2004, 2007	2009

== List of finals ==
Under 20 Competition
Year	Winner	Score	Opponent	Score
2026	Tyrone	4-19	Monaghan	0-22
2025	Tyrone	1-19	Donegal	2-14
2024	Tyrone	3–10 (3)	Derry	2–13 (1)
2023	Down	2-11	Derry	0-09
2022	Tyrone	0-11	Cavan	0-10
2021	Down	3-15	Monaghan	1-14
2020	Tyrone	1-11	Donegal	0-09
2019	Tyrone	4-13	Derry	1-10
2018	Derry	2-15	Armagh	0-14
Under 21 Competition
Year	Winner	Score	Opponent	Score
2017	Donegal	3-17	Derry	0-13
2016	Monaghan	0-13	Tyrone	0-11
2015	Tyrone	1-11	Donegal	0-13
2014	Cavan	2-06	Donegal	0-08
2013	Cavan	0-13	Donegal	1-06
2012	Cavan	1-10	Tyrone	0-10
2011	Cavan	1-10	Tyrone	0-10
2010	Donegal	2-08	Cavan	0-07
2009	Down	1-14	Armagh	2-10
2008	Down	3-11	Derry	1-14
2007	Armagh	1-16	Monaghan	1-09
2006	Tyrone	0-12	Derry	1-07
2005	Down	2-14	Cavan	2-12
2004	Armagh	2-12	Derry	0-04
2003	Tyrone	2-08	Monaghan	0-11
2002	Tyrone	0-13	Cavan	1-07
2001	Tyrone	1-19	Fermanagh	0-10
2000	Tyrone	1-18	Donegal	1-04
1999	Monaghan	0-12	Donegal	1-08
1998	Armagh	1-08	Derry	0-10
1997	Derry	1-12	Fermanagh	1-06
1996	Cavan	1-11	Derry	1-05
1995	Donegal	1-09, 3-11 (R)	Cavan	1-09, 1-11 (R)
1994	Fermanagh	2-08	Derry	0-08
1993	Derry	1-09	Down	1-08
1992	Tyrone	0-14	Monaghan	2-06
1991	Tyrone	3-10	Down	0-08
1990	Tyrone	2-08	Down	0-11
1989	Antrim	1-06	Down	1-05
1988	Cavan	3-10	Antrim	0-06
1987	Donegal	0-07, 1-11 (R)	Monaghan	1-04, 0-08 (R)
1986	Derry	4-07	Donegal	0-06
1985	Down	3-07	Tyrone	0-07
1984	Down	1-10	Antrim	1-08
1983	Derry	3-13	Donegal	1-03
1982	Donegal	0-10	Derry	1-05
1981	Monaghan	0-08	Donegal	0-06
1980	Tyrone	4-04	Down	2-05
1979	Down	1-09	Tyrone	0-05
1978	Down	0-11	Cavan	1-06
1977	Down	3-05	Cavan	0-10
1976	Derry	1-06	Down	1-04
1975	Antrim	2-07	Tyrone	0-07
1974	Antrim	2-06	Tyrone	1-08
1973	Tyrone	2-14	Monaghan	2-05
1972	Tyrone	1-07, 3-13 (R)	Derry	1-07, 1-06 (R)
1971	Fermanagh	2-12	Tyrone	1-08
1970	Fermanagh	0-13	Cavan	0-08
1969	Antrim	2-08	Down	1-09
1968	Derry	4-09	Monaghan	2-04
1967	Derry	1-11	Monaghan	1-04
1966	Donegal	2-12	Down	1-06
1965	Down	0-09	Cavan	1-02
1964	Donegal	2-14	Monaghan	0-04
1963	Donegal	3-06	Cavan	1-03

== Records and statistics ==
=== Final ===
==== Team ====
- Most titles: 18:
  - Tyrone (1972, 1973, 1980, 1990, 1991, 1992, 2000, 2001, 2002, 2003, 2006, 2015, 2019, 2020, 2022, 2024, 2025, 2026)
- Most consecutive title wins: 4:
  - Tyrone (2000, 2001, 2002, 2003)
  - Cavan ( 2011, 2012, 2013, 2014)
- Most appearances in a final: 26:
  - Tyrone (1971, 1972, 1973, 1974, 1975, 1979, 1980, 1985, 1990, 1991, 1992, 2000, 2001, 2002, 2003, 2006, 2011, 2012, 2015, 2016, 2019, 2020, 2022, 2024, 2025, 2026)

=== Teams ===
==== By decade ====
The most successful team of each decade, judged by number of Ulster Championship titles, is as follows:

- 1960s: 3 for Donegal (1963–64-6)
- 1970s: 3 for Down (1977-78-79)
- 1980s: 2 each for Donegal (1982–87), Derry (1983–86) and Down (1985–86)
- 1990s: 3 for Tyrone (1990-91-92)
- 2000s: 5 for Tyrone (2000-01-02-03-06)
- 2010s: 4 for Cavan (2011-12-13-14)

==== Gaps ====
Top ten longest gaps between successive championship titles:

- 23 years: Fermanagh (1971-1994)
- 21 years: Derry (1997-2018)
- 20 years: Down (1985-2005)
- 18 years: Monaghan (1981-1999)
- 17 years: Monaghan (1999-2016)
- 16 years: Donegal (1966-1982)
- 15 years: Donegal (1995-2010)
- 15 years: Cavan (1996-2011)
- 14 years: Antrim (1975-1989)
- 12 years: Down (1965-1977)

== Sources ==
- Roll of Honour on gaainfo.com
- www.kilkennygaa.ie Roll of Honour (at Downloads/2011 Bible Web.pdf)
