= 2014 Donegal County Council election =

Part of the 2014 Irish local elections

← 2009	23 May 2014	2019 →

All 37 seats on Donegal County Council 19 seats needed for a majority
- Turnout: 58.1%
	First party	Second party	Third party
Party	Fianna Fáil	Sinn Féin	Fine Gael
Seats won	11	9	6
Seat change	+1	+5	-2
	Fourth party	Fifth party
Party	Labour	Independent
Seats won	1	10
Seat change	-1	+5
- Map showing the area of Donegal County Council
Council control before election
Fianna Fáil
Council control after election
Fianna Fáil

An election to all 37 seats on Donegal County Council took place on 23 May 2014 as part of the 2014 Irish local elections. County Donegal was divided into 5 local electoral areas to elect councillors for a five-year term of office on the electoral system of proportional representation by means of the single transferable vote (PR-STV). In addition, the town councils of Ballyshannon, Bundoran and Letterkenny were all abolished.

The arrest of one candidate, a woman, was ordered ahead of the election.

Gary Doherty of Sinn Féin and independent Frank McBrearty Jnr, a former county mayor and formerly of Labour, were the first candidates to be elected. Both were elected on the first count in the Stranorlar Electoral Area. Another candidate Ian McGarvey, who went into the election as Ireland's oldest Mayor, was re-elected in the Letterkenny Electoral Area. The count concluded in Letterkenny in the early hours of Monday 26 May, when Mick Quinn of Sinn Féin narrowly triumphed over independent Donal Cullen just after 5 am. Independents did well, according to local media in the Donegal LEA at the expense of both Fianna Fáil and Fine Gael and would increase their representation by 5 overall on the council. Overall while Fianna Fáil made gains in Letterkenny and Glenties they lost a seat in Donegal compared to 2009. Michael Farren retained a solitary seat for Labour in Inishowen. Fine Gael lost 2 seats overall in the Donegal and Inishowen LEAs. Sinn Féin won a second seat in each LEA except Donegal.

== Results by party ==
Results published here. (archive link)

Party	Seats	±	1st pref	FPv%	±%
Fianna Fáil	11	+1	21,069	29.1%	
Sinn Féin	9	+5	14,204	19.6%	
Fine Gael	6	-2	11,351	15.7%	
Labour	1	-1	2,723	3.8%	
Independent	10	+5	21,258	29.4%	
Total	37	+8	72,306	100.0%	—

== Results by local electoral area ==
*: Outgoing councillor.

=== Donegal ===
Donegal: 6 seats
Party	Candidate	FPv%	Count												
Party	Candidate	FPv%	1	2	3	4	5	6	7	8	9	10	11	12	13
Independent	Niamh Kennedy	12.52	1,738	1,742	1,755	1,790	1,838	1,886	1,940	2,174					
Fianna Fáil	Sean McEniff	11.83	1,642	1,643	1,671	1,686	1,739	1,748	1,890	1,896	1,897	1,906	1,913	2,244	
Independent	Tom Conaghan	11.38	1,580	1,581	1,597	1,648	1,652	1,801	1,920	1,943	1,948	2,117			
Independent	John Campbell	8.78	1,219	1,221	1,237	1,259	1,272	1,320	1,370	1,441	1,475	1,671	1,706	1,744	1,752
Fianna Fáil	Brendan Byrne	7.90	1,096	1,096	1,098	1,103	1,107	1,116	1,207	1,380	1,441	1,584	1,599	1,624	1,639
Sinn Féin	Noel Jordan	7.84	1,088	1,088	1,101	1,112	1,122	1,162	1,194	1,219	1,242	1,355	1,366	1,827	1,888
Fine Gael	Barry O'Neill	7.65	1,062	1,064	1,072	1,089	1,125	1,141	1,163	1,227	1,235	1,542	1,566	1,703	1,785
Sinn Féin	Michael McMahon	6.99	970	973	1,026	1,036	1,159	1,166	1,195	1,202	1,206	1,211	1,211		
Fine Gael	John Boyle	6.39	887	887	888	897	897	913	931	1,125	1,178				
Fine Gael	John McNulty	5.88	816	816	822	827	828	839	845						
Fianna Fáil	Michael Naughton	4.25	590	591	604	621	628	651							
Independent	Jonathan Kennedy	2.71	376	376	381	407	412								
Independent	Joseph McNulty	2.56	356	364	376	379									
Independent	Bernie Mulhern	1.62	225	225	235										
Independent	Laurence McManus	1.51	209	211											
Independent	Patricia McCafferty	0.19	27												
Electorate: 22,050 Valid: 13,881 (62.95%) Spoilt: 132 Quota: 1,984 Turnout: 14,014 (63.55%)

=== Glenties ===
Glenties: 6 seats
Party	Candidate	FPv%	Count									
Party	Candidate	FPv%	1	2	3	4	5	6	7	8	9	10
Fianna Fáil	Seamus O Domhnaill	14.64	1,889									
Sinn Féin	Marie Therese Gallagher	13.60	1,754	1,792	1,794	1,816	1,890					
Fianna Fáil	Enda Bonner	9.64	1,244	1,266	1,270	1,280	1,310	1,422	1,476	1,478	1,518	1,669
Sinn Féin	John O Fearraigh	9.51	1,227	1,230	1,239	1,269	1,270	1,431	1,616	1,628	1,864	
Independent	Micheál Cholm MacGiolla Easbuig	8.57	1,106	1,118	1,120	1,146	1,160	1,227	1,341	1,346	1,413	1,612
Fine Gael	Terence Slowey	7.17	925	931	931	1,025	1,104	1,106	1,163	1,169	1,211	1,399
Fianna Fáil	Ian Molloy	6.94	895	901	903	906	1,119	1,139	1,149	1,160	1,182	1,273
Labour	Seamus Rodgers	5.75	742	762	764	797	858	886	1,009	1,019	1,096	
Independent	Michael McClafferty	5.59	721	726	736	868	888	903	962	963		
Independent	Padraig Doherty	5.04	650	661	664	736	745	832				
Independent	Brian Carr	4.26	550	555	555	560						
Fianna Fáil	Hughie MacGiolla Bhride	4.23	546	548	551	565	567					
Fine Gael	John Curran	3.91	504	504	513							
Direct Democracy	Joe McCarron	1.13	146									
Electorate: 22,325 Valid: 12,899 (57.78%) Spoilt: 136 Quota: 1,843 Turnout: 13,035 (58.39%)

=== Inishowen ===
Inishowen: 9 seats
Party	Candidate	FPv%	Count											
Party	Candidate	FPv%	1	2	3	4	5	6	7	8	9	10	11	12
Fianna Fáil	Martin McDermott	12.51	2,002											
Sinn Féin	Jack Murray	9.23	1,476	1,483	1,499	1,546	1,553	1,582	1,591	1,594	1,706			
Sinn Féin	Albert Doherty	8.75	1,399	1,459	1,463	1,483	1,486	1,511	1,636					
Fianna Fáil	Paul Canning	8.24	1,318	1,334	1,336	1,342	1,346	1,406	1,422	1,423	1,436	1,436	1,462	1,466
Independent	Nicholas Crossan	7.83	1,252	1,258	1,284	1,327	1,430	1,441	1,506	1,510	1,652			
Fine Gael	Bernard McGuinness	7.38	1,180	1,271	1,278	1,287	1,310	1,340	1,488	1,499	1,519	1,523	1,726	
Fianna Fáil	Rena Donaghey	7.12	1,139	1,184	1,193	1,207	1,264	1,368	1,406	1,409	1,473	1,477	1,536	1,539
Labour	Martin Farren	6.49	1,038	1,051	1,054	1,064	1,068	1,199	1,219	1,223	1,256	1,258	1,403	1,427
Fine Gael	John Ryan	6.33	1,013	1,017	1,027	1,052	1,147	1,155	1,176	1,177	1,207	1,213	1,360	1,452
Sinn Féin	Ciaran McLaughlin	6.13	980	989	1,009	1,034	1,063	1,074	1,093	1,096	1,224	1,268	1,307	1,310
Fine Gael	Mickey Doherty	3.99	638	652	654	676	686	754	800	803	819	820		
People Before Profit	Joe Murphy	3.76	601	609	655	711	724	738	785	788				
Independent	Patrick McCarroll	3.47	555	595	612	648	654	671						
Fianna Fáil	Mary McCauley	3.23	516	592	596	602	605							
Fine Gael	Peter McLaughlin	2.24	359	362	369	374								
Independent	Ryan Stewart	2.08	332	340	361									
Direct Democracy	Eilis Haden	0.66	106	107										
Independent	Paul Ferguson	0.58	93											
Electorate: 30,653 Valid: 15,997 (52.19%) Spoilt: 212 Quota: 1,600 Turnout: 16,209 (52.88%)

=== Letterkenny ===
Letterkenny: 10 seats
Party	Candidate	FPv%	Count																
Party	Candidate	FPv%	1	2	3	4	5	6	7	8	9	10	11	12	13	14	15	16	17
Fianna Fáil	Liam Blaney	9.33	1,763																
Fianna Fáil	Ciaran Brogan	8.98	1,698	1,701	1,707	1,718	1,718	1,730											
Independent	John O'Donnell	8.95	1,692	1,697	1,708	1,721													
Independent	Ian McGarvey	7.08	1,338	1,345	1,352	1,366	1,367	1,403	1,424	1,424	1,447	1,478	1,504	1,541	1,648	1,744			
Fianna Fáil	James Pat McDaid	6.95	1,314	1,321	1,328	1,331	1,331	1,340	1,373	1,373	1,430	1,459	1,496	1,645	1,759				
Sinn Féin	Gerry McMonagle	6.42	1,213	1,214	1,232	1,249	1,249	1,272	1,280	1,280	1,307	1,312	1,372	1,414	1,441	1,530	1,533	1,546	1,552
Independent	Michael McBride	6.02	1,138	1,141	1,144	1,160	1,161	1,181	1,203	1,204	1,231	1,268	1,289	1,330	1,456	1,522	1,533	1,633	1,698
Sinn Féin	Mick Quinn	5.69	1,076	1,078	1,085	1,090	1,090	1,106	1,118	1,118	1,122	1,132	1,144	1,157	1,212	1,244	1,254	1,297	1,304
Independent	Dessie Shiels	5.05	955	956	969	993	993	1,019	1,056	1,056	1,120	1,151	1,229	1,300	1,381	1,514	1,522	1,555	1,573
Fine Gael	Jimmy Kavanagh	4.74	896	896	900	920	920	942	984	985	1,050	1,177	1,224	1,283	1,347	1,587	1,590	1,977	
Independent	Donal Cullen	4.67	883	887	903	914	914	928	960	962	973	984	999	1,010	1,032	1,074	1,077	1,224	1,258
Fine Gael	Noel McBride	4.38	828	830	833	836	836	847	872	874	879	944	952	972	1,012	1,038	1,040		
Independent	Pascal Blake	3.43	648	649	658	676	676	698	723	723	767	803	853	913	957				
Independent	Charlie McClafferty	3.21	607	608	615	624	624	630	659	661	716	749	772	800					
Fianna Fáil	John Watson	2.54	480	483	489	495	495	505	526	527	547	570	622						
Letterkenny Residents Party	Tom Crossan	2.26	428	429	441	457	457	467	487	488									
Independent	David Fisher	2.20	415	415	429	446	446	465	497	497	522	537							
Fine Gael	Grace Boyle	2.19	413	414	417	422	422	461	490	491	503								
Labour	Christy Galligan	1.99	377	378	381	385	385	419											
Labour	Siobhan McLaughlin	1.79	338	338	352	353	353												
Independent	Peter Cutliffe	1.15	218	219	225														
People Before Profit	Billy Banda	0.97	183	183															
Electorate: 31,406 Valid: 18,901 (60.18%) Spoilt: 163 Quota: 1,719 Turnout: 19,064 (60.70%)

Tom Crossan had been elected for the Letterkenny Residents Party at the 2009 Letterkenny Town Council election. Following his failure to be elected to Donegal County Council, the party dissolved and in December 2014, the acting registrar of political parties proposed to cancel the party's registration. It was not included in the February 2015 register.

=== Stranorlar ===
Stranorlar: 6 seats
Party	Candidate	FPv%	Count								
Party	Candidate	FPv%	1	2	3	4	5	6	7	8	9
Sinn Féin	Gary Doherty	18.51	1,967								
Independent	Frank McBrearty Jnr	14.97	1,591								
Fianna Fáil	Patrick McGowan	13.30	1,414	1,439	1,444	1,452	1,491	1,509	1,619		
Fianna Fáil	Gerry Crawford	11.48	1,220	1,247	1,247	1,265	1,277	1,285	1,332	1,371	1,393
Fine Gael	Martin Harley	10.69	1,136	1,153	1,159	1,165	1,222	1,250	1,315	1,334	1,421
Sinn Féin	Liam Doherty	9.92	1,054	1,356	1,357	1,372	1,390	1,447	1,474	1,482	1,559
Fine Gael	Bert Galbraith	6.53	694	701	705	713	719	720	724	724	730
Independent	Seamus Kee	4.08	430	474	476	482	498	539	549	552	619
Independent	Alan McMenamin	2.94	312	319	330	335	351	395	419	424	
Fianna Fáil	Claudia Kennedy	2.85	303	309	311	313	340	350			
People Before Profit	Charlotte (Charlie) McDyer	2.23	237	247	252	255	262				
Labour	Brian McCrea	2.15	228	234	234	235					
Independent	Tim Meehan	0.36	38	39							
Electorate: 19,396 Valid: 10,628 (54.79%) Spoilt: 147 Quota: 1,519 Turnout: 10,775 (55.55%)

== Changes ==
=== Co-options ===
Party	Outgoing	LEA	Reason	Date	Co-optee
Sinn Féin	Mick Quinn	Letterkenny	Health issues.	27 March 2017	Adrian Glackin
Fianna Fáil	Sean McEniff	Donegal	Death.	21 April 2017	Micheál Naughton
Fine Gael	John Ryan	Inishowen	Work commitments.	15 May 2018	Mickey Doherty
Independent	John Campbell	Donegal	Personal reasons.	8 January 2019	Seamus Maguire
