= 2004 Donegal County Council election =

2004 Irish local government election

- 5 June 2004

All 29 seats on Donegal County Council
- Turnout: 62.3%
	First party	Second party	Third party
Party	Fianna Fáil	Fine Gael	Sinn Féin
Seats won	14	8	4
Seat change	-	-	+4
	Fourth party	Fifth party	Sixth party
Party	Independent Fianna Fáil	Independent	Labour
Seats won	2	1	0
Seat change	-2	-1	-1
- Map showing the area of Donegal County Council
Council control before election
Fianna Fáil
Council control after election
Fianna Fáil

An election to Donegal County Council took place on 5 June 2004 as part of that year's Irish local elections. 29 councillors were elected from six electoral divisions by PR-STV voting for a five-year term of office.

== Results by party ==
Party	Seats	±	First Pref. votes	FPv%	±%
Fianna Fáil	14	-	28,823	40.05	-1.5
Fine Gael	8	-	16,520	22.95	+0.2
Sinn Féin	4	+4	9,725	13.51	+9.1
Independent Fianna Fáil	2	-2	9,356	13.0	
Independent	1	-1	4,744	6.59	
Labour	0	-1	817	1.13	-2.6
Totals	29	-	71,977	100.00	—

== Results by local electoral area ==
- Sitting in italics

=== Donegal ===
Donegal - 6 seats
Party	Candidate	FPv%	Count								
Party	Candidate	FPv%	1	2	3	4	5	6	7	8	9
Sinn Féin	Thomas Pringle*	16.56	2,334								
Fianna Fáil	Sean McEniff*	13.22	1,864	1,886	1,961	1,963	2,061				
Fianna Fáil	Brendan Byrne	10.47	1,476	1,506	1,518	1,619	1,634	1,657	1,678	1,681	1,717
Fine Gael	John Boyle*	9.29	1,309	1,379	1,385	1,504	1,537	1,757	1,779	1,784	1,983
Fianna Fáil	Peter Kennedy*	8.54	1,204	1,226	1,230	1,249	1,263	1,424	1,527	1,535	1,981
Fianna Fáil	Paul Coughlan*	8.27	1,166	1,201	1,210	1,273	1,295	1,345	1,439	1,446	1,631
Independent	Ernan McGettigan	7.00	987	1,018	1,038	1,054	1,125	1,343	1,396	1,399	
Fine Gael	Barry O'Neill	6.30	888	897	943	944	1,001	1,157	1,551	1,566	1,704
Fianna Fáil	Billy Grimes	6.22	877	885	957	971	1,022	1,031			
Fine Gael	Joyce McMullin	6.05	853	866	869	878	902				
Green	Florence Doherty	3.32	468	498	525	531					
Fianna Fáil	Seamus Gillespie	2.60	366	406	407						
Independent Fianna Fáil	Joe Gallagher	2.15	303	313							
Electorate: 22,401 Valid: 14,015 (62.92%) Spoilt: 223 Quota: 2,014 Turnout: 14,318 (63.92%)

Source for Donegal electoral area results.

=== Glenties ===
Glenties - 6 seats
Party	Candidate	FPv%	Count									
Party	Candidate	FPv%	1	2	3	4	5	6	7	8	9	10
Fianna Fáil	Brian O Domhnaill	16.07	2,318									
Sinn Féin	Pearse Doherty	13.12	1,892	1,949	2,040	2,230						
Fine Gael	Terence Slowey*	12.79	1,844	1,845	1,916	1,922	1,925	1,971	2,310			
Fianna Fáil	David Alcorn*	11.62	1,675	1,697	1,737	1,813	1,835	1,850	1,953	1,987	2,189	
Fianna Fáil	Enda Bonner*	9.31	1,343	1,366	1,404	1,449	1,460	1,474	1,591	1,632	1,797	1,871
Fine Gael	Pádraig Doherty*	7.89	1,138	1,162	1,171	1,248	1,286	1,464	1,467	1,470	1,611	1,630
Independent Fianna Fáil	Paddy Kelly*	7.70	1,111	1,178	1,274	1,315	1,323	1,512	1,529	1,536	1,606	1,617
Fianna Fáil	Thomas McDyre	4.85	700	708	779	780	780	789				
Labour	Seamus Rogers	4.73	682	688	776	855	882	912	993	1,063		
Independent	John Greene	4.02	579	589	601							
Fine Gael	John Campbell	4.01	578	604	618	621	623					
Independent Fianna Fáil	Seán O Baoill	2.95	425	431								
Green	Adrian MacFhearraigh	0.94	135	142								
Electorate: 23,611 Valid: 14,420 (61.07%) Spoilt: 247 Quota: 2,061 Turnout: 14,667 (62.12%)

Source for Glenties electoral area results.

=== Inishowen ===
Inishowen - 6 seats
Party	Candidate	FPv%	Count							
Party	Candidate	FPv%	1	2	3	4	5	6	7	8
Sinn Féin	Pádraig Mac Lochlainn	15.36	2,264							
Fine Gael	Bernard McGuinness*	13.43	1,980	1,949	2,040	2,230				
Fianna Fáil	Francis Conaghan*	12.09	1,782	1,796	1,805	1,821	1,909	1,925	1,928	2,017
Fianna Fáil	Rena Donaghey*	11.83	1,744	1,776	1,809	1,865	1,917	1,937	1,940	2,055
Fianna Fáil	Denis McGonigle	10.30	1,518	1,530	1,668	1,692	1,701	1,734	1,738	2,235
Fianna Fáil	Marion McDonald*	8.23	1,213	1,222	1,256	1,293	1,330	1,599	1,649	1,728
Fine Gael	Una Sheridan*	7.21	1,063	1,077	1,087	1,136	1,172	1,243	1,413	1,495
Independent Fianna Fáil	Albert Doherty*	6.74	994	1,009	1,047	1,105	1,344	1,368	1,388	
Fine Gael	Martin Farren	5.83	859	865	870	900	924			
Independent Fianna Fáil	Columba Doherty	3.81	561	572	573	600				
Green	Peter Doran	2.90	427	452	462					
Fianna Fáil	Christina McEleney	2.28	336	343						
Electorate: 26,737 Valid: 14,741 (55.13%) Spoilt: 276 Quota: 2,106 Turnout: 15,017 (56.17%)

Source for Inishowen electoral area results.

=== Letterkenny ===
Letterkenny - 5 seats
Party	Candidate	FPv%	Count							
Party	Candidate	FPv%	1	2	3	4	5	6	7	8
Independent Fianna Fáil	Dessie Larkin*	14.11	1,736	1,758	1,801	2,005	2,090			
Fianna Fáil	Gerry Crawford*	13.95	1,717	1,733	1,751	1,854	1,871	1,928	2,208	
Fianna Fáil	Ciaran Brogan	12.73	1,566	1,580	1,618	1,649	1,707	1,807	1,863	1,894
Fine Gael	Jimmy Harte*	12.45	1,532	1,555	1,607	1,651	1,748	2,124		
Sinn Féin	Tony McDaid	10.44	1,285	1,303	1,314	1,363	1,450	1,496	1,526	1,538
Fianna Fáil	Damien Blake	8.91	1,096	1,107	1,145	1,163	1,239	1,333	1,374	1,394
Independent	Jim Devenney	7.06	869	880	946	985	1,019	1,091		
Fine Gael	[Paddy Gildea	6.01	739	765	831	853	917			
Independent Fianna Fáil	Maureen McLaughlin	4.66	573	586	603					
Green	Neil Clarke	4.42	544	578	623	659				
Progressive Democrats	John Gibbons	3.41	419	431						
Labour	Seán Reilly	1.10	135							
Independent	Johnny Bovaird	0.76	93							
Electorate: 22,762 Valid: 12,304 (54.06%) Spoilt: 160 Quota: 2,051 Turnout: 112,464 (54.76%)

Source for Letterkenny electoral area results.

=== Milford ===
Milford - 3 seats
Party	Candidate	FPv%	Count							
Party	Candidate	FPv%	1	2	3	4	5	6	7	8
Independent Fianna Fáil	Liam Blaney*	17.07	1,577	1,625	1,756	1,792	2,174	2,301	2,578	
Independent	Ian McGarvey	14.37	1,327	1,358	1,378	1,423	1,471	1,679	1,864	1,905
Fine Gael	Noel McBride	12.47	1,152	1,179	1,256	1,681	1,735	1,842	2,062	2,112
Fianna Fáil	Hugh McDaid	11.32	1,046	1,118	1,144	1,219	1,430	1,692	1,869	1,900
Sinn Féin	Donal Cullen	10.10	933	958	1,044	1,076	1,153	1,338		
Independent	Daniel O'Donnell	9.62	889	910	951	1,012	1,150			
Fine Gael	Tommy Ryan	8.38	774	779	785					
Independent Fianna Fáil	Michael McBride	8.25	762	767	895	983				
Independent Fianna Fáil	Joseph Cullen	5.56	514	535						
Fianna Fáil	Kenneth Bradley	2.85	263							
Electorate: 13,597 Valid: 9,237 (67.93%) Spoilt: 135 Quota: 2,310 Turnout: 9,372 (68.93%)

Source for Milford electoral area results.

=== Stranorlar ===
Stranorlar - 3 seats
Party	Candidate	FPv%	Count			
Party	Candidate	FPv%	1	2	3	4
Fianna Fáil	Alice Bonner*	28.73	2,063			
Fianna Fáil	Patrick McGowan*	20.74	1,489	1,632	1,770	2,062
Fine Gael	J.J. Reid*	15.68	1,126	1,156	1,502	1,668
Sinn Féin	Tom Dignam	14.15	1,016	1,040	1,112	1,349
Independent Fianna Fáil	Peter Carlin	11.14	800	830	918	
Fine Gael	Martin Harley	9.55	686	726		
Electorate: 11,989 Valid: 7,180 (59.89%) Spoilt: 131 Quota: 1,796 Turnout: 7,311 (60.98%)

Source for Stranorlar electoral area results.
