= 2009 Letterkenny Town Council election =

Part of the 2009 Irish local elections

← 2004	5 June 2009	Abolished in 2014 →

All 9 seats on Letterkenny Town Council
	First party	Second party	Third party
Party	Fianna Fáil	Fine Gael	Sinn Féin
Seats won	4	1	1
	Fourth party	Fifth party
Party	LRP	Independent
Seats won	1	2
Council control before election
Fianna Fáil
Council control after election
FG-SF-LRP-Ind coalition

An election to all 9 seats on Letterkenny Town Council took place on 5 June 2009 as part of the 2009 Irish local elections. Councillors were elected in Letterkenny for a five-year term of office on the electoral system of proportional representation by means of the single transferable vote (PR-STV).

It was the last election for the town council, as all town councils in Ireland were abolished in 2014.

== Results by party ==
Party	Seats	±	FPv.	FPv%	±%
Fianna Fáil	4	Steady	2,307	36.77	▲0.97
Fine Gael	1	Steady	1,406	22.41	▲4.69
Sinn Féin	1	▲1	469	7.48	▼0.02
Letterkenny Residents Party	1	New	417	6.65	New
Labour	0	Steady	192	3.06	▲1.87
Green	0	▼1	82	1.31	▼3.36
Independent	2	▲1	1,403	22.36	▲4.66
Totals	9	-	6,274	100%	—

The Letterkenny Residents Party was registered in 2008 to contest local elections only. Following the dissolution of Letterkenny Town Council in 2014, Crossan unsuccessfully contested the Letterkenny local electoral area for the party. The party was deregistered in 2015.

== Results ==
*: Outgoing councillor elected in 2004.

9 Seats
Party	Candidate	FPv%	Count																
Party	Candidate	FPv%	1	2	3	4	5	6	7	8	9	10	11	12	13	14	15	16	17
Fianna Fáil	Ciaran Brogan	12.44	781																
Fianna Fáil	Dessie Larkin	9.58	601	634															
Independent	Jimmy Harte	7.59	476	483	485	486	493	501	506	519	530	544	571	594	623	662			
Sinn Féin	Gerry McMonagle	7.48	469	477	477	477	484	489	494	498	514	516	550	555	572	597	598	598	598
Fine Gael	Jimmy Kavanagh	7.44	467	472	472	472	476	479	483	490	497	507	533	562	616	665			
Fianna Fáil	Tadgh Culbert	7.27	456	490	493	495	498	504	514	529	538	540	546	600	620	644			
Letterkenny Residents Party	Tom Crossan	6.65	417	424	424	425	428	439	447	458	487	499	523	561	591	616	619	626	629
Independent	Jim Lynch	5.66	355	357	358	358	369	373	382	395	414	417	434	458	479	499	499	503	503
Fianna Fáil	Victor Fisher	5.56	349	371	376	378	391	394	409	416	424	444	455	478	500	536	538	544	547
Fine Gael	Josie Murray	4.43	278	281	284	284	289	293	295	295	306	313	334	348	387				
Fine Gael	Paddy Gildea	4.22	265	271	272	272	276	283	288	296	296	342	345	362	405	465	487	494	495
Independent	P.J. Blake	3.83	240	243	243	243	245	245	246	159	264	275	282						
Fine Gael	Frank Larkin	3.79	238	244	245	245	250	254	258	262	269	289	311	334					
Labour	Siobhan McLaughlin	3.06	192	194	196	196	202	208	210	214	224	232							
Fine Gael	Michael Abiola-Phillips	2.52	158	160	176	176	176	180	181	183	193								
Independent	Robert Brix Lloyd	2.17	136	137	138	138	138	147	151	154									
Independent	Peter Cutliffe	1.90	119	120	121	121	122	122	124										
Green	Frank Gallagher	1.31	82	83	83	83	83												
Fianna Fáil	P.J. Doherty	1.29	81	86	88	88	90	91											
Independent	Ian McGarvey	1.23	77	79	79	79													
Fianna Fáil	Setlla Oladapo	0.62	39	40															
Electorate: 10,905 Valid: 6,274 (57.53%) Spoilt: 64 Quota: 628 Turnout: 6,338 (58.12%)

Preceded by 2004 Letterkenny Town Council election	Letterkenny Town Council elections	Succeeded by Abolished
