= 2024 Donegal County Council election =

Part of the 2024 Irish local elections

- 7 June 2024

All 37 seats on Donegal County Council 19 seats needed for a majority
- Turnout: 54.7% ▲0.3%
	First party	Second party	Third party
Party	Fianna Fáil	Sinn Féin	100% Redress
Last election	12	10	Did not exist
Seats won	10	10	4
Seat change	▼2	Steady	▲4
	Fourth party	Fifth party	Sixth party
Party	Fine Gael	Labour	Independent
Last election	6	1	8
Seats won	3	1	9
Seat change	▼3	Steady	▲1
- Results by Local Electoral Area

An election to all 37 seats on Donegal County Council was held on 7 June 2024 as part of the 2024 Irish local elections. County Donegal is divided into 7 local electoral areas (LEAs) to elect councillors for a five-year term of office on the electoral system of proportional representation by means of the single transferable vote (PR-STV). Candidates must be nominated by 12 noon on Saturday, 18 May 2024.

== Recounts ==
On the 12th count for the Letterkenny LEA, Mary T. Sweeney called for a full recount, as Tomás Seán Devine's transfers narrowly gave Kevin Bradley 5 votes over Sweeney, and would have resulted in her elimination.

== Retiring incumbents ==
The following councillors did not seek re-election:

Constituency	Departing Councillor	Party
Donegal	Tom Conaghan	Independent
Buncrana	Nicholas Crossan	Independent
Lifford-Stranorlar	Liam Doherty	Sinn Féin
Buncrana	Rena Donaghey	Fianna Fáil

== Results by party ==
Party	First-preference votes			Seats				
Party	Votes	% FPv	Swing (pp)	Cand.	2019	Out.	Elected 2024	Change
Fianna Fáil	17,459	22.76	▼6.59	15	12	12	10	▼2
Sinn Féin	16,801	21.90	▲2.53	18	10	10	10	Steady
100% Redress	7,400	9.65	New	6	New	New	4	▲4
Fine Gael	8,068	10.52	▼7.98	9	6	4	3	▼3
Labour	1,514	1.97	▼0.71	3	1	1	1	Steady
Aontú	2,251	2.93	▼0.21	6	0	0	0	Steady
The Irish People	1,050	1.37	New	4	New	New	New	Steady
Green	320	0.42	New	3	New	New	New	Steady
Independent	21,855	28.49	▲2.31	27	8	10	9	▲1
Total Valid	76,718	98.97						
Spoilt votes	800	1.03						
Total	77,518	100	—	91	37	37	37	Steady
Registered voters/Turnout	142,419	54.43						

== Results by LEA ==
*: Outgoing councillor elected in 2019.
†: Outgoing councillor coopted subsequent to the 2019 election.

=== Buncrana ===
Buncrana: 5 seats
Party	Candidate	FPv%	Count							
Party	Candidate	FPv%	1	2	3	4	5	6	7	8
Sinn Féin	Jack Murray	24.82	2,248							
100% Redress	Joy Beard	17.52	1,587							
Fianna Fáil	Paul Canning	13.99	1,267	1,302	1,308	1,319	1,341	1,367	1,463	1,492
Sinn Féin	Terry Crossan	10.74	973	1,102	1,114	1,125	1,152	1,173	1,203	1,243
Fianna Fáil	Fionán Bradley	9.35	847	936	946	948	1,000	1,075	1,315	1,424
The Irish People	Kim McMenamin	6.26	567	616	629	653	692	747	793	
Fine Gael	Peter McLaughlin	5.50	499	566	574	576	601	660		
Sinn Féin	Niamh McGuinness	5.30	480	760	772	778	801	846	889	972
Independent	Adrian McMyler	2.77	251	312	319	334	358			
Aontú	Liam Mulligan	1.76	159	167	170	176				
Independent	Eamon McGee	0.99	90	98	101					
Green	Jason Le Masurier	0.98	89	101	104	105				
Electorate: 17,578 Valid: 9,057 Spoilt: 141 Quota: 1,510 Turnout: 9,198 (52.33%)

=== Carndonagh ===
Carndonagh: 4 seats
Party	Candidate	FPv%	Count						
Party	Candidate	FPv%	1	2	3	4	5	6	7
100% Redress	Ali Farren	28.38	2,253						
Fianna Fáil	Martin McDermott	26.06	2,069						
Labour	Martin Farren	12.61	1,001	1,084	1,157	1,168	1,182	1,257	1,391
Sinn Féin	Albert Doherty	12.55	996	1,268	1,430	1,441	1,470	1,942	
Fine Gael	John McGuinness	9.27	736	835	997	1,007	1,014	1,116	1,171
Independent	Paul Barry McKinney	4.71	374	481	537	549	674		
Sinn Féin	Toni Devine	3.30	262	304	316	329	331		
The Irish People	Donal McKinney	2.43	193	247	260	260			
Green	Michael White	0.69	55	63	66				
Electorate: 15,041 Valid: 7,939 Spoilt: 70 Quota: 1,588 Turnout: 8,009 (53.25%)

=== Donegal ===
Donegal: 6 seats
Party	Candidate	FPv%	Count										
Party	Candidate	FPv%	1	2	3	4	5	6	7	8	9	10	11
Fianna Fáil	Micheál Naughton	13.30	1,847	1,851	1,851	1,921	1,947	1,956	1,981	2,151			
Sinn Féin	Noel Jordan	11.38	1,580	1,581	1,593	1,601	1,629	1,811	1,829	1,868	1,875	2,352	
Sinn Féin	Michael McMahon	10.69	1,484	1,502	1,505	1,563	1,584	1,613	1,840	1,852	1,856	1,895	1,931
Independent	Jimmy Brogan	9.76	1,356	1,365	1,398	1,404	1,466	1,528	1,557	1,705	1,717	1,950	2,059
Independent	Pauric Kennedy	9.53	1,324	1,337	1,346	1,353	1,384	1,390	1,410	1,417	1,423		
Fine Gael	Barry Sweeny	9.22	1,281	1,286	1,286	1,342	1,354	1,360	1,440	1,448	1,452	1,519	1,532
Fine Gael	Manus Boyle	9.17	1,274	1,274	1,292	1,294	1,312	1,352	1,355	1,554	1,595	1,706	1,751
Independent	Niamh Kennedy	7.93	1,102	1,119	1,177	1,197	1,237	1,321	1,357	1,588	1,622	1,941	2,067
Fianna Fáil	Martin Hegarty	5.59	776	776	785	809	817	891	894				
Independent	Diarmuid Doherty	3.59	498	515	521	552	572	573					
Sinn Féin	Linda Boyle	3.33	462	462	494	497	510						
Fianna Fáil	Claudia Kennedy	2.18	301	302	303								
Aontú	Patrick Brogan	2.02	280	300	311	313							
Independent	Derek Vial	1.33	184	201									
The Irish People	John Molloy	1.01	140										
Electorate: 24,597 Valid: 13,889 Spoilt: 108 Quota: 1,985 Turnout: 13,997 (56.91%)

=== Glenties ===
Glenties: 6 seats
Party	Candidate	FPv%	Count									
Party	Candidate	FPv%	1	2	3	4	5	6	7	8	9	10
Independent	Micheál Cholm Mac Giolla Easbuig	16.13	2,125									
Independent	Michael McClafferty	14.31	1,885									
Fianna Fáil	Anthony Molloy	10.70	1,409	1,417	1,420	1,435	1,500	1,531	1,707	1,903		
Sinn Féin	Brian Carr	7.75	1,021	1,029	1,032	1,043	1,052	1,069	1,280	1,333	1,358	1,587
Sinn Féin	John Shéamais Ó Fearraigh	7.36	970	1,004	1,010	1,033	1,068	1,119	1,122	1,146	1,381	1,727
100% Redress	Denis McGee	6.75	889	937	998	1,028	1,088	1,240	1,280	1,315	1,521	1,633
Sinn Féin	Kellie Rodgers	6.06	798	843	850	924	942	959	981	1,116	1,154	
Independent	Jonathan Stewart	6.03	794	843	860	861	876	915	971	1,158	1,240	1,437
Fine Gael	Joseph Molloy	5.70	751	773	774	798	826	838	855	896		
Fianna Fáil	John Reilly	4.95	652	666	666	705	768	772	791			
Independent	Kevin O'Donnell	4.41	581	586	590	601	601	628				
Aontú	Michael Harkin	3.50	461	464	493	497	508					
Fianna Fáil	Anne Marie Rodgers	2.80	369	378	386	397						
Labour	Séimi Ó Dubhthaigh	2.18	287	303	308							
Independent	Anthony Matthew Doohan	0.81	106	108								
Independent	Ann Sweeney	0.58	76	78								
Electorate: 24,479 Valid: 13,174 Spoilt: 123 Quota: 1,883 Turnout: 13,297 (54.32%)

=== Letterkenny ===
Letterkenny: 7 seats
Party	Candidate	FPv%	Count													
Party	Candidate	FPv%	1	2	3	4	5	6	7	8	9	10	11	12	13	14
Fianna Fáil	Donál "Mandy" Kelly	14.13	1,843													
Fianna Fáil	Ciaran Brogan	10.80	1,407	1,438	1,441	1,448	1,451	1,467	1,478	1,514	1,563	1,607	1,619	1,621	1,822	
100% Redress	Tomás Seán Devine	9.89	1,288	1,301	1,325	1,339	1,393	1,422	1,443	1,532	1,619	1,680				
Fine Gael	Jimmy Kavanagh	9.58	1,249	1,270	1,274	1,302	1,306	1,353	1,360	1,420	1,475	1,510	1,519	1,525	1,685	
Independent	Michael McBride	8.45	1,101	1,139	1,149	1,157	1,159	1,178	1,249	1,277	1,336	1,365	1,382	1,388	1,572	1,615
Sinn Féin	Gerry McMonagle	7.46	970	980	982	986	990	1,011	1,093	1,139	1,206	1,710				
Fianna Fáil	Donal Coyle	7.29	950	969	973	979	979	992	996	1,017	1,066	1,105	1,113	1,116	1,212	1,266
Aontú	Mary T. Sweeney	6.03	785	798	807	815	876	888	897	918	954	992	1,010	1,013	1,129	1,150
Independent	Kevin Bradley	5.63	731	750	758	764	771	792	806	859	945	979	996	1,008		
Independent	Declan Jordan	4.77	621	631	637	649	663	673	684	737						
Sinn Féin	Sandra Haughey	4.75	620	626	629	636	640	655	774	826	880					
Independent	Thoiba Ahmed	3.38	439	447	454	497	499	537	543							
Sinn Féin	Ulick Hughes	2.65	344	361	362	364	365	370								
Labour	Michael McLaughlin	1.74	226	229	229	254	254									
Green	Nuala Carr	1.35	176	178	178											
The Irish People	Ann McCloskey	1.15	150	150	180	182										
Independent	Vincent J. Bradley	0.73	98	99												
Independent	Selina O'Donnell	0.23	30	31												
Electorate: 25,643 Valid: 13,029 Spoilt: 146 Quota: 1,629 Turnout: 13,175 (51.38%)

=== Lifford–Stranorlar ===
Lifford–Stranorlar: 6 seats
Party	Candidate	FPv%	Count							
Party	Candidate	FPv%	1	2	3	4	5	6	7	8
Independent	Martin Scanlon	12.37	1,410	1,458	1,522	1,525	1,732			
Fine Gael	Martin Harley	11.06	1,261	1,285	1,482	1,483	1,552	1,566	1,628	
Independent	Frank McBrearty Jnr	10.52	1,199	1,253	1,278	1,338	1,493	1,514	1,939	
Sinn Féin	Gary Doherty	10.47	1,193	1,215	1,262	1,498	1,629			
Fianna Fáil	Patrick McGowan	10.27	1,171	1,198	1,271	1,282	1,358	1,369	1,474	1,508
Fianna Fáil	Gerry Crawford	8.68	990	1,010	1,041	1,112	1,163	1,168	1,213	1,240
Independent	Niall McConnell	7.72	880	971	999	1,029	1,104	1,127		
100% Redress	Charles Ward	7.72	880	939	958	985				
Sinn Féin	Dakota Nic Mheanman	7.36	839	874	894	1,057	1,193	1,222	1,321	1,357
Sinn Féin	Tony McDaid	5.48	625	638	642					
Fine Gael	Garvan Connolly	4.54	518	533						
Aontú	Rebecca McDaid	3.81	434							
Electorate: 21,903 Valid: 11,400 Spoilt: 133 Quota: 1,629 Turnout: 11,533 (52.65%)

=== Milford ===
Milford: 3 seats
Party	Candidate	FPv%	Count				
Party	Candidate	FPv%	1	2	3	4	5
Independent	Declan Meehan	21.13	1,739	1,762	1,886	2,074	
Fianna Fáil	Liam Blaney	18.99	1,563	1,598	1,713	1,802	2,051
Independent	Pauric McGarvey	16.90	1,391	1,446	1,525	1,664	1,947
Independent	John O'Donnell	16.09	1,324	1,344	1,407	1,438	1,671
Sinn Féin	Maria Doherty	11.35	934	951	996	1,088	
100% Redress	Éamonn Jackson	6.10	502	564	603		
Fine Gael	Aaron Sweeney	6.08	500	515			
Independent	Vincent J. Bradley	1.76	145				
Aontú	Kathleen Deeney	1.60	132				
Electorate: 13,178 Valid: 8,230 Spoilt: 79 Quota: 2,058 Turnout: 8,309 (63.05%)

== Changes ==
=== Co-options ===
Party	Outgoing	LEA	Reason	Date	Co-optee
Fine Gael	Manus Boyle	Donegal	Elected to the 27th Seanad at the 2025 Seanad election	28 March 2025	Michael Boyle
