= 2004 Letterkenny Town Council election =

Part of the 2004 Irish local elections

← 1999	5 June 2004	2009 →

All 9 seats to Letterkenny Town Council
	First party	Second party	Third party
Party	Fianna Fáil	Fine Gael	Green
Seats won	4	1	1
	Fourth party	Fifth party	Sixth party
Party	Independent Fianna Fáil	Sinn Féin	Independent
Seats won	1	1	1
Council control before election
Fianna Fáil
Council control after election
Fianna Fáil

An election to Letterkenny Town Council took place on 5 June 2004 as part of that year's Irish local elections. 9 councillors were elected by PR-STV voting for a five-year term of office.

== Results by party ==
Party	Seats	±	FPv.	FPv%	±%
Fianna Fáil	4	▲1	2,116	35.80	▲4.38
Fine Gael	1	Steady	1,047	17.72	▲7.98
Independent Fianna Fáil	1	Steady	721	12.20	▲5.07
Sinn Féin	1	▲1	443	7.50	▲4.23
Green	1	New	276	4.67	New
Progressive Democrats	0	New	126	2.13	New
Labour	0	▼1	70	1.19	▼9.56
Socialist Party	0	New	64	1.08	New
Independent	1	▼2	1,046	17.70	▼19.29
Totals	9	-	5,909	100%	—

== Results ==
*: Outgoing councillor elected in 1999.

9 Seats
Party	Candidate	FPv%	Count															
Party	Candidate	FPv%	1	2	3	4	5	6	7	8	9	10	11	12	13	14	15	16
Fianna Fáil	Ciaran Brogan	13.83	817															
Independent Fianna Fáil	Dessie Larkin	12.20	721															
Fianna Fáil	Victor Fisher	8.38	495	532	546	547	549	556	566	576	580	607						
Sinn Féin	Gerry McMonagle	7.50	443	469	477	484	490	496	501	509	514	533	540	541	541	573	577	577
Independent	Jim Lynch	7.24	428	435	449	457	463	475	491	507	516	545	581	585	588	634		
Fianna Fáil	Damien Blake	7.19	425	471	483	484	489	505	521	534	547	571	604					
Fine Gael	Jimmy Harte	6.85	405	417	426	428	438	440	448	463	502	523	589	590	592			
Fianna Fáil	Jean Crossan	5.20	307	335	342	343	343	352	359	366	371	388	415	417	420	487	499	500
Independent	P.J. Blake	4.96	293	307	317	321	321	328	335	351	353	366	380	384	385			
Green	Neil Clarke	4.67	276	285	291	311	329	337	353	369	377	390	406	408	409	450	455	455
Fine Gael	Jimmy Kavanagh	4.55	269	275	270	280	284	286	298	312	333	346	399	399	402	449	455	455
Fine Gael	Charlie McClafferty	3.91	231	242	247	248	252	254	256	263	291	310						
Independent	Peter Patton	3.37	199	212	240	240	241	242	242	250	259							
Fine Gael	Marian Metcalfe	2.40	142	146	147	149	153	153	164	167								
Independent	Peter Cutliffe	2.13	126	133	139	141	143	143	147									
Progressive Democrats	Khris Veldman	2.13	126	127	131	133	135	135										
Fianna Fáil	Patrick Gallagher	1.22	72	77	79	80	82											
Labour	Seán Reilly	1.19	70	70	70	74												
Socialist Party	Francis McCafferty	1.08	64	64	64													
Electorate: 11,593 Valid: 5,909 (50.97%) Spoilt: 68 Quota: 591 Turnout: 5,977 (51.56%)

Preceded by 1999 Letterkenny Town Council election	Letterkenny Town Council elections	Succeeded by 2009 Letterkenny Town Council election
