= 1999 Donegal County Council election =

Part of the 1999 Irish local elections

- 10 June 1999

All 29 seats on Donegal County Council
	First party	Second party	Third party
Party	Fianna Fáil	Fine Gael	Independent Fianna Fáil
Seats won	14	8	4
Seat change	+3	-1	0
	Fourth party	Fifth party	Sixth party
Party	Labour	Independent	Sinn Féin
Seats won	1	2	0
Seat change	0	0	-1
	Seventh party
Party	Workers' Party
Seats won	0
Seat change	-1
- Map showing the area of Donegal County Council
Council control before election
Fianna Fáil
Council control after election
Fianna Fáil

An election to Donegal County Council took place on 10 June 1999 as part of that year's Irish local elections. 29 councillors were elected from six local electoral areas on the system of proportional representation by means of the single transferable vote (PR-STV) for a five-year term of office.

== Results by party ==
Party	Seats	±	First Pref. votes	FPv%	±%
Fianna Fáil	14	+3	27,090	41.45	
Fine Gael	8	-1	14,931	22.85	
Independent Fianna Fáil	4	0	9,277	14.20	
Labour	1	0	3,327	5.09	
Independent	2	0	6,966	10.66	
Sinn Féin	0	-1	2,844	4.35	
Workers' Party	0	-1	0	0.00	N/A
Totals	29	0	65,353	100.00	—

== Results by local electoral area ==
- Sitting in italics

=== Donegal ===
Donegal - 6 seats
Party	Candidate	FPv%	Count										
Party	Candidate	FPv%	1	2	3	4	5	6	7	8	9	10	11
Fianna Fáil	Declan McHugh	14.47	1,915										
Fianna Fáil	Mary Coughlan TD*	12.27	1,623	1,636	1,663	1,678	1,722	1,726	1,749	1,871	2,040		
Fianna Fáil	Sean McEniff*	11.34	1,500	1,558	1,606	1,675	1,688	1,699	1,709	1,750	1,788	1,801	1,880
Fianna Fáil	Peter Kennedy*	8.61	1,139	1,140	1,172	1,175	1,272	1,273	1,281	1,396	1,663	1,722	1,915
Fine Gael	John Boyle	8.25	1,091	1,092	1,102	1,113	1,217	1,217	1,412	1,467	1,564	1,578	1,729
Independent	Thomas Pringle	7.21	954	962	1,002	1,004	1,015	1,015	1,143	1,161	1,211	1,213	1,488
Fianna Fáil	James McBrearty*	7.32	969	970	979	982	986	986	1,158	1,166	1,186	1,191	
Fine Gael	Frank O'Kelly*	5.25	695	707	710	881	1,002	1,006	1,086	1,229	1,300	1,313	1,355
Fine Gael	Michael McIntyre	5.06	670	672	680	688	721	722					
Labour	Manus Brennan	4.81	636	640	665	676	753	754	764	902			
Progressive Democrats	Keith Anderson	4.80	635	638	649	667	722	724	737				
Fine Gael	Julie Mundy	4.36	577	578	599	616							
Fine Gael	Barney McLaughlin	2.73	361	370	371								
Sinn Féin	Niall Keenan	2.15	285	319									
Republican Sinn Féin	John O'Neill	1.36	180										
Electorate: 20,128 Valid: 13,230 (65.73%) Spoilt: 209 Quota: 1,891 Turnout: 13,439 (66.77%)

=== Glenties ===
Glenties - 6 seats
Party	Candidate	FPv%	Count									
Party	Candidate	FPv%	1	2	3	4	5	6	7	8	9	10
Fianna Fáil	David Alcorn	17.45	2,268									
Independent Fianna Fáil	Paddy Kelly*	13.30	1,729	1,740	1,756	1,758	1,825	1,831	1,942			
Fianna Fáil	Senator Enda Bonner	11.56	1,503	1,649	1,660	1,753	1,975					
Fine Gael	Charles Bennett*	8.89	1,156	1,163	1,167	1,199	1,206	1,208	1,228	1,470	1,472	1,541
Independent	Tom Gildea TD	8.27	1,075	1,098	1,150	1,184	1,208	1,209	1,291	1,548	1,555	1,656
Fine Gael	Maureen Doohan*	7.58	985	991	1,019	1,028	1,051	1,052	1,112	1,126	1,130	
Labour	Seamus Rogers*	7.09	922	995	1,019	1,121	1,139	1,146	1,268	1,332	1,344	1,449
Fine Gael	Pádraig Doherty	5.71	742	756	765	829	912	921	1,113	1,126	1,135	1,508
Fianna Fáil	Francis Brennan*	5.80	754	776	779	783	824	903	924			
Independent	Fred Coll*	5.04	655	678	691	721	820	832				
Fianna Fáil	Vincent Breslin	4.69	610	637	647	652						
Fine Gael	John Murray	3.00	390	444	447							
Independent	Alice (Breezy) Kelly	0.82	107	108								
Green	Mary Kelly	0.79	103	106								
Electorate: 22,054 Valid: 12,999 (58.94%) Spoilt: 201 Quota: 1,858 Turnout: 13,200 (59.85%)

=== Inishowen ===
Inishowen - 6 seats
Party	Candidate	FPv%	Count								
Party	Candidate	FPv%	1	2	3	4	5	6	7	8	9
Fianna Fáil	Cecilia Keaveney TD*	17.12	2,199								
Fine Gael	Bernard McGuinness*	12.31	1,581	1,616	1,650	1,688	1,747	2,124			
Fianna Fáil	Rena Donaghey	11.58	1,488	1,523	1,538	1,593	1,758	1,782	1,788	2,027	
Fianna Fáil	Francis Conaghan	9.91	1,273	1,327	1,339	1,404	1,516	1,547	1,556	1,663	1,696
Independent Fianna Fáil	Albert Doherty	8.63	1,109	1,133	1,158	1,393	1,441	1,502	1,517	1,666	1,695
Fianna Fáil	Denis McGonigle*	8.57	1,101	1,206	1,240	1,247	1,274	1,313	1,321	1,427	1,453
Sinn Féin	Jim Ferry*	8.23	889	905	927	991	1,084	1,137	1,147		
Fine Gael	Jim Sheridan	7.21	829	843	859	882	1,007	1,095	1,286	1,423	1,468
Fine Gael	Martin Farren	5.93	762	800	817	852	900				
Independent	Nicholas Crossan	5.81	747	757	772	844					
Independent Fianna Fáil	Columba Doherty	5.01	644	666	674						
Labour	Sheila Rogers	1.75	225	343							
Electorate: 23,072 Valid: 12,845 (55.68%) Spoilt: 202 Quota: 1,836 Turnout: 13,049 (56.56%)

=== Letterkenny ===
Letterkenny - 5 seats
Party	Candidate	FPv%	Count					
Party	Candidate	FPv%	1	2	3	4	5	6
Fianna Fáil	Bernard McGlinchey*	16.71	1,891					
Labour	Seán Maloney*	11.26	1,275	1,339	1,362	1,439	1,566	1,656
Fianna Fáil	Gerry Crawford	11.17	1,264	1,282	1,494	1,610	1,810	2,023
Fine Gael	Jimmy Harte	10.99	1,244	1,406	1,520	1,551	1,703	1,840
Independent	Jim Devenney*	10.86	1,229	1,264	1,288	1,316	1,359	1,462
Independent Fianna Fáil	Dessie Larkin	8.77	993	1,045	1,056	1,141	1,299	1,713
Independent Fianna Fáil	Danny Harkin*	8.67	981	1,005	1,079	1,136	1,205	
Fianna Fáil	John Watson	7.05	798	827	841	923		
Sinn Féin	Gerry McMonagle	5.49	621	631	657			
Independent	Tony Friel	5.19	587	593				
Fine Gael	Paddy Gildea	3.85	436					
Electorate: 19,658 Valid: 11,319 (57.58%) Spoilt: 145 Quota: 1,887 Turnout: 11,464 (58.32%)

=== Milford ===
Milford - 3 seats
Party	Candidate	FPv%	Count			
Party	Candidate	FPv%	1	2	3	4
Independent Fianna Fáil	Niall Blaney	24.25	2,001	2,090		
Fine Gael	Joe McHugh	20.14	1,662	1,716	2,018	2,288
Fianna Fáil	Noel McGinley*	18.78	1,550	1,611	1,657	1,862
Independent Fianna Fáil	Anne O'Donnell*	15.21	1,255	1,349	1,374	1,559
Independent	Ian McGarvey	11.32	934	948	1,010	
Fine Gael	Caroline Carron	5.76	475	480		
Sinn Féin	Martin McGroddy	4.54	375			
Electorate: 11,897 Valid: 8,252 (69.36%) Spoilt: 90 Quota: 2,064 Turnout: 8,342 (70.12%)

=== Stranorlar ===
Stranorlar - 3 seats
Party	Candidate	FPv%	Count					
Party	Candidate	FPv%	1	2	3	4	5	6
Fianna Fáil	Patrick McGowan	19.13	1,283	1,313	1,335	1,485	1,571	1,738
Fianna Fáil	Alice Bonner	16.78	1,125	1,175	1,194	1,286	1,386	1,562
Fine Gael	J.J. Reid*	14.43	968	1,036	1,183	1,259	1,582	1,658
Fianna Fáil	Peter Carlin	12.48	837	854	864	942	984	1,096
Independent	Aubrey Barclay	10.11	678	716	753	789		
Sinn Féin	Tom Dignam	10.05	674	692	702	806	823	
Independent Fianna Fáil	Eamonn Harkin	8.43	565	577	647			
Fine Gael	Majella McMullan	4.58	307	331				
Labour	Michael J. O'Boyle	4.01	269					
Electorate: 10,888 Valid: 6,706 (61.59%) Spoilt: 71 Quota: 1,677 Turnout: 6,777 (62.24%)
