= 1999 Letterkenny Urban District Council election =

Part of the 1999 Irish local elections

← 1994	10 June 1999	2004 →

All 9 seats to Letterkenny Urban District Council
	First party	Second party	Third party
Party	Fianna Fáil	Fine Gael	Labour
Seats won	3	1	1
	Fourth party	Fifth party
Party	Independent Fianna Fáil	Independent
Seats won	1	3
Council control before election
Fianna Fáil
Elected Council control
Fianna Fáil

An election to Letterkenny Urban District Council took place on 10 June 1999 as part of that year's Irish local elections. 9 councillors were elected by PR-STV voting for a five-year term of office.

== Results by party ==
Party	Seats	±	First Pref. votes	FPv%	±%
Fianna Fáil	3				
Fine Gael	1				
Independent Fianna Fáil	1				
Labour	1				
Green	0				
Sinn Féin	0				
Independent	3				
Totals	9	-		100%	—

== Results ==
*: Outgoing councillor elected in 1994.

9 Seats
Party	Candidate	FPv%	Count																
Party	Candidate	FPv%	1	2	3	4	5	6	7	8	9	10	11	12	13	14	15	16	17
Fianna Fáil	Terry McEniff	9.26	522	523	525	526	531	533	545	545	553	562	563	563	574				
Labour	Seán Maloney*	8.69	490	493	501	511	518	525	552	569									
Independent	Jim Lynch*	8.36	471	471	474	490	503	510	522	534	547	572							
Independent	Ciaran Brogan	8.30	468	472	482	484	484	498	506	509	522	531	531	531	590				
Fianna Fáil	Victor Fisher*	7.70	434	435	438	442	448	454	465	470	484	497	498	498	513	533	537	542	614
Independent Fianna Fáil	Dessie Larkin*	7.13	402	403	404	407	415	438	443	454	476	491	491	491	505	597			
Fianna Fáil	Jean Crossan*	6.41	361	362	366	369	377	384	391	394	400	412	412	412	429	439	445	450	478
Independent	P.J. Blake*	6.02	339	339	355	361	365	374	383	392	403	432	434	434	443	461	469	477	569
Fine Gael	Jimmy Harte*	5.75	324	325	328	331	353	359	364	427	441	463	464	465	471	486	492	492	515
Fianna Fáil	Tadhg Culbert*	4.10	231	231	238	241	241	246	249	251	259	280	281	281	293	306	308	312	
Fianna Fáil	Patch Crossan	3.96	223	224	227	231	233	239	243	250	276	298	300	302	310	329	336	337	375
Sinn Féin	Martin Brogan	3.27	184	192	199	201	201	201	204	205	214	217	217	217					
Independent	Jimmy Kavanagh	3.18	179	182	186	187	188	191	193	197	204								
Independent	Joseph Gallagher	3.16	178	179	180	186	191	201	202	206	213	219	219	221	235				
Independent	Tommy Ronaghan	2.80	158	159	160	164	167	173	180	181									
Fine Gael	Paddy Gildea	2.25	127	127	127	139	150	155	157										
Labour	Karen McGlinchey	2.05	116	118	119	125	128	129											
Independent	Donal Coyle	2.05	116	117	119	120	121												
Fine Gael	Doreen Sheridan Kennedy	1.74	98	98	98	100													
Independent	John Devine	1.62	91	92	95														
Independent	Frank Brogan	1.51	85	88															
Republican Sinn Féin	John MacElhinney	0.69	39																
Electorate: 10,005 Valid: 5,636 (56.33%) Spoilt: 56 Quota: 564 Turnout: 5,692 (56.89%)

Preceded by 1994 Letterkenny Town Council election	Letterkenny Town Council elections	Succeeded by 2004 Letterkenny Town Council election
