= Terry McEniff =

Irish businessman & politician

- Occupation: Hotelier
- Known for: Business and politics

Terry McEniff is an Irish businessman and former politician and mayor from County Donegal. His business ventures and political exploits have often featured in national publications, such as the Irish Independent, Irish Examiner or The Irish Times.

== Business ==
McEniff owns the "popular" and "high profile" Mount Errigal Hotel in Letterkenny.

== Politics ==
McEniff is the son of hotelier Sean McEniff - who at his death in 2017 was the longest-serving councillor in Ireland, having first been elected 50 years earlier. His uncle Brian - another councillor - led Donegal to their first All-Ireland Senior Football Championship title in 1992.

Terry McEniff has himself served as a councillor. He was elected for Fianna Fáil at the 1999 Letterkenny Town Council election, coming in behind Ciaran Brogan and poll topper Seán Maloney of Labour - but ahead of Dessie Larkin of Independent Fianna Fáil and Fine Gael candidate Jimmy Harte. In 2002, he became Mayor of Letterkenny - less than 24 hours before his younger sister, Elizabeth McIntyre nee McEniff, became Mayor of Bundoran. He objected to the government's lack of support for The Gathering Ireland 2013.

== Personal life ==
Married to Loretta, McEniff is the father of twins and supports Naomh Adhamhnáin.
