= 2019 Donegal County Council election =

Part of the 2019 Irish local elections

- 24 May 2019

All 37 seats on Donegal County Council 19 seats needed for a majority
- Turnout: 54.4% ▼3.7%
	First party	Second party	Third party
Party	Fianna Fáil	Sinn Féin	Fine Gael
Seats won	12	10	6
Seat change	▲1	▲1	Steady
	Fourth party	Fifth party
Party	Labour	Independent
Seats won	1	8
Seat change	Steady	▼2
- Results by Local Electoral Area

An election to all 37 seats on Donegal County Council took place on 24 May 2019 as part of the 2019 Irish local elections. County Donegal was divided into 7 local electoral areas (LEAs) to elect councillors for a five-year term of office on the electoral system of proportional representation by means of the single transferable vote (PR-STV).

== Boundary changes ==
Following a recommendation of the 2018 Boundary Committee, the boundaries of the LEAs were altered from which had been used at the 2014 elections. Its terms of reference required no change in the total number of councillors but set a lower maximum LEA size of seven councillors, whereas Donegal in 2015 had LEAs of 10 and 9 seats. Other changes were necessitated by population shifts revealed by the 2016 census.

== Overview ==
Fianna Fáil gained an additional seat to reach 12 and also saw a slight increase in their vote share. Anthony Molloy – who captained the Donegal GAA team to the 1992 All-Ireland Senior Football Championship – won a seat for the party, as did rally driver Manus Kelly (both for the first time). However, Seamus O Domhnaill – Fianna Fáil's outgoing Cathaoirleach – was a notable casualty, as was former Senator Enda Bonner.

Unlike other performances around the State, Sinn Féin actually gained a seat in Donegal; increasing their numbers by 1 to 10 seats while seeing a slight reduction in vote share. Fine Gael retained 6 seats overall, while Independents saw a reduction of 2 seats. One Independent elected was John O'Donnell, who attracted controversy following an RTÉ Investigates programme into Irish councillors.

== Results by party ==
Party	Seats	±	1st pref	FPv%	±%
Fianna Fáil	12	▲1	21,142	29.35	▲0.25
Sinn Féin	10	▲1	13,953	19.37	▼0.23
Fine Gael	6	Steady	13,327	18.50	▲2.80
Labour	1	Steady	1,927	2.68	▼1.12
Aontú	0	Steady	2,265	3.14	New
People Before Profit	0	Steady	284	0.39	▼1.02
Renua	0	Steady	279	0.39	New
Independent	8	▼2	18,857	26.18	▼3.22
Total	37	Steady	72,034	100.00	Steady

== Results by local electoral area ==
*: Outgoing councillor elected in 2014.
†: Outgoing councillor coopted subsequent to the 2014 election.

=== Buncrana ===
Buncrana: 5 Seats
Party	Candidate	FPv%	Count								
Party	Candidate	FPv%	1	2	3	4	5	6	7	8	9
Fianna Fáil	Paul Canning	20.31%	1,720								
Fianna Fáil	Rena Donaghey	16.96%	1,436								
Sinn Féin	Jack Murray	16.70%	1,414								
Independent	Nicholas Crossan	13.97%	1,183	1,257	1,263	1,275	1,339	1,410	1,411	1,527	
Sinn Féin	Terry Crossan	9.54%	808	880	902	903	928	995	996	1,012	1,098
Fine Gael	Mickey Doherty	6.28%	532	588	599	601	608	624	624	739	835
Independent	Frankie Lavelle	4.40%	373	399	405	408	507	565	565	597	
Fine Gael	Michelle McKenna	3.75%	318	353	356	359	371	403	403		
Aontú	Joe Murphy	3.59%	304	319	329	331					
Independent	Sinéad Stewart	3.41%	289	315	337	338	367				
Independent	Mark McKinney	1.09%	92	96							
Electorate: 16,798 Valid: 8,469 Spoilt: 143 Quota: 1,412 Turnout: 51.27%

=== Carndonagh ===
Carndonagh: 4 Seats
Party	Candidate	FPv%	Count					
Party	Candidate	FPv%	1	2	3	4	5	6
Fianna Fáil	Martin McDermott	34.59%	2,501					
Labour	Martin Farren	19.11%	1,383	1,435	1,470			
Sinn Féin	Albert Doherty	15.91%	1,151	1,413	1,460	1,460		
Fine Gael	Bernard McGuinness	14.41%	1,043	1,323	1,355	1,362	1,368	1,448
Fianna Fáil	Marie Duffy	8.67%	627	1,022	1,057	1,060	1,066	1,156
Independent	Tracy Cullen	3.90%	282	311	347	352	352	
Aontú	Mary Rose Doherty	2.69%	195	226				
Independent	Arthur Desmond McGuinness	0.75%	54	58				
Electorate: 14,062 Valid: 7,236 Spoilt: 94 Quota: 1,448 Turnout: 52.13%

=== Donegal ===
Donegal: 6 Seats
Party	Candidate	FPv%	Count													
Party	Candidate	FPv%	1	2	3	4	5	6	7	8	9	10	11	12	13	14
Independent	Niamh Kennedy	10.77%	1,540	1,544	1,568	1,585	1,661	1,682	1,749	1,759	1,938	2,031	2,322			
Sinn Féin	Noel Jordan	10.74%	1,535	1,550	1,557	1,573	1,598	1,609	1,690	1,693	1,731	1,873	2,033	2,087		
Fianna Fáil	Michéal Naughton	8.34%	1,192	1,205	1,213	1,224	1,227	1,235	1,236	1,413	1,536	1,612	1,648	1,661	1,742	1,924
Fine Gael	Barry Sweeny	7.81%	1,116	1,126	1,151	1,215	1,217	1,263	1,264	1,353	1,360	1,376	1,424	1,432	1,917	1,958
Fine Gael	John McNulty	6.84%	978	978	978	980	1,106	1,106	1,148	1,153	1,199	1,214	1,393	1,453	1,463	1,547
Independent	Tom Conaghan	6.60%	944	979	987	993	1,000	1,004	1,017	1,028	1,058	1,272	1,373	1,397	1,435	1,831
Sinn Féin	Michael McMahon	6.29%	900	902	924	973	974	1,186	1,190	1,446	1,462	1,470	1,474	1,478	1,749	1,798
Independent	Seamus Maguire	6.07%	868	880	896	907	923	927	939	939	961	1,106	1,163	1,176	1,194	
Independent	Billy Grimes	6.07%	868	873	895	951	952	989	989	1,043	1,050	1,057	1,067	1,075		
Fine Gael	John J Boyle	5.53%	791	793	793	795	810	810	886	888	970	1,001				
Independent	Pauric Kennedy	5.14%	735	751	754	760	760	763	780	783	802					
Fianna Fáil	Philip McGlynn	3.64%	521	522	528	533	533	576	582							
Fianna Fáil	Eimear McGuinness	3.48%	497	498	502	506	527	527	591	631						
Fianna Fáil	Roger Meehan	3.38%	483	484	485	487	503	504								
Independent	Diarmaid Doherty	2.72%	389	394	399	432	432									
Independent	Seán Ó Beirne	2.27%	325	325	329	331										
People Before Profit	Cyril Brennan	1.99%	284	288	319											
Independent	Valerie McNulty	1.36%	194	196												
Independent	Justin Coughlin	0.97%	138													
Electorate: 23,075 Valid: 14,298 Spoilt: 165 Quota: 2,043 Turnout: 62.68%

=== Glenties ===
Glenties: 6 Seats
Party	Candidate	FPv%	Count								
Party	Candidate	FPv%	1	2	3	4	5	6	7	8	9
Independent	Micheál Choilm Mac Giolla Easbuig	15.80%	2,007								
Sinn Féin	John Sheamuis Ó Fearraigh	11.25%	1,429	1,464	1,501	1,558	1,740	1,750	1,782	2,050	
Sinn Féin	Maire Therese Gallagher	8.57%	1,089	1,103	1,152	1,241	1,286	1,324	1,615	1,658	1,693
Fianna Fáil	Noreen McGarvey	8.01%	1,018	1,023	1,043	1,103	1,155	1,171	1,402	1,499	1,506
Fine Gael	Michael McClafferty	7.97%	1,012	1,033	1,038	1,061	1,314	1,341	1,376	1,721	1,799
Fianna Fáil	Seamus O Domhnaill	7.71%	979	1,071	1,079	1,095	1,153	1,161	1,222		
Sinn Féin	Brian Carr	7.26%	922	932	934	978	988	1,211	1,263	1,282	1,290
Fianna Fáil	Anthony Molloy	7.21%	916	928	932	964	999	1,400	1,574	1,702	1,713
Fianna Fáil	Enda Bonner	7.03%	893	914	926	975	1,023	1,056			
Independent	Liam Whyte	6.47%	822	844	856	910	934				
Fine Gael	Evelyn Sweeney	5.7%	724	737	758	822					
Labour	Seamus Rodgers	4.28%	544	562	584						
Aontú	Liam Mulligan	2.75%	349								
Electorate: 23,165 Valid: 12,704 Spoilt: 147 Quota: 1,815 Turnout: 55.48%

=== Letterkenny ===
Letterkenny: 7 Seats
Party	Candidate	FPv%	Count								
Party	Candidate	FPv%	1	2	3	4	5	6	7	8	9
Fianna Fáil	Ciaran Brogan	13.41%	1,570								
Fine Gael	Jimmy Kavanagh	10.53%	1,233	1,245	1,255	1,271	1,312	1,367	1,701		
Fianna Fáil	Donal Coyle	10.18%	1,192	1,209	1,211	1,231	1,249	1,273	1,348	1,389	1,444
Independent	Michael McBride	9.75%	1,141	1,155	1,159	1,174	1,297	1,360	1,430	1,464	
Independent	Kevin Bradley	8.48%	993	1,009	1,024	1,050	1,127	1,210	1,294	1,347	1,465
Fianna Fáil	Manus Mandy Kelly (Note: See change below.)	7.74%	906	924	932	948	1,003	1,028	1,124	1,171	1,374
Aontú	Mary T Sweeney	7.31%	856	860	876	906	932	974	1,041	1,057	1,108
Sinn Féin	Gerry McMonagle	7.17%	839	845	873	903	926	972	995	1,003	1,398
Sinn Féin	Adrian Glackin	6.83%	799	804	813	838	877	935	957	969	
Fine Gael	Bernie Moran	6.33%	741	746	750	762	794	885			
Independent	Thoiba Ahmed	4.48%	525	527	571	637	653				
Independent	Charlie McClafferty	3.92%	459	464	471	491					
Independent	Cathal McGlynn	2.14%	251	252	294						
Independent	Finnian O'Donnell	1.72%	201	202							
Electorate: 22,826 Valid: 11,706 Spoilt: 130 Quota: 1,464 Turnout: 51.85%

=== Lifford–Stranorlar ===
Lifford–Stranorlar: 6 Seats
Party	Candidate	FPv%	Count							
Party	Candidate	FPv%	1	2	3	4	5	6	7	8
Fine Gael	Martin Harley	17.16%	1,688							
Fianna Fáil	Patrick McGowan	16.32%	1,606							
Sinn Féin	Gary Doherty	15.97%	1,571							
Fianna Fáil	Gerry Crawford	13.92%	1,369	1,393	1,468					
Fine Gael	Frank McBrearty Jnr	9.81%	965	1,016	1,041	1,052	1,058	1,079	1,131	1,208
Sinn Féin	Liam Doherty	7.56%	744	776	799	924	929	974	1,036	1,195
Fine Gael	Garvan Connolly	7.25%	713	811	846	857	969	893	950	1,041
Independent	Alan McMenamin	4.82%	474	514	531	537				
Renua	Maghnus Monaghan	2.84%	279	289	296	301	310	317		
Aontú	John Hartnett	2.27%	223	231	238	240	245	264		
Independent	Michael De Ward	2.09%	206	225	236	241	244			
Electorate: 20,389 Valid: 9,838 Spoilt: 160 Quota: 1,406 Turnout: 49.01%

=== Milford ===
Milford: 3 Seats
Party	Candidate	FPv%	Count				
Party	Candidate	FPv%	1	2	3	4	5
Independent	John O'Donnell	25.17%	1,959				
Fianna Fáil	Liam Blaney	22.05%	1,716	1,812	1,968		
Independent	Ian McGarvey	10.34%	805	893	1,062	1,219	1,522
Sinn Féin	Maria Doherty	9.66%	752	780	885	1,035	
Fine Gael	Noel McBride	9.61%	748	793	845		
Fine Gael	Eimer Friel	9.32%	725	747	886	1,213	1,412
Independent	Declan Meehan	8.70%	677	722			
Aontú	Dermot Hardy	4.34%	338				
Independent	Charlie McGinley	0.81%	63				
Electorate: 12,066 Valid: 7,783 Spoilt: 75 Quota: 1,946 Turnout: 65.13%

== Results by gender ==
2019 Donegal County Council election Candidates by gender
Gender	Number of candidates	% of candidates	Elected councillors	% of councillors
Men	74	69.2%	34	91.9%
Women	33	30.8%	3	8.1%
TOTAL	107		37	

== Changes ==
=== Co-options ===
Party	Outgoing	LEA	Reason	Date	Co-optee
Fianna Fáil	Manus Kelly	Letterkenny	Death in June 2019	November 2019	Donal Kelly
Fianna Fáil	Donal Kelly	Letterkenny	Resignation	September 2020	Donal Kelly Jnr
Fine Gael	Bernard McGuinness	Carndonagh	Death	28 August 2021	Johnny McGuinness
Independent	Ian McGarvey	Milford	Retirement	February 2023	Pauric McGarvey
Sinn Féin	Máire Therese Gallagher	Glenties	Retirement	March 2024	Brian Carr
Fianna Fáil	Noreen Garvey	Glenties	Death	29 December 2023	Vacant

=== Change in affiliation ===
Name	LEA	Elected as	New affiliation	Date
Frank McBrearty Jnr	Lifford–Stranorlar	Fine Gael	Independent	June 2019
Michael McClafferty	Glenties	Fine Gael	Independent	January 2020

== Sources ==
- "Donegal County Council - Local Election candidates". RTÉ News. 13 May 2019. Archived from the original on 26 May 2019.
- "Local Elections 2019: Results, Transfer of Votes and Statistics" (PDF). Department of Housing, Planning and Local Government (DHPLG). pp. 89–97. Archived from the original (PDF) on 10 June 2020.
