= 1994 Letterkenny Urban District Council election =

1994 Irish local government election

1994 Letterkenny Town Council election
← 1985	1994	1999 →

All 9 seats to Letterkenny Urban District Council
	First party	Second party	Third party
Party	Fianna Fáil	Fine Gael	Labour
Seats won	4	1	1
- Map showing the area of Letterkenny Town Council
Council control before election
Fianna Fáil
Council control after election
Fianna Fáil

An election to all 9 seats on Letterkenny Town Council took place on 9 June 1994 as part of the 1994 Irish local elections. Councillors were elected in Letterkenny for a five-year term of office on the electoral system of proportional representation by means of the single transferable vote (PR-STV).

== Results by party ==
Party	Seats	±	First Pref. votes	FPv%	±%
Fianna Fáil	4				
Fine Gael	1				
Independent Fianna Fáil	1				
Labour	1				
Independent	2				
Total	9	-		100%	—

=== Members ===
Based on this.

- P. J. Blake, Independent
- Jean Crossan, Fianna Fáil
- Tadhg Culbert, Fianna Fáil
- Jimmy Harte, Fine Gael
- Victor Fisher, Fianna Fáil
- Dessie Larkin, Independent Fianna Fáil
- Jim Lynch, Independent
- Seán Maloney, Labour
- ?
