= McEniff =

McEniff is a surname. Notable people with the surname include:

- Brian McEniff (born 1942), Irish Gaelic footballer, administrator, and manager
- Sean McEniff (1936–2017), Irish businessman and politician
- Terry McEniff, Irish businessman and politician
