= John O'Donnell (Irish politician, born 1980s) =

Irish politician and businessman

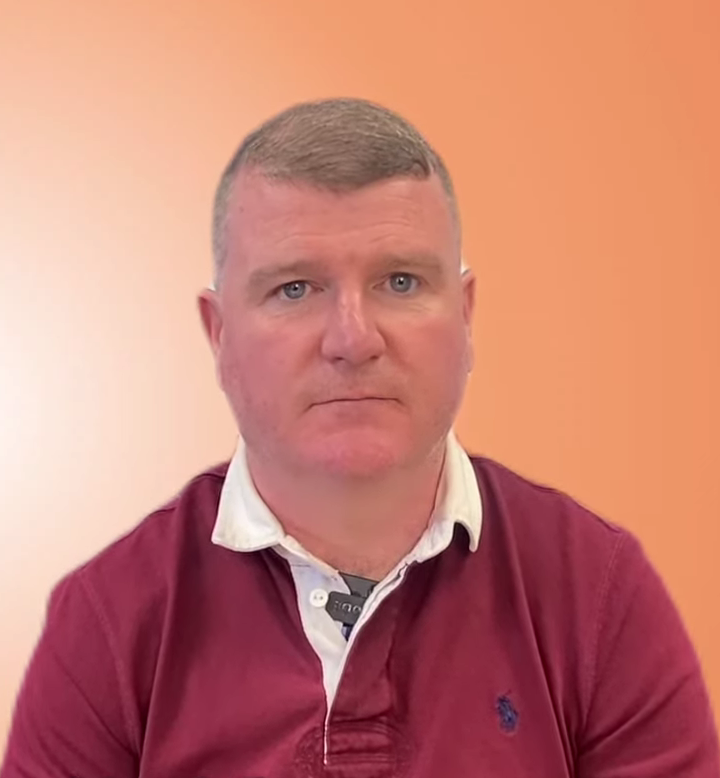
- O'Donnell in 2024

Donegal County Councillor
- In office 2014–2024
- Constituency: Letterkenny

Personal details
- Born: between December 1980 and July 1981
- Party: Independent
- Profession: Businessman and developer

John O'Donnell (born between December 1980 and July 1981) is an Irish politician, businessman and self-described developer, populist and realist. He was a member of Donegal County Council from 2014 until 2024, representing the Milford Electoral Area.

== Electoral history ==
O'Donnell's father Eddie was also a county councillor. Eddie O'Donnell was killed in a car accident in 1993. John O'Donnell first stood as a candidate at the 2014 Donegal County Council election. With ten seats available, O'Donnell finished in third position – behind Ciaran Brogan and ahead of Ian McGarvey (both electoral veterans). At the 2019 Donegal County Council election, he again finished a head of McGarvey. O'Donnell ran as a candidate in the Donegal constituency at the 2020 general election, finishing in seventh place behind Pat "the Cope" Gallagher in the five-seat constituency, and ahead of fellow independent candidate and former presidential hopeful Peter Casey.

O'Donnell lost his seat at the 2024 Donegal County Council election.

== RTÉ Investigates programme ==
O'Donnell was one of three politicians secretly filmed for RTÉ Investigates: Standards in Public Office, which aired after the Nine O'Clock News on 8 December 2015. For the purposes of its programme, RTÉ established an imaginary company it named Vinst Opportunities, with imaginary investors searching for ways to set up wind farms without having to deal with any problems that might arise if the imaginary company and its imaginary investors sought planning permission. Discovering that – five times over the previous four years – companies belonging to him had come to the attention of the Revenue Commissioners for their use of unmarked diesel and under-declaring of income, RTÉ contacted O'Donnell and claimed he "did not hesitate when asked to meet with the company".

O'Donnell met with the imaginary representative of the imaginary company, who secretly filmed him offering to find either an established wind farm or land that could be bought, and that he would assist in lobbying his fellow members of Donegal County Council to support wind farms, which RTÉ described as "extremely controversial in many rural areas". O'Donnell told the imaginary company representative: "I am a developer myself. I am a businessman. I am not a negative person. I like to see things going forward, progress, like ... and eh ... there's some members of Donegal County Council who would be the completely opposite ... I have done it before on other stuff ... within the council, I would have probably – there's 37 [councilors] there, I would certainly have 25 to 30 that are always nearly with me ... you know what I mean ... Because they know I am a populist, like I use common sense ... I am a realist ... you know what I mean? Anything that I would be bringing forward normally, it stacks up."

When the imaginary representative asked what the imaginary company would have to do for him to support it, O'Donnell said the company should pay a middle-man who would then pay him, while – O'Donnell said – "I will be working, I will be working for them tirelessly at the coal face within the council." O'Donnell also expressed concerns that his involvement with the imaginary company would lead to a situation whereby "for me politically there would be a backlash. You know the way people are ... so many begrudgers out there, it's not even funny."

In April 2018, the Standards in Public Office Commission (SIPO) announced that O'Donnell would face an ethics hearing on 11 September as part of its response to the programme. In March 2019, the Commission announced it had found against O'Donnell, stating that he "conflated his roles as councilor and businessman and used his position as councilor in order to promote his private interests as a businessman" and breached the Local Government Act on three occasions, including not having "regard to and be guided by the Code of Conduct for Councillors".

== Arrest and trial ==
On 4 July 2016, O'Donnell was arrested at New Line Road in Letterkenny. He appeared in court later that month on two counts of assaulting two men on 23 February 2015, one at a bus stop in Gortlee, Letterkenny, and the other at a kebab and pizza takeaway elsewhere in the town.

O'Donnell went on trial in December 2018. The judge instructed the jury to find O'Donnell "not guilty" on the charge of assault at the takeaway. He said the issue regarding the charge at the bus stop was not whether O'Donnell had struck the man but whether he was acting in self-defence. The prosecution barrister said O'Donnell punched and kicked the man's face, fracturing his nasal bones and causing him to spend eight days in hospital and to require surgery.
