= Tom Conaghan =

Irish Gaelic football player and manager

Tom Conaghan is an Irish Gaelic football figure who managed Donegal county football teams during the 1980s and, later, the Sligo senior team. His former players regarded him as a disciplinarian in his approach to management.

== Early life ==
Conaghan was born into a family of six, and brought up in the centre of Donegal Town, where his family ran a business that consisted of a hackney, a store and undertaking. His father died suddenly at the age of 50, after suffering a heart attack, when Conaghan was a still a boy.

Conaghan attended Hugh Roe Boys' School and the Tech, before taking up employment as a driver, a job which necessitated travel across Ireland. He then became a farmer, working on his mother's family land in Glenfin. Conaghan also ran a sports shop in the centre of Donegal Town.

== Career ==
Conaghan played with Four Masters and Clanna Gael. He suggested that it was the lack of discipline he saw in the Donegal teams of the 1970s that inspired him to pursue the coaching of the county's under-21 team.

Conaghan managed Donegal to the 1982 All-Ireland Under-21 Football Championship. He later took over from Brian McEniff as senior manager when McEniff had led the 1983 Ulster Senior Football Championship campaign to a win.

Over the course of his time as senior manager during the 1980s, Conaghan fell out with numerous players. He dropped Marty Carlin and Charlie Mulgrew from his team for one year after they played for Letterkenny in a Forster Cup final victory at Ravenhill in 1987. Other players with whom he fell out during his time as senior manager included Declan Bonner, Manus Boyle, Matt Gallagher, Barry McGowan and Sylvester Maguire. Conaghan's spell as county manager ended with a heavy defeat to Tyrone. McEniff, returning to the senior job for a fourth time in September 1989, restored many of those with whom Conaghan had fallen out to the panel in time for the 1990 Ulster Senior Football Championship, which Donegal won.

Conaghan later managed the Sligo seniors. He was mentioned as a possible successor to P. J. McGowan as Donegal manager in 1997 in a dual role with Anthony Molloy. He withdrew and Declan Bonner became manager.

In later years, Conaghan became involved in politics and sat as an independent on Donegal County Council. He first stood for election in 2009 but did not win a seat. He won a seat in 2014 and retained it in 2019. In 2012, he was mayor of Donegal Town. He was elected Cathaoirleach of the Donegal Municipal District on 13 June 2017. He did not contest the 2024 election.

== Personal life ==
Conaghan married Celine and they had three children together. His only son, Kevin, died as the result of an accident, at the age of 14. He continues to work as a farmer, work which includes lambs, cattle and crops.

Sporting positions
Preceded by Brian McEniff	Donegal Senior Football Manager; 1986–1989	Succeeded by Brian McEniff
