= Anthony Molloy (Gaelic footballer) =

Irish politician and Donegal Gaelic footballer

Personal information
- Native name: Antóin Ó Maolmhuaidh (Irish)
- Born: 28 May 1962 (age 64) Ardara, County Donegal
- Occupations: Businessman, politician

Sport
- Sport: Gaelic football
- Position: Midfield
Clubs
- Years: Club
- 1980s–1990s 1980s–1990s: Ard an Rátha; Donegal New York
Club titles
- Donegal titles: 1
Inter-county
Years	County	Apps (scores)
1982–1994	Donegal	123
Inter-county titles
- Ulster titles: 3
- All-Irelands: 1
- All Stars: 1

Anthony Molloy (born 28 May 1962) is an Irish former Gaelic footballer who played for Ard an Rátha and the Donegal county team.

He captained Donegal to the Sam Maguire Cup in 1992.

== Early life and family ==
Molloy is from Leamagowra. This is a small townland on the way over Glengesh Pass on the way towards Glencolmcille. He was born on 28 May 1962. In 1992, he was living at 61 Conlin Road in Killybegs.

He is the uncle of C. J. Molloy.

In December 2019, a niece of his was killed while working as a nurse in the Royal Melbourne Hospital. She was also his goddaughter.

== Playing career ==
Molloy won the Under-14 Championship with his club in 1976.

He played during the 1982 All-Ireland Under-21 Football Championship, which Donegal won.

Molloy went on to play for his county at senior level for twelve years, amassing 123 appearances. He played senior football for Donegal from 1982 until 1994.

Molloy played against Cavan in the 1983 Ulster final, won by Donegal.

He played against Armagh in the 1990 Ulster final, won by Donegal. He was the captain that year.

Molloy did not play for Donegal in 1991, but returned in 1992.

Molloy captained Donegal to the 1992 All-Ireland title. He famously exclaimed "Sam's for the hills" as he did so. His speech is still held in high regard within the sport nationally. He would win an All Star in 1992 as well.

Molloy also won two New York Senior Football Championships in 1986 and 1992, while playing for Donegal New York.

By the end of his playing days, Molloy had been left with a troublesome left knee. It had no joint left, simply bone on bone. Molloy described it, in the Sean Potts-edited book Voices from Croke Park: The Stories of 12 GAA heroes, as being "riddled with arthritis". County team doctor Austin O'Kennedy regarded it as being one of the worst knees he had ever seen. Molloy had surgery on "seven or eight" occasions, before having his knee replaced at the Mater Private in October 2008. He funded the earlier operations with his own insurance. However, the €22,000 owed for the replacement was nearly double the maximum allowed by his insurance and this led to Molloy receiving solicitors' letters from the hospital. He expressed disappointment at the lack of interest from the Donegal County Board in resolving the issue. Molloy contacted his former manager Brian McEniff; McEniff contacted GAA Director General Páraic Duffy and eventually the GAA paid "the outstanding amount".

== Managerial career ==
Molloy managed the county minor team to an Ulster Minor Football Championship title in 1996. Molloy, assisted by Naomh Columba's Michael Oliver McIntyre and Paddy McBride of Downings, also led the team to the 1996 Ulster Minor Football League title.

Molloy was mentioned as a possible successor to P. J. McGowan as manager in 1997 in a dual role with Tom Conaghan. He withdrew and Declan Bonner became manager.

He was managing his local club in 2007. He has also been assistant manager.

Molloy has also managed the Naomh Columba club.

Immediately following Donegal's All-Ireland semi-final victory over Cork in 2012, manager Jim McGuinness had Molloy deliver a message to the players beneath the Hogan Stand in Croke Park. Captain Michael Murphy later described it: "'Seize the opportunity' was pretty much the message he gave us. We're still trying to live by those words now; in every game we play we're living in the present, trying to grab the chance. Molloy didn't beat around the bush when he came in. He warned us that there was no point in us living with the false hope that it would all be quiet, but that we needed to be ourselves. His big message was about seizing the opportunity and how they thought after '92 that they'd win more". When Donegal won the 2012 All-Ireland Senior Football Championship Final, Molloy raised the hand of Murphy at the local homecoming event, where Paddy McGrath and Pat Shovelin also featured.

== Other ventures ==
Towards the end of 2009, Molloy joined the Gaelic Players Association but found it unpalatable. He was regarded as a leading candidate to replace P. J. McGowan as County Chairman when McGowan's five years came to an end in December 2012. In 2013, Molloy was one of six nominees for the position of vice-chairman of the Donegal County Board executive. He was critical of the selection process used to decide the new Donegal senior manager in 2017.

Molloy has spoken publicly of his struggles with alcoholism. He presented the documentary Deoch an Dorais (Name Your Poison), aired on TG4 on 28 December 2015. He has been involved in insurance, property, sales and with pubs. He stood for the Fianna Fáil political party in the Glenties Electoral Area at the 2019 Donegal County Council election and won a seat. He was re-elected for the Fianna Fáil political party in the Glenties Electoral Area at the 2024 Donegal County Council election.

His autobiography, titled Life, Glory and Demons, was published by Hero Books in 2022.

== Honours ==
=== Player ===
- All-Ireland Senior Football Championship: 1992 (c.)
- Ulster Senior Football Championship: 1983, 1990, 1992 (c.)
- All-Ireland Under-21 Football Championship: 1982
- Ulster Under-21 Football Championship: 1982
- Donegal Senior Football Championship: 19??
- New York Senior Football Championship: 1986, 1992

=== Manager ===
- Ulster Minor Football Championship: 1996

=== Individual ===
- All Star: 1992
- Donegal Player of the Year: 1988, 1990
- In May 2012, the Irish Independent named him in its selection of Donegal's "greatest team" spanning the previous 50 years.
- Silver Jubilee Football Team of the Ulster GAA Writers Association (UGAAWA) nomination: 2012
- In June 2016, Molloy was given the Freedom of County Donegal, the seventh recipient of the honour; he followed others such as Packie Bonner, Shay Given and Daniel O'Donnell. He was the first GAA figure to receive the honour.

Awards and achievements
Preceded by Paddy O'Rourke (Down)	All-Ireland SFC winning captain 1992	Succeeded by Henry Downey (Derry)

Sporting positions
Preceded by	Donegal Senior Football Captain; 1990	Succeeded by
Preceded by	Donegal Senior Football Captain; 1992	Succeeded by
