= Republic of Ireland national football team results (2010–2019) =

- Win Draw Loss

This article contains the results of the Republic of Ireland national football team during the 2010s.

== Results ==
=== 2010 ===
2 March 2010 Friendly	Republic of Ireland	0–2	Brazil	London, England
		Report	Andrews 44' (o.g.); Robinho 76'	Stadium: Emirates Stadium; Attendance: 40,082; Referee: Mike Dean (England)

25 May 2010 Friendly	Republic of Ireland	2–1	Paraguay	Dublin, Ireland
	Doyle 7'; Lawrence 39'	Report	Barrios 58'	Stadium: RDS Arena; Attendance: 16,722; Referee: Jerome Laperriere (Switzerland)

28 May 2010 Friendly	Republic of Ireland	3–0	Algeria	Dublin, Ireland
	Green 32'; Keane 52', 85' (pen.)	Report		Stadium: RDS Arena; Attendance: 16,800; Referee: Eric Braamhaar (Netherlands)

11 August 2010 Friendly	Republic of Ireland	0–1	Argentina	Dublin, Ireland
		Report	Di María 20'	Stadium: Aviva Stadium; Attendance: 49,500; Referee: Peter Rasmussen (Denmark)

3 September 2010 UEFA Euro 2012 qualifying Group B	Armenia	0–1	Republic of Ireland	Yerevan, Armenia
20:00 UTC+5		Report	Fahey 76'	Stadium: Republican Stadium; Attendance: 8,682; Referee: Zsolt Szabo (Hungary)

7 September 2010 UEFA Euro 2012 qualifying Group B	Republic of Ireland	3–1	Andorra	Dublin, Ireland
19:45 UTC	Kilbane 14'; Doyle 41'; Keane 54'	Report	Martínez 45'	Stadium: Aviva Stadium; Attendance: 40,283; Referee: Leontios Trattou (Cyprus)

8 October 2010 UEFA Euro 2012 qualifying Group B	Republic of Ireland	2–3	Russia	Dublin, Ireland
19:45 UTC+1	Keane 72' (pen.); Long 78'	Report	Kerzhakov 11'; Dzagoev 29'; Shirokov 50'	Stadium: Aviva Stadium; Attendance: 50,411; Referee: Kevin Blom (Netherlands)

12 October 2010 UEFA Euro 2012 qualifying Group B	Slovakia	1–1	Republic of Ireland	Žilina, Slovakia
20:30 UTC+2	Ďurica 36'	Report	St Ledger 16'	Stadium: Štadión Pod Dubňom; Referee: Alberto Undiano Mallenco (Spain)

17 November 2010 Friendly	Republic of Ireland	1–2	Norway	Dublin, Ireland
19.45	Long 5' (pen.)		Pedersen 34'; Huseklepp 86'	Stadium: Aviva Stadium; Referee: Kristinn Jakobsson (Iceland)

=== 2011 ===
8 February 2011 2011 Nations Cup	Republic of Ireland	3–0	Wales	Dublin, Ireland
19:45	Gibson 60'; Duff 67'; Fahey 82'	Report		Stadium: Aviva Stadium; Attendance: 19,783; Referee: Mark Courtney (Northern Ireland)

26 March 2011 UEFA Euro 2012 qualifying Group B	Republic of Ireland	2–1	Macedonia	Dublin, Ireland
19:45	McGeady 2'; Keane 21'	Report	Trickovski 45'	Stadium: Aviva Stadium; Attendance: 33,200; Referee: István Vad (Hungary)

29 March 2011 Friendly	Republic of Ireland	2–3	Uruguay	Dublin, Ireland
19:45	Long 15'; Fahey 48'	Report	Lugano 12'; Cavani 22'; Hernández 39'	Stadium: Aviva Stadium; Attendance: 25,611; Referee: Said Ennjimi (France)

24 May 2011 2011 Nations Cup	Republic of Ireland	5–0	Northern Ireland	Dublin, Ireland
19:45	Ward 24'; Keane 37', 54' (pen.); Cathcart 45' (o.g.); Cox 80'	Report		Stadium: Aviva Stadium; Attendance: 15,083; Referee: Craig Thomson (Scotland)

29 May 2011 2011 Nations Cup	Republic of Ireland	1–0	Scotland	Dublin, Ireland
18:30	Keane 23'	Report		Stadium: Aviva Stadium; Attendance: 17,694; Referee: Mark Whitby (Wales)

4 June 2011 UEFA Euro 2012 qualifying Group B	Macedonia	0–2	Republic of Ireland	Skopje, Macedonia
20.30		Report	Keane 7', 37'	Stadium: Philip II Arena; Attendance: 30,000; Referee: Florian Meyer (Germany)

7 June 2011 Friendly	Italy	0–2	Republic of Ireland	Liège, Belgium
20:45 UTC+1		Report	Andrews 36'; Cox 90'	Stadium: Stade Maurice Dufrasne; Referee: Serge Gumienny (Belgium)

10 August 2011 Friendly	Republic of Ireland	0–0	Croatia	Dublin, Ireland
19:45		Report		Stadium: Aviva Stadium; Attendance: 20,179; Referee: Tom Harald Hagen (Norway)

2 September 2011 UEFA Euro 2012 qualifying Group B	Republic of Ireland	0–0	Slovakia	Dublin, Ireland
				Stadium: Aviva Stadium; Attendance: 44,761

6 September 2011 UEFA Euro 2012 qualifying Group B	Russia	0–0	Republic of Ireland	Moscow, Russia
				Stadium: Luzhniki Stadium; Attendance: 49,515

7 October 2011 UEFA Euro 2012 qualifying Group B	Andorra	0–2	Republic of Ireland	Andorra la Vella, Andorra
		Report	Doyle 8'; McGeady 20'	Stadium: Estadi Comunal d'Aixovall; Attendance: 500; Referee: Libor Kovařík (Czech Republic)

11 October 2011 UEFA Euro 2012 qualifying Group B	Republic of Ireland	2–1	Armenia	Dublin, Ireland
	Aleksanyan 43' (o.g.); Dunne 59'	Report	Mkhitaryan 62'	Stadium: Aviva Stadium; Attendance: 45,200; Referee: Eduardo Iturralde González (Spain)

11 November 2011 UEFA Euro 2012 qualifying play-offs	Estonia	0–4	Republic of Ireland	Tallinn, Estonia
21:45 UTC+2		Report	Andrews 13'; Walters 67'; Keane 71', 88' (pen.)	Stadium: Lilleküla Stadium; Attendance: 10,500; Referee: Viktor Kassai (Hungary)

15 November 2011 UEFA Euro 2012 qualifying play-offs	Republic of Ireland	1–1 (5–1 agg.)	Estonia	Dublin, Ireland
19:45 UTC±0	Ward 31'	Report	Vassiljev 57'	Stadium: Aviva Stadium; Attendance: 51,151; Referee: Björn Kuipers (Netherlands)

=== 2012 ===
29 February 2012 Friendly	Republic of Ireland	1–1	Czech Republic	Dublin, Ireland
19:45 UTC±0	Simon Cox 86'	Report	Milan Baroš 49'	Stadium: Aviva Stadium; Attendance: 37,741; Referee: Manuel Jorge Neves Moreira de Sousa (Portugal)

26 May 2012 Friendly	Republic of Ireland	1–0	Bosnia and Herzegovina	Dublin, Ireland
15:00 UTC+1	Shane Long 79'	Report		Stadium: Aviva Stadium; Attendance: 37,100; Referee: Nikolaj Hänni (Switzerland)

4 June 2012 Friendly	Hungary	0–0	Republic of Ireland	Budapest, Hungary
20:50 UTC+2		Report		Stadium: Ferenc Puskás Stadium; Attendance: 17,000; Referee: Kenn Hansen (Denmark)

10 June 2012 UEFA Euro 2012 Group C	Republic of Ireland	1–3	Croatia	Poznań, Poland
20:45 UTC+2	Sean St. Ledger 19'	Report	Mario Mandžukić 3', 48'; Nikica Jelavić 43'	Stadium: Municipal Stadium; Attendance: 39,550; Referee: Björn Kuipers (Netherlands)

14 June 2012 UEFA Euro 2012 Group C	Spain	4–0	Republic of Ireland	Gdańsk, Poland
20:45 UTC+2	Fernando Torres 4', 70'; David Silva 49'; Cesc Fàbregas 83'	Report		Stadium: PGE Arena; Attendance: 39,150; Referee: Pedro Proença (Portugal)

18 June 2012 UEFA Euro 2012 Group C	Italy	2–0	Republic of Ireland	Poznań, Poland
20:45 UTC+2	Antonio Cassano 35'; Mario Balotelli 90'	Report		Stadium: Municipal Stadium; Attendance: 38,794; Referee: Cüneyt Çakır (Turkey)

15 August 2012 Friendly	Serbia	0–0	Republic of Ireland	Belgrade, Serbia
				Stadium: Red Star Stadium; Attendance: 7,800; Referee: Alexandru Dan Tudor (Romania)

7 September 2012 2014 FIFA World Cup qualification Group C	Kazakhstan	1–2	Republic of Ireland	Astana, Kazakhstan
22:00 UTC+6	Kairat Nurdauletov 37'	Report	Robbie Keane 89' (pen.); Kevin Doyle 90'	Stadium: Astana Arena; Attendance: 9,500; Referee: Ionut Avram (Romania)

11 September 2012 Friendly	Republic of Ireland	4–1	Oman	Fulham, England
	Shane Long 7'; Robbie Brady 23'; Kevin Doyle 36'; Alex Pearce 85'		Eid Al-Farsi 72'	Stadium: Craven Cottage; Attendance: 6,420; Referee: Andre Marriner (West Midlands)

12 October 2012 2014 FIFA World Cup qualification Group C	Republic of Ireland	1–6	Germany	Dublin, Ireland
19:45 UTC+1	Andy Keogh 92'	Report	Marco Reus 32', 40'; Mesut Özil 55' (pen.); Miroslav Klose 58'; Toni Kroos 61', 83'	Stadium: Aviva Stadium; Attendance: 49,850; Referee: Nicola Rizzoli (Italy)

16 October 2012 2014 FIFA World Cup qualification Group C	Faroe Islands	1–4	Republic of Ireland	Tórshavn, Faroe Islands
19:00 UTC+1	A. Hansen 68'	Report	Marc Wilson 46'; Jonathan Walters 53'; Pól Jóhannus Justinussen 73' (o.g.); Darren O'Dea 88'	Stadium: Tórsvøllur; Attendance: 4,400; Referee: Lorenc Jemini (Albania)

14 November 2012 Friendly	Republic of Ireland	0–1	Greece	Dublin, Ireland
19:45 UTC±0		Report	José Holebas 29'	Stadium: Aviva Stadium; Attendance: 16,256; Referee: Eitan Shemeulevitch Israel Football Association

=== 2013 ===
6 February 2013 Friendly	Republic of Ireland	2–0	Poland	Dublin, Ireland
19:45 UTC±0	Ciaran Clark 35'; Wes Hoolahan 76'	Report		Stadium: Aviva Stadium; Attendance: 43,112; Referee: Sébastien Delferiere (Belgium)

22 March 2013 2014 FIFA World Cup qualification Group C	Sweden	0–0	Republic of Ireland	Solna, Sweden
20:45 UTC+1		Report		Stadium: Friends Arena; Attendance: 49,436; Referee: Alberto Undiano Mallenco (Spain)

26 March 2013 2014 FIFA World Cup qualification Group C	Republic of Ireland	2–2	Austria	Dublin, Ireland
19:45 UTC±0	Jonathan Walters 25' (pen.), 45+1'	Report	Martin Harnik 11'; David Alaba 90+2'	Stadium: Aviva Stadium; Attendance: 50,000; Referee: Marijo Strahonja (Croatia)

29 May 2013 Friendly	England	1–1	Republic of Ireland	London, England
20:00 UTC+1	Frank Lampard 23'	Report	Shane Long 13'	Stadium: Wembley Stadium; Attendance: 80,126; Referee: William Collum (Scotland)

2 June 2013 Friendly	Republic of Ireland	4–0	Georgia	Dublin, Ireland
17:30 UTC+1	Richard Keogh 42'; Simon Cox 48'; Robbie Keane 77', 88'	Report		Stadium: Aviva Stadium; Attendance: 20,000; Referee: Sebastian Colţescu (Romania)

7 June 2013 2014 FIFA World Cup qualification Group C	Republic of Ireland	3–0	Faroe Islands	Dublin, Ireland
19:45 UTC+1	Robbie Keane 5', 56', 81'	Report		Stadium: Aviva Stadium; Attendance: 19,000; Referee: Mattias Gestranius (Finland)

11 June 2013 Friendly	Spain	2–0	Republic of Ireland	New York, USA
20:00 UTC-4	Soldado 68'; Mata 88'	Report		Stadium: Yankee Stadium; Attendance: 39,368; Referee: Jair Marrufo (U.S.A.)

14 August 2013 Friendly	Wales	0–0	Republic of Ireland	Cardiff, Wales
19:45		Report		Stadium: Cardiff City Stadium; Attendance: 20,000; Referee: Pavel Královec (Czech Republic)

6 September 2013 2014 FIFA World Cup qualification Group C	Republic of Ireland	1–2	Sweden	Dublin, Ireland
19:45 UTC+1	Robbie Keane 22'	Report	Johan Elmander 33'; Anders Svensson 57'	Stadium: Aviva Stadium; Attendance: 49,500; Referee: Damir Skomina (Slovenia)

10 September 2013 2014 FIFA World Cup qualification Group C	Austria	1–0	Republic of Ireland	Vienna, Austria
20:45 UTC+2	David Alaba 84'	Report		Stadium: Ernst-Happel-Stadion; Attendance: 48,545; Referee: Olegário Benquerença (Portugal)

11 October 2013 2014 FIFA World Cup qualification Group C	Germany	3–0	Republic of Ireland	Cologne, Germany
20:45 UTC+2	Sami Khedira 12'; André Schürrle 58'; Mesut Özil 90+1'	Report		Stadium: RheinEnergieStadion; Referee: Serge Gumienny (Belgium)

15 October 2013 2014 FIFA World Cup qualification Group C	Republic of Ireland	3–1	Kazakhstan	Dublin, Ireland
19:45 UTC+1	Robbie Keane 17' (pen.); John O'Shea 26'; Dmitriy Shomko 77' (o.g.)	Report	Dmitriy Shomko 13'	Stadium: Aviva Stadium; Attendance: 21,700; Referee: Vadims Direktorenko (Latvia)

15 November 2013 Friendly	Republic of Ireland	3–0	Latvia	Dublin, Ireland
19:45	Robbie Keane 22'; Aiden McGeady 68'; Shane Long 79'	Report		Stadium: Aviva Stadium; Attendance: 37,100; Referee: Andreas Ekberg (Sweden)

19 November 2013 Friendly	Poland	0–0	Republic of Ireland	Poznań, Poland
20:45		Report		Stadium: Stadion Miejski; Attendance: 3,500; Referee: Richard Trutz (Slovakia)

=== 2014 ===
5 March 2014 Friendly	Republic of Ireland	1–2	Serbia	Dublin, Ireland
19:45 UTC±0	Shane Long 7'	Report	James McCarthy 47' (o.g.); Filip Đorđević 59'	Stadium: Lansdowne Road; Attendance: 37,595; Referee: Viktor Kassai (Hungary)

25 May 2014 Friendly	Republic of Ireland	1–2	Turkey	Dublin, Ireland
19:45 UTC+1	Jonathan Walters 78'	Report	Ahmet İlhan Özek 17'; Tarık Çamdal 75'	Stadium: Lansdowne Road; Attendance: 25,191; Referee: Ruddy Buquet (France)

31 May 2014 Friendly	Italy	0–0	Republic of Ireland	Fulham, England
19:45 UTC+1		Report		Stadium: Craven Cottage; Attendance: 22,879; Referee: Michael Oliver (England)

6 June 2014 Friendly	Costa Rica	1–1	Republic of Ireland	Chester, United States
20:00 UTC-4	Celso Borges 64' (pen.)	Report	Kevin Doyle 17'	Stadium: PPL Park; Attendance: 7,000; Referee: Raúl Castro (Honduras)

10 June 2014 Friendly	Republic of Ireland	1–5	Portugal	East Rutherford, United States
19:45 UTC-4	James McClean 47'	Report	Hugo Almeida 3', 37'; Richard Keogh 20' (o.g.); Vieirinha 77'; Fábio Coentrão 83'	Stadium: MetLife Stadium; Attendance: 46,063; Referee: Baldomero Toledo (United States)

3 September 2014 Friendly	Republic of Ireland	2–0	Oman	Dublin, Ireland
19:45 UTC+1	Kevin Doyle 20'; Alex Pearce 81'	Report		Stadium: Lansdowne Road; Attendance: 14,376; Referee: Ilias Spathas (Greece)

7 September 2014 UEFA Euro 2016 qualifying Group D	Georgia	1–2	Republic of Ireland	Tbilisi, Georgia
20:00 UTC+4	Tornike Okriashvili 38'	Report	Aiden McGeady 24', 90'	Stadium: Dinamo Arena; Attendance: 22,000; Referee: Kevin Blom (Netherlands)

11 October 2014 UEFA Euro 2016 qualifying Group D	Republic of Ireland	7–0	Gibraltar	Dublin, Ireland
17:00	Robbie Keane 6', 14', 18' (pen.); James McClean 46', 53'; Jordan Perez 52' (o.g.); Wes Hoolahan 56'	Report		Stadium: Lansdowne Road; Attendance: 35,123; Referee: Leontios Trattou (Cyprus)

14 October 2014 UEFA Euro 2016 qualifying Group D	Germany	1–1	Republic of Ireland	Gelsenkirchen, Germany
20:45	Toni Kroos 71'	Report	John O'Shea 90+4'	Stadium: Veltins-Arena; Attendance: 51,204; Referee: Damir Skomina (Slovenia)

14 November 2014 UEFA Euro 2016 qualifying Group D	Scotland	1–0	Republic of Ireland	Glasgow, Scotland
19:45 UTC+1	Shaun Maloney 75'	Report		Stadium: Celtic Park; Attendance: 55,000; Referee: Milorad Mažić (Serbia)

18 November 2014 Friendly	Republic of Ireland	4–1	United States	Dublin, Ireland
19:45 UTC±0	Anthony Pilkington 7'; Robbie Brady 55', 86'; James McClean 82'	Report	Mix Diskerud 39'	Stadium: Lansdowne Road; Attendance: 33,332; Referee: Paweł Raczkowski (Poland)

=== 2015 ===
29 March 2015 UEFA Euro 2016 qualifying Group D	Republic of Ireland	1–1	Poland	Dublin, Ireland
19:45	Shane Long 90+1'	Report	Sławomir Peszko 26'	Stadium: Lansdowne Road; Attendance: 50,000; Referee: Jonas Eriksson, (Sweden)

4 June 2015 Unofficial friendly	Republic of Ireland	0–0	Northern Ireland	Dublin, Ireland
13:00		Report		Stadium: Lansdowne Road; Attendance: 50 (closed-door match); Referee: Paul McLaughlin (Ireland)

7 June 2015 Friendly	Republic of Ireland	0–0	England	Dublin, Ireland
13:00		Report		Stadium: Lansdowne Road; Attendance: 43,486; Referee: Arnold Hunter (Northern Ireland)

13 June 2015 UEFA Euro 2016 qualifying Group D	Republic of Ireland	1–1	Scotland	Dublin, Ireland
17:00	Jonathan Walters 38'	Report	John O'Shea 47' (o.g.)	Stadium: Lansdowne Road; Attendance: 49,063; Referee: Nicola Rizzoli (Italy)

4 September 2015 UEFA Euro 2016 qualifying Group D	Gibraltar	0–4	Republic of Ireland	Faro, Portugal
20:45		Report	Cyrus Christie 27'; Robbie Keane 49', 51' (pen.); Shane Long 79'	Stadium: Estádio Algarve

7 September 2015 UEFA Euro 2016 qualifying Group D	Republic of Ireland	1–0	Georgia	Dublin, Ireland
19:45	Jonathan Walters 69'	Report		Stadium: Lansdowne Road; Attendance: 27,000; Referee: István Vad (Hungary)

8 October 2015 UEFA Euro 2016 qualifying Group D	Republic of Ireland	1–0	Germany	Dublin, Ireland
19:45	Shane Long 71'	Report		Stadium: Lansdowne Road; Attendance: 50,064; Referee: Carlos Velasco Carballo (Spain)

11 October 2015 UEFA Euro 2016 qualifying Group D	Poland	2–1	Republic of Ireland	Warsaw, Poland
20:45	Grzegorz Krychowiak 13'; Robert Lewandowski 42'	Report	Jonathan Walters 16' (pen.)	Stadium: National Stadium; Referee: Cüneyt Çakır (Turkey)

13 November 2015 UEFA Euro 2016 qualifying play-offs	Bosnia and Herzegovina	1–1	Republic of Ireland	Zenica, Bosnia and Herzegovina
20:45	Edin Džeko 85'		Robbie Brady 82'	Stadium: Bilino Polje Stadium

16 November 2015 UEFA Euro 2016 qualifying play-offs	Republic of Ireland	2–0 (3–1 agg.)	Bosnia and Herzegovina	Dublin, Ireland
19:45	Jonathan Walters 24' (pen.), 70'	Report		Stadium: Lansdowne Road; Referee: Björn Kuipers (Netherlands)

=== 2016 ===
25 March 2016 Friendly	Republic of Ireland	1–0	Switzerland	Dublin, Ireland
	Ciarán Clark 3'	Report		Stadium: Lansdowne Road; Attendance: 35,450; Referee: Miroslav Zelinka (CZE)

29 March 2016 Friendly	Republic of Ireland	2–2	Slovakia	Dublin, Ireland
	Shane Long 22' (pen.); James McClean 24' (pen.)		Miroslav Stoch 14'; Paul McShane 45' (og.)	Stadium: Lansdowne Road

27 May 2016 Friendly	Republic of Ireland	1–1	Netherlands	Dublin, Ireland
	Shane Long 30'		Luuk de Jong 85'	Stadium: Lansdowne Road

31 May 2016 Friendly	Republic of Ireland	1–2	Belarus	Cork, Ireland
	Stephen Ward 72'		Mikhail Gordeichuk 20'; Maksim Valadzko 63'	Stadium: Turners Cross

13 June 2016 UEFA Euro 2016 Group E	Republic of Ireland	1–1	Sweden	Saint-Denis, France
18:00	Hoolahan 48'	Report	Clark 71' (o.g.)	Stadium: Stade de France; Attendance: 73,419; Referee: Milorad Mažić (Serbia)

18 June 2016 UEFA Euro 2016 Group E	Belgium	3–0	Republic of Ireland	Bordeaux, France
15:00	R. Lukaku 48', 70'; Witsel 61'	Report		Stadium: Nouveau Stade de Bordeaux; Attendance: 39,493; Referee: Cüneyt Çakır (Turkey)

22 June 2016 UEFA Euro 2016 Group E	Italy	0–1	Republic of Ireland	Lille, France
21:00		Report	Brady 85'	Stadium: Stade Pierre-Mauroy; Attendance: 44,268; Referee: Ovidiu Hațegan (Romania)

26 June 2016 UEFA Euro 2016 Round of 16	France	2–1	Republic of Ireland	Lyon, France
15:00 CEST	Griezmann 58', 61'	Report	Brady 2' (pen.); Duffy (red card) 66'	Stadium: Parc Olympique Lyonnais; Attendance: 56,279; Referee: Nicola Rizzoli (Italy)

31 August 2016 Friendly	Republic of Ireland	4–0	Oman	Dublin, Ireland
	Brady 8'; Keane 30'; Walters 34', 63'			Stadium: Landsdowne Road; Referee: Demetris Masias (Cyprus)

5 September 2016 2018 FIFA World Cup qualification Group D	Serbia	2–2	Republic of Ireland	Belgrade, Serbia
20:45 (20:45 UTC+2)	Kostić 62'; Tadić 69' (pen.)	Report (FIFA); Report (UEFA)	Hendrick 3'; Murphy 80'	Attendance: 7,896; Referee: Viktor Kassai (Hungary)

6 October 2016 2018 FIFA World Cup qualification Group D	Republic of Ireland	1–0	Georgia	Dublin, Ireland
20:45 (19:45 UTC+1)	Coleman 56'	Report (FIFA); Report (UEFA)		Attendance: 39,793; Referee: Tony Chapron (France)

9 October 2016 2018 FIFA World Cup qualification Group D	Moldova	1–3	Republic of Ireland	Chișinău, Moldova
20:45 (21:45 UTC+3)	Bugaiov 45+1'	Report (FIFA); Report (UEFA)	Long 2'; McClean 69', 76'	Attendance: 6,089; Referee: Jakob Kehlet (Denmark)

12 November 2016 2018 FIFA World Cup qualification Group D	Austria	0–1	Republic of Ireland	Vienna, Austria
18:00 (18:00 UTC+1)		Report	McClean 48'	Stadium: Ernst-Happel-Stadion; Referee: Sergei Karasev (Russia)

=== 2017 ===
24 March 2017 2018 FIFA World Cup qualification Group D	Republic of Ireland	0–0	Wales	Dublin, Ireland
20:45 (19:45 UTC±0)		Report (FIFA); Report (UEFA)		Stadium: Lansdowne Road; Attendance: 49,989; Referee: Nicola Rizzoli (Italy)

28 March 2017 Friendly	Republic of Ireland	0–1	Iceland	Dublin, Ireland
19:45 (UTC+1)		Report	Magnússon 21'	Stadium: Lansdowne Road; Attendance: 37,241; Referee: Jakob Kehlet (Denmark)

1 June 2017 Friendly	Mexico	3–1	Republic of Ireland	East Rutherford, United States
20:30 (UTC−4)	J. M. Corona 16'; Jiménez 25' (pen.); Vela 54'	Report	Gleeson 76'	Stadium: MetLife Stadium; Attendance: 42,017; Referee: Ted Unkel (United States)

4 June 2017 Friendly	Republic of Ireland	3–1	Uruguay	Dublin, Ireland
18:00 (UTC+1)	Walters 28'; Christie 51'; McClean 77'	Report	Giménez 38'	Stadium: Lansdowne Road; Attendance: 27,193; Referee: Craig Thomson (Scotland)

11 June 2017 2018 FIFA World Cup qualification Group D	Republic of Ireland	1–1	Austria	Dublin, Ireland
18:00 (17:00 UTC+1)	Walters 85'	Report (FIFA); Report (UEFA)	Hinteregger 31'	Stadium: Lansdowne Road; Attendance: 50,000; Referee: David Fernández Borbalán (Spain)

2 September 2017 2018 FIFA World Cup qualification Group D	Georgia	1–1	Republic of Ireland	Tbilisi, Georgia
18:00 (20:00 UTC+4)	Qazaishvili 34'	Report (FIFA); Report (UEFA)	Duffy 4'	Stadium: Boris Paichadze Dinamo Arena; Attendance: 19,669; Referee: Ivan Kružliak (Slovakia)

5 September 2017 2018 FIFA World Cup qualification Group D	Republic of Ireland	0–1	Serbia	Dublin, Ireland
20:45 (19:45 UTC+1)		Report (FIFA); Report (UEFA)	Kolarov 55'	Stadium: Lansdowne Road; Attendance: 50,153; Referee: Cüneyt Çakır (Turkey)

6 October 2017 2018 FIFA World Cup qualification Group D	Republic of Ireland	2–0	Moldova	Dublin, Ireland
20:45 (19:45 UTC+1)	Murphy 2', 19'	Report (FIFA); Report (UEFA)		Stadium: Lansdowne Road; Attendance: 50,560; Referee: Bas Nijhuis (Netherlands)

9 October 2017 2018 FIFA World Cup qualification Group D	Wales	0–1	Republic of Ireland	Cardiff, Wales
20:45 (19:45 UTC+1)		Report (FIFA); Report (UEFA)	McClean 57'	Stadium: Cardiff City Stadium; Attendance: 32,711; Referee: Damir Skomina (Slovenia)

11 November 2017 2018 FIFA World Cup qualification Play-offs	Denmark	0–0	Republic of Ireland	Copenhagen, Denmark
20:45 (20:45 UTC+1)		Report (FIFA); Report (UEFA)		Stadium: Parken Stadium; Attendance: 36,189; Referee: Milorad Mažić (Serbia)

14 November 2017 2018 FIFA World Cup qualification Play-offs	Republic of Ireland	1–5 (1–5 agg.)	Denmark	Dublin, Ireland
20:45 (19:45 UTC±0)	Duffy 6'	Report (FIFA); Report (UEFA)	A. Christensen 29'; Eriksen 32', 63', 74'; Bendtner 90' (pen.)	Stadium: Lansdowne Road; Attendance: 50,000; Referee: Szymon Marciniak (Poland)

=== 2018 ===
23 March 2018 Friendly	Turkey	1–0	Republic of Ireland	Antalya, Turkey
21:30 (UTC+3)	Topal 52'	Report (FAI); Report		Stadium: Antalya Arena; Attendance: 32,000; Referee: Slavko Vinčić (Slovenia)

20 May 2018 Unofficial friendly	Celtic (Scotland)	2–2	Republic of Ireland XI	Glasgow, Scotland
	Griffiths; Roberts	Report	Browne; Doohan (o.g.)	Stadium: Celtic Park

28 May 2018 Friendly	France	2–0	Republic of Ireland	Saint-Denis, France
21:00 (UTC+2)	Giroud 40'; Fekir 44'	Report (UEFA); Report		Stadium: Stade de France; Attendance: 70,000; Referee: Georgi Kabakov (Bulgaria)

2 June 2018 Friendly	Republic of Ireland	2–1	United States	Dublin, Ireland
20:00 (UTC+1)	Burke 57'; Judge 90'	Report (USSF); Report	Wood 45+1'	Stadium: Lansdowne Road; Attendance: 32,300; Referee: Andrew Dallas (Scotland)

6 September 2018 2018–19 UEFA Nations League B Group 4	Wales	4–1	Republic of Ireland	Cardiff, Wales
20:45 (19:45 UTC+1)	Lawrence 6'; Bale 18'; Ramsey 37'; C. Roberts 55'	Report (UEFA)	S. Williams 66'	Stadium: Cardiff City Stadium; Attendance: 25,657; Referee: Clément Turpin (France)

11 September 2018 Friendly	Poland	1–1	Republic of Ireland	Wrocław, Poland
20:45 (UTC+2)	Klich 87'	Report	O'Brien 53'	Stadium: Stadion Miejski; Attendance: 25,455; Referee: Boris Marhefka (Slovakia)

13 October 2018 2018–19 UEFA Nations League B Group 4	Republic of Ireland	0–0	Denmark	Dublin, Ireland
20:45 (19:45 UTC+1)		Report (UEFA)		Stadium: Lansdowne Road; Attendance: 41,220; Referee: Xavier Estrada Fernández (Spain)

16 October 2018 2018–19 UEFA Nations League B Group 4	Republic of Ireland	0–1	Wales	Dublin, Ireland
20:45 (19:45 UTC+1)		Report (UEFA)	Wilson 58'	Stadium: Lansdowne Road; Attendance: 38,321; Referee: Björn Kuipers (Netherlands)

15 November 2018 Friendly	Republic of Ireland	0–0	Northern Ireland	Dublin, Ireland
20:45 (UTC±0)		Report		Stadium: Lansdowne Road; Attendance: 31,241; Referee: Slavko Vinčić (Slovenia)

19 November 2018 2018–19 UEFA Nations League B Group 4	Denmark	0–0	Republic of Ireland	Aarhus, Denmark
20:45 (UTC+1)		Report (UEFA)		Stadium: Idrætspark; Attendance: 11,130; Referee: Aliyar Aghayev (Azerbaijan)

=== 2019 ===
23 March 2019 UEFA Euro 2020 qualifying Group D	Gibraltar	0–1	Republic of Ireland	Gibraltar
18:00 (UTC+1)		Report (UEFA)	Hendrick 49'	Stadium: Victoria Stadium; Attendance: 2,000; Referee: Anastasios Papapetrou (Greece)

26 March 2019 UEFA Euro 2020 qualifying Group D	Republic of Ireland	1–0	Georgia	Dublin, Ireland
20:45 (19:45 UTC±0)	Hourihane 36'	Report (UEFA)		Stadium: Lansdowne Road; Attendance: 40,317; Referee: Serdar Gözübüyük (Netherlands)

7 June 2019 UEFA Euro 2020 qualifying Group D	Denmark	1–1	Republic of Ireland	Copenhagen, Denmark
20:45 (19:45 UTC+1)	Højbjerg 76'	Report (UEFA)	Duffy 85'	Stadium: Parken Stadium; Attendance: 34,610; Referee: Cüneyt Çakır (Turkey)

10 June 2019 UEFA Euro 2020 qualifying Group D	Republic of Ireland	2–0	Gibraltar	Dublin, Ireland
20:45 (19:45 UTC+1)	J. Chipolina 29' (o.g.); Brady 90+3'	Report (UEFA)		Stadium: Lansdowne Road; Attendance: 36,281; Referee: Radu Petrescu (Romania)

5 September 2019 UEFA Euro 2020 qualifying Group D	Republic of Ireland	1–1	Switzerland	Dublin, Ireland
20:45 (19:45 UTC+1)	McGoldrick 85'	Report (UEFA)	Schär 74'	Stadium: Lansdowne Road; Attendance: 44,111; Referee: Carlos del Cerro Grande (Spain)

10 September 2019 Friendly	Republic of Ireland	3–1	Bulgaria	Dublin, Ireland
19:45 (UTC+1)	Browne 56'; Long 83'; Collins 86'	Report	I. Popov 67' (pen.)	Stadium: Lansdowne Road; Attendance: 18,259; Referee: Tobias Welz (Germany)

12 October 2019 UEFA Euro 2020 qualifying Group D	Georgia	0–0	Republic of Ireland	Tbilisi, Georgia
15:00 (17:00 UTC+4)		Report (UEFA)		Stadium: Boris Paichadze Dinamo Arena; Attendance: 24,385; Referee: Marco Guida (Italy)

15 October 2019 UEFA Euro 2020 qualifying Group D	Switzerland	2–0	Republic of Ireland	Geneva, Switzerland
20:45 (19:45 UTC+1)	Seferovic 16'; Fernandes 90+3'	Report (UEFA)		Stadium: Stade de Genève; Attendance: 24,766; Referee: Szymon Marciniak (Poland)

14 November 2019 Friendly	Republic of Ireland	3–1	New Zealand	Dublin, Ireland
19:45 (UTC±0)	Williams 45'; Maguire 52'; Robinson 75'	Report	McCowatt 30'	Stadium: Lansdowne Road

18 November 2019 UEFA Euro 2020 qualifying Group D	Republic of Ireland	1–1	Denmark	Dublin, Ireland
20:45 (19:45 UTC±0)	Doherty 85'	Report (UEFA)	Braithwaite 73'	Stadium: Lansdowne Road; Referee: Felix Brych (Germany)
