= Gerry McMonagle =

Irish politician

Donegal County Councillor
- Incumbent
- Assumed office 2014
- Constituency: Letterkenny

Personal details
- Born: William Gerard McMonagle
- Party: Sinn Féin

William Gerard McMonagle is an Irish Sinn Féin politician. He is a member of Donegal County Council, representing the Letterkenny Electoral Area.

He has appeared on national radio to discuss local events. He has also been a mayor.

== Arrest and trial ==
McMonagle was arrested a week after the 1982 murder of Hugh "Lexie" Cummings - shot while driving home for lunch from his workplace in Strabane, County Tyrone. McMonagle was held in custody until the case went to trial the following year. He was then released due to papers being improperly countersigned but was arrested again while departing from court. He was later released again. At this point he crossed the border and took up residence in County Donegal on the north-west of the island. According to the Irish Independent, McMonagle was listed as being 'on the run' in 2003. Democratic Unionist Party MP Jim Shannon used the legal immunity of parliamentary privilege in 2012 to link McMonagle with the Cummings murder.

== Electoral history ==
McMonagle first stood as a candidate for Sinn Féin at the 1999 Donegal County Council election. Though not elected, he did secure his deposit - which was lost by Fine Gael candidate Paddy Gildea.

At the 2004 Letterkenny Town Council election, with nine seats available, McMonagle finished in seventh place - his first electoral success. He joined Damien Blake and Neil Clarke as new members of Letterkenny Town Council.

At the 2014 Donegal County Council election, with ten seats available, McMonagle finished in sixth place, trailing James Pat McDaid, Ian McGarvey, John O'Donnell, Ciaran Brogan and Liam Blaney, and secured election to Donegal County Council for the first time.

As mayor, McMonagle was photographed walking around Derry with Taoiseach Leo Varadkar on an official visit by the Taoiseach across the border in 2017, prompting an angry response from a niece of Cummings. When contacted, no comment from Varadkar was forthcoming.
