= Rena Donaghey =

Irish politician

Donegal County Councillor
- In office 10 June 1999 – 7 June 2024
- Constituency: Buncrana

Cathaoirleach of Donegal County Council
- In office 17 June 2020 – 30 June 2021
- Preceded by: Nicolas Crossan
- Succeeded by: Jack Murray

Personal details
- Party: Fianna Fáil

Rena Donaghey is an Irish politician from County Donegal. Donaghey was a Councillor on Donegal County Council from 1999 until her retirement in 2024. She has served as chairperson of the Donegal ETB (elected October 2017), as well as deputy chairperson (elected September 2019, and again in December 2023).

== Political career ==
She was first elected to Donegal County Council in 1999. At the 2019 election, Donaghey was elected on the first count and for a sixth time. In June 2020, she succeeded Nicolas Crossan as Cathaoirleach ("First Citizen"), becoming the first female Fianna Fáil member to be elected Cathaoirleach in its 121-year history. As a result of the COVID-19 pandemic, this was the first time since January 2020 that a meeting could take place. During her first address as Cathaoirleach she had a moment of silence for those who had died due to COVID-19. She used the occasion to draw attention to the controversial issue of sex ratio within power politics. She also took the opportunity to mention Manus Kelly, the politician who had died in tragic circumstances shortly following the election of the previous year, and also found time to give her condolences to Martin Farren, another politician, whose wife Eileen had died a short time before. As Cathaoirleach Donaghey expressed interest in giving her focus to rural broadband, hospitality and tourism. From Buncrana, she was the first woman from that town to accede to the position of Cathaoirleach.

With Minister for Agriculture, Food and the Marine Charlie McConalogue, she launched the "Ireland's DNA" initiative in 2021 and received coverage in national media as a result. Also in 2021, she launched the long-awaited Joe Bonnar Link Road, which was facilitated by the European Regional Development Fund (ERDF), one of the European Structural and Investment Funds allocated by the European Union. She also embarked on a unique cross-border joint effort with the mayors of Strabane and Derry cities to urge compliance with the COVID-19 restrictions, as the pandemic threatened to escalate out of control. This initiative was particularly to the fore when the Taoiseach Leo Varadkar placed Donegal onto special Level 3 restrictions in September 2020.

Donaghey did not seek re-election at the 2024 local election.

== Personal life ==
Married to Patrick since 1984, she is a mother of several children, and has now gone on to be a grandmother as well.
