= Ian McGarvey =

Irish politician and association footballer

Donegal County Councillor
- In office 5 June 2009 – February 2023
- Constituency: Letterkenny
- In office June 2004 – June 2009
- Constituency: Milford

Personal details
- Born: July 1929 (age 96)
- Party: Independent
- Known for: Record-breaking mayoralties Captaining Swilly Rovers to the 1962 FAI Junior Cup; Having a vine dedicated to him in the Thuringian town of Rudolstadt

Ian McGarvey (born July 1929) is a former footballer and former politician. He was a member of Donegal County Council, representing the Letterkenny electoral area.

Due to his age (his political career peaking while an octogenarian) he is often portrayed as an underdog, "They're always writing me off. I don't worry about that", he once said after being re-elected. He has a special interest in the elderly, and has attracted attention after describing cuts to their care as a form of "euthanasia". He did a noteworthy dance after being re-elected in 2014.

McGarvey has lived at Moorfield in Ramelton, County Donegal, for more than 50 years. In April 2013, in the early hours, his home was attacked with stones and with spray, prompting police intervention.

McGarvey spent a year working in Germany in 1960. He played association football for Swilly Rovers and captained them to the FAI Junior Cup in 1962. He has been a teetotaller (abstaining from alcohol) throughout his life. He is related to Martin Docherty-Hughes.

Aged 82, McGarvey became Ireland's oldest Mayor and Donegal County Council's first independent Mayor in June 2013, succeeding Frank McBrearty Jnr. Aged 85, he became Ireland's oldest ever general election candidate at the 2016 election. Having earlier been Mayor of County Donegal, McGarvey became Mayor of Letterkenny in June 2018 - he succeeded either Gerry McMonagle of Sinn Féin or Jimmy Kavanagh of Fine Gael in that role. McGarvey was at this time approaching his 88th birthday and broke his own mayoral record set five years earlier. As Mayor of Letterkenny, McGarvey - at this stage aged 89 - returned to Germany for the first time since 1960, visiting the Thuringian twin town of Rudolstadt and having a vine there dedicated to him and his wife Marjorie and a plaque erected at a vineyard.

He retired from politics in February 2023. His nephew Pauric McGarvey was co-opted to Donegal County Council to replace him.
