= Jimmy Harte =

Irish former politician (born 1958)

Senator
- In office 25 May 2011 – 23 September 2015
- Constituency: Industrial and Commercial Panel

Donegal County Councillor
- In office June 1999 – April 2011
- Constituency: Letterkenny

Personal details
- Born: 27 February 1958 (age 68) Lifford, County Donegal, Ireland
- Party: Labour Party
- Other political affiliations: Fine Gael (1994–2006)
- Spouse: Mary Galligan
- Children: 4
- Parent: Paddy Harte (father)
- Education: University College Dublin
- Website: jimmyharte.wordpress.com

James Harte (born 27 February 1958) is an Irish former Labour Party politician and was a member of Seanad Éireann from April 2011 to September 2015.

Formerly an elected representative of Fine Gael, he left after failing to win the party's nomination for the 2007 general election, and ran unsuccessfully as an independent instead. He joined the Labour Party in 2010, running unsuccessfully for that party at the 2011 general election but was subsequently elected to the Seanad.

== Background ==
Harte was educated at St Eunan's College in Letterkenny, and obtained a B.A. in Psychology from University College Dublin. He set up his own insurance broker business, Harte Insurances, at the age of 24.

The son of former Fine Gael TD Paddy Harte, he was elected as a Fine Gael candidate to Letterkenny Town Council in 1994 and subsequently to Donegal County Council in 1999. In 2006 he resigned from Fine Gael after failing to secure a nomination from the party to contest the Donegal North-East constituency for the 2007 general election. He subsequently stood as an independent candidate at that election but was not elected.

== National politics ==
Harte joined the Labour Party in 2010 and was that party's candidate for the 2011 general election for Donegal North-East, where he was unsuccessful in winning a seat. Harte was subsequently elected to Seanad Éireann on the Industrial and Commercial Panel in April 2011. He became the Labour Party Seanad spokesperson on Enterprise, Jobs and Innovation.

In February 2012, he offered to pay for the flight of a Polish worker living in Donegal to return "home" to stop her receiving unemployment benefit and FAS training. It later transpired the article was mistranslated from Polish. After it became apparent the article Harte was talking about was mistranslated many people took to Twitter to question him about his opinion. In response Harte began to insult various users. He also accused some users of being xenophobic against Donegal while at the same time accusing other users of being "D4 types" in a derogatory manner. He later removed his comments, though accepted full responsibility for them.

== Health ==
In the early hours of 16 November 2013, Harte was found unconscious at Newmarket Square, Dublin with severe head injuries, having suffered a fall. He was taken to Beaumont Hospital and put in an induced coma, and underwent surgery for a fractured skull and brain trauma. He had attended the Ireland–Latvia soccer friendly at the Aviva Stadium some hours earlier. In late November 2013, he moved his hand. In January 2014, Harte was transferred back to Beaumont Hospital in a critical condition.

Harte resigned from the Seanad on 23 September 2015, and underwent rehabilitative care for 2 years. As of May 2020, he is in Larissa Lodge Nursing Home.
