= Dessie Larkin =

Irish politician (c.1970–2019)

Personal details
- Born: c. 1970 Letterkenny, County Donegal, Ireland
- Died: 18 March 2019 County Donegal, Ireland
- Party: Fianna Fáil
- Other political affiliations: Independent Fianna Fáil
- Spouse: Mary Larkin
- Children: 4
- Parent: James Larkin (father)
- Education: St Eunan's College

Dessie Larkin (c. 1970 (Note: News coverage at the time of his death disagrees on whether he was 48 or 49. His birth year could be 1969, 1970, or 1971.) – 18 March 2019) was an Irish Fianna Fáil politician. He was a member of Donegal County Council representing the Letterkenny electoral area from 1999 to 2014. He served as the County Council's chair of the Planning & Economic Development Strategic Policy Committee. He was the highest paid councillor in Ulster.

Larkin was the youngest ever chairperson elected to Donegal VEC. He was also a member of Letterkenny Town Council.

== Biography ==
Born and raised in Letterkenny, County Donegal, Larkin was educated at St Eunan's College in Letterkenny. He has worked in Unifi and been Chairman of the Peace III Partnership Board and Chairman of the Donegal County Development Board. He was married with four children.

First elected to the Town Council as a member of Independent Fianna Fáil in 1999, he also served as Town Mayor. He was elected as Chairman of the County Council on 27 June 2005, which resulted in him representing Donegal throughout the country. He served in this position for one year. Until 30 June 2005 he was Mayor of Letterkenny. Larkin joined Fianna Fáil in 2006 alongside Niall Blaney.

He died on 18 March 2019.

== Larkin v. the Football Association of Ireland ==
During a football match played on 3 October 1993, Larkin suffered severe burning to his scrotum and inner thighs. In 2006, he sued the Football Association of Ireland (FAI). His injuries resulted from the lime used to mark the football pitch burning his scrotum and inner thighs.

The burning occurred when Larkin was playing a soccer match for Bonagee Celtic Football Club in the FAI Junior Cup. Larkin recalled the lack of changing or showering facilities. He removed his football shorts only to notice "white stuff like Alka-Seltzer" in his shorts. His skin was also inflamed. After an uncomfortable drive home, Larkin applied Sudocrem to the affected area, took painkillers and went to bed. The judge in the case was told there were no instructions from the FAI regarding the amount of lime and water to be included in the mix. The judge awarded Larkin €9,000, also stating that the onus was on the FAI to ensure players were sufficiently warned to take precautions to prevent such incidents happening.

== Expenses and appointment controversies ==
Former environment minister John Gormley illegally appointed Larkin to the Private Residential Tenancies Board in 2008.

Donegal County Council and several media outlets, including Highland Radio, received documentation alleging Larkin was involved in irregularities in expenses payments.
