= Ciaran Brogan =

Irish businessman and Fianna Fáil politician

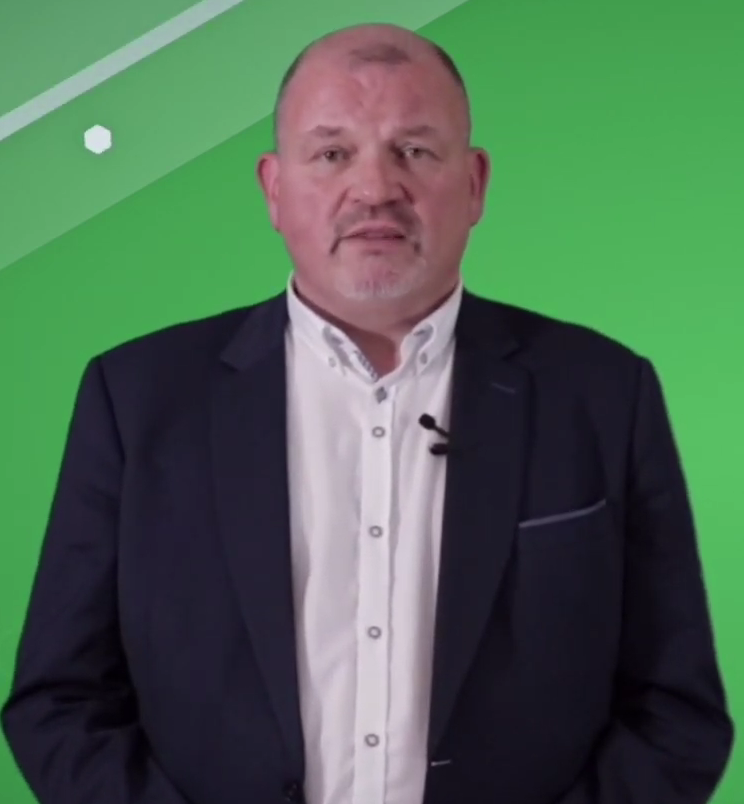
- Brogan in 2024

Councillor
- Incumbent
- Assumed office June 2004
- Constituency: Letterkenny Electoral Area

Personal details
- Born: 1971 or 1972
- Party: Fianna Fáil
- Profession: Businessman

Ciaran Brogan (born 1971 or 1972) is an Irish businessman and Fianna Fáil politician from County Donegal. He is a member of Donegal County Council, representing the Letterkenny Electoral Area, and was a member of Letterkenny Town Council. He topped the poll in elections in 2004 and 2009.

Brogan owns SARK Construction Ltd, based in Letterkenny. Several members of Donegal County Council, including Barry O'Neill, have queried how €4.812 million was spent on SARK's council-backed housing development in Dungloe. The company is known to have received contracts worth more than €10 million. SARK Construction is also a recognised tax defaulter. However, Brogan has vowed to "carefully monitor" any comments made in the council chamber concerning himself or Sark Construction.

He is a known long-term supporter of former government minister Jim McDaid, and walked out in support of McDaid when McDaid withdrew his support for Fianna Fáil in acrimonious circumstances in November 2009. This incident played a significant role in the McDaid faction being left without a candidate ahead of the 2011 general election, and led to the rise of Charlie McConalogue whom Fianna Fáil selected as its candidate instead. Brogan is considered by many to be a successor to McDaid. He declined to run as an independent following this snub by party headquarters. In June 2012, he threatened to make Donegal County Council "unworkable." In November 2012, he clashed with Mayor of Donegal Frank McBrearty, Jnr in the chamber.

In 2006, Brogan claimed €3,499 in expenses for his role on the HSE's Regional West Forum, while in 2007 this increased to €4,041. He has been Mayor of Letterkenny in the past. He was also instrumental in the motion that led to Donegal County Council supporting Dana Rosemary Scallon's candidacy for President of Ireland in 2011.

Less than a week after becoming Cathaoirleach of Donegal County Council in 2016, Brogan was charged with a drink-driving offence for which he was later convicted and disqualified from driving for three years. The officer at the scene found a "strong smell" of alcohol from within his vehicle and Brogan verbally abused him, telling him "Who the f*** do you think you are?"
