= Architecture of Letterkenny =

Much of the architecture of Letterkenny, the largest town in County Donegal in Ireland, dates from the 19th century. Some examples of older architecture remain in the town – though much has been lost also, through decay and modern development.

== Historical structures ==
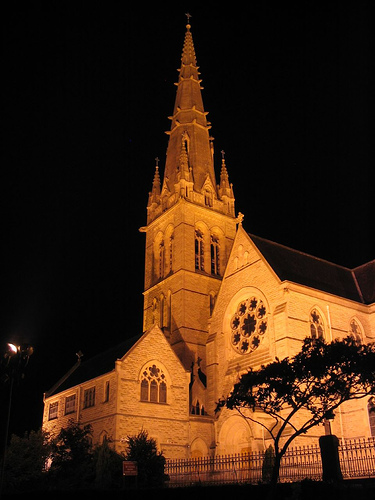
St. Eunan's Cathedral by night

The Cathedral of St. Eunan and St Columba, built between 1890 and 1900, has one of the tallest steeples in Ireland. Located near the town centre on Castle Street, it is the only Catholic cathedral in the county; an older cathedral, now owned by the Church of Ireland and officially called the Cathedral Church of St. Eunan, is located in the town of Raphoe, approximately ten miles away. Letterkenny Cathedral was designed by William Hague from Cavan Town. It is built in the Victorian neo-Gothic style. The ceilings are the work of Amici of Rome, while the stained glass windows that illuminate the sanctuary and the Lady Chapel are by the Mayer firm of Munich.

Another dominant building in the town is St Eunan's College which was built as a seminary in 1906, using the money left over after the building of the cathedral and the parochial house. The college is a three-storey castle with four round towers at each corner of the building. The school is named after the Abbot of Iona St. Eunan, a native of Donegal and patron saint of the Diocese of Raphoe. It is an all-male education facility which today houses over 850 students.

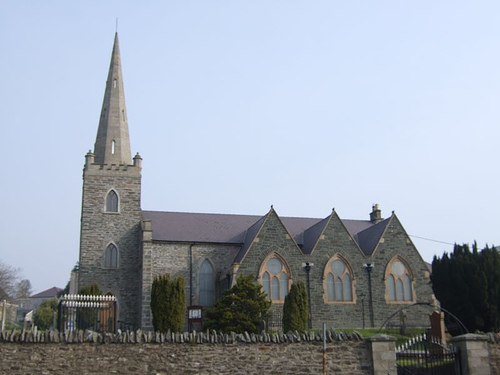
Conwal Parish Church

The Donegal County Museum is housed in what remains of the old workhouse and is located on the High Road. It was built in 1843.

Trinity Presbyterian Church is located on Upper Main Street on the site of the earliest regular 'Meeting House' for Presbyterians, dated with a stone declaring the origin of the congregation in 1640. Presbyterianism in Letterkenny dates back more than 350 years when the Rev. William Semple officiated from 1648 to 1674. The 'Meeting House' then was also on the Main Street and was originally probably a large thatched building. The church adopted the name 'Trinity' in 1916.

Conwal Parish Church is located opposite St Eunan's Cathedral. The church dates to the 17th century. Parts of this Protestant church date from the mid- to late eighteenth-century. It was expanded and extensively altered in the 1860s. The building is believed to have been constructed when a church located at Conwal fell into ruins. The remains of Redmond O'Hanlon are also located on the church grounds.

Rockhill House

Rockhill House is located approximately two miles west of Letterkenny. It is a large classical house dating from the middle of the 18th century with additions in the early 19th century and with further additions from 1853. Its most recent use was by the Irish Defence Forces, who ceased using it as an army barracks in January 2009. Rockhill House is due to be transferred from its present owners, the Department of Defence, to Donegal County Council. A locally based group, the Rockhill House Heritage Association, has been campaigning to have it preserved and developed.

== Modern structures ==
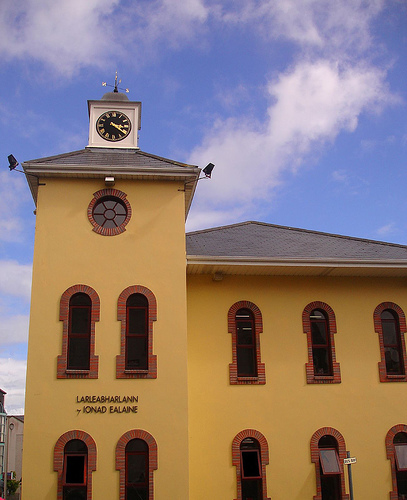
Letterkenny Library and Arts Centre

An Grianán Theatre opened in October 1999. It is the largest theatre in Letterkenny and in County Donegal. It is located on Port and has a seating capacity of 383. It also has the largest stage in Ireland.

The Central Library and Arts Centre is located on the corner of St. Oliver Plunkett Street and Lower Main Street. The centre opened in 1995 as part of the new Central Library building in Letterkenny. It was the first arts centre operated by a local council in the Republic of Ireland.

Letterkenny has seen some modern architectural developments. The Letterkenny Town Council Offices, known locally as 'The Grasshouse' or 'The Grasshoose' or 'The Grass-Roof', were designed by Donegal-based Antoin MacGabhann Architects and opened in 2003. It features a sloping grass roof situated above a broad band of aluka matt cladding and a runway-like ramp to the first-floor concourse. A 2002 article in The Sunday Times reportedly described it as a "building of international interest".

Letterkenny Regional Cultural Centre is a cultural centre located behind An Grianán Theatre in the town and is one of the "leading cultural centres" in the west of Ulster. The centre was launched on 7 July 2007 and opened on 9 July 2007. The facility was designed by Letterkenny-based MacGabhann Architects and is situated on the site of the old council offices. The offices were destroyed in an arson attack but the building has now been redeveloped into a modern two-storey glass building.

Letterkenny Regional Sports and Leisure Complex is a sports complex located near the town centre. The complex is located near O'Donnell Park and the total cost of the building of the complex was €22.7 million. Construction of the building began in 2002. An open day for the complex was held on 18 and 19 May 2007 and the complex opened to the public on Monday 9 July 2007.

=== Other buildings ===
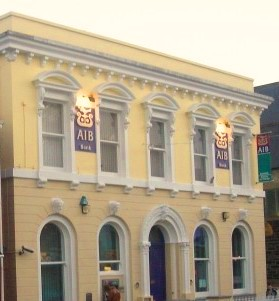
Allied Irish Bank

The Courthouse (1829) dominates the Upper Main Street. However, it is not actually on the Main Street itself, being located just off it. The Allied Irish Bank (1835) building (formerly the Royal Bank of Ireland) is located on Upper Main Street. Like many provincial Irish towns, Letterkenny has a number of large buildings housing banks. The Bank of Ireland (1874), designed by Timothy Hevey, is one such structure in the town. Located at the edge of the Market Square on the Main Street, it was originally constructed for the (now defunct) Hibernian Bank.

=== Hospitals ===
St Conal's Hospital was built in the early 1860s. It is located across the way from Letterkenny University Hospital and overlooks the Town Park. Today it also houses the HSE's dental clinics, physiotherapy units and mental health facilities.

== Georgian architecture ==
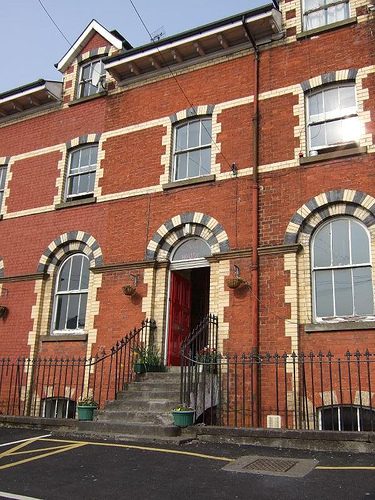
A Georgian terrace at Mount Southwell Terrace.

Much Georgian architecture was evident in the town from about the 1800s onwards. While some Georgian buildings have since been demolished, remaining examples include a terrace of three-storey Georgian townhouses at Mount Southwell Terrace, near St Eunan's Cathedral, towards the centre of the town.

== Bridges ==
The town is located on the River Swilly and provides the last bridge crossing points before the river flows into Lough Swilly, a 50 km glacial fjord.

The Port Bridge is the last crossing of the Swilly before the lough and carries the N14 National Primary Road over the River Swilly, linking the Port Road to the Derry Road. The N14 is the main route of access to Letterkenny from the rest of Ireland and is therefore a vital transport artery for the town and northwest Donegal (via the N56 National Primary Road). The bridge comprises three large-diameter culverts of corrugated steel construction.

The Oldtown Bridge was the first bridge built across the Swilly. It is located about 2 km upstream from the Port Bridge and is the oldest extant bridge in Letterkenny. The Oldtown Bridge carries the L1114 over the River Swilly, which was the original road access route from Letterkenny to the south and east. The bridge connects the Oldtown area to the town centre and provides an alternative route to Newmills and Rockhill House. The Oldtown Bridge is of stone arched construction.

Devlin Way was the first pedestrian-only bridge built over the River Swilly. The bridge was installed just upstream of the Oldtown Bridge and connects the suburban Oldtown area with the town centre. It was designed by local TS McLaughlin Structural Engineers and the ironwork was constructed by Bonnar Engineering. The bridge cost €100,000 to construct. A maroon-coloured cambered steel structure which measures 28 metres long and 2.2 metres wide. It is lit by lamp cast from iron and it also contains a commemorative stone seat with a plaque. The bridge is neighbour to the much older Oldtown Bridge. The bridge is named in honour of the Devlin family who live beside the bridge.

The Railway Bridge is visible from Devlin Way. The bridge was constructed for the Burtonport Extension of the Londonderry and Lough Swilly Railway network. Railway operations ceased on the line in 1940. The span is provided by two above-deck steel trusses.

== See also ==
- Architecture of Ireland
