= Glencar, Letterkenny =

Area in County Donegal, Ireland

Glencar (Irish: Gleann an Chairthe) is a district located to the north of Letterkenny, County Donegal, in the parish of Conwal and Leck, Ireland.

Glencar is bordered by Kirkstown to the west, Killylastin to the north, Windyhall and Gortlee to the east and Sallaghagrane to the south. It may be entered from central Letterkenny on its southwestern flank via the Main Street area. It consists of at least three prominent townlands: Ballyboe Glencar, Glencar Irish and Glencar Scotch.

== Administration ==
Glencar forms part of the Letterkenny Rural Electoral Division. As with some other parts of Letterkenny, Glencar is in the Barony of Kilmacrennan.

== Amenities and business ==
Glencar Irish contains many of the area's residential properties, including those on Dr McGinley Road, at Fernhill and much of the northern part of Long Lane, while Ballyboe Glencar provides many of its amenities, including the Glencar Pharmacy and Glencar Shopping Centre on Circular Road. Other landmarks include the Glencar Inn and the Friar's Rest. The southern part of Long Lane is also in Ballyboe Glencar, as is Slieve Sneacht, Glenwood, Meadowbank, Iona Road, Muckish and Beechwood.

Letterkenny University Hospital is in the eastern part of Ballyboe Glencar, to the west of Letterkenny Town Park (itself south of St Conal's Hospital), which are also part of Ballyboe Glencar. Letterkenny's main fire station is on the southern edge of Ballyboe Glencar. Glencar Park is south of Circular Road.

The Donegal County Museum is just south of Glencar, as are the nearby Famine Memorial Garden and Letterkenny's main garda station.

The Cathedral of St Eunan and St Columba is situated nearby, as is Conwal Cemetery, the nearest burial ground.

The nearest primary school is Scoil Colmcille, located to the south. Secondary education for young men is provided by St Eunan's College, girls attend the local convent and a vocational school is also available, though each is a significant walking distance from the area.

== Sport ==
Letterkenny Bowling Green is at Letterkenny Town Park in Ballyboe Glencar.

The nearest Gaelic football and hurling club to Glencar is St Eunan's, located to the south.

Glencar Celtic is the local soccer club, with Kevin Rafferty (a panel member on Donegal GAA's 2012 All-Ireland winning team) among their players. They play in Division One. They have won many trophies. Glencar have a local rivalry with Oldtown Celtic.
