= Derry Journal Newspapers =

Irish newspaper

Coordinates: 55.01212°N 7.3183°W

Derry Journal Newspapers (formerly Local Press Ltd) is owned by National World. Derry Journal Newspapers owns 4 local newspapers in Northern Ireland. The 4 titles are the Derry Journal, the Sunday Journal, City News (free title) and Foyle News (free title). The company is based on the corner of Pennyburn Pass and Duncreggan Road, Derry.

== History ==
In 1772, Derry Journal was launched and remained the sole title until the 1990s.

In the 1990s, the Derry Journal began to expand its stable of papers with the launch of the freesheet Journal Extra in 1992 (City News from February 2001) and in 1995 acquired the Donegal People’s Press and the Donegal Democrat, the biggest paper in neighbouring County Donegal.

In 1998, the group was purchased by Mirror Group Newspapers (which became Trinity Mirror a year later) from the McCarroll family who had owned the paper since 1925, for £18.25 million.

In October 2000, a second freesheet was launched in Letterkenny, County Donegal called the Letterkenny Listener (renamed Letterkenny People in September 2005) and a third was launched in May 2001 called Foyle News . In 2004, several new papers were launched, with the Sunday Journal incorporating Donegal on Sunday and as well as Monday edition of the Journal called Derry on Monday. The papers has different levels of success, the Sunday publication was and continues to be the only local paper published on a Sunday; however Derry on Monday was axed just two years later due to poor circulation figures and was replaced by an expanded City News.

In January 2004, Local Press Ltd, a holding company of investment firm 3i purchased the Derry Journal Group as well as the News Letter, a leading Northern Irish daily, from Trinity Mirror.

In November 2005, Local Press was then purchased by Johston Press for a reported £65m.

In 2014, Johnson Press's Republic of Ireland titles were sold to Iconic Newspapers.

In November 2018, Johnston Press went into administration. JPIMedia purchased the group.

In addition to Derry Journal Newspapers, JPIMedia own several other local titles across Northern Ireland through the holding company Johnston Publishing (NI).

== Current titles ==
Name	Launched	Type
Derry Journal (Tuesday)	1772 (Tuesday edition restarted in 1958)	Tabloid
Derry Journal (Friday)	1772	Tabloid
Sunday Journal	2004	Tabloid
Foyle News	2001 (previously a freesheet)	Tabloid
City News (Thursday)	2001 (previously Journal Extra, launched in 1992)	Freesheet

The titles are no longer audited by the ABC for circulation.
