= Letterkenny Retail Parks =

Shopping facilities in Letterkenny, County Donegal, Ireland

- Letterkenny Retail Park phase 2
- Location: Letterkenny, County Donegal, Ireland
- Num. of stores: 22
- Num. of anchor tenants: 3
- Floors: 1

Letterkenny Retail Park and Riverside Retail Park are retail parks on the Paddy Harte/Link Road in central Letterkenny, County Donegal.

== History ==
=== Phases ===
Phase 1 opened with Atlantic Homecare, Toymaster, Lidl, Harry Corry and other stores.

Phase 2 construction finished by 2005, with stores such as Next, New Look, Tempest, TK Maxx, Argos and SuperValu. Marks and Spencer and Menarys Department Store opened in May 2007. Due to the 2008 financial crisis, SuperValu closed on 6 January 2009. Phase 2 of the retail park was developed by Patrick J. Doherty.

=== Riverside Retail Park ===
Construction of the Riverside Retail Park commenced in 2006. It has a total of 10 retail units. The first store opened in this phase was a ladies fashion clothing store, followed by Donegal Sports and Sony Centre.

=== Receivership and sale ===
In March 2012, Bank of Ireland appointed KPMG as receiver to Letterkenny Retail Park.

As of 2022, Letterkenny Retail Park had been placed on sale for around €35 million. At the time it had 36 retail warehouse units. The standalone McDonald's drive-thru fast food restaurant and Lidl supermarket were not included in the sale. The Dunnes Stores was also not included in the sale.

== See also ==
- Courtyard Shopping Centre
