= Martin McGinley =

Martin McGinley, who is originally from Raphoe, County Donegal, is a former BBC journalist and also edited the Derry Journal, the Donegal Democrat and the Donegal People's Press. He ran his own PR company Martin McGinley PR. He is now music development manager with the Donegal Music Education Partnership, based in Letterkenny. He is also a traditional fiddle player, and a founding member (1989–1990) of Dervish. He presented the RTÉ television series The Pure Drop, and presented radio programmes on traditional Irish music on RTÉ Radio 1 and BBC Radio 3.
