= Main Street, Letterkenny =

Thoroughfare in Letterkenny, County Donegal, Ireland

Main Street
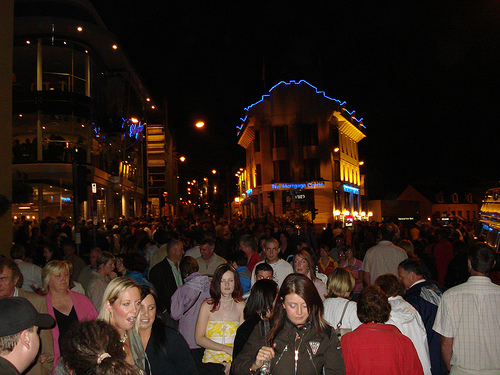
- Upper Main Street lit up at night and crowded with people. Crossview House can be seen in the background. Several nightclubs, such as The Pulse and the Grill Music Venue, are located near this area.

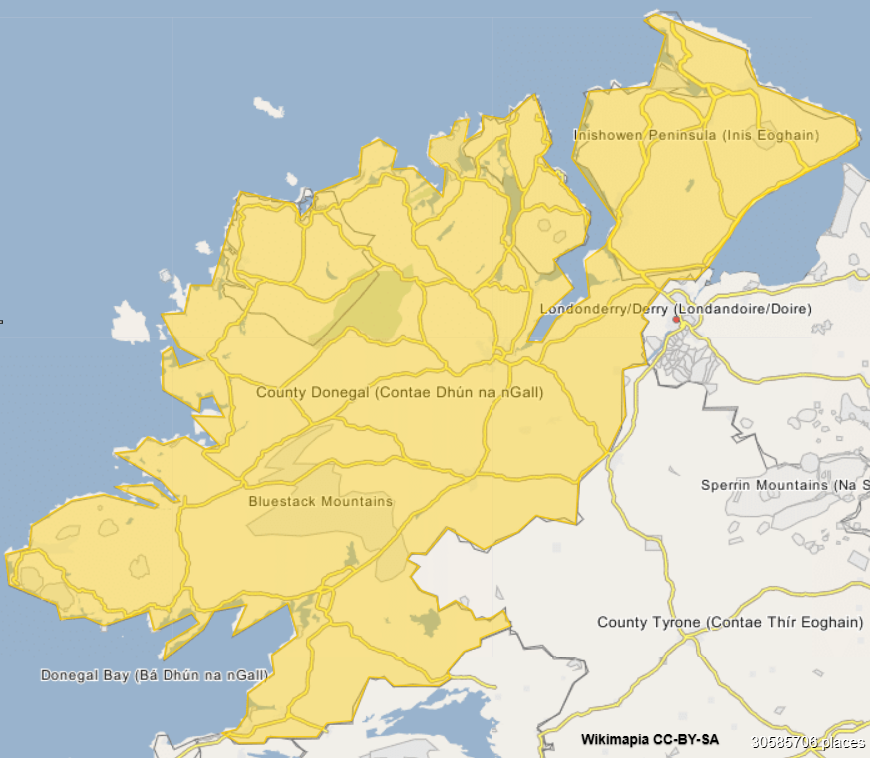
- Location within County Donegal
- Native name: An Phríomhshráid (Irish)
- Type: Main street
- Length: 700 m (2,300 ft)
- Width: 22 metres (72 ft)
- Location: Letterkenny, County Donegal, Ireland
- Postal code: F92
- Coordinates: 54.950157°N 7.73722°W
- North end: High Road, Port Road, Justice Walsh Road
- Major junctions: Speers Lane, Church Lane, Rosemount Lane, Market Square, St Oliver Plunkett Road, Fortwell Court, Burnside Park, Larkin's Lane
- South end: Oldtown Road (R250)

Other
- Known for: shops, restaurants, pubs

Main Street (Irish: An Phríomhshráid) is an important thoroughfare in Letterkenny, County Donegal, Ireland. Sometimes claimed to be the longest street in Ireland, it is divided into two sections, with Lower Main Street (the south end) running from the junction at Oldtown Road to the Market Square and Upper Main Street (the north end) running from the Market Square to the junction at Crossview House. Traffic flows in a one-way system from Crossview House southwards.

== History ==
Theobald Wolfe Tone was captured and held on the street during the Irish Rebellion of 1798. He was held for a short time at Laird's Hotel opposite the Market Square before being transferred to the nearby Derry Gaol. The Wolfe Tone Bar was established in his honour and is located on Lower Main Street on the site of the old Garda barracks. The Barracks building had been there since the 1850s and was an RIC Barracks up to 1922.

Hiring fairs (often known as 'the Rabble Day') were held in Letterkenny in years gone by when children between the ages of 11 and 16 were hired for periods of six months to wealthy farmers of the Laggan district of East County Donegal. These 'Rabble Days' were held annually in May and November at Speer's Lane, at the corner of Upper Main Street. The monument Rabble Children by Maurice Harron was erected at the Market Square in December 1994.

Regeneration works were carried out on Lower Main street in late 1996. Footpaths were widened and cobblestones were placed on the street at the junction with Larkin's Lane. These cobblestones were removed in 2008. The street was the main location of events when the town hosted the Fleadh Cheoil in 2005 and 2006. The Lower Main Street pavements have since fallen into a higgledy-piggledy bad state of repair which has led to calls from the local council for re-paving to be carried out.

On 3 May 2019, the 114th Infantry Battalion of the Irish Army marched through the town in advance of its UNIFIL deployment to Southern Lebanon. Ireland's largest overseas mission to date, the town was selected in recognition of County Donegal providing the largest contingent of troops to the mission (many of the others being from Dublin and other Leinster counties). The ceremony began on the playing fields of St Eunan's College (upon which the Minister with Responsibility for Defence Paul Kehoe gave a speech) before troops descended towards the Cathedral of St Eunan and St Columba and along towards the building housing local publication, the Donegal News. This brought 114th Infantry Battalion the top of this street, down which they proceeded as far as Letterkenny Library and Arts Centre, at which point the troops passed down the adjacent street named in honour of the saint, Oliver Plunkett.

== Description ==
Main Street once served as the main shopping area in the town but trade has now shifted further afield. It is also acts as the financial services centre of the town with the majority of banks being located there.

Today the street is a centre for popular night clubs such as Club Voodoo. It is a popular nightspot at weekends, being the location of many stag and hen parties. The street can become quite vicious in the early hours of the morning and this has led many local to steer clear. The area has seen numerous assaults, stabbings, sexual assaults, drug raids, and attacks on Gardaí in the past.

In February 2020, the Donegal News reported that "from the Quiet Moment down to the Lower Main Street roundabout there are around 40 vacant commercial properties, not including any commercial vacancies in shopping centres or on side streets"; this total included five consecutive vacant commercial units on the corner of Main Street and Market Square, including a barber shop and the former discount shop "Pounds & Pence", located beside the "Funland" amusement arcade.

=== Shopping centres ===
The Courtyard Shopping Centre has an entrance close to the midpoint of Letterkenny's Main Street. Located in central Letterkenny, close to the Library and Arts Centre on the Lower Main Street side and the Bank of Ireland on the Upper Main Street side, it also overlooks Pearse Street and Oliver Plunkett Street. The structure is built spirally on a slope so, if approached from the Main Street entrance, the visitor, when making their way through the complex, descends into the ground via a series of escalators. Letterkenny's oldest Eason's bookstore and Heatons department store are among the outlets to be found inside.

The Market Centre is a small shopping centre located opposite the Market Square. It has a gathering of shops spread around a flat shopping mall.

=== Lower ===
Lower Main Street begins southwest of the Market Square. Speers Department Store, one of the oldest businesses extant in Letterkenny, is situated here. The same side of the street features the Ulster Bank, on the junction with Market Square, and, below this, Veritas and Clarkes Newsagent.

The Letterkenny Library and Arts Centre is located on the other side of the street, on the junction with Oliver Plunkett Road, onto which its main entrance opens. Below the Library and on the same side of the street is the Yellow Pepper Restaurant (at number 36) and the Donegal Stationery Company (at number 50), which has been in business as part of the Donegal Printing Company since 1912 and parted from its parent company and relocated to its current premises in 2001. Above the library is the Courtyard Shopping Centre and the 4 Lanterns fast food restaurant.

At the street's conclusion, past Larkin's Lane, can be seen Letterkenny's earliest Dunnes Stores outlet, while the Tin Tai, a prominent and often busy Chinese restaurant, is also nearby, on the right turn towards Convent Road.

=== Upper ===
Upper Main Street ranges from north-east of the Market Square until it bisects onto the Ramelton and High Roads close to Speer's Lane and Justice Walsh Road. The Central Bar, Letterkenny's oldest such establishment, has been in existence since 1808. R. McCullagh Jewellers, which dates from 1869, is situated nearby on the same side of the street, between Market Square and Church Lane.

Magees Pharmacy, which dates from 1928, is found on the opposite side of the street. It has family ties with Brian McCormick Sports & Leisure (BMC Sports), which is located on the other side of the street, near the Pat's Pizza restaurant (at its current location since 1990, having started at Market Square in 1984) and McGarrigles Shoes, which was established in 1981 and opened its doors in 1982 and went on to become an institution on the street. Across the street, McFadden's Gift & Home originally opened in 1972, and began by also selling prams and pushchairs, then competed with Lower Main Street's Toyland in the children's' market, before focusing on gifts and furniture and expanding to include Meehan's next door after that business shut.

Letterkenny's main post office is situated above Magees Pharmacy. Long queues of dole recipients and pensioners congregate here to collect their money. Further up, close to the adjoining Justice Walsh Road, are AIB and Permanent TSB. Further down, close to the adjoining Rosemount Lane, are O'Hehirs Bakery Cafe and the site of the now shuttered Dolphin Cafe. There are clothing outlets such as the County Seat, which opened on in December 1977 beside the old Dillons Supermarket, moved to Lower Main Street in 1999 and then back to Upper Main Street (number 5) in 2013; it provides school uniforms for the younger population of Letterkenny and others throughout the county.

== Other activities ==
The Main Street has seen numerous assaults, stabbings, sexual assaults, drug raids and attacks on Gardaí in the past.

In August 2009, the Lower Main Street was nearly blown-up when a severed gas pipe was discovered in an alleyway. The street was sealed off as the gas spread around the area. Occupants in nearby buildings were evacuated while attendants at the Wolfe Tone Bar were kept inside for fear of igniting the gas. A gas engineer later shut off the supply of gas from the meter.

In 2011, a Garda and three nightclub bouncers were repeatedly stabbed outside the Voodoo Nightclub. One of the bouncers had his leg penetrated by the blade while the Garda had his hand slashed.
