= Noel Slevin =

Irish journalist

- Born: 16 October 1954 (age 71); Ireland
- Occupation: Journalist
- Writing career
- Genre: Comedy

Noel Slevin is an Irish journalist and columnist working in Letterkenny, County Donegal. He currently writes "Slevin on Sunday" for the local newspaper Donegal on Sunday as well as contributing to the Donegal Democrat. He has also contributed to news reports for national radio and television broadcaster Raidió Teilifís Éireann (RTÉ).

He contributed some of his jokes to the book "Die Laughing" by George Korankye.
