= Donegal on Sunday =

2004–2012 Irish tabloid newspaper

- Type: Weekly newspaper
- Format: Tabloid
- Owner: Derry Journal Newspapers
- Editor: Connie Duffy
- Founded: March 2004
- Headquarters: Letterkenny, County Donegal
- Circulation: 6,691(Jan-Jun 2007)
- Price: €1.10, 0.80p
- Website: www.donegalonsunday.com

Donegal on Sunday was a local tabloid newspaper published in County Donegal, Ireland. It launched in March 2004 as an edition of the Sunday Journal, published by the Derry Journal. Originally called the Sunday Democrat, it was based in Letterkenny. It was part of the only local paper in Ireland to be published on a Sunday with a circulation of 6,691 in 2007. Both the Donegal Democrat and the Donegal People's Press are sister papers of Donegal on Sunday through Derry Journal Newspapers, a holding company of Johnston Press.

By 2012, sales had fallen to 3,547 copies per issue, and the newspaper was closed.
