= Courtyard Shopping Centre =

Retail facility in Letterkenny, County Donegal, Ireland

Coordinates: 54.949°N 7.737°W

- The rear entrance of the Courtyard on Oliver Plunkett Street
- Location: Letterkenny, County Donegal, Ireland
- Address: Lower Main Street
- Opened: October 21, 1993; 33 years ago
- Num. of stores: 28
- Num. of anchor tenants: 3 (Letterkenny Continental Supermarket, Sports Direct, Bookmark)
- Floors: 3
- Parking: Multi-storey (400 spaces)
- Website: courtyardletterkenny.com

The rear entrance view; the multi-storey car park, which is built on a slope descending onto Pearse Road, is partially visible in the background.

The Courtyard Shopping Centre is a retail complex in central Letterkenny, County Donegal, Ireland.

== Location ==
The centre is in central Letterkenny, close to the Library and Arts Centre, on the Lower Main Street side and the Bank of Ireland on the Upper Main Street side; it also overlooks Pearse Road and Oliver Plunkett Street. The structure is built spirally on a slope so, if approached from the Main Street entrance, the visitor, when making their way through the complex, descends into the ground via a series of escalators.

== History ==
Paul Reynolds of Reynolds and Company developed the Courtyard Shopping Centre. Reynolds died after a prolonged illness in December 2020.

The centre opened on 21 October 1993, with actors Mick Lally and Joe Lynch (known for their roles in Glenroe) performing the official opening ceremony. Coronation Street stars Kevin Kennedy and Ken Morley also appeared at the centre. These 'celebrity visits' are commemorated in the centre by tiles which feature a golden sketch of the person's outline. Other such tiles depict people like Packie Bonner and Daniel O'Donnell.

Within less than two years of its opening it had been awarded several prizes for its design and for its content.

The owners applied for planning permission to build another floor of retail space in mid-2007. The application was approved and resulted in an extra 980 square metres of retail area. The centre went through further changes in 2008, with Sports Direct expanding over three floors, occupying the former location of Costcutter. Another floor was constructed to house a Brand Max outlet.

== Shops and facilities ==
The centre has its own multi-storey car park and, as of May 2019, had 28 stores. Sports Direct and Brand Max (formerly Heatons) is present, along with a bookshop and a chipper/takeaway.

The centre was impacted by the recession and economic problems in Ireland in the late 2000s. Many stores closed, some businesses failed, and some other stores moved to the Letterkenny Shopping Centre in Port Road of the town.
