= Club Voodoo =

Bar and nightclub in County Donegal, Ireland

Voodoo Lounge Letterkenny
- Address: Main Street
- Location: Letterkenny, County Donegal, Ireland
- Owner: Rar Fusion Limited
- Type: Lounge and Bar

Construction
- Opened: April 2006

Voodoo is a bar and nightclub in Letterkenny, County Donegal, Ireland. It opened in April 2006 and is located on Main Street.

== Facilities ==
Voodoo was designed by its former owners Jason and Sharon Black and has a capacity of 1500. The club was constructed by Deluxe from Portadown, Northern Ireland. The club has three VIP rooms: The Red Room, China White, and The Glass Room.

Club Voodoo was nominated for Best Nightclub at the Licensing World Awards 2008.

The building houses a bar named "Bar Voodoo". Sound systems are installed throughout the lounge giving equal volume to all areas. The lounge hosts live bands and DJs and alternative theme nights also.

Club Voodoo opened a second club in Gweedore in July 2008. It closed in August 2009, with "increased competition" being described as the main factor in the decision. It was outside this nightclub that GAA All Star Kevin Cassidy's brother bit a man's ear off. Kevin Cassidy was later found guilty of affray and sentenced to community service.
