= Convent Road, Letterkenny =

Road in County Donegal, Ireland

The entrance to St. Eunan’s Cathedral, located on Convent Road, Letterkenny.

Convent Road (Irish: Bóthar an Chlochair) is located to the north of Letterkenny, County Donegal, in the parish of Conwal and Leck, Ireland.

It is situated beside the Cathedral of St Eunan and St Columba and Cathedral Road forms a link with Convent Road south of Glencar and north of Oldtown. Residential areas on Convent Road include West Hill (Irish: Cnoc an Thiar).

== Amenities ==
Several schools are nearby, including St Eunan's College.

Kernan's is a local newsagent which has been in operation since the 1920s. There is also a Dunnes Stores grocery outlet in the area.

A Chinese restaurant, Tin Tai, is located at the bottom of Convent Road, on the turn towards Lower Main Street.

Letterkenny Regional Sports and Leisure Complex is a short distance away.

== Eponym ==
A convent was founded here in 1854, and that building later became a secondary school for girls, Loreto Secondary School, one of 18 such Loreto institutions in Ireland, which are run by the Catholic Church. It is linked with the girls' primary school Scoil Mhuire Gan Smal, both being part of the greater Loreto College Network. Some boys from the area attend St Eunan's College, a short distance away. In addition, a boys' primary school, Scoil Colmcille, is also located nearby.

Mary Ward founded the Institute of the Blessed Virgin Mary in England in the 17th century. Referred to in Ireland as the "Loreto Order", Mother Frances Teresa Ball brought it to Ireland in 1821 and, in 1854, Bishop of Raphoe Patrick McGettigan invited the religious sisters to Letterkenny. A day school opened in 1854 with five pupils. Run as an all-Irish school from the 1920s till 1976, Boarding ceased in 1978. Refurbishments were conducted twice in the 1970s, in 1939, 1986 and 2004.

Loreto Trustees is the legal owner but much is devolved to the board of management. A student council represents girls in liaisons with this board, staff, and a parents' association. Loreto Letterkenny participates in the European Youth Parliament, and hosts a Model United Nations (LKMUN).

Joe McHugh, the former Fine Gael TD for Donegal and Minister for Education and Skills from 2018 to 2020, taught here before entering politics. A teacher from the convent school for young girls that gives the road its name went missing, prompting national headlines and prolonged search efforts on both sides of the border. His body was later found.
