= MacGabhann Architects =

Architectural firm

Practice information
- Key architects: Tarla MacGabhann; Antoin MacGabhann
- Founded: 1975
- Location: Letterkenny, Ireland

Significant works and honors
- Buildings: Letterkenny Regional Cultural Centre; Letterkenny Town Council offices
- Awards: AAI Award (2003); RIAI Award (2003); RIAI Best Building in the Landscape Award (2003); AJ Small Projects Award (2005); Opus Award (2008)

MacGabhann Architects are an architecture firm based in Letterkenny, County Donegal, Ireland.

== History ==
MacGabhann Architects was founded in 1975 by Antoin MacGabhann Snr. The company expanded in 1997 when his sons Antoin and Tarla returned from Glasgow and Berlin respectively. Head offices are located in Letterkenny and Belfast. The firm represented Ireland at the 2006 Venice Biennale International Architecture Exhibition. Their design projects range from houses to public and private buildings.

MacGabhann Architects won an award for 'Best Building in the Landscape' in Ireland and have also received awards and international acclaim for the Public Services Centre in Letterkenny.

In November 2008 the firm were awarded an "Opus Award", in the €2 million to €20 million category, for the Regional Cultural Centre in Letterkenny.

=== Tarla MacGabhann ===
Tarla MacGabhann, (born 1965) graduated with a B.A. in architecture from the Bartlett School of Architecture, University College London in 1991. He previously studied at Letterkenny Institute of Technology and Thames College, London. He later Worked for Daniel Libeskind as on the Jewish Museum, Berlin. He lectures at Queen's University Belfast. He taught at HdK Berlin from 1995 to 1997.

=== Antoin MacGabhann ===
Antoin MacGabhann, (born 1967) graduated with a B.A. in civil engineering from Trinity College Dublin in 1988 and an M.B.A. from University of Strathclyde, Glasgow in 1995. He worked for WS Atkins in London as a chartered engineer. While in Scotland he was senior manager for Bovis Construction. He is also a visiting lecturer at Letterkenny Institute of Technology.

== Notable works ==
Letterkenny Regional Cultural Centre which was designed by MacGabhann Architects

MacGabhann Architects have designed numerous building around Ireland including:

- Breac House
- Letterkenny Regional Cultural Centre
- Letterkenny Town Council Offices (Public Services Centre)
- One Stop Shop at Sligo Gaol

== Awards ==
MacGabhann Architects have won the following awards:

- 2003: AAI Award: Local Administrative Office, Letterkenny
- 2003: RIAI Award: Local Administrative Office, Letterkenny
- 2003: RIAI Best Building in the Landscape Award: Carton LeVert House, Co Donegal
- 2005: AJ Small Projects Award: Greenbox Studio.
- 2008: Opus Award in the €2 million to €20 million category: Regional Cultural Centre, Letterkenny
- 2008: Opus Award under €2 million category: Tuath na Mara, Downings, Co Donegal
