= Donegal Democrat =

Newspaper in Ireland

- Type: Twice-weekly newspaper
- Format: Broadsheet & compact
- Owner: Iconic Newspapers
- Editor: Chris Ashmore
- Founded: 16 June 1919
- Political alignment: Nationalist
- Headquarters: Letterkenny, County Donegal
- Price: Tuesday: €1.35, £0.95 (NI), £1.05 (Great Britain); Thursday: €1.45, £1.10 (NI), £1.20 (Great Britain)
- Website: donegaldemocrat.ie

The Donegal Democrat is a twice-weekly local newspaper, covering County Donegal, Ireland. The paper was traditionally based in the town of Ballyshannon in the south of the county, but now has offices in Donegal Town (southern edition) and Letterkenny (northern edition). The Donegal Democrat is the largest paper focused solely on County Donegal, and its current managing editor is Chris Ashmore. The paper was the only one published in south Donegal from the mid-twentieth century on, and so has gained a reputation of being the local paper of record for that part of the county.

Since its launch, the Donegal Democrat has been published weekly on a Thursday in broadsheet format, and in recent years has become part of a chain of titles that are published three times per week in the county. The paper is now almost entirely integrated with the Donegal People's Press, a paper published on Tuesdays in a compact format. The People's Press was traditionally a north Donegal paper and so, with minor alterations, is published as a Tuesday edition of the Donegal Democrat in the south of the county.

In March 2004, the Sunday Democrat was launched as an edition of the Sunday Journal, it changed its name later that year to Donegal on Sunday which is no longer in print. The Donegal Democrat group is owned by Iconic Newspapers, which publishes several other titles in counties Donegal and Londonderry including the Donegal Post, Inish Times, County Derry Post and Derry News.

== History ==
=== Early years ===
The paper was first published on 16 June 1919, and was founded by John Downey.

The editorial in the first issue set out that it was to be a "non-political paper in a world of politics, but we believed that in doing so we are doing right. We are making our bow to the public at a critical period in our national and local history and it shall be ever our object to uphold anything that, will further the national and local interests."

The paper had a fairly militant nationalist policy, which during the Irish War of Independence led to it being raided on several occasions by police and British soldiers, who on one occasion announced that they were looking for a "typewriting machine". But they left on being assured that there was no such machine on the premises.

For its first years, the paper was completely hand-set, with each letter of type being placed individually; it was not surprising therefore that there were only 10 pages, measuring 9 inches by 11 inches. Its front page contained mostly adverts, with no photos in the paper at all. Over the next few years the paper gradually increased in size and circulation, and in 1922 got its first typesetting machine.

Cecil King purchased the Democrat from the Downey family in 1948.

=== Recent history ===
The Democrat published a number of books between 1962 and 1988.

The paper was put on the market in 1992 following the death of the then managing director, Cecil King jnr. In 1995, the paper was bought by the Derry Journal Newspapers group for an undisclosed sum thought to be in the region of 1 million. The paper was purchased by the 3i holding company Local Press Ltd in 2004, and changed hands again the following year, when Johnston Press took over Local Press. In 2014, Iconic Newspapers acquired Johnston Press's titles in the Republic of Ireland.

== Layout ==
=== Features ===
Community section including local features and town notes; public notices; Donegal Life

=== Tuesday ===
The Tuesday edition (available as the Donegal People's Press in the north of the county), is in compact format with full colour; through its features, it is a little less 'rigid' than the Thursday paper.

=== Thursday ===
The Thursday paper which is available throughout the county, has moved from broadsheet to full colour compact and contains a comprehensive selection of news from around the county as well as lifestyle, health, columnists, photographs and readers' letters.

=== Sport ===
Sport stories form an important part of the newspaper, and coverage is given in both titles to the local GAA league and championship as well as Donegal's involvement in inter-county competitions. Soccer is also quite prominent, including the local leagues, and the progress of Finn Harps, the only professional team in the county. Other sports regularly covered include golf, basketball and athletics.

=== Circulation ===
The Donegal Democrat is no longer ABC audited so circulation figures for the period since 2012 are not available.

In 2007, it had a combined ABC circulation for its Tuesday and Thursday editions of 23,792, for the first half of 2007. Circulation declined, for the Tuesday edition, to an average of 5,855 copies per day, for the period July 2012 to December 2012. Circulation declined, for the Thursday edition, to an average of 7,684 copies per day, for the period July 2012 to December 2012.

=== Website ===
The paper also has a breaking news website www.DonegalLive.ie shared with other Donegal newspapers in the group.

== See also ==
- Martin McGinley
- Donal Reid
- Noel Slevin
- Michael Daly
