= Kevin Rafferty (Gaelic footballer) =

Donegal Gaelic footballer

Personal information
- Born: 1981 (age 44–45)
- Occupation: Legal executive
- Height: 6 ft 5 in (196 cm)

Sport
- Sport: Gaelic football
- Position: Midfield
Club
- Years: Club
- 199?–?: St Eunan's
Inter-county
- Years: County
- 2001–2012: Donegal
Inter-county titles
- Ulster titles: 2
- All-Irelands: 1

Kevin Rafferty (born 1981) is a Gaelic footballer who plays for St Eunan's and, also formerly, for the Donegal county team (between 2001 and 2012).

He played in midfield for his county team.

He has also played Saturday League association football for Glencar Celtic since around about 2017. He plays golf too and is a member of Letterkenny Golf Club.

== Early life ==
Rafferty was educated at Scoil Colmcille and St Eunan's College in Letterkenny.

Rafferty is one of five sons of Martin and Marie. His four brothers are Patrick ("Pajo"), Dwyer, Fergal and Declan. Kevin and Pajo Rafferty have played together for Glencar Celtic, Pajo though did not have the same abilities in Gaelic football as his brother did. The Rafferty brothers also have a sister.

== Playing career ==
Rafferty played senior inter-county football under five different Donegal managers—Mickey Moran, Brian McEniff, Brian McIver, John Joe Doherty and Jim McGuinness. He was often paired with Rory Kavanagh in midfield, though was often injured as well.

Rafferty was present in Jim McGuinness's teams of the 2010s, including in the 2011 Ulster Senior Football Championship (SFC) semi-final defeat of Tyrone, when he scored. He was unable to play in the 2011 Ulster SFC final because of an abductor muscle injury. A squad member during Donegal's 2012 All-Ireland SFC winning campaign, he accompanied the team on their end-of-year holiday to Dubai. However, he stepped away from the panel as its most senior member at the end of the 2012 season, having been dogged by injury over the previous twelve months.

== Honours ==
Donegal

- All-Ireland Senior Football Championship: 2012
- Ulster Senior Football Championship: 2011, 2012

St Eunan's

- Donegal Senior Football Championship: ...2007, 2008, 2009, 2012, 2014

Glencar Celtic

- Voodoo Venue Cup: 2019, 2020
