= Oldtown, Letterkenny =

Oldtown An Seanbhaile
- Townland
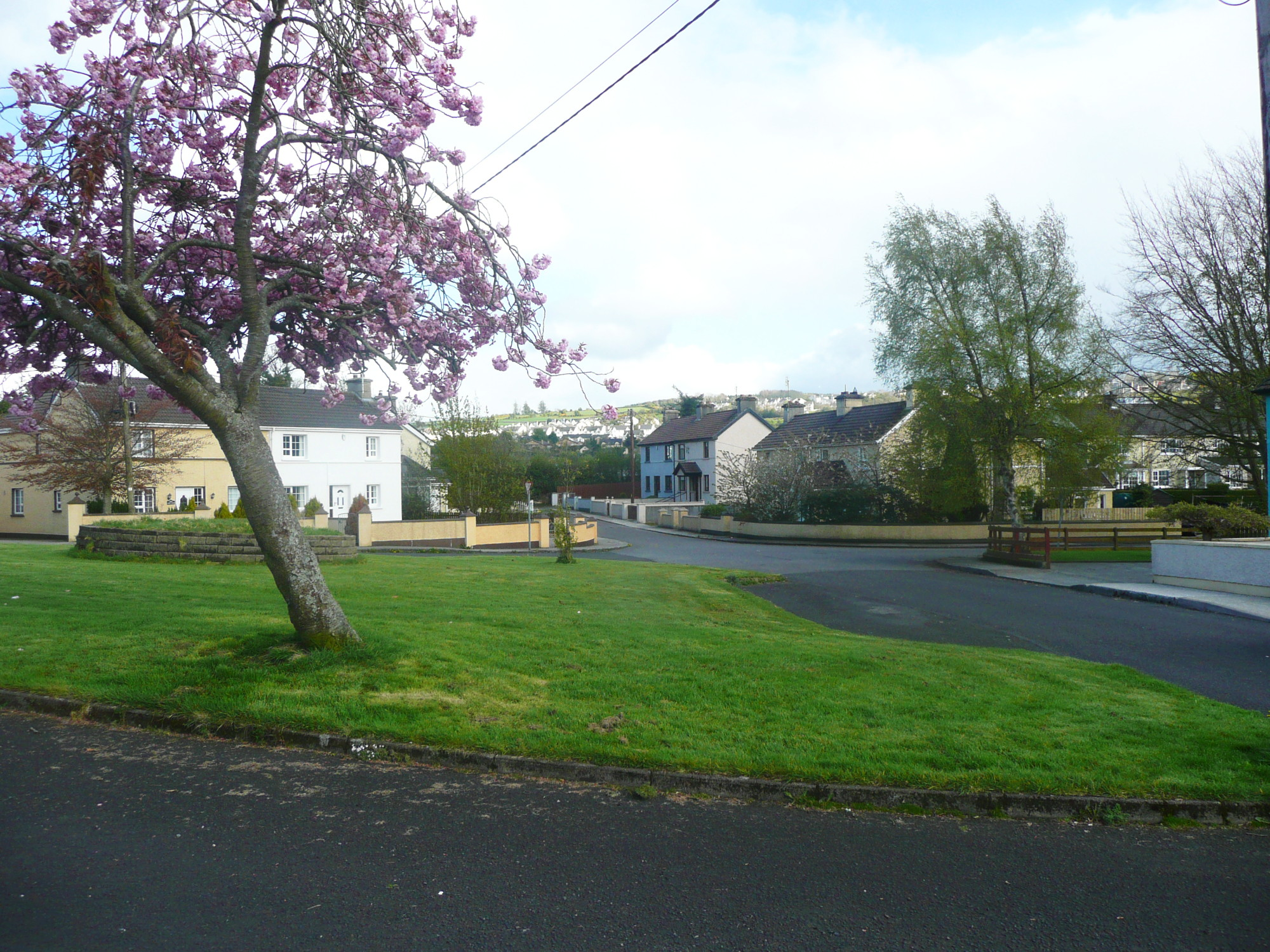
- Housing estate in Oldtown, Letterkenny

- Location in Ireland
- Coordinates: 54°57′24″N 7°43′13″W
- Country: Ireland
- Province: Ulster
- County: County Donegal

Government
  - Dáil Éireann: Donegal
- Elevation: 52 m (171 ft)
- Time zone: UTC+0 (WET)
  - Summer (DST): UTC-1 (IST (WEST))
- Area code: 074, +000 353 74
- Irish Grid Reference: C167119

Oldtown (Irish: An Seanbhaile) is a townland within the town of Letterkenny, County Donegal, Ireland. It is located in the parish of Conwal and Leck to the south of the River Swilly. As its name suggests, it is the oldest part of Letterkenny—being older than Letterkenny itself—and was the starting point of the area's development.

Oldtown is bordered by the townlands of Creeve to the west and Lismonaghan to the south. It may be entered from central Letterkenny on its northern flank via the Oldtown Bridge (for vehicular traffic) or Devlin Way (for pedestrians). The rail bridge (formerly used for trains run by the Lough Swilly Railway) is now disused, and is the only remaining evidence of Oldtown railway station.

Oldtown has a weak range of essential services, as it is primarily green spaces within housing developments; its residents mostly utilize services in the town centre, rather than Oldtown itself.

== History ==
Oldtown existed as a native Irish settlement before the Plantation of Ulster, which saw Patrick Crawford develop the market town on the other side of the Swilly at the Oldtown Bridge. The main food source of Oldtown's early inhabitants was fishing in the Swilly estuary, which flowed up to Conwal Cemetery. They also raised livestock on the hillside where Leck Graveyard is today.

Oldtown railway station was located on the Letterkenny & Burtonport Extension line. It opened on 9 March 1903, and closed for passengers and goods on 6 January 1947. There is no evidence of the station today, as a hotel occupies the site. However, an old rail bridge still crosses the River Swilly.

The old stone bridge, which gives residents passage to the town, was described as having "crumbling stone work" in 2019.

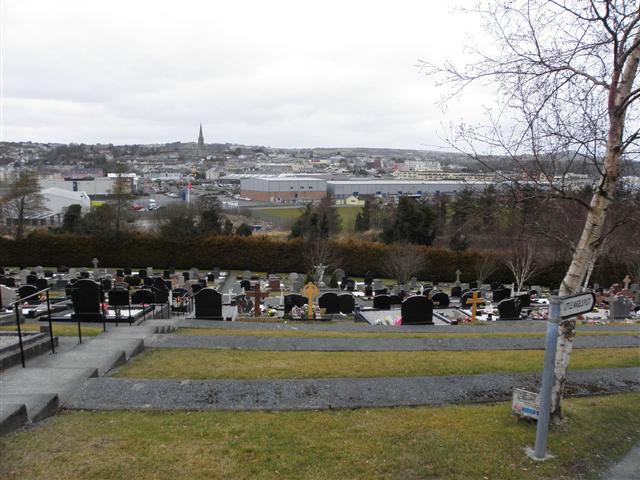
New Leck Cemetery, Oldtown, Letterkenny

The ruin of Old Leck Church is situated in Oldtown, as is the adjacent Old Leck Graveyard. This church, which was built c. 1500 fell out of use in the 1840s. The more modern New Leck Graveyard is located to the west of Old Leck Church.

== Administration ==
The townland of Oldtown falls within the electoral division of Letterkenny Rural.

The politician, Seán Maloney, lived in the area during his time as a Labour Party senator. Other politicians with links to the area include Dessie Larkin of Fianna Fáil, as well as his father James Larkin, founder of Independent Fianna Fáil.

There is a local residents' association.

== Amenities ==
The Hideout pub (later known as "The Snug") dates from the 19th century

Oldtown, which was described in 2020 as a "heavily populated" area, has been described by local politician Gerry McMonagle as having "a serious lack of facilities".

Small local stores include Oldtown Stores and Larkin's Shop. A Dunnes Stores outlet, the nearest department store to the area, is located on the opposite side of the Oldtown Bridge.

Former industries in the area include the Model Bakery. There was also the Gaeltex Factory. As of 2008, employers in the area included Dunnes Stores, NowDoc, Jungle King and The Hide Out Bar (also known as the Oldtown Inn). The latter pub, which was established in the 19th century, was later renamed The Snug.

== Housing ==
Residential areas in Oldtown include Brookcourt, Luí Na Gréine and Ros Suilighe. A 2009 report on the Jim Larkin Court and Gaeltex Drive blocks of flats noted a lack of facilities or play areas for children and families.

McNeely Villas, originally comprising 40 homes, was developed by Con Harvey and named in honour of the then recently deceased Bishop of Raphoe William MacNeely. It was built in 1969 and opened the following year. At its fiftieth anniversary in 2020, one-third of the original residents still lived there.

== Education ==
The nearest primary school is Scoil Colmcille. Secondary education for boys is provided by St Eunan's College, while the local girls secondary school is the Loreto Convent Secondary School. A "vocational school" is also available, though this is a significant walking distance from the area.

== Sport ==
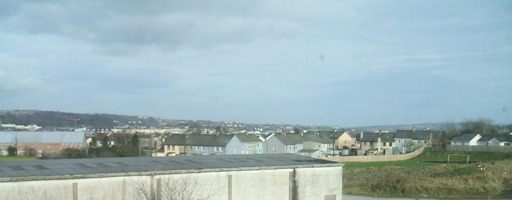
View over Oldtown, with Oldtown Celtic's home ground visible on the right

=== Soccer (association football) ===
Oldtown Celtic, founded in 1976, is the local soccer club. They play their home games at Oldtown Park. Their local rivals are Glencar Celtic. Letterkenny Rovers senior men's team compete in the Ulster Senior League and play their home games at Leckview Park, which is just across the river from Oldtown.

=== Golf ===
Golfing facilities opened in 1913 on a 47-acre (190,000 m2) nine-hole course at Crievesmith. The course was sold in 1965 for £3000 and the club moved to its current home at Barnhill. Due to the area's growing population, the land was developed into housing at the turn of the 21st century.

== Notable people ==
- Jim Clarke – footballer who played for Donegal
- Seán Maloney – served as a Labour Panel Senator in Seanad Éireann
- John Nee – actor
