= Menarys =

Northern Ireland-based department store chain

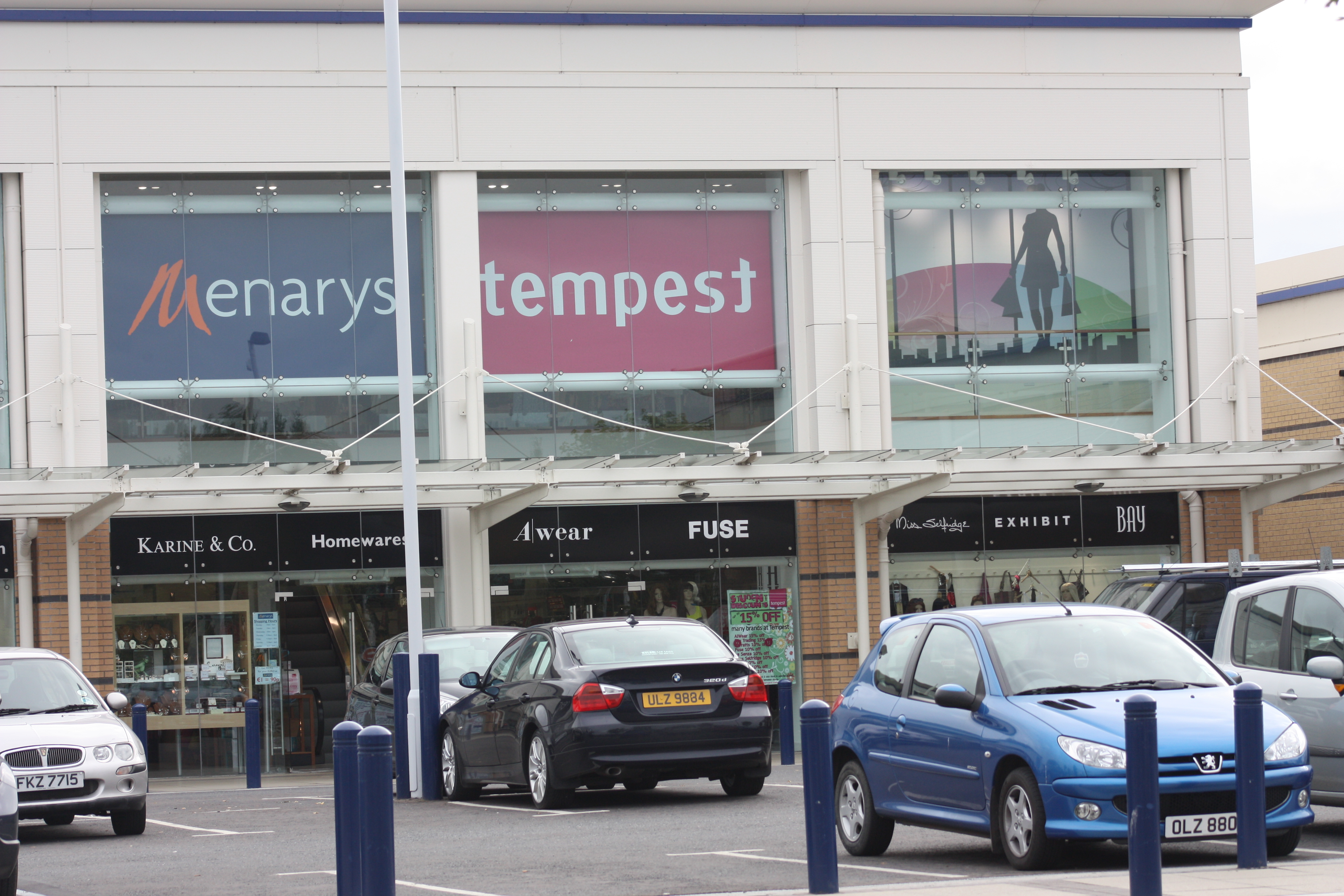
A now-defunct Menarys store in Craigavon, Northern Ireland in August 2009. This store closed in 2020, and was later converted into a two-story Poundland store in 2022.

Menarys is a Northern Ireland-based department store, operating twenty stores under their own name, as well as eleven stores under the 'Tempest' brand and an online store which launched in May 2010. Their head office is in Moygashel, Dungannon.

== History ==
The group was founded by Joseph Alexander, a draper in Cookstown in 1923, who added a store in Dungannon. Stores owned by Menary Brothers in the Craigavon area were acquired in the 1970s and this name was used for further expansion of the group. The name of Joseph Alexander was eventually removed from the Dungannon and Cookstown stores, although the cafe in the Dungannon, Cookstown, Lisburn, Bangor and Newtownards stores are called 'Joseph's' in his memory. The group's head office, situated at Moygashel, near Dungannon is named 'Alexander House'.

== Operations ==
Menarys takes a commission from the sales of concession operators, the largest of which is Philip Green's Arcadia, which accounts for around 15 per cent of all sales. It's understood to total at between £5-6m a year. By October 2019, the company had grown its sales to almost £20m, with pre-tax profits of more than £340,000.

On 22 April 2022, Menarys acquired the Houstons business, despite this, the Houstons store in Newry is not part of the deal but will remain open.

== Contents ==
Set up as a drapery, the store traditionally sold clothes and bedding. Menarys stores now offer household goods, cookware, lingerie, accessories, luggage and cosmetics in addition to these products, while Tempest is made up of high-street brands aimed at younger women's fashion.

== Locations ==
As of July 2026, Menarys has branches in 24 locations.
