= Letterkenny Regional Cultural Centre =

Regional Cultural Centre, Letterkenny
- Interactive map of the Regional Cultural Centre, Letterkenny area

General information
- Type: Arts Centre
- Architectural style: Glass, Oak
- Location: Letterkenny, County Donegal, Ireland
- Coordinates: 54.95389°N 7.73209°W
- Completed: July 2007
- Opened: 9 July 2007

Design and construction
- Architect: MacGabhann Architects
- Main contractor: McDermot & Trearty Limited

Website
- http://regionalculturalcentre.com

The Regional Cultural Centre (RCC) is a multidisciplinary contemporary arts centre in Letterkenny, County Donegal, Ireland. Operated by Donegal County Council, it presents a year-round programme of visual arts, music, film, literature and creative learning.

The centre, which opened in 2007, has commissioned new work by Irish and international artists and supported artist development and public engagement across the North West of Ireland. It has been described as a cultural beacon by The Irish Times.

== Opening ==
The centre while under construction

The centre opened on 9 July 2007. It was officially opened over one year later on 13 July 2008 by the Tánaiste, Mary Coughlan and Fianna Fáil chief whip, Claire Sharkey. The event coincided with the opening of an exhibition entitled The Story of Liam McCormack. Former Northern Ireland politician John Hume opened the exhibition.

== Construction ==
The centre was designed by Letterkenny-based MacGabhann Architects, who also designed the Letterkenny Town Council offices. It cost 5 million Euro to build, and is situated on the site of the old council offices.

== Facilities ==
The centre has an exhibition gallery and an auditorium with a standing capacity of 250, 150 retractable seats, and cinema facilities. There are also three workshop spaces on ground level with dance and drama floors located on the first floor, two dedicated digital media suites and two foyer art galleries.

== Past exhibitions ==
Previous exhibitions have included:

- Painting In The Noughties - Featuring Sean Scully, Jason Martin, Ian Davenport, Howard Hodgkin, Cecily Brown and Peter Davis amongst others
- Wild Geese – The Irish In America - An exhibition that celebrated the creativity of immigrant sons and daughters
- Deirdre Brennan - A collection of photographs by New York Times photographer Deirdre Brennan
- Open EV+A Open Award Winners - Featuring Eric Glavin, Tony Gunning, Eithna Joyce, Orla Keeshan and Susannah Vaughan
- The Great Southern Art Collection – Irish Art 1947 – 1974 - Featuring George Campbell, Norah McGuinness, Cecil King, Patrick Collins, Nano Reid, Patrick Scott,
- Gerard Dillon, Anne Madden, Camille Souter, Arthur Armstrong and Donald Teskey
- Centrefold – Ana Heinreich & Leon Palmer
- Sweet Dreams – Redmoon Theatre Group
- The House and The Tree - Eamon O'Kane
- Unknown Bown - Jane Brown
- The Picture is Still - Ann Hamilton, Marie Jo-Lafontaine, Philippe Parreno, Gillian Wearing and Gerardo Suter
- Liam McCormack – North by Northwest
- Diane Arbus
- James Fitzgerald (1899 to 1971)
- Victor Vasarely (1906 – 1997)
- The Táin – Louis le Brocquy
- James Dixon
- Chilean Arpilleras
- Temperance – Abigail O’Brien
- Modernism, Activism, Bauhaus – Constructive Tendencies in Hungary 1910–1930
- Paul Rooney – Reflections in 4 Lights
- László Moholy-Nagy – A Lightplay Black White Gray
- Lovely Weather - Major three year collaboration with Leonardo / OLATS: Arts & Science Foundation
- Rockwell Kent – A retrospective
- Dispatches – Tim Page
- Noughties but Nice: 21st Century Irish Art - Featuring Tom Molloy, Andrew Kearney, John Shinnors, Aideen Barry and Seamus Nolan
- ID – Imaging Donegal
- Seminal Sixties – Richard Hamilton
- Mhairi Sutherland - Arc of Fire
- this then – Locky Morris
- The Coercion of Substance – Samuel Walsh
- Altered Images Art & Disability Exhibition - Thomas Brezing, David Creedon, Alice Maher, Caroline McCarthy and Abigail O’Brien
- John Soffe – RCC Live 2007–2012
- Dermot Seymour.

== Music ==
Acts that have performed at the centre include:

- Moon Duo
- Ulrich Schnauss
- Oppenheimer
- Eduardo Niebla
- Greg Osby
- Rachel Unthank and the Winterset
- Pierre Bastien
- Son of Dave
- Martin Taylor
- Peggy Seeger
- Le Trio Joubran
- Liam Ó Maonlaí & Rónán Ó Snodaigh
- Henry McCullough
- Pierre Schryer and Oh My Darling
- The Wilders
- The Fox Hunt
- Brian Finnegan and Aidan O'Rourke
- Boubacar Traoré
- The Altered Hours
- ZZZ's
- Damo Suzuki
- Wild Rocket
- Jeffrey Lewis
- Moya Brennan
- Langhorne Slim & the Law
- In Their Thousands
- Martin Simpson
- Martin Carthy
- Liz Carroll
- The Capitol
- Petunia & the Vipers
- John Nee
- National Consensus

== Funding ==
The building of the centre was funded by the Department of Arts, Sport and Tourism, the International Fund for Ireland and Donegal County Council.
