= Sunday Journal =

Northern Irish newspaper

- Type: Weekly newspaper
- Format: Tabloid
- Owner(s): National World
- Editor: No Editor
- Founded: March 2004
- Political alignment: Nationalist
- Headquarters: Derry, Northern Ireland
- Circulation: 2,568 (December 2010-June 2011)
- Website: www.derryjournal.com

The Sunday Journal is a local newspaper published in Derry, Northern Ireland, that was launched in March 2004 as part of the Derry Journal newspaper group. The paper is the only local paper on the island of Ireland to be published on a Sunday, with a current circulation of 2,568. Although an edition of the paper is sold in County Donegal, the Derry edition of the Sunday Journal is still popular on the Inishowen Peninsula and in East Donegal. The paper is a sister publication of the bi-weekly Derry Journal and Donegal Democrat/Donegal People's Press in the Republic, through the National World company. The paper continues the mild nationalist editorial policy of the Derry Journal. The paper is staffed by Derry-born journalist, Andrew Quinn, and County Donegal-born journalist Ellen Barr.
