= Letterkenny People =

- Type: Weekly freesheet
- Format: Tabloid
- Owner(s): Iconic Newspapers
- Founded: 2000
- Headquarters: Letterkenny, County Donegal
- Circulation: Approx 5,000
- Price: Free

The Letterkenny People (formerly the Letterkenny Listener) is a weekly freesheet published in Letterkenny, County Donegal in northwest Ireland. The paper was originally distributed as the Letterkenny Listener in 2000 and took its current title in 2005. It is owned by Iconic Newspapers, which acquired Johnston Press's titles in Ireland in 2014. The Letterkenny People is not audited by the ABC but the company estimates its circulation at 5,000.
