= Letterkenny Library and Arts Centre =

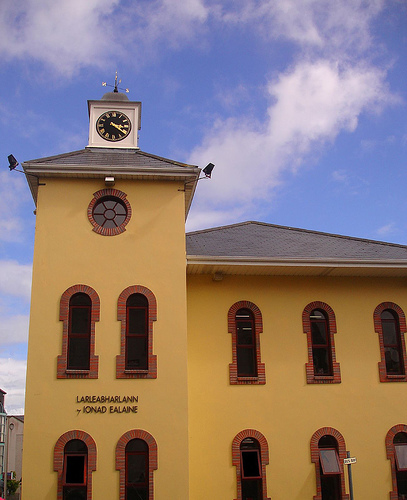
- 54.948457144708975°N 7.737708830085506°W
- Location: Letterkenny, County Donegal, Ireland
- Established: 1995

Access and use
- Population served: County Donegal

Other information
- Website: https://www.donegallibrary.ie/

The Letterkenny Library and Arts Centre is located on St. Oliver Plunkett Road in the County Donegal town. It is the central library in the county and is an integral part of Donegal County Council's arts provision. It is the first arts centre operated by a local authority in Ireland.

== History ==
The Centre opened in 1995 on the site of the demolished Literary Institute. The Literary Institute was built in 1876. It was donated to the town by Doctor Crerand from Illistrin and opened by the Lord Chancellor of Ireland, Lord O'Hagan. It was once a seminary used to train priests before St Eunan's College was built. It was also a school and a social club. It lay derelict for a number of years before demolition to make way for the new library.

== Facilities ==
Following renovations in May 1999, the premises in the Central Library building became a dedicated exhibition space, with occasional live performances. The Centre specialises broadly in visual arts, community arts, music, literature and film and represents a busy programme of exhibitions, performances and workshops in the Centre and other buildings. The Library is special in the fact that it has one of only two clock towers located in the town; the other being located a few metres away.

== Building layout ==
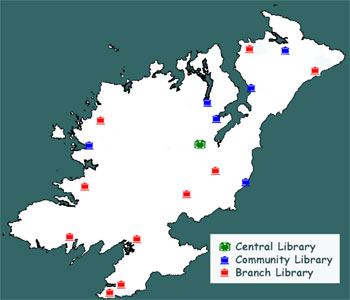
Library locations in County Donegal

As one enters the building, a door on the left reveals a set of stairs leading down to the arts centre in the basement. The arts centre is where regular exhibitions are heard and it has also been used to host youth drama workshops in the past.

The library itself is divided between the ground and upstairs floors of the building.

On the ground floor a vast array of adult books may be found as well as a children's section where silence is not so strictly enforced. A stairway overlooks the counter where computers are used to keep track of which books are being borrowed and by whom. Borrowed books may be returned by slipping them into a secure box outside the building should the borrower be in a bit of a hurry. Computers are also located on the ground floor which are easy to use for inquisitive locals and homesick tourists alike.

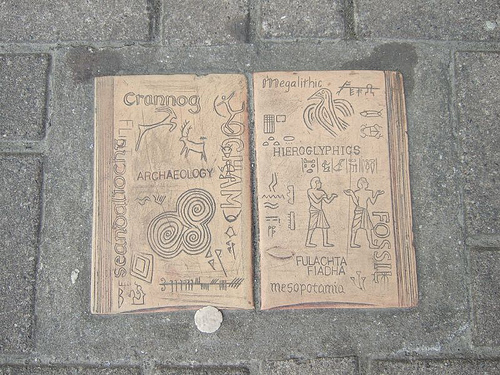
Detail of footpath outside the Library

Upstairs is a study area regularly used by students and other townspeople who wish to avail of its comfortable tables and chairs, relaxed airy quiet atmosphere, and thousands of reference books, maps, dictionaries and encyclopedias. This is also where the local archives are held, as well as a special area designated for adults only, who may wish to mull over the daily newspaper or a specialist magazine: Hot Press or TIME are among those on offer.

The building is monitored closely by CCTV.

== See also ==
- List of libraries in the Republic of Ireland
