= Scoil Colmcille, Letterkenny =

Scoil Colmcille
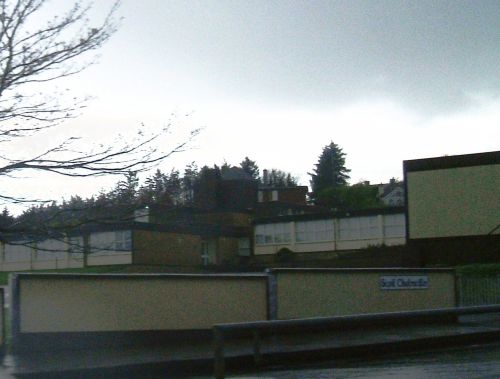
- Convent Road, Letterkenny, County Donegal; Ireland

Information
- Type: Primary school
- Religious affiliation: Roman Catholic
- Established: 1974
- Gender: Boys
- Enrollment: 342
- Language: English
- Colour
- Newspaper: The Green Eco
- Website: scoilcolmcillelk.ie

Scoil Colmcille is a Roman Catholic boys' primary school in County Donegal, Ireland, located on Letterkenny's Convent Road, across from the Loreto Convent.

== History ==
The school stands on the site of the town's first Gaelic football playing field. It was built in 1974. At the time of the new Scoil Colmcille's opening over 600 boys attended the school. By 1985 school numbers grew to over 700 and 23 teachers were employed.

Boys are housed at the rear end of the school and play in the back yard while girls are taught at the front entrance and play in the adjoining yard.

The school choir, led by Mr Frank Breslin, sang to a prime time national audience on The Late Late Toy Show in 1995.

An event, held at the school in January 2020, was attended by past pupils and locals. Among those in attendance were Leas-Cheann Comhairle Pat "the Cope" Gallagher (not a past pupil), Minister for Education and Skills Joe McHugh and former school principal Tom Redden. Those based abroad, such as Deputy Mayor of Islington Troy Gallagher and chef Conrad Gallagher delivered contributions by video. The event was brought to a close by fiddler Mairéad Ní Mhaonaigh.

== Environmental affairs ==
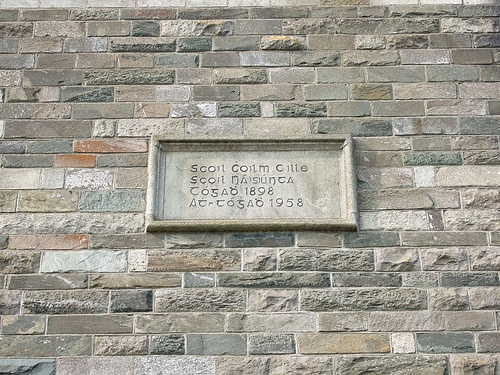
Plaque located on the wall of the old Scoil Colm Cille

The school has won the Green Flag award on a number of occasions. A school newspaper, The Green Eco, is produced irregularly.

== Sport ==
Gaelic footballers Rory Kavanagh and Kevin Rafferty are past pupils of the school, and visited the school in 2012 following victory in the 2012 All-Ireland Senior Football Championship Final.

== Staff ==
- Rory Kavanagh — the All-Ireland winning Gaelic footballer teaches at the school
- Anne McGowan — the community activist, noted for, among other things, chairing the Tidy Towns Committee that brought the award to Letterkenny for the first time in 2015, taught at the school from 1974 to 2012.

== Notable past pupils ==
- Conrad Gallagher — Michelin star-winning chef
- Pat Gibson — Quiz player who won the UK version of Who Wants to Be a Millionaire? (2004), Mastermind (2005), Brain of Britain (2006), and Mastermind Champion of Champions (2010)
- Rory Kavanagh — All-Ireland winning Gaelic footballer
- Kevin Rafferty — All-Ireland winning Gaelic footballer
