= Heatons =

Irish department store

Heatons Ltd

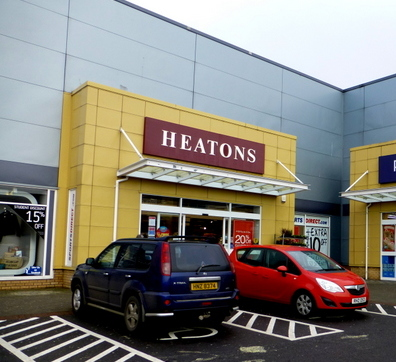
- A former Heatons store in Omagh
- Trade name: Heatons
- Industry: Retail
- Genre: Department store
- Founded: 1946 in Athlone
- Fate: Acquired by Sports Direct, with individual shops being converted to Sports Direct
- Headquarters: Tallaght, Ireland
- Number of locations: Over 50 at its peak
- Products: Clothing, homeward, sports goods
- Owner: Frasers Group
- Number of employees: Over 2,000
- Website: www.heatonsstores.com

Heatons was an Irish chain of department stores, established in 1946. It operated throughout the island of Ireland and sold fashion, homeware and sporting goods.

Heatons briefly held a franchise for British Home Stores, and also co-located some shops with Iceland during their first venture into Ireland.

By 2002, Heatons had 26 shops nationwide. That year, Sports Direct International (now Frasers Group) acquired a share in the business, and over the following years, it increased its share to 42.5% by at least 2007 and to 50% in 2010. Over the years, Sports Direct shops (usually branded as Sportsworld) began to be co-located with some of the Heatons shops, with 36 co-located sites existing by 2016.

Heatons was acquired by Frasers Group (formerly Sports Direct International) in 2016, with Sports Direct

Following the acquisition, any new Heatons shops were built with an attached Sports Direct section and existing Heatons shops were altered to additionally accommodate a Sports Direct section. Older shops had the Sports Direct section branded as "Sportsworld", a former named used in the UK but which continued to be used in Ireland for some time after, or "H. Sports".

Over the approximately five years following the acquisition, gradually all Heatons shops (from a peak of over 50) closed in their entirety to be converted into a Sports Direct shop alongside a smaller "Brand Max" section (another Frasers Group brand) selling some of what Heatons formerly sold. All former Heatons shops in Ireland have now closed and been converted to Sports Direct, with the shops in the Republic of Ireland being operated by Heatons Ltd (now a subsidiary of Sports Direct) and the shops in Northern Ireland being operated by Sports Direct's UK subsidiary.
