= Donegal People's Press =

Newspaper in Ireland

- Type: Weekly Newspaper
- Format: Compact
- Owner: Iconic Newspapers
- Editor: Michael Daly
- Founded: 1931
- Political alignment: Nationalist
- Headquarters: Letterkenny, County Donegal
- Circulation: Unknown; no longer ABC audited
- Website: www.donegaldemocrat.com

The Donegal People's Press (formerly Donegal People's Press and Derry and Tyrone News) is a weekly local newspaper in north County Donegal, Ireland. The paper is published every Tuesday in the north of the county, and a separate edition of the paper, with some alterations, is published in the south of the county, as the Tuesday edition of the Donegal Democrat. It is owned by Iconic Newspapers.

== History ==
The People's Press was first published in April 1931 and was based in Lifford, the county town of Donegal.

Champion Publications Limited was formed by W.F. Townsend and the Senator John MacLoughlin in 1932 for the specific purpose of taking over The Sligo Champion and The People's Press, established earlier that year in Lifford, Donegal and later renamed The Donegal People's Press.

The new company was registered on 1 August 1933.

In 1963 the paper adopted its shorter name and is now almost entirely integrated with the long established Donegal Democrat. The Democrat's base was traditionally in the south, but has expanded to become the only paper to be published across the entire county with its main Thursday broadsheet title.

In 1995, the People's Press, as part of the Donegal Democrat Group, was bought by the Derry Journal Group which in turn became part of Trinity Mirror. In 2004 the paper was purchased by the 3i holding company Local Press Ltd, and changed hands again in 2005, when Johnston Press took over Local Press. In 2014, Iconic Newspapers acquired Johnson Press' titles in the Republic of Ireland.
