= Derry Journal =

Northern Irish newspaper

Coordinates: 55.01212°N 7.3183°W

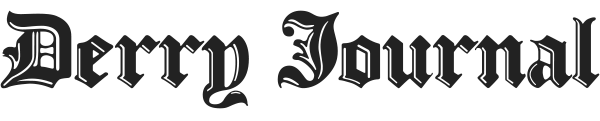
- Type: Twice weekly newspaper
- Format: Tabloid
- Owner: Media Concierge
- Editor: Brendan McDaid
- Founded: 3 June 1772
- Political alignment: Irish nationalism, British unionism
- Headquarters: Derry, Northern Ireland
- Circulation: Tuesday: 3,288; Friday: 3,936
- Website: www.derryjournal.com

The Derry Journal is a newspaper based in Derry, Northern Ireland, serving Derry as well as County Donegal in the Republic of Ireland. It is operated by Media Concierge. The paper is published on Tuesday and Friday and is a sister paper of the Sunday Journal, the only local newspaper published in Ireland on a Sunday. Founded 3 June 1772, it is the second oldest newspaper still in existence in Ireland.

== History ==
=== Establishment ===
The Derry Journal and General Advertiser was a four-page paper that cost one penny and was initially published on Wednesday and Saturday. In October of the same year as its launch, the paper's publication days were changed to Tuesday and Friday, and 1877 it became a daily paper for a brief time, however, this lasted just three months and the paper became a tri-weekly publication after three months (Monday, Wednesday, and Friday).

In its early days, the paper's editorial policy was that of the Protestant community who would become known as 'Unionists' in the following decades. However, in 1829 the paper endorsed Catholic Emancipation (equal rights for Catholics), leading to the then editor, William Wallen, to resign in protest to form the Londonderry Sentinel and North West Advertiser. The paper's position became more nationalist throughout the nineteenth century and was renamed the Derry Journal in 1880 (the nationalist name for the city). The next major change to the paper took place in January 1958 when the paper reverted to its current publishing schedule: Tuesday and Friday.

=== Banning ===
The Journal is also the only mainstream newspaper to have been banned on both sides of the border; firstly in 1932 and again in 1940. Under the McCarroll family, the paper was firmly nationalist. In January 1932, the Journal had been calling for Donegal voters to back Fianna Fáil candidates in the upcoming election and had been a strong critic of the Cumann na nGaedheal government. On Monday, 6 January 1932, Gardaí across Donegal told newsagents not to sell the paper until further notice, however, the source of the ban remains unknown and was rescinded almost immediately. It has been suggested that the decision to stop the selling of the paper was linked to a Fianna Fáil conference in Donegal that weekend, which received extensive coverage in the Monday edition published in Derry. The second ban was enforced in Northern Ireland by the Unionist government on 1 June 1940: it was also cut short and was removed by special dispensation four days later. This ban came again because of the paper's nationalist point of view – it had sided with the neutral Éire government, which Stormont believed amounted to not supporting the Allied war effort.

== Owners ==
In 1998, the McCarroll family sold the paper to what became Trinity Mirror, who sold it to Local Press Ltd, a 3i holding company, in January 2004. Johnston Press took ownership through the purchase of Local Press in November 2005 and Derry Journal is now operated by Media Concierge. Long-serving editor Arthur Duffy retired in 2019, and was replaced by Brendan McDaid.
