= Letterkenny =

Town in County Donegal, Ireland

Letterkenny Leitir Ceanainn (Irish)
- Town
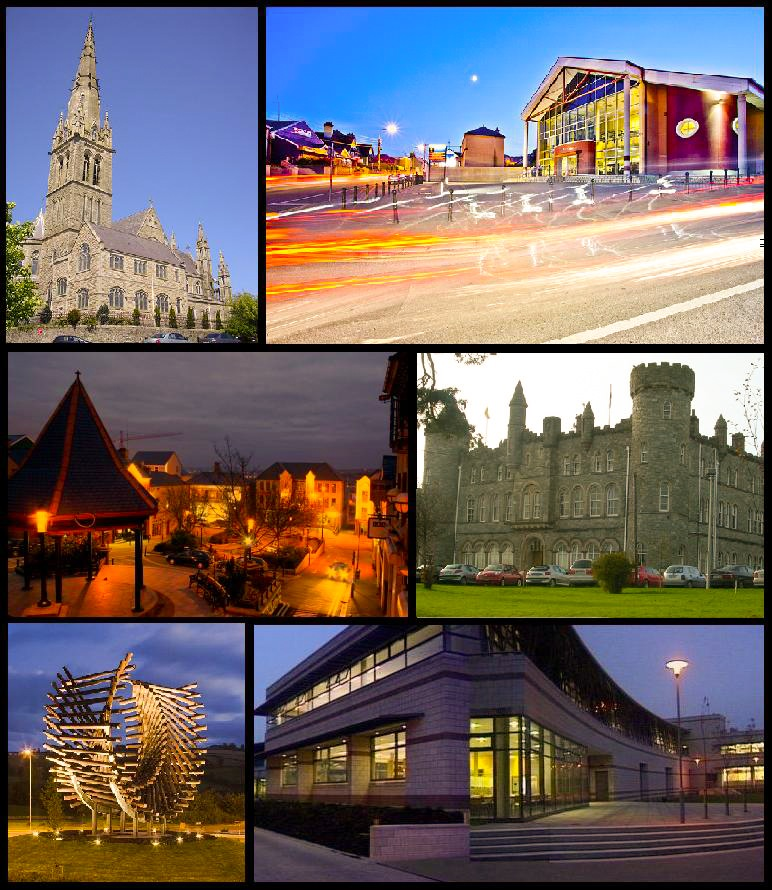
- From top, left to right: St Eunan's Cathedral, An Grianán Theatre, the Market Square, St Eunan's College, Polestar Roundabout (also known as the Port Roundabout), Letterkenny Institute of Technology.

- Coat of arms
- Nickname: the Cathedral Town
- Motto(s): Ubique Urbem Reminiscar "Remember the town wherever I am"
- Location in Ireland
- Coordinates: 54.9566°N 7.7203°W
- Country: Ireland
- Province: Ulster
- County: County Donegal
- Baronies: Kilmacrenan and Raphoe North
- Dáil constituency: Donegal

Area
  - Total: 15.5 km^{2} (6.0 sq mi)
- Elevation: 52 m (171 ft)

Population (2022 census)
  - Total: 22,549
  - Density: 1,450/km^{2} (3,770/sq mi)
- Irish Grid Reference: C171121
- Dialing code: 074 91// 0035374

Letterkenny (Irish: Leitir Ceanainn Irish pronunciation: [ˈl̠ʲɛtʲəɾʲ ˈcanˠən̠ʲ], meaning "hillside of the O'Cannons"), nicknamed the Cathedral Town, is a large town in County Donegal, Ireland, on the River Swilly in the north-west of the Ulster province. Along with the nearby city of Derry, Letterkenny is a regional economic gateway for the north-west of Ireland.

Letterkenny began as a market town at the start of the 17th century, during the Plantation of Ulster. A castle once stood near where the Cathedral of St Eunan and St Columba, County Donegal's only Catholic cathedral, stands today. Letterkenny Castle, built in 1625, was located south of Mt Southwell on Castle Street. County Donegal's largest third-level institution, Atlantic Technological University (ATU) Letterkenny, is located in the town, as are St Eunan's College, Highland Radio, and a Hindu temple. Letterkenny was also the original home of Oatfield Sweet Factory, a confectionery manufacturer; the factory closed and was demolished in 2014. In 1798, Theobald Wolfe Tone was arrested at Laird's Hotel in the town. In 2015, Letterkenny was judged as the tidiest town in Ireland.

== Toponymy ==

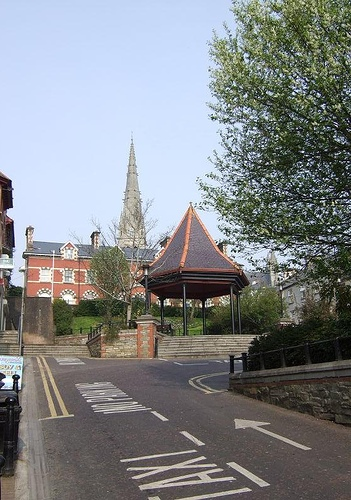
Above: The Market Square district c. 1900;
Below: The Market Square district c. 2007

Letterkenny takes its name from the Irish Leitirceanainn, meaning "Hillside of the O'Cannons" – the O'Cannons being the last of the ancient chieftains of Tír Conaill. While no evidence of forts or castles belonging to the O'Cannon clan exists in the Letterkenny district, eight miles west of Letterkenny is located Doon Rock, believed by some to be an ancient inauguration site of the O'Cannon Kings.

The O'Cannon dynasty is descended from Conn of the Hundred Battles and Niall of the Nine Hostages, two of Ireland's ancient High Kings. The O'Cannons have been described as 'Ancient Princes of Tír Connaill' and 'Valiant Chiefs'. Their 350-year dynasty in Tír Connaill ended in 1250. Their ancient territory is recorded as being in Tír Aeda (now the barony of Tirhugh) in what is now South Donegal. After the deaths of Ruairí Ó Canannain (Rory O'Cannon) and his son Niall Ó Canannain in 1250, the sept declined greatly in power. Brian Ó Néill (Brian O'Neill) died ten years later in 1260; he had supported an Ó Canannain claimant to Tír Conaill, i.e., to the Kingdom of Tír Conaill (Tirconnell). However, the O'Cannon Clan remained subservient to the O'Donnell Clan, the Kings of Tír Chonaill, from the early thirteenth century onwards, after Gofraid O'Donnell helped the English defeat the O'Cannons in 1250. The personal name Canannain is a diminutive of Cano, meaning 'wolf cub'. Canannain was fifth in descent from Flaithbertach mac Loingsig (died 765), high-king of Ireland; they were the descendants of Niall of the Nine Hostages (Irish: Niall Noigiallach), who died c. 405 A.D., by his son Conall Gulban, who gave his name to Tír Conaill, the 'Land of Conall', now County Donegal.

By the early 17th century, the name Uí Canannain had been anglicised to O'Cannon. Further anglicisation took place during the Penal Laws in the late 18th and early 19th centuries and the name in Co. Dun na nGall became Cannon. In the early 1880s, just 200 families bearing the Cannon surname lived in County Donegal, who were mainly tenant farmers. The Cannons/O'Canannains were of the ancient sept of Cenell Conaill, a branch of the northern Uí Néill and descended from Ruaidrí ua Canannain (died 30 November 950), King of Cenel Conaill, and grandson of Canannain, who flourished in the second half of the 9th century. The site of the ancient seat of the Ó Canannain was near Letterkenny (the largest town of County Donegal, only since the 1950s), which is said to represent the countryside of the O'Cannons (English translation).

== History ==
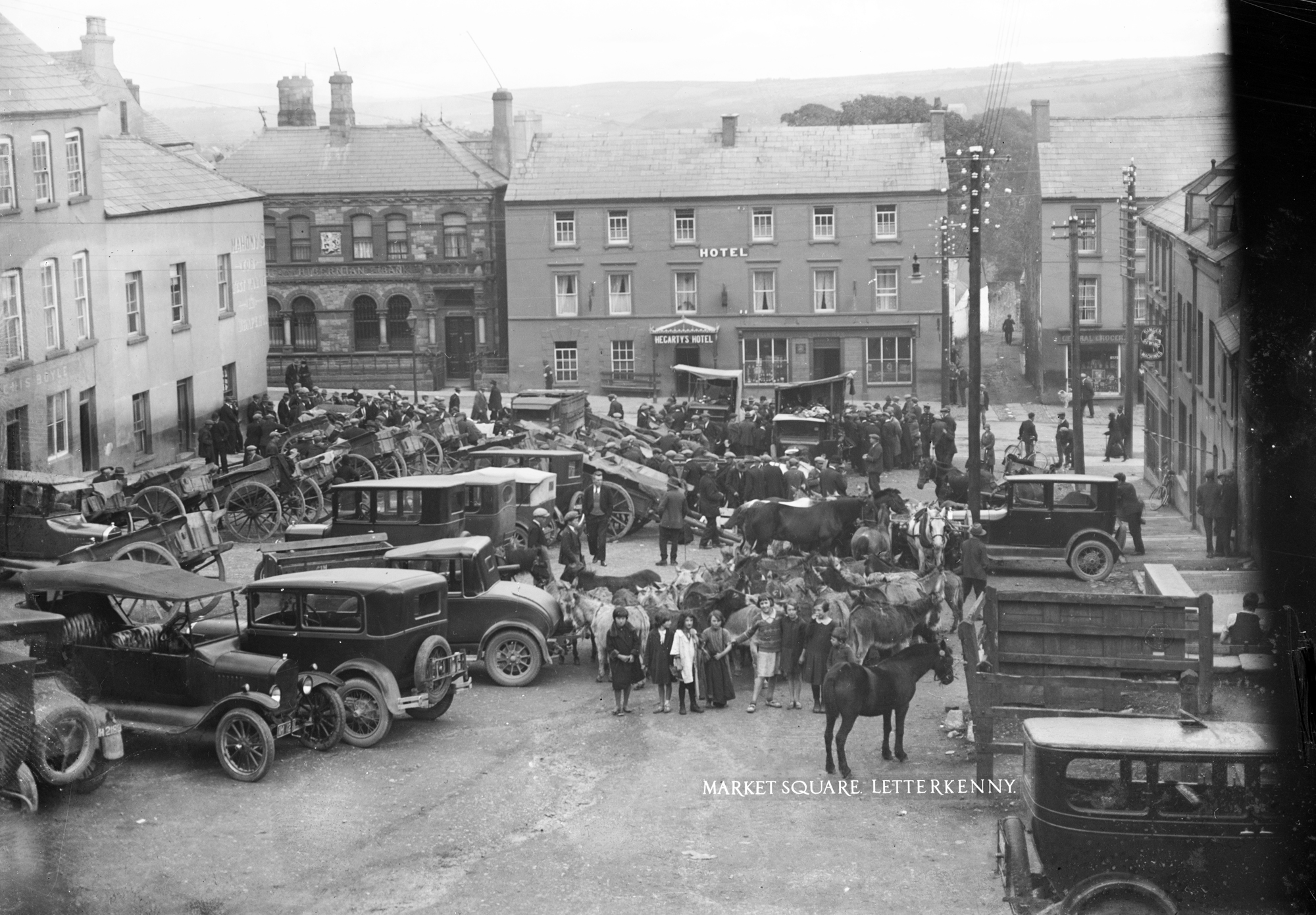
Traffic at the Market Square in 1928

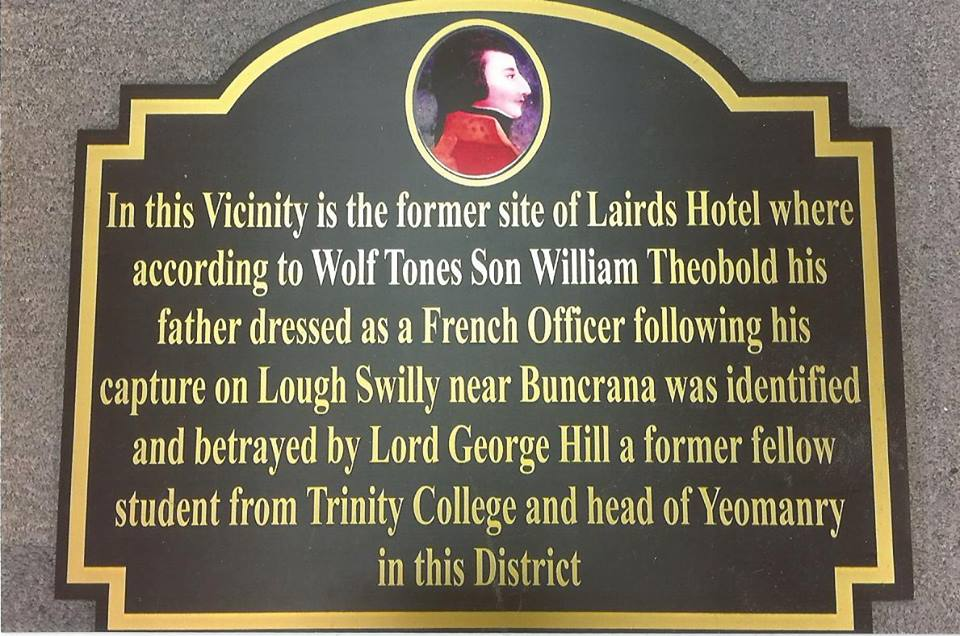
Sign in Letterkenny commemorating the arrest of Wolfe Tone

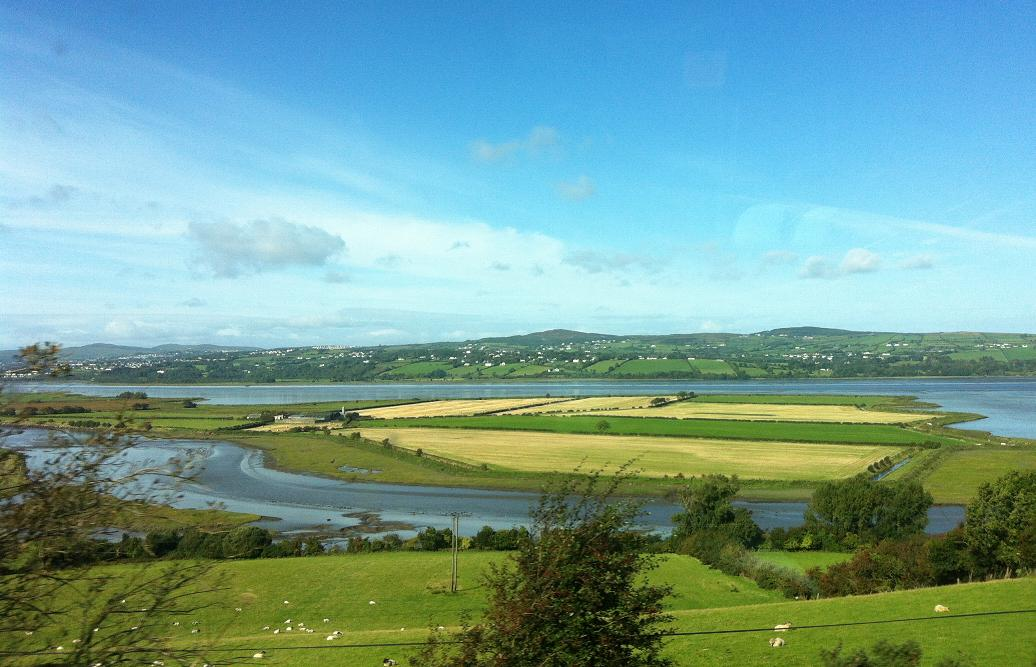
The mouth of the River Swilly at Lough Swilly in Letterkenny

The modern town of Letterkenny began as a market town at the start of the 17th century, during the Plantation of Ulster. It may have been established on the site of an earlier Gaelic settlement. It was the first crossing point of the River Swilly. In the recent past, Letterkenny was a largely agricultural town, surrounded by extensive cattle and sheep grazing on what was then untilled hillside, at a time when Conwal (3 km west of Letterkenny) was the ecclesiastical and seaport centre. The waters of the Atlantic had not yet retreated from the basin of the Swilly, whose estuary at that time extended up almost as far as New Mills; proof of this may be found in those alluvial flatlands between the Oldtown and the Port Road.

Rory O'Cannon, the last chieftain of the O'Cannon Clan, was killed in 1248. Godfrey O'Donnell succeeded Rory O'Cannon as King of Tír Conaill. He engaged the Norman lord Maurice FitzGerald, 2nd Lord of Offaly in battle at Credan in the north of what is now County Sligo in 1257, in which both were badly wounded – Fitzgerald immediately fatally so. Godfrey (also dying from his wounds) retired to a crannóg in Lough Beag (Gartan Lake). O'Neill of Tír Eoghain — taking advantage of Godfrey's fatal illness — demanded submission, hostages, and pledges from the Cenél Conaill since they had no strong chieftain since the wounding of Godfrey. Godfrey summoned his forces and led them himself, although he had to be carried on a litter (stretcher). O'Neill and his men were completely defeated by the Swilly in 1258. Godfrey died, however, after the battle near where the town of Letterkenny is today. He was buried in Conwal Cemetery. A cross-shaped coffin slab marks his grave to this day.

The receding of the waters of the Atlantic eastwards enabled progress, and with the building of bridges, etc., the town of Letterkenny started to take the shape it has today. In the wake of the Plantation of Ulster (which began around 1609), when a 4 square kilometres (990 acres) area was granted to a Scotsman, Patrick Crawford, the compact community formed.

The honour of formally launching the town fell to Sir George Marbury, who married Patrick Crawford's widow — Crawford having died suddenly while on a return visit to his native Scotland. Initially, there were possibly fifty simple habitations sited where the Oldtown is situated today.

The main streets, though now suffering traffic congestion, were simple pony tracks used by the hill farmers to come to the markets. The markets — started by Patrick Crawford with only a few animals — grew into much busier markets that are not present today.

An ancient castle once stood near where the Cathedral of St Eunan and St Columba stands today. Letterkenny Castle, built in 1625, was located south of Mt Southwell on Castle Street. No remains of the castle exist today.

During the Irish Rebellion of 1798, on 12 October, a French squadron transporting 3,000 troops, including Wolfe Tone, attempted to land in County Donegal near Lough Swilly. They were intercepted by a larger Royal Navy squadron and surrendered after a three-hour battle without ever landing in Ireland. After Tone was captured he was held for a short time at Laird's Hotel (opposite the Market Square) in the Main Street of Letterkenny before being transferred to the nearby Derry Gaol. He was later tried by a court-martial in Dublin and found guilty. His death through suicide occurred in prison.

In 1824, when the first description of Letterkenny as a modern town was written, it was stated that: "Within half a mile is the Port of Ballyraine, whither vessels of 100 tons bring iron, salt and colonial produce and whence they export hides and butter". Nothing remains now except the warehouses with the example of 19th-century warehouse architecture.

Letterkenny achieved town status in the early 1920s following the partition of Ireland. When the Irish punt replaced the British pound sterling in County Donegal in 1928, many Irish banks that had been previously located in Derry (in the new Northern Ireland) opened branches in Letterkenny.

== Geography ==
=== Climate ===
Climate data for Letterkenny is recorded at Malin Head in the far northern tip of the county. Malin Head's climate is classified as temperate oceanic (Köppen Cfb) and is significantly milder than some other locations in the world at a similar latitude; this is due to the station's position near the Atlantic Coast and exposure to the warmth of the Gulf Stream. Due to its northerly latitude, Malin Head experiences long summer days and short winter days. Summers are cool with temperatures rarely exceeding 25 °C (77 °F), while winters are relatively mild with daytime temperatures rarely dropping below 0 °C (32 °F). Extreme heat is very rare; however, the town can on occasion receive extreme cold from the Arctic, where temperatures drop several degrees below 0 °C (32 °F). Snow is relatively uncommon, and the station receives, on average, 20 days of recorded snowfall per year, the vast majority of this occurring between December and March. Humidity is high year-round, and rainfall is spread quite evenly throughout the year, with winter months receiving the rainiest days.

Climate data for Letterkenny, Donegal (1981–2010)
Month	Jan	Feb	Mar	Apr	May	Jun	Jul	Aug	Sep	Oct	Nov	Dec	Year
Mean daily maximum °C (°F)	8 (46)	8 (46)	10 (50)	12 (54)	14 (57)	16 (61)	17 (63)	18 (64)	16 (61)	13 (55)	10 (50)	8 (46)	12.2 (54.0)
Mean daily minimum °C (°F)	4 (39)	3 (37)	4 (39)	6 (43)	8 (46)	10 (50)	12 (54)	12 (54)	11 (52)	9 (48)	6 (43)	4 (39)	7.5 (45.5)
Average precipitation mm (inches)	117.4 (4.62)	84.8 (3.34)	85.9 (3.38)	63.1 (2.48)	56.9 (2.24)	69.1 (2.72)	76.8 (3.02)	93.2 (3.67)	91.8 (3.61)	118.4 (4.66)	104.5 (4.11)	114.2 (4.50)	1,076.1 (42.35)
Average precipitation days	18	13	15	12	11	11	14	14	14	17	17	16	172
Average snowy days	5.1	5.2	3.4	1.6	0.1	0	0	0	0	0	1.1	3.8	20.3
Mean monthly sunshine hours	38.2	65.0	94.1	152.9	201.5	166.0	142.7	140.1	112.2	80.6	44.3	34.1	1,271.7
Source 1: ECA&D
Source 2: Met Éireann

=== Architecture ===
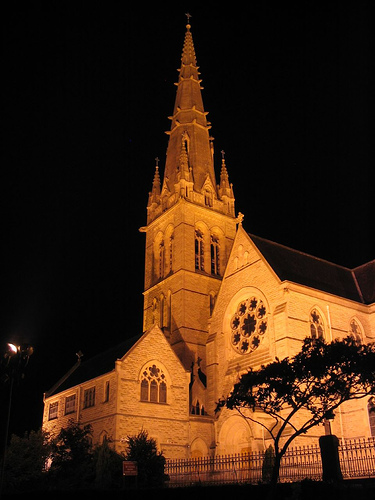
The Cathedral of St Eunan and St Columba, the seat of the Roman Catholic Diocese of Raphoe, dominates the Letterkenny skyline.

Several of Letterkenny's more notable buildings were built in the early 1850s or earlier. These include educational and ecclesiastical buildings. The town's tallest building is the Cathedral of St Eunan and St Columba, which was completed in 1901. The cathedral was designed by William Hague from County Cavan. It is built in a light Victorian neo-Gothic version of the French 13th-century Gothic style. Located opposite the cathedral, at the junction of Church Street with Cathedral Square, is Conwal Parish Church, parts of which date from the 17th century.

Another dominant building in the town is St Eunan's College. It is a three-storey castellated structure, built in 1904 in the Edwardian variant of the neo-Hiberno-Romanesque style. It has four turreted round towers and flying buttresses which are modelled on the nearby cathedral.

Other architecturally notable buildings can be found at Mount Southwell Terrace, which is located at the top of Market Square, just off Castle Street. This Georgian-style terrace of red brick was built in 1837 by Lord Southwell. The terrace contains five Georgian houses and served as a holiday home for Maud Gonne when she stayed here while holidaying in Donegal. St Conal's Hospital is a large Victorian neo-Georgian structure located on the Kilmacrennan Road in the town. While the oldest parts of the building date from the 1860s, the hospital's chapel was built in the neo-Norman style in the 1930s.

The Donegal County Museum is housed in the old workhouse on High Road, which was completed in May 1843.

In later years, Letterkenny has seen more modern architectural developments. The new Letterkenny Town Council offices, known locally as "The Grasshouse", were designed by Donegal-based MacGabhann Architects. The building features a sloping grass roof situated above a broad band of aluka matt cladding and a runway-like ramp to the first-floor concourse. A 2002 article in The Sunday Times reportedly described it as a "building of international interest". The town council had previously been based in a house known as "Murrac-a-Boo", off the Port Road, which was badly damaged in a fire in 2004 and subsequently demolished.

== Demographics ==
Historical population
Year	Pop.	±%
1911	3,691	—
1926	3,631	−1.6%
1936	4,080	+12.4%
1946	4,410	+8.1%
1951	4,622	+4.8%
1956	4,561	−1.3%
1961	4,679	+2.6%
1966	4,967	+6.2%
1971	5,568	+12.1%
1979	7,537	+35.4%
1986	9,864	+30.9%
1991	10,726	+8.7%
1996	11,996	+11.8%
2002	15,231	+27.0%
2006	17,586	+15.5%
2011	19,588	+11.4%
2016	19,274	−1.6%
2022	22,549	+17.0%
Source: CSO

The population of Letterkenny in 1841 was 2,161.

Letterkenny is the largest town in County Donegal. Despite having a long tradition of emigration that continued until the early 1990s, Letterkenny has since had net immigration. The recent immigrants include people from Central Europe, Africa, and Asia. This is reflected in the recent growth of immigrant restaurants and shops, including Chinese and Indian restaurants, as well as specialised shops run by and providing goods for Africans, Asians, South Americans, and Central Europeans. Letterkenny is home to one of Ireland's few Hindu temples.

The figures for the ethnic and cultural background of people in the state in 2006 revealed that 16% of Letterkenny's population are non-nationals. The figures also show that most of Donegal's non-national population lives in the town. Of the town's total population, 2,709 are non-nationals. According to the 2006 census, 4,957 people have a disability illness, 640 people have a registered disability, 537 have a chronic illness, while 345 suffer from a psychological or an emotional condition. The 2006 census also revealed that there were 199 travellers living within the town's environs.

== Education ==
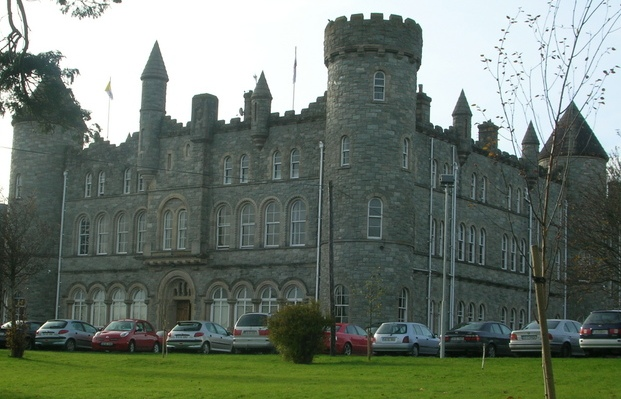
St Eunan's College

Primary and secondary education in the town is organised similarly to the rest of Ireland. There are 5 primary schools in Letterkenny, including Scoil Colmcille and Woodland School, while there are 4 secondary schools.

Of the four secondary schools, the most noteworthy is St Eunan's College — a day school and former boarding school located on Sentry Hill close to the Glencar district of Letterkenny, just northwest of its centre. The College, as it is known locally to distinguish it from the cathedral and GAA club, is named after Adomnán or Eunan (the Abbot of Iona who was native to Tír Chonaill, mainly modern County Donegal, and is patron saint of the Roman Catholic Diocese of Raphoe).

Coláiste Ailigh is a Gaelcholáiste (a secondary school with the stated purpose of providing education through the Irish language). It opened in 2000. The Loreto Convent Secondary School, adjacent to St Eunan's Cathedral, is more than 150 years old.

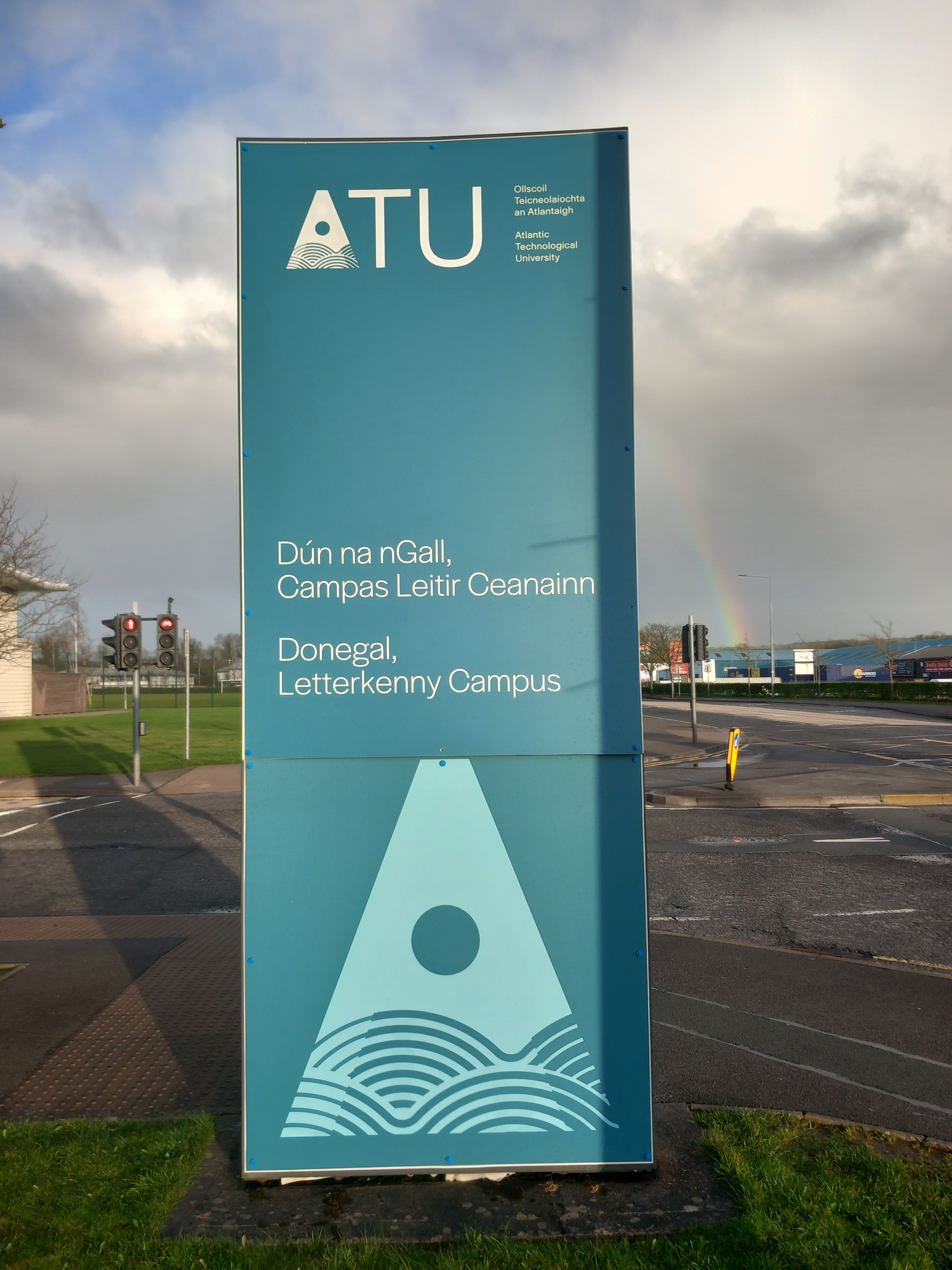
ATU, Letterkenny Campus

The ATU Donegal Letterkenny (formerly Letterkenny Institute of Technology) (LYIT; known locally as The Regional and The IT), which is situated east of the town centre on the Port Road, is a training centre for technicians, offering courses in engineering, information technology, materials science, design, business and nursing. The institute is one of the smaller places of third level education in the historic province of Ulster, with a lower student intake than other colleges such as Belfast Metropolitan College and the regional colleges of the North West, South, South East and South West, all of which themselves are smaller than the universities in Northern Ireland - Queen's University Belfast and Ulster University.

== Economy ==
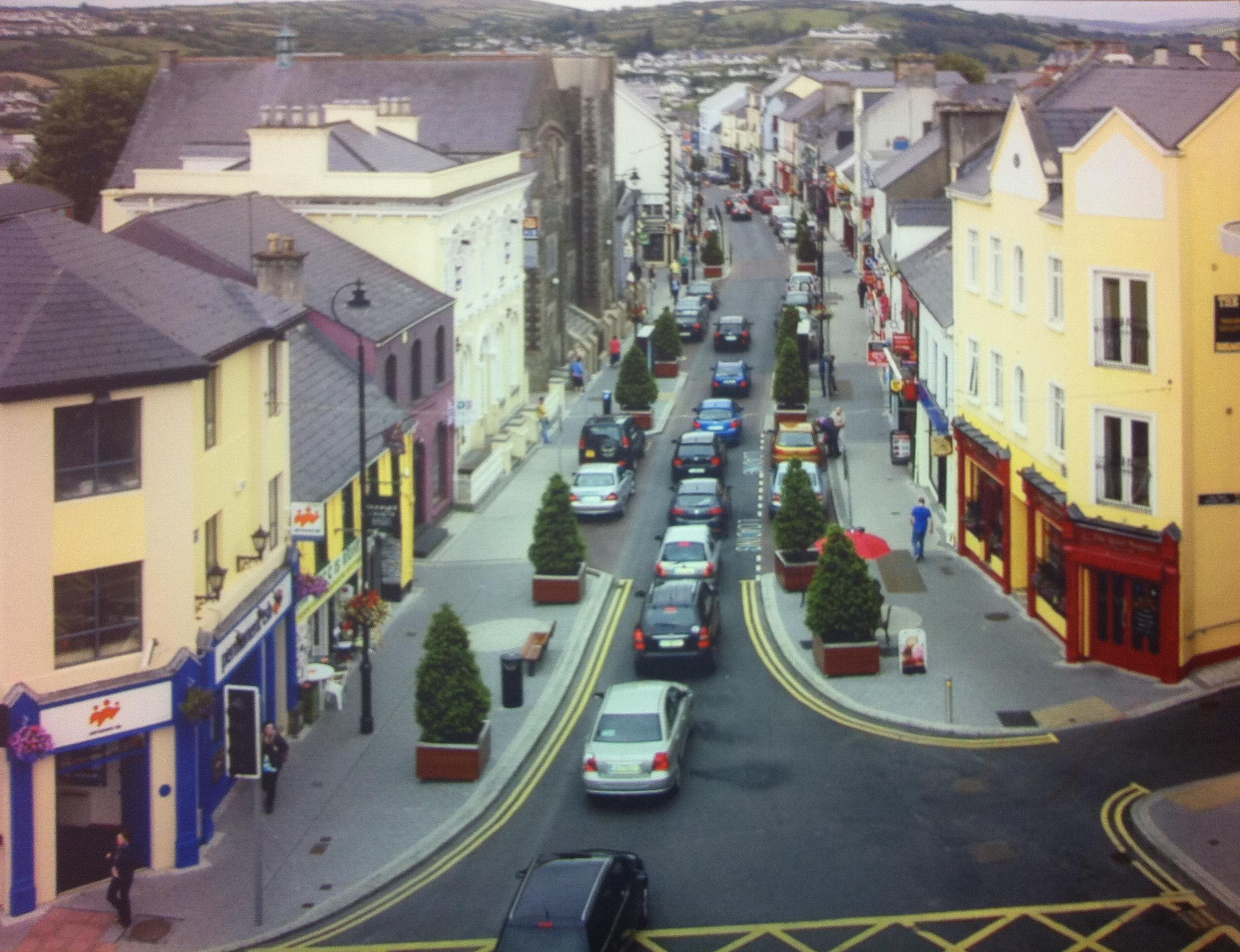
Letterkenny Main Street

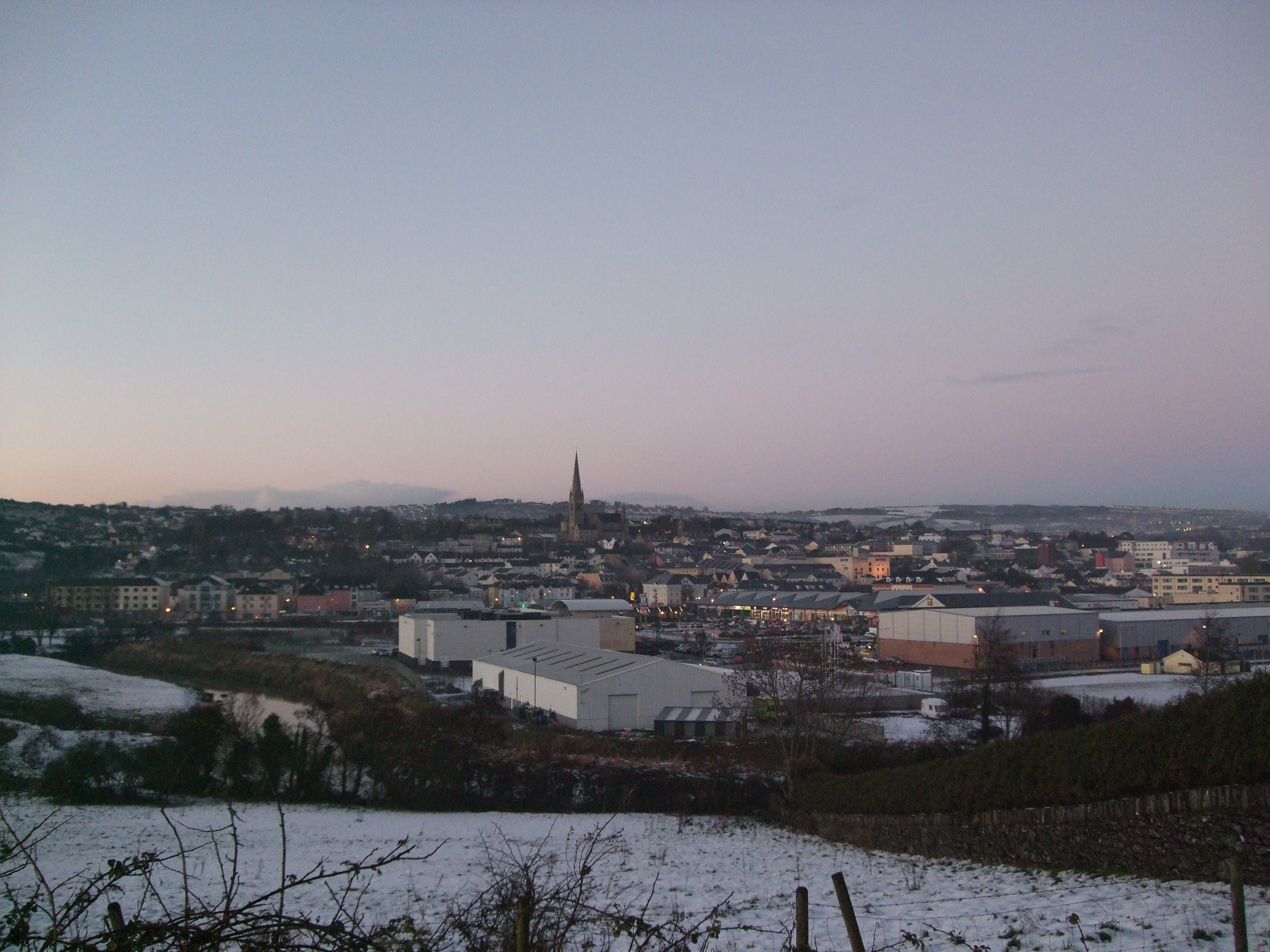
Letterkenny skyline

Letterkenny Chamber of Commerce and Industry was founded in 1965. It is the only Donegal Chamber of Commerce affiliated to Chambers Ireland, meaning it "provides input into national and regional lobbying policies", according to its website.

In February 2020, the Donegal News reported that the "number of vacant commercial properties in Letterkenny had risen by 8.7 per cent by the end of [the previous year], meaning that out of 720 recorded commercial premises in the town, 134 are vacant".

=== Retail ===
The retail trade in Letterkenny includes modern shopping centres and family-owned local shops – often providing handmade crafts.

Many High Street stores operate in Letterkenny. The town is the northwest region's major shopping centre and helps to serve outlying areas including rural County Donegal and Derry. The three main shopping malls are the Courtyard Shopping Centre, the Letterkenny Retail Park, and the Letterkenny Shopping Centre, the latter being the oldest. Built in 1984, it is the largest shopping centre in County Donegal, and was the first of several such complexes in Letterkenny. While originally built on the outskirts of the town, urban expansion means it now lies in the town proper. Letterkenny has been identified as one of Europe's fastest-growing towns by business owners. The centre remained largely unchanged until 2004, when the centre was expanded, and new lighting, flooring and decor were added. More retail units were constructed along with the expansion of the Tesco outlet and thus becoming "one of the Major developments in Ireland". These centres feature numerous international and Irish chains such as Tesco, Penney's (Primark) and others. There are also many other small centres such as the Glencar Shopping Centre and the Market Centre.

Previously, Letterkenny's Main Street served as the main shopping area in the town, but trade has now shifted further afield, expanding the town in the process. Main Street is home to many older establishments, including R. McCullagh Jewellers (dating from 1869), Magees Pharmacy (dating from 1928) and Ernest Speer Clothing Store. Newer shopping areas in the town include the Letterkenny Retail Parks on Pearse Road and Canal Lane. Smaller streets such as Church Street and Castle Street have grown in recent years with businesses such as bakeries, pharmacies and fashion outlets having been opened. The Market Square has also attracted fresh business.

In August 2012, two winning Lotto tickets using the same numbers for the same draw were bought at two different locations in the town – Mac's Mace on the High Road and The Paper Post on Main Street. The occurrence made national news. A spokesperson for Lotto HQ in Dublin said it was the first time this had happened.

=== Industry ===
In April 1970, the Donegal News reported that local politicians acknowledged "a very real problem" in attracting industrialists to come to the town, even despite grants being available to do so.

The town's major employers include the Letterkenny University Hospital, Pramerica, Optum Health Care, and the Department of Social and Family Affairs, the latter having decentralised to the town in 1990, following a government decision to relocate 200 civil service jobs from Dublin.

Letterkenny is at the centre of industry in the northwest of Ireland. Eircom, Boston Scientific, and UnitedHealth Group (Optum) are significant employers in the region. As the main commercial centre of north Donegal, Letterkenny also has a host of financial service institutions, legal firms, and small businesses.

Pramerica was established in Letterkenny in 2000. It was a business and technology operations subsidiary of U.S.-based Prudential Financial Inc. (NYSE: Pru)and grew to over 2,000 employees before being taken over by Tata Consultancy Services in 2020. Prudential still retains some staff on site as PGIM.

There has been a significant decline in the manufacturing base, while employment has grown in the service sector. Since 2002 there has been a significant expansion in the retail sector. Allied to this growth has been the development of the cultural infrastructure. This includes the opening of An Grianán Theatre and the development of a new arts centre.

Letterkenny was also home to the confectionery manufacturer Oatfield. It was based at the entrance to Ballyraine, near the town's central area. The factory was demolished in the summer of 2014. Rockhill Barracks was once a major contributor to the local economy but closed in January 2009 due to military cuts. The Rambling Man distillery was located at the Eastend until 1976, and was not named after its owner Stephen Rambling.

The economy in the town is strongly dependent on cross-border trade, and economic growth is somewhat dependent on the currency exchange rate between the Euro and the British Pound.

=== Media ===
Letterkenny receives all of the national television stations on the Saorview DTT platform from the local Letterkenny transmitter. Due to its proximity to Derry City and Strabane in Northern Ireland, the town and its surrounding areas have been able to receive overspill analogue television signals from the Derry City transmitter since December 1957 and the Strabane transmitter since February 1963. The town can also receive satellite services and broadband television services.

The regional radio station is Highland Radio which broadcasts from the town to north, east, and west County Donegal, West Tyrone and the City of Derry. It began broadcasting in 1990.

Letterkenny is home to several media companies. The main regional newspaper in the town and county is the Donegal Democrat (owned by the Derry Journal), whose offices also print two other titles every week – the Donegal People's Press on Tuesday and also Donegal on Sunday. Another local paper is the Derry People/Donegal News (popularly known locally as the Derry People). It is distributed on a Friday, as well as having a Monday edition. The Milford-based Tirconaill Tribune, printed in Letterkenny, is distributed throughout the county. The town also produces two freesheet newspapers, the Letterkenny People (previously the Letterkenny Listener), which is distributed on a Thursday, and the Letterkenny Post, which is printed on a Thursday night for Friday circulation. The Derry Journal, based in Derry itself, is also a major newspaper in the town and its environs.

=== Local government ===
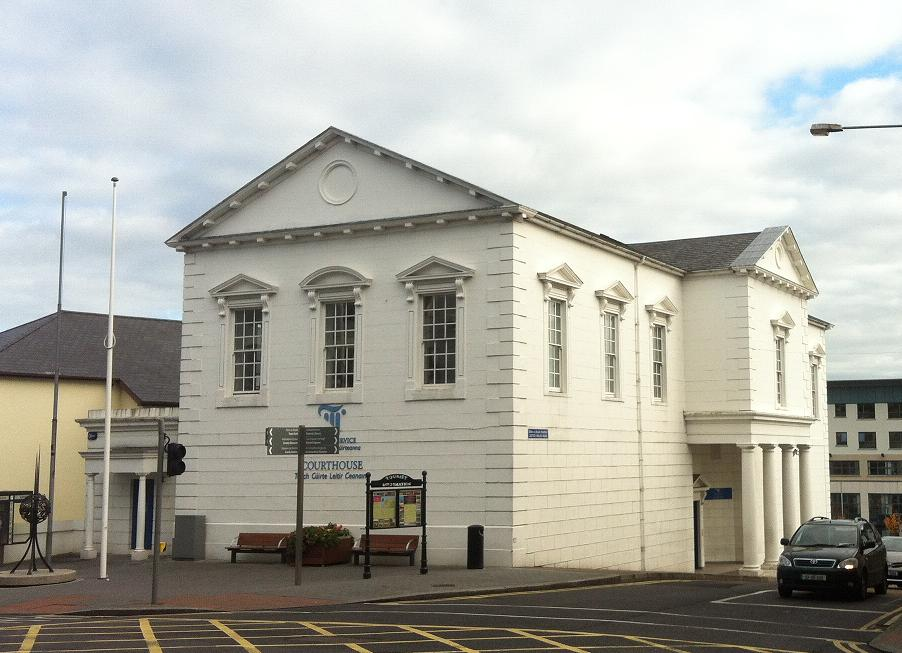
Letterkenny Courthouse

Letterkenny became an urban district in 1899 under the Local Government (Ireland) Act 1898. This became a town council in 2002. In common with all town councils, it was abolished in 2014.

In November 2012, Letterkenny Town Council passed a unanimous vote of no confidence in Phil Hogan, the Minister for the Environment, Community and Local Government, who had proposed the abolition of town councils. In November 2013, they planned to protest Hogan's visit to the town to officially open a new wastewater treatment works at Magherenan but then decided against out of respect for those involved in the project - Mayor Paschal Blake and Deputy Mayor Tom Crossan attended to pass comment against Hogan in their speech.

In 2008, Letterkenny represented Ireland in the Entente Florale, having scooped Gold in the Large Urban Centre category of the 2007 National Tidy Town Awards. Locally there was a minor furore as all flags of competing nations were displayed in prominent areas of the town, with some difficulty encountered when locals discovered the controversial Union Jack flag hanging from a pole adjacent to the library and Paddy Delap's newsagent. The flag is still upsetting to many people angered by continuing British rule in Northern Ireland and as such led to an intensely heated debate on local radio station Highland Radio on the day the judges were in town. The flag was first mounted the previous day (7 August) and had to be taken down when some concerns were raised about its safety on a busy Thursday night. It was remounted the following day. Nevertheless, the town won gold in the competition.

Letterkenny is a local electoral area in County Donegal, and returns five councillors to Donegal County Council. With the 3-seat LEA of Milford, it forms the municipal district of Letterkenny–Milford.

=== National government ===
Until the 2016 general election, Letterkenny was part of the Donegal North-East constituency. In 2016, it became part of the county-wide five-seat Donegal constituency.

=== Policing and crime ===
Crime rates vary widely across different areas of Letterkenny. Recorded crime has been rising in Letterkenny, notably violent crime and fraud, while links with Romanian criminals are also evident.

== Culture ==
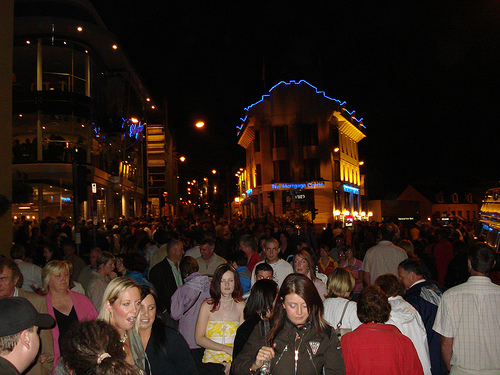
Upper Main Street lit up at night and crowded with people. Crossview House can be seen in the background. Several nightclubs, such as Milan, The Pulse, and the Grill Music Venue, are located near this area.

=== Literature ===
A niece of Jane Austen, daughter of her brother Edward, is buried in the town alongside her husband Lord George Hill. Two other nieces, also daughters of Edward, are buried just outside the town, close to Ballyarr.

=== Leisure and amusement ===
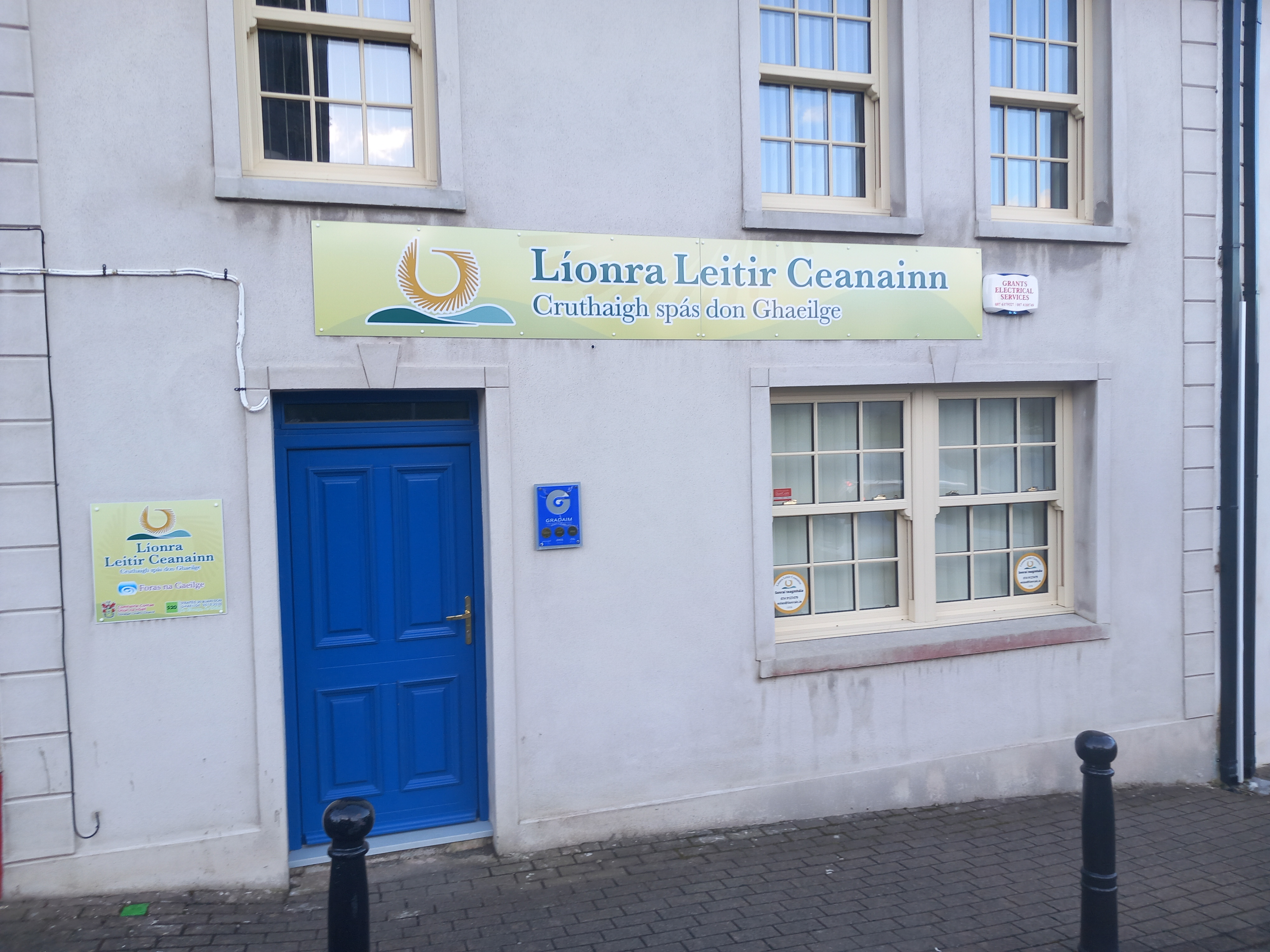
Líonra Leitir Ceanainn building, Castle Street

Annual events of note include the Saint Patrick's Day Parade in March and Earagail Arts Festival in June/July.

An Grianán Theatre, is the largest theatre in County Donegal with a seating capacity of 383, and provides live performances.

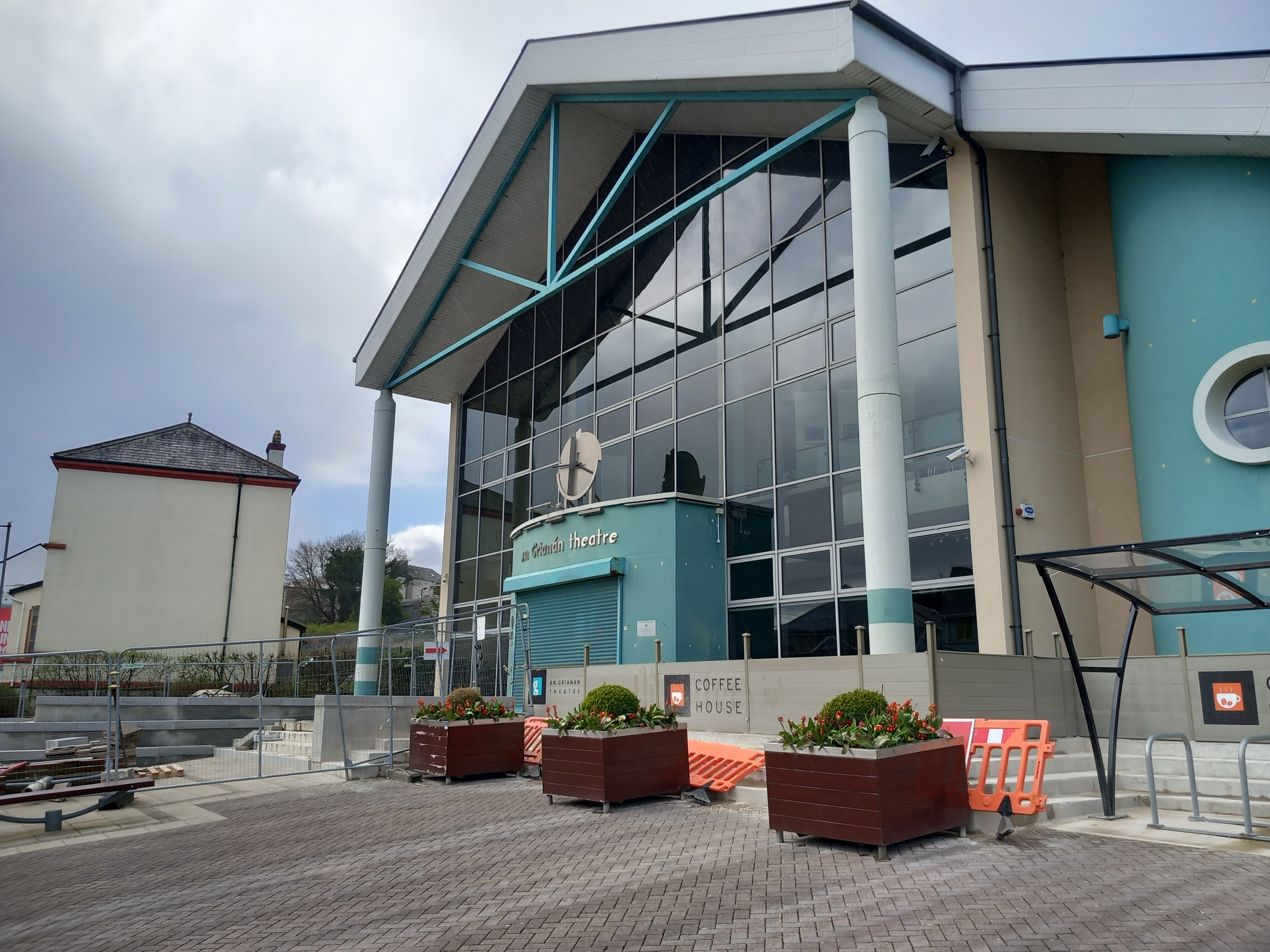
An Grianán Theatre

Letterkenny Regional Cultural Centre, located behind An Grianán Theatre, opened in 2007.

Letterkenny hosted the annual Irish traditional music festival, the Fleadh Cheoil, in 2005 and 2006. Comhaltas Ceoltóirí Éireann organised both festivals. Letterkenny has also hosted the international Pan Celtic Festival in 2006, 2007, 2018 and 2019. Celts from Ireland, Wales, Scotland, Isle of Man, Brittany, and Cornwall visited Letterkenny for the "craic agus ceoil". Along with the daily street performances on Market Square, An Grianán Theatre and The Courtyard Shopping Centre, song, fiddle, harp, and dance contests are also featured.

The Cathedral Quarter hosts events such as the "Street Feast", and the National Culture Night.

The La Scala Cinema was formerly located in Letterkenny. Brendan Behan, while holidaying in County Donegal on Tuesday 22 August 1961, walked there to watch Eamonn Andrews interviewing him in the newsreel Meet the Quare Fella. According to the Derry People, Behan chose a balcony seat and sang along with his onscreen self, "the first duet sung by one person in Letterkenny". Behan had previously visited the town in early June 1960 and attended the Rainbow Bar, where (reported a newspaper) "he regaled those fortunate enough to be present with some typical outspoken comments on affairs of the present".

Letterkenny is a favoured nightlife location for the local catchment area, and also for the rest of Ulster — particularly at weekends and especially for visitors from the nearby city of Derry. The Main Street — originally the retail centre of Letterkenny — has become a centre for nightclubs and pubs, boosted by the remnants of its old shopping district.

Letterkenny is also the namesake of the fictional town of Letterkenny, Ontario, the setting of the Canadian television show also called Letterkenny. There is also a small locality elsewhere in Ontario named Letterkenny, now in the township of Brudenell, Lyndoch and Raglan.

== Sport ==
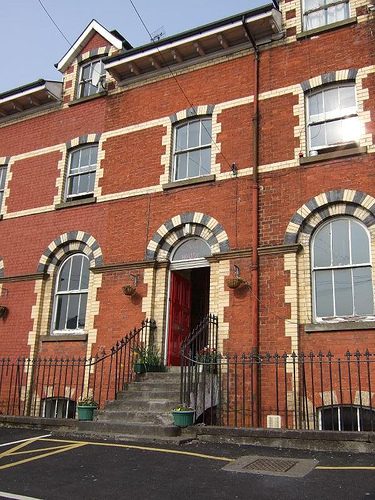
Mount Southwell Terrace

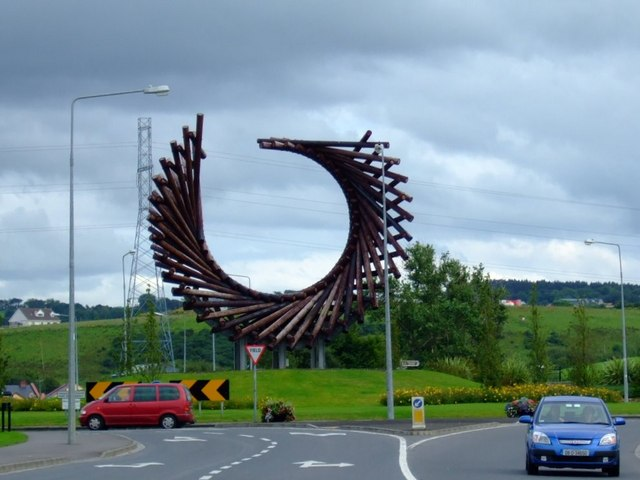
The Polestar sculpture at the Port Bridge is a landmark of Letterkenny

Letterkenny has a modern community purpose-built leisure and sports complex, comprising a swimming pool, football pitches (both natural grass and astroturf), and sports halls. Gaelic football, rugby, and soccer are the most popular sports in the town, but many other minority sports are also practised, such as hurling, boxing, kickboxing, golf, swimming, and gymnastics.

=== Association football ===
Letterkenny Rovers F.C. plays its home games at Leckview Park, at Canal Road, in the town. Bonagee United is another local team and plays its home games at Dry Arch Park, and Glencar Celtic F.C. is another team from the town that plays in the Donegal League. There are also several schoolboy soccer clubs within the town's environs, and an annual league is played at Under 12, Under 14, and Under 16 age groups.

The closest professional football club is League of Ireland Premier Division side Finn Harps in Ballybofey, 12 miles from Letterkenny.

Former Arthurlie F.C. professional football player Denis McLaughlin is from Letterkenny. Former professional footballers Paul Scholes and Rory Delap also have ties to Letterkenny, as does Shane Duffy. Delap and Duffy often visit.

=== Gaelic football ===
Letterkenny has two Gaelic games clubs: St Eunan's and Letterkenny Gaels, who play their home games at O'Donnell Park and at Páirc na nGael in The Glebe, respectively. St Eunan's is one of Donegal's most successful clubs and has won various County and Ulster championships at underage level, as well as 16 titles at senior level as of 2024. The Letterkenny Gaels club was formed in 1996. Letterkenny Gaels provide football, ladies' football, hurling, and Scór activities to the people of the town and surrounding areas. The club has competed in the Donegal Junior Football Championship during the 2020s, and won the 2022 competition. The Letterkenny Gaels club, which shares its facilities with Letterkenny Rugby Club, was promoted to Division 2 of the All-County League in 2021.

=== Rugby union ===
Rugby union is played locally at various levels, from school to senior league level. Letterkenny RFC, which was founded in 1973, is the largest rugby club in the town. It has forged links with several New Zealand rugby fraternities, because Dave Gallaher, the first captain of the All Blacks, was born in Ramelton, a village eight miles (13 km) from Letterkenny. The club's rugby ground in Letterkenny was named the Dave Gallaher Memorial Park in his honour in November 2005 by a visiting contingent of All Black players.

=== Other sports ===
Letterkenny has two men's basketball teams, Letterkenny Heat and Letterkenny IT, as well as a junior basketball club, Letterkenny Blaze. Letterkenny Golf Club is located just outside the town centre. There are also pitch and putt and tennis facilities in the town. Letterkenny Sports Complex, a state-of-the-art leisure centre complete with a skate park, is located on the edge of the town. Letterkenny Athletic Club is also located in the town. The town also hosts the Donegal International Rally on the third weekend of June every year and the Donegal Harvest Rally every October. There is a campaign being run by a local councillor for the construction of a horse racing track and facilities on land at the Big Isle, on the outskirts of the town.

In 2014, the Donegal Marathon was relaunched in the town after a 30-year absence. More than 800 participated in the 2014 race, which was won by Benny Mullan.

Annual events of note include the North West 10K (May), St Eunan's College 5K (May/April), Donegal International Rally (June), Gartan Triathlon (June/July), and Donegal Harvest Rally (October).

== Transport ==
1906 Irish Rail Infrastructure (including Letterkenny station)

=== Air ===
The nearest airport is City of Derry Airport, which is located about 48 kilometres (30 mi) to the east at Eglinton. Donegal Airport (locally known as Carrickfinn Airport) is less than an hour away, located to the west in The Rosses. The closest main international airport to Letterkenny is Belfast International Airport (also known as Aldergrove Airport), located at Aldergrove in County Antrim.

Letterkenny has a small privately operated airfield situated on the outskirts of the town, which is operational; it has both hard and grass runways of 620 metres, hangars available for overnight guests, and an ICAO EILT. There is also a small private airfield at Finn Valley, approximately 8 miles away. It is run and operated by the Finn Valley Flying Club. The airstrip is 700 metres of grass; it is mainly for use by ultralights and light aircraft. The airfield is home to several ultralights, and the flying club runs an open weekend each August. The airfield is only suitable for small private aircraft and ultralights, with no commercial traffic whatsoever. It is approximately 8 miles from the town.

=== Rail ===
The town was, in times past, connected with the once extensive 3ft (914mm) narrow-gauge rail network of County Donegal. The two railway companies that served Letterkenny were the County Donegal Railways Joint Committee and the Londonderry and Lough Swilly Railway. This provided connections to Derry (and through there to Dublin and Belfast), to Lifford and Strabane, to Gweedore and Burtonport, and to Carndonagh, north of Derry. The rail system was built in the late 19th century, with the last extensions opening in the 20th century. Some of these lines were never profitable, built using then UK government subsidies. Only a couple of decades later, the independence of the Irish Free State from the rest of the UK resulted in rail companies operating across two jurisdictions where there had previously been one. This had devastating effects on an already fragile economic situation, resulting eventually in the final closure of all parts of the rail system in the area by December 1959.

Today, the closest railway station to County Donegal is Derry~Londonderry railway station in the nearby City of Derry. This station is owned and run by NI Railways (N.I.R.) and runs via Coleraine to Belfast Lanyon Place railway station and Belfast Grand Central station. In 2017, the strategically important Belfast-Derry railway line was upgraded to facilitate more frequent trains and improvements to the permanent way, such as track and signalling, to enable faster services.

In July 2023, a draft report published by the Department of Transport and Department for Infrastructure recommended a new 160 km/h (99 mph) dual-tracked electrified line between Portadown and Derry, and a new single-track line between Derry and Letterkenny. The draft report also recommended a direct rail service from Letterkenny to Dublin and Belfast. In 2024, Northern Ireland's Translink began a feasibility study into reopening the Derry-Portadown railway line. In January 2025, Donegal County Council approved a motion to fund a feasibility study into a railway line between Letterkenny and Derry, to coincide with Translink's study. The motion also called for a delegation from the council to meet the Minister for Transport to lobby for rail re-opening to be accelerated in the county. In November 2025, Minister of State for Transport Seán Canney said he would engage with the Northern Ireland's Minister for Infrastructure to explore joint funding for a feasibility study into a possible Derry-Letterkenny rail link.

=== Bus ===
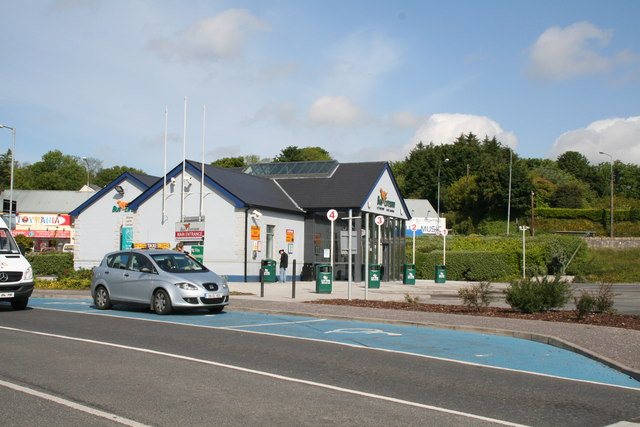
Letterkenny bus station, outside Letterkenny Shopping Centre

Bus Éireann operates multiple daily services from Letterkenny bus station to Ireland's larger urban areas like Dublin (number 32), Derry and Galway (both number 64). Private coach companies operate daily services to and from town. The Lough Swilly Bus Company (known locally as Lough Swilly or the Swilly Bus) operated a local transport service until it ceased trading in April 2014. Bus Éireann is now the main bus service provider in the town.

Letterkenny is also connected to other parts of the county via TFI Local Link. Routes include Route 271 to Burtonport, Route 264 to Ballyshannon, Route 300 to Fanad, Route 953 to Moville and Route 989 to Carrigans.

Private companies provide daily bus services to Derry and Belfast. Letterkenny has no cross-border public transport service linking it directly to Belfast.

=== Road ===
Two national primary roads serve the town: the N13 from the South (Stranorlar) and the N14 from the east (Lifford). The N13 also links into the A2 road (Northern Ireland) to Derry. The N56 secondary road, beginning at the N14 in the town, travels in a loop around the county, ending in Donegal town. Regional roads include the R245, connecting Letterkenny northward to the Fanad and Rosguill peninsulas, and the R250 southwest to Glenties and Churchill.

=== Taxi ===
Taxi services are available from a rank on Main Street at Market Square.

== Environment ==
=== Tidy Towns ===
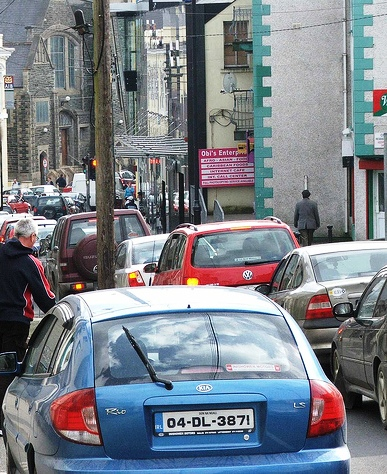
Traffic congestion on Letterkenny's High Road

Letterkenny has a long history in Ireland's national Tidy Towns competition, first entering in 1959 and achieving its best result in 2015.

In 2002, a National Anti-Litter League survey carried out by An Taisce compared Letterkenny's excess litter to that normally associated with The Liberties, a litter blackspot located in Dublin's impoverished inner city. It was voted "Best Kept Urban Centre" in the 2007 'Best Kept Town Awards' and took top prize in the "Large Urban Centre" category at the 2007 Tidy Towns competition. It appeared to maintain its litter-free status for the remainder of that decade, judging by the results of a study by business group Irish Business Against Litter, published on 23 August 2010.

In 2011, it was named its county's tidiest town, receiving 306 points, four less than the overall winner Killarney. This included 47/50 points for its landscaping, the highest number of points scored by any town in this category. Out of the 821 entrants in the 2011 competition, Letterkenny finished in eighth place and received a gold medal for a ninth consecutive year. In the 2012 competition, it was selected as the tidiest town in the north-west of the country. In 2013, it was selected as one of Ireland's top ten towns.

In 2015, Letterkenny achieved its best result in the Tidy Towns competition, being awarded top prize in the "Large Urban Centre" category and receiving the overall award as Ireland's tidiest, Ireland's best. Letterkenny received the same points total in 2016 but this was not sufficient to retain the title.

=== Air quality ===
In December 2019, the Environmental Protection Agency (EPA) cited Letterkenny as having higher levels of air pollution than the Indian capital New Delhi. Professor John Wenger said: "I've been looking at figures from the EPA for the last few years and it's the highest I've seen. It is quite extraordinary". Just over two months later, the Donegal News reported that the latest EPA graphs showed levels were "still off the charts"; more than 200 micrograms per cubic metre of fine particulate matter at times during February 2020, "when the recommended annual mean limit set by the World Health Organisation [sic] for PM2.5 is just 10 micrograms per cubic metre", while levels of sulphur dioxide in Letterkenny surpassed 200 μg/m^{3} "even though levels are not supposed to exceed 125 μg/m^{3} in 24 hours in the interest of the 'protection of human health'".

=== Water quality ===
Water quality in Letterkenny is a persistent problem. Lonely Planet lists Donegal, in which Letterkenny is located, as one of its Irish counties in which visitors should not drink the tap water due to its featuring "toxic chemicals". In March 2020, the Donegal News reported on the concerns of residents in Letterkenny that their water supply was blue in colour and/or reeked of chlorine. The report also stated that these features of the water were less noticeable while running a tap, but much more noticeable when filling a bath.

The European Commission has stated that Ireland has, since 2003, been in breach of a directive against high levels of Trihalomethane (THM) in its water. The Commission stated that large amounts of THM cause diseases of the liver, kidneys and central nervous system, cancers of the bladder and colon, and damages to foetuses during pregnancy. The highest levels of THM were recorded in County Donegal (in which Letterkenny is located), as well as in Counties Cork, Kerry and Wicklow.

== Twins ==
The following places are twinned with Letterkenny:

- Elizabethtown, Pennsylvania, United States
- Rudolstadt, Germany
- Wieluń, Poland

Letterkenny has a "friendship agreement" with West Dunbartonshire Council, the first such agreement in Ireland with a Scottish local authority.

== See also ==
- List of settlements on the island of Ireland by population
- List of populated places in the Republic of Ireland
- List of localities in Northern Ireland by population
- List of venues for All Ireland Fleadh Cheoil na hÉireann (2005, 2006)
- Market Houses in the Republic of Ireland
