= Donegal–Dublin Gaelic football rivalry =

Gaelic football rivalry in Ireland

Donegal–Dublin
- Location: County Donegal; County Dublin
- Teams: Donegal; Dublin
- First meeting: Donegal 0-18 - 0-14 Dublin; 1992 All-Ireland final (20 September 1992)
- Latest meeting: Dublin 2-26 - 2-22 Donegal; 2026 AISFC Round 3 (21 June 2026)

Statistics
- Total meetings: 8
- Most player appearances: 5 Michael Murphy
- Top scorer: 0-19; Michael Murphy
- All-time series: Donegal 2-1-5 Dublin
- Largest victory: Dublin 1-14 - 0-7 Donegal; 2002 All-Ireland quarter-final replay (17 August 2002)

The Donegal–Dublin rivalry is a Gaelic football rivalry between Irish county teams Donegal and Dublin, whose first championship meeting was in 1992. The fixture has been an infrequent one in the history of the championship, and therefore the rivalry is not as intense between the two teams. Donegal's home ground is MacCumhaill Park and Dublin's home ground is Parnell Park; however, all of their championship meetings have been held at neutral venues, usually Croke Park.

While Dublin have the highest number of Leinster titles and Donegal are in sixth position on the roll of honour in Ulster, they have also enjoyed success in the All-Ireland Senior Football Championship, having won 33 championship titles between them to date.

In the final game of the 2013 National Football League, Donegal player Patrick McBrearty sustained a laceration to the shoulder, reported to have been caused by a bite from a Dublin player. The Donegal management team took photographs of the wound, photographs of a wound which appeared to suggest had been caused by the teeth marks of a Dublin opponent. McBrearty was hospitalised after the game to have the wound examined. Accompanied by his parents, he underwent blood tests and was put on a course of antibiotics by concerned medics. The incident overshadowed the entire game and rocked Dublin's football team, according to media there. Commentators described it as "shameful". However, Dublin County Board chairman Andy Kettle reacted with indifference, rejecting the need for an investigation and complaining instead of "a hard pitch". The GAA launched a probe into the behaviour of the Dublin players. On 17 April 2013, the Central Competitions Controls Committee (CCCC) cited Kevin O'Brien, the 2012 All-Ireland Under-21 Football Championship-winning captain, for the biting of McBrearty. However, most sources did not immediately name the player. The offence fell under Category III and a three-match ban was proposed, enough to end the player's year if Dublin were to exit the Championship at an early stage.

During the 2016 National Football League meeting between the teams at Croke Park, Dublin player James McCarthy used his left hand to seemingly gouge the eye of Donegal player Martin McElhinney.

== All time results ==
Dublin win
Donegal win
Draw

No.	Date	Winners	S	Runners-up	Venue	Competition
1.	20 September 1992	Donegal (1)	0-18 - 0-14	Dublin	Croke Park	AISFC final
2.	5 August 2002	Dublin	2-8 - 0-14	Donegal	Croke Park	AISFC quarter final
3.	17 August 2002	Dublin (1)	1-14 - 0-7	Donegal	Croke Park	AISFC quarter final replay
4.	28 August 2011	Dublin (2)	0-8 - 0-6	Donegal	Croke Park	AISFC semi final
5.	31 August 2014	Donegal (2)	3-14 - 0-17	Dublin	Croke Park	AISFC semi final
6.	6 August 2016	Dublin (3)	1-15 - 1-10	Donegal	Croke Park	AISFC quarter final
7.	14 July 2018	Dublin (4)	2-15 - 0-16	Donegal	Croke Park	AISFC quarter final Group Stage
8.	21 June 2026	Dublin (5)	2-26 - 2-22	Donegal	Croke Park	AISFC Round 3
