= Michael Kelly (Gaelic footballer) =

Irish Gaelic footballer

Personal information
- Born: 1960s

Sport
- Sport: Gaelic football
- Position: Goalkeeper
Club
- Years: Club
- 19??–: Four Masters
Inter-county
- Years: County
- 198?–19??: Donegal

Michael Kelly (born 1960s) is a former Gaelic footballer who played as goalkeeper for Four Masters and the Donegal county team.

Kelly played for Donegal in the 1987 Ulster Senior Football Championship but had trouble establishing himself in other seasons due to the presence of Gary Walsh, who would play as goalkeeper for the county's All-Ireland Senior Football Championship-winning team five years later. Thus, 1987's championship was Kelly's only involvement as a player in that competition.

Brian McEniff was searching for a new reserve goalkeeper in 1991 when he noticed Paul Callaghan at a game in Urris. Callaghan served as reserve goalkeeper when Donegal won the Sam Maguire Cup in 1992.
