= 1992 All-Ireland Senior Football Championship final =

- Event: 1992 All-Ireland Senior Football Championship
Donegal	Dublin
0–18	0–14
- Date: 20 September 1992
- Venue: Croke Park, Dublin
- Man of the Match: Manus Boyle
- Referee: Tommy Sugrue (Kerry)
- Attendance: 64,547
- Weather: Dry

The 1992 All-Ireland Senior Football Championship final was the deciding match of the 1992 All-Ireland Senior Football Championship, an inter-county Gaelic football tournament for the top teams in Ireland. The 105th All-Ireland SFC final, the event was held at Croke Park on 20 September 1992 and contested by Dublin and Donegal. Donegal won the match by 0–18 to 0–14, with man of the match Manus Boyle scoring nine points and Dublin's Charlie Redmond missing a penalty.

Dublin entered the game as heavy favourites to take the Sam Maguire Cup over the River Liffey. Instead, Donegal seized it from their grasp and took the cup with them to the north-west. The surprise outcome was hailed as one of the most unbelievable shocks seen in championship football at the time. Wild scenes were reported throughout the country for many months afterwards.

The match is regarded nationally as one of the greatest All-Ireland SFC finals in history. It was the second of what was to be four consecutive All-Ireland SFCs won by Ulster counties in the 1990s, though 1991 winners Down had thrice won the competition during the 1960s.

The broadcast of the game, live on Network Two by RTÉ Sport, featured match commentary provided by Ger Canning and Meath footballer Colm O'Rourke.

== Route to the final ==
As an Ulster-based team, Donegal started their campaign in the Ulster Senior Football Championship. They defeated Cavan in the quarter-final at Breffni Park. They defeated Fermanagh in the semi-final at Healy Park and Derry in the final at St Tiernach's Park. Thus Donegal qualified for the All-Ireland semi-final, in which they defeated Mayo at Croke Park.

As a Leinster-based team, Dublin started their campaign in the Leinster Senior Football Championship. They beat Offaly in a preliminary round match, held at O'Connor Park. They beat Wexford in a quarter-final at O'Moore Park. They beat Louth in the semi-final and Kildare in the final, both games held at Croke Park. Thus Dublin qualified for the All-Ireland semi-final, in which they beat surprise package Clare at Croke Park.

== Match ==
=== Background ===
Dublin were regarded as heavy favourites to win what would have been their 22nd All-Ireland SFC title and their first since 1983. They were appearing at this stage for the first time since 1985. This was the eighteenth occasion on which they had encountered an Ulster team in the championship; they had never been defeated during the previous seventeen. Donegal were regarded as "rank outsiders". They were the 24th team to appear at this stage.

The Donegal team had many players who had won the 1982 and 1987 All-Ireland Under-21 Football Championships: Paul Carr, Matt Gallagher, Martin McHugh, Joyce McMullin, Sylvester Maguire, Anthony Molloy, Charlie Mulgrew and Donal Reid from the former and Manus Boyle, John Cunningham, John Joe Doherty, Barry McGowan and Tommy Ryan from the latter.

The search for tickets was the dominant feature of the match build-up in Donegal. Jim McGuinness, a player on Donegal's panel, later wrote in The Irish Times that the team derived inspiration from boxer Michael Carruth's gold medal fight in the men's welterweight event at the 1992 Summer Olympics, which they all listened to on the radio before a training session one week before the game. Ahead of the game, the Donegal panel spent a night at Shelbourne Park, where matchboxes and lighters were distributed with the words "Dublin All-Ireland winners '92". On the morning of the game, the panel attended Mass in Lucan (said by Bishop of Raphoe Séamus Hegarty, who had opted to forgo a planned trip to Rome that coincided with the day). Brian McEniff was Donegal manager that day; his backroom team included Michael Lafferty, Seamus Bonner and Naul McCole, trainer Anthony Harkin, team doctor Austin O'Kennedy, "man in the stand" Pauric McShea, and "man in Dublin" Sean Ferriter.

Tommy Sugrue from Kerry was named as 1992 All-Ireland SFC final referee.

The minor match took place as the traditional curtain raiser. There was a slight breeze favouring the team playing from right to left, with the sun directed at the eyes of the team defending from the left (which was Armagh in the second half). The minor match went down to the final whistle and concluded with seven minutes of injury time.

Dublin were unchanged from their All-Ireland semi-final. Forward Charlie Redmond was playing in his 25th championship match, while goalkeeper John O'Leary was playing in his 50th championship match.

Donegal were forced to make two late changes to the starting line-up that defeated Mayo in their All-Ireland semi-final. Particularly late was the addition of John Joe Doherty. Martin Shovlin and Tommy Ryan dropped to the bench. Manus Boyle and Doherty, who had not started the semi-final, came in from the start. Boyle had featured as a substitute against Mayo; Doherty had not. Neither Shovlin nor Ryan played in the final. Barry McGowan played at right-corner-back, while Doherty played at left-half-back in the absence of Shovlin.

This was Doherty's 10th championship match. Donegal goalkeeper Gary Walsh was playing in his 20th championship match.

Shortly before throw-in, McEniff was informed that the brother of one of his players, Joyce McMullin, had died from cancer. He chose not to inform McMullin or anyone else on the team until after the match. McEniff later described it as follows: "Everything had gone so smoothly but when I heard that I was knocked for six. Luckily, the lads were outside watching a bit of the minor match. I stamped up and down before deciding that Gerard would have wanted Joyce to play. When the team came back, they could see something was wrong with me, but I managed to hold it together". It later emerged that there had been a miscommunication, and that McMullin's brother had not died. He did so a year later.

Tony Boyle's left knee was heavily strapped, a fact which was much remarked upon before the game; this resulted from an injury he had sustained in the Ulster final. Martin Gavigan and Anthony Molloy also started the game with a leg each strapped.

Finbar Wright sang the national anthem before the game got underway. As Sugrue threw the ball in to commence play, RTÉ co-commentator Colm O'Rourke described it as "absolute perfect conditions for a game... the wind has died and the sun has gone in".

=== First half ===
Donegal played into the Hill 16 end (right to left) in the first half. Molloy chose this in an effort to prevent Dublin from dominating the early part of the game.

The ball fell to Donegal team captain Anthony Molloy from the throw-in; he hit it forward, with Tony Boyle gathering but Boyle being wrestled to the ground by Dublin's Gerry Hargan, who conceded a free to Donegal. Martin McHugh stepped up to take; he sent the ball to the right and wide. Paul Clarke, receiving the ball from Eamon Heery, sent it spinning into the air while attempting to score from distance; Molloy tussled with Vinny Murphy in the effort to retrieve and Sugrue blew his whistle for a free to Dublin. O'Rourke said: "I think Anthony Molloy was very hard done by there. He was pushed out of the way by Vinny Murphy's momentum". Charlie Redmond scored to send Dublin into the lead after two and a half minutes.

Boyle went through the Dublin defence but missed an easy point, to give Donegal their second wide of the game. Mick Galvin then scored Dublin's second point of the game. His teammate Keith Barr collected the ball from Donegal goalkeeper Gary Walsh's kick-out but Barr hopped the ball twice, conceding the free to Donegal with five and a half minutes gone. McHugh took a short free which went straight to Clarke who cleared. Declan Bonner received the ball from Martin Gavigan, only for Jack Sheedy to barge in and push him in the back; Bonner was sent tumbling to the ground and referee Sugrue had words with Sheedy. Bonner delivered the free; Joyce McMullin scrambled amid the Dublin defence James McHugh sent the ball crashing off the crossbar. His brother Martin fired the rebound over the bar to give Donegal their first point of the game after seven a half minutes. O'Rourke commented: "Once the ball comes in high, the Dublin back line are not that great in the air".

Boyle conceded a free after fouling Heery on his way out. Barr sent the ball forward. The ball broke to Dessie Farrell; it went wide. But referee Sugrue blew his whistle and awarded a penalty to Dublin after eight minutes for, as RTÉ television commentator Ger Canning said, "some pushing on Farrell". O'Rourke though, on viewing the replay of Noel Hegarty patting at Farrell before Farrell threw himself sideways through the air, responded: "Ah now, it was a harmless enough penalty". Canning then said: "I have to say, looking at that again, there didn't seem to be any push. That looked a very harsh decision". Charlie Redmond stepped up to take the penalty for Dublin. He sent it skyward, to Walsh's left and wide. Canning described it as "poetic justice" that a foul given for "a fairly innocuous challenge" had come to nothing.

Galvin touched the ball on the ground, conceding the free to Donegal. However, Dublin retrieved possession and Vinny Murphy scored Dublin's third point of the game. Goalkeeper Gary Walsh struck the ball outfield; it reached Manus Boyle but (as Canning called it, "still struggling to make an impact") all he could do was give Donegal their third wide with eleven minutes gone. Dessie Farrell pulled Barry McGowan to the ground, conceding a sloppy free to Donegal. McGowan sent the free to Donal Reid, who gave it to Molloy just to his right; Molloy kicked it to Manus Boyle who passed to James McHugh and McHugh sent the ball over the bar for Donegal's second point. Canning mentioned that "Dublin are prone to lose concentration from time to time", as Redmond "in full flight" sent another ball skywards and wide. Redmond, again in an advanced position, lost the ball to Noel Hegarty. Redmond then showed his indiscipline by injuring Hegarty "in the face" (Canning) "with a heavy tackle" (O'Rourke). It was Donegal's ninth free kick, with a quarter of an hour gone. However, Dublin regained possession and Sheedy scored Dublin's fourth point of the game. O'Rourke noticed that Vinny Murphy had fouled in hand-passing the ball to Sheedy, so the point should not have stood. Around midway through the first half, Martin McHugh was pushed in the back; from the resulting free (which McHugh quickly took), Brian Murray sent the ball wide with his left foot. But Dublin goalkeeper John O'Leary kicked the ball straight to Brian Murray, who sent James McHugh through; Dublin's D. Foran fouled McHugh. Declan Bonner sent over the resulting free, leaving the score at Dublin 0–4 Donegal 0–3. Dublin attacked again but Gavigan booted the ball up the field, Bonner collected and passed to Molloy, who sent it flying onwards to an unmarked Tony Boyle (O'Rourke: "Gerry Hargan has lost Tony Boyle completely"); Boyle passed it across the Dublin goal to Manus Boyle, who struck the crossbar with the goal gaping, though the ball went over for a point, levelling the match. Canning reminded viewers: "Dublin, as we said earlier, are inclined to lose concentration from time to time and that was one instance". Sheedy, with his second point of the game, instantly restored Dublin's one-point lead, despite the best efforts of Martin McHugh.

"It was a very good Donegal side, they proved their worth. They came in under the radar, but they weren't pot lucky. They were an experienced side with the likes of the two McHughs [brothers James and Martin], Bonner, Gallagher, Molloy, and Murray. Donegal were very experienced, they were a battle hardened team".

— Keith Barr speaking about the game in 2020

O'Rourke commented: "A lot of high quality football in this game so far". Then Vinny Murphy handed the ball to Donegal's Matt Gallagher, who passed along the sideline to Bonner, who passed to Molloy, who ran inside and released Martin McHugh, who ran through the Dublin defence, saw off four Dublin players, sent the ball over the bar for his second point of the game and brought his team level again. Canning said: "The game is now turning out to be all we had hoped it might be". Almost instantly, while the replay of Martin McHugh was still being shown to television viewers, Donegal attacked again; Bonner shot high from distance and over the bar for his second point, giving Donegal the lead for the first time in the match. Donegal regained possession from O'Leary's kick-out but Murray sent the ball wide again, the fifth Donegal wide of the game and Murray's second. O'Leary kicked the ball outfield once more but Donegal won possession and a free in the middle of the pitch. Martin McHugh sent the ball towards Manus Boyle; Sheedy hauled Boyle to the ground. Boyle sent the ball over the bar for his second point of the game, giving Donegal a two-point lead (0–7 to 0–5). Again from O'Leary's kick-out, Dublin lost possession (by conceding a sideline free), allowing Manus Boyle's persistence to make a point for Tony Boyle, giving Donegal a three-point lead with ten minutes to go until half-time. O'Rourke commented: "Donegal are playing the game at a fantastic pace. They're getting everything back into play very quickly, frees and sidelines". Farrell received a long ball from Heery and hit it directly over the bar, reducing Donegal's lead to two again. Keith Barr's name was taken by the referee after a head-high shoulder challenge on Molloy. Martin McHugh kicked Donegal's eleventh wide, as his scapular broke through his jersey and flapped loosely in the breeze (erroneously referred to by O'Rourke as "his Miraculous Medal"). "Dublin having to battle now, being made to fight by a very tenacious Donegal side", said Canning. Vinny Murphy was forced by Matt Gallagher to attempt a point from distance; Walsh simply caught the ball. "The pace", said Canning in commentary, "is absolutely amazing so far for amateur players". "Absolutely breathtaking game at the moment", agreed O'Rourke. Three and a half minutes away from half-time, Manus Boyle collected a free delivered by Brian Murray, turned to his right and sent it over the bar for his third point and, in doing so, restoring Donegal's three-point lead. Redmond sent a free over the bar to reduce the deficit to two once more with about a minute to go until half-time. But it fell to Martin McHugh to score the final point of the half, receiving the ball from brother James after Gary Walsh's kick-out and leaving the score at the interval at Donegal 0–10 to Dublin 0–7. Donegal, and Anthony Molloy, were in possession when Sugrue blew the half-time whistle.

=== Second half ===
Dublin introduced Paul Bealin as a half-time substitute. With play recommencing, Keith Barr sent the ball forward from a free towards Vinny Murphy who knocked it wide. Mick Galvin scored the opening point of the second half and his second of the match, reducing Donegal's lead to two once again. Dublin's Paul Curran fouled Joyce McMullin. Manus Boyle sent the resulting free over the bar, restoring Donegal's three-point lead. Barr sent the ball towards Murphy from a free again but Gary Walsh gained possession prompting Farrell and Murphy to gang up on and foul the Donegal goalkeeper. James McHugh went on a mazy run through the Dublin defence in a move that also involved Bonner receiving and then returning to McMullan; McHugh sent the ball wide. Farrell advanced along the sideline and attempted a point for Dublin; Walsh, however, plucked the dropping ball as it flew towards the crossbar. Murphy had the next attempt for Dublin; this went wide.

From Walsh's kick-out the Dublin substitute Bealin struck the ball but it went to the left and wide. This time from Walsh's kick-out the ball broke to Donegal's McMullan, who sent Brian Murray through; Murray, with Paul Clarke tugging on him, passed to Manus Boyle but Dublin fouled Boyle. Murray's run had left him hobbling as the camera moved off him and focused on referee Sugrue and Manus Boyle, until Boyle alerted Sugrue to what was going on behind him. Murray was then seen lying on his back in some discomfort with his left (unstrapped) leg in the air, as the Donegal medical team arrived to tend to him. Barry Cunningham was then seen on the sideline warming up. Meanwhile, as Murray lay stricken upon the ground, a Dublin player (Paul Curran) took the opportunity to move the ball to a more advantageous position; cheers from the Donegal supporters alerted Sugrue to this indiscretion and he restored the ball to its appropriate position. Murray got to his feet then fell again, holding his left (unstrapped) calf muscle. He got to his feet a second time and proceeded to limp off the pitch. Cunningham entered the field of play in Murray's place. Manus Boyle sent the free over the bar, his fifth point, to give a Donegal a four-point lead for the first time in the match (Donegal 0–12 to Dublin 0–8). From O'Leary's kick-out the ball fell to Donegal's Martin Gavigan; Gavigan passed to Martin McHugh, who sent Cunningham through only for Paul Curran to take him down as he approached the Dublin goal. Manus Boyle sent the free over to score his sixth point and open up a five-point lead for Donegal (0–13 to 0–8).

Vinny Murphy fouled Cunningham close to the Donegal goal. Walsh resorted to donning a white cap with the logo of a German clothing manufacturer on it, as the sun began to affect his vision. Martin McHugh blocked an attempted pass by Keith Barr. The ball fell to Curran, who ran forward, but Noel Hegarty intercepted Curran's attempted pass and raced clear. Dublin's Niall Guiden scored the next point, reducing the deficit to four points and ensuring that all six of his team's forwards would score in the game. Receiving the ball from Declan Bonner, Manus Boyle sent it off target for his team's second wide of the half. A high challenge by Dessie Farrell on Donegal captain Anthony Molloy was penalised. From this, Dublin gave away another free nearer their goal; Declan Bonner stepped up to send the ball over the bar, his third point of the game and his second from a free, leaving the score at Donegal 0–14 Dublin 0–9 midway through the second half. As Noel Hegarty charged through and sent a pass outside to Manus Boyle, Canning remarked that Dublin were "very disappointing so far... the Dubs simply haven't been able to perform because of the tenacity of this Donegal challenge"; Mick Deegan knocked the ball out and conceded a '45 to Donegal. Martin McHugh sent the ball in but nothing came of it for Donegal. Dublin broke away down the field but Sheedy ultimately fired wide. Bealin sent Walsh's kick-out in the general direction of Charlie Redmond but Redmond conceded possession back to Donegal. Dublin's next attack broke down when Donegal forward Manus Boyle blocked down defender Deegan's pass deep in Donegal territory in front of Hill 16; Gavigan gathered the ball, only for Sheedy to pull him by his jersey to the ground and concede a foul. Bealin launched the ball in once more; Vinny Murphy charged through but Matt Gallagher blocked his effort, with Murphy retrieving the ball and passing to Redmond in a frantic passage of play, Redmond ultimately losing the ball and his temper and flattening Barry McGowan. Still incensed, Redmond grabbed the ball from Barr as he approached to take a 50-metre free; Redmond's delivery dropped straight into Cunningham's hands. Redmond, through again, lost the ball to a challenge from Walsh; Vinny Murphy collected and, as two Donegal defenders leaped towards him, struck Dublin's seventh wide from close range.

"Dublin struggling very, very badly at the moment... Donegal will probably win this match if they can avoid giving away a goal at this stage", said O'Rourke. An object was lobbed from Hill 16 in the direction of Donegal goalkeeper Walsh. A pile-up in the midfield led Sugrue to award the free to Donegal with twelve minutes remaining; Gavigan kicked it towards Tony Boyle, who lost possession in a challenge from Paul Clarke, but Manus Boyle retrieved the ball, saw off the attention of Mick Deegan and scored his seventh point of the game (Donegal 0–15 to Dublin 0–9). Canning hailed the point as follows: "Is that the kind of point that will now ensure Donegal's first All-Ireland final success? Is the cup on its way up to the north-west for the very first time?" Clarke reduced the deficit by sending a '45 between the Donegal posts with just under ten minutes of the game remaining. Murphy scored the next point with just over eight minutes left after Sheedy passed to Tommy Carr, the Dublin captain, in an advanced position. Then Heery reduced Dublin's deficit to three. Mick Deegan fouled Tony Boyle after Cunningham sent him through. Manus Boyle dispatched the free to score his eighth point of the game (his fifth from a free) and leave the score at 0–16 to 0–12. As play continued, cheers from the Donegal supporters were audible; the Dublin supporters were silenced. Redmond tapped a free between the posts from close range inside the last five minutes to reduce the deficit again to three points. Gary Walsh launched the ball upfield, Cunningham collected and kicked left-footed forward towards Manus Boyle; Boyle left a Dublin player flat on his backside and tapped the all over the bar. Gary Walsh then denied Vinnie Murphy's attempted strike on goal, turning the ball around the post. Paul Clarke scored the resulting '45 for what would prove to be Dublin's last point of the game with two minutes remaining, leaving the score at 0–17 to 0–14. From Walsh's kick-out, Cunningham fetched the ball in the middle of the field, only to be knocked of balance by Paul Curran; Manus Boyle retrieved possession and sent Martin McHugh on a run up the sideline pursued by Keith Barr; the ball found Declan Bonner whose shot went askew and O'Leary made the catch, though Tony Boyle tumbled into him and knocked him over the end-line for a foul. O'Leary, however, sent the ball directly to McMullan, who passed to James McHugh, who passed to Bonner, who ran to his right, turned onto his left and sent the ball left-footed through the flailing arms of two Dublin defenders and between the posts, then clenched his fists in celebration. Dublin, four points down and needing a goal, won a free when Donal Reid tripped N. Guy Din; however, a quick pass to Sheedy and the Dublin forward had sent the ball wide from close range. Walsh's kick-out went to Cunningham, who passed to Bonner, who fell after being interfered with by a Dublin player as Sugrue was seen with his whistle to his lips. Martin McHugh wrestled with Sugrue in a bid for primacy over the match ball.

=== Details ===
20 September 1992

Donegal	0–18 – 0–14	Dublin
M Boyle 0–9, D Bonner 0–4, M McHugh 0–3, J McHugh 0–1, T Boyle 0–1		C Redmond 0–3, P Clarke 0–2, M Galvin 0–2, V Murphy 0–2, J Sheedy 0–2, E Heery 0–1, N Guiden 0–1, D Farrell 0–1

Croke Park, Dublin
Attendance: 64,547
Referee: Tommy Sugrue (Kerry)

Donegal	Dublin

GK	1	Gary Walsh
CB	2	Barry McGowan
FB	3	Matt Gallagher
CB	4	Noel Hegarty
WB	5	Donal Reid
HB	6	Martin Gavigan
WB	24	John Joe Doherty
MF	8	Anthony Molloy (c)
MF	9	Brian Murray	(substituted off) 44'
WF	10	James McHugh
HF	11	Martin McHugh
FW	12	Joyce McMullin
CF	13	Declan Bonner
FF	14	Tony Boyle
CF	15	Manus Boyle
Substitutes:
MF	20	Barry Cunningham	(substituted on) 44'
Manager:
Brian McEniff

GK	1	John O'Leary
CB	2	Mick Deegan
FB	3	Gerry Hargan
CB	4	Tommy Carr (c)
WB	5	Paul Carr
HB	6	Keith Barr
WB	7	Eamon Heery
MF	8	Paul Clarke
MF	9	Dave Foran
WF	10	Charlie Redmond
HF	11	Jack Sheedy
WF	12	Niall Guiden
CF	13	Dessie Farrell
FF	14	Vinny Murphy
CF	15	Mick Galvin
Substitutes:
MF	19	Paul Bealin	Substituted on
Manager:
Paddy Cullen

Man of the Match:
Manus Boyle

== Post-match ==
Fans flooded the pitch — among them future Irish international soccer goalkeeper Shay Given and future Donegal players such as Paul Durcan.

RTÉ co-commentator Colm O'Rourke said: "Donegal were much the better team... to win it so convincingly, because they probably were an even better team than the scoreline suggested".

Donegal captain Anthony Molloy climbed the steps of the Hogan Stand to various congratulatory gestures from nearby supporters: handshakes, back claps and pats on the head of hair that he still had. After shaking the hand of the President of Ireland, he shook the hand of President of the Gaelic Athletic Association Peter Quinn, from Donegal's neighbouring county of Fermanagh. The Taoiseach then emerged from behind Quinn to shake Molloy's hand, and briefly spoke with the Donegal captain. Then a woman, a man in clerical garb and the spouse of the President of Ireland all offered Molloy their hands.

Quinn addressed his audience for just under a minute in the Irish language. He presented Molloy with the Sam Maguire Cup and the Donegal captain raised the trophy aloft. Molloy then set the cup down, rubbed his face and exchanged words with Quinn before moving towards the microphone. He spoke — also in the Irish language — to cheers from the crowd, which had by this time thronged the pitch. He then provided an English language translation, yelling: "We have done it!" The camera zoomed out to reveal Daniel O'Donnell, not far from Molloy and behind the President of Ireland, with his hand aloft and frantically waving with an enormous smile upon his face; a lady behind him bearing a Donegal flag leaned over and spoke to him and he kissed her. Molloy commenced his speech of thanks, first mentioning Michael Lafferty, Naul McCole, Seamus Bonner and Anthony Harkin, then singling out the team's trainer Anthony Harkin for "a special word of thanks". He then thanked the medical team, including physios and doctor. He thanked his wife, his family, the families of the other players, former players and supporters. He then singled out Martin Shovlin for special mention. Then he referred to team manager McEniff as "the greatest man in Ulster at the moment", drawing wild cheers from the audience. He offered commiserations to the losing Dublin team. He concluded with the exclamation "Sam is for the hills!". He walked off, wiped the left of his face and — pointed by an official towards the trophy — raised the Sam Maguire aloft again. His speech is still held in high regard within the sport nationally.

As the players took turns to raise the Sam Maguire Cup, O'Rourke noted: "I see the Taoiseach keeping a very close eye on the Donegal team, obviously looking for prospective candidates for Donegal in the next election". 27 years later, Molloy stood for the Fianna Fáil political party in the Glenties Electoral Area at the 2019 Donegal County Council election and won a seat. Albert Reynolds was no longer Taoiseach though, or leader of Fianna Fáil; indeed, he had died nearly five years previously.

Donegal's victory banquet was at a hotel in Malahide.

The winning team boarded the train westwards, trundling through the midlands towards the wilderness of Sligo, intent on embarking from there by coach bound for Donegal Town. However, crowds gathered at train-stops in Kildare, Meath, Westmeath, Longford, Leitrim and Sligo to gawk in awe at the team that had put Dublin to the sword. 9,000 people were waiting in Sligo alone. It was many hours behind schedule when the team arrived in their home county.

== Legacy ==
This was the first time since 1971 that a team won their maiden All-Ireland Senior Football Championship. However, this surpassed even that, as Offaly — also unfancied — had appeared in the 1961 and 1969 All-Ireland Senior Football Championship finals.

Donegal's triumph over the citizens inspired many other counties with little success at that time, including Derry, Armagh and Tyrone, to believe they could achieve the All-Ireland — these three counties achieved their dream in the next eleven years. Donegal's march to the title was still regarded nationally as an "almost mystical expedition" years later, until the arrival of Jim McGuinness, who surpassed this achievement.

Donegal returned to the All-Ireland Senior Football Championship final after a 20-year absence on 23 September 2012, beating Mayo, and reached the final again in 2014, only to lose to Kerry.

Dublin laboured towards another final in 1994, only to lose again on the big day—this time to Down.

The sides have met in the All-Ireland Senior Football Championship since then. The first meeting was 10 years later in 2002, with Dublin requiring a replay to beat Donegal in the quarter-final. They met again in the 2011 semi-final, where Dublin narrowly beat Donegal in a controversial game. Donegal then defeated reigning All-Ireland champions Dublin in the 2014 semi-final, in one of the biggest shocks the sport had ever witnessed.

In 2018, Martin Breheny listed 1992 as the seventh greatest All-Ireland Senior Football Championship final, placing it ahead of 1978, 1966 and the 1988 replay in his top ten finals, and behind only 1998 in that decade.

TG4 aired the match during the COVID-19 pandemic in June 2020, when all live sport in the country was shut down.
