= Paul Callaghan (Gaelic footballer) =

Irish Gaelic and association footballer

Personal information
- Born: 2 August 1971 (age 55) Burt, Ireland
- Occupations: Telecom Éireann employee (1992); Full-time Ulster GAA coach
- Height: 6 ft 2 in (188 cm)

Sport
- Sport: Gaelic football
- Position: Goalkeeper
Inter-county
- Years: County
- 1991–1998: Donegal
Inter-county titles
- All-Irelands: 1
Association football career
- Position: Goalkeeper
Youth career
- Grianan Celtic
Senior career*
Years	Team	Apps	(Gls)
	Finn Harps		(0)
	Derry City		(0)
	Ballymena United		(0)
-1998	Omagh Town		(0)
- * Club domestic league appearances and goals

Paul Callaghan (born 2 August 1971) is an Irish Gaelic football coach and former goalkeeper for the Donegal county team. First called into the senior county team in 1991, he was reserve goalkeeper when the team won the Sam Maguire Cup the following year by defeating Dublin in the final.

Callaghan's appearances for his county were limited by the form of Gary Walsh and he did not make his championship debut until after Walsh's retirement in 1996. Callaghan then injured himself during a game two years later and lost his position in the team to Tony Blake.

== Biography ==
Callaghan is a native of Burt. He was the youngest of three sons (following Martin and Dessie) born to Seamus and Delia Callaghan on 2 August 1971. His childhood hero was Packie Bonner.

His club, also named Burt, amalgamated with several other Inishowen clubs (Buncrana, Cardonagh, Malin, Naomh Mura and Urris) to compete in the Donegal Senior Football Championship. Due to the weakness of the sport in this area, Callaghan would not have been expected to make it as a county player.

Callaghan was the county under-21 goalkeeper when he was first called into the senior panel at the age of 19 in 1991. Tyrone knocked the team out of the Ulster Under-21 Football Championship at the semi-final stage, by one point and two points, on their way to winning two All-Ireland Under-21 Football Championships.

Callaghan played for an Inishowen team against a Donegal team to mark the opening of new facilities at Urris in 1991 when county senior manager Brian McEniff noticed him. He made his senior county debut against Monaghan, starting the game in the 1992 Dr McKenna Cup. He served as the understudy of Gary Walsh during Donegal's successful 1992 All-Ireland Senior Football Championship team. One of the youngest members of that panel (along with Mark Crossan and Jim McGuinness, with Noel Hegarty and Tony Boyle being slightly older than the three), Callaghan was the only panel member from the large northern neglected Inishowen peninsula. He brought the Sam Maguire Cup home to a crowded community hall in Burt on the Friday night after the final. He started his second game for his county against Kerry in a challenge match held in London in 1992.

Following the retirement of Walsh the previous year, Callaghan made his championship debut against Antrim in 1997. His championship career was restricted to three appearances; Tony Blake replaced him when Callaghan sustained a groin injury in his final championship match, a 1–11 to 0–11 win against Antrim in 1998. Despite being kept on the bench by Walsh for so many years, as of 2012, Callaghan and Walsh were close and had kept in contact with each other.

Callaghan also played association football for Grianan Celtic and advanced as far as the All-Ireland Senior Schools Soccer final with Scoil Mhuire in Buncrana when he was 17 years of age. Leeds United and Bradford City, which were professional association football clubs in England, expressed interest and invited him for trials but he did not attend them after receiving advice to become a goalkeeper in Ireland's soccer leagues. He maintained his involvement with association football as a means of improving his Gaelic football standards. He became first choice goalkeeper for Finn Harps and reserve goalkeeper for Derry City. He also played for Ballymena United and Omagh Town, first choice at the latter club around the time of the 1998 Omagh bombing, which led to him playing in prominent fundraising fixtures against English top-level professional clubs Chelsea, Liverpool and Manchester United in the year after.

After retiring, Callaghan became a full-time coach, co-ordinating Gaelic games for the disabled across the province of Ulster. In 2015, he won the GAA Disability Coach of the Year Award. He has also been goalkeeping coach under county managers Brians McEniff and McIver in the 2000s, training such players as Paul Durcan. He has coached underage teams at his club and served as club secretary.

He is married to Karen (née McSheffrey), a Carndonagh native, with whom he has two children.

Sporting positions
Preceded by Gary Walsh	Donegal Number One Goalkeeper; 1997–1998	Succeeded by Tony Blake
