= James McHugh (Gaelic footballer) =

Irish Gaelic footballer (1964–2026)

Personal information
- Native name: Séamus Mac Aodha (Irish)
- Born: 1964 Letterkenny, County Donegal, Ireland
- Died: 10 August 2026 (aged 62) Drummallaght, County Cavan, Ireland
- Occupation: ESB network technician

Sport
- Sport: Gaelic football
- Position: Half-forward
Club
- Years: Club
- Cill Chartha
Club titles
- Donegal titles: 3
- Ulster titles: 0
- All-Ireland Titles: 0
College
- Years: College
- Regional Technical College, Tralee
Inter-county
Years	County	Apps (scores)
1990–1996	Donegal	59
Inter-county titles
- Ulster titles: 2
- All-Irelands: 1
- All Stars: 1

James McHugh (1964 – 10 August 2026) was an Irish Gaelic footballer who played as a forward for Cill Chartha and the Donegal county team.

With Donegal he won two Ulster Senior Football Championship titles, an All-Ireland Senior Football Championship title and an All Star. As a player with his club he won three Donegal Senior Football Championship titles, the first as captain, and four Comórtas Peile na Gaeltachta titles, the third as captain. He also won a Railway Cup with Ulster.

== Early life and family ==
James McHugh was born in Letterkenny, Ireland, in 1964, to Jim and Kathleen McHugh, into what would later be described as Donegal football's "first family". His brother Martin was, with James, another member of the 1992 All-Ireland SFC-winning team. Martin and James also had two sisters and another brother.

James's son, Eoin, and Martin's sons, Mark and Ryan, would later play for Donegal. Married to Noreen, the McHughs had a daughter as well as Eoin.

== Playing career ==
McHugh made his inter-county SFC debut against Cavan in 1990. He played against Armagh in the 1990 Ulster SFC final, won by Donegal, and received the Man of the Match award afterwards.

He won a second Ulster SFC title in 1992, before starting in the half-forward line in the 1992 All-Ireland SFC final, when he scored one point from play as Donegal defeated Dublin by a scoreline of 0–18 to 0–14. He won an All Star at the end of 1992.

McHugh continued to play senior inter-county football for Donegal until 1996. He represented Regional Technical College, Tralee, in the sport, and also played inter-provincial football for Ulster. He won the 1994 Railway Cup with Ulster.

With his club Cill Chartha, McHugh won three Donegal SFC titles: in 1985, 1989, and 1993, with the first of them as captain. He lost three other finals, in 1982, 1987 and 1988. He also won four Comórtas Peile na Gaeltachta titles with his club, including as captain in 1990. When Eoin McHugh then captained their club to the 2024 title, father and son completed a unique feat.

== Post-playing career ==
McHugh went on to manage his club. As of 2009, he was working for the ESB, and continued to work as a network technician with the company for the rest of his life. He appeared on the TV programme Up for the Match, live from his locality, alongside presenter Marty Morrissey and actor Matthew Broderick, ahead of the 2025 All-Ireland SFC final.

== Death ==
While driving on the N3 in the townland of Drummallaght, near Ballyjamesduff, in County Cavan, in the early afternoon of 10 August 2026, McHugh, aged 62, sustained fatal injuries in a collision with a van. The car's other passenger was McHugh's wife, Noreen, who was airlifted to Beaumont Hospital, Dublin, where she died the following evening. The van driver's injuries were minor.

When it learnt of his death, McHugh's club immediately suspended activities. He was the first member of the 1992 All-Ireland SFC-winning panel to die. Thus, McHugh was Donegal's first All-Ireland SFC-winning player to have died, though Seamus Bonner who was a selector in 1992, died in 2012. McHugh's son, Eoin, was still playing for Donegal at the time of his parents' deaths, as was his nephew, Ryan.

== Honours ==
Inter-county

- All-Ireland Senior Football Championship (1): 1992
- Ulster Senior Football Championship (2): 1990, 1992

Inter-provincial

- Railway Cup (1): 1994

Club

- Comórtas Peile na Gaeltachta (4): 1987, 1989, 1990 (c), 1991
- Donegal Senior Football Championship (3): 1985 (c), 1989, 1993

Individual

- All Star (1): 1992
- Ulster SFC final man of the match: 1990
