= Matt Gallagher (Gaelic footballer) =

Irish Gaelic footballer (born c.1960)

Personal information
- Born: 1960s
- Height: 5 ft 10 in (178 cm)

Sport
- Sport: Gaelic football
- Position: Utility player
Clubs
- Years: Club
- ?–? ?–?: Aodh Ruadh; Naomh Bríd
Inter-county
- Years: County
- 1981–1995: Donegal
Inter-county titles
- Ulster titles: 2 or 3
- All-Irelands: 1

Matt Gallagher (born 1960s) is an Irish former Gaelic footballer who played for Aodh Ruadh and, later, Naomh Bríd, as well as the Donegal county team. For many years he was Donegal's most capped player until Brian Roper broke his record.

In April 1980, his secondary school De La Salle College Ballyshannon, defeated Leinster champions St Mary's CBS, Portlaoise, by 2–10 to 1–6 to win the All-Ireland Colleges B title at Croke Park, with Gallagher playing in the final.

Gallagher won the 1982 All-Ireland Under-21 Football Championship with Donegal, with his brother Pauric also on the team. Pauric was killed in a car crash in the U.S. in 1989.

Matt Gallagher played for Donegal from 1981 until 1995. He suffered from appendicitis in 1983, causing him to miss Donegal's victory over Cavan in the Ulster final and the All-Ireland semi-final. He fell out with manager Tom Conaghan during the 1980s. He missed the 1989 Ulster SFC final. Brian McEniff restored him to the team in time for the 1990 Ulster SFC, and Gallagher played against Armagh in the 1990 Ulster final, won by Donegal. He was a key member of the county's 1992 All-Ireland Senior Football Championship winning team. A utility player often deployed as a defender, Gallagher started at full-back in the 1992 All-Ireland Senior Football Championship Final in which Donegal defeated Dublin by a scoreline of 0-18 to 0-14. Later that year he won an All Star for his performances in that campaign. He was assigned the job of marking Vinnie Murphy in that All-Ireland final.

He played his club football for Aodh Ruadh and Naomh Bríd.

After retiring from inter-county football in 1997, he joined then-manager Declan Bonner's backroom team. He briefly served under McEniff in 2003 and has also managed Naomh Bríd.

== Honours ==
- All-Ireland Senior Football Championship: 1992
- Ulster Senior Football Championship: 1990, 1992
- All-Ireland Under-21 Football Championship: 1982
- Ulster Under-21 Football Championship: 1982?
- Silver Jubilee Football Team of the Ulster GAA Writers Association (UGAAWA) nomination: 2012

== See also ==
- List of All Stars Awards winners (football)
