= Tommy Sugrue =

Gaelic football referee

Personal information
- Home town: Tralee
- Years active: 1977–?
- Employer: GAA

Sport
- Sport: Gaelic football
- Position: Referee

Tommy Sugrue is a Gaelic football referee from County Kerry. He is from, and lives in, Tralee. Sugrue refereed four finals of the All-Ireland SFC during the 1980s and 1990s: 1988 (both the drawn game and replay), 1992 and 1994.

== Career ==
He began refereeing in 1977, got given the 1983 Kerry County Final. Then off it all went for him. He got Cork v Dublin in the 1983 National League semi-final then he gotput onto to the inter-county referees' panel. He did more than 13 years of inter-county. He refereed National Football League semi-finals and finals (he refereed the 1990 National Football League final wearing socks), he refereed four All Ireland SFC semi-finals, an All-Ireland Under-21 Football Championship and Club Final, he refereed in the Munster and Ulster Senior Football Championships. He refereed the four All-Ireland SFC finals: 1988's Cork v Meath (drawn game and replay); 1992's Donegal v Dublin; 1994's Down v Dublin.

Sugrue refereed four finals of the All-Ireland Senior Football Championship. First came the 1988 All-Ireland Senior Football Championship Final, contested by Meath and Cork, the game when they got a Kerryman to referee a Cork game. This ended in a draw so there was a replay, which Sugrue also refereed and which Meath won by a point. Sugrue then refereed the 1992 All-Ireland Senior Football Championship Final between Donegal and Dublin. He gave a penalty to Dublin a penalty early in the game. The Dubs thought they had the game won easy. Charlie Redmond, faced with Gary Walsh, stepped up to take the kick. Redmond missed. Dublin never recovered and Donegal easily outscored them to claim their first All-Ireland title. Then the 1994 All-Ireland Senior Football Championship Final between Down and (again) Dublin. Dublin couldn't win that one either. Of the four All-Ireland SFC finals that Sugrue refereed it was the 1992 final that he was most pleased with, because Donegal won it.

In 2018, Martin Breheny listed the 1988 replay and 1992 as the tenth and seventh greatest All-Ireland SFC final respectively.

Sugrue spoke to The Irish Times before the 1996 All-Ireland Senior Football Championship Final replay about his own experience from the 1988 replay, which was the last time this had happened. He said: "It's the last thing a referee needs, going through it all again, the sleepless nights, not being able to eat, getting sick. Everyone knows the sacrifices players make for these big occasions. It's the same for referees. I've a local semi-final coming up and I'm training four nights a week. It's the last thing you want, having to psyche yourself to go through the physical torment and the things that get said, even phone calls to your house. It has a terrible effect on your family. I know it's the same for players but they could be on a holiday in the Canaries in a few months. A referee gets nothing. I don't envy Pat McEnaney going through it all again."
