= Donal Monaghan =

Irish Gaelic footballer

Personal information
- Native name: Dónall Ó Muineacháin (Irish)
- Born: 1950 (age 75–76) County Donegal, Ireland
- Occupation: Businessman

Sport
- Sport: Gaelic football
- Position: Right corner-back
Club
- Years: Club
- 1965–1984: Four Masters
Club titles
- Donegal titles: 1
Inter-county
- Years: County
- 1968–1978: Donegal
Inter-county titles
- Ulster titles: 2
- All-Irelands: 0
- NFL: 0
- All Stars: 1

Donal Monaghan (1950 – 3 January 2016) was an Irish Gaelic footballer who played as a right corner-back for the Donegal county team.

Born in County Donegal, Monaghan first played competitive Gaelic football at the age of fifteen when he first linked up with the Donegal minor team, before later lining out with the under-21 side. He made his senior debut in the 1968-69 National Football League. Monaghan went on to play a key part for Donegal in a team that made a provincial breakthrough, and won two Ulster medals and one All Stars Award. His uncle, Johnny Monaghan, played Gaelic football with Fermanagh in the 1930s.

Monaghan represented the Ulster inter-provincial team on a number of occasions and was a Railway Cup runner-up in 1975. At club level he won one championship medal with Four Masters.

Monaghan retired from inter-county football after the 1978 championship, while a knee ligament injury brought his club football career to an end in 1984.

He assisted Tom Conaghan with the team that won the 1982 All-Ireland Under-21 Football Championship.

Donegal's second All Star winner, his son Barry also played for Donegal, 117 games in total at senior level.
