= Four Masters GAA =

Donegal-based Gaelic games club

Four Masters
- Na Ceithre Máistir
- Founded: 1932
- County: Donegal
- Colours: Blue and White
- Grounds: Pairc Tir Conaill
- Coordinates: 54°39′17.21″N 8°07′19.08″W

Playing kits
Standard colours

Senior Club Championships
	All Ireland	Ulster champions	Donegal champions
Football:	-	-	3

Four Masters is a GAA club located in the town of Donegal in County Donegal, Ireland. They are one of the strongholds of Gaelic football in Donegal.

== History ==
Based in the parishes of Townawilly and Killymard, Donegal Town, Four Masters is one of the oldest and most successful clubs in Donegal having won 3 Donegal Senior Football Championships.

The GAA club under Warwickshire County Board in Coventry, England, is named after the Four Masters club in Donegal. That club was unable to register as a Donegal Club but reserved the Four Masters name.

Austin O'Kennedy, a top GAA doctor who oversaw all Donegal county teams for 22 years, has also been involved with Four Masters for even longer. Tom Conaghan who managed the Four Masters to two county championships in 1982 and 1984 went on to manage the county team during the late 80s. He managed Donegal to the 1989 Ulster Final which they lost in a replay to Tyrone.

The club has more All Stars Awards than any other club in the county, Donal Monaghan winning one in 1974 (the year he was Man of the Match against Down in the Ulster Senior Football Championship final), Joyce McMullin winning one in 1990, Paul Durcan winning two in 2012 and 2014 and Karl Lacey winning four in 2006 and 2009 at corner back and 2011 and 2012 at centre-half back. Lacey also won the GAA GPA Player of the year award in 2012.

After the 2012 All-Ireland Senior Football Championship final, Four Masters organised the homecoming for the victorious Donegal county team.

== Notable players ==
- Seamus Bonner — Ulster SFC winner: 1972, 1974, 1983
- Shane Carr — All-Ireland SFC semi-finalist: 2003
- Tom Conaghan — the 1982 All-Ireland Under-21 Football Championship-winning manager played for the club
- Barry Dunnion
- Paul Durcan — All Star: 2012, 2014
- Luke Keaney
- Michael Kelly
- Karl Lacey — All Star: 2006, 2009, 2011, 2012 + 2012 All Stars Footballer of the Year
- Joyce McMullin — All Star: 1990
- Barry Monaghan — All-Ireland SFC semi-finalist: 2003
- Donal Monaghan — All Star: 1974

== Managers ==
Years	Manager
1932–2020	—N/a
c. 2020–2021	Pat Campbell
c. 2022–	Kevin Sinclair

== Honours ==
- Donegal Junior Hurling Championship: 1955, 2024
- Donegal Senior Football Championship: 1982, 1984, 2003
- Donegal Senior Football League Division 1: 1948, 1949, 2010
- Donegal Senior Reserve Football Championship: 2000, 2001, 2010
- Donegal Senior Football League Division 1 Reserves: 2000, 2001, 2009, 2011, 2014
- Donegal Senior Football League Division 3 Reserves: 2021
- Donegal Senior Football League Division 2: 1981, 1989, 1996
- Donegal Intermediate Football Championship: 1996
- Donegal Intermediate Reserve Football Championship: 1995, 1996
- Donegal Football League Shield: 1987, 1993
- Donegal Junior Football Championship: 1943, 1965, 1975
- Donegal Under-21 Football Championship: 1979, 2001
- Donegal Under-21B Football Championship: 1995
- Donegal Minor Football Championship: 1996, 2001, 2002, 2007, 2022, 2023, 2024
- Donegal Minor B Football Championship: 2014
- Ulster Minor Club Championship: 2023, 2024
