= Luke Gavigan =

Gaelic footballer

Luke Gavigan is a Gaelic footballer who played with Donegal. He won an All-Ireland Under-21 Title in 1987 and was a member of the squad that won the 1992 All-Ireland Senior Title. His brother Martin also played for Donegal. Luke's son (and Martin's nephew) captained the Donegal U20s to the 2020 Ulster Final.
