= W. D. Flackes =

- Born: William David Flackes; 14 March 1921; Burt, County Donegal, Ulster, Ireland
- Died: 1 August 1993 (aged 72); Belfast, Northern Ireland
- Occupations: Journalist, broadcaster, author
- Known for: Political corresponent, BBC (1964–1982)

William David Flackes, OBE (14 March 1921 – 1 August 1993), better known as W. D. Flackes or Billy Flackes, was an Ulster journalist, broadcaster and author. He was the BBC Northern Ireland Political Correspondent between 1964 and 1982.

Eric Waugh in The Independent, referring to Flackes' reporting of The Troubles, said "When it began to come to the boil - in 1966 - Flackes at once displayed before the network audience a notable talent for the simple exposition, balanced yet necessarily brief, of what was a highly complex community problem."

== Early life ==
Flackes was born in 1921 in Burt, where he was raised, a village and district in the south of Inishowen in the north of County Donegal in the north-west of Ulster, the northern province in Ireland. Before his career in journalism, Billy Flackes worked in the timber business in Belfast and as a telephone installer in Derry.

== Career ==
=== Print journalism ===
When he was 18, Billy Flackes ran a South Antrim weekly newspaper. During the Second World War he held staff jobs on various local newspapers in Northern Ireland. He worked for a number of local newspapers in the west of Ulster, including The Fermanagh News and The Derry Standard, before he joined the staff of The Ulster News Letter.

Between 1947 and 1957, he was a parliamentary reporter for the Press Association.

He joined The Belfast Telegraph in 1957, eventually becoming chief leader writer and news editor. He later wrote political commentary for Ulster Television (UTV) in Belfast.

=== Television ===
In the autumn of 1964, Billy Flackes became a political correspondent for the BBC in Belfast. Within a couple of years he would be reporting on the violent conflict involving Northern Ireland's republican and loyalist paramilitaries in what was later to become widely known as The Troubles, the primarily sectarian conflict in Northern Ireland with its historic roots in the constitutional status of Northern Ireland.

His East Donegal speaking style, characterised by the "staccato articulation" and clipped vowels common in Ulster, informed the audience as the Northern Irish crisis evolved over the next 16 years. Following his retirement from BBC Northern Ireland in 1982, he was nominated to the board of the Irish national broadcaster, RTÉ, in Dublin, serving until 1991.

== Personal life ==
Flackes married Mary Dougan in 1950 and they had one daughter. He was appointed as an OBE in 1981.

Following his death, he was buried in Lisburn in the south of County Antrim.

== Writing ==
He wrote biographies of The 1st Viscount Brookeborough, the former Unionist Prime Minister of Northern Ireland, and Field Marshal The 1st Viscount Montgomery of Alamein, whose family also came from Inishowen. In 1980, he wrote Northern Ireland: A Political Directory.
