= Johnny McLoone =

Donegal Gaelic footballer

Personal information
- Born: 1970s

Sport
- Sport: Gaelic football
Club
- Years: Club
- ?–20??: Naomh Conaill
Club titles
- Donegal titles: 3
Inter-county
- Years: County
- 2003–: Donegal

Johnny McLoone is an Irish former Gaelic footballer who played for Naomh Conaill and the Donegal county team.

== Playing career ==
McLoone won a Donegal Senior Football Championship title in 2005, the first in his club's history. He later won two more Donegal SFC titles. McLoone scored 0–2 against St Eunan's in the 2005 Donegal SFC final replay, while he was held scoreless in the 2010 final against Na Cealla Beaga, having started both games; he made a substitute appearance against St Eunan's in the 2015 Donegal SFC final, during which he scored 0–1. He also played in the 2010 Ulster Senior Club Football Championship, when his club reached the final of the competition.

While playing for Donegal, McLoone won the 1996 Ulster Minor League and 1996 Ulster Minor Football Championship, when he was part of a team that included Michael Hegarty and Barry Monaghan, and that was managed by Anthony Molloy. He played in the 1996 All-Ireland Minor Football Championship semi-final defeat to Laois, his kick short at the end meaning Donegal lost the game by a point. Brian McEniff called McLoone into the senior team after he was appointed as manager again in 2003. McLoone continued to play for Donegal under McEniff's successor Brian McIver, during which time he won a National Football League medal in 2007.

Since retiring, McLoone has managed his club's under-21 team. He is a father and takes care of his family's shop, which is in Killybegs.

== Honours ==
Donegal

- National Football League: 2007
- Ulster Minor Football Championship: 1996
- Ulster Minor Football League: 1996

Naomh Conaill

- Donegal Senior Football Championship: 2005, 2010 2015
