= Barry Monaghan =

Irish Gaelic footballer

Personal information
- Native name: Barra Ó Manacháin (Irish)
- Born: County Donegal, Ireland
- Occupation: ?

Sport
- Sport: Gaelic football
- Position: Full back
Club
- Years: Club
- ?–: Four Masters
Club titles
- Donegal titles: 1
Inter-county
Years	County	Apps (scores)
2000–2010	Donegal	117

Barry Monaghan is an Irish Gaelic footballer who plays for Four Masters and also, formerly, the Donegal county team.

== Club ==
Monaghan won the Donegal Senior Football Championship with his club in 2003. He scored two points in the final against Termon.

== Inter-county ==
Monaghan won the All-Ireland Vocational Schools Championship in 1995.

Alongside Johnny McLoone, Michael Hegarty and Eamon Reddin, he played in a minor team that nearly qualified for the 1996 All-Ireland Minor Football Championship final.

Monaghan made his senior Donegal debut in October 2000 in what was Mickey Moran's first game in charge, a league victory at home to Offaly, in which he scored a point.

He made his championship debut in 2001.

He played in the 2003 All-Ireland Senior Football Championship semi-final against Armagh.

He played in the 2006 Ulster Senior Football Championship final at Croke Park. He was a member of the Donegal team that won the National Football League in 2007, playing from the start to the end in the final against Mayo.

In 2010, he announced he would take a break. He returned the following month.

A serious leg injury ended his career.

He also captained his county.

He made 117 senior appearances for Donegal.

He is the son of Donal Monaghan, the Donegal All Star winner.

== Honours ==
Donegal

- National Football League Division 1: 2007
- All-Ireland Vocational Schools Championship: 1995

Club

- Donegal Senior Football Championship: 2003
