= Brian Murray (Gaelic footballer) =

Irish Gaelic footballer

Personal information
- Native name: Brían Ó Muirí (Irish)
- Nickname: Bringus
- Born: 1963/4
- Occupation: Garda
- Height: 6 ft 3 in (191 cm)

Sport
- Sport: Gaelic football
- Position: Midfield
Clubs
- Years: Club
- 19??–19?? 19??–19?? 1996–?: Aodh Ruadh; Civil Service; Kilcock
Inter-county
- Years: County
- 19??–199?: Donegal
Inter-county titles
- Ulster titles: 2
- All-Irelands: 1
- All Stars: 0

Brian Murray (born 1963/4) is an Irish former Gaelic footballer who played for clubs in Donegal, Dublin and Kildare, as well as for the Donegal county team.

He is from Ballyshannon. In April 1980, he scored a goal at Croke Park as his secondary school De La Salle College Ballyshannon, defeated Leinster champions St Mary's CBS, Portlaoise, by 2–10 to 1–6 to win the All-Ireland Colleges B title.

In November 1988, Pat Spillane passed the ball to Murray; Murray promptly scored a goal to defeat The Kingdom in their own county.

Murray played against Armagh and scored a point in the 1990 Ulster final, won by Donegal.

He was a member of Donegal's 1992 All-Ireland Senior Football Championship winning team. He played in midfield and started in midfield in the 1992 All-Ireland Final as Donegal defeated Dublin by a scoreline of 0–18 to 0–14. He played his club football for Aodh Ruadh and the Civil Service (Dublin), whom he was a member of when he played Dublin in the All-Ireland Final of 1992. Murray worked as a Detective Garda based at Kilmainham Garda Station in Dublin. He was the only member of the 1992 panel living outside Donegal.

He joined the Kilcock club in 1996.

He was still appearing as a substitute during Declan Bonner's first spell as county manager.

As of 2021, he was a Detective Garda based in County Kildare.
