= Martin McDermott =

Roscommon Gaelic footballer

Martin "Marty" McDermott is a former Gaelic footballer who played for the St Brigid's GAA club and at senior level for the Roscommon county team. He has also managed Gaelic team. He is a bank manager by profession.

== Playing career ==
McDermott played for Roscommon in the late 1970s, typically as a midfielder. He was inspired by Mick O'Dwyer and Heffo and won a National League medal in 1979.However, a knee injury forced him out of the final match, where Roscommon defeated Cork. McDermott also played in the Roscommon team that lost to Kerry in the 1980 all Ireland final.

== Managerial career ==
After his playing career ended, McDermott became manager of the Roscommon team. It was said that: "In Gaelic games he is a relatively new phenomenon, the 'team manager' - usually young, tracksuited, able to perform a wide range of skills, thick-skinned, a good motivator, a good communicator, a multi-talented father figure - roles which Martin 'Marty' McDermott has become very familiar with over the past few years."

McDermott got the team to the 1982 All-Ireland Under-21 Football Championship Final which was won by Donegal. In 1983 he took his local club St Brigid's to a Roscommon Senior Football Championship final, but lost out to Clan na nGael. He was then given the senior Roscommon job.

In the late 1980s the senior Roscommon team were emergent and they got reached six provincial finals day between 1987 and 1993. McDermott got over the senior team in 1988. They were promoted to Division 1 in 1989 and stayed there for the next few years. They reached two league semi-finals . McDermott won two Connacht Senior Football Championship (SFC) titles as manager in 1990 and 1991.

The Mayo team that defeated them in 1989 was burned by a favourite stag earned from the 1989 All-Ireland Senior Football Championship Final but the primrose and blues took them to a replay and took them to extra-time before the loss came.

The following year Roscommon won the 1990 Connacht final. This was a 0-16 to 1-11 victory over Galway at Dr Hyde Park. The same year they also got to Croke Park for the first time in nearly a decade; they lost out to Cork in this match.

The team reached the 1991 Connacht SFC final. Derek Duggan scored a farmers free into the teeth of a strong wind over Mayo over in Castlebar to tie the game up. The team posted a 0-13 to 1-9 score in the replay, again in Dr Hyde Park. In the same year, the team were within a solitaire point off Meath in the 1991 All-Ireland Senior Football Championship semi-final.

== Personal life ==
McDermott is a native of Oran, and after managing Roscommon to two Connacht SFC titles in 1990 and 1991, he relocated to South Dublin in 1997, moving to Blackrock-Stillorgan. He became involved with Kilmacud Crokes with his son. McDermott said in 2022: "From '97 until last year, I was involved on the committees, coaching, management teams". He was also Director of Football "for seven or eight years".
