= De La Salle College Ballyshannon =

Location
- County Donegal; Ireland

Information
- School type: Secondary School

De La Salle College Ballyshannon is a secondary school in County Donegal, Ireland.

Its catchment area extends into County Leitrim.

== History ==
It won the All-Ireland Colleges Title in 1980 with only 155 pupils at the time, beating St Mary's CBS of Portlaoise at Croke Park. It won the McLarnon Cup in 1999.

== Notable alumni ==
- Matt Gallagher: Footballer
- Pauric McShea: Footballer
- Brian Murray: Footballer
- Brian Roper: Footballer
- Gary Walsh: Footballer
