= Tony Blake (Gaelic footballer) =

Irish Gaelic footballer

Personal information
- Born: 1971 (age 54–55)

Sport
- Sport: Gaelic football
- Position: Goalkeeper
Club
- Years: Club
- 19??–200?: St Eunan's
Inter-county
- Years: County
- 1991–2004: Donegal

Tony Blake (born 1971/2) is an Irish Gaelic football coach and former player for St Eunan's and the Donegal county team.

He attended St Eunan's College, where he played for the school team.

Donegal manager Brian McEniff called Blake onto his panel in 1991, though Blake soon departed for a career in association football. He was reserve goalkeeper for Sligo Rovers when they won a treble in the League of Ireland.

Blake made his championship debut for Donegal after Paul Callaghan sustained a groin injury during Donegal's championship win over Antrim in 1998.

He started Mickey Moran's first game in charge of Donegal, a league win at home to Offaly in October 2000.

Blake won a Railway Cup in 2000.

He never won the Ulster Senior Football Championship during his career. He played throughout the 2002 Ulster Senior Football Championship as Donegal advanced to the final. He also featured in the All-Ireland Senior Football Championship quarter-final against Dublin. It was his best campaign and he credits the assistance of former Donegal goalkeeper Gary Walsh for his part in this.

He started the first game of Brian McEniff's last spell as Donegal manager, a league defeat to Galway in Tuam in February 2003.

He played in the 2003 All-Ireland Senior Football Championship semi-final against Armagh.

A persistent knee injury forced him to retire from inter-county football in May 2004. Donegal's manager at the time, McEniff (again), said of Blake's meeting with a surgeon: "when the test results came back it showed a lot of wear and tear behind the knee cap". Blake had worn a bandage on his knee before Donegal's 2004 Dr McKenna Cup final defeat to Tyrone. McEniff said: "I noticed it that day and it became apparent that he had a problem". Paul Durcan (who had just won a Sigerson Cup with Institute of Technology, Sligo) had been deputising for Blake in the 2004 National Football League.

Since retiring, Blake has been a goalkeeping coach with Letterkenny Rovers and Naomh Colmcille.

== Honours ==
- Railway Cup: 2000
- Ulster Senior Football Championship runner-up: 2002

Sporting positions
Preceded by Paul Callaghan	Donegal Number One Goalkeeper; 1998–2004	Succeeded by Paul Durcan
