= Michael Hegarty =

Donegal Gaelic footballer

Sport
- Sport: Gaelic football
Clubs
- Years: Club
- 19??–200? 20??–: Cill Chartha; Naomh Ultan
Club titles
- Donegal titles: 1
Inter-county
- Years: County
- 19??–2011: Donegal
Inter-county titles
- Ulster titles: 1
- NFL: 1

Michael Hegarty is an Irish former Gaelic footballer who played for Cill Chartha and the Donegal county team.

Alongside Johnny McLoone, Barry Monaghan and Eamon Reddin, he played in a minor team that nearly qualified for the 1996 All-Ireland Minor Football Championship final.

He made 50 championship appearances, a team record when set in 2011 and not exceeded until Colm McFadden made his 51st championship appearance against Derry in the Ulster quarter-final on 25 May 2014. He broke the record at 46 in the Ulster SFC quarter-final against Cavan where, though named to start, he appeared as an early substitute for Martin McElhinney.

He started Mickey Moran's first game in charge of Donegal, a league win at home to Offaly in October 2000.

He started the first game of Brian McEniff's last spell as Donegal manager, a league defeat to Galway in Tuam in February 2003.

He played in the 2003 All-Ireland Senior Football Championship semi-final against Armagh.

In 2007, Hegarty was part of the Donegal team that won the county's first National Football League title. They defeated Mayo in the final, with Hegarty playing the full game.

Hegarty was not part of the 2010 county panel but newly appointed Donegal manager Jim McGuinness called him into the 2011 Dr McKenna Cup panel. He played in the 2011 Ulster Senior Football Championship final against Derry, scoring 0–2 as Donegal won the competition for the first time in 19 years. He retired at the end of the season, with 127 senior appearances for Donegal.

He won the 2017 Donegal Senior Football Championship, scoring a point in the final. It was the first time his club had won the title in 24 years, having been defeated by Glenswilly at the same stage the previous year. He played in the SFC for the hundredth time for his club in October 2021.

Having transferred to Naomh Ultan, Hegarty returned to his native club as manager in 2024. He was manager for the 2024 Donegal Senior Football Championship, shortly after leading his club to the Comórtas Peile na Gaeltachta Senior Championship title.
