= Burt Distillery =

Irish whiskey producer

- Location: Burt
- Coordinates: 55°00′50.3″N 7°28′44.0″W
- Founded: 1814
- Founder: William Leathem
- Status: Defunct
- Capacity: ~54,000 gallons per annum (1828)

Burt Distillery was an Irish whiskey distillery which operated in Burt, County Donegal, Ireland between 1814 and 1841.

Though of little importance in the context of the Irish whiskey industry, the distillery is remarkable for having existing for over a quarter of a century in an area notorious for the production of poitín, an illicit spirit.

== History ==
In 1814, William Leathem established a small distillery at Bohillion, just outside Burt, County Donegal. The distillery, though not large, was notable for being the only licensed distillery to have operated with any degree of success in Donegal, an area renowned for the production of Poitín, an illicit spirit. To differentiate his product from the Poitín produced by the illicit stills, Leathem produced a high quality whiskey from grain, which was aged for a least a year. This contrasted with the local Poitín, which although of good quality, was generally produced from a mix of barley and molasses and sold within a few weeks of being distilled. In addition, Leathem developed an export trade with England.

The precise history of the distillery is difficult to piece together. However, records show that in 1821, the distillery was operating a 49 gallon still, and that output in 1828, reached 53,873 gallons of proof spirit.

In 1834, Leathem gave important first-hand testimony before a Government inquiry on illicit distilling practices. In his testimony, Leathem was very critical of the excise administration, in particular, on their practice of posting incompetent English officers to Ireland.

Although Burt Distillery had initially succeeded in competing against its illicit rivals, by the 1830s, it also faced competition from two large scale legal distilleries which had emerged in nearby Derry. As a small scale operation without economies of scale, it appears that Burt Distillery could not compete on both fronts, and the distillery closed in 1841.

It is not known what happened to the distilling equipment. However, the distillery buildings themselves were retained in use well into the 20th Century. One of the distillery buildings, is still extant, and is currently used as a farmyard building. With a prominent chimney, it can be seen by passing motorists on the N13 from Derry to Letterkenny, a silent reminder of Burt’s distilling heritage.
