= Burt, County Donegal =

Burt An Bheart
- Parish
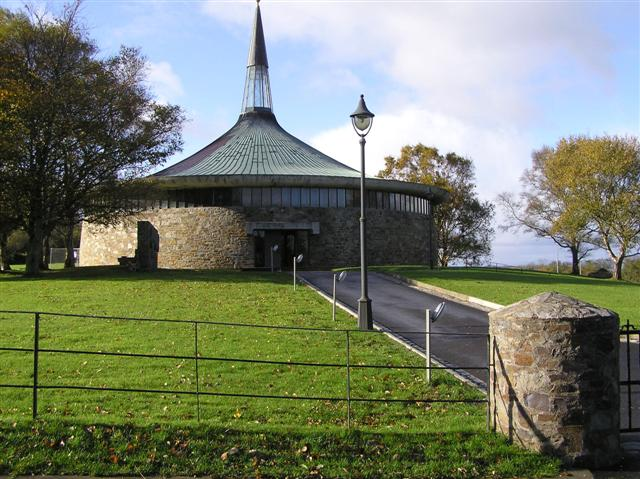
- Burt Chapel

- Location in Ireland
- Coordinates: 55°02′06″N 7°26′41″W
- Country: Ireland
- Province: Ulster
- County: County Donegal

Government
  - Dáil Éireann: Donegal
- Time zone: UTC+0 (WET)
  - Summer (DST): UTC+1 (IST (WEST))

Burt (Irish: An Bheart) is a parish in County Donegal, Ireland, on the main road between Letterkenny and Derry.

== Location ==
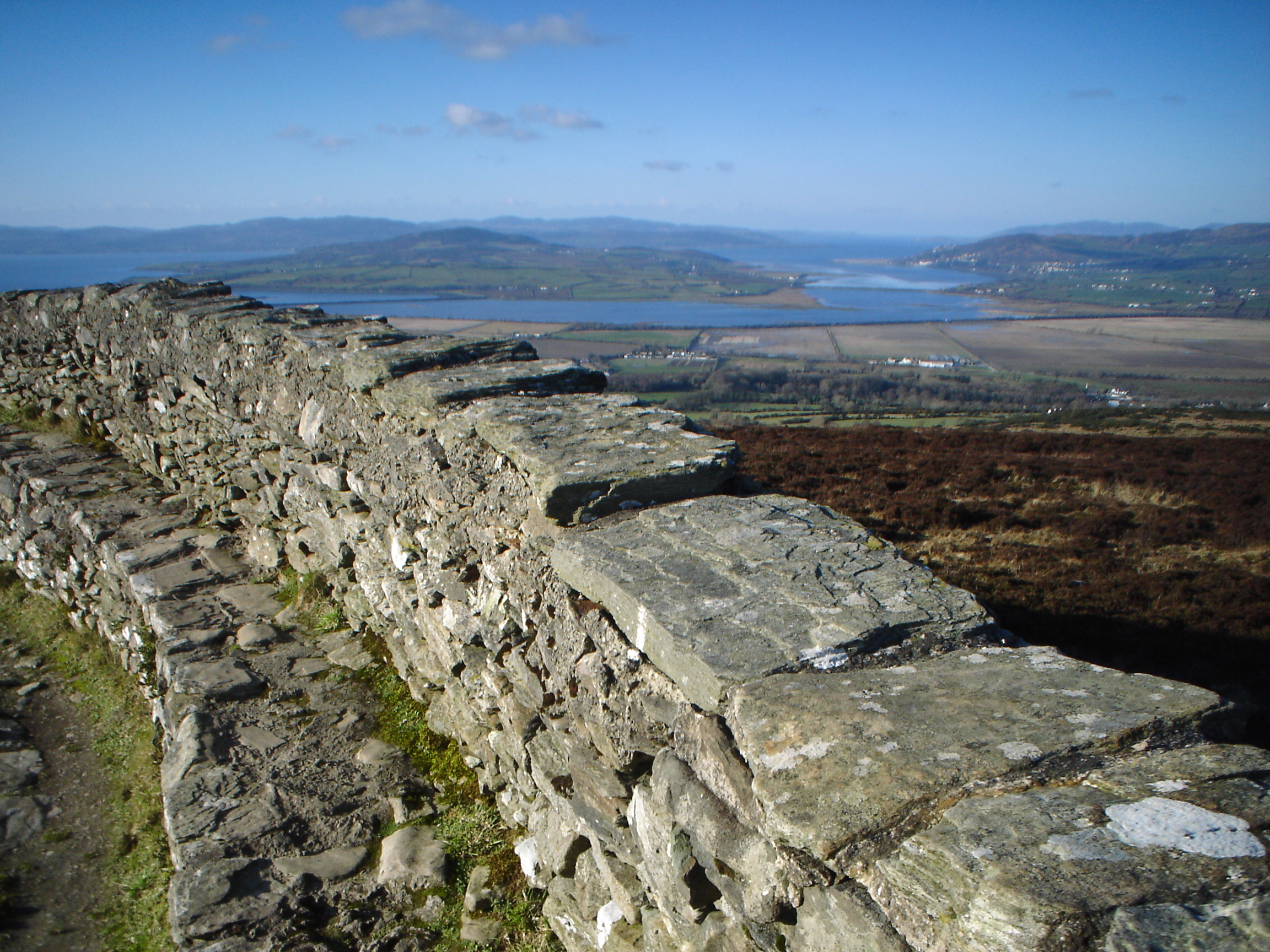
A view of Burt from Grianán of Aileach

At the base of the Inishowen Peninsula in County Donegal, Burt is part the parish of Fahan.

It is represented in Dáil Éireann, the lower house of the national parliament of Ireland, under the constituency of Donegal. It is represented in Donegal County Council under the Local Electoral Area of Buncrana.

There are 23 townlands that make up Burt.

== History ==
Burt Castle (Irish: Caisleán Bhirt) stands on top of Castlehill and dates from 16th century; it has strong connections with the O'Doherty clan.

The ancient Grianán of Aileach stone fort is located atop Greenan Mountain in Burt. The ringfort dates to c. 1700BC. On a clear day, it is possible to see the hills of seven counties of Ireland and the Ulster coastline, particularly Lough Swilly, Inch Island and Lough Foyle.

From Grianán Mountain you can see the extent of the reclaimed land at Inch Level which was enclosed by three embankments in 1856.

Burt Roman Catholic Chapel along the N13 road was modelled after the Grianán of Aileach by architect Liam McCormick. Construction began in 1964 and the chapel was opened in 1967. The Presbyterian congregation nearby dates from 1673, but the present church was built in 1896.

Travellers along the main N13 road from Derry to Letterkenny also see the remains of the Burt Distillery with its stone chimney, in use during the 18th and 19th centuries at Bohullion Lower.

Behind Castlehill, on the edge of Lough Swilly, are the remains of an abbey or church at Grange. The churchyard at Grange contains some of the earliest grave stones in this area dating from 17th Century. On the walls of the old building are gravestones and tablets showing the graves of Rev. Andrew Ferguson Sen the second Presbyterian minister of Burt 1690 to 1725 and also his son Rev. Andrew Ferguson Jun who succeeded his father as Minister of Burt from 1725 to 1787.

Burt GAA club was founded in the year 1887 during the period of the Gaelic revival. The club has won many titles at both County and Provincial level in the years since.

== Notable people ==
- Paul Callaghan (born 1971), Gaelic footballer
- Mark Coyle (born 1997), professional footballer
- W. D. Flackes (1921–1993), BBC political correspondent
- Joseph McLaughlin (1867–1926), U.S. Republican Congressman from Pennsylvania
- Josias Leslie Porter (1823–1889), Presbyterian missionary; President of Queen's College, Belfast

== Townlands ==
- Ballyederowen
- Ballymoney
- Blanket Nook
- Bohullion Lower
- Bohullion Upper
- Bunnamayne
- Burt Level
- Carrowen
- Carrownamaddy
- Carrowreagh
- Castlecooly
- Drumhaggart
- Dundrean
- Elaghbeg
- Gortcormacan
- Grange
- Inch Level
- Lisfannan
- Moness
- Mulleny
- Skeeoge
- Speenoge
- Toulett
