= Donal Reid =

Irish Gaelic footballer

Personal information
- Born: 1961 or 1962 (age 64–65) Letterkenny, Ireland
- Occupation: Physiotherapist
- Height: 5 ft 11 in (180 cm)

Sport
- Sport: Gaelic football
- Position: Utility player
Clubs
- Years: Club
- c. 1982–19?? c. 1992–?: Bundoran; Red Hughs
Inter-county
Years	County	Apps (scores)
1982–1992/3	Donegal	100+
Inter-county titles
- Ulster titles: 3
- All-Irelands: 1

Donal Reid (/ˈdoʊnəl ˈriːd/ DOH-nəl reed; born 1961 or 1962) is an Irish former Gaelic footballer who played for Bundoran, Red Hughs and the Donegal county team. He played more than 100 times competitively for Donegal, appearing at all age levels and positions from midfield to forward to defence.

Reid won two All-Ireland titles with his county, and was part of Jim McGuinness's backroom team when they won another in 2012. He also played hurling with the Setanta club.

== Playing career ==
Reid played first with Bundoran and later with the Red Hughs club. He played alongside future Donegal manager Brian McEniff in the team's defence.

Reid first played for his county at the age of 17. He was a replacement All Star in 1980. His brother Bosco graduated to the senior ranks of county football in 1985–6, while another brother, Oliver, played at under-21 level for his county in 1992.

Reid started the 1982 All-Ireland Under-21 Football Championship final, the nineteenth edition of this competition and the first one that Donegal won. 1982 was also his first year as a senior player. With Donegal having an abundant supply of players in defence, Reid played at half forward in the 1983 Ulster Senior Football Championship final, in which Donegal defeated Cavan. He won his second Ulster SFC in 1990. He also won Railway Cup medals in 1989 and 1990, while playing with Ulster against the other provinces.

Reid was a replacement All Star in 1990 and made the trip to both coasts of the United States. Shortly after his return, the 1990 Ulster Senior Football Championship got underway. Donegal recorded victories over Cavan and Derry in the quarter-final and semi-final respectively. Reid played at the back and scored a point in that year's Ulster final against Armagh, which Donegal won.

The pinnacle of Reid's playing career came in 1992, when Donegal won the Sam Maguire Cup. By this time he was 30 years of age and based in Letterkenny, working for Donegal Creameries. Hogan Stand regarded Reid's importance to his county team highly, writing: "Even objective observers of the game in Donegal recognised that the Shovlin, Gavigan and Reid combination probably represented the best line of defence in the country. The Dublin trio of Curran, Carr and Heery were the only other combination which vied for that tag." However, manager Brian McEniff did not select Reid to start Donegal's opening round Ulster SFC match against Cavan at Breffni Park on 24 May. Dropped for the first time in his career, the move proved contentious amongst supporters and team sponsors. An opportunity arose in the first half when Paul Carr was withdrawn. Reid entered play as a substitute and helped Donegal secure a draw. They won the replay. Donegal progressed to the Ulster SFC final, and Reid made his 24th Championship appearance, against Derry.

However, after winning the Ulster SFC (and thereby qualifying for the semi-final of the All-Ireland Senior Football Championship), Reid returned to his club, Red Hughs. Shortly before the All-Ireland SFC semi-final against Mayo, he played in a Donegal County Football Championship match against Termon. An opponent punched Reid towards the end of the game. He sustained a broken jaw and nose and permanent damage to his facial structure, including the loss of many teeth. Even though he was in some discomfort, Reid approached the opposition dressing room door and asked for his assailant to explain his actions. His assailant did not appear, never offered an explanation and did not express sorrow, even in the aftermath. Reid would later regret not having sought legal action. Donegal team doctor Jim McDaid went with Reid to hospital in Letterkenny, where 18 stitches were applied to his gums. Such was the state of his face that his then young daughter cried when she saw him. Reid recovered sufficiently to start at right half back in the 1992 All-Ireland Senior Football Championship Final as Donegal, in their first appearance at this stage of the competition, unexpectedly defeated the then 21-times winners Dublin.

== Retirement ==
Reid retired from inter-county football in the 1990s. According to Declan Bonner, Reid retired following the 1992 All-Ireland SFC Final. Ger Canning mentioned in his commentary during that game that Reid planned to retire afterwards and also referred to the imminent retirement when the game had concluded. However, the Donegal Democrat's Alan Foley wrote in 2009 that a broken shoulder sustained against Armagh in 1993 led to Reid's retirement. He went on to manage the under-21 county team, leading players such as Brian Roper and James Ruane to an Ulster Under-21 Football Championship in 1995.

Having previously spent time working in London's Metropole Hotel as a youth and then been involved in hotel management, Reid retrained in physical therapy and then spent time working as a volunteer at an orphanage in Siret, a town in Romania's Suceava County, on the border with Ukraine. He became infatuated with Romania and asked to learn the language. Then, in 1999, he experienced a year-long breakdown from depression, which he later blamed on a delayed response to the abrupt lack of inter-county football. He described it thus: "So I just avoided people and stayed in the house. But the morning, knowing I had a full day to face, was just terrible. It is nothingness. Your kids don't matter or your wife. Nothing physical. Just this terrible pain. I was suicidal 24/7 for a time. I couldn't be left alone. So I looked forward to nine o'clock and bed". He attended counselling and took medication, eventually recovering.

Reid writes a weekly column in the Donegal Democrat. Married to Maura, the couple have two daughters. He managed such clubs as Red Hughs, Clan na Gael, Gortin, Aghyaran, Robert Emmet's and MacCumhaill's. He was also part of manager Jim McGuinness's backroom team when Donegal won their 2012 All-Ireland SFC title. Reid has played for the Donegal Masters' team (for older men).

In October 2016, Reid's autobiography, Confessions of a Gaelic Footballer, was published. Reid described the completion of the book as his lifelong ambition, while the Donegal News described it as "something of a labour of love". The title references Reid's devotion to his Catholic faith.

In February 2019, Reid put out the flames from a woman whose clothing caught fire during Mass in his local church in Killygordon. The elderly woman had come in close contact with a candle. Reid, seated around four rows behind the woman, saw her ignite and rushed to her aid. He brushed down the flames with his bare hands and pulled her coat from her to prevent any further harm. Reid sustained burns to his hands during the incident. He later explained: "I just saw the light on the woman's coat and realised it was actually on fire. It was soon getting worse".

Reid's name was linked by media with the Fine Gael candidacy for the 1996 Donegal North–East by-election.

== Honours ==
- All-Ireland Senior Football Championship: 1992
- Ulster Senior Football Championship: 1983, 1990, 1992
- All-Ireland Under-21 Football Championship: 1982
- Railway Cup: 1989, 1990

== See also ==
- List of people with major depressive disorder
