= Shane Carr =

Irish Gaelic footballer

Personal information
- Native name: Seaghán Mac Giolla Chathair (Irish)

Sport
- Sport: Gaelic football
- Position: Back
Club
- Years: Club
- 199?–201?: Four Masters
Club titles
- Donegal titles: 1
Inter-county
- Years: County
- 1998–2006: Donegal

Shane Carr is an Irish former Gaelic footballer who played as a defender for Four Masters and the Donegal county team.

His inter-county debut came in a game against Antrim in 1998. He was part of the panel during 1998 and 1999. He came back in 2001. From 2001 he was part of the team until retiring in the spring of 2006. According to the Sunday Independent, Carr left the panel when Eamon McGee moved ahead of him on the substitutes bench despite McGee's poor discipline and lack of dedication.

Carr started the first game of Brian McEniff's last spell as Donegal manager, a league defeat to Galway in Tuam in February 2003.

He played in the 2003 All-Ireland Senior Football Championship semi-final against Armagh.

Carr won the Donegal Senior Football Championship with his club in 2003. He scored three points in the final against Termon.
