= Luke Keaney =

Irish Gaelic footballer

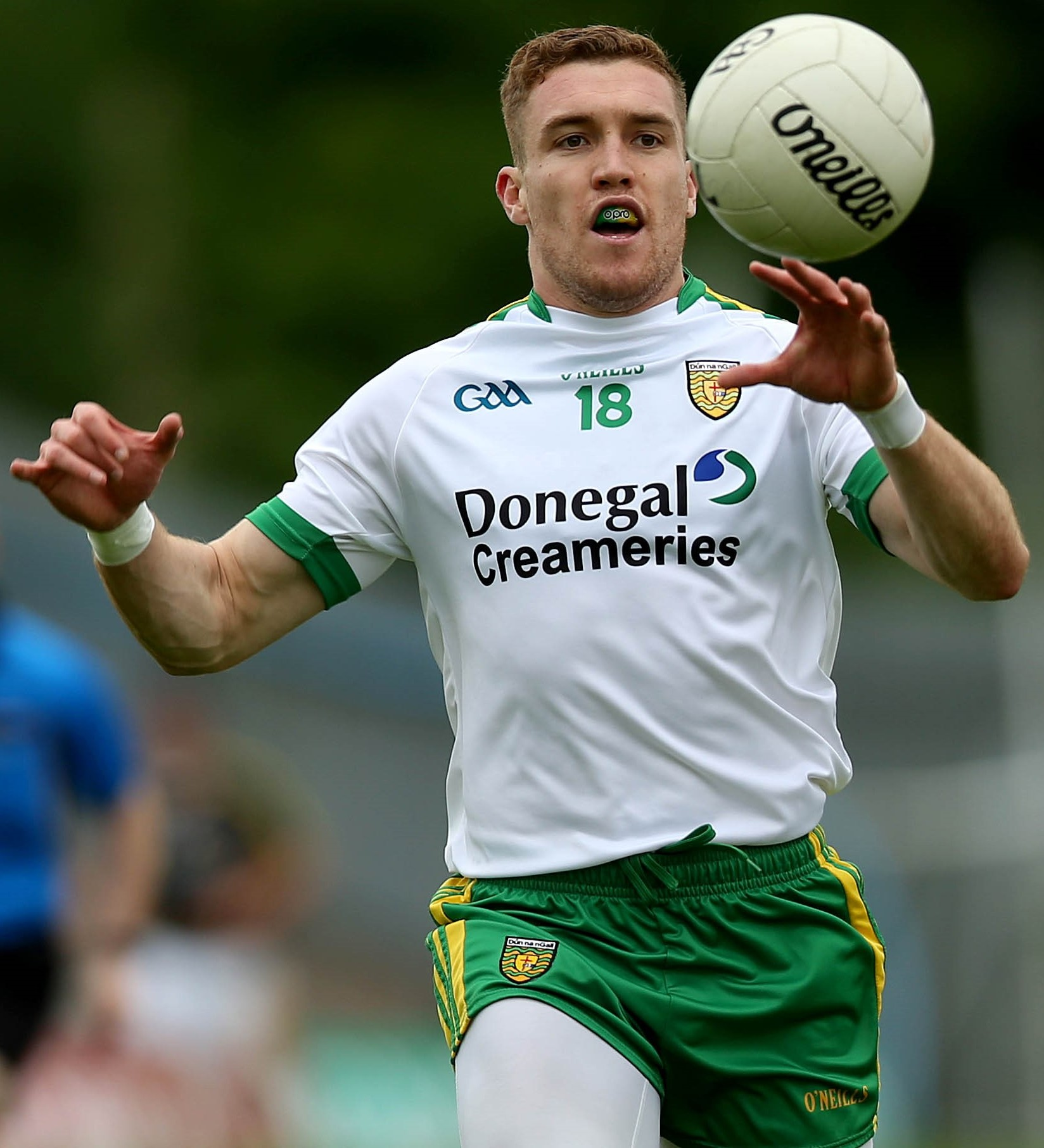
- Luke in action against Antrim in the 2014 Ulster Senior Football Championship

Personal information
- Native name: Lúcas Ó Cianaigh (Irish)
- Born: 18 March 1992 (age 34)

Sport
- Sport: Gaelic football
Club
- Years: Club
- 2008–2017: The Four Masters
College(s)
- Years: College
- 2010–2013 2013–2014: UCD; Ulster University
Inter-county
- Years: County
- 2011–2014: Donegal
Inter-county titles
- Ulster titles: 1
- All Stars: 2014 College All Star

Luke Keaney (born 1992) is an Irish former Gaelic footballer who played for Four Masters and was involved with the Donegal county team for ten years. He is from Donegal Town.

Keaney played in the 2013 Dr McKenna Cup. He made his league debut against Dublin in Ballybofey in the final game of the 2013 National Football League. He studied at and played for UCD.

He also played in the under-21 team that lost to Cavan in the 2013 Ulster final.

He was part of the team that won the 2014 Ulster Senior Football Championship and then reached the 2014 All-Ireland Senior Football Championship Final, but was an unused substitute in that game.

He was still playing for Four Masters in 2016, a year in which he helped his club to a 2–17 to 0–4 win with a goal and a point which he scored from a distance of 50 metres.

In 2017, Keaney had multiple surgeries for injuries which brought his playing career to an end.

== Honours ==
Donegal

- Ulster Senior Football Championship: 2014
