= Martin Gavigan =

Irish Gaelic footballer

Personal information
- Born: Ardara, County Donegal, Ireland
- Occupation: Teacher
- Height: 6 ft 0 in (183 cm)

Sport
- Sport: Gaelic football
- Position: Centre Back
Club
- Years: Club
- c. 1983–1998: Ard an Rátha
Inter-county
- Years: County
- 1982–1997: Donegal
Inter-county titles
- Ulster titles: 2
- All-Irelands: 1

Martin Gavigan is an old Gaelic footballer who played as a defender for Ard an Rátha, the Donegal county team and the Ireland international rules football team.

He was a member of Donegal's 1992 All-Ireland Senior Football Championship winning team. He played for the county from 1988 until 1995.

He played against Armagh in the 1990 Ulster final, won by Donegal.

He started at centre-back in the 1992 All-Ireland Final as Donegal defeated Dublin by a scoreline of 0–18 to 0–14. He would win an All Star in 1992 too.

Known as "Rambo", he was a schoolteacher. In 1992, Hogan Stand was able to indicate that: "Even objective observers of the game in Donegal recognised that the Shovlin, Gavigan and Reid combination probably represented the best line of defence in the country. The Dublin trio of Curran, Carr and Heery were the only other combination which vied for that tag, it was suggested".

He vice-captained Ireland for the 1990 Tour of Australia.

In May 2012, the Irish Independent named him in its selection of Donegal's "greatest team" spanning the previous 50 years.

He got married the Saturday after the 1992 All-Ireland final. His brother Luke also featured for Donegal. Luke's son (and Martin's nephew), Luke Jnr, based with the Seán Mac Cumhaills club, captained the Donegal under-20 team that reached the 2020 Ulster final.

== See also ==
- List of All Stars Awards winners (football)
