= Seamus Bonner =

Irish Gaelic footballer (1948–2012)

Personal information
- Occupation: Garda

Sport
- Sport: Gaelic football
- Position: Midfield / Full Forward
Clubs
- Years: Club
- ?–? ?–? ?–?: Drumbar; Four Masters; Civil Service
Club titles
- Dublin titles: 1
Inter-county
Years	County	Apps (scores)
1972–1985	Donegal	129
Inter-county titles
- Ulster titles: 3

Seamus Bonner (6 November 1948 – 11 October 2012) was an Irish Gaelic footballer who played for various clubs, as well as for the Donegal county team.

Bonner played 129 games for his county between 1972 and 1985, initially in midfield and later at full forward. He made his championship debut against Down at Ballybofey in 1972 and played his last Championship game against Monaghan in 1985. In 1974 he scored seven goals in four games, including one against Galway in that year's All-Ireland semi-final. With Michael McLoone (1966), Bonner (1974) jointly holds the record for Donegal player with the highest score in the same match. In 1983, he became the first Donegal player to win three Ulster Senior Football Championships.

He played his club football for Drumbar, then Four Masters, then Civil Service, captaining the last team to the 1980 Dublin Senior Football Championship.

He later won two more Ulster SFCs as a selector under the managerial reign of Brian McEniff, and was there in 1992 when Donegal won the All-Ireland Senior Football Championship. He was at the time a selector with the Civil Service club, as was one of the Dublin selectors Pat O'Neill. He later managed Leitrim for a short while. He was mentioned as a possible successor to P. J. McGowan as Donegal senior manager in 1997.

Originally from Donegal town, he died after a short illness in 2012. A retired Garda, he was the father of St Brigid's and Dublin footballer Kevin Bonner.

== Honours ==
Player

- Ulster Senior Football Championship: 1972, 1974, 1983
- Dublin Senior Football Championship: 1980 (c.)

Selector

- All-Ireland Senior Football Championship: 1992
- Ulster Senior Football Championship: 1990, 1992
