= Michael Lafferty =

Michael Lafferty is a Gaelic footballer who played with Donegal. He captained them to the 1983 Ulster Title. Lafferty made his championship debut in 1973 and continued making them until 1986, positioned in midfield or centre half-back, and he won two Railway Cups with Ulster in 1983 and 1984.
