= Paul Carr (Gaelic footballer) =

Irish Gaelic footballer

Personal information
- Born: 1961/2
- Occupation: Accountant

Sport
- Sport: Gaelic football
- Position: Forward
Club
- Years: Club
- 19??–19??: St Eunan's
Inter-county
- Years: County
- 1978–19??: Donegal
Inter-county titles
- All-Irelands: 1

Paul Carr (born 1961/2) is an Irish former Gaelic footballer who played for St Eunan's and the Donegal county team.

== Biography ==
Carr attended St Eunan's College in Letterkenny, and played for the school team.

Carr became the youngest player to play at senior level for Donegal when he played at the age of 16 in 1978. He was a member of the Donegal under-21 team that won the 1982 All-Ireland Under-21 Football Championship.

He is an All-Ireland winner with Donegal, one of three representatives from his club on the county panel that won the 1992 All-Ireland Senior Football Championship Final. He started the opening round Ulster Senior Football Championship match against Cavan at Breffni Park on 24 May, but was replaced in the first half by Donal Reid, who had been inexplicably dropped.

Carr spent time in Sligo and managed a Drumcliff-based association football team while there. He later returned to Letterkenny. He remained involved with his club after retiring from playing, and was subsequently appointed as its treasurer and coached its under-age teams.
