= 1982 All-Ireland Under-21 Football Championship =

Gaelic football competition

Championship details

All-Ireland Champions
- Winning team: Donegal (1st win)
- Captain: Brian Tuohy
- Manager: Tom Conaghan

All-Ireland Finalists
- Losing team: Roscommon
- Manager: Martin McDermott

Provincial Champions
- Munster: Cork
- Leinster: Laois
- Ulster: Donegal
- Connacht: Roscommon

The 1982 All-Ireland Under-21 Football Championship was the 19th staging of the All-Ireland Under-21 Football Championship since its establishment by the Gaelic Athletic Association in 1964.

Cork entered the championship as defending champions, however, they were defeated by Roscommon in the All-Ireland semi-final.

Donegal won the championship following an 0–8 to 0–5 defeat of Roscommon in the All-Ireland final. This was their fourth All-Ireland title overall and their second in successive seasons.

The following players won the Sam Maguire Cup with their county in 1992: Paul Carr, Matt Gallagher, Martin McHugh, Joyce McMullan, Sylvester Maguire, Anthony Molloy, Charlie Mulgrew and Donal Reid.
