= Martin McHugh (Gaelic footballer) =

Irish Gaelic football player

Personal information
- Native name: Máirtín Mac Aodh (Irish)
- Nickname: The Wee Man
- Born: 1961 (age 64–65) Letterkenny, Ireland
- Height: 1.7 m (5 ft 7 in)

Sport
- Sport: Gaelic football
- Position: Centre forward
Club
- Years: Club
- 19??–?: Cill Chartha
Club titles
- Donegal titles: 4
Inter-county
Years	County	Apps (scores)
1981–1994	Donegal	138 (16–396)
Inter-county titles
- Ulster titles: 3
- All-Irelands: 1
- NFL: 0
- All Stars: 2

Martin McHugh (born 1961) is a former Gaelic footballer, manager and media pundit. He is a native of Kilcar, County Donegal.

McHugh was a member of the Donegal county team that won the 1992 All-Ireland Senior Football Championship. He also won three Ulster Senior Football Championships, two All Stars and, in 1992, the Texaco Footballer of the Year.

He works as a pundit on the BBC Television's coverage of the Ulster Championship and has made occasional appearances on RTÉ Television during other competitions. He has also managed Cavan and IT Sligo.

McHugh's sons, Mark and Ryan, also played for Donegal.

== Playing career ==
=== Club ===
McHugh played Gaelic football with his local club Cill Chartha. He won the Donegal Senior Football Championship with the club on four occasions: 1980, 1985, 1989 and 1993.

=== Inter-county ===
McHugh was a member of the Donegal county team at senior level between 1981 and 1994.

He won the 1982 All-Ireland Under-21 Football Championship with Donegal.

McHugh wore the number 13 jersey for the 1983 Ulster Senior Football Championship final against Cavan. However, he played at centre-forward as Charlie Mulgrew had sustained a broken jaw in the semi-final victory over Monaghan. McHugh either contributed 0–6 (The Irish News, 2019) or 0–7 (Donegal Democrat, 2009) of Donegal's 1–14. However, he did not receive a man-of-the-match award, which instead went to clubmate Michael Carr (in a repeat occurrence from the 1980 Donegal Senior Football Championship final). McHugh also may have had a part in the penalty which Cavan conceded when his flick to Pauric Carr resulted in Carr being brought to the ground (The Irish News, 2019). Yet Kieran Keeney was also brought to the ground to win the same penalty in an incident that appeared not to involve McHugh (Donegal Democrat, 2009). McHugh was substituted in the second half after sustaining a shoulder injury. He spent time in hospital with a punctured lung after the 1983 final. He won his first All Star Award later that year.

McHugh was a replacement All Star in 1990 and made the trip to both coasts of the United States. Shortly after his return, the 1990 Ulster Senior Football Championship got underway. McHugh had a groin injury and could not play in the quarter-final win over Cavan. He returned for the semi-final win over Derry. He then played against Armagh and scored four points (including two frees and one 45) in the 1990 Ulster final, won by Donegal. He then played in Donegal's All-Ireland semi-final defeat to Meath. He was substituted and later said himself: "That was a bad day… It was one of them games… It was one of them games where the game just bypassed me. I never got into the game, I don't exactly know what happened". In a restaurant in Cavan on the way back, someone came over and rubbed salt into his wounds by saying: "Where was your famous Martin McHugh today?", seemingly oblivious to McHugh's presence.

McHugh later became an All-Ireland winner with Donegal in 1992. He also won his second All Star Award that year and was voted 1992 Player of the Year.

In total he won three Ulster senior titles with Donegal: 1983, 1990 and 1992.

His brother, James McHugh, also played in the 1992 All-Ireland Final and received an All Star in 1992. His first-born son Mark also won an All-Ireland Senior Football Championship while playing for Donegal in 2012. Mark was born the Wednesday after Martin McHugh's Donegal side were defeated by Meath in the semi-final of the 1990 All-Ireland Senior Football Championship. McHugh's son Ryan has also played for Donegal.

== Management career ==
McHugh wanted to take charge of Donegal after 1992 All-Ireland manager Brian McEniff left the job. However, he was not selected by the Donegal County Board. McHugh was reputedly hurt by his rejection, saying: "I thought there was another All-Ireland in Donegal and that's why I went for that job. I thought there was another All-Ireland there, and there was a lot of good players coming too. But anyway, that's the way it worked out". Tony Boyle "selfishly" wanted McHugh to carry on playing.

McHugh had also received an offer to manage Cavan in 1994, which he took up shortly after being rejected by Donegal. He led them to the 1994–95 National Football League Division 3 title. In 1997, he helped Cavan win an Ulster Senior Football Championship for the first time in 28 years. He resigned in August 1997, citing his wish to put his family life first.

McHugh has also managed Sligo IT, leading the college to Sigerson Cup success.

He was managing his club's senior team in 2016.

He declined the Donegal job in 2008, telling BBC Sport "I don't have the time".

However, he told the Donegal News in January 2022: "I would still love to manage Donegal. I'd love to manage my own county… It would be something I'd like to do. There's a bucket list there when you get to my age, and I'd still like to have a crack with Donegal".

== Media career ==
As of 2012, McHugh was working as a GAA pundit for BBC Television and Radio and was also writing for the Irish Daily Star newspaper. In 2012, as Donegal advanced towards their second All-Ireland success, McHugh appeared on The Sunday Game on RTÉ. He was on the programme the night Donegal won the 2012 All-Ireland Senior Football Championship Final.

At the end of the 2012 All-Ireland Senior Football Championship Final, with McHugh on the sideline working for BBC television coverage of the game, his son Mark, part of the victorious Donegal team, ran to embrace him. Martin McHugh burst into tears as the full extent of what had happened hit him. The emotional moment, as Martin recalled the death of his father Jim the previous October and his mother Kathleen's Alzheimer's, was widely broadcast and became one of the "iconic images" of the victory.

In 2013, he called for change to the All-Ireland Senior Football Championship and stated that the back door only helped stronger counties such as his own.

In 2014, McHugh described the Kerry forward, Colm Cooper as a "two-trick pony". Many in Kerry received this badly.

During television coverage of the 2021 Ulster Senior Football Championship game between Donegal and Derry, McHugh said some of the players on the pitch were not of inter-county standard. At a press event ahead of the 2022 National Football League (which marked Allianz's long-term involvement with that competition), McHugh was asked about those remarks. He said: "I just felt — and I watched him last night again (in the Sigerson Cup) and he played very well — that Jason McGee was a player we needed off the bench. I said that we had players to come off the bench… I was very annoyed at half-time, and I was worried and I felt we needed to get players, who were on the bench, on the field, and we needed to get them on quickly because I could see that game slipping away. I think there was a lot made about that. I suppose when you have the passion for your county, maybe you say things on live TV, and you have to say it as you see it".

== Other activities ==
McHugh owns Spirits and Liquor Limited.

He put himself forward for the role of Donegal's delegate to central council in 2009 but, though he was ahead after the first count, he was ultimately rejected. It was the first time McHugh had sought a position on the county board. He expressed a lack of interest in any other roles on the Donegal board as the role he was pursuing would have allowed him into Croke Park, where he hoped to influence the development of club football.

== Personal life ==
McHugh is a grandfather. He has two sons and a daughter. He is married to Patrice, sons Mark and Ryan are both All Star winners with Donegal, while he also has a daughter, Rachel.

== Career statistics ==
Team	Season	Ulster		All-Ireland		Total	
Team	Season	Apps	Score	Apps	Score	Apps	Score
Donegal	1981	1	0–4	0	0–0	1	0–4
Donegal	1982	1	0–8	0	0–0	1	0–8
Donegal	1983	2	0–12	1	0–5	3	0–17
Donegal	1984	0	0–0	0	0–0	0	0–0
Donegal	1985	2	1–13	0	0–0	2	1–13
Donegal	1986	1	0–3	0	0–0	1	0–3
Donegal	1987	1	0–0	0	0–0	1	0–0
Donegal	1988	1	0–4	0	0–0	1	0–4
Donegal	1989	4	2–16	0	0–0	4	2–16
Donegal	1990	3	0–8	1	0–1	4	0–9
Donegal	1991	3	0–2	0	0–0	3	0–2
Donegal	1992	4	0–12	2	0–4	6	0–16
Donegal	1993	3	0–7	0	0–0	3	0–7
Donegal	1994	2	0–2	0	0–0	2	0–2
Total		28	3–91	4	0–10	32	3–101

== Honours ==
=== Player ===
Donegal

- All-Ireland Senior Football Championship: 1992
- Ulster Senior Football Championship: 1983, 1990, 1992
- All-Ireland Under-21 Football Championship: 1982
- Ulster Under-21 Football Championship: 1982

Cill Chartha

- Donegal Senior Football Championship: 1980, 1985, 1989, 1993

=== Individual ===
- Texaco Footballer of the Year: 1992
- All Star: 1983, 1992
- In 2009, McHugh was voted as Donegal's best ever footballer in the 125-year history of the Gaelic Athletic Association in a poll carried out by the Donegal Democrat.
- In May 2012, the Irish Independent's named McHugh in Donegal's "greatest team", spanning the previous 50 years.
- Silver Jubilee Football Team of the Ulster GAA Writers Association (UGAAWA) nomination: 2012
- In May 2020, the Irish Independent named McHugh as one of the "dozens of brilliant players" who narrowly missed selection for its "Top 20 footballers in Ireland over the past 50 years".

=== Manager ===
Cavan

- Ulster Senior Football Championship: 1997
- National Football League Division 3: 1995

Sligo IT

- Sigerson Cup: 2004, 2005
