= Donegal v Dublin (2014 All-Ireland Senior Football Championship) =

2014 All-Ireland Football Semi-Final
- Event: 2014 All-Ireland Senior Football Championship Semi-final
Donegal	Dublin
3–14 (23)	0–17 (17)
- Date: 31 August 2014
- Venue: Croke Park, Dublin
- Man of the Match: Ryan McHugh
- Referee: Joe McQuillan (Cavan)
- Attendance: 81,500

The Donegal vs Dublin football match that took place on 31 August 2014 at Croke Park in Dublin, Ireland, was the second semi-final match of the 2014 All-Ireland Senior Football Championship. Both teams reached the stage with an undefeated record in the competition. The game was administered by Cavan officials led by Kill Shamrocks referee Joe McQuillan. The result was a loss for the Dublin — reigning League, Leinster and All-Ireland Champions. Having been down 0–8 – 0–3 down after 23 minutes, Donegal led 1–8 – 0–10 at half time. Donegal subsequently added two more goals in the second half. Donegal's Ryan McHugh was selected man of the match.

Donegal's win was their first against Dublin in the Championship since the 1992 Final and only their second ever. The game was the only Championship loss suffered by Jim Gavin as Dublin senior manager, a role he held for much of the decade until his resignation in the last weeks of 2019. Ryan McHugh's opening goal was the first goal Dublin had conceded against Donegal in the Championship. Colm McFadden's goal equalled the total number of goals Dublin had managed to score against Donegal in four previous Championship meetings.

The outcome was widely considered the greatest shock in the history of the Championship, with Dublin placed at unbackable odds by bookmakers on the morning of the game and anticipation rife of a "massacre" by the citizens of the north-western side. The game had a 60.2 % audience share on RTÉ and was also broadcast on Sky Sports.

== Background ==
Dublin were reigning All-Ireland champions, had put together two All-Irelands in three years, back-to-back league titles and four consecutive provincial championships. Manager Jim Gavin was undefeated in Championship football. They were hosting Donegal on home turf at Croke Park, and had won the tournament on twenty-four previous occasions. They were expected to produce their first back-to-back Championship-winning season since 1977. When the teams had last met in the Championship, in the 2011 semi-final, Dublin had beaten Donegal on their way to becoming All-Ireland champions.

Dublin's route to the semi-final included Leinster Championship victories over Laois, Wexford and Meath and an All-Ireland quarter-final thrashing of Monaghan. Donegal's route to the semi-final included Ulster Championship victories over Derry, Antrim and Monaghan and an All-Ireland quarter-final defeat of Armagh. The two teams had met in four previous Championship matches, with Dublin having by far the better record. Indeed, Donegal entered the game having never scored a goal against Dublin in Championship football.

Each side made two late changes: David Walsh and Rory Kavanagh were placed into the Donegal attack, while youngsters Jack McCaffrey and Cormac Costello came in for Dublin.

Dublin were placed at unbackable odds by bookmakers on the morning of the game and anticipation was rife of a "massacre" by the citizens of the north-western side. Seán Moran, an "expert" at The Irish Times, declared ahead of the game that "Dublin are too well equipped to live with whatever pressure Donegal can exert. Physically they're not going to wilt and mentally they've been good at patiently waiting for teams to blow themselves out." Some experts even suggested that the only team capable of beating Dublin and denying them a third Sam Maguire Cup in four years, never mind a place in the All-Ireland Final against Kerry, was their own substitutes.

The bookmakers took a bashing. It was Paddy Power's worst result in its history.

== Match ==
=== First half ===
The game opened with a James McCarthy foul on Rory Kavanagh. Referee Joe McQuillan showed McCarthy the yellow card. Donegal captain Michael Murphy pointed the free to give Donegal an early lead. Paul Flynn tied the game and Bernard Brogan gave Dublin the lead. Diarmuid Connolly put them two points ahead and Paul Flynn added his second point of the game to give Dublin a three-point lead after six minutes of play. Dublin goalkeeper Stephen Cluxton then sent a '45 well wide of the posts. Karl Lacey provided Donegal's second score of the game after 13 minutes. Paul Flynn scored his third point and Dublin's first for more than ten minutes. Diarmuid Connolly and Philly McMahon added to Dublin's lead before Michael Murphy brought the score to 0–7 – 0–3. Dublin added another point to bring the scoreline to Dublin 0–8 Donegal 0–3 after 23 minutes. Rory Kavanagh scored Donegal's fourth point. Then Paul Durcan was on hand to tip away Diarmuid Connolly's goal-bound shot. However, Connolly added another point minutes later. Donegal substitute Christy Toye passed to Ryan McHugh who scored Donegal's fifth point, quickly followed by a sixth from the boot of Odhrán Mac Niallais and a seventh from that of Michael Murphy. Then a long ball dropped into Michael Murphy, Dublin goalkeeper Stephen Cluxton came and flapped, Colm McFadden caught the ball and passed to Ryan McHugh who slotted home past Cluxton and through the legs of several disbelieving Dublin players. Colm McFadden pointed a free to put Donegal two points ahead. Donegal led at the break on a scoreline of 1–8 to 0–10.

=== Second half ===
A run from Anthony Thompson picked out Ryan McHugh who knocked the ball into the net past a hapless Stephen Cluxton. Alan and Bernard Brogan responded with points for Dublin. Frank McGlynn scored a point for Donegal. Dublin sent some shots badly wide. Colm McFadden closed in on Stephen Cluxton and Donegal had an unprecedented third goal. McFadden added to his goal with a point. Diarmuid Connolly and Bernard Brogan scored points for Dublin. Ryan McHugh closed in on Stephen Cluxton once again — Cluxton tipped a goal-bound shot over the crossbar with his fingertips to give Donegal a point where another goal appeared likely. Paddy Andrews, a substitute for the startled Alan Brogan, and Diarmuid Connolly added points for Dublin. Donegal substitute Patrick McBrearty added two impressive points of his own. Bernard Brogan missed a seemingly easy free for Dublin. Dublin hit wide after wide. The referee blew his whistle to bring the game to an end.

=== Details ===
31 August 2014
Semi-final
Donegal

3–14 (23) – 0–17 (17)
Dublin

Croke Park, Dublin
Attendance: 81,500
Referee: Joe McQuillan (Cavan)
- Ryan McHugh 2–2
- Colm McFadden 1–3
- Michael Murphy 0–3 (2f)
- Patrick McBrearty 0–2
- Karl Lacey 0–1
- Frank McGlynn 0–1
- Odhrán Mac Niallais 0–1
- Rory Kavanagh 0–1
Report
- Diarmuid Connolly 0–5 (1f)
- Paul Flynn 0–4
- Bernard Brogan 0–3 (1f)
- Alan Brogan 0–2
- Paddy Andrews 0–2
- Philly McMahon 0–1

Donegal	Dublin

== Reactions ==
=== Media ===
Seán Moran in The Irish Times said it was Donegal's best Championship match since their last All-Ireland-winning season and Dublin's worst since that time. Malachy Clerkin described the outcome as "a raid for the ages [...] In front of 81,500 sets of eyes, [Donegal] left Dublin looking like an old sweater turned inside out, its edges frayed and its patterns fuzzy". John O'Keeffe said Donegal "hadn't just beaten Dublin but completely dismantled them [...] once Donegal got themselves into a commanding position, Dublin looked very ordinary." Keith Duggan described Donegal's defeat of Dublin as "the most glorious proof of [...] a game plan which is unlike anything witnessed in Gaelic football before" and alluded to Muhammad Ali's cry: I shocked the world! I shocked the world, "So too did Donegal. Their 3–14 to 0–17 unravelling of the All-Ireland champions was one of the great championship triumphs". Ian O'Riordan called Dublin's collapse "a spectacular eruption of near volcanic proportions".

The BBC described as "a huge shock" that Dublin "the 'team that couldn't be beaten' wilted as their composure deserted them" and suggested there would be "major inquests in the Irish capital about what went wrong for Jim Gavin's side". Sky Sports described the result as "stunning".

Pundit Martin McHugh said after the game that Jim McGuinness was "the best manager Donegal have ever had, and one of the best in any county in the modern era."

=== Players ===
Dublin player James McCarthy pointed to the number of goals Dublin had allowed Donegal to score. "We let three in today and you can't do that in All-Ireland semi-finals. You just can't do it. They were sloppy goals as well, preventable goals. But you live by the sword, you die by the sword. We got caught forward when we should have been back cutting out and competing for those balls."

Man of the match Ryan McHugh described himself as "fortunate" to have scored his two goals.

Former Mayo player Billy Joe Padden described Donegal manager Jim McGuinness as "the greatest GAA coach of all time". Former Roscommon player Shane Curran described him as the best tactical manager the sport had ever seen. Former Tyrone All-Ireland winner Peter Canavan described it as Jim McGuinness's "finest hour".

=== Coaches ===
Ireland manager Paul Earley hailed Donegal's victory as Jim McGuinness's greatest coaching achievement.

Sports psychologist Enda McNulty said the “hype machine” surrounding Dublin had caused them to collapse against Donegal. "The hype around this Dublin team over the past three months was phenomenal; I've never seen the likes of it. There was some of the Dublin party saying this was like an All Blacks team. Now, I was part of the Ireland back-room staff when they played against the All Blacks [...] Even the All Blacks are fallible. So if the All Blacks are fallible, why then are the Dublin team not fallible?"

Dublin manager Jim Gavin admitted Dublin were defeated by "a better Donegal team".

Donegal minor manager Declan Bonner criticised Dublin's "juvenile" defending and said he was "surprised me how Dublin folded easily. Their defensive shape just disappeared. There were gaping holes right through the middle of their defence. [...] There was no defensive plan. We could have got five goals."

Kerry minor manager Jack O'Connor said Dublin “got sucked into the opposition half of the field. [...] got suckered into all-out attack and leaving vast acres at the back. It cost them for the goals. [...] they left huge space in front of their full-back line and sooner or later the dam was going to break.”

== Aftermath ==
Donegal advanced to the 2014 All-Ireland Senior Football Championship Final to meet Kerry on 21 September 2014, a first such pairing on All-Ireland Final day. Kerry won the game by 2–9 to 0–12.

Dublin would go on to win the next six All-Irelands in a row; this 2014 loss to Donegal was Dublin's last championship defeat until the 2021 All-Ireland SFC semi-final.

== See also ==
- All-Ireland Senior Football Championship records and statistics
- 1992 All-Ireland Senior Football Championship Final
