= Joyce McMullin =

Irish Gaelic footballer

Personal information
- Born: 1963 (age 62–63) County Donegal
- Occupation: Insurance broker
- Height: 5 ft 9 in (175 cm)

Sport
- Sport: Gaelic football
- Position: Wing Forward
Club
- Years: Club
- ?–?: Four Masters
Club titles
- Donegal titles: 2
Inter-county
- Years: County
- 1983–?: Donegal
Inter-county titles
- Ulster titles: 3
- All-Irelands: 1
- All Stars: 1

Joyce McMullin is an Irish former Gaelic footballer who played for Four Masters and the Donegal county team.

He was a member of the team that won Donegal's first All-Ireland title in 1992, and was selected as an All Star in 1990.

Born in County Donegal, Ireland, McMullin played senior football for Donegal from 1983 to 1999.

== Playing career ==
=== Club ===
McMullin played with Four Masters, his local club in Donegal Town, from an early age. He was part of the team which won the club's first two Donegal Senior Football Championship medals, in 1982 and 1984, before emigration led to a decline in the club's fortunes for the rest of his tenure there.

=== Inter-county ===
He won the 1982 All-Ireland Under-21 Football Championship with Donegal.

McMullin made his senior debut for Donegal in 1981, at the age of 18. He helped them to win the 1983 Ulster Senior Football Championship, playing against Cavan in that year's final. He was again part of the provincial championship winning side of 1990, the same year as he was awarded his only All Star.

He played against Armagh in the 1990 Ulster final, won by Donegal.

In 1992, he again won an Ulster Championship medal, and this time, helped his team to win the All-Ireland final as well. It was shortly before this match that the manager at the time, Brian McEniff was informed that McMullin's brother, Gerard, had died from cancer. He chose not to inform McMullin or anyone else on the team until after the match. It later emerged that there had been a miscommunication, and that McMullin's brother had not died. He did so a year later.

Joyce McMullin was part of the Donegal Masters' wins in 2002 and 2003.

== See also ==
- List of All Stars Awards winners (football)
