= Gary Walsh (Gaelic footballer) =

Irish Gaelic footballer and coach

Personal information
- Occupation: Accountant

Sport
- Sport: Gaelic football
- Position: Goalkeeper
Clubs
- Years: Club
- 19??–19?? 19??–19??: Aodh Ruadh; Burren
Inter-county
- Years: County
- 1984–1996: Donegal
Inter-county titles
- Ulster titles: 2
- All-Irelands: 1
- All Stars: 1

Gary Walsh is an Irish Gaelic football coach and former goalkeeper for Aodh Ruadh, Burren and the Donegal county team.

He is from Ballyshannon.

He received his secondary education at De La Salle College Ballyshannon. As of 2009, he lived in Derry and worked as an accountant with Derry City Council.

He played against Armagh in the 1990 Ulster Senior Football Championship final, won by Donegal.

He played for his county from 1984 to 1996 and was a member of its 1992 All-Ireland SFC winning team. He conceded only 3 goals in 6 matches of the 1992 championship. He won an All Star Award.

He won two Down Senior Football Championships with Burren. He missed the 1992 Down SFC final so that he could play for Donegal in the All-Ireland SFC final the following week.

After retiring, he assisted Brian McEniff as a goalkeeping coach when McEniff returned as Donegal manager in the early 2000s; Tony Blake credits Walsh with helping him have his best season in 2003.

His brother Eunan is a coach with St Eunan's GAA and a Garda who, as of 2021, was Sergeant in Charge of Letterkenny Garda Station, a town in which he spent much of his career in policing.

== Honours ==
Donegal

- All-Ireland Senior Football Championship: 1992
- Ulster Senior Football Championship: 1990, 1992

Burren

- Down Senior Football Championship: 1996, 1997

Individual

- All Star: 1992
