= Vinnie Murphy =

Irish Gaelic footballer and hurler

Vincent Murphy
Personal information
- Native name: Uinseann Ó Murchú (Irish)
- Nickname: Vinnie
- Born: 2 December 1969 (age 56) Dublin, Ireland

Sport
- Football Position: Full forward
- Hurling Position: Full forward
Clubs
- Years: Club
- 1988-1996, 2000-2003 1996-1999 2003-2013: Trinity Gaels; Kerins O'Rahilly's; St Monica's
Inter-county**
| Years | County | Apps (scores) |
| 1988-1996, 2000-2001 1998 | Dublin (F); Kerry (H) | 118 (25–138); 3 (1-06) |
Inter-county titles
| | Football | Hurling |
| Leinster Titles | 5 | - |
| All-Ireland Titles | 1 | - |
| All-Stars | 1 | - |
- **Inter County team apps and scores correct as of 10:04, 2 December 2008 (UTC)~.

Vincent 'Vinnie' Murphy is a former Gaelic footballer and media personality who played at senior level for the Dublin county team.

== Club ==
=== Trinity Gaels, Dublin ===
He played with Junior club Trinity Gaels of Donaghmede throughout his career with Dublin.

=== Kerins O'Rahilly's, Kerry ===
He left for them for work purposes to live in Kerry, where he lined out for the Kerins O Rahillys club from 1996–1999 winning multiple Town Championships and a County League in 1999 against An Ghealteact scoring 1-4 in the final. He averaged over seven points a game in his time in Tralee for the club.

=== Trinity Gaels, Dublin ===
He returned in 2000 to Trinity Gaels but left in 2003 to join their neighbours, St Monica's of Edenmore.

=== St. Monica's, Dublin ===
Working initially in a coaching capacity with St Monica's, he guided them to the Dublin Division 6 title in 2003. Following his playing transfer, Murphy resumed his duties at full forward from 2004 onwards, with Monica's narrowly missing out on the end-of-season playoffs in 2004 and 2005.

However, the team recovered from their near-misses and, in 2006, completed a league and cup double. The team won the Division 5 title, losing only once throughout the campaign and defeating their nearest rivals, St Brigid's of Castleknock by 5-11 to 0-6 in the decisive game. They also picked up the Conlon Cup, defeating Round towers of Clondalkin in the final.

Murphy graciously received the 2006 Terry Monaghan award for Outstanding Clubman of the Year, for his efforts both on and off the pitch. In 2007, St Monica's won promotion to Division 3 and captured the cup under Vinnie's management.

== Inter-County ==
=== Dublin ===
He made his debut for Dublin in 1988 while still in the Minor ranks.

He won an All Star for his performances with Dublin in 1992 and won two National Football League division one titles in 1991 and 1993. He also won five Leinster senior medals in 1989 and 1992–94. His ability to win ball was unprecedented for a man under 6 ft tall, the timing of his spring and ability to hang in the air was well noted.

In the 1992 All-Ireland Senior Football Championship Final he was triple marked because of his aerial threat by the fullback and two midfielders; however he still won 19 possessions in a game where his man (that year's All Star number 3) never kicked the ball during the game and only touched the ball three times.

Murphy came on as a substitute in Dublin's 1995 All-Ireland Senior Football Championship victory over Tyrone.

In his latter years when he came on the pitch for Dublin as a super sub, he had a ceremonious jog onto the pitch, much like an unstoppable rhino, he'd send his opposite number tumbling with a shoulder clash.

=== Kerry (Hurling) ===
He also played for Kerry in the Munster Hurling C/ship V Cork scoring 1-3 in the defeat in 1998. He also played Leinster senior championship with the Dublin hurlers in 1988 V Offaly and then again in 1995 V Kilkenny.

== Honours ==
=== Dublin ===
- All-Ireland Senior Football Championship (1): 1995
- Leinster Senior Football Championship (5): 1989, 1992, 1993, 1994, 1995
- National Football League (2): 1991, 1993

=== Individual ===
- GAA GPA All Stars Awards (1): 1992
