= 1992 All-Ireland Senior Football Championship =

Football championship

Championship details
- Dates: 17 May 1992 – 20 September 1992
- Teams: 32

All-Ireland Champions
- Winning team: Donegal (1st win)
- Captain: Anthony Molloy
- Manager: Brian McEniff

All-Ireland Finalists
- Losing team: Dublin
- Captain: Tommy Carr
- Manager: Paddy Cullen

Provincial Champions
- Munster: Clare
- Leinster: Dublin
- Ulster: Donegal
- Connacht: Mayo

Championship statistics
- No. matches played: 33
- Top Scorer: Charlie Redmond (1–28)
- Player of the Year: Martin McHugh

The 1992 All-Ireland Senior Football Championship was the 106th staging of the All-Ireland Senior Football Championship, the Gaelic Athletic Association's premier inter-county Gaelic football tournament. The championship began on 17 May 1992 and ended on 20 September 1992.

Down entered the championship as the defending champions; however, they were defeated by Derry in the Ulster semi-final.

Clare shocked many people by defeating Kerry in the Munster final to win only their second provincial senior title (their first having come in 1917); they narrowly lost to Dublin in the All-Ireland semi-final.

Ulster champions Donegal then defeated Dublin in the All-Ireland final by 0–18 to 0–14, thus claiming their first All-Ireland senior title.

== Results ==
=== Connacht Senior Football Championship ===
Quarter-finals

31 May 1992 Quarter-final	London	2–10 – 3–17	Leitrim	Emerald GAA Grounds, Ruislip
	J Duffy 0–6, K McBride 1–0, J Costello 1–0, T Maguire 0–2, M McLoughlin 0–1, L Molloy 0–1.		B Breen 2–7, L Conlon 1–2, P Kiernan 0–2, B Duignan 0–2, M Quinn 0–1, C Mahon 0–1, S Heslin 0–1, P Kenny 0–1.	Attendance: 3,000; Referee: P Serriter (Galway)

14 June 1992 Quarter-final	Galway	1–11 – 1–11	Mayo	Tuam Stadium, Tuam
	F O'Neill 1–5, V Daly 0–2, J Fallon 0–2, K Walsh 0–1, A Mulholland 0–1.		L McHale 1–1, J Jennings 0–4, B Kilkelly 0–2, N Durcan 0–1, TJ Kilgallon 0–1, R Dempsey 0–1, P McStay 0–1.	Attendance: 18,000; Referee: E Neary (Sligo)

21 June 1992 Quarter-final replay	Mayo	0–15 – 1–6	Galway	McHale Park, Castlebar
	R Dempsey 0–8, N Durcan 0–2, J Jennings 0–2, T Morley 0–1, L McHale 0–1, B Kilkelly 0–1.		V Daly 1–1, J Fallon 0–3, F O'Neill 0–1, S Glynn 0–1.	Attendance: 18,000; Referee: E Neary (Sligo)

Semi-finals

28 June 1992 Semi-final	Roscommon	2–11 – 1–9	Leitrim	Dr. Hyde Park, Roscommon
	D Duggan 1–7, S Grehan 1–2, V Glennon 0–1, T McManus 0–1.		B Breen 0–6, P Kiernan 1–1, L Conlon 0–1, D Darcy 0–1.	Attendance: 10,000; Referee: S McHale (Mayo)

5 July 1992 Semi-final	Mayo	1–11 – 0–10	Sligo	McHale Park, Castlebar
	R Dempsey 0–4, N Durcan 1–0, B Kilkenny 0–2, K Staunton 0–1, P Forde 0–1, J Jennings 0–1, T Morley 0–1, A Finnerty 0–1.		F Feeney 0–4, J Kenny 0–2, B Kilcoyne 0–2, E Deignan 0–1, T Deignan 0–1.	Attendance: 8,000; Referee: S Prior (Leitrim)

Final

26 July 1992 Final	Mayo	1–14 – 0–10	Roscommon	McHale Park, Castlebar
	R Dempsey 1–2, A Finnerty 0–3, K Staunton 0–3, TJ Kilgallon 0–2, P Brogan 0–1, J Jennings 0–2, T Morley 0–1.		T McManus 0–3, T Grehan 0–2, D Duggan 0–2, P Earley 0–1, E McManus 0–1, S Killoran 0–1.	Attendance: 30,000; Referee: S Prior (Leitrim)

=== Leinster Senior Football Championship ===
Preliminary round

24 May 1992 Preliminary round	Longford	2–8 – 2–18	Wicklow	Pearse Park, Longford
	J McCormack 1–2, D Barry 0–4, P Victory 1–0, B O'Connor 0–1, K O'Rourke 0–1.		P Baker 0–8, K O'Brien 1–2, R Coffey 1–1, T Allen 0–2, R Duane 0–2, C Day 0–2, F Daly 0–1.

24 May 1992 Preliminary round	Meath	1–11 – 2–11	Laois	Páirc Tailteann, Navan
	B Stafford 0–7, T Dowd 1–1, C O'Rourke 0–2, M O'Connell 0–1.		M Turley 1–3, L Turley 0–4, T McMahon 1–0, M Lawlor 0–3, C Maher 0–1.	Referee: T Howard (Kildare)

31 May 1992 Preliminary round	Offaly	1–9 – 2–17	Dublin	O'Connor Park, Tullamore
	V Claffey 1–0, D Reynolds 0–3, B Lowry 0–3, S Dunne 0–1, J Stewart 0–1, P Dunne 0–1.		C Redmond 1–2, P Clarke 0–4, P Doherty 1–0, V Murphy 0–3, P Gilroy 0–2, J Sheedy 0–2, N Guiden 0–2, D Farrell 0–2.	Attendance: 15,000; Referee: N Whelan (Wexford)

Quarter-finals

7 June 1992 Quarter-final	Westmeath	1–9 – 0–8	Carlow	Cusack Park, Mullingar
	L Giles 1–5, D Prendergast 0–2, S Murphy 0–1, J Cooney 0–1.		P Molloy 0–2, J Navin 0–2, L Kearns 0–1, J Hayden 0–1, J Walsh 0–1, M Slbald 0–1.	Referee: J Woods (Dublin)

14 June 1992 Quarter-final	Kildare	1–20 – 1–6	Wicklow	Croke Park, Dublin
	N Buckley 0–7, D Kerrigan 1–1, M Lynch 0–4, B Fahy 0–3, T Harris 0–2, J Gilroy 0–1, J McDonald 0–1, S McGovern 0–1.		T Allan 1–0, P Baker 0–3, K O'Brien 0–3.	Attendance: 40,374; Referee: B White (Wexford)

14 June 1992 Quarter-final	Louth	0–13 – 1–9	Laois	Croke Park, Dublin
	C Kelly 0–6, S White 0–2, C O'Hanlon 0–1, D Brady 0–1, N Browne 0–1, S O'Hanlon 0–1, J Osborne 0–1.		M Lawlor 1–1, M Turley 0–4, T Maher 0–1, C Maher 0–1, H Emerson 0–1, M O'Brien 0–1.	Attendance: 40,374; Referee: P Collins (Westmeath)

28 June 1992 Quarter-final	Dublin	1–18 – 0–11	Wexford	O'Moore Park, Portlaoise
	C Redmond 0–7, V Murphy 1–0, P Clarke 0–3, J Sheedy 0–2, N Guiden 0–2, D Farrell 0–2, K Barr 0–1, M Galvin 0–1.		B Dodd 0–7, M Hendrick 0–1, E Cleary 0–1, J Harrington 0–1, S Fitzhenry 0–1.	Referee: T Howard (Kildare)

Semi-finals

5 July 1992 Semi-final	Kildare	4–11 – 2–5	Westmeath	O'Connor Park, Tullamore
	J Gilroy 2–1, N Buckley 0–7, D Kerrigan 1–1, J McDonald 1–1, B Fahy 0–1.		L Giles 1–3, B Kenny 1–0, J Cooney 0–1, D Keane 0–1.	Referee: P Russell (Tipperary)

12 July 1992 Semi-final	Dublin	0–15 – 1–9	Louth	Croke Park, Dublin
	C Redmond 0–6, J Sheedy 0–2, D Farrell 0–2, V Murphy 0–2, M Galvin 0–2, E Heery 0–1.		C Kelly 0–5, S White 1–1, S O'Hanlon 0–2, J Osborne 0–1.	Attendance: 37,174; Referee: T McDermott (Cavan)

Final

26 July 1992 Final	Dublin	1–13 – 0–10	Kildare	Croke Park, Dublin
	C Redmond 0–5, K Barr 1–0, V Murphy 0–3, E Heery 0–1, P Clarke 0–1, P Curran 0–1, M Galvin 0–1, D Farrell 0–1.		N Buckley 0–4, P McLoughlin 0–2, M Lynch 0–2, B Fahy 0–1, J McDonald 0–1.	Attendance: 60,271; Referee: B White (Wexford)

=== Munster Senior Football Championship ===
Quarter-finals

17 May 1992 Quarter-final	Tipperary	2–13 – 0–13	Waterford	Ned Hall Park, Clonmel
	P Lambert 2–4, F Kelly 0–4, D Quirke 0–2, M Sheehan 0–1, A Cross 0–1, D Foley 0–1.		J Maher 0–6, L Dalton 0–2, D Kiely 0–2, G Walsh 0–2, J Murray 0–1.	Referee: M. O'Sullivan (Kerry)

24 May 1992 Quarter-final	Cork	0–10 – 2–14	Kerry	Páirc Uí Chaoimh, Cork
	J Kavanagh 0–5, S Fahy 0–2, T McCarthy 0–1, N Cahalane 0–1, M Slocum 0–1.		M Fitzgerald 1–8, B O'Shea 1–0, E Breen 0–1, A O'Donovan 0–1, P Laide 0–1, J O'Shea 0–1, J Cronin 0–1, T Fleming 0–1.	Attendance: 43,516; Referee: P Russell (Tipperary)

Semi-finals

21 June 1992 Semi-final	Limerick	1–11 – 1–14	Kerry	Gaelic Grounds, Limerick
	C McGuinness 1–6, D Fitzgibbon 0–3, T Cummins 0–1, D Larkin 0–1.		M Fitzgerald 0–5, C O'Dwyer 0–4, J O'Shea 0–4, W O'Shea 1–0, P Laide 0–1.	Attendance: 17,608; Referee: P Lonergan (Tipperary)

21 June 1992 Semi-final	Clare	2–11 – 2–7	Tipperary	Gaelic Grounds, Limerick
	F McInerney 2–3, G Killeen 0–5, M Daly 0–2, M Flynn 0–1.		D Hogan 1–1, P Lambert 1–0, F Kelly 0–3, K Coonan 0–2, D Foley 0–1.	Attendance: 17,608; Referee: W O'Mahony (Limerick)

Final

19 July 1992 Final	Clare	2–10 – 0–12	Kerry	Gaelic Grounds, Limerick
	C Clancy 1–1, G Killeen 0–4, M Daly 1–0, P Conway 0–2, F McInerney 0–1, N Roche 0–1, T Morrissey 0–1.	Report	M Fitzgerald 0–7, C Murphy 0–1, T Fleming 0–1, N O'Mahony 0–1, J O'Shea 0–1, B O'Shea 0–1.	Attendance: 24,015; Referee: P Russell (Tipperary)

=== Ulster Senior Football Championship ===
Preliminary round

17 May 1992 Preliminary round	Derry	1–10 – 1–7	Tyrone	Celtic Park, Derry
	J Heaney 1–1, E Gormely 0–4, A Tohill 0–2, S Downey 0–1, F McCusker 0–1, J McGurk 0–1.		G Coleman 1–0 og, E McCaffrey 0–3, P Canavan 0–3, A Cush 0–1.	Referee: T McDermott (Cavan)

Quarter-finals

24 May 1992 Quarter-final	Cavan	1–15 – 1–15	Donegal	Breffni Park, Cavan
	F Cahill 1–4, R Carolan 0–5, D O'Reilly 0–3, S King 0–1, M Fagan 0–1, V Dowd 0–1.		T Boyle 1–3, M McHugh 0–5, T Ryan 0–3, J McMullan 0–2, B Cunningham 0–1, N Hegarty 0–1.	Attendance: 15,000; Referee: J Curran (County Tyrone)

31 May 1992 Quarter-final replay	Donegal	0–20 – 1–6	Cavan	MacCumhaill Park, Ballybofey
	D Bonner 0–6, M Boyle 0–3, J McHugh 0–3, T Ryan 0–2, A Molloy 0–2, B Murray 0–1, C Mulgrew 0–1, B Cunningham 0–1, M McHugh 0–1.		D O'Reilly 1–0, R Carolan 0–3, B McArdle 0–1, J Brady 0–1, T Sheridan 0–1.	Attendance: 15,000; Referee: J Curran (County Tyrone)

31 May 1992 Quarter-final	Fermanagh	1–9 – 1–8	Antrim	St. Molaise Park, Irvinestown
	D Corrigan 1–2, P Coyle 0–3, M O'Rourke 0–2, C Curran 0–1, J Rehill 0–1.		J Kennedy 0–4, S Mulvenna 1–0, C O'Neill 0–3, A Donnelly 0–1.	Referee: M McGrath (Donegal)

7 June 1992 Quarter-final	Armagh	0–9 – 1–12	Down	Athletic Grounds, Armagh
	B McCabe 0–4, K McGurk 0–2, G O'Neill 0–1, G Houlihan 0–1, C O'Rourke 0–1.		G Mason 0–8, J McCartan 1–0, P Withnell 0–2, G Blaney 0–1, M Linden 0–1.	Referee: D Campbell (Fermanagh)

14 June 1992 Quarter-final	Monaghan	3–8 – 1–14	Derry	St. Mary's Park, Castleblayney
	R McCarron 1–5, K Hughes 1–1, S McGinnity 1–1, G Moen 0–1.		E Gormely 0–5, A Tohill 0–5, D Bateson 1–0, S Downey 0–2, F McCusker 0–1, H Downey 0–1.	Referee: G McGlory (Antrim)

21 June 1992 Quarter-final replay	Monaghan	0–7 – 2–9	Derry	St. Mary's Park, Castleblayney
	R McCarron 0–4, K Hughes 0–2, E Murphy 0–1.		D Bateson 1–1, E Gormley 0–4, G Coleman 1–0, A Tohill 0–2, S Downey 0–1, D Cassidy 0–1.	Referee: G McClorey (Antrim)

Semi-finals

21 June 1992 Semi-final	Donegal	2–17 – 0–7	Fermanagh	Healy Park, Omagh
	T Ryan 1–3, J McHugh 1–1, B Murray 0–2, J McMullan 0–2, D Bonner 0–2, T Boyle 0–2, M McHugh 0–2, M Boyle 0–1, M Gallagher 0–1, B McGowan 0–1.		P Coyle 0–3, M O'Rourke 0–1, M Gallagher 0–1, D Corrigan 0–1, S Bradley 0–1.	Referee: M Cranny (Down)

28 June 1992 Semi-final	Derry	0–15 – 0–12	Down	Casement Park, Belfast
	E Gormley 0–6, D Cassidy 0–3, A Tohill 0–3, G Coleman 0–1, B McGilligan 0–1, D Bateson 0–1.		G Mason 0–6, R carr 0–3, M Linden 0–1, C Mason 0–1, J McCartan 0–1.	Referee: M Greenan (Cavan)

Final

19 July 1992 Final	Donegal	0–14 – 1–9	Derry	St. Tiernach's Park, Clones
	M McHugh 0–4, D Bonner 0–3, J McHugh 0–3, T Ryan 0–2, T Boyle 0–1, D Reid 0–1.		S Downey 1–0, E Gormley 0–6, D McNicholl 0–1, A Tohill 0–1, D Barton 0–1.	Referee: J Curran (County Tyrone)

=== All-Ireland Senior Football Championship ===
Semi-finals

16 August 1992 Semi-final	Donegal	0–13 – 0–9	Mayo	Croke Park, Dublin
	D Bonner 0–4, M Boyle 0–3, J McHugh 0–2, T Boyle 0–2, B Murray 0–1, M McHugh 0–1.		J Jennings 0–4, R Dempsey 0–2, A Finnerty 0–1, L McHale 0–1, S Maher 0–1.	Referee: T Sugrue (Kerry)

23 August 1992 Semi-final	Dublin	3–14 – 2–12	Clare	Croke Park, Dublin
	V Murphy 2–1, C Redmond 0–5, M Galvin 1–1, P Clarke 0–2, J Sheedy 0–2, P Curran 0–1, N Guiden 0–1, D Farrell 0–1.	Report	G Killeen 1–3, P Conway 1–2, F McInerney 0–2, M Daly 0–1, M Roughan 0–1, T Morrissey 0–1, JJ Rouine 0–1, M Flynn 0–1.	Referee: T McDermott (Cavan)

Final

20 September 1992 Final	Donegal	0–18 – 0–14	Dublin	Croke Park, Dublin
	M Boyle 0–9, D Bonner 0–4, M McHugh 0–3, J McHugh 0–1, T Boyle 0–1.		C Redmond 0–3, P Clarke 0–2, M Galvin 0–2, V Murphy 0–2, J Sheedy 0–2, E Heery 0–1, N Guiden 0–1, D Farrell 0–1.	Attendance: 64,547; Referee: T Sugrue (Kerry)

== Championship statistics ==
=== Scoring ===
Overall

Rank	Player	County	Tally	Total	Matches	Average
1	Charlie Redmond	Dublin	1–28	31	6	5.16
2	Enda Gormley	Derry	0–25	25	5	5.00
3	Maurice Fitzgerald	Kerry	1–20	23	3	7.66
4	Vinnie Murphy	Dublin	3–11	20	6	3.33
5	Ray Dempsey	Mayo	1–17	20	5	4.00
6	Brian Breen	Leitrim	2–13	19	2	9.50
7	Declan Bonner	Donegal	0–19	19	6	3.16
8	Niall Buckley	Kildare	0–18	18	3	6.00
9	Martin McHugh	Donegal	0–16	16	6	2.66
10	Gerry Killeen	Clare	1–12	15	3	5.00

Single game

Rank	Player	County	Tally	Total	Opposition
1	Brian Breen	Leitrim	2–7	13	London
2	Maurice Fitzgerald	Kerry	1–8	11	Cork
3	Peter Lambert	Tipperary	2–4	10	Waterford
3	Derek Duggan	Roscommon	1–7	10	Leitrim
5	Francis McInerney	Clare	2–3	9	Tipperary
5	Chris McGuinness	Limerick	1–6	9	Kerry
5	Manus Boyle	Donegal	0–9	9	Dublin
8	Fergal O'Neill	Galway	1–5	8	Mayo
8	Larry Giles	Westmeath	1–5	8	Carlow
8	Ray McCarron	Monaghan	1–5	8	Derry
8	Ray Dempsey	Mayo	0–8	8	Galway
8	Pat Baker	Wicklow	0–8	8	Longford
8	Gary Mason	Down	0–8	8	Armagh

=== Miscellaneous ===
- Kildare play Westmeath meet in the Leinster championship for the first time since 1975.
- Clare won the Munster final for the first time since 1917.
- Donegal win the All Ireland final for the first time. The first new county since Offaly in 1971 to win the title for first time. There were a number of first-time championship meetings. The complete All Ireland Series from the Semi-finals of Donegal vs Mayo, Dublin vs Clare and the final between Donegal and Dublin were all the first championship meetings of the teams.
