= 2014 Donegal county football team season =

Donegal county football team
2014 season
- Manager: Jim McGuinness
- Stadium: MacCumhaill Park, Ballybofey
- All-Ireland SFC: Finalist
- Ulster SFC: Winners

The following is a summary of Donegal county football team's 2014 season.

The 2014 Donegal county football team season was the franchise's 110th season since the County Board's foundation in 1905. The team entered the season looking to improve on their poor 2013 run and return to prominence for the first time since winning Sam Maguire MMXII.

Jim McGuinness returned for his fourth season as the team's manager. Pioneer of the game's revolutionary tactic The System, he entered the season with two Ulster titles (2011, 2012), and added a third this season, before becoming the first manager in team history to lead his team to two All-Ireland Finals.

== Personnel changes ==
Manager Jim McGuinness installed a new backroom team, consisting of Damian Diver, Paul McGonigle and John Duffy.

Ryan Bradley and Ross Wherity both emigrated after the 2013 season.

Ciaran Bonner and Leon Thompson returned to the panel for the first time since 2009. Christy Toye returned after missing the 2013 season due to illness. Returning also were Tommy McKinley (Naomh Colmcille) and Antoin McFadden — both excluded in the early part of the 2013 season after featuring as part of the 2012 panel. Conor Classon returned to the panel as well.

Hugh McFadden joined the panel after manager McGuinness noticed him during the 2013 Donegal Senior Football Championship. Also joining were Stephen McLaughlin (Malin) and Darach O'Connor.

== Panel ==
Team as per Donegal v Dublin, 2014 All-Ireland Semi Final, 31 August 2014

No.	Player	Position	Club
1	Paul Durcan	Goalkeeper	The Four Masters
2	Eamon McGee	Right corner back	Gaoth Dobhair
3	Neil McGee	Full back	Gaoth Dobhair
4	Paddy McGrath	Left corner back	Ard an Rátha
5	Anthony Thompson	Right half back	Naomh Conaill
6	Karl Lacey	Centre back	The Four Masters
7	Frank McGlynn	Left half back	Glenfin
8	Neil Gallagher	Midfield	Glenswilly
9	Odhrán Mac Niallais	Midfield	Gaoth Dobhair
10	Christy Toye	Right half forward	St Michael's
11	Leo McLoone	Centre forward	Naomh Conaill
12	Ryan McHugh	Left half forward	Cill Chartha
13	Patrick McBrearty	Right corner forward	Cill Chartha
14	Michael Murphy (c)	Full forward	Glenswilly
15	Colm McFadden	Left corner forward	St Michael's

No.	Player	Position	Club
16	Michael Boyle	Substitute	Termon
17	Darach O'Connor	Substitute	Buncrana
18	David Walsh	Substitute	Naomh Bríd
19	Declan Walsh	Substitute	Malin
20	Dermot Molloy	Substitute	Naomh Conaill
21	Hugh McFadden	Substitute	Na Cealla Beaga
22	Leon Thompson	Substitute	Naomh Conaill
23	Luke Keaney	Substitute	The Four Masters
24	Martin McElhinney	Substitute	St Michael's
25	Martin O'Reilly	Substitute	Seán MacCumhaill's
26	Rory Kavanagh	Substitute	St Eunan's

== Competitions ==
=== National Football League Division 2 ===
Donegal won promotion from Division 2.

2014 Division 2 table

Team	Pld	W	D	L	F	A	Diff	Pts	Notes
Donegal	7	5	1	1	9-97	7-67	+36	11	Advanced to final and promoted to Division 1 for 2015
Monaghan	7	5	1	1	3-107	3-78	+29	11	Advanced to final and promoted to Division 1 for 2015
Meath	7	4	1	2	9-87	8-95	–5	9

Round 1

Laois	1-9 – 2-19	Donegal

Round 2

Galway	0-12 – 1-16	Donegal

Round 3

Donegal	2-11 – 0-10	Monaghan

Round 4

Donegal	1-12 – 1-12	Meath

Round 5

Down	1-9 – 0-10	Donegal

Round 6

Donegal	1-19 – 3-7	Louth

Round 7

Armagh	1-8 – 2-10	Donegal

27 April 2014
2:00 pm
Final

Monaghan	1-16 – 1-10	Donegal
K Hughes 1-1, P Finlay (1f), C McManus 0-3 each, P McKenna, D Hughes 0-2 each, R Beggan ('45), D Mone, D Clerkin, C McGuinness, F Kelly 0-1 each	Report	M Murphy 1-4 (1 pen, 3f), C McFadden 0-4 (3f), P McBrearty, O MacNiallais 0-1 each

Croke Park, Dublin
Attendance: 38,841
Referee: David Gough (Meath)

=== Ulster Senior Football Championship ===
Donegal won the Ulster Championship for a third time in four seasons.

Preliminary round
Tyrone (R)	2-11; 3-11
Down (R)	3-08; 0-12

Quarter-finals
Tyrone	0-14
Monaghan	1-12
Armagh	1-12
Cavan	0-09
Fermanagh	3-13
Antrim	2-18
Derry	0-11
Donegal	1-11

Semi-finals
Monaghan (R)	0-14; 1-18
Armagh (R)	0-14; 1-13
Antrim	0-12
Donegal	3-16

Final
Monaghan	1-09
Donegal	0-15

25 May 2014
2.00pm
Quarter-final

Derry	0-11 – 1-11	Donegal
M Lynch (0-04), E Bradley (0-03), B Heron (0-02), C McFaul, N Holly (0-01 each)	Report	L McLoone (1-01), M Murphy (0-04), K Lacey, A Thompson, C Toye, D O'Connor, P McBrearty, M McElhinney (0-01 each)

Celtic Park, Derry
Attendance: 15,883
Referee: Joe McQuillan (Cavan)
22 June 2014
2.00pm
Semi-final

Donegal	3-16 – 0-12	Antrim
D O'Connor, L McLoone (1-02 each), D Molloy (1-01), O MacNialais (0-04), M Murphy (0-03), C Toye, C McFadden (0-02 each)	Report	T McCann, B Neeson (0-03 each), M Sweeney (0-02), C Murray, P McCann, K Niblock, P Cunningham (0-01 each)

St Tiernach's Park
Attendance: 11,795
Referee: Barry Cassidy (Derry)
20 July 2014
4.00pm
Final

Monaghan	1-09 – 0-15	Donegal
P Finlay (0-04), C McGuinness (1-00), R Beggan (0-02), V Corey, K Hughes, C McManus (0-01 each)	Report	C McFadden (0-04), P McBrearty, O MacNiallais (0-03 each), M Murphy (0-02), A Thompson, K Lacey, R McHugh (0-01 each)

St Tiernach's Park, Clones
Referee: Maurice Deegan (Laois)

=== All-Ireland Senior Football Championship ===
Donegal reached the All-Ireland Final for the second time in three seasons.

9 August 2014
4.00pm
Quarter-final B

Donegal	1-12 – 1-11	Armagh
M Murphy (0-05), O MacNiallais (1-01), C McFadden (0-03), P McBrearty (0-02), N McGee (0-01)	Report	T Kernan (0-04), A Kernan (0-02), A Mallon, A Forker, S Campbell, K Carragher, M Murray (0-01 each); P Durcan (1-00 own goal)

Croke Park, Dublin
Attendance: 72,440
Referee: Joe McQuillan (Cavan)
31 August 2014
3:30pm
Semi-final

Donegal	3-14 - 0-17	Dublin
R McHugh 2-02, C McFadden 1-03 (2fs), M Murphy 0-03 (2fs), P McBrearty 0-02, K Lacey, F McGlynn, O MacNiallais, R Kavanagh 0-01 each	Report	D Connolly 0-05 (1f), P Flynn 0-04, B Brogan 0-03 (1f), A Brogan, P Andrews 0-02 each, P McMahon 0-01

Croke Park, Dublin
Attendance: 81,500
Referee: Joe McQuillan (Cavan)
21 September 2014
Final

Donegal	v	Kerry

Croke Park, Dublin
Referee: Eddie Kinsella (Laois)

== Management team ==
- Manager: Jim McGuinness
- Selectors: Damian Diver, John Duffy, Paul McGonigle
- Goalkeeping coach: Pat Shovelin
- Strength and conditioning coach: Paul Fisher

== Awards ==
=== GAA.ie Football Team of the Week ===
Included:

- 21 July: Ryan McHugh, Karl Lacey, Odhrán Mac Niallais, Patrick McBrearty

=== The Sunday Game Team of the Year ===
The Sunday Game selected Paul Durcan, Neil McGee, Neil Gallagher, Ryan McHugh and Michael Murphy on its Team of the Year.

=== GAA/GPA Young Footballer of the Year ===
Ryan McHugh won.

=== All Stars ===
Donegal achieved four All Stars.

Pos.	Player	Team	Appearances
GK	Paul Durcan	Donegal	2
RCB	Paul Murphy	Kerry	1
FB	Neil McGee	Donegal	3
LCB	Keith Higgins	Mayo	3
RWB	James McCarthy	Dublin	1
CB	Peter Crowley	Kerry	1
LWB	Colm Boyle	Mayo	2
MD	Neil Gallagher	Donegal	2
MD	David Moran	Kerry	1
RWF	Paul Flynn	Dublin	4
CF	Michael Murphy	Donegal	2
LWF	Diarmuid Connolly	Dublin	1
RCF	Cillian O'Connor	Mayo	1
FF	Kieran Donaghy	Kerry	3
LCF	James O'Donoghue^{FOTY}	Kerry	2

County breakdown

- Kerry= 5
- Donegal= 4
- Dublin= 3
- Mayo= 3

== Notes ==
A team managed by Declan Bonner, and including Eoghan Bán Gallagher, Jamie Brennan, John Campbell, Michael Carroll, Lorcan Connor, Ciaran Diver, Kieran Gillespie, Stephen McBrearty, Andrew McClean, Tony McClenaghan, Caolan McGonagle, Stephen McMenamin, Cian Mulligan and Ethan O'Donnell, advanced to the 2014 All-Ireland Minor Football Championship final on 21 September.
