= 2020 Donegal county football team season =

Donegal county football team
2020 season
- Manager: Declan Bonner
- Stadium: MacCumhaill Park, Ballybofey
- NFL D1: 5th
- All-Ireland SFC: Did not compete
- Ulster SFC: Finalist
- Dr McKenna Cup: Semi-finalist (walkover)

The following is a summary of Donegal county football team's 2020 season. The season was suspended in March 2020 due to the COVID-19 pandemic. The season resumed in mid-October of the same year.

Eight players completed the league and championship season while awaiting the outcome of the 2020 Donegal Senior Football Championship final (postponed following a case of COVID-19 at the Kilcar club); these were Patrick McBrearty, Ryan McHugh, Eoin McHugh and Andrew McClean, as well as the following from their opponents Naomh Conaill: Ciarán Thompson, Jeaic Mac Ceallabhuí, Eoghan McGettigan and Ethan O'Donnell.

== Squad ==
1 S. Patton
2 E. B. Gallagher
3 N. McGee
4 E. McHugh
5 R. McHugh
6 P. Brennan
7 P. Mogan
8 H. McFadden
9 C. McGonagle
23 B. McCole
11 N. O'Donnell
12 M. Langan
13 P. McBrearty
14 M. Murphy (c.)
15 J. Brennan
Subs
20 A. McClean for P. Brennan
21 D. Ó Baoill for E. McHugh
10 C. Thompson for McBrearty
19 J. McGee for O'Donnell
Subs not used
16 M. Lynch
17 J. Mac Ceallabhuí
18 E. McGettigan
22 C. Ward
24 E. Doherty
25 C. O'Donnell
26 P. McGrath
Other panel members
? S. McMenamin
? M. Carroll
? C. Diver
? K. Gillespie
? A. Doherty

Manager
D. Bonner
Selectors
P. McGonigle
G. Boyle
S. Rochford

Above is the starting lineup vs Cavan on 22 November 2020

Others
Conor Morrison
Ethan O'Donnell

== Personnel changes ==
Players added to the panel included Ethan O'Donnell, Jeaic Mac Ceallabhuí, Andrew McClean, Conor O'Donnell, Ciaran Diver, Enda McCormick, Aaron Deeney (St Eunan's) and Brian O'Donnell.

Cian Mulligan joined the panel again after departing the previous season. Conor Morrison, who played six games in the 2019 season before deciding to depart in March, returned.

Michael Carroll was recalled after his midfield performances in the 2019 Donegal SFC. Tony McClenaghan also returned, following his injury.

Frank McGlynn retired ahead of the 2020 season.

Odhrán Mac Niallais did not return, having previously opted out of the 2019 season.

== Competitions ==
=== Dr McKenna Cup ===
Jason McGee had hip surgery in Coventry, England, on 28 November 2019, causing him to miss the opening part of the season.

Eamonn Doherty, Hugh McFadden and Odhrán McFadden-Ferry were all struck down by "January flu" as the season opened.

=== National Football League Division 1 ===
Donegal competed in Division 1 for the 2020 National League season. The GAA published the fixture schedule on 26 November 2019. On 12 March 2020, the GAA suspended the National League in mid-March due to the COVID-19 pandemic. Games resumed in October 2020. The footballers travelled the round-trip of 900 kilometres to Tralee in their own cars to play Kerry in the first game, a feat described in the Irish Independent as the "most eye-catching example of GAA expeditions in the Covid era".

==== Table ====
Pos	Team	Pld	W	D	L	PF	PA	PD	Pts	Qualification
1	Kerry (C)	7	5	1	1	133	112	+21	11	National Football League champions
2	Dublin	7	4	2	1	126	112	+14	10	
3	Galway	7	4	0	3	128	127	+1	8 (Note: Head-to-head result: Galway 2-25 – 0-12 Tyrone.)	
4	Tyrone	7	4	0	3	109	126	−17	8	
5	Donegal	7	3	1	3	117	109	+8	7	
6	Monaghan	7	2	2	3	113	114	−1	6	
7	Mayo (R)	7	2	1	4	122	123	−1	5	Relegation to 2021 NFL Division 2
8	Meath (R)	7	0	1	6	103	128	−25	1	Relegation to 2021 NFL Division 2

Updated to match(es) played on 24 October 2020. Source: GAA.ie
Rules for classification: 1) League points 2) Where only two teams are involved, the outcome of the meeting of the two teams in the competition 3) Scoring Difference 4) Highest Total Score For 5) A Play-Off.
(C) League champions; (R) Relegated

==== Fixtures ====
25 January 2020 1	Donegal	0-19 (19) – (19) 2-13	Mayo	Ballybofey
19:15 GMT (UTC+0)				Venue: MacCumhaill Park
		Report		Referee: David Coldrick (Meath)

2 February 2020 2	Meath	0-07 (07) – (17) 3-08	Donegal	Navan
15:30 GMT (UTC+0)				Venue: Páirc Tailteann
		Report		Referee: Conor Lane (Cork)

9 February 2020 3	Donegal	2-07 (13) – (14) 2-08	Galway	Letterkenny
15:00 GMT (UTC+0)				Venue: O'Donnell Park
		Report		Referee: Joe McQuillan (Cavan)

22 February 2020 4	Dublin	1-15 (18) – (17) 1-14	Donegal	Drumcondra, Dublin
19:00 GMT (UTC+0)				Venue: Croke Park
		Report		Referee: Maurice Deegan (Laois)

1 March 2020 5	Donegal	2-12 (18) – (08) 0-08	Monaghan	Ballyshannon
14:00 GMT (UTC+0)				Venue: Fr Tierney Park
		Report		Referee: David Coldrick (Meath)

18 October 2020 6	Donegal	2-17 (23) – (19) 2-13	Tyrone	Ballybofey
16:00 IST (UTC+1)				Venue: MacCumhaill Park
		Report		Referee: Jerome Henry (Mayo); TV: TG4

24 October 2020 7	Kerry	2-18 (24) – (10) 0-10	Donegal	Tralee
14:00 IST (UTC+1)				Venue: Austin Stack Park
		Report		Referee: Conor Lane (Cork); TV: eir Sport

=== Ulster Senior Football Championship ===
The draw for the 2020 Ulster SFC took place on RTÉ Radio 1 on the morning of 9 October 2019.

Paddy McGrath sustained an injury during training ahead of the 2020 Ulster SFC semi-final, which ruled him out.

Ciarán Thompson and Oisín Gallen sustained injuries during training ahead of the 2020 Ulster SFC final; Thompson could only make a substitute appearance in the game and Gallen could not play at all.

==== Bracket ====
Preliminary round
Monaghan	1–17
Cavan	2–15

Quarter-finals
Donegal	1–13
Tyrone	1–11
Derry	0–15
Armagh	0–17
Fermanagh	0–11
Down	1–15
Antrim	0–9
Cavan	0–13

Semi-finals
Donegal	1–22
Armagh	0–13
Down	1–13
Cavan	1–14

Final
Donegal	0–12
Cavan	1–13

==== Fixtures ====
RTÉ, BBC NI

1 November 2020
13:30 GMT (UTC+0)
Quarter-final

Report

Donegal	1-13 (16) – (14) 1-11	Tyrone
(HT: 1-5 – 0-6)
Gls: M Langan 1. Pts: C Thompson 7 (5fs), M Langan 2, J Brennan 2, O Gallen 1, P Brennan 1.		Gls: D Canavan 1. Pts: D McCurry 3 (1f), M Bradley 2, M Donnelly 1, C McKenna 1 (f), P Harte 1, F Burns 1, N Morgan 1 (45), D Canavan 1.

MacCumhaill Park, Ballybofey
Referee: Joe McQuillan (Cavan)
Attendance: 0 (Note: The game was played behind closed doors due to the impact of the COVID-19 pandemic on Gaelic games.)

Sky Sports Mix

14 November 2020
13:15 GMT (UTC+0)
Semi-final

Report

Donegal	1-22 (25) – (13) 0-13	Armagh
(HT: 1-12 – 0-3)
Gls: P Mogan 1. Pts: M Langan 3, P Mogan 2, R McHugh 2, J Brennan 2, C McGonigle 2 (1m), C Thompson 2 (1f), N O’Donnell 2 (1m), M Murphy 2 (2f), EB Gallagher 1, H McFadden 1 (m), P McBrearty 1, O Gallen 1, A McClean 1		Pts: R O’Neill 7 (6f, 1x’45′), J Clarke 2, C Turbitt 2 (1m), O O’Neil 1, N Grimley 1 (1m).

Breffni Park, Cavan
Referee: David Coldrick (Meath)
Attendance: 0

RTÉ
BBC NI

22 November 2020
16:00 GMT (UTC+0)

Report

Donegal	0-12 (12) – (16) 1-13	Cavan
(HT: 0-9 - 0-7)
Pts: P McBrearty 4 (2f), N O’Donnell 2, C McGonigle 2, R McHugh 1, P Mogan 1, M Langan 1, M Murphy 1.		Gls: C Madden 1. Pts: C Madden 2, J Smith 2, O Kiernan 2, G McKiernan 2 (2f), J McLoughlin 1, G Smith 1, C Brady 1, T Galligan 1, M Reilly 1.

Athletic Grounds, Armagh
Referee: Barry Cassidy (Derry)
Attendance: 0

=== All-Ireland Senior Football Championship ===
Due to the impact of the COVID-19 pandemic on Gaelic games, the GAA announced that there would be no back-door route into the All-Ireland Championship. Therefore, because Donegal did not win the Ulster Championship, they did not qualify for the 2020 All-Ireland Championship.

== Management team ==
Confirmed in November 2017, with replacements noted:

- Manager: Declan Bonner
- Assistant manager: Paul McGonigle, not listed among November 2017 appointments
- Head coach: John McElholm
- Coach: Gary Boyle
- Selector: Stephen Rochford, replacing Karl Lacey after 2018 season but Lacey actually carried on until the end of 2020
- Goalkeeping coach: Andrew McGovern
- Strength and conditioning coach: Paul Fisher
- Nutritionist: Ronan Doherty
- Team physician: Kevin Moran
- Physio: Cathal Ellis
- Psychology and performance manager: Anthony McGrath, previously involved with the minor team
- Video analysis: Chris Byrne
- Logistics: Packie McDyre
- Kitman: Barry McBride

== Awards ==
=== GAA.ie Football Team of the Week ===
- 27 January: Eoghan Bán Gallagher, Michael Murphy; Murphy nominated for Footballer of the Week
- 3 February: Michael Langan, Jamie Brennan
- 19 October: Ryan McHugh, Jamie Brennan; McHugh nominated for Footballer of the Week
- Langan nominated for, and selected as, Player of the Week
- 16 November: Shaun Patton, Peadar Mogan, Michael Langan; Mogan nominated for Footballer of the Week

=== All Stars ===
Three nominations, for Peadar Mogan, Michael Langan and Ciarán Thompson
