= 2022 Donegal county football team season =

Donegal county football team
2022 season
- Manager: Declan Bonner
- Stadium: MacCumhaill Park, Ballybofey
- NFL D1: 4th
- All-Ireland SFC: Round 2 qualifier
- Ulster SFC: Finalist
- Dr McKenna Cup: Finalist

The following is a summary of Donegal county football team's 2022 season.

== Personnel changes ==
Declan Bonner had been reappointed for another two-year term as manager at the end of August 2021, when no other candidates emerged to succeed him.

Paddy Campbell joined the management team. Also joining the management team were Dr Ciarán Kearney and — as strength and conditioning coach — Mattie Brady. Part of the responsibility of Brady — originally from Clonoe, County Tyrone — was to work with players arriving into the senior squad from underage teams.

Paddy McGrath, who won the Sam Maguire Cup in the 2012 season, announced his retirement from inter-county football ahead of the 2022 season. Odhrán Mac Niallais also opted to depart.

== Kit ==
A new kit was launched, featuring a "shadow print" naming each of the county's clubs. Players shirts began to feature "Circet" on the front, as the "KN Group" rebranded. Sleeve sponsors were POD-TRAK and Global Hydrate, with Abbey Hotel on the back of the player shirts.

== Squad ==
List of players

Neil McGee remained injured ahead of the season, following the 2021 Ulster Senior Football Championship semi-final against Tyrone. He would retire at the end of the year.

Oisín Gallen appeared as a substitute in the 2022 National Football League fixture against Tyrone but then sustained an injury, missing the 2022 Ulster Senior Football Championship, including the final.

== Competitions ==
=== Dr McKenna Cup ===
The group draw took place on 15 December 2021. Donegal won three games from four and advanced as far as the final.

Nine players made their senior debut in this competition, though only three — Odhrán Doherty, Charles McGuinness and Shane O'Donnell — played in each of the four games. McGuinness and O'Donnell made their debuts against Down, while the other seven (Caolan McColgan, Odhrán Doherty, Jamie Grant, Rory O'Donnell, Mark Curran, Aaron Doherty and Ryan McFadden) made their debuts against Antrim.

Pos	Team	Pld	W	D	L	PF	PA	PR	Pts	Qualification
1	Donegal	2	2	0	0	31	26	1.192	4	Advance to semi-final
2	Antrim	2	1	0	1	27	28	0.964	2	
3	Down	2	0	0	2	27	31	0.871	0	

Updated to match(es) played on 15 January 2022. Source: Ulster GAA

==== Fixtures ====
7 January 2022 Round 1	Donegal	1–13 (16) – (14) 2–08	Down	Ballybofey
19:30 GMT (UTC)				Venue: MacCumhaill Park
		Report		Referee: Sean Hurson (Tyrone)

15 January 2022 Round 3	Antrim	1–09 (12) – (15) 0–15	Donegal	Portglenone
13:30 GMT (UTC)				Venue: Kelly Park
		Report		Referee: Niall McKenna (Monaghan)

BEOSPORT

18 January 2022
19:45 GMT (UTC)
Semi-Final 2

Report

Donegal	2–09 (15) – (11) 0–11	Derry
(HT: 2–05 — 0–06)

MacCumhaill Park, Ballybofey
Referee: Sean Laverty (Antrim)

TG4

22 January 2022
17:00 GMT (UTC)
Final

Report

Monaghan	1–11 (14) – (13) 0–13	Donegal
(HT: 1–07 — 0–04)

Healy Park, Omagh
Referee: K Brady (Louth)

=== National Football League Division 1 ===
The team for the fixture against Kerry was the same as the one given in the matchday programme.

Injuries were a problem ahead of the Tyrone game; Michael Langan, Jamie Brennan and team captain Michael Murphy were all still injured, while Caolan McGonagle had sustained a hand injury thought to have ruled him out of the rest of the competition, and then there was Tony McClenaghan also now injured as well.

Ahead of the final round of fixtures (and Donegal's game against Armagh), injuries ruled out Oisín Gallen, Langan, McGonagle, Niall O'Donnell and Ciarán Thompson.

League appearances by other new players included: Eunan Doherty made a substitute appearance against Mayo.

Shane O'Donnell and Mark Curran made substitute appearances against Kildare.

Shane McDonnell (O'Donnell?) and Rory O'Donnell started against Kerry.

Shane O'Donnell started against Tyrone.

Eunan Doherty made a substitute appearance against Monaghan.

Shane O'Donnell made a substitute appearance against Dublin.

Shane O'Donnell started against Armagh.

==== Table ====
Pos	Team	Pld	W	D	L	PF	PA	PD	Pts	Qualification
1	Kerry	7	5	1	1	118	91	+27	11	Advance to National League Final
2	Mayo	7	4	1	2	108	94	+14	9	Advance to National League Final
3	Armagh	7	3	1	3	108	98	+10	7	
4	Donegal	7	3	1	3	95	103	−8	7	
5	Tyrone	7	3	1	3	85	96	−11	7	
6	Monaghan	7	2	2	3	100	113	−13	6	
7	Kildare	7	2	1	4	104	111	−7	5	Relegation to 2023 NFL Division 2
8	Dublin	7	2	0	5	106	118	−12	4	Relegation to 2023 NFL Division 2

Updated to match(es) played on 27 March 2022. Source: GAA.ie
Rules for classification: Tiebreakers

==== Fixtures ====
30 January 2022 Round 1	Mayo	0–11 (11) – (11) 0–11	Donegal	Sligo
13:45 GMT (UTC+0)				Venue: Markievicz Park
		Report		Referee: N Mooney (Cavan); Attendance: 9,000

6 February 2022 Round 2	Donegal	2–11 (17) – (12) 1–09	Kildare	Ballybofey
14:30 GMT (UTC+0)				Venue: MacCumhaill Park
		Report		Referee: Barry Cassidy (Derry)

20 February 2022 Round 3	Kerry	1–13 (16) – (7) 0–07	Donegal	Killarney
13:45 GMT (UTC+0)				Venue: Fitzgerald Stadium
		Report		Referee: Maurice Deegan (Laois)

26 February 2022 Round 4	Donegal	2–10 (16) – (12) 0–12	Tyrone	Ballybofey
19:30 GMT (UTC+0)				Venue: MacCumhaill Park
		Report		Referee: Brendan Cawley (Kildare)

13 March 2022 Round 5	Donegal	0–10 (10) – (15) 1–12	Monaghan	Ballybofey
13:45 GMT (UTC+0)				Venue: MacCumhaill Park
		Report		Referee: Martin Hurson (Tyrone)

20 March 2022 Round 6	Dublin	2–15 (21) – (17) 2–11	Donegal	Drumcondra, Dublin
15:45 GMT (UTC+0)				Venue: Croke Park
		Report

27 March 2022 Round 7	Donegal	1–14 (17) – (16) 1–13	Armagh	Letterkenny
13:45 IST (UTC+1)				Venue: O'Donnell Park
		Report		Attendance: 5,650

=== Ulster Senior Football Championship ===
The draw for the 2021 Ulster Championship was made on 28 November 2021.

Shane O'Donnell started and scored a point against Armagh. He also started against Cavan and Derry.

==== Bracket ====
Preliminary round 16 April
Fermanagh	2–10
Tyrone	2–17

Quarter-finals; 23/24/30 April, 1 May
Donegal	1–16
Armagh	0–12
Antrim	0–10
Cavan	1–20
Monaghan	0–23
Down	2–7
Tyrone	0–10
Derry	1–18

Semi-finals; 8/15 May
Donegal	2–16
Cavan	0–16
Derry	3–12
Monaghan	0–17

Final; 29 May
Donegal	1–14
Derry	1–16

==== Fixtures ====
24 April 2022
14:00
Quarter-final

Donegal	1–16 — 0–12	Armagh
Michael Murphy 0-6 (0-4f), Patrick McBrearty 1-2 (0-1f), Michael Langan 0-3, Shane O'Donnell, Ciaran Thompson, Jason McGee, Eoghan Ban Gallagher & Conor O'Donnell 0-1 each	Report	Rory Grugan 0-5 (0-3f), Tiernan Kelly, Conor Turbitt, Ben Crealey, Jarly-Óg Burns, Greg McCabe, Stefan Campbell & Oisin O'Neill 0-1 each

MacCumhaill Park, Ballybofey
Referee: Maurice Deegan (Laois)
8 May 2022
16:00
Semi-final

Cavan	0–16 — 2–16	Donegal
Paddy Lynch 0-6 (0-3f), Gearóid McKiernan (0-1f) & James Smith (0-1m) 0-3 each, Thomas Galligan 0-2, Gerard Smith & Raymond Galligan (0-1f) 0-1 each	Report	Paddy McBrearty 1-4 (0-3f), Michael Murphy 0-5 (0-4f), Jamie Brennan 0-4, Conor O'Donnell 1-0, Ciaran Thompson, Peader Mogan & Caolan McGonagle 0-1 each

St Tiernach's Park, Clones
Referee: Conor Lane (Cork)
29 May 2022
16:00
Final

Derry	1–16 — 1–14	Donegal
	Report

St Tiernach's Park, Clones
Referee: Sean Hurson (Tyrone)

=== All-Ireland Senior Football Championship ===
According to Armagh's coach Kieran Donaghy, it was the decision of the players to push up against Donegal goalkeeper Shaun Patton's kick-outs in the 2022 All-Ireland SFC qualifier win — a decision that brought them back into the game. Donaghy said: "The boys have to get all the credit really because it was going away from us. We got the electric start (with Rory Grugan's goal after 10 seconds) then conceded six points in a row, but the lads wanted to push up on Patton's kick-out. We were in the stage of 'do we try to hold on until half-time then push on' but Rory Grugan said 'no, we're going to push up on it'. I think those two turnovers, we got the free then the black card and the penalty, they were a huge momentum lift. But I thought our half-back line was really good. Greg (McCabe) and Jarly Og (Burns) got a few vital turnovers before half-time and put us going the other way."

Pauric McShea wrote, following the season-ending loss to Armagh: "If there was a technical report on Donegal 2022 it would possibly read 'Too cautious and not emerging from their passivity to have a crack'". McShea also wrote: "Dismay at Donegal's demise in the championship this year should be partially offset by the team's display in the first quarter of our game with Armagh last Sunday week. This was football of the highest order and real football people would understand that Michael Murphy's presence was a major factor in this show of attacking excellence."

Seeded	Unseeded
Donegal Kildare Limerick Roscommon	Cork Clare Mayo Armagh

12 June 2022 Round 2	Donegal	0–16 — 3–17	Armagh	St Tiernach's Park, Clones
	M Murphy (0–6, 0–5 frees), S O'Donnell (0–4), A Doherty, R McHugh, J McGee, C Thompson, P McBrearty, N O'Donnell (0–1 each)	Report	R O'Neill (1–7, 1–0 pen, 2 frees, 1x'45), R Grugan (1–3, 1 free), J Óg Burns (0–3), S Sheridan (1–0), C Turbitt (0–2), S Campbell, J Duffy (0–1 each)	Referee: Brendan Cawley (Kildare)

== Management team ==
Confirmed in November 2017, with replacements noted:

- Manager: Declan Bonner
- Assistant manager: Paul McGonigle, not listed among November 2017 appointments
- Paddy Campbell, joined ahead of the 2022 season
- Head coach: John McElholm
- Coach: Gary Boyle
- Selector: Stephen Rochford, replacing Karl Lacey after 2018 season but Lacey actually carried on until the end of 2020
- Goalkeeping coach: James Gallagher, after 2020 season replacing Andrew McGovern
- Strength and conditioning coach: Mattie Brady, from 2022 season, replacing Antoin McFadden, who after 2020 season, replaced Paul Fisher
- Nutritionist: Ronan Doherty
- Team physician: Kevin Moran
- Physio: Cathal Ellis
- Psychology and performance manager: Anthony McGrath, previously involved with the minor team
- Video analysis: Chris Byrne
- Logistics: Packie McDyre
- Kitman: Barry McBride
- Dr Ciarán Kearney, ahead of 2022 season

== Awards ==
=== GAA.ie Football Team of the Week ===
- 31 January: Michael Langan
- 7 February: Jason McGee, Ryan McHugh, Michael Langan
- 28 February: Conor O'Donnell (nominated for Footballer of the Week)
- 28 March: OMFF, Patrick McBrearty
- 25 April: Shaun Patton, Brendan McCole, Michael Langan, Michael Murphy (Murphy voted Footballer of the Week)
- 9 May: Shaun Patton, Stephen McMenamin, Eoghan Bán Gallagher, Jamie Brennan (Brennan nominated for Footballer of the Week)
- 30 May: Peadar Mogan

== Notes ==
Minor panel (Ulster Minor Football League)

Zach Conlon (Malin), J. P. McGuinness (Killybegs), Fiachra McClafferty (Downings), Donal Gallagher (Glenswilly), Gareth Gallagher (Termon), Danny Diver (Carndonagh), Jack Long (Glenfin), Oisín Scanlon (St Eunan's), Shaun McMenamin (MacCumhaill's), Sean Martin (MacCumhaill's), Eoghan Kelly (Aodh Ruadh), Niall Prendiville (St Naul's), Cian McGee (An Clochán Liath), Finbarr Roarty (Naomh Conaill), Shane Delahunty (Aodh Ruadh), Eoghan Scott (Glenswilly), Ben Rafferty (Kilcar), Cian McMenamin (Termon), Sean McLaughlin (Buncrana), Lorcan McGee (Cloughaneely), Conor McGinty (MacCumahill's), Odhran Doherty (Naomh Conaill), Mark McDevitt (Naomh Conaill), Max Roarty (St Michael's), Odhran O'Connor (Glenfin), Gavin Doherty (Killybegs), Karl Joseph Molloy (Ardara), Ryan Barrett (Bundoran), Kevin Lynch (Naomh Pádraig, Muff), Daithi Gildea (Glenswilly), Padraig Coyle (Cloughaneely), Senan Carr (Four Masters), Jack Hegarty (Naomh Ultan), Shane Callaghan (Naomh Columba). Manager: Luke Barrett (third season)
