= 2019 Donegal county football team season =

Donegal county football team
2019 season
- Manager: Declan Bonner
- Stadium: MacCumhaill Park, Ballybofey
- NFL D2: 2nd (promoted)
- All-Ireland SFC: Quarter-finalist
- Ulster SFC: Winners
- Dr McKenna Cup: Semi-finalist

The following is a summary of Donegal county football team's 2019 season.

Two players started all 18 matches in 2019: these were Jamie Brennan and Hugh McFadden. Niall O'Donnell played each match too, though only as a substitute in the championship meeting with Fermanagh. Paul Brennan only missed one of the eighteen games, though he began just five of these. Jason McGee played in all matches except for the 2019 National Football League fixture with Cork, which he missed due to suspension.

== Personnel changes ==
Oisín Gallen became an "impact sub" during the championship; this was despite him not being part of the Donegal panel at the start of the 2019 season. He was called up over the course of the McKenna Cup as Donegal were short on numbers.

Aaron Doherty began training with the panel in April, shortly after Eoghan McGettigan joined.

Cian Mulligan opted to depart from the panel. Conor Morrison played six games in the 2019 season before deciding to depart in March. In March, Martin McElhinney informed the team manager of his decision to withdraw from the panel, following the team's victory against Armagh in the 2019 National Football League. McElhinney had been an unused substitute in that game and the game before, though he had played in three earlier games of that year's league. In April, Martin O'Reilly withdrew from the panel ahead of the 2019 Ulster Senior Football Championship after experiencing limited match time during the 2019 National Football League.

Also opting to depart for the 2019 season were Kilcar trio Mark McHugh, Ciaran McGinley and Stephen McBrearty. Following the death of a clubmate in a car accident in January 2019, Odhrán Mac Niallais opted out of the Donegal panel.

Michael Carroll returned to the panel after leaving the previous year.

== Competitions ==
=== Dr McKenna Cup ===
The 2019 season started with a 0–21 to 0–11 defeat of Queen's in the 2019 Dr McKenna Cup at MacCumhail Park on 30 December 2018. Ciarán Thompson was the man of the match and scored four of Donegal's points.

Donegal qualified for the semi-final.

Pos	Team	Pld	W	D	L	PF	PA	PR	Pts	Qualification
1	Donegal	3	3	0	0	64	36	1.778	6	Advance to semi-final
2	Cavan	3	2	0	1	45	38	1.184	4	
3	Down	3	1	0	2	52	41	1.268	2	
4	Queen's University	3	0	0	3	22	68	0.324	0	

Updated to match(es) played on 9 January 2019. Source: Ulster GAA

==== Fixtures ====
30 December 2018 Round 1	Donegal	0-21 (21) – (11) 0-11	Queen's University	Ballybofey
14:00 GMT (UTC+0)				Venue: Páirc MacCumhaill
		Report		Referee: Niall McKenna

6 January 2019 Round 2	Down	0-10 (10) – (20) 1-17	Donegal	Newry
14:00 GMT (UTC+0)				Venue: Páirc Esler
		Report

9 January 2019 Round 3	Donegal	1-20 (23) – (15) 1-12	Cavan	Ballybofey
20:00 GMT (UTC+0)				Venue: Páirc MacCumhaill

13 January 2019
14:00 GMT (UTC±0)
Semi-Final 1

Report

Donegal	1-10 (13) – (14) 0-14	Armagh
(HT: 1-05 – 0-09)

Healy Park, Omagh
Referee: Paul Faloon (Down)

=== National Football League Division 2 ===
Neil McGee equalled Colm McFadden's record of 173 appearances for Donegal when he came on as a second half substitute in the final round of the 2019 National Football League, a victory over Kildare. He then broke McFadden's record with his 174th appearance for his county against Meath as a substitute in the final at Croke Park, also won by Donegal.

Donegal qualified for the Division 2 final, and won the game.

==== Table ====
Pos	Team	Pld	W	D	L	PF	PA	PD	Pts	Qualification or relegation
1	Meath	7	6	0	1	111	84	+27	12	Advance to Division 2 Final
2	Donegal	7	5	0	2	112	94	+18	10	Advance to Division 2 Final
3	Fermanagh	7	3	2	2	69	74	−5	8	
4	Kildare	7	3	1	3	87	93	−6	7	
5	Armagh	7	2	2	3	101	97	+4	6	
6	Clare	7	2	1	4	107	113	−6	5	
7	Cork	7	2	1	4	91	112	−21	5	Relegation to Division 3
8	Tipperary	7	1	1	5	99	110	−11	3	Relegation to Division 3

Updated to match(es) played on 1 April 2019. Source: GAA.ie
Rules for classification: 1) League points; 2) Where two teams only are involved – the outcome of the meeting of the two teams in the League; 3) Score difference – subtracting the total scores against from the scores for; 4) Highest total score for; 5) Highest total goals for; 6) A play-off.

==== Fixtures ====
27 January 2019 Round 1	Clare	0-13 (13) – (16) 0-16	Donegal	Ennis
14:00 GMT (UTC+0)				Venue: Cusack Park
		Report		Referee: Padraig O'Sullivan (Kerry)

2 February 2019 Round 2	Donegal	1-13 (16) – (14) 0-14	Meath	Ballybofey
19:00 GMT (UTC+0)				Venue: MacCumhaill Park
		Report		Referee: Jerome Henry (Meath)

10 February 2019 Round 3	Tipperary	3-09 (18) – (13) 0-13	Donegal	Thurles
14:00 GMT (UTC+0)				Venue: Semple Stadium
		Report Report

24 February 2019 Round 4	Donegal	0-10 (10) – (13) 0-13	Fermanagh	Letterkenny
14:00 GMT (UTC+0)				Venue: O'Donnell Park
		Report

2 March 2019 Round 5	Donegal	1-09 (12) – (11) 0-11	Armagh	Ballybofey
19:15 GMT (UTC+0)				Venue: MacCumhaill Park
		Report

16 March 2019 Round 6	Cork	1-12 (15) – (22) 1-19	Donegal	Cork
14:00 GMT (UTC+0)				Venue: Pairc Uí Rinn
		Report

24 March 2019 Round 7	Donegal	1-20 (23) – 0-10 (10)	Kildare	Ballyshannon
14:00 GMT (UTC+0)				Venue: Fr Tierney Park
		Report

TG4

30 March 2019
17:00 IST (UTC+1)
Final

Report

Meath	1-15 (18) – (20) 1-17	Donegal

Croke Park, Dublin
Referee: Derek O'Mahoney (Tipperary)

=== Ulster Senior Football Championship ===
Donegal retained the Ulster title.

==== Bracket ====
Preliminary round 12 May 2019
Tyrone	1-19
Derry	1-13

Quarter-finals; 18, 19, 25, 26 May 2019
Cavan	1-13
Monaghan	0-12
Down	3-13
Armagh	2-17
Fermanagh	0-09
Donegal	0-15
Antrim	2-09
Tyrone	2-23

Semi-finals; 2 & 8 June 2019
Cavan (R)	0-17; 0-23
Armagh (R)	1-14; 0-17
Donegal	1-16
Tyrone	0-15

Final; 23 June 2019
Cavan	2-16
Donegal	1-24

==== Fixtures ====
BBC NI

26 May 2019
14:00 IST (UTC+1)
Quarter-Final C

Report

Fermanagh	0-09 (09) – (15) 0-15	Donegal
(HT: 0-4 – 0-5)
Pts: Ultan Kelm 2, Conall Jones 2 (2f), Ciaran Corrigan 2, Ryan Jones 1, Seán Quigley 1, Barry Mulrone 1		Pts: Patrick McBrearty 5 (2f), Jamie Brennan 4, Michael Murphy 2, Michael Langan 1, Jason McGee 1, Leo McLoone 1, Ciarán Thompson 1

Brewster Park, Enniskillen
Referee: Joe McQuillan (Cavan)

RTÉ
BBC NI Deferred

8 June 2019
17:00 IST (UTC+1)
Semi-Final 2

Report

Donegal	1-16 (19) – (15) 0-15	Tyrone
(HT: 1-9 – 0-5)
Gls: Jamie Brennan 1 Pts: Michael Murphy 5 (2f, 1 '45'), Jamie Brennan 3, Patrick McBrearty 3 (1f), Ryan McHugh 1, Michael Langan 1, Eoin McHugh 1, Hugh McFadden 1, Stephen McMenamin 1		Pts: Cathal McShane 4 (3f), Darren McCurry 3 (1f), Richard Donnelly 2, Kieran McGeary 2, Niall Morgan 2 (1f, 1 '45'), Michael Cassidy 1, Mattie Donnelly 1

Breffni Park, Cavan
Referee: David Gough (Meath)

RTÉ
BBC NI

23 June 2019
14:00 IST (UTC+1)
Final

Report

Cavan	2-16 (22) – (27) 1-24	Donegal
(HT: 0-5 – 0-13)
Gls: Conor Madden 1, Stephen Murray 1 Pts: Gearoid McKiernan 6 (2f), Dara McVeety 3, Conor Moynagh 1, Conor Brady 1, Oisin Pierson 1, Conor Madden 1, Cian Mackey 1, Caoimhin O'Reilly 1, Jack Brady 1		Gls: Jamie Brennan 1 Pts: Patrick McBrearty 5 (1f), Jamie Brennan 4, Michael Murphy 4 (2f), Jason McGee 2, Ciarán Thompson 2, Ryan McHugh 1, Eoghan Bán Gallagher 1, Hugh McFadden 1, Niall O'Donnell 1, Michael Langan 1, Daire Ó Baoill 1, Oisín Gallen 1

St Tiernach's Park, Clones
Referee: Conor Lane (Cork)
Attendance: 28,780

=== All-Ireland Senior Football Championship ===
==== Quarter-finals Group 1 table ====
Pos	Team	Pld	W	D	L	PF	PA	PD	Pts	Qualification
1	Kerry	3	2	1	0	72	54	+18	5	Advance to semi-finals
2	Mayo	3	2	0	1	55	52	+3	4	Advance to semi-finals
3	Donegal	3	1	1	1	61	56	+5	3	
4	Meath	3	0	0	3	46	72	−26	0	

Updated to match(es) played on 3 August 2019. Source:

==== Fixtures ====
14 July 2019 Phase 1	Donegal	2-19 (25) – (16) 1-13	Meath	Ballybofey
14:00 IST (UTC+1)		(HT: 1-9 – 0-8)		Venue: MacCumhaill Park
	Gls: Patrick McBrearty 1, Oisín Gallen 1 Pts: Patrick McBrearty 6 (2f), Michael Murphy 3 (1 '45'), Jamie Brennan 3, Ryan McHugh 2, Oisín Gallen 1, Niall O'Donnell 1, Michael Langan 1, Jason McGee 1, Eoin McHugh 1	Report	Gls: Mickey Newman 1 (1p); Pts: Bryan McMahon 0-3, Mickey Newman 2 (1f), Cillian O'Sullivan 2, Bryan Menton 2, James Conlon 1, James McEntee 1, Shane McEntee 1, Darragh Campion 1	Referee: Conor Lane (Cork); TV: Sky Sports

21 July 2019 Phase 2	Kerry	1-20 (23) – (23) 1-20	Donegal	Dublin
16:00 IST (UTC+1)		(HT: 0-10 – 0-9)		Venue: Croke Park
	Gls: Paul Geaney 1 Pts: Paul Geaney 4, Sean O'Shea 4 (3f), David Clifford 3 (1f), Stephen O’Brien 3, Killian Spillane 3, Tom O’Sullivan 1, Jason Foley 1, Paul Murphy 1	Report	Gls: Michael Murphy 1 (1p); Pts: Michael Murphy 7 (4f), Patrick McBrearty 5 (3f), Ryan McHugh 2, Oisín Gallen 2, Michael Langan 2, Jason McGee 1, Niall O’Donnell 1	Referee: Paddy Neilan (Roscommon); TV: RTÉ

3 August 2019 Phase 3	Mayo	1-14 (17) – (13) 1-10	Donegal	Castlebar
18:00 IST (UTC+1)		(HT: 1-7 – 0-4)		Venue: MacHale Park
	Gls: Cillian O’Connor 1 Pts: Cillian O’Connor 4 (4f), Paddy Durcan 3, James Carr 2, Andy Moran 2, Jason Doherty 1, Chris Barrett 1, Kevin McLoughlin 1	Report	Gls: Michael Murphy 1 (1p); Pts: Michael Murphy 4 (2f) Paddy McBrearty 2, Niall O’Donnell 2, Daire Ó Baoill 2	Referee: David Gough (Meath); Attendance: 27,369; TV: Sky Sports

== Management team ==
Confirmed in November 2017, with replacements noted:

- Manager: Declan Bonner
- Assistant manager: Paul McGonigle, not listed among November 2017 appointments
- Head coach: John McElholm
- Coach: Gary Boyle
- Selector: Stephen Rochford, replacing Karl Lacey after 2018 season but Lacey actually carried on until the end of 2020
- Goalkeeping coach: Andrew McGovern
- Strength and conditioning coach: Paul Fisher
- Nutritionist: Ronan Doherty
- Team physician: Kevin Moran
- Physio: Cathal Ellis
- Psychology and performance manager: Anthony McGrath, previously involved with the minor team
- Video analysis: Chris Byrne
- Logistics: Packie McDyre
- Kitman: Barry McBride

== Awards ==
=== Footballer of the Year ===
Michael Murphy

=== GAA.ie Football Team of the Week ===
- 28 January: Jason McGee
- 25 March: Shaun Patton, Ryan McHugh, Jason McGee
- 1 April: Jason McGee, Michael Murphy, Oisín Gallen; Murphy nominated for Footballer of the Week
- 10 June: Stephen McMenamin, Michael Murphy, Jamie Brennan; Murphy nominated for, and selected as, Footballer of the Week
- 24 June: Hugh McFadden, Jamie Brennan; Brennan nominated for, and selected as, Footballer of the Week
- 15 July: Ryan McHugh, Michael Murphy, Patrick McBrearty; McBrearty nominated for Footballer of the Week
- 22 July: Ryan McHugh, Michael Murphy; Murphy nominated for, and selected as, Footballer of the Week
- 6 August: Daire Ó Baoill, Michael Murphy

=== The Irish News Ulster All Stars ===
Shaun Patton, Stephen McMenamin, Paddy McGrath, Ryan McHugh, Eoghan Bán Gallagher, Michael Murphy, Jamie Brennan and Patrick McBrearty were all included, and Murphy was named Player of the Year.

=== The Sunday Game Team of the Year ===
The Sunday Game selected Michael Murphy on its Team of the Year.

=== All Stars ===
Michael Murphy won an All Star. Shaun Patton, Stephen McMenamin, Ryan McHugh, Jamie Brennan and Patrick McBrearty were also nominated.

Pos.	Player	Team	Appearances
GK	Stephen Cluxton^{FOTY}	Dublin	6
RCB	Michael Fitzsimons	Dublin	2
FB	Ronan McNamee	Tyrone	1
LCB	Tom O'Sullivan	Kerry	1
RWB	Patrick Durcan	Mayo	1
CB	Brian Howard	Dublin	2
LWB	Jack McCaffrey	Dublin	4
MD	Brian Fenton	Dublin	4
MD	David Moran	Kerry	2
RWF	Paul Mannion	Dublin	3
CF	Seán O'Shea	Kerry	1
LWF	Michael Murphy	Donegal	3
RCF	David Clifford	Kerry	2
FF	Cathal McShane	Tyrone	1
LCF	Con O'Callaghan	Dublin	2

County breakdown

- Dublin = 7
- Kerry = 4
- Tyrone = 2
- Mayo = 1
- Donegal = 1
