= Ryan McHugh =

Donegal Gaelic footballer

Personal information
- Native name: Riain Mac Aodha (Irish)
- Born: 11 April 1994 (age 32) Letterkenny, Ireland
- Occupations: Business development manager at Ocean Knowledge
- Height: 1.75 m (5 ft 9 in)

Sport
- Sport: Gaelic football
- Position: Left half forward
Club
- Years: Club
- 2011–: Cill Chartha
Club titles
- Donegal titles: 1
Inter-county*
Years	County	Apps (scores)
2013–	Donegal	57 (8–43)
Inter-county titles
- Ulster titles: 5
- All Stars: 2
- *Inter County team apps and scores correct as of match played 30 June 2024.

Ryan McHugh (born 11 April 1994) is an Irish Gaelic footballer who plays for Cill Chartha and the Donegal county team. He is the brother of Mark and the son of Martin.

A former county minor, McHugh propelled himself onto the national stage in 2014 with a 2–2 blitz of reigning All-Ireland champions Dublin in their live televised semi-final meeting at Croke Park.

== Early life and family ==
McHugh was reared in Bavin, in south-west Donegal. He is the son of Patrice and the brother of Rachel.

He is also the son of Martin, the former BBC television analyst and 1992 All-Ireland Senior Football Championship winner. His son Mark, Ryan's older brother, is also an All-Ireland SFC winner with Donegal. Ryan McHugh's uncle James also played in the 1992 All-Ireland Final and received an All Star in 1992. His cousin Eoin is James's son.

As a six-year-old holidaying with his parents, his brother Mark and his sister in Upstate New York, McHugh was the target of an attack by a wild animal, a fox. McHugh was bitten and mauled by the fox after his brother Mark ran away. A man came along and hauled the wild animal off of young McHugh.

== Playing career ==
=== Club ===
With his club Cill Chartha, McHugh won the 2012 Donegal Minor Football Championship as team captain. He scored one point in the final.

He also won the 2017 Donegal Senior Football Championship, scoring a point in the final. It was the first time his club had won the title in 24 years, having been defeated by Glenswilly at the same stage the previous year.

=== Inter-county ===
==== Underage ====
McHugh won an All-Ireland Vocational Schools Championship and captained the 2012 Donegal minor team.

He played in the team that lost to Cavan in the 2013 Ulster Under-21 Football Championship final, though had been troubled by a calf injury beforehand.

He also played in the team that lost to Cavan in the 2014 Ulster Under-21 Football Championship final.

He played in the 2015 Ulster Under-21 Football Championship final loss to Tyrone.

==== Jim McGuinness: 2013–14 ====
McHugh narrowly missed out on Donegal's 2012 All-Ireland Senior Football Championship victory, as he was not involved until the following year.

Jim McGuinness drafted McHugh into his senior squad ahead of the 2013 season, with Donegal the defending All-Ireland champions. Colm Keys of the Irish Independent named him as the third of his "ten young guns aiming to fire in the league" ahead of the 2013 National Football League.

McHugh made his senior competitive debut in a home game against Down in the 2013 National Football League on 9 February 2013. He made his senior championship debut against Down as well later that year in June. Photographs of him appeared in the media the following day.

McHugh won his first Ulster Senior Football Championship title in 2014, scoring one point as Donegal defeated Monaghan in the final.

McHugh propelled himself onto the national stage with a 2–2 blitz of All-Ireland SFC title holder Dublin in the 2014 semi-final meeting at Croke Park on 31 August. Man of the match in that game, McHugh described himself as "fortunate" to have scored his two goals. His brother Mark left him to the bus that morning, then sat by "and watched as [Ryan McHugh] became a household name in one afternoon". Donegal qualified for the 2014 All-Ireland Senior Football Championship Final but lost to Kerry by a single score, with Colm McFadden striking the goalpost to the left of goalkeeper Brian Kelly in the third minute of stoppage time. In October 2014, McHugh was named as that year's GAA/GPA Young Footballer of the Year.

==== Bonner–McGuinness interim: 2014–17 ====
Under the management of McGuinness's Rory Gallagher, McHugh started the opening fixture of the 2015 National Football League at home to Derry. He also started the next game against Dublin at Croke Park, the third fixture against Cork in Ballyshannon and the fourth fixture against Monaghan. He started the fifth fixture against Kerry at Austin Stack Park and scored a goal. He started the sixth fixture against Tyrone and scored 1–1. He also started the seventh fixture against Mayo. Donegal qualified for the NFL semi-final. McHugh also started and completed this game but was held scoreless.

McHugh started the 2015 Ulster SFC final. He had previously started the preliminary round against Tyrone, the quarter-final against Armagh and the semi-final against Derry. McHugh scored an important goal in the 2015 All-Ireland SFC qualifier defeat of Galway at Croke Park and started the next game against Mayo at the same venue.

McHugh started the opening fixture of the 2016 National Football League away to Down and scored 2–0. He then started the second fixture against Cork, a ten-point win in Ballyshannon. He started the third fixture against Mayo and scored 0–2. He started the fourth fixture, away to Kerry at Austin Stack Park. He started the fifth fixture against Roscommon and scored 0–1. He also started the sixth and seventh fixtures, away to Dublin at Croke Park and Monaghan in Castleblayney respectively. Donegal qualified for the NFL semi-final. McHugh started this game too.

McHugh started the 2016 Ulster SFC final, scoring 0–3. He had previously started the quarter-final against Fermanagh, the semi-final against Monaghan and the semi-final replay against the same opposition. McHugh scored 0–3 in the 2016 All-Ireland SFC qualifier defeat of Cork at Croke Park. He then scored yet another goal against reigning All-Ireland SFC champions Dublin in the next game, at the same venue. His performances during the 2016 season earned him an All Star, the county's 32nd.

McHugh started the opening fixture of the 2017 National Football League against Kerry and scored 0–1. He then started the second fixture away to Roscommon. He scored another goal against Dublin in the third round of fixtures. He started the fourth fixture against Cavan and scored 0–1. He started the fifth fixture against Tyrone and scored 0–2. He also started the sixth fixture against Monaghan.

McHugh started the 2017 Ulster SFC quarter-final victory against Antrim (scoring 0–1) and the semi-final loss to Tyrone. He started the 2017 All-Ireland SFC qualifier defeat of Meath at Páirc Tailteann and scored a goal. He then started the qualifier loss to Galway at Markievicz Park.

==== Declan Bonner: 2017–2022 ====
Under the management of Declan Bonner, McHugh started for Donegal in the opening fixture of the 2018 National Football League against Kerry in Killarney. He scored a point in the next game against Galway. He scored 0–3 in the third game against Dublin and 1–2 in the fourth game against Kildare. He started against Tyrone and Monaghan in the fifth and sixth games, though was not part of the seventh game against Mayo.

McHugh started the final and scored a goal as Donegal secured the 2018 Ulster SFC. He had previously started the preliminary round against Cavan (scoring a goal), the quarter-final against Derry (scoring 0–2) and the semi-final against Down (again scoring 0–2).

On 26 September 2018, however, it was announced that McHugh had accepted medical advice and would be sidelined for the remainder of the year due to concussion. His injury came while playing for his club in a challenge match against Dublin champions St Vincents in Cavan in late August 2018 — he received a blow to the head during that match. Concussion had also caused McHugh to spend six weeks on the sideline following a 2018 National Football League game (against Kildare or Tyrone depending on which report you read) earlier that year. The injury meant he could take no part in the 2018 Donegal Senior Football Championship (of which his club were the defending champions), news which was worsened when taken in the context of the earlier loss of McHugh's club and county teammate Patrick McBrearty to a cruciate ligament injury. McHugh won a second All-Star at the end of the season. This remarkable achievement was further contextualized when McHugh later revealed he had suffered a "a slight bleed" in his brain and two concussions in seven months during that season.

McHugh started against Clare in the opening fixture of the 2019 National Football League in Ennis. He also started the next fixtures against Meath, Tipperary, Fermanagh and Armagh. He started and scored two points in the sixth fixture against Cork. He started the seventh fixture against Kildare and scored three points. Donegal qualified for the National Football League Division 2 final and McHugh started the game as Donegal defeated Meath to win the title.

McHugh won his third Ulster SFC in 2019, scoring one point as Donegal defeated Cavan in the final. He had previously started the quarter-final against Fermanagh and the semi-final against Tyrone (scoring 0–1 in the latter game).

McHugh started each of Donegal's first five fixtures of the 2020 National Football League against Mayo, Meath, Galway, Dublin and Monaghan, though he scored only once (against Mayo in the opening game). Then the COVID-19 pandemic brought play to a halt. Play resumed behind closed doors on 18 October with a home game against Tyrone; McHugh started that game and scored three points. He did not participate in the concluding game of the league campaign (away to Kerry) as he and other senior players (such as Michael Murphy, Hugh McFadden and Eoghan Bán Gallagher) were rested ahead of the 2020 Ulster SFC quarter-final against Tyrone the following Sunday. McHugh started and completed that opening victory against Tyrone, though he did not score. He also started the semi-final victory against Armagh, scoring two points. McHugh made his hundredth appearance for Donegal against Cavan in the 2020 Ulster SFC final. He scored a point in what proved to be the season's concluding game for his team.

McHugh started in the half-back line in each of Donegal's four fixtures of the 2021 National Football League (against Tyrone, Monaghan, Armagh and Dublin), completing all four and scoring a point against Armagh.

In the 2021 Ulster SFC, he started each of Donegal's three fixtures and scored four points against Down in the opening round but was held scoreless against Derry in the quarter-final and against Tyrone in the semi-final.

McHugh started each of Donegal's fixtures of the 2022 National Football League, against Mayo, Kildare, Kerry, Tyrone, Monaghan, Dublin and Armagh. He scored a point against Mayo, followed by a goal and a point in the second fixture against Kildare. He did not score in the third fixture, away to Kerry. He scored a point against Tyrone in the fourth fixture but failed to score again in the next game, a loss to Monaghan. He then scored a point away to Dublin in the penultimate fixture, before being held scoreless in the win against Armagh at O'Donnell Park.

In the 2022 Ulster SFC, McHugh started each of Donegal's three fixtures but was held scoreless in two of them, the quarter-final against Armagh and the semi-final against Cavan. He scored one point in the final against Derry but his team lost that game after extra-time. He also started the 2022 All-Ireland Senior Football Championship qualifier loss to Armagh, scoring a point.

==== After Declan Bonner: 2022– ====
After not playing until that point of the 2023 season due to injury, McHugh confirmed his departure from the panel in early April (ahead of the championship), due to a combination of injury and an employment offer that involved travelling abroad.

Kerry's Micheál Burns was shown a red card in Killarney in the 2026 championship after his "dirty punch" left McHugh with a split eye and blood pouring from his face as the teams prepared to leave the field at half-time. McHugh emerged with his head heavily bandaged and had to be substituted such was the severity of his injuries.

== Player profile ==
McHugh's footballing intelligence is equivalent to that of Peter Canavan and his instincts are similar to Maurice Fitzgerald. He is possessed of a low centre of gravity and a slight physical frame. With an excellent positional sense, he dips his shoulders to set off on a run. Over 30 metres he can accelerate his pace. His mannerisms and temperament are more similar to his father than the other McHughs. Though he plays in the half-back line, he is often a goalscorer.

McHugh has been likened to a child of school-going age — "You'd think he had just stepped off a school bus", Benny Tierney, the GAA pundit, once said. His county manager Jim McGuinness has suggested: "Even when the big hits are going in, Ryan has the ability to summon that little shimmy that helps to take him past defenders and allows him to set up colleagues." Ciarán Kilkenny is another admirer.

== Other activities ==
=== English Football League Championship ===
McHugh, though from a football family, often used to play a bit of soccer with St Catherine's "as a distraction". A scout for the professional English league side Reading spotted him at the age of 16 and McHugh was invited to England for a trial. However, after playing several games, McHugh decided he would prefer to return to football so off he went, back home. That Reading team, then managed by Brian McDermott, were one year away from promotion to the Premier League.

=== Peil Star video ===
In 2016, Ryan appeared in a street Gaelic football film created by Peil Star with Kieran Hughes (Monaghan), Richie Donnelly (Tyrone) and Niall McKeever (Antrim). The film was shot at Belfast's Titanic Quarter.

== Personal life ==
On Friday, 15 December 2023, McHugh married Bridget Molloy, originally from Ardara, County Donegal, with the ceremony taking place at Ardara Church, the reception being held at Jackson's Hotel in Ballybofey, and then the celebrations continuing the following day at the Blue Haven Hotel in Kilcar. They had not decided then on where to go on their honeymoon. McHugh and Molloy had dated for 11 years, and McHugh had spoken about her since at least 2016. McHugh announced their engagement while in New York City in July 2022. Though they met in Sligo while attending college, McHugh and Molloy had been close to one another in County Donegal without noticing each other until that time. They began sharing an apartment in Donegal Town from November 2019 onwards. Molloy also attended the University of Galway, before taking up employment with the Health Service Executive (HSE). In June 2024, the couple opened McBrew, a coffee shop at the Diamond in Donegal Town. In a weird echo of Mark's birth after Martin played for Donegal against Meath in the semi-final of the 1990 All-Ireland SFC, Ryan's son Senán was born just before he played in the quarter-final of the 2025 All-Ireland SFC, where a place in the semi-final was up for grabs against - Meath.

As of 2020, Ryan McHugh was working at Ocean Knowledge, a fertiliser company, in Kilcar. Ocean Knowledge employs him in the role of business development manager. His cousin Eoin also works there. The McHugh cousins often play golf together.

He has supported the English association football club Arsenal since childhood.

== Career statistics ==
As of match played 30 June 2024

Appearances and scores by team, season and competition (Note: Statistics as far as the 2020 Ulster final compiled by Fr Seán Ó Gallchóir (ahead of McHugh's 100th appearance) and published as follows: "McHugh hits 100 mark for Donegal". Donegal News. 19 November 2020. p. 57. That game (which ended his team's season) and McHugh's point in it have also been included in the table above.)
Team	Season	National League			Championship		McKenna Cup		Total	
Team	Season	Division	Apps	Score	Apps	Score	Apps	Score	Apps	Score
Donegal	2013	Division 1	5	0–1	4	0–1	—	—	9	0–2
Donegal	2014	Division 2	7	0–1	6	2–3	—	—	13	2–4
Donegal	2015	Division 1	8	2–1	6	1–0	—	—	14	3–1
Donegal	2016	Division 1	8	2–4	6	1–6	—	—	14	3–10
Donegal	2017	Division 1	6	1–4	5	1–0	—	—	11	2–4
Donegal	2018	Division 1	5	1–5	7	2–8	1	1–1	13	4–14
Donegal	2019	Division 2	8	0–5	6	0–6	2	0–1	16	0–12
Donegal	2020	Division 1	6	0–4	3	0–3	1	—	10	0–7
Donegal	2021	Division 1 North			3	0–4			3	0–4
Donegal	2022	Division 1			4	0–2			4	0–2
Donegal	2023	Division 1			0	0-00				
Donegal	2024	Division 2			7	1-10				
Donegal	2025	Division 1								
Total			53	6–25	57	8–43	4	1–2	107	14–60

== Honours ==
Donegal

- All-Ireland Senior Football Championship runner-up: 2014, 2025
- Ulster Senior Football Championship: 2014, 2018, 2019, 2024, 2025
- National Football League Division 2: 2019
- Ulster Under-21 Football Championship runner-up: 2013, 2014, 2015
- Ulster MFL Shield: 2011
- All-Ireland Vocational Schools Championship: 2011

Cill Chartha

- Donegal Senior Football Championship: 2017
- Donegal Senior Football League Division 1: 2014, 2016, 2017, 2019
- Donegal Under-21 Football Championship: 2011, 2013, 2015
- Donegal Minor Football Championship: 2012 (c)

Individual

- GAA/GPA Young Footballer of the Year: 2014
- All Star: 2016, 2018
  - Nominated in 2014, 2015, 2016, 2018, 2019, 2024, 2025
- Irish News Player of the Year: 2014
- Irish News Team of the Year: 2014, 2015, 2016, 2018, 2019
