= Cian Mulligan =

Irish Gaelic footballer

Personal information
- Born: 4 March 1996 (age 30) Gweedore, County Donegal

Sport
- Sport: Gaelic football
Club
- Years: Club
- 201?–: Gaoth Dobhair
Club titles
- Donegal titles: 1
- Ulster titles: 1
Inter-county
- Years: County
- 201?–: Donegal
- Ulster titles: 1

Cian Mulligan (/ˈkiːən/ KEE-ən, Irish: [ˈciənˠ]; born 4 March 1996) is an Irish Gaelic footballer who plays for Gaoth Dobhair and the Donegal county team.

He scored two goals in the 2018 Ulster Senior Football Championship, a competition which his county team won. He also scored a goal in the 2018 Ulster Senior Club Football Championship, a competition which his club won.

== Playing career ==
=== Club ===
Mulligan won a Donegal Senior Football Championship medal with his club in 2018, scoring three points in the final.

He then played during Gaoth Dobhair's first ever Ulster Senior Club Football Championship-winning campaign later in 2018, a run which involved a quarter final defeat of Cargin (a game in which Mulligan scored a goal and a point), a semi-final defeat of eleven-time winners Crossmaglen Rangers (a game in which Mulligan scored a point), and culminated in the club defeating Scotstown (who had won the competition on four previous occasions), the last two of these games occurring at Healy Park in Omagh. Mulligan scored a point in the Ulster final, vital as the sides were separated by one point in the end, following extra time.

=== Inter-county ===
Mulligan won the 2014 Ulster Minor Football Championship title with Donegal; they defeated Armagh in the final. He played in the 2014 All-Ireland Minor Football Championship final loss to Kerry, scoring one point.

He made a substitute appearance in the 2015 Ulster Under-21 Football Championship final loss to Tyrone.

First featuring at senior level for his county under the management of Rory Gallagher, Mulligan started against Monaghan and against Mayo during Donegal's Division One campaign in the 2017 National Football League.

Under the management of Declan Bonner, Mulligan made a substitute appearance against Cavan in the preliminary round of the 2018 Ulster Senior Football Championship, scoring a goal as his county progressed to the quarter-final. He made another substitute appearance against Derry in that quarter-final, scoring another goal as his county progressed to the semi-final. He made another substitute appearance in the final and scored a point to help Donegal to victory.

He opted out of inter-county football for the 2019 season but returned ahead of the 2020 season.

He was not part of the panel during the 2022 season.

== Personal life ==
Mulligan emigrated in 2023.

== Honours ==
Donegal

- Ulster Senior Football Championship: 2018
- Ulster Under-21 Football Championship runner-up: 2015
- All-Ireland Minor Football Championship runner-up: 2014
- Ulster Minor Football Championship: 2014

Gaoth Dobhair

- Ulster Senior Club Football Championship: 2018
- Donegal Senior Football Championship: 2018
