= 2023 Donegal county football team season =

Donegal county football team
2023 season
- Manager: Paddy Carr
- Stadium: MacCumhaill Park, Ballybofey
- NFL D1: 8th (relegated)
- All-Ireland SFC: Preliminary quarter-finalist
- Ulster SFC: Quarter-finalist
- Dr McKenna Cup: Group stage

The following is a summary of Donegal county football team's 2023 season.

== Personnel changes ==
Neil McGee retired from inter-county football at the end of the 2022 season with a record 195 appearances for the team, announcing his decision, shortly before his 37th birthday, in an exclusive interview given to Frank Craig and published in the Donegal News on 29 September 2022.

Paddy Carr was announced as manager on 24 October, succeeding Declan Bonner, with Aidan O'Rourke joining as head coach at the same time.

Michael Murphy, who had captained his county since the 2011 season, announced his retirement from inter-county football on 16 November 2022. He released a statement via the county board. Murphy's retirement, at the age of 33, was unexpected. The Irish Times stated: "For new manager Paddy Carr it is as bad a start as one can imagine, like picking up a Porsche only to discover it comes without an engine or a steering wheel".

Declan McIntyre succeeded James Gallagher as goalkeeping coach.

In January 2023, it was announced that Patrick McBrearty would succeed the retired michael Murphy as team Donegal team captain.

After not playing until that point in the season due to injury, Ryan McHugh confirmed his departure from the panel in early April (ahead of the championship), due to a combination of injury and an employment offer that involved travelling abroad.

== Squad ==
List of players

== Competitions ==
=== Dr McKenna Cup ===
The McKenna Cup group draw took place on Tuesday night, 13 December 2022. Held at the Glenavon Hotel in Cookstown, the draw was seeded to prevent too many fixtures between teams in the same divisions of the National Football League (four of the nine teams were to play in Division 1, while four of the other five teams were to play in Division 3).

In the first week of January 2023, Carr revealed his first starting line-up as manager.

Kane Barrett, Domhnall Mac Giolla Bhride, Luke McGlynn, Johnny McGroddy, Jack McSharry, John Ross Molloy, Brian O'Donnell, Hugh O'Donnell and Joel Bradley Walsh all made their senior inter-county debuts against Down, while Gavin Mulreany was named as starting goalkeeper for the game against Monaghan, which also saw the first inclusions in the panel of such players as Philip Doherty (Naomh Columba), Kealan Dunleavy (Glenswilly) and Kieran Tobin (St Eunan's).

Pos	Team	Pld	W	D	L	PF	PA	PR	Pts	Qualification
1	Down	2	2	0	0	36	25	1.440	4	Advance to semi-final
2	Monaghan	2	1	0	1	27	29	0.931	2	
3	Donegal	2	0	0	2	26	35	0.743	0	

Source: Ulster GAA

==== Fixtures ====
8 January 2023 Round 2	Down	2–14 – 1–10	Donegal	Newry
13:30 IST (UTC)	Pat Havern 0–5, Liam Kerr 1–1, Conor Francis 1–1, Barry O'Hagan 0–2 (0–1f), Anthony Doherty 0–1 (0–1 '45), Patrick Branagan 0–1, Niall Donnelly 0–1, Mark Walsh 0–1, Tom Close 0–1	Report	Paddy McBrearty 0–5 (0–3f, 0–1m), Daire Ó Baoill 1–0, Jamie Brennan 0–2 (0–1f), Ciarán Thompson 0–1, Johnny McGroddy 0–1, Kane Barrett 0–1	Stadium: Páirc Esler; Referee: Maggie Farrelly

11 January 2023 Round 3	Donegal	2–7 – 0–15	Monaghan	Ballybofey
19:30 IST (UTC)	Joel Bradley Walsh 1–1, Luke McGlynn 1–0 (1–0 pen), Johnny McGroddy 0–2 (0–2f), Jamie Brennan 0–1 (0–1f), Marty O'Reilly 0–1, Daire Ó Baoill 0–1, Conor O'Donnell 0–1	Report	Micheál Bannigan 0–6 (0–6f), Rory Beggan 0–2 (0–2f), Sean Jones 0–2, Shane Carey 0–2, Darren McDonnell 0–1 (0–1f), Jack McCarron 0–1 (0–1f), Stephen O'Hanlon 0–1	Stadium: MacCumhaill Park; Referee: Conor Dourneen

=== National Football League Division 1 ===
Donegal began with a home fixture against 2022 league and 2022 All-Ireland champions Kerry. Many players were missing, including Peadar Mogan (studying in Liverpool), Ethan O'Donnell (wanting to travel in 2023), Oisín Gallen and Michael Langan (both injured), Ciarán Thompson (who had a new injury), and Shane O'Donnell (unspecified). Despite this, Donegal defeated Kerry, in a game when Caolan McColgan kicked three points on his debut and was named man-of-the-match.

Hugh McFadden made his 101st appearance for Donegal against Monaghan in the 2023 National Football League, when he also captained the team; Eoghan Bán Gallagher, Oisín Gallen and Michael Langan started for the first time in 2023, replacing Jamie Grant, Johnny McGroddy and Patrick McBrearty, while Peadar Mogan and Rory O'Donnell were listed among the substitutes.

League appearances by other new players included: Mark Curran and Johnny McGroddy started against Kerry. Luke McGlynn made a substitute appearance against Kerry.

Mark Curran and Johnny McGroddy started against Tyrone. Jamie Grant, Joel Bradley Walsh and Brian O'Donnell made substitute appearances.

Mark Curran started against Monaghan. Luke McGlynn, Rory O'Donnell and Johnny McGroddy made substitute appearances.

Mark Curran started against Galway. Rory O'Donnell and Johnny McGroddy made substitute appearances.

Mark Curran and C. O'Dowd started against Armagh. Rory O'Donnell made a substitute appearance.

Mark Curran started against Mayo. Rory O'Donnell, Joel Bradley Walsh and Kane Barrett made substitute appearances.

Mark Curran, John Ross Molloy and Johnny McGroddy started against Roscommon. Kieran Tobin, Kealan Dunleavy, Joel Bradley Walsh and Brian O'Donnell made substitute appearances.

==== Table ====
Pos	Team	Pld	W	D	L	PF	PA	PD	Pts	Qualification
1	Mayo	7	4	2	1	126	102	+24	10	Advance to National League Final
2	Galway	7	4	2	1	93	91	+2	10	Advance to National League Final
3	Roscommon	7	4	0	3	105	92	+13	8	
4	Tyrone	7	4	0	3	113	110	+3	8	
5	Kerry	7	3	0	4	106	104	+2	6	
6	Monaghan	7	3	0	4	109	119	−10	6	
7	Armagh	7	2	1	4	95	98	−3	5	Relegation to 2024 NFL Division 2
8	Donegal	7	1	1	5	76	117	−41	3	Relegation to 2024 NFL Division 2

Source: GAA
Rules for classification: Tiebreakers

==== Fixtures ====
29 January 2023 Round 1	Donegal	0-13 (13) – (12) 1-09	Kerry	Ballybofey
				Venue: MacCumhaill Park
	Pts: C McColgan 3, C O'Donnell 3, D Ó Baoill 2, J McGroddy `1, J Brennan 1, L McGlynn 1, P McBrearty 1.	Report	Gls: D Moynihan 1. Pts: D Roche 3, P Murphy 2, T O'Sullivan 1, K Spillane 1, R Buckley 1, D O'Sullivan 1.	Referee: L Devenney (Mayo)

5 February 2023 Round 2	Tyrone	0-16 (16) – (8) 0-08	Donegal	Omagh
14:00 IST (UTC)				Venue: O'Neill's Healy Park
	Pts: D McCurry 7 (6f 1m), D Canavan 3, C Munroe 1, F Burns 1, C Quinn 1, P Hampsey 1, B Kennedy 1, C McShane 1 (m).	Report	Pts: J Brennan 2 (1m), C O'Donnell 2, J McKelvey 1, H McFadden 1, P McBrearty 1 (m), J Bradley-Walsh 1 (f).	Referee: David Gough (Meath)

19 February 2023 Round 3	Monaghan	1-20 (23) – (15) 0-15	Donegal	Clones
				Venue: St Tiernach's Park
	Gls: S Jones 1. Pts: J McCarron 7 (4fs, 1m), S O'Hanlon 3, R Beggan 2 (2fs), S Jones 2, C McManus 2 (2ms), C McCarthy 1, K Duffy 1, M Bannigan 1, S Carey 1.	Report	Pts: O Gallen 5 (4fs), M Langan 4, C O'Donnell 3, C McGonagle 1, D Ó Baoill 1, J Brennan 1.	Referee: N Mooney (Cavan)

26 February 2023 Round 4	Donegal	1-09 (12) – (12) 1-09	Galway	Letterkenny
12:30 IST (UTC+1)				Venue: O'Donnell Park
	Gls: O Gallen 1 (pen). Pts: O Gallen 2; C O'Donnell 2, S Patton 1 (f), J Brennan 1, C McGonagle 1, M Langan 1, J McGee 1.	Report	Gls: M Tierney 1. Pts: M Tierney 3 (1 '45), P Conroy 2 (2f), R Finnerty 2, C Sweeney 1, P Cooke 1.	Referee: David Coldrick (Meath)

4 March 2023 Round 5	Armagh	0-13 (13) – (10) 0-10	Donegal	Armagh
19:30 IST (UTC+1)				Venue: Box-It Athletic Grounds
	Pts: R O'Neill 5 (4fs, 145), A Murnin 3 (1m), A Forker 1, J Óg Burns 1, S Campbell 1, E Rafferty 1 (f), R Grugan 1 (f).	Report	Pts: O Gallen 2 (1f), H McFadden 2 (1m), S Patton 2 (2fs), C O'Donnell 1, C Thompson 1, J McGee 1, J Brennan 1.	Referee: J Henry (Mayo); Attendance: 12,582

19 March 2023 Round 6	Donegal	0-9 (9) – (20) 1-17	Mayo	Ballybofey
15:45 IST (UTC+1)				Venue: MacCumhaill Park
	Pts: C Thompson 3 (2 fs), M Langan (2 fs) 3, E Ban Gallaghan 1, J Brennan 1, O Gallen 1.	Report	Gls: R O'Donoghue 1 Pts: R O'Donoghue 3 (1f), A O'Shea 4 (2fs), M Ruane 3, P Durcan 2, J Flynn 2, C Reape 1 (1 45), J Carney 1, P Towey 1.	Referee: Sean Hurson (Tyrone)

26 March 2023 Round 7	Roscommon	0-21 (21) – (9) 0-09	Donegal	Roscommon
13:45 IST (UTC+1)				Venue: Dr Hyde Park
	Pts: D Murtagh 3 (1f), E Smith 3, B O'Carroll 3, C Murtagh 3, K Doyle 2, C McKeon 2, T O'Rourke 1, N Daly 1, C Connolly 1, C Cox 1, B Stack 1.	Report	Pts: C Thompson 2, J Brennan 1, M Langan 1 (1f), E Bán Gallagher 1, C McGonagle 1, J McKelvey 1, C O'Donnell 1, J Brennan 1.	Referee: Joe McQuillan (Cavan)

=== Ulster Senior Football Championship ===
The draw for the 2023 Ulster Championship was made on 15 October 2022.

==== Bracket ====
Preliminary round

Quarter-finals

Semi-finals

Final

Fermanagh
2–8

Derry
3–17

Derry
1–21

Monaghan
2–10

Tyrone
1–18

Monaghan
2–17

Derry
1–15 (3)

Armagh
0–18 (1)

Down
2–13

Donegal
1–11

Down
0–12

Armagh
4–10

Cavan
0–12

Armagh
0–20

Armagh
1–14

Antrim
1–8

==== Fixtures ====
23 April 2023
14:00 IST (UTC+1)
Quarter-final

Donegal	1–11 – 2-13	Down
Jason McGee 1–1, Daire Ó Baoill 0–3, Ciarán Thompson 0–2 (0–2f), Conor O'Donnell 0–2, Shaun Patton 0–1 (0–1 '45), Caolan Ward 0–1, Oisín Gallen 0–1	Report	Pat Havern 1–3 (1–0 pen, 0–3f), Ryan Johnston 0–3 (0–2m), Liam Kerr 1–0, Andrew Gilmore 0–2 (0–1f), Daniel Guinness 0–2, Danny Magill 0–1, Eugene Branagan 0–1, Conor Poland 0–1

Páirc Esler, Newry
Attendance: 9,139
Referee: Brendan Cawley

=== All-Ireland Senior Football Championship ===
Jeaic Mac Ceallabhuí missed the 2023 championship games against Down and Clare because he was studying for exams.

Goalkeeper Gavin Mulreany made his senior championship debut for Donegal as a substitute against Tyrone in the All-Ireland SFC preliminary quarter-final, as a result of Shaun Patton losing his discipline and being issued with a red card after he kicked a Tyrone player.

==== Format ====
16 teams were divided into 4 groups of 4 teams, and played a round robin to qualify for the knockout stages of the All-Ireland SFC. Group games took place between 20 May and 18 June 2023.

==== Seeding ====
Numbers in brackets indicate ranking in the 2023 NFL.

Pot 1

- Galway (2)
- Kerry (5)
- Dublin (7)
- Derry (8)

Pot 2

- Armagh (9)
- Louth (11)
- Clare (17)
- Sligo (23)

Pot 3

- Mayo (1)
- Roscommon (3)
- Tyrone (4)
- Monaghan (6)

Pot 4

- Donegal (10)
- Cork (12)
- Kildare (13)
- Westmeath (20)

==== Group 4 ====
===== Table =====
Pos	Team	Pld	W	D	L	PF	PA	PD	Pts	Qualification
1	Derry	3	2	1	0	59	48	+11	5	Advance to quarter-final
2	Donegal	3	2	0	1	51	49	+2	4	Advance to preliminary quarter-final
3	Monaghan	3	1	1	1	57	54	+3	3	Advance to preliminary quarter-final
4	Clare	3	0	0	3	46	62	−16	0	

Updated to match(es) played on 17 June 2023. Source: GAA

===== Fixtures =====
20 May 2023 Round 1	Clare	0–9 – 0–14	Donegal	Ennis
14:00 IST (UTC+1)	Eoin Cleary 0–2 (0–2f), Emmet McMahon 0–2 (0–1f), Pearse Lillis 0–2, Keelan Sexton 0–1, Darragh Bohannon 0–1, Aaron Griffin 0–1	Report	Ciarán Thompson 0–4, Oisín Gallen 0–4, Caolan McGonagle 0–2, Eoghan Bán Gallagher 0–1, Hugh McFadden 0–1, Luke McGlynn 0–1, Rory O'Donnell 0–1	Stadium: Cusack Park; Attendance: 2,296; Referee: James Molloy

4 June 2023 Round 2	Donegal	1–15 – 3–14	Derry	Ballybofey
16:00 IST (UTC+1)	Oisín Gallen 0–9 (0–3f, 0–3m), Rory O'Donnell 1–0, Ciarán Thompson 0–2 (0–1f), Conor O'Donnell 0–2, Shaun Patton 0–1 (0–1 '45), Patrick McBrearty 0–1	Report	Paul Cassidy 0–4, Shane McGuigan 0–3 (0–1f), Conor Doherty 1–0, Lachlan Murray 1–0, Padraig McGrogan 1–0, Brendan Rogers 0–2, Ciaran McFaul 0–2, Niall Toner 0–1 (0–1f), Conor Glass 0–1, Benny Heron 0–1	Stadium: MacCumhaill Park; Attendance: 8,253; Referee: Brendan Cawley

17 June 2023 Round 3	Monaghan	0–17 – 0–19	Donegal	Omagh
18:00 IST (UTC+1)	Jack McCarron 0–5 (0–3f, 0–1m), Gary Mohan 0–3 (0–1m), Conor Boyle 0–2, Micheál Bannigan 0–2, Darren Hughes 0–2, Conor McManus 0–1 (0–1f), Stephen O'Hanlon 0–1, Ryan McAnespie 0–1	Report	Oisín Gallen 0–5 (0–3f), Ciarán Thompson 0–3 (0–1f), Daire Ó Baoill 0–3, Conor O'Donnell 0–3, Jamie Brennan 0–2 (0–1f), Shaun Patton 0–1 (0–1f), Caolan McGonagle 0–1, Odhran Doherty 0–1	Stadium: O'Neills Healy Park; Referee: Liam Devenney

==== Knockout stage ====
===== Fixtures =====
24 June 2023 Preliminary quarter-final	Donegal	0–13 – 1–18	Tyrone	Ballybofey
19:00 IST (UTC+1)	Oisín Gallen 0–4 (0–1f), Paddy McBrearty 0–3 (0–2f), Ciarán Thompson 0–2, Shaun Patton 0–1 (0–1 '45), Caolan McColgan 0–1, Odhran Doherty 0–1, Luke McGlynn 0–1	Report	Darren McCurry 0–5 (0–4f), Darragh Canavan 0–5 (0–1f), Ruairí Canavan 1–1, Mattie Donnelly 0–3, Michael McKernan 0–2, Brian Kennedy 0–1, Conn Kilpatrick 0–1	Stadium: MacCumhaill Park; Referee: Conor Lane

===== Bracket =====
Preliminary quarter-finals
Galway	0–12
Mayo	1–10
Kildare	0–13
Monaghan	1–11
Donegal	0–13
Tyrone	1–18
Cork	1–14
Roscommon	0–16

Quarter-finals
Dublin	2–17
Mayo	0–11
Armagh	0–14 (8)
Monaghan	0–14 (9)
Kerry	2–17
Tyrone	0–12
Derry	1–12
Cork	1–8

Semi-finals
Dublin	1–17
Monaghan	0–13
Kerry	1–17
Derry	1–15

Final
Dublin	1–15
Kerry	1–13

== Awards ==
=== GAA.ie Football Team of the Week ===
- 31 January: Caolan McColgan (nominated for, and selected as, Footballer of the Week)
- 27 February: Caolan McColgan
- 22 May: Eoghan Bán Gallagher, Oisín Gallen, Ciarán Thompson; Gallen nominated for Footballer of the Week
- 4 June: Oisín Gallen
- 19 June: Shaun Patton, Brendan McCole; McCole nominated for Footballer of the Week

=== Donegal News Sports Personality of the Month ===
Oisín Gallen: June

=== All Stars ===
Two nominations, for Oisín Gallen and Brendan McCole
