= Ethan O'Donnell =

Donegal Gaelic footballer (born 1997)

Personal information
- Born: 1 January 1997 (age 29)

Sport
- Sport: Gaelic football
- Position: Half-back/Half-forward
Club
- Years: Club
- 201?–: Naomh Conaill
Club titles
- Donegal titles: 6
Inter-county
- Years: County
- 2017–: Donegal

Ethan O'Donnell (born 1 January 1997) is an Irish Gaelic footballer who plays for Naomh Conaill and the Donegal county team.

He played for his county at minor, under-21 and senior level. He can play at half-back or half-forward.

O'Donnell scored the winning point for Donegal against Dublin in the 2014 All-Ireland Minor Football Championship semi-final. Aged 17 and a year younger than many of his teammates, he was used as an impact substitute during that campaign before starting the final against Kerry.

O'Donnell scored a goal in the 2017 Ulster Under-21 Football Championship final victory over Derry, helping Donegal get its first under-21 title since 2010.

O'Donnell was involved with the county senior panel in the 2017 and 2020 seasons but did not play much in either season. He made a substitute appearance for Donegal against Kerry in the opening round of the 2017 National Football League as well as in the last round of the delayed 2020 National Football League, against the same opposition.

The 2021 season marked O'Donnell's breakthrough for his county team. He made a substitute appearance against Tyrone in the opening game of the 2021 National Football League. He also appeared in four of the six other games Donegal played (in a shortened season due to the COVID-19 pandemic). Then an injury to Peadar Mogan gave him the opportunity to play against Dublin in the National Football League semi-final. O'Donnell also started the 2021 Ulster Senior Football Championship quarter-final against Derry.

O'Donnell did not participate in Donegal's 2023 season.

O'Donnell put in a man-of-the-match performance in the final of the 2023 Donegal Senior Football Championship.

After this, O'Donnell based himself in Perth in Western Australia. He flew home especially to play in the 2024 Donegal SFC, but his club lost the final. He flew back from Perth again to play for his club in the 2025 Donegal SFC, when his club won the final, with O'Donnell playing the entirety of that game.
