= Andrew McClean =

Donegal Gaelic footballer

Sport
- Sport: Gaelic football
Club
- Years: Club
- 20??–: Cill Chartha
Club titles
- Donegal titles: 1
College
- Years: College
- IT Sligo
Inter-county
- Years: County
- 2020–: Donegal
- Ulster titles: 1

Andrew McClean is an Irish Gaelic footballer who plays for Cill Chartha and the Donegal county team.

== Playing career ==
=== Club ===
With his club Cill Chartha, McClean won the 2012 Donegal Minor Football Championship.

McClean won the 2017 Donegal Senior Football Championship. It was the first time his club had won the title in 24 years.

He was man of the match in his club's 2019 Donegal Senior Football Championship quarter-final win, scoring a goal and a point from a defensive position. The game was televised live on RTÉ Television.

=== College ===
McClean played Sigerson Cup football for IT Sligo. He received a sports scholarship for the 2020–21 academic year.

=== Inter-county ===
McClean started the 2014 Ulster Minor Football Championship final; however he did not feature in the final of the 2014 All-Ireland Minor Football Championship.

First featuring for his county at senior level under the management of Declan Bonner, McClean was called into the team ahead of the 2020 season. He made a substitute appearance in Donegal's first fixture of the 2020 National Football League against Mayo, during which he scored a point. Further substitute appearances followed in the games against Meath and Galway. He did not feature against Dublin. In the next game, against Monaghan, McClean made another substitute appearance. Then the COVID-19 pandemic brought play to a halt. Play resumed behind closed doors on 18 October with a home game against Tyrone; McClean made a substitute appearance in that game and scored a point. He made his first league start in the last game of the campaign, away to Kerry.

McClean made his first championship start against Tyrone in the 2020 Ulster Senior Football Championship quarter-final. He also appeared as a substitute in the semi-final victory against Armagh and the final against Cavan, in what proved to be the season's concluding game for his team.

Of Donegal's four fixtures of the 2021 National Football League, against Tyrone, Monaghan, Armagh and Dublin respectively, McClean made a substitute appearance only in the first, against Tyrone. He was not part of the panel for the 2022 season.

== Honours ==
Cill Chartha

- Donegal Senior Football Championship: 2017
- Donegal Minor Football Championship: 2012

Donegal

- Ulster Minor Football Championship: 2014
