= Oisín Gallen =

Donegal Gaelic footballer

Personal information
- Nickname: Farrah
- Born: 1999 or 2000 (age 26–27)
- Occupation: Teacher
- Height: 6 ft 0 in (183 cm)

Sport
- Sport: Gaelic football
- Position: Forward
Club
- Years: Club
- 201?–: Seán Mac Cumhaills
Inter-county
- Years: County
- 2019–: Donegal
Inter-county titles
- Ulster titles: 3
- All Stars: 1

Oisín Gallen (born 1999/2000) is an Irish Gaelic footballer who plays for Seán Mac Cumhaills and the Donegal county team. He plays as a forward.

== Playing career ==
=== Club ===
2018 was when Gallen first played for his club in the senior championship.

In the 2023 Donegal Senior Football Championship quarter-final, his club had a surprise 1–17 to 1–14 victory against Glenswilly at O'Donnell Park, a game in which Gallen scored 1–9 of his club's total, and qualified for the competition's semi-final. Gallen was also the competition's top scorer, with 1–56. On 13 December 2023, Gallen was named as the recipient of the annual Gradam Shéamuis Mhic Géidigh.

=== Inter-county ===
Gallen made his inter-county debut in the 2019 Dr McKenna Cup. Not part of the Donegal panel at the start of the 2019 season, he was called up over the course of the McKenna Cup as Donegal were short on numbers. He made his league debut in the third fixture of the 2019 competition against Tipperary, starting and scoring three points (including one free). He again started the fourth fixture and scored a point against Fermanagh. He started the fifth fixture against Armagh. He started and scored another point in the sixth fixture against Cork. He started the seventh fixture against Kildare, scoring four points. Donegal qualified for the National Football League Division 2 final and Gallen started the game and scored four points as Donegal defeated Meath to win the title.

Gallen made his championship debut against Tyrone in the 2019 Ulster Senior Football Championship. He made another substitute appearance against Cavan in the final and scored a point. He later picked up an Ulster medal, his first at any level of play.

In October 2019 (during the Gaelic football off-season), Gallen attended an AFL Draft Combine in Melbourne, Australia. He later explained: "To get away for two weeks to Australia to try out in a professional sport was something I couldn't turn down. It was curiosity more than anything. You want to see what the level there is like and you want to see is there anything you can pick up or learn… I was up against the top young athletes in Australia and there hopefully are things there, standards I can take back home and apply to Gaelic football".

Gallen had surgery on his shoulder in early December 2019, causing him to miss the early part of the 2020 season. He did not feature in any of the first five fixtures in the 2020 National Football League. They were played before the competition was halted in March 2020 due to the COVID-19 pandemic.

When the 2020 National League resumed in October, Gallen started and played 45 minutes of the league game against Tyrone, before being substituted for Andrew McClean. Gallen then played 63 minutes of the game away to Kerry, before being substituted for Conor O'Donnell, on what was the Carndonagh footballer's debut. Gallen then made a substitute appearance against Tyrone in the 2020 Ulster Senior Football Championship quarter-final, scoring one point. He made another substitute appearance against Armagh in the semi-final, again scoring a point. However, Gallen sustained an injury during training ahead of the final and could not play.

Gallen made a substitute appearance in Donegal's opening fixture of the 2021 National Football League, against Tyrone. He started the next game, against Monaghan, scoring three points. Gallen did not feature in the third game against Armagh, though he started the last game against Dublin. He made a substitute appearance against Derry in the 2021 Ulster Senior Football Championship quarter-final. He was named on the bench against Tyrone in the semi-final, but not play in the game.

Gallen appeared as a substitute in the 2022 National Football League fixture against Tyrone but then sustained an injury, missing the 2022 Ulster Senior Football Championship, including the final.

With his playing time often limited by injury in the early years of his career, Gallen started a senior inter-county championship game for the first time against Clare in the 2023 All-Ireland Senior Football Championship. His nine-point tally against Derry's 2022 All Star recipient Chrissy McKaigue in Donegal's next game brought Gallen to national attention. He then scored five points against Monaghan and four points against Tyrone. He scored the first goal in the All Ireland semi-final victory over Meath in 2025.

== Personal life ==
Gallen is from Ballybofey. He teaches at St Aengus' National School in Bridgend.

== Honours ==
Donegal

- Ulster Senior Football Championship: 2019, 2024, 2025
- National Football League Division 2: 2019, 2024

Individual

- All Star: 2024
  - Nominated in 2023
- The Sunday Game Team of the Year: 2024
- Gradam Shéamuis Mhic Géidigh: 2023
- Donegal News Sports Personality winner: June 2023
