= Ciaran Diver =

Donegal Gaelic footballer

Personal information
- Born: 1995/1996
- Occupation: Steel fixer

Sport
- Sport: Gaelic football
Inter-county
- Years: County
- 2019–: Donegal
- Ulster titles: 1

Ciaran Diver (born 1995/1996) is an Irish Gaelic footballer who plays for Moville (Bun an Phobail) and the Donegal county team.

== Playing career ==
He featured for his county during the team's run to the 2014 All-Ireland Minor Football Championship final, and played in that game. The team had earlier won the 2014 Ulster Minor Football Championship. First featuring for his county at senior level under the management of Declan Bonner, Diver was first called up ahead of the 2019 season. He had been playing well for his club before this. He made his inter-county debut in the 2019 Dr McKenna Cup, against Queen's. He went on to play in Division 1 of the National Football League. Diver scored a goal for Donegal against Sligo in 2018. He has been captain of his club.
