= Patrick McBrearty =

Donegal Gaelic footballer (born 1993)

Personal information
- Native name: Pádraig Mac Breartaigh (Irish)
- Nickname: Paddy
- Born: 5 August 1993 (age 33) Dublin, Ireland
- Occupation: Stock trader
- Height: 6 ft 0 in (183 cm)

Sport
- Sport: Gaelic football
- Position: Right corner forward
Club
- Years: Club
- 2010–: Cill Chartha
Club titles
- Donegal titles: 1
Inter-county*
Years	County	Apps (scores)
2011–2025	Donegal	70 (8-179)
Inter-county titles
- Ulster titles: 7
- All-Irelands: 1
- *Inter County team apps and scores correct as of 12:00, 6 December 2025.

Patrick McBrearty (born 5 August 1993) is an Irish Gaelic footballer who plays for Cill Chartha and, previously, for the Donegal county team, which he captained for three years from 2023 until an injury forced his retirement from inter-county football at the end of 2025.

He was usually selected in the full-forward line for his county, often flanking Michael Murphy with Colm McFadden (before Murphy and McFadden's retirements, in, respectively, 2022 and 2016). In 2015, Pat Spillane included McBrearty in his top 40 footballers in the game today.

Among other accolades, he won an All-Ireland Senior Football Championship title (2012), seven Ulster Senior Football Championship titles (2011, 2012, 2014, 2018, 2019, 2024 and 2025) and two International Rules Series (2013, 2015). With his early success (until 2012), McBrearty was believed to be "the most decorated player of his age ever to represent Donegal." He is also part of an exclusive club to have played minor and senior matches for their county on the same day. Indeed, he was the first Ulster footballer since Benny Coulter of Down to play both grades on the one afternoon — Benny is still waiting on that All-Ireland medal after Cork 2010. By 2025, he was recognised as the most decorated player in the history of Donegal.

A major contributor to Donegal teams since his emergence at the start of the first Jim McGuinness managerial era, McBrearty was considered one of the finest young footballers to have arrived on the Donegal scene since Murphy. Opponents highlighted his "ace" attacking abilities and regarded him as a considerable threat. Like Murphy, McBrearty was a live target for Australian Football League recruitment. He turned down such offers as he wished to further his education in Ireland and to spend time with his family.

== Early life ==
McBrearty is a graduate of the Phoenix Elite Academy.

McBrearty was born in Dublin. His father, Seamus, a former centre-forward, who won three Donegal Under-21 Football Championship titles and was a panel member with the 1985 Donegal Senior Football Champions.

His mother, Carol, is a cousin of Tommy Conroy.

His brother, Stephen, has been a teammate for club and county.

== Playing career ==
=== Underage ===
McBrearty used to play association football with St Catherine's — also the hometown club of Everton's Séamus Coleman — and is a close friend of Irish association footballer Carl McHugh, with whom he played for Ireland and went on trial at Celtic. At Celtic he trained alongside the likes of Bobo Baldé and Thomas Gravesen. He has also played soccer for Finn Harps at underage level. He also played underage for his local club Kilcar and has won many titles alongside his brother Stephen.

He also played in the teams that lost to Cavan in the 2013 and 2014 Ulster Under-21 Football Championship finals.

=== Inter-county ===
==== 2011 season ====
"Lads usually aren't ready to take all that [senior football] on now until they're 22 or even 23. They have their strength and conditioning to progress on but there is no doubt Paddy was ready right away. He was already fully filled out… The deceiving thing about Paddy is that he sometimes doesn't look like he's going that fast. But there is serious pace there. And he's aggressive. With that build as well he is difficult to block out or get in the way of. He can win his own ball in front of his man but he is also quick and intelligent enough to make the kind of runs that also eliminate a sweeper. And once he gets on that left foot there is only one thing on his mind. He has serious range as well".

— Colm McFadden on McBrearty

McBrearty was drafted into the senior panel by manager Jim McGuinness in May 2011 ahead of Donegal's opening Ulster Senior Football Championship game against Antrim. He made his senior debut against Antrim as a substitute. He had earlier played for Donegal in the Minor Championship, also against Antrim.

He made his first senior start for Donegal against Cavan at 17 years of age and scored 1–3. His 20th-minute goal was fired first time along the ground into the Cavan net after a pass from Mark McHugh. McGuinness named McBrearty as a late replacement for his clubmate Michael Hegarty in the starting lineup in that game against Cavan.

McBrearty's performances during his debut season at senior inter-county level drew widespread praise, both from local and national media.

==== 2012 season ====
By the age of 18 he had firmly established himself as a member of the Donegal senior team.

After his second Ulster SFC medal in 2012, Jim and Rory reckoned he had trained only about 25 times with the senior team.

In the All-Ireland SFC quarter-final defeat of Kerry at Croke Park on 5 August 2012, Anthony Thompson knocked McBrearty out of the game with his head, causing him concussion.

McBrearty played in the 2012 All-Ireland Senior Football Championship final against Mayo, making a notable contribution in the build-up to Donegal's second goal of the game. His attempt at scoring a point came crashing off the Mayo post after eleven minutes of the match and Mayo's Kevin Keane fumbled, dropping the ball into the path of Colm McFadden who promptly slotted it into the back of the net.

==== Dublin biting incident ====
Against Dublin in the final game of the 2013 National Football League McBrearty sustained a laceration to the shoulder, reported to have been caused by a bite from a Dublin player. The Donegal management team took photographs of the wound, photographs of a wound which appeared to suggest had been caused by the teeth marks of a Dublin opponent. McBrearty was hospitalised after the game to have the wound examined. Accompanied by his parents, he underwent blood tests and was put on a course of antibiotics by concerned medics.

The incident overshadowed the entire game and rocked Dublin's football team, according to media there. Commentators described it as "shameful". However, Dublin County Board chairman Andy Kettle reacted with indifference, rejecting the need for an investigation and complaining instead of "a hard pitch".

The GAA launched a probe into the behaviour of the Dublin players. On 17 April 2013, the Central Competitions Controls Committee (CCCC) cited Kevin O'Brien, the 2012 All-Ireland Under-21 Football Championship-winning captain, for the biting of McBrearty. However, most sources did not immediately name the player. The offence fell under Category III and a three-match ban was proposed, enough to end the player's year if Dublin were to exit the Championship at an early stage.

==== 2013 season ====
Stalked by "bitegate" (see above) since the end of the National League, McBrearty put in a man of the match performance against Tyrone in Donegal's opening game of the Ulster SFC. He played a crucial role in both of Donegal's goals. Colm Cooper collected his award for him from The Sunday Game. His quieter performance in the following game, an Ulster SFC semi-final against Down, was put down to toothache.

==== 2014 season ====
McBrearty received a personal message from US actress Sarah Jessica Parker ahead of the 2014 All-Ireland Senior Football Championship final: "My body is in NYC but my heart is in Donegal. Let's take the All Ireland and Paddy, bring it home to Kilcar. From Sarah Jessica and her son James."

==== 2015 season ====
Under the management of Rory Gallagher, McBrearty started the opening fixture of the 2015 National Football League against Derry and scored 0–5 (two of which were frees) in what was his 46th appearance at the age of 21. He scored 0–4 (including one free) against Dublin in the next game, at Croke Park. He started the third fixture against Cork in Ballyshannon and contributed 0–3 (including one free) to the team's one-point victory. He started the fourth fixture against Monaghan and scored a point from a free. He started the fifth fixture against Kerry at Austin Stack Park and contributed 0–4. He started the sixth fixture against Tyrone and scored 0–1 (from a free). He started the seventh fixture against Mayo and scored 1–3 (including one free). Donegal qualified for the NFL semi-final. McBrearty started and scored 0–4.

McBrearty started the 2015 Ulster Senior Football Championship final, scoring 0–6 (four of which were frees). He had previously started the preliminary round against Tyrone (scoring 0–2), the quarter-final against Armagh (scoring 1–1) and the semi-final against Derry (scoring 0–2, one of which was a free). McBrearty scored 1–1 in the 2015 All-Ireland Senior Football Championship qualifier defeat of Galway at Croke Park and started the next game against Mayo at the same venue.

==== 2016 season ====
McBrearty started the opening fixture of the 2016 National Football League away to Down and scored 1–3 (two of which were frees). He started the second fixture against Cork, a ten-point win in Ballyshannon, contributing 0–4 (including two frees) to the team's victory. He started the third fixture against Mayo and scored 0–4 (three of which were frees). He started the fourth fixture, away to Kerry at Austin Stack Park, and scored 0–3 (all of which were frees). He started the fifth fixture against Roscommon and scored 0–6 (all frees). He started the sixth fixture away to Dublin at Croke Park and scored 0–3 (including one free). He started the seventh fixture away to Monaghan in Castleblayney and scored 0–2 (including one free). Donegal qualified for the NFL semi-final. McBrearty also started this game, scoring 0–8 (five of which were frees).

McBrearty started the 2016 Ulster Senior Football Championship final, scoring 0–3 (two of which were frees). He had previously started the quarter-final against Fermanagh (scoring 0–3, including one free), the semi-final against Monaghan (scoring 0–5 (three of which were frees) and the semi-final replay against the same opposition (scoring 0–4).

McBrearty scored eleven points in Donegal's 2016 All-Ireland Senior Football Championship victory over Cork at Croke Park. McBrearty's eleven-point tally went down as the highest total of individual scores recorded by a Donegal player in the same game; Michael McLoone (1966) and Seamus Bonner (1974) jointly hold the record for highest score in the same match. The Irish Times described McBrearty's display as "stunning" and noted that he had helped Donegal become the first Ulster team to reach six consecutive All-Ireland quarter-finals, a record previously only reached by Kerry, Dublin and Cork. He scored 0–3 (two of which were frees) in that quarter-final.

==== 2017 season ====
McBrearty started the opening fixture of the 2017 National Football League against Kerry and scored 0–4 (three of which were frees). He started the second fixture away to Roscommon, contributing 0–2 (one of which was a free) to the team's victory. He made a second-half substitute appearance against Monaghan in the sixth fixture and scored 0–2. He made another substitute appearance in the seventh fixture against Mayo.

McBrearty made a second-half substitute appearance in the 2017 Ulster Senior Football Championship quarter-final victory against Antrim and scored 1–2 (both points were frees). He started the semi-final loss to Tyrone and scored 0–6 (including four frees). He started the 2017 All-Ireland Senior Football Championship qualifier defeat of Meath at Páirc Tailteann and scored 0-7 (three of which were frees). He then started the qualifier loss to Galway at Markievicz Park and scored 0–6 (two of which were frees).

McBrearty captained his club to the 2017 Donegal Senior Football Championship, scoring three points in the final. It was the first time his club had won the title in 24 years, having been defeated by Glenswilly at the same stage the previous year.

==== 2018 season ====
Under the management of Declan Bonner, McBrearty started the opening fixture of the 2018 National Football League against Kerry in Killarney, scoring 0–10 (eight of which were frees). He scored 0–9 (including six frees) in the next game against Galway. He scored 0–7 (four of which were frees) against Dublin. He scored 0–4 (including one free) against Kildare. He missed the matches against Tyrone and Monaghan. He then started against Mayo and scored 0–4 (two of which were frees).

In the 2018 Ulster Senior Football Championship, McBrearty scored eight points (six from play) as Donegal overcame Derry in their quarter-final encounter. He then scored six points in the semi-final victory over Down. In the final against Fermanagh, McBrearty was substituted in the 38th minute; it later emerged that he had suffered a cruciate ligament injury in the first half and this injury caused him to miss the rest of the season. He still managed to score a point for his team in the final match.

==== 2019 season ====
McBrearty did not play a minute of the 2019 National Football League. This included missing Donegal's victory over Meath in the Division 2 final.

In the 2019 Ulster Senior Football Championship, McBrearty scored five points (two from play) as Donegal overcame Fermanagh in their quarter-final encounter. He scored three points (two from play) in the semi-final victory over Tyrone. In the final against Cavan, McBrearty scored five points (four from play) as Donegal claimed that season's provincial championship.

McBrearty made his 100th appearance for Donegal against Meath in the 2019 All-Ireland Senior Football Championship quarter-final. He scored 1–6.

==== 2020 season ====
Post-COVID disruption, play resumed behind closed doors on 18 October, McBrearty sustained an injury during a challenge match against Roscommon which left him unable to play in the remaining league games against Tyrone and Kerry in October 2020.

Sub versus Armagh in Ulster SFC semi and scored a point.

==== 2023–2025: Donegal captaincy and retirement ====
In January 2023, McBrearty was appointed captain of the Donegal senior team ahead of the 2023 season.

He retired from inter-county football in December 2025. His former manager Declan Bonner described him as "a man who helped set high standards in training".

=== International rules ===
McBrearty was called up for Ireland ahead of the 2013 & 2015 International Rules Series against Australia. He started the first Test at Breffni Park, then came on in the second Test at Croke Park to smash home the goal of that game, as Ireland romped to a record-breaking victory.

== Personal life ==
McBrearty is a former employee of construction recruitment firm, 3D Personnel. A 2015 survey — conducted among U.S. women with little or no knowledge of Gaelic games — ranked McBrearty as the seventh sexiest GAA player, second in Ulster and top in Donegal.

== Career statistics ==
As of match played 30 June 2024

Team	Year	National League			Ulster		All-Ireland		Total	
Team	Year	Division	Apps	Score	Apps	Score	Apps	Score	Apps	Score
Donegal	2011	Division 2			4	1–4	2	0–1	6	1–5
Donegal	2012	Division 1			4	0–4	3	0–1	7	0–5
Donegal	2013	Division 1			3	0–3	2	0–3	5	0–6
Donegal	2014	Division 1			3	0–4	3	0–6	6	0–10
Donegal	2015	Division 1			4	1–11	2	1–1	6	2–12
Donegal	2016	Division 1			4	0–15	2	0–14	6	0–29
Donegal	2017	Division 1			2	1–8	1	0–6	3	1–14
Donegal	2018	Division 1			4	0–19	—		4	0–19
Donegal	2019	Division 2			3	0–13	3	1–13	6	1–26
Donegal	2020	Division 1			2	0–5	—		2	0–5
Donegal	2021	Division 1 North			3	1–12	—		3	1–12
Donegal	2022	Division 1			3	2–8	1	0–1	4	2–9
Donegal	2023	Division 1					3	0–4	3	0–4
Donegal	2024	Division 2			3	0-05	4	0-15	7	0-20
Career total					42	6–111	26	2–65	68	8–176

== Honours ==
Donegal

- All-Ireland Senior Football Championship: 2012
- Ulster Senior Football Championship: 2011, 2012, 2014, 2018, 2019, 2024 (c), 2025 (c)

College

- Ulster Vocational Schools: 2011, 2012
- All-Ireland Vocational Schools: 2011

Country

- International Rules Series: 2013, 2015

Club

- Donegal Senior Football Championship: 2017

Individual

- Ulster Young Footballer of the Year Awards: 2011, 2012
- Ulster GAA Writers Association (UGAAWA) Cormac McAnallen Young Achiever: 2011, 2012
- Donegal Footballer of the Year: 2017

Sporting positions
Preceded by Michael Murphy	Donegal Senior Football Captain; 2023–2025	Succeeded by TBD
