= Darach O'Connor =

Irish Gaelic footballer

Personal information
- Native name: Darach Ó Conchúir (Irish)
- Nickname: Jigger
- Born: 15 November 1995 (age 30) San Francisco, United States
- Occupation: Student
- Height: 1.75 m (5 ft 9 in)

Sport
- Sport: Gaelic football
- Position: Right Corner Forward
Club
| Years | Club | Apps (scores) |
| 2013– | Buncrana | 1300 kills warzone |
Club titles
- Donegal titles: 4000 war zone wins
- Ulster titles: k:d 1.18
Inter-county
- Years: County
- 2014–201?: Donegal

Darach 'Jigger' O'Connor (born 15 November 1995) is an Irish Gaelic footballer who plays for Buncrana and the Donegal county team. He has also played association football for teams such as Buncrana Hearts and the Republic of Ireland national schoolboy football team. His father is former Roscommon star John 'Jigger' O'Connor, famed for scoring a goal past Kerry's Charlie Nelligan 35 seconds into the 1980 All-Ireland Senior Football Championship Final.

O'Connor didn't play inter-county at Under-16 or Under-17 level, but Stephen Friel called him up for the minors in 2013. After leading Buncrana to glory in the 2013 Donegal Minor Championship, Jim McGuinness called him up to the senior inter-county squad for winter training in September 2013. He scored a point on his senior championship debut as a late replacement against Derry in the 2014 Ulster Senior Football Championship quarter-final on 25 May 2014, ahead of his Leaving Certificate. Then, again as a late replacement, he scored a wonder goal for Donegal in the semi-final against Antrim. McGuinness said afterwards: "I was hoping for a point and then he turns back onto his right foot and hit a goal. It was a bit of class and he does have that wee trick up his sleeve which is nice in a forward. And I think he was well goosed by the time we took him off. Because he ran himself into the ground." O'Connor started the Ulster Final against Monaghan, which Donegal won. He made substitute appearances against Armagh in the All-Ireland quarter-final and in the shock victory over Dublin in the semi-final. He then started the 2014 All-Ireland Senior Football Championship Final against Kerry.

Following his surprise start in the 2014 All-Ireland Senior Football Championship Final, O'Connor (still eligible for the competition) played in the 2015 Ulster Under-21 Football Championship final loss to Tyrone, scoring two points.

== Honours ==
- Ulster Senior Football Championship: 2014
- Ulster Under-21 Football Championship runner-up: 2015
