= Jason McGee =

Irish Gaelic footballer (born 1997/98)

Personal information
- Native name: Jason Mac Aoidh (Irish)
- Born: 1997 or 1998 (age 28–29)
- Occupation: Student
- Height: 6 ft 5 in (196 cm)

Sport
- Sport: Gaelic football
- Position: Midfield
Club
- Years: Club
- 201?–: Cloich Cheann Fhaola
Inter-county
- Years: County
- 2017–: Donegal
- Ulster titles: 3

Jason McGee (born 1997/8) is an Irish Gaelic footballer who plays for Cloich Cheann Fhaola and the Donegal county team.

He is a former Australian rules football trialist.

== Playing career ==
=== Minor ===
McGee has an Ulster Minor Football Championship medal. He was part of the team that reached the 2016 All-Ireland Minor Football Championship semi-final.

McGee was joint-captain of the Donegal minor team with Niall O'Donnell.

=== Senior ===
McGee made his senior debut for Donegal against Kerry in the opening fixture of the 2017 National Football League. He also started against Roscommon in the second round of fixtures. He scored 1–1 against Dublin in the third round of fixtures, including the opening point of the game and a goal late in the first half; after he had the first shot at Stephen Cluxton, Jamie Brennan took the rebound and McGee eventually scored with the third strike. He started the next game against Cavan. He then did not feature until the last game against Mayo, which he also started, missing the games against Tyrone and Monaghan before this.

McGee made his championship debut from the start against Antrim in the 2017 Ulster Senior Football Championship quarter-final. He then started the semi-final loss to Tyrone. He started the 2017 All-Ireland Senior Football Championship qualifier defeat of Meath at Páirc Tailteann and scored 0–2. He then started the qualifier loss to Galway at Markievicz Park.

Under the management of Declan Bonner, McGee made a substitute appearance in the opening fixture of the 2018 National Football League against Kerry in Killarney.

He did not feature on the pitch when Donegal won the 2018 Ulster Senior Football Championship, as, alongside Niall O'Donnell, he had decided to drop down to play with the under-20 team instead.

McGee scored three points against Clare in the opening fixture of the 2019 National Football League in Ennis. He made a substitute appearance in the next fixture against Meath, He started the third fixture against Tipperary. He started and scored two points in the fourth fixture against Fermanagh. He started the fifth fixture against Armagh. He started the seventh fixture against Kildare, scoring two points. Donegal qualified for the National Football League Division 2 final and McGee started the game and scored two points as Donegal defeated Meath to win the title.

McGee started each game of the 2019 Ulster Senior Football Championship, as Donegal defeated Fermanagh in the quarter-final, Tyrone in the semi-final and Cavan in the final (McGee scored a point in the quarter-final and two points in the final).

McGee had hip surgery in Coventry, England, on 28 November 2019, causing him to miss the opening part of the 2020 season including, it was expected, all games until the 2020 Ulster Senior Football Championship, scheduled for May. Then the COVID-19 pandemic brought play to a halt in March during the 2020 National Football League. Play resumed behind closed doors on 18 October with a home game against Tyrone; McGee made a substitute appearance in that game. Then he started the last league game away to Kerry, scoring two points. McGee made a late substitute appearance in the 2020 Ulster Senior Football Championship quarter-final victory against Tyrone. He also made substitute appearances in the semi-final victory against Armagh and in the final against Cavan, in what proved to be the season's concluding game for his team.

McGee appeared as an early blood substitute for Hugh McFadden in Donegal's opening fixture of the 2021 National Football League against Tyrone. He also made substitute appearances in the remaining three fixtures, against Monaghan, Armagh and Dublin respectively. He did not play in the 2021 Ulster Senior Football Championship.

McGee made a substitute appearance for Ciarán Thompson after ten minutes in Donegal's opening fixture of the 2022 National Football League against Mayo at Markievicz Park. He then started the next three fixture against Kildare, Kerry and Tyrone, scoring a point each against Kildare and Tyrone. He also started the next game, against Monaghan, and scored a point from a mark. He started against Dublin but did not score, then started against Armagh and scored an early goal in the last league game of the season. In the 2022 Ulster Senior Football Championship, McGee started each of Donegal's three fixtures, scoring a point in the quarter-final against Armagh then not scoring in the semi-final against Cavan. He scored two points in the final against Derry but his team lost that game after extra-time. He also started the 2022 All-Ireland Senior Football Championship qualifier loss to Armagh, scoring a point.

Apart from his hip, McGee has also been troubled by hamstring and back injuries during his senior career.

== Honours ==
- Ulster Senior Football Championship: 2019, 2024, 2025
- National Football League Division 2: 2019, 2024
- Ulster Minor Football Championship:
