= Rory Gallagher (Gaelic footballer) =

Irish Gaelic footballer and manager

Personal information
- Born: 22 August 1978 (age 48) Belleek, Northern Ireland
- Occupations: Retail manager (former); Employee of construction recruitment firm
- Height: 1.83 m (6 ft 0 in)

Sport
- Sport: Gaelic football
- Position: Full forward
Clubs
- Years: Club
- Erne Gaels; St Brigid's; Crosserlough; St Gall's
Club titles
- Fermanagh titles: 2 (1 each St Gall's/St Brigid's)
- Ulster titles: 2 (1 each St Gall's/St Brigid's)
- All-Ireland Titles: 1 (St Gall's)
Inter-county
- Years: County
- 1998–2005 2007: Fermanagh; Cavan

Rory Gallagher (born 22 August 1978) is a Gaelic football manager and former player.

Gallagher played for the Fermanagh and Cavan county teams, as well as several club teams, including his home club Erne Gaels, as well as Dublin side St Brigid's and Antrim's St Gall's. He was a selector for the Donegal county team during their 2012 Championship success, acting as number two to Jim McGuinness. He left the Donegal panel after the 2013 championship but later returned as Jim McGuinness's successor in October 2014, when McGuinness departed following the 2014 All-Ireland Senior Football Championship final. With John McNulty, he was joint manager of the Cill Chartha club in 2014 during his time away from the county panel.

== Playing career ==
He had trials with English professional association football clubs Manchester United and Blackburn Rovers.

He broke his leg in October 1993.

He is a cousin of fellow Fermanagh footballer Raymond Gallagher.

=== Club ===
Gallagher won the Antrim Senior Football Championship and the Ulster Senior Club Football Championship with St Gall's in 2009 and added the All-Ireland Senior Club Football Championship in 2010. He won the Dublin Senior Football Championship and the Leinster Senior Club Football Championship with St Brigid's in 2003.

=== Inter-county ===
Gallagher played for both Fermanagh and Cavan.

Gallagher was top scorer in the Ulster Senior Football Championship for three consecutive years: in 2000 (1-19), 2001 (0-16) and 2002 (4-12). In 2002, he scored 3–09 in an Ulster Senior Football Championship game against Monaghan. This equalled the record for the highest individual scorer in any championship football match set by Dublin's Johnny Joyce in 1960; Gallagher and Joyce held the joint record for eighteen years until Cillian O'Connor's four goals (accompanied by nine points) in the 2020 All-Ireland Senior Football Championship semi-final at Croke Park broke it.

He left the Fermanagh panel in 2002. but briefly returned to the Fermanagh setup in 2010. Gallagher was unimpressed with the appointment of John O'Neill as county manager.

== Managerial career ==
=== Selector: Donegal ===
In 2011, Gallagher joined the Donegal senior football team as a selector. As soon as he joined he knew all the players' names. Jim McGuinness had originally recruited Peter McGinley but he had work commitments and spoke of Gallagher as an impressive coach. Martin McHugh also thinks highly of him. McGuinness decided to call upon Gallagher. Since his arrival McGuinness's team have twice won Ulster and in 2012 they got their hands on Sam the man himself. This led the people of Donegal to look upon Gallagher with awe and reverence and as a kind of demi-god to Jim's Messiah, though this was not in evidence when McGuinness departed and Gallagher took over.

He resigned as a selector in 2013. He was then linked with the vacant Fermanagh and Antrim jobs but settled instead for Donegal Under-21s assistant manager under Maxi Curran. After his departure from the Donegal senior team, fellow McGuinness underling Curran, who also sacrificed himself, said: "I think that Rory made an enormous contribution to Donegal's success as a tactician, coach, motivator and diplomat. He did not spare himself in bringing Donegal right up to the top [...] I cannot speak highly enough of him and I consider it an honour and a privilege to have worked alongside him. He will undoubtedly be a massive asset to any club or county side fortunate enough to engage his services."

After Gallagher left the Donegal panel in 2013, he became joint manager of Cill Chartha with John McNulty.

=== Manager: Donegal ===
After the departure of Jim McGuinness. Gallagher and former Mayo manager James Horan were rumoured as the most likely replacements until Horan announced he was not interested in the job. This left Gallagher as the most likely candidate. Gallagher was appointed the new manager of the Donegal senior football team in October 2014.

Gallagher made his competitive managerial debut for Donegal in the National Football League Division 1 win against Derry with a score of 1-15 0–12. His second game ended in a defeat against Dublin losing 2-10 0–11. His third game ended with a marginal win against Cork with a scoreline of 0-12 1-08. Donegal's next meeting came against Monaghan resulting in a defeat of 1-04 0-09. Another win followed against Tyrone in a 1-13 0–06 scoreline. In the final round Donegal drew with Mayo 0-12 1-09 but made it through to the semi-final on points difference but lost to Cork in a scoreline of 4-11 0–19.

Gallagher's championship debut soon followed, with Donegal meeting Tyrone in the preliminary round with the winner facing Armagh. Donegal overcame Tyrone in Ballybofey with a win of 1-13 1–10. Donegal later faced Kieran McGeeney's Armagh in what was expected to be a tough match following the previous year's meeting in the All-Ireland SFC quarter-final where Donegal snatched a victory 2 minutes from time winning by a point in a tense game that was going either way. However, it was not the case this time as Gallagher's men eased their way to victory with a 0-08 2–11 win, allowing Donegal to progress to the semi-final to meet Derry, whom they beat 0-10 1–09 in Clones to make Gallagher's first Ulster SFC final as manager and Donegal's fifth successive final, which resulted in a narrow defeat to Monaghan by a score line of 0-11 0–10. Thus, Gallagher's first season lost Donegal their Ulster crown.

As a result of Donegal losing in the Ulster SFC final, Gallagher's men met Galway on 1 August 2015 at Croke Park in the last round of the All-Ireland Qualifiers. Donegal defeated Galway in a scoreline of 3-12 0-11 setting up a meeting with Connacht Champions Mayo in the All-Ireland SFC quarter-final, which resulted in defeat for Donegal by a 2-13 0–11 scoreline bringing an end to their 2015 Championship campaign.

More mediocrity followed in 2016. Two injury time points in the Ulster SFC final handed Tyrone their first provincial title since 2010. Leinster and All-Ireland champions Dublin were the opponents in the All-Ireland quarter-final. Dublin avenged their famous defeat in the 2014 semi-final (achieved by McGuinness after Gallagher's departure from his backroom team).

A 2017 Ulster Senior Football Championship semi-final capitulation to Tyrone and 2017 All-Ireland Senior Football Championship exit to Galway at Markievicz Park achieved a new low for a decade that had started so well and Gallagher was gone.

Gallagher stepped down as Donegal senior football manager on 31 July 2017.

=== Fermanagh ===
Gallagher was appointed senior manager of the Fermanagh county team on 11 September 2017. He could only bring them as far as the 2018 Ulster Senior Football Championship final against his former side, Donegal. Despite his background knowledge of the Donegal team, Donegal strolled to victory with ease. Eight points down by the 31st minute of the first half, Fermanagh had to deploy a hastily cobbled together Plan B, but to little effect, though they made it to half-time with just the eight-point difference. A disallowed second-half Donegal goal for a square ball infringement had little effect as Donegal ran out winners by a double score.

Gallagher left Fermanagh in 2019.

=== Derry ===
Gallagher was soon appointed senior manager of the Derry county team, with the board praising him as a "top rank professional manager".

Under Gallagher, Derry won the 2022 Ulster Senior Football Championship against his former team Donegal in extra time 1:14 to 1:16.

In May 2023, Gallagher "stepped back" as senior manager of Derry less than two days before the final of the 2023 Ulster Senior Football Championship, following allegations of domestic violence made on social media by his estranged wife, Nicola.

On 16 May 2023, he resigned as manager of Derry.

In August 2023, it emerged that he was being investigated by the sports body.

Following his successor Mickey Harte's departure as Derry manager after one season, Gallagher released a statement expressing his intent to make a return as an inter-county manager. A spokesman for Derry GAA responded by saying they would not be reappointing Gallagher.

=== After Derry ===
In January 2025, Naas GAA announced Gallagher would begin working as a coach for it, working under senior team manager Joe Murphy. However, after Gaelic Athletic Association president Jarlath Burns sent an email to Naas GAA expressing concern about Gallagher's appointment, the offer was withdrawn.

In February 2025, the Irish Examiner confirmed that Gallagher would begin working as a coach with Down GAA club Kilcoo. However, the club then distanced itself from Rory Gallagher and publicly denied Rory Gallagher would become its manager.

== Personal life ==
As of 2021, he was an employee of construction recruitment firm, 3D Personnel, based between their Dublin and Belfast offices.
