= Jamie Brennan =

Irish Gaelic footballer

Personal information
- Native name: Jamie Ó Braonáin (Irish)
- Born: 1996 (age 29–30)
- Occupation: Teacher
- Height: 5 ft 10 in (178 cm)

Sport
- Sport: Gaelic football
- Position: Forward
Clubs
- Years: Club
- 2013–: Réalt na Mara (F); Aodh Ruadh (H)
Inter-county
- Years: County
- 2017–: Donegal
- Ulster titles: 4

Jamie Brennan (born 1996) is an Irish Gaelic footballer and hurler who plays football for Réalt na Mara and the Donegal county team, and has hurled for Aodh Ruadh.

== Family and education ==
His mother Jacinta 'Jess' is a native of County Sligo. His father Noel is from Bundoran County Donegal . He is not related to Paul, with whom he has lined out for club and county.

Brennan has completed a degree in human nutrition at Institute of Technology, Sligo. He initially studied in Galway but moved to Sligo so as to be nearer Donegal, and financed his studies by working in Bundoran's Great Northern Hotel.

== Playing career ==
=== Youth ===
Brian McEniff, a Bundoran local, first encountered Brennan while coaching an under-12 side. Brennan, nine and skinny at the time, joined in and — in spite of McEniff's reservations — Donegal's All-Ireland Senior Football Championship winning manager from 1992 was surprised to find someone of this age to possess such speed and skill as he observed being displayed by Brennan. McEniff later recalled how — though only aged nine — he recognised Brennan as "a special talent".

Brennan was a dual player for his county at minor level by the age of 17. However, he had to play hurling with Aodh Ruadh in Ballyshannon as Réalt na Mara did not offer the sport. At the same age he was a single figure handicap golfer at Bundoran Golf Club (see List of links golf courses#Ireland — "North West" section).

Brennan also played association football at youth level with Erne Wanderers, whose coach described him as: "Naturally gifted… there was no coaching in him at all… one of the best finishers I've ever coached". Several League of Ireland clubs — among them Derry City, Finn Harps and Sligo Rovers — expressed interest.

Brennan watched on from Hill 16 as Donegal won the 2012 All-Ireland Senior Football Championship Final, while he was part of the minor side that preceded the 2014 All-Ireland Senior Football Championship Final which Donegal also contested.

=== Club ===
Brennan won the Donegal Intermediate Football Championship with Réalt na Mara in 2015, setting up the first goal and scoring the second of his team's four goals in the final before being substituted in the first half after sustaining a hamstring injury.

He had scored a goal in the quarter-final win over Naomh Bríd and was also central to the club's semi-final defeat of Aodh Ruadh.

=== Inter-county ===
==== Minor ====
Brennan, playing under his future senior manager Declan Bonner, won the 2014 Ulster Minor Football Championship title with Donegal, scoring a late fisted goal and two points in the final against Armagh. He also played in Donegal's four-point All-Ireland minor final defeat to Kerry at Croke Park in 2014, scoring a point and also a goal at a critical stage in the game.

==== Under-21 ====
Brennan won an Ulster Under-21 Football Championship with Donegal in 2017. He set up an important goal for Lorcan Connor to finish in the final against Derry, dribbling the ball in a soccer-style run towards the opposing goalkeeper. Brennan explained his thought process at the time as critical to the creation of the move: "There was a kick-out and it bounced once and I flicked it on, and everything opened up. I could feel the boy up me hole so I booted it on, took a big touch and flew on, and I didn't know if he was still behind me. So I said 'if I pick this up, I'm going to fall straight on my face', so I kept going and then I was in on the goalie, nearly one-on-one, so a man came to me so I side-footed it over to Lorcan and he had an open net".

==== Senior ====
Brennan first featured for his county at senior level under the management of Rory Gallagher. He made his first league start for Donegal against Kerry in the opening round of the 2017 National Football League. He made his championship debut against Antrim later that year. He scored a goal and a point.

Noted for his direct pace, Brennan himself has noted that he arrived into the team as very light in weight, was initially reluctant to participate in gym sessions due to his concerns about it causing him to lose his speed but — having had the science of it explained to him — he began and found it did not limit his pace.

With his former minor manager Declan Bonner succeeding Gallagher in late 2017, Brennan continued to prosper. He scored a goal after 28 minutes against Monaghan during the 2018 National Football League fixture at St Tiernach's Park in Clones, as well as two points in the same game.

Brennan started and scored a point in the final as Donegal won the 2018 Ulster Senior Football Championship. He had started all his team's earlier championship matches that year, scoring two points in the preliminary round against Cavan, one point in the quarter-final against Derry and a goal and three points in the semi-final against Down.

Brennan scored a vital three points from play as Donegal won by the same score in their opening fixture of the 2019 National Football League against Clare at Cusack Park in Ennis. In Donegal's league meeting with Cork at Páirc Uí Rinn, Brennan scored a goal and two points. In their next league game, against Kildare, Brennan scored a goal and a point. This earned Donegal promotion to the top flight and, in the National Football League Division 2 Final against Meath at Croke Park, Brennan scored a further two points and another crucial goal that gave him team the lead for the first time; the game ended in a two-point win for Donegal.

Brennan started the final of the 2019 Ulster Senior Football Championship, which Donegal also won with Brennan's contributions including four points and a solo goal after a long run through the Cavan defence, momentarily appearing to lose the ball, only to boot it back past the goalkeeper and into the net. He also scored four points (including his team's crucial opening score) against Fermanagh in the quarter-final, then scored four points, a fourth minute goal and hit the post in his team's semi-final win over Tyrone.

After the 2019 Ulster final defeat of Cavan, the team watched their win over the same side from 2018. Patrick McBrearty noted Brennan's bulkier physique in 2019.

== Kicking style ==
Brennan uses noticeably little back lift when kicking the ball. He says it is not a technique he practises.

== Honours ==
Donegal

- Ulster Senior Football Championship: 2018, 2019, 2024, 2025
- National Football League Division 2: 2019, 2024
- Ulster Under-21 Football Championship: 2017
- All-Ireland Minor Football Championship runner-up: 2014
- Ulster Minor Football Championship: 2014

Réalt na Mara

- Donegal Intermediate Football Championship: 2015

Individual

- All Star: 0
  - Nominated in 2019
- GAA/GPA All Stars Player of the Month: June 2019
- GAA.ie Footballer of the Week: June 2019
