= Paul McGonigle =

Donegal Gaelic footballer

Personal information
- Born: 1973 or 1974 (age 52–53)
- Occupation: Accountant

Sport
- Sport: Gaelic football
Club
- Years: Club
- 19??–: Buncrana
Inter-county
Years	County	Apps (scores)
2000–2004	Donegal	44

Paul McGonigle (born 1973/4) is an Irish Gaelic football coach, manager and player for Buncrana and, formerly, the Donegal county team. He served as assistant manager of the county team during Declan Bonner's second spell as manager.

== Career ==
McGonigle played at midfield and half-forward for his county. He made 44 appearances for the team.

McGonigle started against Armagh in the 2002 Ulster Senior Football Championship final. The following year he started the All-Ireland Senior Football Championship semi-final, during which he was substituted for Jim McGuinness. He also played in the 2004 Ulster SFC final.

McGonigle has been manager of his club, as well as chairman.

In September 2013, county manager Jim McGuinness parted ways with his backroom team. Shortly afterwards, McGuinness announced McGonigle as part of his new backroom team.

When McGuinness departed after the 2014 All-Ireland Senior Football Championship final, McGonigle was linked with the managerial vacancy.

When Declan Bonner became manager in September 2017, McGonigle was appointed as his assistant manager.
