= Peadar Mogan =

Gaelic footballer

Personal information
- Born: January 1999 (age 27) Letterkenny, Ireland
- Occupation: Secondary School Teacher
- Height: 1.78 m (5 ft 10 in)

Sport
- Sport: Gaelic Football
- Position: Left half-back
Club
- Years: Club
- 2017–: St Naul
Inter-county
- Years: County
- 2020–: Donegal
Inter-county titles
- Ulster titles: 2
- All-Irelands: 0
- NFL: 1
- All Stars: 1

Peadar Mogan is a Gaelic footballer playing for St Naul and Donegal. He won an All Star in 2024, having previously been nominated for one in 2020. Mogan won an Ulster title in 2024, scoring 2 points in the final. He added another Ulster title in 2025, scoring 1 point in the final.

He is a wing-back and would have watched Donegal the first time round under McGuinness, attending the 2011 quarter-final victory over Kildare at Croke Park and he found himself involved as a player the second time round

He is a teacher

== Honours ==
Donegal

- Ulster Senior Football Championship: 2024, 2025
- National Football League Division 2: 2024

Individual

- All Star (1): 2024
  - Nominated in 2020, 2025
- The Sunday Game Team of the Year: 2024
