= 2022 Ulster Senior Football Championship =

Association football tournament

2022 Ulster SFC
Tournament details
- Province: Ulster
- Year: 2022
- Trophy: Anglo-Celt Cup

Winners
- Champions: Derry (8th win)
- Manager: Rory Gallagher
- Captain: Chrissy McKaigue

Runners-up
- Runners-up: Donegal
- Manager: Declan Bonner
- Captain: Michael Murphy

The 2022 Ulster Senior Football Championship is the 134th installment of the annual Ulster Senior Football Championship organised by Ulster GAA. It is one of the four provincial competitions of the 2022 All-Ireland Senior Football Championship. The winners receive the Anglo-Celt Cup. The draw for the 2022 Ulster Championship was made on 28 November 2021.

== Teams ==
The Ulster championship is contested by the nine county teams in the province of Ulster.

| Team | Colours | Sponsor | Manager | Captain | Most recent success |
| Team | Colours | Sponsor | Manager | Captain | All-Ireland | Provincial |
|---|---|---|---|---|---|---|
| Antrim | Saffron and white | Fona Cab | Enda McGinley | Peter Healy | | 1951 |
| Armagh | Orange and white | Simply Fruit | Kieran McGeeney | Aidan Nugent/Rian O'Neill | 2002 | 2008 |
| Cavan | Royal blue and white | Kingspan Group | Mickey Graham | Raymond Galligan | 1952 | 2020 |
| Derry | Red and white | Errigal Contracts | Rory Gallagher | Chrissy McKaigue | 1993 | 1998 |
| Donegal | Gold and green | Circet | Declan Bonner | Michael Murphy | 2012 | 2019 |
| Down | Red and black | EOS IT Solutions | James McCartan | Darren O'Hagan | 1994 | 1994 |
| Fermanagh | Green and white | Tracey Concrete | Kieran Donnelly | Declan McCusker |
| Monaghan | White and blue | All-Boro | Séamus "Banty" McEnaney | Ryan Wylie | | 2015 |
| Tyrone | White and Red | McAleer & Rushe | Feargal Logan; Brian Dooher | Pádraig Hampsey | 2021 | 2021 |

== Championship draw ==
Preliminary round 16 April
Fermanagh | 2–10
Tyrone | 2–17

Quarter-finals; 23/24/30 April, 1 May
Donegal | 1–16
Armagh | 0–12
Antrim | 0–10
Cavan | 1–20
Monaghan | 0–23
Down | 2–7
Tyrone | 0–10
Derry | 1–18

Semi-finals; 8/15 May
Donegal | 2–16
Cavan | 0–16
Derry | 3–12
Monaghan | 0–17

Final; 29 May
Donegal | 1–14
Derry | 1–16

== Preliminary round ==
Two counties were randomly drawn to face each other in the preliminary round. The lowest ranked county to play in the preliminary round was Fermanagh of Division 3.

16 April 2022
18:30
Preliminary round

| Fermanagh (3) | 2-10 - 2-17 | Tyrone (1) |
|---|---|---|
| Conall Jones 1-1, Josh Largo-Ellis 1-0, Sean Quigley (0-2f, 1 '45) & Ryan Lyons (0-2f) 0-3 each, James McMahon, Darragh McGurn & Garvan Jones (0-1f) 0-1 each | Report | Darren McCurry 0-6 (0-2f, 0-2m), Cathal McShane 0-3 (0-2f), Conor Meyler & Liam Rafferty 1-0 each, Conor McKenna 0-2, Darragh Canavan, Niall Sludden, Conn Kilpatrick, Kieran McGeary, Michael Conroy & Brian Kennedy (0-1m) 0-1 each |

Brewster Park, Enniskillen
Attendance: 7,839
Referee: Joe McQuillan (Cavan)

== Quarter-finals ==
Seven counties were given a bye to this stage and were joined by the preliminary round's winning team. The lowest ranked counties to play in the quarter-finals were Antrim, Cavan and Down of Division 3.

23 April 2022
14:00
Quarter-final

| Antrim (3) | 0-10 - 1-20 | Cavan (3) |
|---|---|---|
| Ryan Murray 0-3, Michael McCann, Kevin Small, Dermot McAleese, Paddy McAleer, Conor Stewart, Conor Murray (0-1f) & Jamie Gribbin (0-1f) 0-1 each | Report | Paddy Lynch 0-8 (0-5f, 0-1m), Gearóid McKiernan 1-2 (0-1f), Gerard Smith 0-3, Martin Reilly 0-2, James Smith, Padraig Faulkner, Jason McLoughlin, Cormac O'Reilly & Raymond Galligan (0-1f) 0-1 each |

Corrigan Park, Belfast
Referee: Jerome Henry (Mayo)
24 April 2022
14:00
Quarter-final

| Donegal (1) | 1-16 - 0-12 | Armagh (1) |
|---|---|---|
| Michael Murphy 0-6 (0-4f), Patrick McBrearty 1-2 (0-1f), Michael Langan 0-3, Shane O'Donnell, Ciaran Thompson, Jason McGee, Eoghan Ban Gallagher & Conor O'Donnell 0-1 each | Report | Rory Grugan 0-5 (0-3f), Tiernan Kelly, Conor Turbitt, Ben Crealey, Jarly-Óg Burns, Greg McCabe, Stefan Campbell & Oisin O'Neill 0-1 each |

MacCumhaill Park, Ballybofey
Attendance: 13,689
Referee: Maurice Deegan (Laois)
30 April 2022
16:30
Quarter-final

| Monaghan (1) | 0-23 - 2-7 | Down (3) |
|---|---|---|
| Jack McCarron 0-7 (0-2f, 0-1m), Conor McManus 0-4 (0-3f), Gary Mohan 0-3 (0-2m), Rory Beggan 0-2 (0-1f, 1 ‘45), Andrew Woods, Ryan Wylie, Conor McCarthy, Kieran Duffy, Shane Carey, Conor Boyle & Kieran Hughes 0-1 each | Report | Pat Havern 1-1, Caolan Mooney 1-0, Daniel Guinness 0-2 (1 '45), Conor Poland, Conor Francis, Tiarnan Rushe (0-1f) & Andrew Gilmore (0-1f) 0-1 each |

St Tiernach's Park, Clones
Attendance: 5,418
Referee: Fergal Kelly (Longford)
1 May 2022
16:00
Quarter-final

| Tyrone (1) | 0-10 - 1-18 | Derry (2) |
|---|---|---|
| Darren McCurry 0-4 (0-2f), Cathal McShane (0-2f) & Darragh Canavan (0-1f, 0-1m) 0-2 each, Niall Morgan (1 '45) & Ronan McNamee 0-1 each | Report | Shane McGuigan 1-4 (1-0p, 0-2f), Niall Loughlin 0-7 (0-5f, 1 '45), Benny Heron & Conor Doherty 0-2 each, Ethan Doherty, Gareth McKinless & Emmett Bradley (0-1m) 0-1 each |

Healy Park, Omagh
Attendance: 10,155
Referee: Paddy Neilan (Roscommon)

== Semi-finals ==
8 May 2022
16:00
Semi-final

| Cavan (3) | 0-16 - 2-16 | Donegal (1) |
|---|---|---|
| Paddy Lynch 0-6 (0-3f), Gearóid McKiernan (0-1f) & James Smith (0-1m) 0-3 each, Thomas Galligan 0-2, Gerard Smith & Raymond Galligan (0-1f) 0-1 each | Report | Paddy McBrearty 1-4 (0-3f), Michael Murphy 0-5 (0-4f), Jamie Brennan 0-4, Conor O'Donnell 1-0, Ciaran Thompson, Peader Mogan & Caolan McGonagle 0-1 each |

St Tiernach's Park, Clones
Attendance: 15,523
Referee: Conor Lane (Cork)
15 May 2022
16:00
Semi-final

| Derry (2) | 3-12 - 0-17 | Monaghan (1) |
|---|---|---|
| Shane McGuigan 0-7 (0-3f, 0-1m, 1 '45), Benny Heron 2-0, Gareth McKinless 1-0, Paul Cassidy 0-2, Emmett Bradley, Niall Loughlin & Niall Toner 0-1 each | Report | Conor McManus 0-7 (0-5f), Jack McCarron 0-4 (0-3f), Conor McCarthy, Darren Hughes, Andrew Woods, Dessie Ward, Niall Kearns & Ryan McAnespie 0-1 each |

Athletic Grounds, Armagh
Attendance: 14,446
Referee: David Gough (Meath)

== Final ==
29 May 2022
16:00
Final

| Derry (2) | 1-16 - 1-14 | Donegal (1) |
|---|---|---|
| Shane McGuigan 0-6 (0-5f), Niall Loughlin 1-2 (0-1f), Brendan Rogers 0-3, Shea Downey, Paul Cassidy, Conor Glass, Conor Doherty & Emmet Bradley 0-1 each | Report | Odhran McFadden-Ferry 1-0, Peadar Mogan 0-3, Michael Murphy, Shane O'Donnell & Paddy McBrearty (0-2f) 0-2 each, Michael Langan, Jason McGee, Ryan McHugh, Ciaran Thompson & Aaron Doherty 0-1 each |

St Tiernach's Park, Clones
Referee: Sean Hurson (Tyrone)

The winning team advanced to the 2022 All-Ireland SFC, while the losing team advanced to the All-Ireland SFC qualifiers.

== See also ==
- 2022 All-Ireland Senior Football Championship
  - 2022 Connacht Senior Football Championship
  - 2022 Leinster Senior Football Championship
  - 2022 Munster Senior Football Championship
