= Selector (sport) =

In some team sports, a selector is a member of a selection panel which chooses teams or individuals to represent a country or club or other representative team in sporting competitions.

For example, a selector in cricket is an administrative position involved in choosing players to represent a particular team in a match. Or, in Gaelic games a selector (sometimes referred to by the Irish term roghnóir) is a person who helps pick a team to represent a club or county team.

Selectors may be past players, but can also be current coaches. Current captains may also have an influence.

== See also ==
- Glossary of cricket terms
- Glossary of Gaelic games terms
- Glossary of rugby union terms
