= 2014 All-Ireland Minor Football Championship =

Gaelic football competition

All-Ireland Minor Football Championship 2014
Championship details
- Dates: April – 21 September 2014
- Teams: 34

All-Ireland Champions
- Winning team: Kerry (12th win)
- Captain: Dan O’Donoghue
- Manager: Jack O'Connor

All-Ireland Finalists
- Losing team: Donegal
- Manager: Declan Bonner

Provincial Champions
- Munster: Kerry
- Leinster: Dublin
- Ulster: Donegal
- Connacht: Mayo

Championship statistics
- No. matches played: 45
- Goals total: 1
- Points total: 1

The 2014 All-Ireland Minor Football Championship is the premier "knockout" competition for under-18 competitors who play the game of Gaelic football in Ireland. The games are organised by the Gaelic Athletic Association. The 2014 series of games started in May with the majority of the games played during the summer months. The All-Ireland Minor Football Final took place on 21 September in Croke Park, Dublin, preceding the Senior Game. In 2014 the title sponsor was Electric Ireland.

In the final, Kerry defeated Donegal by 0-17 to 1-10 to win their first minor title since 1994.

Numerous players who started for the finalists, Donegal and Kerry, were involved for their counties in the 2025 All-Ireland Senior Football Championship final, including, for Donegal, Eoghan Bán Gallagher and Caolan McGonagle, two of the players named to start in 2025, while 2025 substitutes Jamie Brennan and Stephen McMenamin began the 2014 minor decider as well.

== Fixtures and results ==
=== Munster Minor Football Championship ===
16 April 2014 Quarter-final	Tipperary	2-11 - 2-07	Waterford	Fraher Field
19:00		Report		Referee: Kevin Murphy Cork

16 April 2014 Quarter-final	Kerry	2-16 - 0-07	Clare	Cusack Park (Ennis)
19:00		Report		Referee: Sean Lonergan Tipperary

16 April 2014 Quarter-final	Cork	6-15 - 1-07	Limerick	Páirc Uí Rinn
19:00		Report		Referee: Seamus Mulvihilll Kerry

23 April 2014 Play Off 1	Clare	2-17 - 3-07	Limerick	Newcastle West
19:00		Report		Referee: Alan Kissane Waterford

29 April 2014 Play Off 2	Clare	4-12 - 6-09	Waterford	Fraher Field
19:00		Report		Referee: David Grogan Tipperary

5 May 2014 Semi-final	Kerry	2-18 - 0-07	Tipperary	Semple Stadium
19:00		http://www.thescore.ie/kerry-cork-minor-final-1556639-Jul2014/ Kerry crowned Munster minor football champions with four-point win over Cork		Referee: Kevin Murphy Cork

5 May 2014 Semi-final	Cork	1-14 - 1-08	Waterford	Fraher Field
19:00		Report		Referee: Eddie Walsh Kerry

6 July 2014 Final	Kerry	2-17 - 2-13	Cork	Páirc Uí Chaoimh
13:00	Killian Spillane 0-7 (0-6f), Jordan Kiely 1-1, Tomás Ó Sé 1-0, Brian Rayle, Liam Carey 0-2 each, Stephen O’Sullivan, Cormac Coffey, Matthew Flaherty, Micheál Burns 0-1 each	Report	Gary Murphy 1-5 (0-3f), Sean O’Donoghue 0-3 (0-2f), Seamus Ronayne 1-0, Michael Hurley 0-2, Michael Desmond (0-1f), Daniel Dineen (0-1f), Shane Kingston 0-1 each.	Referee: Richard Moloney Limerick

=== Ulster Minor Football Championship ===
22 June 2014 Semi-final	Donegal	2-19 - 1-10	Antrim	St Tiernach's Park, Clones
14:00		http://www.independent.ie/sport/gaelic-games/gaelic-football/donegal-too-strong-for-antrim-30375499.html Donegal Too Strong For Antrim		Referee: Kieran Trainor Down

29 June 2014 Semi-final	Armagh	1-8 - 0-9	Monaghan	St Tiernach's Park, Clones
17:00		Report		Referee: Niall Mooney Cavan

20 July 2014 Final	Donegal	2-12 - 0-10	Armagh	St Tiernach's Park, Clones
14:00		http://www.donegaldemocrat.ie/sport/gaelic-games/donegal-are-ulster-minor-champions-1-6190010 Donegal are Ulster minor champions		Referee: Ronan Barry Down

=== Connacht Minor Football Championship ===
28 June 2014 Semi-final	Roscommon	2-13 - 1-11	Leitrim	Dr. Hyde Park, Roscommon

28 June 2014 Semi-final	Mayo	3-07 - 1-12	Galway	Tuam Stadium, Galway
5:00 PM		http://www.midwestradio.ie/index.php/sport/21259-mayo-overcome-galway-by-a-point-in-connacht-minor-semi-final MAYO OVERCOME GALWAY BY A POINT IN CONNACHT MINOR SEMI-FINAL

12 July 2014 Final	Mayo	2-16 - 0-14	Roscommon	McHale Park, Castlebar
12:00 PM		http://thescore.thejournal.ie/mayo-win-connacht-minor-title-win-roscommon-1568836-Jul2014/ Mayo Secure Back to Back Connacht Titles With Victory Over Roscommon.		Referee: James Molloy Galway

=== Leinster Minor Football Championship ===
14 July 2014 Final	Kildare	1-12 - 3-16	Dublin	Croke Park, Dublin
	C O’Callaghan 1-6 (2f), A Byrne 1-2, C Basquel 1-2, W Egan 0-2, C Sallier 0-1, J Burke 0-1, E McHugh 0-1, G O’Reilly 0-1.	Report	S Dempsey 1-5 (3f, 1 ’45), M Kelly 0-2, E Boyle 0-2, C Hartley 0-1, C Kavanagh 0-1, E Flynn 0-1.	Referee: J Hickey Carlow

=== All Ireland Series Quarter-finals ===
2 August 2014 Quarter-final 1	Donegal	0-10 - 1-5	Roscommon	Markiewicz Park
3:00 PM	Cian Mulligan 0-4, John Campbell 0-3 (0-1f), Lorcán Connor 0-1 (0-1f), Michael Carroll and Jamie Brennan 0-1 each.	Report	Noel Gately 1-0, Kevin Smyth 0-3 (0-3f), Cathal Callinan and Hubert D’Arcy 0-1 each.	Referee: Cathal O Hagan Tyrone

3 August 2014 Quarter-final 2	Mayo	3-11 - 0-9	Armagh	Croke Park
12:00 PM	B Reape 2-1, F Duffy 1-2, C Hanley 0-3 (1f), M Ruane 0-1, G Boylan 0-1, B Duffy 0-1, TJ Byrne 0-1, S Conlon 0-1, C Byrne 0-1, O Horan 0-1	Report	O O'Neill 0-4 (3f), R McKeown 0-1, R Hughes 0-1 (1f), J Burns 0-1, C McConville 0-1, C Grimley 0-1	Referee: Paddy Neilan Roscommon

4 August 2014 Quarter-final 3	Dublin	2-14 - 1-13	Cork	Semple Stadium
2:00 PM	C O’Callaghan 0-8 (4f), C Sallier 2-1, C Basquel 0-3 (1 pen), E McHugh 0-2.	Report	S Kingston 1-2; G Murphy, S Roynane 0-2 each; S O’Donoghue, C Kiely, M Ó Duinnín, B Coakley, M Ó Deasuna (f), D Ó Duinnín (f), M Hurley 0-1 each.	Referee: J Henry (Mayo)

4 August 2014 Quarter-final 4	Kerry	2-15 - 1-8	Kildare	Semple Stadium
3:45 PM	K Spillane 0-6 (5f); T Ó Sé 1-2; J Kiely 1-0; M Burns 0-3; L Carey 0-2; S Ryan 0-1 (45), B O’Sullivan 0-1 each.	Report	S Ryan 1-0; B McCormack 0-3 (2f); S Dempsey 0-2 (1f, 1 45); C Hartley, E O’Donoghue, M Kelly 0-1 each.	Referee: N Cullen (Fermanagh)

=== All Ireland Series Semi-finals ===
24 August 2014 Semi-final	Mayo	2-7 - 1-14	Kerry	Croke Park, Dublin
13.30	TJ Byrne 2-0, G Boylan 0-4 (3f), F Duffy and B Reape 0-1, C Hanley 0-1 (f)	Report	K Spillane 0-6 (3fs), T O Se 1-1, L Carey 0-3, M O'Connor, M Flaherty and M Burns 0-1, S Ryan 0-1 (f)	Referee: S Hurson (Tyrone)

31 August 2014 Semi-final	Dublin	1-11 - 1-12	Donegal	Croke Park, Dublin
13.30	J Burke (1-1), C O’Callaghan (0-4, two frees), C Sallier (0-2), A Byrne, C Kavanagh, E McHugh and C Basquel (0-1 each).	Report	J Campbell (1-2), S McBrearty (0-4), L Connor (0-3, two frees), C Mulligan (0-2), E O’Donnell (0-1).	Referee: D O’Mahoney (Tipperary).

=== All Ireland Minor Football final ===
21 September 1914 Final	Kerry	0-17 - 1-10	Donegal	Croke Park, Dublin
13:15	K Spillane 0-5 (3f), M Burns 0-2, B O’Sullivan 0-2, L Carey 0-2, J Kiely 0-2, M Flaherty 0-1, T Ó Sé 0-1, S Ryan 0-1 (1f), T O’Sullivan 0-1	Report	J Brennan 1-1, S McBrearty 0-2, J Campbell 0-2 (1f), L Connor 0-2 (2f), C McGonagle 0-1 (1f), C Mulligan 0-1, N Harley 0-1	Referee: Fergal Kelly (Longford)
