= 2024 Donegal Senior Football Championship =

GAA football championship for 2024

Donegal SFC
- Season: 2024
- Champions: St Eunan's (16th title)
- Relegated: Cloich Cheann Fhaola
- Winning captain: Kieran Tobin
- Gradam Shéamuis Mhic Géidigh: Shane O'Donnell
- Winning manager: Barry Meehan

The 2024 Donegal Senior Football Championship was the 102nd official edition of Donegal GAA's premier Gaelic football tournament for senior graded clubs in County Donegal. 16 teams competed, with the winner representing Donegal in the 2024 Ulster Senior Club Football Championship.

The favourite to take the Donegal SFC title was two-time defending champion, bidding for a third consecutive title, Naomh Conaill.

St Eunan's ultimately won the title.

== Team changes ==
The following teams changed division since the 2023 championship season.

=== To SFC ===
Promoted from 2023 Donegal IFC

- Na Dúnaibh (IFC Champions)

=== From SFC ===
Relegated to 2024 Donegal IFC

- Milford

== Teams ==
Team	Captain(s)	Manager(s)	Most recent title	Last year
An Clochán Liath	Conor O'Donnell	Dessie Gallagher	1958	SFC preliminary quarter-finalist
Aodh Ruadh	Eamonn McGrath	Maurice McLaughlin	1998	SFC quarter-finalist
Ard an Rátha	Kevin Whyte	Damian Devaney	2004	SFC quarter-finalist
Cill Chartha	Eoin McHugh	Michael Hegarty	2017	SFC quarter-finalist
Cloich Cheann Fhaola	Darren McGeever	Denis Doohan	—	SFC preliminary quarter-finalist
Four Masters	Caolan Loughney	Kevin Sinclair	2003	SFC preliminary quarter-finalist
Gaoth Dobhair	Niall Friel	Rónán Mac Niallais	2018	SFC finalist
Glenfin	Ciaran Brady	Frank Ward	—	SFC preliminary quarter-finalist
Glenswilly	Jack Gallagher	Gary McDaid	2016	SFC quarter-finalist
Na Cealla Beaga	Jack McSharry	Pauric Bonner	1996	SFC relegation semi-finalist
Na Dúnaibh	Ben McNutt	Maxi Curran	—	IFC winner
Naomh Conaill	Ultan Doherty	Martin Regan	2023	SFC winner
Seán Mac Cumhaills	Oisín Gallen	Gary Wilson	1977	SFC semi-finalist
St Eunan's	Kieran Tobin	Barry Meehan	2021	SFC semi-finalist
St Michael's	Liam Paul Ferry	Cathal Sweeney & Raymond McLaughlin	—	SFC relegation semi-finalist
St Naul's	Ian Campbell	Stephen Griffin (player–manager)	—	SFC relegation finalist

== Format ==
Michael Hegarty was critical of the format, which involved a league phase consisting of 32 games played on four different weekends, to reduce the number of clubs left in the competition by four.

== League stage ==
Pos	Team	P	W	L	D	F	A	PD	Pts	Qualification or relegation
1	Gleann tSúilí	4	4	0	0	67	45	+22	8	Advance to quarter-finals
2	St Michael's	4	4	0	0	53	37	+16	8	Advance to quarter-finals
3	Naomh Conaill	4	3	1	0	75	30	+45	6	Advance to quarter-finals
4	Cill Chartha	4	3	1	0	69	46	+23	6	Advance to quarter-finals
5	An Clochán Liath	4	3	1	0	57	36	+21	6	Advance to preliminary quarter-finals
6	St Eunan's	4	3	1	0	56	36	+20	6	Advance to preliminary quarter-finals
7	Four Masters	4	3	1	0	54	36	+18	6	Advance to preliminary quarter-finals
8	Gaoth Dobhair	4	2	2	0	42	38	+4	4	Advance to preliminary quarter-finals
9	Seán Mac Cumhaills	4	2	2	0	56	62	-6	4	Advance to preliminary quarter-finals
10	Na Cealla Beaga	4	1	3	0	48	54	-6	2	Advance to preliminary quarter-finals
11	Ard an Rátha	4	1	3	0	48	64	-16	2	Advance to preliminary quarter-finals
12	Na Dúnaibh	4	1	3	0	39	56	-17	2	Advance to preliminary quarter-finals
13	Gleann Fhinne	4	1	3	0	40	60	-20	2	Advance to relegation playoff
14	Aodh Ruadh Ballyshannon	4	1	3	0	43	69	-26	2	Advance to relegation playoff
15	Cloich Cheann Fhaola	4	0	4	0	34	72	-38	0	Advance to relegation playoff
16	St Naul's	4	0	4	0	33	73	-40	0	Advance to relegation playoff

== Knockout stage ==
Preliminary quarter-finals
St Eunan's	2–11
Ard an Rátha	0–5
Gaoth Dobhair	0–16
Seán Mac Cumhaills	0–8
Four Masters	0–8
Na Cealla Beaga	0–4
An Clochán Liath	1–7
Na Dúnaibh	0–6

Quarter-finals
St Eunan's	0–10
Naomh Conaill	0–9
Gaoth Dobhair	0–9
Four Masters	0–7
Gleann tSúilí	0–13
An Clochán Liath	2–8
St Michael's	2–8
Cill Chartha	0–13

Semi-finals
St Eunan's	0–8
Gaoth Dobhair	0–7
An Clochán Liath	0–9
St Michael's	0–8

Final
St Eunan's	1–13
An Clochán Liath	1–10

=== Preliminary quarter-finals ===
Teams ranked 5–12 were paired up based on league phase ranking for the preliminary quarter-finals, which were played at neutral venues.

14 September 2024; Preliminary quarter-final	An Clochán Liath	1–7 — 0–6	Na Dúnaibh	Pairc Naomh Fionnan; Referee: Jimmy White (Killybegs)
14 September 2024; Preliminary quarter-final	Oisin Bonner 1–1; Dylan Sweeney and Conor Greene (1M) 0–2 each; Barry Curran and Matthew Ward 0–1 each	Report	Johnny McGroddy 0–5, 2fs, 1 '45'; Oisin Boyce (M), Paddy McElwee and Keelan McGroddy 0–1 each.	Pairc Naomh Fionnan; Referee: Jimmy White (Killybegs)

14 September 2024; Preliminary quarter-final	St Eunan's	2–11 — 0–5	Ard an Rátha	??? Referee: Robbie O'Donnell (Naomh Muire)
14 September 2024; Preliminary quarter-final	Conor Morrison and Niall O'Donnell 1–0; Pauric Boyle, Conor O'Donnell Jnr, and Eoin Dowling 1M, 1f, 0–2 each; Ciarán Moore, Anthony Gallagher, Kieran Tobin, Aaron Deeney, and Eoin McGeehin 1M, 0–1 each	Report	KJ Molloy 0–3, 1f, 1M; CJ Molloy and Cailum Malley 0–1 each	??? Referee: Robbie O'Donnell (Naomh Muire)

15 September 2024; Preliminary quarter-final	Four Masters	0–8 — 0–4	Na Cealla Beaga	Ardara; Referee: Enda McFeely (St Mary's Convoy)
15 September 2024; Preliminary quarter-final	Seanán Carr 0–3, 3fs; Conor Reid 0–2, 1f; Alex McCalmont, Richard O'Rourke, and Aaron McCrea 0–1 each	Report	Evan Broderick 0–2; Rory Colyer and Jack McSharry 0–1 each	Ardara; Referee: Enda McFeely (St Mary's Convoy)

15 September 2024; Preliminary quarter-final	Gaoth Dobhair	0–16 — 0–8	Seán Mac Cumhaills	O'Donnell Park; Referee: Anthony Mc Callig (Naomh Ultan)
15 September 2024; Preliminary quarter-final	Ethan Harkin 0–4, 4f; Daire Ó Baoill 0–3; Eamonn Collum and Cathal Gillespie 0–2, 1f; Domhnall Mac Giolla Bhríde 0–2; Fionnán Coyle, Eoin de Búrca, Stephen Donna McFadden 0–1	Report	Oisín Gallen 0–5, 4f, 45; Aaron Gilhooley 0–1; Kevin McCormack, Steven O'Reilly 0–1	O'Donnell Park; Referee: Anthony Mc Callig (Naomh Ultan)

=== Quarter-finals ===
21 September 2024; 14:00; Quarter-final	An Clochán Liath	2–8 — 0–13	Gleann tSúilí	Cloich Cheann Fhaola; Referee: Ryan Walsh (Réalt na Mara)
21 September 2024; 14:00; Quarter-final	Darren Curran 1–1; Oisin Bonner 0–4, 3f; Daire Gallagher 1–0; Dylan Sweeney and Conor Greene 0–1; Ryan Connors 0–1; 1f	Report	Michael Murphy 0–4, 3f, 1m; Kealan Dunleavy and Daithi Gildea 0–2; Gary McFadden 0–2, 1f; Shane McDevitt, Jamie McCauley and Donal Gallagher 0–1	Cloich Cheann Fhaola; Referee: Ryan Walsh (Réalt na Mara)

21 September 2024; 19:30; Quarter-final	St Eunan's	0–10 — 0–9	Naomh Conaill	MacCumhaill Park; Referee: Marc Brown (Four Masters)
21 September 2024; 19:30; Quarter-final	Conor O'Donnell Jnr 0–2,2f; Niall O'Donnell 0–2; Conor O'Donnell Snr, James Kelly, Shane O'Donnell, Ciarán Moore, Darragh Mulgrew and Eoin McGeehin 0–1 each	Report	Ciarán Thompson 0–4,4f; Charles McGuinness 0–2,1f; Anthony Thompson, Keelin McGill (mark), John O'Malley 0–1 each	MacCumhaill Park; Referee: Marc Brown (Four Masters)

22 September 2024; 13:30; Quarter-final	St Michael's	2–8 — 0–13	Cill Chartha	Davy Brennan Memorial Park; Referee: Enda McFeely (St Mary's Convoy)
22 September 2024; 13:30; Quarter-final	Daniel McLaughlin 0–6,5f; Colin McFadden, Carlos O'Reilly 1–0 each; Michael McGinley 0–2	Report	Patrick McBrearty 0–6,3f; Matthew McClean 0–2,1f; Ciaran McGinley 0–2; Mark McHugh, Mark Sweeney, Oran Doogan 0–1 each	Davy Brennan Memorial Park; Referee: Enda McFeely (St Mary's Convoy)

22 September 2024; 16:30; Quarter-final	Gaoth Dobhair	0–9 — 0–7	Four Masters	MacCumhaill Park; Referee: Mark Dorrian (Gaeil Fhánada)
22 September 2024; 16:30; Quarter-final	Eamonn Collum, Domhnall Mac Giolla Bhríde and Daire Ó Baoill 0–2 each; Ethan Harkin 0–1, 1f; Eoin de Burca and Stephen McFadden 0–1 each	Report	Seanán Carr 0–2, 2fs; Conor Reid, Aaron McCrea, Alex McCalmont, Richard O'Rourke, and Joe Leape 0–1 each	MacCumhaill Park; Referee: Mark Dorrian (Gaeil Fhánada)

=== Semi-finals ===
28 September 2024 ??? Semi-final	St Eunan's	0–8 — 0–7	Gaoth Dobhair	MacCumhaill Park; Referee: Enda McFeely (St Mary's Convoy)
28 September 2024 ??? Semi-final	Conor O'Donnell Jnr 0–3, 3f; Eoin Dowling 0–2, 1f; Niall O'Donnell 0–1 and James Kelly 0–1; Eoin McGeehin 0–1, 1m	Report	Micheál Roarty 0–2; Eoin de Búrca 0–2, 1m; Eamonn Collum and Stephen Donna McFadden 0–1; Daire Ó Baoill 0–1, 1f	MacCumhaill Park; Referee: Enda McFeely (St Mary's Convoy)

29 September 2024 ??? Semi-final	An Clochán Liath	0–9 — 0–8	St Michael's	O'Donnell Park; Referee: Mark Dorrian (Gaeil Fhánada)
29 September 2024 ??? Semi-final	Ryan Connors 0–3,3f; Oisin Bonner 0–1,1m; Karl Magee 0–1; Daire Gallagher 0–1; Barry Curran 0–1; Dylan Sweeney 0–1; Darren Curran 0–1	Report	Daniel McLaughlin 0–5,5f; Michael Langan 0–2,2f; Michael Cannon 0–1	O'Donnell Park; Referee: Mark Dorrian (Gaeil Fhánada)

=== Final ===
An Clochán Liath had not played in any final in recent decades. The score at half-time was four points a piece. In the second half, an effort by Niall O'Donnell of St Eunan's rebounded off the post and Conor O'Donnell Jnr was there to hit the ball into the back of the net for what proved to be the game's opening goal. An Clochán Liath then received the benefit of a controversial penalty decision, which resulted in Shaun Patton's concession of the game's second goal. St Eunan's – the more experienced team though – ultimately won this decider, with Ciarán Moore, Eoin McGeehin and O'Donnell Jnr adding on scores towards the end. In doing so, the club secured a 16th SFC title to once again move ahead of Gaoth Dobhair, left trailing on 15.

An Clochán Liath followed Glenswilly in losing an SFC final two years after winning the Donegal Intermediate Football Championship.

13 October 2024; Final	St Eunan's	1–13 — 1–10	An Clochán Liath	MacCumhaill Park; Referee: Ryan Walsh (Réalt na Mara)
13 October 2024; Final	Conor O'Donnell Jnr 1–4, 2f; Ciarán Moore 0–3; Niall O'Donnell 0–2, 1f; Pauric Boyle, Aaron Deeney, Kieran Tobin, Eoin McGeehin 0–1 each	Report	Ryan Connors 1–2, 1–0, 2f), Dylan Sweeney, Danny Rodgers 0–2, 1f, 45; Conor Greene 0–2, 0–1; Aaron Neely, Barry Curran 0–1 each	MacCumhaill Park; Referee: Ryan Walsh (Réalt na Mara)

== Ulster Senior Club Football Championship ==
St Eunan's advanced to the 2024 Ulster Senior Club Football Championship, losing in the preliminary round to Tyrone champions Errigal Ciarán, who went on to reach the All-Ireland Club Championship final.

== Relegation ==
=== Relegation playoff semi-finals ===
15 September 2024; Relegation playoff semi-final	Aodh Ruadh Ballyshannon	2–15 — 0–9	Cloich Cheann Fhaola	MacCumhaill Park; Referee: Marc Brown (Four Masters)
15 September 2024; Relegation playoff semi-final	Jack Gallagher 1–5,4f; Shane McGrath 1–0; Matthew Gillespie 0–2; David Dolan, Mark McGlynn, Johnny Gethins Darren Drummond, Oisin Rooney, Senan Rooney, Diarmaid McInerney, Michael McKenna 0–1 each	Report	Shaun Maguire 0–2; Sean McGarvey 0–3,3f; Blake McGarvey 0–2,1f., Conor Coyle, Ciaran Coll 0–1 each.	MacCumhaill Park; Referee: Marc Brown (Four Masters)

15 September 2024; Relegation playoff semi-final	Gleann Fhinne	0–10 — 0–8	St Naul's	Tirconaill Park; Referee: Ryan Walsh (Réalt na Mara)
15 September 2024; Relegation playoff semi-final	Luke McGlynn 0–4,2f; Shaun Ward 0–3,2f; Jack Long, Odhran McGlynn, Daniel Marley (f) 0–1 each.	Report	Ian Campbell, Joe Campbell, Peadar Mogan (1f) 0–2 each; Declan Duignan, Gavin Mulreany (f) 0–1 each	Tirconaill Park; Referee: Ryan Walsh (Réalt na Mara)

=== Relegation playoff final ===
28 September 2024; Relegation playoff final	St Naul's	2–7 — 0–5	Cloich Cheann Fhaola	Glenswilly; Referee: Jimmy White (Killybegs)
28 September 2024; Relegation playoff final	Peadar Mogan 1–2; Declan Duignan 1–0; Stephen Griffin (1f), Joe Campbell 0–2 each; Gavin Mulreany 0–1	Report	Darren Ferry, Blake McGarvey 0–2 each; Shaun Maguire 0–1	Glenswilly; Referee: Jimmy White (Killybegs)

== Gradam Shéamuis Mhic Géidigh ==
Shane O'Donnell of St Eunan's picked up the Gradam Shéamuis Mhic Géidigh, having been selected as Player of the Donegal Championship 2024.
