= 2013 Donegal county football team season =

Donegal county football team
2013 season
- Manager: Jim McGuinness
- Stadium: MacCumhaill Park, Ballybofey
- All-Ireland SFC: Quarter-finalist
- Ulster SFC: Finalist

The following is a summary of Donegal county football team's 2013 season.

The 2013 Donegal county football team season was the franchise's 109th season since the County Board's foundation in 1905. The team entered the season as defending All-Ireland champions after winning Sam Maguire MMXII.

Jim McGuinness returned for his third season as the team's manager. Pioneer of the game's revolutionary tactic The System, he entered the season with two Ulster titles (2011, 2012). Attempting to secure an unprecedented three-in-a-row this season, his men came undone in the final game of the series against Monaghan. Two games later they lost their All-Ireland crown against Mayo.

== Competitions ==
=== Ulster Senior Football Championship ===
26 May 2013
4:00pm
Quarter-final

Donegal	2-10 - 0-10	Tyrone
C McFadden 1-3 (2f), R Wherity 1-0, M Murphy 0-3 (2f), P McBrearty 0-2, R Kavanagh, David Walsh 0-1 each.	Report	M Donnelly, S Cavanagh (1f) 0-2 each, N Morgan (1f), J McMahon, C Cavanagh, S O'Neill, C McAliskey, K Coney 0-1 each.

MacCumhaill Park, Ballybofey
Attendance: 17,519
Referee: Joe McQuillan (Cavan)
23 June 2013
2:00pm
Semi-final

Donegal	0-12 - 0-09	Down
M Murphy (4f), C McFadden (2f) 0-5 each, R Kavanagh, P McBrearty 0-1 each.	Report	D O'Hare 0-6 (5f), M Poland, J Johnston, D Savage 0-1 each.

Breffni Park, Cavan
Attendance: 21,715
Referee: Eddie Kinsella (Laois)
21 July 2013
4:00pm
Final

Donegal	0-07 - 0-13	Monaghan
C McFadden (4f) 0-4, F McGlynn, R Kavanagh, R McHugh 0-1 each.	Report	C McManus (3f), K Hughes 0-3 each, R Beggan (1f 1 '45) 0-2, D Mone, D Hughes, P Donaghy, C McGuinness, T Freeman 0-1 each.

St Tiernach's Park, Clones
Attendance: 31,812
Referee: David Coldrick (Meath)

=== All-Ireland Senior Football Championship ===
27 July 2013
5:00 pm
Round 4 Qualifier

Laois	0-08 – 0-14	Donegal
R Munnelly (2f) 0-04; D Kingston 0-02; C Meredith, D Conway 0-01 each	Report	C McFadden (4f) 0-06; P McBrearty 0-03; M Murphy (1f) 0-02; David Walsh, L McLoone, N McGee 0-01 each

Páirc Seán Mac Diarmada, Carrick-on-Shannon
Referee: Marty Duffy (Sligo)
4 August 2013
4:00 pm
Quarter-final

Mayo	4-17 – 1-10	Donegal
C O'Connor 3-04 (0-2f, 0-1 45), D Vaughan 1-00, A Dillon, A Freeman 0-02 each; C Boyle, A Moran, K McLoughlin, C Boyle, L Keegan, S O'Shea, K Keane, E Varley, C Barrett, R Feeney 0-01 each.	Report	M Murphy 0-05 (0-4f), C McFadden 1-00 (1-0 f) M McHugh 0-02, David Walsh, M McHugh, K Lacey 0-01 each.

Croke Park, Dublin
Attendance: 61,784
Referee: Joe McQuillan (Cavan)

== Panel ==
The following were called into the senior panel for the 2013 Dr McKenna Cup.

No.	Player	Position	Club
	Peter Boyle	Goalkeeper	Aodh Ruadh
	Pauric Carr		Cill Chartha
	Adi O'Gara		Naomh Muire
	Eoin McHugh		Cill Chartha
	Kevin McFadden^{COC}		Cloich Cheann Fhaola
	Cory Gallagher		An Clochán Liath
	Luke Keaney		Four Masters
	Ciaran Cannon^{COC}		Gaeil Leitir Ceanainn
	Packie Mailey^{COC}		Convoy
	James Carroll		Gaoth Dobhair
	Michael Cannon		St Michael's
	Odhrán Mac Niallais^{COC}		Gaoth Dobhair
	Ross Wherity^{COC}		St Eunan's
	John O'Malley		Naomh Conaill

No.	Player	Position	Club
	Conor Gibbons^{COC}		St Eunan's
	Shaun McGarvey		Cloich Cheann Fhaola
	Willie Gillespie^{COC}		Naomh Colmcille
	Jason Campbell		Naomh Conaill
	Shane McGowan		Réalt na Mara
	Caolan Ward^{COC}		St Eunan's
	Leon Kelly		Glenswilly

Minor panel

- Correct as of 17 April 2013.

No.	Player	Position	Club
	Jamie Brennan		Réalt na Mara
	Eamon McGrath		Aodh Ruadh
	Aiden Sweeney		Termon
	Jack Scally		An Clochán Liath
	Eoin Scally		An Clochán Liath
	Colm Kelly		Aodh Ruadh
	Peter McLaughlin		Buncrana
	Patrick Gillespie		Naomh Muire
	Lee O'Brien		Cloich Cheann Fhaola
	Eoghan Bán Gallagher		Na Cealla Beaga
	Bruce Waldron		Buncrana
	Paddy Byrne		Naomh Columba
	Conor McEniff		St Eunan's
	Conor O'Donnell		St Eunan's
	Jack O'Brien		Naomh Muire
	Oisin Carr		St Eunan's
	Jordan McBride		St Eunan's

No.	Player	Position	Club
	Hugh Yank Gallagher		Naomh Muire
	Lorcan Connor		Downings
	Darach O'Connor		Buncrana
	Cian Mulligan		Gaoth Dobhair
	Conor McCormick		Carndonagh
	David Tyrell		St Eunan's
	Martin Byrne		Cill Chartha
	Conor Harkin		Burt
	Calum Gallagher		Naomh Bríd
	Stephen Jones		Naomh Columba
	Aodhan McGinley		Cill Chartha
	Stephen McBrearty		Cill Chartha
	Daire McDaid		Termon
	Alan Russell		Réalt na Mara
	John Campbell		Buncrana
	Paddy Duffy		Buncrana
	Niall Friel		Gaoth Dobhair

Notes

- ^A "McKenna Cup: Holiday is over for Donegal". 10 January 2013.
- ^B "McKenna Cup: Monaghan ease past Donegal second string". 14 January 2013.
- ^C "McKenna Cup: Gibbons earns Donegal a first win". 17 January 2013.
- ^D "Mac Niallais catches eye". Irish Independent. 17 January 2013.

== Management team ==
- Manager: Jim McGuinness (senior team)
- Selectors: Rory Gallagher, Maxi Curran, Pat Shovelin
- Surgical consultant: Kevin Moran
- Team doctor: Charlie McManus
- Team physio: Dermot Simpson
- Physiotherapists: Charlie Molloy, Paul Coyle, Donal Reid, JD.
- Manager: Stephen Friel (minor team)

== Awards ==
=== Footballer of the Year ===
Michael Murphy
