= CLG Naomh Bríd =

Donegal-based Gaelic games club

Naomh Bríd
- Naomh Bríd
- Founded: 1976
- County: Donegal
- Colours: Green And Black
- Grounds: CLG Naomh Bríd

Playing kits
Standard colours

CLG Naomh Bríd is a Gaelic football club in the south of County Donegal, Ireland. Several of the club's players have been involved with the Donegal county team.

== History ==
So began the official history of Naomh Brid CLG or as it was known in those days Ballintra GAA. Gaelic games had been played in the parish since the early 1900s, but seemed to have been done so on an ad hoc basis, with interest developing and waning at various times. Many different venues were used for the playing of games during those years from Inishfad to Shannagh and from Carrick to Roscanlan. It appears that there was a good team in the area during the 30s who played in the Senior Championship in 1934 which was then played on a Divisional basis. Rivals Bundoran would win the County title that year in a game refereed by Mr.C.J.Boyle, a National School teacher in Ballintra. Sadly interest dropped during the 60s and any young man wishing to play football was doing so with neighbouring clubs such as Drumbar or Ballyshannon. The 70s saw a real resurgence of interest in Gaelic games within the County. At the start of that decade Donegal had yet to win an Ulster Senior Title and there were less than twenty clubs registered with the County Board, (less than half the current number of Clubs). The Donegal Senior team finally won a first Ulster Senior title in 1972 and followed this up with another title in 1974. Perhaps it was this success by the County team that saw an upsurge of interest in football, for over the following years, clubs such as Na Rossa, Glenfin, Naomh Ultan, Naomh Muire and, of course, Naomh Bríd, all formed.

The club was relegated from the IFC to the JFC in 2023.

== Notable players ==
- Matt Gallagher — 1992 All-Ireland SFC winner
- David Walsh — 2012 All-Ireland SFC winner

== Managers ==
Years	Manager
1976–2019	—N/a
2020–2021	Dougie Corbett
2021–2022	Aidan Murray
2023–	Sean Maher

== Honours ==
- Donegal Intermediate Football Championship (1): 1987
- Donegal Junior Football Championship (3): 1986, 2003, 2006
