= Caolan McGonagle =

Irish Gaelic footballer (born 1995/96)

Personal information
- Born: 1995 or 1996 (age 30–31)
- Occupation: Secondary school teacher
- Height: 6 ft 1 in (185 cm)

Sport
- Sport: Gaelic football
- Position: Midfield
Club
- Years: Club
- 201?–: Buncrana
Inter-county
- Years: County
- 201?–: Donegal
- Ulster titles: 3

Caolan McGonagle (born 1995/6) is an Irish Gaelic footballer who plays for Buncrana and the Donegal county team.

== Playing career ==
=== Club ===
McGonagle's club Buncrana was relegated to the Donegal Junior Football Championship. However, he led the club back to the Donegal Intermediate Football Championship in 2019.

=== Under-age ===
As a youth, McGonagle played as a goalkeeper. Declan Bonner called McGonagle into his development squad but by the 2013 McGuigan Cup (Ulster Under-17) Final, McGonagle had moved outfield.

He played in midfield as Donegal reached the final of the 2014 All-Ireland Minor Football Championship. However, he did not play in the 2017 Ulster Under-21 Football Championship Final, nor did he play in the 2017 All-Ireland Under-21 Football Championship semi-final.

=== Senior ===
First featuring for his county at senior level under the management of Rory Gallagher, McGonagle was first called up ahead of the 2016 season as one of twelve new recruits, alongside such players as Eoghan Bán Gallagher, Stephen McMenamin and Ciarán Thompson. McGonagle played twice during Donegal's Division One campaign in the 2016 National Football League, featuring in the first and last fixtures, both times as a substitute: first he made a late appearance in the league opener against Down, then he came on in the league semi-final defeat to Dublin.

Under the management of Declan Bonner, McGonagle started the opening fixture of the 2018 National Football League against Kerry in Killarney. He also started the next game against Galway. He came on as an early substitute for Nathan Mullins in the next game away to Dublin. He also appeared as a substitute in the fourth and sixth games, against Kildare and Monaghan respectively.

McGonagle made a substitute appearance in the 2018 Ulster Senior Football Championship preliminary round defeat of Cavan but made no further appearances in the competition as Donegal secured the Anglo-Celt Cup.

McGonagle started against Clare in the opening fixture of the 2019 National Football League in Ennis, scoring one point from a free. He scored the only goal of the game against Meath in the second fixture. He started the third, fourth, fifth and sixth fixtures against Tipperary, Fermanagh, Armagh and Cork. He started the seventh fixture against Kildare, scoring one point. Donegal qualified for the National Football League Division 2 final and McGonagle started the game as Donegal defeated Meath to win the title. McGonagle had featured in a lot of matches during the 2019 National Football League. Then he sustained an injury.

McGonagle started Donegal's first fixture of the 2020 National Football League against Mayo and scored a point. He did not participate in the second game against Meath. He later started the third, fourth and fifth games against Galway, Dublin and Monaghan respectively. Then the COVID-19 pandemic brought play to a halt. Play resumed behind closed doors on 18 October with a home game against Tyrone; McGonagle started that game and scored a point. He also started and scored a point in the concluding game of the league campaign away to Kerry.

McGonagle made his first championship start against Tyrone in the 2020 Ulster Senior Football Championship quarter-final. He also started the semi-final victory against Armagh, scoring two points (including one mark), and the final against Cavan, in which he scored two points.

McGonagle started each of Donegal's four fixtures of the 2021 National Football League, against Tyrone, Monaghan, Armagh and Dublin, scoring one point each against Tyrone and Monaghan and two points against Dublin. He started each of Donegal's three fixtures in the 2021 Ulster Senior Football Championship, scoring two points against Derry in the quarter-final and a goal against Tyrone in the semi-final.

McGonagle started Donegal's first two fixtures of the 2022 National Football League, against Mayo and Kildare. He did not play in the third game, against Kerry, nor in the remaining fixtures against Tyrone, Monaghan, Dublin and Armagh. He made a substitute appearance against Armagh in the 2022 Ulster Senior Football Championship quarter-final and followed this with a temporary substitute appearance (for Hugh McFadden) against Cavan in the semi-final (during which he scored a point). He started the final against Derry (which included extra-time, during which he was substituted). He also started the 2022 All-Ireland Senior Football Championship qualifier loss to Armagh, standing in as goalkeeper for a penalty kick when Shaun Patton was shown a black card.

== Personal life ==
McGonagle is a secondary school teacher at St Eunan's College in Letterkenny. He teaches physical education and mathematics.

== Honours ==
Player

- Ulster Senior Football Championship: 2018, 2024, 2025
- National Football League Division 2: 2019, 2024
- All-Ireland Minor Football Championship finalist: 2014
- Ulster Minor Football Championship: 2014
- Donegal Junior Football Championship: 2019

Individual

- Gaelic Life Ulster Club All Star: 2019
- All Star: 0
  - Nominated in 2024
