= Michael Lynch (Gaelic footballer) =

Irish Gaelic footballer (born 1996)

Personal information
- Born: 28 November 1996 (age 29) Derry, Northern Ireland
- Occupation: Corporate Sales Executive
- Height: 6 ft 0 in (183 cm)

Sport
- Sport: Gaelic football
- Position: Goalkeeper
Clubs
- Years: Club
- 201?–2020 2020–: Naomh Colmcille; Gaoth Dobhair
Inter-county
- Years: County
- 201?–: Donegal

Michael Lynch (born 28 November 1996) is an Irish goalkeeper who plays Gaelic football for Gaoth Dobhair (and formerly Naomh Colmcille) and for the Donegal county team.

Lynch is from St Johnston.

== Playing career ==
Lynch played at midfield in Naomh Colmcille's run to the 2015 Donegal Intermediate Football Championship final, which the club lost to Réalt na Mara. He began the campaign as a substitute for the injured Ryan McErlean in the first minute of Naomh Colmcille's win in the quarter-final of that competition.

Lynch played his club football in midfield for Naomh Colmcille before transferring to Gaoth Dobhair in 2020. The then Gaoth Dobhair manager Mervyn O'Donnell said Lynch had been living nearby since the start of 2020, had attended training and was close to fellow Donegal player Odhrán McFadden-Ferry. He had won the 2017 Donegal Junior Football Championship and Ulster Junior Club Football Championship with his former club. He scored three points (including one '45) in the Ulster Club JFC final.

His transfer to Gaoth Dobhair led to a three-month suspension due to him playing for his new club before he was officially allowed to do so.

Lynch is a former underage goalkeeper for League of Ireland association football team Derry City.

Under the management of Declan Bonner, Lynch became an understudy to Shaun Patton and Paul Durcan in the senior inter-county panel. He made his senior debut for Donegal against Derry in the 2020 Dr McKenna Cup.

Lynch made a substitute appearance in the 2022 All-Ireland Senior Football Championship qualifier loss to Armagh, after regular goalkeeper Patton was shown a black card.
