= McConigley =

McConigley is a surname. Notable people with the surname include:

- Nimi McConigley, Indian-American politician
- Paddy McConigley, Irish Gaelic footballer
- Nina McConigley, American author
- Cillian McConigley, Irish fisherman and entrepreneur
