= Eoin McHugh =

Irish Gaelic footballer (born 1994/95)

Personal information
- Native name: Eoin Mac Aodha (Irish)
- Born: 1994 or 1995 (age 31–32)
- Occupation: Marketing and Regulations Manager

Sport
- Sport: Gaelic football
Club
- Years: Club
- 201?–: Cill Chartha
Inter-county
- Years: County
- 2013–: Donegal
- Ulster titles: 2

Eoin McHugh (born 1994/95) is an Irish Gaelic footballer who plays for Cill Chartha and the Donegal county team.

He is the only son of James McHugh, a member of the team that defeated Dublin in the 1992 All-Ireland Senior Football Championship Final. His uncle Martin was also a member of that team.

== Playing career ==
=== Club ===
With his club Cill Chartha, McHugh won the 2012 Donegal Minor Football Championship. He scored six points in the final and his use of both feet in executing these scores during a man of the match display was praised in the press.

McHugh won the 2017 Donegal Senior Football Championship. It was the first time his club had won the title in 24 years.

When he captained his club to the 2024 Comórtas Peile na Gaeltachta, father and son completed a unique feat, with James McHugh having captained their club to the third of his four titles in 1990.

=== Inter-county ===
McHugh was an "experiment" of Jim McGuinness during the 2013 Dr McKenna Cup, with McGuinness giving him his debut in a defeat of St Mary's at MacCumhaill Park. He continued to play for his county at under-age level. He lost three Ulster Under-21 Football Championship finals.

Then, at the age of twenty, McGuinness's successor Rory Gallagher called McHugh into the team in 2015. He started Gallagher's first match in charge, a 2015 Dr McKenna Cup away defeat to Derry. Later the same month, McHugh contracted meningitis, was unable to leave his bed on the morning after playing Fermanagh, and his weight went from eleven to nine stone: "That was pretty much the season gone… I tried to play with Donegal U21s, tried to play with the seniors, but I'd lost that much weight it ruined my season, ruled me out", he was later quoted by The Irish News. In the 2015 National Football League, he was limited to two late substitute appearances against Monaghan and Kerry. He started the fifth fixture against Kerry at Austin Stack Park and contributed 0–4. Donegal qualified for the NFL semi-final. McHugh started this game but was substituted in the second half.

McHugh, having overcome his meningitis, was more involved with his county team in the 2016 season; he started the first four games of the 2016 National Football League, against Down, Cork, Mayo and Kerry. He also started the fifth fixture against Roscommon and scored a point. He then started against Dublin in the sixth fixture at Croke Park. He also scored a point against Monaghan in the seventh fixture but later went off injured. Donegal qualified for the NFL semi-final. McHugh did not play in this game.

McHugh started the final of the 2016 Ulster Senior Football Championship and played most of that game. He had earlier scored two points in the quarter-final against Fermanagh, one point in the semi-final (drawn game) against Monaghan and also played in the semi-final replay. McHugh scored 0–2 in the 2016 All-Ireland Senior Football Championship qualifier defeat of Cork at Croke Park. He then started against Dublin in the next game, at the same venue. He was awarded an Irish News All Star for his performances during the 2016 season.

McHugh made a substitute appearance in the opening fixture of the 2017 National Football League against Kerry and scored 0–1. He scored the winning point in injury time away to Roscommon in the second fixture, a victory which provided his team with their first points of the season. He started the third fixture against Dublin. He started the fourth fixture against Cavan and scored 1–1. He started the fifth fixture against Tyrone and scored 0–1. He did likewise in the sixth fixture against Monaghan. He made a substitute appearance in the seventh fixture against Mayo.

During the 2017 Ulster Senior Football Championship, he made a substitute appearance against Antrim in the quarter-final and played in most of the semi-final defeat to Tyrone. He also started both the 2017 All-Ireland Senior Football Championship qualifier defeat of Meath at Páirc Tailteann and the qualifier loss to Galway at Markievicz Park.

McHugh did not play for Donegal in the 2018 season. He wished to complete his studies at Ulster University Jordanstown. He graduated in marketing. He then went to the United States. There, he won the Boston Senior Football Championship with Donegal Boston.

Under the management of Declan Bonner, McHugh returned ahead of the 2019 season, with a noticeably stronger physique, playing in the opening McKenna Cup game against Queen's University Belfast.

He made a late substitute appearance against Meath in the second fixture of the 2019 National Football League, scoring a point. He made another substitute appearance in the fourth fixture against Fermanagh. doing likewise in the fifth fixture against Armagh, the sixth fixture against Cork and the seventh fixture against Kildare. Donegal qualified for the National Football League Division 2 final and McHugh made a substitute appearance in the game as Donegal defeated Meath to win the title.

He did not feature in the final of the 2019 Ulster Senior Football Championship, which Donegal won. However, he featured as a late substitute against Fermanagh in the quarter-final, then started and scored a point in his team's semi-final win over Tyrone. He was one of the few players to receive a first Ulster Senior Football Championship medal and the only non-rookie yet to receive an Ulster medal of any kind (Jason McGee had an Ulster Minor Football Championship medal).

McHugh started Donegal's first three fixtures of the 2020 National Football League against Mayo, Meath and Galway. He made substitute appearances against Dublin and Monaghan in the next two fixtures. Then the COVID-19 pandemic brought play to a halt. Play resumed behind closed doors on 18 October with a home game against Tyrone; McHugh did not feature in that game. He made a substitute appearance in the concluding game of the league campaign, away to Kerry. McHugh made an early substitute appearance in the 2020 Ulster Senior Football Championship quarter-final victory against Tyrone. He started the semi-final victory against Armagh. He also started the Ulster final against Cavan in what proved to be the season's concluding game for his team.

McHugh made substitute appearances in each of Donegal's first three fixtures of the 2021 National Football League, against Tyrone, Monaghan and Armagh, scoring one point against Monaghan. He started the 2021 National Football League semi-final against Dublin.

== Personal life ==
McHugh went to Boston in 2018 aware that he would have a job in marketing at AIB in Dublin when he returned to Ireland. In mid-2019, he went back to live in Kilcar and took up the post of Marketing and Regulations Manager at Ocean Knowledge there. His cousin and (teammate at club and with county) Ryan McHugh also works there. Ocean Knowledge makes two kinds of fertilsers from a western Ireland (mostly Donegal) based seaweed known as Ascophyllum Nodosum. This is then distributed internationally to sports venues, such as stadiums and golf courses for use on their grass. Among the venues which deal with Ocean Knowledge are the Bernabeu, Croke Park and London's Emirates Stadium.

The McHugh cousins, Eoin and Ryan, often play golf together.

Both his parents died following a traffic collision in August 2026.

== Honours ==
Donegal

- Ulster Senior Football Championship: 2019, 2025
- National Football League Division 2: 2019

Cill Chartha

- Comórtas Peile na Gaeltachta: 2024 (c)
- Donegal Senior Football Championship: 2017
- Donegal Minor Football Championship: 2012

Donegal Boston

- Boston Senior Football Championship: 2018

Individual

- Irish News All Star: 2016
- Donegal Minor Football Championship Man of the Match: 2012
