= 2016 Donegal county football team season =

Donegal county football team
2016 season
- Stadium: MacCumhaill Park, Ballybofey
- NFL D1: Semi-finalist
- All-Ireland SFC: Quarter-finalist
- Ulster SFC: Finalist

The following is a summary of Donegal county football team's 2016 season.

== Personnel changes ==
Brendan Kilcoyne replaced Gary McDaid on the management team. Kilcoyne's appointment as a team selector was announced in November 2015. Maxi Curran was also said to be involved in team preparations ahead of the 2016 Dr McKenna Cup, alongside Gallagher, Kilcoyne and Jack Cooney.

Twelve players were added ahead of the season: Eoghan Bán Gallagher, Ciarán Thompson, Stephen McMenamin, Caolan McGonagle, Tony McClenaghan, Kieran Gillespie, Michael Carroll, Stephen McBrearty, Jack O'Brien (Naomh Muire), Danny Rodgers (An Clochán Liath; goalkeeper), Rory Carr (St Eunan's) and Caolan Ward. Ward was the eldest of those additions. O'Brien played for Donegal in the 2016 National Football League semi-final against Dublin at Croke Park.

Paul Durcan emigrated to Qatar at the end of the previous season.

== Kit ==
The 'KN Group' began appearing as title sponsor on the front of player shirts, while the 'MCR Group' became Tier 2 sponsors, thus featuring on the back of player shirts.

== Competitions ==
=== National Football League Division 1 ===
The fixtures were announced on 16 November 2015.

==== Table ====
Compete in Division 1 semi-finals
Automatic relegation to Division 2

Team	Pld	W	D	L	F	A	Diff	Pts
Dublin	7	7	0	0	8-91	4-75	28	14
Kerry	7	5	0	2	5-109	5-77	32	10
Roscommon	7	4	0	3	9-98	8-77	24	8
Donegal	7	3	0	4	8-84	6-78	12	6
Mayo	7	3	0	4	5-88	7-91	-9	6
Monaghan	7	3	0	4	6-83	7-91	-11	6
Cork	7	3	0	4	9-89	9-105	-16	6
Down	7	0	0	7	2-60	6-108	-60	0

^{1}Donegal, Mayo, Monaghan and Cork are ranked by scoring difference.

==== Fixtures ====
30/01/16; Round 1	Down	0-7 - 3-15	Donegal	Páirc Esler, Newry; Referee: D Gough
30/01/16; Round 1	D O'Hare (0-4), A McConville (0-2), C McGovern (0-1)	Report	M Murphy (0-8), P McBrearty (1-3), R McHugh (2-0), L McLoone (0-2), C Thompson (0-1), F McGlynn (0-1)	Páirc Esler, Newry; Referee: D Gough

07/02/16; Round 2	Donegal	2-14 - 1-7	Cork	Fr Tierney Park, Ballyshannon; Referee: J McQuillan
07/02/16; Round 2	O MacNiallais (1-4), P McBrearty (0-4), M O'Reilly (1-1), A Thompson (0-2), C Thompson (0-1), F McGlynn (0-1), M Murphy (0-1)	Report	D Goulding (0-5), D Og Hodnett (1-0), B O'Driscoll (0-1)	Fr Tierney Park, Ballyshannon; Referee: J McQuillan

28/02/16; Round 3	Donegal	1-14 - 1-12	Mayo	MacCumhail Park, Ballybofey; Referee: B Cassidy
28/02/16; Round 3	M Murphy (0-5), P McBrearty (0-4), L McLoone (1-0), O MacNiallais (0-2), R McHugh (0-2), R Kavanagh (0-1)	Report	E Regan (0-4), D O'Connor (1-0), R Hennelly (0-2), A O'Shea (0-1), B Harrison (0-1), C Loftus (0-1), L Keegan (0-1), S Nally (0-1), S O'Shea (0-1)	MacCumhail Park, Ballybofey; Referee: B Cassidy

06/03/16; Round 4	Kerry	1-13 - 1-8	Donegal	Austin Stack Park, Tralee; Attendance: 7,056; Referee: E Kinsella
06/03/16; Round 4	B Sheehan (0-8), D Walsh (0-3), P Crowley (1-0), BJ Keane (0-1), C Cooper (0-1)	Report	M Murphy (1-4), P McBrearty (0-3), N Gallagher (0-1)	Austin Stack Park, Tralee; Attendance: 7,056; Referee: E Kinsella

13/03/16; Round 5	Donegal	0-17 - 1-19	Roscommon	O'Donnell Park, Letterkenny; Referee: P Hughes
13/03/16; Round 5	M Murphy (0-7), P McBrearty (0-6), C Toye (0-1), E McHugh (0-1), O MacNiallais (0-1), R McHugh (0-1)	Report	C Murtagh (0-6), F Cregg (0-5), C Cregg (1-2), N Daly (0-3), C Daly (0-1), C Devaney (0-1), E Smith (0-1)	O'Donnell Park, Letterkenny; Referee: P Hughes

26/03/16; Round 6	Dublin	1-10 - 0-7	Donegal	Croke Park, Dublin; Referee: C Lane; Man of the Match: Kevin McManamon
26/03/16; Round 6	C Costello (0-3), K McManamon (0-3), P McMahon (1-0), B Fenton (0-1), C Kilkenny (0-1), D Rock (0-1), P Andrews (0-1)	Report	P McBrearty (0-3), E McGee (0-1), M Murphy (0-1), O MacNiallais (0-1), R Kavanagh (0-1)	Croke Park, Dublin; Referee: C Lane; Man of the Match: Kevin McManamon

03/04/16; Round 7	Monaghan	1-10 - 1-9	Donegal	St Tiernach's Park, Clones; Referee: R Hickey
03/04/16; Round 7	C McManus (0-6), D McKenna (1-1), C Walshe (0-1), D Hughes (0-1), R McAnespie (0-1)	Report	M Murphy (0-3), M McElhinney (1-0), P McBrearty (0-2), A Thompson (0-1), E McHugh (0-1), O MacNiallais (0-1), R McHugh (0-1)	St Tiernach's Park, Clones; Referee: R Hickey

10/04/16; 4:00 pm Semi-final	Dublin	1-20 - 0-13	Donegal	Croke Park, Dublin; Referee: M Deegan; Man of the Match: Ciaran Kilkenny
10/04/16; 4:00 pm Semi-final	D Rock (0-5), B Brogan (1-2), C Kilkenny (0-3), P Mannion (0-2), P Andrews (0-2), P McMahon (0-1), J Cooper (0-1), J McCarthy (0-1), J Small (0-1), C Costello (0-1), E Lowndes (0-1)	Report	P McBrearty (0-8), M Murphy (0-4), M McElhinney (0-1)	Croke Park, Dublin; Referee: M Deegan; Man of the Match: Ciaran Kilkenny

=== Ulster Senior Football Championship ===
The draw for the 2016 Ulster Senior Football Championship took place on 15 October 2015.

==== Bracket ====
Preliminary round
Fermanagh	1-12
Antrim	0-9

Quarter-finals
Derry	0-12
Tyrone	3-14
Cavan	2-16
Armagh	0-14
Monaghan	2-22
Down	0-09
Donegal	2-12
Fermanagh	0-11

Semi-finals
Tyrone (R)	0-16; 5-18
Cavan (R)	3-07; 2-17
Monaghan (R)	0-14; 2-10
Donegal (R)	1-11; 0-17

Final
Tyrone	0-13
Donegal	0-11

==== Fixtures ====
12 June 2016
14:00
Quarter-Final

Donegal	2-12 – 0-11	Fermanagh
O MacNiallais (2-1), P McBrearty (0-3), E McHugh, M O'Reilly (0-2 each), M McElhinney, C McFadden, F McGlynn, M Murphy (0-1 each)	Report	T Corrigan (0-7), E Donnelly, B Mulrone, R Jones, S Quigley (0-1 each)

MacCumhaill Park, Ballybofey
Attendance: 15,908
Referee: Maurice Deegan (Laois)
25 June 2016
19:00
Semi-Final

Monaghan	0-14 – 1-11	Donegal
C McManus (0-8), C McCarthy, K O’Connell (0-2 each), S Carey, O Duffy (0-1 each)	Report	P McBrearty (0-5), M Murphy (0-3), O MacNiallais (1-0), K Lacey, E McHugh, C Toye (0-1 each)

Breffni Park, Cavan
Attendance: 16,287
Referee: Ciaran Branagan (Down)
2 July 2016
19:00
Semi-Final
Replay

Monaghan	2-10 – 0-17	Donegal
C McManus (1-4), S Carey (1-1), J McCarron (0-2), C Boyle, O Duffy, C Walshe (0-1 each)	Report	M Murphy (0-5), P McBrearty (0-4), M O’Reilly (0-3), R Kavanagh, M McElhinney, F McGlynn, M McHugh, A Thompson (0-1 each)

Breffni Park, Cavan
Attendance: 17,174
Referee: Maurice Deegan (Laois)
17 July 2016
14:00
Final

Tyrone	0-13 – 0-11	Donegal
S Cavanagh (0-3), P Harte, N Morgan (0-2 each), R Brennan, C McCarron, D McCurry, C McGeary, C McShane, N Sludden (0-1 each)	Report	P McBrearty, R McHugh (0-3 each), O MacNiallais, M Murphy (0-2 each), C Toye (0-1)

St Tiernach's Park, Clones
Attendance: 33,433
Referee: David Coldrick (Meath)

=== All-Ireland Senior Football Championship ===
30 July 2016; 4.00 PM; Round 4B	Cork	1-15 – 0-21	Donegal	Croke Park; Attendance: 27,615; Referee: P Neilan (Roscommon)
30 July 2016; 4.00 PM; Round 4B	Paul Kerrigan 1-1, Colm O’Driscoll, Tom Clancy (Clonakilty), Kevin O’Driscoll, Colm O’Neill (0-1f), Donncha O’Connor 0-2 each, Mark Collins, Tomás Clancy (Fermoy), Seán Powter, Aidan Walsh 0-1 each	Report	Patrick McBrearty 0-11 (0-4f), Ryan McHugh 0-3, Eoin McHugh, Michael Murphy (0-1f) 0-2 each, Karl Lacey, Frank McGlynn, Odhrán MacNiallais 0-1 each.	Croke Park; Attendance: 27,615; Referee: P Neilan (Roscommon)

6 August; 6.00 PM	Dublin	1-15 – 1-10	Donegal	Croke Park, Dublin; Referee: C Branagan (Down); Man of the Match: Ciaran Kilkenny (Castleknock)
6 August; 6.00 PM	D Rock (0-5f), P Mannion (1-1), D Connolly, K McManamon, P McMahon (0-2 each), P Andrews, C Kilkenny, J Cooper (0-1 each)	Report	M Murphy (0-6 5f, 1 45), R McHugh (1-0), P McBrearty (0-3, 2f), A Thompson (0-1)	Croke Park, Dublin; Referee: C Branagan (Down); Man of the Match: Ciaran Kilkenny (Castleknock)

== Management team ==
- Selector: Brendan Kilcoyne
- Coach: Jack Cooney
- Strength and conditioning coach: Paul Fisher
- Goalkeeping coach: James Gallagher

== Awards ==
=== All Stars ===
Ryan McHugh won an All Star, the county's 32nd. Paddy McGrath and Patrick McBrearty were also nominated.

Pos.	Player	Team	Appearances
GK	David Clarke	Mayo	1
RCB	Brendan Harrison	Mayo	1
FB	Jonny Cooper	Dublin	1
LCB	Philly McMahon	Dublin	2
RWB	Lee Keegan^{FOTY}	Mayo	4
CB	Colm Boyle	Mayo	3
LWB	Ryan McHugh	Donegal	1
MD	Brian Fenton	Dublin	2
MD	Mattie Donnelly	Tyrone	2
RWF	Peter Harte	Tyrone	1
CF	Diarmuid Connolly	Dublin	2
LWF	Ciarán Kilkenny	Dublin	2
RCF	Dean Rock	Dublin	1
FF	Michael Quinlivan	Tipperary	1
LCF	Paul Geaney	Kerry	1

County breakdown

- Dublin = 6
- Mayo = 4
- Tyrone = 2
- Donegal = 1
- Kerry = 1
- Tipperary = 1

== Notes ==
A team captained by Jason McGee, and including Mark Curran, Enda McCormick, Odhrán McFadden-Ferry, Eoghan McGettigan, Peadar Mogan, Gavin Mulreany and Niall O'Donnell, advanced to the 2016 All-Ireland Minor Football Championship semi-final on 21 August. O'Donnell was also joint-captain of the minor team with McGee.
