= Conor Morrison (Gaelic footballer) =

Irish Gaelic footballer

Personal information
- Born: 1995 or 1996 (age 29–30)
- Occupation: Mechanical engineer

Sport
- Sport: Gaelic football
- Position: Corner Back
Club
- Years: Club
- 201?–: St Eunan's
Club titles
- Donegal titles: 2
College
- Years: College
- c. 2020: DCU
College titles
- Sigerson titles: 1
Inter-county
- Years: County
- 201?–: Donegal

Conor Morrison (born 1995 or 1996) is an Irish Gaelic footballer who plays for St Eunan's and the Donegal county team.

== Education ==
Morrison attended St Eunan's College, studying for his Leaving Certificate in 2013–14. He commenced the final year of his engineering degree at Dublin City University (DCU) in 2019, commuting from Dublin for club training.

Morrison played for DCU in the Sigerson Cup, winning the trophy in 2020. He completed his degree and qualified as a mechanical engineer later that year, receiving an undergraduate position with Mercury Engineering in Leixlip, County Kildare.

He has a background in athletics and cross country.

== Playing career ==
=== Club ===
Morrison won the 2014 Donegal Senior Football Championship with his club. He then played against Roslea Shamrocks in the quarter-final and Omagh in the semi-final of the 2014 Ulster Senior Club Football Championship, scoring a point in the latter.

Morrison then won the 2024 Donegal Senior Football Championship with his club.

=== Inter-county ===
Under the management of Rory Gallagher, Morrison was named as a replacement for the 2017 Ulster Senior Football Championship match against Antrim.

Under the management of Declan Bonner, Morrison played the full final of the 2018 Dr McKenna Cup, which Donegal won and ended Tyrone's six-year streak of wins.

Morrison started against Tyrone and Monaghan in the 2018 National Football League, completing both games. He also came on as a substitute against Mayo in the same competition. His game-time was limited, first by concussion then by a fractured ankle sustained during a training session following the league game against Kildare (in which he did not play).

Morrison started against Clare and Meath (regular fixture, not the final) in the 2019 National Football League, completing both games. He did not feature in any further games, as Donegal won the National Football League Division 2 title.

In April 2019, it was reported that Morrison had left the Donegal panel. He thus missed Donegal's 2019 Ulster Senior Football Championship title win.

He returned to the Donegal senior panel ahead of the 2020 Dr McKenna Cup.

Morrison made one substitute appearance for Donegal in the 2020 National Football League, in the opening fixture against Mayo. Then the COVID-19 pandemic brought play to a halt.

With play resuming locally in August, Morrison sustained another injury while performing for his club at Fintra during the 2020 Donegal Senior Football Championship (Round 3 of the League Stage) and was stretchered from the field of play. He later described the experience as follows: "It was August 16. When I went down, there was a pop and a sort of tear. And you just know. Usually, you get a bang and you think about getting back up. I knew I wasn't getting back up. There was just that amount of pain". On his injuries, he said: "The damage that the MRI disc revealed was… there was cartilage damage, damage to the LCL… Both the LCL and ACL… were ruptured, the MCL… and lateral meniscus were both torn. I'd a fracture to my kneecap, a small tear to the bottom of the hamstring…there was a long list of things really".

This list then became even longer when Morrison discovered he had tested COVID-19 positive on a September Monday night in Santry before a scheduled operation to repair his leg injury. He was asymptomatic and self-isolated in Donegal, then his operation went ahead in October, indicating he was COVID-19 negative at this time (six weeks after the positive test).

== Style of play ==
Donegal senior manager Declan Bonner described Morrison as follows in one of his newspaper columns in 2020: "I've worked with Conor since he was 16, and I don't know if I've ever come across anyone who revels in stopping opposition players more than he does".

After Donegal's exit from the 2019 All-Ireland Senior Football Championship, former player Brendan Devenney noted Morrison's earlier departure from the panel as follows: "We don't have a centre half back, we don't have a full-back and we're short an out and out corner-back… Where young Conor Morrison went, I'm not sure… We hopefully will have another look at [him]. He looked like a tigerish corner-back".

== Honours ==
Donegal

- National Football League Division 2: 2019

^ Morrison played the opening two fixtures only.

- Dr McKenna Cup: 2018

St Eunan's

- Donegal Senior Football Championship: 2014, 2024

DCU

- Sigerson Cup: 2020
