= Comórtas Peile na Gaeltachta =

Irish Gaelic football competition

- Irish: Comórtas Peile na Gaeltachta
- Founded: 1969 –
- Trophy: Corn an Aire (seniors); Corn Ghael Linn (juniors); Corn na mBan (women)
- Title holders: Gaoth Dobhair (9th title)
- Most titles: Gaoth Dobhair (9 titles)
- Sponsors: Coillte

Comórtas Peile na Gaeltachta is an annual All Ireland Gaelic football competition contested by clubs from the Irish language-speaking Gaeltacht areas of Ireland. Clubs compete on a county-basis at first, in order to qualify for the tournament that is hosted by a different club from the Gaeltacht each year. The first competition was held in Gweedore, County Donegal in 1969 and was won by the local club CLG Ghaoth Dobhair. RTÉ Raidió na Gaeltachta provides radio coverage of both the regional qualifiers and the national finals, held over the June Bank Holiday. TG4 provides live television coverage of the men's semi-finals and finals on the June Bank Holiday Sunday and Monday, and these are also broadcast online.

== History ==
The idea for the competition came about in 1968 at University College Dublin when both Antoin Ó Cearúill from CLG Ghaoth Dobhair and Antoin de Bairéad from An Ghaeltacht GAA were playing on the UCD Gaelic football team who won the Sigerson Cup. They were good friends and decided that their home teams should play each other, de Bairéad brought his team from Baile an Fheirtéaraigh to Ó Cearúil's Gaoth Dobhair to play in a friendly. On the 5 January 1969, "in a blizzard" of snow as the Derry People/Donegal News said, Baile an Fheirtéaraigh GAA won against Gaoth Dobhair by 3–6 to 0–3. Antoin de Bairéad himself scored two points on the day. That evening at a celebratory cabaret in Óstán Radharc na Mara, Antoin de Bairéad, Antoin Ó Cearúill, Seán Delap and Feardorcha Ó Colla decided that there should be a competition between the Gaeltacht areas similar to the Sigerson Cup. Sean Delap said he would provide a trophy.

On 15 March 1969 the first official meeting for Cómórtas Peile na Gaeltachta was held in the Castle Hotel, Dublin. The following officers were elected:

- President: Seán Delap, Gaoth Dobhair.
- Vice President: Commandant Seán Ó Colmáin, An Daingean.
- Chair: Antoin de Bairéad, Baile an Fheirtéaraigh.
- Secretary: Feardorcha Ó Colla, Gaoth Dobhair.
- Treasurer: Séamus Mac Gearailt, Corca Dhuibhne.

On 23 May 1969 the competition was officially launched at the Gresham Hotel. Justice Seán Delap donated the trophy and Canon Hamilton from County Clare donated the 72 Medals.

The inaugural competition was held in Gweedore, County Donegal on 3 August 1969. There was 8 teams present from 6 counties: one from Dún na nGall, Gaillimh, Port Láirge and an Mhí and two teams from Maigh Eo and Ciarraí. The local club Gaoth Dobhair being crowned as champions against Baile an Fheirtéaraigh by 2–8 to 2–7. From 1975 onwards, the competition has also been contested at junior level.

The 2010 champions were Béal an Mhuirthead from Mayo at senior level, who won the tournament on home ground, and An Spidéal at junior level. Cloich Cheannfhaola from An Fál Carrach in Donegal hosted and subsequently won the 2011 senior title, beating Maigh Cuilinn of Galway in the final on a scoreline of 0-11 to 1-6. At junior level, Naomh Muire from the Rosses in Donegal won the title by beating Laochra Loch Lao of Belfast on a scoreline of 0-14 to 0-13.

The 2012 competition was held in Gaoth Dobhair, who are the joint most successful club in the competition's history. They managed to win the tournament outright on home soil also, the third consecutive team to do so. They beat Mayo's Cill tSéadhna, a team who remarkably made the final after three games in two days. Even more remarkably, they scored a total of 17 goals in 4 games (15 of them in the first 3 games). Gaoth Dobhair, however, were by far the superior team over the weekend. They won the final on a scoreline of 1–13 to 2–9. An estimated crowd of 10,000 attended the picturesque coastal region for the finals.

The Waterford club Rinn Ó gCuanach CLG hosted the competition in 2013, having last hosted it in 1999. The Kerry teams An Ghaeltacht and Lios Póil won the senior and junior finals respectively that year.

The 2017 finals of Comórtas Peile na Gaeltachta were played at Lough Mask for the first time at Tuar Mhic Éadaigh, County Mayo.

The 2020 Comórtas Peile na Gaeltachta which was planned to be hosted by Naomh Anna, Leitir Móir, was deferred in response to government guidelines to deal with the COVID-19 pandemic in Ireland.

== Senior Championship 1969–2026 ==
Year	Host	Winners	Runners-up
2026	Cill Chartha	Gaoth Dobhair 2-13	Bhulf Tón 1-09
2025	Ráth Cairn - Clann na nGael	Bhulf Tón 2-18	An Tearmann 3-12
2024	Cill Na Martra	Cill Chartha 0-20	Leitir Móir 1-08
2023	Naomh Muire	Bhulf Tón 2-7	Naomh Conaill 0-12
2022	Leitir Móir	Béal Átha’n Ghaorthaidh 2-10	Naomh Conaill 0-11
2021	Not completed due to the impact of the COVID-19 pandemic on Gaelic games		
2020	Not completed due to the impact of the COVID-19 pandemic on Gaelic games		
2019	Gallaras	An Ghaeltacht 0–12	Cill Chartha 0–11
2018	Na Dúnaibh	Bhulf Tón 3-09	An Cheathrú Rua 2-07
2017	Tuar Mhic Éadaigh	An Ghaeltacht 4–17	Cill na Martra 1–11
2016	Baile Bhúirne	Naomh Conaill 1–16	An Ghaeltacht 2-08
2015	Ard an Rátha	Naomh Conaill 1–11	Cill Chartha 0-06
2014	Maigh Cuilinn	Cíll Chartha 3–14	Micheál Breathnach 0–13
2013	An Rinn	Gaoth Dobhair	An Rinn
2012	Gaoth Dobhair	Gaoth Dobhair	Cill tSéadhna
2011	Cloich Cheann Fhaola	Cloich Cheann Fhaola 0-11	Maigh Cuilinn 1-06
2010	Béal an Mhuirthid	Béal an Mhuirthid	Ard an Rátha
2009	Rosmuc	Ard an Rátha	Carna Caiseal
2008	Naomh Columba	Cill Chartha	Naomh Columba
2007	Beal Átha an Ghaorthaigh	Gaoth Dobhair	Tuar Mhic Éadaigh
2006	An Spidéal	Béal an Mhuirthead	Micheál Breathnach
2005	Cill Na Martra	Naomh Abán	Gaoth Dobhair
2004	Cill Chartha	Gaoth Dobhair	Cill tSéadhna
2003	Baile Bhúirne	Naomh Abán	An Cheathrú Rua
2002	Leitir Móir	Gaoth Dobhair	Naomh Abán
2001	Piarsaigh na Dromada	Clochán Liath	Naomh Abán
2000	Cill tSéadhna	Naomh Abán	Cill Chartha
1999	An Rinn	An Ghaeltacht	Naomh Abán
1998	Cloich Cheanfhaola	Ard an Rátha	Cloich Cheann Fhaola
1997	An Cheathrú Rua	An Cheathrú Rua	Corca Dhuibhne
1996	Baile Bhúirne	Corca Dhuibhne	Naomh Abán
1995	An Fhairche	Corca Dhuibhne	An Fhairche
1994	Gaoth Dobhair	Gaoth Dobhair	An Cheathrú Rua
1993	Ráth Cairn	Cloich Cheann Fhaola	Leitir Móir
1992	Indreabhán	Cloich Cheann Fhaola	An Cheathrú Rua
1991	Beal Átha Ghaothaigh	Cill Chartha	Maigh Cuilinn
1990	Gallaras	Cill Chartha	Corca Dhuibhne
1989	Gleann Cholm Cille	Cill Chartha	Naomh Columba
1988	An Cheathrú Rua	Múscraí	Cill Chartha
1987	Béal an Mhuirthid	Cill Chartha	An Fhairche
1986	Na Dúnaibh	Gleann Cholm Cille	An Fhairche
1985	Gallaras	Béal an Mhuirthid	Corca Dhuibhne
1984	An Rinn	Béal an Mhuirthid	Ard an Rátha
1983	Gaoth Dobhair	Na Dúnaibh	Béal an Mhuirthid
1982	Gaoth Dobhair	Naomh Abán	Béal an Mhuirthid
1981	Indreabhán	Naomh Abán	Naomh Ciarán
1980	An Fhairche	Naomh Abán	An Fhairche
1979	Baile Bhúirne	Naomh Abán	Corca Dhuibhne
1978	Gleann Cholm Cille	Gleann Cholm Cille	An Fhairche
1977	Daingean Uí Chúis	Na hAghasaigh	Naomh Abán
1976	An Cheathrú Rua	Gaoth Dobhair	Naomh Abán
1975	Gaoth Dobhair	Naomh Abán	Leitir Móir
1974	Baile Bhúirne	Na hAghasaigh	Naomh Conaill
1973	An Cheathrú Rua	Maigh Eo	Gaoth Dobhair
1972	Daingean Uí Chúis	Na hAghasaigh	Naomh Abán
1971	Baile Bhúirne	Maigh Cuilinn	Naomh Abán
1970	Gaoth Dobhair	Conamara	Naomh Abán
1969	Gaoth Dobhair	Gaoth Dobhair	Baile an Fheirtéaraigh

== Results by team ==
Results by team
Team	Wins	First final won	Last final won	Runners-up	Last final lost	Total final appearances
Gaoth Dobhar	9			2		
Naomh Abán	8			9		
Cill Chartha	7			4		
Corca Dhuihbne (Na hAghasaigh)	5			5		
Béal an Mhuirthid	4			2		
An Ghaeltacht	3			1		
Cloich Cheann Fhaola	3			1		
Bhulf Tón	3			1		
Naomh Conaill	2			3		
Beal Áthan Ghaorthaidh	1			0		

== Junior Championship 1975–2026 ==
Year	Winners	Runners-up
2026	Gaeil Fhánada 2-18	Tuar Mhic Éadaigh 3-09
2025	Clann na nGael 2-21	Naomh Náille 0-15
2024	Naomh Muire 3-13	Lios Póil 2-10
2023	Cill Chomain 0-14	Gaoth Dobhair 1-08
2022	Gaeil Fhánada 2-11	Cill Chomain 2-10
2021	Not completed due to the impact of the COVID-19 pandemic on Gaelic games	
2020	Not completed due to the impact of the COVID-19 pandemic on Gaelic games	
2019	Na Dúnaibh 2-12	Béal Átha’n Ghaorthaidh 1-04
2018	Na Dúnaibh	Gaeil Fhánada
2017	Naomh Náille 2-14	Tuar Mhic Éadaigh 2-08
2016	Na Dúnaibh 2-09	Renvyle 0-12
2015	Oileaín Árann	Na Dúnaibh
2014	Oileaín Árann 0-15	Moindearg, London 0-9
2013	Gaeil Fhánada	Oileaín Árainn
2012	An Tearmann	Naomh Náille
2011	Naomh Muire 0-14	Laochra Loch Lao 0-13
2010	An Spideál	Piarsaigh Na Dromoda
2009	Oileaín Árainn	Na Piarsaigh
2008	An Rinn	Piarsaigh Na Dromoda
2007	Naomh Muire 1-07	Acaill 0-7
2006	Micheál Breathnach	Gaeil Fhánada
2005	Lios Póil	Cill Chomain
2004	Béal an Mhuirthead	Na Dúnaibh
2003	Lios Póil	Béal an Mhuirthead
2002	Béal Átha’n Ghaorthaidh	An Rinn
2001	Piarsaigh Na Dromoda	Tuar Mhic Éadaigh
2000	Mícheál Breathnach	Tuar Mhic Éadaigh
1999	Lios Póil	Béal Átha’n Ghaorthaidh
1998	Piarsaigh Na Dromoda	Béal Átha’n Ghaorthaidh
1997	Piarsaigh Na Dromoda	Naomh Columba B
1996	Mícheál Breathnach	Naomh Mícheál (Dún na gGall)
1995	Béal Átha’n Ghaorthaidh	Carna – Caiseal
1994	Piarsaigh Na Dromoda	Naomh Muire
1993	Rath Cairn	An Rinn
1992	Béal Átha’n Ghaorthaidh	Acaill
1991	Béal Átha’n Ghaorthaidh	Clann Chol. Mhuire
1990	Corca Dhuibhne	Piarsaigh Na Dromoda
1989	Cill Chartha	Na Piarsaigh
1988	Rath Cairn	Tuar Mhic Éadaigh
1987	Naomh Anna, Leitir Móir	Gaoth Dobhair
1986	An Clochán Liath	Rath Cairn
1985	N. Micheál, Béal na Sceilg	Béal Átha’n Ghaorthaidh
1984	Béal Átha’n Ghaorthaidh	Clann Chol. Mhuire
1983	Tuar Mhic Éadaigh	An Cheathru Rua
1982	Na Dúnaibh	Cloich Cheanfhaola
1981	Na Dúnaibh	Naomh Micheál
1980	N.Micheál, Baile na Sceilg	Tuar Mhic Éadaigh
1979	N. Micheál, Baile na Sceilg	Gleann Fhinne
1978	Carna	Naomh Mícheál
1977	An Fhairche	C.L.Bréanann
1976	Gleann Cholm Cille	
1975	Cill Chartha	

== An Cailín Gaelach winners ==
Year	National	Place
2026	Lucy de hÍde - Naomh Abán	Ellie Ní hÉigeartaigh - Cill Chartha
2025	Ailbe Seoighe - An Cheathrú Rua	Aíne Ní Chullaigh - Clann na nGael
2024	Ríona Ní Chuirrín - Carna Caiseal	Rachel Ní Dheasuna - Cill Na Martra
2023	Coleen Ní Fhaoláin - Cill Na Martra	Katie Nic a Bhaird - Naomh Muire
2022	Eabha Ní Chathasaigh - Carna Caiseal	
2021	Not completed due to the impact of the COVID-19 pandemic on Gaelic games	
2020	Not completed due to the impact of the COVID-19 pandemic on Gaelic games	
2019	Joanne Ní Cheallaigh - Gaoth Dobhair	
2018	Clíona Ní Ghallachóir - Gaoth Dobhair	
2017	Sheona Ní Mháille - Tuar Mhic Éadaigh	
2016	Eimear Ní Mhurchu - Cill Na Martra	
2015	Aoife Ní Mheachair - Naomh Abán	
2014	Siobhán Nic Fhlannchadha - Maigh Cuilinn	
2013	Deirdre Nic Fhlannchadha - Ráth Cairn	
2012	Rachel Ní Fhearraigh - Gaoth Dobhair	Eibhlín Ni Cheanainn – Cloich Cheannfhaola
2011	Brídín Ní Mhaoldomhnaigh - Gaoth Dobhair	Brídín Ní Mhaoldomhnaigh - Gaoth Dobhair
2010	Gráinne Ní hÓllain - L. Loch Laoi	Maire Nic Giolla Easbuig – C.L.
2009	Róise Nic Corraidh – L. Loch Laoi	R. Nic Eamarcaigh -An Tearmann
2008	Edel Ní Chnáimhsí – Gaoth Dobhair	Edel Ni Cnáimhsí -Gaoth Dobhair
2007	Máire R. Ní Fhlatharta – An C. Rua	Áine Ní Riagáin -N. Chonaill.
2006	Orla Ní Shuilleabháin - Clann na nGael	Gráinne Ní Bhaoill - An Tearmann
2005	Maire Ní Bheolain – An Ghaeltacht	Maire Áine Ní hIcí - Gaoth Dobhair
2004	Máirín Ní Fhlatharta - Clann na nGael	Bríd Ní Gallchóir - Gaoth Dobhair
2003	Aine Ní Shuilleabháin - Naomh Abán	Sarah Ní Gallchóir -Gaoth Dobhair
2002	Maire Ánna Ní Iarnain – L. Mór	
2001	Sinéad Ní Chonchúir – P. na Dromoda	
2000	Máire Ní Fhlatharta – Spidéal	
1999	Michelle Ní Ghrianna - Naomh Muire	Michelle Ní Ghrianna - Naomh Muire
1998	Sinéad Ní Mhaille – T. M.Éadaigh	Paula Ní Dhuibhir – Gaoth Dobhair
1997	Deirdre Ní Churraoin – Móin Dearg	
1996	Mairín Ní Mhurchú – Cill tSéadna	
1995	Caithríona Nic Fhionnghaile- Gaoth Dobhair	
1994	Martina Ní Chanáin - N. Columba	Martina Ní Chanáin – N Columba
1993	Celia Ní Fhatharta- M. Breathnach	
1992	Eibhlín Seoige – Ros Muc	
1991	Tríona Ní Ráinne – Leitir Mór	
1990	Bláthnaid Ní Chofaigh – R. Cairn	
1989	Dearbhla Ní Churraoin - N. Columba	Máire Níc Aoidh – Ard A’ Rátha
1988	Máire Ní Chathaláin – C. Dhuibhne	
1987	Mairéad Ní Neachtain – Leitir Mór	
1986	Mairéad Ní Cheilleachair – Muigheo	Bríd Ní Mhaoileoin – Na Dúnaibh
1985	Caitlín Criotháin – Corca Dhuibhne	
1984	Bernadette Ní Mhaolagain Gaoth Dobhair	Bernadette Ní Mhaolagain- Gaoth Dobhair
1983	Máire Ní Dhonnacha – An Cheathru Rua	
1982	Bríd Úna Ní Mhaoileoin – Corca Dhuibhne	
1981	Siubhán Ní Mhaoileoin – B Átha	
1980	Diane Ní Dhiscín – An Fhairce	
1979	Maire Treasa Ní Chéide- M. Breath.	
1978	Mairéad Ní Bhaoill	Mairéad Ní Bhaoill – Naomh Columba
1977	Mairéad Ní Dhonnachadha - C.Duibhne	
1976	Maire Ní Cheallaigh - An Spideal	
1975	Máire Nic Giolla Easpaig - N. Columba	Máire Nic G. Easpaig - N. Columba
1974	Siúbhan Ní Dhabharan - Maigh Cuilinn	
1973	Caitlín Ní Chonghaile - Rath Chairn	
1972	Deirdre Ní Dhonnacha - An Spideal	
1971	Máirín Ní Bhaoill - Gaoth Dobhair	Máirín Ní Bhaoill- Gaoth Dobhair
1970	Bairbre Ní Mhéalóid - Rath Chairn	
