= Paddy McConigley =

Donegal Gaelic footballer

Personal information
- Occupations: Carpenter; Piscicultural worker

Sport
- Sport: Gaelic football
Clubs
- Years: Club
- Gaeil Fhánada; Tír Chonaill Gaels; Railyard
Inter-county
- Years: County
- 200?–200? 200?–2007: London; Donegal
Inter-county titles
- NFL: 1

Paddy McConigley is an Irish Gaelic footballer who played for Donegal county team and, before that, the London county team. He currently plays for The Railyard Football Club in Kilkenny, where he has won two Kilkenny Senior Football Championship titles, in 2015 and 2016.

He is originally from Fanad.

== Playing career ==
=== Club ===
McConigley's club Gaeil Fhánada lost the 2006 Donegal Intermediate Football Championship final to Cloich Cheann Fhaola after two replays. However, the club won the Division 2 title with a win against Seán Mac Cumhaills.

While in London, McConigley played for Tír Chonaill Gaels. He marked Michael Donnellan in an All-Ireland Senior Club Football Championship quarter-final, losing by around four points.

After his inter-county career ended, McConigley continued to play with his club and won a Donegal Intermediate Football Championship in 2009. He won an All-Ireland Gaeltacht title in 2012.

He played club football in Donegal until the conclusion of the 2014 season, then he and his family relocated to Kilkenny and he began playing for Railyard.

=== Inter-county ===
McConigley captained the Donegal minor team and played for three years with the under-21 team, captaining them for two of those. He first featured at senior level under the management of Mickey Moran. However, the local fish farm did not provide with work continually throughout the year so he moved to London, England. While there he played for the London county team. London played Donegal in 2006 and then Donegal manager Brian McIver asked McConigley if he would be returning to Ireland. He did. After impressing with Gaeil Fhánada (see above), McConigley was invited for a trial with the county team and was included on the panel. He did not start the opening game of the 2007 National Football League (away to Cork at Páirc Uí Rinn) but came on as a substitute in the second game (at home against Mayo in Ballybofey). He held onto his place in the team after this. With Barry Dunnion occupying the other wing, McConigley had to see off competition from future All-Ireland winners Eamon McGee, Frank McGlynn and Anthony Thompson. He started at right half-back in the NFL semi-final against Kildare at Croke Park but came off injured after 35 minutes. McConigley also started in the final, again against Mayo. He was a late inclusion for that game, instead of Thomas Donoghue. Eamon McGee came as a substitute for McConigley. Months later, while on a team bonding trip in Milford, McConigley was shot in the eye and blinded. His vision never recovered and he never played for Donegal again. The incident occurred after the 2007 All-Ireland Senior Football Championship qualifier against Westmeath and before the qualifier against Monaghan "It probably was a defining monent in my career to be honest", he said later.

== Personal life ==
McConigley is married to Siobhan. He has three sons .
