= Martin Shovlin =

Donegal Gaelic footballer

Personal information
- Born: 1960 or 1961 (age 65–66)
- Occupation: Eircom employee

Sport
- Sport: Gaelic football
Club
- Years: Club
- 19??–: Naomh Ultan
Inter-county
- Years: County
- 19??–?: Donegal
Inter-county titles
- Ulster titles: 2
- All-Irelands: 1

Martin Shovlin (born 1960/1) is an Irish former Gaelic footballer who played for Naomh Ultan and the Donegal county team.

He played against Armagh and scored a point in the 1990 Ulster final, won by Donegal. His performance led him to be awarded the Ulster GAA Writers' Player of the Year.

He was part of Donegal's successful 1992 All-Ireland Senior Football Championship team. He started the semi-final against Mayo at Croke Park. However, he did not play in the final; he had sustained a stiff neck injury which was still affecting him on the morning of the final. John Joe Doherty took his place in the team. Donegal captain Anthony Molloy singled Shovlin out for a special mention in his victory speech.

Earlier that year, Hogan Stand indicated that: "Even objective observers of the game in Donegal recognised that the Shovlin, Gavigan and Reid combination probably represented the best lie of defence in the country. The Dublin trio of Curran, Carr and Heery were the only other combination which vied for that tag, it was suggested".

Shovlin was still playing for Naomh Ultan as recently as 2021.
