= Martin Caulfield =

Irish Gaelic footballer

Sport
- Sport: Gaelic football
- Position: Forward
Club
- Years: Club
- ?–200?: Na Rossa
Inter-county
- Years: County
- c. 2000s–200?: Donegal

Martin Caulfield is an Irish former Gaelic footballer who played for Na Rossa and the Donegal county team.

He made a substitute appearance in Mickey Moran's first game in charge, a league victory at home to Offaly. He was a former Donegal player by 2008.

He later emigrated.

He also played for Donegal Boston.
