= CLG Naomh Ultan =

Donegal-based Gaelic football club

Naomh Ultan
- CLG Naomh Ultan
- Founded: 1974
- County: Donegal
- Colours: Black and amber
- Grounds: Páirc Naomh Ultan

Playing kits
Standard colours

CLG Naomh Ultan is a Gaelic football club serving Dunkineely, Bruckless and the surrounding area in the south of County Donegal, Ireland. The modern club was established in 1974, reviving a Gaelic football tradition in the Dunkineely area dating to the 1920s. The club's colours are black and amber and its home ground is Páirc Naomh Ultan in Dunkineely.

== History ==
=== Early Gaelic football in Dunkineely ===
Gaelic football was being played in the Dunkineely area by the 1920s. A parish league involving teams from Dunkineely, St John's Point, Croagh and Fintra was established around 1924, while Dunkineely was affiliated with the GAA by 1926.

In 1935, a meeting was held in Dunkineely with the intention of entering a team in the Donegal Junior Football Championship. The entry was too late for that year's competition and Dunkineely instead competed in the 1936 championship. The team won the county Junior title, although the final against Letterkenny was not played until 1937.

Until 1952, the Killybegs and Killaghtee parishes were combined for Gaelic football purposes. A separate Dunkineely club was subsequently formed and competed during the 1950s. In 1958, Dunkineely won the St Connell Cup, defeating Kilcar by 2–2 to 1–3 in the final. The club disbanded in 1959 following a decline in playing numbers, with emigration a significant factor.

=== Formation of Naomh Ultan ===
On 11 October 1974, a meeting was held in St Mary's Hall, Dunkineely, with the aim of reviving the GAA club in the area. At a general meeting on 5 January 1975, Fr P. Cunningham proposed that the club be named after Saint Ultan and the club subsequently became known as Naomh Ultan.

Black and amber, the colours traditionally associated with the earlier Dunkineely club, were adopted as the club colours. Naomh Ultan played its first competitive match on 13 April 1975 against Glenfin at Fintra, as its own playing field was not ready for the beginning of the season.

=== 1980s ===
Naomh Ultan's first adult county success came in 1983 when the club won the 1982–83 Division 3 Junior Shield. The club also won the Division 3 League in 1983, completing the league campaign without dropping a point.

In 1984, Naomh Ultan won the Donegal Intermediate Football Championship for the first time, defeating Kilcar by 1–5 to 0–5 in the final at MacCumhaill Park. It was the first county championship won by a team from Dunkineely since the Junior Championship success of 1936.

Naomh Ultan won the Division 2 League in 1985, securing promotion to Division 1 following a 3–11 to 0–8 victory over Glenfin. The club later reached Intermediate Championship finals in 1989 and 1992.

=== 1990s ===
Naomh Ultan reached another Intermediate Championship final in 1998. The club's reserve team also contested Intermediate Reserve Championship finals during the decade.

In 1997, the senior team won the Division 3 League and regained its place in Division 2, while the reserve team won the Division 3 Reserve League.

The reserve team won the Intermediate Reserve Football Championship for the first time in 1999. The first final against Downings ended in a 1–5 to 1–5 draw before Naomh Ultan won the replay by 0–14 to 0–11 after extra time at MacCumhaill Park. The reserve side also won the Division 2 Reserve League that year.

=== 2000s ===
In 2002, Naomh Ultan completed an Intermediate Championship double at MacCumhaill Park. The reserve team defeated Urris by 1–6 to 0–7 to win the Intermediate Reserve Football Championship before the senior team defeated Buncrana by 2–4 to 0–8 to win the Donegal Intermediate Football Championship for the second time.

The Intermediate Championship victory saw Naomh Ultan represent Donegal in the Ulster Intermediate Club Football Championship. The club was defeated by Tyrone champions Aghaloo by 1–14 to 1–10 after extra time in the quarter-final.

=== 2010s ===
The reserve team reached the Donegal Junior B Football Championship final in 2010, losing to Sean MacCumhaills by 2–10 to 2–9. Naomh Ultan returned to the final in 2011 and won the competition for the first time, defeating St Eunan's by 2–7 to 1–7 at Páirc Tír Chonaill in Donegal Town.

Naomh Ultan won the Junior B Championship for a second time in 2013, defeating Letterkenny Gaels by 2–9 to 0–9 in the final.

The senior team reached the Donegal Junior Football Championship final in 2014 before losing to Urris. Naomh Ultan returned to the final in 2015 against Red Hughs. The first game finished in a draw before Naomh Ultan won the replay by 2–6 to 2–5, with a late '45 securing the Dr McCloskey Cup.

The club also won the Division 4 League in 2015, completing a league and championship double.

=== 2020s ===
In 2022, Naomh Ultan's reserve team won the Donegal Junior B Football Championship for the third time, defeating Letterkenny Gaels by 3–6 to 0–12 in the final at O'Donnell Park.

Naomh Ultan marked the 50th anniversary of its 1974 revival in 2024. A programme of events was held over the August Bank Holiday weekend and the club published Naomh Ultan: A History of 50 Years, 1974–2024 to record the club's history.

== Páirc Naomh Ultan ==
Development of a permanent home ground was an objective from the formation of Naomh Ultan. The original playing field contained a pronounced slope, and a major redevelopment plan to upgrade and level the pitch was approved in 1990.

Work progressed through the 1990s. The redevelopment included drainage works, levelling, the spreading of approximately 3,000 tonnes of sand and almost 1,000 tonnes of topsoil, and reseeding of the playing surface.

Páirc Naomh Ultan was officially opened on 1 June 1997 in front of several hundred spectators. The opening was marked by a challenge match between Donegal and Roscommon, with Naomh Ultan player Martin Shovlin leading the Donegal team onto the new pitch.

Further development of the grounds included the construction of dressing-room and clubhouse facilities. From 2019, the club began another significant phase of development centred on additional training and community facilities.

A new training playing surface was constructed and, during 2023, the training-pitch facilities were completed with the installation of secure fencing and ball-stop netting. The pitch was brought into use for club teams. The club also developed a community walking track around Páirc Naomh Ultan. In 2022, Naomh Ultan received funding through the Sports Capital programme towards completion of the training pitch and development of the walking track.

In October 2024, Naomh Ultan was awarded further funding following a successful appeal under the Sports Capital and Equipment Programme. The funding was allocated towards the redevelopment of the main playing pitch.

The works included a new drainage system, a sand-based foundation, a new sports-grass playing surface, dugouts and associated improvements. The main-pitch redevelopment was completed during 2026. Further works included upgraded ball-stop netting and the development of a new spectator stand at Páirc Naomh Ultan.

== Notable players ==
- Martin Shovlin — former Donegal footballer and member of the county's 1992 All-Ireland Senior Football Championship-winning panel. He won the Ulster Senior Football Championship with Donegal in 1990 and 1992 and was named Donegal Player of the Year in 1986. Shovlin had been selected to play in the 1992 All-Ireland final but was ruled out on the morning of the match because of a neck injury.

== Honours ==
=== Naomh Ultan ===
- Donegal Intermediate Football Championship (2): 1984, 2002
- Donegal Intermediate Reserve Football Championship (2): 1999, 2002
- Donegal Junior Football Championship (1): 2015
- Donegal Junior B Football Championship (3): 2011, 2013, 2022
- Donegal All-County Football League Division 2 (1): 1985
- Donegal All-County Football League Division 3 (2): 1983, 1997
- Donegal All-County Football League Division 3 Reserve (1): 1997
- Donegal All-County Football League Division 2 Reserve (1): 1999
- Donegal All-County Football League Division 4 (1): 2015
- Donegal Division 3 Shield (1): 1983 (1982–83 competition)

=== Dunkineely club, pre-1974 ===
- Donegal Junior Football Championship (1): 1936
- St Connell Cup (1): 1958
