= Caolan McColgan =

Donegal Gaelic footballer

Personal information
- Born: 2002 or 2003 (age 23–24)
- Occupation: Student

Sport
- Sport: Gaelic football
- Position: Wing-back
Club
- Years: Club
- ?–: Naomh Pádraig Uisce Chaoin
Inter-county
- Years: County
- 2022–: Donegal
- Ulster titles: 2

Caolan McColgan (born 2002) is an Irish Gaelic footballer who plays for Naomh Pádraig Uisce Chaoin (Muff) and the Donegal county team. He plays at wing-back, but can also operate at corner-back.

== Playing career ==
=== Club ===
McColgan won a Donegal Junior Football Championship title with his club in 2024, scoring the second goal of the final against Carndonagh. He later played for his club in the 2024–25 All-Ireland Junior Club Football Championship final at Croke Park, scoring two points in the second half. Before this Naomh Pádraig Uisce Chaoin had defeated Tara in the quarter-final in London and Kilmurry of Cork on penalties in the semi-final, also played in Dublin.

In 2026 Caolan McColgan won a Donegal Intermediate Football Championship with his club, defeating Carndonagh by 1-16 v 0–18. Caolan McColgan scored 0-2 (two-pointer) in the final.

=== Inter-county ===
McColgan was part of a Donegal under-20 team that won the 2022 Leo Murphy Cup.

He made his senior inter-county debut against Antrim in the 2022 Dr McKenna Cup.

McColgan made his league debut for Donegal against Kerry in the opening fixture of the 2023 National Football League; Donegal defeated Kerry, with McColgan scoring 0–3 on his debut and being named man of the match. He was later included on the GAA.ie Football Team of the Week. Then he was nominated for Footballer of the Week. He won. McColgan started the second league fixture against Tyrone. He also started the third fixture against Monaghan, the fourth fixture against Galway and the fifth fixture against Armagh. Against Mayo, McColgan also started, playing in the number 4 jersey. However, he did not feature in the concluding fixture, against Roscommon.

McColgan started the 2023 Ulster Senior Football Championship quarter-final against Down. In Donegal's three games in Group 4 of the 2023 All-Ireland Senior Football Championship, McColgan made a substitute appearance against Clare and started the second and third games, against Derry and Monaghan. In the 2023 All-Ireland SFC preliminary quarter-final loss to Tyrone, McColgan started and scored 0–1.

In October 2023, it was confirmed that McColgan had had surgery in London to correct an injury to his hamstring.

== Personal life ==
As of January 2023, McColgan was a student at Belfast's Ulster University, where he was doing a business studies course.

== Honours ==
Donegal

- Ulster Senior Football Championship: 2024, 2025
- National Football League Division 2: 2024
- Leo Murphy Cup: 2022

Naomh Pádraig Uisce Chaoin

- Donegal Junior Football Championship: 2024
- Donegal Intermediate Football Championship: 2026
