= John Joe Doherty =

Irish Gaelic footballer and manager

Personal information
- Native name: Seán Seosamh Ó Dochartaigh (Irish)
- Born: Carrick, County Donegal
- Occupation: Businessman

Sport
- Sport: Gaelic football
- Position: Back
Club
- Years: Club
- 1980s–2000s: Naomh Columba
Club titles
- Donegal titles: 1
- Ulster titles: 0
- All-Ireland Titles: 0
Inter-county
- Years: County
- 1980s–1990s: Donegal
Inter-county titles
- Ulster titles: 2
- All-Irelands: 1
- NFL: 0
- All Stars: 1

John Joe Doherty (born 1968) is a former Irish Gaelic footballer and manager who played for Naomh Columba and the Donegal county team, later managing Donegal.

== Biography ==
He won the 1987 All-Ireland Under-21 Football Championship with Donegal.

He captained his club to the 1990 Donegal Senior Football Championship.

Doherty, having recovered from a bone he broke while playing with his club, started against Armagh in the 1990 Ulster Senior Football Championship final, won by Donegal. He was a member of the Donegal team that won the county's first All-Ireland Senior Football Championship in 1992. Martin Shovlin played instead of him in the semi-final against Mayo; however, Doherty started the final against Dublin. He was selected as an All Star in 1993. He believes it was his performance in the 1992–93 National Football League final in which Donegal drew nine points apiece with Dublin at Croke Park that led to him receiving the All Star; Doherty marked Charlie Redmond who proceeded to get himself sent off, as did Keith Barr shortly afterwards.

He was captain of his county team in 1998.

== Early life ==
After leaving Carrick National School, Doherty attended the local Vocational School. During his time in Carrick Vocational School he played on the schools senior team who were the first school in the county to win the Ulster Schools Markey Cup. Five years later, at the age of 22, he captained his local Naomh Columba Senior Team to their second county title in 1990.

In November 2008, following the resignation of the previous manager Brian McIver, Doherty was confirmed as the new Donegal senior manager. Doherty resigned in 2010; Jim McGuinness replaced him one month later.

He previously managed his club Naomh Columba, Naomh Mhura to a Donegal Junior Football Championship and the Donegal under-21 team.

== Honours ==
Donegal

- All-Ireland Senior Football Championship: 1992
- Ulster Senior Football Championship: 1990, 1992
- Dr McKenna Cup: 1991
- All-Ireland Under-21 Football Championship: 1987
- Ulster Under-21 Football Championship: 1987
- Ulster Minor Football Championship: 1985

Naomh Columba

- Donegal Senior Football Championship: 1990 (c.)

Individual

- All Star: 1993

Sporting positions
Preceded by Brian McIver	Donegal Senior Football Manager; 2008–2010	Succeeded by Jim McGuinness
