= CLG Gaeil Fhánada =

Donegal-based Gaelic games club

CLG Gaeil Fhánada is a Gaelic football club based in Portsalon in Fanad (Fánaid) County Donegal, Ireland. Their home ground is Páirc Uí Shiadhail located in Portsalon. The club has frequently used their secondary playing field in Trialough prior to Páirc Uí Shiadhail's establishment and during times when it was closed. The club does not participate in hurling or camogie.

== History ==
The club was founded in 1982 by a local group primarily led by Miah Shiels. The club began playing in Trialough, on the coast of north Fanad until 1994 when it opened their current ground, Páirc Uí Shiadhail in Portsalon where it established its home grounds, clubhouse and later a club gym. When opened in May 1994 by the CLG Dún na nGall club board, it hosted a game between the county's of Donegal & Mayo. The grounds still to this day, despite its lack of spectator capacity, is ranked in the top five surfaces in the county. Páirc Uí Shiadhail is also notable for being one of the few pitches in the world to not have 65 meter lines.

The club's first majority success was winning the 1985 Donegal Junior Men's Championship, after defeating CLG Sean Mac Cumhaills in the final. Gaeil Fhánada's side that day was captained by Colman Carr. In 1990 they would go on to win All-County League Division 4 title. In 1992 the club's first underage title was won by the U12, winning the U12 B County Title, defeating CLG Iorras in the final. The same year the club's Senior Quiz Team was the first Ulster team in history to win the National Final in Senior Scór. Their most recent quiz victory being their Senior county title success in 2025 with notable team members being Micheál Friel, Cathal McElwaine, Geard Patrick Shiels & Bernard McGettigan Sr.

In 1997 the men's side won the Donegal Junior Championship again after losing the 1993 final. In 2007 & 2009 the men's side won the Donegal Intermediate Championship, coming runner up in 2006 final, after the final went to a replay against CLG Cloich Cheann Fhaola. Gaeil Fhánada won the 2013 Comórtas Peile na Gaeltacht Sóisir Uile-Éireann title captained by Paddy & Mark 'Seán' McConigley in County Waterford, the club's first Comórtas Peile na Gaeltacht title.

The men's side won the 2014 Donegal Intermediate B Championship against CLG Cloich Cheann Fhaola. In 2017, Aidan ‘Murray’ McAteer was appointed manager of the senior men's team. The retired Gaeil Fhánada player, brought the side to the 2017 Donegal Intermediate Semifinal were the lost to CLG Naomh Náille and Peader Morgan in Páirc Uí Dhónaill in Letterkenny.

In 2018 the club experienced a great year. The ladies side won the Donegal Junior Championship in 2018. The men's side won the 2018 Comórtas na Peil na Gaeltacht Sóisir Tír Conaill against local rivals Na Dúnaibh in Ná Dúnaibh's home grounds. The two sides met again in 2018 the Comórtas na Peil na Gaeltacht Sóisir Uile-Éireann final, where Na Dúnaibh won 1–12 to 1–10. The men's side would go on to finish mid table in the All-County Division 3 League & get knocked out of the Donegal Intermediate Championship Quarterfinal by CLG Aodh Ruadh Béal Átha Seanaidh. However, the Minor Boys team would go on to win the ‘treble’ in 2018. Captained by centre back Matthew Gallagher, the side won the Donegal Northern Regional Board Division 2 League Minor Final in Downings against CLG Gaeil Leitir Ceanainn. The Donegal All-County League Minor Final at ‘The Burn Road’ against CLG Gleann Fhinne and the Donegal Division 2 Minor Championship Final in Convoy against CLG Chill Chartha with Gaeil Fhánada's number 10 Darren McElwaine from Muineagh hitting 1–3. The year ended in spectacular fashion with the North, South, East, West tournament took place. In the men's section, South beat a weak East team & North defeated a strong West team in the semifinals. Then, the South Ladies defeated the North Ladies in the Ladies Final, whilst afterwards the South Men's team defeated North by 1 point, scored at the end by Mark McAteer.

In 2019, Séamie ‘Coshia’ Friel represented the club for the Donegal Masters team. The minor side performed poorly. The men's side captained by Jimmy Coyle, were knocked out of the Comórtas na Peil na Gaeltacht Sinsir Tír Conaill First Round in Páirc Uí Shiadhail by CLG Gleann t Súilí. Then, in the Donegal All-County League Division 3 they avoided relegation, struggling without key player Michael Sweeney to injury. They would later fail to get past the group stage of the Donegal Intermediate Championship. The U21 side were defeated in the winter by An Tearmainn in the U21 B Quarter Final. The U14 girls won the Division 1 County Championship.

In 2020, after the COVID-19 restrictions were lifted, the men's side competed in the Donegal Northern Regional Board Division 2 League. They were later knocked out of the Donegal Intermediate Championship Quarterfinal by hosts CLG Bun Cranacha & Darach ‘Jigger’ O’Conner. The reserve side experienced several victories. Mulroy Gaels was re-established for the minor boys, were by Na Dúnaibh & Gaeil Fhánada came together to compete in the Donegal Northern Regional Board Division 1 League, were they were knocked out by CLG Naomh Ádhamainn. Conor McConigle would later leave the men's panel and was selected for London GAA Inter-County panel where he was a permanent member for several years. His brother Kevin continued to player for Gaeil Fhánada.

In 2021, the club started a Dads & Lads team that was short lived. The men's side battled hard to make it to the Donegal All-County League Division 3 Promotion Playoff but slimly lost to CLG Gaeil Leitir Ceanainn at the ‘Burn Road’. They would later get knocked out of the Donegal Intermediate Championship Quarterfinal once again by CLG Bun Cranacha, in Páirc Ó Dhónaill. The reserve side under Bernard McGettigan Sr. made it to the Donegal Division 3 B Final but lost to CLG Gaeil Leitir Ceanainn. The ladies side would make it to the Donegal Ladies Intermediate Final but lost to CLG Naomh Ádhamainn in Moyle Park. At underage, U21 side which consisted of the same group of men who won the 2018 Minor ‘Treble’ went of the hunt for U21 B glory. However they were knocked out by neighbours CLG Baile na nGallóglach at ‘The Bridge’. The U17 side captained by Aaron ‘Sean’ McConigley, won the Donegal Northern Regional Board League Championship Shield Final away to Naomh Mhuire Conmhaigh, after a man of the match performance by full forward Dylan McFadden. The U15 boys made it to the Donegal All-County Division 2 League Championship quarterfinal but lost away to CLG Iorras and now professional soccer goalkeeper Oisin Cooney, who scored double digits on the day.

In 2022, the men's side captained by Ryan ‘Red Bird’ McGonigle hosted & won the Comórtas na Peil na Gaeltacht Sóisir Tír Conaill in Páirc Uí Shiadhail, after beating Naomh Mhuire Íochtar Na Rossan in the final. They automatically got promoted in the league as the leagues were manually redrawn. They later go on to have a steady campaign in the Donegal All-County Division 2 League. They won the 2022 Comórtas na Peil na Gaeltacht Sóisir Uile-Éireann title after extra-time against Mayo's Cill Chomáin (2–10 to 2–11) in Leitir Móir, County Galway, the second time they won the competition. It was their most significant trophy at adult level for nearly a decade, having earlier contested the 2018 final against Downings and lost. They made it to the Donegal Intermediate Championship Semifinal in Páirc Mac Cumhaill were they experienced a heavy defeat to CLG Naomh Colmcille & the Doherty cousins. The reserve side would experience the same faith as they bowed out of the Donegal Intermediate B Championship Semifinal an hour before hand. At underage, the U21 side captained by Shaun Kerr, battled hard in the B championship defeating rivals CLG Na Dúnaibh away in the last minutes in the group stage, before being knocked out in the quarterfinal by CLG Aodh Ruadh Béal Átha Seanaidh. The U17 boys captained by Callum McAteer, would go on to reach the Donegal Northern Regional Board Division 2 League Final but lose to hosts CLG Gaoth Dobhair. The boys would later battle in the Donegal All-County Division 2 Championship but fail to reach the knockout stages. Key performances throughout the year from Seán ‘Joe’ Carr and forwards Killian Friel & Charlie McAteer kept them in touching distance. The U15 boys captained by Ciaran ‘Baker’ McElwaine had a poor campaign in both league & championship but retained the Anthony Blaney Memorial Cup which they have won consecutively from 2018 to 2023.

2023 saw the men's side lose key players Bernard McGettigan Jr. & Ryan McGonigle to injury. The side once again captained by Jimmy Coyle had an ok campaign in the Donegal All-County League Division 2. The side also made it to the Comórtas na Peil na Gaeltacht Sóisir Tír Conaill Semifinal but, with a weak squad out, lost to CLG Gaoth Dobahir Sóisir & Caoimhín Ó Casaide. They made it to the Donegal Intermediate Championship Semifinal but lost to CLG An Málainn in Páirc Ó Dhónaill. The reserve side failed to make it past the quarterfinal stage as they lost CLG Bun Cranacha in Convoy in the Donegal Intermediate B Championship. At underage, the U21 side made it to the U21 B quarterfinal but lost to CLG Cloich Cheann Fhaola away. The U17 boys made it to the Donegal Northern Regional Board Final but lost to CLG Gaeil Leitir Ceanainn in Downings, which would mark the start of a long rivalry between the two sides at ‘Born in 2006/7 group’. The Donegal All-County Division 2 Cup did not go in the boys favour. The U15 boys after a long tough season won the Donegal All-County Division 5 Cup in Burt with a man of the match performance by 13 year old Jack Dunlevey.

2024 saw the men's lose to Naomh Mhuire away in the Comórtas na Peil na Gaeltacht Sóisir Tír Conaill in the quarterfinal. They would go on to have an ok Donegal All-County Division 2 League campaign. They would go on to avoid relegation after winning the relegation semifinal in the Donegal Intermediate Championship. The reserve side made it to the Donegal Intermediate B Championship quarterfinal after a poor Donegal All-County Division 2 B League performance. They would get knocked out by CLG An Málainn in Burt. At underage, the U21 side failed to make it out of the group stage of the U21 B Championship. The Minor boys captained by Jamie McAteer would make it to the Donegal Northern Regional Board Final but lost to CLG Gaeil Leitir Ceanainn in Downings. The boys would later lose the Donegal All-County Division 3 Cup Shield semifinal to CLG Gleann Fhinne away.

In 2025, the club started up a Mothers & Others team who even travelled to Philadelphia to play football. The men's side captained by Oisin Shiels would lose in the Comórtas na Peil na Gaeltacht Sóisir Tír Conaill semifinal to CLG Naomh Conaill's Sóisir side in Ardara. They would go on to have a disappointing campaign in the Donegal All-County Division 2 League, defeating CLG Naomh Bríd in the relegation/promotion playoff. In the Donegal Intermediate Championship they avoided relegation by defeating CLG Cloich Cheann Fhaola in the relegation semifinal in a high tempers affair in Moyle Park. The reserve side would experience a mixed league campaign in the Donegal All-County Division 2 B League. In the Donegal Intermediate B Championship they made it to the semifinal where they narrowly lost to CLG An Beart at ‘The Burn Road’. The Laides won the Dún na nGall Comórtas na Peil na Gaeltacht Idirmheánach na mBan Final against CLG Árd an Ratha away. The ladies would lose the All-Ireland Comórtas na Peil na Gaeltacht Idirmheánach na mBan Final in County Meath by a narrow margin. Nonetheless, the ladies won the Donegal Ladies Intermediate Championship. At underage, the U21 side captained by Conor Heraghty ended the Gaeil Fhánada U21 25 year long famine by winning the Donegal U21 D Championship Final in Lifford against CLG Realt Na Mara. The Minor boys captained by JP Gallagher would make it to the Donegal Northern Regional Board Division 3 League Final but failed to field.

In 2026, the Men's side left without a manager was captained by Shaun Kerr, defeated An Clochán Liath Sóisir in Towney in the final to win the Comórtas na Peil na Gaeltacht Tír Conaill, overcoming Naomh Micheál Sóisir, Gleann Fhinne Sóisir, Ard an Ratha Sóisir & Gleann t tSúilí Sóisir in the process. Then over the June Bank Holiday, they would go on to win the Comórtas na Peil na Gaeltacht Sóisir Uile-Éireann title after a come back final win. Both 35 year old Séamie ‘Nanny’ Friel & 38 year old super sub Michael Sweeney were named on the ‘Foireann an Chomórtais’. As Michael put it before the game “My hair is getting light and my legs tight”. The side ended their league campaign in July, finishing tenth. The reserves managed by Christy ‘Topher’ Sweeney captained by Michael McDevitt had a poor league, resulting in them finishing tenth as well.

As championship came into action, Christy Sweeney took up the unofficial role as manager for the seniors too, with Paul ‘Dougie’ Coyle, Paddy Heraghty & Oisin Shiels as his selectors. The seniors secured two wins from two against An Beart and Aodh Ruadh Cúil na gCuirridín before being hammered by Naomh Mhuire Íochtar Na Rossan at home. Two weeks later, after the sad passing of Charlie McAteer (Club President), the men went 2-02 to 0-00 down in the first ten minutes against neighbours Baile na nGallóglach and in a high tempered affair, crawled it back to a 6 point gap at half time and eventually securing a one point win in the dire minutes. They faced An Málainn in Páirc Ó Domhnaill in the Intermediate Quarter Final and while one point ahead in the 61st minute, the Fanad men conceded a 2pt free from 41m out and lost by 1 point.

The reserves had a tough championship with two wins from four getting them through to the Intermediate B Quarter Final in Páirc Ó Domhnaill against Bun Cranncha. They would trail by one at half time but unfortunately loose by 4 points.

Awards: Paddy Shiels Award (Senior Player Of The Year)

2018 - Oisin Shiels

2019 - Jimmy Coyle

2020 - Ryan ‘Red Bird’ McGonigle

2021 - Shaun Kerr

2022 - Bernard McGettigan Jr.

2023 - Paddy Carr

2024 - Odhrán Sheils

2025 - Ronan McAteer & Oisín Mac Pháidín

Young Senior Player Of The Year

2018 - Fergus Friel

2021 & 2022 - Liam ‘Bill’ McGrenaghan

2023 - Callum McAteer

2024 - Seán Joe Carr

2025 - Darragh O’Doherty

Reserve Player Of The Year

2018 - Paul ‘Dougie’ Coyle

2023 - Michael Sweeney

2024 - Aaron ‘Seán’ McConigley

2025 - Michael McDevitt

Reserve Young Player Of The Year

2018 - Brandon McClafferty

2022 - Conor Heraghty

2023 - Byran ‘Bull’ Gallagher

2024 - Jamie McAteer

2025 - Caolan McElwaine & JP Gallagher

Ladies Player Of The Year

2025 - Íseult Ní Mhathúana

Ladies Young Player Of The Year

2025 - Grace Beagley

== Notable players ==
- Paddy Carr — played for Donegal and later managed Kilmacud Crokes and Ballymun Kickhams, was nominated for Donegal manager several times before being appointed in 2022
- Paddy McConigley — 2007 National League winner

• Séamie ‘Coshia’ Friel (1994 - 2020)

• Michael Sweeney (2003 - 2026)

• Clare Friel (- 2026)

== Managers ==
Aidan McAteer (2017 - 2022 & 2025)

Geard Patrick Shiels (2023)

Finbar O’Neill (2024)

Christy ‘Topher’ Sweeney (2026)

== Honours ==
- Donegal Intermediate Football Championship (2): 2007, 2009
- Donegal Junior Football Championship (2): 1985, 1997
- Comórtas Peile na Gaeltachta Tír Conaill - Sóisearach (2): 2018, 2022
- Comórtas Peile na Gaeltachta na hÉireann - Sóisearach (2): 2013, 2022

• Donegal Ladies Intermediate Championship: 2025

• Donegal Ladies Junior Championship: 2018

• Comórtas Peile na Gaeltachta Tír Conaill Idirmheánach na mBan: 2025

• Donegal Intermediate B Championship: 2014
