= Donegal Junior Football Championship =

Annual Gaelic football competition

- Irish: Craobh Peil Sóisear Dhún na nGall
- Founded: 1932
- Title holders: Urris (6th title)
- Most titles: Castlefinn Robert Emmet's (7 titles)

The Donegal Junior Football Championship (abbreviated as Donegal JFC) is an annual football competition organised by Donegal GAA.

Urris won the 2026 decider defeating Na Rossa 2:16 to 1:12 in the Final.

== History ==
The competition has been won by 42 clubs, 24 of which have won it more than once. Castlefinn Robert Emmet's are the most successful club with seven titles to their credit.

Donegal senior footballer Marty Carlin scored 0–10 against Cill Chartha in the 1981 Donegal JFC final. Other men to have won this competition and to have played at senior level for their county include Caolan McColgan, with his 2024 title added to the Ulster Senior Football Championship medal he won with Donegal earlier that year.

Donegal county team manager Declan Bonner brought national attention to the competition when he lined out for his club Na Rossa in 2019, notably making saves while playing as goalkeeper when his team's regular goalkeeper transferred to New York.

== Honours ==
The winning club receives the Dr McCloskey Cup. The winning club is promoted to the Donegal Intermediate Football Championship for the following season.

The Donegal JFC winner qualifies for the Ulster Junior Club Football Championship. It is the only team from County Donegal to qualify for this competition. The Donegal JFC winner may enter the Ulster Junior Club Football Championship at either the preliminary round or the quarter-final stage. It often does well there, with the likes of Naomh Colmcille and Red Hugh's among the clubs from Donegal to win at least one Ulster Championship after winning the Donegal Junior Football Championship.

The Donegal JFC winner — by winning the Ulster Junior Club Football Championship — may qualify for the All-Ireland Junior Club Football Championship, at which it would enter at the semi-final stage, providing it hasn't been drawn to face the British champions in the quarter-finals. This is what happened to Naomh Pádraig Uisce Chaoin in the 2024–25 All-Ireland Junior Club Football Championship. The club defeated Tara in the quarter-final in London, then defeated Kilmurry of Cork on penalties in the semi-final, before losing the final at Croke Park.

== Winners and finalists ==
=== Results by team ===
Results by team
#	Team (Note: Titles for clubs based in the same area and with a common heritage are aggregated.)	Wins	Years won	Last final lost
1	Castlefinn / Robert Emmet's	7	1945, 1951, 1954, 1956, 1961, 1987, 2002	2008
2	Urris	6	1979, 1989, 1999, 2001, 2014,2026	2018
2	Convoy	6	1941, 1942, 1963, 1995, 2005, 2020	1992
2	Na Dúnaibh	6	1948, 1957, 1977, 2012, 2016, 2021	2020
3	Milford	4	1990, 2000, 2004, 2013	2012
3	Carndonagh	4	1950, 1952, 2008, 2025	2024
4	Erin's Hope (Stranorlar)	3	1932, 1944, 1955	—N/a
4	Cloich Cheann Fhaola	3	1938, 1939, 1959	1974
4	Donegal Town / Four Masters	3	1943, 1965, 1975	1968
4	Killygordon / Red Hugh's	3	1946, 1981, 2018	2017
4	St Naul's	3	1962, 1972, 1984	1954
4	Naomh Bríd	3	1986, 2003, 2006	2002
4	Naomh Colmcille	3	1994, 2010, 2017	1998
5	Glenties	2	1933, 1964	1963
5	Na Rossa	2	1982, 2023	2006
5	Dunkineely/Naomh Ultan	2	1936, 2015	2014
5	Bundoran	2	1960, 1966	1970
5	Ard an Rátha	2	1967, 1970	1980
5	Cill Chartha	2	1971, 1993	1989
5	St Michael's	2	1983, 1992	1971
5	Gaeil Fhánada	2	1985, 1997	1993
5	Buncrana	2	1988, 2019	—N/a
5	Naomh Muire	2	1991, 2007	2004
5	Moville	2	1996, 2009	2023
6	Rosses Rovers	1	1934	—N/a
6	Letterkenny Gaels	1	2022	2025
6	Gaoth Dobhair	1	1935	1982
6	An Clochán Liath	1	1937	1950
6	Dún Líonáin	1	1940	1943
6	Corlea	1	1947	1946
6	Liscooly	1	1949	—N/a
6	Inch	1	1958	1966
6	Mulroy Gaels	1	1968	—N/a
6	Ranafast	1	1969	—N/a
6	Termon	1	1973	1978
6	Naomh Columba	1	1974	1973
6	Na Cealla Beaga	1	1976	1975
6	Glenfin	1	1978	1977
6	St Eunan's	1	1980	1988
6	Malin	1	1998	1996
6	Burt	1	2011	—N/a
6	Naomh Pádraig Uisce Chaoin	1	2024	2016

=== Finals listed by year ===
Year	Winner	Score	Opponent	Score	Winning captain	Man of the match	Winning manager
1932	Erin's Hope (Stranorlar)	1-2	Glenties	0-4			
1933	Glenties	0-2	Townawilly	0-1			
1934	Rosses Rovers	1-6	Donegal Town	0-0			
1935	Gaoth Dobhair	4-3	Ard an Rátha	0-11			
1936	Dunkineely	3-5	Letterkenny	1-0			
1937	An Clochán Liath	3-2	Cashelard	1-0			
1938	Cloich Cheann Fhaola	2-3	Downstrands	0-5			
1939	Cloich Cheann Fhaola	1-5	Castlefinn	0-5			
1940	Dún Líonáin	4-1	Downstrands	2-4			
1941	Convoy	1-6	Belleek (Note: Fermanagh side Belleek contested the Donegal Junior final.)	0-4			
1942	Convoy	2-7	Kindrum	1-4			
1943 (Note: Donegal County Board awarded the junior title to Donegal Town although the referee had noted the final score as Dún Líonáin 2-5 Donegal Town 2-4.)	Donegal Town	2-4	Dún Líonáin	1-6			
1944	Erin's Hope (Stranorlar)	2-4	Bundoran	1-3			
1945	Castlefinn	1-8	Corlea	0-5			
1946	Killygordon	2-6	Corlea	0-3			
1947	Corlea	5-5	Na Dúnaibh	0-2			
1948	Na Dúnaibh	3-5	Cill Chartha	1-3			
1949	Liscooly	1-6	Glenties	0-7			
1950	Carndonagh	1-6	An Clochán Liath	1-2			
1951	Castlefinn	2-5	St Naul's	1-4			
1952	Carndonagh	2-7	Four Masters	1-0			
1953	Pettigo	3-3	St Michael's	3-2			
1954 (Note: Castlefinn awarded the final after St Naul's walked off the field with the score at St Naul's 1-1 Castlefinn 0-1.)	Castlefinn		St Naul's				
1955	Erin's Hope (Stranorlar)	2-12	Na Dúnaibh	0-1			
1956	Castlefinn	2-6	Bundoran	1-4			
1957	Na Dúnaibh	4-7	Letterkenny Lámh Dearg	3-2			
1958	Inch	1-6	Bundoran	0-4			
1959	Cloich Cheann Fhaola	4-7	Crossroads	0-2			
1960	Bundoran	4-7	Na Dúnaibh	1-1			
1961	Castlefinn	4-6	Creeslough	2-4			
1962	St Naul's	5-4	Creeslough	1-3			
1963	Convoy	2-7	Glenties	1-6			
1964	Glenties	1-9	Castlefinn	0-3			
1965	Four Masters	2-4	Ard an Rátha	1-6			
1966	Bundoran	6-6	Inch	1-2			
1967	Ard an Rátha	0-7	Convoy	0-5			
1968	Mulroy Gaels	2-11	Four Masters	0-5			
1969	Ranafast	2-9	St Michael's	0-10			
1970	Ard an Rátha	2-8	Bundoran	1-8			
1971	Cill Chartha	2-6	St Michael's	0-7			
1972	St Naul's	0-9	Naomh Columba	0-7			
1973	Termon	0-11	Naomh Columba	0-10			
1974	Naomh Columba	1-5	Cloich Cheann Fhaola	0-3			
1975	Four Masters	1-8	Na Cealla Beaga	1-6			
1976	Na Cealla Beaga	1-11	Termon	1-5			
1977	Na Dúnaibh	2-8	Glenfin	1-10			
1978	Glenfin	0-10	Termon	0-6			
1979	Urris	2-13	Gaoth Dobhair	1-2			
1980	St Eunan's	0-13	Ard an Rátha	0-5			
1981	Red Hugh's	2-14	Cill Chartha	0-4			
1982	Na Rossa	3-4	Gaoth Dobhair B	2-6			
1983	St Michael's	1-15	Milford	0-7			
1984	St Naul's	1-12	Convoy	2-6			
1985	Gaeil Fhánada	3-4	Seán Mac Cumhaills B	0-7			
1986	Naomh Bríd	0-9	Robert Emmet's	1-4			
1987	Robert Emmet's	1-9	Four Masters	1-3			
1988	Buncrana	3-6	St Eunan's B	1-6			
1989	Urris	3-7	Cill Chartha B	1-6			
1990	Milford	1-8	Convoy	1-6			
1991	Naomh Muire	2-13	Naomh Báithín	1-4			
1992	St Michael's	2-9	Convoy	0-9			
1993	Cill Chartha	2-7	Gaeil Fhánada	0-9			
1994	Naomh Colmcille	1-11	Naomh Mura	0-10			
1995	Convoy	2-9	Robert Emmet's	0-6			
1996	Moville	1-14	Malin	0-10			
1997	Gaeil Fhánada	0-16	Naomh Colmcille	0-12			
1998	Malin	0-13	Naomh Colmcille	0-9			
1999	Urris	2-10	Naomh Pádraig, Lifford	1-5			
2000	Milford	0-11	Glenswilly	0-10			
2001	Urris	0-10	Robert Emmet's	0-7			
2002	Robert Emmet's	1-16	Naomh Bríd	0-10			
2003	Naomh Bríd	1-7	Red Hugh's	0-8			
2004	Milford	0-13	Naomh Muire	0-12			
2005	Convoy	0-10	Naomh Pádraig, Lifford	0-6			
2006	Naomh Bríd	2-10	Na Rossa	0-6			
2007	Naomh Muire	0-8	Naomh Pádraig, Lifford	0-7			
2008	Carndonagh	0-11	Robert Emmet's	0-6			
2009	Moville	1-9	Milford	0-10			
2010	Naomh Colmcille	0-7	Naomh Pádraig, Muff	0-6			
2011	Burt	3-5	Naomh Pádraig, Lifford	1-3			
2012	Na Dúnaibh	0-10	Milford	0-5			
2013	Milford	2-9	Urris	2-6			
2014	Urris	2-9	Naomh Ultan	0-8			Danny Kelly
2015	Naomh Ultan	2-6	Red Hugh's	2-5			
2016	Na Dúnaibh	0-11	Naomh Pádraig, Muff	1-7			
2017	Naomh Colmcille	2-7	Red Hugh's	0-8			
2018	Red Hugh's	4-9	Urris	0-5			
2019	Buncrana	2-12	Letterkenny Gaels	2-8			
2020	Convoy	3-10	Na Dúnaibh	1-3			
2021	Na Dúnaibh	1-9	Letterkenny Gaels	0-3	Ben McNutt	Danny McBride	
2022	Letterkenny Gaels	0-12	Carndonagh	0-10	Conor Browne	Ronan Frain	Dougie Corbett
2023	Na Rossa	0-15	Moville	1-10	Daniel Martin	Aidan McHugh	Declan Bonner
2024	Naomh Pádraig Uisce Chaoin	2-12	Carndonagh	0-8	Dermot Keaveney	Caolan McColgan	Daniel McCauley
2025	Carndonagh	1-16	Letterkenny Gaels	1-12	Darragh Browne	Conor O'Donnell	Michael O'Donnell
