= Stephen Griffin =

Irish Gaelic footballer

Personal information
- Native name: Stiofáin Ó Gríofa (Irish)
- Born: Letterkenny, County Donegal

Sport
- Sport: Gaelic football
- Position: Right corner forward
Club
- Years: Club
- ?–?: St Naul's
Inter-county
- Years: County
- 200?–201?: Donegal
Inter-county titles
- Ulster titles: 2
- All-Irelands: 1

Stephen Griffin is a Gaelic footballer and manager who plays for, and has managed his club St Naul's and also, formerly, played for the Donegal county team.

He made his championship debut in 2008. In the 2009 championship, he played and scored [at least] one point against Carlow in their All-Ireland qualifier meeting, then came off the bench to score a goal against Cork in their All-Ireland quarter-final encounter at Croke Park.

He scored a goal from a "speculative lob" against Kildare in the 2010 National Football League. He also scored a goal against Tipperary, later in the same competition.

A member of the Donegal panel that won the 2012 All-Ireland Senior Football Championship Final against Mayo, he was an unused substitute in the final.

He sustained an injury while playing for hs club in the 2013 Donegal Intermediate Football Championship final and had to be substituted.

In the last round of 2015 National Football League fixtures against Mayo, Griffin came on as a substitute and scored the vital point that sent his county into the NFL semi-final at Mayo's expense.

He has acted as player–manager for his club, as well as having been captain.

== Honours ==
Donegal

- All-Ireland Senior Football Championship: 2012
- Ulster Senior Football Championship: 2012
