= Buncrana GAA =

Gaelic games club in County Donegal, Ireland

Buncrana
- Bun Cranncha
- County: Donegal
- Colours: Green, white and gold (Alternate Kit Blue & Black)
- Grounds: The Scarvey Field
- Coordinates: 55.130415°N 7.4541958°W

Playing kits
Standard colours	Alternate Kit

Buncrana GAA is a Gaelic Athletic Association club in Buncrana, County Donegal, Ireland. The club fields teams in both hurling and Gaelic football.

== History ==
In spite of a Gaelic games revival in the town of Buncrana in the 1940s, it would be over 40 years before Buncrana GAA Club had their first success at adult level when the Donegal JFC title was won after a 3–06 to 1–06 defeat of St Eunan's. The club secured senior status following Donegal IFC wins in 1995 and 2004. Buncrana won a second Donegal JFC title after a defeat of Letterkenny Gaels in 2019. A revival of hurling in the club resulted in the Donegal IHC being claimed for the first time after a defeat of Carndonagh in 2024.

== Honours ==
- Donegal Intermediate Hurling Championship (1): 2024
- Donegal Intermediate Football Championship (2): 1995, 2004
- Donegal Junior Football Championship (2): 1988, 2019

== Notable players ==
- Ryan Bradley: All-Ireland SFC winner (2012) and Ulster SFC winner (2011 and 2012)
- Caolan McGonagle: Ulster SFC winner (2018, 2019, 2024)
