= CLG Na Rossa =

Donegal-based Gaelic games club

- Founded: 1976
- County: Donegal
- Colours: White and Black
- Coordinates: 54°51′15″N 8°18′34″W

Playing kits
Standard colours

CLG Na Rossa is a Gaelic football only GAA club based in Leitir, County Donegal, Ireland. The club fields both men's and ladies' teams at underage to senior level.

== History ==
Na Rossa have won the Donegal Junior A Football Championship twice (1982 and 2023) and the Donegal Intermediate Football Championship twice (1989 and 1999).

Declan Bonner became player-manager with Na Rossa at the age of 23, his first managerial appointment. He did so having gone to the United States in 1988 and, having returned late, Donegal manager Tom Conaghan did not include him in the county panel for the following year. Bonner led Na Rossa to the 1989 Donegal Intermediate Football Championship, while also playing for them. Bonner's brothers Sean, Michael and Donal were also part of that Na Rossa team, while his brother Aidan — a minor — was a substitute. Brian McEniff took over as Donegal manager again at the end of 1989. McEniff recalled Bonner to the county team. Bonner would not manage Na Rossa again for some time.

Bonner went on to play in McEniff's 1992 All-Ireland Senior Football Championship-winning team, scoring four points in the final. His second spell as manager of the Donegal county football team ended in 2022, having taken over at the beginning of the 2018 season. He had previously served as manager from 1997 to 2000.

== Notable players ==
- Declan Bonner — 1992 All-Ireland SFC winning player; 2018 and 2019 Ulster SFC winning manager
- Martin Caulfield — county player
- Carl McHugh — later a professional soccer player

== Managers ==
Years	Manager
1976–1988	—N/a
1988–1989	Declan Bonner
1989/90–??	—N/a
c. 2008	Declan Bonner
200?–??	—N/a
2015	Damian Devaney
?–2018/9	Pat Caulfield
2018/9–present	Donal Trimble

== Honours ==
- Donegal Intermediate Football Championship: 1989, 1999
- Donegal Junior Football Championship: 1982, 2023
