= Maxi Curran =

Gaelic football manager

Personal information
- Native name: Macsaí Ó Currain (Irish)

Sport
- Sport: Gaelic football
Inter-county management
- Years: Team
- Donegal

Maxi Curran is a Gaelic football manager from Downings, County Donegal.

He attended Mulroy College in Milford for his secondary education.

Curran succeeded McGuinness as Donegal under-21 football team manager on 19 January 2012. He has also been manager of the Donegal under-16 and minor football teams and clubs County Donegal and County Tyrone. He has also been a manager in ladies' Gaelic football, but gave that up in 2023.

In Curran's first season as Donegal under-21 football team manager, Donegal were beaten in Ulster by Tyrone. Part of the 2012 All-Ireland Senior Football Championship final-winning team, he was with them when they appeared on The Late Late Show.

Curran took charge of Donegal for the 2013 Dr McKenna Cup. He resigned as a selector for the senior team in 2013. McGuinness ousted him.

As the club's first outside manager, Curran led St Eunan's to the 2014 Donegal SFC title and, in the process, became the first man from Downings with an SFC medal.

Curran was also said to be involved in senior team preparations ahead of the 2016 Dr McKenna Cup, alongside Jack Cooney, Rory Gallagher and Brendan Kilcoyne.

In December 2019, Curran was unveiled as manager of the Donegal Under-14 Academy Squad.

In November 2020, and ahead of the 2021 season, Curran took over as team trainer at the Gaoth Dobhair club under the management of Kevin Cassidy and Joe Duffy.

He succeeded Michael Murphy as manager of LYIT in 2022.

After a spell working with Truagh Gaels in the north of County Monaghan, he took over as manager of his native club Na Dúnaibh (Downings) for 2024, working alongside his brother Barney Curran. He managed Na Dúnaibh in the 2024 Donegal SFC. He continued to manage the club in 2025. He was announced as The Loup manager at the end of 2025.

Sporting positions
Preceded by Jim McGuinness	Donegal Under-21 Football Manager; 2012–2015	Succeeded by Declan Bonner
