= St Naul's GAA =

Donegal-based Gaelic games club

St Naul's
- Naomh Naille
- Founded: 1927
- County: Donegal
- Colours: Green And White
- Grounds: Páirc Gearóid O'Gallachóir

Playing kits
Standard colours

St Naul's is a Gaelic football club in the parish of Inver in County Donegal, Ireland.

They compete in the Donegal Intermediate Football Championship, having been relegated from the Senior Football Championship in 2025.

Several of the club's players have been involved with the Donegal county team.

Former Tánaiste Mary Coughlan has served as secretary of the club.

== History ==
St Naul's lost a relegation decider in 2025.

== Notable players ==
- Stephen Griffin — All-Ireland SFC winner
- Brendan McCole — 2020 Sigerson Cup winner
- Peadar Mogan — All Star
- Daniel Coughlan - Glencoagh (Last minute winner vs kilcar county final)

== Managers ==
Years	Manager
1927–2012	—
2013–2015	Brian McCabe (player-manager)
2016–2018	John McNulty
2019–2020	Barry Meehan
2021–2022	Brendan McGready, Patrick Burke and Brian McCabe
2023–2024	Stephen Griffin (player-manager)

- Eddie Brennan (date unknown).

== Honours ==
- Donegal Intermediate Football Championship (2): 2011, 2019
- Donegal Junior Football Championship (3): 1962, 1972, 1984
