= Declan Bonner =

Donegal Gaelic footballer and manager

Personal information
- Born: 11 August 1965 (age 61) An Clochán Liath, Ireland
- Occupation: Wine merchant
- Height: 5 ft 11 in (180 cm)

Sport
- Sport: Gaelic football
- Position: Right corner forward
Clubs
- Years: Club
- 1979– 1988: Na Rossa; Donegal Boston
Inter-county
Years	County	Apps (scores)
1983–1995	Donegal	110 (12–193)
Inter-county titles
- Ulster titles: 2
- All-Irelands: 1
- All Stars: 0
Club management
- Years: Club
- 1988–19?? ?–? c. 2006 ? c. 2023 2023–2025: Na Rossa; An Clochán Liath; Gaoth Dobhair; Na Rossa; Na Rossa; Erne Gaels
- 1
Inter-county management
- Years: Team
- 1997–2000 2017–2022 2025–: Donegal; Donegal; Fermanagh
Inter-county titles as manager
County	League	Province	All-Ireland
Donegal		2	2

Declan Bonner (born 11 August 1965) is an Irish Gaelic footballer and manager. He played at senior level for the Donegal county team, winning an All-Ireland Senior Football Championship title in 1992. He later managed the Donegal county team for two spells between 1997 and 2000 and 2017 and 2022, winning two Ulster Senior Football Championship titles during the latter, while playing as goalkeeper for Na Rossa.

Bonner's first spell as manager of the county team, from 1997 until 2000, saw him denied an Ulster Senior Football Championship title by a last-minute Joe Brolly goal in the 1998 final. After leading the county minor team to the 2014 All-Ireland Minor Football Championship final, Bonner was given a second chance at the senior job when a vacancy arose in 2017. Donegal had been left in a state of decline by his predecessor following the successful Jim McGuinness era. Bonner improved the team and led them to two Ulster Senior Football Championship titles, in 2018 and 2019, becoming only the second manager in team history (after McGuinness) to retain the title.

Bonner maintains prominent media roles in his native county, such as with Highland Radio. He contributes a weekly column called "[Making] No Bones About It[!]", which features on the inside back cover of the Donegal News.

== Early life ==
Bonner is from the Gaeltacht village of Lettermacaward in West Donegal. His father Dan Bonner was born on 20 September, the same date on which his son would win the 1992 All-Ireland Senior Football Championship final. Dan died in August 2013.

Bonner attended Rosses Community School. He was part of the school association football team which won the 1982 All-Ireland Under-16 title. He scored the goal in the 1–0 Ulster final win over Falcarragh CS. He scored it from the halfway line. In the All-Ireland semi-final the game went to penalties, with Rosses Community School advancing 3–1 and Bonner scoring one of those. Bonner was playing at centre back.

== Playing career ==
=== Club ===
Bonner plays for his local club Na Rossa. He is considered their "most famous son". He made his senior debut for his club at the age of 14 in 1979. At the age of 16 he was part of the team that won the 1982 Donegal Junior Football Championship. A week after leading Donegal to his first Ulster SFC as manager in 2018, Bonner kept a clean sheet while playing in goal in a league match for his club. He played his fortieth season in 2019, participating in the Donegal Junior Football Championship as an emergency goalkeeper. His brothers Sean, Michael, Donal and Aidan also played for the club. Sean also played in the full-back line when Donegal won the 1982 All-Ireland Under-21 Football Championship.

He won the under-12, under-14 (twice) and under-16 (twice) titles with Rosses Rovers. He is also a Donegal Boston past player.

As of 2020, he was chairman of his club.

=== Inter-county ===
Bonner made his National Football League debut for Donegal at the age of 18 in late-1983. Donegal had earlier won the 1983 Ulster Senior Football Championship, with Bonner still a minor and playing no part. He made his senior championship debut against Armagh in 1987.

However, Bonner went from playing every championship match to falling out with manager Tom Conaghan. This was after Bonner played for Boston in 1988 and, having returned late, Conaghan did not include him in the county panel for the remainder of the year or for the following year either. Bonner thus missed the 1989 Ulster SFC final. He began playing for League of Ireland soccer club Finn Harps in 1989, playing there at left-back until 1991. Conaghan's time as manager came to an end and Brian McEniff returned to the role in September 1989. McEniff restored Bonner to the team in time for the 1990 Ulster SFC. Bonner played against Armagh in the 1990 Ulster SFC final, won by Donegal, and scored 0–2 (including one free). He once played for Finn Harps against Cobh Ramblers on a Sunday at noon, then for Donegal against Longford in the National Football League on the same day in 1991.

Bonner scored 0–19 in the 1992 All-Ireland Senior Football Championship. That year Donegal qualified for the All-Ireland Senior Football Championship final for the first time in history. Bonner scored 0–4 of Donegal's total in the county's victory over Dublin in that game, and it was also he who scored the final point of the match. Upon doing so he clenched his fist, certain in the knowledge of victory. It is regarded as one of the most iconic moments in team history. He fell to the floor and was there when the referee blew the final whistle. But, within five years of raising aloft the Sam Maguire Cup, Bonner was forced to retire from the (inter-county) game due to injury.

He was seriously injured in the 1992–93 National Football League semi-final in which Donegal defeated Clare at Croke Park and spent several weeks in hospital. With Dublin playing Kerry in the other semi-final, the Dublin fans on Hill 16 took the opportunity to call Bonner unpleasant names as he was stretchered off.

Bonner played his last game for Donegal against Cavan in the 1997 Ulster SFC semi-final. As the second half of that game got underway, he had to go off briefly to have two cracked ribs treated. When he left Donegal were two points ahead. When he returned the game had begun to go in Cavan's favour. Cavan won and then went on to win the 1997 Ulster Senior Football Championship Final.

Bonner played in four Ulster SFC finals, recording two wins and two losses, an achievement he equalled as manager in 2020.

== Management career ==
"You can talk about management structures and methods until you're blue in the face, but what you need above everything else is a squad of players willing to buy into what you're doing. Anytime I go to take on a job, if I don't get that then I don't hang around. You have to demand that. There's no point in me giving it 120 per cent and some man landing to only put in 90 per cent. It doesn't work. When I go in, it's all or nothing".

— Bonner discussing his managerial philosophy in 2014

"Declan has a great way with him. He's a very good people person… A big part of a situation is doing things for people you like; things you wouldn't do for someone you didn't like. It's not about respect as such, it's just a genuine fondness for the guy".

— John Gildea credited Bonner for persisting with him in 1998 during a difficult time in his career

Bonner has been mentored in management by McEniff. Like McEniff, his management style is based around personal connection with his players.

=== Early club management ===
Bonner became player-manager with Na Rossa at the age of 23, his first managerial appointment. This was during his fall out with Donegal manager Tom Conaghan during which time Bonner was exiled from the county team. To pass his period of exile he led Na Rossa to the 1989 Donegal Intermediate Football Championship title, while also playing for that club. Bonner's brothers Sean, Michael and Donal were also part of that Na Rossa team, while his brother Aidan — a minor — was a substitute. McEniff took over as Donegal manager again at the end of 1989. McEniff recalled Bonner to the county team. Bonner would not manage Na Rossa again for some time.

=== Inter-county ===
Bonner managed the Donegal county football team at senior level between 1997 and 2000. He was called the day after Cavan won the 1997 Ulster Senior Football Championship final to ask about submitting his name for the role. He began on his 32nd birthday, within four weeks of retirement. He was informed of the decision to appoint him at 9.29 pm on 11 August 1997, after Anthony Molloy, past manager Conaghan and Pauric McShea all withdrew. Charlie Mulgrew and Matt Gallagher were part of Bonner's management team. Bonner led Donegal to the 1997–98 National Football League semi-final against eventual title winners Offaly and the 1998 Ulster SFC final against Derry — a last-minute Joe Brolly goal, accompanied by a few kisses to the crowd, put paid to that one.

=== Return to club management ===
Bonner managed Gaoth Dobhair to the 2006 Donegal Senior Football Championship title. He coached Carl McHugh, the professional footballer, at Na Rossa. He also managed An Clochán Liath. He managed his club Na Rossa to the 2008 Donegal Intermediate Football Championship final, but lost to Seán Mac Cumhaills by three points (he was not playing at the time).

Bonner sought a joint managerial position with the senior footballers alongside Charlie Mulgrew in 2008, but both ultimately lost out to John Joe Doherty.

=== Return to inter-county management ===
"If you keep putting excuses in the way then you won't have success. All I was listening to was excuses. People were coming up saying 'the colleges in Donegal aren't good enough', 'Derry and Tyrone are so far ahead of us', 'we just don't have the resources'. In the past, Donegal minor teams were beaten before they went out. When we came in and started to win at under-16 level the players saw and realised that they weren't far away".

— Bonner, speaking in 2014 while county minor manager

In 2011, Bonner went to assist Paddy Hegarty with a South Donegal development squad. This, he later explained, was the start of his "accidental" return to inter-county management.

Bonner won the (Ulster under-16) Buncrana Cup in 2012. He then won the (Ulster under-17) Jim McGuigan Cup. In mid-2013, Bonner was appointed manager of the Donegal minor team. He managed the county team to the 2014 Ulster Minor Football Championship; then to a first ever All-Ireland Minor Football Championship final, against Kerry. He was not afforded a meeting with his predecessor as county minor manager, a decision he criticised in 2017 when he wrote in the Donegal News that such a meeting should be mandatory.

When Jim McGuinness departed as county manager after the 2014 All-Ireland Senior Football Championship Final, Bonner was linked with the managerial vacancy.

In 2015, Bonner was appointed manager of the Donegal under-21 team. He managed the county team to an Ulster Under-21 Football Championship in 2017, defeating Derry in the final. However, he was critical of the Ulster Council for not allowing them sufficient time to prepare for the All-Ireland semi-final, which they lost to Dublin. While managing the Donegal under-21 team, Bonner was linked with the vacant Cavan senior post in October 2016.

On 22 September 2017, Bonner was reappointed manager of the senior team on a three-year term, succeeding Rory Gallagher. Shortly before the appointment, Bonner wrote in the Donegal News: "We were a top tier team, but we have dropped down over the last year or two, and I can't see that changing unless we start to have a serious look at our structures from Under 15 right up to seniors, and the way we conduct our business". Bonner's appointment was not universally welcomed. However, it brought about a marked improvement in the team's fortunes and Bonner led his county to the 2018 and 2019 Ulster Senior Football Championship titles. While managing Donegal, he returned to line out for his club at JFC level, notably making saves while playing as goalkeeper when his team's regular goalkeeper transferred to New York.

Bonner was reappointed for another two-year term as Donegal manager at the end of August 2021 when no other candidates emerged to succeed him.

He left the role in July 2022.

=== Club management and Fermanagh ===
Bonner managed Na Rossa to the 2023 Donegal Junior Football Championship title, with his two sons Cillian and Christian among the players involved.

As 2023 drew to a close, Bonner was appointed manager of Erne Gaels. He led Erne Gaels to consecutive Fermanagh SFC titles in 2024 and 2025, and in the 2025 Ulster Senior Club Football Championship, led the club to a first win at this level, against Kingscourt Stars. In between he was appointed manager of Fermanagh, succeeding Kieran Donnelly.

== Personal life ==
Bonner married Catherine in 1990 and had four children. He took her to Austria for the honeymoon.

== Honours ==
=== Player ===
Donegal

- All-Ireland Senior Football Championship: 1992
- Ulster Senior Football Championship: 1990, 1992

Na Rossa

- Donegal Intermediate Football Championship: 1989
- Donegal Junior Football Championship: 1982

=== Manager ===
Donegal

- Ulster Senior Football Championship: 2018 2019
- Ulster Under-21 Football Championship: 2017
- All-Ireland Minor Football Championship runner-up: 2014
- Ulster Minor Football Championship: 2014
- [Ulster Under-17] Jim McGuigan Cup: 201?
- [Ulster Under-16] Buncrana Cup: 2012

Na Rossa

- Donegal Intermediate Football Championship: 1989
- Donegal Junior Football Championship: 2023

Gaoth Dobhair

- Donegal Senior Football Championship: 2006

Erne Gaels

- Fermanagh Senior Football Championship: 2024, 2025

Sporting positions
Preceded by P. J. McGowan	Donegal Senior Football Manager; 1997–2000	Succeeded by Mickey Moran
Preceded by Rory Gallagher	Donegal Senior Football Manager; 2017–2022	Succeeded by Paddy Carr
Preceded by Maxi Curran	Donegal Under-21 Football Manager; 2015–2017	Succeeded by Gary McDaid
Preceded by Stephen Friel	Donegal Minor Football Manager; 2013–2015	Succeeded by Shaun Paul Barrett
