= Donegal Intermediate Football Championship =

Gaelic football competition in Ireland

- Irish: Craobh Peil Idirmheánach Dhún na nGall
- Founded: 1977
- Title holders: Naomh Columba (1st title)
- Most titles: Na Dúnaibh & Termon (4 titles)

The Donegal Intermediate Football Championship (abbreviated as Donegal IFC) is an annual football competition organised by Donegal GAA.

Naomh Pádraig Uisce Chaoin are the current holders, defeating Carndonagh 1-16 v 0-18 in the 2026 decider.

== History ==
The competition has been won by 29 clubs, 13 of which have won it more than once.

Declan Bonner was player-manager of the 1989 winning team. He won the Ulster Senior Football Championship with his county in 1990, followed by another in 1992 and the All-Ireland Senior Football Championship of 1992 as well.

A young Jim McGuinness first came to the attention of then Donegal manager Brian McEniff in the 1990 final.

The most successful team to have emerged from the Donegal IFC in the 21st-century is Glenswilly. They went on to claim several SFC honours for the first time in club history (2011, 2013, 2016). Neil Gallagher, the future National Football League-winning captain and All Star of the 2012 and 2014 All-Ireland Senior Football Championship, won the Donegal IFC in 2005.

The 2006 final required two replays before Cloich Cheann Fhaola defeated Gaeil Fhánada.

Initially a straight knock-out competition, a round-robin group stage was introduced in 2013.

With its 2023 title win, Na Dúnaibh became the first club to win the competition on four occasions, having previously done so in 1981, 1988 and 1993. They were joined by CLG An Tearmainn after their defeat of CLG Naomh Columba in 2024.

Men to have won this competition and to have played at senior level for their county include Paddy McConigley (2009), Michael Boyle (2012), Kevin Mulhern (2014), Jamie and Paul Brennan (2015), Frank McGlynn (2018), Stephen Griffin (2019) and Peter Boyle (2020).

Others to have played in this competition and played at senior level for their county include Caolan McColgan, Michael Lynch, Niall McCready and Brian Roper.

== Honours ==
The winning club receives the Cathal McLaughlin Memorial Cup. The winning club is promoted to the Donegal Senior Football Championship for the following season.

The Donegal IFC winner qualifies for the Ulster Intermediate Club Football Championship. It is the only team from County Donegal to qualify for this competition. The Donegal IFC winner may enter the Ulster Intermediate Club Football Championship at either the preliminary round or the quarter-final stage.

The Donegal IFC winner — by winning the Ulster Intermediate Club Football Championship — may qualify for the All-Ireland Intermediate Club Football Championship, at which it would enter at the semi-final stage, providing it hasn't been drawn to face the British champions in the quarter-finals. The last team from County Donegal to do this was St Michael's in 2004 who went on to reach the final, losing out to Ilen Rovers of Cork.

== Winners and finalists ==
=== Results by team ===
Results by team
#	Team	Wins	Years won	Last final lost
1	Na Dúnaibh	4	1981, 1988, 1993, 2023	1978
1	Termon	4	1991, 2000, 2012, 2024	—N/a
2	Réalt na Mara	3	1977, 2010, 2015	2009
2	Glenfin	3	1983, 2001, 2018	1997
2	Naomh Muire	3	1994, 1998, 2013	—N/a
2	Cloich Cheann Fhaola	3	2006, 2014, 2021	2019
2	Naomh Ultan	2	1984, 2002	1998
2	An Clochán Liath	2	1986, 2022	2021
2	Na Rossa	2	1989, 1999	2008
2	Milford	2	1992, 2017	2016
2	Buncrana	2	1995, 2004	2014
2	Gaeil Fhánada	2	2007, 2009	2006
2	St Naul's	2	2011, 2019	2017
3	Rosses Rovers	1	1978	—N/a
3	Na Cealla Beaga	1	1979	—N/a
3	Roger Casements (Note: Roger Casements were a Milford-based side which disbanded after losing to Convoy in the 1982 IFC semi-final — https://sites.google.com/a/gaa.ie/naomh-ultan-dunkineely-donegal/history.)	1	1980	—N/a
3	Urris	1	1982	—N/a
3	Gaoth Dobhair	1	1985	—N/a
3	Naomh Bríd	1	1987	—N/a
3	Naomh Conaill	1	1990	1986
3	Four Masters	1	1996	—N/a
3	Carndonagh	1	1997	2003,2026
3	St Michael's	1	2003	2000
3	Glenswilly	1	2005	—N/a
3	Seán MacCumhaill's	1	2008	—N/a
3	Burt	1	2016	—N/a
3	Aodh Ruadh	1	2020	2018
3	Naomh Columba	1	2025	2024
3	Naomh Pádraig Uisce Chaoin	1	2026	

=== Finals listed by year ===
Year	Winner	Score	Opponent	Score	Winning captain	Man of the match	Winning manager
1977	Réalt na Mara	2-11	Convoy	0-11			
1978	Rosses Rovers	0-9	Na Dúnaibh	0-7			
1979	Na Cealla Beaga	1-8	Glenfin	0-8			
1980	Roger Casements	3-5	Cloich Cheann Fhaola	1-10			
1981	Na Dúnaibh	0-13	Glenfin	0-8			
1982	Urris	1-5	Red Hughs	0-7			
1983	Glenfin	2-10	Na Rossa	2-8			
1984	Naomh Ultan	1-5	Cill Chartha	0-5			
1985	Gaoth Dobhair	2-8	St Naul's	0-5			
1986	An Clochán Liath	0-8	Naomh Conaill	0-6			
1987	Naomh Bríd	0-6	St Naul's	0-5			
1988	Na Dúnaibh	0-6	St Naul's	0-5			
1989	Na Rossa	3-8	Naomh Ultan	2-8			
1990	Naomh Conaill	2-12	Réalt na Mara	2-10			
1991	Termon	1-15	Réalt na Mara	1-7			
1992	Milford	1-12	Naomh Ultan	2-8			
1993	Na Dúnaibh	1-13	Na Rossa	0-9			
1994	Naomh Muire	0-8	St Naul's	0-3			
1995	Buncrana	1-8	St Naul's	1-5			
1996	Four Masters	2-15	Carndonagh	1-5			
1997	Carndonagh	1-12	Glenfin	1-11			
1998	Naomh Muire	1-10	Naomh Ultan	2-6			
1999	Na Rossa	1-13	Malin	1-11			
2000	Termon	0-16	St Michael's	0-4			
2001	Glenfin	1-13	Malin	0-7			
2002	Naomh Ultan	2-4	Buncrana	0-8			
2003	St Michael's	0-18	Carndonagh	0-5			
2004	Buncrana	1-7	St Naul's	0-4			
2005	Glenswilly	1-12	Cloich Cheann Fhaola	1-7			
2006	Cloich Cheann Fhaola	1-11	Gaeil Fhánada	0-8			
2007	Gaeil Fhánada	0-10	Réalt na Mara	1-6			
2008	Seán MacCumhaills	0-10	Na Rossa	0-7			
2009	Gaeil Fhánada	2-9	Réalt na Mara	1-7			
2010	Réalt na Mara	1-8	Cloich Cheann Fhaola	0-9			
2011	St Naul's	1-5	Naomh Columba	0-3			
2012	Termon	0-11	Aodh Ruadh	1-7			
2013	Naomh Muire	1-13	St Naul's	1-7	Paul "Yank" Boyle		Danny O'Donnell
2014	Cloich Cheann Fhaola	0-15	Buncrana	0-8			Joe McGarvey
2015	Réalt na Mara	4-17	Naomh Colmcille	0-4	Tommy Hourihan	Shane McGowan; Team of the Year	Brian Gavigan
2016	Burt	2-11	Milford	1-12	Martin Donaghey	Paul McHugh	Ronan McLaughlin
2017	Milford	2-11	St Naul's	0-12	Paddy Peoples	Gary Merritt	Danny O'Donnell
2018	Glenfin	1-10	Aodh Ruadh	0-7	Gerard Ward	Gerard Ward	Liam Breen
2019	St Naul's	1-10	Cloich Cheann Fhaola	0-10	Stephen Griffin	Kevin Mulhern	Barry Meehan
2020	Aodh Ruadh	2-14	Cloich Cheann Fhaola	1-12	Johnny Gethins & Nathan Boyle	Nathan Boyle	Barry Ward
2021	Cloich Cheann Fhaola	3-4 / 1-11	An Clochán Liath	0-13 / 0-5	Mark Harley	Jason McGee	Michael Lynch
2022	An Clochán Liath	1-8	Naomh Columba	0-4	Conor O'Donnell	Darren Curran	Dessie Gallagher
2023	Na Dúnaibh	1-11	Malin	0-9	Ben McNutt	Johnny McGroddy	Kevin 'Cookie' Gallagher
2024	Termon	0-14	Naomh Columba	0-8	Ricky Gallagher	Jamie Grant	Caolan 'Jaffa' McDaid
2025	Naomh Columba	3-14	Malin	2-9	Pauric Ward and Philip Doherty	Padraig Byrne	Brendan Doherty
2026	Naomh Pádraig Uisce Chaoin	1-16	Carndonagh	0-18	Darragh McIntyre	Kevin Lynch	Peter Murphy
