= CLG Chloich Cheann Fhaola =

Donegal-based Gaelic games club

Cloughaneely GAA
- CLG Chloich Cheann Fhaola
- County: Donegal
- Colours: Blue and White
- Grounds: Páirc Chloich Cheann Fhaola
- Coordinates: 55°08′24″N 8°5′57″W

Playing kits
Standard colours

CLG Chloich Cheann Fhaola is a Gaelic football and handball club for the parish of Cloughaneely, County Donegal, Ireland. The club is based in Falcarragh. It also covers the area to the village of Gortahork, as well as Meenlaragh and Magheroarty. The club fields both men's and ladies' teams from underage as far as senior level.

Its honorary president, Fr Seán Ó Gallchóir, is a statistician who compiled The Book of Donegal GAA Facts. John Horan gave him a GAA President's Award in 2021.

== History ==
As of 2018, the club was competing in the Donegal League Division 1, and in the Senior Football Championship (SFC).

Manager Joe McGarvey led the club to the 2014 Donegal IFC but resigned shortly afterwards, to be replaced by backroom team member John Paul Gallagher.

Former captain, John Harley, was killed in a traffic collision in 2019. Another player, Daniel Scott, was killed in the same collision. Captained by Harley's brother Mark, the club reached the final of the IFC in 2019. The club won the IFC in 2021.

Cloich Cheann Fhaola's home defeat of Milford in the 2023 Donegal Senior Football Championship marked the first time in twelve years that the club had won a senior championship game. Two weeks after that the club defeated Four Masters as well.

== Rivalries ==
The club has a rivalry with St Michael's.

== Notable players ==
- Jason McGee — 2019 Ulster SFC winner and past Australian rules football trialist
- Charlie McGeever
- Kevin Mulhern — 2010 Ulster Under-21 FC winner and 2010 All-Ireland Under-21 FC finalist

== Managers ==
Years	Manager
1952–20??	—
?–c. 2014	Joe McGarvey
2015–c. 2017	John Paul Gallagher
c. 2017–2022	Michael Lynch
2022–	Denis Doohan

== Honours ==
- Donegal Intermediate Football Championship (3): 2006, 2014, 2021
- Donegal Junior Football Championship (3): 1938, 1939, 1959
- Comórtas Peile na Gaeltachta Dhún na nGall - Sinsír (?): …1998, 2017
