= CLG Naomh Muire =

Donegal-based Gaelic games club

- Founded: 1980
- County: Donegal
- Colours: Green and White
- Grounds: The Banks (Na Méilte)
- Coordinates: 55°01′50″N 8°22′17″W

Playing kits
Standard colours

CLG Naomh Muire is a Gaelic football only GAA club based in Mullaghderg, County Donegal, Ireland, and serves the lower Rosses area. The club fields both men's and ladies' teams at underage to senior level.

As of 2022, the club competes in the Donegal Intermediate Championship.

== History ==
The club was formed in 1980.

Tony Doherty (Antóin Ó Dochartaigh) of Rann na Feirste was a co-founder. Ó Dochartaigh also acted as field liner, kit man, referee, linesman and trainer at various stages and also served as secretary and treasurer of the club. He led the vote to acquire floodlights for the club's facilities.

The club have won the All-Ireland Comórtas Peile na Gaeltachta three times, in 2007, 2011 and 2024.

The club won the 2013 Donegal Intermediate Football Championship, defeating St Naul's in the final.

Jack O'Brien played for Donegal in the 2016 National Football League semi-final against Dublin at Croke Park.

Former Donegal selector Gary Boyle is from the club.

The club has been involved in a long-running boundary dispute over players since 1980.

== Managers ==
Years	Manager
1980–2009	—
2009–2013	Danny O'Donnell
2013–2022	—
2022–	Danny O'Donnell

== Honours ==
- All-Ireland Junior Gaeltacht Championship (3): 2007, 2011, 2024
- Donegal Intermediate Football Championship (3): 1994, 1998, 2013
- Donegal Junior Football Championship (2): 1991, 2007
