= Glenfin GAA =

Donegal-based Gaelic games club

Glenfin
- CLG Ghleann Fhinne
- Founded: 1975
- County: Donegal
- Colours: White and red
- Grounds: Páirc Taobhoige

Playing kits
Standard colours

CLG Ghleann Fhinne (Glenfin) is a Gaelic games club in the Parish of Glenfin, County Donegal, Ireland. The club's home ground is Páirc Taobhoige. Their Senior Ladies team have won the Donegal Senior Ladies championships in 2011, 2017, 2018, 2020, and 2025. Their senior men's gaelic football team were relegated to division two of the Donegal Senior Championship in September 2026.

== History ==
Manager Liam Breen led the club to the 2018 Donegal IFC.

== Notable players ==
- Stephen McDermott — All-Ireland SFC semi-finalist: 2003
- Frank McGlynn — 2012 All-Ireland SFC winner; five times Ulster SFC winner; a Donegal All Star
- Yvonne Bonner- Senior Ladies GAA player and Greater Western Australia Australian Rules player
- Karen Guthrie- Former Donegal Senior Ladies player

== Managers ==
Years	Manager
1975–2000s	—N/a
2000s	Frank Ward (player–manager)
?–c. 2018	Liam Breen
2019–2021	Mark McGinty
2021–202?	David Carroll and Gareth Martin
202?–2025	Frank Ward
2024–	Frank McGlynn

== Honours ==
Football

- Ulster Intermediate Club Football Championship: 2001
- Donegal Intermediate Football Championship: 1983, 2001, 2018
- Donegal Under-21 A Football Championship: 2002
- Donegal Under-21 B Football Championship: 2015

=== Ladies' football ===
- Ulster Ladies Senior Club Football Championship runner-up: 2011, 2018
- Donegal Senior Ladies Football Championship: 2011, 2017, 2018, 2020, 2025
