= Donegal county football team =

Gaelic football team

Donegal
- Sport: Football
- Irish: Dún na nGall
- Nickname(s): The Tír Chonaill men
- County board: Donegal GAA
- Manager: Jim McGuinness
- Captain: Patrick McBrearty
- Most appearances: Neil McGee (195)
- Top scorer: Michael Murphy (500+)
- Home venue(s): MacCumhaill Park, Ballybofey

Recent competitive record
- Current All-Ireland status: Ulster W in 2025
- Last championship title: 2012
- Current NFL Division: 1 (W in 2026)
- Last league title: 2026
First colours	Second colours

The Donegal county football team represents Donegal in men's Gaelic football and is governed by Donegal GAA, the county board of the Gaelic Athletic Association. The team competes in the three major annual inter-county competitions; the All-Ireland Senior Football Championship, the Ulster Senior Football Championship and the National Football League.

Donegal's home ground is MacCumhaill Park, Ballybofey. The team's manager is Jim McGuinness.

Donegal was the third Ulster county to win an All-Ireland Senior Football Championship (SFC), following Cavan and Down. The team last won the Ulster Senior Championship in 2025, the All-Ireland Senior Championship in 2012 and the National League in 2026.

Currently regarded as one of the best teams in the sport, Karl Lacey won the 2012 All Stars Footballer of the Year, Michael Murphy won the 2009 All Stars Young Footballer of the Year and Ryan McHugh won the 2014 All Stars Young Footballer of the Year, while numerous other players have been selected on All Star teams. Donegal players comprised most of the 2012 All Stars Team of the Year, as well as all three nominations for Footballer of the Year, ultimately won by Lacey. In addition, having been invited to assist the Celtic association football club in Scotland, Donegal manager Jim McGuinness became the first Gaelic football inter-county manager to have been offered a role at a professional sports team abroad. McGuinness's services have also been sought by Premier League clubs. In terms of style, "the system" deployed by McGuinness's team was likened to that of the Spanish association football team FC Barcelona.

Donegal is one of only five counties to have defeated Kerry in their first Championship meeting — the others being Down (1960), Derry (1958), Dublin (1893) and Cork (1889). Distances to games involving provincial opponents have been a problem.

== Panel ==
Team as per Donegal vs Meath in the 2025 All-Ireland Senior Football Championship Semi-Final, 13th July 2025

No.	Player	Position	Club
1	Shaun Patton	Goalkeeper	St Eunan's
2	Finnbarr Roarty	Right corner-back	Naomh Conaill
3	Brendan McCole	Full back	St Naul's
4	Peadar Mogan	Left corner-back	St Naul's
5	Ryan McHugh	Right half-back	Chill Chartha
6	Eoghán Bán Gallagher	Centre back	Na Cealla Beaga
7	Caolan McColgan	Left half-back	Naomh Pádraig
8	Hugh McFadden	Midfield	Na Cealla Beaga
9	Michael Langan	Midfield	St Michael's
10	Shane O'Donnell	Right half-forward	St Eunan's
11	Ciarán Thompson	Centre forward	Naomh Conaill
12	Ciarán Moore	Left half-forward	St Eunan's
13	Conor O'Donnell	Right corner-forward	Carndonagh
14	Michael Murphy	Full forward	Glenswilly
15	Oisín Gallen	Left corner-forward	Seán Mac Cumhaills

No.	Player	Position	Club
16	Gavin Mulreany	Goalkeeper	St Naul's
17	Stephen McMenamin	Centre-back	Red Hughs
18	Ódhran McFadden Ferry	Wing-back	Ghaoth Dobhair
19	Eoin McHugh	Wing-back	Chill Chartha
20	Caolan McGonagle	Centre-back	Buncrana
21	Odhrán Doherty	Wing-forward	Naomh Conaill
22	Patrick McBrearty (c)	Corner-forward	Chill Chartha
23	Jamie Brennan	Corner-forward	Réalt na Mara
24	Niall O'Donnell	Corner-forward	St Eunan's
25	Daire Ó Baoill	Wing-forward	Ghaoth Dobhair
26	Jason McGee	Midfield	Chloich Cheann Fhaola

^{INJ} Player has had an injury which has affected recent involvement with the county team.
^{RET} Player has since retired from the county team.
^{WD} Player has since withdrawn from the county team due to a non-injury issue.

== Management team ==
Confirmed in August 2023, some additions and subtractions noted::

- Manager: Jim McGuinness
- Backroom team:
  - Colm McFadden
  - Neil McGee
  - Luke Barrett (until August 2025)
  - Antoin McFadden Lead Athletic Performance 2023 to 2025
- Goalkeeping coach: James Gallagher (announced November 2023)

== Captains ==
List of Donegal Gaelic Football team captains since 1992

Year(s)	Captain
1992	Anthony Molloy
1998	John Joseph “John Joe”
2008	Kevin Cassidy
2009	Rory Kavanagh
2010	Kevin Cassidy
2011 - 2022	Michael Murphy
2023–present	Paddy McBrearty

== History ==
=== Early years ===
Following the first Donegal County Board's formation in 1905, the county team's first football game was against Derry on 17 March 1906.

Donegal lost the 1933 "Home final" of the 1933 All-Ireland Junior Football Championship to Mayo (2–15 to 2–2), and the team then made its next appearance at Croke Park on Sunday 6 April 1952. The occasion was a National Football League semi-final and the opponent that day was Cork.

=== 1960s ===
The 1960s saw Donegal emerge as a well-known team, with many victories in that decade. However, Down was also a force on the national stage, becoming the first team from the North to win All-Ireland SFC titles in 1960, 1961 and 1968. Donegal's first appearance in an Ulster Senior Football Championship final was not until 1963, followed by a second appearance in 1966; Down won in both appearances. That was a vintage year for Donegal; in 1963, Declan O'Carroll started in five Ulster finals in what went down as a "great year" for Donegal.

=== McEniff years 1970s–1980s: Ulster and Under-21 success ===
The county came to the fore of Ulster football in the 1970s, winning its first Ulster SFC title in 1972. McEniff was player-manager of the 1972 team. The win coincided with the county's first All Star—in the form of McEniff himself—in the second year of the award's existence. Reigning All-Ireland SFC champion Offaly defeated the Ulster SFC champion in the 1972 All-Ireland SFC semi-final, on the way to a second consecutive All-Ireland SFC title.

A second provincial title followed for Donegal in 1974. McEniff was again player-manager. Galway — the All-Ireland SFC finalist from 1971 and 1973 — defeated Donegal in the 1974 All-Ireland SFC semi-final.

In 1979, Donegal reached the Ulster SFC final again, under the guidance of Sean O'Donnell, but lost to Monaghan.

In October 1982, Tom Conaghan managed Donegal to the 1982 All-Ireland Under-21 Football Championship title.

McEniff returned as senior manager, and Donegal won a third provincial title in 1983, with ten members of the 1982 under-21 team included in the panel. Seamus Bonner became the first player from the county to win the competition as a player on three occasions, having earlier won in 1972 and 1974. Again though, Donegal lost to Galway in the 1983 All-Ireland SFC semi-final, ahead of what would become a notorious 1983 All-Ireland Senior Football Championship final, known as the "Game of Shame".

Tom Conaghan took over as senior manager from McEniff after McEniff departed again in the mid-1980s. Over the course of his time as senior manager during the 1980s, Conaghan fell out with players such as Declan Bonner, Manus Boyle, Matt Gallagher, Barry McGowan and Sylvester Maguire. Conaghan's spell as county manager ended with a heavy defeat to Tyrone.

Donegal won the 1987 All-Ireland Under-21 Football Championship title, a success which provided the basis for future prosperity in the county. The under-21 team defeated Kerry in the final. P. J. McGowan managed the 1987 under-21 team.

=== 1990s: Sam Maguire Cup ===
McEniff returned as senior manager for a fourth time in September 1989. He led the county to another Ulster SFC title in 1990, restoring players who had gone by the wayside, such as Bonner, Boyle, Gallagher, McGowan and Maguire. Donegal lost to eventual All-Ireland SFC finalist Meath in the 1990 All-Ireland SFC semi-final.

However, Donegal would win the Ulster SFC title again in 1992. As a result of this victory a 1992 All-Ireland SFC semi-final against Mayo beckoned. Donegal overcame the men from Mayo to set up a 1992 All-Ireland Senior Football Championship final meeting with raging-hot favourites Dublin. Donegal's greatest footballing accomplishment yet was realised on 20 September 1992 when the senior team defeated the highly fancied Dublin, by a scoreline of 0–18 to 0–14, to take the Sam Maguire Cup for the first time. Brian McEniff, serving in his second spell as Donegal manager, pulled the strings. Man of the Match Manus Boyle scored 0–9 (four from play), while Gary Walsh pulled off a great save from Vinny Murphy at the end. This was the zenith of this great Donegal team which contested five successive Ulster SFC finals between 1989 and 1993. The Donegal team of this era also contested the final of the National Football League three times in a four-year period (1993 v. Dublin, 1995 v. Derry, 1996 v. Derry) without success. McEniff soon stood down as manager.

Martin McHugh wanted to take charge of Donegal after McEniff left the job. However, he was prevented from doing so by the Donegal County Board in a snub that would be echoed in Jim McGuinness's numerous later attempts to get the same job—McGuinness was, however, ultimately successful; after being rejected by the Donegal County Board on several occasions he would go on to be Donegal's most successful manager since McEniff. McHugh was hurt by his rejection, saying: "I thought there was another All-Ireland in Donegal and that's why I went for that job. I thought there was another All-Ireland there, and there was a lot of good players coming too. But anyway, that's the way it worked out".

It was 1987 All-Ireland Under-21 Football Championship-winning manager P. J. McGowan took over from McEniff in 1994. He lasted till 1997.

=== Declan Bonner (first term): 1997–2000 ===
Declan Bonner managed the team between 1997 and 2000. He began on his 32nd birthday, within four weeks of retirement. He was informed of the decision to appoint him at 9.29 pm on 11 August 1997, after Anthony Molloy, past manager Conaghan and Pauric McShea all withdrew. Charlie Mulgrew and Matt Gallagher were part of Bonner's management team. Bonner led Donegal to the 1997–98 National Football League semi-final against eventual title winners Offaly and the 1998 Ulster SFC final against Derry — a last-minute Joe Brolly goal, accompanied by a few kisses to the crowd, put paid to that one.

=== John Joe and the Derrymen: 2000–2010 ===
Mickey Moran was appointed manager on a three-year term in August 2000, succeeding Declan Bonner. Moran's first game in charge was a league victory at home to Offaly, a win achieved while fielding four debutants (Stephen Cassidy, Michael Doherty, Barry Monaghan and ... one other?). During his tenure selector Michael Houston quit after a public falling out with Moran. Moran's first year in charge of Donegal was a disappointing one, but 2002 was more successful, leading Donegal to the Ulster final (which the team lost to Armagh), and then to the 2002 All-Ireland SFC quarter-final against Dublin. However, in September 2002, he informed the county board he would not be staying for the third year of the term. All-Ireland SFC winning manager Brian McEniff took the reins for the 2003 season. His first game back in charge, an away league fixture to Galway in Tuam in February 2003, ended in defeat. However, McEniff guided Donegal to the 2003 All-Ireland SFC semi-final, the first time the team had played at this stage of the competition since 1992. The following year, Donegal reached another Ulster SFC final, again losing out to Armagh. McEniff stepped down after the 2005 season, to end his fourth and final tenure with his county.

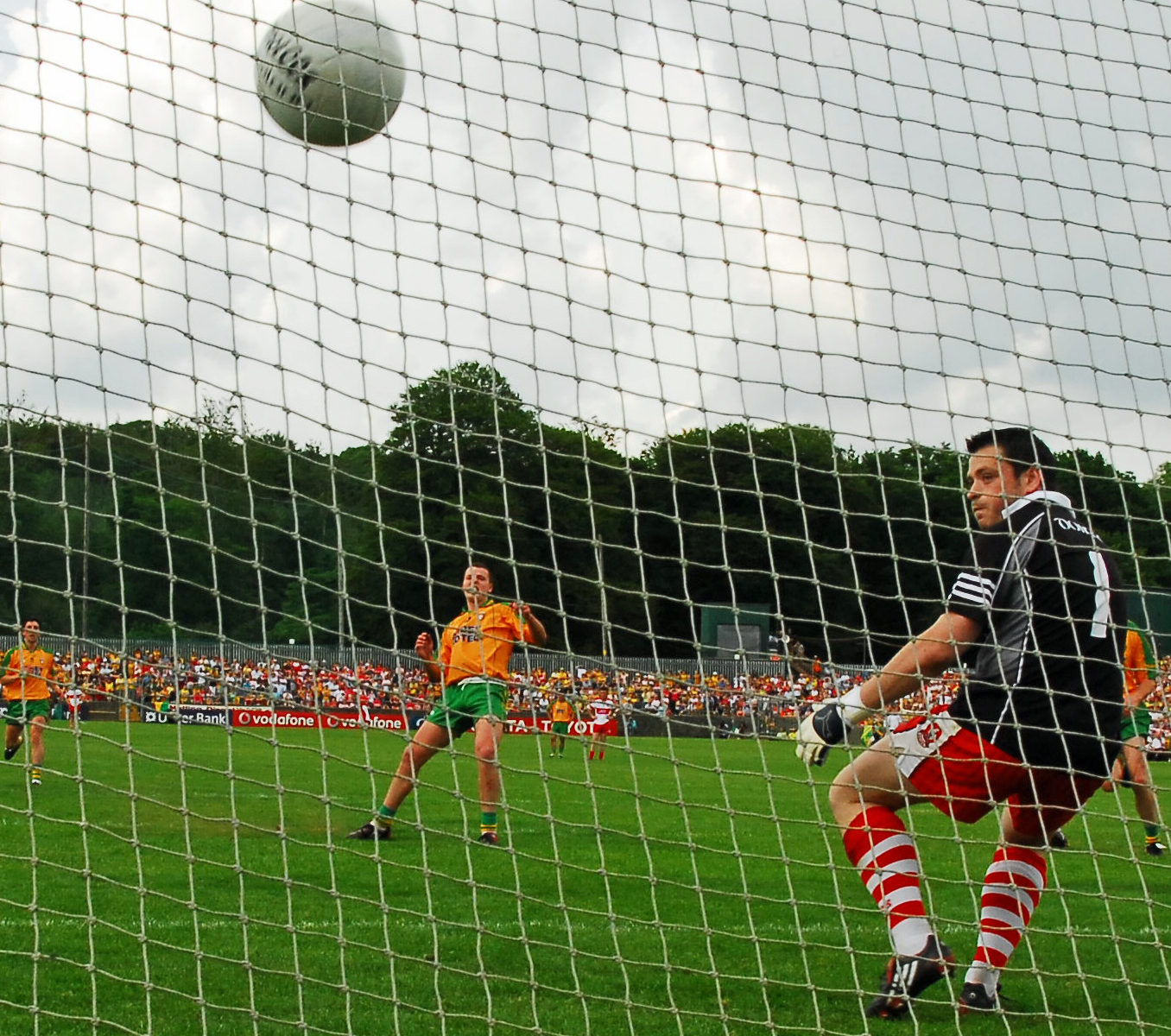
Michael Murphy scores a penalty in the 2008 Ulster Senior Football Championship

Brian McIver was appointed manager in 2006. His tenure saw a slight improvement in the fortunes of the team, as he led Donegal into Division 1 of the National Football League. However, the county had been without a trophy for 15 years. The team had contested the 1993 and 1998 Ulster SFC finals, but lost to Derry on both occasions. Defeat to Armagh in the same contest in 2002, 2004 and 2006 meant another decade passed without a championship trophy. Donegal contested the 2006 Division 2 final, but lost to Louth. The famine came to an abrupt end in 2007 when the senior football team won the National Football League title for the first time in the county's history. Donegal overcame Mayo at Croke Park on Sunday 22 April 2007, winning by a scoreline of 0–13 to 0–10. En route to the final, Donegal defeated Cork, Mayo, Tyrone, Dublin, Kerry, Fermanagh and Kildare, while drawing with Limerick.

McIver stood down as manager after the 2007 championship; however, he was reinstated before the beginning of the 2008 championship. In 2008, at a county board meeting, a motion of no confidence was tabled by the St Eunan's and Gaoth Dobhair clubs; as a result McIver felt compelled to resign. Declan Bonner and Charlie Mulgrew were appointed "Joint Managers" when John Joe Doherty of the Naomh Columba club was said to have rejected the opportunity to become manager. However, Doherty entered negotiations before Bonner and Mulgrew were rubber stamped. He was later offered the job for a second time, which he accepted. Bonner and Mulgrew had contested that the procedure which led to the installing of John Joe Doherty as football manager in the county was flawed. The duo's case was heard November 2008, but had taken 13 days of deliberation for the DRA to reach a verdict. John Joe Doherty was appointed manager at the November county board meeting. Bonner, Mulgrew and Doherty had been joined by Michael Houston, Francie Martin and Jim McGuinness on the shortlist to become manager.

=== McGuinness one: 2010–2014 ===
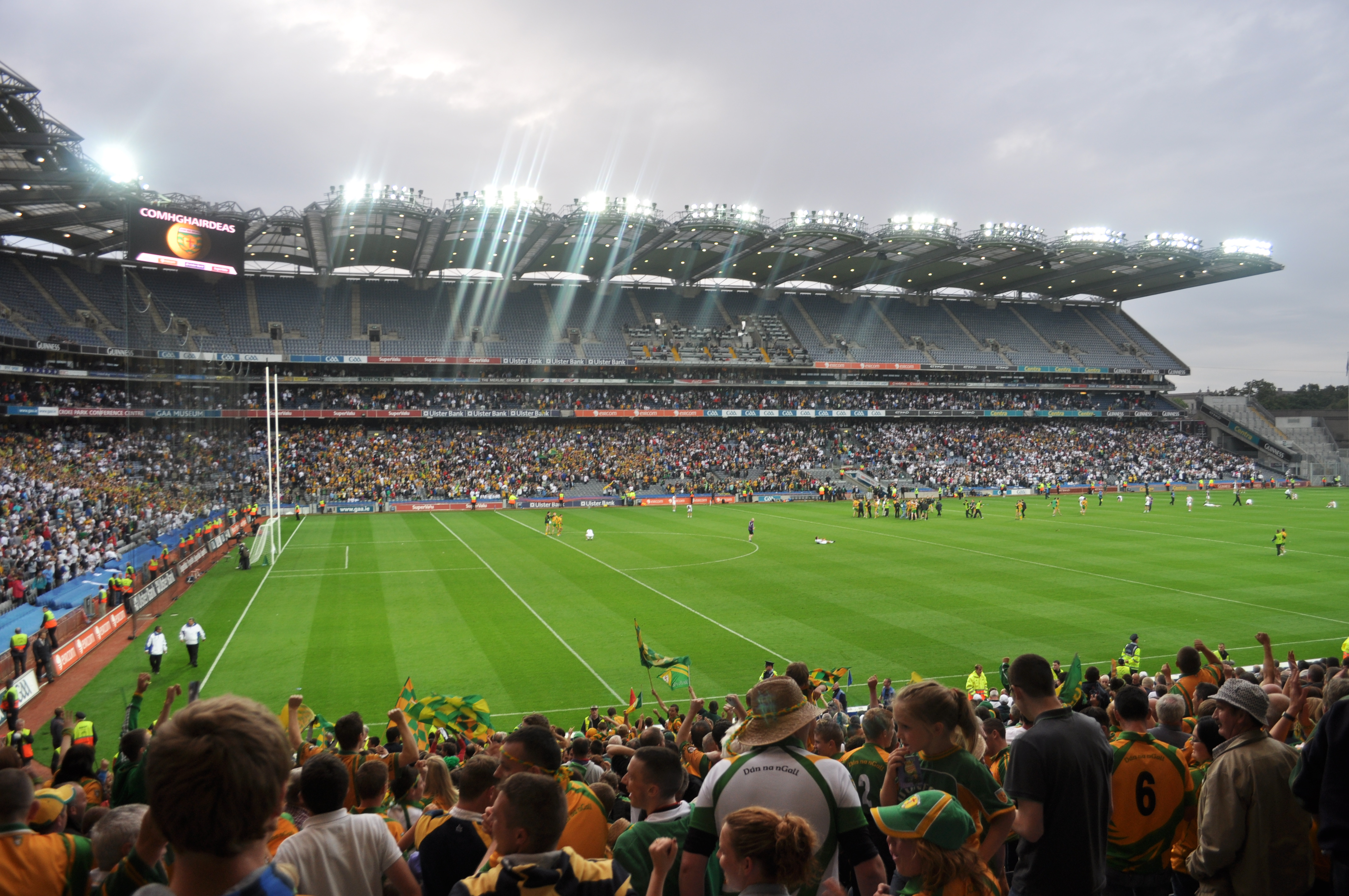
Donegal defeated Kildare in the 2011 All-Ireland Senior Football Championship in Jim McGuinness's first season in charge.

In July 2010, Jim McGuinness, the then under-21 manager, was appointed as county senior manager, succeeding John Joe Doherty. McGuinness had guided Donegal's under-21 team to the 2010 All-Ireland Under 21 Football Championship final. He was appointed to the senior management on a four-year term, with a review after two years. His first year in charge brought Donegal the National Football League Division 2 title, promotion to Division 1, the county's first championship win in four years, the county's first provincial title in 19 years, and made Donegal the third team in the history of the GAA to win a provincial title from the preliminary round. His second season brought a second consecutive provincial title, also achieved from the preliminary round, as well as a defeat of Kerry at Croke Park and a win over Cork on 26 August to secure a place in the 2012 All Ireland Football Final.

In 2010, after a disappointing championship, in which Donegal lost at home to Down after extra-time, and to Armagh in Crossmaglen by nine points in the first round of the All-Ireland SFC qualifiers, John Joe Doherty resigned from his post as senior football manager. The only candidate to replace him was Jim McGuinness. Upon his appointment on 26 July 2010, McGuinness brought Kevin Cassidy and Michael Hegarty out of retirement, introduced many players from the under-21 side he had taken to the 2010 All-Ireland Under 21 Football Championship final, and introduced structure and discipline, a feature that many observers claimed was lacking in many talented Donegal teams between 1993 and 2011.

McGuinness's first major success as senior manager was to win the National Football League Division 2, when Donegal defeated Laois by a scoreline of 2–11 to 0–16 at Croke Park. Donegal went unbeaten through the league season, except for the last league match proper, a loss to Laois. Before the Division 2 Final, Donegal had topped the Division 2 league, and the team was guaranteed promotion, having achieved four wins, two draws, and one loss.

After this victory, expectations for the county were high, with many pundits predicting that Donegal would win the Ulster SFC title. Donegal faced Antrim in the 2011 Ulster SFC preliminary round, winning that game by a scoreline of 1–10 to 0–7. This was the team's first championship win since 2007. This set up an away match against Cavan, from which Donegal once again emerged victorious, by a scoreline of 2–14 to 1–8. A more ominous test against Tyrone would follow this Cavan victory. The new defensive system developed by Jim McGuinness would be put to the test against a Tyrone team which had perfected the blanket defense tactic on the way to three All-Ireland SFC titles during the 2000s. Donegal fought their way to a 2–6 to a 0–9 win.

This set up an Ulster SFC final meeting against a heavily fancied Derry, which one week prior to Donegal's victory over Tyrone, put 3–14 past an Armagh team which had just overcome Down, the 2010 All-Ireland SFC runner-up.

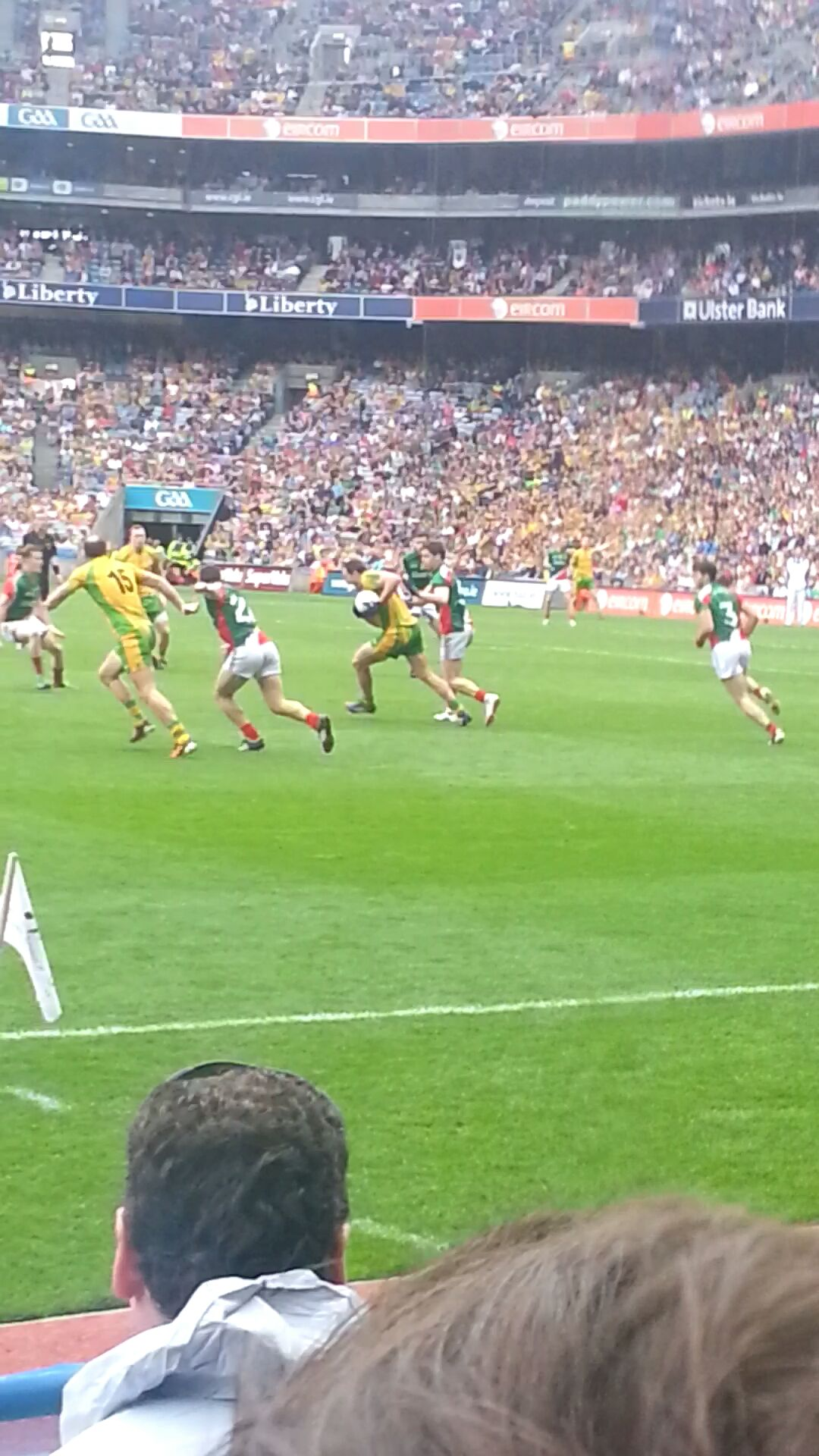
Donegal v Mayo in the 2012 All-Ireland Senior Football Championship final, won by Donegal

On 17 July 2011, in Clones, Donegal played in a first Ulster SFC final for five years, and a sixth Ulster SFC final since 1992. In front of a crowd of 28,364 Donegal beat Derry by 1–11 to 0–08 points. This was only the third time in the history of the Ulster SFC that a team which played in the preliminary round would win the final, following in the footsteps of Armagh in 2005 and Cavan 66 years earlier. On 30 July 2011, Donegal travelled to Croke Park to play Kildare in the 2011 All-Ireland SFC quarter-final. In an absorbing contest, a Kevin Cassidy point deep into extra-time sealed Donegal's progression to a first All-Ireland SFC semi-final since 2003. The semi-final against Dublin, which Dublin eventually won 0–8 to 0–6, was to be regarded as one of the lowest scoring but most absorbing championship duels in living memory.

Then came the 2012 Ulster SFC. On 22 July 2012, Donegal retained the Ulster SFC title for the first time in history with a 2–18 to 0–13 victory over Down. On 5 August 2012, Donegal defeated Kerry in the 2012 All-Ireland SFC quarter-final. The first ever championship meeting between the sides at senior level, it was only the second time in history that Kerry had been defeated at the quarter-final stage. Ahead of the next match against Cork, few outside the county gave Donegal a chance, and Cork went into the game as heavy favourite to win the title itself (even though this was only the semi-final). Donegal endeavoured to swat aside a lacklustre Cork side with ease, and progressed to a first title decider since 1992. Tyrone's Mickey Harte, attempting to analyse the game for the BBC, expressed his shock: "To be honest, I could not see that coming. Donegal annihilated Cork, there is no other word for it." Martin McHugh, a member of the successful 1992 side, said it was the best ever performance by any Donegal team, including his own. Donegal then emerged victorious from the 2012 All-Ireland Senior Football Championship final on 23 September 2012, to take the Sam Maguire Cup for a second time, with early goals from Michael Murphy and Colm McFadden ensuring that Mayo were never really in the contest. Donegal defeated Mayo, on a scoreline of 2–11 to 0–13. Man of the Match was awarded to Michael Murphy, who scored 1–4.

The 2013 season brought great expectation, with Donegal beginning it as the reigning All-Ireland SFC title holder. However, the team suffered relegation from Division 1 of the National Football League early in the year. In the 2013 Ulster SFC, Donegal dispatched Tyrone and Down to set up a provincial decider with Monaghan. The Monaghan team was unfancied coming into the game, with most of the pressure on the shoulders of the Tír Conaill men. Despite this, Monaghan defied the odds and emerged as winner by a scoreline of 0–13 to 0–7. After defeating Laois in a 2013 All-Ireland SFC fourth round qualifier, Donegal faced a Mayo team looking for revenge in the All-Ireland SFC quarter-final. They got that revenge, and got it hard, with a 4–17 to 1–10 drubbing that ended Donegal's bid to retain the Sam Maguire.

2014 saw a resurgent Donegal claim promotion from Division 2 of the National League, alongside Monaghan. Donegal overcame Derry in a tense 2014 Ulster SFC quarter-final and Antrim in the Ulster SFC semi-final, to set up another Ulster SFC final clash with Monaghan. This time Donegal came out on top, by three points, to reclaim the Ulster SFC title. A meeting with Armagh beckoned in the 2014 All-Ireland SFC quarter-final. An Odhrán Mac Niallais goal proved crucial, in a 1–12 to 1–11 win. This set up a daunting semi-final clash with 2013 All-Ireland SFC winner Dublin. At the time, this Dublin team was seen by many as unstoppable, and was heavy favourites for the clash with Donegal. Bookmakers had Donegal as low as 7/1 to win the game. However, after surviving a first half onslaught, a Ryan McHugh goal gave Donegal the lead at half-time. In the second half, Donegal swept Dublin aside, running out six-point winners, with McHugh and Colm McFadden to the fore. Kerry provided the final opposition, and, despite Kerry's traditional dominance, Donegal went into the game as favourite after that semi-final defeat of Dublin. Kerry upset the form books though, to claim a 2–9 to 0–12 win, and a 37th All-Ireland SFC title. Jim McGuinness stepped down in the aftermath of the game, having led his county to three Ulster SFC titles and an All-Ireland SFC title in his four years at the helm.

McGuinness won 83.33 per cent of his SFC matches during his first spell as Donegal manager (20 wins from 24 games); this included defeats, over a four-year period, of Armagh, Cavan, Cork, Derry, Dublin, Down, Kildare, Kerry, Mayo, Monaghan and Tyrone.

=== Between McGuinness: 2014–2023 ===
McGuinness's former assistant Rory Gallagher took over for the 2015 campaign, and the year began brightly with Donegal reaching the National League semi-final, losing out to Cork. Starting in the preliminary round of the 2015 Ulster SFC, Donegal defeated Tyrone, Armagh and Derry to set up a third successive Ulster SFC final, with now bitter rivals Monaghan. After winning tough games against Tyrone and Derry, Donegal would have been seen as the slight favourite going into the game. However, Monaghan prevailed by a single point, to consign Donegal to the 2015 All-Ireland SFC qualifiers. Galway awaited Donegal there; Donegal put in an improved performance and won by a scoreline of 3–12 to 0–11. Donegal went in as the underdog to an All-Ireland SFC quarter-final against Mayo. So it proved, as Mayo won by a comfortable seven-point margin, to end Donegal's hopes for another year.

The 2016 season began with Donegal looking to reclaim the Ulster SFC title and make a serious assault on the All-Ireland SFC. The team again reached the semi-final of the National League, this time being defeated by Dublin. The team's 2016 Ulster SFC began with a tricky encounter against Fermanagh at MacCumhaill Park, which Donegal eventually won by four points after going down to 14 men. The team faced familiar foe Monaghan in the Ulster SFC semi-final. After two intense games of football, Donegal won out to advance to a sixth successive Ulster SFC final, a feat only matched by the great Down side of the 1960s. Donegal would be up against Mickey Harte's Tyrone, a team appearing in its first final since 2010. Two injury time points handed Tyrone a first provincial title since 2010, and again Donegal headed for the 2016 All-Ireland SFC qualifiers. However, the team continued its recent good form in the qualifiers with a three-point victory over Cork, with Patrick McBrearty achieving an individual haul of 0–11. Leinster and All-Ireland SFC title holder Dublin awaited Donegal in the 2016 All-Ireland SFC quarter-final. Dublin avenged the 2014 semi-final defeat, winning a close contest by a scoreline of 1–15 to 1–10. They required a late Paul Mannion goal to kill off the game and, with it, Donegal's championship aspirations for 2016.

A 2017 Ulster SFC semi-final capitulation to Tyrone and 2017 All-Ireland SFC exit to Galway at Markievicz Park and Gallagher was gone.

Five contenders for the senior manager emerged: minor manager Shaun Paul Barrett, Declan Bonner, Cathal Corey, Gary McDaid and Séamus McEnaney. Bonner was announced as manager on 22 September 2017, taking charge for a second time.

Donegal won the 2018 Ulster SFC title. Senior players Jason McGee and Niall O'Donnell were not part of this one, as they decided to drop down to play with the under-20 team instead, between league and championship.

Donegal won the 2019 Ulster SFC title.

Bonner was reappointed for another two-year term as manager at the end of August 2021, when no other candidates emerged to succeed him.

He left the role in mid-2022. Then long-time captain Michael Murphy announced his retirement from inter-county football on 16 November 2022. Murphy's retirement, at the age of only 33, was unexpected. He released a statement via the county board. It was all going very, very wrong for Donegal.

=== McGuinness: The Second Coming ===
Donegal went out of the 2023 All Ireland race in a preliminary quarter final defeat to Tyrone that June, an unequivocal deterioration in standards overseen by Aidan O'Rourke, who was assisted by Paddy Bradley. O'Rourke was not cut out for the job at hand and was "clearly shaken" by the experience, according to the Irish Independent. Captain McBrearty, by now the longest serving player since Murphy's retirement, took the lead. He had had enough. He managed to locate the whereabouts of McGuinness's house deep in northern Donegal, a long way from Kilcar on the southwest coast - the pair "hadn't seen each other in a long time", McBrearty admitted. McBrearty led a group of players on a march to get into the McGuinness house. They "doorstepped" McGuinness, attempting to get him off guard and to get him to return as manager of the team. The players did not know what to expect. Not even McBrearty, the one who knew him most of all, was sure. By McGuinness's account a total of five players "arrived" after that Tyrone defeat. They sat about and chatted for a bit. McBrearty, speaking later, reported that McGuinness "never said no basically... Obviously if he said no, that would have been fine. It wasn't just one conversation, there was a few conversations obviously". Within "a few days", feelers were put out to the other players as McGuinness tried to suss out whether he would be welcome as their manager or if they would be interested in taking instructions from someone like him.

In August 2023, it began to be widely reported that Jim McGuinness would be returning as Donegal manager. On 20 August, Donegal GAA brought forward its monthly county board meeting to the following evening, where the only thng on the agenda was about appointing the new manager. Finally, on the evening of Monday the 21st of August, the return of McGuinness was confirmed in sensational fashion at that meeting, year one of three (with an option of a fourth) beginning pronto. It was big news the length and breadth of the sport throughout the island, with James Horan's return to the Mayo fold that same evening having to settle for second place as Horan slipped in quietly amid all the fuss over McGuinness. So it was back to the hard road again for McGuinness, very much like in 2010 when he had first took over. For the 2024 season, McGuinness led Donegal to the National Football League Division 2 title (and, with that, promotion to Division 1), the Ulster SFC title and the All-Ireland SFC semi-final, an exact replica of his first year (even with the exact same two-point defeat at the All-Ireland SFC semi-final stage). He did this without his All-Ireland SFC-winning captain Michael Murphy, who had, of course, retired from inter-county football. 2024 also notably saw Mickey Harte manage Derry to a heavy home defeat against Donegal in his only Ulster championship game as Derry manager. Donegal were able to carve out numerous goal opportunities due to Derry's tactics, but only managed to score four of them. The Irish Times described the game as a "classic". The newspaper also named Donegal's first goal, scored with a lob into an empty net as Derry goalkeeper Odhrán Lynch ran back up the pitch after vacating his goal, as its "Moment of the Year". Harte left at the end of the season.

Michael Murphy returned from his self-imposed exile with the 2025 season about to get underway. For this one, McGuinness set about making a carbon copy of his second season, which would require him to retain the Ulster title and add the All-Ireland to it. He would end up dealing with Kerry and their manager Jack O’Connor in both (2012 All-Ireland Quarter-final and 2025 Final). In the early part of the year McGuinness realised his plan was in jeopardy: Donegal were running away with the 2025 NFL Division 1 title, a mistake which he had been so careful to avoid in 2012. So, McGuinness supposedly changed tack to ensure Donegal did not finish in the top two of the NFL and have an extra game in an already quite compact season (if it had been 2012 there would have been two extra games as there was a semi-final that year). Many people (especially in the other three provinces) did not fully appreciate the danger involved in Donegal having to play the league final. But Donegal had an Ulster preliminary round date with Derry booked, so had a long season ahead if McGuinness's plan was to come to fruition. Even with the change of plan, Donegal had a narrow escape. At MacHale Park in the final game, Mayo player Eoin O'Donoghue fouled Aaron Doherty and conceded a penalty. Mayo had only a two-point lead. If Donegal scored it, they were in danger of making the league final. After some uncertainty among the players over what to do, up stepped Daire Ó Baoill with the clock showing 67 minutes of the 70 had been played. Ó Baoill had a bit of a soccer background and had fired home one of the penalties that had downed Armagh in the 2024 Ulster Final, so he knew many tricks of the trade. Instead of firing wide though, he opted to hit the target. Mayo goalkeeper Colm Reape fumbled and nearly let the ball in under him. Ó Baoill even had to run forward, as players do when there might be a rebound. But to the relief of everyone on both sides, Reape gathered and prevented the ball from going into the Mayo net. Shortly afterwards, with play continuing, a Hugh McFadden attempt at a point rattled off the angle of post and crossbar and nearly went into the Mayo goal. It was another narrow escape. But soon the hooter sounded and Donegal had consigned Mayo to a league final (which they lost anyway). Donegal ultimately finished in fourth position, two positions below what would have caused them to qualify for further league play. This is exactly what happened in 2012 when Donegal also finished two positions below the league semi-final positions and, in 2012, one position above being relegated, such was the precision of McGuinness's planning that year. Donegal followed through their narrow escape from having to play in a league final by retaining the Ulster title, just as they had done in 2012, when McGuinness had his first go at managing Donegal. The All-Ireland turned out to be more like 2014 though. Ulster opposition accounted for in the quarter-final (Armagh first time round, Monaghan this time), then Leinster opposition dispatched in the semi-final (Dublin first time round, Meath this time, with Donegal scoring three goals in both semi-finals). But Donegal could only play what was put in front of them. McGuinness had no control over that. Then Munster opposition in the final and - ominously - it was to be Kerry, again.

== Supporters ==
The team has an official supporters' club called, simply, Donegal GAA Supporters' Club. The chairperson is Father Brian Quinn, the secretary is Catriona McCaffrey and the joint treasurers are Grace Boyle and Brendan Brady. It existed from the early 1990s until 2006 before being resurrected following the winning 2012 All-Ireland SFC campaign. The aim of the club is to provide financial assistance to the team.

Daniel O'Donnell has performed fundraising concerts for the team. He and his wife Majella are regular spectators at games. O'Donnell was at Croke Park for the 1992 All-Ireland SFC final and sang a duet with manager Jim McGuinness at the 2012 All-Ireland SFC homecoming in Donegal Town. Former Ireland international goalkeeper Shay Given is a supporter and has helped trained the team. Séamus Coleman is another prominent supporter who has attended games. Actor Matthew Broderick is another supporter of the team. The "banana bunch" were noted for bringing inflatable bananas to games in the early 1990s. Christy Murray and his bagpipes have featured in the approach to and aftermath of games for several decades.

== Colours and crest ==
Donegal play since foundation in green and gold kits, which are also the colours of the board's logo and of the county crest, because they recall the gold of the sandy beaches of the county and the green of the well known Hills of Donegal. Despite the colours having always been the same during the years, their disposal has been very different for much of the team's history. The classic Donegal kit was composed of a green shirt with a golden hoop, white shorts and green and gold socks (identical to Kerry). In 1966, the board opted for golden shirts but they turned green after only a short period, in the 1980s also often with green shorts. In 1992, when the team reached the All-Ireland SFC semi-final against Mayo, it had to use a change kit, which was a gold shirt with green sleeves and green shorts. With an unexpected victory coming against the favorite Connacht side, Donegal decided to retain this colour combination for the final against Dublin. Donegal won a first All-Ireland SFC title and, since then, the team has favoured a yellow/gold shirt and green shorts.

Usually Donegal wore as change kit gold shirts with green trim, or gold shirts with black trim (recalling Ulster GAA colours). Since the team switched to gold as its primary colour, change kits have been green or white.

Ahead of the 2022 season, a new kit was launched, featuring a "shadow print" naming each of the county's clubs. It was replaced ahead of the 2024 season.

Ahead of the 2026 season, a new retro style jersey was launched.

=== Kit evolution ===
Classic kit	Ulster Final 1983	Ulster Final 1990	All-Ireland Final 1992	2005–08	Ulster Final 2011	All-Ireland Final 2014	Ulster Finals 2018 and 2019

=== Team sponsorship ===
The following companies have sponsored Donegal.

Period	Kit manufacturer	Shirt sponsor
1991	O'Neills	Donegal Chips
1992	O'Neills	Donegal Creameries
1992–1993	O'Neills	Magee Tailored
1994–1996	O'Neills	Donegal China
1996–1999	O'Neills	Donegal Creameries
2000–2002	O'Neills	Abbey Hotel
2003–2009	Azzurri	Abbey Hotel
2010–2013	Azzurri	Donegal Creameries
2014–2015	O'Neills	Donegal Creameries
2016–2021	O'Neills	KN Group
2022	O'Neills	Circet

Evolve Clothing has supplied the team with casual and formal attire on All-Ireland SFC and Ulster SFC final days.

== Managerial history ==
Some of those asked if they were interested in succeeding Declan Bonner as manager in 2022 cited social media abuse as a reason for their lack of interest.

Dates	Name	Origin	Honours	Notes
?	Columba McDyer	Glenties	?	—N/a
1972–1975	Brian McEniff	St Joseph's	1972 Ulster Senior Football Championship, 1974 Ulster Senior Football Championship	Player-manager
1975–1976	John Hannigan	St Eunan's	?	—N/a
1976–1977	Brian McEniff (2)	St Joseph's	—N/a	—N/a
1977–1980	Sean O'Donnell	Dungloe	—N/a	—N/a
1980–1986	Brian McEniff (3)	Réalt na Mara	1983 Ulster Senior Football Championship	—N/a
1986–1989	Tom Conaghan	Four Masters	?	—N/a
1989–1994	Brian McEniff (4)	Réalt na Mara	1990 Ulster Senior Football Championship, 1992 Ulster Senior Football Championship, 1992 All-Ireland Senior Football Championship	—N/a
1994–1997	P. J. McGowan	Seán MacCumhaills	?	—N/a
1997–2000	Declan Bonner	Na Rossa	—N/a	—N/a
2000–2002	Mickey Moran		?	—N/a
2003–2005	Brian McEniff (5)	Réalt na Mara	—N/a	—N/a
2006–2008	Brian McIver		2007 National Football League	—N/a
2008–2010	John Joe Doherty	Naomh Columba	?	—N/a
2010–2014	Jim McGuinness	Naomh Conaill	2011 Ulster Senior Football Championship, 2012 Ulster Senior Football Championship, 2012 All-Ireland Senior Football Championship, 2014 Ulster Senior Football Championship	—N/a
2014–2017	Rory Gallagher		—N/a	—N/a
2017–2022	Declan Bonner (2)	Na Rossa	2018 Ulster Senior Football Championship, 2019 Ulster Senior Football Championship	—N/a
2022–2023	Paddy Carr	Gaeil Fhánada	—N/a	—N/a
2023–	Jim McGuinness (2)	Naomh Conaill	2024 Ulster Senior Football Championship	—N/a

== Players ==
=== Records ===
==== Most appearances ====
As of 1 May 2020. Neil McGee's total is from 2022, when he retired.

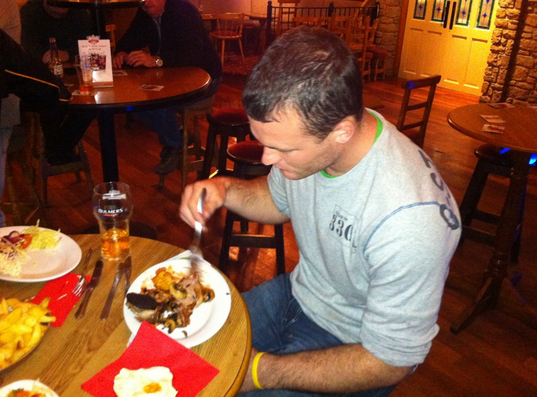
Neil McGee has the most senior appearances in the history of Donegal (195), breaking Colm McFadden's record (173) in 2019.

- The following are among those to have made the highest number of appearances for the senior team:

#	Name	Career	Apps
1	Neil McGee	2006–2022	195 or 194
2	Colm McFadden	2002–2016	173
3	Frank McGlynn	2006–2019	172
4	Christy Toye	2002–2016	163
5	Brian Roper	1995–2009	159
6	Michael Murphy	2007–2022; 2025–	156 (Note: Michael Murphy's total is not updated to include appearances he made in the years before his retirement, or since his return.)
7	Eamon McGee	2004–2016	154
8	Karl Lacey	2004–2017	148
9	Matt Gallagher	1981–1995	147
10	Rory Kavanagh	2002–2016	146
11	Neil Gallagher	2003–2017	140
12	Martin McHugh	1981–1994	138
13	Brendan Dunleavy	1975–1989	137
13	Paul Durcan	2004–2015	137
15	Adrian Sweeney	1996–2008	136
16	Donal Reid	1983–1993	135
17	Gary Walsh	1984–1996	133
18	Brian Murray	1984–1998	131
19	Seamus Bonner	1972–1985	129
19	Joyce McMullan	1982–1994	129
21	Michael Hegarty	1999–2011	127
22	Noel McCole	1974–1984	123
22	Anthony Molloy	1982–1994	123
22	Kevin Cassidy	2002-2011	123
25	Damian Diver	1995–2006	120

==== Top scorers ====
Updated 14 August 2018.

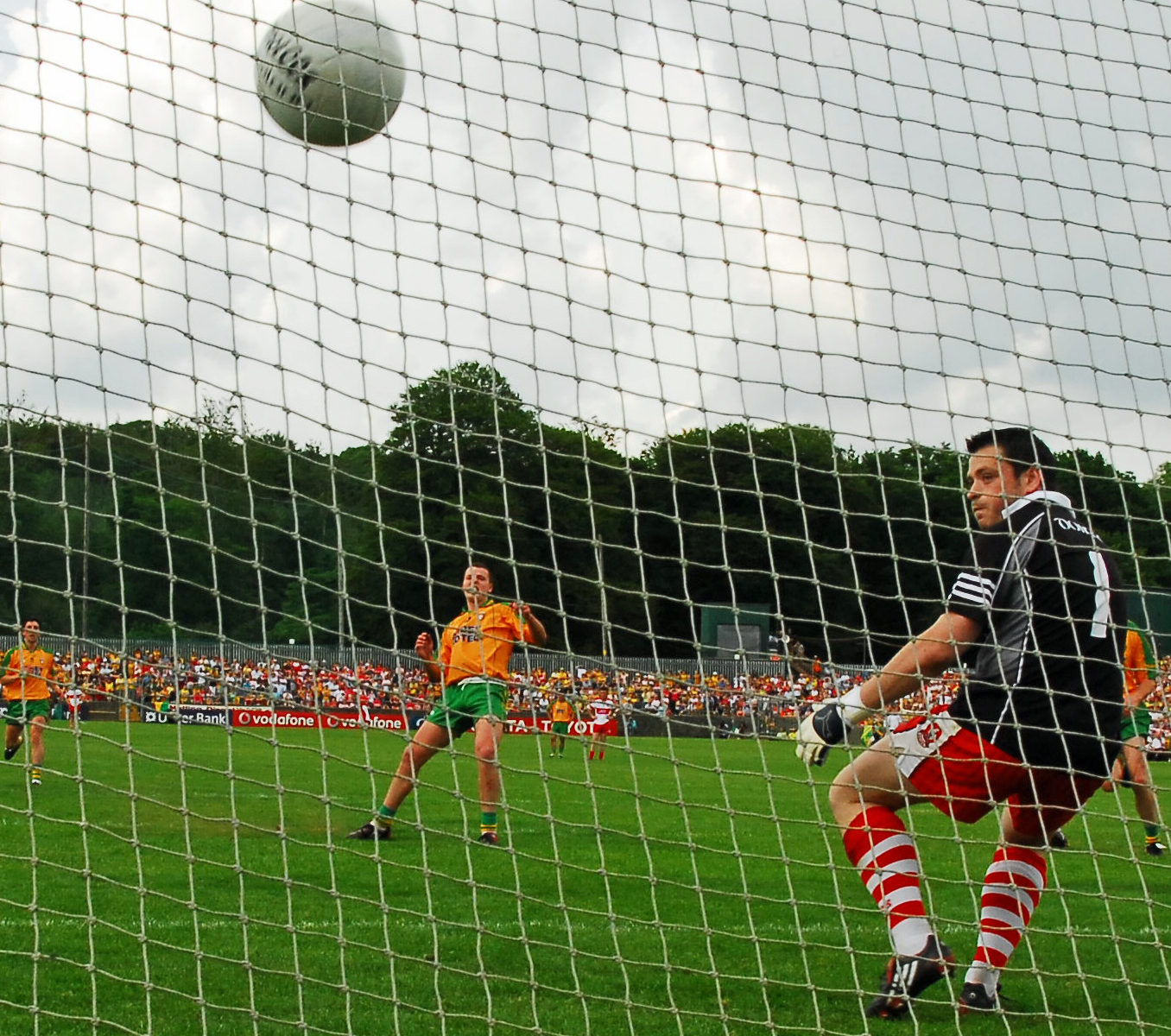
Michael Murphy is Donegal's top scorer with more than 500 points.

#	Name	Career	Total	Goals	Points	Apps	Average
1	Michael Murphy	2007–2022; 2025–	577 (Note: As of August 2018.)	28	493	142	4.06
2	Colm McFadden	2002–2016	513	25	438	173	2.97
3	Martin McHugh	1981–1994	444	16	396	138	3.22
4	Manus Boyle	1985–1998	350	14	308	116	3.22
5	Adrian Sweeney	1996–2008	340	16	292	136	2.5
6	Brendan Devenney	1998–2009	312	22	246	104	3
7	Tony Boyle	1992–2001	269	20	209	107	2.51
8	Patrick McBrearty	2011–	261	7	240	96	2.72
9	Declan Bonner	1983–1995	229	12	193	110	2.08

=== Player of the Year ===
Year	Winner	Club
1960	Seamus Hoare	St Eunan's
1961		
1962	Frankie McFeely	Seán MacCumhaills
1963	Brendan McFeely	Seán MacCumhaills
1964	Paul Kelly	Cloich Cheann Fhaola
1965	P. J. Flood	Four Masters
1966	P. J. Flood (2)	Four Masters
1967	John Hannigan	St Eunan's
1968	Brian McEniff	St Joseph's
1969	Declan O'Carroll	St Joseph's
1970	John Boyle	
1985	Brendan Dunleavy	Seán MacCumhaills
1986	Martin Shovlin	Naomh Ultan
1987	Noel McCole	Dungloe
1988	Anthony Molloy	Ardara
1989	Gary Walsh	Aodh Ruadh
1990	Anthony Molloy (2)	Ardara
1991	Matt Gallagher	Naomh Bríd
1992	Barry McGowan	Killybegs
1993	Marty Carlin	Red Hughs (Killygordon)
1994	Sylvester Maguire	Aodh Ruadh
1995		
1996	Barry McGowan (2)	Killybegs
1997	Jim McGuinness	Naomh Conaill
1998	Brendan Devenney	St Eunan's
1999	Brendan Devenney (2)	St Eunan's
2000	Damian Diver	Ardara
2001	Mark Crossan	St Eunan's
2002	Adrian Sweeney	Dungloe
2003	Barry Monaghan	Four Masters
2004	Damian Diver (2)	Ardara
2005	Neil Gallagher	Glenswilly
2006	Karl Lacey	Four Masters
2007	Rory Kavanagh	St Eunan's
2008	Brian Roper	Aodh Ruadh
2009	Michael Murphy	Glenswilly
2010		
2011	Karl Lacey (2)	Four Masters
2012	Colm McFadden	St Michael's
2013	Michael Murphy (2)	Glenswilly
2014	Neil Gallagher (2)	Glenswilly
2015	Frank McGlynn	Glenfin
2016	Ryan McHugh	Kilcar
2017	Patrick McBrearty	Kilcar
2018	Eoghan Bán Gallagher	Killybegs
2019	Michael Murphy (3)	Glenswilly

== Competitive record ==
Donegal's only National Football League title win is from 2007, with Brian McIver as manager. Below is the team that defeated Mayo in the final.

- 1 Paul Durcan
- 2 Neil McGee
- 3 Karl Lacey
- 4 Paddy Campbell
- 5 Barry Dunnion
- 6 Barry Monaghan
- 7 Paddy McConigley
- 8 Neil Gallagher (c)
- 9 Kevin Cassidy
- 10 Brian Roper
- 11 Ciaran Bonner
- 12 Christy Toye
- 13 Colm McFadden
- 14 Brendan Devenney
- 15 Michael Hegarty

Subs used: Kevin McMenamin for Devenney; Thomas Donoghue for McConigley; Eamon McGee for N. McGee; Rory Kavanagh for N. Gallagher; Adrian Sweeney for Bonner

Subs not used: Denis Boyle; Michael Boyle; Ryan Bradley; Benny Byrne; Michael Doherty; Joe Friel; Frank McGlynn; Johnny McLoone; Anthony Thompson; Leon Thompson; Peter Witherow

Other panel members included: Conall Dunne

== Honours ==
Official honours, with additions noted.

=== National ===
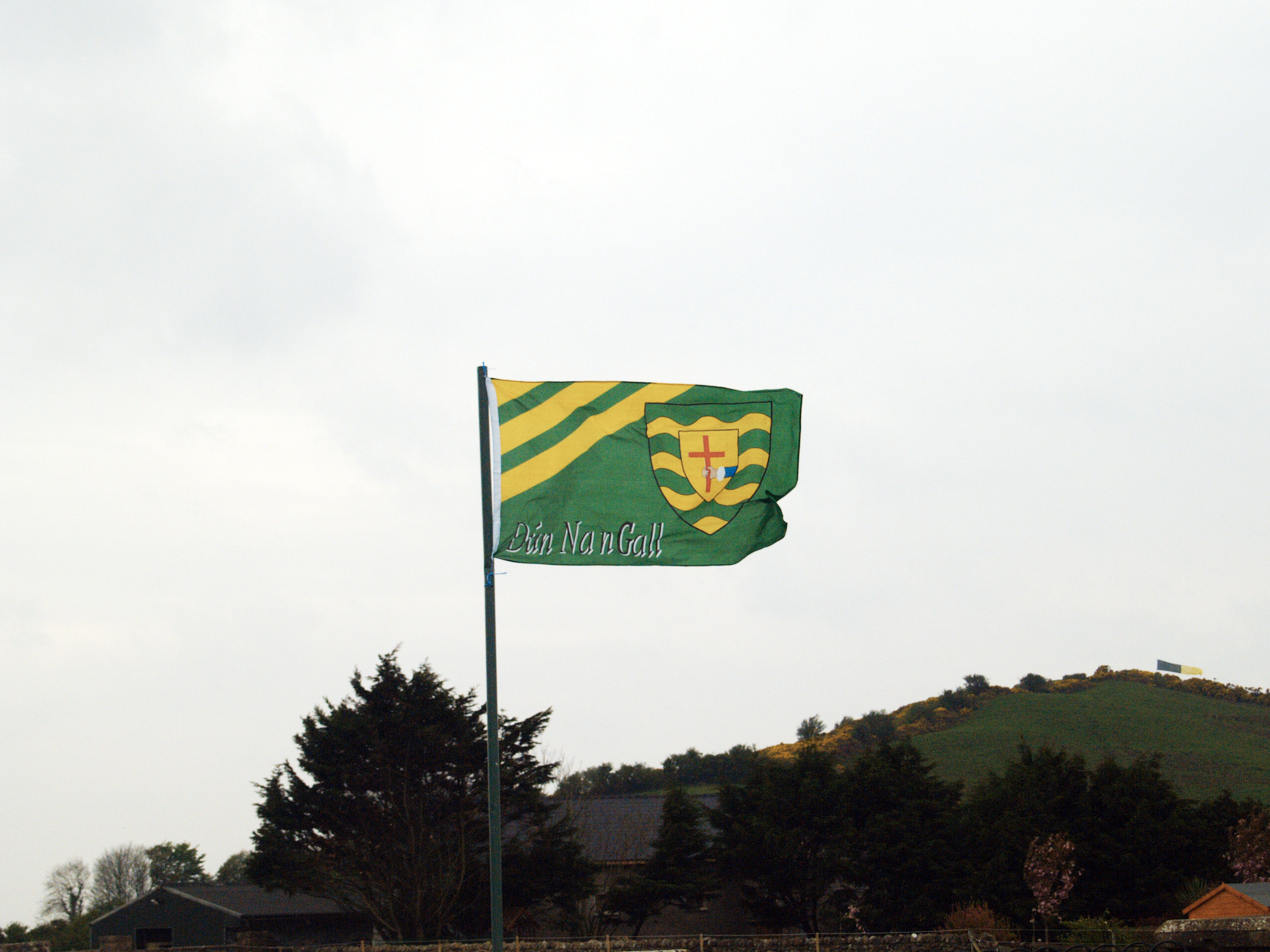
The Donegal flag displayed on the day the county won the National Football League for the first time in 2007

- All-Ireland Senior Football Championship
  - (gold) Winners (2): 1992, 2012
  - (silver) Runners-up (2): 2014, 2025
- National Football League
  - (gold) Winners (2): 2007, 2026
  - (silver) Runners-up (3): 1992–93, 1994–95, 1995–96
- National Football League Division 2
  - (gold) Winners (3): 2011, 2019, 2024
- All-Ireland Under 21 Football Championship
  - (gold) Winners (2): 1982, 1987
  - (silver) Runners-up (1): 2010
- All-Ireland Minor Football Championship
  - (silver) Runners-up (1): 2014
- All-Ireland Vocational Schools Championship
  - (gold) Winners (6): 1984, 1985, 1995, 1996, 2002, 2011
- RTÉ Team of the Year Award
  - (gold) Winners (1): 2012

=== Provincial ===
- Ulster Senior Football Championship
  - (gold) Winners (12): 1972, 1974, 1983, 1990, 1992, 2011, 2012, 2014, 2018, 2019, 2024, 2025
- Ulster Junior Football Championship
  - (gold) Winners (5): 1930, 1933, 1939, 1952, 1954
- Ulster Under-21 Football Championship
  - (gold) Winners (8): 1963, 1964, 1966, 1982, 1987, 1995, 2010, 2017
- Ulster Minor Football Championship
  - (gold) Winners (7): 1956, 1985, 1991, 1996, 2006, 2014, 2016
- Ulster Vocational Schools Football Championship
  - (gold) Winners (15): 1964, 1965, 1984, 1985, 1986, 1987, 1992, 1994, 1995, 1996, 2002, 2010, 2011, 2012, 2013
- Dr McKenna Cup
  - (gold) Winners (11): 1963, 1965, 1967, 1975, 1985, 1991, 2001, 2002, 2009, 2010, 2018
- Dr Lagan Cup
  - (gold) Winners (4): 1952, 1965, 1966, 1967
