= The System (Gaelic football) =

In Gaelic football, "The System" (Irish: An Córas) is a style of play pioneered by the Donegal senior football team during the 2010s. It is regarded as having caused a revolution in the sport, with establishment counties unable to comprehend it or work out how to deal with it. The System was used during the managerial reign of Jim McGuinness with Donegal, who overcame traditionally stronger counties to win two Ulster Senior Football Championships and one All-Ireland Senior Football Championship in the space of two years.

Donegal's winning of the 2012 All-Ireland Senior Football Championship was described as "one of the great GAA managerial coups" in history. Prior to this, Donegal had had little success in the Championship since 1992. Admirers of "The System" from other sports reportedly included Europe's 2014 Ryder Cup captain Paul McGinley and the soccer manager Neil Lennon.

Joe Brolly said as early as 2011 that "Gaelic football has never seen anything like it." Malachy Clerkin, writing in The Irish Times on 27 December 2012, described Donegal as "the alpha, the omega, and everything in between [...] just a sheer joy to watch".

Donegal didn't just dominate football in winning this year's All-Ireland. They reimagined it. They took a game that had been listing for a few years and made it a thrilling experience. In so doing, they interrupted the decision-making cycle of every team they met. Each game Donegal suited up for this summer was played on their terms, not the opposition's. When you consider the opposition – Cavan, Derry, Tyrone, Down, Kerry, Cork and Mayo – you can't but marvel at the achievement.

== Format ==
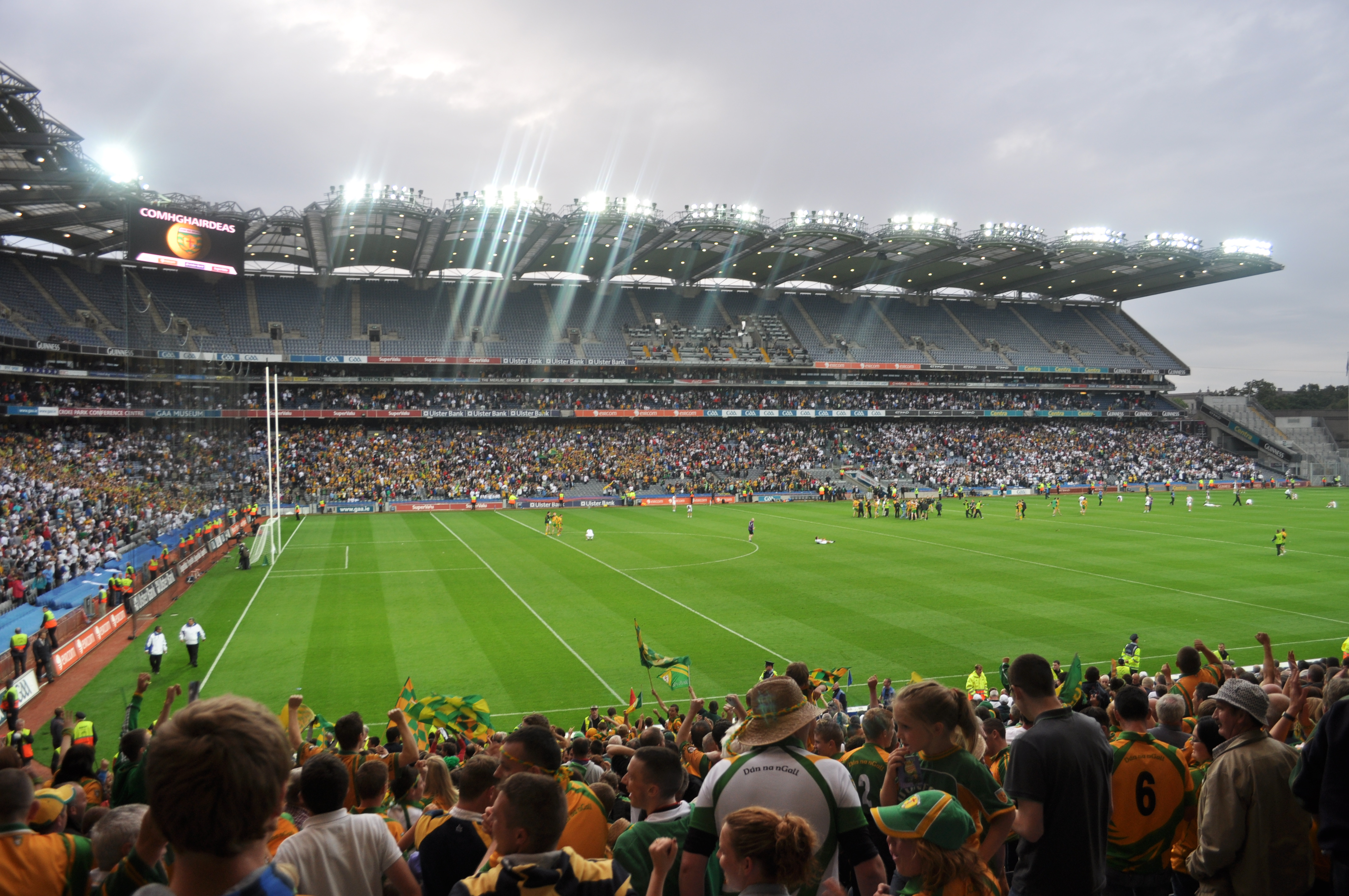
An early incarnation of "The System" saw Donegal overpower Kildare in the 2011 All-Ireland Senior Football Championship in Jim McGuinness's first season in charge.

The format of "The System" has provoked much debate among Gaelic football analysts. Former Derry footballer and RTÉ analyst Joe Brolly, after watching Donegal overpower his county's team in the 2012 Ulster Senior Football Championship, wrote a column prophesying an All-Ireland win for Donegal due to the team being, he concluded, "virtually unbeatable". He was proven correct when Donegal retained the Ulster Senior Football Championship they had won the previous year, before going on to win the Sam Maguire Cup for the first time in twenty years. Brolly proposed at the time that Donegal were capable of swallowing entire teams into a vacuum. Keith Duggan—writing in The Irish Times after the 2012 All-Ireland Senior Football Championship Final—contested this notion, instead proposing that teams encountering Donegal had fallen apart due to their own weaknesses and that Donegal had merely exploited this. However, Duggan acknowledged that Donegal had "expanded the possibilities" of Gaelic football.

Under "The System", players whose careers were thought to be behind them have been revived. Players such as Ryan Bradley and Anthony Thompson emerged as if coming from nowhere. The top teams in Gaelic football— Tyrone, Kerry and Cork, who had dominated the sport over the previous decade — have been made to appear merely ordinary, and have been swatted aside with relative ease.

Traditional Gaelic football formations are rendered redundant under The System. A corner-back such as Frank McGlynn—who had never scored a point in his Championship career before scoring 1–4 in 2012—has been turned into ruthless attacking players, while corner-forwards—the traditional scorers—contribute to the team's overall defensive efforts.

== Notable successes ==
The System was successfully used by Donegal to win the 2011 Ulster Senior Football Championship, the 2012 Ulster Senior Football Championship and the 2012 All-Ireland Senior Football Championship. Donegal's comprehensive defeat of Kerry in their 2012 All-Ireland Senior Football Championship quarter-final meeting was described by the national media as "the most seismic result in [Kerry] since the 1987 Munster final replay defeat to Cork".

Ahead of the 2012 All-Ireland Senior Football Championship semi-final against Cork, nobody outside the county gave Donegal a chance, and Cork went into the game as heavy favourites to win the title itself, even though this was only the semi-final. Donegal deployed The System to devour the heavily fancied Cork team and progressed to their first title decider since 1992. Tyrone's three-time All-Ireland winning manager Mickey Harte, attempting to analyse the game for the BBC, expressed his shock: "To be honest, I could not see that coming. Donegal annihilated Cork, there is no other word for it."

Donegal then unleashed The System on Mayo in the 2012 All-Ireland Senior Football Championship Final, rendering them motionless with two early goals and keeping them scoreless for the first sixteen minutes of the match. The first goal occurred in the third minute of the game, when Donegal captain Michael Murphy lashed the ball into the net, having collected a high ball delivered by Karl Lacey. Championship Matters named it "Goal of the Championship". In the eleventh minute, Patrick McBrearty's attempt at scoring a point came crashing off the Mayo post. Mayo's Kevin Keane fumbled, dropping the ball into the path of Colm McFadden who promptly slotted it into the back of the net for a second Donegal goal. McFadden, who scored a total of 1–03 for Donegal in the first half alone, was soon through on goal again, only for Mayo goalkeeper David Clarke to block the strike.

The System returned in full force in the 2014 Championship, with Donegal defeating Dublin in the semi-final to produce one of the most shocking results in Championship history. After the game, The System was cited by the media as having been behind the outcome.

== Views of opponents ==
Cork's Donncha O'Connor said of Donegal in 2012, "Every fella knows what the next fella's going to do. It's probably a bit dangerous if you're concentrating on what Donegal do, but it's just that they have a system. Whether they're up or down, they stick to it." His teammate Ciarán Sheehan said in 2014, "I played against Donegal in the All-Ireland semi final a few years back, their power and fitness was something else and unfortunately we couldn't match them. I think they're definitely back to those levels and with that power and physicality you can never underestimate them and they're well worth their place in the [All-Ireland] final [against Kerry]."

== Criticisms ==
Pat Spillane famously branded Donegal's style of play "Shi'ite football". He also criticised Jim McGuinness during the early development of The System—"There are people who go to the Hague for war crimes – I tell you this, some of the coaches nowadays should be up for crimes against Gaelic football". Less than a year before McGuinness led his team to All-Ireland success, Vincent Hogan branded him "a leader of sheep" in a famous newspaper article.

== View of McGuinness ==
After defeat to Mayo in 2013 McGuinness said:

Our system is exactly the same every single year. It was the same in 2010 when we were with the under-21s. And that is the reason why we won the All Ireland in 2012. We'll go back and we'll identify all the things that we're talking about here to day – injuries, hunger for the game, what would we have done better ourselves, what could we have got right in terms of the whole season and of the game today. And once we've done all that, we'll know a lot more about the situation. That would normally take two to three weeks. On the back of 2011 we knew we had to go more offensive. That's why we didn't get over the line in 2011 and we put a huge emphasis on the attacking side of the game in 2012 to get us over the line. And it was that analysis that brought us over the line last year. That whole process has to happen again now. To me, it only makes sense at the end of a cycle to look at where you went right and where you went wrong and see what you would have changed.
