= Frank McGlynn (Gaelic footballer) =

Donegal Gaelic footballer (born 1985)

Personal information
- Native name: Proinsias Mac Fhloinn (Irish)
- Born: Cloghan, County Donegal
- Occupation: Primary school teacher
- Height: 5 ft 11 in (180 cm)

Sport
- Sport: Gaelic football
- Position: Right half back
Club
- Years: Club
- 2004–: Glenfin
Inter-county
Years	County	Apps (scores)
2006–2019	Donegal	100+ (1–4+)
Inter-county titles
- Ulster titles: 5
- All-Irelands: 1
- NFL: 1
- All Stars: 1

Frank McGlynn (born 1985) is an Irish Gaelic football manager and former player. He played for the Donegal county team between 2006 and 2019 and also for his club Glenfin.

In 2015, Pat Spillane included McGlynn in his top 40 footballers in the game today.

He won one All Star, one All-Ireland Senior Football Championship and five Ulster Senior Football Championships with his county. He was shortlisted for All Stars Footballer of the Year in 2012, but the award went to teammate Karl Lacey.

== Playing career ==
=== Youth ===
McGlynn played association football for Drumkeen United as a child. He has also played soccer for Finn Harps at underage level. He earned him trials with Wolverhampton Wanderers, Leeds United, Preston North End in soccer's English Football League. He played and scored for Everton in the Milk Cup – in a team which also featured Wayne Rooney. He was still playing the association code for Cappry Rovers after retiring from playing football for Donegal (though he prioritised his football for his club Glenfin).

McGlynn's childhood hero was Martin Gavigan.

=== Club ===
McGlynn won the Donegal Intermediate Football Championship with Glenfin in 2018.

=== Inter-county ===
McGlynn made his senior inter-county debut in 2006.

==== Jim McGuinness: 2010–14 ====
A prominent part of the inter-county teams of the Jim McGuinness era, McGlynn won his first Ulster Senior Football Championship winners' medal with Donegal on 17 July 2011, becoming the first man from the Glenfin club to achieve this. He had a terrific game on 22 July 2012 as Donegal retained the Ulster title for the first time in their history with a 2–18 to 0–13 victory over Down. His goal that day sealed the win and remains the only goal he has scored for his county as of November 2026.

McGlynn's first Championship point only came in the 2012 Ulster Senior Football Championship. This was against Cavan; he followed this with a point against Derry, that goal against Down in the provincial final and yet another point in the All-Ireland Senior Football Championship semi-final victory against Cork. He added another point against Mayo in the 2012 All-Ireland Senior Football Championship Final, bringing his 2012 championship season total to 1–4. For a player in the left-full-back position this has been described as "def[ying] convention". He won an All Star but was unable to attend the Football Tour of New York.

Coming in the 2013 Ulster Senior Football Championship, McGlynn was concussed, as was teammate Ryan Bradley, causing manager McGuinness to voice fears that one of his players would receive a spinal injury or a neck injury if the "'dangerous' levels of physicality in the GAA" continued.

McGlynn made his 100th inter-county appearance against Armagh in the 2014 Dr McKenna Cup. He added a third Ulster SFC title later that year.

==== Rory Gallagher: 2014–17 ====
Under the management of Rory Gallagher, McGlynn started the opening fixture of the 2015 National Football League at home to Derry. He also started the next game against Dublin at Croke Park, the third fixture against Cork in Ballyshannon, the fourth fixture against Monaghan and the seventh fixture against Mayo. Donegal qualified for the NFL semi-final. McGlynn also started and completed this game.

McGlynn started the 2015 Ulster Senior Football Championship final, scoring 0–1. He had previously started the preliminary round against Tyrone (scoring 0–1), the quarter-final against Armagh and the semi-final against Derry. McGlynn started the 2015 All-Ireland Senior Football Championship qualifier defeat of Galway at Croke Park and the next game against Mayo at the same venue.

McGlynn started the opening fixture of the 2016 National Football League away to Down and scored 0–1. He started the second fixture against Cork, a ten-point win in Ballyshannon, contributing 0–1 to the team's victory. He also started the third fixture against Mayo and the seventh fixture against Monaghan. Donegal qualified for the NFL semi-final. McGlynn started this game too.

McGlynn started the 2016 Ulster Senior Football Championship final. He had previously started the quarter-final against Fermanagh (scoring 0–1), the semi-final against Monaghan and the semi-final replay against the same opposition (scoring 0–1). McGlynn scored 0–1 in the 2016 All-Ireland Senior Football Championship qualifier defeat of Cork at Croke Park and also started the next game against Dublin at the same venue.

McGlynn started the opening fixture of the 2017 National Football League against Kerry. He made a substitute appearance in the second fixture away to Roscommon. He started the third fixture against Dublin. He also started the fourth fixture against Cavan and scored 0–1. He did likewise in the fifth fixture against Tyrone and in the seventh fixture against Mayo.

McGlynn started the 2017 Ulster Senior Football Championship quarter-final victory against Antrim (scoring 0–1) and the semi-final loss to Tyrone. He also started both the 2017 All-Ireland Senior Football Championship qualifier defeat of Meath at Páirc Tailteann and the qualifier loss to Galway at Markievicz Park.

==== Declan Bonner: 2017–19 ====
Under the management of Declan Bonner, McGlynn played only in the final two games of the 2018 National Football League, against Monaghan and Mayo (both of which he started). His fourth Ulster SFC title came in 2018. McGlynn started the final against Fermanagh. He had previously started the preliminary round against Cavan, the quarter-final against Derry and the semi-final against Down.

Not featuring until the final round of the 2019 National Football League, he came on as a second-half substitute in the victory over Kildare. Donegal qualified for the National Football League Division 2 final and McGlynn made a substitute appearance in the game as Donegal defeated Meath to win the title. He collected his fifth and final Ulster SFC later that year, appearing as a second-half substitute for Neil McGee in the final against Cavan. He had previously made substitute appearances against Fermanagh in the quarter-final and Tyrone in the semi-final.

McGlynn announced his retirement form inter-county football on 5 November 2019.

== After playing ==
McGlynn was appointed manager of his club Glenfin in November 2024.

== Personal life ==
McGlynn is married to Diane, who also plays for their club Glenfin. They have three children. A teacher by profession, he has taught at Stramore National School, Glendowan, Churchill, Glenswilly. He enjoys darts and cards.

== Honours ==
Donegal

- All-Ireland Senior Football Championship: 2012
- Ulster Senior Football Championship: 2011, 2012, 2014, 2018, 2019
- National Football League Division 1: 2007
- National Football League Division 2: 2011, 2019
- Dr McKenna Cup: 2009, 2010

Glenfin

- Donegal Intermediate Football Championship: 2018

Individual

- The Star Player of the Year: 2012
- All Star: 2012 (Nominated in 2011, 2014, 2015)
- Irish News Ulster All-Star: 2011, 2012
- The Sunday Game Team of the Year: 2012
- Donegal News Sports Personality Winner: June 2012
- Donegal Footballer of the Year: 2015
