= 2015 Ulster Senior Football Championship =

2015 Ulster SFC
Tournament details
- Year: 2015

Winners
- Champions: Monaghan (16th win)
- Manager: Malachy O'Rourke
- Captain: Conor McManus

Runners-up
- Runners-up: Donegal
- Manager: Rory Gallagher
- Captain: Michael Murphy

The 2015 Ulster Senior Football Championship is the 127th instalment of the annual Ulster Senior Football Championship held under the auspices of Ulster GAA. It was one of the four provincial competitions of the 2015 All-Ireland Senior Football Championship. Donegal were the reigning champions following the 2014 Championship but lost to Monaghan in the final on 19 July by a point.

== Teams ==
The Ulster championship is contested by the nine county teams in the province of Ulster.

Team	Colours	Sponsor	Manager	Captain	Most recent success
Team	Colours	Sponsor	Manager	Captain	All-Ireland	Provincial
Antrim	Saffron and white	Creagh Concrete	Liam Bradley	Aodhán Gallagher		1951
Armagh	Orange and white	Rainbow Communications	Kieran McGeeney	Ciarán McKeever	2002	2008
Cavan	Royal blue and white	Kingspan Group	Terry Hyland	Alan Clarke	1952	1997
Derry	Red and white	Specialist Joinery Group	Brian McIver	Mark Lynch	1993	1998
Donegal	Gold and green	Donegal Creameries	Rory Gallagher	Michael Murphy	2012	2014
Down	Red and black	Canal Court Hotel	Jim McCorry	Mark Poland	1994	1994
Fermanagh	Green and white	Tracey Concrete	Pete McGrath	Eoin Donnelly
Monaghan	White and blue	Investec	Malachy O'Rourke	Conor McManus		2013
Tyrone	White and Red	McAleer & Rushe	Mickey Harte	Seán Cavanagh	2008	2010

== 2015 Ulster Senior Football Championship ==
Preliminary round
Donegal	1-13
Tyrone	1-10

Quarter-finals
Cavan	0-15
Monaghan	0-16
Fermanagh	1-13
Antrim	0-08
Derry	0-12
Down	0-11
Armagh	0-08
Donegal	2-11

Semi-finals
Monaghan	1-20
Fermanagh	0-13
Derry	0-10
Donegal	1-09

Final
Monaghan	0-11
Donegal	0-10

== Fixtures ==
=== Preliminary round ===
17 May 2015
16:00
Preliminary round

Donegal	1–13 – 1–10	Tyrone
M McElhinney (1–2); M Murphy (0–3, 2 frees, 1 45); C Toye, C McFadden, P McBrearty (0–2 each); F McGlynn, K Lacey (0–1 each).	Report	S Cavanagh (0–4, 3 frees); D McCurry (1–0); C McAliskey (0–3); Justin McMahon, M Donnelly, R McNamee (0–1 each).

MacCumhaill Park, Ballybofey
Attendance: 17,435
Referee: Joe McQuillan (Cavan)

=== Quarter-finals ===
24 May 2015
14:00
Quarter-Final

Cavan	0–15 – 0–16	Monaghan
C Mackey (0–3, 2 frees); N McDermott (0–3 frees); G McKiernan and M Argue (both 0–2); M Dunne (0–2, 1 free); C Gilsenan (0–1 free); N Murray and R Flanagan (both 0–1).	Report	C McManus (0–7, 5 frees); P Finlay (0–3 frees); K Hughes (0–1 free); K O’Connell, D Hughes, D Clerkin, C Walshe and D Mone (all 0–1).

Kingspan Breffni Park, Cavan
Attendance: 18,541
Referee: Padraig Hughes (Armagh)

31 May 2015
16:00
Quarter-Final

Fermanagh	1–13 – 0–08	Antrim
S Quigley 1–4 (4f, 1pen), R Jones 0–3, B Mulrone 0–2, C Flaherty, T Corrigan, P McCusker, D Kille 0–1 each	Report	CJ McGourty 0–6 (6f), K McGourty 0–1, R Murray 0–1

Brewster Park, Enniskillen
Attendance: 7,726
Referee: Maurice Deegan (Laois)

7 June 2015
14:00
Quarter-Final

Derry	0–12 – 0–11	Down
M Lynch 0–5 (2f), E Bradley 0–5 (3f), E Lynn 0–1, C O'Boyle 0–1	Report	P Devlin 0–6 (6f), C Laverty, K McKernan 0–2 each, D O'Hare 0–1 (f)

Celtic Park, Derry
Attendance: 10,541
Referee: Eddie Kinsella (Laois)

14 June 2015
14:00
Quarter-Final

Armagh	0–08 – 2–11	Donegal
T Kernan 0–3 (1f), J Morgan, C McKeever, E Rafferty (f), A Findon, C Rafferty all 0–1 each.	Report	M Murphy 0–5 (5fs), P McBrearty 1–1, M O'Reilly 1–0, O MacNiallais 0–2, N Gallagher, M McElhinney, N Gallagher 0–1 each.

Athletic Grounds, Armagh
Attendance: 18,186
Referee: David Coldrick (Meath)

=== Semi-finals ===
21 June 2015
16:00
Semi-Final

Monaghan	1–20 – 0–13	Fermanagh
C McManus 1–6 (5f), K Hughes 0–3 (1f), O Duffy 0–3, K Duffy, D Hughes, C McGuinness, S Gollogly, N McAdam, D Mone, K O’Connell 0–1 each, R Beggan 0–1 (1 ’45).	Report	S Quigley 0–5 (4f), T Corrigan, R Jones, D McCusker 0–2 each, E Donnelly, A Breen 0–1 each.

Kingspan Breffni Park, Cavan
Attendance: 16,572
Referee: Padraig O'Sullivan (Kerry)

27 June 2015
19:00
Semi-Final

Derry	0–10 – 1–09	Donegal
M Lynch 0-02, 1f, E Bradley 0-02, 2f, C O’Boyle 0-02, C McKaigue 0-01, C McFaul 0-01; N Holly 0-01, B Heron 0-01.	Report	M O’Reilly 1-00 P McBrearty, 0-02, 1f, M Murphy 0-02, C McFadden 0-02, M McElhinney 0-01; C Toye 0-01, O MacNiallais 0-01.

St. Tiernach's Park, Clones
Attendance: 19,237
Referee: Rory Hickey (Clare)

=== Final ===
19 July 2015
14:00
Final

Monaghan	0–11 – 0–10	Donegal
C McManus 0–6 (4f), K O'Connell, O Duffy, K Duffy, D Mone, O Lennon 0–1 each.	Report	P McBrearty 0–6 (4f), M Murphy 0–2 (2f), K Lacey, F McGlynn 0–1 each

St. Tiernach's Park, Clones
Attendance: 31,997
Referee: David Coldrick (Meath)

== See also ==
- Fixtures and results
- 2015 All-Ireland Senior Football Championship
  - 2015 Connacht Senior Football Championship
  - 2015 Leinster Senior Football Championship
  - 2015 Munster Senior Football Championship
