= Karl Lacey =

Donegal Gaelic footballer (born 1984)

Personal information
- Native name: Carl de Lása (Irish)
- Born: 10 September 1984 (age 42) County Donegal, Ireland
- Occupation: Lecturer
- Height: 5 ft 9 in (175 cm)

Sport
- Sport: Gaelic football
- Position: Centre Back
Club
- Years: Club
- ?–: The Four Masters
Club titles
- Donegal titles: 1
Inter-county
| Years | County | Apps (scores) |
| 2004–2017 | Donegal | 148 (65 Championship) |
Inter-county titles
- Ulster titles: 3
- All-Irelands: 1
- NFL: 1
- All Stars: 4

Karl Lacey (born 10 September 1984) is an Irish Gaelic football coach, manager and former player for Four Masters and the Donegal county team.

His county's most decorated individual player, his personal achievements include four All Star awards—in 2006, 2009, 2011 and 2012— and the 2012 GAA/GPA Footballer of the Year. His other accolades include an All-Ireland Senior Football Championship title, three Ulster Senior Football Championship titles, a National Football League title, a Dr McKenna Cup, a Donegal Senior Football Championship title and three Sigerson Cups. Lacey's haul of Ulster SFC titles was a joint county team record (alongside such past players as Anthony Molloy, Martin McHugh, Joyce McMullan and Donal Reid) for four years until Patrick McBrearty, Neil McGee, Paddy McGrath, Leo McLoone, Frank McGlynn, Michael Murphy and Anthony Thompson surpassed it in 2018.

Considered very influential by many young footballers, Lacey was often spotted zipping around the field in his trademark white boots and white thermal shorts, and also dedicated time to voluntary work in aid of charitable organisations. Lacey's choice of shorts has been known to cause puzzlement among fans.

Known as a versatile defender and one of the best half-backs in Ireland, Lacey was able to play anywhere in the back six until his retirement from Donegal in 2017. He was a consistent performer and never far away from another All Star nomination. However, his doctor complained that Lacey was "flogged to the point of breakdown". Lacey put together a run of 41 consecutive championship appearances between the 2004 Ulster semi-final against Tyrone and 2013 Ulster quarter-final against Tyrone before injury broke his run. He made a total of 148 inter-county appearances. 65 were Championship appearances, a record he shares with Donegal teammate Christy Toye.

== Playing career ==
=== Club ===
With his club Four Masters, Lacey won the 2003 Donegal Senior Football Championship. He scored two second-half points in the final against Termon.

He has won one SFC, one U21FC and two MFC medals with his club. He went off injured at half-time in the 2012 Donegal Senior Football Championship semi-final against Naomh Conaill—and Four Masters lost.

In 2015, his club was relegated to Division 2 of the Donegal League in a play-off lost to Réalt na Mara.

=== College ===
Lacey captained Donegal to the 2002 All-Ireland Vocational Schools Football Championship, overcoming Kerry in the final. At college level, he won three Sigerson Cup medals, one with UUJ and two with Sligo IT.

=== Inter-county ===
==== 2003–2006: Early years ====
Much of Lacey's inter-county success came in his middle and later years. He was first called up to the senior team by Brian McEniff for winter training in 2003.

A substitute appearance against Antrim brought him his debut in 2004 under the management of McEniff.

Lacey played in the 2006 Ulster Senior Football Championship Final at Croke Park.

==== 2007–2011: NFL and Ulster success ====
Lacey was part of the Donegal team that won its first National League title in 2007 in the final against Mayo.

He went travelling abroad and missed the 2009 National Football League but was due to return for the 2009 All-Ireland Senior Football Championship.

The 2011 season began Donegal's renaissance under Jim McGuinness, an era for Lacey which coincided with his late career. Not only did he receive an All Star award and Ulster Championship medal in 2011, but Lacey also put in a number of great displays and usually kept each opponents danger man quiet while collecting a few scores himself. In the semi-final of the Ulster Championship, Lacey was deployed on Tyrone's in-form player, Brian McGuigan. Lacey excelled and kept McGuigan from having any real say in the game. Not only did he display his defensive qualities but he also showed his attacking side when he provided an assist for Colm McFadden's goal through a surging run from deep. He also set up the winning goal coming from Dermot Molloy which left the final score at 2–06 to 0–09. In the final they faced a strong Derry side, on-form after a huge win over Armagh. This time Lacey was deployed on another danger man, Mark Lynch. Donegal lifted their first Ulster Championship title in a number of years. Lacery received an All Star award and the Ulster Footballer of The Year Award.

==== 2012 season: Footballer of the Year and All-Ireland success ====
By kitting out for the 2012 Ulster Senior Football Championship Final, which his team won, Lacey made his 37th successive appearance for Donegal, beating the previous record set by Michael Hegarty.

On 5 August 2012, Lacey surged up the pitch and scored the point that sealed Donegal's comprehensive victory over Kerry in the All-Ireland Senior Football Championship quarter-final at Croke Park.

On 23 September 2012, he delivered a high ball towards team captain Michael Murphy who smashed the ball into the Mayo net after three minutes of the 2012 All-Ireland Senior Football Championship Final. He was also in possession at the final whistle and sent the ball clattering into the crowd with glee.

Told he would be awarded the 2012 GAA/GPA Footballer of the Year, he was in his car and nearly crashed. Then Arsène Wenger sent him a personal letter "on behalf of all the players and staff" at Highbury House who wanted to "take this opportunity to send our congratulations on recently winning the All-Ireland football championship." Then he attended the Football Tour of New York. Then he had a hip operation and put his feet up at home for the Christmas.

==== 2013–2017: Spitgate and decline ====
===== Tyrone spitting incident =====
Following a league game on 3 March 2013, footballer of the year Lacey was hit by some spit from the mouth of a Tyrone fan. Lacey was targeted as he left the pitch via the tunnel at Healy Park in Omagh. He had not been playing in the game due to a hip injury.

President O'Neill condemned the action against Lacey, "I have always said that any behaviour that makes anyone feel less good about themselves or about being involved in Gaelic games is abhorrent to me. I wouldn't condone that type of behaviour and to spit at anyone is disgraceful behaviour. I really cannot understand the behaviour of anybody who insults or demeans anyone. It has no part in Gaelic games. My message to those people is 'we don't need you'. I don't want them in our organisation and I don't want them going to our games. I would appeal to them to go and leave our games to people who want to come and enjoy themselves."

===== Post-spitgate =====
Following "spitgate", Lacey returned to training for Donegal on 30 April 2013 after attending a wedding in Malta. He declared his fitness ahead of Donegal's opening Ulster Championship clash with Tyrone, though he did not start the game; instead Jim McGuinness sprung him from the bench in the latter stages of Donegal's victory. Lacey then had keyhole knee surgery ahead of the Ulster semi-final against Down. He missed the match, ending a run of 41 consecutive championship appearances stretching back to 2004.

2014 brought Lacey a third Ulster title in four seasons. In the All-Ireland quarter-final against Armagh at Croke Park, Lacey was subjected to a vicious attack. During the same exchange the Donegal team doctor, Kevin Moran, was sent flying through the air, spiking a major reaction from national and social media.

Injured for the game against Galway in 2015, Lacey returned against Mayo.

He retired from inter-county football at the end of the season. He said he would continue to play with his club Four Masters.

=== Inter-provincial ===
Lacey won a Railway Cup medal with Ulster.

=== International ===
Lacey lined out for Ireland against Australia in the International Rules Series. He did so in 2006 and in 2011.

== Coaching and managerial career ==
Before retiring from inter-county football, Lacey was a strength and conditioning coach with the county under-age development squads. When Declan Bonner was reappointed manager of the Donegal senior team in 2017, and having recently retired from playing inter-county football, Lacey was included as part of Bonner's backroom team. Lacey departed after one year for family reasons and Stephen Rochford was appointed in his place. But Lacey actually carried on as part of the management team until the end of 2020, at which point he left having been involved since 2017.

Three weeks later, on 25 January 2021, he was announced as Donegal's GAA new Head of Academy Development. In February 2023, he announced his departure from this role.

Lacey was appointed as manager of Kilcoo for 2023, and led the club to the 2023 Down Senior Football Championship title. In November 2023, it was reported that he was to stay with Kilcoo for 2024. His departure from Kilcoo was announced at the end of January 2025, having led the club to the 2024 Down Senior Football Championship title and then to that year's Ulster Senior Club Football Championship final.

== Personal life ==
Lacey married Ciara McGroarty in the village of Cacela Velha on the Algarve in September 2017, shortly after announcing his retirement from inter-county football. The reception was held at the Praia Verde Boutique Hotel. The couple have a son, Noah, born in 2015. Lacey is a brother-in-law of Barry Dunnion.

Lacey has participated in a marketing campaign for Ireland West Airport. He said, "When the airport approached me about the ambassadorial role, I had no hesitation in accepting. As a frequent user of the airport I can see first hand the importance and invaluable role the airport plays for the region and it's a great asset for people living in Donegal and the North West region, providing employment, connectivity to over 25 destinations and so convenient, only a little over an hour down the road. I'm delighted to play my part in supporting the airport in this regard". He graduated from the University of Limerick (UL) with a master's in sports performance.

== Honours ==
Donegal

- All-Ireland Senior Football Championship: 2012
- Ulster Senior Football Championship: 2011, 2012, 2014
- National Football League Division 1: 2007
- National Football League Division 2: 2011
- Dr McKenna Cup: 2010
- All-Ireland Vocational Schools Championship 2002 (c)

Club

- Donegal Senior Football Championship: 2003

College

- Sigerson Cup: 2004, 2005 (Sligo IT), 2008 (UUJ)

International

- International Rules Series: 2011

Individual

- GAA/GPA Footballer of the Year: 2012
- All Star: 2006, 2009, 2011, 2012
  - Nominated in 2007
- Irish News Ulster All-Star: 2006, 2011, 2012
- The Sunday Game Player of the Year Award: 2012
- The Sunday Game Team of the Year: 2012
- Silver Jubilee Football Team of the Ulster GAA Writers Association (UGAAWA): 2012
- Donegal Sports Star of the Year Award: 2013
- In May 2012, the Irish Independent named him in its selection of Donegal's "greatest team" spanning the previous 50 years, one of only two players representing the county at that time to be included.
- In October 2019, Colm Keys named him as part of his "Football Team of the Decade" in the Irish Independent; Donegal's sole other inclusion was Michael Murphy.
