= Frank McGlynn =

Frank McGlynn may refer to:

- Frank McGlynn (Gaelic footballer)
- Frank McGlynn Sr., American actor

== See also ==
- Frank McLynn, British author and journalist
