= 2014 Ulster Senior Football Championship =

2014 Ulster SFC
Tournament details
- Year: 2014

Winners
- Champions: Donegal (8th win)
- Manager: Jim McGuinness
- Captain: Michael Murphy

Runners-up
- Runners-up: Monaghan
- Manager: Malachy O'Rourke
- Captain: Conor McManus

Championship venues

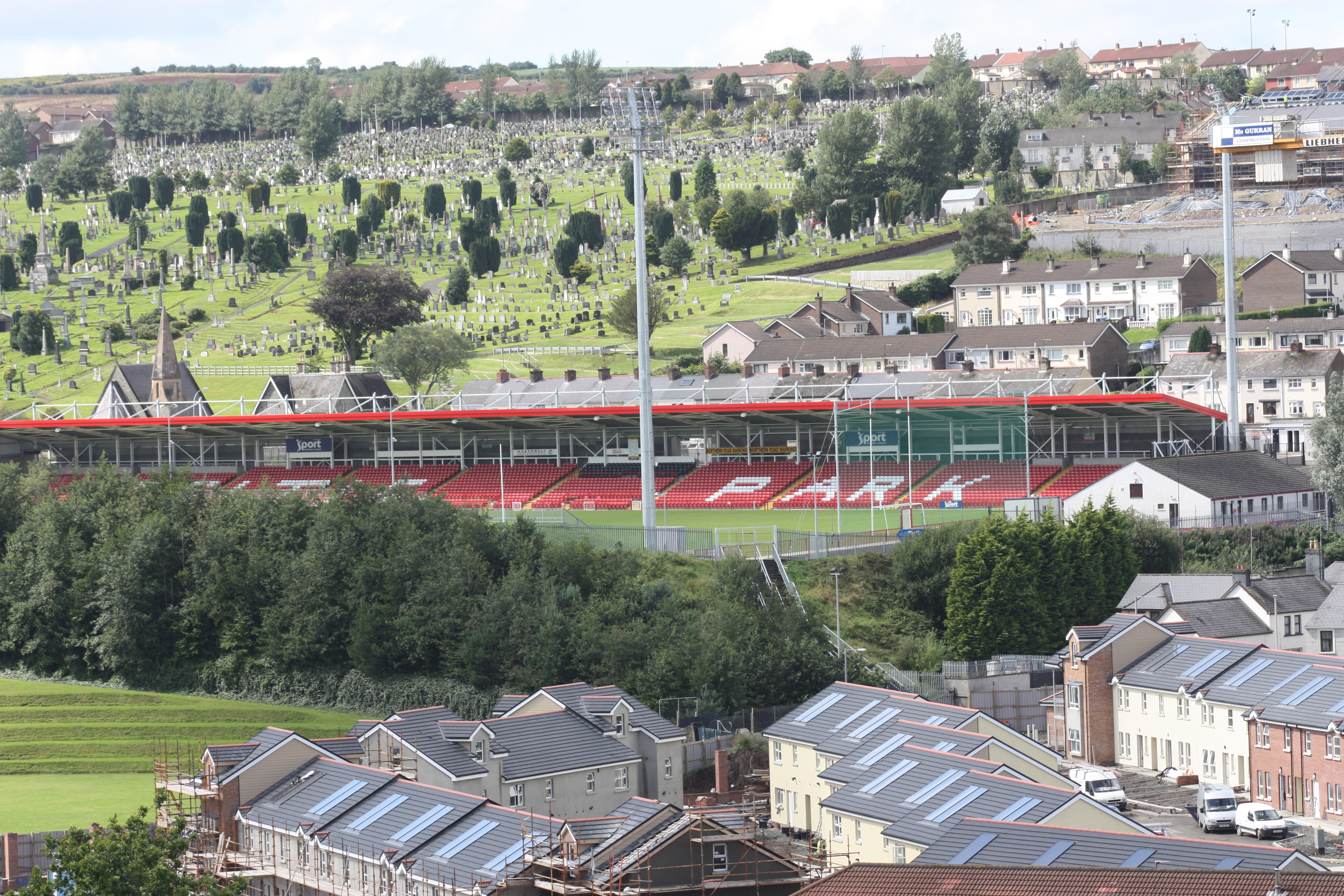
Celtic Park in the City of Derry

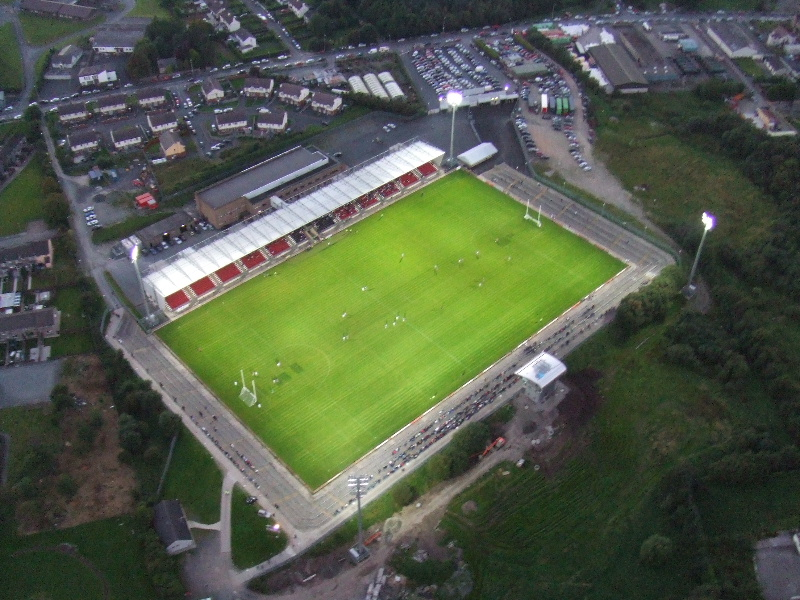
Healy Park in Omagh

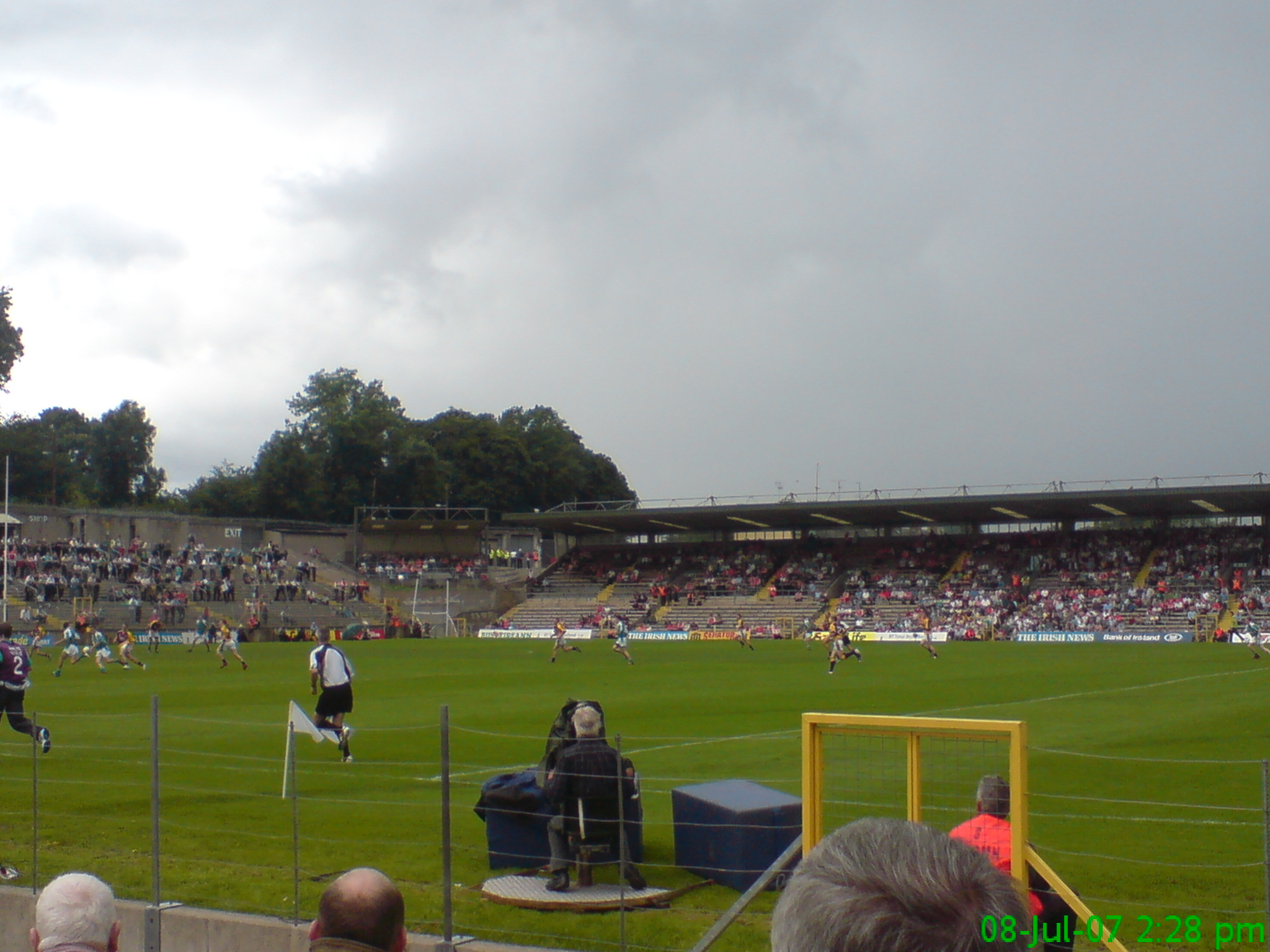
St Tiernach's Park in Clones

and others elsewhere...

The 2014 Ulster Senior Football Championship was the 126th installment of the annual Ulster Senior Football Championship held under the auspices of Ulster GAA. It was one of the four provincial competitions of the 2014 All-Ireland Senior Football Championship. Monaghan entered the competition as defending Ulster champions. They were dethroned by Donegal in the final.

The draw was made on 3 October 2013. Under new GAA rules, to allow counties to more easily predict the dates of their qualifier matches, the two sides of the draw were named as either A or B. Antrim, Derry, Donegal and Fermanagh were named on the A side of the draw, while Armagh, Cavan, Down, Monaghan and Tyrone's draw was named as the B side.

The opening game of the Ulster Championship was played on 18 May 2014, with Tyrone playing Down at Healy Park. The game ended level and the teams faced each other again the following week, with Tyrone advancing to the quarter-finals. In the first of the quarter-finals on 25 May 2014, Derry were beaten by Donegal, the Oak Leaf county losing by a goal in their home ground of Celtic Park. In the second quarter-final, which took place on 1 June 2014, Antrim narrowly beat Fermanagh, seeing the Saffrons through to their first Ulster semi-final since 2009.

A mass player brawl before kick-off marred the quarter-final meeting of Armagh and Cavan at the Athletic Grounds on 8 June 2014, with Cavan's star player Martin Dunne unable to play and his team losing by a goal and three points. Dunne sustained a broken hand and was seen watching the game with his arm in a sling. Reigning Ulster champions Monaghan overcame Tyrone by a single point on 15 June 2014, to earn the chance to face Armagh.

In the first semi-final on 22 June 2014, Antrim were beaten comfortably by Donegal with the total difference between the teams at full-time being 13 points. The second semi-final was much closer, the match between Armagh and Monaghan on 28 June 2014 ending level. In the replay on 6 July 2014, Monaghan were five-point victors, setting up a final against Donegal, a replay of the previous year's final.

The final took place on 20 July 2014. Having led 0-06 to 0-04 at half-time, Donegal won the match by three point on 0-15 to 1-09 scoreline, avenging the previous year's defeat to Monaghan in the final.

== Teams ==
The Ulster championship is contested by the nine county teams in the province of Ulster.

Team	Colours	Sponsor	Manager	Captain	Most recent success
Team	Colours	Sponsor	Manager	Captain	All-Ireland	Provincial
Antrim	Saffron and white	Creagh Concrete	Liam Bradley	Aodhán Gallagher		1951
Armagh	Orange and white	Rainbow Communications	Paul Grimley	Ciarán McKeever	2002	2008
Cavan	Royal blue and white	Kingspan Group	Terry Hyland	Alan Clarke	1952	1997
Derry	Red and white	Specialist Joinery Group	Brian McIver	Mark Lynch	1993	1998
Donegal	Gold and green	Donegal Creameries	Jim McGuinness	Michael Murphy	2012	2012
Down	Red and black	Canal Court Hotel	James McCartan	Mark Poland	1994	1994
Fermanagh	Green and white	Tracey Concrete	Pete McGrath	Eoin Donnelly
Monaghan	White and blue	Investec	Malachy O'Rourke	Conor McManus		2013
Tyrone	White and Red	Hunky Dorys	Mickey Harte	Seán Cavanagh	2008	2010

== Bracket ==
Preliminary round
Tyrone (R)	2-11; 3-11
Down (R)	3-08; 0-12

Quarter-finals
Tyrone	0-14
Monaghan	1-12
Armagh	1-12
Cavan	0-09
Fermanagh	3-13
Antrim	2-18
Derry	0-11
Donegal	1-11

Semi-finals
Monaghan (R)	0-14; 1-18
Armagh (R)	0-14; 1-13
Antrim	0-12
Donegal	3-16

Final
Monaghan	1-09
Donegal	0-15

== Fixtures ==
=== Preliminary round ===
18 May 2014
4.00pm
Preliminary Round

Tyrone	2-11 – 3-08	Down
D McCurry (1-02), S Cavanagh (0-05), P Harte (1-00), K Coney (0-03), N Morgan (0-01)	Report	D O’Hare (1-02), C Maginn (1-00), A Carr (1-00), C Garvey, M Poland, C Laverty, A Rogers, N Madine, B Coulter (0-01 each)

Healy Park, Omagh
Attendance: 13,222
Referee: David Coldrick (Meath)

24 May 2014
6.30pm
Preliminary Round Replay

Down	0-12 – 3-11	Tyrone
D O'Hare (0-06), C Laverty (0-02), D Gordon, C Maginn, B Coulter, C Garvey (0-01 each)	Report	C McGinley (2-01), P Harte (1-01), N Morgan (0-03), D McCurry (0-02), M Donnelly, R O'Neill, N McKenna, C McAliskey (0-01 each)

Páirc Esler, Newry
Attendance: 18,000
Referee: Cormac Reilly (Meath)

=== Quarter-finals ===
25 May 2014
2.00pm
Quarter Final

Derry	0-11 – 1-11	Donegal
M Lynch (0-04), E Bradley (0-03), B Heron (0-02), C McFaul, N Holly (0-01 each)	Report	L McLoone (1-01), M Murphy (0-04), K Lacey, A Thompson, C Toye, D O'Connor, P McBrearty, M McElhinney (0-01 each)

Celtic Park, Derry
Attendance: 15,883
Referee: Joe McQuillan (Cavan)

1 June 2014
3.30pm
Quarter Final

Fermanagh	3-13 – 2-18	Antrim
S Quigley (1-06), M O'Brien (1-01), B Owens (1-00), P McCusker (0-03), E Donnelly, A Ward, E Maguire (0-01 each)	Report	B Neeson (1-06), K Niblock (1-03), T McCann (0-03), P McCann (0-02), M McCann (0-02), R Murray (0-02)

Brewster Park, Enniskillen
Attendance: 8,256
Referee: C. Branagan (Down)

8 June 2014
4.00pm
Quarter Final

Armagh	1-12 – 0-09	Cavan
J Clarke (0-04), C Rafferty (1-00), A Kernan (0-03), E McVerry, E Rafferty (0-02 each), M Shields (0-01)	Report	E Keating, G McKiernan, David Givney (0-02 each), F Flanagan, C Mackey, M McKeever (0-01 each)

Athletic Grounds, Armagh
Referee: Marty Duffy (Sligo)

15 June 2014
2.00pm
Quarter Final

Monaghan	1-12 – 0-14	Tyrone
C McManus (0-06), D Malone (1-00), K Hughes, F Kelly, R Beggan (0-02 each)	Report	D McCurry (0-04), Mattie Donnelly (0-03), S Cavanagh, N Morgan, C McAliskey (0-02 each), C McGinley (0-01)

St Tiernach's Park, Clones
Referee: Eddie Kinsella (Laois)

=== Semi-finals ===
22 June 2014
2.00pm
Semi Final

Donegal	3-16 – 0-12	Antrim
D O’Connor, L McLoone (1-02 each), D Molloy (1-01), O MacNialais (0-04), M Murphy (0-03), C Toye, C McFadden (0-02 each)	Report	T McCann, B Neeson (0-03 each), M Sweeney (0-02), C Murray, P McCann, K Niblock, P Cunningham (0-01 each)

St Tiernach's Park
Attendance: 11,795
Referee: B Cassidy (Derry)

28 June 2014
7.00pm
Semi Final

Armagh	0-14 – 0-14	Monaghan
S Campbell, J Clarke, T Kernan (0-03 each), M Shields, K Dyas, A Forker, S Forker, R Grugan (0-01 each)	Report	R Beggan (0-05), K Hughes, C McManus, S Gollogly (0-02 each), D Clerkin, C McGuinness, J McCarron (0-01 each)

St Tiernach's Park
Referee: Joe McQuillan (Cavan)

6 July 2014
3.30pm
Semi Final Replay

Monaghan	1-18 – 1-13	Armagh
C McManus (1-07), P Finlay (0-04), D Hughes, R Beggan (0-02 each), D Clerkin, S Gollogly, D Malone (0-01 each)	Report	T Kernan (0-07), J Clarke (0-05), A Findon (1-00), E McVerry (0-01)

St Tiernach's Park
Referee: M Duffy (Sligo)

=== Final ===
20 July 2014
4.00pm
Final

Monaghan	1-09 – 0-15	Donegal
P Finlay (0-04), C McGuinness (1-00), R Beggan (0-02), V Corey, K Hughes, C McManus (0-01 each)	Report	C McFadden (0-04), P McBrearty, O MacNiallais (0-03 each), M Murphy (0-02), A Thompson, K Lacey, R McHugh (0-01 each)

St Tiernach's Park, Clones
Referee: Maurice Deegan (Laois)

== See also ==
- Fixtures and results
- 2014 All-Ireland Senior Football Championship
  - 2014 Connacht Senior Football Championship
  - 2014 Leinster Senior Football Championship
  - 2014 Munster Senior Football Championship
