= 2026 Donegal county football team season =

Donegal county football team
2026 season
- Manager: Jim McGuinness

The following is a summary of Donegal county football team's 2026 season.

== Personnel changes ==
On 3 December 2025, Caolan Ward announced his retirement from inter-county football.

Patrick McBrearty, the captain, was then forced to retire because of injury, with that announcement coming on 15 December 2025.

Following the conclusion of the 2025 County SFC, Peter Campbell from the Donegal Democrat wrote that Jim McGuinness, the Donegal manager, "will surely have made an approach" to Kieran Gallagher of Naomh Conaill. Naomh Conaill player Ciarán Thompson, speaking at the launch of the 2026 Dr McKenna Cup, confirmed that "Shea Malone, Kieran Gallagher, Ultan Doherty and Max Campbell (from Naomh Conaill) are new to the panel this year".

MacCumhaill Park in Ballybofey is unavailable due to its facilities being upgraded.

== Kit ==
In December 2025, a new retro style jersey for the team to wear in 2026 was launched.

== Competitions ==
=== Dr McKenna Cup ===
The Dr McKenna Cup is to return on 2 January after an absence of one year. The draw was held on 2 December 2025, with Donegal placed in Section C, to compete in Rounds 1 and 3. The team's opening game, a home fixture against Derry, is scheduled for 4 January.

4 January 2026 Round 1	Donegal	v	Derry	Letterkenny
13:30 IST				Stadium: O'Donnell Park

11 January 2026 Round 3	Antrim	v	Donegal	Cargin
13:30 IST

=== National Football League ===
Donegal's fixtures for the 2026 NFL were announced in early December 2025.

24 January 2026 Round 1	Dublin	v	Donegal	Dublin
17:00 IST				Stadium: Croke Park

1 February 2026 Round 2	Donegal	v	Kerry	Ballyshannon
13:30 IST				Stadium: Fr Tierney Park

15 February 2026 Round 3	Donegal	v	Mayo	Letterkenny
13:45 IST				Stadium: O'Donnell Park

22 February 2026 Round 4	Armagh	v	Donegal	Armagh
15:45 IST				Stadium: Athletic Grounds

1 March 2026 Round 5	Donegal	v	Galway	Ballyshannon
13:15 IST				Stadium: Fr Tierney Park

15 March 2026 Round 6	Roscommon	v	Donegal	Roscommon
13:30 IST				Stadium: Dr Hyde Park

22 March 2026 Round 7	Monaghan	v	Donegal	Clones
15:30 IST				Stadium: St Tiernach's Park

Pos	Team	Pld	W	D	L	PF	PA	PD	Pts	Qualification
1	arm	0	0	0	0	0	0	0	0	Advance to NFL Final
2	Don	0	0	0	0	0	0	0	0	Advance to NFL Final
3	May	0	0	0	0	0	0	0	0	
4	Ker	0	0	0	0	0	0	0	0	
5	ros	0	0	0	0	0	0	0	0	
6	gal	0	0	0	0	0	0	0	0	
7	Dublin	2	0	0	2	35	44	−9	0	Relegation to 2027 NFL Division 2
8	Monaghan	2	0	0	2	37	55	−18	0	Relegation to 2027 NFL Division 2

First match(es) will be played: January 2026. Source: GAA.ie
Rules for classification: Tiebreakers

=== Ulster Senior Football Championship ===
The draw for the 2026 Ulster SFC took place on 27 November 2025. Ciarán Thompson, out injured after tearing his ACL while playing for Donegal in the 2025 All-Ireland SFC final, drew the names. Donegal and Down were paired together in a quarter-final, with the winner of that game set to meet one of Armagh, Fermanagh or Tyrone in a semi-final.

26 April 2026
Quarter-final

Donegal	v	Down

MacCumhaill Park, Ballybofey

Preliminary round

Quarter-finals

Semi-finals

Final

Derry

Antrim

Quarter-final winner

Quarter-final winner

Monaghan

Cavan

Semi-final winner

Semi-final winner

Donegal

Down

Quarter-final winner

Armagh

Quarter-final winner

Tyrone

Fermanagh

Preliminary winner
