= Noel McCole =

Gaelic footballer

Noel McCole is a Gaelic footballer who played with Donegal. He won Ulster Finals in 1974 and 1983.
