= Brendan Dunleavy =

Gaelic footballer

Brendan Dunleavy is a Gaelic footballer who played with Donegal. He won four Sigerson Cups during the 1970s. He won an All Ireland Club Title in 1975. He was 1985 Donegal Player of the Year.
