= Joe McQuillan =

Irish Gaelic football referee (born 1975)

Joe McQuillan (born 1975) is a Gaelic football referee. He is a member of the Kill Shamrocks club in County Cavan.

McQuillan refereed four All-Ireland SFC finals: the 2011 decider between Dublin and Kerry, the 2013 decider between Dublin and Mayo, the 2017 decider between Dublin and Mayo and the 2021 decider between Mayo and Tyrone.

He was the third Cavanman to referee an All-Ireland final, following Fintan Tierney of Butlersbridge (1972) and Brian Crowe of Cavan Gaels (2006). Tierney, though, was originally from Longford.

McQuillan was in charge during the game that produced the infamous "spitgate" incident in the 2013 National Football League – when Donegal's reigning national footballer of the year Karl Lacey, who was injured that day, was hit by some spit from the mouth of a Tyrone fan. McQuillan later refereed the highly anticipated opening Ulster Championship clash between All-Ireland holders Donegal and Tyrone, winners in 2003, 2005 and 2008.

Among the other important football matches he refereed were the 2011 Ulster final, two Leinster finals, a Munster final and club and U21 All-Ireland finals.

In 2022, Martin Breheny named him among "five of the best football referees".

McQuillan took charge of the 2025 All-Ireland SFC semi-final between Kerry and Tyrone, the last inter-county fixture he was eligible for.
