= 2012 Ulster Senior Football Championship =

2012 Ulster SFC
Tournament details
- Year: 2012

Winners
- Champions: Donegal (8th win)
- Manager: Jim McGuinness
- Captain: Michael Murphy

Runners-up
- Runners-up: Down
- Manager: James McCartan Jnr

Championship venues

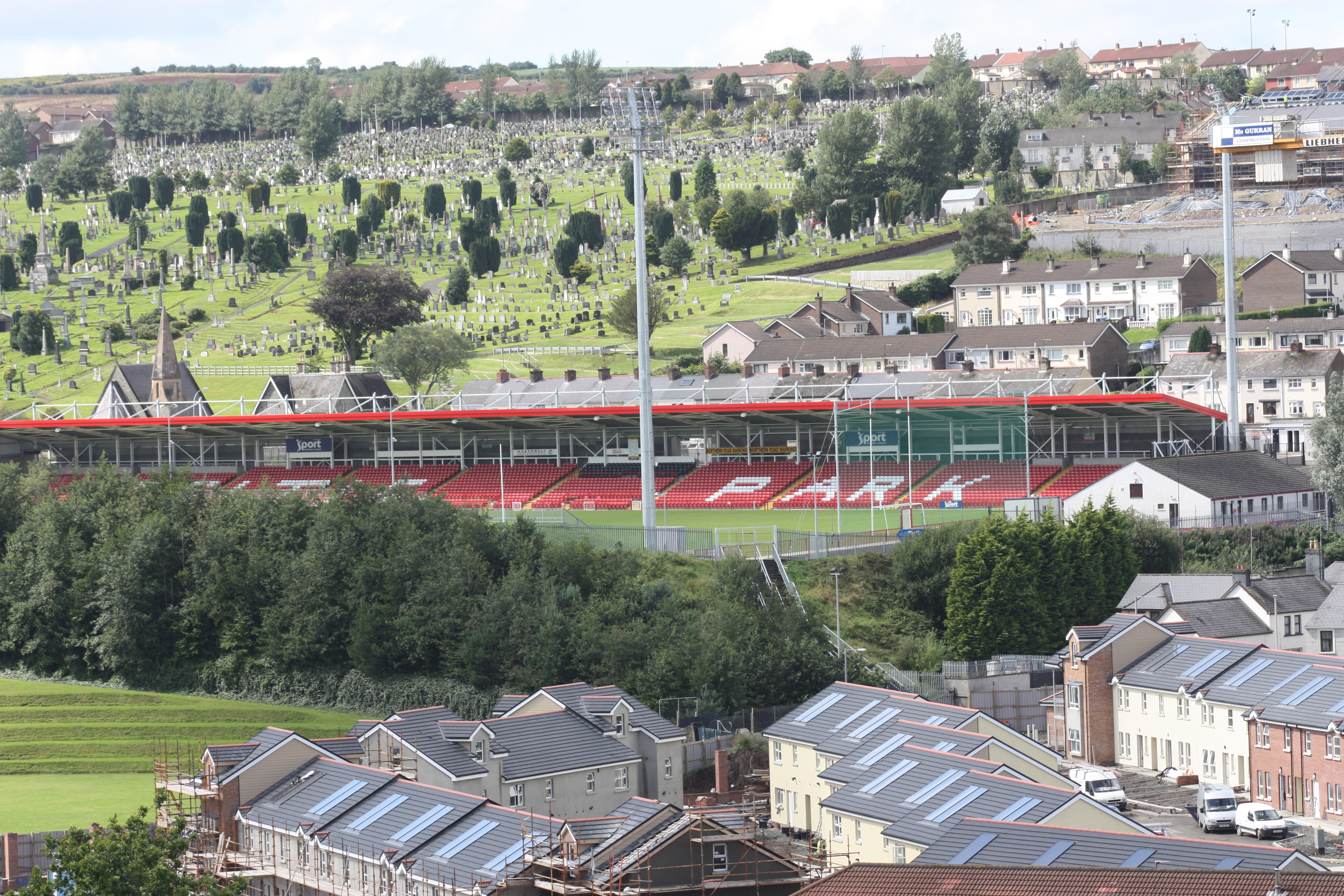
Celtic Park in the City of Derry

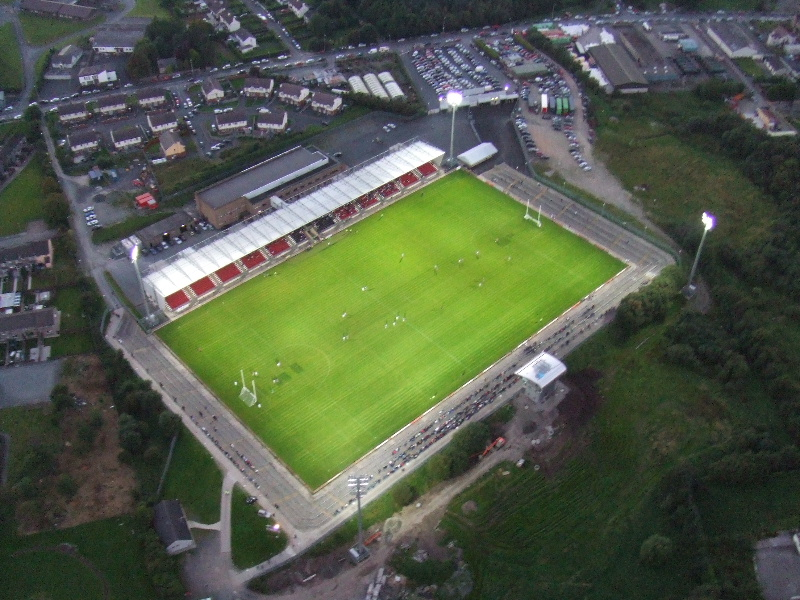
Healy Park in Omagh

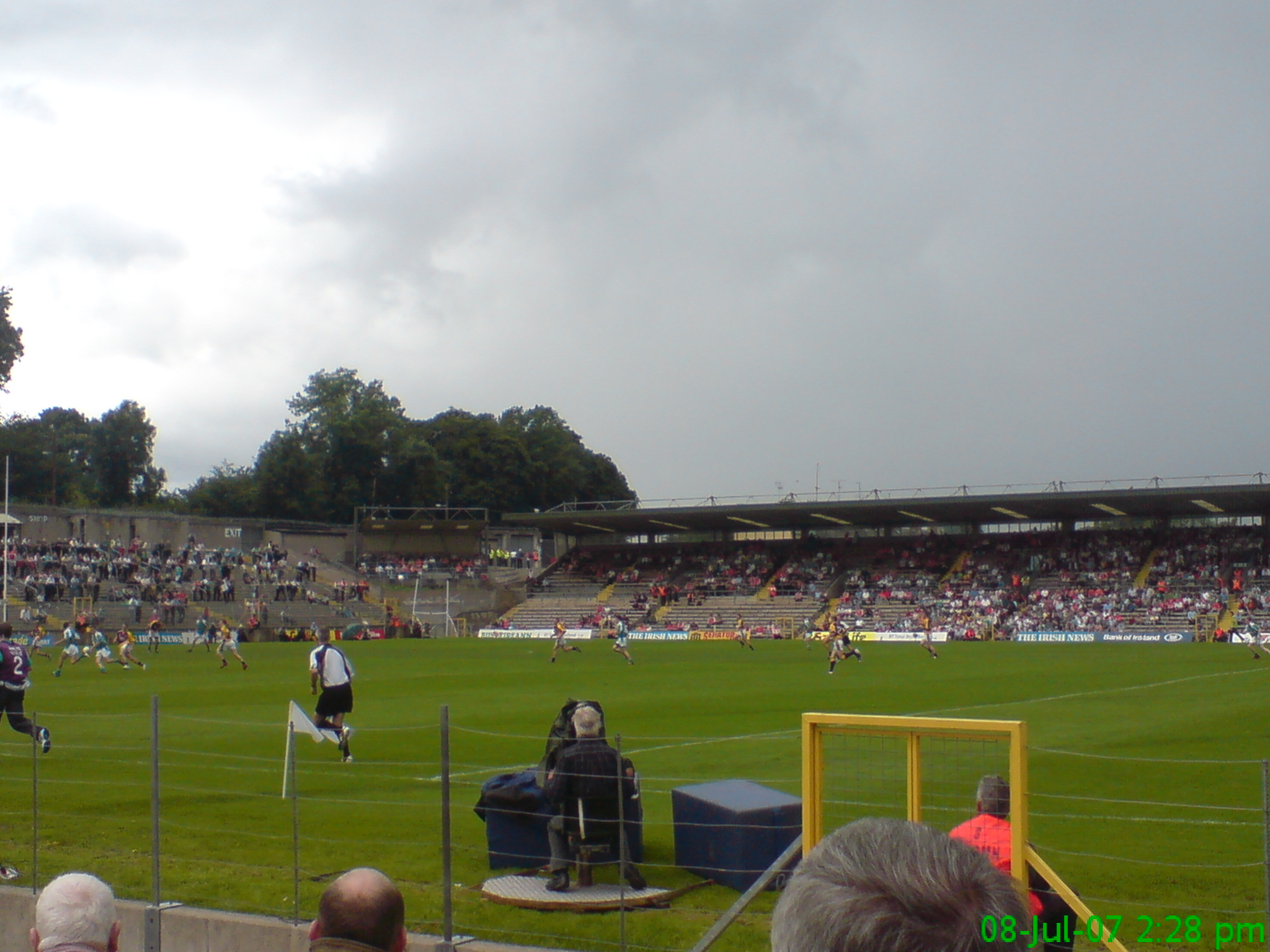
St Tiernach's Park in Clones

and others elsewhere...

The 2012 Ulster Senior Football Championship was the 124th installment of the annual Ulster Senior Football Championship held under the auspices of the Ulster GAA. It was won by Donegal who defeated Down in the final to retain the title they won the previous year. The winning Donegal team received the Anglo-Celt Cup, and automatically advanced to the quarter-final stage of the 2012 All-Ireland Senior Football Championship. They progressed from there to the semi-final then on to the 2012 All-Ireland Senior Football Championship Final where they claimed the Sam Maguire Cup.

== Bracket ==
Preliminary round
Cavan	1-10
Donegal	1-16

Quarter-finals
Donegal	2-13
Derry	0-09
Tyrone	0-19
Armagh	1-13
Monaghan	1-12
Antrim	1-09
Down	2-10
Fermanagh	1-08

Semi-finals
Donegal	0-12
Tyrone	0-10
Monaghan	1-13
Down	1-14

Final
Donegal	2-18
Down	0-13

== Preliminary round ==
20 May 2012
3:30pm
Preliminary Round

Cavan	1-10 - 1-16	Donegal
N McDermott 1-1 (1-0 pen, 0-1f), E Keating 0-5, D Givney 0-2, G McKiernan, J Brady 0-1 each	Report	C McFadden 1-6 (1-0 pen, 0-5f), R Kavanagh 0-3, M McHugh, L McLoone 0-2 each, N McGee, F McGlynn, N Gallagher 0-1 each

Breffni Park, Cavan
Attendance: 12,847
Referee: C Reilly (Meath)

== Quarter-finals ==
27 May 2012
3:30pm
Quarter Final

Monaghan	1-12 - 1-9	Antrim
K O'Connell 1-0, C McManus (2f), T Freeman, K Hughes (1f), D Clerkin 0-2 each, P Finlay (1f), O Lennon, D Mone, P Dooney 0-1 each	Report	P Cunningham 0-4 (2f), J Loughrey 1-0, M McCann 0-2, A Gallagher, M Magill, M McAleese 0-1 each

St Tiernach's Park, Clones
Attendance: 8,804
Referee: Maurice Deegan (Laois)
3 June 2012
3:30pm
Quarter Final

Fermanagh	1-8 - 2-10	Down
D. Kelly 1-1, D. Kille 0-3 (2f), S. Quigley 0-2 (2f), T. Corrigan, P. Ward 0-1 each.	Report	D O'Hare 1-1, C Laverty 1-0, C Maginn, A Carr (f), A Rogers, K King, K McKernan, D McCartan, B McArdle, D O'Hagan, K Duffin 0-1 each.

Brewster Park, Enniskillen
Attendance: 12,435
Referee: S Doyle Wexford
10 June 2012
4:00pm
Quarter Final

Armagh	1-13 - 0-19	Tyrone
J Clarke 0-5 (1f), A Forker 1-1 (1f), B Mallon 0-4 (4f), G McParland 0-2, K Dyas 0-1	Report	M Penrose 0-8 (5f), Stephen O'Neill, O Mulligan (1f), C Cavanagh, P Harte all 0-2 each, M Donnelly, Joe McMahon, D Carlin all 0-1 each

Athletic Grounds, Armagh
Attendance: 16,418
Referee: Joe McQuillan (Cavan)
16 June 2012
5:00pm
Quarter Final

Donegal	2-13 - 0-9	Derry
C McFadden L McLoone 1-0, M Murphy 0-3 (3f), P McBrearty, D Walsh 0-2 each, R Bradley, N Gallagher, A Thompson, F McGlynn 0-1 each.	Report	P Bradley 0-6 (5f), M Lynch, SL McGoldrick, E Bradley ('45) 0-1 each.

MacCumhaill Park, Ballybofey
Attendance: 11,207
Referee: M Duffy (Sligo)

== Semi-finals ==
24 June 2012
2:00pm
Semi Final

Monaghan	1-13 - 1-14	Down
P Finlay (3f), C McManus (3f) 0-5 each, T Freeman 1-0, D Hughes 0-2 (1f, 1 45), D Clerkin 0-1	Report	D O'Hare 0-5 (5f), A Carr 1-2, (1-0 pen, 1f), C Laverty 0-2, A Rogers (f), D O'Hagan, K Duffin, L Doyle (f), B Coulter 0-1 each

Athletic Grounds, Armagh
Attendance: 11,149
Referee: M Duffy (Sligo)
30 June 2012
4:30pm
Semi Final

Tyrone	0-10 - 0-12	Donegal
Stephen O'Neill, J McMahon (2f) 0-2 each, C Clarke, C Gormley (45), D Carlin, Sean O’Neill; Mark Donnelly, M Penrose 0-1 each	Report	M Murphy (3f), C McFadden (2f) 0-3 each, R Kavanagh 0-2, R Bradley, K Lacey, P McBrearty, M McHugh 0-1 each

St Tiernach's Park, Clones
Attendance: 17,730
Referee: David Coldrick (Meath)

== Final ==
22 July 2012
2:00pm
Final

Down	0-13 - 2-18	Donegal
L Doyle (2f) 0-4, D O'Hare (1f) 0-2, C Laverty, A Rogers, K McKernan, A Brannigan, C Maginn, D Hughes, E McCartan 0-1 each	Report	L McLoone, F McGlynn 1-0 each, C McFadden (3f) 0-6, Declan Walsh, R Bradley, M McHugh, M McElhinney 0-2 each, David Walsh, D McLaughlin, P McBrearty, M Murphy 0-1 each

St Tiernach's Park, Clones
Attendance: 34,696
Referee: Joe McQuillan (Cavan)
