= 2011 Ulster Senior Football Championship =

Championship venues

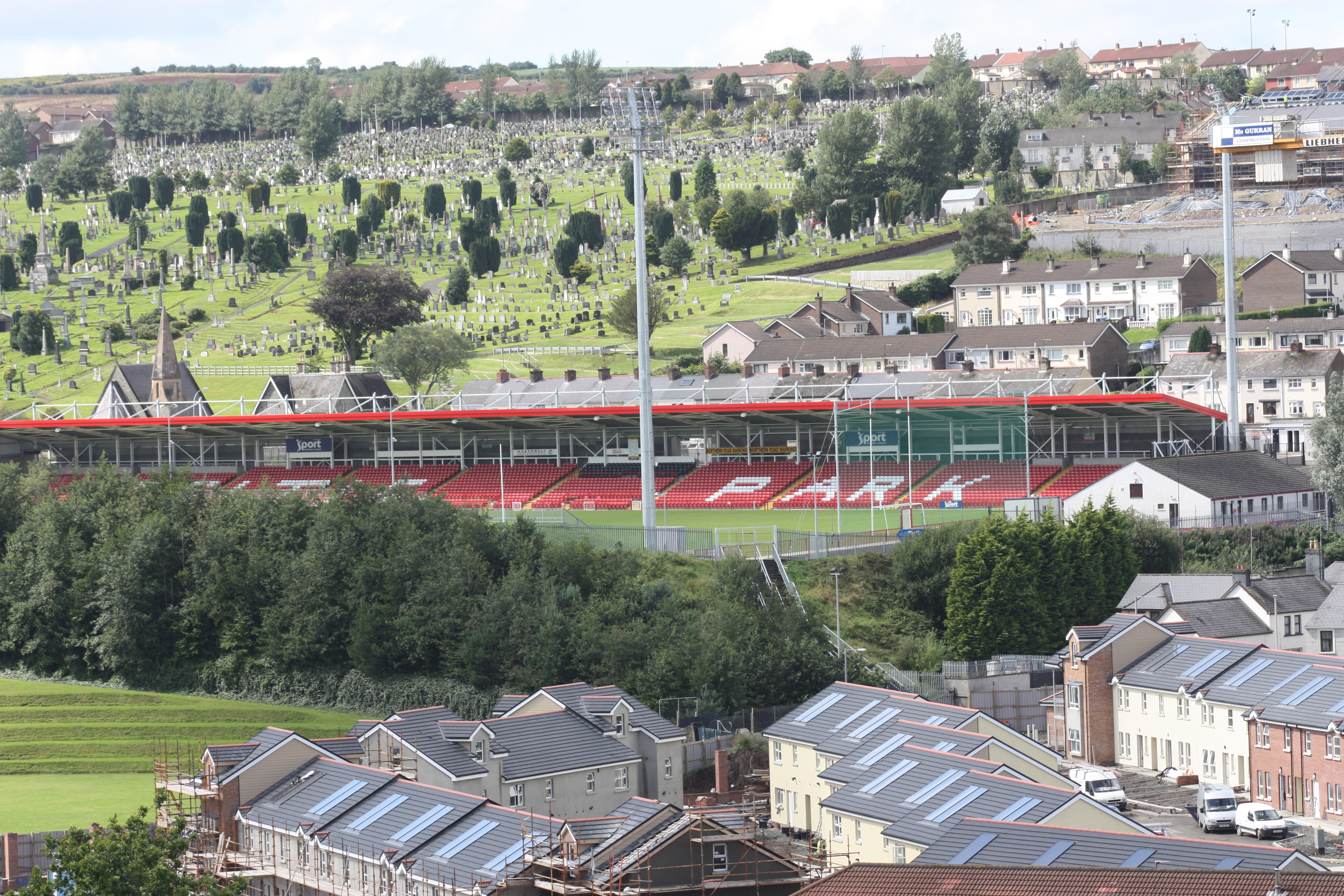
Celtic Park in the City of Derry

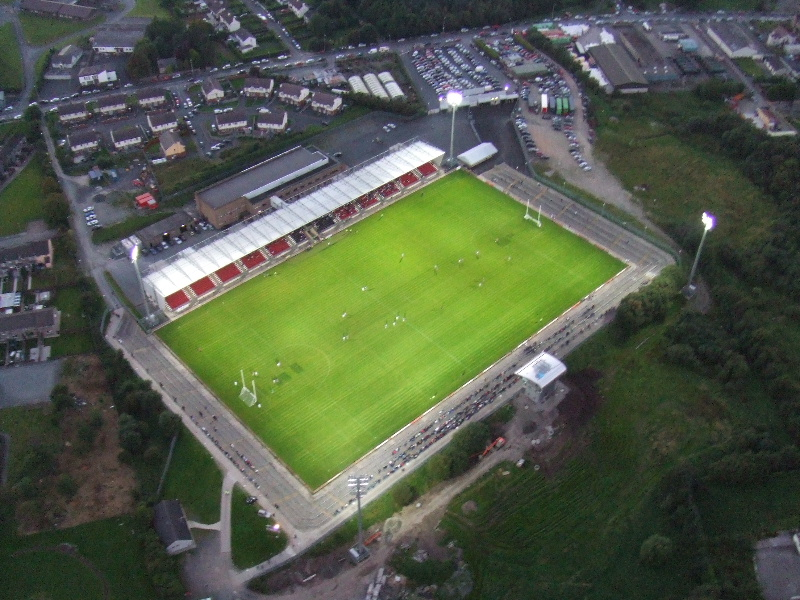
Healy Park in Omagh

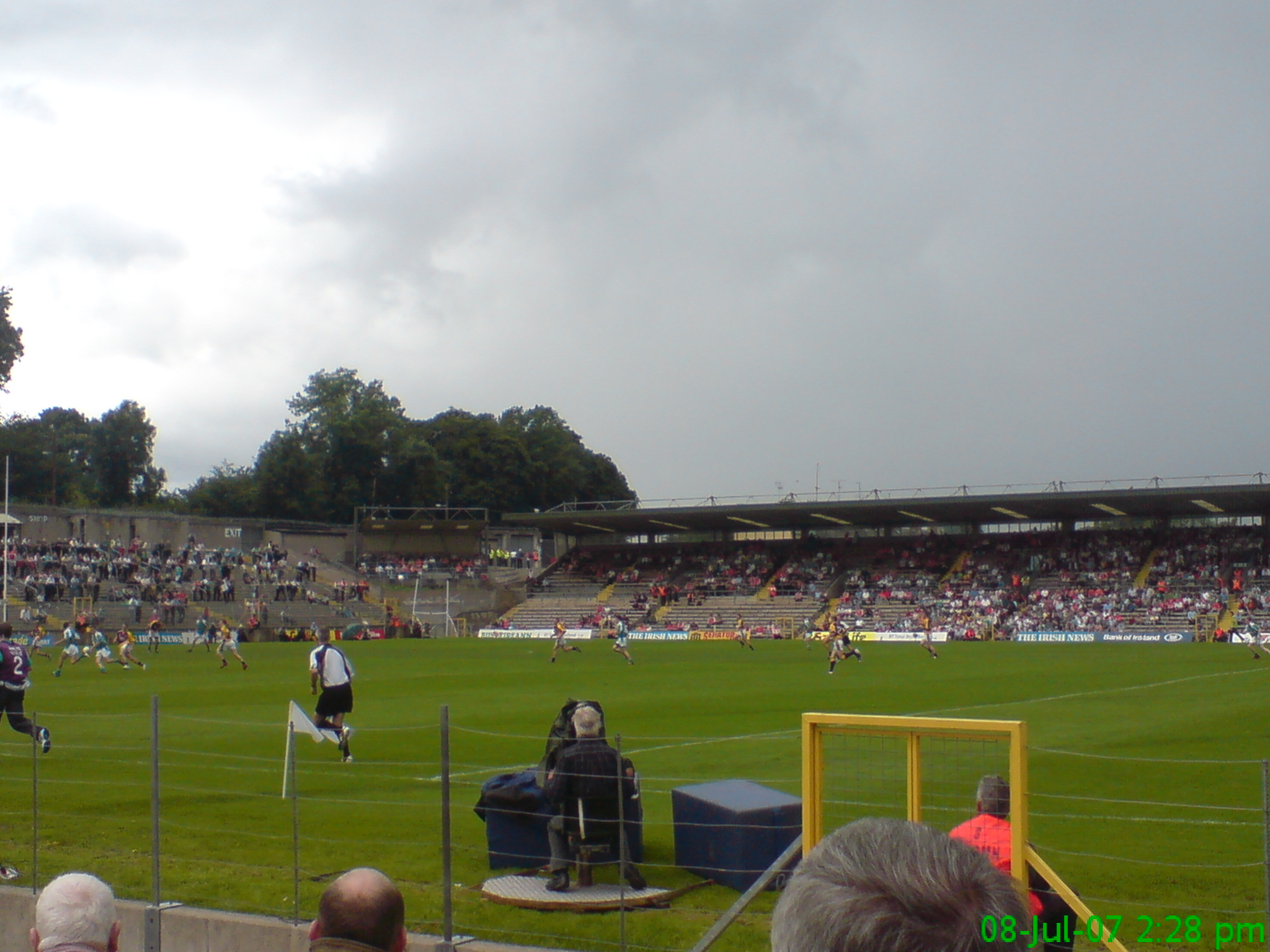
St Tiernach's Park in Clones

and others elsewhere...

The 2011 Ulster Senior Football Championship was the 123rd installment of the annual Ulster Senior Football Championship held under the auspices of the Ulster GAA. It was won by Donegal who defeated Derry in the final. It was their first Ulster title since 1992. The winning Donegal team received the Anglo-Celt Cup, and automatically advanced to the quarter-final stage of the 2011 All-Ireland Senior Football Championship.

Donegal's semi-final defeat of Tyrone and Derry's semi-final defeat of Armagh brought about the end of a period of dominance by these two counties. Armagh and Tyrone had shared the previous eleven Ulster senior titles between them in a run stretching back to 1999. It also brought the first trophy for Jim McGuinness's famed Donegal team, who would go on to consign the decade-long dominance of those two counties to history.

== Bracket ==
Preliminary round
Donegal	1-10
Antrim	0-7

Quarter-finals
Derry	1-18
Fermanagh	1-10
Armagh	1-15
Down	1-10
Tyrone	1-13
Monaghan	1-11
Cavan	1-8
Donegal	2-14

Semi-finals
Derry	3-14
Armagh	1-11
Tyrone	0-9
Donegal	2-6

Final
Derry	0-08
Donegal	1-11

== Preliminary round ==
15 May 2011
3:30pm
Preliminary Round

Donegal	1-10 - 0-7	Antrim
M McHugh 1-1, M Murphy 0-3 (3f), R Bradley, C McFadden (1f) 0-2 each, D Molloy, A Hanlon 0-1 each	Report	T McCann, P Cunningham (1f), K Niblock (2f) 0-2 each, M Dougan 0-1

MacCumhaill Park, Ballybofey
Attendance: 7,385
Referee: Maurice Deegan (Laois)

== Quarter-finals ==
22 May 2011
3:30pm
Quarter Final

Derry	1-18 - 1-10	Fermanagh
E Bradley 1-4, C Gilligan 0-3, E. Muldoon, J Diver, M Bateson, G O'Kane 0-2 each, M Lynch, SL McGoldrick, C Kielt 0-1 each	Report	D Kille 0-5 (3f, 1 '45), J Woods 1-0, R Jones 0-2, T Flanagan, C O'Brien, B Mulrone 0-1 each.

Celtic Park, Derry
Attendance: 5,646
Referee: Joe McQuillan (Cavan)
28 May 2011
7:30pm
Quarter Final

Armagh	1-15 - 1-10	Down
J Clarke 1-2, A Kernan 0-5 (3f), BJ Padden 0-3, M Mackin 0-2, K Dyas, T Kernan S McDonnell (f) 0-1 each	Report	M Clarke 0-5 (4f), M Poland 1-1, P McComiskey 0-2, D Rooney, D Hughes 0-1 each.

Athletic Grounds, Armagh
Attendance: 13,107
Referee: C Reilly (Meath)
5 June 2011
3:30pm
Quarter Final

Tyrone	1-13 - 1-11	Monaghan
B McGuigan 1-1, S Cavanagh 0-4 (0-2f), S O'Neill 0-3, M Penrose (2f), P Harte (1f, 1 '45) 0-2 each, O Mulligan 0-1	Report	C McManus 0-6 (5f), D Hughes 1-1 (1-0 pen), P Finlay 0-4 (3f).

Healy Park, Omagh
Attendance: 10,937
Referee: Joe McQuillan (Cavan)
12 June 2011
3:30pm
Quarter Final

Donegal	2-14 - 1-8	Cavan
P McBrearty 1-3 (1f), C McFadden 0-5 (2f), R Kavanagh 1-0, D Molloy 0-2, K Cassidy, K Rafferty, L McLoone and M Murphy 0-1(f) each	Report	M Brennan 1-1, N McDermott 0-4 (3f), G McKiernan, F Flanagan and S Johnston 0-1 (f) each.

Breffni Park, Cavan
Attendance: 9,325
Referee: M Duffy (Sligo)

== Semi-finals ==
19 June 2011
2:00pm
Semi Final

Derry	3-14 - 1-11	Armagh
E Bradley (0-2f), C Gilligan (0-5f) 1-5 each, M Lynch 1-2, SL McGoldrick, C Kielt 0-1 each	Report	S McDonnell (3f, 1 '45) 0-6, M O'Rourke 1-1, J Clarke, P Duffy, A Kernan, C Vernon 0-1 each

St Tiernach's Park, Clones
Attendance: 14,941
Referee: David Coldrick (Meath)
26 June 2011
3:30pm
Semi Final

Tyrone	0-9 - 2-6	Donegal
S O'Neill 0-2, S Cavanagh 0-2 (1f), P Jordan, B Dooher, O Mulligan, M Penrose and P Harte (f) 0-1 each	Report	C McFadden 1-1 (1f), D Molloy 1-0, M Murphy 0-2 (1f), K Cassidy, K Rafferty and P McBrearty 0-1 each

St Tiernach's Park, Clones
Attendance: 18,536
Referee: Joe McQuillan (Cavan)

== Final ==
17 July 2011
4:00pm
Final

Derry	0-08 - 1-11	Donegal
J Kielt 0-04 (2f), C Kielt 0-02, C Gilligan (f), M Donaghy 0-01 each	Report	M Murphy 1-02 (1-00 pen), C McFadden 0-04 (2f), M Hegarty, A Thompson 0-02 each, R Bradley 0-01

St Tiernach's Park, Clones
Attendance: 28,364
Referee: Maurice Deegan (Laois)
