= Aurivo Co-operative Society Limited =

Irish agricultural cooperative

- Company type: Co-operative
- Predecessors: Shannonside; NCF Co-operative; Kiltoghert; Donegal Creameries
- Founded: 2000
- Headquarters: Sligo, Ireland
- Area served: Connacht; Ulster
- Products: Milk; Butter; Dairy Ingredients
- Brands: Connacht Gold; Donegal Creameries; For Goodness Shakes; Homeland
- Services: Agribusiness; Consumer Foods; Dairy Ingredients
- Revenue: €570,290,000
- Total assets: €111,624,000
- Total equity: €81,456,000
- Members: 10,000
- Number of employees: 650
- Website: https://www.aurivo.ie

Aurivo Co-operative Society Limited is an Irish agricultural cooperative based in Sligo, County Sligo, Ireland. With its catchment area mostly in the North West, Aurivo processes an annual volume of approximately 500 million litres of milk, making it one of Ireland's largest dairy co-operatives. Formed after the 2000 merger of North Connacht Farmers Co-operative (itself an earlier amalgamation of smaller creameries in the North West) and Kiltoghert Co-operative Agricultural & Dairy Society, by 2021 it had over 10,000 farmers members and reported an operating profit of €12.6 million from a turnover of €570.2 million.

With approximately 650 employees, Aurivo is divided into a number of key business areas including: Consumer Foods (Milk and Butter), Dairy Ingredients (milk powders and cheese), Agribusiness (servicing local farmers), and its retail network of shops across the North West.
