= 2012 Donegal county football team season =

Donegal county football team
2012 season
- Manager: Jim McGuinness
- Stadium: MacCumhaill Park, Ballybofey
- All-Ireland SFC: Winners
- Ulster SFC: Winners

The following is a summary of Donegal county football team's 2012 season. It was the franchise's 108th season since the County Board's foundation in 1905. The team ended the season as All-Ireland champions after winning Sam Maguire MMXII.

Jim McGuinness returned for his second season as the team's manager. Pioneer of the game's revolutionary tactic The System, he entered the season having won the 2011 Ulster Senior Football Championship in his first season at the helm. Consecutive Ulster titles were a possibility, a first in team history, and the 2012 Ulster Senior Football Championship duly followed. McGuinness then became only the second manager, after Brian McEniff at the helm of the fabled Sam MCMXCII side, to lead Donegal to the All-Ireland title.

== Panel ==
↑ Team as per Donegal v Mayo in the 2012 All-Ireland Senior Football Championship Final on 23 September 2012

No.	Player	Position	Club
1	Paul Durcan	Goalkeeper	The Four Masters
2	Paddy McGrath	Right corner back	Ard an Rátha
3	Neil McGee	Full back	Gaoth Dobhair
4	Frank McGlynn	Left corner back	Glenfin
5	Eamon McGee	Right half back	Gaoth Dobhair
6	Karl Lacey	Centre back	The Four Masters
7	Anthony Thompson	Left half back	Naomh Conaill
8	Neil Gallagher	Midfield	Glenswilly
9	Rory Kavanagh	Midfield	St Eunan's
10	Ryan Bradley	Right half forward	Buncrana
11	Leo McLoone	Centre forward	Naomh Conaill
12	Mark McHugh	Left half forward	Cill Chartha
13	Patrick McBrearty	Right corner forward	Cill Chartha
14	Michael Murphy (c)	Full forward	Glenswilly
15	Colm McFadden	Left corner forward	St Michael's

No.	Player	Position	Club
16	Michael Boyle	Substitute	Termon
17	Martin McElhinney	Substitute	St Michael's
18	Marty Boyle	Substitute	Naomh Conaill
19	David Walsh	Substitute	Naomh Bríd
20	Christy Toye	Substitute	St Michael's
21	Stephen Griffin	Substitute	St Naul's
22	Daniel McLaughlin	Substitute	St Michael's
23	Martin O'Reilly	Substitute	Seán MacCumhaill's
24	Dermot Molloy	Substitute	Naomh Conaill
25	Declan Walsh	Substitute	Malin
26	Adrian Hanlon	Substitute	An Clochán Liath

No.	Player	Position	Club
	Antoin McFadden	Panelist	St Michael's
	Gary McFadden	Panelist	Glenswilly
	Peter McGee	Panelist	Gaoth Dobhair
	Tommy McKinley	Panelist	Naomh Colmcille
	Kevin Rafferty	Panelist	St Eunan's
	Peter Witherow	Panelist	St Michael's

== Competitions ==
=== Dr McKenna Cup ===
Conor McManus from Cork was part of the panel after transferring to Cill Chartha due to work commitments and being called into McGuinness's panel. He made his Donegal debut against UUJ at O'Donnell Park on 8 January, playing in midfield beside Neil Gallagher. He was half-time substitute against Cavan at Breffni Park on 15 January. His third and final appearance for the county came as a corner-forward against Derry at MacCumhaill Park on 18 January. McManus did not participate in Donegal's league campaign as by then his work brought him to Limerick, allowing him to return to his native club Clonakilty.

=== Ulster Senior Football Championship ===
20 May 2012
3:30pm
Preliminary round

Cavan	1-10 - 1-16	Donegal
N McDermott 1-1 (1-0 pen, 0-1f), E Keating 0-5, D Givney 0-2, G McKiernan, J Brady 0-1 each	Report	C McFadden 1-6 (1-0 pen, 0-5f), R Kavanagh 0-3, M McHugh, L McLoone 0-2 each, N McGee, F McGlynn, N Gallagher 0-1 each

Breffni Park, Cavan
Attendance: 12,847
Referee: Cormac Reilly (Meath)
16 June 2012
5:00pm
Quarter-final

Donegal	2-13 - 0-9	Derry
C McFadden L McLoone 1-0, M Murphy 0-3 (3f), P McBrearty, D Walsh 0-2 each, R Bradley, N Gallagher, A Thompson, F McGlynn 0-1 each.	Report	P Bradley 0-6 (5f), M Lynch, SL McGoldrick, E Bradley (’45) 0-1 each.

MacCumhaill Park, Ballybofey
Attendance: 11,207
Referee: Marty Duffy (Sligo)
30 June 2012
4:30pm
Semi-final

Tyrone	0-10 - 0-12	Donegal
Stephen O'Neill, J McMahon (2f) 0-2 each, C Clarke, C Gormley (45), D Carlin, Sean O'Neill; Mark Donnelly, M Penrose 0-1 each	Report	M Murphy (3f), C McFadden (2f) 0-3 each, R Kavanagh 0-2, R Bradley, K Lacey, P McBrearty, M McHugh 0-1 each

St Tiernach's Park, Clones
Attendance: 17, 730
Referee: David Coldrick (Meath)
22 July 2012
2:00pm
Final

Down	0-13 - 2-18	Donegal
L Doyle (2f) 0-4, D O'Hare (1f) 0-2, C Laverty, A Rogers, K McKernan, A Brannigan, C Maginn, D Hughes, E McCartan 0-1 each	Report	L McLoone, F McGlynn 1-0 each, C McFadden (3f) 0-6, Declan Walsh, R Bradley, M McHugh, M McElhinney 0-2 each, David Walsh, D McLaughlin, P McBrearty, M Murphy 0-1 each

St Tiernach's Park, Clones
Attendance: 34, 696
Referee: Joe McQuillan (Cavan)

=== All-Ireland Senior Football Championship ===
5 August 2012
16:00
Quarter-final

Donegal	1-12 - 1-10	Kerry
C McFadden (1-00sl, 2f) 1-05, M Murphy (2f) 0-03, L McLoone, P McBrearty, C Toye, K Lacey 0-01 each	Report	C Cooper (2f) 0-04, K Donaghy 1-00, A Maher 0-02, B Sheehan (1f), Declan O'Sullivan, J O'Donoghue, P Galvin 0-01 each

Croke Park, Dublin
Referee: Marty Duffy (Sligo)
26 August 2012
15:30
Semi-final

Cork	1-11 - 0-16	Donegal
C O'Neill 1-03, C O'Neill 0-03, P Kerrigan 0-02, D Goulding (f), P Kelly, A Walsh 0-01 each	Report	C McFadden (2f, 1 '45) 0-05, M Murphy (3f) 0-03, K Lacey 0-02, M McHugh, A Thompson, F McGlynn, D Walsh, M McElhinney, R Kavanagh 0-01 each

Croke Park, Dublin
Attendance: 55,169
Referee: David Coldrick (Meath)
23 September 2012
Final

Donegal	2-11 - 0-13	Mayo
M Murphy (3f), C McFadden (3f) 1-04 each, R Bradley, N Gallagher, F McGlynn 0-1 each	Report	C O'Connor (5f) 0-05, E Varley (1f), K McLoughlin 0-02 each, L Keegan, M Conroy, R Feeney, J Gibbons 0-01 each

Croke Park, Dublin
Attendance: 82,269
Referee: Maurice Deegan (Laois)

== Post-season ==
Played under floodlights at Casement Park in Belfast on Saturday 3 November 2012, this game was held in memory of Michaela McAreavey. Donegal, in their first outing as All-Ireland champions, played a team comprising players from the rest of Ulster in an event intended to raise funds for The Michaela Foundation.

== Management team ==
- Manager: Jim McGuinness
- Selectors: Rory Gallagher, Maxi Curran
- Goalkeeping coach: Pat Shovelin
- Strength and conditioning coach: Adam Speer
- Surgical consultant: Kevin Moran
- Team doctor: Charlie McManus
- Team physio: Dermot Simpson
- Physiotherapists: Charlie Molloy, Paul Coyle, Donal Reid, JD.

== Awards ==
=== Donegal News Sports Personality of the Month ===
- Frank McGlynn: June
- Neil Gallagher: August
- Michael Murphy: September

=== The Sunday Game Team of the Year ===
The Sunday Game selected Paul Durcan, Neil McGee, Frank McGlynn, Karl Lacey, Mark McHugh, Neil Gallagher, Colm McFadden and Michael Murphy on its Team of the Year.

=== All Stars ===
Donegal achieved eight All Stars, a record for a single season in team history. Karl Lacey was named All Stars Footballer of the Year.

Pos.	Player	Team	Appearances
GK	Paul Durcan	Donegal	1
RCB	Neil McGee	Donegal	2
FB	Ger Cafferkey	Mayo	1
LCB	Keith Higgins	Mayo	1
RWB	Lee Keegan	Mayo	1
CB	Karl Lacey^{FOTY}	Donegal	4
LWB	Frank McGlynn	Donegal	1
MD	Neil Gallagher	Donegal	1
MD	Aidan Walsh	Cork	2
RWF	Paul Flynn	Dublin	2
CF	Alan Dillon	Mayo	2
LWF	Mark McHugh	Donegal	1
RCF	Colm O'Neill	Cork	1
FF	Michael Murphy	Donegal	1
LCF	Colm McFadden	Donegal	1

County breakdown

- Donegal = 8
- Mayo = 4
- Cork = 2
- Dublin = 1

== See also ==
- "Jimmy's Winning Matches", a song
- Jimmy's Winnin' Matches, a documentary
