= List of Donegal county football team seasons =

The Donegal county football team represents Donegal in men's Gaelic football and is governed by Donegal GAA, the County Board of the Gaelic Athletic Association. The team competes in the three major annual inter-county competitions; the All-Ireland Senior Football Championship, the Ulster Senior Football Championship and the National Football League.

Donegal was the third Ulster county to win an All-Ireland Senior Football Championship (SFC), following Cavan and Down. The team last won the Ulster Senior Championship in 2019, the All-Ireland Senior Championship in 2012 and the National League in 2007.

This list details the team's achievements in major competitions, and the top scorers for each season. Top scorers in bold were also the top scorers in the All-Ireland Championship that season. Records of competitions such as the Dr Lagan Cup and the Dr McKenna Cup are not (yet) included due to them being considered of less importance than the Ulster/All-Ireland Championship and the National League.

== Key ==
Champions
Runners-up
Relegated
Promoted

== Seasons ==
Season	Championship		League						Position		Top scorer	
Season	All-Ireland Series	Provincial Championship	Division	Pld	W	D	L	Pts	Table	Overall	Name	Score
1956	–									–		
1957	–									–		
1958	–									–		
1959	–									–		
1960	–									–		
1961	–									–		
1962	–									–		
1963	–									–		
1964	–									–		
1965	–									–		
1966	–									–		
1967	–									–		
1968	–									–		
1969	–									–		
1970	–									–		
1971	–									–		
1972	All-Ireland Semi-Final	**Ulster Champions**								–		
1973	–									–		
1974	All-Ireland Semi-Final	**Ulster Champions**								–		
1975	–									–		
1976	–									–		
1977	–									–		
1978	–									–		
1979	–									–		
1980	–									–		
1981	–	Ulster Quarter-Final	3	7	3	2	2	8	3rd	–	Martin McHugh	0–37
1982	–	Ulster Quarter-Final	3	7	3	0	4	6	5th	–	Martin McHugh	2–31
1983	All-Ireland Semi-Final	**Ulster Champions**	3	7	3	1	3	7	5th	–	Martin McHugh	0–38
1984	–	Ulster Quarter-Final	3	7	5	0	2	10	2nd	–	Martin McHugh	1–37
1985	–	Ulster Quarter-Final	2	7	2	1	4	5	6th	–	Martin McHugh	4–49
1986	–	Ulster Preliminary Round	2	7	4	1	2	9	3rd	–	Marty Carlin	0–20
1987	–	Ulster Quarter-Final	2	7	3	2	2	8	3rd	–	Martin McHugh	2–23
1988	–	Ulster Quarter-Final	2	7	5	1	1	11	2nd	League Quarter-Final	Martin McHugh	1–35
1989	–	Ulster Final	1	7	3	0	4	6	6th	–	Martin McHugh	3–42
1990	All-Ireland Semi-Final	**Ulster Champions**	1	7	5	0	2	10	3rd	League Quarter-Final	Manus Boyle	4–32
1991	–	Ulster Final	1	7	4	1	2	9	2nd	League Semi-Final	Declan Bonner	4–37
1992	**All-Ireland Champions**	**Ulster Champions**	1B	5	4	0	1	8	1st	League Quarter-Final	Manus Boyle	1–37
1993	–	Ulster Final	B	7	7	0	0	14	1st	**League Final**	Declan Bonner	2–38
1994	–	Ulster Semi-Final	1	7	4	0	3	8	3rd	League Quarter-Final	Manus Boyle	2–51
1995	–	Ulster Quarter-Final	1	7	4	0	3	8	4th	**League Final**	Manus Boyle	2–64
1996	–	Ulster Preliminary Round	1	7	3	3	1	9	1st	**League Final**	Tony Boyle	4–34
1997	–	Ulster Semi-Final	1	7	1	2	4	4	8th	–	Tony Boyle	3–33
1998	–	Ulster Final	B	7	6	1	0	13	1st	League Semi-Final	Tony Boyle	2–38
1999	–	Ulster Quarter-Final	1A	7	3	0	4	6	6th	–	Tony Boyle	2–21
2000	–	Ulster Quarter-Final	1A	7	2	1	4	5	5th	–	Adrian Sweeney	3–39
2001	Qualifiers Round 2	Ulster Preliminary Round	1A	7	2	1	4	5	6th	–	Adrian Sweeney	1–32
2002	All-Ireland Quarter-Final	Ulster Final	1A	7	4	0	3	8	5th	–	Adrian Sweeney	4–52
2003	All-Ireland Semi-Final	Ulster Quarter-Final	1A	7	1	0	6	2	8th	–	Adrian Sweeney	2–58
2004	Qualifiers Round 4	Ulster Final	2A	7	7	0	0	14	1st	Division 2 Semi-Final	Brendan Devenney	8–50
2005	Qualifiers Round 2	Ulster Quarter-Final	1A	7	2	0	5	4	7th	–	Colm McFadden	4–49
2006	All-Ireland Quarter-Final	Ulster Final	2A	7	6	1	0	13	1st	Division 2 Final	Michael Doherty	5–59
2007	Qualifiers Round 3	Ulster Semi-Final	1A	7	6	1	0	13	1st	**Division 1 Champions**	Brendan Devenney	2–40
2008	Qualifiers Round 2	Ulster Quarter-Final	1	7	4	0	3	8	4th	–	Colm McFadden	1–60
2009	All-Ireland Quarter-Final	Ulster Quarter-Final	1	7	2	1	4	5	7th	–	Michael Murphy	2–39
2010	Qualifiers Round 1	Ulster Quarter-Final	2	7	4	0	3	8	3rd	–	Michael Murphy	4–50
2011	All-Ireland Semi-Final	**Ulster Champions**	2	7	4	2	1	10	1st	Division 2 Champions	Colm McFadden	4–44
2012	**All-Ireland Champions**	**Ulster Champions**	1	7	3	0	4	6	6th	–	Colm McFadden	4–45
2013	All-Ireland Quarter-Final	Ulster Final	1	7	2	1	4	5	7th	–	Michael Murphy	1–50
2014	**All-Ireland Final**	**Ulster Champions**	2	7	5	1	1	11	1st	Division 2 Final	Michael Murphy	5–63
2015	All-Ireland Quarter-Final	Ulster Final	1	7	3	1	3	7	4th	Division 1 Semi-Final	Michael Murphy	2–55
2016	All-Ireland Quarter-Final	Ulster Final	1	7	3	0	4	6	4th	Division 1 Semi-Final	Paddy McBrearty	1–59
2017	Qualifiers Round 4	Ulster Semi-Final	1	7	3	2	2	8	3rd	–	Michael Murphy	1–43
2018	Quarter-Finals Group Stage	**Ulster Champions**	1	7	1	1	5	3	7th	–	Paddy McBrearty	1–69
2019	Quarter-Finals Group Stage	**Ulster Champions**	2	7	5	0	2	10	2nd	Division 2 Champions	Jamie Brennan	6–37
2020	–	Ulster Final	1	7	3	1	3	7	5th	–	Michael Murphy	2-25
2021	–	Ulster Semi-Final	1 North	3	1	2	0	4	1st	Division 1 Semi-Final	Paddy McBrearty	1-38
2022	Qualifiers Round 2	Ulster Final	1	7	3	1	3	7	4th	–	Paddy McBrearty	4-33
2023	All-Ireland Preliminary Quarter-Final	Ulster Quarter-Final	1	7	1	1	5	3	8th	–	Oisín Gallen	1-33
2024			2	7	6	1	0	13	1st	Division 2 Champions		
**Total**	–	–	–	**0**	**0**	**0**	**0**	**0**	–	–	–	–
