= 2011 Donegal county football team season =

Donegal county football team
2011 season
- Manager: Jim McGuinness
- Stadium: MacCumhaill Park, Ballybofey
- All-Ireland SFC: Semi-finalist
- Ulster SFC: Winners

The following is a summary of Donegal county football team's 2011 season.

The 2011 Donegal county football team season was the franchise's 107th season since the County Board's foundation in 1905. The team ended the season as Ulster champions after winning the 2011 Ulster Senior Football Championship. It was their sixth title and a first since Brian McEniff led the team to Sam MCMXCII.

== Personnel changes ==
Ahead of the new season, Jim McGuinness was appointed as the team's manager, bringing to an end the era of John Joe Doherty. The arrival of McGuinness brought the first appearance of a soon-to-be revolutionary tactic The System.

McGuinness selected Michael Murphy as Donegal team captain, replacing Kevin Cassidy in the role.

== Panel ==
New manager Jim McGuinness included Kevin Cassidy (who intended to retire at the end of the previous season) and Michael Hegarty (who was not involved in the previous season) in his squad for the 2011 Dr McKenna Cup. Also named were several of the under-21s, including Peter Boyle, Thomas McKinley, Daniel McLaughlin, Kevin Mulhern and Antoin McFadden, and Johnny Bonner and Marty Boyle, stars of Naomh Conaill's run to the 2010 Ulster club football final. Johnny Bonner did not play in any of the league games.

McKenna Cup panel

Paul Durcan, Peter Boyle, Karl Lacey, Neil McGee, Barry Dunnion, Johnny Bonner, Tomas McKinley, Edward Kelly, Neil Gallagher, Rory Kavanagh, Christopher Murrin, Dermot Molloy, Michael Hegarty, Colm McFadden, Daniel McLaughlin, Marty Boyle, David Walsh, Adrian Hanlon, Michael Murphy, Paddy McGrath, Kevin Mulhern, Leo McLoone, Ryan Bradley, Kevin Cassidy, Frank McGlynn, Antoin McFadden.

Details

Team as per Donegal v Kildare, 2011 All-Ireland Quarter-final, 30 July 2011

No.	Player	Position	Club
1	Paul Durcan	Goalkeeper	The Four Masters
2	Frank McGlynn	Right corner back	Glenfin
3	Neil McGee	Full back	Gaoth Dobhair
4	Paddy McGrath	Left corner back	Ard an Rátha
5	Anthony Thompson	Right half back	Naomh Conaill
6	Karl Lacey	Centre back	The Four Masters
7	Kevin Cassidy	Left half back	Gaoth Dobhair
8	Neil Gallagher	Midfield	Glenswilly
9	Rory Kavanagh	Midfield	St Eunan's
10	Mark McHugh	Right half forward	Cill Chartha
11	Michael Hegarty	Centre forward	Cill Chartha
12	Ryan Bradley	Left half forward	Buncrana
13	Patrick McBrearty	Right corner forward	Cill Chartha
14	David Walsh	Full forward	Naomh Bríd
15	Colm McFadden	Left corner forward	St Michael's

No.	Player	Position	Club
16	Michael Boyle	Goalkeeper	Termon
17	Eddie Kelly	Full back	Urris
18	Michael Maguire	Right corner back	Glencolumbkille
19	Kevin Rafferty	Midfield	St Eunan's
20	Ciarán Mac Grianna	Centre forward	St Eunan's
21	Ross Wherity	Centre forward	St Eunan's
22	Fergal McNulty	Full forward	An Urnaigh
23	Gareth Concarr	Right half forward	Ard an Rátha
24	Ross Wherity	Right half back	St Eunan's
25	Barry Dunnion	Right half back	The Four Masters
26	Brendan Boyle	Left half forward	Ard an Rátha
27	Lee McFadden	Goalkeeper	Cloich Cheann Fhaola
28	Eoin Waide	Left half back	Naomh Conaill
29	Leo McLoone	Center half forward	Naomh Conaill

Christy Toye (St Michael's)

Championship panel

== Competitions ==
=== League ===
Opener: win vs Sligo

5 February 2011 Round 1	Donegal	2-11 – 1-14	Sligo	Ballybofey
	M Murphy 1-2 (pen, 2f), N McGee 1-0, L McLoone, D Molloy 0-2 (2f) each, C McFadden 0-3, S Griffin, R Kavanagh 0-1 each.	Report	M Breheny (2f), A Marren 0-4 each; D Kelly 1-1; T Taylor 0-2, S Gilmartin, M Quinn, S Davey 0-1 each.	Referee: Pádraig Hughes (Armagh)

19 February 2011 Round 2	Tyrone	0-06 – 1-10	Donegal	Omagh
	M Penrose 0-3 (3f), S Cavanagh (f), P Harte, E McGinley 0-1 each	Report	D Molloy 1-2, C McFadden 0-4 (3f), M Murphy 0-3 (2f), L McLoone 0-1	Referee: P Fox (Westmeath)

27 February 2011 Round 3	Donegal	0-08 – 1-05	Kildare	Letterkenny
	M Murphy 0-4 (4f), C McFadden 0-2 (2f), R Kavanagh, M Hegarty 0-1 each	Report	M Foley 1-0, F Dowling 0-2 (2f), E O'Flaherty, K Cribbin, E Callaghan 0-1 each	Referee: M Duffy (Sligo)

13 March 2011 Round 4	Meath	0-9 – 0-15	Donegal	Páirc Tailteann, Navan
	B Sheridan (2f), S O'Rourke (1f) 0-2 each, B Meade, N Crawford, J Sheridan ('45'), B Farrell (f), T Skelly 0-1 each.	Report	M Murphy 0-6 (2f), R Bradley, C McFadden (1f) 0-3 each, R Kavanagh 0-2, D Molloy 0-1	Referee: M Higgins (Fermanagh)

19 March 2011 Round 5	Derry	2-12 – 2-18	Donegal	Celtic Park, Derry
	C O'Boyle 2-1, C Gilligan 0-6 (6f), G O'Kane 0-2, C McGoldrick, E. Muldoon, C Kielt 0-1 each.	Report	M Murphy 1-7 (6f), C McFadden 1-3, D Molly 0-5 (5f), K Lacey, R Kavanagh, M McElhinney 0-1.	Referee: P Hughes (Armagh)

3 April 2011 Round 6	Donegal	1-17 – 0-08	Antrim	Ballyshannon
	C McFadden 1-5 (2f), M Murphy 0-3 (2f), K Cassidy, D Molloy (2f), M Hegarty 0-2 each, R Bradley, K Lacey, R Kavanagh 0-1 each	Report	T McCann 0-5 (3f), B Neeson 1-1 (1f), T O'Neill 0-2	Referee: M Duffy (Sligo)

10 April 2011 Round 7	Laois	1-15 – 1-11	Donegal	O'Moore Park, Portlaoise
	MJ Tierney 1-10 (9f, 1 '45), M Timmons, D Strong, P O'Leary, C Begley, J O'Loughlin 0-1 each	Report	D Molloy 1-1, C McFadden 0-3 (2f), M Murphy (1f), R Kavanagh, M McElhinney 0-2 each, A Thompson 0-1	Referee: M Higgins (Fermanagh)

24 April 2011
Final

Donegal	2-11 – 0-16	Laois
Michael Murphy (1-3), Colm McFadden (1-3), Kevin Cassidy (0-1), Rory Kavanagh (0-1), Mark McHugh (0-1), Ryan Bradley (0-1), D Walsh (0-1)	Report	Donie Kingston (0-4), Paul Cahillane (0-3), John O'Loughlin (0-2), Niall Donoher (0-2), Ross Munnelly (0-2), Darren Strong (0-1), Colm Begley (0-1), Michael John Tierney (0-1)

Croke Park, Dublin
Referee: Marty Duffy (Sligo)

=== Ulster Senior Football Championship ===
Kevin Rafferty missed the Ulster SFC final with an abductor muscle injury.

15 May 2011
3:30pm
Preliminary round

Donegal	1-10 - 0-7	Antrim
M McHugh 1-1, M Murphy 0-3 (3f), R Bradley, C McFadden (1f) 0-2 each, D Molloy, A Hanlon 0-1 each	Report	T McCann, P Cunningham (1f), K Niblock (2f) 0-2 each, M Dougan 0-1

MacCumhaill Park, Ballybofey
Attendance: 7,385
Referee: Maurice Deegan (Laois)
12 June 2011
3:30pm
Quarter-final

Donegal	2-14 - 1-8	Cavan
P McBrearty 1-3 (1f), C McFadden 0-5 (2f), R Kavanagh 1-0, D Molloy 0-2, K Cassidy, K Rafferty, L McLoone and M Murphy 0-1(f) each	Report	M Brennan 1-1, N McDermott 0-4 (3f), G McKiernan, F Flanagan and S Johnston 0-1 (f) each.

Breffni Park, Cavan
Attendance: 9,325
Referee: Marty Duffy (Sligo)
26 June 2011
3:30pm
Semi-final

Tyrone	0-9 - 2-6	Donegal
S O'Neill 0-2, S Cavanagh 0-2 (1f), P Jordan, B Dooher, O Mulligan, M Penrose and P Harte (f) 0-1 each	Report	C McFadden 1-1 (1f), D Molloy 1-0, M Murphy 0-2 (1f), K Cassidy, K Rafferty and P McBrearty 0-1 each

St Tiernach's Park, Clones
Attendance: 18,536
Referee: Joe McQuillan (Cavan)
17 July 2011
4:00pm
Final

Derry	0-08 - 1-11	Donegal
J Kielt 0-04 (2f), C Kielt 0-02, C Gilligan (f), M Donaghy 0-01 each	Report Report	M Murphy 1-02 (1-00 pen), C McFadden 0-04 (2f), M Hegarty, A Thompson 0-02 each, R Bradley 0-01

St Tiernach's Park, Clones
Attendance: 28,364
Referee: Maurice Deegan (Laois)

=== All-Ireland Senior Football Championship ===
30 July
6:00pm
Quarter-final

Donegal	1-12 - 0-14 A.E.T.	Kildare
C Toye 1-1, M Murphy 0-3 (1f), K Cassidy 0-2, K Lacey, R Kavanagh, M McHugh, R Bradley, P McBrearty, D Molloy 0-1 each	Report	E O'Flaherty 0-6 (4f), A Smith 0-2, E Bolton, P O'Neill, E Callaghan, J Kavanagh, G White (f), R Sweeney 0-1 each

Croke Park, Dublin
Attendance: 39,612
Referee: David Coldrick (Meath)
28 August 2011
3:30pm
Semi-final

Dublin	0-08 - 0-06	Donegal
B Brogan 0-04 (4f), S Cluxton 0-02 (1f, 1 '45), B Cullen, K McManamon 0-01 each	Report	C McFadden 0-4 (2f), K Cassidy, R Bradley 0-01 each

Croke Park, Dublin
Attendance: 81,436
Referee: Maurice Deegan (Laois)

== Management team ==
- Manager: Jim McGuinness
- Selectors: Rory Gallagher, Maxi Curran
- Goalkeeping coach: Pat Shovelin
- Strength and conditioning coach: Adam Speer
- Surgical consultant: Kevin Moran
- Team doctor: Charlie McManus
- Team physio: Dermot Simpson
- Physiotherapists: Charlie Molloy, Paul Coyle, Donal Reid, JD.

== Awards ==
=== All Stars ===
Donegal achieved three All Stars.

Pos.	Player	Team	Appearances
GK	Stephen Cluxton	Dublin	4
RCB	Marc Ó Sé	Kerry	3
FB	Neil McGee	Donegal	1
LCB	Michael Foley	Kildare	1
RWB	Kevin Cassidy	Donegal	2
CB	Karl Lacey	Donegal	3
LWB	Kevin Nolan	Dublin	1
MD	Bryan Sheehan	Kerry	1
MD	Michael D. Macauley	Dublin	1
RWF	Darran O'Sullivan	Kerry	1
CF	Alan Brogan^{FOTY}	Dublin	3
LWF	Paul Flynn	Dublin	1
RCF	Colm Cooper	Kerry	7
FF	Andy Moran	Mayo	1
LCF	Bernard Brogan	Dublin	2

County breakdown

- Dublin = 6
- Kerry = 4
- Donegal = 3
- Mayo = 1
- Kildare = 1
