= 1950 All-Ireland Senior Football Championship final =

- Event: 1950 All-Ireland Senior Football Championship
Mayo	Louth
2–5 (11)	1–6 (9)
- Date: 24 September 1950
- Venue: Croke Park, Dublin
- Referee: Simon Deignan (Cavan)
- Attendance: 76,174

The 1950 All-Ireland Senior Football Championship final was the 63rd All-Ireland Final and the deciding match of the 1950 All-Ireland Senior Football Championship, an inter-county Gaelic football tournament for the top teams in Ireland, between Mayo and Louth. The referee for the 1950 final was Simon Deignan, who played for Cavan in the 1947 and 1948 finals.

This was the first of two consecutive All-Ireland football titles won by Mayo, the second, beating Meath in 1951. They did not win their fourth for 75 years, winning again in 2026.

The attendance of 76,174 was the third highest on record in a final at that time.

== Match ==
=== First half ===
Mayo won the toss and elected to play against the wind in the first half. Nicky Roe put Louth ahead within the first minute. Mayo responded through Éamonn Mongey and took the lead when a well-placed shot by forward Peter Solan beat the Louth goalkeeper Thornton.

Mayo were forced into making a substitution with Billy Kenny being withdrawn following a collision with Louth midfielder Frank Reid. They increased their lead however with successive points from Mick Mulderrig and Joe Gilvarry. Nicky Roe then goaled for Louth who raised another white flag with a fisted point from wing-forward Jimmy McDonnell.

Mayo then replaced their starting goalkeeper Durkin with Seán Wynne. Nicky Roe kicked a free and scored the last point of the half on 32 minutes, to leave Louth a point in front at the interval.

=== Second Half ===
Roe continued where he had left off by pointing a free early on. Louth corner-forward Mickey Reynolds subsequently had an excellent goal chance but shot over the bar with the Mayo keeper Wynne beaten.

With the wind now more of a factor, Mayo replied with another point from the outstanding Éamonn Mongey. His midfield partner Pádraig Carney spurned two scoreable opportunities before the prolific Nicky Roe restored Louth's two-point lead.

Louth's cause was not helped with Roe having to leave the field due to injury and with five minutes remaining came the key moment of the match. Mayo snatched a freak goal after Seán Flanagan charged down a Seán Boyle clearance. Mick Flanagan took up possession and fisted to the Louth net after a twenty-yard run.

Mayo, finishing the stronger of the two sides, added a further point through Mick Mulderrig to lead by two (2-5 to 1–6) as full-time approached and there would be no response from the Wee County men.

=== Details ===
24 September 1950
15:15 IST
Final

Mayo	2–5 – 1–6	Louth
(HT: 1–3 – 1–4)
Gls: Peter Solan, Mick Flanagan; Pts: Éamonn Mongey (0-2), Mick Mulderrig (0-2), Joe Gilvarry (0-1)		Gls: Nicky Roe; Pts: Nicky Roe (0-5), Jimmy McDonnell (0-1)

Croke Park, Dublin
Referee: Simon Deignan (Cavan)
Attendance: 76,174

Mayo	Louth

GK	1	Billy Durkin (Swinford)
RCB	2	John Forde (Ardnaree Sarsfields)
FB	3	Paddy Prendergast (Ardara, Donegal)
LCB	4	Seán Flanagan (Ballaghaderreen) (c)
RHB	5	Peter Quinn (Ardnaree Sarsfields)
CHB	6	Henry Dixon (Mayo Abbey)
LHB	7	John McAndrew (Bangor Erris)
MF	8	Pádraig Carney (Swinford)
MF	9	Éamonn Mongey (Civil Service, Dublin)
RHF	10	Mick Flanagan (UCD, Dublin)
CHF	11	Billy Kenny (UCG, Galway)
LHF	12	Joe Gilvarry (Killala)
RCF	13	Mick Mulderrig (Ballina Stephenites)
FF	14	Tom Langan (Garda, Dublin)
LCF	15	Peter Solan (UCG, Galway)
Substitutes:
	16	Seán Wynne (Air Corps, Dublin) for Billy Durkin
	17	Mick Caulfield (Aghamore) for Billy Kenny
	18	Seán Mulderrig (Ballina Stephenites) for Mick Caulfield
	19	Tom Acton (Ballina Stephenites)
	20	Tommy Byrne (Castlebar Mitchels)
	21	Liam Hastings (Sarsfields, Kildare)
	22	Joe Staunton (Louisburgh)
	23	Paddy Irwin (Garda, Dublin)

GK	1	Seán Thornton (Civil Service, Dublin)
RCB	2	Michael Byrne (St Bride's)
FB	3	Tom Conlon (Stabannon Parnells) (c)
LCB	4	Jim Tuft (Dundalk Young Irelands)
RHB	5	Seán Boyle (St Mary's)
CHB	6	Paddy Markey (St Mary's)
LHB	7	Paddy McArdle (St Mary's)
MF	8	Jack Regan (Dundalk Gaels)
MF	9	Frank Reid (Dundalk Gaels)
RHF	10	Jimmy McDonnell (Darver Volunteers)
CHF	11	Nicky Roe (St Mary's)
LHF	12	Stephen White (Dundalk Young Irelands)
RCF	13	Roger Lynch (Geraldines)
FF	14	Hubert Reynolds (Dundalk Gaels)
LCF	15	Mickey Reynolds (Stabannon Parnells)
Substitutes:
	16	Ray Mooney (St Mary's) for Nicky Roe
	17	Michael McDonnell (Darver Volunteers) for Paddy McArdle
	18	Ronan Lynch (Geraldines)
	19	Jack Bell (St Mary's)
	20	Patsy Byrne (Stabannon Parnells)
	21	Owen Lynch (Stabannon Parnells)
	22	Peadar Smith (Oliver Plunketts)
	23	John Morgan (Dundalk Young Irelands)
