= 1948–49 National Football League (Ireland) =

Gaelic football competition

League details
- Dates: October 1948 – 10 April 1949

League champions
- Winners: Mayo (8th win)
- Captain: Tommy Byrne

League runners-up
- Runners-up: Louth
- Captain: Seán Boyle

The 1948–49 National Football League was the 18th staging of the National Football League, an annual Gaelic football tournament for the Gaelic Athletic Association county teams of Ireland.

Mayo won the NFL with a narrow defeat of Louth in the final.

== Format ==
Instead of geographic groupings, teams are placed into Divisions I, II, III and IV. The top team in each division reaches the semi-finals.

== League Phase ==
=== Division I (Dr Lagan Cup) ===
3 October 1948 Round	Down	0-10 — 0-7	Monaghan	Ballybay

10 October 1948 Round	Antrim	2-9 — 4-2	Armagh	Armagh

17 October 1948 Round	Down	3-10 — 3-6	Antrim	Newcastle

24 October 1948 Round	Monaghan	3-4 — 0-7	Armagh	Ballybay

31 October 1948 Final	Down	2-7 — 2-5	Tyrone	Lurgan

=== Division II ===
==== Group A Results ====
17 October 1948 Round 1	Galway	1-3 — 1-11	Mayo	Tuam
				Attendance: 10,000

31 October 1948 Round 2	Kerry	3-7 — 1-11	Galway	Austin Stack Park, Tralee

21 November 1948 Round 3	Mayo	4-6 — 1-3	Kerry	McHale Park, Castlebar

==== Group B Results ====
17 October 1948 Round 1	Roscommon	4-6 — 1-11	Sligo	Strokestown

31 October 1948 Round 2	Sligo	2-5 — 2-6	Leitrim	Collooney

14 November 1948 Round 3	Leitrim	2-5 — 3-8	Roscommon	Ballinamore

==== Division II Final ====
6 March 1949 Final	Mayo	2-11 — 1-5	Roscommon	Ballina

==== Tables ====
===== Group A =====
Team	Pld	W	D	L	Pts	Status
Mayo	2	2	0	0	4	Qualified for Knockout stage
Kerry	2	1	0	1	2
Galway	2	0	0	2	0

===== Group B =====
Team	Pld	W	D	L	Pts	Status
Roscommon	2	2	0	0	4
Leitrim	2	1	0	1	2
Sligo	2	0	0	2	0

=== Division III ===
==== Group A ====
Westmeath, Cavan, Meath

==== Group B ====
Louth, Dublin, Longford

==== Group B Results ====
31 October 1948 Round 1	Longford	1-2 — 4-8	Louth	Longford

==== Division III Final ====
6 March 1949

Louth	2-5 – 2-4	Cavan

Croke Park, Dublin

=== Division IV ===
==== Group A ====
Limerick, Tipperary, Clare

==== Section B ====
Wexford, Wicklow, Carlow

==== Section C ====
Offaly, Kildare, Laois, Cork

==== Group C Results ====
17 October 1948 Round 1	Laois	3-3 — 2-4	Cork	O'Moore Park, Portlaoise

==== Play-Off ====
6 February 1949	Wexford	3-4 — 0-9	Kildare	Wexford Park, Wexford

== Knockout phase ==
=== Semi-final ===
27 March 1949

Mayo	4-11 – 2-6	Wexford

Croke Park, Dublin

27 March 1949

Louth	4-5 – 3-4	Down

Croke Park, Dublin

=== Final ===
10 April 1949

Mayo	1-08 – 1-06	Louth
P Carney 0-4 (4f); T Acton 1-0; S Mulderrig, H Dixon, P Solan, M Flanagan 0-1 each		Jim Quigley 0-4 (3f); Frank Fagan 1-1, Stephen White 0-1

Croke Park, Dublin
Attendance: 28,342
Referee: Simon Deignan (Cavan)

GK	1	Tommy Byrne (Castlebar Mitchels)
RCB	2	Paddy Gilvarry (Killala)
FB	3	Paddy Prendergast (Dungloe, Donegal)
LCB	4	John Forde (Ardnaree Sarsfields)
RHB	5	Billy Kenny (UCG, Galway)
CHB	6	Éamonn Mongey (Civil Service, Dublin)
LHB	7	Seán Mulderrig (Ballina Stephenites)
MF	8	Pádraig Carney (UCD, Dublin)
MF	9	Henry Dixon (Claremorris)
RHF	10	Liam Hastings (UCD, Dublin)
CHF	11	Tom Langan (Garda, Dublin)
LHF	12	Joe Gilvarry (Killala)
RCF	13	Tom Acton (Ballina Stephenites)
FF	14	Peter Solan (UCG, Galway)
LCF	15	Mick Flanagan (UCD, Dublin)

GK	1	Seán Thornton (Civil Service, Dublin)
RCB	2	Jack Bell (St Mary's)
FB	3	Johnny Malone (St Mary's)
LCB	4	Tom Mulligan (Dundalk Young Irelands)
RHB	5	Seán Boyle (St Mary's)
CHB	6	Paddy Markey (St Mary's)
LHB	7	Paddy McArdle (St Mary's)
MF	8	Jack Regan (Dundalk Gaels)
MF	9	Hubert Reynolds (Dundalk Gaels)
RHF	10	Frank Fagan (Dundalk Young Irelands)
CHF	11	Jim Quigley (Dundalk Young Irelands)
LHF	12	Stephen White (Dundalk Young Irelands)
RCF	13	Hugh O'Rourke (Cooley Kickhams)
FF	14	Tom Walsh (Owen Roe's)
LCF	15	Mickey Reynolds (Stabannon Parnells)
