= 1951 All-Ireland Senior Football Championship final =

- Event: 1951 All-Ireland Senior Football Championship
Mayo	Meath
2–8 (14)	0–9 (9)
- Date: 23 September 1951
- Venue: Croke Park, Dublin
- Referee: Bill Delaney (Laois)
- Attendance: 78,201

The 1951 All-Ireland Senior Football Championship final was the 64th All-Ireland Final and the deciding match of the 1951 All-Ireland Senior Football Championship, an inter-county Gaelic football tournament for the top teams in Ireland. Mayo and Meath met to decide the destination of the Sam Maguire Cup.

== Match ==
=== Summary ===
Mayo won their second title in a row with goals by Tommy Langan and Joe Gilvarry. This was Mayo's third All-Ireland SFC title overall, and their last until 2026. It would also be their last appearance in the All-Ireland final until 1989.

It was said that a legendary curse overshadowed Mayo football after 1951 – see Sports-related curses and Mayo county football team#Curse.

=== Details ===
23 September 1951
15:15
Final

Mayo	2–8 – 0–9	Meath
Gls: T Langan & J Gilvarry (1–0); Pts: E Mongey, & J Gilvarry & P Irwin (0–1) & P Carney (0–5, four frees)		Pts: P Meegan & P McDermott (0–2), C Hand, J Reilly, M McDonnell, F Byrne & D Taafle (0–1)

Croke Park, Dublin
Referee: Bill Delaney (Laois)
Attendance: 78,201

Mayo	Meath

==== Mayo ====
- 1 S. Wynne
- 2 J. Forde
- 3 P. Prendergast
- 4 S. Flanagan (c)
- 5 J. Staunton
- 6 H. Dixon
- 7 P. Quinn
- 8 É. Mongey
- 9 J. McAndrew
- 10 P. Irwin
- 11 P. Carney
- 12 S. Mulderrig
- 13 M. Flanagan
- 14 T. Langan
- 15 J. Gilvarry

Sub used
20 L. Hastings for H. Dixon

Subs not used
16 W. Casey
17 J. Curran
18 P. Jordan
19 M. Loftus (awarded retrospectively)
21 M. Mulderrig

==== Meath ====
- 1 K. Smyth
- 2 M. O'Brien
- 3 P. O'Brien
- 4 K. McConnell
- 5 S. Heery (c)
- 6 C. Kelly
- 7 C. Hand
- 8 D. Taaffe
- 9 P. Connell
- 10 F. Byrne
- 11 M. McDonnell
- 12 P. Meegan
- 13 B. Smyth
- 14 J. Reilly
- 15 P. McDermott

Subs used
16 P. Dixon for C. Hand
7 C. Hand for S. Heery

Subs not used
17 P. Carolan
18 B. Ruske
19 L. McGuinness
20 A. Foran

Trainer
P. Tully

== 55 years later... ==
Mayo players Willie Casey, Paddy Jordan and former GAA President Dr. Mick Loftus belatedly received their All-Ireland senior football medals 55 years later. Though squad members, they had not appeared as substitutes in the final and had initially been denied their medals.
