= Keadue, County Donegal =

Keadue Céideadh
- Townland
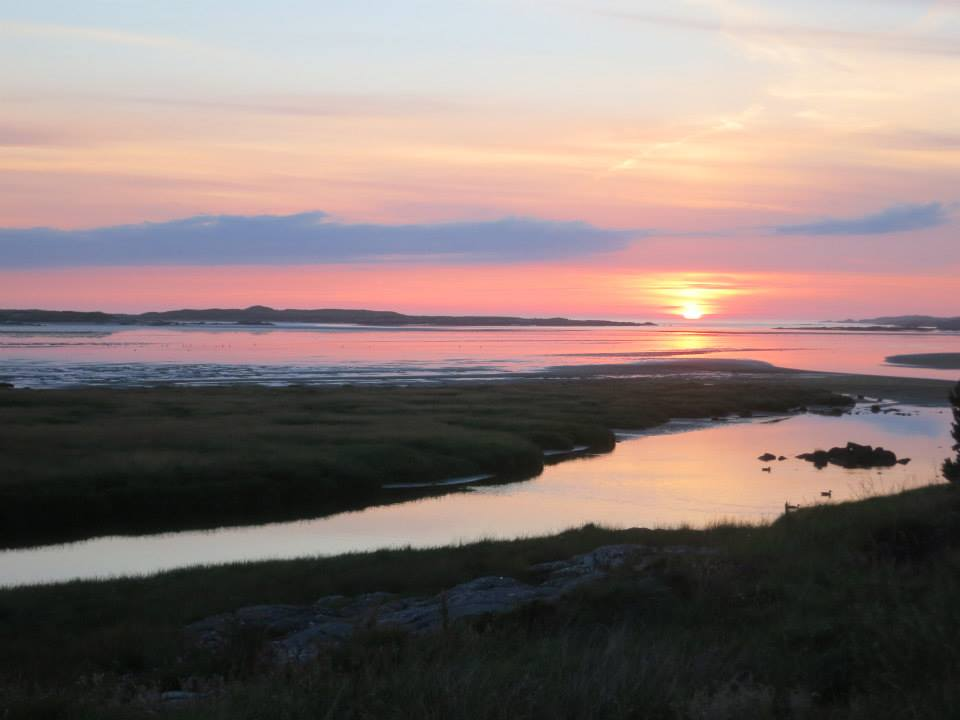
- Keadue Strand

- Location in Ireland
- Coordinates: 54°59′49″N 8°25′11″W
- Country: Ireland
- Province: Ulster
- County: County Donegal
- Elevation: 26 m (85 ft)
- Time zone: UTC+0 (WET)
  - Summer (DST): UTC-1 (IST (WEST))
- Irish Grid Reference: M835815

Keadue (Irish: Céideadh) is a townland in County Donegal, Ireland. It is in the Rosses region of northwest County Donegal, on the R259 road on the Wild Atlantic Way, about halfway between the fishing villages of Burtonport and Kincasslagh on the Atlantic coast.

== Sport ==
Keadue is most well known for its football team, Keadue Rovers, who play their home games at Central Park in Keadue. Ireland goalkeeper, Packie Bonner, from nearby Cloughglass, started his career at Keadue.

The local GAA team is Dungloe GAA, who play 8 km away in Dungloe. Gaelic football All-Star, Tony Boyle, member of the 1992 Donegal All-Ireland winning team, was born in Keadue.

Former UFC mixed martial artist Joseph Duffy is from Meenbanad, the bordering townland.

== Language ==
Keadue is in the Gaeltacht region, which means the official language of the area is Irish. However, the use of Irish has been in decline since the 1950s.

== Education ==
The local national school is Keadue National School (Irish: Scoil an Aingil Choiméadaí, An Céideadh) with 20 pupils, and the nearest secondary school is Rosses Community School in Dungloe.

== Music ==
Since 1888, Keadue has been home to The Keadue Band, one of many marching fife and drum bands from the area.

== Transport ==
Keadue is situated 10 km from Donegal Regional Airport which is serviced by daily Aer Lingus flights to Dublin Airport and also does a flight to Glasgow. The region has one bus stop run by TFI local link, 961 Crolly/Letterkenny runs to Keadue
