= Peter Solan =

Peter Solan may refer to:

- Peter Solan (Gaelic footballer) (1929–1985), Gaelic football corner forward
- Peter Solan (director) (1929–2013), Slovak film director
