= 1933 All-Ireland Junior Football Championship =

All Ireland Champions
- Winners: Mayo

All Ireland Runners-up
- Runners-up: London

Provincial Champions
- Munster: Cork
- Leinster: Carlow
- Ulster: Donegal
- Connacht: Mayo

The 1933 All-Ireland Junior football championship was the 16th staging of the All-Ireland Junior Football Championship since its establishment by the GAA in 1912. Mayo won the 1933 competition.

The competition format saw the four provincial champions compete in two 'home' semi-finals, the winners of which then contested the All-Ireland 'home' final. The 'home final' was won by the Connacht champions, Mayo county football team, over the Ulster champions, the Donegal county football team, the latter making their first ever appearance in Croke Park and their first ever national final. The scoreline was Mayo 2-15 Donegal 2-2.

In the last stage of the competition, the victorious 'home' finalists then met the champions of Britain to determine who would be crowned overall All-Ireland Junior Football Champions. In this final, Mayo defeated London, the champions of Britain, on a scoreline of 3–07 to 2-04.

== Results ==
=== Provincial finals ===
==== Ulster Junior Football Championship ====
Final	Donegal	3–07 - 1–03	Derry

Donegal team: James McEnhill (Donegal), Joe Lawn (Dungloe), J.P. McGinley(Kilcar), John Brown (Carrick), E. Brady, Gallinagh (Ballyshannon), T. Diver(Gaoth Dobhair), P. Clancy, J McGee (Dungloe), T. Gallagher (Ardara), John O’Donnell (Dungloe) Maxwell, Campbell, Owenie McFadden and Kevin 'Hotel' Sweeney(Dungloe).

==== Munster Junior Football Championship ====
Final	Cork	2–02 - 1–03	Kerry

Kerry team: Brendan Reidy( Austin Stacks), P Mahony(John Mitchell), Paddy 'Boss' Walsh(St Mary's Caherciveen), Paddy Curran(John Mitchells), Tim O' Sullivan(John Mitchells), Simon Moynihan(Listowel Emmet's), Toddy Walsh(Listowel Emmet's), P Murphy(John Mitchells), G Stack(Listowel Emmet's), Paddy Mc Mahon(Laune Rangers) John Joe Falvey(Laune Rangers), Paddy Drummond(Austin Stacks), Florie Kerins(John Mitchells), Willie Brick(Kerins O Rahillys), Ted Chute(Listowel Emmet's)

==== Leinster Junior Football Championship ====
Final	Carlow	5–03 - 4–05	Wicklow

Carlow team: Paddy Lyons (goal); Jackie Geoghegan, Jim Hendrick, Billy Nolan; Rexie McDonnell, Tom Mulhall, James Farrell; Lar Keeffe, Paddy Fennell; Ned Butler, Paddy Barron, Mick Brennan; Tom Walker (captain), Mick Price, Paddy Shine. Sub: Sylvester McGrath.

==== Connacht Junior Football Championship ====
Final	Mayo	3–00 - 1–05	Galway

=== All-Ireland semi-finals ===
'Home' semi-final 1	Donegal	1–08 - 2–02	Cork

'Home' semi-final 2	Mayo	2–06 - 1–03	Carlow

Carlow team: Paddy Lyons (goal); Jackie Geoghegan, Billy Nolan, Jim Hendrick; Dinny Nolan, Rexie McDonnell, Tom Mulhall; Lar Keeffe, Paddy Fennell; Ned Butler, Mick Brennan, Paddy Barron, Paddy Shine.

=== All-Ireland 'home' final ===
'Home' final	Donegal	2–02 - 2–15	Mayo

Donegal team: Joe McEnhill (Donegal), Joe Lawn (Dungloe), T Diver (Gaoth Dobhair), J.P. McGinley(Kilcar), John Brown (Carrick), Bernie O' Donnell (Dungloe), Gallinagh (Ballyshannon), P Mc Manus (Bundoran), T. Clancy (Dungloe), J McGee (Dungloe), T. Gallagher (Ardara), John O’Donnell (Dungloe), Owenie McFadden (Gaoth Dobhair) and Kevin 'Hotel' Sweeney (Dungloe).

Mayo team: Gara, O'Loughlin, Coffey, Frazer, T Regan, Rafferty, Collins, Grear, P.J. Walsh, Carney, Conboy, Taffey, O'Brien, Kelly, Culkin

=== All-Ireland final ===
1933

Mayo	3-07 – 2-04	London

Referee: S. O’Neill (Dublin)
