= Keadue Rovers F.C. =

Keadue Rovers FC
- Full name: Keadue Rovers Football Club
- Nickname: The Gulls
- Founded: 1896; 130 years ago
- Ground: Central Park, Keadue
- League: Donegal Junior League Premier Division
- Website: www.keadueroversfc.com
Home colours	Away colours

Keadue Rovers Football Club is an Irish association football club based in Keadue, County Donegal. The club's senior men's team competes in the Premier Division of the Donegal Junior League.

Nicknamed "The Gulls", Keadue play their home games at Central Park. Keadue are the most successful club in the history of the Donegal Junior League.

The club's most famous past player is Packie Bonner, who signed for Celtic at the age of 18. Denis Bonner, Packie Bonner's twin brother, is a former player and centre-half who later signed for Galway United and Sligo Rovers.

Other players to don the club's candy stripes include Tony Boyle, an All-Ireland winner with Donegal in 1992, Adrian Hanlon, All-Ireland winner in 2012, Adrian Sweeney, Martin Ferry (formerly of Ayr United and Limavady United), Lee Boyle (formerly of Aston Villa) and Mark Forker (formerly of Hearts and Finn Harps), Carl McHugh, who captained Motherwell to the 2018 Scottish Cup Final, and played for Bradford City in the 2013 English League Cup Final. Other names synonymous with the club are its most successful manager, Manus McCole, and groundskeeper Anthony "Dutch" Doherty.

In August 2023, the club started work on an extension to the clubhouse to facilitate the rapidly growing number of players at the club.

== History ==
Founded in 1896, Keadue played their first match against Mullaghduff Celtic in early May that year. Keadue won the match at Mullaghderg Banks 1–0 with their centre forward, Manus Boner, scoring the club's first goal. The North-West Donegal League was formed in 1953 and Keadue Rovers became the league's first champions. Keadue won additional championships in 1959, 1960 and 1963.

In 1971, a Donegal League was formed which included teams from the whole county. Keadue were one of the founding members and participated in the inaugural season of the new league. The club's first game took place in March 1972 which they won, beating Donegal Town 3–2. Keadue won the competition for the first time in the 1977–78 season under manager Manus McCole. At the end of that season, former player Packie Bonner signed for Celtic. Bonner had come through the youth system at Keadue Rovers and left for Finn Harps before signing for Celtic. He went on to represent his country at international level, appearing in two World Cups, and made over 600 appearances for Celtic in all competitions.

Packie's twin brother, Denis Bonner, was a centre-half with Keadue and he won the IAWS Cup with the club in 1980 before also departing for Finn Harps. Denis Bonner later signed for Galway United in 1982 and finished his career at Sligo Rovers. As for Keadue, another Donegal League title followed in the 1986–87 season, which the club retained in the 1987–88 season. Their next league trophy was won in 1992–93 and was again retained the following season when the club won the 1993–94 league. As well as league titles, Keadue also won multiple cup competitions in the county including the IAWS Cup, the Area Shield, the Donegal Area Junior Cup, the Ulster Cup and the Sportsman Cup.

Keadue Rovers celebrated the club's centenary by welcoming Packie Bonner and Celtic to play a game at Central Park. A crowd of 3,000 spectators were in attendance to watch the match on 20 July 1996. Keadue also made the step up to intermediate level the same year, leaving the Donegal Junior League to join the Ulster Senior League for the 1996–97 season. However, after more than a decade in the provincial competition, the club withdrew from intermediate football in 2008.

In 2016, Keadue commenced plans to add a new pitch at Central Park. In August 2021, Keadue played the first league game on their new pitch, adjacent to the old pitch. In November 2025, the club were granted planning permission to build a seated spectator stand at Central Park.

== Club identity ==
Situated on the Atlantic coast, the club are nicknamed "the Gulls".
