= Paddy Prendergast (Gaelic footballer) =

Irish Gaelic footballer (1926–2021)

Personal information
- Native name: Pádraig de Priondragás (Irish)
- Nickname: Ballet
- Born: 1926 Ballintubber, County Mayo, Ireland
- Died: 26 September 2021 (aged 95) Tralee, County Kerry, Ireland
- Occupation: Garda Síochána
- Height: 5 ft 11 in (180 cm)
- Spouse: Irene Prendergast
- Children: 3

Sport
- Sport: Gaelic football
- Position: Full-back
Clubs
- Years: Club
- Dungloe; Ballintubber
Club titles
- Mayo titles: 0
Inter-county
Years	County	Apps (scores)
1946–1947 1948–1956	Donegal; Mayo	27 (0-00)
Inter-county titles
- Connacht titles: 5
- All-Irelands: 2
- NFL: 2

Patrick Prendergast (1926 – 26 September 2021) was an Irish Gaelic footballer. At club level, he played with Dungloe and Ballintubber and was a member of the Donegal and Mayo senior football teams. He usually lined out as a full-back.

Prendergast won consecutive All-Ireland Senior Football Championship titles with Mayo in 1950 and 1951. At his death he was the last surviving member of the fifteen who lined out in the 1951 final.

== Early life and career ==
Prendergast was born in Ballintubber, County Mayo, in 1926, and began playing football with the local club. He joined the Garda Síochána and in 1946 was posted to Dungloe in the Rosses in west County Donegal, where he played with the local club and was called up to the Donegal senior football team.

== Mayo ==
Prendergast declared for his native county in 1948. His first season ended in defeat by Cavan in the All-Ireland final, but brought the first of four consecutive Connacht Senior Football Championship titles.

He was at full-back when Mayo beat Louth in the 1950 final and Meath in the 1951 final to take back-to-back All-Ireland titles.

== Playing career ==
Although born in Ballintubber, County Mayo, Prendergast first came to prominence with the Dungloe club in County Donegal. His performances at club level earned a call-up to the Donegal senior football team. After a number of years with Donegal, Prendergast declared for the Mayo senior football team in 1948. His debut season with his native county saw him win the first of four consecutive Connacht Championship titles, however, the season ended with an All-Ireland final defeat by Cavan. Prendergast lined out at full-back when Mayo won back-to-back All-Ireland Championship titles after defeats of Louth in 1950 and Meath in 1951. He continued to line out with the team until 1956, by which time he had claimed a fifth Connacht Championship title as well as two National League titles. Prendergast was also a Railway Cup-winner with Connacht.

== Personal life and death ==
Paddy spent his entire working career as a member of the Garda Síochána. After being initially stationed in Dungloe, County Donegal, he was later posted back to Mayo and eventually settled in Tralee, County Kerry.

Prendergast died on 26 September 2021, at the age of 95. He was the last surviving member of Mayo's 1951 All-Ireland final-winning starting fifteen.

== Honours ==
Mayo

- All-Ireland Senior Football Championship: 1950, 1951
- Connacht Senior Football Championship: 1948, 1949, 1950, 1951, 1955
- National Football League: 1948–49, 1953–54

Connacht

- Railway Cup: 1951
