= 2021 Donegal county football team season =

Donegal county football team
2021 season
- Manager: Declan Bonner
- Stadium: MacCumhaill Park, Ballybofey
- NFL D1: Semi-finalist
- All-Ireland SFC: Did not compete
- Ulster SFC: Semi-finalist

The following is a summary of Donegal county football team's 2021 season.

== Personnel changes ==
Paul Fisher departed as strength and conditioning coach and Antoin McFadden replaced him. Karl Lacey also departed from the management team. James Gallagher returned as goalkeeping coach (his second time in that role), replacing Andrew McGovern.

== Competitions ==
=== Dr McKenna Cup ===
There was no McKenna Cup in 2021 due to the impact of the COVID-19 pandemic on Gaelic games.

=== National Football League Division 1 North ===
The 2021 competition was delayed due to the COVID-19 pandemic.

Donegal qualified for the semi-finals.

==== Table ====
Pos	Team	Pld	W	D	L	PF	PA	PD	Pts	Qualification
1	Donegal	3	1	2	0	38	36	+2	4	Advance to NFL semi-finals
2	Tyrone	3	1	1	1	37	34	+3	3	Advance to NFL semi-finals
3	Armagh	3	1	1	1	35	36	−1	3	Advance to a relegation playoff; losers are relegated to Division 2
4	Monaghan	3	0	2	1	35	39	−4	2	Advance to a relegation playoff; losers are relegated to Division 2

Updated to match(es) played on 29 May 2021. Source: GAA.ie
Rules for classification: Tiebreakers

==== Fixtures ====
15 May 2021 Round 1	Tyrone	0-16 (16) – (18) 0-18	Donegal	Omagh
17:00				Venue: Healy Park
		Report		Referee: Joe McQuillan (Cavan)

22 May 2021 Round 2	Donegal	1–20 (23) – (23) 4–11	Monaghan	Ballybofey
17:00				Venue: MacCumhaill Park
		Report		Referee: Barry Cassidy (Derry)

29 May 2021 Round 3	Armagh	1-16 (19) – (19) 1-16	Donegal	Armagh
19:30				Venue: Athletic Grounds
		Report		Referee: Maurice Deegan (Laois)

12 June 2021 Semi-Final	Donegal	1-14 (17) – (21) 1-18	Dublin	Cavan
19:15				Venue: Kingspan Breffni Park
		Report		Referee: Ciaran Brannigan (Down)

=== Ulster Senior Football Championship ===
The draw for the 2021 Ulster Championship was made on 22 April 2021.

==== Bracket ====
Preliminary round
Down	1-12
Donegal	2-25

Quarter-finals
Armagh	4-15
Antrim	0-14
Monaghan	1-21
Fermanagh	0-14
Tyrone	1-18
Cavan	0-13
Derry	0-15
Donegal	0-16

Semi-finals
Armagh	2-21
Monaghan	4-17
Tyrone	0-23
Donegal	1-14

Final
Monaghan	0-15
Tyrone	0-16

==== Fixtures ====
27 June 2021
19:00
Preliminary Round

Down	1-12 - 2-25	Donegal
Caolan Mooney (1-0), Barry O’Hagan (0-8), Liam Kerr (0-2), James Guinness (0-1), Darren O’Hagan (0-1)	Report	Patrick McBrearty (1-6), Jamie Brennan (1-1), Ryan McHugh (0-4), Michael Langan (0-4), Peadar Mogan (0-3), Michael Murphy (0-2), Ciaran Thompson (0-1), Niall O’Donnell (0-1), Eoin McHugh (0-1), Conor O’Donnell (0-1), Ethan O’Donnell (0-1)

Pairc Esler, Newry
Referee: Maurice Deegan (Laois)

11 July 2021; 16:00; Quarter-final	Donegal	0-16 - 0-15	Derry	MacCumhaill Park, Ballybofey; Attendance: 0 (Note: The game was played behind closed doors due to the impact of the COVID-19 pandemic on Gaelic games.); Referee: David Coldrick (Meath)
11 July 2021; 16:00; Quarter-final	Paddy McBrearty (0-2f), Michael Langan and Niall O’Donnell 0-3 each, Caolan McGonagle, Jamie Brennan and Michael Murphy (0-2f) 0-2 each, Paul Brennan 0-1.	Report	Shane McGuigan 0-4 (0-2f), Ciaran McFaul 0-3, Benny Heron 0-2, Padraig Cassidy, Gareth McKinless, Conor Doherty, Conor Glass, Emmett Bradley and Niall Loughlin 0-1 each.	MacCumhaill Park, Ballybofey; Attendance: 0 Referee: David Coldrick (Meath)

18 July 2021; 13:45 IST (UTC+1); Semi-final	Tyrone	0-23 - 1-14	Donegal	Brewster Park, Enniskillen; Referee: Joe McQuillan (Cavan)
18 July 2021; 13:45 IST (UTC+1); Semi-final	Darren McCurry (0-7, 3 frees), Kieran McGeary, Niall Sludden, Tiernan McCann (0-3 each), Mattie Donnelly (0-2), Peter Harte, Conor Meyler, Conor McKenna, Frank Burns (0-1 each), Cathal McShane (0-1 free)	Report	Paddy McBrearty (0-4, 2 frees), Caolan McGonigle (1-0), Jamie Brennan, Niall O’Donnell (0-2 each), Michael Langan (0-2, 1 free), Michael Murphy (0-2 frees), Ciaran Thompson, Peader Mogan (0-1 each)	Brewster Park, Enniskillen; Referee: Joe McQuillan (Cavan)

=== All-Ireland Senior Football Championship ===
Due to the impact of the COVID-19 pandemic on Gaelic games, there was no back-door route into the All-Ireland Championship. Therefore, because Donegal did not win the Ulster Championship, they did not qualify for the 2021 All-Ireland Championship.

== Management team ==
Confirmed in November 2017, with replacements noted:

- Manager: Declan Bonner
- Assistant manager: Paul McGonigle, not listed among November 2017 appointments
- Head coach: John McElholm
- Coach: Gary Boyle
- Selector: Stephen Rochford, replacing Karl Lacey after 2018 season but Lacey actually carried on until the end of 2020
- Goalkeeping coach: James Gallagher, after 2020 season replacing Andrew McGovern
- Strength and conditioning coach: Antoin McFadden, who after 2020 season, replaced Paul Fisher
- Nutritionist: Ronan Doherty
- Team physician: Kevin Moran
- Physio: Cathal Ellis
- Psychology and performance manager: Anthony McGrath, previously involved with the minor team
- Video analysis: Chris Byrne
- Logistics: Packie McDyre
- Kitman: Barry McBride

== Awards ==
=== GAA.ie Football Team of the Week ===
- 17 May: Shaun Patton, Neil McGee, Michael Murphy
- 24 May: Michael Langan
- 31 May: Ryan McHugh, Patrick McBrearty (McBrearty voted Footballer of the Week)
- 28 June: Ryan McHugh, Patrick McBrearty
- 12 July: Caolan McGonagle, Niall O'Donnell
- 19 July: Eoghan Bán Gallagher

=== All Stars ===
One nomination, for Michael Langan
