= John O'Donnell (Gaelic footballer) =

Irish Gaelic footballer

Personal information
- Native name: Seán Ó Domhnaill (Irish)
- Born: 1910 Dungloe, County Donegal, Ireland
- Died: 7 January 1954 (aged 43) Knockmore, County Mayo, Ireland
- Height: 6 ft 0 in (183 cm)

Sport
- Sport: Gaelic football
- Position: Centre forward
Club
- Years: Club
- 1928–1937: An Clochán Liath
Club titles
- Donegal titles: 4
Inter-county
- Years: County
- 1929–1937: Donegal
Inter-county titles
- Ulster titles: 2 (junior)

John "Hughie" O'Donnell (born Daniel John O'Donnell 1910 - 7 January 1954) was an Irish Gaelic footballer. A native of Dungloe, he was the foremost player in County Donegal, and a household name throughout the country, in the mid-1930s. O'Donnell had become one of Ulster's most popular footballers by the time he made his last appearance for the province in the Railway Cup of 1937.

== Playing career ==
=== Club ===
O'Donnell was captain of An Clochán Liath's senior football team and his playing career coincided with what was, by far, the club's most successful period. During his seven years playing, they won the Donegal County Championship four times (1930, 1931, 1933, 1936) and were runners up twice in 1932 and 1934.

=== Inter-county ===
O'Donnell's career with the Donegal county team began around 1930 and ended in 1937. During that time, he captained the first Donegal team to play in Croke Park where they lost the 1933 "Home final" of the All-Ireland Junior Football Championship to Mayo. He also captained Donegal when they captured the Dr Lagan Cup in 1936 and 1937. In 1984, 50 years after his playing days and 30 years after his death, O'Donnell was named on the "Best Ever Donegal Team" as part of the GAA centenary Celebrations that year.

=== Sigerson and Interprovincial ===
John O'Donnell is reportedly the first Donegal player to have won a Sigerson Cup medal. He won twice, in 1930 and again in 1931, playing with University College Dublin (and scoring half of the UCD tally of 2-4 in the 1931 final.) He also represented his province and was a member of Ulster Railway Cup teams between 1933 and 1937.
