= Gareth Concarr =

Gaelic footballer

Gareth Concarr is a Gaelic footballer who played with Donegal. He won a Donegal Senior Football Championship in 2004. He is recognised as a scorer of goals over many years.
