= Kevin Mulhern =

Gaelic footballer

Kevin Mulhern is a Gaelic footballer who played with Donegal. He won an Ulster U21 Title and played in the 2010 All-Ireland Under-21 Football Championship Final. He played Senior for Donegal when Jim McGuinness took over as manager.
