= Willie Casey (Gaelic footballer) =

Irish Gaelic footballer

Personal information
- Native name: Liam Ó Cathasaigh (Irish)
- Born: 1932 Ballina, County Mayo, Ireland
- Died: 3 December 2016 (aged 83) Ballina, County Mayo, Ireland

Sport
- Sport: Gaelic football
- Position: Left corner-back
Club
- Years: Club
- Ballina Stephenites
Club titles
- Mayo titles: 2
Inter-county
Years	County	Apps (scores)
1951–1964	Mayo	18 (0–03)
Inter-county titles
- Connacht titles: 1
- All-Irelands: 1
- NFL: 1

William Casey (1932 – 3 December 2016) was an Irish Gaelic footballer. His league and championship career at senior level with the Mayo county team spanned thirteen seasons from 1951 to 1964.

Casey first came to prominence on the inter-county scene at the age of eighteen when he was a key member of the Mayo junior team. He won an All-Ireland medal in 1951 before being promoted to the senior grade the following year. Casey made his debut during the 1951-52 league. Over the course of the next thirteen seasons he became a regular member of the starting fifteen and won one Connacht medal and one National Football League medal as a member of the extended panel. He played his last game for Mayo in July 1964.

== Career statistics ==
Team	Season	National League			Connacht		All-Ireland		Total	
Team	Season	Division	Apps	Score	Apps	Score	Apps	Score	Apps	Score
Mayo	1951-52	Division 3	3	0-00	0	0-00	0	0-00	3	0-00
Mayo	1952-53	Division 3	5	0-00	2	0-00	0	0-00	7	0-00
Mayo	1953-54	Division 3	4	0-00	0	0-00	0	0-00	4	0-00
Mayo	1954-55	Division 3	4	0-00	1	0-00	2	0-00	7	0-00
Mayo	1955-56	Division 2	6	0-00	1	0-00	0	0-00	7	0-00
Mayo	1956-57	Division 2	6	0-00	1	0-00	0	0-00	7	0-00
Mayo	1957-58	Division 2	7	0-00	2	0-00	0	0-00	9	0-00
Mayo	1958-59	Division 2	6	0-01	3	0-00	0	0-00	9	0-01
Mayo	1959-60	Division 2	6	0-00	1	0-00	0	0-00	7	0-00
Mayo	1960-61	Division 2	0	0-00	0	0-00	0	0-00	0	0-00
Mayo	1961-62	Division 2	5	0-00	2	0-03	0	0-00	7	0-03
Mayo	1962-63	Division 2	0	0-00	1	0-00	0	0-00	1	0-00
Mayo	1963-64	Division 2	6	0-00	2	0-00	0	0-00	8	0-00
Total			58	0-01	16	0-03	2	0-00	76	0-04
