= Tommy McKinley =

Gaelic footballer

Tommy McKinley is a Gaelic footballer who played with Donegal. He won an Ulster U21 Title and played in the 2010 All-Ireland Under-21 Football Championship Final. He was called up to the Seniors when Jim McGuinness took over as manager and went on to win two Ulster and one All-Ireland Titles.
