= Tony Boyle (Gaelic footballer) =

Irish Gaelic footballer

Tony Boyle (born 1970) is an Irish former Gaelic footballer who played for An Clochán Liath and Donegal.

He is from Keadue. His father, Tony Boyle Snr, died in 2022, and his mother Kathleen died in 1997. From a family of seven, Tony Jnr has three sisters: Breda, Nicola and Karen. Tony Snr, Tony Jnr, Tony Snr's three brothers (John, Packie and Manus) and Tony Jnr's three brothers (Brendan, Danny and James) all played at the same time for Keadue Rovers.

He made 107 appearances for Donegal. He played for them from 1990 to 2001.

Aged 19, he made his championship debut as a 2nd half sub for Tommy Ryan v Armagh in the 1990 Ulster SFC final, won by Donegal. With the game tied (and via Barry McGowan), he found Manus Boyle, who scored a critical point.

A forward, he began at full-forward in the 1992 All-Ireland SFC Final, scoring 0–1 from play in the 0–18 to 0–14 win v Dublin. He and Noel Hegarty were the least experienced of Donegal's men on the pitch. He outplayed his opposite no 14 Vinnie Murphy. He only came into the team for the Ulster semi-final against Fermanagh.

He made a substitute appearance in Mickey Moran's first game in charge of Donegal, a league win at home to Offaly in October 2000.

He managed under-16 and minor ladies' teams for his club. And the seniors. He, with Tommy Ryan, was part of John Joe Doherty's backroom team when Doherty managed Donegal.

== Honours ==
- All-Ireland Senior Football Championship: 1992
- Ulster Senior Football Championship: 1990, 1992
- Donegal All-County League Champions: 1996, 2001
- All Star: 1992
- In May 2012, the Irish Independent named him as part of Donegal's "greatest team" spanning the past 50 years.
- Silver Jubilee Football Team of the Ulster GAA Writers Association (UGAAWA) nomination: 2012
