= Declan Walsh =

Donegal Gaelic footballer

Personal information
- Native name: Déaglán Breathnach (Irish)
- Born: 1989 (age 36–37) Letterkenny, Ireland
- Height: 1.81 m (5 ft 11 in)

Sport
- Sport: Gaelic football
- Position: Right half back
Clubs
- Years: Club
- 2006–2018 2019–: Malin; Doohamlet
Inter-county
- Years: County
- 2011–2018: Donegal
Inter-county titles
- Ulster titles: 3
- All-Irelands: 1

Declan Walsh (born 1989) is an Irish Gaelic footballer who played for Malin (the northernmost GAA club in Ireland) and the Donegal county team.

He was part of the Donegal team that won the 2012 All-Ireland Senior Football Championship. He later transferred to a club in Monaghan.

== Early life ==
Walsh's father was prominent in his local GAA club. He recalls his father coaching underage teams. As a young fella he played traditional music in one or two All Ireland Fleadhs.

== Playing career ==
Walsh won the 2006 Ulster Minor Football Championship with Donegal.

He played for Donegal throughout the Ulster Under-21 Football Championship in 2010, a competition which Donegal won, and in the semi-final of which (against Derry), Walsh scored a point. He then played in the final of the 2010 All-Ireland Under-21 Football Championship, which Donegal (managed by Jim McGuinness) narrowly lost to Dublin (managed by Jim Gavin).

Himself, Antoin McFadden, James Carroll and Eamonn Doherty transferred to Boston for the summer in 2011.

Walsh started for Donegal in their 2012 Ulster Senior Football Championship match against Cavan. When Neil McGee sustained an injury after two minutes against Tyrone in the semi-final, Walsh came on as a substitute to help his team through to the final. Walsh also made a substitute appearance against Cork in the All-Ireland semi-final, which Donegal won.

Against Tyrone in the 2013 All-Ireland Senior Football Championship he was concussed.

He made a substitute appearance in the 2015 All-Ireland Senior Football Championship qualifier defeat of Galway at Croke Park.

As of 2019, Walsh had transferred to a club in Monaghan.

== Honours ==
- All-Ireland Senior Football Championship: 2012
- Ulster Senior Football Championship: 2012, 2014
- All-Ireland Under-21 Football Championship runner-up: 2010
- Ulster Under-21 Football Championship: 2010
- Ulster Minor Football Championship: 2006
