= Peter Solan (Gaelic footballer) =

Irish Gaelic footballer

Peter Solan (born Peter Michael Anthony Solan; 1929 in Rinnaseer, Islandeady) was a Gaelic football corner forward who played for the Mayo county team and was involved in the county's All-Ireland Senior Football Championship (SFC) win over Louth in 1950, scoring the first goal in a match that Mayo won by two points.

Solan was again involved in the 1951 All-Ireland SFC-winning campaign, helping Mayo all the way to the final. In the Connacht final that year against Galway, he scored 3–1, going on then to score against Kerry in the semi-final. He was named as a sub for the final but did not appear in the team photo. Mayo has lost each of the eleven All-Ireland Finals it has appeared in since, the latest in 2021.

Peter Solan worked as a civil engineer, and was an accomplished traditional dancer and musician on several instruments as well as being fluent in the Irish language. He performed in Irish music events in Dublin, Nigeria and South Africa, where he married his wife Maureen in April 1959. The couple had five children who grew up in Ireland and South Africa.

Solan died in South Africa in January 1985 aged 55, after being diagnosed with cancer a few months earlier.
