= Joe Gilvarry =

Irish Gaelic footballer (1924-2004)

Personal information
- Native name: Seosamh Mac Giolla Bhearaigh (Irish)
- Nickname: Joko
- Born: 1924 Killala, County Mayo, Ireland
- Died: 18 September 2004 (aged 79) Killala, County Mayo, Ireland
- Occupation: Doctor
- Height: 5 ft 9 in (175 cm)

Sport
- Sport: Gaelic football
- Position: Left wing-forward
Club
- Years: Club
- Killala
Club titles
- Mayo titles: 0
College
- Years: College
- University College Dublin
College titles
- Sigerson titles: 1
Inter-county
Years	County	Apps (scores)
1945–1953	Mayo	20 (5–05)
Inter-county titles
- Connacht titles: 4
- All-Irelands: 2
- NFL: 1

Michael Joseph Gilvarry (1924 – 18 September 2004) was an Irish Gaelic footballer. He played for club side Killala and also lined out at inter-county level with the Mayo senior football team.

== Career ==
Gilvarry was a student at Blackrock College in Dublin, and captained the school's rugby union team to a Leinster Senior Cup title. Gilvarry subsequently attended University College Dublin and won a Sigerson Cup title in 1946. At club level, he played with the Killala club.

Gilvarry first appeared for Mayo in 1945. He won the first of four consecutive Connacht SFC titles in 1948, however, Mayo were later beaten by Cavan in the 1948 All-Ireland final. He claimed his first silverware the following year after victory in the National League. Gilvarry was one of the key forwards when Mayo claimed back-to-back All-Ireland SFC titles after defeats of Louth in 1950 and Meath in 1951. His inter-county performances also earned inclusion on the Connacht team, with Gilvarry winning a Railway Cup medal in 1951.

== Death ==
Gilvarry died on 18 September 2004, at the age of 79.

== Honours ==
University College Dublin

- Sigerson Cup: 1946

Mayo

- All-Ireland Senior Football Championship: 1950, 1951
- Connacht Senior Football Championship: 1948, 1949, 1950, 1951
- National Football League: 1948–49

Connacht

- Railway Cup: 1951
