= Henry Dixon (Gaelic footballer) =

Irish Gaelic footballer (1918-1999)

Personal information
- Native name: Anraí Mac Riocaird (Irish)
- Nickname: Henry the horse
- Born: 2 March 1918 Claremorris, County Mayo, Ireland
- Died: 29 December 1998 (aged 80) Tuam, County Galway, Ireland
- Occupation: Publican
- Height: 6 ft 0 in (183 cm)

Sport
- Sport: Gaelic football
- Position: Centre-back
Clubs
- Years: Club
- Carramore; Garrymore; Mayo Abbey; Claremorris
Club titles
- Mayo titles: 1
Inter-county
- Years: County
- 1947-1954: Mayo
Inter-county titles
- Connacht titles: 3
- All-Irelands: 2
- NFL: 2

Henry Patrick Dixon (2 March 1918 – 29 December 1998) was an Irish Gaelic footballer. He played with a number of clubs, including Garrymore and Claremorris, and also lined out at inter-county level with the Mayo senior football team.

== Career ==
Dixon's club career spanned four decades and four different clubs. After beginning his career with Carramore and Garrymore, he won a Mayo JFC title with Mayo Abbey in 1944. Dixon won a second junior title, this time with the Claremorris club, in 1960. He claimed a Mayo SFC medal with Claremorris in 1961 before bringing his club career to an end with a man of the match display in a defeat by Ballina Stephenites in 1962.

Dixon first appeared for Mayo in 1939, however, his emigration to England that year halted his inter-county progress. In 1944 he played with the Mayo junior team, while also making a few appearances for the senior team. Dixon was a non-playing substitute when Mayo were beaten by Cavan in the 1948 All-Ireland final. He became a regular member of the team the following year and claimed his first silverware after victory in the National League.

Dixon was at centre-back when Mayo claimed back-to-back All-Ireland SFC titles after defeats of Louth in 1950 and Meath in 1951. He continued to line out for Mayo until 1954. His inter-county performances also earned inclusion on the Connacht team, with Dixon winning a Railway Cup medal in 1951.

== Personal life and death ==
Dixon was born into a farming family just outside Claremorris in March 1918. He spent a number of years working in England g World War II. After returning home, Dixon opened his own pub in Claremorris in 1956.

Dixon died after a period of illness on 29 December 1998, at the age of 80.

== Honours ==
Mayo Abbey

- Mayo Junior Football Championship: 1944

Claremorris

- Mayo Senior Football Championship: 1961
- Mayo Junior Football Championship: 1960

Mayo

- All-Ireland Senior Football Championship: 1950, 1951
- Connacht Senior Football Championship: 1948, 1949, 1950, 1951
- National Football League: 1948–49, 1953–54

Connacht

- Railway Cup: 1951
