= Adrian Hanlon =

Irish Gaelic footballer

Personal information
- Born: 1980s
- Occupation: Plasterer
- Height: 5 ft 8 in (173 cm)

Sport
- Sport: Gaelic football
- Position: Forward
Clubs
- Years: Club
- ?–? ?–2014 2015– 2021–: Na Rossa; An Clochán Liath; Tír Chonaill Gaels; St Clarets
Inter-county
- Years: County
- 2009–2014: Donegal

Adrian Hanlon (born 1980s) is an Irish Gaelic footballer who plays for West London GAA club St Clarets and also, formerly, for the Donegal county team.

He was a panel member when Donegal won the 2012 All-Ireland Senior Football Championship.

== Biography ==
John Joe Doherty first invited Hanlon, a forward, to join the Donegal senior squad in 2009. That year he replaced Colm McFadden on McFadden's 100th championship appearance, which led to some controversy. Later that year he made a substitute appearance in the championship defeat to Cork at Croke Park, scoring a point.

Hanlon broke into the senior Donegal team during the 2011 National Football League and started the division 2 final against Laois. Donegal recorded victory, despite Adrian being sent off in the second half. He also played for Donegal in that year's championship opener against Antrim. Later dropped over a breach of discipline, Hanlon has since been included in senior Donegal squads again and was an unused substitute in the 2012 All Ireland victory over Mayo.

Hanlon played for Tír Chonaill Gaels between 2015 and 2017. He was the decider in the semi-final. His link-up with Killian Butler in the county semi-final 2017 was the decider between the sides.

As of 2021, Hanlon was playing for St Clarets of west London.

== Honours ==
Donegal

- All-Ireland Senior Football Championship: 2012
- Ulster Senior Football Championship: 2011, 2012
- National Football League Division 2: 2011

Tír Chonaill Gaels

- London Senior Football Championship: 2015
