= Packie Bonner =

Irish retired football goalkeeper

Pat Bonner
Personal information
- Full name: Patrick Joseph Bonner
- Date of birth: 24 May 1960 (age 66)
- Place of birth: Cloughglass, County Donegal, Ireland
- Position: Goalkeeper

Youth career
- 1975: Keadue Rovers
- 1977–1978: Finn Harps

Senior career*
Years	Team	Apps	(Gls)
1978–1997	Celtic	483	(0)

International career
1981–1996	Republic of Ireland	80	(0)
1990	Scottish League XI	1	(0)
- * Club domestic league appearances and goals

Patrick Joseph Bonner (born 24 May 1960) is an Irish retired footballer and coach. Commonly known as Pat or Packie, he played as a goalkeeper and spent his entire senior career at Scottish club Celtic.

He earned 80 caps for the Republic of Ireland after making his debut on his 21st birthday. He played in two European Championships and two World Cups. He also played Gaelic football for his native Donegal county team.

== Gaelic football ==
Bonner played Gaelic football for the Donegal county team at minor and senior level in the 1970s. He played a number of games in Ireland's National Football League (NFL).

== Club career ==
=== Early career ===
He began his soccer career in the late 1970s with his local youth side, Keadue Rovers. When he was 16 he had several trials with Leicester City and kept goal for them in the FA Youth Cup.

In August 1977, Bonner had agreed a deal to sign for League of Ireland side Finn Harps on a 6-month contract after impressing in a guest appearance in a friendly against English team Stoke City F.C. An agreement was put in place, with then Harps manager, Eunan "Busty" Blake, that if a bigger club came in, Bonner would be allowed to leave and Blake himself would personally tear up his contract. He was subsequently spotted by Sean Fallon, who was scouting in Ireland for Celtic, and invited to Glasgow for a trial. True to his word, Blake tore up Bonner's Finn Harps contract, without him ever making a competitive appearance for the club, and Bonner signed for Celtic on 14 May 1978.

=== Celtic ===
Bonner made 483 league appearances with Celtic, and is the goalkeeper with the most appearances in the club's history, with 646 overall. With Celtic he won four League Championships, three Scottish Cups and a League Cup. He was released by manager Lou Macari in 1994, but was re-signed by Tommy Burns after Macari was sacked. His last appearance for Celtic was winning the 1995 Scottish Cup final under Burns. After the Scottish Cup victory over Airdrie, Bonner took on the role of player-coach and finally left the club in 1998 to work as a coach alongside his former teammate Burns.

== International career ==
Bonner made his international debut for the Republic of Ireland on his 21st birthday in a friendly against Poland on 24 May 1981.

For the remainder of the Eoin Hand managerial era, Bolton Wanderers' Jim McDonagh remained Ireland's first choice goalkeeper. By the time of the appointment of Jack Charlton in March 1986, Bonner was already claiming the number one position. Bonner claimed his 75th international cap on his 34th birthday in a 1–0 win over Bolivia at Lansdowne Road which at the time equalled the Republic of Ireland record held by Liam Brady.

=== Euro 1988 ===
Bonner played in seven of Ireland's eight games in the qualifying round of UEFA Euro 1988. Despite some good results, including a 1–0 win away to Scotland, a 2–0 win at home to Bulgaria and a 2–2 draw away to World Cup bronze medalists Belgium, Ireland looked to be losing out on goal difference to Bulgaria. Bulgaria needed only a draw against Scotland in their last match to progress. However, a last-minute winning goal for Scotland gave Ireland, and Bonner, a first appearance at the UEFA European Championship.

Bonner played in all of Ireland's games at Euro 88, including the 1–0 victory over England in Stuttgart. Ireland scored early and dominated in the first half, missing several chances to put the game beyond England. However, in the second half, Bonner produced a number of outstanding saves to keep Ireland in the lead, most notably from Gary Lineker, and was named Man of the Match. It was Bonner's eighth consecutive clean sheet for Ireland. In the second game, Ireland drew 1–1 with the Soviet Union. Ireland narrowly missed out on a semi-final appearance, conceding a goal in the dying minutes of their final group match against eventual champions, the Netherlands.

=== 1990 World Cup ===
Bonner missed the opening qualifying game for the 1990 FIFA World Cup away to Northern Ireland due to a back injury. He played in the remaining seven fixtures, with the only goals being conceded throughout the qualifying campaign coming in a 0–2 loss in Spain. Indeed, only an excellent performance by Bonner in that game saved Ireland from a heavier defeat. Ireland went on to beat Spain 1–0 in the return fixture at Lansdowne Road, and in November 1989 clinched qualification in the final fixture with a 2–0 win away over Malta.

It was the first time the Republic of Ireland had qualified for the World Cup, and Bonner would make his mark on the world stage with two memorable moments that live long in Irish sporting folklore. The first was in Ireland's very first World Cup finals game, against England. With Ireland 1–0 down late in the game, Bonner delivered a determined clearance all the way to the English penalty area, setting up Kevin Sheedy's equaliser. While Bonner's role in the goal itself was minimal, the look of sheer determination on his face has been remembered as one of the defining moments of Ireland's inaugural appearance in the tournament. After a disappointing 0–0 draw with Egypt in the second game, Ireland needed at least a draw with the Netherlands to ensure passage to the next round. With Ireland 1–0 down midway through the second half, Bonner once again delivered a clearance all the way to the Dutch penalty area, which caused enough confusion to allow Niall Quinn to slot in the equaliser and send Ireland to the knockout stage. Ireland's second round fixture against Romania went to a penalty shootout, where the score was tied at 4–4 with one kick remaining for each team. Bonner made a simple save from a poorly taken penalty by Daniel Timofte, setting up David O'Leary to score the winning Irish kick. In the quarter-final against Italy, Ireland lost 1–0 as Bonner saved a powerful shot from Roberto Donadoni, but was knocked off balance enough to allow Salvatore Schillaci to snatch the winning goal and send Ireland home. Bonner arrived home in Dublin to a hero's welcome the following day.

Bonner's penalty save has been remembered by FIFA as one of the great moments of that World Cup. In an article entitled "Bonner's Moment in Time", Bonner states, "It really wouldn't be an exaggeration to say that that one save changed my life forever, certainly in terms of recognition."

=== Euro 1992 ===
Bonner remained Ireland's number one choice goalkeeper for UEFA Euro 1992, where Ireland was drawn against Poland, Turkey and England in the qualifying round. Ireland lost out to England in controversial circumstances. With Ireland one point behind England and tied with Poland with two games left, it was debated in the media if a draw with Poland would be better than a win. Assuming England beat Turkey on the same day, a draw left Ireland and Poland with six points each with England on eight points and all three teams having one remaining game. With England playing Poland in the last game, it meant that Poland could still qualify for the tournament by beating England and hoping Ireland failed to beat Turkey in their last game. If Poland did beat England, Ireland could then qualify on goal difference by beating Turkey. However, if instead, Ireland beat Poland in the second-last game, Poland was out of the tournament. Ireland would have seven points to England's eight, meaning that Ireland would need to beat Turkey and hope that Poland, without the prospect of qualification, could still manage a draw with England. With Ireland leading Poland 3–1 with minutes to go, Ireland conceded two late goals and the game finished 3–3.

In those final games Poland did hold England to a draw (1–1) and Ireland did beat Turkey 3–1, but England qualified with 9 points to Ireland's 8 points.

=== 1994 World Cup ===
Bonner represented Ireland in all 12 qualifying matches for the 1994 FIFA World Cup. Ireland seemed well on the way to qualification after seven wins and three draws in the opening ten games. With each side having only two games remaining, Ireland led the group on 18 points, ahead of Denmark on 16, with Spain in third place on 15 points. Ireland needed only a draw at Lansdowne Road against Spain in the second last game to guarantee qualification, while a win would virtually guarantee top position in the group. However, Ireland conceded three goals in a 15-minute spell in the first half, and despite a late consolation goal, subsequently needed to beat Northern Ireland in the last game to guarantee a place in the finals. A draw would mean Ireland needed the Spain-Denmark game, happening simultaneously, to finish in a win for one of the two sides. Ireland drew 1–1 with Northern Ireland but qualified ahead of Denmark by virtue of having scored more goals (they were level on goal difference), as Denmark lost 1–0 to Spain.

In the Finals, Ireland beat Italy 1–0 in their opening match. The euphoria was elevated by the fact that Ireland had also beaten Germany and the Netherlands in warm-up games. However, from that point on, the tournament was a disappointment for Ireland and especially Bonner. A 2–1 defeat at the hands of Mexico and a 0–0 draw with Norway were just enough for Ireland to move into round two on the strength of their win over Italy. A 2–0 defeat to the Netherlands ended Ireland's tournament, and was a low point for Bonner. With Ireland already 1–0 down late in the first half, a long-distance effort from Wim Jonk should have been an easy save. However, Bonner fumbled the shot and it dribbled into the net. Ireland never recovered and was eliminated from the tournament.

=== Euro 1996 qualification campaign ===
Bonner struggled to maintain his place in the Ireland squad during the UEFA Euro 1996 qualification campaign, playing only one match, as captain, in a 4–0 win over Liechtenstein at Lansdowne Road. Alan Kelly played all of Ireland's other qualification matches. Ireland were eliminated 2–0 by the Netherlands in a playoff.

=== Legacy ===
Bonner became the Republic of Ireland's most capped goalkeeper with 80 appearances for his country. He held this record until it was surpassed in 2007 by fellow Donegal native Shay Given who, by his retirement in 2016, had achieved 134 caps.

=== Coaching role ===
On 2 February 2003, following the promotion of Brian Kerr to the position of Republic of Ireland team manager, Bonner was named as technical director of the Football Association of Ireland (FAI). He previously held the role of the senior squad's goalkeeping coach in the organisation. In addition, he has worked as a football presenter with TV3.

== Personal life ==
Bonner is married to Ann and has two children. His son Andrew was also a footballer who played as a striker for the Republic of Ireland youth teams and in the Scottish Junior leagues at club level, and was later an amateur distance runner.

His twin brother Denis played football in Ireland for Galway United and Finn Harps. He also has five sisters.

== Career statistics ==
=== International ===
Republic of Ireland
Year	Apps	Goals
1981	1	0
1982	1	0
1983	1	0
1984	2	0
1985	4	0
1986	5	0
1987	6	0
1988	7	0
1989	8	0
1990	11	0
1991	7	0
1992	7	0
1993	9	0
1994	9	0
1995	0	0
1996	2	0
Total	80	0

== Honours ==
Celtic

- Scottish Premier Division (5): 1978–79, 1980–81, 1981–82, 1985–86, 1987–88
- Scottish Cup (5): 1979–80, 1984–85, 1987–88, 1988–89, 1994–95
- Scottish League Cup (2): 1982–83, 1997–98

Individual

- Ballon d'Or: 1989 (17th place)

== See also ==
- List of people on the postage stamps of Ireland
- List of one-club men in association football
