= Raymond Sweeney =

Irish Gaelic footballer

Personal information
- Born: County Donegal

Sport
- Sport: Gaelic football
- Position: Full Back
Club
- Years: Club
- ?–?: An Clochán Liath
Inter-county
Years	County	Apps (scores)
1997–2010	Donegal	96 (0–0)
Inter-county titles
- Ulster titles: 0
- All-Irelands: 0
- NFL: 0
- All Stars: 0

Raymond Sweeney is an Irish former Gaelic footballer who played for An Clochán Liath and the Donegal county team.

He started the first game of Brian McEniff's last spell as Donegal manager, a league defeat to Galway in Tuam in February 2003.

Sweeney was sent off in Donegal's 2003 All-Ireland Senior Football Championship semi-final against Armagh at Croke Park, in an incident later described as "one of the great injustices in Donegal football" history.

He had also started Mickey Moran's first game in charge of Donegal, a league win at home to Offaly in October 2000.

Sweeney made his championship debut against Antrim in 1998. He missed Donegal's National Football League in 2007 after leaving the squad at the end of the previous season due to a disagreement with the then manager Brian McIver. He also never won the Ulster Senior Football Championship during his career. However, he did win the 2009 Dr McKenna Cup with Donegal and the 2004 Railway Cup with Ulster. Sweeney retired from playing for Donegal in 2010 after more than a decade and 96 games.

His brother Adrian also played for An Clochán Liath and Donegal.

== Honours ==
Donegal

- All-Ireland Vocational Schools Championship: 1995
- Dr McKenna Cup: 2009

Ulster

- Railway Cup: 2004
