= Pat Shovelin =

- Born: 1975/6
- Died: 21 October 2017 (aged 41)
- Known for: Coaching Gaelic football
- Term: 2010–2017
- Awards: 2012 All-Ireland Champion

Pat Shovelin (1975/6 – 21 October 2017) was a Gaelic football coach from Ardara, County Donegal. He was goalkeeping coach for the Donegal county football team. He represented Ard an Rátha, his local club. Donegal won the 2012 All-Ireland Senior Football Championship final, becoming All-Ireland Champions, the highest achievement in the sport of Gaelic football.

As Donegal goalkeeping coach, Shovelin was responsible for the training of county netminders Paul Durcan and Michael Boyle. Shovelin considered Durcan to be as influential as Peter Schmeichel.

Shovelin graduated through the ranks with manager Jim McGuinness, with the pair previously working together with the Donegal under-21 football team. His style was that of "always-smiling and ever-mischievous".

Shovelin was with Donegal when they won the 2011 NFL Division 2 title at Croke Park in 2011. He was awarded medals on the basis of Donegal successes at senior and U21 levels.

Though diagnosed with liver cancer, he continued as part of the Donegal under-21 team that won an Ulster title in April 2017, and died that October.

== Personal life ==
He was married. His first child was born on the Wednesday before Donegal won the 2012 All-Ireland SFC final. He and Shay Given were close.
