= Mick Mulderrig =

Irish Gaelic footballer (1924-2004)

Personal information
- Native name: Mícheál Ó Maoildeirg (Irish)
- Born: 1931 Castlebar, County Mayo, Ireland
- Died: 4 June 2013 (aged 82) Rathfarnham, County Dublin, Ireland
- Height: 5 ft 9 in (175 cm)

Sport
- Sport: Gaelic football
- Position: Right corner-forward
Club
- Years: Club
- Ballina Stephenites
Club titles
- Mayo titles: 0
Inter-county
Years	County	Apps (scores)
1950–1955	Mayo	20 (5–05)
Inter-county titles
- Connacht titles: 3
- All-Irelands: 2
- NFL: 0

Michael G. Mulderrig (1931 – 4 June 2013) was an Irish Gaelic footballer. He played for club side Ballina Stephenites and also lined out at inter-county level with the Mayo senior football team.

== Honours ==
Mayo

- All-Ireland Senior Football Championship: 1950, 1951
- Connacht Senior Football Championship: 1950, 1951, 1955

Connacht

- Railway Cup: 1951
