= Colm McFadden =

Donegal Gaelic footballer

Personal information
- Native name: Colm Antóin Mac Pháidín (Irish)
- Born: 1983 (age 42–43) Letterkenny, Ireland
- Occupation: Deputy principal of St Eunan's College
- Height: 6 ft 2 in (188 cm)

Sport
- Sport: Gaelic football
- Position: Left corner forward
Club
- Years: Club
- ?–: St Michael's
College
- Years: College
- c. 2000–2003: NUIG
College titles
- Sigerson titles: 1
Inter-county
Years	County	Apps (scores)
2002–2016	Donegal	173 (25–438)
Inter-county titles
- Ulster titles: 3
- All-Irelands: 1
- NFL: 1
- All Stars: 1

Colm Anthony McFadden (Irish: Colm Antóin Mac Pháidín; born 1983) is an Irish Gaelic footballer who plays at full forward for St Michael's and, from 2002 to 2016, for the Donegal county team.

McFadden is Donegal's most-capped Championship player. He played an integral role in Donegal's successful 2011–14 run of matches, starting every Championship game in that period.

Among other accolades, he has one All Star to his name (2012), one All-Ireland Senior Football Championship title (2012), three Ulster Senior Football Championship titles (2011, 2012 and 2014) and one National Football League title (2007). Top scorer in the 2012 All-Ireland SFC, McFadden was subsequently shortlisted for the All Stars Footballer of the Year, but team-mate Karl Lacey was selected to receive that award. McFadden's haul of Ulster SFC titles was a joint county team record (alongside such past players as Anthony Molloy, Martin McHugh, Joyce McMullan and Donal Reid) for four years until Patrick McBrearty, Neil McGee, Paddy McGrath, Leo McLoone, Frank McGlynn, Michael Murphy and Anthony Thompson surpassed it in 2018.

A staff member of St Eunan's College in Letterkenny, McFadden has been deputy principal since 2019.

== Playing career ==
=== Club ===
McFadden's club have not had much success at senior level. They reached the final of the 2011 Donegal Senior Football Championship— their first ever senior final—but lost, though McFadden scored three points including one free.

Previously, in 2004, they reached the final of All-Ireland Intermediate Club Football Championship, in which McFadden played but was held scoreless.

McFadden's father was a coach at the club.

=== Inter-county ===
==== Youth ====
McFadden's father and older brother played football and encouraged his own interest. McFadden is left-footed (i.e. ciotóg). He played at older age grades from early on. He was a county player by under-16. Himself and Christy Toye, who was in his class at primary school and would later play alongside him many times for Donegal, played in (and won) the Ted Webb under-16 tournament, the same year they were part of the minor team. McFadden also played under-21 for his county while still playing as a minor. While at Galway, the then Donegal manager Mickey Moran noticed him. As well as being at university, McFadden was at this time in his third year at minor, leading Moran to assume McFadden was older. McFadden sat on the bench for a Donegal game in Tuam and did not play. After this, Moran approached McFadden and advised him to concentrate on playing with the minor team, telling him that he would be interested in reviewing McFadden's progress the following year.

==== Early years: 2002–2006 ====
"I only had him for a year. Moran was one of the coaches that I would have loved to have been coached by when I was older and more mature to appreciate the training he was doing. The training that he was doing was very good. It was all game-based".

— McFadden on Moran

Moran called McFadden into the senior squad the following year. His first start for Donegal came against Westmeath in Mullingar. McFadden later expressed regret at only experiencing Moran for one year as the manager soon left the role. It fell to Moran's successor Brian McEniff to give McFadden his first championship start.

McFadden made his senior championship debut for Donegal in 2002. That year, Donegal drew against Dublin by a scoreline of 0–14 to 2–8 in the All-Ireland Senior Football Championship quarter-final held on August Bank Holiday Monday, Dublin eventually winning the replay. He started the first game of Brian McEniff's last spell as Donegal manager, a league defeat to Galway in Tuam in February 2003, during which he scored two points. In the 2003 Championship, Donegal defeated Galway, the All-Ireland champions of two years previous, in the All-Ireland quarter-final replay at McHale Park in Castlebar. That victory qualified them for a semi-final against reigning All-Ireland Senior Football Champions Armagh, whom Donegal led with 14 men (after Raymond Sweeney was harshly sent off for a second yellow card) until a last minute penalty from Oisín McConville led to Donegal losing the game by a scoreline of 2–10 to 1–9. McFadden made a late substitute appearance for Brendan Devenney in that 2003 All-Ireland Senior Football Championship semi-final against Armagh. A pivotal game in McFadden's development occurred in the 2004 Championship, when McFadden scored 1–7 against Tyrone in Donegal's Ulster semi-final victory. Tyrone were the reigning All-Ireland champions and the Irish Examiner reported: "The new golden boy of Gaelic football, Colm McFadden, torpedoed the All-Ireland champions with a magical display of finishing". But Donegal did not do so well against Armagh in the final at Croke Park. And so ended the high points of McFadden's early inter-county career. He missed the 2006 Championship due to his studies in Liverpool, and a perceived lack of fitness on his part.

==== Middle years: 2007–2010 ====
McFadden would return to play a vital part in the Donegal team that won their first National Football League title in 2007. He scored three points in the final against Mayo. Donegal then defeated Armagh in the first round of the Ulster Senior Football Championship, only to lose to Tyrone in the next fixture.

In 2009, to McFadden's surprise, Donegal advanced to the All-Ireland Senior Football Championship quarter-finals, defeating 2001 champions Galway along the way. McFadden later suggested the arrival of Michael Murphy may have assisted.

McFadden was asked by Donegal County Board officials to receive a presentation on his 100th inter-county appearance, a presentation the player thought inappropriate in light of a bruising defeat in the Ulster Senior Football Championship during which he had been replaced by Adrian Hanlon, of all people. RTÉ's television cameras caught McFadden grinning ironically at the timing of such a request — but all irony was lost in the scramble to condemn the player's attitude. McFadden considered retiring amid all the furore, the misunderstanding, the calls for his head.

==== Later years: 2011–2016 ====
2011 brought the dawning of the Jim McGuinness managerial era, the most successful in the county's history. McFadden won his first Ulster title, scoring four points (including two frees) in the final against Derry. Donegal progressed to an All-Ireland semi-final that year.

2012 would prove to be McFadden's most successful season for Donegal. In helping Donegal to back-to-back Ulster titles in 2011–2012, McFadden became the first Donegal footballer to twice finish top scorer in the Ulster Championship. He scored six points in the final against Down. He scored an unusual goal in the seventh minute of Donegal's All-Ireland Senior Football Championship quarter-final defeat of Kerry at Croke Park, later describing it as "fortunate". He was also involved in the semi-final victory over Cork. Then he scored Donegal's second goal of the 2012 All-Ireland Senior Football Championship Final. Patrick McBrearty's attempt at scoring a point came crashing off the Mayo post after eleven minutes of the game, and Mayo's Kevin Keane fumbled, dropping the ball into the path of Colm McFadden who promptly slotted it into the back of the net. His goal helped Donegal win the Sam Maguire Cup and was part of a total of 1–4 (including three frees) which McFadden scored during the game. McFadden later added an All Star and was named 2012 Ulster GAA Player of the Year. However, he was unable to attend the Football Tour of New York. He was shortlisted for All Stars Footballer of the Year, but the award went to team-mate Karl Lacey.

McFadden made his 51st championship appearance against Derry in the Ulster quarter-final on 25 May 2014, a team record which had until then been held by Michael Hegarty. McFadden's appearance in the 2014 Ulster final against Monaghan was his 152nd overall for Donegal, second only to Brian Roper's 159, and McFadden won his third and final Ulster SFC at the end. He scored four points (all frees) in that final.

On 6 August 2016, McFadden announced he would be retiring from playing with Donegal following his team's exit from the 2016 All-Ireland Senior Football Championship against Dublin. He had made a late substitute appearance in that game, at Croke Park. He retired with a total of 173 appearances for Donegal. 64 of those appearances were in the championship, and he scored a county record 25–434. Or 438.

== Coaching career ==
In November 2022, it was announced that McFadden would be forwards coach of the Sligo senior footballers, under the management of Tony McEntee from January 2023.

In August 2023, McFadden was confirmed as being on the backroom team of Jim McGuinness, as McGuinness began his second spell as manager of the Donegal senior team.

== Education and work ==
McFadden was educated at St Eunan's College in Letterkenny. In 2000, he was part of the team that won the school's third McLarnon Cup, the first win since 1979. That 2000 final victory over St Columb's of Derry at Casement Park has been described as "arguably the match that catapulted him to people's attention outside of Donegal". He scored a late goal to give the college victory by a scoreline of 1–11 to 1–9, 1–8 of which McFadden scored himself. While completing his Leaving Certificate, McFadden was part of the under-17 Ireland international rules football team. His words of advice also helped the college to reclaim the McLarnon Cup in 2007, and to go on to compete in the All-Ireland "B" Colleges Final, which they subsequently lost.

Soon McFadden was off to the University of Galway, where he studied Financial Maths and Economics. There he won the All-Ireland Freshers and, two years after that, the Sigerson Cup, with the final held at Cork's Páirc Uí Rinn. He took his Postgraduate Certificate in Education at Liverpool Hope University, discussing football with a fellow teacher (and semi-professional footballer with a Conference team – name forgotten) during teaching practice at St Catherine's in Edge Hill.

McFadden began working as a teacher at his old secondary school, St Eunan's College, where the success of the 2012 Donegal team lifted the spirits of staff, including mathematical whiz Edward Harvey — seen on RTÉ with an enormous grin on his face at the end of the semi-final against Cork. McFadden told the Irish Examiner, "Eddie Harvey said to me last year when he was in the leisure centre, he'd pop into the jacuzzi and everyone would be talking doom and gloom and the recession. Last summer and this year too, he said he could go in there and all anyone would talk about was football. It's great to hear".

McFadden has also managed the school team. He was appointed as deputy principal of St Eunan's College in 2019.

== Personal life ==
McFadden's brother-in-law is his former Donegal teammate and manager, Jim McGuinness. He married Levina Wilkie. Their daughter Maisie was born in April 2012. Their son Matthew was born in June 2013.

McFadden is 6 ft 2 in (188 cm) and weighs 14 st 3 lb (90 kg).

McFadden has a brother who is eight years older than him. Another brother, Antoin, is also involved in sport. Antoin is seven years younger than Colm.

== Honours ==
Donegal

- All-Ireland Senior Football Championship: 2012
- Ulster Senior Football Championship: 2011, 2012, 2014
- National Football League Division 1: 2007

St Michael's

- All-Ireland Intermediate Club Football Championship runner-up: 2004
- Ulster Intermediate Club Football Championship: 2003
- Donegal Intermediate Football Championship: 2003

Individual

- All Star: 2012
  - Nominated in 2011, 2013
- Irish News Ulster Player of the Year: 2012
- The Sunday Game Team of the Year: 2012
- Ulster GAA Writers Monthly Merit Award: June 2004
- Ulster GAA Writers Association (UGAAWA) Footballer of the Year: 2012
