= Adrian Sweeney =

Irish Gaelic footballer

Personal information
- Born: County Donegal
- Height: 5 ft 10 in (178 cm)

Sport
- Sport: Gaelic football
- Position: Full Forward
Clubs
- Years: Club
- ?–? pre-2009 2023-present: Dungloe; Donegal Boston; Na Rossa
Inter-county
Years	County	Apps (scores)
1996–2008	Donegal	136 (16–292)
Inter-county titles
- NFL: 1
- All Stars: 1

Adrian Sweeney is an Irish former Gaelic footballer who played for Dungloe and the Donegal county team.

Considered one of the finest forwards of his generation, he often played alongside Brendan Devenney for Donegal.

Sweeney played for Donegal from 1996 to 2008, including a streak of 72 consecutive games between 1996 and 2003. He started the first game of Brian McEniff's last spell as Donegal manager, a league defeat to Galway in Tuam in February 2003, during which he scored two points (one of which was a free). He won an All Star in 2003, a year when Donegal made it to the All-Ireland Senior Football Championship semi-final in which he played and scored four points (including two frees). He played a crucial role in the team that won the county's first National League Division 1 title in 2007. Sweeney won an Ulster Under-21 Football Championship in 1995. However, he never won the Ulster Senior Football Championship. He did play in the 2004 Ulster final against Armagh at Croke Park. He also played in the 2006 Ulster final against the same opponents at the same venue, and scored three points but lost again.

He played for Donegal Boston.

His brother Raymond also played for Dungloe and Donegal.

== See also ==
- List of All Stars Awards winners (football)
