= John McAndrew (Gaelic footballer) =

Gaelic football player

Personal information
- Native name: Seán Mac Aindriú (Irish)
- Born: 8 July 1927 Bangor Erris, County Mayo, Ireland
- Died: 3 January 2013 (aged 85) Birmingham, England
- Occupation: Medical doctor
- Height: 191 cm (6 ft 3 in)

Sport
- Sport: Gaelic football
- Position: Left wing-back
Clubs
- Years: Club
- Crossmolina; John Mitchel's
Club titles
- Mayo titles: 1
Inter-county
- Years: County
- 1949-1960: Mayo
Inter-county titles
- Connacht titles: 2
- All-Irelands: 2
- NFL: 1

Seán Victor "John" McAndrew (8 July 1927 – 3 January 2013) was a Gaelic footballer. Born in the County Mayo town of Bangor Erris, he was one of the longest surviving Mayo Gaelic footballers to hold All-Ireland Senior Football Championship winners' medals. He was part of the 1950 and 1951 team, captained by Seán Flanagan, that won titles back-to-back those years at Croke Park, Dublin.

== Biography ==
In the mid-1950s, McAndrew studied and graduated from the Royal College of Surgeons in Dublin.

After emigrating to England in 1961, McAndrew led John Mitchel's Gaelic football team in Birmingham to several Warwickshire Senior Championships.

McAndrew's first medical practice in England was in the rural Shropshire town of Madeley (close to Ironbridge), where he joined the practice of Dr. McGabhann. McAndrew became involved in the local community and attended St. Mary's Catholic Church in Madeley, Shropshire. After a short period there, he saw an opportunity to take over a practice in the Sandwell town of Old Hill, near Cradley Heath. It was here, and for over 40 years, that McAndrew ran a his own practice.

Taking up the hobby of greyhound racing, both at NGRC and independent tracks, McAndrew gained a reputation for his astuteness in selecting young dogs from Ireland. Amongst the accolades he collected were the Birmingham Cup, ran at the old Perry Barr Greyhound Stadium, and the Welsh and Bolton St Legers.

McAndrew married Bridget Catherine Corr on 11 April 1971 and had a son in December 1973. His wife died on 23 May 2006.

== Gaelic football achievements ==
Ireland

- Winner of two Senior All Ireland Gaelic Football medals with Mayo in 1950 and 1951
- Winner of one Junior All Ireland Gaelic Football medal with Mayo in 1957
- Captain of Mayo Senior team beaten by Dublin in the All Ireland Gaelic Football semi final in 1955
- Winner of four County Championship medals with Crossmolina, Castlebar, and Ballina in County Mayo
- Winner of one County Championship medal with The Westerners, Dublin
- Winner of five Senior Connaught Championships medals with Mayo
- Winner of two National Football League medals with Mayo

England

- Winner of seven Warwickshire Football Championships with John Mitchels GAA club in Birmingham
- Winner of four Birmingham City Council Park Trophy competitions with John Mitchels GAA club
- Winner of seven Fr Forde cups, and eight Senior Football League competitions with John Mitchels GAA club
- Dr John McAndrew was chosen as full-back on the Warwickshire team of the 20th Century
- Ex Chairman of the Warwickshire County Board
- Ex Chairman of John Mitchels GAA club
- Ex Captain of John Mitchels GAA club
- Life President of John Mitchels GAA club
- Honorary Vice-President of the Gaelic Athletic Association Provincial Council for Britain
