= Éamonn Mongey =

Irish Gaelic footballer

Personal information
- Native name: Éamonn Ó Mongaigh (Irish)
- Born: 1925 Castlebar, County Mayo, Ireland
- Died: 23 September 2007 (aged 82) Monkstown, Dublin, Ireland
- Occupation: Barrister

Sport
- Sport: Gaelic football
- Position: Midfield
Club
- Years: Club
- 1940s–1950s: Castlebar Mitchels
Inter-county
- Years: County
- 1941–1955: Mayo
Inter-county titles
- Connacht titles: 5
- All-Irelands: 2
- NFL: 2

Éamonn Mongey (1925 – 23 September 2007) was an Irish Gaelic footballer who played as a midfielder and as a centre-back at senior level for the Mayo county team.

A native of Castlebar, Mongey's family was steeped in the GAA. His father was president, vice-president and secretary of Castlebar Mitchels on different occasions in the early part of the last century, and his brother Finn was also county secretary for a period.

He won an interprovincial colleges championship in 1942, and at the age of 16 had his first outing for the Mayo senior team against Roscommon in a Connacht league that replaced the National League which had been suspended because of the War. He remained a regular member of the starting fifteen until his retirement following the conclusion of the 1955 championship. During that time he won two All-Ireland medals, five Connacht medals and two National League medals.

Mongey experienced a lengthy club career with Castlebar Mitchels, winning numerous county championship medals.

Having qualified as a barrister, Mongey was appointed Registrar of the High Court in Dublin and had a doctorate in law as well as a degree in public administration. He was also a member of the Rathmines and Rathgar Musical Society.

He wrote a regular column on Gaelic football for The Sunday Press for many years.
