= Antoin McFadden =

Irish Gaelic footballer

Personal information
- Native name: Antoin Mac Pháidín (Irish)
- Occupations: Strength and Rehabilitation Coach

Sport
- Sport: Gaelic football
Club
- Years: Club
- ?–: St Michael's
Inter-county
- Years: County
- 2011?–201?: Donegal
Inter-county titles
- All-Irelands: 1

Antoin McFadden (born c. 1989/1990) is an Irish Gaelic football coach and player who has played for St Michael's and the Donegal county team. Pronounced AN-tawn, his forename is derived from the name of Roman great antiquity origin.

== Playing career ==
McFadden made substitute appearances in the semi-final and final of the Ulster Under-21 Football Championship in 2010.

He then played in the final of the 2010 All-Ireland Under-21 Football Championship, which Donegal (managed by Jim McGuinness) narrowly lost to Dublin (managed by Jim Gavin).

After being appointed senior manager in late-2010, McGuinness called McFadden into his squad ahead of the 2011 Dr McKenna Cup.

Himself, Eamonn Doherty, James Carroll and Declan Walsh transferred to Boston for the summer in 2011.

McFadden reached, and played in, the final of the 2011 Donegal Senior Football Championship — the first senior final in his club's history — but lost.

== Coaching career ==
McFadden coached Newcastle West to the 2015 Limerick Senior Football Championship and also worked with the Limerick county team.

Antoin McFadden later moved to Melbourne. He began work as Strength and Rehabilitation Coach for the Australian Football League (AFL) on 1 May 2018.

The COVID-19 pandemic allowed McFadden to return to Ireland, and he played for his club in the 2020 Donegal Senior Football Championship after five years away (including time spent in America and Limerick).

McFadden had been due to join the Melbourne Demons until the pandemic forced him back. He joined the Donegal management team as strength and conditioning coach ahead of the 2021 season. Mattie Brady replaced him ahead of the 2022 season.

== Personal life ==
McFadden attended St Eunan's College in Letterkenny. His father has been a coach at the St Michael's club.

He is the younger brother of Colm McFadden. There is a seven-year age difference. Both McFaddens were part of the Donegal team that won the 2012 All-Ireland Senior Football Championship, though Antoin did not play in the final. His brother, Colm, scored Donegal's second goal in the tenth minute and contributed four more points to the winning total. Antoin McFadden also has another brother, fifteen years his senior.

== Honours ==
Donegal

- All-Ireland Senior Football Championship: 2012
- All-Ireland Under-21 Football Championship runner-up: 2010
- Ulster Senior Football Championship: 2012
- Ulster Under-21 Football Championship: 2010

St Michael's

- Donegal Senior Football Championship runner-up: 2011
