= Dungloe GAA =

Donegal-based Gaelic games club

CLG An Clochán Liath
- Founded: 1923
- County: Donegal
- Nickname: Rosses Men
- Colours: Red and White
- Grounds: Rosses Park
- Coordinates: 54°57′08.48″N 8°21′07.55″W

Playing kits
Standard colours

Senior Club Championships
	All Ireland	Ulster champions	Donegal champions
Football:	-	-	7

CLG An Clochán Liath is a GAA club based in Dungloe, a Gaeltacht town along the Wild Atlantic Way in west County Donegal, Ireland. The club fields both men's and ladies' teams at all age grades in Gaelic football, hurling, and camogie.

== History ==
The club was founded towards the end of the Irish Civil War in 1923. The first official formation meeting was held in the old RIC Barracks which was then newly-controlled by An Garda Síochana on the Barrack Brae of the town of Dungloe. There are only two known names who were officially present at the first meeting of the club, Garda O’Riordan, who was from Kerry, and a Sergeant Mulhall, who was from Laois.

Soon after its formation, An Clochán Liath won the Senior Club Football Championship for the first time in 1930, and one year later they became the first side to retain the trophy. The team competed in 6 county finals in 7 years from 1930 to 1936, winning four titles. This period coincided with the career of John "Hughie" O'Donnell. O'Donnell captained Donegal during their successful Ulster league campaigns in 1936 and 1937, which included a league match played in Dungloe.

An Clochán Liath would wait seventeen years before winning the senior championship again, as their bitter rivals in Gaoth Dobhair dominated the club scene in Donegal. The rivalry reached a violent peak during a Championship meeting between the two sides in 1957 when fights between supporters spilled onto the field during a championship replay when An Clochán Liath were leading leading to an abandonment. A bread boycott ensued over the following weeks where Gaoth Dobhair supporters refused to buy bread milled in the Rosses. The match was re-fixed in a neutral venue, where An Clochán Liath finally got the upper-hand over their rivals.

In total, An Clochán Liath have won the Donegal Senior Football Championship title on seven occasions, the last coming in 1958.

An Clochán Liath made it to the 2024 Donegal Senior Football Championship Final, only to lose out to St Eunan's.

The club has had two players selected to the All-Ireland SFC All Star team: All-Ireland winning full forward Tony Boyle in 1992 and Adrian Sweeney in 2003.

Three men who have represented An Clochán Liath have won All-Ireland Senior Football Championships: Tony Boyle, Adrian Hanlon, and Paddy Prendergast (for Mayo).

== Notable players ==
- Tony Boyle: 1992 All-Ireland SFC winner; two-time Ulster SFC winner (1990, 1992); All Star winner in 1992.
- Adrian Hanlon: member of 2012 All-Ireland SFC winning panel.
- Noel McCole: 123 appearances for Donegal. two-time Ulster SFC winner (1974, 1983).
- Mark Curran: Ulster SFC winner in 2024; Sigerson Cup winner with UCD in 2020.
- John "Hughie" O'Donnell (1910-1954): Four-time Donegal Club Championship winner (1930, 1931, 1933, 1936); first Donegal man to win the Sigerson Cup - back-to-back champion with UCD (1930, 1931); captain of the first Donegal team to play in Croke Park.
- Adrian Sweeney: 136 appearances for Donegal. All Star winner in 2003.
- Paddy Prendergast: Won All-Ireland Championship with Mayo in 1950 and 1951. Last surviving member of the 1951 "cursed" Mayo All-Ireland winning team.
- Gerard McElwee: Ulster SFC winner in 1974.
- Raymond Sweeney: All Star nominee in 2003.
