= Mayo GAA =

County board of the Gaelic Athletic Association in Ireland

- Irish: Maigh Eo
- Nickname(s): The Yew County; The Heather County; The Westerners
- Province: Connacht
- Dominant sport: Gaelic football
- Ground(s): MacHale Park, Castlebar
- County colours: Green Red

County teams
- NFL: Division 1
- NHL: Division 2B
- Football Championship: Sam Maguire Cup
- Hurling Championship: Christy Ring Cup
- Ladies' Gaelic football: Brendan Martin Cup

The Mayo County Board of the Gaelic Athletic Association (GAA) (Irish: Cumann Luthchleas Gael Coiste Maigh Eo) or Mayo GAA is one of the 32 county boards of the GAA in Ireland, and is responsible for Gaelic games in County Mayo and the Mayo county teams.

The county football team was the second from the province of Connacht to win an All-Ireland Senior Football Championship (SFC), following Galway, but the first to appear in the final. Mayo play in the Connacht Senior Football Championship. The team has won four All-Ireland Senior Football Championship titles: 1936, 1950, 1951 and 2026. They have also acquired a long-term record for reaching eleven All-Ireland SFC finals only to fall at the ultimate hurdle in 1989, 1996, 1997, 2004, 2006, 2012, 2013, 2016, 2017, 2020 and 2021. Mayo has won the greatest number of National Football League titles consecutively (six, from 1934 to 1939). Mayo was the longest serving team in Division 1 of the National Football League when relegated in 2020, having played there since 1997. In 2021, Mayo gained promotion, at the first attempt, back to Division 1 of the National League.

== Governance ==
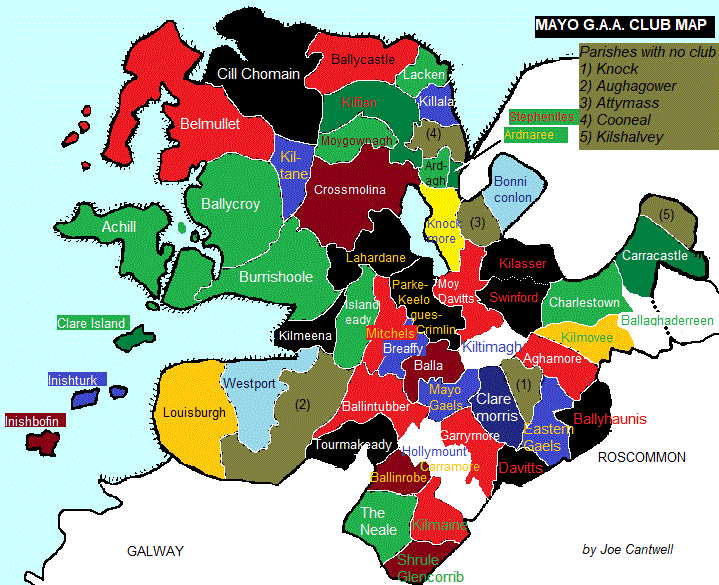
Mayo clubs

Hurling in Mayo is administered by the Mayo GAA Hurling Committee, which is a sub-committee of the Mayo GAA County Board.

The County Board's various financial problems have received extensive media coverage, as well as attention from Revenue, with GAA president Jarlath Burns attending a special meeting on the matter in May 2025.

The County Board received widespread criticism for the manner in which it sacked Kevin McStay in June 2025. Notable critics included RTÉ presenter Des Cahill, as well as former Mayo players Rob Hennelly and Lee Keegan.

== Football ==
=== Clubs ===
Clubs contest the Mayo Senior Football Championship.

Crossmolina Deel Rovers won the 2000–01 All-Ireland Senior Club Football Championship.

Ballina Stephenites won the 2004–05 All-Ireland Senior Club Football Championship.

=== County team ===
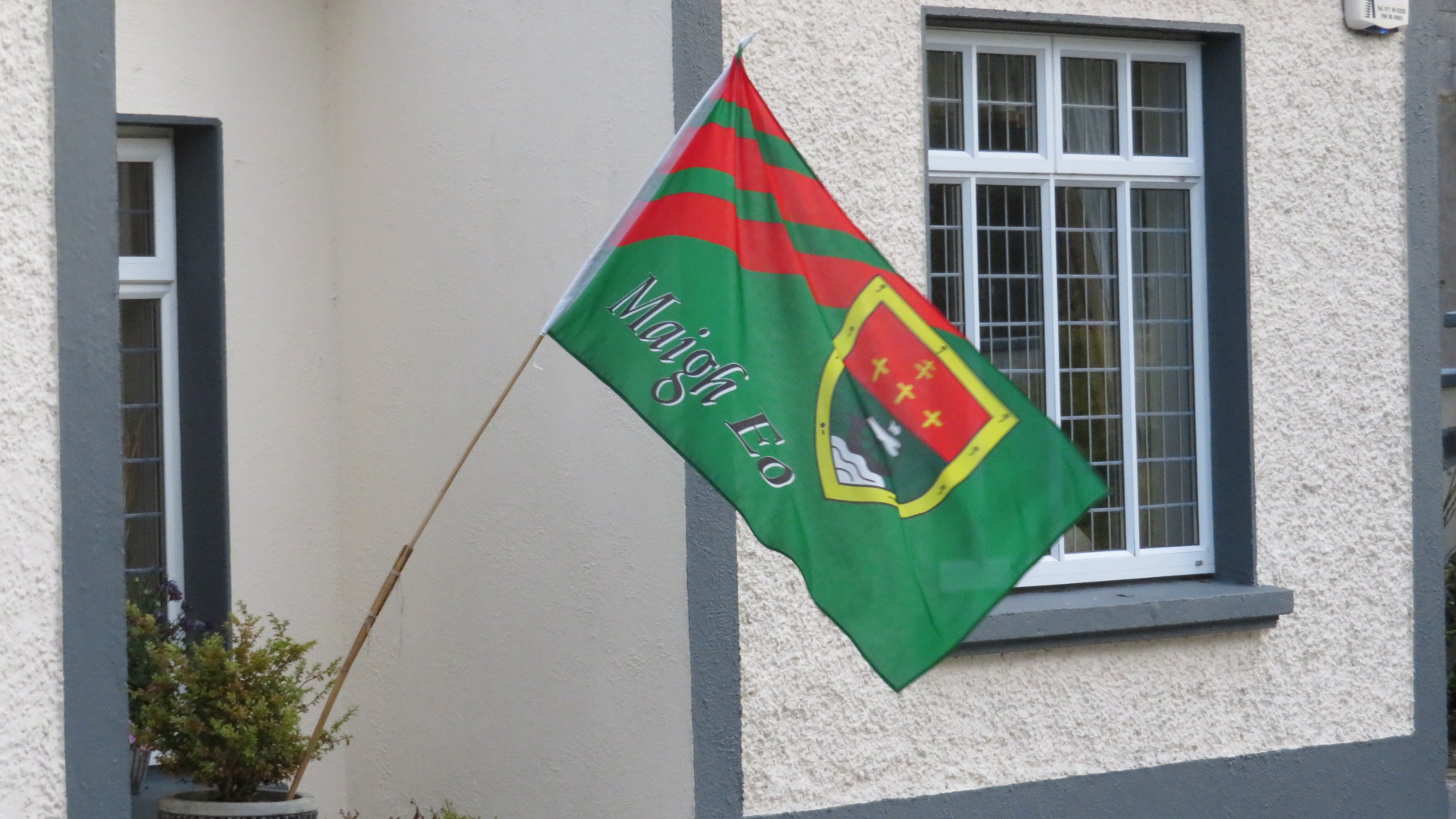
A Mayo flag flying on the day of the 2017 All-Ireland SFC final

Mayo are the current All-Ireland SFC champions after defeating Kerry in the 2026 All-Ireland final by 3 points.

The county team won its first All-Ireland Senior Football Championship (SFC) in 1936, defeating Laois in the final.

It won a second All-Ireland SFC in 1950, defeating Louth in the final. The team retained the All-Ireland SFC in 1951, defeating Meath in the final.

Mayo did not appear in another All-Ireland SFC final until 1989, losing to Cork.

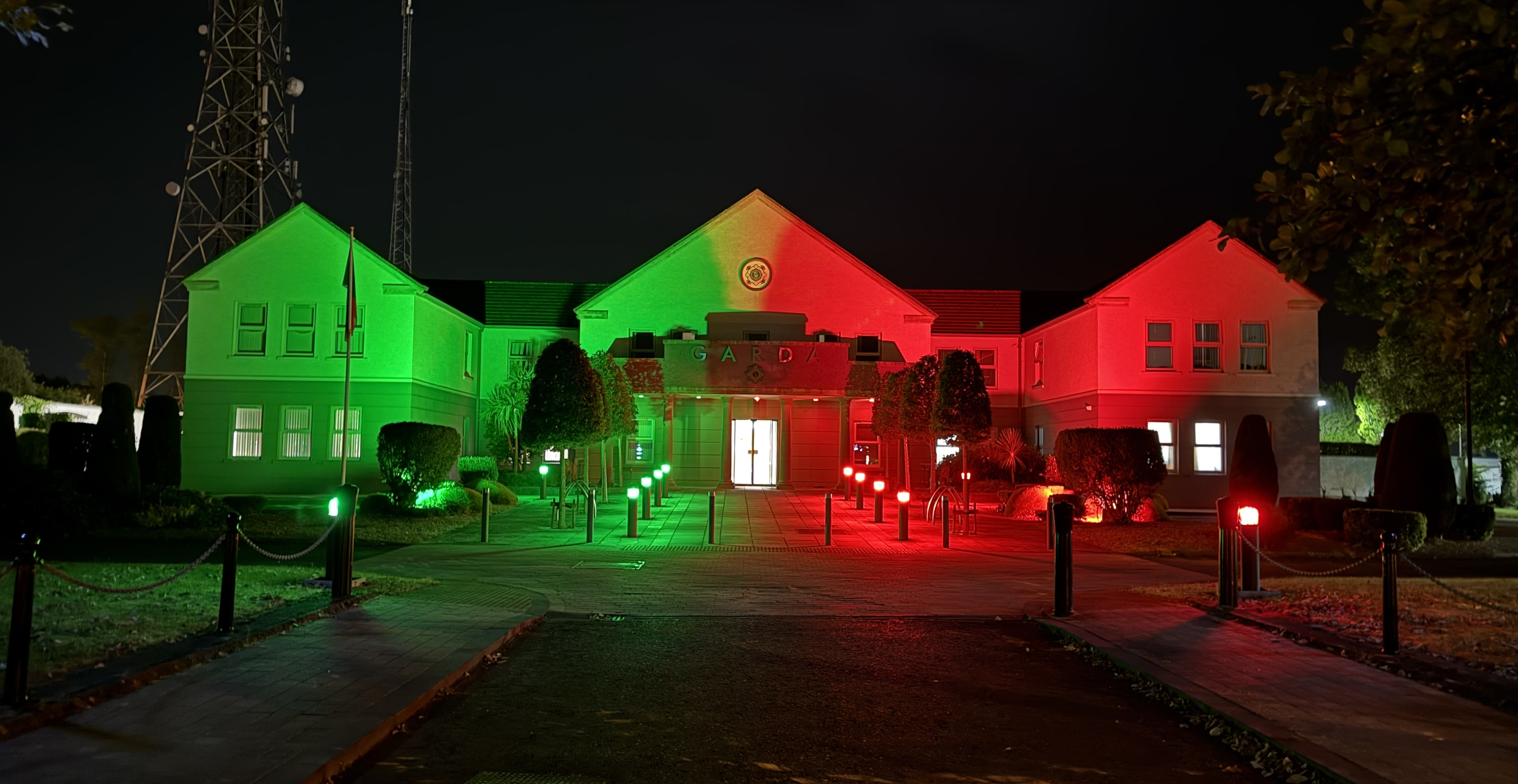
Castlebar Garda station illuminated in the Mayo colours after the 2026 All-Ireland Football championship win.

Since 1989, the team has appeared in (and lost) All-Ireland SFC finals in 1996 (drawn game and reply), 1997, 2004, 2006, 2012, 2013, 2016 (drawn game and replay), 2017, 2020 and 2021. Four of those were one-point losses: 1996 (replay), 2013, 2016 (replay) and 2017.

Mayo scored 21 points to Dublin's nine in the 2016 drawn game but two of the scores were own goals by Mayo players. In 2020, Mayo conceded the fastest goal in the history of All-Ireland SFC finals, knocking more than twenty seconds off a record which had stood for 58 years. In the 2021 loss, Ryan O'Donoghue hit a penalty against the goalpost and numerous other goal chances were squandered. A curse is said to be upon the Mayo football team.

== Hurling ==
=== Clubs ===
Although not a traditional hurling county, hurling is strong in certain parts of the county especially in the eastern region around Ballyhaunis and Tooreen. Mayo has four senior hurling clubs, each of which competes against the others annually for the TJ Tyrell Mayo Senior Hurling Championship. These four clubs are Tooreen, Ballyhaunis, Castlebar Mitchels and St. Ciaran. Tooreen has won all championships since 2021 and has the most titles with 35. Additionally 9 teams are competing in the Junior hurling championship in 2026.

At underage level up to 10 clubs are competing in leagues and championships in the county.

=== County team ===
The senior clubs provide players for the Mayo senior hurling panel, which participates in the National Hurling League and the All-Ireland Nicky Rackard Cup (Tier 4).

Mayo won the Nicky Rackard Cup in 2016, defeating Armagh by a scoreline of 2–16 to 1–15 at Croke Park and in 2021, defeating Tyrone by 2-27 - 1-14.

The ten underage clubs provide players for the Mayo underage hurling development panels. Mayo has development panels at under-14, under-15, under-16 and minor age-groups, and competes in the All-Ireland 'B' competitions each year.

The Mayo under-21 hurling team competes in the Connacht U-21B Hurling Championship each year alongside Leitrim, Roscommon and Sligo.

== Camogie ==
Under Camogie's National Development Plan 2010–2015, "Our Game, Our Passion", Donegal, Kerry, Mayo and Monaghan were to get a total of 14 new clubs by 2015. Na Brídeoga won the Coiste Chontae an Chláir Shield at Féile na nGael in 2009, Parke (1983) and Ardagh (1988) had previously won divisional honours.

The county hosted the 2007 Máire Ní Chinnéide Cup. It once contested an All-Ireland SCC final.

Mayo formed a camogie team again in 2021 after an absence of many years, but decided not to field an adult team in 2025. The side had been affected by heavy defeats, including one particularly severe 2024 home game loss against Cavan when they conceded 4 goals and 19 points. In January 2025, local media reported on months-long difficulties in finding a manager for the team, with the situation becoming so desperate that those involved were willing to accept "anybody who might be interested at this stage, even if they aren't from a strictly camogie background".

By the end of February 2025, Mayo had disbanded its camogie team.

However, in 2026 they competed again in both the National Camogie League where they won division 3B as in the All Ireland Junior Championship.

== Club roll of honour (since 1951) ==
Year	Senior	Intermediate	Junior	U21	Minor	Hurling	Ladies Senior Football	Camogie
1951	Castlebar Mitchels		Charlestown Sarsfields		Swinford	Charlestown Sarsfields		St Mary's (Westport)
1952	Castlebar Mitchels		Ardnaree Sarsfields		Ballyhaunis	Castlebar Mitchels		St Mary's (Westport)
1953	Castlebar Mitchels		Charlestown Sarsfields		Charlestown Sarsfields	Ballaghaderreen		St Aodhan's (Islandeady)
1954	Castlebar Mitchels		Ballintubber		Castlebar Mitchels	Castlebar Mitchels		St Aodhan's (Islandeady)
1955	Ballina Stephenites		Crossmolina Deel Rovers		Castlebar Mitchels	Castlebar Mitchels		Manulla
1956	Castlebar Mitchels		St Coman's		Carras	Swinford		Manulla
1957	East Mayo		Ballyhaunis		Ballina Stephenites	Belmullet		Manulla
1958	Ballyhaunis		Ballinrobe		Ballina Stephenites	Ballina Stephenites		Manulla
1959	Castlebar Mitchels		Ardnaree Sarsfields		Carras	Ballina Stephenites		Manulla
1960	West Mayo		Claremorris		Ballina Stephenites	Manulla		Achill (final played in 1962)
1961	Claremorris		Garrymore		Ballinrobe	Manulla		Achill (final played in 1962)
1962	Castlebar Mitchels		Crossmolina Deel Rovers		Belmullet	Westport		Newport
1963	Castlebar Mitchels		Charlestown Sarsfields		Claremorris	Moy Slashers		Newport–Ballina
1964	Claremorris		Hollymount		Claremorris	Westport		Islandeady
1965	Claremorris	Garrymore	Achill		Achill	Cong		Achill
1966	Ballina Stephenites	Burrishoole	Breaffy		Aghamore	Tooreen		Castlebar
1967	East Mayo	Ballyhaunis	Kiltimagh		Ballina Stephenites	Cong		
1968	North Mayo	Kilmaine	Ballaghaderreen		Ballaghaderreen	Claremorris		Breaffy
1969	Castlebar Mitchels	Garrymore	Aghamore		Claremorris	Westport		Claremorris
1970	Castlebar Mitchels	Aghamore	Westport	Kiltimagh	Kiltimagh	Westport		Breaffy
1971	Claremorris	Ballaghaderreen	Ardnaree Sarsfields	Claremorris	Kiltimagh	Claremorris		Breaffy
1972	Ballaghaderreen	Knockmore	Kiltane	Ballaghaderreen	Claremorris	Tooreen		Breaffy
1973	Knockmore	Kiltane	Belmullet	Claremorris	Carras	Ballinrobe		
1974	Garrymore	Belmullet	Islandeady	Claremorris	Carras	Tooreen		
1975	Garrymore	Islandeady	Crossmolina Deel Rovers	Charlestown Sarsfields	St Gerard's (Hollymount)	Tooreen	Claremorris	
1976	Garrymore	Ballintubber	Parke	Ballintubber	St Gerard's (Hollymount)	Ballinrobe	Claremorris	
1977	Shamrocks	Kilmaine	Kilmeena	Davitts	Claremorris	Ballinrobe	Islandeady	
1978	Castlebar Mitchels	Kiltimagh	Bonniconlon	Hollymount	Ballinrobe	Tooreen	Islandeady	
1979	Garrymore	Ballinrobe	Tourmakeady	Hollymount	Ballina Stephenites	Tooreen		
1980	Knockmore	Crossmolina Deel Rovers	Balla	Ballina Stephenites	The Neale	Tooreen		
1981	Garrymore	Davitts	Parke	Aghamore	Claremorris	Tooreen		
1982	Garrymore	Tourmakeady	Carramore	Castlebar Mitchels	Castlebar Mitchels	Tooreen	Tourmakeady	
1983	Knockmore	Parke	Achill	Castlebar Mitchels	Ballina Stephenites	Tooreen	Cong	
1984	Knockmore	Mayo Gaels	Kilmaine	Davitts	Crossmolina Deel Rovers	Tooreen	Tourmakeady	
1985	Ballina Stephenites	Kilmaine	Islandeady	Davitts	Claremorris	Tooreen	Hollymount	
1986	Castlebar Mitchels	Bonniconlon	Kilmeena	Davitts	Castlebar Mitchels	Tooreen	Hollymount	
1987	Ballina Stephenites	Swinford	Louisburgh	Moy Davitts	Knockmore	Tooreen	Hollymount	
1988	Castlebar Mitchels	Ballyhaunis	Charlestown Sarsfields	Claremorris	Charlestown Sarsfields	North Mayo	Hollymount	
1989	Knockmore	Hollymount	Kilmaine	Castlebar Mitchels	Balla	Tooreen	Hollymount	
1990	Hollymount	Ballintubber	Islandeady	Ballintubber	Kiltimagh	Tooreen	Hollymount	
1991	Hollymount	Kiltimagh	Achill	Charlestown Sarsfields	Knockmore	Tooreen	Hollymount	
1992	Knockmore	Burrishoole	Kilmaine	Crossmolina Deel Rovers	Crossmolina Deel Rovers	Tooreen	Hollymount	
1993	Castlebar Mitchels	Charlestown Sarsfields	Kilmeena	Knockmore	Crossmolina Deel Rovers	Tooreen	Kiltimagh	
1994	Hollymount	Swinford	Louisburgh	Knockmore	Castlebar Mitchels	Tooreen	The Neale	
1995	Crossmolina Deel Rovers	Louisburgh	Achill	Ballina Stephenites	Claremorris	Tooreen	The Neale	
1996	Knockmore	Moy Davitts	Breaffy	Castlebar Mitchels	Claremorris	Ballina Stephenites	Hollymount	
1997	Knockmore	Bonniconlon	Parke	Crossmolina Deel Rovers	Swinford	Tooreen	Hollymount	
1998	Ballina Stephenites	Mayo Gaels	Tourmakeady	Moy Davitts	Kilmaine	Tooreen	Carnacon	
1999	Crossmolina Deel Rovers	Swinford	Belmullet	Charlestown Sarsfields	Ballina Stephenites	Tooreen	Hollymount	
2000	Crossmolina Deel Rovers	Ballinrobe	Killala	Ballinrobe	Ballina Stephenites	Tooreen	Carnacon	
2001	Charlestown Sarsfields	Kiltimagh	Belmullet	Ballina Stephenites	Ballina Stephenites	Belmullet	Carnacon	
2002	Crossmolina Deel Rovers	Ballinrobe	Kilmeena	Knockmore	Castlebar Mitchels	Ballyhaunis	Carnacon	
2003	Ballina Stephenites	Louisburgh	Breaffy	Ballaghaderreen	Belmullet	Tooreen	Carnacon	
2004	Ballina Stephenites	Breaffy	Aghamore	Ballaghaderreen	Ballintubber	Ballyhaunis	Carnacon	
2005	Crossmolina Deel Rovers	Castlebar Mitchels	Kilcommon	Castlebar Mitchels	Knockmore	Ballyhaunis	Carnacon	
2006	Crossmolina Deel Rovers	Tourmakeady	Crossmolina Deel Rovers B'	Knockmore	Breaffy	Ballyhaunis	Carnacon	
2007	Ballina Stephenites	Ballintubber	Achill	Castelebar Mitchels	Castlebar Mitchels	Ballina Stephenites	Carnacon	
2008	Ballaghaderreen	Aghamore	Killala	Ballintubber	Knockmore	Ballyhaunis	Carnacon	
2009	Charlestown Sarsfields	Westport	Kiltimagh	Ballintubber	Castlebar Mitchels	Ballyhaunis	Carnacon	
2010	Ballintubber	Tourmakeady	Parke	Castlebar Mitchels	Ballina Stephenites	Ballyhaunis	Carnacon	
2011	Ballintubber	Davitts	Islandeady	Castlebar Mitchels	Ballina Stephenites	Ballyhaunis	Carnacon	
2012	Ballaghaderreen	Charlestown Sarsfields	The Neale	Castlebar Mitchels	Castlebar Mitchels	Ballyhaunis	Carnacon	
2013	Castlebar Mitchels	Kiltane	Kilcommon	Moy Davitts	Breaffy	Tooreen	Carnacon	
2014	Ballintubber	Ballyhaunis	Castlebar Mitchels B'	Claremorris	Moy Davitts	Ballyhaunis	Carnacon	
2015	Castlebar Mitchels	Hollymount–Carramore	Ardnaree Sarsfields	Aghamore	Claremorris	Ballyhaunis	Carnacon	
2016	Castlebar Mitchels	Westport	Louisburgh	Aghamore	Castlebar Mitchels	Ballyhaunis	Carnacon	
2017	Castlebar Mitchels	Moy Davitts	Lahardane	Westport	Balla	Tooreen	Carnacon	
2018	Ballintubber	Belmullet	Balla	Claremorris	Westport	Tooreen	Carnacon	
2019	Ballintubber	The Neale	Castlebar Mitchels B'	Westport	Knockmore	Tooreen	Carnacon	
2020	Knockmore	Balla	Kilmaine	Unplayed	Castlebar Mitchels	Ballyhaunis	Carnacon	
2021	Knockmore	Mayo Gaels	Kilmeena	Unplayed	Claremorris	Tooreen	Knockmore	
2022	Westport	Ballyhaunis	Islandeady	Unplayed	Moy Davitts	Tooreen	Burrishoole	
2023	Ballina Stephenites	Kilmeena	Lahardane MacHales	Castlebar Mitchels	Claremorris	Tooreen	Knockmore	
2024	Ballina Stephenites	Crossmolina	Cill Chomáin	Castlebar Mitchels	Castlebar Mitchels	Tooreen	Westport	
2025	Ballina Stephenites	Kilmeena	Kiltimagh	Claremorris	Crossmolina Deel Rovers	Tooreen	Westport	
