= List of people from Letterkenny =

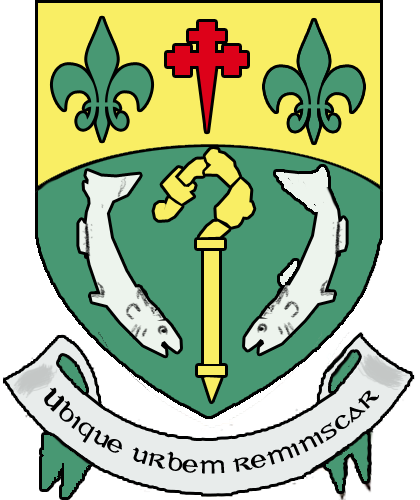

The following is a list of notable people who were born in, lived in for a significant length of time or are buried in Letterkenny, the largest town in County Donegal, Ireland.

== Arts ==
- Stopford Augustus Brooke – writer
- Jean Glover – entertainer
- Redmond Herrity – sculptor
- Gerard Lough – filmmaker
- Amybeth McNulty – actress
- John Nee – actor
- Paddy Tunney – singer

== Ecclesiastical ==
- Philip Boyce – Bishop of Raphoe (1995–2017)
- Séamus Hegarty – Bishop of Raphoe (1982–1994)
- William MacNeely – Bishop of Raphoe (1923–1963); oversaw the completion of the town's cathedral
- James Whyte – Third Roman Catholic Bishop of Dunedin, New Zealand (1920–1957)

== Media ==
- Richard Crowley – RTÉ reporter
- Shaun Doherty – Highland Radio broadcaster
- Declan Harvey - Journalist and main presenter of Newsline on BBC Northern Ireland; he is also a presenter on Evening Extra on BBC Radio Ulster.
- Enda McClafferty - Political Editor of BBC Northern Ireland; born and raised in Letterkenny, he now lives just outside St. Johnston
- Noel Slevin – Donegal Democrat journalist and Donegal on Sunday columnist

== Politics ==
- Harry Blaney – T.D.; brother of Neil; father of Niall
- Neil Blaney (known as "Neil T. Blaney") – T.D. and Minister; brother of Harry; uncle of Niall
- Niall Blaney – T.D.; son of Harry; nephew of Neil
- Ciaran Brogan – Politician
- Jimmy Harte – Politician
- Rev John Kinnear – M.P. and 1870s tenant rights campaigner
- Dessie Larkin – Mayor
- Don Lydon – Senator
- Seán Maloney – Politician
- Jim McDaid – T.D. and Minister
- Terry McEniff – Politician; businessman
- Ian McGarvey – Politician
- Dr JP Mc Ginley- TD and surgeon
- Bernard McGlinchey – Senator
- Joe McHugh – T.D. and Minister
- Gerry McMonagle – Politician
- John O'Donnell – Politician
- Walter Patterson – first British colonial governor of Prince Edward Island
- Norah Smyth (1874 – 1962) was a British suffragette, photographer and socialist activist who retired here

== Sport ==
- Tony Blake – Gaelic footballer
- Brendan Boyce – athlete and 2012 London Olympian
- Eddie Brennan – Gaelic footballer
- Martin Carney – Gaelic footballer and RTÉ Sport commentator
- Paul Carr – Gaelic footballer
- Jim Clarke – Gaelic footballer
- Daniel Collins – rower and national indoor rowing champion
- Gary Crossan – athlete
- Mark Crossan – Gaelic footballer
- Philip Deignan – cyclist and 2008 Beijing Olympian
- Brendan Devenney – Gaelic footballer
- Eamonn Doherty – Gaelic footballer
- Conall Dunne – Gaelic footballer
- Paul Durcan – Gaelic footballer
- Mark English – Olympic middle-distance runner; multiple European Athletics Championships medalist
- Sean Ferriter – Gaelic footballer
- Dale Gorman – association footballer
- Gareth Gorman – association footballer
- Ciara Grant – association footballer
- Ciaran Greene – Gaelic footballer and association footballer
- John Hannigan – Gaelic footballer
- John Haran – Gaelic footballer
- Seamus Hoare – Gaelic footballer
- Sinead Jennings – Olympian rower
- Rory Kavanagh – Gaelic footballer
- Karl Lacey – Gaelic footballer
- Conrad Logan – association footballer
- Christopher Malseed – association footballer
- Danny McDaid – Olympian; marathon champion
- Colm McFadden – Gaelic footballer
- Mark McGowan – Gaelic footballer
- Kevin McHugh – association footballer
- Denis McLaughlin – association footballer
- Patrick McMillan – alpine ski racer
- Seán McVeigh – hurler
- Cillian Morrison – Gaelic footballer and association footballer
- Conor Morrison – Gaelic footballer
- Charlie Mulgrew – Gaelic footballer
- Michael Murphy – Gaelic footballer
- Niall O'Donnell – Gaelic footballer
- Conor Parke – hurler
- Shaun Patton – Gaelic footballer and association footballer
- Kevin Rafferty – Gaelic footballer
- Tommy Ryan – Gaelic footballer
- Caolan Ward – Gaelic footballer
- Ross Wherity – Gaelic footballer and Australian rules footballer
- Joe Winston – Gaelic footballer

== Others ==
- Francis Alison (1705-1779) – founder of the University of Delaware
- Edward Boyce (1862-1941) – trade unionist
- Conrad Gallagher (born 1971) – chef
- Pat Gibson (born 1961) – quizzer; won the UK version of Who Wants to Be a Millionaire? (2004); won Mastermind (2005); won the BBC Radio 4 quiz show Brain of Britain (2006); won Mastermind Champion of Champions (2010); features as the Seventh Egghead on Eggheads
- Sheelagh Harbison (1914-2012) - Irish medieval historian
- Frank Larkin (1972-2020) – disability rights activist
- Redmond O'Hanlon (1640-1681) – outlaw

== See also ==
- List of people from County Donegal
