= List of people from County Donegal =

This is a list of people from County Donegal.

== Sport ==
- Packie Bonner, former Glasgow Celtic and Republic of Ireland goalkeeper
- Séamus Coleman plays right back for Everton and Republic of Ireland
- Daniel Collins, rower
- Philip Deignan, former professional cyclist
- Gary Doherty, former professional association football player
- Joseph Duffy, former UFC fighter and professional boxer
- John Dunleavy, Sligo Rovers F.C. centre-back
- Mark English, middle-distance runner
- Sharon Foley, international athlete
- Dave Gallaher, former New Zealand Rugby Union player and captain
- Shay Given, former Republic of Ireland and Newcastle United goalkeeper
- Caitriona Jennings, international athlete and Olympian
- Sinéad Lynch, Olympic rowing finalist
- Conrad Logan, Rochdale A.F.C. goalkeeper
- Brian McEniff, former Gaelic Athletic Association county manager
- Colm McFadden, Gaelic Football player
- Jim McGuinness, Gaelic football coach and former player
- Carl McHugh, ATK Mohun Bagan FC association football defender
- Kevin McHugh, Finn Harps F.C. under-15 manager
- Ronan McLaughlin, former professional cyclist
- Stephen McLaughlin, Mansfield Town F.C. winger
- Larissa Muldoon, Ireland women's Rugby Union scrum-half
- Michael Murphy, Gaelic Football player
- Jason Quigley, professional boxer
- Nora Stapleton, Ireland women's Rugby Union fly-half

== Religion ==
- Adomnán – also known as Saint Eunan; Abbot of Iona 679–704.
- Francis Alison – prominent Presbyterian minister in the Thirteen Colonies and a leading member of the Synod of the Trinity. At least three of the signatories of the United States Declaration of Independence were former students of Alison, who was born and raised in the Parish of Leck, on the outskirts of Letterkenny.
- Stopford Brooke – Anglican and, later, Unitarian clergyman and literary historian. He served as chaplain to The Crown Princess Friedrich of Prussia, 1863–1865, and later served as chaplain-in-ordinary to her mother, Queen Victoria, 1875–1880. Was born and raised in Glendowan, just west of Letterkenny.
- Columba – or Saint Colmcille, one of the three patron saints of Ireland.
- Michael Cardinal Logue, Catholic Primate of All Ireland and Archbishop of Armagh, 1887–1924. From Kilmacrennan, he was the first Donegal person to be created a cardinal.
- The Rev. Francis Makemie – founder of Presbyterianism in what later became the United States. He was from Ramelton.
- Patrick Cardinal O'Donnell, Catholic Primate of All Ireland and Archbishop of Armagh, 1924–1927. He was from Kilraine, just outside Glenties.
- George Simms – Church of Ireland Primate of All Ireland and Archbishop of Armagh. A well-known historian, he was from Lifford.

== Arts ==
=== Music ===
- Altan, folk band
- Moya Brennan, Celtic folk singer
- Clannad, folk band
- John Doherty, fiddler
- Enya, singer
- Aoife Ní Fhearraigh, singer
- Rory Gallagher, blues/folk guitarist and singer
- Conal Gallen, singer
- Mickey Joe Harte, singer/songwriter
- George Houston, singer/songwriter
- Danny Hutton, singer/songwriter, Three Dog Night
- Mairéad Ní Mhaonaigh, fiddler
- Lee Mulhern, singer/songwriter, member Of Stateside
- Daniel O'Donnell, singer
- Margo O'Donnell, singer
- Proinsias Ó Maonaigh, fiddler
- Tommy Peoples, fiddler
- The Revs, indie rock band
- Liam McCay, multi-instrumentalist.

=== Literary ===
- William Allingham, poet
- E. Rentoul Esler, Late Victorian and Edwardian era novelist. Born in Manorcunningham.
- Patrick MacGill, writer
- Neil McBride poet, author
- Frank McGuinness, playwright, poet, translator
- Annemarie Ní Churreáin, poet
- Mícheál Ó Cléirigh, one of the Four Masters
- Séamus Ó Grianna, writer
- Cathal Ó Searcaigh, poet
- John Toland, philosopher, writer

=== Artists ===
- Felim Egan, painter
- Kenneth King (artist)
- Patsaí Dan Mac Ruairí, painter and "King of Tory"
- Sheila McClean, painter
- Kevin Sharkey, painter

=== Actors ===
- Ray McAnally, actor
- Keith McErlean, actor
- Seán McGinley, actor
- Gavin Ó Fearraigh, actor, model
- Art Parkinson, actor
- John D Ruddy, actor
- Andrew Simpson, actor

=== Film ===
- Gerard Lough, Film director

== Politics ==
- Ian Anderson, prominent Manx politician who was a long-serving member of the Tynwald. From Rathmullan.
- Harry Blaney, former Irish politician
- Neil Blaney, former Irish politician
- Niall Blaney, Irish politician
- Brian Brady, Irish politician
- Joseph Brennan, Irish politician
- Isaac Butt, barrister, MP and founder of the Home Rule movement. Born and raised in Glenfin, a district near Ballybofey.
- Francis Campbell, former American politician, born in County Donegal
- Sir Bob Cooper, former Deputy Leader of the Alliance Party of Northern Ireland and formerly the long-serving head of the Equality Commission for Northern Ireland. Born and raised in East Donegal.
- Mary Coughlan, former Tánaiste and former TD for Donegal South-West. First woman to be appointed as Minister for Agriculture, Food and the Marine in the Irish government.
- Pat "the Cope" Gallagher, Irish politician
- Tommy Gallagher, SDLP politician who was formerly an MLA for Fermanagh and South Tyrone
- Paddy Harte, retired Irish politician
- William Hay, Baron Hay of Ballyore, served as Speaker of the Northern Ireland Assembly, 2007–2014. Lord Hay of Ballyore also served as an MLA for Foyle up until 2014.
- Samuel Hays (1783–1868), American politician, born in County Donegal
- Cahir Healy, journalist who was a very prominent Irish nationalist politician and who was a long-serving Member of Parliament for County Fermanagh. Born and raised near Mountcharles
- James Hewitt, 4th Viscount Lifford, peer who once served as deputy lieutenant of County Donegal. He also served as High Sheriff of Donegal, 1841–1845. Lord Lifford was also a prominent businessman in the county, serving as Chairman of the Finn Valley Railway c. 1860. He also served as Chairman of the West Donegal Railway. He sat as an Irish representative peers in the House of Lords, 1856–1887.
- Colonel Sir Michael McCorkell, British Army soldier who became a prominent Ulster Unionist Party politician in Derry. He served as Lord Lieutenant of County Londonderry, 1975–2000. Born in Buncrana.
- Basil McCrea, formerly a prominent Unionist politician in the Northern Ireland Assembly. He was the leader of NI21 from 2013 to 2016, and was previously a member of the UUP. Born in Ramelton.
- Jim McDaid, Irish politician
- Dinny McGinley, Irish politician
- Joe McHugh, Irish politician
- James McNulty, Irish political activist
- Charles James O'Donnell, politician
- Peadar O'Donnell, Irish Republican
- Alexander Porter, U.S. Senator in the United States Senate.
- Bríd Rodgers, former MLA who formerly served as SDLP Deputy Leader and was formerly Northern Irish Minister for Agriculture and Rural Development. Born and raised in Gweedore.
- Patrick Stone, Member of the Western Australian Legislative Assembly

== Other ==
- Sir Alexander Armstrong, explorer, was educated at Trinity College, Dublin, and at the University of Edinburgh. He entered the Medical Department of the Royal Navy in 1842 and became its Director-General in 1869.
- Sir George Bowen, colonial governor in the British Empire and author. He was born and raised at Bogay House, near Newtowncunningham.
- William C. Campbell, winner of 2015 Nobel Prize in Physiology or Medicine, born in Ramelton
- Vincent "Mad Dog" Coll, mafia enforcer in the United States of America
- Sir Jamie Flanagan, Chief Constable of the Royal Ulster Constabulary (RUC), 1973–1976. Sir Jamie was born in Derry but was raised near Killygordon in East Donegal.
- Professor John Kells Ingram, economist, Irish patriot and poet who was based at Trinity College, Dublin
- Major-General Sir James Murray Irwin, senior-ranking doctor in the British Army. From Manorcunningham
- Robert Johnston, recipient of the Victoria Cross; rugby union international
- Andrew Lewis, soldier
- Michael Malloy, was known for surviving multiple murder attempts
- Hugh McLaughlin, inventor
- Sir Robert Montgomery, colonial administrator in British India. Grandfather of Field Marshal Bernard Montgomery, British military commander during the Second World War. Sir Robert was from Moville in Inishowen.
- Henry Musgrave, DL, was an East Ulster businessman and philanthropist. Involved with several business concerns, including the Donegal Railway Company, he gave money to several causes and was made an honorary burgess of the City of Belfast in March 1917. He was also grand juror and High Sheriff of Donegal for 1909–10.
- Hugh Roe O'Donnell, nobleman and soldier
- Walter Patterson, first British colonial governor of Prince Edward Island
- Sir Gerry Robinson, businessman and former head of Granada Television
- Joseph Sweeney, from Burtonport, 1916 Rising veteran, Irish revolutionary, army general and former TD
- Pauric Sweeney, fashion designer
- Frederick Young, from Culdaff was the founder of the Sirmoor Battalion later 2nd King Edward VII's Own Gurkha Rifles (The Sirmoor Rifles), the first Gurkha regiment to fight for the British.

== See also ==
- List of people from Letterkenny
