= Termon =

Village in County Donegal, Ireland

Termon An Tearmann
- Village
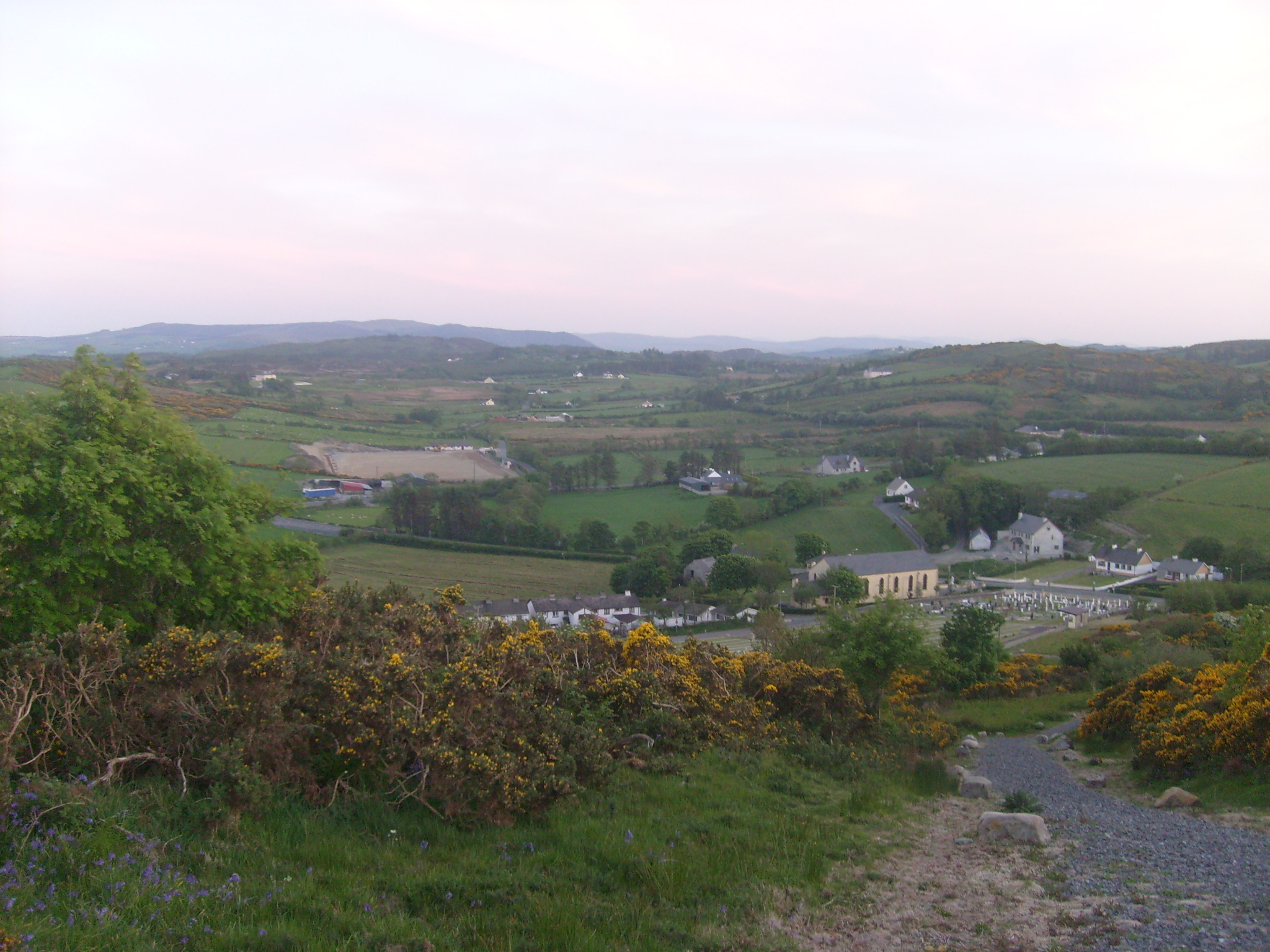
- View of Termon and its church

- Location in Ireland
- Coordinates: 55°02′50″N 7°48′55″W
- Country: Ireland
- Province: Ulster
- County: County Donegal

Government
  - Dáil Éireann: Donegal
- Time zone: UTC+0 (WET)
  - Summer (DST): UTC+1 (IST (WEST))
- Irish Grid Reference: C118221

Termon (Irish: An Tearmann, meaning 'place of sanctuary') is a village in the north of County Donegal, Ireland.

== Geography ==
Termon is located, on the N56 road, approximately 14 kilometres (9 mi) northwest of Letterkenny and 13 kilometres (8 mi) southeast of Creeslough. The area around Termon includes the townlands of Currin, Doon, Drumlaurgagh, Gortnalaragh, Drumbrick, Drumoughill, Cloncarney, Terhillion, Gortnalaragh, Clonkilly, Knocknabollan, Fawans, Drumdeevin, Drumfin, Barnes Upper, Barnes Lower, Stragraddy, Ballybuninabber, Letterfad, Goal and Gurtin, Loughaskerry.

There are several hills close to Termon, including Lough Salt (469m), the hills of Barnes-Crockmore (the "Resting Bishop") with peaks at 324m, 349m and 307m, and Stragraddy mountain (285m).

The Lurgy river (Irish: An Lorgaigh) runs through Termon. Other bodies of water in the area include Clonkillymore Lough, Clonkillybeg Lough, Cloncarney Lough, Doon Lough, Lough Darragh, Lough Askerry and Lough Mnafin.

== History ==
Evidence of ancient settlement in the area includes a number of ringfort, standing stone and megalithic tomb sites in the townlands of Drumbrick and An Ghabhail. The ringfort in Drumbrick townland is situated at the top of Drumbrick hill and is visible from the Burn Road. Other historical sites in the area include:

- Megalithic tomb 1 (grid ref C107248) - Barnes townland
- Megalithic tomb 2 (grid ref C107219) - Gortnalaragh townland, known locally as Dermot and Groinna, 2 stones visible from the Terhillion Rd
- Megalithic tomb 3 (grid ref C119211) - Drumbrick townland
- Standing stones 1 (grid ref C108245) - Barnes townland
- Standing stones 2 (grid ref C109241) - Barnes townland (Ogham standing stones) - these are thought to be the original boundaries of 'An Tearmann' denoting sanctuary, as those seeking it were thought to be within the Kilmacrenan Abbey.
- Cillin 1 (grid ref C109240) - Barnes townland
- Cillin 2 (grid ref C125206) - Clonkilly townland

== Religion ==
There are a number of religious sites around Termon, including holy wells, Mass rocks and other places of worship. Several of these sites are significant to members of the local Roman Catholic community.

=== St. Columba's Chapel ===
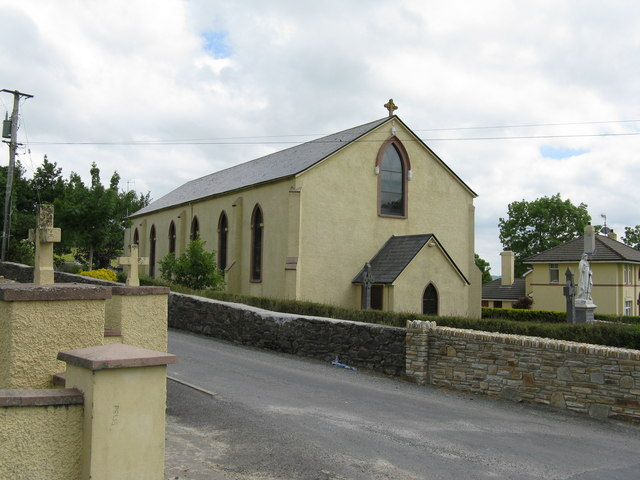
Termon's Catholic church is dedicated to St. Columba

The local Catholic church, which is dedicated to St. Columba, is one of two churches in the Catholic parish of Gartan and Termon within the Diocese of Raphoe. St. Columba's Church was built c. 1903.

=== Holy wells ===
Doon Well (Irish: Tobar an Dúin) was established by Lector O'Friel sometime around the 1670s. Doon Well's origins are pre-Christian and a number of Bronze Age artefacts were found near the well. A 'tóchar' (ancient wooden road) also runs underneath the bog adjacent to Doon Rock. The water from the well was historically used in the inauguration ceremony of the O'Donnells. Stations and rosary are still 'walked' from St. Columba's chapel to Doon Well on Hogmanay (New Year's Eve) and May eve.

Ethne's Well (Irish: Turas an Ri), in the Barnes Lower townland, is named after Columba's mother Ethne. This holy well had stations performed on 9 June for nine nights.

=== Mass rocks ===
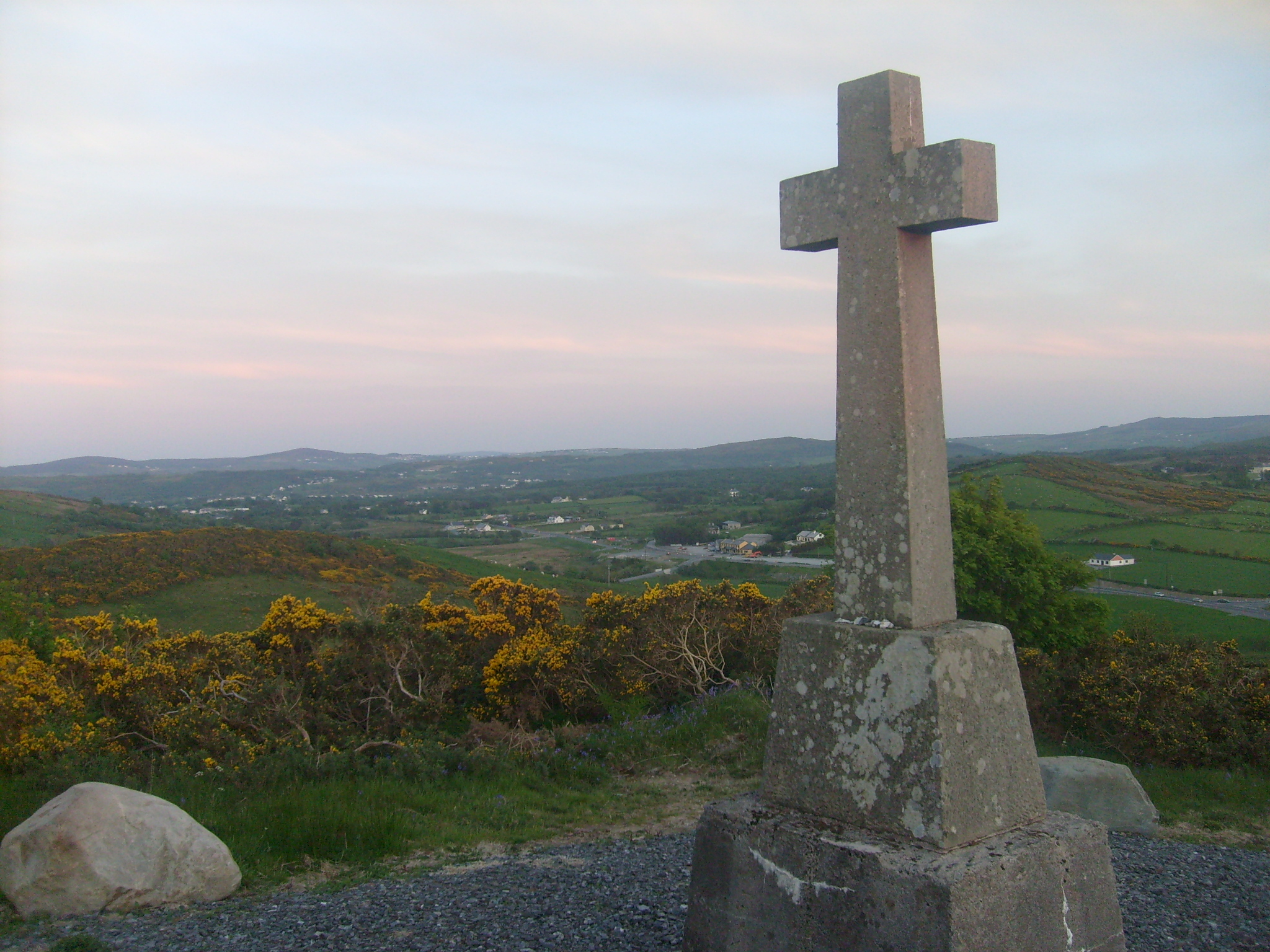
Cross and a panoramic view of the Termon area

There thought to be several Mass rocks in the area. Used to secretly celebrate Mass during the time of the penal laws, there are reputed mass rock sites in the townlands of townland of Fawans and Terhillion (or Tirkillin). A nearby cliff is also called Binn an tSagairt or "hill of the priest".

=== Rock of Doon ===
Doon Rock (c. 120m in height) is approximately 2.5 km (1.6 mi) south of Termon and west of Kilmacrenan. It is the site where 25 O'Donnells were inaugurated as Chief of the Name and Lord of Tír Chonaill from Eighneachan in 1200 to Niall Garbh Ó Domhnaill in 1603.

Timothy T. O'Donnell, writing in 2001, describes how Red Hugh O'Donnell was inaugurated on 3 May 1592. O'Donnell states that:

"The inauguration of the O'Donnell as King of Tyrconnell was both civil and religious in nature. The ceremony took place on the great Rock of Doon which is one mile west of Kilmacrenan, from which one is give a breathtaking view of the surrounding country. It began with the religious rites in the church of the nearby monastery and holy well singing Psalms and hymns in honor of Christ and St. Columba for the success of the Prince's sovereignty. Standing on the Rock surrounded by nobles and his clansmen, the Prince received an oath in which he promised to preserve the Church and the laws of the land. The Prince also vowed to deliver the succession of the realm peacefully to his Tanist (his successor). O'Ferghil, the hereditary warden and abbot of Kilmacrenan, performed the religious ceremony of the inauguration of The O'Donnell."

Then, in honour of the Holy Trinity, Hugh may have surveyed his clan lands as he walked three times sunwise around the peak of Rock of Doon, after which the members of the other Irish clans present acclaimed him as "O'Donnell".

== Sport ==
The local Gaelic Athletic Association (GAA) club, Termon GAA, was founded in 1963 and has its grounds at the Burn Road in Termon. As of 2025, the club's senior mens team were playing in the Donegal Senior Football Championship, having won the Donegal Intermediate Football Championship in 2024. Termon's Ladies' Gaelic football (LGFA) team were crowned All-Ireland Ladies' Club Football Champions in 2014, defeating Mournabbey of Cork in the final. Termon LGFA have won two Ulster Club Championships - one in 2010 and one in 2014.
