= Prague City University =

English-language private university in Prague, Czech Republic

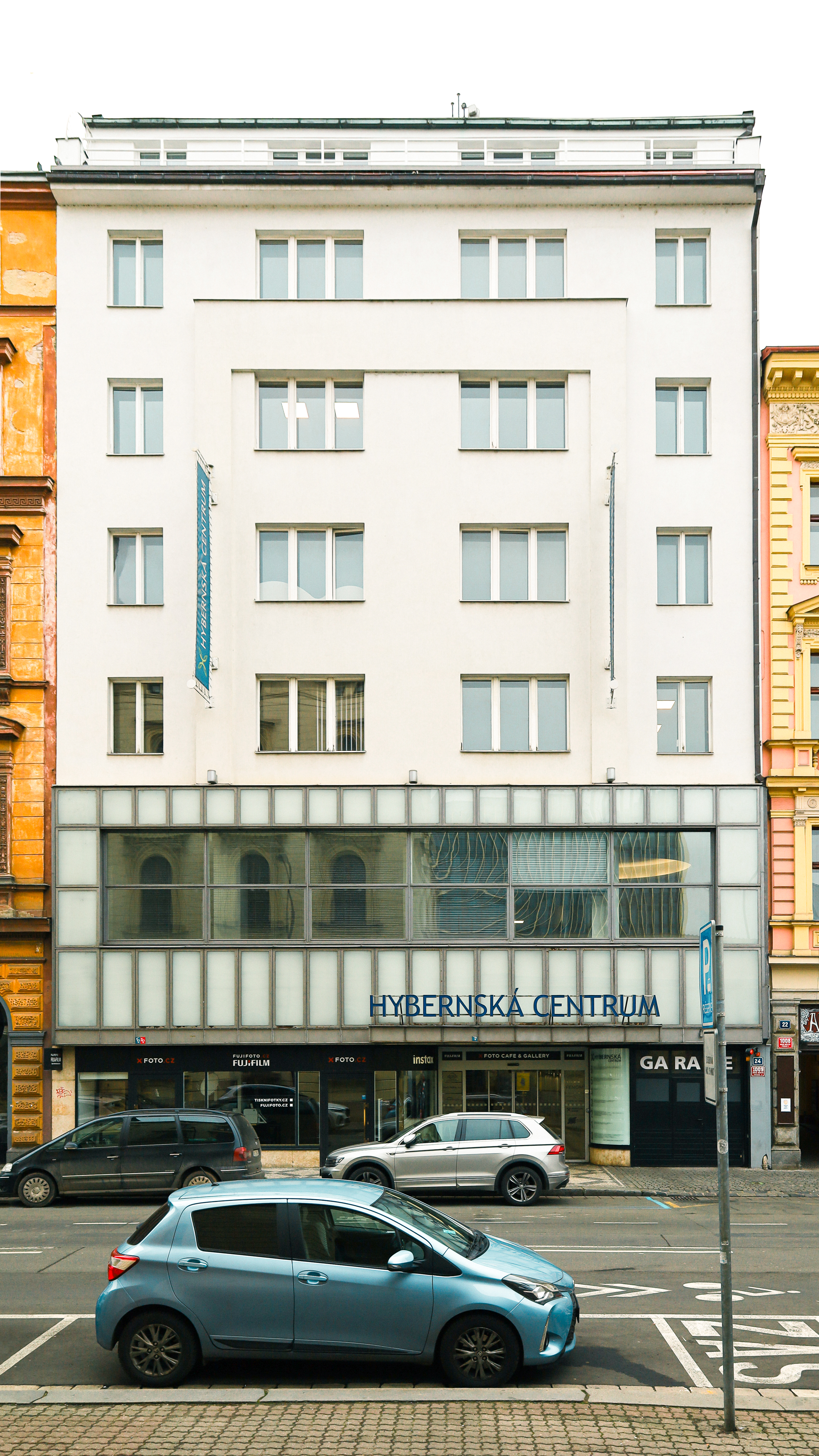
- Motto: The British University in Prague
- Type: Private
- Established: 2004
- Affiliations: Teesside University; Pearson plc
- President: Douglas Hajek
- Students: 600
- Location: Prague, Czech Republic; 50°4′42.8″N 14°26′23.88″E
- Campus: Urban
- Website: www.praguecityuniversity.cz
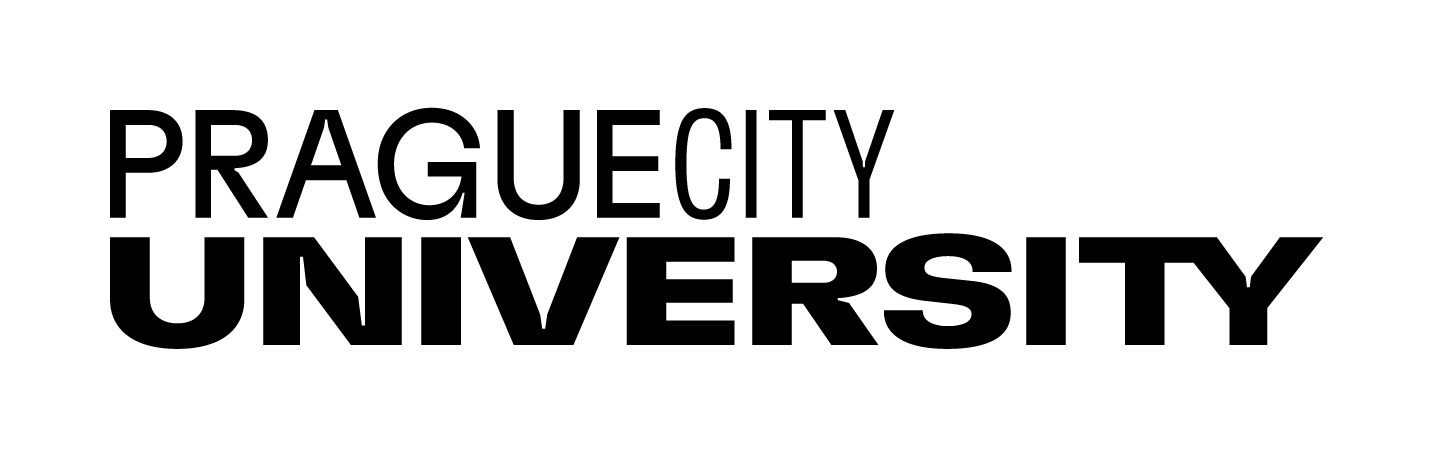

Prague City University was an English-language private university in the Vinohrady district of Prague, Czech Republic, which operated from 2004 until 2025. It was known as Prague College until 2021. The university's two campuses were both located in the Prague 1 district.

== History ==
Prague College was established in 2004. The director and co-founder of the university was Canadian Douglas Hajek, who had been working in education in the Czech Republic since 1992.

The institution was renamed as Prague City University in 2021. The university consisted of three schools (Business, Art & Design, Media & IT) teaching approximately 550 students, and a research centre. About 35% of the students were Czech, and the rest were international students.

The university ceased operations in August 2025.

== Academics ==
The university was accredited by British bodies, including Teesside University, and Pearson Education. It was also recognised by the Czech Ministry of Education as a branch of a foreign university in the Czech Republic.

The university introduced its first qualifications in international business and web design in 2004. In 2005, it introduced Higher National Diplomas (HNDs) in cooperation with Edexcel, in business, graphic design, interactive media and computing. The first Bachelor's degree, a Bachelor of Arts (BA) in International Management, was introduced in 2008 in cooperation with Teesside University in the United Kingdom. 2009 saw the introduction of a BA (Hons) in Graphic Design, and the foundation of the research centre. In 2010, a Master of Science in International Management and a BA (Hons) in Fine Art (Experimental Media) were added to the curriculum. They were followed by a BSc (Hons) in Computing and a Foundation Diploma in Art and Design (2011), an MSc in Computing, professional and foundation diplomas in Business and Computing (2012) and a BA (Hons) in Applied Accounting and Business Finance (2013).
