= Donegal Senior Ladies' Football Championship =

- Irish: Craobh Peile na mBan Sinsear Co. Dhún na nGall
- Founded: 1992
- Title holders: St Eunan's (14th title)
- Most titles: St Eunan's (14 titles)
- Sponsors: O’Reilly's Sportswear

The Donegal Senior Ladies' Football Championship is an annual LGFA competition organised by Donegal LGFA among the top ladies' football clubs in County Donegal.

The winner qualifies to represent the county in the Ulster Ladies' Senior Club Football Championship, the winner of which progresses to the All-Ireland Senior Club Ladies' Football Championship. The winners are presented with the Donna Dunnion Boyle Memorial Cup, which was inaugurated in 2022. Ms Dunnion Boyle represented Donegal LGFA at inter-county level and had previously won Donegal Senior LGFA Championships. She was wife of Brendan Boyle and the sister of Barry Dunnion. Previously the winners had been presented with the Dom Breslin Cup.

St Eunan's are the 2026 champions. St Eunan's are the most successful club, with 14 titles.

== Winners and finalists ==
=== Results by team ===
Results by team
#	Team	Wins	Years won	Last final lost
1	St Eunan's	14	1992, 1993, 1994, 1996, 1997, 1998, 1999, 2000, 2001, 2002, 2003, 2004, 2005, 2026	2013
2	Termon	9	2010, 2012, 2013, 2014, 2015, 2019, 2022, 2023, 2024	2026
3	Glenfin	6	2011, 2017, 2018, 2020, 2021, 2025	2023
4	Moville	3	2008, 2009, 2016	2024
5	Four Masters	2	2006, 2007	2012
6	Aodh Ruadh	1	1995	1998

=== Finals listed by year ===
Year	Winner	Score	Opponent	Score
2026	St Eunan's	2–10	Termon	1–8
2025	Glenfin	2–8	Termon	0–5
2024	Termon	7–13	Moville	1–8
2023	Termon	2–5	Glenfin	0–7
2022 (Note: (Match finished 0-14 to 1-11 AET. Termon won 5-3 on free-kicks))	Termon	0–19	Glenfin	1-14 AET
2021	Glenfin	1-23	Termon	2-18 AET
2020	Glenfin	7-7	Termon	2–10
2019	Termon	5–6	Glenfin	2–13
2018	Glenfin	4–7	Moville	3–7
2017	Glenfin	1–9	Moville	1–7
2016	Moville	5–15	Glenfin	4–8
2015	Termon	4–13	Glenfin	1–11
2014	Termon	4–18	Glenfin	1–11
2013	Termon	4–11	St Eunan's	2–3
2012	Termon	7–9	Four Masters	0–4
2011	Glenfin	2–12	Four Masters	1–7
2010	Termon	2–7	Glenfin	1–9
2009	Moville	3–13	Termon	4–3
2008	Moville	3–14	Glenfin	1–10
2007	Four Masters	1–13	Moville	2–8
2006 (Note: There appears to be no match report available for this game. However the scoreline is recorded in the Donegal Ladies notes which appeared on page 21 of the Sport Section in the Donegal News dated 15 September 2006.)	Four Masters	2–5	Moville	0–4
2005	St Eunan's	2–16	Moville	3–6
2004 (Note: The headline for the newspaper reference for this final is in error. It was in fact St Eunan's 12th title.)	St Eunan's	1–14	Four Masters	0–4
2003 (Note: St Eunan's win following a replay.)	St Eunan's	1-9 / 3–16	Four Masters	2-6 / 0–9
2002	St Eunan's	1–9	Four Masters	0–6
2001	St Eunan's	1–7	Four Masters	1–0
2000	St Eunan's	2–12	Four Masters	3–1
1999	St Eunan's	2–10	Four Masters	0–5
1998	St Eunan's	2–6	Aodh Ruadh	1–8
1997	St Eunan's	4–11	Aodh Ruadh	1–3
1996	St Eunan's	5–6	Aodh Ruadh	2–5
1995	Aodh Ruadh	2–9	MacCumhaill's	1–10
1994	St Eunan's	4–11	Urris	0–2
1993 (Note: St Eunan's win following a replay.)	St Eunan's	0-7 / 2–10	MacCumhaill's	1-4 / 2–8
1992	St Eunan's	3–13	Cloich Cheann Fhaola	3–5
