= 1999 Jack Milne Cup =

The 1999 Jack Milne Cup was the second staging of the annual Jack Milne Cup.

It was won by Gary Hicks.

== Meeting Details ==
- September 26, 1999
- (United States) Costa Mesa, California

| Pos. | Rider | Heat Scores | Total | Semi Final 1 | Semi Final 2 | Last Chance | Final |
|---|---|---|---|---|---|---|---|
| 1 | (United States) Gary Hicks | (4,4,3) | 11 | 2nd | | | 1st |
| 2 | (United States) Scott Brant | (4,4,4) | 12 | | 2nd | | 2nd |
| 3 | (United States) Andy Northrup | (2,3,3) | 8 | | 3rd | 1st | 3rd |
| 4 | (United States) Brad Oxley | (4,3,3) | 10 | | 1st | | 4th |
| 5 | (United States) Charlie Venegas | (3,4,4) | 11 | 1st | | | 5th |
| 6 | (United States) Jim Estes | (4,3,2) | 9 | 3rd | | 2nd | |
| 7 | (United States) John Aden | (3,2,3) | 8 | 4th | | 3rd | |
| 8 | (United States) Bobby Schwartz | (E,4,4) | 8 | | 4th | 4th | |
| =9 | (United States) Kon Baur | (3,2,2) | 7 | 5th | | | |
| =9 | (United States) Dukie Ermolenko | (2,3,4) | 9 | | 5th | | |
| 11 | (United States) Randi DiFrancesco | (2,2,2) | 6 | | | | |
| 12 | (United States) Jason Chism | (3,0,2) | 5 | | | | |
| 13 | (United States) Charlie Cooley | (1,2,1) | 4 | | | | |
| 14 | (United States) Bryan Thompson | (2,0,1) | 3 | | | | |
| =15 | (United States) Brian Burch | (1,0,1) | 2 | | | | |
| =15 | (United States) Robbie Sauer | (1,1,F) | 2 | | | | |
| =15 | (United States) Mark Adams | (1,1,0) | 2 | | | | |
| =18 | (United States) Richard Jones | (0,1,0) | 1 | | | | |
| =18 | (United States) Johnny Walker | (0,M,1) | 1 | | | | |
| =18 | (United States) Joe Winston | (1) | 1 | | | | |
| 21 | (United States) Brad Sauer | (0,0,F) | 0 | | | | |
