= Shane O'Donnell (Gaelic footballer) =

Irish Gaelic footballer

Personal information
- Born: 2001-2002 Letterkenny, Ireland
- Height: 1.83 m (6 ft 0 in)

Sport
- Sport: Gaelic Football
- Position: Right half-forward
Club
- Years: Club
- 2020–: St Eunan's
Club titles
- Donegal titles: 2
Inter-county
- Years: County
- 2022–: Donegal
Inter-county titles
- Ulster titles: 2
- All-Irelands: 0
- NFL: 1
- All Stars: 0

Shane O'Donnell is an Irish Gaelic footballer who plays for St Eunan's and the Donegal county team. He made his Senior inter-county debut in 2022 before taking a break for his studies and returning in 2024. He was part of the team that lost to Galway in the 2024 All Ireland semi-final and then went one better by winning against Meath in 2025. His debut was against Down in the 2022 Dr McKenna Cup — in that competition he played in each of the four games, including the final of the competition. He played Sigerson Cup football for DCU. At DCU he was studying maths and PE and he went on to qualify as a teacher. Man of the Match in the 2021 Donegal Senior Football Championship Final (as well as the U21 Final), O'Donnell was then harshly sent off in the 2022 Senior County Final. O'Donnell also won the 2024 Donegal Senior Football Championship with his club. On 18 December 2024, he was named winner of the annual Gradam Shéamuis Mhic Géidigh. He is a brother of Conor and Niall.

== Honours ==
Shane O'Donnell Honours

Donegal

- Ulster Senior Football Championship (2): 2024, 2025
- National Football League Division 2 (1): 2024

St Eunan's

- Donegal Senior Football Championship (2): 2021, 2024

Individual

- All Star: 0
  - Nominated in 2025
- Gradam Shéamuis Mhic Géidigh: 2024
