= St Eunan's GAA =

Donegal-based Gaelic games club

- CLG Naomh Adhamhnáin
- Founded: 1930
- County: Donegal
- Nickname: Eunans, The Black and Amber, The Cathedral Town Men
- Colours: Amber and Black
- Grounds: O'Donnell Park
- Coordinates: 54°56′43.35″N 7°45′09.13″W

Playing kits
Standard colours

Senior Club Championships
| | All Ireland | Ulster champions | Donegal champions |
|---|---|---|---|
| Football: | - | - | 18 |
| Hurling: | - | - | 2 |
| Ladies' football: | – | 4 | 13 |

St Eunans GAA (/ˈjuːnən/ YOO-nən; or Naomh Adhamhnáin) is a dual club which plays hurling and Gaelic football. Its home ground is O'Donnell Park in Letterkenny. It fields up to 45 teams, making it the biggest club in its county.

One of the strongholds of Gaelic football in County Donegal, the club has won the most Donegal Senior Football Championship titles, with 17, the most recent in 2026. Considered Donegal's most prolific club, it is renowned for its conveyor belt-like consistency in producing players of senior inter-county quality, including numerous All-Ireland winners. In 2026 they completed a historic achievement as only the second club in Ireland to win 3 respective Senior titles in the 2026 season. Senior Ladies, senior hurling and Senior Football.

Also renowned for its success at minor level, the club has won 19 minor football championships, with 3 minor championship wins and four final appearances in the four years from 2015 to 2018 they have toured abroad, particularly the United States in 1969 and 1998, and Glasgow in 1977. In 1980, it received an All-Ireland Club of the Year Award, at a ceremony in Ballsbridge, Dublin.

It has a long-running boundary dispute with neighbouring club Letterkenny Gaels, which was founded in 1996 and has competed only in the Donegal Junior Football Championship. An agreement was signed between the two clubs that there would be no boundaries within the Town; however, this has not stopped Letterkenny Gaels in its pursuit of dividing the town along parish lines.

== History ==
The club has won a total of 17 Donegal Senior Football Championship titles, the latest of which came in 2026, a 1–16 to 1-15 victory against rivals Glenties in the final at MacCumhaill Park, Ballybofey.

The club is the most successful in the county at underage football, with more than fifty underage championships at under-14, under-16 and under-18 grades, as well as various under-13 and under-15 óg sport successes.

=== Early days ===
Frank "Steve" Donohoe and Mickey McGovern formed a club called the "Fag a Bailes" in 1917 during a meeting at McGovern's Public House on Letterkenny's Lower Main Street. This club would be important to the proper establishment of Gaelic football in East Donegal. The town's first Gaelic football playing field was located where Scoil Colmcille, Letterkenny currently is. Also in the team of that era were goalkeeper Johnny McClean and Fr John McMonagle of Glencar, who played at midfield. Letterkenny's next clubs were the Geraldines (established in 1924) and Letterkenny Rovers. Letterkenny Rovers won the town's first Donegal Senior Football Championship in 1927—beating Carrigans in a final uniquely held at Newtowncunningham—with a field selected, goalposts erected and admission fee of 6d.

=== 1930–1947 ===
1930 brought the foundation of the current club, named for the local saint Adomnán (Eunan; c. AD 624–704), with Geraldines and Rovers fading away. Glencar was the location of the club's first playing pitch. In its first year of existence the club reached the final of the 1930 Donegal Senior Football Championship, losing to Dungloe by a scoreline of 3–2 to 2–3. The club purchased the grounds for O'Donnell Park for £300 in the 1930s. The ground opened on Sunday 2 May 1937, when a hurling match between Donegal and Antrim and a football match between Donegal and Armagh were divided by an address from GAA president R. O'Keeffe, and all were preceded by the Most Rev. Dr. McNeely, Bishop of Raphoe's Blessing of the Park. By the mid-1940s, it was Letterkenny's only GAA club—having also seen off both St Pat's and St Columba's—and the team reached the final of the Donegal Senior Football Championship in 1944, 1946 and 1947, losing to the four-in-a-row invincibles from Gaoth Dobhair.

=== 1948–1969 ===
The club won their first Donegal Senior Football Championship in 1948, defeating old nemesis and previously invincible Gaoth Dobhair by a scoreline of 1–7 to 2–1. The club made the final again in 1949, 1950, 1951 and 1952, eventually winning their second title in 1956, beating Ballyshannon by a scoreline of 0–8 to 1–2. In 1960 the club beat Gaoth Dobhair in the final again, this time by a scoreline of 0–11 to 0–3. In 1967 the club beat St Joseph's by a scoreline of 1–13 to 1–9, and beat the same team again in 1969, by a scoreline of 0–10 to 1–4 on that occasion.

=== 1970s–1990s ===
In 1972 the club beat Clan na nGael—a previous incarnation of Four Masters—by a scoreline of 2–12 to 1–8 in the final at MacCumhaill Park in Ballybofey.

There followed a lull, broken in 1983, when the club defeated Ard an Rátha in the final by a scoreline of 0–8 to 0–3. There would be no further senior titles until 1999. The club fielded an ineligible player against Aodh Ruadh in the 1997 senior final, and were subsequently disqualified from the competition. The title was won on the pitch but taken away in the boardroom in controversial circumstances. The player in question had played championship football in America earlier in the year and despite St Eunan's being given the all-clear to field him the County title was subsequently stripped from the club. The club roared back against Aodh Ruadh in the 1999 final, with Brendan Devenney broke Martin McHugh's record by scoring 0–14 of his team's 1–19 to their opponents' 1–11.

=== 21st-century ===
In the 2001 championship final the club defeated Four Masters by a scoreline of 1–10 to 0–8. In the 2006 final Gaoth Dobhair beat them by 1–6 to 0–4 In 2007 they beat local rivals Glenswilly by a scoreline of 0–12 to 1–3. In 2008 they beat Termon, their neighbours on the other side of town, by a scoreline of 2–13 to 1–8 and went on to win a match in the Ulster Senior Club Football Championship for the first time, defeating Clonoe O'Rahilly's of Tyrone, the county that had just won that year's All-Ireland title, in the quarter-final. The 2008 team were the first from Donegal to win a match in the Ulster Club SFC for five years. However, Crossmaglen Rangers knocked them out in the semi-final. In 2009 the club achieved the three-in-a-row, defeating Naomh Conaill by a scoreline of 0–13 to 0–6. They would beat the same team in the 2012 final. 2011 brought minor football and hurling titles; in the football, they defeated Ardara 3–7 to 0–3, with Sean McBride, Lee McMonagle and Callum Keaveney getting the goals, while, in the hurling, they made history in July by winning their first ever minor hurling title, defeating Burt in a great contest highlighted by a stunning goal from Kevin Meehan. In 2013, a player was rushed to hospital with serious injuries sustained during a game against Naomh Conaill. They beat Glenswilly again in the 2014 final.

==== 2012 season ====
Eunan's were crowned Donegal Senior Football Champions in 2012. The decisive goal in the final was scored by young Lee McMonagle in the 50th minute of the game, following a layoff from full-forward Ross Wherity, who received the ball via a long pass from Rory Kavanagh. The teams were level on many occasions until Mark McGowan scored the winning point in freak circumstances. Brendan McDyre of opponents Naomh Conaill attempted to backpass to his goalkeeper Stephen McGrath only for the ball to drift out for a '45'. McGowan stepped up to punish. As the game ended he was photographed celebrating—stooped, wild-eyed with open mouth, sweat-soaked, bare thighs tensed, veins throbbing, mud-stained legs apart and clenched fists turned upwards.

==== 2014 season ====
The club secured a 15th Donegal Senior Football Championship on 2 November 2014 against local rivals Glenswilly at MacCumhaill Park, Ballybofey, a 0–9 to 0–6 win, with John Haran at 38 years old putting in a man-of-the-match performance in the middle of the field. Manager was Maxi Curran, who was the first manager outside the club's membership in its history.

The under-21 side defeated a Cill Chartha team, with a flurry of late goals in the final of the Donegal Under-21 Football Championship leading to a scoreline of 3–12 to 1–15.

The club's hurlers won their first Donegal Under-16 Hurling Championship title, defeating Buncrana in the final. The under-15 boys experienced both county and provincial success in the seven-a-side og sport tournament. The club's footballers won the Donegal Under-13 Football championship.

==== 2015 season ====
The under-14 hurlers and footballers both did the double in league and championship. The under-14 footballers won the Feile All-Ireland. The under-14 hurlers won the Feile Shield All-Ireland Title. The under-14 camogie team won the county title and All-Ireland Feile shield. The under-16 and minor footballers won county championships, with wins over Seán Mac Cumhaills and Naomh Conaill respectively.

The club's hurlers won their first Donegal Under-21 Hurling Championship, defeating Setanta.

==== 2016 season ====
The under-16 footballers won both county (defeating Seán Mac Cumhaills) and provincial titles (defeating Warrenpoint in Dromore 6–10 to 1–6).

==== 2017 season ====
The club's minor and under-14 footballers both won county championships on September 16, with the club's minor team comfortably beating Cill Chartha by a scoreline of 5–10 to 1–8 and the club's under-14 team accounting for An Clochán Liath by a scoreline of 3-12 to 1-6.

==== 2018 season ====
The under-21 footballers defeated Glenfin by 5–11 to 1–8 to win the Donegal Under-21 Football Championship.

The under-21 hurlers defeated Buncrana to win the club's second Donegal Under-21 Hurling Championship.

The minor footballers won a record 19th Minor Football Championship, and a third in four years, with a 3–14 to 1–7 victory over Naomh Padraig from Muff under the floodlights in Convoy. The minor hurlers won the Donegal Minor Hurling Championship, defeating An Clochán Liath in the final. The minor ladies' team defeated a Moville side going for minor title number six-in-a-row in a high-scoring game at MacCumhaill Park.

==== 2020s ====
Ahead of the 2020 season, John Haran, winner of 8 Donegal Senior Football Championships with the club, was named as the club's chairman after five years as the club's vice-chairman. Conall Dunne also took over as treasurer. In November 2020, Rory Kavanagh was appointed manager of the club's senior team, and he won the Co Senior Championship in his first year in charge in 2021.

St Eunan's overcame a controversial penalty decision, which resulted in Shaun Patton's concession of the game's second goal, to win the 2024 Donegal SFC final. In doing so, the club secured a 16th SFC title to once again move ahead of Gaoth Dobhair, left trailing on 15.

St Eunan's opted to forego the club's right to a replay as a result of substitute Enda McCormick's illegal point in a 2025 Donegal Senior Football Championship game against Termon, doing so in the belief that it "would cause disruption to the championship and risk undermining its integrity". The approach of St Eunan's to this injustice was described as "a touch of class" and "handled with class". The incident brought comparisons with the 2023 All-Ireland Club final when Kilmacud Crokes did a similar thing to Glen. St Eunan's players pointed out the error to officials, but to no avail.

== Notable players ==
Football
A–F

- Tony Blake — 2000 Railway Cup winner
- Eddie Brennan — Sligo and Donegal player
- Paul Carr — 1982 All-Ireland Under-21 Football Championship and 1992 All-Ireland Senior Football Championship winner
- Jim Clarke — county player at minor, under-21 and senior levels (full forward); captained the club to an under-21 county championship
- Mark Crossan — 1992 All-Ireland Senior Football Championship and 2000 Railway Cup winner
- Brendan Devenney — 2000 Railway Cup and 2007 National Football League winner; former international rules football player—Ireland's top scorer in 2001
- Eamonn Doherty — 2010 All-Ireland Under-21 Football Championship finalist, 2018 and 2019 Ulster Senior Football Championship winner
- Conall Dunne — 2007 National Football League winner
- Sean Ferriter

G–L

- Conor Gibbons — has three senior championship medals with the club
- Ciaran Greene — part of the 2000s three-in-a-row team and also a player of the foreign game
- John Hannigan
- John Haran
- Seamus Hoare — goalkeeper with four Railway Cup medals
- Michael Houston — All-Ireland Senior Club Football Championship medal with Thomond College, Limerick
- Rory Kavanagh — 2007 National Football League and 2012 All-Ireland Senior Football Championship winner
- Brendan Kilcoyne — Sligo player
- James Larkin (Independent Fianna Fáil) — won five senior championship medals with the club

M

- Noel McCole
- Sean McEwen
- Leslie McGettigan — Hogan Cup medal with St Jarlath's College
- Paul McGettigan — 1973 Hogan Cup medal with Gormanston College; 1972 and 1974 Ulster Championship winner
- Mark McGowan — scored the winner in the final of the 2012 Donegal Senior Football Championship
- Seán McVeigh — inter-county hurler, Lory Meagher Cup and Nicky Rackard Cup winner
- Cillian Morrison — 2010 All-Ireland Under-21 Football Championship finalist and Cork City soccer star
- Ciarán Moore — 2024 and 2025 Ulster Senior Football Championship winner
- Charlie Mulgrew — 1982 All-Ireland Under-21 Football Championship and 1992 All-Ireland Senior Football Championship winner

N–Z

- Conor O'Donnell Snr
- Niall O'Donnell — 2016 Ulster Minor Football Championship and 2019, 2024 and 2025 Ulster Senior Football Championship winner
- Shane O'Donnell — 2024 and 2025 Ulster Senior Football Championship winner
- Conor Parke — received a Donegal call-up under the management of Rory Gallagher in late 2014
- Shaun Patton — 2018, 2019, 2024 and 2025 Ulster Senior Football Championship winner
- Kevin Rafferty — 2012 All-Ireland Senior Football Championship winner
- Paddy Tunney — Hogan Cup medal with Gormanston College
- Caolan Ward — 2018 and 2019 Ulster Senior Football Championship winner
- Joe "Dodo" Winston — 1972 and 1974 Ulster Senior Football Championship winner
- Ross Wherity — former Australian rules footballer

Hurling

- Seán McVeigh — part of 2019 Christy Ring Cup panel
- Conor Parke — part of 2019 Christy Ring Cup panel

== Managers ==
| Years | Manager |
|---|---|
| 200?–?? | —N/a |
| c. 20??–2007 | Brendan Kilcoyne |
| 2007/8–c. 2012 | Eamon O'Boyle |
| c. 2014–c. 2018 | Maxi Curran |
| c. 2017 | Barry Meehan/Eddie Brennan |
| 2018–2020 | Richard Thornton |
| 2020–2023 | Rory Kavanagh |
| 2023–2025 | Barry Meehan |
| 2025– | Kieran Donnelly |

== Chairmen ==
The following men have been chairman of the club.

| Years | Chairman |
|---|---|
| 1930–?? | —N/a |
| 2014?–2019 | Cathal Green |
| 2019–2025 | John Haran |
| 2025– | Eugene Duffy |

== Other ==
- Michael Houston, former manager
- Michael McGeehin, former coach

== Honours ==
Football

- Donegal Senior Football Championship: 1948, 1956, 1960, 1967, 1969, 1972, 1983, 1997, 1999, 2001, 2007, 2008, 2009, 2012, 2014, 2021, 2024, 2026
- Donegal Junior Football Championship: 1980
- Donegal Senior B (Reserve) Football Championship: 1992, 1996, 2008, 2014, 2016, 2018, 2019, 2021, 2026
- Donegal Under-21 Football Championship: 1976, 1977, 1990, 1997, 2003, 2014, 2018, 2019, 2021
- Donegal Minor Football Championship: 1931, 1938, 1941, 1946, 1947, 1948, 1950, 1972, 1973, 1974, 1978, 1993, 1994, 1995, 2008, 2011, 2015, 2017, 2018

Ladies'

- Donegal Senior Ladies' Football Championship: 1992, 1993, 1994, 1996, 1997, 1998, 1999, 2000, 2001, 2002, 2003, 2004, 2005
- Ulster Ladies' Senior Club Football Championship: 1993, 1996, 1997, 1998

Hurling

- Donegal Senior Hurling Championship: 1972, 2021, 2026
- Donegal Intermediate Hurling Championship: 2001, 2025
- Donegal Junior Hurling Championship: 2000, 2023
- Donegal Minor Hurling Championship: 2011, 2018, 2022

Individual

- John Horan gave Fergus Mac Aoidh a GAA President's Award in 2021.
