= Sean McEwen (Gaelic footballer) =

Gaelic footballer

Sean McEwen is a Gaelic footballer. He played with Donegal at U16, Minor, U-21 and Senior level and also Tipperary at Senior level and clubs St Eunan's and Clonmel Commercials. He made his Senior debut with St Eunan's in 1992. He won the Sigerson Cup in 2000.
