= Conwal Cemetery =

Cemetery in Letterkenny, Ireland

- Reilig Conbháil

Details
- Location: Letterkenny, County Donegal
- Country: Ireland
- Coordinates: 54°56′32″N 7°46′54″W
- Find a Grave: Conwal Cemetery

Conwal Cemetery (Irish: Reilig Conbháil) is a burial ground on the outskirts of Letterkenny in County Donegal. It serves the parish of Conwal and Leck. The Forglug Burn flows along the western boundary of the cemetery, flowing into the River Swilly a short distance to the south of the cemetery.

== Notable burials ==
- Liam Adams (high-profile brother of Gerry Adams, who attended the funeral)
- James Duffy (VC)
- John Hannigan
- Manus Kelly
- Dessie Larkin
- Bernard McGlinchey
- Joe 'Dodo' Winston
