= Conall Dunne =

Irish Gaelic footballer

Personal information
- Born: 1983 or 1984 (age 42–43)
- Occupation: Accountant

Sport
- Sport: Gaelic football
Club
- Years: Club
- ?–2019: St Eunan's
Inter-county
- Years: County
- 200?–2010: Donegal
Inter-county titles
- NFL: 1

"What happened was that we [Dunne and Rory Kavanagh] were down at the Kilmacud Crokes 7s. We'd been up in Dublin. The nature of that, it's a gruelling weekend. So we'd a good few days. We were still feeling quite sore on the Monday. We both landed down to a trial game… I never got any explanation on it from Jim [McGuinness]. There was no fallout… You have to remember Donegal at the time hadn't been too successful and were in a really poor place. So I probably didn't think I was going to be missing out on anything. There is no doubt about it, it was bad timing. And it was disappointing to miss out on Ulster and All-Ireland medals. But that's football, that's life".

— Dunne speaking in 2021 on the abrupt end to his playing days with his county

Conall Dunne (born 1983 or 4) is an Irish former Gaelic footballer who played for St Eunan's and the Donegal county team.

== Club ==
Dunne played his club football for St Eunan's. Among his fans were Joe Kernan.

He had taken over as the club's penalty taker by 2014.

Dunne retired at the end of the 2019 season.

== Inter-county ==
Dunne played at senior level for the Donegal county team.

He made his championship debut in 2002 in Donegal's All-Ireland quarter-final defeat to Dublin. He did not make another appearance in the Championship for three years.

He played in the 2006 Ulster Senior Football Championship Final at Croke Park and scored one point.

He was one of three representatives from his club on the county panel that won the 2007 National Football League.

He scored a goal against Laois in the 2010 National Football League.

He scored a goal against Down in 2010.

He lost his place in the panel when Jim McGuinness took over as manager in late 2010. Himself and Rory Kavanagh arrived to an early trial match but a misunderstanding led them to forget their sportswear. Kavanagh located the necessary in the car park, Dunne could not.

== Personal life ==
Dunne is a chartered accountant (part of the body Chartered Accountants Ireland) and succeeded Niall Doherty (brother of Eamonn Doherty) as treasurer of his club. He trained with PricewaterhouseCoopers and went on to work in the food industry, later establishing an accountancy practice (Conall Dunne & Co).

== Honours ==
Donegal

- National Football League: 2007

St Eunan's

- Donegal Senior Football Championship: X number of… 2007, 2008, 2009, 2012, 2014
