= 1991 Sligo Senior Football Championship =

Gaelic football competition

Tournament details
- County: Sligo
- Year: 1991

Winners
- Champions: Tubbercurry (19th win)
- Manager: Gerry Hennigan
- Captain: Brendan Kilcoyne

Promotion/Relegation
- Promoted team(s): Enniscrone
- Relegated team(s): n/a

This is a round-up of the 1991 Sligo Senior Football Championship. The 1991 final brought down the curtain on a great rivalry, as Tubbercurry defeated St. Mary's in the final by a solitary point, in what was the seventh final meeting in twelve years between both clubs. This was Tubbercurry's 19th title in all, and would be their last of the twentieth century. The defending champions Shamrock Gaels crashed out of the championship in the opening round after defeat to Easkey.

== First round ==
Game	Date	Venue	Team A	Score	Team B	Score
Sligo SFC; First Round	7 July	Tubbercurry	Easkey	2-11	Shamrock Gaels	1-11
Sligo SFC; First Round	7 July	Tubbercurry	Coolera/Strandhill	2-9	Eastern Harps	1-9
Sligo SFC; First Round	7 July	Keash	St. Mary’s	0-10	Curry	0-5
Sligo SFC; First Round	7 July	Keash	Tubbercurry	1-7	Geevagh	0-6
Sligo SFC; First Round	21 July	Easkey	St. Patrick’s	3-10	Enniscrone/Castleconnor	2-3

== Quarter finals ==
Game	Date	Venue	Team A	Score	Team B	Score
Sligo SFC; Quarter Final	28 July	Enniscrone	Tubbercurry	2-9	Coolera/Strandhill	2-6
Sligo SFC; Quarter Final	28 July	Enniscrone	St. Patrick’s	1-7	Easkey	1-5
Sligo SFC; Quarter Final	28 July	Tubbercurry	St. Mary’s	2-12	Grange/Cliffoney/Maugherow	1-13
Sligo SFC; Quarter Final	28 July	Tubbercurry	Tourlestrane	2-7	St. Nathy’s	0-7

== Semi-finals ==
Game	Date	Venue	Team A	Score	Team B	Score
Sligo SFC; Semi-Final	11 August	Easkey	St. Mary’s	2-9	Tourlestrane	1-10
Sligo SFC; Semi-Final	11 August	Keash	Tubbercurry	2-7	St. Patrick's	0-8

== Final ==
Tubbercurry	1-8 - 1-7 (final score after 60 minutes)	St. Mary's
Team: A. Neary; J. Brennan; G. Gilmartin; P. Gilmartin; O. Wynne; P. Regan; P. Brennan; B. Kilcoyne (0-4); P. Kilcoyne; D. Killoran (1-1); P. Seevers (0-1); J. Stenson; G. Ring; B. Murphy (0-1); J. Murphy Substitutes: T. Killoran (0-1); M. Kilcoyne; L. Gilmartin	Half-time: Competition: Sligo Senior Football Championship (Final) Date: 8 September 1991 Venue: Markievicz Park, Sligo Referee: Michael Donnellan (Ballymote)	Team: G. Young; M. Jordan; H. Gilvarry; A. Power; N. Murray; J. Clifford; D. Lynch; T. Breheny (0-1); P. Mullen; M. Galvin; J. Kent (0-1); D. McGoldrick (0-2); D. Cummins (0-1); S. Henneberry (1-0); A. Burke (0-2) Substitutes: M. Laffey; D. McGuire
