= James Duffy (VC) =

Irish recipient of the Victoria Cross and soldier

James Duffy VC
- Born: 17 November 1889; Gweedore, County Donegal, Ireland
- Died: 8 April 1969 (aged 79); Letterkenny, County Donegal, Ireland
- Burial place: Conwal Cemetery, Letterkenny
- Military career
- Allegiance: United Kingdom
- Branch: British Army
- Rank: Private
- Service number: 17978
- Unit: The Royal Inniskilling Fusiliers
- Conflicts: World War I
- Awards: Victoria Cross

James Duffy VC (17 November 1889 – 8 April 1969) (Irish: Séamus Ó Dubhthaigh) was a British Army soldier during the First World War, and an Irish recipient of the Victoria Cross, the highest and most prestigious award for gallantry in the face of the enemy that can be awarded to British and Commonwealth forces.

Duffy was born on 17 November 1889 in Gweedore (Gaoth Dobhair), County Donegal, Ireland. He answered the call to enlist for the duration of the war as a "Kitchener Recruit" in a "New Army" battalion.

He was 28 years old, and a private in the 6th Battalion, The Royal Inniskilling Fusiliers, British Army during the First World War when the following deed took place for which he was awarded the VC.

On 27 December 1917 at Kereina Peak, Palestine, whilst the company was holding a very exposed position, Private Duffy, a stretcher-bearer, and another stretcher-bearer went out to bring in a seriously wounded comrade. When the other stretcher-bearer was wounded, Private Duffy returned to get another man, who was killed almost immediately. The private then went forward alone and, under very heavy fire, succeeded in getting both wounded men under cover and attended to their injuries. His gallantry undoubtedly saved both men's lives.

== Death and legacy ==
He died in Drumany, Letterkenny on 7 April 1969 and was buried at Conwal Cemetery. His Victoria Cross is displayed at the Inniskilling Museum in Enniskillen Castle, Northern Ireland.

A stone bench was unveiled in Letterkenny Town Park on 10 July 2007 to honour the war veteran. His daughter Nelly was present when former Letterkenny Mayor Ciaran Brogan unveiled the bench in one of his final duties.
