= Martin Griffin (Gaelic footballer) =

Donegal Gaelic footballer (died 2021)

Personal information
- Nicknames: Big Griffin; Big Griff
- Born: 1953/4
- Died: 6 November 2021

Sport
- Sport: Gaelic football
- Position: Full-back/Midfield
Club
- Years: Club
- 197?–19??: Seán Mac Cumhaills
Club titles
- Donegal titles: 1
Inter-county
- Years: County
- 1970s–1990: Donegal
- Ulster titles: 3

Martin Griffin (1953/4 – 6 November 2021) was an Irish Gaelic footballer who played for Seán Mac Cumhaills of Ballybofey and the Donegal county team.

He won three Ulster Senior Football Championship medals with his county, each in a different decade: 1974, 1983 and 1990. He won the last of those at the age of 36. He could play in the full-back position or in midfield. For the second Ulster title he was playing in midfield. He could fetch, kick and had quick hands.

Griffin won a Donegal Senior Football Championship with his club in 1977. He was from Stranorlar. A grandfather, he was married to Margaret and had two daughters Ann Marie and Donna, while his mother May, five brothers and four sisters outlived him.

Griffin died suddenly on 6 November 2021, at the age of 67. A minute's silence was held in memory of Griffin before the final of the 2021 Donegal Senior Football Championship the following day. He was buried later that week at Drumboe Cemetery in Stranorlar, after funeral mass at the Church of Mary Immaculate.
