= Brendan Kilcoyne =

Irish Gaelic footballer and manager

Personal information
- Born: 1967 or 1968 (age 57–58)
- Occupations: Collection Accounts Manager with Ulster Bank

Sport
- Sport: Gaelic football
Clubs
- Years: Club
- 198?–199? 199?–200?: Tubbercurry; St Eunan's
Inter-county
- Years: County
- ?–?: Sligo

Brendan Kilcoyne (born 1967/8) is an Irish Gaelic football manager, selector and former player. He has played for St Eunan's, Tubbercurry and the Sligo county team.

== Career ==
Kilcoyne won two Sligo Senior Football Championship titles, in 1986 and 1991 (as captain). He won two Donegal Senior Football Championship titles with St Eunan's, in 1999 and 2001 (as well as the disputed title of 1997).

As well as playing for St Eunan's, Kilcoyne has managed the club. He led the club to the 2007 Donegal SFC title, but after defeat in the 2007 Ulster Senior Club Football Championship, he accused the county board of collaborating with opponent Cavan Gaels.

After managing the St Eunan's club to the Donegal SFC title, Kilcoyne was a candidate to replace Tommy Breheny as Sligo senior manager when Breheny resigned in 2007. Kilcoyne was part of the Donegal under-21 management team of Maxi Curran, whose players featured in an Ulster Under-21 Football Championship final in 2015. Kilcoyne was also a selector with St Eunan's, while working as a selector with the Donegal under-21 team. Later that year, Kilcoyne joined the Donegal senior management team for the 2016 season. He remained in this position for the 2017 season. Although originally from County Sligo, Kilcoyne moved to Letterkenny in the 1990s, and continues to support Donegal in competitive fixtures. In 2020, Kilcoyne was a selector with the Donegal minor team. In 2023, Kilcoyne had a role with the Donegal minor team, described variously as a mentor and assistant manager. Later that year, he was appointed as part of the backroom management team of the Donegal under-20 footballers.

Kilcoyne has appeared on Highland Radio and Newstalk as a match analyst.
