= Conor O'Donnell (St Eunan's footballer) =

Irish Gaelic footballer

Sport
- Sport: Gaelic football
- Position: Half-back
Club
- Years: Club
- 201?–: St Eunan's
Club titles
- Donegal titles: 2
Inter-county
- Years: County
- 2020–: Donegal

Conor O'Donnell, known as Conor O'Donnell Snr to distinguish him from another footballer who plays with the same club, is an Irish Gaelic footballer who plays for St Eunan's and the Donegal county team.

The elder brother of Niall, O'Donnell — a half-back — was first called into the Donegal senior team for the 2020 Dr McKenna Cup. He started the opening 2020 National Football League game against Mayo and completed the game. He also started and completed the next two games against Meath and Galway. He did not feature in the next two games, against Dublin and Monaghan. However, the COVID-19 pandemic then brought all competition to a halt and, upon resumption in October, O'Donnell sustained an injury during a challenge match against Roscommon which left him unable to play in the remaining league games against Tyrone and Kerry in October 2020.

With his club he won the 2021 Donegal Senior Football Championship, scoring a point in the final. He also scored points in the quarter-final and semi-final.

O'Donnell then won the 2024 Donegal Senior Football Championship with his club.
