= 2017 Donegal county football team season =

Donegal county football team
2017 season
- Stadium: MacCumhaill Park, Ballybofey
- NFL D1: 3rd
- All-Ireland SFC: Round 4 qualifier
- Ulster SFC: Semi-finalist

The following is a summary of Donegal county football team's 2017 season.

== Squad ==
Ethan O'Donnell

== Personnel changes ==
Richard Thornton from Coalisland helped train the team in 2017. Thornton took over from former Westmeath footballer Jack Cooney after two years, while Brendan Kilcoyne stayed on as a selector.

2012 All Star Colm McFadden retired at the end of the previous season. As did Eamon McGee (though he never won an All Star).

Christy Toye, Rory Kavanagh and David Walsh also retired ahead of the 2017 season. Leo McLoone also left. So did Odhrán Mac Niallais. And Anthony Thompson.

On Valentine's Day, Neil Gallagher attended training at Convoy — it was upon the Convoy turf that he broke down for the final time and relinquished his status as an inter-county footballer. The manager later described him as "very disappointed... He wanted to give it a go... He got the back re-scanned and tried to build it up". He announced his retirement from inter-county football at the age of 33 on 20 February 2017.

== Competitions ==
=== National Football League Division 1 ===
In the opening game against Kerry, three players had their senior debuts (Jason McGee, Michael Langan and Jamie Brennan), with Caolan Ward and Paul Brennan making their first competitive starts.

==== Table ====
Qualify for Division 1 final Automatic relegation to Division 2

Team	Pld	W	D	L	F	A	Diff	Pts
Dublin	7	4	3	0	6-109	4-72	43	11
Kerry	7	3	2	2	6-103	7-87	13	8
Donegal	7	3	2	2	5-90	7-74	10	8
Monaghan	7	3	2	2	7-79	5-82	3	8
Mayo	7	4	0	3	3-90	4-90	-3	8
Tyrone	7	3	1	3	3-87	4-81	3	7
Cavan	7	1	2	4	4-72	2-101	-23	4
Roscommon	7	1	0	6	6-85	7-128	-46	2

- Kerry, Donegal, Monaghan and Mayo are ranked by score difference.

==== Fixtures ====
5 February 2017 Round 1	Donegal	1-17 - 2-17	Kerry	O'Donnell Park, Letterkenny
14.00	Michael Murphy 1-3 (1-0, pen, 0-3 frees), Patrick McBrearty 0-4 (0-3 frees), Ciarán Thompson 0-3, Darach O'Connor 0-2, Paul Brennan, Martin O'Reilly, Ryan McHugh, Eoin McHugh and Conor Gibbons 0-1 each.	Report	Paul Geaney 2-4 (0-2 frees), James O’Donoghue 0-3, Jack Savage 0-3 (0-1 free), Donnchadh Walsh 0-2, Tom O’Sullivan, David Moran, Jonathan Lyne, Paul Murphy and Jack Barry 0-1 each.	Referee: Maurice Deegan (Laois)

12 February 2017 Round 2	Roscommon	2-09 - 0-16	Donegal	Dr Hyde Park, Roscommon
14.00	Ciaran Murtagh 1-4 (0-2 frees), Conor Devaney 1-0, Enda Smith, Kevin Higgins 0-2 each, Fintan Cregg 0-1	Report	Ciarán Thompson, Martin O'Reilly, Eoin McHugh 0-3 each, Patrick McBrearty 0-2 (0-1f), Michael Murphy 0-2 (0-2f) each, Michael Carroll, Eoghan Bán Gallagher, Jamie Brennan 0-1 each

26 February 2017 Round 3	Donegal	2-05 - 1-08	Dublin	MacCumhail Park, Ballybofey
14.00	Jason McGee 1-1, Ryan McHugh 1-0, Ciarán Thompson, Michael Murphy 0-2f each	Report	Niall Scully 1-1, Dean Rock (0-3f), Shane B. Carthy, Ciaran Reddin, Ciarán Kilkenny, David Byrne 0-1 each

4 March 2017 Round 4	Cavan	0-11 - 1-16	Donegal	Breffni Park, Cavan
19:00		Report

18 March 2017 Round 5	Donegal	0-12 - 0-06	Tyrone	MacCumhaill Park, Ballybofey
19:00		Report

26 March 2017 Round 6	Donegal	1-11 - 1-11	Monaghan	Fr Tierney Park, Ballyshannon
15:00		Report

2 April 2017 Round 7	Mayo	1-12 - 0-13	Donegal	MacHale Park, Castlebar
14:00		Report		Attendance: 14,102

=== Ulster Senior Football Championship ===
The draw for the 2017 Ulster Senior Football Championship took place in Dublin in mid-October 2016. In the quarter-final victory against Antrim, four players had their first championship starts (Jamie Brennan, Michael Carroll, Jason McGee and Caolan Ward).

==== Bracket ====
Preliminary round
Monaghan	1-20
Fermanagh	1-11

Quarter-finals
Derry	0-11
Tyrone	0-22
Donegal	3-19
Antrim	1-9
Down	0-15
Armagh	2-7
Cavan	0-15
Monaghan	1-15

Semi-finals
Tyrone	1-21
Donegal	1-12
Down	1-14
Monaghan	0-15

Final
Tyrone	2-17
Down	0-15

==== Fixtures ====
21 May 2017
4:00 pm

Donegal	3-19 - 1-09	Antrim
M Murphy 0-6 (5f), P McBrearty 1-2 (2f), J Brennan 1-1, C Thompson 0-4 (3f), P McGrath 1-0, M Langan 0-2, H McFadden, K Lacey, F McGlynn, M McHugh 0-1 each	Report	CJ McGourty 0-6 (6f), C Small 1-0, T McCann 0-2, S Beatty 0-1

MacCumhaill Park, Ballybofey, Ballybofey
Attendance: 10,083
Referee: Paddy Neilan (Roscommon)

18 June 2017; 2:00 pm	Tyrone	1-21 - 1-12	Donegal	St Tiernach's Park, Clones; Attendance: 22,609; Referee: David Gough (Meath); Man of the Match: Pádraig Hampsey
18 June 2017; 2:00 pm	Tiernan McCann 1-1, Niall Sludden 0-4, Kieran McGeary 0-3, Mark Bradley 0-2, Mattie Donnelly 0-2, Peter Harte 0-2, Padraig Hampsey 0-2, David Mulgrew 0-1, Sean Cavanagh 0-1 (f), Declan McClure 0-1, Ronan O'Neill 0-1, Niall Morgan 0-1 (45).	Report	Patrick McBrearty 0-6 (2fs), Michael Murphy 0-3 (2 '45's), Micheal Carroll 1-0, Martin Reilly 0-1, Michael Langan 0-1, Hugh McFadden 0-1.	St Tiernach's Park, Clones; Attendance: 22,609; Referee: David Gough (Meath); Man of the Match: Pádraig Hampsey

=== All-Ireland Senior Football Championship ===
22 July; 7:00pm Round 4A	Donegal	0-14 – 4-17	Galway	Markievicz Park, Sligo; Attendance: 10,564; Referee: Anthony Nolan (Wicklow); Man of the Match: Johnny Heaney (Killanin)
22 July; 7:00pm Round 4A	Paddy McBrearty 0-6 (2f), Michael Murphy 0-4 (3f, 1 '45), Martin O’Reilly 0-2, Martin McElhinney 0-1, Michael Langan 0-1	Report	Johnny Heaney 2-2, Sean Armstrong 0-6 (4f), Liam Silke 1-0 (pen), Danny Cummins 1-0, Gary O’Donnell 0-2, Shane Walsh 0-1, Paul Conroy 0-1, Ian Burke 0-1, Damien Comer 0-1, Eamonn Brannigan 0-2, Michael Daly 0-1	Markievicz Park, Sligo; Attendance: 10,564; Referee: Anthony Nolan (Wicklow); Man of the Match: Johnny Heaney (Killanin)

== Management team ==
- Selector: Brendan Kilcoyne
- Coach: Richard Thornton, appointed for the 2017 season
- Strength and conditioning coach: Paul Fisher

== Awards ==
=== Footballer of the Year ===
Patrick McBrearty

=== GAA.ie Football Team of the Week ===
Included:

- 27 February: Michael Murphy
- 6 March: Paddy McGrath, Ciarán Thompson
- 20 March: Paddy McGrath, Ciarán Thompson, Ryan McHugh; McHugh nominated for, and selected as, Footballer of the Week
- 28 March: Michael Murphy; selected as, Footballer of the Week
- 3 April: Michael Murphy
- 22 May: Paddy McGrath, Frank McGlynn, Ciarán Thompson
- 19 June: Patrick McBrearty
- 24 July: Patrick McBrearty

=== All Stars ===
One nomination, for Patrick McBrearty.
