= Niall O'Donnell =

Donegal Gaelic footballer (born 1998)

Personal information
- Native name: Néill Ó Domhnaill (Irish)
- Born: 1998 (age 27–28)
- Occupation: Permanent TSB employee
- Height: 5 ft 11 in (180 cm)

Sport
- Sport: Gaelic football
Club
- Years: Club
- 2015–: St Eunan's
Club titles
- Donegal titles: 2
Inter-county
- Years: County
- 2018–: Donegal
- Ulster titles: 3

Niall O'Donnell (born 1998) is an Irish Gaelic footballer who plays for St Eunan's and the Donegal county team.

The Irish Independent's Colm Keys named O'Donnell among his "18 for [20]18: The brightest young talents" in Gaelic football, describing him as "both elusive and skilful". He is the younger brother of Conor O'Donnell Snr, the eldest of the St Eunan's Conor O'Donnells.

== Education ==
O'Donnell attended St Eunan's College, where he played for the school team. In 2016, following his Ulster minor title with Donegal, he became the eighth student from the school to win an Ulster Colleges All Star, succeeding — among others — Michael Murphy and Shaun Patton; O'Donnell played alongside Patton in the school team.

== Playing career ==
=== Club ===
O'Donnell captained his club at under-21 level. He played in county finals at under-12, under-14, under-16, minor, under-21 and senior levels.

He made his senior debut for his club as a replacement for John Haran in the remaining two minutes of the final of the 2015 Donegal Senior Football Championship, which his club lost by one point against Naomh Conaill. He later said: "I got one touch. I just laid it off. I was a bit young to be taking a big shot on then".

O'Donnell's brother Conor also plays alongside him for the club. As does his brother Shane.

O'Donnell, a dual player, has also played hurling for his club. He played from the start in, and scored in, the 2017 Donegal Senior Hurling Championship final.

He captained his club to the 2021 Donegal Senior Football Championship, aged 23, scoring three points in the final. O'Donnell then won the 2024 Donegal Senior Football Championship with his club, scoring two points including one free in the final.

=== Inter-county ===
==== Minor ====
O'Donnell was part of the team that reached the 2016 All-Ireland Minor Football Championship semi-final. He was joint-captain of the Donegal minor team with Jason McGee.

==== Senior ====
O'Donnell first featured for his county at senior level under the management of Declan Bonner. He played against Kerry as a half-time substitute in the opening fixture of the 2018 National Football League at Fitzgerald Stadium.

He did not feature on the pitch when Donegal won the 2018 Ulster Senior Football Championship, as, alongside Jason McGee, he had decided to drop down to play with the under-20 team instead.

Donegal qualified for the 2019 National Football League Division 2 final and O'Donnell started the game and scored two points as Donegal defeated Meath to win the title.

O'Donnell played for the first 42 minutes in the final of the 2019 Ulster Senior Football Championship against Cavan, scoring one point and claiming his first Ulster senior title. He had made a substitute appearance against Fermanagh in the quarter-final and started in the semi-final win over Tyrone.

O'Donnell did not feature in Donegal's opening fixture of the 2020 National Football League against Mayo. He made a substitute appearance in the second game against Meath, scoring a point. He made three further substitute appearances against Galway, Dublin and Monaghan. Then the COVID-19 pandemic brought play to a halt. Play resumed behind closed doors on 18 October with a home game against Tyrone; O'Donnell started that game and scored two points. He also made a substitute appearance in the concluding game of the league campaign (away to Kerry). O'Donnell then started the 2020 Ulster Senior Football Championship victory against Tyrone. He also started the semi-final victory against Armagh, scoring two points (one of which was a mark). He scored two points in the final against Cavan, in what proved to be the season's concluding game for his team.

O'Donnell started each of Donegal's four fixtures of the 2021 National Football League (against Tyrone, Monaghan, Armagh and Dublin), scoring one point against Tyrone, two points against Monaghan, one point (from a free) against Armagh and one point against Dublin. He started each of Donegal's three fixtures of the 2021 Ulster Senior Football Championship, scoring a point against Down, three points against Derry and two points against Tyrone.

O'Donnell made substitute appearances in the opening fixture of the 2022 National Football League, against Mayo, and in the third fixture, against Kerry. He started the fourth fixture, against Tyrone. He made a substitute appearance in the final game against Armagh. In the 2022 Ulster Senior Football Championship, O'Donnell made substitute appearances in each of Donegal's three fixtures, the quarter-final against Armagh, the semi-final against Cavan and the final against Derry (which included extra-time, during which he played). He made a late substitute appearance in the 2022 All-Ireland Senior Football Championship qualifier loss to Armagh, during which he scored a point.

== Personal life ==
As of 2021, Permanent TSB in Letterkenny employed O'Donnell.

== Honours ==
Donegal

- Ulster Senior Football Championship: 2019, 2024, 2025
- National Football League Division 2: 2019, 2024
- Ulster Minor Football Championship: 2016

St Eunan's

- Donegal Senior Football Championship: 2021 (c), 2024
- Donegal Under-21 Football Championship: 2018, 2019
- Donegal Minor Football Championship: 2015

Individual

- Ulster Colleges All Star: 2016
- Donegal News Sports Personality Award: December 2015
- Player of the Tournament — St Paul's Ulster Minor Football Tournament: 2015
