= Mark McGowan (Gaelic footballer) =

Irish Gaelic footballer

Personal information
- Born: 31 May 1988 (age 38) County Donegal, Ireland
- Occupation: Civil engineer

Sport
- Sport: Gaelic football
Club
- Years: Club
- 200?–2014: St Eunan's
Club titles
- Donegal titles: 5
Inter-county
- Years: County
- 2008–2014: Donegal

Mark McGowan (born 31 May 1988) is an Irish former Gaelic footballer who played for St Eunan's and, at all levels, the Donegal county team.

Known for his defensive play, he could also play further forward in attack and was considered tailor-made for "The System" deployed by Jim McGuinness.

Considered the best left cornerback in his age group in the province of Ulster in 2006, a persistent hip injury forced him to retire from the game at the age of just 25.

== Early life ==
McGowan was educated at St Eunan's College. In 2007, in his final year at school, he was part of a team that won a silver medal at the All-Ireland Higher Maths national finals, a competition for Higher Level Mathematic students. He, of course, played Gaelic football for each of the school's teams, where his preference was for defence and his favourite position was left cornerback. His anticipation and ability to read the flow of a game along with his speed were noted as assets to his game.

== Playing career ==
=== Club ===
McGowan won five Donegal Senior Football Championships with his club. He came on as a substitute in the 2007 final, and started the 2008 and 2009 finals as his team completed a three-in-a-row sweep.

He scored the winner in freak circumstances in the 2012 final. With the team level Brendan McDyre of opponents Naomh Conaill attempted to backpass to his goalkeeper Stephen McGrath only for the ball to drift out for a '45'. McGowan stepped up to punish. As the game ended he was photographed celebrating—stooped, wild-eyed with open mouth, sweat-soaked, bare thighs tensed, veins throbbing, mud-stained legs apart and clenched fists turned upwards. McGowan was just as influential in the next game, the Ulster quarter-final, and opponents Crossmaglen Rangers struggled to deal with him as he swept away all before him at Armagh's Athletic Grounds.

=== Inter-county ===
McGowan won a Buncrana Cup with the U-16 Donegal football team.

McGowan played in the final as Donegal won their first Ulster minor title in 10 years at Croke Park in 2006. He was part of Donegal's under-21 campaign in 2009. He has also lined out for UCD's team. McGowan was drafted into the Donegal senior squad for the first time in 2008. He played in a Senior Championship game against Roscommon that summer.

McGowan declined to join up with Donegal in 2011 due to prior commitments in the United States. Jim McGuinness said, "We would have liked to have Mark McGowan, too, but unfortunately he had already commitments in the States."

However, McGuinness called McGowan back into the Donegal squad for 2013. He then sent him away again.

In January 2014, it all became clear. On the third day of that month it was reported that McGowan had been forced to retire from the game at the age of 25. He did so on medical advice he had received since having hip surgery in Santry in February 2012.

== Honours ==
- Ulster All-Star (school): 200?
- Buncrana Cup: 20??
- Ulster Minor Football Championship: 2006
- Donegal Senior Football Championship: 2007, 2008, 2009, 2012, 2014
