= Eamonn Doherty =

Irish Gaelic footballer (born 1990/91)

Personal information
- Native name: Éamonn Ó Dochartaigh (Irish)
- Born: 1990/1 Letterkenny, County Donegal, Ireland
- Occupation: Secondary school teacher
- Height: 6 ft 0 in (183 cm)

Sport
- Sport: Gaelic football
- Position: Back
Club
- Years: Club
- 2007–: St Eunan's
Club titles
- Donegal titles: 7
Inter-county
- Years: County
- 2013–: Donegal
- Ulster titles: 2

Eamonn Doherty (born 1990/1) is an Irish Gaelic footballer who plays for St Eunan's and the Donegal county team.

He is a secondary school teacher in Buncrana.

== Playing career ==
=== Club ===
Eamonn Doherty started his club's winning senior county finals in 2007, 2009 and 2012 and came on as a substitute in 2008. This was all by the age of 24 and national media referred to him as "one of the most decorated players in the north-west". He made a second-half substitute appearance in the final as his club won the 2021 Donegal Senior Football Championship. While his club won the 2024 Donegal Senior Football Championship, Doherty did not play in the final, but did play in the semi-final.

=== Inter-county ===
Doherty played for Donegal throughout the 2010 Ulster Under-21 Football Championship campaign, a competition which Donegal won. He then played in the final of the 2010 All-Ireland Under-21 Football Championship, which Donegal (managed by Jim McGuinness) narrowly lost to Dublin (managed by Jim Gavin). Himself, Antoin McFadden, James Carroll and Declan Walsh transferred to Boston for the summer in 2011.

McGuinness gave Doherty his senior league debut came against Dublin in Ballybofey in the final game of the 2013 National Football League, having only called him up days earlier. He made an immediate impact, colliding with the referee, leaving him flattened in a heap and taking him out of the game.

Doherty started Rory Gallagher's first match in charge of the county, a 2015 Dr McKenna Cup away defeat to Derry. Having flattened the referee in a heap and taken him out of the game, Doherty did not play in the National Football League again until 2015, his second appearance also coming against Dublin. That year, he featured in six of Donegal's eight National Football League Division One fixtures and started at Croke Park against Galway in the Championship when Karl Lacey did not recover from an injury in time.

Doherty started the opening fixture of the 2016 National Football League away to Down. He then started the second fixture against Cork, a ten-point win in Ballyshannon. He also started the third, fourth and fifth fixtures against Mayo, Kerry and Roscommon. He made a late substitute appearance in the seventh fixture, away to Monaghan in Castleblayney.

Doherty made a late substitute appearance in the 2016 All-Ireland Senior Football Championship qualifier defeat of Cork at Croke Park.

Doherty made a substitute appearance in the opening fixture of the 2017 National Football League against Kerry. He also made substitute appearances in the second, third and fourth fixtures against Roscommon, Dublin and Cavan. He started the fifth, sixth and seventh fixtures against Tyrone, Monaghan and Mayo.

Doherty made a substitute appearance in the 2017 Ulster Senior Football Championship semi-final against Tyrone.

Doherty scored a point against Tyrone in the 2018 National Football League.

Though restricted to substitute appearances for much of the competition, Doherty lifted the Anglo-Celt Cup as Donegal secured the 2018 Ulster Senior Football Championship. He made his two substitute appearances in the preliminary round against Cavan and the semi-final against Down. He started against Dublin in the 2018 All-Ireland Senior Football Championship, scoring a point at Croke Park as his county gave the reigning All-Ireland champions their toughest test since the previous year's All-Ireland final.

Doherty started against Clare in the opening fixture of the 2019 National Football League in Ennis. He also featured in the second fixture against Meath, the fourth fixture against Fermanagh and the sixth fixture against Cork, all from the start. Donegal qualified for the National Football League Division 2 final and Doherty made a substitute appearance in the game as Donegal defeated Meath to win the title.

He made a late substitute appearance in the 2019 Ulster Senior Football Championship quarter-final victory over Fermanagh, though he did not feature in the semi-final victory over Tyrone or in the final against Cavan, which Donegal won. Then, with Neil McGee injured, Doherty came in from the start in Donegal's 2019 All-Ireland Senior Football Championship quarter-final meeting with Kerry at Croke Park.

== Personal life ==
Doherty is from Letterkenny. He took up a position as a secondary school teacher in Buncrana, having completed his degree at Dublin City University (DCU) in 2013. In his first year as a qualified teacher one of his students was Darach O'Connor, who started the 2014 All-Ireland Senior Football Championship Final.

Doherty's brother Niall, an accountant, has served as treasurer of the St Eunan's club.

As of June 2020, Doherty was living in Letterkenny.

== Honours ==
Donegal

- Ulster Senior Football Championship: 2018 2019
- National Football League Division 2: 2019
- All-Ireland Under-21 Football Championship runner-up: 2010
- Ulster Under-21 Football Championship: 2010

St Eunan's

- Donegal Senior Football Championship: 2007, 2008, 2009, 2012, 2014, 2021, 2024
