= Conor Parke =

Irish dual player

Personal information
- Nickname: Parky
- Born: 1993 or 1994 (age 32–33) Letterkenny, County Donegal, Ireland
- Height: 5 ft 11 in (180 cm)

Sport
- Sport: Dual player
- Position: Corner back
Club
- Years: Club
- 2011–: St Eunan's
Club titles
- Donegal titles: 2
College(s)
- Years: College
- ? 2011–2015: St Eunan's College; Letterkenny Institute of Technology
Inter-county
Years	County	Apps (scores)
2015 2019–present	Donegal (F); Donegal (H)	1 (0–00); 8 (0–00)

Conor Parke (born around 1994) is a dual player. He plays Gaelic football and hurling for St Eunan's, as well as hurling for the Donegal county team.

Parke has two Donegal Senior Football Championships with his club, won in 2012 and 2014. He scored a point in the 2014 final.

Under the management of Rory Gallagher, Parke received a call-up to the Donegal senior football panel in late 2014. He started Gallagher's first match in charge, a 2015 Dr McKenna Cup away defeat to Derry. He is a former under-21 player for the county football team.

Parke played hurling for Donegal in the 2019 Christy Ring Cup.

== Honours ==
=== County ===
- Ulster Senior Football Championship runner-up: 2015
- Ulster Under-21 Football Championship runner-up: 2013, 2014, 2015

=== Club ===
Football

- Donegal Senior Football Championship: 2012, 2014
- Donegal Under-21 Football Championship: 2014
- Donegal Minor Football Championship: 2011

Hurling

- Donegal Senior Hurling Championship runner-up: 2017
- Donegal Under-21 Hurling Championship: 2015
- Donegal Minor Hurling Championship: 2011
