= Shaun Doherty =

Fr. Shaun Doherty
- Born: Shaun Doherty; 20 August 1964 (age 62); Stoke-on-Trent, England
- Presenting career
- Style: Radio presenter
- Country: Ireland
- Previous show: The Shaun Doherty Show

Fr. Shaun Doherty (Irish: Seán Ó Dochartaigh; born 20 August 1964 in Stoke-on-Trent) is an Irish Catholic priest and former radio presenter with Highland Radio, based in Letterkenny, County Donegal, Ireland.

Although Doherty is English-born, Fr. Shaun's father was a native of Inishowen.

== The Shaun Doherty Show ==
He presented The Shaun Doherty Show, on Highland Radio from 1990 until his resignation on 14 July 2017. The show won a PPI Radio Award in 2001 and Doherty was nominated for broadcaster of the year in 2006. The show was produced by Caroline Orr and Ciara Johnston and assisted by Marion Potts.
