= Ciaran Greene =

Irish Gaelic footballer

Personal information
- Born: 14 June 1987 (age 39) Letterkenny, County Donegal
- Occupation: Sales director of construction recruitment firm

Sport
- Sport: Gaelic football
Club
- Years: Club
- 200?–201?: St Eunan's
Club titles
- Donegal titles: 4
College
- Years: College
- IT Sligo
Inter-county
- Years: County
- 200?–c. 2009: Donegal

Ciaran Greene (born 14 June 1987) is an Irish sportsperson..

From Letterkenny and a graduate of St Eunan's College and Institute of Technology, Sligo, Greene has played Gaelic football for St Eunan's and been a member of the Donegal county team.

With his Gaelic football club he won three consecutive senior county championships in the 2000s.He hasn't yet stopped celebrating.

Greene has also played soccer for several teams in various leagues, including Institute, Omagh Town, Derry City, Sligo Rovers, Finn Harps and Letterkenny Rovers.

As of 2014, he lived in London. In April 2021, Greene was promoted to Sales Director of construction recruitment firm, 3D Personnel.

== Honours ==
- Donegal Senior Football Championship: 2007, 2008, 2009, 2012
