= Lurgy (river) =

River in County Donegal, Ireland

Coordinates: 55°02′08″N 7°45′53″W

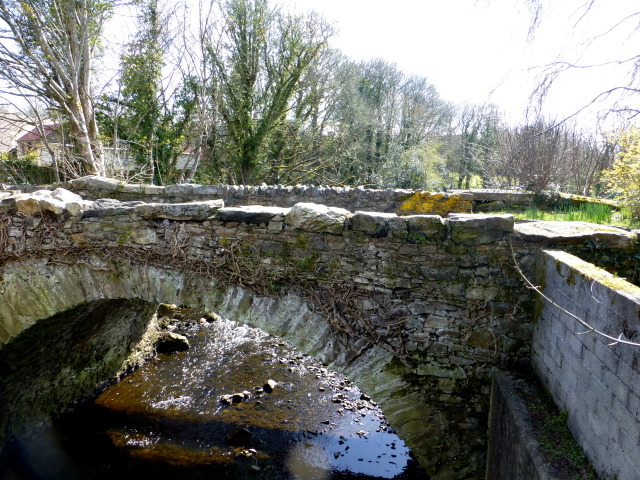
Bridge across the Lurgy River at Kilmacrennan

The Lurgy (Irish: An Lorgaigh) is a small river in County Donegal, Ireland. It flows into the River Lennon near Kilmacrennan. The river is also a Natura 2000 protected site.

The football pitch of Kilmacrennan Celtic, Lurgy Park, is located on the banks of the river. Irish Water were fined €7,000 by the Environmental Protection Agency in February 2023 over failures to upgrade overloaded waste treatment facilities that spilled into the river and had toxic effects on fish and aquatic life.
