= Mark Crossan =

Irish Gaelic footballer

Sport
- Sport: Gaelic football
Club
- Years: Club
- 199?–200?: St Eunan's
Club titles
- Donegal titles: 2
Inter-county
- Years: County
- 199?–200?: Donegal
Inter-county titles
- Ulster titles: 1
- All-Irelands: 1

Mark Crossan is an Irish former Gaelic footballer who played for St Eunan's and the Donegal county team. He also captained his county.

== Biography ==
Crossan is from Letterkenny. He attended St Eunan's College, where he played for the school team.

Crossan is an All-Ireland winner with Donegal, one of three representatives from his club on the county panel that won the 1992 All-Ireland Senior Football Championship Final. He also won a Railway Cup with Ulster in 2000. He was also in the Ireland international rules football team in 2000.

He made his championship debut for Donegal against Armagh in 1993. With Donegal he also reached the All-Ireland semi-final in 2003. With his club, he has won the Donegal Senior Football Championship twice.

He started Mickey Moran's first game in charge of Donegal, a league win at home to Offaly in October 2000.

Since retiring from the game, he has been coaching.

== Honours ==
- All-Ireland Senior Football Championship: 1992
- Ulster Senior Football Championship: 1992
- Railway Cup: 2000
- Donegal Senior Football Championship: 1999, 2001
