= John Hannigan =

Irish Gaelic footballer

Personal information
- Born: 1938/9
- Died: 22 April 2014 (aged 75) Dublin, Ireland
- Occupation: Psychiatric nurse

Sport
- Sport: Gaelic football
Club
- Years: Club
- 19??–?: St Eunan's
Inter-county
Years	County	Apps (scores)
c. 1958–c. 1973	Donegal	114
- Ulster titles: 1

John Hannigan (1938/9 – 22 April 2014) was an Irish Gaelic footballer who played for St Eunan's and the Donegal county team.

A versatile player, Hannigan began his career in midfield but played everywhere from corner back to corner-forward.

He played as corner forward in the final of the 1956 Ulster Minor Football Championship, which Donegal won.

He played 114 times for Donegal and made 27 Championship appearances between 1958 and 1973.

Hannigan played for Donegal in the 1964–65 National Football League semi-final against Kerry, scoring 1–0.

He won the 1972 Ulster Senior Football Championship with Donegal.

Hannigan managed Donegal in 1975 and 1976. He also pursued an interest in golf.

Hannigan died in Dublin aged 75 after suffering a heart attack in April 2014. Married to Claire, they had a son Damien and a daughter Adrianne. He is buried at Conwal Cemetery.

== Honours ==
Donegal

- Ulster Senior Football Championship: 1972
- Ulster Minor Football Championship: 1956
- Dr McKenna Cup: 1963, 1965, 1967
- Dr Lagan Cup: 1965, 1966, 1967
- Donegal Senior Football Championship x5
- Democrat Cup x3
