= Gareth Gorman =

Irish footballer (born 1974)

Personal information
- Date of birth: 14 June 1974 (age 52)
- Place of birth: Letterkenny, Ireland
- Position: Midfielder

Senior career*
Years	Team	Apps	(Gls)
- Derry City
- Letterkenny Rovers
- Galway United
- Finn Harps
- Sligo Rovers

Managerial career
- 2006: Sligo Rovers (assistant)
- 2009: Dundalk (assistant)
- 2010–2011: Galway United (assistant)
- * Club domestic league appearances and goals

Gareth Gorman (born 14 June 1974) is an Irish former footballer.

== Playing career ==
Gareth played in the League of Ireland for 10 years, at various clubs, finishing his career at Sligo Rovers.

== Coaching career ==
Appointed as Sean Connor's assistant at Galway United before the 2010 League of Ireland season.
