= Ross Wherity =

Irish sportsperson

Personal information
- Native name: Ross Ó Fabhartaigh (Irish)
- Born: Letterkenny, Ireland
- Height: 1.91 m (6 ft 3 in)

Sport
- Sport: Gaelic football
- Position: Left Half Forward
Club
- Years: Club
- 2006–: St Eunan's
Club titles
- Donegal titles: 2
Inter-county
- Years: County
- 2009–2013 2014–: Donegal; New York
Inter-county titles
- Ulster titles: 0
- All-Irelands: 0
- NFL: 0
- All Stars: 0

Ross Wherity

Personal information
- Full name: Ross Ó Fabhartaigh
- Born: County Donegal, Ireland
- Original team: Donegal (Gaelic football)

Club information
- Current club: St Eunan's

Playing career
Years	Club	Games (Goals)
?–	St Eunan's	

Ross Wherity is an Irish sportsperson. A Gaelic footballer with the St Eunan's club, he has been a member of the Donegal county team at under-21, minor and senior levels.

Known for his tendency not to settle with one team (or even one sport), Wherity has also been in Australia to play Australian rules football, in Poland as part of an attempt to make it at a major soccer tournament and was last known to be playing Championship football for the New York county team.

== Playing career ==
=== Club ===
For his club Wherity has played and scored in the Ulster Senior Club Football Championship, where his team have progressed as far as the semi-finals. His play for his club has been praised by former Armagh manager Joe Kernan. He has enjoyed great success with the Letterkenny club with four Donegal Senior Football Championship medals to his name but he was in New York for their most recent victory in 2014. He was missing after going to Poland for UEFA Euro 2012.

=== Inter-county ===
He scored as Donegal won a first Ulster Minor Football Championship in 10 years at Croke Park in 2006. He also impressed for the Donegal U-21 team.

He scored a goal for the county senior team in the 2009 Dr McKenna Cup. He was also on the 2010 Dr McKenna Cup team.

He returned to the Donegal team for the 2013 National Football League, immediately thrown into the starting line-up for the opening game against Kildare at Croke Park due to an injury suffered by Mark McHugh. Fouled in the fifth minute, with captain Michael Murphy popping over the resulting free, he then spent the remainder of the game tripping and falling over a lot on his face. He started the next game as well, a home tie against Down, and from the full forward position ended with a final total of one point. In the third game of Donegal's league campaign, against Tyrone at Healy Park, he tripped and fell over himself in the opposition penalty area shortly before half-time, just before Donegal captain Michael Murphy was sent off. Minus Murphy for the second half (meaning he was one of Donegal's main attacking threats left on the field of play), he was through on goal at one point but scuffed a shot wide; Donegal lost. In the fourth game of Donegal's league campaign, against Kerry, he was knocked over yet again and another penalty given, which Murphy scored.

=== Move to New York ===
In 2013, Wherity absconded from Donegal, fled Ireland and took up residence in Big Apple, New York. Despite expectations that he would return for their Championship meeting with Malin, Wherity disappointed Naomh Adhamhnáin by failing to make it out of the ranch; the round ended with a shock defeat and knock-out for the Letterkenny men against their more northerly opponents.

You are moving to one of the best cities, the craziest cities in the world. You need football there in your life to keep you sane I think. You're out partying and all that kind of stuff, but to get back down to the hard work it's good to be grounded and have the lads around you. It's a great network as well to have, to be able to rely upon all the boys there. Jobs-wise, it's good for that there as well, contacts in the city, there is a lot of influence within the football. It is a great thing to have.

Since moving stateside Wherity has become one of the "well-known names on the New York side" that competes in the Connacht Senior Football Championship, according to the Irish Independent.

== Honours ==
- Ulster Minor Football Championship: 2006
- Donegal Senior Football Championship: 2007, 2008, 2009, 2012
