= 2021 Donegal Senior Football Championship =

Donegal S.F.C.
- Season: 2021
- Champions: St Eunan's (15th title)
- Winning captain: Niall O'Donnell
- Man of the Match: Shane O'Donnell
- Winning manager: Rory Kavanagh
- Matches: 46

The 2021 Donegal Senior Football Championship was the 99th official edition of Donegal GAA's premier Gaelic football tournament for senior graded clubs in County Donegal. 16 teams competed, with the winner representing Donegal in the Ulster Senior Club Football Championship.

Naomh Conaill was defending champion after defeating Cill Chartha in a penalty competition held after extra-time of the 2020 final.

Naomh Conaill advanced to the 2021 final, but lost to St Eunan's.

== Team changes ==
The following teams changed division since the 2020 championship season.

=== To S.F.C. ===
Promoted from 2020 Donegal I.F.C.

- Aodh Ruadh - (I.F.C. Champions)

=== From S.F.C. ===
Relegated to 2021 Donegal I.F.C.

- ?

== League stage ==
The competition began with a league stage. The draw for the first two rounds was held in June 2021, with the identity of the 2020 Championship winner still unknown, a first such event in the competition's history.

=== Table ===
Pos	Team	P	W	L	D	F	A	PD	Pts	Qualification
1	CLG Chill Chartha	4	4	0	0	73	29	+44	8	Advance to Quarter-finals
2	Naomh Conaill	4	3	0	1	65	42	+23	7	Advance to Quarter-finals
3	Gaoth Dobhair	4	3	1	0	81	50	+31	6	Advance to Quarter-finals
4	St Eunan's	4	3	1	0	66	42	+24	6	Advance to Quarter-finals
5	CLG Naomh Náille	4	3	1	0	60	44	+16	6	Advance to Quarter-finals
6	St Michael's	4	3	1	0	59	59	+0	6	Advance to Quarter-finals
7	Aodh Ruadh Ballyshannon	4	2	1	1	63	26	+7	5	Advance to Quarter-finals
8	Seán Mac Cumhaills	4	2	2	0	62	52	+8	4	Advance to Quarter-finals
9	Gleann Fhinne	4	2	2	0	50	45	+5	4	Advance to Relegation Playoff
10	Gleann tSúilí	4	2	2	0	56	52	+4	4	Advance to Relegation Playoff
11	Réalt na Mara	4	1	3	0	53	58	-5	2	Advance to Relegation Playoff
12	CLG Na Cealla Beaga	4	1	3	0	47	67	-20	2	Advance to Relegation Playoff
13	Ardara	4	1	3	0	45	69	-24	2	Advance to Relegation Playoff
14	Milford	4	1	3	0	51	83	-32	2	Advance to Relegation Playoff
15	Termon	4	0	4	0	40	75	-35	0	Advance to Relegation Playoff
16	Four Masters	4	0	4	0	33	79	-46	0	Advance to Relegation Playoff

=== Fixtures ===
Round 1

12 September 2021; 13:30	Na Cealla Beaga	1–7 — 1–13	Glenswilly	Eamonn Byrne Memorial Park; Man of the Match: ???

12 September 2021; 15:00	Ard an Rátha	1–10 — 2–6	Réalt na Mara	Pearse Memorial Park; Man of the Match: ???

12 September 2021; 15:30	Gaoth Dobhair	4–21 — 2–7	Milford	Machaire Gathlán; Man of the Match: ???

12 September 2021; 18:00	St Eunan's	1–12 — 1–14	Kilcar	O'Donnell Park; Man of the Match: ???

18 September 2021; 14:00	Naomh Conaill	0–11 — 0–08	Glenfin	Davy Brennan Memorial Park; Man of the Match: ???
18 September 2021; 14:00		National report Local report		Davy Brennan Memorial Park; Man of the Match: ???

19 September 2021; 14:00	St Naul's	1–11 — ?–??	Termon	Páirc Gearoid Ó'Gallochoir; Man of the Match: ???
19 September 2021; 14:00		Report		Páirc Gearoid Ó'Gallochoir; Man of the Match: ???

19 September 2021; 14:00	Four Masters	?–?? — ?–??	Aodh Ruadh	Páirc Tírconaill; Man of the Match: ???

19 September 2021; 16:00	Seán MacCumhaills	2–06 — 1–11	St Michael's	Páirc Sheáin MhicCumhaill; Man of the Match: Colm McFadden

Round 2

25 September 2021; 15:00	Milford	1–15 — 1–13	Ard an Rátha	Moyle Park; Man of the Match: ???
25 September 2021; 15:00		Report		Moyle Park; Man of the Match: ???

25 September 2021; 15:30	St Michael's	1–08 — 2–17	Gaoth Dobhair	The Bridge; Man of the Match: ???

25 September 2021; 16:00	Termon	?–?? — ?–??	St Eunan's	Termon; Man of the Match: ???

25 September 2021; 16:30	Réalt na Mara	1–18 — ?–??	Na Cealla Beaga	Gaelic Park; Man of the Match: ???
25 September 2021; 16:30		Report		Gaelic Park; Man of the Match: ???

26 September 2021; 14:00	Glenswilly	?–?? — ?–??	Seán MacCumhaills	Páirc Naomh Columba; Man of the Match: ???

26 September 2021; 14:00	Glenfin	1–09 — 0–11	St Naul's	Páirc Tabhoige; Man of the Match: ???
26 September 2021; 14:00		Report		Páirc Tabhoige; Man of the Match: ???

26 September 2021; 14:00	Aodh Ruadh	1–10 — 2–07	Naomh Conaill	Fr Tierney Park; Man of the Match: ???
26 September 2021; 14:00		Report		Fr Tierney Park; Man of the Match: ???

26 September 2021; 17:30	Kilcar	1–17 — 0–03	Four Masters	Páirc Taobhoige; Man of the Match: ???
26 September 2021; 17:30		Report		Páirc Taobhoige; Man of the Match: ???

Round 3

The Round 3 draw was made on 26 September, giving the following fixtures: Ard an Rátha v Kilcar, Seán MacCumhaills v Réalt na Mara, Naomh Conaill v Termon, St Naul's v Glenswilly, Gaoth Dobhair v Glenfin, Na Cealla Beaga v Milford, St Eunan's v Aodh Ruadh and Four Masters v St Michael's.

- Ard an Rátha v Kilcar Report
- Seán MacCumhaills v Réalt na Mara Report
- Naomh Conaill v Termon Report
- St Naul's v Glenswilly
- Gaoth Dobhair v Glenfin Report Report
- Na Cealla Beaga v Milford Report
- St Eunan's v Aodh Ruadh
- Four Masters v St Michael's

Round 4

The Round 4 draw was made in early October, giving the following fixtures: Kilcar v Gaoth Dobhair, Aodh Ruadh v Ard an Rátha, Réalt na Mara v St Eunan's, Termon v Seán MacCumhaills, Glenswilly v Naomh Conaill, St Michael's v Na Cealla Beaga, Glenfin v Four Masters and Milford v St Naul's. Three clubs had by then advanced to the knockout stages – Gaoth Dobhair, Kilcar and Naomh Conaill. Going into Round 4, played on the weekend of October 9, St Eunan's, Glenswilly, St Naul's, St Michael's and Aodh Ruadh sat in the remaining five places.

- St Michael's 3–10 — 1–07 Na Cealla Beaga
- Termon 1–12 — 1–18 Seán MacCumhaills Report
- Milford 0–09 — 2–16 St Naul's
- Réalt na Mara 1–07 — 0–14 St Eunan's
- Glenswilly 0–15 — 1–15 Naomh Conaill
- Aodh Ruadh 1–16 — 2–07 Ard an Rátha Report
- Glenfin 0–20 — 0–06 Four Masters Report
- Kilcar v Gaoth Dobhair ?

== Knock-out stage ==
=== Quarter-finals ===
Gaoth Dobhair and Naomh Conaill, the last two clubs to win the competition, were paired with each other in the quarter-final draw. Seán MacCumhaills and Kilcar met in the other quarter-final on that side of the draw. On the other side of the draw St Eunan's and St Naul's played each other in one quarter-final, while St Michael's and Aodh Ruadh played each other in the other quarter-final.

16 October 2021; Quarter-final	Kilcar	1–17 — 0–02	Seán MacCumhaills	Pearse Memorial Park, Ardara; Referee: Jimmy White (Killybegs); Man of the Match: ???
16 October 2021; Quarter-final		Report		Pearse Memorial Park, Ardara; Referee: Jimmy White (Killybegs); Man of the Match: ???

16? October 2021; Quarter-final	St Michael's	3–13 — 0–10	Aodh Ruadh	MacCumhaill Park; Referee: James Connors; Man of the Match: Michael Langan
16? October 2021; Quarter-final		https://www.donegallive.ie/news/sport/678798/st-michael-s-see-off-aodh-ruadh-to-seal-semi-final-spot.html		MacCumhaill Park; Referee: James Connors; Man of the Match: Michael Langan

17 October 2021; Quarter-final	St Eunan's	2–12 — 2–05	St Naul's	??? Referee: Mark Dorrian (Gael Fhánada); Man of the Match: ???
17 October 2021; Quarter-final		Report		??? Referee: Mark Dorrian (Gael Fhánada); Man of the Match: ???

17 October 2021; Quarter-final	Naomh Conaill	1–10 — 0–08	Gaoth Dobhair	MacCumhaill Park; Referee: Enda McFeely (St Mary's, Convoy); Man of the Match: ???
17 October 2021; Quarter-final		Report		MacCumhaill Park; Referee: Enda McFeely (St Mary's, Convoy); Man of the Match: ???

=== Semi-finals ===
The semi-final meeting of Kilcar and Naomh Conaill was shown live to a national audience on TG4. Naomh Conaill won, after a late Patrick McBrearty goal that would have brought the sides level, was ruled out.

23 October 2021; Semi-final	St Eunan's	0–10 — 0–05	St Michael's	MacCumhaill Park; Referee: Mark Dorrian (Gael Fhánada); Man of the Match: Mark Dorrian
23 October 2021; Semi-final		Report		MacCumhaill Park; Referee: Mark Dorrian (Gael Fhánada); Man of the Match: Mark Dorrian

24 October 2021; Semi-final	Naomh Conaill	0–11 — 0–8	Kilcar	O'Donnell Park; Referee: Enda McFeely (St Mary's, Convoy); Man of the Match: ???
24 October 2021; Semi-final		Report		O'Donnell Park; Referee: Enda McFeely (St Mary's, Convoy); Man of the Match: ???

=== Final ===
It was Naomh Conaill's fifth consecutive appearance in the final. The game was televised live on TG4. A minute's silence was held before the game in memory of Martin Griffin, whose sudden death occurred the previous day. St Eunan's won.

7 November 2021; 3:15pm Final	St Eunan's	1–11 — 0–4	Naomh Conaill	MacCumhaill Park; Referee: Enda McFeely (St Mary's, Convoy); Man of the Match: Shane O'Donnell
7 November 2021; 3:15pm Final		Report		MacCumhaill Park; Referee: Enda McFeely (St Mary's, Convoy); Man of the Match: Shane O'Donnell

== Relegation play-offs ==
Eight clubs (Glenfin, Glenswilly, Réalt na Mara, Ard an Rátha, Milford, Na Cealla Beaga, Termon and Four Masters) entered the draw for the relegation play-offs once the quarter-final line-up was confirmed.

== Ulster Senior Club Football Championship ==
St Eunan's advanced to the 2021 Ulster Senior Club Football Championship.

Watty Graham's knocked St Eunan's out of that competition with an injury time point from Danny Tallon winning the game at O'Donnell Park, despite St Eunan's scoring the only goal and leading for much of the game and Shaun Patton saving a penalty.

== Gradam Shéamuis Mhic Géidigh ==
Caolan Ward was named as the recipient of the annual Gradam Shéamuis Mhic Géidigh.

== Television rights ==
The following matches were broadcast live on national television, unless otherwise indicated:

Round	RTÉ	TG4
Semi-finals	—	Naomh Conaill v Kilcar
Final	—	St Eunan's v Naomh Conaill

== Statistics ==
=== Top scorers ===
Top scorer overall

Rank	Player	Club	Tally	Total
1	Kane Barrett	Milford	2–25	31
2	Michael Murphy	Glenswilly	0–28	28
2	Cian McEniff	Réalt na Mara	2–22	28
4	Oisín Gallen	Seán MacCumhaills	1–23	26
5	Gerard Ward	Glenfin	0–23	23
5	Philip Patton	Aodh Ruadh	0–23	23
7	Niall O'Donnell	St Eunan's	1–19	22
7	Charles McGuinness	Naomh Conaill	1–19	22
7	Patrick McBrearty	Kilcar	1–19	22
7	Stephen McBrearty	Kilcar	0–22	22
11	Michael Langan	St Michael's	2–15	21
11	Daire McDaid	Termon	1–18	21
13	Eoin McGeehin	St Eunan's	3–10	19
14	Peadar Mogan	St Naul's	0–18	18
15	Stefan Boyle	Ard an Rátha	2–11	17
15	C. J. Molloy	Ard an Rátha	2–11	17
15	Colm A. McFadden	St Michael's	1–14	17
15	Ryan McFadden	Termon	0–17	17
