= Eddie Brennan (Gaelic footballer) =

Irish Gaelic footballer

Sport
- Sport: Gaelic football
Clubs
- Years: Club
- ?–? ?–c. 2012: Drumcliffe–Rosses Point; St Eunan's
Club titles
- Donegal titles: 4
Inter-county
- Years: County
- ?–? 200?–200?: Sligo; Donegal

Eddie Brennan is a Gaelic footballer.

A former club footballer with St Eunan's in Letterkenny, with whom he has won numerous county championships, he previously played for Drumcliffe–Rosses Point, the Sligo county football team, and since moving to Donegal, the Donegal county football team. Brennan's transfer from Sligo to Donegal proved controversial, generating much media coverage and opposition from rival clubs. The dispute led to the final of the 2002 Donegal Senior Football Championship not being played until 2003.

He had stopped playing for his club by the time it won the 2014 Donegal Senior Football Championship.

He jointly managed the St Eunan's senior footballers with Barry Meehan in 2017.

He also managed St Naul's.

Downings appointed him as team trainer ahead of the 2020 season.

== Honours ==
- Donegal Senior Football Championship: 2007, 2008, 2009, 2012
