= Christopher Malseed =

Irish footballer (born 1986)

Personal information
- Date of birth: 29 July 1986 (age 40)
- Place of birth: Ireland
- Position: Midfielder

Senior career*
Years	Team	Apps	(Gls)
- Letterkenny Rovers
	Finn Harps	23	(4)
	Stirling Albion	2	(0)
- * Club domestic league appearances and goals

Christopher Malseed (born 29 July 1986) is an Irish former footballer.

== Career ==
Having signed for Scottish football team Stirling Albion in 2006, the midfielder has also played for Finn Harps and Letterkenny Rovers.
