= John D Ruddy =

Irish actor

John Ruddy
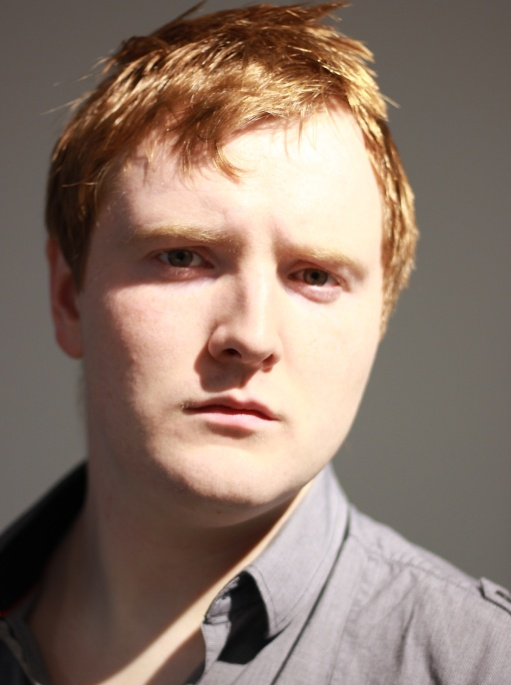
- Born: Letterkenny, Ireland
- Occupations: School teacher, actor, YouTuber

John D Ruddy is an Irish actor, artist, teacher and YouTuber.

== Personal life ==
Ruddy was born in Letterkenny, County Donegal.

== Career ==
=== Acting ===
Ruddy has been involved in a number of theatre productions in Ireland. His first notable role was in the multi-award-winning production of The 39 Steps directed by Pluincead Ó Fearraigh which toured across Ireland in September 2012.

He went on to play Billy McKeague in The Rising by Joe O'Byrne, a two-man play of a Protestant and a Catholic telling the story of the 1916 Easter Rising. The play premiered in the Powerscourt Theatre, Dublin in June 2012 and toured Ireland in 2013 and 2014.

Ruddy's performance was reviewed in The Irish Times where the reviewer stated that "Ruddy's characterisations – particularly his inner-city Concepta and, at times, his Pádraig Pearse – are so funny that they divert us guiltily from the weight of the lesson." Irish culture magazine Vulgo described Ruddy and his co-star Nick O'Connell as "exciting new talent" and "say that you saw the electric O'Connell and Ruddy here first" in their review of the show.

=== YouTube ===
Ruddy created the webcomic Manny Man 2010. The weekly strip poked fun at pop culture including Star Wars, Pokémon, Doctor Who and Game of Thrones.

He made his first historical animation, Irish History in 6 Minutes, in 2013 which went viral in Ireland. His subsequent videos covering World War I, World War II each amassed over a million views on YouTube.

Ruddy's animations have since been inducted into the Donegal County Museum.

=== Books ===
In addition to his animations, Ruddy is also an illustrator, and provided illustrations for Kieran Kelly's book, Letterkenny: Where the Winding Swilly Flows.

Ruddy also published two books of his own: Manny Man Does: Revolutionary Ireland and Manny Man Does: History of Ireland.
