= Jim Clarke (Gaelic footballer) =

Irish Gaelic footballer

Personal information
- Native name: Séamus Ó Cléirigh (Irish)

Sport
- Sport: Gaelic football
- Position: Full forward
Club
- Years: Club
- c. 1970s–?: St Eunan's
Inter-county
- Years: County
- c. 1970s–?: Donegal

Jim Clarke is an Irish former Gaelic footballer who played for St Eunan's and the Donegal county team.

He played for his county in the full-forward position at minor, under-21 and senior levels during the 1970s. He was full forward at senior level for his county.

Clarke has also been involved in coaching with his club. While still an under-21 player, he managed the club's under-15 and under-16 teams. In later life, he coached his club's "Sunday Morning Academy".
