= Daniel Collins (rower) =

Irish rower

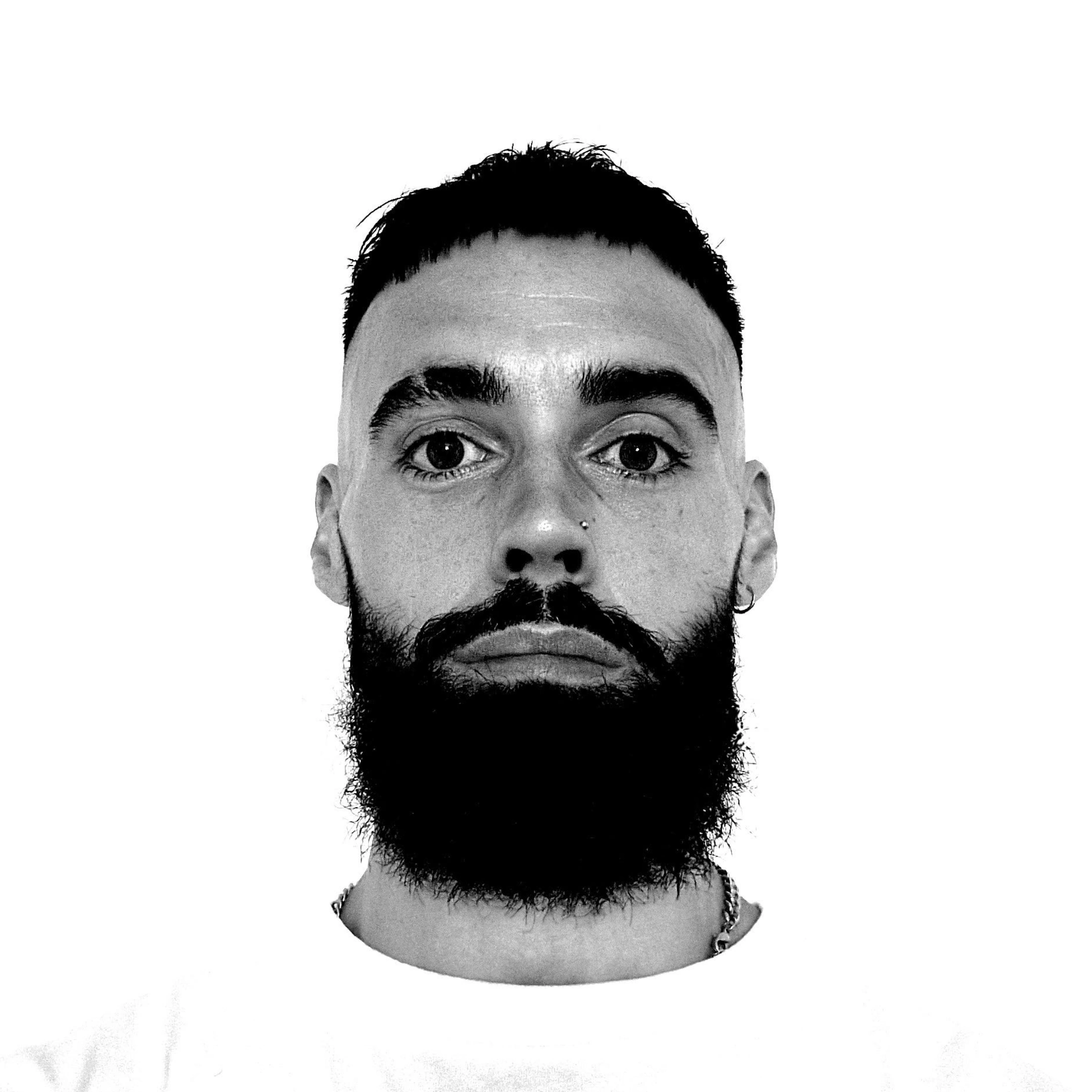

Personal information
- Full name: Daniel David Collins
- Nationality: Irish
- Born: 9 October 1985 (age 40) Letterkenny, County Donegal, Ireland
- Height: 1.85 m (6 ft 1 in)
- Weight: 85 kg (187 lb)

Sport
- Country: Ireland
- Sport: Rowing
- Weight class: Heavyweight
- Club: City of Derry Boating Club

Daniel Collins (Irish: Dainéil Ó Coileáin; born 9 October 1985) is an Irish indoor and on-water rower. He competes for the City of Derry Boating Club and has won a national title at the Irish Indoor Rowing Championships. He has also represented Ireland in the World Rowing Indoor Championships.

== Early life and education ==
Collins was born in Letterkenny, County Donegal, to Joyce Collins (née Hannon), a teacher from Ballaghaderreen, County Roscommon, and Daniel Francis "Frank" Collins, a solicitor from Aghyaran, near Castlederg in County Tyrone, Northern Ireland. He grew up on both sides of the Irish border: initially in Newtowncunningham, County Donegal, where he attended Scoil Cholmcille and played under-age Gaelic football for Naomh Colmcille CLG, and later in nearby Derry, where he completed his primary education at Ballougry Primary School before attending St Columb's College from 1997 to 2004.

In 2004, he moved to Dublin to study at Trinity College Dublin, graduating with a law degree in 2008. He was critical of the use of the term "Nordie" by some people in Dublin for its exclusionary implications and alienating effect on Irish northerners, having himself experienced being referred to as such while living there and viewing it as an example of othering. In 2009, he enrolled at North West Regional College back in Derry to complete a foundation diploma in art and design before moving to Manchester, England, in 2010 to attend Manchester Metropolitan University's School of Art, from which he graduated with a degree in fine art in 2013.

== Rowing career ==
=== Indoor rowing ===
Rowing for City of Derry at the 2025 Irish Indoor Rowing Championships in Limerick, Collins won gold in the men's 30–39 2,000m race and finished sixth in the men's open 500m. He later competed in the 2025 World Rowing Indoor Championships, representing Ireland in the men's open 2,000m event and ranking 61st in the world with a personal best time of 6:26.9. Collins also represented City of Derry and Ireland at the 2025 British Rowing Indoor Championships in Birmingham, England.

At the 2026 Irish Indoor Rowing Championships, Collins won silver in the men's 40–49 2,000m race and rowed the anchor leg of the senior mixed team 2,000m relay for a City of Derry crew of four (also including Mairéad Nic Bhloscaidh, Óisín Forde and Mark Buchanan) who finished in third position.

Weighing 85kg, he competes in the heavyweight (over 75kg) category.

=== On-water rowing ===
Collins began competing in on-water Rowing Ireland events with City of Derry in 2025. He made his debut in a coxed quad crew (with Martin Dooley, Desmond Brown and Gaetano D'Urso coxed by Amy) at the 2025 Erne Fours Head of the River in Enniskillen and also raced in a coxed club quad (with Martin Dooley, Desmond Brown and Tiarnan coxed by Amy) at the 2025 Lagan Autumn Head of the River in Belfast.

He raced in a double scull at the 2026 Lagan Head of the River (with Desmond Brown), the 2026 Sligo Head of the River on the River Garavogue (with Martin Dooley) and the 2026 Newry Head of the River on Newry Canal (with Desmond Brown). At the Sligo Sprint Regatta, he raced in a double scull (with Martin Dooley) and a coxed mixed quad (with Suzanne O'Kane, Desmond Brown and Maureen Brown coxed by Amy).

=== 2026 British Rowing Indoor Championships eligibility dispute ===
On 15 September 2026, Collins, backed by Foyle MP Colum Eastwood, publicly challenged British Rowing's modified entry requirements for the 2026 British Rowing Indoor Championships, for which competing and being ranked became restricted to British citizens due to that year's event being run concurrently with the World Rowing Indoor Championships. British Rowing deemed Collins eligible under their entry criteria - based on British citizenship law - through his Tyrone-born father, but due to Collins identifying solely as Irish, he objected to the requirement for athletes in his situation to declare themselves as British, citing the Good Friday Agreement's recognition of the right of people in Northern Ireland to identify and be accepted as Irish, British or both, whereby "by identifying as one or the other or both, that that decision should not impede their opportunities or their access to opportunities", and argued that the requirement placed him at a disadvantage compared to British-identifying fellow athletes connected by birth or descent to Northern Ireland because of his national identity.

Collins sought to enter as an Irish but was willing to compete under a "neutral" flag if necessary. British Rowing initially responded by insisting that their championships would operate as a national title event for British athletes, with athletes of other nationalities competing concurrently and being ranked in the 2026 WorId Rowing Indoor Championships. However, on 18 September, after British Minister for Sport Stephanie Peacock MP intrevened and lobbied British Rowing at the behest of Colum Eastwood, British Rowing announced that they would alter their entry criteria for athletes in Collins' situation. The organisation apologised to Collins and confirmed that he could "enter as Irish" and would "not need to declare [himself] as British to enter".

== Personal life ==
Collins was referred to the Western Health and Social Care Trust's eating disorder service in 2017 and was discharged in 2021, having spent two extended periods there. He has discussed in regional media interviews his long-term struggles with mental health, body dysmorphia and disordered eating prior to his rowing success and has described himself as "a firm advocate of a properly-funded public health service". His recovery journey was discussed by Danny Donnelly MLA during a March 2026 Private Members' Business debate on regional eating disorder services, introduced by Peter Martin MLA in the Northern Ireland Assembly to mark Eating Disorders Awareness Week 2026.

In 2025, Collins began assisting the Western Health and Social Care Trust and the Managed Care Network for Eating Disorders in Northern Ireland as a service user representative and lived-experience contributor, participating in regional workshops in Dungannon run by the network (to discuss strategy in respect of the co-ordination and delivery of eating disorder care and services) and the Regional Mental Health Service in Northern Ireland (to involve people with lived experience in the planning and delivery of mental health services).

He has also taken part in community events, including presenting Duke of Edinburgh's Award badges and addressing students, parents and staff about recovery, as well as building confidence and resilience, at Lisneal College in December 2025. In February 2026, he contributed a lived-experience testimony to a 2026 NI Science Festival event in Queen's University Belfast to discuss eating disorders in Northern Ireland and also addressed the Minister of Health, Mike Nesbitt, at an event in Stormont organised by the Managed Care Network for Eating Disorders in Northern Ireland to mark 20 years of eating disorder services in Northern Ireland and launch the network's strategic framework and three-year implementation plan, delivering another lived-experience testimony, as well as calling for increased funding for eating disorder services and sustained efforts to raise awareness and reduce stigma surrounding eating disorders among men. The launch event coincided with Eating Disorders Awareness Week 2026, for which Collins also produced a video testimony outlining his story and expressing appreciation to the eating disorder service for their help in his recovery journey.

He was a guest speaker during a March 2026 meeting of the Northern Ireland Assembly's All-Party Group on Eating Disorders and Disordered Eating chaired by Peter Martin MLA and spoke about his experiences while with the eating disorder service and since, as well as making another appeal for greater public funding for eating disorder services across the region. He attended Stormont again in June 2026 to participate in another All-Party Group meeting chaired by Peter Martin MLA and attended by vice-chairperson Jemma Dolan MLA, and he was part of a meeting again with the All-Party Group in September 2026.

Collins is 1.85 m in height and has a wingspan of 1.96 m. He is a first cousin of Irish former professional road racing cyclist and Beijing 2008 Olympian Philip Deignan and is a nephew of former Donegal county football team player Enda Bonner.

Collins is a supporter of Derry City F.C. and publicly defended Derry-born footballer James McClean both in his decision to represent the Republic of Ireland national football team and in response to criticism of McClean in Britain over the player's refusal to wear football shirts bearing the Royal British Legion's remembrance poppy while playing games on or around Remembrance Day.

Collins currently resides in Derry.

== Media coverage ==
Collins has been featured in the Derry Journal and covered by ITV News following his national championship win in 2025. He has also been feature interviewed on BBC Radio Foyle, where the presenter described his recovery journey as "remarkable". At the beginning of 2026, he appeared on BBC Radio Foyle again as part of a panel to discuss ways in which people might look after their wellbeing for the new year ahead. He was also interviewed by Jenna McCusker in September 2026 on the 'My Life & Me' podcast in an episode discussing his experiences of body dysmorphia and disordered eating along with his recovery and sporting journey.
