= Sean Ferriter =

Irish Gaelic footballer

Personal information
- Born: 15 September 1938 (age 88)
- Occupations: Garda; Solicitor

Sport
- Sport: Gaelic football
Club
- Years: Club
- 19??–?: St Eunan's
Club titles
- Donegal titles: 3
Inter-county
- Years: County
- 1957–19??: Donegal

Sean Ferriter (born 15 September 1938) is an Irish former Gaelic footballer who played for St Eunan's and the Donegal county team. His position was in midfield (though he did play as a goalkeeper for his school).

== Early life and education ==
Born in Milford, County Donegal, his parents were Garda Morgan (from West Kerry) and Tess (from Baltray in County Louth). He was one of six children: four sons and two daughters. He attended Dunfanaghy National School for his primary education. For his secondary education, Ferriter attended St Eunan's College as a boarder, playing for the school team (as a goalkeeper) and being greatly influenced by John Wilson, the Gaelic footballer and future Tánaiste who was teaching there at that time.

== Playing career ==
Ferriter played for the Donegal team that won the 1956 Ulster Minor Football Championship. He made his senior debut for Donegal in 1957 against Tyrone at the age of 18.

He captained the Donegal team that overcame Cavan in the 1963 Ulster Senior Football Championship semi-final, thus earning his team a place in the final for the first time.

He played for Donegal in the 1964–65 National Football League semi-final against Kerry.

He won three Donegal Senior Football Championships with his club St Eunan's. He also played for Ulster in the Railway Cup, with whom he won two titles.

== Retirement ==
A former Garda, Ferriter served for a time in Dublin. His experience of Dublin proved invaluable to Brian McEniff when Donegal qualified for the 1992 All-Ireland Senior Football Championship Final — against Dublin.

Ferriter later studied law and qualified as a solicitor, practising in the Dublin suburb of Blanchardstown.

He met his wife Mary, originally from Thurles, while she was working as a civil servant in Dublin (where Ferriter was at the time based as a Garda); she predeceased him. He has eight children. One of his sons, Paul, is a sculptor.

== Accolades ==
In 2001, the Donegal Democrat included Ferriter in a Millennium Team.

In May 2012, the Irish Independent named him in its selection of Donegal's "greatest team" spanning the previous 50 years.

In 2020, he was announced as the 44th inductee into the Donegal Sports Star Awards Hall of Fame Award.
