= Foundation Diploma in Art and Design =

Vocational qualification

The Foundation Diploma in Art and Design is a level 3/4 vocational qualification taken in England, Wales and Northern Ireland by young people aged 18 and over and by adults. The qualification is offered and awarded by Edexcel BTEC, UAL Awarding Body, WJEC Eduqas and Skills and Education Group Awards.

== Qualification overview ==
The Foundation Diploma in Art and Design is a vocational qualification mainly studied at level 3, but also available at level 4. At level 3 it is equivalent to 2 A Levels, at level 4 it is equivalent to 120 credits or the first year of degree study. The qualification serves as an intensive year long programme between sixth form and university, to prepare and equip students hoping to apply for art and design degrees with advanced artistic skills and broad knowledge in a range of art and design disciplines. On occasion, universities may allow entry into year 2 with the level 4 qualification, though this is ultimately at the discretion of each university.

The course is unique in that, despite being a further education course, it is predominantly offered by universities as well as FE colleges. The course is designed to function as an introduction to degree level art practice, with students spending the majority of time on the course in studio and practical, university style lectures and workshops. The course predominantly attracts those with A Level backgrounds, who likely had limited studio contact time or exposure during their singular Art A Level course, as opposed to students who come from a vocational art and design background and already had this significant exposure. Due to this, and a need for sufficient studio space to execute the course, many universities essentially use the qualification as a foundation year, such as UAL, Manchester Metropolitan University, Leeds Arts University and Arts University Bournemouth. As this course is free for UK residents aged 16-19 under DfE funding, it gives the course a unique advantage of being a fully funded introduction to these universities for younger students, as opposed to university-led foundation years and Access to HE courses.

The course is assessed in 7 units of 60 hours for which a pass must be achieved and 2 units of 90 hours which determine the overall grade, this totals 600 hours. Students are graded on their understanding of the unit by either a pass, merit or distinction (highest achievable). Students who wish to progress onto a BA in Fine Art and similar creative arts-based courses will usually need to attain a merit or above in order to meet the entry requirements.

== Grading ==
The Foundation Diploma is equivalent to 2 A Levels, and grades are awarded equivalent UCAS points.

Foundation Diploma Grading Scale
Grade	A Level Equivalent	UCAS Points
Distinction	A*A*	112
Merit	AA	96
Pass	BB	80

The usual entry requirements consist of an A Level in Art and Design or equivalent along with 5 GCSEs at grade 4/C including Maths and English. A portfolio of work is also required. Those with A Levels in other subjects can sometimes be accepted, provided their portfolio 'shows promise in art and design'.

== Progression ==
Possible outcomes include:

- progression to a BA degree in Fine Art and other Arts related subjects
- progression into employment or own freelance practice
