= Ulster Ladies' Senior Club Football Championship =

- Code: Ladies' Football
- Founded: 1977
- Title holders: St Ergnat's (1st title)
- Most titles: Donaghmoyne (14 titles)

The list of winners below is generated using the Roll of Honour from the Ulster LGFA website and other sources.

St Ergnat's of Moneyglass are the 2025 champions.

== Key ==
All-Ireland winners
All-Ireland finalists

== By year ==
Year	Venue	Winner	Score	County	Runner-up	Score	County
2025	Brewster Park	St Ergnat's, Moneyglass	3-10	Antrim	Errigal Ciaran	0-06	Tyrone
2024	Healy Park	Clann Éireann	2-17	Armagh	Lurgan	2-08	Cavan
2023	Healy Park	Clann Éireann	1-10	Armagh	Bredagh	0-08	Down
2022	Owenbeg	Donaghmoyne	1-11	Monaghan	Moneyglass	1-07	Antrim
2021	d: Carrickmore r: Crossmaglen	Donaghmoyne	2-10 (0-17)	Monaghan	Bredagh	1-06 (3-08)	Down
2020	Cancelled due to the impact of the COVID-19 pandemic on Gaelic games						
2019	Killyclogher	Donaghmoyne	1-11	Monaghan	Termon	1-09	Donegal
2018	Killyclogher	Donaghmoyne	1-15	Monaghan	Glenfin	1-08	Donegal
2017	Emyvale	St Macartans	3-04	Tyrone	Donaghmoyne	1-08	Monaghan
2016	Galbally	Donaghmoyne	2-12	Monaghan	St Macartans	1-06	Tyrone
2015	Killclogher	Donaghmoyne	0-14	Monaghan	Termon	0-07	Donegal
2014	Brewster Park	Termon	4-07	Donegal	Donaghmoyne	3-08	Monaghan
2013	d: Clones r: Trillick	Donaghmoyne	4-14 (1-14)	Monaghan	Termon	1-4 (4-5)	Donegal
2012	Augher	Donaghmoyne	1-12	Monaghan	Termon	2-6	Donegal
2011	Clones	Donaghmoyne	1-14	Monaghan	Termon	0-4	Donegal
2010	Beragh	Termon	3-06	Donegal	Donaghmoyne	0-13	Monaghan
2009	Truagh	Donaghmoyne	3-10	Monaghan	St Macartans	0-7	Tyrone
2008	d: Ballinascreen r: tbf	Donaghmoyne	1-14 (0-05)	Monaghan	Moville	1-09 (0-05)	Donegal
2007	Clones	Errigal Ciarán	2-05	Tyrone	Donaghmoyne	0-08	Monaghan
2006	Fintona	Donaghmoyne	1-14	Monaghan	Carrickmore	2-03	Tyrone
2005	Clones	Donaghmoyne	1-12	Monaghan	St Eunan's	0-05	Donegal
2004	Clones	Donaghmoyne	3-05	Monaghan	Carrickmore	0-08	Tyrone
2003	Scotstown	Cnoc Bríd	3-07	Cavan	Carrickmore	1-12	Tyrone
2002	Clones	Carrickmore	1-11	Tyrone	St Eunan's	0-06	Donegal
2001	Clones	Carrickmore	3-07	Tyrone	Monaghan Harps	3-08	Monaghan
2000	Clones	Monaghan Harps	1-12	Monaghan	Iveagh Boscos	1-11	Down
1999	Donagh	Aghabog	2-10	Monaghan	Carrickmore	2-07	Tyrone
1998	Celtic Park	St Eunan's	1-07	Donegal	St Macartans	1-05	Tyrone
1997 aet	Clones	St Eunan's	4-14	Donegal	Carrickmore	1-16	Tyrone
1996	Celtic Park	St Eunan's	2-10	Donegal	St Macartans	1-08	Tyrone
1995	Donagh	Aghabog	Monaghan	Aodh Ruadh		Donegal	
1994	Letterkenny	Inniskeen	2-05	Monaghan	St Eunan's	0-07	Donegal
1993	at eunans letterkenny	St Eunan's	10-10	Donegal	Galbally Celts	2-03	Tyrone
1992	Carrickmore	Carrickmore	3-05	Tyrone	St Eunan's	2-07	Donegal
1991	Aghabog			Monaghan	nominated to represent Ulster		
1984 - 1990 No Competition
1983	Mullahoran			Cavan	nominated to represent Ulster		
1982	Mullahoran			Cavan	nominated to represent Ulster		
1981	Mullahoran			Cavan	nominated to represent Ulster		
1980	Mullahoran			Cavan	nominated to represent Ulster		
1979	Mullahoran			Cavan	nominated to represent Ulster		
1978	tbc	Mullahoran	2-10	Cavan	Lissummon	2-00	Armagh
1977	tbc	Mullahoran	2-14	Cavan	Lissummon	0-06	Armagh

== By Club ==
Club	Winners	First	Last	Finalists	First	Last
Donaghmoyne (Monaghan)	14	2004	2022	4	2007	2017
Mullahoran (Cavan)	7	1977	1983	0	-	
St Eunan's (Donegal)	4	1993	1998	4	1992	2005
Carrickmore (Tyrone)	3	1992	2002	6	1993	2006
Clann Éireann (Armagh)	2	2023	2024	0	-	
Termon (Donegal)	2	2010	2014	5	2011	2019
Aghabog (Monaghan)	2	1995	1999	0	-	
St Macartans (Tyrone)	1	2017		4	1996	2016
St Ergnat's Moneyglass (Antrim)	1	2025		1	2022	
Errigal Ciarán (Tyrone)	1	2007		1	2025	
Monaghan Harps (Monaghan)	1	2000		1	2001	
Inniskeen (Monaghan)	1	1994		0	-	
Cnoc Bríd (Cavan)	1	2003		0	-	
Lissummon (Armagh)	0	-		2	1977	1978
Bredagh (Down)	0	-		2	2021	2023
Aodh Ruadh (Donegal)	0	-		1	1995	
Iveagh Boscos (Down)	0	-		1	2000	
Moville (Donegal)	0	-		1	2008	
Glenfin (Donegal)	0	-		1	2018	

== By County ==
County	Winners	Clubs	First	Last	Finalists	Clubs	First	Last
Monaghan	18	4	1994	2022	5	2	2001	2017
Cavan	8	2	1977	2003	1	1	2024	
Donegal	6	2	1993	2014	12	4	1992	2019
Tyrone	5	3	1992	2017	10	2	1993	2016
Armagh	2	1	2023	2024	2	1	1977	1978
Down	0	0	-		2	2	2000	2021

- Ulster not represented from 1984-1990
