= Joe Winston =

Irish Gaelic footballer (1944–2021)

Personal information
- Nickname: Dodo
- Born: 1944
- Died: 28 June 2021 (age 77) Letterkenny University Hospital
- Occupation: ESB employee

Sport
- Sport: Gaelic football
Club
- Years: Club
- ?–?: St Eunan's
Inter-county
- Years: County
- 1970s: Donegal
Inter-county titles
- Ulster titles: 2

Joe 'Dodo' Winston (1944 – 28 June 2021) was an Irish Gaelic footballer who played for St Eunan's and the Donegal county team.

== Playing career ==
Winston won his first ever medal with the St Eunan's under-16 team when he was 15 years of age in 1959. He would go on to win three Donegal Senior Football Championships with the club.

Winston won the Ulster Minor League with the Donegal minor football team in 1962.

A feature on many 1970s Donegal teams, He played in 1972 when Donegal won the Ulster Senior Football Championship for the first time and when they repeated the feat in 1974. He scored five points against Tyrone in the 1972 Ulster final.

He won his last ever medal while playing for St Eunan's in 1980, the Donegal Junior Football Championship.

== Post-playing career ==
Winston was an assistant (with Jimmy White) under the management of P. J. McGowan when Donegal won the 1987 All-Ireland Under 21 Football Championship.

He also coached and managed with the St Eunan's club. The club inducted him into its Hall of Fame in 2005.

== Personal life ==
Winston was originally from Letterkenny. He worked for the ESB. Married to Mary, they had sons Kevin and Darren and a daughter Elaine, who died in 2012. He lived at 3 Hawthorn Heights. He also played association football, hurling and cricket and would bet on horse racing.

Winston died on 28 June 2021, a Monday evening. He was 77 years of age and died at Letterkenny University Hospital after a brief illness. He had a wife, two sons, as well as three grandsons and a granddaughter. He had two brothers, Tom (Derry) and Brian (Ramelton). As well as his daughter, another brother Brendan predeceased him. Winston had socialised weekly during the ongoing pandemic before falling ill. His funeral was held at the Cathedral of St Eunan and St Columba on 1 July. He was buried with his daughter at Conwal Cemetery.

== Honours ==
St Eunan's

- Donegal Senior Football Championship (3): 19??, 19??, 19??
- Donegal Junior Football Championship: 1980

Donegal

- Ulster Senior Football Championship: 1972, 1974
