= Termon GAA =

Gaelic football club in County Donegal

- CLG An Tearmann
- Founded: 1963
- County: Donegal
- Colours: Maroon and white
- Grounds: The Burn Road, Termon
- Coordinates: 55°02′38″N 7°48′54″W

Playing kits
Standard colours

Senior Club Championships
	All Ireland	Ulster champions	Donegal champions
Ladies' football:	1	2	9

Termon Gaelic Athletic Association (Irish: Cumann Lúthchleas Gael An Tearmann), is a Gaelic football and ladies' Gaelic football club based in Termon, County Donegal, Ireland.

== History ==
Termon GAA was founded in 1963. They have won four Donegal IFC titles.

In 2003 and 2008, Termon reached the SFC final.

The ladies' team won the All-Ireland Ladies' Club Football Championship in 2014.

== Honours ==
=== Men ===
- Donegal Intermediate Football Championship (4): 1991, 2000, 2012, 2024
- Donegal Junior Football Championship (1): 1973
- All-County Football League Division 1 (1): 2025

=== Ladies ===
- All-Ireland Ladies' Club Football Championship (1): 2014
- Ulster Ladies' Senior Club Football Championship (2): 2010, 2014
- Donegal Senior Ladies' Football Championship (9): 2010, 2012, 2013, 2014, 2015, 2019, 2022, 2023, 2024
- Donegal Junior Ladies Football Championship (1): 2003

== Notable players ==
- Michael Boyle
- Johnny McCafferty
- Enda McCormick
- Kevin McMenamin
- Tommy Ryan
