= List of fellows of IEEE Power Electronics Society =

In the Institute of Electrical and Electronics Engineers, a small number of members are designated as fellows for having made significant accomplishments to the field. The IEEE Fellows are grouped by the institute according to their membership in the member societies of the institute. This list is of IEEE Fellows from the IEEE Power Electronics Society (IEEE-PELS).

Year	Fellow	Citation
2010	Shmuel (Sam) Ben-Yaakov	For the development of modeling and simulation methodologies for pulse width modulated and resonant converters
2010	Xiangning He	For leadership in establishing a power electronics research institute in China
2010	Johann Kolar	For contributions to three-phase pulse width modulation converter systems
2010	Seth Sanders	For contributions to integrated passive component technology and digital control of power electronics systems
2010	Fei (Fred) Wang	For contributions to design and control of high-power high density converters and drives
2010	Robert White	For contributions to digital power management in power systems for computing and telecommunications equipment
2011	Ivo Barbi	For contributions to soft switching converter technology
2011	Bo Cho	For contributions to large-scale distributed power electronics systems
2011	Fujio Kurokawa	For contributions to switching power converter control
2011	Zheng (John) Shen	For contributions to the development of lateral power metal-oxide semiconductor field-effect transistors
2011	Vatche Vorperian	For contributions to pulse width modulated and resonant converters
2012	Francis Kub	For leadership in the development of wide bandgap semiconductor power electronics
2012	Joel Spira	For leadership in developing and commercializing light control technologies
2012	Remus Teodorescu	For contributions to grid-connected renewable energy converter systems technology
2013	Ali Emadi	For contributions to electric power conversion and control for electric and hybrid vehicles
2013	Cian Mathuna	for leadership in the development of power supply using micromagnetics on silicon
2013	David Perreault	for contributions to design and application of very high frequency power electronic converters
2013	Dehong Xu	for contributions to power electronic applications to renewable energy systems
2013	Yan-Fei Liu	for contributions to digital control techniques of power electronics converters
2013	Donald Holmes	for contributions to the modulation and control of solid-state power electronic conversion equipment
2013	Leon Tolbert	for contributions to multilevel power electronic converter technology
2014	Cursino Jacobina	for contributions to the development of power converters and machine drives
2014	Pedro Rodriguez	for contributions to the control of distributed power generation
2014	Charles Sullivan	for contributions to the design of power electronic circuits and magnetics
2015	Dragan Masksimovic	for contributions to digital control of high-frequency switched-mode power converters
2015	Josef Drobnik	for development of high performance power converters in industrial applications
2015	Josep Guerrero	for contributions to distributed power systems and microgrids
2015	Paolo Mattavelli	for contributions to power converters for grid-connected applications and power management
2015	Khai Ngo	for contributions to unified synthesis and modeling of switched-mode converters
2015	Jian Sun	for contributions to modeling and control of power electronic circuits and systems
2015	Navid Zargari	for contribution to medium voltage drive technologies and applications
2016	Vassilios G. Agelidis	for contributions to power electronics, renewable energy conversion and integration with electricity grid
2016	Henry Chung	for contributions to power electronic converters for lighting
2016	Xinbo Ruan	for contributions to switching-mode power converter topologies and modulation strategies
2016	Tsorng-Juu Liang	for contributions to power conversion for lighting and sustainable energy
2016	Yungtaek Jang	for contributions to efficiency optimization of AC/DC power supplies
2017	Terry Ericsen	for leadership in power electronics
2017	Laszlo Huber	for contributions to AC/DC power converters for portable electronics equipment
2017	Toshihisa Shimizu	for development of reliable power converters for industrial and renewable energy applications
2017	Dianguo Xu	for contribution to control of electrical drives and power electronic converters
2017	Qing-chang Zhong	for contributions to power electronic systems control
2017	Faa-jeng Lin	Elevated by CIS for contributions to intelligent control systems for motor drives and motion control
2017	Josep Pou	for contributions to multilevel converters and renewable energy conversion
2017	Michael Gard	for contributions to instrumentation-and-measurement technology for petroleum exploration, computed tomography, and underground construction
2017	Bhuvaneswari Gurumoorthy	for contributions to design and development of enhanced power quality converters
2017	Lennart Harnefors	for contributions to control and dynamic analysis of power electronic systems
2017	Juri Jatskevich	for contributions to modeling of electric machines and switching converters
2017	Edson Watanabe	for contributions to the application of power electronics for power conditioning
2018	Leo Casey	for contributions to high-speed power electronic interfaced for grid-tied distributed resources
2018	Noriko Kawakami	for contributions to large-capacity power converters and applications
2018	Hui Li	for contributions to bidirectional converters for utility applications and high efficiency photovoltaic converters
2018	Shengyi Liu	for application of multifunctional power conversion and power source integration to aircraft
2018	Guo-Quan Lu	for developmewnt of materials and packaging technologies for power electronics modules
2018	Udaya Madawala	for contributions to power electronics for bi-directional wireless power transfer
2018	Hans Peter Nee	for contributions to silicon carbide power electronics and modular multilevel converters
2018	Zhengming Zhao	for contributions to electromagnetic transient analysis and control of high-voltage high-power electronics conversion
2019	Patrick Chapman	for application of power electronics devices and systems for solar power conversion
2019	Zhe Chen	for contributions to power electronics for wind energy conversion
2019	Sewan Choi	for contributions to power converter technologies
2019	Jose Cobos	for contributions to power supply systems
2019	Timothy Green	for contributions to power electronics for power systems control
2019	Jinjun Liu	for contributions to modeling and control of power systems
2019	David Torrey	for contributions to modeling, design and control of electric machines and drives
2019	Shuo Wang	for contributions to reduction of electromagnetic interference in electronic systems
2019	Richard Zhang	for leadership in development of power electronic converters
2020	Mohamed Benbouzid	For contributions to diagnosis and fault-tolerant control of electric machines and drives
2020	Jiann-fuh Chen	for contributions to power electronics in sustainable energy and high power systems
2020	Kawai Cheng	for contribution to electric vehicle technology and switched capacitor power conversion
2020	Keith Corzine	for contributions to topology and control of multilevel converters
2020	Venkata Dinavahi	for contributions to real-time simulation of power systems with embedded power electronic converters
2020	Gerard Ledwich	for development of control of power systems and power electronics
2020	Kevin Lee	for contributions to power quality for adjustable speed drives
2020	Bradley Lehman	for contributions to high quality LED lighting and modeling and control of DC-DC converters
2020	Shihua Li	for contributions to the theory of mismatched disturbance rejection in industrial systems
2020	Yun Wei Li	for contributions to power electronics converters in microgrids and industrial drives
2020	Burak Ozpineci	for contributions to transportation electrification and wireless charging of electric vehicles
2020	Chuntaek Rim	for contributions to wireless power transfer for electric vehicles and mobile devices
2020	Wei Qiao	for contributions to condition monitoring and control of power electronics interfaced rotating machine systems
2020	Mahinda Vilathgamuwa	for contributions to power quality and grid storage
2020	Sheldon Williamson	for contributions to electric energy storage systems for transportation electrification
2020	Xiao-ping Zhang	for contributions to modeling and control of high-voltage DC and AC transmission systems
2023	Michael Negnevitsky	for contributions to application of AI techniques for control of isolated hybrid power systems
2024	Siew Chong Tan	for contribution to the control of power converters and sustainable lighting technologies
2026	Maeve Duffy	for contributions to advances in the modelling of planar magnetics and wireless power

== See also ==
- List of IEEE Fellows
