= Pettigo =

Village in County Donegal, Ireland and County Fermanagh, Northern Ireland

Pettigo Paiteagó
- Village
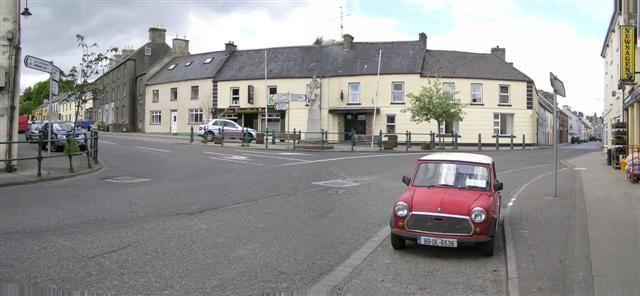
- Village centre

- Location in Ireland
- Coordinates: 54°32′56″N 7°49′52″W
- Jurisdictions: Republic of Ireland and Northern Ireland
- Province: Ulster
- County: County Donegal; County Fermanagh

Population (2022)
  - Urban: 557
- Time zone: UTC+0 (WET)
  - Summer (DST): UTC-1 (IST (WEST))
- Irish Grid Reference: H105669

Pettigo, also spelt Pettigoe (/ˈpɛtɪɡoʊ/ PET-ig-oh; Irish: Paiteagó [ˈpˠatʲəɡoː]), is a small village and townland on the border of County Donegal, Republic of Ireland, and County Fermanagh, Northern Ireland. It is bisected by the Termon River, which is part of the border between the Republic of Ireland and Northern Ireland.

The portion of the village in County Fermanagh is officially called Tullyhommon but is locally known as 'High Street' because of its hillside position overlooking the remainder of the village. The rest of the village in the Republic includes Main Street, Mill Street and Station Street, all of which meet in The Diamond at the centre of the village. There are also two relatively modern housing estates on the northern outskirts, Termon Villas and St. Patrick's Terrace, along with new developments such as Mill Grove.

Until the late 1700s, the area was known as An Tearmann, meaning 'a place of sanctuary'. The modern Irish (Paiteagó) and English (Pettigo) names derive from the Latin protectio (protection), a translation of the Irish An Tearmann.

== Population ==
For the purpose of data collection, the Census of Ireland regards the Pettigo area as three separate electoral divisions, Pettigo (396), Grousehall (76) and Templecarn (128), with a total population of 600 in 2011. The portion of the village in County Fermanagh was recorded as having a population of 63, in the 2011 census.

The population of the village has decreased in recent years. The preliminary results from the 2016 census gave the three electoral divisions a total population of 590 and the results of the 2022 census gave the three Electoral Divisions a total population of 557. The 2021 census for the portion of the village in Co. Fermanagh gave a population of 76.

== Economy ==
Once a thriving market village on the Enniskillen and Bundoran Railway, the village suffered from partition in 1922, the closure of the railway in 1957 and from the closure of numerous cross-border roads by the British Army at the height of the Troubles in Northern Ireland. The latter cut Pettigo off from much of its rural hinterland in counties Fermanagh and Tyrone. In recent years, economic prospects have improved with the reopening of many of the cross-border roads, improving access for tourists and locals alike.

Agriculture, particularly the rearing of sheep and cattle, forms the mainstay of the local economy. The quality of the local land (marshy, with much blanket bog) renders it largely unsuitable for grain crops. There are also expansive forestry plantations in the surrounding townlands, owned and operated by Coillte Teoranta, the Republic's Forestry Service. Many of the plantations occupy land unsuitable for other commercial uses or where peat extraction has been completed, leaving poor quality thin soil cover behind. The Sitka spruce and lodgepole pine softwood varieties comprise 90% of the canopy.

Pettigo has traditionally been the gateway to St. Patrick's Purgatory, a Christian pilgrimage site, situated on an island in Lough Derg. During the mid-late 20th century, the popularity of the pilgrimage brought a significant boost to the local economy as tens of thousands of pilgrims from all over Ireland and abroad travelled through the village on their way to and from Lough Derg. Although the popularity of the pilgrimage has dwindled in recent years, it is still an important driver of tourism in the area.

== History ==
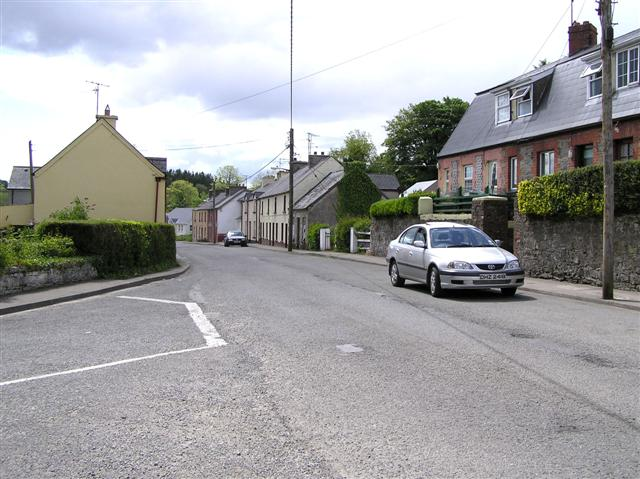
The R233 road connects Pettigo with Lough Derg

In June 1922, during the Northern IRA offensive, Pettigo in what became the new Irish Free State, and Belleek, which was now in Northern Ireland were occupied by a 100-strong Irish Republican Army unit who had arrived there from Donegal. They were attacked first by a party of 100 Ulster Special Constabulary, who crossed Lough Erne, but they were beaten off, losing one killed. Two companies of British Army troops, along with 6 field guns, along with the USC, were then sent to take the villages. In the ensuing fighting, in which the British bombarded the village and then stormed it, the IRA lost three men killed, six wounded and four captured before being forced to retreat back to Donegal. One British soldier was killed in the fighting. Two civilians were also shot dead by the USC in nearby Lettercan. Other reports put the IRA casualties at seven killed and the total death toll as high as 30. A memorial was erected in 1953 to commemorate the four men who died in the invasion of Pettigo on 4 June 1922.

Owing to its numerous Protestant inhabitants and awkward position astride the border, Pettigo would have been transferred to Northern Ireland had the recommendations of the Irish Boundary Commission been enacted in 1925.

== Religion ==
The local area has a mixed religious composition, with the village having Roman Catholic, Church of Ireland, Presbyterian and Methodist Churches. It is the site of one of two basilicas in Ireland, St Patrick's Purgatory.

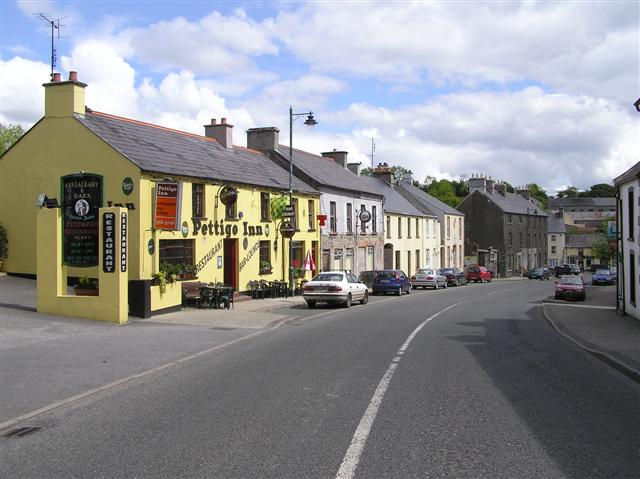
The village is also on the R232 road

== Public transport ==
=== Bus services ===
Ulsterbus route 194 provides several daily journeys to and from Enniskillen via Irvinestown whereas route 195 provides one journey each way to Bundoran via Castlecaldwell and Belleek. Pettigo is not served by Ulsterbus on Sundays, though is served by McGeehan Coaches-Bus Éireann Expressway route 30, providing one journey in each direction to/from Dublin via Enniskillen, Cavan and Dublin Airport. Bus Éireann seasonal route 486 provides links to and from Ballyshannon and Enniskillen for pilgrims to and from Station Island but also serves Pettigo.

=== Railway ===
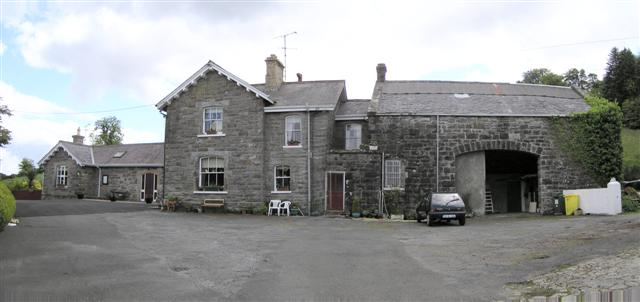
Pettigo railway station

Pettigo railway station once served the village, the Enniskillen and Bundoran Railway opened from Bundoran Junction on the Londonderry and Enniskillen Railway near Kilskeery, County Tyrone to Pettigo on 13 June 1866. It was extended to Bundoran, County Donegal in 1868 and intended to continue to Sligo but failed to do so. The Great Northern Railway ran the E&BR from 1876 and took it over in 1896.

The railway greatly aided the movement and export of agricultural produce such as sheep and cattle and the import and distribution of coal, building materials and imported food. Livestock were loaded onto the train from the nearby Pettigo Market Yard.

Both the partition of Ireland in 1922 and increasing road transport weakened the railway. The Government of Northern Ireland made the GNR close nearly all of its cross-border lines, including the Bundoran branch, on 1 October 1957.

== Notable people ==
- General Charles Barton (1760–1819) lived at his Pettigo estate known as the Waterfoot
- Sir Sidney Barton (1876-1946), British Minister to Ethiopia
- Moya Doherty (born 1957), co-founder of Riverdance
- John Kells Ingram (1823-1907), poet
- Sir John Leslie, 4th Baronet, 4th baronet (1916-2016), Glaslough and Pettigo
- The Most Rev. Miler Magrath (c.1523-1622), Church of Ireland Archbishop of Cashel
- Seán McGinley (born 1956), actor
- Basil McIvor (1928-2004), politician and pioneer of integrated education

== Termon McGrath Castle ==
Termon McGrath Castle, also known as Castle McGrath, was probably built in the early seventeenth century, probably being built circa 1611, at the start of the Plantation of Ulster. The 'castle' (in reality a Gaelic towerhouse) was built for either The Most Rev. Miler McGrath, Church of Ireland Archbishop of Cashel, or, more likely, his son, James McGrath. During the campaign of 1649-1650, the castle was bombarded by Cromwellian troops, which severely damaged the structure; it seems that the castle was abandoned around this time. A small village, no longer in existence, seems to have grown up immediately outside the castle walls. There was an escape tunnel from the castle to the Belaut River. The castle and lands were sold to the Leslie family of County Monaghan, who controlled the Pettigo estate until the early 20th century.

== The Mill ==
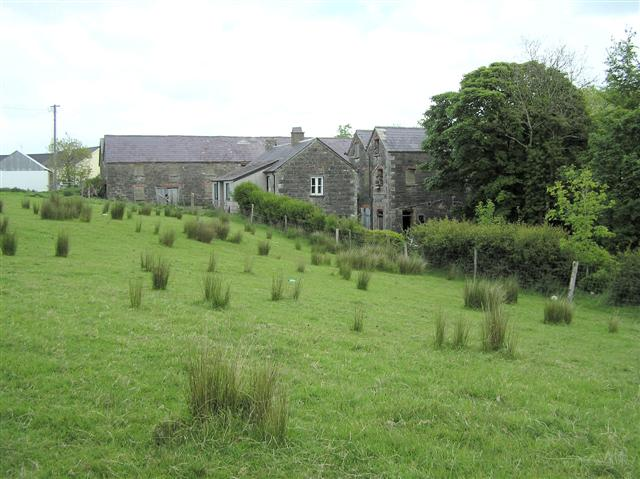
Pettigo Mill

Pettigo Mill was built by the Leslie family, who owned the Pettigo estate. The Leslie family were originally from Monaghan town. Pettigo Mill was first on the map of Pettigo dated 1767 but is probably much older. The Mill got its power from the Termon river. It was described as a cloth mill, i.e. woolen cloth, but probably also ground oats and other grains. During the famine, maize or Indian meal, as it was called, was ground in the Pettigo Mill. This was then sent to the poor through the port of Ballyshannon in the year 1845–1846. After the arrival of the railway in Pettigo, which opened in 1860, Pettigo Mill was a saw mill as well as a grain mill. Timber for all the usual purposes was produced but the main product that was made was egg boxes, which held twelve eggs. Eggs were sent by train to the cities of Belfast and Dublin or on to England and Scotland. Egg boxes were in great demand as many people depended on their egg money to buy their groceries in the local shops.

== The Termon Complex ==
The Termon Complex is a community initiative by ADoPT (Association for Development of Pettigo and Tullyhommon). It is a sports, leisure and entertainment complex located on the banks of the River Termon, opened in May 2014. The building project was a collaboration between the Planning & Economic Development Directorate of Donegal County Council, in partnership with Fermanagh District Council and the Association for the Development of Pettigo and Tullyhommon (ADoPT). The Termon Project has been awarded €8.3 million of EU support through the PEACE III Programme. The complex encompasses:

- Different spaces within the building which facilitate indoor sports, large meetings/conferences, drama productions and concerts—including a main hall, conference room and meeting rooms.
- ADoPT offices
- A purpose-built gym
- An outdoor multi-use games area (MUGA)
- A new playschool with a secure private playground
- A new public playground and community garden
- Recycling space, car parking and horticultural tunnels

== Walks ==
The mountains, hills and quiet country roads offer space for hill-walking, cycling and pony trekking. The Pettigo History trail, which is centred round the village, can be explored at the hiker's leisure. The trail entails the history and heritage of the Pettigo area. 30 plaques tell of the creator of Riverdance, Moya Doherty, "French" Tom Barton, "Banjo" Patterson, the Crimean War Tree and the Pettigo Connection to "The Quiet Man", among many other tales of the areas surrounded by lakes.

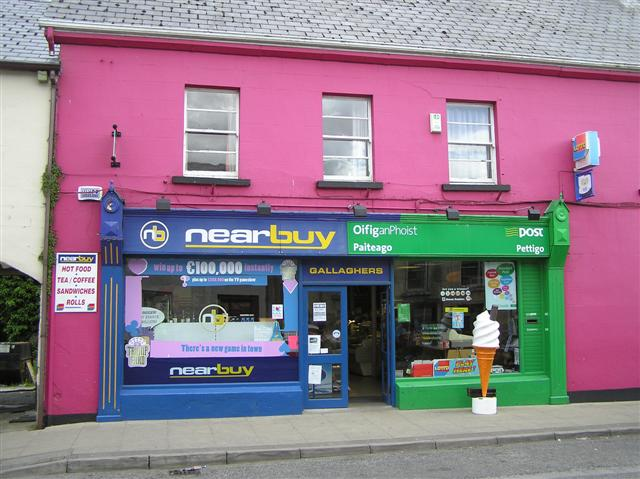
Pettigo Post Office

== Lakes/angling ==
Lying between Lough Erne and Lough Derg, Pettigo is able to offer the visiting angler a full range of fishing opportunities. With over fifty lakes, salmon and native brown trout will keep the game angler happy, while the coarse angler will find specimen fish in Drumgun Lough. Fishing permits and boat hire are available from Brittons Bar, which is located in the village.

== Lough Derg ==
Lough Derg, the biggest of the Pettigo lakes covers 2,200 acres with a shore line of 13 miles. Station Island, the location of the Lough Derg Pilgrimage, is often referred to as Saint Patrick's Purgatory or simply Lough Derg. This small lake-island, renowned in Irish Christian tradition since the time of St. Patrick, has been receiving pilgrims continuously for well over 1000 years.

In earlier times, the area around the lake was a place of protection for anyone in trouble. The monastery nearby offered hospitality to all.

== See also ==
- List of towns and villages in the Republic of Ireland

== General sources ==
- Baker, Michael H.C. (1972). Irish Railways since 1916. London: Ian Allan. ISBN 0-7110-0282-7.
- Hajducki, S. Maxwell (1974). A Railway Atlas of Ireland. Newton Abbott: David & Charles. maps 6, 7, page xiii. ISBN 0-7153-5167-2.
- Sprinks, N. W. (1970). Sligo, Leitrim and Northern Counties Railway. Billericay: Irish Railway Record Society (London Area).
