= Kilskeery =

Village in County Tyrone, Northern Ireland

Coordinates: 54°26′N 7°32′W

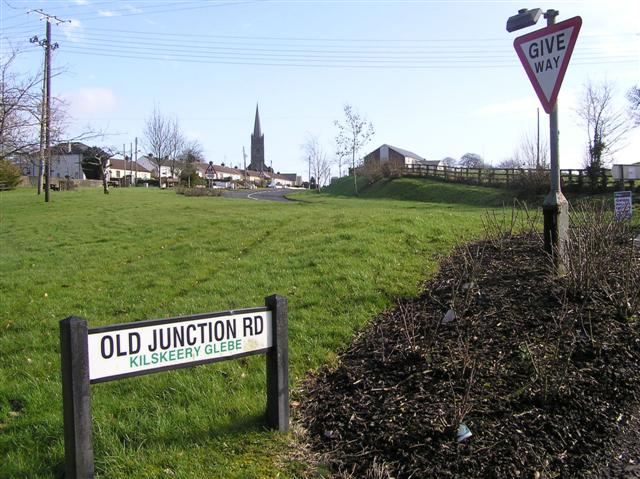
Old Junction Road, Kilskeery

Kilskeery (from Irish Cill Scíre) is a small village and civil parish in County Tyrone, Northern Ireland. It is between Ballinamallard and Trillick. In the 2021 census, it had a population of 55 people. Kilskeery is within the Omagh District Council area.

The Ballinamallard River flows through the village towards Lough Erne. The village has two graveyards within its boundaries. The "old" graveyard surrounded by stone walls has graves from the 19th century.

== Layout ==
On the northern end of the village is the local Church of Ireland church. At over 400 years old, it was reputedly used as an overnight refuge by the forces of King William of Orange. A few years ago, uplighting was added around the church. The church has a tower and bell which is rung on Sunday mornings. The church is surrounded by what is locally known as the 'new' graveyard. Behind the church is the Sunday school rooms.

Behind the church grounds is the local primary school, the Queen Elizabeth II. It has two classrooms and a dining hall, outside is the playing field and a school garden.

A row of houses, leading southwards from the church, is called Beatty Terrace. Opposite Beatty Terrace is the church hall. Built on the same site as an earlier hall, the new church hall is a larger and better-equipped building with a kitchen and an upstairs meeting room. At the end of Beatty Terrace is the village green. Just behind the village green is the 'old' graveyard.

The village extends out the Irvinestown road and at the cross can be found the post office.

In 2008, the speed limit within the village was changed to 30 mph.

== Railway development ==
Kilskeery is near Bundoran Junction railway station which was the junction of the Enniskillen and Bundoran Railway and the Londonderry and Enniskillen Railway. The Enniskillen and Bundoran Railway opened from Bundoran Junction on the Londonderry and Enniskillen Railway near Kilskeery to Pettigo on 13 June 1866. It was extended to Bundoran, County Donegal in 1868 and intended to continue to Sligo but failed to do so. The Great Northern Railway ran the E&BR from 1876 and took it over in 1896.

== Schools ==
Local schools include Queen Elizabeth II Primary School and the Free Presbyterian School.

== See also ==
- List of civil parishes of County Tyrone
