= Tullyhommon =

Coordinates: 54.553549°N 7.817717°W

Tullyhommon or Tullyhomman (from Irish Tulaigh Uí Thiomáin, meaning 'Ó Tiomáin's hillock') is a townland in County Fermanagh, which forms part of the village of Pettigo. The village of Pettigo is primarily within County Donegal in the Republic of Ireland, however one street, High Street, is on the Fermanagh side. Pettigo is divided by the River Termon, which forms part of the boundary between Northern Ireland and the Republic of Ireland. In the 2011 census, Tullyhommon townland had a population of 63 people. The combined population of the whole village, including the portions in County Donegal and County Fermanagh is approximately 450.

== History ==
On 4 June 1922, Pettigo village was occupied by members of the Irish Republican Army (IRA), part of Michael Collins campaign against Northern Ireland, during the Battle of Pettigo and Belleek. The village of Belleek, 12 miles (19 km) from Tullyhomon, became part of the new Northern Ireland and Pettigo was retained by the Irish Free State. Soldiers from the British Army crossed Lough Erne in order to fight the IRA and the estimated casualties were three IRA men killed, six wounded and four captured, the British lost one soldier while two civilians who were killed in the fighting. There is a memorial on the Belleek Road to those who "died fighting against British forces in Pettigo 4-6-1922", while a mere few metres from it is a memorial to those "who gave their lives in the Great War 1914–1918".

=== The Troubles ===
On 30 August 1973, British Army non commissioned officer S/Sgt Ronald Beckett (aged 36) was killed while trying to defuse a bomb planted by the Provisional IRA at Tullyhommon Post Office.

On 8 November 1987, a Provisional IRA bomb exploded at a Remembrance Sunday ceremony in nearby Enniskillen, killing 11 people and injuring 63. A few hours after the blast, the IRA called a radio station and said it had abandoned a 150-pound (68 kg) bomb in Tullyhommon after it failed to detonate. That morning, a Remembrance Sunday parade (which included many members of the Boys' and Girls' Brigades) had unwittingly gathered near the bomb, which was larger and had the capacity to inflict more casualties than those at Enniskillen. British soldiers and RUC officers had also been there, and the IRA said it triggered the bomb when soldiers were standing beside it. It was defused by security forces and was found to have a command wire leading to a "firing point" across the border.

== People ==
- Basil McIvor (17 June 1928 – 5 November 2004), Ulster Unionist politician and pioneer of integrated education, was born in Tullyhommon.
