= Kesh railway station =

Railway station in Northern Ireland

Kesh

General information
- Location: Kesh, County Fermanagh, Northern Ireland; UK
- Coordinates: 54.522988°N 7.719556°W

History
- Original company: Enniskillen and Bundoran Railway
- Post-grouping: Great Northern Railway (Ireland)

Key dates
- 13 June 1866: Station opens
- 1 October 1957: Station closes
Location

Kesh railway station served Kesh in County Fermanagh in Northern Ireland.

The Enniskillen and Bundoran Railway opened the station on 13 June 1866. Services were provided by the Irish North Western Railway.

It was taken over by the Great Northern Railway (Ireland) in 1876.

It closed on 1 October 1957.

== Routes ==
Preceding station	Disused railways	Following station
Irvinestown	Enniskillen and Bundoran Railway; Enniskillen to Bundoran	Pettigo
