= Ballyshannon railway station =

Former railway station in Ireland

Ballyshannon
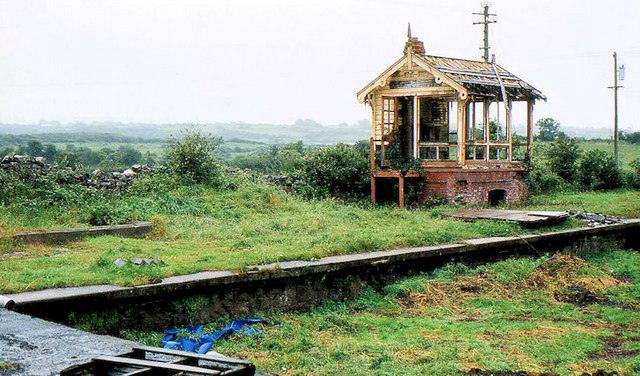
- Remains of Ballyshannon railway station on 25 July 1981.

General information
- Location: Ballyshannon, County Donegal; Ireland
- Coordinates: 54.498639°N 8.18719°W

History
- Opened: 13 June 1866
- Closed: 1 October 1957
- Original company: Enniskillen and Bundoran Railway
- Post-grouping: Great Northern Railway (Ireland)

Services
Preceding station	Enniskillen and Bundoran Railway	Following station
Belleek	Enniskillen to Bundoran	Bundoran
Location

Ballyshannon railway station served Ballyshannon in County Donegal in the Republic of Ireland.

The Enniskillen and Bundoran Railway opened the station on 13 June 1866. Services were provided by the Irish North Western Railway.

The Great Northern Railway (Ireland) took it over in 1876.

The Ulster Transport Authority closed it on 1 October 1957.

It is included in the National Inventory of Architectural Heritage.

== Attractions in Ballyshannon ==
The passengers alighting at Ballyshannon would have seen the delights of the River Erne, including the Assaroe Falls, which was altered by hydroelectric construction.

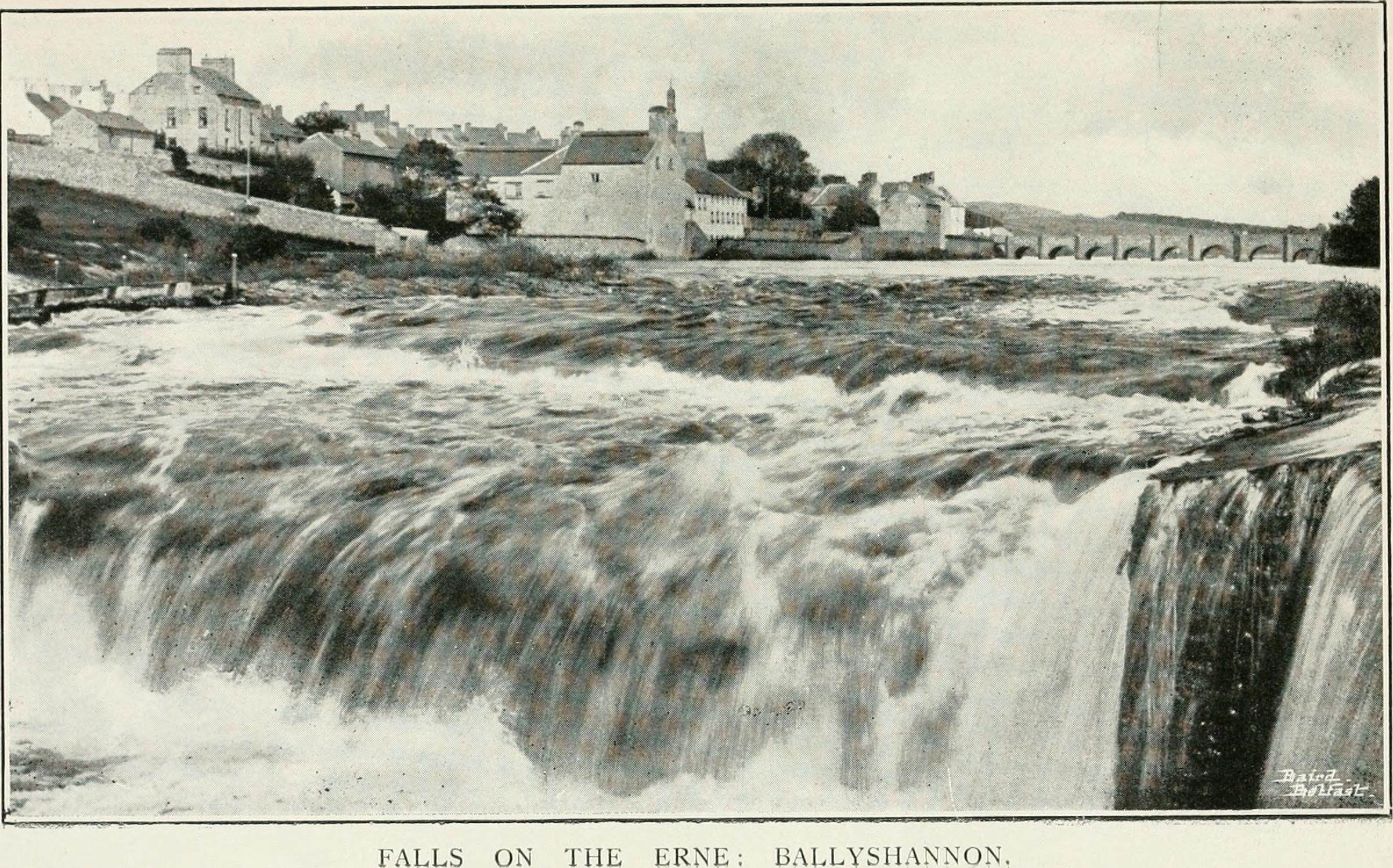
Picturesque Donegal- its mountains, rivers, and lakes. Being the Great Northern Railway (Ireland) Company's illustrated guide to the sporting and touring grounds of the north of Ireland (1908) (14777237441)
