= Shmuel (Sam) Ben-Yaakov =

Israeli engineer, inventor, and academic (born 1939)

- שמואל (סם) בן-יעקב
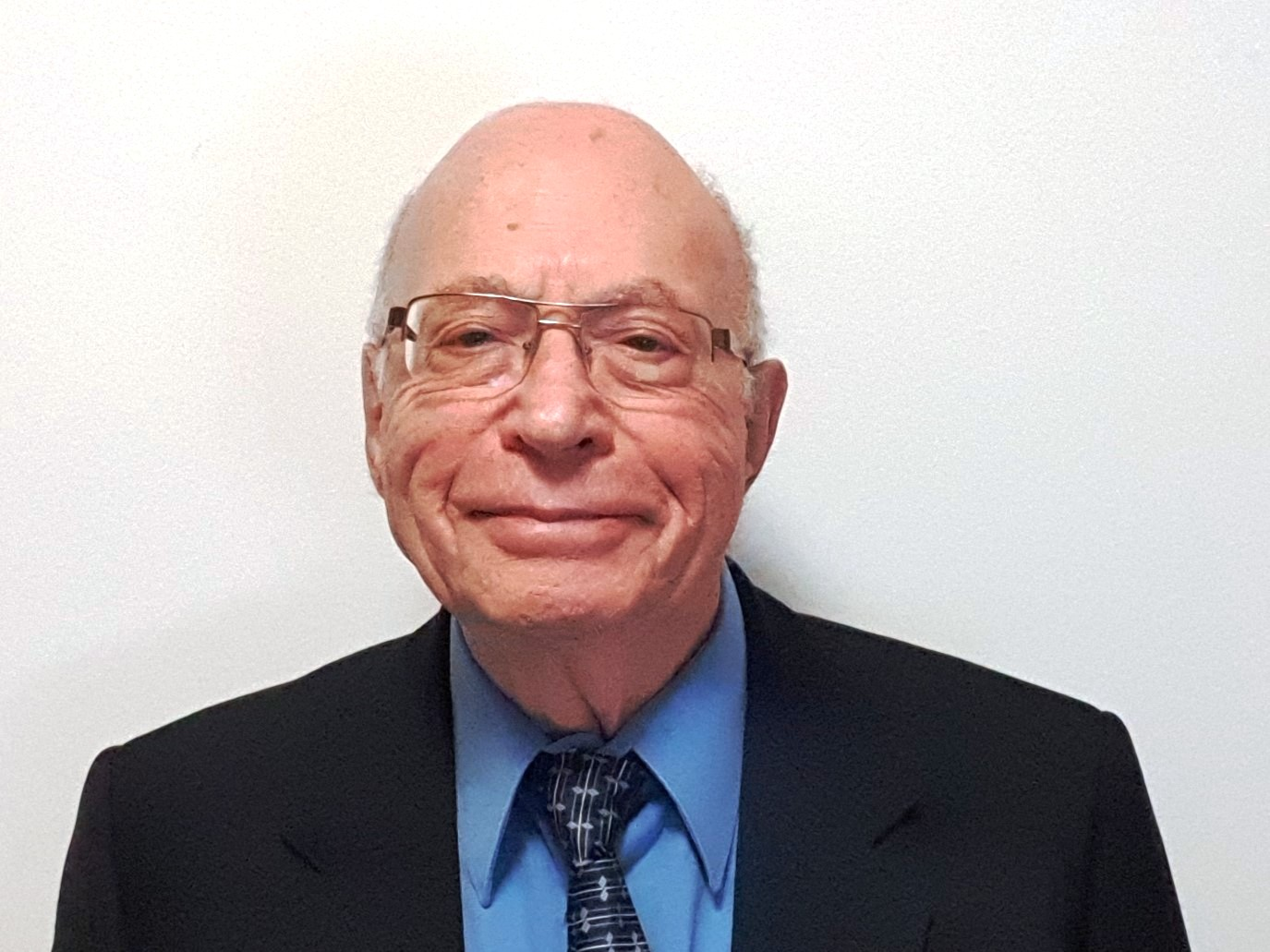
- Born: January 20, 1939 (age 87); Israel
- Citizenship: Israeli
- Education: Technion – Israel Institute of Technology; University of California, Los Angeles
- Scientific career
- Fields: Chemical Oceanography; Power Electronics; Engineering Education
- Workplaces: Ben-Gurion University of the Negev

Shmuel (Sam) Ben-Yaakov (in Hebrew: שמואל בן-יעקב; born January 20, 1939) is an Israeli engineer, inventor, and academic known for his contributions to medical instrumentation, chemical oceanography, power electronics, and engineering education. He is Professor Emeritus of Electrical and Computer Engineering at Ben-Gurion University of the Negev (BGU), and the founder of Green Power Technologies Ltd. Ben-Yaakov is also the Chief innovation officer at IRP Systems Ltd., and the creator of the educational YouTube channel "Sam Ben-Yaakov," dedicated to power electronics and circuit theory.

== Education ==
Ben-Yaakov received his early training in electrical engineering, obtaining a BSc degree from the Technion, Israel, in 1964. He then worked for several years at the medical laboratory of the Hadassah Medical Center, Jerusalem, where he developed, with others, medical instrumentation. He continued his academic studies at the University of California, Los Angeles (UCLA), earning MS and PhD degrees in electrical engineering in 1967 and 1970, respectively.

== Research in chemical oceanograph ==
In his early scientific career, Ben-Yaakov conducted research in chemical oceanography, focusing on the measurement and modeling of carbonate equilibria; He co-developed a high-pressure pH sensor capable of operation at pressures corresponding to depths of about 4 km. This instrument performs in situ pH sensing in the deep ocean and formed the technical basis for the carbonate saturometer, which he later developed and used for oceanographic investigations to depths of about 4 km. By equilibrating seawater with solid carbonate minerals and monitoring pH changes, the device enabled quantitative assessment of calcium carbonate saturation states, contributing to the early understanding of oceanic carbonate equilibria and research on ocean acidification and the global carbon cycle.

After returning to Israel in 1974, Ben-Yaakov studied various chemical aspects of the Dead Sea.

== Power electronics and energy conversion ==
After joining Ben-Gurion University of the Negev in 1974, Ben-Yaakov's research turned to power electronics, where he contributed to switch-mode power conversion. He performed experimental and analytical work on: small-signal modeling, control of power systems, magnetics, PWM converters, resonant converters and switched-capacitor converters.

His research group developed several techniques for behavioral modeling and simulation of PWM and resonant converters, as well as magnetic components. The latter led to the development of a high-frequency controlled inductor. Ben-Yaakov also contributed to modeling and simulation of nonlinear capacitors and switched-capacitor converters, which led to the development of novel, high-resolution converter architectures.

Ben-Yaakov became a full professor at BGU in 1984 and held the Chair in Instrumentation Design from 1988 until his retirement.

Ben-Yaakov is a Life Fellow of the IEEE, recognized for "the development of modeling and simulation methodologies for pulse width modulated and resonant converters.”

== Patents and industry contributions ==
Ben-Yaakov is the inventor or co-inventor of patents related to energy conversion and control. He founded Green Power Technologies Ltd., focusing on the development of active power factor correction controllers that require no sensing of input voltage, based on patents developed by him and his collaborators. He later served as Chief Innovation Officer at IRP Systems Ltd., contributing to innovations in electric vehicle powertrains and motor control technologies.

== Educational activities ==
In his university teachings and mentoring of graduate students, Ben-Yaakov emphasized intuitive explanation as a vital tool in engineering education. The intuitive explanation approach is the motto of the YouTube channel "Sam Ben-Yaakov", which he established, posting lectures and demonstrations on power electronics, circuit theory, and magnetic components. As of October 2025, the channel included more than 500 videos, had more than 47 thousand subscribers, and had about 50 thousand views per month.
