= Belleek railway station =

Railway station in Northern Ireland

Coordinates: 54.48°N 8.09°W

Belleek
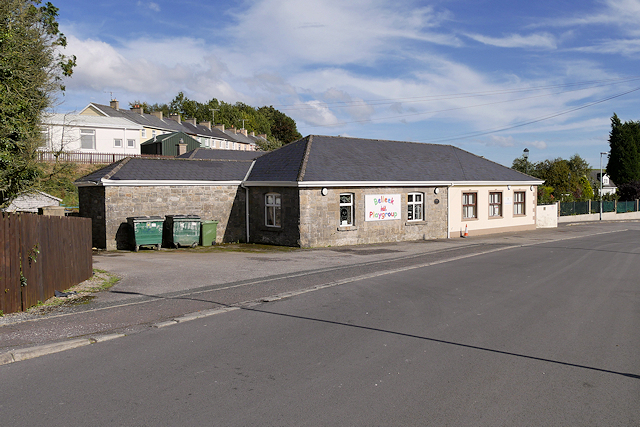
- The former station building, which is now the Belleek Playgroup

General information
- Location: Marina Road; Belleek, County Fermanagh, Northern Ireland; UK

History
- Original company: Enniskillen and Bundoran Railway
- Post-grouping: Great Northern Railway (Ireland)

Key dates
- 13 June 1866: Station opens
- 1 October 1957: Station closes
Location

Belleek railway station served Belleek in County Fermanagh in Northern Ireland.

== History ==
The Enniskillen and Bundoran Railway opened the station on 13 June 1866. Services were provided by the Irish North Western Railway.

It was taken over by the Great Northern Railway (Ireland) in 1876.

It closed on 1 October 1957. The building is currently used by a children's playgroup.

== Routes ==
Preceding station	Disused railways	Following station
Castlecaldwell	Enniskillen and Bundoran Railway; Enniskillen to Bundoran	Ballyshannon
