= Bundoran railway station =

Station in County Donegal, Ireland

Bundoran Bun Dobhráin
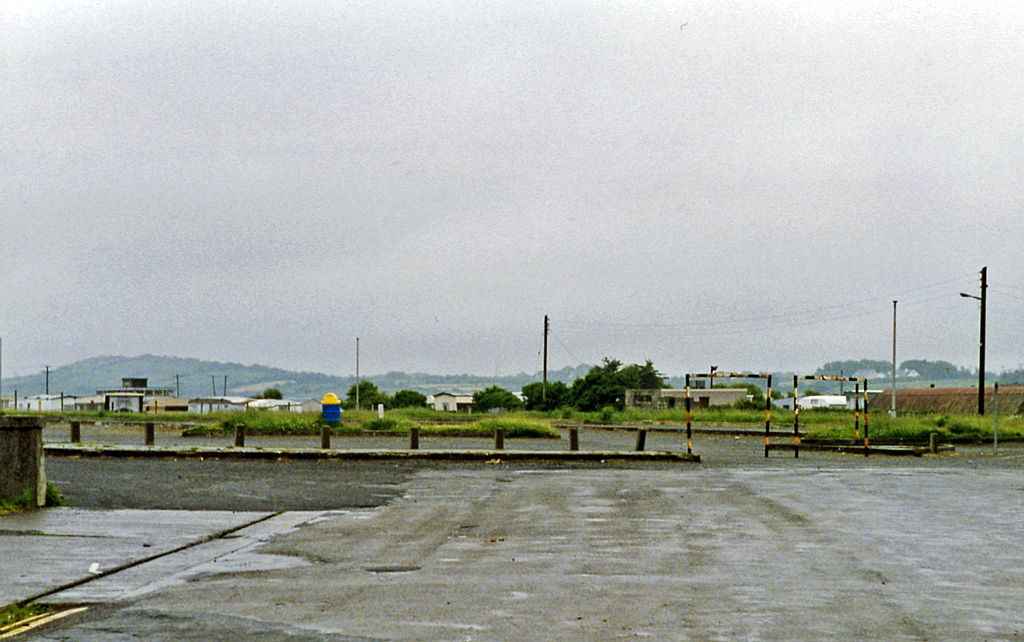
- Site of Bundoran Station

General information
- Other names: Bun Dobhráin
- Location: Station Road, Bundoran; County Donegal; Ireland
- Coordinates: 54.473602°N 8.298249°W

History
- Original company: Enniskillen and Bundoran Railway
- Post-grouping: Great Northern Railway (Ireland)

Key dates
- 13 June 1866: Station opened
- 1 October 1957: Station closed
Location

Bundoran railway station served Bundoran in County Donegal in the Republic of Ireland.

== History ==
The Enniskillen and Bundoran Railway opened the station on 13 June 1866. Services were provided by the Irish North Western Railway. It was taken over by the Great Northern Railway (Ireland) in 1876.

The partition of Ireland in 1922 turned the boundary with County Fermanagh into an international frontier. Henceforth Bundoran's only railway link with the rest of the Irish Free State was via Northern Ireland, and as such was subject to delays for customs inspections.

During The Emergency of 1939–45 the GNR introduced the Bundoran Express that linked Dublin and Bundoran via Dundalk and Clones. It also carried pilgrims to and from Pettigo, which was the nearest station for Lough Derg. There were also through trains between Bundoran and Belfast. The Government of Northern Ireland closed much of the GNR network on its side of the border in 1957, including the E&BR as far as the border. This gave the Republic no practical alternative but to allow the closure of the line between the border and Bundoran. It officially closed on 1 October 1957.

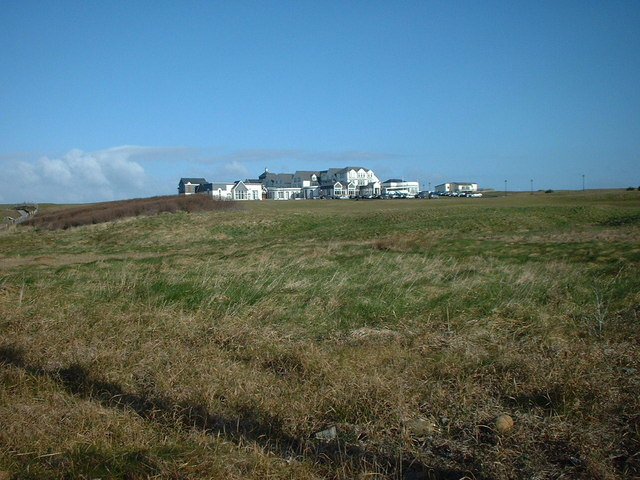
The Great Northern Hotel in Bundoran.

== Routes ==
| Preceding station | Disused railways | Following station |
|---|---|---|
| Ballyshannon | Enniskillen and Bundoran Railway; Enniskillen to Bundoran | Terminus |
