= Cathaleen's Fall Hydroelectric Power Station =

Dam in County Donegal, Ireland

Cathaleen's Fall
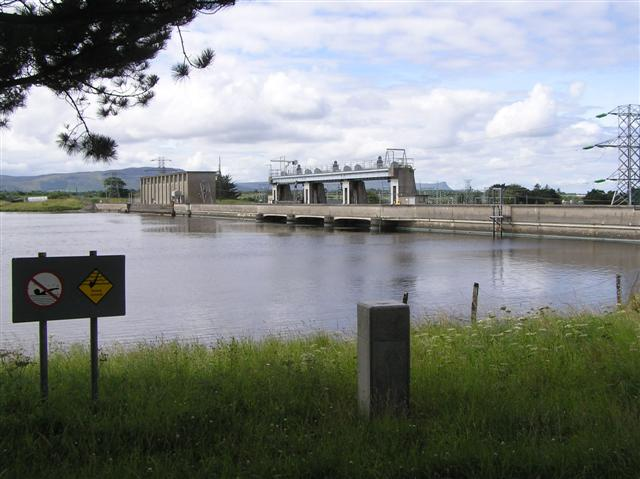

- Location within Ireland
- Coordinates: 54°29′58.21″N 8°10′26.68″W
- Status: Operational
- Construction began: 1946
- Opening date: 1 October 1952
- Owner: ESB Group

Dam and spillways
- Type of dam: Gravity
- Height: 27 m (89 ft)
- Length: 257 m (843 ft)

Reservoir
- Catchment area: 4,350 km^{2} (1,680 mi^{2})

Power Station
- Commission date: 1951/1952
- Turbines: 2 x 22.5 MW (30,200 hp) Kaplan-type
- Installed capacity: 45 MW (60,000 hp)
- Annual generation: 206 206 GWh (740 TJ)

Cathaleen's Fall hydroelectric power station is a hydroelectric plant located on the River Erne at Ballyshannon in County Donegal, Ireland. Also known as Ballyshannon, it is owned and operated by the ESB Group. The plant consists of two Kaplan turbines providing a combined capacity of 45 MW (60,000 hp) within a concrete gravity dam 257 m (843 ft) long. Constructed between 1946 and 1955, it is the larger of two hydroelectric plants built between Belleek and Ballyshannon at the same time. Despite construction of the dam meaning the destruction of Assaroe Falls, a local beauty spot, Camlin Castle and many other dwellings, there was no local or national resistance to the project. It was the Republic of Ireland's first act of major co-operation with Northern Ireland since independence. The site appears in Conor McPherson's The Weir, to represent the fictional location in the play.

== Design ==
Cathaleen's Fall, also known as Ballyshannon, is a hydroelectric power station on the River Erne in Ireland. The gravity dam is 257 m (843 ft) long and 27 m (89 ft) high. It has three spillway gates, each 26 ft (7.9 m) long. Concrete is used throughout the construction and the generating station is constructed in the modernist style with curved cantilevered stairs and a glass roofed atrium.

The power plant consists of two Kaplan turbines each rated at 22.5 MW (30,200 hp) on a 29 metres (95 feet) head of water, to give a total capacity of 45 MW (60,000 hp). The first turbine was commissioned in 1951 and the second in 1952. The turbines, manufactured by KMW, spin at 187.5 r.p.m. and feed the grid at 110kV via their own 10.5kVA ASEA generators. The average output for the station is 206 GWh a year. The plant was built for, and is now owned and operated by, the Electricity Supply Board (ESB Group).

== Construction ==
Plans to dam the Erne for power had been considered in the 1920s, but it was not until 1946 that construction of dams started at two locations on the river between Belleek and Ballyshannon. Cathaleen's Fall was the larger and more downriver of the two. Water is taken from a catchment area that covers 4,350 km^{2} (1,680 mi^{2}). Construction of the reinforced concrete gravity dam started in 1946 and was complete in 1955. The plant was declared operational on 1 October 1952.

The construction of the plant is important politically as it was the first act of major co-operation between Northern Ireland and the Republic of Ireland since the latter's independence. The project was championed by Basil Brooke, Prime Minister of Northern Ireland, and Seán Lemass, Minister for Industry and Commerce, who promoted the project in their respective parliaments from 1943. Although there was some discussion in the government in the north about the project, joint interest in draining the Erne predates the scheme and subsequent co-operation has been remarkably free from political difficulties.

== Environmental impact ==
The construction of the plant had a major impact on the local beauty spot Assaroe Falls. The salmon run at the Falls was described by Richard Twiss in 1775 as "a scene of such a singular nature, as is not to be found elsewhere, and is as unique to Ireland as bullfights are to Spain." This was lost when the dam was constructed. It also required the destruction of a late seventeenth-century bridge, nearby country houses including Camlin Castle, Stonewold, Laputa and Cliff House and a number of other dwellings. Nevertheless, there was no significant local or national resistance to the project at the time.

The plant has a fish pass to allow salmon runs and a hatchery that produces 500,000 smolts a year, mainly to stock the river. About 4 million elvers are also trapped here to improve eel stocks in the catchment area.

== Cultural significance ==
The site has been used by producers of Conor McPherson's The Weir, with the weir at Cathaleen's Fall representing the fictional location in the play.
