= Assaroe Falls =

Coordinates: 54.500944473°N 8.195475508°W

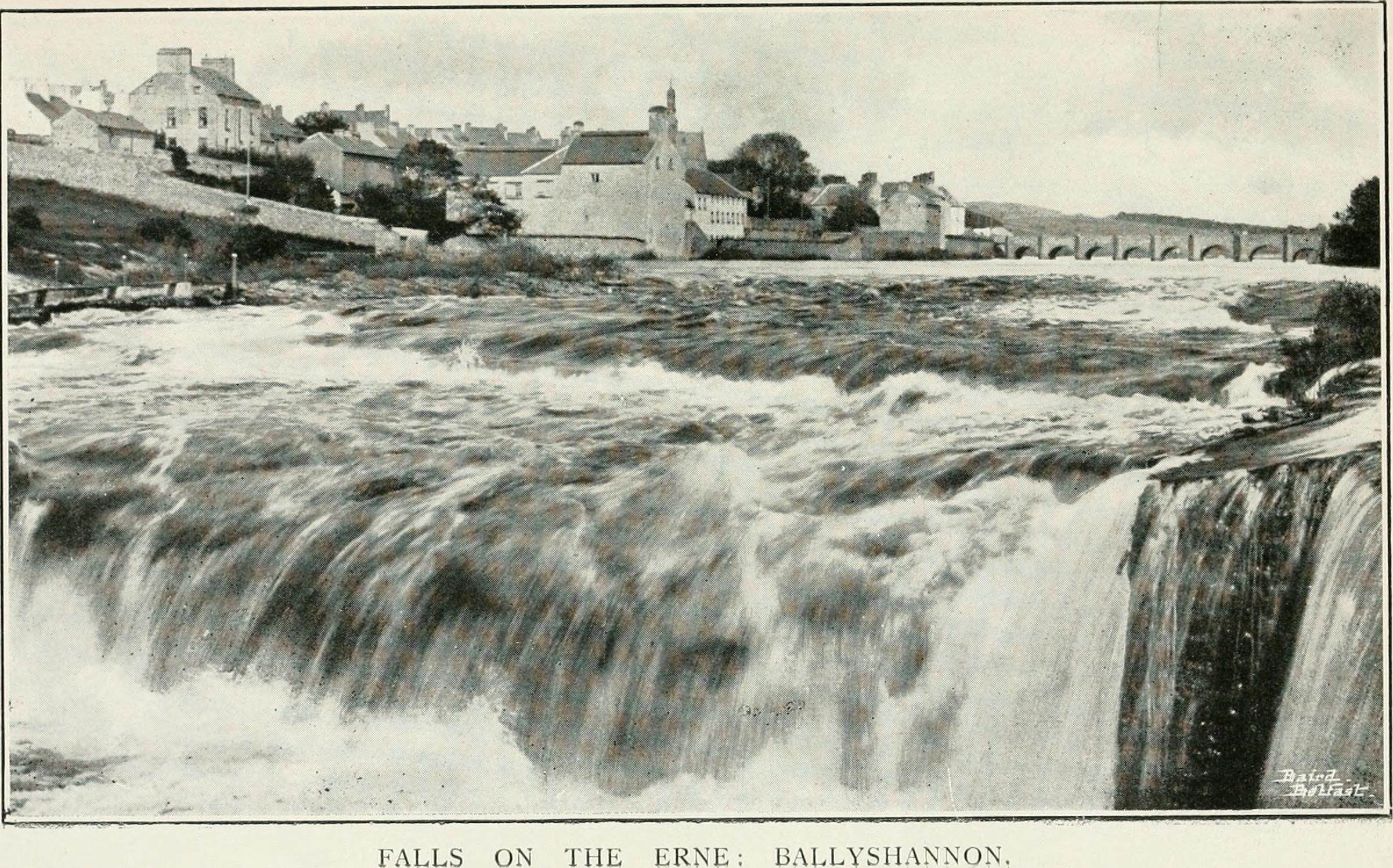
- Image from the Great Northern Railway (Ireland) Company's illustrated guide to the sporting and touring grounds of the north of Ireland (1908), which supposed that passengers arriving at Ballyshannon railway station would be impressed with the river at Ballyshannon.
- Location: Ireland

Assaroe Falls (Irish: Eas Aoidh Ruadh, English: the waterfall of Red Hugh), also known as Cathaleen’s Falls, was a waterfall on the River Erne near Ballyshannon, County Donegal, Ireland. It was named after Aodh Ruadh, who according to tradition, slipped and fell from the waterfall and drowned.

Known for its beauty and famous salmon leap, the water was diverted for construction of the Cathaleen's Fall hydroelectric power station that was built in the town in the late 1940s and early 1950s. A dam was constructed upriver, known as Assaroe Lake, with a channel to lower the riverbed through the town to increase the head of water at the dam in order to drive the turbines.

There is a campaign to restore the historic salmon leap at Assaroe Falls.

== See also ==
- List of waterfalls

== Annalistic references ==
- M836.17. A slaughter was made of the foreigners at Eas Ruaidh.
