= Bundoran Junction railway station =

Railway station in Northern Ireland

Coordinates: 54.4456°N 7.5560°W

Bundoran Junction
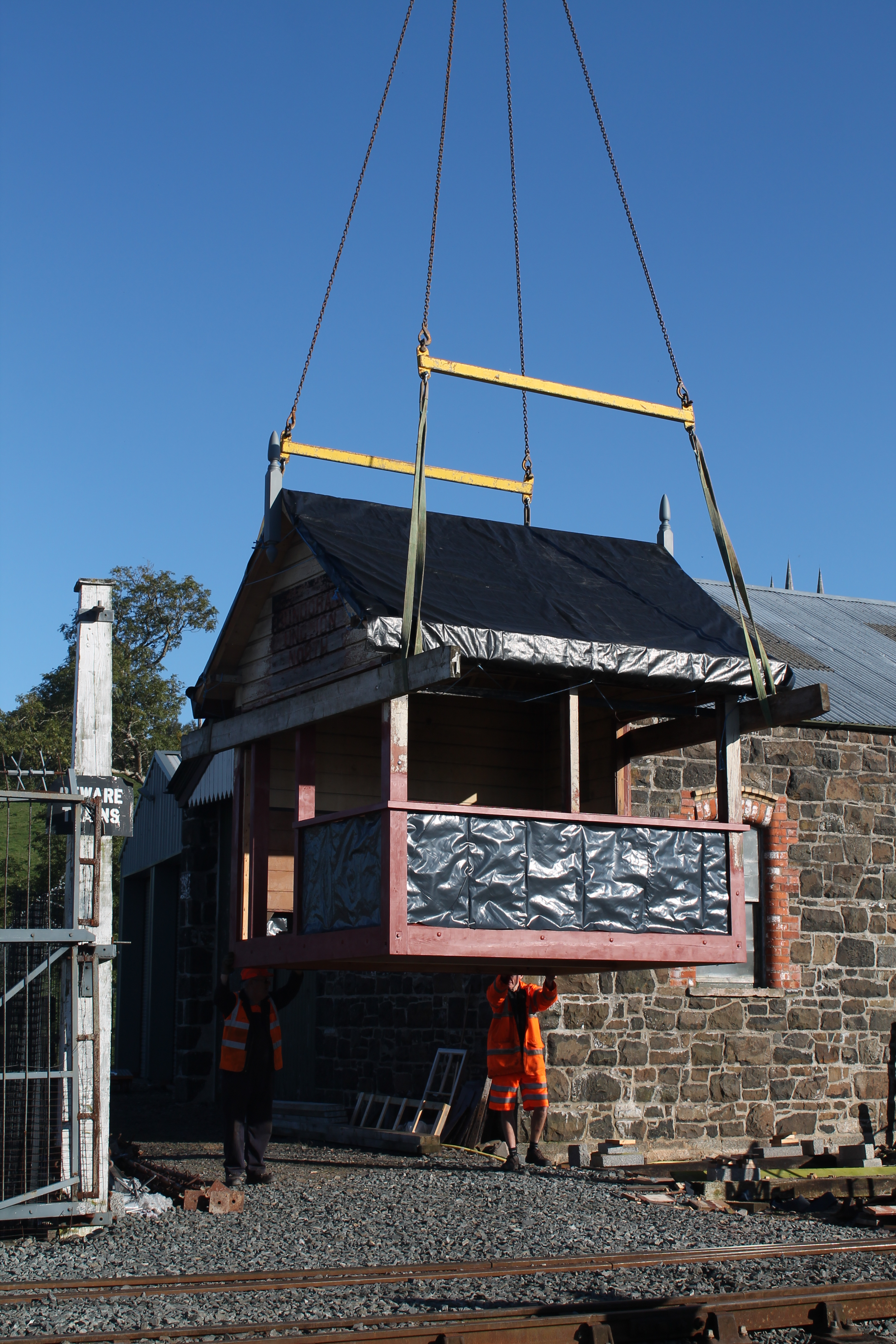
- One of the signal cabins from Bundoran Junction in preservation at the DCDR.

General information
- Location: Kilskeery, County Tyrone, Northern Ireland; UK

History
- Original company: Londonderry and Enniskillen Railway
- Post-grouping: Great Northern Railway (Ireland)

Key dates
- 19 August 1854: Station opens as Lowtherstown Road
- 1 June 1861: Station renamed as Irvinestown
- 1 March 1863: Station renamed as Irvinestown Road
- 13 June 1866: Station renamed as Bundoran Junction
- 1 October 1957: Station closes
Location
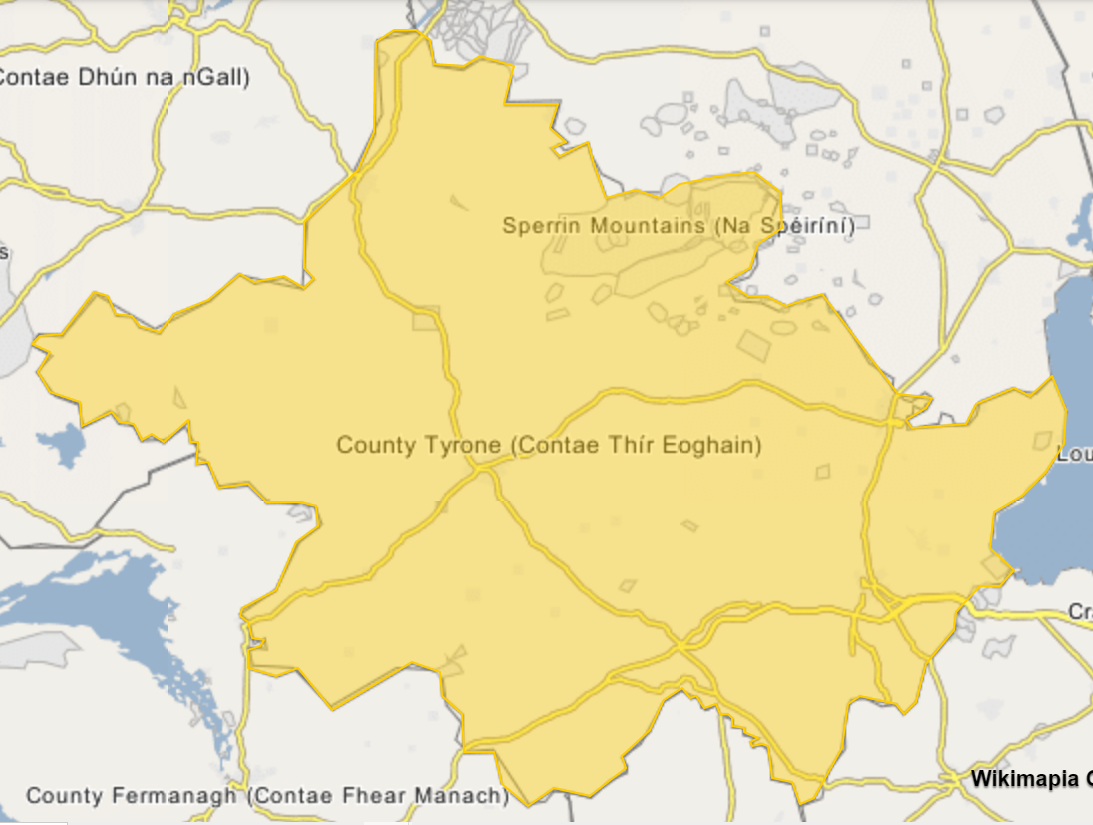
- Location within County Tyrone Location within Northern Ireland

Bundoran Junction railway station served Irvinestown in County Tyrone in Northern Ireland.

The Londonderry and Enniskillen Railway opened the station as Lowtherstown Road on 19 August 1854. It was renamed Irvinestown on 1 March 1863, and Irvinestown Road on 13 June 1866, and finally Bundoran Junction on 13 June 1866 when the Enniskillen and Bundoran Railway opened their line to Bundoran.

It was taken over by the Great Northern Railway (Ireland) in 1883.

It closed on 1 October 1957.

== Preserved Signal Cabin ==
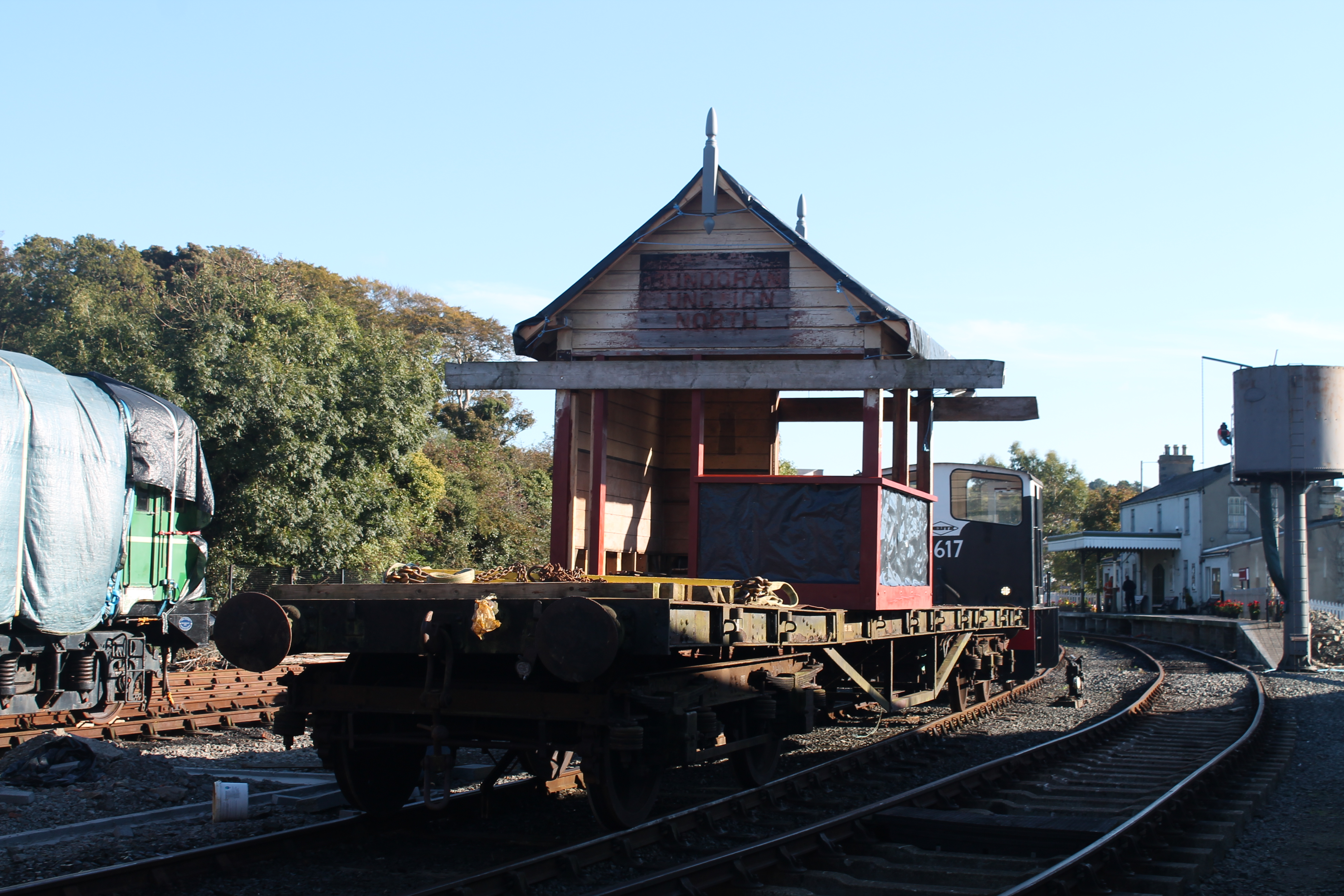
The cabin being moved through Downpatrick yard

One of the signal cabins from Bundoran Junction (North Cabin) survived long enough to make it into preservation at the Downpatrick and County Down Railway. The wooden top half of the cabin was moved by lorry to Downpatrick in 2011. In October 2015, it was craned onto a flat wagon and hauled through Downpatrick station yard. Upon arrival, it was craned off and placed in its permanent position at the Northern end of the station platform. Work is currently (As of July 2016) underway to restore the cabin to its former glory. It is envisioned that it will become fully functional, replacing the ground frame which controls the station headshunt. Upon assuming this new role, the cabin shall be renamed Downpatrick East.

== Routes ==
Preceding station	Disused railways	Following station
Trillick	Londonderry and Enniskillen Railway; Londonderry to Enniskillen	Ballinamallard
Terminus	Enniskillen and Bundoran Railway; Bundoran Junction to Bundoran	Irvinestown
