= Bundoran =

Seaside resort in County Donegal, Ireland

Bundoran Bun Dobhráin (Irish)
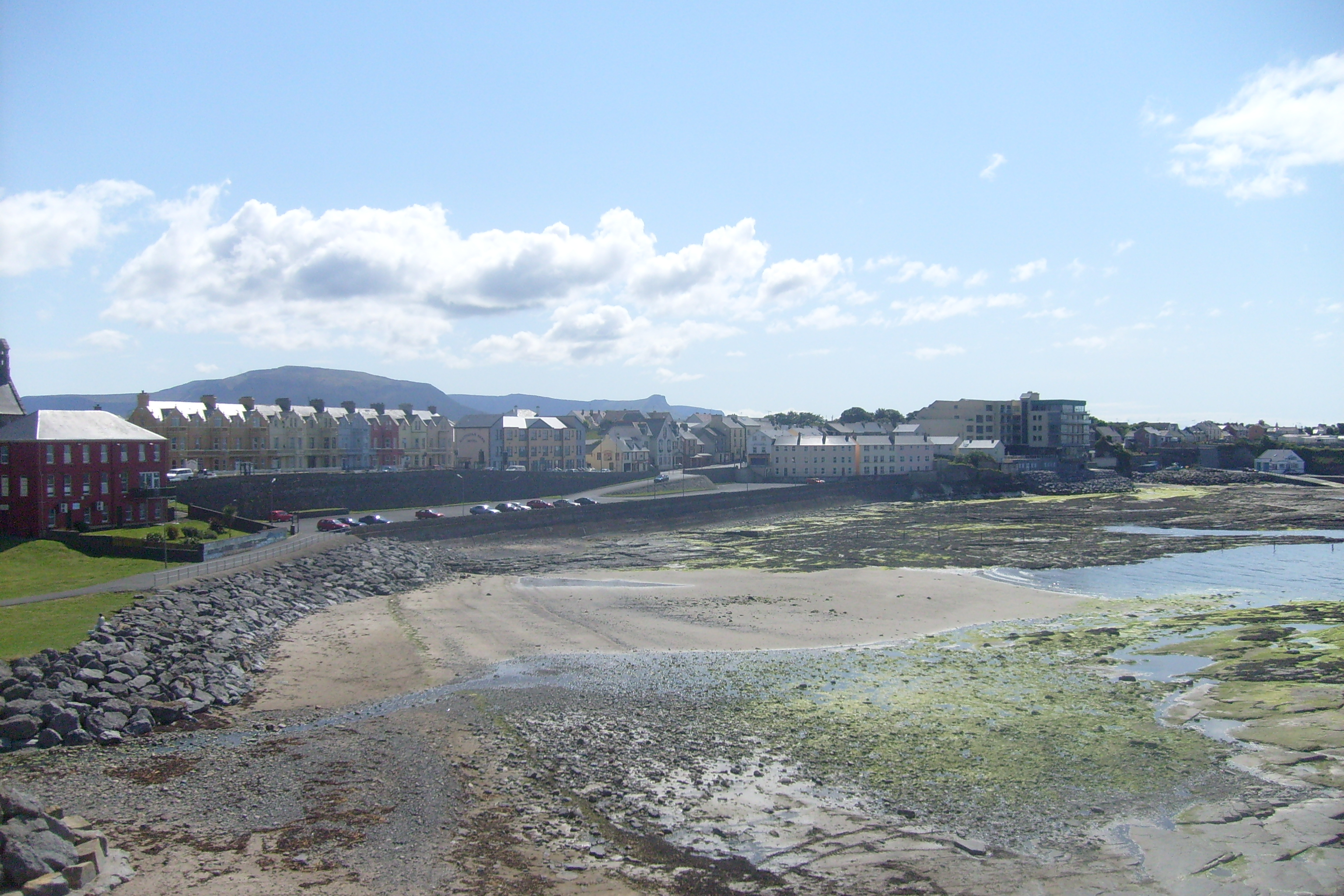
- Bundoran seafront

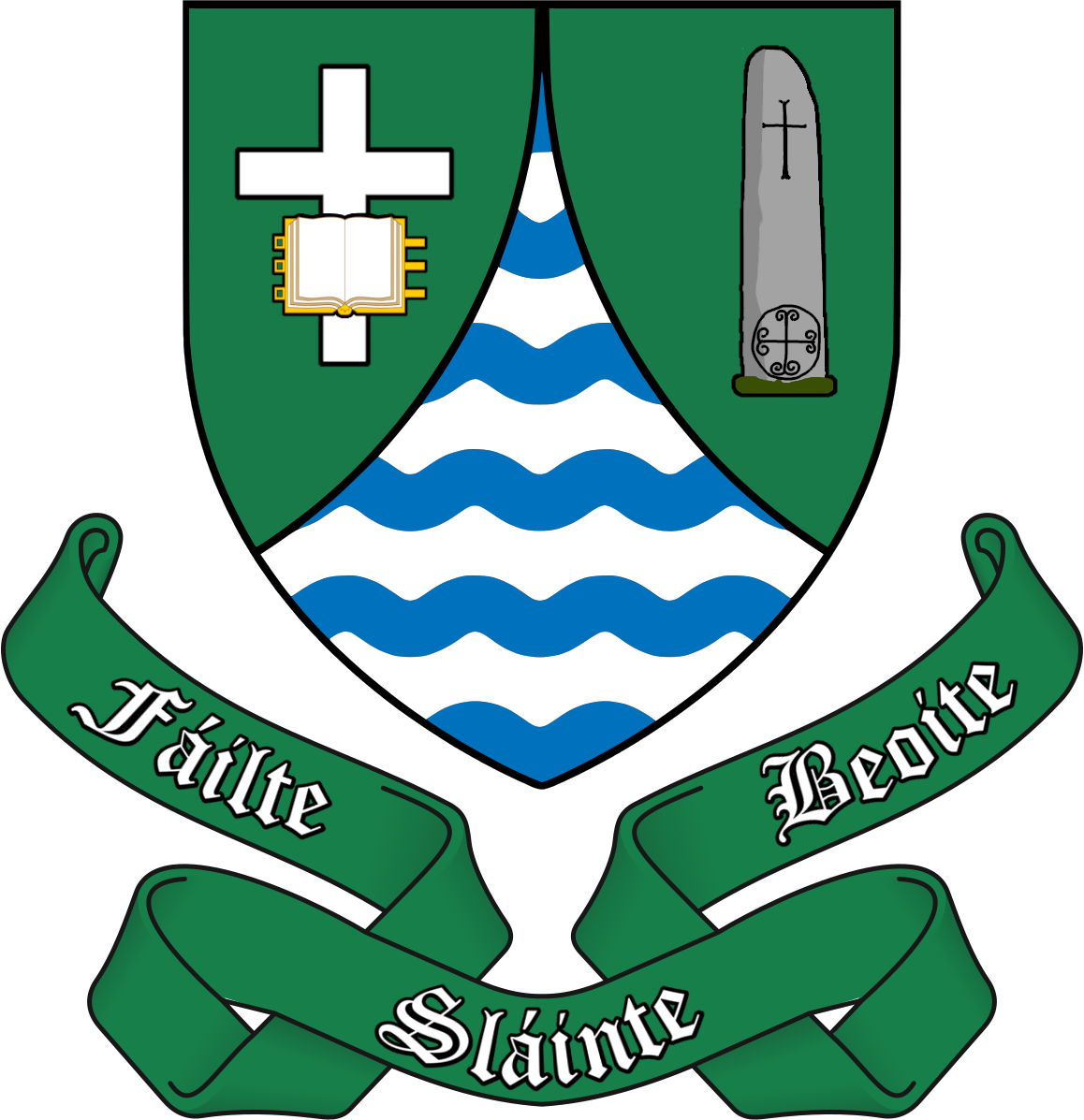
- Coat of arms
- Motto: Fáilte, Sláinte, Beoite "welcome, health, lively"
- Location in Ireland
- Coordinates: 54.4754°N 8.2838°W
- Country: Ireland
- Province: Ulster
- County: County Donegal
- Dáil Éireann: Sligo–Leitrim
- EU Parliament: Midlands–North-West
- Elevation: 12 m (39 ft)

Population (2022)
  - Total: 2,599
- Time zone: UTC±0 (WET)
  - Summer (DST): UTC+1 (IST)
- Eircode routing key: F94
- Telephone area code: +353(0)71
- Irish Grid Reference: G8761
- Website: www.discoverbundoran.com

Bundoran (Irish: Bun Dobhráin) is a town in County Donegal, Ireland. The town includes the townland of Magheracar, in which was located Bundrowes (Bun Drobhaoise), a Franciscan house that served as the principal base of Mícheál Ó Cléirigh during the compilation of the Annals of the Four Masters in the 1630s.

The town is located near the N15 road close to Ballyshannon, and is the most southerly town in Donegal. The town is a tourist seaside resort, and tourism has been at the heart of the local economy since the 18th century. Bundoran is a surfing destination and was listed by National Geographic magazine in 2012 as one of the world's top 20 surf towns.

== History ==
Bundoran, or Bun Dobhráin in Irish (which means 'the foot of the little water'), named after the Doran River was a Gaelic community and coastal settlement that developed into a seaside town. The community had a maritime and fishing heritage linked to the historic Bundrowes fishery, in the townland of Magheracar, Bundoran. According to Ó Caoineachán, this early settlement and coastal location "inspired its development into one of Ireland's most historic watering places and seaside resorts."

Recent research by Ó Caoineachán has also highlighted the historical importance of Bundrowes, located in the Ross area of the townland of Magheracar, Bundoran, as a Franciscan centre and the principal base of Mícheál Ó Cléirigh during the compilation of the Annals of the Four Masters, widely regarded as one of the most important literary and historical works produced in early modern Ireland.

Historically, Bundoran represented the four townlands of Bundrowes (Magheracar), Ardfarna, Drumacrin and Rathmore, as well as its churchlands at Finner.

=== Early documentary evidence ===
In 2025, research by Éamon Ó Caoineachán, a poet, writer and historian and native of Bundoran, identified references to Bundoran dating to 1606, which are now recognised as the earliest official records of the town to date.

The first reference appears in a 1606 letter in the Calendar of the State Papers, Relating to Ireland: 1603–1606, written by Attorney General John Davies. In it, Davies describes a survey of lands on the west side of the River Erne “towards Bundoran,” showing that the place was already recognised by English officials in the early 17th century, and indicating that Bundoran was a Gaelic community and coastal settlement.

A second reference occurs in the manuscript An Attempt to Collect what is Known of the Past History of the Ffolliott Family, which Ó Caoineachán quotes from Staveley's work, showing that the servitor Henry Folliott sought rights to “the fishing salmon and herrings in ... Ballyshannon, Bondrone [Bundoran] and Calbeg.” This source also links Bundoran to the historic Bundrowes fishery, one of the most valuable salmon fisheries in the region. The fishery lay within the district originally called Bundrowes, the earlier name for the West End of the present-day townland of Magheracar in modern Bundoran. This indicates that Bundoran and Bundrowes were historically interconnected, forming a continuous maritime and fishing community.

These 1606 references predate the previously earliest known record, a 1653 deposition by Hugh Gaskein, an apprentice butcher from Sligo, who mentioned Bundoran while giving evidence about events during the 1641 Rebellion.

In the early 17th century, Bundrowes Friary, located in the Ross area of the townland of Magheracar in Bundoran, attained wider historical significance as a Franciscan centre and as the principal base of Mícheál Ó Cléirigh during the compilation of the Annals of the Four Masters. Compiled between 1632 and 1636, the annals are widely regarded as one of the most important literary and historical works produced in early modern Ireland. Documentary evidence preserved in Franciscan archival material, including references in the Louvain Papers, confirms Ó Cléirigh's sustained presence at Bundrowes and the role of the local Franciscan community in supporting the work.

In 1689 a skirmish was fought near Bundoran between a Jacobite force under Sir Connell Ferrall and the retreating Protestant garrison of Sligo.

William Cole, Viscount Enniskillen, built Bundoran Lodge, his summer home, in 1777. This building still stands on Bayview Avenue and is now called Homefield House. The Viscount seems to have started a trend amongst his contemporaries as more of them discovered Bundoran and visited it to enjoy the seaside and what were believed to be its health benefits.

=== Public rights of way ===
The rights of the people to have access to the seashore were blocked by a local landlord but the locals found a champion in the parish priest Canon Kelaghan who fought through the courts in 1870 to ensure that the pathways and roads to the beach remained open to the public. Canon Kelaghan also had the present Catholic church built in 1859.

=== The railway ===
The opening of the Enniskillen and Bundoran Railway (E&BR) in 1868 connected Bundoran railway station with Ireland's growing railway network and made the town more accessible from Belfast, Dublin and other population centres on the east and north-east coasts of Ireland. The Great Northern Railway (GNR) operated the E&BR line from 1876 and absorbed the company in 1896.

In this period Bundoran emerged as one of Ireland's most popular seaside resorts. By the end of the 19th century it had become one of the main seaside resorts in Ulster. Hotels and lodging houses were opened around the town and the GNR built the Great Northern Hotel, one of Bundoran's best-known landmarks.

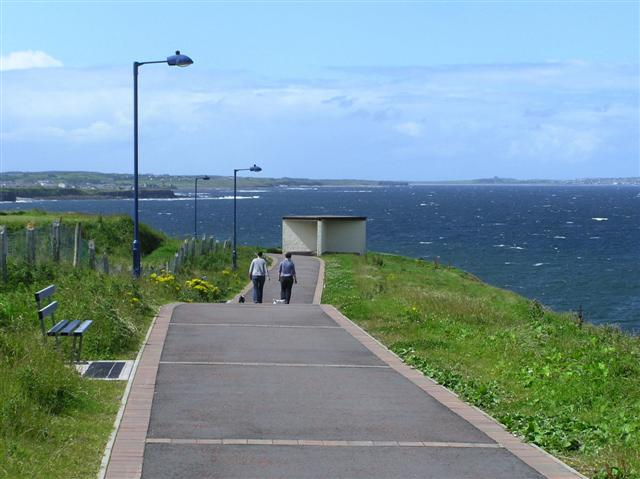
Rougey Cliff Walk

During The Emergency of 1939–45 the GNR introduced the Bundoran Express that linked Dublin and Bundoran via Dundalk and Enniskillen. It also carried pilgrims to and from Pettigo, which was the nearest station for Lough Derg in County Donegal. There were also through trains between Bundoran and Belfast.

The partition of Ireland in 1922 turned the boundary with County Fermanagh into an international frontier. Henceforth Bundoran's only railway link with the rest of the Irish Free State was via Northern Ireland, and as such was subject to delays for customs inspections. The Government of Northern Ireland closed much of the GNR network on its side of the border in 1957, including the E&BR as far as the border. This gave the Republic no practical alternative but to allow the closure of the line between the border and Bundoran. Thereafter the nearest railheads for Bundoran were Sligo in the Republic and Omagh in Northern Ireland, until in 1965 the Ulster Transport Authority closed the line through Omagh as well.

Today, the closest railway stations to Bundoran are Sligo Mac Diarmada Station in Sligo Town and Waterside Station in Derry.

=== Central Hotel fire ===
On 8 August 1980, a fire broke out at The Central Hotel in the heart of the town. Ten people died as a result, including five children. In September 2008, the Church reinstalled a stained glass window made by the world-renowned Harry Clarke (1889–1931), a window which for many years was lying hidden in the parish house of the local Catholic church. The council also erected a carved stone monument bench on Central Lane (beside The Central Hotel) in August 2010 as a mark of respect listing the names of the ten people who lost their lives.

== Attractions ==
=== Bundoran beach ===
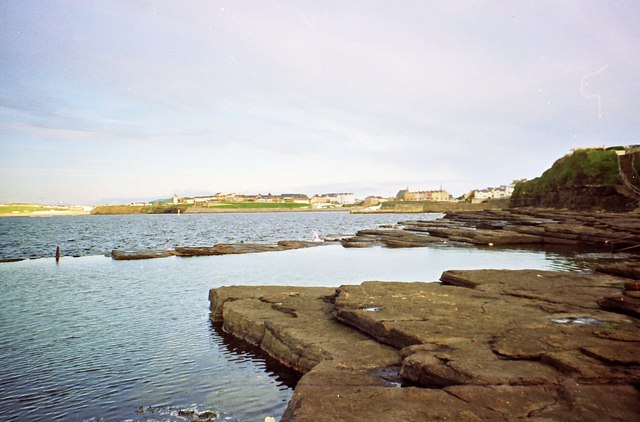
The natural swimming pool

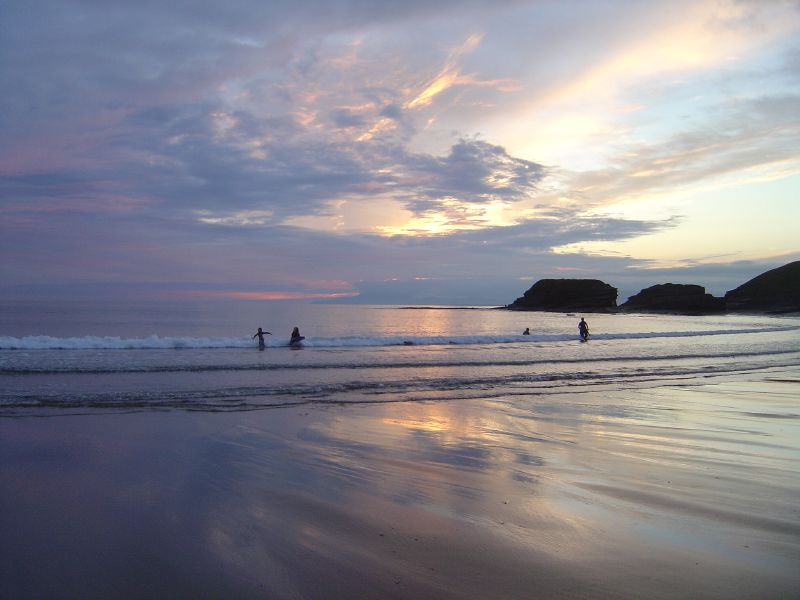
Bundoran strand at dusk

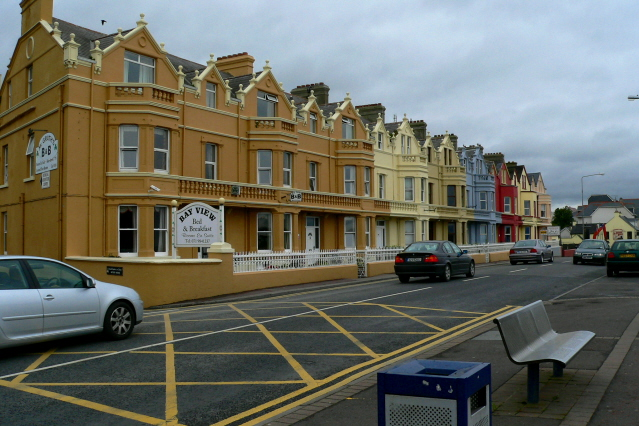
A row of colorful B&Bs on the seafront

For almost two centuries people have visited Bundoran beach on hot summer days. The tradition of bathing boxes began in Victorian times. They were primarily used by members of the gentry, who were reticent about undressing in public. The boxes were pushed, on wheels, to the water's edge and the customer entered the box through one door, put on their bathing costume and stepped out another door to enter the sea. The box remained there until the bather was finished, dried off and fully clothed again. The bathing box was brought back to its original position on the beach, ready for the next client.

Stationary bathing boxes were introduced in the early 1900s. They proved more amenable and cheaper to the public. In the 1920s, Mrs Elizabeth Travers and her brother-in-law, Bilshie Travers hired the boxes from the local Council. For 3 old pennies a customer hired a bathing costume and for 6 old pennies, they could hire "the whole package" which consisted of a bathing cap, costume and towel. A familiar sight on the beach in the 1950s and 1960s was "The Duck". This was a former British Army amphibious craft that ferried tourists out onto the Bay. Despite being prone to breakdown, it was an attraction at the time.

The Main Beach in Bundoran has been awarded a Blue Flag for each year of the existence of the competition, bar 2019.

=== Coastal walks ===
The Promenade to Tullan Strand Starting at Bundoran Bridge and looking out towards the sea is Cladach Leathan (the broad beach) on which lies Bill Ireland's Stone, named after the rescue of a shipwrecked sailor. Beyond it is the surf break of The Peak. At the end of the Promenade is Carraig na nÉan (the rock of the birds). The pump house that overlooks the bay was built by local landlords the Hamiltons in 1861. Close by is Carraig a Choiscéim (the rock of the step). Next to it is Poll Uain (Lambs' Hole) which is also known as the Horse Pool. The Thrupenny Pool was named after the price of admission (3d. in pre-decimal currency). The main beach is called Trá na Draina (the strand of the strong) where according to legend the giant Culina wrestled with his son, both unaware of each other's identity. The small stream that enters the sea on the beach is Sruthán na Cúil Fhinne (the rivulet of the fair girl). The coral and brachiopod fossils embedded in the rocks of Rougey are over 300 million years old. At the tip of Rougey is Aughrus (the peninsula of the steeds), where the warhorses of Conall Gulbán and the O‘Donnells grazed. Passing by the golf links is Pól Uaine and Pól Tóbí, both fishing spots. Next is the ‘Puffing Hole’. Below is Tullan Strand, where the first inhabitants of the area used flint from the rocks to make tools.

=== Fairy bridges & wishing chair ===
The Fairy Bridges and Wishing Chair are located on the Roguey Walk near Tullan Strand in the town. This natural sea arch bridge was said to be Bundoran's first tourism attraction when the town became popular in the late 1700s. It features in a painting by artist Helen Allingham and in 2020 won a TripAdvisor Travellers Choice award placing it in the top 10% of attractions on the review site across the globe.

=== Waterworld ===
The Waterworld complex opened in 1991 with its development coming about as a result of major storm damage in 1988 along the seafront. The indoor water park includes a wave pool, rapids, slides that were added in 1994 with the addition of an external tower, and a three-lane multi-slide and toddler pool which were added in 2013 as a result of a multi-million euro investment by its owners Donegal County Council.

=== Adventure World ===
Adventure World, near Waterworld, includes waltzing horses, water zorbing and water bumper cars, for younger families. A big wheel is used in Galway's Christmas market, where it is located outside the Great Southern Hotel.

=== Amusement arcades ===
Macks amusements are owned by a son of Sean McEniff. There are several hundred gaming machines and several dozen amusement machines. At its entrance is a large statue of Neptune.

=== Hotels, hostels, caravans and campsites ===
Bundoran has many hotels, among the biggest are The Allingham Arms (132 rooms), The Great Northern (102) and The Holyrood (91). Fitzgerald's Hotel, with 16 rooms, is the town's smallest and first opened in 1941, retaining an atmosphere from the past. As well as hotels, a 2018 report recorded sixteen caravan sites and campsites (consisting of 4,312 beds), several hundred self-catering residences and nine hostels.

=== Brennan's Criterion Bar ===
Brennan's Criterion Bar opened in the area in 1900 and shut down in 2018.

== Transport ==
=== Roads ===
The opening in April 2006 of the Bundoran/Ballyshannon bypass has made the resort more accessible. Sligo is 35 kilometres (22 miles) south from Bundoran along the scenic Atlantic coast. The Drowes River, where the southern part of the bypass commences and which separates County Leitrim from County Donegal, is also the demarcation point between the provinces of Connacht to the south and Ulster to the north.

=== Rail ===
Bundoran railway station opened on 13 June 1866 but finally closed on 1 October 1957. The New Council Offices carpark is where the Bundoran Railway Station once stood.

The nearest railway station today is Sligo Mac Diarmada Station in Sligo Town, where trains run to Dublin Connolly and are operated by Iarnród Éireann. Buses from Bundoran to Sligo stop at Sligo bus station which is adjacent to Sligo Mac Diarmada Station.

=== Coach/bus transport ===
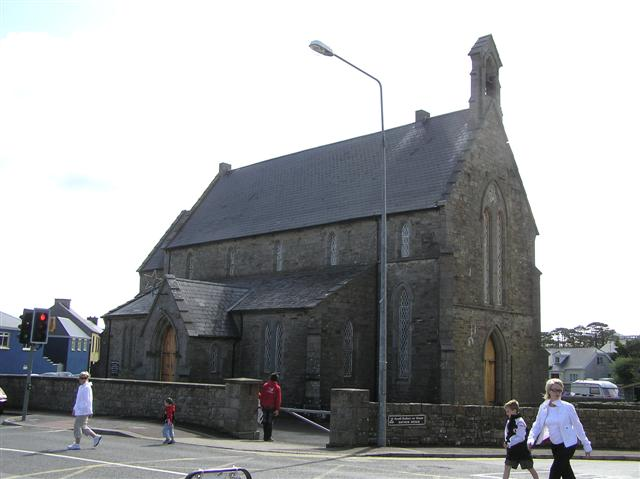
Christ Church, Church of Ireland in Bundoran

Bus Éireann buses connect Bundoran to Sligo Mac Diarmada Station in Sligo Town. Bus Éireann also run a regular service, several times a day, from Derry to Galway, via Letterkenny and Bundoran. Feda O'Donnell (Bus Feda) runs from Crolly to Galway via Gweedore, Letterkenny, Donegal Town, Ballyshannon and Bundoran to the west of Ireland, including Sligo and Galway, with an additional service to Limerick during the college term. There is also an Ulsterbus service (194/195) from Bundoran to Enniskillen.

There are two Local Link buses services: 982 Ballyshannon to Sligo and 983 Kinlough to Ballyshannon.

There are a number of bus stops in the town, though the main ones are the East bus stop and West bus stop. Feda O'Donnell and Local Link both stop at the Tourist Office.

== Developments ==
Development in Bundoran has been triggered by its popularity as a seaside destination and the availability of tax reliefs for the development of holiday homes in the past. Thousands of music fans attend the Bundoran Sea Sessions Surf and Music Festival every June.

The Astoria Ballroom was built in 1953 at a time when dances were a major social activity, and showbands would entertain large crowds at the venue. In 1990, Meatloaf also played at the ballroom. In November 2008, it was destroyed by fire. In 2024, conditional planning permission was given for construction of a funfair and waterpark on the former site of the ballroom.

In 2019 the town was announced as Failte Ireland's Destination Town for county Donegal paving the way for investment of €500,000 from the tourism development authority to enhance the town.

== Education ==
On Railway Road stands the St Louis Convent School, which was built in 1892. The buildings included a School and residence for the Sisters of St Louis. One of the buildings still stands today. In 1958, the Sisters of St Louis moved their Monaghan school, St. Martha's Industrial School, to Bundoran on a site beside the Old Grand Central Cinema in the premises known as The Sea View Hotel. The school closed in 1966. After its closure, St. Martha's was accused of child abuse and in June 2002 legal action was brought against it by numerous former pupils. One account in 1963 was where some girls had run away from the school and had their hair cropped when they returned. An investigation at the time resulted in two nuns being removed.

The St Joseph's orphanages were erected from funds bequeathed by the late Miss Sarah Crudden, Newtownbutler. In August 1957, St Joseph's was closed and transferred to St Louis under the name "St. Martha's". These buildings later became known as Ard Lughaidh Secondary School, much of the building was stone and also had a large sports and theatre hall all of which in 2006 the VEC demolished them. All that is left on the lands is the extension area used till the 1980s by 'live in' students of the Ard Lughaidh. This is now under the Donegal Adventure Centre ownership. Due to the decreasing class sizes in Ard Lughaigh in the 1990s the school faced closure and some students moved to Ballyshannon. Some of the St. Louis nuns moved to the St. Louis building at Railway Road, however, a lot moved away.

== Sport ==
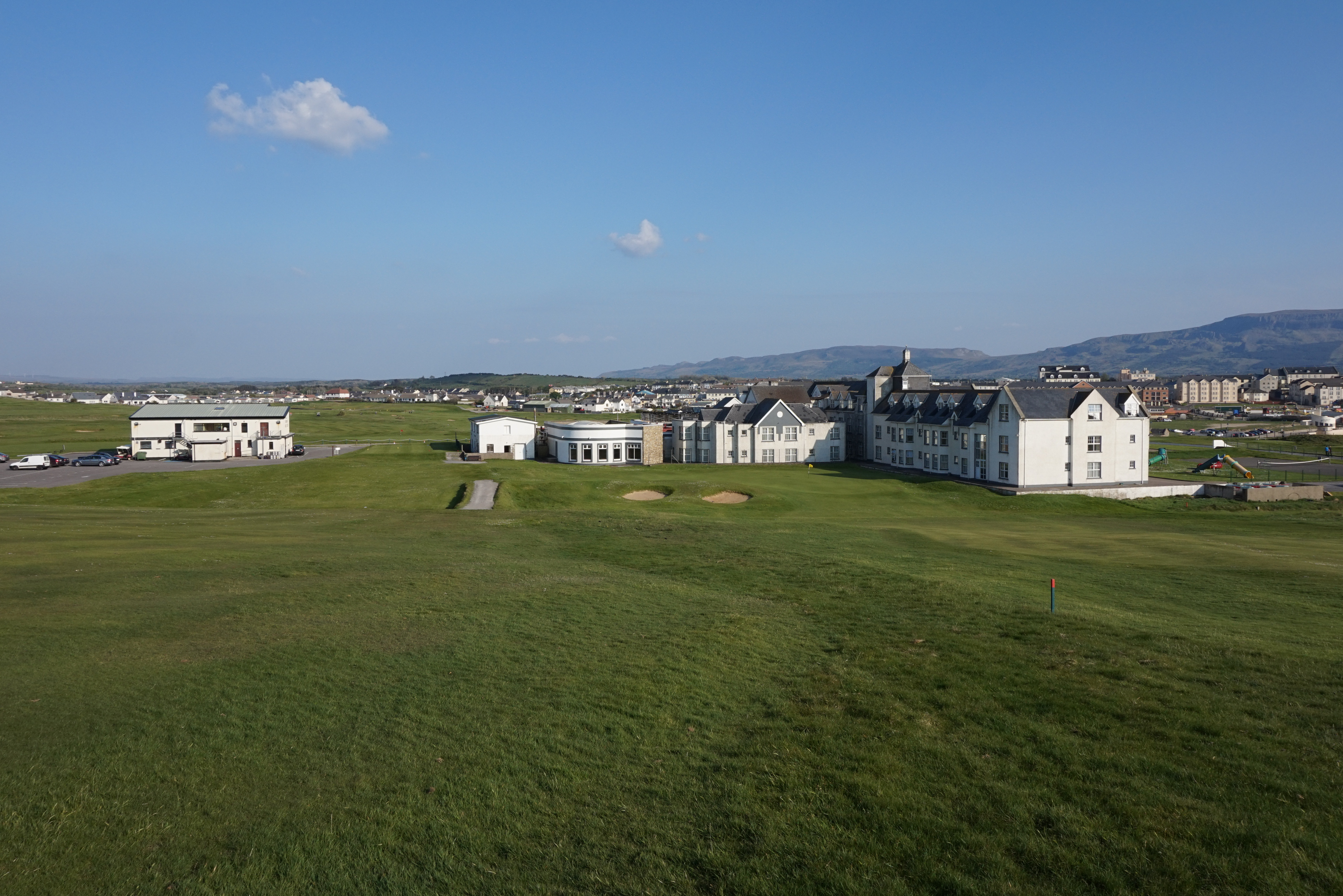
Bundoran Golf Club

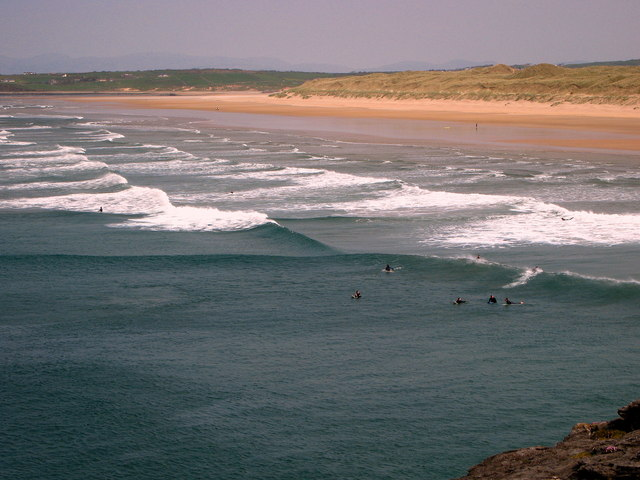
Tullan Strand

=== Surfing ===
Bundoran is noted as a surfing location and known as the Surf Capital of Ireland. Surfing locations include The Peak, Tullan Strand and nearby Rossnowlagh beach. The town hosted the European Surfing Championships in 1985 and again in 2011 and has been consistently named as the top beginner beach in Ireland by Red Bull Surf breaks in the town are suitable for beginners, intermediate and professionals.

=== Golf ===
There is an 18-hole golf course in Bundoran. The golf club was founded in 1894. The course is located on the historic Great Northern Railway Company site, the old railway sleepers encompass the Golf course which enjoys the most breathtaking and scenic views of the Atlantic Ocean. The course is a challenging experience despite its short length. Designed by Harry Vardon, the golf course is a testing 18 hole, Par 70. His design philosophy was “to give pleasure to golfers of all degrees”.

=== Gaelic games ===
In the 1920s the location of Bundoran on the railway line made the Bundoran local ground a convenient venue for many big games. The GAA club grounds were purchased in 1938. The club was reorganised and renamed Réalt na Mara, meaning "The Star of the Sea". The football park has undergone many developments throughout the years. The ground was levelled in 1947 and enclosed in 1951. The club changing rooms were constructed in 1972.

The juniors were successful in both the 1956 and 1960 Championships. In 1963, Réalt na Mara joined with Ballyshannon club Aodh Ruadh to become St Joseph's. That team included many players that contributed to the Donegal county team, including Brian McEniff and the former Donegal County Council Manager Michael McLoone. In 1977 the club was again divided into two clubs, one each for the towns of Bundoran and Ballyshannon.

In 1979, Bundoran beat Ballybofey in a nail-biting one-point victory to win the Senior Championship. Local man Brian McEniff led Donegal to the 1992 All-Ireland Senior Football Championship Final, in which they defeated Dublin in the final 0–18 to 0–14. Bundoran was the scene of enormous celebrations for almost a month afterwards.

In 2015, Réalt Na Mara won the Donegal Intermediate Football Championship title and went on to reach the Ulster final where they were defeated by Loughinisland.

=== Greyhound racing ===
A greyhound racing track was opened by the Bundoran Greyhound Racing Company Ltd in the town during October 1931. The construction cost was £800 in £1 shares and was set up by James Cassidy (cattle dealer) and John Conlan (merchant). The directors also included J.T.Flavin, D.Judge, P.Gorman and W.Hudson. On 21 December 1934 notice had been given that after three months the company would be dissolved but there is evidence that the track was still active or had re-opened during 1948.

=== Football ===
The International Football Association Board (IFAB), the body that determines the Laws of the Game, met at the Great Northern Hotel in Bundoran in 1909.

== Twin towns ==
Bundoran is a member of the Douzelage, a town twinning association of towns across the European Union and United Kingdom, and is there for twinned with:

- Agros, Cyprus
- Altea, Spain
- Asikkala, Finland
- Bad Kötzting, Germany
- Bellagio, Italy
- Chojna, Poland
- Granville, France
- Holstebro, Denmark
- Houffalize, Belgium
- Judenburg, Austria
- Kőszeg, Hungary
- Marsaskala, Malta
- Meerssen, Netherlands
- Niederanven, Luxembourg
- Oxelösund, Sweden
- Preveza, Greece
- Rokiškis, Lithuania
- Rovinj, Croatia
- Sesimbra, Portugal
- Sherborne, England, United Kingdom
- Sigulda, Latvia
- Siret, Romania
- Škofja Loka, Slovenia
- Sušice, Czech Republic
- Tryavna, Bulgaria
- Türi, Estonia
- Zvolen, Slovakia

== Notable people ==
- Maeve Duffy, electrical engineer
- Richie Fitzgerald, surfer
- Liam MacDaid (born 1945), former Roman Catholic prelate, Bishop Emeritus of Clogher
- Sean McEniff (1936–2017), former businessman and Fianna Fáil politician
- Brian McEniff (born 1942), former Gaelic football player and manager
- Screaming Orphans, Celtic pop band

== Bundoran in popular culture ==
The song "Beautiful Bundoran" was written c. 1960 by Mai O'Higgins from Dungarvan, Waterford with the melody written by Bertie Flynn. It is believed that Mai had never actually been to Bundoran and had written the song from a brochure of Donegal. It has been covered by several artists most notably Kathleen Fitzgerald and the Fitzgerald Ceili Band, Jim Finnegan and Sinéad O'Connor for the film The Butcher Boy.

== See also ==
- List of populated places in Ireland
- List of twin towns and sister cities in the Republic of Ireland
- List of RNLI stations
- Surfing in Ireland
- Wild Atlantic Way
