= Pettigo railway station =

Railway station in Ireland

Pettigo
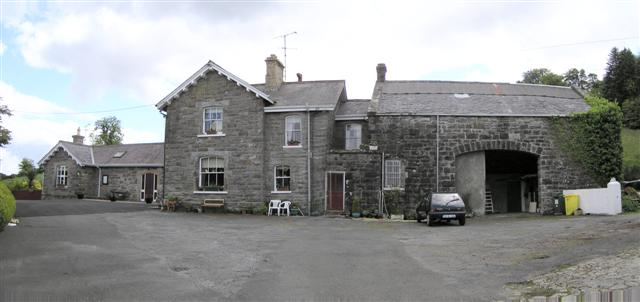
- Pettigo railway station. Now a private house.

General information
- Location: Station Road, Pettigo; County Donegal; Ireland
- Coordinates: 54.547427°N 7.831197°W

History
- Original company: Enniskillen and Bundoran Railway
- Post-grouping: Great Northern Railway (Ireland)

Key dates
- 13 June 1866: Station opens
- 1 October 1957: Station closes
Location

Pettigo railway station served Pettigo in County Donegal in the Republic of Ireland.

== History ==
The Enniskillen and Bundoran Railway opened the station on 13 June 1866. Services were provided by the Irish North Western Railway. The station's main purpose was to offer easy access for the considerable pilgrim traffic to St Patrick's Purgatory on Lough Derg.

The railway was taken over by the Great Northern Railway (Ireland) in 1876 and became the Bundoran branch line. Pettigo became a customs station following the partition of Ireland in 1923 due to its close proximity to the border of the newly crowned Northern Ireland and both surrounding stations being in county Fermanagh, which became part of Northern Ireland but not county Donegal.

To resolve this problem, the Bundoran Express was introduced in 1941 to provide a non-stop service connecting to Dublin, Pettigo was the only station on the line served by this service, which also called at Dundalk and Clones. The line was closed on 1 October 1957 when the Northern Ireland Board made the GNRI close most of its cross-border lines to save money.

== Routes ==
Preceding station	Disused railways	Following station
Kesh	Enniskillen and Bundoran Railway; Enniskillen to Bundoran	Castlecaldwell
