= Maeve Duffy =

Irish electrical engineer

Maeve C. Duffy is an Irish electrical engineer whose research involves planar magnetic components for electronic circuitry including inductors and transformers, and their applications in electric power conversion, energy harvesting, and wireless power transfer. She is a professor of electrical and electronic engineering at the University of Galway.

== Education and career ==
Duffy was born in Bundoran in County Donegal, Ireland. She studied electrical and electronic engineering at the University of Galway, receiving a bachelor's degree in 1992 and completing her Ph.D. in 1997, under the supervision of Ger Hurley.

The became a researcher at the Tyndall National Institute in Cork, before returning to the University of Galway as a lecturer in 2001. She was promoted to senior lecturer / associate professor in 2020, and gave her inaugural lecturer as a full professor in November 2024.

== Recognition ==
Duffy was named to the 2026 class of IEEE Fellows, "for contributions to advances in the modelling of planar magnetics and wireless power".
