= Dehong Xu =

Chinese professor

Mark Dehong Xu is a Professor and Director of Power Electronics Institute at the National Engineering Research Center of Applied Power Electronics in Zhejiang University, China.

== Education ==
Xu got his Ph.D. degree from the Department of Electrical Engineering of Zhejiang University in Hangzhou, China, in 1989. He serves on the faculty of Zhejiang University as a full professor, since 1996, and prior to it, for a year, was a visiting professor at the Department of Electrical Engineering in Tokyo University in Tokyo, Japan.

== Career ==
From June to December of 2000, Xu was with the Center of Power Electronics System in Virginia Tech and in 2006 he joined Power Electronics Lab in ETH Zurich in Zurich, Switzerland. Xu was a member of the IEEE Power Electronics Society from 2006 to 2008. He serves as an associate editor of the IEEE Transactions on Sustainable Energy and the IEEE Transactions on Power Electronics. He also served as chairman of the IEEE International Symposium on Industrial Electronics, the IEEE International Symposium on Power Electronics for Distributed Generation Systems, the IEEE Power Electronics and Applications, and the International Future Energy Challenge Competition.

Xu is a co-editor-in-Chief of the Electrical Engineer Handbook, which was published in 2008 by Chinese Electric Power Press.

== Awards and recognitions ==
In 2006, Xu was awarded by the Ministry of Education of the People's Republic of China for his contribution to the research on power electronics and application, after writing a book titled Power Electronics which was selected for the National Planning Text Book Award in August the same year.

Xu was elected a Fellow of the Institute of Electrical and Electronics Engineers (IEEE) in 2013 for his contributions to power electronic applications to renewable energy systems and in 2014 he became a Fellow of the American Association for the Advancement of Science.
