= Khai Ngo =

- Born: 1950s
- Education: California State Polytechnic University, Pomona (B.S.); California Institute of Technology (M.S., Ph.D)
- Occupations: Professor of electrical and computer engineering at Virginia Tech
- Awards: IEEE Fellow

Khai D. T. Ngo (born 1950s) is a Professor of electrical and computer engineering at Virginia Tech in Blacksburg, Virginia. He was named a Fellow of the Institute of Electrical and Electronics Engineers (IEEE) in 2015 for his contributions to the unified synthesis and modeling of switched-mode converters.

Ngo obtained B.S. degree from California State Polytechnic University, Pomona in 1979. He then got his M.S. and Ph.D. degrees from the California Institute of Technology in 1980 and 1984, respectively, all of which were in electrical and electronic engineering.
