= Termon River =

River in the north of Ireland

Coordinates: 54°32′N 7°51′W

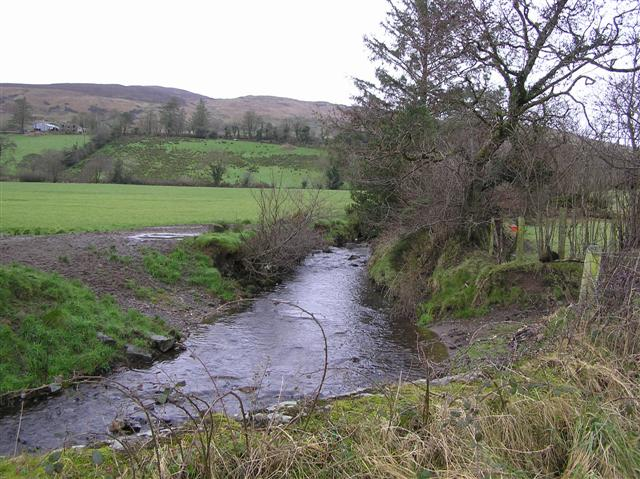
Termon River, flowing past Tullylark

Parts of the Termon River form the border between County Donegal in Ireland and County Fermanagh in the United Kingdom. It rises near Scraghy and flows into Lough Erne about two miles from Pettigo. The length is approximately 16 km (10 mi).

Based on maps of the international border, the river only forms the actual border line in patches of the frontier.
