= Cursino Jacobina =

Cursino Brandao Jacobina is a professor of electrical engineering at the Federal University of Campina Grande in Paraíba, Brasil. He was named Fellow of the Institute of Electrical and Electronics Engineers (IEEE) in 2014 for contributions to the development of power converters and machine drives.
