= Michael Negnevitsky =

Professor and IEEE fellow

Michael Negnevitsky is professor of power engineering and computational intelligence at the University of Tasmania. He is also director of their Centre for Renewable Energy and Power Systems. Negnevitsky received his bachelor's degree in electrical engineering from the Belarusian National Technical University in 1978. He undertook a PhD at the same university, graduating in 1983. He is a fellow of the IEEE, Engineers Australia and the Japan Society for the Promotion of Science. Negnevitsky serves on the editorial board of several journals, including Energies. He has published a book entitled "Artificial Intelligence: A Guide to Intelligent System, 3e".
