= Yungtaek Jang =

Yungtaek Jang is a Korean-American electrical engineer. He works at Delta Products Corporation in Fremont, California. He was named a Fellow of the Institute of Electrical and Electronics Engineers (IEEE) in 2016 for his cont/ributions to efficiency optimization of AC-DC power supplies.

== Early life ==
He obtained a Bachelor of Science degree in Engineering from Yonsei University in 1982 in South Korea. He earned his Masters degree from the University of Colorado Boulder in 1991. In 1995, after four years of study under W. Erickson and Dragan Maksimovic, Jang completed his Doctor of Philosophy, with his thesis "Application of Resonant Technique for Three-Phase High Power Factor Rectification and Integrated Magnetic Converters".

== Career ==
Jang is an expert in performance optimization of switch-mode power supplies for data processing and telecommunications equipment. He invented power conversion circuits and techniques that have enabled significant efficiency and power-density improvements of AC-DC power supplies in a cost effective manner. Since 1998, power supplies that incorporate his inventions have been deployed in server, networking, and telecom equipment made by IBM, HP, Dell, and Cisco, as well as in datacenters run by firms such as Google and Facebook. In the late 1990s, a typical efficiency and power density of AC-DC computer power supplies was below 80% and 5 W/in^{3}, respectively.

=== Power supplies ===
His research was instrumental in designing power supplies with efficiencies in the 90-95% range and power densities in the 20-35-W/in^{3} range. Jang's research focus has been on optimizing performance of single-phase AC-DC boost power-factor-correction (PFC) front-end converters that are an integral part of every AC-DC computer power supply. Specifically, in 1999 he proposed a soft-switching technique for the boost PFC front end that enabled 40-50% loss reduction. The invention employs an active snubber approach to eliminate reverse-recovery-related losses of the boost Si fast-recovery rectifiers. In addition, due to zero-current-switching of the boost switch, cost could be reduced by using IGBT devices instead of more expensive MOSFETs. This approach was employed in all high-performance server power supplies built by his company until the introduction of virtually reverse-recovery-charge-free SiC rectifiers in 2008. It continued to be used in cost-sensitive applications and those requiring low EMI designs. With millions of power supplies deployed, this invention has contributed to significant cumulative energy savings.

Jang contributed to improving power density of high-frequency AC-DC computer power supplies by proposing a unique approach for minimizing the size of the energy-storage (bulk) capacitor of the front-end boost PFC converter. Generally, AC-DC computer power supplies are required to maintain regulated output(s) for 12-20 ms after a line-voltage drop out. In conventionally optimized power supplies, approximately 1-2 uF/W of storage capacitance is required to meet the hold-up-time requirement since only approximately 40% of stored energy is utilized.

In 2002, he introduced the hold-up time extension concept that reduced the required capacitance and, therefore, the bulk-capacitor size by approximately 50% without adversely affecting conversion efficiency. An auxiliary boost converter, active only during line voltage drop outs, is employed to discharge approximately 80% of the stored energy. It has been extensively implemented in power supplies and enabled significant increases in power density, along with significant material savings. The hold-up time extension technique gained more importance in the next generation of computer power supplies implemented with GaN switches that enable efficient switching at much higher frequencies. With the further reduction of power-stage components enabled by increased switching frequencies, the size of energy-storage capacitors that are required to handle hold-up time will become the major obstacle in increasing the power density to 100 W/in^{3} and beyond.

Jang developed a low-cost three-phase, low-harmonic rectifier that uses only two switches and yet matches the efficiency and input-current total harmonic distortion (THD) of the rectifiers that require at least six switches. This converter does not employ active input-current shaping which further reduces its cost and, due to zero-voltage-switching, exhibits improved EMI performance.

Jang also introduced a light-load efficiency optimization technique that significantly improves the efficiency of power converters at loads below 20% of full load.

=== Wireless charging ===
He became a pioneer in wireless charging by demonstrating 4.5-W and 30-W battery chargers in 2000. In 2014, the control concept of the wireless charger was extended to a series resonant converter that makes it possible to work as a bi-directional battery charger for electric vehicles.

== Recognition ==
Jang is a prolific inventor with 29 U.S. patents. In addition, he published 90 papers, including 33 in various IEEE Transactions.

- IEEE Transactions on Power Electronics Prize paper awards for best paper (1996, 2009, and 2013).
