= Josef Drobnik =

Josef Drobnik is an electrical engineer with SPARQ Systems, Inc., in Kingston, Ontario. He was named a Fellow of the Institute of Electrical and Electronics Engineers (IEEE) in 2015 for his work in the development of high performance power converters in industrial applications.
