= Navid Zargari =

Canadian electrical engineer

Navid Zargari is an electrical engineer at Rockwell Automation Canada in Cambridge, Ontario. He was named a Fellow of the Institute of Electrical and Electronics Engineers (IEEE) in 2015 for his contribution to medium-voltage drive technologies and applications.

Navid has more than 12,000 citations for his research publications, which include publications in IEEE Transactions on Power Electronics, IEEE Transactions on Industrial Electronics, and IEEE Journal of Emerging and Selected Topics in Power Electronics.
