= Remus Teodorescu =

- Born: 02.06.1965; Galati
- Occupation: Professor
- Employer: Aalborg University
- Honours: IEEE Fellow

Remus Teodorescu (02.06.1965) is a professor of Energy Technology at Aalborg University. He holds a degree from 1989 in electrical engineering from the Politehnica University of Bucharest in Romania. In 1994 he received a Ph.D. degree in power electronics from the University of Galati in Romania.

== Career ==
In 1998 Remus Teodorescu was employed by Aalborg University, where he later became a professor. From 2005 to 2012, he was chairman of the IEEE Danish Section PELS/IES/PES chapter, where he won the Best 2009 IEEE PELS chapter. From 2009 to 2012, he was an associate editor of IEEE Transactions in power electronics. Since 2012 he has been IEEE/PELS Fellow. Between 2013 and 2017, he was visiting professor at Chalmers University of Technology in Gothenburg. From 2014 to 2015, he was an external reviewer for governmental research programs around the world and a TRI member of Nordic Energy Research, a Top-level Research Initiative. In 2016, he was conferred Dr. HC from Transilvania University of Brasov in Romania. Besides, he is the founder and current coordinator of the MMC laboratory at Aalborg University. From 2008 to 2013, he was also coordinator for a Vestas Power Program that included 10 Ph.D. projects. In 2013 Teodorescu received 7,26m DKK from The Danish Council for Strategic Research to research for a better understanding of Lithium Sulfur batteries in the whole service life. Moreover, he has been a scientific leader in a project regarding the battery system of windmills. The project is a cooperation between AAU, Ørsted and ABB's Corporate Research Center in Sweden. It is financed by Innovation Fund Denmark. In 2021 he received 28,5m DKK from the Villum Fund for Investigator Project: Smart Battery, to develop future battery technology with extended life managed by artificial intelligence.

== Awards ==
- ISI "Highly Cited Researcher" by Thomson Reuters/Clarivate, 2012–2019
- Dr. Honoris Causa by University Transilvania of Brasov, 2016
- Premium Award for Best paper in IET Renewable Power Generation, 2015
- IEEE Fellow, 2012
- Innovation Award (100.000 DKK) - Nordjysk University Found, 2011
- Best 2009 IEEE PELS chapter as chair of Danish IEEE IAS/PELS/IES Chapter

== Publications ==
Remus Teodorescu has published over 500 publications and he is cited many times.

=== Selected books ===
- "Grid Converters for Photovoltaics and Wind Power Systems" – ISBN 9780470057513, Wiley & IEEE Press, 2011
- "Design, Control and Application of Modular Multilevel Converters for HVDC Transmission Systems," ISBN 978-1-118-85156-2, Wiley-IEEE Press, Oct. 2016
