= Lough Derg, County Donegal =

Lake in Ireland

Lough Derg
- Loch Dearg (Irish)
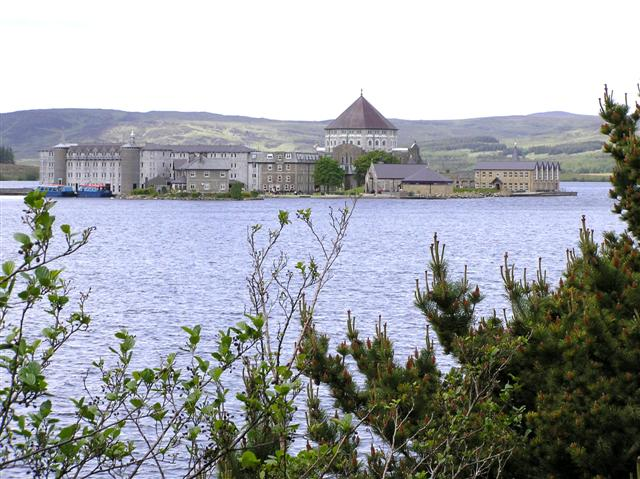
- Station Island

- Location in Ireland
- Location: County Donegal, Ireland
- Coordinates: 54°36′50″N 7°52′20″W
- Catchment area: 35.14 km^{2} (13.6 sq mi)
- Basin countries: Republic of Ireland, Northern Ireland
- Surface area: 8.81 km^{2} (3.40 sq mi)
- Surface elevation: 140 m (460 ft)
- Islands: Station Island

Lough Derg or Loch Derg (Irish: Loch Dearg) is a lake in County Donegal, Republic of Ireland. It is near the border with Northern Ireland and lies about 7 kilometres (4.3 mi) north of the border village of Pettigo. It is best known for St Patrick's Purgatory, a site of pilgrimage on Station Island in the lake. St. Patrick is said to have established the first Christian settlement here on Saint's Island. The pilgrimage was moved to Station Island in 1497.

The lake is about 8.9 square kilometres (3.4 square miles) in size, but is quite shallow, making it dangerous during bad weather. It has stocks of pike, perch and brown trout for angling.

== Annual pilgrimage ==
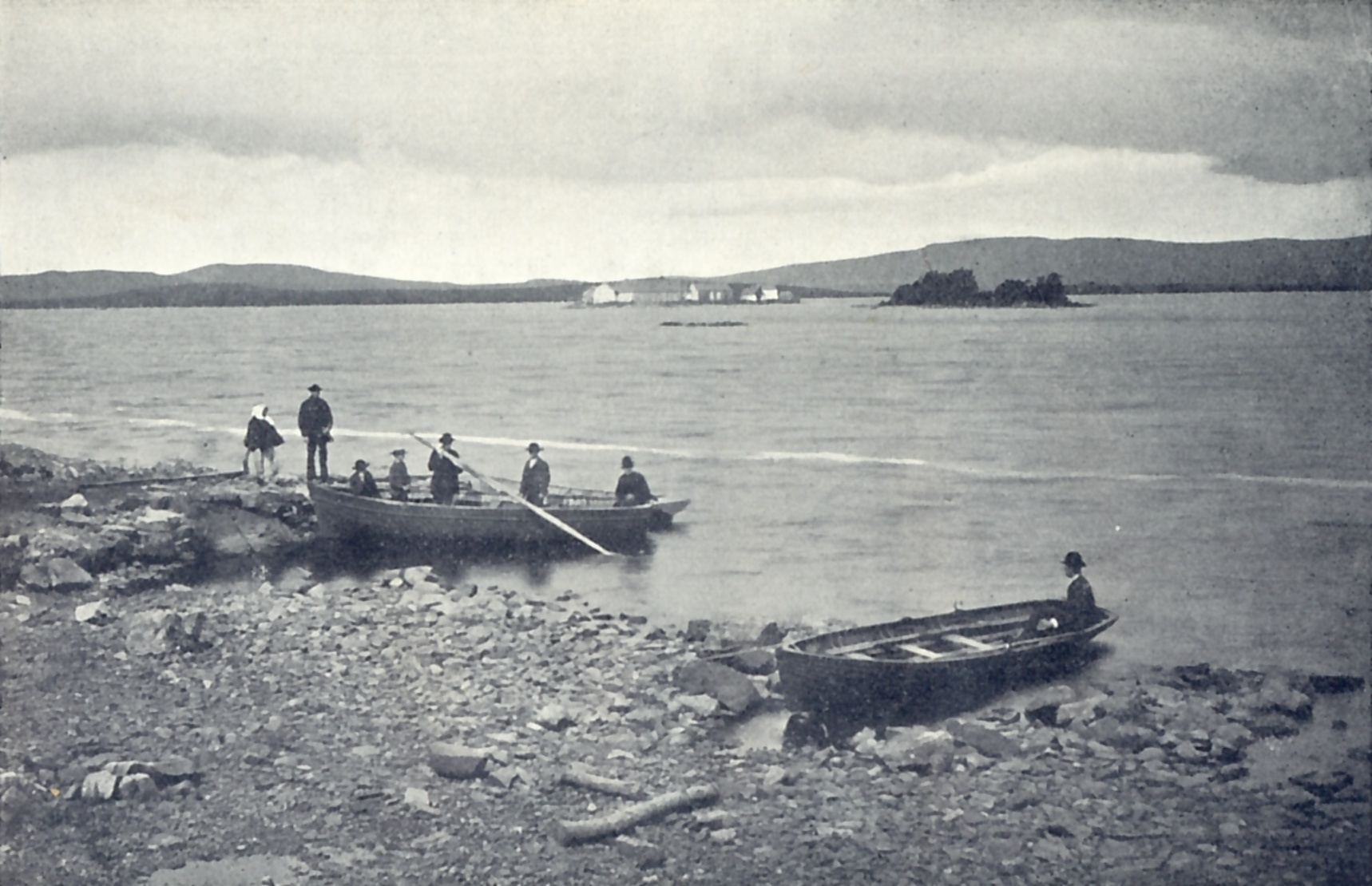
Pilgrims at Lough Derg in 1903

The traditional three-day pilgrimage follows a one-thousand-year-old pattern. It begins on any day between 1 June and 13 August and lasts three days during which participants may only have one Lough Derg meal each day (black tea/coffee, dry toast, oat cakes, water). On arrival on the island, participants remove footwear and socks before commencing vocal prayers, walking around the island. A 24-hour night vigil then takes place on the first night. Generally, pilgrims depart on the morning of the third day having slept on their second night. They complete their pilgrimage fast at midnight the day of departure. The pilgrimage is suitable for persons over 15 years. Pilgrims must be able to walk and kneel unaided and be physically able to undertake the fast.

In his 1937 travelogue The Way That I Went, Irish naturalist Robert Lloyd Praeger described the island and surrounds:

...today St Patrick's Purgatory is a loadstone attracting thousands of pilgrims between 1st June and 15th August. The penitential exercises which they perform on Station Island during the three to six days of their stay are of a very severe nature, and a test of both devotion and endurance. The situation of the place is striking. One road only, starting from Pettigoe, leads to Lough Derg. You ascend steadily; cultivation gives away to poor pasture and that to heather: and abruptly you are on the shore of a large desolate lake, surrounded by miles of peat-covered desolate hills on which no house or trace of human industry is seen: and in the middle of the lake, strangely striking and incongruous, the tall crowded ornate buildings–churches and hostels–which cover the little island.

== Islands ==
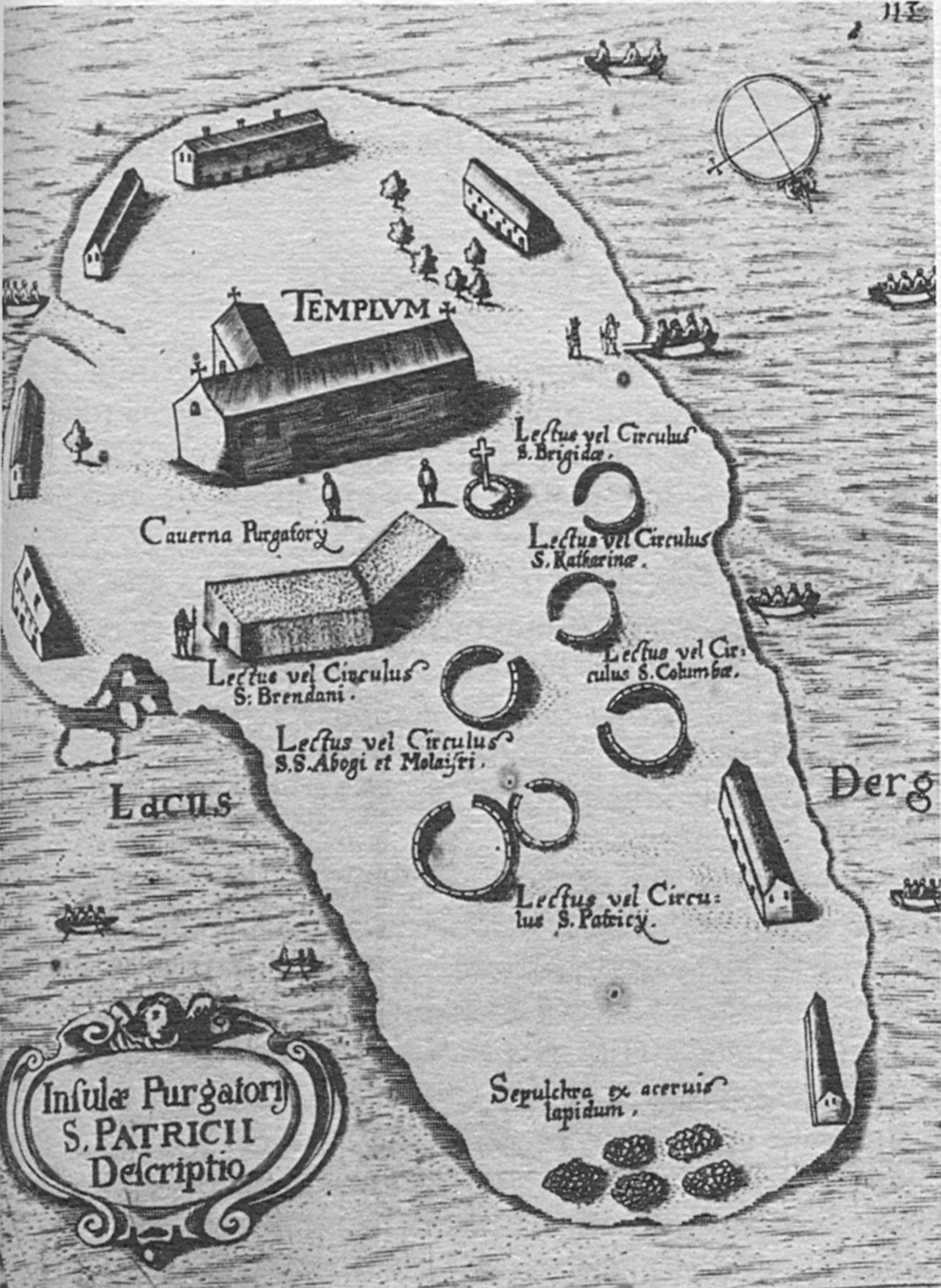
Saint Patrick's Purgatory in a map of 1666

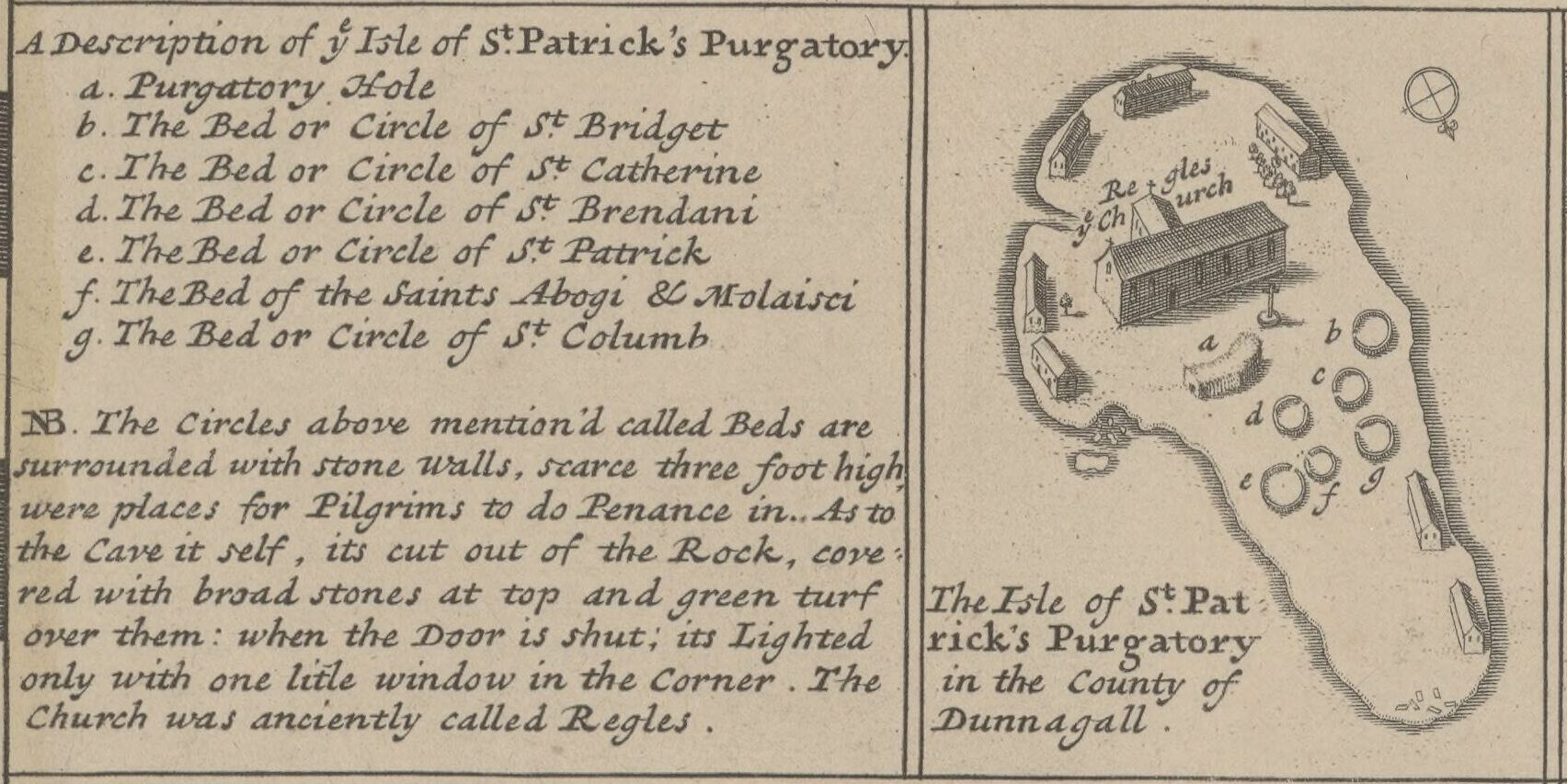
Map of the island in 1714

Including Station Island, there are about 30 islands and islets in Lough Derg, including:

- Allingham's Island
- Ash Island
- Boat Island
- Bull's Island
- Derg Beg Island
- Derg More Island
- Friar's Island
- Goose Lodge
- Gravelands Islands
- Illan Philipboy
- Inishgoosk
- Kelly's Isles
- Long Island
- Saints Island (on which there is a graveyard and the buried ruins of a monastery)
- Trough Island

== Folklore ==
According to folklore a man named Conan once threw a worm into the lake. The worm then grew into a large monster called Caoránach that devoured the local cattle. Once a majority of the cattle in Ulster died the locals blamed Conan who then enraged attacked the beast, killing it. Its blood dyed the rocks red and this is where the name Lough Derg comes from.

== See also ==
- List of loughs in Ireland
