= Enniskillen and Bundoran Railway =

Railway in Ireland

Overview
- Locale: South Donegal, Republic of Ireland, west Fermanagh, Northern Ireland
- Dates of operation: 1866–1896
- Successor: Great Northern Railway

Technical
- Track gauge: 5 ft 3 in (1,600 mm)

The Enniskillen and Bundoran Railway (E&BR) was an Irish gauge 5 ft 3 in (1,600 mm) railway company in north-west Ireland. It linked Bundoran and Ballyshannon on the coast of County Donegal with the Londonderry and Enniskillen Railway (L&ER) at Bundoran Junction in County Fermanagh. The line was opened in 1868 and closed in 1957.

== Development ==
Enniskillen and Bundoran Railway Act 1861
- Act of Parliament
- Parliament of the United Kingdom
- Long title: An Act for making a Railway from the Londonderry and Enniskillen Railway in the County of Tyrone to the Town of Bundoran in the County of Donegal, and for other Purposes.
- Citation: 24 & 25 Vict. c. cxxxviii

Dates
- Royal assent: 11 July 1861

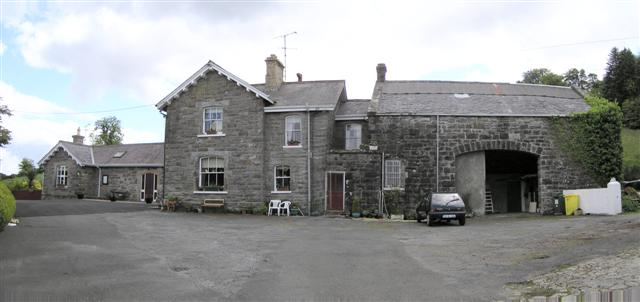
Pettigo railway station

The UK Parliament passed the Enniskillen and Bundoran Railway Act 1861 (24 & 25 Vict. c. cxxxviii) authorising a railway to link the L&ER near Enniskillen with the Midland Great Western Railway (MGW) at Sligo. Construction began in 1866 and the section between Bundoran Junction and Bundoran opened in 1868. The Irish North Western Railway (INW), which since 1866 had worked the L&ER, also provided the train service on the E&BR. The journey between Bundoran and Enniskillen was about 43 miles (69 kilometres). Bundoran Junction was triangular, giving the branch access northwards to Omagh and Derry as well as southwards to Enniskillen and Dundalk.

Enniskillen, Bundoran and Sligo Railway Act 1862
- Act of Parliament
- Parliament of the United Kingdom
- Long title: An Act to authorize the Enniskillen and Bundoran Railway Company to extend their Railway to the Midland Great Western Railway of Ireland at Sligo; to change the Name of the Company; and for other Purposes.
- Citation: 25 & 26 Vict. c. cxiv

Dates
- Royal assent: 30 June 1862

Text of statute as originally enacted

Enniskillen, Bundoran and Sligo Railway Act 1865
- Act of Parliament
- Parliament of the United Kingdom
- Long title: An Act to extend the Time for the Purchase of Lands for and Completion of the Sligo Extension of the Enniskillen, Bundoran, and Sligo Railway Company; and to enable the Company to raise further Money.
- Citation: 28 & 29 Vict. c. cxiii

Dates
- Royal assent: 19 June 1865

Enniskillen, Bundoran and Sligo Railway Act 1869
- Act of Parliament
- Parliament of the United Kingdom
- Long title: An Act for effecting an Arrangement with respect to the mortgage and other Debts of the Enniskillen, Bundoran, and Sligo Railway Company; and for other purposes.
- Citation: 32 & 33 Vict. c. xxix

Dates
- Royal assent: 24 June 1869

Text of statute as originally enacted

The E&BR was the Enniskillen, Bundoran and Sligo Railway by the Enniskillen, Bundoran and Sligo Railway Act 1862 (25 & 26 Vict. c. cxiv) in anticipation of its extension to Sligo, authorised by that act. This would have given stations on the E&BR a direct main line link with Dublin via the MGW instead of the INW's indirect and rather meandering route to Dundalk where it connected with the Dublin and Drogheda Railway’s main line to the city. A direct link to Sligo would have benefitted not only Bundoran and Ballyshannon but also the considerable pilgrim traffic to Pettigo, the nearest station for St Patrick's Purgatory on Lough Derg. It would also have enabled the E&BR to carry substantial cattle traffic from the west of Ireland to the north-east, both for domestic consumption in and around Belfast and for export to Scotland and England.

The Railway and Works by this Act authorized comprise the following, with all proper Stations, Works, and Conveniences connected therewith respectively; that is to say,
- A Railway commencing by a Junction with the authorized Line of the Enniskillen and Bundoran Railway in the Townland of Drumacrin in the Parish of Inishmacsaint in the County of Donegal, and terminating by a Junction with the Railway next herein-after described in the Townland of Cartron in the Parish of Calry in the County of Sligo:
- And a Railway (described as Railway No. 2. on the said deposited Plans) commencing by a Junction with the Railway before described in the said Townland of Cartron, and terminating by a Junction with the Sligo Extension of the Midland Great Western Railway of Ireland in the Townland of Rathedmond in the Parish of St. John's in the last-mentioned County.
— Section 8, Enniskillen, Bundoran and Sligo Railway Act 1862 (25 & 26 Vict. c. cxiv)

Enniskillen, Bundoran, and Sligo Railway Amendment Act 1878
- Act of Parliament
- Parliament of the United Kingdom
- Long title: An Act to provide for the cancelling of the Bond entered into under the Enniskillen, Bundoran, and Sligo Railway Act, 1862.
- Citation: 41 & 42 Vict. c. cc

Dates
- Royal assent: 22 July 1878

Other legislation
- Relates to: Enniskillen, Bundoran, and Sligo Railway Act 1862

Text of statute as originally enacted

Enniskillen, Bundoran, and Sligo Railway (Donegal Extension) and Enniskillen and Bundoran Extension Railway (Abandonment) Act 1879
- Act of Parliament
- Parliament of the United Kingdom
- Long title: An Act for making a Railway from the Enniskillen and Bundoran Railway at or near the Castlecaldwell Station to the town of Donegal, to be called "The Fermanagh and Donegal Railway," and other works; and for other purposes.
- Citation: 42 & 43 Vict. c. ccxxiv

Dates
- Royal assent: 15 August 1879

Text of statute as originally enacted

Enniskillen, Bundoran and Sligo Railway (Donegal Extension) Act 1888
- Act of Parliament
- Parliament of the United Kingdom
- Long title: An Act to authorise the repayment of the moneys deposited in respect of the railways authorised to be constructed by the Enniskillen, Bundoran and Sligo Railway (Donegal Extension), and Enniskillen and Bundoran Extension Railway (Abandonment) Act, 1879, and for other purposes.
- Citation: 51 & 52 Vict. c. cxxviii

Dates
- Royal assent: 24 July 1888

Other legislation
- Relates to: Enniskillen, Bundoran, and Sligo Railway (Donegal Extension) and Enniskillen and Bundoran Extension Railway (Abandonment) Act 1879

Text of statute as originally enacted

However, construction of the section from Bundoran to Sligo was delayed, and in 1875 Parliament authorised a rival project, the Sligo, Leitrim and Northern Counties Railway (SL&NCR), which took an inland route from Enniskillen via Manorhamilton to Collooney Junction on the MGWR line about 5 miles (8 kilometres) south of Sligo. In 1878 the E&BR obtained an act of Parliament, the Enniskillen, Bundoran, and Sligo Railway Amendment Act 1878 (41 & 42 Vict. c. cc) allowing it to abandon its extension to Sligo, and the SL&NCR opened in phases between 1879 and 1883.

The SL&NCR adopted as its company seal a picture of two steam locomotives colliding, with one derailed and the other remaining on the track. This commemorated the SL&NCR's success in reaching Sligo and the E&BR's failure to do the same. The SL&NCR route attracted the cattle traffic to the east coast but it was too circuitous to carry much of the passenger traffic to Bundoran, Ballyshannon or Lough Derg. This was to the permanent disadvantage of both the SL&NCR and the E&BR.

== Under the Great Northern Railway ==
In 1876 the INW merged with the Northern Railway of Ireland and the Ulster Railway to form the Great Northern Railway (GNR), which continued the INW's undertaking to work the E&BR. The GNR absorbed the E&BR in 1896, having been authorised to do so by the Great Northern Railway (Ireland) Act 1892 (55 & 56 Vict. c. clii). At first the GNR did not operate through trains between Bundoran and Dublin. However, by 1916 the GNR ran the Great Northern Hotel at Bundoran and was running through coaches that were attached a main line train between Dublin and Dundalk and to an INW line train between Dundalk and Enniskillen.

The partition of Ireland in 1922 turned the boundary between counties Donegal and Fermanagh into an international frontier. This imposed three border crossings on the E&B line: one each side of Pettigo and a third just west of Belleek. It also placed a border crossing on the road between Pettigo and the pilgrims’ destination of Lough Derg. Partition also imposed a border crossing on the SL&NCR — a fate that would not have befallen the E&BR's proposed line between Bundoran and Sligo if it had been built.

Stops for customs examinations delayed trains for unpredictable lengths of time, which added to the E&B line's existing disadvantage of circuitous connections to the centres of trade and population on Ireland's east coast. Growing road transport was able to take more direct routes with which GNR trains found it increasingly difficult to compete.

The E&B line had five intermediate stations between Bundoran Junction and Bundoran. In Fermanagh the GNR added four railmotor halts to the line and in 1934 it introduced a railcar to serve all stations between Enniskillen and Bundoran, including the railmotor halts. The railcar was a great success, covering between eight and 12 miles per gallon of fuel and costing only 4d per mile to run — far less than an equivalent steam train.

During The Emergency the GNR introduced the seasonal Bundoran Express, one of Ireland's relatively few named trains. It was not a fast train but it was a through service via Dundalk between Dublin Amiens Street station and Bundoran. The train ran non-stop between Clones and Pettigo, which allowed it to pass through Northern Ireland without stopping for customs checks.

The Second World War created new traffic for the GNR in Northern Ireland. Fuel rationing in the UK impeded road competition in Northern Ireland from 1939, and was further tightened from 1942. Many passengers and GNR staff exploited shortages and rationing of commodities in the UK by smuggling goods across the border from the Republic into the UK. On one occasion in July 1942, when the 17:00 departure from Bundoran to Belfast reached the border it was detained so long while customs officers searched its passengers that it was 04:00 the next morning that it reached Belfast Great Victoria Street.

After the war the GNR's fortunes declined again. In 1953 the governments of Northern Ireland and the Republic jointly nationalised the ailing company as the GNR Board.

== Nationalisation and closure ==
In 1957 the Northern Ireland Government made the GNR Board close all its lines across or near the border except the Dublin – Belfast main line and its branch to Newry. Lines including the Enniskillen and Bundoran, the Dundalk and Enniskillen and the Omagh – Enniskillen section of the Londonderry and Enniskillen were closed on 1 October 1957. Closure of these lines and the Northern Ireland government's withdrawal of grant aid gave the SL&NCR no option but to close as well.

The closures conceded holiday traffic to Bundoran and Ballyshannon to road competition, but the railway strove to retain pilgrim traffic to Lough Derg. The Bundoran Express was replaced by a service from Dublin via Portadown and the Portadown, Dungannon and Omagh Junction Railway (PD&O) to Omagh in Northern Ireland, which then became the railhead for Lough Derg. In 1958 the Irish Republic and Northern Ireland dissolved the GNR Board and divided its assets between Córas Iompair Éireann (CIÉ) and the Ulster Transport Authority (UTA). However, CIÉ continued the pilgrim service to Omagh until 1964. In February 1965 the UTA closed the PD&O as recommended by the Benson Report of 1963.
