= Alan Kane (Gaelic footballer) =

Irish Gaelic footballer (1945–2021)

Personal information
- Native name: Ailéin Ó Catháin (Irish)
- Born: 1945 Ballyshannon, County Donegal, Ireland
- Died: 16 March 2021 (aged 75) Ballyshannon, County Donegal, Ireland
- Occupation: Mechanic

Sport
- Sport: Gaelic football
- Position: Goalkeeper
Clubs
- Years: Club
- St Joseph's; Aodh Ruadh
Club titles
- Donegal titles: 7
- Ulster titles: 1
Inter-county
- Years: County
- Donegal
Inter-county titles
- Ulster titles: 2
- All-Irelands: 0
- NFL: 0
- All Stars: 0

John A. D. Kane (1945 – 16 March 2021), known as Alan Kane, was an Irish Gaelic footballer who played as goalkeeper for the St Joseph's and Aodh Ruadh clubs and for the Donegal county team in the early 1970s.

== Playing career ==
Born in Ballyshannon, Kane first came to prominence as a Gaelic footballer with the Ballyshannon-Bundoran combination of St Joseph's. At club level he won seven County Senior Championship titles in nine seasons between 1968 and 1976, while he also lined out in goal when St Joseph's became the first Donegal club to win the Ulster Club Championship.

At inter-county level, Kane made his championship debut against Antrim in 1970. He was between the posts when Donegal claimed their inaugural Ulster Championship in 1972. He was a substitute when the title was secured for a second time in 1974.

== Post-playing career ==
At his death, Kane was vice-president of the Aodh Ruadh club. The club also credited him with "resurrecting" the sport of camogie during the 1980s and inducted him into the Aodh Ruadh Hall of Fame in 2012. He was part of the management team that won the 1995 Donegal Senior Ladies' Football Championship, having been a founding member of the sport at the club in 1992.

== Personal life ==
Kane was married to Patricia, with whom he had three daughters (Fiona, Frances and Grainne) and one son (Pauric).

Kane died on 16 March 2021, aged 75. He was survived by his wife, three daughters, one son and two brothers, Teddy and Jim.

== Honours ==
St Joseph's

- Ulster Senior Club Football Championship: 1975
- Donegal Senior Football Championship: 1968, 1970, 1971, 1973, 1974, 1975, 1976

Donegal

- Ulster Senior Football Championship: 1972, 1974
