= John Duffy (Gaelic footballer) =

Irish Gaelic footballer

Personal information
- Native name: Seán Ó Dufaigh (Irish)
- Occupation: Physical therapist

Sport
- Sport: Gaelic football
- Position: Forward
Clubs
- Years: Club
- 19??–? 1991: Aodh Ruadh; Tír Chonaill Gaels
Club titles
- Donegal titles: 3
Inter-county
- Years: County
- 1993–1999: Donegal

John Duffy is an Irish former Gaelic footballer who played for Aodh Ruadh and the Donegal county team.

His position was forward. He twice contested the final of the Ulster Senior Football Championship, in 1993 and 1998, but never won the competition as a player. He is a resident of Killygordon.

== Playing career ==
=== Club ===
P. J. Buggy and Josie Boyle mentored Duffy. The Irish Times later described him as "improviser-in-chief [from age 12] on an Aodh Ruadh team that dominated at all grades through to senior." In Autumn 1994, Duffy scored five points as Aodh Ruadh defeated reigning Ulster club champions Errigal Ciaran, featuring Peter Canavan. Eventual All-Ireland finalists Bellaghy defeated them by a point in the following match. Duffy is also remembered for chipping goalkeeper Tony Blake with a penalty in the final of the 1999 Donegal Senior Football Championship.

He won three Donegal Senior Football Championships, in 1994, 1997 and 1998.

=== Inter-county ===
Duffy played at minor level for two years and played at under-21 level for four years. He spent the summer of 1991 abroad, playing with Tir Chonaill Gaels and the London senior county team. Brian McEniff drafted him into his team following the 1992 All-Ireland win. Duffy scored 1–2 on his full debut, a substitute appearance against Armagh in that season's Ulster Championship. He played 49 times for his county between 1993 and 1999, losing two Ulster finals (in 1993 and 1998), as well as two league finals. He played for Civil Service GAA club as well. He featured in Donegal's top 125 footballers in the 125-year history of the Gaelic Athletic Association in a poll carried out by the Donegal Democrat in 2009.

After his playing career with Donegal, he went to Australia "for a couple of years". After serving as assistant manager/coach of Aodh Ruadh in 2007, Duffy served as a selector and maor foirne (runner) under former Donegal teammate Jim McGuinness, as the county senior team progressed to the 2014 All-Ireland final.

== Personal life ==
Duffy works as a physical therapist in Killygordon and stood unsuccessfully for the Green Party in Donegal South-West at the 2011 general election. He has three children with his wife. Kennedy has coached futsal, managed the Donegal Schoolboys Kennedy Cup team in 2021 and, — with Nikki Galvin — was appointed joint manager of the Killygordon-based Curragh Athletic soccer club in May 2022, succeeding Niall Fitzsimons.
