= 1975–76 All-Ireland Senior Club Football Championship =

- Teams: 33
- Champions: St. Vincent's (1st title)
- Runners-up: Roscommon Gaels

The 1975–76 All-Ireland Senior Club Football Championship was the sixth staging of the All-Ireland Senior Club Football Championship since its establishment by the Gaelic Athletic Association in 1970-71.

University College Dublin were the defending champions, however, they failed to qualify after conceding a walkover to St Vincent's in the Dublin County Championship.

On 14 March 1976, St Vincent's won the championship following a 4-10 to 0-5 defeat of Roscommon Gaels in the All-Ireland final at O'Moore Park. It was their first ever championship title.

== Munster ==
=== First round ===
26 October 1975 First round	Dunhill	1-08 - 4-07	Austin Stacks	Fraher Field
	J Cullinane 1-1, S O'Brien 0-2, R Cullinane 0-1, R Power 0-1, J Murphy 0-1, T Moore 0-1, T Casey 0-1.		M Sheehy 2-2, G Power 1-1, B Curtin 1-0, D Long 0-3, JJ Barrett 0-1.

2 November 1975 First round	Kilrush Shamrocks	3-07 - 2-04	Treaty Sarsfields	The Cricket Field

=== Semi-finals ===
1 November 1975 Semi-final	Nemo Rangers	7-15 - 0-03	Kilruane MacDonaghs	Trabeg Sportsfield
	D Buckley 2-2, D Allen 2-1, C Murphy 1-2, L Barrett 1-2, L Good 1-1, N Morgan 0-4, S Coughlan 0-2, D Linehan 0-1.		J Williams 0-2, P Reddan 0-1.

30 November 1975 Semi-final	Kilrush Shamrocks	0-11 - 1-09	Austin Stacks	The Cricket Field
	S Moloney 0-3, J O'Halloran 0-3, B O'Reilly 0-2, T Prendeville 0-2, J Hehir 0-1.		M Sheehy 0-4, B Curtin 1-0, J Power 0-2, T Kennington 0-1, D Long 0-1, F Dillon 0-1.

=== Final ===
14 December 1975 Final	Nemo Rangers	2-07 - 2-07	Austin Stacks	Gaelic Grounds
	D Allen 1-4, J Barrett 1-1, K Collins 0-1, C Murphy 0-1.		M Sheehy 1-3, JJ Barrett 1-0, J Power 0-2, T Kennington 0-1, B Curtin 0-1.

21 December 1975 Final replay	Nemo Rangers	1-09 - 2-06	Austin Stacks	Gaelic Grounds
	D Allen 0-6, S Coughlan 1-0, C Murphy 0-2, K Collins 0-1.		M Sheehy 2-3, T Sheehan 0-1, D Long 0-1, G Power 0-1.

18 January 1976 Second final replay	Nemo Rangers	1-09 - 0-10	Austin Stacks	Gaelic Grounds
	L Good 1-0, K Collins 0-3, J Barrett 0-3, D Allen 0-1, S Coughlan 0-1, C Murphy 0-1.		M Sheehy 0-8, T Kennington 0-1, P Moriarty 0-1.

== Quarter-final ==
8 February 1976 Quarter-final	Roscommon Gaels	1-07 - 0-08	Seán McDermotts	Dr Hyde Park

== Semi-finals ==
22 February 1976 Semi-final	St Joseph's	0-03 - 1-07	Roscommon Gaels	Fr Tierney Park

22 February 1976 Semi-final	Nemo Rangers	0-03 - 0-10	St Vincent's	The Mardyke

== Final ==
14 March 1976 Final	St Vincent's	4-10 - 0-05	Roscommon Gaels	O'Moore Park

== Statistics ==
=== Miscellaneous ===
- St Joseph's won the Ulster Club Championship for the only time in their history. They were also the first team from Donegal to win the provincial title.
- Roscommon Gaels became the first team to win back-to-back Connacht Club Championship titles.
- Nemo Rangers became the first team to win back-to-back Munster Club Championship titles.
