= Brendan Devenney =

Donegal Gaelic footballer

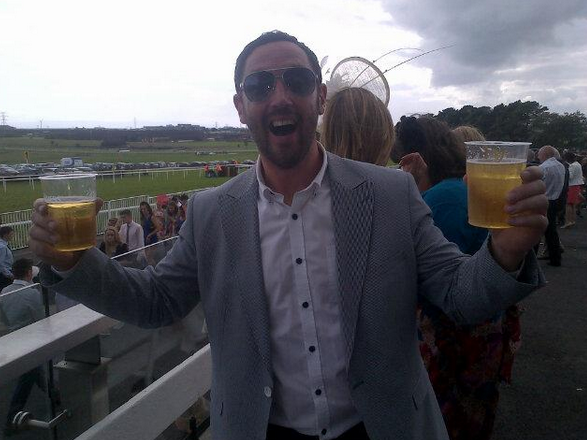

Personal information
- Native name: Breandán Ó Duibheannaigh (Irish)
- Nickname: Dev
- Born: 1976 (age 49–50) Letterkenny, County Donegal
- Height: 5 ft 11 in (180 cm)

Sport
- Sport: Gaelic football
- Position: Full-forward
Clubs
- Years: Club
- 1996–2009 Various, incl. 2002: St Eunan's; Donegal New York
Club titles
- Donegal titles: 5
Inter-county
Years	County	Apps (scores)
1998–2009	Donegal	104 (22–246)
Inter-county titles
- NFL: 1
- All Stars: 0

Brendan Devenney (born 1976) is an Irish Gaelic football coach, broadcaster and former player. He played as a forward.

Devenney played for the St Eunan's club, and also represented the Donegal county team. He contested ? Ulster Senior Football Championship (SFC) finals with Donegal, played in a semi-final of the 2003 All-Ireland Senior Football Championship, and won the 2007 National Football League title. Of a mercurial temperament, Devenney often wandered away from the sport to play association football instead. Described by RTÉ as "one of the greatest players to have worn the Donegal jersey", Devenney was his county's "main marksman in the pre-McGuinness era". He also won five Donegal Senior Football Championship (SFC) titles with his club. Devenney was a member of the Ireland team that won the 1998 and 2001 International Rules Series.

After retiring, Devenney remained involved with his local club (having co-managed them to a Donegal SFC in 2012). He appears on media platforms such as Highland Radio, and files a column for the Letterkenny Leader. He is also having to come to terms with Michael Murphy naming him on national television as his childhood hero. A shocked Devenney opened up on this revelation years later: "And that was back when Michael was already the fuckin' man! The fact that he has called me his hero is, probably, the most humbling thing that anyone has ever said to me". Devenney later said: "Has anyone's hero turned around and then been their hero? Because Michael would be mine. So it's come full circle".

== Playing career ==
Devenney played for his school team, St Eunan's College.

=== Club ===
In the final of the 1999 Donegal Senior Football Championship, Devenney broke Martin McHugh's record by scoring 0–14 of his team's 1–19 to their opponents Aodh Ruadh's 1–11. Devenney punctured a lung while playing for his club against Clonoe of Tyrone in the Ulster Club SFC in 2008. He ignored his injury, sustained in the first half, and carried on until the end of the game—scoring four points and contributing to the decisive goal which won the game for his team—after which he was hospitalised. He also captained his club.

He won five Donegal SFCs as a player.

He also played for Donegal New York.

=== County ===
Devenney played senior football for Donegal despite not having played underage. His debut against Cork in the National Football League quarter-final at Croke Park in March 1998 was nothing short of sensational: he scored 2–2. Declan Bonner gave Devenney his championship debut in 1998. He played in his first Ulster Senior Football Championship final later that year, and though he lost, he received the man of the match award.

He often partnered Adrian Sweeney in Donegal's forward line.

He played in the 2003 All-Ireland Senior Football Championship semi-final against Armagh, scoring three points (all of which were frees).

Devenney had a decent game against Armagh in the 2004 Ulster final at Croke Park. He played championship football until 2005. He came back in 2007. That year, Devenney contributed to the county winning its first National Football League title in 2007, passing a late fitness test to play in the final against Mayo. However, he went off injured during the game, which Donegal won, and Kevin McMenamin replaced him. He made a substitute appearance against Armagh in the 2007 Ulster SFC quarter-final at MacCumhaill Park on 27 May that year and scored the last-minute goal which defeated the Orchard County by a single point on a scoreline of 1–9 to 1–8. However, he was excluded from the squad in 2008. He confirmed his retirement from football's top level on 29 December 2009.

Devenney never won the Ulster Senior Football Championship during his career. Shortly after his departure Donegal won an All-Ireland Senior Football title in 2012. Devenney said,

I try not to look back. I try to blank it [the past] out. Because there are too many regrets. It hurts too much. There were good days and good bits, for sure, but the big things like an Ulster and All-Ireland that you were looking for, you never got to and that's why I'm afraid to look back. As I've grown older I'd be wild angry about it. We'd be knocked out of Ulster for playing conventional football, then out of Ulster we could play conventional football as good as anyone. We'd be in the qualifiers and tear through the Longfords and Tipperarys, beat the likes of Meath and Galway. They were the games that sustained you, that's why we played football. But see going up to Clones? I'd be dreading going in the door. There were times I'd be thinking, 'What am I doing here?' That was my mindset before a championship match. I didn't want to be there. How the hell was I going to perform? Looking back on it, there was no way it could go right. Because Armagh and Tyrone had us figured out. They'd lock down space. You look at Bernard and Alan Brogan against Dublin in that [All-Ireland] semi-final a couple of years ago. They looked like they wanted to walk off the pitch. Donegal messed with their heads. Bernard was in there on his own. He couldn't make a channel run. When he did get it, right away he was running into three boys. That was me for years.

He spoke again in 2020 of the "dread" he experienced ahead of playing for Donegal against other Ulster teams.

=== National team ===
Devenney represented Ireland in the 1998 International Rules Series. He scored one over (worth three points) in the second test, which was held at Croke Park on 18 October, as Ireland won the series by an aggregate score of 128–118. He was his country's leading scorer against Australia in the 2001 International Rules Series, as Ireland romped to victory in Australia. He scored four overs in the first test, held at the Melbourne Cricket Ground on 12 October, as Ireland won 59–53. He scored two overs in the second test, held at Football Park in Adelaide on 19 October.

== Association football ==
While playing for Donegal, Devenney would often pass the time during the 2000s by playing association football matches for League of Ireland club Finn Harps. He was involved in the 2001–02 League of Ireland Premier Division relegation playoff penalty shoot-out loss to Longford Town after Finn Harps qualified via the 2001–02 League of Ireland First Division.

In 2006, he became disillusioned and began playing association football in the Irish League with Portadown.

There was also Limavady United somewhere.

Devenney, however, was not sufficiently interested in the sport to take up an offer of a two-year contract with Finn Harps in 2007, preferring to play football for Donegal.

Devenney has also played for association football club Gweedore United in the Donegal Junior Football League.

== Coaching and media work ==
As of 2012, Devenney was coaching his local club and doing radio commentary for the BBC. He was critical of the qualifiers the GAA brought into the All-Ireland Senior Football Championship, saying in 2009 that they had "diluted the Championship season a bit." He was also involved in a national radio debate hosted by Marian Finucane on the topic of money. He predicted Derry would beat Donegal in the 2014 Ulster Senior Football Championship quarter-final.

=== DL Debate ===
On 10 February 2020, a weekly programme called DL Debate began airing on Highland Radio. It originated in discussion between Devenney and Oisín Kelly between games on a Sunday, with Devenney concluding that a Monday evening programme to discuss the weekend's fixtures was necessary. Devenney's guests on the first episode included John Haran, Colm Parkinson (Laois) and Ciarán Whelan (Dublin). Others in later episodes included Neil Gallagher, John Gildea, Enda McGinley (Tyrone), Rory Kavanagh, Donal Reid, Bernard Flynn (Meath), P. J. McGowan and David Brady (Mayo). Devenney presented DL Debate live from Donegal Town on the evening of the homecoming after the 2025 All-Ireland Senior Football Championship final.

== Personal life ==
He is the son of Paddy and Imelda Devenney. His father died of an illness in September 2022, while his sister Margaret also died — suddenly — the next day, and the two were given a joint funeral.

=== Charairy balls ===
"DV's Charity Ball", as it was termed, was held in November 2021 at Letterkenny's Mount Errigal Hotel. €24,000 was collected for Cancer Care West, Focus Ireland and Plan International Ireland.

According to Devenney, 2018 was when he first became involved with Plan International. Fasting has been part of his involvement with the charity. In June 2023, Devenney went to Togo to see what was happening with his funds for Plan International.

Another of Devenney's balls was held at Letterkenny's Mount Errigal Hotel on 24 November 2023. Devenney said his second ball would involve a drinks reception, four-course meal, an auction and music. Donegal Hospice, Epilepsy Ireland and Plan International were the charities targeted on this occasion. Devenney linked his second ball to the memory of his father and sister, who had both died since he held his first ball.

== Honours ==
Club

- Donegal Senior Football Championship: 1999, 2001, 2007, 2008, 2009

County

- National Football League: 2007

Country

- International Rules Series: 1998, 2001

Individual

- Ulster Senior Football Championship final man of the match: 1998
- All Star nomination: 2001
