= Leslie McGettigan =

Irish Gaelic footballer

Personal information
- Native name: Leaschulainn Mac Eiteagáin (Irish)

Sport
- Sport: Gaelic football
Club
- Years: Club
- St Eunan's
Inter-county
- Years: County
- 198?–19??: Donegal

Leslie McGettigan (born c. 1960?) is a Gaelic football manager and former player for St Eunan's and Donegal.

McGettigan was born to footballer James "Gouldie" McGettigan and his wife Cora (née Embleton). He was one of four daughters and seven sons (including fellow Donegal footballer Paul). One of McGettigan's brothers died at the age of sixteen in 1986 and another at the age of forty in 2009.

He attended boarding school at St Jarlath's College in Tuam, where he played in three consecutive Hogan Cup finals, the first aged 15 making him the youngest in history. He won the Hogan Cup in 1984.

McGettigan won the 1987 All-Ireland Under-21 Football Championship. In 1988, he played a critical role in the county's victory against Laois, which led to the county's first promotion to Division One of the National Football League.

His club defeated Aodh Ruadh in the final of the 1997 Donegal Senior Football Championship by a scoreline of 1–11 to 2–7 but lost the title when McGettigan was found to have participated in two separate championships in the same year. Croke Park delayed its ruling until the following year, at which time the Games Administration Committee (GAC) banned McGettigan for 12 months.

He lives in New York. He has managed the New York county football team. He is a family friend of John Haran.
