= CLG Réalt na Mara =

Donegal-based Gaelic games club

Bundoran GAA
- CLG Réalt na Mara
- Founded: 1916
- County: Donegal
- Colours: Amber and Black
- Coordinates: 54°57′08.48″N 8°21′07.55″W

Playing kits
Standard colours

Senior Club Championships
	All Ireland	Ulster champions	Donegal champions
Football:	-	-	3

CLG Réalt na Mara, or, in the English language, Star of the Sea GAA, is a Gaelic football-only GAA club based in Bundoran, County Donegal, Ireland. The club fields both men's and ladies' teams at underage and, as far as, senior level.

As of 2022, Brian McEniff remained chairman of the club.

The club has a local rivalry with Aodh Ruadh, based in nearby Ballyshannon.

== History ==
In the 1920s, the location of Bundoran on the railway line made the Bundoran local ground a convenient venue for many big games. The GAA club grounds were purchased in 1938. The club was reorganised and renamed 'The Star of the Sea'. The football park has undergone many developments throughout the years. The ground was levelled in 1947 and enclosed in 1951. The club changing rooms were constructed in 1972.

The juniors were successful in both the 1956 and 1960 Championships. In 1963, "Star of the Sea" joined with Ballyshannon team, Aodh Ruadh to become St Joseph's. That team included many players that contributed to the Donegal county team, including Brian McEniff and the former Donegal County Council Manager Michael McLoone. In 1977, the club was again divided into two clubs, one each for the towns of Bundoran and Ballyshannon.

Bundoran won the first ever Donegal senior championship title when they defeated Red Hughs of Killygordon in a replayed final in the Brandywell in Derry. It was in fact the 1919 championship but a series of delays ensured the replay was in March 1920. The club were again senior champions in 1934 and along with Ballyshannon, were part of the phenomenally successful St Josephs side that dominated Donegal club football in the late 1960s and early to mid-1970s winning eight titles as well as the first, though unofficial, All-Ireland club championship in 1968 defeating Dunmore McHales in the final. St Josephs broke up in the 1976 and in 1977 Réalt na Mara went on to win the first ever Intermediate title following this up with Senior Championship success in 1979, overcoming Seán MacCumhaill's in a nail-biting one-point victory to win the Senior Championship.

Local man Brian McEniff led Donegal to their first ever Ulster title in 1972 and won managed the County to four more Ulster successes before managing Donegal to their first ever All-Ireland Senior Football Championship in 1992, in which they defeated Dublin in the final 0–18 to 0–14. Bundoran was the scene of enormous celebrations for almost a month afterwards.

In 2010, Réalt na Mara won the Donegal Intermediate Football Championship. They again won the Donegal Intermediate Football Championship in 2015 and advanced the same year to the Ulster Intermediate Club Football Championship final, where they lost to Loughinisland.

St Naul's — achieving a first win in the 2022 Donegal SFC — defeated Réalt na Mara by 0-13 to 1-6 in the play-off final at Tírconaill Park, thus relegating Réalt na Mara to the 2023 IFC.

== Notable players ==
- Jamie Brennan — 2018 and 2019 Ulster SFC winner 2024 Ulster Senior Football Championship winner
- Paul Brennan — 2018 and 2019 Ulster SFC winner
- Seamie Granaghan — played at half-forward during Donegal's 1972 and 1974 Ulster SFC title victories; father-in-law of Paul Brennan
- Brian McEniff — 1992 All-Ireland SFC winning manager

== Managers ==
Years	Manager
1916–?	—
?–2013	Joe Keeney
2013–201?	Brian McEniff
2016–18/19?	Francie Martin
2019	Niall Dunne
2020	Terry McCann
2021–	Cathal Corey

== Honours ==
- Donegal Senior Football Championship: 1919, 1934, 1979
- Donegal Intermediate Football Championship: 1977, 2010, 2015
- Ulster Intermediate Club Football Championship runner-up: 2015
