= St Joseph's GFC (Donegal) =

St Joseph's
- Naomh Iósaef
- Founded: 1963
- County: Donegal
- Grounds: Fr Tierney Park, Ballyshannon
- Coordinates: 54.497863°N 8.191321°W

Playing kits
Standard colours

Senior Club Championships
	All Ireland	Ulster champions	Donegal champions
Football:	-	1	8

St Joseph's Gaelic Football Club was a Gaelic football club in County Donegal, Ireland.

== History ==
The club was formed in 1963 from the merger of Aodh Ruadh, based in Ballyshannon, and Réalt na Mara, based in Bundoran.

Brian McEniff explained in 2013 that St Joseph's was formed when the clubs in the two towns "were doing rather poorly. In spite of the great rivalry, they came together. The bonding factor was the De La Salle College in the upper part of our parish... All of the boys — except myself, I went to a boarding school in Monaghan — were from De La Salle. It was a natural transition".

St Joseph's won an unofficial Ulster Senior Club Football Championship against St John's in Irvinestown in 1966, reached the first official final in 1968 and won the official tournament in 1975; they remained the only Donegal club to do so until 2018 when Gaoth Dobhair won Ulster.

The clubs separated in 1977.

== Notable players ==
- Alan Kane — 1972 and 1974 Ulster SFC winning player
- Brian McEniff — 1992 All-Ireland SFC winning manager
- Pauric McShea — 1972 and 1974 Ulster SFC winning player

== Honours ==
- Ulster Senior Club Football Championship: 1975
- Donegal Senior Football Championship: 1965, 1968, 1970, 1971, 1973, 1974, 1975, 1976
- Donegal Senior Football League: 4
- Gold Flake Cup: 1
