= Brian Tuohy =

Irish Gaelic footballer

Brian Tuohy (born 1962) is a retired Gaelic footballer who played with and captained Donegal.

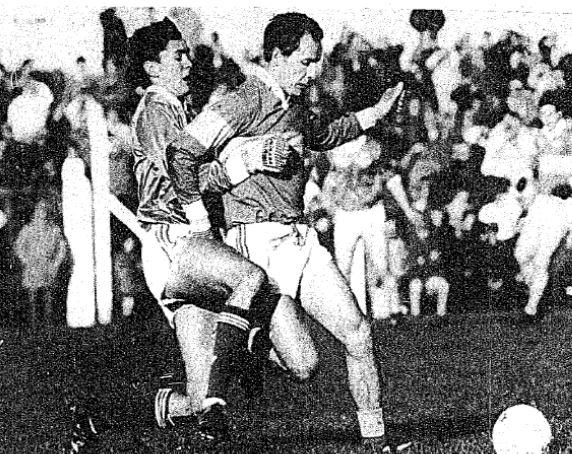
Brian Tuohy (right) of Donegal and Maurice Fitzgerald (left) of Kerry during Donegal's 1-10 to 0-11 win in the National Football League match at Austin Stack Park, Tralee on 20 November 1988

A native of Ballyshannon, Tuohy captained Donegal to an All-Ireland Under-21 Title in 1982, was involved when Donegal won Ulster Senior titles in 1983 and 1990, and was centre-back in 1988 when Donegal won promotion to Division 1 of the National League for the first time. During this time, Tuohy captained Donegal to a famous National League win over Kerry in Tralee in November 1988. He suffered several serious injuries, including a hamstring tear in 1984 followed by his pelvis then another hamstring tear in early 1992. In 1987, Tuohy captained Aodh Ruadh to their ninth Donegal Senior Football Championship.

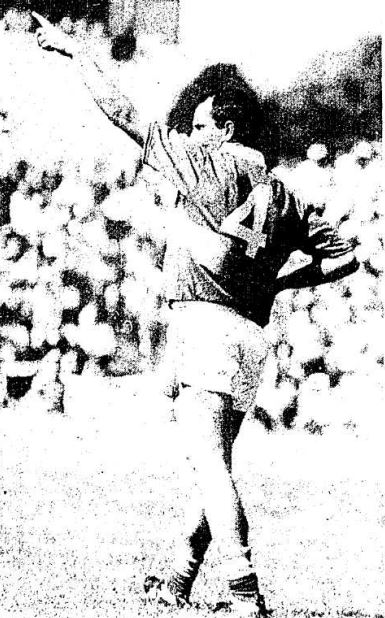
Brian Tuohy of Donegal during the Ulster Senior Football Championship final, 16 July 1989

Having just retired, Tuohy missed out on a medal when Donegal won the 1992 All-Ireland Senior Football Championship. (On Tuohy's departure, future Donegal manager Jim McGuinness joined the county panel). Tuohy later played inter-county football with Sligo. He captained Sligo in a Connacht Senior Football Championship match against London at Ruislip in 1993.

Alongside Sylvester Maguire, Tuohy later enjoyed a successful spell as joint-player-manager of his hometown club, Aodh Ruadh, in the late 1990s. In 1997, Tuohy and Maguire led Aodh Ruadh to their eleventh Donegal Senior Football Championship. The following year, Aodh Ruadh retained the Dr Maguire Cup, claiming their twelfth Donegal Senior Football Championship title.
