= Caolan Ward =

Donegal Gaelic footballer (born 1992)

Personal information
- Native name: Caolán Mac an Bháird (Irish)
- Born: 18 August 1992 (age 34)
- Occupation: Strength and conditioning coach
- Height: 6 ft 3 in (191 cm)

Sport
- Sport: Gaelic football
- Position: Back
Club
- Years: Club
- 2010–: St Eunan's
Club titles
- Donegal titles: 4
Inter-county
- Years: County
- 2016–2025: Donegal
- Ulster titles: 2

Caolan Ward (born 18 August 1992) is an Irish Gaelic footballer who plays for St Eunan's and, previously, for the Donegal county team.

When first called up for Donegal in 2016, he was based in Carlow and travelled from there to train with the team; by 2018 he had relocated to Monaghan. By 2019, he had returned home to work as a personal trainer at Donegal Strength and Conditioning Gym in a little area called Milford.

== Education ==
Ward is from Letterkenny. He attended St Eunan's College, where he played for the school team and learned to "kick the high ball in low" from team trainer Neil "Flash" Gordon. He later studied at IT Carlow and also played for their team. He would later become teacher at his former school.

Ward was a member of Letterkenny Athletic Club until his late teens, where he competed against and relayed with Mark English, before focusing on his football. Ward's father, Anthony, trained Ward at the local athletic club. Ward specialised in the long jump and was Ireland's best at under-9 level in 2001 and under-13 level in 2004.

== Playing career ==
=== Club ===
Ward made his senior debut for the St Eunan's club in 2010, in a game against Naomh Conaill.

The 2012 Donegal Senior Football Championship was his first Dr Maguire Cup win.

Ward started as his club won the 2014 Donegal Senior Football Championship title, dethroning defending champions Glenswilly in the final. He later won the 2021 Donegal Senior Football Championship title with his club, also starting the final. He then won the 2024 Donegal Senior Football Championship with his club, also starting the final.

=== Inter-county ===
Ward played for the Donegal minor team in 2011. He grew up playing at half-back, which he has said is his preferred position; however, he has been used further back in a marking role for his county. He later played for the under-21 team.

He watched the 2012 All-Ireland Senior Football Championship final from Croke Park's Upper Davin Stand.

First featuring for his county at senior level under the management of Rory Gallagher, Ward was first called up ahead of the 2016 season, the eldest of twelve new recruits and travelling from Carlow to train with the team. He appeared as a late substitute against Mayo in the 2016 National Football League at MacCumhaill Park. That one minute, as well as injury time, was his total game play for Donegal in the 2016 season.

Ward made his first league start for Donegal against Kerry in the opening fixture of the 2017 at O'Donnell Park (his club's home ground), completing the full match.

He made his championship debut against Antrim in the quarter-final of the 2017 Ulster Senior Football Championship. By contrast, Patrick McBrearty (who is slightly younger than Ward) had reached a century of appearances for Donegal by the time Ward started an All-Ireland quarter-final in 2019. He started the 2017 All-Ireland Senior Football Championship qualifier defeat of Meath at Páirc Tailteann. He then started the qualifier loss to Galway at Markievicz Park.

Ward continued to feature for his county under the management of Declan Bonner. He made a second half substitute appearance against Fermanagh in the final of the 2018 Ulster Senior Football Championship, claiming his first Ulster senior title. He had earlier started, and scored a point in, the preliminary round defeat of Cavan. He started the quarter-final defeat of Derry. He also started, and scored a point in, the semi-final defeat of Down.

Ward appeared in the four 2019 Dr McKenna Cup matches that Donegal played. He then began Donegal's first six matches in the 2019 National Football League when others were out injured, before losing his place in the team when they returned. He made a late appearance against Cavan in the final of the 2019 Ulster Senior Football Championship, claiming his second title. He made another late appearance against Meath in the following game. Then he got to play at Croke Park in the 2019 All-Ireland quarter-final match against Kerry when the likes of Neil McGee and Eoghan Bán Gallagher were injured, leaving Donegal lacking their first-choice back line. He spent much of the game competing against Paul Geaney.

He scored a goal against Monaghan in the 2020 National Football League on 1 March. However, the COVID-19 pandemic then brought all competition to a halt and, upon resumption in October, Ward's only part in the first game back (against Tyrone) was as a late substitute. He started the final league game, away to Kerry. He did not feature during the 2020 Ulster Senior Football Championship.

Ward started the first of Donegal's four fixtures of the 2021 National Football League, against Tyrone, before making substitute appearances in the third and fourth games, against Armagh and Dublin respectively, scoring a point against Armagh. He did not feature during the 2021 Ulster Senior Football Championship.

Ward played every minute of the 2022 National Football League, against (respectively) Mayo, Kildare, Kerry, Tyrone, Monaghan, Dublin and Armagh. He scored a point in the final game against Armagh. After four rounds of fixtures, the Donegal News described Ward as being "in firm possession of a starting jersey". In the 2022 Ulster Senior Football Championship, Ward played every minute of Donegal's three fixtures, the quarter-final against Armagh, the semi-final against Cavan and the final against Derry (which included extra-time). He also started the 2022 All-Ireland Senior Football Championship qualifier loss to Armagh, though — with his team trailing — was substituted for forward Conor O'Donnell late in the game.

He injured his hamstring during the 2024 season, before playing the 2025 National Football League game against Mayo. He announced his retirement from inter-county football in December 2025.

== Honours ==
Donegal

- Ulster Senior Football Championship: 2018, 2019
- Dr McKenna Cup: 2018

St Eunan's

- Donegal Senior Football Championship: 2012, 2014, 2021, 2024
- Gradam Shéamuis Mhic Géidigh: 2021
