= Paul McGettigan =

Irish Gaelic footballer, manager, and barrister

Personal information
- Native name: Pól Mac Eiteagáin (Irish)
- Born: 1957 or 1958 (age 68–69)
- Occupation: Barrister

Sport
- Sport: Gaelic football
Clubs
- Years: Club
- St Eunan's; Salthill; St Grellan's; Corofin
Club titles
- Donegal/Galway titles: 3
College
- Years: College
- NUI Galway
Inter-county
- Years: County
- c. 1973?–c. 1977 c. 1978–19?? c. 1983: Donegal; Galway; Donegal
- Ulster titles: 2

Paul McGettigan (born 1957/8) is a former Gaelic footballer, manager and barrister. He played inter-county football for Donegal and Galway. His club career included time with Donegal club St Eunan's and Galway clubs Salthill, St Grellan's and Corofin. He played in midfield.

== Early life and education ==
McGettigan was born to footballer James "Gouldie" McGettigan and his wife Cora (née Embleton). He was one of four daughters and seven sons (including fellow Donegal footballer Leslie). One of McGettigan's brothers died at the age of sixteen in 1986 and another at the age of forty in 2009.

McGettigan attended Gormanston College in East Meath. With them he was part of the 1973 All-Ireland Hogan Cup winning team that saw off St Jarlath's College of Tuam in the final.

McGettigan attended University College Galway where he studied commerce and played in the Sigerson Cup with the university football team.

== Playing career ==
=== Club ===
McGettigan played with various clubs in his time. He reached the final of the All-Ireland Senior Club Football Championship with St Grellan's in 1980 but they lost to St Finbarr's. He won a Donegal Senior Football Championship with St Eunan's in 1983.

=== Inter-county ===
McGettigan made his senior-inter-county debut for Donegal against Leitrim in the National Football League at the age of sixteen. The next year he won his first Ulster Senior Football Championship medal when Donegal defeated Down following a replay. Thus he contested the 1974 All-Ireland Senior Football Championship, when Donegal fell to Galway at the semi-final stage. He was still a minor in 1974 and played both the Ulster MFC and SFC semi-finals on the same day.

Then, the fall. McGettigan later reminisced upon the event; having travelled north for a Dr McKenna Cup final against Fermanagh, "the guy that brought me up had never been where the match was being played. He took a wrong turn and the teams were going out on the field. I was told that I wouldn't start in the circumstances, but to go in to tog out, I'd be on the bench". Towards the end, full back Pauric McShea insisted McGettigan be brought on. "As it turned out we lost the game by a point, but I was told leaving after the Fermanagh game that I would be in the Championship team in two weeks time against Derry in Ballybofey. When the team was picked I was dropped off the team and the panel for disciplinary reasons, circumstances for which I was never told what had happened… I vowed at that time I would never play with Donegal again, I played with Galway in the Connacht Final the following year". The incident caused a media furore. McGettigan vowed never to wear the Donegal jersey again.

Having moved to live and work in Galway, McGettigan took up inter-county football with that county in 1978, and was part of a side that contested a Connacht final in his first year there (Roscommon won that contest). McGettigan, however, reversed his earlier decision and returned to play for Donegal in 1983 — just in time to win a second Ulster Senior Football Championship medal. McGettigan's return was pivotal; he partnered under-21 player Anthony Molloy at centrefield in the Ulster final, which meant Michael Lafferty could revert to his normal centre-back and Martin Griffin to his normal full-back position.

Again though, Donegal met Galway in the All-Ireland semi-final and, again, Galway secured a win.

=== Provincial ===
McGettigan played for Ulster in the Railway Cup at a time when he was the only Donegal inclusion on that team.

== Coaching ==
McGettigan led Corofin to that club's first All-Ireland Senior Club Football Championship title in 1998. He had previously coached the club's minor team but took over as senior manager in 1997, following many of the players he had coached as young men, and on the proviso that Tony Murphy would be joint manager.

== Honours ==
- Hogan Cup: 1973
- Galway Senior Football Championship: 1979, 1980
- All-Ireland Senior Club Football Championship runner-up: 1980
- Donegal Senior Football Championship: 1983
- Ulster Senior Football Championship: 1974, 1983

== Personal life ==
McGettigan resides on the coastal resort of Salthill. He is married to Geraldine, originally from Claremorris, who is the sister of Jimmy Duggan (which is where McGettigan's involvement with Corofin originated).
