= 2001 International Rules Series =

- Event: International Rules Series
Australia	Ireland
105	130
- 130–105 on aggregate, Ireland win series 2–0

First Test
Australia	Ireland
53	59
- Date: 12 October 2001
- Venue: Melbourne Cricket Ground, Melbourne, Victoria
- Referee: Brett Allen (Australia); Pat McEnaney (Ireland)
- Attendance: 48,121

Second Test
Ireland	Australia
71	52
- Date: 19 October 2001
- Venue: Football Park, Adelaide, South Australia
- Referee: Brett Allen (Australia); Pat McEnaney (Ireland)
- Attendance: 31,713

The 2001 International Rules Series was the eighth annual International Rules Series and the fourth time a Test series of international rules football has been played between Ireland and Australia since the series resumed in 1998.

The series was won by Ireland, who recorded their third series win in four attempts and their second on Australian soil. The win marked Ireland's first clean sweep of the series, as they defeated the Australians in both Test matches and recorded a 130–105 aggregate points winning margin.

== Series overview ==
The AFL appointed Garry Lyon as coach for Australia, for his first time as coach of the national team and also his only coaching appointment, whilst Brian McEniff ended his tenure as Ireland manager in the series. In the first Test at the MCG, both teams traded overs as Irish captain Anthony Tohill scored twice over the bar following impressive marks in the forward line to leave the visitors 14-10 up at the first break. Australia then dominated a patch of 10 minutes in the second quarter, scoring 16 points to nil with Richmond midfielder Joel Bowden scoring twice and Brad Johnson and Simon Black chiming in as well. Ireland recovered to narrow the gap to 6 points at half time (28-22) yet gifted a start to Australia in the third quarter when Blake Caracella was left virtually unmanned in the attacking sector to latch on to a rebound off the post and knock it into the net for the game's first six pointer. Trailing by 10, Ireland hit back with an exchange between Graham Geraghty and Tohill resulting in the latter's hurried finish into the back of the net. Crowley and Earley combined for an over apiece for the visitors to leave scores level at 41-41 at the final break. Ireland then ran away with an unassailable lead six minutes into the final quarter, Brendan Devenney scoring a fine over before a remarkable solo goal from Kieran McGeeney which began with a 40-yard run from his own half and ended with a terrible flap from Australian keeper Simon Goodwin. The Australians kept up the pressure by scoring some important overs and reduced the margin to a more manageable six points by the end.

With all to play for in the second Test, it was Sydney Swans youngster Tadhg Kennelly who played the game of his life, scoring 5 overs and creating a handful of others, ensuring he would be man of the match. For Australia, the pick of the highlights was a Matthew Lloyd half-volleyed goal from 21 metres out in the second quarter. The first half was indeed a frenetic, free-flowing one; Ireland's Graham Geraghty soccer in past Goodwin into the back of the net early in the second quarter, whilst North Melbourne midfielder Brent Harvey scored two impressive overs in the first half. Ireland's impressive nous with the round ball was keeping them in touch, Tohill combining with a Kennelley midfield move to finish in the back of the net for Ireland in the first quarter. Australia led by a single point (33-32) at half time. Ireland made their move in the third quarter, Kennelley and Devenney scoring two overs apiece to stretch the margin which would have been much more if not for a fine Goodwin save to deny Seamus Moynihan. Australia lost composure as Caracella was binned for a head high tackle on Seán Marty Lockhart. Some late dominance by Pádraic Joyce for Ireland saw their lead stretch to 12 at the final break (56-44). In the final, an all-in melee erupted for several minutes which resulted in Crowley and Hardwick each being binned, though it failed to dampen the speed and skill of both teams who traded successive overs. Ireland pulled away late thanks to a mighty Kennelley effort from a long way out, leaving Australia 19 points adrift and the series now well and truly over as a conTest. Australian publications wrote that Harvey was in everything in the middle of the ground, Stuart Maxfield had plenty of the ball but was plagued by poor disposal and Adam Goodes, Matthew Lappin and Matthew Lloyd played well up forward, despite the latter spurning a valuable goal chance in the third quarter. The match finished in Ireland's favour 71-52.

Matthew Lloyd was the winner of the Jim Stynes Medal for Australia and Darren Fay, who played a relentless role in defence was Player of the Series for Ireland.

== Squads ==
Australia			Ireland		
Name	Team	Position	Name	Team	Position
Darren Gaspar	Richmond		Cormac Sullivan	Meath	
Michael Voss (c)	Brisbane		Anthony Rainbow	Kildare	
Brad Ottens	Richmond		Darren Fay	Meath	
Jonathan Hay	Hawthorn		Seán Marty Lockhart	Derry	
Joel Bowden	Richmond		Eamonn O'Hara	Sligo	
Stuart Maxfield	Sydney		Séamus Moynihan	Kerry	
Josh Francou	Port Adelaide		Seán Óg De Paor	Galway	
Matthew Lappin	Carlton		Anthony Tohill	Derry	
Daniel Chick	Hawthorn		Darragh Ó Sé	Kerry	
Matthew Lloyd	Essendon		Pádraic Joyce	Galway	
Nick Stevens	Port Adelaide		Tadhg Kennelly	Sydney Swans / Kerry	
Simon Black	Brisbane		Michael Donnellan	Galway	
Craig Bradley	Carlton		Graham Geraghty	Meath	
Andrew McLeod	Adelaide		Dermot Earley	Kildare	
Darryl White	Brisbane		Johnny Crowley	Kerry	
Damien Hardwick	Essendon		Ciarán Whelan	Dublin	
Adam Ramanauskas	Essendon		Kieran McGeeney	Armagh	
Brent Harvey	North Melbourne		Ciaran McManus	Offaly	
Blake Caracella	Essendon		Cormac McAnallen	Tyrone	
David King	North Melbourne		Graham Canty	Cork	
Simon Goodwin	Adelaide		Brendan Devenney	Donegal	
Nigel Lappin	Brisbane		Mike Frank Russell	Kerry	
Adam Goodes	Sydney		Niall Buckley	Kildare	
Warren Tredrea	Port Adelaide		Coman Goggins	Dublin	
Matthew Nicks	Sydney		Francie Grehan	Roscommon	
Joel Smith	Hawthorn		Brendan Ger O'Sullivan	Cork	
			Dermot McCabe	Cavan	

== Matches ==
=== First Test (12 October) ===
Team	1	2	3	4	Total
Australia	0.3.1	0.8.4	1.10.5	1.13.8	(53)
Ireland	0.4.2	0.6.4	1.10.5	2.13.8	(59)
Ireland won by 6	G.O.P	G.O.P	G.O.P	G.O.P	Final

Date	Friday 12 October 2001
Scoring (AUS)	Goals: Caracella Overs: Goodes 3, Bowden 3, Harvey 2, Lloyd 2 Johnson, Black, Caracella
Scoring (IRL)	Goals: Tohill, McGeeney Overs: Devenney 4, Geraghty 3, Tohill 2, Crowley, Earley, Kennelly, McAnallen
Best	AUS: Bradley, J Johnson, Bowden, Nicks, McLeod; IRL: Geraghty, Devenney, Moynihan, Lockhart, Fay
Injuries	Nil
Venue	Melbourne Cricket Ground, Melbourne, VIC
Attendance	48,121
Umpires	Brett Allen (Australia), Pat McEnaney (Ireland)

=== Second Test (19 October) ===
Team	1	2	3	4	Total
Australia	0.4.3	1.8.3	1.11.5	1.13.7	(52)
Ireland	1.3.1	2.6.2	2.13.5	2.17.8	(71)
Ireland by 19	G.O.P	G.O.P	G.O.P	G.O.P	Final

Date	Friday, 19 October 2001
Scoring (AUS)	Goals: Lloyd Overs: Lappin 3, Harvey 3, Lloyd 2, Maxfield, Francou, Ottens, Smith, Goodes
Scoring (IRL)	Goals: Geraghty, Tohill Overs: Kennelly 5, Joyce 3, Devenney 2, O'Sullivan 2, Crowley 2, Earley, Donnellan, Geraghty
Best	AUS: Lappin, McLeod, Fletcher, Lovett, Gilbee IRL: Kelly, McVeigh, Munnelly, Cavanagh, Canty
Injuries	Nil
Venue	Football Park, Adelaide, SA
Attendance	31,713
Umpires	Brett Allen (Australia), Pat McEnaney (Ireland)

== See also ==
- International rules football
- Gaelic football
- Australian rules football
- Comparison of Australian rules football and Gaelic football
