= Dara Gallagher =

Irish Gaelic footballer

Sport
- Sport: Gaelic football
Club
- Years: Club
- ?–: Naomh Conaill
Club titles
- Donegal titles: 3
Inter-county
- Years: County
- ?–?: Donegal

Dara Gallagher is an Irish Gaelic footballer who played for Naomh Conaill and the Donegal county team.

In 2005, Gallagher played (and scored) for his club in the final replay of the Donegal Senior Football Championship. He also played for his club in the final of the 2010 Donegal Senior Football Championship. He then played for his club in the final of the 2015 Donegal Senior Football Championship. His team won all three games.

Gallagher played and scored in the final as Donegal won their first Ulster minor title in 10 years at Croke Park in 2006. In 2009, he made a substitute appearance for the Donegal senior team in the second half of their Championship defeat to Cork at Croke Park. He was injured in 2010.
