= 2014 Donegal Senior Football Championship =

Donegal S.F.C.
- Craobh Sinsear Peile; Dhún na nGall

Tournament details
- County: Donegal
- Year: 2014

Winners
- Champions: St Eunan's (14th win)
- Manager: Maxi Curran
- Captain: Rory Kavanagh

Promotion/Relegation
- Promoted team(s): Cloich Cheann Fhaola
- Relegated team(s): Réalt na Mara

The 2014 Donegal Senior Football Championship was the 92nd official edition of the Donegal GAA's premier club Gaelic football tournament for senior graded teams in County Donegal.

Glenswilly was defending champion. The club was dethroned in the 2014 final.

== Format ==
It was announced in 2013 that the 2014 championship would begin as soon as the senior Donegal county team was eliminated from the Sam Maguire Cup, which, as it transpired, was in September after the 2014 All-Ireland Senior Football Championship final. The deferral was decided upon in September 2013 when twenty clubs voted in favour, while six did not (one club was not in attendance). The controversy over this decision became a "national media story" and irked inter-county manager Jim McGuinness.

The format remained the same as the previous year, when a group stage was introduced. 28 September Round 1 SFC; 5 October Round 2 SFC; 12 October Round 3 SFC; 19 October SFC quarter-final; 26 October SFC semi-final; 2 November SFC final.

== Group stage ==
=== Group 1 ===
Team	Pld	W	L	D	PF	PA	PD	Pts
Naomh Conaill	3	3	0	0	31	24	+7	6
St Eunan's	3	2	1	0	51	29	+22	4
Malin	3	1	2	0	47	42	+5	2
Naomh Muire	3	0	3	0	30	64	-34	0

Round 1

- Naomh Muire 0-10, 0-12 Naomh Conaill, The Banks, 27/9/2014
- Malin 2-6, 1-17 St Eunan's, Connolly Park, 28/9/2014

Round 2

- Naomh Conaill 0-10, 0-7 Malin, Glenties, 4/10/2014
- St Eunan's 1-21, 1-5 Naomh Muire, O'Donnell Park, 5/10/2014

Round 3

- Naomh Muire 1-9, 6-10 Malin, Connolly Park, 12/10/2014
- Naomh Conaill 0-9, 0-7 St Eunan's, Glenties, 12/10/2014

=== Group 2 ===
Team	Pld	W	L	D	PF	PA	PD	Pts
Four Masters	3	2	0	1	48	27	+21	5
Ard an Rátha	3	1	0	2	35	34	+1	4
Seán Mac Cumhaills	3	1	1	1	35	41	-6	3
Glenfin	3	0	3	0	27	45	-18	0

Round 1

- Glenfin 0-8, 0-13 Seán Mac Cumhaills, Glenfin, 27/9/2014
- Four Masters 0-9, 0-9 Ard an Rátha, Pairc Tir Conaill, 28/9/2014

Round 2

- Seán Mac Cumhaills 0-9, 2-14 Four Masters, MacCumhaill Park, 4/10/2014
- Ard an Rátha 0-13, 1-9 Glenfin, Ard an Rátha, 5/10/2014

Round 3

- Seán Mac Cumhaills 0-13, 2-7 Ard an Rátha, MacCumhaill Park, 11/10/2014
- Glenfin 0-7, 2-13 Four Masters, Glenfin, 11/10/2014

=== Group 3 ===
Team	Pld	W	L	D	PF	PA	PD	Pts
An Clochán Liath	3	2	1	0	28	26	+2	4
Termon	3	1	1	1	30	31	-1	3
Gaoth Dobhair	3	1	1	1	32	31	+1	3
Na Cealla Beaga	3	0	1	2	24	26	-2	2

Round 1

- Na Cealla Beaga 1-6, 1-6 Gaoth Dobhair, Killybegs, 27/9/2014
- An Clochán Liath 0-11, 0-8 Termon, An Clochán Liath, 28/9/2014

Round 2

- Gaoth Dobhair 1-8, 0-8 An Clochán Liath, Gaoth Dobhair, 5/10/2014
- Termon 0-8, 1-5 Na Cealla Beaga, Termon, 5/10/2014

Round 3

- Termon 0-14, 1-9 Gaoth Dobhair, Termon, 12/10/2014
- An Clochán Liath 0-9, 0-7 Na Cealla Beaga, An Clochán Liath, 12/10/2014

=== Group 4 ===
Team	Pld	W	L	D	PF	PA	PD	Pts
Glenswilly	3	2	1	0	46	23	+23	4
St Michael's	3	2	1	0	41	18	+23	4
Cill Chartha	3	2	1	0	44	23	+21	4
Réalt na Mara	3	0	3	0	18	85	-67	0

Round 1

- St Michael's 4-10, 0-6 Réalt na Mara, Dunfanaghy, 27/9/2014
- Glenswilly 0-6, 0-9 Cill Chartha, Glenswilly, 28/9/2014

Round 2

- Réalt na Mara 0-9, 6-15 Glenswilly, Bundoran, 4/10/2014
- Cill Chartha 0-5, 2-8 St Michael's, 5/10/2014

Round 3

- Cill Chartha 5-15, 0-3 Réalt na Mara, Kilcar, 11/10/2014
- Glenswilly 1-4, 1-2 St Michael's, Glenswilly, 11/10/2014

== Knock-out stage ==
Quarter-finals
Four Masters	0-7
St Eunan's	2-10
An Clochán Liath	0-10
St Michael's	1-13
Glenswilly	3-9
Termon	0-4
Naomh Conaill	0-9 R
Ard an Rátha	1-5 R

Semi-finals
St Eunan's
St Michael's
Glenswilly
Naomh Conaill

Final
St Eunan's	0-9
Glenswilly	0-6

Quarter-finals

- Four Masters 0-7, 2-10 St Eunan's, MacCumhaill Park, 18/10/2014
- An Clochán Liath 0-10, 1-13 St Michael's, MacCumhaill Park, 19/10/2014
- Glenswilly 3-9, 0-4 Termon, O'Donnell Park, 19/10/2014,
- Naomh Conaill 0-12, 1-9 Ard an Rátha, Tír Conaill Park, 19/10/2014

Quarter-final replay

- Naomh Conaill 0-9, 1-5 Ard an Rátha, MacCumhaill Park, 22/10/2014

Semi-finals

- St Eunan's 1-12, 2-8 St Michael's, MacCumhaill Park, 26/10/2014
- Naomh Conaill 0-8, 0-10 Glenswilly, O'Donnell Park, 26/10/2014

Final

- St Eunan's 0-9, 0-6 Glenswilly, MacCumhaill Park, 2/11/2014

=== Final ===
Ahead of the final Glenswilly player and Donegal captain Michael Murphy was named Ireland captain for the 2014 International Rules Test, the second consecutive year this had happened.

Naomh Conaill lost a last ditch appeal to contest the final. Their grievance came from a black-card incident in their semi-final, involving Glenswilly's Ciaran Bonner. Glenswilly led the Glenties-based team by one point with two minutes of normal time remaining, when Bonner got the black card and was replaced by substitute Oisín Crawford. Bonner, Naomh Conaill maintained, was not eligible to be replaced as he had already picked up a yellow card.

Glenswilly lost.

2 November 2014; Final	St Eunan's	0-9 - 0-6	Glenswilly	MacCumhaill Park; Attendance: 6,000; Referee: M. Coll (Gaoth Dobhair); Man of the Match: John Haran

== Relegation play-offs ==
=== Relegation semi-finals ===
- Na Calla Beaga w, l Réalt na Mara, Tir Conaill Park, 19/10/2015,
- Naomh Mhuire w, l Glenfin, Glenswilly, 19/10/2015,

=== Relegation final ===
- Glenfin w, l Réalt na Mara
