= Dermot McCabe =

Cavan Gaelic footballer

Personal information
- Born: 17 May 1976 (age 50) County Cavan, Ireland
- Height: 6 ft 2 in (188 cm)

Sport
- Sport: Gaelic football
- Position: Midfield
Club
- Years: Club
- Gowna
Club titles
- Cavan titles: 6
Inter-county
Years	County	Apps (scores)
1995–2009	Cavan	70 (7–133)
Inter-county titles
- Ulster titles: 1
- All Stars: 1

Dermot McCabe (born 17 May 1976) is an Irish Gaelic football manager and former player, for Gowna and the Cavan county team. He briefly managed the Westmeath county team but gave up after less than 10 months.

== Summary ==
McCabe emerged on the Cavan team that lost the 1995 Ulster Senior Football Championship (SFC) final to Tyrone. He helped Cavan reach the 1996 All-Ireland Under 21 Football Championship final, but lost to Kerry. In 1997, McCabe played on the Cavan team that won the Ulster SFC, beating Derry at St Tiernach's Park. He won an All Star that year. McCabe played for Ireland against Australia in the revived 1998 International Rules Series, scoring 14 points. He was selected again for Ireland when they won the 2001 International Rules Series.

In 2011, he was part of the Cavan minor team management when they won the Ulster Minor Football Championship. In October 2024, he began managing Westmeath. He abandoned Westmeath less than 10 months later.

== Honours ==
Cavan

- Ulster Senior Football Championship (1): 1997
- Ulster Under-21 Football Championship (1): 1996

Gowna

- Cavan Senior Football Championship (6): 1994, 1996, 1997, 1999, 2000, 2002

Individual

- All Star Award (1): 1997
