= Seamie Granaghan =

Donegal Gaelic footballer

Sport
- Sport: Gaelic football
Club
- Years: Club
- ?–?: ?
Club titles
- Donegal titles: 8
Inter-county
Years	County	Apps (scores)
?–?	Donegal	?
- Ulster titles: 2

Seamie Granaghan is an Irish Gaelic footballer who played for the Donegal county team.

Along with Brian McEniff, he won a joint record eight Donegal Senior Football Championship winners' medals during the 1960s and 1970s.

He was half-forward during Donegal's 1972 and 1974 Ulster Senior Football Championship final victories. He was the only player to score in every game during both 1972 and 1974 runs.

Handball had a role in his development. His daughter married Paul Brennan in October 2023.
