= John Haran =

Irish Gaelic footballer

Personal information
- Born: 4 November 1976 (age 49) Letterkenny
- Occupation: Principal of St Bernadette's Special School

Sport
- Sport: Gaelic football
Club
- Years: Club
- 1995–: St Eunan's
Club titles
- Donegal titles: 8
Inter-county
- Years: County
- 1990s–2000s: Donegal

John Haran (born 4 November 1976) is an Irish former Gaelic footballer who played for St Eunan's and the Donegal county team. He definitely has 8 Donegal Senior Football Championships (though the first one is a matter of some dispute). He also has a hat-trick of Donegal Senior, Senior "B" and Senior "C Championships, adding the C" in 2019.

He became chairman of his club in late 2019, having served five years as vice-chairman.

== Early life ==
The son of a Garda from County Sligo, Haran was born in and grew up in County Donegal.

He learned his trade on the St Eunan's College fields near the Hawthorn Heights area, alongside players including Eamonn Haran, Niall Doherty, Conal Gibbons, Barney McDermott, Seamie Nallen, John Anderson, Karl Campbell and Packie Gibbons. He also played for Glencar Street League teams coached by Seamus Haran and Martin Anderson. Haran won underage titles at almost all levels with St Eunan's. He attended boarding school at St Jarlath's College in Tuam, County Galway, from 1989 to 1995. In doing so he followed his brother Eamon, as well as family friend Leslie McGettigan. While attending St Jarlath's, Haran played with future Galway footballers Michael Donnellan, John ('Scan') Colcannon, Declan and Tomás Meehan, Tommy and Pádraic Joyce, as well as fellow Donegal men Kevin Winston and Alan McFadden. He cites Fr Oliver Hughes and Joe Long as his main influences. He was part of the 1994 Hogan Cup-winning team.

Having repeated his Leaving Certificate (in an effort to win a Hogan Cup on the field), Haran attended UL for a brief stint.

== Playing career ==
Haran made his debut for St Eunan's in 1995. He won eight Donegal Senior Football Championships, the last of which came in 2014 (including the infamous 1997 championship which was won on the pitch then lost in the boardroom, but which Haran personally counts) before he retired from senior football in 2017. In spite of this "retirement", Haran was man of the match in the final of the 2014 Donegal Senior Football Championship.

Declan Bonner handed him his inter-county league debut in 1998. He made his championship debut against Cavan at Breffni Park on 12 May 2002. He started the first game of Brian McEniff's last spell as Donegal manager, a league defeat to Galway in Tuam in February 2003. He made a late substitute appearance for John Gildea in the 2003 All-Ireland Senior Football Championship semi-final against Armagh.

Haran has been sent off in the past.

He also played for St Mary's in the Sigerson Cup.

He was one of those who made known his displeasure at Vincent Hogan over Hogan's infamous "sheep" jibe against Jim McGuinness and his team in a national newspaper.

He now plays on the reserve team for St Eunan's and in the Autumn of 2018 won his first Donegal Senior Reserve Championship medal, coming off the bench against Naomh Conaill to help steer the youthful Letterkenny side to victory.

== Administrative career ==
Haran served as vice-chairman of his club for five years, before succeeding Cathal Green as chairman in late 2019. Eugene Duffy succeeded Haran as chairman in 2025.

== Teaching career ==
Haran attended St Mary's Teacher Training College in Belfast in 2004–05. He got to know Michaela McAreavey well, along with her brother Mark, who were both attending at the same time.

On 10 February 2020, Haran was appointed principal of St Bernadette's Special School on College Farm Road, Letterkenny.

== Media career ==
In August 2026, he discredited himself by setting off an unfounded rumour that professional association football player Séamus Coleman would be starting a match for his local GAA club in Killybegs. Coleman did not play, but Haran succeeded in getting the BBC excited anyway. Haran said he thought he would "stick it out for the craic". It spawned copycat rumours such as that Sarah Jessica Parker would be playing for her local GAA club in Kilcar.

== Honours ==
=== Player ===
- Hogan Cup: 1994
- Donegal Senior Football Championship: 1999, 2001, 2007, 2008, 2009, 2012, 2014
- Donegal Senior "B" Football Championship: INSERT YEAR(S) HERE PLEASE
- Donegal Senior "C" Football Championship: 2019

=== Individual ===
- Donegal Senior Football Championship Man of the Match: 2014
