= Niall McCready =

Irish Gaelic footballer

Personal information
- Native name: Níall Mac Riada (Irish)

Sport
- Sport: Gaelic football
- Position: Back
Club
- Years: Club
- 199?–201?: Aodh Ruadh
Inter-county
- Years: County
- c. 1990s–200?: Donegal

Niall McCready is an Irish former Gaelic footballer who played for Aodh Ruadh and the Donegal county team.

He won an Ulster Under-21 Football Championship medal with Donegal in 1995.

He started the first game of Brian McEniff's last spell as Donegal manager, a league defeat to Galway in Tuam in February 2003.

He played in the 2003 All-Ireland Senior Football Championship semi-final against Armagh.

He made a substitute appearance for his club in the final of the 2012 Donegal Intermediate Football Championship.

He is the actual godson of Brian McEniff.

In 2022, McCready was announced as trainer of Naomh Bríd under the management of Aidan Murray.
