= Paul Brennan (Gaelic footballer) =

Irish Gaelic footballer (born 1988/89)

Personal information
- Native name: Pól Ó Braonáin (Irish)
- Born: 1988/9
- Occupation: Diver
- Height: 6 ft 0 in (183 cm)

Sport
- Sport: Gaelic football
- Position: Half back
Club
- Years: Club
- 201?–: Réalt na Mara
Inter-county
- Years: County
- 2017–: Donegal
- Ulster titles: 2

Paul Brennan (born 1988/89) is an Irish Gaelic footballer who plays for Réalt na Mara and the Donegal county team.

He won two Ulster Senior Football Championship medals, in 2018 and 2019.

== Playing career ==
A native of Kinlough in Leitrim, Brennan started his inter-county career with Leitrim, but transferred to the neighbouring county of Donegal after falling out with the county board. Brennan won back-to-back FBD League titles with Leitrim in 2013 and 2014.

Brennan was involved with club football in Donegal, and won a Donegal Intermediate Football Championship with Réalt na Mara in 2015. He was described as "one of the driving forces" in the club's IFC win.

Brennan first featured for Donegal at senior level under the management of Rory Gallagher. He made his first competitive start for Donegal against Kerry in the opening round of the 2017 National Football League. He scored a point in that game. He made his championship debut against.

Brennan continued to feature for his county under the management of Declan Bonner. He started and scored two points in the final as Donegal won the 2018 Ulster Senior Football Championship. He had started all his team's earlier championship matches that year, scoring two points in the semi-final against Down. He also scored a point against Galway at O'Donnell Park during the 2018 National Football League.

He was an unused substitute in the victory over Meath in the 2019 National Football League Division 2 Final at Croke Park. He had, however, featured earlier in the league campaign, against Clare (from the start), the home fixture against Meath (as a late substitute), Tipperary, Fermanagh and Armagh (all as a substitute), Cork (from the start) and Kildare (as a substitute).

Brennan made a second half substitute appearance in the final of the 2019 Ulster Senior Football Championship, which Donegal also won. He also made substitute appearances against Fermanagh in the quarter-final and against Tyrone in the semi-final.

Brennan started Donegal's first five fixtures of the 2020 National Football League against Mayo, Meath, Galway, Dublin and Monaghan, scoring a point against Mayo in the opening game. Then the COVID-19 pandemic brought play to a halt. Play resumed behind closed doors on 18 October with a home game against Tyrone; Brennan started that game as well. He did not participate in the concluding game of the league campaign (away to Kerry) as he and other senior players (such as Michael Murphy, Hugh McFadden, Ryan McHugh and Eoghan Bán Gallagher) were rested ahead of the 2020 Ulster Senior Football Championship quarter-final against Tyrone the following Sunday. Brennan started that opening victory against Tyrone, scoring one point. He also started the semi-final victory against Armagh and the final against Cavan, in what proved to be the season's concluding game for his team.

Brennan started each of Donegal's first three of four fixtures of the 2021 National Football League (against Tyrone, Monaghan, Armagh); he did not feature against Dublin. In the 2021 Ulster Senior Football Championship, he made a substitute appearance in each of Donegal's three fixtures, scoring a point against Derry in the quarter-final.

Brennan started each of Donegal's opening three fixtures of the 2022 National Football League, against Mayo, Kildare and Kerry respectively. He did not feature against either Tyrone or Monaghan in the fourth and fifth fixtures. He made a substitute appearance away to Dublin in the penultimate fixture, but did not play against Armagh at O'Donnell Park in the next game. In the 2022 Ulster Senior Football Championship, he made substitute appearances in two of Donegal's three fixtures, the quarter-final against Armagh and the final against Derry (during extra-time). He did not feature in the semi-final against Cavan. He also did not feature in the 2022 All-Ireland Senior Football Championship qualifier loss to Armagh.

He was announced as part of Declan Bonner's management team at Erne Gaels in late 2023.

== Personal life ==
Brennan's father is Brendan and his mother is Rita. In late-2023, he married Bundoran native and palliative nurse Colleen Granaghan, whose father Seamie played at half-forward during Donegal's 1972 and 1974 Ulster SFC title victories. At that time the couple had two sons.

He is not related to Jamie, with whom he has lined out for club and county.

== Honours ==
;Leitrim * FBD Connacht League: 2013, 2014

Réalt na Mara

- Donegal Intermediate Football Championship: 2015

Donegal

- Ulster Senior Football Championship: 2018, 2019
- National Football League Division 2: 2019
