= Cathal Corey =

Gaelic football manager

Sport
- Sport: Gaelic football
Club management
- Years: Club
- c. 2010 2021–: Kildress Wolfe Tones; Castledawson; Banagher; Slaughtneil; Naomh Conaill; Réalt na Mara
Inter-county management
- Years: Team
- 2017–2018: Sligo

Cathal Corey (Irish pronunciation: [ˈkahəlˠ]) is a Gaelic football manager and former player from County Tyrone. He played for the Kildress Wolfe Tones club, though he never played for his county. He has managed several clubs throughout Ulster, as well as the Sligo county team. His most noted achievement in club management is leading Naomh Conaill to both the Donegal Senior Football Championship and the final of the Ulster Senior Club Football Championship in 2010.

== Management career ==
Corey managed Kildress Wolfe Tones in his native county, as well as Castledawson, Banagher and Slaughtneil in Derry, leading Slaughtneil to a league title. He then led Naomh Conaill to the 2010 Donegal Senior Football Championship (after also leading them as far as the final the previous year) and then led Naomh Conaill to a first Ulster Senior Club Football Championship final. He first worked with Jim McGuinness at Kildress as early as 2003. Corey and McGuinness were joint-managers of Naomh Conaill for the 2010 Senior County Championship title-winning campaign.

Corey was appointed Sligo senior manager in October 2017. He had previously applied for the vacant Donegal post, but Donegal native Declan Bonner was favoured instead. Corey oversaw Sligo's 2018 season. He later resigned.

In January 2021, Corey was appointed as senior football manager of the Réalt na Mara club.

Preceded by Niall Carew	Sligo Senior Football Manager; 2017–2018	Succeeded by Paul Taylor
