= Blake Caracella =

Australian rules footballer, born 1977

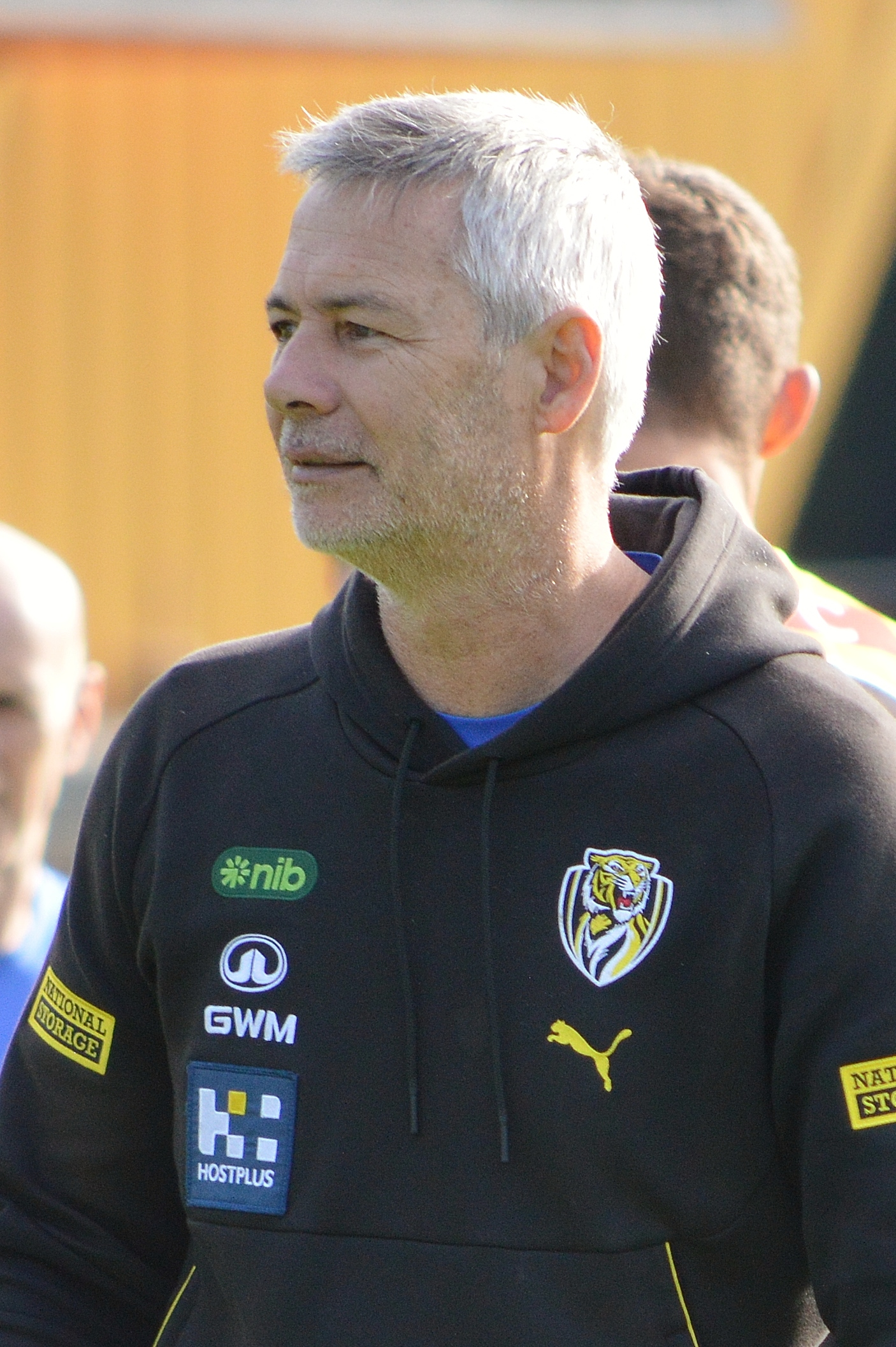
- Caracella with Richmond in May 2026

Personal information
- Full name: Blake Caracella
- Born: 15 March 1977 (age 49); Melbourne, Victoria
- Original team: Northern Knights (TAC Cup)
- Draft: No. 10, 1994 national draft No. 2, 2004 pre-season draft
- Height: 186 cm (6 ft 1 in)
- Weight: 85 kg (187 lb)
- Position: Midfielder / Forward

Playing career^{1}
Years	Club	Games (Goals)
1997–2002	Essendon	126 (151)
2003–2004	Brisbane Lions	34 (33)
2005–2006	Collingwood	27 (34)
Total		187 (218)

International team honours^{2}
Years	Team	Games (Goals)
2000–2001	Australia	4 (8)
- ^{1} Playing statistics correct to the end of 2006.^{2} Representative statistics correct as of 2001.

Career highlights
- 2× AFL premiership player: 2000, 2003; AFL Rising Star nominee: 1997

Blake Caracella (born 15 March 1977) is a former Australian rules footballer who played in the Australian Football League (AFL). He is currently serving as an assistant coach with the Richmond Football Club.

== AFL career ==
=== Essendon ===
Selected by Essendon in the 1994 National draft at pick 10, Caracella finally debuted with the Bombers in 1997. What had held him back was his lack of bulk—he came to the club weighing only 74 kg—however, he rectified this by pushing his playing weight up to 83 kg prior to his AFL debut. Caracella quickly established himself in the side as a skilful small forward/goalsneak, who had patience and poise. He earned himself an AFL Rising Star nomination for his work.

He was a vital part of Essendon's premiership win in 2000, contributing 35 goals for the season.

Caracella was a late inclusion to represent Australia in the first Test of the two-Test series in the 2000 International Rules Series against Ireland. He starred in the first Test, kicking a hat-trick of three-pointers (overs) during the final quarter to help secure a come-from-behind victory, scoring four overs in total. He was also among the best players for the second Test, scoring an additional three overs and helping Australia break Ireland's three-match winning streak. Caracella returned the next year and scored the only goal for Australia in the first Test as well an over in the same Test. He was less impactful in the second Test when Ireland reclaimed the title.

At the end of 2002, he was controversially traded to the Brisbane Lions.

=== Brisbane ===
Caracella's stay in Brisbane only lasted two years, during which he played 34 games, including the Lions' 2003 premiership-winning team and also their unsuccessful 2004 AFL Grand Final side. Reasons cited for his trade from both Essendon and Brisbane was to ease the strain of salary cap restrictions at both clubs.

=== Collingwood ===
Caracella was selected by Collingwood in the 2005 pre-season draft, the team that he supported as a child.

In 2005, Caracella had a solid year at Collingwood (apart from a lean patch in the final seven rounds where he only managed three goals, as well as missing Round 20), booting 34 goals in total and finished tenth in the Copeland Trophy.

=== Injury and retirement ===
In 2006, Caracella suffered a career-ending neck injury. Whilst contesting a loose ball against the Lions, Caracella slipped, and former teammate Tim Notting's hip accidentally collected his head, fracturing several vertebrae and bruising his spinal cord. At the time, field umpire Brett Allen did not consider the contact sufficient to award a free kick for high contact. The injury horrified the football community, drawing comparisons to the quadriplegia suffered by Footscray's Neil Sachse in the 1970s.

On Wednesday, 2 August, Caracella announced his retirement. At the press conference, Caracella revealed that scans had shown his spinal column was naturally narrower than average. This condition would have ruled out a career in any professional contact sport had it been diagnosed earlier.

== Statistics ==
Legend
G	Goals	K	Kicks	D	Disposals	T	Tackles
B	Behinds	H	Handballs	M	Marks

Season	Team	No.	Games	Totals							Averages (per game)						
Season	Team	No.	Games	G	B	K	H	D	M	T	G	B	K	H	D	M	T
1997	Essendon	33	17	25	18	187	103	290	84	15	1.5	1.1	11.0	6.1	17.1	4.9	0.9
1998	Essendon	33	16	13	7	149	97	246	78	24	0.8	0.4	9.3	6.1	15.4	4.9	1.5
1999	Essendon	33	24	31	26	210	122	332	77	26	1.3	1.1	8.8	5.1	13.8	3.2	1.1
2000	Essendon	33	24	35	17	270	219	489	138	43	1.5	0.7	11.3	9.1	20.4	5.8	1.8
2001	Essendon	33	21	25	11	256	177	433	120	29	1.2	0.5	12.2	8.4	20.6	5.7	1.4
2002	Essendon	33	24	22	14	287	151	438	111	43	0.9	0.6	12.0	6.3	18.3	4.6	1.8
2003	Brisbane Lions	1	18	17	16	177	95	272	86	33	0.9	0.9	9.8	5.3	15.1	4.8	1.8
2004	Brisbane Lions	1	16	16	11	139	86	225	61	25	1.0	0.7	8.7	5.4	14.1	3.8	1.6
2005	Collingwood	10	21	34	19	155	101	256	88	22	1.6	0.9	7.4	4.8	12.2	4.2	1.0
2006	Collingwood	10	6	0	2	65	44	109	33	8	0.0	0.3	10.8	7.3	18.2	5.5	1.3
Career			187	218	141	1895	1195	3090	876	268	1.2	0.8	10.1	6.4	16.5	4.7	1.4

== Coaching career ==
Caracella began working as an assistant coach at Collingwood in 2007 after a neck injury forced him into early retirement.

In 2010, he moved to Geelong, where he was responsible for the development of forward-line players.

In September 2016, he accepted a position as an assistant coach at Richmond under former teammate Damien Hardwick, and was part of their 2017 premiership.

On 6 August 2019, the Essendon Football Club announced Caracella would be joining their coaching department for the 2020 season. Caracella stood in as caretaker coach for Essendon in their round 4 match of the 2022 season, as regular coach Ben Rutten had to miss the match while isolating as a COVID-19 close contact. Essendon won the match by 4 points. At a press conference during his first experience of senior coaching, Caracella expressed his interest in one day becoming a full time senior coach.

In 2024, Caracella was appointed as the senior coach of Essendon's VFL team. Caracella led Essendon to 11th place on the VFL ladder, out of 21 teams. That was to be Caracella's last season at Essendon, returning to Richmond for the 2025 season.
