= Donegal Senior Football Championship =

Annual Gaelic football competition

- Current season or competition: 2026 Donegal Senior Football Championship
- Irish: Craobh Peil Sinsear Dhún na nGall
- Founded: 1920
- Title holders: St Eunan's (17th title)
- Most titles: St Eunan's (17 titles)
- Sponsors: Michael Murphy Sports and Leisure & RTÉ Raidió na Gaeltachta

The Donegal Senior Football Championship (abbreviated as Donegal SFC) is an annual football competition organised by Donegal GAA and contested by the highest-level clubs, to determine the best team in County Donegal. Since 2016, it has been known as Michael Murphy Sports and Leisure Donegal SFC after its headline sponsor.

Initially a straight knock-out competition, the Donegal SFC added a round-robin group stage in 2013. The final is played at MacCumhaill Park in Ballybofey. The winning club qualifies to represent its county in the Ulster Senior Club Football Championship, the winners of which go on to compete in the All-Ireland Senior Club Football Championship.

The winning club receives the Dr Maguire Cup. The competition has been won by 17 clubs, 14 of which have won it more than once. St Eunan's are the most successful club with 16 titles while Gaoth Dobhair are just one behind with 15 titles. The most recent team to win the competition for a first time is Glenswilly: in 2011 (followed by further title wins in 2013 and 2016). The most recent first-time finalist (with no title win) is St Michael's, also in 2011.

The reigning champions, St Eunan's, defeated Naomh Conaill in the 2026 final

== History ==
The 1996 Donegal SFC has been described as "probably the greatest ever championship in Donegal", with Na Cealla Beaga playing nine games to lift the trophy that year.

The 1997 Donegal SFC descended into controversy when St Eunan's, having beaten Aodh Ruadh in the final by a scoreline of 1–11 to 2–7, had the title stripped from them — due to St Eunan's fielding Leslie McGettigan, an illegal player. The affair made the national press and its effects continued for many months, into the following year.

In 2002, Na Cealla Beaga were thrown out of the Donegal SFC at the semi-final stage — after also being accused of fielding an illegal player, with New York again at the centre of the dispute. The player — Peter McGinley — as well as the club's chairman and secretary were banned for one year. Assistant secretary Bernard Conaghan (reported the Irish Independent) said: "We were careful not to play this player until his papers came through from New York. We sat him out for a league game and our first Championship match, we did everything we thought possible to make sure he was legal and now this has happened, it's a terrible blow". The final of that competition was not played until 2003 due to a disagreement between Ard an Rátha and Naomh Adhamhnáin over Eddie Brennan.

In 2008, Termon — described in national newspaper the Sunday Independent as "one of the smallest if not the smallest" in the county — reached an SFC final for the first time in their history.

Jim McGuinness assisted Naomh Conaill to success in the 2000s before becoming an All-Ireland SFC winning manager with Donegal. Naomh Conaill, as county champions, made it all the way to the final of the 2010 Ulster Senior Club Football Championship by defeating Cavan champions Kingscourt in the preliminary round, Monaghan champions Clontibret O'Neills in the first round proper, and Tyrone champions Coalisland in the semi-final.

Naomh Conaill was also involved in the 2020 Championship final saga, which did not conclude until 2022.

== Competition format ==
The old format, which involved a two-legged first round, was scrapped ahead of the 2013 Donegal SFC in favour of an opening round containing four groups of four teams played out as a league and one team relegated. Two of the four teams in each group advance to the (one-legged) quarter-finals after each have played the others once. The four winning quarter-finalists advance to the (one-legged) semi-finals and the winners advanced to the (one-legged) final.

Teams finishing bottom of their group play two relegation semi-finals. The losing relegation semi-final teams met in the relegation final. The losing team is relegated to the Donegal Intermediate Football Championship (Donegal IFC) to be replaced by the IFC-winning team.

The format was retained for 2014.

A "League Stage" was adopted for the 2020 competition due to the COVID-19 pandemic bringing play to a halt earlier, and restricting play later, in the year.

== Qualification for subsequent competitions ==
=== Ulster Senior Club Football Championship ===
The Donegal SFC winners qualify for the Ulster Senior Club Football Championship. It is the only team from County Donegal to qualify for this competition. The Donegal SFC winners may enter the Ulster Senior Club Football Championship at either the preliminary round or the quarter-final stage. Teams to have qualified for the final of that competition include Na Cealla Beaga, Naomh Conaill, Glenswilly and Gaoth Dobhair.

=== All-Ireland Senior Club Football Championship ===
The Donegal SFC winners – by winning the Ulster Senior Club Football Championship – may qualify for the All-Ireland Senior Club Football Championship, at which they would enter at the semi-final stage. The last team from County Donegal to do this was Gaoth Dobhair in 2018; they were knocked out by reigning (and eventual) All-Ireland champions Corofin.

== Winners and finalists ==
=== Results by team ===
Results by team
#	Team	Location	Wins	Years won	Last final lost
1	St Eunan's	Letterkenny	17	1948, 1956, 1960, 1967, 1969, 1972, 1983, 1999, 2001, 2007, 2008, 2009, 2012, 2014, 2021, 2024, 2026	2022
2	Gaoth Dobhair	Gweedore	15	1935, 1938, 1941, 1944, 1945, 1946, 1947, 1949, 1953, 1954, 1955, 1961, 2002, 2006, 2018	2025
3	Aodh Ruadh	Ballyshannon	12	1929, 1932, 1937, 1939, 1942, 1943, 1951, 1986, 1987, 1994, 1997, 1998	1999
4	Naomh Iósaef/St Joseph's	Bundoran and Ballyshannon	8	1965, 1968, 1970, 1971, 1973, 1974, 1975, 1976	1969
4	Naomh Conaill	Glenties	8	2005, 2010, 2015, 2019, 2020, 2022, 2023, 2025	2026
6	An Clochán Liath	Dungloe	7	1930, 1931, 1933, 1936, 1940, 1957, 1958	2024
7	Ard an Rátha	Ardara	6	1923, 1926, 1928, 1981, 2000, 2004	1984
7	Cill Chartha	Kilcar	6	1925, 1980, 1985, 1989, 1993, 2017	2020
7	Na Cealla Beaga	Killybegs	6	1952, 1988, 1991, 1992, 1995, 1996	2013
7	Seán MacCumhaills	Ballybofey and Stranorlar	6	1959, 1962, 1963, 1964, 1971, 1977	2004
11	Réalt na Mara	Bundoran	3	1920, 1934, 1979	1935
11	Na Ceithre Máistrí	Donegal Town	3	1982, 1984, 2003	2001
11	Glenswilly	Glenswilly	3	2011, 2013, 2016	2014
14	Naomh Columba	Glencolmcille	2	1978, 1990	1998
15	Caisleán na Finne	Castlefin	1	1922	—N/a
15	Baile Dhún na nGall	Donegal	1	1924	1954
15	Ruagairí Leitir Ceanainn	Letterkenny	1	1927	1930

=== Records ===
Naomh Conaill have established the unusual trend of winning the competition in every 21st-century year ending in "5" or "0", despite never having won it before that time.

Clubs with consecutive titles

Two clubs have completed a Donegal SFC four-in-a-row: these were Gaoth Dobhair (1944, 1945, 1946, 1947) and Naomh Iósaef/St Joseph's (1973, 1974, 1975, 1976).

Three clubs have completed a Donegal SFC three-in-a-row: these were Gaoth Dobhair (1953, 1954, 1955), Seán Mac Cumhaills (1962, 1963, 1964) and St Eunan's (2007, 2008, 2009).

Na Cealla Beaga have won consecutive Donegal SFCs on two occasions (1991, 1992 and 1995, 1996).

A merger between Aodh Ruadh and Bundoran's Réalt na Mara resulted in the formation of the hugely successful Naomh Iósaef/St Joseph's, who dominated Donegal club football in the 1960s and 1970s winning consecutive Donegal SFCs (1970, 1971) and a 'Four in a Row' between 1973 and 1976. Aodh Ruadh have won consecutive Donegal SFCs on their own on three occasions (1942 & 1943; 1986 & 1987; and 1997 & 1998).

Most medals won by a single player: (8)

Danny Gillespie (Gaoth Dobhair) – 1935, 1938, 1941, 1944, 1945, 1946, 1947, 1949
Seamie Granaghan & Brian McEniff (St Joseph's) – 1965, 1968, 1970, 1971, 1973, 1974, 1975, 1976
John Haran (St Eunan's) – 1997 (disputed), 1999, 2001, 2007, 2008, 2009, 2012, 2014
Brendan McDyer, Leo McLoone & Anthony Thompson (Naomh Conaill) – 2005, 2010, 2015, 2019, 2020, 2022, 2023, 2025

=== Finals listed by year ===
(r) = replay

(aet) = after extra time

Man of the match in the final receives the Padear McGeehin Memorial Trophy.

Year	Winner	Score	Opponent	Score	Winning captain	Man of the match	Winning manager
1920	Réalt na Mara	2–4	Killygordon	1–2			
1921	No Final						
1922	Castlefin	(by 3 points)	Glenties				
1923	Ard an Rátha	0–3	Ballybofey	0–1			
1924	Dún na nGall	3–2	An Clochán Liath	1–4			
1925	Cill Chartha						
1926	Ard an Rátha	0–5	Letterkenny Rovers	0–2			
1927	Letterkenny Rovers						
1928	Ard an Rátha	1–4	Killygordon	0–3			
1929	Aodh Ruadh	0–7	Killygordon	0–5			
1930	An Clochán Liath	3–2	Letterkenny	2–3			
1931	An Clochán Liath	2–4	Ballybofey	2–2			
1932	Aodh Ruadh	1–7	An Clochán Liath	0–1			
1933	An Clochán Liath	3–2	Réalt na Mara	1–3			
1934	Réalt na Mara	1–5	An Clochán Liath	0–4			
1935	Gaoth Dobhair	1–8	Réalt na Mara	0–3			
1936	An Clochán Liath	2–8	Ard an Rátha	2–2			
1937	Aodh Ruadh	3–8	Gaoth Dobhair	4–2			
1938	Gaoth Dobhair	1–7	Ard an Rátha	0–5			
1939	Aodh Ruadh	0–6	Gaoth Dobhair	0–4			
1940	An Clochán Liath	3–8	Aodh Ruadh	1–3			
1941	Gaoth Dobhair	0–10	Glenties	2–3			
1942	Aodh Ruadh	2–8	Glenties	1–4			
1943	Aodh Ruadh	1–9	Convoy	2–1			
1944	Gaoth Dobhair	4–10	St Eunan's	3–4			
1945	Gaoth Dobhair	4–5	Aodh Ruadh	1–6			
1946	Gaoth Dobhair	0–7	St Eunan's	0–6			
1947	Gaoth Dobhair	1–9	St Eunan's	0–3			
1948	St Eunan's	1–7	Gaoth Dobhair	2–1			
1949	Gaoth Dobhair	2–12	St Eunan's	3–4			
1950	No Final						
1951	Aodh Ruadh	1–6	Dún na nGall	1–5			
1952	Na Cealla Beaga	0–9	St Eunan's	1–5			
1953	Gaoth Dobhair	1–5	Carndonagh	1–4			
1954	Gaoth Dobhair	3–6	Dún na nGall	0–5			
1955	Gaoth Dobhair	1–7	St Eunan's	1–4			
1956	St Eunan's	0–8	Aodh Ruadh	1–2			
1957	An Clochán Liath	0–12	Aodh Ruadh	1–4			
1958	An Clochán Liath	2–6	St Eunan's	2–5			
1959	Seán MacCumhaills	2–7	Cill Chartha	1–6			
1960	St Eunan's	0–11	Gaoth Dobhair	0–3			
1961	Gaoth Dobhair	2–5	An Clochán Liath	0–6	Owenie Beag McBride		
1962	Seán MacCumhaills	1–9	Gaoth Dobhair	1–7			
1963	Seán MacCumhaills	1–6	Cill Chartha	0–4			
1964	Seán MacCumhaills	1–11	An Clochán Liath	1–3			
1965	St Joseph's	1–11	Glenties	0–10			
1966	No Final						
1967	St Eunan's	1–13	St Joseph's	1–9			
1968	St Joseph's	1–10	Seán MacCumhaills	0–5			
1969	St Eunan's	0–10	St Joseph's	1–4			
1970	St Joseph's	1–16	St Eunan's	0–4			
1971	Seán MacCumhaills	2–10	St Joseph's	0–11			
1972	St Eunan's	2–12	Clanna Gael	1–8			
1973	St Joseph's	1–8	Seán MacCumhaills	1–6			
1974	St Joseph's	1–8	St Eunan's	1–3			
1975	St Joseph's	1–11	Seán MacCumhaills	1–5			
1976	St Joseph's	1–13	Four Masters	0–5			
1977	Seán MacCumhaills	0–8	Gaoth Dobhair	0–5			
1978	Naomh Columba	1–12	Gaoth Dobhair	0–10	Michael Oliver McIntyre		
1979	Réalt na Mara	0–9	Seán MacCumhaills	1–5			
1980	Cill Chartha	1–13	Ard an Rátha	0–8	Sean McGinley	Michael Carr	
1981	Ard an Rátha	1–7	Four Masters	0–6			
1982	Four Masters	1–4	Cill Chartha	0–6			
1983	St Eunan's	0–8	Ard an Rátha	0–3			
1984	Four Masters	0–9	Ard an Rátha	1–2			
1985	Cill Chartha	0–9	Four Masters	0–7	James McHugh		
1986	Aodh Ruadh	1–8	Red Hughs	0-5	Tommy McDermott		P. J. Buggy
1987	Aodh Ruadh	2–10	Cill Chartha	1–7	Brian Tuohy		P. J. Buggy
1988	Na Cealla Beaga	2–10	Cill Chartha	2–8	Barry Cunningham	Michael Campbell	John Joe O'Shea
1989	Cill Chartha	1–9	Aodh Ruadh	0–9	John Doogan		
1990	Naomh Columba	0–10	Na Cealla Beaga	0–9	John Joe Doherty	Séamus Carr	Michael McNelis
1991	Na Cealla Beaga	2–7	Red Hughs	0–11	Denis Carberry		Jimmy White
1992	Na Cealla Beaga	0–12	Naomh Columba	0–9	Sean Gallagher		Jimmy White
1993	Cill Chartha	0–12	Na Cealla Beaga	0–10	Mark McShane		
1994	Aodh Ruadh	2–10	Naomh Columba	1–10	Sylvester Maguire		Sean Boyle
1995	Na Cealla Beaga	0–10	Naomh Columba	1-6	John Cunningham		
1996	Na Cealla Beaga	1–8	Naomh Columba	1–7	Barry McGowan	David Meehan	Pauric McShea?
1997	St Eunan's	1–11	Aodh Ruadh	2–7	Charlie O'Donnell		
1998	Aodh Ruadh	1–11	Naomh Columba	0–11	Val Murray	Michael "Sticky" Ward	Sylvester Maguire
1999	St Eunan's	1–19	Aodh Ruadh	1–11		Brendan Devenney	
2000	Ard an Rátha	1–9	St Eunan's	0–7		Michael Doherty	
2001	St Eunan's	1–10	Four Masters	0–8			
2002	Gaoth Dobhair	1–11	St Eunan's	0–10			
2003	Four Masters	0–15	Termon	0–9			
2004	Ard an Rátha	1–9	Seán MacCumhaills	0–4	Michael Doherty	Brendan Boyle	John McConnell
2005	Naomh Conaill	1–5, 0–10 (r)	St Eunan's	0–8, 1–5 (r)	Paddy Campbell		Hughie Molloy
2006	Gaoth Dobhair	1–05	St Eunan's	0–6	James Gallagher	Eamon McGee	Declan Bonner
2007	St Eunan's	0–12	Glenswilly	1–3	John Haran	Patrick McGowan	Brendan Kilcoyne
2008	St Eunan's	2–13	Termon	1–8	Brendan Devenney	Brendan Devenney	Eamon O'Boyle
2009	St Eunan's	0–13	Naomh Conaill	0–7	Brendan Devenney	Ciaran Greene	Eamon O'Boyle
2010	Naomh Conaill	1–15	Na Cealla Beaga	0–8	Anthony Thompson	Leo McLoone	Cathal Corey
2011	Glenswilly	1–8	St Michael's	0–9	Gary McFadden	Michael Murphy	Gary McDaid and John McGinley
2012	St Eunan's	1–7	Naomh Conaill	0–9	Mick Martin	Dara Gallagher	Eamon O'Boyle
2013	Glenswilly	3–19	Na Cealla Beaga	2–6	James Pat McDaid	Michael Murphy	Gary McDaid
2014	St Eunan's	0–9	Glenswilly	0–6	Rory Kavanagh	John Haran	Maxi Curran
2015	Naomh Conaill	0–11	St Eunan's	0–10	Leo McLoone	Leo McLoone	Martin Regan
2016	Glenswilly	1–10	Cill Chartha	0–12	Gary McFadden	Michael Murphy	Michael Canning
2017	Cill Chartha	0–7	Naomh Conaill	0–4	Patrick McBrearty	Mark McHugh	Barry Doherty
2018	Gaoth Dobhair	0–17	Naomh Conaill	1–7	Niall Friel	Odhrán Mac Niallais	Mervyn O'Donnell
2019	Naomh Conaill	0–8, 1–11 (r), 0-8 (2r)	Gaoth Dobhair	0–8, 0–14 (r), 0-7 (2r)	Ciarán Thompson	Ethan O'Donnell	Martin Regan
2020	Naomh Conaill	2-7 (aet; won 4–2 on penalties)	Cill Chartha	0–13 (aet; lost 4–2 on penalties)	Ciarán Thompson	Ciarán Thompson	Martin Regan
2021	St Eunan's	1–11	Naomh Conaill	0–4	Niall O'Donnell	Shane O'Donnell	Rory Kavanagh
2022	Naomh Conaill	1–9	St Eunan's	2–5	Kevin McGettigan	Ciarán Thompson	Martin Regan
2023	Naomh Conaill	1–16	Gaoth Dobhair	1–8	Ultan Doherty	Ethan O'Donnell	Martin Regan
2024	St Eunan's	1–13	An Clochán Liath	1–10	Kieran Tobin	Conor O'Donnell Jnr	Barry Meehan
2025	Naomh Conaill	2–18 (aet)	Gaoth Dobhair	1–19 (aet)	John O'Malley		Martin Regan
2026	St Eunan's	1–16	Naomh Conaill	1–15	Conor O'Donnell Snr		Kieran Donnelly

== Media coverage ==
=== Domestic ===
Matches are covered live throughout the county on Highland Radio.

Some matches are also covered by Ocean FM (if they involve teams from its area) alongside its coverage of sport in the neighbouring counties of Sligo and Leitrim.

Newspapers such as the Donegal Democrat and Donegal News provide extensive coverage of the competition.

=== Abroad ===
Live matches from the competition have been shown on Irish-language national television service TG4 as part of its GAA Beo programme. Highlights have been shown on the GAA... programme on Monday evenings on the same channel.

RTÉ began showing the Donegal SFC to English-language viewers on television in 2019.

With interest in the sport at an all-time high following the county's showing in the 2012 All-Ireland Senior Football Championship final, the final of the 2012 Donegal SFC was broadcast live on TG4.

Coverage of the final may be found in newspapers such as The Irish Times, Irish Examiner and Irish Independent the following day.

== Gradam Shéamuis Mhic Géidigh ==
A player of the year award has been given since 2016. Its title commemorates the RTÉ Raidió na Gaeltachta broadcaster Séamus Mac Géidigh. A committee of sports journalists decides the winner.

It is carved to resemble Errigal. It is made from Donegal granite. It has an engraving of Séamus Mac Géidigh on its front.

Year	Player	Club
2016	Michael Murphy	Glenswilly
2017	Mark McHugh	Cill Chartha
2018	Odhrán Mac Niallais	Gaoth Dobhair
2019	Ciarán Thompson	Naomh Conaill
2020 (Note: No Gradam Shéamuis Mhic Géidigh was given in 2020, due to the impact of the COVID-19 pandemic on Gaelic games.)	—N/a	—N/a
2021	Caolan Ward	St Eunan's
2022	Brendan McDyer	Naomh Conaill
2023	Oisín Gallen	Seán Mac Cumhaills
2024	Shane O'Donnell	St Eunan's
