= Michael Oliver McIntyre =

Gaelic footballer

Michael Oliver McIntyre was a Gaelic footballer who played with Donegal. He was tipped to become Donegal manager in 2002, having managed the Under 21s, trained the senior team when Declan Bonner first took over then acting as a selector when Mickey Moran was in charge. When he withdrew Brian McEniff took the job instead. McIntyre lived in Paris for a while then he died.
