= Pauric McShea =

Irish Gaelic footballer

Sport
- Sport: Gaelic football
- Position: Full-back
Club
- Years: Club
- 19??–19??: Aodh Ruadh
Inter-county
- Years: County
- 196?–19??: Donegal
- Ulster titles: 2

Pauric McShea is an Irish Gaelic football pundit and former player for Aodh Ruadh and the Donegal county team. He works as a match analyst for Ocean FM. He also writes a weekly column, "McShea's Say", for the Donegal Post.

He played at full-back.

He had a high-scoring game against Armagh in the 1967 All-Ireland Senior Football Championship.

He was part of the final team as Donegal won the 1972 Ulster Senior Football Championship. Then he captained Donegal to the 1974 Ulster Senior Football Championship.

His mother is from County Tyrone.

Close to Brian McEniff, McShea was part of the backroom team in 1992. He was seen on TV on his walkie-talkie keeping in touch with the Donegal selectors during the 1992 All-Ireland Senior Football Championship Final. McShea was also winning coach of the 1996 Donegal Senior Football Championship. He sought to succeed P. J. McGowan as Donegal manager in 1997 but withdrew and Declan Bonner became manager.

In May 2012, the Irish Independent named him in its selection of Donegal's "greatest team" spanning the previous 50 years.
