= 1998 International Rules Series =

- Event: International Rules Series
Ireland	Australia
128	118
- Ireland win series 128–118 on aggregate

First test
Ireland	Australia
61	62
- Date: 11 October 1998
- Venue: Croke Park, Dublin, County Dublin
- Referee: Mick Curley (Ireland); Andrew Coates (Australia)
- Attendance: 22,900

Second test
Australia	Ireland
56	67
- Date: 18 October 1998
- Venue: Croke Park, Dublin, County Dublin
- Referee: Mick Curley (Ireland); Andrew Coates (Australia)
- Attendance: 35,221

The 1998 International Rules Series was the fifth annual series between Gaelic footballers from the Gaelic Athletic Association and Australian rules footballers from the Australian Football League and the first since it was cancelled in 1990. It was part of a four-year agreement. Ireland and Australia both won a game however Ireland won the overall series by 10 points in aggregate. Jim Stynes who had represented Australia in the 1987 series and Ireland in the 1990 series, returned to represent Australia in the 1998 series while his brother, Brian played on the Irish team.

== Results ==
Both tests were played at GAA Headquarters (Croke Park in Dublin). The total series attendance was 58,121.

Sources for the following details: Footy Stats
Source for scores in the second test: International Rules Gold (TG4)

=== First test ===
Team	1	2	3	4	Total
Ireland	0.5.4 (19)	1.9.6 (39)	2.11.9 (54)	2.13.10	(61)
Australia	0.2.2 (8)	0.8.4 (28)	0.11.8 (41)	2.13.11	(62)
Australia won by 1 point

Date	Sunday, 11 October 1998
Scoring (IRL)	Goals: McCabe, Donnellan Overs: Stynes 4, Canavan 3, McCabe 2, Foley 2, Donnellan, Fallon
Scoring (AUS)	Goals: Neitz, Eagleton Overs: Carey 4, Lloyd 4, Neitz, Everitt, Camporeale, Farmer, Crawford
Best	IRL: McCabe, McDermott, B. Stynes, Canavan AUS: Buckley, Smith, Carey, Neitz, Silvagni
Injuries	Nil
Venue	Croke Park, Dublin, Ireland
Attendance	22,900
Referees / Umpires	Mick Curley (Ireland); Andrew Coates (Australia)
Match report

=== Second test ===
Team	1	2	3	4	Total
Ireland	0.6.2 (20)	2.7.4 (37)	4.9.7 (58)	4.12.7	(67)
Australia	1.1.1 (10)	2.6.6 (36)	2.8.10 (46)	2.10.14	(56)
Ireland won by 11 points

Date	Sunday, 11 October 1998
Scoring (IRL)	Goals: Canavan, Fallon, de Paor, Donnellan Overs: Canavan 3, Fallon 2, Stynes 2, Daly, Cavlan, Kenny, Lockhart, Tohill
Scoring (AUS)	Goals: Harvey, Camporeale Overs: Holland 2, Eagleton 2, Ricciuto 2, Buckley, Stevens, Lloyd, Stynes
Best	IRL: Canavan, McDermott, Fallon, Donnellan, McConnell AUS: Hart, Holland, Buckley, Carey, Ricciuto, Silvagni, Wellman
Injuries	Nil
Venue	Croke Park, Dublin, Ireland
Attendance	35,221
Referees / Umpires	Mick Curley (Ireland); Andrew Coates (Australia)
Match report

== Squads ==
Source: Official Series match-day programme

Ireland				Australia			
Num.	Name	Team	Position	Num.	Name	Team	Position
N/A	Colm O'Rourke	Meath	Manager	N/A	Leigh Matthews	N/A	Head coach
1	Finbarr McConnell	Tyrone	Goalkeeper	1	Stephen Silvagni	Carlton	Goalkeeper
2	Peter Canavan	Tyrone	Vice Captain	2	Nick Holland	Hawthorn	
3	Kieran McGeeney	Armagh		3	Matthew Lloyd	Essendon	
4	Diarmaid Marsden	Armagh		5	Nathan Buckley	Collingwood	
5	Anthony Tohill	Derry		6	Sean Wellman	Essendon	
6	Seán Marty Lockhart	Derry		8	Anthony Stevens	North Melbourne	
7	Brendan Devenney	Donegal		9	Shane Crawford	Hawthorn	
8	Paul Brewster	Fermanagh		10	Peter Everitt	St Kilda	
9	Dermot McCabe	Cavan		11	Jim Stynes	Melbourne	
10	Darren Fay	Meath		12	Todd Viney	Melbourne	
11	James Nallen	Mayo		14	Nathan Eagleton	Port Adelaide	
12	Colm Parkinson	Laois		15	David Neitz	Melbourne	
13	Derry Foley	Tipperary		16	Scott Camporeale	Carlton	
14	Finbar Cullen	Offaly		17	Nigel Smart	Adelaide	
15	John Kenny	Offaly		18	Wayne Carey	North Melbourne	Captain
16	Brian Stynes	Dublin		19	Rohan Smith	Western Bulldogs	
17	Séamus Moynihan	Kerry		20	Jeff Farmer	Melbourne	
18	John McDermott	Meath	Captain	21	Shaun Rehn	Adelaide	
19	Jarlath Fallon	Galway		22	Wayne Campbell	Richmond	
20	Michael Donnellan	Galway		24	Brad Johnson	Western Bulldogs	
21	Niall Buckley	Kildare		32	Mark Ricciuto	Adelaide	
22	Seán Óg de Paor	Galway		34	Ben Hart	Adelaide	
23	Colm McManaman	Mayo		35	Robert Harvey	St Kilda	
24	Glenn Ryan	Kildare					
25	Kevin O'Brien	Wicklow					
26	Martin Daly	Clare					
27	Jim McGuinness	Donegal					
28	Eoin Gormley	Tyrone					
29	Gerard Cavlan	Tyrone					
30	Kevin Walsh	Galway					
31	Seán Ó Domhnaill	Galway					
	Michael Magill	Down	Standby				
	Damien Donlon	Roscommon	Standby				

Jim Stynes Medal – Stephen Silvagni

== See also ==
- International rules football
- Gaelic football
- Australian rules football
- Comparison of Australian rules football and Gaelic football
