= Brian McEniff =

Irish Gaelic footballer & manager (born 1942)

Personal information
- Born: 1 December 1942 (age 83) Bundoran, County Donegal, Ireland
- Occupation: Hotelier

Sport
- Sport: Gaelic football
- Position: Wing-back
Clubs
- Years: Club
- 196?–197? 197?–19??: St Joseph's; Réalt na Mara
Club titles
- Donegal titles: 8
Inter-county
- Years: County
- 19??–197?: Donegal
Inter-county titles
- Ulster titles: 2
- All Stars: 1
Inter-county management
- Years: Team
- 1972–1975 1976–1977 1980–1986 1989–1994 2003–2005: Donegal; Donegal; Donegal; Donegal; Donegal
Inter-county titles as manager
County	League	Province	All-Ireland
Donegal	1	5	5

Brian McEniff (born 1 December 1942) is a former Gaelic football player, manager and administrator.

McEniff played as a wing-back for the St Joseph's combination of clubs from Bundoran and Ballyshannon. He won seven Donegal Senior Football Championship titles with that combination of clubs and another one with Réalt na Mara, when St Joseph's divided. He won two Ulster Senior Football Championship titles with the Donegal county team as player-manager in 1972 and 1974 and was awarded an All Star after the first of these. He returned to manage the county to a third Ulster SFC title in 1983, then left again. He returned once more in 1989, leading the county to its fourth and fifth Ulster SFC titles in 1990 and 1992, as well as the All-Ireland Senior Football Championship in the last of these. After becoming chairman of the county board, McEniff was unable to find a manager so did the job himself for a final time, reaching the 2003 All-Ireland SFC semi-final in his last term as senior manager of the county team.

McEniff managed his county during four successive decades, earning a reputation as the dean of Donegal football. In July 1992, Hogan Stand described McEniff as "one of the most successful football gurus in modern-day GAA history" and he has been likened to a footballing Godfather-type figure. Until 2011, he was directly involved in each of his county's Ulster SFC and All-Ireland SFC title wins. That year, Jim McGuinness (whom McEniff had recommended for the under-21 managerial role the previous year) won the first of the post-McEniff Ulster SFC titles. Declan Bonner, who won his first Ulster SFC title as manager in 2018, also regards McEniff as a mentor. Both McGuinness and Bonner played under McEniff when McEniff was Donegal manager.

McEniff managed the Ulster provincial football team for many decades. He coached Ireland to victory over Australia in the 2001 International Rules Series, held at the Melbourne Cricket Ground and Football Park in Adelaide in October that year.

== Early life ==
McEniff was born on 1 December 1942. He was born in Bundoran, County Donegal.

His parents were Mr. John McEniff from Newbliss, County Monaghan, and Elizabeth Begley from Carrickmore, County Tyrone. They were married in Bundoran in 1935. McEniff has three brothers: P. J. McEniff (retired dentist), Sean McEniff (Donegal County Councillor) and Liam McEniff (doctor), and one sister, Mary McGlynn (retired hotel accountant).

He spent much of his childhood in Carrickmore, where his mother's family had a farmhouse.

He attended a boarding school in County Monaghan.

From the age of 17, McEniff spent three years studying hotel management at Cathal Burgha Street College in Dublin.

McEniff left Ireland for Canada in 1962 to gain hotel work experience. It was in 1966 that he came back to Ireland.

== Playing career ==
McEniff supported Tyrone against Louth in the 1957 All-Ireland Senior Football Championship semi-final, his first visit to Croke Park.

After returning from Canada in the mid-1960s, McEniff took up an interest in playing the sport.

His position was in defence as a wing-back.

McEniff won numerous titles with the famous St Joseph's combination of Bundoran and Ballyshannon, both in Donegal and Ulster. He won Donegal Senior Football Championship titles with St Joseph's in 1965, 1968, 1970, 1973, 1974, 1975 and 1976. He won his last Donegal SFC title with Réalt na Mara in 1979, which included the late Brendan McHugh and Seamus Reilly, both county representatives for Sligo, Mayo and Donegal. He captained St Joseph's to the 1968 Ulster Senior Club Football Championship final.

He continued working to promote his club long into retirement. He managed them as recently as 2013.

McEniff was player-manager of the first Donegal team to win an Ulster Senior Football Championship title in 1972. He received an All Star award in 1972.

He was also player–manager of the 1974 Ulster SFC winning team. He was wing-back in the final as Donegal defeated Down.

== Management career ==
In 1975, the Donegal County Board ousted McEniff as manager.

In 1975, he assisted as a mentor the Sligo county team that won that county's second Connacht Senior Football Championship title. Upon being made aware that he would be taking charge of Sligo's training sessions, Barnes Murphy, the team captain, talked to McEniff. Murphy brought McEniff to Croke Park for the 1975 All-Ireland Senior Football Championship semi-final against Kerry ("although some of our friends in Sligo weren't too happy about that", Murphy told The Irish Times in 2007). McEniff, according to Murphy, could not provide advice to the team at half-time: "And I can tell you why, because they [Murphy had also brought along John "Tull" Dunne] were snubbed. They wanted to make a few changes, and I was wondering where these men where, to give us some advice". Sligo were routed by The Kingdom, 3–13 to 0–5.

"Brian was a colossus in Donegal football because he was forward thinking. He would have united the clubs in Donegal, who at that point would have been killing one another, even at county level players wouldn't pass. There was no rapport or bonding or anything like that, but Brian worked on that. He got the players together, he really was very skilled at man management, he brought the group together".

— Paul McGettigan on McEniff's managerial philosophy

He later returned as Donegal manager, for the first time as a non-playing member of the team. He was manager in 1977. He was manager again by late 1982. He led Donegal to a third Ulster SFC title in 1983. They narrowly lost to Galway in the 1983 All-Ireland Senior Football Championship semi-final.

He left again.

He began to manage the Ulster provincial football team, with which he won 12 Railway Cup finals. He managed Ulster for 23 years, until 2008. He managed them from 1983 to 2007. McEniff stood down from his position as Ulster manager in 2007, 25 years after taking the job in 1982. He woon 14 titles.

He helped Tyrone club Carrickmore, where his mother was from, when they were struggling against relegation in 1983 and 1986.

McEniff returned as Donegal manager in 1989, succeeding Tom Conaghan. He led the county to another Ulster SFC title in 1990, restoring such as Declan Bonner, Manus Boyle, Matt Gallagher, Barry McGowan and Sylvester Maguire, players that Conaghan had thrown by the wayside. McEniff's success in Gaelic games culminated when he led his native Donegal team to glory over Dublin at Croke Park in the 1992 All-Ireland Senior Football Championship final. It was shortly before this match that McEniff was informed that the brother of one of his players Joyce McMullin, had died from cancer. He chose not to inform McMullin or anyone else on the team until after the match. McEniff later described it as follows: "Everything had gone so smoothly but when I heard that I was knocked for six. Luckily, the lads were outside watching a bit of the minor match. I stamped up and down before deciding that Gerard would have wanted Joyce to play. When the team came back, they could see something was wrong with me, but I managed to hold it together". It later emerged that there had been a miscommunication and that McMullin's brother had not died. He did so a year later.

McEniff resigned on 26 June 1994 and was succeeded by P. J. McGowan the following month.

McEniff managed Ireland for the International Rules Series of 2000 and 2001. Ireland won 2001's first test, held at the Melbourne Cricket Ground on 12 October, by a scoreline of 59–53 and the second test, held at Football Park in Adelaide on 19 October, by a scoreline of 71–52. McEniff departed as Ireland manager in 2001.

"Brian never let any negative vibes creep under your door. When we won, it was what we expected. The word 'defeat' was never mentioned in our group".

— Declan Bonner on McEniff's managerial philosophy

He soon returned for a last outing as Donegal manager. He was chairman of the Donegal County Board in late 2002, but could not find a manager, so he did it himself. McGowan, Michael Oliver McIntyre and Anthony Harkin were part of his backroom team. In 2003, he led Donegal to the All-Ireland SFC semi-final. This was the last occasion on which they would achieve this feat until the time of the legendary Jim McGuinness. McEniff left Donegal inter-county management in 2005 after a fifth and final tenure in charge ended with a drab qualifier defeat to Cavan at Breffni Park. During his final time as manager, McEniff called such players as Neil Gallagher, Rory Kavanagh, Karl Lacey and Eamon McGee into the senior county team for the first time, in late 2003.

McEniff was mentor to Nell McCafferty on the Celebrity Bainisteoir television programme in 2007.

In 2010 and 2011, McEniff assisted Louth manager Peter Fitzpatrick in an advisory capacity, during which time Louth reached the 2010 Leinster Senior Football Championship final. In November that year, it was widely reported that he would become one of Fitzpatrick's selectors for the following season, with both Highland Radio and Hogan Stand claiming he would replace the departing Martin McQuillan. McEniff later denied this, though Louth County Board chairman Padraic O'Connor said McEniff would be a "great capture" and would not be paid.

McEniff managed his local club in the 2013 Donegal Senior Football Championship, taking over from Joe Keeney after his resignation and filling the position in his 71st year.

McEniff guided both Jim McGuinness and Declan Bonner, his most noteworthy successors as Donegal manager, into management.

=== Management style ===
Personal connections formed a critical part of McEniff's management style, so much so that when Declan Bonner brought his wife to Austria on their honeymoon McEniff maintained regular contact.

== Other ventures ==
Involved in Gaelic games administration in County Donegal, McEniff also spent time as Donegal's GAA Central Council delegate. He served on national Gaelic games committees. He has also been a referee. He is managing director of the McEniff Hotel Group, which has a presence in such locations as Bundoran, Drumcondra, Sligo, Rosses Point and Westport, County Mayo. Its portfolio includes the Holyrood Hotel (originally bought by his father John in 1951) and the Great Northern Hotel & Golf links (bought from CIÉ in 1977 by Brian and Sean McEniff and Brian's brother-in-law Michael Burke for £125,000). In 1969, McEniff bought the Hamilton Hotel, which was next door to the Holyrood Hotel.

On 7 June 1979, McEniff was elected onto Donegal County Council in lieu of his older brother Sean McEniff. Even though his father was a strong Fine Gael supporter, his mother was a supporter of Fianna Fáil.

He was appointed to the board of Ireland West Airport in 2002.

As of 2022, McEniff remained chairman of the CLG Réalt na Mara club.

== Personal life ==
McEniff is married to Catherine "Cautie" O'Leary, a native of Cork whom he met in Canada and married her there.

=== Health ===
In later life McEniff developed a bad back. During his appearance on Up for the Match ahead of the 2012 All-Ireland Senior Football Championship final, McEniff was visibly stiff, awkward and in some pain. One day after undergoing surgery on his back, he attended the 2012 All Stars Awards in Dublin—at which All-Ireland SFC champions Donegal received eight places out of a possible fifteen on the All Stars Team of the Year and Karl Lacey was named All Stars Footballer of the Year—saying "I wouldn't miss this for the world."

A pianist, he had a heart attack in late 2021.

== Honours ==
Player

- Ulster Senior Football Championship: 1972, 1974
- Donegal Senior Football Championship: 1965, 1968, 1970, 1973, 1974, 1975, 1976, 1979

Manager

- All-Ireland Senior Football Championship: 1992
- Ulster Senior Football Championship: 1972, 1974, 1983, 1990, 1992
- Railway Cup: 1983, 1984, 1989, 1991, 1992, 1993, 1994, 1998, 2000, 2003, 2004, 2007
- International Rules Series: 2001

Individual

- All Star: 1972
- In August 2011, McEniff was inducted into the MBNA Kick Fada Hall of Fame at a ceremony in Croke Park.
- In May 2012, the Irish Independent named him in its selection of Donegal's "greatest team" spanning the previous 50 years.
- In 2017, the Gaelic Players Association (GPA) chose McEniff and Kilkenny hurler Eddie Keher as its recipients of lifetime achievement awards.
- In January 2018, McEniff was inducted into the Donegal Sports Star Awards' Hall of Fame, with Donegal Sports Star Awards chairman Neil Martin quoted as saying: "As a committee we were unanimous when the name of Brian McEniff was proposed for 2017 Hall of Fame".
- On 19 April 2018, McEniff was presented with an All-Ireland Lifetime Achievement Award at the All-Ireland Business Summit.
- In February 2019, McEniff was honoured with a gala dinner at the Mount Errigal Hotel, attended by GAA president John Horan.
- In May 2020, the Belfast Telegraph named him as one of the "inspirational quartet" who would feature on Ulster GAA's Mount Rushmore.
- GAA Writers' Hall of Fame Award, received in May 2022, alongside Len Gaynor, who received the equivalent in hurling

Achievements
Preceded by Pete McGrath	All-Ireland SFC-winning manager 1992	Succeeded by Eamonn Coleman

Sporting positions
Preceded by ?	Donegal Senior Football Manager; 1972–1975	Succeeded by John Hannigan
Preceded by John Hannigan	Donegal Senior Football Manager; 1976–1977	Succeeded by Sean O'Donnell
Preceded by Sean O'Donnell	Donegal Senior Football Manager; 1980–1986	Succeeded by Tom Conaghan
Preceded by Tom Conaghan	Donegal Senior Football Manager; 1989–1994	Succeeded by P. J. McGowan
Preceded by Mickey Moran	Donegal Senior Football Manager; 2003–2005	Succeeded by Brian McIver
Preceded by ?	Ulster Senior Football Manager; 1983–2007	Succeeded by Joe Kernan
