= Highland Radio =

Local radio station in County Donegal, Ireland

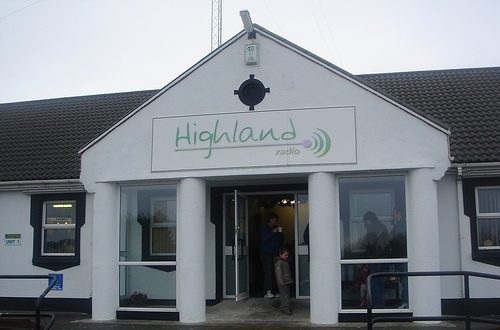

Ireland
- Broadcast area: Donegal North
- Frequencies: 103.3 MHz (Letterkenny), 95.2 MHz (Arranmore Island), 94.7 MHz (Ballybofey), 96.9 MHz (Ardara) and 87.9 MHz (Malin) + relays, Online

Programming
- Format: Adult contemporary

Ownership
- Owner: Orangold

History
- First air date: 15 March 1990

Links
- Website: highlandradio.com

Highland Radio is a local radio service in County Donegal in Ireland. Operating under a licence from the Broadcasting Authority of Ireland (BAI), Highland Radio has multiple frequencies. The station began broadcasting on 15 March 1990.

Headquartered at the Mountain Top in Letterkenny, Highland broadcasts throughout large parts of Ulster (especially West Ulster), with it being received in the nearby city of Derry and in much of the rest of County Londonderry, as well as in large parts of County Tyrone and County Fermanagh, and in parts of County Antrim. It has the highest market share of any local station within the Republic of Ireland.

== History ==
Highland began broadcasting on 15 March 1990.

On 31 May 2005, it was announced that the station was to be purchased by Scottish Radio Holdings for €7 million. However, SRH itself was acquired by Emap 21 days later. The deal was cleared by both the BCI and the Irish Competition Authority. Emap's sole changes to the station were increasing the bandwidth of their web streams from 20 kbit/s to 128 kbit/s, with no format or presenter changes.

Denis O'Brien's Communicorp was the highest bidder for Emap's Irish operations when that company decided to sell its radio stations, buying FM104, Highland Radio and Today FM on 14 July 2007. In October 2007, the Broadcasting Commission of Ireland (BCI) approved Communicorp's proposed takeover of Today FM and Highland Radio, but not FM104. The deal was completed by January 2008. Due to a Competition Authority decision, Communicorp was required to sell-on FM104, which it did (to UTV Media) immediately upon its acquisition. O'Brien offloaded Highland Radio in mid-2008.

Orangold, a company owned by the Rabbitt family, completed the purchase of Highland Radio from Denis O'Brien's Communicorp Group in July 2008. Gerry Rabbitt is a founder shareholder of Galway Bay FM and was managing director of Galway Bay FM for 10 years.

On 12 August 2012, Highland Radio received an international exclusive interview with Jamaican sprinter Usain Bolt live on air from the Summer Olympics in Stratford in London.

Charlie Collins quit as general manager in June 2013. Collins had also been "head of sport". Oisin Kelly succeeded Collins as "head of sport" the next day.

Pio McCann, who died in October 2020, was recognised for his interviews with American country music figures, including Johnny Cash, Dolly Parton, Kris Kristofferson, Charley Pride and Garth Brooks, and, notably, gave Daniel O'Donnell his first interview. He was part of the evening schedule at the station.

== News and sport ==
Highland Radio News airs their own bulletins Mondays to Fridays on the hour from 7.00am until 7.00pm. The news service gives coverage of local news and events from across the city of Derry and counties Donegal, Londonderry and Tyrone. There are three main extended news bulletins Mondays to Fridays at 8.30am, 1.00pm and 5.00pm. From 8.00pm until 12-midnight, Highland Radio airs hourly live news bulletins provided by Newstalk in Dublin.

Highland Radio News has a limited provision of local news over the weekend. Saturdays have local bulletins on the hour from 10.00am until 2.00pm. Newstalk provides news bulletins at 8.00am, 9.00am and then on the hour from 3.00pm until 12-midnight. On Sundays, Highland Radio provides local news from 1.00pm -6.00pm. Newstalk provides the rest of Sundays news output on the station on the hour from 8.00am until 12-midnight.

The station covers the main sporting events held in County Donegal, County Londonderry, and County Tyrone, as well as in the city of Derry. The station broadcasts the results of all major Irish League fixtures played in Northern Ireland, in addition to broadcasting the results of League of Ireland fixtures played in the Republic of Ireland.

During Christmas, Easter and Bank Holidays, Newstalk provide the only news bulletins on the hour.

== People ==
Notable current and former presenters at the station include:

- Declan Harvey
- Brendan Devenney
