= Aodh Ruadh CLG =

Donegal-based Gaelic games club

- Aodh Ruadh CLG
- Founded: 1909
- County: Donegal
- Nickname: The Ernesiders
- Colours: Green and White
- Grounds: Fr Tierney Park, Ballyshannon
- Coordinates: 54.497863°N 8.191321°W

Playing kits
Standard colours

Senior Club Championships
	All Ireland	Ulster champions	Donegal champions
Football:	-	-	12
Ladies' football:	–	–	1

Aodh Ruadh CLG is a GAA club based in the town of Ballyshannon in County Donegal.

Historically one of their county's most successful GAA clubs, it has won 12 Donegal Senior Football Championship titles, and currently competes in Division 1 of the league and the Senior Championship.

The club colours are green and white and it plays its home games at Fr Tierney Park.

The club has a local rivalry with Réalt na Mara.

== History ==
Aodh Ruadh was founded in 1909 as a football and hurling club. It is named after nobleman Hugh Roe O'Donnell (Irish: Aodh Ruadh Ó Domhnaill).

Fr Tierney Park opened officially in 1954.

Jim "Natch" Gallagher was mentor to Donegal's 1972 and 1974 Ulster Senior Football Championship-winning teams.

With Bundoran, Aodh Ruadh formed one half of the St Joseph's team that won seven Donegal SFC titles and an Ulster Club SFC—the only Donegal team to achieve this feat until Gaoth Dobhair in 2018. Aodh Ruadh also contributed three players to Donegal's 1992 All-Ireland SFC title win: Brian Murray, Gary Walsh and Sylvester Maguire.

In 2011, Aodh Ruadh created history by electing an all-female executive consisting of: Betty McIntyre, Chair, Emma Gaughan, Secretary, and Catherine McKee, Treasurer.

== Notable players ==
Football

- Peter Boyle — 2010 Ulster Under-21 FC winner and 2010 All-Ireland Under-21 FC finalist
- Martin Carney — 1972 and 1974 Ulster SFC winner; 1973 Railway Cup winner; Donegal Team of the Millennium
- John Duffy
- Matt Gallagher — 1982 All-Ireland Under-21 FC winner; 1992 All-Ireland SFC winner; 1992 All-Star
- Alan Kane — 1972 and 1974 Ulster SFC winner
- Niall McCready — 1995 Ulster Under-21 FC winner
- Pauric McShea — 1966 Ulster Under-21 FC winner; 1972 Ulster SFC winner; 1974 Ulster SFC winning captain; Donegal Team of the Millennium
- Sylvester Maguire — 1992 Sigerson Cup and All-Ireland SFC winner
- Brian Murray — 1992 All-Ireland SFC winner; 1994 and 1995 Railway Cup winner
- Brian Roper — 1995 Ulster Under-21 FC winner; 2007 National Football League winner
- Brian Tuohy — All-Ireland Under-21 FC winner and captain of the first All-Ireland winning team in Donegal's history
- Gary Walsh — 1991 Railway Cup winner; 1992 All-Ireland SFC winner; 1992 All-Star

Hurling

- Jamie Brennan — 2018 and 2019 Ulster SFC winner
- Sylvester Maguire — 1989 Ulster JHC winner

== Managers ==
Years	Manager
1909–20??	—N/a
c. 2006c.	P. J. McGowan
c. 2007	Peter Gallagher
c. 2007–2012?	
2012–2014	Maurice McLaughlin
c.c. 2015	Packie McGrath
2016–c. 2018	Peter Gallagher and James O'Donnell
c. 2019–c. 2021	Barry Ward
2022–2023	John McNulty
2024	Conor Cunningham
2024	Maurice McLaughlin
2024–	Jimmy Langan

== Honours ==
- Donegal Senior Football Championship: 1929, 1932, 1937, 1939, 1942, 1943, 1951, 1986, 1987, 1994, 1997, 1998
- Donegal Division 1 Football League: 1930, 1941, 1944, 1945, 1947, 1955, 1997
- Donegal Division 2 Football League: 2017, 2021
- Donegal Division 3 Football League: 2016
- Donegal Division 4 Football League: 1982, 2007, 2008
- Donegal Intermediate Football Championship: 2020 **Runner-up: 2012, 2018
- Donegal Under-21 Football Championship: 1981, 1982, 1988, 1989, 1993
- Donegal Under-21 B Football Championship: 2013
- Ulster Minor Club Football Championship: 1992
- Donegal Minor Football Championship: 1935, 1936, 1937, 1961, 1963, 1979, 1980, 1981, 1982, 1988, 1990, 1992
- Donegal Minor Football League: 1980, 1982, 1986, 2012

== See also ==
- Hugh Roe O'Donnell
