= Sylvester Maguire =

Irish Gaelic footballer

Personal information
- Nickname: Sylvie
- Born: 1960s

Sport
- Sport: Gaelic football
Club
- Years: Club
- 19??–: Aodh Ruadh
Inter-county
- Years: County
- 19??–?: Donegal
Inter-county titles
- Ulster titles: 2
- All-Irelands: 1

Sylvester Maguire (born 1960s) is an Irish former Gaelic footballer who played for Aodh Ruadh and the Donegal county team.

He won the 1982 All-Ireland Under-21 Football Championship with Donegal.

He fell out with senior county manager Tom Conaghan during the 1980s. Brian McEniff restored him to the panel in time for the 1990 Ulster Senior Football Championship, which Donegal won.

He was a panellist on the day of the 1992 All-Ireland Senior Football Championship Final but did not play. He was seen exercising in apparent readiness to enter the field of play but, according to fellow substitute Tommy Ryan, speaking to the Sunday Independent in 2021: "There was an incident that happened and there were a few words exchanged on the sideline, and then nobody got on".

He won an Ulster Junior Hurling Championship in 1989.
