= Ballyshannon =

Town in County Donegal, Ireland

Ballyshannon Béal Átha Seanaidh
- Town
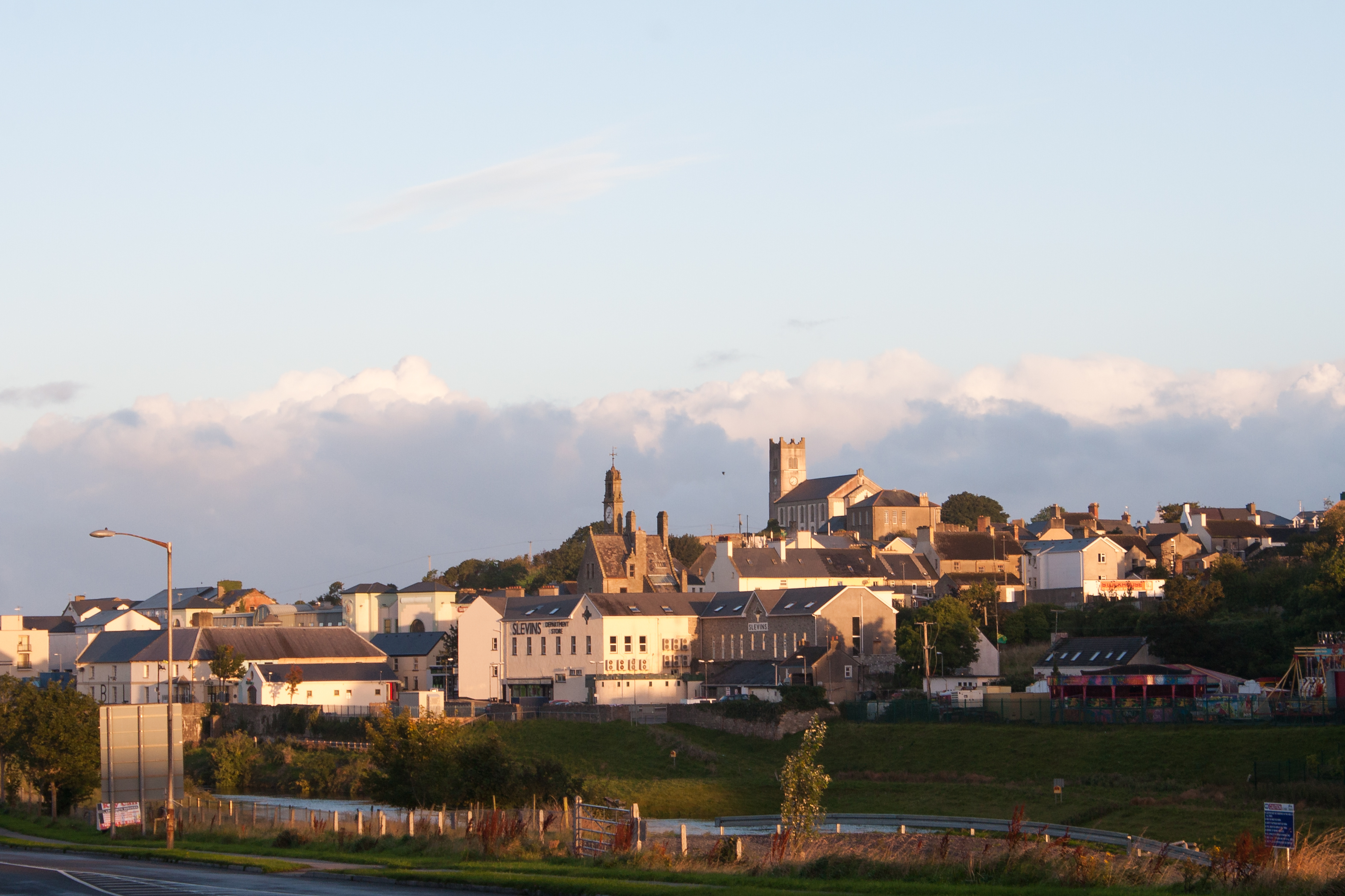
- Ballyshannon from the Belleek Road

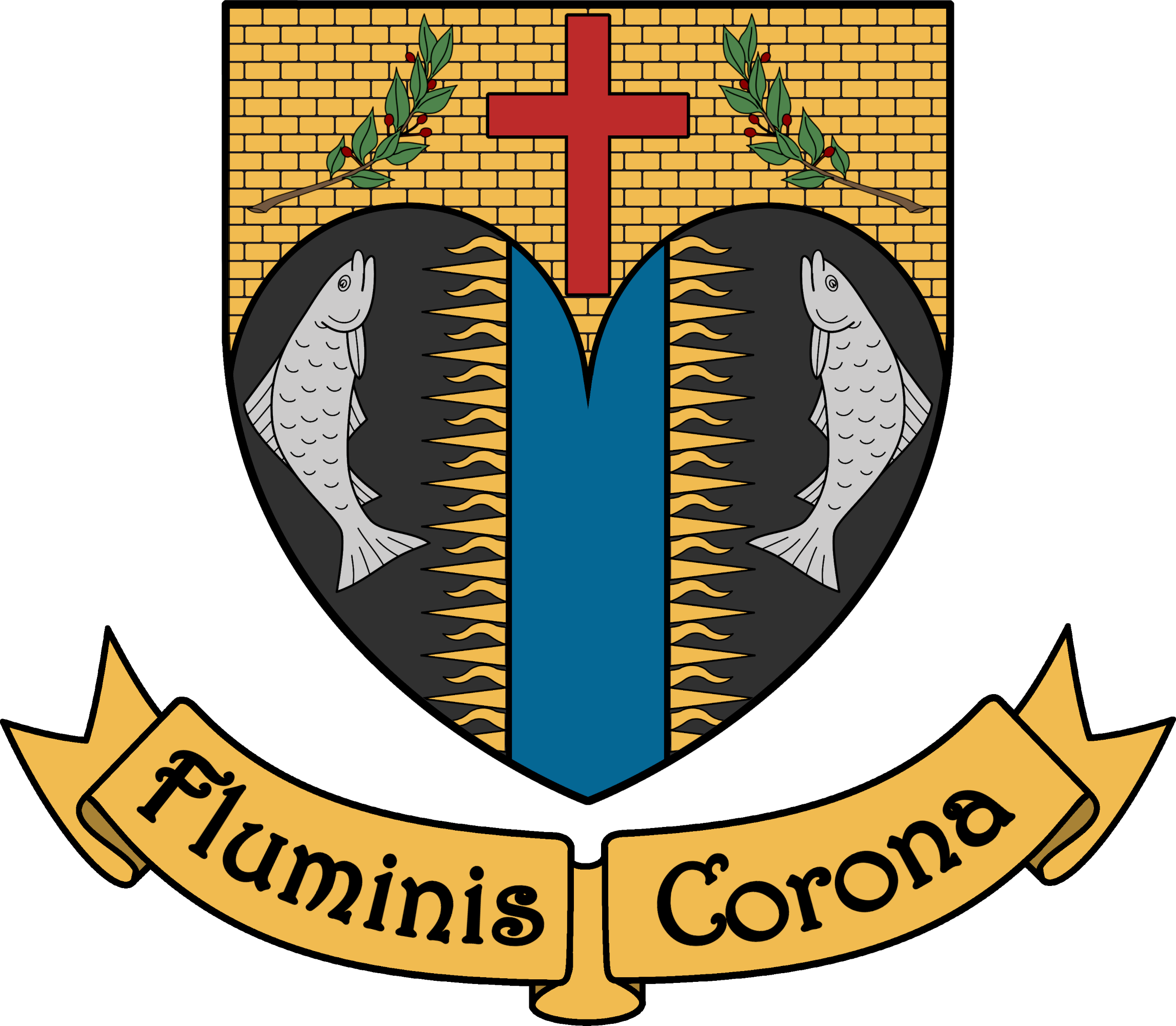
- Coat of arms
- Motto: Fluminis Corona (Crown of the River)
- Location in Ireland
- Coordinates: 54°30′05″N 8°11′24″W
- Country: Ireland
- County: County Donegal

Government
  - Dáil constituency: Sligo–Leitrim
  - EU Parliament: Midlands–North-West

Population (2022)
  - Total: 2,246
- Eircode routing key: F94
- Telephone area code: +353(0)71
- Irish Grid Reference: G876614

Historical population
Year	Pop.	±%
1821	3,831	—
1831	3,775	−1.5%
1841	3,513	−6.9%
1851	3,698	+5.3%
1861	3,197	−13.5%
1871	2,958	−7.5%
1881	2,840	−4.0%
1891	2,471	−13.0%
1901	2,359	−4.5%
1911	2,170	−8.0%
1926	2,112	−2.7%
1936	2,223	+5.3%
1946	2,514	+13.1%
1951	2,813	+11.9%
1956	2,434	−13.5%
1961	2,322	−4.6%
1966	2,233	−3.8%
1971	2,325	+4.1%
1981	3,066	+31.9%
1986	3,015	−1.7%
1991	2,838	−5.9%
1996	2,775	−2.2%
2002	2,715	−2.2%
2006	2,686	−1.1%
2011	2,503	−6.8%
2016	2,299	−8.2%
2022	2,246	−2.3%

Ballyshannon (Irish: Béal Átha Seanaidh, meaning 'the mouth of Seannach's ford') is a town in County Donegal, Ireland. It is located at the southern end of the county where the N3 from Dublin ends and the N15 crosses the River Erne. The town was incorporated in the early 17th century, receiving a town charter in March 1613.

== Location ==
Ballyshannon, which means "the mouth of Seannach's ford", after a fifth-century warrior, Seannach, who was reputedly slain there, lies at the mouth of the river Erne. Just west of the town, the Erne widens and its waters meander over a long sandy estuary. The northern bank of the river rises steeply away from the riverbank, while the southern bank is flat with a small cliff that runs parallel to the river. The town looks out over the estuary and has views of mountains, lakes and forests.

== History ==
Archaeological sites dating as far back as the Neolithic period (4000 BC – 2500 BC) have been excavated in Ballyshannon and surrounding areas, representing settlement and ritual activity from early periods of human settlement. Finds have ranged from fulachta fiadh (burnt mounds) dating from the Bronze Age (2500–500 BC), to a possible brushwood trackway thought to date to an earlier Neolithic period, through an early find of a pair of gold sun-discs from c. 2500–2150 BCE to the recent discovery of a previously unknown medieval church and cemetery containing hundreds of skeletons thought to date from between 1100 and 1400. This site yielded numerous artefacts including silver long cross pennies and halfpennies dating from the reign of Henry III (1251–1276) and Edward I (c. 1280–1302). Other finds included bone beads, shroud pins, and pieces of quartz which were found placed in the hands of many of the skeletons.

Other nearby sites include a Neolithic tomb, and the grave of Aed Ruad, High King of Ireland, upon which St. Anne's church (Church of Ireland) was supposedly built, occupying the highest of the town's vantage points—Mullgoose. Nothing remains to mark either tomb, the last vestige of the mound on Mullaghnashee having been obliterated in 1798 when a fort was constructed on the hill-top. The 18th-century churchyard and the paupers' burial ground were both referred to as Sidh Aedh Ruaidh, the Fairy Mound of Red Hugh. The 'sheeman' (Anglicisation of the Irish sidh) in Mullgoose means 'fairies'. Popular belief assigned the interior of hills to fairies' dwelling places and local tradition has handed down accounts of the exploits of the fairy folk, including among the Finner sand-hills and in the Wardtown district of Ballyshannon. In 1906, the hill-top at Mullgoose was excavated and found to contain subterranean chambers.

The Vikings, according to the Annals of Ulster, attacked nearby Inishmurray Island in 795. Later they used the River Erne to attack inland, burning Devenish Island monastery in 822. The annals also record that in 836, all the churches of Loch Erne, together with Cluain Eois (Clones) and Daimhinis (Devenish Island) were destroyed by the "gentiles". In 923 and 916 respectively, "a fleet of foreigners on Loch Erne plundered the islands of the lake", as well as the surrounding territories.

In March 1613, Ballyshannon was incorporated as a borough by James I. In 1775, the salmon-leap of Assaroe at Ballyshannon was praised by the traveller Richard Twiss in A Tour in Ireland:

The Giants Causeway is an object which is scarcely worthy of going so far to see; however that is to be determined by the degree of curiosity of which the traveller is possessed. But the salmon-leap at Ballyshannon is a scene of such a singular nature, as is not to be found elsewhere, and is as peculiar to Ireland as the bullfights are to Spain...

It was in Ballyshannon, around 1793, that Robert Stewart, 2nd Marquess of Londonderry, who would later become Chief Secretary for Ireland and British Foreign Secretary, had a vision of "the radiant boy". Stewart, who would later become Lord Castlereagh, was serving as a young British Army officer and MP for County Down in the Irish Parliament at the time. Lodging in the old Military Barracks in the town, he retired for the night. Looking into the fire, he reportedly saw the form of a boy emerge from the flames, grow larger and larger and vanish. "The radiant boy" is a common figure in English and Irish folklore, and is often supposed to foretell death. William Allingham later wrote a poem about the incident.

The Enniskillen and Bundoran Railway (E&BR) opened in 1868 and had a station at Ballyshannon. The Great Northern Railway (GNR) operated the E&BR line from 1876 and absorbed the company in 1896. The partition of Ireland in 1922 turned the boundary with County Fermanagh into an international frontier. Henceforth Ballyshannon's only railway link with the rest of the Irish Free State was via Northern Ireland, and as such was subject to delays for customs inspections. The Government of Northern Ireland closed much of the GNR network on its side of the border in 1957, including the E&BR as far as the border. This gave the Republic of Ireland no practical alternative but to allow the closure of the line through Ballyshannon between the border and Bundoran. Thereafter, the nearest railheads for Ballyshannon were Sligo in the Republic of Ireland and Omagh in Northern Ireland, until in 1965 the Ulster Transport Authority closed the line through Omagh as well.

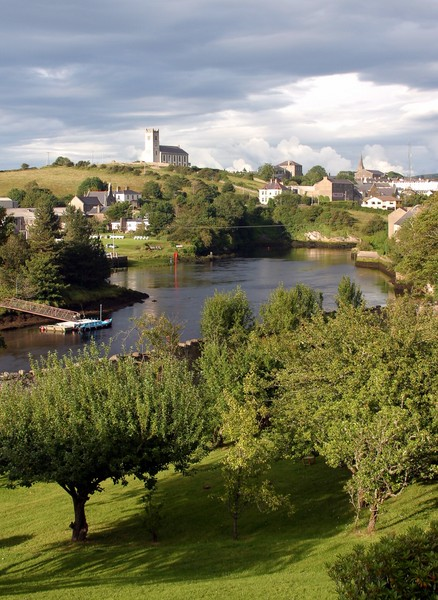
River Erne and Ballyshannon

A hydroelectric power station was built in the town in the 1950s. The project or "scheme" brought engineers, electricians, and specialists in hydroelectricity from many parts of the country and abroad to the town, which experienced a "boom" during the decade-long construction period. The scheme involved building a dam upriver from the town and digging out a deep channel or tailrace to lower the riverbed through the town to increase the head of water at the dam to drive the turbines. The new plant was named Cathaleen's Fall hydroelectric power station. Before the station was built, the river was wide, and the water level much higher than it is today. A long bridge spanned from the northern shore to the 'port' on the southern bank. The waters spilled over a number of waterfalls, among them Assaroe Falls, before meandering out to sea. Today, however, the river runs through a narrow channel, far below the level of either bank and a narrower single arch bridge has replaced the old one. The newly built Ballyshannon–Bundoran bypass has added a new, more modern bridge over the river. A pedestrian bridge was also constructed to mark the millennium.

During the Second World War, the British and Irish governments quietly reached an agreement to create an air corridor between nearby Belleek and Ballyshannon, the "Donegal Corridor", which was used by British Royal Air Force flights from Northern Ireland into the Atlantic Ocean. This was used by the aircraft which located the German battleship Bismarck.

== Festivals and culture ==
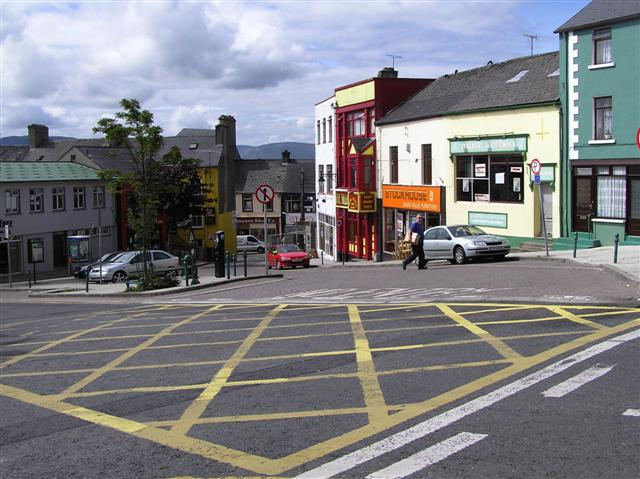
Town centre

The Rory Gallagher International Tribute Festival takes place in Ballyshannon on June Bank Holiday weekend.

Ballyshannon Folk Festival is an annual festival that takes place over the August bank holiday weekend. It is one of the longest-running folk and traditional festivals in the world.

Ballyshannon & District Museum is located on the second floor of Slevins Department Store in Ballyshannon. The museum, which opened in April 2013, has exhibitions on Rory Gallagher, the Battle of Ballyshannon (1598), the Great Famine and workhouse, the local fishing industry, sport, World Wars I and II, and the Donegal Railway.

== Transport ==
Bus routes from Ballyshannon, operated by Bus Éireann, serve Cavan, Dublin, Sligo and Galway. Ulsterbus also has services to Belfast and Derry in Northern Ireland. Feda ODonnell has routes to and from Gweedore to the west of Ireland, including Sligo and Galway, via Ballyshannon.

The nearest railway to Ballyshannon is at Sligo railway station which is served by trains to Dublin Connolly and is operated by Iarnród Éireann.

== Sport ==
The local Gaelic games club is Aodh Ruadh. Other local sports clubs include Ballyshannon RFC (rugby), Erne Wanderers (soccer) and the Eightyeighters (Basketball).

== Schools ==
There are a number of national (primary) schools serving the area. The local secondary school is Coláiste Cholmcille Secondary School.

== Notable people ==
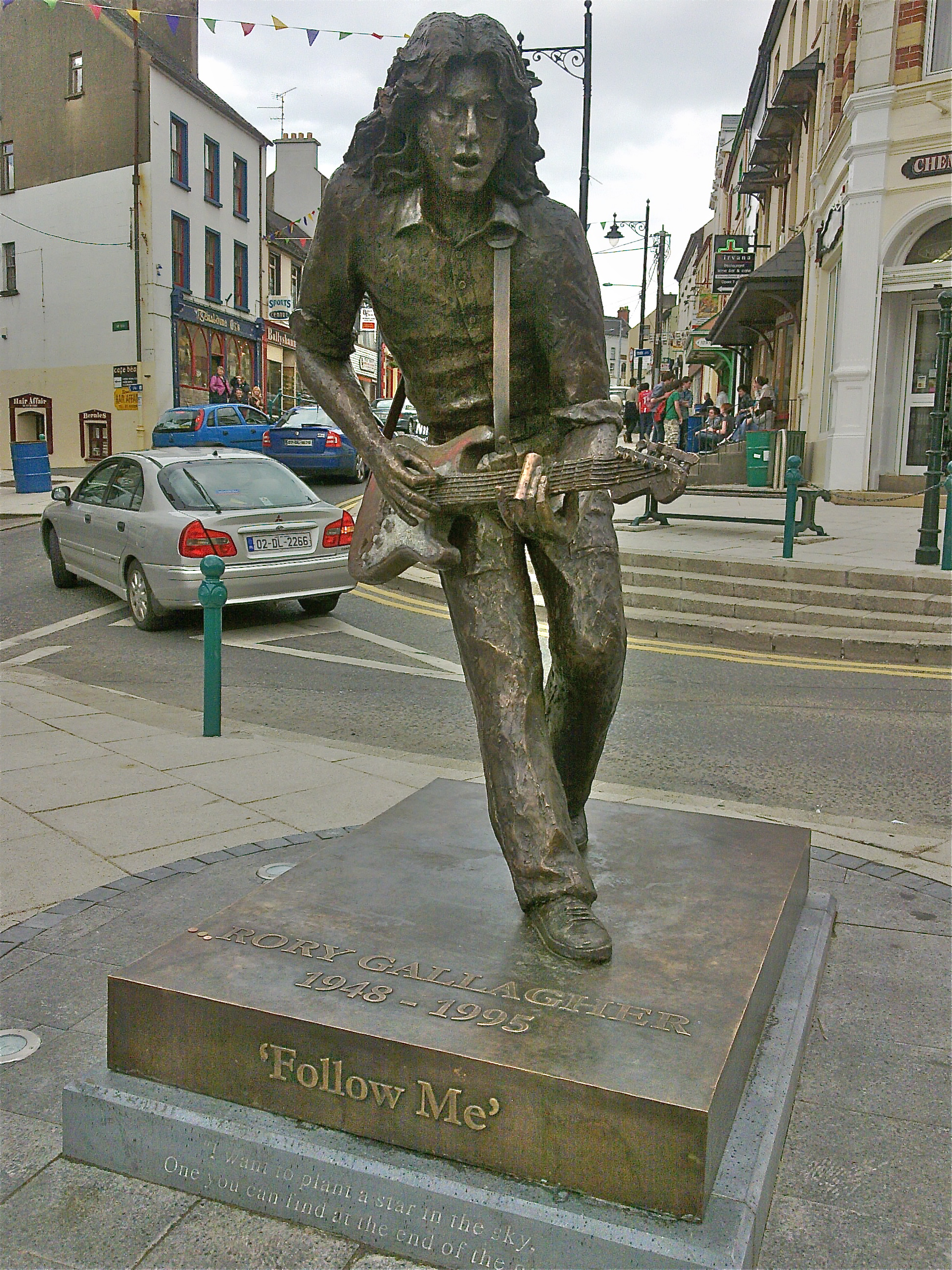
Statue of Ballyshannon native, musician Rory Gallagher

- William Allingham (1824–1889) – poet, diarist and editor
- John Barclay (1749–1824) – American politician; Mayor of Philadelphia
- Mark Boyle (born 1979) – social activist and writer, also known as the "Moneyless Man" for deliberately choosing to live without money since 2008 as he considers it harmful. Boyle also gave up technology in 2016 after deciding that it was also part of the same problem.
- Mary Boyle (born 1970) – disappeared 1977 (suspected murder victim)
- William Conolly (1662–1729) – politician, lawyer and landowner
- Rory Gallagher (1948–1995) – guitarist and singer; a statue erected in his memory is in the town centre
- Robert Johnston VC (1872–1950) – international (Ireland & Lions) rugby player; soldier
- Sylvester Maguire – Gaelic footballer
- Niall McCready – Gaelic footballer
- Charlie McGettigan (born 1950) – singer; Eurovision Song Contest winner
- Brian Murray (born 1963) – Gaelic footballer
- James Myles (1877–1956) – politician, soldier, buried in the town
- Mícheál Ó Cléirigh (1590–1643) – chief author of the Annals of the Four Masters
- Brian Roper (born 1974) – Gaelic footballer
- Corey Sheridan (born 2008) – Association footballer, Irish youth international
- Brian Tuohy – Gaelic footballer
- Gary Walsh – Gaelic footballer

== International relations ==
Ballyshannon is twinned with:

- Grenay, France
- Séné, France

== See also ==
- List of populated places in Ireland
- List of abbeys and priories in Ireland (County Donegal)
