= St Eunan's College =

Coordinates: 54.951737°N 7.745554°W

- Coláiste Naomh Adhamhnáin
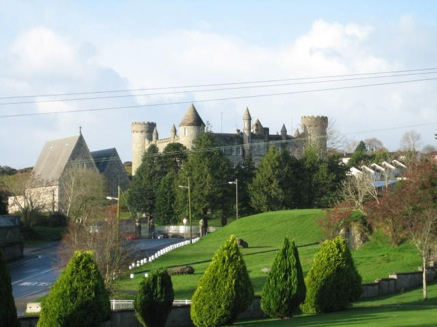
- A long view of St Eunan's College
- Sentry Hill, Letterkenny, County Donegal; Ireland

Information
- Type: Secondary school
- Motto: In hoc signo vinces (Latin for "in this sign you will conquer")
- Religious affiliation: Roman Catholic
- Established: 1906
- Founder: Bishop Patrick O'Donnell
- Principal: Damien McCroary
- Faculty: 100+
- Gender: Male
- Enrollment: 912 (2020–21)
- Language: English
- Colour
- Website: sainteunans.com

St Eunan's College (/ˈjuːnən/ YOO-nən; Irish: Coláiste Adhamhnáin), known locally as The College to distinguish it from the cathedral and GAA club, is a voluntary Roman Catholic all-male, English-medium secondary day school (and former boarding school) in County Donegal, Ireland. It is located upon Sentry Hill in Letterkenny. Named after Adomnán or Eunan (the Abbot of Iona who was native to Tír Chonaill, mainly modern County Donegal, and is patron saint of the Roman Catholic Diocese of Raphoe), the school's foundation stone was laid on the patron saint's feast day of 23 September.

Its buildings and grounds include the College Chapel, a medial courtyard and playing fields. Architectural features include four turreted round towers and flying buttresses which are modelled on the nearby Cathedral. Sporadic extensions have occurred, including during the early 1930s and the late 1970s – science laboratories and a demonstration room were added in between these two periods of major building work. A monkey puzzle tree grows on the front lawn close to the front door and the College Chapel. Those men who have attended the college are termed Old Adomnánians (/æðɒvˈnɔːnjæns/).

Sportsmen educated there include Olympic athletes, Mark English (a middle-distance runner) and Philip Deignan (a cyclist who later turned professional), as well as several current county footballers, among whom are Michael Murphy, Shaun Patton and Niall O'Donnell. Several members of Cabinet were educated here, including Pa O'Donnell, Neil Blaney and Jim McDaid. Others educated there include quiz player Pat Gibson (Who Wants to Be a Millionaire?, Mastermind, Brain of Britain, Mastermind Champion of Champions, Eggheads), actor Ray McAnally and lexicographer Niall Ó Dónaill.

The college has a tradition since its foundation of hosting musicals, operas, operettas and other performances. Its current principal is Damien McCroary. The All-Ireland-winning Gaelic footballer, Colm McFadden, serves as his deputy. Other staff members (past and present) include Ollie Horgan, Gary McDaid, Charlie McGeever, Caolan McGonagle, Caolan Ward and John Wilson, who later served as Tánaiste. It accommodates close to 1,000 students and increases its numbers year-on-year.

== History ==
=== Antecedent institutions: 1700s–1800s ===
Anthony Coyle, the first Bishop of Raphoe to take up residence in Letterkenny, established a classical academy during the eighteenth century. Then, in the following century, Bishop Patrick McGettigan appointed a priest as a teacher of Greek, Latin and mathematics at a building on Castle Street in 1825. The school was abandoned by the mid-1830s due to a priest shortage and a professor having died. A further school followed during the 1830s, close to the current college, though it too was short-lived, as was another school in the town during the 1840s.

In 1849, Bishop McGettigan approved the setting up of a school in the Literary Institute; this would become known as the "Old Seminary" and the "Latin School". This was the final school before the college was established and the longest lasting of its antecedents. Run independently for three decades, in 1879 the Bishop formally placed it under the management of the Catholic Church after the last of various doctors and other men, who had until then run the school, died prematurely. The recently ordained Edward Maguire, then aged 24, was appointed president. Maguire had, by the 1880s, been sent to Maynooth. Patrick McCaffery succeeded him as president; he, in his turn, was succeeded by P. J. Brennan in 1889. J. J. O'Doherty succeeded Brennan as president; O'Doherty then gave way to the last president of the Old Seminary, Hugh Gallagher.

As scholar numbers began to outgrow the facilities available at the Literary Institute, Bishop of Raphoe Patrick O'Donnell sought to establish a boarding school to provide a classical education. The college was established as a minor seminary to prepare young men for the priesthood of the Catholic Church. Diocesan colleges experienced an increasingly favoured stature at the time and were set up to give an unrivalled Catholic education to boys of every class. The college's motto, In hoc signo vinces, meaning "by this sign – (the Cross) – you shall conquer" is derived from the episcopal motto of O'Donnell.

=== Foundation, fire and the national grid: 1904–1944 ===
In 1904, the college's foundation stone was laid on the feast of St Eunan (23 September). Priests from the Roman Catholic Diocese of Raphoe gathered money from around the world for its erection. The college opened in September 1906, with Edward Maguire as its first president. Latin, Greek and history were taught. Maguire remained as president of the college until 1910 when he was sent to another parish.

Michael Ward succeeded Maguire as president; he had been at the college since its opening four years previously and served as president until his sudden death aged 41 in 1919. During The Rev Ward's Presidency, a student died in 1912 and there was a fire in the college.

Patrick D. McCaul became the third president of the college; he too had taught there since its opening but had been appointed to the cathedral parish in 1918, only to be brought back after Ward's death. McCaul's tenure, which lasted until he was sent to another parish in 1929, coincided with increased student registrations and made an extension to the college much needed. This was built in the early 1930s during the tenure of John Kerr, the only president of the college to succeed to the presidency without having been a member of the teaching staff — until, that is, the arrival of Christopher Darby from Ballyshannon's Coláiste Cholmcille in 2009. Kerr's tenure lasted until 1944, at which time he was sent to another part of the county. Kerr's presidency included the college's Silver Jubilee in 1931 and, like Ward before him and others later (Carney, McCroary), coincided with the death of a student; in this case he was brought to the district hospital in pain in October 1933, but died on 7 October. The same year (1933), the college was connected to the ESB national grid for the first time. Until that time, it had obtained electricity from a system McCaul had near the college's handball alleys.

=== Chapel, opera, telescope and playing field: 1944–1971 ===
Arthur McLoone was the college's fifth president and the first to have studied at the college (beginning in 1911). A classical scholar, he taught Latin and Greek, served as dean and as bursar and involved himself in the college's annual opera; he had a special fondness for the operettas of Gilbert and Sullivan. His ten-year presidency of the college is noted for the development of the first playing field opposite the college and the new College Chapel which was finished in 1952. He was noted for his administrative ability. Sent away to Killybegs in mid-1954,. McLoone's death came all of a sudden during celebrations for the college's Golden Jubilee in 1956.

Christopher Finnegan, sixth president of the college, was with its founder Cardinal O'Donnell on his death in 1927. He taught English, had been vice president of the college since 1944 and worked with McLoone in the staging of his beloved Gilbert and Sullivan operettas. A gifted preacher and eloquent orator, he oversaw the building of the Recreation Hall in 1958, before dying in office aged 61 in December 1960.

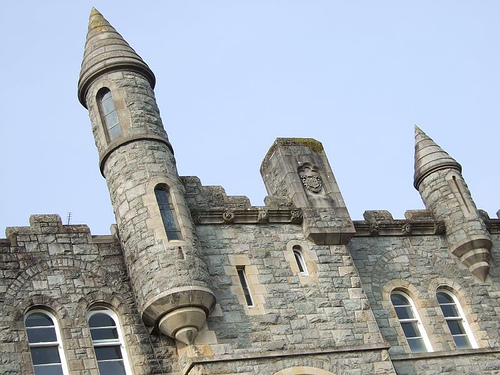
These examples of corbelled turrets are among the school's many impressive architectural features.

Daniel J. Cunnea (known as "The Doc"), seventh president of the college, was also educated there. After completing a doctorate and spending some time working at Knockbeg College, he joined the St Eunan's staff in 1942 as a teacher of science and mathematics. With Finnegan having just suddenly died, e Cunnea was propelled into the presidency in January 1961. Noted for his use of a telescope to study the night sky, he oversaw improvements in the college's science facilities, including two science laboratories and a demonstration room in 1964, before being sent to a remote village in another part of the county in 1969.

Peter McMahon, eighth president of the college, had, like his predecessor, been educated there and joined the staff in 1953, holding the posts of Dean and Bursar (just as McLoone had before him). McMahon was president for two years, bridging the gap between the 1960s and 1970s. Though sent to administer a nearby rural parish, he remained as a member of staff and taught mathematics at the college until 1981.

=== "Free education" and demise of boarding: 1971–present ===
Austin Laverty, ninth president of the college, had also studied there and, like McLoone and McMahon, held the posts of Dean and Bursar. Appointed to the presidency in 1971, he steered the college through the difficult years that followed the introduction of "free education" by Donogh O'Malley, who made the decision without consulting his colleagues in cabinet. With a growing population of children to be accommodated, the curriculum overhauled, and classical subjects demoted to suit the needs of the less able, the less academic child introduced to the realities of an advanced secondary education, an extension to the college was required by the mid-1970s. Work got underway in 1977, ended in 1979, and the "New Building" was inaugurated in 1981, the 75th anniversary of the college's foundation. Laverty began improvements to the college's boarding facilities but departed in January 1982 to become cathedral parish administrator.

Daniel Carr, tenth president of the college, studied there too and joined the staff. During nearly seven years as president, Carr continued improvements begun under his predecessor and encouraged the college's first computer network of BBCs (a first for the county). The first computer in the school was an Apple II. Edward Harvey was the teacher who began a computer club at the college in 1980. With the number of boarders declining under Carr's presidency, some dormitories could be turned into classrooms. In 1988, Carr was sent to the same remote village in another part of the county as Cunnea (who had retired), though Carr recovered to receive the title of monsignor.

Cathal O'Fearrai, eleventh president of the college, had been recalled from Dublin in 1982 by Bishop of Raphoe Séamus Hegarty and posted to the college's teaching staff. Six years later he became president, overseeing the creation of a computer laboratory, an all-weather pitch, and a front playing field. With the development of secondary schools in the county, the number of boarders at the college continued to decline and in 1992 the college's boarding wing was shut. This allowed the president to create a library and more classrooms from the last available boarding facilities, an achievement completed before he was sent away in 1996.

Michael Carney, twelfth president of the college, like many of his predecessors studied there. He was the college's organist and assistant director of the college's choir (1980–83) before being appointed to the college's teaching staff in 1989–90, teaching history, music, and religion, until assuming the presidency in 1996. As president, Carney accompanied students and teachers of the German language to Vienna, Austria in 1999. Links with other continental schools were also developed, including a school in Perros-Guirec, Brittany in northwestern France. The annual ski trip began in 1997. Other events during Carney's presidency included the separate deaths of, first, a student and, later, a member of the teaching staff — Antoin Ó Colla of Cloughaneely, who had taught Irish, history, and geography at the college since 1974 (the same year he graduated from University College Galway). In addition, the college celebrated its centenary year in 2006. Carney served as president of the college until 2009, taking up residency as priest at Ramelton where he was in situ when local scientist William Cecil Campbell won the 2015 Nobel Prize in Physiology or Medicine.

In 2009, Christopher Darby, until that time vice-principal of Coláiste Cholmcille in Ballyshannon, became the first lay president of the college, taking over from Carney. He retired in 2019.

Damien McCroary, a teacher of religion and history from Doneyloop in Castlefin who joined the staff under Carney in 2002 and who had been Darby's deputy since 2017, succeeded him. The All-Ireland-winning Gaelic footballer, Colm McFadden, was promptly appointed his deputy. As with several of his predecessors, McCroary had to deal with the death of a student. He also had to deal with a burglary and a viral pandemic, the latter of which shut the school for six months and caused all examinations to be cancelled. Then, when the school had reopened, the Government shut it and all others in the country for several months again at the start of the following year as the viral pandemic worsened. 2025 brought the death of a teacher.

=== Silver Jubilee ===
The college's silver jubilee occurred in 1931 during Kerr's presidency. The foundation stone for the college's "New Wing" was laid on 23 September that year as part of the events held to mark the occasion. High Mass was held in the nearby cathedral, over which Kerr presided. In his sermon he noted that past students of the college had gone on to become priests or to work in civil or military professions.

A banquet was held that evening, at which a toast was proposed to the Bishop of Raphoe, William MacNeely and the hope expressed that he would be alive to witness the Golden Jubilee (he was).

The occasion also prompted the establishment of the past students' union. Its meeting and dinner would occur annually for many decades. It vanished during the 1960s.

=== Golden Jubilee ===
The college's golden jubilee occurred in 1956 during Finnegan's presidency. In April that year, Patrick Kerr, College President throughout the 1930s and the first half of the 1940s, and who had since risen to the rank of Archdeacon of the Roman Catholic Diocese of Raphoe, died. Events held on Wednesday, 26 September, marked the jubilee. According to the Derry People, "close on three hundred past students...came from all parts of the country, and some from overseas, to do honour to their Alma Mater". One member of the original staff, Denis J. Murray, was still alive and present on the day. As with the earlier jubilee, High Mass was held in the nearby cathedral, this time presided over by a former member of staff, John McMackin (who had by then become a professor of English at the pontifical university of St Patrick's College, Maynooth).

A banquet was held that evening in the study hall. According to The Irish Press, a telegram to Bishop MacNeely from the Pope, and which recognised the occasion, was read aloud to those in attendance. Among the other guests were Bishop of Derry Neil Farren and two former students – the then Leas-Cheann Comhairle Cormac Breslin and Minister for Local Government Pa O'Donnell. Also present was Finnegan's predecessor as president, McLoone (based in Killybegs for the previous two years), who returned to Letterkenny on Tuesday 25 September 1956. After toasts to figures such as the Pope and bishop (the latter by Breslin) were offered, McLoone proposed a toast to Éire. He spoke in the Irish language for several minutes, then he died. He was promptly returned to Killybegs that same evening and interred that Friday following a requiem mass which was overseen by Bishop MacNeely and each priest of that diocese. A photograph of the golden jubilee group taken at the college's front door features McLoone on the day of his death.

=== Centenary ===
The college's centenary occurred in 2006 during Carney's presidency. A weekend of events marked the occasion, beginning on Friday, 6 October, with an exhibition and the launch of the centenary booklet. Bishop of Derry Séamus Hegarty – a former student and, later, patron – opened the exhibition. On display were books, uniforms and other memorabilia. The exhibition included photographs of past and present staff and students, as well as the college's sports teams. No presidential deaths are recorded during the event.

On the Saturday a sporting exhibition took place on the playing fields, including a veterans' football match, as well as a veterans' game of association football.

The traditional Mass in the nearby cathedral on these occasions was overseen by Bishop of Raphoe Philip Boyce on the Sunday. The Mount Errigal Hotel hosted a dinner dance that evening.

Head Boy for the centenary year was James McNicholl. Others present amongst the student body during the centenary year included (with class saint for year reference): Seniors: Mark McGowan (Francis), Ross Wherity (Fergal), John Logue (USI president; Fabian), Adrian Harmon (AA Roadwatch presenter; Finnian), Michael Murphy (Ernan), Antoin McFadden (Eithne), Seán McVeigh (Elizabeth) and Eamonn Doherty (Declan); Juniors: Cillian Morrison (Catherine), Mark English (two years before the Transition Year that would see him take up running; Benedict), Caolan Ward (Bartholemew), and Conor Parke (Albert).

Other events took place throughout the academic year. These culminated in the College Centenary Golf Classic at Letterkenny Golf Club on Sunday 8 April 2007. The professional golfer Paul McGinley – recently seen further south at the Ryder Cup, and whose father Mick studied at the college and was part of the 1956 MacRory Cup-winning team – launched the College Centenary Golf Classic. McGinley provided two prizes for the event: a set of TaylorMade golf clubs and one of his 2006 Ryder Cup sweaters.

== Governance ==
The college was founded on a Roman Catholic basis, under the trusteeship of the Bishop of Raphoe. It serves approximately 900 students – from Letterkenny and its surrounding area – and is one of the few remaining all-male schools in northwestern Ireland.

From its foundation until 2004, a single manager oversaw the college. Government regulation of education obliged the college to comply with the terms of the 1998 Education Act and the Education and Welfare Act, 2000. In 2004 the college's management structure was altered and a board of management established in place of the single manager.

The college continues to be under the trusteeship of the Bishop of Raphoe.

Women have been among the staff since 1929. Between 1929 and 1991, first requested by McCaul during his presidency, two Sisters of Mercy were appointed to the staff of the college. One of the women served as matron and tended to the health of the college's students. The other woman was director of domestic affairs in the college kitchens. The college employed a female secretary in 1981.

=== List of presidents ===
There have been 14 presidents of the college since its foundation. All but two were members of the teaching staff before being appointed to the college presidency; the exceptions being Patrick Kerr (POSEC4) and Christopher Darby (POSEC13). Two presidents have died in office; these are denoted with a †. Six presidents had themselves been educated at the college; these are highlighted .

- Edward Maguire (1906–1910)
- Michael Ward (1910–1919)†
- Patrick D. McCaul (1919–1929)
- Patrick Kerr (1929–1944)
- Arthur McLoone (1944–1954)
- Christopher Finnegan (1954–1960)†
- Daniel J. Cunnea (1961–1969)
- Peter McMahon (1969–1971)
- P. Austin Laverty (1971–1982)
- Daniel Carr (1982–1988)
- Cathal Ó Fearraí (1988–1996)
- Michael Carney (1996–2009)
- Christopher Darby (2009–2019)
- Damien McCroary (2019–present)

== Buildings and grounds ==
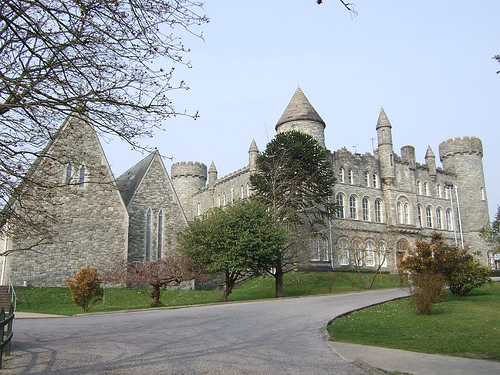
The College Chapel can be seen towards the left.

The college was designed by Irish architect Thomas Francis McNamara, attached to the firm of W. H. Burne and Co. The Belfast firm, Messrs Laverty and Co., were contracted to carry out the job. The cost of the building was approximately £22,000.

A three-storey edifice resembling a medieval keep, it has been called "the castle on the hill". Architectural features include four turreted round towers and flying buttresses which are modelled on the nearby cathedral. There is a medial courtyard and a stone chapel. A habitat on the grounds comprises flora, fauna, and fungi, including a monkey puzzle tree on the front lawn.

The foundation stone for the "New Wing" was laid on 23 September 1931 as part of the silver jubilee. It opened in September 1933, when it was used initially as accommodation for those priests who had, until that time, lived at addresses on the adjacent College Row, close by the school gates.

The college chapel was finished in 1952 during the presidency of McLoone. The chapel was designed by J. J. Robinson, architect of Galway Cathedral, and completed in 1961 at a cost of £42,000. The outline of a subterranean toilet block parallel to the College Chapel, which was used until the mid-1930s, can still be seen today. On Saturday 21 October 2017, the class of 1962–67 (featuring future Member of Cabinet Jim McDaid) held a reunion at the college, which began with a service in the College Chapel to remember the eight who were absent due to death.

Two science laboratories and a demonstration room were added in 1964 during the presidency of Daniel J. Cunnea, who was schooled in, and took an interest in, science and mathematics. Work got underway on a further extension to the college in 1977 during the presidency of Laverty. Work concluded in 1979, and the "New Building" was inaugurated in 1981 — the 75th anniversary of the college's foundation. O'Fearrai created the College Library by converting the remnants of the boarding facilities after this wing closed in 1992. Early 21st-century efforts to attempt a further extension proved fruitless. Two plans were drawn up, but an approach was never finished. As per planning regulations, the school installed a set of ramps and two chair-lifts. To serve first-year students, three prefabs were installed in summer 2008; these were followed by four ancillary prefabs in summer 2010.

The first playing field opposite the college was completed during the presidency of McLoone. On 3 May 2019, the Minister with Responsibility for Defence Paul Kehoe and Chief of Staff of the Defence Forces Vice Admiral Mark Mellett reviewed 114th Infantry Battalion on the playing fields at the college in advance of its UNIFIL deployment to Southern Lebanon, Ireland's largest overseas mission to date. The college was selected in recognition of County Donegal providing the largest contingent of troops to the mission (many of the rest came from Dublin and other Leinster counties). The ceremony included a parading of the unit colours (flag), a speech by Kehoe and a ceremonial "march past". Minister for Education Joe McHugh, in whose constituency the event took place, was among other dignitaries in attendance.

== College structure ==
The college comprises two houses. The first consists of the Junior Certificate (students of the first three years) and the second of Leaving Certificate (students of the final two years). Students of first year receive an orientation day on arrival dedicated entirely to them; students from more senior years are later introduced. Students of first year must take religion, Irish, English, mathematics, history, geography, science and physical education. They are granted options that range from modern European languages to music or art.

Each year is divided into form classes, named (usually) in honour of an Irish saint. These typically correspond with the year of the form class; for instance, an incoming first-year student would find himself in a class beginning with the letter A. The following illustrates each form class in use during the centenary year of 2006–07 (they may lessen or increase accordingly, depending on student numbers), and is included here as a reference point to notable students mentioned in the "Centenary" section above. The Saint Eunan is not used, though he would fit the scheme for year one of the leaving certificate.

== Academic ==
Junior and Leaving Certificate students usually undertake pre-test examinations (MOCKs) each February or March or April, whilst the final examinations follow in June. The college is one of only 18 schools in the county that offers the LCA programme.

Transition Year is available if desired and has been since 1979. It includes two work experience allotments and a choice between computer or sport GCSEs. Spanish is offered during Transition Year along with French and German. Transition Year modules offered – past and present – include first aid, tennis, cookery (introductory demonstrations for the boys provided by the dinner ladies in the college kitchens) the study of drama and performance (held at An Grianán Theatre), electronics (using the facilities of a local third-level institution) and driver awareness (an introduction to the rules of the road for prospective drivers) and a referee course (for those interested in football). 2007 brought the introduction of yoga and juggling.

The college has fielded participants at the Young Scientist and Technology Exhibition, with some success experienced during the 21st century. The college sends teams to contest the All-Ireland Higher Maths national finals, a competition for higher-level students of mathematics. The college won a gold medal in 1999 and a silver medal in 2007. The college represented also at the 2007 International Mathematical Olympiad in Hanoi. They are regular competitors in the All-Ireland Final.

== Sport ==
=== Football ===
- Years: Team trainer/manager
1952-60	John Wilson
1961-77	Michael Cullen
1977-99	Paddy Tunney
1999–present	Neil Gordon

"Football" for much of the college's history has meant Gaelic football, and Gaelic football only. This is due to the Gaelic Athletic Association's Rule 27, a former rule in the GAA's Official Guide which forbade members from playing or attending foreign sports.

The college has several national titles. It has a history of contesting the MacRory Cup, going back to finals in the 1950s and 1960s. Tony McKenna, captain of the college's 1956 MacRory Cup Final opponents St. Macartan's, has stated the 1956 team "Must have been the greatest team ever not to win the MacRory". John Wilson trained the team that reached the final of the 1961 MacRory Cup, though he departed for a teaching post at Gonzaga College midway through the year and a young Michael Cullen replaced him as team trainer. Wilson had previously been credited with overseeing a college victory over St Patrick's (an occasion that marked the first time any team from County Donegal defeated a team from County Cavan). Before Wilson departed, he lived at 2 College Row. With the house vacant, staff members Hugh Duffy and Michael Kerr moved in. In 1969, Kerr took over 1 College Row and became the college's vice-president the same year. Kerr was the country's first lay vice-present. Hugh Duffy served as president of ASTI.

In 1979, a college team managed by Paddy Tunney and featuring repeat Leaving Certificate student Charlie Mulgrew won a MacLarnon Cup against De La Salle by a scoreline of 0–11 to 0–7. They then won an All-Ireland Colleges B Final against St. Fintan's of Sutton, Dublin – a game played in Tullamore and ending in a scoreline of 2–6 to 2–5. This was noteworthy as Donegal's first title at All-Ireland level. The county team would not win its first All-Ireland under-21 title until 1982.

At the turn of the millennium, Paddy Tunney stood aside as manager of the college team after 22 years in charge. He took on the post of "director of football" and his assistant Neil Gordon replaced him. Gordon's first year in charge brought immediate success; the college team winning a MacLarnon Cup. Gordon continues to manage the college's Gaelic football team as of 2018, when he led them to a narrow one-point loss after extra-time in an Ulster final replay.

The college won the Ulster Herald Cup in 2004, its first Herald Cup title in 25 years. The college football team reached the 2007 All-Ireland B Colleges Football Final. That campaign went as follows: On 25 March 2007, the college defeated Rathmore by a scoreline of 1–9 to 2–3 at Casement Park in Belfast (they had travelled there six days earlier only for the match to be postponed). This brought the team to the semi-final in which they defeated Rice College of Westport. St Mary's of Edenderry were the college's opponents in the All-Ireland Final at Breffni Park in Cavan on 21 April 2007. A penalty save by St Eunan's goalkeeper John Carr ensured the match went to extra-time but the team lost by a scoreline of 2–12 to 0–14. This encouraged the college to again contest the MacRory Cup (i.e. the "A" competition); The team reached the semi-final of the 2008 MacRory Cup, in which St Michael's College of Enniskillen overcame them by a scoreline of 1–17 to 0–7 on 22 February 2008.

Teachers at the college involved in the Gaelic Athletic Association include All-Ireland winning footballer Colm McFadden, Glenswilly and Donegal under-20 county football team manager Gary McDaid, and Mickey Houston. Mickey is a former club manager and was also a selector for the Donegal county football team but quit after a row with the manager. He was enjoying the game when his authority was undermined and substitutions were made without his consultation.

During the twentieth century, three students played senior inter-county football while attending the college; these were Seamus Hoare, Martin Carney and Paul McGettigan. In total, seven students have achieved Ulster All Stars while playing for the college. These are, with their years of attendance included, as follows: Sean McEwen (1987–1992 – left corner back 1992), Hugh Brendan Kerr (1992 – 1998 left corner back 1998), Mark McGowan (2001–2007), Michael Murphy, Ciaran Cannon, Shaun Patton and Cormac Callaghan.

Colm McFadden, Neil Gallagher, Rory Kavanagh and Michael Boyle – all of whom played for the college football team – played for the Donegal county football team during its most successful period, each winning a National Football League title in 2007, an All-Ireland Senior Football Championship in 2012 and several Ulster Senior Football Championships along the way. Michael Murphy – the future All-Ireland winning Donegal team captain – also captained his school team.

The college were MacRory Cup semi-finalists in 2008 with a team featuring Murphy, and were quarter-finalists in 2015 with a team featuring Conor Morrison and Niall O'Donnell.

The relative lack of success of the college – and hence Donegal, as it is the county's foremost competitor – in the MacRory Cup has been explained by Declan Bonner as follows: "The main reason... is because some of the big schools in the north take in a huge amount of students, and can boast players from up to ten to twelve clubs sometimes. In contrast, St Eunan's only take their players from about seven schools and even at that, they wouldn't be getting all the best players from those areas".

=== Association football ===
With Gaelic football the college's dominant sport, the development of association football was deterred by the Gaelic Athletic Association's Rule 27. It could not, therefore, become an "official" extracurricular activity at the college until the early 1970s. An illicit soccer league did, however, operate at the college and students even successfully convinced one of the priests who was a professor at the college to act as referee – provided that they lift the ball and play the Gaelic way in the event that less lenient members of the teaching clergy should wander by.

Since these early experiments with the game, the college has achieved several titles at national level. The first success at national level was the defeat of Saint Joseph's, Fairview, by 1–0 in the final of the 1978 FAIS Junior Cup held at Tolka Park. 1979 brought the college's first senior title at national level, with the team defeating Dublin's Beneavin College by 2–0 in the final of the FAIS Senior Cup held at Terryland Park.

The college won national senior titles in consecutive years in the mid-1980s. The 1985 team – led by Michael Houston – defeated Beneavin by 3–0, while a penalty shoot-out at Belfield Park decided 1986 in the college's favour.

Consecutive national senior titles also came in the mid-2000s. The 2004 team defeated De La Salle College Waterford, by 3–0 in the final at Belfield, while the 2005 team (featuring Michael Boyle, Ciaran Greene and, as a 79th-minute substitute, Mark McGowan) comprehensively defeated a Tallaght outfit by 4–1, also at Belfield Park. The 2004 senior victory was accompanied by under-16 and under-14 titles, the former defeating Summerhill College of Sligo by 1–0 after extra time, while Ollie Horgan managed the latter side to victory in Mullingar. Horgan went on to become manager of the Republic of Ireland schoolboys team and also of Finn Harps, leading the latter team to the League of Ireland Premier Division (the top flight of Ireland's football league system).

Former Finn Harps player and manager Charlie McGeever was also a member of the teaching staff.

=== Golf ===
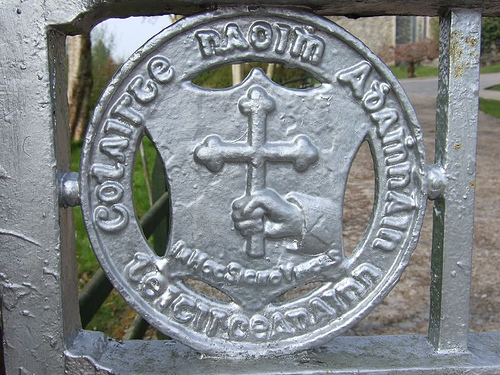
Near contiguous view of one of the College's front gates — with Coláiste Naomh Adhamhnáin Leitirceanainn and the motto In hoc signo vinces visible on the crest

The college has a competitive history in golf. Michael Cullen oversaw the college's participation in the Aer Lingus Golf Championship during the 1970s. Peter Hickey became the professional at Cork Golf Club.

During the 1980s, the college played in the Ulster Matchplay Championships and the Derryveagh Crystal Golf Championship.

The college won the Donegal Schools' Championship at senior and junior levels in 1993. The senior team won again in 1994.

Four more senior Championship and League titles followed during the 1990s, as well as two in 2000 and 2001. Conrad Logan, who would go on to become a professional footballer in the English Football League, featured in those last two at the turn of the millennium; indeed, Logan's chip and putt sealed the 2001 win. Stephen Sweeney, who went on to become a club professional from Royal County Down Golf Club, played alongside Logan in 2001.

Led by team captain Michael Cullen, the college entered and won the 1995 Donegal Teachers' Championship, with a team also consisting of Jimmy Ward, Edward Harvey, Pat Hickey, Paraic O'Dowd and Tommy Nangle, the winner of the individual award.

=== Other ===
Mark English – described by Jerry Kiernan as Ireland's "greatest talent" in middle-distance running – was a student at the college. English only made the switch to athletics during his Transition Year, a testament to the success of that experiment which was first made available to students in 1979.

The college is competitive in swimming.

Hurling, a sport at which Donegal teams are not traditionally dominant, has had teams from the college progress to the semi-finals.

The college has a rugby union team, re-established in the 2007–08 academic year after many years of absence. It started playing competitive rugby against other schools in the county and developed under-14, under-16 and ultimately under-18 squads. All age categories compete in their respective Donegal Schools Cup competitions against other schools: Abbey VS (Donegal), Carndonagh CS, Coláiste Ailigh, Coláiste Cholmcille (Ballyshannon), Loreto (Milford), Mulroy College (Milford), Rosses CS (Dungloe), St Columb's College (Derry) and Saint Columba's College (Stranorlar). The college won the first rugby silverware in its history in January 2014, by defeating Saint Columba's College Stranorlar to win the Senior (U18s) Donegal Schools Cup.

The college won a national basketball title in 2020.

== Musicals, operas, operettas and other performances ==
The college has a rich operatic tradition dating back to its foundation. The first performance held there was of Finnola or The Borrowed Bride, a piece penned by a Loreto sister especially for the Aonach of 1906 (a final fundraising event at the newly opened College). Operas and operettas were staged in the Recreational Hall after its completion. They previously took place on an enlarged stage in the Study Hall, with the public admitted — thus allowing for expenses on costumes and performing rights to be covered. Sometimes "girls" were borrowed from the nearby Loreto Convent to participate. Gradually, the British and American "pop music" reached Ireland and interest in the more traditional performances lessened among the students. Efforts were made during the 1980s and 1990s to revive these performances, albeit with the newer musical theatre in place of the opera/operettas of old – the college even sanctioned a production dating from as recently as the early 1970s. It was to no avail. These efforts at revival did nothing for the more sceptical among the student populace. Nowadays, the remnants of the old tradition are best seen in a "rock concert" – held each May since 2000 in the local An Grianán Theatre.

A partial record of college performances of the operettas and Gilbert and Sullivan operas is extant.

An early performance

Date	Performance
July 1906	Finnola or The Borrowed Bride

Gilbert and Sullivan years

Date	Performance
1929	The Pirates of Penzance
March 17, 1930	H.M.S. Pinafore
1931	The Mikado
1932-34	Unknown
1935	Iolanthe
1936–38	Unknown
February 1939	The Gondoliers
February 1940	The Pirates of Penzance
February 1941	Princess Ida
February 1942	Patience
February 1943	The Yeomen of the Guard
1944	Unknown
December 1945	H.M.S. Pinafore
December 1946	The Pirates of Penzance
December 1947	The Gondoliers
December 1948	Ruddigore
1949-51	Unknown
February 1952	Iolanthe
February 1953	The Mikado
1954-58	No productions

Operettas

Date	Performance
December 1959	Lilac Time
December 1960	The Maid of the Mountains

Return to Gilbert and Sullivan

Date	Performance
December 1961	The Mikado
December 1962	The Pirates of Penzance
December 1963	Ruddigore
December 1964	Iolanthe
December 1965	The Yeomen of the Guard
December 1966	H.M.S. Pinafore
December 1967	The Mikado
November/December 1968	The Gondoliers
December 1969	The Pirates of Penzance
December 1970	Iolanthe
1971–76	No productions

Operettas

Date	Performance
1977	Blossom Time
1979	The Student Prince

Musicals

Date	Show
1980	Oklahoma!
1990	Oliver!
1991	The King and I
1992	West Side Story
1998	Grease

== Computer club ==
Participants in the "Computer Club" of the 1980s included Neil Gordon (who would later teach at the college, organise annual ski trips abroad and manage the football team) and Kevin Gillespie (later Monsignor and Cathedral Parish Administrator). Gordon's inaugural presentation was called "Fuel Consumption", an early indication of where his future interests would lie. The "Computer Club" soon vanished though, as its main activities were absorbed into the curriculum.

Damien Blake, who later became the youngest-ever mayor of Letterkenny, set up the school's first website.

== Other clubs ==
Others include clubs dedicated to books, cinema and games.

== Overseas expeditions ==
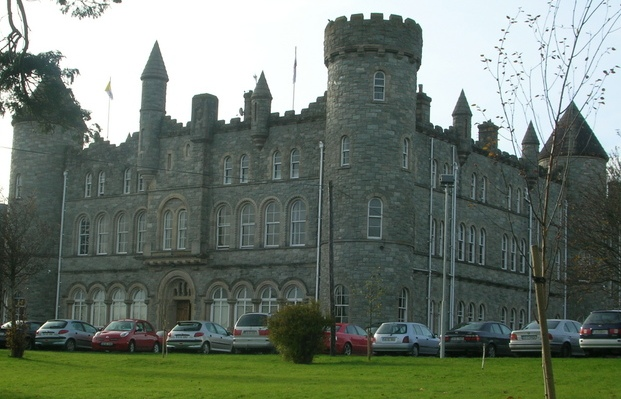
In this photograph, taken from the front lawn, many of the cars driven by staff members are visible.

Each year since the late twentieth century, teachers and students alike head for a ski resort during the holidays. The first trip, to Andorra, was organised in 1997. The 2008 trip, when Neil Gordon led a troupe of skiers to the United States, proved eventful – the Airbus craft bringing them home experienced motor difficulties in mid-flight and had to return to Logan International Airport after several hours in the air. The aborted flight received coverage in national media, such as The Irish Times.

The college has taken part in several foreign exchange programmes involving schools in Brittany and Vienna. Many European students have also availed of the education offered by the college – coming from as far as Spain, France and Austria.

== Notable staff ==
- Poet James Finnegan joined the staff in 1977.
- Ollie Horgan – the manager of Finn Harps and the Republic of Ireland national schoolboy football team joined the teaching staff in 1989 and taught mathematics and P.E.E. until his death in 2025.
- Mickey Houston – the football manager and Donegal selector joined the staff in 1979.
- Gary McDaid – the former manager of both Glenswilly and the Donegal under-20 county football team has taught P.E.E. since joining the staff in 2002.
- Colm McFadden – the All-Ireland winning Gaelic football All Star taught mathematics
- Charlie McGeever – taught P.E.E. between 1992 and 2002, managed Finn Harps to the 1999 FAI Cup Final while doing so, then moved to Clonmel
- Caolan McGonagle – the Ulster Senior Football Championship winning Gaelic footballer teaches PE and mathematics.
- William MacNeely, who spent 40 years as Bishop of Raphoe between 1923 and 1963, was appointed to the staff of the college after his ordination.
- Caolan Ward – the Ulster Senior Football Championship winning Gaelic footballer was teaching there when he retired from playing inter-county football in 2025.
- John Wilson – previously All-Ireland winning Gaelic footballer with Cavan (known while a member of staff as "Big Johnny") taught at the college between 1952 and 1960, and trained the school team until he left to take up a teaching post at Gonzaga College in Dublin.

== Notable alumni ==
Broadcast media

- Pat Gibson – won the UK version of Who Wants to Be a Millionaire? (2004); won Mastermind (2005); won the BBC Radio 4 quiz show Brain of Britain (2006); won Mastermind Champion of Champions (2010); features as the Seventh Egghead on Eggheads
- Declan Harvey – BBC News television and radio broadcaster
- Gary O'Hanlon – food ambassador who has appeared on Four Live, MasterChef Ireland and The Restaurant

Business

- Conrad Gallagher – Michelin star-winning chef; cooked for President of the United States Bill Clinton, listed in Who's Who

Clergy and vocations

- John Dominic Crossan – New Testament scholar and co-founder of the Jesus Seminar
- Kevin Gillespie – Monsignor with ties to two Popes
- Séamus Hegarty – Bishop of Raphoe (1982–94); Bishop of Derry (1994–2011)
- James McDyer – Canon
- Seán Rooney – soldier killed while serving on the UNIFIL peacekeeping mission in Lebanon in 2022

Literature

- Seosamh Mac Grianna – writer
- Niall Ó Dónaill – lexicographer

Performance

- Ray McAnally – actor
- John Nee – actor

Politics

- Cormac Breslin – Ceann Comhairle (1967–73)
- Neil Blaney – Minister for Posts and Telegraphs (1957); Minister for Local Government (1957–66); Minister for Agriculture and Fisheries (1966–70); Father of the Dáil (1987–95)
- Jimmy Harte – Senator (2011–15)
- Paddy Harte – Minister of State at the Department of Posts and Telegraphs (1981–82)
- Dessie Larkin – Member of Donegal County Council (1999–2014) and Mayor of Letterkenny
- John Logue – former president of the Union of Students in Ireland
- Don Lydon – Senator (1987–2007) and psychologist
- Jim McDaid – Member of the Ahern Cabinet (1997–2002)
- Bernard McGlinchey – Political strategist and Senator (1961–83)
- Pa O'Donnell – Minister for Local Government in the Second Inter-Party Government under Taoiseach John A. Costello

Sports

- Tony Blake – inter-county footballer
- Michael Boyle – All-Ireland winning inter-county footballer and coach
- Dermot Brick Molloy – All-Ireland winning inter-county footballer
- Martin Carney – RTÉ sports commentator and former inter-county footballer
- Paul Carr – All-Ireland winning inter-county footballer
- Gary Crossan – long-distance runner
- Mark Crossan – All-Ireland winning inter-county footballer
- Philip Deignan – Olympian and former professional cyclist
- Brendan Devenney – inter-county footballer
- Eamonn Doherty – inter-county footballer
- Mark English – Olympic middle-distance runner; multiple European Athletics Championships medalist
- Sean Ferriter – inter-county footballer
- Neil Gallagher – All-Ireland winning inter-county footballer; captained the Donegal senior football team to the 2007 National Football League title
- Dale Gorman – midfielder with Stevenage and Leyton Orient
- Ciaran Greene – inter-county footballer and soccer player
- Seamus Hoare – inter-county footballer
- Rory Kavanagh – All-Ireland winning inter-county footballer
- Manus Kelly – rally driver and three-time winner of the Donegal International Rally
- Conrad Logan – goalkeeper with Leicester, Stockport, Luton, Bristol Rovers, Rotherham, Rochdale, Hibs, Mansfield, Forest Green and Anstey Nomads
- Antoin McFadden – All-Ireland winning inter-county footballer
- Colm McFadden – All-Ireland winning inter-county footballer
- Gary McFadden – All-Ireland winning inter-county footballer
- Paul McGettigan – inter-county footballer
- Mick McGinley – inter-county footballer; father of professional golfer Paul, who starred at the 2002 Ryder Cup and captained the winning 2014 Ryder Cup team
- Mark McGowan – inter-county footballer
- Kevin McMenamin – inter-county footballer
- Seán McVeigh – inter-county hurler; captained the Donegal senior team to victory in the 2020 Nicky Rackard Cup
- Cillian Morrison – inter-county footballer and soccer player
- Conor Morrison – inter-county footballer
- Charlie Mulgrew – All-Ireland winning inter-county footballer
- Michael Murphy – All-Ireland winning inter-county and international rules footballer; captained the Donegal senior football team to victory in the 2012 All-Ireland Senior Football Championship Final; captained Ireland to victory in the 2013 International Rules Series
- Niall O'Donnell – inter-county footballer
- Shaun Patton – inter-county footballer
- Kevin Rafferty – All-Ireland winning inter-county footballer
- Tommy Ryan – All-Ireland winning inter-county footballer
- Caolan Ward – inter-county footballer
- Ross Wherity – inter-county footballer

== See also ==
- The Loreto Convent – where many of the lads' sisters were taught.

== Works cited ==
- St. Eunan's College: 1906 – 2006. Browne Printers Ltd. 2006.
