= Paddy Crozier =

Irish Gaelic footballer and manager

Personal information
- Native name: Pádraig Crúiseír (Irish)
- Born: Ballymaguigan
- Occupation: Electrician

Sport
- Sport: Gaelic football
Club management
- Years: Club
- Early 1990s Early 1990s 1996/7?-? 2003/4?-2005 2010 – present: Donegal (Philadelphia); Ballymaguigan; Lavey; Dungiven; Omagh St. Enda's
Inter-county management
- Years: Team
- 1995-1996 & 2000-? 2006-2008 2006-2008: Derry minors Derry Under 21s Derry
Inter-county titles as manager
County	League	Province	All-Ireland
Derry minors (1st term) Derry minors (2nd tem) Derry	- 1 -	1; 2 -	1; 2 -

Paddy Crozier (Irish: Pádraig Crúiseír) is an Irish Gaelic football manager and former player who managed the Derry county team between 2006 and 2008, guiding the county to a National League title. He has also managed a number of club teams and Derry underage teams. Crozier currently manages Omagh St Enda's. He was a distant relation of former Derry manager Eamonn Coleman.

== Managerial career ==
=== Inter-county ===
Crozier was manager of the Derry Minor side that won the 1995 Ulster Minor Championship and finished runners-up to Westmeath in that year's All-Ireland Minor final. He rejoined the management team in 2000 under Chris Brown and Derry won the 2000 and 2002 Ulster Minor Championships, as well as the 2002 All-Ireland Minor Championship.

Having previously served terms as selector, Crozier was appointed manager of the Derry Senior team in October 2005 for the 2006, 2007 and 2008 seasons. As well as the Senior job, he also took on the role of Under 21 manager for the three seasons.

He managed Derry to success in the 2008 National League, defeating Kerry in the final. He was awarded BBC Radio Foyle - Bank of Ireland Sports Personality of the Month for April 2008.

There was much speculation with regards to Cozier's future as Derry boss following their 2008 All-Ireland Qualifier Round 1 defeat to Monaghan, but county PRO Sean Gunning said on 5 August 2008 "Paddy Crozier continues to have the full backing and support of Derry County Board, players and genuine Derry supporters". The statement also condemned any criticism of the players and management team and added "We are proud Paddy Crozier has delivered an All-Ireland Senior football title to his native county". Crozier announced in late August that he was stepping down from the role after three years in charge.

=== Club ===
While living in the United States Crozier managed the Donegal side in Philadelphia. He led them to success in two North American Senior Football Championships. Upon returning to Ireland Crozier managed his home club Ballymaguigan and led them to the Derry Intermediate Championship and league double in 1993.

In 1996 Crozier took up the role of Lavey manager alongside Henry Downey. They led the club to the Derry Championship final in 1998, but were defeated by Bellaghy. Between 2003/4? and 2005 he managed Dungiven.

In December 2009 Crozier was announced as the new manager of Tyrone club side Omagh St. Enda's for the 2010 season.

== Playing career ==
=== Inter-county ===
Crozier represented Derry at Minor, Under 21 and Senior level.

=== Club ===
Paddy Crozier played club football for his native Ballymaguigan - winning the 1971 Derry Intermediate Championship were among his playing honours with the club. He also won a Dublin Senior Football Championship medal with the Civil Service side in 1980.

Preceded by Mickey Moran	Derry Senior Football Manager; 2006-2008	Succeeded by Damian Cassidy
