= Raymond Gallagher =

Raymond Gallagher may refer to:

- Raymond F. Gallagher (born 1939), American politician
- Raymond Joseph Gallagher (1912–1991), American Roman Catholic bishop
- Raymond Gallagher (Gaelic footballer)
