= Johnny McCafferty =

Irish Gaelic footballer

Personal information
- Born: 1979 (age 46–47)
- Occupation: Seems to be a businessman?

Sport
- Sport: Gaelic football
- Position: Forward
Club
- Years: Club
- ?–: Termon
Inter-county
- Years: County
- c. 2000–200?: Donegal

Johnny McCafferty (born 1979) is an Irish Gaelic footballer who plays for Termon and, formerly, the Donegal county team.

In Mickey Moran's first game in charge of Donegal, at home to Offaly in October 2000, McCafferty scored the game's only goal which assisted his team to victory.

McCafferty was involved in championship football for his county in 2001 and 2003. His substitution (and those of John Gildea and Raymond Sweeney) out of the 2001 All-Ireland Senior Football Championship replay defeat to Fermanagh led to Moran falling out with one of his selectors, who believed he had not been informed of the decision in advance.

Having previously scored a goal in Moran's first game, McCafferty also scored a goal away to Galway in February 2003, in what was Brian McEniff's first game during his last spell as manager.

He won the 2019 All-Ireland Masters Football Championship with Donegal.

McCafferty was still playing for his club at the age of 40. He scored four points (two of which were frees) in the final of the 2003 Donegal Senior Football Championship, in what was his club's first appearance at the concluding stage of the competition. He also played in the final of the 2008 Donegal Senior Football Championship.

He also played for Donegal Boston.

He is the son of Sheila McCafferty. Married to Lisa (née Hegarty), he has a son and two daughters.
