= Peter Boyle (Gaelic footballer) =

Irish Gaelic footballer

Sport
- Sport: Gaelic football
- Position: Goalkeeper
Club
- Years: Club
- ?–: Aodh Ruadh
Inter-county
- Years: County
- 201?–2018: Donegal

Peter Boyle is an Irish Gaelic footballer who has played as a goalkeeper for Aodh Ruadh and the Donegal county team.

== Playing career ==
Boyle played throughout the 2010 Ulster Under-21 Football Championship campaign, and made noteworthy contributions during the four-point semi-final victory over Derry. He was still a minor. He then played in the final of the 2010 All-Ireland Under-21 Football Championship, which Donegal (managed by Jim McGuinness) narrowly lost to Dublin (managed by Jim Gavin).

His prospects at senior level under McGuinness's management were limited by the presence of established number one Paul Durcan and, also by Michael Boyle. However, McGuinness called him into the senior squad upon his appointment in late-2010 and Boyle did start for Donegal in McGuinness's first National Football League game in charge against Sligo in 2011.

Under the management of Rory Gallagher, Boyle started five games during the 2016 National Football League — against Down, Cork, Mayo and Kerry, and was credited with "two great saves" during the last of the five games against Roscommon at O'Donnell Park in Letterkenny. Gallagher favoured Mark Anthony McGinley in goal for later games of that league campaign.

McGinley retained his place throughout League and Championship 2017, as well as starting the opening league fixture of 2018, thus restricting Boyle to the bench.

He did appear in the 2017 All-Ireland Senior Football Championship qualifier loss to Galway at Markievicz Park, but only after McGinley had been dismissed shortly before half-time.

Under new manager Declan Bonner, Boyle returned in goal as a substitute in the opening fixture of the 2018 National Football League against Kerry, entering the field of play in the seventeenth minute following an injury to McGinley. Boyle then started against Galway in the second league fixture, and again started in the third fixture against Dublin (at Croke Park). Then, in the fourth league fixture against Kildare, manager Declan Bonner opted for Shaun Patton as Donegal's first choice goalkeeper, prompting Boyle to quit.

== Honours ==
Donegal

- All-Ireland Under-21 Football Championship runner-up: 2010
- Ulster Under-21 Football Championship: 2010

Aodh Ruadh

- Donegal Intermediate Football Championship: 2020

Sporting positions
Preceded by Mark Anthony McGinley	Donegal Number One Goalkeeper; 2018	Succeeded by Shaun Patton
