= Paul Noone =

Paul Noone may refer to:

- Paul Noone (Gaelic footballer) (born 1980s), Swedish Gaelic footballer
- Paul Noone (rugby league) (born 1981), English rugby league footballer

== See also ==
- Paul Noon (born 1952), British trade unionist
- Paul Noonan (born 1974), Irish musician
