= Ballymaguigan GAC =

Derry-based Gaelic games club

St Trea's Ballymaguigan GFC
- Naomh Trea Baile Mhic Uiginn CLG
- Founded: 1944
- County: Derry
- Colours: Green, White and Gold
- Coordinates: 54°44′33.26″N 6°31′23.13″W

Playing kits
Standard colours

Senior Club Championships
	All Ireland	Ulster champions	Derry champions
Football:	0	0	1

Saint Trea's Ballymaguigan GFC (Irish: Naomh Trea Baile Mhic Uiginn CLG) is a Gaelic Athletic Association club based in Ballymaguigan, County Londonderry, Northern Ireland. It plays in Derry league and championships. It currently caters for both Gaelic football and Ladies' Gaelic football.

The club was founded in 1944 and has won the Derry Senior Football Championship once. Ballymaguigan fields Gaelic football teams at U-8, U-10, U-12, U-14, U-16, Minor, Reserve and Senior levels. Teams up to U-12 level compete in South Derry league and championships and U-14 level teams and upwards compete in All-Derry competitions.

== History ==
Gaelic games had been organised on the western shores of Lough Neagh for over 50 years before St Trea's GFC was formed. Before 1944 one team (Newbridge GAC) catered for the Ballymaguigan and Newbridge areas. Both areas are part of Ardtrea North parish. The American Army built Toome airfield during World War II. This effectively split the parish in two, making it very difficult for the Ballymaguigan-based players to travel to the pitch.

Paddy Bateson suggested a ball be bought so the Ballymaguigan players could train among themselves. Soon friendlies were arranged against established clubs. The first of these was against Castledawson. The first home fixture was against Greenlough. St Trea's GFC was soon formed on 23 April 1944. The name was in honour of Saint Trea who has many traditional associations with the area. The first chairman was John McCartney, with Paddy Bateson as vice-chairman. Ballymaguigan is a very small rural community, consisting approximately of 1-square-mile (2.6 km^{2}) in area.

The club played in the Moneyglass 7-a-side tournament on 26 June 1944 and in a Ballinderry tournament on 6 July 1944. The clubs first ever full team game was away at Castledawson in early June 1944, their first home fixture was against Greenlough on 17 September 1944. The clubs first ever competition was the Winter League of 1944/45. In 1949 the team were promoted to the senior division, they had a play off with Drumullan.

In 1950, the club built a small meeting hall. The erection of "the hut" was never seen as anything other than a temporary measure and plans proceeded for more permanent premises. That year the team won 3 matches in Division 1, against Desertmartin, Castledawson and Loup but lost against Newbridge in the McGlinchey Cup. The club reached the Semi Final of the Junior Championship but lost to Kilrea. In 1951 Ballymaguigan were awarded the South Derry Championship title, they beat Bellaghy II in the first round, Magherafelt in the second round and played Ballinderry in the final. The game was cancelled due to fighting and Ballinderry refused to play the replay because they accused a Ballymaguigan player of being ineligible. Ballymmaguigan also won the All-County Junior Championship on 22 September 1951 by defeating Ervey in Magherafelt, the scoreline was 2-06 1-03. The club also won the Derry Junior League in 1951. They finished 6th place in the Winter League. The club reached the semi-final of the South Derry Championship in 1952. They beat Magherafelt in the first round on a scoreline of 2-08 to 2-03 but lost to Lavey in the Semi-final. The club finished 3rd place in the league in 1953.

In December 1954, a farm came on the market and the club committee decided to purchase. The farm of approximately eight acres was acquired for £1,230. The task of converting this property into a playing area began immediately. Apart from hiring a bulldozer to level the ground, this work was carried out completely by voluntary labour. In 1956 the team beat Desertmartin in the championship first round on a scoreline of 3-10 to 2-06 but went on to lose to Bellaghy in the next round on a scoreline of 2-10 to 0.05

An all-enclosed pitch, considered to be one of the best in the county, was officially opened in 1957 by the then GAA President Séamus McFerran. Thus St Trea's were back playing on the grounds where the club had its beginnings in 1944. That year they defeated Slaughtneil, Newbridge and Ballinascreen in league games that season and they won the Coalisland Tournament beating Omagh by one point in the final. On 6 October 1957 the club played Newbridge in the South Derry Championship Final, the game was played at Newbridge and Ballymaguigan won on a scoreline of 3-06 to 2-06. On 13 October 1957 Ballymaguigan played Ballerin in the All-County final at Dungiven, they lost to a scoreline of 3-08 to 2-06. Ballymgauigan also finished 2nd in the league that year. Ballymaguigan played Newbridge in the Semi-final of the championship on a Sunday in January 1958 at the Ballymaguigan field in front of 600 spectators. Ballymaguigan won on a scoreline of 1-04 to 0-06. The county championship final that year was against Bellaghy, Bellaghy won the game on a scoreline of 3-06 to 0-07. In 1958 the Derry Championship changed to an open draw system so this meant that the old South Derry Championship wasn't played, the competition was replaced with the Sean Larkin Cup, Ballymaguigan won this cup in 1958, they beat Bellaghy in an early round, then Kilrea and they beat Ballinascreen in the final. The club retained the Larkin Cup in December 1959 beating Ballinascreen in the final again, the scoreline was 1-04 to 1-02.

In 1967, steel was purchased for building a hall and during the July holidays the foundations were laid. The hall was completed, again by voluntary labour, in 1969 and hall was officially opened at a variety concert, by GAA past President Alf Murray.

Three playing members of St Trea's, John Bateson (aged 19), James Sheridan (20) and Martin Lee (18), all members of the South Derry Brigade of the Provisional Irish Republican Army died when the bomb they were carrying exploded prematurely in Magherafelt on 18 December 1971. The trophy for the Derry Intermediate Football Championship is named after the three.

== Notable players ==
- Eamonn Coleman - former Derry manager and footballer.
- Gary Coleman – All Star winning Derry footballer. Son of Eamonn Coleman.
- Jim McKeever – 1958 Footballer of the Year.
- Paddy Crozier – former Derry manager.

== Honours ==
=== Senior ===
- Derry Senior Football Championship: 1
  - 1962

(runners-up) - 1957, 1958, 1961

- Derry Senior Football League: 1
  - 1962
- South Derry Senior Football Championship: 1
  - 1957
- South Derry Senior Football League: 1
  - 1949
- Derry Intermediate Football Championship: 5
  - 1971, 1993, 2001, 2003, 2009

(runners-up) - 1981, 2008, 2018

- Derry Intermediate Football League: 3
  - 1993, 1998, 2006
- Derry Junior Football Championship: 3
  - 1951, 1970, 2023
- Derry Junior Football League: 3
  - 1951, 2021, 2023
- South Derry Junior Football Championship: 2
  - 1951, 1969, 1970
- Seán Larkin Cup: 2
  - 1958, 1959
- Graham Cup: 2
  - 1970, 1971
- McGlinchey Cup: 3
  - 2011, 2023, 2024
- South Derry Winter League: 1
  - 1980

=== Reserves ===
- Derry Intermediate Reserve Football Championship: 2
  - 2003, 2004

(runners-up) - 2005

=== Minor ===
- Derry Minor 'B2' Championship: 1
  - 2018
- Tommy O'Neill Cup (Derry Minor 'B' Championship): 2
  - 1997, 2003
- South Derry Minor 'B' Football Championship: 2
  - 1997, 2003
- South Derry Minor 'B' Football League: 2
  - 1997, 2003

=== Ladies' football ===
- Senior Ladies Derry Intermediate League: 1
  - 2006

== See also ==
- Derry Senior Football Championship
- List of Gaelic games clubs in Derry
