= Newbridge, County Londonderry =

Townland in County Londonderry, Northern Ireland

Newbridge is a small townland in south County Londonderry, Northern Ireland. Stretching from Toomebridge in County Antrim, to Bellaghy, Castledawson, Magherafelt, and Ballymaguigan, the latter which shares the parish of Ardtrea North, St. Trea's.

Newbridge is the home to Anahorish Primary School and to Sean O'Leary's Newbridge GAC.
