= Donegal Boston =

Gaelic football club in Boston, Massachusetts

- Dún na nGall Boston
- Founded: 1988
- County: Boston
- Nickname: The green and golds
- Colours: Yellow and Green
- Grounds: Irish Cultural Centre

Playing kits
Standard colours

Senior Club Championships
	All Ireland	Northeast Division champions	Boston champions
Football:	-	1	5

Donegal Boston GFC is a Gaelic football club which was founded in 1988 in Boston, Massachusetts.

Boston is the second largest division of the GAA on the North American continent, after New York.

They train on Malibu Beach, Dorchester.

Among the club's former players are: All-Ireland Senior Football Championship winners Diarmuid Connolly, Jim McGuinness and Martin Penrose; All Stars Kevin Cassidy, Dessie Dolan and John Lynch; All-Ireland Senior Club Football Championship winner Liam Silke; Ireland international rules footballers Brendan Murphy and Colm Parkinson; former Australian Football League player Ray Connellan.

== History ==
Donegal Boston Gaelic Football Club is known as Donegal GFC or Donegal Boston for short. The club was founded in 1988 by Irish immigrants.

They won the North American Intermediate Football Championship in 1995.

New York county manager Seamus Sweeney, whose team nearly defeated Galway in the 2010 Connacht Senior Football Championship, first became involved in U.S. football after emigrating to Boston as an 18-year-old in the early 1990s, and played for Donegal Boston.

They won their first Boston Senior Football Championship title in 2002. In the 2002 final they scored a late goal from a 21-yard free.

They won the Boston Junior Football Championship in 2005.

In 2008, they won the Boston Junior Football Championship and were Boston Senior Football Championship finalists.

They won the 2015 North-East Men's Senior Football Championship.

They won the 2018 Boston Senior Football Championship. They did so with Dublin All-Ireland winner Diarmuid Connolly, whose transfer stateside was covered by media nationally in Ireland.

Connolly's unsuccessful effort to play for Donegal Boston again in 2019, when a minor problem with his ESTA could not be fixed before transfer deadline day, was again covered extensively by media nationally in Ireland.

In 2019, Donegal Boston were seeking four consecutive championship titles. However, Aidan McEnespies defeated the club in that year's final.

== Honours ==
- Boston Senior Football Championship: 2002, 2004, 2010, 2015, 2018
- Boston Junior Football Championship: 2005, 2008
- North American Senior Football Championship runner-up: 2002, 2003
- North American Intermediate Football Championship: 2005

== Players ==
County players to have represented the club include the following:

- John Bingham (Louth)
- Ciaran Bonner (Donegal, i.e. the county)
- Declan Bonner (Donegal)
- Michael Boyle (Donegal)
- Mark Bradley (Tyrone)
- Ryan Bradley (Donegal)
- Glen Burke (Tipperary)
- Jamie Carr (Louth)
- Michael Carroll (Donegal)
- Shane Carthy (Dublin)
- Kevin Cassidy (Donegal)
- Martin Caulfield (Donegal)
- Ray Connellan (Westmeath)
- Diarmuid Connolly (Dublin)
- Eamonn Doherty (Donegal)
- Dessie Dolan (Westmeath)
- Dermot Feely (Fermanagh)
- Raymond Gallagher (Fermanagh)
- John Gildea (Donegal)
- David Glennon (Westmeath)
- Denis Glennon (Westmeath)
- Cahir Healy (Laois)
- Rory Kavanagh (Donegal)
- Barry John Keane (Kerry)
- John Lynch (Tyrone)
- Cormac McAdam (Fermanagh)
- Johnny McCafferty (Donegal)
- Jim McGuinness (Donegal)
- Antoin McFadden (Donegal)
- Eoin McHugh (Donegal)
- Kevin McMenamin (Donegal)
- Paul Mannion (Dublin)
- Emlyn Mulligan (Leitrim)
- Brendan Murphy (Carlow)
- Ciarán Murtagh (Roscommon)
- Paul Noone (Roscommon)
- Colm Parkinson (Laois)
- Martin Penrose (Tyrone)
- James Ruane (Donegal)
- Keelan Sexton (Clare)
- Liam Silke (Galway)
- Matthew Smyth (Donegal)
- Adrian Sweeney (Donegal)
- Eoin Waide (Donegal)
- Declan Walsh (Donegal)
- Brian White (Louth)
- Peter Witherow (Donegal)
