= Raymond Gallagher (Gaelic footballer) =

Fermanagh Gaelic footballer

Personal information
- Born: 1970s

Sport
- Sport: Gaelic football
Clubs
- Years: Club
- ? St Brigid's; Donegal Boston
Inter-county
- Years: County
- 1993–2003: Fermanagh

Raymond Gallagher (born 1970s) is a former Gaelic footballer who played for several clubs and the Fermanagh county team.

His father Raymond Snr, a farmer, died in 2007. He was survived by his wife Mary, his only son and three daughters. The politician Tommy Gallagher is an uncle of Gallagher's, on his father's side. Fellow Fermanagh footballers Rory and Ronan Gallagher are cousins of his.

From 1986, he attended secondary school at St Michael's College, Enniskillen, where he won the 1992 MacRory Cup. He then played minor and under-21 football for his county, winning the 1994 Ulster Under-21 Football Championship. He played senior football while still a minor in 1993, manager Hugh McCabe giving him his debut, and won an All-Ireland Senior B Football Championship, Dr McKenna Cup and National Football League Division Four.

He sustained many injuries, first an athletic pubalgia as a teenager in 1993, a cruciate injury in 1994 which hampered his progress for the next two years, and two discs in his back which he had to have surgery on in 2001.

He played on until 2003, moving to Dublin to play with St Brigid's, but missing out on Fermanagh's run to the 2004 All-Ireland Senior Football Championship semi-final.

He did captain Fermanagh in 2003.

He also played for Donegal Boston.
