= Keelan Sexton =

Clare Gaelic footballer

Personal information
- Born: 1997 (age 28–29)

Sport
- Position: Forward
Clubs
Years	Club	Apps (scores)
	Kilmurry Ibrickane; Donegal Boston; CLG Na Fianna; Kilmurry Ibrickane	–2025; 2019– 2025–2026; 2026–
College
- Years: College
- University of Limerick
Inter-county
- Years: County
- 2016–2025: Clare

Keelan Sexton (born 1997) is a boxer and a Gaelic footballer who plays for the Kilmurry Ibrickane club. He played in the past for Na Fianna and at senior level for the Clare county team.

Keelan grew up in Quilty in West Clare. He was a student at the University of Limerick. His grandfather Martin Burke was a boxer in London during the 1960s and 1970s and Keelan took after him first before turning to the Gaelic football, winning three national titles representing the West Clare boxing club and two national titles afterwards when he represented the Ennis boxing club, representing Ireland in the Schoolboy Championships and getting a bronze medal there and a gold medal at the North European Championships.

== Playing carerer ==
Keelan played county minor, under-21 and senior in the same season. He turned 19 in July 2016 and was already in his second season on the senior panel. He was top scorer in a single game in the 2022 All-Ireland Senior Football Championship.

He retired from the inter-county football in 2025.

Keela was a Sigerson Cup player when in Limerick. He first played for Donegal Boston in 2019. Keelan left Clare completely to join CLG Na Fianna in time for the Dublin Senior Football Championship of 2025. He returned to his county club in January 2026.

== Education ==
As of 2022, Keelan was studying for a master's degree in law at Trinity College Dublin. As of 2025, he was working as a solicitor in Dublim for a number of years. Keelan did his Leaving Cert at Ennistymon CBS in 2016.
