= Michael Houston (football manager) =

Irish Gaelic football manager

Personal information
- Nickname: Mickey

Sport
- Sport: Gaelic football
Club management
- Years: Club
- St Eunan's

Michael 'Mickey' Houston is an Irish Gaelic football manager. He is a former manager of St Eunan's and a selector on the county panel during Mickey Moran's tenure. While working with the senior team he quit after a public falling out with Moran over the substitutions of John Gildea, Johnny McCafferty and Raymond Sweeney during a game. Houston has been linked with the senior Donegal job in the past.
