= Seamus Hoare =

Irish Gaelic footballer (died 2022)

Personal information
- Died: 16 May 2022 Parke House Nursing Home, Kilcock, County Kildare

Sport
- Sport: Gaelic football
- Position: Goalkeeper
Clubs
- Years: Club
- 19??–? 19??–?: St Eunan's; Leixlip
Inter-county
Years	County	Apps (scores)
1955–1969	Donegal	25+

Seamus Hoare (died 16 May 2022) (Note: At least one source gave his death date as Tuesday 17 May.) was an Irish Gaelic footballer who played as goalkeeper for St Eunan's and the Donegal county team. He represented Donegal for 14 years in the 1950s and 1960s. He also represented Ulster, winning four Railway Cups.

== Career ==
Hoare attended St Eunan's College. He was the first of three footballers from the twentieth century to have played for the Donegal county football team while still attending the College; the others being Martin Carney and Paul McGettigan. He played for Donegal for 14 years, making 25 championship appearances in that time; his championship debut came against Down in 1955 and he played his last game for his county against Cavan in 1969. He missed one championship match during his time — in 1961, Packie Boyle played instead of him against Derry. Hoare also played in the 1964–65 National Football League semi-final against Kerry.

He played in his first Ulster Senior Football Championship final in 1963.

Hoare won four Railway Cup medals with Ulster.

In May 2012, the Irish Independent named him as goalkeeper in its selection of Donegal's "greatest team" spanning the previous 50 years.

Hoare later lived in County Kildare. He played for the St Mary's Leixlip club and was a selector after retiring from playing (though he continued to maintain his fitness).

== Personal life ==
Hoare was from Church Lane in Letterkenny. He married Patricia (Patsy, née Gallagher), who predeceased him. He had four children: one son, Derek and three daughters, Anne-Marie Hesselden, Patricia Falino and Sheila Hoare; as well as grandchildren and great grandchildren.

In later life Hoare became a rugby union enthusiast.

Hoare died at Parke House Nursing Home in Kilcock, County Kildare, on Monday 16 May 2022.
