= Michael Boyle (footballer) =

Donegal Gaelic footballer (born 1986/87)

Personal information
- Native name: Mícheál Ó Baoill (Irish)
- Born: 1986/1987 Letterkenny, Ireland
- Occupation: Commercial manager in recruitment firm
- Height: 6 ft 0 in (183 cm)

Sport
- Sport: Gaelic football
- Position: Goalkeeper
Clubs
- Years: Club
- ?– c. 2015: Termon; Donegal Boston
College
- Years: College
- c. 2010–c. 2012: DCU
College titles
- Sigerson titles: 1
Inter-county
- Years: County
- 200?–2015: Donegal
Inter-county titles
- Ulster titles: 3
- All-Irelands: 1
- NFL: 1

Michael Boyle (born 1986/7) is an Irish sportsperson and Gaelic football coach. He plays with his local club Termon and also, formerly, for the Donegal county team.

Educated at St Eunan's College in Letterkenny, he was his county's number one goalkeeper in the past, though Paul Durcan had something to say about that. Boyle has also played soccer for Finn Harps in the League of Ireland.

== Playing career ==
=== College ===
Boyle studied Sports Science and Health at Dublin City University (DCU). Boyle won the Sigerson Cup twice in 2010 and 2012 with the DCU GAA team. He was goalkeeper on both occasions, on the team that beat UCC in the 2010 final and the team that beat Maynooth in the 2012 final. The Higher Education GAA later barred him for playing for his college due to a new rule it introduced, prompting the team manager to consider a boycott.

=== Club ===
Despite being a goalkeeper, Boyle was Termon's top scorer with four points in an away fixture against Aodh Ruadh at Fr Tierney Park in 2012. Termon defeated Aodh Ruadh by a total of five points, a score of 0–13 to 0–8. Boyle's performance led to media comparisons with Dublin goalkeeper Stephen Cluxton, who would regularly do likewise for his team, including scoring the winning point in the 2011 All-Ireland Senior Football Championship Final. Later that year, Boyle won the Donegal Intermediate Football Championship, again against Aodh Ruadh.

He also played for Donegal Boston, winning the North-East Men's Senior Football Championship in 2015.

Boyle did not play for Termon in 2020 as he was based in London, where he opted to remain for 2021.

=== Inter-county ===
Boyle was a member of the Donegal squad that won the 2007 National Football League.

He played in the first team for periods in 2005 and 2009. Rivalling Paul Durcan for a place in the Donegal team, Boyle appeared at half-time in a 2009 All-Ireland qualifier after Durcan fouled Clare player Gary Brennan and conceded a penalty. Boyle retained his starting place for the games against Galway at Markievicz Park and Cork at Croke Park.

Boyle was named on the bench for the 2012 Ulster Senior Football Championship final against Down, although he later claimed to have picked up 43 points playing golf at Slieve Russell in Cavan. He was also on the bench for the 2012 All-Ireland Senior Football Championship Final against Mayo.

A noted penalty saver, he was named on the "Future Champions 2012" football team.

In 2014, Boyle sustained a cruciate injury. This left him lacking match fitness in 2015 when the chance to play for Donegal presented itself following Durcan's transfer to Dubai.

He made a substitute appearance for Durcan in the second round of 2015 National Football League fixtures against Dublin at Croke Park. He also started the league games against Tyrone and Mayo, as well as the NFL semi-final against Cork.

Ahead of Donegal's 2015 Ulster semi-final, Boyle left the panel to travel to Boston for the summer.

He was "not fit" for the 2016 championship, leaving the goalkeeping position vacant for Mark Anthony McGinley and Peter Boyle. McGinley was selected ahead of Peter Boyle.

== Coaching ==
Boyle assisted Mervyn O'Donnell during Gaoth Dobhair's successful 2018 Donegal Senior Football Championship and Ulster Senior Club Football Championship campaign. Boyle left his position with Gaoth Dobhair ahead of the 2020 season.

He has also been involved with the Donegal under-20 backroom team.

In 2022, he was coaching North London Shmarocks, which included his former Termon teammate Nathan McElwaine.

== Personal life ==
As of 2021, Boyle was employed as a commercial manager in the London office of construction recruitment firm, 3D Personnel.

== Honours ==
Donegal

- All-Ireland Senior Football Championship: 2012
- Ulster Senior Football Championship: 2011, 2012, 2014
- National Football League: 2007

Termon

- Donegal Intermediate Football Championship: 2012

Donegal Boston

- North-East Men's Senior Football Championship: 2015

College

- Sigerson Cup: 2010, 2012

Sporting positions
Preceded by Paul Durcan	Donegal Number One Goalkeeper; 2005	Succeeded by Paul Durcan
Preceded by Paul Durcan	Donegal Number One Goalkeeper; 2009	Succeeded by Paul Durcan
