= Kevin Gillespie (monsignor) =

Irish Roman Catholic priest

The Right Reverend Kevin Monsignor Gillespie
- Native name: Caoimhín Mac Giolla Easpuig
- Church: Catholic Church
- Diocese: Raphoe
- Appointed: 20 August 2018
- Predecessor: Very Rev. Eamonn Kelly

Orders
- Ordination: 1999

Personal details
- Born: Kevin Gillespie; 1972 or 1973 (age 53–54) Gaoth Dobhair, County Donegal, Ireland
- Education: St Eunan's College

The Rt. Rev. Kevin Monsignor Gillespie (/ɡɪˈlɛspi/ ghih-LES-pee; born 1972/3) is an Irish priest who since 20 August 2018 serves as Vicar Forane and Administrator of the Roman Catholic Diocese of Raphoe's Cathedral Parish of Conwal and Leck. Having spent much time at the Vatican and having worked closely with two Popes (Benedict XVI and Francis), the Monsignor has been mentioned as a possible future Bishop of Raphoe.

== Biography ==
Monsignor Gillespie was educated at St Eunan's College. His surname (Gillespie) translates as "Devotee of the Bishop". He is originally from Gaoth Dobhair. The youngest of six children, his eldest sister (Sorcha) visited him each spring during his time in Rome.

Gillespie's ordination came in 1999. Following his ordination at St. Eunan's Cathedral, he returned to his native Gaoth Dobhair where the "people of Gweedore gave a tumultuous and warm welcome to Father Kevin Gillespie." He was posted to the rural parish of Fintown after being ordained. He served there for five years before being appointed to the Cathedral parish in Letterkenny for a further five years. The then Fr. Gillespie served for a time as Director of the Raphoe Diocesan Pilgrimage to Fatima. While based in Letterkenny, Fr. Gillespie recorded the recitation of the Sorrowful Mysteries of the Rosary as part of the CD 'An Paidrín Páirteach.' The CD subsequently earned a gold disc, which was presented to Bishop Philip Boyce on February 1, 2007. Fr. Gillespie moved to Rome in 2008, where he worked for the Congregation for the Clergy. He then returned to Ireland and was based at the Cathedral of St Eunan and St Columba in 2017, where he served as Curate. He was appointed as Administrator of the cathedral by Bishop Alan McGuckian, SJ, in 2018.

While in Rome, Fr. Gillespie pursued doctoral studies in canon law. He led the procession of cardinal electorss into the conclave which chose Jorge Mario Bergoglio to succeed Pope Benedict XVI (and with whom Gillespie also worked closely). Gillespie served as Papal Master of Ceremonies for both popes. He assisted Francis during his first Easter Sunday Mass at St. Peter's Basilica on 31 March 2013. Photographs included in national and international media showed Gillespie standing to the right of Pope Francis. Gillespie had earlier led Holy Thursday Mass at the Pontifical Irish College in Rome. Gillespie was part of the Papal Delegation accompanying Pope Francis during his visit to the Philippines in January 2015 and was also present when Pope Francis declared Mother Teresa a saint in St. Peter's Square in September 2016. He joined Members of the Colloquium of Anglican and Roman Catholic Canon Lawyers at their May 2017 reunion in Rome, following their establishment by the Pontifical University of Saint Thomas Aquinas (Angelicum), the Centre for Law and Religion at Cardiff University and Duquesne University School of Law. He was also involved in the World Meeting of Families 2018, which coincided with Pope Francis's visit to Ireland. He is credited too with exerting his considerable influence to get an Irishwoman into Pope Benedict's funeral and, having achieved this, she was able to give the Second Reading. During the COVID-19 pandemic, Gillespie agreed to celebrate weekday morning Mass for the nation on RTÉ Television.

Following the appointment of Bishop Alan McGuckian to Down and Connor, Monsignor Gillespie was appointed Diocesan Administrator on 20 March 2024. McGuckian took up his new position on 19 March 2024.

== Honours ==
The Vatican has awarded him the title Monsignor.
