= Lurgybrack National School =

- County Donegal; Ireland

Information
- Established: 1927
- Status: Open
- Principal: Annraoi Cheevers
- Campus type: Rural

Lurgybrack National School is an Irish school located in County Donegal. It has been educating students for close to a century. In 2016, it had an intake of nearly 500 students.

Annraoi Cheevers is principal. Among the school's alumni are football goalkeeper Shaun Patton. It is situated on top of a hill. As a result, it is known as the school on "top of the hill".

== History ==
The school was built in 1927. In the 1980s, the school had an intake of approximately 180 students, though this increased to many hundreds as the decades went on, and continues to increase to this day.

Anne Foxe, who would go on to become a future principal of the school, began teaching there in 1982. She was initially covering for another teacher, who had taken maternity leave in order to look after her children. When that teacher later left her position, Foxe took over from her instead, after being given a more permanent role. She initially taught junior infants, doing so for 13 years, before moving on to teach first class. Foxe would eventually ascend to become vice-principal of the school, and, later, she would become principal of the school.

Bryan Harkin retired as principal in 2004. Anne Foxe then took over as principal, having been a teacher at the school since 1982. Anne Foxe retired as principal in June 2016. Mr Annraoi Cheevers succeeded her as principal. Annraoi Cheevers had previously taught at Scoil Mhuire Milford, meaning that, unlike his predecessor Foxe, he had no recent experience of working at the school which he was set to become principal of.

== Development ==
A new school building opened in 2014. A centre dedicated to autism opened in 2015. For many years, prefab classes were in use. These have since been replaced by a "state of the art, modern building". A still persistent problem, though, are the parking facilities. Previously, there was no separate car park for staff to use, which led to difficulties and conflict with parents as they sought what parking spaces were available, but that part of the problem has been resolved by giving the staff their own, separate, car park.

Sports that the school offers include association football, athletics, basketball, GAA and rugby. Non-sporting events that the school offers include art, drama, debating, quizzes and spelling bees. Among the school'x modern facilities are ball courts. A hall, which is used for physical education, is another facility used regularly by the school's students. Previously, there was no hall, and the school found it necessary to borrow other facilities for use during its students' physical education classes. Apart from its many classrooms, the modern school also has five learning support and resource rooms.

== Events and fundraising ==
The association football player Shane Duffy, who plays for, and has also captained, the Republic of Ireland national football team, and who has also played for many clubs in and around England and Scotland, including with Brighton and Hove Albion, Fulham, Norwich City, Blackburn Rovers, Everton, Burnley, Scunthorpe United, Yeovil Town and Celtic, sometimes in the Premier League, visited the school in June 2017, and, while there, he met with the pupils. Actor and producer Danny O'Carroll (widely known for his role as Buster Brady in Mrs. Brown's Boys, a sitcom produced in the United Kingdom by BBC and BBC Studios in partnership with BOC-PIX and Irish broadcaster RTÉ) has a special attachment to the school, and been regularly involved in public fundraising, speaking about the school, and other activities intended to help it with the dedication of his time.

The school has received An Taisce's Green Flag (An Taisce is a charitable non-governmental organisation (NGO) active in the areas of the environment and built heritage). It has five SNAs.

The footballer Shaun Patton, who is known for his goalkeeping abilities, attended the school as a boy.

== See also ==
- Lurgy (river)
