= Mark Anthony McGinley =

Irish association and Gaelic football goalkeeper

Personal information
- Date of birth: 26 March 1990 (age 36)
- Place of birth: Ards, County Donegal, Ireland
- Position: Goalkeeper

Team information
- Current team: Letterkenny Rovers
- Number: 1

Youth career
- 2007–2009: Fanad United

Senior career*
Years	Team	Apps	(Gls)
2009–2014	UCD	75	(0)
2019–2022	Finn Harps	55	(0)
2023–	Letterkenny Rovers		
- * Club domestic league appearances and goals

Mark Anthony McGinley
Personal information
- Native name: Marc Antoin Mag Fhionnghaile (Irish)
- Born: 26 March 1990 (age 36) Ards, County Donegal, Ireland
- Occupation: Secondary school teacher
- Height: 1.85 m (6 ft 1 in)

Sport
- Sport: Gaelic football
- Position: Goalkeeper
Club
Years	Club	Apps (scores)
–2009, 2014–2019, 2022–	St Michael's	4 (0–5)
Inter-county*
Years	County	Apps (scores)
2015–2019	Donegal	19 (0–0)
Inter-county titles
- Ulster titles: 0
- All-Irelands: 0
- NFL: 0
- All Stars: 0
- *Inter County team apps and scores correct as of 6 March 2020.

Mark Anthony McGinley is an Irish footballer who plays as a goalkeeper for Letterkenny Rovers. He has also played Gaelic football for St Michael's and was formerly the number one keeper with his county team, Donegal. He is from Ards, County Donegal.

== Playing career ==
=== Early years ===
McGinley started his association football career with Fanad United in the Ulster Senior League under the management of Ollie Horgan. He kept goal in the club's 2008 FAI Cup run, which took them to the third round before they lost 3–0 to Kildare County. He later joined University College Dublin on a scholarship and played for them in the League of Ireland. On 29 July 2014, he signed with League of Ireland side Finn Harps, where Ollie Horgan was manager, but injury prevented McGinley from playing for the club.

=== Inter-county debut (2015) ===
First featuring for his county's Gaelic football team under the management of Rory Gallagher, McGinley joined the Donegal senior team for the first time in 2015. He was among thirteen new members of the panel announced in late 2014 for Gallagher's first time in charge; others included Ciaran McGinley and Eoin McHugh. He served as a substitute for the All-Ireland winner Paul Durcan, following Michael Boyle's transfer to Boston before the Ulster Senior Football Championship semi-final against Derry; Durcan then transferred to Qatar, leaving the way clear for McGinley to become Donegal's goalkeeper.

=== 2016 ===
McGinley started three games during the 2016 National Football League, playing against Dublin at Croke Park and Monaghan, as well as in the league semi-final in Croke Park, also against Dublin. Gallagher had favoured Peter Boyle in goal for previous league fixtures of that campaign.

McGinley's Championship debut came in the 2016 Ulster Senior Football Championship quarter-final victory over Fermanagh; in goal from the start, he notably saved a Seán Quigley penalty which Neil McGee conceded during first half stoppage time. McGinley retained his place in goal for the semi-final against Monaghan — which Donegal won after a replay, also featuring McGinley in goal. McGinley played in the Ulster final, a narrow two-point loss to Tyrone, the subsequent All-Ireland qualifier defeat of Cork at Croke Park, and the All-Ireland quarter-final loss to Dublin at Croke Park.

=== 2017 ===
McGinley started in goal during many games of Donegal's 2017 National Football League campaign, including Kerry, the draw against Dublin, Monaghan and Mayo — the last of these in which he conceded a penalty which was dispatched by Cillian O'Connor, helping Mayo to a two-point victory.

McGinley started in goal for Donegal in the 2017 Ulster Senior Football Championship quarter-final victory over Antrim and the semi-final loss to Tyrone, as well as the All-Ireland qualifier victories over Longford and Meath before conceding a penalty and receiving a black card in the loss to Galway at Markievicz Park.

=== 2018 ===
Under new manager Declan Bonner, McGinley started in goal during Donegal's opening fixture of the 2018 National Football League campaign against Kerry, only to be injured in the seventeenth minute; Peter Boyle was sent onto the field of play in his place. He then lost his place as first Peter Boyle, and then Shaun Patton, started games in the league.

== Return to Association Football ==
In February 2019, McGinley — by then neglected by the Donegal Gaelic football team and with no place in the side — signed for League of Ireland Premier Division side Finn Harps (under the management of Ollie Horgan, whom McGinley knew from his time with Fanad United). In March 2019, McGinley announced his departure from the Donegal Gaelic football team. He did so after Bonner opted for Patton as his first choice goalkeeper for the league fixture on the weekend of Saint Patrick's Day.

Meanwhile, Harps goalkeeper Ciaran Gallagher sustained a long-term injury while playing against Dundalk, which — McGinley later confirmed — had led to Horgan contacting him.

"I was actually away. It was Easter time and I was in New York. I missed the call. My dad got onto me saying that Ollie had rang him wondering if I had changed my number or what. I wasn't expecting it, but I was delighted to get it, and it was something I was interested in. Soccer up until I joined the Donegal panel was always number one for me. It was an easy enough decision to make".

In April 2019, McGinley featured in his first Finn Harps squad for a league fixture against Sligo Rovers at The Showgrounds. Playing for them by May, against Derry City, McGinley made some critical saves in the first half to keep Finn Harps in the game; however, they lost what was a cup tie after extra-time.

McGinley went on to keep 9 clean sheets for the rest of the 2019 season as he cemented his place as the Finn Harps number one choice, and subsequently signed a new contract for 2020 League of Ireland Premier Division season, as Harps remained in the top division following a victory in the play-off over Drogheda United. He was voted Finn Harps Player of the Season in 2019.

Harps further maintained their Premier Division status in a shortened 2020 season, finishing 8th position in the table, with McGinley playing all 21 league and cup games, as Harps reached the quarter-finals of the FAI Cup in the process. It was Shamrock Rovers knocked the club out of the FAI Cup, McGinley later saying: "We deservingly found ourselves two up… I've been playing football a long time, since I was six years old. And that was the biggest injustice I've felt on a pitch in all my time. It was that bad, for the third penalty, the linesman was in the earpiece of the referee telling him it was no foul. He said it was a dive. He then told the referee the same thing to his face but for whatever reason, he still awarded it… It's something we've always had to contend with here. But it was a really obvious one that night". McGinley helped Harps pick up seven points from a possible nine in October 2020, meaning the club steered clear of the relegation play-offs and finished in their best highest top flight for two decades, McGinley finishing runner-up in the SSE Airtricity League Player of the Month vote and receiving Sports Personality of the Month from the Donegal News. He was also voted Finn Harps Player of the Season for the second consecutive year.

McGinley again committed to Harps for his third season, by signing a new one-year deal in December 2020, ahead of the 2021 League of Ireland Premier Division season. He stayed with Harps until 2022.

=== Letterkenny Rovers ===
McGinley signed for Donegal Junior League side Letterkenny Rovers in 2023. In his first year at the club, they won the First Division title. In April 2025, McGinley won the Donegal League Premier Division with the club.

Sporting positions
Preceded by Paul Durcan	Donegal Number One Goalkeeper; 2016–2018	Succeeded by Peter Boyle
