= Gary Coleman (Gaelic footballer) =

Derry Gaelic footballer

Personal information
- Native name: Gearóid Ó Colmáin (Irish)
- Born: 26 June 1972 (age 54) County Londonderry, Northern Ireland
- Occupation: Postman
- Height: 5 ft 9 in (175 cm)

Sport
- Sport: Gaelic football
- Position: Defender
Clubs
- Years: Club
- 1989–2001 2002–: Magherafelt; Ballymaguigan
Inter-county
- Years: County
- 1992–2002: Derry
Inter-county titles
- Ulster titles: 2
- All-Irelands: 1
- NFL: 4
- All Stars: 1

Gary Coleman (born 26 June 1972) is a Gaelic footballer who played for the Derry county team in the 1990s and early 2000s. He still plays club football with St Trea's GFC Ballymaguigan.

Coleman was part of Derry's 1993 All-Ireland Championship winning side, as well as the 1993 and 1998 Ulster Championship winning teams. For his performances in the 1993 Championship he won an All Star award. While usually playing in defence for Derry, he often played in attack for Magherafelt and current club Ballymaguigan

== Personal life ==
Coleman attended school at St Pius X College, Magherafelt. His father Eamonn was manager of the 1993 Derry team that won the All-Ireland.

Coleman made headlines in 2024 amidst rumours Rory Gallagher (Gaelic footballer) would be reappointed as Derry county football team manager, stating he wouldn't attend any games with him as manager, "And it sets a bad example - and have we no morals in Derry?"

== Inter-county career ==
Regarded as one of the best Derry minor players of all time, Coleman captained Derry minors to two Ulster Minor Championships and an All-Ireland Minor Championship. He also won an Ulster Under-21 Championship medal in 1993.

He was part of Derry's 1993 Ulster Championship and All-Ireland winning team, which beat Cork in the final. Coleman added a second Ulster Championship medal in 1998.

He won four National Football League medals with Derry in 1992, 1995, 1996 and 2000. Coleman and Derry finished runners-up to Offaly in the 1998 National League decider.

== Club career ==
Coleman started his career with O'Donovan Rossa GAC Magherafelt. After moving to his father's home townland of Ballymaguigan a few years ago, Coleman transferred to St. Trea's GFC Ballymaguigan in 2002 and played full forward for the side. He won a Derry Intermediate Football Championship with the club in 2003 and says it as precious and meaningful to him as the All-Ireland medal he won in 1993.

=== Honours ===
- 4 National Football League Division 1 1992 1995 1996 1997 2000
- 2 Ulster Senior Football Championship 1993 1998
- 2 Ulster Minor Football Championship 1989 1990
- 1 Ulster Under-21 Football Championship 1993
- 1 All-Ireland Senior Football Championship 1993
- 1 All-Ireland Minor Football Championship 1989
- 1 All-Star 1993
- 1 Irish News Ulster All-Star 2001
