= Martin Carney =

Irish Gaelic footballer

Martin Cearney
Personal information
- Native name: Máirtín Ó Cearnaigh (Irish)
- Born: 1951 (age 74–75) Bundoran, County Donegal, Ireland
- Occupation: Retired secondary school principal

Sport
- Sport: Gaelic football
Clubs
- Years: Club
- Aodh Ruadh; Castlebar Mitchels
Club titles
- Donegal titles: 2
Inter-county
- Years: County
- 1970–1978 1979–1989: Donegal; Mayo
Inter-county titles
- Connacht titles: 4
- Ulster titles: 2
- All-Irelands: 0
- NFL: 0
- All Stars: 0

Martin Carney (Irish: Máirtín Ó Cearnaigh) is an Irish former Gaelic footballer.

== Early life ==
Carney was born in Bundoran, County Donegal, and grew up in Ballyshannon, He was educated at St Eunan's College, Letterkenny, where he played Gaelic football for the school team. He is the older brother of former college president Michael Carney. He is one of three 20th-century footballers to play for the Donegal county football team while still attending the college; the others were Seamus Hoare and Paul McGettigan.

Another brother, Dermot, was principal at St Ciaran's Community School in Kells. Carney is a nephew of Jackie Carney.

== Sporting career ==
Carney is a former inter-county footballer for Donegal and Mayo.

In 2002 and 2003, he was one of the selection team for the Coca-Cola International Rules Series.

Carney was at one time the favourite to take over from John Maughan as manager of the Mayo senior football side, but quickly ruled himself out of contention. John O'Mahony became manager, with Carney acting as a statistician and video analyst.

He previously managed Mayo's U21 football side, taking them to two All-Ireland finals in 1994 and 1995, both which they failed to win, as the minors did in 1991 also.

In May 2012, the Irish Independent named him in its selection of Donegal's "greatest team" spanning the previous 50 years.

== Media career ==
Following retirement as a player, Carney maintained a national presence as commentator for RTÉ and TV analyst with The Sunday Game.

He went viral after the 2026 All-Ireland SFC final, and responded by stating he was “embarrassed completely”, but that he had got “a big kiss” from a woman "blowing full on" in the middle of it all. The sounds emanating from Carney at full-time were described as being of the sort “that if you heard them in any other scenario, you'd be calling for an ambulance or a very experienced vet”.

== Professional life ==
Carney is former principal at Scoil Mhuire agus Padraig in Swinford.

== Career statistics ==
Team	Season	Provincial		All-Ireland		Total	
Team	Season	Apps	Score	Apps	Score	Apps	Score
Donegal	1971	1	0-01	0	0-00	1	0-01
Donegal	1972	4	1-02	1	1-01	5	2-03
Donegal	1973	0	0-00	0	0-00	0	0-00
Donegal	1974	4	0-06	1	0-00	5	0-06
Donegal	1975	1	0-07	0	0-00	1	0-07
Donegal	1976	1	0-02	0	0-00	1	0-02
Donegal	1977	1	0-07	0	0-00	1	0-07
Donegal	1978	1	0-01	0	0-00	1	0-01
Mayo	1979	1	0-00	0	0-00	1	0-00
Mayo	1980	3	0-06	0	0-00	3	0-06
Mayo	1981	3	1-10	1	0-01	4	1-11
Mayo	1982	1	0-06	0	0-00	1	0-06
Mayo	1983	3	1-08	0	0-00	3	1-08
Mayo	1984	2	0-01	0	0-00	2	0-01
Mayo	1985	2	0-00	2	0-00	4	0-00
Mayo	1986	2	0-00	0	0-00	2	0-00
Mayo	1987	2	0-01	0	0-00	2	0-01
Mayo	1988	3	1-08	1	0-02	4	1-10
Mayo	1989	2	0-00	0	0-00	2	0-00
Total		37	4-66	6	1-04	43	5-70
