= James Finnegan (poet) =

Irish poet

James Finnegan Ph.D
- Séamus Ó Fionnagáin
- Born: Dublin, Ireland
- Occupation: Schoolteacher
- Spouse: Livinia

James Finnegan is a poet and former schoolteacher. His work has appeared in publications such as New Hibernia Review, Cyphers, Poetry Ireland Review and The Irish Times.

== Early life ==
Born in Dublin, Finnegan has a PhD in living educational theory. His father was a foster child, reared in Inverin by an uncle and aunt without progeny of their own, and engendered in his son "a love of the sea/of spoken Irish and Connemara". He also had family in Gort.

== Later life and career ==
Finnegan lives close to the County Donegal town of Letterkenny, and spent many decades teaching at St Eunan's College. Remarkably, given his interests and background, he taught neither English nor Irish, but science. He has married Livinia, to whom he refers in his work.

=== Publications and reception ===
The Patrick Kavanagh Poetry Award has "highly commended" Finnegan's work. Two of his poems won the Irish Times Hennessy Literary Award for New Irish Writing in February 2018. He was shortlisted in the "Emerging Poetry" category in 2019, the final year of the award. He published his first collection — titled Half-Open Door — in 2018, with a foreword by Aosdána member Thomas McCarthy which draws attention to Finnegan's use of double spacing within poems – a Black Mountain poets technique called "the open field". Half-Open Door was launched at the Listowel Writers' Week on 1 June 2018. Among those cited as influences by reviewers and by James Finnegan are Raymond Carver, T. S. Eliot, Günter Grass, Seamus Heaney, Primo Levi, Michael Longley, Czesław Miłosz, Charles Wright, Mary Oliver, Wisława Szymborska, Alice Oswald, Siegfried Sassoon and Tomas Tranströmer. Animals appear often, leading one reviewer to claim that his cat Elsie "has earned a place in the pantheon of cats in Irish poetry alongside Pangur Bán and Yeats's Minnaloushe". A second collection of poems from James Finnegan, The Weather-Beaten Scarecrow, published by Doire Press in September 2022, was shortlisted in the Farmgate Cafe National Poetry Award in April 2023. A new collection A Butterfly and Its Shadow was published with Revival Press in December 2024. The poem 'What Kinds Of Things Do I Like' from this new collection was Poem of the Week in the Ticket magazine in The Irish Times on Sat Jul 27th 2024. As of 2026, Finnegan was working on another collection with the working title I Try Not To Eat Crows.
