= John Gildea =

Irish Gaelic footballer

Personal information
- Native name: Seán Mac Giolla Dé (Irish)
- Born: 27 March 1971 (age 55)

Sport
- Sport: Gaelic football
- Position: Wing-forward/midfield
Clubs
- Years: Club
- 19??–200? 1997 2001: Naomh Conaill; Donegal New York; Donegal Boston
Club titles
- Donegal titles: 1
Inter-county
- Years: County
- 199?–2004: Donegal

John Gildea (born 27 March 1971) is an Irish former Gaelic footballer who played for Naomh Conaill and the Donegal county team.

He is originally from Glenties.

== Playing career ==
Gildea made his championship debut for Donegal as a substitute against Down in 1995. Pat Ward and Michael Gallagher were county footballers when Gildea was "coming through". His early career was troubled; suffering a problem (which turned out to be a Vitamin B12 deficiency) that affected his ability to train, he made no further championship appearances while P. J. McGowan was manager of the county. Gildea then played illegally under an assumed name for Donegal New York in 1997, the illegality due to him officially registering to play in Boston. He was suspended for one year, reduced to six months on appeal. Gildea credited McGowan's successor Declan Bonner for persisting with him through his difficulties. Fourteen hours after the suspension had ended, Bonner started Gildea in the 1997–98 National Football League semi-final at Croke Park; Gildea scored two points but his team lost the game to Offaly.

Gildea featured prominently for his county from 1998 onwards. Having played as a wing-forward against Offaly and against Antrim in the 1998 Ulster Senior Football Championship quarter-final, Bonner moved Gildea into the midfield position where he would make his name when Martin Coll was sent off early on against Cavan in the Ulster semi-final. Donegal won that game, with Gildea outmanoeuvring Dermot McCabe, but the county then lost the Ulster final to a late Joe Brolly goal.

Gildea quit the panel in May 2001, shortly after Bonner's successor as manager, Mickey Moran, controversially substituted him during a championship loss to Fermanagh in Enniskillen; the decision was part of why selector Michael Houston also quit, while Gildea went to the United States to play for Donegal Boston. He vowed to retire after 2002, but carried on. By 2003, Gildea was the most senior player in the county team. He started the first game of Brian McEniff's last spell as Donegal manager, a league defeat to Galway in Tuam in February 2003, during which he scored a point. That year he was an important player during a six-game championship run through the All-Ireland Senior Football Championship qualifiers. He played in the 2003 All-Ireland Senior Football Championship semi-final against Armagh. Gildea continued to play for his county until 2004.

Gildea won a Donegal Senior Football Championship in 2005, his club's first, which came after a replay.

Gildea first met Stephen Rochford, who went on to work with Bonner in his second spell as Donegal manager, during two visits to Australia from twenty years previously.

Gildea is married to Sharon (née Rouse); they have two sons. He lives in Letterkenny.
