= Ballymaguigan =

Village near Lough Neagh, County Londonderry, Northern Ireland

Coordinates: 54.7614°N 6.5061°W

Ballymaguigan: Irish: Baile Mhic Uiginn
- Location within Northern Ireland
- Population: 2,408
- District: Mid-Ulster District
- County: County Londonderry
- Country: Northern Ireland
- Sovereign state: United Kingdom
- Post town: Ballyronan
- Postcode district: BT45
- Dialling code: 028

Ballymaguigan (from Irish Baile Mhic Guaigín, meaning 'McGuigan's townland') is a hamlet and townland in County Londonderry, Northern Ireland. It is near the northwest shore of Lough Neagh, 6 kilometres (4 mi) east of Magherafelt. The hamlet forms one part of a parish named Ardtrea North. Ballymaguigan is part of the Mid-Ulster District.

== Lough Neagh ==
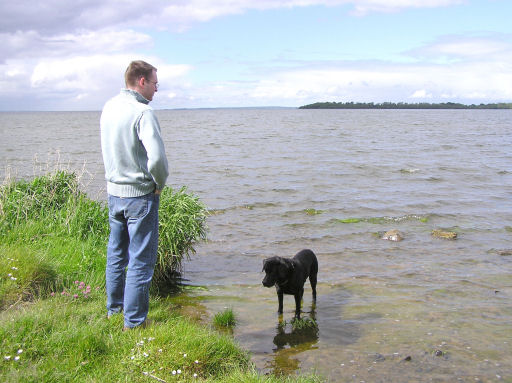
Lough Neagh

Lough Neagh is situated in lower end of Ballymaguigan. It is regarded by fishermen of Ballymaguigan and surrounding areas as one of the best places to obtain eels in Ulster, and is also good for obtaining salmon. Due to its location on the shores of Lough Neagh, this was once the primary source of income for many families in Ballymaguigan.

== University of Ulster campus ==
The University of Ulster used to have a base in Ballymaguigan, located on the Point Road. The university campus tested and treated the waters of Lough Neagh, to treat and look after the wildlife in the lough. The laboratory is now closed and was formerly the largest marine biology center in the UK.

== Sport ==
Gaelic games are the most popular sports in the area, with St. Trea's G.F.C being the local club. Ballymaguigan fields Gaelic football teams at U12, U14, U16, Minor, Reserve, Thirds and Senior levels. There are also Minor and Senior ladies Gaelic football teams.

Prior to 1944 one team catered for the combined interests of Ballymaguigan and Newbridge. When World War II came, Toome Airfield was built, practically dividing the parish in two, thus making it very difficult for the Ballymaguigan players to travel to the pitch in Newbridge for training. Paddy Bateson suggested that a ball be purchased so that the local players could train in Ballymaguigan. From this initial step the beginnings of an independent club became apparent.

== Education ==
There are two primary schools in Ballymaguiagn. Students from Ballymaguigan often attend secondary schools in the neighbouring town of Magherafelt. The schools are within the North Eastern Education and Library Board area.

=== Schools ===
- Anahorish Primary School.
- Saint Trea's Primary School, a Catholic co-educational school. The school opened approximately 108 years ago and educates children aged 4 to 11.

== The Troubles ==
On 18 December 1971 – James Sheridan (20), John Bateson (19) and Martin Lee (18), all from Ballymaguigan died in a premature bomb explosion while traveling in a car at King Street, Magherafelt. The three men all were Catholics and members of the South Derry Brigade of the Provisional Irish Republican Army. The men all came from Ballymaguigan and played for St. Trea's GFC Ballymaguigan. In 1971 the trophy for the Derry Intermediate Football Championship was named after them.

== Roads ==
Shore Road is the main road within Ballymaguigan and is named the Shore Road because it runs along the shore of the lough. The road is about 12 miles (19 km) long and partially runs through the villages of Newbridge, Ballymaguigan, Ballyronan, Ballinderry and Coagh, before becoming the Ballinderry Bridge Road.

A number of other roads run off the right of the Shore Road and eventually these roads end at the lough. These roads are named the (Lower) Waterfoot Road, Moss Road, Lough Road and Point Road.

Barrack Road (Section One) runs from O'Neill's Park to the Gracefield Road.

Barrack Road (Section Two) runs from the middle of the Barrack Road to the beginning of the Ballymaguiagn Road. This road was formerly known as "Charley's Hill".

Ballymaguigan Road almost runs parallel of the Barrack road. It begins just off the left hand side of the Shore Road and forms a cross-roads with the Lough road. The Ballymaguigan road finishes at the Gracefield road.

The Waterfoot Road is actually two roads. It begins just off the left hand side of the Shore Road and forms a cross-roads with the (Lower) Waterfoot Road. The Waterfoot road finishes at the Gracefield road.

O'Neill's Park is named for the housing development of the same name and is located on what is known locally as "The Island Hill". The entrance of this development is just off the Barrack road. The development consists of twenty six houses.

Gracefield Road runs almost parallel to the Shore Road, and is known as "the Morvorians" after the local church and graveyard on the Ballymaguigan Road.

== Notable people ==
- Eamonn Coleman – former Derry manager and footballer.
- Gary Coleman – All Star winning Derry footballer. Son of Eamonn Coleman.
- Jim McKeever – 1958 Footballer of the Year.
- Paddy Crozier – Former Derry manager.
