= Mick McGinley =

Donegal Gaelic footballer

Personal information
- Born: 1940 (age 85–86)

Sport
- Sport: Gaelic football
Club
- Years: Club
- 19??–?: St Eunan's
Inter-county
- Years: County
- 1959–1961: Donegal

Michael "Mick" McGinley (born 1940) is an Irish former Gaelic footballer who played for St Eunan's and the Donegal county team.

== Career ==
McGinley attended St Eunan's College, where he played for the school team and was part of the 1956 MacRory Cup-winning team. He also won a Rannafast Cup with the College in 1956.

He won an Ulster Minor Football Championship title with Donegal in 1956. He played for the Donegal county team at a senior level between 1959 and 1961. At this time McGinley joined the British Merchant Navy.

He worked in telecommunications. Sigma Wireless is the name of his telecommunications company.

McGinley is a business partner of Tony Boyle, who co-owns Persona, which has been involved in a lawsuit against Ireland. Persona lost out to the Esat Digifone consortium of Denis O'Brien in 1995, a series of events which was later detailed during the Moriarty Tribunal. Though Persona is dormant, as of 2023, McGinley and his family continue to provide additional equity for the company.

McGinley introduced Dermot Desmond and Jim McGuinness to each other.

== Personal life ==
McGinley is from Dunfanaghy. Married to Julia from Rathmullan, the couple live in Rathfarnham. Their son, Paul, is a professional golfer. The couple also have a daughter who is a midwife.

McGinley has played in amateur golf tournaments in Ireland, Spain and Portugal. One day, after having often experienced pains in his chest, he had a minor heart attack on the golf course.
