= Dermott Feely =

Fermanagh Gaelic football goalkeeper

Personal information
- Nickname: Peggy

Sport
- Sport: Gaelic football
- Position: Goalkeeper
Clubs
Years	Club	Apps (scores)
1992–2017 1998	Derrygonnelly Harps; Donegal Boston	550
Club titles
- Fermanagh titles: 6
Inter-county
- Years: County
- Fermanagh

Dermott "Peggy" Feely is a former Gaelic footballer who played as a goalkeeper for Derrygonnelly Harps and the Fermanagh county team.

Feely played for his club until he was 42 years old. He won six Fermanagh Senior Football Championships and played more than 500 matches over 25 years.

He also played for Donegal Boston. He went there in the middle of 1998.
