= Glen Burke =

Irish Gaelic footballer

Sport
- Sport: Gaelic football
Clubs
- Years: Club
- Fethard; Donegal Boston
Inter-county
- Years: County
- c. 2000s: Tipperary

Glen Burke is an Irish Gaelic footballer who plays for Fethard and the Tipperary county team.

He also played for Donegal Boston.
