= Shaun Patton =

Donegal Gaelic football goalkeeper

Personal information
- Native name: Seán Ó Peatáin (Irish)
- Born: 1995 (age 30–31)
- Occupations: Full-time professional footballer (former); Retail assistant (former); Garda (current)
- Height: 6 ft 0 in (183 cm)

Sport
- Sport: Gaelic football
- Position: Goalkeeper
Club
- Years: Club
- 2018–: St Eunan's
Club titles
- Donegal titles: 2
Inter-county
- Years: County
- 2018–: Donegal
- Ulster titles: 4

Shaun Patton (born 1995) is an Irish goalkeeper who has played in that position in two different sports. A former professional soccer player in the League of Ireland with Derry City, Finn Harps and Sligo Rovers, Patton changed to Gaelic football in 2018, playing for St Eunan's and the Donegal county team. He has won the Ulster Senior Football Championship four times with Donegal.

== Early life ==
Patton went to primary school at Lurgybrack National School. He attended St Eunan's College for his secondary education. Patton played in a MacLarnon Cup Final for the college. He did so while on the books of Finn Harps, a soccer team. His teammates on an earlier St Eunan's College team (when Patton was 14) included future professional footballer Dale Gorman. He also played for the Republic of Ireland at schoolboy level. He made his League of Ireland debut at the age of 16 before becoming disillusioned with that game at the age of 22 and pursuing Gaelic football instead. He did not attend a third-level institution as he was playing full-time football. He joined Derry City in November 2014 in what was considered a surprise development, though he had lost his position in the Harps team after taking time off to study for his Leaving Certificate the previous year. Michael Murphy employed Patton to work in his shop in Letterkenny. Patton became a Garda in 2020. He was posted to Navan, a town in County Meath. He is from Letterkenny.

== Playing career ==
=== Club ===
Upon being reappointed Donegal Gaelic football manager in 2017, Declan Bonner set about trying to recruit Patton. The goalkeeper had never before played a local league or championship game in the sport of Gaelic football, only appearing for St Eunan's in two Ulster club games against Roslea and Omagh during the 2014–15 All-Ireland Senior Club Football Championship. At the time of Bonner's request, Patton was negotiating the possibility of joining soccer outfit Cork City. He was doing so from a position of having played for one year for Sligo Rovers — where he deputised for Micheál Schlingermann when Schlingermann was injured — and had started 12 games for the Sligo soccer outfit in 2017. Patton said at the time:

"I've committed to the Donegal panel for the foreseeable future. I had offers from two [League of Ireland] clubs and I was chatting with some others, but I've decided that the GAA is the best option for me at the moment. Eventually the chance to play for Donegal was going to stop presenting itself. Now is the right time".

Patton won the 2021 Donegal Senior Football Championship with his club, scoring one point (from a '45) in the final. He then won the 2024 Donegal Senior Football Championship with his club.

=== Inter-county ===
Patton began training with Donegal for the first time in January 2018. He had fractured his ankle the previous October while playing for the Sligo soccer team against an outfit from Drogheda. Under the management of Declan Bonner (second spell), Mark Anthony McGinley was initially the first choice goalkeeper, having been brought in by Bonner's predecessor Rory Gallagher. However, during the opening fixture of the 2018 National Football League against Kerry, McGinley sustained an injury and second choice goalkeeper Peter Boyle came on as a substitute. Boyle then started against Galway in the second league fixture, and again started in the third fixture against Dublin (at Croke Park). Then, in the fourth league fixture against Kildare, manager Declan Bonner opted for Patton as Donegal's first choice goalkeeper, prompting Boyle to quit.

Patton continued in goal for the remainder of the season. He made his Ulster Senior Football Championship debut from the start against Cavan, and played every minute against Derry and Down on the way to the final against Fermanagh, which Donegal won. He then played every minute of Donegal's 2018 All-Ireland challenge, making his Croke Park debut against Dublin in the quarter-final group stage on 14 July 2018, only for Donegal's challenge to come undone against eventual finalists Tyrone.

Patton started the opening game of the National Football League, before briefly alternating with McGinley, until taking over completely as Donegal's first choice goalkeeper when McGinley withdrew from consideration in March due to his reluctance to commit in the competition against Patton.

Patton won his second Ulster Senior Football Championship later that year, again completing every minute of play. He did so while competing against Paul Durcan (regarded as having the sport's closest ability in the goalkeeping position to Stephen Cluxton); Durcan had availed of McGinley's departure to seek a return to Donegal.

== Style ==
Patton's short and long range kick-outs, as well as his and shot-stopping abilities, have garnered him comparisons with Paul Durcan and Stephen Cluxton. His kicks have been likened to "laser darts". RTÉ noted as early as the 2018 Ulster Senior Football Championship victory over Derry that "Patton's long, accurate kick-outs were highly effective in setting Donegal back on the attack". His ability at saving was also on display against Down in the following match, when he used a trailing right boot to prevent a goal from a Donal O'Hare shot. In the next game, the final, Patton showed his saving ability again.

== Honours ==
Donegal

- Ulster Senior Football Championship (4): 2018, 2019, 2024, 2025
- National Football League Division 2 (2): 2019, 2024

St Eunan's

- Donegal Senior Football Championship: 2021, 2024

Individual

- All Star: 0
  - Nominated in 2019, 2024
- Ulster Schools All Star: 1

Sporting positions
Preceded by Mark Anthony McGinley/Peter Boyle	Donegal Number One Goalkeeper; 2018–	Succeeded by Incumbent
