= Fergal McCusker =

Derry Gaelic footballer

Fergal P. McCusker
Personal information
- Born: 16 March 1970 (age 56) County Londonderry, Northern Ireland
- Occupation: Bank manager
- Height: 5 ft 11 in (180 cm)

Sport
- Sport: Gaelic football
- Position: Half back
Club
Years	Club	Apps (scores)
?–2007	Glen	?
Inter-county
- Years: County
- 1988–2000: Derry
Inter-county titles
- Ulster titles: 2
- All-Irelands: 1
- NFL: 3/4?

Fergal P. McCusker is a Gaelic footballer who played for the Derry county team in the 1980s, 1990s and early 2000s. He played club football with Watty Graham's GAC Glen until retiring in 2007.

McCusker was part of Derry's 1993 All-Ireland Championship winning side, as well as the 1993 and 1998 Ulster Championship winning teams. He earned a reputation for his ability to play in either defence or attack.

== Personal life ==
McCusker was born in Maghera and attended St Patrick's College there. His brother Damien was also in the 1993 Derry team that won the All-Ireland. He works as a bank official and also writes a column for the County Derry Post newspaper. In 2007, he lodged a motion at the Derry GAA convention to rename Derry's training complex Owenbeg, to the Eamonn Coleman Centre of Excellence in honour of legendary Derry GAA figure Eamonn Coleman.

Although a founding member of the Gaelic Players Association (GPA) even coining the organisation's name, McCusker has renounced his membership and in a December 2007 meeting in Newbridge, McCusker publicly spoke out against the direction the organisation had taken in over the recent players' grants issue. On one occasion, he almost came to blows with a Newbridge aficionado who voiced his disapproval of the GPA, McCusker wasn't available to comment at the time and the issue has since died.

== Inter-county career ==
Regarded as one of the best Derry minor players of all time, McCusker was called up at age 17 to the Derry's senior team during the 1988 National Football League by then manager Tom Scullion. McCusker made his Derry senior debut that year against Armagh and scored a goal in that match to save Derry from relegation. He was part of Derry's 1993 Ulster Championship and All-Ireland winning team, which defeated Cork in the final.

McCusker added a second Ulster Championship medal in 1998. He won National Football League medals with Derry in 1992, 1995, 1996 and 2000??, and retired from inter-county football in 2000. McCusker and Derry finished runners-up to Offaly in the 1998 National League decider.

In September 2008 McCusker was appointed part of a special selection committee set up by the Derry County Board, to interview the candidates for the vacant Derry Senior, Under 21 and Minor managers' positions in both football and hurling. Following the committee's recommendations, Damian Cassidy was formally ratified as new Derry Senior football manager at the county board meeting on 7 October.

== Club career ==
Among other club titles, McCusker won a Derry Minor Football Championship and Derry Senior League medal with Glen in 1987. He played club football up until 2007 when a serious leg break finished his career.

== Soccer ==
Fergal McCusker also had a brief stint playing soccer for Ballyclare Comrades F.C.
