= Paul Noone (Gaelic footballer) =

Irish Gaelic footballer

Personal information
- Born: c. 1980s

Sport
- Sport: Gaelic football
- Position: Corner-back
Clubs
- Years: Club
- ? Roscommon Gaels, Carrickmacross
Inter-county
- Years: County
- c. 2000s: Roscommon

Paul Noone (born 1979) is a former Gaelic footballer who played for the Roscommon county team.

He won a Connacht Under-21 Football Championship in 1999. He was then part of the team that knocked future All-Ireland champions Galway out of the Connacht Senior Football Championship and into the newly created All-Ireland Senior Football Championship qualifiers.

Noone also played for Donegal Boston.
