= Paul Durcan (Gaelic footballer) =

Donegal Gaelic football goalkeeper (born 1984)

Personal information
- Native name: Pól Ó Durcáin (Irish)
- Nickname: Papa
- Born: 22 April 1984 (age 42) Letterkenny, Ireland
- Occupation: Quantity surveyor
- Height: 6 ft 5 in (196 cm)

Sport
- Sport: Gaelic football
- Position: Goalkeeper
Clubs
Years	Club	Apps (scores)
2000–2015 2015–2016 2019 2020–	Four Masters; Ballyboden St Enda's; Ballyboden St Enda's; Drumcliffe–Rosses Point	100 (0-0)
Club titles
- Dublin titles: 1
- Leinster titles: 1
- All-Ireland Titles: 1
College
- Years: College
- c. 2005: Sligo IT
College titles
- Sigerson titles: 1
Inter-county
- Years: County
- 2004–2015 2019–: Donegal; Donegal
Inter-county titles
- Ulster titles: 3
- All-Irelands: 1
- NFL: 1
- All Stars: 2

Paul Durcan (born 22 April 1984) is an Irish Gaelic footballer and coach who plays as goalkeeper for Drumcliffe–Rosses Point and, formerly, for the Donegal county team.

A member of the Donegal county team (senior) since 2004, he has also played soccer for Finn Harps in the League of Ireland.

Durcan has won two All Stars, one All-Ireland Senior Football Championship, three Ulster Senior Football Championships (2011, 2012 and 2014) and one National Football League with his county.

Until transferring to Ballyboden St Enda's in 2015, Durcan played his club football with Four Masters, with whom he won a Donegal Senior Football Championship in 2003. With Ballyboden St Enda's Durcan won a Dublin Senior Football Championship and Leinster Senior Club Football Championship (both 2015) and then an All-Ireland Senior Club Football Championship in 2016. He lives in County Sligo, and made his championship debut for the Drumcliffe–Rosses Point club in 2020.

== Early life ==
His father John Durcan is a retired garda, originally from Foxford, County Mayo. He watched his son rise through the ranks at Four Masters alongside Karl Lacey and Barry Dunnion, winning numerous underage titles along the way. He said, "He was always an outfield player, until Martin McHugh made a goalkeeper of him for the U16 Ted Webb Cup in 1999. Although he was nine years younger than his brother Adrian and six younger than Sean, they always had Paul in goals, smashing shots at him. They never let him out!" Durcan's heroes include his fellow Donegal goalkeepers Gary Walsh, Packie Bonner and Shay Given. At the age of nine he watched Donegal win the 1992 All-Ireland Senior Football Championship Final, which he later described as the greatest game he had ever been to in any sport.

== Playing career ==
=== Club ===
Durcan originally played his club football for Four Masters, sometimes playing outfield for the club. His club achievements include winning the 2003 Donegal Senior Football Championship.

In 2015, he transferred to Ballyboden St Enda's, the paperwork going through on 10 April. That team also featured his cousin, Robbie McDaid. It was McDaid who put Durcan in touch with the Firhouse Road club. Durcan later explained: "I decided to play with Ballyboden to cut a bit of time coming and going from Donegal. I was up there all weekend for club and county but when I switched clubs I had more time around the weekends. I had been living on the northside but I had the connection with Ballyboden through Robbie. Then (manager) Andy McEntee rang me himself. Robbie, I suppose, may have said something to him. I met Andy, I got on well with him and he brought me around the club." Durcan dislodged fellow goalkeepers Darragh Gogan and Conor Dooley to win Dublin and Leinster titles in 2015 and an All-Ireland Club Championship in 2016.

He joined Drumcliffe–Rosses Point and made his championship debut against Tubbercurry at Connolly Park in Collooney on 1 August 2020, playing in the club's first Sligo Senior Football Championship final the following month (lost to Tourlestrane).

=== College ===
Durcan notably saved two penalties for Sligo IT during the 2005 Sigerson Cup, the first in the semi-final and the second in the final.

=== Inter-county ===
Durcan was called up to the Donegal senior football team on the back of club success with The Four Masters. He made his inter-county debut in a 2004 league game against Monaghan in Ballyshannon.

At this time, Tony Blake was Donegal's established first choice goalkeeper. Durcan deputised for Blake and then saw off the challenge of Sean Sweeney to take over when Blake was forced to retire due to a persistent knee injury in May that year. Gary Walsh coached Durcan and Sweeney at this time, having been called in by Donegal manager Brian McEniff.

Durcan played against Armagh in the 2004 Ulster final at Croke Park. He played in the 2006 Ulster final against the same opponents at the same venue. He was part of the Donegal team that won the 2007 National Football League.

Michael Boyle would later rival Durcan, occasionally taking his place on the first team. That was just what happened in a 2009 All-Ireland SFC qualifier — after Durcan fouled Clare player Gary Brennan and conceded a penalty, Boyle was sprung from the bench at half-time. Boyle retained his starting place for the games against Galway at Markievicz Park and Cork at Croke Park.

He played more league and championship matches under Jim McGuinness's management than any other player.

On 30 June 2012, in the Ulster semi-final against Tyrone, Durcan received much credit after putting Donegal into the final with his outstretched foot. Donegal were three points ahead and it was practically the last action of the game. Durcan went low to his left and deflected Martin Penrose's shot out off the post for a 45'. The save was compared to that of Gordon Banks against Pelé at the 1970 FIFA World Cup. Tyrone manager Mickey Harte said Durcan's last-gasp goal-saving intervention had denied Tyrone a replay. Durcan would later describe it as the most important save of his career. It enabled Donegal to retain their Ulster title they had won in 2011 (a first back-to-back success in team history), and the team went unbeaten through the 2012 All-Ireland Senior Football Championship, defeating Mayo in the 2012 All-Ireland Senior Football Championship Final to claim the Sam Maguire Cup. Durcan won an All Star and attended the Football Tour of New York.

In 2013, Durcan made his 100th appearance for Donegal in the county's third 2013 National Football League game against Tyrone at Healy Park. In the following game he contributed to Donegal's defeat of the mighty Kerry by saving a penalty. In the Championship he helped his team to a third consecutive Ulster final.

2014 brought a third Ulster senior title and another extended run of games in the Championship. Somewhat unusually, he scored an own goal in the 2014 All-Ireland quarter-final defeat of Armagh at Croke Park.

He was involved in a traffic collision during the 2015 National Football League campaign, though his injuries were not severe.

After his team exited the 2015 championship, Durcan announced he would be moving to Qatar.

In 2019, Durcan returned home from Qatar sporting a long grey beard and rejoined the Donegal panel to contest for a place against Shaun Patton and Michael Lynch. He was reported to be living in Sligo since returning from Qatar.

== Training regime ==
Though based in Dublin as a Quantity Surveyor with Errigal Contracts, Durcan tries to get back to Donegal several times a week for training. On several occasions he has made use of a passing helicopter to fly home. The journey by road is an eight-hour round trip and during the successful Jim McGuinness era he would make this trip once every week then train at other times in Dublin with strength and conditioning coach Eugene Eivers.

His influence has been likened to that of Peter Schmeichel. His restarts and shot stopping have been compared to those of Stephen Cluxton.

He regards Cluxton as the benchmark for goalkeepers and also admires Gianluigi Buffon.

== Coaching ==
In December 2020, it was announced that Durcan would serve as goalkeeping coach under newly appointed Sligo senior manager Tony McEntee.

== Personal life ==
Durcan is a former employee of construction recruitment firm, 3D Personnel.

== Honours ==
Donegal

- All-Ireland Senior Football Championship: 2012
- Ulster Senior Football Championship: 2011, 2012, 2014
- Dr McKenna Cup: 2009, 2010
- National Football League Division 1: 2007
- National Football League Division 2: 2011
- All-Ireland Vocational Schools Championship 2002

Four Masters

- Donegal Senior Football Championship: 2003

Ballyboden St Enda's

- All-Ireland Senior Club Football Championship: 2016
- Leinster Senior Club Football Championship: 2015
- Dublin Senior Football Championship: 2015

College

- Sigerson Cup: 2005, 2006

Individual

- All Star: 2012, 2014
  - Nominated in 2011, 2015
- Irish News Ulster All Star: 2012
- The Sunday Game Team of the Year: 2012, 2014

Sporting positions
Preceded by Tony Blake	Donegal Number One Goalkeeper; 2004	Succeeded by Michael Boyle
Preceded by Michael Boyle	Donegal Number One Goalkeeper; 2006–2008	Succeeded by Michael Boyle
Preceded by Michael Boyle	Donegal Number One Goalkeeper; 2010–2015	Succeeded by Mark Anthony McGinley
