= Eamonn Coleman =

Gaelic football manager

Personal information
- Born: 1947 Ballymaguigan, County Londonderry, Northern Ireland
- Died: 11 June 2007
- Occupation: Builder

Sport
- Sport: Gaelic football
- Position: Forward
Clubs
- Years: Club
- 1962–19xx 19xx–198x 197x–198x: Ballymaguigan; Ballinderry; Athlone
Club titles
- Derry titles: 2 Westmeath SFC 2
- Ulster titles: 0/1?
Inter-county
- Years: County
- 1970s: Derry
Inter-county titles
- Ulster titles: 1

Eamonn Coleman (1947 or 1948 – 11 June 2007) was a Gaelic football manager who had previously played for the Ballymaguigan club and the Derry county team.

He had two separate stints as manager of the senior Derry county team, and his chief success was guiding the county to the victory in the 1993 All-Ireland Championship – Derry's first ever All-Ireland Senior Football Championship title. He also had spells as manager of the Armagh, Cavan and Longford county teams, as well as various club sides.

== Personal life ==
He was born in the small County Londonderry townland of Ballymaguigan in Northern Ireland, on the western shores of Lough Neagh in 1947 or 1948. His son Gary, was also a talented footballer and was left half back on the victorious 1993 Derry team; also winning an All Star for his performances that year.

== Playing career ==
=== Inter-county ===
Coleman was part of the Derry minor team that won the Ulster Minor and All-Ireland Minor Championships in 1965, beating Cavan and Kerry in the respective finals.

He won an Ulster Under 21 Championship medal with Derry under-21s in 1967. The following year the team defended their Ulster Championship and went on to win the All-Ireland Under-21 Football Championship; beating Offaly in the final.

Coleman soon progressed into the senior team and in 1970 helped Derry win the Dr McKenna Cup and Ulster Senior Football Championship. He won a second McKenna Cup medal in 1971. The same side won the Wembley Tournament in both these years.

=== Club ===
At underage level Coleman competed for Ballinderry as there was no underage teams in Ballymaguigan. He was first asked into the Ballymaguigan senior side at just 14 years of age in 1962. That year as a 14/15-year-old he won the Derry Senior Football Championship with the club, scoring 1–2 in the final replay against Castledawson. Ballymaguigan also won that year's Derry League title. He later helped the club to win Derry Junior and Derry Intermediate Championships in 1969 and 1971.

Coleman played for Ballinderry in the early 1980s and won a second Derry Championship medal in 1981.

While working in County Westmeath, Coleman lined out for Athlone, with whom he won two Westmeath Senior Football Championships in 1979 and 1982.

== Managerial career ==
Eamonn Coleman
Sport
Club management
- Years: Club
- Late 1970s Late 1980s Late 1980s 1990s & Early 2000s: Kildress; UUJ; Round Towers; Gowna
| | n/a 1; 5 | n/a – – | 2 – – |
Inter-county management
- Years: Team
- Early 1980s Mid 1980s 1991–1994 1999–2002 1996– Mid 2000s: Derry Minors; Derry U-21s; Derry Longford; Cavan / Cavan U-21s
Inter-county titles as manager
| County | League | Province | All-Ireland |
| Derry Minors Derry U-21s Derry | 1 - 1 | 2; 1; 1 | 2; 1; 1 |

=== Inter-county ===
In 1983 he led the Derry minor side to success in the Ulster Minor and All-Ireland Minor Football Championships. Four of this team would be in his senior winning panel ten years later. They defended the Ulster title with Coleman at the helm in 1984.

He led Derry under 21s to victory in the 1985 Ulster Under-21 Football Championship. In 1989 he became Armagh manager alongside Fr. Sean Hegarty.

He took over as Derry senior manager in November 1990. In November 1990 Derry were managerless and the Derry County Board rang Coleman and asked him to return home to manage Derry. When he took on the Derry job, the team was languishing in Division 3 of the National Football League. After consecutive promotions, he achieved his first national trophy as Derry senior manager by winning the NFL in 1992. Anthony Tohill scored a late winning goal for Derry in a two-point victory over neighbours Tyrone.

The following year Coleman later guided Derry to their best ever year, winning both Ulster and All-Ireland Championships. After beating Donegal in the Ulster Senior Football Championship final, he led Derry to success in the 1993 All-Ireland Championship, beating Dublin in the semi-final and Cork in the final 1–14 to 2–08. Fergal P. McCusker who was on the All-Ireland winning side said "The Derry team would not have been brought together without his skills. He stitched a bunch of guys together and we would have gone through brick walls. We'd have done anything for him. He was the man that inspired you to go that extra yard".

Despite his success with Derry in 1993, he was removed as the manager in 1994 after a loss against Down, a game which was described by many as the greatest match of all time. GAA journalist John Haughey described the Derry Board's decision to sack Coleman as "both disgraceful and shortsighted". Many claim if he had been allowed to remain, Derry would have won at least one more All-Ireland in the mid-1990s. He was replaced by Mickey Moran, who had been his assistant.

He managed the Longford team from August 1995 until May 1997 and thereafter Coleman drifted into club management in County Cavan.

Alongside Adrian McGuckin, Coleman replaced former Dublin footballer Brian Mullins as Derry manager in 1999 and steered Derry to another National League title in 2000. In 2001 Derry reached the All-Ireland semi-final but were beaten by Galway. Coleman won Personality of the Year at the 2001 Ulster GAA Writer's Association Awards, having previously won the award in 1993. He stood down as Derry manager in 2002.

In 2003 Coleman became manager of Cavan, but was forced to stand down in 2005, after becoming ill. In 2005 he led Cavan under 21s to the Ulster Under 21 Championship final, but they were defeated by Down.

Despite going through chemotherapy at the time, Coleman came into the Derry dressing room before Derry's opening game of the 2006 Championship against reigning All-Ireland champions Tyrone. Joe Brolly said "He delivered a thundering oration and with all the Derry boys, the hairs were standing up on the back of the necks. It was a genuinely motivational speech and to think that just a year on, he's gone. It's very distressing." Derry went on to beat Tyrone comfortably.

=== Club ===
Coleman was manager of the Kildress team that won the 1978 Tyrone Intermediate Football Championship.

He emigrated to England to look for work in the late 1980s. He managed the Round Tower's club that won the London Senior Football Championship in 1987.

Coleman led Cavan club side Gowna to five Cavan Senior Football Championship titles – 1996, 1997, 1999, 2000 and 2002.

=== College ===
In the late 1980s Coleman was a key figure in the University of Ulster, Jordanstown (UUJ) Sigerson Cup breakthrough team. Along with Belfast man Charlie Sweeney, "wee Eamonn" steered Jordanstown to inter-varsity wins in 1986 and 1987. The team featured Dermot McNicholl and Enda Gormley, who would both be part of Derry's 1993 All-Ireland winning side.

== Death ==
Eamonn Coleman died on 11 June 2007 after a long battle with Non-Hodgkin lymphoma, aged 59.

1958 Texaco Footballer of the Year Jim McKeever described Coleman as a "very significant figure in football in Ireland". Monaghan manager Martin McElkennon, who was coach with Coleman with Cavan and in his second term at Derry said "Eamonn Coleman was a one-off. I would have trusted him with my life".

== Memorial match ==
A memorial match between the 1993 Derry team and a rest of Ireland select was organised for 7 June 2008 in St. Trea's Ballymaguigan. It was organised to honour Coleman's memory and raise money for five charities (Marie Curie Cancer Care, Foyle Hospice, SMA Fathers, GOAL and Adoption UK). A post-match dinner was also held to raise money with 64 tables of ten, each costing £1,000. A total of £52,500 was raised. Chairman of the Eamonn Coleman Memorial Fund Committee was Eamonn's son Gary.

| Preceded by Brian McEniff | All-Ireland-winning football manager 1993 | Succeeded by Pete McGrath |
| Preceded by Fr. Seán Hegarty | Derry Senior Football Manager; 1991–1994 | Succeeded by Mickey Moran |
| Preceded by Brian Mullins | Derry Senior Football Manager; 1999–2002 | Succeeded by Mickey Moran |
