= Kevin McMenamin =

Irish Gaelic footballer and convicted criminal

Kevin McMenamin is an Irish Gaelic footballer. He has played at senior level for Donegal and London county teams, as well as club football for Termon, Tír Chonaill Gaels and Donegal Boston.

His nickname is "Wappa".

He has 34 criminal convictions, including a conviction for dangerous driving causing serious bodily harm for which he received a prison sentence and a driving ban. He also has convictions for drink driving and driving without insurance.

A man of a "pint-sized" disposition, McMenamin was born in Belfast. He was included in the Antrim under-21 panel but progressed no further until Donegal came calling. He is a Tennent's GAA Writers Monthly Merit Award winner, having picked up the award after just three games at inter-county level with Donegal. He scored a goal in the 2007 National Football League semi-final against Kildare at Croke Park that gave Donegal a 1–13 to 1–11 win (i.e., a two-point victory).

McMenamin left the Donegal squad during the 2009 National Football League. In May that year he left for London in search of work, transferred from Termon to Tír Chonaill Gaels and made his debut for London as a substitute in a challenge game with Waterford in Waterford and then played in that year's Connacht Senior Football Championship game against Galway in Ruislip. His Termon clubmates Declan and Mark Alcorn were already with Tír Chonaill Gaels when he arrived.

He also played for Donegal Boston.
