= Ronan Gallagher =

Irish Gaelic footballer

Sport
- Sport: Gaelic football
- Position: Goalkeeper
Clubs
- Years: Club
- Erne Gaels; Madden Raparees GAC; St Gall's
Club titles
- All-Ireland Titles: 1 (St Gall's)
Inter-county
- Years: County
- 2001–2013: Fermanagh

Ronan Gallagher is a former Gaelic footballer who played as a goalkeeper for Fermanagh between 2001 and 2013 and won an All-Ireland Senior Club Championship with St Gall's in 2010.

== Intercounty ==
Gallagher made his debut against Donegal in the 2001 Ulster Championship and was part of the Fermanagh team which made a run to the All-Ireland semi-final in 2008.

He featured in the 2008 Ulster Final and won an Irish News All-Star in the same year.

== Club ==
Gallagher started his career with his home club Erne Gaels, before moving to St Gall's where he featured in the 2006 and 2010 All-Ireland Club Finals, winning the latter. He later transferred to Madden Rapareess.

== Honours ==
- All-Ireland Senior Club Championship (1): 2010
- Irish News All-Stars (1): 2008
