= Ardtrea North =

Parish in Armagh, Northern Ireland

Coordinates: 54.754°N 6.599°W

Ardtrea North is the official name of Newbridge parish, the first parish (geographically) in the Roman Catholic and Church of Ireland diocese of Armagh. The Parish also incorporates the breakaway community of Ballymaguigan.

== Education and worship ==
The parish has one chapel named St. Trea's Church Newbridge, and has two primary schools named Anahorish and Saint Trea's Primary School. Ardtrea's parish saint is Saint Trea. The Church of Ireland community is served by St. Andrew's Ardtrea

Anahorish Primary School is the name of the primary school in Newbridge, with Seamus Heaney being a past pupil of this highly rated primary school.

St. Trea's Primary School is attended by people from the Ballymaguigan side of the parish. In 2003 the North Eastern Education and Library Board tried to merge the two primary schools due to falling numbers at St. Trea's Primary School.

== Sport ==
The parish has two Gaelic football teams. The first Gaelic team is named Seán O'Leary's GAA, Newbridge. The second team is named Saint Trea's Ballymaguigan GFC and is mainly supported by people from the breakaway Ballymaguigan part of the parish.

== People ==
Seamus Heaney, the famous Irish Poet, was a past pupil of Anahorish primary school in Newbridge.

Eamon Coleman, manager of Derry Senior Football All-Ireland winning team (1993) was born in Ballymaguigan.

Thomas Meredith is the subject of two ghost stories relating to his death at the Church of Ireland Rectory of Ardtrea.
