= Mickey Moran =

Irish Gaelic football player and manager

Personal information
- Born: Maghera, County Londonderry, Northern Ireland
- Occupation: Teacher

Sport
- Sport: Gaelic football
- Position: Forward / Back
Club
- Years: Club
- 19??–19??: Glen
Inter-county
- Years: County
- 1970–1982: Derry
Inter-county titles
- Ulster titles: 3
- All-Irelands: 0
- NFL: 0
- All Stars: 0

Mickey Moran is a former Gaelic footballer and manager-coach, who has been manager of Kilcoo since 2019, with a background as an inter-county manager who most recently managed the Leitrim county team. He played at senior level for the Derry county team in the 1970s and early 1980s, and played his club football for Watty Graham's Glen. He is the first man to manage five different counties (two more men, Mick O'Dwyer and John Maughan, have since followed).

Moran is known to be one of the best trainers / coaches in the game and was part of the managerial backroom staff of Derry's 1993 All-Ireland Senior Football Championship-winning team, as coach of the side.

In his managerial career he has had three stints managing Derry and has also managed Sligo, Donegal, Mayo and Leitrim. He has also been in charge of various club sides and the Jordanstown university team. On 26 November 2011, he retired as Leitrim manager on health grounds.

His son Conleth was on the Derry minor side that won the 2002 Ulster Minor and All-Ireland Minor Championships.

== Playing career ==
=== Inter-county ===
Moran was a very versatile player, evidenced by the fact he started left corner forward on Derry's victorious Ulster Championship team in 1975, and left half back when Derry successfully defended their Ulster title a year later. Moran was part of the Derry team that were beaten by Dublin a point in the 1975–76 National League final.

In 1978, he was chosen as an All Star replacement.

He won Derry Intermediate Championship medals with Glen in 1980 and 1983.

== Managerial career ==
Mickey Moran
Sport
Club management
- Years: Club
- 198x-19xx 200x-200x ?-2008 2013 2014–2018 2019–2022: Omagh St Enda's; Creggan; Jordanstown; Kilrea; Slaughtneil; Kilcoo
	4	2
Inter-county management
- Years: Team
- 1980/1?-1984 1995 1996–2000 2001–2002 2003–2005 2006 2008–2011: Derry; Derry; Sligo; Donegal; Derry; Mayo; Leitrim

Moran was Derry manager in the early 1980s at a young age. He was 29 years old and still a player when he took over the Derry managerial reins in 1980/81?.

He was manager of Omagh St Enda's when they won the 1988 Tyrone Senior Football Championship.

When Eamonn Coleman was announced as Derry manager in September 1990/91?, Moran was appointed coach of the team. The duo helped lead Derry to the 1992 National League title, defeating Tyrone in the final. The following year Derry won the Ulster Championship and went on to win the county's first ever All-Ireland Championship. He is famed for his rousing half-time speech in the All-Ireland semi-final victory over Dublin.

Following the controversial sacking of Coleman after the 1994 campaign, Moran was appointed Derry manager in September 1994. Under his leadership, Derry won the 1994/95 National League, but they were knocked out of the 1995 Ulster Championship at the semi-final stage and he quit soon after. Moran was in charge of Sligo for four seasons (1996–2000) and the county "made huge strides" under his leadership, including reaching the 1997 Connacht Senior Football Championship final.

"We did not produce the football we are capable of although the lads gave everything." "I thank them for all the support they have given us. This is the most enjoyable set-up I have ever been involved with."

— Mickey Moran after Kerry emphatically defeated Mayo in the 2006 All-Ireland Senior Football Championship Final

Straight after managing Sligo, Moran with John Morrison as assistant was appointed as Donegal manager for the 2001, 2002 and 2003 seasons. During his tenure selector Michael Houston quit after a public falling out with Moran. Moran's first year in charge of Donegal was a disappointing one, but 2002 was more successful, leading Donegal to the Ulster final (where they were beat by Armagh) and then to the All-Ireland quarter-final against Dublin. However, in September 2002 he informed the county board he would not be staying for the third year of the term. He was immediately linked with the vacant Derry job. His third spell as Derry manager was from 2003 to 2005. He led Derry to the 2004 All-Ireland semi-final, but they were defeated by Kerry. He was also appointed manager of Derry Under 21s at the time.

Moran was appointed manager of Mayo in October 2005. In his first season in charge he won the Connacht Championship and guided Mayo to the 2006 All-Ireland final after a brilliant comeback against Dublin in the semi-final proving one of the Championship highlights. They were beaten by Kerry in the final. He stood down as Mayo boss a few weeks later, a few days after assistant John Morrison had stood down.

He was linked with the vacant Kildare position in September 2007, but the job eventually went to Kieran McGeeney. Moran was appointed Leitrim manager on 25 August 2008 ahead of the 2009 season, once again to be assisted by John Morrison. He resigned suddenly as Leitrim boss in late 2011, citing ill health as his reason, having already drawn up his plans for the 2012 season.

Moran was manager/coach of the Jordanstown football team for a number of years and along with Adrian McGuckin guided the university to victory in the 2008 Sigerson Cup. He has since stepped down following that success.

Sporting positions
Preceded by Frank Kearney; Eamonn Coleman; Eamonn Coleman	Derry Senior Football Manager; 1980/1? – 1984; 1995; 2003 – 2005	Succeeded by Tom Scullion; Brian Mullins; Paddy Crozier
Preceded by ?	Sligo Senior Football Manager; 1996–2000	Succeeded by Peter Ford
Preceded by Declan Bonner	Donegal Senior Football Manager; 2001–2002	Succeeded by Brian McEniff
Preceded by John Maughan	Mayo Senior Football Manager; 2006	Succeeded by John O'Mahony
Preceded by Dessie Dolan	Leitrim Senior Football Manager; 2008–2011	Succeeded by Barney Breen/George Dugdale
