= 2025 Tyrone Intermediate Football Championship =

Gaelic football tournament

2025 Connollys of Moy Tyrone Intermediate Football Championship
Tournament details
- County: Tyrone
- Province: Ulster
- Level: Intermediate
- Year: 2025
- Trophy: Paddy Cullen Cup
- Sponsor: Connollys Of Moy
- Date: 4 September – 19 October 2025
- Teams: 16

Winners
- Champions: Clonoe
- Captain: Declan McClure
- Qualify for: Ulster Club IFC

Runners-up
- Runners-up: Eglish

The 2025 Tyrone Intermediate Football Championship is the 64th edition of Tyrone GAA's second tier Gaelic football tournament for Intermediate clubs in County Tyrone, Ireland.

The championship consists of 16 teams in a straight knock-out format.

The draw for the 2025 championship took place on Wednesday 25th June 2025.

There was a new draw after each round to determine pairings for the subsequent round.

The draw for the Quarter-Finals took place at Páirc an Locha, Loughmacrory on Sunday 7th September 2025.

The draw for the Semi-Finals took place at O'Neill Park, Dungannon on Sunday 21st September 2025.

The Semi-Finals were originally scheduled to be played on Friday 3rd October but were refixed for Sunday 5th October due to Storm Amy.

== Team changes ==
The following teams have changed division since the 2024 championship season.

Promoted from 2024 Intermediate Division

- Derrylaughan Kevin Barry's (Intermediate Championship Winners)
- Gortin St. Patrick's (All-County League Division 2 Winners)
- Moortown St. Malachy's (All-County League Division 1/2 Playoff Winner)

Relegated to 2025 Intermediate Division

- Clonoe O'Rahilly's (All-County League Division 1/2 Playoff Loser)
- Coalisland Fianna (All-County League Division 1 Playoff Loser)
- Eglish St. Patrick's (16th in All-County League Division 1)

Promoted from 2024 Junior Division

- Killeeshil St Mary's (Junior Championship Winners)
- Drumquin Wolfe Tones (All-County League Division 3 Winners)
- Aghaloo O'Neill's (All-County League Division 2/3 Playoff Winner)

Relegated to 2025 Junior Division

- Cookstown Fr. Rock's (All-County League Division 2/3 Playoff Loser)
- Clogher Eire Óg (All-County League Division 2 Playoff Loser)
- Drumragh Sarsfields (16th in All-County League Division 2)

== Bracket ==
Round 1
Naomh Eoghan | 0-11
Kildress | 0-13
Greencastle | 2-11
Clonoe | 1-21
Beragh | 1-18 (5-14)
Drumquin | 1-18 (1-10)
Aghaloo | 1-20
Fintona | 1-15
Eglish | 0-25
Coalisland | 1-19
Stewartstown | 0-07
Owen Roes | 1-17
Moy | 1-19
Aghyaran | 1-07
Killeeshil | 0-11
Rock | 1-18

Quarter-finals
Kildress | 0-12
Clonoe | 1-19
Beragh | 1-14
Aghaloo | 0-20
Eglish | 1-19
Owen Roes | 2-10
Moy | 1-19
Rock | 2-09

Semi-finals
Clonoe | 1-18
Aghaloo | 0-09
Eglish | 2-19
Moy | 1-14

Final
Clonoe | 2-13
Eglish | 1-14

Notes
The above bracket may change depending on the new draw made after each round.

Match Programmes for the 2025 Championship can be viewed here: https://tyronegaa.ie/club-championship-2025/programmes/

== Round 1 ==
| 3 September 2025 Round 1 | Naomh Eoghan | 0-11 – 0-13 | Kildress | Omagh |
| 7:15PM | Ryan Mayse 0-4, Tiarnan Mayse 0-3, Eoin Devine 0-2, Conal McConomy and Aidan McSorley 0-1 each. | Report | Shea Quinn 0-5, Cormac Loughran 0-3, Shea Loughran 0-2, Corey Holland, Johnny Connolly and Shea Treacy 0-1 each. | Stadium: Healy Park; Referee: Cathal Bell (Killeeshil) |

| 4 September 2025 Round 1 | Eglish | 0-25 – 1-19 | Coalisland | Dungannon |
| 7:15PM | Ethan Jordan 0-17 (5x2pt), Matthew Og McGleenan 0-2 (1x2pt), Conor Holmes, Conall McNulty, Nathan Horsfield, Luke Donnelly, Dan Muldoon and Turlough Muldoon 0-1 each. | Report | Tiarnan Quinn 1-3, Cormac O’Hagan 0-5 (2x2pt), Donal Sheeran 0-4, Sean L Corr 0-2 (1x2pt), Bailey Leonard, Mark Hamilton, Niall Devlin, Ruairi McHugh and Fionn McHugh 0-1 each. | Stadium: O'Neill Park; Referee: Fergal Ward (Errigal Ciarán) |

| 5 September 2025 Round 1 | Aghaloo | 1-20 – 1-15 | Fintona | Omagh |
| 6:45PM | Jody McGlone 0-6 (1x2pt), Niall McElroy 0-6, Ruairi McGlone 1-1, James O’Hara 0-3 (1x2pt), Connor Quinn and Conor Mullen 0-2 each. | Report | Aaron McCarney 0-8 (3x2pt), Cathal Starrs 1-0, Niall Donnelly 0-2 (1x2pt), Mark McGlinn 0-2 (1x2pt), Eugene Colton, Jared Brogan and Caolan Donnelly 0-1 each. | Stadium: Healy Park; Referee: Cathal McCrory (Greencastle) |

| 5 September 2025 Round 1 | Stewartstown | 0-07 – 1-17 | Owen Roes | Omagh |
| 8:15PM | Gareth Devlin 0-4, Dan Lowe 0-2, Macauley Quinn 0-1. | Report | Cathal McShane 0-9, Dara Dooher 1-1, Conn Tinney 0-2, Aidan Hegarty 0-2, Damien McCrossan 0-2 (1x2pt), Adam Coyle 0-1. | Stadium: Healy Park; Referee: Martin McErlain (Clonoe) |

| 6 September 2025 Round 1 | Killeeshil | 0-11 – 1-18 | Rock | Stewartstown |
| 6:15PM | Ciaran Reilly 0-3 (1x2pt), Packie McMullan 0-2, Cahill Rafferty and Michael O’Neill (0-2, 1x2pt each), Tomás Hoy and Conall Monaghan 0-1 each. | Report | Shane Murphy 0-7 (2x2pt), Liam Nugent 0-5 (1x2pt), Aidan McGarrity 1-2, Thomas Mackle 0-3 (1x2pt), Caolan Chada 0-1. | Stadium: Mullaghmoyle Park; Referee: Niall Conlan (Moortown) |

| 7 September 2025 Round 1 | Beragh | 1-18 – 1-18 | Drumquin | Killyclogher |
| 1:00PM | Oisin Donnelly 1-6, Conor Owens 0-8, Martin Rodgers 0-1, Jack Campbell, Darragh McKenna, and Sean McCann 0-1 each. | Report | Sean McDonagh 1-8 (2x2pt), Oisin Gormley 0-6 (2x2pt), Stephen Gormley 0-2 (1x2pt), Finnen Patterson 0-1 and Oisin McMenamin 0-1 each. | Stadium: Ballinamullan; Referee: Michael Kelly (Urney) |

| 7 September 2025 Round 1 | Greencastle | 2-11 – 1-21 | Clonoe | Killyclogher |
| 2:45PM | Cahir McCullagh 1-4 (1x2pt), Sean Warnock 1-1, Miceal McCann 0-2 (1x2pt), Sean Fox 0-2, Sean Conneely and Daniel Tuohey 0-1 each. | Report | Connor McAliskey 0-12 (2x2pt), Fintan McClure 1-2, Danny McNulty 0-4, Tommy Taggart 0-2 (1x2pt), Ryan Quinn 0-1. | Stadium: Ballinamullan; Referee: Shane Meehan (Glenelly) |

| 7 September 2025 Round 1 | Moy | 1-19 – 1-07 | Aghyaran | Loughmacrory |
| 6:00PM | Michael Conroy 1-8 (1x2pt), Liam McGeary 0-3, Ryan Coleman 0-3, Matthew Laverty 0-2 (1x2pt), Declan Conroy, Patrick McGeary and Jamie Coleman 0-1 each. | Report | Benny Gallen 0-6 (1x2pt), Eoghan McHugh 1-0, Ethan McHugh 0-1. | Stadium: Páirc an Locha; Referee: Justin McKenna (Dungannon) |

| 14 September 2025 Round 1 Replay | Beragh | 5-14 – 1-10 | Drumquin | Killyclogher |
| 12:00PM | Conor Owens 0-8 (2x2pt), Jack Campbell 2-1, Niall Owens 1-1, Mattie McSorley 1-0, Sean McCann 1-0, Oisin Donnelly 0-3, Martin Rodgers 0-1. | Report | Oisin Gormely 0-5 (2x2pt), Sean McDonagh 1-2, Cormac Donnelly, Eoin Skelton and Ronan Strain 0-1 each. | Stadium: Ballinamullan; Referee: Martin Conroy (Moy) |

== Quarter-finals ==
| 19 September 2025 Quarter-final | Eglish | 1-19 – 2-10 | Owen Roes | Omagh |
| 8:30PM | Ethan Jordan 0-8 (1x2pt), Matthew Og McGleenan 0-4, Jack Muldoon 1-0, Luke Donnelly 0-3, Dan Muldoon 0-2, Conor McCann and Conall McNulty 0-1 each. | Report | Dara Dooher 1-4 (2x2pt), Aidan Hegarty 1-1, Cathal McShane 0-4, Niall McAleer 0-1. | Stadium: Healy Park; Referee: Stephen Campbell (Stewartstown) |

| 21 September 2025 Quarter-final | Beragh | 1-14 – 0-20 | Aghaloo | Donaghmore |
| 3:15PM | Conor Owens 1-2, Martin Rodgers 0-3 (1x2pt), Sean McCann 0-3 (1x2pt), Oisin Donnelly 0-2, Cathal Owens, Darragh McKenna, Paddy McCann and Finn Grimes 0-1 each. | Report | Niall McElroy 0-10 (2x2pt), Jody McGlone 0-3, Conor Mullen 0-2, James O'Hara, Ruairi McGlone, Miceal Muldoon, Stewart Douglas and Mark McCormick 0-1 each. | Stadium: St. Patrick's Park; Referee: Martin Coyle (Cookstown) |

| 21 September 2025 Quarter-final | Moy | 1-19 – 2-09 | Rock | Dungannon |
| 6:00PM | Michael Conroy 0-15 (5x2pt), Ryan Coleman 1-2, Matthew Laverty and Liam McGeary 0-1 each. | Report | Aidan McGarrity 1-3, Diarmuid Carroll 1-0, Caolan Chada 0-2, Thomas Mackle, Enda McWilliams, Odhran Nugent and Conor McGarrity 0-1 each. | Stadium: O'Neill Park; Referee: Kieran Eannetta (Omagh) |

| 21 September 2025 Quarter-final | Kildress | 0-12 – 1-19 | Clonoe | Dungannon |
| 7:30PM | Connor McAliskey 0-6 (1x2pt), Declan McClure 0-4, Tommy Taggart 0-4 (1x2pt), Danny McNulty 1-1, PJ Lavery 0-2, Darragh McGrath and Ryan McCabe 0-1 each. | Report | Shea Quinn 0-5 (1x2pt), Philip Lennon 0-2 (1x2pt), Corey Holland 0-2, Shea Loughran, Cormac Loughran and Pauric Lagan 0-1 each. | Stadium: O'Neill Park; Referee: Justin McKenna (Dungannon) |

== Semi-finals ==
| 05 October 2025 Semi-final | Clonoe | 1-18 – 0-09 | Aghaloo | Dungannon |
| 6:00PM | Connor McAliskey 0-7, Darragh McGrath 0-3,Tommy Taggart 0-3 (1x2pt), Rhys Donnelly 1-0, Declan McClure and Danny McNulty 0-2 each, Ryan Quinn 0-1. | Report | Jody McGlone 0-5 (2x2pt), Niall McElroy 0-3, Oliver Sherry 0-1. | Stadium: O'Neill Park; Referee: Michael Kelly (Urney) |

| 05 October 2025 Semi-final | Eglish | 2-19 – 1-14 | Moy | Dungannon |
| 7:30PM | Ethan Jordan 0-6 (2x2pt), Luke Donnelly 1-3, Dan Muldoon 0-4, Matthew Og McGleenan 1-0, Conor Holmes 0-3, Jack Muldoon, Nathan Horsfield and Conor McKenna 0-1 each. | Report | Michael Conroy 1-6 (2x2pt), Ryan Coleman 0-3, Liam McGeary 0-2, Declan Conroy, Patrick McGeary and Colm Cavanagh 0-1 each. | Stadium: O'Neill Park; Referee: Mark Loughran (Errigal Ciaran) |

== Final ==
| 19 October 2025 Final | Clonoe | 2-13 – 1-14 | Eglish | Dungannon |
| 5:00PM | Connor McAliskey 0-5, PJ Lavery and James Taggart 1-0 each, Declan McClure, Rhys Donnelly and Danny McNulty 0-2 each, Eoin Mansell and Ryan McCabe 0-1 each. | Report | Ethan Jordan 0-7 (2x2pt), Luke Donnelly 1-1, Conor Holmes 0-2, Dan Muldoon, Seamus Muldoon, Conor McKenna and Colm Byrne 0-1 each. | Stadium: O'Neill Park; Referee: Kieran Eannetta (Omagh) |
