= 2016 Tyrone Junior Football Championship =

The 2016 Tyrone Junior Football Championship was that year's annual Gaelic football tournament of Tyrone Junior Football Championship organized by Tyrone GAA. The winners of the event then represent Tyrone in the Ulster Junior Club Football Championship. Brackaville are the reigning champions following the 2015 Tyrone Junior Football Championship having beaten Aghaloo in the final on a scoreline of 0–9 to 0–8. However, as the winners of the Tyrone Junior Football Championship gain automatic promotion to the Tyrone Intermediate Football Championship for 2016 they cannot defend their title.

== Teams ==
The 2016 Tyrone Junior Football championship is contested by 17 clubs from across the county of Tyrone.

Team	Colours	Manager	Captain
Beragh Red Knights	Red and White
Brocagh Emmets	Orange and White
Castlederg St. Eugene's	Red and Black
Clann na nGael	Gold and Green
Clogher Eire Og	Maroon and White
Dregish Pearse Og	Maroon and Green
Drumquin Wolfe Tones	White and Red
Drumragh Sarsfields	White and Green
Errigal Ciaran III	White, Blue and Yellow
Fintona Pearses	Green and White
Glenelly St. Joseph's	Sky Blue and Navy
Killeeshil St. Mary's	Green and White
Killyman St. Mary's	Yellow and Blue
Newtownstewart St. Eugene's	Green and Yellow
Owen Roes O'Neills	Green and Red
Rock St. Patrick's	Green and Black
Tattyreagh St. Patrick's	Red and Black

== 2016 Tyrone Junior Football Championship ==
Preliminary round
Beragh	0-14 1-13(R)
Castlederg	1-11 1-15(R)

First round
Drumquin	0-11
Owen Roe O'Neill's	2-10
Drumragh	2-09
Newtownstewart	2-08
Rock	1-09
Castlederg	0-09
Killeeshil	0-05
Brocagh	3-13
Clann na nGael	3-11
Dregish	0-7
Clogher	2-15
Killyman	0-9
Tattyreagh	3-14
Fintona	1-5
Glenelly	0-13
Errigal Ciaran III	1-9

Quarter-Finals
Owen Roe O'Neill's	1-15
Drumragh	0-10
Rock	3-9
Brocagh	1-13
Clann na nGael	1-13 3-12 (R)
Clogher	2-10 2-07 (R)
Tattyreagh	2-11
Glenelly	1-09

Semi-Finals
Owen Roe O'Neill's	0-10
Rock	1-10
Clann na nGael	0-08
Tattyreagh	0-13

Final
Rock	1-10
Tattyreagh	1-07

== Fixtures ==
=== Preliminary round ===
14 August
6.30 PM
Preliminary round

Beragh	0-14 - 1-11	Castlederg

Newtownstewart

18 August
8.00 PM
Preliminary round replay

Beragh	1-13 - 1-15 (AET)	Castlederg

Garvaghey

=== First round ===
20 August
4.30 PM
First round

Clogher	2-15 - 0-9	Killyman

Eglish

20 August
6.00 PM
First round

Drumragh	2-9 - 2-8	Newtownstewart

Greencastle

20 August
6.00 PM
First round

Killeeshil	0-5 - 3-13	Brocagh

Eglish

21 August
5.30 PM
First round

Clann na nGael	3-11 - 0-7	Dregish

Newtownstewart

21 August
5.30 PM
First round

Glenelly	0-13 - 1-9	Errigal Ciaran III

Killyclogher

21 August
7.00 PM
First round

Drumquin	0-11 - 2-10	Owen Roe O'Neill's

Newtownstewart

21 August
7.00 PM
First round

Tattyreagh	3-14 - 1-5	Fintona

Killyclogher

24 August
8.00 PM
First round

Rock	1-9 - 0-9	Castlederg

Garvaghey

=== Quarter-finals ===
8 September
8.00 PM
Quarter-Final

Rock	3-09 - 1-13	Brocagh

Stewartstown

10 September
1.00 PM
Quarter-Final

Owen Roe O'Neill's	1-15 - 0-10	Drumragh

Carrickmore

10 September
2.30 PM
Quarter-Final

Clann na nGael	1-13 - 2-10	Clogher

Carrickmore

10 September
4.00 PM
Quarter-Final

Tattyreagh	2-11 - 1-09	Glenelly

Carrickmore

13 September
8.00 PM
Quarter-Final Replay

Clann na nGael	3-12 - 2-07	Clogher

Garvaghey

=== Semi-finals ===
17 September
7.00 PM
Semi-Final

Owen Roe O'Neill's	0-10 - 1-10	Rock

Healy Park, Omagh

19 September
8.00 PM
Semi-Final

Clann na nGael	0-08 - 0-13	Tattyreagh

Garvaghey

=== Final ===
2 October
2.00 PM
Final

Rock	1-10 - 1-7	Tattyreagh

Dungannon

=== Ulster Junior Club Championship ===
The winners now progress onto the Ulster Junior Club Championship as the representatives of Tyrone.

16 October
3.30 PM
Preliminary round

Rock (Tyrone)	0-8 - 1-1	Con Magee's (Antrim)

Dungannon

30 October
2.30 PM
Quarter Final

Cornafean (Cavan)	0-7 - 4-12	Rock (Tyrone)

Breffni Park, Cavan

13 November
2.30 PM
Semi Final

Newtownbutler First Fermanagh's (Fermanagh)	0-13 - 1-12	Rock (Tyrone)

St. Tiernach's Park, Clones

27 November
2.30 PM
Final

Blackhill Emeralds (Monaghan)	0-14 - 1-12 (AET)	Rock (Tyrone)

Pairc Esler, Newry

=== All-Ireland Junior Club Championship ===
The winners now progress onto the All-Ireland Junior Club Championship as the representatives of Ulster.

29 January
12.30 PM
Semi Final

Dunedin Connolly's (Scotland)	2-6 - 1-18	Rock (Tyrone)

Athletic Grounds, Armagh
19 February
2.00 PM
Final

Glenbeigh-Glencar (Kerry)	1-14 - 1-11	Rock (Tyrone)

Páirc an Chrócaigh, Dublin
