= 2026 Tyrone Intermediate Football Championship =

Gaelic football tournament in Ireland

2026 Connollys of Moy Tyrone Intermediate Football Championship
Tournament details
- County: Tyrone
- Province: Ulster
- Level: Intermediate
- Year: 2026
- Trophy: Paddy Cullen Cup
- Sponsor: Connollys Of Moy
- Date: 27 August – 17 October 2026
- Teams: 16

Winners
- Champions: Rock St. Patrick's
- Captain: Aidan McGarrity
- Qualify for: Ulster Club IFC

The 2026 Tyrone Intermediate Football Championship is the 65th edition of Tyrone GAA's second tier Gaelic football tournament for Intermediate clubs in County Tyrone, Ireland.

The championship consists of 16 teams in a straight knock-out format.

The draw for the 2026 championship took place at Connollys of Moy on Thursday 14th May 2026.

There will be a new draw made after each round to determine pairings for the subsequent round.

== Team changes ==
The following teams have changed division since the 2025 championship season.

Promoted from 2025 Intermediate Division

- Clonoe O'Rahilly's (Intermediate Championship & Division 2 League Winners)
- Eglish St. Patrick's (All-County League Division 2 Runner-up)
- Coalisland Fianna (All-County League Division 1/2 Playoff Winner)

Relegated to 2026 Intermediate Division

- Pomeroy Plunketts (All-County League Division 1/2 Playoff Loser)
- Gortin St. Patrick's (All-County League Division 1 Playoff Loser)
- Derrylaughan Kevin Barry's (16th in All-County League Division 1)

Promoted from 2025 Junior Division

- Clogher Eire Óg (Junior Championship Winners)
- Cookstown Fr. Rock's (All-County League Division 3 Winners)

Relegated to 2026 Junior Division

- Fintona Pearses (All-County League Division 2 Playoff Loser)
- Stewartstown Harps (16th in All-County League Division 2)

== Bracket ==
Round 1
Gortin	1-14
Naomh Eoghan	2-13
Aghyaran	0-18 (1-16)
Moy	0-18 (1-15)
Greencastle	1-15
Beragh	2-11
Rock	2-17
Kildress	2-09
Clogher	1-15
Pomeroy	2-21
Killeeshil	5-10
Derrylaughan	3-20
Owen Roes	1-24
Aghaloo	2-10
Cookstown	2-17
Drumquin	2-08

Quarter-finals
Naomh Eoghan	1-20
Aghyaran	1-12
Greencastle	0-11
Rock	1-18
Pomeroy	1-21
Derrylaughan	0-14
Owen Roes	1-15
Cookstown	3-15

Semi-finals
Naomh Eoghan	1-19
Rock	4-19
Pomeroy	2-15
Cookstown	1-15

Final
Rock	0-11 (0-23)
Pomeroy	0-11 (1-13)

Notes
The bracket may change depending on the draw made after each round.

== First Round ==
27 August 2026 Round 1	Killeeshil	5-10 – 3-20	Derrylaughan	Stewartstown
7:30PM		Report		Stadium: Mullaghmoyle Park; Referee: Gary Gormley (Drumquin)

28 August 2026 Round 1	Aghyaran	0-18 – 0-18	Moy	Omagh
6:45PM		Report		Stadium: Healy Park; Referee: Michael Kelly (Urney)

28 August 2026 Round 1	Cookstown	2-17 – 2-08	Drumquin	Omagh
8:15PM		Report		Stadium: Healy Park; Referee: Shane Meehan (Glenelly)

29 August 2026 Round 1	Greencastle	1-15 – 2-11	Beragh	Loughmacrory
4:00PM		Report		Stadium: Páirc an Locha; Referee: Andrew McKenna (Eskra)

2 September 2026 Round 1	Rock	2-17 – 2-09	Kildress	Cookstown
7:00PM		Report		Stadium: Paddy Cullen Park; Referee: Justin McKenna (Dungannon)

30 August 2026 Round 1	Clogher	1-15 – 2-21	Pomeroy	Eglish
1:30PM		Report		Stadium: Fr. Connolly Park; Referee: Niall Conlan (Moortown)

30 August 2026 Round 1	Owen Roes	1-24 – 2-10	Aghaloo	Killyclogher
4:30PM		Report		Stadium: Ballinamullan; Referee: Sean Devenney (Drumquin)

30 August 2026 Round 1	Gortin	1-14 – 2-13	Naomh Eoghan	Killyclogher
6:00PM		Report		Stadium: Ballinamullan; Referee: Cahal Bell (Killeeshil)

6 September 2026 Round 1 Replay	Aghyaran	1-16 – 1-15	Moy	Omagh
5:00PM	Benny Gallen 0-6, Eoghan McHugh 0-5, Ethan McHugh 1-0, Ronan McHugh 0-2, Diarmuid Byrne 0-1, Brian Penrose 0-1.	Report	Michael Conroy 0-6, Ryan Coleman 0-5, Ryan McAlary 1-1, Declan Conroy 0-1, Patrick Lavery 0-1.	Stadium: Healy Park; Referee: Mark O'Neill (Cookstown)

== Quarter-finals ==
11 September 2026 Quarter-final	Owen Roes	1-15 – 3-15	Cookstown	Omagh
8:15PM		Report		Stadium: Healy Park; Referee: Cahal Bell (Killeeshil)

12 September 2026 Quarter-final	Greencastle	0-11 – 1-18	Rock	Loughmacrory
4:45PM		Report		Stadium: Páirc an Locha; Referee: Niall Conlan (Moortown)

13 September 2026 Quarter-final	Naomh Eoghan	1-20 – 1-12	Aghyaran	Carrickmore
2:45PM		Report		Stadium: Páirc Colmcille; Referee: Mark Nugent (Donaghmore)

13 September 2026 Quarter-final	Pomeroy	1-21 – 0-14	Derrylaughan	Dungannon
7:15PM		Report		Stadium: O'Neill Park; Referee: Gary Gormley (Drumquin)

== Semi-finals ==
25 September 2026 Semi-final	Naomh Eoghan	1-19 – 4-19	Rock	Omagh
7:30PM		Report		Stadium: Healy Park; Referee: Justin McKenna (Dungannon)

27 September 2026 Semi-final	Cookstown	1-15 – 2-15	Pomeroy	Dungannon
6:00PM		Report		Stadium: O'Neill Park

== Final ==
11 October 2026 Final	Rock	0-11 – 0-11	Pomeroy	Dungannon
6:30PM		Report		Stadium: O'Neill Park; Referee: Cahal Bell (Killeeshil)

== Final Replay ==
17 October 2026 Final	Rock	0-23 – 1-13	Pomeroy	Dungannon
5:00PM		Report		Stadium: O'Neill Park; Referee: Shane Meehan (Glenelly)
