= 2025 Tyrone Junior Football Championship =

2025 Connollys of Moy Tyrone Junior Football Championship
Tournament details
- County: Tyrone
- Province: Ulster
- Level: Junior
- Year: 2025
- Trophy: Pat Darcy Cup
- Sponsor: Connollys Of Moy
- Date: 23 August – 18 October 2025
- Teams: 18

Winners
- Champions: Clogher Éire Óg
- Captain: Conor Shields
- Qualify for: Ulster Club JFC

Runners-up
- Runners-up: Drumragh

The 2025 Tyrone Junior Football Championship is the 98th edition of Tyrone GAA's third tier Gaelic football tournament for Junior clubs in County Tyrone, Ireland.

The championship consists of 18 teams in a straight knock-out format.

The draw for the 2025 championship took place on Wednesday 25th June 2025.

There was a new draw after each round to determine pairings for the subsequent round.

The draw for the Quarter-Finals took place at Páirc an Locha, Loughmacrory on Sunday 7th September 2025.

The draw for the Semi-Finals took place at O'Neill Park, Dungannon on Sunday 21st September 2025.

The Semi-Finals were originally scheduled to be played on Saturday 4th October but were refixed for Monday 6th and Tuesday 7th October due to Storm Amy.

== Team changes ==
The following teams have changed division since the 2024 championship season.

Promoted from 2024 Junior Division

- Killeeshil St Mary's (Junior Championship Winners)
- Drumquin Wolfe Tones (All-County League Division 3 Winners)
- Aghaloo O'Neill's (All-County League Division 2/3 Playoff Winner)

Relegated to 2025 Junior Division

- Cookstown Fr. Rock's (All-County League Division 2/3 Playoff Loser)
- Clogher Eire Óg (All-County League Division 2 Playoff Loser)
- Drumragh Sarsfields (16th in All-County League Division 2)

== Bracket ==
Prel. Round
Derrytresk	4-14
Donaghmore III	1-09
Tattyreagh	3-12
Brackaville	2-16

Round 1
Errigal Ciarán III	0-16 (0-16)
Derrytresk	1-13 (3-06)
Drumragh	2-14
Glenelly	1-10
Cookstown	3-24
Killyman	0-03
Augher	3-09
Eskra	0-13
Omagh III	0-06
Clogher	9-19
Clann Na nGael	2-17
Urney	2-09
Brackaville	2-16
Brocagh	0-19
Castlederg	1-09
Strabane	2-17

Quarter-finals
Errigal Ciarán III	2-07
Drumragh	0-19
Cookstown	3-18
Augher	2-11
Clogher	2-15
Clann Na nGael	0-8
Brackaville	3-10
Strabane	3-15

Semi-finals
Drumragh	2-14 (2-18)
Cookstown	1-17 (2-17)
Clogher	3-17
Strabane	4-04

Final
Drumragh	0-12
Clogher	1-21

Notes
The above bracket may change depending on the new draw made after each round.

Match Programmes for the 2025 Championship can be viewed here: https://tyronegaa.ie/club-championship-2025/programmes/

== Preliminary Round ==
23 August 2025 Preliminary Round	Derrytresk	4-14 – 1-09	Donaghmore III	Augher
4:15PM	Pat Campbell 2-1, Eoin McNally 1-2, Liam Slater 1-1, Cathal O'Neill 0-3, Ultan McKee 0-2, Conor Fitzgerald 0-2, Ciaran McKee 0-2, Odhran Hughes 0-1.	Report	Dermot McAleer 1-4, Sean McCaul 0-2, Conall Heron 0-1, Caolan Quinn 0-1, Aodhan Molly 0-1.	Stadium: Father Hackett Park; Referee: Stephen McBride (Drumquin)

23 August 2025 Preliminary Round	Tattyreagh	3-12 – 2-16	Brackaville	Augher
6:00PM	Gareth Mimnagh 1-3, Keelan McDonagh 1-3, Peadar Mullan 1-2, Ronan Collins 0-1, Joe Cartin 0-1, Callum Leonard 0-1, Aidan Martin 0-1.	Report	Jason O'Neill 0-9 (3x2pt), Ronan McHugh 0-5 (1x2pt), Conor Stock 1-1, Daire Fee 1-0, Cailum Coyle 0-1.	Stadium: Father Hackett Park; Referee: Ciagan Patton (Naomh Eoghan)

== First Round ==
29 August 2025 Round 1	Omagh III	0-06 – 9-19	Clogher	Fintona
6:45PM	Ben McFarland 0-2 (1x2pt), Ryan McGarvey 0-2 (1x2pt), Senan Doyle 0-1, Eamon McMahon 0-1.	Report	Marc McConnell 3-2, Sean Bogue 1-5, Ciaran Bogue 1-4, Conor Shields 1-2, Ryan McCaughey 0-3, Barry McKenna 1-0, Finbar McCaughey 1-0, Mattie Callaghan 1-0, Eoin McCarron 0-1, Gareth McKenna 0-1.	Stadium: St Lawrence's Park; Referee: Joseph Franey (Beragh)

30 August 2025 Round 1	Cookstown	3-24 – 0-03	Killyman	Errigal Ciaran
4:15PM	Karol Wawrynkiewicz 0-8 (1x2pt), Luke Neeson 2-2, Matthew Carberry 0-5 (1x2pt), Charlie McElkearney 1-1, Conall Sheehy 0-2, Eoghan Donnelly, Seamus Glackin, Darragh McHugh, Niall McMurray 0-1 each.	Report	Caomhan McGahan 0-2 (1x2pt), Shea Gates 0-1.	Stadium: Dunmoyle; Referee: Odhran Gallen (Castlederg)

30 August 2025 Round 1	Augher	3-09 – 0-13	Eskra	Errigal Ciaran
6:00PM	Darragh Kavanagh 1-4 (1x2pt), Declan Connolly 1-0, Tiernan McElroy 1-0, Dara Donnelly 0-2, Martin McElhatton 0-2, Raymond McElroy 0-1.	Report	Rory Kinsella 0-4, Cormac Hughes 0-4, Conor O’Hagan 0-3 (1x2pt), Finn Kelly 0-1, Luke Kelly 0-1.	Stadium: Dunmoyle; Referee: Stephen Patton (Strabane)

6 September 2025 Round 1	Brackaville	2-16 – 0-19	Brocagh	Derrylaughan
1:00PM	Dale McSorley 1-6 (1x2pt), Shea Fee 0-4, Daire Fee 1-0, Tiernan McGlinchey 0-3, Conor Stock, Ronan McHugh and Tiernan Ruddy 0-1 each.	Report	Mickey Hughes 0-15 (5x2pt), Barry Donnelly, James McKiver, Cathal Donnelly and Michael Robinson 0-1 each.	Stadium: Páirc Doire Locháin; Referee: Stephen McBride (Drumquin)

6 September 2025 Round 1	Clann Na nGael	2-17 – 2-09	Urney	Greencastle
1:00PM	David Conway 2-4 (1x2pt), Robbie Conway 0-5, Ciaran Kerlin 0-3, Gareth McDermott 0-2, Shea Brown 0-2 (1x2pt), Keenan Donaghey 0-1.	Report	Ryan Henry 1-4, Conor McDaid 1-3, Adrian Maxwell, Sean Hughes 0-1 each.	Stadium: Greencastle; Referee: Gary Gormley (Drumquin)

6 September 2025 Round 1	Castlederg	1-09 – 2-17	Strabane	Greencastle
3:00PM	Corin McConnell 0-7 (2x2pt), Cian Harper 1-0, Darren Traynor, Adam Traynor 0-1 each.	Report	Oran McGrath 1-7 (2x2pt), Haydn McNamee 0-7 (1x2pt), Kelvin Nelson 1-0, Oran White 0-2 (1x2pt), Oisin McGillion 0-1.	Stadium: Greencastle; Referee: Mark Nugent (Donaghmore)

6 September 2025 Round 1	Errigal Ciarán III	0-16 – 1-13	Derrytresk	Stewartstown
4:30PM	Aaron Neill 0-4 (2x2pt), Robert Harper 0-4 (2x2pt), Davy Harte 0-3 (1x2pt), Ryan Lynch 0-2, Niall McCartan 0-2, Ryan Ward 0-1.	Report	Niall Gavin 0-8, James Canavan 1-0, Caolan O’Donnell 0-2, Odhran Hughes 0-1, Pat Campbell 0-1, Liam Slater 0-1.	Stadium: Mullaghmoyle Park; Referee: Gareth McArdle (Donaghmore)

7 September 2025 Round 1	Drumragh	2-14 – 1-10	Glenelly	Loughmacrory
4:15PM	Niall McCarney 1-6 (2x2pt), Daniel O’Neill 1-3, Kian Murphy 0-2, Eoin Montgomery 0-1, Sean McGale 0-1, Ronan Maguire 0-1.	Report	Brendan Quinn 1-0, Rory Kennedy 0-3 (1x2pt), Cormac McBride 0-2 (1x2pt), Eamonn McConnell 0-2, Ronan O’Kane 0-2, Cathal O’Neill 0-1.	Stadium: Páirc an Locha; Referee: Martin Coyle (Cookstown)

13 September 2025 Round 1 Replay	Errigal Ciarán III	0-16 – 3-06	Derrytresk	Carrickmore
3:30PM	Senan Canavan 0-4 (1x2pt), Davy Harte 0-3 (1x2pt), Niall McCartan 0-3, Aaron Neill 0-2 (1x2pt), Robert Harper 0-2, Ethan Neill and Colm Mellon 0-1 each.	Report	Liam Slater 1-2, Caolan Corr 1-1, Ultan McKee 1-0, Niall Gavin 0-2, Odhran Hughes 0-1.	Stadium: Páirc Colmcille; Referee: Mark Nugent (Donaghmore)

== Quarter-finals ==
19 September 2025 Quarter-final	Cookstown	3-18 – 2-11	Augher	Omagh
7:00PM	Michael McElhatton 0-9, Conall Sheehy 1-2, Nathan Connolly 1-1, Matthew McNeill 1-0, Matthew Carberry 0-2, Niall McMurray, Karol McGuigan and Karol Wawrynkiewicz 0-1 each.	Report	Darragh Kavanagh 0-7 (3x2pt), Declan Connolly 1-1, Jarlath McNamee 1-0, Ronan McElroy, Finnbar McElroy and Tiernan McElroy 0-1 each.	Stadium: Healy Park; Referee: Mark Nugent (Donaghmore)

20 September 2025 Quarter-final	Brackaville	3-10 – 3-15	Strabane	Killyclogher
3:30PM	Daire Fee 2-0, Dale McSorley 0-3, Daire Carberry 1-0, Shea Fee 0-2, Ronan McHugh 0-2, Enda O’Neill, Jason O’Neill and Tiernan McGlinchey 0-1 each.	Report	Conal Crawford 1-5, Oran McGrath 0-7 (1x2pt), Gary Quigg 1-0, Oisin McGillion 1-0, Haydn McNamee 0-2, Oran White 0-1.	Stadium: Ballinamullan; Referee: Cathal Mc Crory (Greencastle)

20 September 2025 Quarter-final	Clogher	2-15 – 0-8	Clann Na nGael	Killyclogher
5:00PM	Ciaran Bogue 1-5, Marc McConnell 1-1, Ryan McCaughey 0-3, Rory McElroy 0-2, Mattie Callaghan, Conor Shields, Michael McCaughey and Cillian Barkey 0-1 each.	Report	Robbie Conway 0-4, Ciaran Kerlin, David Conway, Gareth McDermott and Keenan Donaghey 0-1 each.	Stadium: Ballinamullan; Referee: Ciagan Patton (Naomh Eoghan)

21 September 2025 Quarter-final	Errigal Ciarán III	2-07 – 0-19	Drumragh	Donaghmore
1:30PM	Ryan Lynch 1-1, Damien McDermott 1-0, Niall McCartan 0-2 (1x2pt), David Harte 0-2 (1x2pt), Robert Harper and Senan Canavan 0-1 each.	Report	Niall McCarney 0-8 (3x2pt), Daniel O’Neill 0-5 (1x2pt), Kian Murphy 0-2, Malachy McManus, Sean McGale, Ronan Maguire and Eoin Montgomery 0-1 each.	Stadium: St. Patrick's Park; Referee: Stephen Patton (Strabane)

== Semi-finals ==
06 October 2025 Semi-final	Clogher	3-17 – 4-04	Strabane	Garvaghey
7:15PM	Ciaran Bogue 1-10 (1x2pt), Conor Shields 1-2, Marc McConnell 1-1, Ryan McCaughey 0-3, Michael McCaughey 0-1.		Oran McGrath 1-2, Oran White 1-0, Kyle Morrison 1-0, Kelvin Nelson 1-0, Haydn McNamee 0-2.	Stadium: Garvaghey Centre; Referee: Niall Conlan (Moortown)

07 October 2025 Semi-final	Drumragh	2-14 – 1-17	Cookstown	Stewartstown
7:30PM	Kian Murphy 1-2, Niall McCarney 0-4 (1x2pt), Ronan Maguire 1-1, Daniel O'Neill 0-3, Sean McGale 0-2, Michael Roche and Carraig McKenna 0-1 each.		Michael McElhatton 0-6, Karol Wawrynkiewicz 1-3 (1x2pt), Niall McMurray 0-2, Matthew Carberry, Eoghan Donnelly, Nathan Connolly, Luke Neeson, Karol McGuigan and Conall Sheehy 0-1 each.	Stadium: Mullaghmoyle Park; Referee: Cahal Bell (Killeeshil)

11 October 2025 Semi-final Replay	Drumragh	2-18 – 2-17; AET	Cookstown	Killyclogher
2:00PM	Niall McCarney 0-10 (3x2pt), Daniel O'Neill 1-0, Eamonn McCann 1-0, Kian Murphy 0-3, Eoin Montgomery 0-2, Michael Roche, Alex McGlinchey and Ben Monk 0-1 each.	Report	Karol Wawrynkiewicz 1-7 (2x2pt), Matthew McNeill 1-1, Nathan Connolly 0-2, Michael McElhatton 0-2, Niall McMurray, Darragh McHugh, Conall Sheehy, Karol McGuigan and Matthew Carberry 0-1 each.	Stadium: Ballinamullan; Referee: Stephen Campbell (Stewartstown)

== Final ==
18 October 2025 Final	Drumragh	0-12 – 1-21	Clogher	Omagh
5:30PM	Niall McCarney 0-6 (1x2pt), Ben Monk and Kian Murphy 0-2 each, Aaron Montgomery and Eoin Montgomery 0-1 each.	Report	Ciaran Bogue 0-7 (2x2pt), Marc McConnell 1-3, Conor Shields 0-3 (1x2pt), Barry McKenna 0-3 (1x2pt), Ryan McCaughey 0-2, Michael McCaughey, Vincent Lowry and Cillian Barkey 0-1 each.	Stadium: Healy Park; Referee: Paul Gallagher (Castlederg)
