= 2017 Tyrone Intermediate Football Championship =

Tyrone Intermediate Football Championship
- Season: 2017
- Relegated: ??? (16th in S.F.L.) ??? (S.F.L. Relegation Playoff Loser)
- Ulster SCFC: ???

The 2017 Tyrone Intermediate Football Championship is the 2017 edition of Tyrone GAA's second-tier gaelic football tournament for intermediate clubs in County Tyrone, Northern Ireland. Sixteen teams compete with the winners receiving promotion to the Tyrone Senior Football Championship the next year and representing Tyrone in the Ulster Intermediate Club Football Championship.

Pomeroy Plunkett's won the 2016 IFC final after they defeated Derrylaughan 3-12 to 1-12 in the final in Omagh.

Pomeroy Plunkett's, Urney St. Columba's and Donaghmore St. Patrick's returned to senior championship football in 2017.

Rock St. Patrick's won the 2016 Tyrone JFC final defeating Tattyreagh 1-9 to 1-6 in Dungannon to earn promotion to the 2017 Tyrone Intermediate Championship.

== Championship Draw ==
First round
Moy
Augher
Cookstown
Moortown
Rock
Aghyaran
Eskra
Aghaloo
Dungannon
Gortin
Kildress
Loughmacrory
Stewartstown
Eglish
Derrylaughan
Castlederg

Quarter-Finals

Semi-Finals

Final

== First round ==
| 8 September 2017; 7:00 pm First round | Aghyaran | 2-13 - 0-8 | Rock | Healy Park; Referee: Martin McErlane (Clonoe); Man of the Match: Ronan McHugh |
| 8 September 2017; 7:00 pm First round | Ronan McHugh 2-8 (0-5f), Ronan McNamee, Eoin Byrne, Paddy McNulty, Roger Leonard, Sean Byrne 0-1 each | | Aidan McGarrity 0-4 (0-2f), Diarmaid Carroll, Liam Nugent, Francis Bloomer, Mark Ward 0-1 each | Healy Park; Referee: Martin McErlane (Clonoe); Man of the Match: Ronan McHugh |

| 9 September 2017; 12:30 pm First round | Cookstown | 1-6 - 1-5 | Moortown | Edendork; Referee: Michael McCann (Beragh); Man of the Match: John Gilmore |
| 9 September 2017; 12:30 pm First round | John Gilmore 0-4 (0-3f), Oisin McNia 1-0, Martin Murray and Matthew Carberry 0-1 each | | Ryan Kelly 1-1, Conor Heron (0-1f), Karl Hagan 0-1, Tony Quinn (0-1f) 0-1 each | Edendork; Referee: Michael McCann (Beragh); Man of the Match: John Gilmore |

| 9 September 2017; 4:00 pm First round | Eskra | 2-14 - 1-11 | Aghaloo | Errigal Ciaran; Referee: Mickey McCarron (Fintona); Man of the Match: Niall McGinn (Eskra) |
| 9 September 2017; 4:00 pm First round | Jonathan Hackett and Aaron Kelly 1-1 each, Peter Hughes (0-3f) and Joseph McCarroll (0-4f) 0-4 each, Conor O'Hagan 0-3 | | Stephen Donnelly 1-1 (0-1f), Niall McElroy 0-3 (0-1f), Jody McGlone 0-2, Ruairi McGlone and Tiernan Donnelly (0-1f) 0-1 each | Errigal Ciaran; Referee: Mickey McCarron (Fintona); Man of the Match: Niall McGinn (Eskra) |

| 10 September 2017; 4:30 pm First round | Moy | 1-10 - 1-8 | Augher | Carrickmore; Referee: Michael Connolly (Aghyaran); Man of the Match: Harry Loughran |
| 10 September 2017; 4:30 pm First round | Sean Cavanagh 0-6 (0-4f), Declan Conroy 1-1, Adam Currie, Harry Loughran, Eunan Deeney (0-1f) 0-1 each | | Darragh Kavanagh 1-1 (1-0 pen, 0-1f), Declan Connolly 0-3f, Eoghan Keenan, Darragh Donnelly, Liam Connolly, Aidan Cassidy 0-1 each | Carrickmore; Referee: Michael Connolly (Aghyaran); Man of the Match: Harry Loughran |

| 13 September 2017; 7:45 pm First round | Derrylaughan | 0-14 - 0-4 | Castlederg | Healy Park; Referee: Fergal Ward (Errigal Ciaran); Man of the Match: Brian Kennedy (Castlederg) |
| 13 September 2017; 7:45 pm First round | Ciaran Gervin 0-4, Fergal McAliskey 0-3 (0-2f), Seamus McCann and Tomas Carney (0-1f) 0-2 each, Patrick Quinn, Liam Gervin, Ciaran Quinn 0-1 each | av av | Patrick Lynch 0-3 (0-2f) and Conor McCallion 0-1 | Healy Park; Referee: Fergal Ward (Errigal Ciaran); Man of the Match: Brian Kennedy (Castlederg) |

| 15 September 2017; 7:00 pm First round | Kildress | 3-8 - 1-9 | Loughmacrory | Healy Park; Referee: Cathal Forbes (Ardboe); Man of the Match: Martin Grimes |

| 16 September 2017; 12:00 pm First round | Eglish | 2-12 - 0-16 | Stewartstown | Pomeroy; Referee: Kieran Eannetta (Omagh); Man of the Match: Dan Lowe |

| 16 September 2017; 2:45 pm First round | Dungannon | 0-5 - 1-5 | Gortin | Loughmacrory; Referee: Mark O'Neill (Cookstown); Man of the Match: Fiachra McNulty |

== Quarter-finals ==
| 22 September 2017; 7:00 pm Quarter-Final | Aghyaran | 1-14 - 2-6 | Eskra | Omagh; Man of the Match: Ronan McHugh |

| 23 September 2017; 2:00 pm Quarter-Final | Derrylaughan | 2-13 - 0-8 | Eglish | Galbally; Referee: Brian McCallion (Castlederg); Man of the Match: Brian Kennedy |

| 23 September 2017; 3:00 pm Quarter-Final | Gortin | 0-11 - 0-9 | Kildress | Loughmacrory; Referee: Sean Hurson (Galbally); Man of the Match: Ruairi Keenan |

| 23 September 2017; 4:00 pm Quarter-Final | Moy | 1-13 - 2-7 | Cookstown | Edendork; Referee: Stephen Campbell (Stewartstown) |

== Semi-finals ==
30 September 2017
3:15 pm
Semi-Final

| Derrylaughan | 3-12 - 2-10 | Aghyaran |
|---|---|---|
| | av |

Pomeroy
1 October 2017
3:15 pm
Semi-Final

| Moy | 3-9 - 0-5 | Gortin |
|---|---|---|
| | av |

Carrickmore

== Final ==
8 October 2017
4:15 pm
Final

| Moy | -vs- | Derrylaughan |

Carrickmore
