= 2026 Tyrone Junior Football Championship =

Junior gaelic football tournament

2026 Connollys of Moy Tyrone Junior Football Championship
Tournament details
- County: Tyrone
- Province: Ulster
- Level: Junior
- Year: 2026
- Trophy: Pat Darcy Cup
- Sponsor: Connollys Of Moy
- Date: 15 August – 10 October 2026
- Teams: 19

Winners
- Champions: Fintona Pearses
- Captain: Peter McGlinn
- Qualify for: Ulster Club JFC

Runners-up
- Runners-up: Stewartstown Harps

The 2026 Tyrone Junior Football Championship is the 99th edition of Tyrone GAA's third tier Gaelic football tournament for Junior clubs in County Tyrone, Ireland.

The championship consists of 19 teams in a straight knock-out format.

The draw for the 2026 championship took place at Connollys of Moy on Thursday 14th May 2026.

There will be a new draw made after each round to determine pairings for the subsequent round.

== Team changes ==
The following teams have changed division since the 2025 championship season.

Promoted from 2025 Junior Division

- Clogher Eire Óg (Junior Championship Winners)
- Cookstown Fr. Rock's (All-County League Division 3 Winners)

Relegated to 2026 Junior Division

- Fintona Pearses (All-County League Division 2 Playoff Loser)
- Stewartstown Harps (16th in All-County League Division 2)

Notes
There was no Inter-divisional Playoff in 2025 between Division 2 and 3.

== Bracket ==
Preliminary Round
Stewartstown	1-16
Strabane	3-06
Fintona	2-22
Urney	1-14
Eskra	2-19
Augher	0-15

Round 1
Derrytresk	0-15
Killyman	0-13
Glenelly	4-15 (0-13)
Castlederg	5-12 (1-12)
Errigal Ciarán III	1-15
Cookstown III	0-06
Stewartstown	10-24
Omagh III	1-08
Brackaville	2-16
Tattyreagh	5-18
Clann Na nGael	1-08
Brocagh	4-17
Fintona	1-24
Eskra	0-13
Donaghmore III	1-07
Drumragh	6-28

Quarter-finals
Derrytresk	2-07
Castlederg	2-09
Errigal Ciarán III	1-09
Stewartstown	4-21
Tattyreagh	1-21
Brocagh	1-13
Fintona	2-19
Drumragh	0-10

Semi-finals
Castlederg	1-10
Stewartstown	1-15
Tattyreagh	0-10
Fintona	0-19

Final
Stewartstown	2-14
Fintona	2-16

Notes
The bracket may change depending on the draw made after each round.

== Preliminary Round ==
15 August 2026 Preliminary Round	Fintona	2-22 – 1-14	Urney	Killyclogher
1:30PM		Report		Stadium: Ballinamullan; Referee: Ciagan Patton (Naomh Eoghan)

15 August 2026 Preliminary Round	Stewartstown	1-16 – 3-06	Strabane	Killyclogher
3:00PM		Report		Stadium: Ballinamullan; Referee: Andrew McKenna (Eskra)

15 August 2026 Preliminary Round	Eskra	2-19 – 0-15	Augher	Clogher
5:30PM		Report		Stadium: St. Patrick's Park; Referee: Mark Nugent (Donaghmore)

== First Round ==
21 August 2026 Round 1	Errigal Ciarán III	1-15 – 0-06	Cookstown III	Stewartstown
6:30PM				Stadium: Mullaghmoyle Park; Referee: Justin McKenna (Dungannon)

21 August 2026 Round 1	Derrytresk	0-15 – 0-13	Killyman	Stewartstown
8:00PM		Report		Stadium: Mullaghmoyle Park; Referee: Odhran Gallen (Castlederg)

22 August 2026 Round 1	Stewartstown	10-24 – 1-08	Omagh III	Killeeshil
1:30PM		Report		Stadium: St. Mary's Park; Referee: Ciagan Patton (Naomh Eoghan)

22 August 2026 Round 1	Donaghmore III	1-07 – 6-28	Drumragh	Killeeshil
3:00PM		Report		Stadium: St. Mary's Park; Referee: Joseph Franey (Beragh)

22 August 2026 Round 1	Brackaville	2-16 – 5-18	Tattyreagh	Errigal Ciaran
5:00PM		Report		Stadium: Dunmoyle; Referee: Andrew McKenna (Eskra)

22 August 2026 Round 1	Eskra	0-13 – 1-24	Fintona	Errigal Ciaran
6:30PM		Report		Stadium: Dunmoyle; Referee: Niall Conlan (Moortown)

23 August 2026 Round 1	Clann Na nGael	1-08 – 4-17	Brocagh	Greencastle
1:30PM		Report		Stadium: Greencastle; Referee: Mark Nugent (Donaghmore)

23 August 2026 Round 1	Glenelly	4-15 – 5-12	Castlederg	Greencastle
3:00PM		Report		Stadium: Greencastle; Referee: Marty Coyle (Cookstown)

29 August 2026 Round 1 Replay	Glenelly	0-13 – 1-12	Castlederg	Loughmacrory
3:45PM		Report		Stadium: Páirc an Locha; Referee: Stephen Campbell (Stewartstown)

== Quarter-finals ==
11 September 2026 Quarter-final	Fintona	2-19 – 0-10	Drumragh	Omagh
6:30PM		Report		Stadium: Healy Park; Referee: Andrew McKenna (Eskra)

12 September 2026 Quarter-final	Errigal Ciarán III	1-09 – 4-21	Stewartstown	Loughmacrory
3:00PM		Report		Stadium: Páirc an Locha; Referee: Stephen Patton (Strabane)

13 September 2026 Quarter-final	Castlederg	2-09 – 2-07	Derrytresk	Carrickmore
1:00PM		Report		Stadium: Páirc Colmcille; Referee: Martin McErlain (Clonoe)

13 September 2026 Quarter-final	Brocagh	1-21 – 1-13	Tattyreagh	Dungannon
5:30PM		Report		Stadium: O'Neill Park; Referee: Odhran Gallen (Castlederg)

== Semi-finals ==
26 September 2026 Semi-final	Tattyreagh	0-10 – 0-19	Fintona	Carrickmore
4:30PM		Report		Stadium: Páirc Colmcille; Referee: Sean Devenney (Drumquin)

27 September 2026 Semi-final	Castlederg	1-10 – 1-15	Stewartstown	Killyclogher
2:00PM				Stadium: Ballinamullan; Referee: Marty Coyle (Cookstown)

== Final ==
10 October 2026 Final	Fintona	2-16 – 2-14	Stewartstown	Omagh
7:00PM		Report		Stadium: Healy Park; Referee: Niall Conlan (Moortown)
