= Fintona (disambiguation) =

Fintona is a village located in County Tyrone, Northern Ireland.

Fintona may also refer to:

- Fintona Girls' School, a school located in Balwyn, Victoria, Australia
- Fintona Pearses, a Gaelic Athletic Association club
