= Galbally Pearses GAC =

Tyrone-based Gaelic games club

Galbally Pearses'
- Piarsaigh An Ghallbhaile
- Founded: 1949
- County: Tyrone
- Nickname: The Pearses'
- Colours: Blue & white
- Grounds: Pearse Park
- Coordinates: 54°32′34″N 6°54′16″W

Playing kits
Standard	Reserve

Senior Club Championships
	All Ireland	Ulster champions	Tyrone champions
Football:	0	0	0

Galbally Pearses' is a Gaelic Athletic Association club based in the village of Galbally in County Tyrone, Northern Ireland. The club is named after the 1916 Easter Rising martyr, Patrick Pearse.

== History ==
The "Irish Rapperees" of Galbally were affiliated with the Gaelic Athletic Association for the first time on 30 April 1905. The club was named after Shane Bernagh, who was a highwayman and rapparee who was active in the local area in the 17th century. This club did not survive for long, and by 1907 the Irish Rapperees were no longer in existence. Approximately ten years later, The Galbally McDermott's were established. However, this club was also short-lived. Galbally St Joseph's were affiliated in February 1931 and lasted until 1943. During their short existence, the St Joseph's appeared in three East Tyrone Junior Championship Finals, losing-out to Moortown in 1934, Pomeroy in 1935 and Washinbay in 1942.

The present Galbally Pearses' club was affiliated in August 1949, with the now defunct East Tyrone Board. In 1954, the Pearses' collected their first silverware winning the East Tyrone Junior League. Further success continued with the minors winning the Clarke cup in the mid fifties and the seniors winning the Tyrone Junior Championship in 1958, beating Creggan in the Final.

In 1961, the current grounds officially were opened. In 1962, the Pearses' club won the Feis Shield and, after having an unbeaten run in the Intermediate league, were promoted to the Senior ranks of Tyrone Gaelic football. In 1963, Galbally won a place in their first ever Tyrone Senior Football Championship final against Omagh St Enda's on 1 September 1963. The Pearse's were defeated by 2 goals and 10 points for Omagh, 5 points for Galbally.

In 1977, the Pearses won the Division 5B League. In 1986 the seniors were defeated in the Junior Championship though gained promotion through the league. The club opened its first spectator stand in 1989.

The reserve team won the Intermediate Championship in 1990, and in 1991 the seniors won the Intermediate League. In 1993 the Minors Won Grade 3 Championship beating Killeeshil in the final while in 1997 the Under 14s won the grade 2 League and Championship double. In the same year, the seniors reached their second ever Tyrone Senior Football Championship Final this time losing to Errigal Ciaran. In 1999 Galbally Pearses' celebrated their golden jubilee and opened their new floodlit training pitch.

In 2000, Galbally Pearses' officially opened their new playing pitch and extension to the spectator stand. In 2001 the seniors won the Jim Devlin Cup while in 2003 the minors won the Grade 2 Championship beating Stewartstown. In 2005, the club helped celebrate the 100th anniversary of Gaelic games and culture in the Galbally Area. In 2006 the seniors won the Division 1B League. In 2008, Galbally Pearses' and the Oonagh Celts' embarked on a project to improve and expand their facilities at Pearse Park. As of December 2009, one of the new playing pitch had been completed with work ongoing on the second pitch and youth pitch. The project was expected to be completed by late 2010.

Galbally were relegated from senior football in 2010. Galbally won the Ulster Intermediate League in 2011 and reached the Tyrone Intermediate Football Championship final the same year before losing to Kildress. Galbally started the 2015 season by winning the Ulster intermediate league for the second time in their history defeating Stewartstown in the final by a scoreline of 2–9 to 2–6. Galbally finished the season by winning the intermediate league with still a game to play after defeating neighbours Killeeshil on a scoreline of 0–18 to 1–6. The reserves also finished the season in style by winning the intermediate reserve championship against Cookstown. In 2017, Galbally won their first ever grade 1 championship at any age group and their first adult championship since 1958 when they defeated Loughmacrory in the Tyrone Under-21 Football Championship final on a score line of 2–12 to 1–13 at Healy Park, Omagh. In 2019, Galbally won both the intermediate league and championship. In the championship final, they defeated neighbours Pomeroy in the final by one point. They reached the Ulster final losing out to Magheracloone.

In 2022, Galbally won the Tyrone Intermediate Championship, having defeated local rivals Pomeroy and Killeeshil enroute to the final in which they beat Edendork. The club went on to win the Ulster Intermediate Championship beating Corduff Gaels of Monaghan in the final. Galbally beat Dunmore MacHales of Galway in the 2022 All-Ireland Intermediate club semifinal and reached the All-Ireland final. Despite a spirited performance against Rathmore of Kerry in Croke Park, Galbally lost by 3 points.

== Honours ==
- Tyrone Intermediate Football Championship (2): 2019, 2022
- Ulster Intermediate Club Football Championship (1): 2022
- Tyrone Junior Football Championship (1): 1958
- Tyrone All-County League Division 1B (1): 2006
- Tyrone All-County League Division 2 (3): 1991, 2015, 2019
- Tyrone All-County League Division 3 (1): 1986

== Notable people ==
- Sean Hurson
- Mickey Murphy
- Paddy Tally
