= Mickey Murphy =

Irish Gaelic footballer

Personal information
- Native name: Mícheál Ó Murchú (Irish)
- Nickname: Spud
- Born: 28 October 1985 (age 41) Dungannon, County Tyrone
- Height: 6 ft 2 in (188 cm)

Sport
- Sport: Gaelic Football
- Position: Midfielder
Club
- Years: Club
- 2003–2006: Galbally Pearses
Inter-county
- Years: County
- 2005–2006: Tyrone
Inter-county titles
- Ulster titles: 3
- All-Irelands: 1
- NFL: 0
- All Stars: 0

Michael "Mickey" Murphy (born 28 October 1985) is a Gaelic footballer who plays for the Galbally Pearses club. He has one All-Ireland Senior Football Championship medal, won in 2005.

From Galbally, County Tyrone, Murphy had a successful run in schools and college football. He was part of the St Ciaran's High School team, Ballygawley, that won the Markey Cup in 2002. He also played for and captained the University of Ulster, Jordanstown team in the Sigerson Cup.
