= Owen Mulligan =

Irish Gaelic footballer

Personal information
- Native name: Eoin Ó Maolagáin (Irish)
- Nickname: Mugsy
- Born: 3 June 1981 (age 45) County Tyrone
- Occupation: Publican
- Height: 1.83 m (6 ft 0 in)

Sport
- Sport: Gaelic football
- Position: Corner forward
Club
- Years: Club
- Cookstown Fr. Rock's
Inter-county
Years	County	Apps (scores)
	Tyrone	37
Inter-county titles
- Ulster titles: 4
- All-Irelands: 3
- NFL: 2
- All Stars: 1

Owen "Mugsy" Mulligan (born 1981) is an Irish Gaelic footballer who played for the Cookstown Fr. Rock's club and for the Tyrone county team. He helped Tyrone win the 2003, 2005 and 2008 All-Ireland Finals.

== Underage achievements ==
At underage level, Mulligan's success is prolific. He achieved notable success with Cookstown Father Rock's from Under 12 upwards, collecting county leagues and championships. As an Under-18, he reached the All-Ireland final in 1997 and 1998, (which includes two Ulster titles), scoring a goal in the 1998 final, and was part of the Tyrone vocational schools team that won the All-Ireland in 1998, although a broken arm prevented him playing in the final. As a pupil at Holy Trinity College, Cookstown, where he was a pupil of former Tyrone Footballing great Peter Canavan, Mulligan won the Tyrone, Ulster and All-Ireland Championships also in 1998.

== Senior career ==
Mulligan was part of the Tyrone team that won the All-Irelands in 2003, 2005 and 2008.

He made an immediate splash to his senior career against local rivals Armagh by scoring a goal in the first thirty seconds. However, his contribution to the game was stifled after that and he was replaced at half time.

His best-remembered performance is probably against Dublin in the drawn All-Ireland Quarter Final in 2005, when he scored what the Irish Independent described as "what can definitely be called one of the greatest goals of all time." When Tyrone were on the backfoot, Mulligan picked up a pass from Stephen O'Neill on the 45m line. He turned his marker, and started heading goalward, dummying two more defenders out of the tackle, and shooting the ball past an oncoming Dublin player and the goalie to rocket the net. This performance almost single-handedly earned him the Ulster writers Player of the Month award.

In the replay, 'Mugsy' showed that he had returned to form by scoring 1-07, and was named the Man of the Match in the 2005 All-Ireland Final, including deftly setting up Tyrone's winning goal with a huge catch, and perfectly timed lay off to Peter Canavan.

His disciplinary record became a talking point in 2007, having been sent off twice in the 2007 National League, and allegedly dropped from the team by manager, Mickey Harte, during the campaign for not showing up to training due to work commitments.

Whilst in Brisbane, Australia, in 2000, he played a key role for Shamrocks Gaelic Football Club in winning the 2000 Queensland Gaelic Football Championship.

Mulligan also represented Tyrone in the 1996 Milk Cup, and played under-15 soccer in Canada.

As a student, he was under the tutelage of Tyrone great, Peter Canavan, who often managed him in the school football team. As Mulligan rose up the ranks, the two players played together on the Tyrone team in the late nineties.
