= Eskra =

Coordinates: 54.481°N 7.206°W

Eskra: Irish: Eiscreach
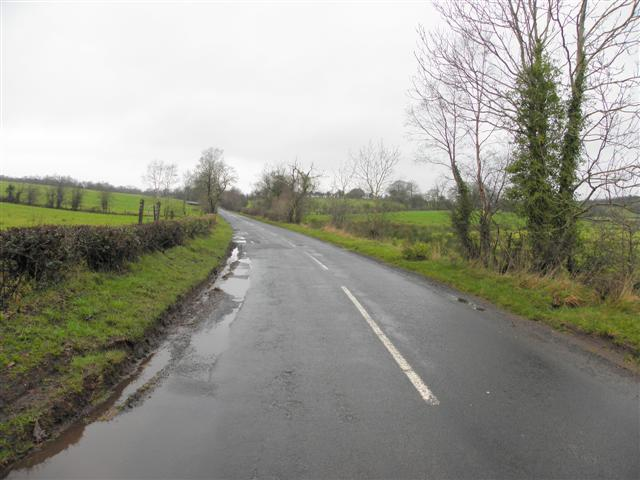
- Corkhill Road traversing Eskra townland

- Location within Northern Ireland
- Population: 815 (1995 Parish Figures)
  - Belfast: 53 miles
- District: Fermanagh and Omagh
- County: County Tyrone
- Country: Northern Ireland
- Sovereign state: United Kingdom
- Post town: OMAGH
- Postcode district: BT78
- Dialling code: 028
- UK Parliament: West Tyrone
- NI Assembly: West Tyrone

Eskra (from Irish Eiscreach) is a small village and townland in southwest County Tyrone, Northern Ireland. It is on the Omagh to Clogher road, about 10 miles from Omagh and about 4 miles from Clogher.

== Geography ==
Eskra lies in the hilly land overlooking Augher and the Clogher valley. Its most notable geological feature and historical site is Knockmany Hill.

== History ==
Evidence of ancient settlement in the area include megalithic monument, a chambered cairn, which is located at the crown of a wooded hill in the area. Sometimes styled 'Aynia's cave', this site is associated with the mythical Queen Aynia, who gave her name to the hill and townland.

A number of penal-era Mass rock sites are located in the area. One such site is 'The Altar Field' near Cullen's Point in the townland of Cormore. Another is in the hollow at the rear of the new church in Lisnarable.

The old St. Patrick's Church, sometimes referred to as the 'Lower Mountain Church', was originally a barn bought from a local farmer and upgraded to serve as a church in the first quarter of the 19th century. The cemetery which developed around it was consecrated on Sunday, 25 October 1840 by Bishop Edward Kernan. On 20 August 1978, the present St. Patrick's Church was dedicated by Bishop Mulligan. The altar stone, the tabernacle, the bell and two restored statues were transferred from the old church to highlight the link with the past.

== Built heritage ==
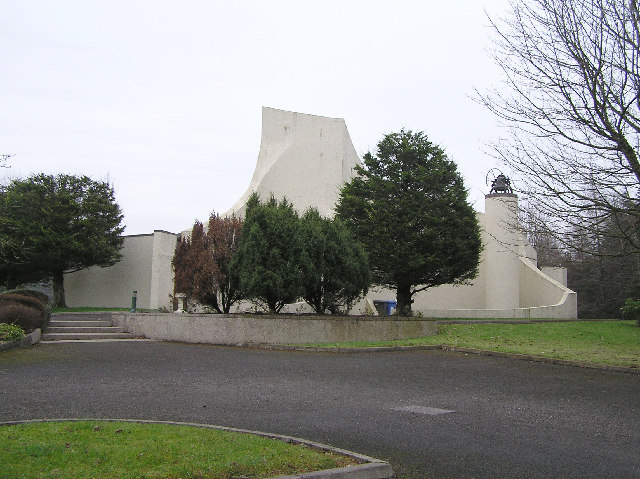
St Patrick's church

The Roman Catholic parish church is named St Patrick's. The Protestant Church of Ireland is named St Mark's. Drinkers in the village are served by the Bridge Tavern (also known as O'Hagan's). The primary school is St. Patrick's. The local Community Centre is widely used for a variety of functions and family events. Listed buildings include St. Mark's Church of Ireland in Dunbiggan and Raveagh House at Corkhill Demesne.

== Demography ==
Until 1869, Eskra was part of Clogher Parish. In 1841, before the Great Famine, the population of the present Eskra Parish was 4,713. In June 1995 there were 815 people in the parish, 70% of whom were Roman Catholic.

== Sport ==
Eskra is home to Eskra Emmetts Gaelic football club.

== Townlands of Eskra parish ==
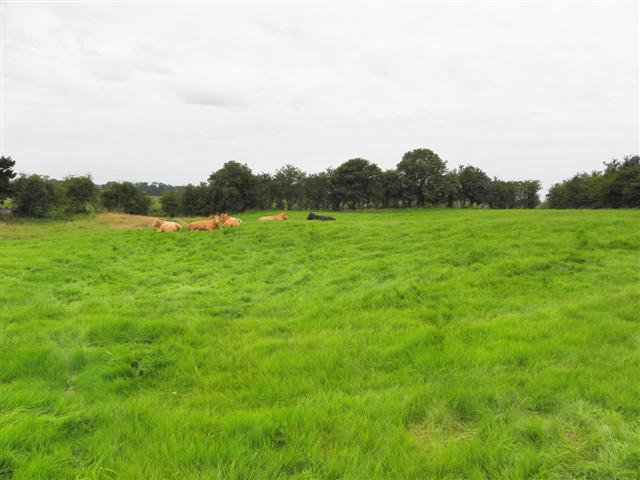
Cows in a field in Eskra townland

(This list is not necessarily complete)

- Altenarvagh.
- Beltany
- Cloneylaugh
- Cormore
- Dromore Lower
- Dunbiggan
- Eskra
- Eskermore
- Fernaghandrum
- Kilnaheery
- Knockmany
- Lisnarable
- Lurganglare
- Tamlaght
- Tatnadavnet
- Tulnafoile
- Tullycorker
- Tychanny
