= Harry Loughran =

Irish Gaelic footballer

Harry Loughran (born 1994) is a former Gaelic footballer who played for the Tyrone county team.

He played five times in the 2018 All-Ireland Senior Football Championship as Tyrone reached the 2018 All-Ireland Senior Football Championship Final, scoring goals against Donegal and Meath. He also scored eight goals for his club Moy during its winning 2018 All-Ireland Intermediate Club Football Championship campaign.

Loughran had surgery for a persistent back injury in November 2019 but announced his retirement at the age of 26 on 24 February 2021.
