= Frank Rodgers (Gaelic footballer) =

Northern Irish Gaelic footballer (1940–2023)

Personal information
- Born: 1940 Beragh, County Tyrone, Northern Ireland
- Died: 30 July 2023 (aged 82) Beragh, County Tyrone, Northern Ireland
- Occupation: Secondary school teacher

Sport
- Sport: Gaelic football
Club
- Years: Club
- Beragh Red Knights
Club titles
- Tyrone titles: 0
Inter-county
- Years: County
- 1958–1968: Tyrone
Inter-county titles
- Ulster titles: 0
- All-Irelands: 0
- NFL: 0

Frank Rodgers (1940 – 30 July 2023) was a Northern Irish Gaelic footballer. At club level he played with Beragh Red Knights and at inter-county level with various Tyrone teams. Rodgers also served as an administrator.

== Playing career ==
Born in Beragh, County Tyrone, Rodgers was educated at Omagh CBS where he played Gaelic football in the MacRory Cup. His club career saw him line out with Beragh Red Knights, however, he enjoyed little success. Rodgers first appeared on the inter-county scene with Tyrone in 1958, when he lined out with the minor, junior and senior teams in the same season. His club and inter-county career came to an end in 1968 after suffering a serious injury.

== Post-playing career ==
Following his retirement from playing, Rodgers continued his career as a teacher at St Mary's College in Irvinestown. He took over as secretary of the Bredagh Red Knights in 1968, a position he held until 1992, and also had a lengthy involvement as a coach at all levels. Rodgers also spent 25 years as secretary of Tyrone GAC, before stepping down in 2000. He also reported on Gaelic games for BBC Radio Ulster's Sunday Sportsound and was the recipient of MacNamee Awards for his work with the Ulster Herald in 1979 and 2004.

== Death ==
Rodgers died on 30 July 2023, at the age of 82.
