= All-Ireland Senior Club Camogie Championship 1991 =

Camogie championship

Winners
- Champions: Mullagh (Galway) (1st title)
- Manager: John Murphy
- Captain: Caroline Loughnane

Runners-up
- Runners-up: Eglish (Tyr)
- Manager: Harold Heron

The 1991 All-Ireland Senior Club Camogie Championship for the leading clubs in the women's team field sport of camogie was won by Mullagh from Galway, who defeated surprise contenders Eglishfrom (Tyrone in the final, played at Ballinasloe.

== Arrangements ==
The championship was organised on the traditional provincial system used in Gaelic Games since the 1880s, with Glen Rovers and Celtic winning the championships of the other two provinces. There were two shock results in the semi-final as Mullagh defeated Glen Rovers with a winning point from Emer Hardiman Eglish celebrated the 25th anniversary of the founding of their club when they defeated Celtic from Dublin. Emer Hardiman scored three goals for Mullagh in the final. Eglish had defeated Loughgiel Shamrocks in the Ulster final by 3-7 to 2-4.

== The Final ==
Emer Hardiman’s three goals for Mullagh in as they led by 2–11 to 0–0.

=== Final stages ===
September 1
Semi-Final

Mullagh (Galway)	2-6 – 1-8	Glen Rovers

Glen Rovers

September 8
Semi-Final

Eglish (Tyr)	3-7 – 2-4	Celtic

Malahide Road

November 24
Final

Mullagh (Galway)	4-13 – 2-7	Eglish (Tyr)

Ballinasloe

Mullagh	Eglish

Mullagh (Galway):
GK	1	Caroline Loughnane (captain)
FB	2	Sheila Coen
RWB	3	Deirdre Hardiman
CB	4	Brigid Fahy
LWB	5	Pamela Nevin
MF	6	Madge Kennedy
MF	7	Cora Corley
MF	8	Triona Dolphin
RWF	9	Aideen Murphy
CF	10	Imelda Hobbins
LWF	11	Alice Murphy
FF	12	Emer Hardiman

Eglish (Tyr):
GK	1	Mairéad Mason
FB	2	Anne Mackle
RWB	3	Gráinne Daly
CB	4	Mary Rose McGready
LWB	5	Nora McGready (captain)
MF	6	Ursula Jordan
MF	7	Catherine Finnegan
MF	8	Leona Fay
RWF	9	Una Donnelly
CF	10	Ann McKenna
LWF	11	Brenda Burke
FF	12	Anne Jordan

Preceded by All-Ireland Senior Club Camogie Championship 1990	All-Ireland Senior Club Camogie Championship; 1964 – present	Succeeded by All-Ireland Senior Club Camogie Championship 1992
