= Derrytresk Fir An Chnoic GAC =

Tyrone-based Gaelic games club

Derrytresk Fir an Chnoic
- Doire Treasc Fir an Chnoic
- Founded: 1903
- County: Tyrone
- Nickname: The Hill
- Colours: Blue & White
- Coordinates: 54°31′03.54″N 6°38′24.01″W

Playing kits
Standard	Reserve

Derrytresk Fir An Chnoic (Irish: Doire Treasc Fir a' Chnoic) is a Gaelic Athletic Association club in Tyrone. The club is based in the townland of Derrytresk near Clonoe in County Tyrone, Northern Ireland.

== Gaelic football ==
The club concentrates on Gaelic football, with the senior team currently competing in Division 3 of the Tyrone All-County Football League and in the Tyrone Junior Football Championship.

Although one of the smallest clubs in the county, with a catchment area of about 60 houses, Derrytresk won the 2011 Tyrone JFC, defeating Killeeshil 0-15 to 0-9. They went on to win the Ulster Junior Club Football Championship, defeating Monaghan's Cremartin 2-5 to 0-10. They won their All-Ireland semi-final against Kerry's Dromid Pearses (1-10 to 7 points), but narrowly lost the final in February 2012 to Naomh Pádraig of Galway.

The club has at times played in the Senior Championship, reaching the final in 1949 when they were defeated by An Charraig Mhór.

== Camogie ==
An associated camogie club, called Cailíní a' Chnoic, plays at the same home venue.

== Honours ==
- Tyrone Junior Football Championship (2): 1955, 2011
- Ulster Junior Club Football Championship (1): 2011
- All-Ireland Junior Club Football Championship (0): (runners-up in 2011)
- Tyrone All-County League Division 3 (3): 1987, 1992, 1994
- Tyrone All-County League Division 3A (1): 2025

== Notable players ==
- Mick Cushnahan (died 2013), member of Tyrone's 1947 All-Ireland Minor winning team, and (after transfer to Derrylaughan) the 1956-57 Ulster Championship winning teams
