= Martin Penrose =

Irish Gaelic footballer

Personal information
- Born: County Tyrone

Sport
- Sport: Gaelic football
- Position: Corner Forward/Wing half forward
Clubs
- Years: Club
- 2001-2011 2011-: Aghyaran St Davog's; Carrickmore St Colmcille's
Inter-county
- Years: County
- 2005-: Tyrone
Inter-county titles
- Ulster titles: 3
- All-Irelands: 2
- NFL: 0
- All Stars: 0

Martin Penrose is a Gaelic footballer for the Tyrone county team. He won two All-Ireland Senior Football Championships with his county.

Penrose plays club football for Carrickmore, although, until recently, he played with Aghyaran St Davog's, Achadh Uí Aráin Naoimh Dabhóige.

== Honours ==
- 3 Ulster Senior Football Championships (2007, 2009, 2010)
- 2 All-Ireland Senior Football Championships (2005, 2008)
- 4 Dr McKenna Cups (2005, 2006, 2007, 2012)
- 2 Ulster Under-21 Football Championships (2003, 2004)
- 1 Ulster Minor Football Championship (2001)
- 1 All-Ireland Minor Football Championship (2001)
