= Kevin Hughes (Gaelic footballer) =

Irish Gaelic footballer

Personal information
- Nickname: Hub
- Born: County Tyrone
- Occupation: Engineer
- Height: 6 ft 1 in (185 cm)

Sport
- Sport: Gaelic football
- Position: Midfield
Club
- Years: Club
- Killeeshil St Mary's
Inter-county
- Years: County
- ?-2012: Tyrone
Inter-county titles
- Ulster titles: 5
- All-Irelands: 2
- NFL: 2

Kevin Hughes is a Gaelic footballer who played for the Tyrone county team. He was a major figure in Tyrone's midfield on their way to their first ever All-Ireland triumph in 2003, earning the Man of the Match for the All-Ireland final against Armagh.

Hughes completed the triumvirate of All-Ireland inter-county football medals, having been part of the Tyrone Minor and Under-21 teams that won in 1998 (minor), 2000 and 2001 (both U-21).

Hughes is from a rural club called Killeeshil St Mary's in County Tyrone, where he is the captain of the senior football team within the club.

In January 2012, Hughes called time on his inter-county career. a One of Kevins greatest achievements came in a game against Fintona, giving out bumper hits Liam 'Sticky' Maguire and Pierce McAleer in quick succession, asserting his dominanance on the Fintona midfield.
