= Fintona Pearses GAC =

Tyrone-based Gaelic games club

- Fionntamhnach Na Piarsaigh CLG
- Founded: 1917
- County: Tyrone
- Nickname: The Pearses
- Colours: Green and White
- Grounds: St Lawrence's Park
- Coordinates: 54°29′35″N 7°19′43″W

Playing kits
Standard	Reserve

Senior Club Championships
	All Ireland	Ulster champions	Tyrone champions
Football:	-	-	2

Fintona Pearses (Irish: Fionntamhnach Na Piarsaigh) is a Gaelic Athletic Association club based in Fintona, County Tyrone, Northern Ireland. It is a member of the Tyrone GAA county board and is named after the Irish poet and revolutionary, Patrick Pearse.

The club primarily concentrates on Gaelic football for both men and women, with boys hurling teams fielded at youth level. Its home venue is called St Lawrence's Park, located just outside the village on the Tattymoyle Road.

As of 2025, the senior Gaelic football team competes in Division 2 of the Tyrone All-County Football League as well as the Tyrone Intermediate Football Championship.

== History ==
Fintona Pearses was founded in 1917 and, despite some stop-starts in the 1920s, the club has been continuously active since 1932. At the time of founding, there was already a club in the village, Fintona Davitts, which had been in existence since 1907 and had won the Tyrone Senior Football Championship in 1914. The two sides met each other in competition twice in 1917. The Davitts club, however, went out of existence shortly afterwards.

The club won the Tyrone Senior Football Championship in 1938, defeating Cookstown in the final. The last appearance in the senior club final was in 1979 when they lost out to Carrickmore.

A Tyrone Intermediate Football Championship title was claimed in 1978 defeating Killyclogher in the final. The club also won the Tyrone Junior Football Championship title in 1975 after beating Gortin in the decider.

In 2023, the Mens Senior football team won the Tyrone Junior Football Championship, defeating neighbours Drumragh by a point after extra time and bridging a 45 year gap from their last championship title win in 1978. In doing so, the Mens Senios team earned promotion to the Division 2 League and Intermediate championship grade for the first time since 2008. They went on to represent Tyrone in the Ulster Junior Club Football Championship, defeating Ballyhegan (Armagh) in the preliminary round and Drumaness (Down) in the quarter final. They were eliminated at the semi final stage by Blackhill (Monaghan). In addition, the Minor boys football team won the Grade 2 Minor League title beating Badoney in the final 2-9 to 1-9, while the Under 20 Mens team lost out in their Grade 2 League final to Moortown.

In 2025, the Minor boys 1st football team won the club's first ever underage Grade 1 title, defeating Carrickmore in the Grade 1 League final at Healy Park 2-10 to 2-9, while the 2nd team won the Minor football Grade 4 Championship, beating Clogher 2-16 to 1-14 in the final at Killyclogher. Additionally at county level, two club players (Padraig Goodman and Peter Colton) won places on the Electric Ireland 2025 Minor Football All-Star team of the year with Colton winning Football Player of the Year, both as part of the Tyrone team that won the All-Ireland Minor Football Championship.

Fintona Pearses is the only club in Tyrone to have won the Senior, Intermediate, Junior, and all three Reserve Football Championships in its existence.

=== Ladies Football ===
A separate Ladies Gaelic football club, of the same name, was founded in 1996 and competed in Tyrone competitions in 1997. In 2022, separate votes among the members of both the GAA & LGFA clubs approved a merger of the two clubs & as of 2023, the Ladies and Mens Gaelic football teams compete under a single Fintona Pearses GAA club banner.

=== Camogie ===
Fintona was also home to the first camogie club in Tyrone, called Fintona Rose Kavanaghs which was founded around the same time as Fintona Davitts.

== Honours ==
=== Mens Football ===
- Tyrone Senior Football Championship (2): 1914, 1938
- Tyrone Intermediate Football Championship (1): 1978
- Tyrone Junior Football Championship (3): 1975, 2023, 2026

=== Ladies Football ===
- Tyrone Junior Football Championship (1): 2005
