= Pomeroy Plunketts GAC =

Tyrone-based Gaelic games club

Pomeroy Plunketts
- Na Pluinceidí, Cabhan á Choarthainn
- Founded: 1916
- County: Tyrone
- Colours: Black and Amber
- Grounds: Plunkett Park, Pomeroy
- Coordinates: 54°35′36.57″N 6°56′12.94″W

Playing kits
Standard colours

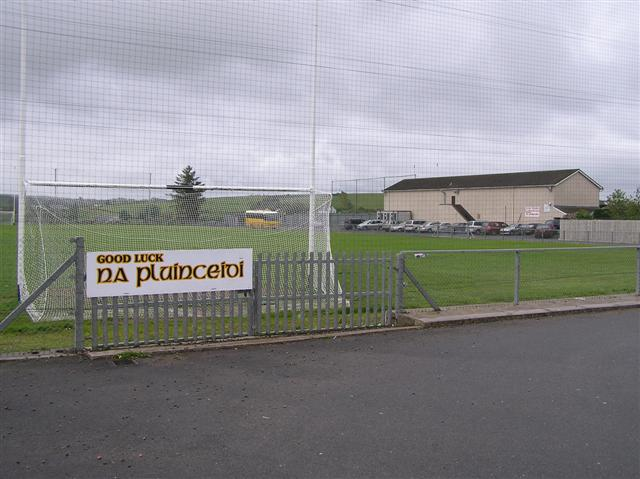
Sign at Plunkett Park

Pomeroy Plunketts is a Gaelic Athletic Association club based in the village of Pomeroy in County Tyrone, Northern Ireland.

== History ==
The club was founded in 1916, dedicated to the memory of Joseph Plunkett, whose face is featured on the club's crest.

After winning the Tyrone Intermediate Football Championship in 2004, Pomeroy went on to win the first official Ulster Intermediate Club Football Championship title with a win over Moneyglass in the final. The Plunketts went on to reach the final of the All-Ireland Intermediate Club Football Championship with a win over Wolfe Tones. Pomeroy lost the final by six points to Carbery Rangers.

In 2016, after beating Derrylaughan in the Tyrone Intermediate final, a second Ulster Intermediate crown was won after a twelve-point final win over Donaghmoyne. The club's most recent championship success was in 2023, winning the Tyrone Intermediate Championship.

Pomeroy's Kieran McGeary was named GAA/GPA Footballer of the Year in 2021.

== Honours ==
- Tyrone Intermediate Football Championship: (5)
  - 1967, 1991, 2004, 2016, 2023
- Ulster Intermediate Club Football Championship: (2)
  - 2004, 2016
- Tyrone Junior Football Championship: (3)
  - 1935, 1945, 1984
