= Tyrone Junior Football Championship =

Annual Gaelic football competition

- Current season or competition: 2026 Tyrone Junior Football Championship
- Irish: Craobh Sóisear Peile Tír Eoghain
- Code: Gaelic football
- Founded: 1904
- Region: County Tyrone, Ulster (GAA)
- Trophy: Pat Darcy Cup
- No. of teams: 18
- Title holders: Fintona Pearses (3rd title)
- First winner: Coalisland Owen Roes
- Most titles: Moortown St Malachy's; Rock St Patrick's (5 titles)
- Sponsors: Connollys of Moy
- Official website: tyronegaa.ie

The Tyrone Junior Football Club Championship (known for sponsorship reasons as the Connollys of Moy Tyrone Junior Football Club Championship) is an annual Gaelic football competition contested by lower-tier Tyrone GAA clubs. The Tyrone County Board of the Gaelic Athletic Association has organised it since 1904.

Fintona Pearses are the title holders (2026) defeating Stewartstown Harps by 2-16 to 2-14 in the final on 10 October 2026.

== History ==
The first tournament was held in 1904 and Coalisland Owen Roes won that by defeating Dungannon Emmets in the final.

The trophy given to the winning club was renamed as the Pat Darcy Cup in 2018.

From 2018, all championship games have been streamed live on Tyrone TV.

== Honours ==
The trophy presented to the winners is the Pat Darcy Cup. Pat Darcy was from the Tattyreagh club and was a former Chairman of the Tyrone County Board from 2004-2009.

The winners of the Tyrone Junior Football Championship qualify to represent their county in the Ulster Junior Club Football Championship. They often do well there, winning it on numerous occasions:- Rock (2007, 2014, 2016), Stewartstown (2004, 2022), Greencastle (2006) and Derrytresk (2011).

The winners can, in turn, go on to play in the All-Ireland Junior Club Football Championship. Greencastle in 2007 are the only Tyrone club to have won the All-Ireland Junior Club Football Championship.

The winners also gain promotion to Division 2 of the Tyrone All-County Football League for the following season, regardless of their final standing in the Division 3 league that year. Therefore as the winners compete in the Tyrone Intermediate Football Championship the following year, the holders do not defend their title.

== List of finals ==
- Teams in black no longer exist

Year	Winner	Score	Opponent	Score	Date	Venue	Referee	Winning Captain
1904-5	Coalisland Owen Roes	0-11	Dungannon Emmets	1-00	30/04/05	Springfield Park, Dungannon	Mr. McDyer	
1905-06	Killyclogher St. Patrick's							
	No J.F.C until 1927							
1927	Donaghmore Rossas	3-03	Ardboe	0-02	25/03/28	Dungannon	J. McKernan (Coalisland)	
1928	Declared Null and Void							
1929	Washingbay Shamrocks	2-03	Coalisland Mitchell's	1-03	21/09/30			
1930	Not Played							
1931	Dungannon Clarkes II	5-02	Galbally St. Joseph's	1-03	20/11/32	Dungannon	J. Corr (Coalisland)	Pat McQuaid
1932	Not Played							
1933	Donaghmore St. Joseph's	3-05	Augher Young Irelands	0-07	22/10/33	Coalisland	Fr. J. McGilligan (An Charraig Mhór)	M. Campbell
1934	Moortown St. Malachy's	0-03	Clady St. Brigid's	2-02	03/02/35	Omagh	J. Donnelly	Liam Lavery
	Clady Disqualified							
1935	Pomeroy Plunketts	3-09	Greencastle Erin's Hope	1-03	31/05/36	Dungannon	T. Bradley (Coalisland)	Hugh M. O'Hare
1936	Greencastle Erin's Hope	0-08	Cookstown Brian Óg	1-02	04/07/37	Omagh	D. Hughes (Pomeroy)	
1937	Tummery Wolfe Tones	4-02	Rock St. Patrick's	1-02	06/11/38	Cookstown		
1938	Edendork St. Malachy's	0-03	Brackey Wolfe Tones	2-06	12/03/39	Omagh	J. McMahon	
	Brackey Disqualified							
1939	Mountjoy Emmetts	4-01	Brackey Wolfe Tones	0-02	07/04/40	Coalisland	Fr. McKee	
1940	Brackaville Owen Roes	2-03	Drummullan Wolfe Tones	0-07	23/03/41	Stewartstown	Fr. S. Caraher (Stewartstown)	
1941	Tattysallagh St. Eugene's	0-04	Kilmenagh O'Donovan Rossa	0-04	26/04/42	Coalisland	J. Kilpatrick	
(r)	Tattysallagh St. Eugene's	2-04	Kilmenagh O'Donovan Rossa	1-04	14/06/42	Omagh	Fr T. Kirk (Trillick)	
1942	Washingbay Shamrocks	0-14	Galbally St. Joseph's	0-06	01/11/42	Dungannon	Fr. E. Devlin	Johnny Taggart
1943	Mountjoy Emmetts	1-03	Donaghmore St. Joseph's	2-00	21/11/43			
(r)	Mountjoy Emmetts	1-03	Donaghmore St. Joseph's	1-00	12/03/44			
1944	Mountjoy Emmetts		Coalisland Fianna II		??/12/44			
1945	Pomeroy Plunketts	0-07	Gortin St. Patrick's	0-06	16/09/45	Pomeroy	P. Gallagher	
1946	Coalisland Fianna II	1-04	Greencastle St. Patrick's	1-04	24/11/46	Omagh	J. Monaghan	
(r)	Coalisland Fianna II	2-00	Greencastle St. Patrick's	0-03	20/04/47	Pomeroy		
1947	Beragh St. Mary's	0-04	Washingbay Shamrocks	0-03	11/04/48	Pomeroy	M. Toal (An Charraig Mhór)	
1948	Moortown St. Malachy's II	3-05	Cranagh	0-01	24/04/49	Pomeroy	P. Begley	
1949	Derrylaughan Kevin Barry's	2-03	Dungannon Clarkes II	1-01	29/01/50	Coalisland		
1950	Moortown St. Malachy's II	1-03	Cappagh	0-05	15/10/50	Pomeroy	K. Doherty	Felix Conlon
1951	Newtownstewart St. Eugene's	0-04	Moortown St. Malachy's II	0-02	18/05/52	Pomeroy	M. Toal (An Charraig Mhór)	
1952	Moortown St. Malachy's II	2-04	Newtownstewart St. Eugene's	1-03	02/11/52	Pomeroy	C. Hamill (Donaghmore)	
1953	Moy Tír na nÓg	2-10	Cappagh	2-03	23/08/53	Dungannon	A. Dillon (Dungannon)	Paddy Reilly
1954	Donaghmore St. Patrick's	4-04	Cranagh	0-03	09/01/55	Pomeroy	A. Dillon (Dungannon)	F. McCloskey
1955	Derrytresk Fir An Chnoic		Cranagh					
	1955 Final not played. Cranagh had been suspended.							
1956	Dunamanagh St. Patrick's	4-02	Moortown St. Malachy's II	1-06	25/11/56	Pomeroy		Pat McGlynn
1957	Edendork St. Malachy's	1-09	Creggan	0-02	20/10/57	Pomeroy		
1958	Galbally Pearses	3-04	Creggan	0-01	26/10/58	Pomeroy	P. McGinn (Pomeroy)	
1959	Ballygawley St. Ciaran's	3-06	Ardboe O'Donovan Rossa II	1-05	25/10/59	Dungannon	J. Devlin	Eugene Tierney
1960	Benburb Eoghan Ruadh	2-05	Strabane St. Colman's	2-04	30/10/60	Pomeroy	P. Devlin (Omagh)	
1961	Gortin St. Patrick's	4-11	Kildress Wolfe Tones	0-08	08/10/61	Pomeroy	J. Martin (Omagh)	
1962	Ardboe O'Donovan Rossa II	1-01	Dromore St. Dympna's	0-03	28/10/62	Dungannon	T. Devlin (Dungannon)	
1963	Dromore St. Dympna's	1-05	Eglish St. Patrick's	0-06	08/09/63	Pomeroy	J. Martin (Omagh)	T. Hunter
1964	Augher St. Macartan's	1-12	Kildress Wolfe Tones	2-06	06/09/64	Dungannon	J. Martin (Omagh)	Jim Rice
1965	Benburb Eoghan Ruadh	1-05	Gortin St. Patrick's	1-02	21/11/65	Pomeroy	S. Faloon (Donaghmore)	
1966	Kildress Wolfe Tones	3-11	Omagh St. Enda's II	2-04	18/09/66	Pomeroy	S. Carberry (Donaghmore)	Sean McCullagh
1967	Dunamanagh St. Patrick's	2-06	Moortown St. Malachy's	1-06	17/12/67	Pomeroy	F. Donnelly (An Charraig Mhór)	Mickey Lindsay
1968	Killyman St. Mary's	2-06	Killyclogher St. Mary's	1-04	01/09/68	Dungannon	D. Conway (Coalisland)	Gary McGahan
1969	Moortown St. Malachy's	2-12	Dregish St. Vincent's	0-07	31/08/69	Dungannon	P. Devlin (Omagh)	Joe Crozier
1970	Dregish St. Vincent's	2-07	Derrytresk Fir An Chnoic	2-04	18/10/70	Killeeshil	P. Quinn (Killyclogher)	Damien Morris
1971	Ardboe O'Donovan Rossa II	1-06	Greencastle St. Patrick's	1-05	10/10/71	Coalisland	S. Kennedy (Dungannon)	Brian Pat O'Neill
1972	Clogher Eire Óg	0-08	Eglish St. Patrick's II	1-03	01/10/72	Dungannon	B. Taggart (Clonoe)	Brian Pearson
1973	Eglish St. Patrick's II	1-08	Strabane Lámh Dhearg	1-06	21/10/73	Omagh	A. Kelly (Edendork)	Liam Hamill
1974	Aghaloo O'Neill's	0-08	Loughmacrory St. Teresa's	0-03	08/09/74	Pomeroy	M. McCullagh (Gortin)	M. McCaughey
1975	Fintona Pearses	2-10	Gortin St. Patrick's	1-09	10/08/75	Omagh	P. Donaghy (Moy)	Seamus Toal
1976	Dregish Pearse Óg	3-06	Killeeshil St. Mary's	3-05	12/09/76	Beragh	P. Mullan (Omagh)	Pat Morris
1977	Killyclogher St. Mary's	0-14	Greencastle St. Patrick's	0-03	11/09/77	Beragh	M. Harvey (Pomeroy)	Eugene Bradley
1978	Cookstown Fr. Rock's	1-08	Greencastle St. Patrick's	1-07	06/08/78	Pomeroy	B. Neville (Killyclogher)	
	The 1978 final was replayed due a successful appeal by Greencastle.							
(r)	Cookstown Fr. Rock's	0-14	Greencastle St. Patrick's	0-01	15/10/78	Pomeroy	S. Corr (Coalisland)	Dominic Fitzpatrick
1979	Moy Tír Na nÓg	4-07	Brackaville Owen Roes	2-04	05/08/79	Dungannon	J. Martin (Omagh)	Teddy Cavanagh
1980	Loughmacrory St. Teresa's	1-10	Brocagh Emmetts	2-05	03/08/80	Dungannon	E. Mullan (Ballygawley)	Sean Donaghy
1981	Brocagh Emmetts	1-11	Beragh Red Knights	2-06	07/08/81	Dungannon	F. McElwee (Cookstown)	Peter Teague
1982	Rock St. Patrick's	2-12	Eskra Emmetts	0-07	01/08/82	Pomeroy	J. O'Hagan (Killyman)	Sean Ruddy
1983	Dregish Pearse Óg	2-05	Glenelly St. Joseph's	1-05	02/10/83	Carrickmore	B. Taggart (Clonoe)	Don O'Kane
1984	Pomeroy Plunketts	3-12	Urney St. Columba's	0-02	09/09/84	Dunmoyle	S. Corr (Coalisland)	Kieran Murphy
1985	Dunamanagh St. Patrick's	1-02	Loughmacrory St. Teresa's	0-05	15/09/85	Omagh	P.J McDermott (Greencastle)	
(r)	Dunamanagh St. Patrick's	1-09	Loughmacrory St. Teresa's	0-02	29/09/85	Omagh	P.J McDermott (Greencastle)	John Donaghy
1986	Brocagh Emmetts	1-08	Galbally Pearses	0-08	26/10/86	Dungannon	J. Heaney (Beragh)	Sean O'Neill
1987	Drumragh Sarsfields	1-09	Urney St. Columba's	0-05	27/09/87	Pomeroy	P. Taggart (Clonoe)	Enda Mullin
1988	Beragh Red Knights	2-08	Strabane Sigerson's	2-04	11/09/88	Carrickmore	L. Duffy (Cookstown)	Hugh McNamee
1989	Killyman St. Mary's	1-07	Aghaloo O'Neill's	0-05	20/08/89	Pomeroy	T. McBride (Omagh)	Malachy McVeigh
1990	Urney St. Columba's	2-08	Aghaloo O'Neill's	0-07	12/08/90	Gortin	M. Starrs (Drumragh)	Paul McCrory
1991	Aghaloo O'Neill's	0-13	Strabane Sigerson's	1-09	25/08/91	Pomeroy	H. McNally (Moortown)	Patrick McGinn
1992	Greencastle St. Patrick's	1-07	Kildress Wolfe Tones	0-08	09/08/92	Carrickmore	B. Taggart (Clonoe)	Michael Clarke
1993	Loughmacrory St. Teresa's	0-13	Clogher Eire Óg	1-03	15/08/93	Omagh	P. O'Neill (Derrytresk)	Gary Conway
1994	Kildress Wolfe Tones	4-10	Brackaville Owen Roes	3-07	07/08/94	Donaghmore	E. Mullan (Errigal Ciaran)	Sean Treacy
1995	Newtownstewart St. Eugene's	1-03	Tattyreagh St. Patrick's	0-03	05/11/95	Omagh	D. O'Neill (Derrylaughan)	Dermot O'Brien
1996	Brackaville Owen Roes	4-05	Eskra Emmetts	0-10	28/09/96	Omagh	K. Skelton (Drumquin)	Sean McNally
1997	Clann Na nGael	3-15	Tattyreagh St. Patrick's	1-09	10/08/97	Carrickmore	P. O'Neill (Cookstown)	Cathal O'Neill
1998	Greencastle St. Patrick's	0-09	Rock St. Patrick's	2-02	13/09/98	Pomeroy	J. Kerlin (Clann Na nGael)	Sean Teague
1999	Drumragh Sarsfields	3-06	Stewartstown Harps	0-11	22/08/99	Pomeroy	S. Harte (Dungannon)	Brian Campbell
2000	Clogher Eire Óg	0-16	Dregish Pearse Óg	0-08	27/08/00	Carrickmore	M. Sludden (Dromore)	Martin Shortt
2001	Dregish Pearse Óg	2-07	Newtownstewart St. Eugene's	1-09	02/09/01	Omagh	S. Quinn (Brackaville)	Martin Timoney
2002	Urney St. Columba's	2-08	Eskra Emmetts	0-10	25/08/02	Omagh	K. Kelly (Kildress)	Sean McNulty
2003	Eskra Emmetts	0-08	Newtownstewart St. Eugene's	0-07	12/10/03	Omagh	P. Davidson (Brocagh)	Cathal McNamee
2004	Stewartstown Harps	1-09	Fintona Pearses	1-06	03/10/04	Omagh	S. McNamee (Newtownstewart)	John Devlin
2005	Killyman St. Mary's	0-11	Brocagh Emmetts	1-03	14/08/05	Omagh	J. Kerlin (Clann Na nGael)	Paul McVeigh
2006	Greencastle St. Patrick's	1-10	Tattyreagh St. Patrick's	2-07	01/10/06	Omagh	S. Dorrity (Coalisland)	
(r)	Greencastle St. Patrick's	1-05	Tattyreagh St. Patrick's	0-07	08/10/06	Omagh	C. O'Hagan (Brackaville)	Martin Conway
2007	Rock St. Patrick's	0-12	Beragh Red Knights	1-09	30/09/07	Omagh	J. McCann (Eglish)	
(r)	Rock St. Patrick's	1-12	Beragh Red Knights	2-05	05/10/07	Omagh	S. Quinn (Brackaville)	Martin McCreesh
2008	Augher St. Macartan's	1-09	Aghaloo O'Neill's	0-09	19/10/08	Omagh	E. McHugh (Aghyaran)	Stephen McCaffrey
2009	Newtownstewart St. Eugene's	2-08	Brocagh Emmetts	0-11	18/09/09	Omagh	J. McElroy (Aghaloo)	Kevin Gallagher
2010	Killyman St. Mary's	0-13	Stewartstown Harps	1-09	10/10/10	Omagh	F. Gallagher (Trillick	Sean Hughes
2011	Derrytresk Fir An Chnoic	0-15	Killeeshil St. Mary's	0-09	16/10/11	Omagh	F. Daly (Gortin)	Cathal O'Neill
2012	Brackaville Owen Roes	1-14	Aghaloo O'Neill's	1-08	14/10/12	Omagh	S. Hurson (Galbally)	Cahir McGuinness
2013	Killeeshil St. Mary's	1-08	Loughmacrory St. Teresa's	1-06	20/10/13	Omagh	B. McCallion (Castlederg)	Packie McMullan
2014	Rock St. Patrick's	0-09	Derrytresk Fir An Chnoic	0-09	05/10/14	Omagh	S. Meehan (Glenelly)	
(r)	Rock St. Patrick's	2-08	Derrytresk Fir An Chnoic	0-10	12/10/14	Coalisland	F. Ward (Errigal Ciaran)	Aidan Girvan
2015	Brackaville Owen Roes	0-09	Aghaloo O'Neill's	0-08	04/10/15	Omagh	S. Brady (Moy)	Sean McNally Jnr
2016	Rock St. Patrick's	1-09	Tattyreagh St. Patrick's	1-06	02/10/16	Dungannon	D. Dorman (Brocagh)	Tommy Bloomer
2017	Tattyreagh St. Patrick's	2-11	Clogher Eire Óg	2-04	08/10/17	Carrickmore	M. Conroy (Moy)	Collie Harkin
2018	Newtownstewart St. Eugene's	1-12	Beragh Red Knights	1-10	07/10/18	Omagh	S. Campbell (Stewartstown)	Damian Coyle
2019	Rock St. Patrick's	2-14	Kildress Wolfe Tones	1-14	06/10/19	Omagh	K. Eannetta (Omagh)	Aidan McGarrity
2020	Kildress Wolfe Tones	3-09	Drumragh Sarsfields	1-08	04/10/20	Omagh	C. Forbes (Ardboe)	Philip Lennon / Dean McNally
2021	Cookstown Fr. Rock's	2-10	Eskra Emmetts	1-06	07/11/21	Omagh	M. Loughran (Errigal Ciaran)	Conor O'Hare
2022	Stewartstown Harps	2-12	Aghaloo O'Neill's	0-12	23/10/22	Omagh	C. Bell (Killeeshil)	Mark Rooney
2023	Fintona Pearses	1-10	Drumragh Sarsfields	0-12	15/10/23	Omagh	G. Gormley (Drumquin)	Niall Murray
2024	Killeeshil St Mary's	2-07	Aghaloo O'Neill's	0-12	13/10/24	Omagh	S. Devenney (Drumquin)	Tomás Hoy
2025	Clogher Eire Óg	1-21	Drumragh Sarsfields	0-12	18/10/25	Omagh	P. Gallagher (Castlederg)	Conor Shields
2026	Fintona Pearses	2-16	Stewartstown Harps	2-14	10/10/26	Omagh	N. Conlan (Moortown)	Peter McGlinn

== Wins listed by club ==
#	Club	Wins	Years won
1	Moortown	5	1934, 1948, 1950, 1952, 1969
1	Rock	5	1982, 2007, 2014, 2016, 2019
3	Brackaville	4	1940, 1996, 2012, 2015
3	Dregish	4	1970, 1976, 1983, 2001
3	Greencastle	4	1936, 1992, 1998, 2006
3	Killyman	4	1968, 1989, 2005, 2010
3	Newtownstewart	4	1951, 1995, 2009, 2018
8	Clogher	3	1972, 2000, 2025
8	Donaghmore	3	1927, 1933, 1954
8	Dunamanagh	3	1956, 1967, 1985
8	Fintona	3	1975, 2023, 2026
8	Kildress	3	1966, 1994, 2020
8	Mountjoy	3	1939, 1943, 1944
8	Pomeroy	3	1935, 1945, 1984
15	Aghaloo	2	1974, 1991
15	Ardboe	2	1962, 1971
15	Augher	2	1964, 2008
15	Beragh	2	1947, 1988
15	Benburb	2	1960, 1965
15	Brocagh	2	1981, 1986
15	Coalisland	2	1904-05, 1946
15	Cookstown	2	1978, 2021
15	Derrytresk	2	1955, 2011
15	Drumragh	2	1987, 1999
15	Edendork	2	1938, 1957
15	Killeeshil	2	2013, 2024
15	Killyclogher	2	1905-06, 1977
15	Loughmacrory	2	1980, 1993
15	Moy	2	1953, 1979
15	Stewartstown	2	2004, 2022
15	Urney	2	1990, 2002
15	Washingbay	2	1929, 1942
33	Ballygawley	1	1959
33	Clann Na nGael	1	1996
33	Derrylaughan	1	1949
33	Dromore	1	1963
33	Dungannon	1	1931
33	Eglish	1	1973
33	Eskra	1	2003
33	Galbally	1	1958
33	Gortin	1	1961
33	Tattyreagh	1	2017
33	Tattysallagh	1	1941
33	Tummery	1	1937
