= Dregish Pearse Óg GAC =

Tyrone-based Gaelic games club

Dregish Pearse Óg
- Deargais Phiarais Óig
- Founded: 1968
- County: Tyrone
- Colours: Maroon, Green & White
- Coordinates: 54°40′03.13″N 7°27′32.70″W

Playing kits
| Standard | Reserve |

Dregish Pearse Óg (Irish: Deargais Phiarais Óig) was a Gaelic Athletic Association club. The club was based in the townland of Dregish between Drumquin and Castlederg in County Tyrone, Northern Ireland.

The club, which concentrated on Gaelic football, was named after the Irish Revolutionary Padraig Pearse and drew in players from the rural areas of the parish of Ardstraw West.

In November 2019, Dregish Pearse Óg amalgamated with neighbouring club Newtownstewart St Eugene's to form Naomh Eoghan GAC. Dregish had for a number of years been struggling with playing numbers and was rumoured to be disbanding before the amalgamation with Newtownstewart was announced.
