= Urney St Columba's GAC =

Tyrone-based Gaelic games club

St Columba's, Urney
- Naomh Columba, Urnaí
- Founded: 1945
- County: Tyrone
- Colours: Green and Gold
- Grounds: Páirc Naomh Columba
- Coordinates: 54°47′39.43″N 7°31′53.29″W

Playing kits
Standard colours

Urney St Columba’s is a Gaelic Athletic Association club based in the village of Clady in County Tyrone, Northern Ireland.

The Honourable The Irish Society has provided it with a grant.

A club member received an Ulster GAA President's Award for 2020.

== Honours ==
- Tyrone Junior Football Championship (2)
  - 1990, 2002
