= Stewartstown Harps GFC =

Tyrone-based Gaelic games club

Stewartstown Harps
- An Chraobh na Cláirseacha
- Founded: 1912
- County: Tyrone
- Nickname: The Harps
- Colours: White and Red
- Grounds: Mullaghmoyle Park
- Coordinates: 54°33′58″N 6°41′22″W

Playing kits
Standard colours

Senior Club Championships
	All Ireland	Ulster champions	Tyrone champions
Football:	0	0	2

Stewartstown Harps is a Gaelic Athletic Association club which was founded in 1912 and based in the village of Stewartstown in County Tyrone, Northern Ireland. The club plays its games in Mullaghmoyle Park. The club has won county titles at Senior, Intermediate and Junior grades, and won the Ulster Junior Club Football Championship title in both 2004 and 2022.

== History ==
Stewartstown Harps was founded in 1912 and won their first Tyrone Senior Football Championship in 1924. The Harps also won the league the same year. They went out of existence in the 1940s but re-formed in 1956.

Within a few years of reforming, the club captured the top prize in Tyrone Gaelic football - the O'Neill Cup - for a second time, following a victory over Derrylaughan Kevin Barrys in September 1962. In 1971, the club secured another county title, winning the All-County League Division One.

Along with the senior championship, an intermediate league was won in 1964 along with senior league titles in 1971, 1973, and 1975, and a senior championship final appearance to Ardboe coming in between in 1972.

A Tyrone Intermediate Football Championship win in 1980 was the last championship title for the Harps until 2004, when they won the Tyrone Junior Football Championship.

Stewartstown also won the Ulster Junior Club Football Championship in 2004, beating Cremartin in the final. The Harps qualified for the All-Ireland final, but were outclassed by Finuge.

In 2006, the Harps regained promotion to Senior football after a period of 26 years by winning their second intermediate championship. In Ulster, the Harps were victorious in the quarter-final, beating St Brigid's GAC in Healy Park before moving on to the semi-final against Ballymacnab Round Towers GAC. The Harps were defeated in Breffni Park after a replay.

In 2009, they were again relegated to Junior, but went on a successful run in the league in 2010, only being beaten once. In the championship, Stewartstown made it to the final against local rivals Killyman St Mary's GAC. The Harps lost the final by one point.

In 2016, the Harps won the Tyrone U-21 G1 Championship for the first time, defeating Coalisland Fianna in the final played at O’Neill Park, Dungannon. The Harps then played in the Ulster U-21 tournament. After winning against Donaghmoyne in the quarter-final, they bowed out in the semi-final stage to Crossmaglen Rangers.

The senior team won the Junior league title in 2022, going undefeated in the process. This was followed by winning the Tyrone Junior Football Championship, defeating Aghaloo by 2–12 to 0–12 in the 2022 final. Following wins against Teconnaught And Letterkenny Gaels, the Harps played Drumlane in the Ulster Junior final. Stewartstown came out on top after a penalty shoot-out to win their second title. In January 2023, Stewartstown beat Clifden in the All-Ireland semi-final to set up a final date with Fossa. The All-Ireland took place on 15 January 2023. Fossa won the match by 0–19 to 1–13 in a bad-tempered game which featured six red cards, including four for Stewartstown.

== Facilities ==
Since the club's reformation in 1957, the Harps based its facilities at Mullaghmoyle Park in the townland of Mullaghmoyle just outside the village of Stewartstown.

In 2005, a new pavilion was built to replace the existing one, which was built in 1974. In 2011, a second floodlit pitch was officially opened by GAA President Christy Cooney. In 2022, a further phase of redevelopment got under way with the addition of a new playing field, turnstiles, fencing, play park and gym.

== Honours ==
- Tyrone Senior Football Championship (2):
  - 1924, 1962
- Tyrone Intermediate Football Championship (2):
  - 1980, 2006
- Tyrone Junior Football Championship (2):
  - 2004, 2022
- Ulster Junior Club Football Championship (2):
  - 2004, 2022
- Tyrone All-County League Division 1 (1):
  - 1971
- Tyrone All-County League Division 3 (3):
  - 1989, 2010, 2022
