= Newtownstewart St Eugene's GAC =

Tyrone-based Gaelic games club

Newtownstewart St Eugene's
- An Baile Nua Naoimh Eoghain
- Founded: 1945
- County: Tyrone
- Nickname: Newtown
- Colours: Green, Yellow & White
- Coordinates: 54°43′06.71″N 7°22′15.30″W

Playing kits
Standard	Reserve

Newtownstewart St Eugene's (Irish: An Baile Nua Naoimh Eoghain) was a Gaelic Athletic Association club. The club was based in Newtownstewart, County Tyrone, Northern Ireland.

The club concentrated on Gaelic football, with ladies Gaelic football also provided for.

In November 2019, Newtownstewart St Eugene's amalgamated with neighbouring club Dregish Pearse Óg's to form Naomh Eoghan GAC.

== Achievements ==
- Tyrone Junior Football Championship
  - 2018
