= Garvaghey =

Village in County Tyrone, Northern Ireland, UK

Coordinates: 54.489°N 7.135°W

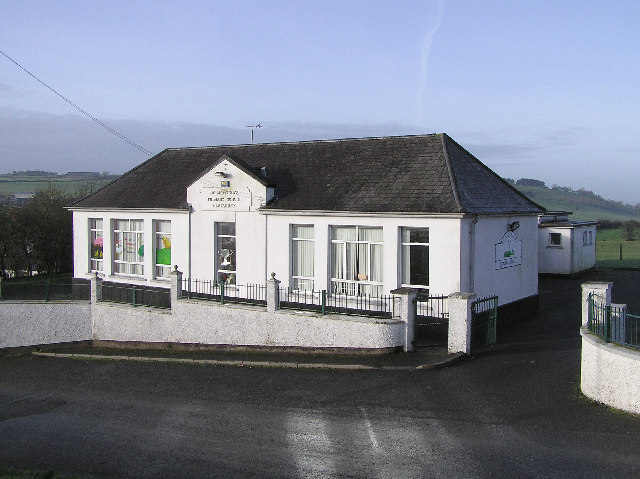
St. Matthew's Primary School, Garvaghy.

Garvaghey or Garvaghy (from Irish Garbhachadh, meaning 'rough field') is a townland and hamlet in County Tyrone, Northern Ireland.

It is between Ballygawley (about 5 miles to the southeast) and Omagh (about 11 miles to the northwest).

Garvaghey is in the Parish of Errigal Ciaran. The Garvaghey Centre is in Garvaghey in which the home county team (Tyrone) usually trains.

Poet John Montague (1929–2016) was raised in Garvaghey.
