= Tattyreagh St Patrick's GAC =

Tyrone-based Gaelic games club

Tattyreagh St Patrick's
- Naomh Pádraig, An Táite Riabhach
- Founded: 1917
- County: Tyrone
- Nickname: The Tatts
- Colours: Red and Black
- Grounds: Páirc Uí Dhorchaí
- Coordinates: 54°32′27.87″N 7°18′04.07″W

Playing kits
Standard colours

Tattyreagh St Patrick's is a GAA club based in the townland of Tattyreagh (from the Irish: An Táite Riabhach meaning the striped/tabby field), about halfway between Omagh and Fintona in County Tyrone, Northern Ireland.

== History ==
In January 1972, Tattyreagh St Patrick's joined with Tattysallagh St Eugene's to form Drumragh Sarsfields GAC. The amalgamation was formalised on 16 January 1972 after a meeting of representatives from both clubs. The new Drumragh club played its first competitive fixtures in Spring 1972. Over time, Tattyreagh again re-established itself as an independent club.

A training pitch was built with flood lights. A new stand was built in 2015 and named after a former club member of the club.

Tattyreagh won the 2017 Tyrone Junior Football Championship and proceeded to the Ulster Junior Club Football Championship as representative of County Tyrone. In 2018, Captain Conor Mullin, led Tattyreagh won the Tyrone Intermediate Championship. The Omagh Council hosted a reception for the club in February 2019.

== Honours ==
- Tyrone Intermediate Football Championship (1): 2018
- Tyrone Junior Football Championship (1): 2017
