= Beragh Red Knights GAA =

Tyrone-based Gaelic games club

Beragh Red Knights
- Bearach an Chraobh Rua
- Founded: 1906
- County: Tyrone
- Nickname: Red Knights
- Colours: Red with White/Gold
- Grounds: St Mary's Park, Beragh
- Coordinates: 54°32′58.20″N 7°09′04.96″W

Playing kits
Standard colours

Beragh Red Knights (Irish: An Bearach na Craoibhe Rua) is a Gaelic Athletic Association club. The club is based in Beragh, County Tyrone, Northern Ireland.

The club concentrates on Gaelic football, a Ladies Gaelic football club is also in existence as is a Handball club.

== Honours ==
- Tyrone Intermediate Football Championship: (2)
  - 1993, 2000
- Tyrone Junior Football Championship: (1)
  - 1988

== Notable players ==
- Frank Rodgers
