= Aghyaran St Davog's GAC =

Tyrone-based Gaelic games club

Aghyaran St Davog's
- Achadh Uí Aráin Naoimh Dabhóige
- Founded: 1956
- County: Tyrone
- Nickname: The Yarn / St. Davogs
- Colours: Green, Yellow & White
- Grounds: Michael Dolan Memorial Park
- Coordinates: 54°40′39.48″N 7°42′14.19″W

Playing kits
Senior	Reserve

Aghyaran St Davog's (Irish: Achadh Uí Aráin Naoimh Dabhóige) is a GAA club. It is based in the hamlet of Aghyaran near Castlederg, County Tyrone, Northern Ireland.

== History ==
Aghyaran St Davog's was founded in 1956. There was a previous club in the area between 1947 and 1948. A ladies' football club was established in 1993.

== Honours ==
- Tyrone Intermediate Football Championship: (2)
  - 1981, 1987
- Tyrone Senior Football League: (1)
  - 2000
- Tyrone Junior Football League: (1)
  - 1962

== Notable players ==
Ciaran McGarvey played full back on team that lost to Kerry in the 1986 All-Ireland final, marking star forward Eoin Liston. Shane Sweeney was the first player from Aghyaran to win a Senior County All-Ireland medal in 2005, along with former Aghyaran player Martin Penrose. Aghyaran currently have three players on the Tyrone team, Benny Gallen, Ronan McNamee and Ronan McHugh. Ronan McNamee played fullback on the team that won the 2016 Ulster Senior Football Championship.

Brendan Dolan was the first Aghyaran man to represent Tyrone at senior level. Brendan made his Tyrone Championship debut in 1970, and was ever present at midfield for Tyrone and Ulster Railway Cup squads, and got to show off his high fielding skills as Tyrone toured America '69. Brendan stood at 6 ft 4 inches tall, he won MacRory and Hogan Cup medals with St Columb's Derry in 1965 and was a member of the Tyrone Junior Team that won an All Ireland in 1968. He died after a tragic car accident that took his life, whilst he was driving to school in Strabane where he worked as a PE teacher, in January 1973.

Conor Bradley, who now plays top level Premier League football with Liverpool Football Club.
