= Kildress Wolfe Tones GAC =

Tyrone-based Gaelic games club

Kildress Wolfe Tones
- CLG Uilf Tóin Chill Dreasa
- Founded: 1952
- County: Tyrone
- Nickname: The wolfeTones
- Colours: Green, White and Gold
- Grounds: Tierney Park, Gortacladdy
- Coordinates: 54°38′23.43″N 6°55′28.49″W

Playing kits
Standard colours

Kildress Wolfe Tones are a Gaelic Athletic Association club from County Tyrone.

== History ==
The first record of a football match that can be found was played on a June Sunday in 1904 in Gortreagh when a game was arranged to coincide with the formation of a Gaelic football team there. P.T. Devlin told of his memories of that day in a letter to "The Dungannon Observer" dated 8 May 1954.

Kildress was named after Theobald Wolfe Tone. Kildress's team is green, white and orange, the badge bears the symbol of the Beaghmore Stone Circles, a major landmark in Kildress.

Kildress currently play in the Division 2 of the Tyrone All County League.

== Achievements ==
- Tyrone Intermediate Football Championship: (2)
  - 1971, 2011
- Tyrone Junior Football Championship: (3)
  - 1966, 1994, 2020

== Notable people ==
- Cathal Corey, former player and manager
- Gavin Devlin
- Johnny McGurk, former manager
- Tony Scullion, former manager at the club
