= Brackaville Owen Roes GFC =

Tyrone-based Gaelic games club

Brackaville Owen Roes
- Breac an Bhile Eoghain Rua
- Founded: 1938
- County: Tyrone
- Nickname: The Roes
- Colours: Red & White
- Grounds: Patrick O'Brien Park
- Coordinates: 54°33′02.17″N 6°42′52.79″W

Playing kits
Standard	Reserve

Brackaville Owen Roes (Irish: Breac an Bhile Eoghain Rua) is a Gaelic Athletic Association club. The club is based in Brackaville, near Coalisland in County Tyrone, Northern Ireland.

The club concentrates on Gaelic football, and the senior team in 2023 competes in Division 3 of the Tyrone All-County Football League and play in the Tyrone Junior Football Championship. In December 2012 the club became 2012 Tyrone Junior Football Champions after a 16-year gap.

== History ==
Brackaville Owen Roes was founded in the summer of 1938 by some local men who decided that the Brackaville area needed its own football team. Repeated attempts to form the new club were blocked by Coalisland Na Fianna GAC, however.

Matt Symington, one of the men trying to form the club cycled to Cookstown to convince the Tyrone County Board to register Brackaville Owen Roes GFC as a club and succeeded.

Jerseys were provided by Charlie Hughes and in the first few years of Brackaville Owen Roes being a club they were quite successful, winning the 1940 Tyrone Junior Football Championship and 1942 Tyrone Junior league title, during this time they were considered to be one of the best clubs in County Tyrone.

In 1947 and 1948 Brackaville had 3 players that played for the Tyrone minor team that won the All-Ireland Minor Football Championship, however in 1954 the club collapsed.

In 1959 the club was reformed by Seamus Duffin and Al Malloy. In 1965 Brackaville won the Junior League which got them into the intermediate ranks for the first time, that season they only lost twice, and won the league in a playoff. Brackaville found the tougher league more challenging but, in 1969 they won the Intermediate League too and advanced the club into Senior football for the first time.

During the 1970s the club's performances started to fall and they ended up back in the Junior League, it was during this time that Brackaville gained a home as before that they played only other club's pitches and different fields throughout the years. In the late 1970s due to a lack of players Brackaville joined with Stewartstown Harps to form the St Alban's team. In 1979 Brackaville won the Division 3 League Title after losing the Tyrone Junior Football Championship final, success also came in 1982 when Brackaville won the Under 14's League and won the Feis Cup that same year. The Reserve team also won the Division 2 title in 1983.

In 1992 the Brackaville Under 14's team won the County Title, in 1994 the Under 16's won the Grade 2 Championship, the same year the Minor team won the Grade 2 League Title and the team that won the Tyrone Oaks Board Competition, the same year in 1994 the Senior team got to the Junior League final but got beaten by Kildress and in 1995 the same team won the Micheal Duff Cup. In 1996 the senior team (under new management) won the Tyrone Junior Football Championship, and in 1998 the Minor team won the Grade 3 League.

In 1998 and 1999 the Under 14's were League Champions, also in 1999 Brackaville won their first Minor Championship. In 1999 Brackaville got their place in Senior Football by winning the Tyrone Intermediate Football Championship. In 2005 the Under 14's won the Under 14 League, the Brackaville Minor team also won the Championship a few months later, in 2006 the Under 14's yet again won 2 championships a grade 4 League, in 2007 the Under 16's won a Grade 2 Championship.

The club hasn’t been as successful in recent years however they did win the Tyrone Junior Football Championship in 2012 and 2015.

== Achievements ==
- Tyrone Junior Football League: (3) 1942, 1965, 1979
- Tyrone Intermediate Football League: (1) 1969
- Tyrone Intermediate Football Championship: (1) 1999
- Ulster Intermediate Club Football Championship: (1) 2000
- Tyrone Junior Football Championship: (4) 1940, 1996, 2012, 2015
