= Moy Tír Na nÓg GAC =

Tyrone-based Gaelic games club

Moy Tír na nÓg
- An Mhaigh Tír na nÓg
- Founded: 1908
- County: Tyrone
- Colours: Sky Blue & Navy
- Grounds: Magee Park
- Coordinates: 54°26′35.49″N 6°41′47.88″W

Playing kits
Standard

Senior Club Championships
	All Ireland	Ulster champions	Tyrone champions
Football:	-	-	1

Moy Tír na nÓg is a Gaelic Athletic Association club based in the Moy, a village in the south of County Tyrone, Northern Ireland. It fields teams at all age groups in Gaelic football and Ladies' Gaelic football, and is affiliated to Tyrone GAA. As of 2020, the club was playing football in the Senior Championship and in League Division 1. The Senior Ladies team plays in the Intermediate, Division 2 League in Tyrone.

== History ==
The club was founded as 'Moy Phelim Roe GAC' in 1908, within a year of the first recorded game of Gaelic football in the village. The Moy team took part in an East Tyrone league over the next three years, and resurfaced as Moy Tír na nÓg in 1913.

Tír na nÓg remained active thereafter, apart from 1970 when it amalgamated with the now-defunct Eoghan Ruadh GAC, Benburb, to form a Clonfeacle parish team.

The club acquired new playing field and clubrooms in 1998, and opened a new training pitch in 2008, to which floodlighting was added in 2010.

== Honours ==
- Tyrone Senior Football Championship (1): 1920
- Tyrone Intermediate Football Championship (2): 1982, 2017
- Ulster Intermediate Club Football Championship (1): 2017
- All-Ireland Intermediate Club Football Championship (1): 2018
- Tyrone Junior Football Championship (2): 1953, 1979

== Ladies' football ==
The club also fields teams in Ladies' Gaelic Football Association (LGFA) competitions. LGFA titles won include:

- Tyrone Ladies Junior Football Championship (1) 2020

== Notable players ==
The following Moy players have represented their county:

- Plunkett Donaghy
- Colin Holmes
- Philip Jordan
- Seán Cavanagh
- Colm Cavanagh
- Harry Loughran
