= Eglish St Patrick's GAC =

Tyrone-based Gaelic games club

Eglish St Patrick's
- An Eaglais Naomh Pádraig
- Founded: 1955
- County: Tyrone
- Nickname: Magpies
- Colours: Black with white sleeves Away jersey is white with black sleeves
- Grounds: Fr Connolly Park and Pairc Chormaic
- Coordinates: 54°27′06.11″N 6°47′54.99″W

Playing kits
Standard/ white shirts	Reserve

Senior Club Championships
	All Ireland	Ulster champions	Tyrone champions
Football:	-	-	1

Eglish St Patrick's is a Gaelic Athletic Association club based in the village of Eglish in County Tyrone, Northern Ireland.

== Grounds ==
Eglish's main playing field is Fr Connolly Park named after a former Parish priest which was opened in 1964 with the pitch being resurfaced in 1997 and 2014. The sports hall was opened in 1984 with new changing rooms and gym being built in 2001. The club's new football ground is named Pairc Chormaic after the late Eglish and Tyrone captain Cormac McAnallen which opened in 2012. Changing rooms were built in late 2016.

== Notable players ==
- Cormac McAnallen - All-Ireland winner 2003, All-Ireland Minor winning captain 1998 and Tyrone captain
- Conor McKenna - All-Ireland Minor Finalist 2013. Played Australian rules football for Essendon in Melbourne and then for Brisbane Lions Football Club in Brisbane.

== Honours ==
- Tyrone Senior Football Championship: (1)
  - 1970
- Tyrone Intermediate Football Championship: (2)
  - 1992, 1997
- Tyrone Junior Football Championship: (1)
  - 1973
- Tyrone All-County League Division 1: (1)
  - 1976
- Tyrone All-County League Division 2: (3)
  - 2007, 2010, 2022

- Tyrone Minor Football Championship Grade 1 1987, 1996 & 1997 Grade 2 2007 & 2015
- Tyrone Minor Football League Grade 1 1996 & 1997
- Tyrone Under-16 Football Championship Grade 2 2009, 2013 & 2017
- Tyrone Under-16 Football Championship Grade 3 2015
- Tyrone Under-16 Football League Grade 3 2015

== Camogie ==
Eglish camogie club were serial camogie champions of Tyrone and won Ulster camogie titles in Senior Club Camogie Champions in 1985, 1986. 1987 and 1991, the year they went on to contest the All-Ireland senior final against Mullagh. The Camogie club won their first Ulster title in 2015 since 1991 retaining the title in 2016. In 2016 Eglish reached the All Ireland Intermediate Final losing to Myshall, Carlow on a score line of 1-09 to 1-10.
