= Eskra Emmetts GAC =

Tyrone-based Gaelic games club

Eskra Emmetts
- An Eascair Cumann Eiméid
- Founded: 1929
- County: Tyrone
- Nickname: Skra
- Colours: White and black
- Grounds: Emmett Park
- Coordinates: 54°29′05.57″N 7°12′07.09″W

Playing kits
Standard colours

Eskra Emmetts is a Gaelic Athletic Association club based in the hamlet of Eskra in County Tyrone, Northern Ireland. It also takes in the Hamlet of Newtownsaville.

Eskra Emmetts won the Tyrone Intermediate Championship for the first time on 20 October 2013. In 2014 they played senior football for the first time in their history.

The club was founded in 1929 (GAA activities had taken place in the area since 1924), and participated intermittently until 1978 when it was reformed on a more stable basis. It has been a constant in the area since then.

== History ==
Eskra Emmetts won a Division 3 league in 1986 to gain promotion to Division 2. They were relegated the following year and remained in the lower tier of Tyrone football until 2004, and lost two junior championship finals during that period including the 1996 decider.

In 2003 the Emmetts won promotion from Division 3 by winning the Junior championship defeating Newtownstewart in the final. They had been beaten in the final the previous year by Urney. Following this they defeated Armagh champions Annaghmore in a preliminary round of the Ulster Junior championship before losing to Monaghan Harps in the next round.

In 2004 Eskra reached the intermediate decider, for a championship final appearance for the third year in a row. They were beaten by the future All-Ireland finalists Pomeroy.

For the next ten years Eskra managed to maintain their intermediate status.

In 2012 they again reached the championship decider where they lost to the eventual All-Ireland intermediate champions Cookstown after a replay.

In 2013 the Emmetts reached the intermediate championship final for a third time and their second in a row. They gained promotion to senior football for the first time in their history by beating Urney. They reached the Ulster Intermediate championship final where they lost to eventual All-Ireland intermediate champions Truagh.

At the end of the 2014 season Eskra were relegated from Division 1 to Division 2 after losing a playoff to Trillick St.Macartans. After the 2017 season Eskra were relegated to Division 3 after finishing bottom of Division 2. In 2018 Eskra finished joint top of the Division 3 league on 28 points (winning 14 out of 16 games) with Clogher but lost out on the league title due to the head-to-head result.

Eskra became senior and reserve Division 3 league champions in 2021 with both teams going unbeaten across the entire league campaign. The reserves having won 14 from 14 games and the seniors winning 13 games and 1 draw. This secured promotion back to Division 2 for Eskra.

== Achievements ==
- Tyrone Intermediate Football Championship: (1)
  - 2013
- Ulster Intermediate Club Football Championship: (runner-up) 2013
- Tyrone Junior Football Championship: (1)
  - 2003
- Tyrone All-County League Division 3: (2)
  - 1986, 2021
