= Killyman St Mary's GAC =

Tyrone-based Gaelic games club

Killyman St Mary's G.A.C
- Cill na mBán Naoimh Muire C.L.G
- Founded: 1964
- County: Tyrone
- Colours: Yellow and Blue
- Grounds: St Mary's Park
- Coordinates: 54°30′26″N 6°40′24″W

Playing kits
Seniors	Reserve

Killyman St Mary's is a Gaelic Athletic Association (GAA) club based in the parish of Dungannon in County Tyrone, Northern Ireland. While Gaelic games were played in the area from at least the early 20th century, the club was established in 1964.

== Honours ==
- Tyrone Intermediate Football Championship (2): 1973, 2007
- Tyrone Junior Football Championship (4): 1968, 1989, 2005, 2010
