= Glenelly St Joseph's GAC =

Tyrone-based Gaelic games club

Glenelly St Joseph's
- Gleann Eallaigh Naoimh Seosaimh
- Founded: 1981
- County: Tyrone
- Nickname: The Plum
- Colours: Sky blue & navy
- Grounds: Plumbridge
- Coordinates: 54°45′57.41″N 7°15′00.42″W

Playing kits
Standard	Reserve/Away

Glenelly St Joseph's (Irish: Gleann Eallaigh Naoimh Seosaimh) is a Gaelic Athletic Association club. The club is based in Plumbridge, County Tyrone, Northern Ireland and serves the parish of Badoney Upper, which includes the villages of Plumbridge and Cranagh. The club concentrates on Gaelic football, with ladies Gaelic football also provided for.

== See also ==
- Tyrone GAA
- List of Gaelic games clubs
