= Rock St Patrick's GAC =

Tyrone-based Gaelic games club

Rock St Patrick's
- An Charraig Naomh Pádraig
- Founded: 1916
- County: Tyrone
- Colours: Green, Black and White
- Grounds: Páirc Naomh Pádraig
- Coordinates: 54°35′56.56″N 6°49′51.09″W

Playing kits
Standard colours

Rock St Patrick's is a Gaelic Athletic Association club based near the village of Rock in County Tyrone, Northern Ireland.

The club fields teams at all levels in Gaelic football and participates in Scór and Scór na nÓg competitions.

The club's men's senior team compete in the Tyrone Intermediate Football Championship and the Tyrone ACFL Division 2. The ladies senior team compete in the Tyrone Junior League and Championship.

== History ==
- The club has won the Ulster Junior Club Football Championship on three occasions (2007, 2014 and 2016). The club were runners-up in the All-Ireland Junior Club Football Championship finals in Croke Park in 2008 and 2017.
- In 2016, the club celebrated its centenary year.

== Achievements ==
- Tyrone Intermediate Football Championship: (1)
  - 2026
- Tyrone Junior Football Championship: (5)
  - 1982, 2007, 2014, 2016, 2019
- Ulster Junior Club Football Championship: (3)
  - 2007, 2014, 2016
- Tyrone All-County League Division 2: (1)
  - 2002
- Tyrone All-County League Division 3: (3)
  - 1993, 2007, 2014

== Notable players ==
- In 2003, club player Ciaran Gourley was a member of the first Tyrone GAA team to win the All-Ireland Senior Football Championship, as well repeating this success in 2005 and 2008.
