= Gortin St Patrick's GAC =

Tyrone-based Gaelic games club

Gortin St Patrick's
- Naomh Pádraig, An Goirtín
- Founded: 1972
- County: Tyrone
- Colours: Blue and yellow
- Coordinates: 54°43′09.20″N 7°13′48.70″W

Playing kits
Standard colours

Gortin St Patrick's is a Gaelic Athletic Association club based in the village of Gortin in County Tyrone, Northern Ireland.

== Honours ==
- Tyrone Intermediate Football Championship: (2)
  - 1989, 2003
- Tyrone Junior Football Championship: (1)
  - 1961
- Tyrone Intermediate Football League: (1)
  - 2024
