= Drumragh Sarsfields GAC =

Tyrone-based Gaelic games club

Drumragh Sarsfields
- Droim Ratha Na Sarseíl
- Founded: 1972
- County: Tyrone
- Nickname: The Sarsfields
- Colours: White & Green
- Grounds: Clanabogan Park
- Coordinates: 54°34′12.47″N 7°21′41.66″W

Playing kits
Senior	Reserve

Drumragh Sarsfields is a Gaelic Athletic Association club based in the village of Clanabogan between Omagh and Dromore in County Tyrone, Northern Ireland. The club was founded in 1972 as a result of an amalgamation of Tattysallagh St. Eugenes and Tattyreagh St Patrick's GAC.

== History ==
Drumragh Sarsfields GAC was formed in 1972 after the amalgamation of Tattysallagh St Eugenes and Tattyreagh St Patricks at a time when neither club was particularly pleased with its performance. St Eugenes, founded in the late 1890s, was one of the oldest clubs locally and won the County Junior Championship in 1942.

As of the 21st century, the club has grown and new club rooms and two new pitches (one of which is floodlit) have been developed. As of 2025, Drumragh was fielding over 18 teams at all age categories with both male and female teams.

== Notable players ==
Former Tyrone Minor and Drumragh Sarsfields player Gareth Haughey became the first Omagh CBS captain to lift the Hogan Cup in April 2007. Club Minor and Under 21 player Aaron Montgomery was a member of the Tyrone GAA U17 team which won the Ulster League & Championship and inaugural All Ireland Championship in 2017.

Tyrone Ladies players and Drumragh club members Sinead McLaughlin and Neamh Woods have both won All-Stars.

== Honours ==
- Tyrone Junior Football Championship (2): 1987, 1999
