= Ulster Junior Club Football Championship =

Annual Gaelic football tournament

- Irish: Craobh Shóisir Peile Ulaidh na gClub
- Code: Gaelic football
- Founded: 2001; 25 years ago
- Region: Ulster, Ireland (GAA)
- Trophy: Paul Kerr Cup
- No. of teams: 9
- Title holders: Clogher (1st title)
- Most titles: Rock St Patrick's (3 titles)
- Sponsors: Allied Irish Banks (AIB)

The Ulster Junior Club Football Championship (known for sponsorship reasons as the AIB Ulster GAA Football Junior Club Championship, or as the Ulster Club JFC for short) is an annual Gaelic football competition organised by Ulster Gaelic Athletic Association (GAA). It is played between the Junior championship winners from each of the nine counties of Ulster. The competition has a straight knock-out format. It was first held in 2001 as an unofficial tournament, and has been organised by Ulster GAA since 2004. The winners are awarded the Paul Kerr Cup, named for a Cremartin Shamrocks (Monaghan) minor player who died in 2000, and donated by his family. The winners go on to represent Ulster in the All-Ireland Junior Club Football Championship.

Monaghan and Tyrone clubs have the most wins with eight each. Rock St Patrick's are the most successful club, having won the competition three times. The current champions are Clogher from Tyrone.

== List of finals ==
Key to the list
†	Winning team reached the final of the All-Ireland Junior Club Football Championship
‡	Winning team won the All-Ireland Junior Club Football Championship

List of Ulster Junior Club Football Championship finals
Year	Winners		Score	Runners-up		Venue	Ref
Year	County	Club	Score	County	Club	Venue	Ref
2001 (Note: Unofficial tournament.)	Cavan	Drumgoon ‡	1–13 – 0–10	Monaghan	Doohamlet	Shamrock Park, Cremartin	
2002	Monaghan	Corduff Gaels	1–08 – 0–08	Derry	Ballerin	Shamrock Park, Cremartin	
2003	Monaghan	Monaghan Harps	1–11 – 2–08	Derry	Limavady	Shamrock Park, Cremartin	
2003	Monaghan	Monaghan Harps	1–12 – 1–02 (R)	Derry	Limavady	Shamrock Park, Cremartin	
2004	Tyrone	Stewartstown Harps †	0–09 – 2–02	Monaghan	Cremartin	Casement Park, Belfast	
2005	Monaghan	Monaghan Harps	1–12 – 0–07	Armagh	Clonmore	Brewster Park, Enniskillen	
2006	Tyrone	Greencastle ‡	1–06 – 0–08	Donegal	Naomh Bríd	Casement Park, Belfast	
2007	Tyrone	Rock St Patrick's †	2–08 – 2–06	Monaghan	Aughnamullen	St Tiernach's Park, Clones	
2008	Monaghan	Drumhowan	5–10 – 0–05	Derry	Lissan	Brewster Park, Enniskillen	
2009	Monaghan	Emyvale	2–06 – 1–09	Antrim	St Teresa's	Páirc Esler, Newry	
2009	Monaghan	Emyvale	2–14 – 1–11 (R)	Antrim	St Teresa's	Páirc Esler, Newry	
2010	Cavan	Swanlinbar †	0–08 – 2–07 (Note: Swanlinbar lost the final, but were awarded the title after a successful objection.)	Monaghan	Corduff Gaels	Breffni Park, Cavan	
2011	Tyrone	Derrytresk †	2–05 – 0–10	Monaghan	Cremartin	Athletic Grounds, Armagh	
2012	Armagh	An Port Mór	2–09 – 0–11	Tyrone	Brackaville	Páirc Esler, Newry	
2013	Monaghan	Emyvale	1–06 – 0–06	Tyrone	Killeeshil	Athletic Grounds, Armagh	
2014	Tyrone	Rock St Patrick's	2–12 – 0–07	Donegal	Urris	Owenbeg, Dungiven	
2015	Monaghan	Rockcorry	3–10 – 0–09	Derry	Faughanvale	Athletic Grounds, Armagh	
2016	Tyrone	Rock St Patrick's †	1–12 – 0–14 (aet)	Monaghan	Blackhill	Páirc Esler, Newry	
2017	Donegal	Naomh Colmcille	1–09 – 0–06	Fermanagh	Belnaleck	Celtic Park, Derry	
2018	Donegal	Red Hughs	1–11 – 1–09	Derry	Limavady	Celtic Park, Derry	
2019	Monaghan	Blackhill	1–11 – 0–09	Donegal	Buncrana	Healy Park, Omagh	
2020	Competition cancelled due to COVID-19 pandemic						
2021	Cavan	Denn	3–08 – 0–10	Donegal	Na Dúnaibh	St Tiernach's Park, Clones	
2022	Tyrone	Stewartstown Harps †	1–12 – 0–15 (aet) (5–4 pen)	Cavan	Drumlane	St Tiernach's Park, Clones	
2023	Cavan	Arva ‡	0–13 – 0–06	Monaghan	Blackhill	Shamrock Park, Roslea	
2024	Donegal	Naomh Pádraig †	3–07 – 1–12	Derry	Craigbane	Celtic Park, Derry	
2025	Tyrone	Clogher †	1–12 – 0–14	Monaghan	Emyvale	Shamrock Park, Roslea	

== Performances ==
=== By county ===
Performances in the Ulster Junior Club Football Championship by county
County	Titles	Runners-up	Years won	Years runners-up
Monaghan	8	8	2002, 2003, 2005, 2008, 2009, 2013, 2015, 2019	2001, 2004, 2007, 2010, 2011, 2016, 2023, 2025
Tyrone	8	2	2004, 2006, 2007, 2011, 2014, 2016, 2022, 2025	2012, 2013
Cavan	4	1	2001, 2010, 2021, 2023	2022
Donegal	3	4	2017, 2018, 2024	2006, 2014, 2019, 2021
Armagh	1	1	2012	2005
Derry	0	6	—	2002, 2003, 2008, 2015, 2018, 2024
Antrim	0	1	—	2009
Fermanagh	0	1	—	2017

=== By club ===
Performances in the Ulster Junior Club Football Championship by club
Club	Titles	Runners-up	Years won	Years runners-up
Rock St Patrick's	3	0	2007, 2014, 2016	—
Emyvale	2	1	2009, 2013	2025
Monaghan Harps	2	0	2003, 2005	—
Stewartstown Harps	2	0	2004, 2022	—
Blackhill	1	2	2019	2016, 2023
Corduff Gaels	1	1	2002	2010
Drumgoon	1	0	2001	—
Greencastle	1	0	2006	—
Drumhowan	1	0	2008	—
Swanlinbar	1	0	2010	—
Derrytresk	1	0	2011	—
An Port Mór	1	0	2012	—
Rockcorry	1	0	2015	—
Naomh Colmcille	1	0	2017	—
Red Hughs	1	0	2018	—
Denn	1	0	2021	—
Arva	1	0	2023	—
Naomh Pádraig	1	0	2024	—
Clogher	1	0	2025	—
Limavady	0	2	—	2003, 2018
Cremartin	0	2	—	2004, 2011
Doohamlet	0	1	—	2001
Ballerin	0	1	—	2002
Clonmore	0	1	—	2005
Naomh Bríd	0	1	—	2006
Aughnamullen	0	1	—	2007
Lissan	0	1	—	2008
St Teresa's	0	1	—	2009
Brackaville	0	1	—	2012
Killeeshil	0	1	—	2013
Urris	0	1	—	2014
Faughanvale	0	1	—	2015
Belnaleck	0	1	—	2017
Buncrana	0	1	—	2019
Na Dúnaibh	0	1	—	2021
Drumlane	0	1	—	2022
Craigbane	0	1	—	2024

== See also ==
- Munster Junior Club Football Championship
- Leinster Junior Club Football Championship
- Connacht Junior Club Football Championship
