= Killeeshil St Mary's GAC =

Tyrone-based Gaelic games club

Killeeshil St Mary's
- Cill Íseal Naoimh Mhuire
- County: Tyrone
- Coordinates: 54°29′29.62″N 6°56′33.55″W

Playing kits
Standard colours

Killeeshil St Mary's is a Gaelic Athletic Association club based in the village of Killeeshil in County Tyrone, Northern Ireland.

== Notable players ==
- Kevin Hughes - former Tyrone inter-county senior footballer

== Achievements ==
- Tyrone Intermediate Football Championship: (1)
  - 1986
- Tyrone Junior Football Championship: (2)
  - 2013, 2024
- Ulster Junior Club Football Championship: (runner-up)
  - 2013
