= Derrylaughan Kevin Barrys GAC =

Tyrone-based Gaelic games club

Derrylaughan Kevin Barry's
- Doire Locháin Chaoimhín de Barra
- Founded: 1945
- County: Tyrone
- Colours: Green and White
- Grounds: Páirc Doire Locháin
- Coordinates: 54°32′10.23″N 6°36′35.81″W

Playing kits
Standard colours

Senior Club Championships
| | All Ireland | Ulster champions | Tyrone champions |
|---|---|---|---|
| Football: | 0 | 0 | 2 |

Derrylaughan Kevin Barrys is a Gaelic Athletic Association club based along the Washing Bay area east of the parish of Clonoe in County Tyrone, Northern Ireland.

== History ==
Previous clubs existed in 1903 (‘Rising Sons of Goff’), 1917–19 and 1923 (Aughamullan Erin’s Hope/Pearses and Kevin Barrys). Washingbay Shamrocks flourished in period 1929-36 and 1939–48; won junior league in 1929, Dr. Collins Cup in 1932, SFC in 1934 (finalists in 1931), JFC in 1942.

Today's club was formed in 1945, and named after Kevin Barry.

The club won the Junior Football Championship in 1949. They beat Dungannon in the final in a low scoring game 2-3 to 1-1.

Derrylaughan would become a permanent fixture in the senior ranks for the next 40 years winning two county titles. The late 1950s and 1960s were a golden era for the club reaching county finals in 1957, 1962, 1964, 1965 and 1966 before eventually claiming the O'Neill Cup in 1967 with victory over Carrickmore Saint Colmcille's. .

While that team wouldn't challenge for top honours again the club claimed the first Tyrone Minor championship title in 1977. This team would provide a large number of players for the 1981 team that would claim the O'Neill Cup once again defeating Carrickmore in the final. The club rounded off that year by also winning the county Under 21 title.

Having suffered relegation to Division 2 in the early 1990s, the club struggled to regain their place in senior football but did eventually make their way back up claiming the 2003 Division 2 league title. They won this title again in 2006 but with the league restructuring the stay in senior football was short-lived.

Derrylaughan regained their place in the top tier of Tyrone football, and completed the full set of championship titles when they beat Urney in the final of the 2010 Intermediate championship.

The club has worked to update its facilities through the years. New playing fields were opened in 1981 and dressing rooms in 1984. Redevelopment work in the late 1990s saw the clubhouse upgraded. A second pitch was opened in 2004.

Derrylaughan regained their senior status winning the 2010 Tyrone Intermediate Championship following victory over Urney.

The club returned to Senior football after winning the intermediate league in 2017.

== Honours ==
- Tyrone Senior Football Championship: (2)
  - 1967, 1981
- Tyrone Intermediate Football Championship: (2)
  - 2010, 2024
- Tyrone Junior Football Championship: (1)
  - 1949
