= Aghaloo O'Neills GAC =

Tyrone-based Gaelic games club

Aghaloo O'Neills
- Achadh Lú Uí Néill
- Founded: 1970
- County: Tyrone
- Colours: Red and Black
- Grounds: O'Neill Park
- Coordinates: 54°24′26.44″N 6°58′42.25″W

Playing kits
Standard colours

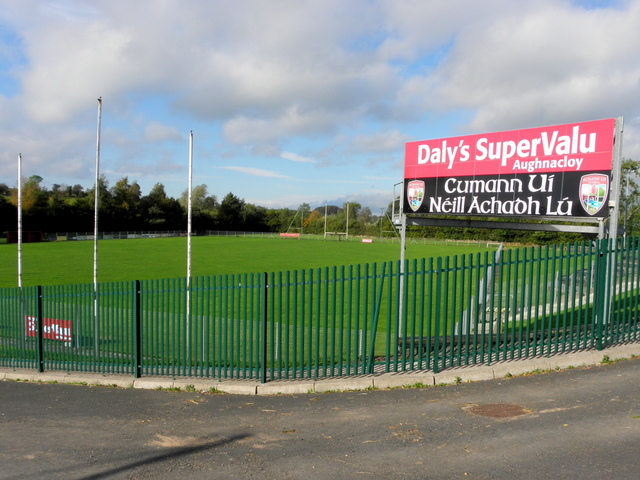
Club grounds in 2014

Aghaloo O'Neills (Irish: Achadh Lú Uí Néill) is a Gaelic Athletic Association club. The club is based in Aughnacloy and Caledon which encompasses the parish after which the club is named, Aghaloo, County Tyrone, Northern Ireland.

The club concentrates on Gaelic football. A Ladies Gaelic football club of the same name was also in existence during the 1990s.

== History ==
The senior team in 2009 won Division 3 of the Tyrone All-County Football League and were defeated in the final of the Tyrone Junior Football Championship by local rivals Augher St. Mac Cartans in 2008. In 2010 the club competed in Division 2 of the Tyrone All-County Football League and the Tyrone Intermediate Football Championship.

== Achievements ==
- Tyrone Intermediate Football Championship: (2)
  - 2002, 2005
- Tyrone Junior Football Championship: (2)
  - 1974, 1991

== Notable players ==
- Aidan McAnespie
