= Cookstown Fr. Rock's GAC =

Tyrone-based Gaelic games club

Cookstown Fr Rocks
- Founded: 1889
- County: Tyrone
- Nickname: The Rocks
- Colours: Navy & Blue
- Grounds: Paddy Cullen Park
- Coordinates: 54°38′32.77″N 6°45′02.25″W

Playing kits
Standard colours	Second colours

Cookstown Fr. Rock's Gaelic Athletic Club (Irish: CLG an tAth. Mac Con Carraige, An Chorra Chríochach) is a Gaelic Athletic Association club based in Cookstown in County Tyrone, Northern Ireland. The club fields male and female teams across a multitude of age groups ranging from Under 6s to senior level. Their home ground, Paddy Cullen Park, is located at 1 Convent Lane, Cookstown, just behind Holy Trinity Primary School and Holy Trinity College. In recent years Owen Mulligan and Raymond Mulgrew have both won All-Ireland Senior Football Championship medals with the Tyrone senior team. The club also had five players who won All-Ireland Minor Football Championship medals on the same day in 2004.

== Main sponsor ==
Cookstown Fr. Rock's are currently sponsored by the engineering firm Steelweld Fabrications who are based in Cookstown.

== History ==
In 1889 the first GAA club in Tyrone, Cookstown Owen Roe's, was established, just five years after the foundation of the Gaelic Athletic Association.

In 1889 the prevailing political climate was one in which association with the GAA was not something to be sought. Numerous files from Dublin castle can bear testimony to this fact. Despite this Fr John Rock, a curate in Cookstown, initiated efforts to form the Owen Roe's club, and they were soon to fulfil fixtures with teams from Armagh, Derry and Belfast. The magazine Sport reported a game between the Owen Roe's and Armagh Harps, played on St Patrick's Day, 1889. It is quite possible that this was the first competitive outing of a team from Tyrone.

In 1890 the membership of the club stood at 40 - all of whom were described by the RIC as 'AOH suspects'. The year however was to prove an historic one. On 12 October that year, Owen Roe's represented Tyrone in the Ulster senior football final, thus earning for the town another first, as they were the first Tyrone side to compete in a provincial final. By 1891 however, the club had all but disappeared as political tensions swept throughout Ireland.

In 1905 the Gaels of Cookstown regrouped and out of the vacuum emerged a new force in Gaelic football, known as the Brian Ógs. The new club played its first game against a team from Coalisland in what would prove to be controversial circumstances. Whilst travelling to the game, the club was attacked near Tullyhogue by a hostile crowd of about 300. Stones were thrown and a brake carrying Cookstown players was driven unto a fence injuring several players. The team eventually played the game in Coalisland where they spent the night and were only able to return after an urgent request to Dublin for police reinforcements, was answered when over 100 police escorted the Brian Ógs home the following day.

Despite such incidents the club continued to flourish and a minute book from the period 1907 to 1910, highlights the goings on at the fledgling club. The book still remains in the hands of the club and is the oldest first hand record of the early days of the GAA in Tyrone.

In 1907 the club went out of existence for a short period of time and this led to the emergence of a club called the Cookstown Emmetts. By November 1907 Brian Ógs were back in business and continued to carry the standard in Cookstown for the next 30 years, becoming the dominant force in Tyrone football along the way.

Within ten years of its formation the new club defeated Kilskerry McDonaghs by 3-1 to 2-1 to capture the senior championship. The following year they were in the final once more when they defeated Omagh after a replay. The Brian Ógs thus earned another first for the town by becoming the first side to win successive senior titles.

In the 1930s another club emerged in Cookstown called the Geraldines. For the next few years the clubs existed side by side, boasting teams from all age groups. In 1928 however the end of an era drew to a close as following a suggestion from a local curate, Fr Taggart, it was decided that the two clubs amalgamate and on 6 March 1938 Fr Rocks GFC was formed. In the first year in existence the club qualified for the Tyrone county final.

== Achievements ==
- Tyrone Senior Football Championship: (2)
  - 1916-17, 1917–18
- Tyrone Intermediate Football Championship: (4)
  - 1962, 1964, 2009, 2012
- Ulster Intermediate Club Football Championship: (2)
  - 2009, 2012
- All-Ireland Intermediate Club Football Championship: (2)
  - 2010, 2013
- Tyrone Junior Football Championship: (2)
  - 1978, 2021

== Notable players ==
- Owen Mulligan

Preceded by St Michael's/Foilmore	All-Ireland Intermediate Club Football Champions; 2010	Succeeded by -
