= 2026 Tyrone Senior Football Championship =

Gaelic football tournament

2026 Connollys of Moy Tyrone Senior Football Championship
Tournament details
- County: Tyrone
- Province: Ulster
- Level: Senior
- Year: 2026
- Trophy: O'Neill Cup
- Sponsor: Connollys Of Moy
- Date: 3 September 2026 – 23 October 2026
- Teams: 16
- Defending champions: Loughmacrory

Winners
- Champions: Edendork (1st win)
- Manager: Brian McGuckin
- Captain: Conor Mallon
- Qualify for: Ulster Club SFC

Runners-up
- Runners-up: Errigal Ciarán
- Manager: Enda McGinley
- Captain: Peter Harte

Other
- Top Scorer: Darren McCurry (1-29)

The 2026 Tyrone Senior Football Championship is the 121st edition of Tyrone GAA's premier Gaelic football tournament for senior clubs in County Tyrone, Ireland. The championship consists of 16 teams in a straight knock-out format. The draw for the competition was made on 14 May 2026, with reigning champions Loughmacrory beginning their title defence against Dungannon.

The winners of the Tyrone Senior Football Championship will progress onwards to play the Down Senior Football Champions, Clonduff in the preliminary-round of the 2026 Ulster Senior Club Football Championship.

The draw for the Quarter-Finals took place at Healy Park, Omagh on Sunday 6 September 2026, after the Errigal Ciaran v Killyclogher 1st Round game.

The draw for the Semi-Finals took place at Healy Park, Omagh on Monday 21 September 2026, after the Errigal Ciaran v Trillick Quarter-Final game.

== Team changes ==
The following teams have changed division since the 2025 championship season.

Promoted from 2025 Intermediate Division

- Clonoe O'Rahilly's (Intermediate Championship Winners and All-County League Division 2 Winners)
- Eglish St. Patrick's (All-County League Division 2 Runners-Up)
- Coalisland Fianna (All-County League Division 1/2 Playoff Winner)

Relegated to 2026 Intermediate Division

- Pomeroy Plunketts (All-County League Division 1/2 Playoff Loser)
- Gortin St. Patrick's (All-County League Division 1 Playoff Loser)
- Derrylaughan Kevin Barry's (16th in All-County League Division 1)

== Bracket ==
Round 1
Coalisland	1-15
Clonoe	2-23
Edendork	1-18
Ardboe	2-12
An Charraig Mhór	2-10
Dromore	0-14
Donaghmore	0-24
Eglish	1-10
Trillick	0-19
Galbally	3-9
Killyclogher	1-9
Errigal Ciarán	0-20
Omagh	0-21
Moortown	0-6
Loughmacrory	1-19 (0-19 R)
Dungannon	4-10 (1-8 R)

Quarter-finals
Clonoe	4-15
Edendork	3-25
An Charraig Mhór	0-17 (0-10 R)
Donaghmore	1-14 (2-20 R)
Trillick	0-12
Errigal Ciarán	1-16
Omagh	0-8
Loughmacrory	0-23

Semi-finals
Edendork	0-20
Donaghmore	0-12
Errigal Ciarán	0-19
Loughmacrory	1-13

Final
Edendork	1-12 (1-14 R)
Errigal Ciarán	0-15 (1-13 R)

- The above bracket may be adjusted during the championship due to the multiple draws that are made to determine each round's fixtures.

== Round 1 ==
3 September 2026 Round 1	Edendork	1-18 - 2-12	Ardboe	Dungannon
7:30PM				Stadium: O'Neill Park; Referee: Paul Gallagher (Castlederg)

4 September 2026 Round 1	An Charraig Mhór	2-10 - 0-14	Dromore	Omagh
7:30PM				Stadium: Healy Park; Referee: Shane Meehan (Glenelly)

5 September 2026 Round 1	Trillick	0-19 - 3-9	Galbally	Carrickmore
1:30PM				Stadium: Páirc Colmcille; Referee: Martin Conroy (Moy)

5 September 2026 Round 1	Omagh	0-21 - 0-6	Moortown	Pomeroy
3:45PM				Stadium: Plunkett Park; Referee: Stephen Campbell (Stewartstown)

5 September 2026 Round 1	Loughmacrory	1-19 - 4-10	Dungannon	Pomeroy
5:30PM				Stadium: Plunkett Park; Referee: Mark Loughran (Errigal Ciaran)

6 September 2026 Round 1	Coalisland	1-15 - 2-23	Clonoe	Edendork
1:45PM				Stadium: Páirc Arthur Mallon; Referee: Kieran Eannetta (Omagh)

6 September 2026 Round 1	Donaghmore	0-24 - 1-10	Eglish	Edendork
3:30PM				Stadium: Páirc Arthur Mallon; Referee: Michael Kelly (Urney)

6 September 2026 Round 1	Killyclogher	1-9 - 0-20	Errigal Ciarán	Omagh
7:15PM				Stadium: Healy Park; Referee: Cathal Forbes (Ardboe)

10 September 2026 Round 1 Replay	Loughmacrory	0-20 - 1-8	Dungannon	Omagh
7:30PM				Stadium: Healy Park

== Quarter-finals ==
18 September 2026 Quarter-final	Clonoe	4-15 - 3-25	Edendork	Dungannon
7:30PM				Stadium: O’Neill Park; Referee: Mark Loughran (Errigal Ciaran)

19 September 2026 Quarter-final	An Charraig Mhór	0-17 - 1-14	Donaghmore	Pomeroy
4:30PM				Stadium: Plunkett Park; Referee: Cathal Forbes (Ardboe)

20 September 2026 Quarter-final	Omagh	0-8 - 0-23	Loughmacrory	Carrickmore
1:30PM				Stadium: Páirc Colmcille; Referee: Martin Conroy (Moy)

21 September 2026 Quarter-final	Trillick	0-12 - 1-16	Errigal Ciarán	Omagh
7:30PM				Stadium: Healy Park; Referee: Paul Gallagher (Castlederg)

24 September 2026 Quarter-final Replay	An Charraig Mhór	0-10 - 2-20	Donaghmore	Dungannon
7:30PM				Stadium: O’Neill Park; Referee: Shane Meehan (Glenelly)

== Semi-finals ==
3 October 2026 Semi-final	Donaghmore	0-12 - 0-20	Edendork	Dungannon
7:15PM				Stadium: O’Neill Park; Referee: Kieran Eannetta (Omagh)

4 October 2026 Semi-final	Errigal Ciarán	0-19 - 1-13	Loughmacrory	Carrickmore
4:00PM				Stadium: Páirc Colmcille; Referee: Sean Hurson (Galbally)

== Final ==
18 October 2026 Final	Edendork	1-12 - 0-15	Errigal Ciarán	Omagh
4:30PM				Stadium: Healy Park; Referee: Paul Gallagher (Castlederg)

23 October 2026 Final Replay	Edendork	1-14 - 1-13	Errigal Ciarán	Omagh
7:35PM				Stadium: Healy Park; Referee: Cathal Forbes (Ardboe)
