= 2021 Tyrone Senior Football Championship =

2021 Tyrone SFC
Tournament details
- County: Tyrone
- Province: Ulster
- Level: Senior
- Year: 2021
- Sponsor: LCC Group
- Date: 3 October - 14 November 2021
- Teams: 18
- Defending champions: Dungannon

Winners
- Champions: Dromore (4th win)
- Manager: Colm McCullagh
- Captain: Conor O'Hara
- Qualify for: 2021 Ulster Club SFC

Runners-up
- Runners-up: Coalisland
- Manager: Brian McGuckin
- Captain: Pádraig Hampsey

Promotion/Relegation
- Relegated team(s): Eglish (15th in SFL); Galbally(16th in SFL); Pomeroy(17th in SFL); Edendork (18th in SFL)

The 2021 Tyrone Senior Football Championship was the 116th edition of Tyrone GAA's premier Gaelic football tournament for senior clubs in County Tyrone, Northern Ireland. The championship consisted of 18 teams and had a straight knock-out format. The winners receive the O'Neill Cup and represent Tyrone in the Ulster Senior Club Football Championship. The draw for the championship was made on 15 July 2021.

Dungannon Thomas Clarkes entered as defending champions, but Dromore St Dympna's ended their title defence in the first round.

Dromore went on to win the championship after disposing of Coalisland Fianna in the final.

== Team changes ==
The following teams have changed division since the 2020 championship season.

=== To Championship ===
Promoted from 2020 Intermediate Championship

- Edendork St Malachy's - (Intermediate Champions)
- Eglish St Patrick's - (IFL Runners-up)

=== From Championship ===
Relegated to 2020 Intermediate Championship

No relegation

== Preliminary round ==
3 October 2021 Preliminary Round	Ardboe	0-10 – 0-12	Dromore	Pomeroy
15:00				Stadium: Plunkett Park

3 October 2021 Preliminary Round	Derrylaughan	1-10 – 0-11	Moy	Dungannon
18:30				Stadium: Eoghan Ruadh Hurling Club

== Round 1 ==
7 October 2021 Round 1	Killyclogher	1-10 – 1-9	Donaghmore	Omagh
19:30				Stadium: Healy Park

8 October 2021 Round 1	Pomeroy	1-11 – 2-15	Eglish	Omagh
18:45				Stadium: Healy Park

8 October 2021 Round 1	Trillick	3-7 – 1-8	Galbally	Omagh
20:30				Stadium: Healy Park

9 October 2021 Round 1	Omagh	1-14 – 3-12	Carrickmore	Loughmacrory
13:00				Stadium: Páirc an Locha

9 October 2021 Round 1	Edendork	3-10 – 4-9	Coalisland	Galbally
15:30				Stadium: Pearse Park

10 October 2021 Round 1	Derrylaughan	1-5 – 0-12	Loughmacrory	Edendork
13:00				Stadium: Páirc Arthur Mallon

10 October 2021 Round 1	Clonoe	0-10 – 1-21	Errigal Ciarán	Edendork
15:00				Stadium: Páirc Arthur Mallon

11 October 2021 Round 1	Dromore	2-22 – 4-12 (a.e.t.)	Dungannon	Omagh
19:30				Stadium: Healy Park

== Quarter-finals ==
22 October 2021 Quarter-final	Killyclogher	1-6 – 3-14	Trillick	Omagh
20:30				Stadium: Healy Park

23 October 2021 Quarter-final	Errigal Ciarán	2-9 – 0-7	Loughmacrory	Carrickmore
15:45				Stadium: Páirc Colmcille

24 October 2021 Quarter-final	Dromore	0-14 – 1-9	Eglish	Pomeroy
13:00				Stadium: Plunkett Park

24 October 2021 Quarter-final	Coalisland	0-10 – 0-9	Carrickmore	Galbally
15:30				Stadium: Pearse Park

== Semi-finals ==
30 October 2021 Semi-final	Dromore	0-17 – 2-9	Trillick	Omagh
19:15				Stadium: Healy Park

31 October 2021 Semi-final	Errigal Ciarán	0-14 – 3-6	Coalisland	Pomeroy
14:45				Stadium: Plunkett Park

== Final ==
14 November 2021
17:30
Final

Dromore	0-15 – 0-8	Coalisland
Emmet McNabb 0-6 (0-4f), Odhran Rafferty 0-3, Sean McNabb 0-2, Niall Sludden 0-1, Ryan McCusker 0-1, Tommy McCarron 0-1, Cahir Goodwin 0-1	Report	Paddy McNeice 0-4, Niall Devlin 0-1, Tiarnan Quinn 0-1, Plunkett Kane 0-1, Cathaoir Quinn 0-1

Healy Park, Omagh
Referee: Kieran Eannetta
