= 2023 Tyrone Senior Football Championship =

Gaelic football tournament

2023 Connolly's of Moy Tyrone Senior Football Championship
Tournament details
- County: Tyrone
- Province: Ulster
- Level: Senior
- Year: 2023
- Trophy: O'Neill Cup
- Sponsor: Connolly's Of Moy
- Date: 21 September – 31 October 2023
- Teams: 16
- Defending champions: Errigal Ciarán

Winners
- Champions: Trillick (9th win)
- Manager: Jody Gormley
- Captain: Rory Brennan
- Qualify for: Ulster Club SFC

Runners-up
- Runners-up: Errigal Ciarán
- Manager: Adrian O'Donnell; Mark Harte
- Captain: Tommy Canavan

The 2023 Tyrone Senior Football Championship was the 118th edition of Tyrone GAA's premier Gaelic football tournament for senior clubs in County Tyrone, Northern Ireland. The championship consisted of 16 teams in a straight knock-out format. The draw for the 118th edition was made on 26 April 2023. This year also brought a new championship sponsor in Connolly's of Moy on a three-year deal.

Errigal Ciarán were the defending champions, and reached the final for the second consecutive year. Trillick won the championship after an extra-time win over Errigal Ciarán in the final.

== Team changes ==
The following teams have changed division since the 2022 championship season.

Promoted from 2022 Intermediate Championship

- Galbally Pearses (Intermediate Champions)
- Eglish St Patrick's (Division 2 Champions)
- Edendork St Malachy's (Play-off winners)

Relegated to 2023 Intermediate Championship

- Clonoe (Play-off loser)
- Moy (Play-off loser)
- Derrylaughan (16th in SFL)

== Bracket ==
Round 1
Edendork	0–14
Carrickmore	1–4
Loughmacrory	0–13 (3 P)
Trillick	0–13 (4 P)
Eglish	0–4
Dungannon	1–10
Galbally	2–3
Dromore	1–8
Moortown	2–8
Donaghmore	1–10
Errigal Ciarán	0–17
Killyclogher	0–9
Omagh	1–6
Ardboe	1–8
Greencastle	0–7
Coalisland	2–11

Quarter-finals
Edendork	1–10
Trillick	0–14
Dungannon	2–12
Dromore	3–8
Moortown	0–6
Errigal Ciarán	2–8
Ardboe	1–14
Coalisland	0–11

Semi-finals
Trillick	2–11
Dungannon	1–9
Errigal Ciarán	2–19
Ardboe	0–7

Final
Trillick	1–13
Errigal Ciarán	0–13

== Round 1 ==
21 September 2023 Round 1	Errigal Ciarán	0–17 – 0–9	Killyclogher	Omagh
		Report		Stadium: O'Neills Healy Park

22 September 2023 Round 1	Moortown	2–8 – 1–10	Donaghmore	Dungannon
		Report		Stadium: Eoghan Ruadh Hurling Club

22 September 2023 Round 1	Loughmacrory	0–13 – 0–13 (a.e.t.) (3–4 p)	Trillick	Omagh
		Report		Stadium: O'Neills Healy Park

23 September 2023 Round 1	Omagh	1–6 – 1–8	Ardboe	Galbally
				Stadium: Pearse Park

23 September 2023 Round 1	Greencastle	0–7 – 2–11	Coalisland	Pomeroy
				Stadium: Plunkett Park

23 September 2023 Round 1	Edendork	0–14 – 1–4	Carrickmore	Pomeroy
				Stadium: Plunkett Park

24 September 2023 Round 1	Eglish	0–4 – 1–10	Dungannon	Edendork
				Stadium: Páirc Arthur Mallon

24 September 2023 Round 1	Galbally	2–3 – 1–8	Dromore	Carrickmore
		Report		Stadium: Páirc Colmcille

== Quarter-finals ==
31 September 2023 Quarter-final	Moortown	0–6 – 2–8	Errigal Ciarán	Loughmacrory
				Stadium: Páirc an Locha

31 September 2023 Quarter-final	Edendork	1–10 – 0–14	Trillick	Carrickmore
		Report		Stadium: Páirc Colmcille

1 October 2023 Quarter-final	Ardboe	1–14 – 0–11	Coalisland	Pomeroy
				Stadium: Plunkett Park

1 October 2023 Quarter-final	Dungannon	2–12 – 3–8	Dromore	Dunmoyle
		Report		Stadium: Cardinal MacRory Park

== Semi-finals ==
13 October 2023 Semi-final	Trillick	2–11 – 1–9	Dungannon	Omagh
		Report		Stadium: O'Neills Healy Park

14 October 2023 Semi-final	Errigal Ciarán	2–19 – 0–7	Ardboe	Carrickmore
		Report		Stadium: Páirc Colmcille

== Final ==
31 October 2023 Final	Trillick	1–13 – 0–13 (a.e.t.)	Errigal Ciarán	Omagh
	Ciaran Daly 1–2, Richie Donnelly 0–3, James Garrity 0–3, Lee Brennan 0–2 (0–2f), Seanie O'Donnell 0–2, Ryan Gray 0–1	Report	Darragh Canavan 0–2, Mark Kavanagh 0–2, Peter Harte 0–2, Cormac Quinn 0–2, Tommy Canavan 0–1 (0–1f), Ruairí Canavan 0–1 (0–1f), Ciaran Quinn 0–1, Odhran Robinson 0–1, Joe Oguz 0–1	Stadium: O'Neills Healy Park; Referee: Kieran Eannetta
