= 2017 Tyrone Senior Football Championship =

Tyrone SFC
- Season: 2017
- Champions: Omagh St. Enda's (8th Title)
- Relegated: Greencastle St. Patrick's (16th in S.F.L.); Strabane Sigersons (S.F.L. Relegation Playoff Loser); Urney St. Columba's (S.F.L./I.F.L. Relegation/Promotion Playoff Loser)
- Winning Captain: Joe McMahon
- Man Of The Match: ???
- Winning Manager: Paddy Crozier

The 2017 Tyrone Senior Football Championship is the 112th edition of Tyrone GAA's premier gaelic football tournament for clubs in Tyrone Senior Football League Division 1. Sixteen teams compete with the winners receiving the O'Neill Cup and representing Tyrone in the Ulster Senior Club Football Championship.

Killyclogher were the defending champions after they defeated Coalisland after a replay in the 2016 final. However the defence of their title came undone at the first hurdle when losing to newly promoted Pomeroy Plunkett's in Round 1.

Pomeroy Plunkett's, Urney St. Columba's and Donaghmore St. Patrick's returned to senior championship football in 2017.

This year marked the first time a Tyrone championship game was played outside the county. Omagh St. Enda's defeated Ardboe O'Donovan Rossa in a first round re-fixture tie in the Athletic Grounds, Armagh. Healy Park was ruled out due to Omagh's involvement and no neutral floodlit venue was available.

Greencastle St. Patrick's made the drop back down to the Intermediate ranks when finishing bottom of the 2017 S.F.L. They were followed by Strabane Sigersons who lost their S.F.L. Relegation Playoff to Urney St. Columba's, who in turn then lost their SFL/IFL promotion/relegation playoff to Aghyaran St. Davog's. I.F.C. champions Moy Tír na nÓg and I.F.L. champions Derrylaughan Kevin Barry's will also replace these relegated teams in 2018.

On 15 October 2017, Omagh St. Enda's claimed their 9th S.F.C. crown and first in three years when defeating Errigal Ciarán by 0-10 to 0-8 at Healy Park.

== Format ==
The championship has a straight knock out structure. The 16 teams that take part in the championship are the 16 teams in the Senior Football League (SFL).

Relegation from SFC:

Either two or three teams are relegated each year from the SFC and SFL. The 16th placed team in the SFL is automatically relegated to the IFL. The 15th and 14th placed teams then play a SFL relegation playoff with the loser being relegated. The winner plays the winner of the IFL promotion playoffs - if they win, they remain in the SFC and SFL - if they lose they are relegated to the IFC and IFL. (The winner of the SFC can't be relegated. If the championship winner finishes in the bottom 3 in the league, the 13th placed team enters the relegation scenario.)

Promotion to SFC:

Either two or three teams are promoted to the SFC each year. The IFC champions and the IFL champions are automatically promoted to the senior grade (If a team wins the IFC and IFL, the 2nd placed team in the IFL are automatically promoted). 2nd, 3rd, 4th and 5th place in the IFL enter the IFL promotion semi-finals (If the IFC champions are placed in the top 5 the 6th placed team enter the IFL promotion semi-finals) with the eventual winner of the final earning the right to play the loser of the SFL relegation playoff in a relegation/promotion playoff.

== Team changes ==
The following teams have changed division since the 2016 championship season.

=== To S.F.C. ===
Promoted from 2016 Tyrone I.F.C.

- Pomeroy Plunkett's - (IFC Champions)
- Urney St. Columba's - (SFL/IFL promotion/relegation playoff Winner)
- Donaghmore St. Patrick's - (IFL Champions)

=== From S.F.C. ===
Relegated to 2017 I.F.C.

- Eglish St. Patrick's - (SFL/IFL promotion/relegation playoff Loser)
- Augher St. Macartan's - (SFL Relegation Loser)
- Kildress Wolfe Tones- (16th in SFL)

== First round ==
8 September 2017; 8:30 pm First round	Trillick	3-17 - 0-6	Strabane	Healy Park; Referee: Martin Conroy (Moy); Man of the Match: James Garrity
8 September 2017; 8:30 pm First round	Lee Brennan 0-8 (0-6f), James Garrity 2-1, Rory Brennan 1-0, Ryan Gray, Mattie Donnelly, Daire Gallagher 0-2 each, Niall Donnelly and Richard Donnelly 0-1 each	av	Warner Mullen 0-4f, Ruairi Gormley and Michael Etherson 0-1 each	Healy Park; Referee: Martin Conroy (Moy); Man of the Match: James Garrity

9 September 2017; 2:00 pm First round	Coalisland	3-11 - 1-11	Galbally	Edendork; Referee: Martin Sludden (Dromore); Man of the Match: Peter Heron
9 September 2017; 2:00 pm First round	Stephen McNally 2-1, Paddy McNiece 1-4 (0-2f), Dermot Thornton 0-4 (0-2f), Plunkett Kane and Cathaoir Quinn 0-1 each		Sean Murphy 1-2 (0-2f), Conor Donnelly and Damian McCrory 0-2 each, Conor Quinn, Paul Rafferty, Mark Donnelly, Ronan Nugent, Conor Donaghy 0-1 each	Edendork; Referee: Martin Sludden (Dromore); Man of the Match: Peter Heron

9 September 2017; 5:30 pm First round	Killyclogher	0-7 - 1-9	Pomeroy	Errigal Ciaran; Referee: Stephen Campbell (Stewartstown)
9 September 2017; 5:30 pm First round	Simon O'Neill 0-3 (0-1f), Mark Bradley 0-2 (0-1f), James Carlin and Fergal Meenagh 0-1 each		John Loughran 1-3, Frank Burns 0-3 (0-1f), Aidan Woods 0-2, Kieran McGeary 0-1	Errigal Ciaran; Referee: Stephen Campbell (Stewartstown)

10 September 2017; 6:00 pm First round	Clonoe	1-10 - 0-12	Dromore	Carrickmore
10 September 2017; 6:00 pm First round	Declan McClure 0-7 (0-6f), Patrick Doris 1-0, Dwayne Quinn 0-2, Dan McNulty 0-1f	av	Ruairi Sludden 0-4 (0-2f), Emmet McNabb 0-3f, Ronan McNabb 0-2, Cathal McCarron, Sean McNabb, Eoin McCusker 0-1 each	Carrickmore

15 September 2017; 8:30 pm First round	Donaghmore	1-7 - 0-14	Greencastle	Healy Park; Referee: Kevin Bogle (Urney); Man of the Match: Christopher Gillen
15 September 2017; 8:30 pm First round	Niall McKenna 1-1, Cormac McCann and Tiarnan Drayne 0-2 each, Daniel Toner and Deasun Quinn 0-1 each		Mark Carson 0-7 (0-4f), Cahir McCullagh 0-3 (0-2f), Peter Teague 0-2, Sean Fox and Gavin Slane 0-1 each	Healy Park; Referee: Kevin Bogle (Urney); Man of the Match: Christopher Gillen

16 September 2017; 1:30 pm First round	Carrickmore	1-10 - 1-8	Edendork	Pomeroy; Referee: Brian McCallion (Castlederg); Man of the Match: Conan McElduff
16 September 2017; 1:30 pm First round	Barry Daly 0-5 (0-1f), Martin Penrose 1-1, Conan McElduff 0-2, Brendan McLaughlin and Michael Donaghy 0-1 each		Niall Morgan 1-3 (1 '45), Paul Donaghy 0-3, Darren McCurry (0-1f) and Harry Og Conlon 0-1 each	Pomeroy; Referee: Brian McCallion (Castlederg); Man of the Match: Conan McElduff

16 September 2017; 4:30 pm First round	Errigal Ciarán	2-11 - 0-7	Urney	Loughmacrory; Referee: Shane Dorrity (Coalisland); Man of the Match: Fergal McNulty
16 September 2017; 4:30 pm First round	Davy Harte 1-3 (0-2f), Peter Harte 0-5 (0-3f, 2 '45), Peter Og McCartan 1-0, Pauric McAnenly 0-2, Mark Kavanagh 0-1		Fergal McNulty 0-3, Marty Owens, Chris Bogle, Plunkett Langan (0-1f), Stephen Lafferty 0-1 each	Loughmacrory; Referee: Shane Dorrity (Coalisland); Man of the Match: Fergal McNulty

21 September 2017; 8:15 pm First round	Omagh	1-16 - 1-11	Ardboe	Athletic Grounds, Armagh; Referee: Eamon McHugh (Aghyaran); Man of the Match: Connor O'Donnell
21 September 2017; 8:15 pm First round	Connor O'Donnell 0-7 (0-2f), Conan Grugan 1-3 (0-1f), Hugh Gallagher, Joe McMahon (1 '45), Conor Clarke, Michael Gallagher, Ronan O'Neill, Cormac O'Neill, 0-1 each		Shay McGuigan (0-1f) and Michael O'Neill 0-3 each, Anthony Devlin 1-0, Michael Cassidy, Mattie Bell, David Mulgrew, Kyle Coney (0-1f), Caolan Mallaghan 0-1 each	Athletic Grounds, Armagh; Referee: Eamon McHugh (Aghyaran); Man of the Match: Connor O'Donnell

== Quarter-finals ==
22 September 2017; 8:30 pm Quarter-Final	Trillick	0-13 - 1-10	Coalisland	Omagh; Referee: Fergal Ward (Errigal Ciaran); Man of the Match: Stephen McNally
22 September 2017; 8:30 pm Quarter-Final	Lee Brennan 0-6 (0-5f), Niall Gormley 0-3, Ryan Gray 0-2, Daniel McDonnell and Gavin McCarron 0-1 each	av	Paddy McNiece 1-0, Peter Herron 0-3, Stephen McNally, Dermot Thornton, Cormac O'Hagan (0-2f) 0-2 each, Cathaoir Quinn 0-1	Omagh; Referee: Fergal Ward (Errigal Ciaran); Man of the Match: Stephen McNally

23 September 2017; 5:30 pm Quarter-Final	Clonoe	0-13 - 0-13	Pomeroy	Edendork; Referee: Kieran Eannetta (Omagh); Man of the Match: Ciaran McKenna
23 September 2017; 5:30 pm Quarter-Final	Declan McClure (0-3f) and Daniel McNulty (1 '45) 0-3 each, PJ Lavery and Colm Doris 0-2 each, Dwayne Quinn, Paul Coney, Conor McLaughlin 0-1 each	av	Frank Burns 0-3 (0-1f), Brendan Burns, John Loughran, Jude Campbell 0-2 each, Aidan Woods, Ryan Loughran, Kevin Armstrong, Ollie McCreesh 0-1 each	Edendork; Referee: Kieran Eannetta (Omagh); Man of the Match: Ciaran McKenna

24 September 2017; 2:30 pm Quarter-Final	Omagh	1-16 – 0-7	Greencastle	Killyclogher; Referee: Shane Dorrity (Coalisland); Man of the Match: Conor Meyler
24 September 2017; 2:30 pm Quarter-Final	Conor O'Donnell 0-5 (0-1f), Barry Tierney 1-1, Conan Grugan 0-3 (0-1f), Joe McMahon (1 '45) and Ronan O'Neill 0-2, Ciaran McLaughlin, Conor Meyler, Jason McAnulla 0-1 each	av	Mark Carson 0-4 (0-2f, 1 '45), Cahir McCullagh (0-1f), Christopher Gillen, Sean Fox 0-1 each	Killyclogher; Referee: Shane Dorrity (Coalisland); Man of the Match: Conor Meyler

24 September 2017; 5:30 pm Quarter-Final	Errigal Ciarán	0-11 - 0-8	Carrickmore	Pomeroy; Referee: Martin Sludden (Dromore); Man of the Match: Mark Kavanagh
24 September 2017; 5:30 pm Quarter-Final	Mark Kavanagh 0-4, Padraig McGirr 0-2, Cathal McRory, Ben McDonnell, Davy Harte (0-1f), Peter Og McCartan, Thomas Canavan 0-1 each	av	Martin Penrose 0-4f, Conor Gormley 0-2, Paul McAleer and Ruairi Loughran 0-1 each	Pomeroy; Referee: Martin Sludden (Dromore); Man of the Match: Mark Kavanagh

25 September 2017; 8:00 pm Quarter-Final Replay	Trillick	1-12 - 0-12	Coalisland	Omagh
25 September 2017; 8:00 pm Quarter-Final Replay		av av		Omagh

26 September 2017; 8:00 pm Quarter-Final Replay	Pomeroy	2-10 - 1-11	Clonoe	Athletic Grounds

== Semi-finals ==
30 September 2017
5:00 pm
Semi-Final

Omagh	1-11 - 1-10	Trillick
	av

Pomeroy
1 October 2017
5:00 pm
Semi-Final

Errigal Ciarán	1-12 - 0-11	Pomeroy
	av

Carrickmore

== Final ==
15 October 2017; 4:00 pm Final	Omagh	0-10 - 0-8	Errigal Ciarán	Healy Park, Omagh; Attendance: 7,375; Referee: Shane Dorrity (Coalisland); Man of the Match: Conan Grugan
15 October 2017; 4:00 pm Final	Conan Grugan (0-1f), Ronan O’Neill (0-2f), Connor O’Donnell (0-1f) 0-3 each, Joe McMahon 0-1	Report av av	Peter Harte 0-5 (0-3f), Peter Og McCartan, Darren Canavan, Ryan Lynch (0-1f) 0-1 each	Healy Park, Omagh; Attendance: 7,375; Referee: Shane Dorrity (Coalisland); Man of the Match: Conan Grugan
