= 2024 Tyrone Senior Football Championship =

Gaelic football tournament

2024 Connolly's of Moy Tyrone Senior Football Championship
Tournament details
- County: Tyrone
- Province: Ulster
- Level: Senior
- Year: 2024
- Trophy: O'Neill Cup
- Sponsor: Connolly's Of Moy
- Date: 5 September – 25 October 2024
- Teams: 16
- Defending champions: Trillick

Winners
- Champions: Errigal Ciarán
- Manager: Enda McGinley
- Captain: Darragh Canavan
- Qualify for: Ulster Club SFC

Runners-up
- Runners-up: Trillick
- Manager: Jody Gormley
- Captain: Richie Donnelly

The 2024 Tyrone Senior Football Championship is the 119th edition of Tyrone GAA's premier Gaelic football tournament for senior clubs in County Tyrone, Ireland. The championship consists of 16 teams in a straight knock-out format. The draw for the 119th edition was made on 12 June 2024.

Errigal Ciarán won the title after defeating Trillick on a score of 0-12 1-8.

== Team changes ==
The following teams have changed division since the 2023 championship season.

Promoted from 2023 Intermediate Championship

- Pomeroy Plunketts (Intermediate Championship Winners)
- Clonoe O'Rahilly's (All-County League Division 2 Winners)

Relegated to 2024 Intermediate Championship

- Moortown St. Malachy's (All-County League Division 1 Playoff Loser)
- Greencastle St. Patrick's (16th in All-County League Division 1)

== Bracket ==
Round 1
Omagh	0–13
Killyclogher	2-8
Carrickmore	0–11
Dromore	0–10
Errigal Ciaran	0-13
Pomeroy	2-4
Coalisland	1-8
Clonoe	0-12
Trillick	1-17
Eglish	1–9
Ardboe	1-12
Edendork	0-10
Loughmacrory	2-15
Galbally	2-7
Dungannon	2-9
Donaghmore	1-9

Quarter-finals
Killyclogher	2-9 (0-8 R)
Carrickmore	1-12 (0-6 R)
Errigal Ciaran	2–9 (0-14 R)
Clonoe	2-9 (0-11 R)
Trillick	1-8
Ardboe	0-9
Loughmacrory	2-9
Dungannon	1-13

Semi-finals
Killyclogher	2–8
Errigal Ciaran	1–12
Trillick	0-17
Dungannon	0–7

Final
Errigal Ciaran	0-12
Trillick	1-8

== Round 1 ==
5 September 2024 Round 1	Ardboe	1-12 - 0-10	Edendork	Dungannon
				Stadium: O’Neill Park

6 September 2024 Round 1	Carrickmore	0-11 - 0-10	Dromore	Omagh
				Stadium: O’Neills Healy Park

7 September 2024 Round 1	Trillick	1-17 - 1-9	Eglish	Galbally
				Stadium: Pearse Park

7 September 2024 Round 1	Errigal Ciaran	0-13 - 2-4	Pomeroy	Loughmacrory
				Stadium: Páirc an Locha

8 September 2024 Round 1	Omagh	0-13 - 2-8	Killyclogher	Carrickmore
				Stadium: Páirc Colmcille

8 September 2024 Round 1	Loughmacrory	2-15 - 2-7	Galbally	Omagh
				Stadium: O’Neills Healy Park

8 September 2024 Round 1	Dungannon	2-9 - 1-9	Donaghmore	Pomeroy
				Stadium: Plunkett Park

9 September 2024 Round 1	Coalisland	1-8 - 0-12	Clonoe	Dungannon
				Stadium: O’Neill Park
