= 2020 Tyrone Senior Football Championship =

Tyrone SFC
- Season: 2020
- Champions: Dungannon Thomas Clarkes (11th Title)
- Relegated: None
- Winning Captain: ???
- Man Of The Match: ???
- Winning Manager: ???
- Ulster SCFC: None

The 2020 Tyrone Senior Football Championship is the 115th edition of Tyrone GAA's premier gaelic football tournament for clubs in Tyrone Senior Football League Division 1. 16 teams compete with the winners receiving the O'Neill Cup and representing Tyrone in the Ulster Senior Club Football Championship.

Trillick St. Macartan's were the defending champions after they defeated Errigal Ciarán in the 2019 final. However the defence of their title came undone at the ??? stage when losing to ???.

Galbally Pearses, Pomeroy Plunkett's and Loughmacrory St. Teresa's returned to senior championship football in 2020.

??? made the straight drop back down to the Intermediate ranks when finishing bottom of the 2020 S.F.L. They were followed by ??? who lost their S.F.L. Relegation Playoff to ???, who in turn were then relegated after losing their SFL/IFL promotion/relegation playoff to ???. I.F.C. and I.F.L. champions ??? and I.F.L. runners-up ??? will also replace these relegated teams in 2021.

On 4 October 2020, ??? claimed their 8th S.F.C. crown and their first triumph since ??? when defeating ??? by ??? in the final at Healy Park.

The draw for the 2020 S.F.C. was made on 21 February 2020.

== Format ==
The championship has a straight knock out structure. The 16 teams that take part in the championship are the 16 teams in the Senior Football League (SFL). The emergence of the COVID-19 pandemic has effected relegation and promotion from the S.F.C. and I.F.C. in the following ways:

Relegation from SFC:

In 2020, it was decided that no club would be relegated from the S.F.C.

Promotion to SFC:

Two teams will be promoted to the S.F.C. for 2021, meaning that 18 teams will compete for the Tyrone S.F.C. in 2021. The I.F.C. champions and the I.F.L. champions will gain promotion to the top-flight.

== Team changes ==
The following teams have changed division since the 2019 championship season.

=== To S.F.C. ===
Promoted from 2019 Tyrone I.F.C.

- Galbally Pearses - (IFC & IFL Champions)
- Pomeroy Plunkett's - (IFL Runners-up)
- Loughmacrory St. Teresa's - (SFL/IFL promotion/relegation playoff Winner)

=== From S.F.C. ===
Relegated to 2020 I.F.C.

- Eglish St. Patrick's - (SFL/IFL promotion/relegation playoff Loser)
- Edendork St. Malachy's - (SFL Relegation Loser)
- Tattyreagh St. Patrick's - (16th in SFL)

== Round 1 ==
All 16 teams enter Round 1 in a random open draw. The 8 losers are eliminated from the championship while the 8 winners proceed to the quarter-finals.

| 13 August 2020 | Coalisland | 2-14 - 1-14 | Clonoe O'Rahilly's | Edendork; Referee: Sean Hurson (Galbally); Man of the Match: Plunkett Kane |
| 13 August 2020 | Plunkett Kane 1-3, Bailey Leonard 1-2 (0-1f), Tiarnan Quinn 0-3 (0-2f), Cormac O'Hagan (1 '45) and Patrick McNiece 0-2 each, Jason Carberry and Sean Corr 0-1 each | | Connor McAliskey 0-6 (0-5f), Daryl Magee 1-0, Ryan McCabe 0-2, Rhys Quinn, Patrick Doris, Stephen McNulty (0-1f), Declan McClure, PJ Lavery, Paul Coney 0-1 each | Edendork; Referee: Sean Hurson (Galbally); Man of the Match: Plunkett Kane |

| 14 August 2020 | Killyclogher | 2-13 - 2-10 | Carrickmore | Healy Park; Referee: Stephen Campbell (Stewartstown); Man of the Match: Mark Bradley |
| 14 August 2020 | Mark Bradley 1-8 (0-3f), Mark Hayes 1-0, Tiernan McCann 0-2, Conall McCann, Oisin McCann, Tiernan Cox 0-1 each | | Martin Penrose 1-2 (0-1f), Michael Donaghy 1-0, Rory Donnelly and Daniel Fullerton 0-2 each, Sean Loughran, Ciaran Daly, Ruairi Loughran, Barry Daly 0-1 each | Healy Park; Referee: Stephen Campbell (Stewartstown); Man of the Match: Mark Bradley |

| 15 August 2020 | Dungannon | 2-23 - 2-13 aet | Loughmacrory | Galbally; Referee: Martin Sludden (Dromore); Man of the Match: Paul Donaghy |
| 15 August 2020 | Paul Donaghy 0-9 (0-4f), Patrick Quinn 1-2 (0-1m), Lorcan Mallon 0-4 (0-1m), Kiefer Morgan 1-1, Matthew Walsh 0-2, Ciaran Barker (0-1f), Padraig McNulty, Oran Mallon, Patrick Molloy, Dalaigh Jones 0-1 each | | Cathair Gallagher 2-3 (0-1f, 0-1m), Cathal Donnelly 0-4 (0-1m), Diarmuid Gallagher 0-2, Pauric Meenagh, Colm Logue, Ciaran Ward, Leo Meenan 0-1 each | Galbally; Referee: Martin Sludden (Dromore); Man of the Match: Paul Donaghy |

| 15 August 2020 | Ardboe | 0-17 - 3-7 | Donaghmore | Coalisland; Referee: Shane Eanetta (Omagh); Man of the Match: Shea Hamill |
| 15 August 2020 | Kyle Coney 0-7 (0-6f), Conall Devlin and David Mulgrew (0-1m) 0-2 each, Ciaran Gervin, Michael Cassidy, Shay McGuigan, Oran Mulgrew, Michael Lynn, Cormac Morgan 0-1 each | | Shea Hamill, Tiarnan Drayne, Dermot McAleer 1-0 each, Cormac McCann 0-3f, Peter McKenna, Niall McKenna, Deasun Quinn (0-1f), Ryan Cush 0-1 each | Coalisland; Referee: Shane Eanetta (Omagh); Man of the Match: Shea Hamill |

| 16 August 2020 | Derrylaughan | 2-10 - 0-15 | Moy | Dungannon; Referee: Brian McCallion (Castlederg); Man of the Match: Michael Conroy |
| 16 August 2020 | James Donnelly 0-5 (0-3f), Conor McCabe and Brian Kennedy 1-0 each, Ciaran Quinn and Darragh Carney (0-1f) 0-2 each, Ciaran Gervin 0-1 | | Michael Conroy 0-13 (0-8f), Sean Cavanagh (0-1f) and Michael Carson 0-1 each | Dungannon; Referee: Brian McCallion (Castlederg); Man of the Match: Michael Conroy |

| 16 August 2020 | Dromore | 3-15 - 2-13 aet | Omagh | Loughmacrory; Referee: Shane Meehan (Glenelly); Man of the Match: Peter Teague |
| 16 August 2020 | Eoin McCusker 1-3 (0-2f), Peter Teague 0-4 (0-2f), Niall Sludden and Andrew McGrath 1-0 each, Emmett McNabb (1 '45) and Sean McDonnell (0-2f) 0-2 each, Nathan McCarron, Ryan McCusker, Sean McNabb, Ronan Magpie McNabb 0-1 each | | Ronan O'Neill 1-7 (1-0 pen, 0-5f), Damian McGuigan 1-1, Conor O'Donnell 0-2, Michael Gallagher, Daniel McCrossan, Michael Flanagan 0-1 each | Loughmacrory; Referee: Shane Meehan (Glenelly); Man of the Match: Peter Teague |

| 16 August 2020 | Errigal Ciarán | 1-20 - 0-11 | Pomeroy | Carrickmore; Referee: Mark O'Neill (Cookstown); Man of the Match: Aaron McAnenly |
| 16 August 2020 | Odhran Robinson 1-4, Peter Harte 0-5 (0-2f, 1 '45), Cathal Corrigan and Padraig McGirr (0-1f, 0-1m) 0-3 each, Niall Kelly 0-2, Ben McDonnell (0-1m) and Mark Kavanagh 0-1 each | | Kieran McGeary 0-7f, Hugh Pat McGeary and Ronan Duffin 0-2 each | Carrickmore; Referee: Mark O'Neill (Cookstown); Man of the Match: Aaron McAnenly |

| 17 August 2020 | Trillick | 1-9 - 0-7 | Galbally | Healy Park; Referee: Cathal Forbes (Ardboe); Man of the Match: James Garrity |
| 17 August 2020 | Lee Brennan 0-6 (0-3f, 1 '45), Simon Garrity 1-0, Richard Donnelly, Liam Gray, Ciaran Daly 0-1 each | | Liam Rafferty, Conor Donaghy (0-1f), Daniel Kerr 0-2 each, Enda McGarrity 0-1 | Healy Park; Referee: Cathal Forbes (Ardboe); Man of the Match: James Garrity |

== Quarter-finals ==
| 28 August 2020 | Trillick | 1-16 - 2-13 aet (Trillick won 4-3 on penalties) | Killyclogher | Healy Park |

| 29 August 2020 | Coalisland | 1-9 - 1-6 | Derrylaughan | Galbally |

| 30 August 2020 | Dungannon | 0-23 - 2-15 | Ardboe | Edendork |

| 30 August 2020 | Errigal Ciarán | 0-12 - 0-11 | Dromore | Carrickmore |

== Semi-finals ==
?? September 2020
Semi-Final

| ??? | -vs- | ??? |

???
?? September 2020
Semi-Final

| ??? | -vs- | ??? |

???

== Final ==
?? September 2020
Final

| ??? | -vs- | ??? |

Healy Park
