= Tyrone Intermediate Football Championship =

Annual Gaelic football competition

- Current season or competition: 2026 Tyrone Intermediate Football Championship
- Irish: Craobh Idirmheánach Peile Tír Eoghain
- Code: Gaelic football
- Founded: 1962
- Region: County Tyrone, Ulster (GAA)
- Trophy: Paddy Cullen Cup
- No. of teams: 16
- Title holders: Rock St. Patrick's (1st title)
- First winner: Cookstown Fr. Rock's
- Most titles: Pomeroy Plunketts Clonoe O'Rahilly's (5 titles)
- Sponsors: Connollys of Moy
- Official website: tyronegaa.ie

The Tyrone Intermediate Football Club Championship (known for sponsorship reasons as the Connollys of Moy Tyrone Intermediate Football Club Championship) is an annual Gaelic football competition contested by mid-tier Tyrone GAA clubs.

Rock St. Patrick's are the title holders (2026) defeating Pomeroy Plunketts in the final replay held at Dungannon on 17th October.

== History ==
The tournament was first held in 1962, with Cookstown Fr. Rock's the first champions defeating Galbally Pearses in the final.

The semi-final of the 2021 Tyrone Intermediate Football Championship was abandoned after eight minutes and an Air Ambulance had to land on the pitch at Healy Park to care for the injured.

From 2018, all championship games have been streamed live on Tyrone TV.

== Format ==
The 16 clubs in Division 2 of the All-County Football League in Tyrone compete on a straight knockout basis.

== Honours ==
The trophy presented to the winners is the Paddy Cullen Cup. Paddy Cullen was a former Chairman of the Tyrone County Board from 1951-1969 (except 1960). A native of Co. Leitrim, Mr. Cullen came to Tyrone in 1946 as a teacher and he taught in St. Mary's Boys' School Cookstown as well as Slate Quarry and Rock Primary Schools. Omagh St. Enda's were the first winners of the newly presented Paddy Cullen cup in October 1977.

The winners of the Tyrone Intermediate Football Championship qualify for the Ulster Intermediate Club Football Championship, representing their county, later that year. Six clubs have gone on to Ulster glory after winning Tyrone:- Brackaville (1999), Pomeroy (2004, 2016), Trillick (2008), Cookstown (2009, 2012), Moy (2017) and Galbally (2022).

The Ulster winners can then go on to compete in the All-Ireland Intermediate Club Football Championship. Cookstown (2010, 2013) and Moy (2018) have gone on to claim the All-Ireland after winning Ulster.

The winners of the Tyrone Intermediate Football Championship also gain promotion to Division 1 (from 1999 until 2007 Division 1B) of the Tyrone All-County Football league for the following season, regardless of their final standing in the Division 2 league that year. Therefore as the winners compete in the Tyrone Senior Football Championship the following year, the holders do not defend their title.

== List of finals ==
- Teams in black no longer exist

Year	Winner	Score	Opponent	Score	Date	Venue	Referee	Winning Captain
1962	Cookstown; Fr. Rock's	3-04	Galbally; Pearses	0-02	28/10/62	Dungannon	P. Devlin (Omagh)	Seamus Glackin
1963	Dungannon Thomas Clarkes	5-06	Moortown St. Malachy's	2-03	11/08/63	Coalisland	J. Martin (Omagh)	Arthur McRory
1964	Cookstown Fr. Rock's	2-05	Stewartstown Harps	1-05	30/08/64	Dungannon	P. Devlin (Omagh)	Seamus Glackin
1965	Donaghmore St. Patrick's	4-07	Augher St. Macartan's	1-07	29/08/65	Coalisland	D. Conway (Coalisland)	Sean Faloon
1966	Augher St. Macartan's	1-11	Eglish St. Patrick's	0-07	28/08/66	Dungannon	M. Quinn (Derrylaughan)	Ray McKenna
1967	Pomeroy Plunketts	0-07	Donaghmore St. Patrick's	0-04	01/10/67	Dungannon	D. Conway (Coalisland)	Paddy Cunningham
1968	Donaghmore St. Patrick's	1-10	Moortown St. Malachy's	1-03	13/10/68	Coalisland	J. Martin (Omagh)	Anthony Gallagher
1969	Edendork St. Malachy's	2-08	Leckpatrick	1-05	05/10/69	Pomeroy	F. McClean (Ballygawley)	Jim McGeary
1970	Owen Roe O'Neills	4-09	Pomeroy Plunketts	1-05	16/08/70	Dunmoyle	M. Devlin (Derrylaughan)	Brian Ward
1971	Kildress Wolfe Tones	0-05	Moortown St. Malachy's	1-02	29/08/71	Coalisland	P. Devlin (Omagh)	
(r)	Kildress Wolfe Tones	1-05	Moortown St. Malachy's	0-06	26/09/71	Coalisland	P. Devlin (Omagh)	Patsy Grimes
1972	Dungannon Thomas Clarkes	2-05	Clonoe O'Rahilly's	0-04	10/09/72	Coalisland	J. Heaney (Beragh)	Noel Hughes
1973	Killyman St. Mary's	3-04	Moortown St. Malachy's	2-02	21/10/73	Coalisland	J. Taggart (Omagh)	Mickey Hughes
1974	Dromore St. Dympna's	2-07	Moortown St. Malachy's	0-08	18/08/74	Pomeroy	P. Quinn (Killyclogher)	Ciaran McElduff
1975	Moortown St. Malachy's	3-07	Edendork St. Malachy's	2-06	17/08/75	Cookstown	B. Taggart (Clonoe)	Mark Quinn
1976	Clonoe O'Rahilly's	3-10	Pomeroy Plunketts	0-04	22/08/76	Dungannon	J. Martin (An Charraig Mhór)	Peter Brady
1977	Omagh St. Enda's	2-09	Fintona Pearses	1-06	02/10/77	Carrickmore	J.P. Dorrity (Stewartstown)	Liam Turbett
1978	Fintona Pearses	4-11	Killyclogher St. Mary's	0-03	03/09/78	Beragh	L. Duffy (Cookstown)	Cathal McCann
1979	Clonoe O'Rahilly's	1-07	Owen Roe O'Neills	1-07	19/08/79	Pomeroy	M. Harvey (Pomeroy)	
(r)	Clonoe O'Rahilly's	3-05	Owen Roe O'Neills	0-06	09/09/79	Pomeroy	M. Harvey (Pomeroy)	Paddy McKee
1980	Stewartstown Harps	1-06	Augher St. Macartan's	0-08	17/08/80	Dungannon	P. Quinn (Killyclogher)	Dessie Bleeks
1981	Aghyaran St. Davog's	0-10	Coalisland Na Fianna	0-08	16/08/81	Beragh	E. Mullan (Ballygawley)	Ciaran McGarvey
1982	Moy Tír Na nÓg	2-09	Kildress Wolfe Tones	0-06	22/08/82	Donaghmore	J. Hackett (Eskra)	Edward Coyne
1983	Clonoe O'Rahilly's	1-03	Aghyaran St. Davog's	0-06	14/08/83	Beragh	L. Duffy (Cookstown)	
(r)	Clonoe O'Rahilly's	1-04	Aghyaran St. Davog's	0-04	04/09/83	Beragh	J. Curran (Ardboe)	Paddy McKee
1984	Coalisland Na Fianna	1-07	Fintona Pearses	1-03	02/09/84	Carrickmore	J. Heaney (Beragh)	Damien O'Hagan
1985	Edendork St. Malachy's	1-11	Ballygawley St. Ciaran's	0-08	01/09/85	Pomeroy	P. Taggart (Clonoe)	Joe Mallon
1986	Killeeshil St. Mary's	0-08	Donaghmore St. Patrick's	0-08	26/10/86	Dungannon	D. Slater (Dungannon)	
(r)	Killeeshil St. Mary's		Donaghmore St. Patrick's		09/11/86	Dungannon	D. Slater (Dungannon)	Brendan McDonald
1987	Aghyaran St. Davog's	1-10	Fintona Pearses	0-07	01/11/87	Omagh	L. Duffy (Cookstown)	Ciaran McGarvey
1988	Donaghmore St. Patrick's	0-05	Brocagh Emmetts	0-04	21/08/88	Pomeroy	P. Corrigan (Urney)	Paul O'Neill
1989	Gortin St. Patrick's	1-09	Beragh Red Knights	1-07	20/08/89	Pomeroy	B. Taggart (Clonoe)	Paddy McCrory
1990	Ardboe O'Donovan Rossa GAC	4-09	Stewartstown Harps	0-06	22/07/90	Coalisland	E. Mullan (Errigal Ciaran)	Malachy Coyle
1991	Pomeroy Plunketts	0-05	Edendork St. Malachy's	0-05	04/08/91	Coalisland	J. Curran (Ardboe)	
(r)	Pomeroy Plunketts	2-05	Edendork St. Malachy's	0-03	24/08/91	Coalisland	J. Curran (Ardboe)	Niall Kilpatrick
1992	Eglish St. Patrick's	1–10	Beragh Red Knights	0-08	09/08/92	Carrickmore	K. Skelton (Drumquin)	Jody McGrath
1993	Beragh Red Knights	0-12	Edendork St. Malachy's	1-06	08/08/93	Pomeroy	B. Taggart (Clonoe)	Patsy Farley
1994	Drumquin Wolfe Tones	0-15	Aghaloo O'Neill's	2-04	04/09/94	Clogher	H. McNally (Moortown)	Noel Donnelly
1995	Clonoe O'Rahilly's	1-07	Pomeroy Plunketts	2-02	22/10/95	Edendork	P. O'Brien (Loughmacrory)	Sean McCabe
1996	Donaghmore St. Patrick's	2-11	Newtownstewart St Eugene's	0-07	20/10/96	Killyclogher	A. Richardson (Tattyreagh)	Gareth Hughes
1997	Eglish St. Patrick's	2-06	Killeeshil St Mary's	1-05	10/08/97	Carrickmore	S. Harvey (Aghyaran)	Neil Gildernew
1998	Clann Na nGael	0-08	Moy Tír Na nÓg	0-06	06/09/98	Carrickmore	P. O'Neill (Cookstown)	Mark Dooher
1999	Brackaville Owen Roes	1-06	Aghyaran St. Davog's	0-09	29/08/99	Omagh	J. Kerlin (Clann Na nGael)	
(r)	Brackaville Owen Roes	4-08	Aghyaran St. Davog's	0-07	05/09/99	Omagh	J. Kerlin (Clann Na nGael)	Enda McGuinness
2000	Beragh Red Knights	0-11	Gortin St. Patrick's	0-11	27/08/00	Carrickmore	C. Coyle (Moortown)	
(r)	Beragh Red Knights	1-07	Gortin St. Patrick's	0-05	10/09/00	Carrickmore	J. Kerlin (Clann Na nGael)	Sean Owens
2001	Dungannon Thomas Clarkes	0-12	Fintona Pearses	0-11	02/09/01	Omagh	J. Kerlin (Clann Na nGael)	Shane Treanor
2002	Aghaloo O'Neill's	0–10	Killeeshil St. Mary's	1-06	06/10/02	Omagh	M. Sludden (Dromore)	Felim Óg Gildernew
2003	Gortin St. Patrick's	1–16	Pomeroy Plunketts	0-09	21/09/03	Dunmoyle	M. Mohan (Eglish)	Barry McCullagh
2004	Pomeroy Plunketts	0–15	Eskra Emmetts	1-05	03/10/04	Omagh	M. Hughes (Donaghmore)	Ciaran McKenna
2005	Aghaloo O'Neill's	1-08	Stewartstown Harps	1-07	14/08/05	Omagh	K. Kelly (Kildress)	Felim Óg Gildernew
2006	Stewartstown Harps	0–14	Strabane Sigerson's	0-07	01/10/06	Omagh	S. McNamee (Newtownstewart)	John Devlin
2007	Killyman St. Mary's	1–10	Moortown St. Malachy's	0–11	30/09/07	Omagh	C. O'Hagan (Brackaville)	Colm McVeigh
2008	Trillick St. Macartan's	0-07	Moy Tír Na nÓg	0-05	19/10/08	Carrickmore	S. McCartan (Loughmacrory)	Prionsais O'Kane
2009	Cookstown Fr. Rock's	2-07	Gortin St. Patrick's	1-06	11/10/09	Omagh	E. McHugh (Aghyaran)	Barry Hughes
2010	Derrylaughan Kevin Barry's	1-09	Urney St. Columba's	2-05	10/10/10	Omagh	E. McConnell (Clogher)	Martin McStravog
2011	Kildress Wolfe Tones	1–15	Galbally Pearses	1-09	16/10/11	Omagh	J. McElroy (Aghaloo)	Des Tracey
2012	Cookstown Fr. Rock's	0-05	Eskra Emmetts	0-05	14/10/12	Omagh	F. Daly (Gortin)	
(r)	Cookstown Fr. Rock's	1–12	Eskra Emmetts	0-07	19/10/12	Omagh	S. Quinn (Brackaville)	Owen Mulligan
2013	Eskra Emmetts	2-09	Urney St. Columba's	2-05	20/10/13	Omagh	S. Hurson (Galbally)	Peter Hughes
2014	Dungannon Thomas Clarkes	4–11	Trillick St. Macartan's	0–14	05/10/14	Omagh	E. McHugh (Aghyaran)	Kiefer Morgan
2015	Edendork St. Malachy's	2–12	Urney St. Columba's	1–12	04/10/15	Omagh	S. Meehan (Glenelly)	Harry Óg Conlon
2016	Pomeroy Plunketts	3–12	Derrylaughan Kevin Barry's	1–12	09/10/16	Omagh	M. Sludden (Dromore)	Hugh Pat McGeary
2017	Moy Tír Na nÓg	2-05	Derrylaughan Kevin Barrys	1-07	08/10/17	Carrickmore	B. McCallion (Castlederg)	Eunan Deeney
2018	Tattyreagh St. Patrick's	2–12	Augher St. Macartan's	2-09	21/10/18	Omagh	M. Sludden (Dromore)	Niall Keyes
2019	Galbally Pearses	0–18	Pomeroy Plunketts	1–14	06/10/19	Omagh	F. Ward (Errigal Ciaran)	Sean Murphy / Enda McGarrity
2020	Edendork St. Malachy's	1–17	Gortin St. Patrick's	1-09	19/09/20	Omagh	K. Eannetta (Omagh)	Conor Mallon
2021	Moortown St. Malachy's	0–11	Owen Roe O'Neills	0-06	13/11/21	Omagh	S. Campbell (Stewartstown)	Ryan Kelly
2022	Galbally Pearses	2–11	Edendork St. Malachy's	3-07	23/10/22	Omagh	C. Forbes (Ardboe)	Aidan Carberry
2023	Pomeroy Plunketts	0–13	Moy Tír Na nÓg	2-04	28/10/23	Omagh	M. Loughran (Errigal Ciaran)	Frank Burns
2024	Derrylaughan Kevin Barry's	1–10	Moy Tír Na nÓg	0–11	19/10/24	Omagh	P. Gallagher (Castlederg)	Brian Kennedy
2025	Clonoe O'Rahilly's	2-13	Eglish St. Patrick's	1-14	19/10/25	Dungannon	K. Eannetta (Omagh)	Declan McClure
2026	Rock St. Patrick's	0-11	Pomeroy Plunketts	0-11	11/10/26	Dungannon	C. Bell (Killeeshil)	
(r)	Rock St. Patrick's	0-23	Pomeroy Plunketts	1-13	17/10/26	Dungannon	S. Meehan (Glenelly)	Aidan McGarrity

== Wins listed by club ==
#	Club	Wins	Years won
1	Clonoe	5	1976, 1979, 1983, 1995, 2025
1	Pomeroy	5	1967, 1991, 2004, 2016, 2023
3	Cookstown	4	1962, 1964, 2009, 2012
3	Donaghmore	4	1965, 1968, 1988, 1996
3	Dungannon	4	1963, 1972, 2001, 2014
3	Edendork	4	1969, 1985, 2015, 2020
7	Aghaloo	2	2002, 2005
7	Aghyaran	2	1981, 1987
7	Beragh	2	1993, 2000
7	Derrylaughan	2	2010, 2024
7	Eglish	2	1992, 1997
7	Galbally	2	2019, 2022
7	Gortin	2	1989, 2003
7	Kildress	2	1971, 2011
7	Killyman	2	1973, 2007
7	Moortown	2	1975, 2021
7	Moy	2	1982, 2017
7	Stewartstown	2	1980, 2006
19	Ardboe	1	1990
19	Augher	1	1966
19	Brackaville	1	1999
19	Clann Na nGael	1	1998
19	Coalisland	1	1984
19	Dromore	1	1974
19	Drumquin	1	1994
19	Eskra	1	2013
19	Fintona	1	1978
19	Killeeshil	1	1986
19	Omagh	1	1977
19	Owen Roes	1	1970
19	Rock	1	2026
19	Tattyreagh	1	2018
19	Trillick	1	2008
