= Owen Roe O'Neill's GAC =

Tyrone-based Gaelic games club

- CLG Eoghan Rua Uí Néill
- Founded: 1970
- County: Tyrone
- Nickname: Owen Roes, The Roes
- Colours: Green and red
- Grounds: Páirc an Ghleanna, Glenmornan
- Coordinates: 54°50′33.16″N 7°21′24.72″W

Playing kits
Standard	Reserve

Owen Roe O'Neill's Gaelic Athletic Club (Irish: CLG Eoghan Rua Uí Néill) is a Gaelic Athletic Association club in Tyrone GAA. The club is based in the parish of Leckpatrick, including the village of Glenmornan, County Tyrone, Northern Ireland.

The Club, named after the 17th-century Irish Confederate general Eoghan Rua Ó Néill, plays Gaelic football and ladies' Gaelic football.

== History ==
The club was formed in February 1970 by the amalgamation of Leckpatrick Pearse Óg GAC and Dunamanagh GAC. Since then the Dunamanagh players formed their own Club and Owen Roe's solely became a Leckpatrick Club.

== Gaelic football ==
The club's men's Senior and Reserve teams currently competes in the second division of the Tyrone All-County Leagues and Intermediate championships. It has in the past played at Junior level and (up to 1978) at Senior level. In its first year, 1970, the club won the Tyrone Intermediate League and Championship double. In 1975 it reached the Senior Football Championship final, losing to Trillick. In 2018 the Club also fielded a Ladies team at adult level for the first in several seasons.

The club also fields under-age teams for several age groups, with five of its teams reaching county finals in 2010, and four in 2011. In 2018 the Club had mixed boys and girls teams at U-8 and U-10 level, a boys U-12 team as well as separate boys and girls teams at U-14, U-16 and U-18 level.

== Honours ==
- Tyrone Intermediate Football Championship: (1)
  - 1970
- Tyrone All-County League Division 2: (2)
  - 1970, 1981
- Tyrone All-County League Division 3: (2)
  - 2003, 2017

== Facilities ==
The Club's home grounds, Páirc an Ghleanna in Glenmornan, in the parish of Leckpatrick, were opened in May 1987. The Club commenced a major development project in 2008. The grounds at Páirc an Ghleanna reopened in 2010.
