= Moortown, County Tyrone =

Rural area in Northern Ireland, UK

Coordinates: 54°37′59″N 6°30′55″W

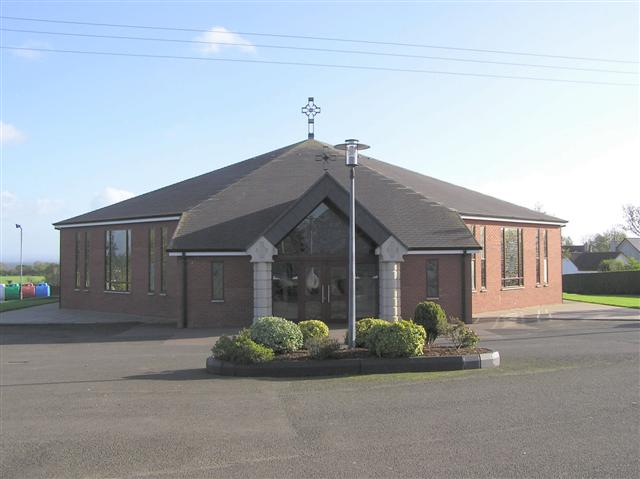
Moortown's Catholic church is the Church of the Immaculate Conception

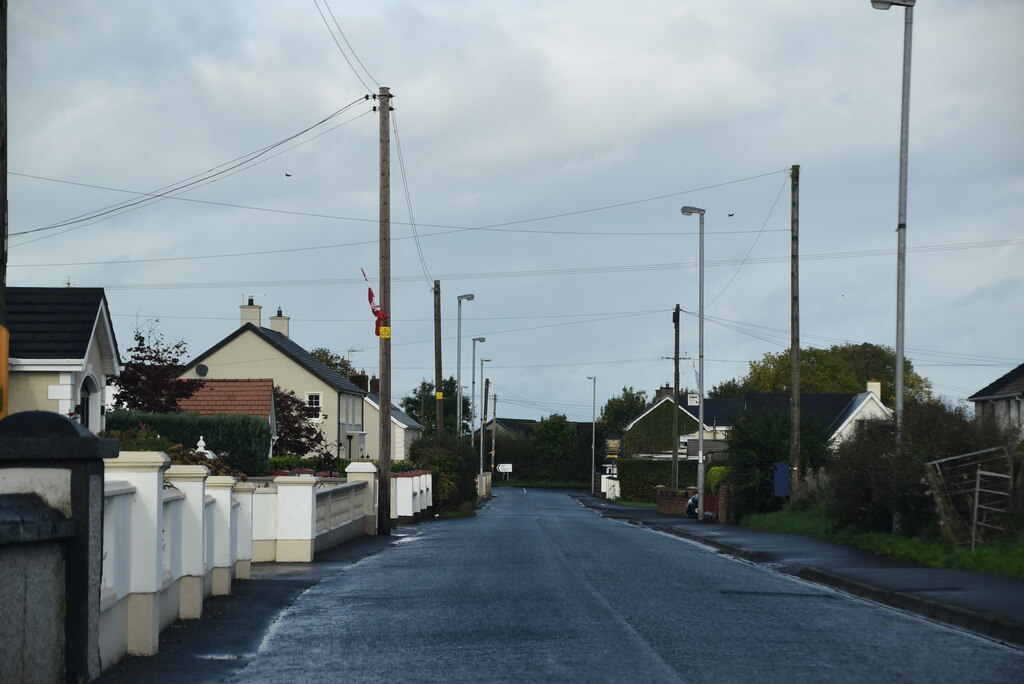
Ardboe Road, Moortown

Moortown is a rural area in the north east of County Tyrone, Northern Ireland. It lies on the western shores of Lough Neagh, beside Ballinderry and Ardboe. It is close to the towns of Cookstown, Magherafelt and Dungannon. It is in Mid Ulster District Council area.

== History ==
Ardboe townland, the site of the 10th-century Ardboe High Cross, is located near Moortown. Other local places of interest, on the shores of Lough Neagh, include the Kinturk Cultural Centre, Coyles Cottage and Battery Harbour.

== Sport ==
Gaelic football is one of main sports in the area. The local Gaelic Athletic Association (GAA) club is Moortown St Malachy's GAC (Irish: Baile na Móna CLG). The club won the senior county championship in 1992. Chris Lawn, a former club member, won two All-Ireland medals with the Tyrone county team. The home pitch was Tobin Park but has now relocated to an adjacent new leisure complex at Anneeter Road.

Moortown previously had a successful hurling club. This was formed around 1960 and competed in the Tyrone league and later in the South Derry and Armagh leagues. Several Moortown hurlers represented County Tyrone at both minor and senior hurling level during the 1960s and 1970s.

A camogie team also previously existed in Moortown during the 1950s. A camogie team was also more recently formed.
