= Pomeroy =

Pomeroy may refer to:

== Places ==
=== United Kingdom ===
- Pomeroy, County Tyrone, a village, civil parish and town land in Northern Ireland
- Pomeroy, Derbyshire, a place in Derbyshire, England
- Berry Pomeroy, a village and civil parish in the South Hams district of Devon, England

=== United States ===
- Pomeroy, Iowa
- Pomeroy, Kansas
- Pomeroy, Ohio
- Pomeroy, Pennsylvania
- Pomeroy, Washington

=== South Africa ===
- Pomeroy, KwaZulu-Natal

== People ==
- see Pomeroy (surname)
- Pomeroy Parker (1874–1946), private serving in the United States Marine Corps during the Spanish–American War who received the Medal of Honor for bravery
- Pomeroy Tucker (1802–1870), journalist and New York politician

=== Characters ===
- Craig Pomeroy, character from the TV series Baywatch
- Gina Pomeroy, character from the TV series Baywatch
- Karen Pomeroy, played by Drew Barrymore, in the 2001 movie Donnie Darko

== Rail ==
- Pomeroy and Newark Railroad, a predecessor of the Pennsylvania Railroad in the U.S. states of Delaware and Pennsylvania
- Pomeroy railway station, railroad station in Pomeroy, County Tyrone, Northern Ireland

== Other ==
- Pomeroy scale in jazz, also known as the altered scale
- Pomeroy bullet, a incendiary ammunition
- USNS Pomeroy (T-AKR-316), a United States Navy cargo ship
- Berry Pomeroy Castle, a Tudor mansion within the walls of an earlier castle
- Pomeroy procedure for tubal ligation in female sterilization developed by Ralph Pomeroy
