= Augher St Macartan's GAC =

Tyrone-based Gaelic games club

Augher St Macartan's
- An Eochair Naomh Mhic Artáin
- Founded: 1957
- County: Tyrone
- Colours: Yellow & Black
- Grounds: Father Hackett Park
- Coordinates: 54°26′10.20″N 7°07′13.01″W

Playing kits
Standard	Reserve

Senior Club Championships
	All Ireland	Ulster champions	Tyrone champions
Football:	-	-	3

Augher St Macartan's (Irish: An Eochair Naoimh Mhic Artáin) is a Gaelic Athletic Association club based in Augher, County Tyrone, Northern Ireland.

The club concentrates on Gaelic football, a Ladies Gaelic football club is also in existence in Augher called St. Macartan's whose catchment area includes neighbouring Clogher and Eskra.

== History ==
Augher St Macartan's have won the Tyrone Senior Football Championship on 3 occasions: 1976,1982 & 1985.

Also won Division 1 of the Tyrone All-County Football League in 1986.

In 2008 Augher won the Tyrone Junior Football Championship, by beating neighbouring club Aghaloo in the final, on a scoreline of 1:09 to 0:09. This was the clubs first adult championship win since 1985.

The 2011 youth season brought about a change for An Eochair Naoimh Mhic Artáin and neighbouring club, and rivals Clogher Eire og. A lack of attendance, and general numbers at both clubs meant both clubs forming together to form Gael Naomh Padraig GFC. This system has been put in place in all competitive youth levels (Under-13 to Minor) and has meant youth players from both clubs guaranteed football and also playing in a higher standard that they may have played in before. Once the players have finished their time at youth football, they then play for their original club at senior and reserve level. The agreement put in place at the minute means that players who may qualify to play both minor and senior football, can do so without any problems. 2020 brought an end to the amalgamation of Augher and Clogher which now means youth players can now proudly represent Augher and don the Amber and Black.

In 2013 the club gained promotion back to the top flight after a 21-year absence, by defeating Edendork in the promotion/relegation playoff final in 2012.

Aloysius Hackett served as the chairman of the club.

== Achievements ==
- Tyrone Senior Football Championship: (3)
  - 1976, 1982, 1985
- Tyrone Intermediate Football Championship: (1)
  - 1966
- Tyrone Junior Football Championship: (1)
  - 2008
- Tyrone All-County League Division 1: (1)
  - 1986
