= Pomeroy, Kansas =

Extinct Hamlet in northeast Kansas, U.S.

Coordinates: 39°10′06″N 94°45′41″W

Pomeroy is a neighborhood of Kansas City, Kansas, in the United States.

Pomeroy was platted as a village in 1871. The settlement lied on the south side of the Missouri River in northwestern Quindaro Township, Wyandotte County, Kansas. It was located along the Pacific Railroad between the stops of Connor and Nearman
