= Moortown St Malachy's GAC =

Tyrone-based Gaelic games club

Moortown St Malachy's
- Baile na Móna Naomh Maoileachlainn
- County: Tyrone
- Nickname: The Malachys (formerly known as The Geraldines)
- Colours: Red and White hoops
- Grounds: Tobin Park, Moortown
- Coordinates: 54°37′55.38″N 6°30′44.64″W

Playing kits
Standard colours

Senior Club Championships
	All Ireland	Ulster champions	Tyrone champions
Football:	0	0	4

Moortown St Malachy's is a GAA club based in the village of Moortown in County Tyrone, Northern Ireland.

== History ==
Moortown are one of the most successful clubs in Tyrone having won four Tyrone Senior Football Championships in 1941, 1942, 1950 and 1992.

Moortown St Malachy’s celebrated their centenary year in 2023.

Their last county championship victory came in 1992 and the side was captained by James Devlin. However, the Malachys have a less than inspiring record in finals and on innumerable occasions have reached junior, intermediate and senior finals and then fallen at the final hurdle.

The club used to field a hurling team in the 1970s, competing in the Derry league.

Their pitch for many years, Tobin Park, has now reached the end of its use and the club has moved to their new pitch on Aneeter Road. There are three pitches, a warm up area and just recently, a new community hall has been developed. The club recently, from 2023 to 2025, have implemented changing rooms and gym.

Within only four years of formation, the Ladies senior team have been promoted to the top tier for 2023 and for the first time in the club's history they will have both Senior Ladies and Men's teams compete in Division 1.

== Honours ==
=== Men's football ===
- Tyrone Senior Football Championship: (4)
  - 1941, 1942, 1950, 1992
- Tyrone Intermediate Football Championship: (2)
  - 1975, 2021
- Tyrone Junior Football Championship: (5)
  - 1934, 1948, 1950, 1952, 1969
