= Strabane Sigersons GAC =

Tyrone-based Gaelic games club

Strabane Sigersons
- An Srath Bán Mhic Sioghair
- Founded: 1902
- County: Tyrone
- Nickname: Sigersons
- Colours: Light Blue & Navy
- Grounds: Sigerson Park - Páirc Mhíc Sioghair
- Coordinates: 54°49′00.29″N 7°27′26.01″W

Playing kits
| Standard | Reserve |

Senior Club Championships
| | All Ireland | Ulster champions | Tyrone champions |
|---|---|---|---|
| Football: | - | - | 2 |
| Hurling: | - | - | 2 |

Strabane Sigersons (Irish: An Srath Bán Mhic Sioghair) is a Gaelic Athletic Association club. The club is based in the town of Strabane, County Tyrone, Northern Ireland.

The club concentrates on Gaelic football activities accommodating for both males and females from the ages of 4 until adult level. Another club in the town is Shamrocks, which fields teams for the games of Hurling and Camogie.

The senior men's team currently play in the Junior league after being relegated from the Intermediate league in 2023.

The senior Ladies team won the Junior 'B' League and Championship in 2023 and play Junior Football.
