= Tyrone Reserve Football Championships =

Annual Gaelic football competition

- Irish: Craobh Peile na gCúltaca Tír Eoghain
- Code: Gaelic football
- Founded: 1975
- Region: County Tyrone, Ulster (GAA)
- No. of teams: 49
- Title holders: Division 1: Errigal Ciaran (11th title)
- Most titles: Division 1: Errigal Ciaran (11 titles)
- Sponsors: Connollys of Moy
- Official website: https://tyronegaa.ie/

The Tyrone Reserve Football Championships are annual Gaelic football competitions consisting of three tiers contested by Tyrone GAA clubs. Currently the three tiers are Division 1 (Senior), Division 2 (Intermediate) and Division 3 (Junior). The Tyrone County Board of the Gaelic Athletic Association has organised these competitions since 1975.

From 1975 to 1981 there was just one competition for all teams. In 1982 a second competition was introduced for Division 2 and Division 3 teams, and in 1983 a third competition was introduced thus providing each division with a separate championship.

== Player eligibility ==
Players who play in any of the current years' Inter-County Senior Championship are not eligible to play in the Reserve Knock-Out.

If a player has played in his clubs’ last Adult Championship match within the county, in which he is eligible to play in the previous year, he is ineligible to play in this years’ Reserve Knockout even if the clubs’ last Adult Championship game falls outside that competition year.

== Holders ==
As of 2026,

- Errigal Ciaran are the Division 1 Senior Reserve title holders
- Cookstown Fr. Rock's are the Division 2 Intermediate Reserve title holders
- Drumragh Sarsfields are the Division 3 Junior Reserve title holders.

All-County Reserve Football Leagues are also held each season.

== Roll of honour ==
Year			
1975	Ardboe		
1976	Ardboe		
1977	No competition		
1978	An Charraig Mhór		
1979	Dromore		
1980	Fintona		
1981	Ballygawley		
	Division 1 (Senior)	Division 2/3 (Intermediate/Junior)	
1982	Dromore	Coalisland	
	Division 1 (Senior)	Division 2 (Intermediate)	Division 3 (Junior)
1983	Dromore	Coalisland	Drumragh
1984	Omagh	Beragh	Strabane
1985	Ardboe	Beragh	Drumragh
1986	Eglish	Aughabrack	Newtownstewart
1987	Coalisland	Killyclogher	Beragh
1988	Dromore	Stewartstown	Beragh
1989	Dromore	Moortown	Drumragh
1990	Coalisland	Galbally	Urney
1991	Moortown	Urney	Newtownstewart
1992	Errigal Ciaran	Edendork	Owen Roes
1993	Errigal Ciaran	Edendork	Strabane
1994	Dungannon	Derrylaughan	Aughabrack
1995	An Charraig Mhór	Derrylaughan	Strabane
1996	Dungannon	Strabane	Killeeshil
1997	An Charraig Mhór	Trillick	Fintona
1998	Dromore	Gortin	Owen Roes
1999	An Charraig Mhór	Killeeshil	Drumragh
2000	Clonoe	Killeeshil	Eskra
2001	An Charraig Mhór	Dungannon	Castlederg
2002	Ardboe	Gortin	Drumragh
2003	Errigal Ciaran	Drumquin	Fintona
2004	Errigal Ciaran	Greencastle	Fintona
2005	Ardboe	Derrylaughan	Beragh
2006	Errigal Ciaran	Eglish	Beragh
2007	Clonoe	Fintona	Brackaville
2008	Clonoe	Trillick	Errigal Ciaran
2009	Errigal Ciaran	Strabane	Brackaville
2010	Clonoe	Eglish	Brackaville
2011	Dromore	Gortin	Brackaville
2012	Errigal Ciaran	Pomeroy	Fintona
2013	Clonoe	Pomeroy	Loughmacrory
2014	Clonoe	Loughmacrory	Tattyreagh
2015	Dromore	Galbally	Glenelly
2016	Errigal Ciaran	Donaghmore	Fintona
2017	Omagh	Dungannon	Drumragh
2018	Errigal Ciaran	Greencastle	Errigal Ciaran
2019	Errigal Ciaran	Greencastle	Drumragh
2020	Dromore	Moortown	No record of competition
2021	Killyclogher	Kildress	Drumragh
2022	Dromore	Pomeroy	Stewartstown
2023	Donaghmore	Clonoe	Drumragh
2024	Killyclogher	Moy	Eskra
2025	Omagh	Clonoe	Strabane
2026	Errigal Ciaran	Cookstown	Drumragh

== List of Division 1 (Senior) finals ==
Year	Winner	Score	Opponent	Score	Date	Venue
1975	Ardboe	2-09	Ballygawley	2-05	16/11/75	Donaghmore
1976	Ardboe	2-07	An Charraig Mhór	1-06	28/11/76	Cookstown
1977	No competition					
1978	An Charraig Mhór	1-05	Dromore	0-04	13/08/78	Beragh
1979	Dromore	3-11	Derrylaughan	0-05	27/07/79	Omagh
1980	Fintona	0-10	An Charraig Mhór	1-06	18/07/80	Beragh
1981	Ballygawley	2-07	Derrylaughan	2-07	23/08/81	Pomeroy
(r)	Ballygawley	1-05	Ballygawley	0-06	29/08/81	Pomeroy
1982	Dromore	2-04	Derrylaughan	1-05	18/07/82	Carrickmore
1983	Dromore	1-12	Omagh	3-06	06/08/83	Beragh
(r)	Dromore	1-14	Omagh	0-04	13/08/83	Beragh
1984	Omagh	4-10	Moortown	0-04	23/06/84	Pomeroy
1985	Ardboe	0-06	Coalisland	1-03	07/07/85	Cookstown
(r)	Ardboe	1-07	Coalisland	0-02	03/08/85	Cookstown
1986	Eglish	0-07	Derrylaughan	1-04	14/06/86	Coalisland
(r)	Eglish	3-07	Derrylaughan	1-08	28/06/86	Dungannon
1987	Coalisland	0-09	Ardboe	0-05	20/06/87	Derrylaughan
1988	Dromore	0-04	Ballygawley	0-02	16/07/88	Omagh
1989	Dromore	1-09	Omagh	1-07	01/07/89	Beragh
1990	Coalisland	4-10	Aghyaran	0-04	16/06/90	Carrickmore
1991	Moortown	2-09	Ardboe	0-08	29/06/91	Derrylaughan
1992	Errigal Ciaran	0-10	Donaghmore	0-04	04/07/92	Pomeroy
1993	Errigal Ciaran	5-09	Moortown	2-08	26/06/93	Eglish
1994	Dungannon	6-06	Moortown	3-05	25/06/94	Coalisland
1995	An Charraig Mhór	1-08	Ardboe	1-06	24/06/95	Donaghmore
1996	Dungannon	1-09	Moortown	0-06	22/06/96	Coalisland
1997	An Charraig Mhór	0-12	Dromore	2-04	05/07/97	Clogher
1998	Dromore	0-15	An Charraig Mhór	1-12	04/07/98	Eskra
(r)	Dromore	2-06	An Charraig Mhór	1-07	28/07/98	Eskra
1999	An Charraig Mhór	1-11	Errigal Ciaran	0-08	28/07/99	Killyclogher
2000	Clonoe	0-10	An Charraig Mhór	0-09	19/08/00	Donaghmore
2001	An Charraig Mhór	2-09	Clonoe	1-09	08/09/01	Pomeroy
2002	Ardboe	0-10	Coalisland	1-05	16/11/02	Edendork
2003	Errigal Ciaran	0-13	An Charraig Mhór	2-05	10/08/03	Fintona
2004	Errigal Ciaran	1-13	Clonoe	1-07	31/10/04	Killeeshil
2005	Ardboe	0-12	An Charraig Mhór	0-08	12/11/05	Edendork
2006	Errigal Ciaran	1-07	An Charraig Mhór	0-06	25/11/06	Killeeshil
2007	Clonoe	1-12	Ardboe	1-06	07/07/07	Dungannon
2008	Clonoe	1-09	Coalisland	1-08	22/08/08	Brackaville
2009	Errigal Ciaran	3-15	An Charraig Mhór	1-08	26/09/09	Galbally
2010	Clonoe	0-08	Errigal Ciaran	0-07	07/11/10	Eglish
2011	Dromore	2-08	Coalisland	0-09	15/10/11	Galbally
2012	Errigal Ciaran	1-13	Omagh	2-09	21/11/12	Omagh
2013	Clonoe	2-10	Coalisland	0-07	16/11/13	Edendork
2014	Clonoe	0-09	Ardboe	0-08	11/07/14	Edendork
2015	Dromore	2-13	Coalisland	2-10	03/09/15	Clogher
2016	Errigal Ciaran	3-06	Dromore	0-04	09/12/16	Garvaghey
2017	Omagh	4-08	Dromore	1-12	22/10/17	Carrickmore
2018	Errigal Ciaran	1-16	Omagh	1-08	10/08/18	Omagh
2019	Errigal Ciaran	1-12	Omagh	2-07	15/11/19	Omagh
2020	Dromore	0-15	An Charraig Mhór	0-07	16/05/21	Drumragh
2021	Killyclogher	2-09	Pomeroy	1-07	26/08/21	Loughmacrory
2022	Dromore	2-11	An Charraig Mhór	2-09	18/08/22	Beragh
2023	Donaghmore	0-10	Trillick	0-09	06/09/23	Pairc Eire Óg, Carrickmore
2024	Killyclogher	1-11	Trillick	0-08	31/08/24	Fintona
2025	Omagh	2-17	Killyclogher	1-14	10/08/25	Loughmacrory
2026	Errigal Ciaran	3-12	Donaghmore	1-15	09/09/26	Pairc Chormaic, Eglish

== List of Division 2 (Intermediate) finals ==
Year	Winner	Score	Opponent	Score	Date	Venue
1982	Coalisland	1-07	Dungannon	0-07	26/06/82	Donaghmore
1983	Coalisland	2-10	Aghyaran	2-04	11/06/83	Beragh
1984	Beragh	2-07	Edendork	0-08	30/06/84	Pomeroy
1985	Beragh	1-08	Edendork	2-03	29/06/85	Donaghmore
1986	Aughabrack	2-08	Aghyaran	1-01	23/08/86	Omagh
1987	Killyclogher	2-12	Pomeroy	1-07	20/06/87	Beragh
1988	Stewartstown	1-09	Galbally	1-05	03/09/88	Dungannon
1989	Moortown	0-11	Gortin	0-03	01/07/89	Pomeroy
1990	Galbally	1-07	Beragh	1-07	16/06/90	Carrickmore
(r)	Galbally	2-14	Beragh	0-05	23/06/90	Carrickmore
1991	Urney	1-09	Rock	1-03	29/06/91	Loughmacrory
1992	Edendork	1-10	Rock	0-07	04/07/92	Pomeroy
1993	Edendork	2-13	Beragh	0-08	26/06/93	Eglish
1994	Derrylaughan	1-08	Killyclogher	1-05	25/06/94	Kildress
1995	Derrylaughan	2-06	Gortin	0-11	22/06/95	Kildress
1996	Strabane	2-13	Derrylaughan	2-10	22/06/96	Beragh
1997	Trillick	0-10	Strabane	0-01	27/06/97	Drumquin
1998	Gortin	2-09	Kildress	2-08	24/07/98	Loughmacrory
1999	Killeeshil	1-11	Brackaville	0-10	25/07/99	Moy
2000	Killeeshil	1-14	Owen Roes	0-07	05/08/00	Loughmacrory
2001	Dungannon	0-16	Killeeshil	1-10	01/09/01	Moy
2002	Gortin	2-10	Killyman	0-09	09/11/02	Rock
2003	Drumquin	1-09	Pomeroy	2-06	05/09/03	Greencastle
(r)	Drumquin	1-07	Pomeroy	0-04	13/09/03	Greencastle
2004	Greencastle	1-07	Drumquin	1-03	18/09/04	Omagh
2005	Derrylaughan	1-12	Greencastle	1-06	22/10/05	Pomeroy
2006	Eglish	3-07	Fintona	1-03	28/10/06	Galbally
2007	Fintona	0-13	Strabane	2-03	25/08/07	Newtownstewart
2008	Trillick	2-10	Pomeroy	2-07	12/11/08	Greencastle
2009	Strabane	3-16	Killyman	0-07	19/08/09	Killyclogher
2010	Eglish	1-13	Pomeroy	0-03	11/09/10	Donaghmore
2011	Gortin	0-08	Kildress	0-08	09/10/11	Pomeroy
(r)	Gortin	0-14	Kildress	1-10	12/11/11	Greencastle
2012	Pomeroy	2-10	Urney	1-09	10/11/12	Greencastle
2013	Pomeroy	4-13	Kildress	1-10	16/11/13	Cookstown
2014	Loughmacrory	1-10	Kildress	0-11	10/07/14	Greencastle
2015	Galbally	1-16	Cookstown	0-07	23/09/15	Stewartstown
2016	Donaghmore	2-14	Moortown	0-08	20/11/16	Brocagh
2017	Dungannon	2-15	Eglish	3-06	26/08/17	Edendork
2018	Greencastle	1-08	Moortown	0-06	11/08/18	Galbally
2019	Greencastle	2-08	Galbally	1-10	24/10/19	Eoghan Ruadh, Dungannon
2020	Moortown	1-10	Eglish	1-08	22/05/21	Pomeroy
2021	Kildress	0-10	Aghyaran	1-06	12/08/21	Newtownstewart
2022	Pomeroy	1-14	Eglish	1-10	18/08/22	Killeeshil
2023	Clonoe	0-14	Pomeroy	0-09	30/08/23	Coalisland
2024	Moy	0-09	Moortown	0-09	31/08/24	Eglish
	Moy won 5-3 on penalties, after extra time.					
2025	Clonoe	3-11	Coalisland	1-16	27/08/25	Stewartstown
2026	Cookstown	4-26	Derrylaughan	3-14	06/09/26	Brackaville

== List of Division 3 (Junior) finals ==
Year	Winner	Score	Opponent	Score	Date	Venue
1983	Drumragh	1-05	Loughmacrory	0-04	10/09/83	Beragh
1984	Strabane	0-08	Pomeroy	1-02	01/09/84	Omagh
1985	Drumragh	3-04	Urney	01-02	01/09/85	Omagh
1986	Newtownstewart	1-05	Killyman	0-02	23/08/86	Carrickmore
1987	Beragh	3-06	Castlederg	1-05	31/07/87	Omagh
1988	Beragh	1-03	Owen Roes	0-05	12/08/88	Omagh
1989	Drumragh	2-09	Urney	3-06	15/07/89	Drumquin
(r)	Drumragh	1-07	Urney	0-04	22/07/89	Drumquin
1990	Urney	2-05	Strabane	3-02	07/07/90	Glenmornan
(r)	Urney	2-07	Strabane	2-04	15/07/90	Glenmornan
1991	Newtownstewart	1-09	Aughabrack	0-06	31/08/91	Glenmornan
1992	Owen Roes	0-08	Fintona	0-03	25/07/92	Omagh
1993	Strabane	1-13	Rock	1-05	17/07/93	Omagh
1994	Aughabrack	0-09	Strabane	0-08	13/08/94	Dunamanagh
1995	Strabane	2-08	Glenelly	0-06	15/07/95	Dunamanagh
1996	Killeeshil	1-10	Owen Roes	0-08	06/07/96	Killyclogher
1997	Fintona	1-07	Owen Roes	1-06	26/07/97	Gortin
1998	Owen Roes	1-10	Rock	0-06	18/07/98	Carrickmore
1999	Drumragh	2-14	Clogher	0-08	16/08/99	Dromore
2000	Eskra	2-13	Clogher	1-05	19/08/00	Augher
2001	Castlederg	0-10	Newtownstewart	0-08	18/08/01	Drumquin
2002	Drumragh	1-11	Brocagh	2-01	11/07/02	Carrickmore
2003	Fintona	2-05	Eskra	2-05	09/09/03	Augher
(r)	Fintona	2-03	Eskra	0-08	20/09/03	Augher
2004	Fintona	4-03	Drumragh	1-06	18/09/04	Dromore
2005	Beragh	2-14	Urney	1-03	02/09/05	Killyclogher
2006	Beragh	0-11	Clogher	1-07	05/11/06	Fintona
2007	Brackaville	1-12	Tattyreagh	1-10	13/10/07	Killeeshil
2008	Errigal Ciaran	1-06	Strabane	2-02	11/10/08	Greencastle
2009	Brackaville	2-16	Beragh	1-03	12/09/09	Galbally
2010	Brackaville	0-11	Dungannon	0-06	09/10/10	Pomeroy
2011	Brackaville	1-12	Errigal Ciaran	1-07	08/10/11	Eoghan Ruadh, Dungannon
2012	Fintona	1-05	Brackaville	0-07	28/10/12	Killeeshil
2013	Loughmacrory	1-08	Tattyreagh	1-04	09/11/13	Killyclogher
2014	Tattyreagh	1-10	Clann Na nGael	0-12	07/09/14	Newtownstewart
2015	Glenelly	2-05	Fintona	2-04	27/09/15	Pomeroy
2016	Fintona	6-05	Killeeshil	3-09	03/12/16	Garvaghey
2017	Drumragh	3-14	Errigal Ciaran	1-05	22/10/17	Eskra
2018	Errigal Ciaran	1-11	Castlederg	0-09	10/08/18	Omagh
2019	Drumragh	0-12	Rock	0-06	16/11/19	Killyclogher
2020	No record of competition					
2021	Drumragh	1-11	Eskra	0-10	12/11/21	Fintona
2022	Stewartstown	3-13	Drumragh	1-13	25/08/22	Garvaghey
2023	Drumragh	4-11	Drumquin	0-06	21/10/23	Dromore
2024	Eskra	0-11	Killeeshil	0-08	29/09/24	Beragh
2025	Strabane	2-14	Tattyreagh	0-19	15/08/25	Newtownstewart
2026	Drumragh	0-15	Glenelly	0-07	20/09/26	Newtownstewart

== Division 1 (Senior) Reserve Championship titles listed by club, 1975–2026 ==
#	Club	Wins	Years won
1	Errigal Ciaran	11	1992, 1993, 2003, 2004, 2006, 2009, 2012, 2016, 2018, 2019, 2026
2	Dromore St. Dympna's	10	1979, 1982, 1983, 1988, 1989, 1998, 2011, 2015, 2020, 2022
3	Clonoe O'Rahilly's	6	2000, 2007, 2008, 2010, 2013, 2014
4	An Charraig Mhór Naomh Colmcille	5	1978, 1995, 1997, 1999, 2001
4	Ardboe O'Donovan Rossa	5	1975, 1976, 1985, 2002, 2005
6	Omagh St. Enda's	3	1984, 2017, 2025
7	Coalisland Na Fianna	2	1987, 1990
7	Dungannon Thomas Clarkes	2	1994, 1996
7	Killyclogher St. Mary's	2	2021, 2024
10	Ballygawley St. Ciaran's	1	1981
10	Donaghmore St. Patrick's	1	2023
10	Eglish St. Patrick's	1	1986
10	Fintona Pearses	1	1980
10	Moortown St. Malachy's	1	1991

== Division 2 (Intermediate) Reserve Championship titles listed by club, 1982–2026 ==
#	Club	Wins	Years won
1	Derrylaughan Kevin Barry's	3	1994, 1995, 2005
1	Gortin St. Patrick's	3	1998, 2002, 2011
1	Greencastle St. Patrick's	3	2004, 2018, 2019
1	Pomeroy Plunketts	3	2012, 2013, 2022
5	Beragh Red Knights	2	1984, 1985
5	Clonoe O'Rahilly's	2	2023, 2025
5	Coalisland Na Fianna	2	1982, 1983
5	Dungannon Thomas Clarkes	2	2001, 2017
5	Edendork St. Malachy's	2	1992, 1993
5	Eglish St. Patrick's	2	2006, 2010
5	Galbally Pearses	2	1990, 2015
5	Killeeshil St. Mary's	2	1999, 2000
5	Moortown St. Malachy's	2	1989, 2020
5	Strabane Sigerson's	2	1996, 2009
5	Trillick St. Macartan's	2	1997, 2008
16	Aughabrack O’Connells	1	1986
16	Cookstown Fr. Rock's	1	2026
16	Donaghmore St. Patrick's	1	2016
16	Drumquin Wolfe Tones	1	2003
16	Fintona Pearses	1	2007
16	Kildress Wolfe Tones	1	2021
16	Killyclogher St. Mary's	1	1987
16	Loughmacrory St. Teresa's	1	2014
16	Moy Tír na nÓg	1	2024
16	Stewartstown Harps	1	1988
16	Urney St. Columba's	1	1991

== Division 3 (Junior) Reserve Championship titles listed by club, 1983–2026 ==
#	Club	Wins	Years won
1	Drumragh Sarsfields	10	1983, 1985, 1989, 1999, 2002, 2017, 2019, 2021, 2023, 2026
2	Fintona Pearses	5	1997, 2003, 2004, 2012, 2016
3	Beragh Red Knights	4	1987, 1988, 2005, 2006
3	Brackaville Owen Roes	4	2007, 2009, 2010, 2011
3	Strabane Sigerson's	4	1984, 1993, 1995, 2025
6	Errigal Ciaran	2	2008, 2018
6	Eskra Emmetts	2	2000, 2024
6	Newtownstewart St. Eugene's	2	1986, 1991
6	Owen Roe O'Neill's	2	1992, 1998
10	Aughabrack O'Connell's	1	1994
10	Castlederg St. Eugene's	1	2001
10	Glenelly St. Joseph's	1	2015
10	Killeeshil St. Mary's	1	1996
10	Loughmacrory St. Teresa's	1	2013
10	Stewartstown Harps	1	2022
10	Tattyreagh St. Patrick's	1	2014
10	Urney St. Columba's	1	1990
