= Tyrone Senior Football Championship =

Annual Gaelic football competition

- Current season or competition: 2026 Tyrone Senior Football Championship
- Irish: Craobh Sinsear Peile Tír Eoghain
- Code: Gaelic football
- Founded: 1904
- Region: County Tyrone, Ulster (GAA)
- Trophy: O'Neill Cup
- No. of teams: 16
- Title holders: Edendork St. Malachy's (1st title)
- Most titles: An Charraig Mhór (15 titles)
- Sponsors: Connollys of Moy
- Official website: https://tyronegaa.ie/

The Tyrone Senior Football Championship (known for sponsorship reasons as the Connollys of Moy Tyrone Senior Football Championship) is an annual Gaelic football competition contested by top-tier Tyrone GAA clubs. The Tyrone County Board of the Gaelic Athletic Association has organised it since 1904.

In 2022, the Irish Independent said of the Tyrone SFC: "Tyrone can rightly lay claim to the most competitive senior football championship of them all just by the range of different winners it has produced over the last decade".

Edendork St. Malachy's are the title holders (2026), having defeated Errigal Ciarán in a replay of the final at Healy Park, Omagh on Friday 23 October 2026.

== History ==
To date, over 20 different clubs have won the Tyrone Senior Football Championship, though some of these no longer exist (including Washingbay Shamrocks, Cookstown Brian Óg, Fintona Davitts and Strabane Fág-a-Bealach).

The first tournament took place in the 1904–1905 season, which Coalisland Fianna won by defeating Strabane Lámh Dhearg in the final.

No competition was held in the 1906–1907, 1909–1913, 1914–1916, 1918–1919, or 1920–1923 seasons, nor in 1932. The 1939 competition was left unfinished.

An Charraig Mhór is the club that has won the competition the most times (15), their last in 2005. Dungannon have the second highest number of wins (11), with Coalisland in third place (10).

The 2024 Final was originally scheduled to be played on Sunday 20 October but was postponed due to Storm Ashley.

== Format ==
The 16 clubs in Division 1 of the All-County Football League in Tyrone compete on a straight knockout basis. Between 1999 and 2007, the competition was played for by 24 clubs. Reserve Football Championships are also played in the county at adult level for club's second teams.

== Honours ==
The trophy presented to the winners is the O'Neill Cup. The O'Neill Cup was received by the County Board in December 1926 at a cost of £20.4.0. The Cup was first played for in the 1927 season in which Donaghmore Éire Óg became the first winners.

The winners qualify to represent Tyrone in the Ulster Senior Club Football Championship. Errigal Ciarán are the only club from Tyrone to win the Ulster Club championship, which has happened three times (1993, 2002 and 2024).

The winners of Ulster go on to play in the All-Ireland Senior Club Football Championship. Errigal Ciaran became the first Tyrone team to reach an All-Ireland Senior Club Football Final when they beat Dr. Crokes (Kerry) in the 2025 All-Ireland Semi-Final. They were then beaten by Cuala (Dublin) 3-14 to 1-16 in the Final played at Croke Park.

== List of finals ==
(r) = replay

(aet) = after extra time

Year	Winner	Score	Opponent	Score	Date	Venue	Referee	Winning Captain
1904–5	Coalisland Fianna	3-07	Strabane Lámh Dhearg	0-01	11/12/04	Coalisland	J. Rice (Dungannon)	Joe Morrison
1905–6	Strabane Fág-a-Bealach	1-04	Donaghmore Éire Óg	0-04	16/04/06	Omagh	W.J. Bennett (Omagh)	
1906–7	No competition							
1907–8	Coalisland Fianna	0-05	Fintona Davitts	0-05	02/02/08	Sixmilecross	J. Greenan (Omagh)	
(r)	Coalisland Fianna	0-08	Fintona Davitts	0-02	20/09/08	Sixmilecross	J. McElvogue (Cookstown)	Joe Cullen
1908–9	Dungannon Craobh Ruadh	2-09	Fintona Davitts	0-05	15/08/09	Sixmilecross	J. McGillion (Sixmilecross)	Paddy Mallon
1909-13	No competition							
1913–14	Fintona Davitts	2-01	Coalisland Fianna	0-01	14/06/14	Sixmilecross		
1914–16	No competition							
1916–17	Cookstown Brian Óg	3-01	Kilskeery McDonagh's	2-01	15/07/17	Omagh	P. Holland (Dungannon)	Hughie Magee
1917-18	Cookstown Brian Óg	1-05	Omagh O'Neill's	1-03	18/08/18	Dungannon	P. Holland (Dungannon)	
(r) After Appeal	Cookstown Brian Óg	1-02	Omagh O'Neill's	1-01	22/09/18	Coalisland	Fr. J. McManus (Kiskeery)	Jimmy Boyd
1918–19	No competition							
1919–20	Moy Tír Na nÓg	2-02	Omagh Coleman's	1-01	30/05/20	Coalisland	S. O'Grady (Dungannon)	John Hegarty
1920-23	No competition							
1924	Stewartstown Harps	0-18	Omagh Coleman's	0-04	20/04/24	Donaghmore	F.H. Rodgers (Beragh)	Peter Mulgrew
1925	Dungannon Thomas Clarkes	4-04	Ballygawley St. Ciaran’s	1-01	30/08/25	Dungannon	P. Vallelly (Armagh)	Jimmy McIntosh
1926	Ballygawley St. Ciaran’s	2-02	Ardboe Pearses	0-03	24/04/27	Dungannon	T. Bradley (Coalisland)	Joe Higgins
1927	Donaghmore Éire Óg	1-07	Ardboe Pearses	0-09	18/12/27	Dungannon	J. McAnespie (Cookstown)	Johnny McCullagh
1928	Coalisland Fianna	2-04	Donaghmore Éire Óg	1-03	02/06/29	Dungannon	J. McAnespie (Cookstown)	Joe Henry Campbell
1929	Dungannon Thomas Clarkes	4-03	Coalisland Fianna	1-06	16/03/30	Dungannon	P. Corr (Ardboe)	Pat Barker
1930	Coalisland Fianna	1-02	Dungannon Thomas Clarkes	0-02	29/03/31	Dungannon		Joe Henry Campbell
1931	Ballygawley St. Ciaran’s	2-01	Washingbay Shamrocks	1-03	22/11/31	Dungannon	G. Nash (Belfast)	Barney Farrell
1932	No competition							
1933	Dungannon Thomas Clarkes	2-02	Omagh St. Enda's	2-01	29/10/33	Omagh	Fr. J. McGilligan (An Charraig Mhór)	Leo McMenemy
1934	Washingbay; Shamrocks	3-01	Omagh St. Enda's	1-04	09/12/34	Dungannon	T. Bradley (Coalisland)	Joe Kilpatrick
1935	Dungannon Thomas Clarkes	2-05	Omagh St. Enda's	2-01	09/02/36	Altamuskin	P. Coleman (Fintona)	John McQuaid
1936	Dungannon Thomas Clarkes	1-04	An Charraig Mhór Naomh Colmcille	0-04	11/04/37	Pomeroy	J. McMahon (Beragh)	John McQuaid
1937	Trillick St. Macartan's	2-08	Donaghmore St. Joseph's	0-02	05/12/37	Omagh	Fr. J. Murphy (Kildress)	Tommy McSorley
1938	Fintona Pearses	0-03	Cookstown Fr. Rock's	0-00	16/04/39	Dungannon	Fr. J. McGilligan (An Charraig Mhór)	
1939	Competition unfinished							
1940	An Charraig Mhór Naomh Colmcille	1-04	Dungannon Thomas Clarkes	2-01	09/03/41	Pomeroy	Fr. T. Kirk (Trillick)	
(r)	An Charraig Mhór Naomh Colmcille	1-05	Dungannon Thomas Clarkes	0-05	20/04/41	Pomeroy	M. McAvinchey (Armagh)	Michael McElduff
1941	Moortown St. Malachy's	1-05	Clonoe O'Rahilly's	0-06	19/04/42	Coalisland	Fr. P. Hughes (Pomeroy)	Peter Crozier
1942	Moortown St. Malachy's	2-05	Omagh St. Enda's	0-01	25/10/42	Pomeroy	Fr. E. Devlin (Donaghmore)	Peter Crozier
1943	An Charraig Mhór Naomh Colmcille	4-03	Moortown St. Malachy's	0-04	12/09/43	Omagh	P. Gallagher (Omagh)	Michael McElduff
1944	Dungannon Thomas Clarkes	2-02	Moortown St. Malachy's	0-03	17/09/44	Coalisland	P. Gallagher (Omagh)	John McQuaid
1945	Strabane Lámh Dhearg	3-11	Dungannon Thomas Clarkes	4-04	09/09/45	Omagh	P. Gallagher (Omagh)	Frank Harte
1946	Coalisland Fianna	1-06	Dromore St.Dympna's	0-03	08/09/46	Pomeroy	J. Magee (Strabane)	John Doris
1947	Dungannon Thomas Clarkes	2-06	Moortown St. Malachy's	1-02	23/11/47	Dungannon	J. Monaghan (Ederney)	P.K. O'Neill
1948	Omagh St. Enda's	1-03	Clogher Éire Óg	0-02	28/11/48	Dromore	J. McKee (Portadown)	Eugene O'Brien
1949	An Charraig Mhór Naomh Colmcille	4-01	Derrytresk Fir An Chnoic	0-06	23/10/49	Pomeroy	J. McKee (Portadown)	Jim McElduff
1950	Moortown St. Malachy's	1-06	Dungannon Thomas Clarkes	2-01	22/10/50	Coalisland	L. Friel (Belfast)	Tommy Curran
1951	Dungannon Thomas Clarkes	3-09	Moortown St. Malachy's	0-01	25/11/51	Pomeroy	O. Slane (An Charraig Mhór)	Iggy Jones
1952	Omagh St. Enda's	2-04	Clonoe O'Rahilly's	1-01	19/10/52	Dungannon	D. McGarvey (Armagh)	Eugene O'Brien
1953	Omagh St. Enda's	3-06	Clonoe O'Rahilly's	2-03	31/08/53	Pomeroy	O. Slane (Beragh)	Donal Donnelly
1954	Omagh St. Enda's	1-08	Dungannon Thomas Clarkes	0-05	05/09/54	Pomeroy	O. Slane (Beragh)	Thaddy Thurbett
1955	Coalisland Fianna	2-06	Dungannon Thomas Clarkes	2-04	18/09/55	Pomeroy	P. Hughes (Derrylaughan)	Jim Devlin
1956	Dungannon Thomas Clarkes	2-06	Clonoe O'Rahilly's	1-05	21/10/56	Pomeroy	F. Kelly (Ballygawley)	Dr. Tommy Campbell
1957	Omagh St. Enda's	1-07	Derrylaughan Kevin Barry's	0-03	06/10/57	Pomeroy	T. Flanagan (Monaghan)	Harry Scully
1958	Clonoe O'Rahilly's	1-05	An Charraig Mhór Naomh Colmcille	1-03	07/09/58	Dungannon	J. Harte (Dungannon)	Brian Bannigan
1959	Clonoe O'Rahilly's	w/o	Omagh St. Enda's	did not field	06/12/59			Seamus O'Neill
1960	Clonoe O'Rahilly's	2-07	Donaghmore St. Patrick's	2-00	04/09/60	Dungannon	P. Devlin (Omagh)	Seamus O'Neill
1961	An Charraig Mhór Naomh Colmcille	2-05	Moy Tír Na nÓg	0-05	03/09/61	Pomeroy	J.J. Kelly (Moortown)	Peadar Montague
1962	Stewartstown Harps	3-03	Derrylaughan Kevin Barry's	0-03	09/09/62	Dungannon	J. Martin (Omagh)	Paddy McNally
1963	Omagh St. Enda's	2-10	Galbally Pearses	0-05	01/09/63	Dungannon	J. Harte (Dungannon)	Paddy Corey
1964	Clonoe O'Rahilly's	2-05	Derrylaughan Kevin Barry's	0-04	20/09/64	Dungannon	J. Martin (Omagh)	Harry Donnelly
1965	Clonoe O'Rahilly's	1-09	Derrylaughan Kevin Barry's	2-06	29/08/65	Coalisland	P. Devlin (Omagh)	
(r)	Clonoe O'Rahilly's	0-10	Derrylaughan Kevin Barry's	0-03	19/09/65	Coalisland	P. Devlin (Omagh)	John McCabe
1966	An Charraig Mhór Naomh Colmcille	0-10	Derrylaughan Kevin Barry's	0-04	28/08/66	Dungannon	W. Melly (Urney)	Oliver Kerr
1967	Derrylaughan Kevin Barry's	0-09	An Charraig Mhór Naomh Colmcille	0-06	17/09/67	Dungannon	S. Faloon (Donaghmore)	Mena Devlin
1968	Ardboe O'Donovan Rossa	1-08	Coalisland Fianna	0-07	15/09/68	Dungannon	P. Devlin (Omagh)	Patsy Forbes
1969	An Charraig Mhór Naomh Colmcille	1-10	Coalisland Fianna	1-09	31/08/69	Dungannon	J. Heaney (Beragh)	Oliver Kerr
1970	Eglish St. Patrick's	2-07	Augher St. Macartan's	1-08	13/09/70	Dungannon	J. Martin (Omagh)	Brian Daly
1971	Ardboe O'Donovan Rossa	2-09	An Charraig Mhór Naomh Colmcille	1-09	05/09/71	Dungannon	M. Devlin (Derrylaughan)	Patsy Forbes
1972	Ardboe O'Donovan Rossa	1-09	Stewartstown Harps	1-04	01/10/72	Dungannon	G. McCabe (Clonoe)	Colm O'Neill
1973	Ardboe O'Donovan Rossa	2-06	Augher St. Macartan's	1-04	30/12/73	Pomeroy	M. Devlin (Derrylaughan)	Kevin Teague
1974	Trillick St. Macartan's	1-09	An Charraig Mhór Naomh Colmcille	1-03	15/09/74	Omagh	S. Glackin (Cookstown)	Joe McGrade
1975	Trillick St. Macartan's	1-11	Owen Roe O'Neill's	2-03	31/08/75	Omagh	P. Devlin (Omagh)	Barney McAnespy
1976	Augher St. Macartan's	3-04	Ardboe O'Donovan Rossa	1-07	29/08/76	Dungannon	J. Heaney (Beragh)	Dessie McKenna
1977	An Charraig Mhór Naomh Colmcille	0-11	Dromore St. Dympna's	1-07	18/09/77	Omagh	P. Lynn (Toome)	John Keenan
1978	An Charraig Mhór Naomh Colmcille	1-06	Dromore St. Dympna's	0-04	10/09/78	Omagh	B. Taggart (Clonoe)	John Keenan
1979	An Charraig Mhór Naomh Colmcille	0-08	Fintona Pearses	1-04	26/08/79	Omagh	S. Corr (Coalisland)	John Keenan
1980	Trillick St. Macartan's	0-07	Omagh St. Enda's	1-04	31/08/80	Carrickmore	J.P. Dorrity (Stewartstown)	
(r)	Trillick St. Macartan's	1-06	Omagh St. Enda's	0-06	14/09/80	Carrickmore	J.P. Dorrity (Stewartstown)	Patsy Kelly
1981	Derrylaughan Kevin Barry's	2-03	An Charraig Mhór Naomh Colmcille	1-05	27/09/81	Dungannon	P. Quinn (Killyclogher)	Gerry Taggart
1982	Augher St. Macartan's	2-06	Dromore St. Dympna's	1-05	29/08/82	Carrickmore	F. Campbell (Pomeroy)	Paul Donnelly
1983	Trillick St. Macartan's	1-09	Ardboe O'Donovan Rossa	0-08	21/08/83	Carrickmore	E. Mullan (Ballygawley)	Pat King
1984	Ardboe O'Donovan Rossa	0-08	Omagh St. Enda's	0-07	26/08/84	Dungannon	E. Mullan (Ballygawley)	Hugh Bell
1985	Augher St. Macartan's	0-08	Gortin St. Patrick's	0-03	25/08/85	Carrickmore	L. Duffy (Cookstown)	Gerry Daly
1986	Trillick St. Macartan's	0-08	Dungannon Thomas Clarkes	0-08	28/09/86	Pomeroy	S. Corr (Coalisland)	
(r)	Trillick St. Macartan's	1-10	Dungannon Thomas Clarkes	2-05	05/10/86	Pomeroy	S. Corr (Coalisland)	Liam Donnelly
1987	Ardboe O'Donovan Rossa	0-09	Trillick St. Macartan's	1-06	13/09/87	Pomeroy	E. Mullan (Ballygawley)	
(r)	Ardboe O'Donovan Rossa	1-06	Trillick St. Macartan's	0-05	27/09/87	Pomeroy	E. Mullan (Ballygawley)	Stephen Coney
1988	Omagh St. Enda's	2-06	Clonoe O'Rahilly's	2-04	28/08/88	Dungannon	C. Donnelly (Aghaloo)	Paddy Quinn
1989	Coalisland Fianna	1-11	Ballygawley St. Ciaran’s	0-06	27/08/89	Omagh	P. Corrigan (Urney)	Martin O'Neill
1990	Coalisland Fianna	4-06	Omagh St. Enda's	2-07	29/07/90	Carrickmore	J. Curran (Ardboe)	Damian O'Hagan
1991	Clonoe O'Rahilly's	1-13	Coalisland Fianna	1-06	18/08/91	Edendork	D. Slater (Dungannon)	Martin McStravick
1992	Moortown St. Malachy's	2-06	Dromore St. Dympna's	0-05	13/09/92	Carrickmore	D. Slater (Dungannon)	James Devlin
1993	Errigal Ciarán	0-11	Moortown St. Malachy's	0-10	29/08/93	Edendork	D. Slater (Dungannon)	Peter Canavan
1994	Errigal Ciarán	3-05	An Charraig Mhór Naomh Colmcille	1-08	28/08/94	Omagh	B. Taggart (Clonoe)	Peter Canavan
1995	An Charraig Mhór Naomh Colmcille	1-08	Moortown St. Malachy's	0-05	17/12/95	Coalisland	M. Hughes (Donaghmore)	Raymond Munroe
1996	An Charraig Mhór Naomh Colmcille	2-08	Errigal Ciarán	1-09	29/09/96	Omagh	J. Curran (Ardboe)	Damian Loughran
1997	Errigal Ciarán	1-14	Galbally Pearses	2-05	21/09/97	Edendork	J. Curran (Ardboe)	Hugh Quinn
1998	Ardboe O'Donovan Rossa	0-11	Omagh St. Enda's	0-08	13/09/98	Pomeroy	M. Kolbohm (Rock)	Fay Devlin
1999	An Charraig Mhór Naomh Colmcille	1-10	Killyclogher St. Mary's	1-06	19/09/99	Omagh	M. Hughes (Donaghmore)	Ronan McGarrity
2000	Errigal Ciarán	0-11	An Charraig Mhór Naomh Colmcille	1-08	03/09/00	Omagh	M. Hughes (Donaghmore)	
(r)	Errigal Ciarán	1-10	An Charraig Mhór Naomh Colmcille	0-09	17/09/00	Omagh	M. Kolbohm (Rock)	Colm McCann
2001	An Charraig Mhór Naomh Colmcille	1-07	Errigal Ciarán	0-09	16/09/01	Omagh	D. O'Neill (Derrylaughan)	Davitt McElroy
2002	Errigal Ciarán	1-09	Killyclogher St. Mary's	1-07	29/09/02	Omagh	J. Kerlin (Clann Na nGael)	Eoin Gormley
2003	Killyclogher St. Mary's	2-06	Errigal Ciarán	1-07	19/10/03	Omagh	K. Kelly (Kildress)	Brian Meenan
2004	An Charraig Mhór Naomh Colmcille	1-13	Dromore St. Dympna's	1-09	10/10/04	Omagh	M. Mohan (Eglish)	Peter Loughran
2005	An Charraig Mhór Naomh Colmcille	1-06	Omagh St. Enda's	1-05	23/10/05	Omagh	M. Sludden (Dromore)	Brian Gormley
2006	Errigal Ciarán	0-12	An Charraig Mhór Naomh Colmcille	1-09	24/09/06	Omagh	M. Hughes (Donaghmore)	
(r)	Errigal Ciarán	1-08	An Charraig Mhór Naomh Colmcille	0-08	08/10/06	Omagh	M. Mohan (Eglish)	Peter Canavan
2007	Dromore St. Dympna's	0-14	Coalisland Fianna	0-04	14/10/07	Omagh	S. McNamee (Newtownstewart)	Fabian O'Neill
2008	Clonoe O'Rahilly's	0-10	Dromore St. Dympna's	0-09	26/10/08	Omagh	M. Mohan (Eglish)	Colm Donnelly
2009	Dromore St. Dympna's	1-14	Ardboe O'Donovan Rossa	1-13	18/10/09	Omagh	S. Quinn (Brackaville)	Colm McCullagh
2010	Coalisland Fianna	0-09	An Charraig Mhór Naomh Colmcille	0-07	24/10/10	Omagh	E. McHugh (Aghyaran)	Plunkett Kane
2011	Dromore St. Dympna's	1-08	Clonoe O'Rahilly's	2-04	23/10/11	Omagh	E. McHugh (Aghyaran) / E. McConnell (Clogher)	Eoin McCusker
2012	Errigal Ciarán	0-13	Dromore St. Dympna's	0-08	07/10/12	Omagh	C. O'Hagan (Brackaville)	Enda McGinley
2013	Clonoe O'Rahilly's	3-08	An Charraig Mhór Naomh Colmcille	0-12	13/10/13	Omagh	M. Sludden (Dromore)	Stephen McNulty
2014	Omagh St. Enda's	1-10	An Charraig Mhór Naomh Colmcille	0-12	28/09/14	Omagh	S. Hurson (Galbally)	Hugh Gallagher
2015	Trillick St. Macartan's	1-09	Killyclogher St. Mary's	0-11	11/10/15	Omagh	J. McElroy (Aghaloo)	Matthew Donnelly
2016	Killyclogher St. Mary's	0-16	Coalisland Fianna	1-13	09/10/16	Omagh	S. Hurson (Galbally)	
(r)	Killyclogher St. Mary's	0-20	Coalisland Fianna	0-06	21/10/16	Omagh	F. Ward (Errigal Ciaran)	Martin Swift
2017	Omagh St. Enda's	0-10	Errigal Ciarán	0-08	15/10/17	Omagh	S. Dorrity (Coalisland)	Joe McMahon / Connor O'Donnell
2018	Coalisland Fianna	2-11	Killyclogher St. Mary's	1-07	21/10/18	Omagh	S. Hurson (Galbally)	Stephen McNally
2019	Trillick St. Macartan's	0-12	Errigal Ciarán	2-04	13/10/19	Omagh	E. McHugh (Aghyaran)	Stephen O'Donnell
2020	Dungannon Thomas Clarkes†	1-12 (aet)†	Trillick St. Macartan's	1-12 (aet)	20/09/20	Omagh	S. Meehan (Glenelly)	Padraig McNulty
2021	Dromore St. Dympna's	0-15	Coalisland Fianna	0-08	14/11/21	Omagh	K. Eanetta (Omagh)	Conor O'Hara
2022	Errigal Ciarán	2-11	An Charraig Mhór Naomh Colmcille	1-12	30/10/22	Omagh	S. Campbell (Stewartstown)	Tommy Canavan
2023	Trillick St. Macartan's	1-13 (aet)	Errigal Ciarán	0-13 (aet)	29/10/23	Omagh	C. Forbes (Ardboe)	Rory Brennan
2024	Errigal Ciarán	0-12	Trillick St. Macartan's	1-08	25/10/24	Omagh	S. Hurson (Galbally)	Darragh Canavan
2025	Loch Mhic Ruairí Naomh Treasa	0-18	Trillick St. Macartan's	2-11	26/10/25	Omagh	M. Loughran (Errigal Ciaran)	Nathan Kelly
2026	Edendork St Malachy's	0-15	Errigal Ciarán	1-12	18/10/26	Omagh	P. Gallagher (Castlederg)	
(r)	Edendork St Malachy's	1-14	Errigal Ciarán	1-13	23/10/26	Omagh	C. Forbes (Ardboe)	Conor Mallon

Notes

† 2020: Dungannon won 8–7 on penalties, after extra time.

== Wins listed by club ==
#	Club	Wins	Years won
1	Carrickmore	15	1940, 1943, 1949, 1961, 1966, 1969, 1977, 1978, 1979, 1995, 1996, 1999, 2001, 2004, 2005
2	Dungannon	11	1908–9, 1925, 1929, 1933, 1935, 1936, 1944, 1947, 1951, 1956, 2020
3	Coalisland	10	1904–05, 1907–08, 1928, 1930, 1946, 1955, 1989, 1990, 2010, 2018
4	Errigal Ciarán	9	1993, 1994, 1997, 2000, 2002, 2006, 2012, 2022, 2024
4	Trillick	9	1937, 1974, 1975, 1980, 1983, 1986, 2015, 2019, 2023
4	Omagh	9	1948, 1952, 1953, 1954, 1957, 1963, 1988, 2014, 2017
7	Clonoe	8	1958, 1959, 1960, 1964, 1965, 1991, 2008, 2013
8	Ardboe	7	1968, 1971, 1972, 1973, 1984, 1987, 1998
9	Dromore	4	2007, 2009, 2011, 2021
9	Moortown	4	1941, 1942, 1950, 1992
11	Augher	3	1976, 1982, 1985
12	Killyclogher	2	2003, 2016
12	Derrylaughan	2	1967, 1981
12	Stewartstown	2	1924, 1962
12	Strabane	2	1905–6, 1945
12	Fintona	2	1913–14, 1938
12	Cookstown	2	1916-17, 1917-18
12	Ballygawley	2	1926, 1931
19	Loch Mhic Ruairí	1	2025
19	Edendork	1	2026
19	Eglish	1	1970
19	Washingbay	1	1934
19	Donaghmore	1	1927
19	Moy	1	1919–20

== Top Scorer ==
The contest for Top Scorer in the Senior Championship goes back to 1981 when it was sponsored by 'On The Spot Trophies', on the initiative of the late Plunkett McCusker.

In 1992 three times winner Tommy Fiddis became the permanent holder of the 'On the Spot' Top Scorer Trophy.

Subsequently in 1993 a new sponsor was recruited by the County Board - Forbes Kitchens of Ardboe.

The trophy is presented by Patsy Forbes each year on County Final day to that season's Senior Championship Top Scorer.

Peter Canavan has won the trophy a record 5 times - 1994, 1995, 2000, 2002 and 2006.

There have been joint winners in 3 different seasons - 1985, 1999 and 2001.

Year	Player	Club	Total
1981	Tommy Fiddis	Dromore	0-13 (13 points)
1982	Tommy Fiddis	Dromore	2-18 (24 points)
1983	John Joe O'Neill	Moortown	1-19 (22 points)
1984	Paul McAnea	Omagh	0-14 (14 points)
1985	Paul Donnelly	Augher	1-13 (16 points)
1985	Liam O'Reilly	Gortin	2-10 (16 points)
1986	Jody Kelly	Dungannon	2-15 (21 points)
1987	Stephen Coney	Ardboe	3-12 (21 points)
1988	Kevin McCabe	Clonoe	4-19 (31 points)
1989	Paddy McShane	Coalisland	2-20 (26 points)
1990	Paddy McShane	Coalisland	4-14 (26 points)
1991	Kevin McCabe	Clonoe	0-26 (26 points)
1992	Tommy Fiddis	Dromore	2-26 (32 points)
1993	Eamon McCaffrey	Errigal Ciaran	0-26 (26 points)
1994	Peter Canavan	Errigal Ciaran	3-27 (36 points)
1995	Peter Canavan	Errigal Ciaran	1-36 (39 points)
1996	Peter Loughran	An Charraig Mhór	3-16 (25 points)
1997	Eoin Gormley	Errigal Ciaran	0-19 (19 points)
1998	Frank McGuigan	Ardboe	0-23 (23 points)
1999	Frank McGuigan	Ardboe	1-21 (24 points)
1999	Colm McCullagh	Dromore	2-18 (24 points)
2000	Peter Canavan	Errigal Ciaran	4-28 (40 points)
2001	Adrian Cush	Donaghmore	0-27 (27 points)
2001	Brian McGuckin	Edendork	3-18 (27 points)
2002	Peter Canavan	Errigal Ciaran	3-20 (29 points)
2003	Leo Meenan	Killyclogher	2-20 (26 points)
2004	Stephen O'Neill	Clann Na nGael	0-30 (30 points)
2005	Cathal McCarron	Omagh	2-19 (25 points)
2006	Peter Canavan	Errigal Ciaran	2-23 (29 points)
2007	Shaun O'Neill	Dromore	1-14 (17 points)
2008	Eoin McCusker	Dromore	3-10 (19 points)
2009	Colm McCullagh	Dromore	2-18 (24 points)
2010	Kevin McNally	An Charraig Mhór	1-19 (22 points)
2011	Eoin McCusker	Dromore	2-21 (27 points)
2012	Eoin McCusker	Dromore	2-15 (21 points)
2013	Connor McAliskey	Clonoe	1-18 (21 points)
2014	Ronan O'Neill	Omagh	4-15 (27 points)
2015	Lee Brennan	Trillick	2-27 (33 points)
2016	Mark Bradley	Killyclogher	0-30 (30 points)
2017	Lee Brennan	Trillick	1-25 (28 points)
2018	Shea McGuigan	Ardboe	3-11 (20 points)
2019	Darren McCurry	Edendork	1-22 (25 points)
2020	Paul Donaghy	Dungannon	0-34 (34 points)
2021	Emmett McNabb	Dromore	0-22 (22 points)
2022	Darragh Canavan	Errigal Ciaran	0-20 (20 points)
2023	Paul Donaghy	Dungannon	1-21 (24 points)
2024	Ruairí Canavan	Errigal Ciaran	0-24 (24 points)
2025	Ruairi McCullagh	Loch Mhic Ruairí	0-27 (27 points)
2026	Darren McCurry	Edendork	1-29 (32 points)
