= Dungannon Thomas Clarkes GAC =

Tyrone-based Gaelic games club

Dungannon Thomas Clarkes
- Dún Geanainn Thomáis Uí Cleirigh
- Founded: 1917
- County: Tyrone
- Colours: Green and gold
- Grounds: O'Neill Park, Dungannon
- Coordinates: 54°30′30.54″N 6°47′12.94″W

Playing kits
Standard colours

Senior Club Championships
	All Ireland	Ulster champions	Tyrone champions
Football:	0	0	11

Dungannon Thomas Clarkes (in Irish 'Dún Geanainn Thomáis Uí Cleirigh') is a Gaelic Athletic Association club based in the town of Dungannon in County Tyrone, Northern Ireland. They play at O'Neill Park in Dungannon, which is also the second home of Tyrone G.A.A.

The club has won 11 senior football championships and 4 intermediate football championships.

== History ==
Dungannon Thomas Clarkes GFC (Cumann Thomáis Uí Chléirigh Dún Geanainn) was formed in 1917 and is named after one of the executed leaders of the 1916 Easter Rising, Thomas J Clarke, who spent his formative years living in Dungannon. The club colours are green, white and yellow.

O'Neill Park has been the home of the Clarkes since 1947. It was the first GAA owned pitch in Tyrone and represented at the time a growing confidence in the GAA in its ability to develop and organise Gaelic games. A new pavilion was opened in 1967 and was destroyed in a bomb attack on the club in 1971. The clubrooms were rebuilt in 1981 and replaced the bombed building. The current clubhouse was built in 2023 as part of a major development plan which also seen floodlights added in 2024. The spectator stand was added to the club facilities on the site of the old clubrooms in the late 1980s. Recent development work has made further improvements to the ground which is still regarded by many as the best venue in Tyrone for atmosphere at a big game.

Club players Iggy Jones, Gerald Cavlan, Audi Hamilton, Danny Barr & Brendan Mallon have all won Ulster senior championship medals with Tyrone. Gerald Cavlan & Paul Donaghy are the only players in the club's history to win the All Ireland Senior inter county football championship with Tyrone, Cavlan winning in 2003, and Donaghy in 2021.

Dungannon have always been well known for having strong industrial development teams winning both Grade 1 and Grade 2 trophies at Youth Level notably the U-14 Double, with a lot of the players moving into the senior team between 2021 and 2024.

== Achievements ==
- Tyrone Senior Football Championship: (11)
  - 1909, 1925, 1929, 1933, 1935, 1936, 1944, 1947, 1951, 1956, 2020
- Tyrone Intermediate Football Championship: (4)
  - 1963, 1972, 2001, 2014
- Tyrone Junior Football Championship: (1)
  - 1931
- Tyrone All-County Football League Division 1 (1)
  - 2024
- All-Ireland Football 7's (Kilmacud): (1)
  - 2024
- Tyrone Senior Reserve Football Championship: (2)
  - 1994, 1996
- Tyrone U-21 Football Championship: (2)
  - 1980, 1995
- Tyrone Minor Football Championship: (10)
  - 1962, 1963, 1966, 1973, 1976, 1980, 1984, 1989, 1993, 1994
- Ulster Minor Football Championship: (1)
  - 1989
- Tyrone U-16 Football Championship: (11)
  - 1961, 1962, 1971, 1972, 1981, 1984, 1987, 1989, 1990, 1991, 1994
- Tyrone U-15 Óg Sport: (4)
  - 1978, 1981, 1984, 1991
- Tyrone U-14 Féile Peile na nÓg: (4)
  - 1983, 1987, 1989, 2015
- Tyrone U-14 Football Championship (1996 Onwards): (3)
  - 2001, 2015, 2017
- Tyrone Minor Football Championship (Grade 2): (1)
  - 2024
- Tyrone U-16 Football Championship (Grade 2): (5)
  - 1999, 2000, 2010, 2014, 2024

== Notable players ==
- Gerard Cavlan
- Iggy Jones
