= Dromore St Dympna's GFC =

Tyrone-based Gaelic games club

Dromore St Dympna's
- An Droim Mhór Naoimh Damhnata
- Founded: 1933
- County: Tyrone
- Nickname: St Dympna's, Blues
- Colours: Blue & White
- Grounds: Gardrum Park
- Coordinates: 54°30′59.72″N 7°27′02.11″W

Playing kits
| Standard colours | Second colours |

Senior Club Championships
| | All Ireland | Ulster champions | Tyrone champions |
|---|---|---|---|
| Football: | 0 | 0 | 4 |

Dromore St Dympna's is a Gaelic Athletic Association club based in the village of Dromore in County Tyrone, Northern Ireland.

== History ==
The club was established in 1933.

On Sunday 14 October 2007, Dromore made history by winning the Tyrone Senior Football Championship for the first time by beating Coalisland 0-14 to 0-4 at Healy Park, Omagh.

On Sunday 18 October 2009, Dromore won their second Tyrone Senior Football Championship by beating Ardboe 1-14 to 1-13. Captain Colm McCullagh converted a penalty three minutes into injury time in dramatic circumstances at Healy Park Omagh.

== Achievements ==
- Tyrone Senior Football Championship: (4)
  - 2007, 2009, 2011, 2021
- Tyrone Intermediate Football Championship: (1)
  - 1975
- Tyrone Junior Football Championship: (1)
  - 1963

== Notable players ==
- Ryan McMenamin
- Niall Sludden
- Colm McCullagh
