= Edendork St Malachy's GAC =

Tyrone-based Gaelic games club

Edendork St Malachy's
- Éadán na dTorc Naomh Maoileachlainn
- Founded: 1932
- County: Tyrone
- Colours: Green and Gold hoops
- Grounds: Páirc Arthur Mallon
- Coordinates: 54°31′20.31″N 6°45′35.37″W

Playing kits
Standard colours

Edendork St Malachy's is a GAA club based in Edendork, in the town of Dungannon in County Tyrone, Northern Ireland.

== History ==
The history of the G.A.A. in Edendork can be traced back much further than 1932, the year in which the present St Malachy's club was formed.

Indeed, it was only three years after the formation of the Gaelic Athletic Association that the game was first played in Edendork. The year was 1887, and the match was probably the first ever in Tyrone.

After a lapse of a few years, Gaelic football was revived at the turn of the century and continued sporadically though fervently for some thirty years at various locations in the district.

Then in 1932 the present St Malachy's GFC was founded by Larry Fox and immediately joined the East Tyrone Junior League.

In 1936, Edendork won the league for the first time and reached the final of the East Tyrone Junior Championship, which they lost to Cookstown Brian Ogs. The following year they made it two league titles in a row, and made it a hit-trick in 1938, when they also won their first Tyrone title, the Junior Championship.

The club won the league again in 1946, before clinching another three-in-a-row of East Tyrone Junior League titles in 1950, 1951 and 1952.

Edendork entered senior football for the first time the following season, and also fielded a hurling team. It was back to Junior, however, in 1957, as emigration robbed the club of many of its leading players, but Edendork immediately made an impact by winning the Tyrone Junior Championship.

Edendork returned to senior football with a vengeance in 1958, just failing to reach the senior championship final in a thrilling semi-final against a Frankie Donnelly-inspired Carrickmore.

There was little in the way of success for the next eight years, in fact the club dropped back into Junior football; but in 1966 the team bounced back to Intermediate football with an unbeaten run to lift the league title.

Edendork's greatest success came in 1969, when they won the Intermediate Championship, and two years later the club's camogie team won the Tyrone league.

Two of Edendork's rising stars, Hugh Mooney and Kieran Currie won All-Ireland minor medals with Tyrone in 1973, both playing vital roles in an historic victory.

In 1976, the camogie team achieved its greatest triumph by winning the Tyrone Senior Championship.

Three years later, success returned on the field of play and Edendork lifted their second Intermediate Championship title and returned to senior football as double champions, having won the league as well.

In the following season, two of the club's members played in the All-Ireland Final against Kerry at Croke Park.

The Mallon brothers, Joe and Mickey, were members of the Tyrone team which came so close to bringing the Sam Maguire Cup home.

Their clubhouse was burnt down on 8 November 2008.

On 19 July 2020, the club named stalwart Ronan Maneely vice-captain (VC) of the reserve team for the upcoming 2020 Tyrone GAA Division II season.

== Achievements ==
- Tyrone Senior Football Championship: (1)
  - 2026
- Tyrone Intermediate Football Championship: (4)
  - 1969, 1985, 2015, 2020
- Tyrone Junior Football Championship: (2)
  - 1938, 1957

== Notable players ==
- Darren McCurry
- Niall Morgan
