= Donaghmore St Patrick's GAC =

Tyrone-based Gaelic games club

Donaghmore St Patrick's GAA
- Domhnach Mór Naomh Pádraig CLG
- Founded: 1903
- County: Tyrone
- Nickname: The pats Village
- Colours: Blue & gold
- Grounds: Park
- Coordinates: 54°32′01.88″N 6°48′41.59″W

Playing kits
Senior	Reserve

Senior Club Championships
	All Ireland	Ulster champions	Tyrone champions
Football:	-	-	1

Donaghmore St Patrick's is a Gaelic Athletic Association club based in the village of Donaghmore in County Tyrone, Northern Ireland. They play in blue and gold colours.

== History ==
=== Foundation and early years ===
Donaghmore Éire Óg was formed on 26 December 1903 by a group led by Cathal O'Toole, the first Gaelic Football Club in the parish of Donaghmore, influenced by the nearby Dungannon Emmetts. O'Toole was appointed President and Captain, with John O'Neill (Drumbearn) as Vice-President and Vice Captain. Edward Carberry became Treasurer, and William Cunningham Secretary, while the first committee consisted of James McCann, John O'Neill (Donaghmore), Joe Carberry, Joseph Daly, Joseph Brannigan and Henry Daly.

The name Éire Óg (Young Ireland) was chosen by O'Toole, a frequent contributor to the weekly Young Ireland column of the Ulster Herald newspaper. The new club aimed to celebrate Irish culture, so the Gaelic football team was followed by a hurling team and a literary section. O'Toole urged others to follow the example of Dungannon and Donaghmore so that Tyrone would "soon be ablaze with enthusiasm for the revival of our national games and pastimes". The chosen colours of Donaghmore Éire Óg were green jerseys with a gold sash, and they played their first match in Coalisland against Coalisland Fianna on Sunday 17 April 1904, with Coalisland winning 2–6 to 0–3.

On 18 December 1927, led by team captain Johnny McCullough, Donaghmore GAA won the 1927 Tyrone Senior Championship Final, beating Ardboe Pearses 1–7 to 0–9 in Dungannon, the year that the event was awarded by the O'Neill Cup for the first time.

Father Eamon Devlin was appointed as curate for the Donaghmore area in October 1941, where he stayed for most of his clerical life until 1969. Under Devlin's guidance, a meeting was held on 26 January 1944, which resulted in the renaming of the club to its current name of Donaghmore St Patrick's. The team won the East Tyrone League in 1946, and again in 1952. In 1954, Donaghmore won the Tyrone Junior Championship, and again won the East Tyrone League in 1957. In 1959, Donaghmore achieved their first success at Grade One level, winning the U-16 Championship.

=== 1960s onwards ===
The beginning of the 1960s to the end of the 1980s saw significant changes for Donaghmore GFC. The Senior team saw both relegation and promotion in the 1960s, winning the Intermediate Championships in 1965 and 1968. A Youth Club was established in 1964, and the club won the Minor Grade 1 Championship in 1967. On 25 May 1974 a new playing field opened, named Fr Eamon Devlin Park in honour of Devlin's contribution to the club, with a challenge game between Tyrone and Mayo to mark the occasion. In 1978, Denise McMullan won an All-Ireland title in Scór na nÓg in the recitation section.

The Senior team finished third in the All-County League in 1982 and reached the semi-finals of the Senior Championship. However, the next few years saw Donaghmore struggle to keep senior status, being relegated in 1985, winners of the 1986 Tyrone ACL Division 2 title, and runners up in the 1986 Intermediate Championship Final, losing after a replay. The club's Under-14's took the All-Ireland title in 1988, with the Senior team winning the Intermediate Championship in the same year, defeating Brockagh 0–5 to 0–4 to return to the Senior league. They went on to defeat local rivals Dungannon in the first round of the Senior Championship the following year, in 1989. The Senior team maintained its position in Tyrone's top division throughout the 1990s. Youth teams were successful in this time, winning a Minor League in 1992, an Under−16 'double' in 1993 and an U-18 'double' in 1997.

=== 2000s ===
The club narrowly avoided relegation to the Tyrone second tier in 2008, but saw an improved performance in 2009. The Under-14s have won the Grade 1 championship while the minor team secured a double, beating Pomeroy in the league final and Greencastle in the Championship decider, both matches in Galbally.

Eugene McKenna and Joe Daly stepped down as senior team managers at the end of the 2010 season, when the team finished mid-table, replaced by former club player Adrian Cush. The pats finished 5th in the division 1 ACL for 2011, but were eliminated early in the championship by Omagh.

From 2012 to 2015, Donaghmore had tough seasons in Division 1 under the management teams of Adrian Cush/Feargal Logan, Sean McCabe & Sean Marty Lockhart, before dropping to the Intermediate league at the end of the 2015 season for only the seventh time in the club's history. Gary and Richard Hetherington took over as managers hoping to bring the club back to Senior football, which they did, with Donaghmore also winning the Minor grade two league title, and their first Reserve Intermediate Championship.

== Achievements ==
Men's Honours -

- Tyrone Senior Football Championship (1)
  - 1927
- Tyrone Intermediate Football Championship
  - 1965, 1968, 1988, 1996
- Tyrone Junior Football Championship (3)
  - 1927, 1933, 1954
- Tyrone Senior Football League (2)
  - 1971, 1999
- Tyrone Intermediate Football League (4)
  - 1968, 1972, 1986, 2016
- Tyrone Junior Football League (3)
  - 1946, 1952

U21 Honours -

- 2014 – Tyrone Grade 2 Under-21 Football Championship
- 2015 – Tyrone Grade 1 Under-21 Football Championship
