= Carrickmore St Colmcille's GFC =

Tyrone-based Gaelic games club

Carrickmore St Colmcille's
- An Charraig Mhór Naomh Colmcille
- Founded: 1932
- County: Tyrone
- Nickname: Carmen
- Colours: Green, White and Gold
- Grounds: Páirc Colmcille, Carrickmore
- Coordinates: 54°35′31.13″N 7°04′02.34″W

Playing kits
Home Kit	Change Kit

Senior Club Championships
	All Ireland	Ulster champions	Tyrone champions
Football:	0	0	15
Ladies' football:	0	3	13

Carrickmore St Colmcille's is a Gaelic football and Ladies' Gaelic football club based in Carrickmore, County Tyrone, Northern Ireland. They have won the Tyrone Senior Football Championship 15 times, more than any other club.

== Roll of honour ==
Men's football

- Tyrone Senior Football Championship: (15)
  - 1940, 1943, 1949, 1961, 1966, 1969, 1977, 1978, 1979, 1995, 1996, 1999, 2001, 2004, 2005
- Tyrone All-County League Division 1: (10)
  - 1969, 1977, 1992, 1993, 1994, 1995, 1998, 2000, 2013, 2021

Ladies' football

- Ulster Ladies' Senior Club Football Championship: (3)
  - 1992, 2001, 2002
- Tyrone Ladies' Senior Football Championship: (13)
  - 1992, 1995, 1997, 1999, 2001, 2002, 2003, 2004, 2005, 2006, 2008, 2013, 2021
- Tyrone Ladies' Intermediate Football Championship: (1)
  - 2020

== Notable players ==
- Conor Gormley
- Martin Penrose
- Frankie Donnelly
