= Clonoe O'Rahilly's GAC =

Tyrone-based Gaelic games club

Clonoe O'Rahilly's
- Cluain Eo Uí Raithile
- Founded: 1916
- County: Tyrone
- Nickname: O'Rahilly's
- Colours: Black & White
- Grounds: O'Rahilly Park

Playing kits
Standard

Clonoe O'Rahilly's GAC is a Gaelic Athletic Association club from Clonoe, County Tyrone, Northern Ireland. Their home ground is O'Rahilly Park which was opened in 1952.

== History ==
Clonoe Gaelic Football Club was founded in 1916 and named after one of the Rebels in the 1916 Easter Rising. It was not until the 1940s that the Clonoe team became firmly established in Gaelic football. In 1941 Clonoe reached the Tyrone Senior Football Championship final for the first time and was beaten by Moortown St Malachy's. The 1950s was Clonoe's most successful decade, with the official opening of O'Rahilly Park in 1952 and a place in the County Finals in 1952, 1953, 1956, 1958 and 1959. In 1958 Clonoe defeated Carrickmore in the Final and the arrival of The O'Neill Cup at 'the Corner' became a reality. The 1960s were also successful for Clonoe with wins in 1960, 1961 and 1965. In 1973 the new Social Club was opened and a reserve team formed which won the Intermediate Championship in 1983. The O'Rahillys would stop local rivals Coalisland Na Fianna from winning the 'three in a row' in the 1991 Senior Championship Final in Edendork. Four years later in 1995 the club would win the Intermediate League and Championship double going the year undefeated, defeating Pomeroy Plunketts in the Championship Final. The club would open a brand new state of the art community centre in 1998 which included a social club, changing facilities and a gym. The club won the Grade One Minor Championship in 2001 defeating Cookstown FR Rocks in Coalisland. Damien Cassidy, an All-Ireland champion with Derry in 1993 was appointed as the new Clonoe senior manager in 2008 and subsequently led the Rahilly's to their first Tyrone Senior Championship in 17 years defeating reigning champions, Dromore by 0-10 to 0-9 after extra time at Healy Park, Omagh. Cassidy would return to The Rahilly's in 2011 following a two year stint with his native Derry. In his first year back he guided the club to another County Final, this time being defeated by Dromore. The Rahilly's would win their first ever Senior League in 2012, beating neighbours Coalisland in the Final at Pairc Arthur Mallon. Clonoe won their second Tyrone Senior Championship in 5 years in 2013 defeating a very strong Carrickmore side in Omagh. The club also won the u21 Tyrone Championship in 2013 edging Pomeroy Plunketts in a close affair in the final. The team would go on to win the Ulster Championship at the level in 2014 defeating the likes of Kilcar and Truagh Gaels on their way to lifting the title. The Rahilly's would add another Senior League in 2015 once again defeating Carrickmore in O'Neill Park, Dungannon. The club went on to win the Intermediate League Title in 2023 following relegation from Division One in 2022. The club would once again be relegated in 2024 following a playoff defeat to Moortown St Malachy's but would bounce straight back up at the first time of asking by winning the Intermediate League and Championship double undefeated as they did 30 years previous, this time beating Eglish St Patrick's in a cracker of a final at O'Neill Park. The club would go on to win their first ever Ulster Club game, defeating Down Champions, Saval in O'Neills Healy Park before getting eliminated by Cavan Champions, Cuchullains in the Ulster Semi-Final at the Box-It Athletic Grounds. The Rahilly's opened up 2 new state-of-the-art football pitches in 2025 as well as announcing plans to construct a new multi-million spectator stand and changing facilities which is to be completed in 2026 following the Club Development draw.

== Achievements ==
- Tyrone Senior Football Championship: (8)
  - 1958, 1959, 1960, 1964, 1965, 1991, 2008, 2013
- Tyrone Intermediate Football Championship: (5)
  - 1976, 1979, 1983, 1995, 2025
