= Trillick St Macartan's GAC =

Tyrone-based Gaelic games club

St Macartan's GAC, Trillick
- CLG Naomh Mhic Artain, Trí Leac
- Founded: 1932
- County: Tyrone
- Colours: Red and White
- Grounds: Páirc Uí Dhonnaile
- Coordinates: 54°27′10″N 7°29′28″W

Playing kits
Standard colours

Senior Club Championships
	All Ireland	Ulster champions	Tyrone champions
Football:	0	0	9

Trillick St Macartan's is a Gaelic Athletic Association club based in the parish of Trillick in western County Tyrone, Northern Ireland. It competes at Senior level in Tyrone GAA competitions (earlier clubs in the area having played at times in Fermanagh GAA competitions). The club plays Gaelic football, ladies' Gaelic football and camogie.

== History ==
A branch of the Gaelic League was formed in Trillick on 29 December 1901, and the League pioneered the playing of Gaelic games in 1902. At a Gaelic League Feis in Trillick on 15 August 1903, parish teams from Trillick, Golan, Moorfield and Liffer played the first competitive football games in Trillick. By December 1903, a parish football and hurling club, named 'Lisdoo Young Ireland', had been formed, Lisdoo being one of only five teams taking part in the first Tyrone senior football championship in November 1904.

In 1906, the 'Trillick Red Hands' football team was formed. In 1907, this club reached the final of the first cup competition in Tyrone, the McAnespie Cup, presented by Trillick-born James McAnespie. The Red Hands, Glassmullagh St Colmcille's and Coa hurling teams, and Trillick and Knocknagor camogie teams, all from the Trillick parish, played at a Gaelic League Feis in Trillick on 15 August 1907. In 1909 there were three clubs in the parish: the Red Hands (which disbanded in 1910), Golan and Bundoran Junction Éire Ógs; however until 1914, matches were only played on Feis days.

The 'Trillick MacDonagh's' team functioned in 1914–18 and 1923–28, but many prominent players were lost in "The Troubles". The Gaelic League flourished up to 1920, Trillick parish priest Fr Matt Maguire being President of Dáil Uladh.

Following the establishment of the West Tyrone Board on 29 October 1931, the Trillick St Macartan's Club was formed in 1932, continuing to this day. It was named for Mac Cairthinn of Clogher (died AD 506), the first Bishop of Clogher. The Ulster Council ruled in 1933 that the Tyrone County Board had jurisdiction over the club, rejecting the claim of Fermanagh.

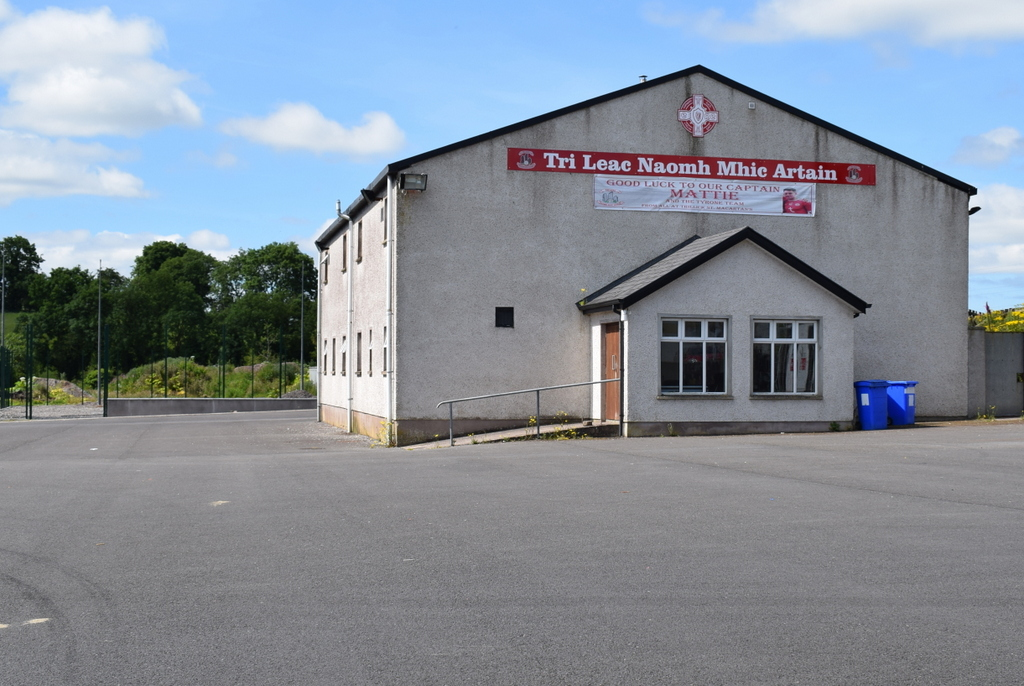
Trillick's grounds

Trillick won the GAA's Centenary Year Club of Year Award in 1984.

== Gaelic football ==
In 1937 Trillick won its first senior championship, being League winners in 1937, 1938 and 1939. Beaten by the eventual champions in 1938, Trillick were awaiting the 1939 final when the Tyrone County Board declared that year's championship void. Trillick's Paddy Donnelly captained Tyrone's first ever cup-winning team, the Dr Lagan Cup winners, on 8 November 1942.

Trillick U-16's were Tyrone champions in 1965, being beaten finalists in 1964 and 1968, the U-18's being County champions in 1968 and 1969. Trillick won the Tyrone Senior Football Championship again in 1974 (when they reached the Ulster Senior Club Football Championship final) and have won five subsequent titles. Relegated to the Intermediate ranks in 2007, Trillick won the Intermediate Football Championship in 2008 defeating Moy in the final in Carrickmore. They progressed to the Ulster Intermediate Club Football Championship, and became the first team from the parish to win a Provincial title defeating Greenlough of Derry. Upon promotion to Senior ranks in 2015 they then went on to win the Senior Championship the same year, beating Killyclogher in the final on 11 October 2015 on a scoreline of 1–09 to 0–11. Trillick won another senior Championship in 2019, beating Dromore in the first round before beating Clonoe, holders Coalisland and Errigal Ciaran in the final on a score line of 0-12 to 2-4.

=== Honours ===
- Ulster Senior Club Football Championship (0): (runners-up in 1974)
- Tyrone Senior Football Championship (9): 1937, 1974, 1975, 1980, 1983, 1986, 2015, 2019, 2023
- Tyrone All-County League Division 1 (12): 1937, 1938, 1939, 1973, 1977, 1982, 1983, 1984, 1985, 1987, 2022, 2023, 2025
- Jim Devlin Memorial Cup (League Cup) (2): 1988, 1989
- Tyrone Intermediate Football Championship (1): 2008
- Ulster Intermediate Club Football Championship (1): 2008

== Ladies' Gaelic football ==
The Trillick ladies' football team won the Division Two League in 1995, reached the county Championship final in 1999, and won the Tyrone and Ulster Junior Championship in 2018.

== Hurling ==
Glassmullagh St Colmcille's Hurling Club was formed in Trillick parish in 1905, and the Coa club soon afterwards. These Trillick hurlers competed mainly in Fermanagh, there being little interest in hurling in Tyrone. The two Trillick clubs not only met one another in two Fermanagh finals: they jointly provided the entire membership of the Fermanagh team that played in the 1939 Ulster junior hurling championship.

=== Honours ===
- Fermanagh Senior Hurling Championship (3): 1936, 1945, 1946 (Glassmullagh); 1938, 1939 (Coa)
- Tyrone Senior Hurling Championship (1): 1949 (Glassmullagh amalgamated with Dromore)

== Camogie ==
Trillick camogie team won the 1992 Tyrone Division Two League, but lost the county Championship final. In 1994 they won the Division Two Championship and League double.

== Facilities ==
In 1933 the club purchased a playing field beside the village for £110, one of the first clubs in Tyrone to do so. A pavilion was erected in 1934. In 1949, Trillick Club built a hall to serve as social centre and dressing rooms. This was extended in 1977–78 and 1987.

The Willie Donnelly Memorial Park, enlarged in 1970, had floodlighting installed in 1984, and a Prunty pitch and covered stand provided in 2003. New dressing rooms were built in 2000 and a training pitch adjoining St Scire's school was developed in 1998–2001.

== Notable players ==
- Mattie Donnelly, All-Ireland Minor Football Championship medalist 2008 and Senior medalist 2021
- Niall Gormley, 2001 All-Ireland Minor medal winner and 2008 All-Ireland Senior Football Championship medal winner
