= Killyclogher St Mary's GAC =

Tyrone-based Gaelic games club

Killyclogher St Mary's
- Coill an Chlochair Naoimh Muire
- Founded: 1904
- County: Tyrone
- Nickname: Cappagh
- Colours: Navy and Sky Blue
- Grounds: Ballinamullan
- Coordinates: 54°36′05.88″N 7°15′16.44″W

Playing kits
Standard colours

Senior Club Championships
	All Ireland	Ulster champions	Tyrone champions
Football:	0	0	2
Hurling:	0	0	8

Killyclogher St Mary's is a Gaelic Athletic Association club based in the village of Killyclogher in County Tyrone, Northern Ireland. After many years of underage success, the club finally made the Senior Championship breakthrough in 2003. In 2016 they added another Senior Championship to their collection. They have appeared in 5 Senior County finals in the last 20 years.

== Notable players ==
- Mark Bradley
- Dermot Carlin
- Tiernan McCann

== Achievements ==
- Tyrone Senior Football Championship: (2)
  - 2003, 2016
- Tyrone All-County League Division 1: (4)
  - 2001, 2014, 2020, 2026
- Tyrone All-County League Division 2: (4)
  - 1979, 1987, 1992, 1996
- Tyrone Junior Football Championship: (2)
  - 1906, 1977
- Tyrone Senior Hurling Championship: (8)
  - 1906, 1947, 1950, 1953, 1977, 1991, 1994, 1995
