= 2021 All-Ireland Senior Football Championship final =

Football match

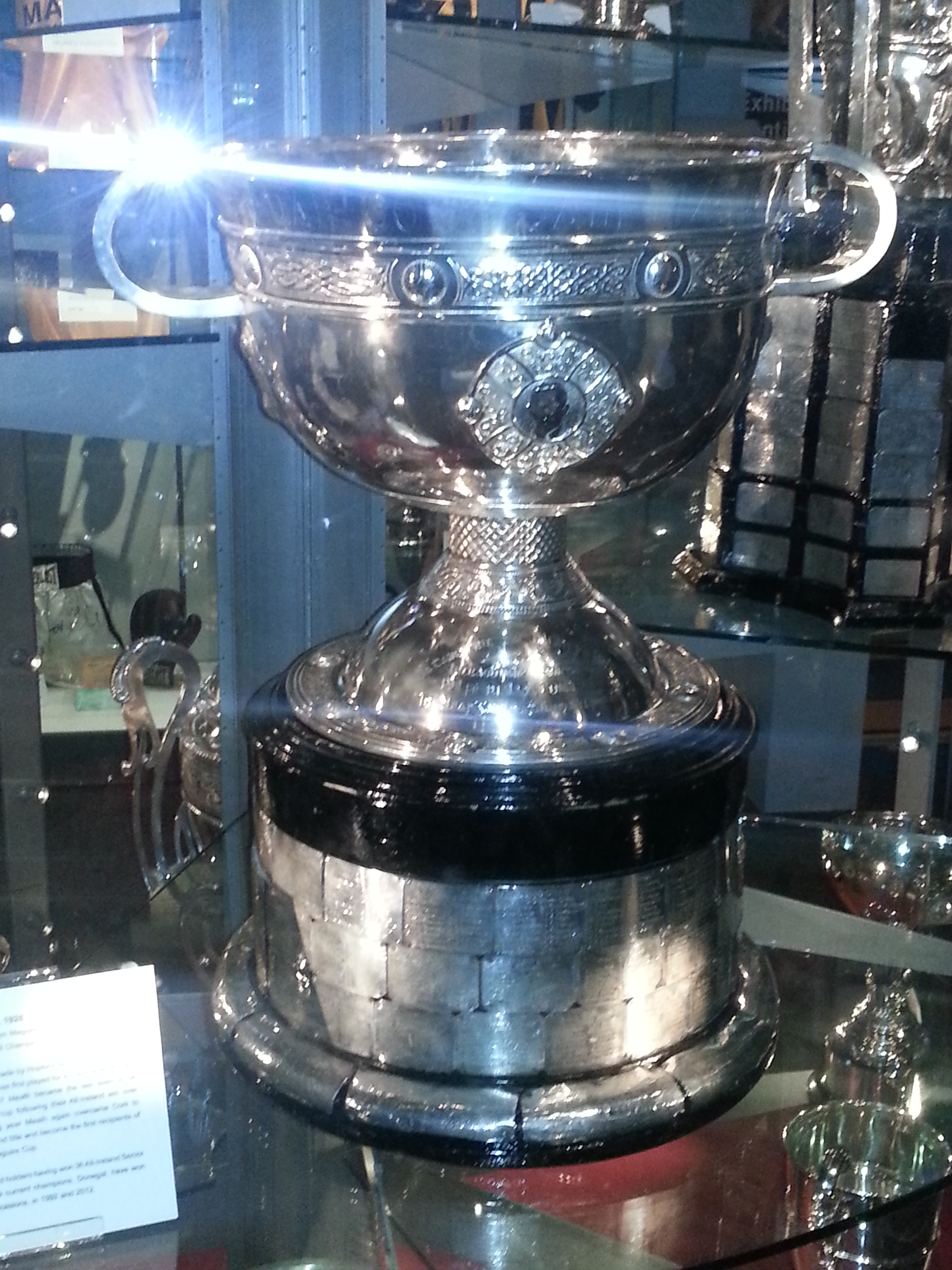
- The trophy in August 2013
- Event: 2021 All-Ireland Senior Football Championship
Tyrone	Mayo
2–14 (20)	0–15 (15)
- Date: 11 September 2021
- Venue: Croke Park, Dublin
- Man of the Match: Darren McCurry
- Referee: Joe McQuillan (Cavan)
- Attendance: 41,150
- Weather: 19 °C (66 °F), Sunny

The 2021 All-Ireland Senior Football Championship final was a Gaelic football match played at Croke Park in Dublin on 11 September 2021 between Mayo and Tyrone, the culmination of the 2021 All-Ireland Senior Football Championship. It was the 134th final of that sport's primary competition, the All-Ireland Senior Football Championship. It was originally scheduled for 28 August but had to be postponed by two weeks when the Tyrone–Kerry semi-final was postponed due to a COVID-19 outbreak.

Ulster champion Tyrone took on Connacht champion Mayo, in what was a first ever meeting between the teams at this stage of the competition, with the Ulster champion winning a 4th title after a 2–14 to 0–15 win. Mayo lost their 11th consecutive final since 1989 (a time when Tyrone had yet to win 1), including a sixth decider in 9 years, with this latest defeat on an identical scoreline to 2020 (when Mayo lost to Dublin), still enough for Tyrone to overtake Mayo on the all-time honours list. Yet this latest defeat was the last of the cursed finals, and Tyrone remained ahead of Mayo for only 5 years.

The game was televised nationally on RTÉ2 as part of The Saturday Game live programme, presented by Joanne Cantwell from the outdoor COVID-19 pandemic-proofed studio at Croke Park, with analysis from Kevin McStay, Seán Cavanagh and Pat Spillane. Match commentary was provided by Ger Canning, assisted by Tomás Ó Sé. The game was also televised internationally by Sky Sports.

== Background ==
- Mayo were aiming to win their fourth title and first All-Ireland since 1951. Since then, they had lost ten finals (1989, 1996, 1997, 2004, 2006, 2012, 2013, 2016, 2017, 2020).
- Tyrone appeared in their seventh final, winning on three occasions in 2003, 2005 and 2008.
- This final was the fifth to be contested by county teams from Connacht and Ulster, the other finals were 1925 (Galway beat Cavan), 1943 (Roscommon beat Cavan), 1948 (Cavan beat Mayo) and 2012 (Donegal beat Mayo).

== Paths to the final ==
=== Mayo ===
26 June 2021 Connacht Quarter-final	Mayo	3–23 – 0–12	Sligo	Markievicz Park, Sligo
16:30
	Gls: Aidan O'Shea 2, Darren McHale 1 Pts: Aidan O'Shea 2, Darren McHale 5, Ryan O'Donoghue 5 (4f), Eoghan McLaughlin, Conor Loftus, Tommy Conroy 2 each, Patrick Durcan, Jordan Flynn, Fergal Boland, Stephen Coen, James Carr 1 each	Report	Pts: Niall Murphy 6 (1f), Sean Carrabine 2, Paddy O'Connor, Liam Gaughan, Mikey Gordon, Keelan Cawley 1 each	Referee: Paul Faloon (Down); Attendance: 200

11 July 2021 Connacht Semi-final	Mayo	5–20 – 0–11	Leitrim	MacHale Park, Castlebar
	Gls: Ryan O'Donoghue 1, Darren McHale 2, Darren Coen 1, Tommy Conroy 1 Pts: Ryan O'Donoghue 6 (3f), Darren McHale 1, Darren Coen and Tommy Conroy 3 each, Matthew Ruane and Conor Loftus 2 each, Stephen Coen, Aidan O'Shea, James Carr 1 each	Report	Pts: Keith Beirne 5f, Conor Dolan and Riordan O'Rourke 2 each, Paddy Maguire and Evan Sweeney 1 each	Referee: Fergal Kelly (Longford); Attendance: 3,500

25 July 2021 Connacht Final	Mayo	2–14 – 2–8	Galway	Croke Park, Dublin
13:30
	Gls: Ryan O'Donoghue 1 (pen), Matthew Ruane 1 Pts: Ryan O'Donoghue 3 (2f), Matthew Ruane 2, Conor Loftus and Tommy Conroy 2 each, Rob Hennelly (1 '45), Paddy Durcan, Darren McHale, Kevin McLoughlin, James Carr 1 each	Report	Gls: Shane Walsh 1, Damien Comer 1 Pts: Shane Walsh 1, Matthew Tierney 4 (3f), Paul Conroy 2, Cathal Sweeney 1	Referee: Conor Lane (Cork); Attendance: 18,000

14 August 2021 All-Ireland Semi-final	Mayo	0–17 – 0–14 (a.e.t.)	Dublin	Croke Park, Dublin
18:00 IST (UTC+1)		(HT: 0–4 – 0–10)
	Pts: Ryan O'Donoghue 5 (2fs), Tommy Conroy and Robert Hennelly (2fs, 1'45) 3 each, Darren Coen, Jordan Flynn, Kevin McLoughlin, Lee Keegan, Conor Loftus, Matthew Ruane 1 each	Report	Pts: Dean Rock 7 (5fs), Ciarán Kilkenny 3 (1m), Paddy Small 2, Con O'Callaghan and Seán Bugler 1 each	Referee: Conor Lane (Cork); Attendance: 24,000

=== Tyrone ===
10 July 2021 Ulster Quarter-final	Tyrone	1–18 – 0–13	Cavan	Healy Park, Omagh
16:30
	Gls: Brian Kennedy 1 Pts: Darren McCurry 10 (3f, 1m), Cathal McShane 3 (1f), Niall Sludden 2, Peter Harte, Richard Donnelly, Paul Donaghy 1 each	Report	Pts: Gearoid McKiernan 6 (4f), Conor Smith 2, Raymond Galligan 1f, Thomas Galligan, Gerard Smith, Oisin Pierso, Conor Madden 1 each	Attendance: 0 (Note: The game was played behind closed doors due to the COVID-19 pandemic in the Republic of Ireland)

18 July 2021 Ulster Semi-final	Tyrone	0–23 – 1–14	Donegal	Brewster Park, Enniskillen
13:45 IST (UTC+1)
	Pts: Darren McCurry 7 (3f), Kieran McGeary, Niall Sludden, Tiernan McCann 3 each, Mattie Donnelly 2, Peter Harte, Conor Meyler, Conor McKenna, Frank Burns 1 each, Cathal McShane 1f	Report	Gls: Caolan McGonigle 1 Pts: Paddy McBrearty 4 (2f), Jamie Brennan, Niall O’Donnell 2 each, Michael Langan 2 (1f), Michael Murphy 2f, Ciaran Thompson, Peader Mogan 1 each	Attendance: 0

31 July 2021 Ulster Final	Monaghan	0–15 – 0–16	Tyrone	Croke Park, Dublin
16:00
	Pts: Conor McManus 4 (3f), Jack McCarron 1m and Rory Beggan (2f) 2 each, Conor Boyle, Kieran Duffy, Killian Lavelle, Michael Bannigan, Conor McCarthy and Colin Walshe (1m) 1 each	Report	Gls: Darren McCurry 5 (2f, 1m), Mattie Donnelly 3 (1f), Mark Bradley 2, Padraig Hampsey, Michael McKiernan, Niall Sludden, Peter Harte, Kieran McGeary and Cathal McShane 1 each	Attendance: 18,000

28 August 2021 (Note: The game between Kerry and Tyrone was initially due to be played on 15 August 2021, but was rescheduled to 21 August due to COVID-19 issues. Tyrone subsequently stated that they were unable to play on 21 August as several players had contracted COVID-19. It was eventually rescheduled to 28 August.) All-Ireland Semi-final	Kerry	0–22 (22) – (23) 3–14 (a.e.t.)	Tyrone	Croke Park, Dublin
15:30 IST (UTC+1)		(HT: 0-09 (9) – (10) 1-07)
	Pts: David Clifford (3f, 1m), Seán O’Shea (6f, 1 '45) 8 each, Paudie Clifford 2, Paul Murphy, Diarmuid O’Connor, Paul Geaney, Tom O’Sullivan 1 each	Report	Gls: Cathal McShane 1, Conor McKenna 2 Pts: Cathal McShane 3 (1f), Darren McCurry 4 (0-2f), Niall Morgan 2 (1 ’45, 1f), Michael McKernan, Ronan McNamee, Pádraig Hampsey, Peter Harte, Mattie Donnelly (1m) 1 each	Referee: David Coldrick (Meath); Attendance: 24,000

== Pre-match ==
Cavan's Joe McQuillan was the referee for the final. He was previously in charge of finals in 2011, 2013, and 2017.

Meath played Tyrone in the All-Ireland Minor Football Championship final which took place on 28 August, two weeks before the senior final. Meath won the game on a 1–12 to 1–11 scoreline.

Unlike 2020, President Michael D. Higgins attended the final, with no official greeting of the players due to COVID-19.

== Match ==
=== Summary ===
In front of a crowd of 41,150 fans (reduced to 50% capacity due to COVID-19), the match began with Mayo's Aidan O'Shea claiming the throw-in and giving a direct ball into Tommy Conroy who kicked the opening score at 16 seconds. Mayo, being the slight favourites, led by 0–02 to Tyrone's 0–01 by the sixth minute.

At half time, the score was at 0–10 – 0–08, with Tyrone leading by two points. The second half saw Tyrone score two goals from substitute Cathal McShane and Darren McCurry. Mayo were not able to avail of three other goal scoring opportunities, including a penalty missed by Ryan O'Donoghue.

Mayo went on to have Matthew Ruane red-carded after an altercation with Tyrone midfielder Conn Kilpatrick. The victory was first and foremost a tribute to the Ulster champions' defending as a team. For Mayo, this latest defeat came on an identical scoreline to 2020 and meant the team had lost one third of the total number of All-Ireland SFC finals played since 1989.

=== Details ===
11 September 2021; 17:00 IST (UTC+1); All-Ireland Final	Tyrone	2–14 (20) – (15) 0–15; HT: 0–10 – 0-08	Mayo	Croke Park, Dublin; Attendance: 41,150; Referee: Joe McQuillan (Cavan)
11 September 2021; 17:00 IST (UTC+1); All-Ireland Final	Darren McCurry 1–4 (0-2f), Cathal McShane 1–0, Niall Morgan 0–3 (0-2f, 0–1 '45), Niall Sludden 0–2, Pádraig Hampsey, Peter Harte (0–1 mark), Kieran McGeary, Mattie Donnelly, Darragh Canavan 0–1 each	Report	Ryan O'Donoghue 0–8 (0-7f), Tommy Conroy 0–2, Robbie Hennelly (0-1f), Lee Keegan, Patrick Durcan, Stephen Coen, Kevin McLoughlin 0–1 each	Croke Park, Dublin; Attendance: 41,150; Referee: Joe McQuillan (Cavan)

Tyrone	Mayo

GK	1	Niall Morgan
CB	2	Michael McKernan
FB	3	Ronan McNamee
CB	4	Pádraig Hampsey (c)
WB	5	Frank Burns
HB	6	Peter Harte
WB	7	Kieran McGeary
MF	8	Brian Kennedy	(substituted off) 56'
MF	9	Conn Kilpatrick	(substituted off) 73'
WF	10	Conor Meyler
HF	11	Michael O'Neill	(substituted off) 53'
WF	12	Niall Sludden
CF	13	Darren McCurry
FF	14	Mattie Donnelly	(substituted off) 44'
CF	15	Conor McKenna	(substituted off) 66'
Substitutes:
GK	16	Lorcan Quinn
FW	17	Mark Bradley
FW	18	Darragh Canavan	(substituted on) 53'
DF	19	Paul Donaghy	(substituted on) 66'
FW	20	Niall Kelly
MF	21	Tiernan McCann	(substituted on) 70+3'
FW	22	Ben McDonnell	(substituted on) 56'
DF	23	Hugh Pat McGeary
DF	24	Cathal McShane	(substituted on) 44'
FW	25	Jonathan Munroe
FW	26	Conor Shields
Manager:
Feargal Logan & Brian Dooher

GK	1	Rob Hennelly
CB	2	Pádraig O'Hora	(substituted off) 52'
FB	3	Lee Keegan
CB	4	Michael Plunkett	(substituted off) HT'
WB	5	Paddy Durcan
HB	6	Stephen Coen
WB	19	Oisín Mullin
MF	8	Matthew Ruane
MF	9	Conor Loftus	(substituted off) 65'
WF	10	Diarmuid O'Connor
HF	11	Aidan O'Shea (c)
WF	12	Bryan Walsh	(substituted off) 58'
CF	13	Kevin McLoughlin	(substituted off) 70+4'
FF	14	Tommy Conroy
CF	15	Ryan O'Donoghue
Substitutes:
GK	16	Rory Byrne
DF	7	Enda Hession	(substituted on) HT'
FW	17	Brendan Harrison
FW	18	Colm Boyle
FW	20	Rory Brickenden
MF	21	Jordan Flynn	(substituted on) 52'
FW	22	Conor O'Shea
DF	23	James Durcan
DF	24	Darren Coen	(substituted on) 58'
FW	25	Aidan Orme	(substituted on) 65'
FW	26	James Carr	(substituted on) 70+4'
Manager:
James Horan

Man of the Match:
Darren McCurry

== Post-match ==
Mayo's curse at All-Ireland finals continued with the county losing 11 consecutive finals, now having lost a third of all All-Ireland football finals played since 1989, with this latest defeat on an identical scoreline to 2020, when Mayo lost to Dublin. Pat Spillane, referring to Mayo's long losing streak in All-Ireland SFC finals, quoted Samuel Beckett on television afterwards.

Mayo players Aidan O'Shea and Lee Keegan broke an unwanted record of most All-Ireland football final appearances without winning (6), with the duo losing 6 finals in 9 years (2012, 2013, 2016, 2017, 2020 and 2021).

Conor McKenna became the fourth former AFL player to win the Sam Maguire Cup.

Brian Dooher became the fifth manager to win an All-Ireland Senior Football Championship after earlier captaining his county to victory in the same competition (and the first since Páidí Ó Sé in 1997).

== See also ==
- 1918 All-Ireland Senior Football Championship final, also postponed due to an outbreak of infectious disease
- 1956 All-Ireland Senior Football Championship final, also postponed due to an outbreak of infectious disease
