= Michael McKernan =

Gaelic footballer

Personal information
- Native name: Micheál Mac Thiarnáin (Irish)
- Born: 27 October 1997 (age 29)
- Occupation: Financial advisor

Sport
- Sport: Gaelic football
- Position: Right Corner Back
Club
- Years: Club
- Coalisland
Club titles
- Tyrone titles: 1
Inter-county
- Years: County
- 2018–: Tyrone
Inter-county titles
- Ulster titles: 1
- All-Irelands: 1

Michael McKernan (born 27 October 1997) is a Gaelic footballer who plays for the Coalisland club and the Tyrone county team.

== Honours ==
Tyrone

- All-Ireland Senior Football Championship (1): 2021
- Ulster Senior Football Championship (1): 2021

Coalisland

- Tyrone Senior Football Championship (1): 2018
