= 2021 Down county football team season =

Down county football team
2021 season
- Manager: Paddy Tally
- Stadium: Páirc Esler, Newry
- NFL D2: Relegation play-off winner
- All-Ireland SFC: Did not qualify
- Ulster SFC: Preliminary round
- Dr McKenna Cup: Cancelled

The following is a summary of Down county football team's 2021 season, which was its 118th year. The season was suspended until May 2021 due to the impact of the COVID-19 pandemic on Gaelic games.

== Kits ==
Home

== Competitions ==
=== Dr McKenna Cup ===
There was no McKenna Cup in 2021 due to the impact of the COVID-19 pandemic on Gaelic games.

=== National Football League Division 2 North ===
Down were promoted to Division 2 following their 2020 campaign, however in December 2020, it was announced that each division would be divided into North and South sections in order to reduce fixtures and minimise cross-border matches. Teams will play three league games, plus possibly two knockout matches, allowing the tournament to be finished in just five rounds of games. In February 2021, it was announced that the league would be delayed due to the impact of the COVID-19 pandemic on Gaelic games, but that cancelling it would be a last resort.

The National League began on 15 May 2021. Following two defeats Down entered into the relegation play-offs, beating Laois 2-19 - 2-12 to retain their Division 2 status for the 2022 campaign.

==== Table ====
Pos	Team	Pld	W	D	L	PF	PA	PD	Pts	Qualification
1	Mayo (P)	3	3	0	0	74	50	+24	6	Advance to Division 2 semi-finals; both finalists are promoted to Division 1
2	Meath	3	2	0	1	55	55	0	4	Advance to Division 2 semi-finals; both finalists are promoted to Division 1
3	Down	3	1	0	2	41	60	−19	2	Advance to a relegation playoff; losers are relegated to Division 3
4	Westmeath (R)	3	0	0	3	45	50	−5	0	Advance to a relegation playoff; losers are relegated to Division 3

Updated to match(es) played on 30 May 2021. Source: GAA.ie
Rules for classification: Tiebreakers
(P) Promoted; (R) Relegated

==== Fixtures ====
15 May 2021
14:00
Round 1

Mayo	2-21 - 1-11	Down
Cillian O'Connor (0-8), Tommy Conroy (1-3), Ryan O'Donoghue (1-1), Matthew Ruane (0-2), Jordan Flynn (0-1), Fionn McDonagh (0-1), Michael Plunkett (0-1), Diarmuid O'Connor (0-1), Bryan Walsh (0-1), Eoghan McLaughlin (0-1)	Report	Barry O'Hagan 0-5 (0-4), Stephen McConville 1-0, Corey Quinn 0-2 (0-1), James Guinness (0-1), Daniel Guinness (0-1), Paul Devlin (0-1), Liam Kerr (0-1)

MacHale Park, Castlebar
Referee: Fergal Kelly (Longford)
23 May 2021
15:45
Round 2

Meath	2-15 - 0-14	Down
Cillian O'Sullivan (2-1), Jordan Morris (0-7), Thomas O'Reilly (0-1), Andrew Colgan (0-1) Cathal Hickey (0-1), Ethan Devine (0-1), Bryan McMahon (0-1), Matthew Costello (0-1), Eamon Wallace (0-1)	Report	Paul Devlin (0-5), Cory Quinn (0-4), Ryan McEvoy (0-2), Conor McCrickard (0-2), Barry O’Hagan (0-1)

Athletic Grounds, Armagh
Referee: Niall Cullen (Fermanagh)
30 May 2021
13:45
Round 3

Westmeath	1-09 - 0-13	Down
John Heslin 0-6, Fola Ayorinde 1-0, Ronan O'Toole 0-1, Brandon Kelly 0-1, Ger Egan 0-1	Report	Corey Quinn 0-7, Paul Devlin 0-2, Pierce Laverty (0-1), Ryan McEvoy (0-1), Liam Kerry (0-1), Caolan Molloy (0-1)

Cusack Park, Mullingar
Referee: Sean Lonergan (Tipperary)
12 June 2021
18:15
Relegation play-off

Down	2-19 - 2-12	Laois
Barry O'Hagan (1-9), Caolan Mooney (1-2), Cory Quinn (0-2), Liam Kerr (0-1), Darren O'Hagan (0-1), Pierce Laverty (0-1), Gerard Collins (0-1), Stephen McConville (0-1), Conor McCrickard (0-1)	Report	Donie Kingston (1-3), Evan O'Carroll (1-0), Niall Corbet (0-3), Kieran Lillis (0-2), Colm Begley (0-1), Eoin Lowry (0-1), Colm Murphy (0-1), Gary Walsh (0-1)

Páirc Esler, Newry
Referee: Jerome Henry (Mayo)

=== Ulster Senior Football Championship ===
The draw for the 2021 Ulster Championship was made on 22 April 2021.

==== Fixtures ====
27 June 2021
19:00
Preliminary Round

Down	1-12 - 2-25	Donegal
Caolan Mooney (1-0), Barry O'Hagan (0-8), Liam Kerr (0-2), James Guinness (0-1), Darren O'Hagan (0-1)	Report	Patrick McBrearty (1-6), Jamie Brennan (1-1), Ryan McHugh (0-4), Michael Langan (0-4), Peadar Mogan (0-3), Michael Murphy (0-2), Ciaran Thompson (0-1), Niall O'Donnell (0-1), Eoin McHugh (0-1), Conor O'Donnell (0-1), Ethan O'Donnell (0-1)

Páirc Esler, Newry
Referee: Maurice Deegan (Laois)

==== Bracket ====
Preliminary round
Down	1-12
Donegal	2-25

Quarter-finals
Armagh	4-15
Antrim	0-14
Monaghan	1-21
Fermanagh	0-14
Tyrone	1-18
Cavan	0-13
Derry	0-15
Donegal	0-16

Semi-finals
Armagh	2-21
Monaghan	4-17
Tyrone	0-23
Donegal	1-14

Final
Monaghan	0-15
Tyrone	0-16

=== All-Ireland Senior Football Championship ===
Down could only enter the All-Ireland Senior Football Championship if they won the Ulster Championship. Following a defeat to Donegal, Down did not enter the 2021 All-Ireland Championship.
