= GAA/GPA Footballer of the Year =

Award in Gaelic football

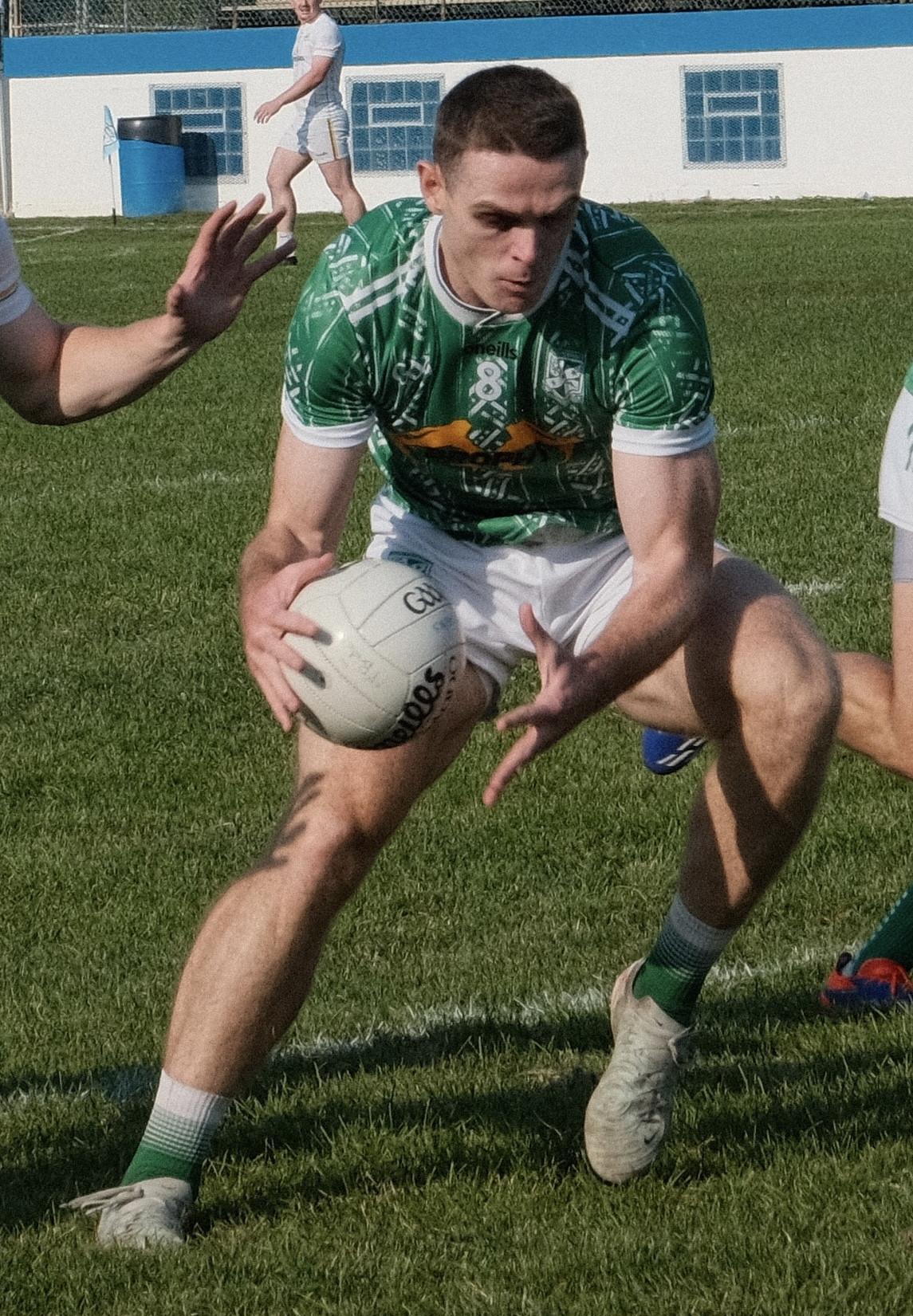
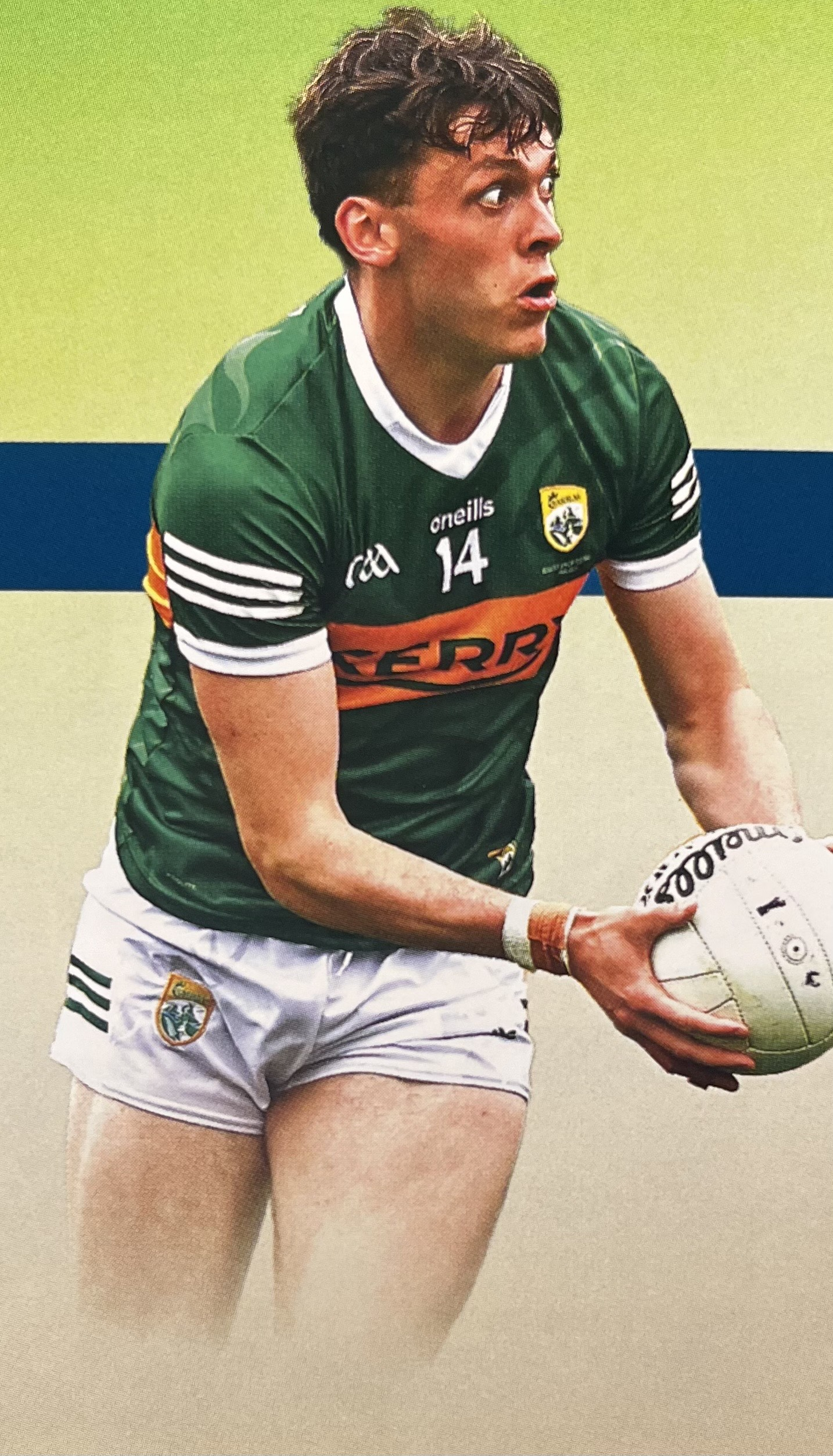
- Winners Brian Fenton and David Clifford
- Awarded for: Excellence in Gaelic football
- Sponsored by: PwC
- Location: Convention Centre Dublin
- Country: Ireland
- Presented by: Gaelic Athletic Association/Gaelic Players Association
- First award: 1995
- Currently held by: Ryan O'Donoghue (2026)

Highlights
- Most awards: David Clifford (3 awards)
- Website: Broadcast partner

Television/radio coverage
- Network: RTÉ One
- Runtime: 90 minutes

The Gaelic Athletic Association & Gaelic Player's Association All Stars Footballer of the Year — known for sponsorship reasons as the PwC GAA/GPA Footballer of the Year — is a Gaelic football award. It is presented annually to the footballer who performed outstandingly in that year's All-Ireland Senior Football Championship.

== History ==
Created in 1995, the award is part of the All Stars Awards, which selects a "fantasy team", comprising the best players from that year's All-Ireland Senior Football Championship. Voting for the award is undertaken by a select group of journalists from television and the print media.

== Winners and nominees ==
Table key
‡	Indicates the winner

=== 1990s ===
Year	Player	County	Ref(s)
1995	Peter Canavan ‡	Tyrone	
1996	Trevor Giles ‡	Meath	
1997	Maurice Fitzgerald ‡	Kerry	
1998	Jarlath Fallon ‡	Galway	
1999	Trevor Giles ‡	Meath	

=== 2000s ===
Year	Player	County	Ref(s)
2000	Seamus Moynihan ‡	Kerry	
2001	Declan Meehan ‡	Galway	
2002	Kieran McGeeney ‡	Armagh	
2003	Steven McDonnell ‡	Armagh	
2004	Tomás Ó Sé ‡	Kerry	
2005	Stephen O'Neill ‡	Tyrone	
2006	Kieran Donaghy ‡	Kerry	
2007	Marc Ó Sé ‡	Kerry	
2007	Colm Cooper	Kerry	
2007	Declan O'Sullivan	Kerry	
2008	Seán Cavanagh ‡	Tyrone	
2008	Colm Cooper	Kerry	
2008	Brian Dooher	Tyrone	
2009	Paul Galvin ‡	Kerry	
2009	Graham Canty	Cork	
2009	Tomás Ó Sé	Kerry	

=== 2010s ===
Year	Player	County	Ref(s)
2010	Bernard Brogan ‡	Dublin	
2010	Danny Hughes	Down	
2010	Michael Shields	Cork	
2011	Alan Brogan ‡	Dublin	
2011	Stephen Cluxton	Dublin	
2011	Darran O'Sullivan	Kerry	
2012	Karl Lacey ‡	Donegal	
2012	Colm McFadden	Donegal	
2012	Frank McGlynn	Donegal	
2013	Michael Darragh MacAuley ‡	Dublin	
2013	Stephen Cluxton	Dublin	
2013	Lee Keegan	Mayo	
2014	James O'Donoghue ‡	Kerry	
2014	Diarmuid Connolly	Dublin	
2014	Neil McGee	Donegal	
2015	Jack McCaffrey ‡	Dublin	
2015	Bernard Brogan	Dublin	
2015	Philly McMahon	Dublin	
2016	Lee Keegan ‡	Mayo	
2016	Brian Fenton	Dublin	
2016	Ciarán Kilkenny	Dublin	
2017	Andy Moran ‡	Mayo	
2017	David Clarke	Mayo	
2017	Stephen Cluxton	Dublin	
2017	James McCarthy	Dublin	
2018	Brian Fenton ‡	Dublin	
2018	Ciarán Kilkenny	Dublin	
2018	Jack McCaffrey	Dublin	
2019	Stephen Cluxton ‡	Dublin	
2019	Jack McCaffrey	Dublin	
2019	Con O'Callaghan	Dublin	

=== 2020s ===
Year	Player	County	Ref(s)
2020	Brian Fenton ‡	Dublin	
2020	Ciarán Kilkenny	Dublin	
2020	Cillian O'Connor	Mayo	
2021	Kieran McGeary ‡	Tyrone	
2021	Lee Keegan	Mayo	
2021	Conor Meyler	Tyrone	
2022	David Clifford ‡	Kerry	
2022	Cillian McDaid	Galway	
2022	Shane Walsh	Galway	
2023	David Clifford ‡	Kerry	
2023	Brian Fenton	Dublin	
2023	Brendan Rogers	Derry	
2024	Paul Conroy ‡	Galway	
2024	John Maher	Galway	
2024	Barry McCambridge	Armagh	
2025	David Clifford ‡	Kerry	
2025	Joe O’Connor	Kerry	
2025	Michael Murphy	Donegal	
2026	Ryan O'Donoghue ‡	Mayo	
2026	David Clifford	Kerry	
2026	Jack Carney	Mayo	

== Winners listed by province ==
Province	Number of wins	Winning years
Munster	10	1997, 2000, 2004, 2006, 2007, 2009, 2014, 2022, 2023, 2025
Leinster	9	1996, 1999, 2010, 2011, 2013, 2015, 2018, 2019, 2020
Ulster	7	1995, 2002, 2003, 2005, 2008, 2012, 2021
Connacht	5	1998, 2001, 2016, 2017, 2024, 2026

== Multiple winners ==
Player	Number of wins	Winning years
David Clifford	3	2022, 2023, 2025
Brian Fenton	2	2018, 2020
Trevor Giles	2	1996, 1999

== Brothers ==
Two sets of brothers have won the award. They are:

- Brogan: Bernard and Alan of Dublin
- Ó Sé: Tomás and Marc of Kerry
