= Pádraig Hampsey =

Irish Gaelic footballer

Personal information
- Native name: Pádraig Ó hAimsaigh (Irish)
- Born: 15 April 1994 (age 32)
- Occupation: Personal trainer

Sport
- Sport: Gaelic football
- Position: Left corner-back
Club
- Years: Club
- Coalisland
Club titles
- Tyrone titles: 1
Inter-county
- Years: County
- 2016–: Tyrone
Inter-county titles
- Ulster titles: 3
- All-Irelands: 1
- All Stars: 2

Pádraig Hampsey (born 15 April 1994) is a Gaelic footballer who plays for the Coalisland club and the Tyrone county team.

He started at corner-back for Tyrone in the 2018 All-Ireland Final defeat to Dublin.

In May 2021, he was named captain of Tyrone ahead of the NFL, and became the third Tyrone captain to lift the Sam Maguire Cup, following Tyrone's victory over Mayo in the 2021 All-Ireland Senior Football Championship Final.

== Honours ==
Tyrone

- All-Ireland Senior Football Championship (1): 2021 (c)
- Ulster Senior Football Championship (3): 2016, 2017, 2021 (c)
- All-Ireland Under-21 Football Championship (1): 2015
- Ulster Under-21 Football Championship (1): 2015
- Ulster Minor Football Championship (1): 2012 (c)

Coalisland

- Tyrone Senior Football Championship (1): 2018

Individual

- All Star Award (2): 2018, 2021

Sporting positions
Preceded by Mattie Donnelly	Tyrone Senior Football Captain; 2021–present	Succeeded by Incumbent
Achievements
Preceded by Stephen Cluxton (Dublin)	All-Ireland Senior Football Final winning captain 2021	Succeeded by Seán O'Shea (Kerry)
