= 2021 All-Ireland Senior Football Championship =

Gaelic Football Tournament

Championship details
- Dates: 26 June – 11 September 2021
- Teams: 31

All-Ireland Champions
- Winning team: Tyrone (4th win)
- Captain: Pádraig Hampsey
- Manager: Feargal Logan; Brian Dooher

All-Ireland Finalists
- Losing team: Mayo
- Captain: Aidan O'Shea
- Manager: James Horan

Provincial Champions
- Munster: Kerry
- Leinster: Dublin
- Ulster: Tyrone
- Connacht: Mayo

Championship statistics
- Top Scorer: Seán O'Shea (2–29)
- Player of the Year: Kieran McGeary

The 2021 All-Ireland Senior Football Championship (SFC) was the 135th edition of the Gaelic Athletic Association's premier inter-county Gaelic football tournament since its establishment in 1887.

Thirty one of the thirty two Irish counties took part – Kilkenny did not compete. London and New York were withdrawn as a result of the public health restrictions imposed due to the COVID-19 pandemic.

Most division three and four teams which did not reach their provincial final were scheduled to compete in the 2021 Tailteann Cup. In previous years, they would have competed in the All-Ireland SFC qualifiers. However, the introduction of the Tailteann Cup was postponed until 2022 (having been originally postponed from 2020).

There was no "Super 8" group stage (officially the All-Ireland quarter-final group stage). The four provincial winners advanced to the All-Ireland SFC semi-finals which were played as single knockout games.

Dublin were six-time defending champion, and were seeking to claim an unprecedented seventh consecutive title. Having won the Leinster SFC, they were defeated by Mayo in the All-Ireland SFC semi-finals.

The final was played on 11 September 2021 at Croke Park in Dublin, between Tyrone and Mayo, in what was a first meeting between the teams in the decider. Tyrone won a fourth title after a 2–14 to 0–15 win against Mayo. Mayo lost an 11th consecutive final since 1989, and a sixth final loss in nine years, with this latest defeat on an identical scoreline to 2020, when Mayo lost to Dublin.

== Format ==
=== Provincial Championships format ===
Connacht, Leinster, Munster and Ulster each organise a provincial championship. These tournaments are all straight knockout.

The draws took place on 19 April 2021 for the Connacht and Munster championships, and on 20 April 2021 for the Leinster and Ulster championships.

=== Qualifiers (cancelled) ===
Due to the COVID-19 pandemic, the qualifiers and Super 8s (officially the All-Ireland quarter-final group stage) were cancelled. Teams were eliminated following their first defeat.

It was planned to limit the qualifiers to mainly teams in the top two divisions of the National Football League but, due to the restricted season as a result of the COVID-19 health measures, the qualifiers and Super 8s were cancelled in their entirety.

=== All-Ireland format ===
The four provincial champions play in two semi-finals. All matches are knock-out. Any game that ends in a draw will go straight to extra-time. If the sides are level after extra-time the game will be decided by a penalty shootout.

== Rule changes since 2020 championship ==
- A penalty will be awarded for a 'cynical' foul that prevents a goal-scoring opportunity and occurs inside the twenty metre line or inside the semi-circular arc that extends from the centre of the twenty metre line. The player who committed the foul will receive a black card (and if they have previously received a yellow or black card, they will also receive a red card).
- The existing advantage rule was modified and implemented in the 2021 National Football League. Advantage is now only allowed to a player who has been fouled in two circumstances – 1) he has a goal-scoring opportunity 2) he has an opportunity to "create or avail of time and space" on the ball. Following its introduction, referees awarded fouls earlier where previously they would have allowed play to continue and this led to complaints that the flow of the game was being disrupted.
- The maor foirne (assistant manager) is not allowed to enter the field of play.
- Only one person is allowed to receive the trophy during the presentation to the winners.

== Symbols ==
f = free, m = mark, '45 = score direct from a '45, HT = Half time, AET = After extra time

== Provincial championships ==
=== Connacht Senior Football Championship ===
London and New York were withdrawn from the 2020 and 2021 Connacht championships due to international travel restrictions imposed due to the COVID-19 pandemic. But both are back in the 2022 season. Sligo withdrew from 2020 season due to COVID-19 too back in 2021.

There was a full open draw for first time in over 40 years. It took place on 19 April 2021.

Meaning 1st Championship meetings of Mayo hosting London also Roscommon and New York since 2016 will take place in the 2026 season instead according to Rotation.

Quarter-finals
Mayo	3-23
Sligo	0-12

Semi-finals
Leitrim	0-11
Mayo	5-20
Galway	2-11
Roscommon	0-12

Final
Mayo	2-14
Galway	2-8

25 July 2021; 13:30; Connacht Final	Mayo	2–14 – 2–8	Galway	Croke Park, Dublin; Attendance: 18,000; Referee: Conor Lane (Cork); Man of the Match: Matthew Ruane (Breaffy)
25 July 2021; 13:30; Connacht Final	Ryan O'Donoghue 1–3 (1–0 pen, 0-2f), Matthew Ruane 1–2, Conor Loftus and Tommy Conroy 0–2 each, Rob Hennelly (1 '45), Paddy Durcan, Darren McHale, Kevin McLoughlin, James Carr 0–1 each	Report	Shane Walsh 1–1, Matthew Tierney 0–4 (0-3f), Damien Comer 1–0, Paul Conroy 0–2, Cathal Sweeney 0–1	Croke Park, Dublin; Attendance: 18,000; Referee: Conor Lane (Cork); Man of the Match: Matthew Ruane (Breaffy)

=== Leinster Senior Football Championship ===
Dublin, Kildare, Laois and Meath received byes to the quarter-final stage because they reached the semi-final stage in 2020. There was a separate draw after the quarter-finals to determine the semi-final pairings.

The draw for round 1 and the quarter-finals took place on 20 April 2021. The semi-final draw took place on 4 July after the quarter-finals.

Preliminary round 27 June
Offaly	3-19 AET
Louth	0-19
Longford	0-25
Carlow	2-13
Wexford	2-11
Wicklow	0-14

Quarter-finals; 4 July
Kildare	1-15
Offaly	0-13
Laois	1-10
Westmeath	3-20
Meath	4-22
Longford	0-12
Dublin	0-15
Wexford	0-7

Semi-finals; 18 July
Kildare	2-14
Westmeath	0-18
Meath	1-13
Dublin	2-16

Final; 1 August
Kildare	1-9
Dublin	0-20

1 August 2021; 16:00; Leinster Final	Dublin	0–20 – 1–9	Kildare	Croke Park, Dublin; Attendance: 18,000; Referee: Martin McNally (Monaghan)
1 August 2021; 16:00; Leinster Final	Dean Rock 0–5 (0-3f), Ciaran Kilkenny (0-1m) and Cormac Costello 0–4 each, Niall Scully 0–2 (0-1m), James McCarthy, Brian Howard, Paddy Small, Con O'Callaghan, Ryan Basquel 0–1 each	Report	Daniel Flynn 1–2 (0-1m), Jimmy Hyland 0–4 (0-1m, 0-1f), Neil Flynn, Alex Beirne, Brian McLoughlin 0–1 each	Croke Park, Dublin; Attendance: 18,000; Referee: Martin McNally (Monaghan)

=== Munster Senior Football Championship ===
There was a return of a straight forward open draw for the first time since 2013. Tipperary won the title in 2020. Cork and Kerry met in the Semi Final last year, meaning Cork, Kerry or Tipperary were not permitted to be drawn together in the quarter-finals. The draw was held on 19 April 2021.

Quarter-finals
Limerick	4-18
Waterford	0-12
Kerry	3-22
Clare	1-11

Semi-finals
Cork	1-16
Limerick	0-11
Tipperary	1-8
Kerry	1-19

Final
Cork	1-9
Kerry	4-22

25 July 2021; 16:00 IST (UTC+1); Munster Final	Kerry	4–22 – 1–9	Cork	Fitzgerald Stadium, Killarney; Attendance: 2,500; Referee: Barry Cassidy (Bellaghy, Derry)
25 July 2021; 16:00 IST (UTC+1); Munster Final	Sean O’Shea 1–6 (0-3f), Paul Geaney 2–1, Paudie Clifford 0–3, Brian Ó Beaglaoich 1–0, Jack Barry, Killian Spillane, Tom O’Sullivan 0–2 each, Mike Breen, David Moran, David Clifford (0-1f), Stephen O’Brien, Tadhg Morley, Tommy Walsh 0–1 each.	Report	Brian Hurley 1–3 (0-1f), Michael Hurley 0–2, Brian Hartnett, Ian Maguire, Luke Connolly, Daniel Dineen (0–1 mark) 0–1 each.	Fitzgerald Stadium, Killarney; Attendance: 2,500; Referee: Barry Cassidy (Bellaghy, Derry)

=== Ulster Senior Football Championship ===
An open draw was held on 20 April 2021 with the provision that Cavan, Derry, Monaghan and Tyrone cannot be placed in the preliminary round.

Preliminary round
Down	1-12
Donegal	2-25

Quarter-finals
Armagh	4-15
Antrim	0-14
Monaghan	1-21
Fermanagh	0-14
Tyrone	1-18
Cavan	0-13
Derry	0-15
Donegal	0-16

Semi-finals
Armagh	2-21
Monaghan	4-17
Tyrone	0-23
Donegal	1-14

Final
Monaghan	0-15
Tyrone	0-16

31 July 2021; 16:00; Ulster Final	Monaghan	0–15 – 0–16	Tyrone	Croke Park, Dublin; Attendance: 18,000
31 July 2021; 16:00; Ulster Final	Conor McManus 0–4 (0-3f), Jack McCarron (0-1m) and Rory Beggan (0-2f) 0–2 each, Conor Boyle, Kieran Duffy, Killian Lavelle, Michael Bannigan, Conor McCarthy and Colin Walshe (0-1m) 0–1 each.	Report	Darren McCurry 0–5 (0-2f, 0-1m), Mattie Donnelly 0–3 (0-1f), Mark Bradley 0–2, Padraig Hampsey, Michael McKiernan, Niall Sludden, Peter Harte, Kieran McGeary and Cathal McShane 0–1 each.	Croke Park, Dublin; Attendance: 18,000

== All-Ireland Series ==
=== Bracket ===
Semi-Finals
Mayo (a.e.t.)	0–17
Dublin	0–14
Kerry	0–22
Tyrone	3–14

Final
Mayo	0–15
Tyrone	2–14

=== Semi-finals ===
RTÉ
Sky Sports

14 August 2021
18:00 IST (UTC+1)
Semi-final

Report

Mayo	0–17 – 0–14 (a.e.t.)	Dublin
(HT: 0–4 – 0–10)
Pts: Ryan O'Donoghue 5 (2f), Tommy Conroy and Robert Hennelly (2f, 1 '45) 0–3 each, Darren Coen, Jason Flynn, Kevin McLoughlin, Lee Keegan, Conor Loftus, Mattie Ruane 1 each		Pts: Dean Rock 7 (5f), Ciarán Kilkenny 3 (1m), Paddy Small 2, Con O'Callaghan and Seán Bugler 1 each

Croke Park, Dublin
Referee: Conor Lane (Cork)
Attendance: 24,000

RTÉ
Sky Sports

28 August 2021 (Note: The game between Kerry and Tyrone was initially due to be played on 15 August 2021, but was rescheduled to 21 August due to COVID-19 issues. Tyrone subsequently stated that they were unable to play on 21 August as several players had contracted COVID-19. It was eventually rescheduled to 28 August.)
15:30 IST (UTC+1)
Semi-final

Report

Kerry	0–22 (22) – (23) 3–14 (a.e.t.)	Tyrone
(HT: 0-09 (9) – (10) 1-07)
Pts: David Clifford 8 (3f, 1m), Seán O’Shea 8 (6f, 1 '45), Paudie Clifford 2, Paul Murphy, Diarmuid O’Connor, Paul Geaney, Tom O’Sullivan 1 each		Gls: Cathal McShane 1, Tiarnan McCann 1, Conor McKenna 1 Pts: Cathal McShane 3 (1f), Darren McCurry 4 (2f), Niall Morgan 2 (1 ’45, 1f), Michael McKernan, Ronan McNamee, Pádraig Hampsey, Peter Harte, Mattie Donnelly (1 m) 1 each

Croke Park, Dublin
Referee: David Coldrick (Meath)
Attendance: 24,000

=== Final ===
RTÉ
Sky Sports

11 September 2021 (Note: Due to COVID-19 issues, the final was due to be played on 29 August 2021, but was postponed to 4 September and again to 11 September.)
17:00 IST (UTC+1)
All-Ireland Final

Report

Tyrone	2–14 (20) – (15) 0–15	Mayo
(HT: 0–10 – 0-08)
Gls: Darren McCurry 1, Cathal McShane 1 Pts: Darren McCurry 4 (2f), Niall Morgan 3 (2f, 1 '45), Niall Sludden 2, Pádraig Hampsey, Peter Harte (1 mark), Kieran McGeary, Mattie Donnelly, Darragh Canavan 1 each		Pts: Ryan O'Donoghue 8 (7f), Tommy Conroy 2, Robbie Hennelly (1f), Lee Keegan, Patrick Durcan, Stephen Coen, Kevin McLoughlin 1 each

Croke Park, Dublin
Referee: Joe McQuillan (Cavan)
Attendance: 41,150

== Stadia and locations ==
Locations of stadia used during the championship

Stadia
County	Location	Stadium	Capacity
Cavan	Cavan	Breffni Park	32,000
Cork	Cork	Páirc Uí Chaoimh	45,000
Derry	Derry	Celtic Park	22,000
Donegal	Ballybofey	MacCumhaill Park	18,000
Fermanagh	Enniskillen	Brewster Park	20,000
Dublin	Drumcondra	Croke Park	82,300
Galway	Galway	Pearse Stadium	26,197
Laois	Portlaoise	O'Moore Park	27,000
Leitrim	Carrick-on-Shannon	Páirc Seán Mac Diarmada	9,331
Mayo	Castlebar	McHale Park	25,369
Monaghan	Clones	St Tiernach's Park	36,000
Offaly	Tullamore	O'Connor Park	20,000
Roscommon	Roscommon	Dr Hyde Park	25,000
Tipperary	Thurles	Semple Stadium	45,690
Waterford	Dungarvan	Fraher Field	15,000
Westmeath	Mullingar	Cusack Park	11,000
Wexford	Wexford	Wexford Park	20,000

== Referees panel ==
Championship Panel
Name	County	Club	Matches refereed
BRANAGAN, Ciarán	Down	Clonduff	
CASSIDY, Barry	Derry	Bellaghy	
CAWLEY, Brendan	Kildare	Sarsfields	
COLDRICK, David	Meath	Blackhall Gaels	
CULLEN, Niall	Fermanagh	Erne Gaels	
DEEGAN, Maurice	Laois	Stradbally	
FALOON, Paul	Down	Drumgath	
GOUGH, David	Meath	Slane	
HENRY, Jerome	Mayo	Castlebar Mitchels	
HURSON, Sean	Tyrone	Galbally Pearses	
KELLY, Fergal	Longford	Ballymahon	
LANE, Conor	Cork	Banteer	
MCNALLY, Martin	Monaghan	Corduff	
MCQUILLAN, Joe	Cavan	Kill Shamrocks	
O'MAHONEY, Derek	Tipperary	Ardfinnan	

== Statistics ==
- All scores correct as of 13 September 2021.

=== Top scorer: overall ===
Rank	Player	County	Tally	Total	Matches	Average
1	Seán O'Shea	Kerry	2–29	35	4	8.7
2	Darren McCurry	Tyrone	1–30	33	5	6.6
3	Ryan O'Donoghue	Mayo	2–27	33	5	6.6
4	David Clifford	Kerry	2–17	23	4	5.7
5	Cormac Costello	Dublin	1–15	18	3	6.0
6	Neil Flynn	Kildare	1–15	18	3	6.0
7	Conor McManus	Monaghan	1–15	18	3	6.0
8	Darren McHale	Mayo	3-07	16	4	4.0
9	Paddy McBrearty	Donegal	1–13	16	3	5.3
10	Tommy Conroy	Mayo	1–12	15	4	3.7
11	Dean Rock	Dublin	0–15	15	4	3.7
12	Cian Farrell	Offaly	0–15	15	2	7.5
13	Cathal McShane	Tyrone	2-08	14	5	2.8
14	Rian O'Neill	Armagh	1–11	14	2	7.0
15	Hugh Bourke	Limerick	1–11	14	2	7.0
16	Ciarán Kilkenny	Dublin	0–13	13	4	3.2
17	John Heslin	Westmeath	0–13	13	2	6.5
18	Mark Rossiter	Wexford	1-09	12	2	6.0
19	Brian Hurley	Cork	1-09	12	2	6.0
20	Lorcan Dolan	Westmeath	1-08	11	2	5.5

=== Top scorer: single game ===
Rank	Player	County	Tally	Total	Opposition
1	Darren McCurry	Tyrone	0–10	10	Cavan
2	Seán O'Shea	Kerry	1-07	10	Clare

=== Scoring events ===
All records exclude extra-time.

- Widest winning margin: 24 points
  - Mayo 5–20 – 0–11 Leitrim (Connacht semi-final)
- Most goals in a match: 6
  - Monaghan 4–17 – 2–21 Armagh (Ulster semi-final)
- Most points in a match: 38
  - Longford 0–25 – 2–13 Carlow (Leinster preliminary round)
  - Monaghan 4–17 – 2–21 Armagh (Ulster semi-final)
- Most goals by one team in a match: 5
  - Mayo 5–20 – 0–11 Leitrim (Connacht semi-final)
- Most points by one team in a match: 25
  - Down 1–12 – 2–25 Donegal (Ulster preliminary round)
  - Longford 0–25 – 2–13 Carlow (Leinster preliminary round)
- Highest aggregate score: 56 points
  - Monaghan 4–17 – 2–21 Armagh (Ulster semi-final)
- Lowest aggregate score: 22 points
  - Dublin 0–15 – 0–07 Wexford (Leinster quarter-final)

=== Miscellaneous ===
- Leitrim's 24-point loss to Mayo was their joint-biggest championship defeat, equalling a 1973 match, also against Mayo, that ended 7–6 to 0–3.
- COVID-19 caused the Connacht final and Ulster Final to move from MacHale Park, Castlebar or St Tiernach's Park, Clones to Croke Park, Dublin for first time since 1922 for Connacht and 2006 for Ulster. Sligo do return to Connacht championship. The return of London and New York to the Connacht championship was postponed until 2022.
- Dublin's extended winning record gives them 11 Leinster titles in a row.
- Dublin's record-breaking unbeaten streak of 45 consecutive championship games (42 wins, 3 draws) was ended by Mayo in the All Ireland semi-final. Their previous championship defeat was back in 2014, against Donegal. Dublin's unprecedented title streak (a six-in-a-row, 2015–20), came to an end also.

== Awards ==
=== The Sunday Game Team of the Year ===
The Sunday Game team of the year was picked on 11 September, the night of the final. Kieran McGeary was chosen as the Footballer of the Year by the RTÉ panel.

Player	Team
Niall Morgan	Tyrone
Paddy Durcan	Mayo
Lee Keegan	Mayo
Pádraig Hampsey	Tyrone
Niall Sludden	Tyrone
Kieran McGeary^{FOTY}	Tyrone
Peter Harte	Tyrone
Matthew Ruane	Mayo
Conn Kilpatrick	Tyrone
Conor Meyler	Tyrone
Paudie Clifford	Kerry
Ciarán Kilkenny	Dublin
Darren McCurry	Tyrone
David Clifford	Kerry
Tommy Conroy	Mayo

=== All Star Team of the Year ===
The All Star Team of the Year team of the year was picked on 10 December. Kieran McGeary was named as the All Stars Footballer of the Year, with Mayo's Oisín Mullin picked as the All Stars Young Footballer of the Year.

Pos.	Player	Team	Appearances
GK	Niall Morgan	Tyrone	1
RCB	Pádraig Hampsey	Tyrone	2
FB	Lee Keegan	Mayo	5
LCB	Tom O'Sullivan	Kerry	2
RWB	Conor Meyler	Tyrone	1
CB	Kieran McGeary^{FOTY}	Tyrone	1
LWB	Peter Harte	Tyrone	2
MD	Brian Kennedy	Tyrone	1
MD	Matthew Ruane	Mayo	1
RWF	Niall Sludden	Tyrone	1
CF	Paudie Clifford	Kerry	1
LWF	Ciarán Kilkenny	Dublin	5
RCF	Darren McCurry	Tyrone	1
FF	David Clifford	Kerry	3
LCF	Ryan O'Donoghue	Mayo	1

Player has previously been selected.
