= Jody O'Neill =

Northern Irish Gaelic footballer and manager (1936–2024)

Personal information
- Native name: Seosamh Ó Néill (Irish)
- Nickname: Jody
- Born: 17 August 1936 Coalisland, County Tyrone, Northern Ireland
- Died: 3 August 2024 (aged 87) Coalisland, County Tyrone, Northern Ireland
- Occupation: Pharmacist

Sport
- Sport: Gaelic football
- Position: Midfield
Club
- Years: Club
- 1952-1970: Coalisland Na Fianna
Club titles
- Tyrone titles: 1
Inter-county
- Years: County
- 1952–1968: Tyrone
Inter-county titles
- Ulster titles: 2
- All-Irelands: 0
- NFL: 0

Hugh Joseph O'Neill (17 August 1936 – 3 August 2024), known as Jody O'Neill, was a Gaelic footballer and manager from Northern Ireland. At club level he played with Coalisland Na Fianna and at inter-county level with the Tyrone senior football team.

== Playing career ==
O'Neill first played Gaelic football to a high standard as a student at St Patrick's Academy in Dungannon. He was part of the first team to have success for the school when the Corn na nÓg title was claimed, while he also earned selection to the Ulster Colleges team. He later studied at the College of Technology in Belfast but declined an offer from Queen's University to line out with them in the Sigerson Cup. By that stage O'Neill had begun his club career with Coalisland Na Fianna. He won two Tyrone MFC medals in 1950 and 1952, before winning his sole Tyrone SFC medal in 1955.

O'Neill first appeared on the inter-county scene with Tyrone as a member of the minor team in 1951. It was the first of four successive years with the under-18 team before later lining out with the junior team. O'Neill began his association with the senior team in 1952. He was just 19 when he captained Tyrone to their very first Ulster SFC title in 1956. O'Neill won a second successive provincial title in 1957, as well as claiming Dr McKenna Cup and Dr Lagan Cup successes. He retired from inter-county activity in 1968 after serving as player-manager for his last season with the team.

O'Neill's inter-county performances earned his inclusion on the Ulster inter-provincial team on 10 occasions. His five Railway Cup wins came in 1960, 1963, 1964, 1965 and 1966.

== Management career ==
O'Neill first became involved in team management in the twilight of his inter-county playing career. He managed the Tyrone junior team to the All-Ireland JFC title in 1968. He also took charge of the Tyrone senior team for the first time that year. O'Neill's team claimed their first Ulster SFC since his own playing days in 1973. He also served as under-21 team manager at this time and secured back-to-back Ulster U21FC titles in 1972 and 1973. O'Neill stepped down from his position in 1975, before returning for a second stint as manager between 1977 and 1980. He later returned or a second spell as under-21 manager.

O'Neill was also heavily involved in coaching and management at club level with Coalisland Na Fianna. He guided the club's minor team to Tyrone MFC titles in 1985, 1991 and 1995. O'Neill was appointed co-selector for Ireland's successful three-game test against Australia in the 1986 International Rules Series.

== Death ==
O'Neill died on 3 August 2024, at the age of 87.

== Honours ==
=== Player ===
St Patrick's Academy

- Corn na nÓg: 1952 (c)

Coalisland Na Fianna

- Tyrone Senior Football Championship: 1955
- Tyrone Minor Football Championship: 1950, 1952

Tyrone

- Ulster Senior Football Championship: 1956 (c), 1957
- Dr McKenna Cup: 1957
- Dr Lagan Cup: 1957, 1958

Ulster

- Railway Cup: 1960, 1963, 1964, 1965, 1966

=== Management ===
Coalisland Na Fianna

- Tyrone Minor Football Championship: 1985, 1991, 1995

Tyrone

- Ulster Senior Football Championship: 1973
- All-Ireland Junior Football Championship: 1968
- Ulster Junior Football Championship: 1968
- Ulster Under-21 Football Championship: 1972, 1973

Sporting positions
Preceded by	Tyrone senior football team captain 1956	Succeeded by Eddie Devlin
Preceded by	Tyrone senior football team manager 1968-1975	Succeeded by Tom McKeagney
Preceded by Tom McKeagney	Tyrone senior football team manager 1977-1980	Succeeded by Art McRory
