= Kieran McGeary =

Tyrone Gaelic footballer

Personal information
- Native name: Ciarán Mac Gabhra (Irish)
- Born: 1994 (age 31–32)
- Occupation: Teacher

Sport
- Sport: Gaelic football
- Position: Left half back
Club
- Years: Club
- Pomeroy
College
- Years: College
- St Mary's University College
College titles
- Sigerson titles: 1
Inter-county
- Years: County
- 2016–: Tyrone
Inter-county titles
- Ulster titles: 3
- All-Irelands: 1
- All Stars: 1

Kieran McGeary is an Irish Gaelic footballer who plays for the Pomeroy club and the Tyrone county team. Following Tyrone's All-Ireland win in 2021, he was picked by the Sunday Game panel as the footballer of the year. In December 2021, he won his first All-Star Award and was also named as the GAA/GPA Footballer of the Year.

== Honours ==
Tyrone

- All-Ireland Senior Football Championship (1): 2021
- Ulster Senior Football Championship (3): 2016, 2017, 2021
- All-Ireland Under-21 Football Championship (1): 2015 (c)
- Ulster Under-21 Football Championship (1): 2015 (c)
- Ulster Minor Football Championship (1): 2012

Pomeroy

- Ulster Intermediate Club Football Championship (1): 2016
- Tyrone Intermediate Football Championship (2): 2016, 2023

St Mary's University College

- Sigerson Cup (1): 2017

Individual

- GAA/GPA Footballer of the Year (1): 2021
- All Star Award (1): 2021
- The Sunday Game Footballer of the Year (1): 2021
- The Sunday Game Team of the Year (1): 2021

Achievements
Preceded by Jack McCaffrey (Dublin)	All-Ireland Under-21 Football Final winning captain 2015	Succeeded by Stephen Coen (Mayo)
Awards
Preceded by Brian Fenton (Dublin)	GAA/GPA Footballer of the Year; 2021	Succeeded by David Clifford (Kerry)
