= Seán O'Shea =

Kerry Gaelic footballer

Personal information
- Native name: Seán Ó Sé (Irish)
- Nickname: Seánie
- Born: 17 July 1998 (age 28) Cork, Ireland
- Occupation: Secondary school teacher
- Height: 5 ft 11 in (180 cm)

Sport
- Sport: Gaelic football
- Position: Centre-forward
Club
- Years: Club
- Kenmare Shamrocks
Club titles
- Kerry titles: 0
College
- Years: College
- University College Cork
College titles
- Sigerson titles: 1
Inter-county*
| Years | County | Apps (scores) |
| 2018– | Kerry | 46 (7–254) |
Inter-county titles
- Munster titles: 7
- All-Irelands: 2
- NFL: 4
- All Stars: 4
- *Inter County team apps and scores correct as of 21:28, 07 November 2025.

Seán O'Shea (Irish: Seán Ó Sé) (born 17 July 1998) is an Irish Gaelic footballer who plays for Kerry SFC club Kenmare Shamrocks and at inter-county level with the Kerry senior football team. He usually lines out as a forward.

== Career ==
O'Shea played Gaelic football at juvenile and underage levels with the Kenmare Shamrocks club. He eventually progressed onto the club's intermediate team and scored 1-05 when the club won the Munster Intermediate Club Football Championship title in 2016. O'Shea first appeared on the inter-county scene during a two year-stint with the Kerry minor football team. He won consecutive All-Ireland Minor Football Championships during this time, including one as captain of the team in 2016. He subsequently progressed onto the under-21 team and also won a Sigerson Cup title with University College Cork in 2019. O'Shea made his debut with the Kerry senior football team during the 2018 National League. His immediately established himself on the team and was named Young Footballer of the Year in 2019. O'Shea's other honours include two All Ireland Senior Football Championships, seven Munster Senior Football Championships and four National Football League titles.

On 10th July 2022, in the All-Ireland Football semi-final against Dublin, O'Shea scored a 53m free with the last kick of the game to win the game for Kerry, 1-14 to 1-13 and qualify for the 2022 All-Ireland Final.

He captained Kerry in the 2022 All-Ireland season and lifted the Sam Maguire Cup, following the county's victory over Galway in the All-Ireland Senior Football Championship Final.

== Career statistics ==
As of match played 27 July 2025.

| Team | Year | National League | | | Munster | | All-Ireland | | Total | |
| Team | Year | Division | Apps | Score | Apps | Score | Apps | Score | Apps | Score |
|---|---|---|---|---|---|---|---|---|---|---|
| Kerry | 2018 | Division 1 | 5 | 0-20 | 2 | 0-11 | 3 | 0-13 | 10 | 0-44 |
| Kerry | 2019 | Division 1 | 8 | 1-55 | 2 | 0-13 | 6 | 1-40 | 16 | 2-108 |
| Kerry | 2020 | Division 1 | 6 | 2-27 | 1 | 0-02 | — | | 7 | 2-29 |
| Kerry | 2021 | Division 1 | 4 | 0-14 | 3 | 2-21 | 1 | 0-08 | 8 | 2-43 |
| Kerry | 2022 | Division 1 | 4 | 1-17 | 2 | 0-16 | 3 | 1-10 | 9 | 2-43 |
| Kerry | 2023 | Division 1 | 5 | 1-12 | 2 | 0-09 | 6 | 2-30 | 13 | 3-51 |
| Kerry | 2024 | Division 1 | 7 | 0-31 | 2 | 0-15 | 5 | 0-16 | 14 | 0-62 |
| Kerry | 2025 | Division 1 | 3 | 0-17 | 2 | 1-09 | 6 | 0-41 | 11 | 1-67 |
| Career total | | | 42 | 5-193 | 16 | 3-96 | 30 | 4-158 | 69 | 12-447 |

== Honours ==
University College Cork

- Sigerson Cup: 2019

Kenmare Shamrocks

- Munster Intermediate Club Football Championship: 2016
- Kerry Intermediate Football Championship: 2016

Kerry

- All-Ireland Senior Football Championship (2): 2022 (c), 2025
- Munster Senior Football Championship (7): 2018, 2019, 2021, 2022 (c), 2023, 2024, 2025
- National Football League (4): 2020, 2021, 2022, 2025
- McGrath Cup: 2022 (c)
- Munster Under-21 Football Championship: 2017
- All-Ireland Minor Football Championship: 2015, 2016 (c)
- Munster Minor Football Championship: 2015, 2016 (c)

Individual

- GAA GPA All Stars Awards (4): 2019, 2022, 2023, 2025
- The Sunday Game Team of the Year (4): 2019, 2022, 2023, 2025

Sporting positions
| Preceded by Mark O'Connor | Kerry minor football team captain 2016 | Succeeded by David Clifford |

Awards and achievements
| Preceded by Mark O'Connor | All-Ireland MFC winning captain 2016 | Succeeded by David Clifford |
Awards
| Preceded by David Clifford | GAA/GPA Young Footballer of the Year; 2019 | Succeeded by Oisín Mullin |
Achievements
| Preceded by Pádraig Hampsey (Tyrone) | All-Ireland Senior Football Final winning captain 2022 | Succeeded by Incumbent |
