= Sludden =

The first recordings of the surname Sludden exists in Ireland. Some moved during the years of the famine to Scotland, England and America.

The earliest record of the Sludden family in Scotland descends from Edward and Sarah (McSorley) from Co. Tyrone in N. Ireland. They came to Gartcosh, Lanarkshire around 1840 with their two children Cormick and Sarah. Cormick married Ann (Ward) and they had twelve recorded children, eleven of whom reached adulthood. Predominantly, all Sluddens in the Scottish line come from Cormick.

James Sludden (born ??) from Tyrone married Teresa Hunter. They had four known children: John J(ames), Charles, Elizabeth and Annie. It is believed that all remained in Ireland with the exception of John J. who married Elizabeth Ann McMullen and moved to Pittsburgh, Pennsylvania, US, crossing from Liverpool on board the Celtic in 1921. Along with an Ann Sludden who emigrated to Massachusetts with her three-month-old child (sex unknown), the five children of John J. Sludden and Ann McMullen form the Sludden descendency lines within the United States. There are 3 Sludden Children who are the sons of John J. & Elizabeth A.: Henry who Married Lillian, known as Harry, Charles who married Margaret Flaherty and had 4 children, (Margaret Frances., Mary Ann, Charles J. JR & Elizabeth A), James is the youngest son of John J. & Elizabeth.

Around 1840 when Edward Sludden moved to Scotland, it is also understood that some other members of the Sludden family moved to Yorkshire, Somerset, Corby and London.

== Other References to Sludden ==
The Scottish author and playwright Alasdair Gray references the name Sludden as one of his predominant characters in his first novel Lanark.

== Notable people ==
- John Sludden (1964–2021), Scottish footballer and manager
- Niall Sludden, Irish Gaelic footballer
