= Armagh–Tyrone Gaelic football rivalry =

Armagh-Tyrone
- Location: County Armagh; County Tyrone
- Teams: Armagh; Tyrone
- First meeting: Armagh 2-8 - 1-2 Tyrone; 1890 Ulster final (12 October 1890)
- Latest meeting: Armagh 0-23 0-22 Tyrone; 2025 Ulster semi-final (26 April 2025)

Statistics
- Total meetings: 45

The Armagh–Tyrone rivalry is a Gaelic football rivalry between Irish county teams Armagh and Tyrone, who first played each other in 1890. It is considered to be one of the biggest rivalries in Gaelic games. Armagh's home ground is the Athletic Grounds and Tyrone's home ground is Healy Park.

Tyrone have won the Ulster Championship on 16 occasions, whereas Armagh have won the title 14 times, placing them third and fourth on the roll of honour respectively.

The sides also contested the 2003 All-Ireland Senior Football Championship final, the first time that two counties from the same province contested the football showpiece.

== All-time results ==
=== Legend ===
| Tyrone win |
| Armagh win |
| Match was a draw |

=== Senior Championship meetings ===
| No. | Date | Winners | Score | Runners-up | Venue | Stage |
|---|---|---|---|---|---|---|
| 1. | 12 October 1890 | Armagh | 2-8 - 1-2 | Tyrone | Blaris, Lisburn | Ulster final |
| 2. | 3 January 1904 | Armagh | 0-3 - 0-2 | Tyrone | | Ulster semi-final |
| 3. | 31 January 1904 | Armagh | 1-6 - 1-3 | Tyrone | Belfast | Ulster semi-final replay |
| 4. | 1904 | Armagh | 0-12 - 0-3 | Tyrone | Castleblaney | Ulster semi-final |
| 5. | 1904 | Armagh | 0-24 - 0-13 | Tyrone | Armagh | Ulster semi-final replay |
| 6. | 13 May 1917 | Armagh | 0-9 - 0-6 | Tyrone | Armagh | Ulster quarter-final |
| 7. | 16 May 1920 | Armagh | 2-1 - 0-0 | Tyrone | Dungannon | Ulster quarter-final |
| 8. | 25 May 1930 | Armagh | 2-3 - 2-3 | Tyrone | Dungannon | Ulster quarter-final |
| 9. | 10 April 1932 | Armagh | 1-5 - 1-4 | Tyrone | Letterkenny | Ulster quarter-final |
| 10. | 8 June 1941 | Armagh | 4-8 - 1-17 | Tyrone | Athletic Grounds | Ulster quarter-final |
| 11. | 31 May 1942 | Armagh | 3-4 - 0-0 | Tyrone | Athletic Grounds | Ulster quarter-final |
| 12. | 24 June 1945 | Armagh | 3-13 - 0-2 | Tyrone | Athletic Grounds | Ulster quarter-final |
| 13. | 22 June 1947 | Armagh | 1-6 - 1-6 | Tyrone | Athletic Grounds | Ulster quarter-final |
| 14. | 29 June 1947 | Tyrone | 2-5 - 1-4 | Armagh | O'Neill Park | Ulster quarter-final replay |
| 15. | 17 June 1951 | Armagh | 7-13 - 2-3 | Tyrone | Athletic Grounds | Ulster quarter-final |
| 16. | 15 June 1952 | Armagh | 1-8 - 1-6 | Tyrone | O'Neill Park | Ulster quarter-final |
| 17. | 30 June 1957 | Tyrone | 2-9 - 3-5 | Armagh | The Playing Fields | Ulster quarter-final |
| 18. | 22 June 1958 | Tyrone | 1-9 - 0-10 | Armagh | O'Neill Park | Ulster quarter-final |
| 19. | 6 June 1971 | Armagh | 4-9 - 2-10 | Tyrone | The Playing Fields | Ulster quarter-final |
| 20. | 4 June 1972 | Tyrone | 0-13 - 1-7 | Armagh | O'Neill Park | Ulster quarter-final |
| 21. | 20 July 1980 | Armagh | 4-10 - 4-7 | Tyrone | St. Tiernach's Park | Ulster final |
| 22. | 15 July 1984 | Tyrone | 0-15 - 1-7 | Armagh | St. Tiernach's Park | Ulster final |
| 23. | 28 June 1987 | Armagh | 5-9 - 1-9 | Tyrone | St. Molaise Park | Ulster semi-final |
| 24. | 26 June 1988 | Tyrone | 0-15 - 1-8 | Armagh | St. Molaise Park | Ulster semi-final |
| 25. | 4 June 1989 | Tyrone | 1-11 - 2-7 | Armagh | Healy Park | Ulster quarter-final |
| 26. | 3 June 1990 | Armagh | 0-12 - 0-11 | Tyrone | Athletic Grounds | Ulster quarter-final |
| 27. | 13 June 1993 | Armagh | 0-13 - 1-10 | Tyrone | Athletic Grounds | Ulster quarter-final |
| 28. | 20 June 1993 | Armagh | 0-12 - 2-8 | Tyrone | Healy Park | Ulster quarter-final replay |
| 29. | 12 June 1994 | Tyrone | 3-10 - 1-10 | Armagh | Healy Park | Ulster quarter-final |
| 30. | 15 June 1997 | Tyrone | 1-12 - 0-12 | Armagh | Healy Park | Ulster quarter-final |
| 31. | 4 June 2000 | Armagh | 0-12 - 0-8 | Tyrone | St Tiernach's Park | Ulster quarter-final |
| 32. | 20 May 2001 | Tyrone | 1-14 - 1-9 | Armagh | St Tiernach's Park | Ulster quarter-final |
| 33. | 19 May 2002 | Tyrone | 1-12 - 1-12 | Armagh | St Tiernach's Park | Ulster quarter-final |
| 34. | 26 May 2002 | Armagh | 2-13 - 0-16 | Tyrone | St Tiernach's Park | Ulster quarter-final replay |
| 35. | 28 September 2003 | Tyrone | 0-12 - 0-9 | Armagh | Croke Park | All Ireland final |
| 36. | 10 July 2005 | Armagh | 2-8 - 0-14 | Tyrone | Croke Park | Ulster final |
| 37. | 23 July 2005 | Armagh | 0-13 - 0-11 | Tyrone | Croke Park | Ulster final replay |
| 38. | 4 September 2005 | Tyrone | 2-10 - 1-10 | Armagh | Croke Park | All Ireland semi-final |
| 39. | 31 May 2009 | Tyrone | 2-10 - 1-10 | Armagh | St. Tiernach's Park | Ulster quarter-final |
| 40. | 10 June 2012 | Tyrone | 0-19 - 1-13 | Armagh | Athletic Grounds | Ulster quarter-final |
| 41. | 13 July 2014 | Armagh | 0-13 - 0-10 | Tyrone | Healy Park | All Ireland Qualifier Round 2 |
| 42. | 5 August 2017 | Tyrone | 3-17 - 0-8 | Armagh | Croke Park | All Ireland quarter-final |
| 43 | 5 June 2022 | Armagh | 1-16 - 1-10 | Tyrone | Athletic Grounds | All Ireland Qualifier Round 1 |
| 44 | 3 June 2023 | Tyrone | 0-13 - 0-11 | Armagh | Healy Park | All Ireland Group Stage |
| 45 | 26 April 2025 | Armagh | 0-23 - 0-22 | Tyrone | St Tiernach's Park | Ulster semi-final |
| 46 | 12 April 2026 | Armagh | - | Tyrone | Athletic Grounds | Ulster preliminary-round |

== Miscellaneous ==
- The sides have contested four Ulster finals, the first in 1890 and the most recent in 2005. Armagh have won three of these games whilst Tyrone have one victory.
- Longest winning streak - Armagh - 7 games (12 October 1890 - 16 May 1920)
- Longest unbeaten streak - Armagh - 13 games (12 October 1890 - 29 June 1947)
- Highest total score (pre-FRC) - 43 points (17 June 1951 Armagh 7-13 - 2-3 Tyrone)
- Highest total score (post-FRC) - 45 points (26 April 2025 Armagh 0-23 - 0-22 Tyrone)
- Highest winning margin - 34 points (17 June 1951 Armagh 7-13 - 2-3 Tyrone)
