= Brian Kennedy (Gaelic footballer) =

Gaelic footballer

Brian Kennedy (Brian O'Cinnéide) is a Gaelic footballer who plays for the Derrylaughan Kevin Barrys GAC club and the Tyrone county team. Born on 31st March, 1998 Captained Tyrone for 2025.

== Honours ==
Tyrone

- All-Ireland Senior Football Championship (1): 2021
- Ulster Senior Football Championship (1): 2021

Individual

- All Star Award (1): 2021
