= 2015 All-Ireland Minor Football Championship =

Gaelic football competition

2015 All-Ireland Senior Football Championship
Championship details
- Dates: April — 20 September 2015
- Teams: 31

All-Ireland Champions
- Winning team: Kerry (13th win)

All-Ireland Finalists
- Losing team: Tipperary

Provincial Champions
- Munster: Kerry
- Leinster: Kildare
- Ulster: Derry
- Connacht: Galway

Championship statistics

The 2015 All-Ireland Minor Football Championship is the GAA's premier inter-county Gaelic football competition for under 18's. 31 teams take part.

The defending champions were Kerry who defeated Donegal in the 2014 final.

Kerry retained their title with a comprehensive 4-14 to 0-06 win over Munster rivals Tipperary.

== Teams ==
A total of 31 teams will contest the championship. Kilkenny, New York and London do not participate in the competition.

== Format ==
Connacht, Leinster, Munster and Ulster organise four provincial championships on a knock-out basis. The four provincial winners play the four provincial runners-up in the All-Ireland Quarter-finals.

== Fixtures and results ==
=== Connacht Minor Football Championship ===
Quarter-Finals
Leitrim	0-12
Sligo	4-09

Semi-Finals
Sligo	1-14
Roscommon	3-5
Mayo	1-3
Galway	3-14

Munster Final
Sligo (R)	1-04; 1-08
Galway (R)	0-07; 4-12

19 July 2015
2.00 PM
Final

Sligo	1-04 - 0-07	Galway
Patrick O’Connor 1-0, Liam Gaughan 0-3 (0-2f); Darragh Cummins 0-1.	Report	Finian O Laoi 0-3; Colm O’Braonain 0-2; Eric Lee 0-1, Cillian McDaid 0-1.

Dr. Hyde Park, Roscommon
24 July 2015
7.00 PM
Final replay

Sligo	1-08 - 4-12	Galway
C Herron 1-0, L Gaughan 0-3 (2f), F Cawley 0-2 (1f), N Rooney 0-1 (1f), K Cawley 0-1, A McLoughlin 0-1.	Report	P McCormack 1-2 (1f), S Kelly 1-1, C McDaid 0-3 (2f), F Ó Laoi 1-0, D Connelly 1-0, J Daly 0-2 (1f), E Lee 0-1 (1 ’45), C Marsden 0-1 (1f), C Ryan 0-1, C Brady 0-1.

Tuam Stadium, Tuam

=== Leinster Minor Football Championship ===
Preliminary round
Wicklow	1-08
Longford	1-14
Laois	2-08
Meath	1-17
Kildare	2-11
Louth	2-14
Wexford	2-14
Westmeath	2-14
Dublin	2-11
Offaly	1-09

Quarter-Finals
Carlow	1-09
Longford	1-14
Meath	0-12
Louth	0-11
Wexford	0-11
Dublin	3-08
Kildare*	1-10
Laois*	1-09

Semi-Finals
Longford	1-09
Meath	0-08
Dublin	3-13
Kildare	3-16

Leinster Final
Longford	1-09
Kildare	2-15

LOSERS ROUND - The five losers from the preliminary round play-off and two teams advance to the Leinster Quarter-final

Losers Round One
Offaly	2-13
Westmeath	1-10

Losers Round Two
Offaly	0-13
Kildare	0-14
Laois	5-13
Wicklow	1-13

Leinster Quarter-final**
Kildare	1-10
Laois	1-09

12 July 2015
12.30 PM
Final

Longford	1-09 - 2-15	Kildare
Conor Berry 1-2, Jayson Matthews 0-2 (1f), Darragh Doherty, Rory Hawkins, Neil Devlin, Cian Finnan, Peter Lynn 0-1 each.	Report	Jimmy Hyland 0-8 (1f), Conor Hartley, Ciaran Kelly (1f) 1-1 each, Brian McLoughlin 0-2, Ethan O’Donohue, Matthew Kelly (1f), Aaron Murphy (1 45) 0-1 each.

Croke Park, Dublin

=== Munster Minor Football Championship ===
Quarter-Finals
Clare	0-03
Kerry	0-14
Cork	2-15
Limerick	2-07
Waterford	1-07
Tipperary	2-16

Semi-Finals
Kerry	0-16
Cork	1-12
Clare*	2-09
Tipperary	0-16

Munster Final
Kerry	2-14
Tipperary	1-11

Playoff Round

Clare were the winners of a playoff round between the quarter-final losers*

Playoff 1		Playoff 2
Limerick	2-14
Waterford	3-10	Limerick	0-05
		Clare	2-11

5 July 2015
12.30 PM
Final

Kerry	2-14 - 1-11	Tipperary
C Geaney 1-5 (1f), C Linnane 1-1 (1f), Michael Foley 0-2, Sean O’Shea 0-2 (1f), Jack Morgan 0-1, Gavin White 0-1, Bryan Sweeney 0-1, Stephen O’Sullivan 0-1	Report	Aidan Buckley 1-2, Alan Tynan 0-3 (2f), Jack Kennedy 0-2 (1f), Brendan Martin 0-2, Danny Owens 0-1, Mark Kehoe 0-1

Fitzgerald Stadium Killarney

=== Ulster Minor Football Championship ===
Preliminary round
Donegal	1-11
Tyrone	0-08

Quarter-Finals
Cavan	2-17
Monaghan	1-08
Fermanagh	2-09
Antrim	2-11
Derry	2-11
Down	1-07
Armagh	0-07
Donegal	2-14

Semi-Finals
Cavan	1-19
Antrim	1-11
Derry	0-11
Donegal	0-10

Ulster Final
Cavan	0-11
Derry	1-11

19 July 2015
12.30 PM
Final

Cavan	0-11 - 1-11	Derry
D Raythrorne (0-3), D Brady (0-2), D Gannon (0-3), T Donohoe (0-1), C Smith (0-2)	Report	P Kearney (0-3), S Downey (0-1), C Glass (0-1); T Flanagan (1-0), B Grant (0-1), S McGuigan (0-5)

St. Tiernach's Park, Clones

=== All-Ireland Knockout ===
Quarter-finals
1 August 2015 – Brewster Park
Derry	0-12
Longford	2-04
3 August 2015– O'Connor Park
Kerry	2-12
Sligo	1-06
1 August 2015– Páirc Tailteann
Kildare	2-14
Cavan	2-12
3 August 2015 – O'Connor Park
Galway	0-06
Tipperary	1-10

Semi-finals
23 August 2015 – Croke Park
Derry	1-06
Kerry	1-11
30 August 2015 – Croke Park
Kildare	0-09
Tipperary	0-11

Final
20 September 2015– Croke Park
Kerry	4-14
Tipperary	0-06

==== Quarter-finals ====
The four provincial champions play the four beaten finalists from the provincial championships.

1 August
2.00 PM
Quarter-Final

Derry	0-12 - 2-04	Longford
Shane McGuigan 0-7 (0-2f), Conor Glass (0-1f), Jack Doherty 0-2 each, Brian Cassidy 0-1.	Report	Conor Berry 1-3 (0-2f), Darragh Doherty 1-0, Ruairi Harkins 0-1

Brewster Park, Enniskillen

1 August
6.30 PM
Quarter-final

Kildare	2-14 - 2-12	Cavan
Ciaran Kelly (1-7, 5f), Jimmy Hyland (1-4, 1f), Rory Feely (0-1), Matthew Kelly (0-1), Ethan O’Donohue (0-1)	Report	Thomas Edward Donohoe (1-2), David Brady (0-3, 1f, 1 45), James Brady (1-0), Robbie Fitzpatrick (0-3, 2f), Darragh Gannon (0-2), Dillon Raythorne (0-2)

Páirc Tailteann, Navan

3 August
2.00 PM
Quarter-Final

Kerry	2-12 - 1-06	Sligo
C Geaney 1-4 (0-1f), B Ó’Seanacháin 1-0, S O’Shea (1f), G White and D O’Brien 0-2 each, JM Foley and R Buckley 0-1 each	Report	K Cawley 1-0, F Cawley (0-1f) & R Kennedy (0-1f) 0-2 each, L Gaughan & C Lally 0-1 each

O'Connor Park, Tullamore

3 August
4.00 PM
Quarter-final

Galway	0-06 - 1-10	Tipperary
Conor Marsden (0-2f), John Daly (0-1f) 0-2 each, Paudie McCormack and Eric Lee 0-1 each	Report	Alan Tynan 1-5 (0-2f, 0-1 ’45), Brendan Martin 0-2, Colin English, Jack Kennedy and Jamie Bergin 0-1 each.

O'Connor Park, Tullamore

==== Semi-finals ====
There is no draw for the semi-finals as the fixtures are pre-determined on a three yearly rotation. This rotation ensures that a provinces's champions play the champions of all the other provinces once every three years in the semi-finals if they each win their quarter-finals. If a provincial winner loses their quarter final, then the provincial runner-up who beat them takes their place in the semi-final.

23 August
1.30PM
Semi-Final

Derry	1-06 - 1-11	Kerry
Conor Maunsell 1-0, Shane McGuigan 0-2, Francis Kearney 0-2, Conor Glass 0-1, Niall McAtamney 0-1	Report	Michael Foley 1-3, John Mark Foley 0-3, Conor Geaney 0-5

Croke Park, Dublin
Referee: Jerome Henry (Mayo)

30 August
1.30PM
Semi-Final

Kildare	0-09 - 0-11	Tipperary
C Kelly 0-4 (4f), C Hartley 0-2, J Hyland 0-2 (2f), M Kelly 0-1	Report	J Kennedy 0-4 (1f, 1 '45'), A Tynan 0-3 (2f), B McGrath 0-1, B Martin 0-1, A Buckley 0-1, S Quirke 0-1

Croke Park, Dublin
Referee: Noel Mooney (Cavan)

==== Final ====
20 September
1.15PM
Final

Kerry	4-14 - 0-6	Tipperary
C Geaney 2-4 (2-0 pen, 1f); B Sweeney 1-1, Michael Foley 1-0, S O’Shea 0-2, J Duggan 0-2 (1f), M O’Connor 0-1, JM Foley 0-1, B Barrett 0-1, B Ó Seanacháin 0-1, S O’Sullivan 0-1.	Report	A Tynan 0-2, T Nolan 0-2, B McGrath 0-1, J Kennedy 0-1 (1 ’45’)

Croke Park, Dublin
Referee: David Gough (Meath)

== See also ==
- 2015 All-Ireland Senior Football Championship
- 2015 All-Ireland Under-21 Football Championship
