= Conor Meyler =

Tyrone Gaelic footballer (born 1994)

Personal information
- Native name: Conchúr Mac Maoilir (Irish)
- Born: 22 September 1994 (age 32)
- Occupation: Teacher

Sport
- Sport: Gaelic football
- Position: Right half-forward
Club
- Years: Club
- Omagh St Enda's
Club titles
- Tyrone titles: 2
College
- Years: College
- St Mary's University College
College titles
- Sigerson titles: 1
Inter-county
- Years: County
- 2015–2025: Tyrone
Inter-county titles
- Ulster titles: 3
- All-Irelands: 1
- All Stars: 1

I've learned to relax a wee bit going into games and kind of accepting [sic] fate – putting it in God's hands … putting notes into the team and putting in different podcasts and posts for the mental side for the boys… I'm detailed, I'm diligent, I'm intense…

— Meyler on himself

Conor Meyler (born 22 September 1994) is a former Gaelic footballer who played for the Omagh St Enda's club and the Tyrone county team.

Meyler was among those to test positive for COVID-19, causing two delays to the 2021 All-Ireland SFC semi-final against Kerry. Meyler said he was asymptomatic (or clinically silent) and his role in it would have stayed hidden if they had not forced him to undergo a PCR test.

== Honours ==
Tyrone

- All-Ireland Senior Football Championship (1): 2021
- Ulster Senior Football Championship (3): 2016, 2017, 2021
- All-Ireland Under-21 Football Championship (1): 2015
- Ulster Under-21 Football Championship (1): 2015

Omagh St Enda's

- Tyrone Senior Football Championship (2): 2014, 2017

St Mary's University College

- Sigerson Cup (1): 2017 (c)
