= Mattie Donnelly (footballer) =

Tyrone Gaelic footballer

Personal information
- Born: 7 December 1990 (age 35) Trillick, Northern Ireland
- Height: 1.83 m (6 ft 0 in)

Sport
- Sport: Gaelic football
- Position: Right Half Forward
Club
- Years: Club
- Trillick
Inter-county
- Years: County
- 2010–: Tyrone
Inter-county titles
- Ulster titles: 3
- All-Irelands: 1
- All Stars: 2

Mattie Donnelly is an Irish Gaelic footballer who plays for the Trillick club and the Tyrone county team.

In 2015, he was a key part of a Tyrone teamed that reached the All-Ireland SFC semi-final, and was named in the All Stars team.

Donnelly was named in the Ireland squad for the 2014 international rules test in Australia.

Following the retirement of Seán Cavanagh in 2017, Donnelly was appointed Tyrone senior captain. Pádraig Hampsey succeeded Donnelly as captain in May 2021, and it was Hampsey who became the third Tyrone captain to lift the Sam Maguire Cup, following Tyrone's victory over Mayo in the 2021 All-Ireland Senior Football Championship Final.

Sporting positions
Preceded by Seán Cavanagh	Tyrone Senior Football Captain; 2018–2020	Succeeded by Pádraig Hampsey
