= Kerry–Tyrone Gaelic football rivalry =

Irish sports rivalry

Kerry-Tyrone
- Location: County Kerry; County Tyrone
- Teams: Kerry; Tyrone
- First meeting: Kerry 2-15 - 1-10 Tyrone; 1986 All-Ireland final (21 September 1986)
- Latest meeting: Kerry 2-25 - 0-27 Tyrone; 2026 All-Ireland quarter-final (27 June 2026)

Statistics
- Total meetings: 11
- All-time series: Tyrone 4-6 Kerry
- Largest victory: Kerry 2-18 - 0-12 Tyrone; 2023 All Ireland Quarter Final (1 July 2023)

The Kerry-Tyrone rivalry is a Gaelic football rivalry between Irish county teams Kerry and Tyrone, who first played each other in 1986. It is considered to be one of the biggest rivalries in modern Gaelic games. Kerry's home ground is Fitzgerald Stadium and Tyrone's home ground is Healy Park, however, all but one of their championship meetings have been held at neutral venues, usually Croke Park.

While Kerry have the highest number of Munster titles and Tyrone are third on the roll of honour in Ulster, they have also enjoyed success in the All-Ireland Senior Football Championship, having won 42 championship titles between them to date.

== All-time results ==
=== Legend ===
Kerry win
Tyrone win
Match was a draw

=== Senior ===
No.	Date	Winners	Score	Runners-up	Venue	Stage
1.	21 September 1986	Kerry	2-15 - 1-10	Tyrone	Croke Park	All Ireland final
2.	24 August 2003	Tyrone	0-13 - 0-6	Kerry	Croke Park	All Ireland semi-final
3.	25 September 2005	Tyrone	1-16 - 2-10	Kerry	Croke Park	All Ireland final
4.	21 September 2008	Tyrone	1-15 - 0-14	Kerry	Croke Park	All Ireland final
5.	21 July 2012	Kerry	1-16 - 1-6	Tyrone	Fitzgerald Stadium	All Ireland qualifier round 3
6.	23 August 2015	Kerry	0-18 - 1-11	Tyrone	Croke Park	All Ireland semi-final
7.	11 August 2019	Kerry	1-18 - 0-18	Tyrone	Croke Park	All Ireland semi-final
8.	28 August 2021	Tyrone	3-14 - 0-22	Kerry	Croke Park	All Ireland semi-final
7.	1 July 2023	Kerry	2-18 - 0-12	Tyrone	Croke Park	All Ireland quarter-final
8.	12 July 2025	Kerry	1-20 - 0-17	Tyrone	Croke Park	All Ireland semi-final
8.	27 June 2026	Kerry	2-25 - 0-27	Tyrone	Croke Park	All Ireland quarter-final
