= Niall Morgan =

Irish Gaelic footballer

Personal information
- Native name: Niall Ó Muireagáin (Irish)
- Nickname: Primary School Principal
- Born: 17 July 1991 (age 35) Dungannon, Northern Ireland
- Height: 1.84 m (6 ft 0 in)

Sport
- Sport: Gaelic football
- Position: Goalkeeper
Club
- Years: Club
- Edendork St Malachy's
Inter-county
- Years: County
- 2013–: Tyrone
Inter-county titles
- Ulster titles: 3
- All-Irelands: 1
- All Stars: 2
Association football career
- Date of birth: 17 July 1991 (age 35)
- Place of birth: Dungannon, Northern Ireland
- Height: 1.84 m (6 ft 0 in)
- Position: Goalkeeper
Senior career*
Years	Team	Apps	(Gls)
2009–2010	Dungannon Swifts	3	(0)
2011–2013	Dungannon Swifts	62	(0)
2018	Dungannon Swifts	4	(0)
2019	Dungannon Swifts	3	(0)
Total		76	(0)
International career
2009	Northern Ireland Under-18 schoolboys	6	(0)
- * Club domestic league appearances and goals

Niall Morgan (born 17 July 1991) is an Irish Gaelic footballer who plays for the Edendork St Malachy's club and the Tyrone county team.

A knee injury in 2013 ruled him out for the rest of the season. This was considered a severe blow to Tyrone's hopes of winning the All-Ireland Senior Football Championship.

The COVID-19 outbreak in the Tyrone football squad twice delayed the 2021 All-Ireland Senior Football Championship semi-final against Kerry. Morgan later disclosed that he was one of the players who had contracted the virus, though he mistook his symptoms for hayfever.

Morgan has won two All-Star Awards, in 2021 and 2024.

He has also played association football for Dungannon Swifts, and represented Northern Ireland Under-18 schoolboys.
