= 2018 Tyrone Senior Football Championship =

Tyrone SFC
- Season: 2018
- Champions: Coalisland Fianna (10th Title)
- Relegated: Galbally Pearses (16th in S.F.L.); Pomeroy Plunkett's (S.F.L. Relegation Playoff Loser); Aghyaran St. Davog's (S.F.L./I.F.L. Relegation/Promotion Playoff Loser)
- Winning Captain: Stephen McNally
- Man Of The Match: Cormac O’Hagan
- Winning Manager: Damian O’Hagan, Jarlath O’Hagan, Peter Herron

The 2018 Tyrone Senior Football Championship is the 113th edition of Tyrone GAA's premier gaelic football tournament for clubs in Tyrone Senior Football League Division 1. 16 teams compete with the winners receiving the O'Neill Cup and representing Tyrone in the Ulster Senior Club Football Championship.

Omagh St. Enda's were the defending champions after they defeated Errigal Ciarán in the 2017 final. However the defence of their title came undone at the quarter-final stage when losing to eventual finalists Killyclogher St. Mary's.

Moy Tír na nÓg, Derrylaughan Kevin Barry's and Aghyaran St. Davog's returned to senior championship football in 2018.

Galbally Pearses made the drop back down to the Intermediate ranks when finishing bottom of the 2018 S.F.L. They were followed by Pomeroy Plunkett's who lost their S.F.L. Relegation Playoff after a replay to Aghyaran St. Davog's, who in turn then lost their SFL/IFL promotion/relegation playoff also after a replay to Dungannon Thomas Clarke's. I.F.C. champions Tattyreagh St. Patrick's and I.F.L. champions Eglish St. Patrick's will also replace these relegated teams in 2019.

On 21 October 2018, Coalisland Fianna claimed their 10th S.F.C. crown and their first triumph since 2010 when defeating Killyclogher St. Mary's by 2-11 to 1-7 at Healy Park.

The draw for the 2018 S.F.C. was made on 7 June 2018.

== Format ==
The championship has a straight knock out structure. The 16 teams that take part in the championship are the 16 teams in the Senior Football League (SFL).

Relegation from SFC:

Either two or three teams are relegated each year from the SFC and SFL. The 16th placed team in the SFL is automatically relegated to the IFL. The 15th and 14th placed teams then play a SFL relegation playoff with the loser being relegated. The winner plays the winner of the IFL promotion playoffs - if they win, they remain in the SFC and SFL - if they lose they are relegated to the IFC and IFL. (The winner of the SFC can't be relegated. If the championship winner finishes in the bottom 3 in the league, the 13th placed team enters the relegation scenario.)

Promotion to SFC:

Either two or three teams are promoted to the SFC each year. The IFC champions and the IFL champions are automatically promoted to the senior grade (If a team wins the IFC and IFL, the 2nd placed team in the IFL are automatically promoted). 2nd, 3rd, 4th and 5th place in the IFL enter the IFL promotion semi-finals (If the IFC champions are placed in the top 5 the 6th placed team enter the IFL promotion semi-finals) with the eventual winner of the final earning the right to play the loser of the SFL relegation playoff in a relegation/promotion playoff.

== Team changes ==
The following teams have changed division since the 2017 championship season.

=== To S.F.C. ===
Promoted from 2017 Tyrone I.F.C.

- Moy Tír Na nÓg - (IFC Champions)
- Derrylaughan Kevin Barry's - (IFL Champions)
- Aghyaran St. Davog's - (SFL/IFL promotion/relegation playoff Winner)

=== From S.F.C. ===
Relegated to 2018 I.F.C.

- Urney St. Columba's - (SFL/IFL promotion/relegation playoff Loser)
- Strabane Sigersons - (SFL Relegation Loser)
- St Patrick's Greencastle - (16th in SFL)

== Round 1 ==
All 16 teams enter Round 1 in a random open draw. The 8 losers are eliminated from the championship while the 8 winners proceed to the quarter-finals.

- Trillick St. Macartan's 2-11, 1-7 Donaghmore St. Patrick's, 14/9/2018,
- Edendork St. Malachy's 0-10, 0-9 Moy Tir na nÓg, 15/9/2018,
- Galbally Pearse's 3-15, 2-13 Pomeroy Plunkett's, 15/9/2018, (AET)
- Clonoe O'Rahillys 1-11, 2-9 Ardboe O'Donovan Rossa, 16/9/2018,
- Errigal Ciarán 0-16, 0-12 Carrickmore St. Colmcille's, 21/9/2018,
- Omagh St. Enda's 1-11, 1-6 Aghyaran St. Davog's, 22/9/2018, (AET)
- Coalisland Fianna 0-12, 1-8 Dromore St. Dympna's, 23/9/2018,
- Killyclogher St. Mary's 2-8, 0-5 Derrylaughan Kevin Barry's, 23/9/2018,

== Quarter-finals ==
- Edendork St. Malachy's 0-15, 1-10 Galbally Pearse's, 28/9/2018,
- Ardboe O'Donovan Rossa 2-8, 1-10 Trillick St. Macartan's, 29/9/2018,
- Killyclogher St. Mary's 1-12, 0-9 Omagh St. Enda's, 30/9/2018,
- Coalisland Fianna 0-15, 2-7 Errigal Ciarán, 30/9/2018,

== Semi-finals ==
6 October 2018
5:00 pm
Semi-Final

Coalisland Fianna	1-11 - 0-13	Edendork St. Malachy's
	Report

Dungannon
7 October 2018
Semi-Final

Killyclogher St. Mary's	2-9 - 1-9	Ardboe O'Donovan Rossa
	Report

Carrickmore

== Final ==
15 October 2017; 4:00 pm Final	Coalisland Fianna	2-11 - 1-7	Killyclogher St. Mary's	Healy Park, Omagh
