= Tommy Conroy (Mayo Gaelic footballer) =

Irish Gaelic footballer (born 2000)

Personal information
- Born: 2000 (age 25–26) Ireland

Sport
- Sport: Gaelic football
- Position: Full forward
Club
- Years: Club
- The Neale
Club titles
- Mayo titles: Mayo
Inter-county*
Years	County	Apps (scores)
2020 - Present	Mayo	23 (3-36)
Inter-county titles
- All-Irelands: 1
- *Inter County team apps and scores correct as of match played 22 June 2024.

Tommy Conroy is an Irish Gaelic footballer who plays for The Neale and at senior level for the Mayo county team.

== Mayo ==
On 26 July 2026 Conroy won the 2026 All-Ireland Football Championship with Mayo, scoring 0-02, having been brought on as a substitute in the 24th minute. He then scored the winning point for the county in the 69th minute to give Mayo its first All Ireland win in 75 years.

== Career statistics ==
As of match played 22 June 2024

Team	Year	National League			Connacht		All-Ireland		Total	
Team	Year	Division	Apps	Score	Apps	Score	Apps	Score	Apps	Score
Mayo	2020	Division 1			3	1-04	2	0-04	5	1-08
Mayo	2021	Division 2			3	1-07	2	0-05	5	1-12
Mayo	2022	Division 1			************* DNP due to Injury ***********					
Mayo	2023	Division 1			1	0-01	5	1-05	6	1-06
Mayo	2024	Division 1			3	0-04	4	0-06	7	0-10
Career total					10	2-16	13	1-20	23	3-36
