= Ryan O'Donoghue =

Mayo Gaelic footballer

Personal information
- Born: 31 July 1998 (age 28) Ireland

Sport
- Sport: Gaelic football
- Position: Corner forward
Club
- Years: Club
- Belmullet
Inter-county*
Years	County	Apps (scores)
2020–	Mayo	25 (6–108)
Inter-county titles
- Connacht titles: 2
- All-Irelands: 1
- NFL: 1
- All Stars: 1
- *Inter County team apps and scores correct as of match played 6 April 2025.

Ryan O'Donoghue is a Gaelic football player who plays at club level for Belmullet and at senior level for Mayo. He claimed his first All Ireland with Mayo on 26 July 2026.

== Playing career ==
=== Club ===
In 2018, O'Donoghue was on the Belmullet team that won the 2018 Mayo Intermediate Football Championship for the first time in 44 years. He scored 0-3 in the final against Burrishoole, which was won on a score of 2–10 to 0–9.

In 2021, O'Donoghue was on the Belmullet team that reached the final of the Mayo Senior Football Championship for the first time in 40 years. He scored three points in a losing final effort against Knockmore, which finished on a scoreline of 1–9 to 0–6.

=== Inter-county ===
O'Donoghue made his Senior inter-county championship debut in 2020, starting at wing forward as Mayo beat Leitrim by 0–10 to 2–15 in Páirc Seán Mac Diarmada in the quarter-final of the 2020 Connacht Senior Football Championship. He again started at wing forward in the semi-final win against Roscommon. He got his first championship score in the Connacht final, scoring a point as Mayo won against Galway on a scoreline of 0–14 to 0–13.

On 26 July 2026 O'Donoghue won the 2026 All-Ireland Football Championship with Mayo, scoring 0-05. He was named All-Ireland final man of the match and The Sunday Game 2026 Player of the Season. He was selected at 14 in The Sunday Game 2026 Team of the Year.

== Career statistics ==
As of match played 6 April 2025

Team	Year	National League			Connacht		All-Ireland		Total	
Team	Year	Division	Apps	Score	Apps	Score	Apps	Score	Apps	Score
Mayo	2020	Division 1	7	0–5	3	0–1	2	0–2	12	0–8
Mayo	2021	Division 2	4	1–4	3	2–14	2	0–13	9	3–31
Mayo	2022	Division 1	8	2–37	1	0–4	-		9	2–41
Mayo	2023	Division 1	8	2–30	1	0–2	5	0–20	14	2–52
Mayo	2024	Division 1	7	0–25	3	1–26	7	3–48	15	3–121
Mayo	2025	Division 1			1	1-04			1	1-04
Career total			34	5–101	12	4–51	13	2–57	59	11–209

== Honours ==
Mayo

- Connacht Senior Football Championship: (2) 2020, 2021
- All Ireland Senior Football Championship: (1) 2026
- National Football League: (1) 2023
- FBD League: (1) 2023

Individual

- All Stars Awards: (1) 2021
