= 2015 All-Ireland Under-21 Football Championship =

Gaelic football competition

Championship details
- Dates: 25 February – 2 May 2015
- Teams: 31

All-Ireland Champions
- Winning team: Tyrone (5th win)
- Captain: Kieran McGeary
- Manager: Feargal Logan

All-Ireland Finalists
- Losing team: Tipperary
- Captain: Colin O'Riordan
- Manager: Tommy Toomey

Provincial Champions
- Munster: Tipperary
- Leinster: Dublin
- Ulster: Tyrone
- Connacht: Roscommon

Championship statistics
- Player of the Year: Colin O'Riordan

The 2015 All-Ireland Under 21 Football Championship was an inter county football competition between all 32 counties in Ireland. Four competitions were contested in each of the provinces and the winners of each provincial championship entered the all-Ireland series. The competition was sponsored for the first time by EirGrid.

Tyrone defeated Tipperary in the final on a 1-11 to 0-13 scoreline.

== 2015 Leinster Under-21 Football Championship ==
=== Preliminary round ===
- Laois 4-12 Wexford 1-11 (25 February)
- Louth 3-11 Carlow 2-10 (25 February)
- Longford 4-13 Wicklow 1-05 (25 February)

=== Quarter-finals ===
- Meath 1-10 Westmeath 1-08 (4 March)
- Longford 1-17 Louth 1-04 (4 March)
- Dublin 2-21 Laois 2-10 (4 March)
- Kildare 3-12 Offaly 0-09 (5 March)

=== Semi-finals ===
| 18 March 2015; 7:00 pm Semi-final | Dublin | 2-15 - 3-7 | Longford | Páirc Tailteann; Referee: John Hickey (Carlow) |
| 18 March 2015; 7:00 pm Semi-final | Killian O’Gara 1-2, Conor McHugh 0-5 (0-1f), Colm Basquel 1-1, Niall Scully 0-3, Eric Lowndes 0-2, Andy Foley and Aaron Byrne 0-1 each | Report | Liam Connerton 2-1, Larry Moran 1-1 (0-1f), Patrick Kiernan 0-2, Andrew Dalton, David McGivney (0-1f) and Dessie Reynolds 0-1 each | Páirc Tailteann; Referee: John Hickey (Carlow) |

| 18 March 2015; 7:00 pm Semi-final | Kildare | 2-15 - 0-13 | Meath | O'Moore Park; Referee: Fergal Smyth (Offaly) |
| 18 March 2015; 7:00 pm Semi-final | Neil Flynn 1-6 (0-4f), Niall Kelly 0-4, Cein McMonagle 1-0, Chris Healy and Chris Fenner 0-2 each, David Fitzpatrick 0-1 | Report | Ruairí Ó Coileáin 0-8 (6f), Eamon Wallace 0-3, Padraic Harnan and Paddy Kennelly 0-1 each | O'Moore Park; Referee: Fergal Smyth (Offaly) |

=== Final ===
| 2 April; Final | Dublin | 3-10 - 1-12 | Kildare | Páirc Tailteann; Referee: Niall Ward (Westmeath); Man of the Match: Neil Flynn |
| 2 April; Final | Cormac Costello 2-2 (0-1f), Conor McHugh 0-5 (0-1 pen), Colm Basquel 1-0, Shane Carthy, Andrew Foley, Eric Lowndes 0-1 each. | Report | Neil Flynn 0-11 (0-6f, 2'45), Mark Sherry 1-0, Niall Kelly 0-1. | Páirc Tailteann; Referee: Niall Ward (Westmeath); Man of the Match: Neil Flynn |

== 2015 Munster Under-21 Football Championship ==
=== Quarter-finals ===
- Cork 5-18 Limerick 2-12 (11 March)
- Clare 2-11 Waterford 0-3 (11 March)

=== Semi-finals ===
| 18 March 2015; 7:00 pm Semi-final | Cork | 1-12 - 1-9 | Kerry | Páirc Uí Rinn; Referee: Derek O’Mahoney (Tipperary) |
| 18 March 2015; 7:00 pm Semi-final | Cathal Vaughan 0-4 (0-3f), Seán O’Donoghue 1-1 (0-1f), Peter Kelleher, Seán White, Conor Horgan 0-2 each, Brian O’Driscoll 0-1 | Report | Conor Keane 1-7 (0-6f), Brian Crowley and Jack Savage (0-1f) 0-1 each | Páirc Uí Rinn; Referee: Derek O’Mahoney (Tipperary) |

| 18 March 2015; 7:00 pm Semi-final | Tipperary | 0-15 - 0-7 | Clare | Semple Stadium; Referee: James Bermingham (Cork) |
| 18 March 2015; 7:00 pm Semi-final | Jason Lonergan 0-5, Liam Casey and Steven O’Brien 0-2 each, Colin O’Riordan, Bill Maher, Ian Fahey, Paul Maher, John McGrath and Josh Keane (0-1f) 0-1 each | Report | Keelan Sexton 0-4f, Jamie Malone 0-2, Paddy O’Malley 0-1f | Semple Stadium; Referee: James Bermingham (Cork) |

=== Final ===
| 9 April; Final | Tipperary | 1-15 - 3-8 | Cork | Semple Stadium; Attendance: 2,137; Referee: Sean Joy (Kerry); Man of the Match: Ian Fahey |
| 9 April; Final | Kevin O’Halloran 0-6 (0-5f), Ian Fahey 1-0, Jason Lonergan, Paul Maher, Josh Keane (0-1f), Colin O’Riordan 0-2 each, Steven O’Brien 0-1 | Report | Peter Kelleher 2-0, Cian Dorgan 1-1, Cathal Vaughan 0-4 (2f), Brian O’Driscoll (f), Sean O’Donoghue & Darragh Murphy 0-1 each. | Semple Stadium; Attendance: 2,137; Referee: Sean Joy (Kerry); Man of the Match: Ian Fahey |

== 2015 Connacht Under-21 Football Championship ==
| Quarter-finals | | Semi-finals | | Connacht Final |
| | | Roscommon | 6-18 |
| | | Sligo | 0-12 |
| | | | | Roscommon | 3-14 |
| Mayo | 4-07 | | | Galway | 3-11 |
| Leitrim | 0-08 | Galway | 2-8 |
| | | Mayo | 0-11 |

=== Quarter-final ===
- Mayo 4-7 Leitrim 0-8 (11 March)

=== Semi-finals ===
- Roscommon 6-18 Sligo 0-12 (18 March)
- Mayo 0-11 Galway 1-12 (21 March)

=== Final ===
| 4 April; Final | Roscommon | 3-14 - 3-11 | Galway | St Jarlath's Park, Tuam; Attendance: 4,796; Referee: Jerome Henry (Mayo) |
| 4 April; Final | Diarmuid Murtagh 1-7 (0-6f), Cathal Compton and Paul Kenny 1-0 each, Ultan Harney 0-3, Shane Killoran 0-2, Jack Earley and Kieran Kilcline 0-1 each | Report | Eamon Brannigan 1-3, Damien Comer 1-2 (0-1f), Enda Tierney 1-1, Colin Brady 0-3, Kieran Molloy, Johnny Heaney 0-1 each | St Jarlath's Park, Tuam; Attendance: 4,796; Referee: Jerome Henry (Mayo) |

== 2015 Ulster Under-21 Football Championship ==
=== Preliminary round ===
- Derry 2-12 Down 1-11 (11 March)

=== Quarter-finals ===
- Tyrone 0-17 Fermanagh 0-7 (18 March)
- Donegal 1-7 Cavan 0-9 (18 March)
- Monaghan 0-15 Derry 1-8 (18 March)
- Armagh 2-13 Antrim 1-5 (22 March)

=== Semi-finals ===
- Donegal 4-9 Monaghan 1-5 (1 April)
- Tyrone 2-12 Armagh 2-8 (1 April)

=== Final ===
| 8 April; Final | Tyrone | 1-11 - 0-13 | Donegal | Celtic Park; Attendance: 3,239; Referee: Noel Mooney (Cavan) |
| 8 April; Final | Lee Brennan 0-4 (0-2f), Daniel McNulty 0-4 (0-3f), Conor Meyler 1-0, Cathal McShane, Michael Cassidy, Ruairi McGlone 0-1 each | Report | Hugh McFadden 0-5 (0-4f), Eoin McHugh and Darach O'Connor 0-2 each, Ciarán Thompson (0-1f), Willie Gillespie, Eamon McGrath, Stephen McBrearty 0-1 each | Celtic Park; Attendance: 3,239; Referee: Noel Mooney (Cavan) |

== All-Ireland ==
=== Semi-finals ===
| 18 April; 16:00; Semi-final | Dublin | 0-12 - 0-14 | Tipperary | O'Connor Park, Tullamore; Referee: J Henry (Mayo) |
| 18 April; 16:00; Semi-final | C McHugh (1f), C Costello (3f) 0-4 each, S Carthy 0-2, D Campbell, C Basquel 0-1. | Report | K O'Halloran 0-4 (3f), J Keane 0-3 (3f), S O'Brien, C O'Riordan 0-2 each, R Mulcahy, J Lonergan, L Casey 0-1 each. | O'Connor Park, Tullamore; Referee: J Henry (Mayo) |

| 18 April; 18:00; Semi-final | Roscommon | 0-12 - 0-17 | Tyrone | Markievicz Park; Referee: P O’Sullivan (Kerry) |
| 18 April; 18:00; Semi-final | Diarmuid Murtagh 0-6 (4f), Cathal Compton 0-3, Ronan Daly (1f), Thomas Corcoran, Jack Earley 0-1 each. | Report | Lee Brennan 0-6 (1f), Daniel McNulty 0-4 (3f), Cathal McShane 0-3, Mark Kavanagh 0-2, Michael Cassidy, Francis Burns 0-1 each. | Markievicz Park; Referee: P O’Sullivan (Kerry) |

=== Final ===
| 2 May; 18:00; Final | Tipperary | 0-13 - 1-11 | Tyrone | Parnell Park; Referee: Fergal Kelly (Longford) |
| 2 May; 18:00; Final | K O'Halloran 0-6 (5f), J Keane 0-3 (1f), C O’Riordan 0-2 (1f), B Maher, I Fahey 0-1 each. | Report | C McShane 1-0, D McNulty 0-3 (2f), M Kavanagh, M Bradley, L Brennan (2f) 0-2 each, C Meyler, M Cassidy 0-1 each. | Parnell Park; Referee: Fergal Kelly (Longford) |
