= Niall Sludden =

Irish Gaelic footballer

Personal information
- Born: Dromore, Northern Ireland
- Occupation: Teacher

Sport
- Sport: Gaelic football
- Position: Centre forward
Club
- Years: Club
- Dromore St Dympna's
Inter-county
- Years: County
- 2016–2023: Tyrone
Inter-county titles
- Ulster titles: 2
- All-Irelands: 1

Niall Sludden is an Irish Gaelic footballer who plays for the Dromore St Dympna's club and the Tyrone county team.

On 25 October 2017, Sludden was named in the Ireland squad for the 2017 International Rules Series against Australia in November.

Sludden was in the All-Ireland Senior Football Championship final team of 2018 when Tyrone faced Dublin at Croke Park (Tyrone lost). He scored a crucial goal in the semi-final against Monaghan to win that game.
