= Peter Harte =

Irish Gaelic footballer (born 1990)

Personal information
- Native name: Peadar Ó hAirt (Irish)
- Born: 19 November 1990 (age 35) Ballygawley, Northern Ireland
- Occupation: Teacher
- Height: 1.81 m (5 ft 11 in)

Sport
- Sport: Gaelic football
- Position: Centre forward
Club
- Years: Club
- Errigal Ciarán
Inter-county
- Years: County
- 2010–: Tyrone
Inter-county titles
- Ulster titles: 4
- All-Irelands: 1
- All Stars: 2

Peter Harte is an Irish Gaelic footballer who plays for the Errigal Ciarán club and the Tyrone county team.

He has played for Ireland in the 2015 International Rules Series and won an All Star Awards in 2016 and 2021.

He is the nephew of the Derry and ex-Tyrone football manager Mickey Harte and is married to Áine Canavan, daughter of Peter Canavan and Tyrone Ladies' footballer.
