= Matthew Ruane =

Mayo Gaelic footballer

Personal information
- Native name: Maitiú Ó Ruáin (Irish)
- Born: 29 October 1996 (age 30) Castlebar, Ireland
- Occupation: Supply Chain Analyst
- Height: 1.93 m (6 ft 4 in)

Sport
- Sport: Gaelic football
- Position: Midfield
Club
- Years: Club
- 2014–: Breaffy
College(s)
- Years: College
- 2015–2019 2019–2020: DCU; NUI Galway
Inter-county
- Years: County
- 2019–: Mayo
Inter-county titles
- Connacht titles: 2
- All-Irelands: 1
- NFL: 2
- All Stars: 1

Matthew Ruane is a Gaelic football player who plays at club level for Breaffy and at senior level for Mayo.

In 2021 Matthew won an All Star for Mayo.

On 26 July 2026, Ruane won the 2026 All-Ireland Football Championship with Mayo, having been brought on as a substitute in the 53rd minute.
