= Darren McCurry =

Irish Gaelic footballer

Personal information
- Occupation: Plumber

Sport
- Sport: Gaelic football
- Position: Corner Forward
Club
- Years: Club
- Edendork St Malachy's
Inter-county*
Years	County	Apps (scores)
2012–	Tyrone	67 (5-227)
Inter-county titles
- Ulster titles: 3
- All-Irelands: 1
- *Inter County team apps and scores correct as of 21:28, 7 November 2025.

Darren McCurry is an Irish Gaelic Footballer and plays for Edendork and Tyrone.

== Career statistics ==
As of match played 22 June 2024

Team	Year	National League			Ulster		All-Ireland		Total	
Team	Year	Division	Apps	Score	Apps	Score	Apps	Score	Apps	Score
Tyrone	2012	Division 2			-		2	0-05	2	0-05
Tyrone	2013	Division 1			-		6	0-28	6	0-28
Tyrone	2014	Division 1			3	1-08	2	0-08	5	1-16
Tyrone	2015	Division 1			1	1-00	6	0-24	7	1-24
Tyrone	2016	Division 2			4	0-06	1	0-01	5	0-07
Tyrone	2017	Division 1			3	0-03	2	0-01	5	0-04
Tyrone	2018	Division 1			-		-		-	
Tyrone	2019	Division 1			3	1-04	7	1-08	10	2-13
Tyrone	2020	Division 1			1	0-03	-		1	0-03
Tyrone	2021	Division 1			3	0-22	2	1-08	5	1-30
Tyrone	2022	Division 1			2	0-10	1	0-07	3	0-17
Tyrone	2023	Division 1			1	0-05	4	0-21	5	0-26
Tyrone	2024	Division 1			2	0-06	4	0-12	6	0-18
Career total					23	3-67	37	2-123	60	5-190
