= 2021 Ulster Senior Football Championship =

Association football tournament

2021 Ulster SFC
Tournament details
- Year: 2021
- Trophy: Anglo-Celt Cup

Winners
- Champions: Tyrone (16th win)
- Manager: Feargal Logan; Brian Dooher
- Captain: Pádraig Hampsey

Runners-up
- Runners-up: Monaghan
- Manager: Séamus McEnaney
- Captain: Ryan Wylie

Other
- Top Scorer: Darren McCurry (0-22)

The 2021 Ulster Senior Football Championship is the 133rd installment of the annual Ulster Senior Football Championship organised by Ulster GAA. It is one of the four provincial competitions of the 2021 All-Ireland Senior Football Championship. The winning team received the Anglo-Celt Cup. The draw for the championship was made on 22 April 2021.

== Teams ==
The Ulster championship is contested by the nine county teams in the province of Ulster.

| Team | Colours | Sponsor | Manager | Captain | Most recent success |
| Team | Colours | Sponsor | Manager | Captain | All-Ireland | Provincial |
|---|---|---|---|---|---|---|
| Antrim | Saffron and white | Fona Cab | Enda McGinley | Peter Healy | | 1951 |
| Armagh | Orange and white | Simply Fruit | Kieran McGeeney | Rory Grugan | 2002 | 2008 |
| Cavan | Royal blue and white | Kingspan Group | Mickey Graham | Raymond Galligan | 1952 | 2020 |
| Derry | Red and white | H&A Mechanical Services | Rory Gallagher | Chrissy McKaigue | 1993 | 1998 |
| Donegal | Gold and green | KN Group | Declan Bonner | Michael Murphy | 2012 | 2019 |
| Down | Red and black | EOS IT Solutions | Paddy Tally | Darren O'Hagan | 1994 | 1994 |
| Fermanagh | Green and white | Tracey Concrete | Ryan McMenamin | Eoin Donnelly |
| Monaghan | White and blue | Investec | Séamus "Banty" McEnaney | Ryan Wylie | | 2015 |
| Tyrone | White and Red | Tyrone Fabrication | Feargal Logan; Brian Dooher | Pádraig Hampsey | 2008 | 2017 |

== Championship draw ==
Preliminary round
Down | 1-12
Donegal | 2-25

Quarter-finals
Armagh | 4-15
Antrim | 0-14
Monaghan | 1-21
Fermanagh | 0-14
Tyrone | 1-18
Cavan | 0-13
Derry | 0-15
Donegal | 0-16

Semi-finals
Armagh | 2-21
Monaghan | 4-17
Tyrone | 0-23
Donegal | 1-14

Final
Monaghan | 0-15
Tyrone | 0-16

== Preliminary round ==
Two counties were randomly drawn to face each other in the preliminary round. The lowest ranked county to play in the preliminary round was Down of Division 2.

| 27 June 2021; 13:00; Preliminary Round | Donegal (1) | 2-25 - 1-12 | Down (2) | Pairc Esler, Newry; Referee: Maurice Deegan (Laois) |
| 27 June 2021; 13:00; Preliminary Round | Paddy McBrearty 1-6 (0-2f), Jamie Brennan 1-1, Ryan McHugh and Michael Langan (0-1f, 1 '45) 0-4 each, Peadar Mogan 0-3, Michael Murphy 0-2 (0-1f), Ciarán Thompson, Niall O'Donnell, Eoin McHugh, Ethan O'Donnell, Conor O'Donnell 0-1 each | Report | Barry O'Hagan 0-8 (0-3f, 0-1m), Caolan Mooney 1-0, Liam Kerr 0-2 (0-1f), Darren O'Hagan and James Guinness 0-1 each | Pairc Esler, Newry; Referee: Maurice Deegan (Laois) |

== Quarter-finals ==
Seven counties were given a bye to this stage and were joined by the winning team from the preliminary round. The lowest ranked county to play in the semi-finals was Antrim of Division 4.

| 3 July 2021; 15:30; Quarter-final | Monaghan (1) | 1-21 - 0-14 | Fermanagh (3) | Athletic Grounds, Armagh |
| 3 July 2021; 15:30; Quarter-final | Jack McCarron (1-2, 0-2f), Conor McManus (0-4, 0-2f, 1m), Aaron Mulligan (0-3), Micheál Bannigan (0-2), Colin Walshe (0-2, 1m), Conor Boyle, Ryan Wylie, Karl O'Connell, Dessie Ward, Killian Lavelle, Niall Kearns (0-1 each), Rory Beggan (0-1 1'45'), Conor McCarthy (0-1, 1m) | Report | Seán Quigley (0-7, 5f, 1'45'), Aidan Breen (0-2), Jonny Cassidy, Ciaran Corrigan, Ultan Kelm, Dara McGurn, Josh Largo-Ellis (0-1 each) | Athletic Grounds, Armagh |

| 4 July 2021; 15:30; Quarter-final | Armagh (1) | 4-15 - 0-14 | Antrim (4) | St Tiernach's Park, Clones; Attendance: 0 (Note: The game was played behind closed doors due to the COVID-19 pandemic in the Republic of Ireland) |
| 4 July 2021; 15:30; Quarter-final | Rian O'Neill (1-5 1-0 pen, 5f), Rory Grugan (1-2), Conor Turbitt (1-1), Tiernan Kelly (1-0), Jarlath Óg Burns (0-2), Connaire Mackin, Greg McCabe, Ciaron O'Hanlon, Oisin O'Neill (0-1 each), Patrick Burns (0-1, mark) | Report | Ryan Murray (0-3, 2f), Ruairí McCann (0-2f), Dermot McAleese (0-2), Paddy McBride (0-2), Conor Murray (0-2, 1f), Niall McKeever, Conor Small (0-1 each), Odhran Eastwood (0-1 mark) | St Tiernach's Park, Clones; Attendance: 0 |

| 10 July 2021; 16:30; Quarter-final | Tyrone (1) | 1-18 - 0-13 | Cavan (3) | Healy Park, Omagh |
| 10 July 2021; 16:30; Quarter-final | Darren McCurry 0-10 (3f, 1m), Brian Kennedy 1-0, Cathal McShane 0-3 (1f), Niall Sludden 0-2, Peter Harte 0-1, Richard Donnelly 0-1, Paul Donaghy 0-1 | Report | Gearóid McKiernan 0-6 (4f), Conor Smith 0-2, Raymond Galligan 0-1f, Thomas Galligan 0-1, Gerard Smith 0-1, Oisin Pierson 0-1, Conor Madden 0-1 | Healy Park, Omagh |

| 11 July 2021; 16:00; Quarter-final | Donegal (1) | 0-16 - 0-15 | Derry (3) | MacCumhaill Park, Ballybofey; Attendance: 0 |
| 11 July 2021; 16:00; Quarter-final | Paddy McBrearty (0-2f), Michael Langan and Niall O'Donnell 0-3 each, Caolan McGonagle, Jamie Brennan and Michael Murphy (0-2f) 0-2 each, Paul Brennan 0-1. | Report | Shane McGuigan 0-4 (0-2f), Ciaran McFaul 0-3, Benny Heron 0-2, Padraig Cassidy, Gareth McKinless, Conor Doherty, Conor Glass, Emmett Bradley and Niall Loughlin 0-1 each. | MacCumhaill Park, Ballybofey; Attendance: 0 |

== Semi-finals ==
The four quarter-finals winners advance to this stage. All four counties in the semi-finals were from Division 1.

| 17 July 2021; 16:00 IST (UTC+1); Semi-final | Armagh (1) | 2-21 - 4-17 | Monaghan (1) | Pairc Esler, Newry |
| 17 July 2021; 16:00 IST (UTC+1); Semi-final | Rian O'Neill (0-6, 3frees), Conor Turbitt (1-1), Oisin O'Neill (0-3), Rory Grugan (0-3, 1free), Tiernan Kelly (1-0), Connaire O'Hanlon, Greg McCabe, Niall Grimley, Jarlath Óg Burns, Andrew Murnin, Stefan Campbell, C O'Neill, Ross McQuillan (0-1 each) | Report | Conor McManus (1-6, 0-3 frees, 0-1 mark), Jack McCarron, Micheál Bannigan (1-1 each), Darren Hughes (1-0), Rory Beggan (0-2 frees), Dessie Ward, Stephen O'Hanlon (0-2 each), Conor McCarthy, Shane Carey (0-1 each) | Pairc Esler, Newry |

| 18 July 2021; 13:45 IST (UTC+1); Semi-final | Tyrone (1) | 0-23 - 1-14 | Donegal (1) | Brewster Park, Enniskillen |
| 18 July 2021; 13:45 IST (UTC+1); Semi-final | Darren McCurry (0-7, 3 frees), Kieran McGeary, Niall Sludden, Tiernan McCann (0-3 each), Mattie Donnelly (0-2), Peter Harte, Conor Meyler, Conor McKenna, Frank Burns (0-1 each), Cathal McShane (0-1 free) | Report | Paddy McBrearty (0-4, 2 frees), Caolan McGonigle (1-0), Jamie Brennan, Niall O'Donnell (0-2 each), Michael Langan (0-2, 1 free), Michael Murphy (0-2 frees), Ciarán Thompson, Peader Mogan (0-1 each) | Brewster Park, Enniskillen |

== Final ==
| 31 July 2021; 16:00; Final | Monaghan | 0-15 - 0-16 | Tyrone | Croke Park, Dublin; Attendance: 18,000 |
| 31 July 2021; 16:00; Final | Conor McManus 0-4 (0-3f), Jack McCarron (0-1m) and Rory Beggan (0-2f) 0-2 each, Conor Boyle, Kieran Duffy, Killian Lavelle, Michael Bannigan, Conor McCarthy and Colin Walshe (0-1m) 0-1 each. | Report | Darren McCurry 0-5 (0-2f, 0-1m), Mattie Donnelly 0-3 (0-1f), Mark Bradley 0-2, Padraig Hampsey, Michael McKiernan, Niall Sludden, Peter Harte, Kieran McGeary and Cathal McShane 0-1 each. | Croke Park, Dublin; Attendance: 18,000 |

Tyrone advanced to the 2020 All-Ireland SFC semi-finals.

== See also ==
- 2021 All-Ireland Senior Football Championship
  - 2021 Connacht Senior Football Championship
  - 2021 Leinster Senior Football Championship
  - 2021 Munster Senior Football Championship
