= Tyrone county football team =

Gaelic football team

Tyrone
- Sport: Football
- Irish: Tír Eoghain
- Nickname(s): The O'Neill men The Red Hands
- County board: Tyrone GAA
- Manager: Malachy O'Rourke
- Captain: Brian Kennedy
- Home venue(s): Healy Park, Omagh

Recent competitive record
- Current All-Ireland status: QF in 2026
- Last championship title: 2021
- Current NFL Division: 2 (5th in 2026)
- Last league title: 2003
First colours	Second colours

The Tyrone county football team (/tɪˈroʊn/) represents Tyrone GAA, the county board of the Gaelic Athletic Association, in the Gaelic sport of football. The team competes in the three major annual inter-county competitions; the All-Ireland Senior Football Championship, the Ulster Senior Football Championship and the National Football League.

Tyrone's home ground is Healy Park, Omagh. The current team manager is Malachy O'Rourke. Their longest-standing and fiercest rivalry is with Armagh, one of their geographic neighbors in Ulster. The team last won the Ulster Senior Championship in 2021, the All-Ireland Senior Championship in 2021 and the National League in 2003.

== History ==
=== Pre-Harte era: 1956–2002 ===
Tyrone won its first Ulster Senior Football Championship (SFC) in 1956, defending it successfully in 1957. The county did not win a third Ulster SFC title until 1973. The Tyrone minor team, however, won the All-Ireland Minor Football Championship (MFC) in 1947, 1948 and 1973. 1973 is remembered because Frank McGuigan, who captained the minor team, was also part of the under-21 and senior teams which won their respective Ulster Championships.

The Tyrone team of the mid-eighties included McGuigan, Eugene McKenna, Plunkett Donaghy and John Lynch, winning a fourth Ulster SFC title in 1984, and in 1986, reaching a first ever final of the All-Ireland Senior Football Championship (SFC), where Kerry defeated it by a scoreline of 2–15 to 1–10. Tyrone added a sixth Ulster SFC (after a replay of the final) in 1989.

However, All-Ireland SFC success eluded Tyrone and the county watched as its Ulster rivals won an unprecedented four consecutive national titles in the early 1990s (two titles for Down bookending one title for Donegal, as well as Derry's only title).

Tyrone would reach the 1994 Ulster SFC final to lose to eventual All-Ireland winners Down; however, Tyrone's forward Peter Canavan was Ulster's top scorer, winning his first All Star Award. The following year Tyrone had its turn at being Ulster champions and, in keeping with the recent form of the winners of that competition, reached the 1995 All-Ireland Senior Football Championship Final (only the county's second ever). Dublin emerged as victors by a scoreline of 1–10 to 0–12, in a match that was notable both for Canavan scoring 11 of Tyrone's 12 points, and for Dublin's Charlie Redmond failing to leave the pitch for a full minute after being sent off for a foul. In 1996, Tyrone again met Down in the Ulster SFC final, this time emerging as the winner. However, the county fell at the 1996 All-Ireland SFC semi-final stage to a Meath team "who bullied them in a way that left the losers with a reputation for softness", according to one commentator.

In 1998, the county won the All-Ireland MFC final for the first time in fifteen years, with a team that included future senior team players Cormac McAnallen, Stephen O'Neill and Ryan McMenamin. McAnallen also captained the county's under-21 team to successive All-Ireland Under-21 Football Championship titles in 2000 and 2001.

However, having won an Ulster SFC, Tyrone and its young team "folded in the face of a rugged Derry challenge" in the 2001 All-Ireland SFC quarter-final. Further decline followed with a season in which Sligo "ran Tyrone ragged" during an All-Ireland SFC qualifier.

=== Harte era: 2002–2020 ===
2003 brought the introduction of a new Tyrone manager, Mickey Harte. Harte's team eventually overcame Down in the Ulster SFC final, requiring a replay, when Harte switched McAnallen from midfield to full-back. Tyrone won against Fermanagh in the All-Ireland SFC quarter-final, before overcoming Kerry in the semi-final by a scoreline of 0–13 to 0–6. Canavan limped off injured early in that game and television expert Pat Spillane deemed Tyrone's approach during the second half of the semi-final to be "puke football". The 2003 All-Ireland SFC final was Tyrone's third and had the county pitted against rival and neighbouring county Armagh, the reigning All-Ireland SFC champions (Armagh had also beaten Tyrone to the title). It was the first All-Ireland SFC final between sides from the same province. Canavan was still injured but Harte decided to have him feature from the start; Canavan scored five points from frees before being substituted at half-time, later to re-emerge onto the pitch in the closing moments as Tyrone held a narrow lead. Tyrone won by a scoreline of 0–12 to 0–9 and lifted the Sam Maguire Cup for the first time. 2003 also saw Tyrone win the National Football League for a second successive year.

Tragedy struck the following year with the sudden death of Cormac McAnallen, at the age of 24.

Tyrone, however, came back the following year to win the All-Ireland SFC for a second time. The county played a total of ten matches, including three replays, which was a record for any winning team. Tyrone played five matches in the Ulster SFC, including replays against Cavan in the semi-final and against Armagh in the final, which they lost. That replay was later described by one commentator as "perhaps the most mean-spirited match played since Dublin–Galway's 1983 All-Ireland final meeting and seemed to confirm the widespread idea that the game was tending towards a zero point of cynicism and negativity". Having to contest an All-Ireland SFC qualifier as a result of that loss, Tyrone overcame Monaghan to reach an All-Ireland SFC quarter-final against Dublin. Tyrone had yet another drawn game, a match notable for Owen Mulligan's stunning solo goal. Manager Harte combined Enda McGinley with Joe McMahon for the second half, a move which outwitted Ciarán Whelan, who had been getting the better of his opponents in the first half; Whelan was ultimately removed from the game by Dublin. In the All-Ireland SFC semi-final, the county met Armagh for a third time; two points behind with only six minutes of play left, Seán Cavanagh scored a solo point, substitute Shane Sweeney levelled the game and Peter Canavan converted an injury-time free. Tyrone won by a scoreline of 1–13 to 1–12. In the 2005 All-Ireland SFC final, the county defeated Kerry for the second time in three years to win the Sam Maguire Cup, sparking emotional scenes among the Tyrone team and fans, in remembrance of Cormac McAnallen.

Tyrone won its eleventh Ulster SFC title in 2007, but lost to Meath in the All-Ireland SFC quarter-final.

The county lost its opening game of the 2008 Ulster SFC, a quarter-final to Down. Entering the All-Ireland SFC qualifiers again, the county's progress went largely unnoticed until it reached the All-Ireland SFC quarter-final, where Tyrone hammered Dublin by 12 points. The team advanced to the All-Ireland SFC semi-final against Wexford but did not impress against the Strawberries, appearing in at that stage for the first time since 1945. Tyrone did enough though, but entered 2008 All-Ireland SFC final against a Kerry team then bidding to win three consecutive titles. Kerry did not. Despite Peter Canavan's retirement, Mulligan's disciplinary problems and O'Neill's on-off retirement through injury, Tyrone prevailed to win a third All-Ireland SFC title. Tyrone defeated Kerry by a scoreline of 1–15 to 0–14. Justin McMahon dealt with Kerry's new weapon, Kieran Donaghy, while the half-back line of David Harte, Conor Gormley and Philip Jordan outperformed expectations from outside the county and Cavanagh scored five points from play.

Tyrone reached All-Ireland SFC semi-finals in 2009, 2013, 2015, 2017 and 2019, only for Cork, Mayo, Kerry, Dublin and Kerry (again) to beat it respectively. A shock All-Ireland SFC quarter-final loss to Dublin occurred in 2010.

Tyrone won its fifteenth Ulster SFC in 2017. But that year's All-Ireland SFC semi-final defeat was by a margin of 12 points. It reached the 2018 All-Ireland Senior Football Championship Final but Dublin defeated it again.

Harte's final championship game ended in defeat to Donegal in the 2020 Ulster SFC quarter-final and, with no All-Ireland SFC qualifiers due to the impact of the COVID-19 pandemic on Gaelic games, Tyrone's championship ended after one game.

=== Dooher and Logan era: 2020–2024 ===
Harte departed as manager in November 2020. A short while later, Feargal Logan and Brian Dooher succeeded him. Logan had been tipped to take sole charge but Dooher joined him. Both were previously in charge of the county's under-21 team in 2015. Peter Canavan had also been involved with the 2015 under-21 team but had earlier ruled himself out due to family involvement.

Like Harte's appointment, the Dooher and Logan managerial ticket was immediately successful, with the team winning an unexpected 2021 All-Ireland SFC in its first year. Dooher became the fifth manager to win an All-Ireland SFC after earlier captaining his county to victory in the same competition (and the first since Páidí Ó Sé in 1997). Conor McKenna became the fourth former AFL player to win the Sam Maguire Cup.

== Support ==
Tyrone has its own supporters' club, called Club Tyrone, which was established in 1995. Unlike supporters' clubs in other counties, it is a sub-committee of the county board and focuses on fundraising. By 2016, it had raised several million pounds and received regular sums of £500 from close to 500 individual supporters each year.

== Panel ==
Team as per Tyrone vs Kerry in the 2025 All-Ireland Senior Football Championship Semi-Final, 12th July 2025

No.	Player	Position	Club
1	Niall Morgan	Goalkeeper	Edendork
2	Cormac Quinn	Right corner-back	Errigal Ciarán
3	Pádraig Hampsey	Full back	Coalisland
4	Niall Devlin	Left corner-back	Coalisland
5	Peter Teague	Right half-back	Dromore St Dympna's
6	Rory Brennan	Centre back	Trillick
7	Kieran McGeary	Left half-back	Pomeroy
8	Brian Kennedy	Midfield	Derrylaughan
9	Conn Kilpatrick	Midfield	Edendork
10	Seánie O'Donnell	Right half-forward	Trillick
11	Peter Harte (c)	Centre forward	Errigal Ciarán
12	Ciarán Daly	Left half-forward	Trillick
13	Darren McCurry	Right corner-forward	Edendork
14	Mattie Donnelly	Full forward	Trillick
15	Darragh Canavan	Left corner-forward	Errigal Ciarán

No.	Player	Position	Club
16	Oisín O'Kane	Goalkeeper	Loughmacrory
17	Aidan Clarke	Corner back	Omagh St Enda's
18	Michael Rafferty	Corner back	Killyclogher
19	Frank Burns	Wing forward	Pomeroy
20	Michael McKernan	Centre back	Coalisland
21	Ben McDonnell	Midfield	Errigal Ciarán
22	Michael O'Neill	Centre forward	Ardboe
23	Conor Meyler	Wing forward	Omagh St Enda's
24	Eoin McElholm	Corner forward	Loughmacrory
25	Mark Bradley	Centre forward	Killyclogher St Mary's
26	Ruairí Canavan	Corner forward	Errigal Ciarán

== Management team ==
Appointed on a three-year term in September 2024:

Position	Staff
Manager	Malachy O'Rourke
Assistant Manager	Ryan Porter
Coach	Leo McBride
Coach	Colm McCullagh
Coach	Chris Lawn
Coach	John Devine

== Managerial history ==
Tyrone Senior Football Manager
Dates	Name	Origin	Provincial titles	National titles
1890–1968	County Board Selection Committee		1956 Ulster SFC, 1957 Ulster SFC	
1968–1975	Jody O'Neill	Coalisland Na Fianna	1973 Ulster SFC	1972–73 NFL Division 2
1975–1977	Tom McKeagney	Augher St Macartan's	—N/a	—N/a
1978–1980	Jody O'Neill (2)	Coalisland Na Fianna	—N/a	—N/a
1980–1987	Art McRory	Dungannon Thomas Clarkes	1984 Ulster SFC, 1986 Ulster SFC	—N/a
1987–1989	Donal Donnelly	Omagh St Enda's	1989 Ulster SFC	—N/a
1989–1992	John Donnelly	Trillick St Macartan's	—N/a	—N/a
1992–1996	Art McRory (2)	Dungannon Thomas Clarkes	1995 Ulster SFC, 1996 Ulster SFC,	
1992–1996	Eugene McKenna	Augher St Macartan's	1995 Ulster SFC, 1996 Ulster SFC,	
1996–1999	Danny Ball	Clann na nGael	—N/a	—N/a
1999–2002	Art McRory (3)	Dungannon Thomas Clarkes	2001 Ulster SFC	2002 NFL Division 1,
1999–2002	Eugene McKenna (2)	Augher St Macartan's	2001 Ulster SFC	2002 NFL Division 1,
2002–2020	Mickey Harte	Errigal Ciarán	2007 Ulster SFC, 2009 Ulster SFC, 2010 Ulster SFC, 2016 Ulster SFC, 2017 Ulster SFC	2003 NFL Division 1, 2003 All-Ireland SFC, 2005 All-Ireland SFC, 2008 All-Ireland SFC, 2016 NFL Division 2
2020–2024	Feargal Logan	Stewartstown Harps	2021 Ulster SFC	2021 All-Ireland SFC
2020–2024	Brian Dooher	Clann na nGael	2021 Ulster SFC	2021 All-Ireland SFC
2025–	Malachy O'Rourke		—N/a	—N/a

== Players ==
=== Records ===
- For many decades, Frankie Donnelly held the record for the highest individual scoring tally in an inter-county match, with 4–11 against Fermanagh in the 1957 Dr Lagan Cup. James Naughton of Limerick broke Donnelly's record when he scored 4–12 against Waterford at Mick Neville Park in the 2025 National Football League.
- Upon retiring, Seán Cavanagh held the all-time outfield appearances record in championship football, with 89 appearances for his county.

==== Most Championship appearances ====
As of match played 28 July 2024

#	Name	Career	Apps
1	Seán Cavanagh	2002–2017	89
2	Peter Harte	2010–	78
3	Conor Gormley	2001–2014	75
4	Brian Dooher	1995–2011	73
5	Matthew Donnelly	2012–	70

=== All Stars ===
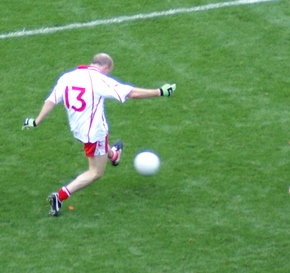
Peter Canavan strikes the ball with his foot during his county's 2005 All-Ireland Senior Football Championship final victory over Kerry; he won six All Stars.

== Kit evolution ==
Before the beginning of the 2024 season Tyrone revealed a new home jersey, which had the county's crest as a watermark on the lower left of its front.

1995 All-Ireland SFC finalists	2003 All-Ireland SFC champions	2016 Ulster SFC champions	2021 All-Ireland SFC champions

== Honours ==
Official honours, with additions noted.

=== National ===
- All-Ireland Senior Football Championship
  - (gold) Winners (4): 2003, 2005, 2008, 2021
  - (silver) Runners-up (3): 1986, 1995, 2018
- National Football League:
  - (gold) Winners (2): 2002, 2003
  - (silver) Runners-up (2): 1991–92, 2013
- National Football League Division Two
  - (gold) Winners (2): 1972–73, 2016
- All-Ireland Junior Football Championship
  - (gold) Winners (1): 1968
- All-Ireland Under-21 Football Championship
  - (gold) Winners (5): 1991, 1992, 2000, 2001, 2015
- All-Ireland Under-20 Football Championship
  - (gold) Winners (3): 2022, 2024, 2025
- All-Ireland Minor Football Championship
  - (gold) Winners (9): 1947, 1948, 1973, 1998, 2001, 2004, 2008, 2010, 2025
- All-Ireland Under-17 Football Championship
  - (gold) Winners (1): 2017
- All-Ireland Vocational Schools Championship
  - (gold) Winners (9): 1967, 1969, 1970, 1988, 1989, 1998, 2004, 2005, 2007

=== Provincial ===
- Ulster Senior Football Championship
  - (gold) Winners (16): 1956, 1957, 1973, 1984, 1986, 1989, 1995, 1996, 2001, 2003, 2007, 2009, 2010, 2016, 2017, 2021
  - (silver) Runners-up (7): 1890, 1941, 1972, 1980, 1988, 1994, 2005
- Dr McKenna Cup
  - (gold) Winners (17): 1957, 1973, 1978, 1982, 1984, 2004, 2005, 2006, 2007, 2012, 2013, 2014, 2015, 2016, 2017, 2019, 2020
- Dr Lagan Cup
  - (gold) Winners (3): 1943, 1957, 1958
- Ulster Junior Football Championship
  - (gold) Winners (3): 1968, 1983, 1986
- Ulster Under-21 Football Championship
  - (gold) Winners (12): 1972, 1973, 1980, 1990, 1991, 1992, 2000, 2001, 2002, 2003, 2006, 2015
- Ulster Under-20 Football Championship
  - (gold) Winners (4): 2022, 2024, 2025, 2026
- Ulster Minor Football Championship
  - (gold) Winners (27): 1931, 1934, 1946, 1947, 1948, 1967, 1971, 1972, 1973, 1975, 1976, 1978, 1988, 1993, 1997, 1998, 2001, 2003, 2004, 2007, 2008, 2010, 2012, 2021, 2022, 2025, 2026

=== Other ===
- RTÉ Sports Team of the Year Award
  - (gold) Winners (1): 2005
