= Coalisland Na Fianna GAC =

Tyrone-based Gaelic games club

Coalisland Fianna
- Na Fianna, Oileán an Ghuail
- Founded: 1903
- County: Tyrone
- Nickname: The Fianna, Blues
- Colours: Blue & White
- Grounds: Fr. Peter Campbell Park
- Coordinates: 54°32′35.15″N 6°41′25.05″W kit1 = Standard

Playing kits
Standard colours	Reserve

Senior Club Championships
	All Ireland	Ulster champions	Tyrone champions
Football:	-	-	10

Coalisland Fianna is a Gaelic Athletic Association club based in the town of Coalisland in County Tyrone, Northern Ireland. The club was founded in 1903 and its home is Fr. Peter Campbell Park

== Honours ==
- Tyrone Senior Football Championship (10)
  - 1904/05, 1907/08, 1928, 1930, 1946, 1955, 1989, 1990, 2010, 2018
- Tyrone Senior Football League (2)
  - 1989, 1991,
- Tyrone Intermediate Football Championship (1)
  - 1984
- Tyrone Intermediate Football League: (2)
  - 1978, 1984
- Tyrone Under 21 Football Championship: (7) 1984, 1985, 1986, 1987, 1988, 2007, 2008
- Tyrone Minor Football Championship: (10) 1943, 1950, 1952, 1961, 1982, 1985, 1991, 1995, 2000, 2006
- Ulster Minor Club Football Championship: 2006
