= 2025 Ulster Senior Club Football Championship =

Gaelic football competition

2025 AIB Ulster Senior Club Football Championship
Tournament details
- Province: Ulster
- Year: 2025
- Trophy: Seamus McFerran Cup
- Sponsor: Allied Irish Banks
- Date: 1 November – 13 December 2025
- Teams: 9 (one from each of the 9 counties)
- Defending champions: Errigal Ciarán

Winners
- Champions: Scotstown (5th win)
- Manager: David McCague
- Captain: Damien McArdle
- Qualify for: All-Ireland Club SFC

Runners-up
- Runners-up: Kilcoo
- Manager: Martin Corey
- Captain: Darryl Branagan

Other
- Website: Ulster GAA

The 2025 Ulster Senior Club Football Championship is the 57th instalment of the annual competition organised by Ulster GAA. It is one of the four provincial competitions of the 2025–26 All-Ireland Senior Club Football Championship and is played in a straight knockout format.

Tyrone's Errigal Ciarán were the 2024 champions, but lost the Tyrone semi-final and were unable to defend their title.

The semi-final match between Scotstown and Newbridge was originally scheduled for 23 November at O'Neills Healy Park in Omagh. The match was abandoned at half-time due to weather conditions with Scotstown four points ahead. The match was rescheduled for the following week at the Box-It Athletic Grounds in Armagh.

== Teams ==
The Ulster championship is contested by the winners of the nine county championships in the Irish province of Ulster. Ulster comprises the six counties of Northern Ireland, as well as Cavan, Donegal and Monaghan in the Republic of Ireland.

County	Team	Most recent success	
County	Team	Provincial	County
Antrim	Dunloy Cuchullains		1936
Armagh	Madden Raparees		
Cavan	Kingscourt Stars		2015
Derry	Newbridge		2024
Donegal	Naomh Conaill		2023
Down	Kilcoo	2021	2024
Fermanagh	Erne Gaels Belleek		2024
Monaghan	Scotstown	1989	2024
Tyrone	Loughmacrory		

== Bracket ==
Preliminary round

Quarter-finals

Semi-finals

Final

Kingscourt Stars (Cavan)
1–16

Erne Gaels (Fermanagh)
3–15

Erne Gaels (Fermanagh)
1–10

Kilcoo (Down)
4–12

Loughmacrory (Tyrone)
0–11

Kilcoo (Down)
0–16

Kilcoo (Down)
0–16

Scotstown (Monaghan)
0–19

Scotstown (Monaghan)
2–16

Naomh Conaill (Donegal)
0–16

Scotstown (Monaghan)
2–20 (4)

Newbridge (Derry)
2–20 (2)

Madden (Armagh)
0–12

Newbridge (Derry)
1–14

Newbridge (Derry)
0–18

Dunloy (Antrim)
0–11

== Preliminary round ==
1 November 2025
18:00
Preliminary Round

Newbridge (Derry)	1–14 – 0–11	Dunloy (Antrim)
Oisin Doherty 0–6 (0–4f, one 2pt), Callum McGrogan 1–0, Sean Young 0–2, Conor Doherty 0–2, Conleth McGrogan 0–2 (one 2pt), Mark McGrogan 0–1, Mark Doherty 0–1	Report	Keelan Molloy 0–6 (0–2f, one 2pt), Deaglan Smith 0–2 (one 2pt), Eoin O'Neill 0–1, Ryan McGarry 0–1, Seaan Elliott 0–1

Owenbeg, Dungiven
Referee: Kieran Eannetta (Tyrone)

== Quarter-finals ==
8 November 2025
17:30
Quarter-final 1

Kingscourt Stars (Cavan)	1–16 – 3–15 (a.e.t.)	Erne Gaels Belleek (Fermanagh)
Cian Shekleton 0–12 (0–2f, two 2pt), Jordan Morris 0–4 (one 2ptf), Cormac Yore 1–0	Report	Odhran Johnston 1–2 (one 2pt), Ultán Kelm 1–1, Jack McCann 1–0, Barry McCann 0–2 (one 2pt), Oisín Kelm 0–2 (one 2pt), Ryan Lyons 0–2, Shane Rooney 0–2 (0–1f), Aogán Kelm 0–1, Thomas McCaffrey 0–1, Seamus Ryder 0–1 (0–1f), Dan McCann 0–1

Kingspan Breffni, Cavan
Referee: Enda McFeely (Donegal)

8 November 2025
19:15
Quarter-final 2

Loughmacrory (Tyrone)	0–11 – 0–16	Kilcoo (Down)
Pauraic Meenagh 0–3 (one 2pt, 0–1f), Cathaoir Gallagher 0–3 (0–1f), Ruairí McCullagh 0–2 (0–2f), Eoin McElholm 0–2, Gareth Donaghy 0–1	Report	Paul Devlin 0–5 (one 2pt, 0–2f), Shealan Johnston 0–4 (one 2pt), Darryl Branagan 0–2, Ceilum Doherty 0–1, Ryan Johnston 0–1, Anthony Morgan 0–1, Miceal Rooney, Sean Óg McCusker 0–1

O'Neills Healy Park, Omagh
Referee: Martin McNally (Monaghan)

9 November 2025
13:30
Quarter-final 3

Scotstown (Monaghan)	2–16 – 0–16	Naomh Conaill (Donegal)
Max Maguire 0–7 (two 2pt), Darragh Murray 2–0, Jack McCarron 0–3, Kieran Hughes 0–2 (one 2pt), Tommy Mallen 0–1, Shane Carey 0–1, Francis Maguire 0–1, Nicky Sherlock 0–1	Report	Shea Malone 0–6 (three 2pt), Eoghan McGettigan 0–5, John O’Malley 0–2 (one 2pt); Keelan McGill 0–1, Brendan McDyer 0–1, Max Campbell 0–1

St Tiernach's Park, Clones
Referee: Paul Faloon (Down)

9 November 2025
15:30
Quarter-final 4

Madden (Armagh)	0–12 – 0–18	Newbridge (Derry)
Conor Grimley 0–8 (0–2f, three 2pt), Donal Rafferty 0–1, Niall Smith 0–1, Paidi Comiskey 0–1, Niall Grimley 0–1	Report	Oisin Doherty 0–5 (0–4f), Conor McAteer 0–4, Padraig McGrogan 0–2 (0–1 45), Sean Young 0–2, Eamon Young 0–2, Mark McGrogan 0–1, Shane McGrogan 0–1, Patrick McMullan 0–1

Box-It Athletic Grounds, Armagh
Referee: Sean Hurson (Tyrone)

== Semi-finals ==
22 November 2025
16:30
Semi-final 1

Erne Gaels Belleek (Fermanagh)	1–10 – 4–12	Kilcoo (Down)
Ryan Lyons 0–4 (two 2pt), Barry McCann 0–2 (one 2pt), Shane Rooney 0–1 (0–1f), Brian Mullin 0–1, Michael Óg McGarrigle 0–1, Dan McCann 0–1	Report	Paul Devlin 1–1, Eugene Branagan 1–1, Ceilum Doherty 1–1, Shealan Johnston 1–1, Anthony Morgan 0–2, Ryan Johnston 0–2, Miceal Rooney 0–1, Callum Rogers 0–1, Jack Devlin 0–1, Barra McEvoy 0–1 (0–1f)

Box-It Athletic Grounds, Armagh
Referee: Diarmuid Boylan (Monaghan)

30 November 2025
16:00
Semi-final 2

Scotstown (Monaghan)	2–20 – 2–20 (a.e.t.)	Newbridge (Derry)
Micheál McCarville 1–3 (one 2pt), Tommy Mallen 1–2, Rory Beggan 0–4 (one 2pt, one 2ptf), Mattie Maguire 0–3 (one 2pt), Francis Maguire 0–3, Jack McCarron 0–2 (0–1f), Darren Hughes 0–2, Shane Carey 0–1	Report	Oisin Doherty 0–6 (two 2pt), Sean Young 0–4 (one 2pt), Conor McAteer 0–4 (one 2pt), Patrick McMullan 1–0, Conor Doherty 1–0, Conleth McGrogan 0–2 (one 2pt), Eamon Young 0–2 (0–1f), Odhran McGlone 0–1, Callum McGrogan 0–1
Penalties
Rory Beggan; Jack McCarron; Kieran Hughes; Darren Hughes	4–2	Conor McAteer; Oisin Doherty; Conor Doherty; Sean Young

Box-It Athletic Grounds, Armagh
Referee: Joe McQuillan (Cavan)

== Final ==
13 December 2025
18:15
Final

Kilcoo (Down)	0–16 – 0–19 (a.e.t.)	Scotstown (Monaghan)
Paul Devlin 0–8 (two 2ptf, 0–3f), Seán Óg McCusker 0–3 (one 2pt), Niall Kane 0–2 (one 2pt), Aaron Morgan 0–1, Eugene Branagan 0–1, Callum Rogers 0–1	Report	Rory Beggan 0–11 (four 2ptf, 0–2 '45, 0–1f), Conor McCarthy 0–3 (one 2pt), Mattie Maguire 0–2, Kieran Hughes 0–2, Ryan O'Toole 0–1

Box-It Athletic Grounds, Armagh
Referee: Sean Hurson (Tyrone)

== Statistics ==
- Declan Bonner led Erne Gaels to a first win at this level, against Kingscourt Stars in the quarter-final.
