= 2024 Ulster Senior Club Football Championship =

Gaelic football competition

2024 AIB Ulster Senior Club Football Championship
Tournament details
- Province: Ulster
- Year: 2024
- Trophy: Seamus McFerran Cup
- Sponsor: Allied Irish Banks
- Date: 2 November – 8 December 2024
- Teams: 9 (one from each of the 9 counties)
- Defending champions: Glen

Winners
- Champions: Errigal Ciarán (3rd win)
- Manager: Enda McGinley
- Captain: Darragh Canavan
- Qualify for: All-Ireland Club SFC

Runners-up
- Runners-up: Kilcoo
- Manager: Karl Lacey
- Captain: Darryl Branagan; Aaron Morgan

Other
- Website: Ulster GAA

The 2024 Ulster Senior Club Football Championship is the 56th instalment of the annual competition organised by Ulster GAA. It is one of the four provincial competitions of the 2024–25 All-Ireland Senior Club Football Championship and is played in a straight knockout format.

Derry's Glen were the 2023 champions, but lost the Derry county final and were unable to defend their title.

Errigal Ciarán from Tyrone won the championship, beating Kilcoo of Down by a point in the final. This was Errigal's third Ulster title and their first since 2002.

== Teams ==
The Ulster championship is contested by the winners of the nine county championships in the Irish province of Ulster. Ulster comprises the six counties of Northern Ireland, as well as Cavan, Donegal and Monaghan in the Republic of Ireland.

County	Team	Most recent success	
County	Team	Provincial	County
Antrim	Erin's Own, Cargin		2023
Armagh	Clann Éireann		2021
Cavan	Crosserlough		2020
Derry	Newbridge		1989
Donegal	St Eunan's		2021
Down	Kilcoo	2021	2023
Fermanagh	Erne Gaels Belleek		1981
Monaghan	Scotstown	1989	2023
Tyrone	Errigal Ciarán	2002	2022

== Bracket ==
Preliminary round

Quarter-finals

Semi-finals

Final

Erne Gaels (Fermanagh)
0–6

Scotstown (Monaghan)
0–19

Scotstown (Monaghan)
0–14

Kilcoo (Down)
5–10

Kilcoo (Down)
0–15

Crosserlough (Cavan)
1–10

Kilcoo (Down)
0–10

Errigal Ciarán (Tyrone)
1–8

Newbridge (Derry)
0–12

Clann Éireann (Armagh)
0–14

Clann Éireann (Armagh)
1–10

Errigal Ciarán (Tyrone)
0–14

Erin's Own, Cargin (Antrim)
0–9

Errigal Ciarán (Tyrone)
0–12

Errigal Ciarán (Tyrone)
0–17

St Eunan's (Donegal)
0–10

== Preliminary round ==
2 November 2024
Preliminary Round

Errigal Ciarán (Tyrone)	0–12 – 0–10	St Eunan's (Donegal)
Ruairí Canavan 0–3 (0–1f, 0–1 '45), Ben McDonnell 0–3, Peter Harte 0–2, Peter Óg McCartan 0–1, Odhran Robinson 0–1, Mark Kavanagh 0–1, Tommy Canavan 0–1	Report	Shane O'Donnell 0–4, Conor O'Donnell Jr 0–3 (0–2f), Conor O'Donnell Sr 0–1, James Kelly 0–1, Niall O'Donnell 0–1

O'Neills Healy Park, Omagh
Referee: Noel Mooney (Cavan)

== Quarter-finals ==
16 November 2024
17:00
Quarter-final 1

Erne Gaels Belleek (Fermanagh)	0–6 – 0–19	Scotstown (Monaghan)
Dan McCann 0–2, Oisín Kelm 0–1, Ryan Lyons 0–1, Aogán Kelm 0–1, Shane Rooney 0–1	Report	Jack McCarron 0–9 (0–8f), Conor McCarthy 0–5, Micheál McCarville 0–1, Jason Carey 0–1, Shane Carey 0–1, Kieran Hughes 0–1, Mattie Maguire 0–1

Brewster Park, Enniskillen
Referee: Kieran Eannetta (Tyrone)

9 November 2024
18:00
Quarter-final 2

Kilcoo (Down)	0–15 – 1–10	Crosserlough (Cavan)
Paul Devlin 0–7 (0–5f), Ryan McEvoy 0–2 (0–1f), Jerome Johnston 0–2, Callum Rogers 0–1, Darryl Branagan 0–1, Ryan Johnston 0–1, Conor Laverty 0–1	Report	James Smith 1–1 (0–1m), Dara McVeety 0–2 (0–1m), Brandon Boylan 0–1 (0–1f), Oran Rehill 0–1 (0–1m), Shane McManus 0–1, Kieran Smith 0–1, Peter Smith 0–1, Emmett Boylan 0–1, Matthew Costello 0–1

Páirc Esler, Newry
Referee: Barry Cassidy (Derry)

10 November 2024
15:30
Quarter-final 3

Newbridge (Derry)	0–12 – 0–14	Clann Éireann (Armagh)
Oisin Doherty 0–4 (0–4f), Conor Doherty 0–2, Conor McAteer 0–2, Conleth McGrogan 0–1, Callum McGrogan 0–1, Conor McGrogan 0–1, Mark McGrogan 0–1	Report	Jack Conlon 0–4, Ruairi McDonald 0–2 (0–1f), Conor Turbitt 0–2 (0–1f), Ryan Owens 0–2, Conor McConville 0–2, Tiernan Kelly 0–1, Shea Heffron 0–1

Celtic Park, Derry
Referee: Paul Faloon (Down)

10 November 2024
13:00
Quarter-final 4

Erin's Own, Cargin (Antrim)	0–9 – 0–17	Errigal Ciarán (Tyrone)
Tomas McCann 0–6 (0–5f, 0–1 '45), John McNabb 0–1, Sean O'Neill 0–1, Ronan Gribbin 0–1	Report	Ruairí Canavan 0–4 (0–3f), Tommy Canavan 0–2 (0–2f), Darragh Canavan 0–2, Joe Oguz 0–2, Ciaran McGinley 0–2, Tiernan Colhoun 0–1, Peter Óg McCartan 0–1, Ben McDonnell 0–1, Mark Kavanagh 0–1, Ronan McRory 0–1

Corrigan Park, Belfast
Referee: Martin McNally (Monaghan)

== Semi-finals ==
23 November 2024
18:00
Semi-final 1

Scotstown (Monaghan)	0–14 – 5–10	Kilcoo (Down)
Rory Beggan 0–2 (0–2f), Jack McCarron 0–2 (0–1f), Darragh Murray 0–2, James Hamill 0–2, Shane Carey 0–1 (0–1f), Conor McCarthy 0–1, Micheál McCarville 0–1, Ross McKenna 0–1, Mark McPhillips 0–1, Emmett Caulfield 0–1	Report	Miceal Rooney 2–0, Christopher Rooney 1–1, Ceilum Doherty 1–0, Shane Carey 1–0 (own goal), Jerome Johnston 0–3 (0–1f), Ryan Johnston 0–2, Niall Kane 0–1 (0–1 '45), Aaron Morgan 0–1, Anthony Morgan 0–1, Shealan Johnston 0–1

Box-It Athletic Grounds, Armagh
Referee: Sean Hurson (Tyrone)

24 November 2024
15:15
Semi-final 2

Clann Éireann (Armagh)	1–10 – 0–14	Errigal Ciarán (Tyrone)
Conor Turbitt 1–2 (1–0 pen, 0–2f), Dan McCarthy 0–2, Daniel Magee 0–2, Tiernan Kelly 0–1, Conor McConville 0–1, Ruairi McDonald 0–1, Rioghan Meehan 0–1	Report	Ruairí Canavan 0–9 (0–4f), Darragh Canavan 0–2 (0–1f), Tommy Canavan 0–2 (0–2f), Odhran Robinson 0–1

Páirc Esler, Newry
Referee: Joe McQuillan (Cavan)

== Final ==
8 December 2024
15:30
Final

Kilcoo (Down)	0–10 – 1–8	Errigal Ciarán (Tyrone)
Paul Devlin 0–3 (0–2f), Miceal Rooney 0–2, Eugene Branagan 0–2, Niall Kane 0–1 (0–1f), Darryl Branagan 0–1, Anthony Morgan 0–1	Report	Joe Oguz 1–0, Tommy Canavan 0–3 (0–3f), Peter Óg McCartan 0–2, Darragh Canavan 0–1, Ciaran Quinn 0–1, Peter Harte 0–1

Box-It Athletic Grounds, Armagh
Attendance: 6,119
Referee: Noel Mooney (Cavan)
