= 2016 Dublin Senior Hurling Championship =

Annual hurling competition season

- Sponsor: Evening Herald
- Champions: Cuala (5th title); Oisín Gough (captain); Mattie Kenny (manager)
- Runners-up: Kilmacud Crokes; Bill O'Carroll (captain); Ollie Baker (manager)

The 2016 Dublin Senior Hurling Championship was the 129th staging of the Dublin Senior Hurling Championship since its establishment by the Dublin County Board in 1887.

Cuala entered the championship as the defending champions.

The final was played on 29 October 2016 at Parnell Park in Donnycarney, between Cuala and Kilmacud Crokes, in what was their second meeting in the final overall. Cuala won the match by 1–15 to 0–15 to claim their fifth championship title overall and a second consecutive title.

== Results ==
=== Final ===
29 October 2016 Final	Cuala	1-15 - 0-15	Kilmacud Crokes	Parnell Park
	C Cronin 1-3, D Treacy 0-5 (4f), N Kenny 0-3, M Schutte 0-2, S Moran and S Treacy 0-1 each.	Report	O O'Rorke 0-10 (5f, 2 65), D Mulligan 0-3, C Conway and F Whitely 0-1 each.
