= Con O'Callaghan (Gaelic footballer) =

Irish Gaelic footballer and hurler

Personal information
- Native name: Conal Ó Ceallacháin (Irish)
- Nickname: King Con
- Born: April 1996 (age 30) Dublin, Ireland
- Occupation: Accountant
- Height: 5 ft 11 in (180 cm)

Sport
- Sport: Gaelic football
- Position: Forward
Club
- Years: Club
- Cuala
Club titles
	Football	Hurling
Dublin titles	1	4
Leinster titles	1	2
All-Ireland titles	1	2
College
- Years: College
- University College Dublin
College titles
- Sigerson titles: 1
Inter-county*
Years	County	Apps (scores)
2016–	Dublin	51 (18–116)
Inter-county titles
- Leinster titles: 9
- All-Irelands: 6
- NFL: 3
- All Stars: 3
- *Inter County team apps and scores correct as of match played 29 June 2024.

Con O'Callaghan (born April 1996) is an Irish sportsman. He plays Gaelic football for the Dublin county football team.

O'Callaghan is a dual player for the Cuala club, in football senior "A" and hurling senior "A". He was also a dual player at inter-county minor level.

O'Callaghan is a capable free-taker; however, with Dublin he was not required to take them, when Dean Rock and Cormac Costello were on the field.

== Playing career ==
=== Club ===
O'Callaghan plays football and hurling for the Cuala club.

He is part of Cuala's Senior Hurling team and has won Dublin Senior 'A' titles in 2016, 2017, 2019 and 2020, Leinster Senior 'A' titles in 2016 and 2017 and All Ireland Senior 'A' titles in 2017 and 2018

He is part of Cuala's Senior Football team and has won Dublin Senior 'A', Leinster Senior 'A' and All Ireland Senior 'A' titles in 2024.

He is one of a small number of players to have won club All Ireland titles in both Hurling and Football.

Team	Year	Leinster		All-Ireland		Total	
Team	Year	Apps	Score	Apps	Score	Apps	Score
Cuala	2015–16	2	0–2	0	0–0	2	0–2
Cuala	2016–17	3	6–10	2	1–5	5	7–15
Cuala	2017–18	3	3–8	1	0–4	4	3–12
Total		8	9–20	3	1-09	11	10-29

=== College ===
O'Callaghan played for UCD and won the 2018 Sigerson Cup.

=== Inter-county ===
O'Callaghan made his football championship debut for Dublin against Laois in the quarter-final of the 2016 All-Ireland Senior Football Championship. He scored a single point against Laois as Dublin progressed to the Leinster semi-final. He made his second appearance against in Dublin's semi final victory over Meath and continued this trend in the final against Westmeath. He failed to make an appearance outside the Leinster Championship but won a medal as a squad member of the 2016 All-Ireland Champions Dublin.

2017 started with O'Callaghans first start as a senior inter-county footballer with Dublin. He started the game against Carlow in the quarter final of the Leinster Championship. He scored two points from frees and failed to score from play in the victory over a very defensive Carlow side. In the Leinster semi final against Westmeath, he scored his first points of the 2017 campaign from play. He scored a total of three points from play in Dublin's victory over Westmeath in the semi-final. In July 2017, he won his second Leinster senior football championship with Dublin what proved to be his most prolific game from a scoring point of view. He scored a total of 0–12 points against Kildare at Croke Park and helped guide Dublin to their seventh consecutive Leinster Championship title. He took six frees during the game and scored six points.

O'Callaghan won the All-Ireland Under 21 Football Championship with Dublin in 2017, scoring a total of 1–3 against Galway at O'Connor Park. O'Callaghan scored his first senior goal for Dublin in their 2017 All-Ireland Senior Football Championship semi-final win over Tyrone. In the 2017 All-Ireland Final, O'Callaghan scored a goal for Dublin after 90 seconds of play as they went on to win their third All-Ireland title in a row.

In November 2017, O'Callaghan won his first football All-Star award and was also named as the GAA/GPA Young Footballer of the Year.

He provided the assist for Niall Scully's goal in the 2018 All-Ireland Senior Football Championship Final.

By 2019, his physical development had reached remarkable proportions. Never physically light to begin with, he sported a shaven head to add to his tougher image. According to Alan Brogan, O'Callaghan had built a gym at the back of his house. In the 11th minute of a game against Roscommon, O'Callaghan collected a pass by Brian Fenton from above his head past the "D" and fell onto his twisted right leg. His former Dublin under-21 manager Dessie Farrell later remarked on the fall: "It was a model for a cruciate [injury], wasn't it?... I thought he was hurt the way he landed there for sure, but it's just a mark of his athleticism". O'Callaghan rose from the awkward fall without effort, immediately hopped the ball and sent it over the bar for a point. In the All-Ireland semi-final, he scored two goals past Lee Keegan and took a fierce hit from Mayo goalkeeper Rob Hennelly but was unaffected.

O'Callaghan was named captain of the Dublin senior football team ahead of the 2025 championship; he succeeded James McCarthy, who retired the previous year, after the captaincy was rotated during the 2025 National Football League.

== Career statistics ==
As of match played 29 June 2024

Team	Year	National League			Leinster		All-Ireland		Total	
Team	Year	Division	Apps	Score	Apps	Score	Apps	Score	Apps	Score
Dublin	2016	Division 1	1	0–0	3	0–1	0	0–0	4	0–1
Dublin	2017	Division 1	0	0–0	3	0–17	3	2–3	6	2–20
Dublin	2018	Division 1	1	0–0	3	1–7	4	1–3	8	2–10
Dublin	2019	Division 1	6	2–7	3	2–3	5	2–10	14	6–20
Dublin	2020	Division 1	2	1–6	3	0–4	2	1–5	7	2–15
Dublin	2021	Division 1	4	3–7	2	1–4	1	0–1	7	4–12
Dublin	2022	Division 1	0	0–0	3	2–13	0	0–0	3	2–13
Dublin	2023	Division 2	8	0–17	3	1–13	6	1–15	17	2–45
Dublin	2024	Division 2			3	3–8	4	1–9	7	4–17
Career total			22	6–37	26	10–70	25	8–46	73	24–153

== Honours ==
UCD

- Sigerson Cup: 2018

Cuala

Hurling

- All-Ireland Senior Club Hurling Championship: 2016-17, 2017-18
- Leinster Senior Club Hurling Championship: 2016-17, 2017-18
- Dublin Senior Hurling Championship: 2016, 2017, 2019, 2020

Football

- All-Ireland Senior Club Football Championship: 2024-25
- Leinster Senior Club Football Championship: 2024
- Dublin Senior Football Championship: 2024
- Dublin Senior B Football Championship: 2020

Dublin

- All-Ireland Senior Football Championship: 2016, 2017, 2018, 2019, 2020, 2023
- Leinster Senior Football Championship: 2016, 2017, 2018, 2019, 2020, 2021, 2022, 2023, 2024
- National Football League Division 1: 2016, 2018, 2021
- National Football League Division 2: 2023
- All-Ireland Under-21 Football Championship: 2017
- Leinster Under-21 Football Championship: 2016, 2017
- Leinster Minor Football Championship: 2014

Awards

- GAA/GPA Young Footballer of the Year: 2017
- Sunday Game Team of the Year: 2017, 2019, 2020
- GAA GPA All Stars Awards: 2017, 2019, 2020
- All-Ireland SFC Final Man of the Match: 2020
- AIB GAA Club Player of the Year (football): 2025
- AIB GAA Club Team of the Year (football): 2025
- AIB GAA Club Team of the Year (hurling): 2018

Sporting positions
Preceded by James McCarthy	Dublin senior football team captain 2025–	Succeeded by Incumbent
Awards and achievements
Preceded by Diarmuid O'Connor	GAA/GPA Young Footballer of the Year; 2017	Succeeded by David Clifford
Preceded by Dublin player (Dublin)	All-Ireland SFC final Man of the Match; 2020	Succeeded by
