= Austin O'Malley (Gaelic footballer) =

Irish Gaelic football manager and former player

Personal information
- Native name: Austin Ó Máille (Irish)
- Born: Louisburgh, County Mayo
- Occupation: Teacher

Sport
- Sport: Gaelic football
- Position: Full Forward
Clubs
- Years: Club
- 2006 2008–2010 2011–2013 2014–: Louisburgh; UCD; St Vincents; St Patrick's; Louisburgh
Club titles
- titles: 3
College
- Years: College
- IT Sligo
College titles
- Sigerson titles: 1
Inter-county
Years	County	Apps (scores)
2004–2009 2011–2013	Mayo; Wicklow	50 (7–114)
Inter-county titles
- Connacht titles: 3
- All-Irelands: 0
- NFL: 1

Austin O'Malley is an Irish Gaelic football manager and former player. He represented both the Mayo and Wicklow county teams.

== Career ==
O'Malley won three Connacht Senior Football Championship medals with Mayo. He was involved when Mayo lost the 2004 and 2006 All-Ireland Senior Football Championship finals.

O'Malley won the 2006 Dublin Senior Football Championship while playing for UCD. In 2011, he transferred to St Patrick's (Wicklow) after three years of playing with St Vincent's.

While playing for St Patrick's, O'Malley also lined out with the Wicklow county team. The transfer process story was leaked to Dublin newspaper, the Metro. While playing for Wicklow he won Division 4 of the National Football League.

As of 2011, he was a teacher at St Benildus College, where he uses the strength and ambition that he gained from years on the training pitch to discipline and motivate the pupils. In later years he formed a performance coaching consultancy, Hexagon Performance. In 2014, he transferred back to his native club Louisburgh in Co Mayo.

O'Malley began managing Cuala in 2022. After two Dublin SFC quarter-final exits in 2022 and 2023, he led that club to a first Dublin SFC title in 2024. He later managed Cuala to the Leinster Senior Club Football Championship title and the 2024–25 All-Ireland Senior Club Football Championship title. Then he resigned.

== Honours ==
=== Player ===
- Connacht Senior Football Championship (3): 2004, 2006, 2009
- Mayo Intermediate Football Championship (1): 2003
- Mayo Junior Football Championship (1): 2016
- Connacht Junior Club Football Championship (1): 2016
- Dublin Senior Football Championship (1): 2006
- Wicklow Senior Football Championship (1): 2012
- National Football League Division 4 (1): 2012
- Sigerson Cup (1): 2004

=== Manager ===
- Dublin Senior Football Championship (1): 2024
- Leinster Senior Football Championship (1): 2025
- 2024–25 All-Ireland Senior Club Football Championship (1): 2025

Achievements
Preceded by Malachy O'Rourke (Glen)	All-Ireland Club SFC winning manager 2025	Succeeded by Incumbent
