= 2025 Tyrone Senior Football Championship =

Gaelic football tournament

2025 Connollys of Moy Tyrone Senior Football Championship
Tournament details
- County: Tyrone
- Province: Ulster
- Level: Senior
- Year: 2025
- Trophy: O'Neill Cup
- Sponsor: Connollys Of Moy
- Date: 11 September – 26 October 2025
- Teams: 16
- Defending champions: Errigal Ciarán

Winners
- Champions: Loughmacrory
- Manager: Martin Boyle
- Captain: Nathan Kelly
- Qualify for: Ulster Club SFC

Runners-up
- Runners-up: Trillick
- Manager: Peter McGinnity; Richard Thornton
- Captain: Lee Brennan

Promotion/Relegation
- Relegated team(s): Derrylaughan; Gortin; Pomeroy

Other
- Matches played: 16
- Top Scorer: Ruairi McCullagh (0-27)

The 2025 Tyrone Senior Football Championship is the 120th edition of Tyrone GAA's premier Gaelic football tournament for senior clubs in County Tyrone, Ireland. The championship consists of 16 teams in a straight knock-out format. The draw for the competition was made on 25 June 2025, with All-Ireland Finalists Errigal Ciarán beginning their title defence against Ardboe.

In this year's competition, there will be another draw after each round to determine match ups for the subsequent rounds.

The draw for the Quarter-Finals took place at O'Neill Park, Dungannon on Sunday 14 September 2025, after the Galbally v Donaghmore 1st Round game.

The draw for the Semi-Finals took place at O'Neill Park, Dungannon on Sunday 28 September 2025, after the Donaghmore v Loughmacrory Quarter-Final game.

== Bracket ==
Round 1
Errigal Ciarán	4-21
Ardboe	1-07
Omagh	1-26
Derrylaughan	0-02
Dungannon	1-16
Trillick	0-23
Gortin	0-14
Pomeroy	1-18
Galbally	1-23
Donaghmore	3-24
Killyclogher	2-11
Loughmacrory	1-20
Dromore	2-16
Edendork	2-19
An Charraig Mhór	2-21
Moortown	1-14

Quarter-finals
Errigal Ciarán	2-12
Omagh	0-15
Trillick	1-13
Pomeroy	1-11
Donaghmore	2-10
Loughmacrory	1-17
Edendork	0-18
An Charraig Mhór	2-17

Semi-finals
Errigal Ciarán	1-11
Trillick	1-13
Loughmacrory	0-19 (1-16 R)
An Charraig Mhór	1-16 (4-6 R)

Final
Trillick	2-11
Loughmacrory	0-18

- The above bracket may be adjusted during the championship due to the new rule in which fresh draws are made to determine each round's fixtures.

== Team changes ==
The following teams have changed division since the 2024 championship season.

Promoted from 2024 Intermediate Division

- Derrylaughan Kevin Barry's (Intermediate Championship Winners)
- Gortin St. Patrick's (All-County League Division 2 Winners)
- Moortown St. Malachy's (All-County League Division 1/2 Playoff Winner)

Relegated to 2025 Intermediate Division

- Clonoe O'Rahilly's (All-County League Division 1/2 Playoff Loser)
- Coalisland Fianna (All-County League Division 1 Playoff Loser)
- Eglish St. Patrick's (16th in All-County League Division 1)

Match Programmes for the 2025 Championship can be viewed here: https://tyronegaa.ie/club-championship-2025/programmes/

== Round 1 ==
11 September 2025 Round 1	Errigal Ciarán	4-21 – 1-07	Ardboe	Dungannon
7:15PM	Ruairi Canavan 0-7 (2x2pt), Darragh Canavan 1-3, Odhran Robinson 1-2, Joe Oguz 1-1, Shea McDermott 1-0, Ben McDonnell 0-2, Peter Og McCartan 0-2 (1x2pt), Cormac Quinn, Cathair Quinn, Padraig McGirr and Thomas Canavan all 0-1 each.	Report	Cormac Devlin 1-1, Darragh Devlin 0-3, Jamie Concannon, Davin McKeown and Shay McGuigan all 0-1 each.	Stadium: O'Neill Park; Referee: Paul Gallagher (Castlederg)

12 September 2025 Round 1	Gortin	0-14 – 1-18	Pomeroy	Omagh
6:45PM	Sean Og McAleer 0-4 (1x2pt), Odhran Brolly 0-2, Liam Og Mossey 0-2, Peter Keenan 0-2 (1x2pt), Cian McConnell, Fiachra McNulty, Ruairi Keenan and Ciaran Brolly (0-1 each).	Report	Peter Rafferty 1-1, Ryan Loughran 0-4 (2x2pt), Ronan Duffin 0-3, Peter McGoldrick 0-3 (1x2pt), Frank Burns and Kevin Armstrong 0-2 each, Lorcan Kilpatrick, Ryan McCallan and Hugh McNamee 0-1 each.	Stadium: Healy Park; Referee: Fergal Ward (Errigal Ciarán)

12 September 2025 Round 1	Killyclogher	2-11 – 1-20	Loughmacrory	Omagh
8:30PM	Mark Bradley 0-4, Conal McCann 0-3, Tiernan McCann 0-3 (1x2pt), Gavin Potter 1-0, Dara Hayes 1-0, Oisin McCann 0-1.	Report	Ruairi McCullagh 0-6 (2x2pt), Ronan Fox 1-0, Pauraic Meenagh 0-3 (1x2pt), Arnoldas Macidulskas 0-2, Cathal Donaghy 0-2, Eoin McElholm 0-2, Cathaoir Gallagher 0-2, Shane Dobbs, Gareth Donaghy and Oisin O’Kane 0-1 each.	Stadium: Healy Park; Referee: Stephen Campbell (Stewartstown)

13 September 2025 Round 1	Dungannon	1-16 – 0-23	Trillick	Carrickmore
6:00PM	Paul Donaghy 0-9 (2x2pt), James Quinn 0-4, Lorcan Mallon 1-0, Dalaigh Jones 0-2 (1x2pt), Patrick Quinn 0-1.	Report	Lee Brennan 0-8 (3x2pt), Ciaran Daly 0-4 (2x2pt), James Garrity 0-3, Seanie O’Donnell 0-2, Liam Gray 0-2, Liam Corry 0-2, Ryan Gray and Mattie Donnelly 0-1 each.	Stadium: Páirc Colmcille; Referee: Sean Hurson (Galbally)

14 September 2025 Round 1	Omagh	1-26 – 0-02	Derrylaughan	Pomeroy
1:30PM	Ronan O’Neill 1-7, Fionnbharr Taggart 0-4 (2x2pt), Patrick Bradley and Connor O’Donnell (0-2, 1x2pt each), Oisin Miller, Tom Donaghy and Jason McAnulla 0-2 each, Ben Groogan, Damien McGuigan, Conan Campbell, Dan Haigney and Barry Tierney 0-1 each.	Report	Liam Cushnahan and Ciaran Quinn (0-1 each)	Stadium: Plunkett Park; Referee: Andrew McKenna (Eskra)

14 September 2025 Round 1	Dromore	2-16 – 2-19	Edendork	Pomeroy
3:15PM	Paudi Dillon 1-6 (1x2pt), Adrian McGurren 1-2, Mark McGale 0-2 (1x2pt), Aidan Colton, Peter Teague, Brian Gallagher, Ciaran McCoy, Oran Sludden and Niall Sludden (0-1 each).	Report	Darren McCurry 0-7 (2x2pt), Patrick McLernon 1-1, Niall Morgan 0-4 (1x2pt), Cormac Mallaghan 1-0, Harry Og Conlan 0-2 (1x2pt), Conor Mallon, Jake Ferguson, Stephen Corr, Rian Nelis and James Fearon 0-1 each.	Stadium: Plunkett Park; Referee: Mark Loughran (Errigal Ciarán)

14 September 2025 Round 1	An Charraig Mhór	2-21 – 1-14	Moortown	Dungannon
5:30PM	Danny Fullerton 2-7 (1x2pt), Lorcan McGarrity 0-7 (1x2pt), Cormac Munroe 0-2, Tiarnan Loughran 0-2, James Donaghy, Colm McCrory, and Niall Allison 0-1 each.	Report	Blaine Ryan 1-0, Ryan Kelly 0-4 (1x2pt), Sean Kelly 0-4 (2x2pt), Liam Lawn 0-3 (1x2pt), Peter Devlin 0-2 and Rian Smith 0-1.	Stadium: O'Neill Park; Referee: Sean Devenney (Drumquin)

14 September 2025 Round 1	Galbally	1-24 – 3-24	Donaghmore	Dungannon
7:15PM	Daniel Kerr 0-5 (1x2pt), Liam Rafferty 0-5 (2x2pt), Darragh Donaghy 1-1, Ronan Nugent 0-4 (2x2pt), Enda McGarrity 0-2 (1x2pt), Cormac Donnelly 0-2 (1x2pt), Mark Donnelly 0-3, Eoin O'Neill 0-2.	Report	Noah Grimes 1-5, Ronan Cassidy 1-4, Conor Cush 0-5, Feargal Donnelly 0-5 (2x2pt), Joey Clarke 1-1, Ryan Cush 0-3, Ronan Donnelly 0-1.	Stadium: O'Neill Park; Referee: Kieran Eannetta (Omagh)

== Quarter-finals ==
26 September 2025 Quarter-final	Trillick	1-13 – 1-11	Pomeroy	Omagh
7:30PM	Lee Brennan 0-7, Nathan Farry 1-0, Ciaran Daly 0-3 (1x2pt), Liam Gray 0-2, Simon Garrity 0-1.	Report	Kieran McGeary 0-7 (3x2pt), Brendan Burns 1-0, Hugh McNamee, Jude Campbell, Ronan Duffin and Frank Burns 0-1 each.	Stadium: Healy Park; Referee: Cathal Bell (Killeeshil)

27 September 2025 Quarter-final	Errigal Ciarán	2-12 – 0-15	Omagh	Carrickmore
5:00PM	Ciaran McGinley 1-1, Thomas Canavan 0-3 (1x2pt), Darragh Canavan 0-3, Shea McDermott 1-0, Peter Og McCartan 0-2, Niall Kelly, Odhran Robinson and Ruairi Canavan 0-1 each.	Report	Jason McAnulla 0-4, Oisin Miller 0-4, Ronan O’Neill 0-2, Damien McGuigan, Fionnbharr Taggart, Conan Grugan, Enda McCaffrey, Dan Haigney 0-1 each.	Stadium: Páirc Colmcille; Referee: Shane Meehan (Glenelly)

28 September 2025 Quarter-final	Edendork	0-18 – 2-17	An Charraig Mhór	Pomeroy
2:00PM	Darren McCurry 0-12 (2x2pt), Harry Og Conlan 0-3, Stephen Corr, Conor Mallon and Conn Kilpatrick 0-1 each.	Report	Danny Fulleron 0-9 (2x2pt), Rory Donnelly and Colly McCrory 1-0 each, Lorcan McGarrity 0-4 (1x2pt), James Donaghy 0-2, Cormac Munroe and Tiarnan Loughran 0-1 each.	Stadium: Plunkett Park; Referee: Mark Loughran (Errigal Ciarán)

28 September 2025 Quarter-final	Donaghmore	2-10 – 1-17	Loughmacrory	Dungannon
4:45PM	Joey Clarke 2-0, Cormac McCann 0-4, Ronan Cassidy, Ronan Donnelly and Conor Cush 0-2 each.	Report	Ruairi McCullagh 0-6 (1x2pt), Cathal Donaghy 0-3 (1x2pt), Pauraic Meenagh 0-3 (1x2pt), Oisin McCallan 1-0, Gareth Donaghy 0-2, Cathaoir Gallagher, Eoin McElholm and Shane Dobbs 0-1 each.	Stadium: O'Neill Park; Referee: Paul Gallagher (Castlederg)

== Semi-finals ==
12 October 2025 Semi-final	Loughmacrory	0-19 – 1-16	An Charraig Mhór	Pomeroy
2:30PM	Ruairi McCullagh 0-5, Eoin McElholm 0-4, Pauraic Meenagh 0-3, Cathal Donaghy 0-3 (1x2pt), Arnoldas Macidulskas 0-2 (1x2pt), Cathaoir Gallagher and Dara Curran 0-1 each.	Report	Tiarnan Loughran 1-3 (1x2pt), Lorcan McGarrity 0-5 (2x2pt), Ruairi Loughran 0-3 (1x2pt), Niall Allison 0-3, Seamus Sweeney and Cormac Monroe 0-1 each.	Stadium: Plunkett Park; Referee: Kieran Eannetta (Omagh)

12 October 2025 Semi-final	Errigal Ciarán	1-11 – 1-13	Trillick	Omagh
6:00PM	Ruairi Canavan 1-2, Darragh Canavan 0-3, Thomas Canavan 0-2, Peter Harte, Peter Og McCartan, Tiarnan Colhoun and Odhran Robinson 0-1 each.	Report	James Garrity 1-2, Mattie Donnelly 0-3, Simon Garrity 0-2, Liam Gray, Ciaran Daly, Rory Brennan, Daire Gallagher, Seanie O'Donnell and Lee Brennan 0-1 each.	Stadium: Healy Park; Referee: Sean Hurson (Galbally)

17 October 2025 Semi-final Replay	Loughmacrory	1-16 – 4-06	An Charraig Mhór	Omagh
7:30PM	Cathaoir Gallagher 1-2, Ruairi McCullagh 0-4 (1x2pt), Gareth Donaghy 0-3, Eoin McElholm 0-2 (1x2pt), Pauraic Meenagh 0-2, Shane Dobbs, Aodhan Donaghy and Cathal Donaghy 0-1 each.	Report	Tiarnan Loughran 2-1, Lorcan McGarrity 1-2, Aidan Woods 1-0, Jonathan Monroe 0-2, James Donaghy 0-1.	Stadium: Healy Park; Referee: Martin Conroy (Moy)

== Final ==
26 October 2025 Final	Trillick	2-11 – 0-18	Loughmacrory	Omagh
4:00PM	Ciaran Daly 2-0, Lee Brennan 0-5, Rory Brennan, Liam Gray, Mattie Donnelly, Charlie Donnelly, Richie Donnelly and Simon Garrity 0-1 each.	Report	Ruairi McCullagh 0-6, Cathal Donaghy 0-5 (1x2pt), Eoin McElholm 0-4 (1x2pt), Aodhan Donaghy, Cathaoir Gallagher and Gareth Donaghy 0-1 each.	Stadium: Healy Park; Referee: Mark Loughran (Errigal Ciaran)
