= Tyrone All-County Reserve Football Leagues =

- Current season or competition: 2026 Tyrone All-County Reserve Football Leagues
- Irish: Sraith Peile na gCúltaca Tír Eoghain
- Code: Gaelic football
- Founded: 1975
- Region: County Tyrone, Ulster (GAA)
- No. of teams: 50
- Title holders: Division 1: Dromore St. Dympna's (13th title)
- Most titles: Division 1: Errigal Ciaran (14 titles)
- Sponsors: Begley's Sports
- Official website: https://tyronegaa.ie/

The Tyrone All-County Reserve Football Leagues are annual Gaelic football competitions consisting of three tiers contested by Tyrone GAA clubs. Currently the three tiers are Division 1 (Senior), Division 2 (Intermediate) and Division 3/3A (Junior). The Tyrone County Board of the Gaelic Athletic Association has organised these competitions since 1975. All-County Senior Football Leagues are also held each season.

Player Eligibility: All Adult players, not in the 2026 Senior Inter County Football Squad, are eligible to participate in the Reserve ACL. A club will not be permitted in a Reserve ACL game to field any more than three players from those who played in the last 2025 Adult Club Championship game, which the Club participated in, within the county. Penalty: Offending Team forfeit league points.

Dromore St. Dympna's are the Division 1 title holders (2026).

Cookstown Fr. Rock's are the Division 2 title holders (2026).

Glenelly St. Joseph's are the Division 3 title holders (2026).

Tattyreagh St. Patrick's are the Division 3A title holders (2026).

== Roll of honour ==
	Division 1		Division 2	Division 3		Division 4	Division 5
1975	Augher		Omagh	Mountjoy		Pomeroy	Cookstown
1976	Ardboe		Owen Roes	Clonoe		Pomeroy	
1977	Ardboe		Dromore	Omagh		Gortin	
1978	Dromore		Owen Roes	Fintona		Dungannon	
1979	Dromore		Owen Roes	___________			
1980	Dromore		Augher	Strabane			
1981	Dromore		Coalisland	Beragh			
1982	Dromore		Dungannon	Glenelly			
1983	Dromore		Brackaville	Drumragh			
1984	Trillick		Coalisland	Drumquin			
1985	Ardboe		Edendork	Drumragh			
1986	Ballygawley		Aghyaran	Brocagh			
1987	Coalisland		Eglish	Kildress			
1988	Omagh		Eglish	Owen Roes			
1989	Trillick		Moortown	Strabane			
1990	Coalisland		Derrylaughan	Urney			
1991	Trillick		Urney	Newtownstewart			
1992	An Charraig Mhór		Edendork	Owen Roes			
1993	An Charraig Mhór		Edendork	Aghaloo			
1994	An Charraig Mhór		Killyclogher	Strabane			
1995	Errigal Ciaran		Derrylaughan	Strabane			
1996	Errigal Ciaran		Strabane	Donagheady (Clann Na nGael)			
1997	Errigal Ciaran		Gortin	Clann Na nGael			
1998	Ardboe		Kildress	Stewartstown			
	Div. 1A	Div. 1B	Division 2	Division 3			
1999	An Charraig Mhór	Dromore	Aghyaran	Pomeroy			
2000	Errigal Ciaran	Dungannon	Killeeshil	Augher			
2001	An Charraig Mhór	Edendork	Fintona	Newtownstewart			
2002	Errigal Ciaran	Dromore	Gortin	Urney			
2003	Dromore	Coalisland	Greencastle	Fintona			
2004	Errigal Ciaran	Clonoe	Greencastle	Beragh			
2005	An Charraig Mhór	Cookstown	Strabane	Beragh			
2006	Errigal Ciaran	Trillick	Eglish	Greencastle			
2007	Errigal Ciaran	Clonoe	Eskra	Tattyreagh			
	Division 1		Division 2	Division 3			
2008	An Charraig Mhór		Trillick	Strabane			
2009	Errigal Ciaran		Strabane	Dungannon			
2010	Errigal Ciaran		Eglish	Brackaville			
2011	Clonoe		Gortin	Brackaville			
2012	An Charraig Mhór		Cookstown	Tattyreagh			
2013	Dromore		Moortown	Loughmacrory			
2014	Omagh		Loughmacrory, Greencastle & Pomeroy	Tattyreagh			
2015	Dromore		Pomeroy	Clogher			
2016	Dromore		Loughmacrory	Clann Na nGael			
2017	Errigal Ciaran		Eglish	Owen Roes			
2018	Errigal Ciaran		Greencastle	Errigal Ciaran			
2019	Dromore		Galbally	Kildress			
2020	Coalisland		Eglish	Kildress			
2021	Errigal Ciaran		Greencastle	Eskra			
2022	Dromore		Pomeroy	Clann na nGael			
2023	An Charraig Mhór		Kildress	Cookstown			
2024	Errigal Ciaran		Kildress	Glenelly			
	Division 1		Division 2	Division 3	Division 3A		
2025	Omagh		Clonoe	Drumragh	Brackaville		
2026	Dromore		Cookstown	Glenelly	Tattyreagh		

== All-County Reserve League Division 1 Finals ==
Year	Winner	Score	Opponent	Score	Venue	Date
2020	Coalisland	2-14	Ardboe	0-10	Moortown	02/10/2020

== All-County Reserve League Division 2 Finals ==
Year	Winner	Score	Opponent	Score	Venue	Date
2020	Eglish	0-15	Moortown	0-12	Coalisland	12/05/2021

== All-County Reserve League Division 3 Finals ==
Year	Winner	Score	Opponent	Score	Venue	Date
2020	Kildress	0-13	Cookstown	1-08	Greencastle	15/05/2021

Notes
League Finals were held for all Divisions in 2020 as a result of each league being split into 2 sections due to the Covid-19 pandemic delaying the start of the season. The 2 section winners in each Division played each other in the League Final.

== All-County Reserve League Division 1/1A titles listed by club, 1975-2026 ==
#	Club	Wins	Years won
1	Errigal Ciaran	14	1995, 1996, 1997, 2000, 2002, 2004, 2006, 2007, 2009, 2010, 2017, 2018, 2021, 2024
2	Dromore St. Dympna's	13	1978, 1979, 1980, 1981, 1982, 1983, 2003, 2013, 2015, 2016, 2019, 2022, 2026
3	An Charraig Mhór; Naomh Colmcille	9	1992, 1993, 1994, 1999, 2001, 2005, 2008, 2012, 2023
4	Ardboe O'Donovan Rossa	4	1976, 1977, 1985, 1998
5	Coalisland Na Fianna	3	1987, 1990, 2020
5	Omagh St. Enda's	3	1988, 2014, 2025
5	Trillick St. Macartan's	3	1984, 1989, 1991
8	Augher St. Macartan's	1	1975
8	Ballygawley St. Ciaran's	1	1986
8	Clonoe O'Rahilly's	1	2011

== All-County Reserve League Division 1B titles listed by club, 1999-2007 ==
#	Club	Wins	Years won
1	Clonoe O'Rahilly's	2	2004, 2007
1	Dromore St. Dympna's	2	1999, 2002
3	Coalisland Na Fianna	1	2003
3	Cookstown Fr. Rock's	1	2005
3	Dungannon Thomas Clarkes	1	2000
3	Edendork St. Malachy's	1	2001
3	Trillick St. Macartan's	1	2006

== All-County Reserve League Division 2 titles listed by club, 1975-2026 ==
#	Club	Wins	Years won
1	Eglish St. Patrick's	6	1987, 1988, 2006, 2010, 2017, 2020
2	Greencastle St. Patrick's	5	2003, 2004, 2014, 2018, 2021
3	Edendork St. Malachy's	3	1985, 1992, 1993
3	Gortin St. Patrick's	3	1997, 2002, 2011
3	Kildress Wolfe Tones	3	1998, 2023, 2024
3	Owen Roe O'Neill's	3	1976, 1978, 1979
3	Pomeroy Plunketts	3	2014, 2015, 2022
3	Strabane Sigerson's	3	1996, 2005, 2009
9	Aghyaran St. Davog's	2	1986, 1999
9	Coalisland Na Fianna	2	1981, 1984
9	Cookstown Fr. Rock's	2	2012, 2026
9	Derrylaughan Kevin Barry's	2	1990, 1995
9	Loughmacrory St. Teresa's	2	2014, 2016
9	Moortown St. Malachy's	2	1989, 2013
15	Augher St. Macartan's	1	1980
15	Brackaville Owen Roes	1	1983
15	Clonoe O'Rahilly's	1	2025
15	Dromore St. Dympna's	1	1977
15	Dungannon Thomas Clarkes	1	1982
15	Eskra Emmetts	1	2007
15	Fintona Pearses	1	2001
15	Galbally Pearses	1	2019
15	Killeeshil St. Mary's	1	2000
15	Killyclogher St. Mary's	1	1994
15	Omagh St. Enda's	1	1975
15	Trillick St. Macartan's	1	2008
15	Urney St. Columba's	1	1991

== All-County Reserve League Division 3 titles listed by club, 1975-2026 ==
#	Club	Wins	Years won
1	Strabane Sigerson's	5	1980, 1989, 1994, 1995, 2008
2	Clann Na nGael	4	1996, 1997, 2016, 2022
3	Beragh Red Knights	3	1981, 2004, 2005
3	Drumragh Sarsfields	3	1983, 1985, 2025
3	Glenelly St. Joseph's	3	1982, 2024, 2026
3	Kildress Wolfe Tones	3	1987, 2019, 2020
3	Owen Roe O'Neill's	3	1988, 1992, 2017
3	Tattyreagh St. Patrick's	3	2007, 2012, 2014
9	Brackaville Owen Roes	2	2010, 2011
9	Fintona Pearses	2	1978, 2003
9	Newtownstewart St. Eugene's	2	1991, 2001
9	Urney St. Columba's	2	1990, 2002
13	Aghaloo O'Neills	1	1993
13	Augher St. Macartan's	1	2000
13	Brocagh Emmetts	1	1986
13	Clogher Eire Óg	1	2015
13	Clonoe O'Rahilly's	1	1976
13	Cookstown Fr. Rock's	1	2023
13	Drumquin Wolfe Tones	1	1984
13	Dungannon Thomas Clarkes	1	2009
13	Errigal Ciaran	1	2018
13	Eskra Emmetts	1	2021
13	Greencastle St. Patrick's	1	2006
13	Loughmacrory St. Teresa's	1	2013
13	Mountjoy Emmetts	1	1975
13	Omagh St. Enda's	1	1977
13	Pomeroy Plunketts	1	1999
13	Stewartstown Harps	1	1998

== All-County Reserve League Division 3A titles listed by club 2025-2026 ==
#	Club	Wins	Years won
1	Brackaville Owen Roes	1	2025
1	Tattyreagh St. Patrick's	1	2026

== All-County Reserve League Division 4 titles listed by club, 1975-1978 ==
#	Club	Wins	Years won
1	Pomeroy Plunketts	2	1975, 1976
2	Gortin St. Patrick's	1	1977
2	Dungannon Thomas Clarkes	1	1978

== All-County Reserve League Division 5 titles listed by club ==
#	Club	Wins	Years won
1	Cookstown Fr. Rock's	1	1975
