= 2015 Dublin Senior Hurling Championship =

Annual hurling competition season

- Sponsor: Evening Herald
- Champions: Cuala (4th title); Oisín Gough (captain); Mattie Kenny (manager)
- Runners-up: St Jude's

The 2015 Dublin Senior Hurling Championship was the 128th staging of the Dublin Senior Hurling Championship since its establishment by the Dublin County Board in 1887.

Kilmacud Crokes entered the championship as the defending champions.

The final was played on 31 October 2015 at Parnell Park in Donnycarney, between Cuala and St Jude's, in what was their first ever meeting in the final. Cuala won the match by 3–14 to 0–13 to claim their fourth championship title overall and a first title in 21 years.

== Results ==
=== Final ===
| 31 October 2015 Final | Cuala | 3-14 - 0-13 | St Jude's | Parnell Park |
| | S Treacy 2-1, D Treacy 0-7 (0-5f, 0-1 '65', 0-1 sideline), C Cronin 1-2, D O'Connell 0-3, M Schutte 0-1. | Report | F Ó Riain Broin (3f), D Sutcliffe 0-3 each, W Hutchinson (f), R Hardy, P Maguire, J Kennedy, R Joyce, J McManus, T Devlin 0-1 each. |
