= Tyrone All-County Senior Football Leagues =

Gaelic Football Competition

- Current season or competition: 2026 Tyrone All-County Senior Football Leagues
- Irish: Sraith Peile na Sinsear Tír Eoghain
- Code: Gaelic football
- Founded: 1969
- Region: County Tyrone, Ulster (GAA)
- Trophy: Division 1: Brendan Dolan Memorial Trophy
- No. of teams: 50
- Title holders: Division 1: Killyclogher St. Mary's (4th title)
- Most titles: Division 1: An Charraig Mhór; Trillick St. Macartan's (10 titles)
- Sponsors: Begley's Sports
- Official website: https://tyronegaa.ie/

The Tyrone All-County Senior Football Leagues are annual Gaelic football competitions consisting of three tiers contested by Tyrone GAA clubs. Currently the three tiers are Division 1 (Senior), Division 2 (Intermediate) and Division 3 (Junior). Division 3 is split into 2 sections - 3 and 3A. The Tyrone County Board of the Gaelic Athletic Association has organised these competitions since 1969. All-County Reserve Football Leagues are also held each season.

Killyclogher St. Mary's are the current Division 1 title holders (2026).

Naomh Eoghan are the Division 2 title holders (2026).

Fintona Pearses are the Division 3 title holders (2026).

Tattyreagh St. Patrick's are the Division 3A title holders (2026).

== History ==
1931: District leagues established under East and West Boards.

1969: All-County Senior Leagues established under control of A.C.L. Board — Intermediate and Junior Leagues remaining as regional competitions under district boards.

1975: All-County League system adopted for all grades in a six-division setup — Division 1 and Division 2 (Senior), Division 3 and Division 4 (Intermediate), Division 5A West and Division 5B East (Junior). Reserve Leagues and Championship are also established.

1979: Three 16-team divisions established and adopted for one-year trial.

1980: The three-division system adopted officially — Division 1 (Senior), Division 2 (Intermediate), Division 3 (Junior). Promotion/relegation playoffs introduced.

1999: A four-division system adopted — Division 1A and Division 1B (Senior), Division 2 (Intermediate), Division 3 (Junior). Twelve teams in each division.

2000: Four divisions adapted as follows: Division 1A - 16 teams (single round); Division 1B - 8 teams (double round); Division 2 - 16 teams (single round); Division 3 - 8 teams (double round).

2003: A return to the 4 X 12 Division system was adopted — Division 1A and Division 1B (Senior), Division 2 (Intermediate), Division 3 (Junior). Twelve teams in each division.

2008: A return to the three-division system was adopted — Division 1 (Senior), Division 2 (Intermediate), Division 3 (Junior).

2025: Div. 3 (Junior) is split into two sections — Division 3 and Division 3A.

== Roll of honour ==
	All-County		Divisional			
	Senior		Intermediate		Junior	
Year	Div. A	Div. B	East	West	East	West
1969	An Charraig Mhór	Derrylaughan	Brackaville	Aghyaran	Moortown	Fintona
1970	Ardboe	Trillick	Mountjoy	Owen Roes	Derrytresk	Dregish
1971	Stewartstown	Donaghmore	Moortown	Ballygawley	Galbally	Eskra
1972	Ardboe	Coalisland	Clonoe	Beragh	Moy	Greencastle
1973	Trillick	Stewartstown	Moy	Urney	Eglish II	Strabane
1974	Ardboe	Ballygawley	Kildress	Dromore	Killeeshil	Loughmacrory
	All-County leagues - all grades (est. 1975)					
	Senior		Intermediate		Junior	
	Div. 1	Div. 2	Div. 3	Div. 4	Div. 5	
1975	Ardboe	Stewartstown	Killyman	Moortown	Cookstown	
1976	Eglish	Donaghmore	Clonoe	Drumragh	Gortin	
1977	Trillick	Dromore	Aghyaran	Gortin	Killyclogher	
	Div. 1	Div. 2	Div. 3	Div. 4	Div. 5	Div. 6
1978	Ardboe	Coalisland	Fintona	Killyclogher	Mountjoy	Cookstown
	Division 1		Division 2		Division 3	
1979	An Charraig Mhór		Killyclogher		Brackaville	
1980	Omagh		Augher		Killeeshil	
1981	Ardboe		Owen Roes		Beragh	
1982	Trillick		Dungannon		Drumquin	
1983	Trillick		Aghyaran		Drumragh	
1984	Trillick		Coalisland		Pomeroy	
1985	Trillick		Edendork		Clogher	
1986	Augher		Donaghmore		Eskra	
1987	Trillick		Killyclogher		Derrytresk	
1988	Omagh		Cookstown		Beragh	
1989	Coalisland		Moortown		Stewartstown	
1990	Omagh		Ardboe		Errigal Ciaran II (Glencull)	
1991	Coalisland		Galbally		Newtownstewart	
1992	An Charraig Mhór		Killyclogher		Derrytresk	
1993	An Charraig Mhór		Cookstown		Rock	
1994	An Charraig Mhór		Edendork		Derrytresk	
1995	An Charraig Mhór		Clonoe		Strabane	
1996	Errigal Ciaran		Killyclogher		Killeeshil	
1997	Errigal Ciaran		Clonoe		Clann Na nGael	
1998	An Charraig Mhór		Clann Na nGael		Tattyreagh	
	Div. 1A	Div. 1B	Division 2		Division 3	
1999	Errigal Ciaran	Donaghmore	Aghyaran		Pomeroy	
2000	An Charraig Mhór	Kildress	Beragh		Augher	
2001	Killyclogher	Loughmacrory	Drumquin		Newtownstewart	
2002	Errigal Ciaran	Clann Na nGael	Rock		Urney	
2003	Dromore	Coalisland	Derrylaughan		Owen Roes	
2004	Dromore	Clonoe	Pomeroy		Drumragh	
2005	Errigal Ciaran	Cookstown	Drumquin		Killyman	
2006	Dromore	Galbally	Derrylaughan		Greencastle	
2007	Dromore	Clonoe	Eglish		Rock	
	Division 1		Division 2		Division 3	
2008	Dromore		Moy		Strabane	
2009	Errigal Ciaran		Cookstown		Aghaloo	
2010	Errigal Ciaran		Eglish		Stewartstown	
2011	Dromore		Edendork		Killeeshil	
2012	Clonoe		Cookstown		Dungannon	
2013	An Charraig Mhór		Moortown		Loughmacrory	
2014	Killyclogher		Greencastle		Rock	
2015	Clonoe		Galbally		Aghaloo	
2016	Dromore		Donaghmore		Castlederg	
2017	Errigal Ciaran		Derrylaughan		Owen Roes	
2018	Errigal Ciaran		Eglish		Clogher	
2019	Dromore		Galbally		Aghaloo	
2020	Killyclogher		Edendork		Killeeshil	
2021	An Charraig Mhór		Greencastle		Eskra	
2022	Trillick		Eglish		Stewartstown	
2023	Trillick		Clonoe		Cookstown	
2024	Dungannon		Gortin		Drumquin	
	Division 1		Division 2		Div. 3	Div. 3A
2025	Trillick		Clonoe		Cookstown	Derrytresk
2026	Killyclogher		Naomh Eoghan		Fintona	Tattyreagh

== All-County League Division 1 Finals ==
Year	Winner	Score	Opponent	Score	Venue	Date
1995	An Charraig Mhór	2-06	Moortown	1-06	Coalisland	27/01/1996
1996	Errigal Ciaran	0-10	An Charraig Mhór	0-07	Fintona	22/12/1996
	Errigal Ciaran were awarded league title after final was abandoned in injury time.					
2004	Dromore	0-13	An Charraig Mhór	1-08	Fintona	05/12/2004
2005	Errigal Ciaran	1-07	An Charraig Mhór	0-09	Pomeroy	11/12/2005
2006	Dromore	0-12	Donaghmore	0-05	Killeeshil	11/11/2006
2007	Dromore	0-09	An Charraig Mhór	0-07	Omagh	30/11/2007
2008	No playoffs held. Title awarded to Dromore who finished top of Division 1 after 15 rounds.					
2009	Errigal Ciaran	2-09	An Charraig Mhór	0-15	Omagh	30/10/2009
	Errigal Ciaran	0-10	An Charraig Mhór	0-06	Pomeroy	07/11/2009
2010	Errigal Ciaran	1-13	Coalisland	1-08	Eglish	21/11/2010
2011	Dromore	0-11	An Charraig Mhór	0-06	Dunmoyle	13/11/2011
2012	Clonoe	1-09	Coalisland	0-07	Edendork	01/12/2012
2013	An Charraig Mhór	2-10	Ardboe	0-14	Omagh	26/11/2013
2014	Killyclogher	1-09	Dromore	0-08	Carrickmore	26/10/2014
2015	Clonoe	1-11	An Charraig Mhór	1-05	Eoghan Ruadh, Dungannon	08/11/2015
2016	Dromore	3-13	Killyclogher	0-10	Loughmacrory	04/12/2016
2017	Errigal Ciaran	2-13	Coalisland	0-09	Carrickmore	28/10/2017
2018	Errigal Ciaran	0-14	Omagh	0-11	Killyclogher	11/11/2018
2019	Dromore	1-10	Errigal Ciaran	1-06	Fintona	09/11/2019
2020	Killyclogher	2-13	Dromore	0-19	Omagh	03/10/2020
	Killyclogher won 3-2 on penalties, after extra time.					
2021	No playoffs held. Title awarded to An Charraig Mhór who finished top of Division 1 after 17 rounds.					
2022	Trillick	0-10	Killyclogher	0-08	Dromore	15/10/2022
2023	Trillick	0-08	An Charraig Mhór	0-07	Omagh	10/12/2023
2024	Dungannon	1-13	An Charraig Mhór	0-08	Augher	21/12/2024
2025	Trillick	1-17	Dungannon	0-07	Carrickmore	02/11/2025

Notes
League Final playoffs for Division 1 were held in 1995 and 1996 as a special arrangement for Tyrone Seniors reaching the latter stages of the All-Ireland Football series. The playoffs were re-introduced in 2004.

2021 - An Charraig Mhór defeated Errigal Ciaran 0-08 to 0-06 in the final round of 17 on 18/12/2021 to clinch the league title at Dunmoyle.

No Top 4 Playoffs or League Final took place in 2026.

== All-County League Division 2 Finals ==
Year	Winner	Score	Opponent	Score	Venue	Date
2020	Edendork	3-21	Eglish	0-07	Donaghmore	03/10/2020

== All-County League Division 3 Finals ==
Year	Winner	Score	Opponent	Score	Venue	Date
2020	Killeeshil	3-11	Cookstown	1-04	Galbally	16/05/2021

Notes
League Finals were held for all Divisions in 2020 as a result of each league being split into 2 sections due to the Covid-19 pandemic delaying the start of the season. The 2 section winners in each Division played each other in the League Final.

== All-County League Division 5 Finals ==
Year	Winner	Score	Opponent	Score	Venue	Date
1975	Cookstown	1-04	Fintona	1-04	Pomeroy	16/11/1975
(r)	Cookstown	3-06	Fintona	1-04	Pomeroy	23/11/1975
1976	Gortin	0-10	Killeeshil	0-06	Pomeroy	31/10/1976
1977	Killyclogher	0-07	Galbally	0-03	Pomeroy	27/11/1977

Notes
League Finals were held for Division 5 from 1975-1977. The 2 Divisional winners - 5A (West) and 5B (East) played each other in the All-County League Final.

== All-County Senior League titles (top division - 1/1A/A) listed by club, 1969-2026 ==
#	Club	Wins	Years won
1	Trillick St. Macartan's	10	1973, 1977, 1982, 1983, 1984, 1985, 1987, 2022, 2023, 2025
1	An Charraig Mhór Naomh Colmcille	10	1969, 1979, 1992, 1993, 1994, 1995, 1998, 2000, 2013, 2021
3	Errigal Ciaran	9	1996, 1997, 1999, 2002, 2005, 2009, 2010, 2017, 2018
4	Dromore St. Dympna's	8	2003, 2004, 2006, 2007, 2008, 2011, 2016, 2019
5	Ardboe O'Donovan Rossa	6	1970, 1972, 1974, 1975, 1978, 1981
6	Killyclogher St. Mary's	4	2001, 2014, 2020, 2026
7	Omagh St. Enda's	3	1980, 1988, 1990
8	Coalisland Na Fianna	2	1989, 1991
8	Clonoe O'Rahilly's	2	2012, 2015
10	Augher St. Macartan's	1	1986
10	Dungannon Thomas Clarkes	1	2024
10	Eglish St. Patrick's	1	1976
10	Stewartstown Harps	1	1971

== All-County Senior League titles (lower division - 1B/B/2) listed by club, 1969-1978, 1999-2007 ==
#	Club	Wins	Years won
1	Coalisland Na Fianna	3	1972, 1978, 2003
1	Donaghmore St. Patrick's	3	1971, 1976, 1999
3	Clonoe O'Rahilly's	2	2004, 2007
3	Stewartstown Harps	2	1973, 1975
5	Ballygawley St. Ciaran's	1	1974
5	Clann Na nGael	1	2002
5	Cookstown Fr. Rock's	1	2005
5	Derrylaughan Kevin Barry's	1	1969
5	Dromore St. Dympna's	1	1977
5	Galbally Pearses	1	2006
5	Kildress Wolfe Tones	1	2000
5	Loughmacrory St. Teresa's	1	2001
5	Trillick St. Macartan's	1	1970

== All-County Intermediate League titles (top division - 2/3) listed by club, 1975-2026 ==
#	Club	Wins	Years won
1	Clonoe O'Rahilly's	5	1976, 1995, 1997, 2023, 2025
2	Cookstown Fr. Rock's	4	1988, 1993, 2009, 2012
2	Edendork St. Malachy's	4	1985, 1994, 2011, 2020
2	Eglish St. Patrick's	4	2007, 2010, 2018, 2022
2	Killyclogher St. Mary's	4	1979, 1987, 1992, 1996
6	Aghyaran St. Davog's	3	1977, 1983, 1999
6	Derrylaughan Kevin Barry's	3	2003, 2006, 2017
6	Galbally Pearses	3	1991, 2015, 2019
9	Donaghmore St. Patrick's	2	1986, 2016
9	Drumquin Wolfe Tones	2	2001, 2005
9	Greencastle St. Patrick's	2	2014, 2021
9	Moortown St. Malachy's	2	1975, 1989, 2013
13	Ardboe O'Donovan Rossa	1	1990
13	Augher St. Macartan's	1	1980
13	Beragh Red Knights	1	2000
13	Coalisland Na Fianna	1	1984
13	Clann Na nGael	1	1998
13	Dungannon Thomas Clarkes	1	1982
13	Fintona Pearses	1	1978
13	Gortin St. Patrick's	1	2024
13	Killyman St. Mary's	1	1975
13	Moy Tír na nÓg	1	2008
13	Naomh Eoghan	1	2026
13	Owen Roe O'Neill's	1	1981
13	Pomeroy Plunketts	1	2004
13	Rock St. Patrick's	1	2002

== All-County Intermediate League titles (lower division - 4) listed by club, 1975-1978 ==
#	Club	Wins	Years won
1	Drumragh Sarsfields	1	1976
1	Gortin St. Patrick's	1	1977
1	Killyclogher St. Mary's	1	1978
1	Moortown St. Malachy's	1	1975

== All-County Junior League titles (top division - 3/5) listed by club, 1975-2026 ==
#	Club	Wins	Years won
1	Killeeshil St. Mary's	4	1980, 1996, 2011, 2020
2	Aghaloo O'Neill's	3	2009, 2015, 2019
2	Cookstown Fr. Rock's	3	1975, 2023, 2025
2	Derrytresk Fir An Chnoic	3	1987, 1992, 1994
2	Rock St. Patrick's	3	1993, 2007, 2014
2	Stewartstown Harps	3	1989, 2010, 2022
7	Beragh Red Knights	2	1981, 1988
7	Clogher Eire Óg	2	1985, 2018
7	Drumragh Sarsfields	2	1983, 2004
7	Drumquin Wolfe Tones	2	1982, 2024
7	Eskra Emmetts	2	1986, 2021
7	Newtownstewart St. Eugene's	2	1991, 2001
7	Owen Roe O'Neill's	2	2003, 2017
7	Pomeroy Plunketts	2	1984, 1999
7	Strabane Sigerson's	2	1995, 2008
16	Augher St. Macartan's	1	2000
16	Brackaville Owen Roes	1	1979
16	Castlederg St. Eugene's	1	2016
16	Clann Na nGael	1	1997
16	Dungannon Thomas Clarkes	1	2012
16	Errigal Ciaran II	1	1990
16	Fintona Pearses	1	2026
16	Killyman St. Mary's	1	2005
16	Gortin St. Patrick's	1	1976
16	Greencastle St. Patrick's	1	2006
16	Killyclogher St. Mary's	1	1977
16	Loughmacrory St. Teresa's	1	2013
16	Mountjoy Emmetts	1	1978
16	Tattyreagh St. Patrick's	1	1998
16	Urney St. Columba's	1	2002

== All-County Junior League titles (lower division - 3A/6) listed by club, 1978, 2025-2026 ==
#	Club	Wins	Years won
1	Cookstown Fr. Rock's	1	1978
1	Derrytresk Fir An Chnoic	1	2025
1	Tattyreagh St. Patrick's	1	2026

== All-County Junior League titles (west division - 5A) listed by club, 1975-1977 ==
#	Club	Wins	Years won
1	Fintona Pearses	1	1975
1	Gortin St. Patrick's	1	1976
1	Killyclogher St. Mary's	1	1977

== All-County Junior League titles (east division - 5B) listed by club, 1975-1977 ==
#	Club	Wins	Years won
1	Cookstown Fr. Rock's	1	1975
1	Galbally Pearses	1	1977
1	Killeeshil St. Mary's	1	1976

== Divisional Intermediate League titles (east) listed by club, 1969-1974 ==
#	Club	Wins	Years won
1	Brackaville Owen Roes	1	1969
1	Clonoe O'Rahilly's	1	1972
1	Kildress Wolfe Tones	1	1974
1	Moortown St. Malachy's	1	1971
1	Moy Tír na nÓg	1	1973
1	Mountjoy Emmetts	1	1970

== Divisional Intermediate League titles (west) listed by club, 1969-1974 ==
#	Club	Wins	Years won
1	Aghyaran St. Davog's	1	1969
1	Ballygawley St. Ciaran's	1	1971
1	Beragh Red Knights	1	1972
1	Dromore St. Dympna's	1	1974
1	Owen Roe O'Neill's	1	1970
1	Urney St. Columba's	1	1973

== Divisional Junior League titles (east) listed by club, 1969-1974 ==
#	Club	Wins	Years won
1	Derrytresk Fir An Chnoic	1	1970
1	Eglish St. Patrick's II	1	1973
1	Galbally Pearses	1	1971
1	Killeeshil St. Mary's	1	1974
1	Moortown St. Malachy's	1	1969
1	Moy Tír na nÓg	1	1972

== Divisional Junior League titles (west) listed by club, 1969-1974 ==
#	Club	Wins	Years won
1	Dregish St. Mary's	1	1970
1	Eskra Emmetts	1	1971
1	Fintona Pearses	1	1969
1	Greencastle St. Patrick's	1	1972
1	Loughmacrory St. Teresa's	1	1974
1	Strabane Lámh Dhearg	1	1973
