= Darragh Canavan =

Tyrone Gaelic footballer

Personal information
- Native name: Dáire Ó Ceannubháin (Irish)
- Born: 2000 (age 25–26)

Sport
- Sport: Gaelic football
- Position: Forward
Club
- Years: Club
- 2018–: Errigal Ciarán
Club titles
- Tyrone titles: 2
- Ulster titles: 1
College titles
- Sigerson titles: 1
Inter-county
- Years: County
- 2018–: Tyrone
Inter-county titles
- Ulster titles: 1
- All-Irelands: 1
- All Stars: 0

Darragh Canavan (born 2000) is a Gaelic footballer who plays for Errigal Ciarán and the Tyrone county team. His father, Peter Canavan, is a former All-Ireland winning captain with Tyrone, and his brother Ruairí is also an inter-county footballer.

== Playing career ==
=== University ===
In his studies at Ulster University, Canavan established himself on their senior football team. Ulster faced UCD in the final of the Sigerson Cup on 14 February 2024. Canavan was man-of-the-match, scoring five points from play as Ulster won the competition for the first time in sixteen years. Canavan was later named on the Sigerson Cup team of the year.

=== Club ===
On 30 September 2018, Canavan made his Tyrone Senior Football Championship debut, scoring a point from the bench in a loss to Coalisland.

Errigal Ciarán reached the county final in 2019, facing Trillick on 13 October. Canavan didn't start the game through injury, coming on as a second-half sub. Trillick won the match by 0–12 to 2–4. It would be 2022 before Errigal Ciarán reached another county final, where they came up against Carrickmore on 30 October. Canavan scored three points in the 2–11 to 1–12 win. Canavan was named man of the match and also finished as the championship's top scorer.

Errigal Ciarán reached the county final again in 2023, facing Trillick once again. Canavan scored two points, but Trillick were three-point winners after extra-time. The two sides met in the county final for the second year in a row in 2024, with Canavan captaining Errigal Ciarán. Canavan scored two points and lifted the cup after a 0–12 to 1–8 win. Errigal went on to reach the final of the Ulster Senior Club Football Championship for the first time since 2002. In the final against Kilcoo, Canavan scored a point as Errigal Ciarán won the match by 1–8 to 0–10, and lifted the cup as captain.

=== Inter-county ===
==== Minor and under-20 ====
On 11 June 2017, Canavan was at centre forward for the Ulster under-17 final against Cavan. Canavan scored two points as Tyrone were comfortable winners. On 27 August, Tyrone faced Roscommon at Croke Park in the All-Ireland final. Canavan finished with a personal tally of 1–3, as Tyrone were nine-point winners.

On 14 July 2019, Canavan was at centre forward as the Tyrone under-20 team faced Derry in the Ulster final. Tyrone were 4–13 to 1–10 winners, Canavan finishing with two points. On 28 July, Canavan scored 1–1 as Tyrone lost the All-Ireland semi-final by two points to Cork. Canavan was named in the top 20 players in the under-20 championship at the end of the season.

Tyrone were back in the Ulster final in 2020, facing Donegal on 7 March. A goal from Canavan secured a 1–11 to 0–9 victory, and a second provincial title in a row. On 19 October, Canavan scored three points in the All-Ireland semi-final loss to Dublin. At the end of the season, Canavan was once again named in the top 20 players of the championship.

==== Senior ====
Canavan joined the Tyrone senior squad in late 2018. Canavan made his senior debut on 20 December, scoring a point in a Dr McKenna Cup win over Derry.

On 25 October 2020, Canavan made his National League debut, scoring 1–1 in a win over Mayo. Canavan made his championship debut on 1 November, scoring 1–1 in an Ulster quarter-final loss to Donegal.

On 12 June 2021, Canavan suffered a serious ankle injury in a National League match against Kerry. Canavan did not feature for Tyrone until the Ulster final against Monaghan on July 31. Canavan came on as a late substitute as Tyrone won their first provincial title in four years. On 28 August, Canavan was again used as a sub in the All-Ireland semi-final win over Kerry. On 11 September, Tyrone faced Mayo in the All-Ireland final. Canavan scored a point from the bench as Tyrone claimed their fourth All-Ireland crown. Canavan was nominated for the Young Footballer of the Year award at the end of the season.

In the 2023 championship, Tyrone faced Monaghan in the Ulster quarter-final. Canavan top-scored for Tyrone with 1–5, but Monaghan won the match with a last-minute goal. In the group stage of the All-Ireland, Canavan scored ten points against Westmeath as Tyrone advanced to the preliminary quarter-final. In the preliminary quarter-final against Donegal, Canavan scored five points. Kerry ended Tyrone's season at the quarter-final stage. At the end of the season, Canavan received his first All-Star nomination.

== Honours ==
Tyrone

- All-Ireland Senior Football Championship: 2021
- Ulster Senior Football Championship: 2021
- Ulster Under-20 Football Championship: 2019, 2020
- All-Ireland Under-17 Football Championship: 2017
- Ulster Under-17 Football Championship: 2017

Errigal Ciarán

- Ulster Senior Club Football Championship: 2024 (c)
- Tyrone Senior Football Championship: 2022, 2024 (c)

Ulster University

- Sigerson Cup: 2024

Individual

- Eirgrid 20 Under-20 Award: 2019, 2020
- GAA Higher Education Rising Stars Football Team: 2024
