= 2017 Dublin Senior Hurling Championship =

Annual hurling competition season

- 2017 Craobh Sinsear Peile; Bhaile Átha Cliath

Tournament details
- County: Dublin
- Year: 2017

Winners
- Champions: Cuala
- Manager: Mattie Kenny

The 2017 Dublin Senior Hurling Championship is the 130th staging of the Dublin Senior Hurling Championship since its establishment by the Dublin County Board in 1887. The championship began on 27 April 2017 and ended in October 2017. Cuala won their third title in a row.

Cuala were the defending champions defeating Kilmacud Crokes in the 2016 final.

== Group stage ==
=== Group A ===
Team	Pld	W	L	D	PF	PA	PD	Pts
Cuala	3	2	0	1	75	46	+29	4
Ballyboden St. Enda's	3	2	0	1	71	60	+11	4
Crumlin	3	2	0	1	64	74	-10	4
Faughs	3	0	0	3	45	75	-30	0

Round 1

4/27/17; 18:45	Crumlin	1-18 - 2-14	Faughs	O'Toole Park; Referee: Danny Harrington

4/29/17; 17:30	Ballyboden St. Enda's	1-18 - 0-17	Cuala	Parnell Park; Referee: Declan Moloney; Man of the Match: Simon Lambert
4/29/17; 17:30	Simon Lambert 0-7 (0-4f), Conal Keaney 1-1, Niall McMorrow 0-3, Conor Robinson, Paul Doherty, James Roche, Aidan Mellet, Eoghan O'Neill, Niall Ryan, David O'Connor 0-1 each	Report	David Treacy 0-12 (0-9f, 1 '65), Mark Schutte 0-2, Jake Malone, Nicky Kenny, Niall Keane 0-1 each	Parnell Park; Referee: Declan Moloney; Man of the Match: Simon Lambert

Round 2

5/3/17; 19:00	Cuala	1-23 - 0-10	Faughs	O'Toole Park; Referee: PJ Murray

5/5/17; 19:00	Crumlin	2-22 - 0-22	Ballyboden St. Enda's	O'Toole Park; Referee: Tony Lambe

Round 3

9/23/17; 16:45	Ballyboden St. Enda's	2-22 - 0-15	Faughs	O'Toole Park; Referee: Jason Buckley

9/23/17; 16:45	Cuala	3-23 - 1-12	Crumlin	Parnell Park; Referee: Thomas Gleeson
9/23/17; 16:45	David Treacy 0-9 (0-5f), Mark Schutte 1-3, Nicky Kenny 0-5, Colm Cronin 1-1, Con O'Callaghan 1-0, Jake Malone 0-2, Colum Sheanon and Cian Waldron 0-1 each	Report	Alex Quinn 0-6, Adam McGreal 1-2 (0-2f), Peter Elliot 0-2f, Craig Gough and Shane Ryan 0-1 each	Parnell Park; Referee: Thomas Gleeson

=== Group B ===
Team	Pld	W	L	D	PF	PA	PD	Pts
Lucan Sarsfields	3	2	0	1	53	29	+24	4
St. Brigid's	3	2	0	1	66	51	+15	4
Naomh Fionnbarra	3	2	0	1	52	58	-6	4
Ballinteer St Johns	3	0	0	3	42	75	-33	0

Round 1

4/27/17; 20:15	Lucan Sarsfields	0-21 - 0-7	St. Brigid's	Parnell Park; Referee: Thomas Gleeson
4/27/17; 20:15	Kevin O'Reilly 0-12 (0-8f), Ciaran Dowling 0-3, Adrian Phelan and Sean McClelland 0-2 each, Kevin Fitzgerald and Paul Rigney 0-1 each		Paul Winters 0-5f, Daire Plunkett and Eoghan Dunne 0-1 each	Parnell Park; Referee: Thomas Gleeson

4/28/17; 18:45	Naomh Fionnbarra	2-17 - 1-16	Ballinteer St Johns	O'Toole Park; Referee: Karl O'Brien
4/28/17; 18:45	Eamonn Dillon 1-10 (0-6f, 1 '65) and Ryan Curley 1-0		Aodhan Clabby 0-9 (0-4f, 1 sl) and Rob Aherne 1-0	O'Toole Park; Referee: Karl O'Brien

Round 2

5/4/17; 19:00	St. Brigid's	3-20 - 0-11	Ballinteer St. Johns	O'Toole Park; Referee: Tony Lambe
5/4/17; 19:00	Paul Winters 0-8 (0-5f), Johnny McGuirk, Aodhan McInerney, Ciaran Kellett 1-0 each		Glenn Whelan 0-5	O'Toole Park; Referee: Tony Lambe

5/5/17; 19:00	Naomh Fionnbarra	0-10 - 0-9	Lucan Sarsfields	Parnell Park; Referee: Sean McCarthy
5/5/17; 19:00		Report		Parnell Park; Referee: Sean McCarthy

Round 3

9/23/17; 15:15	St. Brigid's	1-27 - 2-13	Naomh Fionnbarra	Parnell Park; Referee: Finbar Gaffney
9/23/17; 15:15	Paul Winters 0-17 (0-10f, 1 '65), Cian O'Sullivan 0-4, John O'Loughlin 1-1, Aodhan McInerney and Daire Plunkett 0-2 each, Brendan McInerney 0-1	Report	Eamonn Dillon 0-8 (0-6f), DJ Smithers 1-1, Tony Costello 1-0, Ryan Curley 0-2, Patrick Whelan and Glen Godrill 0-1 each	Parnell Park; Referee: Finbar Gaffney

9/23/17; 15:15	Lucan Sarsfields	0-23 - 0-12	Ballinteer St. Johns	O'Toole Park; Referee: Donal Ryan

=== Group C ===
Team	Pld	W	L	D	PF	PA	PD	Pts
Kilmacud Crokes	3	3	0	0	81	53	+28	6
St Vincents	3	2	0	1	96	53	+43	4
St Jude's	3	1	0	2	56	74	-18	2
Setanta	3	0	0	3	49	102	-53	0

Round 1

4/27/17; 18:45	St Vincents	4-21 - 0-15	St Jude's	Parnell Park; Referee: Robert Fennelly
4/27/17; 18:45	John Hetherton 1-5 (0-4f, 1 '65), Rian McBride 1-3, Cian McBride 0-5, Alan Moore 0-4, Ro Fallon 1-1, Keith Connolly 1-0, Tom Connolly 0-2, Diarmuid Connolly 0-1		Leo Sexton, Ronan Joyce, Colm O'Callaghan (0-2f), Fionn Ó Riain Broin, Paul Maguire (0-2f), Canice Maher, Joey McManus, Mark Maguire, John Ryan 0-1 each	Parnell Park; Referee: Robert Fennelly

4/29/17; 17:30	Kilmacud Crokes	5-20 - 2-10	Setanta	O'Toole Park; Referee: Peter Smyth
4/29/17; 17:30	Barry O'Rourke 2-3, Oisin O'Rourke 0-9 (0-4f), Ryan O'Dwyer and Ronan Hayes 1-0 each		Cian Fallon 1-0	O'Toole Park; Referee: Peter Smyth

Round 2

5/3/17; 20:15	St Vincents	6-26 - 2-9	Setanta	Parnell Park; Referee: Terry Carton
5/3/17; 20:15	John Hetherton 2-11 (0-7f), Alan Moore 2-3, Rian McBride and Ro Fallon 1-0 each			Parnell Park; Referee: Terry Carton

5/4/17; 20:15	Kilmacud Crokes	2-17 - 2-12	St Jude's	Parnell Park; Referee: Michael Moylan
5/4/17; 20:15		Report		Parnell Park; Referee: Michael Moylan

Round 3

9/24/17; 14:30	St Jude's	1-20 - 3-9	Setanta	O'Toole Park; Referee: Chris Mooney

9/24/17; 14:30	Kilmacud Crokes	0-23 - 2-13	St Vincents	Parnell Park; Referee: Declan Moloney
9/24/17; 14:30	Fergal Whitely 0-8, Oisin O'Rourke 0-6 (0-5f), Caolan Conway 0-3, Sean McGrath 0-2, Lorcan McMullen, Cian MacGabhann (0-1f), Robert Murphy, Alex Considine 0-1 each		Graeme Giblin 1-4, John Hetherton 0-5f, Keith Connolly 1-0, Alan Moore 0-3	Parnell Park; Referee: Declan Moloney

=== Group D ===
Team	Pld	W	L	D	PF	PA	PD	Pts
Craobh Chiaráin	3	3	0	0	71	38	+33	6
Na Fianna	3	2	0	1	69	41	+28	4
O'Toole's	3	1	0	2	54	52	+2	2
Naomh Barróg	3	0	0	3	30	93	-63	0

Round 1

4/29/17; 16:00	O'Toole's	3-22 - 0-11	Naomh Barróg	Parnell Park; Referee: Anton Keating
4/29/17; 16:00	Niall Arthur 2-12 (0-7f), Peadar Carton 1-0, Ger O'Meara 0-1		Donnacha Butler 0-2, Ciaran Gallagher 0-1	Parnell Park; Referee: Anton Keating

4/29/17; 16:00	Craobh Chiaráin	1-18 - 0-16	Na Fianna	O'Toole Park; Referee: Sean Stack

Round 2

5/3/17; 18:45	Craobh Chiaráin	2-15 - 0-10	Naomh Barróg	Parnell Park; Referee: Sean Stack

5/4/17; 18:45	Na Fianna	0-12 - 0-11	O'Toole's	Parnell Park; Referee: Joe Lyons
5/4/17; 18:45	Colin Currie 0-6f, Andrew Jamieson-Murphy 0-2 (1 sl), Jonathan Treacy (0-1f), Feargal Breathnach, Donal Burke, Conor McHugh 0-1 each	Report	Niall Arthur 0-6f, Ger Arthur 0-2, Brendan McLaughlin (0-1f), Michael Carton, Cian Wilson 0-1 each	Parnell Park; Referee: Joe Lyons

Round 3

9/24/17; 16:00	Na Fianna	4-29 - 0-9	Naomh Barróg	O'Toole Park; Referee: Sean McCarthy
9/24/17; 16:00	Colin Currie 2-13 (0-9f, 2 '65), Gavin King 0-5 (1 sl), Paul O'Dea and Conor McHugh 1-0 each, Eoghan McHugh and Donal Burke (0-3f) 0-3 each, Ciaran Fanning 0-2, Padraig Buggy, Fergal Breathnach, Sean Murphy 0-1 each	Report		O'Toole Park; Referee: Sean McCarthy

9/24/17; 16:00	Craobh Chiaráin	3-20 - 0-12	O'Toole's	Parnell Park; Referee: Sean Stack
9/24/17; 16:00	Alan McCrabbe 1-10 (0-6f), Paul Kelly 2-1, Robbie Mahon 0-4 (0-2f), Conor Ryan 0-2, Stephen Kelly, Mark McGuirk, Peter O'Boyle 0-1 each	Report	Niall Arthur 0-6 (0-4f), Michael Carton and Michael Cunningham 0-2 each, Ger Arthur and Cathal Kenny 0-1 each	Parnell Park; Referee: Sean Stack

== Quarter-finals ==
8 October 2017; 2:15 pm	Lucan Sarsfields	2-12 - 0-16	Ballyboden St. Enda's	O'Toole Park; Referee: Anton Keating (Setanta)
8 October 2017; 2:15 pm	Tommy Sommers 0-5 (0-4f, 1 '65), Matthew McCaffrey and CJ Smith 1-0 each, John McCaffrey and Chris Crummey 0-2, Ciaran Dowling, Kevin Fitzgerald, Kevin O'Reilly (0-1f) 0-1 each		Conor Dooley 0-5 (0-4f), Paul Ryan 0-4 (0-3f), Niall McMorrow 0-2, David O'Connor, Conal Keaney, Aidan Mellet, Niall Ryan, Shane Roche 0-1 each	O'Toole Park; Referee: Anton Keating (Setanta)

8 October 2017; 4:00 pm	Cuala	3-14 - 2-15	St. Brigid's	O'Toole Park; Referee: Donal Ryan (St. Patrick's Palmerstown)
8 October 2017; 4:00 pm	David Treacy 0-9 (0-4f, 2 '65), Con O'Callaghan 2-0, Sean Treacy 1-0, Sean Moran, Jake Malone, Nicky Kenny, Darragh O'Connell, Mark Schutte 0-1 each		Cian O'Sullivan 1-9 (0-6f, 1 '65), Eoghan Dunne 1-0, Johnny McGuirk 0-2, Paul Winters (0-1f), John O'Loughlin, Aodhan McInerney, Daire Plunkett 0-1 each	O'Toole Park; Referee: Donal Ryan (St. Patrick's Palmerstown)

8 October 2017; 2:15 pm	Kilmacud Crokes	0-17 - 0-15	Na Fianna	Parnell Park; Referee: Dave Aston (Naomh Mearnog)
8 October 2017; 2:15 pm	Oisin O'Rourke 0-6 (0-5f), Fergal Whitely 0-3, Caolan Conway and Ronan Hayes 0-2 each, Damien Kelly, Barry O'Rourke, Sean McGrath, Alex Considine 0-1 each		Colin Currie 0-9 (0-8f), Sean Ryan and Donal Burke 0-2, Gavin King and Tomas Watters 0-1 each	Parnell Park; Referee: Dave Aston (Naomh Mearnog)

8 October 2017; 4:00 pm	St. Vincents	2-14 - 1-10	Craobh Chiaráin	Parnell Park; Referee: Chris Mooney (St. Patrick's Palmerstown)
8 October 2017; 4:00 pm	Cian McBride and Conor Burke 1-1 each, Diarmuid Connolly and Keith Connolly 0-3 each, Tomas Connolly, Rian McBride (0-1f), Graeme Giblin, John Hetherton (0-1f), Cathal Billings, Ro Fallon 0-1 each		Alan McCrabbe 0-7 (0-6f), Paul Kelly 1-2, Conor Ryan 0-1	Parnell Park; Referee: Chris Mooney (St. Patrick's Palmerstown)

== Semi-finals ==
22 October 2017; 2:00 pm	Kilmacud Crokes	1-13 - 0-13	Lucan Sarsfields	Parnell Park; Referee: Sean Stack (Parnells)
22 October 2017; 2:00 pm	Ross O'Carroll 1-2, Oisin O'Rorke 0-4f, Cian MacGabhann 0-3f, Fergal Whitely, Caolan Conway, Barry O'Rorke, Sean McGrath 0-1 each	Report	Tommy Sommers 0-4f, Kevin O'Reilly 0-3 (0-2f, 1 '65), Paul Crummey 0-2, John McCaffrey, Matthew McCaffrey, Peter Kelly, Kevin Fitzgerald 0-1 each	Parnell Park; Referee: Sean Stack (Parnells)

22 October 2017; 3:45 pm	Cuala	4-16 - 2-16	St. Vincents	Parnell Park; Referee: Terry Carton (Naomh Fionnbarra)
22 October 2017; 3:45 pm	David Treacy 0-11 (0-10f), Colm Cronin 2-1, Jake Malone and Con O'Callaghan 1-1 each, Mark Schutte and Shane Stapleton 0-1 each	Report	John Hetherton 1-9 (0-7f, 1 '65, 1 sl), Rian McBride 1-0, Diarmuid Connolly 0-2, Cian McBride, Alan Moore, Conor Burke, Keith Connolly, Ro Fallon 0-1 each	Parnell Park; Referee: Terry Carton (Naomh Fionnbarra)

== Final ==
28 October 2017; 3:30 pm	Cuala	1-13 - 0-13	Kilmacud Crokes	Parnell Park; Attendance: 3,000; Referee: Finbar Gaffney (Na Fianna)
28 October 2017; 3:30 pm	David Treacy 0-6 (0-4f, 1 '65), Darragh O'Connell 1-0, Con O'Callaghan 0-3, Colm Cronin 0-2, Colum Sheanon and Mark Schutte 0-1 each	Report	Oisin O'Rorke 0-7 (0-5f), Fergal Whitely 0-3, Ross O'Carroll, Lorcan McMullan, Sean McGrath 0-1 each	Parnell Park; Attendance: 3,000; Referee: Finbar Gaffney (Na Fianna)
