= 2024–25 All-Ireland Senior Club Football Championship =

Gaelic football competition

- Dates: 2 November 2024 – 19 January 2025
- Teams: 32
- Sponsor: Allied Irish Bank
- Champions: Cuala; James Power, Luke Keating (captain); Austin O'Malley (manager)
- Runners-up: Errigal Ciarán; Darragh Canavan (captain); Enda McGinley (manager)

Tournament statistics
- Matches played: 31
- Goals scored: 56 (1.81 per match)
- Points scored: 695 (22.42 per match)

Provincial Champions
- Connacht: Coolera–Strandhill
- Leinster: Cuala
- Munster: Dr Crokes
- Ulster: Errigal Ciarán

The 2024–25 All-Ireland Senior Club Football Championship was the 54th staging of the All-Ireland Senior Club Football Championship, the Gaelic Athletic Association's premier inter-county club Gaelic football tournament. The competition ran from November 2024 to January 2025.

The defending champion was Glen; however, that club lost the Derry SFC final.

The final was played on 19 January 2025 at Croke Park in Dublin, between Cuala and Errigal Ciarán, in what was their first ever championship meeting. Cuala won the match by 3–14 to 1–16 to claim a first title.

== Format ==
Each Irish county plays a county championship, with one club from each county progressing to the All-Ireland Senior Club Football Championship. In this, each province plays their own championship (all being straight knockout) with the four provincial champions qualifying for the All-Ireland semi-finals.

The Kilkenny champion did not compete in Leinster, instead playing in the 2024–25 All-Ireland Intermediate Club Football Championship, while the London champion competed in the Connacht Club SFC.

== Teams ==
Team	County	Captain(s)	Manager(s)	Most recent success		
Team	County	Captain(s)	Manager(s)	All-Ireland	Provincial	County
Abbeylara	Longford	Robbie Smyth; Cian Brady	Frankie Dolan			2006
Adare	Limerick					2020
Ballina Stephenites	Mayo	Sam Callinan; David Clarke	Niall Heffernan	2005	2007	2023
Castlehaven	Cork	Mark Collins	Seanie Cahalane		2023	2023
Castletown Liam Mellows	Wexford	Liam Coleman; Colin Kennedy	Jimmy Fogarty			2022
Clann Éireann	Armagh	Conor McConville	Ruairi Lavery			2022
Coolera–Strandhill	Sligo					2023
Corofin	Galway	Dylan McHugh	Kevin Johnson	2020	2019	2023
Crosserlough	Cavan	Peter Smith	Ryan Daly			2020
Cuala	Dublin	Luke Keating; James Power	Austin O'Malley			
Dr Crokes	Kerry	David Naughten	Pat O'Shea	2017	2018	2018
Dunshaughlin	Meath	Niall Murphy; Jarad Rushe	Richie Kealy		2002	2002
Éire Óg	Clare	Aaron Fitzgerald	Paul Madden			2022
Erin's Own, Cargin	Antrim	James Laverty	Ronan Devlin			2023
Erne Gaels	Fermanagh	Ryan Lyons	Declan Bonner			1981
Errigal Ciarán	Tyrone	Darragh Canavan	Enda McGinley		2002	2022
Kilcoo	Down	Darry Branagan; Aaron Morgan	Karl Lacey	2022	2021	2023
Loughmore–Castleiney	Tipperary	Liam Treacy	Shane Hennessy			2021
Mohill	Leitrim	Shane Quinn	Eamonn O'Hara			2023
Naas	Kildare	Eoin Doyle	Joe Murphy			2023
Newbridge	Derry	Conor McAteer	Kevin Brady; Gary Hetherington			1989
North London Shamrocks	London	Michael Miller	Peter Witherow			
Pádraig Pearses	Roscommon	Niall Daly	Frank Canning		2021	2021
Portarlington	Laois	Ronan Coffey	Pat Roe			2022
Rathgormack	Waterford	Willie Hahessy	Kenny Hassett			2023
Rathvilly	Carlow	Josh Moore	Kevin Byrne; JJ Smith			2021
Scotstown	Monaghan	Shane Carey	David McCague		1989	2023
St Eunan's	Donegal	Kieran Tobin	Barry Meehan			2021
St Loman's	Westmeath	John Heslin	Paddy Dowdall			2023
St Mary's	Louth	Liam Jackson; Robbie Leavy	Cathal Murray			2023
Tinahely	Wicklow	Michael Byrne	Martin Ging			1984
Tullamore	Offaly	Declan Hogan	Niall Stack			2023

== Connacht ==
Quarter-finals
North London Shamrocks (London)	0-09
Ballina Stephenites (Mayo)	0-15
Corofin (Galway)	0-10
Pádraig Pearses (Roscommon)	2-10

Semi-finals
Ballina Stephenites (Mayo)	0-09 (4)
Coolera–Strandhill (Sligo)	0-09 (5) (pens.)
Pádraig Pearses (Roscommon)	0-13
Mohill (Leitrim)	0-03

Final
Coolera–Strandhill (Sligo)	1-15
Pádraig Pearses (Roscommon)	1-14

=== Quarter-finals ===
9 November 2024 Quarter-final	North London Shamrocks (London)	0-09 (9) – (15) 0-15	Ballina Stephenites (Mayo)	Ruislip
13:30 GMT (UTC±0)		Report		Stadium: McGovern Park

10 November 2024 Quarter-final	Corofin (Galway)	0-10 (10) – (16) 2-10	Pádraig Pearses (Roscommon)	Tuam
13:30 IWT (UTC±0)		Report		Stadium: St Jarlath's Park

=== Semi-finals ===
17 November 2024 Semi-final	Coolera–Strandhill (Sligo)	0-09 (9) – (9) 0-09 (a.e.t.) (5–4 p)	Ballina Stephenites (Mayo)	Sligo
13:30 IWT (UTC±0)	N Murphy 0-6 (4fs); M McDaniel, R Doherty, B O’Mahony 0-1 each	Report	L Doherty, E Regan (1f) 0-2 each; F Irwin (f), N Feeney, L Feeney, C Treacy, D Thornton 0-1 each	Stadium: Markievicz Park; Referee: Paddy Neilan (Roscommon)

17 November 2024 Semi-final	Mohill (Leitrim)	0-03 (3) – (13) 0-13	Pádraig Pearses (Roscommon)	Ballinamore
13:30 IWT (UTC±0)	K Beirne (0-2fs); E Harkin (0-1)	Report	R Daly (0-4); C Daly (0-3), D Kenny, J Tumulty (0-2 each); P Carey, C Ryan (0-1 each)	Stadium: Seán O'Heslin's; Referee: J Molloy (Galway)

=== Final ===
1 December 2024 Final	Coolera–Strandhill (Sligo)	1-15 (18) – (17) 1-14 (a.e.t.)	Pádraig Pearses (Roscommon)	Sligo
13:15 IWT (UTC±0)				Stadium: Markievicz Park

== Leinster ==
First round
Dunshaughlin (Meath)	2-04
St Loman's (Westmeath)	2-17
St Mary's (Louth)	3-14
Abbeylara (Longford)	2-08
Portarlington (Laois)	0-10
Tinahely (Wicklow)	2-05

Quarter-finals
St Loman's (Westmeath)	3-11
Castletown (Wexford)	0-07
St Mary's (Louth)	2-09
Rathvilly (Carlow)	0-08
Naas (Kildare)	1-15
Cuala (Dublin)	2-15
Tinahely (Wicklow)	1-07
Tullamore (Offaly)	2-10

Semi-finals
St Loman's (Westmeath)	0-14
St Mary's (Louth)	0-15
Cuala (Dublin)	1-10
Tullamore (Offaly)	0-10

Final
St Mary's (Louth)	2-10
Cuala (Dublin)	1-14

=== First round ===
3 November 2024 Round 1	Dunshaughlin (Meath)	2-04 (10) – (23) 2-17	St Loman's (Westmeath)	Navan
13:30 IWT (UTC±0)	Aaron Murphy 1-1, Jared Rushe 1-0, Ciaran McCarrick 0-2, Mathew Costello 0-1 (1f)	Report	Danny McCartan 1-3, Fola Ayorinde 1-2, John Heslin 0-5 (2f, 1m), Sam McCartan 0-3 (1 45), Sean Flanagan 0-2, Jack Geoghegan 0-1, Ronan O'Toole 0-1	Stadium: Páirc Tailteann; Referee: Anthony Nolan (Wicklow)

3 November 2024 Round 1	St Mary's (Louth)	3-14 (23) – (14) 2-08	Abbeylara (Longford)	Ardee
13:45 IWT (UTC±0)	K Moran 0-4, T Jackson 1-1, L Jackson 1-1, C Gillespie 0-3 (3fs), K Faulkner 1-0, R Carroll 0-2, D McKenny 0-1, T McDonnell 0-1	Report	R Smyth 0-5 (3fs), C Scanlon 1-1 (f), C Gilligan 1-0, J Kelly 0-1, C Berry 0-1	Stadium: Páirc Mhuire; Referee: B Cawley (Kildare)

3 November 2024 Round 1	Portarlington (Laois)	0-10 (10) – (11) 2-05	Tinahely (Wicklow)	Portlaoise
14:30 IWT (UTC±0)	Jake Foster 0-3 (1f), Ronan Coffey 0-3 (3f), Alex Mohan 0-1, Jason Moore 0-1, Darragh Galvin 0-1 (1m), Rioghan Murphy 0-1	Report	Matthew Ging 1-3, Eoin Darcy 1-1 (1f), Paddy O’Rourke 0-1	Stadium: O'Moore Park; Referee: Fergal Kelly (Longford)

=== Quarter-finals ===
9 November 2024 Quarter-final	Naas (Kildare)	1-15 (18) – (21) 2-15	Cuala (Dublin)	Newbridge
19:15 IWT (UTC±0)	Alex Beirne (1-03, 0-02f); Tom Browne (0-02); Paddy McDermott (0-03); Ryan Sinkey (0-01); Darragh Kirwan (0-05); Sean Hanafin (0-01)	Report	Ryan Scollard (0-01, 0-01 45); David O'Dowd (0-02); Niall O'Callaghan (1-05); Luke Keating (1-01, 0-01f); Con O'Callaghan (0-03, 0-02f); Conor Groake (0-03)	Stadium: St Conleth's Park; Referee: David Coldrick (Meath); Man of the Match: Niall O'Callaghan

10 November 2024 Quarter-final	St Mary's (Louth)	2-09 (15) – (8) 0-08	Rathvilly (Carlow)	Ardee
13:30 IWT (UTC±0)				Stadium: Páirc Mhuire

10 November 2024 Quarter-final	Tinahely (Wicklow)	1-07 (10) – (16) 2-10	Tullamore (Offaly)	Aughrim
13:30 IWT (UTC±0)				Stadium: Aughrim County Ground

17 November 2024 Quarter-final	St Loman's (Westmeath)	3-11 (20) – (7) 0-07	Castletown Liam Mellows (Wexford)	Mullingar
19:30 IWT (UTC±0)		Report		Stadium: Lakepoint Park

=== Semi-finals ===
23 November 2024 Semi-final	St Loman's (Westmeath)	0-14 (14) – (15) 0-15	St Mary's (Louth)	Mullingar
13:30 IWT (UTC±0)				Stadium: TEG Cusack Park

23 November 2024 Semi-final	Cuala (Dublin)	1-10 (13) – (10) 0-10	Tullamore (Offaly)	Donnycarney
19:15 IWT (UTC±0)	Charlie McMorrow (0-01); Michael Fitzsimons (0-01); Peter Duffy (1-01); Niall O'Callaghan (0-01); Cillian Dunne (0-01); Luke Keating (0-01); Con O'Callaghan (0-04, 0-01f)	Report	John Furlong (0-01); Nigel Bracken (0-01); Michael Brazil (0-01, 0-01f); Niall Furlong (0-01); Harry Plunkett (0-06, 0-05f)	Stadium: Parnell Park; Referee: Anthony Nolan (Wicklow); Man of the Match: Con O'Callaghan

=== Final ===
30 November 2024 Final	St Mary's (Louth)	2-10 (16) – (17) 1-14	Cuala (Dublin)	Dublin
17:45 IWT (UTC±0)	Tiernan Markey (0-01, 0-01f); Tadhg McDonnell (0-01); Jonathan Commins (0-02, 0-01f); Sean Callaghan (1-00); Ciaran Keenan (0-03, 0-03f); Daire McConnon (0-01); Ryan Rooney (1-02)	Report	Charlie McMorrow (0-01); Eoin Kennedy (0-01); Michael Fitzsimons (0-01); Niall O'Callaghan (0-02); Cal Doran (0-01); Luke Keating (0-03, 0-02f); Con O'Callaghan (0-04, 0-02f); Conor O'Brien (1-01)	Stadium: Croke Park; Referee: Seamus Mulhare (Laois); Man of the Match: Con O'Callaghan

== Munster ==
Quarter-finals
Éire Óg, Ennis (Clare)	2-08
Adare (Limerick)	0-09
Dr Crokes (Kerry)	1-15
Castlehaven (Cork)	1-08

Semi-finals
Éire Óg, Ennis (Clare)	2-07
Loughmore–Castleiney (Tipperary)	3-09
Dr Crokes (Kerry)	0-09
Rathgormack (Waterford)	0-08

Final
Loughmore–Castleiney (Tipperary)	1-06
Dr Crokes (Kerry)	0-15

=== Quarter-finals ===
10 November 2024 Quarter-final	Éire Óg, Ennis (Clare)	2-08 (14) – (12) 1-09	Adare (Limerick)	Ennis
13:15 IWT (UTC±0)				Stadium: Cusack Park

10 November 2024 Quarter-final	Dr Crokes (Kerry)	1-15 (18) – (11) 1-08	Castlehaven (Cork)	Killarney
13:15 IWT (UTC±0)	T Brosnan 1-7 (1-0p, 0-3f), M Burns 0-2 (1f), K O'Leary 0-2, M Lynch, C Keating, M Potts, C McMahon 0-1 each	Report	D Cahalane 1-0 (p), B Hurley 0-3 (2f), T O'Mahony, J O'Neill, A Whelton, C Maguire, C Cahalane 1 each	Stadium: Lewis Road; Referee: Sean Lonergan (Tipperary)

=== Semi-finals ===
24 November 2024 Semi-final	Éire Óg, Ennis (Clare)	2-07 (13) – (18) 3-09	Loughmore–Castleiney (Tipperary)	Ennis
13:00 IWT (UTC±0)				Stadium: Cusack Park; Referee: Brendan Griffin (Kerry)

24 November 2024 Semi-final	Rathgormack (Waterford)	0-08 (8) – (9) 0-09	Dr Crokes (Kerry)	Dungarvan
13:00 WET (UTC+0)	J Curry 3 (1f), J Power 2, J Gleeson 1(1f), C Murray, A Murray 1 each	Report	T Brosnan 4 (4fs), M Burns 4 (1f), M Lynch 1	Stadium: Fraher Field; Referee: Niall Quinn (Clare)

=== Final ===
8 December 2024 Final	Loughmore–Castleiney (Tipperary)	1-06 (9) – (15) 0-15	Dr Crokes (Kerry)	Mallow
13:30 WET (UTC+0)	P O'Connell 1-0, L McGrath 0-2 (2fs), L Treacy 0-2, A McGrath 0-1	Report	M Burns 0-5 (2fs), T Brosnan 0-5, T Doyle, K O'Leary 0-2 each, B Looney 0-1	Referee: Conor Lane (Cork)

== Ulster ==
Preliminary round
Errigal Ciarán (Tyrone)	0-12
St Eunan's (Donegal)	0-10

Quarter-finals
Erne Gaels (Fermanagh)	0-06
Scotstown (Monaghan)	0-19
Kilcoo (Down)	0-15
Crosserlough (Cavan)	1-10
Newbridge (Derry)	0-12
Clann Éireann (Armagh)	0-14
Erin's Own, Cargin (Antrim)	0-09
Errigal Ciarán (Tyrone)	0-17

Semi-finals
Scotstown (Monaghan)	0-14
Kilcoo (Down)	5-10
Clann Éireann (Armagh)	1-10
Errigal Ciarán (Tyrone)	0-14

Final
Kilcoo (Down)	0-10
Errigal Ciarán (Tyrone)	1-08

=== Preliminary round ===
2 November 2024 Preliminary round	Errigal Ciarán (Tyrone)	0-12 (12) – (10) 0-10	St Eunan's (Donegal)	Omagh
19:15 IWT (UTC±0)	Ruairí Canavan 0-3 (1f) (1 45), Ben McDonnell 0-3, Peter Harte 0-2, Odhran Robinson 0-1, Mark Kavanagh 0-1, Peter Óg McCartan 0-1, Thomas Canavan 0-1	Report	Shane O’Donnell 0-4, Conor O’Donnell Jnr 0-3 (2f) (1 45), Conor O’Donnell Snr 0-1, James Kelly 0-1, Niall O’Donnell 0-1	Stadium: Healy Park; Referee: Noel Mooney (Cavan)

=== Quarter-finals ===
9 November 2024 Quarter-final	Kilcoo (Down)	0-15 (15) – (13) 1-10	Crosserlough (Cavan)	Newry
18:00 IWT (UTC±0)		Report		Stadium: Páirc Esler; Referee: Barry Cassidy (Derry)

10 November 2024 Quarter-final	Erin's Own, Cargin (Antrim)	0-09 (9) – (17) 0-17	Errigal Ciarán (Tyrone)	Belfast
13:00 IWT (UTC±0)				Stadium: Corrigan Park

10 November 2024 Quarter-final	Newbridge (Derry)	0-12 (12) – (14) 0-14	Clann Éireann (Armagh)	Derry
15:30 IWT (UTC±0)				Stadium: Celtic Park

16 November 2024 Quarter-final	Erne Gaels (Fermanagh)	0-06 (6) – (19) 0-19	Scotstown (Monaghan)	Enniskillen
17:00 IWT (UTC±0)				Stadium: Brewster Park

=== Semi-finals ===
23 November 2024 Semi-final	Scotstown (Monaghan)	0-14 (14) – (25) 5-10	Kilcoo (Down)	Armagh
18:00 IWT (UTC±0)				Stadium: BOX-IT Athletic Grounds

24 November 2024 Semi-final	Clann Éireann (Armagh)	1-10 (13) – (14) 0-14	Errigal Ciarán (Tyrone)	Newry
15:15 IWT (UTC±0)				Stadium: Páirc Esler

=== Final ===
8 December 2024 Final	Kilcoo (Down)	0-10 (10) – (11) 1-08	Errigal Ciarán (Tyrone)	Armagh
15:30 GMT (UTC±0)				Stadium: BOX-IT Athletic Grounds

== Semi-finals ==
11 January 2025 Semi-final	Dr Crokes (Kerry)	1-18 (21) – (24) 2-18 (a.e.t.)	Errigal Ciarán (Tyrone)	Newbridge
15:00 IWT (UTC±0)				Stadium: St Conleth's Park; Referee: Brendan Cawley (Kildare)

11 January 2025 Semi-final	Coolera–Strandhill (Sligo)	0-09 (9) – (14) 0-14	Cuala (Dublin)	Cavan
17:00 IWT (UTC±0)	Keelan Harte (0-01); Sean Taylor (0-01); Peter Laffey (0-01); Ross Doherty (0-01); Mark McDaniel (0-02, 0-01m); Niall Murphy (0-02); Adam Higgins (0-01)	Report	David O'Dowd (0-01); Peadar Ó Cofaigh Byrne (0-01); Peter Duffy (0-01); Cillian Dunne (0-01); Cal Doran (0-02); Niall O'Callaghan (0-03); Con O'Callaghan (0-05, 0-03f)	Stadium: Kingspan Breffni; Referee: Niall Cullen (Fermanagh); Man of the Match: Con O'Callaghan

== Final ==
19 January 2025 Final	Cuala (Dublin)	3-14 (23) – (19) 1-16	Errigal Ciarán (Tyrone)	Dublin
15:40 IWT (UTC±0)	David O'Dowd (1-1); Peader Ó Cofaigh Byrne (1-1); Peter Duffy (0-1); Cal Doran (1-0); Luke Keating (0-3); Niall O'Callaghan (0-2); Con O'Callaghan (0-5, 0-2f, 0-1 ’45); Conor Groarke (0-1)	Report	Joe Oguz (0-1); Peter Harte (1-2); Thomas Canavan 0-6 (4f); Ciaran McGinley (0-1); Odhran Robinson (0-1); Ruairi Canavan (0-3); Mark Kavanagh (0-1); Padraig McGirr (0-1)	Stadium: Croke Park; Referee: Paddy Neilan (Roscommon); Man of the Match: Peader O'Cofaigh Byrne

== Bracket ==
Semi-finals		Final
Coolera–Strandhill (Sligo)	0–9
Cuala (Dublin)	0–14	Cuala (Dublin)	3–14
Dr Crokes (Kerry)	1–18	Errigal Ciarán (Tyrone)	1–16
Errigal Ciarán (Tyrone)	2–18

== Awards ==
Team of the Year

1. Keelan Harte (Coolera–Strandhill)
2. Seán Taylor (Coolera–Strandhill)
3. Michael Fitzsimons (Cuala)
4. Charlie McMorrow (Cuala)
5. Peter Óg McCartan (Errigal Ciarán)
6. Brian Looney (Dr Crokes)
7. David O'Dowd (Cuala)
8. Peadar Ó Cofaigh Byrne (Cuala)
9. Joe Oguz (Errigal Ciarán)
10. Micheál Burns (Dr Crokes)
11. Peter Harte (Errigal Ciarán)
12. Ruairí Canavan (Errigal Ciarán)
13. Niall O'Callaghan (Cuala)
14. Con O'Callaghan (Cuala)
15. Darragh Canavan (Errigal Ciarán)

Footballer of the Year

- Con O'Callaghan (Cuala)

Also nominated: Micheál Burns (Dr Crokes) & Ruairí Canavan (Errigal Ciarán)

== See also ==
- 2024–25 All-Ireland Senior Club Hurling Championship
