= Naomh Fionnbarra GAA =

Gaelic games club in County Dublin, Ireland

Naomh Fionnbarra
- Founded: 1945
- County: Dublin
- Nickname: The barrs
- Colours: Blue and white
- Grounds: Fassaugh Avenue, Cabra

Playing kits
Standard colours

Naomh Fionnbarra GAA is a Gaelic Athletic Association club in based in Cabra, in the north city area of Dublin. The club was founded in 1945 and has football, hurling and camogie teams. In 2020, the Senior football and hurling team won back to back football and hurling championships in the same year for the first time in their history. In 2024, the senior football team won the football league and were promoted.

== History ==
Naomh Fionnbarra Hurling Football Camogie club was founded in Cabra in 1945. The club started by running Roads League for juveniles, and later, they entered the Dublin Juvenile Leagues. The club was the first in Dublin to run road leagues, which are still being run today.

During the 1940s, members used to sell raffle tickets around the doors for firewood to raise money for the young club. St Finbarr's School has played a role in the supply of players for the club since 1943, when the school teams became the first primary school to win the hurling and football in the same year. The club won its first trophies in 1947, in an under-15 hurling league and an under-16 football league.

The club won the junior D league in 1952, the junior C League Smith Cup in 1953, and the Miller Shield in 1954. In 1958, the club won the B league in hurling. The same year, the club started a camogie section. They won an Intermediate Championship in 1958. In the late 1950s, the club received permission to start selling programmes in Croke Park in order to raise funds for the club.

In 1961, a development committee was established to gain the club its own clubhouse. The club was offered a piece of land behind the church on Killkearnan Road, but did not have the necessary funds to develop. While, in the early 1960s, the club was considered to be more focused on hurling than football, the junior footballers won the Junior Championship and Junior A League in 1961. The team also won a football championship in 1962 and the camogie section lasted up until 1968.

The team beat St Vincent in Parnell Park. This was the start of what would be called the "Golden Decade" as the club won a number of championships and leagues to go both senior hurling and football in a 12-year period.

In 1965, the junior hurlers won the junior hurling league and championship. In 1966, the football team progressed to the senior ranks by winning the inter-football championship. In 1969, the club won the double in inter-championship and league.

The hurlers won the senior hurling league in 1970 and 1971. In 1974, the club committee approached the city council to build a clubhouse on the site of Bogies that now houses the community centre, but were refused. The club lost senior football status in 1976.

In 1978, one of the club's officers was acting as a representative on the old Cabra community council and the issue of Charleville House came up on the agenda. It was proposed to knock it down as both the Legion of Mary and the Pigeon Club had been using it, and due to vandalism, the building had been abandoned. The club's representative proposed to the council that the club would take over the abandoned building. The club executive gave permission, which led the building to be the club's premises for the next 16 years. In early 1980, a fundraiser was held by a number of club members to get money to build a new club house.

In 1983, the club formed a camogie team for the second time. That year was one of the most successful years in the club's history, with the hurlers winning the league, championship and Doyle cup in a two-month period. Also in 1983, the footballers, having won the city inter-league lost out in a playoff with St Anne’s by a point to go to the final to go senior. The intermediate football team won the Stephens cup in 1984 and a number of the juveniles teams won leagues.

A camogie section was set up in 1985. Also in 1985, the senior hurlers reached the quarter-final of the senior hurling championship, losing out by two points to Eoghan Ruadh who reached the final.

In 1992, the club submitted plans for a new clubhouse at Charleville house, but planning permission was refused, but Dublin Corporation offered the club the playground site on Faussagh Avenue, which had been lying idle for a number of years. The club had a general meeting and the members agreed to the move. The club drew up plans for the site, with several members putting their houses as security to allow the club to borrow IR£200,000.

In 1993, the senior hurlers won the senior hurling league and the junior football team won the Mooney Cup. A new clubhouse was opened in Cabra in 1995.

In 1998, the adult camogie team won the Junior B Championship.

In 2000, the club built a new gym complex. This development included a new weight room, sauna, squash court, gym hall and changing rooms. The club also installed an all-weather pitch when the City Council gave the club the remainder of the old playground. The same year, the club regained senior football status by winning the Intermediate Championship. The minor hurlers also won their first ever championship when they beat Na Fianna on a scoreline of 0-9 to 0-8 in the Minor B championship. The minor team also won the Division 3 hurling title and Division 5 football title.

In 2001, the adult camogie team won the Junior A championship. The same year, the junior football team won the league.

In 2009 they won the intermediate championship and reached the Leinster GAA Hurling Club Championship final.

The intermediate football team won the league in 2010 to regain Senior League status.

In 2011, the club won its first ever Senior Hurling B championship by beating St Patrick’s of Palmerstown by a point. The final scoreline was 1-19 to 3-12.

The club won the under-21 B hurling championship in 2012.

In 2013, the club won its first-ever Minor Football B championship in 2013, by beating Trinty Gaels.

In 2014, the senior hurlers won promotion back to the Division 1 ranks after a playoff win against Crumlin after extra time in Bray Emmets.

In 2016, the senior hurlers won its first ever senior hurling league and championship double with a Senior 2 league title and second Senior B Hurling championship within the space of a month. They beat Naomh Barróg in the championship final on a scoreline of 1-16 to 2-10.

In 2018, the intermediate camogie team won the Intermediate 2 Camogie Championship after a 2-7 to 1-9 win over Naomh Olaf. Also in 2018, the intermediate footballers won the play off game against Naomh Barrog to get promoted back to Senior league football

In 2020, all league games were cancelled as a result of the Covid-19 pandemic. The county board decided that only championships would go ahead that season. The senior hurlers won their third Senior B championship in 10 years by beating Cuala B on a scoreline of 2-14 to 0-17. This was followed six days later by the Intermediate footballers, who won their first championship at that level since 2000, when they beat Naomh Barróg on a scoreline of 3-10 to 2-11.

In 2024 The Intermediate footballers won the league to regain Senior league status.

== Honours ==
- Dublin Intermediate Football Championship (3): 1966, 2000, 2020
- Dublin Junior Football Championship (1): 1961
- Dublin Senior B Hurling Championship (3): 2011, 2016, 2020
- Dublin Intermediate Hurling Championship (3): 1969, 1983, 2009
- Dublin Junior Hurling Championship (1): 1965
