= Oisín Gough =

Irish hurler

Personal information
- Native name: Oisín Mac Eochaidh (Irish)
- Born: 2 April 1989 (age 37) Dublin, Ireland
- Height: 6 ft 0 in (183 cm)

Sport
- Sport: Hurling
- Position: Left Corner Back
Club
- Years: Club
- 2007–: Cuala
Club titles
- Dublin titles: 4
- Leinster titles: 2
- All-Ireland Titles: 2
Inter-county
Years	County	Apps (scores)
2009–	Dublin	10
Inter-county titles
- Leinster titles: 1
- NHL: 1

Oisín Gough (born 4 April 1989) is an inter-county senior hurler with Dublin and Cuala.

== County hurling ==
He plays at corner back with his county and club. He made his debut in the National Hurling League against Clare in 2009. He won a Leinster Minor Hurling Championship medal with Dublin in 2007 and a Leinster Senior Hurling championship with Dublin in 2013. He won the Walsh Cup and the National Hurling League with Dublin in 2011.

== Underage hurling ==
He won an All-Ireland Colleges hurling title with Dublin colleges in 2006. He won both the Dublin Minor Football Championship and the Leinster Minor Club Football Championship in 2006 with Cuala. In 2010 he won the Leinster Under-21 Hurling Championship, with Dublin beating Wexford 2–15 to 0–15.

== Personal life ==
He currently plays senior hurling with Cuala. In 2011 he graduated from University College Dublin with a Bsc in Pharmacology. That same year he also began a PhD in Clinical and Translational Research.

Achievements
Preceded by Cathal King	All-Ireland Senior Club Hurling Final winning captain 2017	Succeeded by Paul Schutte
