= 2022 Tyrone Senior Football Championship =

Gaelic football tournament

2022 Tyrone SFC
Tournament details
- County: Tyrone
- Province: Ulster
- Level: Senior
- Year: 2022
- Sponsor: LCC Group
- Date: 22 September - 30 October 2022
- Teams: 16
- Defending champions: Dromore

Winners
- Champions: Errigal Ciarán (8th win)
- Manager: Mark Harte
- Captain: Tommy Canavan
- Qualify for: 2022 Ulster Club SFC

Runners-up
- Runners-up: Carrickmore
- Manager: Noel Hurson; Ryan Daly
- Captain: Rory Donnelly

Promotion/Relegation
- Relegated team(s): Moy (Play-off loser); Clonoe(Play-off loser); Derrylaughan (16th in SFL)

The 2022 Tyrone Senior Football Championship is the 117th edition of Tyrone GAA's premier Gaelic football tournament for senior clubs in County Tyrone, Northern Ireland. The championship consisted of 16 teams and had a straight knock-out format. The winners, Errigal Ciaran, received the O'Neill Cup after their victory over Carrickmore and represent Tyrone in the Ulster Senior Club Football Championship for 2022.

The draw for the championship was made on 7 June 2022.

== Team changes ==
The following teams have changed division since the 2021 championship season.

Promoted from IFC

Greencastle (Division 2 Champions) Moortown (Intermediate Champions)

Relegated from SFC

Eglish (15th in SFL)
Galbally (16th in SFL)
Pomeroy (17th in SFL)
Edendork (18th in SFL)

== Participating teams ==
The following 16 teams took part in the 2022 edition of the Tyrone Senior Football Championship.

Ardboe Ó Donovan Rossa
Omagh St Endas
Dromore St Dympna’s
Killyclogher St Marys
Moy Tír na nÓg
Errigal Ciaran (champions)
Trillick St Macartans
Dungannon Clarkes
Moortown St Malachys
Clonoe Ó Rahillys
Greencastle St Patricks
Donaghmore St Patricks
Carrickmore St Colmcilles (Runners Up)
Coalisland Fianna
Loughmacroy St Teresas
Derrylaughan Kevin Barrys

== Round 1 ==
22 Sep 2022 Round 1	Trillick	0-11 - 3-8	Dungannon

23 Sep 2022 Round 1	Greencastle	0-12 – 0-16	Donaghmore

23 Sep 2022 Round 1	Dromore	3-9 - 1-10	Killyclogher

24 Sep 2022 Round 1	Ardboe	0-9 – 0-14	Omagh St Endas

24 Sep 2022 Round 1	Moy	1-10 – 1-15	Errigal Ciaran

25 Sep 2022 Round 1	Moortown	2-14 – 0-23	Clonoe

25 Sep 2022 Round 1	Loughmacrory	0-9 – 0-7	Derrylaughan

26 Sep 2022 Round 1	Carrickmore	4-7 - 1-8	Coalisland

== Quarter-finals ==
8 Oct 2022 Quarter-final	Clonoe	1-9 – 0-10	Donaghmore

8 Oct 2022 Quarter-final	Carrickmore	0-10 – 0-9	Loughmacrory

9 Oct 2022 Quarter-final	Omagh	0-5 - 0-6	Dromore

9 Oct 2022 Quarter-final	Errigal Ciaran	1-16 - 1-11	Dungannon

== Semi-finals ==
16 Oct 2022 Semi-final	Dromore	0-10 – 0-11	Errigal Ciaran

16 Oct 2022 Semi-final	Clonoe	0-08 – 0-11	Carrickmore

== Final ==
30 October 2022
16:15
Final

Errigal Ciarán	2-11 – 1-12	Carrickmore
Joe Oguz 1-1, Padraig McGirr 1-0, Darragh Canavan 0-3 (0-1f), Ruairí Canavan 0-2, Mark Kavanagh 0-2, Tommy Canavan 0-1 (0-1f), Ben McDonnell 0-1, Peter Harte 0-1	Report	Daniel Fullerton 0-6 (0-5f), Martin Penrose 1-1, Lórcan McGarrity 0-2 (0-1f, 0-1m), Ruairi Slane 0-1, Lorcan McBride 0-1, Mark Donnelly 0-1

Healy Park, Omagh
Referee: Stephen Campbell
