= Leinster Minor Club Football Championship =

The Leinster Minor Club Football Championship is a club competition between the top minor Gaelic football teams in Leinster. The 2006 champions of Leinster are Cuala of Dublin, who defeated Erins Own of Carlow by a scoreline of 3–8 to 1–7. The 2007 final was contested by St Brigids of Dublin and Donaghmore-Ashbourne of Meath, which St. Brigids won. The 2008 final was won by Donaghmore-Ashbourne, who beat St. Geraldine's of Louth. The 2014 final was won by Ferbane/Belmont of Offaly, who beat Newtown Blues of Louth. The 2015 final saw reigning champions Ferbane/Belmont of Offaly take on Ballymun Kickhams of Dublin. The sides were level on 1-12 a piece after full-time and were level again at 1–13 to 1–13 after an extra time. Ballymun Kickhams won the game 4–2 on penalties.

== Roll of honour ==
Year	Winner	County	Opponent	County
2015	Ballymun Kickhams	Dublin	Ferbane/Belmont	Offaly
2014	Ferbane/Belmont	Offaly	Newtown Blues	Louth
2013	Shamrocks	Offaly	Rapparees/Starlights	Wexford
2010	Athy	Kildare	Rhode	Offaly
2009	Na Fianna	Dublin	Athy	Kildare
2008	Donaghmore-Ashbourne	Meath	St. Geraldines	Louth
2007	St. Brigid's	Dublin	Donaghmore-Ashbourne	Meath
2006	Cuala	Dublin	Éire Óg	Carlow
2005	The Heath Gaels	Laois	Éire Óg	Carlow
2004	Kilmacud Crokes	Dublin	Clonguish	Longford

== See also ==
- Leinster Senior Club Football Championship
