= Loughmacrory St Teresa's GAC =

Tyrone-based Gaelic games club

Loughmacrory St Teresa's
- Naomh Treasa Loch Mhic Ruairí
- Founded: 1972
- County: Tyrone
- Nickname: The Lough
- Colours: Black and Amber
- Grounds: Páirc an Locha
- Coordinates: 54°37′41.42″N 7°06′13.01″W

Playing kits
Standard colours	Second colours

Senior Club Championships
	All Ireland	Ulster champions	Tyrone champions
Football:	0	0	1

Loughmacrory St Teresa's is a Gaelic Athletic Association club based in the village of Loughmacrory in County Tyrone, Northern Ireland. They won their first ever Tyrone Senior Championship in 2025 beating Trillick In the Final.

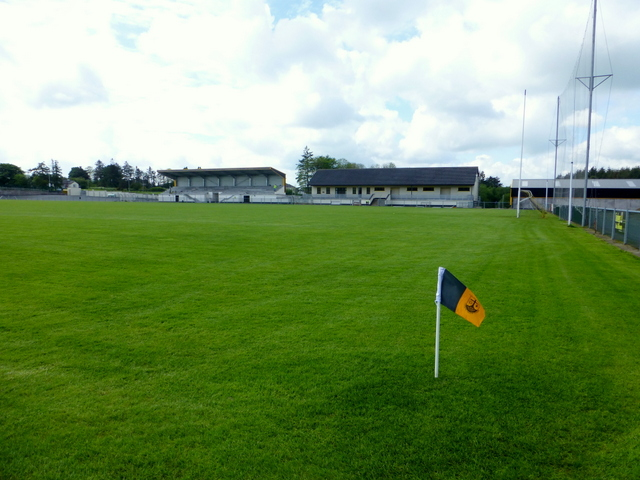
Páirc an Locha

== Honours ==
- Tyrone Senior Football Championship: (1)
  - 2025
- Tyrone Junior Football Championship: (2)
  - 1980, 1993
