= 2024 Dublin Senior Football Championship =

Gaelic football tournament

Tournament details
- County: Dublin
- Province: Leinster
- Year: 2024
- Trophy: Clerys Cup
- Date: 09 August 2024 - 20 October 2024
- Teams: 16 Senior 1; 16 Senior 2
- Defending champions: Kilmacud Crokes

Winners
- Champions: Cuala
- Qualify for: Leinster Club SFC

Runners-up
- Runners-up: Kilmacud Crokes

Other
- Website: Dublin GAA.ie

The 2024 Dublin Senior Football Championship is the 138th edition of Dublin GAA's premier gaelic football tournament for senior clubs in County Dublin, Ireland. 32 teams participate (16 in Senior 1 and 16 in Senior 2), with the winner of Senior 1 representing Dublin in the Leinster Senior Club Football Championship.

Cuala defeated Kilmacud Crokes in the 2024 final to win their first ever Dublin title.

== Senior 1 ==
=== Group 1 ===
| Team | Pld | W | D | L | PF | PA | PD | Pts |
|---|---|---|---|---|---|---|---|---|
| Cuala | 3 | 3 | 0 | 0 | 74 | 32 | +42 | 6 |
| Clontarf | 3 | 2 | 0 | 1 | 63 | 41 | +22 | 4 |
| St Judes | 3 | 1 | 0 | 2 | 46 | 57 | -11 | 2 |
| Fingallians | 3 | 0 | 0 | 3 | 30 | 83 | -53 | 0 |

Round 1

| 10 August 2024 Round 1 | Cuala | 2-14 (20) – (15) 1-12 | Clontarf |
| | | | | Venue: O'Toole Park |
| | | Report |

| 10 August 2024 Round 1 | St Judes | 3-15 (21) – (14) 1-11 | Fingallians |
| | | | | Venue: Balgriffin |

Round 2

| 23 August 2024 Round 2 | Fingallians | 0-07 (7) – (26) 3-17 | Clontarf |

| 24 August 2024 Round 2 | Cuala | 2-15 (21) – (8) 0-08 | St Judes |

Round 3

| 7 September 2024 Round 3 | Clontarf | 3-13 (22) – (14) 1-11 | St Judes |

| 7 September 2024 Round 3 | Fingallians | 0-09 (9) – (33) 4-21 | Cuala |

=== Group 2 ===
| Team | Pld | W | D | L | PF | PA | PD | Pts |
|---|---|---|---|---|---|---|---|---|
| Na Fianna | 3 | 2 | 1 | 0 | 61 | 55 | +6 | 5 |
| Castleknock | 3 | 2 | 0 | 1 | 47 | 44 | +3 | 4 |
| Raheny | 3 | 1 | 0 | 2 | 49 | 47 | +2 | 2 |
| Lucan Sarsfields | 3 | 0 | 1 | 2 | 51 | 62 | -11 | 1 |

Round 1

| 9 August 2024 Round 1 | Raheny | 1-13 (16) – (20) 1-17 | Na Fianna |
| | | | | Venue: Parnell Park |

| 10 August 2024 Round 1 | Castleknock | 0-17 (17) – (15) 1-12 | Lucan Sarsfields |
| | | | | Venue: O'Toole Park |

Round 2

| 23 August 2024 Round 2 | Na Fianna | 0-18 (18) – (16) 2-10 | Castleknock |

| 24 August 2024 Round 2 | Lucan Sarsfields | 1-10 (13) – (22) 2-16 | Raheny |

Round 3

| 7 September 2024 Round 3 | Raheny | 0-11 (11) – (14) 0-14 | Castleknock |

| 7 September 2024 Round 3 | Na Fianna | 1-20 (23) – (23) 4-11 | Lucan Sarsfields |

=== Group 3 ===
| Team | Pld | W | D | L | PF | PA | PD | Pts |
|---|---|---|---|---|---|---|---|---|
| Ballymun Kickhams | 3 | 3 | 0 | 0 | 50 | 35 | +15 | 6 |
| Ballyboden St. Enda's | 3 | 2 | 0 | 1 | 54 | 41 | +13 | 4 |
| Ballinteer St John's | 3 | 1 | 0 | 2 | 47 | 55 | -8 | 2 |
| St Sylvester's | 3 | 0 | 0 | 3 | 33 | 53 | -20 | 0 |

Round 1

| 10 August 2024 Round 1 | Ballyboden St. Enda's | 1-11 (14) – (15) 1-12 | Ballymun Kickhams |
| | | | | Venue: Parnell Park |

| 10 August 2024 Round 1 | Ballinteer St John's | 2-14 (20) – (13) 1-10 | St Sylvester's |
| | | | | Venue: Parnell Park |

Round 2

| 24 August 2024 Round 2 | St Sylvester's | 1-09 (12) – (15) 0-15 | Ballyboden St. Enda's |

| 24 August 2024 Round 2 | Ballymun Kickhams | 2-11 (17) – (13) 0-13 | Ballinteer St John's |

Round 3

| 8 September 2024 Round 3 | Ballyboden St. Enda's | 4-13 (35) – (14) 2-08 | Ballinteer St John's |

| 8 September 2024 Round 3 | Ballymun Kickhams | 1-15 (18) – (8) 0-08 | St Sylvester's |

=== Group 4 ===
| Team | Pld | W | D | L | PF | PA | PD | Pts |
|---|---|---|---|---|---|---|---|---|
| Kilmacud Crokes | 3 | 2 | 1 | 0 | 49 | 38 | +11 | 5 |
| St Vincents | 3 | 1 | 1 | 1 | 37 | 40 | -3 | 3 |
| Thomas Davis | 3 | 1 | 1 | 1 | 52 | 56 | -4 | 3 |
| Skerries Harps | 3 | 0 | 1 | 2 | 55 | 59 | -4 | 1 |

Round 1

| 9 August 2024 Round 1 | Kilmacud Crokes | 2-15 (21) – (19) 3-10 | Skerries Harps |
| | | | | Venue: Parnell Park |

| 10 August 2024 Round 1 | Thomas Davis | 1-10 (13) – (19) 1-16 | St Vincents |
| | | | | Venue: Balgriffin |

Round 2

| 24 August 2024 Round 2 | St Vincents | 0-08 (8) – (17) 0-17 | Kilmacud Crokes |

| 24 August 2024 Round 2 | Skerries Harps | 3-17 (26) – (28) 5-13 | Thomas Davis |

Round 3

| 8 September 2024 Round 3 | Kilmacud Crokes | 0-11 (11) – (11) 1-08 | Thomas Davis |

| 8 September 2024 Round 3 | Skerries Harps | 1-07 (10) – (10) 0-10 | St Vincents |

=== Knockout stages ===
| Quarter-Finals | | Semi-Finals | | Final |
| Ballymun | 0-10 |
| St Vincents | 1-05 | Ballymun | 1-08 |
| Cuala | 2-13 | Cuala | 0-16 |
| Castleknock | 1-10 | | | Cuala | 0-14 |
| Na Fianna | 1-20 | | | Kilmacud Crokes | 1-10 |
| Clontarf | 1-15 | Kilmacud Crokes | 1-12 |
| Kilmacud Crokes | 1-17 | Na Fianna | 0-12 |
| Ballyboden St. Enda's | 0-13 |

=== Quarter-finals ===
| 20 September 2024 Quarter-final | Cuala | 2-13 (19) – (13) 1-10 | Castleknock |
| 18:45 IST (UTC+1) | | | | Venue: Parnell Park |

| 20 September 2024 Quarter-final | Ballymun Kickhams | 0-10 (10) – (8) 1-05 | St Vincents |
| 20:30 IST (UTC+1) | | | | Venue: Parnell Park |

| 21 September 2024 Quarter-final | Na Fianna | 1-20 (23) – (18) 1-15 | Clontarf |
| 15:30 IST (UTC+1) | | | | Venue: Parnell Park |

| 21 September 2024 Quarter-final | Kilmacud Crokes | 1-17 (20) – (13) 0-13 (a.e.t.) | Ballyboden St. Enda's |
| 17:30 IST (UTC+1) | | (FT: 0-13 – 0-13) | | Venue: Parnell Park |

=== Semi-finals ===
| 5 October 2024 Semi-final | Ballymun Kickhams | 1-08 (11) – (16) 0-16 | Cuala |
| 17:15 IST (UTC+1) | | | | Venue: Parnell Park |

| 6 October 2024 Semi-final | Kilmacud Crokes | 1-12 (15) – (12) 0-12 | Na Fianna |
| 16:00 IST (UTC+1) | | | | Venue: Parnell Park |

=== Final ===
| 20 October 2024 Final | Cuala | 0-14 (14) – (13) 1-10 | Kilmacud Crokes |
| 14:30 IST (UTC+1) | | | | Venue: Parnell Park |
| | | Report | | TV: TG4 |

=== Relegation play-offs ===
| 21 September 2024 Relegation play-off | St Sylvester's | 1-21 (24) – (21) 2-15 | Skerries Harps |
| 17:30 IST (UTC+1) |

| 22 September 2024 Relegation play-off | Fingallians | 0-11 (11) – (26) 4-14 | Lucan Sarsfields |
| 17:30 IST (UTC+1) |
