= Cuala G.A.A. =

Gaelic games club

Cuala
- Founded: 1974
- County: Dublin
- Colours: Red and white
- Grounds: Dalkey, Glenamuck, Meadow Vale, Shankill, Thomastown
- Coordinates: 53°17′14.50″N 6°11′58.93″W

Playing kits
Home Kit	Change Kit

Senior Club Championships
	All Ireland	Leinster champions	Dublin champions
Football:	1	1	2
Hurling:	2	2	8

Cuala GAA club (or Cuala GAC, [ˈkuəlˠə] KOO-luh) is a Gaelic Athletic Association club based in Dalkey in the south of County Dublin, Ireland. It fields teams in Dublin GAA competitions. Cuala is primarily based in a sports and social centre in Dalkey, and also has playing facilities in Glenageary, Meadow Vale/Clonkeen Park, Shankill and Sallynoggin.

The club name derives from Cualu or Cuala, an ancient kingdom of Ireland that stretched roughly from the Liffey to Arklow.

== History ==
The club was founded as a result of a merger between Dalkey Mitchels and Cuala Casements in 1974.

The club won consecutive All-Ireland Senior Club Hurling Championships in 2017 and 2018.

The club won their first Dublin Senior Football Championship title in 2024 after defeating reigning champions Kilmacud Crokes 0-14 to 1-10 in the final and then went on to win the Leinster SFC and All Ireland SFC becoming only the second club ever to win All Irelands in both codes

The club replaced the Davy Group of stockbrokers as its jersey sponsor with biotech company Amgen in 2019 as part of a deal that attracted notice outside the area. Huawei sponsors the hurlers.

== Notable players ==
- Mick Holden, represented Dublin at all levels both hurling and football, 1983 Senior All-Ireland football winner
- Michael Fitzsimons, member of the Dublin teams that won the All-Ireland Championship in 2011, 2013, 2015, 2016, 2017, 2018, 2019, 2020 and 2023. One of three players to have won a record breaking 9 All-Ireland Senior Football winners medals.
- Con O'Callaghan, member of the Dublin teams that won the All-Ireland Championship in 2016, 2017, 2018, 2019, 2020 and 2023.
- David Treacy Dublin senior hurler
- Cian O'Callaghan Dublin senior hurler
- Oisín Gough Dublin senior hurler

== Honours ==
=== Hurling ===
- All-Ireland Senior Club Hurling Championship Winners 2016–17 2017–18
- Leinster Senior Club Hurling Championship Winners 2016 2017
- Dublin Senior Hurling Championship Winners – 1989, 1991, 1994, 2015, 2016, 2017, 2019, 2020
- Dublin Senior Hurling League Winners 1976, 1980, 1991, 2015, 2016, 2019, 2020
- Dublin Junior Hurling Championship Winners 1977, 1985, 1993
- Dublin Junior B Hurling Championship 2018
- Dublin Minor B Hurling Championship Winners 2015
- Boland Cup Winners 1983
- Dublin Under 21 Hurling Championship Winners 2009
- Dublin Minor D Hurling Championship Winners 2007, 2020

=== Camogie ===
- Dublin Camogie Division 4 League Winners 2017
- Dublin Camogie Division 5 League Winners 2016
- Dublin Camogie Division 7 League Winners 2016
- Dublin Camogie Division 5 Championship Winners 2015
- All Ireland Féile Divisional Finalist 2015

=== Ladies' Gaelic Football ===
- Dublin Junior D Ladies Football Championship Winners 2004
- Dublin Junior C Ladies Football Championship Winners 2006
- Dublin Div 2 Feile Ladies Football Championship [Under 14s] Winners 2007
- Dublin Div 4 League Ladies Football Winners 2010
- Dublin Group B Ladies Football Championship Winners 2010
- Dublin Junior Ladies Football Championship 2017
- Leinster Junior Ladies Football Championship 2017

=== Men's Gaelic football ===
- All-Ireland Senior Football Championship Winners 2024–25
- Leinster Senior Football Championship Winners 2024
- Dublin Senior Football Championship Winners 2024, 2026
- Dublin Under 21 Football Championship Winners 1976, 2009, 2019
- Dublin Under 21 Football League Winners 1976
- Dublin Junior Football Championship Winners 1978
- Dublin Junior B Football Championship: Winners 2008
- Dublin Intermediate Football Championship Winners 1981, 2012
- Loving Cup Winners 1981
- Dublin AFL Div. 3 Winners 1985
- Dublin AFL Div. 4 Winners 2002
- Dublin AFL Div. 8 Winners 2002, 2016
- Dublin AFL Div. 10S Winners 2010
- Dublin Minor Football Championship Winners 2006, 2013
- Leinster Minor Club Football Championship Winners 2006
- Dublin Senior B Football Championship Winners 2015, 2020, 2021
- Dublin Feile Div 4 Football Winners 2017
