= Errigal Ciarán GAC =

Tyrone-based Gaelic games club

Errigal Ciarán
- Aireagal Chiaráin
- Founded: 1990
- County: Tyrone
- Nickname: Errigal
- Colours: White, Blue & Yellow
- Grounds: Cardinal MacRory Park, Dunmoyle
- Coordinates: 54°31′28.24″N 7°04′08.35″W

Playing kits
Standard colours

Senior Club Championships
	All Ireland	Ulster champions	Tyrone champions
Football:	-	3	11
Ladies' football:	-	1	4

Errigal Ciarán GAC is a Gaelic Athletic Association Gaelic football club in southern County Tyrone, Northern Ireland. It represents the parish of the same name, which incorporates the village of Ballygawley, Altamuskin, Glencull and Garvaghy. The club was founded in its current guise in 1990, succeeding the Ballygawley St Ciaran's club which represented the parish from the 1920s until the 1980s.

== History ==
From 1928 until 1982, the parish of Errigal Ciarán was represented by Ballygawley St Ciaran's. The club's re-formation as Errigal Ciarán in 1990 gave rise to a successful era over the next two decades, with the club's most recent success coming in 2024 when they captured their 9th Tyrone Senior Football Championship and won their 3rd ever Ulster Senior Club Football Championship. The club had also got to the final of the 2024-25 All-Ireland Senior Club Football Championship where they narrowly lost to Cuala after a strong fightback from a 13 point deficit at half time. The club has also produced a number of inter-county players, such as Peter Canavan and the former Tyrone manager, Mickey Harte, who started his managerial career guiding Errigal to Ulster Championship success. Errigal Ciarán are the only club team in Tyrone to win the Ulster Senior Club Football Championship, with three championship successes to date, in 1993, 2002 and most recently in 2024.

The club are also represented in the Tyrone ACL Div 3 by a Junior (Thirds) team and in the Tyrone Ladies' senior football league Division 1.

The clubs men's Junior team entered the Tyrone ACL at the beginning of the 2007 season, having previously represented the club in memorial and friendly tournaments around Ulster. This team reached the Tyrone Junior championship semi-final on one occasion (2011) and followed this up with their most successful league campaign to date in 2012, reaching the promotion playoffs.

The club's senior ladies' team play in Tyrone's top flight. They have won the Tyrone senior championship title on two occasions, in 2007 when they went on to win the Ulster Ladies' senior club football championship, and again in 2012 when they defeated a highly fancied Carrickmore side. In 2023, they defeated St.Macartans Augher in Extra time to become champions of Ladies football in Tyrone once again.

== Achievements ==
- Tyrone Senior Football Championship: (9)
  - 1993, 1994, 1997, 2000, 2002, 2006, 2012, 2022, 2024
- Ulster Senior Club Football Championship: (3)
  - 1993, 2002, 2024

== Notable players ==
- Pascal Canavan
- Peter Canavan
- John Devine
- David Harte
- Peter Harte
- Cormac McGinley
- Enda McGinley
- Darragh Canavan
- Ruairí Canavan
- Malachy O'Rourke, who transferred to Errigal Ciarán
