= 2012 All-Ireland Senior Football Championship =

Championship details
- Dates: 6 May – 23 September 2012
- Teams: 33

All-Ireland Champions
- Winning team: Donegal (2nd win)
- Captain: Michael Murphy
- Manager: Jim McGuinness

All-Ireland Finalists
- Losing team: Mayo
- Captain: David Clarke
- Manager: James Horan

Provincial Champions
- Munster: Cork
- Leinster: Dublin
- Ulster: Donegal
- Connacht: Mayo

Championship statistics
- No. matches played: 36
- Goals total: 48 (1.33 per game)
- Points total: 904 (25.11 per game)
- Top Scorer: Colm McFadden (4–32)
- Player of the Year: Karl Lacey

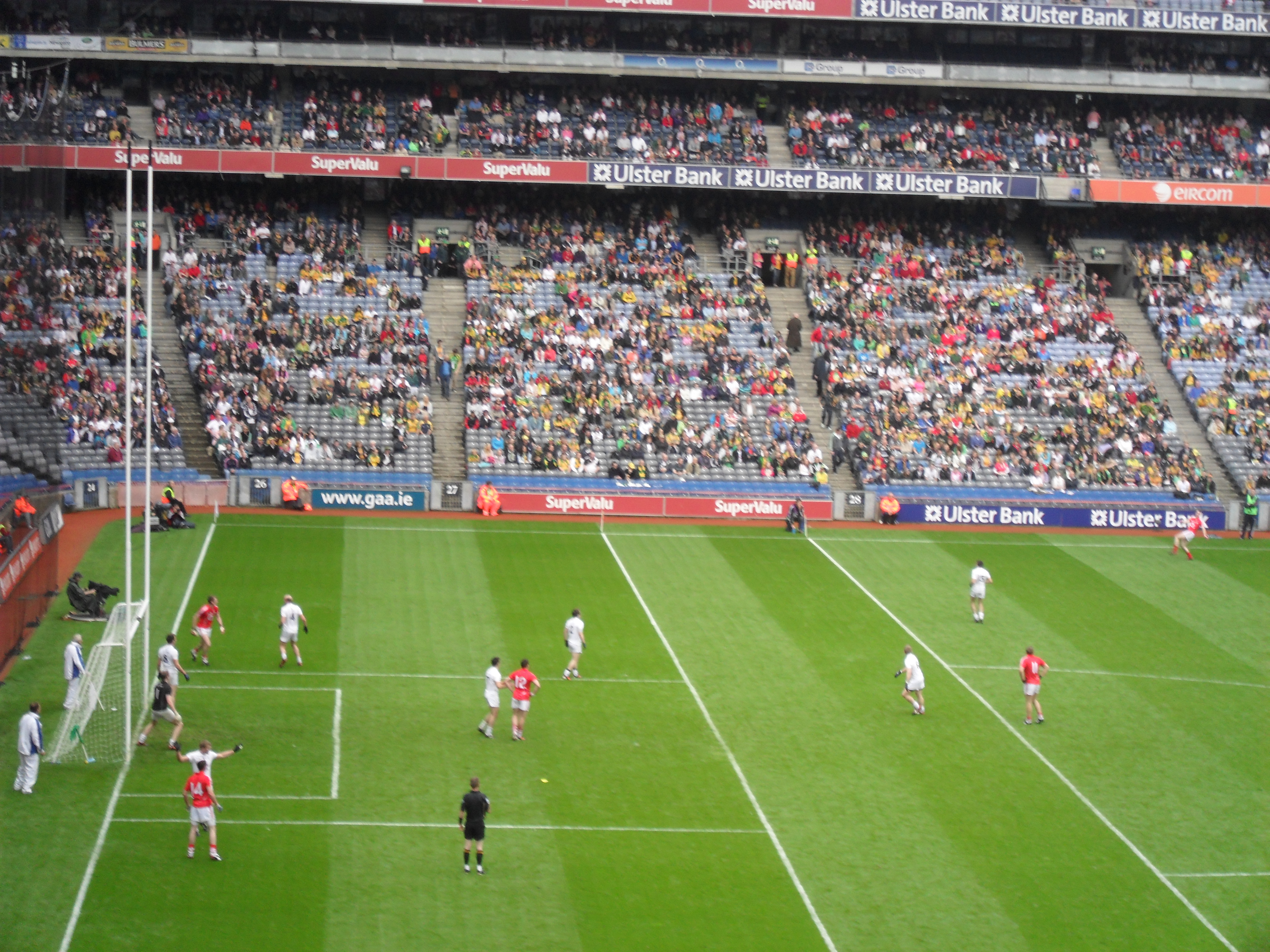
Quarter-final, 5 August 2012, Croke Park; Cork v. Kildare

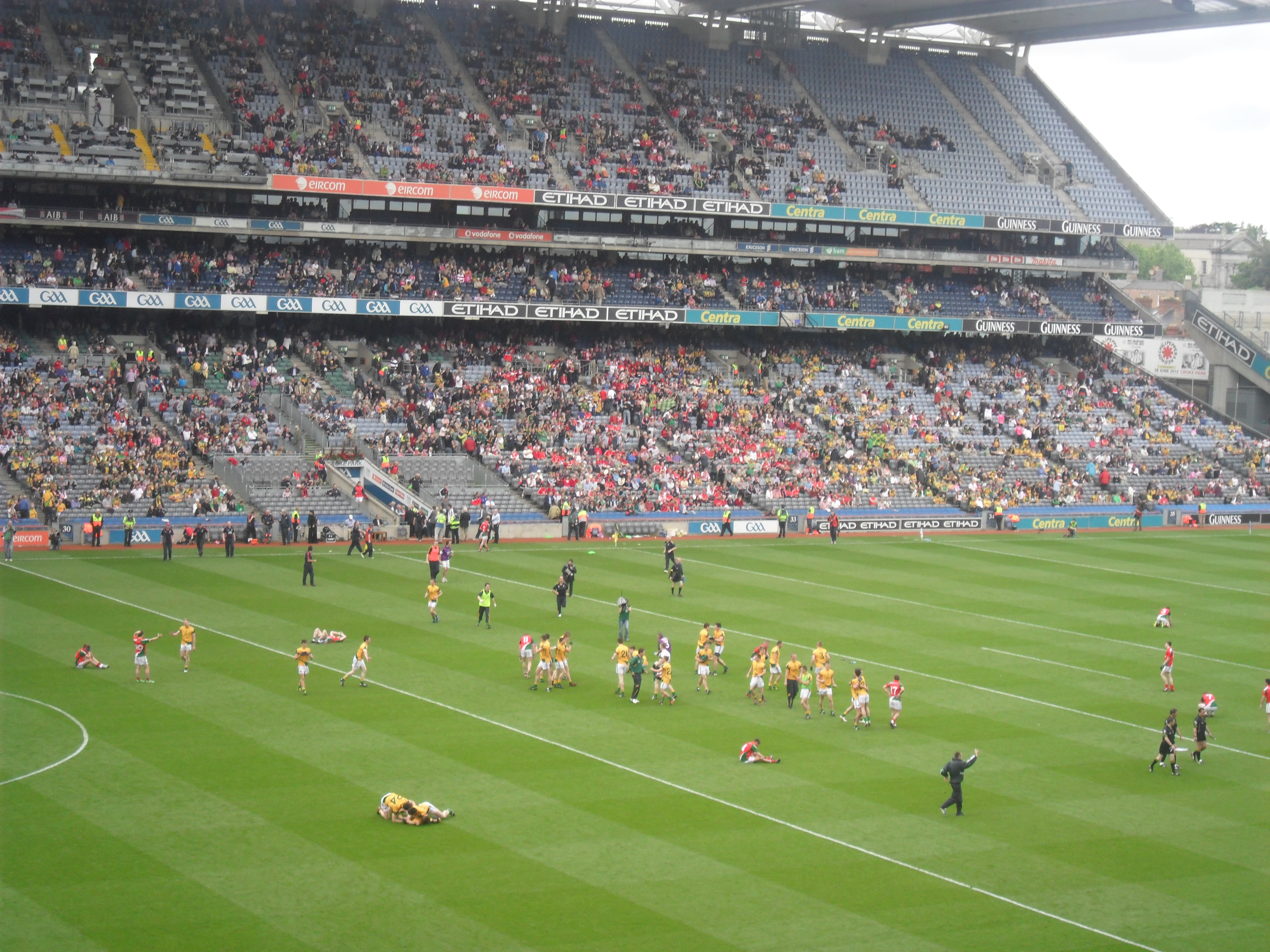
Semi-final, 26 August 2012, Croke Park; Cork v. Donegal

The 2012 All-Ireland Senior Football Championship was the 126th edition of the GAA's premier inter-county Gaelic football tournament, played between 31 counties of Ireland (excluding Kilkenny who only take part in the hurling championship), London and New York.

The 2012 All-Ireland Senior Football Championship Final took place at Croke Park on 23 September 2012, with Donegal emerging victorious. Having reclaimed the Ulster Senior Football Championship with wins over Cavan, Derry, Tyrone and Down, they met and bet Kerry in the All-Ireland quarter-final, in what was widely considered the game of the Championship. They then overcame Cork in the semi-final and Mayo in the final in Jim McGuinness's second season in charge, allowing team captain Michael Murphy to hold the Sam Maguire Cup aloft.

Colm McFadden finished as the competition's top scorer and Karl Lacey was named the competition's best player.

== Teams ==
A total of 33 teams contested the championship. These included 31 teams from Ireland as well as London and New York. As in previous years, Kilkenny decided not to field a team.

== Format ==
The All-Ireland Senior Football Championship of 2012 was run on a provincial basis as usual. It was a knockout tournament with pairings drawn at random in the respective provinces – there was no seeds.

Each match was played as a single leg. If a match was drawn there was a replay. If that match ended in a draw a period of extra time was played; however, if both sides were still level at the end of extra time another replay would have taken place.

Connacht Championship

Quarter-finals: (3 matches) These were three matches between six of the Connacht teams drawn first. The three winning teams advanced to the semi-finals, while the three losing teams entered the All-Ireland qualifiers.

Semi-finals: (4 matches) The winners of the three quarter-final games joined the other two Connacht teams to make up the semi-final pairings. The two winning teams advanced to the final, while the two losing teams entered the All-Ireland qualifiers.

Final: (1 match) The winners of the two semi-finals contested this game. The winning team advanced to the All-Ireland quarter-final, while the losing team entered the All-Ireland qualifiers.

Leinster Championship

Preliminary round: (3 matches) These were three matches between six of the Leinster teams drawn first. The three winning teams advanced to the quarter-finals, while the three losing teams entered the All-Ireland qualifiers.

Quarter-finals: (4 matches) The winners of the three preliminary round games joined the other five Leinster teams to make up four quarter-final pairings. The four winning teams advanced to the semi-finals, while the four losing teams entered the All-Ireland qualifiers.

Semi-finals: (2 matches) The four winners of the quarter-finals made up the semi-final pairings. The two winning teams advanced to the final, while the two losing teams entered the All-Ireland qualifiers.

Final: (1 match) The winners of the two semi-finals contested this game. The winning team advanced to the All-Ireland quarter-final, while the losing team entered the All-Ireland qualifiers.

Munster Championship

Quarter-finals: (2 matches) These were to be two matches between four of the Munster teams drawn first. The two winning teams advanced to the semi-finals, while the two losing teams entered the All-Ireland qualifiers.

Semi-finals: (4 matches) The winners of the two quarter-final games joined the other two Munster teams to make up the semi-final pairings. The two winning teams advanced to the final, while the two losing teams entered the All-Ireland qualifiers.

Final: (1 match) The winners of the two semi-finals contested this game. The winning team advanced to the All-Ireland quarter-final, while the losing team entered the All-Ireland qualifiers.

Ulster Championship

Preliminary round: (1 match) This was a lone match between two of the Ulster teams drawn first. The winning team advanced to the quarter-finals, while the losing team entered the All-Ireland qualifiers.

Quarter-finals: (4 matches) The winners of the lone preliminary round game joined the other seven Ulster teams to make up four quarter-final pairings. The four winning teams advanced to the semi-finals, while the four losing teams entered the All-Ireland qualifiers.

Semi-finals: (2 matches) The four winners of the quarter-finals made up the semi-final pairings. The two winning teams advanced to the final, while the two losing teams entered the All-Ireland qualifiers.

Final: (1 match) The winners of the two semi-finals contested this game. The winning team advanced to the All-Ireland quarter-final, while the losing team entered the All-Ireland qualifiers.

Qualifiers

The qualifiers gave teams defeated in the provincial championships another chance at winning the All-Ireland title.

Round 1 (8 matches): the sixteen teams who failed to reach a provincial semi-final entered the qualifiers at this stage (New York do not compete). An open draw was made to determine the eight match pairings.

Round 2 (8 matches): the eight teams who failed to progress from their provincial semi-finals entered the qualifiers at this stage. They were paired with the eight winners from round 1 of the qualifiers. An open draw was made to determine the eight match pairings.

Round 3 (4 matches): the eight teams from round 2 of the qualifiers were paired against each other. An open draw was made to determine the four match pairings.

Round 4 (4 matches): the four teams who lost their provincial finals entered the qualifiers at this stage. They were paired with the four winners from round 3 of the qualifiers. An open draw was made to determine the four match pairings. The four winners advanced to the All-Ireland quarter-finals.

All-Ireland Series

Quarter-finals: (4 matches) the four teams from round 4 of the qualifiers were paired against the four provincial winners. An open draw was made to determine the four match pairings. The four winning teams advanced to the semi-finals, while the two losing teams were eliminated from the championship.

Semi-finals: (2 matches) The four winners of the quarter-finals make up the semi-final pairings. The two winning teams advanced to the final, while the two losing teams were eliminated from the championship.

Final: (1 match) The winners of the two semi-finals contested this game.

== Fixtures and results ==
=== Munster Senior Football Championship ===
Quarter-finals
Limerick	2–12
Waterford	0–7
Tipperary	0–10
Kerry	0–16

Semi-finals
Limerick	0–15
Clare	1–13
Kerry	0–12
Cork	0–17

Munster final
Clare	0–13
Cork	3–16

8 July 2012
2:00pm
Final

Cork	3–16 – 0–13	Clare
A Walsh 1–1, C Sheehan, C O'Neill 0–4 each, N Murphy, F Goold 1–0 each, D O'Connor, D Goulding, P Kerrigan all 0–2 each, B O'Driscoll 0–1.	Report	M O'Shea 0–4, R Donnelly, D Tubridy (2f) 0–3 each, G Brennan 0–2, Gordan Kelly 0–1.

Gaelic Grounds, Limerick
Attendance: 9,139
Referee: E Kinsella (Laois)

=== Leinster Senior Football Championship ===
Preliminary round
Westmeath	0–14
Louth	2–9
Longford	1–10
Laois	0–12
Meath	0–16
Wicklow	0–11

Quarter-finals
Louth	0–12
Dublin	2–22
Longford	0–15
Wexford	1–13
Meath	2–21
Carlow	1–9
Offaly	0–6
Kildare	0–19

Semi-finals
Dublin	2–11
Wexford	1–10
Meath	1–17
Kildare	1–11

Leinster final
Dublin	2–13
Meath	1–13

22 July 2012
4:00pm
Final

Dublin	2–13 – 1–13	Meath
B Brogan (4f) 1–7, D Bastick 1–0, A Brogan, E O’Gara 0–2 each, K McManamon, J McCarthy 0–1 each	Report	B Farrell (6f) 0–7, J Queeney 1–0, G Reilly 0–3, S Bray, J Sheridan (‘45’), D Tobin 0–1 each

Croke Park, Dublin
Attendance: 69, 656
Referee: Marty Duffy (Sligo)

=== Connacht Senior Football Championship ===
Quarter-finals
New York	0–6
Sligo	3–21
Galway	3–15
Roscommon	0–10
London	1–8
Leitrim	0–12

Semi-finals
Sligo	2–14
Galway	0–15
Mayo	4–20
Leitrim	0–10

Connacht final
Sligo	0–10
Mayo	0–12

15 July 2012
2:00pm
Final

Sligo	0–10 – 0–12	Mayo
A Marren 0–3 (2f), D Maye (f, '45'), A Costello (2f), M Breheny (1f) 0–2 each, D Kelly 0–1.	Report	C O’Connor 0–3 (2f, 1 ’45), A Dillon 0–2, A Moran, B Moran, L Keegan, C Boyle, A O’Shea, D Geraghty, E Varley (f) 0–1 each.

Dr. Hyde Park, Roscommon
Attendance: 23,257
Referee: Cormac Reilly (Meath)

=== Ulster Senior Football Championship ===
Preliminary round
Cavan	1–10
Donegal	1–16

Quarter-finals
Donegal	2–13
Derry	0–9
Tyrone	0–19
Armagh	1–13
Monaghan	1–12
Antrim	1–9
Down	2–10
Fermanagh	1–8

Semi-finals
Donegal	0–12
Tyrone	0–10
Monaghan	1–13
Down	1–14

Ulster final
Donegal	2–18
Down	0–13

22 July 2012
2:00pm
Final

Down	0–13 – 2–18	Donegal
L Doyle (2f) 0–4, D O’Hare (1f) 0–2, C Laverty, A Rogers, K McKernan, A Brannigan, C Maginn, D Hughes, E McCartan 0–1 each	Report	L McLoone, F McGlynn 1–0 each, C McFadden (3f) 0–6, Declan Walsh, R Bradley, M McHugh, M McElhinney 0–2 each, David Walsh, D McLaughlin, P McBrearty, M Murphy 0–1 each

St. Tiernach's Park, Clones
Attendance: 34, 696
Referee: Joe McQuillan (Cavan)

=== All-Ireland qualifiers ===
==== Round 1 ====
On 18 June 2012, the draw was made for the first round of the All-Ireland qualifiers. This draw contained all the teams who had been knocked out of their provincial competitions prior to the semi-final stage, apart from New York. It was broadcast live on RTÉ Radio 1's Morning Ireland for the first time.

30 June 2012 Round 1	London	2–09 – 2–11	Antrim	Emerald GAA Grounds, Ruislip
1:00pm	E O'Neill, C McCallion 1–1 each, M Mullins (1f), S McVeigh 0–2 each, S Kelly (f), J Scanlon, M Gottsche 0–1 each.	Report	T McCann 0–5 (4f), A Gallagher, K Niblock 1–0 each, J Loughery, C Murray 0–2 each, M Sweeney, C Kelly 0–1 each.	Referee: P Hughes (Armagh)

30 June 2012 Round 1	Wicklow	1–17 – 0–15 (AET)	Waterford	Aughrim County Ground, Aughrim
2:30pm	C McGraynor 1–2, J McGrath (1 '45), J Kelly 0–3 each, S Furlong (1f), T Hannon (1f) 0–2 each, A Byrne, D Hayden, N Gaffney, J Stafford, N Mernagh 0–1 each.	Report	P Hurney 0–5, P Whyte (2f, 1 '45), M Ferncombe (1f) 0–3 each, S Briggs, T Grey, G Hurney, JJ Hutchinson 0–1 each.	Referee: P O'Sullivan (Kerry)

30 June 2012 Round 1	Laois	1–10 – 0–09	Carlow	O'Moore Park, Portlaoise
7:00pm	J O'Loughlin 1–1, MJ Tierney 0–3 (2f), R Munnelly 0–2 (1f), B Quigley, D O'Connor, C Kelly, D Conway (f) 0–1 each	Report	B Murphy 0–5 (3f), JJ Smith (2f), D St Ledger (1f) 0–2 each.	Referee: S Doyle (Wexford)

30 June 2012 Round 1	Westmeath	1–15 – 0–12	Louth	Cusack Park, Mullingar
7:00pm	C McCormack 1–3, G Egan, J Heslin (4f) 0–4 each, D Glennon 0–3 (1f), J Dolan 0–1.	Report	D Clarke 0-4f, J McEneaney 0-3f, D Crilly, R Finnegan, D Byrne, A Hoey, JP Rooney 0–1 each.	Referee: D Fahy (Longford)

30 June 2012 Round 1	Tipperary	1–12 – 0–10	Offaly	Semple Stadium, Thurles
7:00pm	M Quinlivan 0–4 (1f), A Maloney 0–3, P Acheson 1–0, P Austin, R Ryan 0–2 each, B Mulvihill 0–1.	Report	K Casey 0–5 (1f), N Dunne 0–3 (2f), N McNamee 0–2.	Referee: C Lane (Cork)

30 June 2012 Round 1	Longford	0–17 – 2–8	Derry	Pearse Park, Longford
7:00pm	S McCormack 0–11 (9f), F McGee, B Kavanagh, B McElavaney, P McCormack, CP Smyth, M Quinn ('45') 0–1 each.	Report	B McGoldrick 2–0, P Bradley 0–3 (1f), J McCamely 0–2, M Lynch, E McGuckin, E Bradley 0–1 each.	Referee: Michael Duffy (Sligo)

1 July 2012 Round 1	Roscommon	1–11 – 1–09	Armagh	Dr. Hyde Park, Roscommon
2:30pm	D Shine 0–7 (6f), S Kilbride 1–1 (1f), C Shine, K Mannion, C Cregg 0–1 each	Report	J Clarke 1–3, A Forker (2f), T Kernan 0–2 each, J Hanratty, A Duffy 0–1 each	Referee: Maurice Deegan (Laois)

1 July 2012 Round 1	Fermanagh	0–15 – 3–13	Cavan	Brewster Park, Enniskillen
2:30pm	D Kille 0–9 (8f); T Corrigan 0–3; P Ward 0–2 (1f); R Jones 0–1	Report	J Brady 0–5 (2f); G McKiernan, E Keating, N McDermott (1f) 1–1 each; D Reilly, N Smith, T Corr, K Tierney, D McKiernan 0–1 each	Referee: B Cassidy (Derry)

==== Round 2 ====
On 2 July 2012, the draw was made for the second round of the All-Ireland qualifiers. This draw contained all the teams who had been knocked out of their provincial competitions at the semi-final stage in one pot and the winners of the first round of the qualifiers in the second pot.

15 July 2012 Round 2	Westmeath	1–12 – 2–10	Kerry	Cusack Park, Mullingar
15:00	J Heslin (4f) 0-05, David Glennon (1pen) 1–0, K Martin (1f) 0-02, P Sharry, G Egan, D Corroon, Denis Glennon, R Foley 0-01 each	Report	B Sheehan (1pen) (3f) 1-03, Darran O’Sullivan 1–0, C Cooper (2f) 0-03, J O’Donoghue, P Galvin 0-02 each	Attendance: 6,620; Referee: M Higgins (Fermanagh)

14 July 2012 Round 2	Longford	1–15 – 1–21 (AET)	Limerick	Pearse Park, Longford
14:00	S McCormack 0-08 (4f), F McGee 0-04, N Mulligan 1-00, P Barden 0-02, D Barden 0-01	Report	D O’Connor 1-02, I Ryan 0-05 (3f), E O’Connor, I Corbett 0-03 each, S Buckley 0-02, S Kelly, S Lucey, B Scanlon (0-01 ‘45’), J McCarthy, M Sheehan, S O’Carroll 0-01 each	Referee: P Hughes (Armagh)

14 July 2012 Round 2	Antrim	0–11 – 0–10	Galway	Casement Park, Belfast
15:00	T McCann 0-04 (2f), M McCann 0-03, J Loughrey, C Kelly, A Gallagher, D O’Hagan 0-01 each	Report	M Hehir (3f) 0-03, P Joyce (1f) M Meehan (2f) 0-02 each, G O'Donnell, C Doherty, P Conroy 0-01 each	Referee: D Fahy (Longford)

14 July 2012 Round 2	Leitrim	0–13 – 0–10	Wicklow	Páirc Seán Mac Diarmada, Carrick-on-Shannon
18:00	E Mulligan 0–6 (6f), J Glancy 0–5, R Cox, G Hickey 0–1 each	Report	J Kelly 0–3, S Furlong (1f), J McGrath 0–2 each, T Hannon (1f), D Healy, N Mernagh 0–1 each	Attendance: 3,346; Referee: B Cassidy (Derry)

14 July 2012 Round 2	Tipperary	1–13 – 0–15	Wexford	Semple Stadium, Thurles
17:00	M Quinlivan 0-04 (1f), D Leahy 1-00, P Austin, B Fox & A Maloney (2f) 0-02 each, A Campbell, H Coghlan & P Acheson 0-01 each	Report	S Roche 0-05 (3f), R Barry 0-04 (3f, 1 45), PJ Banville 0-03, C Lyng 0–2, B Brosnan 0-01	Referee: Michael Duffy (Sligo)

15 July 2012 Round 2	Cavan	1–09 – 3–20	Kildare	Breffni Park, Cavan
15:00	E Keating 1–01, N McDermott (3f) 0-03, J Brady (3f) 0-03, G McKiernan 0-02	Report	A Smith 1-05, E O’Flaherty (7f) 0-08, M Conway (2f) 1-04, E Bolton 1–0, J Doyle, S Johnston (1f), D Earley 0-01 each	Attendance: 14,558; Referee: Marty Duffy (Sligo)

15 July 2012 Round 2	Laois	2–12 – 0–12	Monaghan	O'Moore Park, Portlaoise
15:00	C Kelly 1-02, B Quigley 1-01, R Munnelly 0-03 (3f), D O’Connor 0-02, C Boyle, P Clancy, G Walsh, MJ Tierney (1 ‘45’) 0-01 each	Report	C McManus 0-05 (3f), P Finlay 0-03 (2f), T Freeman, D Clerkin, D Mone, O Lennon 0-01 each	Referee: David Coldrick (Meath)

14 July 2012 Round 2	Roscommon	0–08 – 1–16	Tyrone	Dr. Hyde Park, Roscommon
14:00	C Cregg 0–4, D Shine 0–2 (1f), S Kilbride, G Heneghan (1f) 0–1 each	Report	P Harte 1–0 (pen), O Mulligan 0–5 (2f), D McCurry 0–4, J McMahon (1f), M Penrose (1f) 0–2 each, N McKenna, S O’Neill, J Lafferty 0–1 each	Referee: R Hickey (Clare)

==== Round 3 ====
21 July 2012 Round 3	Kerry	1–16 – 1–06	Tyrone	Fitzgerald Stadium, Killarney
	C Cooper 0-05 (1f), K Donaghy 1-01, B Sheehan (3f), Declan O’Sullivan 0-03 each, James O’Donoghue 0-02, P Galvin, P Curtin 0-01 each	Report	C Gormley 1-00, M Penrose (1f), D McCurry, C Cavanagh, Sean O’Neill, C Clarke, A Cassidy 0-01 each	Attendance: 24,370; Referee: David Coldrick (Meath)

21 July 2012 Round 3	Kildare	0–19 – 0–12 (AET)	Limerick	O'Moore Park, Portlaoise
	J Kavanagh, M Conway (0-02f) 0-03 each, J Doyle (0-02f), M O’Flaherty, S Johnston 0-02 each, E O’Flaherty (0-01f), A Smith, R Kelly, M Foley, E Bolton, P O’Neill, E Doyle 0-01 each.	Report	I Ryan 0-07 (0-05f), S Kelly, D Quaid, G Collins, E O’Connor, B Scanlon (0-01f) 0-01 each	Attendance: 11,345; Referee: Barry Cassidy (Derry)

21 July 2012 Round 3	Tipperary	0–10 – 0–08	Antrim	Semple Stadium, Thurles
	A Maloney 0-06 (3f), G Hannigan, D Leahy, M Quinlivan (1f), B Mulvihill 0-01 each	Report	J Loughrey, T McCann (1 ‘45’) 0-02 each, S McDonagh, M McCann, K Brady, M Magill 0-01 each	Attendance: 2,563; Referee: E Kinsella (Laois)

21 July 2012 Round 3	Leitrim	1–11 – 1–13	Laois	Páirc Seán Mac Diarmada, Carrick on Shannon
	E Mulligan 0-06 (6f), K Conlon 1-02, R Cox 0-02, C Clarke 0-01	Report	C Boyle 1-00, R Munnelly 0-03, C Kelly (1f), MJ Tierney (2f), C Begley 0-02 each, B Sheehan, P Clancy 0-01 each	Referee: Rory Hickey (Clare), Martin Higgins (Fermanagh)

==== Round 4 ====
28 July 2012 Round 4	Clare	1–06 – 2–22	Kerry	Gaelic Grounds, Limerick
19:00	D Russell 1-01, D Tubridy (3f) 0-03, G Quinlan 0-02	Report	C Cooper 1-04, J O'Donoghue 1-03, B Sheehan (4f) 0-04, K Donaghy 0-03, Declan O'Sullivan, K O'Leary 0-02 each, M Ó Sé, D Walsh, A Maher, P Galvin 0-01 each	Referee: Maurice Deegan (Laois)

28 July 2012 Round 4	Sligo	0–04 – 0–13	Kildare	Dr. Hyde Park, Roscommon
18:30	A Marren (2f) 0-02, D Maye (1f), E O’Hara 0-01 each	Report	E O’Flaherty (4f) 0-04, M Conway (2f), A Smith 0-02 each, T O’Connor, J Kavanagh, R Kelly, E Bolton, E Doyle 0-01 each	Referee: David Coldrick (Meath)

28 July 2012 Round 4	Down	1–13 – 0–11	Tipperary	Cusack Park, Mullingar
16:00	B Coulter 1-02, A Rogers (1f), M Poland (1f) 0-04 each, D Gordon, B McArdle, K Duffin (1f) 0-01 each	Report	A Maloney (2f), M Quinlivan (2f) 0-03 each, P Austin 0-02, B Fox, P Acheson, B Mulvihill 0-01 each	Referee: C Reilly (Meath)

28 July 2012 Round 4	Meath	1–12 – 1–15	Laois	O'Connor Park, Tullamore
15:30	P Byrne 1–0, B Farrell 0–8 (8f), S Bray (1f), G Reilly, M Burke, E Harrington 0–1 each	Report	R Munnelly (1pen, 1f) 1-04, P Clancy, C Kelly (1 ’45), MJ Tierney (1f) 0–2 each, D O’Connor, B Sheehan, C Begley, B Quigley, D Strong 0–1 each	Referee: Joe McQuillan (Cavan)

=== All-Ireland series ===
Quarter-finals
Cork	2–19
Kildare	0–12
Donegal	1–12
Kerry	1–10
Mayo	3–18
Down	2–09
Dublin	1–12
Laois	0–12

Semi-finals
Cork	1–11
Donegal	0–16
Mayo	0–19
Dublin	0–16

Final
Donegal	2–11
Mayo	0–13

==== Quarter-finals ====
4 August 2012
17:00
Quarter-final

Mayo	3–18 – 2–09	Down
M Conroy 2-01, J Doherty 1-00, C O’Connor (6f) 0-07, A Dillon 0-04, K McLoughlin 0-02, L Keegan, A O’Shea, A Moran, E Varley 0-01 each	Report	B Coulter 1-01, K King 1-00, A Carr (5f) 0-07, L Doyle (1f) 0-01

Croke Park, Dublin
Referee: Maurice Deegan (Laois)

4 August 2012
19:00
Quarter-final

Dublin	1–12 – 0–12	Laois
MD Macauley 1-00, B Brogan (3f) 0-04, S Cluxton (1f, 2 ’45) 0-03, P Flynn 0-02, E O’Gara, K Nolan, D Bastick 0-01 each	Report	R Munnelly (5f) 0-06, C Kelly (3f) 0-03, G Walsh 0-02, C Begley 0-01

Croke Park, Dublin
Referee: Cormac Reilly (Meath)

5 August 2012
14:00
Quarter-final

Cork	2–19 – 0–12	Kildare
C O’Neill (2f) 1-03, E Doyle o.g., D O’Connor 0–4 (1f, 2 ’45), A Walsh 0–3 (1f), P Kerrigan, D Goulding, P O’Neill, P Kissane 0-02 each, F Goold 0-01	Report	A Smith (1f) 0-04, J Doyle (1f) 0-03, H McGrillen, R Kelly, E O’Flaherty (f), M Conway (f), D Earley 0–1 each

Croke Park, Dublin
Referee: Joe McQuillan (Cavan)

5 August 2012
16:00
Quarter-final

Donegal	1–12 – 1–10	Kerry
C McFadden (1-00sl, 2f) 1-05, M Murphy (2f) 0-03, L McLoone, P McBrearty, C Toye, K Lacey 0-01 each	Report	C Cooper (2f) 0-04, K Donaghy 1-00, A Maher 0-02, B Sheehan (1f), Declan O’Sullivan, J O’Donoghue, P Galvin 0-01 each

Croke Park, Dublin
Referee: Marty Duffy (Sligo)

==== Semi-finals ====
26 August 2012
15:30
Semi-final

Cork	1–11 – 0–16	Donegal
C O’Neill 1-03, C Sheehan 0-03, P Kerrigan 0-02, D Goulding (f), P Kelly, A Walsh 0-01 each	Report	C McFadden (2f, 1 ’45) 0-05, M Murphy (3f) 0-03, K Lacey 0-02, M McHugh, A Thompson, F McGlynn, D Walsh, M McElhinney, R Kavanagh 0-01 each

Croke Park, Dublin
Attendance: 55,169
Referee: David Coldrick (Meath)

2 September 2012
15:30
Semi-final

Mayo	0–19 – 0–16	Dublin
C O’Connor (3 ’45, 3f) 0-07, A Dillon 0-03, K McLoughlin, E Varley (1f) 0-02 each, B Moran, M Conroy, R Feeney, S O’Shea, J Doherty 0-01 each	Report	B Brogan (6f) 0-06, C Kilkenny, S Cluxton (3 ’45) 0-03 each, D Connolly, P Flynn 0-02 each

Croke Park, Dublin
Attendance: 81,364
Referee: Joe McQuillan (Cavan)

==== Final ====
23 September 2012
Final

Donegal	2–11 – 0–13	Mayo
M Murphy (3f), C McFadden (3f) 1-04 each, R Bradley, N Gallagher, F McGlynn 0–1 each	Report	C O’Connor (5f) 0-05, E Varley (1f), K McLoughlin 0-02 each, L Keegan, M Conroy, R Feeney, J Gibbons 0-01 each

Croke Park, Dublin
Attendance: 82,269
Referee: Maurice Deegan (Laois)

== Stadia and locations ==
Team	Location	Stadium	Stadium capacity
Antrim	Belfast	Casement Park	32,500
Armagh	Armagh	Athletic Grounds	19,500
Carlow	Carlow	Dr Cullen Park	21,000
Cavan	Cavan	Kingspan Breffni Park	32,000
Clare	Ennis	Cusack Park	14,864
Cork	Cork	Páirc Uí Chaoimh	43,550
Derry	Derry	Celtic Park	22,000
Donegal	Ballybofey	MacCumhaill Park	12,500
Down	Newry	Páirc Esler	20,000
Dublin	Dublin	Parnell Park	13,500
Fermanagh	Enniskillen	Brewster Park	20,000
Galway	Galway	Pearse Stadium	26,197
Kerry	Killarney	Fitzgerald Stadium	43,180
Kildare	Newbridge	St Conleth's Park	6,200
Laois	Portlaoise	O'Moore Park	27,000
Leitrim	Carrick-on-Shannon	Páirc Seán Mac Diarmada	9,331
Limerick	Limerick	Gaelic Grounds	49,866
London	Ruislip	Emerald GAA Grounds	5,000
Longford	Longford	Pearse Park	10,000
Louth	Drogheda	Drogheda Park	7,000
Mayo	Castlebar	McHale Park	42,000
Meath	Navan	Páirc Tailteann	10,000
Monaghan	Clones	St Tiernach's Park	36,000
New York	Kingsbridge, Bronx	Gaelic Park	2,000
Offaly	Tullamore	O'Connor Park	20,000
Roscommon	Roscommon	Dr Hyde Park	18,500
Sligo	Sligo	Markievicz Park	18,558
Tipperary	Thurles	Semple Stadium	53,500
Tyrone	Omagh	Healy Park	26,500
Waterford	Waterford	Walsh Park	17,000
Westmeath	Mullingar	Cusack Park	11,000
Wexford	Wexford	Wexford Park	20,000
Wicklow	Aughrim	Aughrim County Ground	10,000

== Personnel and kits ==
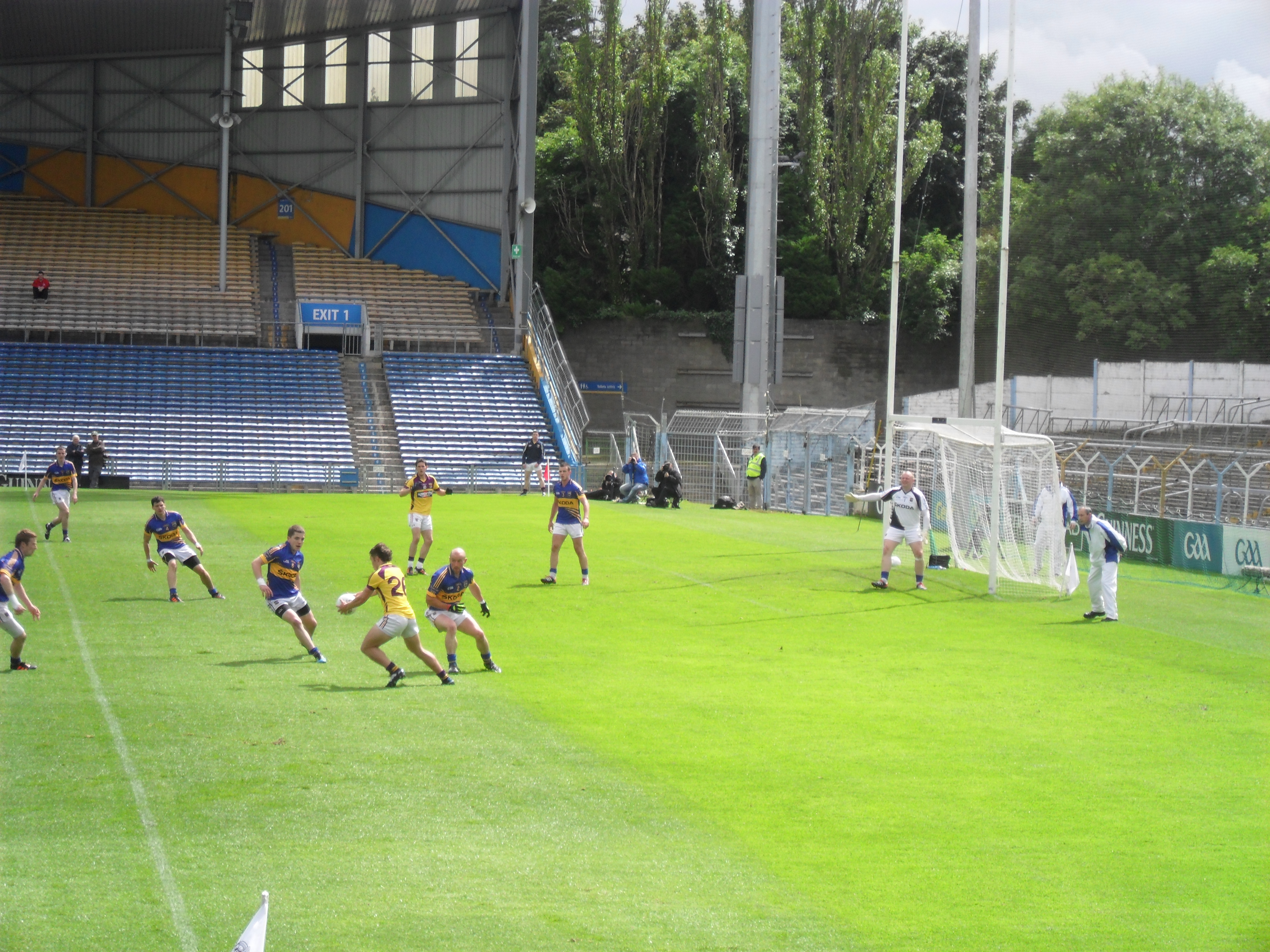
Qualifier round 2, 14 July 2012, Semple Stadium; Tipperary v. Wexford

Team	Colours	Sponsor	Captain	Manager(s)	Most recent success
Team	Colours	Sponsor	Captain	Manager(s)	All-Ireland	Provincial	League
Antrim	Saffron and white	Creagh Concrete	Aodhán Gallagher	Liam Bradley		1951
Armagh	Orange and white	Morgan Fuels	Ciarán McKeever	Paddy O'Rourke	2002	2008	2005
Carlow	Red, green and yellow	Dan Morrissey	Shane Redmond	Luke Dempsey		1944
Cavan	Blue and white	Kingspan	Pádraic O'Reilly	Val Andrews	1952	1997	1950
Clare	Saffron and blue	Pat O'Donnell	Alan Clohessy	Michael McDermott		1992
Cork	Red and white	O2	Graham Canty	Conor Counihan	2010	2012	2012
Derry	Red and white	Specialist Joinery Group	Paddy Bradley	John Brennan	1993	1998	2008
Donegal	Green and yellow	Donegal Creameries	Michael Murphy	Jim McGuinness	2012	2012	2007
Down	Red and black	Canal Court Hotel	Ambrose Rogers	James McCartan Jr.	1994	1994	1983
Dublin	Blue and navy	Vodafone	Bryan Cullen	Pat Gilroy	2011	2012	1993
Fermanagh	Green and white	Tracey Concrete	Ryan McCluskey	Peter Canavan
Galway	Maroon and white	Health Care West	Finian Hanley	Alan Mulholland	2001	2008	1981
Kerry	Green and gold	Kerry Group	Colm Cooper	Jack O'Connor	2009	2011	2009
Kildare	White	Tegal	Johnny Doyle	Kieran McGeeney	1928	2000
Laois	Blue and white	MW Hire Group	Kevin Meaney	Justin McNulty		2003	1986
Leitrim	Green and gold	Bush Hotel	Oaddy Maguire	Mickey Moran		1994
Limerick	Green and white	Sporting Limerick	Ger Collins	Maurice Horan	1896	1996
London	Green and white		Seán McVeigh	Paul Coggins
Longford	Blue and gold	Glennon	Paul Barden	Glenn Ryan		1968
Louth	Red and white	McCabe	Mark Brennan	Peter Fitzpatrick	1957	1957
Mayo	Green and red	Elverys Sports	Andy Moran	James Horan	1951	2012	2001
Meath	Green and gold	Comer Group	Shane McAnarney	Séamus McEnaney	1999	2010	1994
Monaghan	Blue and white	Investec	Darren Hughes	Eamonn McEneaney		1988	1985
New York	Red, white and blue	Premium Sports		Connie Molloy
Offaly	Green, white and gold	Carrol Cuisine	Brian Darby	Gerry Cooney	1982	1997	1998
Roscommon	Blue and primrose	Mayo Roscommon Hospice	Geoffrey Claffey	Des Newton	1944	2010	1979
Sligo	Black and white	Radisson Hotel and Spa	Ross Donovan	Kevin Walsh		2007
Tipperary	Blue and gold	Škoda	Philip Austin	Peter Creedon	1920	1935
Tyrone	White and Red	Target Express	Stephen O'Neill	Mickey Harte	2008	2010	2008
Waterford	Blue and white	3	John A. Murphy	John Owens		1898
Westmeath	Maroon and white	Annebrook House Hotel	Gary Connaughton	Pat Flanagan		2004
Wexford	Purple and gold	Sports Savers	David Murphy	Jason Ryan	1952	1997	1950
Wicklow	Blue and gold	Brennan Hotels	Leighton Glynn	Harry Murphy

== Referees ==
Ahead of the 2012 Championship, three referees joined the panel: Conor Lane of Banteer, Martin Higgins of Fermanagh and Barry Cassidy of Derry.

2012 Championship referees' panel

- Barry Cassidy (Derry)
- David Coldrick (Meath)
- Michael Collins (Cork)
- Maurice Deegan (Laois)
- Syl Doyle (Wexford)
- Marty Duffy (Sligo)
- Michael Duffy (Sligo)
- Derek Fahy (Longford)
- Rory Hickey (Clare)
- Martin Higgins (Fermanagh)
- Pádraig Hughes (Armagh)
- Eddie Kinsella (Laois)
- Conor Lane (Cork)
- Joe McQuillan (Cavan)
- Pádraig O'Sullivan (Kerry)
- Cormac Reilly (Meath)

== Statistics ==
=== Scoring ===
- First goal of the championship: Stephen Coen for Sligo against New York (Connacht quarter-final)
- Widest winning margin: 24 points
  - Sligo 3–21 – 0-06 New York (Connacht quarter-final)
- Most goals in a match: 5
  - Mayo 3–18 – 2-09 Down (All Ireland quarter-final)
- Most points in a match: 35
  - Mayo 0-19 – 0-16 Dublin (All Ireland Semi-final)
- Most goals by one team in a match: 4
  - Mayo 4–20 – 0–10 Leitrim (Connacht Semi-final)
- Highest aggregate score: 42 points
  - Mayo 4–20 – 0–10 Leitrim (Connacht Semi-final)
- Lowest aggregate score: 17 points
  - Sligo 0-04 – 0–13 Kildare (fourth round)
- Most goals scored by a losing team: 2
  - London 2-09 – 2–11 Antrim (first round)
  - Longford 0–17 – 2–8 Derry (first round)
  - Mayo 3–18 – 2–9 Down (All Ireland quarter-final)

=== Top scorers ===
Season

	Name	Team	Tally	Total	Games	Average
1	Colm McFadden	Donegal	4–32	44	7	6.3
1	Brian Farrell	Meath	0–37	37	6	6.2
3	Sean McCormack	Longford	0–33	33	5	6.6
4	Bernard Brogan	Dublin	3–23	32	5	6.4
5	Ian Ryan	Limerick	1–28	31	4	7.8
6	Colm Cooper	Kerry	1–25	28	4	7.0
7	Cillian O'Connor	Mayo	0–28	28	5	5.6
8	Emlyn Mulligan	Leitrim	0–24	24	4	8.0
9	Adrian Marren	Sligo	2–17	24	4	6.0
10	Mikey Conway	Kildare	2–16	22	6	3.7

Single game

	Name	Tally	Total	County		Opposition
1	Adrian Marren	2-06	12	Sligo	v	Galway
2	Sean McCormack	0–11	11	Longford	v	Derry
2	Bernard Brogan	2-05	11	Dublin	v	Louth
4	Ian Ryan	0–10	10	Limerick	v	Clare
4	Ian Ryan	1-07	10	Limerick	v	Waterford
4	Stephen Coen	2-04	10	Sligo	v	New York
7	Daniel Kille	0-09	9	Fermanagh	v	Cavan
7	Colm McFadden	1-06	9	Donegal	v	Cavan
9	Martin Penrose	0-08	8	Tyrone	v	Armagh
9	Darren Clarke	0-08	8	Louth	v	Dublin
9	Brian Farrell	0-08	8	Meath	v	Carlow
9	J. J. Smith	1-05	8	Carlow	v	Meath

=== Miscellaneous ===
- Sligo record an easiest ever championship win over New York.
- Clare beat Limerick for the first time since 1984.
- Cork played Clare in the Munster final for the first time since 1949.
- Donegal won a first All-Ireland title since 1992.

== Awards ==
Monthly

Month	Opel GAA/GPA Player of the Month	
Month	Player	County
May	Paul Barden	Longford
June	Adrian Marren	Sligo
July	Ryan Bradley	Donegal
August	Karl Lacey	Donegal
September	Michael Murphy	Donegal

Sunday Game Team of the Year

The Sunday Game team of the year was picked on 23 September, the night of the final and included 8 of Donegal's winning team.

GAA/GPA All Stars

Pos.	Player	Team	Appearances
GK	Paul Durcan	Donegal	1
RCB	Neil McGee	Donegal	2
FB	Ger Cafferkey	Mayo	1
LCB	Keith Higgins	Mayo	1
RWB	Lee Keegan	Mayo	1
CB	Karl Lacey^{FOTY}	Donegal	4
LWB	Frank McGlynn	Donegal	1
MD	Neil Gallagher	Donegal	1
MD	Aidan Walsh	Cork	2
RWF	Paul Flynn	Dublin	2
CF	Alan Dillon	Mayo	2
LWF	Mark McHugh	Donegal	1
RCF	Colm O'Neill	Cork	1
FF	Michael Murphy	Donegal	1
LCF	Colm McFadden	Donegal	1

Player has previously been selected.

County breakdown

- Donegal = 8
- Mayo = 4
- Cork = 2
- Dublin = 1

List of nominees

== See also ==
- 2012 All-Ireland Minor Football Championship
- 2012 National Football League (Ireland)
- "Jimmy's Winning Matches", a song
- Jimmy's Winnin' Matches, a documentary
