= 2014 National Football League (Ireland) =

Gaelic football competition

League details
- Dates: 1 February – 27 April 2014
- Teams: 32

League champions
- Winners: Dublin (10th win)
- Captain: Stephen Cluxton
- Manager: Jim Gavin

League runners-up
- Runners-up: Derry
- Captain: Mark Lynch
- Manager: Brian McIver

Other division winners
- Division 2: Monaghan
- Division 3: Roscommon
- Division 4: Tipperary

The 2014 National Football League known for sponsorship reasons as the Allianz National Football League was the 83rd staging of the National Football League (NFL), an annual Gaelic football tournament for the Gaelic Athletic Association county teams of Ireland. The League began on Saturday 1 February 2014. Thirty-one Gaelic football county teams from the island of Ireland, plus London, participated.

Dublin won their second title in a row and eleventh in total after a 3-19 to 1-10 win against Derry in the final on 27 April at Croke Park.

== Format ==
=== League structure ===
The 2014 format of the National Football League was a system of four divisions of eight teams. Each team played every other team in its division once, either home or away. 2 points were awarded for a win and 1 for a draw.

=== Tie-breaker ===
If only two teams were level on league points, then the following guidelines were in place to break the tie:

- The team that won the head-to-head match was ranked first
- If this game was a draw, score difference (total scored minus total conceded in all games) was used to rank the teams
- If score difference was identical, total scored was used to rank the teams
- If the two teams were still level, a play-off was required

If three or more teams were level on league points, points difference was used to rank the teams.

=== Finals, promotions and relegations ===
The top four teams in Division 1 contested the 2014 NFL semi-finals (first played fourth and second played third) and final. The top two teams in divisions 2, 3 and 4 were promoted, and contested the finals of their respective divisions. The bottom two teams in divisions 1, 2 and 3 were relegated.

== Division 1 ==
=== Table ===
Compete in Division 1 semi-finals
Automatic relegation to Division 2

Team	Pld	W	D	L	F	A	Diff	Pts
Cork	7	5	1	1	9-115	9-97	18	11
Derry	7	4	1	2	11-101	9-90	17	9
Mayo	7	4	1	2	14-106	14-91	15	9
Dublin	7	4	1	2	9-99	8-94	8	9
Tyrone	7	3	2	2	10-110	11-102	5	8
Kerry	7	3	0	4	10-93	6-94	11	6
Kildare	7	2	0	5	9-110	10-113	-6	4
Westmeath	7	0	0	7	5-72	10-125	-68	0

^{1}Derry, Mayo and Dublin are ranked by points difference.

=== Rounds 1 to 7 ===
01/02/14; Round 1	Derry	1-15 – 2-12	Tyrone	Celtic Park, Derry; Referee: J McQuillan
01/02/14; Round 1	M Lynch (0-4), E Lynn (0-3), C O'Boyle (1-0), C McFaul (0-2), J Kielt (0-2), A McAlynn (0-1), E McGuckin (0-1), F Doherty (0-1), G O'Kane (0-1)	Report	D McCurry (1-4), C Grugan (1-1), N Morgan (0-3), R O'Neill (0-2), M Donnelly (0-1), S McGuigan (0-1)	Celtic Park, Derry; Referee: J McQuillan

01/02/14; Round 1	Dublin	2-8 – 1-10	Kerry	Croke Park, Dublin; Referee: D Coldrick (Meath)
01/02/14; Round 1	Kevin McManamon 1-1, Eoghan O’Gara 1-0, Shane Carthy (0-1f), Cormac Costello (0-2f), Paul Mannion (0-2f) 0-2 each, Jack McCaffrey 0-1	Report	James O'Donoghue 1-3, Barry John Keane 0-4 (0-3f), Stephen O'Brien 0-2, David Moran (1 '45)	Croke Park, Dublin; Referee: D Coldrick (Meath)

02/02/14; Round 1	Cork	0-18 – 0-10	Westmeath	Páirc Uí Rinn, Cork; Referee: P O'Sullivan
02/02/14; Round 1	D Goulding (0-7), A Walsh (0-3), M Collins (0-2), B Hurley (0-1), B O'Driscoll (0-1), D Og Hodnett (0-1), F Goold (0-1), J Loughrey (0-1), J O'Rourke (0-1)	Report	J Heslin (0-4), G Egan (0-2), K Martin (0-2), J Egan (0-1), R Connellan (0-1)	Páirc Uí Rinn, Cork; Referee: P O'Sullivan

02/02/14; Round 1	Kildare	2-19 – 2-18	Mayo	St Conleth's Park, Newbridge; Referee: R Hickey
02/02/14; Round 1	P Brophy (0-6), E O'Flaherty (1-2), T O'Connor (1-1), C McNally (0-3), D Mulhall (0-3), D Hyland (0-1), H McGrillen (0-1), P Cribbin (0-1), S Hurley (0-1)	Report	K McLoughlin (0-8), A Gallagher (0-3), R Hennelly (0-3), D Coen (1-0), J Gibbons (1-0), A O'Shea (0-1), D O'Connor (0-1), L Keegan (0-1), S McHale (0-1)	St Conleth's Park, Newbridge; Referee: R Hickey

09/02/14; Round 2	Cork	0-16 – 1-12	Kildare	Páirc Uí Rinn, Cork; Referee: E Kinsella
09/02/14; Round 2	J O'Rourke (0-3), B Hurley (0-2), C Vaughan (0-2), D Goulding (0-2), D O'Connor (0-2), D Og Hodnett (0-2), M Collins (0-2), J Loughrey (0-1)	Report	C McNally (1-2), D Mulhall (0-4), E O'Flaherty (0-2), K Murnaghan (0-1), P Brophy (0-1), S Hurley (0-1), T O'Connor (0-1)	Páirc Uí Rinn, Cork; Referee: E Kinsella

09/02/14; Round 2	Kerry	0-14 – 0-16	Derry	Austin Stack Park, Tralee; Referee: C Lane
09/02/14; Round 2	C Cox (0-7), B J Keane (0-3), J Lyne (0-1), J O'Donoghue (0-1), J Sherwood (0-1), S O'Brien (0-1)	Report	M Lynch (0-4), E McGuckin (0-3), E Lynn (0-2), J Kielt (0-2), S L McGoldrick (0-2), B Heron (0-1), C McGoldrick (0-1), K Johnston (0-1)	Austin Stack Park, Tralee; Referee: C Lane

09/02/14; Round 2	Tyrone	2-15 – 0-15	Mayo	Healy Park, Omagh; Referee: P Hughes
09/02/14; Round 2	D McCurry (2-4), Mattie Donnelly (0-5), C McGinley (0-2), C McAliskey (0-1), N Morgan (0-1), P Harte (0-1), R O'Neill (0-1)	Report	A Gallagher (0-9), K McLoughlin (0-2), A Moran (0-1), C Carolan (0-1), K Higgins (0-1), L Keegan (0-1)	Healy Park, Omagh; Referee: P Hughes

09/02/14; Round 2	Westmeath	1-7 – 0-14	Dublin	Cusack Park, Mullingar; Attendance: 6,500; Referee: D Gough; Man of the Match: Ciaran Kilkenny
09/02/14; Round 2	John Heslin 0-5 (0-3f), Dessie Dolan 1-0, Kieran Martin and Ray Connellan 0-1 each	Report	Paul Hudson 0-4, Stephen Cluxton (3 '45) and Ciaran Kilkenny (0-3f) 0-3 each, Ciaran Reddin 0-2, Kevin McManamon and Davey Byrne 0-1 each	Cusack Park, Mullingar; Attendance: 6,500; Referee: D Gough; Man of the Match: Ciaran Kilkenny

01/03/14; Round 3	Dublin	0-18 – 1-17	Cork	Croke Park, Dublin; Referee: P Hughes
01/03/14; Round 3	C Costello (0-4), C Kilkenny (0-3), K McManamon (0-3), S Cluxton (0-3), C Reddin (0-2), J McCaffrey (0-1), P Hudson (0-1), S Carthy (0-1)	Report	D Goulding (0-7), J Hayes (1-3), C O'Neill (0-2), D Og Hodnett (0-2), B Hurley (0-1), F Goold (0-1), P Kerrigan (0-1)	Croke Park, Dublin; Referee: P Hughes

02/03/14; Round 3	Derry	3-16 – 0-12	Westmeath	Owenbeg Derry GAA Centre, Owenbeg; Referee: M Duffy
02/03/14; Round 3	M Lynch (0-6), C O'Boyle (1-1), E McGuckin (1-1), B Heron (1-0), C McFaul (0-2), E Lynn (0-2), J Kielt (0-2), K Johnston (0-1), S L McGoldrick (0-1)	Report	J Heslin (0-7), G Egan (0-2), D Dolan (0-1), J Dolan (0-1), K Martin (0-1)	Owenbeg Derry GAA Centre, Owenbeg; Referee: M Duffy

02/03/14; Round 3	Kildare	1-21 – 3-16	Tyrone	St Conleth's Park, Newbridge; Referee: P O'Sullivan
02/03/14; Round 3	E O'Flaherty (0-6), D Mulhall (0-5), P Brophy (0-3), T O'Connor (1-0), C McNally (0-2), S Hurley (0-2), M O'Grady (0-1), P Cribbin (0-1), T Moolick (0-1)	Report	R O'Neill (1-5), E McKenna (1-2), Mark Donnelly (1-1), Mattie Donnelly (0-3), C McAliskey (0-2), D McCurry (0-1), N Morgan (0-1), S Cavanagh (0-1)	St Conleth's Park, Newbridge; Referee: P O'Sullivan

02/03/14; Round 3	Mayo	2-15 – 1-13	Kerry	MacHale Park, Castlebar; Referee: C Brannigan
02/03/14; Round 3	A Freeman (1-5), K McLoughlin (0-4), J Doherty (1-1), A Gallagher (0-2), E Varley (0-1), L Keegan (0-1), M Conroy (0-1)	Report	S O'Brien (1-2), C Cox (0-4), J O'Donoghue (0-3), B J Keane (0-2), D Moran (0-1), D Walsh (0-1)	MacHale Park, Castlebar; Referee: C Brannigan

08/03/14; Round 4	Dublin	1-22 – 1-12	Kildare	Croke Park, Dublin; Referee: Marty Duffy
08/03/14; Round 4	K McManamon (0-8), P Andrews (1-2), C O'Sullivan (0-2), E O'Gara (0-2), J Cooper (0-2), S Cluxton (0-2), B Cullen (0-1), D Byrne (0-1), D Nelson (0-1), T Brady (0-1)	Report	D Mulhall (1-6), E O'Flaherty (0-2), M Conway (0-1), P Brophy (0-1), P Cribbin (0-1), P Fogarty (0-1)	Croke Park, Dublin; Referee: Marty Duffy

09/03/14; Round 4	Cork	2-18 – 3-14	Derry	Páirc Uí Rinn, Cork; Referee: M Deegan
09/03/14; Round 4	J O'Rourke (1-2), B Hurley (0-3), C O'Neill (0-3), D Goulding (0-3), P Kerrigan (0-3), T Clancy (1-0), M Collins (0-2), B O'Driscoll (0-1), F Goold (0-1)	Report	E Lynn (2-1), M Lynch (0-5), E McGuckin (1-0), C McFaul (0-2), F Doherty (0-2), B Heron (0-1), C McKaigue (0-1), M Craig (0-1), SL McGoldrick (0-1)	Páirc Uí Rinn, Cork; Referee: M Deegan

09/03/14; Round 4	Kerry	3-15 – 0-9	Tyrone	Fitzgerald Stadium, Killarney; Referee: R Hickey
09/03/14; Round 4	J O'Donoghue (3-3), B Sheehan (0-8), A Maher (0-1), B J Keane (0-1), K O'Leary (0-1), P Geaney (0-1)	Report	D McCurry (0-2), N Morgan (0-2), P Harte (0-2), R O'Neill (0-2), C McGinley (0-1)	Fitzgerald Stadium, Killarney; Referee: R Hickey

09/03/14; Round 4	Westmeath	3-9 – 2-17	Mayo	Cusack Park, Mullingar; Referee: E Kinsella
09/03/14; Round 4	J Dolan (2-2), J Heslin (0-5), K Martin (1-1), D Dolan (0-1)	Report	A Freeman (0-5), L Keegan (1-2), K McLoughlin (0-3), M Sweeney (1-0), A O'Shea (0-2), B Gallagher (0-2), C O'Connor (0-1), D Drake (0-1), E Varley (0-1)	Cusack Park, Mullingar; Referee: E Kinsella

16/03/14; Round 5	Derry	1-16 – 0-13	Dublin	Celtic Park, Derry; Referee: F Kelly
16/03/14; Round 5	M Lynch (1-8), B Heron (0-2), C McFaul (0-2), F Doherty (0-2), C O'Boyle (0-1), D Mullan (0-1)	Report	A Brogan (0-6), P Andrews (0-2), P Hudson (0-2), J Whelan (0-1), M D Macauley (0-1), P McMahon (0-1)	Celtic Park, Derry; Referee: F Kelly

16/03/14; Round 5	Kildare	0-15 – 2-15	Kerry	St Conleth's Park, Newbridge; Referee: J McQuillan
16/03/14; Round 5	P Brophy (0-3), D Mulhall (0-2), E O'Flaherty (0-2), S Hurley (0-2), C McNally (0-1), K Murnaghan (0-1), M Conway (0-1), P Cribbin (0-1), P Fogarty (0-1), T O'Connor (0-1)	Report	J O'Donoghue (1-5), P Geaney (1-1), D Casey (0-3), B Sheehan (0-2), S O'Brien (0-2), J Lyne (0-1), P Murphy (0-1)	St Conleth's Park, Newbridge; Referee: J McQuillan

16/03/14; Round 5	Mayo	4-12 – 2-14	Cork	MacHale Park, Castlebar; Referee: R Hickey
16/03/14; Round 5	J Doherty (1-3), C O'Connor (1-2), K McLoughlin (0-4), J Gibbons (1-1), A Freeman (1-0), A O'Shea (0-1), L Keegan (0-1)	Report	B Hurley (1-5), A Walsh (0-3), D O'Connor (0-3), J O'Rourke (1-0), C O'Neill (0-1), J Hayes (0-1), M Collins (0-1)	MacHale Park, Castlebar; Referee: R Hickey

16/03/14; Round 5	Tyrone	2-23 – 1-12	Westmeath	Healy Park, Omagh; Referee: B Cassidy
16/03/14; Round 5	C McAliskey (0-5), S Cavanagh (1-2), C McGinley (0-4), K Coney (0-3), N Morgan (0-3), R O'Neill (1-0), Mark Donnelly (0-2), C Cavanagh (0-1), C Grugan (0-1), D McBride (0-1), S McGuigan (0-1)	Report	D Glennon (0-5), R Connellan (1-1), D Dolan (0-2), G Egan (0-2), C McCormack (0-1), K Martin (0-1)	Healy Park, Omagh; Referee: B Cassidy

29/03/14; Round 6	Dublin	3-14 – 2-17	Mayo	Croke Park, Dublin; Referee: C Reilly
29/03/14; Round 6	E O'Gara (2-0), K McManamon (1-2), C Costello (0-4), A Brogan (0-2), D Connolly (0-2), J Whelan (0-1), P Andrews (0-1), P Flynn (0-1), S Cluxton (0-1)	Report	C O'Connor (0-8), K McLoughlin (1-3), M Sweeney (1-1), D Vaughan (0-2), A Moran (0-1), J Gibbons (0-1), K Higgins (0-1)	Croke Park, Dublin; Referee: C Reilly

30/03/14; Round 6	Cork	2-14 – 0-20	Tyrone	Páirc Uí Rinn, Cork; Referee: D Coldrick
30/03/14; Round 6	B Hurley (0-5), C O'Neill (1-2), P Kerrigan (1-0), J Hayes (0-2), J O'Rourke (0-2), Barry O'Driscoll (0-1), C O'Driscoll (0-1), M Shields (0-1)	Report	K Coney (0-9), D McCurry (0-4), N Morgan (0-2), C McAliskey (0-1), M Penrose (0-1), P Harte (0-1), R O'Neill (0-1), S Cavanagh (0-1)	Páirc Uí Rinn, Cork; Referee: D Coldrick

30/03/14; Round 6	Derry	2-17 – 3-9	Kildare	Owenbeg Derry GAA Centre, Owenbeg; Referee: P Hughes
30/03/14; Round 6	M Lynch (1-6), C O'Boyle (1-2), B Heron (0-2), E Lynn (0-2), E McGuckin (0-2), C Kielt (0-1), C McFaul (0-1), SL McGoldrick (0-1)	Report	T Moolick (1-2), K Cribbin (1-1), E Callaghan (1-0), F Dowling (0-2), H Lynch (0-1), J Doyle (0-1), M Conway (0-1), P O'Neill (0-1)	Owenbeg Derry GAA Centre, Owenbeg; Referee: P Hughes

30/03/14; Round 6	Westmeath	0-13 – 2-15	Kerry	Cusack Park, Mullingar; Referee: A Nolan
30/03/14; Round 6	C McCormack (0-3), D Glennon (0-3), G Egan (0-2), K Martin (0-2), R Connellan (0-2), P Sharry (0-1)	Report	P Geaney (1-4), J O'Donoghue (0-5), K O'Leary (1-0), B Sheehan (0-2), D Moran (0-1), D Walsh (0-1), P Crowley (0-1), S O'Brien (0-1)	Cusack Park, Mullingar; Referee: A Nolan

06/04/14; Round 7	Kerry	1-11 – 2-18	Cork	Austin Stack Park, Tralee; Referee: E Kinsella
06/04/14; Round 7	P Geaney (1-2), J O'Donoghue (0-4), B Sheehan (0-1), D Casey (0-1), D Moran (0-1), P Crowley (0-1), S O'Brien (0-1)	Report	B Hurley (0-8), P Kerrigan (1-3), C O'Neill (1-0), J Hayes (0-2), C O'Driscoll (0-1), D Cahalane (0-1), D Goulding (0-1), D O'Connor (0-1), F Goold (0-1)	Austin Stack Park, Tralee; Referee: E Kinsella

06/04/14; Round 7	Kildare	1-22 – 0-9	Westmeath	St Conleth's Park, Newbridge; Referee: D O'Mahony
06/04/14; Round 7	D Mulhall (0-7), N Kelly (0-5), C McNally (1-1), S Hurley (0-3), P O'Neill (0-2), E Callaghan (0-1), F Conway (0-1), F Dowling (0-1), P Brophy (0-1)	Report	D Glennon (0-4), G Egan (0-3), A Giles (0-1), C McCormack (0-1)	St Conleth's Park, Newbridge; Referee: D O'Mahony

06/04/14; Round 7	Mayo	2-12 – 1-7	Derry	MacHale Park, Castlebar; Referee: D Coldrick
06/04/14; Round 7	A Freeman (2-6), M Sweeney (0-2), A Moran (0-1), D Coen (0-1), D Vaughan (0-1), T Parsons (0-1)	Report	E McGuckin (1-1), A McAlynn (0-2), A Kerrigan (0-1), C Kielt (0-1), E Bradley (0-1), N McFeely (0-1)	MacHale Park, Castlebar; Referee: D Coldrick

06/04/14; Round 7	Tyrone	1-15 – 3-10	Dublin	Healy Park, Omagh; Referee: Marty Duffy
06/04/14; Round 7	D McCurry (0-6), P Harte (1-1), N Morgan (0-3), R O'Neill (0-2), Mark Donnelly (0-1), Mattie Donnelly (0-1), S Cavanagh (0-1)	Report	D Connolly (0-5), J Whelan (1-1), J McCarthy (1-0), MD Macauley (1-0), A Brogan (0-1), B Cullen (0-1), K McManamon (0-1), P McMahon (0-1)	Healy Park, Omagh; Referee: Marty Duffy

=== Division 1 Semi-finals ===
13/04/14	Cork	2-13 - 2-20	Dublin	Croke Park, Dublin; Referee: C Branagan
13/04/14	B Hurley (0-5), C O'Neill (1-1), M Collins (1-1), D Goulding (0-2), D O'Connor (0-1), F Goold (0-1), J Loughrey (0-1), P Kelly (0-1)	Report	B Brogan (0-5), D Connolly (1-2), MD Macauley (1-1), E O'Gara (0-3), P Andrews (0-3), A Brogan (0-1), C Reddin (0-1), D Byrne (0-1), J Cooper (0-1), K McManamon (0-1), P Flynn (0-1)	Croke Park, Dublin; Referee: C Branagan

13/04/14	Derry	2-15 – 1-16	Mayo	Croke Park, Dublin; Referee: P Hughes
13/04/14	M Lynch (0-9), C O'Boyle (1-1), K Johnston (1-0), C McFaul (0-1), E Bradley (0-1), E Lynn (0-1), E McGuckin (0-1), SL McGoldrick (0-1)	Report	A Freeman (0-6), A Moran (1-1), J Doherty (0-2), M Sweeney (0-2), A O'Shea (0-1), E Varley (0-1), J Gibbons (0-1), K Higgins (0-1), L Keegan (0-1)	Croke Park, Dublin; Referee: P Hughes

=== Division 1 Final ===
27/04/14; 4:00 p.m.	Derry	1-10 – 3-19	Dublin	Croke Park, Dublin; Attendance: 38,841; Referee: C Reilly; Man of the Match: Bernard Brogan
27/04/14; 4:00 p.m.	C O'Boyle (1-1), E McGuckin (0-2), G O'Kane (0-2), M Lynch (0-2), E Bradley (0-1), F Doherty (0-1), K Johnston (0-1)	Report	B Brogan (1-6), D Connolly (1-2), P Flynn (0-3), K McManamon (1-0), A Brogan (0-2), E O'Gara (0-2), C Reddin (0-1), D Nelson (0-1), J Cooper (0-1), S Cluxton (0-1)	Croke Park, Dublin; Attendance: 38,841; Referee: C Reilly; Man of the Match: Bernard Brogan

== Division 2 ==
=== Table ===
Compete in Division 2 final
Automatic relegation to Division 3

Team	Pld	W	D	L	F	A	Diff	Pts
Donegal	7	5	1	1	9-97	7-67	36	11
Monaghan	7	5	1	1	3-107	3-78	29	11
Meath	7	4	1	2	9-87	8-95	-5	9
Down	7	3	1	3	11-72	5-80	10	7
Laois	7	3	0	4	7-89	6-100	-8	6
Galway	7	2	1	4	7-84	8-97	-16	5
Armagh	7	2	1	4	7-86	10-86	-9	5
Louth	7	0	2	5	6-76	12-95	-37	2

^{1}Donegal are placed ahead of Monaghan because they won the head-to-head game between the teams (2-11 to 0-10).

^{2}Galway are placed ahead of Armagh because they won the head-to-head game between the teams (2-14 to 1-13).

=== Rounds 1 to 7 ===
02/02/14; Round 1	Down	1-11 – 0-14	Monaghan	Páirc Esler, Newry; Referee: C Reilly
02/02/14; Round 1	D O'Hare (0-4), C Maginn (1-0), J Johnston (0-2), C Garvey (0-1), D O'Hanlon (0-1), E McCartan (0-1), R Boyle (0-1), R Johnston (0-1)		J McCarron (0-7), C McManus (0-2), T Kerr (0-2), P Finlay (0-1), R Beggan (0-1), C McGuinness (0-1)	Páirc Esler, Newry; Referee: C Reilly

02/02/14; Round 1	Laois	1-9 – 2-19	Donegal	O'Moore Park, Portlaoise; Referee: C Lane
02/02/14; Round 1	J O'Loughlin (1-1), R Munnelly (0-3), D Kingston (0-2), D Conway (0-1), E O'Carroll (0-1), P O'Leary (0-1)		M Murphy (0-6), C McFadden (1-3), O MacNiallais (1-1), H McFadden (0-2), M McElhinney (0-2), A Thompson (0-1), C Toye (0-1), D Molloy (0-1), M McHugh (0-1), P McBrearty (0-1)	O'Moore Park, Portlaoise; Referee: C Lane

02/02/14; Round 1	Louth	0-16 – 1-13	Armagh	Drogheda Park, Drogheda; Referee: Marty Duffy
02/02/14; Round 1	C Judge (0-4), D Byrne (0-3), P Keenan (0-3), B Donnelly (0-2), D Maguire (0-2), A McDonnell (0-1), E O'Connor (0-1)		J Clarke (0-3), S Campbell (0-3), S Forker (1-0), E Rafferty (0-2), T Kernan (0-2), C McKeever (0-1), O McKeever (0-1), R Grugan (0-1)	Drogheda Park, Drogheda; Referee: Marty Duffy

02/02/14; Round 1	Meath	3-18 – 4-11	Galway	Páirc Tailteann, Navan; Referee: M Higgins
02/02/14; Round 1	M Newman (1-2), C O'Sullivan (1-1), G Reilly (0-3), S Bray (1-0), A Tormey (0-2), E Wallace (0-2), B Menton (0-1), D Bray (0-1), D Carroll (0-1), D Keogan (0-1), D Larkin (0-1), M Burke (0-1), P Gilsenan (0-1), S O'Rourke (0-1)		G Sice (1-2), S Armstrong (1-2), P Conroy (0-4), M Martin (1-1), T Flynn (1-0), A Varley (0-1), J Kavanagh (0-1)	Páirc Tailteann, Navan; Referee: M Higgins

07/02/14; Round 2	Armagh	2-5 – 2-7	Down	Athletic Grounds, Armagh; Referee: D Coldrick
07/02/14; Round 2	K Dyas (1-0), S Harold (1-0), C Rafferty (0-1), J Clarke (0-1), R Tasker (0-1), S Campbell (0-1), T Kernan (0-1)		M Poland (2-0), D O'Hare (0-2), K McKernan (0-2), C Maginn (0-1), E McCartan (0-1), N Madine (0-1)	Athletic Grounds, Armagh; Referee: D Coldrick

09/02/14; Round 2	Galway	0-12 – 1-16	Donegal	Pearse Stadium, Salthill; Referee: F Kelly
09/02/14; Round 2	E Concannon (0-3), P Conroy (0-3), G Sice (0-2), D Cummins (0-1), M Martin (0-1), P Varley (0-1), S Armstrong (0-1)		C McFadden (1-4), M Murphy (0-4), P McBrearty (0-3), D Molloy (0-2), D Walsh (0-1), O MacNiallais (0-1), R McHugh (0-1)	Pearse Stadium, Salthill; Referee: F Kelly

09/02/14; Round 2	Louth	0-11 – 2-8	Laois	Drogheda Park, Drogheda; Referee: C Reilly
09/02/14; Round 2	C Judge (0-3), D Byrne (0-3), A McDonnell (0-2), E O'Connor (0-2), D Maguire (0-1)		R Munnelly (1-2), D Kingston (0-3), C Meredith (1-0), G Walsh (0-2), J Finn (0-1)	Drogheda Park, Drogheda; Referee: C Reilly

09/02/14; Round 2	Monaghan	0-20 – 0-8	Meath	St Tiernach's Park, Clones; Referee: C Brannigan
09/02/14; Round 2	C McManus (0-7), J McCarron (0-5), R Beggan (0-3), C McGuinness (0-2), T Kerr (0-2), F Kelly (0-1)		M Newman (0-2), C O'Sullivan (0-1), D Bray (0-1), D Larkin (0-1), E Harrington (0-1), S Bray (0-1), S O'Rourke (0-1)	St Tiernach's Park, Clones; Referee: C Brannigan

01/03/14; Round 3	Down	4-16 – 0-9	Louth	Páirc Esler, Newry; Referee: M Higgins
01/03/14; Round 3	D O'Hare (1-10), B Coulter (2-0), C Maginn (1-0), N Madine (0-2), J Johnston (0-1), K McKernan (0-1), M Poland (0-1), P Fitzpatrick (0-1)		D Byrne (0-3), B White (0-2), C Judge (0-2), D Clarke (0-2)	Páirc Esler, Newry; Referee: M Higgins

01/03/14; Round 3	Laois	1-20 – 0-8	Galway	O'Moore Park, Portlaoise; Referee: A Nolan
01/03/14; Round 3	D Kingston (0-5), R Munnelly (0-4), K Meaney (1-1), G Walsh (0-3), D Strong (0-2), A Ryan (0-1), B Sheehan (0-1), D Conway (0-1), J Finn (0-1), J O'Loughlin (0-1)		P Conroy (0-2), S Armstrong (0-2), A Varley (0-1), E Concannon (0-1), E Hoare (0-1), G O'Donnell (0-1)	O'Moore Park, Portlaoise; Referee: A Nolan

01/03/14; Round 3	Meath	2-10 – 0-19	Armagh	Páirc Tailteann, Navan; Referee: M Deegan
01/03/14; Round 3	M Newman (1-3), B McMahon (1-2), E Wallace (0-2), G Reilly (0-2), S O'Rourke (0-1)		J Clarke (0-11), C Rafferty (0-2), S Campbell (0-2), S Harold (0-2), E McVerry (0-1), O McKeever (0-1)	Páirc Tailteann, Navan; Referee: M Deegan

02/03/14; Round 3	Donegal	2-11 – 0-10	Monaghan	O'Donnell Park, Letterkenny; Referee: B Cassidy
02/03/14; Round 3	O MacNiallais (1-3), C McFadden (1-2), P McBrearty (0-2), D Walsh (0-1), M McElhinney (0-1), M Murphy (0-1), R Kavanagh (0-1)		C McManus (0-5), J McCarron (0-2), D Mone (0-1), F Kelly (0-1), R Beggan (0-1)	O'Donnell Park, Letterkenny; Referee: B Cassidy

08/03/14; Round 4	Armagh	2-18 – 1-12	Laois	Athletic Grounds, Armagh; Referee: J McQuillan
08/03/14; Round 4	S Campbell (1-4), T Kernan (0-6), E Rafferty (1-1), A Mallon (0-1), C Rafferty (0-1), E McVerry (0-1), J Clarke (0-1), P Hughes (0-1), S Forker (0-1), S Harold (0-1)		D Kingston (0-5), J O'Loughlin (1-1), G Walsh (0-2), R Munnelly (0-2), D Conway (0-1), J Finn (0-1)	Athletic Grounds, Armagh; Referee: J McQuillan

09/03/14; Round 4	Donegal	1-12 – 1-12	Meath	MacCumhail Park, Ballybofey; Referee: P Hughes
09/03/14; Round 4	M Murphy (0-6), C McFadden (0-3), F McGlynn (1-0), C Toye (0-2), D Molloy (0-1)		M Newman (1-4), A Tormey (0-2), D Carroll (0-2), B McMahon (0-1), E Wallace (0-1), G Reilly (0-1), S O'Rourke (0-1)	MacCumhail Park, Ballybofey; Referee: P Hughes

09/03/14; Round 4	Galway	1-12 – 0-8	Down	St Jarlath's Park, Tuam; Referee: D O'Mahoney
09/03/14; Round 4	E Hoare (0-3), M Martin (0-3), D Cummins (1-0), J Kavanagh (0-2), G Sice (0-1), P Varley (0-1), S Armstrong (0-1), T Flynn (0-1)		D O'Hare (0-6), K McKernan (0-2)	St Jarlath's Park, Tuam; Referee: D O'Mahoney

09/03/14; Round 4	Monaghan	2-14 – 0-12	Louth	St Tiernach's Park, Clones; Referee: S Hurson
09/03/14; Round 4	C McManus (0-7), G Doogan (1-1), J McCarron (0-3), D Malone (1-0), C McGuinness (0-1), D Mone (0-1), R Beggan (0-1)		B White (0-5), C Judge (0-4), D Crilly (0-1), K Rogers (0-1), P Keenan (0-1)	St Tiernach's Park, Clones; Referee: S Hurson

15/03/14; Round 5	Armagh	0-10 – 1-17	Monaghan	Athletic Grounds, Armagh; Referee: D Gough
15/03/14; Round 5	J Clarke (0-3), C Rafferty (0-2), E McVerry (0-2), B Mallon (0-1), S Harold (0-1), T Kernan (0-1)		C McManus (0-7), J McCarron (0-6), D Hughes (1-0), D Mone (0-1), K Hughes (0-1), O Lennon (0-1), P Donaghy (0-1)	Athletic Grounds, Armagh; Referee: D Gough

15/03/14; Round 5	Laois	1-10 – 0-15	Meath	O'Moore Park, Portlaoise; Referee: M Collins
15/03/14; Round 5	R Munnelly (1-2), D Kingston (0-3), D Strong (0-2), E O'Carroll (0-1), G Walsh (0-1), MJ Tierney (0-1)		M Newman (0-6), S O'Rourke (0-4), A Tormey (0-1), B McMahon (0-1), B Menton (0-1), D Bray (0-1), G Reilly (0-1)	O'Moore Park, Portlaoise; Referee: M Collins

16/03/14; Round 5	Down	1-9 – 0-10	Donegal	Páirc Esler, Newry; Referee: C O'Hagan
16/03/14; Round 5	N Madine (1-1), C Garvey (0-2), D O'Hare (0-2), M Poland (0-2), C Laverty (0-1), K McKernan (0-1)		M Murphy (0-3), C McFadden (0-2), D Molloy (0-2), L McLoone (0-1), M McElhinney (0-1), N Gallagher (0-1)	Páirc Esler, Newry; Referee: C O'Hagan

16/03/14; Round 5	Louth	2-9 – 0-15	Galway	Drogheda Park, Drogheda; Referee: N Mooney
16/03/14; Round 5	P Keenan (1-2), B White (0-3), D Crilly (1-0), A McDonnell (0-2), C Judge (0-1), D Byrne (0-1)		P Conroy (0-4), M Martin (0-3), S Armstrong (0-3), E Hoare (0-2), G Bradshaw (0-2), J Duane (0-1)	Drogheda Park, Drogheda; Referee: N Mooney

29/03/14; Round 6	Meath	1-14 – 1-11	Down	Páirc Tailteann, Navan; Referee: P O'Sullivan
29/03/14; Round 6	G Reilly (1-2), S Bray (0-3), A Tormey (0-2), D Carroll (0-2), S O'Rourke (0-2), B Menton (0-1), M Newman (0-1), S Kenny (0-1)		D O'Hare (0-8), A Rodgers (1-0), J Johnston (0-1), M Poland (0-1), N Madine (0-1)	Páirc Tailteann, Navan; Referee: P O'Sullivan

30/03/14; Round 6	Donegal	1-19 – 3-7	Louth	Fr Tierney Park, Ballyshannon; Referee: M Higgins
30/03/14; Round 6	C McFadden (0-7), M Murphy (0-4), C Toye (0-3), David Walsh (1-0), R Kavanagh (0-2), A Thompson (0-1), D Molloy (0-1), Declan Walsh (0-1)		B White (1-3), P Keenan (2-0), S Lennon (0-3), B Duffy (0-1)	Fr Tierney Park, Ballyshannon; Referee: M Higgins

30/03/14; Round 6	Galway	2-14 – 1-13	Armagh	Pearse Stadium, Salthill; Referee: D Fahy
30/03/14; Round 6	S Armstrong (0-5), E Hoare (1-1), M Martin (1-1), P Conroy (0-3), J Kavanagh (0-2), M Farragher (0-1), T Flynn (0-1)		T Kernan (1-3), K Dyas (0-3), E McVerry (0-2), R Grugan (0-2), A Kernan (0-1), F Moriarty (0-1), J Clarke (0-1)	Pearse Stadium, Salthill; Referee: D Fahy

30/03/14; Round 6	Monaghan	0-19 – 0-14	Laois	St Tiernach's Park, Clones; Referee: B Cassidy
30/03/14; Round 6	C McManus (0-6), K Hughes (0-4), D Mone (0-2), S Gollogly (0-2), D Clerkin (0-1), F Kelly (0-1), G Doogan (0-1), M McElroy (0-1), P Finlay (0-1)		D Strong (0-4), R Munnelly (0-3), B Sheehan (0-1), C Meredith (0-1), D Conway (0-1), D Kingston (0-1), D O'Connor (0-1), G Walsh (0-1), J O'Loughlin (0-1)	St Tiernach's Park, Clones; Referee: B Cassidy

06/04/14; Round 7	Armagh	1-8 – 2-10	Donegal	Athletic Grounds, Armagh; Referee: F Kelly
06/04/14; Round 7	J Clarke (1-1), T Kernan (0-3), A Kernan (0-1), G McCooey (0-1), K Carragher (0-1), R Tasker (0-1)		C McFadden (0-6), M Murphy (2-0), P McBrearty (0-2), R Kavanagh (0-2)	Athletic Grounds, Armagh; Referee: F Kelly

06/04/14; Round 7	Laois	1-16 – 2-10	Down	O'Moore Park, Portlaoise; Referee: C Lane
06/04/14; Round 7	R Munnelly (0-6), J O'Loughlin (1-2), D Conway (0-3), D Kingston (0-3), C Meredith (0-1), D Strong (0-1)		D O'Hare (0-4), A Carr (1-0), C Maginn (1-0), J Johnston (0-2), C Garvey (0-1), C Laverty (0-1), M Poland (0-1), N Madine (0-1)	O'Moore Park, Portlaoise; Referee: C Lane

06/04/14; Round 7	Louth	1-12 – 2-10	Meath	Drogheda Park, Drogheda; Referee: B Cassidy
06/04/14; Round 7	B White (0-4), S Lennon (1-1), D Crilly (0-3), D Byrne (0-2), A McDonnell (0-1), C Doyle (0-1)		B McMahon (1-3), D McDonagh (1-0), A Tormey (0-2), G Reilly (0-2), S Bray (0-2), D Bray (0-1)	Drogheda Park, Drogheda; Referee: B Cassidy

06/04/14; Round 7	Monaghan	0-13 – 0-12	Galway	St Tiernach's Park, Clones; Referee: A Nolan
06/04/14; Round 7	C McManus (0-3), K Hughes (0-2), P Finlay (0-2), C Walshe (0-1), D Clerkin (0-1), D Malone (0-1), D Mone (0-1), F Kelly (0-1), S Gollogly (0-1)		M Martin (0-3), S Armstrong (0-2), A Varley (0-1), C Mulryan (0-1), G O'Donnell (0-1), M Lundy (0-1), P Conroy (0-1), P Varley (0-1), S Walsh (0-1)	St Tiernach's Park, Clones; Referee: A Nolan

=== Division 2 Final ===
27/04/14; 2:.00 p.m.	Monaghan	1-16 – 1-10	Donegal	Croke Park, Dublin; Referee: D Gough
27/04/14; 2:.00 p.m.	K Hughes (1-1), C McManus (0-3), P Finlay (0-3), D Hughes (0-2), P McKenna (0-2), C McGuinness (0-1), D Clerkin (0-1), D Mone (0-1), F Kelly (0-1), R Beggan (0-1)	Report	M Murphy (1-4), C McFadden (0-4), O MacNiallais (0-1), P McBrearty (0-1)	Croke Park, Dublin; Referee: D Gough

== Division 3 ==
=== Table ===
Compete in Division 3 final
Automatic relegation to Division 4

Team	Pld	W	D	L	F	A	Diff	Pts
Cavan	7	7	0	0	4-89	1-67	31	14
Roscommon	7	6	0	1	9-106	8-66	43	12
Fermanagh	7	3	1	3	13-93	12-81	15	7
Wexford	7	3	0	4	9-77	7-97	-14	6
Limerick	7	3	0	4	5-84	3-108	-18	6
Sligo	7	2	0	5	6-79	7-84	-8	4
Longford	7	2	0	5	3-76	8-82	-21	4
Offaly	7	1	1	5	7-71	10-90	-28	3

^{1}Sligo stay up due to their head to head record v Longford.

=== Rounds 1 to 7 ===
02/02/14; Round 1	Cavan	1-12 – 0-11	Fermanagh	Breffni Park, Cavan; Referee: E Kinsella
02/02/14; Round 1	E Keating (0-6), D Givney (0-3), M Reilly (0-3), F Flanagan (1-0)		T Corrigan (0-7), E Maguire (0-2), L Cullen (0-1), R Jones (0-1)	Breffni Park, Cavan; Referee: E Kinsella

02/02/14; Round 1	Longford	0-10 – 0-13	Roscommon	Pearse Park, Longford; Referee: Michael Duffy
02/02/14; Round 1	P McKeon (0-4), F McGee (0-3), C Mimnagh (0-1), M Hughes (0-1), S Doyle (0-1)		S Kilbride (0-4), C Cregg (0-2), D Shine (0-2), C Daly (0-1), D Keane (0-1), D Ward (0-1), K Higgins (0-1), S McDermott (0-1)	Pearse Park, Longford; Referee: Michael Duffy

02/02/14; Round 1	Sligo	0-15 – 0-13	Limerick	Markievicz Park, Sligo; Referee: B Cassidy
02/02/14; Round 1	A Marren (0-8), M Breheny (0-2), S Coen (0-2), D Kelly (0-1), E McHugh (0-1), P Hughes (0-1)		S O'Carroll (0-4), E Hanrahan (0-3), I Ryan (0-3), G Collins (0-1), M Brosnan (0-1), M Fitzgibbon (0-1)	Markievicz Park, Sligo; Referee: B Cassidy

02/02/14; Round 1	Wexford	1-14 – 0-12	Offaly	Wexford Park, Wexford; Referee: M Deegan
02/02/14; Round 1	C Lyng (0-5), B Brosnan (0-3), PJ Banville (0-3), T Rossiter (1-0), D Waters (0-1), J Holmes (0-1), P Byrne (0-1)		N Dunne (0-4), A Sullivan (0-1), C Hurley (0-1), J Maher (0-1), K Casey (0-1), N Darby (0-1), N McNamee (0-1), N Smith (0-1), R Allen (0-1)	Wexford Park, Wexford; Referee: M Deegan

08/02/14; Round 2	Fermanagh	2-13 – 1-10	Sligo	Brewster Park, Enniskillen; Referee: N Mooney
08/02/14; Round 2	Sean Quigley (1-8), R Jones (1-0), T Corrigan (0-2), E Maguire (0-1), L Cullen (0-1), R O'Callaghan (0-1)		A Marren (0-5), M Breheny (1-2), A Devaney (0-2), J Kilcullen (0-1)	Brewster Park, Enniskillen; Referee: N Mooney

09/02/14; Round 2	Limerick	2-11 – 0-11	Longford	Gaelic Grounds, Limerick; Referee: D O'Mahoney
09/02/14; Round 2	I Ryan (0-5), G Collins (1-1), S Buckley (1-0), I Corbett (0-1), J Mullane (0-1), J Riordan (0-1), M Brosnan (0-1), M Fitzgibbon (0-1)		B Farrell (0-2), F McGee (0-2), M Quinn (0-2), S McCormack (0-2), P Foy (0-1), P Gill (0-1), P McKeon (0-1)	Gaelic Grounds, Limerick; Referee: D O'Mahoney

09/02/14; Round 2	Offaly	0-8 – 1-11	Cavan	O'Connor Park, Tullamore; Referee: L Devenney
09/02/14; Round 2	N McNamee (0-4), J Maher (0-1), K Casey (0-1), N Dunne (0-1), P Cunningham (0-1)		E Keating (1-3), M Dunne (0-5), F Flanagan (0-1), K Tierney (0-1), M Argue (0-1)	O'Connor Park, Tullamore; Referee: L Devenney

09/02/14; Round 2	Roscommon	1-16 – 1-9	Wexford	Newpark, Kiltoom; Referee: S Hurson
09/02/14; Round 2	S Kilbride (1-4), C Cregg (0-5), K Higgins (0-3), E Smith (0-2), C Cafferky (0-1), C Daly (0-1)		B Brosnan (0-4), T Rossitor (1-1), B O'Gorman (0-1), Cillian Kehoe (0-1), Colm Kehoe (0-1), P Byrne (0-1)	Newpark, Kiltoom; Referee: S Hurson

02/03/14; Round 3	Longford	1-15 – 2-11	Fermanagh	Pearse Park, Longford; Referee: J Henry
02/03/14; Round 3	S McCormack (0-8), B Kavanagh (1-0), M Hughes (0-2), P McKeon (0-2), B Farrell (0-1), M Quinn (0-1), P Gill (0-1)		Sean Quigley (1-5), Seamus Quigley (1-4), B Cox (0-1), P McCusker (0-1)	Pearse Park, Longford; Referee: J Henry

02/03/14; Round 3	Roscommon	1-21 – 0-13	Limerick	Dr. Hyde Park, Roscommon; Referee: N Ward
02/03/14; Round 3	C Cregg (0-7), D Murtagh (1-2), C Daly (0-4), D Shine (0-4), S Kilbride (0-2), E Smith (0-1), K Higgins (0-1)		I Ryan (0-4), S Buckley (0-2), E Hanrahan (0-1), I Corbett (0-1), J Mullane (0-1), J Riordan (0-1), M Brosnan (0-1), S Lucey (0-1), S O'Carroll (0-1)	Dr. Hyde Park, Roscommon; Referee: N Ward

02/03/14; Round 3	Sligo	0-8 – 1-12	Offaly	Markievicz Park, Sligo; Referee: N Cullen
02/03/14; Round 3	M Breheny (0-7), A Marren (0-4), A Devaney (0-2), C Griffin (0-2), D Kelly (0-1), N Murphy (0-1), P Hughes (0-1)		N McNamee (0-6), R Allen (1-0), N Dunne (0-2), G Guilfoyle (0-1), K Casey (0-1), N Darby (0-1), P Sullivan (0-1)	Markievicz Park, Sligo; Referee: N Cullen

02/03/14; Round 3	Wexford	0-6 – 0-13	Cavan	Wexford Park, Wexford; Referee: M Collins
02/03/14; Round 3	B Brosnan (0-1), Cillian Kehoe (0-1), Colm Kehoe (0-1), J Tubritt (0-1), K O'Grady (0-1), P J Banville (0-1)		N McDermott (0-3), C Mackey (0-2), D Givney (0-2), M Dunne (0-2), G McKiernan (0-1), J McEnroe (0-1), M Argue (0-1), N Murray (0-1)	Wexford Park, Wexford; Referee: M Collins

09/03/14; Round 4	Cavan	1-12 – 0-10	Sligo	Breffni Park, Cavan; Referee: F Barry
09/03/14; Round 4	N McDermott (1-3), G McKiernan (0-4), M Dunne (0-3), C Mackey (0-1), M Reilly (0-1)		A Marren (0-4), M Breheny (0-4), D Kelly (0-2)	Breffni Park, Cavan; Referee: F Barry

09/03/14; Round 4	Fermanagh	4-10 – 3-17	Roscommon	Brewster Park, Enniskillen; Referee: B Rice
09/03/14; Round 4	Sean Quigley (1-5), Seamus Quigley (2-1), L Cullen (1-0), P McCusker (0-1), R Jones (0-1), T Corrigan (0-1), T McElroy (0-1)		D Shine (0-7), D Murtagh (0-3), C Cregg (1-0), C Daly (1-0), E Smith (1-0), C Shine (0-2), S Kilbride (0-2), C Compton (0-1), M Nally (0-1), N Collins (0-1)	Brewster Park, Enniskillen; Referee: B Rice

09/03/14; Round 4	Limerick	1-14 – 1-13	Wexford	Gaelic Grounds, Limerick; Referee: S Hehir
09/03/14; Round 4	I Ryan (1-10), E Hanrahan (0-1), G Collins (0-1), I Corbett (0-1), S O'Carroll (0-1)		B Brosnan (0-5), PJ Banville (1-1), K O'Grady (0-2), A Flynn (0-1), B Malone (0-1), C Carty (0-1), C Lyng (0-1), D Waters (0-1)	Gaelic Grounds, Limerick; Referee: S Hehir

09/03/14; Round 4	Offaly	1-10 – 1-15	Longford	O'Connor Park, Tullamore; Referee: D Maher
09/03/14; Round 4	P Cunningham (0-5), J Maher (1-0), G Guilfoyle (0-2), N McNamee (0-2), A Sullivan (0-1)		S McCormack (1-8), B Farrell (0-1), B Kavanagh (0-1), C Smyth (0-1), D Gallagher (0-1), E Williams (0-1), M Hughes (0-1), S Kiernan (0-1)	O'Connor Park, Tullamore; Referee: D Maher

16/03/14; Round 5	Limerick	1-6 – 0-18	Fermanagh	Gaelic Grounds, Limerick; Referee: L Devanney
16/03/14; Round 5	E Hanrahan (1-3), I Ryan (0-2), T Lee (0-1)		T Corrigan (0-10), R Jones (0-3), E Donnelly (0-1), J Woods (0-1), R McCluskey (0-1), R O'Callaghan (0-1), T McElroy (0-1)	Gaelic Grounds, Limerick; Referee: L Devanney

16/03/14; Round 5	Longford	0-10 – 1-9	Cavan	Pearse Park, Longford; Referee: N Cullen
16/03/14; Round 5	S McCormack (0-8), B Kavanagh (0-1), M Quinn (0-1)		M Dunne (1-2), K Tierney (0-2), N McDermott (0-2), C Mackey (0-1), G McKiernan (0-1), M Reilly (0-1)	Pearse Park, Longford; Referee: N Cullen

16/03/14; Round 5	Roscommon	3-19 – 2-4	Offaly	Dr. Hyde Park, Roscommon; Referee: D Fahy
16/03/14; Round 5	D Shine (0-11), C Cregg (2-2), D Murtagh (1-0), D Keane (0-2), S Kilbride (0-2), E Smith (0-1), K Higgins (0-1)		A Sullivan (1-0), D Hanlon (1-0), J Moloney (0-1), N McNamee (0-1), P Cunningham (0-1), R Allen (0-1)	Dr. Hyde Park, Roscommon; Referee: D Fahy

16/03/14; Round 5	Wexford	2-12 – 1-12	Sligo	Wexford Park, Wexford; Referee: J Hickey
16/03/14; Round 5	B Brosnan (1-1), M O'Regan (1-1), C Lyng (0-3), D Waters (0-2), K O'Grady (0-2), C Carty (0-1), J Holmes (0-1), PJ Banville (0-1)		A Marren (0-8), M Breheny (0-3), P Hughes (1-0), D Kelly (0-1)	Wexford Park, Wexford; Referee: J Hickey

29/03/14; Round 6	Cavan	0-14 – 1-8	Roscommon	Breffni Park, Cavan; Referee: S Hurson
29/03/14; Round 6	N McDermott (0-5), M Dunne (0-4), G McKiernan (0-2), D O'Reilly (0-1), E Keating (0-1), K Tierney (0-1)		D Shine (0-4), S Kilbride (1-1), C Murtagh (0-1), F Cregg (0-1), K Higgins (0-1)	Breffni Park, Cavan; Referee: S Hurson

30/03/14; Round 6	Fermanagh	2-20 – 3-8	Wexford	Brewster Park, Enniskillen; Referee: M Duffy
30/03/14; Round 6	T Corrigan (0-7), E Courtney (0-4), B Owens (1-0), R Corrigan (1-0), A Breen (0-2), D McCusker (0-2), E Donnelly (0-2), T McElroy (0-2), R Jones (0-1)		A Flynn (1-1), G Cullen (1-1), J Holmes (1-0), B Brosnan (0-1), B Malone (0-1), C Kehoe (0-1), C Lyng (0-1), D Waters (0-1), PJ Banville (0-1)	Brewster Park, Enniskillen; Referee: M Duffy

30/03/14; Round 6	Offaly	1-12 – 1-13	Limerick	O'Connor Park, Tullamore; Referee: S Hehir
30/03/14; Round 6	A Sullivan (0-4), J Maher (0-3), N McNamee (0-3), D Hanlon (1-0), P Cunningham (0-2)		E Hanrahan (0-8), J Riordan (1-0), I Ryan (0-2), G Collins (0-1), I Corbett (0-1), M Brosnan (0-1)	O'Connor Park, Tullamore; Referee: S Hehir

30/03/14; Round 6	Sligo	0-15 – 2-8	Longford	Markievicz Park, Sligo; Referee: S McLaughlin
30/03/14; Round 6	A Marren (0-5), M Breheny (0-4), N Murphy (0-2), E McHugh (0-1), J Kilcullen (0-1), J Martyn (0-1), K Cawley (0-1)		S McCormack (1-4), M Hughes (1-0), A Rowan (0-1), B Farrell (0-1), P Barden (0-1), S Mulligan (0-1)	Markievicz Park, Sligo; Referee: S McLaughlin

05/04/14; Round 7	Limerick	0-14 – 0-18	Cavan	Gaelic Grounds, Limerick; Referee: L Devanney
05/04/14; Round 7	K Phair (0-3), B Scanlon (0-2), E Hanrahan (0-2), G Collins (0-2), J Galvin (0-2), P Brown (0-2), I Ryan (0-1)		M Lyng (0-5), E Keating (0-4), D O'Reilly (0-2), J Brady (0-2), N Murray (0-2), P Tinnelly (0-2), R Maloney Derham (0-1)	Gaelic Grounds, Limerick; Referee: L Devanney

06/04/14; Round 7	Fermanagh	3-10 – 2-13	Offaly	Brewster Park, Enniskillen; Referee: B Rice
06/04/14; Round 7	R Jones (2-4), B Owens (1-1), C Jones (0-2), E Courtney (0-2), D McCusker (0-1)		N McNamee (0-8), D Hanlon (1-0), N Geraghty (1-0), J Maher (0-2), E Carroll (0-1), P Sullivan (0-1), R Allen (0-1)	Brewster Park, Enniskillen; Referee: B Rice

06/04/14; Round 7	Roscommon	0-12 – 1-6	Sligo	Dr. Hyde Park, Roscommon; Referee: M McNally
06/04/14; Round 7	C Cregg (0-4), D Smith (0-4), C Compton (0-2), D Keane (0-1), D Shine (0-1)		N Murphy (0-3), J Kilcullen (1-0), A Marren (0-1), P Hughes (0-1), S Coen (0-1)	Dr. Hyde Park, Roscommon; Referee: M McNally

06/04/14; Round 7	Wexford	1-15 – 2-10	Longford	Wexford Park, Wexford; Referee: F Barry
06/04/14; Round 7	C Lyng (0-5), K O'Grady (1-1), B Brosnan (0-2), PJ Banville (0-2), A Flynn (0-1), D Waters (0-1), J Holmes (0-1), M O'Regan (0-1), T Rossiter (0-1)		P Barden (1-3), S McCormack (0-5), F McGee (1-0), M Hughes (0-1), M Quinn (0-1)	Wexford Park, Wexford; Referee: F Barry

=== Division 3 Final ===
26/04/14; 7:00 p.m.	Roscommon	1-17 - 0-18	Cavan	Croke Park, Dublin; Attendance: 8,654; Referee: S Hurson
26/04/14; 7:00 p.m.	D Shine (0-6), S Kilbride (0-5), D Keenan (1-0), N Daly (0-2), C Compton (0-1), D O'Gara (0-1), F Cregg (0-1), K Higgins (0-1)	Report	N McDermott (0-4), M Dunne (0-3), M Reilly (0-3), C Mackey (0-2), E Keating (0-2), G McKiernan (0-2), F Flanagan (0-1), J McEnroe (0-1)	Croke Park, Dublin; Attendance: 8,654; Referee: S Hurson

== Division 4 ==
=== Table ===
Compete in Division 4 final and automatic promotion to Division 3

Team	Pld	W	D	L	F	A	Diff	Pts
Tipperary	7	5	1	1	14-122	9-83	54	11
Clare	7	5	1	1	10-93	9-58	38	11
Wicklow	7	5	0	2	12-98	6-96	20	10
Leitrim	7	4	1	2	6-86	9-72	5	9
Waterford	7	2	1	4	4-67	6-89	-28	5
Antrim	7	2	0	5	10-91	11-81	7	4
London	7	1	1	5	9-57	11-89	-38	3
Carlow	7	1	1	5	8-74	12-120	-58	3

^{1}Tipperary are placed ahead of Clare because they won the head-to-head game between the teams (3-09 to 0-14).

^{2}London are placed ahead of Carlow because they had a superior scoring difference; the head-to-head game between the teams was a draw (2-07 to 0-13).

=== Rounds 1 to 7 ===
02/02/14; Round 1	Carlow	1-8 – 2-24	Tipperary	Dr. Cullen Park, Carlow; Referee: D Gough
02/02/14; Round 1	S Kinsella (1-0), D Foley (0-2), G Power (0-2), B Murphy (0-1), D St Ledger (0-1), J Lowry (0-1), S McGrath (0-1)		C Sweeney (1-8), B Grogan (0-6), P Austin (1-1), D Leahy (0-2), A Matassa (0-1), A Morrissey (0-1), C McCullough (0-1), G Hally (0-1), I Fahy (0-1), M Quinlivan (0-1), P Acheson (0-1)	Dr. Cullen Park, Carlow; Referee: D Gough

02/02/14; Round 1	Leitrim	1-11 – 1-6	Antrim	Páirc Seán Mac Diarmada, Carrick-on-Shannon; Referee: C Brannigan
02/02/14; Round 1	E Mulligan (0-5), T Beirne (1-1), K Conlon (0-2), P Brennan (0-2), R Cox (0-1)		N McKeever (1-0), P Cunningham (0-2), T McCann (0-2), P Kelly (0-1), P Maguire (0-1)	Páirc Seán Mac Diarmada, Carrick-on-Shannon; Referee: C Brannigan

02/02/14; Round 1	Waterford	1-9 – 3-10	Clare	Fraher Field, Dungarvan; Referee: F Kelly
02/02/14; Round 1	P Whyte (1-5), T Grey (0-2), D Allen (0-1), S Briggs (0-1)		D Tubridy (0-6), M O'Leary (1-1), S McGrath (1-1), M O'Shea (1-0), P Collins (0-1), S Brennan (0-1)	Fraher Field, Dungarvan; Referee: F Kelly

02/02/14; Round 1	Wicklow	3-13 – 1-8	London	Aughrim County Ground, Aughrim; Referee: G McCormack
02/02/14; Round 1	L Glynn (3-3), S Furlong (0-4), R Finn (0-2), A McLoughlin (0-1), C McGraynor (0-1), K Murphy (0-1), P McWalter (0-1)		A Moyles (1-3), M Miskelly (0-2), J Feeney (0-1), M Gottsche (0-1), S Kelly (0-1)	Aughrim County Ground, Aughrim; Referee: G McCormack

09/02/14; Round 2	Antrim	1-13 – 3-9	Wicklow	Fr McGuigan Park, Ahoghill; Referee: C O'Hagan
09/02/14; Round 2	CJ McGourty (0-7), T McCann (1-2), M Pollock (0-2), N McKeever (0-1), R Murray (0-1)		L Glynn (2-1), S Furlong (0-4), J Staf (1-0), C McGraynor (0-2), N Gaffney (0-1), P McLoughlin (0-1)	Fr McGuigan Park, Ahoghill; Referee: C O'Hagan

09/02/14; Round 2	Clare	0-11 – 1-8	Leitrim	Cusack Park, Ennis; Referee: D Brazil
09/02/14; Round 2	G Brennan (0-4), M O'Leary (0-4), M O'Shea (0-1), S Brennan (0-1), S Collins (0-1)		E Mulligan (1-4), A Hickey (0-1), D Wrynn (0-1), K Conlan (0-1), R Cox (0-1)	Cusack Park, Ennis; Referee: D Brazil

09/02/14; Round 2	Tipperary	0-12 – 1-9	Waterford	Clonmel GAA Ground, Clonmel; Referee: J Hickey
09/02/14; Round 2	C Sweeney (0-4), B Grogan (0-2), M Quinlivan (0-2), P Austin (0-2), B Fox (0-1), C McCullagh (0-1)		P Whyte (1-5), JJ Hutchinson (0-3), S Aherne (0-1)	Clonmel GAA Ground, Clonmel; Referee: J Hickey

09/02/14; Round 2	London	2-7 – 0-13	Carlow	Emerald GAA Grounds, Ruislip; Referee: B Rice
09/02/14; Round 2	B Mitchell (1-0), M Walsh (1-0), M Gottsche (0-2), A Bradley (0-1), A Moyles (0-1), D Ryan (0-1), J Feeney (0-1), L Mulvey (0-1)		P Broderick (0-5), G Dempsey (0-2), D Foley (0-1), D St Ledger (0-1), J Kane (0-1), J Kennedy (0-1), S Kinsella (0-1), W Minchin (0-1)	Emerald GAA Grounds, Ruislip; Referee: B Rice

23/02/14; Round 3	London	1-8 – 2-14	Clare	Emerald GAA Grounds, Ruislip; Referee: J Hickey
23/02/14; Round 3	L Mulvey (1-1), S Kelly (0-2), C McCarron (0-1), E O'Neill (0-1), G Crowley (0-1), J Feeney (0-1), L Colfer (0-1)		S McGrath (1-3), M O'Leary (0-4), G Brennan (1-1), D Tubridy (0-2), P Collins (0-2), D Ryan (0-1), S Collins (0-1)	Emerald GAA Grounds, Ruislip; Referee: J Hickey

02/03/14; Round 3	Antrim	1-17 – 0-6	Waterford	Kickhams Creggan GAA Ground, Creggan; Referee: S McLaughlin
02/03/14; Round 3	CJ McGourty (0-10), P Cunningham (1-2), M McCann (0-2), B Neeson (0-1), C Murray (0-1), K Niblock (0-1)		P Whyte (0-3), JJ Hutchinson (0-1), O Keevers (0-1), S Ahearne (0-1)	Kickhams Creggan GAA Ground, Creggan; Referee: S McLaughlin

02/03/14; Round 3	Clare	2-13 – 1-8	Wicklow	Cusack Park, Ennis; Referee: S Joy
02/03/14; Round 3	D Tubridy (0-7), S Brennan (1-1), G Brennan (1-0), P McMahon (0-2), S McGrath (0-2), Sean Collins (0-1)		S Furlong (0-3), J Staf (1-0), C McGraynor (0-2), N Gaffney (0-1), P McWalter (0-1), R Finn (0-1)	Cusack Park, Ennis; Referee: S Joy

02/03/14; Round 3	Leitrim	1-17 – 1-8	Carlow	Páirc Seán Mac Diarmada, Carrick-on-Shannon; Referee: J Molloy
02/03/14; Round 3	E Mulligan (0-5), J Glancy (1-2), G Hickey (0-2), S McWeeney (0-2), W McKeon (0-2), A Hickey (0-1), F Clancy (0-1), K Conlon (0-1), R Lowe (0-1)		S Kinsella (1-3), D Foley (0-2), D St Ledger (0-1), P Reid (0-1), W Minchin (0-1)	Páirc Seán Mac Diarmada, Carrick-on-Shannon; Referee: J Molloy

02/03/14; Round 4	London	1-7 – 1-19	Tipperary	Emerald GAA Grounds, Ruislip; Referee: F Barry
02/03/14; Round 4	S Hickey (1-0), M Gottsche (0-2), S Kelly (0-2), A Moyles (0-1), C McCarron (0-1), M Miskelly (0-1)		C Sweeney (0-9), B Grogan (1-2), P Acheson (0-2), P Austin (0-2), B Fox (0-1), C McCullagh (0-1), D Leahy (0-1), M Quinlivan (0-1)	Emerald GAA Grounds, Ruislip; Referee: F Barry

09/03/14; Round 4	Carlow	3-15 – 2-17	Antrim	Dr. Cullen Park, Carlow; Referee: M McNally
09/03/14; Round 4	S Kinsella (2-4), P Broderick (0-9), R Mahon (1-0), D Foley (0-1), W Minchin (0-1)		C J McGourty (0-8), M Pollock (0-4), C Murray (1-1), M McCann (0-3), P Cunningham (1-0), J Laverty (0-1)	Dr. Cullen Park, Carlow; Referee: M McNally

09/03/14; Round 4	Tipperary	3-9 – 0-14	Clare	Semple Stadium, Thurles; Referee: N Ward
09/03/14; Round 4	B Grogan (2-2), C Sweeney (1-1), B Fox (0-2), M Quinlivan (0-2), P Austin (0-2)		D Tubridy (0-5), M O'Leary (0-4), S McGrath (0-3), J Malone (0-1), R Donnelly (0-1)	Semple Stadium, Thurles; Referee: N Ward

09/03/14; Round 4	Waterford	0-9 – 2-10	London	WIT Sports Campus, Waterford; Referee: J Bermingham
09/03/14; Round 4	P Whyte (0-6), S Ahearne (0-2), JJ Hutchinson (0-1)		G Crowley (1-1), M Miskelly (0-3), A Moyles (1-0), A Flaherty (0-2), J Feeney (0-2), S Hickey (0-2)	WIT Sports Campus, Waterford; Referee: J Bermingham

09/03/14; Round 5	Wicklow	0-11 – 1-17	Leitrim	Aughrim County Ground, Aughrim; Referee: G McCormack
09/03/14; Round 5	R Finn (0-4), S Furlong (0-4), P Earls (0-2), C McGraynor (0-1)		E Mulligan (0-7), R Cox (1-1), J Glancy (0-2), K Conlan (0-2), R Lowe (0-2), A Hickey (0-1), D Sweeney (0-1), G Hickey (0-1)	Aughrim County Ground, Aughrim; Referee: G McCormack

16/03/14; Round 5	Waterford	1-13 – 0-11	Leitrim	Fraher Field, Dungarvan; Referee: J Bermingham
16/03/14; Round 5	S Ahearne (1-2), P Whyte (0-3), C Phelan (0-2), D Allen (0-2), JJ Hutchinson (0-2), S Briggs (0-1), W Hutchinson (0-1)		E Mulligan (0-7), D Moran (0-1), J Glancy (0-1), R Cox (0-1), S Foley (0-1)	Fraher Field, Dungarvan; Referee: J Bermingham

16/03/14; Round 5	Carlow	1-11 – 1-25	Wicklow	Dr. Cullen Park, Carlow; Referee: J Henry
16/03/14; Round 5	P Broderick (1-6), B Kavanagh (0-1), D Foley (0-1), D St Ledger (0-1), H Gahan (0-1), S Kinsella (0-1)		C McGraynor (0-9), S Furlong (1-4), J Staf (0-2), P Earls (0-2), R Finn (0-2), D Hayden (0-1), D Healy (0-1), K Murphy (0-1), L Glynn (0-1), N Gaffney (0-1), P McWalter (0-1)	Dr. Cullen Park, Carlow; Referee: J Henry

16/03/14; Round 5	Tipperary	3-20 – 2-17	Antrim	Semple Stadium, Thurles; Referee: S Joy
16/03/14; Round 5	B Grogan (2-7), C Sweeney (1-7), P Austin (0-2), B Fox (0-1), C McCullagh (0-1), G Hannigan (0-1), M Quinlivan (0-1)		B Neeson (2-8), M Pollock (0-3), J Crozier (0-1), K Niblock (0-1), M McCann (0-1), N McKeever (0-1), P McBride (0-1), R McGrady (0-1)	Semple Stadium, Thurles; Referee: S Joy

30/03/14; Round 6	Antrim	3-15 – 1-10	London	Kickhams Creggan GAA Ground, Creggan; Referee: E O'Grady
30/03/14; Round 6	B Neeson (1-6), T McCann (2-3), M Pollock (0-2), N McKeever (0-2), M Sweeney (0-1), S McVeigh (0-1)		M Walsh (1-0), C McCarron (0-2), D Dunleavy (0-2), M Gottsche (0-2), B Mitchell (0-1), J Feeney (0-1), L Colfer (0-1), S Kelly (0-1)	Kickhams Creggan GAA Ground, Creggan; Referee: E O'Grady

30/03/14; Round 6	Clare	3-21 – 2-10	Carlow	Cusack Park, Ennis; Referee: J Molloy
30/03/14; Round 6	D Tubridy (1-9), M O'Leary (1-5), G Brennan (1-1), Sean Collins (0-2), C O'Connor (0-1), J Malone (0-1), S Hickey (0-1), S McGrath (0-1)		S Kinsella (2-1), P Broderick (0-6), C Moran (0-2), W Minchin (0-1)	Cusack Park, Ennis; Referee: J Molloy

30/03/14; Round 6	Leitrim	0-16 – 5-16	Tipperary	Páirc Seán Mac Diarmada, Carrick-on-Shannon; Referee: D Brazil
30/03/14; Round 6	E Mulligan (0-4), J Glancy (0-3), K Conlon (0-3), D Sweeney (0-2), A Hickey (0-1), G Reynolds (0-1), S McWeeney (0-1), W McKeon (0-1)		C Sweeney (2-7), P Austin (1-3), B Fox (1-2), I Fahy (1-0), G Hannigan (0-1), G Mulhair (0-1), M Quinlivan (0-1), R Kiely (0-1)	Páirc Seán Mac Diarmada, Carrick-on-Shannon; Referee: D Brazil

30/03/14; Round 6	Wicklow	0-20 – 0-12	Waterford	Aughrim County Ground, Aughrim; Referee: D Maher
30/03/14; Round 6	S Furlong (2-4), D Hayden (0-2), K Murphy (0-2), P McWalter (0-2), C McGraynor (0-1), L Glynn (0-1), P Cunningham (0-1), R Finn (0-1)		S Ahearne (0-5), JJ Hutchinson (0-2), T Grey (0-2), L O Lonain (0-1), M O'Gorman (0-1), P Whyte (0-1)	Aughrim County Ground, Aughrim; Referee: D Maher

06/04/14; Round 7	Antrim	0-6 – 0-10	Clare	Kickhams Creggan GAA Ground, Creggan; Referee: C O'Hagan
06/04/14; Round 7	M Pollock (0-2), B Neeson (0-1), CJ McGourty (0-1), J Laverty (0-1), T McCann (0-1)		D Tubridy (0-3), S McGrath (0-3), P Collins (0-2), M O'Leary (0-1), S Collins (0-1)	Kickhams Creggan GAA Ground, Creggan; Referee: C O'Hagan

06/04/14; Round 7	London	1-7 – 2-6	Leitrim	Emerald GAA Grounds, Ruislip; Referee: C Branagan
06/04/14; Round 7	G Crowley (1-0), A Faherty (0-2), J Feeney (0-2), L Colfer (0-2), S Kelly (0-1)		W McKeon (1-1), R Lowe (1-0), E Mulligan (0-2), D Sweeney (0-1), R Cox (0-1), R Gallagher (0-1)	Emerald GAA Grounds, Ruislip; Referee: C Branagan

06/04/14; Round 7	Tipperary	0-22 – 4-12	Wicklow	Semple Stadium, Thurles; Referee: J Henry
06/04/14; Round 7	C Sweeney (0-5), P Austin (0-4), B Grogan (0-3), B Mulvihill (0-2), D Leahy (0-2), P Acheson (0-2), B O'Brien (0-1), L Egan (0-1), P Dalton (0-1), R Kiely (0-1)		S Furlong (1-4), L Glynn (1-2), R Finn (1-2), J Staf (1-0), K Murphy (0-1), N Gaffney (0-1), P Cunningham (0-1), P McWalter (0-1)	Semple Stadium, Thurles; Referee: J Henry

06/04/14; Round 7	Waterford	1-9 – 0-9	Carlow	Fraher Field, Dungarvan; Referee: S Joy
06/04/14; Round 7	L O Lionain (1-3), S Ahearne (0-2), JJ Hutchinson (0-1), L O Corraoin (0-1), M O'Gorman (0-1), S Briggs (0-1)		P Broderick (0-7), C Coughlan (0-1), S Kinsella (0-1)	Fraher Field, Dungarvan; Referee: S Joy

=== Division 4 Final ===
26/04/14; 5:00 p.m.	Tipperary	1-16 - 1-15	Clare	Croke Park, Dublin; Referee: N Mooney
26/04/14; 5:00 p.m.	C Sweeney (1-8), B Grogan (0-4), G Hannigan (0-1), I Fahey (0-1), R Kiely (0-1), S O'Brien (0-1)	Report	D Tubridy (0-7), S McGrath (0-4), M O'Leary (1-0), C O'Connor (0-1), C Russell (0-1), J Malone (0-1), S Hickey (0-1)	Croke Park, Dublin; Referee: N Mooney

== Statistics ==
- All scores correct as of 19 April 2016

=== Scoring ===
- Widest winning margin: 19
  - Carlow 1-8 - 2-24 Tipperary (Division 4)
  - Down 4-16 - 0-9 Louth (Division 2)
- Most goals in a match: 7
  - Meath 3-18 - 4-11 Galway (Division 2)
  - Fermanagh 4-10 - 3-17 Roscommon (Division 3)
- Most points in a match: 37
  - Tipperary 3-20 - 2-17 Antrim (Division 4)
  - Kildare 2-19 - 2-18 Mayo (Division 1)
  - Kildare 1-21 - 3-16 Tyrone (Division 1)
- Most goals by one team in a match: 5
  - Leitrim 0-16 - 5-16 Tipperary (Division 4)
- Highest aggregate score: 52 points
  - Tipperary 3-20 - 2-17 Antrim (Division 4)
- Lowest aggregate score: 16 points
  - Antrim 0-6 - 0-10 Clare (Division 4)

=== Top scorers ===
Overall

Rank	Player	County	Tally	Total	Matches	Average
1	Conor Sweeney	Tipperary	6-49	67	8	8.4
2	Mark Lynch	Derry	2-44	50	8	6.2
3	David Tubridy	Clare	1-39	42	7	6
4	Sean McCormack	Longford	2-35	41	7	5.9
4	Barry Grogan	Tipperary	5-26	41	7	5.9
6	Colm McFadden	Donegal	3-31	40	8	5
6	Conor McManus	Monaghan	0-40	40	8	5
8	Donal O'Hare	Down	1-36	39	7	5.6
8	Seanie Furlong	Wicklow	4-27	39	7	5.6
8	James O'Donoghue	Kerry	5-24	39	7	5.6
11	Michael Murphy	Donegal	3-28	37	8	4.6
11	Emlyn Mulligan	Leitrim	1-34	37	7	5.3
13	Paul Broderick	Carlow	1-33	36	6	6
14	Donal Shine	Roscommon	0-35	35	8	4.4
14	Adrian Marren	Sligo	0-35	35	7	5

Single game

Rank	Player	County	Tally	Total	Opposition
1	Brian Neeson	Antrim	2-08	14	Tipperary
2	Donal O'Hare	Down	1-10	13	Louth
2	Ian Ryan	Limerick	1-10	13	Wexford
2	Barry Grogan	Tipperary	2-07	13	Antrim
2	Conor Sweeney	Tipperary	2-07	13	Leitrim
6	David Tubridy	Clare	1-09	12	Carlow
6	Alan Freeman	Mayo	2-06	12	Derry
6	James O'Donoghue	Kerry	3-03	12	Tyrone
6	Leighton Glynn	Wicklow	3-03	12	London
10	Jamie Clarke	Armagh	0-11	11	Meath
10	Donal Shine	Roscommon	0-11	11	Offaly
10	Mark Lynch	Derry	1-08	11	Dublin
10	Seán Quigley	Fermanagh	1-08	11	Sligo
10	Sean McCormack	Longford	1-08	11	Offaly
10	Conor Sweeney	Tipperary	1-08	11	Carlow
10	Conor Sweeney	Tipperary	1-08	11	Clare
