= Meaney =

Meaney is a surname. Notable people with the surname include:

- Aislinn Meaney (born 1998), Irish association footballer
- Audrey Meaney (1931–2021), English archaeologist and historian
- Colm Meaney (born 1953), Irish actor
- Con Meaney (1890–1970), Irish politician and farmer
- Denis Meaney (1936–2011), Australian rugby league player
- Kevin Meaney (1956–2016), American comedian and actor
- Kevin Meaney (Gaelic footballer), Irish football player
- John Meaney (born 1957), British science fiction author
- John Meaney (footballer) (1919–2000), English footballer
- Liam Meaney (born 1972), Irish hurler
- Michael Meaney (born 1951), Canadian professor specializing in biological psychiatry, neurology, and neurosurgery
- Michael Meaney (darts player) (born 1989), Irish darts player
- Nick Meaney (born 1997), Australian rugby league player
- Patrick Meaney, American film director, screenwriter, producer, comic book writer, and editor
- Sean Meaney (born 1986), rugby player
- Thomas Meaney (1931–2022), Irish politician and farmer
- Thomas Francis Meaney (1888–1968), American judge

== See also ==
- Mooney
- Meanie (disambiguation)
- Meany (disambiguation)
