= Moonie (disambiguation) =

A Moonie is a member of the Unification Church.

Moonie may also refer to:

- A fan of the manga and anime franchise Sailor Moon

== Characters ==
- Moon Knight, Marvel Comics character, nicknamed Moonie by fans
- Moonie, character in New Waterford Girl
- Moonie, character in comic book series by Nick Cuti

== People ==
- Moonie (surname)
- Otto Miller (catcher) or Moonie, American baseball player
- Brendan Moon or Moonie (born 1958), Australian rugby player
- Keith Moon or Moonie (1946–1978), rock and roll drummer
- Clifford "Moonie" Pusey, former guitarist for Steel Pulse

== Places ==
- Moonie, Queensland, town in Australia
- Moonie Highway, road in Australia
- Moonie River, river in Australia

== Other uses ==
- Moonie (dog), a canine actor
- The Moonies, British rock band
- Moonyfishes, a common name for the Monodactylidae, a group of fishes with flattened disc-shaped bodies

== See also ==
- Mooney, Irish surname, sometimes spelled "Moonie"
- Mount Moonie, mountain in Antarctica
- Mooney (disambiguation)
- Moony (born 1980), Italian musician
- Mouni (disambiguation)
- Super Moonies, German pop band
