= Mouni =

Mouni may refer to:

- Mouní (Μουνί), a modern Greek vulgarity for vagina
- Mouni (Burkina Faso town)
- Mouni (film), a 2003 Kannada language film
- Mouni Roy (born 1985), Indian actress

== See also ==
- Moonie (disambiguation)
- Mooney, a surname
