= Mooney (disambiguation) =

Mooney is a family name.

Mooney may also refer to:

- Mooney (radio programme), an Irish radio programme
- Mooney International Corporation, an American aircraft manufacturer
- "Mooney", nickname for American mobster Sam Giancana

== See also ==
- Moony
- Mooneye
- Moonie (disambiguation)
