= Meany =

Meany is a surname. Notable people with the surname include:

- Edmond S. Meany, American historian, politician, and Mountaineer
- George Meany, American labor leader, first president of the AFL-CIO
- Mary K. Meany (1897–2000), American educator and politician
- Paul Meany, American musician
- Bugs Meany, a recurring villain in the Encyclopedia Brown series of books

== See also ==
- A Prayer for Owen Meany, a novel by John Irving
- Meanie (disambiguation)
- Blue Meanies (Yellow Submarine)
- Meaney
