= 2012 Leinster Senior Football Championship =

Gaelic football tournament season

The 2012 Leinster Senior Football Championship was that year's installment of the annual Leinster Senior Football Championship held under the auspices of the Leinster GAA. It was won by Dublin who defeated Meath in the final. The winning Dublin team received the Delaney Cup, and automatically advanced to the quarter-final stage of the 2012 All-Ireland Senior Football Championship. They limply exited in the semi-final after defeat to All-Ireland final losers Mayo.

Meath entered the All-Ireland Qualifiers but lost their next game, to Laois.

== Bracket ==
Preliminary round
Westmeath	0-14
Louth	2-9
Longford	1-10
Laois	0-12
Meath	0-16
Wicklow	0-11

Quarter-finals
Louth	0-12
Dublin	2-22
Longford	0-15
Wexford	1-13
Meath	2-21
Carlow	1-9
Offaly	0-6
Kildare	0-19

Semi-finals
Dublin	2-11
Wexford	1-10
Meath	1-17
Kildare	1-11

Final
Dublin	2-13
Meath	1-13

== Preliminary round ==
20 May 2012
3:30pm
Preliminary round

Westmeath	0-14 - 2-9	Louth
J Heslin (2f) 0-5, P Sharry (1 '45') 0-2, K Martin, G Egan, D McDermott, David Glennon, C McCormack, P Bannon, J Dolan 0-1 each	Report	R Carroll 1-2, D O'Connor 1-0, D Clarke (1f) 0-3, D Crilly 0-2, R Finnegan, J Carr 0-1 each

Pairc Tailteann, Navan
Attendance: 4,500 (estimated)
Referee: M Higgins (Fermanagh)
20 May 2012
3:30pm
Preliminary round

Longford	1-10 - 0-12	Laois
P Barden 1-2, S McCormack 0-4 (2f), B Kavanagh 0-2, D Barden, M Quinn 0-1 each.	Report	G Walsh 0-4 (2f, 1 45), R Munnelly (1f), D Strong 0-2 each, C Begley, K Meaney, C Boyle, C Kelly (f) 0-1 each

Pearse Park, Longford
Attendance: 5,587
Referee: M Duffy (Sligo)
27 May 2012
3:30pm
Preliminary round

Meath	0-16 - 0-11	Wicklow
G Reilly 0-5, B Farrell 0-4, J Sheridan, J Queeney 0-2 each, A Forde, C Ward (1f), M Collins 0-1 each	Report	T Hannon 0-6 (4f 2 '45'), J McGrath 0-3, S Furlong (f), S Byrne 0-1 each

Dr Cullen Park, Carlow
Attendance: 7,350
Referee: P Hughes (Armagh)

== Quarter-finals ==
3 June 2012; 2:00pm Quarter-final	Wexford	0-15 - 2-9	Longford	Croke Park, Dublin; Attendance: 31,570; Referee: M Collins (Cork); Man of the Match: Adrian Flynn (Gusserane O'Rahillys)
3 June 2012; 2:00pm Quarter-final	Adrian Flynn 0-5, Ben Brosnan (0-3f) and Ciaran Lyng (0-1f), 0-3 each, Redmond Barry 0-2, Rob Tierney and Eric Bradley 0-1 each	Report	Paul Barden 2-0 (1-0 pen), Brian Kavanagh and Sean McCormack (0-3f) 0-4 each, Niall Mulligan 0-1	Croke Park, Dublin; Attendance: 31,570; Referee: M Collins (Cork); Man of the Match: Adrian Flynn (Gusserane O'Rahillys)

3 June 2012; 4:00pm Quarter-final	Dublin	2-22 - 0-12	Louth	Croke Park, Dublin; Attendance: 31,570; Referee: E Kinsella (Laois); Man of the Match: Bernard Brogan (St. OP/ER)
3 June 2012; 4:00pm Quarter-final	Bernard Brogan 2-5 (0-1f), Kevin McManamon and Diamuid Connolly 0-3 each, Stephen Cluxton (2 '45), Paul Flynn, Bryan Cullen, Alan Brogan, Craig Dias 0-2 each, Denis Bastick 0-1.	Report	Darren Clarke 0-8 (0-7f, 0-1 sl), Ray Finnegan, Ronan Carroll, Adrian Reid, JP Rooney 0-1 each	Croke Park, Dublin; Attendance: 31,570; Referee: E Kinsella (Laois); Man of the Match: Bernard Brogan (St. OP/ER)

10 June 2012; 4:00pm Quarter-final replay	Longford	0-15 - 1-13	Wexford	O'Connor Park, Tullamore; Attendance: 10,171; Referee: C Lane (Cork)
10 June 2012; 4:00pm Quarter-final replay	S McCormack 0-6 (4f), P Barden 0-4, B Kavanagh 0-2, M Quinn, S Mulligan, P Kelly 0-1 each	Report	S Roche 0-5 (2f), R Barry 1-2, B Brosnan 0-4 (2f), A Flynn, PJ Banville 0-1 each	O'Connor Park, Tullamore; Attendance: 10,171; Referee: C Lane (Cork)

10 June 2012; 2:00pm Quarter-final	Carlow	1-12 - 1-12	Meath	O'Connor Park, Tullamore; Attendance: 10,171; Referee: Barry Cassidy (Derry)
10 June 2012; 2:00pm Quarter-final	JJ Smith 1-5 (4f), Brian Murphy 0-3 (2f), Brendan Murphy, D Foley, P Reid, D St Ledger (f) 0-1 each	Report	C Ward 1-3 (2f), B Farrell 0-4, G Reilly 0-3, D Tobin, M Burke 0-1 each	O'Connor Park, Tullamore; Attendance: 10,171; Referee: Barry Cassidy (Derry)

16 June 2012; 7:00pm Quarter-final replay	Meath	2-21 - 1-9	Carlow	O'Connor Park, Tullamore; Attendance: 5,070; Referee: D Fahy (Longford)
16 June 2012; 7:00pm Quarter-final replay	Brian Farrell 0-8, P Byrne 2-0, Graham Reilly 0-4, A Forde, D Carroll, J Queeney 0-2 each, B Menton, C Gillespie, C Ward 0-1 each	Report	JJ Smith 0-5, K Jackson 1-0, K Nolan, Brendan Murphy, D Foley, Brian Murphy 0-1 each	O'Connor Park, Tullamore; Attendance: 5,070; Referee: D Fahy (Longford)

17 June 2012; 4:00pm Quarter-final	Offaly	0-6 - 0-19	Kildare	O'Moore Park, Portlaoise; Attendance: 16,178; Referee: P O'Sullivan (Kerry)
17 June 2012; 4:00pm Quarter-final	K Casey 0-3 (1f), A McNamee, A Sullivan, N Smith 0-1 each	Report	M Conway 0-5 (4f, 1 '45'), J Doyle 0-4, O Lyons 0-3, E O'Flaherty 0-2, R Kelly, P O’Neill, J Kavanagh, A Smith, Padraig Fogarty 0-1 each	O'Moore Park, Portlaoise; Attendance: 16,178; Referee: P O'Sullivan (Kerry)

== Semi-finals ==
1 July 2012; 2:00pm Semi-final	Meath	1-17 - 1-11	Kildare	Croke Park, Dublin; Attendance: 47,961; Referee: M Collins (Cork); Man of the Match: Conor Gillespie (Summerhill)
1 July 2012; 2:00pm Semi-final	Brian Farrell 0-6 (4f), Peadar Byrne 1-0, Graham Reilly and Joe Sheridan (1 '45) 0-3 each, Jamie Queeney 0-2, Damien Carroll, Alan Forde, Stephen Bray 0-1 each	Report	Mikey Conway 1-1 (0-1f), Alan Smith and Eoghan O'Flaherty (0-2f, 1 '45) 0-3 each, Emmet Bolton, John Doyle, James Kavanagh, Tomas O'Connor 0-1 each;	Croke Park, Dublin; Attendance: 47,961; Referee: M Collins (Cork); Man of the Match: Conor Gillespie (Summerhill)

1 July 2012; 4:00pm Semi-final	Dublin	2-11 - 1-10	Wexford	Croke Park, Dublin; Attendance: 47,961; Referee: R Hickey (Clare); Man of the Match: Kevin McManamon (St Jude's)
1 July 2012; 4:00pm Semi-final	Kevin McManamon 1-3, Diarmuid Connolly 1-1, Kevin Nolan and Bryan Cullen 0-2 each, Stephen Cluxton (0-1f), Alan Brogan, Bernard Brogan (0-1f) 0-1 each	Report	Redmond Barry 1-1, Ben Brosnan 0-4, Adrian Flynn and Shane Roche (0-2f) 0-2 each, PJ Banville 0-1	Croke Park, Dublin; Attendance: 47,961; Referee: R Hickey (Clare); Man of the Match: Kevin McManamon (St Jude's)

== Final ==
22 July 2012
4:00pm
Final

Dublin	2-13 - 1-13	Meath
B Brogan (4f) 1-7, D Bastick 1-0, A Brogan, E O’Gara 0-2 each, K McManamon, J McCarthy 0-1 each	Report	B Farrell (6f) 0-7, J Queeney 1-0, G Reilly 0-3, S Bray, J Sheridan (‘45’), D Tobin 0-1 each

Croke Park, Dublin
Attendance: 69, 656
Referee: Marty Duffy (Sligo)
