= 2012 Leinster Senior Football Championship final =

2012 Leinster Football Final
- Event: 2012 Leinster Senior Football Championship
| Dublin | Meath |
| 2-13 | 1–13 |
- Date: 22 July 2012
- Venue: Croke Park, Dublin
- Referee: Marty Duffy (Sligo)
- Attendance: 69,657

The 2012 Leinster Senior Football Championship Final was the final game of the 2012 Leinster Senior Football Championship which saw Dublin claim their seventh title in eight years against rivals Meath.

== Route to the final ==
Preliminary round: Meath 0-16 Wicklow 0–11; Dublin (bye)
Quarter-finals: Dublin 2-22 Louth 0–12; Meath 2-21 Carlow 1-9
Semi-finals: Dublin 2-11 Wexford 1–10; Meath 1-11 Kildare 1-11

== Match details ==
22 July 2012
16:00 UTC+1

| Dublin | 2-13 - 1-13 | Meath |
|---|---|---|
| B Brogan 1-07 (0-04f), D Bastick 1-00, A Brogan, E O'Gara 0-02 each, K McManamon, J McCarthy 0-01 each | Report | B Farrell 0-07 (0-06f), J Queeney 1-00, G Reilly 0-03, S Bray, J Sheridan (0-01 ‘45’), D Tobin 0-01 each |

Croke Park, Dublin
Attendance: 69,657
Referee: Marty Duffy (Sligo)

| Dublin | Meath |
