= John Mooney =

John, Johnny, Jack, or Jackie Mooney may refer to:

== Sports ==
- J. D. Mooney (John David Mooney, 1901–1966), American jockey and trainer
- John J. Mooney (horse racing) (1924–1994), Canadian horse racing executive
- Johnny Mooney (footballer) (1926–2000), Scottish footballer
- Jackie Mooney (1938–2017), Irish soccer player
- Johnny Mooney (born 1958), Irish Gaelic footballer
- John Mooney (canoeist) (born 1964), American sprint canoer
- John Mooney (cricketer) (born 1982), Irish cricketer
- John Mooney (basketball) (born 1998), American basketball player

== Others ==
- John Mooney (historian) (1862–1950), Scottish historian
- Sir John Mooney (Irish politician) (1874–1934)
- John J. Mooney (1929–2020), American chemical engineer
- John Mooney (Canadian politician) (1933–2003)
- John Mooney (musician) (born 1955), American blues guitarist
- John Mooney (activist) (born 1966), American trade union leader
- John David Mooney, American artist
