= John Mooney (activist) =

- Born: September 4, 1966 (age 59)
- Citizenship: American
- Known for: Vice-Presidency of TWU Local 100
- Political party: Independence Party of New York
- Board member of: none currently

John Mooney (born September 4, 1966) is a former vice-president of the Transport Workers Union (TWU) Local 100, the union of New York City Transit Authority employees in New York City.

== Trade Union work ==
Mooney explained that he had become a member of the TWU Executive Board by running an outside campaign and defeating the official candidate for that position.

=== 2005 strike action ===
Mooney champions the rights of the common man, accordingly he objected strenuously on December 22, 2005, when Local 100 led by Roger Toussaint declared an end to the three-day strike. Mooney was one of only 4 of the 42 members of the Executive Committee of Local 100 who voted to continue the strike.

When asked for his opinion on Roger Toussaint's decision to end the 3 day strike
"It's a disgrace. We had their backs against the wall. We were going to win. They had no choice but to give in to our demands. Then, they called off the strike. They did not give us any details. I was not allowed to speak."

— John Mooney on a TV interview (2005)

=== Election for Recording Secretary of the Union ===
In December 2006, John Mooney ran for Recording Secretary under the Union Democracy slate and came in fourth behind Roger Toussaint's One Union slate, the Rail & Bus United slate and the Fresh Start slate. He has since gone back to working as a station agent in Brooklyn after losing a 2009 election for executive board, losing a 2012 election for executive board and division chairman and winning a 2015 election for station agent section chairman.

== Personal life ==
Mooney resides in the Sheepshead Bay section of Brooklyn. Mooney is a registered member of the Independence Party of New York.

He often appears as a guest on the John Baxter Show, on Brooklyn Community Access Television.

== See also ==
- 1966 New York City transit strike
- 1980 New York City transit strike
- Trade unions
