= Meanie =

Meanie may refer to:

- Meanie (snack), a brand of KP Snacks
- The Meanies, an Australian punk rock group
- Green Meanie, a character from Scream Queens
- Drymonema larsoni, also known as a "Pink meanie"
- Screamin' Meanie, a toy that is part of the toy series Madballs
- Meanie, a childish insult describing a mean person
- Little Miss Meanie, the 16th episode of the 19th season of Arthur

== See also ==
- Blue Meanie (disambiguation)
