= Blue Meanie =

Blue Meanie(s) may refer to:

== In fiction ==
- Blue Meanies (Yellow Submarine), fictional music-hating creatures in the films Yellow Submarine and Across the Universe
- Blue Meanies, fictional cat-like creatures in Katherine Applegate's book series Remnants

== Other ==
- Blue Meanies (Illinois band), an American ska-core band founded in Carbondale, Illinois
- Blue Meanies (Canadian band), later known as New Meanies
- Blue Meanies (Apple Computer), a former engineering group within Apple Computer
- The Blue Meanie, real name Brian Heffron, a professional wrestler
- "Blue Meanie", a slang term for police officers
- "Blue Meanies From Outer Space", a game on the VIC20
- "Blue Meanie", a nickname for Holden Dealer Team special edition of the Holden VK Commodore
- "Blue Meanies" a nickname for Panaeolus cyanescens, a psychoactive mushroom
