= Mooney =

Origin
- Language: Irish
- Origin: Ó Maonaigh
- Meaning: "rich" or "descendant of the wealthy one"

Other names
- Variant forms: Moony, O'Moony, Moon, Money, Moonie, Mainey, Mauney, Meaney and Meeney

Mooney is a family name which is probably predominantly derived from the Irish Ó Maonaigh, pronounced Om-weeneey. It can also be spelled Moony, Moonie, Mainey, Meaney and Meeney depending on the dialectic pronunciation that was anglicised.

== Origins ==
The origin of the Moony or Mooney families is lost in antiquity. The name is derived from maoin, a Gaelic word meaning wealth or treasure of treasure, hence when O'Maonaigh was anglicised to Mooney it meant the descendant of the wealthy one.

According to Irish lore, the Mooney family comes from one of the largest and most noble Irish lines. They are said to be descendants of the ancient Irish King Heremon, who, along with his brother Herber, conquered Ireland. Heremon slew his brother shortly after their invasion, took the throne for himself, and fathered a line of kings of Ireland that include Malachi II, and King Niall of the Nine Hostages.

Baptismal records, parish records, ancient land grants, the Annals of the Four Masters, and books by O'Hart, McLysaght, and O'Brien were all used in researching the history of the Mooney family name. These varied and often ancient records indicate that distant septs of the name arose in several places throughout Ireland. The most known and most numerous sept came from the county of Offaly. The members of this sept were from Chieftain Monach, son of Ailill Mor, Lord of Ulster, who was descended from the Kings of Connacht. These family members gave their name to town lands called Ballymooney both in that county and in the neighbouring county of Leix.

== People with the surname ==
- Al Mooney (1906–1986), aircraft designer and founder of Mooney Airplane Company
- Alex Mooney (born 1971), member of Congress from West Virginia
- Anna Mooney Burch (c. 1862–1905), American soprano
- Bel Mooney (born 1946), English journalist and broadcaster
- Brian Mooney (born 1966), Irish football player
- C. P. J. Mooney (1865–1926), American newspaper publisher
- Cameron Mooney (born 1979), Australian rules footballer
- Carol Ann Mooney (fl. 1970s–2010s), president of Saint Mary's College in Notre Dame, Indiana
- Charles Mooney (boxer) (born 1951), American boxer
- Charles A. Mooney (1879–1931), American businessman and politician
- Charles ("Chuck") W. Mooney Jr. (born 1947), American, the Charles A. Heimbold Jr. Professor of Law, and former interim dean, at the University of Pennsylvania Law School
- Chris Mooney (basketball) (born 1972), American basketball coach
- Darnell Mooney (born 1997), American football player
- Darrin Mooney (born 1967), English musician and session drummer
- Dave Mooney (born 1984), Irish football player
- Debra Mooney (born 1947), American actress
- Edward Aloysius Mooney (1882–1958), Roman Catholic Cardinal Archbishop of Detroit, former Bishop of Rochester
- Edward F. Mooney (born 1941), American philosopher, Kierkegaard scholar and Professor of Religion at Syracuse University
- Francie Mooney (1922–2006), musician, fiddler
- Hercules Mooney (1715–1800), American Revolutionary War colonel
- James Mooney (1861–1921), American anthropologist whose major works were about Native American Indians
- Jason Mooney (disambiguation), multiple people
- John Mooney (disambiguation), multiple people
- Kathi Mooney (fl. 2010s–2020s), American scientist
- Kevin Mooney (born 1962), English-Irish bassist and guitarist
- Kyle Mooney (born 1984), American comic actor, Saturday Night Live
- Malcolm Mooney (born 1944), original lead singer of rock group Can
- Matt Mooney (born 1997), American basketball player
- Melvin Mooney (1893–1968), American physicist, developed the Mooney viscometer and other testing equipment used in the rubber industry
- Paschal Mooney (born 1947), Irish politician
- Peter Mooney (conductor) (1915–1983), Scottish educationalist and conductor (music)
- Peter Mooney (footballer) (1897–?), English professional footballer
- Peter Mooney (actor) (born 1983), Canadian actor.
- Paul Mooney (writer) (1904–1939), American journalist, son of James Mooney
- Paul Mooney (comedian) (1941–2021), American comedian, writer, and actor
- Ralph Mooney (1928–2011), Bakersfield sound steel-guitar player
- Robert Mooney (1873–1953), Canadian politician
- Sean Mooney (born 1959), American sports reporter and former WWF announcer
- Shay Mooney (fl. 2010s–2020s), singer of country duo Dan + Shay
- Shona Mooney (born c. 1984), Scottish fiddler
- Ted Mooney (1951–2022), American author
- Thomas Mooney (1882–1942), American labour leader from San Francisco, California
- Tim Mooney (1958–2012), American musician
- Tom Mooney (rugby league) (born 1952), Australian rugby league footballer
- Tommy Mooney (born 1971), English football player
- Tony Mooney (fl. 1970s–2010s), Australian politician
- Walter E. Mooney (1925–1990), American pilot and model aircraft designer

== Fictional characters ==
- "Albert Mooney" is a character in the Irish folk-song "I'll Tell Me Ma"
- "Officer Mooney" is a police officer who interacts with Superman in the 1978 movie
- "Theodore J. Mooney" was a comedic foil to Luciell Ball in "The Lucy Show"
- "DI Jack Mooney" was a detective in the series "Death in Paradise"
