= Moonie (surname) =

Moonie is a surname. Notable people with the surname include:

- Jeff Moonie Jr., American film director
- Lewis Moonie (born 1947), British politician
- P.J. Moonie (1936–2016), Australian radio operator
