= Jason Mooney =

Jason Mooney may refer to:

- Jason Mooney (Australian footballer) (born 1973), Australian rules footballer
- Jason Mooney (Northern Irish footballer) (born 1989), Northern Irish professional footballer
