= Adrian Marren =

Irish Gaelic footballer

Personal information
- Born: Sligo, Ireland

Sport
- Sport: Gaelic football
- Position: Corner forward
Club
- Years: Club
- ?–: Curry
Club titles
- Sligo titles: 3
- Connacht titles: 0
- All-Ireland Titles: 0
Inter-county
- Years: County
- 2004–2020: Sligo
Inter-county titles
- Connacht titles: 1

Adrian Marren is a Gaelic footballer from Ireland. Marren plays for the Curry club and previously for the Sligo county team.

Marren was part of the Sligo team that won the Connacht title in 2007.

He was also man-of-the-match in a 2012 Connacht Senior Football Championship victory over Galway in which he scored 2–6.

In October 2020, Marren announced his retirement from inter-county football after 16 years.

== Honours ==
- Connacht Senior Football Championship (1): 2007
