= Sean McCormack (Gaelic footballer) =

Irish Gaelic footballer

Personal information
- Born: County Longford, Ireland

Sport
- Sport: Gaelic football
- Position: Forward
Club
- Years: Club
- 2000's-: Killoe Young Emmets
Club titles
- Longford titles: 4
- Leinster titles: 0
- All-Ireland Titles: 0
Inter-county
- Years: County
- 2006-2018: Longford

Sean McCormack is a Gaelic footballer from County Longford, Ireland. He plays for the Longford county team. In 2012, he was Man of the Match as Longford won the Division 3 National League title with a win over Wexford in the final, it was his second title having helped his side win the 2011 Div 4 title.

McCormack ended up as the joint top scorer in the entire 2013 National Football League along with Dublin star Bernard Brogan. Seán clocked up a total of 4 goals and 32 points from seven league games which was only eventually equaled by Brogan in the Division 1 League Final of 2013.

He plays his club football with the Killoe Young Emmets club. He won four County Senior Football Championship titles with the club in 2012, 2014, 2015 and 2019, captaining the team in 2019. He also helped Killoe to win five Longford Senior Football League (Leader Cup) titles in 2005, 2010, 2012, 2014 and 2015.
