= Kevin Meaney (Gaelic footballer) =

Irish Gaelic footballer

Personal information
- Native name: Caoimhin Ó Maonaí (Irish)
- Nickname: Digger
- Born: Wolfhill, County Laois
- Height: 6 ft 2 in (188 cm)

Sport
- Sport: Gaelic football
- Position: Midfield
Club
- Years: Club
- Arles–Kilcruise
Inter-county
- Years: County
- 2007–2017: Laois
Inter-county titles
- Leinster titles: 1

Kevin Meaney is a Gaelic footballer from County Laois.

Despite never playing for Laois at minor level, Meaney's consistent club performance earned him a call up to the under 21 squad in 2006, and he was part of the Laois team that won the Leinster U21 Football Championship.

New Laois senior manager Liam Kearns called Meaney on to the Laois senior squad for the 2007 O'Byrne Cup campaign.

== Honours ==
- 1 Leinster Under-21 Football Championship 2006
