= Ian Ryan =

Gaelic football player from County Limerick

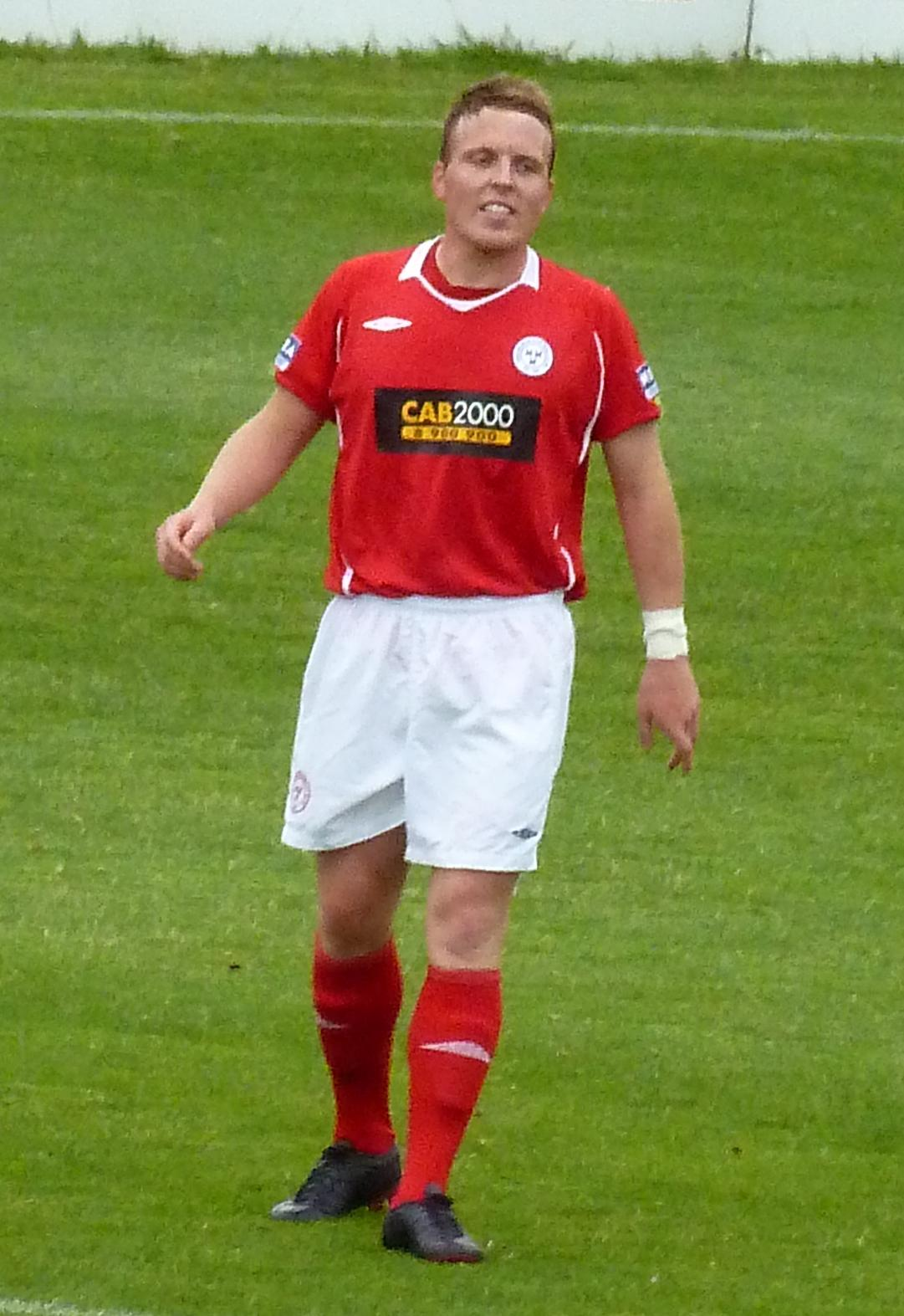

Personal information
- Born: County Limerick, Ireland

Sport
- Sport: Gaelic football
- Position: Full Forward
Club
- Years: Club
- St Senan’s
Inter-county
- Years: County
- 2008-: Limerick
Inter-county titles
- Munster titles: 0
- All-Irelands: 0
- NFL: 1 div 4
- All Stars: 0

Ian Ryan is a Gaelic footballer from County Limerick, Ireland. He has played with the Limerick team since 2008. In his first year at senior level he helped Limerick to a famous won 4–12 to 4–3 over Meath a game in which he scored 3–7. He finished the year with 3–20 from 4 games. He was later nominated for the All Stars Young Footballer of the Year. In 2009, he helped Limerick to a first Munster Final since 2004 but lost out by a point to Cork. In 2010 he helped Limerick to a National Football League Div 4 title, that same year he also played in a second Munster Final but was again on the losing side this time to Kerry.

He was for a time linked with a move to Aussie Rules however nothing ever came of it.

In 2008 he helped Munster to win the Railway Cup.

He plays his club football with St Senan's. He was part of the side that made it to the 2006 County Final but lost out to Fr Caseys.
