= All-Ireland Senior B Football Championship =

Annual Gaelic football competition

- Code: Gaelic football
- Founded: 1990
- Abolished: 2000
- Region: Ireland (GAA)
- No. of teams: 8–16
- Last Title holders: Fermanagh (2nd title)
- First winner: Leitrim
- Most titles: Fermanagh (2 titles)

The All-Ireland Senior B Football Championship was a Gaelic football competition held between 1990 and 2000 and organised by the Gaelic Athletic Association (GAA). It was contested by those county teams which were typically defeated in the early rounds of their provincial championships in the All-Ireland Senior Football Championship.

The championship was first contested in 1990, when Leitrim became the inaugural winner.

Designed to improve the standard of football in counties which were not as strong as others, the competition was held for the last time in 2000, as a result of the introduction of the All-Ireland Qualifiers for the 2001 football championship. This new qualifier system gave each defeated county a second chance via the "back-door", after losing in the provincial championships.

== Format ==
The championship was played on a straight knockout basis, typically starting in October each year alongside the National League fixtures, then concluding in November or December.

== Roll of honour ==
=== By county ===
County	Title(s)	Runners-up	Years won	Years runner-up
Fermanagh	2	2	1996, 2000	1998, 1999
Clare	1	1	1991	1997
Wicklow	1	1	1992	2000
Antrim	1	1	1999	1992
Leitrim	1	0	1990	—
Laois	1	0	1993	—
Carlow	1	0	1994	—
Tipperary	1	0	1995	—
Louth	1	0	1997	—
Monaghan	1	0	1998	—

=== By province ===
Province	Titles	Runners-up	Total
Leinster	4	5	9
Ulster	4	3	7
Munster	2	1	3
Connacht	1	2	3

== List of Finals ==
=== List of Senior B finals ===
Year	Date	Winners		Runners-up		Venue	Winning Margin	Winning Captain	Winning Manager
Year	Date	County	Score	County	Score	Venue	Winning Margin	Winning Captain	Winning Manager
2000	19 November	Fermanagh	3-15	Wicklow	2-06	Páirc Tailteann	12	Tom Brewster	John Maughan
1999	5 December	Antrim	2-10	Fermanagh	1-10	Casement Park	3	Anto Finnegan	Brian White
1998	22 November	Monaghan	2-11	Fermanagh	0-13	Scotstown	4	Edwin Murphy	Éamonn McEneaney
1997	9 November	Louth	1-11	Clare	1-08	Duggan Park	3	Gareth O'Neill	Paddy Clarke
1996	8 December	Fermanagh	0-12	Longford	0-09*	Páirc Seán Mac Diarmada	3	Cormac McAdam	Pat King
1995	27 August	Tipperary	2-12	Longford	2-05	St Brendan's Park, Birr	7	Philly Ryan	Séamus McCarthy
1994	20 November	Carlow	2-10	Westmeath	1-11	O'Connor Park	2	Hughie Brennan	Bobby Miller
1993	14 November	Laois	0-17	Sligo	0-05	Pearse Park	12	Denis Lalor	Colm Browne
1992	6 December	Wicklow	1-05	Antrim	0-04	Páirc Tailteann	4	Kevin O'Brien	Niall Rennick
1991	17 November	Clare	1-12	Longford	0-09**	Duggan Park	6	Gerry Killeen	John Maughan
1990	11 November	Leitrim	2-11	Sligo	0-02	Dr Hyde Park	15	Mickey Quinn	P.J. Carroll

=== Notes ===
* Replay | ** AET

== See also ==
- All-Ireland Senior Football Championship
- Tommy Murphy Cup (2004–2008)
- Tailteann Cup (2022–present)
