= Kieran Donnelly =

Fermanagh Gaelic footballer and manager

Kieran Donnelly (born 1975/1976) is an Irish Gaelic football coach. He has been manager of St Eunan's since 2025, after managing the Fermanagh county team between 2021 and 2025. Before becoming a coach Kieran was a professional footballer.

== Career ==
Donnelly played inter-county football for Fermanagh. He made his debut for Fermanagh under Pat King in 1996, and went on to win an All-Ireland Senior B Championship and a Dr McKenna Cup. He went toe-to-toe with Cavan the year the team won the 1997 Ulster Senior Football Championship Final, and he played in Division 1 of the National Football League under managers Dominic Corrigan and John Maughan.

After playing for Fermanagh, Donnelly managed the minor team and also helped train the senior side when Peter Canavan was in charge. Donnelly worked under Canavan when Canavan was Fermanagh manager. Donnelly was in fact Fermanagh assistant manager when Canavan was there.

Before he became Fermanagh manager, Donnelly managed Scotstown to the 2018 Ulster Senior Club Football Championship final. Immediately before his appointment as Fermanagh manager, Donnelly was working with Cavan Gaels.

He was appointed manager of St Eunan's in December 2025, having left the Fermanagh job the previous August.

== Personal life ==
Donnelly is a native of Brookeborough. When he was appointed as Fermanagh manager in 2021, Donnelly was 45 years of age and had spent 21 years teaching at Omagh CBS. He has coached the school team.
