= 2015 National Football League (Ireland) =

Gaelic football competition

League details
- Dates: 31 January – 26 April 2015
- Teams: 32

League champions
- Winners: Dublin (11th win)
- Captain: Stephen Cluxton
- Manager: Jim Gavin

League runners-up
- Runners-up: Cork
- Captain: Michael Shields
- Manager: Brian Cuthbert

Other division winners
- Division 2: Roscommon
- Division 3: Armagh
- Division 4: Offaly

The 2015 National Football League known for sponsorship reasons as the Allianz National Football League was the 84th staging of the National Football League (NFL), an annual Gaelic football tournament for the Gaelic Athletic Association county teams of Ireland. The League began on Saturday 31 January 2015. Thirty-one Gaelic football county teams from the island of Ireland, plus London, participated. TG4 and Setanta provided live coverage of the league with highlights shown on RTÉ2 on Sunday nights.

Dublin won their third title in a row and twelfth in total after a 1–21 to 2–07 win against Cork in the final on 26 April at Croke Park.

== Format ==
=== League structure ===
The 2015 format of the National Football League was a system of four divisions of eight teams. Each team played every other team in its division once, either home or away. 2 points were awarded for a win and 1 for a draw.

=== Tie-breaker ===
If only two teams were level on league points -

- The team that won the head-to-head match was ranked first
- If this game was a draw, score difference (total scored minus total conceded in all games) was used to rank the teams
- If score difference was identical, total scored was used to rank the teams
- If the two teams were still level, a play-off was required

If three or more teams were level on league points, points difference was used to rank the teams.

=== Finals, promotions and relegations ===
The top four teams in Division 1 contested the 2015 NFL semi-finals (first played fourth and second played third) and final. The top two teams in divisions 2, 3 and 4 were promoted, and contested the finals of their respective divisions. The bottom two teams in divisions 1, 2 and 3 were relegated.

== Division 1 ==
=== Table ===
Compete in Division 1 semi-finals
Automatic relegation to Division 2

Team	Pld	W	D	L	F	A	Diff	Pts
Cork	7	5	0	2	10-89	7-90	8	10
Dublin	7	4	1	2	7-93	2-78	30	9
Monaghan	7	4	0	3	4-86	7-84	-7	8
Donegal	7	3	1	3	6-75	5-70	8	7
Mayo	7	3	1	3	8-79	7-79	3	7
Kerry	7	3	1	3	6-88	9-90	-11	7
Tyrone	7	1	3	3	3-76	6-81	-14	5
Derry	7	1	1	5	4-75	5-89	-17	3

^{1}Donegal, Mayo and Kerry are ranked by points difference.

=== Rounds 1 to 7 ===
31/01/15; Round 1	Tyrone	0-09 – 1-13	Monaghan	Healy Park, Omagh; Referee: P Hughes
31/01/15; Round 1	D McCurry (0-4), P Hughes (0-2), A McCrory (0-1), N Morgan (0-1), S Cavanagh (0-1)	Report	S Gollogly (1-1), D McKenna (0-2), D Mone (0-2), K Hughes (0-2), P Finlay (0-2), C McManus (0-1), D Hughes (0-1), D Malone (0-1), R McAnespie (0-1)	Healy Park, Omagh; Referee: P Hughes

31/01/15; Round 1	Donegal	1-15 – 0-12	Derry	MacCumhail Park, Ballybofey; Referee: Marty Duffy
31/01/15; Round 1	M Murphy (0-5), P McBrearty (0-5), O MacNiallais (1-0), C Toye (0-2), M O'Reilly (0-2), M McElhinney (0-1)	Report	M Lynch (0-6), B Heron (0-1), B McGoldrick (0-1), C McAtamney (0-1), E Bradley (0-1), E Lynn (0-1), E McGuckin (0-1)	MacCumhail Park, Ballybofey; Referee: Marty Duffy

01/02/15; Round 1	Cork	1-15 – 0-16	Dublin	Páirc Uí Rinn, Cork; Referee: R Hickey
01/02/15; Round 1	C O'Neill (0-5), B Hurley (0-3), J O'Sullivan (1-0), C Dorman (0-2), J O'Rourke (0-2), E Cadogan (0-1), F Goold (0-1), M Collins (0-1)	Report	D Rock (0-8), E O'Gara (0-2), K McManamon (0-2), C Costello (0-1), M Deegan (0-1), S Carthy (0-1), T Brady (0-1)	Páirc Uí Rinn, Cork; Referee: R Hickey

01/02/15; Round 1	Kerry	0-10 – 2-11	Mayo	Fitzgerald Stadium, Killarney; Referee: M Deegan
01/02/15; Round 1	BJ Keane (0-4), D Moran (0-2), P Geaney (0-2), K O'Leary (0-1), M Geaney (0-1)	Report	M Conroy (0-4), J Doherty (0-3), A Freeman (1-0), K McLoughlin (1-0), D O'Connor (0-1), D Vaughan (0-1), E Regan (0-1), S O'Shea (0-1)	Fitzgerald Stadium, Killarney; Referee: M Deegan

07/02/15; Round 2	Dublin	2-10 – 0-11	Donegal	Croke Park, Dublin; Attendance: 22,968; Referee: M Deegan; Man of the Match: John Small
07/02/15; Round 2	D Rock (0-5), J McCaffrey (1-1), C Costello (1-0), C Kilkenny (0-1), Davy Byrne (0-1), E O'Conghaile (0-1), E O'Gara (0-1)	Report	M Murphy (0-4), P McBrearty (0-4), C Toye (0-2), C McFadden (0-1)	Croke Park, Dublin; Attendance: 22,968; Referee: M Deegan; Man of the Match: John Small

08/02/15; Round 2	Derry	0-13 – 1-17	Kerry	Celtic Park, Derry; Referee: J McQuillan
08/02/15; Round 2	E Bradley (0-4), C McFaul (0-2), D Heavron (0-2), M Lynch (0-2), B Heron (0-1), G O'Kane (0-1), K Johnston (0-1)	Report	P Geaney (1-5), B Sheehan (0-7), BJ Keane (0-2), S O'Brien (0-2), J Sherwood (0-1)	Celtic Park, Derry; Referee: J McQuillan

08/02/15; Round 2	Monaghan	1-16 – 2-14	Cork	St Mary's Park, Castleblayney; Referee: F Kelly
08/02/15; Round 2	C McManus (0-9), P Finlay (0-3), K Hughes (1-0), C Boyle (0-1), D Malone (0-1), F Kelly (0-1), K Duffy (0-1)	Report	C O'Neill (2-6), D O'Connor (0-5), B Hurley (0-1), B O'Driscoll (0-1), E Cadogan (0-1)	St Mary's Park, Castleblayney; Referee: F Kelly

08/02/15; Round 2	Mayo	1-07 – 1-11	Tyrone	MacHale Park, Castlebar; Referee: E Kinsella
08/02/15; Round 2	C O'Connor (1-2), J Doherty (0-2), K McLoughlin (0-1), M Conroy (0-1), M Ronaldson (0-1)	Report	D McCurry (0-4), P Harte (1-0), M Donnelly (0-2), N Morgan (0-2), C McShane (0-1), S Cavanagh (0-1), T McCann (0-1)	MacHale Park, Castlebar; Referee: E Kinsella

28/02/15; Round 3	Tyrone	0-11 – 1-08	Derry	Healy Park, Omagh; Referee: D Coldrick
28/02/15; Round 3	D McCurry (0-4), S Cavanagh (0-3), C Cavanagh (0-1), C McAliskey (0-1), M Donnelly (0-1), PJ Lavery (0-1)	Report	T O'Brien (1-0), E Bradley (0-2), J Kielt (0-2), B Heron (0-1), C McWilliams (0-1), M McIver (0-1), SL McGoldrick (0-1)	Healy Park, Omagh; Referee: D Coldrick

01/03/15; Round 3	Kerry	0-15 – 1-10	Dublin	Fitzgerald Stadium, Killarney; Referee: E Kinsella
01/03/15; Round 3	B Sheehan (0-6), BJ Keane (0-2), J Buckley (0-2), S O'Brien (0-2), D Moran (0-1), M Geaney (0-1), P Geaney (0-1)	Report	B Brogan (1-2), J McCaffrey (0-2), C Kilkenny (0-1), D Rock (0-1), E O'Gara (0-1), K McManamon (0-1), S Carthy (0-1), T Brady (0-1)	Fitzgerald Stadium, Killarney; Referee: E Kinsella

01/03/15; Round 3	Donegal	0-12 – 1-08	Cork	Fr Tierney Park, Ballyshannon; Referee: J McQuillan
01/03/15; Round 3	M O'Reilly (0-4), M Murphy (0-3), P McBrearty (0-3), C Toye (0-1), O MacNiallais (0-1)	Report	C O'Neill (0-4), Tomas Clancy (1-0), B Hurley (0-1), D O'Connor (0-1), K O'Driscoll (0-1), M Collins (0-1)	Fr Tierney Park, Ballyshannon; Referee: J McQuillan

01/03/15; Round 3	Mayo	3-15 – 0-11	Monaghan	MacHale Park, Castlebar; Referee: R Hickey
01/03/15; Round 3	A O'Shea (1-3), C O'Connor (0-5), M Ronaldson (0-3), A Freeman (1-0), M Sweeney (1-0), D O'Connor (0-1), J Doherty (0-1), K McLoughlin (0-1), S Coen (0-1)	Report	D McKenna (0-4), K Hughes (0-2), P Finlay (0-2), P Meegan (0-1), R Beggan (0-1), S Gollogly (0-1)	MacHale Park, Castlebar; Referee: R Hickey

07/03/15; Round 3	Dublin	1-09 – 0-12	Tyrone	Croke Park, Dublin; Attendance: 27,469; Referee: D Gough; Man of the Match: Dean Rock
07/03/15; Round 3	D Rock (1-6), B Brogan (0-1), E O Conghaile (0-1), P Flynn (0-1)	Report	S Cavanagh (0-4), D McCurry (0-2), B Tierney (0-1), J McMahon (0-1), M Bradley (0-1), M Donnelly (0-1), N Morgan (0-1), P McNulty (0-1)	Croke Park, Dublin; Attendance: 27,469; Referee: D Gough; Man of the Match: Dean Rock

08/03/15; Round 4	Donegal	1-04 – 0-09	Monaghan	O'Donnell Park, Letterkenny; Referee: P Hughes
08/03/15; Round 4	M Murphy (1-3), P McBrearty (0-1)	Report	P Finlay (0-4), C McManus (0-1), D Malone (0-1), F Kelly (0-1), K Hughes (0-1), R Beggan (0-1)	O'Donnell Park, Letterkenny; Referee: P Hughes

08/03/15; Round 4	Cork	3-17 – 2-09	Kerry	Páirc Uí Rinn, Cork; Referee: A Nolan
08/03/15; Round 4	C O'Neill (1-6), J O'Rourke (2-0), D O'Connor (0-4), K O'Driscoll (0-3), B Hurley (0-2), C Dorman (0-1), C O'Driscoll (0-1)	Report	BJ Keane (0-5), K Donaghy (1-0), T Walsh (1-0), A Fitzgerald (0-2), P Crowley (0-1), S O'Brien (0-1)	Páirc Uí Rinn, Cork; Referee: A Nolan

08/03/15; Round 4	Derry	1-13 – 2-12	Mayo	Celtic Park, Derry; Referee: C Branagan
08/03/15; Round 4	B Heron (0-4), J Kielt (0-4), B Og McGilligan (1-0), M Lynch (0-2), B Og McAlary (0-1), M Craig (0-1), T O'Brien (0-1)	Report	M Ronaldson (1-2), C O'Connor (0-4), A O'Shea (0-3), M Sweeney (1-0), K McLoughlin (0-2), J Doherty (0-1)	Celtic Park, Derry; Referee: C Branagan

14/03/15; Round 4	Mayo	0-10 – 2-18	Dublin	MacHale Park, Castlebar; Referee: P O'Sullivan; Man of the Match: Tomás Brady
14/03/15; Round 4	J Doherty (0-4), K McLoughlin (0-3), A Dillon (0-1), D Kirby (0-1), M Ronaldson (0-1)	Report	D Rock (0-6), B Brogan (1-1), T Brady (0-3), D Bastick (1-0), C Kilkenny (0-2), J McCaffrey (0-2), D Connolly (0-1), J Cooper (0-1), P Flynn (0-1), P Ryan (0-1)	MacHale Park, Castlebar; Referee: P O'Sullivan; Man of the Match: Tomás Brady

15/03/15; Round 5	Kerry	2-13 – 2-11	Donegal	Austin Stack Park, Tralee; Referee: R Hickey
15/03/15; Round 5	B Sheehan (0-6), BJ Keane (1-1), D Moran (1-1), A Fitzgerald (0-1), J Buckley (0-1), P Geaney (0-1), P Murphy (0-1), S O'Brien (0-1)	Report Report	M Murphy (1-3), P McBrearty (0-4), R McHugh (1-0), C McFadden (0-1), H McFadden (0-1), M McElhinney (0-1), N Gallagher (0-1)	Austin Stack Park, Tralee; Referee: R Hickey

15/03/15; Round 5	Tyrone	2-10 – 0-17	Cork	Healy Park, Omagh; Referee: Marty Duffy
15/03/15; Round 5	D McCurry (0-7), C McAliskey (1-3), P Harte (1-0)	Report	C O'Neill (0-8), B Hurley (0-2), D O'Connor (0-2), C Dorman (0-1), C O'Driscoll (0-1), D Og Hodnett (0-1), F Goold (0-1), M Collins (0-1)	Healy Park, Omagh; Referee: Marty Duffy

15/03/15; Round 5	Monaghan	0-15 – 0-10	Derry	St Tiernach's Park, Clones; Referee: S Hurson
15/03/15; Round 5	C McManus (0-6), D Mone (0-4), K Hughes (0-2), P Finlay (0-2), F Kelly (0-1)	Report	M Lynch (0-4), B Heron (0-2), C McWilliams (0-1), E Lynn (0-1), E McGuckin (0-1), J Kielt (0-1)	St Tiernach's Park, Clones; Referee: S Hurson

28/03/15; Round 6	Dublin	0-08 – 0-04	Derry	Croke Park, Dublin; Referee: C Lane
28/03/15; Round 6	D Rock (0-3), D Connolly (0-2), C Costello (0-1), M D Macauley (0-1), P Andrews (0-1)	Report	B Heron (0-1), E Lynn (0-1), J Kielt (0-1), M Lynch (0-1)	Croke Park, Dublin; Referee: C Lane

29/03/15; Round 6	Cork	2-07 – 0-12	Mayo	Páirc Uí Rinn, Cork; Referee: E Kinsella
29/03/15; Round 6	B Hurley (1-0), M Collins (1-0), C O'Neill (0-2), F Goold (0-2), C Dorman (0-1), D O'Connor (0-1), Tomas Clancy (0-1)	Report	T Parsons (0-3), J Doherty (0-2), K McLoughlin (0-2), A O'Shea (0-1), D Kirby (0-1), D Vaughan (0-1), M Ronaldson (0-1), S Coen (0-1)	Páirc Uí Rinn, Cork; Referee: E Kinsella

29/03/15; Round 6	Donegal	1-13 – 0-06	Tyrone	MacCumhail Park, Ballybofey; Referee: J McQuillan
29/03/15; Round 6	M Murphy (0-6), R McHugh (1-1), M McElhinney (0-2), F McGlynn (0-1), N McGee (0-1), O MacNiallais (0-1), P McBrearty (0-1)	Report	P Harte (0-2), C McAlliskey (0-1), D McCurry (0-1), R O'Neill (0-1), S Cavanagh (0-1)	MacCumhail Park, Ballybofey; Referee: J McQuillan

29/03/15; Round 6	Kerry	0-10 – 1-11	Monaghan	Austin Stack Park, Tralee; Referee: Marty Duffy
29/03/15; Round 6	P Geaney (0-4), B J Keane (0-2), D Moran (0-1), J Buckley (0-1), J Lyne (0-1), S O'Brien (0-1)	Report	C McManus (0-6), O Duffy (1-1), D Hughes (0-1), D Malone (0-1), P Finlay (0-1), R Beggan (0-1)	Austin Stack Park, Tralee; Referee: Marty Duffy

05/04/15; Round 7	Mayo	0-12 – 1-09	Donegal	MacHale Park, Castlebar; Referee: D Coldrick
05/04/15; Round 7	B Moran (0-3), K McLoughlin (0-3), J Doherty (0-2), A O'Shea (0-1), D O'Connor (0-1), D Vaughan (0-1), M Conroy (0-1)	Report	P McBrearty (1-3), O MacNiallais (0-3), C McFadden (0-1), M McElhinney (0-1), S Griffin (0-1)	MacHale Park, Castlebar; Referee: D Coldrick

05/04/15; Round 7	Derry	2-15 – 1-11	Cork	Owenbeg, Derry; Attendance: 909; Referee: C Reilly
05/04/15; Round 7	E Lynn (2-3), B Heron (0-3), Eoin Bradley (0-2), J Kielt (0-2), M Lynch (0-2), E McGuckin (0-1), K Johnston (0-1), N Holly (0-1)	Report	D Goulding (0-3), P Kerrigan (0-3), S O'Donoghue (1-0), C Dorman (0-1), C O'Neill (0-1), J Hayes (0-1), J O'Rourke (0-1), M Collins (0-1)	Owenbeg, Derry; Attendance: 909; Referee: C Reilly

05/04/15; Round 7	Monaghan	1-11 – 1-22	Dublin	St Tiernach's Park, Clones; Referee: M Deegan
05/04/15; Round 7	D Hughes (1-0), C McManus (0-2), O Duffy (0-2), R Beggan (0-2), K Hughes (0-1), P Finlay (0-1), R McAnespie (0-1), S Carey (0-1), T Kerr (0-1)	Report	D Rock (0-6), B Fenton (1-1), B Brogan (0-2), D Connolly (0-2), K McManamon (0-2), P Flynn (0-2), P McMahon (0-2), T Brady (0-2), D Byrne (0-1), E O Conghaile (0-1), J Cooper (0-1)	St Tiernach's Park, Clones; Referee: M Deegan

05/04/15; Round 7	Tyrone	0-17 – 1-14	Kerry	Healy Park, Omagh; Referee: J McQuillan
05/04/15; Round 7	D McCurry (0-7), S Cavanagh (0-6), Joe McMahon (0-1), M Donnelly (0-1), P Harte (0-1), R McNabb (0-1)	Report	P Geaney (1-2), B Sheehan (0-4), J Buckley (0-2), P Murphy (0-2), A Maher (0-1), D Moran (0-1), D O'Sullivan (0-1), K Donaghy (0-1)	Healy Park, Omagh; Referee: J McQuillan

=== Division 1 Semi-finals ===
12/04/15	Cork	4-11 – 0-19	Donegal	Croke Park, Dublin; Referee: Marty Duffy
12/04/15	C O'Neill (2-2), F Goold (0-4), B Hurley (1-1), Tom Clancy (1-0), C Dorman (0-1), C O'Driscoll (0-1), J O'Rourke (0-1), M Shields (0-1)	Report; Subs and scorers	M Murphy (0-8), P McBrearty (0-4), C McFadden (0-2), M McElhinney (0-2), A Thompson (0-1), K Lacey (0-1), O MacNiallais (0-1)	Croke Park, Dublin; Referee: Marty Duffy

12/04/15	Dublin	0-17 – 0-16	Monaghan	Croke Park, Dublin; Referee: R Hickey; Man of the Match: Conor McManus
12/04/15	D Rock (0-7), B Fenton (0-2), K McManamon (0-2), P McMahon (0-2), D Bastick (0-1), E O Conghaile (0-1), J McCaffrey (0-1), P Flynn (0-1)	Report	C McManus (0-8), D Clerkin (0-3), K Hughes (0-2), N McAdam (0-1), P Finlay (0-1), R Beggan (0-1)	Croke Park, Dublin; Referee: R Hickey; Man of the Match: Conor McManus

=== Division 1 Final ===
26/04/15	Dublin	1-21 – 2-7	Cork	Croke Park, Dublin; Referee: P Hughes; Man of the Match: Jack McCaffrey
26/04/15	D Rock (0-10), C Kilkenny (0-3), D Connolly (1-0), B Brogan (0-2), P Andrews (0-2), J McCaffrey (0-1), K McManamon (0-1), P McMahon (0-1), T Brady (0-1)	Report	C O'Neill (0-6), D Goulding (1-0), M Collins (1-0), B Hurley (0-1)	Croke Park, Dublin; Referee: P Hughes; Man of the Match: Jack McCaffrey

== Division 2 ==
=== Table ===
Compete in Division 2 final and automatic promotion to Division 1
Automatic relegation to Division 3

Team	Pld	W	D	L	F	A	Diff	Pts
Down	7	5	0	2	11-89	6-90	14	10
Roscommon	7	4	1	2	7-99	6-94	8	9
Meath	7	4	1	2	7-87	4-80	16	9
Galway	7	4	0	3	9-88	8-85	6	8
Cavan	7	3	1	3	1-85	7-66	1	7
Laois	7	2	1	4	8-80	5-92	-3	5
Westmeath	7	2	0	5	4-75	11-83	-29	4
Kildare	7	2	0	5	7-87	7-100	-13	4

^{1}Roscommon are placed ahead of Meath because they won the head-to-head game between the teams (2-10 to 0-14).

^{2}Westmeath are placed ahead of Kildare because they won the head-to-head game between the teams (0-15 to 0-12).

=== Rounds 1 to 7 ===
01/02/15; Round 1	Galway	2-13 – 1-12	Meath	Pearse Stadium, Salthill; Referee: P O'Sullivan
01/02/15; Round 1	D Cummins (1-3), S Walsh (1-3), E Hoare (0-2), P Varley (0-2), A Varley (0-1), F O Curraoin (0-1), S Denvir (0-1)		M Newman (0-5), P O'Rourke (0-3), J Queeney (1-0), S Bray (0-2), B Menton (0-1), G Reilly (0-1)	Pearse Stadium, Salthill; Referee: P O'Sullivan

01/02/15; Round 1	Roscommon	1-11 – 0-14	Cavan	Newpark, Kiltoom; Referee: Michael Duffy
01/02/15; Round 1	D Murtagh (0-5), C Murtagh (0-4), C Cregg (1-0), D Smith (0-1), E Smith (0-1)		G McKiernan (0-4), M Dunne (0-3), M Reilly (0-3), B Reilly (0-2), D McVeety (0-2)	Newpark, Kiltoom; Referee: Michael Duffy

01/02/15; Round 1	Westmeath	1-12 – 0-10	Laois	Cusack Park, Mullingar; Referee: D Gough
01/02/15; Round 1	R Connellan (0-5), G Egan (0-4), J Dolan (1-0), C McCormack (0-1), D Lynch (0-1), J Heslin (0-1)		D Kingston (0-3), E O'Carroll (0-2), D Strong (0-1), J Finn (0-1), J O'Loughlin (0-1), N Donoher (0-1), R Munnelly (0-1)	Cusack Park, Mullingar; Referee: D Gough

01/02/15; Round 1	Kildare	1-15 – 3-13	Down	St Conleth's Park, Newbridge; Referee: A Nolan
01/02/15; Round 1	D Mulhall (0-4), E O'Flaherty (0-4), F Dowling (0-4), N Kelly (1-1), P Fogarty (0-2)		D O'Hare (1-6), P Devlin (0-6), A McConville (1-0), C Mooney (1-0), D O'Hagan (0-1)	St Conleth's Park, Newbridge; Referee: A Nolan

07/02/15; Round 2	Laois	2-6 – 0-17	Cavan	O'Moore Park, Portlaoise; Referee: P Neilan
07/02/15; Round 2	D Kingston (2-2), R Munnelly (0-2), C Begley (0-1), D Strong (0-1)		N McDermott (0-5), B Reilly (0-2), D O'Reilly (0-2), J McEnroe (0-2), M Reilly (0-2), D McVeety (0-1), J Brady (0-1), M Dunne (0-1), P Smith (0-1)	O'Moore Park, Portlaoise; Referee: P Neilan

07/02/15; Round 2	Down	1-11 – 1-15	Roscommon	Páirc Esler, Newry; Referee: B Cassidy
07/02/15; Round 2	A McConville (1-1), D O'Hare (0-3), J Johnston (0-3), P Devlin (0-2), C Maginn (0-1), P Fitzpatrick (0-1)		D Murtagh (1-4), C Cregg (0-3), C Murtagh (0-2), C Cafferky (0-1), D Shine (0-1), D Smith (0-1), M Nally (0-1), N Daly (0-1), S Kilbride (0-1)	Páirc Esler, Newry; Referee: B Cassidy

07/02/15; Round 2	Meath	0-13 – 0-11	Kildare	Páirc Tailteann, Navan; Referee: C Branagan
07/02/15; Round 2	A Tormey (0-4), M Newman (0-3), S Tobin (0-2), A Flanagan (0-1), B Menton (0-1), P O'Rourke (0-1), S Bray (0-1)		D Mulhall (0-4), F Dowling (0-2), P O'Neill (0-2), E O'Flaherty (0-1), K Cribbin (0-1), M O'Grady (0-1)	Páirc Tailteann, Navan; Referee: C Branagan

08/02/15; Round 2	Westmeath	2-12 – 2-13	Galway	Cusack Park, Mullingar; Referee: C Reilly
08/02/15; Round 2	J Heslin (0-7), K Martin (1-1), G Egan (1-0), C McCormack (0-2), D Lynch (0-1), L Smith (0-1)		P Sweeney (1-5), D Cummins (0-3), S Walsh (1-0), A Varley (0-1), G O'Donnell (0-1), M Martin (0-1), P Varley (0-1), S Denvir (0-1)	Cusack Park, Mullingar; Referee: C Reilly

28/02/15; Round 3	Cavan	0-08 – 1-09	Down	Breffni Park, Cavan; Referee: P Hughes
28/02/15; Round 3	N McDermott (0-4), M Reilly (0-2), J McLoughlin (0-1), M Dunne (0-1)		D O'Hare (1-3), K McKernan (0-2), C McGovern (0-1), D Turley (0-1), J Johnston (0-1), L Howard (0-1)	Breffni Park, Cavan; Referee: P Hughes

01/03/15; Round 3	Kildare	0-12 – 0-15	Westmeath	St Conleth's Park, Newbridge; Referee: P O'Sullivan
01/03/15; Round 3	E O'Flaherty (0-5), D Flynn (0-1), D Mulhall (0-1), F Conway (0-1), F Dowling (0-1), P Cribbin (0-1), P Fogarty (0-1), P O'Neill (0-1)		J Heslin (0-6), D Glennon (0-3), L Smyth (0-2), G Egan (0-1), K Martin (0-1), P Sharry (0-1), S Dempsey (0-1)	St Conleth's Park, Newbridge; Referee: P O'Sullivan

07/03/15; Round 4	Meath	4-10 – 0-11	Westmeath	Páirc Tailteann, Navan; Referee: F Kelly
07/03/15; Round 4	G Reilly (1-5), M Newman (1-2), S Bray (1-1), P Harnan (1-0), A Tormey (0-1), P O'Rourke (0-1)		J Heslin (0-6), D Glennon (0-2), G Egan (0-2), J Gonoud (0-1)	Páirc Tailteann, Navan; Referee: F Kelly

07/03/15; Round 4	Cavan	0-14 – 2-13	Kildare	Breffni Park, Cavan; Referee: C Reilly
07/03/15; Round 4	N McDermott (0-6), G McKiernan (0-3), M Reilly (0-3), C Mackey (0-1), D McVeety (0-1)		E O'Flaherty (1-4), D Flynn (1-1), E Callaghan (0-2), N Kelly (0-2), P Cribbin (0-2), F Dowling (0-1), O Lyons (0-1)	Breffni Park, Cavan; Referee: C Reilly

08/03/15; Round 4	Laois	2-17 – 0-16	Roscommon	O'Moore Park, Portlaoise; Referee: J Henry
08/03/15; Round 4	D Kingston (0-6), P Kingston (1-2), R Munnelly (0-4), N Donoher (1-1), E O'Carroll (0-2), C Boyle (0-1), D Strong (0-1)		C Cregg (0-5), D Shine (0-3), C Murtagh (0-2), D Murtagh (0-2), U Harney (0-2), E Smith (0-1), N Daly (0-1)	O'Moore Park, Portlaoise; Referee: J Henry

08/03/15; Round 4	Down	1-17 – 1-16	Galway	Páirc Esler, Newry; Referee: P Neilan
08/03/15; Round 4	D O'Hare (1-5), P Devlin (0-4), C Laverty (0-3), M Poland (0-2), C Mooney (0-1), K McKernan (0-1), R McGarry (0-1)		M Martin (0-5), D Cummins (0-4), P Sweeney (1-0), A Varley (0-2), S Denvir (0-2), D Comer (0-1), G Bradshaw (0-1), P Conroy (0-1)	Páirc Esler, Newry; Referee: P Neilan

14/03/15; Round 5	Meath	0-13 – 0-13	Laois	Páirc Tailteann, Navan; Referee: M McNally
14/03/15; Round 5	M Newman (0-8), B Menton (0-2), E Wallace (0-1), G Reilly (0-1), S Bray (0-1)		D Kingston (0-5), J O'Loughlin (0-2), P Kingston (0-2), B Quigley (0-1), C Boyle (0-1), D Strong (0-1), R Munnelly (0-1)	Páirc Tailteann, Navan; Referee: M McNally

15/03/15; Round 5	Galway	0-10 – 0-12	Cavan	Pearse Stadium, Salthill; Referee: M Deegan
15/03/15; Round 5	M Martin (0-4), D Comer (0-3), P Conroy (0-2), D Cummins (0-1)		M Dunne (0-5), D McVeety (0-1), G McKiernan (0-1), J Brady (0-1), J McEnroe (0-1), M Reilly (0-1), N McDermott (0-1), T Corr (0-1)	Pearse Stadium, Salthill; Referee: M Deegan

15/03/15; Round 5	Westmeath	0-10 – 2-17	Down	Cusack Park, Mullingar; Referee: J Hickey
15/03/15; Round 5	J Heslin (0-4), S Dempsey (0-3), C McCormack (0-2), R Connellan (0-1)		D O'Hare (1-4), A McConville (1-2), C Laverty (0-4), M Poland (0-3), D O'Hanlon (0-2), K McKernan (0-1), P Devlin (0-1)	Cusack Park, Mullingar; Referee: J Hickey

15/03/15; Round 5	Kildare	2-12 – 0-24	Roscommon	St Conleth's Park, Newbridge; Referee: F Kelly
15/03/15; Round 5	E O'Flaherty (0-4), P Cribbin (0-4), E Callaghan (1-0), F Dowling (1-0), G White (0-2), A Smith (0-1), D Flynn (0-1)		C Cregg (0-6), C Murtagh (0-4), D Murtagh (0-4), S Kilbride (0-3), C Daly (0-2), C Compton (0-1), C Shine (0-1), E Smith (0-1), N Daly (0-1), U Harney (0-1)	St Conleth's Park, Newbridge; Referee: F Kelly

22/03/15; Round 3 refixture	Roscommon	2-10 – 0-14	Meath	Dr. Hyde Park, Roscommon; Referee: A Nolan
22/03/15; Round 3 refixture	D Murtagh (0-4), C Cregg (1-1), S Kilbride (1-0), D Shine (0-2), C Murtagh (0-1), D O'Malley (0-1), M Healy (0-1)		M Newman (0-7), G Reilly (0-2), D Bray (0-1), E Wallace (0-1), K Reilly (0-1), M O'Sullivan (0-1), P Harnan (0-1)	Dr. Hyde Park, Roscommon; Referee: A Nolan

22/03/15; Round 3 refixture	Galway	0-10 – 2-10	Laois	St Jarlath's Park, Tuam; Referee: Marty Duffy
22/03/15; Round 3 refixture	P O Griofa (0-4), S Walsh (0-3), A Varley (0-1), G O'Donnell (0-1), P Conroy (0-1)		D Kingston (1-5), R Munnelly (0-3), T Shiel (1-0), D Strong (0-1), S Attride (0-1)	St Jarlath's Park, Tuam; Referee: Marty Duffy

28/03/15; Round 6	Down	0-10 – 2-11	Meath	Páirc Esler, Newry; Referee: B Cassidy
28/03/15; Round 6	P Devlin (0-3), D O'Hare (0-2), K McKernan (0-2), C Mooney (0-1), D O'Hanlon (0-1), J Johnston (0-1)		B Menton (1-2), P Harnan (1-1), M O'Sullivan (0-3), C Gillespie (0-1), E Wallace (0-1), J Wallace (0-1), P O'Rourke (0-1), S O'Rourke (0-1)	Páirc Esler, Newry; Referee: B Cassidy

28/03/15; Round 6	Cavan	1-8 – 1-3	Westmeath	Breffni Park, Cavan; Referee: J Henry
28/03/15; Round 6	B Fitzpatrick (1-0), G McKiernan (0-2), M Dunne (0-2), M Reilly (0-2), N McDermott (0-2)		K Martin (1-2), J Heslin (0-1)	Breffni Park, Cavan; Referee: J Henry

28/03/15; Round 6	Laois	1-9 – 1-12	Kildare	O'Moore Park, Portlaoise; Referee: D O'Mahoney
28/03/15; Round 6	C Begley (1-1), D Kingston (0-3), N Donoher (0-2), D O'Connor (0-1), E O'Carroll (0-1), R Munnelly (0-1)		E Bolton (1-1), P Fogarty (0-3), E O'Flaherty (0-2), N Kelly (0-2), P Cribbin (0-2), A Smith (0-1), M Donnellan (0-1)	O'Moore Park, Portlaoise; Referee: D O'Mahoney

29/03/15; Round 6	Roscommon	1-10 – 1-14	Galway	Dr. Hyde Park, Roscommon; Referee: Michael Duffy
29/03/15; Round 6	D Murtagh (1-4), C Murtagh (0-2), E Smith (0-2), C Shine (0-1), M Breathnach (0-1)		P Og O Griofa (0-6), D Comer (1-2), P Conroy (0-3), G Sice (0-1), P Sweeney (0-1), S Denvir (0-1)	Dr. Hyde Park, Roscommon; Referee: Michael Duffy

05/04/15; Round 7	Westmeath	0-12 – 2-13	Roscommon	Cusack Park, Mullingar; Referee: F Kelly
05/04/15; Round 7	J Heslin (0-7), S Dempsey (0-2), D Glennon (0-1), G Egan (0-1), R Foley (0-1)		D Murtagh (0-4), C Daly (1-1), C Murtagh (0-3), S Kilbride (1-0), C Compton (0-1), D Smith (0-1), F Kelly (0-1), K Higgins (0-1), U Harney (0-1)	Cusack Park, Mullingar; Referee: F Kelly

05/04/15; Round 7	Down	3-12 – 1-15	Laois	Páirc Esler, Newry; Referee: R Hickey
05/04/15; Round 7	P Devlin (1-2), C Laverty (1-1), A McConville (1-0), C Maginn (0-2), C McGovern (0-2), C Mooney (0-2), D O'Hare (0-1), G Collins (0-1), M Poland (0-1)		E O'Carroll (0-7), R Munnelly (1-4), D Strong (0-1), J O'Loughlin (0-1), N Donoher (0-1), R Kehoe (0-1)	Páirc Esler, Newry; Referee: R Hickey

05/04/15; Round 7	Galway	3-12 – 1-12	Kildare	Pearse Stadium, Salthill; Referee: S Hurson
05/04/15; Round 7	S Walsh (2-1), P O Griofa (0-4), F O Curraoin (1-1), P Conroy (0-3), G Sice (0-1), M Breathnach (0-1), P Sweeney (0-1)		D Flynn (1-1), A Smith (0-2), G White (0-2), M Conway (0-2), P Cribbin (0-2), E Callaghan (0-1), E O'Flaherty (0-1), P Fogarty (0-1)	Pearse Stadium, Salthill; Referee: S Hurson

05/04/15; Round 7	Meath	0-14 – 0-12	Cavan	Páirc Tailteann, Navan; Referee: B Cassidy
05/04/15; Round 7	M Newman (0-6), S Bray (0-2), S O'Rourke (0-2), B Menton (0-1), E Wallace (0-1), J McEntee (0-1), M Burke (0-1)		M Dunne (0-3), M Reilly (0-3), D McVeety (0-1), D O'Reilly (0-1), G McKiernan (0-1), J McEnroe (0-1), N Murray (0-1), T Corr (0-1)	Páirc Tailteann, Navan; Referee: B Cassidy

=== Division 2 Final ===
26/04/15	Roscommon	1-17 – 0-15	Down	Croke Park, Dublin; Referee: M Deegan
26/04/15	C Connolly (0-5), C Murtagh (1-2), S Kilbride (0-4), C Cafferkey (0-1), C Cregg (0-1), D Murtagh (0-1), D Shine (0-1), D Smith (0-1), U Harney (0-1)	Report	D O'Hare (0-5), K McKernan (0-2), B McArdle (0-1), C Laverty (0-1), C Maginn (0-1), C Mooney (0-1), J Johnston (0-1), P Devlin (0-1), P Fitzpatrick (0-1), R Johnston (0-1)	Croke Park, Dublin; Referee: M Deegan

== Division 3 ==
=== Table ===
Compete in Division 3 final and automatic promotion to Division 2
Automatic relegation to Division 4

Team	Pld	W	D	L	F	A	Diff	Pts
Fermanagh	7	5	1	1	8-88	4-71	29	11
Armagh	7	5	1	1	11-76	5-75	19	11
Tipperary	7	4	0	3	9-92	11-66	20	8
Sligo	7	3	0	4	7-102	4-90	21	6
Clare	7	3	0	4	5-89	11-74	-3	6
Limerick	7	3	0	4	10-67	10-90	-23	6
Louth	7	2	0	5	9-78	9-104	-26	4
Wexford	7	2	0	5	6-69	11-91	-37	4

^{1}Armagh v. Fermanagh was a draw (1-10 each), so the teams are ranked by points difference.

^{2}Sligo, Clare and Limerick are ranked by points difference.

^{3}Louth are placed ahead of Wexford because they won the head-to-head game between the two teams (1-16 to 1-10).

=== Rounds 1 to 7 ===
31/01/15; Round 1	Fermanagh	0-16 – 0-07	Louth	Brewster Park, Enniskillen; Referee: S Hurson
31/01/15; Round 1	S Quigley (0-7), R Jones (0-3), B Mulrone (0-2), R Corrigan (0-2), D McCusker (0-1), P McCusker (0-1)		D Byrne (0-5), E O'Connor (0-1), R Burns (0-1)	Brewster Park, Enniskillen; Referee: S Hurson

01/02/15; Round 1	Clare	1-16 – 0-05	Wexford	Cusack Park, Ennis; Referee: D O'Mahoney
01/02/15; Round 1	D Tubridy (0-10), P Burke (1-2), G Brennan (0-1), J Malone (0-1), S Brennan (0-1), S Hickey (0-1)		B Brosnan (0-2), K O'Grady (0-2), C Lyng (0-1)	Cusack Park, Ennis; Referee: D O'Mahoney

01/02/15; Round 1	Limerick	0-14 – 1-09	Sligo	Newcastlewest GAA Field, Newcastlewest; Referee: C Lane
01/02/15; Round 1	M Lyons (0-4), S Buckley (0-3), C Sheehan (0-1), D Neville (0-1), I Corbett (0-1), P Nash (0-1), R Browne (0-1), T Lee (0-1), K Phair (0-1)	Report	A Marren (1-4), K Sweeney (0-3), N Murphy (0-1), S Gilmartin (0-1)	Newcastlewest GAA Field, Newcastlewest; Referee: C Lane

01/02/15; Round 1	Armagh	2-08 – 0-13	Tipperary	Athletic Grounds, Armagh; Referee: D Coldrick
01/02/15; Round 1	J Clarke (1-5), M Shields (1-0), A Forker (0-1), M McKenna (0-1), T Kernan (0-1)		C Sweeney (0-4), C O'Riordan (0-3), B Grogan (0-2), S O'Brien (0-2), G Hannigan (0-1), M Quinlivan (0-1)	Athletic Grounds, Armagh; Referee: D Coldrick

08/02/15; Round 2	Tipperary	1-14 – 1-02	Limerick	Semple Stadium, Thurles; Referee: E O'Grady
08/02/15; Round 2	C Sweeney (0-5), I Fahy (1-0), B Fox (0-2), P Acheson (0-2), S O'Brien (0-2), A Campbell (0-1), E Comer (0-1), M Quinlivan (0-1)		S Buckley (1-0), I Corbett (0-1), P Nash (0-1)	Semple Stadium, Thurles; Referee: E O'Grady

08/02/15; Round 2	Wexford	1-08 – 2-13	Armagh	Wexford Park, Wexford; Referee: C Lane
08/02/15; Round 2	K O'Grady (1-2), A Flynn (0-2), B Brosnan (0-2), K O'Connor (0-2)		S Campbell (0-7), E Rafferty (1-3), C O'Hanlon (1-0), A Forker (0-1), C Vernon (0-1), G McParland (0-1)	Wexford Park, Wexford; Referee: C Lane

08/02/15; Round 2	Sligo	0-12 – 0-14	Fermanagh	Markievicz Park, Sligo; Referee: D Fahy
08/02/15; Round 2	A Marren (0-3), M Breheny (0-3), P Hughes (0-2), D Kelly (0-1), K Cawley (0-1), K Sweeney (0-1), N Murphy (0-1)		S Quigley (0-7), B Mulrone (0-2), C Jones (0-2), R Jones (0-2), R Corrigan (0-1)	Markievicz Park, Sligo; Referee: D Fahy

08/02/15; Round 2	Louth	1-16 – 0-13	Clare	Drogheda Park, Drogheda; Referee: M McNally
08/02/15; Round 2	R Burns (0-5), A Reid (1-1), C Grimes (0-3), C Judge (0-3), D Byrne (0-2), D Maguire (0-1), S O'Hanlon (0-1)		D Tubridy (0-6), S McGrath (0-4), S Hickey (0-3)	Drogheda Park, Drogheda; Referee: M McNally

01/03/15; Round 3	Limerick	1-06 – 2-16	Armagh	Gaelic Grounds, Limerick; Referee: J Hickey
01/03/15; Round 3	T Lee (1-0), D Neville (0-2), B Scanlon (0-1), C Fahy (0-1), G Noonan (0-1), S Buckley (0-1)		M McKenna (0-6), A Forker (1-1), M Shields (1-1), T Kernan (0-3), C O'Hanlon (0-2), C Rafferty (0-1), E Rafferty (0-1), F Moriarty (0-1)	Gaelic Grounds, Limerick; Referee: J Hickey

01/03/15; Round 3	Louth	1-16 – 1-10	Wexford	Drogheda Park, Drogheda; Referee: N Cullen
01/03/15; Round 3	C Judge (0-6), R Burns (0-3), T Durnin (1-0), D O'Hanlon (0-2), A Williams (0-1), C Grimes (0-1), D Maguire (0-1), R Moore (0-1), S O'Hanlon (0-1)		B Brosnan (0-4), C Sinnott (1-0), K Rowe (0-2), C Kehoe (0-1), G Cullen (0-1), K O'Grady (0-1), M Furlong (0-1)	Drogheda Park, Drogheda; Referee: N Cullen

01/03/15; Round 3	Fermanagh	2-09 – 0-11	Tipperary	Brewster Park, Enniskillen; Referee: N Mooney
01/03/15; Round 3	S Quigley (1-5), P McCusker (1-0), R Jones (0-2), M O'Brien (0-1), T Corrigan (0-1)		C Sweeney (0-5), B Grogan (0-1), E Comer (0-1), G Hannigan (0-1), M Quinlivan (0-1), P Austin (0-1), S O'Brien (0-1)	Brewster Park, Enniskillen; Referee: N Mooney

01/03/15; Round 3	Clare	0-22 – 1-13	Sligo	Cusack Park, Ennis; Referee: J Henry
01/03/15; Round 3	P Burke (0-5), S McGrath (0-5), G Brennan (0-3), S Hickey (0-3), D Tubridy (0-2), S Collins (0-2), C O'Connor (0-1), D Ryan (0-1)		A Marren (1-6), D Kelly (0-3), M Breheny (0-2), C Davey (0-1), N Ewing (0-1)	Cusack Park, Ennis; Referee: J Henry

07/03/15; Round 4	Tipperary	2-11 – 1-08	Clare	Semple Stadium, Thurles; Referee: G McCormack
07/03/15; Round 4	C Sweeney (1-2), P Austin (1-2), B Grogan (0-2), S O'Brien (0-2), I Fahey (0-1), M Quinlivan (0-1), S Kennedy (0-1)		D Tubridy (0-4), S McGrath (0-4), S Brennan (1-0)	Semple Stadium, Thurles; Referee: G McCormack

07/03/15; Round 4	Armagh	1-10 – 1-10	Fermanagh	Athletic Grounds, Armagh; Referee: B Cassidy
07/03/15; Round 4	E Rafferty (0-5), M McKenna (1-1), M Murray (0-2), A Forker (0-1), E McVerry (0-1)		S Quigley (0-6), R Corrigan (1-0), R Jones (0-2), E Donnelly (0-1), T Corrigan (0-1)	Athletic Grounds, Armagh; Referee: B Cassidy

08/03/15; Round 4	Sligo	2-26 – 2-09	Louth	Markievicz Park, Sligo; Referee: L Devenney
08/03/15; Round 4	M Breheny (0-8), D Kelly (1-5), A Marren (0-7), P Hughes (0-3), C Davey (1-0), N Murphy (0-2), N Ewing (0-1)		D Crilly (1-2), C Grimes (1-0), C Judge (0-2), D Byrne (0-2), R Burns (0-2), J Connolly (0-1)	Markievicz Park, Sligo; Referee: L Devenney

08/03/15; Round 4	Wexford	1-16 – 2-12	Limerick	Wexford Park, Wexford; Referee: M Collins
08/03/15; Round 4	B Brosnan (0-8), K O'Grady (1-2), K Butler (0-2), B Malone (0-1), C Kehoe (0-1), C Lyng (0-1), P Byrne (0-1)		K Phair (0-5), D Tracey (1-0), P Nash (1-0), D Neville (0-1), G Hegarty (0-1), I Corbett (0-1), J Lee (0-1), K Ryan (0-1), R Browne (0-1), S Buckley (0-1)	Wexford Park, Wexford; Referee: M Collins

15/03/15; Round 5	Louth	3-11 – 4-16	Tipperary	Drogheda Park, Drogheda; Referee: B Rice
15/03/15; Round 5	D Crilly (3-1), D Byrne (0-3), A Reid (0-2), R Burns (0-2), B Duffy (0-1), C Judge (0-1), E O'Connor (0-1)		C Sweeney (1-5), L Casey (1-1), P Austin (1-1), B Grogan (0-3), G Hannigan (1-0), C O'Riordan (0-2), S O'Brien (0-2), B Mulvihill (0-1), R Kiely (0-1)	Drogheda Park, Drogheda; Referee: B Rice

15/03/15; Round 5	Fermanagh	2-19 – 2-10	Limerick	Brewster Park, Enniskillen; Referee: E O'Grady
15/03/15; Round 5	S Quigley (0-11), R Corrigan (1-1), C Jones (0-3), E Donnelly (1-0), D McCusker (0-2), A Breen (0-1), T Corrigan (0-1)		S Buckley (0-3), D Ward (1-0), R Browne (1-0), P Nash (0-2), D Tracey (0-1), I Corbett (0-1), J McCarthy (0-1), J Riordan (0-1), K Phair (0-1)	Brewster Park, Enniskillen; Referee: E O'Grady

15/03/15; Round 5	Clare	1-11 – 3-11	Armagh	Cusack Park, Ennis; Referee: M Collins
15/03/15; Round 5	J Malone (0-3), P Burke (1-0), C O'Connor (0-2), G Brennan (0-2), S Brennan (0-1), S Collins (0-1), S McGrath (0-1), C McInerney (0-1)	Report	T Kernan (2-2), E Rafferty (1-1), A Forker (0-2), A Mallon (0-1), A Murnin (0-1), C Rafferty (0-1), E McVerry (0-1), M McKenna (0-1), S Harold (0-1)	Cusack Park, Ennis; Referee: M Collins

15/03/15; Round 5	Sligo	2-10 – 1-08	Wexford	Markievicz Park, Sligo; Referee: J Molloy
15/03/15; Round 5	A Marren (1-3), M Breheny (1-3), N Murphy (0-3), C Davey (0-1)		C Lyng (0-4), T Rossiter (1-0), B Brosnan (0-2), J Carty (0-1), J Tubritt (0-1)	Markievicz Park, Sligo; Referee: J Molloy

28/03/15; Round 6	Armagh	0-10 – 0-08	Louth	Athletic Grounds, Armagh; Referee: C Branagan
28/03/15; Round 6	C O'Hanlon (0-4), J Clarke (0-2), A Forker (0-1), E Rafferty (0-1), G McParland (0-1), T Kernan (0-1)		R Burns (0-6), D Byrne (0-1), D Maguire (0-1)	Athletic Grounds, Armagh; Referee: C Branagan

29/03/15; Round 6	Wexford	0-07 – 1-12	Fermanagh	Wexford Park, Wexford; Referee: D Fahy
29/03/15; Round 6	C Lyng (0-2), B Brosnan (0-1), E Nolan (0-1), J Tubritt (0-1), K O'Grady (0-1), T Rossiter (0-1)		S Quigley (1-4), B Mulrone (0-2), R Jones (0-2), T Corrigan (0-2), C Flaherty (0-1), E Donnelly (0-1)	Wexford Park, Wexford; Referee: D Fahy

29/03/15; Round 6	Limerick	2-10 – 1-05	Clare	Newcastlewest GAA Field, Newcastlewest; Referee: S Joy
29/03/15; Round 6	S Buckley (1-2), P Nash (1-1), D Neville (0-2), C Sheehan (0-1), D Treacy (0-1), I Ryan (0-1), K Moore (0-1), R Browne (0-1)		G Brennan (0-3), P Burke (1-0), C O'Connor (0-1), D Ryan (0-1)	Newcastlewest GAA Field, Newcastlewest; Referee: S Joy

29/03/15; Round 6	Tipperary	0-15 – 0-13	Sligo	Semple Stadium, Thurles; Referee: J Hickey
29/03/15; Round 6	C Sweeney (0-5), P Austin (0-3), J Lonergan (0-2), B Grogan (0-1), B Mulvihill (0-1), C O'Riordan (0-1), I Fahey (0-1), R Kiely (0-1)		M Breheny (0-7), D Kelly (0-2), A Devaney (0-1), A Marren (0-1), N Murphy (0-1), S Gilmartin (0-1)	Semple Stadium, Thurles; Referee: J Hickey

05/04/15; Round 7	Sligo	1-19 – 1-08	Armagh	Markievicz Park, Sligo; Referee: D Fahy
05/04/15; Round 7	A Marren (0-8), M Breheny (0-5), D Kelly (1-1), C Breheny (0-1), K Cawley (0-1), N Ewing (0-1), N Murphy (0-1), P Hughes (0-1)		E McVerry (0-4), A Murnin (1-1), G Parland (0-2), S Harold (0-1)	Markievicz Park, Sligo; Referee: D Fahy

05/04/15; Round 7	Louth	2-11 – 2-13	Limerick	Drogheda Park, Drogheda; Referee: M McNally
05/04/15; Round 7	R Burns (1-4), C Judge (0-3), C Grimes (1-0), D Crilly (0-2), D Maguire (0-1), E O'Connor (0-1)		I Ryan (0-8), P Nash (1-1), P Ranahan (1-0), D Neville (0-1), G Hegarty (0-1), I Corbett (0-1), R Browne (0-1)	Drogheda Park, Drogheda; Referee: M McNally

05/04/15; Round 7	Clare	1-14 – 2-08	Fermanagh	Cusack Park, Ennis; Referee: M Duffy
05/04/15; Round 7	P Burke (1-3), G Brennan (0-5), S McGrath (0-4), J Malone (0-1), P Collins (0-1)		S Quigley (2-2), D Kille (0-2), D McQuade (0-2), A Breen (0-1), B Mulrone (0-1), C Jones (0-1)	Cusack Park, Ennis; Referee: M Duffy

05/04/15; Round 7	Tipperary	2-12 – 2-15	Wexford	Clonmel GAA Ground, Clonmel; Referee: D Gough
05/04/15; Round 7	G Mulhaire (0-5), P Acheson (1-1), C Sweeney (0-3), G Hannigan (1-0), B Mulvihill (0-1), D Lonergan (0-1), S Flynn (0-1)		C Lyng (1-5), K O'Grady (1-1), B Brosnan (0-2), E Nolan (0-2), T Rossiter (0-2), J Rossiter (0-1), J White (0-1), K Butler (0-1)	Clonmel GAA Ground, Clonmel; Referee: D Gough

=== Division 3 Final ===
25/04/15	Armagh	0-16 – 0-11	Fermanagh	Croke Park, Dublin; Referee: D O'Mahoney
25/04/15	T Kernan(0-6, 5f), E Rafferty (0-3, 3f), J Clarke (0-2), S Harold (0-2), K Dyas (0-1), C O'Hanlon (0-1), A Forker (0-1),	Report	S Quigley (0-7, 6f, 45), T Corrigan (0-3), R Corrigan (0-1)	Croke Park, Dublin; Referee: D O'Mahoney

== Division 4 ==
=== Table ===
Compete in Division 4 final and automatic promotion to Division 3

Team	Pld	W	D	L	F	A	Diff	Pts
Longford	7	6	1	0	5-103	3-76	33	13
Offaly	7	5	1	1	5-89	7-58	25	11
Antrim	7	4	1	2	5-87	3-87	6	9
Leitrim	7	3	2	2	4-99	4-79	20	8
Carlow	7	2	2	3	4-72	3-87	-12	6
Waterford	7	1	1	5	4-75	6-82	-13	3
Wicklow	7	1	1	5	3-70	6-85	-24	3
London	7	1	1	5	9-52	7-93	-35	3

^{1}Waterford, Wicklow and London are ranked by points difference.

=== Rounds 1 to 7 ===
31/01/15; Round 1	Waterford	0-14 – 0-10	Wicklow	Fraher Field, Dungarvan; Referee: M Collins
31/01/15; Round 1	M O'Halloran (0-4), S Ahearne (0-4), P Hurney (0-2), G Nugent (0-1), L Lawlor (0-1), M Ferncombe (0-1), T O hUallachain (0-1)		D Odlum (0-4), J McGrath (0-3), C McGraynor (0-2), T Kelly (0-1)	Fraher Field, Dungarvan; Referee: M Collins

01/02/15; Round 1	London	1-02 – 0-09	Offaly	Emerald GAA Grounds, Ruislip; Referee: G McCormack
01/02/15; Round 1	L Mulvey (1-0), A O'Hara (0-2)		B Allen (0-3), D Hogan (0-1), G Guilfoyle (0-1), N Dunne (0-1), P Sullivan (0-1), R Allen (0-1), W Mulhall (0-1)	Emerald GAA Grounds, Ruislip; Referee: G McCormack

01/02/15; Round 1	Leitrim	0-15 – 1-12	Longford	Páirc Seán Mac Diarmada, Carrick-on-Shannon; Referee: L Devenny
01/02/15; Round 1	D Wrynn (0-4), F Clancy (0-3), K Conlon (0-3), C Gilheaney (0-2), P McGowan (0-2), S McWeeney (0-1)		S McCormack (1-3), B Kavanagh (0-5), A Rowan (0-1), F McGee (0-1), M Quinn (0-1), P McKeon (0-1)	Páirc Seán Mac Diarmada, Carrick-on-Shannon; Referee: L Devenny

01/02/15; Round 1	Antrim	1-12 – 0-15	Carlow	Páirc Naomh Pol, Belfast; Referee: B Rice
01/02/15; Round 1	O Gallagher (1-3), M Pollock (0-4), C Murray (0-1), CJ McGourty (0-1), P McBride (0-1), R Murray (0-1), T McCann (0-1)		P Broderick (0-7), J Murphy (0-3), B Murphy (0-2), A Kelly (0-1), D Foley (0-1), E Finnegan (0-1)	Páirc Naomh Pol, Belfast; Referee: B Rice

08/02/15; Round 2	Carlow	2-09 – 0-13	London	Dr. Cullen Park, Carlow; Referee: B Cawley
08/02/15; Round 2	D O'Brien (1-1), H Gahan (1-1), D Foley (0-2), A Kelly (0-1), C Moran (0-1), D St Ledger (0-1), E Finnegan (0-1), J Kennedy (0-1)		C Sheridan (0-3), L Mulvey (0-3), S Conroy (0-3), A Moyles (0-2), A O'Hara (0-2)	Dr. Cullen Park, Carlow; Referee: B Cawley

08/02/15; Round 2	Wicklow	0-11 – 0-10	Leitrim	Aughrim County Ground, Aughrim; Referee: N Ward
08/02/15; Round 2	J McGrath (0-4), C McGraynor (0-2), S Furlong (0-2), B McCrea (0-1), D Hayden (0-1), M Kenny (0-1)		K Conlon (0-6), D Wrynn (0-1), F Clancy (0-1), J McGrail (0-1), M McWeeney (0-1)	Aughrim County Ground, Aughrim; Referee: N Ward

08/02/15; Round 2	Longford	0-14 – 0-13	Antrim	Pearse Park, Longford; Referee: S Hehir
08/02/15; Round 2	B Kavanagh (0-4), P McKeon (0-3), B McKeon (0-2), F McGee (0-2), B Gilleran (0-1), R McEntire (0-1), S McCormack (0-1)		CJ McGourty (0-5), M Pollock (0-3), R Murray (0-3), C Murray (0-1), D Lynch (0-1)	Pearse Park, Longford; Referee: S Hehir

08/02/15; Round 2	Offaly	0-13 – 1-04	Waterford	O'Connor Park, Tullamore; Referee: S Joy
08/02/15; Round 2	N Dunne (0-3), D Hogan (0-2), N McNamee (0-2), W Mulhall (0-2), B Allen (0-1), G Guilfoyle (0-1), J O'Connor (0-1), R Allen (0-1)		M Curry (1-0), M O'Halloran (0-1), P Hurney (0-1), P Whyte (0-1), S Aherne (0-1)	O'Connor Park, Tullamore; Referee: S Joy

28/02/15; Round 3	London	0-06 – 1-18	Longford	Emerald GAA Grounds, Ruislip; Referee: J Molloy
28/02/15; Round 3	A O'Hara (0-3), L Mulvey (0-1), S Buckley (0-1), S Conroy (0-1)		P McKeon (1-3), F McGee (0-4), C Smyth (0-2), S McCormack (0-2), B McKeon (0-1), C Quaine (0-1), D Masterson (0-1), E Williams (0-1), K Diffley (0-1), P Gill (0-1), R McEntire (0-1)	Emerald GAA Grounds, Ruislip; Referee: J Molloy

28/02/15; Round 3	Waterford	0-09 – 0-11	Carlow	Fraher Field, Dungarvan; Referee: D O'Mahoney
28/02/15; Round 3	S Ahearne (0-6), M Ferncombe (0-1), M O'Halloran (0-1), P Hurney (0-1)		Brian Murphy (0-4), S Gannon (0-3), C Moran (0-1), D O'Brien (0-1), D St Ledger (0-1), J Murphy (0-1)	Fraher Field, Dungarvan; Referee: D O'Mahoney

01/03/15; Round 3	Wicklow	2-06 – 2-18	Offaly	Aughrim County Ground, Aughrim; Referee: D Maher
01/03/15; Round 3	C McGraynor (2-3), B McCrea (0-1), M Kenny (0-1), S Furlong (0-1)		W Mulhall (2-4), N McNamee (0-5), B Allen (0-4), B Darby (0-1), C Donohue (0-1), J Moloney (0-1), N Darby (0-1), N Dunne (0-1)	Aughrim County Ground, Aughrim; Referee: D Maher

01/03/15; Round 3	Leitrim	1-13 – 1-18	Antrim	Páirc Seán Mac Diarmada, Carrick-on-Shannon; Referee: N McKenna
01/03/15; Round 3	K Conlan (0-5), A McLoughlin (1-2), R Kennedy (0-3), D Sweeney (0-2), P McGowan (0-1)		CJ McGourty (0-8), M Pollock (1-1), C Murray (0-2), R Murray (0-2), J Crozier (0-1), J Laverty (0-1), O Gallagher (0-1), P McBride (0-1), T McCann (0-1)	Páirc Seán Mac Diarmada, Carrick-on-Shannon; Referee: N McKenna

08/03/15; Round 4	Offaly	2-13 – 1-16	Leitrim	O'Connor Park, Tullamore; Referee: N Cullen
08/03/15; Round 4	W Mulhall (1-6), N Dunne (1-2), N Darby (0-2), N McNamee (0-2), B Allen (0-1)		K Conlon (1-5), R Kennedy (0-5), A McLoughlin (0-2), F Clancy (0-2), D Sweeney (0-1), S Moran (0-1)	O'Connor Park, Tullamore; Referee: N Cullen

08/03/15; Round 4	Antrim	1-12 – 1-08	London	Páirc Mac Uilin, Ballycastle; Referee: T Carroll
08/03/15; Round 4	C McGourty (1-5), M Pollock (0-3), T McCann (0-2), M McCann (0-1), O Gallagher (0-1)		A O'Hara (1-2), L Mulvey (0-3), S Conroy (0-2), T Gaughan (0-1)	Páirc Mac Uilin, Ballycastle; Referee: T Carroll

08/03/15; Round 4	Longford	1-12 – 1-10	Waterford	Pearse Park, Longford; Referee: S Hehir
08/03/15; Round 4	F McGee (1-4), S McCormack (0-3), B McKeon (0-2), K Diffley (0-1), P McKeon (0-1), S Doyle (0-1)		M Ferncombe (1-3), P Hurney (0-3), P Whyte (0-2), J Veale (0-1), S Ahearne (0-1)	Pearse Park, Longford; Referee: S Hehir

08/03/15; Round 4	Carlow	0-09 – 0-09	Wicklow	Dr. Cullen Park, Carlow; Referee: F Barry
08/03/15; Round 4	Brian Murphy (0-3), D Foley (0-3), S Gannon (0-2), E Ruth (0-1)		D Odlum (0-4), C McGraynor (0-2), A McLoughlin (0-1), J McGrath (0-1), P McLoughlin (0-1)	Dr. Cullen Park, Carlow; Referee: F Barry

15/03/15; Round 5	Wicklow	1-10 – 1-16	Longford	Aughrim County Ground, Aughrim; Referee: F Barry
15/03/15; Round 5	S Furlong (0-5), C McGraynor (1-2), M Kenny (0-2), D Hayden (0-1)		F McGee (0-5), S McCormack (0-3), R McEntire (1-0), B Kavanagh (0-2), P McKeon (0-2), B Gilleran (0-1), E Williams (0-1), M Quinn (0-1), S Doyle (0-1)	Aughrim County Ground, Aughrim; Referee: F Barry

15/03/15; Round 5	Offaly	0-14 – 1-10	Carlow	O'Connor Park, Tullamore; Referee: D Maher
15/03/15; Round 5	B Allen (0-6), N McNamee (0-2), W Mulhall (0-2), B Darby (0-1), E Carroll (0-1), J Evans (0-1), J Moloney (0-1)		D O'Brien (1-2), Brendan Murphy (0-2), C Moran (0-1), C Mullins (0-1), D St Ledger (0-1), E Finnegan (0-1), J Murphy (0-1), S Gannon (0-1)	O'Connor Park, Tullamore; Referee: D Maher

15/03/15; Round 5	Waterford	0-13 – 0-15	Antrim	Walsh Park, Waterford; Referee: N Ward
15/03/15; Round 5	P Whyte (0-8), P Hurney (0-3), JJ Hutchinson (0-1), S Briggs (0-1)		CJ McGourty (0-9), M Pollock (0-4), C Murray (0-1), P McAleer (0-1)	Walsh Park, Waterford; Referee: N Ward

22/03/15; Round 5	Leitrim	1-18 – 0-09	London	Páirc Seán Mac Diarmada, Carrick-on-Shannon; Referee: N McKenna
22/03/15; Round 5	K Conlon (0-9), F Clancy (0-3), R Kennedy (0-3), T Mulvey (1-0), D Sweeney (0-1), D Wrynn (0-1), R Flynn (0-1)		A O'Hara (0-3), L Mulvey (0-2), S Conroy (0-2), A Moyles (0-1), M Gottsche (0-1)	Páirc Seán Mac Diarmada, Carrick-on-Shannon; Referee: N McKenna

29/03/15; Round 6	London	5-06 – 2-15	Waterford	Emerald GAA Grounds, Ruislip; Referee: N Mooney
29/03/15; Round 6	L Mulvey (3-0), A O'Hara (1-4), P McGoldrick (1-0), B Smith (0-1), M Gottsche (0-1)		P Hurney (1-8), J Veale (1-2), M Ferncombe (0-3), JJ Hutchinson (0-1), M O'Halloran (0-1)	Emerald GAA Grounds, Ruislip; Referee: N Mooney

29/03/15; Round 6	Longford	0-13 – 0-10	Offaly	Pearse Park, Longford; Referee: B Crawley
29/03/15; Round 6	P McKeon (0-4), B Kavanagh (0-3), R McNerney (0-2), S McCormack (0-2), F Battrim (0-1), F McGee (0-1)		B Allen (0-5), N McNamee (0-3), E Carroll (0-1), J Maloney (0-1)	Pearse Park, Longford; Referee: B Crawley

29/03/15; Round 6	Carlow	0-06 – 1-12	Leitrim	Dr. Cullen Park, Carlow; Referee: N Ward
29/03/15; Round 6	A Kelly (0-1), Brendan Murphy (0-1), Brian Murphy (0-1), C Moran (0-1), S Gannon (0-1), S Redmond (0-1)		K Conlan (0-7), R Kennedy (0-4), F Clancy (1-0), J McGrail (0-1)	Dr. Cullen Park, Carlow; Referee: N Ward

29/03/15; Round 6	Antrim	1-10 – 0-12	Wicklow	Páirc Naomh Pol, Belfast; Referee: N Cullen
29/03/15; Round 6	CJ McGourty (1-6), M Pollock (0-3), C Murray (0-1)		J McGrath (0-5), D Odlum (0-3), D Hayden (0-1), M Kenny (0-1), S Kelly (0-1), T Kelly (0-1)	Páirc Naomh Pol, Belfast; Referee: N Cullen

05/04/15; Round 7	Wicklow	0-12 – 2-08	London	Aughrim County Ground, Aughrim; Referee: G McCormack
05/04/15; Round 7	J McGrath (0-6), P Cronin (0-2), A McLoughlin (0-1), D Healy (0-1), M Mangan (0-1), T Kelly (0-1)		A O'Hara (1-3), M Carroll (1-0), S Conroy (0-2), L Mulvey (0-1), M Gottsche (0-1), P McGoldrick (0-1)	Aughrim County Ground, Aughrim; Referee: G McCormack

05/04/15; Round 7	Leitrim	0-15 – 0-10	Waterford	Páirc Seán Mac Diarmada, Carrick-on-Shannon; Referee: N Cullen
05/04/15; Round 7	K Conlan (0-5), A McLoughlin (0-2), S Moran (0-2), G Reynolds (0-1), J McGrail (0-1), N Woods (0-1), P McGowan (0-1), R Kennedy (0-1), S McWeeney (0-1)		JJ Hutchinson (0-8), L O'Corraoin (0-1), M Ferncombe (0-1)	Páirc Seán Mac Diarmada, Carrick-on-Shannon; Referee: N Cullen

05/04/15; Round 7	Carlow	1-12 – 1-18	Longford	Dr. Cullen Park, Carlow; Referee: J Bermingham
05/04/15; Round 7	J Murphy (1-1), S Gannon (0-3), B Murphy (0-2), E McCormack (0-2), A Kelly (0-1), C Moran (0-1), D O'Brien (0-1), D St Ledger (0-1)		B Kavanagh (0-6), R McNerney (0-5), D Reynolds (1-0), M Quinn (0-2), P Gill (0-2), B Gilleran (0-1), L Connerton (0-1), S Doyle (0-1)	Dr. Cullen Park, Carlow; Referee: J Bermingham

05/04/15; Round 7	Offaly	1-12 – 1-07	Antrim	O'Connor Park, Tullamore; Referee: L Devenney
05/04/15; Round 7	B Allen (0-6), N Dunne (1-1), G Guilfoyle (0-3), W Mulhall (0-3)		CJ McGourty (1-4), M Pollock (0-2), J Crozier (0-1)	O'Connor Park, Tullamore; Referee: L Devenney

=== Division 4 Final ===
25/04/15	Longford	1-12 – 4-16	Offaly	Croke Park, Dublin; Referee: N Cullen
25/04/15	Brian Kavanagh 0-6 (0-5f), Shane Doyle 1-0, Diarmuid Masterson and Francis McGee 0-2 each, Michael Quinn and Ross McNerney (0-1f) 0-1 each	Report	William Mulhall 1-5 (0-2f), Nigel Dunne 1-3, Niall McNamee 0-4, Graham Guilfoyle, Paul McConway 1-0 each, Bernard Allen 0-2 (0-1f), Niall Smith and Anton Sullivan 0-1 each	Croke Park, Dublin; Referee: N Cullen

== Statistics ==
- All scores correct as of 16 April 2016

=== Scoring ===
- Widest winning margin: 17
  - Sligo 2-26 – 2-09 Louth (Division 3)
- Most goals in a match: 7
  - Louth 3-11 – 4-16 Tipperary (Division 3)
  - London 5-06 – 2-15 Waterford (Division 4)
- Most points in a match: 36
  - Kildare 2-12 – 0-24 Roscommon (Division 2)
- Most goals by one team in a match: 5
  - London 5-06 – 2-15 Waterford (Division 4)
- Highest aggregate score: 48 points
  - Louth 3-11 – 4-16 Tipperary (Division 3)
- Lowest aggregate score: 12 points
  - Dublin 0-08 – 0-04 Derry (Division 1)

=== Top scorers ===
Overall

Rank	Player	County	Tally	Total	Matches	Average
1	Seán Quigley	Fermanagh	4-49	61	8	7.6
2	Colm O'Neill	Cork	5-40	55	9	6.1
2	Dean Rock	Dublin	1-52	55	9	6.1
4	Donal O'Hare	Down	4-29	41	8	5.1
4	Adrian Marren	Sligo	3-32	41	7	5.9
6	CJ McGourty	Antrim	2-33	39	6	6.5
7	Michael Murphy	Donegal	2-32	38	7	5.4
8	Willie Mulhall	Offaly	4-23	35	7	5
8	Conor Sweeney	Tipperary	2-29	35	7	5
10	Diarmuid Murtagh	Roscommon	2-28	34	8	4.2
10	Mickey Newman	Meath	1-31	34	7	4.9
12	Conor McManus	Monaghan	0-33	33	7	4.7
12	Donal Kingston	Laois	3-24	33	6	5.5
14	John Heslin	Westmeath	0-32	32	7	4.6

Single game

Rank	Player	County	Tally	Total	Opposition
1	Colm O'Neill	Cork	2-06	12	Monaghan
2	Seán Quigley	Fermanagh	0-11	11	Limerick
2	Patrick Hurney	Waterford	1-08	11	London
4	David Tubridy	Clare	0-10	10	Wexford
4	Dean Rock	Dublin	0-10	10	Cork
4	Willie Mulhall	Offaly	2-04	10	Wicklow
4	Derek Crilly	Louth	3-01	10	Tipperary
