= 2015 All-Ireland Senior Football Championship =

Championship details
- Dates: 3 May — 20 September 2015
- Teams: 33

All-Ireland Champions
- Winning team: Dublin (25th win)
- Captain: Stephen Cluxton
- Manager: Jim Gavin

All-Ireland Finalists
- Losing team: Kerry
- Captain: Kieran Donaghy
- Manager: Éamonn Fitzmaurice

Provincial Champions
- Munster: Kerry
- Leinster: Dublin
- Ulster: Monaghan
- Connacht: Mayo

Championship statistics
- No. matches played: 62
- Top Scorer: Cillian O'Connor (3–34)
- Player of the Year: Jack McCaffrey

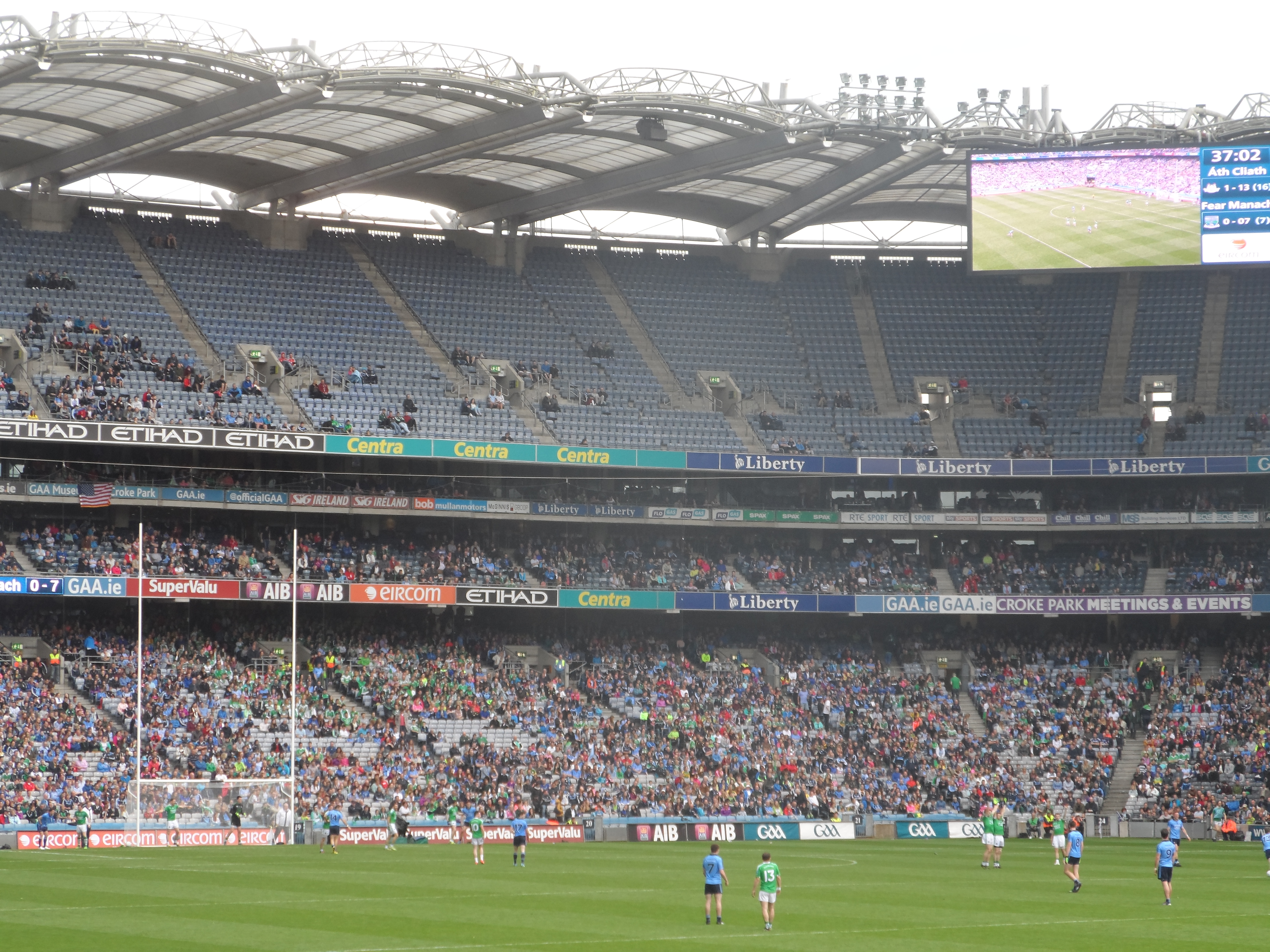
Dublin v. Fermanagh, All-Ireland quarter-final, Croke Park, 2 August 2015

The 2015 All-Ireland Senior Football Championship was the 129th edition of the GAA's premier inter-county Gaelic football since its establishment in 1887. 33 teams took part − 31 counties of Ireland (excluding Kilkenny), London and New York.

Dublin dethroned defending champions Kerry in the final, winning by 0–12 to 0–9.

== Teams ==
A total of 33 teams contested the championship – 31 teams from Ireland plus London and New York. As in previous years, Kilkenny footballers did not field a team. New York does not participate in the qualifiers.

== Format ==
Connacht, Leinster, Munster and Ulster organise four provincial championships on a knock-out basis. All the teams beaten in the provincial matches (except New York) enter the All-Ireland Qualifiers in rounds 1, 2 and 4. The qualifier matches are knock-out and eventually result in four teams who play in the All-Ireland Quarter-Finals against the four provincial winners. From the quarter-finals onwards the competition is entirely knock-out.

== Stadia and locations ==
Team	Location	Stadium	Stadium capacity
Antrim	Belfast	Casement Park	32,500
Armagh	Armagh	Athletic Grounds	19,500
Carlow	Carlow	Dr Cullen Park	21,000
Cavan	Cavan	Kingspan Breffni Park	32,000
Clare	Ennis	Cusack Park	14,864
Cork	Cork	Páirc Uí Chaoimh	43,550
Derry	Derry	Celtic Park	22,000
Donegal	Ballybofey	MacCumhaill Park	18,000
Down	Newry	Páirc Esler	20,000
Dublin	Dublin	Parnell Park	13,500
Fermanagh	Enniskillen	Brewster Park	20,000
Galway	Galway; Tuam	Pearse Stadium; St Jarlath's Park	26,197; 25,000
Kerry	Killarney	Fitzgerald Stadium	43,180
Kildare	Newbridge	St Conleth's Park	6,200
Laois	Portlaoise	O'Moore Park	27,000
Leitrim	Carrick-on-Shannon	Páirc Seán Mac Diarmada	9,331
Limerick	Limerick	Gaelic Grounds	49,866
London	Ruislip	Emerald GAA Grounds	5,000
Longford	Longford	Pearse Park	10,000
Louth	Drogheda	Drogheda Park	7,000
Mayo	Castlebar	MacHale Park	42,000
Meath	Navan	Páirc Tailteann	10,000
Monaghan	Clones	St Tiernach's Park	36,000
New York	Kingsbridge	Gaelic Park	2,000
Offaly	Tullamore	O'Connor Park	20,000
Roscommon	Roscommon	Dr Hyde Park	25,000
Sligo	Sligo	Markievicz Park	18,558
Tipperary	Thurles	Semple Stadium	53,500
Tyrone	Omagh	Healy Park	26,500
Waterford	Waterford	Walsh Park	17,000
Westmeath	Mullingar	Cusack Park	11,000
Wexford	Wexford	Wexford Park	20,000
Wicklow	Aughrim	Aughrim County Ground	10,000

== Fixtures and results ==
=== Connacht Senior Football Championship ===
Preliminary round
New York	0-08
Galway	2-18

Quarter-finals
London	0-10
Roscommon	1-14
Galway	1-13
Leitrim	0-08

Semi-finals
Roscommon	0-13
Sligo	1-14
Galway	2-08
Mayo	1-15

Final
Sligo	2-11
Mayo	6-25

19 July 2015
4.00 PM
Connacht Final

Sligo	2–11 – 6–25	Mayo
M Breheny (0–4), P Hughes, B Egan (1–0 each), A Marren (0–3), C Breheny, N Murphy, N Ewing, E McHugh (0–1 each)	Report	A O’Shea (3–4), C O’Connor (1–7), D O'Connor (0–4), L Keegan, S O’Shea (1–0 each), J Doherty (0–3), M Ronaldson, D Vaughan (0–2 each); P Durcan, B Moran and A Dillon (0–1 each).

Dr Hyde Park, Roscommon
Attendance: 23,149
Referee: P. O'Sullivan (Kerry)

=== Leinster Senior Football Championship ===
Preliminary round
Offaly	0-13
Longford	0-16
Laois	3-16
Carlow	0-08
Louth	0-16
Westmeath	3-14

Quarter-finals
Longford	0-10
Dublin	4-25
Laois	0-16 1-11
Kildare	0-16 3-18
Westmeath	1-21
Wexford	0-15
Wicklow	3-12
Meath	2-19

Semi-finals
Dublin	5-18
Kildare	0-14
Westmeath	3-19
Meath	2-18

Final
Dublin	2-13
Westmeath	0-06

12 July 2015
2.00 PM
Leinster Final

Dublin	2–13 – 0–06	Westmeath
B Brogan (1–1), J McCaffrey (1–0), D Connolly, C Kilkenny (0–3 each), D Rock (0–2), P McMahon, J McCarthy, MD Macauley, A Brogan (0–1 each)	Report	J Heslin (0–3), K Martin (0–2), F Boyle (0–1)

Croke Park, Dublin
Attendance: 48,000
Referee: Joe Mc Quillan (Cavan)

=== Munster Senior Football Championship ===
Quarter-finals
Clare	0–15
Limerick	0–13
Waterford	0–05
Tipperary	1–24

Semi-finals
Clare	1–08
Cork	1–20
Kerry	2–14
Tipperary	2–08

Final
Cork (R)	3–12; 1–6
Kerry (R)	2–15; 1–11

5 July 2015
2.00 PM
Munster Final

Kerry	2–15 – 3–12	Cork
J O’Donoghue (1–2), B Sheehan (0–4), BJ Keane (0–3), K Donaghy (1–0), J Buckley, D Walsh, C Cooper, P Geaney, A Maher, F Fitzgerald (0–1 each)	Report	C O’Neill (1–6), D O’Connor (1–3), Ba O’Driscoll (1–1), K O’Driscoll (0–2)

Fitzgerald Stadium, Killarney
Attendance: 35,651
Referee: P. Hughes (Armagh)
18 July 2015
7.00 PM
Final Replay

Kerry	1–11 – 1–06	Cork
P Geaney (1–3), B Sheehan (0–5), J O'Donoghue, D Walsh, J Lyne (0–1 each)	Report	P Kerrigan (1–0), C O'Neill (0–3), K O'Driscoll, D O'Connor, Br O'Driscoll (0–1 each)

Fitzgerald Stadium, Killarney
Attendance: 32,233
Referee: Maurice Deegan (Laois)

=== Ulster Senior Football Championship ===
Preliminary round
Donegal	1-13
Tyrone	1-10

Quarter-finals
Cavan	0-15
Monaghan	0-16
Fermanagh	1-13
Antrim	0-08
Derry	0-12
Down	0-11
Armagh	0-08
Donegal	2-11

Semi-finals
Monaghan	1-20
Fermanagh	0-13
Derry	0-10
Donegal	1-09

Final
Monaghan	0-11
Donegal	0-10

19 July 2015
2.00 PM
Ulster Final

Monaghan	0–11 – 0–10	Donegal
C McManus (0–6, 3 frees); K O'Connell, O Duffy, K Duffy, D Mone, O Lennon (0–1 each).	Report	P McBrearty (0–6, 4 frees); M Murphy (0–2, frees); K Lacey, F McGlynn (0–1 each).

St Tiernach's Park, Clones
Attendance: 31,977
Referee: David Coldrick (Meath)

== All-Ireland Series ==
=== Qualifiers ===
==== A and B teams ====
An A and B system for the qualifying draws was introduced in 2014 and continued in 2015. The teams were designated as A or B depending on which half of their provincial championships they were initially drawn to play in. Typically the provincial draws were not seeded, resulting in random A and B team designations.

In all qualifier rounds A teams played A teams and B teams played B teams. Usually the A teams completed their provincial games before the B teams, which allowed the A qualifier games to be scheduled a week before the B qualifier games.

==== Round 1 ====
The first round consisted of all teams that failed to reach their provincial semi-finals, with the exception of New York. 16 teams in total took part.

In round 1 four A teams played four A teams and four B teams played four B teams. The eight round 1 winners played the eight beaten provincial semi-finalists in round 2 of the qualifiers.

The following teams took part in this round:

Connacht (2)

London (A)

Leitrim (B)

Leinster (7)

Carlow (A)

Offaly (A)

Laois (A)

Longford (A)

Louth (B)

Wexford (B)

Wicklow (B)

Munster (2)

Waterford (A)

Limerick (B)

Ulster (5)

Antrim (A)

Cavan (A)

Armagh (B)

Down (B)

Tyrone (B)

20 June 2015
2.00 pm
Round 1A

London	0–11 – 2–22	Cavan
L Mulvey (0–6), A O'Hara (0–3), C Mackey, D McGreevy (0–1 each)	Report	G McKiernan (1–6), D McVeety (1–2), N McDermott (0–5), T Corr (0–3), N Murray, E Reilly, C Mackey, M McKeever, M Reilly, R Galligan (0–1 each)

Emerald GAA Grounds, Ruislip
Referee: Paddy Neilan (Roscommon)

20 June 2015
2.00 PM
Round 1A

Waterford	1–07 – 1–20	Offaly
J Veale (1–1), M Ferncombe (0–2), P Hurney, J Hutchinson, L Lawlor, T Prendergast (0–1 each)	Report	N Dunne (0–8), A Sullivan (1–1), G Guilfoyle (0–3), B Allen (0–2), P Cunningham, C McNamee, J Moloney, W Mulhall, J O'Connor (0–1 each)

Fraher Field, Dungarvan
Referee: Fergal Kelly (Longford)

20 June 2015
2.30 PM
Round 1A

Laois	1–16 – 2–15	Antrim
D Kingston (0–7), R Munnelly (0–4), P Kingston (1–0), D Strong (0–2), N Donoher, E O’Carroll, J O’Loughlin (0–1 each)	Report	R Murray (1–4), M Pollock (0–5), P McBride (0–2), O Gallagher, B Hasson, C Kerr, C Murray (0–1 each)

O'Moore Park, Portlaoise
Referee: Derek O'Mahoney (Tipperary)

20 June 2015
7.00 PM
Round 1A

Longford	2–15 – 1–08	Carlow
B Kavanagh (0–7), L Connerton (1–2), D Reynolds (1–1), D Masterson (0–2), F Battrim, R McEntire, M Quinn (0–1 each)	Report	D Roberts (1–0), B Murphy (0–3), D Bambrick, M Meaney, E Ruth, D St Ledger (0–1 each)

Pearse Park, Longford
Referee: David Gough (Meath)

27 June 2015
2.30 PM
Round 1B

Armagh	2–17 – 2–07	Wicklow
J Clarke (2–4), E Rafferty (0–4), M McKenna (0–3), A Murnin, C Rafferty (0–2 each), S Campbell, A Forker (0–1 each)	Report	P Cronin (0–4), J McGrath, J Stafford (1–0 each), D Hayden, C Hyland, C McGraynor (0–1 each)

Athletic Grounds, Armagh
Attendance: 6,083
Referee: Eddie Kinsella (Laois)

27 June 2015
6.30 PM
Round 1B

Wexford	2–16 – 2–11	Down
C Lyng (0–6), T Rossiter (1–1), N Rossiter (1–0), B Brosnan (0–3), M O’Regan (0–3), K Butler, G Molloy, K O’Grady (0–1 each)	Report	J Johnston (1–1), A McConville (1–0), D O’Hare (0–3), C Laverty, C Mooney, M Poland (0–2 each), P Devlin (0–1)

Wexford Park, Wexford
Referee: Marty Duffy (Sligo)

27 June 2015
7.00 PM
Round 1B

Louth	1–17 – 0–11	Leitrim
C Grimes (1–1), J Califf, R Holcroft, P Smith (0–3 each), R Burns (0–2), D Byrne, B Duffy, T Durnin, C Judge, D Maguire (0–1 each)	Report	K Conlan (0–5), F Clancy (0–4), D Beck, A McLoughlin (0–1 each)

Drogheda Park, Drogheda
Referee: Ciaran Branagan (Down)

28 June 2015
4.00 PM
Round 1B

Tyrone	1–14 – 0–08	Limerick
C McAliskey (0–6), P Harte (1–0), S Cavanagh (0–2), M Bradley, R Brennan, M Donnelly, T McCann, D McCurry, R O'Neill (0–1 each)	Report	I Ryan (0–2), R Browne, S Buckley, G Hegarty, K Moore, B Scanlon, C Sheehan (0–1 each)

Healy Park, Omagh
Attendance: 5,225
Referee: Paddy Neilan (Roscommon)

==== Round 2 ====
In the second round of the qualifiers the eight winning teams from Round 1A and Round 1B played the eight beaten provincial semi-finalists. The round 2 draw was unrestricted − if two teams had played each other in a provincial match they could be drawn to meet again. The eight winners of these matches played each other in Round 3.

Round 1A Winners (4)

Antrim

Cavan

Longford

Offaly

Provincial Semi-Finalists (A)

Clare

Kildare

Fermanagh

Roscommon

Round 1B Winners (4)

Armagh

Louth

Wexford

Tyrone

Provincial Semi-Finalists (B)

Derry

Galway

Tipperary

Meath

4 July
3.00 PM
Round 2A

Offaly	1–13 – 1–15	Kildare
W Mulhall 0–4(3f); P Cunningham 1–1; N Darby 0–2(fs); A Sullivan 0–2; C McNamee 0–1; B Allen 0–1; N Dunne 0–1; N McNamee 0–1	Report	E O’Flaherty 1–7(4f); A Smith 0–3; E Bolton 0–2; C McNally 0–1; E Callaghan 0–1; N Kelly 0–1

O'Connor Park, Tullamore
Referee: Conor Lane (Cork)

4 July
5.00 PM
Round 2A

Clare	1–12 – 2–12	Longford
D Tubridy 0–5 (4f), D Ryan 1–1, E Cleary 0–2 (1f), G Brennan 0–2 (1f), P Burke 0–1, Sean Collins 0–1	Report	B Kavanagh 1–5 (1–0 pen, 4f), D Reynolds 1–1, L Connerton 0–2, R Connor 0–2, M Quinn 0–1, D Masterson 0–1.

Cusack Park, Ennis
Referee: A. Nolan (Wicklow)

4 July
5.00 PM
Round 2A

Cavan	1–16 – 3–17	Roscommon
M Reilly 1–3, C Mackey 0–3 (1f), B Reilly 0–3 (2f), N Murray 0–2, N McDermott 0–1 (1f), G McKiernan 0–1, M Argue 0–1, T Hayes 0–1, M Dunne 0–1	Report	E Smith 2–1, C Cregg 1–1, D Shine 0–3 (2f), U Harney 0–3, C Murtagh 0–3 (1f), D Murtagh 0–3, C Daly 0–2, D Smith 0–1 (1 '45')

Breffni Park, Cavan
Referee: David Gough (Meath)

5 July
3.00 PM
Round 2A

Fermanagh	1–21 – 0–11	Antrim
S Quigley 0–14 (6f, 2 '45s'), M O'Brien 1–0, N Cassidy, P McCusker, T Corrigan, B Mulrone, C Jones, D Kille, S McManus 0–1 each	Report	CJ McGourty 0–3 (1f), M Pollock 0–3 (2f), N McKeever, M Sweeney, J Crozier, O Gallagher 0–1 each, C Kerr 0–1 (a '45')

Brewster Park, Enniskillen
Referee: Barry Cassidy (Derry)

11 July
2.00 PM
Round 2B

Derry	1–16 – 0–10	Wexford
M Lynch 0–6 (0-5f), C O'Boyle 0–3, B Heron 0–2 (0-1f), L McGoldrick 0–1, E Lynn 0–1, E Bradley 0–1 (0-1f), C McAtamney 0–1, D Heavron 0–1.	Report	A Flynn 0–1, B Malone 1–0 (OG), B Brosnan 0–3 (0-3f), C Lynch 0–5 (0-3f), E Nolan 0–1.

Owenbeg GAA, Dungiven
Referee: F. Kelly (Longford)

11 July
2.45 PM
Round 2B

Tipperary	3–21 – 0–07	Louth
K O’Halloran 0–7 (4f, 2 45s), C Sweeney 1–2 (1–0 pen, 0-1f), C O’Riordan 1–1, G Mulhair 1–0, P Acheson, M Quinlivan, P Austin 0–2 each, S Kennedy, L Casey, J Lonergan, B Fox, B Grogan (f) 0–1 each.	Report	D Byrne, R Burns (1f) 0–2 each, P Smith, R Holdcroft 0–1 each, C Judge 0–1 (1f).

Semple Stadium, Thurles
Referee: R. Hickey (Clare)

11 July
3.00 PM
Round 2B

Tyrone	1–10 – 0–11	Meath
R McNabb (0-01), P Harte (1-01, 1–0 pen), M Bradley (0-03, 1f), S Cavanagh (0-02), C McAliskey (0-01, f), D McCurry (0-01), T McCann (0-01)	Report	D Tobin (0-01), D Keogan (0-01), B Menton (0-01), G Reilly (0-03), M Newman (0-02, 2f), B McMahon (0-01)

Healy Park, Omagh
Attendance: 6,895
Referee: C. Branagan (Down)

12 July
3.00 PM
Round 2B

Armagh	0–12 – 1–12	Galway
J Morgan (0-01), E Rafferty (0-03, 2f), A Forker (0-02, 1f), M McKenna (0-02), A Murnin (0-01), J Clarke (0-01), M Shields (0-01), T Kernan (0-01)	Report	L Silke (0-01), G Sice (0-03, 2f), P Conroy (0-04, 4f), P Og O Griofa (0-01), D Comer (1-02), D Cummins (0-01)

Athletic Grounds, Armagh
Referee: David Gough (Meath)

==== Round 3 ====
In the third round of the qualifiers winning teams from round 2A played against winning teams from round 2A and winning teams from round 2B played against winning teams from round 2B. Round 3 rules did not allow two teams that had played each other in a provincial match to meet again. The four winners of these matches played the four beaten provincial finalists in Round 4.

Round 2A Winners (4)

Kildare

Longford

Roscommon

Fermanagh

Round 2B Winners (4)

Derry

Tipperary

Tyrone

Galway

11 July
7.00 PM
Round 3A

Longford	0–11 – 2–24	Kildare
R McEntire 0–1, D Reynolds 0–1, R Connor 0–1, B Kavanagh 0–7 (5fs), L Connerton 0–1	Report	M Donnellan 0–2(45s), O Lyons 0–1, E Bolton 0–1, P Cribbin 0–4, P O’Neill 0–2, E O’Flaherty 0–5(4fs), C McNally 0–1, N Kelly 0–2, A Smith 1–1, E Callaghan 1–1, M Sherry 0–1, M Conway 0–3(fs)

Cusack Park, Mullingar
Referee: D. O'Mahoney (Tipperary)

12 July
3.30 PM
Round 3A

Fermanagh	1–14 – 0–16	Roscommon
N Cassidy (0-02), B Mulrone (0-01); T Corrigan (0-05), S Quigley (1-03), R Jones (0-01), R Corrigan (0-01), D Kelly (0-01)	Report	D Shine (0-05), K Higgins (0-01), C Cregg (0-04), U Harney (0-03), C Murtagh (0-03)

Brewster Park, Enniskillen
Referee: C. Reilly (Meath)

18 July
3.00 PM
Round 3B

Tipperary	0–07 – 0–19	Tyrone
K O'Halloran 0–5, M Quinlivan 0–1, R Kiely 0–1	Report	D McCurry 0–5, C McAliskey 0–5, M Donnelly 0–3, S Cavanagh 0–3, P Harte 0–2, C McCann 0–1

Semple Stadium, Thurles
Attendance: 4,620
Referee: David Gough (Meath)

18 July
5.00 PM
Round 3B

Galway	1–11 – 0–08	Derry
G Sice 0–7, D Cummins 1–0, P Conroy 0–2, G Bradshaw 0–1, G O'Donnell 0–1	Report	D Heavron 0–3, B Heron 0–2, E Bradley 0–1, C O'Boyle 0–1, N Forrester 0–1.

Pearse Stadium, Salthill
Referee: Conor Lane (Cork)

==== Round 4 ====
In the fourth round of the qualifiers, the four winning teams of Round 3A and Round 3B played the four provincial beaten finalists. Round 4 rules did not allow two teams that had played each other in a provincial match to meet again if such a pairing could be avoided. The four winners of these matches played the provincial winners in the All-Ireland Quarter-Finals.

Round 3A Winners

Kildare

Fermanagh

Provincial Runners Up (A)

Westmeath

Cork

Round 3B Winners

Tyrone

Galway

Provincial Runners Up (B)

Sligo

Donegal

25 July
5.00 PM
Round 4A

Westmeath	0–07 – 1–13	Fermanagh
J. Connellan 0–4, Shane Dempsey 0–1, D. Glennon 0–1, R. Connellan 0–1	Report	T. Corrigan 1–7, S. Quigley 0–2, D. McCusker 0–1, N. Cassidy 0–1, D. McCusker 0–1, Damien Kelly 0–1

Breffni Park, Cavan
Referee: P. Hughes (Armagh)

25 July
7.00 PM
Round 4A

Cork	1–13 – 1–21	Kildare
C O’Neill 1–4; D O’Connor 0–5; Brian O’Driscoll, M Collins, P Kerrigan, B Hurley 0–1 each	Report	N Kelly 1–4; E O’Flaherty 0–5; P Fogarty 0–3; A Smith, P O’Neill, M Donnellan 0–2 each; O Lyons, P O’Neill, C McNally 0–1 each

Semple Stadium, Thurles
Referee: M. Duffy (Sligo)

1 August
4:00 PM
Round 4B

Sligo	0–14 – 0–21	Tyrone
M Breheny 0–6 (3f), P Hughes 0–3, A Marren 0–2 (2f), D Kelly 0–1, C Breheny 0–1, N Murphy 0–1	Report	D McCurry 0–8 (4f, 1 '45'), S Cavanagh 0–3, M Donnelly 0–3, M Bradley 0–2, C McAliskey 0–1, R Brennan 0–1, N Morgan 0–1 (1f), C Cavanagh 0–1, P Harte 0–1

Croke Park, Dublin
Referee: R. Hickey (Clare)

1 August
6:00 PM
Round 4B

Donegal	3–12 – 0–11	Galway
P McBrearty 1–1, C McFadden 0–4 (1f), R McHugh 1–0, C Toye 1–0, O MacNiallais 0–3, M Murphy 0–3 (2f), L McLoone 0–1	Report	G Sice 0–5 (5f), D Cummins 0–1, T Flynn 0–1, A Varley 0–1, P Conroy 0–1, S Walsh 0–1, D Comer 0–1 (1f)

Croke Park, Dublin
Referee: Eddie Kinsella (Laois)

=== All-Ireland knockout ===
(D) = Draw (R) = Replay

Quarter-finals
2 August 2015– Croke Park
Kerry	7-16
Kildare	0-10
8 August 2015– Croke Park
Monaghan	0–14
Tyrone	0–18
2 August 2015 – Croke Park
Dublin	2–23
Fermanagh	2–15
8 August 2015 – Croke Park
Mayo	2–13
Donegal	0–11

Semi-finals
23 August 2015 – Croke Park
Kerry	0-18
Tyrone	1-11
30 Aug (D) / 5 Sep 2015 (R)– Croke Park
Dublin 2–12 (D)	3–15 (R)
Mayo 1–15 (D)	1–14 (R)

Final
20 September 2015– Croke Park
Kerry	0-09
Dublin	0-12

==== Quarter-finals ====
The four provincial champions played the winners from Round 4 of the qualifiers. If one of the provincial champions had already met one of the qualifiers in an earlier match then those two teams could not be drawn together.

2 August
2.00 PM
Quarter-Final

Kerry	7–16 – 0–10	Kildare
C Cooper 2–3 (1f), D O'Sullivan 2–1, S O'Brien 1–4, BJ Keane 1–3, D Walsh 1–0, J O'Donoghue 0–3 (1f), P Geaney 0–2	Report	N Kelly 0–2, A Smith 0–2, P O'Neill 0–2, E Doyle 0–1, E O'Flaherty 0–1, O Lyons 0–1, F Dowling 0–1

Croke Park, Dublin
Referee: David Coldrick (Meath)

2 August
4.00 PM
Quarter-Final

Dublin	2–23 – 2–15	Fermanagh
B Brogan 1–6; D Rock 0–7 (2f, 1 ’45’), C Kilkenny 0–3; P Andrews 0–3, P Flynn 1–1, D Connolly 0–2, B Fenton 0–1	Report	S Quigley 1–8 (4f), T Corrigan 1–2 (1f), B Mulrone 0–3, C Jones 0–2

Croke Park, Dublin
Referee: P. O'Sullivan (Kerry)

8 August
4:00 PM
Quarter-Final

Monaghan	0–14 – 0–18	Tyrone
C McManus 0–7 (0-5f), O Duffy 0–2, D Hughes, D Mone, F Kelly, D Clerkin, P Finlay (0-1f) 0–1.	Report	D McCurry 0–6 (0-3f, 0–1 45), C McAliskey 0–5 (0-4f), M Donnelly 0–2, Joe McMahon, P Harte, S Cavanagh, R McNabb, R McNamee 0–1.

Croke Park, Dublin
Referee: Marty Duffy (Sligo)

8 August
6:00 PM
Quarter-Final

Mayo	2–13 – 0–11	Donegal
Lee Keegan 1–2, Aidan O'Shea 1–0, Jason Doherty 0–3, Cillian O'Connor 0–3 (0-2f), Kevin McLoughlin 0–2, Keith Higgins 0–1, A Freeman 0–1, A Moran 0–1.	Report	Michael Murphy 0–8 (0-5f), Christy Toye 0–1, Leo McLoone 0–1, Anthony Thompson 0–1.

Croke Park, Dublin
Referee: David Gough (Meath)

==== Semi-finals ====
There was no draw for the semi-finals as the fixtures were pre-determined on a three yearly rotation. This rotation ensured that a province's champions played the champions of all the other provinces once every three years in the semi-finals if they each won their quarter-finals. If a qualifier team defeated a provincial winner in a quarter-final, the qualifier team took that provincial winner's place in the semi-final.

23 August
3.30PM
Semi-Final

Kerry	0–18 – 1–11	Tyrone
James O'Donoghue 0–4 (0-3f, 1 '45), Johnny Buckley and Paul Geaney (0-1f) 0–3 each, Stephen O'Brien and Colm Cooper (0-1f) 0–2 each, Anthony Maher, Donnchadh Walsh, Kieran Donaghy, Barry John Keane 0–1 each	Report	Peter Harte 1–0 pen, Darren McCurry 0–3 (0-1f), Mark Bradley and Conor McAliskey 0–2 each, Niall Morgan (0-1f), Ronan McNabb, Colm Cavanagh, Mattie Donnelly 0–1 ech

Croke Park
Attendance: 53,044
Referee: Maurice Deegan (Laois)

30 August; 3.30PM; Semi-Final	Dublin	2–12 – 1–15	Mayo	Croke Park; Attendance: 82,300; Referee: Joe McQuillan (Cavan)
30 August; 3.30PM; Semi-Final	Diarmuid Connolly 1–2 (1–0 pen, 0-1f), Kevin McManamon 1–1, Ciaran Kilkenny 0–3, Paddy Andrews and Bernard Brogan 0–2 each, Jack McCaffrey and Alan Brogan 0–1 each	Report	Cillian O’Connor 1–9 (1–0 pen, 0-8f, 1 '45), Andy Moran 0–2, Keith Higgins, Lee Keegan, Diarmuid O’Connor, Alan Freeman 0–1 each	Croke Park; Attendance: 82,300; Referee: Joe McQuillan (Cavan)

5 September; 5.00PM; Semi-Final Replay	Dublin	3–15 – 1–14	Mayo	Croke Park; Attendance: 82,300; Referee: Eddie Kinsella (Laois)
5 September; 5.00PM; Semi-Final Replay	Philly McMahon 1–2, Paddy Andrews 0–5, Bernard Brogan and Kevin McManamon 1–1 each, Ciaran Kilkenny and Dean Rock (0-2f) 0–2 each, James McCarthy and Brian Fenton 0–1 each	Report	Cillian O'Connor 1–6 (0-5f), Diarmuid O'Connor 0–2, Lee Keegan, Barry Moran, Aidan O’Shea, Kevin McLoughlin, Patrick Durcan, Andy Moran (0-1f) 0–1 each	Croke Park; Attendance: 82,300; Referee: Eddie Kinsella (Laois)

==== Final ====
20 September; 3.30 p.m. Final	Kerry	0–9 – 0–12	Dublin	Croke Park, Dublin; Attendance: 82,300; Referee: David Coldrick (Meath); Man of the Match: Brian Fenton
20 September; 3.30 p.m. Final	J O'Donoghue 0–3, D O'Sullivan 0–2, P Geaney 0–2, J Lyne 0–1, B Sheehan 0–1 (1f).	Report	P Flynn 0–2, B Brogan 0–2 (1f), D Rock 0–2 (2f), B Fenton 0–1, S Cluxton 0–1 (1f), J McCaffrey 0–1, P Andrews 0–1, P McMahon 0–1, A Brogan 0–1	Croke Park, Dublin; Attendance: 82,300; Referee: David Coldrick (Meath); Man of the Match: Brian Fenton

== Referees' Panel 2015 ==
Province	Referee	County
Ulster	Ciaran Branagan	Down
Ulster	Barry Cassidy	Derry
Leinster	David Coldrick	Meath
Leinster	Maurice Deegan	Laois
Connacht	Marty Duffy	Sligo
Leinster	David Gough	Meath
Munster	Rory Hickey	Clare
Ulster	Pádraig Hughes	Armagh
Ulster	Seán Hurson	Tyrone
Leinster	Fergal Kelly	Longford
Leinster	Eddie Kinsella	Laois
Munster	Conor Lane	Cork
Connacht	Paddy Neilan	Roscommon
Leinster	Anthony Nolan	Wicklow
Leinster	Cormac Reilly	Meath
Ulster	Joe McQuillan	Cavan
Munster	Pádraig O'Sullivan	Kerry
Munster	Derek O'Mahoney	Tipperary

== Statistics ==
- All scores correct as of September 20, 2015

=== Scoring ===
- First goal of the championship:
  - Shane Walsh for Galway against New York (3 May 2015)
- Widest winning margin: 27 points
  - Dublin 4–25 – 0–10 Longford (Leinster quarter-final)
  - Kerry 7–16 – 0–10 Kildare (All-Ireland quarter-final)
- Most goals in a match: 8
  - Mayo 6–25 – 2–11 Sligo (Connacht final)
- Most points in a match: 38
  - Dublin 2-23 – 2-15 Fermanagh (All-Ireland quarter-final)
- Most goals by one team in a match: 7
  - Kerry 7–16 – 0–10 Kildare (All-Ireland quarter-final)
- Highest aggregate score: 60
  - Mayo 6–25 – 2–11 Sligo (Connacht final)
- Lowest aggregate score: 21
  - Monaghan 0–11 – 0–10 Donegal (Ulster final)
  - Dublin 0–12 – 0–9 Kerry (All-Ireland final)
- Most goals scored by a losing team: 3
  - Meath 2–19 – 3–12 Wicklow (Leinster quarter-final)

=== Top scorers ===
Overall

Rank	Player	County	Tally	Total	Matches	Average
1	Cillian O'Connor	Mayo	3–34	43	5	8.60
2	Seán Quigley	Fermanagh	2–36	42	6	7.50
3	Bernard Brogan	Dublin	6–21	39	7	5.57
4	Eoghan O'Flaherty	Kildare	2–31	37	7	5.29
5	Brian Kavanagh	Longford	1–29	32	5	6.40
6	John Heslin	Westmeath	1–26	29	4	7.25
6	Conor McManus	Monaghan	1–26	29	4	7.25
6	Dean Rock	Dublin	2–23	29	7	4.14
9	Donie Kingston	Laois	2–22	28	4	7.00
10	Darren McCurry	Tyrone	1–24	27	7	3.86
11	Tomás Corrigan	Fermanagh	2–18	24	6	4.00
11	Colm O'Neill	Cork	2–18	24	4	6.00
13	Connor McAliskey	Tyrone	0–23	23	7	3.29
13	Michael Murphy	Donegal	0–23	23	6	3.83
15	Diarmuid Connolly	Dublin	4–10	22	7	3.14
16	Gary Sice	Galway	1–18	21	6	3.50
17	Donncha O'Connor	Cork	2–14	20	4	5.00
18	Ciarán Lyng	Wexford	0–19	19	3	6.33

Single game

Rank	Player	County	Tally	Total	Opposition
1	Seán Quigley	Fermanagh	0–14	14	Antrim
2	Aidan O'Shea	Mayo	3-04	13	Sligo
3	Cillian O'Connor	Mayo	1-09	12	Dublin
3	Andrew Tormey	Meath	1-09	12	Wicklow
3	John Heslin	Westmeath	1-09	12	Meath
6	Seán Quigley	Fermanagh	1-08	11	Dublin
7	Tomás Corrigan	Fermanagh	1-07	10	Cork
7	Cillian O'Connor	Mayo	1-07	10	Sligo
7	Eoghan O'Flaherty	Kildare	1-07	10	Offaly
7	Gearóid McKiernan	Cavan	1-07	10	London
7	Adrian Marren	Sligo	1-07	10	Roscommon
7	Jamie Clarke	Armagh	2-04	10	Wicklow
13	John Heslin	Westmeath	0-09	9	Louth
13	Cillian O'Connor	Mayo	0-09	9	Galway
13	Cillian O'Connor	Mayo	1-06	9	Dublin
13	Conor McManus	Monaghan	1-06	9	Fermanagh
13	Bernard Brogan	Dublin	1-06	9	Longford
13	Bernard Brogan	Dublin	1-06	9	Fermanagh
13	Colm O'Neill	Cork	1-06	9	Kerry
13	Dean Rock	Dublin	1-06	9	Longford
13	Bernard Brogan	Dublin	2-03	9	Kildare
13	Diarmuid Connolly	Dublin	2-03	9	Kildare
13	Colm Cooper	Kerry	2-03	9	Kildare
13	Kieran Martin	Westmeath	2-03	9	Meath

=== Discipline ===
- First red card of the championship: Neil Gallagher for Donegal against Tyrone (17 May 2015)

=== Miscellaneous ===
- Tipperary and Waterford meet in the Munster championship for the first time since 2003.
- Westmeath recorded their first ever championship win over Meath in the Leinster semi-final.
- Tyrone met Limerick and Tipperary for the first time in championship history, with Tyrone coming out on top of both games.
- Under the old system, an All-Ireland semi-final would have featured Kerry vs Monaghan.

== Broadcasting rights ==
RTÉ, the national broadcaster in Ireland provided live television coverage of the championship. In the second year of a deal running from 2014 until 2016, a number of matches were also broadcast by Sky Sports, with Sky having exclusive rights to some games.

Australia's terrestrial Seven Network announced it would not broadcast Gaelic games following its coverage of the 2014 Championship.

As in the 2014 season, the GAA and RTÉ provided a streaming service called GAAGO intended to stream championship games worldwide. The subscription-based service was available to fans everywhere in the world outside of the island of Ireland, including all the games broadcast in Ireland exclusively by Sky Sports. All televised games from the football and hurling championships, as broadcast by both RTÉ and Sky were available to watch on GAAGO.

=== Live television rights ===
The following matches were broadcast live on television in Ireland.

Round	RTÉ	Sky Sports
Connacht Championship	Mayo vs Galway; Mayo vs Sligo	Sligo vs Roscommon
Munster Championship	Kerry vs Cork; Kerry vs Cork (replay)	
Leinster Championship	Dublin vs Longford; Westmeath vs Meath; Dublin vs Kildare; Dublin vs Westmeath	Laois vs Kildare
Ulster Championship	Donegal vs Tyrone; Cavan vs Monaghan; Derry vs Down; Armagh vs Donegal; Monaghan vs Donegal	Derry vs Donegal
Qualifiers	Cavan vs Roscommon	Tipperary vs Tyrone; Galway vs Derry; Westmeath vs Fermanagh; Cork vs Kildare; Sligo vs Tyrone; Donegal vs Galway
Quarter-finals	Kerry v Kildare; Dublin v Fermanagh	Monaghan v Tyrone; Mayo v Donegal
Semi-finals	Kerry v Tyrone; Dublin v Mayo	Kerry v Tyrone; Dublin v Mayo
Final	Kerry v Dublin	Kerry v Dublin

== Awards ==
The Sunday Game Team of the Year

The Sunday Game team of the year was picked on 20 September, the night of the final. Dublin's Jack McCaffrey was named as The Sunday Game player of the year.

1. Brendan Kealy (Kerry)
2. Shane Enright (Kerry)
3. Rory O'Carroll (Dublin)
4. Philly McMahon (Dublin)
5. Lee Keegan (Mayo)
6. Cian O’Sullivan (Dublin)
7. Jack McCaffrey (Dublin)
8. Anthony Maher (Kerry)
9. Brian Fenton (Dublin)
10. Mattie Donnelly (Tyrone)
11. Ciarán Kilkenny (Dublin)
12. Donnchadh Walsh (Kerry)
13. Conor McManus (Monaghan)
14. Aidan O'Shea (Mayo)
15. Bernard Brogan (Dublin)

All Star Team of the Year

The All Star football team was announced on 6 November. Dublin's Jack McCaffrey was named as the All Stars Footballer of the Year with Diarmuid O'Connor of Mayo being named as the All Stars Young Footballer of the Year.

1. Brendan Kealy (Kerry)
2. Shane Enright (Kerry)
3. Rory O'Carroll (Dublin)
4. Philly McMahon (Dublin)
5. Lee Keegan (Mayo)
6. Cian O'Sullivan (Dublin)
7. Jack McCaffrey (Dublin)
8. Brian Fenton (Dublin)
9. Anthony Maher (Kerry)
10. Mattie Donnelly (Tyrone)
11. Ciarán Kilkenny (Dublin)
12. Donnchadh Walsh (Kerry)
13. Conor McManus (Monaghan)
14. Aidan O'Shea (Mayo)
15. Bernard Brogan (Dublin)

== See also ==
- 2016 All-Ireland Minor Football Championship
- 2016 All-Ireland Under-21 Football Championship
