= Hugh McCabe =

Gaelic football manager and player

Personal information
- Native name: Aodh Mac Cába (Irish)
- Born: 1955 Aghadrumsee, County Fermanagh, Northern Ireland
- Died: 28 May 2017 (aged 62) Mullaghdun, County Fermanagh, Northern Ireland
- Occupation: PE teacher

Sport
- Sport: Gaelic football
- Position: Centre-back
Clubs
- Years: Club
- Aghadrumsee; Belcoo O'Rahilly's
Club titles
- Fermanagh titles: 0
Inter-county
- Years: County
- 1974–1988: Fermanagh
Inter-county titles
- Ulster titles: 0
- All-Irelands: 0
- NFL: 0
- All Stars: 0

Hugh McCabe (1955 – 28 May 2017) was a Gaelic football manager and player whose league and championship career at senior level with the Fermanagh county team spanned fourteen seasons from 1974 to 1988.

Born in Aghadrumsee, County Fermanagh, McCabe first played competitive Gaelic football at St Eugene's College in Rosslea. He later qualified as a physical education teacher from St Mary's University College in Belfast.

McCabe first appeared for the Aghadrumsee club at juvenile and underage levels. He later joined the Belcoo O'Rahilly's club, ending his career as a three-time county senior championship runner-up.

After lining out for Fermanagh at minor and under-21 levels, McCabe made his senior debut for the team in 1974. The highlights of his senior career include the winning of a McKenna Cup medal in 1977 and a National League Division 3 medal in 1981. McCabe took a break from inter-county football shortly after the latter victory, but returned for a second spell on the team from 1985 to 1988.

In retirement from playing McCabe managed Fermanagh in the early 1990s, taking them from Division 4 to Division 2. He also managed major clubs including Dromore, Errigal Ciarán and Mullahoran.

== Honours ==
Fermanagh

- National Football League Division 3 (1): 1980-81
- Dr McKenna Cup (1): 1977
