= Collie Curran =

Gaelic footballer

Collie Curran is a former Gaelic footballer who played for Lisnaskea Emmetts and the Fermanagh county team. He played at right half-forward. Alongside players such as Paul Brewster, he has been described as one of the leading Fermanagh inter-county footballers of the 1990s, and of other decades.
