= Fermanagh county football team =

Gaelic football team

Fermanagh
- Sport: Football
- Irish: Fear Manach
- Nickname(s): The Ernesiders
- County board: Fermanagh GAA
- Manager: Kieran Donnelly
- Captain: Declan McCusker
- Home venue(s): Brewster Park, Enniskillen

Recent competitive record
- Current All-Ireland status: Ulster (QF) in 2024
- Last championship title: None
- Current NFL Division: 3 (7th in 2024 Division 2; relegated)
- Last league title: None
First colours	Second colours

The Fermanagh county football team (/fərˈmænə/ fər-MAN-ə) represents Fermanagh GAA, the county board of the Gaelic Athletic Association, in the Gaelic sport of football. The team competes in the three major annual inter-county competitions; the All-Ireland Senior Football Championship, the Ulster Senior Football Championship and the National Football League.

Fermanagh's home ground is Brewster Park, Enniskillen. The team's manager is Kieran Donnelly.

The team has never won the Ulster Senior Championship, the All-Ireland Senior Championship or the National League, the only county besides Wicklow never to have won its provincial championship.

== History ==
Fermanagh is the only team in the province of Ulster to have never won the Ulster Senior Football Championship (SFC).

Fermanagh has reached five Ulster SFC semi-finals since 1982.

Fragments of a poem from 1806 describe a football match between Louth and Fermanagh at Inniskeen in County Monaghan.

=== 20th century ===
Fermanagh defeated Cavan in the 1914 Ulster SFC semi-final and the Ulster Council nominated the county to play Wexford in the All-Ireland Senior Football Championship (SFC) semi-final. Because the train schedules did not allow them to get back for Sunday night, and the Great Northern Railway Company refused to run a special train because they were opposed to sport on Sunday, Fermanagh had to abdicate the responsibility to Monaghan (the Monaghan team later defeated Fermanagh in the Ulster SFC final anyway).

One of Ulster's great footballers, Armagh-born Jim McCullough, played for Fermanagh in the mid-1930s and helped them reach the 1935 Ulster SFC final and 1936 National League final.

Peter McGinnity was the outstanding player of the under-21 team which reached two All-Ireland finals and defeated Derry and Tyrone to reach the 1982 Ulster SFC final, Despite a Peter McGinnity goal that put Fermanagh into the lead with 20 minutes remaining, the county lost 0–10 to 1–4 to Armagh.

Under manager Pat King, the county achieved a hat-trick of successes in 1997 in the B Championship, Dr McKenna Cup and Division 4 of the National League.

=== 21st century ===
Fermanagh was a beneficiary of the change to the GAA championship in the 2000s.

In 2003, the county defeated Donegal in the Ulster SFC, then Cavan, Meath and Mayo in All-Ireland SFC qualifiers to reach a first All-Ireland SFC quarter-final.

Charlie Mulgrew was appointed manager in January 2004.

The county went to a replayed All-Ireland SFC semi-final in 2004, defeating (in the All-Ireland SFC qualifiers) Meath, Cork and getting past Donegal with a one-point win after extra-time, Then, most memorably of all, Armagh in the All-Ireland SFC quarter-final, thanks to a late point by Tom Brewster. A loss to Mayo in the semi-final replay ended the county's season. In 2006, despite running All-Ireland SFC favourites Armagh close twice in the Ulster SFC, Fermanagh yet again ended the season without a trophy after losing to Donegal in the fourth round of the All-Ireland SFC qualifiers. 2007 brought the loss of the county's National League Division 1 status, having failed to register a single point from its seven match campaign. Fermanagh performed better in the Ulster SFC however, only losing by an injury-time point to Tyrone. The county then defeated Wexford (for the second consecutive season) in the first round of the All-Ireland SFC qualifiers. However, it was unable to record a third win in four seasons over Meath at Navan in July, losing narrowly by two points despite dominating the latter stages. Charlie Mulgrew, manager for four seasons, stood down after this match, to be succeeded by Malachy O'Rourke. O'Rourke's first season featured a first appearance in an Ulster SFC final for 26 years, lost eventually to Armagh in a replay. His time as manager ended in 2010, after Fermanagh were relegated to Division 4 of the National Football League and a heavy defeat to Monaghan in the 2010 Ulster SFC semi-final.

Peter Canavan served as manager for two years, achieving promotion to Division 3 and a win against Westmeath in the All-Ireland SFC qualifiers. Canavan departed in 2013, with the county board acknowledging that he had taken the helm "at a very difficult time" and his management team stating that "significant progress has been made. The senior footballers now representing their county are fully committed, unified and ambitious".

In an unexpected development, Pete McGrath was appointed as Canavan's successor in November 2013, seeing off the challenge of former player Peter McGinnity, Gerry Moane and Kevin McStay. He brought the team to the 2015 All-Ireland SFC quarter-final before the players forced him out in 2017, shortly after he had said he would like to continue for another season. The player heave against McGrath drew criticism from observers outside the county.

Ryan McMenamin's time in charge was affected by the impact of the COVID-19 pandemic on Gaelic games. He departed as manager in August 2021. Former player Kieran Donnelly replaced him.

== Support ==
A supporters' club, called Club Eirne, exists.

== Panel ==
Team as per Fermanagh vs Cavan in the NFL Division 3 Final, 1 April 2023

No.	Player	Position	Club
1	Sean McNally	Goalkeeper	Teemore
2	Lee Cullen	Right Corner Back	Belnaleck
3	Che Cullen	Full back	Belnaleck
4	Luke Flanagan	Left Corner Back	Derrylin
5	Johnny Cassidy	Right half back	Enniskillen Gaels
6	Shane McGullion	Centre back	Derrygonnelly
7	Cian McManus	Left half back	Teemore
8	Ryan Jones	Midfield	Derrygonnelly
9	Brandon Horan	Midfield	Enniskillen Gaels
10	Josh Largo Elis	Right half forward	Irvinestown
11	Ryan Lyons	Centre forward	Erne Gaels
12	Ronan McCaffrey	Left half forward	Teemore
13	Ultán Kelm	Right corner forward	Erne Gaels
14	Darragh McGurn	Full forward	Belnaleck
17	Aidan Breen	Left corner forward	Tempo

No.	Player	Position	Club
16	Jack Kelly	Substitute	Derrygonnelly
15	Seán Quigley	Substitute	Roslea
18	Tommy McCaffrey	Substitute	Erne Gaels
19	Conall Jones	Substitute	Derrygonnelly
20	Fionan O'Brien	Substitute	Devenish
21	Declan McCusker (c)	Substitute	Ederney
22	Conor McGee	Substitute	Ederney
23	Conor McShea	Substitute	Enniskillen Gaels
24	Garvan Jones	Substitute	Derrygonnelly
25	Garrett Cavanagh	Substitute	Belnaleck
26	Oisín Smyth	Substitute	Derrygonnelly

== Management team ==
- Manager: Kieran Donnelly
- Selector: Ger Treacy
- Forward coach: Ronan O'Neill (Omagh St Enda's), from the 2023 season
- Other: Ferghal Quinn, Pat Cadden, Leon Carters, Stephen Carters, Niall Smyth, Stephen Jackson

== Managerial history ==
Fermanagh appointed an outside manager, Charlie Mulgrew from Donegal, to lead the team to the 2004 All-Ireland SFC semi-finals (a first in the team's history). Pat King and John Maughan had also been brought in, from Tyrone and Mayo respectively, for the 1996 and 2000 All-Ireland Senior B Football Championship titles. Other outside managers of Fermanagh include P. J. McGowan, Peter Canavan, Pete McGrath and Ryan McMenamin.

P. J. McGowan 1991–91

Huge McCabe 1991–94

Terry Ferguson 1994–96

Pa King 1996–00

John Maughan 2000–01

Dominic Crigan 2001–03

Charlie Mulgrew 2004–07

Malachy O'Rourke 2007–10

Peter Canavan 2010–13

Pete McGrath 2013–17

Rory Gallagher 2017–19

Ryan McMenamin 2019–21

Kieran Donnelly 2021–

== Players ==
=== Notable players ===
Below is The Irish News 125 Fermanagh Player List:

- Mick Brewster (Enniskillen Gaels)
- Tom Brewster (Enniskillen Gaels)
- Paul Brewster (Enniskillen Gaels)
- Issac Gerard Curran (Lisnaskea)
- Ciaran Campbell (Tempo)
- James Cassidy (Teemore)
- Owen Clerkin (Roslea)
- Dominic Corrigan (Kinawley)
- Paul McKenna (Kinawley)
- Collie Curran (Lisnaskea)
- John Donnelly (Trillick)
- Tommy Durnien (Lisnaskea)
- Raymond Gallagher (Erne Gaels)
- Rory Gallagher (Erne Gaels)
- Peter Greene (Belcoo)
- Vincent Greene (Kinawley)
- Eamonn Maguire (St Patrick's)
- Stephen Maguire (Belcoo)
- Johnny Monaghan (St Joseph's)
- Cormac McAdam (Lisnaskea)
- Ryan McCluskey (Enniskillen Gaels)
- Eamonn McDonnell (Knockninny Harps)
- Peter McGinnity (Roslea)
- Martin McGrath (St Joseph's)
- Sean McGrath (St Joseph's)
- John Hanna (Brookeborough)
- Paddy McGuinness (Devenish)
- Frank McGurn (Belnaleck)
- Sean Maguire/Fr Ignatius McQuillan (Newtownbutler)
- Barry Owens (Teemore)
- Barney Reilly (Teemore)
- J. J. Treacy (Devenish)
- P. T. Treacy (Devenish)
- Niall Corrigan (Enniskillen Gaels)
- Seán Quigley (Roslea)
- Ruari Corrigan (Kinawley)
- Seamie Quigley (Roslea)

=== Records ===
- Rory Gallagher, with 3–9 against Monaghan in 2002, matched the 5–3 record set by Johnny Joyce of Dublin in 1960 for the highest individual scorer in any championship football match. Cillian O'Connor's four goals (accompanied by nine points) in the 2020 All-Ireland Senior Football Championship semi-final at Croke Park broke that record after eighteen years.
- In 2015, Cillian O'Connor was in the running for the Golden Boot and initially finished tied for top with Fermanagh's Seán Quigley. However, following a review of Mayo's championship winning DVD, the Gaelic Athletic Association realised they had incorrectly noted O'Connor's score as they had recorded him as having scored 1-6 but he had actually scored 1–7. As a result, O'Connor's tally was increased by 1 which allowed him to claim the Golden Boot.

==== Most appearances ====
Between 2008 and 2021:

- 1 Ryan Jones (Donnelly's midfield partner, 117 appearances, including 106 starts)
- 2 Eoin Donnelly, Coa (midfielder, 114 appearances)
- 3 Barry Mulrone, Devenish (110 appearances)
- 4 Declan McCusker, Ederney (110 appearances)
- 5 Seán Quigley, Roslea (forward, 101 appearances)
- 6 Aidan Breen, Tempo (92 appearances)
- 7 Mickey Jones, Derrygonnelly (defender, 89 appearances)
- 8 Tomás Corrigan (corner-forward, 85 appearances)
- 9 Paul McCusker, Ederney (86 appearances)
- 10 Ryan McCluskey (80 appearances)

=== All Stars ===
Fermanagh has 4 All Stars, as of 2006. 3 different players have won, as of 2006. No player has won more than two All Stars.

- 1982: Peter McGinnity
- 2004: Barry Owens, Martin McGrath
- 2006: Barry Owens^{2nd}

== Competitive record ==
Fermanagh has never won an All-Ireland Senior Football Championship title, although Charlie Mulgrew led the team to the 2004 All-Ireland SFC semi-finals (a first in the team's history).

Fermanagh has never won a National Football League title.

Fermanagh won two All-Ireland Senior B Football Championship titles, in 1996 and 2000.

Pat King managed the team to its first title in 1996. Below is the team that defeated Longford in the final.

- 1 Cormac McAdam
- 2 P. Courtney
- 3 S. Breen
- 4 C. Fitzpatrick
- 5 Raymond Curran
- 6 B. King
- 7 Justin Gilheaney
- 8 Paul Brewster
- 9 Liam McBarron
- 10 Kieran Donnelly
- 11 Collie Curran
- 12 M. Greene
- 13 N. Rooney
- 14 Rory Gallagher
- 15 Shane King

Subs used: T. Callaghan for ?; Raymond Gallagher for ?

John Maughan managed the team to its second title in 2000. Below is the team that defeated Wicklow in the final.

== Honours ==
Official honours, with additions noted.

=== National ===
- All-Ireland Senior Football Championship
  - (bronze) Semi-finalists (1): 2004
- All-Ireland Senior B Football Championship
  - (gold) Winners (2): 1996, 2000
- All-Ireland Junior Football Championship
  - (gold) Winners (1): 1959
- All-Ireland Under-21 Football Championship
  - (silver) Runners-up (2): 1970, 1971
- All-Ireland Vocational Schools Championship
  - (gold) Winners (2): 1966, 1996 St Comhghalls Lisnaskea

=== Provincial ===
- Ulster Senior Football Championship
  - (silver) Runners-up (6): 1914, 1935, 1945, 1982, 2008, 2018
- Dr McKenna Cup
  - (gold) Winners (4): 1930, 1933, 1977, 1997
- Ulster Junior Football Championship
  - (gold) Winners (2): 1943, 1959
  - (silver) Runners-up (3): 1942, 1949, 1971
- Ulster Under-21 Football Championship
  - (gold) Winners (3): 1970, 1971, 1994
  - (silver) Runners-up (2): 1997, 2001
- Ulster Minor Football Championship
  - (silver) Runners-up (4): 1967, 1970, 1971, 2003
