= Tomás Corrigan =

Fermanagh Gaelic footballer

Personal information
- Native name: Tomás Ó Corragáin (Irish)
- Born: August 1, 1990 (age 36)
- Occupation: Solicitor

Sport
- Sport: Gaelic football
- Position: Forward
Clubs
- Years: Club
- Kinawley; St Oliver Plunketts
Inter-county
- Years: County
- Fermanagh

Tomás Corrigan (born August 1, 1990) is a Gaelic footballer who has played for the Fermanagh GAA, Kinawley, Dublin GAA, St Oliver Plunketts, and the Fermanagh county team.

== Career ==
Corrigan made his Inter County Debut Date in January 2010.

Corrigan played for Fermanagh, who reached the 2015 All-Ireland Senior Football Championship quarter-finals. He became well-known after Fermanagh beat Westmeath the same year.

He was the fourth highest scorer in Championship 2016, making a higher scoring average than marquee forwards Cillian O'Connor, Conor McManus, and Michael Quinlivan.

In 2016, Corrigan transferred from Kinawley to St Oliver Plunketts in Dublin.

In 2018, he helped to take the Fermanagh team to the 2018 Ulster Senior Football Championship final. He then travelled to Mexico and Argentina.

In total, he has made 85 appearances as a corner-forward. He has been critical of The Sunday Game on several occasions.

== Personal life ==
Corrigan was born in 1990 and attended St Michael's College, Enniskillen. He went on to study Law at Trinity College Dublin, graduating in 2013.

He is a solicitor and has previously worked for the law firm Arthur Cox. In 2021, he moved to the law firm Mason Hayes & Curran in Dublin.

His father Dominic Corrigan played for and managed Fermanagh. His brother Ruari plays for Fermanagh and Kinawley.
