= Gerry Moane =

Gaelic football manager

Sport
Inter-county management
- Years: Team
- 2016–2020: Tyrone

Gerry Moane is a Gaelic football manager. Moane had been linked with the Fermanagh vacancy in 2013. Shortly afterwards, he took charge of the Tyrone ladies' Gaelic football team, a role he held until 2020.
