= Peter McGinnity =

Irish Gaelic footballer and manager (born 1953)

Personal information
- Native name: Peadar Mac (Irish)
- Born: October 1953 (age 73) Roslea, County Fermanagh
- Occupation: Teacher (retired)
- Height: 6 ft 4 in (193 cm)

Sport
- Sport: Gaelic Football
- Position: Right Half Forward
Clubs
- Years: Club
- 1968–1998 1976–1979: Roslea Shamrocks; St John's
Club titles
- Fermanagh titles: 3 (+ 3 Antrim)
- Ulster titles: 1
Inter-county
- Years: County
- 1970–1987, 1991: Fermanagh
Inter-county titles
- Ulster titles: 0
- All Stars: 1

Peter McGinnity (born October 1953) is a Gaelic football manager and former player who hails from Roslea in County Fermanagh, Northern Ireland. He was inducted into the Hall of Fame in March 2024 at the Gaelic Life Club All-Star awards.
