= Morgan O'Flaherty =

Irish Gaelic footballer

Personal information
- Native name: Morgan Ó Flatharta (Irish)
- Born: Newbridge, County Kildare, Ireland
- Occupation: Civil Engineer
- Height: 1.81 m (5 ft 11 in)

Sport
- Sport: Gaelic Football
- Position: Centre Back
Club
- Years: Club
- Carbury
Inter-county
- Years: County
- 2008-2014: Kildare
Inter-county titles
- NFL: 1

Morgan O'Flaherty is a Gaelic footballer for Kildare. He plays Gaelic football for his local club Carbury and has been a member of the Kildare senior team since 2008. His younger brother Eoghan is also a member of the senior team.
