= Aidan Breen =

Fermanagh Gaelic footballer

Personal information
- Occupation: Electrician

Sport
Club
- Years: Club
- Tempo Maguires
Inter-county
- Years: County
- Fermanagh

Aidan Breen is a Gaelic footballer. He plays senior football for Tempo Maguires and the Fermanagh county team.

Breen is the son of Jamesie and Rita Breen. He tested positive for COVID-19 on 3 October 2020 after attending a Fermanagh training session the previous evening. He volunteered for the test on a "precautionary" basis (not believing himself to be a close contact) because of an outbreak locally, including in a shop he had visited on 1 October, and among other members of the Fermanagh team. Breen became the first current inter-county player to discuss his experience of the virus in detail as Fermanagh unsuccessfully attempted to have their next National Football League game against Clare in Ennis postponed. He experienced "a couple of very tough days", with low energy, a headache and breathing problems, and when these subsided he still had difficulty running. Breen travelled to the game in his own car, as became the established practice to combat the virus.

As of the end of the 2024 season, he had made 120 appearances for Fermanagh.
