= Dominic Corrigan (Gaelic footballer) =

Fermanagh Gaelic footballer and manager

Personal information
- Native name: Damhnaic Ó Corragáin (Irish)
- Nickname: Dom
- Born: 1962 (age 63–64)
- Occupation: Schoolteacher
- Height: 5 ft 10 in (178 cm)

Sport
- Sport: Gaelic football
- Position: Full-forward
Club
- Years: Club
- Kinawley
College
- Years: College
- Jordanstown
Inter-county
- Years: County
- Fermanagh

Dominic "Dom" Corrigan (born 1962) is a Gaelic footballer and manager. He played for Kinawley and the Fermanagh county team. He later managed the Fermanagh and Sligo teams.

== Family life ==
Corrigan received his education at St Aidan's in Derrylin and at St Michael's College, Enniskillen (where he would later go on to teach at). He then went to Jordanstown, winning an All-Ireland Colleges Trench Cup medal in 1984. He moved home to Enniskillen in 1987.

A member of a family of eight, Corrigan married Mary (née McCabe) from Aghadrumsee. Their first child, Tomás Corrigan, would go on to play for Fermanagh. He has another son, Ruáirí, who is also a Gaelic footballer. His nephew is Cavans Gearóid McKiernan.

== Playing career ==
Corrigan is a Kinawley clubman. He made his debut for Kinawley as an eleven-year-old goalkeeper in 1973.

Corrigan played as a full-forward for Fermanagh. He was involved in the 1982 campaign, when he scored 1–3 against Tyrone in that year's Ulster Senior Football Championship (SFC) semi-final. Between 1982 and 1992, Corrigan won a Division 2 County League medal, an Intermediate Championship medal in 1988 (to go with the won he one in 1981) and multiple underage souvenirs.

Ten years later, at the age of thirty, he was one of two remaining players.

== Managerial career ==
Corrigan first picked up his whistle at St Michael's College, Enniskillen in the 1980s and went on to become "synonymous with Gaelic football" there. He led the college to a first Hogan Cup (All-Ireland) title in 2019.

Corrigan also managed Fermanagh and Sligo during the 2000s. He stepped down as Fermanagh manager in December 2003. As a 41-year-old that year, he was the youngest inter-county manager on the scene. He subsequently left his position as Sligo manager, due to difficult circumstances in 2006.

Corrigan won several SFCs in club management. As of December 2021, he had won championships with five clubs in three counties, a total of seven County Senior Championship titles. He was involved in coaching along with Pete McMahon as Castleblayney won a Monaghan crown in 1999 and 2000. Additionally, Corrigan managed Carrickmore in 2004, Clontibret in 2014, and Killyclogher in 2016. He led Ballinamore to a Leitrim Senior Football Championship title in 2021 when he was close to sixty years of age. This was a first SFC title for Leitrim GAA's most successful club since 1990, as well as Corrigan's sixth county title. He has spoken in support of the quality of football played in Leitrim.

Sporting positions
Preceded by John Maughan	Fermanagh Senior Football Manager; 2001–2003	Succeeded by Charlie Mulgrew
Preceded by James Kearins	Sligo Senior Football Manager; 2004–2006	Succeeded by Tommy Breheny
