= Tommy Breheny =

Gaelic football manager

Personal information
- Born: 1967 or 1968 (age 57–58)

Sport
Club management
- Years: Club
- Around 2001: St Mary's
- 1
Inter-county management
- Years: Team
- 2006–2007: Sligo
Inter-county titles as manager
County	League	Province	All-Ireland
Sligo		1	1

Tommy Breheny is a former Gaelic football manager and player. He managed his native Sligo between 2006 and 2007. In that time he led the county to a Connacht Senior Football Championship. Breheny won four Sligo Senior Football Championships as a player with the St Mary's club and led it to a further Sligo SFC as manager in 2001. He is married with four children.

Initially serving as part of Sligo manager Dominic Corrigan's backroom team, Breheny succeeded Corrigan for 2006 and 2007, then resigned as Sligo manager in October 2007. He is the older brother of Mark Breheny, who played for Sligo at the time.

Sporting positions
Preceded by Dominic Corrigan	Sligo Senior Football Manager; 2006–2007	Succeeded by Tommy Jordan
