= Ryan McCluskey =

Irish Gaelic footballer

Personal information
- Born: 2 June 1981 (age 45) Enniskillen, Northern Ireland
- Height: 1.78 m (5 ft 10 in)

Sport
- Sport: Gaelic football
- Position: Centre Back
Club
- Years: Club
- 1998–: Enniskillen Gaels
Club titles
- Fermanagh titles: 7
Inter-county
- Years: County
- 2003–: Fermanagh

Ryan McCluskey (born 2 June 1981) is a Gaelic footballer who plays for Enniskillen Gaels and the Fermanagh county team.

He previously played association football for NIFL Premiership clubs Portadown and Dungannon Swifts, as a midfielder.

As of the end of the 2021 season, he had made 80 appearances for Fermanagh.
