= Justin Gilheaney =

Gaelic footballer

Justin Gilheaney is a former Gaelic footballer who played for the Fermanagh county team. He was one of the team's main players during the 1990s and early 2000s.

He played as a centre half-back.
