= St Eugene's College =

Defunct secondary school in Northern Ireland

Coordinates: 54.238°N 7.172°W

- Irish: Coláiste Naomh Eoghan

Information
- Established: 1968
- Closed: 2017
- Gender: Mixed

St Eugene's College (Irish: Coláiste Naomh Eoghan) was a secondary school in Rosslea, County Fermanagh, Northern Ireland. It was a voluntary maintained co-educational school and was within the Western Education and Library Board area.

The school opened in 1968 and closed in 2017.
