= Cormac McAdam =

Fermanagh Gaelic football goalkeeper

Personal information
- Nickname: "Cat"
- Born: 1968 or 1969 (age 57–58)

Sport
- Sport: Gaelic football
- Position: Goalkeeper
Clubs
- Years: Club
- Lisnaskea Emmetts; Donegal Boston
Inter-county
- Years: County
- c. 1990s: Fermanagh

Cormac McAdam (born December 1968) is a former Gaelic footballer who played as a goalkeeper for Lisnaskea Emmetts and the Fermanagh county team.

Nicknamed "Cat", he captained his county to an All-Ireland B Football Championship in 1996. The Irish News described McAdam as "arguably Fermanagh's finest-ever goalkeeper".

McAdam also played for Donegal Boston.

In February 2007 while working with his plastering company he fell from a height breaking his back and became confined to wheelchair. He is married to Christine and they have three children.
