= Paul Brewster (Gaelic footballer) =

Fermanagh Gaelic footballer

Personal information
- Born: 20 August 1971 (age 55) Enniskillen, County Fermanagh
- Height: 6 ft 0 in (183 cm)

Sport
- Sport: Gaelic football
- Position: Midfield
Club
- Years: Club
- Enniskillen Gaels
Club titles
- Fermanagh titles: 9
College
- Years: College
- Queen's University Belfast
College titles
- Sigerson titles: 1
Inter-county
- Years: County
- 1990–2003: Fermanagh

Paul Brewster (born 20 August 1971) is a former Gaelic footballer who played for the Fermanagh county team for a number of years. He played his club football with Enniskillen Gaels, with whom he won Fermanagh Senior Football Championships in 1992, 1998, 1999, 2000, 2001, 2002, 2003 and 2006. He won three Fermanagh Minor Football Championships. He played for Queen's University Belfast, winning a Sigerson Cup as captain in 1993. He played for Ireland in the 1998 International Rules Series. As of 2015, he was "helping out behind the scenes" with his local Bellaghy club.
