= Eoghan O'Flaherty =

Irish Gaelic footballer

Personal information
- Native name: Eoghan Ó Flaithearta (Irish)
- Born: Carbury, County Kildare

Sport
- Sport: Gaelic football
- Position: Centre-Forward
Club
- Years: Club
- Carbury
Inter-county
- Years: County
- 2009-2016: Kildare
Inter-county titles
- Leinster titles: 1
- All Stars: 0

Eoghan O'Flaherty is a Gaelic footballer from Kildare. He played club football for his local Carbury and was a member of the Kildare senior squad from 2009 to 2016. His older brother Morgan was also a member of the team. Eoin was part of the Kildare under 21 team that lost the All Ireland Under 21 final in 2008. in 2022, O'Flaherty transferred to the St Josephs club in Laois, winning a Laois Senior Football Championship medal with them in 2023.
