= Seán Quigley =

Fermanagh Gaelic footballer

Personal information
- Native name: Seán Ó Coigligh (Irish)
- Born: 1992 (age 33–34) Roslea, County Fermanagh,

Sport
- Sport: Gaelic football
- Position: Full-forward
Club
- Years: Club
- Roslea Shamrocks
Club titles
- Fermanagh titles: 4
Inter-county
Years	County	Apps (scores)
2011–	Fermanagh	18 (8–68)
Inter-county titles
- Ulster titles: 0
- All-Irelands: 0
- NFL: 0
- All Stars: 0

Seán Quigley (born 1992) is a Gaelic footballer whose league and championship career at senior level with the Fermanagh county team began with his debut in 2011. He is from Roslea, County Fermanagh, Northern Ireland.

== Career ==
Quigley plays his club football for Roslea Shamrocks GFC. He made his inter-county debut for Fermanagh in 2011 while still playing Gaelic football at school due to a large number Fermanagh footballers walking away from playing for the county. His first game was against London at Emerald GAA Grounds in London. In 2014, he was dropped from the Fermanagh team after being found playing an association football game on the same day as a Fermanagh match.

He became the highest scorer in the National Football League and was the second highest in the All-Ireland Senior Football Championship in 2015. He would have won the Golden Boot had it not been for a technical error by the GAA who had failed to count an extra point for Mayo's Cillian O'Connor which was noticed on a DVD, which gave the award to O'Connor. As a result, he was nominated for the season's GAA GPA All Stars Awards. He gained notoriety after staying up before a match against Laois and eating a whole pizza at 2am, with the pizza shop giving him two free pizzas upon his next visit.

In 2016, he was banned for one match by the Gaelic Athletic Association for turning off the lights in the Athletic Grounds tunnel during a match against Armagh, which resulted in Fermanagh being fined €5,000. In 2020, Quigley announced he was stepping back from county football as he felt he was not enjoying it.

As of the end of the 2021 season, he had made 101 appearances for Fermanagh.

== Personal life ==
Quigley was educated at St Michael's School in Enniskillen. He has two brothers Conor and Seamus, both of whom are also Gaelic footballers who have played for Fermanagh.
