= Pat King (Gaelic footballer) =

Irish Gaelic footballer

Personal information
- Native name: Padraig Ó Cionga (Irish)
- Born: 1947 Trillick, County Tyrone, Northern Ireland
- Died: 13 April 2015 (aged 67–68) Lisnaskea, County Fermanagh, Northern Ireland
- Occupation: Secondary school teacher

Sport
- Sport: Gaelic football
- Position: Full-back
Clubs
- Years: Club
- Trillick St Macartan's; Lisnaskea
Club titles
- Tyrone titles: 5
Inter-county
- Years: County
- Tyrone
Inter-county titles
- Ulster titles: 1
- All-Irelands: 0
- NFL: 0
- All Stars: 0

Patrick "Pat" King (1947 – 13 April 2015) was an Irish Gaelic footballer who played as a full-back at senior level for the Tyrone county team.

Born in Trillick, County Tyrone, King first played competitive Gaelic football in his youth. He played inter-county football as a member of the Tyrone senior team in the 1970s. During his career he won one Ulster Senior Football Championship medal.

As a member of the Ulster inter-provincial team on a number of occasions, King won one Railway Cup medal. At club level he was a five-time Tyrone Senior Football Championship medallist with Trillick St Macartan's and won one senior championship medal with Lisnaskea.

In retirement from playing, King became involved in team management and coaching. At club level he served as manager of the Lisnaskea senior team while he also took charge of the Fermanagh senior team.
