= John Maughan =

Gaelic footballer, football manager and sports administrator

Personal information
- Born: 1962 (age 63–64)

Sport
Inter-county management
- Years: Team
- 1990–1994 1995–1999 2000–2001 2002–2005 2005–2008 2018–2022: Clare; Mayo; Fermanagh; Mayo; Roscommon; Offaly
Inter-county titles as manager
County	League	Province	All-Ireland
Clare		1	1

John Maughan (born 1962) is an Irish Gaelic football manager and former player, who most recently managed the Offaly football team.

He is also a former manager of the Mayo, Clare, Roscommon and Fermanagh senior football teams. Maughan is only the third man to lead five different county teams and the first to complete a "slam", with at least one of these county teams coming from each of Ireland's four provinces.

== Early life ==
Maughan is originally from Crossmolina. He comes from a family of six children. He was the only one sent to boarding school, which he attended at Moate's Carmelite College. After school he joined the Irish Army. He is a graduate of University College Galway. He attended the university in the early 1980s.

== Army career ==
Maughan was an offer in the Irish Army from 1979 to 1999. He reached the rank of Captain and was based in Renmore Barracks Dún Uí Mhaoilíosa in Galway. When he was appointed to the Mayo job, he commuted from Cyprus for the first couple of games as he was serving with the United Nations.

== Playing career ==
Maughan won a Hogan Cup medal with Moate's Carmelite College in 1980. He also won two Sigerson Cups with University College Galway in the early 1980s. This, alongside a spell with the Mayo under-21 team, led to Maughan being called up to the senior county team. Surgery on his knee cartilage in 1986 led to the end of his days as a player. He had four more operations but on the knee cartilage but was informed three years later that he could no longer play at inter-county level. He continued to play locally, switching base in 1994 and transferring to Castlebar Mitchels in the expectation of getting to play junior football but was a runner-up in that year's Mayo Senior Football Championship final. In a 1995 Mayo Senior Football Championship quarter-final Maughan sustained a broken jaw. After being brought to Dublin's Mater Hospital, a story in a newspaper led to bother as he had flown back from Cyprus where he was on peacekeeping duty with the Irish Army.

== Coaching career ==
Mayo's manager when Maughan's playing days ended was John O'Mahony. O'Mahony retained Maughan's services as a team physical trainer.

A call came from Clare GAA one evening to ask if Maughan would become coach for the 1990 season. Discovering that no manager had yet been appointed Maughan asked if he could take the post. He did so, at the age of 28. Eleven players attended Maughan's first training session in Crusheen.

He led Clare to the 1992 Munster Senior Football Championship.

After finishing as Clare manager, Maughan went to Cyprus for United Nations peacekeeping duty in Nicosia.

He was appointed manager of the Mayo county team while still based in Cyprus and commuted for several games at the start of his spell in charge.

He led his native county to the successive All-Ireland Senior Football Championship final defeats in 1996, 1997. He returned for a second spell in charge and led his native county to a further All-Ireland Senior Football Championship final defeat in 2004.

In between his spells with Mayo, he had a short stint as Fermanagh manager (winning an All-Ireland 'B' Football Championship) and, after taking charge of Mayo for the second time, he was manager of Roscommon. He resigned as Roscommon manager in the spring of 2008.

He commuted from his home in Castlebar to manage Offaly. Maughan announced his departure as Offaly manager in July 2022 after a four-year spell in charge during which he achieved promotion for Offaly to Division 2 of the National Football League (though relegation to Division 3 followed the next year) and advanced to the semi-final of the inaugural 2022 Tailteann Cup.

Maughan has also led NUI Galway GAA.

== Personal life ==
Maughan is married to Audrey, and lives in Castlebar. He is a grandfather. He had surgery on his back in 2019.

As of 2021, he was working as a Procurement Officer at Mayo County Council, while, as of 2019, Maughan is a member of the board of Sport Ireland.

Though fully-vaccinated, Maughan isolated at his home in Enniscrone after contracting COVID-19 in 2021 (his sense of taste and smell he said were "completely gone").
