= 2013 Down county football team season =

Down county football team
2013 season
- Manager: James McCartan Jnr
- Stadium: Páirc Esler, Newry
- NFL D1: 8th (relegated)
- All-Ireland SFC: Round 2 qualifier
- Ulster SFC: Semi-finalist
- Dr McKenna Cup: Semi-finalist
- 2013 O'Fiaich Cup: Group stage (3rd)

The following is a summary of Down county football team's 2013 season.

== Kits ==
McKenna Cup and National League kits

Home	Away

Championship kits

Home	Away

== Competitions ==
Win Draw Loss Postponed/Cancelled

=== Dr McKenna Cup ===
Down made a strong start to their 2013 campaign with McKenna Cup group victories over Cavan and neighbouring county Armagh. Queen's University withdrew from the competition over a row regarding player availability and the fixture was simply written off. Down progressed into the latter stages of the McKenna Cup but fell short, against Monaghan, of a place in the final.

==== Fixtures ====
Date	Round	Home	Score	Away	Ground
6 Jan	Group	Cavan	0-12 v 1-11	Down	Kingspan Breffni Park, Cavan
13 Jan	Group	Down		Queen's	Páirc Esler, Newry
16 Jan	Group	Down	2-11 v 1-10	Armagh	Páirc Esler, Newry
20 Jan	Semi-final	Down	0-13 v 1-12	Monaghan	Athletic Grounds, Armagh

Queen's withdraw from the McKenna Cup over a player availability dispute.

==== Table ====
Qualified for next round

Team	Pld	W	D	L	F	A	Diff	Pts
Down	2	2	0	0	3–22	1-22	6	4
Cavan	2	1	0	1	3–21	2-22	2	2
Armagh	2	0	0	2	2–21	5-21	-8	0

Semi-finals		Final
Monaghan	1-12
Down	0-13	Monaghan	1-10
Tyrone	2-09	Tyrone	4-11
Fermanagh	0-07

==== Results ====
6 January 2013
14:00
Group

Cavan	0-12 — 1-11	Down
M Dunne (0-9), G McKiernan (0-3)	Report	P McComiskey (1-0), C Harrison (0-3), R Kelly (0-2), L Doyle (0-2), B Coulter (0-2), R Boyle (0-1), D Savage (0-1)

Kingspan Breffni Park, Cavan
Referee: N Cullen
16 January 2013
19:30
Group

Down	2-11 — 1-10	Armagh
P McComiskey (1-5), C Laverty (0-2), C Harrison (0-2), B Coulter (0-1), L Doyle (0-1), K McKernan (1-0)	Report	S Forker (0-6), G McCooey (1-1), M Stevenson (0-2), C McKeever (0-1)

Páirc Esler, Newry
Referee: Sean Hurson (Tyrone)
20 January 2013
14:00
Semi-finals

Monaghan	1-12 — 0-13	Down
Conor McManus 1-7, Darren Hughes 0-2, Dick Clerkin 0-1, Owen Duffy 0-1, Paul Finlay 0-1.	Report	Mark Poland 0-4, Donal O'Hare 0-3, Connaire Harrison 0-2, Ryan Mallon 0-1, Keith Quinn 0-1, Arthur McConville 0-1, Danny Savage 0-1.

Athletic Grounds, Armagh
Referee: Noel Mooney

=== National Football League Division 1 ===
Down looked deserving relegation favourites in the National Football League Division 1, as they lost their first three games, two of which were at home. Down looked close to beating Cork at home but fell to a very late goal. A comeback looked on the cards as Down went out and beat Mayo at Páirc Esler; however, defeats to Kerry and Dublin sealed Down's fate and relegation was a certainty despite an impressive 3–13 to 1-12 hammering of Kildare in Newry.

==== Fixtures ====
Date	Round	Home	Score	Away	Ground
2 Feb	Group	Down	1-08 v 1-11	Tyrone	Páirc Esler, Newry
9 Feb	Group	Donegal	0-12 v 0-07	Down	MacCumhaill Park, Ballybofey
3 Mar	Group	Down	1-17 v 3-12	Cork	Páirc Esler, Newry
9 Mar	Group	Down	0-13 v 0-11	Mayo	Páirc Esler, Newry
16 Mar	Group	Kerry	0-11 v 1-05	Down	Austin Stack Park, Tralee
23 Mar	Group	Dublin	1-15 v 0-09	Down	Croke Park, Dublin
7 Apr	Group	Down	3-13 v 1-12	Kildare	Páirc Esler, Newry

==== Table ====
Compete in Division 1 semi-finals Automatic relegation to Division 2

Team	Pld	W	D	L	F	A	Diff	Pts
Dublin	7	5	1	1	8-105	5-75	39	11
Tyrone	7	5	0	2	6-87	4-85	8	10
Kildare	7	4	0	3	10-74	8-93	-13	8
Mayo	7	3	0	4	2-87	5-75	3	6
Cork	7	3	0	4	6-73	4-85	-6	6
Kerry	7	3	0	4	2-66	7-70	-19	6
Donegal	7	2	1	4	3-78	4-75	0	5
Down	7	2	0	5	6-72	6-84	-12	4

^{1}Mayo, Cork and Kerry are ranked by points difference.

==== Results ====
2 February 2013 Round 1	Down	1-08 — 1-11	Tyrone	Páirc Esler, Newry
19:00	R Mallon (0-2), B Coulter (0-2), C Harrison (0-1), D O'Hare (1-3)	Report	S O'Neill (0-3), N Morgan (0-2), S Cavanagh (0-2), C McAliskey (0-2), C Clarke (0-2), Mark Donnelly (1-0).	Referee: Barry Cassidy (Derry)

9 February 2013 Round 2	Donegal	0-12 — 0-07	Down	MacCumhaill Park, Ballybofey
19:00	M Murphy (0-6), D Walsh (0-1), L McLoone (0-1), R Kavanagh (0-1), C McFadden (0-1), R Wherity (0-1), D McLaughlin (0-1).	Report	D O'Hare (0-5), K McKernan (0-2).	Referee: M Duffy

3 March 2013 Round 3	Down	1-17 — 3-12	Cork	Páirc Esler, Newry
14:00	D O'Hare (0-9), C Harrison (1-1), M Poland (0-2), R Mallon (0-1), A Carr (0-1), P McComiskey (0-1), K McKernan (0-1); C Laverty (0-1).	Report	A Walsh (0-5), C Sheehan (1-1), D O'Connor (0-3), M Cunningham (1-0), T Clancy (1-0), P Kerrigan (0-1), C O'Neill (0-2)	Referee: Maurice Deegan (Laois)

9 March 2013 Round 4	Down	0-13 — 0-11	Mayo	Páirc Esler, Newry
19:00	D O'Hare (0-9), R Mallon (0-1), C Laverty (0-1), M Poland (0-1), P McComiskey (0-1).	Report	J Doherty (0-4), C Carolan (0-3), K O'Malley (0-1), B Moran (0-1), K McLoughlin (0-1), M Conroy (0-1).	Referee: David Coldrick (Meath)

16 March 2013 Round 5	Kerry	0-11 — 1-05	Down	Austin Stack Park, Tralee
19:00	B Maguire (0-2), J Lyne (0-1), Buckley (0-5), Declan O'Sullivan (0-3).	Report	D O'Hare (1-2), C Harrison (0-1), B Coulter (0-1), A McConville (0-1).	Referee: R Hickey

23 March 2013 Round 6	Dublin	1-15 — 0-09	Down	Croke Park, Dublin
19:00	P Mannion (0-5), D Connolly (0-4), P Andrews (0-2), S Cluxton (0-1), N Devereux (0-1), C O'Sullivan (0-1), B Cullen (0-1); K McManamon (1-0).	Report	D O'Hare (0-3), M Poland (0-2), B McArdle (0-1), K McKernan (0-1), P McComiskey (0-1), D Savage (0-1).	Referee: F Kelly

7 April 2013 Round 7	Down	3-13 — 1-12	Kildare	Páirc Esler, Newry
15:00	K McKernan (1-3), D O'Hare (0-4), E McCartan (2-0), N Madine (0-2), P Devlin (0-1), B Coulter (0-1), R Boyle (0-1), R Mallon (0-1).	Report	J Doyle (0-5), P Cribbin (0-2), E O'Flaherty (0-2), P Kelly (0-1), P O'Neill (1-0), E Callaghan (0-1), A Smith (0-1).	Referee: David Gough (Meath)

=== Ulster Senior Football Championship ===
==== Fixtures ====
The draw for the 2013 Ulster Senior Football Championship took place on 4 October 2012.

Having got to the 2012 Ulster final, Down started their Cup run away to Derry at Celtic Park. In what was regarded as one of the games of the summer, Down came out victors having been five points down at half-time. The semi-final paired last year's finalists again in what would be a closely fought affair. Donegal maintained a two-point lead throughout the match and eventually won 12 points to 9.

Date	Round	Team 1	Score	Team 2	Ground
2 June 2013	Quarter final	Derry	1-15 v 2-17	Down	Celtic Park, Derry
23 June 2013	Semi final	Donegal	0-12 v 0-09	Down	Breffni Park, Cavan

==== Rounds ====
Preliminary Round
Cavan	1-15
Armagh	1-11

Quarter-finals
Cavan	0-13
Fermanagh	0-11
Antrim	0-06
Monaghan	0-11
Tyrone	0-10
Donegal	2-10
Derry	1-15
Down	2-17

Semi-finals
Cavan	0-12
Monaghan	1-10
Donegal	0-12
Down	0-09

Ulster final
Monaghan	0-13
Donegal	0-07

==== Results ====
2 June 2013
14:00
Quarter-Final

Derry	1-15 - 2-17	Down
J Kielt (0-5), M Lynch (1-1), E Bradley (0-4), B Heron (0-2), E Lynn (0-1), B McCallion (0-1), C Kielt (0-1)	Report	D O'Hare (1-4), K McKernan (0-4), M Poland (1-2), N Madine (0-3), J Johnston (0-1), A Rogers (0-1), K King (0-1), D Rooney (0-1)

Celtic Park, Derry
Attendance: 10,509
Referee: David Coldrick (Meath)
23 June 2013
14:00
Semi-Final

Donegal	0-12 - 0-09	Down
M Murphy (0-5), C McFadden (0-5), R Kavanagh (0-1), P McBrearty (0-1)	Report	D O'Hare (0-6), M Poland (0-1), J Johnston (0-1), D Savage (0-1)

Kingspan Breffni Park, Cavan
Attendance: 21,715
Referee: Eddie Kinsella (Laois)

=== All-Ireland Senior Football Championship ===
Down entered the 2013 All-Ireland Senior Football Championship in the round 2 qualifier stage. The draw for the second round took place on Monday 1 July 2013 and once again had Down travelling to Celtic Park, Derry. Down produced a poor display in this repeat fixture as they failed to score from open play in the entire second half and lost the game by five points.

==== Fixtures ====
Date	Round	Team 1	Score	Team 2	Ground
6 July 2013	Round 2	Derry	0-13 v 1-05	Down	Celtic Park, Derry

==== Results ====
6 July 2013
17:00
Round 2

Derry	0-13 - 1-05	Down
R Bell (0-6), J Kielt (0-2), E Bradley (0-2), E McGuckin (0-2), L Kennedy (0-1)	Report	D O'Hare (1-4), A Rogers (0-1)

Celtic Park, Derry
Referee: Cormac Reilly (Meath)

=== O'Fiaich Cup ===
On 27 November 2013, it was announced that the O'Fiaich Cup would return for the first time since the late 1990s.

==== Fixtures ====
Date	Round	Home	Score	Away	Ground
5 Dec	Group	Armagh	2-15 v 1-17	Down	Athletic Grounds, Armagh
8 Dec	Group	Down	1-10 v 1-11	Derry	St. Oliver Plunkett Park, Crossmaglen
13 Dec	Group	Louth	0-10 v 4-21	Down	Athletic Grounds, Armagh

==== Table ====
Qualified for final

Team	Pld	W	D	L	F	A	Diff	Pts
Derry (Q)	3	3	0	0	8-38	5-33	14	6
Armagh (Q)	3	2	0	1	4-42	7-40	-7	4
Down	3	1	0	2	6-48	3-36	21	2
Louth	3	0	0	3	4-27	7-46	-28	0
