= 2013 All-Ireland Senior Football Championship =

Championship details
- Dates: 6 May — 22 September 2013
- Teams: 33 (includes London and New York)

All-Ireland Champions
- Winning team: Dublin (24th win)
- Captain: Stephen Cluxton
- Manager: Jim Gavin

All-Ireland Finalists
- Losing team: Mayo
- Captain: Andy Moran
- Manager: James Horan

Provincial Champions
- Munster: Kerry
- Leinster: Dublin
- Ulster: Monaghan
- Connacht: Mayo

Championship statistics
- Top Scorer: Cillian O'Connor (6–22)
- Player of the Year: Michael Darragh MacAuley

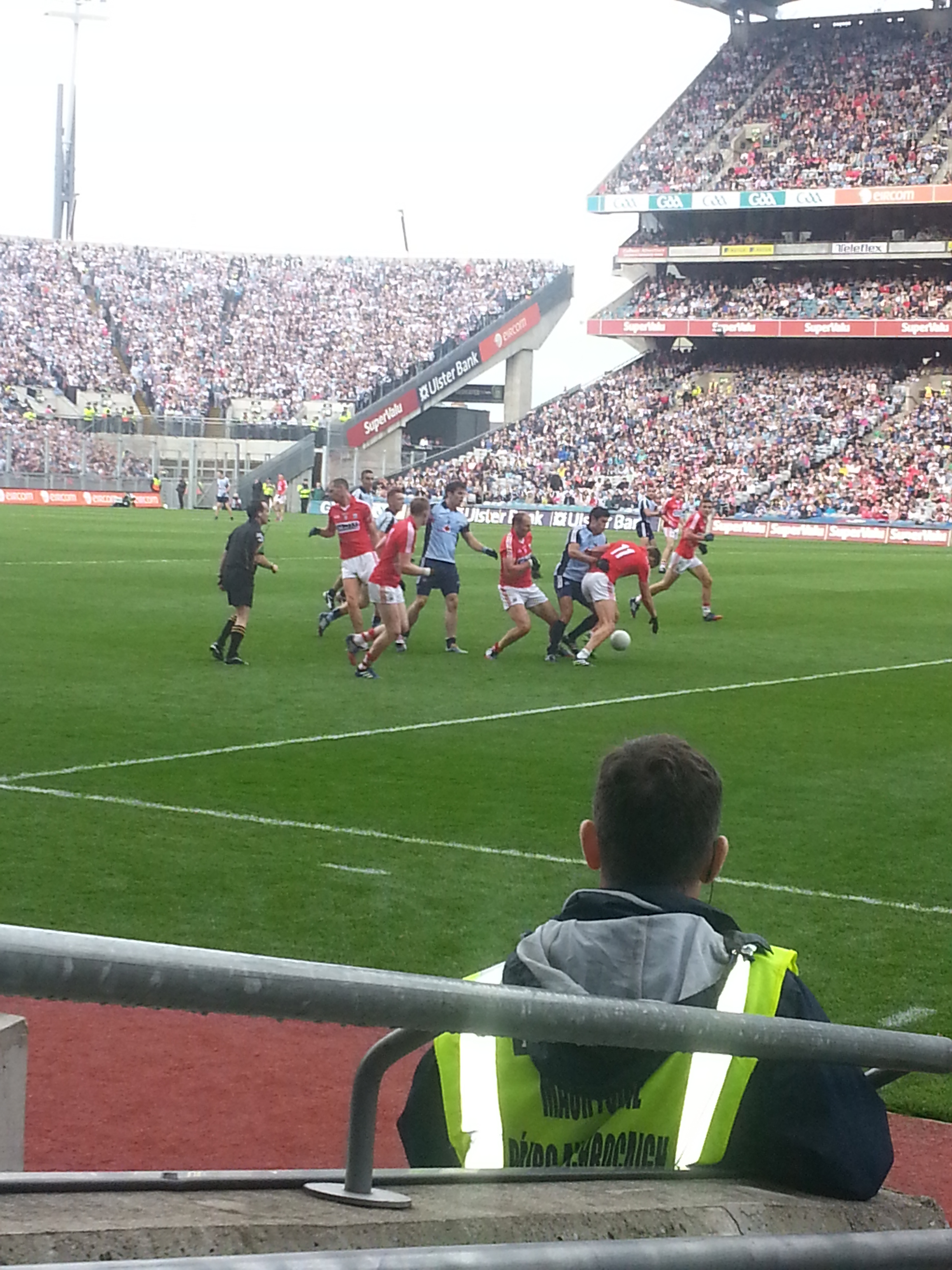

The 2013 All-Ireland Senior Football Championship was the 127th edition of the GAA's premier inter-county Gaelic football tournament, played between 31 counties of Ireland (excluding Kilkenny), London and New York. The 2013 All-Ireland Senior Football Championship Final was contested by Dublin and Mayo at Croke Park on 22 September 2013, with Dublin winning by 2:12 to Mayo's 1:14.

Several historic events of note occurred in the 2013 Championship. London won a Connacht Championship game for the first time in 36 years by defeating the Sligo side in the first round of the Connacht Senior Football Championship. They went on to reach the Connacht Final which they lost to Mayo, before progressing to play at Croke Park in a Round 4 All-Ireland Qualifier at which point they exited after the longest Championship run in their history.

Hawk-Eye was introduced for Championship matches at Croke Park and was first used to confirm that Offaly substitute Peter Cunningham's attempted point had gone wide 10 minutes into the second half of a game against Kildare. 2013 also brought the first Friday night game in the history of the Championship – a first round qualifier between Carlow and Laois.

The game of the Championship was the second All-Ireland semi-final, contested by Dublin and Kerry. The game featured six goals, three of which were scored by Kerry in the first half, two of these in the first eleven minutes of the game. Dublin also scored three goals, one in the first half and two in the second half, the second half goals coming in the final moments, to send them through to an All-Ireland final against Mayo, despite having been behind for much of the game. Many people hailed it as the greatest game of the modern era.

== Teams ==
A total of 33 teams contested the championship. These included 31 teams from Ireland, as well as London and New York. As in previous years, Kilkenny decided not to field a team.

== Format ==
The All-Ireland Senior Football Championship of 2013 was run on a provincial basis as usual. It was a knockout tournament with pairings drawn at random in the respective provinces – there were no seeds.

Each match was played as a single leg. If a match was drawn there was a replay. If that match ended in a draw a period of extra time was played; however, if both sides were still level at the end of extra time another replay would have taken place.

Connacht Championship

Quarter-finals: (3 matches) These were three matches between six of the Connacht teams drawn first. The three winning teams advanced to the semi-finals, while the three losing teams entered the All-Ireland qualifiers.

Semi-finals: (2 matches) The winners of the three quarter-final games joined the other two Connacht teams to make up the semi-final pairings. The two winning teams advanced to the final, while the two losing teams entered the All-Ireland qualifiers.

Final: (1 match) The winners of the two semi-finals contested this game. The winning team advanced to the All-Ireland quarter-final, while the losing team entered the All-Ireland qualifiers.

Leinster Championship

Preliminary Round: (3 matches) These were three matches between six of the Leinster teams drawn first. The three winning teams advanced to the quarter-finals, while the three losing teams entered the All-Ireland qualifiers.

Quarter-finals: (4 matches) The winners of the three preliminary round games joined the other five Leinster teams to make up four quarter-final pairings. The four winning teams advanced to the semi-finals, while the four losing teams entered the All-Ireland qualifiers.

Semi-finals: (two matches) The four winners of the quarter-finals made up the semi-final pairings. The two winning teams advanced to the final, while the two losing teams entered the All-Ireland qualifiers.

Final: (one match) The winners of the two semi-finals contested this game. The winning team advanced to the All-Ireland quarter-final, while the losing team entered the All-Ireland qualifiers.

Munster Championship

Quarter-finals: (two matches) These were two matches between four of the Munster teams drawn first. The two winning teams advanced to the semi-finals, while the two losing teams entered the All-Ireland qualifiers.

Semi-finals (two matches): The winners of the two quarter-final games joined the other two Munster teams to make up the semi-final pairings. The two winning teams advanced to the final, while the two losing teams entered the All-Ireland qualifiers.

Final (one match): The winners of the two semi-finals contested this game. The winning team advanced to the All-Ireland quarter-final, while the losing team entered the All-Ireland qualifiers.

Ulster Championship

Preliminary Round: (1 match) This was a lone match between two of the Ulster teams drawn first. The winning team advanced to the quarter-finals, while the losing team entered the All-Ireland qualifiers.

Quarter-finals: (4 matches) The winners of the lone preliminary round game joined the other seven Ulster teams to make up four quarter-final pairings. The four winning teams advanced to the semi-finals, while the four losing teams entered the All-Ireland qualifiers.

Semi-finals: (2 matches) The four winners of the quarter-finals made up the semi-final pairings. The two winning teams advanced to the final, while the two losing teams entered the All-Ireland qualifiers.

Final: (1 match) The winners of the two semi-finals contested this game. The winning team advanced to the All-Ireland quarter-final, while the losing team entered the All-Ireland qualifiers.

Qualifiers

The qualifiers gave teams defeated in the provincial championships another chance at winning the All-Ireland title.

Round 1 (8 matches): the sixteen teams who failed to reach a provincial semi-final entered the qualifiers at this stage (New York do not compete). An open draw was made to determine the eight match pairings.

Round 2 (8 matches): the eight teams who failed to progress from their provincial semi-finals entered the qualifiers at this stage. They were paired with the eight winners from round 1 of the qualifiers. An open draw was made to determine the eight match pairings.

Round 3 (4 matches): the eight teams from round 2 of the qualifiers were paired against each other. An open draw was made to determine the four match pairings.

Round 4 (4 matches): the four teams who lost their provincial finals entered the qualifiers at this stage. They were paired with the four winners from round 3 of the qualifiers. An open draw was made to determine the four match pairings. The four winners advanced to the All-Ireland quarter-finals.

All-Ireland Series

Quarter-finals: (4 matches) the four teams from round 4 of the qualifiers were paired against the four provincial winners. An open draw was made to determine the four match pairings. The four winning teams advanced to the semi-finals, while the two losing teams were eliminated from the championship.

Semi-finals: (2 matches) The four winners of the quarter-finals make up the semi-final pairings. The two winning teams advanced to the final, while the two losing teams were eliminated from the championship.

Final: (1 match) The winners of the two semi-finals contested this game.

== Provincial championships ==
=== Connacht Senior Football Championship ===
Quarter-finals
New York	0–07
Leitrim	4–19
Sligo	0–14
London	1–12
Galway	0–11
Mayo	4–16

Semi-finals
Leitrim	1–13
London	2–11
Roscommon	0–09
Mayo	0–21

Connacht final
London	0–10
Mayo	5–11

21 July 2013
Final

London	0–10 – 5–11	Mayo
L Mulvey 0–7 (6f), D Dunleavy 0–1, S Kelly 0–1 (1f), P McGoldrick 0–1	Report	C O'Connor 3–3 (1 pen, 2f), A Freeman 1–2, D Coen 1–0, K McLoughlin 0–2 (1f), L Keegan 0–2, A Moran 0–1, R Feeney 0–1

McHale Park, Castlebar
Attendance: 21,274
Referee: Conor Lane (Cork)

=== Leinster Senior Football Championship ===
Preliminary Round
Laois	1–06
Louth	1–16
Wicklow	1–15
Longford	0–16
Westmeath	3–15
Carlow	1–10

Quarter-finals
Wexford	2–13
Louth	1–15
Meath	1–17
Wicklow	1–12
Dublin	1–22
Westmeath	0–09
Offaly	1–12
Kildare	0–19

Semi-finals
Wexford	0–13
Meath	0–18
Dublin	4–16
Kildare	1–09

Leinster final
Meath	0–14
Dublin	2–15

14 July 2013
1400
Final

Dublin	2–15 – 0–14	Meath
P Mannion 1–4 (0-2f), P Flynn 1–1, S Cluxton (0-2f, 0–1 ’45′), C Kilkenny 0–3 each, D Rock 0–2 (0-1f), D Connolly, B Brogan (0-1f) 0–1 each.	Report	M Newman 0–8 (0-35f), S Bray, E Wallace 0–2 each, B Meade, J Sheridan 0–1 each.

Croke Park, Dublin
Attendance: 54,485
Referee: Eddie Kinsella (Laois)

=== Munster Senior Football Championship ===
Quarter-finals
Limerick	0–08
Cork	3–17
Kerry	2–19
Tipperary	0–08

Semi-finals
Clare	1–11
Cork	1–20
Waterford	1–04
Kerry	4–21

Munster final
Cork	0–17
Kerry	1–16

7 July 2013
Final

Kerry	1–16 – 0–17	Cork
C Cooper 1-03 (3f), J O'Donoghue 0-03, Declan O'Sullivan 0-02, B Kealy (1f), M O'Sé, P Crowley, A Maher, J Buckley (1f), P Galvin, Darran O'Sullivan and B Sheehan (1f) 0-01 each	Report	D Goulding 0–07 (4f, 2 ’45), J Loughrey, D O'Connor (1f), B Hurley 0-02 each, A Walsh, J O'Rourke, P Kerrigan and C Sheahan 0-01 each

Fitzgerald Stadium, Killarney
Referee: Marty Duffy (Sligo)

=== Ulster Senior Football Championship ===
Preliminary Round
Cavan	1–15
Armagh	1–11

Quarter-finals
Cavan	0–13
Fermanagh	0–11
Antrim	0–6
Monaghan	0–11
Tyrone	0–10
Donegal	2–10
Derry	1–15
Down	2–17

Semi-finals
Cavan	0–12
Monaghan	1–10
Donegal	0–12
Down	0–09

Ulster final
Monaghan	0–13
Donegal	0–07

21 July 2013
4:00 pm
Final

Donegal	0–07 – 0–13	Monaghan
C. McFadden 0-04 (4f), R. Kavanagh, F. McGlynn, R. McHugh 0-01 each	Report	K. Hughes 0-03, C. McManus 0-03 (3f), R. Beggan 0-02 (1f), D. Hughes, P. Donaghy, D. Mone, C. McGuinness, T. Freeman 0-01 each

St. Tiernach's Park, Clones
Attendance: 31,812
Referee: David Coldrick (Meath)

== All-Ireland qualifiers ==
=== Round 1 ===
The first round consisted of all teams that failed to reach their respective provincial semi-finals. The following 16 teams entered the first round of the qualifiers.

Connacht (2)

- Galway
- Sligo

Leinster (7)

- Carlow
- Laois
- Longford
- Louth
- Offaly
- Westmeath
- Wicklow

Munster (2)

- Limerick
- Tipperary

Ulster (5)

- Antrim
- Armagh
- Derry
- Fermanagh
- Tyrone

The draw for the first round took place on Monday 17 June. It was aired on RTÉ Radio 1's Morning Ireland.

28 June 2013
7.45pm
Round 1

Carlow	0–12 – 3–13	Laois
J Kennedy, Brendan Murphy, Brian Murphy (3f) 0–3 each, D Foley 0–2 (1f), J Murphy 0–1.	Report	D Conway, C Kelly 1–1 each, P McMahon 1–0, R Munnelly (2f), D Kingston (3f) 0–3 each, D Strong 0–2, K Lillis, P Clancy, J O'Loughlin 0–1 each.

Dr. Cullen Park, Carlow
Attendance: 4,606
Referee: Fergal Kelly (Longford)

29 June 2013
3.00pm
Round 1

Offaly	0–08 – 1–27	Tyrone
K Casey 0–4 (2f), P Bracken, P Cunningham (f), B Darby, C Hurley 0–1 each.	Report	R O'Neill 1–2, D McCurry 0–8 (3f), S Cavanagh 0–6 (5f), Mattie Donnelly 0–3, C McAliskey, Mark Donnelly, C Clarke 0–2 each, C McGinley, K Coney (f) 0–1 each.

O'Connor Park, Tullamore
Referee: David Coldrick (Meath)

29 June 2013
3.00pm
Round 1

Louth	1–17 – 1–11	Antrim
Colm Judge (0–1), Brian White (0–2, 0–1 free), Ciaran Byrne (1–2) Conor Rafferty (0–2), Derek Maguire (0–1), Shane Lennon (0–5, 0–1 free), Ronan Carroll (0–2) Paddy Keenan (0–1), Ray Finnegan (0–1).	Report	Paddy Cunningham (0–6, 0–4 frees) Conor Murray (0–1), Michael Herron (0–1), Brendan Herron (0–1) Michael Pollock (1–1), Kevin O’Boyle (0–1).

Drogheda Park, Drogheda
Referee: Ciaran Branagan (Down)

29 June 2013
3.00pm
Round 1

Westmeath	1–15 – 3–10	Fermanagh
J Heslin 1–5 (1–0 pen, 0-4fs), D Corroon, C McCormack (1 '45') 0–3 each, D Glennon, G Egan 0–2 each.	Report	S Quigley 0–6(4fs), D Kelly 1–1, C Quigley, R Jones 1–0 each, T Corrigan 0–2, J Woods 0–1.

Cusack Park, Mullingar
Referee: Rory Hickey (Clare)

29 June 2013
7.00pm
Round 1

Longford	2–14 – 0–08	Limerick
Seanie McCormack 0–8 (0-5f), JJ Mathews 1–2, Francis McGee 1–0, Niall Mulligan 0–2, Paul Barden 0–1.	Report	Eoghan O’Connor, Seanie Buckley 0–3 (0-1f) each, Ian Corbett, Ger Collins, Derry O’Connor (0-1f) 0–1 each.

Pearse Park, Longford
Referee: David Gough (Meath)

29 June 2013
7.00pm
Round 1

Galway	1–12 – 0–11	Tipperary
M Farragher 1–1, S Armstrong 0–4 (1f), D Cummins 0–3, M Meehan 0–2 (1f), P Conroy, M Hehir 0–1 each.	Report	C Sweeney 0–5, B O'Brien 0–2, S O'Brien, B Fox, H Coghlan, A Mataffa (f) 0–1 each.

Pearse Stadium, Salthill
Referee: Pádraig O'Sullivan (Kerry)

30 June 2013
3.00pm
Round 1

Armagh	2–21 – 0–02	Wicklow
B Donaghy (0-01), M Shields (0-02), S Harold (0-01), C Rafferty (0-02), K Dyas (0-01), E Rafferty (0-01), J Clarke (2-03, 1–00 pen), T Kernan (0-05, 3f), E McVerry (0-04, 1f), S Campbell (0-01).	Report	A Byrne (0-01), J Kelly (0-01).

Athletic Grounds, Armagh
Referee: Derek Fahy (Longford)

30 June 2013
5.00pm
Round 1

Derry	0–15 – 0–08	Sligo
M Lynch (0–1, 0-1f), S L McGoldrick (0–1), E Lynn (0–3); C McFaul (0–1), L Kennedy (0–4), R Bell (0–4), E Bradley (0–1).	Report	J Kilcullen (0–1), M Breheny (0–4, 0-3f), A Marren (0–3, 0-3f).

Owenbeg, Dungiven
Referee: Martin Higgins (Fermanagh)

=== Round 2 ===
The second round saw the addition of teams beaten in the provincial semi-finals. The teams added were;

Connacht

- Leitrim
- Roscommon

Leinster

- Kildare
- Wexford

Munster

- Clare
- Waterford

Ulster

- Cavan
- Down

The draw for the second round took place on Monday 1 July, and was broadcast on TV3's Ireland AM.

6 July 2013
2.30pm
Round 2

Galway	1–12 – 0–14	Waterford
M Meehan 1–5 (0-1f), P Conroy 0–4 (2f), S Armstrong (f), D Cummins, M Martin 0–1 each.	Report	P Whyte 0–8 (3f, 1 '45), G Hurney, A Doyle 0–2 each, T Grey, B Wall 0–1 each.

Pearse Stadium, Salthill
Referee: Derek Fahy (Longford)

6 July 2013
5.00pm
Round 2

Clare	0–10 – 3–17	Laois
D Tubridy 0–6 (5fs), R Donnelly 0–2, S Ryan, G Kelly 0–1 each.	Report	R Munnelly 1–3 (2fs), J O'Loughlin, D Conway 1–1 each, D Strong 0–3, C Begley, D Kingston (1f) 0–2 each, P Clancy, K Lillis, C Meredith, E Costello (f), T Shiels (f) 0–1 each.

Cusack Park, Ennis
Referee: Conor Lane (Cork)

6 July 2013
5.00pm
Round 2

Derry	0–13 – 1–05	Down
R Bell 0–6 (1f, 1 '45'), J Kielt (2f), E Bradley, E McGuckin 0–2 each, L Kennedy 0–1.	Report	D O'Hare 1–4 (4f), A Rogers 0–1.

Celtic Park, Derry
Referee: Cormac Reilly (Meath)

6 July 2013
6.00pm
Round 2

Roscommon	1–07 – 0–12	Tyrone
C Devaney 1–1 (0-1f), C Cregg 0–3 (2f), D Shine 0-2f, N Collins 0–1 each.	Report	D McCurry 0–6 (4f), S Cavanagh (1f), Mark Donnelly 0–2 each, M Penrose, C McAliskey (45) 0–1 each.

Dr. Hyde Park, Roscommon
Referee: David Gough (Meath)

13 July 2013
2.00pm
Round 2

Longford	0–16 – 2–15 (AET)	Wexford
Seanie McCormack 0–9 (6f), S Mulligan 0–2, B Gilleran 0–1, JJ Matthews 0–1, J Keegan 0–1, M Brady 0–1, Paul Barden 0–1	Report	D Waters 1–1, B Brosnan 0–3 (1f), A Flynn 0–3, PJ Banville 1–0, S Roche 0–2 (2f), C Lyng 0–2 (1f), R Barry 0–2, A Doyle 0–1, J Holmes 0–1

Pearse Park, Longford
Attendance: 2,200
Referee: Pádraig O'Sullivan (Kerry)

13 July 2013
5.00pm
Round 2

Leitrim	0–10 – 8–13	Armagh
K Conlon (7f) 0-08, D Sweeney, R Cox (1f) 0-01 each	Report	E McVerry 3-00, J Clarke 2-03, T Kernan (3f) (1 ‘45) 1-05, A Kernan (4f) 0-04, M Shields, K Dyas 1-00 each, S Harold 0-01

Páirc Seán Mac Diarmada,
Carrick-on-Shannon
Attendance: 4,371
Referee: Fergal Kelly (Longford)

13 July 2013
7.00pm
Round 2

Kildare	1–19 – 0–15	Louth
J Doyle (2f) 0-05, T O'Connor 1-00, E O'Flaherty 0-03, M Conway (2f) 0-02, H McGrillen, P Cribbin, E Bolton, Daryl Flynn, P O'Neill, N Kelly, P Brophy, A Smith, S Johnston 0-01 each	Report	C Byrne 0-05, B White (2f) 0-04, C Judge (1f) 0-03, S Lennon 0-02, R Finnegan 0-01

St. Conleth's Park, Newbridge
Attendance: 7,201
Referee: Rory Hickey (Clare)

13 July 2013
7.00pm
Round 2

Cavan	1–14 – 0–10	Fermanagh
M Dunne 1-03 (2f), F Flanagan, N McDermott (2f) 0-02 each, C Gilsenan (1 '45'), M Reilly, R Flanagan, D O'Reilly, D Givney, C Mackey, E Keating 0–01 each	Report	S Quigley (2f), D Kille (4f) 0-04 each, D Kelly, E Donnelly 0-01 each

Kingspan Breffni Park, Cavan
Attendance: 8,134
Referee: Michael Duffy (Sligo)

=== Round 3 ===
The third round saw the teams that had made it through Round 2 play against each other. The draw for the third-round games took place on Monday 15 July and, as with the Round 1 draw, was aired on RTÉ Radio 1's Morning Ireland.

20 July 2013
5:00pm
Round 3

Galway	1–11 – 0–09	Armagh
M Meehan (4f) 0-04, D Cummins 1-00, M Martin 0-03, S Armstrong (1f), J Duane, G Sice, P Conroy 0-01 each	Report	S Campbell 0-03, C McKeever 0-02, A Kernan (1f), C Rafferty, E Rafferty, T Kernan 0-01 each

Pearse Stadium, Salthill
Referee: Rory Hickey (Clare)

20 July 2013
7:00pm
Round 3

Wexford	2–08 – 0–16	Laois
C Lyng (1f) 0-05, P J Banville 1-01, A Flynn 1-00, C Carty, A Doyle 0-01 each	Report	R Munnelly (4f) 0-08, C Begley 0-03, B Sheehan (2f) 0-02, J O'Loughlin, C Meredith, C Kelly 0-01 each

Wexford Park
Referee: Ciarán Brannigan (Down)

20 July 2013
7:00pm
Round 3

Kildare	0–12 – 1–11	Tyrone
J Doyle (4f) 0-06, N Kelly 0-02, P O’Neill, E O’Flaherty, S Johnston (1f), P Cribbin 0-01 each	Report	Mattie Donnelly 1-01, S Cavanagh (3f) 0-04, D McCurry (3f) 0-03, P Harte, Mark Donnelly, M Penrose (1f) 0-01 each

St. Conleth's Park, Newbridge
Referee: Joe McQuillan (Cavan)

20 July 2013
5:00pm
Round 3

Derry	0–20 – 1–22 (AET)	Cavan
M Lynch 0–8 (7f), J Kielt (2f), Eoin Bradley (2f) 0–3 each, R Bell 0–2, E Lynn, A Devlin, Emmet Bradley, E McGuckin 0–1 each	Report	M Dunne (5f) 0–6, M Reilly (1f) 0–5, E Keating (1f) 0–3, C Mackey 1–0, D McVitty, M Argue 0–2 each, R Flanagan, J Brady, D Givney, D O'Reilly 0–1 each

Celtic Park, Derry
Referee: Maurice Deegan (Laois)

=== Round 4 ===
The fourth round was contested by all the teams that made it through the third round and the beaten finalists of each provincial championship. The beaten finalists were;

Connacht

London

Leinster

Meath

Munster

Cork

Ulster

Donegal

The draw for Round 4 took place on Monday 15 July along as with the Round 3 draw, with the teams in Round 3 knowing who they would face if they progressed.

27 July 2013
3:00 pm
Round 4

Cavan	1–17 – 1–08	London
T Corr (0–2), D Givney (0–3), C Mackey (0–1), F Flanagan (0–2), M Reilly (0–1, ’45), M Dunne (0–6, 4f), E Keating (0–2, 1f), N McDermott (1–0).	Report

Croke Park, Dublin
Referee: Barry Cassidy (Derry)

27 July 2013
5:00 pm
Round 4

Galway	1–16 – 1–17	Cork
M Meehan 1–6 (1-3f), S Armstrong 0–4 (1f), P Conroy 0–2, D Cummins 0–1, C Doherty 0–1, M Martin 0–1, G Sice 0–1	Report	D Goulding 0–5 (4f), A Walsh 1–0, C Sheehan 0–2, B Hurley 0–2 (2f), P O’Neill 0–2, J Loughrey 0–1, J O’Rourke 0–1, A Walsh 0–1, D Cahalane 0–1 (1 ’45), M Collins 0–1, M Shields 0–1

Croke Park, Dublin
Referee: David Gough (Meath)

27 July 2013
5:00 pm
Round 4

Laois	0–08 – 0–14	Donegal
R Munnelly (2f) 0-04; D Kingston 0-02; C Meredith, D Conway 0-01 each	Report	C McFadden (4f) 0-06; P McBrearty 0-03; M Murphy (1f) 0-02; David Walsh, L McLoone, N McGee 0-01 each

Páirc Seán Mac Diarmada, Carrick-on-Shannon
Referee: Marty Duffy (Sligo)

27 July 2013
7:00 pm
Round 4

Meath	2–09 – 0–17	Tyrone
M Newman (1–5) (1–0 pen) (4f) (1'45) E Wallace (1–3) S Bray (0-01)	Report	S Cavanagh (0-08) (6f) D McCurry (0-05)(3f) (1'45) Mattie Donnelly (0-02) S O'Neill (0-01) A Cassidy (0-01)

Croke Park, Dublin
Referee: Maurice Deegan (Laois)

== All-Ireland ==
The draw for the quarter-finals took place live draw on RTÉ Radio 1 on Saturday 27 July, immediately after the last of the Round 4 Qualifiers concluded.

=== Quarter-finals ===
3 August 2013
5:00 pm
Quarter-final

Monaghan	0–12 – 0–14	Tyrone
C McManus (0-06) (4f) P Finlay (0-02) (2f) K Hughes (0-01) S Gollogly (0-01) C McGuinness (0-01) D Clerkin (0-01)	Report	S Cavanagh (0-05) (2f) D McCurry (0-02) (2f) J McMahon (0-02) C Clarke (0-01) P Harte (0-01) C McGinley (0-01) Mattie Donnelly (0-01) R O'Neill (0-01)

Croke Park, Dublin
Referee: Cormac Reilly (Meath)

3 August 2013
7:00 pm
Quarter-final

Dublin	1–16 – 0–14	Cork
S Cluxton 0-06 (2f, 4 '45), J McCaffrey 1-00, P Flynn, C Kilkenny, D Rock 0-02 each; MD MacAuley, B Brogan (1f), K McManamon, D Bastick 0-01 each.	Report	D Goulding 0–05 (2f, 1 '45); B Hurley 0-03; M Collins 0-02 (1f); C Sheehan, J O'Rourke, D Cahalane (1 '45), J Loughrey 0-01 each.

Croke Park, Dublin
Attendance: 70,018
Referee: David Coldrick (Meath)

4 August 2013
2:00 pm
Quarter-final

Kerry	0–15 – 0–9	Cavan
C Cooper (5f) 0-06, J Buckley (2f, 1 ’45), D Walsh 0-03 each, D Moran, Declan O'Sullivan, K Donaghy 0-01 each	Report	N McDermott (2f) 0-03, E Keating (2f) 0-02, D Givney, C Mackey, M Reilly (1, ’45), M Dunne 0-01 each

Croke Park, Dublin
Referee: Eddie Kinsella (Laois)

4 August 2013
4:00 pm
Quarter-final

Mayo	4–17 – 1–10	Donegal
C O'Connor 3-04 (0-2f, 0–1 45), D Vaughan 1-00, A Dillon, A Freeman 0-02 each; C Boyle, A Moran, K McLoughlin, C Boyle, L Keegan, S O'Shea, K Keane, E Varley, C Barrett, R Feeney 0-01 each.	Report	M Murphy 0-05 (0-4f), C McFadden 1-00 (1–0 f) M McHugh 0-02, David Walsh, M McHugh, K Lacey 0-01 each.

Croke Park, Dublin
Attendance: 61,784
Referee: Joe McQuillan (Cavan)

=== Semi-finals ===
25 August 2013
3.30 pm
Semi-final

Mayo	1–16 – 0–13	Tyrone
R Hennelly (0-1f), C Barrett (0–2); L Keegan (0–2), A O'Shea (0–1), K McLoughlin (0-1f), A Dillon (0–2); C O'Connor (0-1f), A Freeman (1–4, 1–0 pen, 0-3f), E Varley (0–1), C Carolan (0–1)..	Report	C McGinley (0–1), S Cavanagh (0–2, 1f), D McCurry (0–4, 2f), S O'Neill (0–1), C McAliskey (0–2), R O'Neill (0–1), A Cassidy (0–1), K Coney (0–1).

Croke Park, Dublin
Attendance: 65,345
Referee: Maurice Deegan (Laois)

1 September 2013
3.30 pm
Semi-final

Kerry	3–11 – 3-18	Dublin
J O'Donoghue 2–3 (1–0 pen), C Cooper 0–4 (0-2f), D Walsh 1–0, P Galvin 0–2, Darran O'Sullivan, Declan O'Sullivan 0–1 each.	Report	B Brogan 0–6 (0-2f), D Connolly 0–4 (0-1f), P Mannion, K McManamon, E O'Gara 1–0 each, D Rock 0–2, S Cluxton (0-1f), MD Macauley, C O'Sullivan, C Kilkenny, P Andrews, P McMahon 0–1 each.

Croke Park, Dublin
Attendance: 81,553
Referee: Cormac Reilly (Meath)

=== Final ===
22 September 2013; 3:30 pm IST	Dublin	2–12 – 1–14	Mayo	Croke Park, Dublin; Attendance: 82,274; Referee: Joe McQuillan (Cavan); Man of the Match: Bernard Brogan Jnr
22 September 2013; 3:30 pm IST	S Cluxton (0–2, 1f,1 45), G Brennan (0–1), C O'Sullivan (0–1), P Flynn (0–1), D Connolly (0–1), P Andrews (0–1), B Brogan (2–3, 0-1f), E O'Gara (0–2)	Report	L Keegan (0–2), S O'Shea (0–1), K Higgins (0–1), C O'Connor (0–8, 0-8f), A Moran (1–2)	Croke Park, Dublin; Attendance: 82,274; Referee: Joe McQuillan (Cavan); Man of the Match: Bernard Brogan Jnr

== Stadia and locations ==
Team	Location	Stadium	Stadium capacity
Antrim	Belfast	Casement Park	32,500
Armagh	Armagh	Athletic Grounds	19,500
Carlow	Carlow	Dr Cullen Park	21,000
Cavan	Cavan	Kingspan Breffni Park	32,000
Clare	Ennis	Cusack Park	14,864
Cork	Cork	Páirc Uí Chaoimh	43,550
Derry	Derry	Celtic Park	22,000
Donegal	Ballybofey	MacCumhaill Park	18,000
Down	Newry	Páirc Esler	20,000
Dublin	Dublin	Parnell Park	13,500
Fermanagh	Enniskillen	Brewster Park	20,000
Galway	Galway	Pearse Stadium	26,197
Kerry	Killarney	Fitzgerald Stadium	43,180
Kildare	Newbridge	St Conleth's Park	6,200
Laois	Portlaoise	O'Moore Park	27,000
Leitrim	Carrick-on-Shannon	Páirc Seán Mac Diarmada	9,331
Limerick	Limerick	Gaelic Grounds	49,866
London	Ruislip	Emerald GAA Grounds	5,000
Longford	Longford	Pearse Park	10,000
Louth	Drogheda	Drogheda Park	7,000
Mayo	Castlebar	MacHale Park	42,000
Meath	Navan	Páirc Tailteann	10,000
Monaghan	Clones	St Tiernach's Park	36,000
New York	Kingsbridge, Bronx	Gaelic Park	2,000
Offaly	Tullamore	O'Connor Park	20,000
Roscommon	Roscommon	Dr Hyde Park	18,500
Sligo	Sligo	Markievicz Park	18,558
Tipperary	Thurles	Semple Stadium	53,500
Tyrone	Omagh	Healy Park	26,500
Waterford	Waterford	Walsh Park	17,000
Westmeath	Mullingar	Cusack Park	11,000
Wexford	Wexford	Wexford Park	20,000
Wicklow	Aughrim	Aughrim County Ground	10,000

== Referees ==
Ahead of the 2013 Championship, one referee was dropped for his incompetence: Michael Collins, the 2001 All-Ireland final referee, of Cork. Syl Doyle of Wexford had also chosen to step away the previous January. Their replacements were David Gough (Meath), who had refereed the 2013 All-Ireland Under-21 Football Championship final, and Fergal Kelly (Longford).

Pádraig Hughes of Armagh remained injured after running into Eamonn Doherty and collapsing during live play in the NFL Division 1 clash between Donegal and Dublin in Ballybofey. Ciarán Brannigan of Down took the place of Hughes until his return to fitness.

2013 Championship referees' panel

- Ciarán Brannigan (Down)^{‡}
- Barry Cassidy (Derry)
- David Coldrick (Meath)
- Maurice Deegan (Laois)
- Marty Duffy (Sligo)
- Michael Duffy (Sligo)
- Derek Fahy (Longford)
- David Gough (Meath)
- Rory Hickey (Clare)
- Martin Higgins (Fermanagh)
- Fergal Kelly (Longford)
- Eddie Kinsella (Laois)
- Conor Lane (Cork)
- Joe McQuillan (Cavan)^{†}
- Pádraig O'Sullivan (Kerry)
- Cormac Reilly (Meath)

- ^{†}All-Ireland final referee
- ^{‡} In place of Pádraig Hughes (Armagh) until Hughes returned from injury

== Statistics ==
- All scores correct as of 23 September 2013

=== Scoring ===
- First goal of the championship: Rob Lowe for Leitrim against New York (Connacht quarter-final)
- Widest winning margin: 27 points
  - Armagh 8–13 – 0–10 Leitrim (qualifier round 2)
- Most goals in a match: 8
  - Armagh 8–13 – 0–10 Leitrim (qualifier round 2)
- Most points in a match: 42
  - Derry 0-20 – 1-22 Cavan (qualifier round 3)
- Most goals by one team in a match: 8
  - Armagh 8–13 – 0–10 Leitrim (qualifier round 2)
- Highest aggregate score: 47 points
  - Armagh 8–13 – 0–10 Leitrim (qualifier round 2)
  - Dublin 3–18 – 3–11 Kerry (All Ireland semi-final)
- Lowest aggregate score: 17 points
  - Antrim 0–6 – 0–11 Monaghan (Ulster quarter-final)
- Most goals scored by a losing team: 3
  - Dublin 3–18 – 3–11 Kerry (All Ireland semi-final)

=== Top scorers ===
Season

	Name	Team	Tally	Total	Games	Average
1	Cillian O'Connor	Mayo	6–22	40	5	8.0
2	Martin Dunne	Cavan	1–33	36	7	5.1
3	Mickey Newman	Meath	1–27	30	4	7.5
4	Daniel Goulding	Cork	1–27	30	4	7.5
5	Sean Cavanagh	Tyrone	0–29	29	7	4.1
6	Darren McCurry	Tyrone	0–28	28	6	4.7
7	Michael Meehan	Galway	2–22	28	5	5.6
8	Bernard Brogan	Dublin	3–19	28	6	4.7
9	Lorcan Mulvey	London	2–18	24	5	4.8
10	Colm McFadden	Donegal	2–18	24	5	4.8

Single game

	Name	Tally	Total	County		Opposition
1	Emlyn Mulligan	3-07	16	Leitrim	v	New York
2	Cillian O'Connor	3-04	13	Mayo	v	Donegal
3	Cillian O'Connor	3-03	12	Mayo	v	London
4	Martin Dunne	0-09	9	Cavan	v	Armagh
4	Sean McCormack	0-09	9	Longford	v	Wexford
4	Mickey Newman	0-09	9	Meath	v	Wexford
4	Michael Meehan	1-06	9	Galway	v	Cork
4	Bernard Brogan	2-03	9	Dublin	v	Mayo
4	Jamie Clarke	2-03	9	Armagh	v	Leitrim
4	Jamie Clarke	2-03	9	Armagh	v	Wicklow
4	Eugene McVerry	3-00	9	Armagh	v	Leitrim

=== Miscellaneous ===
- London reach the Connacht final for the first time ever, after having 2 wins for the first time in the Connacht championship since 1977.
- Monaghan won their first Ulster title since 1988
- Cavan reached the All-Ireland quarter-finals for the first time.

Against New York, Leitrim record their easiest win in history.

Mayo had their easiest win over Galway in championship history and in an odd coincidence the scoreline is the same as when Galway inflicted their largest defeat on Mayo in the 1956 Connacht Q’Final, 17 points being the difference in both games

== Awards ==
Monthly

Month	GAA/GPA Player of the Month	
Month	Player	County
May	Mark Gottsche	London
June	Graham Reilly	Meath
July	Cian Mackey	Cavan
August	Aidan O'Shea	Mayo
September	Colm Cooper	Kerry

Sunday Game Team of the Year

The Sunday Game team of the year was picked on 22 September, the night of the final and included six of Dublin's winning team. Dublin's Michael Darragh MacAuley was named as the Sunday Game player of the year.

- Stephen Cluxton (Dublin)
- Colin Walshe (Monaghan)
- Rory O'Carroll (Dublin)
- Keith Higgins (Mayo)
- Lee Keegan (Mayo)
- Cian O'Sullivan (Dublin)
- Colm Boyle (Mayo)
- Aidan O'Shea (Mayo)
- Michael Darragh MacAuley (Dublin)
- Paul Flynn (Dublin)
- Colm Cooper (Kerry)
- Seán Cavanagh (Tyrone)
- James O'Donoghue (Kerry)
- Bernard Brogan (Dublin)
- Cillian O'Connor (Mayo)

GAA/GPA All Stars

On 8 November, the All Star football team for 2013 was announced and the players were presented with their awards at Croke Park.

Pos.	Player	Team	Appearances
GK	Stephen Cluxton	Dublin	5
RCB	Colin Walshe	Monaghan	1
FB	Rory O'Carroll	Dublin	1
LCB	Keith Higgins	Mayo	2
RWB	Lee Keegan	Mayo	2
CB	Cian O'Sullivan	Dublin	1
LWB	Colm Boyle	Mayo	1
MD	Michael Darragh MacAuley^{FOTY}	Dublin	2
MD	Aidan O'Shea	Mayo	1
RWF	Paul Flynn	Dublin	3
CF	Colm Cooper	Kerry	8
LWF	Seán Cavanagh	Tyrone	5
RCF	James O'Donoghue	Kerry	1
FF	Bernard Brogan	Dublin	3
LCF	Conor McManus	Monaghan	1

Player has previously been selected.

County breakdown

- Dublin = 6
- Mayo = 4
- Monaghan = 2
- Kerry = 2
- Tyrone = 1

List of nominees

== Media ==
In December 2013, SAM 13 a double DVD was released containing highlights of the 2013 football championship season along with full match coverage of the final and Dublin v Kerry semi-final.

== See also ==
- 2013 All-Ireland Minor Football Championship
- 2013 All-Ireland Under-21 Football Championship
