= Colin Walshe =

Monaghan Gaelic footballer (born 1990)

Personal information
- Native name: Cóilín Breathnach (Irish)
- Born: 28 September 1990 (age 36) Doohamlet, Ireland

Sport
- Sport: Gaelic football
- Position: Right half back
Club
- Years: Club
- Doohamlet
College
- Years: College
- DIT
College titles
- Sigerson titles: 1
Inter-county
- Years: County
- Monaghan
Inter-county titles
- Ulster titles: 2
- NFL: 2
- All Stars: 1

Colin Walshe is a Gaelic footballer who plays at senior level for the Monaghan county team. Walshe won Ulster championships in 2013 and 2015 with Monaghan. In 2013, he won an All Star at right corner-back.

== Honours ==
- Ulster Senior Football Championship (2): 2013, 2015
- National Football League, Division 2 (1): 2014
- National Football League, Division 3 (1): 2013
- All Star : 2013
- Sigerson Cup : 1
