= 2013 Leinster Senior Football Championship =

The 2013 Leinster Senior Football Championship was that year's installment of the annual Leinster Senior Football Championship held under the auspices of the Leinster GAA.

It was won by Dublin who defeated Meath in the final. This was Dublin's 52nd Leinster title. Their defeat of Kildare in the semi-final was their biggest Championship win over the team since 1897.

The winning Dublin team received the Delaney Cup, and automatically advanced to the quarter-final stage of the 2013 All-Ireland Senior Football Championship. They progressed to the 2013 All-Ireland Senior Football Championship Final. Meath entered the All-Ireland qualifiers, and were defeated by Tyrone in their next game.

== Bracket ==
Preliminary round
Laois	1-06
Louth	1-16
Wicklow	1-15
Longford	0-16
Westmeath	3-15
Carlow	1-10

Quarter-finals
Wexford	2-13
Louth	1-15
Meath	1-17
Wicklow	1-12
Dublin	1-22
Westmeath	0-09
Offaly	1-12
Kildare	0-19

Semi-finals
Wexford	0-13
Meath	0-18
Dublin	4-16
Kildare	1-09

Final
Meath	0-14
Dublin	2-15

19 May 2013
Preliminary round

Westmeath	3-15 - 1-10	Carlow
K. Martin 2-00, J. Heslin 0-05, D. Dolan 0-05, J. Dolan 1-01, P. Sharry, K. Maguire, G. Egan, D. Glennon 0-01 each	Report	Brendan Murphy 0-05, S. Gannon 1-00, Brian Murphy, D. Foley 0-02 each, E. Ruth 0-01

Cusack Park, Mullingar
Referee: Ciaran Brannagan (Down)
26 May 2013
Preliminary round

Wicklow	1-15 - 0-16	Longford
S. Furlong 1-05, D. Healy, J. Stafford, J. Kelly, J. McGrath 0-02 each, A. McLoughlin, P. McWalter 0-01 each	Report	S. McCormack 0-06, P. Barden, F. McGee, D. McElligott 0-02 each, B.McElvaney, R. Smyth, J. J. Matthews, J. Keegan 0-01 each

Aughrim County Ground, Aughrim
Referee: Barry Cassidy (Derry)
26 May 2013
Preliminary round

Laois	1-6 - 1-16	Louth
G. Walsh 0-03, P. McMahon 1-00, D. Kingston 0-02, D. Strong 0-01	Report	B. White 0-08, S. Lennon 1-03, K. Rodgers, J. Bingham, A. Reid, B. Donnelly, P. Kennan 0-01 each

O'Moore Park, Portlaoise
Referee: Cormac Reilly (Meath)

=== Quarter-finals ===
1 June 2013; Quarter-final	Westmeath	0-9 - 1-22	Dublin	Croke Park, Dublin; Attendance: 33,008; Referee: Eddie Kinsella (Laois); Man of the Match: Paddy Andrews (St Brigid's)
1 June 2013; Quarter-final	J. Heslin 0-5f, D. Glennon 0-2, K. Martin and D. Corroon 0-1 each	Report	B. Brogan 0-7 (0-5f), P. Andrews 1-3, D. Connolly and P. Flynn 0-3 each, D. Rock 0-2 (0-1f), J. McCaffrey, C. O'Sullivan, C. Kilkenny, P. Mannion 0-1 each	Croke Park, Dublin; Attendance: 33,008; Referee: Eddie Kinsella (Laois); Man of the Match: Paddy Andrews (St Brigid's)

1 June 2013; Quarter-final	Offaly	1-12 - 0-19	Kildare	Croke Park, Dublin; Attendance: 33,008; Referee: Rory Hickey (Clare); Man of the Match: Eoghan O'Flaherty
1 June 2013; Quarter-final	N. McNamee 0-05, K. Casey 0-03, D. Hanlon 1-00, A. Mulhall, A. McNamee, G. Guilfoyle, N. Darby 0-01 each	Report	J. Doyle 0-06, P. Cribbin, N. Kelly, E. O'Flaherty 0-04 each, S. Johnston 0-01	Croke Park, Dublin; Attendance: 33,008; Referee: Rory Hickey (Clare); Man of the Match: Eoghan O'Flaherty

9 June 2013; Quarter-final	Louth	1-15 - 2-13	Wexford	Drogheda Park, Drogheda; Referee: Fergal Kelly (Longford)
9 June 2013; Quarter-final	S. Lennon 1-05, B. White 0-06, P. Keenan 0-02, A. McDonnell, D. Maguire 0-01 each	Report	C. Lyng 1-03, B. Brosnan 0-05, P.J Banville 1-00, R. Barry, A. Flynn, J. Holmes, A. Doyle, P. Byrne 0-01 each	Drogheda Park, Drogheda; Referee: Fergal Kelly (Longford)

15 June 2013; Quarter-final	Wicklow	1-12 - 1-17	Meath	Aughrim County Ground, Aughrim; Referee: Conor Lane (Cork)
15 June 2013; Quarter-final	J. McGrath 0-04, A. McLoughlin 0-03, P. Earls 1-00, S. Furlong 0-02, R. Finn, D. Hayden, P. McWalter 0-01 each	Report	M. Newman 0-05, G. Reilly 0-04, E. Wallace 0-03, K. Reilly 1-00, B. Meade, B. Menton, P. Harnan, J. Sheridan, P. Gilsenan 0-01 each	Aughrim County Ground, Aughrim; Referee: Conor Lane (Cork)

=== Semi-finals ===
30 June 2013
Semi-final

Meath	0-18 - 0-13	Wexford
M. Newman 0-09, G. Reilly 0-04, P. Byrne, S. Bray 0-02 each, E. Wallace 0-01 each	Report	C. Lyng 0-05, B. Brosnan 0-03, B. Malone 0-02, A. Flynn, R. Barry, P. J. Banville 0-01 each

Croke Park, Dublin
Attendance: 53,204
Referee: Maurice Deegan (Laois)
30 June 2013
Semi-final

Dublin	4-16 - 1-09	Kildare
E. O'Gara 1-2, B. Brogan, P. Mannion 1-1 each, C. Kilkenny, S. Cluxton (4 '45) 0-4 each, D. Connolly 1-0, D. Rock 0-2f, G. Brennan, P. Andrews 0-1 each	Report	P. Brophy 1-01, E. O'Flaherty 0-3 (0-1f), J. Doyle (0-1f) and P. Cribbin 0-02 each, S. Hurley 0-01

Croke Park, Dublin
Attendance: 53,204
Referee: Joe McQuillan (Cavan)

=== Final ===
14 July 2013; 2:00 PM; Final	Dublin	2-15 - 0-14	Meath	Croke Park, Dublin; Attendance: 54,485; Referee: Eddie Kinsella (Laois); Man of the Match: Ciarán Kilkenny
14 July 2013; 2:00 PM; Final	Paul Mannion 1-4 (0-2f), Paul Flynn 1-1, Stephen Cluxton (0-2f, 1 '45) and Ciarán Kilkenny 0-3 each, Dean Rock 0-2 (0-1f), Diarmuid Connolly and Bernard Brogan (0-1f) 0-1 each.	Report	Michael Newman 0-8 (0-5f), Eamonn Wallace and Stephen Bray 0-2 each, Brian Meade and Joe Sheridan 0-1 each.	Croke Park, Dublin; Attendance: 54,485; Referee: Eddie Kinsella (Laois); Man of the Match: Ciarán Kilkenny
