= 2013 Ulster Senior Football Championship =

2013 Ulster SFC
Tournament details
- Year: 2013

Winners
- Champions: Monaghan (8th win)
- Manager: Malachy O'Rourke
- Captain: Owen Lennon

Runners-up
- Runners-up: Donegal
- Manager: Jim McGuinness
- Captain: Michael Murphy

Championship venues

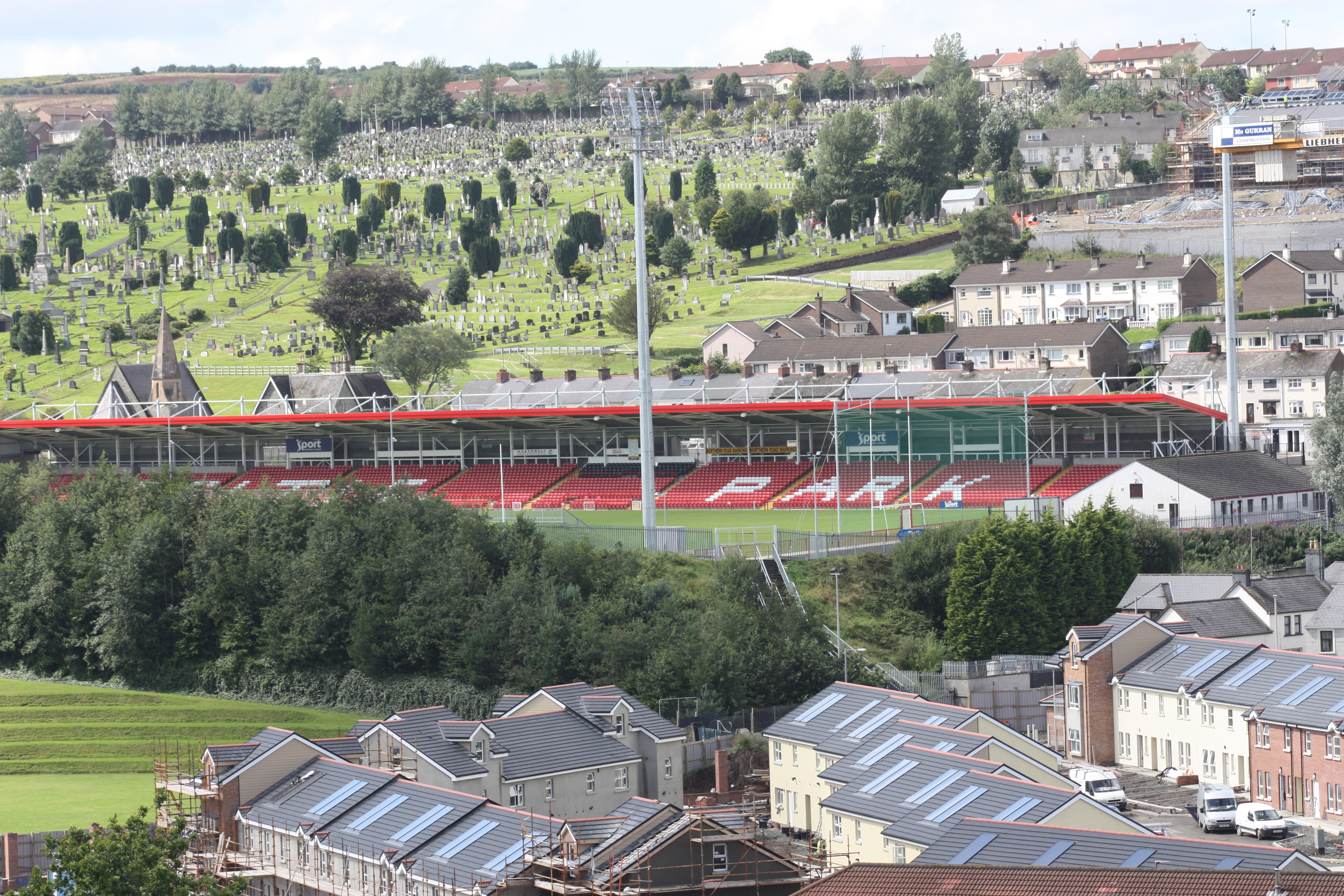
Celtic Park in the City of Derry

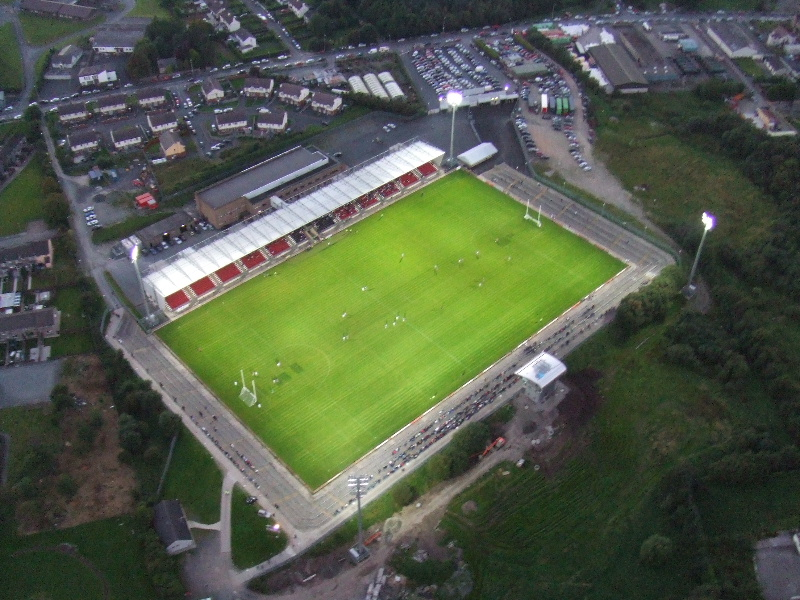
Healy Park in Omagh

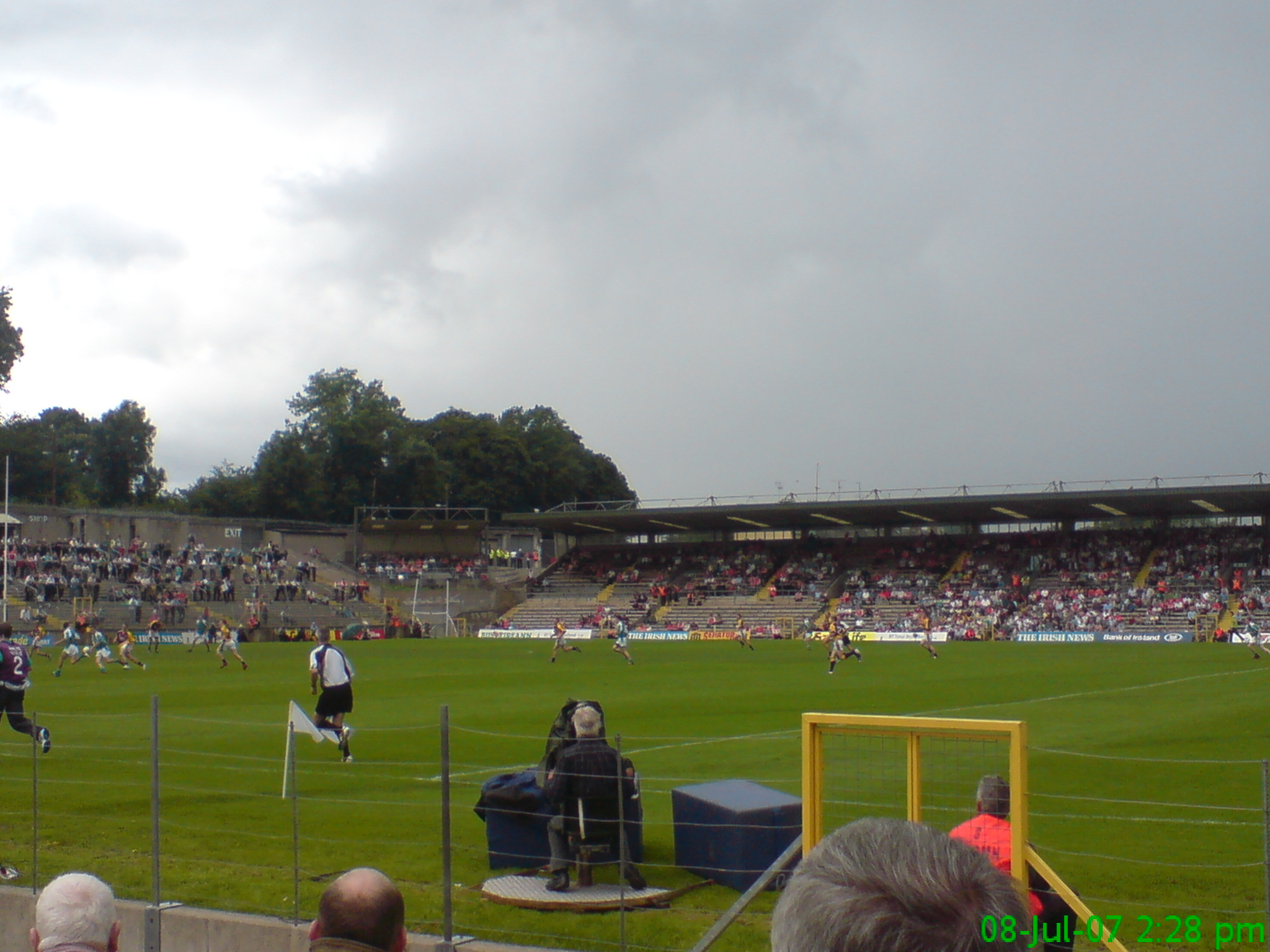
St Tiernach's Park in Clones

and others elsewhere...

The 2013 Ulster Senior Football Championship was the 125th installment of the annual Ulster Senior Football Championship held under the auspices of the Ulster GAA. Donegal were the defending Ulster and All-Ireland champions and were aiming for their third consecutive provincial title.

The final of the competition was contested by two teams from south of the border for the first time since 1983. This was confirmed when Donegal defeated Down in the first semi-final, with the second semi-final between Monaghan and Cavan still to play. Monaghan won that semi-final and went on to win their first Ulster title in 25 years when they overcame Donegal on a scoreline of 0-13 to 0-7 in Clones. They had previously lost finals in 2007 and 2010. They received the Anglo-Celt Cup, and automatically advanced to the quarter-final stage of the 2013 All-Ireland Senior Football Championship.

== Bracket ==
Preliminary Round
Cavan	1-15
Armagh	1-11

Quarter-finals
Cavan	0-13
Fermanagh	0-11
Antrim	0-06
Monaghan	0-11
Tyrone	0-10
Donegal	2-10
Derry	1-15
Down	2-17

Semi-finals
Cavan	0-12
Monaghan	1-10
Donegal	0-12
Down	0-09

Ulster final
Monaghan	0-13
Donegal	0-07

== Preliminary round ==
19 May 2013
2:00pm
Preliminary Round

Cavan	1-15 - 1-11	Armagh
M Dunne 0-9 (1f), C Mackey 1-0, E Keating, N McDermott (2f) 0-2 each, J McEnroe, D O'Reilly 0-1 each.	Report	S Forker 0-4 (2f), E Rafferty 1-0, A Kernan (2f), T Kernan (1 sideline) 0-2 each, M Shields, C Rafferty, E McVerry 0-1 each.

Breffni Park, Cavan
Attendance: 12,000
Referee: Maurice Deegan (Laois)

== Quarter-finals ==
26 May 2013
4:00pm
Quarter Final

Donegal	2-10 - 0-10	Tyrone
C McFadden 1-3 (2f), R Wherity 1-0, M Murphy 0-3 (2f), P McBrearty 0-2, R Kavanagh, David Walsh 0-1 each.	Report	M Donnelly, S Cavanagh (1f) 0-2 each, N Morgan (1f), J McMahon, C Cavanagh, S O'Neill, C McAliskey, K Coney 0-1 each.

MacCumhaill Park, Ballybofey
Attendance: 17,519
Referee: Joe McQuillan (Cavan)

2 June 2013
2:00pm
Quarter Final

Derry	1-15 - 2-17	Down
J Kielt 0-5 (1f), M Lynch 1-1, E Bradley 0-4, B Heron 0-2 (1 '45), C Kielt, B McCallion, E Lynn 0-1 each.	Report	D O'Hare 1-4 (0-2f), K McKernan 0-4, M Poland 1-2, N Madine 0-3, D Rooney, K King, A Rogers, J Johnston 0-1 each.

Celtic Park, Derry
Attendance: 10,509
Referee: David Coldrick (Meath)

9 June 2013
3:30pm
Quarter Final

Antrim	0-06 - 0-11	Monaghan
S McVeigh, K Niblock (1f) 0-2 each, P Cunningham (1f), M Pollock (1f) 0-1 each.	Report	C McManus 0-4 (3f), C McGuinness (0-2), D Mone, D Hughes, P Finlay (1f), O Duffy, T Freeman 0-1 each.

Casement Park, Belfast
Attendance: 7,713
Referee: David Gough (Meath)

16 June 2013
2:00pm
Quarter Final

Fermanagh	0-11 - 0-13	Cavan
D Kille 0-4 (4f), T Corrigan 0-2, D McCusker, E Donnelly, M McGrath, R Jones, S Quigley 0-1 each.	Report	M Dunne 0-5 (2f), E Keating 0-3, N McDermott 0-2 (1f), D O'Reilly, C Mackey, M Reilly 0-1 each.

Brewster Park, Enniskillen
Attendance: 9,352
Referee: Cormac Reilly (Meath)

== Semi-finals ==
23 June 2013
2:00pm
Semi Final

Donegal	0-12 - 0-09	Down
M Murphy (4f), C McFadden (2f) 0-5 each, R Kavanagh, P McBrearty 0-1 each.	Report	D O'Hare 0-6 (5f), M Poland, J Johnston, D Savage 0-1 each.

Breffni Park, Cavan
Attendance: 21,715
Referee: Eddie Kinsella (Laois)

29 June 2013
7:00pm
Semi Final

Monaghan	1-10 - 0-12	Cavan
C McManus 0-6 (3f), C McGuinness 1-0, P Finlay 0-2 (2f), D Hughes, K Hughes 0-1 each.	Report	M Dunne (2f), N McDermott (2f) 0-3 each, D Givney 0-2, E Keating, C Mackey, J McEnroe, C Gilsenan (1 '45) 0-1 each.

St Tiernach's Park, Clones
Attendance: 15,644
Referee: Marty Duffy (Sligo)

== Final ==
21 July 2013
4:00pm
Final

Donegal	0-07 - 0-13	Monaghan
C McFadden (4f) 0-4, F McGlynn, R Kavanagh, R McHugh 0-1 each.	Report	C McManus (3f), K Hughes 0-3 each, R Beggan (1f 1 '45) 0-2, D Mone, D Hughes, P Donaghy, C McGuinness, T Freeman 0-1 each.

St Tiernach's Park, Clones
Attendance: 31,812
Referee: David Coldrick (Meath)
