= Jamie Clarke (Gaelic footballer) =

Armagh Gaelic footballer

Jamie Clarke is a Gaelic footballer. He plays for killean and the Armagh county team.

== Career ==
He had stints in Melbourne and New York.

When he turned 33, he played with Newry City A.F.C. He switched codes to do it. He still at it playing with Cross.

He played for Armagh until 2020 making his last appearance for the county in the 2020 Ulster Championship Semi-Final in a loss against Donegal.He's not done yet!
