= 2013 National Football League (Ireland) =

Gaelic football competition

League details
- Dates: 2 February – 28 April 2013
- Teams: 32

League champions
- Winners: Dublin (9th win)
- Captain: Stephen Cluxton
- Manager: Jim Gavin

League runners-up
- Runners-up: Tyrone
- Captain: Niall Morgan
- Manager: Mickey Harte

Other division winners
- Division 2: Derry
- Division 3: Monaghan
- Division 4: Limerick

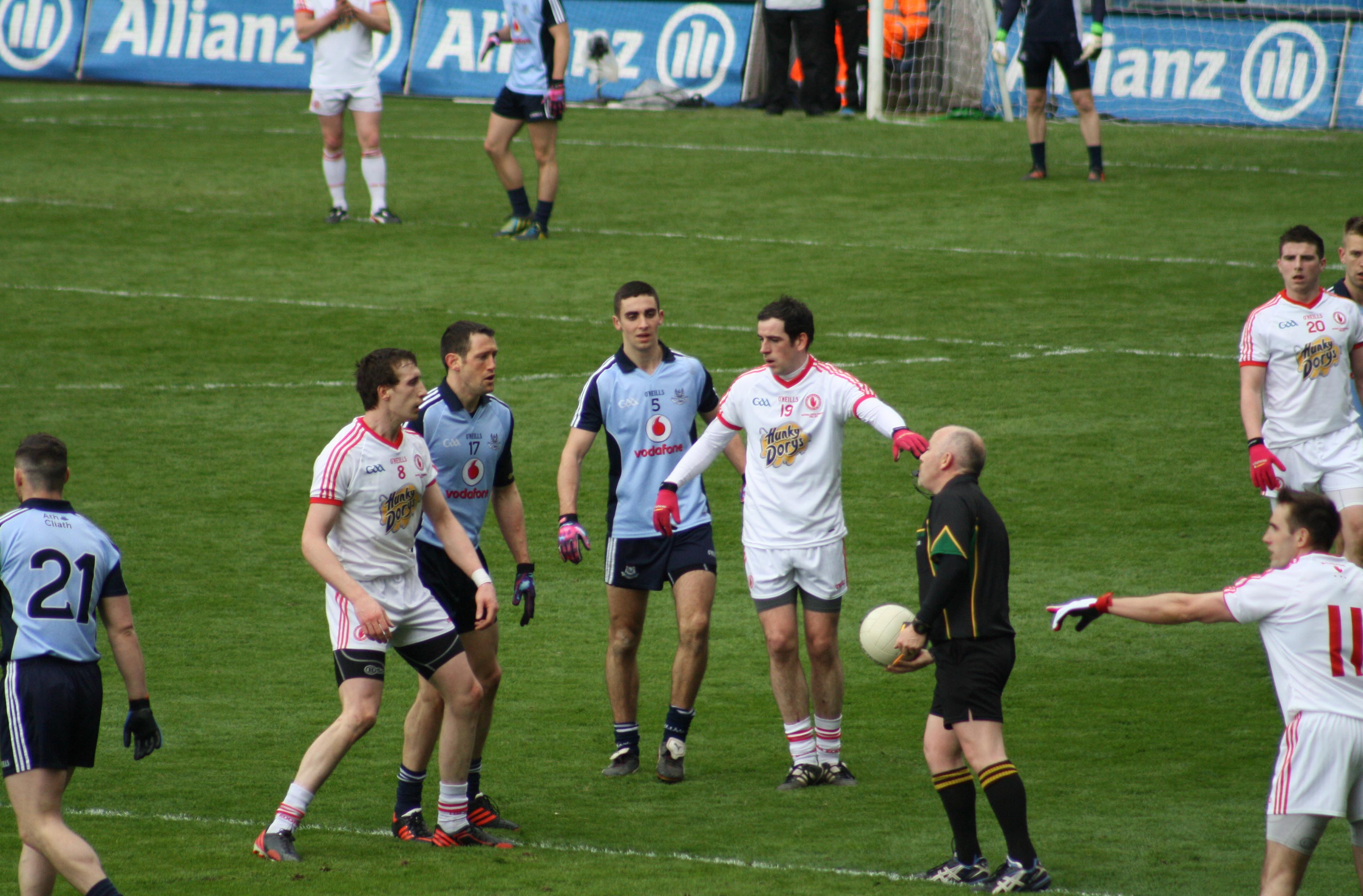
Dublin (blue) against Tyrone (white) in the 2013 National Football League Final

The 2013 National Football League known for sponsorship reasons as the Allianz National Football League was the 82nd staging of the National Football League (NFL), an annual Gaelic football tournament for the Gaelic Athletic Association county teams of Ireland. The League began on Saturday 1 February 2014. Thirty-one Gaelic football county teams from the island of Ireland, plus London, participated. Kilkenny, who participated in previous years, withdrew from the competition.

The reigning League Champions were Cork. 2012 All-Ireland Champions Donegal competed in the top division, as did Mayo whom they beat in the 2012 All-Ireland Senior Football Championship Final. The losing All-Ireland finalists in 2010 and 2011, respectively Down and Kerry, were there too. The top division was completed by newly promoted Kildare and Tyrone and 2011 All-Ireland Champions Dublin. All-Ireland Champions Donegal travelled to Croke Park to play Kildare in their first league game of the season on 3 February 2013.

On 28 April, Dublin defeated Tyrone by 0-18 to 0-17 to win their first league title since 1993. Two late points by Dean Rock and one by Jack McCaffrey in the final four minutes steered Dublin to victory

== Format ==
=== League structure ===
The 2013 format of the National Football League was a system of four divisions of eight teams. Each team played every other team in its division once, either home or away. 2 points were awarded for a win and 1 for a draw.

=== Tie-breaker ===
If only two teams were level on points:

- The team that won the head-to-head match was ranked first
- If this game was a draw, points difference (total scored minus total conceded in all games) was used to rank the teams
- If points difference was identical, total scored was used to rank the teams
- If still identical, a play-off was required

If three or more teams were level on points, points difference was used to rank the teams.

=== Finals, promotions and relegations ===
The top four teams in Division 1 contested the 2013 NFL semi-finals (first played fourth and second played third) and final. The top two teams in divisions 2, 3 and 4 were promoted, and contested the finals of their respective divisions. The bottom two teams in divisions 1, 2 and 3 were relegated.

== Division 1 ==
=== Table ===
Compete in Division 1 semi-finals Automatic relegation to Division 2

Team	Pld	W	D	L	F	A	Diff	Pts
Dublin	7	5	1	1	8-105	5-75	39	11
Tyrone	7	5	0	2	6-87	4-85	8	10
Kildare	7	4	0	3	10-74	8-93	-13	8
Mayo	7	3	0	4	2-87	5-75	3	6
Cork	7	3	0	4	6-73	4-85	-6	6
Kerry	7	3	0	4	2-66	7-70	-19	6
Donegal	7	2	1	4	3-78	4-75	0	5
Down	7	2	0	5	6-72	6-84	-12	4

^{1}Mayo, Cork and Kerry are ranked by points difference.

=== Rounds 1 to 7 ===
02/02/13; Round 1	Down	1-8 - 1-11	Tyrone	Páirc Esler, Newry; Referee: B Cassidy
02/02/13; Round 1	D O'Hare (1-3), B Coulter (0-2), R Mallon (0-2), C Harrison (0-1)		S O'Neill (0-3), Mark Donnelly (1-0), C Clarke (0-2), C McAliskey (0-2), N Morgan (0-2), S Cavanagh (0-2)	Páirc Esler, Newry; Referee: B Cassidy

02/02/13; Round 1	Kildare	2-14 - 1-13	Donegal	Croke Park, Dublin; Referee: C Reilly
02/02/13; Round 1	J Doyle (1-5), N Kelly (0-3), T O'Connor (1-0), M Conway (0-2), B Flanagan (0-1), E O'Flaherty (0-1), P Brophy (0-1), P O'Neill (0-1)		M Murphy (0-9), D Molloy (1-1), P McBrearty (0-2), M McHugh (0-1)	Croke Park, Dublin; Referee: C Reilly

02/02/13; Round 1	Dublin	1-18 - 2-9	Cork	Croke Park, Dublin; Referee: E Kinsella
02/02/13; Round 1	B Brogan (0-6), P Andrews (0-5), D Connolly (1-2), J McCaffrey (0-2), C O'Sullivan (0-1), P Ryan (0-1)		A Walsh (1-2), D O'Connor (1-2), J O'Rourke (0-2), P Kerrigan (0-2), F Goold (0-1)	Croke Park, Dublin; Referee: E Kinsella

03/02/13; Round 1	Mayo	0-15 - 1-6	Kerry	MacHale Park, Castlebar; Referee: P Hughes
03/02/13; Round 1	J Doherty (0-6), K McLoughlin (0-3), M Conroy (0-3), E Varley (0-2), R Feeney (0-1)		J O'Donoghue (1-0), M O'Donoghue (0-2), A Maher (0-1), C Cox (0-1), D O'Sullivan (0-1), J Buckley (0-1)	MacHale Park, Castlebar; Referee: P Hughes

09/02/13; Round 2	Donegal	0-12 - 0-7	Down	MacCumhail Park, Ballybofey; Referee: Marty Duffy
09/02/13; Round 2	M Murphy (0-6), C McFadden (0-1), D McLaughlin (0-1), D Walsh (0-1), L McLoone (0-1), R Kavanagh (0-1), R Wherity (0-1)		D O'Hare (0-5), K McKernan (0-2)	MacCumhail Park, Ballybofey; Referee: Marty Duffy

09/02/13; Round 2	Cork	1-9 - 2-10	Kildare	Páirc Uí Rinn, Cork; Referee: R Hickey
09/02/13; Round 2	C O'Neill (0-3), D O'Connor (0-3), C Sheehan (1-0), A Walsh (0-1), J O'Rourke (0-1), P Kerrigan (0-1)		M Conway (0-4), N Kelly (1-0), P Brophy (1-0), P O'Neill (0-2), S Johnston (0-2), D Flynn (0-1), J Doyle (0-1)	Páirc Uí Rinn, Cork; Referee: R Hickey

10/02/13; Round 2	Kerry	0-4 - 1-11	Dublin	Fitzgerald Stadium, Killarney; Referee: D Coldrick
10/02/13; Round 2	J O'Donoghue (0-1), M O'Donoghue (0-1), P Curtin (0-1)		B Brogan (0-7), P Andrews (0-3), C Dias (1-0), P Ryan (0-1)	Fitzgerald Stadium, Killarney; Referee: D Coldrick

10/02/13; Round 2	Mayo	1-11 - 1-12	Tyrone	MacHale Park, Castlebar; Referee: M Deegan
10/02/13; Round 2	J Doherty (0-6), K McLoughlin (0-3), K Higgins (1-0), D Vaughan (0-1), L Keegan (0-1)		S O'Neill (1-1), N Morgan (0-2), P Harte (0-2), S Cavanagh (0-2), C McAliskey (0-1), C McCarron (0-1), D McCurry (0-1), M Penrose (0-1), R McNamee (0-1)	MacHale Park, Castlebar; Referee: M Deegan

02/03/13; Round 3	Dublin	2-14 - 0-16	Mayo	Croke Park, Dublin; Referee: C Reilly
02/03/13; Round 3	B Brogan (1-10), K McManamon (1-1), P Andrews (0-2), C O'Sullivan (0-1)		J Doherty (0-6), K McLoughlin (0-3), L Keegan (0-3), E Varley (0-2), A O'Shea (0-1), M Conroy (0-1)	Croke Park, Dublin; Referee: C Reilly

03/03/13; Round 3	Kildare	2-8 - 0-12	Kerry	St Conleth's Park, Newbridge; Referee: E Kinsella
03/03/13; Round 3	S Johnston (1-3), J Doyle (1-2), E Bolton (0-1), N Kelly (0-1), P Brophy (0-1)		J Buckley (0-4), J O'Donoghue (0-4), J Lyne (0-2), P Crowley (0-1)	St Conleth's Park, Newbridge; Referee: E Kinsella

03/03/13; Round 3	Tyrone	1-13 - 0-12	Donegal	Healy Park, Omagh; Referee: J McQuillan
03/03/13; Round 3	S O'Neill (1-2), N Morgan (0-3), P Harte (0-2), S Cavanagh (0-2), Joe McMahon (0-1), Mark Donnelly (0-1), R McKenna (0-1), R McNamee (0-1)		C McFadden (0-5), M Murphy (0-3), A Thompson (0-1), L McLoone (0-1), P McBrearty (0-1), R Wherity (0-1)	Healy Park, Omagh; Referee: J McQuillan

03/03/13; Round 3	Down	1-17 - 3-12	Cork	Páirc Esler, Newry; Referee: M Deegan
03/03/13; Round 3	D O'Hare (0-9), C Harrison (1-1), M Poland (0-2), A Carr (0-1), C Laverty (0-1), K McKernan (0-1), P McComiskey (0-1), R Mallon (0-1)		A Walsh (0-5), C Sheehan (1-1), D O'Connor (0-3), T Clancy (1-0), C O'Neill (0-2), P Kerrigan (0-1)	Páirc Esler, Newry; Referee: M Deegan

09/03/13; Round 4	Down	0-13 - 0-11	Mayo	Páirc Esler, Newry; Referee: D Coldrick
09/03/13; Round 4	D O'Hare (0-9), C Laverty (0-1), M Poland (0-1), P McComiskey (0-1), R Mallon (0-1)		J Doherty (0-4), C Carolan (0-3), B Moran (0-1), K McLoughlin (0-1), K O'Malley (0-1), M Conroy (0-1)	Páirc Esler, Newry; Referee: D Coldrick

10/03/13; Round 4	Tyrone	0-8 - 0-14	Cork	Healy Park, Omagh; Referee: C Reilly
10/03/13; Round 4	R O'Neill (0-2), C Gormley (0-1), Joe McMahon (0-1), K Coney (0-1), M Penrose (0-1), S Cavanagh (0-1), S O'Neill (0-1)		C O'Neill (0-5), A Walsh (0-3), D O'Connor (0-2), P Kerrigan (0-2), B O'Driscoll (0-1), M Collins (0-1)	Healy Park, Omagh; Referee: C Reilly

10/03/13; Round 4	Donegal	1-12 - 0-6	Kerry	MacCumhail Park, Ballybofey; Referee: D Fahy
10/03/13; Round 4	M Murphy (1-5), L McLoone (0-2), C McFadden (0-1), N Gallagher (0-1), P McBrearty (0-1), R Bradley (0-1), R Kavanagh (0-1)		J Buckley (0-3), Darren O'Sullivan (0-1), E Brosnan (0-1)	MacCumhail Park, Ballybofey; Referee: D Fahy

10/03/13; Round 4	Dublin	2-20 - 2-9	Kildare	Croke Park, Dublin; Referee: J McQuillan
10/03/13; Round 4	B Brogan (1-5), C Kilkenny (0-4), J McCaffrey (1-1), P Andrews (0-3), D Connolly (0-2), K McManamon (0-2), D Daly (0-1), P Flynn (0-1), P Ryan (0-1)		S Johnston (1-2), E Bolton (1-1), B Flanagan (0-1), E O'Flaherty (0-1), J Doyle (0-1), M Conway (0-1)	Croke Park, Dublin; Referee: J McQuillan

16/03/13; Round 5	Cork	0-12 - 0-10	Donegal	Páirc Uí Rinn, Cork; Referee: D Coldrick
16/03/13; Round 5	C O'Neill (0-2), L Shorten (0-2), M Collins (0-2), P Kissane (0-2), A O'Sullivan (0-1), A Walsh (0-1), B O'Driscoll (0-1), P Kerrigan (0-1)		M Murphy (0-5), C McFadden (0-3), D Molloy (0-1), P McBrearty (0-1)	Páirc Uí Rinn, Cork; Referee: D Coldrick

16/03/13; Round 5	Dublin	1-14 - 0-18	Tyrone	Croke Park, Dublin; Referee: M Duffy
16/03/13; Round 5	D Connolly (0-6), P Ryan (1-0), K McManamon (0-2), P Andrews (0-2), P Flynn (0-2), C Dias (0-1)		S Cavanagh (0-4), S O'Neill (0-4), Mark Donnelly (0-2), P Harte (0-2), P Kane (0-2), C Cavanagh (0-1), M Penrose (0-1), N Morgan (0-1), P McNeice (0-1)	Croke Park, Dublin; Referee: M Duffy

16/03/13; Round 5	Mayo	0-13 - 1-11	Kildare	MacHale Park, Castlebar; Referee: M Higgins
16/03/13; Round 5	E Regan (0-3), C Boyle (0-2), C Carolan (0-2), C O'Connor (0-2), J Doherty (0-2), K McLoughlin (0-1), T Cunniffe (0-1)		S Johnston (0-4), E Doyle (1-0), N Kelly (0-2), D Flynn (0-1), E O'Flaherty (0-1), F Dowling (0-1), J Doyle (0-1), P Brophy (0-1)	MacHale Park, Castlebar; Referee: M Higgins

16/03/13; Round 5	Kerry	0-11 - 1-5	Down	Austin Stack Park, Tralee; Referee: R Hickey
16/03/13; Round 5	J Buckley (0-5), Declan O'Sullivan (0-3), B Maguire (0-2), J Lyne (0-1)		D O'Hare (1-2), A McConville (0-1), B Coulter (0-1), C Harrison (0-1)	Austin Stack Park, Tralee; Referee: R Hickey

23/03/13; Round 5	Dublin	1-15 - 0-9	Down	Croke Park, Dublin; Referee: F Kelly
23/03/13; Round 5	P Mannion (0-5), D Connolly (0-4), K McManamon (1-0), P Andrews (0-2), B Cullen (0-1), C O'Sullivan (0-1), N Devereux (0-1), S Cluxton (0-1)		D O'Hare (0-3), M Poland (0-2), B McArdle (0-1), D Savage (0-1), K McKernan (0-1), P McComiskey (0-1)	Croke Park, Dublin; Referee: F Kelly

24/03/13; Round 6	Kerry	0-11 - 0-7	Cork	Austin Stack Park, Tralee; Referee: C Reilly
24/03/13; Round 6	J Buckley (0-6), A Maher (0-1), K Donaghy (0-1), K O'Leary (0-1), K Young (0-1), P Galvin (0-1)		B O'Driscoll (0-2), T Clancy (0-2), A O'Sullivan (0-1), A Walsh (0-1), F Goold (0-1)	Austin Stack Park, Tralee; Referee: C Reilly

24/03/13; Round 6	Mayo	1-10 - 0-9	Donegal	MacHale Park, Castlebar; Referee: Marty Duffy
24/03/13; Round 6	C O'Connor (0-5), M Conroy (1-0), E Varley (0-2), K McLoughlin (0-2), C Boyle (0-1)		C McFadden (0-3), M Murphy (0-3), M O'Reilly (0-1), R Kavanagh (0-1), R McHugh (0-1)	MacHale Park, Castlebar; Referee: Marty Duffy

24/03/13; Round 6	Kildare	0-10 - 1-13	Tyrone	St Conleth's Park, Newbridge; Referee: Michael Duffy
24/03/13; Round 6	P Cribbin (0-3), S Johnston (0-2), A Smith (0-1), E Callaghan (0-1), E O'Flaherty (0-1), R Sweeney (0-1), S Hurley (0-1)		N Morgan (0-3), S O'Neill (0-3), Mark Donnelly (1-0), C McAliskey (0-2), P Harte (0-2), A Cassidy (0-1), P McNiece (0-1), R McKenna (0-1)	St Conleth's Park, Newbridge; Referee: Michael Duffy

07/04/13; Round 7	Down	3-13 - 1-12	Kildare	Páirc Esler, Newry; Referee: David Gough
07/04/13; Round 7	K McKernan (1-3), E McCartan (2-0), D O'Hare (0-4), N Madine (0-2), B Coulter (0-1), P Devlin (0-1), R Boyle (0-1), R Mallon (0-1)		J Doyle (0-5), P O'Neill (1-0), E O'Flaherty (0-2), P Cribbin (0-2), A Smith (0-1), E Callaghan (0-1), P Kelly (0-1)	Páirc Esler, Newry; Referee: David Gough

07/04/13; Round 7	Cork	0-10 - 0-11	Mayo	Páirc Uí Chaoimh, Cork; Referee: M Deegan
07/04/13; Round 7	D Goulding (0-4), F Goold (0-3), A Walsh (0-1), M Collins (0-1), P Kissane (0-1)		K McLoughlin (0-4), C O'Connor (0-3), A Freeman (0-1), A O'Shea (0-1), D Vaughan (0-1), M Conroy (0-1)	Páirc Uí Chaoimh, Cork; Referee: M Deegan

07/04/13; Round 7	Tyrone	2-12 - 1-16	Kerry	Healy Park, Omagh; Referee: Marty Duffy
07/04/13; Round 7	S O'Neill (1-1), M Donnelly (1-0), C Clarke (0-2), D McCurry (0-2), S Cavanagh (0-2), C Gormley (0-1), Joe McMahon (0-1), N Morgan (0-1), P Harte (0-1), R O'Neill (0-1)		C Cooper (0-3), Declan O'Sullivan (0-3), J Buckley (0-3), K Donaghy (0-3), Darran O'Sullivan (0-2), J Lyne (0-1)	Healy Park, Omagh; Referee: Marty Duffy

07/04/13; Round 7	Donegal	1-10 - 0-13	Dublin	MacCumhail Park, Ballybofey; Referee: P Hughes
07/04/13; Round 7	C McFadden (1-2), M Murphy (0-3), P McBrearty (0-3), M McHugh (0-1), R Bradley (0-1)		P Mannion (0-6), P Andrews (0-3), C O'Sullivan (0-1), D Connolly (0-1), J McCaffrey (0-1), S Cluxton (0-1)	MacCumhail Park, Ballybofey; Referee: P Hughes

=== Division 1 Semi-finals ===
14/04/13	Dublin	2-16 - 0-16	Mayo	Croke Park, Dublin; Referee: J McQuillan; Man of the Match: Paul Mannion
14/04/13	P Mannion (1-4), B Brogan (0-5), J Whelan (1-1), D Connolly (0-3), D Daly (0-1), J McCaffrey (0-1), S Cluxton (0-1)		C O'Connor (0-8), M Conroy (0-3), A O'Shea (0-2), C Carolan (0-1), J Gibbons (0-1), K McLoughlin (0-1)	Croke Park, Dublin; Referee: J McQuillan; Man of the Match: Paul Mannion

14/04/13	Tyrone	2-15 - 2-11	Kildare	Croke Park, Dublin; Referee: R Hickey
14/04/13	Mattie Donnelly (1-2), S O'Neill (0-4), Mark Donnelly (1-1), C McAliskey (0-2), S Cavanagh (0-2), A Cassidy (0-1), D McCurry (0-1), M Penrose (0-1), N Morgan (0-1)		J Doyle (0-6), P Brophy (1-1), P O'Neill (0-3), P Cribbin (1-0), E O'Flaherty (0-1)	Croke Park, Dublin; Referee: R Hickey

=== Division 1 final ===
28/04/13	Dublin	0-18 - 0-17	Tyrone	Croke Park, Dublin; Referee: Marty Duffy; Man of the Match: Niall Morgan
28/04/13	B Brogan (0-5), P Mannion (0-4), D Connolly (0-2), D Rock (0-2), B Cullen (0-1), J McCaffrey (0-1), P Andrews (0-1), P McMahon (0-1), S Cluxton (0-1)	Report	N Morgan (0-5), S Cavanagh (0-4), C McAliskey (0-3), M Penrose (0-2), C Gormley (0-1), Mark Donnelly (0-1), Matthew Donnelly (0-1)	Croke Park, Dublin; Referee: Marty Duffy; Man of the Match: Niall Morgan

== Division 2 ==
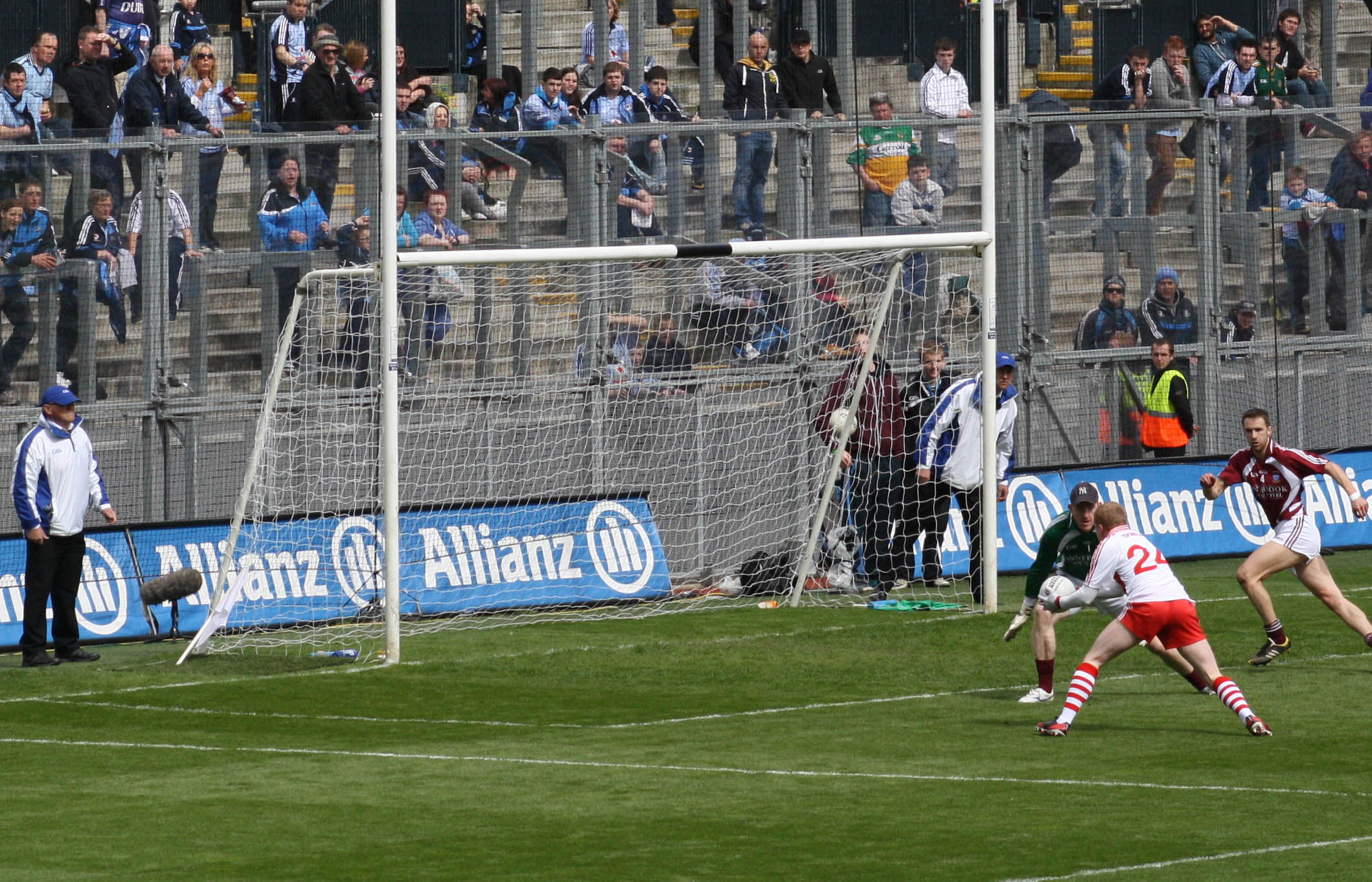
The Division 2 final sees Westmeath take on Derry

=== Table ===
Compete in Division 2 final and automatic promotion to Division 1 Automatic relegation to Division 3

Team	Pld	W	D	L	F	A	Diff	Pts
Derry	7	5	1	1	5-112	5-74	38	11
Westmeath	7	5	1	1	8-79	6-87	-2	11
Laois	7	4	1	2	5-94	6-75	16	9
Louth	7	3	1	3	9-87	7-89	4	7
Galway	7	3	1	3	6-88	4-99	-5	7
Armagh	7	2	2	3	8-89	7-94	-2	6
Wexford	7	2	1	4	8-74	11-87	-22	5
Longford	7	0	0	7	8-53	11-71	-27	0

^{1}Derry are placed ahead of Westmeath because they won the head-to-head game between the teams (2-17 to 1-05).

^{2}Louth are placed ahead of Galway because they won the head-to-head game between the teams (0-17 to 0-11).

=== Rounds 1 to 7 ===
02/02/13; Round 1	Laois	0-20 - 1-10	Armagh	O'Moore Park, Portlaoise; Referee: R Hickey
02/02/13; Round 1	R Munnelly (0-7), B Sheehan (0-4), D Kingston (0-4), D Strong (0-2), B Quigley (0-1), C Boyle (0-1), P Clancy (0-1)		B Mallon (1-1), E Rafferty (0-3), S Forker (0-3), G McParland (0-1), M Shields (0-1), S Harold (0-1)	O'Moore Park, Portlaoise; Referee: R Hickey

03/02/13; Round 1	Wexford	2-8 - 1-10	Longford	Wexford Park, Wexford; Referee: C Lane
03/02/13; Round 1	B Brosnan (0-6), R Barry (1-0), A Flynn (0-1), S Roche (0-1)		S McCormack (0-4), F McGee (0-3), R Smyth (1-0), D McElligott (0-1), M Quinn (0-1), S Mulligan (0-1)	Wexford Park, Wexford; Referee: C Lane

03/02/13; Round 1	Westmeath	0-16 - 2-9	Louth	Cusack Park, Mullingar; Referee: G McCormack
03/02/13; Round 1	J Heslin (0-5), C McCormack (0-5), D Glennon (0-3), K Martin (0-2), D Dolan (0-1)		S Lennon (0-4), A Reid (1-1), C Judge (1-0), J McEneaney (0-2), D Reid (0-1), A McDonnell (0-1)	Cusack Park, Mullingar; Referee: G McCormack

03/02/13; Round 1	Galway	1-15 - 0-15	Derry	Pearse Stadium, Salthill; Referee: Michael Duffy
03/02/13; Round 1	M Meehan (1-5), M Martin (0-3), S Armstrong (0-2), D Cummins (0-1), E Concannon (0-1), G O'Donnell (0-1), M Hehir (0-1), P Conroy (0-1)		E Bradley (0-3), E Lynn (0-2), J Kielt (0-2), R Bell (0-2), B McGoldrick (0-1), Patsy Bradley (0-1), R Wilkinson (0-1)	Pearse Stadium, Salthill; Referee: Michael Duffy

10/02/13; Round 2	Longford	1-8 - 2-7	Westmeath	Pearse Park, Longford; Referee: D Gough
10/02/13; Round 2	S McCormack (1-7), R Smyth (0-1)		J Heslin (0-4), Des Dolan (1-0), K Martin (1-0), C McCormack (0-2), D Corroon (0-1)	Pearse Park, Longford; Referee: D Gough

10/02/13; Round 2	Derry	1-17 - 2-11	Laois	Celtic Park, Derry; Referee: J McQuilla
10/02/13; Round 2	E McGuckin (1-3), J Kielt (0-3), R Ferris (0-2), D McBride (0-1), E Lynn (0-1), M Lynch (0-1)		R Munnelly (1-4), G Walsh (0-3), D O'Connor (1-0), C Boyle (0-1), C Kelly (0-1), D Strong (0-1), P McMahon (0-1)	Celtic Park, Derry; Referee: J McQuilla

23/02/13; Round 2	Louth	0-17 - 0-11	Galway	Drogheda Park, Drogheda; Referee: D Fahy
23/02/13; Round 2	B White (0-4), P Keenan (0-3), S Lennon (0-3), D Maguire (0-2), A McDonnell (0-1), A Reid (0-1), C Byrne (0-1), K Rogers (0-1), M Brennan (0-1)		M Meehan (0-3), S Armstrong (0-3), N Coleman (0-2), D Cummins (0-1), E Concannon (0-1), M Martin (0-1)	Drogheda Park, Drogheda; Referee: D Fahy

23/02/13; Round 2	Armagh	3-8 - 3-8	Wexford	Athletic Grounds, Armagh; Referee: J Curley
23/02/13; Round 2	G McParland (3-0), S Forker (0-4), A Forker (0-1), B Loughran (0-1), E Rafferty (0-1), S Campbell (0-1)		B Brosnan (0-5), S Roche (1-1), P Byrne (1-0), R Barry (1-0)	Athletic Grounds, Armagh; Referee: J Curley

02/03/13; Round 3	Armagh	3-8 - 2-9	Longford	Athletic Grounds, Armagh; Referee: M Duffy
02/03/13; Round 3	J Clarke (1-2), S Forker (1-2), T Kernan (1-1), A Kernan (0-2), K Dyas (0-1)		F McGee (2-2), S McCormack (0-7)	Athletic Grounds, Armagh; Referee: M Duffy

02/03/13; Round 3	Laois	1-17 - 2-14	Louth	O'Moore Park, Portlaoise; Referee: P O'Sullivan
02/03/13; Round 3	G Walsh (0-6), J O'Loughlin (1-2), R Munnelly (0-4), C Begley (0-2), B Sheehan (0-1)		K Rogers (1-3), B White (0-4), A McDonnell (1-1), S Lennon (0-3), A Reid (0-1), D Crilly (0-1), R Carroll (0-1)	O'Moore Park, Portlaoise; Referee: P O'Sullivan

03/03/13; Round 3	Galway	0-13 - 0-13	Westmeath	St Jarlath's Park, Tuam; Referee: Marty Duffy
03/03/13; Round 3	P Conroy (0-4), M Martin (0-3), M Meehan (0-2), E Concannon (0-1), G Bradshaw (0-1), G O'Donnell (0-1), M Boyle (0-1)		K Martin (0-4), D Corroon (1-0), C McCormack (0-2), D Glennon (0-2), J Heslin (0-2)	St Jarlath's Park, Tuam; Referee: Marty Duffy

03/03/13; Round 3	Wexford	0-10 - 0-19	Derry	Wexford Park, Wexford; Referee: M Collins
03/03/13; Round 3	B Brosnan (0-3), S Roche (0-3), A Flynn (0-2), R Quinlivan (0-1)		E McGuckin (0-5), E Lynn (0-4), J Kielt (0-2), R Wilkinson (0-2), C Kielt (0-1), G O'Kane (0-1), M Lynch (0-1), P Bradley (0-1)	Wexford Park, Wexford; Referee: M Collins

09/03/13; Round 4	Derry	0-16 - 0-16	Armagh	Celtic Park, Derry; Referee: F Kelly
09/03/13; Round 4	J Kielt (0-8), L Kennedy (0-3), C Kielt (0-1), D Heavron (0-1), E Lynn (0-1), E McGuckin (0-1), M Lynch (0-1)		A Kernan (0-3), G McParland (0-3), J Clarke (0-3), S Forker (0-2), A Duffy (0-1), D McKenna (0-1), J Hanratty (0-1), K Dyas (0-1), S Harold (0-1)	Celtic Park, Derry; Referee: F Kelly

10/03/13; Round 4	Louth	2-9 - 2-13	Wexford	Drogheda Park, Drogheda; Referee: C Branagan
10/03/13; Round 4	S Lennon (1-2), B White (0-3), C Rafferty (1-0), A Reid (0-1), B Donnelly (0-1), K Rogers (0-1), P Keenan (0-1)		S Roche (1-5), P Byrne (1-0), C Carty (0-2), R Barry (0-2), A Flynn (0-1), J Holmes (0-1)	Drogheda Park, Drogheda; Referee: C Branagan

10/03/13; Round 4	Westmeath	1-10 - 1-8	Laois	Cusack Park, Mullingar; Referee: D Gough
10/03/13; Round 4	J Heslin (1-7), C McCormack (0-1), Dessie Dolan (0-1), J Dolan (0-1)		G Walsh (1-1), C Boyle (0-1), P O'Leary (0-1)	Cusack Park, Mullingar; Referee: D Gough

10/03/13; Round 4	Longford	3-7 - 3-11	Galway	Pearse Park, Longford; Referee: N Mooney
10/03/13; Round 4	S McCormack (2-4), D McElligott (1-2), C Smith (0-1)		M Martin (0-5), E Concannon (1-1), M Meehan (1-1), P Conroy (1-1), N Coleman (0-2), G Sice (0-1)	Pearse Park, Longford; Referee: N Mooney

16/03/13; Round 5	Derry	0-14 - 0-5	Longford	Celtic Park, Derry; Referee: C O'Hagan
16/03/13; Round 5	J Kielt (0-4), E Bradley (0-3), E Lynn (0-2), R Wilkinson (0-2), D Heavron (0-1), G O'Kane (0-1), M Lynch (0-1)		B McElvaney (0-3), S McCormack (0-2)	Celtic Park, Derry; Referee: C O'Hagan

16/03/13; Round 5	Laois	1-15 - 0-10	Galway	O'Moore Park, Portlaoise; Referee: C Lane
16/03/13; Round 5	G Walsh (1-4), R Munnelly (0-4), D Kingston (0-1), D O'Connor (0-1), P Clancy (0-1)		P Conroy (0-4), M Martin (0-3), G Sice (0-1), M Meehan (0-1), N Coleman (0-1)	O'Moore Park, Portlaoise; Referee: C Lane

16/03/13; Round 5	Armagh	1-10 - 1-12	Louth	Athletic Grounds, Armagh; Referee: E Kinsella
16/03/13; Round 5	G McParland (0-3), T Kernan (1-0), S Forker (0-2), S Harold (0-2), C Rafferty (0-1), D McKenna (0-1), S Campbell (0-1)		A Reid (1-1), S Lennon (0-3), B White (0-2), K Rogers (0-2), B Donnelly (0-1), C Byrne (0-1), D Crilly (0-1), D Maguire (0-1)	Athletic Grounds, Armagh; Referee: E Kinsella

18/03/13; Round 5	Wexford	0-16 - 4-11	Westmeath	Wexford Park, Wexford; Referee: B O'Shea
18/03/13; Round 5	B Brosnan (0-7), S Roche (0-3), A Flynn (0-1), D Waters (0-1), J Holmes (0-1), M Furlong (0-1), R Barry (0-1)		J Heslin (1-4), D Glennon (2-1), C McCormack (0-3), C Curley (1-0), K Martin (0-2), G Egan (0-1), P Sharry (0-1)	Wexford Park, Wexford; Referee: B O'Shea

24/03/13; Round 6	Westmeath	0-17 - 0-16	Armagh	Cusack Park, Mullingar; Referee: C Lane
24/03/13; Round 6	J Heslin (0-5), D Glennon (0-4), C McCormack (0-3), Dessie Dolan (0-2), K Martin (0-2), G Egan (0-1)		A Kernan (0-7), S Forker (0-6), C Vernon (0-1), S Harold (0-1), T Kernan (0-1)	Cusack Park, Mullingar; Referee: C Lane

24/03/13; Round 6	Louth	1-12 - 2-14	Derry	Drogheda Park, Drogheda; Referee: M Higgins
24/03/13; Round 6	S Lennon (1-5), B White (0-2), C Byrne (0-1), C Rafferty (0-1), D Clarke (0-1), D Crilly (0-1), K Rogers (0-1)		J Kielt (1-3), E Bradley (0-4), L Kennedy (0-3), B Heron (1-0), E Lynn (0-2), G O'Kane (0-2)	Drogheda Park, Drogheda; Referee: M Higgins

24/03/13; Round 6	Longford	0-6 - 0-9	Laois	Pearse Park, Longford; Referee: M Collins
24/03/13; Round 6	S McCormack (0-3), D McElligott (0-2), F McGee (0-1)		C Kelly (0-2), G Walsh (0-2), K Meaney (0-2), R Munnelly (0-2), D Kingston (0-1)	Pearse Park, Longford; Referee: M Collins

24/03/13; Round 6	Galway	1-16 - 0-11	Wexford	Pearse Stadium, Salthill; Referee: P O'Sullivan
24/03/13; Round 6	S Armstrong (0-5), D Cummins (0-3), M Martin (0-3), G Sice (1-0), M Meehan (0-2), C Doherty (0-1), G Bradshaw (0-1), P Conroy (0-1)		S Roche (0-4), B Brosnan (0-2), A Flynn (0-1), R Barry (0-1)	Pearse Stadium, Salthill; Referee: P O'Sullivan

07/04/13; Round 7	Derry	2-17 - 1-5	Westmeath	Celtic Park, Derry; Referee: C Branagan
07/04/13; Round 7	J Kielt (2-1), E Bradley (0-5), L Kennedy (0-3), R Bell (0-2), A McAlynn (0-1), C Devlin (0-1), C Kielt (0-1), C McKaigue (0-1), E Lynn (0-1), R Wilkinson (0-1)		Dessie Dolan (0-3), P Sharry (1-0), D Corroon (0-1), K Martin (0-1)	Celtic Park, Derry; Referee: C Branagan

07/04/13; Round 7	Louth	1-14 - 1-8	Longford	Drogheda Park, Drogheda; Referee: D Brazil
07/04/13; Round 7	S Lennon (1-4), B White (0-6), A Reid (0-1), C Byrne (0-1), D Crilly (0-1), P Keenan (0-1)		S McCormack (1-5), B McElvaney (0-1), M Quinn (0-1)	Drogheda Park, Drogheda; Referee: D Brazil

07/04/13; Round 7	Wexford	1-8 - 0-14	Laois	Wexford Park, Wexford; Referee: C Lane
07/04/13; Round 7	R Barry (1-0), S Roche (0-2), B Brosnan (0-1), C Lyng (0-1), M Furlong (0-1), P Byrne (0-1)		P McMahon (0-3), R Munnelly (0-3), C Kelly (0-2), G Walsh (0-2), C Begley (0-1), K Meaney (0-1)	Wexford Park, Wexford; Referee: C Lane

07/04/13; Round 7	Armagh	0-21 - 1-12	Galway	Athletic Grounds, Armagh; Referee: M Higgins
07/04/13; Round 7	A Kernan (0-5), K Dyas (0-5), S Forker (0-4), S Harold (0-3), B Mallon (0-1), C Rafferty (0-1), S Clarke (0-1), T Kernan (0-1)		M Meehan (0-4), S Armstrong (0-4), D Cummins (0-3), C Doherty (1-0), G Bradshaw (0-1)	Athletic Grounds, Armagh; Referee: M Higgins

=== Division 2 final ===
28/04/13	Derry	1-18 - 0-15	Westmeath	Croke Park, Dublin; Referee: C Lane
28/04/13	E Bradley (0-4), J Kielt (0-4), E McGuckin (1-1), R Bell (0-2), B Heron (0-1), C McFaul (0-1), D Heavron (0-1), E Lynn (0-1), G O'Kane (0-1), R Wilkinson (0-1)	Report	J Heslin (0-5), Dessie Dolan (0-3), C McCormack (0-2), D Glennon (0-2), G Egan (0-2), C Curley (0-1)	Croke Park, Dublin; Referee: C Lane

== Division 3 ==
=== Table ===
Compete in Division 3 final and automatic promotion to Division 2 Automatic relegation to Division 4

Team	Pld	W	D	L	F	A	Diff	Pts
Monaghan	7	5	0	2	10-85	6-63	34	10
Meath	7	5	0	2	9-84	3-90	12	10
Fermanagh	7	4	1	2	5-93	7-69	18	9
Roscommon	7	4	1	2	5-75	8-61	5	9
Cavan	7	3	1	3	6-76	7-71	2	7
Sligo	7	2	1	4	7-69	4-91	-13	5
Antrim	7	1	2	4	5-76	10-85	-24	4
Wicklow	7	0	2	5	6-66	8-94	-34	2

^{1}Monaghan are placed ahead of Meath because they won the head-to-head game between the teams (1-18 to 2-03).

^{2}Roscommon are placed ahead of Fermanagh because they won the head-to-head game between the teams (2-12 to 2-06).

=== Rounds 1 to 7 ===
03/02/13; Round 1	Antrim	1-14 - 2-8	Cavan	Casement Park, Belfast; Referee: C O'Hagan
03/02/13; Round 1	M Pollock (1-1), C Murray (0-3), M Herron (0-3), R Murray (0-3), B Herron (0-1), J Crozier (0-1), K Niblock (0-1), S McVeigh (0-1)		M Dunne (1-3), M McKeever (1-1), D Givney (0-1), D McKiernan (0-1), G McKiernan (0-1), T Corr (0-1)	Casement Park, Belfast; Referee: C O'Hagan

03/02/13; Round 1	Monaghan	1-18 - 2-3	Meath	St Tiernach's Park, Clones; Referee: C Brannigan
03/02/13; Round 1	C McManus (0-8), D Hughes (1-1), D Clerkin (0-2), J McCarron (0-2), K Hughes (0-2), D Mone (0-1), G Doogan (0-1), O Lennon (0-1)		C Gillespie (1-0), J Queeney (1-0), B Farrell (0-1), D Carroll (0-1), S Tobin (0-1)	St Tiernach's Park, Clones; Referee: C Brannigan

03/02/13; Round 1	Wicklow	0-9 - 1-16	Fermanagh	Aughrim County Ground, Aughrim; Referee: D Brazil
03/02/13; Round 1	J McGrath (0-4), A Byrne (0-2), B McCrea (0-1), P McWalter (0-1), R Finn (0-1)		S Quigley (0-6), P Ward (0-4), T McElroy (1-1), D Keenan (0-2), R Jones (0-2), D McCusker (0-1)	Aughrim County Ground, Aughrim; Referee: D Brazil

03/02/13; Round 1	Roscommon	1-11 - 1-8	Sligo	Dr. Hyde Park, Roscommon; Referee: D Fahy
03/02/13; Round 1	D Smith (1-4), C Cregg (0-3), C Shine (0-1), D Shine (0-1), K Higgins (0-1), N Daly (0-1)		A Marren (1-2), M Breheny (0-3), J Martyn (0-1), S Coen (0-1), S McManus (0-1)	Dr. Hyde Park, Roscommon; Referee: D Fahy

09/02/13; Round 2	Cavan	1-10 - 0-5	Monaghan	Breffni Park, Cavan; Referee: B Cassidy
09/02/13; Round 2	G McKiernan (0-3), M Reilly (1-0), M Dunne (0-2), A Clarke (0-1), C Mackey (0-1), D Givney (0-1), J Brady (0-1), M McKeever (0-1)		T Freeman (0-2), C McManus (0-1), D Clerkin (0-1), P Dooney (0-1)	Breffni Park, Cavan; Referee: B Cassidy

09/02/13; Round 2	Fermanagh	2-12 - 2-6	Roscommon	Brewster Park, Enniskillen; Referee: N Mooney
09/02/13; Round 2	S Quigley (0-7), D Keenan (1-1), P Ward (1-0), D McCusker (0-1), E Donnelly (0-1), S McCabe (0-1), T McElroy (0-1)		D Smith (1-2), M Finneran (1-0), C Cregg (0-2), C Compton (0-1), F Cregg (0-1)	Brewster Park, Enniskillen; Referee: N Mooney

10/02/13; Round 2	Wicklow	0-8 - 0-16	Meath	Aughrim County Ground, Aughrim; Referee: F Barry
10/02/13; Round 2	A McLoughlin (0-2), J McGrath (0-2), J Stafford (0-2), B McCrea (0-1), P McWalter (0-1)		M Newman (0-5), S Tobin (0-4), P Byrne (0-2), B Meade (0-1), C Lenehan (0-1), G Reilly (0-1), P Gilsenan (0-1), P O'Rourke (0-1)	Aughrim County Ground, Aughrim; Referee: F Barry

10/02/13; Round 2	Sligo	1-12 - 0-13	Antrim	Markievicz Park, Sligo; Referee: L Devenney
10/02/13; Round 2	A Marren (0-4), M Breheny (0-4), P Hughes (1-0), B Curran (0-1), J Clarke (0-1), N Ewing (0-1), N Murphy (0-1)		C Murray (0-3), P Cunningham (0-3), M Pollock (0-2), R Murray (0-2), J Crozier (0-1), K Niblock (0-1), M McCann (0-1)	Markievicz Park, Sligo; Referee: L Devenney

02/03/13; Round 3	Meath	1-6 - 0-15	Cavan	Páirc Tailteann, Navan; Referee: M Higgins
02/03/13; Round 3	M Newman (1-3), G Reilly (0-2), D Larkin (0-1)		J Brady (0-4), G McKiernan (0-3), C Mackey (0-2), N McDermott (0-2), B Reilly (0-1), D Givney (0-1), M Reilly (0-1), T Corr (0-1)	Páirc Tailteann, Navan; Referee: M Higgins

02/03/13; Round 3	Antrim	2-9 - 1-12	Fermanagh	Casement Park, Belfast; Referee: M McNally
02/03/13; Round 3	K Niblock (1-1), S McVeigh (1-1), R Murray (0-3), T McCann (0-3), C Murray (0-1)		P Ward (0-3), S Quigley (0-3), T McElroy (0-3), D Keenan (1-0), C Quigley (0-1), E Donnelly (0-1), M O'Brien (0-1)	Casement Park, Belfast; Referee: M McNally

03/03/13; Round 3	Roscommon	0-13 - 1-10	Wicklow	Dr. Hyde Park, Roscommon; Referee: J Henry
03/03/13; Round 3	C Daly (0-3), C Shine (0-3), D Smith (0-3), D O'Gara (0-2), K Higgins (0-1), M Finneran (0-1)		J McGrath (0-6), C McGraynor (0-3), J Dalton (1-0), J Sheerin (0-1)	Dr. Hyde Park, Roscommon; Referee: J Henry

03/03/13; Round 3	Monaghan	1-12 - 0-7	Sligo	St Tiernach's Park, Clones; Referee: S McLaughlin
03/03/13; Round 3	C McGuinness (1-1), K Hughes (0-3), O Duffy (0-2), T Freeman (0-2), C Walshe (0-1), D Clerkin (0-1), P Finlay (0-1), R Beggan (0-1)		A Marren (0-6), N Murphy (0-1)	St Tiernach's Park, Clones; Referee: S McLaughlin

09/03/13; Round 4	Fermanagh	0-12 - 0-14	Monaghan	Brewster Park, Enniskillen; Referee: P Hughes
09/03/13; Round 4	P Ward (0-6), T Corrigan (0-3), D Keenan (0-1), R Jones (0-1), S McCabe (0-1)		C McManus (0-5), P Finlay (0-5), O Duffy (0-4)	Brewster Park, Enniskillen; Referee: P Hughes

10/03/13; Round 4	Wicklow	2-7 - 1-10	Antrim	Aughrim County Ground, Aughrim; Referee: D O'Mahony
10/03/13; Round 4	A McLoughlin (1-3), J McGrath (0-1), J Stafford (0-1), N Mernagh (0-1), S Furlong (0-1)		T McCann (1-4), C Murray (0-3), B Herron (0-1), P Cunningham (0-1), P Doherty (0-1)	Aughrim County Ground, Aughrim; Referee: D O'Mahony

10/03/13; Round 4	Sligo	2-9 - 1-12	Cavan	Markievicz Park, Sligo; Referee: E O'Grady
10/03/13; Round 4	S McManus (1-1), S Gilmartin (1-0), J Kilcullen (0-1), M Breheny (0-1), P Hughes (0-1)		B Reilly (0-4), E Keating (1-0), G McKiernan (0-2), N McDermott (0-2), C Mackey (0-1), D Givney (0-1), D O'Reilly (0-1), M Dunne (0-1)	Markievicz Park, Sligo; Referee: E O'Grady

10/03/13; Round 4	Roscommon	0-12 - 2-11	Meath	Dr. Hyde Park, Roscommon; Referee: N Cullen
10/03/13; Round 4	C Devaney (0-5), D Smith (0-2), K Higgins (0-2), C Compton (0-1), D Shine (0-1), S Oates (0-1)		C Ward (0-4), K Reilly (1-1), G Reilly (1-0), M Newman (0-2), C Lenihan (0-1), D Larkin (0-1), P Byrne (0-1), P Gilsenan (0-1)	Dr. Hyde Park, Roscommon; Referee: N Cullen

16/03/13; Round 5	Meath	1-17 - 2-12	Sligo	Páirc Tailteann, Navan; Referee: B Cassidy
16/03/13; Round 5	M Newman (0-8), B Lenehan (0-3), S Bray (1-0), B Meade (0-1), D Larkin (0-1), E Wallace (0-1), G Reilly (0-1), J Sheridan (0-1), P Gilsenan (0-1)		A Marren (1-5), M Breheny (0-3), S McManus (1-0), A McIntyre (0-2), K Cawley (0-1), P Hughes (0-1)	Páirc Tailteann, Navan; Referee: B Cassidy

16/03/13; Round 5	Antrim	1-6 - 0-11	Roscommon	Casement Park, Belfast; Referee: B Rice
16/03/13; Round 5	A Healy (1-0), C Kelly (0-2), T McCann (0-2), B Herron (0-1), C Duffin (0-1)		C Compton (0-3), C Cregg (0-3), D Smith (0-2), C Daly (0-1), D O'Gara (0-1), N Collins (0-1)	Casement Park, Belfast; Referee: B Rice

16/03/13; Round 5	Monaghan	5-13 - 3-10	Wicklow	St Tiernach's Park, Clones; Referee: F Kelly
16/03/13; Round 5	C McManus (2-7), P Finlay (1-1), C Walshe (1-0), K Hughes (0-2), D Hughes (0-1), N McAdam (0-1), T Freeman (0-1)		A O'Malley (2-1), S Furlong (1-3), C McGraynor (0-2), B McCrea (0-1), D Hayden (0-1), J Stafford (0-1)	St Tiernach's Park, Clones; Referee: F Kelly

16/03/13; Round 5	Cavan	1-10 - 1-12	Fermanagh	Breffni Park, Cavan; Referee: M Duffy
16/03/13; Round 5	M Dunne (1-4), B Reilly (0-1), C Mackey (0-1), D Givney (0-1), G McKiernan (0-1), M Reilly (0-1), N McDermott (0-1)		D Keenan (0-3), P Ward (0-3), D Kille (1-0), T Corrigan (0-2), M McGrath (0-1), R Jones (0-1), S Lyons (0-1), T McElroy (0-1)	Breffni Park, Cavan; Referee: M Duffy

24/03/13; Round 6	Roscommon	0-8 - 0-7	Monaghan	Dr. Hyde Park, Roscommon; Referee: D O'Mahony
24/03/13; Round 6	C Cregg (0-2), D Smith (0-2), C Daly (0-1), J Connaughton (0-1), K Higgins (0-1), M Finneran (0-1)		K Hughes (0-2), C McManus (0-1), D Hughes (0-1), O Duffy (0-1), O Lennon (0-1), P Finlay (0-1)	Dr. Hyde Park, Roscommon; Referee: D O'Mahony

24/03/13; Round 6	Fermanagh	0-15 - 0-9	Sligo	Brewster Park, Enniskillen; Referee: F Barry
24/03/13; Round 6	T Corrigan (0-5), P Ward (0-4), D McCusker (0-3), D Keenan (0-1), M O'Brien (0-1), T McElroy (0-1)		A Marren (0-7), F Quinn (0-1), N Murphy (0-1)	Brewster Park, Enniskillen; Referee: F Barry

24/03/13; Round 6	Wicklow	0-11 - 0-14	Cavan	Aughrim County Ground, Aughrim; Referee: K O'Brien
24/03/13; Round 6	S Furlong (0-5), J McGrath (0-2), N Mernagh (0-2), A O'Malley (0-1), D Healy (0-1)		M Dunne (0-8), B Reilly (0-1), D McKiernan (0-1), E Keating (0-1), M Reilly (0-1), N McDermott (0-1), T Corr (0-1)	Aughrim County Ground, Aughrim; Referee: K O'Brien

31/03/13; Round 6	Antrim	0-11 - 1-19	Meath	Casement Park, Belfast; Referee: S McLaughli
31/03/13; Round 6	P Cunningham (0-5), T McCann (0-3), C Kelly (0-1), K Niblock (0-1), S McVeigh (0-1)		M Newman (1-6), G Reilly (0-6), B Farrell (0-2), B Meade (0-1), C Gillespie (0-1), D Larkin (0-1), E Wallace (0-1), S Curran (0-1)	Casement Park, Belfast; Referee: S McLaughli

07/04/13; Round 7	Monaghan	3-16 - 0-13	Antrim	St Tiernach's Park, Clones; Referee: S Hehir
07/04/13; Round 7	C McManus (0-5), C McGuinness (1-2), K Hughes (1-2), D Hughes (1-0), D Clerkin (0-2), P Finlay (0-2), O Duffy (0-1), O Lennon (0-1), R Beggan (0-1)		P Cunningham (0-8), M Pollock (0-2), A McClean (0-1), C Murray (0-1), K Niblock (0-1)	St Tiernach's Park, Clones; Referee: S Hehir

07/04/13; Round 7	Sligo	1-12 - 0-11	Wicklow	Markievicz Park, Sligo; Referee: B Cassidy
07/04/13; Round 7	A Marren (0-6), M Breheny (0-3), P Hughes (1-0), N Murphy (0-2), B Egan (0-1)		J McGrath (0-5), A O'Malley (0-2), D Healy (0-1), K Murphy (0-1), P Earls (0-1), P MacWalter (0-1)	Markievicz Park, Sligo; Referee: B Cassidy

07/04/13; Round 7	Meath	2-12 - 0-14	Fermanagh	Páirc Tailteann, Navan; Referee: P O'Sullivan
07/04/13; Round 7	M Newman (1-5), P Gilsenan (1-1), S Bray (0-3), G Reilly (0-2), E Wallace (0-1)		T Corrigan (0-8), R Jones (0-2), T McElroy (0-2), M McGrath (0-1), P Ward (0-1)	Páirc Tailteann, Navan; Referee: P O'Sullivan

07/04/13; Round 7	Cavan	1-7 - 2-14	Roscommon	Breffni Park, Cavan; Referee: F Kelly
07/04/13; Round 7	M Dunne (1-0), G McKiernan (0-2), M Reilly (0-2), C Mackey (0-1), E Keating (0-1), N McDermott (0-1)		D Smith (0-6), D O'Gara (2-0), C Cregg (0-3), D Keane (0-1), D Keenan (0-1), E Smith (0-1), K Higgins (0-1), K Mannion (0-1)	Breffni Park, Cavan; Referee: F Kelly

=== Division 3 final ===
28/04/13	Monaghan	2-16 - 3-8	Meath	Croke Park, Dublin; Referee: P O'Sullivan
28/04/13	E Duffy (1-3), C McManus (0-5), K Hughes (1-1), P Finlay (0-3), O Lennon (0-2), C McGuinness (0-1), D Hughes (0-1)	Report	M Newman (1-2), S Bray (1-1), D Dalton (1-0), C Lenehan (0-2), B Menton (0-1), E Wallace (0-1), P Gilsenan (0-1)	Croke Park, Dublin; Referee: P O'Sullivan

== Division 4 ==
=== Table ===
Compete in Division 4 final and automatic promotion to Division 3

Team	Pld	W	D	L	F	A	Diff	Pts
Limerick	7	6	0	1	2-72	2-65	7	12
Offaly	7	5	0	2	10-71	4-68	21	10
Tipperary	7	4	0	3	6-88	6-73	15	8
Clare	7	4	0	3	4-84	7-65	10	8
Leitrim	7	3	0	4	7-80	7-77	3	6
Waterford	7	3	0	4	8-66	5-81	-6	6
Carlow	7	2	0	5	2-78	5-89	-20	4
London	7	1	0	6	5-61	8-82	-30	2

^{1}Tipperary are placed ahead of Clare because they won the head-to-head game between the teams (1-13 to 0-10).

=== Rounds 1 to 7 ===
03/02/13; Round 1	Limerick	0-11 - 0-9	Leitrim	Gaelic Grounds, Limerick; Referee: D O'Mahoney
03/02/13; Round 1	E O'Connor (0-7), J O'Meara (0-2), P Kinnerk (0-1), S Lavin (0-1)		E Mulligan (0-5), A Croal (0-1), G Hickey (0-1), K Conlon (0-1), P Brennan (0-1)	Gaelic Grounds, Limerick; Referee: D O'Mahoney

03/02/13; Round 1	London	1-5 - 1-13	Offaly	Emerald GAA Grounds, Ruislip; Referee: M Condon
03/02/13; Round 1	P McGoldrick (1-2), S Kelly (0-2), E O'Neill (0-1)		P Cunningham (0-5), A Sullivan (1-2), B Allen (0-4), E Carroll (0-1), G Guilfoyle (0-1)	Emerald GAA Grounds, Ruislip; Referee: M Condon

03/02/13; Round 1	Clare	0-11 - 1-9	Waterford	Cusack Park, Ennis; Referee: P O'Sullivan
03/02/13; Round 1	D Tubridy (0-5), S McGrath (0-2), A Clohessy (0-1), C Dunning (0-1), C O'Connor (0-1), M McMahon (0-1)		D Guiry (1-1), P Whyte (0-3), R Aherne (0-2), C McGrath (0-1), P Hurney (0-1), S Aherne (0-1)	Cusack Park, Ennis; Referee: P O'Sullivan

03/02/13; Round 1	Tipperary	0-16 - 1-14	Carlow	Semple Stadium, Thurles; Referee: P Fox
03/02/13; Round 1	B Grogan (0-5), A Maloney (0-4), B Fox (0-3), G Hannigan (0-2), C Sweeney (0-1), L McGrath (0-1)		P Reid (1-1), Brian Murphy (0-3), D Foley (0-3), E Ruth (0-2), W Minchin (0-2), Brendan Murphy (0-1), T Bolger (0-1)	Semple Stadium, Thurles; Referee: P Fox

09/02/13; Round 2	Waterford	2-8 - 0-9	Tipperary	Fraher Field, Dungarvan; Referee: A Nolan
09/02/13; Round 2	P Whyte (1-4), R Ahearne (1-1), D Guiry (0-1), P Hurney (0-1), T Grey (0-1)		B Grogan (0-4), B Fox (0-1), C Sweeney (0-1), G Hannigan (0-1), M Quinlivan (0-1), P Acheson (0-1)	Fraher Field, Dungarvan; Referee: A Nolan

10/02/13; Round 2	Leitrim	2-8 - 1-14	Clare	Páirc Seán Mac Diarmada, Carrick-on-Shannon; Referee: P Neilan
10/02/13; Round 2	E Mulligan (1-4), C Beirne (1-0), W McKeon (0-2), D Beck (0-1), P McGowan (0-1)		D Tubridy (1-5), G Brennan (0-2), S McGrath (0-2), C O'Connor (0-1), G Kelly (0-1), M McCarthy (0-1), P McMahon (0-1), R Donnelly (0-1)	Páirc Seán Mac Diarmada, Carrick-on-Shannon; Referee: P Neilan

10/02/13; Round 2	Offaly	1-8 - 0-12	Limerick	O'Connor Park, Tullamore; Referee: S Hehir
10/02/13; Round 2	B Connor (1-2), N McNamee (0-4), A Sullivan (0-1), G Guilfoyle (0-1)		I Ryan (0-5), B Scanlon (0-2), S Lavin (0-1)	O'Connor Park, Tullamore; Referee: S Hehir

16/02/13; Round 2	Carlow	0-13 - 1-9	London	Dr. Cullen Park, Carlow; Referee: K O'Brien
16/02/13; Round 2	D Foley (0-3), A Kelly (0-2), Brian Murphy (0-2), E Ruth (0-2), Brendan Murphy (0-1), D Hayden (0-1), R Walker (0-1), W Minchin (0-1)		P McGoldrick (0-5), C McCallion (1-1), E O'Neill (0-2), J Monaghan (0-1)	Dr. Cullen Park, Carlow; Referee: K O'Brien

02/03/13; Round 3	Waterford	0-6 - 0-8	Limerick	Fraher Field, Dungarvan; Referee: J Hickey
02/03/13; Round 3	G Hurney (0-5), G Nugent (0-1)		I Ryan (0-4), E O'Connor (0-1), G Collins (0-1), J Riordan (0-1), S Buckley (0-1)	Fraher Field, Dungarvan; Referee: J Hickey

03/03/13; Round 3	Offaly	2-5 - 0-13	Clare	O'Connor Park, Tullamore; Referee: B O'Shea
03/03/13; Round 3	N McNamee (1-1), B Darby (1-0), A Mulhall (0-1), B Connor (0-1), R Brady (0-1), R Dalton (0-1)		D Tubridy (0-6), S McGrath (0-2), A Clohessy (0-1), C Dunning (0-1), E Coughlan (0-1), G Brennan (0-1), S Ryan (0-1)	O'Connor Park, Tullamore; Referee: B O'Shea

03/03/13; Round 3	Tipperary	2-12 - 1-8	London	Semple Stadium, Thurles; Referee: M Meade
03/03/13; Round 3	C Sweeney (1-1), G Hannigan (1-1), B Grogan (0-3), A Moloney (0-2), P Acheson (0-2), B Fox (0-1), D Lowry (0-1), H Coghlan (0-1)		P McGoldrick (1-5), L Colfer (0-2), G Crowley (0-1)	Semple Stadium, Thurles; Referee: M Meade

03/03/13; Round 3	Carlow	0-12 - 1-16	Leitrim	Dr. Cullen Park, Carlow; Referee: N Ward
03/03/13; Round 3	Brian Murphy (0-5), D Foley (0-2), E Ruth (0-2), Brendan Murphy (0-1), K Nolan (0-1), S Redmond (0-1)		E Mulligan (0-8), J Clancy (1-2), G Hickey (0-2), B Brennan (0-1), C Reynolds (0-1), P Brennan (0-1), R Cox (0-1)	Dr. Cullen Park, Carlow; Referee: N Ward

09/03/13; Round 4	London	0-14 - 1-10	Waterford	Emerald GAA Grounds, Ruislip; Referee: B Rice
09/03/13; Round 4	C McGee (0-3), L Mulvey (0-3), P McGoldrick (0-3), C Doyle (0-1), C McCallion (0-1), L Colfer (0-1), M Gottsche (0-1), S Hannon (0-1)		G Hurney (0-4), R Aherne (1-1), P Whyte (0-3), J Hurney (0-1), P Hurney (0-1)	Emerald GAA Grounds, Ruislip; Referee: B Rice

09/03/13; Round 4	Clare	0-10 - 1-13	Tipperary	Cusack Park, Ennis; Referee: D Maher
09/03/13; Round 4	D Tubridy (0-3), G Brennan (0-2), S McGrath (0-2), A Clohessy (0-1), C O'Connor (0-1), E Coughlan (0-1)		B Grogan (0-8), A Maloney (0-4), H Coghlan (1-0), P Acheson (0-1)	Cusack Park, Ennis; Referee: D Maher

10/03/13; Round 4	Limerick	0-10 - 0-9	Carlow	Gaelic Grounds, Limerick; Referee: M Condon
10/03/13; Round 4	I Ryan (0-7), B Scanlon (0-1), T Lee (0-1)		D Foley (0-3), M Doyle (0-2), B Kavanagh (0-1), Brian Murphy (0-1), K Nolan (0-1), W Minchin (0-1)	Gaelic Grounds, Limerick; Referee: M Condon

10/03/13; Round 4	Leitrim	0-8 - 0-9	Offaly	Páirc Seán Mac Diarmada, Carrick-on-Shannon; Referee: S Hurson
10/03/13; Round 4	E Mulligan (0-5), J Glancy (0-1), S McWeeney (0-1), W McKeon (0-1)		A Mulhall (0-2), B Connor (0-2), B Darby (0-1), J Maher (0-1), N McNamee (0-1), P Cunningham (0-1), R Brady (0-1)	Páirc Seán Mac Diarmada, Carrick-on-Shannon; Referee: S Hurson

16/03/13; Round 5	Offaly	2-11 - 1-11	Carlow	O'Connor Park, Tullamore; Referee: A Nolan
16/03/13; Round 5	J Maher (0-4), B Connor (1-0), S Pender (1-0), W Mulhall (0-2), A Mulhall (0-1), B Darby (0-1), G Guilfoyle (0-1), K Casey (0-1), N McNamee (0-1)		Brendan Murphy (0-3), Brian Murphy (0-3), D Foley (0-3), J Murphy (1-0), E Ruth (0-1), P Reid (0-1)	O'Connor Park, Tullamore; Referee: A Nolan

16/03/13; Round 5	Limerick	0-9 - 0-15	Tipperary	Gaelic Grounds, Limerick; Referee: D Brazil
16/03/13; Round 5	E O'Connor (0-2), G Collins (0-2), I Ryan (0-2), J Riordan (0-1), L O'Dwyer (0-1), S O'Carroll (0-1)		B Grogan (0-5), B Fox (0-2), C Sweeney (0-2), M Quinlivan (0-2), P Acheson (0-2), G Hannigan (0-1), L McGrath (0-1)	Gaelic Grounds, Limerick; Referee: D Brazil

16/03/13; Round 5	Leitrim	3-14 - 3-7	Waterford	Páirc Seán Mac Diarmada, Carrick-on-Shannon; Referee: E McHugh
16/03/13; Round 5	E Mulligan (0-7), R Cox (2-1), C Beirne (1-2), E Williams (0-2), B Brennan (0-1), C Reynolds (0-1)		T Grey (1-2), G Hurney (0-4), D Guiry (1-0), S Aherne (0-1)	Páirc Seán Mac Diarmada, Carrick-on-Shannon; Referee: E McHugh

24/03/13; Round 6	Carlow	0-9 - 1-12	Clare	Dr. Cullen Park, Carlow; Referee: J Curley
24/03/13; Round 6	Brian Murphy (0-4), Brendan Murphy (0-2), D Foley (0-2), S Gannon (0-1)		D Tubridy (0-5), R Donnelly (1-2), G Brennan (0-2), C Dunning (0-1), M McCarthy (0-1), S McGrath (0-1)	Dr. Cullen Park, Carlow; Referee: J Curley

24/03/13; Round 6	Tipperary	2-15 - 0-14	Leitrim	Semple Stadium, Thurles; Referee: L Devanney
24/03/13; Round 6	B Grogan (2-3), A Maloney (0-4), M Quinlivan (0-2), P Acheson (0-2), A Matassa (0-1), B Fox (0-1), C Sweeney (0-1), P Codd (0-1)		E Mulligan (0-6), C Beirne (0-2), C Clarke (0-1), G Hickey (0-1), P Brennan (0-1), R Cox (0-1), S McWeeney (0-1), T Beirne (0-1)	Semple Stadium, Thurles; Referee: L Devanney

24/03/13; Round 6	Waterford	1-11 - 2-15	Offaly	WIT Sports Campus, Waterford; Referee: M Meade
24/03/13; Round 6	G Hurney (0-4), T Grey (0-3), R Ahearne (0-2), D Hallahan (0-1), T Prendergast (0-1)		K Casey (0-8), G Guilfoyle (1-3), B Connor (1-0), N McNamee (0-2), A McNamee (0-1), W Mulhall (0-1)	WIT Sports Campus, Waterford; Referee: M Meade

24/03/13; Round 6	London	1-8 - 1-9	Limerick	Emerald GAA Grounds, Ruislip; Referee: R McBrien
24/03/13; Round 6	L Colfer (1-2), E O'Neill (0-3), M Gottsche (0-2), S Kelly (0-1)		I Ryan (0-4), J Riordan (1-1), E O'Connor (0-3), G Collins (0-1)	Emerald GAA Grounds, Ruislip; Referee: R McBrien

30/03/13; Round 6	Clare	2-14 - 0-8	London	Cusack Park, Ennis; Referee: J Hickey
30/03/13; Round 6	D Tubridy (0-7), G Brennan (1-1), R Donnelly (1-1), M McCarthy (0-2), G Quinlan (0-1), J Keane (0-1), S McGrath (0-1)		L Colfer (0-2), L Mulvey (0-2), C Magee (0-1), C McCallion (0-1), E O'Neill (0-1), G Mitchell (0-1)	Cusack Park, Ennis; Referee: J Hickey

07/04/13; Round 7	Leitrim	1-11 - 1-9	London	Páirc Seán Mac Diarmada, Carrick-on-Shannon; Referee: P Fox
07/04/13; Round 7	E Mulligan (0-5), C Beirne (1-0), R Lowe (0-2), C Reynolds (0-1), J Glancy (0-1), R Cox (0-1), T Beirne (0-1)		L Mulvey (1-3), P McGoldrick (0-3), C Magee (0-1), S Hannon (0-1), S Kelly (0-1)	Páirc Seán Mac Diarmada, Carrick-on-Shannon; Referee: P Fox

07/04/13; Round 7	Carlow	0-10 - 0-15	Waterford	Dr. Cullen Park, Carlow; Referee: N Ward
07/04/13; Round 7	Brian Murphy (0-6), C Moran (0-2), J Kennedy (0-1), J Murphy (0-1)		B Wall (0-4), P Hurney (0-3), G Hurney (0-2), N Walsh (0-1), R Aherne (0-1), S Aherne (0-1), S O'Hare (0-1)	Dr. Cullen Park, Carlow; Referee: N Ward

07/04/13; Round 7	Offaly	2-10 - 1-8	Tipperary	O'Connor Park, Tullamore; Referee: M McNally
07/04/13; Round 7	N McNamee (2-1), K Casey (0-3), A Sullivan (0-2), B Connor (0-2), B Darby (0-1), G Guilfoyle (0-1)		A Maloney (1-3), B Grogan (0-2), C Sweeney (0-2), R Costigan (0-1)	O'Connor Park, Tullamore; Referee: M McNally

07/04/13; Round 7	Clare	0-10 - 1-13	Limerick	Cusack Park, Ennis; Referee: J Henry
07/04/13; Round 7	G Brennan (0-4), I McInerney (0-3), M O'Shea (0-2), M McCarthy (0-1)		I Ryan (1-5), S Buckley (0-3), E O'Connor (0-2), G Collins (0-2), I Corbett (0-1)	Cusack Park, Ennis; Referee: J Henry

=== Division 4 final ===
28/04/13	Limerick	0-16 - 1-11	Offaly	Croke Park, Dublin; Referee: C Branagan
28/04/13	I Ryan (0-5), D O'Connor (0-2), S Lavin (0-2), E O'Connor (0-1), I Corbett (0-1), J Riordan (0-1), S Buckley (0-1), S Lucey (0-1), S O'Carroll (0-1), T Lee (0-1)	Report	K Casey (0-4), N McNamee (0-4), R Brady (1-0), B Connor (0-2), B Darby (0-1)	Croke Park, Dublin; Referee: C Branagan

== Statistics ==
- All scores correct as of 26 March 2016

=== Scoring ===
- Widest winning margin: 15
  - Derry 2-17 - 1-5 Westmeath (Division 2)
- Most goals in a match: 8
  - Monaghan 5-13 - 3-10 Wicklow (Division 3)
- Most points in a match: 33
  - Armagh 0-21 - 1-12 Galway (Division 2)
  - Westmeath 0-17 - 0-16 Armagh (Division 2)
- Most goals by one team in a match: 5
  - Monaghan 5-13 - 3-10 Wicklow (Division 3)
- Highest aggregate score: 47 points
  - Monaghan 5-13 - 3-10 Wicklow (Division 3)
- Lowest aggregate score: 14 points
  - Waterford 0-6 - 0-8 Limerick (Division 4)

=== Top scorers ===
Overall

Rank	Player	County	Tally	Total	Matches	Average
1	Bernard Brogan	Dublin	2-38	44	6	7.3
1	Sean McCormack	Longford	4-32	44	7	6.3
3	Emlyn Mulligan	Leitrim	1-40	43	7	6.1
3	Mickey Newman	Meath	4-31	43	7	6.1
5	Donal O'Hare	Down	2-35	41	7	5.9
6	Conor McManus	Monaghan	2-32	38	7	5.4
6	John Heslin	Westmeath	2-32	38	7	5.4
8	Michael Murphy	Donegal	1-34	37	7	5.3
9	James Kielt	Derry	3-27	36	8	4.5
9	Adrian Marren	Sligo	2-30	36	7	5.1
9	Barry Grogan	Tipperary	2-30	36	7	5.1
12	Ian Ryan	Limerick	1-32	35	7	5
13	David Tubridy	Clare	1-31	34	7	4.9
14	Shane Lennon	Louth	3-20	29	6	4.8
15	Stephen O'Neill	Tyrone	3-19	28	8	3.5

Single game

Rank	Player	County	Tally	Total	Opposition
1	Bernard Brogan	Dublin	1-10	13	Mayo
1	Conor McManus	Monaghan	2-7	13	Wicklow
3	Sean McCormack	Longford	1-7	10	Westmeath
3	John Heslin	Westmeath	1-7	10	Laois
3	Sean McCormack	Longford	2-4	10	Galway
6	Michael Murphy	Donegal	0-9	9	Kildare
6	Donal O'Hare	Down	0-9	9	Cork
6	Donal O'Hare	Down	0-9	9	Mayo
6	Mickey Newman	Meath	1-6	9	Antrim
6	Barry Grogan	Tipperary	2-3	9	Leitrim
6	Gavin McParland	Armagh	3-0	9	Wexford

Preceded by 2012 National Football League	National Football League; 1926–present	Succeeded by 2014 National Football League
