= Eddie Kinsella =

Gaelic football referee

Eddie Kinsella is a former Gaelic football referee from County Laois. He is a member of the Courtwood club.

Kinsella refereed the 2014 All-Ireland Senior Football Championship Final between Donegal and Kerry at Croke Park. Before this he had refereed one Leinster SFC final, one Munster SFC final, the 2011 All-Ireland Under 21 final and the 2014 All-Ireland Senior Club Football Championship final.

Kinsella retired at the end of 2016.
