= List of All-Ireland Senior Football Championship medal winners =

This is a list of footballers who have received a winners' medal in the All-Ireland Senior Football Championship.

Currently, the Gaelic Athletic Association issues 26 medals to the winning team, however, the individual county board have the option of ordering extra medals for members of the extended panel or for players who may have played during the championship but missed the final due to injury.

Player	No.	Team(s)	Championships	Notes
Stephen Cluxton	1	Dublin	2015	
Johnny Cooper	1	Dublin	2015	
Rory O'Carroll	1	Dublin	2015	
Philly McMahon	1	Dublin	2015	
James McCarthy	1	Dublin	2015	
Cian O'Sullivan	1	Dublin	2015	
Jack McCaffrey	1	Dublin	2015	
Brian Fenton	1	Dublin	2015	
Denis Bastick	1	Dublin	2015	
Paul Flynn	1	Dublin	2015	
Diarmuid Connolly	1	Dublin	2015	
Ciarán Kilkenny	1	Dublin	2015	
Paddy Andrews	1	Dublin	2015	
Dean Rock	1	Dublin	2015	
Bernard Brogan	1	Dublin	2015	
Michael Savage	1	Dublin	2015	Won a medal as a non-playing substitute in 2015
Tomas Brady	1	Dublin	2015	Won a medal as a non-playing substitute in 2015
Alan Brogan	1	Dublin	2015	
David Byrne	1	Dublin	2015	Won a medal as a non-playing substitute in 2015
Cormac Costello	1	Dublin	2015	Won a medal as a non-playing substitute in 2015
Darren Daly	1	Dublin	2015	
Michael Fitzsimons	1	Dublin	2015	
Eric Lowndes	1	Dublin	2015	Won a medal as a non-playing substitute in 2015
Michael Darragh MacAuley	1	Dublin	2015	
Kevin McManamon	1	Dublin	2015	
John Small	1	Dublin	2015	
Brian Kelly	1	Kerry	2014	
Marc Ó Sé	1	Kerry	2014	
Aidan O'Mahony	1	Kerry	2014	
Fionn Fitzgerald	1	Kerry	2014	
Paul Murphy	1	Kerry	2014	
Peter Crowley	1	Kerry	2014	
Killian Young	1	Kerry	2014	
Anthony Maher	1	Kerry	2014	
David Moran	1	Kerry	2014	
Stephen O'Brien	1	Kerry	2014	
Johnny Buckley	1	Kerry	2014	
Donnchadh Walsh	1	Kerry	2014	
Paul Geaney	1	Kerry	2014	
Kieran Donaghy	1	Kerry	2014	
James O'Donoghue	1	Kerry	2014	
Brendan Kealy	1	Kerry	2014	Won a medal as a non-playing substitute in 2014
Shane Enright	1	Kerry	2014	
Michael Geaney	1	Kerry	2014	Won a medal as a non-playing substitute in 2014
Declan O'Sullivan	1	Kerry	2014	
Barry John Keane	1	Kerry	2014	
Bryan Sheehan	1	Kerry	2014	
Darren O'Sullivan	1	Kerry	2014	
Kieran O'Leary	1	Kerry	2014	
Jonathan Lyne	1	Kerry	2014	Won a medal as a non-playing substitute in 2014
Mark Griffin	1	Kerry	2014	Won a medal as a non-playing substitute in 2014
P Kilkenny	1	Kerry	2014	Won a medal as a non-playing substitute in 2014
