= List of Kerry inter-county footballers =

This is a very incomplete list of Gaelic footballers who have played at senior level for the Kerry county team.

== List of players ==
=== B ===
- Eamonn Breen: Retired 1999
- Mike Breen

=== C ===
- David Clifford
- Paudie Clifford
- Colm Cooper
- Peter Crowley: Until 2021, league debut in 2011, championship debut in 2012

=== D ===
- Kieran Donaghy: 2005–2018, 69 championship appearances

=== E ===
- John Egan
- Shane Enright: 10 years, until 2020

=== F ===
- Maurice Fitzgerald
- Éamonn Fitzmaurice: Until 2007
- Jason Foley

=== G ===
- Paul Galvin: 12 years, until 2014
- Paul Geaney

=== K ===
- Brendan Kealy
- Brian Kelly: Until 2020
- Tim Kennelly

=== L ===
- Bomber Liston
- Jonathan Lyne: Until 2020, league debut v Cork in 2011

=== M ===
- Anthony Maher: 2008–2018
- David Moran
- Ogie Moran
- Tadhg Morley
- Seamus Moynihan: 14 years, until 2006

=== O ===
- Mick O'Connell
- Joe O'Connor
- James O'Donoghue: Until 2022
- Declan O'Keeffe: 1995–2007, debut v Donegal in National League
- Aidan O'Mahony: until 2017, 70 championship appearances and 85 league appearances
- Brian Ó Beaglaoich
- Marc Ó Sé
- Páidí Ó Sé
- Tomás Ó Sé
- Jack O'Shea
- Seán O'Shea
- Darran O'Sullivan: 14 years until 2018, championship debut in 2005
- Declan O'Sullivan: until 2014
- Graham O'Sullivan
- Tom O'Sullivan

=== P ===
- Ger Power

=== R ===
- Shane Ryan

=== S ===
- Bryan Sheehan: 2005–2017, scored 6–161 in 66 championship appearances
- Mikey Sheehy
- Killian Spillane
- Mick Spillane
- Pat Spillane
- Tom Spillane

=== W ===
- Donnchadh Walsh: 2003–2018
- Tommy Walsh: Until 2021
- Gavin White
