= Christopher Conway =

Christopher or Chris Conway may refer to

- Chris Conway (footballer, born 1928), Scottish footballer, see List of Bury F.C. players (25–99 appearances)
- Chris Conway (born c. 1978), Gaelic footballer
