= Diarmuid O'Donoghue =

Irish Gaelic footballer

Personal information
- Born: County Kerry, Ireland

Sport
- Sport: Gaelic football
- Position: Forward
Club
- Years: Club
- Killarney Legion
Inter-county
Years	County	Apps (scores)
1980-1984	Kerry	1 (0-01)
Inter-county titles
- Munster titles: 4 (as a sub)
- All-Irelands: 3 (as a sub)
- NFL: 1

Diarmuid O'Donoghue was a Gaelic footballer from Killarney, County Kerry. He played with the Kerry senior team during the 1980s.

== Club ==
He played his club football with the Killarney Legion club and Killarney divisional team. He was part of the 1983 Kerry Senior Football Championship winning team with the latter. He also won an East Kerry Senior Football Championship in 1976.

== Minor ==
O'Donoghue first lined out with Kerry at minor level in 1976. He had little success as Kerry lost out to Cork in the Munster final.

== Under 21 ==
He moved to the Under 21 team straight out of the minor grade. He made his first appearance in the 1978 All-Ireland semi-final win over Louth.

He played in the 1979 Munster Quarter-final loss to Cork at Left Half Forward scoring a point.

He was again Left Half Forward in 1980 when Kerry had a surprise loss to Limerick in the Munster Quarter-final.

== Junior ==
He lined out with the Kerry Junior team in 1983. He won a Munster Junior Football Championship after a win over Cork where he scored three points. After overcoming Dublin in the Home All-Ireland final, Kerry faced Yorkshire. He scored four points in a 0-15 to 0-02 win to pick up an All-Ireland medal.

== Senior ==
He joined the senior team during the 1979–80 National Football League where he played in three games. He was part of the panel for the championship winning Munster and All-Ireland titles without playing any games.

He made four appearances during the 1980–81 National Football League.

He made a handful of appearances during the next few League campaigns.

He was made captain of the Kerry for the 1983–84 National Football League campaign. He played in all bar one of Kerry's finishing as top scoring with 4-14 from nine games. Despite failing to score in the final Kerry took the title with O'Donoghue as captain.

He made his first and only championship appearance in the Munster semi-final win over Tipperary.

He make a few more League appearances over the coming seasons, his last being during the 1985–86 National Football League.

== Personal life ==
His son James played with Kerry at all levels from Minor and Senior level. He was an All-Ireland winning in 2014, as well as a two time All-Star and the 2014 Footballer of the Year.
