= Sean Hegarty =

Irish Gaelic footballer

Personal information
- Born: County Kerry, Ireland

Sport
- Sport: Gaelic football
- Position: Half back
Club
- Years: Club
- Killarney Legion
Inter-county
- Years: County
- 2001: Kerry

Sean Hegarty was a Gaelic footballer from County Kerry, Ireland. He had a brief career with the Kerry senior team during the 2001 National League. Before joining the senior team he played with the Kerry minor team in 1997 and won a Munster Championship title playing at center back. He then moved on to the Under 21 side in 1998 and won a Munster Championship, and later an All Ireland Championship. He won a second Munster Under 21 title in 1999 but lost in the All Ireland final to Westmeath. In 2006 he was captain of the Kerry Junior team that won Munster and All Ireland titles.

At club level he played with the Killarney Legion club with whom he won a County Intermediate Championship in 2005.

He also played with the Tralee IT team that won the Sigerson Cup in 1999.
