= Peter O'Leary (Kerry Gaelic footballer) =

Irish Gaelic footballer

Personal information
- Born: County Kerry, Ireland

Sport
- Sport: Gaelic football
- Position: Goalkeeper
Club
- Years: Club
- Killarney Legion
Inter-county
Years	County	Apps (scores)
1991-2001	Kerry	6 (0-00)
Inter-county titles
- Munster titles: 6
- All-Irelands: 1
- NFL: 1

Peter O'Leary was a Gaelic football goalkeeper from Killarney, County Kerry. He played with the Kerry senior team and Legion.

== Club ==
He played his club football with the Killarney Legion club and had great success. During his playing days Legion became one of the top clubs in Kerry winning a County League Div 1 title in 1993 and a club championship title in 1994 with O'Leary part of the team. In 2005 he helped his team win the Kerry Intermediate Football Championship for the first time.

== Minor ==
He joined the Kerry minor team in 1987. His side qualified for the Munster final after wins over Waterford and Limerick, in the final Kerry faced Cork. O'Leary and co lost out after a re-play.

He was underage again for the minor team in 1988. Wins over Waterford, Limerick and Cork seen him win a Munster title. Kerry later faced Dublin in the All-Ireland final, a 2-05 to 0-05 win seen O'Leary win an All-Ireland medal.

== Under 21 ==
He later joined the Under 21 team where he had more success. He first joined the team in 1989 when Kerry lost out to Cork in the first round.

He was underage again in 1990, where he played in all of Kerry's games as a win over Cork in the Munster final. In the final O'Leary and co faced Ulster champions Tyrone. Goals proved to be the difference as The Kingdom hit the Ulster men for 5, in a 5-12 to 2-11 win. It gave O'Leary an All-Ireland Under 21 title as well as being the team's captain.

He was underage again in 1991 and had more success. A win over Cork seen O'Leary pick up a second Munster Under-21 Football Championship. A win over Meath in the All-Ireland semi-final seen O'Leary and co back in the All-Ireland final. It was a repeat of the 1990 final as Kerry faced Tyrone. While goals won it for Kerry the year before it was the other way around this time as Tyrone hit Kerry for 4 in a 4-16 to 1-05 loss for O'Leary's side.
