= Killarney Legion GAA =

Gaelic sports club in County Kerry, Ireland

Killarney Legion
- An Léigúin, Cill Airne
- Founded: 1929
- County: Kerry
- Colours: Green & White
- Grounds: Dereen, Killarney
- Coordinates: 52°04′24.53″N 9°30′26.88″W

Playing kits
Standard colours

Senior Club Championships
	All Ireland	Munster champions	Kerry champions
Football:	-	-	1

Killarney Legion are a Gaelic Athletic Association club from Killarney in County Kerry, Ireland. The club was founded on a March evening in 1929 when a group of eleven men held a meeting in the then Temperance Hall in High Street, Killarney.

== History ==
In the Kerry Senior Football Championship, Legion reached the 3rd round by beating John Mitchels of Tralee 0-16 to 1-6, then losing to rivals Dr. Crokes 1-16 to 0-9. Legion now have a new state of the art clubhouse and have just commenced the development of a stand aligning the southern side of the main pitch. The stature of the juvenile section of the club is at an all-time high at present. Legion's U14 team represented Kerry in the Feile competition of 2006 held in Wicklow and again in 2009 held in Kildare. Also the minor teams (U18) have reached three county finals in a row since 2007, winning two. The club won the Under 21 Club Championship in 2011 and 2012. Legion's senior team was relegated to Division 2 for the 2014 season, but won that straight away. Killarney Legion GAA came so close to winning the County Championship 2015 after beating Mid Kerry, Feale Rangers, Kerins O' Rahillys and Rathmore. Legion met South Kerry in the County Final but lost in extra time of a replay.

As of October 2020, the club acquired a new floodlighting system, and upgraded the gym.

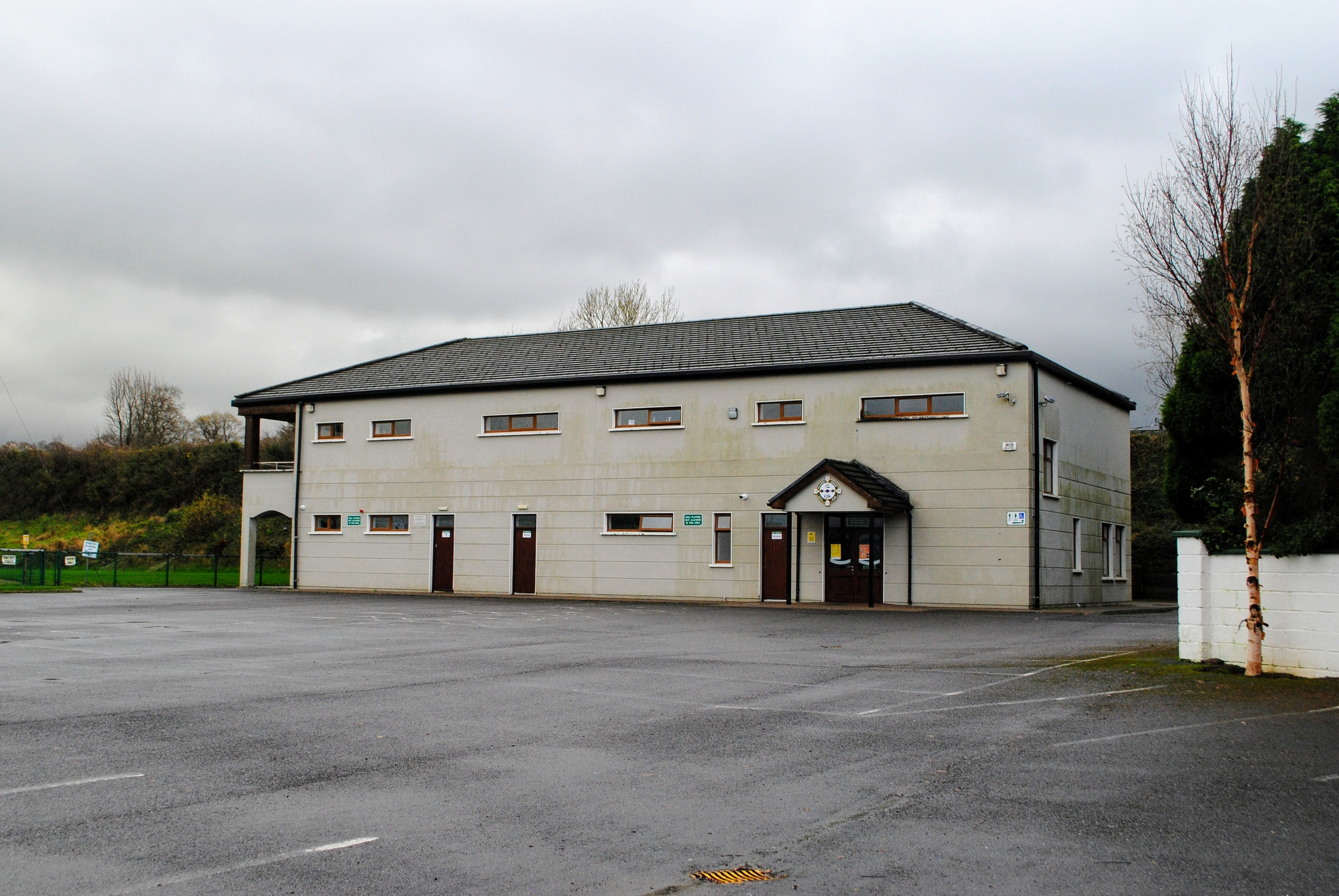
The Killarney Legion clubhouse

== Notable players ==
Notable players include:

- Brian Kelly - Kerry GAA goalkeeper
- Jonathan Lyne - Kerry GAA wing-back
- James O'Donoghue - Kerry GAA Senior Centre forward

All-Ireland medal winners from the Legion include:

=== All-Ireland Senior Football Championship ===
- Ml. Coffey 1926
- D. O'Connor 1929-32
- Timmy O'Leary 1937-39
- Ml. Lyne 1937-41
- Jackie Lyne 1946-53
- Denny Lyne 1946
- Donie Murphy 1953
- Mixie Palmer 1953-55
- Gerald O'Sullivan 1953-55
- J. J. Sheehan 1953-55
- Johnny Culloty 1955-59-62-69(c)-70
- Diarmuid O'Donoghue 1980-84
- Peter O'Leary 1997, 2000
- John Cronin 2004
- Brian Kelly 2014
- Jonathan Lyne 2014
- James O'Donoghue 2014

=== All-Ireland Junior Football Championship ===
- Ml. Coffey 1924
- Ml. Lyne 1941
- Denny Lyne 1941
- Teddy Lyne 1941
- John Murphy 1941
- J. C. Cooper 1949
- Mixie Palmer 1949
- om Spillane 1954
- Johnny Culloty 1954
- Weeshie Fogarty 1967
- Diarmuid O'Donoghue 1983
- Padraig Brosnan 1983
- Sean Hegarty 2006 (Captain)
- Pádraig O’Connor 2019

=== All-Ireland Under-21 Football Championship ===
- Denny Murphy 1975
- Padraig Brosnan 1976
- Peter O'Leary 1990
- Sean Hegarty 1998

=== All-Ireland Minor Football Championship ===
- Timmy O'Leary 1931-32-33
- Ml. Lyne 1933
- Johnny Brien 1946
- Donie Murphy 1946
- J. J. Sheehan 1946
- Marcus O'Neill 1950
- Tim Kelliher 1963
- Padraig Brosnan 1975
- Paudie Sheehan 1975
- Richard O'Brien 1980
- Peter O'Leary 1988
- Cian Gammell 2017
- Darragh Lyne 2018
- Kieran O'Donoghue 2018

=== All-Ireland Senior Club Football Championship ===
(with East Kerry)

- Ml. Lyne (Faugh) 1971
- Noel Power 1971
- Weeshie Fogarty 1971
- Johnny Culloty 1971

=== National Football League ===
- D. O'Connor 1928-29-30
- Johnny Culloty 1958-60-61-63-69-71
- Peter O'Leary 1997
- Diarmuid O'Donoghue 1984
- John Cronin 2004

=== Railway Cup Football ===
- D. O'Connor 1931
- Jackie Lyne 1946-48-49
- Tom Spillane 1949

=== All-Ireland Junior Hurling Championship ===
- Johnny Culloty 1961

=== All-Ireland Colleges Hogan Cup ===
- Donie Murphy
- J. J. Sheahan
- Pat Lucey with Munster 1947
- Tommy Leahy with St. Brendan's 1969
- Denis Doodey, Donal O'Leary, Darren Counihan, Ted Bowler

=== Universities Sigerson Cup ===
- Jackie Lyne U.C.C. 1943
- John Trant U.C.G. 1948-50
- Donie Murphy U.C.G. 1948
- John Keane U.C.C. 1988 (Captain)
- Sean Hegarty Tralee IT 1999
- Brian Kelly University College Cork 2014
- Shaun Keane University College Cork 2014

== Roll of honour ==
- Kerry Senior Football Championship: (1) 1946 Runners-Up 2015
- County Club Championship: (1) 1994 Runners-Up 2013, 2014
- Kerry Intermediate Football Championship: (1) 2005
- Kerry County Football League - Division 1: (1) 1993
- East Kerry Senior Football Championship: (6) 1929, 1954, 1955, 1967, 1976, 2019 Runners-Up 1958, 1959, 1960, 1961, 1962, 1984, 2013, 2014, 2015, 2017, 2023
- East Kerry Senior League Title: (7) 1933, 1936, 1943, 1944, 1947, 1950, 1953
- East Kerry Junior Football Championship: (2) 1980, 2014
- East Kerry Junior League Titles:(6) 1932, 1934, 1946, 1954, 1974, 1976.
