= Peter Crowley (Gaelic footballer) =

Kerry Gaelic footballer

Personal information
- Born: 22 May 1990 (age 36) County Kerry, Ireland
- Occupation: Pharmacist
- Height: 1.82 m (6 ft 0 in)

Sport
- Sport: Gaelic football
- Position: Centre Back
Club
- Years: Club
- 2007–: Laune Rangers
College
- Years: College
- UCC
College titles
- Sigerson titles: 1
Inter-county
Years	County	Apps (scores)
2012–2021	Kerry	13 (0-3)
Inter-county titles
- Munster titles: 5
- All-Irelands: 1
- NFL: 1
- All Stars: 1

Peter Crowley (born 22 May 1990) is an Irish sportsperson. He plays Gaelic football with his local club Laune Rangers. Crowley was a member of the Kerry county football team at senior level between 2012 and 2021, and was on the 2014 All-Ireland Senior Football Championship winning team. He retired from inter-county football in April 2021.

== Early and personal life ==
From Killorglin, Crowley attended the Intermediate School Killorglin. He is a pharmacist by trade.

== Career ==
Crowley played club football with Laune Rangers in the Mid Kerry Senior Football Championship. While at university, he played with UCC and won a Sigerson Cup medal and a Cork Senior Football Championship medal in 2011. He also won an Munster Minor Football Championship medal.

Joining the senior Kerry county football team in 2012, Crowley was a member of Kerry's successful 2014 All-Ireland Senior Football Championship team. After coming on as a substitute in Kerry's defeat of Cork in the 2014 Munster Senior Football Championship final, he started at the centre half back position in the 2014 All-Ireland final. Following Kerry's win over Donegal in the final, Crowley was recognised with an All-Star award for the 2014 football season.

Crowley was a member of the Kerry team that won the 2017 National Football League, and he also represented Ireland in the 2017 International Rules Series.

While he was a member of the panel that reached the 2019 National Football League division 1 final, he did not participate in the 2019 championship season due to injury.

Crowley announced his retirement from inter-county football in April 2021, due to "injury problems and work commitments".
