= James O'Donoghue =

Kerry Gaelic footballer

Personal information
- Native name: Séamus Ó Donnchú (Irish)
- Born: 19 June 1990 (age 36) Tralee, County Kerry, Ireland
- Occupation: Bank official
- Height: 1.8 m (5 ft 11 in)

Sport
- Sport: Gaelic football
- Position: Left corner
Club
- Years: Club
- Killarney Legion
Club titles
- Kerry titles: 1
College
- Years: College
- 2008–2013: University of Limerick
College titles
- Sigerson titles: 0
Inter-county*
Years	County	Apps (scores)
2010–2022	Kerry	40 (11–105)
Inter-county titles
- Munster titles: 9
- All-Irelands: 1
- NFL: 3
- All Stars: 2
- *Inter County team apps and scores correct as of 17:08, 21 February 2022.

James O'Donoghue (born 19 June 1990) is an Irish Gaelic footballer who plays for Kerry SFC club Killarney Legion. He is a former player at senior level for the Kerry county team.

== Career ==
Born in Killarney, County Kerry, O'Donoghue's father, Diarmuid, won two All-Ireland medals with the Kerry senior football team under Mick O'Dwyer. He first came to prominence at juvenile and underage levels with the Killarney Legion club, while also enjoying Corn Uí Mhuirí success with St. Brendan's College. O'Donoghue first appeared on the inter-county scene as a member of the Kerry minor football team that won the Munster Minor Championship in 2008. His two seasons with the under-21 team yielded little in terms of success before making his senior team debut during the 2010 National League. O'Donoghue made a combined total of 76 league and championship appearances and was named Footballer of the Year in 2014, having earlier helped Kerry to the All-Ireland Championship title. His other honours include nine Munster Championships and three National League titles. O'Donoghue announced his inter-county retirement in January 2022.

== Personal life ==
O'Donoghue did a Level 7 Sports and Exercise Course at the University of Limerick between 2008 and 2013. He became a Qualified Financial Advisor in Banking and Financial Support Services after doing a course at IOB (a recognised college of University College Dublin) between 2015 and 2018. He worked as a bartender in Dan Linehans Bar between November 2004 and January 2015. He began working as a mortgage advisor for Allied Irish Banks in February 2015.

== Career statistics ==
Team	Year	National League			Munster		All-Ireland		Total	
Team	Year	Division	Apps	Score	Apps	Score	Apps	Score	Apps	Score
Kerry	2010	Division 1	2	0-00	0	0-00	0	0-00	2	0-00
Kerry	2011	Division 1	0	0-00	1	0-01	2	0-01	3	0-02
Kerry	2012	Division 1	6	0-05	2	0-03	4	1-08	12	1-16
Kerry	2013	Division 1	6	1-05	3	1-08	1	2-03	10	4-16
Kerry	2014	Division 1	6	0-07	1	0-10	4	4-14	11	4-31
Kerry	2015	Division 1	7	2-21	3	1-03	3	0-10	13	3-34
Kerry	2016	Division 1	0	0-00	1	0-04	2	0-06	3	0-10
Kerry	2017	Division 1	3	0-10	2	0-16	3	0-07	8	0-33
Kerry	2018	Division 1	1	0-00	2	0-07	3	1-02	6	1-09
Kerry	2019	Division 1	3	0-02	1	1-01	2	0-01	6	1-04
Kerry	2020	Division 1	2	0-05	0	0-00	—		2	0-05
Kerry	2021	Division 1	0	0-00	0	0-00	—		0	0-00
Total			36	3-55	16	3-53	24	8-52	76	14-160

== Honours ==
St Brendan's College

- Corn Uí Mhuirí: 2008

East Kerry

- Kerry Senior Football Championship: 2022

Killarney Legion

- East Kerry Senior Football Championship: 2019

Kerry

- All-Ireland Senior Football Championship: 2014
- Munster Senior Football Championship: 2010, 2011, 2013, 2014, 2015, 2016, 2017, 2018, 2019
- National Football League 2017, 2020, 2021
- Munster Minor Football Championship: 2008

Awards

- GAA/GPA Footballer of the Year: 2014
- All Stars: 2013, 2014
- The Sunday Game Player of the Year: 2014
