= Chris Conway =

Laois Gaelic footballer

Personal information
- Born: County Laois

Sport
- Sport: Gaelic football
- Position: Corner forward
Club
- Years: Club
- Arles/Kilcruise
Club titles
- Laois titles: 1
- Leinster titles: 0
Inter-county
- Years: County
- To 2007: Laois
Inter-county titles
- Leinster titles: 1

Chris Conway is a Gaelic football coach and player from County Laois.

He plays for the Arles-Kilcruise club. He formerly played at centre forward for Laois and in 2003 was part of the Laois team that won the Leinster Senior Football Championship title for the first time since 1946, before departing the inter-county scene after the 2006 season.

Conway emerged on to the scene in 1996 as part of the Laois minor team that won the All-Ireland Minor Football Championship title.

In 2003 his club Arles-Kilcruise won the Laois Senior Football Championship title under the captaincy of his brother, Paudge.

Conway also had a coaching role with Knockbeg College, where he is a schoolteacher, and guided his "alma mater" to a 2005 All-Ireland Senior Colleges title.

Conway finished his inter-county career with the Laois football team at the end of the 2007 season.

He joined the Laois backroom team as a coach (alongside Brian "Beano" McDonald) under the management of Billy Sheehan, who was appointed manager in October 2021.
