= Donal Kingston =

Irish Gaelic footballer

Personal information
- Born: 12 August 1990 (age 36) Portlaoise, Ireland
- Height: 1.91 m (6 ft 3 in)

Sport
- Sport: Gaelic Football
- Position: Full Forward
Club
- Years: Club
- 2007-: Barrowhouse GAA Arles–Killeen
Inter-county*
Years	County	Apps (scores)
2008-	Laois	44 (7-158)
- *Inter County team apps and scores correct as of 28 July 2022.

Donal "Donie" Kingston (born 12 August 1990) is a Gaelic footballer from County Laois. He had played with Barrowhouse for a short while before being granted a transfer citing residential reasons, in which he transferred to senior club Arles–Killeen.

== Career statistics ==
As of 26 July 2022

Appearances and scores by team, season and competition
Team	Season	National League			Leinster		All-Ireland		Total	
Team	Season	Division	Apps	Score	Apps	Score	Apps	Score	Apps	Score
Laois	2008	Division 1			0	0-00	2	1-08	2	1-08
Laois	2009	Division 2			2	0-03	0	0-00	2	0-03
Laois	2010	Division 2	7	1-24	2	0-08	1	0-02	10	1-34
Laois	2011	Division 2	3	0-04	2	0-00	2	0-06	7	0-10
Laois	2012	Division 1			___________		___________		___________	
Laois	2013	Division 2			1	0-02	4	0-07	5	0-09
Laois	2014	Division 2	7	0-22	2	0-09	3	0-14	12	0-45
Laois	2015	Division 2	6	3-24	3	2-15	1	0-07	10	5-46
Laois	2016	Division 2	7	0-26	2	1-08	2	0-04	11	1-38
Laois	2017	Division 3	7	5-34	2	2-06	2	0-13	11	7-53
Laois	2018	Division 4	5	0-11	4	1-14	1	0-03	10	1-28
Laois	2019	Division 3			2	0-04	3	0-19	5	0-23
Laois	2020	Division 2			___________		___________		___________	
Laois	2021	Division 2			1	0-06	0	0-00	1	0-06
Laois	2022	Division 3			___________		___________		___________	
Total					23	6-75	21	1-83	44	7-158
