= Brendan Kealy =

Kerry Gaelic footballer

Personal information
- Native name: Breandán Ó Caolaí (Irish)
- Born: 1 January 1986 (age 40) Tralee, Ireland
- Occupation: Teacher
- Height: 1.83 m (6 ft 0 in)

Sport
- Sport: Gaelic football
- Position: Goalkeeper
Club
- Years: Club
- 2004–: Kilcummin
Inter-county*
Years	County	Apps (scores)
2010–2017	Kerry	28 (0-1)
Inter-county titles
- Munster titles: 7
- All-Irelands: 1
- NFL: 1
- All Stars: 1
- *Inter County team apps and scores correct as of 12:46, 13 July 2017.

Brendan Kealy (born 1 January 1986) is an Irish former Gaelic footballer who played as a goalkeeper at senior level for the Kerry county team.

== Career ==
Born in Killarney, County Kerry, Kealy first arrived on the inter-county scene at the age of seventeen when he first linked up with the Kerry minor team, before later joining the under-21 side. He made his senior debut during the 2010 National Football League. Kealy immediately became a regular member of the starting fifteen and has won three Munster medals on the field of play. He has been an All-Ireland runner-up on one occasion.

Kealy was a member of the Munster inter-provincial team on a number of occasions; however, he never won a Railway Cup medal. At club level he plays with Kilcummin.

Throughout his career Kealy made 28 championship appearances for Kerry.

Peter Keane brought Kealy in as goalkeeping coach of the Kerry senior team late in his tenure, while Keane's successor as manager Jack O'Connor (who had used Kealy as goalkeeping coach of the under-20 team) retained Kealy, so Kealy was there when the team won the 2022 All-Ireland Senior Football Championship Final.

== Honours ==
Kerry

- All-Ireland Senior Football Championship (1): 2014
- Munster Senior Football Championship (7): 2010, 2011, 2013, 2014, 2015, 2016, 2017
- National Football League (1): 2017
- Munster Minor Football Championship (2): 2003, 2004

Kilcummin

- Kerry Intermediate Football Championship (1) 2018 (c)
- Munster Intermediate Club Football Championship (1) 2018 (c)
- All-Ireland Intermediate Club Football Championship (1) 2019 (c)
