= 2014 All-Ireland Senior Football Championship =

Championship details
- Dates: 4 May — 21 September 2014
- Teams: 33 (includes London and New York)

All-Ireland Champions
- Winning team: Kerry (37th win)
- Captain: Fionn Fitzgerald; Kieran O'Leary
- Manager: Éamonn Fitzmaurice

All-Ireland Finalists
- Losing team: Donegal
- Captain: Michael Murphy
- Manager: Jim McGuinness

Provincial Champions
- Munster: Kerry
- Leinster: Dublin
- Ulster: Donegal
- Connacht: Mayo

Championship statistics
- Top Scorer: Cillian O'Connor (5–36)
- Player of the Year: James O'Donoghue

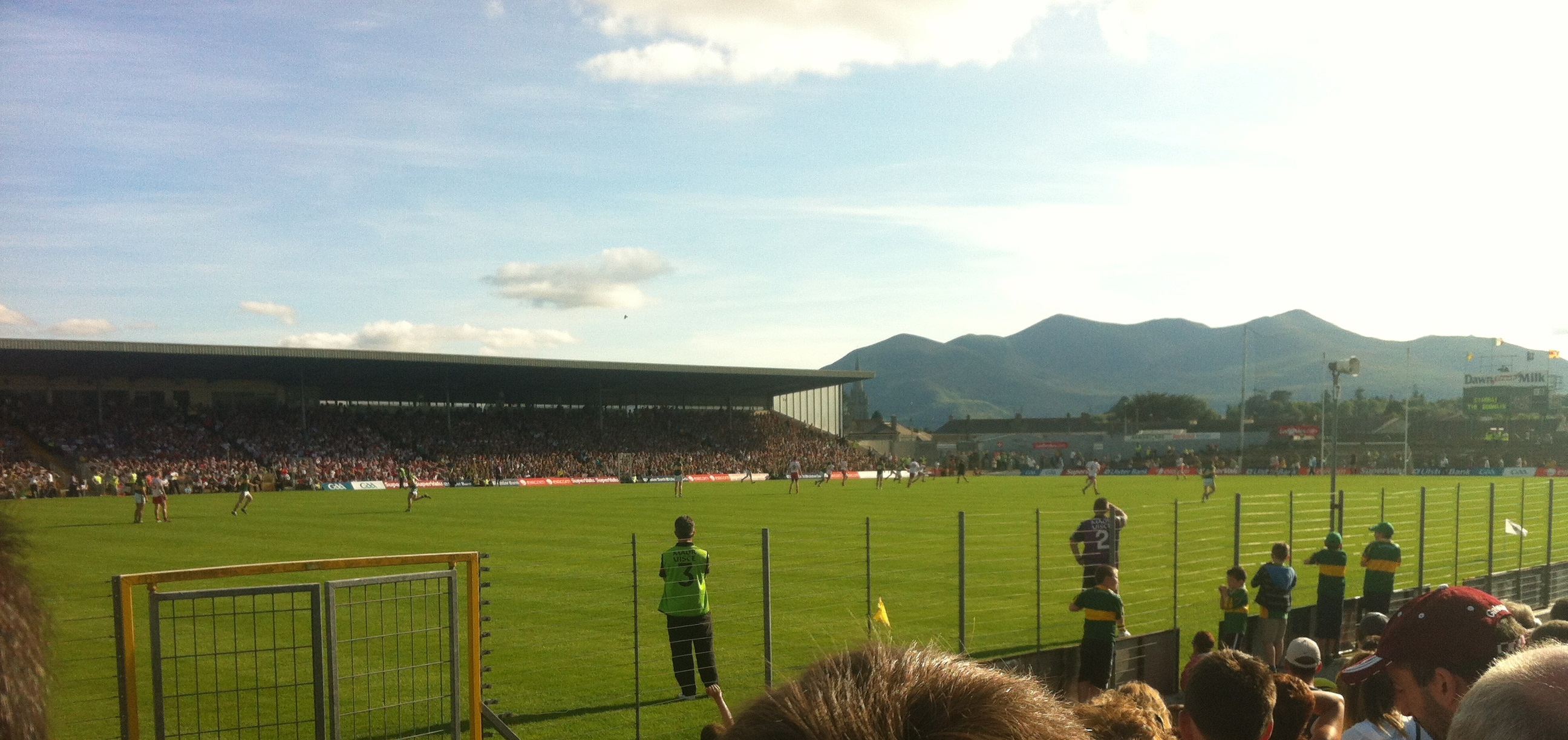
Fitzgerald Stadium in Killarney

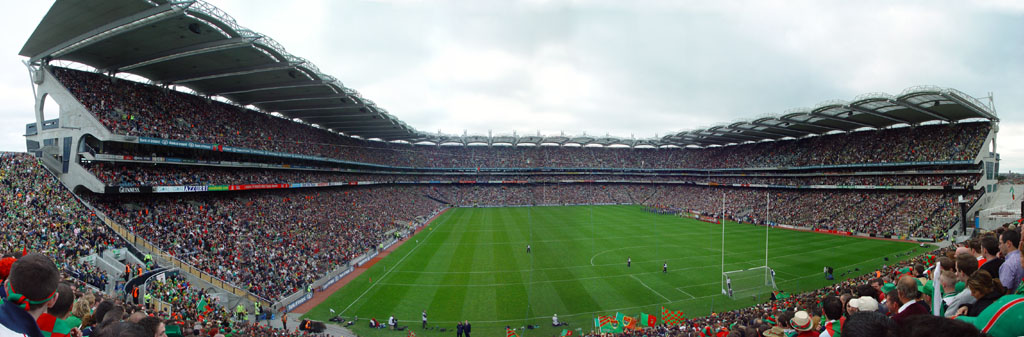
Croke Park in Dublin City

The 2014 All-Ireland Senior Football Championship was the 128th edition of the GAA's premier inter-county Gaelic football since its establishment in 1887. It was played between 31 counties of Ireland (excluding Kilkenny), London and New York.

Changes for 2014 included the introduction of black cards for "cynical" fouls, the addition of IPTV service GAAGO for international audiences and the broadcasting of live televised matches on Sky Sports for the UK audience.

The defending champions were Dublin who were beaten by Donegal in the semi-final. This led to the unexpected final pairing of Donegal and Kerry (victors over Mayo in their semi-final replay) – a first on All-Ireland Final day, and only a second meeting in Championship history. Their first Championship encounter, a 2012 quarter-final, led to victory for Donegal, who marched on to lay claim to that year's Sam Maguire Cup.

Kerry, with goals from Paul Geaney and Kieran Donaghy, won their 37th title after a 2–9 to 0–12 win against Donegal.

== Teams ==
A total of 33 teams contested the championship. These included 31 teams from Ireland, as well as London and New York. As in previous years, Kilkenny footballers decided not to field a team. New York did not participate in the qualifiers.

== Innovations and utilities ==
The inclusion of GAAGO and Sky Sports in the Championship season. See section on #Broadcasting rights. Central Council decided to defer the implementation of the clock/hooter until the 2015 championships.

== Stadia and locations ==
Team	Location	Stadium	Stadium capacity
Antrim	Belfast	Casement Park	32,500
Armagh	Armagh	Athletic Grounds	19,500
Carlow	Carlow	Dr Cullen Park	21,000
Cavan	Cavan	Kingspan Breffni Park	32,000
Clare	Ennis	Cusack Park	14,864
Cork	Cork	Páirc Uí Chaoimh	43,550
Derry	Derry	Celtic Park	22,000
Donegal	Ballybofey	MacCumhaill Park	18,000
Down	Newry	Páirc Esler	20,000
Dublin	Dublin	Parnell Park	13,500
Fermanagh	Enniskillen	Brewster Park	20,000
Galway	Galway; Tuam	Pearse Stadium; St Jarlath's Park	26,197; 25,000
Kerry	Killarney	Fitzgerald Stadium	43,180
Kildare	Newbridge	St Conleth's Park	6,200
Laois	Portlaoise	O'Moore Park	27,000
Leitrim	Carrick-on-Shannon	Páirc Seán Mac Diarmada	9,331

Team	Location	Stadium	Stadium capacity
Limerick	Limerick	Gaelic Grounds	49,866
London	Ruislip	Emerald GAA Grounds	5,000
Longford	Longford	Pearse Park	10,000
Louth	Drogheda	Drogheda Park	7,000
Mayo	Castlebar	MacHale Park	42,000
Meath	Navan	Páirc Tailteann	10,000
Monaghan	Clones	St Tiernach's Park	36,000
New York	Kingsbridge, Bronx	Gaelic Park	2,000
Offaly	Tullamore	O'Connor Park	20,000
Roscommon	Roscommon	Dr Hyde Park	18,500
Sligo	Sligo	Markievicz Park	18,558
Tipperary	Thurles	Semple Stadium	53,500
Tyrone	Omagh	Healy Park	26,500
Waterford	Waterford	Walsh Park	17,000
Westmeath	Mullingar	Cusack Park	11,000
Wexford	Wexford	Wexford Park	20,000
Wicklow	Aughrim	Aughrim County Ground	10,000

== Provincial championships ==
=== Connacht Senior Football Championship ===
Quarter-finals
New York	0-08
Mayo	4-18
Roscommon	1-18
Leitrim	0-13
London	0-07
Galway	3-17

Semi-finals
Mayo	0-13
Roscommon	1-09
Sligo	0-11
Galway	0-16

Final
Mayo	3-14
Galway	0-16

13 July 2014
2.00pm
Final

Mayo	3–14 – 0–16	Galway
C O'Connor (0-08), J Doherty, L Keegan (1-01 each), B Moran (1-00), K McLoughlin (0-03), A Dillon (0-01)	Report	S Walsh (0-07), P Conroy (0-04), S Armstrong (0-02), G Bradshaw, M Lundy, D Cummins (0-01 each)

McHale Park, Castlebar
Referee: R Hickey (Clare)

=== Leinster Senior Football Championship ===
Preliminary round
Wicklow	1-11
Laois	0-21
Longford	0-19
Offaly	0-15
Westmeath	1-09
Louth	1-14

Quarter-finals
Laois	0-16
Dublin	2-21
Longford	1-13
Wexford	1-15
Louth	1-07
Kildare	1-22
Carlow	0-06
Meath	7-13

Semi-finals
Dublin	2-25
Wexford	1-12
Kildare	0-17
Meath	2-16

Final
Dublin	3-20
Meath	1-10

20 July 2014
2.00pm
Final

Dublin	3–20 – 1–10	Meath
B Brogan (1-06), K McManamon (1-05), E O'Gara (1-01), J McCaffrey, C O'Sullivan, P Flynn, A Brogan, D Connolly, C Costello, D Rock, S Cluxton (0-01 each)	Report	M Newman (1-02), A Tormey, S Bray, S O'Rourke (0-02 each), D Carroll, D Bray (0-01 each)

Croke Park, Dublin
Attendance: 62,620
Referee: P Hughes (Armagh)

=== Munster Senior Football Championship ===
Quarter-finals
Limerick	1-11
Tipperary	2-14
Clare (R)	2-08; 3-11
Waterford (R)	2-08; 0-12

Semi-finals
Tipperary	1-11
Cork	0-16
Kerry	1-17
Clare	1-13

Final
Cork	0-12
Kerry	0-24

6 July 2014
2.00pm
Final

Cork	0–12 – 0–24	Kerry
D Goulding (0–06), B Hurley (0-04), A Walsh, F Goold (0-01 each)	Report	J O'Donoghue (0–10), J Buckley, B Sheehan (0-04 each), P Geaney (0-03), S O'Brien, D Walsh, Declan O'Sullivan (0-01 each)

Páirc Uí Chaoimh, Cork
Referee: C Reilly (Meath)

=== Ulster Senior Football Championship ===
Preliminary round
Tyrone (R)	2-11; 3-11
Down (R)	3-08; 0-12

Quarter-finals
Tyrone	0-14
Monaghan	1-12
Armagh	1-12
Cavan	0-09
Fermanagh	3-13
Antrim	2-18
Derry	0-11
Donegal	1-11

Semi-finals
Monaghan (R)	0-14; 1-18
Armagh (R)	0-14; 1-13
Antrim	0-12
Donegal	3-16

Final
Monaghan	1-09
Donegal	0-15

20 July 2014
4.00pm
Final

Monaghan	1–09 – 0–15	Donegal
P Finlay (0-04), C McGuinness (1-00), R Beggan (0-02), V Corey, K Hughes, C McManus (0-01 each)	Report	C McFadden (0-04), P McBrearty, O MacNiallais (0-03 each), M Murphy (0-02), A Thompson, K Lacey, R McHugh (0-01 each)

St Tiernach's Park, Clones
Referee: Maurice Deegan (Laois)

== All-Ireland Series ==
=== Qualifiers ===
==== Round 1 ====
The first round consisted of all teams that failed to reach their respective provincial semi-finals. 16 teams in total took part. The draw took place on Monday 9 June 2014 on RTÉ Radio 1.

2014 saw a new qualifying system implemented. The teams were split into groups A and B depending on which side of the draw they had played in their provincial championships. Each team was drawn to face an opponent from the same group as themselves, meaning A teams were paired with A teams and B teams were paired with B teams. Four games were instituted for each round, with Round 1A staged on 21 June and Round 1B taking place on 28 June.

Connacht (2)

- A London
- B Leitrim

Leinster (7)

- A Laois
- A Longford
- A Offaly
- A Wicklow
- B Carlow
- B Louth
- B Westmeath

Munster (2)

- A Limerick
- B Waterford

Ulster (5)

- A Derry
- A Fermanagh
- B Cavan
- B Down
- B Tyrone
21 June 2014
3.00pm
Round 1A

Limerick	1–16 – 1–13	London
I Ryan (0-08), G Hegarty (1-00), K Phair, G Collins, B Scanlon (0-02 each), J Galvin, D Neville (0-01 each)	Report	D Dunleavy (1-05) J Feeney (0-02), A Faherty, M Gottsche, M Miskelly, L Mulvey, S Hickey, T Gaughan (0-01 each)

Gaelic Grounds, Limerick
Referee: P O'Sullivan (Kerry)

21 June 2014
3.30pm
Round 1A

Laois	1–19 – 2–15	Fermanagh
D Kingston (0-06), R Munnelly (0-04), B Sheehan (1-00), D Strong (0-03), C Meredith (0-02), K Meaney, C Begley, P Begley, D Conway (0-01 each)	Report	S Quigley (2-08), E Maguire (0-02), N Cassidy, B Owens, R Jones, R Corrigan, P McCusker (0-01 each)

O'Moore Park, Portlaoise
Referee: David Coldrick (Meath)

21 June 2014
5.00pm
Round 1A

Derry	2–14 – 2–16	Longford
M Lynch (1-04), B Heron (1-01), J Kielt (0-04), E Lynn, T O'Brien (0-02 each), SL McGoldrick (0-01)	Report	P Barden (1-02), S McCormack (0-04), M Hughes (1-00), B Kavanagh (0-03), F McGee, M Quinn (0-02 each), B Gilleran, S Mulligan, C Smyth (0-01 each)

Celtic Park, Derry
Referee: M Higgins (Fermanagh)

21 June 2014
7.00pm
Round 1A

Wicklow	3–12 – 0–17	Offaly
S Furlong (2-02), L Glynn (0-04), D Hayden (1-00), A Murphy (0-02), D Healy, J McGrath, A McLoughlin, J Stafford (0-01 each)	Report	N McNamee (0–10), J Maher (0-03), P Cunningham, J Moloney, N Smith, A Sullivan (0-01 each)

Aughrim County Ground, Aughrim
Referee: Conor Lane (Cork)

28 June 2014
2.30pm
Round 1B

Louth	0–10 – 2–21	Tyrone
R Burns (0-03), A McDonnell, B White, C Grimes (0-02 each), C Judge (0-01).	Report	D McCurry (0-06), S Cavanagh (0-05), E McKenna (1-01), N Morgan, C McAliskey (0-04 each), S O’Neill (1-00), C McGinley (0-01).

Healy Park, Omagh
Referee: M Duffy (Sligo)

28 June 2014
3.00pm
Round 1B

Cavan	1–15 – 1–14	Westmeath
N McDermott (1-02), M Lyng, J Brady (0-03 each), M Argue (0-02), J Hayes, R Maloney-Derham, G McKiernan, D Givney, E Keating (0–01 each)	Report	J Heslin (0-04), J Gilligan (1-00), C McCormack (0-03), Dessie Dolan, P Sharry, G Egan (0-02 each), K Martin (0-01)

Breffni Park, Cavan
Referee: P Hughes (Armagh)

28 June 2014
2.00pm
Round 1B

Carlow	0–17 – 1–13	Waterford
D St Ledger (0-04), C Coughlan, S Kinsella (0-03 each), B Kavanagh (0-02), K Nolan, E Ruth, M Meaney, D Foley, J Kennedy (0-01 each)	Report	P Whyte (0-08), L O’Lionain (1-02), S Briggs (0-02), T Prendergast (0-01)

Dr Cullen Park, Carlow
Referee: C Reilly (Meath) / P O'Sullivan (Kerry)

28 June 2014
2.00pm
Round 1B

Down	4–18 – 0–09	Leitrim
C Laverty (2-04), D O’Hare (0-04), N Madine, D Turley (1-00 each), B Coulter, M Poland, L Doyle (0-02 each), K McKernan, D Gordon, C Maginn, M Cunningham (0-01 each)	Report	E Mulligan (0-05), Gary Reynolds, S McWeeney, R Lowe, N Moore (0-01 each)

Páirc Esler, Newry
Referee: A Nolan (Wicklow)

==== Round 2 ====
The second round of the qualifiers featured the eight winning teams of Round 1A and Round 1B, along with the defeated teams from the provincial semi-finals. The draw saw each team from the previous qualifier round face a beaten semi-finalist, with the eight winners of these matches progressing to Round 3.

Round 1A Winners

- Laois
- Limerick
- Longford
- Wicklow

Round 1B Winners

- Carlow
- Cavan
- Down
- Tyrone

Connacht Semi-finalists

- Roscommon
- Sligo

Leinster Semi-finalists

- Kildare
- Wexford

Munster Semi-finalists

- Clare
- Tipperary

Ulster Semi-finalists

- Antrim
- Armagh
5 July 2014
2.00pm
Round 2A

Limerick	3–11 – 0–15	Antrim
G Collins (2-00), I Ryan (0-04), D Tracey (1-00), J Galvin, K Phair (0-02 each), M O'Riordan, T Lee, G Hegarty (0-01 each)	Report	P Cunningham (0-07), P McCann (0-02), M McCann, N McKeever, M Sweeney, T McCann, R McGrady, P McBride (0-01 each)

Gaelic Grounds, Limerick
Referee: M Higgins (Fermanagh)

5 July 2014
4.45pm
Round 2A

Tipperary	2–17 – 0–06	Longford
C Sweeney (0-08), P Acheson (1-02), B Grogan (0-04), M Quinlivan (1-00), P Codd, B Mulvihill, C Kennedy (0-01 each)	Report	B Kavanagh (0-02), E Williams, M Quinn, P Barden, S McCormack (0-01 each)

Semple Stadium, Thurles
Referee: P O'Sullivan (Kerry)

5 July 2014
5.00pm
Round 2A

Wicklow	0–10 – 0–12	Sligo
S Furlong (0-04), J Stafford, A McLoughlin, R Finn, N Gaffney, D O'Sullivan, L Glynn (0-01 each)	Report	C Harrison, S Coen, A Marren, M Breheny (0-02 each), J Hynes, B Curran, D Kelly, A Devaney (0-01 each)

Aughrim County Ground, Aughrim
Attendance: 3,000
Referee: C Branagan (Down)

6 July 2014
2.00pm
Round 2A

Wexford	0–17 – 0–18	Laois
C Lyng (0-05), B Brosnan (0-04), PJ Banville (0-03), J Holmes (0-02), R Tierney, G Molloy, P Byrne (0-01 each)	Report	J O'Loughlin (0-04), D Kingston (0-04), N Donoher (0-03), MJ Tierney (0-02), C Begley, K Meaney, C Meredith, R Munnelly, D O'Connor (0-01 each)

Wexford Park, Wexford
Referee: A Nolan (Wicklow)

12 July 2014
6.00pm
Round 2B

Cavan	0–05 – 0–16	Roscommon
M Reilly (0-02), M Argue, E Keating, P Tinnelly (0-01 each)	Report	D Murtagh (0-05), E Smith (0-04), C Cregg (0-03), C Daly, D Smith (0-02 each)

Breffni Park, Cavan
Referee: Barry Cassidy (Derry)

13 July 2014
2.00pm
Round 2B

Down	0–11 – 1–18	Kildare
B Coulter (0-03), D O’Hare (0-03), D Rooney, D O’Hagan, K McKernan, C Maginn, C Laverty (0-01 each)	Report	P Fogarty (0-04), T Moolick (1-00), A Smith, P O’Neill (0-03 each), C McNally, N Kelly (0-02 each), E Bolton, G White, E Callaghan, E O’Flaherty (0-01 each)

Páirc Esler, Newry
Referee: David Coldrick (Meath)

13 July 2014
2.00pm
Round 2B

Carlow	2–13 – 4–26	Clare
D Bambrick, C Moran (1-00 each), P Broderick, C Coughlan, D St Ledger (0-02 each), B Kavanagh, J Kennedy, S Kinsella, M Meaney, W Minchin, E Ruth (0-01 each); K Hartnett (0-01 own point)	Report	R Donnelly (1-03), P McMahon (1-02), S Brennan (1-01), G Brennan, E Coughlan, D Tubridy (0-04 each), P Collins (1-00), E Cleary, S McGrath (0-03 each), S Collins (0-02)

Dr Cullen Park, Carlow
Referee: M Duffy (Sligo)

13 July 2014
3.00pm
Round 2B

Tyrone	0–10 – 0–13	Armagh
S Cavanagh (0-05), D McCurry (0-02), N Morgan, K Coney, N McKenna (0-01 each)	Report	T Kernan (0-04), J Clarke (0-03), A Kernan, S Harold, A Mallon, S Campbell, M Shields, R Grugan (0-01 each)

Healy Park, Omagh
Referee: C Reilly (Meath)

==== Round 3 ====
The third round of the qualifiers featured the eight winning teams of Round 2A and Round 2B. The draw saw each team from the previous qualifier round face each other, with the four winners of these matches progressing to Round 4.

Round 2A Winners

- Laois
- Limerick
- Sligo
- Tipperary

Round 2B Winners

- Armagh
- Clare
- Kildare
- Roscommon
12 July 2014
4.00pm
Round 3A

Sligo	0–12 – 0–10	Limerick
A Marren (0-03), S Coen (0-02), M Breheny (0-02), K Cawley, P Hughes, J Kilcullen, S McManus, A Devaney (0-01 each)	Report	I Ryan (0-03), G Collins, B Scanlon (0-02 each), K Phair, E Hanrahan, M Brosnan (0-01 each)

Markievicz Park, Sligo
Referee: F Kelly (Longford)

12 July 2014
4.45pm
Round 3A

Laois	4–09 – 3–17	Tipperary
D Kingston (0-04), D Conway (1-01), J O’Loughlin, C Meredith, J Finn (1-00 each), B Sheehan, N Donoher, E Costello, MJ Tierney (0-01 each)	Report	C Sweeney (2-02), B Grogan (1-03), P Austin (0-04), M Quinlivan (0-03), C O’Riordan, B Fox (0-02 each), P Acheson (0-01)

O'Moore Park, Portlaoise
Referee: David Gough (Meath)

19 July 2014
5.00pm
Round 3B

Roscommon	1–12 – 1–17	Armagh
D Murtagh (0-05), C Murtagh (1-00), K Higgins, E Smith, C Daly, C Shine, S Kilbride, D Smith, C Cregg (0-01 each)	Report	J Clarke, T Kiernan (0-04 each), S Forker 1-00, S Harold, K Carragher (0-02 each), A Mallon, A Findan, K Dyas, S Campbell, R Grugan (0-01 each)

Dr Hyde Park, Roscommon
Referee: Eddie Kinsella (Laois)

19 July 2014
7.00pm
Round 3B

Clare	0–12 – 0–13	Kildare
D Tubridy (0-04), G Brennan, S McGrath (0-02 each), M McMahon, E Coughlan, P Collins, R Donnelly (0-01 each)	Report	A Smith (0-06), E O'Flaherty (0-03), E Callaghan (0-02), P O'Neill, P Brophy (0-01 each)

Cusack Park, Ennis
Attendance: 7,000
Referee: Joe McQuillan (Cavan)

==== Round 4 ====
The fourth round of the qualifiers featured the four winning teams of Round 3A and Round 3B. The draw saw each team from the previous qualifier round face a provincial runner-up. The teams from Round 3A faced runners up from Connacht and Munster, while the teams from Round 3B faced those from Leinster and Ulster, with the four winners of these matches progressing to the All-Ireland Quarter Finals.

For the Round 4A games no draw was necessary as Sligo had already faced Galway, while Tipperary had previously played Cork. A similar situation occurred on the B side of the draw, with Armagh unable to meet Monaghan, and Kildare having played Meath previously.

Draw A

Round 3A Winners

- Sligo
- Tipperary

Provincial Runners-up

- Connacht: Galway
- Munster: Cork

Draw B

Round 3B Winners

- Armagh
- Kildare

Provincial Runners-up

- Leinster: Meath
- Ulster: Monaghan

26 July 2014
5.00pm
Round 4A

Cork	0–21 – 1–11	Sligo
C O’Neill (0–10), P Kerrigan (0-05), A Walsh (0-02), B Hurley, D Hodnett, I Maguire, D Cahalane (0-01 each)	Report	A Marren (0-06), S Coen (1-01), M Breheny (0-03), C Harrison (0-01)

O'Connor Park, Tullamore
Referee: David Gough (Meath)

26 July 2014
7.00pm
Round 4A

Galway	4–17 – 4–12	Tipperary
S Walsh (0-05), D Cummins, M Lundy (1-01 each), F Ó Curraoin, T Flynn (1-00 each), M Martin, P Conroy (0-03 each), S Armstrong (0-02), P Varley, D Comer (0-01 each)	Report	C Sweeney (1-04), C O’Riordan (1-02), B Fox, B Mulvihill (1-00 each), P Acheson (0-02), S O’Brien, B Grogan, M Quinlivan, G Hannigan (0-01 each)

O'Connor Park, Tullamore
Referee: Barry Cassidy (Derry)

2 August 2014
5.00pm
Round 4B

Meath	0–13 – 0–18	Armagh
M Newman (0-04), G Reilly (0-03), P O’Rourke, David Bray (0-02 each), D Carroll, A Tormey (0-01 each)	Report	T Kernan, A Forker, S Campbell (0-03 each), A Kernan, B Mallon (0-02 each), M Shields, K Dyas, K Carragher, J Clarke, S Forker (0-01 each)

Croke Park, Dublin
Referee: R Hickey (Clare)

2 August 2014
7.00pm
Round 4B

Monaghan	2–16 – 2–14 (AET)	Kildare
S Gollogly (1-03), C McManus (0-05), P Finlay (0-04), V Corey (1-00), D Wylie, F Kelly, D Hughes, J McCarron (0-01 each)	Report	E Bolton (2-01), E O’Flaherty (0-04), A Smith (0-03), P Fogarty (0-02), P O’Neill, H Lynch, E Callaghan, N Kelly (0-01 each)

Croke Park, Dublin
Referee: David Coldrick (Meath)

=== Quarter-finals ===
The quarter-finals featured the four provincial champions, along with the teams that progressed from Round 4 of the qualifiers. The teams from Round 4A were to face either the Connacht or Munster champions in the earlier games, while the following weekend saw the teams from Round 4B face the champions from Leinster and Ulster.

Teams coming from the qualifiers that had already met one of the provincial champions in an earlier match in the competition were automatically kept apart from that team. This made a draw unnecessary on the A side of the draw, Cork and Galway were prevented from facing Kerry and Mayo respectively. On the B side of the draw, Armagh had not met either of the teams and were able to play either Donegal or Dublin, but Monaghan's earlier game with Donegal meant that those two teams were kept apart, again making a draw unnecessary.

Quarter-finals
Kerry	1–20
Galway	2–10
Mayo	1–19
Cork	2–15
Donegal	1–12
Armagh	1–11
Dublin	2–22
Monaghan	0–11

Semi-finals
Kerry	3–16
Mayo	3–13
Donegal	3–14
Dublin	0–17

Final
Kerry	2–09
Donegal	0–12

3 August 2014
2.00pm
Quarter-final A

Kerry	1–20 – 2–10	Galway
J O'Donoghue (1-05), P Geaney (0-04, 1f), BJ Keane (0-03), D Walsh (0-02), J Buckley (0-02, 1f), M Geaney, Declan O'Sullivan, D Moran, K O’Leary (0-01 each)	Report	S Walsh (0-05, 3f), M Lundy (1-01), T Flynn (1-00), G Bradshaw (0-02), P Conroy, D Comer (0-01 each)

Croke Park, Dublin
Attendance: 37,866
Referee: Eddie Kinsella (Laois)

3 August 2014
4.00pm
Quarter-final A

Mayo	1–19 – 2–15	Cork
C O’Connor (0-05, 3f), A O’Shea (1-00), A Dillon (0-04), D Vaughan, S O'Shea, J Doherty, A Moran (0-02 each), L Keegan, K McLoughlin (0-01 each)	Report	B Hurley (1-04, 1f), C O'Neill (0-06, 4f), D O'Connor (1-02, 1f), F Goold (0–2), A Walsh (0-01, 1f)

Croke Park, Dublin
Attendance: 37,866
Referee: C Reilly (Meath)

9 August 2014
4.00pm
Quarter-final B

Donegal	1–12 – 1–11	Armagh
M Murphy (0-05), O MacNiallais (1-01), C McFadden (0-03), P McBrearty (0-02), N McGee (0-01)	Report	T Kernan (0-04), A Kernan (0-02), A Mallon, A Forker, S Campbell, K Carragher, M Murray (0-01 each); P Durcan (1-00 own goal)

Croke Park, Dublin
Attendance: 72,440
Referee: Joe McQuillan (Cavan)

9 August 2014
6.00pm
Quarter-final B

Dublin	2–22 – 0–11	Monaghan
B Brogan (1-06), D Connolly (1-02), A Brogan (0-03), E O'Gara, D Rock, P Flynn (0-02 each), J Cooper, K McManamon, S Cluxton, C Costello (0-01 each)	Report	C McManus (0-06), D Clerkin, K Hughes (0-02 each), R Beggan (0-01)

Croke Park, Dublin
Attendance: 72,440
Referee: M Duffy (Sligo)

=== Semi-finals ===
There was no draw for the semi-finals as the fixtures are pre-determined on a yearly rotation (which ensures that the provincial champions can only meet once every three years if they win their quarter finals). The pairings saw last years finalists Dublin and Mayo take on Donegal and Kerry respectively. Kerry became the first team to reach the 2014 final following a win in extra time in a replay at the Gaelic Grounds, while Donegal joined them the following day after seeing off the reigning champions Dublin by six points. The Kerry–Mayo replay was moved to Limerick because Croke Park had been booked for a college American football game between Penn State and UCF.

24 August 2014
3:30pm
Semi-final

Kerry	1–16 – 1–16	Mayo
J O'Donoghue (1-03), D Walsh, D Moran (0-02 each), P Geaney, S O'Brien, J Buckley, M Geaney, F Fitzgerald, P Murphy, P Crowley, K O'Leary, B Sheehan (0-01 each)	Report	C O'Connor (1-08), A Dillon (0-03), A Moran (0-02), J Doherty, L Keegan, C Boyle (0-01 each)

Croke Park, Dublin
Attendance: 52,495
Referee: David Coldrick (Meath)
30 August 2014
5:00pm
Semi-final replay

Kerry	3–16 – 3–13 (AET)	Mayo
J O'Donoghue (2-06), P Geaney (0-04), K Donaghy (1-00), BJ Keane, J Lynne (0-02 each), K Young, M O Se (0-01 each)	Report	C O'Connor (2-05), A Moran (1-01), J Doherty (0-03), D Vaughan, K McLoughlin, A Freeman, M Conroy (0-01 each)

Gaelic Grounds, Limerick
Attendance: 36,256
Referee: Cormac Reilly (Meath)

31 August 2014
3:30pm
Semi-final

Donegal	3–14 – 0–17	Dublin
R McHugh (2-02), C McFadden (1-03), M Murphy (0-03), P McBrearty (0-02), K Lacey, F McGlynn, O MacNiallais, R Kavanagh (0-01 each)	Report	D Connolly (0-05), P Flynn (0-04), B Brogan (0-03), A Brogan, P Andrews (0-02 each), P McMahon (0-01)

Croke Park, Dublin
Attendance: 81,500
Referee: Joe McQuillan (Cavan)

=== Final ===
21 September 2014
3:30pm
Final

Kerry	2-09 – 0–12	Donegal
Paul Geaney 1–2 (0-1f), Kieran Donaghy 1–2, Paul Murphy 0–1, Barry John Keane 0–2 (0-2f), Johnny Buckley 0–1, Bryan Sheehan 0–1 (0-1f).	Report	Michael Murphy 0–4 (0-3f), Colm McFadden 0–1 (0-1f), Odhrán Mac Niallais 0–1, Kark Lacey 0–1, Patrick McBrearty 0–2, Neil McGee 0–1, Dermot Molloy 0–1, Christy Toye 0–1

Croke Park, Dublin
Attendance: 82,184
Referee: Eddie Kinsella (Laois)

== Statistics ==
- All scores correct as of 21 September 2014

=== Miscellaneous ===
- The Munster football Championship was seeded for only the second time since 1990, previous was 2008.
- Tipperary win their first Munster championship game since 2003 against Limerick.
- The Kerry-Mayo All Ireland semi-final was replayed at the Gaelic Grounds in, Limerick, the first All-Ireland semi-final to be played outside Croke Park, Dublin, since 1983.

=== Scoring ===
- First goal of the championship:
  - Diarmuid O'Connor for Mayo against New York (Connacht quarter-final)
- Widest winning margin: 28 points
  - Carlow 0-06 – 7–13 Meath (Leinster quarter-final)
- Most goals in a match: 8
  - Galway 4–17 – 4–12 Tipperary (Qualifier Round 4A)
- Most points in a match: 39
  - Carlow 2-13 – 4-26 Clare (Qualifier Round 2B)
- Most goals by one team in a match: 7
  - Carlow 0-06 – 7–13 Meath (Leinster quarter-final)
- Highest aggregate score: 57 points
  - Carlow 2–13 – 4–26 Clare (Qualifier Round 2B)
- Lowest aggregate score: 21 points
  - Cavan 0-05 – 0–16 Roscommon (Qualifier Round 2B)
- Most goals scored by a losing team: 4
  - Laois 4-09 – 3–17 Tipperary (Qualifier Round 3A)
  - Galway 4–17 – 4–12 Tipperary (Qualifier Round 4A)

=== Top scorers ===
Season

	Name	Team	Tally	Total	Games	Average
1	Cillian O'Connor	Mayo	5–36	52	6	8.6
2	Shane Walsh	Galway	1–29	32	5	6.4
3	Conor Sweeney	Tipperary	4–19	31	5	6.2
4	Conor McManus	Monaghan	1–27	30	6	5.0
5	Tony Kernan	Armagh	0–25	25	7	3.6
6	James O'Donoghue	Kerry	4–24	36	5	7.2
7	Donie Kingston	Laois	0–23	23	5	5.6
7	Paul Geaney	Kerry	1–20	23	6	3.8
7	Bernard Brogan	Dublin	2–17	23	4	5.8
7	Seán Quigley	Fermanagh	3–14	23	2	11.5
11	Michael Murphy	Donegal	0–21	21	6	3.5
11	Ross Munnelly	Laois	0–21	21	5	4.3
12	Jamie Clarke	Armagh	0–20	20	7	2.9
12	Barry Grogan	Tipperary	2–14	20	5	4.0
14	Ian Ryan	Limerick	0–19	19	4	4.7
14	Darren McCurry	Tyrone	1–16	19	4	4.8
16	Paul Whyte	Waterford	1–15	18	3	6.0
16	Donal O'Hare	Down	1–15	18	4	4.5
16	Mickey Newman	Meath	4-06	18	3	6.0
19	Niall McNamee	Offaly	0–17	17	2	8.5
19	Sean McCormack	Longford	0–17	17	4	4.3
19	Seán Cavanagh	Tyrone	0–17	17	5	3.4
19	Diarmuid Connolly	Dublin	2–11	17	5	3.4

Single game

Rank	Player	Tally	Total	County	Opposition
1	Seán Quigley	2-08	14	Fermanagh	Laois
2	James O'Donoghue	2-06	12	Kerry	Mayo
3	Cillian O'Connor	2-05	11	Mayo	Kerry
3	Cillian O'Connor	1-08	11	Mayo	Kerry
3	Cillian O'Connor	2-05	11	Mayo	New York
3	Mickey Newman	3-02	11	Meath	Carlow
7	Niall McNamee	0–10	10	Offaly	Wicklow
7	James O'Donoghue	0–10	10	Kerry	Cork
7	Colm O'Neill	0–10	10	Cork	Sligo
7	Conor McManus	1-07	10	Monaghan	Armagh
7	Bernard Brogan	1-07	10	Dublin	Monaghan
7	Conor Laverty	2-04	10	Down	Leitrim
13	Ross Munnelly	0-09	9	Laois	Wicklow
13	Shane Walsh	1-06	9	Galway	London
13	Brian Neeson	1-06	9	Antrim	Fermanagh
13	Seán Quigley	1-06	9	Fermanagh	Antrim
13	Bernard Brogan	1-06	9	Dublin	Meath

== Broadcasting rights ==
In the first year of a deal running from 2014 until 2016, a total of 45 provincial and All-Ireland championship matches in hurling and football were broadcast live on television in Ireland. A total of 31 games were shown by RTÉ and 20 by Sky Sports for the first time, both All-Ireland Semi Final and Finals were shared coverage between the two broadcasters. TV3's six year-involvement with broadcasting games came to an end in 2013. Sky Sports also broadcast live the All-Ireland hurling and football semi-finals and finals along with RTÉ.

Rachel Wyse and Brian Carney were announced as presenters of Sky's coverage, with Dave McIntyre and Mike Finnerty as commentators. Analysts were Peter Canavan and Paul Earley.

Australia's terrestrial Seven Network broadcast all 45 Championship games.

In May, the GAA and RTÉ launched a new streaming service called GAAGO intended to stream championship games worldwide. The subscription-based service was available to fans everywhere in the world outside of the island of Ireland, including all the games broadcast in Ireland exclusively by Sky Sports. All 45 televised games from the football and hurling championships, as broadcast by both RTÉ and Sky were available to watch on GAAGO. For Great Britain, the games broadcast by Sky were only available through Sky. The price for a worldwide GAAGO 'Season Pass' was €110 while in Britain, the GB Pass was €60. A pay-per-game option is available for €10, and this rose to €14 for the quarter-final, semi-final and final stages of the championship.

== Awards ==
The Sunday Game Team of the Year

The Sunday Game team of the year was picked on 21 September, the night of the final. Kerry's James O'Donoghue was named as The Sunday Game player of the year.

- Paul Durcan (Donegal)
- Aidan O'Mahony (Kerry)
- Neill McGee (Donegal)
- Keith Higgins (Mayo)
- Paul Murphy (Kerry)
- Peter Crowley (Kerry)
- Colm Boyle (Mayo)
- David Moran (Kerry)
- Neil Gallagher (Donegal)
- Paul Flynn (Dublin)
- Diarmuid Connolly (Dublin)
- Ryan McHugh (Donegal)
- James O'Donoghue (Kerry)
- Michael Murphy (Donegal)
- Cillian O'Connor (Mayo)

All Star Team

The 2014 All Star team was named in October. Kerry's James O'Donoghue was named as the All Stars Footballer of the Year with Ryan McHugh of Donegal named the All Stars Young Footballer of the Year.

Pos.	Player	Team	Appearances
GK	Paul Durcan	Donegal	2
RCB	Paul Murphy	Kerry	1
FB	Neil McGee	Donegal	3
LCB	Keith Higgins	Mayo	3
RWB	James McCarthy	Dublin	1
CB	Peter Crowley	Kerry	1
LWB	Colm Boyle	Mayo	2
MD	Neil Gallagher	Donegal	2
MD	David Moran	Kerry	1
RWF	Paul Flynn	Dublin	4
CF	Michael Murphy	Donegal	2
LWF	Diarmuid Connolly	Dublin	1
RCF	Cillian O'Connor	Mayo	1
FF	Kieran Donaghy	Kerry	3
LCF	James O'Donoghue^{FOTY}	Kerry	2

Player has previously been selected.

County breakdown

- Kerry= 5
- Donegal= 4
- Dublin= 3
- Mayo= 3

List of nominees

== See also ==
- 2014 All-Ireland Minor Football Championship
- 2014 All-Ireland Under-21 Football Championship
