= David Moran (Gaelic footballer) =

Kerry Gaelic footballer

Personal information
- Native name: Daithí Ó Móráin (Irish)
- Born: 29 June 1988 (age 38) Tralee, Ireland
- Height: 1.91 m (6 ft 3 in)

Sport
- Sport: Gaelic football
- Position: Midfield
Clubs
- Years: Club
- 2005-2024 2024: Kerins O'Rahilly's → St Brendan's (Divisional)
Club titles
- Kerry titles: 1
Inter-county*
Years	County	Apps (scores)
2008–2022	Kerry	53 (1–23)
Inter-county titles
- Munster titles: 10
- All-Irelands: 3
- NFL: 3
- All Stars: 2
- *Inter County team apps and scores correct as of match played 24 July 2022.

David Moran (29 June 1988) is an Irish Gaelic footballer who plays for the Kerins O'Rahilly's club and at senior level for the Kerry county team.

He is the son of the former Kerry player and manager Denis "Ogie" Moran.

== Career ==
Moran played for Kerry in the 2006 All-Ireland Minor Football Championship. He won a Munster Minor Football Championship after overcoming Tipperary Morans side later made it to the All-Ireland where they faced Roscommon, despite being tipped to win Kerry lost out after a re-play.

He joined the county's under-21 team in 2007 but had a surprise loss to Clare

He was again part of the side in 2008. Wins over Limerick, Cork and Tipperary meant Moran won a Munster Under-21 Football Championship. Kerry later qualified for the All-Ireland final where they faced Kildare. Moran scored two points as Kerry won a first All-Ireland Under 21 Football Championship since 1998.

His last year at under-21 level was in 2009, when Kerry lost to Cork.

and played with the county in the All-Ireland Under-21 Football Championship. He was added to the Kerry senior squad for the 2008 National Football League and appeared in the first three games against Donegal, Tyrone and Derry. He won the 2008 All-Ireland Under-21 Football Championship with Kerry.

Moran has won three All Ireland Senior Football Championships with Kerry, notably across three different decades.

== Career statistics ==
As of match played 24 July 2022.

Team	Year	National League			Munster		All-Ireland		Total	
Team	Year	Division	Apps	Score	Apps	Score	Apps	Score	Apps	Score
Kerry	2008	Division 1			0	0-00	2	0-00	2	0-00
Kerry	2009	Division 1			2	0-01	2	0-00	4	0-01
Kerry	2010	Division 1			3	0-01	1	1-00	4	1-01
Kerry	2011	Division 1			0	0-00	0	0-00	0	0-00
Kerry	2012	Division 1			0	0-00	0	0-00	0	0-00
Kerry	2013	Division 1			0	0-00	2	0-01	2	0-01
Kerry	2014	Division 1			2	0-00	4	0-03	6	0-03
Kerry	2015	Division 1			2	0-00	3	0-00	5	0-00
Kerry	2016	Division 1			2	0-01	2	0-01	4	0-02
Kerry	2017	Division 1			1	0-01	3	0-02	4	0-03
Kerry	2018	Division 1			2	0-00	3	0-02	5	0-02
Kerry	2019	Division 1			2	0-01	5	0-04	7	0-05
Kerry	2020	Division 1			1	0-00	—		1	0-00
Kerry	2021	Division 1			3	0-03	1	0-00	4	0-03
Kerry	2022	Division 1			2	0-00	3	0-02	5	0-02
Career total					22	0-08	31	1-15	53	1-23

== Honours ==
Kerry

- All-Ireland Senior Football Championship (3): 2009, 2014, 2022
- Munster Senior Football Championship (10): 2010, 2013, 2014, 2015, 2016, 2017, 2018, 2019, 2021, 2022
- National Football League (5): 2009, 2017, 2020, 2021, 2022
- All-Ireland Under 21 Football Championship (1): 2008
- Munster Under-21 Football Championship (1): 2008
- Munster Minor Football Championship (1): 2006

Other

- All-Ireland Inter-Firm Senior Football Championship (1) 2007
- Munster Inter-Firm Senior Football Championship (1) 2007
- Kerry Inter-Firm Senior Football Championship (1) 2007

Individual

- GAA-GPA All Stars Awards (2): 2014, 2019
