= Brian Kelly (Gaelic footballer) =

Kerry Gaelic football goalkeeper

Personal information
- Native name: Brían Ó Ceallaigh (Irish)
- Nickname: Gino Ginelli
- Born: 22 January 1990 (age 36) Tralee, Ireland
- Height: 1.85 m (6 ft 1 in)

Sport
- Sport: Gaelic football
- Position: Goalkeeper
Club
- Years: Club
- 2007–: Killarney Legion
Club titles
- Kerry titles: 1
College
- Years: College
- UCC
College titles
- Sigerson titles: 1
Inter-county
Years	County	Apps (scores)
2012–2020	Kerry	6 (0–0)
Inter-county titles
- Munster titles: 2
- All-Irelands: 1
- NFL: 0
- All Stars: 0

Brian Kelly (born 22 January 1990) is an Irish sportsman. He plays Gaelic football with his local club Killarney Legion and was a member of the Kerry senior county team from 2012.

== Schools ==
Kelly played with St Brendan's College, Killarney with whom he won a Munster Colleges Corn Uí Mhuirí title in 2008. The school later qualified for the Hogan Cup final nut lost out to St Patrick's Academy, Dungannon in Croke Park.

== College ==
Kelly later attended University College Cork. He lined out with the UCC GAA club and won a Sigerson Cup title in 2014.

== Coaching ==
Kelly succeeded Brendan Kealy as Kerry's goalkeeping coach under the management of Jack O'Connor in 2024.
