= Jonathan Lyne =

Irish Gaelic footballer (born 1990)

Personal information
- Native name: Seán Ó Laighin (Irish)
- Born: 24 February 1990 (age 36) Tralee, Ireland
- Height: 1.83 m (6 ft 0 in)

Sport
- Sport: Gaelic football
- Position: Right half back
Club
- Years: Club
- 2007–: Killarney Legion
Club titles
- Kerry titles: 1
Inter-county*
Years	County	Apps (scores)
2012–2020	Kerry	9 (0-3)
Inter-county titles
- Munster titles: 2
- All-Irelands: 1
- NFL: 1
- All Stars: 0
- *Inter County team apps and scores correct as of 20 September 2015.

Jonathan Lyne (24 February 1990) is an Irish sportsperson. He plays Gaelic football with his local club Killarney Legion and was a member of the senior Kerry county team from 2014.

Lyne started at right half-back for Kerry in the 2015 All-Ireland Senior Football Championship Final defeat to Dublin.

He is a cousin of Pat Spillane. His younger brother Damien died suddenly in Killarney in 2020.

Lyne confirmed his retirement from inter-county football on 1 January 2021. Though he played often in 2020, he was not involved in the 2020 Munster Senior Football Championship semi-final defeat to Cork.
