= 2017 National Football League (Ireland) =

Gaelic football competition

League details
- Dates: 4 February to 9 April 2017
- Teams: 32

League champions
- Winners: Kerry (20th win)
- Captain: Fionn Fitzgerald
- Manager: Éamonn Fitzmaurice

League runners-up
- Runners-up: Dublin
- Captain: Stephen Cluxton
- Manager: Jim Gavin

Other division winners
- Division 2: Galway
- Division 3: Tipperary
- Division 4: Westmeath

The 2017 National Football League, known for sponsorship reasons as the Allianz Football League, was the 86th staging of the National Football League, an annual Gaelic football tournament for Gaelic Athletic Association county teams. Thirty-one county teams from the island of Ireland, plus London, compete. Kilkenny do not participate.

On 9 April 2017 Kerry won their 20th National League title, beating Dublin by 0-20 to 1-16 in the final. Dublin were the reigning champions and were bidding for their fifth successive title.

Eir Sport (formerly Setanta) and TG4 provided live coverage of the league on Saturday nights and Sunday afternoons respectively. RTÉ2 broadcast highlights programme Allianz League Sunday on Sunday evenings. TG4 broadcast the final of each division live.

== Format ==
=== League structure ===
The 2017 National Football League consists of four divisions of eight teams. Each team plays every other team in its division once, usually four home and three away or three home and four away. Two points are awarded for a win and one point for a draw.

Teams Displayed By Province
| Province | Division 1 | Division 2 | Division 3 | Division 4 | Total |
|---|---|---|---|---|---|
| Connacht | 2 | 1 | 1 | 1 | 5 |
| Leinster | 1 | 2 | 4 | 4 | 11 |
| Munster | 1 | 2 | 1 | 2 | 6 |
| Ulster | 4 | 3 | 2 | 0 | 9 |
| Britain | 0 | 0 | 0 | 1 | 1 |

=== Tie-breaker ===
If only two teams are level on league points -

- The team that won the head-to-head match is ranked first
- If this game was a draw, score difference (total scored minus total conceded in all games) is used to rank the teams
- If score difference is identical, total scored is used to rank the teams
- If still identical, a play-off is required

If three or more teams are level on league points, score difference is used to rank the teams.

=== Finals, promotions and relegations ===
==== Division 1 ====
Following the decision to abolish the National Football League semi finals for 2017, the top two teams in Division 1 contest the National Football League final. The bottom two teams are relegated to Division 2.

==== Division 2, Division 3 & Division 4 ====
The top two teams in Divisions 2, 3 and 4 are promoted and contest the finals of their respective divisions. The bottom two teams in Divisions 2 and 3 are relegated.

== Division 1 ==
=== Division 1 table ===
Qualify for Division 1 final Automatic relegation to Division 2

| Team | Pld | W | D | L | F | A | Diff | Pts |
|---|---|---|---|---|---|---|---|---|
| Dublin | 7 | 4 | 3 | 0 | 6-109 | 4-72 | 43 | 11 |
| Kerry | 7 | 3 | 2 | 2 | 6-103 | 7-87 | 13 | 8 |
| Donegal | 7 | 3 | 2 | 2 | 5-90 | 7-74 | 10 | 8 |
| Monaghan | 7 | 3 | 2 | 2 | 7-79 | 5-82 | 3 | 8 |
| Mayo | 7 | 4 | 0 | 3 | 3-90 | 4-90 | -3 | 8 |
| Tyrone | 7 | 3 | 1 | 3 | 3-87 | 4-81 | 3 | 7 |
| Cavan | 7 | 1 | 2 | 4 | 4-72 | 2-101 | -23 | 4 |
| Roscommon | 7 | 1 | 0 | 6 | 6-85 | 7-128 | -46 | 2 |

- Kerry, Donegal, Monaghan and Mayo are ranked by score difference.

=== Division 1 Rounds 1 to 7 ===
==== Division 1 Round 1 ====
| 4 February 2017 Round 1 | Mayo | 0-12 - 1-11 | Monaghan | Elverys MacHale Park, Castlebar |
| 19.00 | Cillian O'Connor 0-7 (0-5f), Evan Regan 0-2 (0-1f), Fergal Boland, Kevin McLoughlin, Alan Freeman 0-1 each. | Report | Conor McManus 0-6 (0-3f, 0-1 ’45), Darren Hughes 1-1, Rory Beggan (0-1f), Colin Walshe, Gavin Doogan, Thomas Kerr 0-1 each. | Attendance: 10,080; Referee: Conor Lane (Cork) |

| 5 February 2017 Round 1 | Cavan | 0-11 - 0-18 | Dublin | Kingspan Breffni Park, Cavan |
| 14.00 | Seanie Johnston 0-5 (0-2f), Niall McDermott (0-2f), Gerard Smith 0-2 each, John McCutcheon, Conor Madden 0-1 each. | Report | Dean Rock 0-7 (0-6f), James McCarthy and Niall Scully 0-2 each, Brian Fenton, Michael Darragh MacAuley, Ciarán Kilkenny, Kevin McManamon, Cormac Costello (0-1f), Jack McCaffrey, Jason Whelan 0-1 each. | Attendance: 16,331; Referee: Padraig O’Sullivan (Kerry); Man of the Match: Niall Scully |

| 5 February 2017 Round 1 | Donegal | 1-17 - 2-17 | Kerry | O'Donnell Park, Letterkenny |
| 14.00 | Michael Murphy 1-3 (1-0, pen, 0-3 frees), Patrick McBrearty 0-4 (0-3 frees), Ciarán Thompson 0-3, Darach O'Connor 0-2, Paul Brennan, Martin O'Reilly, Ryan McHugh, Eoin McHugh and Conor Gibbons 0-1 each. | Report | Paul Geaney 2-4 (0-2 frees), James O’Donoghue 0-3, Jack Savage 0-3 (0-1 free), Donnchadh Walsh 0-2, Tom O’Sullivan, David Moran, Jonathan Lyne, Paul Murphy and Jack Barry 0-1 each. | Referee: Maurice Deegan (Laois) |

| 5 February 2017 Round 1 | Tyrone | 0-18 - 1-9 | Roscommon | Healy Park, Omagh |
| 14.00 | Peter Harte (0-4, 3 frees), Ronan O'Neill (0-3, 3 frees), Darren McCurry (1 free, 1 '45), Niall Sludden, Mark Bradley (0-2 each), Colm Cavanagh, Tiernan McCann, Jonathan Munroe, Conor Meyler, Conall McCann (0-1 each). | Report | N Daly (1-0), Donie Smith, Fintan Cregg (0-3 each), John McManus, Niall Kilroy, Conor Devaney (0-1 each). | Attendance: 6,110; Referee: A Nolan (Wicklow) |

==== Division 1 Round 2 ====
| 11 February 2017 Round 2 | Dublin | 0-10 - 1-07 | Tyrone | Croke Park, Dublin |
| 19.00 | Dean Rock (0-6f), Ciarán Kilkenny, Brian Fenton, Philly McMahon, Jonny Cooper 0-1 each | Report | Niall Sludden 0-3, Aidan McCrory 1-0, Peter Harte 0-2 (0-2f), Conor Meyler, Declan McClure 0-1 each | Attendance: 28,305; Man of the Match: Niall Sludden |

| 11 February 2017 Round 2 | Kerry | 1-10 - 0-15 | Mayo | Austin Stack Park, Tralee |
| 19.00 | Cillian O'Connor (0-9f), Andy Moran 0-3, Tom Parsons, Kevin McLoughlin, Conor O'Shea 0-1 each | Report | B. J. Keane 1-3, Jack Barry, Paul Geaney (0-2f) 0-2 each, Jack Savage, Paul Murphy, Conor Geaney 0-1 each |

| 12 February 2017 Round 2 | Roscommon | 2-09 - 0-16 | Donegal | Dr Hyde Park, Roscommon |
| 14.00 | Ciaran Murtagh 1-4 (0-2 frees), Conor Devaney 1-0, Enda Smith, Kevin Higgins 0-2 each, Fintan Cregg 0-1 | Report | Ciarán Thompson, Martin O'Reilly, Eoin McHugh 0-3 each, Patrick McBrearty 0-2 (0-1f), Michael Murphy 0-2 (0-2f) each, Michael Carroll, Eoghan Bán Gallagher, Jamie Brennan 0-1 each |

| 12 February 2017 Round 2 | Monaghan | 0-07 - 0-07 | Cavan | St Mary's Park, Castleblayney |
| 14.00 | Conor McManus (0-4, 0-3f), Conor McCarthy (0-1), Kieran Hughes (0-1), Fintan Kelly (0-1) | Report | Seanie Johnston (0-3f), Ciaran Brady (0-1), Niall Clerkin (0-1), Gearoid McKiernan (0-1), Conor Madden (0-1) |

==== Division 1 Round 3 ====
| 25 February 2017 Round 3 | Mayo | 1-19 - 0-14 | Roscommon | Elverys MacHale Park, Castlebar |
| 19.00 | Cillian O'Connor (1-4, 1-0 pen, 1f), Lee Keegan, Fergal Boland, Brendan Harrison, Conor Loftus 0-2 each, Kevin McLoughlin, Conor O'Shea, Evan Regan (0-1, 1f), Jason Gibbons, Diarmuid O'Connor, Andy Moran, Donal Vaughan 0-1 each | Report | Conor Devaney, Donie Smith 0-3 each, Enda Smith, Ciaran Murtagh 0-2 each, Fintan Cregg, Thomas Corcoran, Niall Kilroy, Shane Kiloran 0-1 each | Attendance: 11,657 |

| 26 February 2017 Round 3 | Donegal | 2-05 - 1-08 | Dublin | MacCumhail Park, Ballybofey |
| 14.00 | Jason McGee 1-1, Ryan McHugh 1-0, Ciarán Thompson, Michael Murphy 0-2f each | Report | Niall Scully 1-1, Dean Rock (0-3f), Shane B. Carthy, Ciaran Reddin, Ciarán Kilkenny, David Byrne 0-1 each |

| 26 February 2017 Round 3 | Kerry | 1-10 - 2-08 | Monaghan | Fitzgerald Stadium, Killarney |
| 14.00 | James O'Donoghue (0-3f), Paul Geaney (0-3f), David Moran 1-0, Tadhg Morley 0-1, Paul Murphy 0-1, Barry John Keane 0-1f, Brendan Kealy 0-1f. | Report | Jack McCarron 1-3 (0-1f), Gavin Doogan 1-0, Kieran Hughes, Conor McManus 0-2 each, Rory Beggan 0-1f |

| 12 March 2017 Round 3 | Tyrone | 0-19 - 1-09 | Cavan | Healy Park, Omagh |
| 14.30 | Peter Harte (0-4f), Sean Cavanagh (0-3f), Mark Bradley 0-3, Ronan O'Neill 0-2, Niall Morgan (0-1f), Tiernan McCann, Colm Cavanagh, Pádraig McNulty, Kieran McGeary, Darren McCurry, Mattie Donnelly 0-1 each | Report | Gearoid McKiernan 1-4 (0-2f), Martin Reilly 0-3, Dara McVeety, Conor Madden 0-1 each |

==== Division 1 Round 4 ====
| 4 March 2017 Round 4 | Cavan | 0-11 - 1-16 | Donegal | Kingspan Breffni Park, Cavan |
| 19:00 | | Report |

| 4 March 2017 Round 4 | Dublin | 1-16 - 0-07 | Mayo | Croke Park, Dublin |
| 19:00 | Dean Rock 0-8 (0-6f), Conor McHugh 1-3, Eric Lowndes, Philly McMahon 0-2 each, Paul Flynn 0-1 | Report | Cillian O'Connor (0-2 '45), Evan Regan (0-2f), Stephen Coen, Colm Boyle, Tom Parsons 0-1 each | Attendance: 34,578; Referee: David Coldrick (Meath); Man of the Match: Philly McMahon |

| 4 March 2017 Round 4 | Tyrone | 0-14 - 0-10 | Monaghan | Healy Park, Omagh |
| 19:00 | | Report |

| 5 March 2017 Round 4 | Roscommon | 1-13 - 1-19 | Kerry | Dr Hyde Park, Roscommon |
| 14:00 | | Report |

==== Division 1 Round 5 ====
| 18 March 2017 Round 5 | Kerry | 0-13 - 0-13 | Dublin | Austin Stack Park, Tralee |
| 19:00 | Paul Geaney 0-7 (0-4f), Donnchadh Walsh, Peter Crowley, Brendan Kealy (1 '45), David Moran, Kevin McCarthy, Barry John Keane 0-1 each | Report | Dean Rock 0-9f, Conor McHugh 0-2, Eoghan O'Gara and Paul Mannion 0-1 each | Attendance: 11,858; Referee: Sean Hurson (Tyrone) |

| 18 March 2017 Round 5 | Donegal | 0-12 - 0-06 | Tyrone | MacCumhaill Park, Ballybofey |
| 19:00 | | Report |

| 19 March 2017 Round 5 | Mayo | 0-15 - 1-14 | Cavan | Elverys MacHale Park, Castlebar |
| 14:00 | | Report |

| 19 March 2017 Round 5 | Monaghan | 2-17 - 1-13 | Roscommon | Páirc Grattan, Inniskeen |
| 14:00 | | Report |

==== Division 1 Round 6 ====
| 25 March 2017 Round 6 | Dublin | 2-29 - 0-14 | Roscommon | Croke Park, Dublin |
| 19:00 | Paul Flynn 1-6, Kevin McManamon 1-1, Conor McHugh (0-2f) 0-4, Paddy Andrews, Bernard Brogan, Dean Rock (0-2f) 0-3 each, Ciaran Reddin, Niall Scully 0-2 each, Eric Lowndes, Brian Fenton, Shane B Carthy, Jack McCaffrey, Diarmuid Connolly 0-1 each. | Report | Diarmuid Murtagh 0-3 (0-1f), Donie Smith, Enda Smith, Ciaran Murtagh (0-1f), Cian Connolly (0-1f) 0-2 each, Gary Patterson, Shane Killoran, Niall Kilroy 0-1 each. | Attendance: 20,500; Referee: Cormac Reilly (Meath); Man of the Match: Paul Flynn |

| 26 March 2017 Round 6 | Cavan | 1-10 - 0-13 | Kerry | Kingspan Breffni Park, Cavan |
| 14:00 | Paul Geaney 0-5 (0-4f), Bryan Sheehan 0-3 (0-2f), Barry John Keane 0-2, Donnchadh Walsh, Jack Barry, Paul Murphy 0-1 each | Report | Dara McVeety 1-0, Niall McDermott 0-3 (0-2f), Conor Madden 0-2 (0-1f), Gearoid McKiernan, Killian Clarke, Niall Clerkin, Conor Moynagh, Sean Johnston (0-1f) 0-1 each | Attendance: 8,000; Referee: Maurice Deegan (Laois) |

| 26 March 2017 Round 6 | Donegal | 1-11 - 1-11 | Monaghan | Fr Tierney Park, Ballyshannon |
| 15:00 | | Report |

| 26 March 2017 Round 6 | Tyrone | 0-12 - 1-10 | Mayo | Healy Park, Omagh |
| 15:00 | Mark Bradley 0-3, Darren McCurry, Kieran McGeary, Sean Cavanagh (0-1f) 0-2 each, Niall Sludden, Tiernan McCann, Niall Morgan (0-1f) 0-1 each | Report | Cillian O'Connor 0-5 (0-3f 1 '45), Tom Parsons 1-0, Kevin McLoughlin, Patrick Durcan 0-2 each, Shane Nally 0-1 | Referee: Conor Lane (Cork) |

==== Division 1 Round 7 ====
| 2 April 2017 Round 7 | Kerry | 1-21 - 2-11 | Tyrone | Fitzgerald Stadium, Killarney |
| 14:00 | | Report | | Attendance: 8,125 |

| 2 April 2017 Round 7 | Mayo | 1-12 - 0-13 | Donegal | Elverys MacHale Park, Castlebar |
| 14:00 | | Report | | Attendance: 14,102 |

| 2 April 2017 Round 7 | Monaghan | 1-15 - 2-15 | Dublin | St Tiernach's Park, Clones |
| 14:00 | Jack McCarron 1-9 (0-4f), Kieran Hughes 0-2, Karl O'Connell, Conor McManus (0-1f), Fintan Kelly, Owen Duffy 0-1 each | Report | Dean Rock 0-5f, Bernard Brogan 1-1, Jack McCaffrey 1-0, James McCarthy 0-2, Paddy Andrews 0-2, Ciarán Reddin 0-2, Brian Fenton, Philip McMahon, Ciarán Kilkenny 0-1 each | Attendance: 13,227; Referee: Joe McQuillan (Cavan) |

| 2 April 2017 Round 7 | Roscommon | 1-13 - 1-10 | Cavan | Dr Hyde Park, Roscommon |
| 14:00 | | Report |

=== Division 1 Final ===
| 9 April 2017; 4:00 pm Final | Kerry | 0-20 - 1-16 | Dublin | Croke Park, Dublin; Attendance: 53,840; Referee: Paddy Neilan (Roscommon); Man of the Match: David Moran (Kerins O'Rahilly's) |
| 9 April 2017; 4:00 pm Final | Paul Geaney 0-8 (0-5f), David Moran 0-3 (1 '45), Michael Geaney and Donnchadh Walsh 0-2 each, Kevin McCarthy, Jack Savage, Paul Murphy, Jack Barry and Bryan Sheehan 0-1 each | Report | Dean Rock 0-6 (0-4f), Paul Mannion 1-2, Ciarán Kilkenny and Ciaran Reddin 0-2 each, Philly McMahon, James McCarthy, Paul Flynn and Diarmuid Connolly 0-1 each | Croke Park, Dublin; Attendance: 53,840; Referee: Paddy Neilan (Roscommon); Man of the Match: David Moran (Kerins O'Rahilly's) |

== Division 2 ==
=== Division 2 table ===
Qualify for Division 2 final and automatic promotion to Division 1 Automatic relegation to Division 3

| Team | Pld | W | D | L | F | A | Diff | Pts |
|---|---|---|---|---|---|---|---|---|
| Galway | 7 | 5 | 1 | 1 | 12-99 | 6-86 | 31 | 11 |
| Kildare | 7 | 5 | 0 | 2 | 11-102 | 3-94 | 32 | 10 |
| Meath | 7 | 4 | 1 | 2 | 11-107 | 5-91 | 34 | 9 |
| Cork | 7 | 2 | 3 | 2 | 4-90 | 6-86 | -2 | 7 |
| Clare | 7 | 2 | 1 | 4 | 9-78 | 6-99 | -12 | 5 |
| Down | 7 | 2 | 1 | 4 | 3-85 | 10-85 | -18 | 5 |
| Derry | 7 | 2 | 1 | 4 | 8-79 | 11-104 | -34 | 5 |
| Fermanagh | 7 | 2 | 0 | 5 | 1-87 | 12-85 | -31 | 4 |

- Clare, Down and Derry finished on five league points and are ranked by score difference.

=== Division 2 Rounds 1 to 7 ===
==== Division 2 Round 1 ====
| 4 February 2017 Round 1 | Down | 0-10 - 1-16 | Fermanagh | Páirc Esler, Newry |
| 19:00 | Alan Davidson 0-5 (0-2f, 1 '45), Shay Millar, Conail McGovern, Kevin McKernan, Joe Murphy, Aidan Carr 0-1 each | Report | Tomas Corrigan 0-8 (0-7f), Eoin McManus 1-0, Aidan Breen 0-2, Sean Quigley, Eddie Courtney, Paul McCusker, Barry Mulrone, Cathal Beacom, Ryan Lyons 0-1 each. | Referee: F Kelly (Longford) |

| 5 February 2017 Round 1 | Derry | 0-11 - 1-8 | Clare | Celtic Park, Derry |
| 14:00 | James Kielt 0-4 (0-1f), Carlus McWilliams 0-2, Niall Loughlin 0-2 (1 '45), Enda Lynn 0-2, Mark Lynch 0-1f | Report | Jamie Malone 1-0, Eoin Cleary 0-3f, Ciaran Russell 0-2, Sean Collins, Liam Markham, David Tubridy 0-1 each | Referee: Niall Cullen (Fermanagh) |

| 5 February 2017 Round 1 | Galway | 0-14 - 1-11 | Cork | Pearse Stadium, Salthill |
| 14:00 | Barry McHugh 0-6f, Danny Cummins 0-3 (0-1f), Declan Kyne, Gary O’Donnell, Paul Conroy, Cillian McDaid, Cathal Sweeney 0-1 each | Report | Colm O’Neill 0-5 (0-1f), Paul Kerrigan 1-0, Mark Collins 0-2, Ruairi Deane, Niall Coakley (0-1f), Luke Connolly, John O’Rourke 0-1 eaach | Referee: Sean Hurson (Tyrone) |

| 5 February 2017 Round 1 | Meath | 0-16 - 3-17 | Kildare | Páirc Tailteann, Navan |
| 14:00 | Donal Lenihan 0-7 (0-5f), Graham Reilly 0-4, Alan Forde and Cillian O’Sullivan 0-2 each, Brian Menton 0-1. | Report | Niall Kelly 2-2, Ben McCormack 1-3, Paul Cribbin and Neil Flynn (0-1f) 0-3 each, Keith Cribbin 0-2, Ollie Lyons, Eoin Doyle, Kevin Feely, Daniel Flynn 0-1 each. | Referee: Ciaran Branagan (Down) |

==== Division 2 Round 2 ====
| 12 February 2017 Round 2 | Clare | 2-11 - 0-11 | Down | Cusack Park, Ennis |
| 14:00 | David Tubridy 1-3, Keelan Sexton 1-1, Eoin Cleary (0-1f) and Jamie Malone 0-3 each, Sean Collins 0-1 | Report | Cathal Magee 0-3 (0-2f), Barry O’Hagan (0-1f) and Ryan Johnston 0-2 each, Darren O’Hagan, Aidan Carr, Shay Millar, Pat Havern 0-1 each | Referee: Noel Mooney (Cavan) |

| 12 February 2017 Round 2 | Fermanagh | 0-10 - 1-13 | Galway | Brewster Park, Enniskillen |
| 14:00 | Sean Quigley 0-3 (0-1f, 1 '45), Tomás Corrigan 0-2 (0-1f), Eddie Courtney 0-2, Barry Mulrone, Lee Cullen, Aidan Breen 0-1 each | Report | Damien Comer 1-2, Barry McHugh 0-4f, Michael Daly 0-3, Paul Conroy 0-2, Tom Flynn and Éamonn Brannigan 0-1 each | Referee: Jerome Henry (Mayo) |

| 12 February 2017 Round 2 | Kildare | 1-14 - 1-08 | Cork | St Conleth's Park, Newbridge |
| 14:00 | Ben McCormack 1-2, Neil Flynn 0-5 (0-3f), Kevin Feely and Paul Cribbin 0-2, Tommy Moolick, Daniel Flynn, Chris Healy (0-1f) 0-1 each | Report | Luke Connolly 1-3 (0-2f, 1 '45), Tomas Clancy, Aidan Walsh, Colm O’Neill (0-1f), Paul Kerrigan, Barry O’Driscoll 0-1 each | Referee: Cormac Reilly (Meath) |

| 12 February 2017 Round 2 | Meath | 3-15 - 0-09 | Derry | Páirc Tailteann, Navan |
| 15:00 | Cillian O’Sullivan 2-02, Bryan Menton 0-4, Bryan McMahon 1-1, Ruairi Ó Coileain 0-2, Shane McEntee, James Toher (1 '45), Alan Forde, Cian O'Brien, Brian Sheridan, Joey Wallace 0-1 each | Report | James Kielt, Enda Lynn, Benny Herron 0-2 each, Conor McAtamney, Niall Loughlin (0-1f), Emmett McGuckin 0-1 each |

==== Division 2 Round 3 ====
| 25 February 2017 Round 3 | Down | 1-13 - 0-14 | Meath | Páirc Esler, Newry |
| 19:00 | Darragh O'Hanlon 0-4 (0-3f), Joe Murphy 1-0, Kevin McKernan and Barry O'Hagan 0-2 each, Conail McGovern, Aidan Carr, Conor Maginn, Ryan Johnston, Jerome Johnston 0-1 each | Report | Donal Lenihan 0-8 (0-6f), James Toher (0-1f) and Graham Reilly 0-2 each, Bryan McMahon and Donal Keogan 0-1 each | Referee: Padraig O'Sullivan (Kerry) |

| 26 February 2017 Round 3 | Cork | 1-14 - 0-09 | Fermanagh | Páirc Uí Rinn, Cork |
| 13:00 | Niall Coakley 1-4 (0-3f), Paul Kerrigan 0-4, Brian O’Driscoll 0-2, Luke Connolly, John O’Rourke, Donncha O’Connor, Donal Óg Hodnett 0-1 each | Report | Sean Quigley (0-3f, 1 '45), Aidan Breen, Eddie Courtney, Tomás Corrigan, Ryan Jones 0-1 each | Referee: Anthony Nolan (Wicklow) |

| 26 February 2017 Round 3 | Derry | 1-18 - 1-17 | Kildare | Celtic Park, Derry |
| 14:00 | James Kielt 0-9 (0-5f), Emmett McGuckin 1-1, Carlus McWilliams 0-3, Niall Loughlin 0-2, Conor McAtamney, Enda Lynn, Danny Tallon 0-1 each | Report | Neil Flynn 0-5 (0-4f), Chris Healy 1-0, Daniel Flynn and Niall Kelly 0-3, Fergal Conway 0-2, Johnny Byrne, Keith Cribbin, Kevin Feely, Tommy Moolick 0-1 each | Referee: Sean Hurson (Tyrone) |

| 26 February 2017 Round 3 | Galway | 3-13 - 1-11 | Clare | Pearse Stadium, Salthill |
| 14:00 | Gareth Bradshaw 1-2, Barry McHugh 0-5 (0-4f), Shane Walsh 1-1, Éamonn Brannigan 1-0, Gary O’Donnell, Johnny Heaney, Paul Conroy, Michael Daly, Micheal Lundy 0-1 each | Report | Eoin Cleary 0-4 (0-3f), Keelan Sexton 1-0, Jamie Malone 0-3, David Tubridy 0-2 (0-1f), Liam Markham and Ciaran Russell 0-1 each | Referee: Fergal Kelly (Longford) |

==== Division 2 Round 4 ====
| 5 March 2017 Round 4 | Clare | 2-11 - 0-09 | Cork | Cusack Park, Ennis |
| 14:00 | Jamie Malone 1-1, David Tubridy 0-4 (0-2f), Cian O’Dea 1-0, Eoin Cleary 0-3 (0-1f, 0-1 ’45), Cathal O’Connor, Ciaran Russell, Shane Brennan 0-1 each | Report | Niall Coakley 0-2f, Michael Shields, Tomás Clancy, James Loughrey, Aidan Walsh, Luke Connolly (1 '45), Paul Kerrigan, Colm O’Neill 0-1 each |

| 5 March 2017 Round 4 | Meath | 1-13 - 0-15 | Galway | Páirc Tailteann, Navan |
| 14:00 | Donal Lenihan 1-5 (0-1f), Cillian O’Sullivan and Graham Reilly 0-2 each, Donal Keogan, Willie Carry, Sean Tobin (0-1f), Alan Forde 0-1 each | Report | Barry McHugh 0-5 (1 '45, 0-3f), Paul Conroy 0-3 (0-1f), Michael Daly 0-2, Gary O’Donnell, Liam Silke, Tom Flynn, Shane Walsh, Johnny Heaney 0-1 each | Referee: Maurice Deegan (Laois) |

| 5 March 2017 Round 4 | Derry | 1-07 - 1-15 | Down | Celtic Park, Derry |
| 14:30 | Emmett McGuckin 1-2, Conor McAtamney 0-2, James Kielt (0-1f), Benny Herron, Mark Craig 0-1 each | Report | Darragh O'Hanlon 0-6 (0-5f), Ryan Johnston 1-1, Caolan Mooney and Barry O'Hagan 0-3 each, Conor Maginn and Joe Murphy 0-1 each | Referee: Paddy Neilan (Roscommon) |

| 5 March 2017 Round 4 | Kildare | 4-14 - 0-14 | Fermanagh | St Conleth's Park, Newbridge |
| 13:00 | Tommy Moolick 2-0, Neil Flynn 0-4(2f), Daniel Flynn and Chris Healy 1-1 each, Fionn Dowling 0-2, Kevin Feely, Fergal Conway, Niall Kelly, Paul Cribbin, Eddie Heavey, Conor Hartley 0-1 each. | Report | Barry Mulrone 0-4, Ryan Jones (0-1f), Tomás Corrigan (0-2f), Seán Quigley (0-2f) 0-2 each, Mickey Jones, Eoin Donnelly, Aidan Breen, Ryan Lyons 0-1 each | Referee: Padraig O’Sullivan (Kerry) |

==== Division 2 Round 5 ====
| 18 March 2017 Round 5 | Down | 0-10 - 2-09 | Kildare | Páirc Esler, Newry |
| 19:00 | | Report |

| 19 March 2017 Round 5 | Cork | 0-18 - 1-15 | Meath | Páirc Uí Rinn, Cork |
| 14:00 | | Report |

| 19 March 2017 Round 5 | Fermanagh | 0-18 - 1-10 | Clare | Brewster Park, Enniskillen |
| 14:00 | Sean Quigley 0-8 (0-5f, 2 '45), Aidan Breen 0-3, Eddie Courtney and Barry Mulrone 0-2 each, Paul McCusker, Ryan Jones, Tomas Corrigan 0-1 each | Report | Eoin Cleary 0-5 (0-4f), David Tubridy 0-4 (0-2f), Keelan Sexton 1-0, Jamie Malone 0-1 |

| 19 March 2017 Round 5 | Galway | 5-15 - 2-15 | Derry | St Jarlath's Park, Tuam |
| 14:00 | | Report |

==== Division 2 Round 6 ====
| 26 March 2017 Round 6 | Derry | 2-10 - 0-20 | Cork | Celtic Park, Derry |
| 15:00 |

| 26 March 2017 Round 6 | Kildare | 0-18 - 1-14 | Clare | St Conleth's Park, Newbridge |
| 15:15 | | Report |

| 26 March 2017 Round 6 | Meath | 3-15 - 0-6 | Fermanagh | Páirc Tailteann, Navan |
| 15:00 | | Report |

| 26 March 2017 Round 6 | Down | 1-13 - 3-15 | Galway | Páirc Esler, Newry |
| 15:00 |

==== Division 2 Round 7 ====
| 2 April 2017 Round 7 | Clare | 1-13 - 3-19 | Meath | Cusack Park, Ennis |
| 14:00 | | Report |

| 2 April 2017 Round 7 | Cork | 1-10 - 0-13 | Down | Páirc Uí Rinn, Cork |
| 14:00 | | Report |

| 2 April 2017 Round 7 | Fermanagh | 0-13 - 2-8 | Derry | Brewster Park, Enniskillen |
| 14:00 |

| 2 April 2017 Round 7 | Galway | 0-14 - 0-13 | Kildare | Pearse Stadium, Galway |
| 14:00 |

=== Division 2 Final ===
| 9 April 2017; 2:00 pm Final | Galway | 0-18 – 0-16 | Kildare | Croke Park; Referee: Derek O’Mahony (Tipperary); Man of the Match: Paul Conroy (St. James') |
| 9 April 2017; 2:00 pm Final | Shane Walsh and Sean Armstrong (0-1f) 0-3 each, Johnny Heaney, Michael Daly, Gary O’Donnell, Paul Conroy 0-2 each, Eamonn Brannigan, Gareth Bradshaw, Liam Silke, Gary Sice (0-1f) 0-1 each | Report | Niall Kelly 0-5, Kevin Feely 0-4 (0-3f), Tommy Moolick, Mark Donnellan (0-1f), David Hyland, Keith Cribbin, Fergal Conway, Fionn Dowling, Cathal McNally 0-1 each | Croke Park; Referee: Derek O’Mahony (Tipperary); Man of the Match: Paul Conroy (St. James') |

== Division 3 ==
=== Division 3 table ===
Qualify for Division 3 final and automatic promotion to Division 2 Automatic relegation to Division 4

| Team | Pld | W | D | L | F | A | Diff | Pts |
|---|---|---|---|---|---|---|---|---|
| Louth | 7 | 5 | 0 | 2 | 7-88 | 4-89 | 8 | 10 |
| Tipperary | 7 | 5 | 0 | 2 | 12-96 | 5-98 | 19 | 10 |
| Armagh | 7 | 4 | 1 | 2 | 15-103 | 9-76 | 45 | 9 |
| Sligo | 7 | 3 | 1 | 3 | 8-87 | 8-89 | -2 | 7 |
| Offaly | 7 | 3 | 0 | 4 | 7-97 | 18-90 | -26 | 6 |
| Longford | 7 | 2 | 1 | 4 | 4-94 | 10-82 | -6 | 5 |
| Antrim | 7 | 2 | 1 | 4 | 4-78 | 6-91 | -19 | 5 |
| Laois | 7 | 2 | 0 | 5 | 10-80 | 9-103 | -20 | 4 |

- Louth are ranked ahead of Tipperary as they won the head-to-head game between the teams.
- Longford v. Antrim was a draw so the teams are ranked by score difference.

=== Division 3 Rounds 1 to 7 ===
==== Division 3 Round 1 ====
| 4 February 2017 Round 1 | Laois | 0-10 - 2-16 | Louth | O'Moore Park |
| 19:00 | | Report |

| 5 February 2017 Round 1 | Longford | 1-12 - 0-10 | Offaly | Glennon Brothers Pearse Park |
| 14:00 | | Report |

| 5 February 2017 Round 1 | Tipperary | 2-12 - 0-13 | Antrim | Semple Stadium |
| 14:00 | Philip Austin 1-2, Conor Sweeney 0-4 (0-2f), Michael Quinlivan 1-0, Josh Keane 0-2f, Kevin Fahey, Robbie Kiely, Liam McGrath (0-1f) and Brian Fox 0-1 each | Report | C.J. McGourty 0-4 (0-2f), Ryan Murray 0-3 (0-2f, 1 sl); Patrick McBride and Matthew Fitzpatrick 0-2 each, Patrick McAleer, Conor Murray 0-1 each | Referee: B Cawley (Kildare) |

| 5 February 2017 Round 1 | Sligo | 1-14 - 2-11 | Armagh | Markievicz Park |
| 14:00 | | Report |

==== Division 3 Round 2 ====
| 12 February 2017 Round 2 | Tipperary | 1-16 - 2-14 | Sligo | Semple Stadium |
| 14:00 | Michael Quinlivan 1-2 (0-2f), Conor Sweeney 0-5 (0-3f), Kevin O’Halloran 0-4 (0-2f, 1 45), Alan Moloney 0-2, Brian Fox, Philip Austin and Liam Boland 0-1 each | Report | Kyle Cawley 1-2, Niall Murphy 1-1, Adrian Marren 0-4 (0-2f), Mark Breheny 0-3 (0-2f), Gerard O’Kelly-Lynch 0-2, Aidan Devaney (1 '45) and Criostóir Davey 0-1 each |

| 12 February 2017 Round 2 | Louth | 0-11 - 0-10 | Longford | Gaelic Grounds, Drogheda |
| 14:00 | | Report |

| 12 February 2017 Round 2 | Offaly | 0-23 - 1-07 | Antrim | O'Connor Park, Tullamore |
| 15:00 |

| 12 February 2017 Round 2 | Armagh | 0-16 - 2-11 | Laois | Athletic Grounds, Armagh |
| 15:30 |

==== Division 3 Round 3 ====
| 25 February 2017 Round 3 | Laois | 1-10 - 1-16 | Tipperary | O'Moore Park |
| 19:00 | | Report |

| 26 February 2017 Round 3 | Longford | 3-09 - 3-11 | Armagh | Glennon Brothers Pearse Park |
| 14:00 |

| 26 February 2017 Round 3 | Offaly | 0-14 - 2-13 | Louth | O'Connor Park, Tullamore |
| 14:00 | | Report |

| 26 February 2017 Round 3 | Antrim | 0-11 - 1-07 | Sligo | Corrigan Park, Belfast |
| 14:00 |

==== Division 3 Round 4 ====
| 11 March 2017 Round 4 | Tipperary | 3-17 - 0-18 | Longford | Semple Stadium |
| | | Report |

| 5 March 2017 Round 4 | Louth | 2-10 - 1-11 | Antrim | Gaelic Grounds, Drogheda |
| 14:00 | | Report |

| 5 March 2017 Round 4 | Armagh | 6-22 - 0-10 | Offaly | Athletic Grounds, Armagh |
| 14:00 |

| 5 March 2017 Round 4 | Sligo | 0-18 - 2-10 | Laois | Markievicz Park |
| 14:30 |

==== Division 3 Round 5 ====
| 19 March 2017 Round 5 | Antrim | 1-10 - 0-11 | Laois | Corrigan Park, Belfast |
| 14:00 |

| 19 March 2017 Round 5 | Louth | 0-10 - 3-15 | Armagh | Gaelic Grounds, Drogheda |
| 14:00 | | Report |

| 19 March 2017 Round 5 | Longford | 0-16 - 2-07 | Sligo | Glennon Brothers Pearse Park |
| 14:00 |

| 19 March 2017 Round 5 | Offaly | 2-11 - 2-15 | Tipperary | O'Connor Park, Tullamore |
| 14:00 | | Report |

==== Division 3 Round 6 ====
| 25 March 2017 Round 6 | Armagh | 1-12 - 0-13 | Antrim | Athletic Grounds, Armagh |
| 19:00 |

| 25 March 2017 Round 6 | Laois | 1-13 - 0-13 | Longford | O'Moore Park |
| 19:00 |

| 26 March 2017 Round 6 | Sligo | 2-10 - 2-14 | Offaly | Markievicz Park |
| 15:00 |

| 26 March 2017 Round 6 | Tipperary | 0-12 - 0-16 | Louth | Semple Stadium |
| 15:00 |

==== Division 3 Round 7 ====
| 2 April 2017 Round 7 | Antrim | 1-13 - 0-16 | Longford | Corrigan Park, Belfast |
| 14:00 |

| 2 April 2017 Round 7 | Louth | 1-11 - 0-17 | Sligo | Gaelic Grounds, Drogheda |
| 14:00 | Ronan Holcroft 1-1, Jim McEneaney 0-4 (0-3f), James Califf 0-3f, Sam Mulroy 0-2, Darren McMahon 0-1 | Report | Niall Murphy 0-6 (0-3f), John Kelly 0-3 (0-2f), Adrian Marren and Mark Breheny (0-1f) 0-2 each, Charlie Harrison, Adrian McIntyre, Eoin McHugh, Pat Hughes 0-1 each |

| 2 April 2017 Round 7 | Armagh | 0-16 - 3-8 | Tipperary | Athletic Grounds, Armagh |
| 14:00 | Andrew Murnin, Rory Grugan, Jamie Clarke 0-3 each, Niall Grimley, Oisín O'Neill 0-2 each, Gregory McCabe, Aidan Forker, Stefan Campbell 0-1 each | Report | Michael Quinlivan 3-1, Conor Sweeney 0-2 (0-1f), Kevin O’Halloran 0-2 (0-2f), Robbie Kiely, Liam Boland, Alan Maloney 0-1 each |

| 2 April 2017 Round 7 | Offaly | 3-15 - 4-11 | Laois | O'Connor Park, Tullamore |
| 14:00 |

=== Division 3 Final ===
| 8 April 2017; 5:00 pm Final | Tipperary | 3-19 – 0-19 | Louth | Croke Park; Referee: Anthony Nolan (Wicklow); Man of the Match: Michael Quinlivan (Clonmel Commercials) |
| 8 April 2017; 5:00 pm Final | Conor Sweeney 2-5 (0-3f), Liam Casey 1-1, Kevin O’Halloran (0-2f) & Michael Quinlivan (0-2f) 0-3 each, Jack Kennedy 0-2, Alan Campbell, Robbie Kiely, Josh Keane, Liam Boland, Liam McGrath 0-1 each | Report | Ryan Burns 0-5 (0-4f), Tommy Durnin and Jim McEneaney (0-3f) 0-3 each, Pauric Smith and Declan Byrne (0-1f) 0-2 each, Derek Maguire, Andy McDonnell, Bevan Duffy, Eoin O’Connor 0-1 each | Croke Park; Referee: Anthony Nolan (Wicklow); Man of the Match: Michael Quinlivan (Clonmel Commercials) |

== Division 4 ==
=== Division 4 table ===
Qualify for Division 4 final and automatic promotion to Division 3

| Team | Pld | W | D | L | F | A | Diff | Pts |
|---|---|---|---|---|---|---|---|---|
| Westmeath | 7 | 6 | 1 | 0 | 13-128 | 5-74 | 78 | 13 |
| Wexford | 7 | 5 | 0 | 2 | 3-85 | 6-92 | -16 | 10 |
| Carlow | 7 | 4 | 1 | 2 | 10-90 | 7-84 | 25 | 9 |
| Limerick | 7 | 4 | 0 | 3 | 6-81 | 4-86 | 1 | 8 |
| Leitrim | 7 | 4 | 0 | 3 | 7-98 | 8-90 | 5 | 8 |
| Waterford | 7 | 2 | 0 | 5 | 6-77 | 9-73 | -8 | 4 |
| Wicklow | 7 | 1 | 0 | 6 | 3-83 | 8-101 | -33 | 2 |
| London | 7 | 1 | 0 | 6 | 6-72 | 8-119 | -53 | 2 |

- Limerick are ranked ahead of Leitrim as they won the head-to-head game between the teams.
- Wicklow are ranked ahead of London as they won the head-to-head game between the teams.

=== Division 4 Rounds 1 to 7 ===
==== Division 4 Round 1 ====
| 5 February 2017 Round 1 | Waterford | 2-16 - 1-8 | London | Ardmore |
| | | Report |

| 5 February 2017 Round 1 | Westmeath | 2-10 - 2-10 | Carlow | Cusack Park |
| | John Heslin 1-5 (0-3f), James Dolan 1-0, Alan Gaughan 0-2, Paddy Holloway, Cormac Boyle, Paul Sharry 0-1 each | Report | Paul Broderick 1-5 (1-0 pen, 0-3f), Shane O'Neill 1-0, Darragh Foley 0-2f, Brendan Murphy, Eoghan Ruth, Alan Kelly 0-1 each | Referee: P Faloon |

| 5 February 2017 Round 1 | Wicklow | 0-10 - 1-17 | Leitrim | Aughrim |
| | | Report |

| 5 February 2017 Round 1 | Wexford | 0-14 - 1-8 | Limerick | Wexford Park |
| | PJ Banville 0-5 (0-4f), Ciarán Lyng 0-3 (0-2f), Eoghan Nolan 0-2, Colm Kehoe, John Turbitt, Shane Roche (1 '45), Tiernan Rossiter 0-1 each | Report | Danny Neville 1-1, Ger Collins 0-3 (0-2f), Séamus O’Carroll and Jamie Lee (0-1f) 0-2 each | Referee: Alan Kissane (Waterford) |

==== Division 4 Round 2 ====
| 11 February 2017 Round 2 | Waterford | 1-17 - 1-09 | Wicklow | WIT |
| 19:00 |

| 12 February 2017 Round 2 | Carlow | 0-16 - 2-15 | London | Netwatch Cullen Park |
| 13:00 |

| 12 February 2017 Round 2 | Limerick | 0-12 - 1-18 | Westmeath | Gaelic Grounds |
| | Jamie Lee 0-4f, Darragh Tracey, Séamus O’Carroll 0-2 each, Brian Fanning, Danny Neville, Brian Donovan, Seán McSweeney (0-1f) 0-1 each | Report | Ger Egan 1-4 (1-0 pen), John Heslin 0-5 (0-3f), Paul Sharry (1 '45) and Kieran Martin 0-2 each, David Lynch ('1 45), John Egan, Luke Loughlin, Shane Dempsey, Denis Glennon 0-1 each | Referee: James Bermingham (Cork) |

| 12 February 2017 Round 2 | Leitrim | 0-14 - 0-16 | Wexford | Carrick-on-Shannon |
| 14:00 | Emlyn Mulligan 0-6f, Gary Plunkett 0-3, Ryan O’Rourke, Dean McGovern, Mark Plunkett, Nevin O’Donnell (0-1f) & Keith Beirne (0-1f) 0-1 each | Report | Ciarán Lyng (0-1f) & P.J. Banville (0-3f) 0-5 each, John Turbitt 0-3, Ben Brosnan, Eoghan Nolan, Michael O’Regan (0-1f) 0-1 each | Referee: Patrick Maguire (Longford) |

==== Division 4 Round 3 ====
| 25 February 2017 Round 3 | Carlow | 1-10 - 0-10 | Limerick | Dr Cullen Park |
| 19:00 |

| 26 February 2017 Round 3 | Wicklow | 0-17 - 2-04 | London | Aughrim |
| 13:00 |

| 26 February 2017 Round 3 | Wexford | 1-09 - 0-10 | Waterford | Wexford Park |
| 13:00 | Kevin O’Grady 1-2, Ciarán Lyng 0-3 (0-2f), Ben Brosnan 0-2 (0-1f), John Tubritt and Michael O’Regan 0-1 each | Report | Patrick Hurney 0-4 (0-3f), Donie Breathnach and Paul Whyte (0-1f) 0-2 each, Michael O'Halloran and Conor Murray 0-1 each | Referee: Fergal Smyth (Offaly) |

| 26 February 2017 Round 3 | Westmeath | 2-18 - 1-09 | Leitrim | Mullingar |
| 14:00 | John Heslin 1-11 (0-7f), Tommy McDaniels 1-0, Ger Egan and Paul Sharry 0-2 each, Paddy Holloway, Alan Stone, Kieran Martin 0-1 each | Report | Ronan Kennedy 1-1, Nevin O'Donell 0-4 (0-3f), Damien Moran 0-2, Oisin Madden and Emlyn Mulligan (0-1f) 0-1 each | Referee: John Gilmartin (Sligo) |

==== Division 4 Round 4 ====
| 4 March 2017 Round 4 | Limerick | 1-13 - 0-12 | London | University of Limerick 3G Pitch |
| 19:00 |

| 5 March 2017 Round 4 | Leitrim | 2-14 - 2-12 | Carlow | Páirc Seán Mac Diarmada, Carrick-on-Shannon |
| 14:00 |

| 5 March 2017 Round 4 | Waterford | 2-11 - 3-13 | Westmeath | Ardmore GAA Grounds, Waterford |
| 14:00 | Gavin Crotty 1-2, Joey Veale 1-1, Patrick Hurney (0-3f) and Donie Breathnach 0-3 each, Conor Murray 0-2. | Report | Kieran Martin 2-1, John Heslin 0-6 (0-4f), Thomas O’Gorman og 1-0, Paul Sharry (3 '45s) and Ger Egan (0-1f, 1 pen) 0-3 each | Referee: K Murphy (Cork) |

| 5 March 2017 Round 4 | Wicklow | 0-13 - 1-13 | Wexford | Arklow GAA Grounds, Wicklow |
| 14:00 | Seánie Furlong 0-8 (0-6f), Rory Finn 0-2, Dean Healy, Stephen Kelly, Tommy Kelly 0-1 each | Report | Ben Brosnan 0-4 (0-2f), Niall Hughes 1-0, Kevin O'Grady and Ciarán Lyng (0-1f) 0-3 each, Brian Malone, Paul Curtis, Michael O'Regan 0-1 each | Referee: James Bermingham (Cork) |

==== Division 4 Round 5 ====
| 18 March 2017 Round 5 | Carlow | 2-10 - 0-07 | Waterford | Dr Cullen Park |
| | | Report | | Referee: Patrick Maguire (Longford) |

| 19 March 2017 Round 5 | Wexford | 0-15 - 0-09 | London | Wexford |
| 13:00 | Ben Brosnan 0-11 (0-6f, 1 '45), Ciarán Lyng 0-2, P.J. Banville and Niall Hughes 0-1 each | Report | Rory Mason 0-7 (0-4f), Liam Gavaghan and Dean Moore 0-1 each |

| 19 March 2017 Round 5 | Limerick | 2-11 - 0-15 | Leitrim | Newcastlewest |
| 14:00 |

| 19 March 2017 Round 5 | Westmeath | 0-19 - 0-14 | Wicklow | Cusack Park, Mullingar |
| 14:00 | John Heslin 0-10 (0-6f), Ger Egan 0-4, Alan Stone 0-2, Paul Sharry (1 '45), David Lynch, Tommy McDaniels 0-1 each. | Report | Seánie Furlong 0-8 (0-6f), Anto McLoughlin 0-2, Ross O'Brien, Darren Hayden, Paddy Byrne, Tommy Kelly 0-1 each | Referee: Sean Laverty (Antrim) |

==== Division 4 Round 6 ====
| 25 March 2017 Round 6 | Waterford | 0-8 - 0-14 | Limerick | Fraher Field, Dungarvan |
| 19:00 |

| 26 March 2017 Round 6 | Leitrim | 2-16 - 0-15 | London | Carrick-On-Shannon |
| 13:00 |

| 26 March 2017 Round 6 | Wexford | 0-9 - 3-24 | Westmeath | Wexford Park |
| 13:00 | | Report |

| 26 March 2017 Round 6 | Wicklow | 0-11 - 1-18 | Carlow | Aughrim |
| 15:00 |

==== Division 4 Round 7 ====
| 2 April 2017 Round 7 | Westmeath | 3-26 - 1-9 | London | Cusack Park, Mullingar |
| 13:00 | | Report |

| 2 April 2017 Round 7 | Leitrim | 1-13 - 2-8 | Waterford | Carrick-On-Shannon |
| 13:00 |

| 2 April 2017 Round 7 | Carlow | 2-14 - 1-7 | Wexford | Dr Cullen Park |
| 13:00 |

| 2 April 2017 Round 7 | Limerick | 2-13 - 2-09 | Wicklow | Newcastlewest |
| 13:00 |

=== Division 4 Final ===
| 8 April 2017; 3:00 pm Final | Westmeath | 2-24 - 2-11 | Wexford | Croke Park; Referee: Paul Faloon (Down); Man of the Match: Kieran Martin (Maryland) |
| 8 April 2017; 3:00 pm Final | John Heslin 0-8 (0-5f), Ger Egan 1-2 (1-0 pen), Shane Dempsey 1-1, Kieran Martin 0-4, Paul Sharry & Tommy McDaniels 0-3 each, John Connellan 0-2, Kelvin Reilly 0-1 | Report | Kevin O’Grady 1-1, Ciarán Lyng 0-4 (0-3f), Donal Shanley 1-2 (0-1f, 0-1 45), PJ Banville 0-2, Michael Furlong & Daithí Waters 0-1 each | Croke Park; Referee: Paul Faloon (Down); Man of the Match: Kieran Martin (Maryland) |

== League Statistics ==
- All scores correct as of 12 April 2017

=== Scoring Events ===
- Widest winning margin: 30
  - Armagh 6-22 – 0-10 Offaly (Division 3)
- Most goals in a match: 7
  - Galway 5-15 – 2-15 Derry (Division 2)
  - Offaly 3-15 – 4-11 Laois (Division 3)
- Most points in a match: 43
  - Dublin 2-29 – 0-14 Roscommon (Division 1)
- Most goals by one team in a match: 6
  - Armagh 6-22 – 0-10 Offaly (Division 3)
- Highest aggregate score: 51 points
  - Galway 5-15 – 2-15 Derry (Division 2)
- Lowest aggregate score: 14 points
  - Monaghan 0-07 – 0-07 Cavan (Division 1)

=== Top Scorer: Overall ===
| Rank | Player | County | Tally | Total | Matches | Average |
|---|---|---|---|---|---|---|
| 1 | John Heslin | Westmeath | 3-60 | 69 | 8 | 8.6 |
| 2 | Paul Geaney | Kerry | 3-42 | 51 | 8 | 6.4 |
| 3 | Conor Sweeney | Tipperary | 4-38 | 50 | 8 | 6.2 |
| 4 | Donal Kingston | Laois | 5-34 | 49 | 7 | 7 |
| 5 | Dean Rock | Dublin | 0-48 | 48 | 8 | 6 |
| 6 | Paul Broderick | Carlow | 3-35 | 44 | 6 | 7.3 |
| 7 | Robbie Smyth | Longford | 0-39 | 39 | 7 | 5.6 |
| 8 | Seanie Furlong | Wicklow | 1-35 | 38 | 6 | 6.3 |
| 8 | Jack McCarron | Monaghan | 3-29 | 38 | 6 | 6.3 |
| 10 | Emlyn Mulligan | Leitrim | 1-33 | 36 | 7 | 5.1 |
| 11 | E Cleary | Clare | 1-31 | 34 | 7 | 4.9 |
| 12 | Donal Lenihan | Meath | 2-27 | 33 | 7 | 4.7 |
| 13 | Nigel Dunne | Offaly | 1-29 | 32 | 7 | 4.6 |
| 14 | Rory Mason | London | 1-28 | 31 | 6 | 5.2 |
| 14 | Ryan Burns | Louth | 3-22 | 31 | 8 | 3.9 |

=== Top Scorer: Single game ===
| Rank | Player | County | Tally | Total | Opposition |
|---|---|---|---|---|---|
| 1 | John Heslin | Westmeath | 1-11 | 14 | Leitrim |
| 2 | John Heslin | Westmeath | 1-10 | 13 | Wexford |
| 2 | Conor Sweeney | Tipperary | 2-07 | 13 | Longford |
| 2 | Donal Kingston | Laois | 3-04 | 13 | Offaly |
| 5 | Jack McCarron | Monaghan | 1-09 | 12 | Dublin |
| 5 | Paul Broderick | Carlow | 2-06 | 12 | Waterford |
| 7 | Colm O'Neill | Cork | 0-11 | 11 | Derry |
| 7 | Ben Brosnan | Wexford | 0-11 | 11 | London |
| 7 | Conor Sweeney | Tipperary | 2-05 | 11 | Louth |
| 10 | Paul Broderick | Carlow | 0-10 | 10 | Wicklow |
| 10 | John Heslin | Westmeath | 0-10 | 10 | Wicklow |
| 10 | C J McGourty | Antrim | 1-07 | 10 | Longford |
| 10 | Jack McCarron | Monaghan | 1-07 | 10 | Roscommon |
| 10 | Peter Harte | Tyrone | 2-04 | 10 | Kerry |
| 10 | Paul Geaney | Kerry | 2-04 | 10 | Donegal |
| 10 | Michael Quinlivan | Tipperary | 3-01 | 10 | Armagh |
