= List of All-Ireland Senior Football Championship winning players =

This is a list of male Gaelic footballers who have played on a winning team in the final of the All-Ireland Senior Football Championship.

In 2005, a gold medal won by the first final's man-of-the-match Malachi O'Brien fetched €26,500 (three times its guide price) at London auction house Sotheby's. It is believed to be the oldest All-Ireland football medal in existence.

== Winning players ==
Players are organised by year of first medal, then number of medals, then surname.

Player	Team	Finals won	Years	Notes
John Joe O'Reilly	Cavan	2	1947, 1948	Captain in 1947 and 1948
Sean Flanagan	Mayo	2	1950, 1951	Captain in 1950 and 1951
Mattie McDonagh	Galway	4	, 1956, 1964, 1965, 1966	
Enda Colleran	Galway	3	1964, 1965, 1966	Captain in 1965 and 1966
Pat Spillane	Kerry	8	1975, 1978, 1979, 1980, 1981, 1984, 1985, 1986	
Mikey Sheehy	Kerry	8	1975, 1978, 1979, 1980, 1981, 1984, 1985, 1986	
Páidí Ó Sé	Kerry	8	1975, 1978, 1979, 1980, 1981, 1984, 1985, 1986	
Ogie Moran	Kerry	8	1975, 1978, 1979, 1980, 1981, 1984, 1985, 1986	
Ger Power	Kerry	8	1975, 1978, 1979, 1980, 1981, 1984, 1985, 1986	
Jack O'Shea	Kerry	7	1978, 1979, 1980, 1981, 1984, 1985, 1986	
Dan O'Keeffe	Kerry	7	1931, 1932, 1937, 1939, 1940, 1941, 1946	
Eoin Liston	Kerry	7	1978, 1979, 1980, 1981, 1984, 1985, 1986	
Charlie Nelligan	Kerry	7	1978, 1979, 1980, 1981, 1984, 1985, 1986	
Mick Spillane	Kerry	7	1978, 1979, 1980, 1981, 1984, 1985, 1986	
Seán Walsh	Kerry	7	1978, 1979, 1980, 1981, 1984, 1985, 1986	
Paddy Andrews	Dublin	5	2013, 2015, 2016, 2017, 2018	
Jonny Cooper	Dublin	7	2013, 2015, 2016, 2017, 2018, 2019, 2020	
Darren Daly	Dublin	1	2013	
Cormac Costello	Dublin	8	2013, 2015, 2016, 2017, 2018, 2019, 2020, 2023	
Ciarán Kilkenny	Dublin	8	2013, 2015, 2016, 2017, 2018, 2019, 2020, 2023	
Paul Mannion	Dublin	7	2013, 2016, 2017, 2018, 2019, 2020, 2023	
Jack McCaffrey	Dublin	6	2013, 2015, 2017, 2018, 2019, 2023	
Dean Rock	Dublin	8	2013, 2015, 2016, 2017, 2018, 2019, 2020, 2023	
Ryan Bradley	Donegal	1	2012	
Paul Durcan	Donegal	1	2012	
Neil Gallagher	Donegal	1	2012	
Rory Kavanagh	Donegal	1	2012	
Karl Lacey	Donegal	1	2012	
Patrick McBrearty	Donegal	1	2012	
Martin McElhinney	Donegal	1	2012	
Colm McFadden	Donegal	1	2012	
Eamon McGee	Donegal	1	2012	
Neil McGee	Donegal	1	2012	
Frank McGlynn	Donegal	1	2012	
Paddy McGrath	Donegal	1	2012	
Mark McHugh	Donegal	1	2012	
Leo McLoone	Donegal	1	2012	
Dermot Molloy	Donegal	1	2012	
Michael Murphy	Donegal	1	2012	Captain and man of the match in 2012
Anthony Thompson	Donegal	1	2012	
Christy Toye	Donegal	1	2012	
David Walsh	Donegal	1	2012	
Denis Bastick	Dublin	2	2011, 2013	
Ger Brennan	Dublin	2	2011, 2013	
Bernard Brogan	Dublin	2	2011, 2013	
Stephen Cluxton	Dublin	9	2011, 2013, 2015, 2016, 2017, 2018, 2019, 2020, 2023	Captain in 2013, 2015, 2016, 2017, 2018, 2019, 2020
Diarmuid Connolly	Dublin	2	2011, 2013	
Paul Flynn	Dublin	2	2011, 2013	
Michael Darragh MacAuley	Dublin	8	2011, 2013, 2015, 2016, 2017, 2018, 2019, 2020	Man of the match in 2013
James McCarthy	Dublin	9	2011, 2013, 2015, 2016, 2017, 2018, 2019, 2020, 2023	Captain in 2023
Philly McMahon	Dublin	8	2011, 2013, 2015, 2016, 2017, 2018, 2019, 2020	
Kevin McManamon	Dublin	8	2011, 2013, 2015, 2016, 2017, 2018, 2019, 2020	
Rory O'Carroll	Dublin	2	2011, 2013	
Cian O'Sullivan	Dublin	8	2011, 2013, 2015, 2016, 2017, 2018, 2019, 2020	
Alan Brogan	Dublin	1	2011	
Barry Cahill	Dublin	1	2011	
Bryan Cullen	Dublin	1	2011	Captain in 2011
Eamonn Fennell	Dublin	1	2011	
Michael Fitzsimons	Dublin	9	2011, 2013, 2015, 2016, 2017, 2018, 2019, 2020, 2023	Man of the Match in 2016
Kevin Nolan	Dublin	1	2011	Man of the match in 2011
Eoghan O'Gara	Dublin	1	2011	
Eoin Cadogan	Cork	1	2010	
Graham Canty	Cork	1	2010	Named as captain in 2010, then failed to start but came on as a substitute
Ray Carey	Cork	1	2010	
Daniel Goulding	Cork	1	2010	Man of the match in 2010
John Hayes	Cork	1	2010	
Derek Kavanagh	Cork	1	2010	
Paddy Kelly	Cork	1	2010	
Paul Kerrigan	Cork	1	2010	
Paudie Kissane	Cork	1	2010	
John Miskella	Cork	1	2010	
Nicholas Murphy	Cork	1	2010	
Alan O'Connor	Cork	1	2010	
Donncha O'Connor	Cork	1	2010	
Noel O'Leary	Cork	1	2010	
Colm O'Neill	Cork	1	2010	
Pearse O'Neill	Cork	1	2010	
Alan Quirke	Cork	1	2010	
Ciarán Sheehan	Cork	1	2010	
Michael Shields	Cork	1	2010	
Aidan Walsh	Cork	1	2010	
Tadhg Kennelly	Kerry	1	2009	
David Moran	Kerry	1	2009	
Micheál Quirke	Kerry	1	2009	
Donnacha Walsh	Kerry	1	2009	
Colm Cavanagh	Tyrone	1	2008	
Colm McCullagh	Tyrone	1	2008	
Tommy McGuigan	Tyrone	1	2008	
Justin McMahon	Tyrone	1	2008	
Martin Penrose	Tyrone	1	2008	
Séamus Scanlon	Kerry	2	2007, 2009	
Killian Young	Kerry	2	2007, 2009	
Pádraig Reidy	Kerry	1	2007	
Kieran Donaghy	Kerry	3	2006, 2007, 2009	
Seán O'Sullivan	Kerry	2	2006, 2007	
Bryan Sheehan	Kerry	2	2006, 2007	
David Harte	Tyrone	2	2005, 2008	
Pascal McConnell	Tyrone	2	2005, 2008	
Joe McMahon	Tyrone	2	2005, 2008	
Ryan Mellon	Tyrone	2	2005, 2008	
Michael McGee	Tyrone	1	2005	
Colm Cooper	Kerry	4	2004, 2006, 2007, 2009	
Paul Galvin	Kerry	4	2004, 2006, 2007, 2009	
Diarmuid Murphy	Kerry	4	2004, 2006, 2007, 2009	
Aidan O'Mahony	Kerry	4	2004, 2006, 2007, 2009	
Marc Ó Sé	Kerry	4	2004, 2006, 2007, 2009	
Declan O'Sullivan	Kerry	4	2004, 2006, 2007, 2009	Captain in 2006 and 2007
Eoin Brosnan	Kerry	3	2004, 2006, 2007	
Brendan Guiney	Kerry	2	2004, 2006	
Paddy Kelly	Kerry	1	2004	
Ronan O'Connor	Kerry	1	2004	
Sean Cavanagh	Tyrone	3	2003, 2005, 2008	
Brian Dooher	Tyrone	3	2003, 2005, 2008	Captain in 2005 and 2008
Conor Gormley	Tyrone	3	2003, 2005, 2008	
Colin Holmes	Tyrone	3	2003, 2005, 2008	
Philip Jordan	Tyrone	3	2003, 2005, 2008	
Enda McGinley	Tyrone	3	2003, 2005, 2008	
Brian McGuigan	Tyrone	3	2003, 2005, 2008	
Ryan McMenamin	Tyrone	3	2003, 2005, 2008	
Owen Mulligan	Tyrone	3	2003, 2005, 2008	
Stephen O'Neill	Tyrone	3	2003, 2005, 2008	
Peter Canavan	Tyrone	2	2003, 2005	Captain in 2003
Kevin Hughes	Tyrone	2	2003, 2008	
Martin O'Connell	Meath	3	1987, 1988, 1996,	Named on the Team of the Millenium
Chris Lawn	Tyrone	2	2003, 2005	
John Devine	Tyrone	1	2003	Also named to start in goal in 2008 but withdrew the night before due to the death of his father
Gerard Cavlan	Tyrone	1	2003	
Gavin Devlin	Tyrone	1	2003	Unused sub in 2005
Ciaran Gourley	Tyrone	1	2003	
Cormac McAnallen	Tyrone	1	2003	
Francie Bellew	Armagh	1	2002	
Rónán Clarke	Armagh	1	2002	
Diarmaid Marsden	Armagh	1	2002	
Oisín McConville	Armagh	1	2002	
Steven McDonnell	Armagh	1	2002	
John McEntee	Armagh	1	2002	
Kieran McGeeney	Armagh	1	2002	Captain in 2002
Paul McGrane	Armagh	1	2002	
Enda McNulty	Armagh	1	2002	
Justin McNulty	Armagh	1	2002	
Aidan O'Rourke	Armagh	1	2002	
Joe Bergin	Galway	1	2001	
Kieran Fitzgerald	Galway	1	2001	
Alan Keane	Galway	1	2001	
Alan Kerins	Galway	1	2001	
Declan Meehan	Galway	1	2001	
Tomás Ó Sé	Kerry	5	2000, 2004, 2006, 2007, 2009	
Tom O'Sullivan	Kerry	5	2000, 2004, 2006, 2007, 2009	
Tommy Griffin	Kerry	4	2000, 2006, 2007, 2009	
Michael McCarthy	Kerry	4	2000, 2004, 2006, 2009	
Éamonn Fitzmaurice	Kerry	3	2000, 2004, 2006	
Mike Hassett	Kerry	1	2000	
Noel Kennelly	Kerry	1	2000	
Aodán Mac Gearailt	Kerry	1	2000	
Seán Óg De Paor	Galway	2	1998, 2001	
Michael Donnellan	Galway	2	1998, 2001	
Gary Fahey	Galway	2	1998, 2001	Captain in 2001
Jarlath Fallon	Galway	2	1998, 2001	
Pádraic Joyce	Galway	2	1998, 2001	
Derek Savage	Galway	2	1998, 2001	
Kevin Walsh	Galway	2	1998, 2001	
John Divilly	Galway	1	1998	
Martin McNamara	Galway	1	1998	
Ray Silke	Galway	1	1998	Captain in 1998
Darragh Ó Sé	Kerry	6	1997, 2000, 2004, 2006, 2007, 2009	Injured for 2004 final win
Mike Frank Russell	Kerry	5	1997, 2000, 2004, 2006, 2007	
Seamus Moynihan	Kerry	4	1997, 2000, 2004, 2006	Captain in 2000
Johnny Crowley	Kerry	3	1997, 2000, 2004	
Liam Hassett	Kerry	3	1997, 2000, 2004	Captain in 1997
Dara Ó Cinnéide	Kerry	3	1997, 2000, 2004	Captain in 2004
Donal Daly	Kerry	2	1997, 2000	
Maurice Fitzgerald	Kerry	2	1997, 2000	
William Kirby	Kerry	2	1997, 2004	
Declan O'Keeffe	Kerry	2	1997, 2000	
Eamonn Breen	Kerry	1	1997	
Killian Burns	Kerry	1	1997	Unused sub in 2000
Pa Laide	Kerry	1	1997	
Denis O'Dwyer	Kerry	1	1997	Unused sub in 2000
Liam O'Flaherty	Kerry	1	1997	
Barry O'Shea	Kerry	1	1997	
Billy O'Shea	Kerry	1	1997	
Stephen Stack	Kerry	1	1997	
Jack Walsh	Kerry	6	1924, 1926, 1929, 1930, 1931, 1932	
Anton O'Toole	Dublin	4	1974, 1976, 1977, 1983	

== See also ==
- List of All-Ireland Senior Hurling Championship medal winners
