= 2008 All-Ireland Senior Football Championship final =

2008 All-Ireland Football Championship final
- Event: 2008 All-Ireland Senior Football Championship
| Tyrone | Kerry |
| 1–15 (18) | 0–14 (14) |
- Date: 21 September 2008
- Venue: Croke Park, Dublin
- Referee: Maurice Deegan (Laois)
- Attendance: 82,204

The 2008 All-Ireland Senior Football Championship final was the 121st All-Ireland Final and the deciding match of the 2008 All-Ireland Senior Football Championship, an inter-county Gaelic football tournament for the top teams in Ireland.

== Pre-match ==
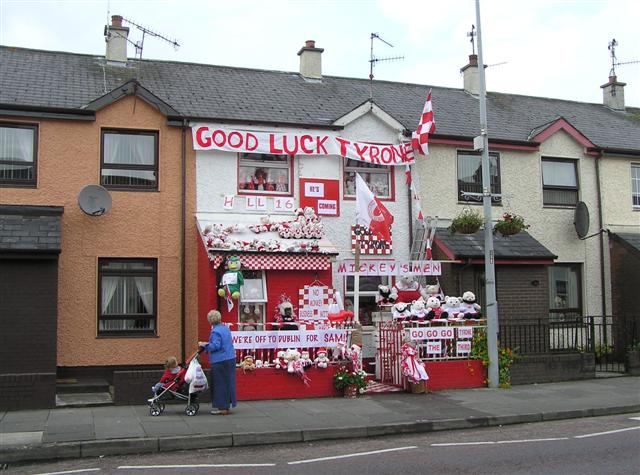
House decorated with Tyrone colours, Strabane, 2008

Kerry and Tyrone defined the decade. Since 2000, they had hoovered up titles in 2000, 2004, 2006, 2007 (Kerry) and 2003, 2005 (Tyrone). This led to Martin Breheny calling the 2008 final the "most decade-defining clash since Dublin v Kerry in the late 1970s".

2008 was the first final between two teams who had been beaten in their Provincial Championship. Kerry were reigning champions and were gunning for three-in-a-row. Tyrone had looked dead and buried after being knocked out of their Ulster SFC quarter-final by Down after extra-time in a replay, but had bounced back through the back door.

Tyrone had beaten Wexford in their semi-final, while Kerry had beaten Cork after a replay in their semi-final.

== Match ==
=== Summary ===
Tyrone beat Kerry by four points to claim their third All-Ireland SFC title.

=== Details ===
21 September 2008
Final

| Kerry | 0–14 – 1–15 | Tyrone |
|---|---|---|
| C Cooper 0–6 (3f), B Sheehan 0–2 (2f), Declan O'Sullivan 0–2, T Walsh, Darren O'Sullivan, T Ó Sé, D Ó Sé 0–1 each | Report | S Cavanagh 0–5, T McGuigan 1–1 (1f), B Dooher 0–2, C McCullagh 0–1 (1f), D Harte, E McGinley, M Penrose, R Mellon, K Hughes, C Cavanagh 0–1 each |

Croke Park, Dublin

Kerry
Tyrone

Tyrone =

- 16 P. McConnell
- 2 R. McMenamin
- 3 Justin McMahon
- 12 Joe McMahon
- 5 D. Harte
- 6 C. Gormley
- 7 P. Jordan
- 8 C. Holmes
- 9 E. McGinley
- 10 B. Dooher (c)
- 29 M. Penrose
- 25 R. Mellon
- 13 T. McGuigan
- 14 S. Cavanagh
- 15 C. McCullagh

Substitutes used
Stephen O'Neill* for McCullagh (25')
K. Hughes for Holmes (half-time)
B. McGuigan for Penrose (51')
O. Mulligan for Mellon (57')
C. Cavanagh for T. McGuigan (68')

Substitutes not used
J. Curran
D. Carlin
P. Donnelly
N. Gormley
C. McCarron
D. McCaul
M. McGee
C. Gourley
R. Mulgrew
O. Mulligan
Shaun O'Neill
P. J. Quinn
P. Quinn*

Manager
M. Harte

Notes: J Devine was on the starting lineup but had to withdraw from the squad due to a family bereavement.
Stephen O'Neill's name was not in the match program due to there only being space for thirty names. He played, and came on as a substitute with the number 31 on his back.
Paul Quinn's name was not in the match program due to there only being space for thirty names.

Kerry =

- 1 D. Murphy
- 2 M. Ó Sé
- 3 T. O'Sullivan
- 4 P. Reidy
- 5 T. Ó Sé (c)
- 6 A. O'Mahony
- 7 K. Young
- 8 D. Ó Sé
- 9 S. Scanlon
- 10 B. Sheehan
- 11 Declan O'Sullivan
- 12 E. Brosnan
- 13 C. Cooper
- 14 K. Donaghy
- 15 T. Walsh

Subs used
28 P. Galvin for T. Walsh
19 Darran O'Sullivan for E. Brosnan
17 T. Griffin for S. Scanlon
23 M. F. Russell for B. Sheehan
27 D. Moran for B. Sheehan

Subs not used
16 K. Cremin
18 S. O'Sullivan
20 M. Quirke
21 D. Walsh
22 D. Bohane
24 R. Ó Flatharta
25 P. O'Connor
26 K. O'Leary
29 A. Maher
30 P. Corridan
31 M. Moloney
32 K. Quirke
33 A.O'Shea

Manager
P. O'Shea
