= 2011 All-Ireland Senior Football Championship final =

2011 All-Ireland Football Championship final
- Event: 2011 All-Ireland Senior Football Championship
Dublin	Kerry
1–12 (15)	1–11 (14)
- Date: 18 September 2011
- Venue: Croke Park, Dublin
- Man of the Match: Kevin Nolan
- Referee: Joe McQuillan (Cavan)
- Attendance: 82,300
- Weather: Sunny/Overcast; 15 °C (59 °F)

The 2011 All-Ireland Football Championship final was the 124th event of its kind. It was the culmination of Gaelic football's premier competition, the All-Ireland Senior Football Championship, and was played between Kerry and Dublin on 18 September 2011 at Croke Park, Dublin.

Dublin were victorious by a single point, achieving their first All-Ireland Senior Football Championship title since 1995. This was the first Kerry–Dublin final since 1985. History was made as the winning point was scored by a goalkeeper, Stephen Cluxton of Dublin, the first time this had ever happened in the final. Cluxton's point gave the title to Dublin as, with the teams level, the match would have had to be replayed at a later date had it ended with both teams on the same score. RTÉ called it "one of the most gripping Sam Maguire Cup deciders of the modern era" and the BBC said it was a "dramatic comeback victory."

Going into the 2011 Championship Cork were the defending champions after defeating Down in the 2010 final. However, Cork were eliminated in the quarter-finals in 2011 by Mayo. On 30 August 2011, Joe McQuillan was confirmed as the referee for the senior final. This was his first time to referee an All Ireland Senior Football final. Ahead of the game, Irish politicians Leo Varadkar and Aodhán Ó Ríordáin were censured by officials for flying unauthorised flags from their car windows in public. The flags favoured the Dublin team. After the game, Dublin captain Bryan Cullen was offered the role of coaching Leinster Rugby's academy players.

The 2011 All-Ireland Senior Football Championship Final attracted an audience share of almost 75 per cent, with three quarters of the available audience watching the final from beginning to end. This compared with an audience share of just over 65 per cent who watched the shock Ireland victory over Australia at the 2011 Rugby World Cup in New Zealand the previous day. In 2018, Martin Breheny listed this as the twelfth greatest All-Ireland Senior Football Championship Final.

== Paths to the final ==
Kerry defeated Tipperary, Limerick and Cork to win the Munster Senior Football Championship. They went on to defeat Limerick for a second time in the All-Ireland Quarter final and then Mayo in the semi-final.

Dublin defeated Laois, Kildare and Wexford to win the Leinster Senior Football Championship. They went on to defeat Tyrone in the All Ireland Quarter-final and Donegal in the semi-final. The Donegal versus Dublin football semi-final had the largest crowd attendance of the season prior to the final (81,436).

== History ==
This was the 12th time Kerry and Dublin met in an All-Ireland football final and the first since 1985. Kerry had won eight of the previous meetings, and Dublin had won three.

Kerry are the most successful Gaelic football team taking part in the All-Ireland Senior Football Championship, having previously won 36 and taken part in 55 All Ireland Football finals since the competition's inception in 1887. Dublin are the second most successful team, having won 22 and taken part in 35 finals prior to this match.

The first senior final meeting between Dublin and Kerry was in 1892. Dublin defeated Kerry in the 1923 final but would not do so again until the 1976 final. The 1970s was a particularly important time in the history of the rivalry between the sides due to the regularity with which the teams encountered one another. In the decade before the 2011 final Dublin and Kerry had met on five occasions, with Kerry regularly dispatching Dublin aside with ease. Their previous meeting (in the quarter-finals of the 2009 championship) saw Kerry defeat Dublin by 17 points.

== Pre-match ==
=== Team selection ===
On 13 September 2011, Kerry manager, Jack O'Connor named an unchanged team from that which had played Mayo in the semi-final. There was some concern that Eoin Brosnan would be unable to play following an ankle injury, but he had recovered sufficiently to be named on the starting team. Three days later, Pat Gilroy, the Dublin Manager, named his starting 15, which also featured no changes since their semi final match against Donegal. Following a red card for striking Donegal player Marty Boyle in the semi-final, Dublin's Diarmuid Connolly was initially ineligible to play in the final. Having appealed this decision to the CHC, he was, however, cleared to play.

=== Minors ===
Prior to the senior final, Tipperary defeated Dublin in the minor final to take their first minor football title since 1934, it was an extraordinary 3–09 to 1–14 comeback after the Dublin minors appeared to have them dead and buried with Tipperary coming from six points behind at one stage in the second half.

== Match ==
=== Summary ===
==== First half ====
Kerry were the first team to score, after just two minutes of the match, with Declan O'Sullivan fisting the ball over the bar. Nine minutes later, after several wides from both sides, Alan Brogan curled a shot inside the upright to equalise. Paul Flynn was booked for a high challenge on Aidan O'Mahony a minute later. In the 15th minute, Alan Brogan scored his second point of the match to give Dublin the lead. Two minutes later, Darren O'Sullivan broke through the Dublin defence and offloaded the ball to Colm Cooper who put it past Stephen Cluxton to score a goal for Kerry. With the score at Kerry 1-01 – 0-02 Dublin, Bernard Brogan got his first point of the day from a free. In the 24th minute, Rory O'Carroll was given a yellow card for an off-the-ball incident with Darren O'Sullivan. A minute later, Kerry made their first substitution, bringing on Paul Galvin for corner-forward Kieran O'Leary. In the 28th minute, goalkeeper Stephen Cluxton scored for Dublin from a free and then Bernard Brogan scored his second and third points, giving Dublin a two-point lead. Substitute Galvin then scored his first point, leaving the score Kerry 1-02 – 0-06 Dublin at half time.

==== Second half ====
Three minutes into the second half, Kerry midfielder, Bryan Sheehan was given a yellow card for an unfair challenge on Michael Darragh MacAuley. Bernard Brogan scored the free from a relatively easy position. Two minutes later, Brogan combined with Denis Bastick to give Bastick his first point of the afternoon. In the 42nd minute, Sheehan was fouled 15m out from goal, giving Kerry their first score of the half. They followed this up with a fisted point from Kieran Donaghy a minute later, and a free from Colm Cooper after Ger Brennan was booked for fouling Declan O'Sullivan. Six minutes later, Sheehan went around three men to score another Kerry point and leave the score at Kerry 1-06 – 0-08 Dublin. At this point, both sides made a substitution. For Dublin, Kevin McManamon came on for Paul Flynn and for Kerry, Barry John Keane came on for Donnacha Walsh. The teams swapped frees, with Sheehan scoring at one end and Brogan at the other. In the 56th minute, Sheehan scored another free and Dublin introduced Eoghan O'Gara, replacing Barry Cahill. Cooper then scored another free and another point from play to give Kerry a 4-point lead with 10 minutes left in the match. In the 64th minute, Alan Brogan fed the ball through to McManamon, who rounded his marker and put the ball past goalkeeper, Brendan Kealy for a Dublin goal and to reduce the gap to a single point. A minute later, Kevin Nolan scored the equaliser and in the 68th minute, Bernard Brogan put Dublin a point ahead. Entering injury time, Kieran Donaghy levelled the scores again with a point from 35 metres out. With seconds left on the clock, McManamon was fouled leaving Stephen Cluxton to convert a free kick to make Dublin All-Ireland champions for the 23rd time.

=== Details ===
18 September 2011
16:00 UTC+1

Dublin	1–12 – 1–11	Kerry
Bernard Brogan (0-06, 4f); Kevin McManaman (1-00); Stephen Cluxton (0-02, 2f); Alan Brogan (0-02); Kevin Nolan (0-01); Denis Bastick (0-01)	Report	Colm Cooper (1-03, 2f); Bryan Sheehan (0-04, 2f, 1 '45); Kieran Donaghy (0-02); Declan O'Sullivan 0-01; Paul Galvin 0-01

Croke Park, Dublin
Attendance: 82,300
Referee: Joe McQuillan (Cavan)

Dublin	Kerry

GK	1	Stephen Cluxton
CB	2	Michael Fitzsimons
FB	3	Rory O'Carroll	(yellow card) 23'
CB	4	Cian O'Sullivan	(yellow card) 61'
WB	5	James McCarthy	(substituted off) 46'
HB	6	Ger Brennan	(yellow card) 44'
WB	7	Kevin Nolan
MF	8	Denis Bastick	(substituted off) 63'
MF	9	Michael Darragh MacAuley
WF	10	Paul Flynn	(yellow card) 12' (substituted off) 51'
HF	11	Barry Cahill	(substituted off) 57'
WF	12	Bryan Cullen (c)
CF	13	Alan Brogan
FF	14	Diarmuid Connolly
CF	15	Bernard Brogan
Substitutes:
FF	20	Eoghan O'Gara	(substituted on) 57'
CB	21	Philly McMahon	(substituted on) 46'
FF	24	Kevin McManamon	(substituted on) 51'	(yellow card) 56'
MF	25	Eamonn Fennell	(substituted on) 63'
Manager:
Pat Gilroy

GK	1	Brendan Kealy
CB	2	Killian Young
FB	3	Marc Ó Sé
CB	4	Tom O'Sullivan
WB	5	Tomás Ó Sé
HB	6	Eoin Brosnan	(substituted off) 63'
WB	7	Aidan O'Mahony	(yellow card) 22'
MF	8	Anthony Maher
MF	9	Bryan Sheehan	(yellow card) 39'
WF	10	Darran O'Sullivan
HF	11	Declan O'Sullivan
WF	12	Donnacha Walsh	(substituted off) 51'
CF	13	Colm Cooper (c)
FF	14	Kieran Donaghy
CF	15	Kieran O'Leary	(substituted off) 24'
Substitutes:
WB	17	Daniel Bohane	(substituted on) 63'
WF	18	Paul Galvin	(substituted on) 24'
CF	21	Barry John Keane	(substituted on) 51'
Manager:
Jack O'Connor

Man of the Match:
Kevin Nolan

Linesmen:
Pat McEnaney (Monaghan)
David Coldrick (Meath)

Sideline Official

Umpires
Tommy O'Reilly
Ciaran Brady
TP Gray
Jimmy Galligan

Dublin subs not used =
16 Michael Savage
17 Paul Conlon
18 Paul Casey
19 David Henry
22 Tomás Quinn
23 Sean Murray
26 Ross McConnell
27 Craig Dias
28 Declan Lally
29 Paul Brogan
30 Paul Griffin

Kerry subs not used
16 T. Mac a' tSaoir
19 S. Enright
20 J. O'Donoghue
22 P. Reidy
23 P. Crowley
24 T. Griffin
25 J. Buckley
26 B. McGuire
27 S. Scanlon
28 N. O'Mahony
29 D. Geaney
30 A. O'Connell
31 D. Casey

== Post-match ==
=== Trophy presentation ===
The trophy was presented from the Hogan Stand to Dublin captain Bryan Cullen by GAA president Christy Cooney. After the presentation the Dublin team and management went on a lap of honour around the Croke Park pitch. Along the way, they met former Dublin manager, Paul Caffrey, who was on duty in his capacity as a garda.

A Dublin fan also sneaked onto the pitch to celebrate. He put on Eamonn Fennell's discarded tracksuit top after joining the substitutes' bench and was seen on live television and in photographs.

=== Man of the match ===
Dublin's Kevin Nolan was named as the official GAA man of the match on RTÉ's The Sunday Game programme on the evening of the match. Other publications selected different players. For example, the Irish Independent selected Kevin McManamon.

=== Homecoming ===
On the evening of their victory, Lord Mayor of Dublin Andrew Montague invited the winning Dublin team to the Mansion House the following evening for a civic reception in their honour. The public was welcomed. An estimated 35,000 people turned up to the homecoming at Merrion Square.
