= 2011 All-Ireland Senior Football Championship =

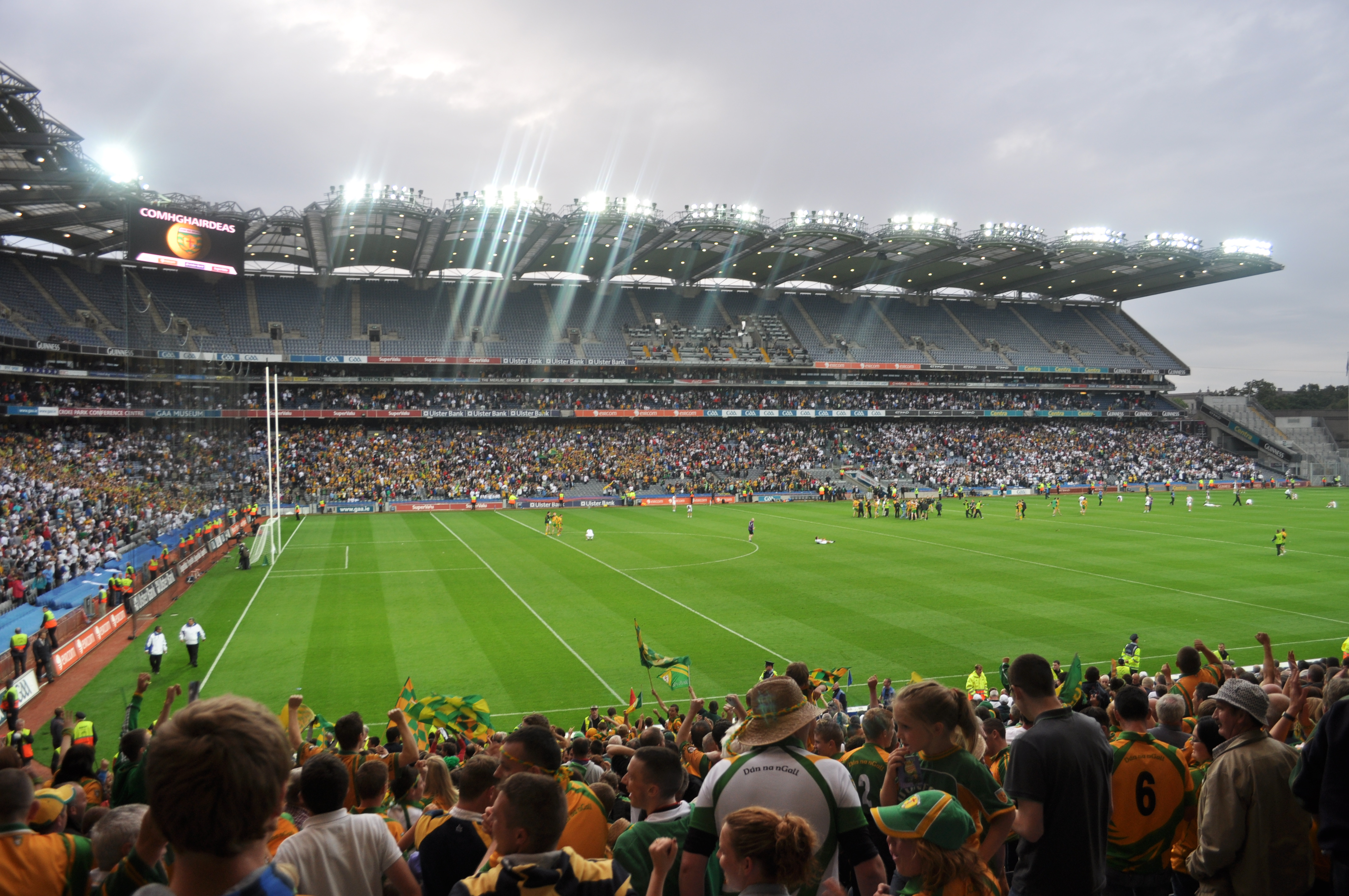

Championship details
- Dates: 1 May – 18 September 2011
- Teams: 33

All-Ireland Champions
- Winning team: Dublin (23rd win)
- Captain: Bryan Cullen
- Manager: Pat Gilroy

All-Ireland Finalists
- Losing team: Kerry
- Captain: Colm Cooper
- Manager: Jack O'Connor

Provincial Champions
- Munster: Kerry
- Leinster: Dublin
- Ulster: Donegal
- Connacht: Mayo

Championship statistics
- No. matches played: 61
- Goals total: 111 (1.82 per game)
- Points total: 1,528 (25.05 per game)
- Top Scorer: Colm Cooper (2–27)
- Player of the Year: Alan Brogan

The 2011 All-Ireland Senior Football Championship was the 125th edition of the GAA's premier inter-county Gaelic football tournament, played between 31 counties of Ireland (excluding Kilkenny who only take part in the hurling championship), London and New York. The draw for the 2011 championship took place on 7 October 2010. The 2011 All-Ireland Senior Football Championship Final took place at Croke Park on 18 September 2011, with Dublin winning their 23rd title.

Dublin and Donegal's All-Ireland semi-final in the 2011 championship was the lowest scoring in the era of 70-minute games (1975 onwards).

== Format ==
Four knockout (single elimination format) provincial championships were played. Kilkenny did not contest the football championship. London and New York competed in Connacht. The four provincial champions advanced to the All-Ireland quarter-finals.

- The sixteen teams eliminated before reaching a provincial semi-final competed in Round One of the Qualifiers (New York did not compete). The eight winners of Round One advanced to Round Two.
  - Qualifiers, Round Two: The eight teams eliminated in provincial semi-finals each played one of the eight winners of Round One.
  - Qualifiers, Round Three: The eight winners of Round Two played off to reduce the number to four.
  - Qualifiers, Round Four: The four teams eliminated in provincial finals each played one of the four winners of Round Three.
- All-Ireland Quarter-finals: The four provincial champions each played one of the four winners of Round Four.
- The winners of the All-Ireland Quarter-finals then advanced to the semi-finals, and the winners of the semi-finals went on to the 2011 All-Ireland Senior Football Championship Final.

== Fixtures and results ==
=== Munster Senior Football Championship ===
Quarter-finals
Cork	1–23
Clare	0–11
Kerry	2–16
Tipperary	0–11

Semi-finals
Cork	5–17
Waterford	2–08
Limerick	3–09
Kerry	1–26

Munster final
Kerry	1–15
Cork	1–12

3 July 2011
Final

Kerry	1–15 – 1–12	Cork
Declan O'Sullivan 0–5, Darran O'Sullivan 1–0, C Cooper (1f) B Sheehan, K Donaghy 0–2 each, K O'Leary, D Walsh, E Brosnan, J O'Donoghue 0–1 each	Report	D Goulding 0–5 (3f), D O'Connor 1–1 (1–0 pen), P Kerrigan 0–3, C Sheehan, A O'Connor, P Kelly 0–1 each

FitzGerald Stadium, Killarney
Attendance: 40,892
Referee: D Coldrick (Meath)

=== Leinster Senior Football Championship ===
Preliminary round
Kildare	0–12
Wicklow	0–5
Laois	0–10
Longford	0–9
Wexford	2–16
Offaly	0–8

Quarter-finals
Kildare	0–16
Meath	0–10
Laois	0–11
Dublin	1–16
Wexford	1–24
Westmeath	0–15
Carlow	0–14
Louth	0–13

Semi-finals
Kildare	1–11
Dublin	1–12
Wexford	4–12
Carlow	0–10

Leinster final
Wexford	1–12
Dublin	2–12

10 July 2011
2:00pm
Final

Wexford	1–12 – 2–12	Dublin
B Brosnan 0–9 (4f, 2 '45), R Barry 1–0, C Lyng 0–2, A Flynn 0–1	Report	J McCarthy 1–0, A Brogan, B Brogan (1f) 0–3 each, S Cluxton (1'45), D Bastick, P Flynn, B Cullen, K McMenamin, R McConnell 0–1 each, G Molloy 1–0 (o.g.)

Croke Park, Dublin
Attendance: 43,983
Referee: J Mc Quillan (Cavan)

=== Connacht Senior Football Championship ===
Quarter-finals
New York	1–11
Roscommon	3–21
Sligo	0–10
Leitrim	1–10
London	2–10
Mayo	0–19

Semi-finals
Roscommon	2–12
Leitrim	0–6
Galway	1–6
Mayo	1–12

Connacht final
Roscommon	0–11
Mayo	0–13

17 July 2011
2:00pm
Final

Roscommon	0–11 – 0–13	Mayo
D Shine (0-4fs, 0–1 '45) 0–8, D Ward, S Kilbride, C Cregg 0–1 each	Report	C O'Connor (0-8f) 0–8, P Gardiner, K McLoughlin, A Moran, A Dillon, E Varley 0–1 each

Dr. Hyde Park, Roscommon
Attendance: 25,609
Referee: M Collins (Cork)

=== Ulster Senior Football Championship ===
Preliminary round
Donegal	1–10
Antrim	0–7

Quarter-finals
Derry	1–18
Fermanagh	1–10
Armagh	1–15
Down	1–10
Tyrone	1–13
Monaghan	1–11
Cavan	1–8
Donegal	2–14

Semi-finals
Derry	3–14
Armagh	1–11
Tyrone	0–9
Donegal	2–6

Ulster final
Derry	0–08
Donegal	1–11

17 July 2011
4:00pm
Final

Derry	0–08 – 1–11	Donegal
J Kielt 0-04 (2f), C Kielt 0-02, C Gilligan (f), M Donaghy 0-01 each	Report	M Murphy 1-02 (1-00 pen), C McFadden 0-04 (2f), M Hegarty, A Thompson 0-02 each, R Bradley 0-01

St. Tiernach's Park, Clones
Attendance: 28,364
Referee: M Deegan (Laois)

=== All-Ireland qualifiers ===
==== Round 1 ====
On 12 June 2011, the draw was made for the first round of the All Ireland Qualifiers. This draw contained all the teams who had been knocked out of their provincial competitions prior to the semi-final stage, apart from New York.

25 June 2011 Round 1	Clare	1–12 – 1–13	Down	Cusack Park, Ennis
3:00pm	D Tubridy 0–4 (3f), T Ryan 1–0, J Dowling, G Quinlan 0–2 each, A Clohessy, John Hayes, G Brennan, M Tubridy 0–1 each	Report	C Laverty 1–3, P McComiskey 0–4 (2f), M Clarke 0–2 (2fs), B McArdle, C Mooney, M Poland, B Coulter 0–1 each	Attendance: 1,640; Referee: P O'Sullivan (Kerry)

25 June 2011 Round 1	Laois	2–16 – 0–11	Tipperary	O'Moore Park, Portlaoise
7:00pm	MJ Tierney 0–5 (3 '45s'), D Strong 1–2, C Begley 1–1, R Munnelly, D Kingston(2fs) 0–3 each, J O'Loughlin 0–2	Report	B Grogan 0-4f, B Mulvihill 0–2, G Hannigan, S Grogan, H Coghlan, J Cagney; P Austin 0–1 each	Attendance: 2,105; Referee: M Condron (Waterford)

25 June 2011 Round 1	Antrim	0–16 – 1–7	Westmeath	Casement Park, Belfast
2:00pm	T McCann 0–4 (2f, 2'45'), G O'Boyle 0–3 (2f), J Loughrey, B Herron, T Scullion 0–2 each, C Murray, K Niblock, P Cunningham 0–1 each	Report	J Heslin 0–4 (3f), J Dolan 1–0, B Murtagh, P Greville (f), D Dolan 0–1 each.	Attendance: 4,000; Referee: M Sludden (Tyrone)

25 June 2011 Round 1	Louth	2–8 – 5–8	Meath	Breffni Park, Cavan
7:00pm	D Clarke 1–8 (0-7f), P Keenan 1–0 (pen)	Report	C Ward 4–3 (0-3f), S O'Rourke 0–3, P Gilsenan 1–0, G Reilly, J Sheridan 0–1 each	Attendance: 18,243; Referee: M Deegan (Laois)

25 June 2011 Round 1	London	0–15 – 0–9	Fermanagh	Emerald GAA Grounds, Ruislip
1:30pm	E O'Neill 0–4 (2f), K O'Leary, P McGoldrick, C McCallion 0–2 each, P Geraghty, M Gottsche, T Gaughan, K Phair, C O'Sullivan 0–1 each	Report	J O'Flanaghan 0–5 (2f), D Kille (1f) 0–2, T Corrigan, B Og Maguire 0–1 each	Attendance: 1,200; Referee: D Fahy (Longford)

25 June 2011 Round 1	Cavan	0–11 – 2–16	Longford	Breffni Park, Cavan
5:00pm	E Keating 0–4 (1f), S Johnston 0–3 (2f), J McEnroe, M McKeever, Michael Brennan (45), N McDermott (1f) 0–1 each	Report	S McCormack 0–9 (7f), P Barden 1–3, B Kavanagh 1–2, B McElvaney, C Smith 0–1 each	Attendance: 18,243; Referee: M Duffy (Sligo)

25 June 2011 Round 1	Wicklow	1–18 – 0–16	Sligo	Aughrim County Ground, Aughrim
5:00pm	C McGraynor 1–1, T Hannon 0–4 (1f, 2 '45s'), L Glynn (1f), S Furlong (1f) 0–3 each, N Mernagh, J Stafford 0–2 each, D Hayden, R Finn, P Earls 0–1 each	Report	A Marren 0–9 (7f), T Taylor 0–3, E O'Hara, B Egan, M Breheny, S Coen 0–1 each	Attendance: 3,500; Referee: E Kinsella (Laois)

25 June 2011 Round 1	Offaly	1–18 – 1–10	Monaghan	O'Connor Park, Tullamore
7:00pm	N McNamee 1–4, C McManus 0–4 (3f), R Dalton 0–3, S Lonergan 0–2, K Casey, B Allen, N Darby, R Brady (f), D Egan 0–1 each	Report	C McGuinness 1–0, P Finlay (2f), O Duffy, N McAdam, C McManus (1f) 0–2 each, B O'Brien, C Hanratty 0–1 each	Attendance: 3,600; Referee: S Doyle (Wexford)

==== Round 2 ====
On 26 June 2011, the draw for Round 2 took place in Castlebar. This consisted of the winners of round one and losers of provincial semi-finals. Home advantage was given to the team drawn first.

9 July 2011 Round 2	Limerick	3–13 – 0–15	Offaly	Gaelic Grounds, Limerick
2:00pm	I Ryan 1–7, G Collins 1–2, S O'Carroll 1–0, S Kelly 0–2 (2f), Thomas Lee, E O'Connor 0–1 each	Report	C McManus 0–7 (7f), K Casey, N McNamee 0–2 each, B Darby, N Darby, B Allen, P Bracken 0–1 each	Attendance: 3,500; Referee: M Condon (Waterford)

9 July 2011 Round 2	Down	1–16 – 1–8	Leitrim	Páirc Esler, Newry
3:00pm	B Coulter 0–7, M Clarke 1–2 (1-0pen, 1'45), C Laverty, M Poland (1f) 0–2 each, K McKernan, L Doyle, P Fitzpatrick 0–1 each	Report	A Croal 1–1, E Mulligan 0–3 (3fs), R Lowe, B McDonald, J Glancy, C Kelly 0–1 each	Attendance: 6,000; Referee: M Sludden (Tyrone)

9 July 2011 Round 2	Laois	0–10 – 3–16	Kildare	O'Moore Park, Portlaoise
7:00pm	D Kingston 0–3 (2f), N Donoher, MJ Tierney (2f) 0–2 each, P Clancy, B Quigley, R Munnelly 0–1 each	Report	J Doyle 1–4 (1 pen, 4f), J Kavanagh 1–1, T O'Connor 1–0, H Lynch 0–3, P O'Neill, E O'Flaherty (1 '45) 0–2 each, O Lyons, E Callaghan, F Dowling, B Flanagan 0–1 each	Attendance: 11,395; Referee: D Coldrick (Meath)

9 July 2011 Round 2	Longford	0–15 – 1–17	Tyrone	Pearse Park, Longford
7:15pm	S McCormack 0–6 (2f), F McGee, B Kavanagh 0–3 each, N Farrell, D McElligott, P Barden 0–1 each	Report	P Harte 0–7 (1f), M Donnelly 1–2, S Cavanagh (2f), C Cavanagh, M Penrose (1f) 0–2 each, K Coney, T McGuigan 0–1 each	Attendance: 7,120; Referee: P Mc Enaney (Monaghan)

9 July 2011 Round 2	Armagh	0–19 – 2–13; A.E.T.	Wicklow	Athletic Grounds, Armagh
7:00pm	J Clarke 0–5, S McDonnell 0–4 (1f, 1'45), A Kernan, M Mackin 0–3 each, C Vernon, M O'Rourke, J Hanratty, G McParland 0–1 each	Report	S Furlong 2–4 (3f), L Glynn 0–4, T Hannon 0–3 (1f, 1'45), J Stafford, N Mernagh 0–1 each	Attendance: 6,491; Referee: P Fox (Westmeath)

9 July 2011 Round 2	Meath	0–11 – 0–10	Galway	Páirc Tailteann, Navan
7:10pm	S Bray 0–3, G O'Brien, S McAnarney, S O'Rourke, B Meade, J Sheridan, G Reilly, B Farrell, C Ward (f) 0–1 each	Report	P Joyce 0–4 (1f), C Bane 0–3 (1f), J Duane, G Bradshaw, M Clancy 0–1 each	Attendance: 17,000; Referee: M Collins (Cork)

9 July 2011 Round 2	Antrim	1–13 – 2–9	Carlow	Casement Park, Belfast
3:00pm	M Dougan 1–1, P Cunningham 0–3 (0-1f), C Murray, T McCann (0-1f), J Loughrey, K Niblock 0–2 each, G O'Boyle 0–1 (0-1sl)	Report	D St Ledger 0–4 (0-3f, 0–1 '45'), P Hickey, B Murphy 1–0 each, D Foley 0–3 (0-2f), T Walsh, B Murphy (0-1f) 0–1 each	Referee: E Kinsella (Laois)

9 July 2011 Round 2	London	0–13 – 1–17	Waterford	Emerald GAA Grounds, Ruislip
6:30pm	T Gaughan, E O'Neill (3f) 0–3 each, K Phair 0-2f, P Geraghty, S McVeigh, P McGoldrick (1f), S Kelly (1f), M Gottsche ('45') 0–1 each	Report	P Whyte 0–7 (4f), G Hurney 1–3, W Hennessy 0–3, S Fleming, B Wall (2f) 0–2 each	Attendance: 3,000; Referee: S Doyle (Wexford)

16 July 2011 Round 2 replay	Wicklow	0–10 – 2–9	Armagh	Aughrim County Ground, Aughrim
7.00pm	T Hannon 0–3 (0-2f, 0–1 '45'), P Earls, L Glynn, S Furlong (0-1f) 0–2 each, A O'Malley 0–1	Report	J Clarke 2–2, M O'Rourke, S McDonnell (0-1f) 0–2 each, P Duffy, A Kernan (0-1f), G McParland 0–1 each	Attendance: 6,500; Referee: R Hickey (Clare)

==== Round 3 ====
On 10 July 2011, the draw for Rounds 3 and 4 took place. Round 3 consisted of the 8 winners of round two playing each other to reduce the number to 4. Round 4 consisted of losers of provincial finals playing the winners of Round 3. For Round 3, home advantage was given to the team drawn first, while Round 4 would be played at neutral venues.

16 July 2011 Round 3	Limerick	0–14 – 0–9	Waterford	Gaelic Grounds, Limerick
7.00pm	S Kelly 0–7 (3f), J Mullane, S O'Carroll, G Collins (1f) 0–2 each, J Cooke 0–1	Report	P Whyte 0–4 (2f), P Hurney 0–2, B Wall, S Fleming, G Hurney 0–1 each	Attendance: 2,385; Referee: C Reilly (Meath)

16 July 2011 Round 3	Antrim	0–10 – 3–13	Down	Casement Park, Belfast
7.00pm	B Herron, K Niblock, P Cunnighan (2f) 0–2 each, G O'Boyle, D O'Hagan, J Crozier, T McCann ('45') 0–1 each	Report	M Clarke 1–4 (3f, 1 '45'), M Poland 0–4 (4f), C Laverty, C Mooney 1–0 each, B Coulter 0–2, A Branagan, K McKernan, P McComiskey 0–1 each	Attendance: 9,500; Referee: P Hughes (Armagh)

16 July 2011 Round 3	Meath	0–14 – 2–11	Kildare	Páirc Tailteann, Navan
7.00pm	C Ward 0–9 (5f, 2 '45), S Kenny, S Bray 0–2 each, S O'Rourke 0–1	Report	E Bolton, J Doyle (1-2f) 1–2 each, H McGrillen, M O'Flaherty, P O'Neill, E Callaghan, F Dowling, J Kavanagh, R Sweeney 0–1 each	Attendance: 20,000; Referee: J Mc Quillan (Cavan)

23 July 2011 Round 3	Tyrone	2–13 – 0–13	Armagh	Healy Park, Omagh
7.00pm	T McGuigan 1–1, P Harte 0–4 (3f), Joe McMahon 1–0, M Donnelly 0–3, S O'Neill, S Cavanagh (1f), B McGuigan, K Coney 0–1 each	Report	S McDonnell 0–8 (5f, 1 pen), M O'Rourke 0–2, A Kernan (1f), B J Padden, M Mackin 0–1 each	Attendance: 13,682; Referee: M Duffy (Sligo)

==== Round 4 ====
23 July 2011 Round 4	Down	0–14 – 2–20	Cork	Croke Park, Dublin
6:00pm	M Clarke 0–3 (2f), B Coulter, P McComiskey 0–2 each, C Garvey, C Maginn, D Hughes, M Poland, K McKernan, A Rogers, C Laverty 0–1 each	Report	D O'Connor 1–7 (4f), F Goold 1–2, P Kerrigan 0–3, P Kelly 0–2, D Goulding 0–1 (1f), P Kissane, P O'Neill, G Canty, A Walsh, J Miskella 0–1 each	Attendance: 31,072; Referee: M Duffy (Sligo)

23 July 2011 Round 4	Limerick	1–18 – 1–17	Wexford	O'Moore Park, Portlaoise
7:00pm	I Ryan (1f), S Kelly (3f) 0-05 each, G Collins 0-04 (2f), E O'Connor 1–0, J Cooke 0-02, T Lee, S O'Carroll 0-01 each	Report	E Bradley 1–0, R Barry, PJ Banville, B Brosnan (2f) 0-03 each, A Morrissey, A Flynn, C Lyng (2f) 0-02 each, S Roche, B Malone 0-01 each	Attendance: 3,700; Referee: D Fahy (Longford)

23 July 2011 Round 4	Kildare	0–19 – 0–13	Derry	Croke Park, Dublin
4:00pm	J Doyle 0–6 (6f), J Kavanagh 0–4, R Kelly, T O'Connor 0–2 each, H McGrillen, E Callaghan, E O'Flaherty, P O'Neill, R Sweeney 0–1 each	Report	C Gilligan 0–4 (3f), D Mullan 0–3, S Leo McGoldrick, E. Muldoon, J Kielt (0-1f), J Diver, G O'Kane, B McGoldrick 0–1 each	Attendance: 31,072; Referee: S Doyle (Wexford)

30 July 2011 Round 4	Tyrone	3–19 – 1–14	Roscommon	Croke Park, Dublin
4:00pm	S Cavanagh 2-03 (1f), M Donnelly 1-01, P Harte 0-04 (3f, 1 '45), C Cavanagh, K Coney, B McGuigan 0-02 each, P Jordan, K Hughes, C Gormley, O Mulligan, S O'Neill 0-01 each	Report	K Mannion 1-02, D Shine (2f), S Kilbride (1f) 0-04 each, D McDermott 0-02, J Rogers (1f), C Cregg 0-01 each	Attendance: 39,612; Referee: M Deegan (Laois)

=== All-Ireland series ===
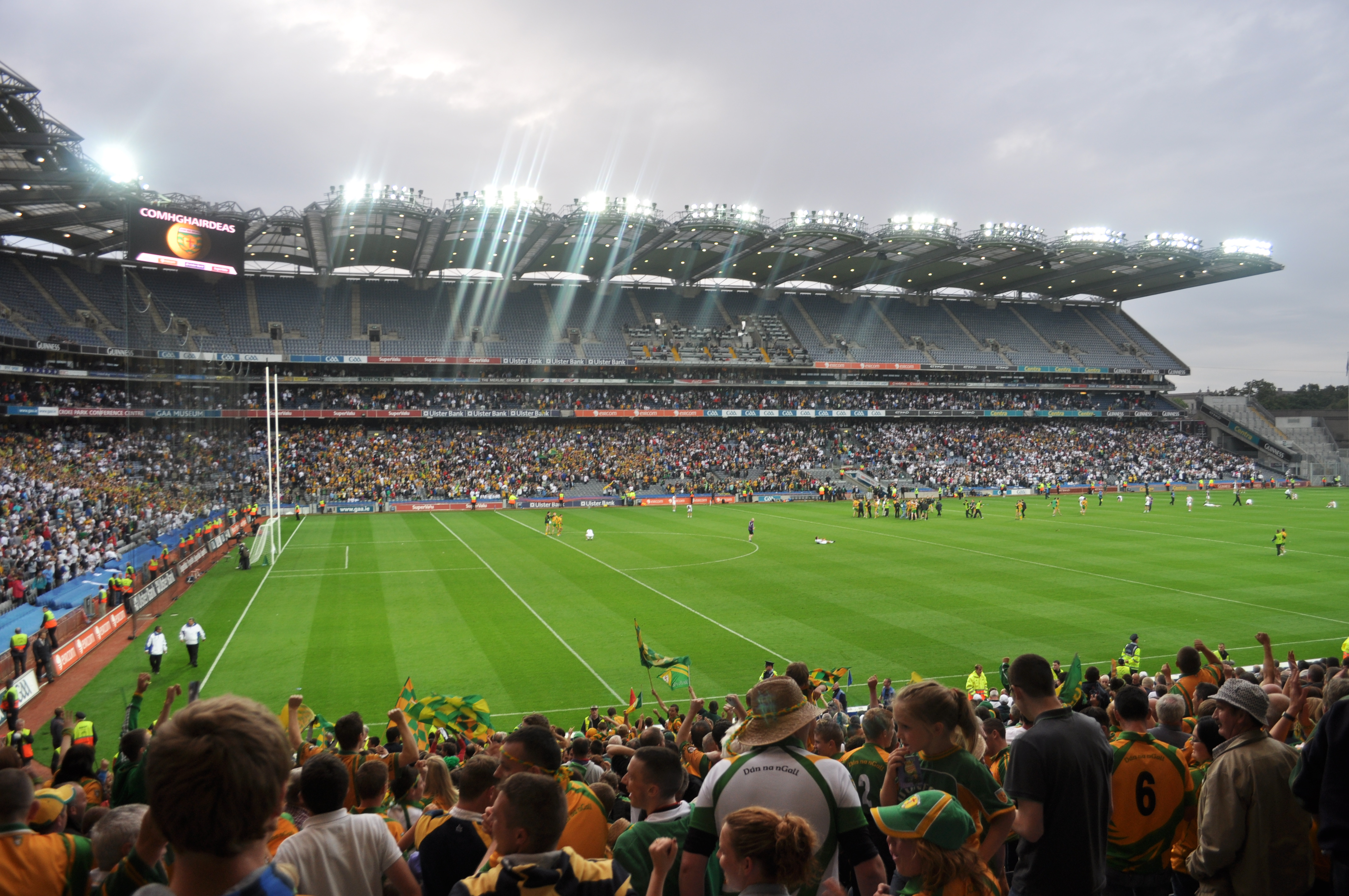
Donegal defeated Kildare in the 2011 All-Ireland Senior Football Championship in Jim McGuinness's first season in charge.

Quarter-finals
Kerry	1–20
Limerick	0–10
Mayo	1–13
Cork	2–06
Donegal	1–12
Kildare	0–14
Dublin	0–22
Tyrone	0–15

Semi-finals
Kerry	1–20
Mayo	1–11
Donegal	0–06
Dublin	0–08

Final
Kerry	1–11
Dublin	1–12

==== Quarter-finals ====
The draw for the All-Ireland quarter-finals took place on 24 July 2011, and consisted of the provincial winners playing against the winners of round 4 of the qualifiers. Originally, all the matches were due to take place on the weekend of 30 July 2011, but due to a draw requiring a replay during the qualifiers, one match was scheduled for the following weekend. All matches were scheduled to be played in Croke Park, Dublin.

31 July
2:00pm
Quarter-final

Kerry	1–20 – 0–10	Limerick
Darran O'Sullivan 1–3, Bryan Sheehan 0–6 (4f, 1 '45), C Cooper 0–3 (2f), T O Se, Declan O'Sullivan 0–2 each, K Young, A Maher, K Donaghy, J O'Donoghue 0–1 each	Report	S Kelly 0–4, I Ryan 0–2 (2f), J Riordan, G Collins, S O'Carroll, B Scanlon ('45) 0–1 each

Croke Park, Dublin
Attendance: 22,732
Referee: P McEnaney (Monaghan)

31 July
4:00pm
Quarter-final

Mayo	1–13 – 2–06	Cork
K McLoughlin 1–1, C O'Connor 0–6 (5f), E Varley (1f), K Higgins, A Dillon, A Moran, J Doherty, R Hennelly (1'45) 0–1 each	Report	D O'Connor 1–2 (1–0 pen, 0–1 '45), P Kerrigan 1–2, J Miskella, F Goold (1f) 0–1 each

Croke Park, Dublin
Attendance: 22,732
Referee: R Hickey (Clare)

30 July
6:00pm
Quarter-final

Donegal	1–12 – 0–14 A.E.T.	Kildare
C Toye 1–1, M Murphy 0–3 (1f), K Cassidy 0–2, K Lacey, R Kavanagh, M McHugh, R Bradley, P McBrearty, D Molloy 0–1 each	Report	E O'Flaherty 0–6 (4f), A Smith 0–2, E Bolton, P O'Neill, E Callaghan, J Kavanagh, G White (f), R Sweeney 0–1 each

Croke Park, Dublin
Attendance: 39,612
Referee: D Coldrick (Meath)

6 August 2011
7:00pm
Quarter-final

Dublin	0–22 – 0–15	Tyrone
D Connolly 0–7, B Brogan 0–5 (1f), A Brogan 0–3, P Flynn, S Cluxton (1f, 1 '45) 0–2 each, D Bastick, B Cullen, B Cahill 0–1 each	Report	S Cavanagh (3f), M Penrose (3f) 0–4 each, M Donnelly, Stephen O'Neill 0–2 each, B Dooher, E McGinley, P Harte (1f) 0–1 each

Croke Park, Dublin
Attendance: 52,661
Referee: J Mc Quillan (Cavan)

==== Semi-finals ====
21 August 2011
3:30pm
Semi-final

Mayo	1–11 – 1–20	Kerry
C O'Connor 1–3 (0-3f), D Vaughan 0–3, E Varley (1f), A Moran 0–2 each, L Keegan 0–1.	Report	C Cooper 1–7 (0-4f), B Sheehan 0–3 (3f), K O'Leary, K Donaghy, P Galvin 0–2 each, T O Se, Darran O'Sullivan, E Brosnan, S Scanlon 0–1 each

Croke Park, Dublin
Attendance: 50,643
Referee: D Coldrick (Meath)

28 August 2011
3:30pm
Semi-final

Dublin	0–08 – 0–06	Donegal
B Brogan 0-04 (4f), S Cluxton 0-02 (1f, 1 '45), B Cullen, K McManamon 0-01 each	Report	C McFadden 0–4 (2f), K Cassidy, R Bradley 0-01 each

Croke Park, Dublin
Attendance: 81,436
Referee: M Deegan (Laois)

==== Final ====
18 September 2011
3:30pm
Final

Kerry	1–11 – 1–12	Dublin
C Cooper 1-03 (2f), B Sheehan 0-04 (2f, 1 ‘45), K Donaghy 0-02, Declan O’Sullivan, P Galvin 0-01 each	Report	B Brogan 0-06 (4f), K McManaman 1-00, S Cluxton (2f), A Brogan 0-02 each, K Nolan, D Bastick 0-01 each

Croke Park, Dublin
Attendance: 82,300
Referee: Joe McQuillan (Cavan)

== Statistics ==
=== Scoring ===
- First goal of the championship: Kevin Higgins for Roscommon against New York (Connacht Quarter-final)
- Last goal of the championship: Kevin McManamon for Dublin against Kerry (All-Ireland Final)
- Widest winning margin: 18 points
  - Cork 5–17 – 2–8 Waterford (Munster Semi-final)
- Most goals in a match: 7
  - Cork 5–17 – 2–8 Waterford (Munster semi-final)
  - Meath 5–8 – 2–8 Louth (Qualifier round 1)
- Most points in a match: 39
  - Wexford 1–24 – 0–15 Westmeath (Leinster quarter-final)
- Most goals by one team in a match: 5
  - Cork 5–17 – 2–8 Waterford (Munster semi-final)
  - Meath 5–8 – 2–8 Louth (Qualifier round 1)
- Highest aggregate score: 47 points
  - Kerry 1–26 – 3–9 Limerick (Munster semi-final)
- Lowest aggregate score: 14 points
  - Dublin 0–8 – 0–6 Donegal (All-Ireland semi-final)
- Most goals scored by a losing team: 3
  - Limerick 3–9 – 1–26 Kerry (Munster semi-final)
- Most points scored by a losing team: 17
  - Wexford 1–17 – 1–18 Limerick (Qualifier round 4)

=== Top scorers ===
Season

	Name	Team	Tally	Total	Games	Average
1	Colm Cooper	Kerry	2–27	33	6	5.5
2	Ben Brosnan	Wexford	0–32	32	5	6.4
3	Bernard Brogan	Dublin	0–29	29	6	4.8
4	John Doyle	Kildare	2–21	27	7	3.8
5	Donncha O'Connor	Cork	4–14	26	5	5.2
6	Ciarán Lyng	Wexford	1–21	24	5	4.8
6	Cian Ward	Meath	4–12	24	4	6
8	Cillian O'Connor	Mayo	1–19	22	5	4.4
8	Daniel Goulding	Cork	2–16	22	4	5.5
8	Martin Clarke	Down	2–16	22	5	4.4
8	Donie Shine	Roscommon	1–19	22	4	5.5
8	Seán Cavanagh	Tyrone	2–16	22	6	3.66

Single game

	Name	Tally	Total	County		Opposition
1	Cian Ward	4–3	15	Meath	v	Louth
2	Darren Clarke	1–8	11	Louth	v	Meath
3	Colm Cooper	1-07	10	Kerry	v	Mayo
3	Ciarán Lyng	0–10	10	Wexford	v	Westmeath
3	Ian Ryan	1–7	10	Limerick	v	Offaly
3	Donncha O'Connor	1–7	10	Cork	v	Down
3	Shane Roche	2–4	10	Wexford	v	Carlow
3	Seánie Furlong	2–4	10	Wicklow	v	Armagh
9	Sean McCormack	0–9	9	Longford	v	Cavan
9	Adrian Marren	0–9	9	Sligo	v	Wicklow
9	Ciarán Lyng	0–9	9	Wexford	v	Offaly

=== Miscellaneous ===
- Donegal won a first Ulster title since 1992.
- Waterford won a first-ever qualifier match, beating London.
- First year since introduction of the Back door in 2001 that all Provincial champions reached the All Ireland semi-finals.

== Awards ==
Monthly

Month	Player	County
May	Ben Brosnan	Wexford
June	Alan Brogan	Dublin
July	Karl Lacey	Donegal
August	Colm Cooper	Kerry
September	Darran O'Sullivan	Kerry

All Stars Awards

The 2011 All Stars Awards nominations were announced on 3 October 2011. On 21 October, the winners of the awards were announced at an event at the National Convention Centre in Dublin. Alan Brogan was named All Stars Footballer of the Year and Cillian O'Connor was named All Stars Young Footballer of the Year.

Position	Winners	Other Nominees	
Goalkeepers	Stephen Cluxton (Dublin)	Brendan Kealy (Kerry)	Paul Durcan (Donegal)
Full-backs	Michael Foley (Kildare)	Cian O'Sullivan (Dublin)	Frank McGlynn (Donegal)
Full-backs	Marc Ó Sé (Kerry)	Rory O'Carroll (Dublin)	Tom O'Sullivan (Kerry)
Full-backs	Neil McGee (Donegal)	Joe McMahon (Tyrone)	Hugh McGrillen (Kildare)
Half-backs	Karl Lacey (Donegal)	Donal Vaughan (Mayo)	Trevor Mortimer (Mayo)
Half-backs	Kevin Nolan (Dublin)	Emmet Bolton (Kildare)	Tomás Ó Sé (Kerry)
Half-backs	Kevin Cassidy (Donegal)	Killian Young (Kerry)	Ger Brennan (Dublin)
Midfielders	Bryan Sheehan (Kerry)	Alan O'Connor (Cork)	Seán Cavanagh (Tyrone)
Midfielders	Michael Darragh Macauley (Dublin)	John Doyle (Kildare)	Denis Bastick (Dublin)
Half-forwards	Alan Brogan (Dublin)	Ben Brosnan (Wexford)	Declan O'Sullivan (Kerry)
Half-forwards	Darran O'Sullivan (Kerry)	Alan Dillon (Mayo)	Kevin McManamon (Dublin)
Half-forwards	Paul Flynn (Dublin)	Paddy Kelly (Cork)	Eamonn Callaghan (Kildare)
Full-forwards	Bernard Brogan (Dublin)	Donnacha O'Connor (Cork)	Michael Murphy (Donegal)
Full-forwards	Colm Cooper (Kerry)	Colm McFadden (Donegal)	Eoin Bradley (Derry)
Full-forwards	Andy Moran (Mayo)	Diarmuid Connolly (Dublin)	Cillian O'Connor (Mayo)

== Media ==
=== International television rights ===
Country/Countries or Continent	Broadcaster(s)
Africa	Setanta Africa
Australia	Setanta Sports
Ireland	RTÉ (including island of Ireland only web coverage on RTÉ website); Setanta Sports 1 (Northern Ireland only, for matches broadcast to the Republic by TV3); TV3 (Republic of Ireland only, including Republic of Ireland only web coverage on TV3 website); BBC Northern Ireland
Great Britain	Premier Sports
USA/Caribbean	Premium Sports

- PPV web coverage also available on Setanta-i website.

=== This Is Our Year ===
This Is Our Year is a 2011 book by journalist Declan Bogue. The book examines the 2011 All-Ireland Senior Football Championship from the perspectives of ten Gaelic footballers from Ulster. The book achieved notoriety after Donegal footballer Kevin Cassidy was dropped from the team squad by manager Jim McGuinness over his contributions. He released a statement in November 2011 saying it "appears my inter-county career is over".

== See also ==
- 2011 All-Ireland Minor Football Championship
- 2011 All-Ireland Senior Hurling Championship
