= Aidan O'Shea =

Aidan O'Shea may refer to:

- Aidan O'Shea (Kerry Gaelic footballer), son of Jack O'Shea
- Aidan O'Shea (Mayo Gaelic footballer)

== See also ==
- Jay Bradley (born 1980), American professional wrestler also known as Aiden O'Shea
