= 2004 International Rules Series =

- Event: International Rules Series
Ireland	Australia
132	82
- 132-82 on aggregate, Ireland win series 2-0

First test
Ireland	Australia
77	41
- Date: 17 October 2004
- Venue: Croke Park, Dublin, County Dublin
- Referee: Michael Collins (Ire); Stephen McBurney (Aus)
- Attendance: 46,370

Second test
Australia	Ireland
41	55
- Date: 24 October 2004
- Venue: Croke Park, Dublin, County Dublin
- Referee: Michael Collins (Ire); Stephen McBurney (Aus)
- Attendance: 60,235

The 2004 International Rules Series was the 11th annual International Rules Series and the seventh time a test series of International rules football has been played between Ireland and Australia since the series resumed in 1998.

The series was won by Ireland, who won both test matches by comfortable margins and recorded their sixth overall series victory. The series was the first to be played under the new trophy name of the Cormac McAnallen Cup, after the Tyrone team captain, whose death that year from a heart condition came after he had represented Ireland in the previous three series.

== Series overview ==
Garry Lyon returned for his fourth and final series as coach of the Australian side, whilst Pete McGrath replaced John O'Keefe as manager of Ireland. The Australian selection panel was forced into many last minute team changes, with 17 of the original 24 selected players drawn largely from the All-Australian team forced to withdraw due to injury or fatigue. Regardless, it remained a robust line-up, with 18 of the 26-man squad finishing in the top six of their club's best-and-fairest count that year. Australia warmed up for the series with an impressive 14-point win over a Dublin club side, winning 55-41.

The first test match at Croke Park was dominated by Ireland, with a hat-trick of overs from Dessie Dolan and some brilliant combination play between Stephen McDonnell and Benny Coulter resulting in a goal to the latter helping Ireland take a 28-5 lead at quarter time, the Australians lacking the familiar physical touch they had come to be renowned for. Trailing 36-10 mid-way through the second quarter, the Australian cause was left in dire straits when Mattie Forde cut through the middle like a knife through butter before skillfully slipping the ball along the ground past the diving Mal Michael in the Australia goal. Ireland led 43-13 at half time. After halftime, a more competitive Australian side emerged from the tunnel, and two early overs from Nathan Brown and Nick Riewoldt narrowed the margin slightly. Ireland responded with overs of their own from Pádraic Joyce and Dolan again, yet the decisive moment came with a goal to Joyce which left the visitors trailing 57-31, only moments after a Nathan Brown Australian goal appeared to get the visitors back in the contest. Although the likes of James Hird and Jason Johnson tried hard for Australia in the midfield and managed some consolation overs, it was the Irish players who ran out the game better, overs going to Seán Cavanagh and Tadhg Kennelly to conclude at 77-41 in Ireland's favour.

The second test was a far more competitive affair, a brilliant lightning quick first quarter being punctuated with a pre-game brawl and a canine intrusion on the pitch, much to the comic relief of the spectators. Journalists noted how the Australian physicality returned with more vigorous tackling for much of the game and appeared to pay dividends. Despite captain Hird and Ireland's Joe Bergin being sent off as part of the pre-match/early-match fighting, the Australians skipped away to 9-0 lead mid-way through the quarter thanks to some sharp shooting from forward targets Brown and Riewoldt. Ireland though absorbed the Australian pressure and eventually got their running game going, and a frenetic opening quarter finished with some classy scores to Cavanagh and Kennelly. Locked at 12-12 with three quarters to play, the Australians upped the ante in the second quarter, Brown not missing an opportunity up forward and Luke Ball being very unlucky not to score a major six-pointer to stretch the Aussie lead. At halftime it was the Australians leading 26-23. The third quarter proved to be the Achilles heel for Australia, early third quarter overs to Joyce and Coulter giving the homesters the lead for the first time in the match. Austinn Jones and Dolan traded overs, yet a crucial goal mid-way through the quarter by arguably Ireland's best player - Padraig Joyce - gave Ireland an insurmountable 44-35 lead with one quarter to play. Brown continued playing out of his skin in the fourth quarter, notching his seventh over at the halfway mark and being cruelly denied a goal by a decisive Irish block in the dying moments, yet he was the only bright spot in a disappointing tour for Australia. For Ireland, the likes of Alan Brogan and Eoin Brosnan scored overs to push out the lead into double figures and the final two minutes were played out with little resistance from the visitors, leaving captain Joyce to lift the Cormac McAnallen Cup with a 55-41 test match win, an aggregate score of 132-82. Stephen Cluxton's solid performance in goal earned him the medal for Irish player of the series, whilst the majestic Nathan Brown of Australia deservedly won the Jim Stynes Medal.

== Squads ==
Source: 2011 International Rules Series AFL Record, p 43 & Footy Stats

Ireland
Pádraic Joyce (C), Joe Bergin, Alan Brogan, Graham Canty, Seán Cavanagh,
Stephen Cluxton (GK), Brendan Coulter, Brian Cullen, Dessie Dolan, Mattie Forde,
Paul Galvin, David Heaney, Tom Kelly, Tadhg Kennelly, Seán Mary Lockhart,
Ciaran McDonald, Steven McDonnell, Martin McGrath, Brian McGuigan, Declan Browne
Ciaran McManus, James Nallen, Seán Óg O'hAilpin, Setanta O'hAilpin, Eoin Brosnan

Australia
James Hird (C), Luke Ball, Craig Bolton, Jude Bolton, Joel Bowden,
Nathan Brown, Cameron Bruce, Joel Corey, Jared Crouch, Nick Dal Santo,
Alan Didak, Andrew Embley, Brad Green, Robert Hadrill, Max Hudghton,
Austinn Jones, Jason Johnson, Brett Kirk, Adam McPhee, Mark McVeigh,
Mal Michael (GK), Brady Rawlings, Nick Riewoldt, Dean Solomon, Michael Braun

== Match results ==
=== First test (17 October) ===
Team	1	2	3	4	Total
(Republic of Ireland) Ireland	1.7.1 (28)	2.9.4 (43)	3.11.6 (57)	3.17.8	(77)
Australia	0.1.2 (5)	0.3.4 (13)	1.6.7 (31)	1.9.8	(41)
Ireland win by 36 points

Date	Sunday, 17 October 2004
Scoring (IRL)	Goals: McDonnell, Forde, Joyce Overs: Dolan 4, Bergin 2, S. Cavanagh 2, Coulter 2, Kennelly 2, McDonnell 2, Forde, Joyce, T. Kelly, A. Brogan
Scoring (AUS)	Goals: Brown Overs: Brown 3, Hird 2, Bowden, Johnson, Ball, McPhee
Best	IRL: McDonald, Coulter, Dolan, Joyce; AUS: Ball, Rawlings, Hird, Brown
Injuries	IRL: Nil; AUS: Nil
Venue	Croke Park, Dublin, County Dublin
Attendance	46,370
Umpires	Michael Collins (Ire); Stephen McBurney (Aus)

=== Second test (24 October) ===
Team	1	2	3	4	Total
(Republic of Ireland) Ireland	0.3.3 (12)	0.6.5 (23)	1.11.5 (44)	1.13.10	(55)
Australia	0.4.0 (12)	0.8.2 (26)	0.11.2 (35)	0.13.2	(41)
Ireland win by 14 points (50 points on aggregate)

Date	Sunday, 24 October 2004
Scoring (IRL)	Goals: Joyce Overs: Kennelly 3, Joyce 2, Cavanagh 2, Brogan 2, Galvin, Coulter, Dolan, Forde
Scoring (AUS)	Goals: Nil Overs: Brown 7, Riewoldt 2, Jones 2, Ball, J. Bolton
Best	IRL: Joyce, Kennelly, Cluxton, Coulter, Dolan; AUS: Brown, Riewoldt, Ball, Jones, Solomon
Injuries	IRL: Nil; AUS: Nil
Venue	Croke Park, Dublin, County Dublin
Attendance	60,515
Umpires	Michael Collins (Ire); Stephen McBurney (Aus)

== See also ==
- International rules football
- Gaelic football
- Australian rules football
- Comparison of Australian rules football and Gaelic football
