= Alan O'Connor =

Alan O'Connor may refer to:

- Alan O'Connor (Gaelic footballer)
- Alan O'Connor (rugby union)
