= Daniel Bohane =

Irish Gaelic footballer

Personal information
- Native name: Dónall Ó Buacháin (Irish)
- Nickname: Bó
- Born: 1983 (age 42–43) Tralee, County Kerry, Ireland
- Occupation: Financial Advisor
- Height: 6 ft 0 in (183 cm)

Sport
- Sport: Gaelic football
- Position: Half back, Full back
Club
- Years: Club
- 2001 - present: Austin Stacks
Inter-county
Years	County	Apps (scores)
2006 - 2013	Kerry	36(0-3)
Inter-county titles
- Munster titles: 5
- All-Irelands: 3
- All Stars: 0

Daniel Bohan is an Irish Gaelic footballer. A financial advisor by profession, he plays with the Austin Stacks club of Tralee and is a member of the Kerry county squad. He is a versatile player who can provide cover for a number of positions. For his club he usually plays Full back or Right corner back, a position he has excelled in for the Kerry Panel as well.

== 2008, his Kerry début ==
He played his first League Game for Kerry as Full back on Saturday, 31 March, 2007 when they played Tyrone and got a draw (Kerry 0-9 Tyrone 0-9). As a member of the 2007 championship panel he won an All Ireland medal that year without actually playing a game. He played his first championship game in 2008 against Clare when he came on as a substitute for Tommy Griffin after 63 minutes in the Right wing back position. Bohane made a name for himself when Kerry beat Galway in the All Ireland quarter-final, performing well when he came on as a substitute for Séamus Scanlon and looking good at midfield. During the semi-final versus Cork he did not play in the first game but he came on as a substitute 2 minutes into injury time for Tommy Walsh as a Right wing forward during the replay. In 2008 he played in 3 championship games as a substitute, was selected in the first 15 for 2 out of 7 games (substituted in both) and came on as substitute in 4 games. He scored 1 point in the 2008 League.

== 2009 ==
In the 2009 National League campaign Bohan became a regular for the Kerry Panel. Aidan O'Shea started as Right wing back at Kerry's game versus Donegal until he was replaced by Daniel Bohan. During Kerry's second game in the League versus Tyrone he started as Right wing back and also played in the third game versus Derry in the same position but in the Mayo game Tommy Griffin started in this position and Bohan came on as a substitute after 52 minutes. Bohan injured himself during training and did not play in Kerry's remaining games versus Westmeath, Dublin, Galway and the final versus Derry. Bohan did not play in Kerry's first two games in the 2009 Championship versus Cork due to injuries and also would not start in Kerry's first qualifier game versus Longford.
