= Kevin Nolan (Gaelic footballer) =

Dublin Gaelic footballer

Personal information
- Native name: Caoimhín Ó Nualláin (Irish)
- Born: Sept 1988 Dublin, Ireland
- Occupation: Teacher of PE

Sport
- Sport: Gaelic football
- Position: Left half-back
Clubs
- Years: Club
- 2006–2018 2018? 2019? onwards: Kilmacud Crokes; Cremartin
Club titles
- Dublin titles: 2
- Leinster titles: 2
- All-Ireland Titles: 1
College(s)
- Years: College
- DCU; UUJ
College titles
- Sigerson titles: 1
Inter-county
Years	County	Apps (scores)
2008–2015	Dublin	22 (0–5)
Inter-county titles
- Leinster titles: 6
- All-Irelands: 2
- NFL: 2
- All Stars: 1

Kevin Nolan (born 19 September 1988) is a Gaelic footballer who formerly played for Kilmacud Crokes and the Dublin county team.

On the field of play, Nolan won a Sigerson Cup with DCU; an All-Ireland Senior Club Football Championship with Kilmacud Crokes; a National Football League and All-Ireland Senior Football Championship with Dublin, winning the man of the match award for his performance in the final of the latter.

== Early life ==
Nolan was raised in Monkstown, Dublin. He attended Holly Park for his education. He played association football with St Joseph's Boys in Sallynoggin. English association football clubs Leicester City and Blackburn Rovers expressed an interest and invited him to go to England for trials. He left that sport due to making progress with the Dublin minor football team.

== Playing career ==
=== Club ===
Nolan won the 2008 Dublin Senior Football Championship with Kilmacud Crokes. He then won a Leinster Senior Club Football Championship, Dublin Division One AFL and the All-Ireland Senior Club Football Championship.

He played his last game with Crokes in 2018, when he moved to County Monaghan and began playing for Cremartin.

== College ==
Nolan won a Sigerson Cup with DCU.

=== Inter-county ===
Nolan won the Dublin Minor Football Championship.

He made his championship debut for Dublin against Wexford in the final of the 2008 Leinster Senior Football Championship.

He won five further Leinster Senior Football Championships with Dublin: in 2009, 2011, 2012, 2013 and 2014.

Nolan was named the man of the match in the 2011 All-Ireland Senior Football Championship Final, as Dublin won their first title in sixteen years. He was part of the half-back line with James McCarthy and Ger Brennan, and also scored during the final.

However, injury and a medical condition limited his further development as a player.

Jim Gavin called time on Nolan's inter-county career by omitting him from the Dublin panel before the start of the 2015 Championship.

== International rules ==
Nolan won the U-17 International Rules Series with Ireland.

== Move away ==
Nolan later moved from his base in Lucan to County Monaghan (close to Castleblayney) and married Lorna (to whom he became engaged in 2017) in April 2019. He previously suggested an openness to playing for the Monaghan county football team. This never came to be.

Awards
Preceded by Daniel Goulding (Cork)	All-Ireland SFC final Man of the Match; 2011	Succeeded by Michael Murphy (Donegal)
