= Ciarán Lyng =

Irish sportsman (born 1986)

Ciarán Lyng (born 9 July 1986) is an All Star-nominated Irish sportsperson. He plays Gaelic football and hurling for St Martin's and Gaelic football for the Wexford senior inter-county team, and has played international rules football for Ireland. He has also played association football in the English Football League and at under-age level for Ireland.

== Early and personal life ==
Lyng grew up as one of four brothers in Wexford, playing football, hurling, handball and soccer. His brother Diarmuid Lyng plays hurling for Wexford.

== Soccer career ==
Lyng played soccer almost thirty times for Ireland at underage level. He had a number of offers from British clubs such as Premier League Arsenal and Derby County but opted to move to Preston North End. Lyng moved to Shrewsbury Town in December 2004. He made four substitute appearances in the latter half of the 2004–05 season. In the 2005–06 season for Shrewsbury, he made one start, in a Football League Trophy match which Shrewsbury lost to Cheltenham Town.

== Football career ==
Lyng has since been selected for the Wexford Gaelic football team in the All-Ireland Senior Football Championship. He was a member of the Wexford panel which reached the 2008 Leinster Senior Football Championship final. Lyng scored four points against Meath in the quarter-final and one point against Laois in the semi-final. However, Wexford were easily defeated by Dublin in the Leinster Senior Football Championship Final. Wexford went on to surprisingly reach the All-Ireland Senior Football Championship semi-final, where they were comfortably beaten by Tyrone. 2008 was a year to remember for Lyng: he was nominated for an All-Star and he then represented Ireland against Australia in the International Rules Series that October. A first county medal topped off a great year for Lyng when his St. Martin's team comfortably beat Oulart the Ballagh in a huge upset in the Wexford Senior County Hurling Final.

Ciarán won his first County Medal with St Martin's in Intermediate Football in 2007, gaining the 'Man of the Match' award. His brother Diarmuid Lyng captained that side. He subsequently won a senior county football title with his club in 2013 and he has won two senior county hurling titles with St Martin's in 2017 and 2019.
