= Colm Cavanagh =

Tyrone Gaelic footballer

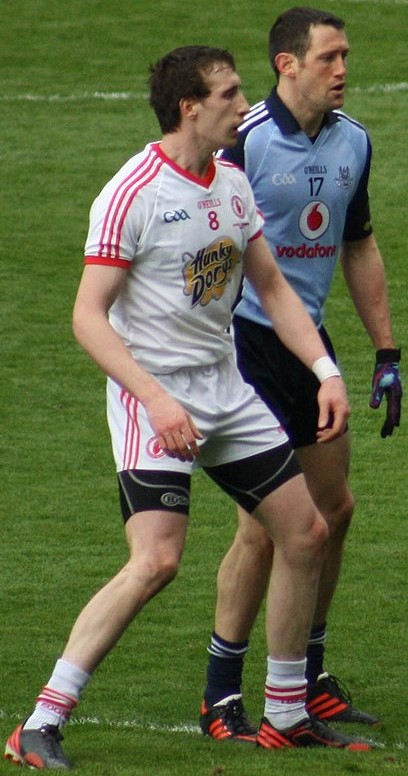
- Cavanagh (left) with Dublin player Denis Bastick during the 2013 National Football League final at Croke Park

Personal information
- Native name: Colm Caomhánach (Irish)
- Nickname: Collie
- Born: County Tyrone
- Occupation: Accountant
- Height: 6 ft 4 in (193 cm)

Sport
- Sport: Gaelic football
- Position: Lár Na pairce
Club
- Years: Club
- Moy
Club titles
- Ulster titles: Ulster
Inter-county
- Years: County
- 2007–2020: Tyrone
Inter-county titles
- Ulster titles: 3
- All-Irelands: 1
- All Stars: 2

Colm Cavanagh is a Gaelic footballer from the Moy club and, previously, for the Tyrone county team. His older brother Seán also played for Tyrone.

== Playing career ==
Cavanagh played for the University of Ulster team, and in 2007, reached the Sigerson Cup Final. He was part of the Tyrone Under-21 team won the Ulster Championship in 2006.

His Tyrone Senior career was shrouded in controversy from the beginning. He made his debut for Tyrone in the 2007 Dr McKenna Cup; however, he had also been selected by his university team for the competition. The competition rules state that in such an event, the university should get first choice of the player, in order to even up the competition. Tyrone manager Mickey Harte refused to obey this rule, contending that it should be up to the players to decide whom they wish to play for. Four Tyrone players were caught up in the dispute: Cavanagh, Brendan Boggs, Damien McCaul (who all play for the University of Ulster) and St Mary's University, Belfast player Cathal McCarron. Tyrone were docked points for the match the players participated in, but still progressed to win the competition.

He was consistently on the starting line-up for Tyrone in their 2007 National League campaign.

In his Ulster Championship debut, on 20 May 2007, against Fermanagh, Cavanagh was having a solid game until an accidental collision left him badly injured. The game was delayed for over seven minutes while he was receiving treatment, and was taken to hospital as a precaution. Initial fears about a serious neck injury were allayed as he was discharged from hospital soon after the end of the match. The injury ruled him out of Tyrone's next fixture against Donegal.

Cavanagh announced his retirement from inter-county football in September 2020 ahead of the delayed resumption of the season caused by the impact of the COVID-19 pandemic on Gaelic games.

== Honours ==
Moy

- Tyrone Intermediate Football Championship (1): 2017
- Ulster Intermediate Club Football Championship (1): 2017
- All-Ireland Intermediate Club Football Championship (1): 2018

Tyrone

- Ulster Minor Football Championship (2): 2003 2004
- All-Ireland Minor Football Championship (1): 2004
- Ulster Under-21 Football Championship (1): 2006
- Ulster Senior Football Championship (5): 2007, 2009, 2010, 2016, 2017
- All-Ireland Senior Football Championship (1): 2008
- Dr McKenna Cup (1): 2012
- All Star Award (2): 2017 2018
