= Tomás Mac an tSaoir =

Irish Gaelic footballer

Personal information
- Native name: Tomás Mac an tSaoir (Irish)
- Born: 1990 (age 35–36) County Kerry
- Occupation: teacher
- Height: 5 ft 11 in (180 cm)

Sport
- Sport: Gaelic football
- Position: Keeper
Clubs
- Years: Club
- An Ghaeltacht and An Rinn
Club titles
- Kerry titles: 1 Intermediate
- Munster titles: 1 Intermediate
Inter-county
Years	County	Apps (scores)
2008-2010 2011-	Kerry U21; Kerry	9 (0-0)
Inter-county titles
- Munster titles: 2 . (1 Under -21, 1 Junior)
- All-Irelands: 2 (1 under 21, 1 Junior)
- NFL: 0
- All Stars: 0

Tomás Mac an tSaoir (born 1990 in County Kerry) is an Irish sportsperson. He plays Gaelic football with An Rinn having transferred from his local club An Ghaeltacht in 2022 and is a former member of the senior Kerry county football team. He made his Kerry under-21 debut on 15 March 2008 against Limerick. That year the Kerry U21s won the All-Ireland Under 21 Football Championship. In March 2010, he was nominated captain of the Kerry under-21 team. As of 2017, he was playing as goalkeeper for the Kerry junior county team.

In 2021, he joined newly appointed Waterford football manager Shane Ronayne's backroom team as goalkeeping coach.

In October 2024, he was named as the new manager of the Waterford Senior Ladies Football team, taking over from Pat Sullivan after his move to Kildare.
