= John Devine (Gaelic footballer) =

Irish Gaelic footballer

Personal information
- Native name: Seán Ó Daimhín (Irish)
- Born: 13 June 1983 (age 43) County Tyrone
- Occupation: Teacher
- Height: 1.91 m (6 ft 3 in)

Sport
- Sport: Gaelic football
- Position: Goalkeeper
Club
- Years: Club
- Errigal Ciarán
Inter-county
- Years: County
- 2002-2013: Tyrone
Inter-county titles
- Ulster titles: 4
- All-Irelands: 3
- NFL: 2
- All Stars: 0

John Devine is a Gaelic football goalkeeper for the Errigal Ciarán club and the Tyrone county team. For his county, Devine was in competition for the position with Pascal McConnell, Johnny Curran and Niall Morgan, but all three players maintained a good relationship, with McConnell being his rival for the best part of 10 years.

As of 2021, Devine is still playing Club Football for Errigal Ciarán at the age of 38.

== Playing career ==
=== Club ===
Devine represents the Errigal Ciarán club. He holds three county titles with the club, and one Ulster club title in 2002.

=== Inter-county ===
After winning the 2001 All-Ireland Minor Football Championship with Tyrone, Devine made his debut for the senior team at the age of 19 in 2002 against Leitrim. He was the goalkeeper for Tyrone in their first All-Ireland-winning year, but was the substitute goalie when Tyrone repeated the feat in 2005.

He was due to start the 2008 All-Ireland Senior Football Championship Final on 21 September; however the night before the game his father died. The Tyrone team went on to win their third All-Ireland of the decade, and dedicated the win to their absent goalkeeper, having worn black armbands throughout the match.

After two shoulder re-construction surgeries, he went on to captain the Tyrone senior team to McKenna cup victory in 2012. Devine announced his retirement from inter-county football in March 2013 to concentrate on his career with Errigal Ciarán.
