= Eamonn Fennell =

Irish Gaelic footballer

Éamonn Fennell
Personal information
- Native name: Éamonn Ó Fionnail (Irish)
- Born: 1984 (age 41–42) Dublin, Ireland
- Height: 1.95 m (6 ft 5 in)

Sport
- Sport: Gaelic Football
- Position: Midfield
Clubs
- Years: Club
- 2001-2010 2011-: O'Tooles; St Vincents
Club titles
- Dublin titles: 2
- Leinster titles: 2
- All-Ireland Titles: 1
Inter-county
- Years: County
- 2005-2013: Dublin
Inter-county titles
- Leinster titles: 4
- All-Irelands: 1

Eamonn Fennell (born 1984) is a Gaelic footballer who plays for the St Vincents club and, formerly, for northside club O'Tooles. He has played for the Dublin county team in the past.

== Inter-county ==
Fennell was first brought onto the Dublin team in 2005, after winning Leinster with the Dublin U21s. Fennell was on Dublin's 2008 O'Byrne Cup winning team, which defeated Longford in the final. He helped guide Dublin to promotion to Division One of the National Football League. Fennell has won the Leinster Senior Football Championship with Dublin in 2008, 2009 and 2011. He came on as a substitute in Dublins All-Ireland victory over rivals Kerry at Croke Park in September 2011.

== Transfer issue ==
Fennell was the subject of a controversial club transfer move from his club O'Tooles to northside rivals St Vincents. The transfer was rejected by his own club and then by the Dublin county board with Dublin's Cork born county chairman Gerry Harrington giving the deciding vote. The verdict is expected to be appealed. The reason given for the rejection was "A player is considered to always owe allegiance and loyalty to the club he first legally participated with in club competition." The transfer to St Vincents was finally agreed on 15 February 2011.

== Imposter ==
After the 2011 All-Ireland Senior Football Championship Final, a Dublin fan sneaked onto the pitch to celebrate. He put on Fennell's discarded tracksuit top after joining the substitutes' bench and was seen on live television and in photographs.
