= Stephen O'Neill =

Tyrone Gaelic footballer

Stephen O'Néill
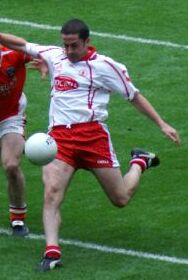
- O'Neill during the 2005 All-Ireland Senior Football Championship semi-final

Personal information
- Born: 19 November 1980 (age 45) Strabane, County Tyrone, Northern Ireland
- Occupation: Primary school teacher
- Height: 6 ft 0 in (183 cm)

Sport
- Sport: Gaelic football
- Position: Full Forward
Club
- Years: Club
- 1997–: Clann na nGael
Inter-county
Years	County	Apps (scores)
1999–2014	Tyrone	30 (7–114)
Inter-county titles
- Ulster titles: 5
- All-Irelands: 3
- NFL: 2
- All Stars: 3

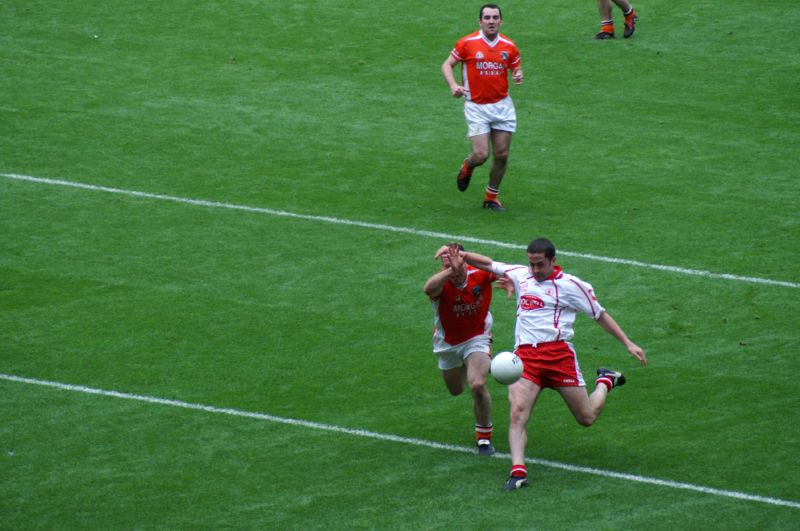
Stephen O'Neill (right) during the 2005 All-Ireland Senior Football Championship semi-final

Stephen O'Neill (born 19 November 1980) is an Irish former Gaelic footballer who played at senior level for the Tyrone county team. He won three All-Ireland Senior Football Championship medals, two Under 21 medals, and a Minor medal. O'Neill was the 2005 All Stars Footballer of the Year, and won All Stars Awards in 2001, 2005 and 2009.

His style of play was quite traditional as a full forward, often getting on the end of passes, and scoring with his preferred left foot. It's his superior physical strength that set him apart from his peers, coupled with his agility on the ball, making him very difficult to mark.

O'Neill announced his retirement from the Tyrone Gaelic football team in January 2008, but made himself available for the All-Ireland final of the same year. Tyrone won the competition, but O'Neill refused to accept the medal, citing the fact that he felt he had not earned it, having not been part of the team on their journey to the final. He is from Strabane in Northern Ireland.

== Playing career ==
=== Club ===
O'Neill's home club is Clan na Gael in Aughabrack. With the side he has won one Tyrone Junior Football Championship and one Tyrone Intermediate Football Championship.

=== Inter-county ===
==== Youth player ====
O'Neill had success with Tyrone youth teams, winning two Ulster and All-Ireland under 21 titles in 2000 and 2001 to add to his Ulster Minor championship medals in 1997 and 1998 and his All-Ireland minor championship in 1998.

==== Senior ====
O'Neill burst on to the senior county scene and by 2001 had won an Ulster title and the first of his three All Star Awards. During his time with Tyrone he was first choice penalty taker – scoring three in the run up to Tyrone's 2005 All-Ireland victory, and also shared free-taking duty with Owen Mulligan—usually dictated by who is kicking on their stronger side.

O'Neill won All-Ireland Senior Football Championship medals with Tyrone in 2003 and 2005, and the National Football League in Tyrone's break-through year of 2002, and again in 2003. Serious injury ruled him out for much of Tyrone's unsuccessful 2006 championship.

He won an All Stars Award in 2001 and 2005. In 2005, he was won a clean sweep of the Texaco award, the Gaelic player's award and the Vodafone award for Footballer of the Year, after a monumental year where he scored a total of 64 points (5–49). These performances earned him a place in the Irish team in the international rules series for 2005 against Australia.

===== Retirement and return =====
Following two years where he was blighted by recurring injuries, O'Neill agreed to undergo surgery before the end of 2007 to resolve a complex knee tendinitis condition. It was hoped that this would make him fully fit for the 2008 Championship, but he announced his retirement from inter-county football at the young age of 27.

However, on 4 September 2008, it was announced that O'Neill would be available for selection for the All-Ireland final, following the approval of the other panel players who had reached the final without his contributions. This was despite the fact that a mere two days earlier he had gone on record denying a return, suggesting that his long absence would affect his match-sharpness.

O'Neill's return to action came earlier than many expected during the 2008 All-Ireland Senior Football Championship Final, as a 25th minute sub for the injured Colm McCullagh. Although he failed to register a score he caused the Kerry defence a number of problems and helped Tyrone to their third Senior Football Championship win in six years. Despite being entitled to one, O'Neill refused to accept his winner's medal, saying that he "did not earn" it. He was visibly upset as he was climbing the steps to be presented the trophy, and had to be consoled by teammates, such as Conor Gormley.

O'Neill helped Tyrone win another Ulster Championship in 2009, beating Antrim in the final, collecting an end of season All Stars Award, his third.

O'Neill dislocated his elbow in the final of the 2010 Dr McKenna Cup, which Tyrone lost to Donegal.

.

== Post-playing career ==
O'Neill was brought in as part of the backroom team of his former Tyrone teammate Enda McGinley when McGinley took over as Antrim manager in November 2020.

In August 2023, he was announced as forwards coach and selector of the senior Cavan county team.

== Personal life ==
O'Neill is from Aughabrack, a hamlet near Dunamanagh in the Parish of Donagheady in West Tyrone, Northern Ireland,

O'Neill is a primary school principal at St Michaels's Primary School in Dunamanagh, County Tyrone.
