= Pascal McConnell =

Irish Gaelic footballer

Personal information
- Native name: Pascal Mac Dhónaill (Irish)
- Nickname: Packie
- Born: 10 April 1980 (age 46) County Tyrone
- Height: 6 ft 4 in (193 cm)

Sport
- Sport: Gaelic football
- Position: Goalkeeper
Club
- Years: Club
- 1999–: Newtownstewart St Eugene's
Inter-county
- Years: County
- 1999–2013: Tyrone
Inter-county titles
- Ulster titles: 5
- All-Irelands: 3
- NFL: 1
- All Stars: 0

Pascal McConnell (born 10 April 1980) is a former Gaelic footballer who played for the Tyrone county team.

He is an All-Ireland Senior Football Championship winner.

McConnell competed with John Devine and Niall Morgan to be first choice goalkeeper for Tyrone.

== Early life and family ==
McConnell's older brother is Tyrone's All Star-winning goalkeeper of the nineties, Finbar McConnell.

== Playing career ==
In 1998, McConnell played alongside Stephen O'Neill in the MacRory Cup semi-final for Omagh CBS.

Over the course of his career with Tyrone GAA, McConnell helped win three All-Ireland senior medals for the county.

=== Retirement ===
McConnell announced his retirement from inter-county football in November 2013.

When asked about this decision, McConnell said, "There is a big commitment required in order to stay performing at the top level and I feel the time is right to bow out and start a new chapter in my life. I have absolutely no regrets from my playing career with Tyrone, although, I suppose if I was a bit greedy, I would say that I felt that we could have won the All Ireland in 2009 and 2010."

His retirement from inter-county football left Conor Gormley, Dermot Carlin, Stephen O'Neill and Seán Cavanagh as the only remaining links to the Tyrone team that won the county's first All-Ireland senior title in 2003.
