= Michael Foley (Kildare footballer) =

Kildare Gaelic footballer

Personal information
- Native name: Micheál Ó Foghladhas (Irish)
- Born: Kildare, Ireland

Sport
- Sport: Gaelic football
- Position: Full-back
Club
- Years: Club
- Athy
Club titles
- Kildare titles: 1
Inter-county
- Years: County
- 2004–2014: Kildare
Inter-county titles
- NFL: 1
- All Stars: 1

Michael "Mick" Foley is an Irish Gaelic footballer who plays for his local club, Athy, and for the Kildare county team. He also played hurling with Kildare.

He plays full-back for the Kildare senior inter-county team since making his senior debut in 2004. In 2011, he was selected as a member of Football All-Star team.

He was captain of the Athy senior football team that won the Kildare County Championship in 2011.

== Honours ==
- Kildare Senior Football Championship (2): 2011 (c) 2020
- Leinster Under-21 Football Championship (1): 2004
- National Football League Division 2 (1): 2012
- O'Byrne Cup (2): 2011, 2013
- All-Star (1): 2011
- Kildare Senior Football League Division 2 2009
- Kildare senior football league division 1 2018
