= Kevin McManamon =

Irish Gaelic footballer

Kevin Phelim Roy McManamon
Personal information
- Native name: Caoimhín Mac Meanman (Irish)
- Born: 9 December 1986 (age 39) Dublin, Ireland
- Occupation: Sports psychologist
- Height: 1.8 m (5 ft 11 in)

Sport
- Sport: Gaelic football
- Position: Left corner forward
Club
- Years: Club
- 2004–: St Jude's
Inter-county
Years	County	Apps (scores)
2010–2021	Dublin	25 (4–21)
Inter-county titles
- Leinster titles: 10
- All-Irelands: 8
- NFL: 5

Kevin McManamon (born 9 December 1986) is a Gaelic footballer from Dublin who plays for the St Jude's club and was a senior member of the Dublin county team since 2010. He retired in December 2021.

McManamon made his senior debut in O'Byrne Cup against Wexford. In 2010 during the league he was selected as one of the top young players as well being part of the Under 21 Dublin team that won the All-Ireland Under 21 Football Championship.

In the 2011 All-Ireland Senior Football Championship, McManamon played a significant role in the semi-final and final. In the semi-final against Donegal, he came as a substitute with 20 minutes left in the match and scored a vital point.

In the final, he also came on with 20 minutes to go and scored a goal to reduce the margin between the teams at the time from 4 points to a single point. Dublin went on to win the match by a single point and the Irish Independent named him as their man of the match.

On 1 December 2021, in a statement released by Dublin GAA, McManamon announced his immediate retirement from inter-county football.

In August 2026, he was brought in to League of Ireland Premier Division club St Patrick's Athletic by manager Stephen Kenny as a Sports Performance Coach, working with the players on their mentality.

== Honours ==
Dublin

- All-Ireland Senior Football Championship (8): 2011, 2013, 2015, 2016, 2017, 2018, 2019, 2020
- Leinster Senior Football Championship (10): 2011, 2012, 2013, 2014, 2015, 2016, 2017, 2018, 2019, 2020
- National Football League (5): 2013, 2014, 2015, 2016, 2018
- O'Byrne Cup (1): 2015
