= Stephen Cluxton =

Dublin Gaelic football goalkeeper

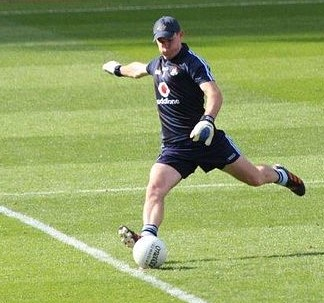
- Cluxton taking a kick-out against Mayo during the 2012 All-Ireland SFC semi-final

Personal information
- Native name: Stiofán Mac Lachtain (Irish)
- Nicknames: Clucko; Stevo
- Born: 17 December 1981 (age 44) Coolock, Dublin, Ireland
- Occupation: Secondary school teacher

Sport
- Sport: Gaelic football
- Position: Goalkeeper
Club
- Years: Club
- 2000–: Parnells
Club titles
- Dublin titles: 0
College
- Years: College
- 2002–2006: Dublin City University
College titles
- Sigerson titles: 1
Inter-county*
Years	County	Apps (scores)
2001–2020, 2023–2025	Dublin	128 (0–51)
Inter-county titles
- Leinster titles: 18
- All-Irelands: 9
- NFL: 5
- All Stars: 7
- *Inter County team apps and scores correct as of 20:30, 12 December 2025.

Stephen Cluxton (born 17 December 1981) is an Irish Gaelic footballer who plays as a goalkeeper at senior level for the Dublin county team.

Cluxton made his senior debut for Dublin during the 2001 Championship. Since then he has established himself as Dublin's first-choice goalkeeper. Along with Mick Fitzsimons and James McCarthy, Cluxton holds the record of most All-Ireland Senior Football Championship medals, with nine medals, beginning with wins in 2011 and 2013, and including six championships in a row from 2015 to 2020. Cluxton is the only player in the history of the game to captain a team to seven championship titles. He has also won a record 18 Leinster medals, five National Football League medals and six All Stars.

== Early life ==
Born in Coolock, Cluxton was raised in a house that had a strong association with association football. His father, Pat, won a lot of medals with Postal Celtic, while Cluxton himself played with St David's Primary School and Tolka Rovers.

== Playing career ==
=== College ===
Cluxton first played competitive Gaelic football with St David's CBS in Artane. He initially played association football at school and was reluctant to play Gaelic football as he believed that the sport was "too brutal". Cluxton was eventually persuaded to join the St David's Gaelic football team and began as a corner-forward because of his ability to kick the ball off the ground before later moving to corner-back. The suspension and emigration of the school's first and second-choice goalkeepers saw Cluxton fill in as goalkeeper.

=== University ===
During his studies at Dublin City University, Cluxton was selected for the college's senior Gaelic football team. On 25 February 2006, he won a Sigerson Cup medal as goalkeeper following DCU's 0–11 to 1–4 defeat of Queen's University Belfast in the final.

=== Club ===
Cluxton joined the Parnells club at a young age and played in all grades at juvenile and underage levels. Known for his shot stopping, reflexes and agility in these grades, some deemed him a "little small for a goalkeeper and questioned his aerial ability" when he eventually joined the club's senior team. Cluxton subsequently worked on these "perceived weaknesses" in his game. He plays midfield with them.

=== Inter-county ===
==== Minor and under-21 ====
Cluxton first played for Dublin at minor level as a 17-year-old. On 7 August 1999, he was in goal when Dublin defeated Wexford by 2–13 to 1–12 in the Leinster final replay.

Cluxton subsequently joined the Dublin under-21 team, making his first appearance on 18 February 2001 in a Leinster quarter-final defeat of Longford.

After a disappointing debut season in the grade, Cluxton won a Leinster Championship medal in 2002 after a 1–17 to 2–4 defeat of Wicklow in the final at St Conleth's Park. On 6 October 2002, Cluxton was in goal for Dublin when they suffered a 0–15 to 0–7 defeat by Galway in the All-Ireland final.

==== Senior ====
===== 2001–2005 =====
Cluxton made his championship debut in goal for Dublin on 27 May 2001 in a 2–19 to 1–13 Leinster Senior Football Championship (SFC) defeat of Longford. He made two appearances during the championship before being replaced by regular goalkeeper Davy Byrne, who returned from injury.

Byrne's retirement from Dublin in February 2002 allowed Cluxton to take over as first-choice goalkeeper. Cluxton made his National Football League debut against Donegal in 2002; he would go on to complete his 99th league appearance against Donegal in 2018. On 14 July 2002, he was in goal when Dublin won a first Leinster SFC title in seven years after a 2–13 to 2–11 defeat of Kildare in the final. Cluxton ended the season by winning his first All Star Award as well as being named the RTÉ/Hibernian Young Personality of the Year.

On 5 July 2003, Cluxton was red-carded for kicking Steven McDonnell in the 43rd minute of Dublin's All-Ireland SFC Qualifier defeat by Armagh. Dublin manager Tommy Lyons publicly blamed him for the defeat stating that his dismissal "turned the whole game." Reports suggested that Cluxton walked home alone from Croke Park without his gearbag as many suspected that he would receive a lengthy ban. The uncertainty led to Cluxton questioning his future involvement with the team, particularly when St Patrick's Athletic and other professional football clubs offered him a contract to switch codes and play in the League of Ireland. Ultimately, he received a one-month ban and soon returned to the Dublin panel.

On 17 July 2005, Cluxton won his second Leinster SFC medal after Dublin's 0–14 to 0–13 defeat of Laois in the final.

===== 2006–2012 =====
Cluxton won a third Leinster SFC medal on 16 July 2006, when Dublin retained the title after a 1–15 to 0–9 defeat of Offaly in the final. He ended the season by winning his second All Star Award in goal.

On 15 July 2007, Cluxton won his fourth Leinster SFC medal, when Dublin completed a hat-trick of provincial titles following a 3–14 to 1–14 defeat of Laois in the final. In spite of some questionable kick-outs in the All-Ireland SFC semi-final defeat by Kerry, Cluxton conceded just two goals in six championship games and was presented with his third All Star Award.

Cluxton won a fifth Leinster SFC medal on 20 July 2008, when Dublin retained the title for a fourth successive year after a 3–23 to 0–9 defeat of Wexford in the final.

On 12 July 2009, Cluxton was in goal for Dublin's fifth successive Leinster SFC triumph after a 2–15 to 0–18 defeat of Kildare in the final. He was later nominated for an All Star Award; however, he lost out to Kerry's Diarmuid Murphy.

A free kick to win the All-Ireland...Stephen Cluxton...in
his 55th championship match...15 points in his career
so far, he's already got one today...the distance with
the angle about 45 metres, here he comes to win the
All-Ireland...Cluxton...he's put it over the bar...and Dublin
are in front by 1–12 to 1–11...Cluxton the hero.

— RTÉ's Ger Canning describes the last moments of the
2011 All-Ireland final.

Dublin surrendered their title to Meath in 2010 in a game which saw Cluxton concede five goals; however, he won a seventh Leinster Championship medal the following year after a 2–12 to 1–12 defeat of Wexford in the final. On 18 September 2011, Cluxton lined out in goal against Kerry in his first All-Ireland SFC final. In the 72nd minute of the game, and with the sides level, he scored a free kick to secure a 1–12 to 1–11 victory and a first All-Ireland SFC title for Dublin in 16 years. Shortly after the final whistle, Cluxton was presented with the match ball by Tomás Ó Sé; however, in keeping with his intensely private persona, he avoided the post-match celebrations and retreated to the dressing room. Dublin teammate Paul Flynn paid tribute afterwards: "He [Cluxton] is out training an hour before everybody else and he kicks them over with his eyes closed. I didn't even look at the kick. I looked at him and he just kicked it and ran back. He is a phenomenal man, I am delighted for him." Cluxton ended the season by winning a fourth All Star Award, as well as being nominated for Footballer of the Year.

On 22 July 2012, Cluxton won an eighth Leinster SFC medal after a 2–13 to 1–13 defeat of Meath in the final. Dublin later surrendered their All-Ireland SFC title; however, Cluxton ended the season with another All Star nomination but lost out to Donegal's Paul Durcan for the goalkeeping position. Jim Gavin's appointment as manager of Dublin in October 2012 resulted in Cluxton taking over the captaincy of the team.

===== 2013–2020 =====
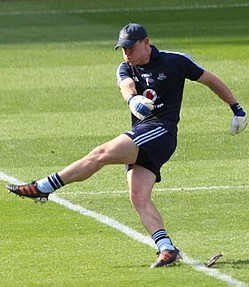
Cluxton taking a kick-out against Mayo during the 2012 All-Ireland SFC semi-final

On 28 April 2013, he won his first silverware as captain when the Dublin team defeated Tyrone by 0–18 to 0–17 to win the National Football League title for the first time in 20 years. He later won a ninth Leinster SFC medal when he captained Dublin to a 2–15 to 0–14 defeat of Meath in the final. He was later criticised on The Sunday Game for time wasting by taking 7 minutes and 54 seconds to take seven frees during the game. On 22 September 2013, Cluxton captained Dublin for the first time in an All-Ireland SFC final. He ended the game as Dublin's second top scorer with two points from frees in Dublin's 2–12 to 1–14 defeat of Mayo. Cluxton ended the year by winning a fifth All Star Award, while he was also nominated for Footballer of the Year for a second time.

On 27 April 2014, Cluxton won a second successive National League medal as captain of the team following Dublin's 3–19 to 1–10 defeat of Derry in defending their title. He later won his 10th Leinster SFC medal, as Dublin retained the title for a fourth successive year following a 3–20 to 1–10 defeat of Meath. Dublin later surrendered their All-Ireland title; however, Cluxton ended the season with another All Star nomination but lost out to Donegal's Paul Durcan for the second time in three seasons.

Cluxton captained Dublin to a third successive National League title on 26 April 2015 after a 1–12 to 2–7 defeat of Cork in the final. Later that season, Dublin's dominance continued in the Leinster SFC, with Cluxton winning an 11th provincial medal when he captained Dublin to a 2–13 to 0–06 defeat of Westmeath in the final. On 20 September 2015, he became the first goalkeeper to score in three All-Ireland finals when he captained Dublin to a 0–12 to 0–9 defeat of Kerry. It was his third All-Ireland SFC winners' medal.

Cluxton again led Dublin to an All-Ireland SFC final in 2016 against Mayo. This ended a draw after a relatively poor game due to difficult weather conditions, on a scoreline of 2–9 to 0–15. He captained Dublin to win the replay on a scoreline of 1–15 to 1–14.

In 2017, Dublin were narrowly defeated in the National League final by Kerry by a single point. Dublin, however, went on to win a record seven Leinster SFC titles in-a-row. On 17 September, Cluxton again captained Dublin to a historic 3-in-a-row All-Ireland SFC titles with another narrow 1–17 to 1–16 victory against Mayo. Having been outplayed in the first half, the Dubs turned the game around to win a thrilling game courtesy of a 75th-minute Dean Rock free.

Cluxton started in six of Dublin's games during the 2018 National League, during which time he made his 100th league appearance. On 1 April 2018, he captained Dublin to a fifth league title in seven seasons after an 0–18 to 0–14 defeat of Galway in the final. During the subsequent Leinster SFC semi-final defeat of Longford, Cluxton suffered an injury to the lower back after a challenge by James McGivney. The injury resulted in him missing his first championship game since 2004; however, he won a 14th Leinster SFC medal as a non-playing substitute after Dublin's 1–25 to 0–10 defeat of Laois in the final. On 2 September 2018, Cluxton made his 200th appearance for Dublin when he captained the team to a record-equalling fourth successive All-Ireland SFC title after a 2–17 to 1–14 defeat of Tyrone in the final. In doing so he broke his own record by becoming the only player in the history of the championship to captain a team to four All-Ireland titles in-a-row. It was his fifth time captaining the team to the title while it was his sixth All-Ireland winners' medal overall. While his teammates celebrated, Cluxton took out a broom and swept the changing room floor.

Cluxton became his county's most capped player on 17 October 2020, overtaking Johnny McDonnell's record against Meath in the National League. On 19 December 2020, Cluxton won his eight All-Ireland SFC title and seventh as captain as Dublin defeated Mayo in the 2020 All-Ireland SFC final.

===== 2021–2023 =====
Cluxton was missing from the Dublin panel in both the 2021 League and Championship campaigns as Dublin shared the Allianz Division 1 Football League title with Kerry, and lost their first Championship match since 2014 against Mayo in the 2021 All-Ireland SFC semi-final, ending their quest for 7 consecutive All-Ireland SFC titles, and bringing the most successful and continuously dominant period in the history of Gaelic football to an end.

His absence was a discussion point in the media throughout the year, with some speculation as to whether no announcement was in-keeping with Cluxton's low profile personality, or whether the departure was more acrimonious in nature. On 8 January 2022, in the aftermath of Dublin's O'Byrne Cup victory over Offaly, Dublin manager Dessie Farrell announced that Cluxton would not be returning to the Dublin fold for the coming league and championship, seemingly all but confirming Cluxton's retirement.

However, despite his absence the previous two years, Cluxton was named as a substitute in Dublin's Round 7 Division 2 match against Louth in March 2023. This return came as a major surprise due to speculation of a falling out between Cluxton and Dublin manager Dessie Farrell.

On 30 July 2023, Cluxton was part of the Dublin team to with the 2023 All-Ireland SFC final.

In September 2025, it was announced that Cluxton would be joining the backroom team of the recently appointed Dublin senior manager Ger Brennan.

=== International rules ===
Cluxton made his debut appearance for Ireland in the International Rules Series during the 2002 test series won by Australia. He was part of the victorious Irish team during the 2004 International Rules Series, winning the Irish player of the tournament award.

Cluxton kept a clean sheet when he played in goal for Ireland in the 2010 International Rules Series in Limerick. Cluxton captained Ireland during the 2011 International Rules Series in Australia. Ireland went on to win the Series.

Injury ruled him out of the 2013 International Rules Series, with Paddy O'Rourke selected as goalkeeper.

== Reception ==
Cluxton has been described by some commentators as the "best Gaelic football goalkeeper of all time". Irish Times writer Malachy Clerkin described him as having had "one of the GAA's greatest careers", while Colm O'Rourke has described Cluxton as "the best goalkeeper I have seen".

== Personal life ==
As of 2012, Cluxton was a secondary school teacher, teaching biology at St. Vincent's C.B.S. in Glasnevin.

== Charity work ==
In April 2011, while participating in a charity association football match between Darndale F.C. and Liverpool/Manchester United Legends in aid of Autism Ireland, Cluxton clashed with former Republic of Ireland national football team player Jason McAteer. Cluxton and McAteer were both sent off.

== Career statistics ==
As of 18 July 2019

Appearances and scores by team, season and competition
Team	Season	National League			Leinster		All-Ireland		Total	
Team	Season	Division	Apps	Score	Apps	Score	Apps	Score	Apps	Score
Dublin	2001	Division 1A	0	0–0	2	0–0	0	0–0	2	0–0
Dublin	2002	Division 1A	5	0–0	3	0–0	3	0–0	11	0–0
Dublin	2003	Division 1A	5	0–0	2	0–0	2	0–0	9	0–0
Dublin	2004	Division 1A	5	0–0	0	0–0	5	0–0	10	0–0
Dublin	2005	Division 1A	6	0–0	4	0–0	2	0–0	12	0–0
Dublin	2006	Division 1A	6	0–0	3	0–0	2	0–0	11	0–0
Dublin	2007	Division 1A	7	0–0	4	0–0	2	0–0	13	0–0
Dublin	2008	Division 2	6	0–0	3	0–0	1	0–0	10	0–0
Dublin	2009	Division 1	6	0–0	3	0–0	1	0–0	10	0–0
Dublin	2010	Division 1	5	0–0	2	0–0	5	0–5	12	0–5
Dublin	2011	Division 1	6	0–0	3	0–6	3	0–6	12	0–12
Dublin	2012	Division 1	4	0–4	3	0–3	2	0–6	9	0–13
Dublin	2013	Division 1	7	0–4	3	0–7	3	0–9	13	0–20
Dublin	2014	Division 1	8	0–10	3	0–4	2	0–1	13	0–15
Dublin	2015	Division 1	6	0–0	3	0–0	4	0–1	13	0–1
Dublin	2016	Division 1	6	0–0	3	0–0	4	0–0	13	0–0
Dublin	2017	Division 1	8	0–0	3	0–0	3	0–0	14	0–0
Dublin	2018	Division 1	6	0–0	2	0–0	5	0–0	13	0–0
Dublin	2019	Division 1	2	0–0	3	0–0	1	0–0	6	0–0
Total			104	0–18	52	0–20	50	0–28	206	0–66

== Honours ==
=== Team ===
Dublin City University

- Sigerson Cup (1): 2006

Dublin

- All-Ireland Senior Football Championship (9): 2011, 2013 (c), 2015 (c), 2016 (c), 2017 (c), 2018 (c), 2019 (c), 2020 (c), 2023
- Leinster Senior Football Championship (18): 2002, 2005, 2006, 2007, 2008, 2009, 2011, 2012, 2013 (c), 2014 (c), 2015 (c), 2016 (c), 2017 (c), 2018 (c), 2019 (c), 2020 (c), 2023, 2024
- National Football League (5): 2013 (c), 2014 (c), 2015 (c), 2016 (c), 2018 (c)
- O'Byrne Cup (1): 2007
- Leinster Under-21 Football Championship (1): 2002
- Leinster Minor Football Championship (1): 1999

Ireland

- International Rules Series (2): 2004, 2011 (c)

=== Individual ===
Awards

- GAA-GPA All Stars Awards (7): 2002, 2006, 2007, 2011, 2013, 2019, 2023
- GPA Gaelic Team of the Year (2): 2006, 2007
- GAA/GPA Footballer of the Year (1): 2019
- The Sunday Game Team of the Year (1): 2023
- In May 2020, a public poll conducted by RTÉ.ie named Cluxton as goalkeeper in a team of footballers who had won All Stars during the era of The Sunday Game.
- Also in May 2020, the Irish Independent named Cluxton at number four in its "Top 20 footballers in Ireland over the past 50 years".

Sporting positions
Preceded by Bryan Cullen	Dublin Senior Football Captain; 2013–2020	Succeeded by Jonny Cooper

Awards and achievements
Preceded by Michael Murphy	All-Ireland SFC final winning captain 2013	Succeeded by Fionn Fitzgerald
Preceded by Fionn Fitzgerald	All-Ireland SFC final winning captain 2015–2020	Succeeded by Pádraig Hampsey
