= Michael McGee (Gaelic footballer) =

Irish Gaelic footballer

Personal information
- Native name: Micháel Mac Aoidh (Irish)
- Nickname: The Tongue
- Born: Tyrone, Northern Ireland
- Occupation: Civil Servant
- Height: 5 ft 9 in (175 cm)

Sport
- Sport: Gaelic football
- Position: Corner back
Club
- Years: Club
- Loughmacrory
Inter-county
- Years: County
- 1999-present: Tyrone
Inter-county titles
- Ulster titles: 5
- All-Irelands: 3
- NFL: 2
- All Stars: 0

Michael "Mickey" McGee is a former Gaelic footballer who played for the Loughmacrory club and the Tyrone county team.

== Awards ==
McGee has three All-Ireland Senior Football Championship winners' medals. He brought the first All-Ireland senior championship medal to his club, Loughmacrory, in 2003, the year Tyrone made the breakthrough at county senior level, and he won an All-Ireland minor medal with the county in 1998. From there he progressed to the Under-21 grade where he won two All-Ireland Under-21 championships in 2000 and 2001.

He helped Tyrone regain the Sam Maguire Cup in 2005.

McGee's 2007 and 2008 seasons were hampered by a shoulder injury, one of Tyrone's many long-term injuries.
