= Cathal McCarron =

Irish Gaelic footballer

Personal information
- Born: 9 November 1987 (age 38) Dromore, County Tyrone, Northern Ireland

Sport
- Sport: Gaelic football

Cathal McCarron (born 9 November 1987) is an All Ireland Winning Gaelic footballer for Tyrone. He plays his club football with Dromore St Dympna's, and has won 3 club championships with them. He has also played for Round Towers while in London since 2013, with the county team there interested in him.

McCarron has been nominated for an All Star 3 times due to his performances with Tyrone, and helped his team to the 2013 All-Ireland Senior Football Championship semi-final, which they lost to Mayo. He has coached the game for charity. He has also spoken publicly of his gambling addiction.

In April 2014 multiple pornographic videos of McCarron surfaced on a gay-for-pay website. According to Queerty, McCarron deleted his social media accounts following the discovery of the video and homophobic abuse he received on social media sites.

On 20 October 2016 McCarron released his autobiography Out of Control in Ireland and the United Kingdom. The book discusses his experience appearing in a gay porn film and his gambling addiction.

In March of 2019, McCarron announced his retirement from county football.
