= Ciaran Gourley =

Irish Gaelic footballer

Personal information
- Nickname: The Gourlemator Gourlad
- Born: Rock
- Occupation: Teacher
- Height: 6 ft 0 in (183 cm)

Sport
- Sport: Gaelic football
- Position: Corner Back
Club
- Years: Club
- Rock GAA
Inter-county
- Years: County
- ? 2011: Tyrone
Inter-county titles
- Ulster titles: 3
- All-Irelands: 3
- NFL: 1

Ciaran Gourley is a Gaelic footballer for the Tyrone county team. He is a three-time All-Ireland-winner with his county. In 2008, he topped off his season by managing St Patrick's Academy, Dungannon to MacRory Cup and Hogan Cup successes.
