= Kieran O'Leary =

Irish Gaelic footballer

Personal information
- Native name: Ciarán Ó Laoire (Irish)
- Born: 28 July 1987 (age 39) Tralee, Ireland
- Occupation: Sales Assistant
- Height: 1.76 m (5 ft 9 in)

Sport
- Sport: Gaelic Football
- Position: Right Corner Forward
Club
- Years: Club
- 2004-: Dr Crokes
Club titles
- Kerry titles: 8
- Munster titles: 6
- All-Ireland Titles: 1
Inter-county
Years	County	Apps (scores)
2006-2014	Kerry	23 (0-12)
Inter-county titles
- Munster titles: 5
- All-Irelands: 3
- NFL: 2
- All Stars: 0

Kieran O'Leary (born 28 July 1987) is an Irish Gaelic footballer. He plays at U21 and senior levels with the Dr Crokes club team and the Kerry county team. With Dr. Crokes he reached the 2007 All-Ireland Senior Club Football Championship final on St. Patrick's Day. With Kerry he won an All-Ireland senior medal as a sub that September, and the 2008 All-Ireland Under-21 Football Championship.

== Honours ==
- 3 All-Ireland Football Championships - 2006, 2007, 2014
- 1 All-Ireland Under 21 Championship - 2008
- 5 Munster Senior Football Championships - 2007, 2010, 2011, 2013, 2014
- 1 Munster Under 21 Football Championship - 2008
- 1 Munster Minor Football Championship - 2004
- 8 Kerry County Championships - 2010, 2011, 2012, 2013, 2016, 2017, 2018, 2024
- 6 Munster Senior Club Championships - 2006, 2011, 2012, 2013, 2016, 2018
- 1 All Ireland Senior Club Championship - 2017
