= Aidan O'Shea (Kerry Gaelic footballer) =

Kerry Gaelic footballer

Personal information
- Native name: Aodhán Ó Sé (Irish)
- Born: County Kerry, Ireland

Sport
- Sport: Gaelic football
- Position: Full Back
Club
- Years: Club
- Present: Glenbeigh-Glencar
Inter-county
Years	County	Apps (scores)
2009-	Kerry	2 (0-0)
Inter-county titles
- Munster titles: 0
- All-Irelands: 0
- All Stars: 0

Aidan O'Shea (born 1985 in County Kerry) is an Irish Gaelic footballer from Glenbeigh-Glencar in County Kerry. He is a PE Teacher and Geography teacher at Mercy Mounthawk, Tralee, 6 ft 3 in (191 cm) tall and weighs 14 stone (89 kg). He is the son of Kerry legend Jack O'Shea.

== Football career ==
Aged 23 he was selected for the Kerry Panel for the 2008 National League campaign but didn't make his debut for Kerry until the 2009 National League. His first game for the Kerry senior team was on Sunday, 1 February 2009 versus Donegal. O'Shea started as Right Wing Back and played most of the game until he was replaced by Daniel Bohane. During Kerry's second game in the League versus Tyrone he was moved to Left Wing Back but was replaced by Brian Moran after he received a yellow card (during the 2009 League the GAA experimented with new rules whereby yellow carded players had to be replaced). O'Shea did not play in the third game versus Derry but was selected for the next game versus Mayo and started as Full Back. Kerry were struggling to find a Full Back and tried out O'Shea in that position since he plays in that position for his club Glenbeigh-Glencar. He was replaced after 50 minutes by Aidan O'Mahony. In Kerry's games versus Westmeath and Dublin he started as Full Back but in the game versus Dublin he was replaced by Daniel Bohane. O'Shea injured himself in that game and did not play in the game versus Galway. He did not start in the 2009 League Final but did come on after 72 minutes for Pádraig Reidy as a Left Full Back.

O'Shea did not play in Kerry's first two games in the 2009 Championship versus Cork but will start as Right Wing Back in Kerry's first qualifier game versus Longford. This was his championship début.

O'Shea suffered an injury-ridden year throughout 2010, with knee surgery and a serious groin injury preventing him from playing for the duration of the year.
