= Ryan Mellon =

Irish Gaelic footballer

Personal information
- Native name: Rían Ó Mealláin (Irish)
- Born: 22 September 1980 (age 46) County Tyrone, Northern Ireland
- Occupation: Claims Manager
- Height: 6 ft 0 in (183 cm)

Sport
- Sport: Gaelic football
- Position: Left Half Forward
Club
- Years: Club
- Moy
Inter-county
- Years: County
- 2003-2010: Tyrone
Inter-county titles
- All-Irelands: 2
- NFL: 1

Ryan Mellon is a former Gaelic footballer who played for the Moy club and the Tyrone county team.

Mellon was part of Tyrone's All-Ireland and league winning team of 2005. Mellon scored two goals in the final group stage match of the 2005 league which denied then champions Kerry a place in the semi-finals; although Tyrone lost 2–17 to 3–8, the county progressed and went on to win the league. Mellon retired from inter-county football in late 2010.
