= Séamus Scanlon =

Kerry Gaelic footballer

Personal information
- Native name: Séamus Ó Scanláin (Irish)
- Nickname: Moosey
- Born: 15 November 1981 (age 44) Cork, Ireland
- Occupation: Machinist
- Height: 6 ft 3 in (191 cm)

Sport
- Sport: Gaelic football
- Position: Midfield
Club
Years	Club	Apps (scores)
2000–	Currow	45 (0–16)
Club titles
- Kerry titles: 1 (Intermediate, 2013)
- Munster titles: 0
Inter-county
Years	County	Apps (scores)
2002–2013	Kerry	45 (0–16)
Inter-county titles
- Munster titles: 3
- All-Irelands: 3
- NFL: 4
- All Stars: 1

Séamus 'Moosey' Scanlon (Irish - Séamas Ó Scanláin, born 1981) is an Irish Gaelic footballer who plays for the Currow club, the St Kieran's divisional team and the Kerry county team. He first came on the Kerry senior scene in 2002 under the management of Páidí Ó Sé. However Scanlon failed to establish himself as a regular until 2007 due to serious competition from William Kirby, Eoin Brosnan and Tommy Griffin. Since then he has started regularly in midfield, winning the Munster Senior Football Championship and All-Ireland Senior Football Championship with Kerry. He has won 3 All-Ireland medals in 2006, 2007 and 2009. In recognition of his efforts during the 2009 championship, he was awarded with an All-Star. Scanlon had become the senior midfield figure for Kerry since the retirement of Darragh Ó Sé in 2010.
