= Alan O'Connor (Gaelic footballer) =

Irish Gaelic footballer

Personal information
- Native name: Ailéin Ó Conchubhair (Irish)
- Born: 2 June 1985 (age 41) Lucan, County Dublin, Ireland
- Occupation: Electrician
- Height: 6 ft 4 in (193 cm)

Sport
- Sport: Gaelic Football
- Position: Midfield
Clubs
- Years: Club
- Lucan Sarsfields; St Colum's; Carbery
Club titles
- Cork titles: 1
Inter-county*
Years	County	Apps (scores)
2008-2017	Cork	42 (0-05)
Inter-county titles
- Munster titles: 3
- All-Irelands: 1
- NFL: 3
- All Stars: 0
- *Inter County team apps and scores correct as of 19:15, 16 October 2017.

Alan O'Connor (born 2 June 1985) is an Irish Gaelic footballer. His league and championship career with the Cork senior team spanned ten seasons from 2008 to 2017.

Born in Lucan, Dublin, O'Connor arrived on the inter-county scene at the age of seventeen when he first linked up with the Cork minor team, before later joining the under-21 and junior sides. He made his senior debut in the 2008 championship. O'Connor went on to play a key role on the team for five years, and won one All-Ireland medal, three Munster medals and three National Football League medals. He was an All-Ireland runner-up on one occasion.

O'Connor represented the Munster inter-provincial team on a number of occasions throughout his career, winning one Railway Cup medal. At club level he won one championship medal with divisional side Carbery while also playing for St Colum's.

O'Connor announced his retirement from inter-county football on 18 November 2013. He returned to the panel in May 2015.

== Career statistics ==
Team	Year	National League			Munster		All-Ireland		Total	
Team	Year	Division	Apps	Score	Apps	Score	Apps	Score	Apps	Score
Cork	2008	Division 2	4	0-01	2	0-00	2	0-00	8	0-01
Cork	2009	Division 2	8	0-04	4	0-00	3	0-01	15	0-05
Cork	2010	Division 1	6	0-02	2	0-01	6	0-01	14	0-04
Cork	2011	Division 1	7	0-01	3	0-02	2	0-00	12	0-03
Cork	2012	Division 1	8	1-03	1	0-00	2	0-00	11	1-03
Cork	2013	Division 1	4	0-00	3	0-00	2	0-00	9	0-00
Cork	2014	Division 1	–		–		–		–	
Cork	2015	Division 1	–		3	0-00	1	0-00	4	0-00
Cork	2016	Division 1	0	0-00	0	0-00	3	0-00	3	0-00
Cork	2017	Division 2	1	0-00	2	0-00	1	0-00	4	0-00
Total			38	1-11	20	0-03	22	0-02	80	1-16

== Honours ==
St Colum's

- Cork Junior B Hurling Championship (1): 2003
- West Cork Junior Football Championship (1): 2003

Carbery

- Cork Senior Football Championship (1): 2004

Cork

- All-Ireland Senior Football Championship (1): 2010
- Munster Senior Football Championship (3): 2008, 2009, 2012
- National Football League (Division 1) (3): 2010, 2011, 2012
- National Football League (Division 2) (1): 2009
- All-Ireland Junior Football Championship (2): 2005, 2007
- Munster Junior Football Championship (2): 2005, 2007
- Munster Under-21 Football Championship (2): 2004, 2005, 2006

Munster

- Railway Cup (1): 2008
