= Colm McCullagh =

Irish Gaelic footballer

Personal information
- Born: Tyrone, Northern Ireland
- Occupation: Leisure Manager
- Height: 5 ft 08 in (173 cm)

Sport
- Sport: Gaelic football
- Position: Full Forward
Club
- Years: Club
- Dromore St Dympna's
Club titles
- Tyrone titles: 3
- Ulster titles: 0
Inter-county
- Years: County
- 2005-2010: Tyrone
Inter-county titles
- Ulster titles: 3 (2007 2009 2010)
- All-Irelands: 2 (2005 2008)
- NFL: 0
- All Stars: 0

Colm McCullagh is a former Gaelic footballer who played for the Dromore St Dympna's club and the Tyrone county team. He was a member of the 2005 All-Ireland SFC winning panel with his county and won the League and Championship double with his club in 2007.

After quitting association football in 2006 after he left Newry City, McCullagh became a more prominent member of the Tyrone set-up, scoring three points in Tyrone's opening National League game, a draw with Kildare.

In 2008, he played a big part in Tyrone's All-Ireland SFC-winning season, with more than one or two man-of-the-match performances.

McCullagh retired from inter-county football in November 2010, due to family and work commitments.
