= Paul Flynn (Gaelic footballer) =

Dublin Gaelic footballer

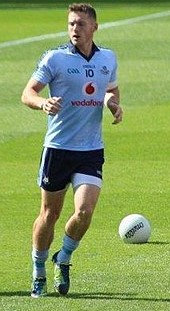

Personal information
- Native name: Pól Ó Floinn (Irish)
- Born: 8 July 1986 (age 40) Dublin, Ireland
- Height: 1.85 m (6 ft 1 in)

Sport
- Sport: Gaelic football
- Position: Right Half Forward
Club
- Years: Club
- 2003–: Fingallians
College
- Years: College
- DCU
College titles
- Sigerson titles: 2
Inter-county
Years	County	Apps (scores)
2008–2019	Dublin	35 (3–33)
Inter-county titles
- Leinster titles: 10
- All-Irelands: 6
- NFL: 5
- All Stars: 4

Paul Flynn (born 8 July 1986) is a Gaelic footballer who plays for Fingallians and, formerly, for the Dublin county team. He is from Swords, County Dublin. He has received four All Star Awards in 2011, 2012, 2013, 2014 and represented Ireland in the Compromise Rules games in Croke Park and Cavan in 2013. He roomed with fellow DCU team-mates, Michael Murphy and Aidan Walsh. Paul Flynn was the Dublin player to receive four consecutive All Stars in the qualifier era of second chances.

== Playing career ==
Flynn made his Dublin debut when appearing as a second-half substitute in Dublin's first-round O'Byrne Cup victory over Wicklow on 5 January 2008 in Parnell Park. Flynn made his National Football League debut for Dublin against Westmeath and scored a goal in the process, helping guide his team to a first-round victory.

He made his Championship debut against Westmeath on 29 June 2008. On 18 September 2011, Flynn helped Dublin claim their first All-Ireland title in sixteen years, as they beat Kerry at Croke Park. He was awarded his first All Star Award for his performances for Dublin in the half forwards in 2011. Under Pat Gilroy's management term Paul Flynn became a regular in the Dublin half-forward line and was selected as Dublin's lone All Star in 2012. In 2013, he complained about a lack of intensity of the Dubs and he brought amazing fitness levels and intensity to the team. On 22 September 2013, Dublin won the All-Ireland Senior Football Championship with a big help from Paul Flynn in the half-forward line wearing number 10. He played twice for Ireland against Australia in the 2013 International Rules Series. In 2016 Flynn helped his club Fingallians to win the Dublin Intermediate Club Championship. That same year they went on to reach the semi-final of the Leinster Intermediate Club Championship which included a victory over St Josephs of Louth in the process before losing to Rosemount of Westmeath in that semi-final.

In May 2019, it was confirmed that Flynn had stepped away from the Dublin senior football team.

== All Stars ==
Flynn received his first ever all star in 2011 after winning the All Ireland football title with Dublin alongside teammates Alan Brogan (footballer of the year), Bernard Brogan, Kevin Nolan, Stephen Cluxton and Michael Darragh Macauley.

In 2012 after reaching the All Ireland Semi-Final and losing to Mayo, he was selected as Dublin's lone All Star alongside roommate and friend Michael Murphy.

After clinching his second All Ireland senior football title in September 2013, he was again selected as an all star. This became Paul's third All Star in a row.

In 2014 Dublin made it to the All Ireland Semi-Final, but this time losing to Donegal. Flynn was selected as an all star for the fourth year in a row. But due to his sister's wedding he did not show at the All Star banquet. He later accepted the award from club member and Dublin Legend Ciaran Duff at a celebration in Fingallians GAA Club with many club members, family and friends present. This was the first time anyone has won four in a row since Jack O'Shea (six in a row from 1980 to 1986) and Kerry team-mate Páidí Ó Sé (five in a row from 1981 to 1985) 30 years ago. He is also the first to win four all stars in a row in the qualifier era of second chances. Flynn's achievement, both in terms of overall awards won and in earning the distinction of becoming the first to win four in a row in almost 30 years, ranks high up in the overall All Stars hall of fame.

== Honours ==
Dublin

- All-Ireland Senior Football Championship (6): 2011, 2013, 2015, 2016, 2017, 2018
- Leinster Senior Football Championship (10): 2008, 2009, 2011, 2012, 2013, 2014, 2015, 2016, 2017, 2018
- National Football League (5): 2013, 2014, 2015, 2016, 2018

=== Individual ===
Awards

- GAA-GPA All Stars Awards (4): 2011, 2012, 2013, 2014
