= Tommy Griffin =

Irish Gaelic footballer

Personal information
- Native name: Tomás Ó Grifín (Irish)
- Born: 12 April 1978 (age 48) Tralee, Ireland
- Height: 1.88 m (6 ft 2 in)

Sport
- Sport: Gaelic Football
- Position: Midfield
Club
- Years: Club
- 1995-2012: An Daingean
Inter-county
Years	County	Apps (scores)
2000-2011	Kerry	40 (0-01)
Inter-county titles
- Munster titles: 6
- All-Irelands: 5
- NFL: 3
- All Stars: 0

Tommy Griffin is a former Irish Gaelic football player for Kerry and An Daingean.

== Playing career ==
=== Club ===
At club level Griffin lined out with Dingle GAA. He won Kerry Intermediate Football Championship titles in 1996 and 2004. He also won a number of West Kerry Senior football league and championship titles during his playing days.

=== Schools ===
Griffin won Munster and All Ireland Colleges Medals 'B' with Dingle CBS in 1996.

=== Minor ===
He first came on the intercounty scene in 1996 as part of the Kerry minor team. He was midfield as Kerry overcame Cork in the Munster Minor Football Championship final. He was again midfield as Kerry overcame Mayo in the All-Ireland semi-final. He missed out on the All-Ireland final loss to Laois.

=== Under 21 ===
Griffin joined the Kerry Under 21 team straight out of minor level in 1997. He appeared in the Munster championship win over Clare before starting at midfield for the Munster final with Cork. The sides finished level, but Griffin played no part in the re-play.

He was a regular in the team in 1998. He scored a point in the Munster final win over Tipperary. He was again midfield for the All-Ireland semi-final win over Armagh. In the All-Ireland final Kerry went into the game as underdogs against a start studded Laois team. In the end it was Griffin and co who were celebrating after a 2-08 to 0-11 win and an All-Ireland title.

Wins over Waterford, Limerick and Cork seen Griffin win his second Munster title. The All-Ireland semi-final seen the Kingdom overcome Roscommon and another All-Ireland final. While the year before Kerry were underdogs they were seen as big favorites for the clash with Wetmeath. However in the end the title went to the Leinster side with a bit to spare on a 1-12 to 0-09 scoreline.

=== Junior ===
Despite winning an All-Ireland senior title, by 2003 Griffin found himself out of the reckoning with the Kerry senior team, He joined the counties Junior team that season. A win over Tipperary seen Kerry qualify for the Munster final. In the final Kerry faced Cork and Griffin played a key role at midfield. He scored two points as Kerry took the title on a 2-09 to 0-14 win and gave Griffin a clean swap of minor, Under 21, Junior and Senior Munster titles. Kerry lost out to Meath in the All-Ireland semi-final.

=== Senior ===
He was soon promoted to the senior panel and played four times during the 1999/00 National League. His championship debut was in the Munster Senior Football Championship final win over Clare. His next appearance would be during the All-Ireland semi-final re-play win over Armagh, a game Kerry won after extra time. He again would appear in the re-play of the All-Ireland Senior Football Championship final win over Galway, giving Griffin his first All-Ireland medal.

Griffins game time was limited during 2001. His only National League game was in the final round against Galway. In played in the Munster championship win over Tipperary. He wouldn't play again until the All-Ireland semi-final with Meath. It was a bad day at the office however, as Kerry suffered one of their biggest championship losses.

The loss to Meath would turn out to be Griffin last game at senior level for a number of seasons.

After a few seasons away Griffin returned to the side under new manager Jack O Connor. He played during the 2004 National Football League. He made his first championship appearance since 2001 when he came on as a sub during the Munster final clash with Limerick, making a big impact as the sides ended level. He again appeared as a sub for the re-play as Kerry took the title and gave Griffin his second Munster title. His next appearance was in the All-Ireland semi-final win over Derry. He played no part in the All-Ireland final win over Mayo.

He played no part in either the 2005 National League or Championship.

He returned during the 2006 National Football League, he appeared as a sub as Kerry overcame Galway in the final to give Griffin his first league title. Griffin appeared as a sub in Munster championship wins over Waterford and Tipperary as Kerry qualified for another Munster final with Cork. The sides finished level in Killarney on a 10 points each scoreline with Griffin again coming in as a sub. The replay was a bad day at the office for Kerry as they were well beaten on a 1-12 to 0-09 scoreline. Kerry were drawn to face Longford in the qualifiers and there was big change. Griffin was handed his first championship start at Midfield, six years on from his debut, for the clash and also scored his one and only point at senior level in a 4-11 to 1-11 win. Kerry went into their quarter-final clash with Armagh as underdogs. However Kerry put in a huge display in a 3-15 to 1-13 win. The All-Ireland semi-final was a repeat of the Munster final when for the second season in a row Kerry faced Cork. In the end Griffin and co avenged their Munster final loss after a 0-16 to 0-10 win. For the second time in three seasons it was a Kerry Mayo All-Ireland final. Griffin was again at midfield as The Kingdom blitzed the Westerners and took the title on a 4-15 to 3-05 scoreline. The win seen Griffin pick up his second All-Ireland medal.

Griffin played in all but one of Kerry's 2007 National Football League. He picked up a third Munster title when he came on as a sub in the final win over Cork. He again appeared as a sub in Quarter and Semi-final wins over Monaghan and Dublin. This set up a historic All-Ireland final win Cork. Griffin picked up his third All-Ireland medal on the field after a 3-13 to 1-09 win.

He again played in all but one of Kerry's 2008 National Football League, missing the final loss to Derry. He made his first championship start since the 2006 All-Ireland final lining out in the half back line in the Munster semi-final clash with Clare. He was again a sub as he picked up a fourth Munster title with another win over Cork in the final. He again appeared as a sub in the All-Ireland Quarter-final win over Galway. He was back in the starting 15 for the All-Ireland semi-final with Cork at full back, in a game that ended in a draw. He was full back once again for the re-play as Kerry booked another All-Ireland final appearance. In a surprise to many Griffin was dropped for the final clash with Tyrone. He did appear but couldn't do anything as the title went to the Ulster men.

He again played in all but one of Kerry's 2009 National Football League. He was at Right half back as he won a second League medal after a win over Derry in the final. Griffin and co had a disappointing Munster semi-final loss to Cork after a replay. Qualifier wins over Longford, Sligo and Antrim seen Kerry back in Croke Park to face Dublin. Despite being underdogs going into the game powered to a 1-24 to 1-07 win. A semi-final win over Meath seen Kerry qualify for a sixth All-Ireland final in a row. For the second time in three seasons Kerry faced Cork. Griffin had a poor start as Colm O'Neill scored an early goal. Kerry regrouped and came out winners on a 0-16 to 1-09 scoreline and a fourth All-Ireland medal for Griffin.

He played in all of Kerry's 2010 National Football League as they failed to retain their title. He win Full back as Kerry overcame Tipperary in the opening round. This set up a Munster semi-final with holders Cork. The sides finished level 0-15 each in Killarney. The re-play would be one of the games of the year as extra-time was needed to decide the clash, with the Kerrymen winning out on a 1-15 to 1-14 scoreline. The Munster final seen Kerry face Limerick. Despite a slow start Griffin picked up his fourth and final Munster title. The win set up an All-Ireland Quarter-final clash with Down. It was a disappointing day in Croke Park for the Munster champions as the Ulster side won out 1-16 to 1-10 in a game that would turn out to be Grlffin's last with Kerry.

He picked up another Munster title as a member of the panel in 2011 and was also on the panel when Kerry lost out to Dublin in the All-Ireland final but played no part during the season.

== Honours ==
- All-Ireland Senior Football Championship (5) 2000 2004 (sub) 2006 2007 2009
- Munster Senior Football Championship (6) 2000 2001 2004 2007 2010 2011 (sub)
- National Football League Division 1 2004 (sub) 2006 2009
- All Ireland Under 21 Football Championship (1) 1998
- Munster Under-21 Football Championship (2) 1998 1999
- Munster Minor Football Championship (1) 1996
- Munster Junior Football Championship (1) 2003
- McGrath Cup (1) 2010
- All-Ireland Colleges (1) 1996
