= Eoin Brosnan =

Irish Gaelic football player

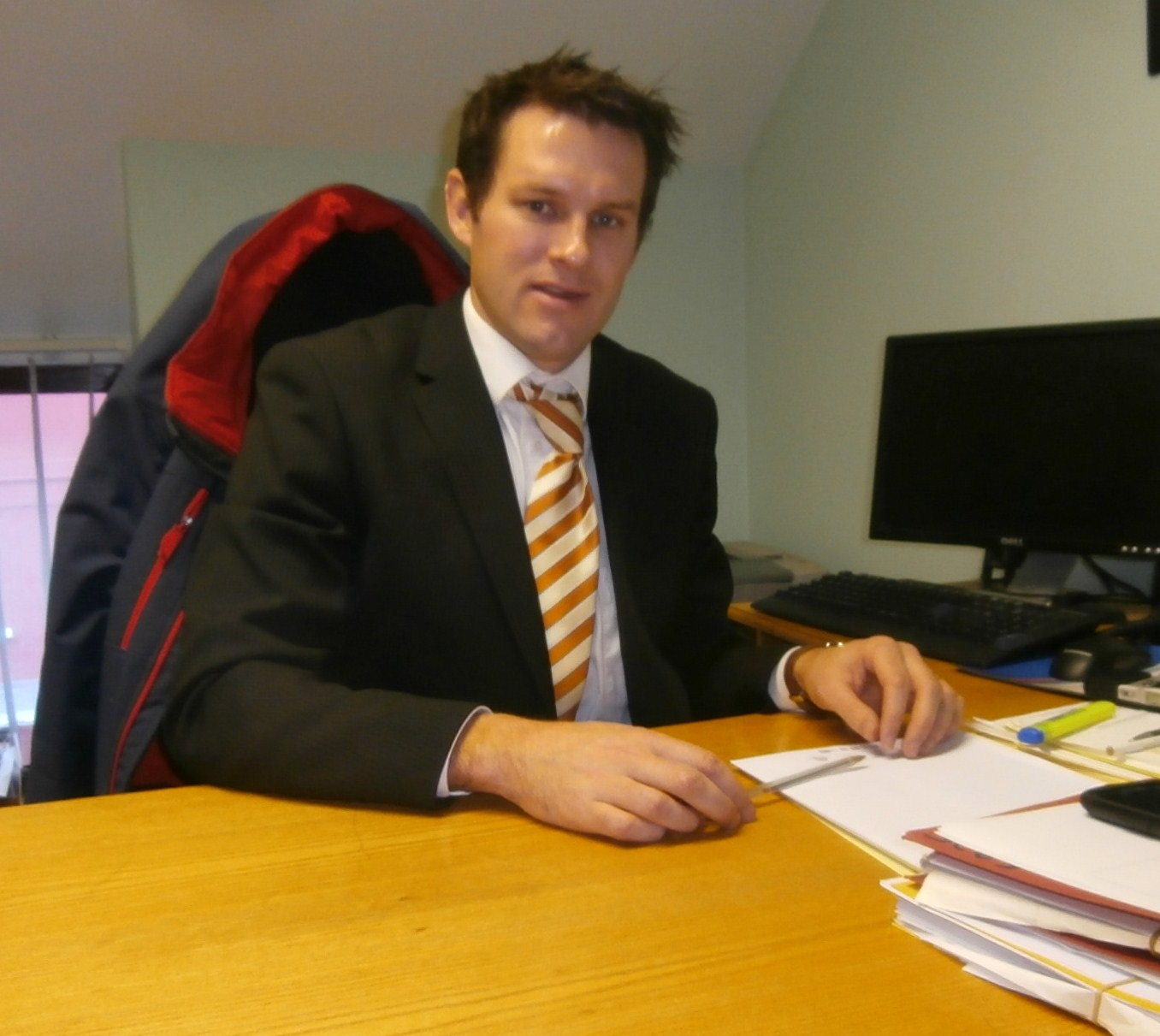
- Brosnan at work

Personal information
- Native name: Eóin Ó Brosnacháin (Irish)
- Born: Killarney, Republic of Ireland
- Occupation: Solicitor
- Height: 1.88 m (6 ft 2 in)

Sport
- Sport: Gaelic Football
- Position: Left Half Forward
Club
- Years: Club
- Dr Crokes
Club titles
- Kerry titles: 8
- Munster titles: 6
- All-Ireland Titles: 1
Inter-county
Years	County	Apps (scores)
2001-2009 2011-2013	Kerry; Kerry	53 (15-42)
Inter-county titles
- Munster titles: 7
- All-Irelands: 3
- NFL: 2

Eoin Brosnan, born c.1980, is an Irish Gaelic football player who plays at centre forward. He is a former member of the Kerry senior county team and plays his club football for Dr Crokes. As of late 2021, he was a practicing solicitor, working from a practice in Killarney.

== Playing career ==
=== Inter-county ===
Brosnan made his Kerry Senior debut against Louth in 2000. He won the All-Ireland Senior Football Championship title with Kerry on three occasions - 2004, 2006 and 2007. The 2004 and 2006 finals were played against Mayo, while the 2007 final was against Cork. In the 2006 tie, Brosnan came on as a substitute in place of Tomás Ó Sé against Mayo and scored 1-01. In the 2007 game he scored one point and set up another. In 2008, Kerry again reached the All-Ireland final, but lost to Tyrone, and there was some criticism of the decision to select Brosnan. He also won two National League titles (2004 and 2006) and five Munster Championship medals (2001, 2003, 2004, 2005, 2007, 2011, 2013) with Kerry. Brosnan retired from Inter-county football in December 2013.

=== Club ===
In 2000, Brosnan won a Kerry Senior Football Championship medal with Dr. Crokes. In 2006, Brosnan and Dr. Crokes were defeated in the Kerry Senior Football Championship final by South Kerry. However, Crokes qualified to represent the county in the 2006 Munster Senior Club Football Championship because South Kerry are a divisional side and not a club. They won the competition. Brosnan scored a vital goal in the replayed All-Ireland semi-final. The team went on to reach All-Ireland Senior Club Football Championship final, but lost to Crossmaglen Rangers after a replay.

He has also won a Cork Senior Football Championship medal and Munster Club Championship medal with UCC.

=== International Rules ===
Brosnan represented Ireland in the 2004 and 2005 International Rules Series.
