= List of Tyrone inter-county footballers =

This is a very incomplete list of Gaelic footballers who have played at senior level for the Tyrone county team.

== List of players ==
=== B ===
- Mark Bradley
- Rory Brennan

=== C ===
- Darragh Canavan
- Pascal Canavan
- Peter Canavan
- Ruairí Canavan
- Dermot Carlin
- Colm Cavanagh: 13 seasons, until 2020
- Seán Cavanagh: Until 2017
- Gerard Cavlan
- Kyle Coney
- Adrian Cush

=== D ===
- John Devine
- Fay Devlin
- Gavin Devlin
- Plunkett Donaghy
- Frankie Donnelly
- Mattie Donnelly
- Brian Dooher: 16 years, until 2011

=== G ===
- Conor Gormley: Until 2014
- Jody Gormley
- Niall Gormley
- Ciaran Gourley

=== H ===
- Pádraig Hampsey
- David Harte
- Mark Harte
- Peter Harte
- Colin Holmes
- Kevin Hughes

=== J ===
- Iggy Jones
- Philip Jordan

=== K ===
- Brian Kennedy
- Mick Kerr
- Pat King

=== L ===
- Chris Lawn
- Feargal Logan
- Harry Loughran: Until 2021
- John Lynch

=== M ===
- Conor McAliskey
- Cormac McAnallen
- Kevin McCabe
- Tiernan McCann
- Damien McCaul
- Finbar McConnell
- Pascal McConnell
- Colm McCullagh
- Darren McCurry
- Kieran McGeary
- Michael McGee
- Cormac McGinley
- Enda McGinley
- Brian McGuigan
- Frank McGuigan
- Tommy McGuigan
- Conor McKenna
- Eugene McKenna
- Michael McKernan
- Joe McMahon
- Justin McMahon: Until 2017, 110 appearances, with his debut against Fermanagh in the 2007 National League, 40 championship appearances, with his championship debut against Monaghan in the 2007 Ulster SFC final
- Ryan McMenamin: 13 years, until 2012
- Ronan McNamee
- Cathal McShane
- Ryan Mellon
- Conor Meyler
- Niall Morgan
- Owen Mulligan
- Mickey Murphy

=== O ===
- Damien O'Hagan
- John Joe O'Hagan
- Jody O'Neill
- Ronan O'Neill
- Stephen O'Neill: Retired in 2008, then returned until 2014

=== P ===
- Martin Penrose: Until 2014

=== Q ===
- Lorcan Quinn

=== R ===
- Frank Rodgers

=== S ===
- Niall Sludden
