= History of the Tyrone county football team =

Gaelic football team history

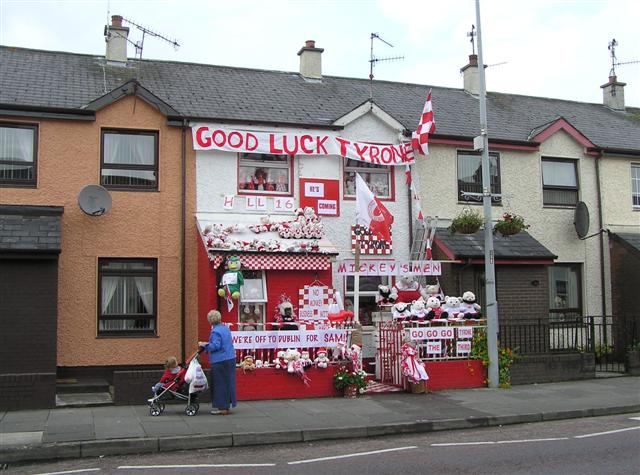
A house in Strabane decorated in the Tyrone colours prior to the 2008 All-Ireland Football final.

Tyrone has been represented in Gaelic football for nearly a century. The team won the All-Ireland Senior Football Championship in 2003, 2005, 2008, and 2021.

== Pre-1980s ==
Tyrone first won the Ulster Championship in 1956, and won again in 1957. The team included the legendary Iggy Jones and Frankie Donnelly. Tyrone did not win a third Ulster title until 1973.

The Tyrone Minors won the All-Ireland in 1947, 1948 and 1973. During 1973, Frank McGuigan, who captained the minor team, was also part of the Under-21 and Senior teams that won their Ulster Championships.

== 1980s ==
Tyrone's first nationally successful era came in the mid-eighties with a star-studded team that included players such as Frank McGuigan, Eugene McKenna, Plunkett Donaghy, and John Lynch.

In 1980, Kevin McCabe made history as Tyrone's first ever winner of an All Star Award.

In 1984, Tyrone won their fourth Ulster Championship, with Frank McGuigan's display in the Ulster Final against Armagh considered among the finest individual performances ever seen in Gaelic Games. He scored eleven points from open play, five with each foot, and one fisted over. In 2004, his display was voted as one of the Top 20 GAA Moments of the previous forty years (i.e. since the dawn of televised matches). McGuigan won an All-Star that year, as did Eugene McKenna.

=== 1986 ===
In 1986, Tyrone reached their very first All-Ireland Final. However, they were the rank outsiders to beat Kerry, who were going for their third title in a row (and eighth in twelve years). At one stage in the second half, Tyrone had amassed a seven-point lead (a penalty that could have put them nine points ahead was struck over the bar by Kevin McCabe), but two of their leading players on the day, Eugene McKenna, and John Lynch had to be replaced due to injury, and the experience of Kerry shone through, going on to win by 2–15 to 1–10 (21 points to 13). An unprecedented four Tyrone players won All-Star Awards that year, Plunkett Donaghy, John Lynch, Damien O'Hagan and Eugene McKenna won his second.

Tyrone beat Donegal in the replayed 1989 Ulster Final, with Plunkett Donaghy leading the team out that day. Eugene McKenna received his third All Star award that year, making him the leading representative of Tyrone in the All-Star stakes.

== 1990s ==
The Tyrone Seniors went through a relatively dry patch in the early nineties (although the standard of Ulster Football had developed immeasurably – by 1994, three different Ulster teams had won the All-Ireland four times in a row), however the Under 21 team was making waves. Led by Peter Canavan, the underage team reached three All-Ireland Finals, winning two in a row in 1991, and 1992. That team included young players like Adrian Cush, and Jody Gormley.

As that young team graduated to the Senior ranks, they brought their winning ways with them. In 1994, Tyrone reached the Ulster Final, being defeated by eventual All-Ireland winners – who possessed the crux of their 1991 All-Ireland-winning team – Down. Although through this defeat a young talent was emerging, becoming Ulster's top scorer, and duly winning his first All Star – Peter Canavan.

=== 1995 ===
1995 was another year for Tyrone. Having defeated Fermanagh in the first round, Tyrone faced 1993 All-Ireland winners, Derry in the Ulster Semi-final. Despite going 0–8 to 0–5 down by half time and having two players sent off, Tyrone rode through the heat and emerged as winners by a point. The match will probably be remembered by outsiders because of the many incidents of fighting between the teams – including a ten-man fight on the pitch, and Pascal Canavan twice elbowing and twice punching a Derry player, which got him sent off.

In the Ulster Final, Tyrone were playing Cavan, and were probably considered favorites. With the matched poised in the closing stages, Tyrone's two "super-subs", Matt McGleenan and Adrian Cush, teamed up to score the first of Tyrone's two goals. Cush lobbed the ball towards the goal, and McGleenan fisted it into the net. McGleenan became known within Tyrone because of this fisted goal. When Adrian Cush scored the second goal with less than two minutes remaining, the jubilant Tyrone fans (who were already lining the pitch) initiated a premature pitch invasion. However, they quickly broke, avoiding the possibility of the match being abandoned.

In the next game, the All-Ireland Semi-final, Tyrone beat Galway, with Peter Canavan leading the team with a personal tally of 1–07.

In the All-Ireland Final against Dublin, Tyrone took an early lead, just as they had in 1986, but the Dubs fought back, and ended up winning the match by a single point, 1–10 to 0–12. Peter Canavan had scored eleven points that day, but still ended up on the losing side. Tyrone fans remember the final with bitter taste, due to a few controversial decisions by referee, Paddy Russell. Russell sent Charlie Redmond off, but the player didn't leave the pitch for several minutes, meaning they were fielding an ineligible player, before he was instructed for a second time to leave the field. Also, with seconds remaining, and Tyrone down by a point, Russell (who was blindsided) adjudged Canavan to have touched the ball in the ground, when he was passing it to teammate, Sean McLaughlin. McLaughlin put the ball over the bar, but the point was not counted. Despite reaching the All-Ireland Final, only two Tyrone players won All-Stars in 1995, Peter Canavan and Fay Devlin.

=== 1996 ===
In 1996, Tyrone defended their Ulster crown by beating Down in a rematch of the 1994 final.

Tyrone met a Meath team in the All-Ireland Semi-final. Having played a competitive first half, the country witnessed the emergence of Brian Dooher, and Gerard Cavlan.

Tyrone fans remember this match because of the perceived "dirty" tactics by Meath. Several of Tyrone's key players sustained injuries during the second half of the match, including Peter Canavan, who subsequently found out he had been playing with a broken foot. Brian Dooher and Ciaran McBride both had their heads heavily bandaged during the match (and had to receive staples to close the wounds during half time). The Managers' hands were tied, because they had used up their tally of three substitutions.

Two representatives from Tyrone were in the 1996 All-Star team, Finbar McConnell, and Peter Canavan, with his third in a row, matched Eugene McKenna's personal tally.

Tyrone's management team of Eugene McKenna and Art McRory stepped down after this defeat, and Danny Ball took over the reins. While under Ball's stewardship, Tyrone didn't reach another Senior Ulster final.

In 1998, the Tyrone Minors won the All-Ireland final for the first time in fifteen years, with a team that included such future stars as Cormac McAnallen, Stephen O'Neill, Ryan McMenamin. This victory was particularly note-worthy because of the death of Paul McGirr in a match against Armagh the previous year.

== 2000s ==
The 2000s have easily been the most successful period for Tyrone's footballers. The decade started with their second back-to-back All-Ireland Under-21 titles, this time captained by Cormac McAnallen. McAnallen became only the second person to do this, after Peter Canavan. Tyrone Minors also showed their mettle in 2001, with an All-Ireland-winning display, with Sean Cavanagh leading the march.

Eugene McKenna and Art McRory were reinstalled as managers in 2001, which also saw the Seniors capture their ninth Ulster Championship, with many of the Under-21 team crossing over to the Senior ranks, including Stephen O'Neill, who won his first (and Tyrone's only) All Star that year.

Tyrone won their first ever Senior All-Ireland in 2002, albeit the 'second tier' competition, the National Football League.

The introduction of the qualifying system allowed Tyrone to reach the All-Ireland quarter finals in 2002, where they were beaten by Sligo. Despite not playing in the Sligo match, Peter Canavan won his fourth All Star award, making him Tyrone's most prolific representative.

=== 2003 ===
2003 saw the introduction of the new Tyrone Manager, Mickey Harte. Harte had already Tyrone and Ulster titles with his club, Errigal Ciaran, and with Tyrone at Minor and Under 21 level, but had not proved himself on the inter-county stage at Senior level. Also, the acrimonious departure of Art McRory and Eugene McKenna, his predecessors, and two popular figures in Tyrone football over the previous twenty years, made many fans suspicious of his appointment. He soon laid those fears to rest however, immediately defending Tyrone's National League crown.

Tyrone then went on to win the Ulster Championship, beating Down in a replay, but with a massive margin of victory. After leaking four goals in the drawn match, Harte put Cormac McAnallen into the Full Back position, from his normal position in midfield. It turned out to be a wry move, Tyrone's ruthlessness in shooting at the posts, was now consolidated with a steadiness in defense.

In the All-Ireland Quarter-final (the next fixture), they met their spirited neighbors, Fermanagh. Tyrone ultimately proved much too strong for them however, and again won by a massive margin.

Their biggest test in the Championship came against Kerry in the semi-final. This was the first time Tyrone had met Kerry in the Championship since the All-Ireland Final in 1986. Many pundits believe this was Tyrone's definitive display of 2003. They deployed a 'blanket defense,' whereby as soon as they lost possession of the ball, all players were ready to win it back. Kerry players, from the full-back line to the forwards, found themselves harried by three or four players around them every time they got the ball, meaning they were under pressure for space, and time to release the ball. Detractors (famously, Pat Spillane, himself a Kerry player from the 1986 final) called this style 'puke football' because it stifled the flow of the game of Gaelic football. It was extremely effective however, and the 0–13 to 0–6 score line that Tyrone won by was flattering for Kerry.

The final was against Armagh, the reigning Champions, and neighboring rivals. This was the first time that two counties from Ulster had played in the All-Ireland Final, which was made possible by Armagh's progress through the 'back door' system. After an entertaining match, Tyrone emerged as All-Ireland Senior Football Championship winners for the first time in their history. It was an historic all northern final.

Peter Canavan's contribution to the game was marveled throughout the country. He started the match and was taken off before half time. During the break, and even some way into the second half, he was receiving treatment to his ankle, including having pain killing injections. Then, with seven minutes remaining, he was re-introduced by manager Mickey Harte, a shrewd, albeit necessary, move, considering Canavan was the only member of the team who had ever played in an All Ireland final before, in 1995.

Seven Tyrone players won All-Stars in 2003, Cormac McAnallen (which, along with his Young Player of the Year Award, would, tragically, turn out to be one of McAnallen's last honors as a Tyrone player – see below), Sean Cavanagh, Conor Gormley, Phillip Jordan, Brian Dooher, Brian McGuigan and Peter Canavan, winning his fifth All Star, added the Player of the Year Award to his haul. Canavan amassed a total of 1–48 (51 points) over the course of the Championship.

=== Death of Cormac McAnallen ===
After the 2003 success, Canavan relinquished his captaincy, and Mickey Harte appointed 24-year-old Cormac McAnallen to be the captain, because of his attitude, and leadership skills. McAnallen had led the Minors, and Under-21s to All-Ireland glory, and was widely expected to do the same with the Senior panel.

McAnallen died suddenly in his sleep on 2 March 2004, from an undetected heart condition. His untimely death deeply affected the Tyrone team and the world of Gaelic Games as a whole. Just weeks before his death, he had captained the Tyrone side that won the Dr. McKenna Cup after an overwhelming victory over Donegal at Ballybofey.

Brian Dooher was appointed captain after this tragedy, but Tyrone's focus was disrupted severely by McAnallen's death. They reached the quarter-final of the 2004 Championship, where they were beaten by Mayo. This only was Mickey Harte's second Championship defeat as manager, after losing to Donegal in the Ulster Championship.

Sean Cavanagh won his second All Star in a row in 2004.

The Tyrone Minor team won their sixth All-Ireland Final.

=== 2005 ===
Tyrone underwent a mammoth run to their second All-Ireland crown in 2005, playing in some of the finest games in recent GAA history. They played an unprecedented ten matches before finally picking up the Sam Maguire Cup.

Tyrone quickly dispatched Down in the first round, 1–13 to 1–6, before drawing against Cavan. However, in the replay the score line was intimidating, with Tyrone winning 3–19 (28 points) to 0–7. In the hugely entertaining drawn Ulster Final, Tyrone were four points ahead of rivals Armagh with barely three minutes remaining, and had been on top throughout the match. However, Armagh's deadly marksman, Steven McDonnell scored a goal, and Oisín McConville scored an equalizing point to send the match to a replay, on a score line of 0–14 for Tyrone, to Armagh's 2–8. Stephen O'Neill got the Man of the Match award, after scoring ten points.

The replayed match was as entertaining as its predecessor in the first half, but two rash sending off by the referee, of Peter Canavan (who had only came on the pitch as a substitute two minutes prior), and Stephen O'Neill (for a second yellow card) put Armagh in the driving seat. Armagh won the match by two points, 0–13 to 0–11.

Tyrone won their qualifying match against Monaghan with a ten-point margin (2–14 to 1–07), and played Dublin in the quarter-final. In the game, Tyrone and Dublin battled for a draw. The game is remembered for Owen Mulligan's solo-running goal (described by the television commentator as "one of the great goals we have seen at Croke Park") – effectively beating five Dublin players before hitting the net. The match ended 1–14 each.

In the replay, Tyrone emerged victorious, despite a battling effort from Dublin, 2–18 to 1–14.

Tyrone met Armagh for the third time in one championship. In a very stifled game, where both teams were effectively cancelling each other out, Tyrone had a free kick in injury time, which Peter Canavan opted to take. He scored, sending Tyrone to the All-Ireland Final against Kerry. The final score was 1–13 to 1–12

Tyrone defeated Kerry for the second time in three years to win the All-Ireland. Peter Canavan, in his swansong performance, scored Tyrone's winning goal. Canavan had been used mostly as an impact substitution through the latter stages of the Championship, but was started for the Final. The win sparked hugely emotional scenes among the Tyrone team and fans, in remembrance of Cormac McAnallen. Upon being handed the trophy, captain, Brian Dooher spoke of how he knew Cormac was with him.

Tyrone's All Star haul was one of the biggest of any All-Ireland winning team since the awards were introduced, with eight. Ryan McMenamin and Owen Mulligan both won their first, Conor Gormley, Phillip Jordan, Brian Dooher and Stephen O'Neill all won their second, with O'Neill also being awarded the player of the year award. Sean Cavanagh won his third All Star in a row, the first player to do since Peter Canavan in the nineties.

Tyrone exited the 2006 Football Championship after a poor display against Laois, on a wet Saturday night in O'Moore Park, Portlaoise. The Tyrone panel had been depleted by injury, with team captain Brian Dooher (shattered kneecap), inspirational play maker Brian McGuigan (broken leg) and midfielder Colin Holmes ruled out for the season, while other key players, including Stephen O'Neill, Gerard Cavlan and Conor Gormley, all missing most or all of the 2006 campaign due to injury.

=== 2007 ===
2007 was a modest modest for Tyrone. After a narrow one point win over Fermanagh in the first round of the Ulster Championship, Tyrone produced their best performance of the year, defeating National League Champions Donegal at St Tiernach's Park in Clones by 2–15 to 1–7. The highlight of this match was a 5-point haul by captain Brian Dooher in what was arguably his best performance in a Tyrone jersey. The final against Monaghan marked the first occasion since 2003 that Clones had hosted the Ulster Senior Football final, the 2004, 2005 and 2006 ffinals having been held at Croke Park in Dublin. The match itself was an up and down affair Tyrone raced into an early 1–5 to 0–1 lead their goal coming for left half back Phillip Jordan but Monaghan fought back to trail 1–8 to 0–7 at half time. The Second half began much like the first had, with Tyrone extending their lead to 1–13 to 0–8. A goal from Tomas Freeman sparked a Monaghan comeback, narrowing the gap to 1–13 to 1–10 before Sean Cavanagh at wing half forward put four points between the sides. A Monaghan free reduced the margin to a single score before Vincent Coreys's shot was saved by goalkeeper John Devine. Tyrone's Owen Mulligan then struck the post setting up a tense finish, but the final score remained 1–15 to 1–13 giving Tyrone their eleventh Ulster Title and 3rd since the turn of the Century. In the All-Ireland Quarter final Tyrone lost to a hungrier Meath side 1–13 Tyrone 2–8.

At Minor Level Tyrone claimed a 20th Ulster title but their opponents Derry can feel hard done by because one of Tyrones points was clearly wide, however the umpire signaled it as a score Tyrone won the game on a score line of 0–10 to 1–6

=== 2008 ===
The 2008 campaign was again plagued by injuries. Things then got worse as they relinquished their Ulster title to Down after a replay in which Down won by a point after 160 minutes. After two wins in the Football Qualifiers against Louth at Drogheda and Westmeath at Healy Park in Omagh, they faced Mayo in Round 3 in Croke Park for a place in the quarter-finals. Tyrone defeated Mayo 0–13 to 1–9, earning Tyrone a place in the quarter-finals (last 8) of the championship, where they faced Leinster champions Dublin in a repeat of the 2005 final clash. Tyrone made the brighter start to this game, and goals from Sean Cavanagh and Joe McMahon put Tyrone 2–5 to 1–3 up at the break. A third goal by David Harte in the second half ended the game as a contest, Tyrone winning 3–14 to 1–8. Tyrone then faced Wexford for a place in the senior football final but earlier in the day it was the Tyrone minors who booked their place in the final with a complete football performance, and eased past Meath on a score line of 1–21 to 2–7. They faced Mayo in the final. The seniors then always looked comfortable in their meeting with Wexford, and after racking up an 8-point lead at half-time they went through on a score of 0–23 to 1–14, to set up a 21 September date with All Ireland champions Kerry. In a thrilling All-Ireland Final Tyrone defeated Kerry 1–15 to 0–14 to win the Sam Maguire Cup for the third time. A week later the Tyrone Minor team defeated Mayo 1–20 to 1–15 in a replay to win the Thomas Markham Cup. Thus Tyrone became the first county since Kerry in 1980 to win All-Ireland Senior and Minor titles in the same year, and the first Ulster county ever to gain this achievement.

=== 2012 ===
Tyrone were defeated in Killarney by Kerry in the 2012 All-Ireland Championship.
