= 1995 All-Ireland Senior Football Championship final =

- Event: 1995 All-Ireland Senior Football Championship
Dublin	Tyrone
1–10 (13)	0–12 (12)
- Date: 17 September 1995
- Venue: Croke Park, Dublin
- Man of the Match: Paul Curran
- Referee: Paddy Russell (Tipperary)
- Attendance: 58,684
- Weather: Dry with sunny spells

The 1995 All-Ireland Senior Football Championship final was the 108th All-Ireland Final and the deciding match of the 1995 All-Ireland Senior Football Championship, an inter-county Gaelic football tournament for the top teams in Ireland.

This year's final was played on 17 September. It was the story of Charlie Redmond, the man who was sent off twice in the same All-Ireland final.

== Pre-game ==
Redmond sustained a groin injury while practising free-taking on the Thursday ahead of the match. Dublin manager Dr Pat O'Neill told Redmond (according to Redmond's own account) the day before the game: "We'll look after you, we'll give you an injection, we'll sort it out". Redmond said: "So in my head I was thinking I was going to have an injection that was going to sort me out. So 20 minutes before the game, I said, 'Okay, Pat, I'm ready to get the injection'. He says, 'I don't give injections'. I said, 'What are you talking about?' He says, 'Charlie, I have never given a player a pain-killing injection and I never will, if you can't play put your track-suit on. If you can play then get out and play'. He knew by telling me I'd get an injection that I'd relax from the Friday or Saturday".

== Match ==
=== Summary ===
Redmond opted to start the game in spite of his groin injury. He scored Dublin's goal late in the first half, further damaging his groin as he did so. Peter Canavan hit eleven of Tyrone's twelve points, but missed a late free that would have tied the game. The final is best remembered though for one incident early in the second half.

Redmond, the Dublin goal scorer, appeared to attempt a headbutt on Feargal Logan after Logan dropped his knee into Redmond's back while Redmond was on the ground. Referee Paddy Russell spoke to Redmond and Redmond did not leave the field. Play resumed and Redmond became involved in a further Dublin attack receiving the ball from Mick Deegan, Deegan having had it passed to him by Keith Barr. Redmond sent the ball a considerable distance, towards Dessie Farrell. Farrell then accidentally tripped Tyrone back Chris Lawn and the referee blew his whistle. Paul Clarke charged in and kicked Lawn while he was on the ground; Clarke had his name taken by the referee, this nearly two minutes after Redmond had been sent off. While this was occurring, Tony O'Donoghue provided an update from the sideline for RTÉ television viewers on the extent of Fergal Logan's "very bad" ankle injury. Finbar McConnell moved to take the free for Tyrone but was stopped short by a further blow from the referee's whistle. As the referee gently ambled towards standby referee Willie O'Mahony, the television commentator mentioned "a potential nightmare few minutes there for... uh... Dublin, and for Charlie Redmond in particular". O'Mahony exchanged words with the referee at the side of the field. The referee then headed in the direction of Redmond, shaking his head sternly, and began ushering Redmond from the field. The TV commentator said: "This is very confusing. I've never seen anything like this in an All-Ireland final. [Pause] I think he has sent him off! [Further pause] So Dublin are indeed down to fourteen players". The incident lasted more than three minutes, before Redmond left the field, shaking his head. Note that Seán Moran, writing in The Irish Times in 2019, noted that: "Watched on YouTube, the forbidden period on the field comes in at 28 seconds — admittedly that's nearly half a minute more than ideal, but not nearly the length of time some had thought, and during which Redmond never touched the ball".

=== Details ===
RTÉ

17 September 1995
15:30 IST (UTC+1)
Final

Dublin	1–10 (13) – 0–12 (12)	Tyrone
Gls: Charlie Redmond; Pts: Dessie Farrell 0–4, Paul Clarke 0–2, Charlie Redmond 0–1, Paul Curran 0–1, Keith Barr 0–1, Jim Gavin 0–1		Pts: Peter Canavan 0–11, Jody Gormley 0–1

Croke Park, Dublin
Referee: Paddy Russell
Attendance: 58,684

Dublin	Tyrone

GK	1	John O'Leary (c)
CB	2	Paddy Moran
FB	3	Ciarán Walsh
CB	4	Keith Galvin	Substituted off
WB	5	Paul Curran
HB	6	Keith Barr
WB	7	Mick Deegan
MF	8	Paul Bealin
MF	9	Brian Stynes
WF	10	Jim Gavin
HF	11	Paul Clarke
FW	12	Dessie Farrell	Substituted off
CF	13	Charlie Redmond
FF	14	Jason Sherlock
CF	15	Mick Galvin	Substituted off
Substitutes:
16	Davy Byrne
17	John O'Callaghan
18	Brian Barnes
19	Pat Gilroy	Substituted on
20	Vinnie Murphy	Substituted on
21	Robbie Boyle	Substituted on
22	Seán Cahill
23	Enda Sheehy
24	Brian Whelan
25	Shay Keogh
Manager:
Pat O'Neill

GK	1	Finbar McConnell
CB	2	Paul Devlin
FB	3	Chris Lawn
CB	4	Fay Devlin
WB	5	Ronan McGarrihy
HB	6	Seamus McCallan
WB	7	Sean McLaughlin	Substituted off
MF	8	Feargal Logan
MF	9	Jody Gormley
WF	10	Ciaran Corr (c)
HF	11	Pascal Canavan
WF	12	Ciarán Loughran	Substituted off
CF	13	Ciarán McBride
FF	14	Peter Canavan
CF	15	Stephen Lawn	Substituted off
Substitutes:
16	Joe Cassidy
17	Damian Loughran
18	Paul Donnelly	Substituted on
19	Mattie McGleenan	Substituted on
20	Adrian Cush
21	Gerard Cavlan
22	Danny Barr
23	Damian Gormley
24	Brian Gormley (substituted on)
25	Brendan Mallon
Managers:
Art McRory & Eugene McKenna

Man of the Match:
Paul Curran (Dublin)

== Post-match ==
Redmond joked afterwards that he thought Russell was "waving to his family".

The incident prompted the GAA to introduce red and yellow cards.

Many years later, Redmond encountered Russell at a function. Redmond said Russell remembered it better than he did. "I apparently said, 'Paddy, you are making a huge mistake and you will be able to see it tonight on television' and he said, 'Well, that's a mistake I'm willing to make'".

Redmond is teased by children who he says were unborn at the time of the incident.

Peter Canavan was named Footballer of the Year.

Tyrone would not appear in another All-Ireland final until 2003.

Dublin would not appear in another All-Ireland final until 2011.

This was Dublin's last All-Ireland Senior Football Championship title until they won the 2011 final.

The two teams did not meet again in an All-Ireland final until 2018 won by Dublin.
