= 1995 All-Ireland Senior Football Championship =

Football championship

Championship details
- Dates: 21 May 1995 – 17 September 1995
- Teams: 32

All-Ireland Champions
- Winning team: Dublin (22nd win)
- Captain: John O'Leary
- Manager: Pat O'Neill

All-Ireland Finalists
- Losing team: Tyrone
- Captain: Ciarán Corr
- Manager: Art McRory; Eugene McKenna

Provincial Champions
- Munster: Cork
- Leinster: Dublin
- Ulster: Tyrone
- Connacht: Galway

Championship statistics
- No. matches played: 33
- Top Scorer: Peter Canavan (1–38)
- Player of the Year: Paul Curran; Peter Canavan

The 1995 Bank of Ireland All-Ireland Senior Football Championship was the 109th staging of the All-Ireland Senior Football Championship, the Gaelic Athletic Association's premier inter-county Gaelic football tournament. The championship began on 21 May 1995 and ended on 17 September 1995.

Down entered the championship as the defending champions, however, they were defeated by Donegal in the Ulster preliminary round.

On 17 September 1995, Dublin won the championship following a 1–10 to 0–12 defeat of Tyrone in the All-Ireland final. This was their 22nd All-Ireland title and their first in twelve championship seasons.

Tyrone's Peter Canavan was the championship's top scorer with 1–38. Dublin's Paul Clarke was the choice for Texaco Footballer of the Year, while Tyrone's Peter Canavan was selected as the Powerscreen Footballer of the Year.

== Provincial championships ==
=== Connacht Senior Football Championship ===
Quarter-finals

28 May 1995 Quarter-final	Sligo	0–11 – 0–11	Galway	Markievicz Park, Sligo
	D McGoldrick 0–3, E O'Hara 0–2, P Seavers 0–2, B Mulhern 0–1, P Taylor 0–1, K Killeen 0–1, F Feeney 0–1		N Finnegan 0–6, J Fallon 0–2, T Wilson 0–1, A Leonard 0–1, B Duffy 0–1	Attendance: 4,000; Referee: S McHale (Mayo)

4 June 1995 Quarter-final replay	Galway	1–12 – 0–8	Sligo	Tuam Stadium, Tuam
	B Duffy 1–0, J Fallon 0–3, K Walsh 0–2, N Finnegan 0–2, F Gavin 0–2, D Mitchell 0–1, T Wilson 0–1, V Daly 0–1		D McGoldrick 0–2, K Killeen 0–2, K Kearins 0–2, P Taylor 0–1, P Seavers 0–1	Attendance: 6,000; Referee: S McHale (Mayo)

4 June 1995 Quarter-final	London	1–7 – 0–19	Roscommon	Emerald GAA Grounds, Ruislip
	P O'Neill 1–0, E Prenter 0–2, B McDonagh 0–1, N Magee 0–1, M Thynne 0–1, T Maguire 0–1, K Blayney 0–1		D Duggan 0–5, L Dolan 0–4, V Glennon 0–3, T Grehan 0–3, L Down 0–2, C Connolly 0–2	Attendance: 2,000; Referee: S Prior (Leitrim)

Semi-finals

11 June 1995 Semi-final	Leitrim	0–11 – 0–12	Galway	Páirc Sheáin Mhic Dhiarmada, Carrick-on-Shannon
	C McGlynn 0–4, P McLoughlin 0–2, C McGovern 0–1, D Darcy 0–1, B Breen 0–1, P Kieran 0–1, L Conlon 0–1		J Fallon 0–4, N Finnegan 0–3, S Óg de Paor 0–2, V Daly 0–2, T Wilson 0–1	Attendance: 4,000; Referee: P Casserley (Westmeath)

25 June 1995 Semi-final	Mayo	2–11 – 1–10	Roscommon	McHale Park, Castlebar
	T Corcoran 1–0, J Casey 1–0, P Brogan 0–2, R Dempsey 0–2, P Cunney 0–2, C McManamon 0–2, P Butler 0–1, P Fallon 0–1, K O'Neill 0–1		L Dolan 0–5, T Grehan 1–0, F O'Donnell 0–3, J Newton 0–1, D Duggan 0–1	Attendance: 10,000; Referee: M Curley (Galway)

Final

23 July 1995 Final	Galway	0–17 – 1–7	Mayo	Tuam Stadium, Tuam
	V Daly 0–5, N Finnegan 0–4, T Wilson 0–3, F O'Neill 0–2, S Óg de Paor 0–1, F Gavin 0–1, K Walsh 0–1		R Dempsey 1–1, P Brogan 0–2, K O'Neill 0–1, P Cunney 0–1, C McManamon 0–1, K Mortimer 0–1	Attendance: 17,000; Referee: F Finan (Sligo)

=== Leinster Senior Football Championship ===
Preliminary round

21 May 1995 Preliminary round	Wexford	1–3 – 0–13	Westmeath	Wexford Park, Wexford
	S Doran 1–1, J Hegarty 0–1, J Lawlor 0–1		G Heavin 0–6, L Giles 0–2, J Fleming 0–2, R O'Connell 0–1, A Collins 0–1, J Healy 0–1	Attendance: 5,000; Referee: T Howard (Kildare)

28 May 1995 Preliminary round	Kildare	0–11 – 0–13	Louth	St. Conleth's Park, Newbridge
	N Buckley 0–4, D O'Connell 0–3, S McGovern 0–1, S Dowling 0–1, D Kerrigan 0–1, P McCormack 0–1		C Kelly 0–7, A Doherty 0–2, O McDonnell 0–2, B Kearns 0–1, S White 0–1	Referee: P Casserly (Westmeath)

28 May 1995 Preliminary round	Meath	1–15 – 1–5	Offaly	Páirc Tailteann, Navan
	C O'Rourke 1–2, E Kelly 0–5, T Dowd 0–3, B Reilly 0–2, PJ Gillic 0–1, T Giles 0–1, B Stafford 0–1		P Daly 0–4, M Casey 1–0, R Mooney 0–1	Attendance: 18,000; Referee: P O'Toole (Longford)

Quarter-finals

11 June 1995 Quarter-final	Westmeath	0–3 – 0–9	Wicklow	Páirc Ciarán, Athlone
	G Heavin 0–2, M Fagan 0–1		C Daye 0–6, K O'Brien 0–2, J Clancy 0–1	Attendance: 6,000; Referee: P McEneaney (Monaghan)

11 June 1995 Quarter-final	Longford	0–10 – 4–15	Meath	Pearse Park, Longford
	M O'Brien 0–5, JJ Reilly 0–3, D Barry 0–2		E Kelly 2–0, B Stafford 1–3, C O'Rourke 1–2, T Dowd 0–3, J Devine 0–2, O Murphy 0–1, G Geraghty 0–1, B Reilly 0–1, PJ Gillic 0–1, T Giles 0–1	Referee: M Curley (Galway)

18 June 1995 Quarter-final	Dublin	0–19 – 2–5	Louth	Páirc Tailteann, Navan
	C Redmond 0–9, P Clarke 0–2, M Gavin 0–2, K Galvin 0–1, P Bealin 0–1, B Stynes 0–1, D Farrell 0–1, V Murphy 0–1, J Sherlock 0–1		S White 1–1, C Kelly 0–4, C O'Hanlon 1–0	Referee: B White (Wexford)

18 June 1995 Quarter-final	Laois	2–10 – 1–13	Carlow	O'Moore Park, Portlaoise
	D Delaney 2–5, M O'Brien 0–2, L Turley 0–1, H Emerson 0–1, T Maher 0–1		A Keating 1–2, J Hayden 0–3, M Doyle 0–2, J Nevin 0–2, S Kavanagh 0–2, G Ware 0–1, W Quinlan 0–1	Attendance: 10,000; Referee: N Cooney (Offaly)

25 June 1995 Quarter-final replay	Laois	1–16 – 0–15	Carlow	O'Moore Park, Portlaoise
	M Lawlor 1–4, D Delaney 0–6, G Doyle 0–2, L Turley 0–2, T Bowe 0–1, D Connell 0–1		A Keating 0–6, J Hayden 0–3, J Nevin 0–2, S Kavanagh 0–1, G Ware 0–1, N Doyle 0–1, J Morrissey 0–1	Attendance: 12,000; Referee: P O'Toole (Longford)

Semi-finals

2 July 1995 Semi-final	Meath	3–14 – 0–9	Wicklow	O'Moore Park, Portlaoise
	B Stafford 1–5, T Dowd 1–3, C O'Rourke 1–2, E Kelly 0–2, J Devine 0–1, T Giles 0–1		C Daye 0–6, K O'Brien 0–1, P Allen 0–1, M Murtagh 0–1	Attendance: 12,000; Referee: T Howard (Kildare)

9 July 1995 Semi-final	Dublin	1–13 – 0–9	Laois	Páirc Tailteann, Navan
	C Redmond 0–7, J Sherlock 1–0, P Clarke 0–3, M Deegan 0–1, D Farrell 0–1, V Murphy 0–1		D Delaney 0–6, M Lawlor 0–3	Referee: B White (Wexford)

Final

30 July 1995 Final	Dublin	1–18 – 1–8	Meath	Croke Park, Dublin
	C Redmond 0–7, P Clarke 1–2, D Farrell 0–3, P Curran 0–2, J Sherlock 0–2, M Galvin 0–1, J Gavin 0–1		E Kelly 1–0, T Giles 0–3, C O'Rourke 0–2, J Devine 0–1, G Geraghty 0–1, B Stafford 0–1	Attendance: 63,000; Referee: P Casserly (Westmeath)

=== Munster Senior Football Championship ===
Quarter-finals

28 May 1995 Quarter-final	Cork	0–23 – 0–9	Waterford	Páirc Uí Chaoimh, Cork
	C Corkery 0–12, C O'Sullivan 0–3, S Calnan 0–3, L Honohan 0–2, J Kavanagh 0–2, P O'Mahony 0–1		B Arrigan 0–6, R Power 0–1, P Ferncombe 0–1, K Whelan 0–1	Attendance: 2,615; Referee: M Ó Súilleabháin (Kerry)

28 May 1995 Quarter-final	Limerick	0–8 – 3–17	Kerry	Gaelic Grounds, Limerick
	T Cummins 0–2, T Fitzgerald 0–2, C McGill 0–2, D Fitzgibbon 0–1, J Power 0–1		M Fitzgerald 2–10, D Ahearn 1–1, D Ó Cinnéide 0–2, D O'Shea 0–1, B O'Shea 0–1, B O'Driscoll 0–1, J Crowley 0–1	Attendance: 5,000; Referee: S O'Keeffe (Cork)

Semi-finals

25 June 1995 Semi-final	Cork	0–17 – 0–11	Clare	Páirc Uí Chaoimh, Cork
	C Corkery 0–11, P O'Mahony 0–2, S O'Brien 0–1, J Kavanagh 0–1, S Calanan 0–1, M O'Sullivan 0–1		G Keane 0–5, F McInerney 0–3, O O'Dwyer 0–1, M Hynes 0–1, M Daly 0–1	Attendance: 10,423

25 June 1995 Semi-final	Kerry	7–12 – 1–13	Tipperary	Austin Stack Park, Tralee
	M Fitzgerald 2–6, S Crowley 2–1, L Hassett 1–2, B Driscoll 1–0. D Ó Cinnéide 1–0, E Breen 0–2 G Farrell 0–1		B Cummins 0–7, B Lambert 0–5, P Maguire 1–0, M Sheehan 0–1	Referee: K Walsh (Clare)

Final

23 July 1995 Final	Kerry	1–9 – 0–15	Cork	Fitzgerald Stadium, Killarney
	M Fitzgerald 0–4, E Breen 1–0, G Farrell 0–2, M Hassett 0–1, B Driscoll 0–1, P Dennehy 0–1		C Corkery 0–7, D Davis 0–3, C O'Sullivan 0–2, N Cahalane 0–1, J Kavanagh 0–1, M O'Sullivan 0–1	Attendance: 42,735; Referee: P Russell (Tipperary)

=== Ulster Senior Football Championship ===
Preliminary round

21 May 1995 Preliminary round	Donegal	1–12 – 0–9	Down	St. Tiernach's Park, Clones
	M Boyle 1–5, P Hegarty 0–2, M Gavigan 0–1, B Murray 0–1, J McHugh 0–1, J Duffy 0–1, T Boyle 0–1		R Carr 0–3, G McCartan 0–3, A Farrell 0–1, M Linden 0–1, G Mason 0–1	Attendance: 26,000; Referee: P McEneaneny (Monaghan)

Quarter-finals

28 May 1995 Quarter-final	Armagh	0–10 – 1–17	Derry	Athletic Grounds, Armagh
	C O'Rourke 0–7, M McQuillan 0–1, D Marsden 0–1, D Mackin 0–1		E Gormley 0–4, H Downey 1–0, A Tohill 0–2, D Barton 0–2, D Bateson 0–2, S Downey 0–2, D Cassidy 0–1, G McGill 0–1, J McGurk 0–1, B McGilligan 0–1, D Heaney 0–1	Attendance: 14,000; Referee: T McDermott (Cavan)

4 June 1995 Quarter-final	Fermanagh	1–11 – 1–15	Tyrone	St. Molaise Park, Irvinestown
	S King 0–7, C McCreash 1–1, M Gallagher 0–1, M O'Rourke 0–1, P Coyle 0–1		Peter Canavan 0–7, S Lawn 1–0, Pascal Canavan 0–3, M McGleenan 0–2, F Logan 0–1, J Gormley 0–1, S McCallan 0–1	Attendance: 15,000; Referee: M McGrath (Donegal)

11 June 1995 Quarter-final	Cavan	2–11 – 0–8	Antrim	Breffni Park, Cavan
	R Carolan 0–7, P Reilly 2–0, A Lambe 0–2, D McCabe 0–1, J Brady 0–1		J Kennedy 0–4, C Heatley 0–2, A Finnegan 0–1, P McErlean 0–1	Referee: B White (Wexford)

18 June 1995 Quarter-final	Donegal	0–8 – 1–14	Monaghan	MacCumhaill Park, Ballybofey
	M Boyle 0–4, N Hegarty 0–1, M Gavigan 0–1, B Murray 0–1, D Bonner 0–1		D Smyth 0–6, D Loughman 1–0, P Duffy 0–3, P McShane 0–2, S McGinnity 0–2, J Conlon 0–1	Referee: J Curran (County Tyrone)

Semi-finals

25 June 1995 Semi-final	Tyrone	0–11 – 0–10	Derry	St. Tiernach's Park, Clones
	Peter Cafnavan 0–8, S McLoughlin 0–1, J Gormley 0–1, C Corr 0–1		A Tohill 0–5, E Gormley 0–4, E Burns 0–1	Referee: T McDermott (Cavan)

2 July 1995 Semi-final	Cavan	1–9 – 0–10	Monaghan	St. Tiernach's Park, Clones
	F Cahill 1–3, R Carolan 0–2, P Reilly 0–2, D McCabe 0–1, A Lambe 0–1		P Duffy 0–4, D Smyth 0–3, F McEneaney 0–1, Michael Slowey 0–1, D Loughman 0–1	Referee: M McGrath (Donegal)

Final

23 July 1995 Final	Tyrone	2–13 – 0–10	Cavan	St. Tiernach's Park, Clones
	Peter Canavan 0–5, A Cush 1–0, M McGleenan 1–0, C McBride 0–2, S Lawn 0–2, S McCallan 0–1, S McLoughlin 0–1, C Corr 0–1, C Loughran 0–1		P Reilly 0–5, R Carolan 0–2, D McCabe 0–2, T Smyth 0–1	Referee: P McEneaney (Monaghan)

== All-Ireland Senior Football Championship ==
Semi-finals

13 August 1995 Semi-final	Tyrone	1–13 – 0–13	Galway	Croke Park, Dublin
	P Canavan 1–7, M McGleenan 0–2, A Cush 0–1, S McLaughlin 0–1, F Logan 0–1, C McBride 0–1		N Finnegan 0–7, J Fallon 0–2, V Daly 0–1, R Silke 0–1, F Gavin 0–1, T Wilson 0–1	Attendance: 37,053; Referee: B White (Wexford)

20 August 1995 Semi-final	Dublin	1–12 – 0–12	Cork	Croke Park, Dublin
	C Redmond 0–7, M Galvin 0–4, J Sherlock 1–0, P Clarke 0–1		C Corkery 0–6, M O'Sullivan 0–3, L Tompkins 0–2, J Kavanagh 0–1	Attendance: 52,606; Referee: P McEneaney (Monaghan)

Final

17 September 1995 Final	Dublin	1–10 – 0–12	Tyrone	Croke Park, Dublin
	C Redmond 1–1, D Farrell 0–4, P Clarke 0–2, P Curran 0–1, K Barr 0–1, J Gavin 0–1		Peter Canavan 0–11, J Gormley 0–1	Attendance: 58,684; Referee: P Russell (Tipperary)

== Championship statistics ==
=== Top scorers ===
Overall

Rank	Player	County	Tally	Total	Matches	Average
1	Peter Canavan	Tyrone	1–38	41	5	8.20
2	Colin Corkery	Cork	0–36	36	4	9.00
3	Charlie Redmond	Dublin	1–31	34	5	6.80
4	Maurice Fitzgerald	Kerry	4–20	32	3	10.66
5	Damien Delaney	Cork	2–17	23	3	7.66
6	Niall Finnegan	Galway	0–22	22	5	4.40
7	Colm O'Rourke	Meath	3–8	17	4	4.25
8	Evan Kelly	Meath	3–7	16	4	4.00
8	Brian Stafford	Meath	2–10	16	4	4.00
10	Peter Reilly	Cavan	2–7	13	3	4.33
10	Paul Clarke	Dublin	1–10	13	5	2.60

Single game

Rank	Player	County	Tally	Total	Opposition
1	Maurice Fitzgerald	Kerry	2–10	16	Limerick
2	Colin Corkery	Cork	0–12	12	Waterford
2	Maurice Fitzgerald	Kerry	2–6	12	Tipperary
4	Damien Delaney	Laois	2–5	11	Carlow
4	Colin Corkery	Cork	0–11	11	Clare
4	Peter Canavan	Tyrone	0–11	11	Dublin
7	Peter Canavan	Tyrone	1–7	10	Galway
8	Charlie Redmond	Dublin	0–9	9	Louth
9	Brian Stafford	Meath	1–5	8	Wicklow
9	Manus Boyle	Donegal	1–5	8	Down
9	Peter Canavan	Tyrone	0–8	8	Derry

=== Miscellaneous ===
- The Leinster quarter-final between Laois and Carlow ends in disarray and confusion over the score. A late Mick Turley point which gave Laois the lead was later deemed to have been a wide. At a subsequent meeting the Leinster Council voted to adopt the referee's report in spite of television replays showing that the ball had gone wide. Laois offered Carlow a replay of the match, which they subsequently won by four points.
- Only year (1987–2025) neither Leinster semi-final was played at Croke Park.
- Cork being Munster champions for the third year in a row won their seventh Munster title in nine years.
