= Malachy O'Rourke =

Gaelic footballer and manager

Personal information
- Native name: Ó Ruairc (Irish)
- Occupation: Schoolteacher

Sport
- Sport: Football
Clubs
- Years: Club
- Derrylin; Errigal Ciarán
College
- Years: College
- c. 1989: St Mary's
College titles
- Sigerson titles: 1
Inter-county
- Years: County
- Fermanagh

Malachy O'Rourke
Sport
Club management
- Years: Club
- c. 2001 c. 2003 c. 2006 2007 2020–2025: Tyholland; The Loup; Errigal Ciarán; Cavan Gaels; Glen
- 1
Inter-county management
- Years: Team
- 2007–2010 2012–2019 2024–: Fermanagh; Monaghan; Tyrone

Malachy O'Rourke is a Gaelic football manager and former player for the Fermanagh county team. He has been manager of the senior Tyrone county team since 2024.

He previously managed Fermanagh and Monaghan.

== Career ==
He played for Fermanagh for more than ten years, but was only on the winning side twice in that period in the championship (both time against Antrim).

When he was studying to be a physical education teacher at St Mary's University College, Belfast, O'Rourke played on the St Mary's team that won the 1989 Sigerson Cup along with people like Jarlath Burns, Pascal Canavan, Seamus Downey, Danny Quinn and Benny Tierney. His thesis was on the VO_{2} max of Gaelic footballers.

He left his club Derrylin in the early 1990s and got a transfer to Errigal Ciarán because he had moved to Ballygawley, County Tyrone, on account of him teaching at St Joseph's, Enniskillen, and his wife teaching in Derrylatinee Eglish, so Ballygawley in South Tyrone worked for the pair of them. He got himself settled with Errigal Ciarán and won two championships.

He began his coaching career with Tyholland in 2001 and got them promoted to the senior grade for the first time in his first season. Two years after that he took The Loup job and won them their first Senior Championship in 68 years, followed up by a first ever Ulster title. Errigal Ciarán approached him to take over as manager in 2006 and he won a Senior Championship with them. Then he moved to Cavan Gaels, and won a Cavan Senior championship in 2007.

O'Rourke succeeded Charlie Mulgrew as Fermanagh senior manager in October 2007. His first season featured a first appearance in the Ulster SFC final for 26 years, losing eventually to Armagh in a replay. It was only Fermanagh's second appearance in the final of the competition in 63 years, knocking out Monaghan and Derry along the way. His time as Fermanagh manager ended in 2010, after Fermanagh were relegated to Division 4 of the National Football League and a heavy defeat to Monaghan in the 2010 Ulster SFC semi-final.

O'Rourke took the Monaghan job in 2013, and won a first Ulster Senior title for 25 years. He took Monaghan from Division 3 to Division 1 in successive seasons. Under his stewardship, he led Monaghan to a first win over Kerry in 27 years during the 2015 National League. They also lost narrowly against Dublin in the same year's League semi-final. They reached the Ulster final in the next two seasons, which was three final appearances in a row, the first time in 92 years for Monaghan. He managed the county to four All Ireland Senior quarter finals and took them to the 2018 All Ireland Senior semi final, only losing by a point to Tyrone before he left in June 2019.

He was appointed manager of the men's Senior football team at Watty Graham's GAC, Glen, a club near Maghera in Derry, in October 2020; this was his first job since he left Monaghan in June 2019. With Glen, he won three Derry Senior Football Championships in a row 2021, 2022 and 2023, their first ever county titles. In 2022 and 2023, he led them to the Ulster Club Championship titles and in 2024 the All Ireland Club Championship title.

O'Rourke was linked with the Meath job when Andy McEntee left the post in June 2022.

On 10 September 2024, he was announced as Tyrone manager. This meant he departed his role on the Football Review Committee.

Sporting positions
Preceded by Charlie Mulgrew	Fermanagh Senior Football Manager; 2007–2010	Succeeded by Peter Canavany
Preceded by Eamonn McEneaney	Monaghan Senior Football Manager; 2012–2019	Succeeded by Séamus McEnaney
Preceded by Brian Dooher & Feargal Logan	Tyrone Senior Football Manager; 2024–	Succeeded by Incumbent
Achievements
Preceded by Robbie Brennan (Kilmacud Crokes)	All-Ireland Club SFC winning manager 2024	Succeeded by Austin O'Malley (Cuala)
