= Clann na nGael GAA =

Clann na nGael GAA may refer to:

- Clann na nGael GAA (Cork), a sports club in Ireland
- Clann na nGael GAA (Meath), a sports club in Ireland
- Clann na nGael GAA (Roscommon), a sports club in Ireland
- Clann na nGael GAA (Tyrone), a sports club
