= Clan na Gael (disambiguation) =

The Clan na Gael was an Irish republican organization in the United States.

Clan na Gael may also refer to:

- Clan na Gael GAA (Armagh), a Gaelic Athletic Association club in Armagh
- Clann na nGael GAA (Cork), a Gaelic Athletic Association club in Cork
- Clan Na Gael GFC (Louth), a GAA club in Dundalk, County Louth
- Clann na nGael GAA (Meath), a Gaelic Athletic Association club in Meath
- Clann na nGael GAA (Roscommon), a Gaelic Athletic Association club in Roscommon
- Clann na nGael GAA (Tyrone), a Gaelic Athletic Association club in Tyrone
- Seven Nations (band), a band formally called Clan na Gael
