= Ryan McMenamin =

Irish Gaelic footballer

Personal information
- Native name: Rian Mac Meanmán (Irish)
- Nickname: Ricey
- Born: Canada
- Occupation: Civil Servant
- Height: 1.78 m (5 ft 10 in)

Sport
- Sport: Gaelic football
- Position: Corner Back
Club
- Years: Club
- Dromore St Dympna's
Club titles
- Tyrone titles: 3
Inter-county
Years	County	Apps (scores)
	Tyrone	42
Inter-county titles
- Ulster titles: 5
- All-Irelands: 3
- NFL: 2
- All Stars: 1

Ryan 'Ricey' McMenamin is a Canadian-born Irish Gaelic football manager and former player who formerly managed the Fermanagh county team. He played for the Tyrone county team, winning three All-Ireland Senior Football Championship medals, two Ulster Championships and two National League titles. Forging a reputation for being a bit of a bad boy during his career, he was awarded an All Star for his performances in 2005.

McMenamin played his club football for St Dympna's Dromore and won two Tyrone Senior Football Championships with the club.

Despite normally starting at corner back for his county, he was not a traditional corner back, often running with the ball up the pitch, and getting himself into scoring positions. However, his marking is among the best in the country, and often marks the opposition's leading scorers. He also played at centre half back for his club.

== Playing career ==
=== Club ===
McMenamin helped Dromore win the Tyrone Senior Football Championship in 2007, beating Coalisland in the final. Dromore also reached the following year's final, but were defeated by Clonoe. In 2009 he once again helped Dromore win the Tyrone Senior Football Championship in dramatic style against Ardboe.

=== Inter-county ===
In 2003 McMenamin helped Tyrone win the county's first ever All-Ireland Senior Football Championship. Two years later he won a second All-Ireland medal with Tyrone, and received an All Star award for his performances that year. In 2006, he captained the much-depleted side due to injury to the captain, Brian Dooher. The side were knocked out of the Championship by Laois in July. In 2008, he won a third All-Ireland with Tyrone. In the winter of 2012, McMenamin retired from Inter-county football and is no longer with the Tyrone senior setup.

=== International rules ===
McMenamin represented Ireland in the International Rules Series.

== Disciplinary problems ==
Discipline was an underlying problem in McMenamin's career, which at times threatened to overshadow his achievements. This indiscipline was apparent throughout his career, and he made a name for his verbal taunting of his direct opponents during matches as well, which was mentioned by Oisín McConville in his autobiography.

His 2005 achievements were blotted somewhat by his disciplinary record. He was given a yellow card late on in the replayed Ulster Championship, for dropping his knee onto a fallen player. This was upgraded to a sending off after the game, which meant that McMenamin would be suspended for the following four weeks, but Tyrone launched an appeal, employing the services of former player, and practising solicitor, Feargal Logan. The appeal was successful but only after McMenamin missed the All-Ireland qualifier against Monaghan.

In the opening game of the 2007 Ulster Senior Football Championship, despite being one of the few first choice panellists available on the injury-hit side, he was substituted just before half time because he had already picked up a yellow card and a ticking—meaning he was one bad tackle away from being sent off. He was visibly upset when he was shown coming off the field.

As a result of his behaviour in a league match against Kerry on Sunday 15 February, where he was seen to grab Paul Galvin in the groin area, he was banned for eight weeks. Initially the ban was for six weeks, but due to the nature of McMenamin's behaviour the ban was raised to eight weeks, when the Tyrone County Board appealed the initial six-week ban. In addition to the incident with Paul Galvin for which he received the ban, McMenamim was involved in a number of unsavoury incidents throughout the match, which led to intense criticism in the media.

== Managerial career ==
McMenamin took over as Fermanagh senior manager in August 2019, having previously spent two years serving in the background. His time in charge was affected by the COVID-19 pandemic. He departed as Fermanagh senior manager in August 2021. He joined the Cavan management team in late 2021.

== Personal life ==
McMenamin is a supporter of Charlton Athletic.
