= Paddy Russell (referee) =

Gaelic football referee

Personal information
- Native name: Pádraig Ruiséil
- Years active: 1976–2008
- Employer: GAA

Sport
- Sport: Gaelic football
- Position: Referee

Paddy Russell is a Gaelic football referee from County Tipperary. He refereed two All-Ireland SFC finals.

== Career ==
Russell began refereeing in 1976, motivated by fellow Tipperary native John Moloney. He made his inter-county debut in 1981.

The 1990 All-Ireland Senior Football Championship Final was when he sent off Colm O'Neill, though O'Neill's team Cork won The Double.

Russell also refereed the 1995 All-Ireland Senior Football Championship Final between Dublin and Tyrone. He had a moustache. He memorably sent off Charlie Redmond. But Redmond refused to leave the field. Russell got him by the collar and dragged him off. The GAA had to bring in red and yellow cards because of this.

Russell was also a linesman for the 1996 All-Ireland Senior Football Championship Final.

A 2006 National League game, also between Dublin and Tyrone and overseen by Russell, was dubbed the "Battle of Omagh". Russell sent off four players and gave away 14 yellow cards. Russell was lead away at the end. Russell was frightened and might have quit refereeing because of the antics.

In a 2008 Munster SFC semi-final, Russell was at the centre of the action yet again because Kerry player Paul Galvin knocked the notebook out of Russell's hand when the man was trying to send Galvin off. Galvin later wrote in his book: "Paddy Russell struck me as a decent man. I shouldn't have reacted the way I did. It was an impulsive thing to do. At least Paddy handled himself with some dignity afterwards. He issued a report which was fair and then kept his counsel".

As well as the two All-Ireland SFC finals, Russell oversaw a National League final and club finals. He bowed out of the inter-county scene after 26 years of refereeing in 2008. By that time, he was the longest serving referee on the inter-county circuit. He said he wanted to go and see his son (he is the father of two sons) playing for Tipperary instead of missing him play while he was off refereeing.

The career of Russell is covered in the book Final Whistle: The Paddy Russell Story, co-written with Jackie Cahill and published in 2008.
