= Seán Cavanagh =

Irish Gaelic footballer (born 1983)

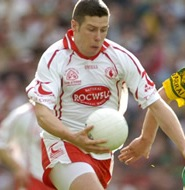
- Seán Cavanagh

Personal information
- Native name: Seán Ó Caomhánach (Irish)
- Born: 16 February 1983 (age 43) Omagh, Northern Ireland
- Occupations: Director, Sean Cavanagh & Co
- Height: 1.88 m (6 ft 2 in)

Sport
- Sport: Gaelic football
- Position: Midfield/Full-Forward
Club
- Years: Club
- 2000–: Moy Tír Na nÓg
Inter-county
- Years: County
- 2002–2017: Tyrone
Inter-county titles
- Ulster titles: 6
- All-Irelands: 3
- NFL: 2
- All Stars: 5

Seán Cavanagh (born 16 February 1983) is an Irish former Gaelic footballer who played for the Moy Tír Na nÓg club and for the Tyrone county team. He is a five-time All Star winner. He won All-Ireland Championships for Tyrone at minor level and three times at senior level, and captained Ireland in the International Rules Series.

His playing style was very attack-minded, considering he is usually deployed as a midfielder, and he usually ended up scoring more than most of the forwards on the team. This was complemented on the team by Brian Dooher's tireless workrate from the half-forward line – something he is the first to admit. In 2008, he won his third All-Ireland Senior Football Championship, captained Ireland to victory in the International Rules Series, and won his fourth All Star award and the Player of the Year award.

Upon retiring, Cavanagh held the all-time outfield appearances record in championship football, with 89 appearances for his county. He also made a record number of appearances for his county.

His brother Colm has also played for Tyrone.

== Background ==
Cavanagh graduated from the University of Ulster in 2004 with a First Class Honours Degree in accountancy. He has since gone on to follow a career in accountancy.

== Playing career ==
=== Under-age ===
Cavanagh was an integral part of the Tyrone Minor Team that won the All-Ireland Minor Championship in 2001. He also won two Ulster Minor Championships with the county. He went on to win two Ulster Under 21 Championships in 2002 and 2003.

At school level, he won the Ulster Colleges Championship, the MacRory Cup in 2000, with Saint Patrick's Grammar School, Armagh, and was named an Ulster Colleges All Star after scoring the decisive goal in the final.

=== Senior ===
Cavanagh made his Tyrone Senior debut in 2002, against neighbouring rivals, and eventual All Ireland Champions, Armagh scoring a goal which earned Tyrone a replay. He was also a member of the squad that won Tyrone's first ever National League title.

Tyrone defended the National League in 2003. That year he was pivotal in Tyrone's quest to their first ever All-Ireland Championship. He was voted Man-of-the-Match in their first round replay against Derry. He returned from injury to appear in the drawn Ulster Final against Down, and scored a point in the replay while commanding midfield. In the All-Ireland Quarter final (the next round), Tyrone beat neighbours Fermanagh 1–21 (24 points) to 0–05. Cavanagh again led by example from midfield, and scored Tyrone's goal. Tyrone went on to win the All-Ireland and the year ended with Cavanagh winning his first All Star, at the age of twenty, as well as the Young Player of the Year Award.

Tyrone's 2004 campaign was foreshadowed by the untimely death of their newly appointed captain, Cormac McAnallen. Tyrone were ultimately knocked out of the Championship by eventual finalists, Mayo. Cavanagh won Tyrone's only All Star that year.

In 2005, Cavanagh scored twelve points from midfield over the course of the championship. There was speculation as to whether he would emigrate to Australia to join a professional AFL team, (Brisbane Lions), as Tadhg Kennelly had successfully done a few years prior. However, he declined offers of a contract with Brisbane Lions, saying that he wanted to stay in Ireland and further both his football career and his career as an accountant. He claims that when he travelled to play Australia in 2005, he saw that Australia was a "great" place, but not somewhere he would be happy to settle.

In the All-Ireland Semi-final, with Tyrone two points down in the final minutes against Armagh, Cavanagh scored a point from a solo run to help Tyrone win the match.
Cavanagh was again awarded an All-Star, his third in a row – the only Ulsterman to do that apart from Peter Canavan in the mid 1990s, and the first midfielder to do it since Jack O'Shea in the early 1980s.

Tyrone's 2006 campaign was plagued by injury from the start, and they were disappointingly knocked out of the championship by Laois. The early exit allowed players to take up 'ringer' positions in American GAA leagues and Cavanagh was one of the players that took up the offer.

In the 2007 Championship, Cavanagh struck up an effective midfield partnership with Kevin Hughes, and undertook some free kick duties in the absence of Tyrone's regular free-takes due to injury. He won his second Ulster Championship in July, when he scored four points in the Ulster Final. In the All-Ireland quarter final, Cavanagh scored a spectacular solo-effort goal against Meath, but was unable to inspire Tyrone to victory and they crashed out of the Championship. Colm O'Rourke, RTÉ Sport's pundit, remarked about how Cavanagh was able to run faster while controlling the ball, than some players running after him.

In the 2008 Championship, Cavanagh picked up his third All-Ireland winners' medal after Tyrone triumphed against Kerry on 21 September 2008. After the game he was named RTÉ Man of the Match for his five-point contribution.

In the 2013 Championship, Joe Brolly criticized Cavanagh on-air after he received the man of the match award for helping Tyrone to an All-Ireland quarter-final victory over Monaghan at Croke Park. Mayo put paid to Tyrone's All-Ireland hopes in the semi-final. Cavanagh still ended the year with his fifth All Star.

Ahead of 2014, he was named Tyrone captain, succeeding Stephen O'Neill.

=== International ===
Cavanagh represented Ireland several times in the International Rules Series, and was chosen to play for them for the unsuccessful 2005 and 2006 campaigns. In 2008, Cavanagh was named as the captain of the Ireland team, leading them on to win the series, with 27 of Ireland's total of 102 points.

== Gaelic Players Association controversy ==
In February 2007, the Tyrone County Board issued a statement criticising the actions and ideals of the Gaelic Players Association (GPA), and urged the GAA in an open letter to not give the GPA officially recognised status. This put the Tyrone players into a difficult situation, as many were active members of the organisation. One of the main opponents of the county board's position was Seán Cavanagh, and has since gone on record defending the actions of the GPA, and criticising those of the board, stating, "they were not speaking for me or the Tyrone footballers, or the majority of GAA people in this county." Cavanagh is one of the more visible proponents of the GPA, often starring in advertising campaigns for GPA affiliates, such as Club Energize.

== Honours ==
- MacRory Cup (1): 2000
- All-Ireland Intermediate Club Football Championship (1): 2017/18
- Ulster Intermediate Club Football Championship (1): 2017
- Tyrone Intermediate Football Championship (1): 2017
- Ulster Minor Football Championship (2): 2000, 2001
- All-Ireland Minor Football Championship (1): 2001
- Ulster Under-21 Football Championship (2): 2002, 2003
- Dr McKenna Cup (7): 2004, 2005, 2006, 2007, 2012, 2013, 2014, 2015, 2016
- National Football League (2): 2002, 2003
- Ulster Senior Football Championship (6): 2003, 2007, 2009, 2010, 2016, 2017
- All-Ireland Senior Football Championship (3): 2003, 2005, 2008

Awards

- Irish News Ulster All Stars (6): 2003, 2004, 2005, 2007, 2008, 2012
- GAA GPA All Stars Awards (5): 2003, 2004, 2005, 2008, 2013
- GPA Footballer of the Year (1): 2008
- Texaco Footballer of the Year (1): 2008
- All Stars Footballer of the Year (1): 2008
- All Stars Young Footballer of the Year (1): 2003
- Ulster Colleges All Star (1): 2000
- All-Ireland Football Final man of the Match (1): 2008
- BBC Northern Ireland Sports Personality of the Year (1): 2008
- In May 2020, the Irish Independent named Cavanagh at number thirteen in its "Top 20 footballers in Ireland over the past 50 years".

Sporting positions
Preceded by Stephen O'Neill	Tyrone Senior Football Captain; 2014–2017	Succeeded by Mattie Donnelly
Awards
Preceded by Marc Ó Sé (Kerry)	All Stars Footballer of the Year; 2008	Succeeded by Paul Galvin (Kerry)
