= Brian Dooher =

Tyrone Gaelic footballer and manager

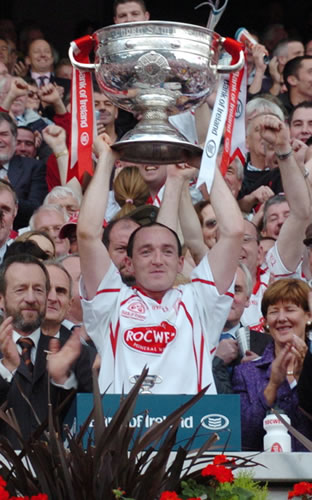

Personal information
- Born: 10 August 1975 (age 51) County Tyrone, Northern Ireland
- Occupation: Veterinarian
- Height: 5 ft 10 in (178 cm)

Sport
- Sport: Gaelic football
- Position: Right Half Forward
Club
- Years: Club
- Clann na nGael
College
- Years: College
- 1993–1996: UCD
College titles
- Sigerson titles: 1
Inter-county
Years	County	Apps (scores)
1995–2011 2020–2024	Tyrone (player); Tyrone (manager)	48
Inter-county titles
- Ulster titles: 6
- All-Irelands: 3
- NFL: 2
- All Stars: 3

Brian Dooher is an Irish former Gaelic footballer who was a member the senior Tyrone county team between 1995 and 2011. He co-managed the Tyrone senior football team alongside Feargal Logan, succeeding Mickey Harte from 2020 until he stepped down from the role in August 2024, winning the All-Ireland with Tyrone in 2021.

He won three All-Ireland Senior Football Championship medals, five Ulster Senior Football Championship and two National League titles with the county. He has also won three All Star Awards, and six Ulster All-Stars - the joint leader with Kieran McGeeney and Steven McDonnell.

Dooher played his club football for Clann na nGael.

Dooher was renowned for his hardworking playing style, often doing the gritty, unfashionable work, like picking up the ball in defence, to feed the forward players. He was also an accurate point scorer. Although he usually started in the half-forward line, his roaming nature meant he was rarely ever stationed there for very long. His contributions to the game did not go unnoticed by his teammates, as Seán Cavanagh remarked in 2003 how "I wouldn't be able to [play to my strengths] without Brian's workrate." In the same article, the Irish Examiner said, "it would be no exaggeration to call him the hardest working footballer in Ireland." He is a father to Conor, Shay, Jack & Mia Dooher.

== Personal life ==
Dooher is a former pupil of Loughash Primary School (County Tyrone) and St Columb's College in Derry City. He later attended UCD in Dublin where he studied Veterinary Medicine. After initially working in private practice in Derry, he joined the Department of Agriculture, Environment and Rural Affairs (DAERA) where he has been appointed as the Chief Veterinary Officer (CVO) for N. Ireland.

== Playing career ==
=== Inter-county ===
Dooher made his Senior debut for Tyrone in the National League in 1995 against Kildare. In 1996, his first full year as a Senior, Dooher helped Tyrone win the Ulster Senior Football Championship. Tyrone then advanced to play Meath in the All-Ireland semi-final, but were defeated. Dooher was one of several Tyrone players, along with Ciaran McBride, Jody Gormley, Chris Lawn and Peter Canavan who suffered injuries at the hands of what many Tyrone fans perceived as heavy-handed tactics by Meath. Meath defender, Martin O'Connell stood on Dooher's head while he had been felled. During the half-time interval, Dooher had to receive staples in his head, and played the rest of the game heavily bandaged. Despite this, he won the Ulster GAA Writers Player of the Year Award, at the age of just 20.

In 2001 Tyrone won the Ulster Championship, with victory over Cavan in the final. In 2002 Dooher helped Tyrone win the county's first ever National League title, beating Cavan in the final.

Dooher accepts the Sam Maguire Cup for the second time in 2008

2003 proved to Tyrone' most successful year ever. The year began with Tyrone defending their National League crown, seeing off Laois in the decider. They won the Ulster Championship beating Down in the final, after a replay. RTÉ pundit and former player Colm O'Rourke claimed that year Dooher was one of the weak links in the Tyrone team, and that he would "eat his hat" if Tyrone won the All-Ireland with Dooher in the team. Dooher's response was modest, stating that O'Rourke was entitled to his opinion, but that he only cares what the Tyrone manager Mickey Harte thinks. Tyrone did go on to win the All-Ireland (the county's first ever), and Dooher was included in the starting lineup throughout the season. Dooher received an All-Star award for his performances that year.

Following the untimely death of Tyrone captain Cormac McAnallen in 2004, Dooher was handed the Tyrone captaincy. The following year Tyrone won the All-Ireland for a second time, this time with Dooher as captain. As Dooher was making his acceptance speech after lifting the Sam Maguire Cup, he made an emotional eulogy to McAnallen, remarking how he knew Cormac was with him. There was also a hugely emotional moment between Dooher and manager Mickey Harte after the final whistle. Surrounded by dozens of photojournalists, and thousands of Tyrone fans, the two men embraced in tearful remembrance of their fallen captain. Dooher was once again honoured with an All Star.

Dooher missed most of the 2006 campaign because of a shattered kneecap, but returned to Championship action in 2007. He helped Tyrone reach the Ulster final with a man of the match display against Donegal in the semi-final in which he scored 0-05. Tyrone went on to defeat Monaghan in the Ulster decider.

Tyrone faced Kerry again in the 2008 All-Ireland final, with Tyrone again coming out on top. Dooher became one of only a small number of men to captain two All-Ireland winning teams. This followed a season where his commanding performances spurred the team on during their more difficult encounters. In Tyrone's emphatic quarter final victory over Dublin, Dooher was named man of the match. He received a third All Star that year.

In September 2011, Dooher retired from inter-county football after 16 years.

=== School / college ===
Dooher won the Sigerson Cup with University College Dublin in 1996.

=== International Rules ===
Dooher represented Ireland in the International Rules Series.

=== Province ===
Dooher played for Ulster in the Railway Cup.

=== Managerial career ===
Dooher, with Feargal Logan and later Peter Canavan, was part of the Tyrone under-21 management team when they won the All-Ireland in 2015, defeating Tipperary in the final. In November 2020, Dooher and Logan were appointed co-managers of the Tyrone senior team, succeeding Mickey Harte. Dooher and Logan stepped down from the role in August 2024 following a disappointing season where they were beaten by Donegal in the semi-finals of the Ulster Championship and their campaign came to a close with defeat to Roscommon at the preliminary quarter-final stage of the All-Ireland.

Preceded by Dara Ó Cinnéide (Kerry)	All-Ireland Senior Football winning captain 2005	Succeeded by Declan O'Sullivan (Kerry)
Preceded by Declan O'Sullivan (Kerry)	All-Ireland Senior Football winning captain 2008	Succeeded by Darran O'Sullivan (Kerry)
