= Paul Curran (Gaelic footballer) =

Dublin Gaelic footballer

Personal information
- Native name: Pól Ó Curraoin (Irish)
- Nickname: Curraner
- Born: Dublin, Ireland
- Occupation: Travel consultant
- Height: 5 ft 10 in (178 cm)

Sport
- Sport: Gaelic football
- Position: Right half-back
Club
- Years: Club
- Thomas Davis
Club titles
- Dublin titles: 3
- Leinster titles: 2
Inter-county
- Years: County
- Dublin
Inter-county titles
- Leinster titles: 6
- All-Irelands: 1
- NFL: 2
- All Stars: 3

Paul Curran is an Irish former Gaelic footballer who played for the Thomas Davis club and for the Dublin county team. Later becoming a manager, as of 2024, he was with Dunshaughlin GAA, having won the Meath Intermediate Football Championship with the club in 2022. He was previously with the Dublin Under-21 team, as part of Jim Gavin's backroom team, and has also been a manager with Ballymun Kickhams and Clann na nGael of Roscommon. In October 2018, he was linked with the Roscommon senior football managerial role which was left vacant by the departure of Kevin McStay.

== Sporting career ==
At club level, Curran was on the Thomas Davis team that dominated the era of 1989 to 1991 when the club won three Dublin Senior Football Championships in-a-row and winning back to back Leinster Club Championships.

Curran has six Leinster Senior Football medals with Dublin, dating from 1989, 1992, 1993, 1994, 1995 and 2002.

He was also a member of the Dublin team that won the National Football League in 1991 and 1993.

Curran was later part of the Dublin team that beat Tyrone in the 1995 All-Ireland Senior Football Championship final, and was awarded the Texaco Footballer of the Year award in 1995. He also the vice captain of the Dublin Senior football team. He played at right half back during the 1995 final.

Curran was awarded three All-Stars for his performances with Dublin: in 1992, 1995 and 1996. He was also named on the annual Dublin Blue Stars football team on six successive years in a variety of positions.

== Management and punditry ==
As a manager, he won the 2012 Dublin senior football championship as manager of Ballymun Kickhams, also winning the club's first ever Leinster Club Championship in the same year. He went on to manage Clann na nGael, of County Roscommon, to a Senior title in 2015. He also managed Cuala to back to back Senior 2 Championships in 2020 and 2021.

Curran has also been an occasional panelist on RTÉ's The Sunday Game.

== Positions ==
Curran, who was a versatile player, played in several positions for Dublin during his inter-county career. In his first senior football year of 1990, Curran played at midfield for Dublin, partnering his clubmate Dave Foran. In 1991, he was at centre half-back, and he changed again in 1992 when was picked right half-back. The changes continued in 1993 when he was selected at left half-back. Then, in 1994, he played at centre half-forward while in 1995 he was named at midfield alongside Erins Isle's Keith Barr. However, he played in the 1995 All-Ireland final at right half back.

== Family ==
Paul Curran's father, Noel Curran, is also a winner of an All-Ireland medal. He played as a forward on the Meath team which won the All Ireland in 1967.

Preceded by Mickey Linden (Down)	Texaco Footballer of the Year; 1995	Succeeded by Martin O'Connell (Meath)
