= Peter Canavan =

Irish Gaelic football player and manager (born 1971)

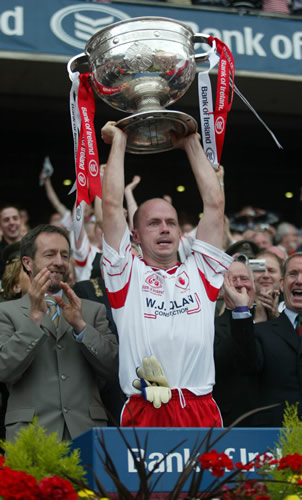
- Canavan lifting the Sam Maguire Cup in 2003

Personal information
- Nicknames: Peter 'The Great', 'Petrol Pete' God
- Born: 9 April 1971 (age 55) Ballygawley, County Tyrone, Northern Ireland
- Occupation: Teacher
- Height: 5 ft 8 in (173 cm)

Sport
- Sport: Gaelic football
- Position: Forward
Club
- Years: Club
- 1990–2007: Errigal Ciarán
Club titles
- Tyrone titles: 6
- Ulster titles: 2
Inter-county**
Years	County	Apps (scores)
1989–2005	Tyrone	49 (9–191 {218})
Inter-county titles
- Ulster titles: 5
- All-Irelands: 2
- NFL: 2
- All Stars: 6
- **Inter County team apps and scores correct as of (22:03, 21 December 2006 (UTC)).

Peter Canavan (born 9 April 1971) is an Irish former Gaelic footballer, manager and pundit.

He played inter-county football for Tyrone, and is one of the most decorated players in the game's history, winning two All-Ireland Senior Football Championship medals, six All Stars Awards (more than any other Ulster player, and joint third overall), four provincial titles, and two National Leagues and several under-age and club championship medals. He represented Ireland in the International Rules Series on several occasions from 1998 until 2000. He is considered one of the great players of the last twenty years by commentators such as John Haughey of the BBC, and in 2009, he was named in the Sunday Tribune's list of the 125 Most Influential People in GAA History.

His scoring record of 218 points is the fourth highest of all time in the Ulster Senior Football Championship. His early high scoring rate, when he would often be Tyrone's best performer – particularly in the 1995 All-Ireland Senior Football Championship final when he scored eleven of Tyrone's twelve points—led to claims that Tyrone was a "one-man show," and that the team was too dependent on him, particularly in his early career.

Since retiring as a player, he has managed the Fermanagh county team (2011–2013).

== Early life and family ==
Canavan is from Glencull, near Ballygawley, County Tyrone, and was the tenth of eleven children. His older brother, Pascal, played with him on the Tyrone panel for most of the 1990s. He is married to Finola (sister of former Tyrone teammate Ronan McGarrity), and has four children, Aine, Claire, Darragh and Ruairí, and has been a physical education teacher in Holy Trinity College, Cookstown, throughout most of his career (Gaelic games are amateur sports). While there, he taught Owen Mulligan his point-taking technique, and the pair have been known in the media as 'master and student' ever since, particularly by television commentators.

In 2003, just over a week before Tyrone's Ulster final appearance against Down, Canavan's father, Seán, died. It came as a shock to Canavan, who had thought his father (who was already in hospital) was getting better. He decided to play in the match, stating that he knew, subconsciously "[he] was going to be playing in the Ulster final all along and Daddy certainly wouldn't have wanted [him] to do anything but play."

Canavan has suffered from asthma since he was a child, and has battled throughout his career to control the ailment. He told the Asthma Society of Ireland, "I thought to myself, this is something that I am just going to have to put up with." In later years, however, improved medication has afforded Canavan what he described as, "a better quality of life".

== Under-age career ==
To play for an inter-county GAA team, Canavan had to work around a Gaelic Athletic Association (GAA) bylaw, because of a dispute in his parish, Errigal Ciarán. Two clubs claimed to represent the parish, the established Ballygawley St Ciaran's club and the newly formed club, then called Errigal Ciaran Naomh Malachai. Players from the Errigal team were not recognised as being GAA members, because the club failed to register correctly. Canavan registered as a member of the Killyclogher hurling club, even though he didn't play the sport, just so he would be eligible for selection for the Tyrone minors. Prior to that, he had not played legitimate club football, but had forged his way onto the Tyrone under-age teams with his performances at school level. The two clubs united under the banner of Errigal Ciaran two years later.

In 1988, Canavan won the All-Ireland Minor Football Championship (MFC), an under eighteens tournament, but lost in the All-Ireland MFC semi-final to Kerry. The crux of this team, including Adrian Cush, Ciaran Corr and others, would stay together as part of the senior team for most of the nineties. Canavan captained Tyrone to two All-Ireland Under-21 Football Championship titles in 1991 and 1992, having been on the team which lost the 1990 final, again to Kerry. In four years as an Under 21 player, Canavan scored 13–53 (13 goals and 53 points—each goal equals 3 points; 13 × 3 + 53 = 92 points, see GAA scoring rules) for Tyrone. By the time he was twenty, he was already an automatic choice in the senior panel.

== Early senior career: 1993–1998 ==
Canavan's name was already known around Tyrone because of his exploits for the Under 21 team, but he started to make an impact in the Ulster Senior Football Championship in 1994, as Tyrone lost to eventual All-Ireland SFC champions, Down. He was the top scorer in the province, and his performances earned him his first All Star, at the age of 23.

=== 1995 All-Ireland SFC final ===
Throughout the 1995 championship, Canavan had spearheaded Tyrone's march to the final, with round after round of massive scoring exploits. Against Derry in the Ulster SFC semi-final, he scored 0–8, and against Galway in the All-Ireland SFC semi-final, he scored 1–7.

Tyrone reached their second All-Ireland SFC final in 1995, and were up against Dublin who hadn't won a championship title since the 1980s. In a turgid match, Canavan scored eleven of Tyrone's twelve points in the, but still ended up on the losing side. The game was remembered as contentious for Tyrone fans, for the fact that a point that would have equalised the match in the dying seconds was controversially disallowed, because the blind-sided referee deemed Canavan to have touched the ball on the ground. The referee, Paddy Russell stated in his autobiography that he was certain the ball was on the ground, but Canavan contested in the same book that he managed to get elevation on the ball as he punched, which would have been very difficult to do if it was touching the ground. He was the top scorer in Ireland that year, with a total of 1–38, earning him the inaugural Footballer of the Year title. The fact that Canavan's scoring tally was so far ahead of his peers on the team led to suggestions that Tyrone were depending too heavily on him.

=== 1996: Injury ===
For the 1996 championship, Canavan was handed the captaincy of Tyrone, and was Ulster's leading scorer for the third consecutive season, and subsequently awarded his third successive All Star. Tyrone reached the All-Ireland SFC semi-final against Meath, but Canavan was one of six Tyrone players to sustain injuries that day, which some Tyrone fans attribute to Meath's heavy-handedness. Canavan's injury was so severe that he was still feeling the effects for over a year, and there was speculation as to whether he had been playing on a broken foot.

== 1998–2000: International stage ==
During a weak period for Tyrone Seniors in the late 1990s, Canavan represented Ireland in the inaugural International Rules Series in 1998 against Australia. In 1999, he was named vice-captain of the team for the tour to Australia, and Ireland came away convincing winners, with Canavan scoring eleven points in the first test in Adelaide, South Australia. In 2000, In the first test Australia's Jason Akermanis gave Canavan a bloody nose 20 seconds into the game. Canavan was sent off in the second test, after fighting with Akermanis. He was banned for one match, which wouldn't be played until the next year, so he ruled himself out of the next series. In five tests Canavan scored 37 points, becoming one of the few Irish players to leave their mark on the Australian supporters.

== Late senior career ==
Tyrone were one of the favourites for the 2002 All-Ireland SFC, having won their first National Football League title in the spring, but ended up losing a qualifying match to Sligo, even though Canavan scored six points on the day. That particular defeat stunned him so much, he considered retiring from inter-county football. Despite that, he won his fourth All Star that year, the only Tyrone player to do so, which made him Tyrone's most represented player on the All Star Roll of Honour, overtaking Eugene McKenna, his manager at the time.

=== 2003: Championship glory ===
In 2003, Canavan shook off his tag as 'the greatest player never to win an All-Ireland', captaining Tyrone to their first All-Ireland Senior Football Championship. As he approached the podium on Croke Park's Hogan Stand after the final, his nervousness was visible, and after being handed the trophy, he made an emotional speech about how he had to enviously watch other Ulster teams lift the Sam Maguire Cup, but "to eventually win it is something else."

His appearance in the final was remarkable for the fact that he was the top scorer of the day with five points, despite having suffered an ankle injury in the previous match, and was not expected (or advised) to play. He started the final and was taken off before half time. During the break, and even some way into the second half, he was receiving treatment to his ankle, including pain-killing injections.
With ten minutes remaining, he was reintroduced by manager Mickey Harte, likely due to his experience as the only member of the team who had played in an All-Ireland SFC final before. This reintroduction, while not the first time it had happened (blood substitutions had been used sporadically, for example), was seen as one of the greatest moments in the GAA in the previous forty years.

In the drawn Ulster SFC final against Down, Canavan was playing a week after the death of his father. He remarked in his autobiography that he feared Tyrone were going to lose by one of the biggest margins in Ulster SFC history, if they didn't stem the flow of the Down attack. When Tyrone were awarded a penalty, Canavan stepped up, due to Stephen O'Neill (the first choice penalty-taker) being on the bench. He took the kick, and managed to find the net, later describing it as "the most important [kick] of my career," citing the fact that if Tyrone had been heavily beaten, they probably wouldn't have been able to pick themselves up to play in the 'back door' qualifier series.

Over the course of the 2003 Championship, he amassed a total of 1–48 (a total of 51 points), and had won the National League in the spring, all of which earned him a fifth All Star. Among his more notable performances of the year included an eight-point haul in the replayed first round match against Derry, and in the replayed Ulster SFC final, Canavan scored eleven points.

He became the first GAA star to gain an honorary doctorate from the University of Ulster, and was also voted BBC Northern Ireland Sports Personality of the Year, a regional award of the BBC Sports Personality of the Year. Following an email campaign throughout Ireland, Canavan was an early forerunner for the national award, despite the fact that Gaelic games have very little exposure in Great Britain.

Following the 2003 final, Canavan relinquished the captaincy to Cormac McAnallen, but the 24-year-old died shortly after taking up the position. This tragedy adversely affected the mindset of the team, and they were unable to defend their All-Ireland SFc title.

=== 2005: Championship swan song ===
Canavan was used mostly as an 'impact substitute' throughout the 2005 Championship—brought on to either unsettle the opposition, or rally his teammates. This backfired when he was controversially sent off within a minute of coming on as a substitute in the Ulster SFC final replay.

In the All-Ireland SFC semi-final against Armagh (who were meeting Tyrone for the third time that year), Canavan scored with the last kick of the game, winning the match for Tyrone. Kevin McStay, a former Mayo player, described it as the point of the season, despite the free kick being from a relatively straightforward position.

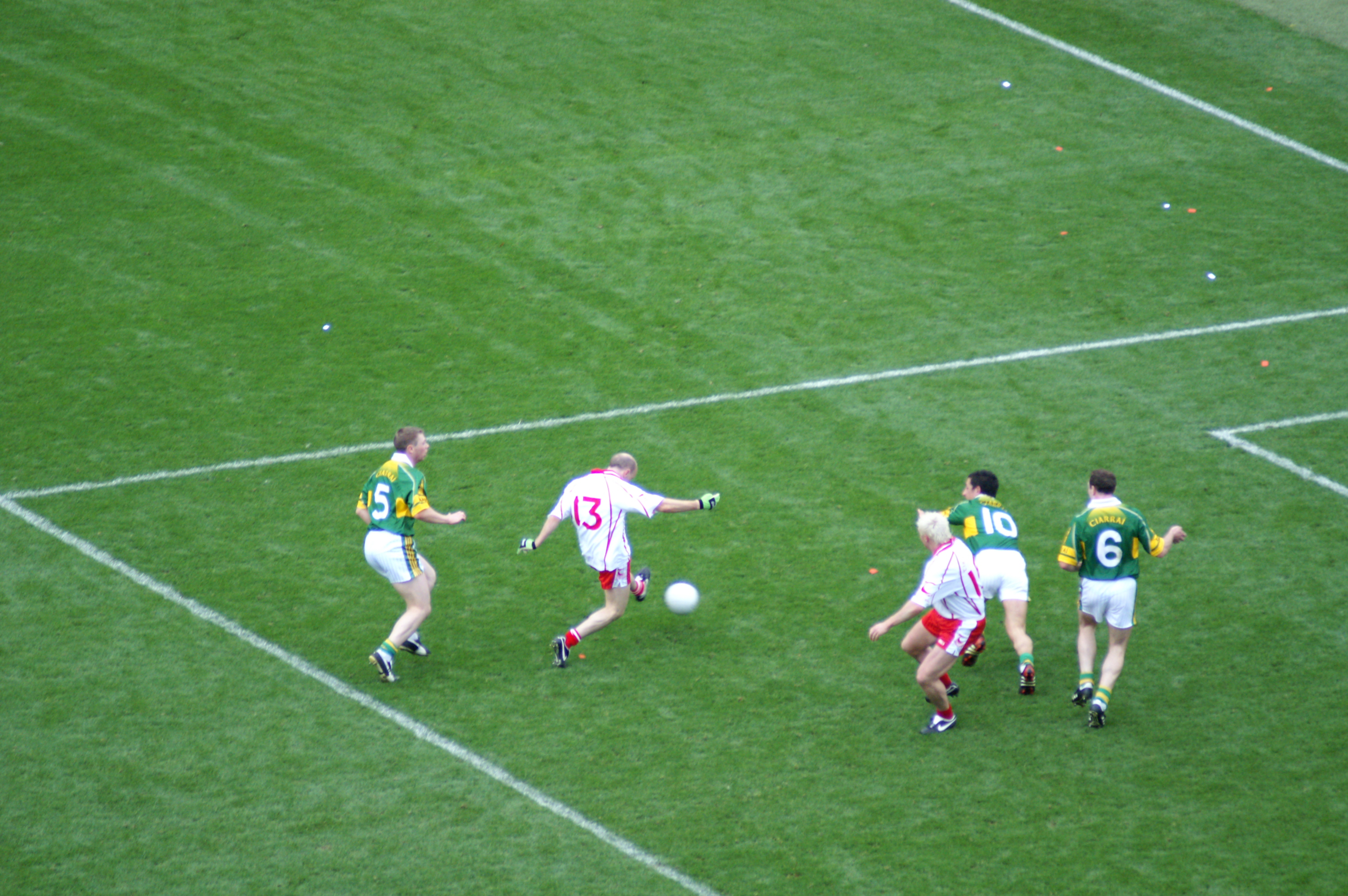
Canavan (13, white) drilling home Tyrone's winning goal in the 2005 All-Ireland final

Mickey Harte chose Canavan on the starting line-up of the All-Ireland SFC final and went on to score Tyrone's only goal, winning on a scoreline of 1–16 to 2–10.

He retired from inter-county football following this performance with a sixth All Star, ending a sixteen-year tenure in Senior championship football. He said of his decision, "I have spent enough time on the treatment table", referring to the instances where he played while carrying potentially career-threatening injuries, as he had done in 1996 and 2003. Canavan's appearance in the 2005 final (his last game for Tyrone), was his forty-ninth Championship match.

== Other inter-county successes ==
Canavan was part of both Tyrone sides that won the National Football League title two consecutive seasons (2002 and 2003)—and he competed in the 1994 final against Derry. His success in other competitions include five Railway Cups, two Vocational Schools titles, and one Dr McKenna Cup.

== Club career ==
After retiring from inter-county football, he continued to play at club level for Errigal Ciarán until 2007. During the seventeen years he played he won six Tyrone Senior Club titles and two Ulster Club Championships, and in 2006, he won his first Tyrone All Star for his performances in the club championship. In December 2008, he moved into management for the first time, by taking charge of Errigal Ciaran, leading them to win the Tyrone All County League final in 2009.

== Disciplinary problems ==
His career features some instances of indiscipline, which, like many players of the era, included occasional on-pitch scuffles with other players. Jack O'Connor, Kerry's manager in the 2005 All-Ireland SFC final suggested in his autobiography that Canavan tackled Colm Cooper off the ball, preventing him getting into a goal-scoring position, a claim backed up by Sunday Tribune journalist, Kieran Shannon.

== Managerial career ==
Canavan was appointed manager of Fermanagh in November 2011 on a three-year term to be reviewed annually, with trainer Kieran Donnelly and selector Enda Kilpatrick joining him. His first game against Antrim, saw Fermanagh winning by a scoreline of 2 – 11 to 1 – 06.

He stepped down as Fermanagh manager in September 2013.

However, Canavan was not out of management for long. He was appointed manager of Cavan Gaels in December 2013. He guided them to their 1st Senior Championship in 3 years in October 2014, defeating Kingscourt Stars in the final by a point. This was seen as a huge success for Canavan and the Cavan Gaels Club.

After delivering the Oliver Plunkett trophy back to the Cavan town club, he then went on to become a selector with the Tyrone under-21 panel in 2015. He was part of the management team which consisted of Feargal Logan (manager) and Brian Dooher. They guided the under-21s to an Ulster U21FC final victory against Donegal in Celtic Park, and subsequently, to the All-Ireland U21FC title, defeating Tipperary in the final.

When Mickey Harte left as Tyrone senior manager in 2020, Canavan ruled himself out due to family involvement and did not join Logan and Dooher, who were subsequently appointed as Harte's successors.

== Media career ==
Canavan has written a column for the Gaelic games magazine, Hogan Stand and the Northern Ireland edition of The Daily Mirror. and in 2008, he joined TV3 as a football pundit for their first year of broadcasting live GAA matches.

He is a Gaelic football analyst for the BBC and RTÉ, and previously for Sky Sports.

== Administrative career ==
In January 2025, Canavan joined the Football Review Committee alongside former inter-county referee Maurice Deegan, succeeding previous members Michael Murphy and Malachy O'Rourke when they became unavailable.

== Individual honours ==
- In May 2020, a public poll conducted by RTÉ.ie named Canavan in the half-forward line alongside Pat Spillane and Diarmuid Connolly in a team of footballers who had won All Stars during the era of The Sunday Game.
- Also in May 2020, the Irish Independent named Canavan at number three in its "Top 20 footballers in Ireland over the past 50 years".

Gaelic games
Preceded by First year awarded	All Stars Footballer of the Year; 1995	Succeeded by Trevor Giles (Meath)
Preceded by Kieran McGeeney (Armagh)	All-Ireland Senior Football winning captain 2003	Succeeded by Dara Ó Cinnéide (Kerry)
Preceded by Kieran McGeeney (Armagh)	Texaco Footballer of the Year; 2003	Succeeded by Colm Cooper (Kerry)
