= Fay Devlin =

Irish Gaelic footballer

Personal information
- Nickname: "The Ogg"
- Born: County Tyrone, Ireland
- Height: 5 ft 8 in (173 cm)

Sport
- Sport: Gaelic football
- Position: Corner Back
Club
- Years: Club
- ? -?: Ardboe
Inter-county
- Years: County
- ?- ?: Tyrone
Inter-county titles
- Ulster titles: 2
- All-Irelands: 0
- All Stars: 1

Fay "The Ogg" Devlin (born 1970/1971) is a former Gaelic footballer for the Ardboe club and the Tyrone county team. He played in the 1995 All-Ireland Senior Football Championship Final and won an All Stars Award that year. He is a native of Ardboe, County Tyrone.

== Honours ==
- 3 Ulster Under-21 Football Championships (1990, 1991, 1992,)
- 2 All-Ireland Under-21 Football Championships (1991, 1992)
- 2 Ulster Senior Football Championships (1995, 1996)
- 1 All Star (1995)
- 1 Irish News Ulster All Star (1995)
