= Chris Lawn =

Irish Gaelic footballer

Personal information
- Native name: Críostóir Ó Liatháin (Irish)
- Born: 24 June 1972 (age 54) Tyrone, Northern Ireland

Sport
- Sport: Gaelic football
- Position: Full Back
Club
- Years: Club
- Moortown
Club titles
- Tyrone titles: 1
Inter-county*
Years	County	Apps (scores)
1994-2005	Tyrone	0
Inter-county titles
- Ulster titles: 4
- All-Irelands: 2
- *Inter County team apps and scores correct as of 14:10, 25 November 2006 (UTC).

Chris Lawn is a former Gaelic footballer who played for the Tyrone county team. He was on the substitutes bench for the entirety of the 2003 final, and came on as a substitute in the 2005 final, for the injured Joe McMahon. He has All-Ireland medals from 2003 and 2005. He was nominated for an All-Star award in 1995, but did not win. At club level, he played and managed the Moortown team.

After championship success in 2005, he, along with Peter Canavan, announced his retirement from inter-county football.

After retirement from playing, Lawn managed the Cookstown Fr. Rock's club side and led them to promotion and an intermediate All-Ireland club championship in 2009.
