= Pat O'Neill (Dublin footballer) =

Irish Gaelic footballer and manager

Personal information
- Native name: Pádraig Ó Néill (Irish)
- Born: 22 October 1950 (age 76) Dublin, Ireland

Sport
- Sport: Gaelic football
- Position: Left half-back
Clubs
- Years: Club
- ?–?: Civil Service & UCD
Inter-county
- Years: County
- 1969–?: Dublin
Inter-county titles
- All-Irelands: 2
- All Stars: ?

Pat O'Neill (born 22 October 1950) is a former Gaelic football manager of and player for the senior Dublin county team. A doctor by profession, he is a sports injuries consultant.

== Playing career ==
O'Neill is most renowned in recent years for his period as manager of the Dublin Senior football panel. He managed Dublin to their 22nd all-Ireland in 1995 against Tyrone. O'Neill had been a selector for the Dublin team before he was appointed as senior manager.

O'Neill had a successful playing career. He lifted the Sam Maguire Cup on two occasions for Dublin, in 1976 and 1977. He won two National football league medal with Dublin in 1978 and in 1976. He received an All-Stars Award for his skills in 1977.

| Preceded by Paddy Cullen | Dublin Senior Football Manager; 1992–1995 | Succeeded by Mickey Whelan |
| Preceded by Pete McGrath | All-Ireland SFC-winning manager 1995 | Succeeded by Sean Boylan |
