= Clann na nGael GAA (Tyrone) =

Tyrone-based Gaelic games club

Clann na nGael Aughabrack Dunamanagh G.A.C.
- Clann na nGael
- Founded: 1996
- County: Tyrone
- Colours: Green, Yellow & White
- Grounds: Daniel O'Connell Park, Aughabrack; St. Patrick's Park, Dunamanagh
- Coordinates: 54°49′33.00″N 7°13′34.34″W

Playing kits
Standard

Clann na nGael Aughabrack Dunamanagh G.A.C., is a Gaelic Athletic Association club based in north County Tyrone, Northern Ireland, with its home grounds based at Aughabrack and Dunamanagh.

== History ==
The Club was formed in 1996 from an amalgamation of Dunamanagh and Aughabrack as Donagheady Gaels; renamed Clann na nGael Aughabrack Dunamanagh G.A.C. in 1997.

Aughabrack was established in 1979 as junior club. Previous club existed in the area in 1948-52. Promoted to Division 2 at end of first season of competition, and to Division 1 at end of second season; amalgamated at Youth level with Dunamanagh, St Patrick's as Donagheady; 1995. Won Frank O Neill Cup. Club won two Tyrone titles at Adult Scór.

== Notable players ==
- Brian Dooher
- Stephen O'Neill

== Honours ==
- Tyrone Junior Football League (1): 1997
- Tyrone Intermediate Football Championship (1): 1998
