= Jody Gormley =

Northern Irish Gaelic footballer and manager (1971–2024)

Personal information
- Born: 16 August 1971 County Tyrone, Northern Ireland
- Died: 9 December 2024 (aged 53) Belfast, Northern Ireland
- Occupation: PE teacher
- Height: 5 ft 10 in (178 cm)

Sport
- Sport: Gaelic football
- Position: Midfield
Clubs
- Years: Club
- ? -?: Trillick; Bredagh
Club titles
- Ulster titles: Ulster
Inter-county
- Years: County
- 2002- ? 1999-2001 1995-1998: Tyrone; London; Tyrone
Inter-county titles
- Ulster titles: 2
- All-Irelands: 0
- All Stars: 0

Jody Gormley (16 August 1971 – 9 December 2024) was an Irish Gaelic footballer who played for the Tyrone and London county teams. He also played a coaching role for Down following his retirement from inter-county play, and held the role of Antrim football manager.

== Playing career ==
=== Tyrone ===
His career peak was probably in 1995, when Tyrone won the Ulster Championship, and went on end up runner-up in the All-Ireland Final. For Gormley, who was an ever-present throughout the Championship, memorable moments include scoring the winning point in a scorching Ulster Semi-Final against neighbouring rivals, Derry. This win was notable because the Tyrone team had two players sent off, and were 0-8 to 0-5 down at half time.

In the 1995 All-Ireland Senior Football Championship Final, Tyrone lost to Dublin by a point (Dublin 1-10, Tyrone 0-12). Gormley was only Tyrone player to score in that match, apart from an 11-point masterclass by Peter Canavan.

The following year, Tyrone again won the Ulster Championship, but were beaten in All-Ireland Semi Final by Meath. Gormley was one of several Tyrone players injured in that match, which many Tyrone fans attributed to Meath's heavy-handed tactics.

=== London ===
Tyrone's fortunes faded following this, and Gormley's job brought him to London. There he joined the London county team, but they rarely performed well in the Championship.

=== Clubs ===
In 2006, Jody played midfield on the Bredagh Senior team that won the Down Junior Football Championship Final, defeating Teconnaught 1-8 to 0-5 in Downpatrick. They proceeded to hammer Drum of Derry in the Quarter Final Of The Ulster Junior Championship in Newcastle, County Down but lost to Naomh Brid of Donegal in the Semi at Breffni Park, Cavan.

== Management ==
Gormley started his inter-county management career with Down. After a promising start to the 2006 National League, Down's challenge tailed off, and they were disappointing in the 2006 Ulster Senior Football Championship, and were knocked out of the qualifiers by Sligo, after which, Gormley stepped down.

Now plying his trade as a teacher, Gormley coached Abbey CBS, Newry to their first MacRory Cup final in nineteen years, which they won. The team also went on to win the All-Ireland colleges championship, the Hogan Cup.

Gormley successfully applied to take over the Antrim management for the 2007 All-Ireland Senior Football Championship, a role he held for two seasons.

Gormley moved back into club management, with Longstone, where he took over at the beginning of the 2010 season. He kept the club in the top flight after winning a relegation play-off at the end of the season.

Gormley managed Trillick to the 2023 Tyrone Senior Championship, defeating Errigal Ciarán 1-13 to 0-13 after extra time.

== Personal life and death ==
Gormley was married to Deirdre and had one son and two daughters.

In July 2024, whilst on a family holiday in Florida, Gormley suffered a stroke.

In November 2024, Gormley announced that he had been diagnosed with terminal liver cancer in September and had only months to live. He died from the disease six weeks later, on 9 December, at his home in Belfast. He was 53.
