= Paul Clarke (Irish footballer) =

Dublin Gaelic footballer

Personal information
- Nickname: Clarkie
- Born: 1966 (age 59–60) County Dublin
- Occupation: Firefighter Dublin Airport
- Height: 6 ft 4 in (193 cm)

Sport
- Sport: Gaelic football
- Position: Midfield
Club
- Years: Club
- 26 years: Whitehall Colmcille
Inter-county
- Years: County
- 1985–1997: Dublin
Inter-county titles
- Leinster titles: 6
- All-Irelands: 1
- NFL: 3
- All Stars: 1

Paul Clarke (born 1966) is an Irish former Gaelic footballer who played for the Whitehall Colmcille club and was a senior member of the Dublin county team for a number of years, starting in 1985. He won his only All-Ireland SFC medal in 1995, the same year in which he won his only All Star award. Married in 2015 to Emer Mullaney and first child born Ben Stephen Clarke in June 2016.

== Biography ==
Clarke was born in County Dublin. Having played soccer as a child up to Under-14 level, Clarke began playing Gaelic football while at school at St Aidan's C.B.S., in Dublin. He went on to join Whitehall Colmcille's, his local club, and was quickly noticed and selected for the inter-county Under 14 side, with whom he went on to win an under-14 leinster title. Clarke joined the Dublin minor football team in 1983, and in 1984, led them to an All-Ireland Minor Football Championship as captain. In 1983, he went on a tour of Australia with a colleges team, where try-outs for Australian Rules Football were held, but he was not selected.

In September 1994, Clarke signed for Shelbourne.

== Senior inter-county ==
Clarke joined the Dublin senior panel in October 1985 and had his debut in a win against Donegal in a National League fixture. Over the course of the next decade, he would play in many positions in the backs, midfield and forwards. In 1995, playing in his fourth All-Ireland final, Clarke finally won an All-Ireland Senior Football Championship medal, and also won an All Star award the same year.
