= Finbar McConnell =

Irish Gaelic footballer

Personal information
- Born: 1967 or 1968 (age 58–59) Tyrone, Northern Ireland
- Height: 6 ft 4 in (1.93 m)

Sport
- Sport: Gaelic football
- Position: Goalkeeper
Club
- Years: Club
- Newtonstewart
Inter-county
- Years: County
- Tyrone

Finbar McConnell (born 1967 or 1968 (age 58–59)) is a former Gaelic footballer who played for the Tyrone county team. He was Tyrone's first-choice goalkeeper throughout most of the nineties, and played in the 1995 All-Ireland Senior Football Championship Final. He set a Tyrone record for being the first Tyrone player to win four Ulster Championship medals in 2001.
