= 2003 All-Ireland Senior Football Championship =

Football championship

Championship details
- Dates: 4 May – 21 September 2003
- Teams: 33

All-Ireland Champions
- Winning team: Tyrone (1st win)
- Captain: Peter Canavan
- Manager: Mickey Harte

All-Ireland Finalists
- Losing team: Armagh
- Captain: Kieran McGeeney
- Manager: Joe Kernan

Provincial Champions
- Munster: Kerry
- Leinster: Laois
- Ulster: Tyrone
- Connacht: Galway

Championship statistics
- No. matches played: 65
- Goals total: 97 (1.49 per game)
- Points total: 1478 (22.73 per game)
- Top Scorer: Peter Canavan (1–48)
- Player of the Year: Steven McDonnell

The 2003 All-Ireland Senior Football Championship was the 117th staging of the All-Ireland Senior Football Championship, the Gaelic Athletic Association's premier inter-county Gaelic football tournament. The championship began on 4 May 2003 and ended on 28 September 2003.

Armagh entered the championship as the defending champions.

On 28 September 2003, Tyrone won the championship following a 0–12 to 0–9 defeat of Armagh in the All-Ireland final. This was their first All-Ireland title.

Tyrone's Peter Canavan was the championship's top scorer with 1–48. Armagh forward Steven McDonnell was the choice for the Vodafone Footballer of the Year award.

== Format ==
The provincial championships in Munster, Leinster, Ulster and Connacht were run as usual on a "knock-out" basis. These provincial games were then followed by the "Qualifier" system:

- Round 1 of the qualifiers included all the counties (except New York) that did not qualify for the Provincial Semi-finals. An open draw was made to give eight pairings.
- Round 2 consisted of the eight defeated teams in the Provincial Semi-finals playing against the eight winners from Round 1. A draw was made to determine the eight pairings.
- Round 3 consisted of the eight winners from Round 2. Another open draw was made to determine the four pairings.
- Round 4 consisted of the four winners from Round 3 playing against the beaten Provincial finalists. A draw was made to determine the pairings.

The All-Ireland Quarter-finals: Each of the four Provincial Champions played one of the four winners from Round 4. The All-Ireland Semi-finals were played on a Provincial rota basis, initially determined by the Central Council. If a Provincial Championship winning team was defeated in its Quarter-final, the team that defeated it took its place in the semi-final.

== Provincial championships ==
=== Connacht Senior Football Championship ===
Quarter-finals
New York | 0–12
Leitrim | 0–14
Roscommon | 0–08
Galway | 0–12
London | 0–09
Sligo | 3–11

Semi-finals
Leitrim | 1–07
Galway | 2–13
Mayo | 0–14
Sligo | 0–11

Final
Galway | 1–14
Mayo | 0–13

Quarter-finals

| 4 May 2003 Quarter-final | New York | 0–12 – 0–14 (aet) | Leitrim | Gaelic Park, New York City |
| | K Lily 0–5, E Reilly 0–3, F O’Neill 0–2, G Dowd 0–1, B O’Driscoll 0–1. | | P McLoughlin 0–8, O Maguire 0–2, S Quinn 0–2, S Canning 0–1, C Regan 0–1. | Referee: S McCormack (Meath) |

| 18 May 2003 Quarter-final | Galway | 0–12 – 0–8 | Roscommon | Pearse Stadium, Galway |
| | P Joyce 0–5, M Meehan 0–3, P Clancy 0–2, S Óg de Paor 0–1, K Walsh 0–1. | | J Dunning 0–3, N Dineen 0–1, S O’Neill 0–1, S Lohan 0–1, F Grehan 0–1, F Dolan 0–1. | Referee: J Bannon (Longford) |

| 25 May 2003 Quarter-final | London | 0–9 – 3–11 | Sligo | Emerald GAA Grounds, Ruislip |
| | C Foody 0–4, P Hehir 0–3, JP O’Donnell 0–2. | | J McPartland 2–0, E O’Hara 1–1, D Sloyan 0–3, P Naughton 0–2, P Doohan 0–1, D Durkin 0–1, P Durcan 0–1, G McGowan 0–1, P Taylor 0–1. | Referee: D Coldrick (Meath) |

Semi-finals

| 1 June 2003 Semi-final | Leitrim | 1–7 – 2–13 | Galway | Páirc Sheáin Mhic Dhiarmada, Carrick-on-Shannon |
| | P McLoughlin 0–5, S Quinn 1–1, F McBrien 0–1. | | D Savage 1–2, M Meehan 1–0, M Clancy 0–3, P Joyce 0–3, J Bergin 0–2, P Clancy 0–1, J Fallon 0–1, S Óg de Paor 0–1. | Referee: J Geaney (Cork) |

| 8 June 2003 Semi-final | Mayo | 0–14 – 0–11 | Sligo | Markievicz Park, Sligo |
| | C Mortimer 0–5, G Brady 0–2, F Costello 0–2, J Gill 0–1, T Mortimer 0–1, D Sweeney 0–1, A Dillon 0–1, S Carolan 0–1. | | D Sloyan 0–7, P Doohan 0–2, M McNamara 0–1, G McGowan 0–1. | Referee: A Mangan (Kerry) |

Final

| 6 July 2003 Final | Galway | 1–14 – 0–13 | Mayo | Pearse Stadium, Galway |
| | M Clancy 1–2, J Bergin 0–4, P Joyce 0–2, M Meehan 0–2, D Meehan 0–1, S Óg de Paor 0–1, D Savage 0–1, N Joyce 0–1. | | C Mortimer 0–6, M Sheridan 0–2, D Sweeney 0–1, J Gill 0–1, B Maloney 0–1, G Brady 0–1, S Carolan 0–1. | Referee: M Monahan (Kildare) |

=== Munster Senior Football Championship ===
Quarter-finals
Limerick | 0–16
Cork | 0–06
Waterford | 1–12
Tipperary | 0–18

Semi-finals
Limerick | 2–14
Clare | 0–12
Kerry | 0–25
Tipperary | 1–10

Final
Limerick | 0–09
Kerry | 1–11

Quarter-finals

| 11 May 2003 Quarter-final | Cork | 0–6 – 0–16 | Limerick | Páirc Uí Chaoimh, Cork |
| | C Corkery 0–4, N O’Leary 0–1, M O Cronin 0–1. | | M Gavin 0–9, J Murphy 0–1, J Quane 0–1, S Kelly 0–1, S Lavin 0–1, C Fitzgerald 0–1, B Begley 0–1, M Reidy 0–1. | Referee: B White (Wexford) |

| 25 May 2003 Quarter-final | Waterford | 1–12 – 0–18 | Tipperary | Walsh Park, Waterford |
| | C Power 1–4, A Hubbart 0–2, G Hurney 0–2, J Coffey 0–1, K O’Keeffe 0–1, J Hennessy 0–1, W Hennessy 0–1. | | D Browne 0–11, F O’Callaghan 0–2, L England 0–2, A Fitzgerald 0–1, D Fanning 0–1, B Hahessy 0–1. | Referee: D Joyce (Galway) |

Semi-final

| 15 June 2003 Semi-final | Clare | 0–12 – 2–14 | Limerick | Cusack Park, Ennis |
| | O O'Dwyer 0–4, D Russell 0–2, C Whelan 0–1, G Quinlan 0–1, M O'Dwyer 0–1, P McMahon 0–1, R Donnelly 0–1, D O'Driscoll 0–1. | | M Gavin 0–7, C Fitzgerald 1–2, J Murphy 1–0, M Reidy 0–2, S Kelly 0–2, S Lavin 0–1. | Referee: D Coldrick (Meath) |

| 15 June 2003 Semi-final | Kerry | 0–25 – 1–10 | Tipperary | Austin Stack Park, Tralee |
| | C Cooper 0–5, MF Russell 0–4, S O'Sullivan 0–3, D Quill 0–3, D O'Sullivan 0–3, J Crowley 0–2, D Ó Cinnéide 0–1, E Brosnan 0–1, L Hassett 0–1, D Ó Sé 0–1, S Scanlon 0–1. | | D Browne 1–5, A Fitzgerald 0–2, F O'Callaghan 0–2, L England 0–1. | Referee: J McKee (Armagh) |

Final

| 13 July 2003 Final | Kerry | 1–11 – 0–9 | Limerick | Fitzgerald Stadium, Killarney |
| | D Ó Cinnéide 1–6, L Hassett 0–2, C Cooper 0–1, A Mac Gearailt 0–1, J Crowley 0–1. | | M Gavin 0–2, C Fitzgerald 0–2, M Reidy 0–1, S Lucey 0–1, C Mullane 0–1, J Stokes 0–1, S Kelly 0–1. | Referee: B Crowe (Cavan) |

=== Ulster Senior Football Championship ===
Preliminary round
Armagh | 0–09
Monaghan | 0–13

Quarter-finals
Cavan | 1–10
Antrim | 2–09
Derry | 1–05
Tyrone | 0–17
Monaghan | 0–13
Down | 1–12
Fermanagh | 0–10
Donegal | 0–06

Semi-finals
Antrim | 1–09
Tyrone | 1–17
Down | 2–10
Fermanagh | 0–11

Final
Tyrone | 0–23
Down | 1–05

Preliminary round

| 11 May 2003 Preliminary round | Monaghan | 0–13 – 0–9 | Armagh | St. Tiernach's Park, Clones |
| | P Finlay 0–8, R Ronaghan 0–2, N Corrigan 0–1, T Freeman 0–1, M Slowey 0–1. | | D Marsden 0–2, S McDonnell 0–2, P Loughran 0–2, P McKeever 0–2, T McEntee 0–1. | Referee: M Curley (Galway) |

Quarter-finals

| 18 May 2003 Quarter-final | Derry | 1–9 – 0–12 | Tyrone | St. Tiernach's Park, Clones |
| | P Bradley 1–6, E Muldoon 0–2, P McFlynn 0–1. | | P Canavan 0–6, B Dooher 0–3, S O’Neill 0–1, G Cavlan 0–1, K Hughes 0–1. | Referee: P McEneaney (Monaghan) |

| 24 May 2003 Quarter-final replay | Tyrone | 0–17 – 1–5 | Derry | Casement Park, Belfast |
| | P Canavan 0–8, S Cavanagh 0–3, B McGuigan 0–2, C Lawn 0–1, D McCrossan 0–1, G Cavlan 0–1, P Horisk 0–1. | | G McGonigle 1–3, K McCloy 0–1, P Bradley 0–1. | Referee: M Curley (Galway) |

| 25 May 2003 Quarter-final | Antrim | 2–9 – 1–10 | Cavan | Casement Park, Belfast |
| | D O’Hare 2–0, K Madden 0–5, K McGourty 0–2, J Quinn 0–1, S Kelly 0–1. | | D McCabe 1–5, M McKeever 0–1, L Reilly 0–1, F O’Reilly 0–1, S Brady 0–1, P Smith 0–1. | Referee: M Monaghan (Kildare) |

| 1 June 2003 Quarter-final | Fermanagh | 0–10 – 0–6 | Donegal | Brewster Park, Enniskillen |
| | Raymond Gallagher 0–4, R McCabe 0–4, S Maguire 0–2. | | A Sweeney 0–4, C McFadden 0–1, B Roper 0–1. | Referee: S McCormack (Meath) |

| 8 June 2003 Quarter-final | Down | 1–12 – 0–13 | Monaghan | Casement Park, Belfast |
| | L Doyle 0–4, M Walsh 1–0, G McCartan 0–3, J Lavery 0–2, C McCrickard 0–1, J McCartan 0–1, R Murtagh 0–1. | | P Finlay 0–7, J Hughes 0–1, T Freeman 0–1, M Slowey 0–1, R Ronaghan 0–1, R Woods 0–1, A Rooney 0–1. | Referee: E Murtagh (Longford) |

Semi-finals

| 15 June 2003 Semi-final | Tyrone | 1–17 – 1–9 | Antrim | Casement Park, Belfast |
| | P Canavan 0–7, E Mulligan 1–3, M Harte 0–3, S O’Neill 0–2, D McCrossan 0–1, G Cavlan 0–1. | | K Madden 1–5, K Brady 0–1, G Adams 0–1, D O’Hare 0–1, R O’Loan 0–1. | Referee: G Kinneavy (Roscommon) |

| 22 June 2003 Semi-final | Down | 2–10 – 0–11 | Fermanagh | St. Tiernach's Park, Clones |
| | G McCartan 1–4, J McCartan 1–0, L Doyle 0–3, B Coulter 0–1, C McCrickard 0–1, R Murtagh 0–1. | | Raymie Gallagher 0–4, R McCabe 0–3, R Keenan 0–2, S Maguire 0–1, C Bradley 0–1. | Referee: M Monaghan (Kildare) |

Finals

| 13 July 2003 Final | Tyrone | 1–17 – 4–8 | Down | St. Tiernach's Park, Clones |
| | P Canavan 1–6, E Mulligan 0–3, S Cavanagh 0–2, B Dooher 0–1, B McGuigan 0–1, K Hughes 0–1, C Gormley 0–1, P Jordan 0–1, C Gourley 0–1. | | D Gordon 2–1, L Doyle 1–4, B Coulter 1–1, G McCartan 0–1, B Burns 0–1. | Referee: A Mangan (Kerry) |

| 20 July 2003 Final replay | Tyrone | 0–23 – 1–5 | Down | St. Tiernach's Park, Clones |
| | P Canavan 0–11 (7f, 1’45’), E Mulligan 0–4, K Hughes 0–2, R McMenamin 0–1, C Gormley 0–1, S Cavanagh 0–1, B Dooher 0–1, G Cavlan 0–1, F McGuigan 0–1. | | L Doyle 0–4 (3f), R Murtagh 1–0, B Coulter 0–1. | Referee: B White (Wexford) |

=== Leinster Senior Football Championship ===
First round
Louth | 4–12
Wicklow | 2–07
Laois | 1–19
Wexford | 0–09
Carlow | 1–12
Westmeath | 1–17

Quarter-finals
Louth | 0–09
Dublin | 1–19
Laois | 2–10
Offaly | 0–13
Westmeath | 0–05
Meath | 1–11
Longford | 2–06
Kildare | 1–14

Semi-finals
Dublin | 0–14
Laois | 0–16
Meath | 1–11
Kildare | 0–15

Final
Laois | 2–13
Kildare | 1–13

First round

| 11 May 2003 First round | Louth | 4–12 – 2–7 | Wicklow | Croke Park, Dublin |
| | M Stanfield 2–3, JP Rooney 2–3, O McDonnell 0–4, N McDonnell 0–1, M Farrelly 0–1. | | B Ó hAnnaidh 1–0, A Nolan 1–0, T Gill 0–3, P Dalton 0–2, C Davis 0–1, P Cronin 0–1. | Referee: M Hughes (County Tyrone) |

| 11 May 2003 First round | Westmeath | 1–17 – 1–12 | Carlow | Croke Park, Dublin |
| | D Dolan 0–6, F Wilson 0–5, JP Casey 0–5, S Colleary 1–1. | | S Rea 0–4, W Minchin 1–0, fJ Nevin 0–2, M Carpenter 0–2, J Hayden 0–1, W Power 0–1, D Byrne 0–1, P Nolan 0–1. | Referee: A Mangan (Kerry) |

| 11 May 2003 First round | Laois | 1–19 – 0–10 | Wexford | Croke Park, Dublin |
| | B McDonald 0–6, R Munnelly 0–5, I Fitzgerald 1–1, M Lawlor 0–3, D Delaney 0–2, N Garvan 0–1, K Kelly 0–1. | | M Forde 0–4, D Murphy 0–1, W Carley 0–1, L O’Brien 0–1, S Doran 0–1, T Mahon 0–1, J Hegarty 0–1. | Referee: G Kinneavy (Roscommon) |

Quarter-finals

| 25 May 2003 Quarter-final | Laois | 1–12 – 1–12 | Offaly | O'Moore Park, Portlaoise |
| | C McManus 1–3, C Quinn 0–4, J Reynolds 0–3, P Kellaghan 0–1, N McNamee 0–1. | | M Lawlor 1–4, R Munnelly 0–3, D Delaney 0–2, A Fennelly 0–1, B McDonald 0–1, S Kelly 0–1. | Attendance: 15000; Referee: M Collins (Cork) |

| 25 May 2003 Quarter-final | Kildare | 1–14 – 2–6 | Longford | Cusack Park, Mullingar |
| | T Fennin 1–2, J Doyle 0–3, K Ennis 0–2, P Murray 0–2, R Sweeney 0–2, D McCormack 0–1, P Hurley 0–1, E McCormack 0–1. | | T Smullen 1–0, N Sheridan 1–0, P Davis 0–3, P Barden 0–2, P Ross 0–1. |

| 1 June 2003 Quarter-final | Dublin | 1–19 – 0–9 | Louth | Croke Park, Dublin |
| | A Brogan 1–0, R Cosgrove 0–3, T Quinn 0–3, B Cullen 0–3, C Whelan 0–3, D O'Callaghan 0–2, D Magee 0–1, D Henry 0–1, S Connell 0–1, T Mulligan 0–1, C Goggins 0–1. | | JP Rooney 0–4, M Farrelly 0–2, O McDonnell 0–2, M Stanfield 0–1. | Referee: P McEneaney (Monaghan) |

| 1 June 2003 Quarter-final | Meath | 2–13 – 2–13 | Westmeath | Croke Park, Dublin |
| | H Traynor 1–1, D Regan 0–4, G Geraghty 1–0, T Giles 0–3, D Crimmins 0–2, S McKeigue 0–2, E Kelly 0–1. | | D Dolan 1–7, S Colleary 1–2, J Fallon 0–4. | Referee: M Curley (Galway) |

| 2 June 2003 Quarter-final replay | Laois | 2–10 – 0–13 | Offaly | O'Connor Park, Tullamore |
| | I Fitzgerald 1–3, B McDonald 1–2, R Munnelly 0–2, P Clancy 0–1, N Garvan 0–1, G Kavanagh 0–1. | | C Quinn 0–5, B Mooney 0–2, N McNamee 0–2, P Kellaghan 0–2, J Greenan 0–1, C McManus 0–1. | Attendance: 800; Referee: B Crowe (Cavan) |

| 7 June 2003 Quarter-final replay | Meath | 1–11 – 0–5 | Westmeath | O'Moore Park, Portlaoise |
| | D Regan 0–6, D Crimmins 1–0, G Geraghty 0–2, J Cullinane 0–1, E Kelly 0–1, T Giles 0–1. | | M Ennis 0–2, F Wilson 0–2, M Flanagan 0–1. | Referee: B White (Wexford) |

Semi-finals

| 14 June 2003 Semi-final | Kildare | 0–15 – 1–11 | Meath | Croke Park, Dublin |
| | J Doyle 0–4, P Murray 0–3, R Sweeney 0–2, A Rainbow 0–2, T Fennin 0–2, A Barry 0–1, S McKenzie-Smith 0–1. | Report | T Giles 1–2, D Regan 0–5, H Traynor 0–2, C McCarthy 0–1, G Geraghty 0–1. | Referee: M Hughes (County Tyrone) |

| 15 June 2003 Semi-final | Laois | 0–16 – 0–14 | Dublin | Croke Park, Dublin |
| | D Delaney 0–4, R Munnelly 0–3, B McDonald 0–2, P Clancy 0–2, G Kavanagh 0–2, I Fitzgerald 0–2, M Lawlor 0–1, | Report | A Brogan 0–3, T Mulligan 0–3, T Quinn 0–3, R Cosgrove 0–2, C Moran 0–1, S Ryan 0–1, S Connell 0–1. | Attendance: 57,615; Referee: A Mangan (Kerry) |

Final

| 20 July 2003 Final | Laois | 2–13 – 1–13 | Kildare | Croke Park, Dublin |
| | B McDonald 1–2, R Munnelly 1–1, I Fitzgerald 0–4, T Kelly 0–2, P Clancy 0–1, G Kavanagh 0–1, B Brennan 0–1, D Miller 0–1. | | J Doyle 0–5 (4f), P Murray 0–4 (3f), R Sweeney 1–0 (pen), S McKenzie-Smith 0–2, G Ryan 0–1, P Brennan 0–1. | Referee: S McCormack (Meath) |

== Qualifiers ==
=== Round 1 ===
| 7 June 2003 Round 1 | Waterford | 0–8 – 2–21 | Armagh | Walsh Park, Waterford |
| | G Hurney 0–4, C Power 0–2, C O’Keeffe 0–1, M Power 0–1. | | O McConville 1–7, S McDonnell 1–4, D Marsden 0–3, P McKeever 0–3, B O’Hagan 0–1, A O’Rourke 0–1, P Loughran 0–1, J McEntee 0–1. | Referee: S Doyle (Wexford) |

| 7 June 2003 Round 1 | Wexford | 0–9 – 3–10 | Derry | Wexford Park, Wexford |
| | M Forde 0–5, R Barry 0–1, L O’Brien 0–1, J Hudson 0–1, J Hegarty 0–1. | | A Tohill 1–3, E Muldoon 1–0, D Dougan 1–0, P Bradley 0–2, SM Lockhart 0–1, D Crozier 0–1, G McGonagle 0–1, J McBride 0–1, M Harney 0–1. | Referee: J Geaney (Cork) |

| 7 June 2003 Round 1 | Donegal | 1–17 – 1–11 | Longford | MacCumhaill Park, Ballybofey |
| | A Sweeney 0–8, S McDermott 1–1, B Roper 0–3, C McFadden 0–3, M Hegarty 0–2. | | P Davis 0–5, L Keenan 0–4, N Sheridan 1–0, T Smullen 0–1, P Barden 0–1. | Referee: D Joyce (Galway) |

| 7 June 2003 Round 1 | Roscommon | 0–14 – 1–10 | Cork | Dr. Hyde Park, Roscommon |
| | F Dolan 0–6, G Lohan 0–3, G Cox 0–2, S O’Neill 0–1, J Dunning 0–1, K Mannion 0–1. | | C Corkery 0–4, E Sexton 1–0, M O’Cronin 0–3, BJ O’Sullivan 0–1, D Kavanagh 0–1, J O’Shea 0–1. | Referee: M Monahan (Kildare) |

| 7 June 2003 Round 1 | Carlow | 0–18 – 0–13 | Wicklow | Dr. Cullen Park, Carlow |
| | S Rea 0–5, J Nevin 0–4, M Carpenter 0–3, B Kelly 0–3, J Kavanagh 0–1, W Minchin 0–1, J McGrath 0–1. | | A Nolan 0–5, T Gill 0–3, P Dalton 0–1, D McGillycuddy 0–1, C Davis 0–1, B Flynn 0–1, D Ó hAnnaidh 0–1. | Referee: M Ryan (Limerick) |

| 7 June 2003 Round 1 | Offaly | 4–15 – 0–10 | London | O'Connor Park, Tullamore |
| | C McManus 3–0, C Quinn 0–6, S Grennan 1–0, J Reynolds 0–3, R Guinan 0–2, J Hurst 0–1, P Kellaghan 0–1, R Malone 0–1, V Claffey 0–1. | | C Foody 0–6, J Carmody 0–1, P Hehir 0–1, P Connolly 0–1, JP O’Donnell 0–1. | Referee: M Daly (Mayo) |

| 8 June 2003 Round 1 | Cavan | 1–12 – 2–7 | Louth | Páirc Tailteann, Navan |
| | L Reilly 1–3, D McCabe 0–6, G Pierson 0–2, P Brady 0–1. | | M Stanfield 1–1, P Keenan 1–0, JP Rooney 0–3, N McDonnell 0–3. | Referee: C Broderick (Down) |

| 14 June 2003 Round 1 | Monaghan | 0–14 – 1–9 | Westmeath | St. Tiernach's Park, Clones |
| | P Finlay 0–6, T Freeman 0–4, N Corrigan 0–2, E Lennon 0–1, R Ronaghan 0–1, | | D Dolan 0–4, G Dolan 1–0, M Flanagan 0–2, J Fallon 0–2, JP Casey 0–1. | Referee: P Russell (Tipperary) |

=== Round 2 ===
| 21 June 2003 Round 2 | Leitrim | 1–11 – 2–9 | Roscommon | Páirc Seán Mac Diarmada, Carrick-on-Shannon |
| | P McLoughlin 0–6, D Brennan 1–1, F McBrien 0–1, S Foley 0–1, C Carroll 0–1, S Canning 0–1. | | K Mannion 1–1, D O’Connor 1–0, F Dolan 0–3, D Connellan 0–2, J Dunning 0–1, G Lohan 0–1, N Dineen 0–1. | Referee: B Gorman (Armagh) |

| 21 June 2003 Round 2 | Antrim | 0–12 – 0–15 | Armagh | Casement Park, Belfast |
| | K Madden 0–9, J Quinn 0–1, M McCrory 0–1, G Adams 0–1. | | O McConville 0–7, S McDonnell 0–6, R Clarke 0–1, P McGrane 0–1. | Referee: J Bannon (Longford) |

| 21 June 2003 Round 2 | Clare | 1–8 – 1–12 | Offaly | Cusack Park, Ennis |
| | O O’Dwyer 1–5, M O’Dwyer 0–2, G Quinlan 0–1. | | N McNamee 1–1, C McManus 0–4, C Quinn 0–3, N Coughlan 0–3, P Kellaghan 0–1. | Referee: G Kinneavy (Roscommon) |

| 21 June 2003 Round 2 | Monaghan | 0–12 – 2–10 | Meath | St. Tiernach's Park, Clones |
| | R Woods 0–6, P Finlay 0–4, K Tavey 0–1, T Freeman 0–1. | | D Crimmins 1–2, G Geraghty 1–1, S McKeigue 0–2, T Giles 0–2, J Cullinane 0–1, D Regan 0–1, E Kelly 0–1. | Referee: M Collins (Cork) |

| 21 June 2003 Round 2 | Tipperary | 1–14 – 0–13 | Carlow | Semple Stadium, Thurles |
| | D Browne 1–9, A Fitzgerald 0–2, T Doyle 0–1, F O’Callaghan 0–1, E Hanrahan 0–1. | | B Kelly 0–5, S Rea 0–4, D Byrne 0–1, J Kavanagh 0–1, M Brennan 0–1, P Nolan 0–1. | Referee: M Daly (Mayo) |

| 22 June 2003 Round 2 | Donegal | 0–16 – 0–11 | Sligo | MacCumhaill Park, Ballybofey |
| | A Sweeney 0–7, S McDermott 0–3, M Hegarty 0–2, J Haran 0–2, J McGuinness 0–1, B Roper 0–1. | | D Sloyan 0–5, D Durkin 0–1, J McPartland 0–1, E O’Hara 0–1, K Quinn 0–1, M McNamara 0–1, G McGowan 0–1. | Referee: B White (Wexford) |

| 28 June 2003 Round 2 | Dublin | 3–9 – 1–9 | Derry | St. Tiernach's Park, Clones |
| | J Sherlock 1–3, S Connell 1–1, D Farrell 1–1, R Cosgrove 0–2, C Whelan 0–1, D Homan 0–1. | | P Bradley 1–2, G McGonigle 0–3, D Crozier 0–1, A Tohill 0–1, E Muldoon 0–1, P O’Kane 0–1. | Referee: B White (Wexford) |

| 29 June 2003 Round 2 | Fermanagh | 0–16 – 1–10 | Cavan | Brewster Park, Enniskillen |
| | R Gallagher 0–6, J Sherry 0–2, R Keenan 0–2, R McCabe 0–2, C Bradley 0–2, S Maguire 0–1, M McGrath 0–1. | | D McCabe 0–6, J Reilly 1–0, L Reilly 0–3, P McKenna 0–1. | Referee: P McEneaney (Monaghan) |

=== Round 3 ===
| 5 July 2003 Round 3 | Donegal | 2–19 – 0–15 | Tipperary | Croke Park, Dublin |
| | B Devenney 1–4, B Roper 1–3, A Sweeney 0–5, S McDermott 0–3, M Hegarty 0–3, C McFadden 0–1. | | D Browne 0–9, D O’Brien 0–2, E Hanrahan 0–2, N Fitzgerald 0–1, F O’Callaghan 0–1. | Referee: P Fox (Westmeath) |

| 5 July 2003 Round 3 | Armagh | 0–15 – 0–11 | Dublin | Croke Park, Dublin |
| | S McDonnell 0–5, J McEntee 0–4, D Marsden 0–2, P McKeever 0–1, P McGrane 0–1, O McConville 0–1, R Clarke 0–1. | | R Cosgrove 0–5, J Sherlock 0–2, D Farrell 0–2, D Homan 0–1, S Connell 0–1. | Referee: P McEneaney (Monaghan) |

| 5 July 2003 Round 3 | Roscommon | 1–20 – 1–15 (aet) | Offaly | Cusack Park, Mullingar |
| | F Dolan 0–12, G Lohan 1–1, S O’Neill 0–2, S Lohan 0–2, D Connellan 0–1, K Mannion 0–1, J Tiernan 0–1. | | C Quinn 0–7, P Kellaghan 1–0, N Coughlan 0–2, F Cullen 0–1, K Slattery 0–1, C McManus 0–1, P Mulhare 0–1, J Reynolds 0–1, N McNamee 0–1. | Attendance: 10000; Referee: M McGrath (Donegal) |

| 6 July 2003 Round 3 | Fermanagh | 1–12 – 0–9 | Meath | St. Tiernach's Park, Clones |
| | Raymond Gallagher 1–5, T Brewster 0–3, K Donnelly 0–2, R Keenan 0–1, J Sherry 0–1. | | R Magee 0–2, T Giles 0–2, N Crawford 0–1, H Traynor 0–1, C McCarthy 0–1, R Kealy 0–1, G Geraghty 0–1. | Referee: P Russell (Tipperary) |

=== Round 4 ===
| 19 July 2003 Round 4 | Fermanagh | 0–12 – 1–8 | Mayo | Markievicz Park, Sligo |
| | S Maguire 0–3, T Brewster 0–3, Ray Gallagher 0–2, C O’Reilly 0–2, J Sherry 0–1, R McCabe 0–1. | | M Sheridan 0–5, T Mortimer 1–1, B Maloney 0–2. | Referee: J Geaney (Cork) |

| 20 July 2003 Round 4 | Armagh | 4–10 – 0–11 | Limerick | Dr. Hyde Park, Roscommon |
| | S McDonnell 3–4 (2f), R Clarke 1–2, O McConville 0–3 (3f), J Toal 0–1. | | M Gavin 0–9 (7f, 1 ‘45’), S Kelly 0–1, C Fitzgerald 0–1. | Referee: J Bannon (Longford) |

| 26 July 2003 Round 4 | Donegal | 3–15 – 2–10 | Down | St. Tiernach's Park, Clones |
| | A Sweeney (0–6), S McDermott (1–1), C Toye (1–1), M Hegarty (1–1), B Devenney (0–4), B Roper (0–1), J Gildea (0–1). | | R Sexton (1–1), Shane Ward (1–0), L Doyle (0–2), B Grant (0–2), J Clarke (0–1), M Walsh (0–1), B Coulter (0–1), D Hughes (0–1), R Murtagh (0–1). | Referee: G Kinneavy (Roscommon) |

| 26 July 2003 Round 4 | Roscommon | 1–18 – 0–19 (aet) | Kildare | O'Moore Park, Portlaoise |
| | F Dolan (0–13), J Tiernan (1–0), K Mannion (0–3), G Lohan (0–1), J Dunning (0–1). | | P Brennan (0–6), P Murray (0–6), J Doyle (0–2), P Hurley (0–2), T Fennin (0–2), T Rossiter (0–1). | Referee: M Collins (Cork) |

== All-Ireland ==
The provincial champions and the winners of round 4 contested the quarter-finals. The quarter final matches would be between a provincial champion and a round 4 winner.

Quarter-finals
Donegal | 0–14
Galway | 0–11
Armagh | 0–15
Laois | 0–13
Kerry | 1–21
Roscommon | 3–10
Tyrone | 1–21
Fermanagh | 0–05

Semi-finals
Donegal | 1–09
Armagh | 2–10
Kerry | 0–06
Tyrone | 0–13

Final
Armagh | 0–09
Tyrone | 0–12

Quarter-finals

| 3 August 2003 Quarter-final | Tyrone | 1–21 – 0–5 | Fermanagh | Croke Park, Dublin |
| | S Cavanagh 1–2, P Canavan 0–4, O Mulligan 0–4, C G Cavlan 0–3, E McGinley 0–2, K Hughes 0–2, B Dooher 0–1, B McGuigan 0–1, Gormley 0–1, C Gourty 0–1. | | T Brewster 0–2, K Donnelly 0–1, K O'Reilly 0–1, S Doherty 0–1. | Referee: P McEneaney (Monaghan) |

| 3 August 2003 Quarter-final | Armagh | 0–15 – 0–13 | Laois | Croke Park, Dublin |
| | O McConville 0–7, D Marsden 0–2, S McDonnell 0–1, P Loughran 0–1, R Clarke 0–1, A O'Rourke 0–1, A McCann 0–1, J McEntee 0–1. | | B McDonald 0–6, G Kavanagh 0–4, D Rooney 0–1, N Garvan 0–1, M Lalor 0–1. | Referee: G Kinneavy (Roscommon) |

| 4 August 2003 Quarter-final | Galway | 1–11 – 0–14 | Donegal | Croke Park, Dublin |
| | M Meehan 1–1, P Joyce 0–4, P Clancy 0–2, K Walsh 0–2, D Savage 0–1, D Meehan 0–1. | | B Devenney 0–5, A Sweeney 0–3, P McGonigle 0–2, J Haran 0–1, B Roper 0–1, K Cassidy 0–1, M Hegarty 0–1. | Referee: M Collins (Cork) |

| 4 August 2003 Quarter-final | Kerry | 1–21 – 3–10 | Roscommon | Croke Park, Dublin |
| | D Ó Cinnéide 0–8, D O'Sullivan 1–2, C Cooper 0–4, S O'Sullivan 0–2, L Hassett 0–2, MF Russell 0–2, J Crowley 0–1. | | F Dolan 1–3, G Cox 1–2, K Mannion 1–0, S Lohan 0–3, P Noone 0–1, S O'Neill 0–1. |

| 10 August 2003 Quarter-final replay | Galway | 0–11 – 0–14 | Donegal | McHale Park, Castlebar |
| | M Donnellan 0–3, M Meehan 0–2, K Walsh 0–2, P Joyce 0–2, P Clancy 0–1, D Savage 0–1. | | B Devenney 0–5, A Sweeney 0–4, C Toye 0–2, M Hegarty 0–2, |

Semi-finals

| 24 August 2003 Semi-final | Kerry | 0–6 – 0–13 | Tyrone | Croke Park, Dublin |
| | D Quill 0–2, C Cooper 0–1, M Ó Sé 0–1, D Ó Cinnéide 0–1, D O'Sullivan 0–1. | | O Mulligan 0–3, S O'Neill 0–3, B McGuigan 0–2, E McGinley 0–1, P Canavan 0–1, R McMenamin 0–1, S Cavanagh 0–1, B Dooher 0–1. | Referee: G Kinneavy (Roscommon) |

| 31 August 2003 Semi-final | Armagh | 2–10 – 1–9 | Donegal | Croke Park, Dublin |
| | O McConville 1–5, S McDonnell 1–1, P McKeever 0–1, P Loughran 0–1, P McGrane 0–1, D Marsden 0–1. | | C Toye 1–1, A Sweeney 0–4, B Devenney 0–3, B Roper 0–1. | Attendance: 76,321; Referee: M Monahan (Donegal) |

Final

| 28 September 2003 Final | Tyrone | 0–12 – 0–09 | Armagh | Croke Park, Dublin |
| | P Canavan 0–5, all frees, O Mulligan, two frees, S O’Neill 0–2 each, B McGuigan, G Cavlan, E McGinley 0–1 each. | | O McConville 0–3, all frees, P McKeever 0–2, two frees, S McDonnell 0–2, D Marsden, J McEntee 0–1 each. | Attendance: 79,391; Referee: B White (Wexford) |

== Championship statistics ==
=== Top scorers ===
Overall

| Rank | Player | County | Tally | Total | Matches | Average |
|---|---|---|---|---|---|---|
| 1 | Peter Canavan | Tyrone | 1–48 | 51 | 8 | 6.37 |
| 2 | Frankie Dolan | Roscommon | 1–38 | 41 | 6 | 6.83 |
| 2 | Adrian Sweeney | Donegal | 0–41 | 41 | 8 | 5.12 |
| 4 | Steven McDonnell | Armagh | 5–25 | 40 | 8 | 5.00 |
| 4 | Declan Browne | Tipperary | 2–34 | 40 | 4 | 10.00 |
| 6 | Oisín McConville | Armagh | 2–33 | 39 | 8 | 4.87 |
| 7 | Muiris Gavin | Limerick | 0–27 | 27 | 4 | 6.75 |
| 8 | Brian McDonald | Laois | 2–19 | 25 | 6 | 4.16 |
| 8 | Paul Finlay | Monaghan | 0–25 | 25 | 4 | 6.25 |
| 8 | Colm Quinn | Offaly | 0–25 | 25 | 5 | 5.00 |

Single game

| Rank | Player | County | Tally | Total | Opposition |
|---|---|---|---|---|---|
| 1 | Steven McDonnell | Armagh | 3–4 | 13 | Limerick |
| 1 | Frankie Dolan | Roscommon | 0–13 | 13 | Kildare |
| 3 | Declan Browne | Tipperary | 1–9 | 12 | Carlow |
| 3 | Frankie Dolan | Roscommon | 0–12 | 12 | Kildare |
| 5 | Declan Browne | Tipperary | 0–11 | 11 | Waterford |
| 5 | Peter Canavan | Tyrone | 0–11 | 11 | Down |
| 7 | Dessie Dolan | Westmeath | 1–7 | 10 | Meath |
| 7 | Oisín McConville | Armagh | 1–7 | 10 | Waterford |
| 9 | Ciaran McManus | Offaly | 3–0 | 9 | London |
| 9 | Mark Stanfield | Louth | 2–3 | 9 | Wicklow |
| 9 | J. P. Rooney | Louth | 2–3 | 9 | Wicklow |
| 9 | Dara Ó Cinnéide | Kerry | 1–6 | 9 | Limerick |
| 9 | Paddy Bradley | Derry | 1–6 | 9 | Tyrone |
| 9 | Peter Canavan | Tyrone | 1–6 | 9 | Down |
| 9 | Muiris Gavin | Limerick | 0–9 | 9 | Cork |
| 9 | Kevin Madden | Antrim | 0–9 | 9 | Armagh |
| 9 | Declan Browne | Tipperary | 0–9 | 9 | Donegal |
| 9 | Muiris Gavin | Limerick | 0–9 | 9 | Armagh |

=== Miscellaneous ===
- Limerick beat Cork for the first time since 1965.
- The first Munster championship meeting between Limerick and Clare since 1988.
- Laois won their first Leinster title in 57 years for the first time since 1981 neither Dublin or Meath reached the Leinster final.
- Tyrone won their first All Ireland title marketing a historic 6th breakthrough of Ulster counties hitting the "Roll of Honor" after Cavan 1933, 1935, 1947, 1948, 1952, Down 1960, 1961, 1968, 1991, 1994 Donegal in 1992, Derry in 1993 & Armagh in 2002
- Dublin lost in the third round qualifiers; as of 2024 this is the only time since qualifiers were introduced in 2001 that Dublin did not reach the quarter-final stage or better.
