= Feargal Logan =

Irish Gaelic footballer and manager

Feargal Charles Logan
Personal information
- Born: County Tyrone, Northern Ireland
- Occupation: Solicitor
- Height: 6 ft 2 in (1.88 m)

Sport
- Sport: Gaelic football
- Position: Midfield
Club
- Years: Club
- Stewartstown Harps
Inter-county
- Years: County
- ?-? 2013-2020 2020–2024: Tyrone senior team (Player); Tyrone under-21 team (Manager); Tyrone senior team (Manager)
Inter-county titles
- Ulster titles: 2
- All-Irelands: 1 (As manager)

Feargal Logan is a Gaelic football manager and former player, who was a starting member of the Tyrone county team that reached the 1995 All-Ireland Senior Football Championship final.

== Legal career ==
Since retiring from play, Logan's name has become more known in GAA circles for his work as a lawyer, representing players in disciplinary hearings, most famously reducing Ryan McMenamin's suspension in 2005 to allow him to play the crunch quarter final game against Dublin, by pointing out that the Central Disciplinary Committee had no authority to use television footage when considering a player's punishment. This appeal set a precedent that allowed several other players to successfully revoke their suspensions, such as Armagh players, Kieran McKeever and Paul McGrane.

The Gaelic Players Association used Logan's legal abilities during its early years, as he drafted its articles of association.

== Managerial career ==
Logan was Tyrone under-21 manager and led the team to an All-Ireland title in 2015.

He was appointed senior co-manager (with Brian Dooher) of the Tyrone footballers in November 2020, succeeding Mickey Harte. Himself and Dooher left the role in August 2024.

== Honours ==
As player

Tyrone

- Ulster Senior Football Championship: (1)
  - 1995

Stewartstown Harps

- Tyrone Junior Football Championship: (1)
  - 2004
- Ulster Junior Club Football Championship: (1)
  - 2004

As manager

Tyrone

- Ulster Under-20 Football Championship: (1)
  - 2015
- All-Ireland Under-20 Football Championship: (1)
  - 2015
- Ulster Senior Football Championship: (1)
  - 2021
- All-Ireland Senior Football Championship: (1)
  - 2021

== Personal life ==
Logan has three children: two sons and a daughter, Conor Logan, Michael Logan and Marie Claire.
