= Charlie Redmond =

Dublin Gaelic footballer

Personal information
- Native name: Cathal Mac Réamainn (Irish)
- Born: 1963 or 1964 (age 62–63) Dublin, Ireland
- Occupation: Firefighter
- Height: 6 ft 0 in (183 cm)

Sport
- Sport: Gaelic football
- Position: Forward
Club
- Years: Club
- ?: Erin's Isle
Club titles
- Dublin titles: 2
- Leinster titles: 1
Inter-county**
Years	County	Apps (scores)
1983–?	Dublin	116 (15–306)
Inter-county titles
- Leinster titles: 7/8
- All-Irelands: 1
- All Stars: 3
- **Inter County team apps and scores correct as of (00:03, 6 September 2006 (UTC)).

Charles Redmond (born 1963/1964) is a Dublin-born former Gaelic footballer who played at senior level for the Dublin county team and current manager of Trinity Gaels seniors.

His notoriety within the game was secured during the 1995 All-Ireland Senior Football Championship final when he was sent off but refused to leave the field of play; as a result, the GAA introduced red and yellow cards to the sport. He missed Erin's Isle's club campaign as a result of the two sendings off.

== Playing career ==
Redmond received three All Stars for his performances with Dublin, in 1993, 1994 and in his only all-Ireland winning year with Dublin in 1995. He scored a goal in the 1995 All-Ireland SFC final win over Tyrone which ended on a scoreline of 1–10 to 0–12; later in the same game he was controversially sent off. He also was on Dublin's winning side when Dublin won the National Football League in 1991 against neighbouring side Kildare; the game finished on a scoreline of 1–9 to 0–10. His second National Football League title came in 1993 when Dublin beat Donegal 0–10 to 0–6 in the replay of the final. Redmond missed from the penalty spot on three critical occasions, the 1988 Leinster final and the 1992 and 1994 All-Ireland finals which made the goal in the 1995 final all the more precious. Redmond was on the panel when Dublin won the 1983 All-Ireland.

Redmond won two Dublin Senior Football Championship medals with Erin's Isle. He won the first in 1993 and, after appearing in the final on three occasions again, he finally won his second medal in 1997.

Sent off in the semi-final of the 1997–98 All-Ireland Senior Club Football Championship, Redmond was suspended his team's final loss to Corofin, which he had intended to be his last game as a player.

Redmond was a placed ball specialist. A clinical free kick taker for Dublin, he would often precede his kick by habitually licking his gloves three times and taking seven steps back and two to the left before running up to kick the ball. However, when tasked with taking an early penalty facing the Canal End in the 1992 All-Ireland SFC final, he fired the ball over the bar instead and caused heavy favourites Dublin to lose the game. He was then tasked with taking a penalty in front of Hill 16 in the 1994 All-Ireland SFC final. His effort was saved and Dublin lost again.

In 2007, the Irish language television station TG4 did a documentary on Charlie Redmond and his football career.

== Personal life ==
Redmond is a firefighter by profession and has featured in the Dublin fire brigade Halloween health and safety campaign. His wife Grainne died of cancer in December 2016.
