= Gerard Cavlan =

Irish Gaelic footballer

Personal information
- Born: 2 April 1976 (age 50) County Tyrone, Northern Ireland
- Height: 6 ft 1 in (185 cm)

Sport
- Sport: Gaelic football
- Position: Half Forward
Club
- Years: Club
- ?-present: Dungannon Thomas Clarkes
Inter-county
- Years: County
- 1993-2007: Tyrone
Inter-county titles
- Ulster titles: 5
- All-Irelands: 1
- NFL: 2
- All Stars: 0

Gerard Cavlan is an Irish former Gaelic footballer who played for the Tyrone county team. He was part of the team that won the All-Ireland Senior Football Championship in 2003.

He made his senior debut in 1993 against Wexford, at the age of 17.

Cavlan represented Ireland in the 2000 International Rules Series against Australia. His breakthrough year was in 1996 during Tyrone's march to the All-Ireland semi final, and he scored six points in that match.

In 2006, shortly after Tyrone were knocked out of the All-Ireland championship early, Cavlan was one of several Tyrone players who took up the option to play for an American GAA club.

In the 2007 Ulster Championship first round, Cavlan came on as a substitute, and scored an injury time free kick to win the game for Tyrone, against their neighbours, Fermanagh.

== Outside football ==
Cavlan was embroiled in off-field controversy in April 2006, when the Ulster Society for the Prevention of Cruelty to Animals (USPCA) seized a dangerous dog from Cavlan's Dungannon home, suspected of being used for dogfighting. The dog (Cannon Ball) was found in a healthy state but with large amounts of scarring, Cavlan maintained that he did not own the dog, or condone dog fighting.

On 23 April 2007 Cavlan changed his plea to guilty and was fined £650, banned for five years from owning a terrier-type dog and ordered to pay costs of £4,300. A BBC Spotlight investigation screened on 30 August 2007 claimed Cavlan was a "ringleader" in a major dog fighting operation. The report claimed that Cavlan was a senior member of The Bulldog Sanctuary Kennels, operating in Tyrone. A BBC undercover reporter infiltrated another operation called the Farmers Boys in Armagh, which had links to Cavlan. In the programme Cavlan was filmed stating he had a dozen or fifteen pit bulls, and stated of one dog "Sure he had him in the chest, and he shook him and he shook him for 25 minutes... if he hadn't got you killed in half an hour... he was in trouble, you know. A real hard mouthed dog." Cavlan was also filmed discussing plans to retrieve Cannon Ball from the British Army's Palace Barracks, where the dog was being held on behalf of the USPCA.

Cavlan was later dropped from the Tyrone panel.
