= Pascal Canavan =

Irish Gaelic footballer

Personal information
- Occupation: Teacher

Sport
- Sport: Gaelic football
Club
- Years: Club
- Errigal Ciarán

Pascal Canavan is a former Gaelic footballer who played for the Tyrone County team. He played in Tyrone's second All-Ireland Final appearance in 1995 and captained Errigal Ciaran in 2002. He retired from inter-county football in 2002, following Tyrone's success in the National Football League.

Pascal was a Religious Education teacher at St Ciaran's High School in Ballygawley. He has often been involved in GAA within the school as the under-18 manager, his greatest achievement with St Ciarans was winning the All-Ireland with his co-manager Brendan Traynor. Following their success as joint managers with St Ciaran's they now are joint managers of the Buncrana GAA club in Donegal. They got them promoted to Senior and are doing very well.

His younger brother is Tyrone's most successful individual player, Peter Canavan.

He is now the manager of Armagh Division 1A champions Armagh Harps

== Honours ==
Club

- Tyrone Senior Football Championship (6): 1993, 1994, 1997, 2000, 2002, 2006
- Ulster Senior Club Football Championship (2): 1992, 2002

County

- Ulster Senior Football Championship (3): 1995, 1996, 2001
- National Football League (1): Division 1 2002

Awards

- Irish News Ulster All-Star (1): 1996
