= Adrian Cush =

Irish Gaelic footballer

Personal information
- Born: 12 May 1970 (age 56) Tyrone, Northern Ireland
- Height: 5 ft 10 in (1.78 m)

Sport
- Sport: Gaelic football
- Position: Half Forward Line
Club
- Years: Club
- 1987 - 2007: Donaghmore St Patrick's
Inter-county
- Years: County
- 1988-1999: Tyrone
Inter-county titles
- Ulster titles: 2
- All-Irelands: 0

Adrian Cush (born 12 June 1970) is a former Gaelic footballer who played for the Donaghmore St Patrick's club and the Tyrone county team. He was part of the panel that played in Tyrone's second ever All-Ireland Final in 1995, and experienced success on the underage scene.

As his career took him to London, he had to stutter his playing for Tyrone, despite being at the top of his game.

Also known as Cushy the king. Part of the double act ‘the terrible twins’ alongside Peter the great Canavan

Adrian Cush managed Magherafelt O'Donnovan Rossa to their first Derry Senior Championship in over 40 years in 2019 alongside fellow Donaghmore man Paul Quinn & Dungannon native James Slater. They also led Magherafelt to their first ever u21 Championship & the clubs first ever reserve championship, following it up with another reserve championship a year later.
