= List of All Stars Awards winners (football) =

This is a list of all past winners of the official GAA GPA All Stars Awards in Gaelic football since the first awards in 1971. As an insight to the prominent players of the 1960s, it also includes the unofficial "Cuchulainn" awards presented from 1963 to 1967 under the auspices of Gaelic Weekly magazine.

For each year since 1995, when the official award began, the All Stars Footballer of the Year is highlighted with ^{FOTY}. If the footballer of the year did not win an All Star Award, his name is added to the list as FOTY. The unofficial Texaco Footballer of the Year, awarded since 1958, is a guide to the leading players of the past.

== Overview ==
By the end of 2020, nearly 400 different footballers had received awards. For those with the highest numbers of awards, see GAA GPA All Stars Awards.

As of 2024, the players are from the following teams:

Given as • Team, team's overall total/number of different players to have won while representing this team:

- Kerry, 167/66 (list)
- Dublin, 146/67 (list)
- Cork, 64/42 (list)
- Tyrone, 58/33 (list)
- Mayo, 54/33 (list)
- Meath, 49/27 (list)
- Galway, 48/34 (list)
- Donegal, 40/27 (list)
- Offaly, 30/19 (list)
- Armagh, 31/21 (list)
- Derry, 29/19 (list)
- Down, 23/18 (list)
- Roscommon, 16/12 (list)
- Kildare, 15/12 (list)
- Monaghan, 14/10 (list)
- Westmeath, 5/4
- Laois, 5/5
- Cavan, 5/5
- Fermanagh, 4/3
- Tipperary, 4/3
- Sligo, 4/4
- Louth, 3/3
- Leitrim, 2/2
- Antrim, 1
- Wicklow, 1
- Clare, 1
- Wexford, 1

No player has received an All Star while representing Carlow, Kilkenny**, Limerick, Longford, Waterford, or the overseas county teams of London and New York in football.

** Kilkenny no longer competes in the All-Ireland Senior Football Championship.

== 1970s ==
=== 1971 ===
Pos.	Player	Team	Appearances
GK	P. J. Smyth	Galway	1
RCB	Johnny Carey	Mayo	1
FB	Jack Cosgrove	Galway	1
LCB	Donie O'Sullivan	Kerry	1
RWB	Eugene Mulligan	Offaly	1
CB	Nicholas Clavin	Offaly	1
LWB	Patrick Reynolds	Meath	1
MD	Liam Sammon	Galway	1
MD	Willie Bryan	Offaly	1
RWF	Tony McTague	Offaly	1
CF	Ray Cummins	Cork	1
LWF	Mickey Kearins	Sligo	1
RCF	Andy McCallin	Antrim	1
FF	Seán O'Neill	Down	1
LCF	Seamus Leydon	Galway	1

County breakdown

- Galway = 4
- Offaly = 4
- Mayo = 1
- Kerry = 1
- Meath = 1
- Cork = 1
- Sligo = 1
- Antrim = 1
- Down = 1

=== 1972 ===
Pos.	Player	Team	Appearances
GK	Martin Furlong	Offaly	1
RCB	Mick Ryan	Offaly	1
FB	Paddy McCormack	Offaly	1
LCB	Donie O'Sullivan	Kerry	2
RWB	Brian McEniff	Donegal	1
CB	Tommy Joe Gilmore	Galway	1
LWB	Kevin Jer O'Sullivan	Cork	1
MD	Willie Bryan	Offaly	2
MD	Mick O'Connell	Kerry	1
RWF	Johnny Cooney	Offaly	1
CF	Kevin Kilmurray	Offaly	1
LWF	Tony McTague	Offaly	2
RCF	Mickey Freyne	Roscommon	1
FF	Seán O'Neill	Down	2
LCF	Paddy Moriarty	Armagh	1

Player has previously been selected.

County breakdown

- Offaly = 7
- Kerry = 2
- Donegal = 1
- Galway = 1
- Cork = 1
- Roscommon = 1
- Down = 1
- Armagh = 1

=== 1973 ===
Pos.	Player	Team	Appearances
GK	Billy Morgan	Cork	1
RCB	Frank Cogan	Cork	1
FB	Mick Ryan	Offaly	2
LCB	Brian Murphy	Cork	1
RWB	Liam O'Neill	Galway	1
CB	Tommy Joe Gilmore	Galway	2
LWB	Kevin Jer O'Sullivan	Cork	2
MD	John O'Keeffe	Kerry	1
MD	Dinny Long	Cork	1
RWF	Johnny Cooney	Offaly	2
CF	Kevin Kilmurray	Offaly	2
LWF	Liam Sammon	Galway	2
RCF	Jimmy Barry-Murphy	Cork	1
FF	Ray Cummins	Cork	2
LCF	Anthony McGurk	Derry	1

Player has previously been selected.

County breakdown

- Cork = 7
- Offaly = 3
- Galway = 3
- Kerry = 1
- Derry = 1

=== 1974 ===
Pos.	Player	Team	Appearances
GK	Paddy Cullen	Dublin	1
RCB	Donal Monaghan	Donegal	1
FB	Seán Doherty	Dublin	1
LCB	Robbie Kelleher	Dublin	1
RWB	Paddy Reilly	Dublin	1
CB	Barnes Murphy	Sligo	1
LWB	Johnny Hughes	Galway	1
MD	Dermot Earley	Roscommon	1
MD	Paudie Lynch	Kerry	1
RWF	Tom Naughton	Galway	1
CF	Declan Barron	Cork	1
LWF	David Hickey	Dublin	1
RCF	Jimmy Barry-Murphy	Cork	2
FF	Jimmy Keaveney	Dublin	1
LCF	John Tobin	Galway	1

Player has previously been selected.

County breakdown

- Dublin = 6
- Galway = 3
- Cork = 2
- Donegal = 1
- Sligo = 1
- Roscommon = 1
- Kerry = 1

=== 1975 ===
Pos.	Player	Team	Appearances
GK	Paudie O'Mahony	Kerry	1
RCB	Gay O'Driscoll	Dublin	1
FB	John O'Keeffe	Kerry	2
LCB	Robbie Kelleher	Dublin	2
RWB	Peter Stevenson	Derry	1
CB	Anthony McGurk	Derry	2
LWB	Ger Power	Kerry	1
MD	Dinny Long	Cork	2
MD	Colm McAlarney	Down	1
RWF	Gerry McElhinney	Derry	1
CF	Ken Rennicks	Meath	1
LWF	Mickey O'Sullivan	Kerry	1
RCF	John Egan	Kerry	1
FF	Mattie Kerrigan	Meath	1
LCF	Anton O'Toole	Dublin	1

Player has previously been selected.

County breakdown

- Kerry = 5
- Dublin = 3
- Derry = 3
- Meath = 2
- Cork = 1
- Down = 1

=== 1976 ===
Pos.	Player	Team	Appearances
GK	Paddy Cullen	Dublin	2
RCB	Ger O'Keeffe	Kerry	1
FB	John O'Keeffe	Kerry	3
LCB	Brian Murphy	Cork	2
RWB	Johnny Hughes	Galway	2
CB	Kevin Moran	Dublin	1
LWB	Ger Power	Kerry	2
MD	Brian Mullins	Dublin	1
MD	Dave McCarthy	Cork	1
RWF	Anton O'Toole	Dublin	2
CF	Tony Hanahoe	Dublin	1
LWF	David Hickey	Dublin	2
RCF	Bobby Doyle	Dublin	1
FF	Mikey Sheehy	Kerry	1
LCF	Pat Spillane	Kerry	1

Player has previously been selected.

County breakdown

- Dublin = 7
- Kerry = 5
- Cork = 2
- Galway = 1

=== 1977 ===
Pos.	Player	Team	Appearances
GK	Paddy Cullen	Dublin	3
RCB	Gay O'Driscoll	Dublin	2
FB	Pat Lindsay	Roscommon	1
LCB	Robbie Kelleher	Dublin	3
RWB	Tommy Drumm	Dublin	1
CB	Paddy Moriarty	Armagh	2
LWB	Pat O'Neill	Dublin	1
MD	Brian Mullins	Dublin	2
MD	Joe Kernan	Armagh	1
RWF	Anton O'Toole	Dublin	3
CF	Jimmy Smyth	Armagh	1
LWF	Pat Spillane	Kerry	2
RCF	Bobby Doyle	Dublin	2
FF	Jimmy Keaveney	Dublin	2
LCF	John Egan	Kerry	2

Player has previously been selected.

County breakdown

- Dublin = 9
- Armagh = 3
- Kerry = 2
- Roscommon = 1

=== 1978 ===
Pos.	Player	Team	Appearances
GK	Ollie Crinnigan	Kildare	1
RCB	Harry Keegan	Roscommon	1
FB	John O'Keeffe	Kerry	4
LCB	Robbie Kelleher	Dublin	4
RWB	Tommy Drumm	Dublin	2
CB	Ollie Brady	Cavan	1
LWB	Paudie Lynch	Kerry	2
MD	Colm McAlarney	Down	2
MD	Tomás O'Connor	Offaly	1
RWF	Ger Power	Kerry	3
CF	Declan Barron	Cork	2
LWF	Pat Spillane	Kerry	3
RCF	Mikey Sheehy	Kerry	2
FF	Jimmy Keaveney	Dublin	3
LCF	John Egan	Kerry	3

Player has previously been selected.

County breakdown

- Kerry = 6
- Dublin = 3
- Kildare = 1
- Roscommon = 1
- Cavan = 1
- Down = 1
- Offaly = 1
- Cork = 1

=== 1979 ===
Pos.	Player	Team	Appearances
GK	Paddy Cullen	Dublin	4
RCB	Eugene Hughes	Monaghan	1
FB	John O'Keeffe	Kerry	5
LCB	Tom Heneghan	Roscommon	1
RWB	Tommy Drumm	Dublin	3
CB	Tim Kennelly	Kerry	1
LWB	Danny Murray	Roscommon	1
MD	Dermot Earley	Roscommon	2
MD	Bernard Brogan	Dublin	1
RWF	Ger Power	Kerry	4
CF	Seán Walsh	Kerry	1
LWF	Pat Spillane	Kerry	4
RCF	Mikey Sheehy	Kerry	3
FF	Seán Lowry	Offaly	1
LCF	Joe McGrath	Mayo	1

Player has previously been selected.

County breakdown

- Kerry = 6
- Dublin = 3
- Roscommon = 3
- Monaghan = 1
- Offaly = 1
- Mayo = 1

== 1980s ==
=== 1980 ===
Pos.	Player	Team	Appearances
GK	Charlie Nelligan	Kerry	1
RCB	Harry Keegan	Roscommon	2
FB	Kevin Kehilly	Cork	1
LCB	Gerry Connellan	Roscommon	1
RWB	Kevin McCabe	Tyrone	1
CB	Tim Kennelly	Kerry	2
LWB	Danny Murray	Roscommon	2
MD	Jack O'Shea	Kerry	1
MD	Colum McKinstry	Armagh	1
RWF	Ger Power	Kerry	5
CF	Dinny Allen	Cork	1
LWF	Pat Spillane	Kerry	5
RCF	Matt Connor	Offaly	1
FF	Eoin Liston	Kerry	1
LCF	John Egan	Kerry	4

Player has previously been selected.

County breakdown

- Kerry = 7
- Roscommon = 3
- Cork = 2
- Tyrone = 1
- Armagh = 1
- Offaly = 1

=== 1981 ===
Pos.	Player	Team	Appearances
GK	Martin Furlong	Offaly	2
RCB	Jimmy Deenihan	Kerry	1
FB	Paddy Kennedy	Down	1
LCB	Paudie Lynch	Kerry	3
RWB	Páidí Ó Sé	Kerry	1
CB	Richie Connor	Offaly	1
LWB	Séamus McHugh	Galway	1
MD	Jack O'Shea	Kerry	2
MD	Seán Walsh	Kerry	2
RWF	Barry Brennan	Galway	1
CF	Denis 'Ogie' Moran	Kerry	1
LWF	Pat Spillane	Kerry	6
RCF	Mikey Sheehy	Kerry	4
FF	Eoin Liston	Kerry	2
LCF	Brendan Lowry	Offaly	1

Player has previously been selected.

County breakdown

- Kerry = 9
- Offaly = 3
- Galway = 2
- Down = 1

=== 1982 ===
Pos.	Player	Team	Appearances
GK	Martin Furlong	Offaly	3
RCB	Mick Fitzgerald	Offaly	1
FB	Liam O'Connor	Offaly	1
LCB	Kevin Kehilly	Cork	2
RWB	Páidí Ó Sé	Kerry	2
CB	Seán Lowry	Offaly	2
LWB	Liam Currams	Offaly	1
MD	Jack O'Shea	Kerry	3
MD	Pádraig Dunne	Offaly	1
RWF	Peter McGinnity	Fermanagh	1
CF	Joe Kernan	Armagh	2
LWF	Matt Connor	Offaly	2
RCF	Mikey Sheehy	Kerry	5
FF	Eoin Liston	Kerry	3
LCF	John Egan	Kerry	5

Player has previously been selected.

County breakdown

- Offaly = 7
- Kerry = 5
- Cork = 1
- Fermanagh = 1
- Armagh = 1

=== 1983 ===
Pos.	Player	Team	Appearances
GK	Martin Furlong	Offaly	4
RCB	Páidí Ó Sé	Kerry	3
FB	Stephen Kinneavy	Galway	1
LCB	John Evans	Cork	1
RWB	Pat Canavan	Dublin	1
CB	Tommy Drumm	Dublin	4
LWB	Jimmy Kerrigan	Cork	1
MD	Jack O'Shea	Kerry	4
MD	Liam Austin	Down	1
RWF	Barney Rock	Dublin	1
CF	Matt Connor	Offaly	3
LWF	Greg Blaney	Down	1
RCF	Martin McHugh	Donegal	1
FF	Colm O'Rourke	Meath	1
LCF	Joe McNally	Dublin	1

Player has previously been selected.

County breakdown

- Dublin = 4
- Kerry = 2
- Offaly = 2
- Cork = 2
- Down = 2
- Galway = 1
- Donegal = 1
- Meath = 1

=== 1984 ===
Pos.	Player	Team	Appearances
GK	John O'Leary	Dublin	1
RCB	Páidí Ó Sé	Kerry	4
FB	Mick Lyons	Meath	1
LCB	Séamus McHugh	Galway	2
RWB	Tommy Doyle	Kerry	1
CB	Tom Spillane	Kerry	1
LWB	P. J. Buckley	Dublin	1
MD	Jack O'Shea	Kerry	5
MD	Eugene McKenna	Tyrone	1
RWF	Barney Rock	Dublin	2
CF	Eoin Liston	Kerry	4
LWF	Pat Spillane	Kerry	7
RCF	Mikey Sheehy	Kerry	6
FF	Frank McGuigan	Tyrone	1
LCF	Dermot McNicholl	Derry	1

Player has previously been selected.

County breakdown

- Kerry = 7
- Dublin = 3
- Tyrone = 2
- Meath = 1
- Galway = 1
- Derry = 1

=== 1985 ===
Pos.	Player	Team	Appearances
GK	John O'Leary	Dublin	2
RCB	Páidí Ó Sé	Kerry	5
FB	Gerry Hargan	Dublin	1
LCB	Mick Spillane	Kerry	1
RWB	Tommy Doyle	Kerry	2
CB	Ciarán Murray	Monaghan	1
LWB	Dermot Flanagan	Mayo	1
MD	Jack O'Shea	Kerry	6
MD	Willie Joe Padden	Mayo	1
RWF	Barney Rock	Dublin	3
CF	Tommy Conroy	Dublin	1
LWF	Pat Spillane	Kerry	8
RCF	Kevin McStay	Mayo	1
FF	Paul Earley	Roscommon	1
LCF	Eugene Hughes	Monaghan	2

Player has previously been selected.

County breakdown

- Kerry = 5
- Dublin = 4
- Mayo = 3
- Monaghan = 1
- Roscommon = 1

=== 1986 ===
Pos.	Player	Team	Appearances
GK	Charlie Nelligan	Kerry	2
RCB	Harry Keegan	Roscommon	3
FB	Mick Lyons	Meath	2
LCB	John Lynch	Tyrone	1
RWB	Tommy Doyle	Kerry	3
CB	Tom Spillane	Kerry	2
LWB	Colm Browne	Laois	1
MD	Plunkett Donaghy	Tyrone	1
MD	Liam Irwin	Laois	1
RWF	Ray McCarron	Monaghan	1
CF	Eugene McKenna	Tyrone	2
LWF	Pat Spillane	Kerry	9
RCF	Mikey Sheehy	Kerry	7
FF	Damien O'Hagan	Tyrone	1
LCF	Ger Power	Kerry	6

Player has previously been selected.

County breakdown

- Kerry = 6
- Tyrone = 4
- Laois = 2
- Roscommon = 1
- Meath = 1
- Monaghan = 1

=== 1987 ===
Pos.	Player	Team	Appearances
GK	John Kerins	Cork	1
RCB	Robbie O'Malley	Meath	1
FB	Colman Corrigan	Cork	1
LCB	Tony Scullion	Derry	1
RWB	Niall Cahalane	Cork	1
CB	Tom Spillane	Kerry	3
LWB	Ger Lynch	Kerry	1
MD	Gerry McEntee	Meath	1
MD	Brian McGilligan	Derry	1
RWF	David Beggy	Meath	1
CF	Larry Tompkins	Cork	1
LWF	Kieran Duff	Dublin	1
RCF	Val Daly	Galway	1
FF	Brian Stafford	Meath	1
LCF	Bernard Flynn	Meath	1

Player has previously been selected.

County breakdown

- Meath = 5
- Cork = 4
- Derry = 2
- Kerry = 2
- Dublin = 1
- Galway = 1

=== 1988 ===
Pos.	Player	Team	Appearances
GK	Paddy Linden	Monaghan	1
RCB	Robbie O'Malley	Meath	2
FB	Colman Corrigan	Cork	2
LCB	Mick Kennedy	Dublin	1
RWB	Niall Cahalane	Cork	2
CB	Noel McCaffrey	Dublin	1
LWB	Martin O'Connell	Meath	1
MD	Shea Fahy	Cork	1
MD	Liam Hayes	Meath	1
RWF	Maurice Fitzgerald	Kerry	1
CF	Larry Tompkins	Cork	2
LWF	Kieran Duff	Dublin	2
RCF	Colm O'Rourke	Meath	2
FF	Brian Stafford	Meath	2
LCF	Eugene Hughes	Monaghan	3

Player has previously been selected.

County breakdown

- Meath = 5
- Cork = 4
- Dublin = 3
- Monaghan = 2
- Kerry = 1

=== 1989 ===
Pos.	Player	Team	Appearances
GK	Gabriel Irwin	Mayo	1
RCB	Jimmy Browne	Mayo	1
FB	Gerry Hargan	Dublin	2
LCB	Dermot Flanagan	Mayo	2
RWB	Connie Murphy	Kerry	1
CB	Conor Counihan	Cork	1
LWB	Tony Davis	Cork	1
MD	Teddy McCarthy	Cork	1
MD	Willie Joe Padden	Mayo	2
RWF	Dave Barry	Cork	1
CF	Larry Tompkins	Cork	3
LWF	Noel Durkin	Mayo	1
RCF	Paul McGrath	Cork	1
FF	Eugene McKenna	Tyrone	3
LCF	Tony McManus	Roscommon	1

Player has previously been selected.

County breakdown

- Cork = 6
- Mayo = 5
- Dublin = 1
- Kerry = 1
- Tyrone = 1
- Roscommon = 1

== 1990s ==
=== 1990 ===
Pos.	Player	Team	Appearances
GK	John Kerins	Cork	2
RCB	Robbie O'Malley	Meath	3
FB	Steven O'Brien	Cork	1
LCB	Terry Ferguson	Meath	1
RWB	Michael Slocum	Cork	1
CB	Conor Counihan	Cork	2
LWB	Martin O'Connell	Meath	2
MD	Shea Fahy	Cork	2
MD	Mickey Quinn	Leitrim	1
RWF	David Beggy	Meath	2
CF	Val Daly	Galway	2
LWF	Joyce McMullan	Donegal	1
RCF	Paul McGrath	Cork	2
FF	Kevin O'Brien	Wicklow	1
LCF	James McCartan Jnr	Down	1

Player has previously been selected.

County breakdown

- Cork = 6
- Meath = 4
- Leitrim = 1
- Galway = 1
- Donegal = 1
- Wicklow = 1
- Down = 1

=== 1991 ===
Pos.	Player	Team	Appearances
GK	Michael McQuillan	Meath	1
RCB	Mick Deegan	Dublin	1
FB	Conor Deegan	Down	1
LCB	Enon Gavin	Roscommon	1
RWB	Tommy Carr	Dublin	1
CB	Keith Barr	Dublin	1
LWB	Martin O'Connell	Meath	3
MD	Barry Breen	Down	1
MD	Martin Lynch	Kildare	1
RWF	Ross Carr	Down	1
CF	Greg Blaney	Down	2
LWF	Tommy Dowd	Meath	1
RCF	Colm O'Rourke	Meath	3
FF	Brian Stafford	Meath	3
LCF	Bernard Flynn	Meath	2

Player has previously been selected.

County breakdown

- Meath = 6
- Down = 4
- Dublin = 3
- Roscommon = 1
- Kildare = 1

=== 1992 ===
Pos.	Player	Team	Appearances
GK	Gary Walsh	Donegal	1
RCB	Seamus Clancy	Clare	1
FB	Matt Gallagher	Donegal	1
LCB	Tony Scullion	Derry	2
RWB	Paul Curran	Dublin	1
CB	Martin Gavigan	Donegal	1
LWB	Eamon Heery	Dublin	1
MD	Anthony Molloy	Donegal	1
MD	T. J. Kilgallon	Mayo	1
RWF	Anthony Tohill	Derry	1
CF	Martin McHugh	Donegal	2
LWF	James McHugh	Donegal	1
RCF	Tony Boyle	Donegal	1
FF	Vinny Murphy	Dublin	1
LCF	Enda Gormley	Derry	1

Player has previously been selected.

County breakdown

- Donegal = 7
- Derry = 3
- Dublin = 3
- Clare = 1
- Mayo = 1

=== 1993 ===
Pos.	Player	Team	Appearances
GK	John O'Leary	Dublin	3
RCB	John Joe Doherty	Donegal	1
FB	Dermot Deasy	Dublin	1
LCB	Tony Scullion	Derry	3
RWB	Johnny McGurk	Derry	1
CB	Henry Downey	Derry	1
LWB	Gary Coleman	Derry	1
MD	Anthony Tohill	Derry	2
MD	Brian McGilligan	Derry	2
RWF	Kevin O'Neill	Mayo	1
CF	Joe Kavanagh	Cork	1
LWF	Charlie Redmond	Dublin	1
RCF	Colin Corkery	Cork	1
FF	Ger Houlahan	Armagh	1
LCF	Enda Gormley	Derry	2

Player has previously been selected.

County breakdown

- Derry = 7
- Dublin = 3
- Cork = 2
- Donegal = 1
- Mayo = 1
- Armagh = 1

=== 1994 ===
Pos.	Player	Team	Appearances
GK	John O'Leary	Dublin	4
RCB	Miceal Magill	Down	1
FB	Seamus Quinn	Leitrim	1
LCB	Paul Higgins	Down	1
RWB	Graham Geraghty	Meath	1
CB	Steven O'Brien	Cork	2
LWB	D. J. Kane	Down	1
MD	Jack Sheedy	Dublin	1
MD	Gregory McCartan	Down	1
RWF	Peter Canavan	Tyrone	1
CF	Greg Blaney	Down	3
LWF	James McCartan Jnr	Down	2
RCF	Mickey Linden	Down	1
FF	Tommy Dowd	Meath	2
LCF	Charlie Redmond	Dublin	2

Player has previously been selected.

County breakdown

- Down = 7
- Dublin = 3
- Meath = 2
- Leitrim = 1
- Cork = 1
- Tyrone = 1

=== 1995 ===
Pos.	Player	Team	Appearances
GK	John O'Leary	Dublin	5
RCB	Tony Scullion	Derry	4
FB	Mark O'Connor	Cork	1
LCB	Fay Devlin	Tyrone	1
RWB	Paul Curran	Dublin	2
CB	Keith Barr	Dublin	2
LWB	Steven O'Brien	Cork	3
MD	Brian Stynes	Dublin	1
MD	Anthony Tohill	Derry	3
RWF	Jarlath Fallon	Galway	1
CF	Dessie Farrell	Dublin	1
LWF	Paul Clarke	Dublin	1
RCF	Tommy Dowd	Meath	3
FF	Peter Canavan^{FOTY}	Tyrone	2
LCF	Charlie Redmond	Dublin	3

Player has previously been selected.

County breakdown

- Dublin = 7
- Derry = 2
- Cork = 2
- Tyrone = 2
- Galway = 1
- Meath = 1

=== 1996 ===
Pos.	Player	Team	Appearances
GK	Finbar McConnell	Tyrone	1
RCB	Kenneth Mortimer	Mayo	1
FB	Darren Fay	Meath	1
LCB	Martin O'Connell	Meath	4
RWB	Pat Holmes	Mayo	1
CB	James Nallen	Mayo	1
LWB	Paul Curran	Dublin	3
MD	John McDermott	Meath	1
MD	Liam McHale	Mayo	1
RWF	Trevor Giles^{FOTY}	Meath	1
CF	Tommy Dowd	Meath	4
LWF	James Horan	Mayo	1
RCF	Joe Brolly	Derry	1
FF	Peter Canavan	Tyrone	3
LCF	Maurice Fitzgerald	Kerry	2

Player has previously been selected.

County breakdown

- Meath = 5
- Mayo = 5
- Tyrone = 2
- Dublin = 1
- Derry = 1
- Kerry = 1

=== 1997 ===
Pos.	Player	Team	Appearances
GK	Declan O'Keeffe	Kerry	1
RCB	Kenneth Mortimer	Mayo	2
FB	Davy Dalton	Kildare	1
LCB	Cathal Daly	Offaly	1
RWB	Séamus Moynihan	Kerry	1
CB	Glenn Ryan	Kildare	1
LWB	Eamonn Breen	Kerry	1
MD	Pat Fallon	Mayo	1
MD	Niall Buckley	Kildare	1
RWF	Pa Laide	Kerry	1
CF	Trevor Giles	Meath	2
LWF	Dermot McCabe	Cavan	1
RCF	Joe Brolly	Derry	2
FF	Brendan Reilly	Meath	1
LCF	Maurice Fitzgerald^{FOTY}	Kerry	3

Player has previously been selected.

County breakdown

- Kerry = 5
- Kildare = 3
- Mayo = 2
- Meath = 2
- Offaly = 1
- Cavan = 1
- Derry = 1

List of nominees

=== 1998 ===
Pos.	Player	Team	Appearances
GK	Martin McNamara	Galway	1
RCB	Brian Lacey	Kildare	1
FB	Seán Marty Lockhart	Derry	1
LCB	Tomás Mannion	Galway	1
RWB	John Finn	Kildare	1
CB	Glenn Ryan	Kildare	2
LWB	Seán Óg de Paor	Galway	1
MD	John McDermott	Meath	2
MD	Kevin Walsh	Galway	1
RWF	Michael Donnellan	Galway	1
CF	Jarlath Fallon^{FOTY}	Galway	2
LWF	Dermot Earley	Kildare	1
RCF	Karl O'Dwyer	Kildare	1
FF	Pádraic Joyce	Galway	1
LCF	Declan Browne	Tipperary	1

Player has previously been selected.

County breakdown

- Galway = 7
- Kildare = 5
- Derry = 1
- Meath = 1
- Tipperary = 1

List of nominees

=== 1999 ===
Pos.	Player	Team	Appearances
GK	Kevin O'Dwyer	Cork	1
RCB	Mark O'Reilly	Meath	1
FB	Darren Fay	Meath	2
LCB	Anthony Lynch	Cork	1
RWB	Ciarán O'Sullivan	Cork	1
CB	Kieran McGeeney	Armagh	1
LWB	Paddy Reynolds	Meath	1
MD	John McDermott	Meath	3
MD	Ciarán Whelan	Dublin	1
RWF	Diarmaid Marsden	Armagh	1
CF	Trevor Giles^{FOTY}	Meath	3
LWF	James Horan	Mayo	2
RCF	Philip Clifford	Cork	1
FF	Graham Geraghty	Meath	2
LCF	Ollie Murphy	Meath	1

Player has previously been selected.

County breakdown

- Meath = 7
- Cork = 4
- Armagh = 2
- Dublin = 1
- Mayo = 1

List of nominees

== 2000s ==
=== 2000 ===
Pos.	Player	Team	Appearances
GK	Declan O'Keeffe	Kerry	2
RCB	Kieran McKeever	Derry	1
FB	Séamus Moynihan^{FOTY}	Kerry	2
LCB	Mike McCarthy	Kerry	1
RWB	Declan Meehan	Galway	1
CB	Kieran McGeeney	Armagh	2
LWB	Anthony Rainbow	Kildare	1
MD	Anthony Tohill	Derry	4
MD	Darragh Ó Sé	Kerry	1
RWF	Michael Donnellan	Galway	2
CF	Liam Hassett	Kerry	1
LWF	Oisín McConville	Armagh	1
RCF	Mike Frank Russell	Kerry	1
FF	Pádraic Joyce	Galway	2
LCF	Derek Savage	Galway	1

Player has previously been selected.

County breakdown

- Kerry = 6
- Galway = 4
- Derry = 2
- Armagh = 2
- Kildare = 1

List of nominees

=== 2001 ===
Pos.	Player	Team	Appearances
GK	Cormac Sullivan	Meath	1
RCB	Kieran Fitzgerald	Galway	1
FB	Darren Fay	Meath	3
LCB	Coman Goggins	Dublin	1
RWB	Declan Meehan^{FOTY}	Galway	2
CB	Francie Grehan	Roscommon	1
LWB	Seán Óg de Paor	Galway	2
MD	Kevin Walsh	Galway	2
MD	Rory O'Connell	Westmeath	1
RWF	Evan Kelly	Meath	1
CF	Stephen O'Neill	Tyrone	1
LWF	Michael Donnellan	Galway	3
RCF	Ollie Murphy	Meath	2
FF	Pádraic Joyce	Galway	3
LCF	Johnny Crowley	Kerry	1

Player has previously been selected.

County breakdown

- Galway = 6
- Meath = 4
- Dublin = 1
- Roscommon = 1
- Westmeath = 1
- Tyrone = 1
- Kerry = 1

List of nominees

=== 2002 ===
Pos.	Player	Team	Appearances
GK	Stephen Cluxton	Dublin	1
RCB	Enda McNulty	Armagh	1
FB	Paddy Christie	Dublin	1
LCB	Anthony Lynch	Cork	2
RWB	Aidan O'Rourke	Armagh	1
CB	Kieran McGeeney^{FOTY}	Armagh	3
LWB	Kevin Cassidy	Donegal	1
MD	Darragh Ó Sé	Kerry	2
MD	Paul McGrane	Armagh	1
RWF	Steven McDonnell	Armagh	1
CF	Eamonn O'Hara	Sligo	1
LWF	Oisín McConville	Armagh	2
RCF	Peter Canavan	Tyrone	4
FF	Ray Cosgrove	Dublin	1
LCF	Colm Cooper	Kerry	1

Player has previously been selected.

County breakdown

- Armagh = 6
- Dublin = 3
- Kerry = 2
- Cork = 1
- Donegal = 1
- Sligo = 1
- Tyrone = 1

List of nominees

=== 2003 ===
Pos.	Player	Team	Appearances
GK	Fergal Byron	Laois	1
RCB	Francie Bellew	Armagh	1
FB	Cormac McAnallen	Tyrone	1
LCB	Joe Higgins	Laois	1
RWB	Conor Gormley	Tyrone	1
CB	Tom Kelly	Laois	1
LWB	Philip Jordan	Tyrone	1
MD	Kevin Walsh	Galway	3
MD	Seán Cavanagh	Tyrone	1
RWF	Brian Dooher	Tyrone	1
CF	Brian McGuigan	Tyrone	1
LWF	Declan Browne	Tipperary	2
RCF	Steven McDonnell^{FOTY}	Armagh	2
FF	Peter Canavan	Tyrone	4
LCF	Adrian Sweeney	Donegal	1

Player has previously been selected.

County breakdown

- Tyrone = 7
- Laois = 3
- Armagh = 2
- Galway = 1
- Tipperary = 1
- Donegal = 1

List of nominees

=== 2004 ===
Pos.	Player	Team	Appearances
GK	Diarmuid Murphy	Kerry	1
RCB	Tom O'Sullivan	Kerry	1
FB	Barry Owens	Fermanagh	1
LCB	Mike McCarthy	Kerry	2
RWB	Tomás Ó Sé^{FOTY}	Kerry	1
CB	James Nallen	Mayo	2
LWB	John Keane	Westmeath	1
MD	Martin McGrath	Fermanagh	1
MD	Seán Cavanagh	Tyrone	2
RWF	Paul Galvin	Kerry	1
CF	Ciarán McDonald	Mayo	1
LWF	Dessie Dolan	Westmeath	1
RCF	Colm Cooper	Kerry	2
FF	Enda Muldoon	Derry	1
LCF	Matty Forde	Wexford	1

Player has previously been selected.

County breakdown

- Kerry = 6
- Fermanagh = 2
- Mayo = 2
- Westmeath = 2
- Tyrone = 1
- Derry = 1
- Wexford = 1

List of nominees

=== 2005 ===
Pos.	Player	Team	Appearances
GK	Diarmuid Murphy	Kerry	2
RCB	Ryan McMenamin	Tyrone	1
FB	Mike McCarthy	Kerry	3
LCB	Andy Mallon	Armagh	1
RWB	Tomás Ó Sé	Kerry	2
CB	Conor Gormley	Tyrone	2
LWB	Philip Jordan	Tyrone	2
MD	Seán Cavanagh	Tyrone	3
MD	Paul McGrane	Armagh	2
RWF	Brian Dooher	Tyrone	2
CF	Peter Canavan	Tyrone	6
LWF	Owen Mulligan	Tyrone	1
RCF	Colm Cooper	Kerry	3
FF	Stephen O'Neill^{FOTY}	Tyrone	2
LCF	Steven McDonnell	Armagh	3

Player has previously been selected.

County breakdown

- Tyrone = 8
- Kerry = 4
- Armagh = 3

List of nominees

=== 2006 ===
Pos.	Player	Team	Appearances
GK	Stephen Cluxton	Dublin	2
RCB	Marc Ó Sé	Kerry	1
FB	Barry Owens	Fermanagh	2
LCB	Karl Lacey	Donegal	1
RWB	Séamus Moynihan	Kerry	3
CB	Ger Spillane	Cork	1
LWB	Aidan O'Mahony	Kerry	1
MD	Darragh Ó Sé	Kerry	3
MD	Nicholas Murphy	Cork	1
RWF	Paul Galvin	Kerry	2
CF	Alan Brogan	Dublin	1
LWF	Alan Dillon	Mayo	1
RCF	Conor Mortimer	Mayo	1
FF	Kieran Donaghy^{FOTY}	Kerry	1
LCF	Rónán Clarke	Armagh	1

Player has previously been selected.

County breakdown

- Kerry = 6
- Dublin = 2
- Cork = 2
- Mayo = 2
- Fermanagh = 1
- Donegal = 1
- Armagh = 1

List of nominees

=== 2007 ===
Pos.	Player	Team	Appearances
GK	Stephen Cluxton	Dublin	3
RCB	Marc Ó Sé^{FOTY}	Kerry	2
FB	Kevin McCloy	Derry	1
LCB	Graham Canty	Cork	1
RWB	Tomás Ó Sé	Kerry	3
CB	Aidan O'Mahony	Kerry	2
LWB	Barry Cahill	Dublin	1
MD	Ciarán Whelan	Dublin	2
MD	Darragh Ó Sé	Kerry	4
RWF	Stephen Bray	Meath	1
CF	Declan O'Sullivan	Kerry	1
LWF	Alan Brogan	Dublin	2
RCF	Colm Cooper	Kerry	4
FF	Paddy Bradley	Derry	1
LCF	Tomás Freeman	Monaghan	1

Player has previously been selected.

County breakdown

- Kerry = 6
- Dublin = 4
- Derry = 2
- Cork = 1
- Meath = 1
- Monaghan = 1

List of nominees

=== 2008 ===
Pos.	Player	Team	Appearances
GK	Gary Connaughton	Westmeath	1
RCB	Conor Gormley	Tyrone	3
FB	Justin McMahon	Tyrone	1
LCB	John Keane	Westmeath	2
RWB	Davy Harte	Tyrone	1
CB	Tomás Ó Sé	Kerry	4
LWB	Philip Jordan	Tyrone	3
MD	Enda McGinley	Tyrone	1
MD	Shane Ryan	Dublin	1
RWF	Brian Dooher	Tyrone	3
CF	Declan O'Sullivan	Kerry	2
LWF	Seán Cavanagh^{FOTY}	Tyrone	4
RCF	Colm Cooper	Kerry	5
FF	Kieran Donaghy	Kerry	2
LCF	Rónán Clarke	Armagh	2

Player has previously been selected.

County breakdown

- Tyrone = 7
- Kerry = 4
- Westmeath = 2
- Dublin = 1
- Armagh = 1

List of nominees

=== 2009 ===
Pos.	Player	Team	Appearances
GK	Diarmuid Murphy	Kerry	3
RCB	Karl Lacey	Donegal	2
FB	Michael Shields	Cork	1
LCB	Tom O'Sullivan	Kerry	2
RWB	Tomás Ó Sé	Kerry	5
CB	Graham Canty	Cork	2
LWB	John Miskella	Cork	1
MD	Dermot Earley	Kildare	2
MD	Séamus Scanlon	Kerry	1
RWF	Paul Galvin^{FOTY}	Kerry	3
CF	Pearse O'Neill	Cork	1
LWF	Tadhg Kennelly	Kerry	1
RCF	Daniel Goulding	Cork	1
FF	Declan O'Sullivan	Kerry	3
LCF	Stephen O'Neill	Tyrone	3

Player has previously been selected.

County breakdown

- Kerry = 7
- Cork = 5
- Donegal = 1
- Kildare = 1
- Tyrone = 1

List of nominees

== 2010s ==
=== 2010 ===
Pos.	Player	Team	Appearances
GK	Brendan McVeigh	Down	1
RCB	Peter Kelly	Kildare	1
FB	Michael Shields	Cork	2
LCB	Charlie Harrison	Sligo	1
RWB	Paudie Kissane	Cork	1
CB	Graham Canty	Cork	3
LWB	Philip Jordan	Tyrone	4
MD	Paddy Keenan	Louth	1
MD	Aidan Walsh	Cork	1
RWF	Daniel Hughes	Down	1
CF	Martin Clarke	Down	1
LWF	Johnny Doyle	Kildare	1
RCF	Colm Cooper	Kerry	6
FF	Bernard Brogan^{FOTY}	Dublin	1
LCF	Benny Coulter	Down	1

Player has previously been selected.

County breakdown

- Cork = 4
- Down = 4
- Kildare = 2
- Sligo = 1
- Louth = 1
- Tyrone = 1
- Kerry = 1
- Dublin = 1

List of nominations

=== 2011 ===
Pos.	Player	Team	Appearances
GK	Stephen Cluxton	Dublin	4
RCB	Marc Ó Sé	Kerry	3
FB	Neil McGee	Donegal	1
LCB	Michael Foley	Kildare	1
RWB	Kevin Cassidy	Donegal	2
CB	Karl Lacey	Donegal	3
LWB	Kevin Nolan	Dublin	1
MD	Bryan Sheehan	Kerry	1
MD	Michael Darragh MacAuley	Dublin	1
RWF	Darran O'Sullivan	Kerry	1
CF	Alan Brogan^{FOTY}	Dublin	3
LWF	Paul Flynn	Dublin	1
RCF	Colm Cooper	Kerry	7
FF	Andy Moran	Mayo	1
LCF	Bernard Brogan	Dublin	2

Player has previously been selected.

County breakdown

- Dublin = 6
- Kerry = 4
- Donegal = 3
- Mayo = 1
- Kildare = 1

List of nominees

=== 2012 ===
Pos.	Player	Team	Appearances
GK	Paul Durcan	Donegal	1
RCB	Neil McGee	Donegal	2
FB	Ger Cafferkey	Mayo	1
LCB	Keith Higgins	Mayo	1
RWB	Lee Keegan	Mayo	1
CB	Karl Lacey^{FOTY}	Donegal	4
LWB	Frank McGlynn	Donegal	1
MD	Neil Gallagher	Donegal	1
MD	Aidan Walsh	Cork	2
RWF	Paul Flynn	Dublin	2
CF	Alan Dillon	Mayo	2
LWF	Mark McHugh	Donegal	1
RCF	Colm O'Neill	Cork	1
FF	Michael Murphy	Donegal	1
LCF	Colm McFadden	Donegal	1

Player has previously been selected.

County breakdown

- Donegal = 8
- Mayo = 4
- Cork = 2
- Dublin = 1

List of nominees

=== 2013 ===
Pos.	Player	Team	Appearances
GK	Stephen Cluxton	Dublin	5
RCB	Colin Walshe	Monaghan	1
FB	Rory O'Carroll	Dublin	1
LCB	Keith Higgins	Mayo	2
RWB	Lee Keegan	Mayo	2
CB	Cian O'Sullivan	Dublin	1
LWB	Colm Boyle	Mayo	1
MD	Michael Darragh MacAuley^{FOTY}	Dublin	2
MD	Aidan O'Shea	Mayo	1
RWF	Paul Flynn	Dublin	3
CF	Colm Cooper	Kerry	8
LWF	Seán Cavanagh	Tyrone	5
RCF	James O'Donoghue	Kerry	1
FF	Bernard Brogan	Dublin	3
LCF	Conor McManus	Monaghan	1

Player has previously been selected.

County breakdown

- Dublin = 6
- Mayo = 4
- Monaghan = 2
- Kerry = 2
- Tyrone = 1

List of nominees

=== 2014 ===
Pos.	Player	Team	Appearances
GK	Paul Durcan	Donegal	2
RCB	Paul Murphy	Kerry	1
FB	Neil McGee	Donegal	3
LCB	Keith Higgins	Mayo	3
RWB	James McCarthy	Dublin	1
CB	Peter Crowley	Kerry	1
LWB	Colm Boyle	Mayo	2
MD	Neil Gallagher	Donegal	2
MD	David Moran	Kerry	1
RWF	Paul Flynn	Dublin	4
CF	Michael Murphy	Donegal	2
LWF	Diarmuid Connolly	Dublin	1
RCF	Cillian O'Connor	Mayo	1
FF	Kieran Donaghy	Kerry	3
LCF	James O'Donoghue^{FOTY}	Kerry	2

Player has previously been selected.

County breakdown

- Kerry= 5
- Donegal= 4
- Dublin= 3
- Mayo= 3

List of nominees

=== 2015 ===
Pos.	Player	Team	Appearances
GK	Brendan Kealy	Kerry	1
RCB	Shane Enright	Kerry	1
FB	Rory O'Carroll	Dublin	2
LCB	Philly McMahon	Dublin	1
RWB	Lee Keegan	Mayo	3
CB	Cian O'Sullivan	Dublin	2
LWB	Jack McCaffrey^{FOTY}	Dublin	1
MD	Brian Fenton	Dublin	1
MD	Anthony Maher	Kerry	1
RWF	Mattie Donnelly	Tyrone	1
CF	Ciarán Kilkenny	Dublin	1
LWF	Donnchadh Walsh	Kerry	1
RCF	Conor McManus	Monaghan	2
FF	Aidan O'Shea	Mayo	2
LCF	Bernard Brogan	Dublin	4

Player has previously been selected.

County breakdown

- Dublin= 7
- Kerry= 4
- Mayo= 2
- Tyrone= 1
- Monaghan= 1

List of nominees

=== 2016 ===
Pos.	Player	Team	Appearances
GK	David Clarke	Mayo	1
RCB	Brendan Harrison	Mayo	1
FB	Jonny Cooper	Dublin	1
LCB	Philly McMahon	Dublin	2
RWB	Lee Keegan^{FOTY}	Mayo	4
CB	Colm Boyle	Mayo	3
LWB	Ryan McHugh	Donegal	1
MD	Brian Fenton	Dublin	2
MD	Mattie Donnelly	Tyrone	2
RWF	Peter Harte	Tyrone	1
CF	Diarmuid Connolly	Dublin	2
LWF	Ciarán Kilkenny	Dublin	2
RCF	Dean Rock	Dublin	1
FF	Michael Quinlivan	Tipperary	1
LCF	Paul Geaney	Kerry	1

Player has previously been selected.

County breakdown

- Dublin = 6
- Mayo = 4
- Tyrone = 2
- Donegal = 1
- Kerry = 1
- Tipperary = 1

List of nominees

=== 2017 ===
Pos.	Player	Team	Appearances
GK	David Clarke	Mayo	2
RCB	Chris Barrett	Mayo	1
FB	Michael Fitzsimons	Dublin	1
LCB	Keith Higgins	Mayo	4
RWB	Colm Boyle	Mayo	4
CB	Cian O'Sullivan	Dublin	3
LWB	Jack McCaffrey	Dublin	2
MD	Colm Cavanagh	Tyrone	1
MD	James McCarthy	Dublin	2
RWF	Dean Rock	Dublin	2
CF	Aidan O'Shea	Mayo	3
LWF	Con O'Callaghan	Dublin	1
RCF	Paul Mannion	Dublin	1
FF	Paul Geaney	Kerry	2
LCF	Andy Moran^{FOTY}	Mayo	2

Player has previously been selected.

County breakdown

- Dublin = 7
- Mayo = 6
- Kerry = 1
- Tyrone = 1

List of nominees

=== 2018 ===
Pos.	Player	Team	Appearances
GK	Rory Beggan	Monaghan	1
RCB	Jonny Cooper	Dublin	2
FB	Colm Cavanagh	Tyrone	2
LCB	Pádraig Hampsey	Tyrone	1
RWB	Karl O'Connell	Monaghan	1
CB	James McCarthy	Dublin	3
LWB	Jack McCaffrey	Dublin	3
MD	Brian Fenton^{FOTY}	Dublin	3
MD	Brian Howard	Dublin	1
RWF	Paul Mannion	Dublin	2
CF	Ciarán Kilkenny	Dublin	3
LWF	Ryan McHugh	Donegal	2
RCF	David Clifford	Kerry	1
FF	Conor McManus	Monaghan	3
LCF	Ian Burke	Galway	1

Player has previously been selected.

County breakdown

- Dublin = 7
- Monaghan = 3
- Tyrone = 2
- Kerry = 1
- Donegal = 1
- Galway = 1

List of nominees

=== 2019 ===
Pos.	Player	Team	Appearances
GK	Stephen Cluxton^{FOTY}	Dublin	6
RCB	Michael Fitzsimons	Dublin	2
FB	Ronan McNamee	Tyrone	1
LCB	Tom O'Sullivan	Kerry	1
RWB	Patrick Durcan	Mayo	1
CB	Brian Howard	Dublin	2
LWB	Jack McCaffrey	Dublin	4
MD	Brian Fenton	Dublin	4
MD	David Moran	Kerry	2
RWF	Paul Mannion	Dublin	3
CF	Seán O'Shea	Kerry	1
LWF	Michael Murphy	Donegal	3
RCF	David Clifford	Kerry	2
FF	Cathal McShane	Tyrone	1
LCF	Con O'Callaghan	Dublin	2

Player has previously been selected.

County breakdown

- Dublin = 7
- Kerry = 4
- Tyrone = 2
- Mayo = 1
- Donegal = 1

List of nominees

== 2020s ==
=== 2020 ===
Pos.	Player	Team	Appearances
GK	Raymond Galligan	Cavan	1
RCB	Oisín Mullin	Mayo	1
FB	Padraig Faulkner	Cavan	1
LCB	Michael Fitzsimons	Dublin	3
RWB	James McCarthy	Dublin	4
CB	John Small	Dublin	1
LWB	Eoin Murchan	Dublin	1
MD	Brian Fenton^{FOTY}	Dublin	5
MD	Thomas Galligan	Cavan	1
RWF	Niall Scully	Dublin	1
CF	Ciarán Kilkenny	Dublin	4
LWF	Con O'Callaghan	Dublin	3
RCF	Cillian O'Connor	Mayo	2
FF	Conor Sweeney	Tipperary	1
LCF	Dean Rock	Dublin	3

Player has previously been selected.

County breakdown

- Dublin = 9
- Cavan = 3
- Mayo = 2
- Tipperary = 1

=== 2021 ===
Pos.	Player	Team	Appearances
GK	Niall Morgan	Tyrone	1
RCB	Pádraig Hampsey	Tyrone	2
FB	Lee Keegan	Mayo	5
LCB	Tom O'Sullivan	Kerry	2
RWB	Conor Meyler	Tyrone	1
CB	Kieran McGeary^{FOTY}	Tyrone	1
LWB	Peter Harte	Tyrone	2
MD	Brian Kennedy	Tyrone	1
MD	Matthew Ruane	Mayo	1
RWF	Niall Sludden	Tyrone	1
CF	Paudie Clifford	Kerry	1
LWF	Ciarán Kilkenny	Dublin	5
RCF	Darren McCurry	Tyrone	1
FF	David Clifford	Kerry	3
LCF	Ryan O'Donoghue	Mayo	1

Player has previously been selected.

County breakdown

- Tyrone = 8
- Mayo = 3
- Kerry = 3
- Dublin = 1

=== 2022 ===
Pos.	Player	Team	Appearances
GK	Shane Ryan	Kerry	1
RCB	Chrissy McKaigue	Derry	1
FB	Jason Foley	Kerry	1
LCB	Liam Silke	Galway	1
RWB	Tadhg Morley	Kerry	1
CB	John Daly	Galway	1
LWB	Gavin White	Kerry	1
MD	Conor Glass	Derry	1
MD	Cillian McDaid	Galway	1
RWF	Paudie Clifford	Kerry	2
CF	Seán O'Shea	Kerry	2
LWF	Ciarán Kilkenny	Dublin	6
RCF	David Clifford^{FOTY}	Kerry	4
FF	Damien Comer	Galway	1
LCF	Shane Walsh	Galway	1

Player has previously been selected.

County breakdown

- Kerry = 7
- Galway = 5
- Derry = 2
- Dublin = 1

=== 2023 ===
Pos.	Player	Team	Appearances
GK	Stephen Cluxton	Dublin	7
RCB	Conor McCluskey	Derry	1
FB	Michael Fitzsimons	Dublin	4
LCB	Tom O'Sullivan	Kerry	3
RWB	James McCarthy	Dublin	5
CB	Gareth McKinless	Derry	1
LWB	Conor McCarthy	Monaghan	1
MD	Brian Fenton	Dublin	6
MD	Brendan Rogers	Derry	1
RWF	Paudie Clifford	Kerry	3
CF	Seán O'Shea	Kerry	3
LWF	Enda Smith	Roscommon	1
RCF	David Clifford^{FOTY}	Kerry	5
FF	Shane McGuigan	Derry	1
LCF	Colm Basquel	Dublin	1

Player has previously been selected.

County breakdown

- Dublin = 5
- Kerry = 4
- Derry = 4
- Monaghan = 1
- Roscommon = 1

=== 2024 ===
Pos.	Player	Team	Appearances
GK	Niall Morgan	Tyrone	2
RCB	Johnny McGrath	Galway	1
FB	Barry McCambridge	Armagh	1
LCB	Peadar Mogan	Donegal	1
RWB	Dylan McHugh	Galway	1
CB	Aidan Forker	Armagh	1
LWB	Craig Lennon	Louth	1
MD	Paul Conroy^{FOTY}	Galway	1
MD	Ben Crealey	Armagh	1
RWF	Rian O'Neill	Armagh	1
CF	John Maher	Galway	1
LWF	Oisín Conaty	Armagh	1
RCF	Robert Finnerty	Galway	1
FF	Oisín Gallen	Donegal	1
LCF	Conor Turbitt	Armagh	1

Player has previously been selected.

County breakdown

- Armagh = 6
- Galway = 5
- Donegal = 2
- Tyrone = 1
- Louth = 1

=== 2025 ===
Pos.	Player	Team	Appearances
GK	Shane Ryan	Kerry	2
RCB	Brendan McCole	Donegal	1
FB	Jason Foley	Kerry	2
LCB	Seán Rafferty	Meath	1
RWB	Brian Ó Beaglaoich	Kerry	1
CB	Gavin White	Kerry	2
LWB	Finnbarr Roarty	Donegal	1
MD	Joe O'Connor	Kerry	1
MD	Michael Langan	Donegal	1
RWF	Paudie Clifford	Kerry	4
CF	Seán O'Shea	Kerry	4
LWF	Oisín Conaty	Armagh	2
RCF	David Clifford^{FOTY}	Kerry	6
FF	Michael Murphy	Donegal	4
LCF	Sam Mulroy	Louth	1

Player has previously been selected.

County breakdown

- Kerry = 8
- Donegal = 4
- Meath = 1
- Louth = 1
- Armagh = 1

== Cú Chulainn Awards ==
=== 1963 ===
Pos.	Player	Team	Appearances
GK	Andy Phillips	Wicklow	1
RCB	Gabriel Kelly	Cavan	1
FB	Noel Tierney	Galway	1
LCB	Pa Connolly	Kildare	1
RWB	Seamus Murphy	Kerry	1
CB	Paddy Holden	Dublin	1
LWB	Martin Newell	Galway	1
MD	Mick Garrett	Galway	1
MD	Des Foley	Dublin	1
RWF	Seán O'Neill	Down	1
CF	Mickey Whelan	Dublin	1
LWF	Tom Browne	Laois	1
RCF	Jimmy Whan	Armagh	1
FF	Tom Long	Kerry	1
LCF	Pat Donnellan	Galway	1

=== 1964 ===
Pos.	Player	Team	Appearances
GK	Johnny Geraghty	Galway	1
RCB	Gabriel Kelly	Cavan	2
FB	Noel Tierney	Galway	2
LCB	Peter Darby	Meath	1
RWB	Enda Colleran	Galway	1
CB	Paddy Holden	Dublin	2
LWB	Frank Lynch	Louth	1
MD	Mick O'Connell	Kerry	1
MD	Mick Reynolds	Galway	1
RWF	Cyril Dunne	Galway	1
CF	Mattie McDonagh	Galway	1
LWF	Mickey Kearins	Sligo	1
RCF	Seán O'Neill	Down	2
FF	Charlie Gallagher	Cavan	1
LCF	Paddy Doherty	Down	1

=== 1965 ===
Pos.	Player	Team	Appearances
GK	Johnny Geraghty	Galway	2
RCB	Enda Colleran	Galway	2
FB	Tom McCreesh	Armagh	1
LCB	Bosco McDermott	Galway	1
RWB	Donie O'Sullivan	Kerry	1
CB	Paddy Holden	Dublin	3
LWB	Martin Newell	Galway	1
MD	Mick O'Connell	Kerry	2
MD	Des Foley	Dublin	2
RWF	Cyril Dunne	Galway	2
CF	Mickey Kearins	Sligo	2
LWF	Seamus Leydon	Galway	1
RCF	Sean Murray	Longford	1
FF	Seán O'Neill	Down	3
LCF	Paddy Doherty	Down	2

=== 1966 ===
Pos.	Player	Team	Appearances
GK	Johnny Geraghty	Galway	3
RCB	Enda Colleran	Galway	3
FB	Jack Quinn	Meath	1
LCB	Peter Darby	Meath	2
RWB	Pat Collier	Meath	1
CB	Mick Carolan	Kildare	1
LWB	Brendan Barden	Longford	1
MD	Pat Donnellan	Galway	2
MD	Ray Carolan	Cavan	1
RWF	Mickey Kearins	Sligo	3
CF	Mattie McDonagh	Galway	2
LWF	Seamus Leydon	Galway	2
RCF	Pat Dunny	Kildare	1
FF	Con O'Sullivan	Cork	1
LCF	John Keenan	Galway	1

=== 1967 ===
Pos.	Player	Team	Appearances
GK	Billy Morgan	Cork	1
RCB	Gabriel Kelly	Cavan	3
FB	Jack Quinn	Meath	2
LCB	Seamus O'Connor	Mayo	1
RWB	Frank Cogan	Cork	1
CB	Bertie Cunningham	Meath	1
LWB	Pat Reynolds	Meath	1
MD	Mick Burke	Cork	1
MD	Ray Carolan	Cavan	2
RWF	Cyril Dunne	Galway	3
CF	Joe Langan	Mayo	1
LWF	Joe Corcoran	Mayo	1
RCF	Sean O'Connell	Derry	1
FF	Con O'Sullivan	Cork	2
LCF	Seán O'Neill	Down	4

== See also ==
- List of All Stars Awards winners (hurling)
- Ladies' Gaelic football All Stars Awards
- Camogie All Stars Awards
