= GPA Gaelic Team of the Year =

Gaelic games awards

The GPA Gaelic Team of the Year, known for sponsorship reasons as the Opel Gaelic Team of the Year, awards were an awards ceremony to honour the performances of Gaelic Athletic Association players. The awards were judged and awarded by the Gaelic Players Association.

In 2011 the GAA and GPA announced that their respective annual player awards schemes were to merge under the sponsorship of Opel. The first merged awards were given out in 2011.

== Hurling awards ==
GPA Hurling Team of the Year Logo

Opel GPA Hurling Team of the Year 2007

=== 2010 winners ===
Brian Codd (Wexford), Paul Curran Evan Costello (Laois), Tommy Walsh (Kilkenny), Michael Walsh (Waterford), Mike Whyte (Offaly), Michael Fennelly (Kilkenny), Brendan Maher (Tipperary), Andy Kennedy (Limerick), Sean Cleary (Offaly), Lar Corbett (Tipperary), Eoin Kelly (Tipperary), Gearoid Burke (Laois), Aodan Keally (Offaly), Barry O'Dowd (Roscommon)

=== 2009 winners ===
PJ Ryan (Kilkenny), Ollie Canning (Galway), JJ Delaney (Kilkenny), Jackie Tyrell (Kilkenny), Tommy Walsh (Kilkenny), Conor O'Mahony (Tipperary), Padraic Maher (Tipperary), Shane McGrath (Tipperary), Michael Rice (Kilkenny), Eddie Brennan (Kilkenny), Seamus Callanan (Tipperary), Eoin Larkin (Kilkenny), John Mullane (Waterford), Henry Shefflin (Kilkenny), Lar Corbett (Tipperary)

=== 2008 winners ===
Brendan Cummins (Tipperary), Michael Kavanagh (Kilkenny), Noel Hickey (Kilkenny), Jackie Tyrell (Kilkenny), Tommy Walsh (Kilkenny), Conor O'Mahony (Tipperary), JJ Delaney (Kilkenny), Shane McGrath (Tipperary), James 'Cha' Fitzpatrick (Kilkenny), Ben O'Connor (Cork), Henry Shefflin (Kilkenny), Eoin Larkin (Kilkenny), Eddie Brennan (Kilkenny), Eoin Kelly (Waterford), John Mullane (Waterford)

=== 2007 winners ===
Hurling Team of the Year

Player	Position	County team
Damien Fitzhenry	Goalkeeper	Wexford
Michael Kavanagh	Right corner back	Kilkenny
Stephen Lucey	Full back	Limerick
Jackie Tyrrell	Left corner back	Kilkenny
Tommy Walsh	Right half back	Kilkenny
Ken McGrath	Centre half back	Waterford
Mark Foley	Left half back	Limerick
James Fitzpatrick	Midfield	Kilkenny
Michael Walsh	Midfield	Waterford
Eddie Brennan	Right half forward	Kilkenny
Ollie Moran	Centre half forward	Limerick
Dan Shanahan	Left half forward	Waterford
Andrew O'Shaughnessy	Right corner forward	Limerick
Henry Shefflin	Full forward	Kilkenny
Martin Comerford	Left corner forward	Kilkenny

=== 2006 winners ===
Dónal Óg Cusack (Cork), Eoin Murphy (Waterford), Paul Curran (Tipperary), Brian Murphy (Cork), Tony Browne (Waterford), Ronan Curran (Cork), Tommy Walsh (Kilkenny), Jerry O'Connor (Cork), James 'Cha' Fitzpatrick (Kilkenny), Dan Shanahan (Waterford), Henry Shefflin (Kilkenny), Martin Comerford (Kilkenny), Ben O'Connor (Cork), Eoin Kelly (Tipperary), Joe Deane (Cork)

== Football awards ==
=== 2010 winners ===
Brendan McVeigh (Down), Charlie Harrison (Sligo), Michael Shields (Cork), Philly McMahon (Dublin), Kevin McKernan (Down), Emmet Bolton (Kildare), Paudie Kissane (Cork), Paddy Keenan (Louth), John Galvin (Limerick), Daniel Hughes (Down), Martin Clarke (Down), John Doyle (Kildare), Daniel Goulding (Cork), Brendan Coulter (Down), Bernard Brogan (Dublin)

=== 2009 winners ===
Diarmuid Murphy (Kerry), Marc Ó Sé (Kerry), Michael Shields (Cork), Tom O'Sullivan (Kerry), Tomás Ó Sé (Kerry), Graham Canty (Cork), John Miskella (Cork), Dermot Earley (Kildare), Seamus Scanlon (Kerry), Paul Galvin (Kerry), Pearse O'Neill (Cork), Paddy Kelly (Cork), Daniel Goulding (Cork), Declan O'Sullivan (Kerry), Tommy Walsh (Kerry)

GPA Gaelic Football Team of the Year logo

Opel GPA Football Team of the Year 2007

=== 2008 winners ===
Football Team of the Year

Player	Position	County team
Anthony Masterson	Goalkeeper	Wexford
John Keane	Right corner back	Westmeath
Justin McMahon	Full back	Tyrone
Conor Gormley	Left corner back	Tyrone
David Harte	Right half back	Tyrone
Philip Jordan	Centre half back	Tyrone
Ryan McMenamin	Left half back	Tyrone
Darragh Ó Sé	Midfield	Kerry
Enda McGinley	Midfield	Tyrone
Brian Dooher	Right half forward	Tyrone
Declan O'Sullivan	Centre half forward	Kerry
Joe McMahon	Left half forward	Tyrone
Colm Cooper	Right corner forward	Kerry
Seán Cavanagh	Full forward	Tyrone
Michael Meehan	Left corner forward	Galway

=== 2007 winners ===
Football Team of the Year

Player	Position	County team
Stephen Cluxton	Goalkeeper	Dublin
Marc Ó Sé	Right corner back	Kerry
Darren Fay	Full back	Meath
Conor Gormley	Left corner back	Tyrone
Tomás Ó Sé	Right half back	Kilkenny
Aidan O'Mahony	Centre half back	Kerry
Barry Cahill	Left half back	Dublin
Darragh Ó Sé	Midfield	Kerry
Nicholas Murphy	Midfield	Cork
Declan O'Sullivan	Right half forward	Kerry
Alan Brogan	Centre half forward	Dublin
Paul Galvin	Left half forward	Kerry
Colm Cooper	Right corner forward	Kerry
Paddy Bradley	Full forward	Derry
Tomás Freeman	Left corner forward	Monaghan

=== 2006 winners ===
Stephen Cluxton (Dublin), Marc Ó Sé (Kerry), Barry Owens (Fermanagh), Seamus Moynihan (Kerry), Bryan Cullen (Dublin), Aidan O'Mahony (Kerry), Nicholas Murphy (Cork), Darragh Ó Sé (Kerry), Alan Dillon (Mayo), Alan Brogan (Dublin), Ciarán McDonald (Mayo), Conor Mortimer (Mayo), Kieran Donaghy (Kerry), Rónán Clarke (Armagh)
