= 2005 All-Ireland Senior Football Championship final =

2005 All-Ireland Football Championship final
- Event: 2005 All-Ireland Senior Football Championship
Tyrone	Kerry
1–16 (19)	2–10 (16)
- Date: 25 September 2005
- Venue: Croke Park, Dublin
- Referee: Michael Monahan (Kildare)
- Attendance: 82,112
- Weather: Dry

The 2005 All-Ireland Senior Football Championship Final was the 118th final of the 2005 All-Ireland Senior Football Championship, the premier Gaelic football competition in Ireland. The match was played on 25 September 2005 at Croke Park in Dublin, between Tyrone and Kerry.

The final was regarded as a pivotal fixture in the emerging rivalry between the two counties in the mid-2000s, with Tyrone seeking their second title and Kerry aiming to retain the Sam Maguire Cup.

== Match ==
=== Summary ===
The final was a tightly contested and high-quality affair. Tyrone, managed by Mickey Harte, came into the final having taken the longest route in championship history, playing ten games (including three replays) to reach the decider.

First Half

Kerry started brightly, securing an early advantage when forward Dara Ó Cinnéide scored the first goal of the game. However, Tyrone steadily worked their way back into the match, led by their dynamic attacking unit. The crucial score of the half came in injury time, when a high ball was won by Owen Mulligan who laid it off to the veteran Peter Canavan, who expertly finished to the net.

This goal gave Tyrone a narrow but significant lead at the interval: Tyrone 1-08, Kerry 1-05.

==== Second Half ====
The second half continued in the same vein. Kerry battled back fiercely, and their efforts were rewarded when wing-back Tomás Ó Sé scored Kerry's second goal, bringing the deficit down to the minimum and setting up a tense finish.

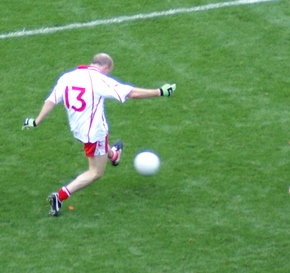
Peter Canavan shoots during the match.

Tyrone, however, refused to be broken. Their defensive system and counter-attacking play proved superior in the final quarter. Key scores from Owen Mulligan (who finished with five points) and the influential Stephen O'Neill (who top-scored for the season with 5-49) kept the scoreboard ticking over. A late point from defender Philip Jordan sealed the victory for the Ulster side.

==== Final Score and Significance ====
The match ended on a scoreline of Tyrone 1–16 to Kerry 2-10. The victory secured Tyrone's second All-Ireland Senior Football Championship title, cementing their status as a dominant force in Gaelic football during that era. The game is often cited as a classic All-Ireland final, demonstrating the intense rivalry and contrasting styles of the two counties.

=== Details ===
25 September 2005
Final

Kerry	2–10 – 1–16	Tyrone
C Cooper 0–5, D Ó Cinnéide 1–1, T Ó Sé 1–0, D Ó Sé, E Brosnan 0–2 each	Report	O Mulligan 0–5, P Canavan 1–1, B McGuigan, S O'Neill 0–3 each, R Mellon 0–2, P Jordan, B Dooher 0–1 each

Croke Park, Dublin
Attendance: 82,112
Referee: Michael Monahan (Kildare)

Kerry
Tyrone

==== Tyrone ====
- 1 P. McConnell
- 2 R. McMenamin
- 3 J. McMahon
- 4 M. McGee
- 5 D. Harte
- 6 C. Gormley
- 7 P. Jordan
- 8 E. McGinley
- 9 S. Cavanagh
- 10 B. Dooher (c)
- 11 B. McGuigan
- 12 R. Mellon
- 13 P. Canavan
- 14 S. O'Neill
- 15 O. Mulligan

Substitutes used
C. Holmes for Canavan
C. Lawn for McMahon
P. Canavan for McGinley

Substitutes not used
J. Devine
E. Bradley
B. Meenan
G. Devlin
B. Donnelly
P. Donnelly
C. Gourley
Mark Harte
C. McCullagh
L. Meenan
M. Murphy
M. Penrose
S. Sweeney

Manager
Mickey Harte

==== Kerry ====
- 1 D. Murphy
- 2 M. McCarthy
- 3 A. O'Mahony
- 4 T. O'Sullivan
- 5 T. Ó Sé
- 6 M. Ó Sé
- 7 S. Moynihan
- 8 D. Ó Sé
- 9 W. Kirby
- 10 L. Hassett
- 11 Declan O'Sullivan (c)
- 12 P. Galvin
- 13 C. Cooper
- 14 E. Brosnan
- 15 D. Ó Cinnéide

Subs used
17 M. F. Russell for L. Hassett
21 Darran O'Sullivan for D. Ó Cinnéide
18 É. Fitzmaurice for S. Moynihan
19 B. Sheehan for P. Galvin

Subs not used
16 K. Cremin
20 B. Guiney
22 D. Quill
23 R. O'Connor
24 P. Kelly
25 K. Donaghy
26 M. Lyons
27 M. Quirke
28 P. Reidy
29 T. Griffin

Manager
Jack O'Connor
