= John Kenny (Gaelic footballer) =

Irish Gaelic footballer

John Kenny (born 1973/1974) is an Irish former Gaelic footballer who played for the Offaly county team.

Kenny won a Leinster Senior Football Championship medal in 1997 and scored a goal against Cavan in the 1997 All-Ireland Senior Football Championship. He then won a National Football League medal while playing for Offaly in 1998. When he won that league title Kenny played at half-back in the league final, a role he played for Offaly in other games, although he could also play as a forward.

Shortly after Paul O'Kelly was appointed Offaly manager, Kenny scored two goals with his fist against Louth in the 2003 National Football League. He retired from inter-county football at the end of 2003 due to family commitments, though it was also reported that Offaly manager Gerry Fahey had dropped him from his panel. However, by 2005, and with Kevin Kilmurray installed as Fahey's replacement, Kenny had returned to playing inter-county football for Offaly, when Tyrone player Conor Gormley broke Kenny's nose during a game in Omagh.
