= Mickey Harte =

Gaelic football manager

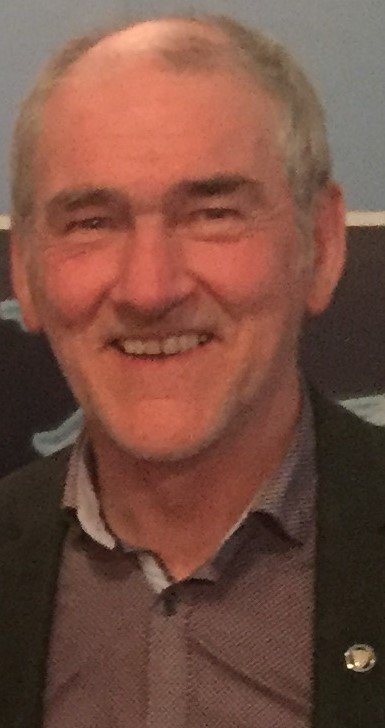

Personal information
- Native name: Mícheál Ó hAirt (Irish)
- Born: 1954 (age 71–72) Glencull, County Tyrone, Northern Ireland
- Occupation: Teacher

Sport
- Sport: Gaelic football
Club management
- Years: Club
- Errigal Ciarán
Inter-county management
- Years: Team
- 2003–2020 2020–2023 2023–2024 2024–2026: Tyrone; Louth; Derry; Offaly
Inter-county titles as manager
County	League	Province	All-Ireland
Tyrone	3	6	6

Mickey Harte (born 1954) is an Irish Gaelic football manager and former player. He has been joint-manager of Offaly since 2024.

Harte managed the Tyrone county team from 2003 until his resignation in 2020, at which time he was the longest-serving manager then active with the same team in inter-county competition. He is the most successful senior manager in the county's history, having led it to three All-Ireland SFC titles, as well as six Ulster SFC titles, one National League and twelve Dr McKenna Cups. Immediately after his exit as Tyrone manager in 2020, Mickey took over the reins of the Louth county team and kept a hold of them until 2023.

Considered one of the best tacticians in the game, Harte is admired both by peers and former rivals.

== Early life ==
Born in Glencull, near Ballygawley, County Tyrone, Northern Ireland, Harte was educated at the Christian Brothers Grammar School in Omagh. He trained to be a teacher at St Joseph's College in Belfast (now St Mary's). He taught for five years at De La Salle Boys School in Kircubben. He then moved to St Ciaran's in Ballygawley. In his 22 years spent there, he achieved numerous successes, including Tyrone, Ulster and All-Ireland Vocational Schools titles. He continued working there as he progressed through the county ranks of Tyrone's Gaelic football side, bringing them to a National Football League title, All-Ireland Minor and U21 victories and eventually, in 2003, the Sam Maguire Cup.

== Management ==
Raised in Ballymacilroy outside Ballygawley, County Tyrone, Harte managed the Tyrone minor team (1991–1998) and under-21 team, winning All-Ireland titles with both, before he was named manager of the senior Tyrone county team. He guided the under-21 team to two All-Ireland Under-21 titles and three Ulster Under-21 titles. He led the minor team to an All-Ireland Minor title and three Ulster Minor titles.

He subsequently managed his home club of Errigal Ciarán and was successful with this team as well, winning the Tyrone County Championship and Ulster Senior Club Football Championship.

Harte's first season in charge of the senior county team came in 2003. His team overcame Down in the 2003 Ulster SFC final, requiring a replay after a drawn game when the team conceded four goals; Harte switched Cormac McAnallen from midfield to full-back for the second game. Tyrone conceded only one further goal in their other four games in that competition, which ended with the county claiming the first All-Ireland Senior Football Championship (SFC) title in its history, and McAnallen would win an All Star Award in this new role. Peter Canavan was injured on the day of the final. Harte started Canavan before withdrawing him at half-time, then unexpectedly bringing him back on with a few minutes remaining and Tyrone narrowly in the lead.

Tyrone and Harte won a second All-Ireland SFC in 2005. The county played a total of ten matches, including three replays, which was a record for any winning team. Tyrone played five matches in the Ulster SFC, including replays against Cavan in the semi-final and against Armagh in the final, which they lost. Having to contest an All-Ireland SFC qualifier as a result of that loss, Tyrone overcame Monaghan to reach an All-Ireland SFC quarter-final against Dublin. Tyrone had yet another drawn game, a match memorable for Owen Mulligan's solo goal. Harte combined Enda McGinley with Joe McMahon for the second half of that game, a move which outwitted Ciarán Whelan, who had been getting the better of his opponents in the first half; Whelan was ultimately removed from the game by the Dublin management. In the All-Ireland SFC semi-final, the county met Armagh for a third time; two points behind with only six minutes of play left and, in what Eamonn Sweeney writing later in the Sunday Independent called "the defining moment of Harte's team", Seán Cavanagh scored a solo point, substitute Shane Sweeney levelled the game and Canavan converted an injury-time free. In the 2005 All-Ireland SFC final, the county defeated Kerry for the second time in three years to win the Sam Maguire Cup.

Harte's and Tyrone's third All-Ireland SFC winning campaign began with a quarter-final loss to Down in the 2008 Ulster SFC. Entering the All-Ireland SFC qualifiers again, the county advanced to the 2008 All-Ireland SFC final against a Kerry team then bidding to win three consecutive titles. Kerry did not. Despite Peter Canavan's retirement, Mulligan's disciplinary problems and O'Neill's on-off retirement through injury, Tyrone won a third All-Ireland SFC title. Harte deployed Justin McMahon to effectively deal with Kerry's Kieran Donaghy (a forward who had become more prominent since the 2005 final), while the half-back line of David Harte, Conor Gormley and Philip Jordan outperformed expectations and Cavanagh scored five points from play. Eamonn Sweeney reckoned 2008 to be "the supreme managerial achievement of Harte's career".

In the latter part of his time as Tyrone manager, Ulster Championship success did not come easy for Harte and his team, having been knocked out five times by Donegal in 2011, 2012, 2013, 2015 and 2020. That 2020 defeat was his last game as Tyrone manager.

In November 2020, Harte was appointed manager of the senior Louth county team for an expected three-year period.

In September 2023, Harte was appointed manager of the Derry county team. Taking over a team that had won consecutive Ulster titles, Harte managed them to a heavy defeat against Donegal at Derry's home venue in his only Ulster championship game as Derry manager. Donegal were able to carve out numerous goal opportunities due to Derry's tactics, but only managed to score four of them. The Irish Times described the game as a "classic". The newspaper also named Donegal's first goal, scored with a lob into an empty net as Derry goalkeeper Odhran Lynch ran back up the pitch after vacating his goal, as its "Moment of the Year". Harte left at the end of the season.

== Advocacy ==
In 2009, Harte attended the launch of Patrick McCrystal's controversial book Who is at the Centre of Your Marriage, the Pill or Jesus Christ?

In 2010, as part of the Catholic Church's "Year for Priests" celebration, he contributed to a DVD, In Praise of Priests, featuring interviews with various people expressing admiration for their favourite priest.

Harte attracted controversy when, in 2013, he provided a character reference for Ronan McCusker, who had pleaded guilty to rape, and Judge Piers Grant singled out the character reference from Harte as one of the "mitigating factors" which led him to pitch the jail sentence towards the bottom of the range; two-and-a-half years, 15 months in jail, 15 on licence.

Harte supported the No Vote in the 2018 abortion referendum.

== Writing and broadcasting ==
In 2009, Harte began writing a weekly column for the Northern Irish newspaper, The Irish News. To date his column has focused on hot topics in Gaelic games, referees and other GAA-related topics.

In October 2009, Harte (with the help of Michael Foley) published an autobiography, Harte: Presence Is The Only Thing. It was published by Poolbeg (ISBN 9781842234198).

Harte makes occasional appearances to offer analysis on the BBC's championship coverage. He did so less than 48 hours after departing as Tyrone manager.

== Personal life ==
Harte is married to Marian, with four children. His daughter Michaela McAreavey was murdered on her honeymoon in Mauritius in January 2011. Two of his brothers also died due to illness around the time of his daughter's murder.

== Honours ==
- Honorary Doctorate by Queen's University Belfast for services to Gaelic football (2006)

Sporting positions
Preceded by Art McRory, Eugene McKenna	Tyrone Senior Football Manager; 2002–2020	Succeeded by Feargal Logan, Brian Dooher
Preceded by Wayne Kierans	Louth Senior Football Manager; 2020–2023	Succeeded by Ger Brennan
Preceded by Rory Gallagher	Derry Senior Football Manager; 2023–2024	Succeeded by Paddy Tally

Awards and achievements
Preceded by Joe Kernan (Armagh)	All-Ireland Senior Football Championship winning manager 2003	Succeeded by Jack O'Connor (Kerry)
Preceded by Jack O'Connor (Kerry)	All-Ireland Senior Football Championship winning manager 2005	Succeeded by Jack O'Connor (Kerry)
Preceded by Pat O'Shea (Kerry)	All-Ireland Senior Football Championship winning manager 2008	Succeeded by Jack O'Connor (Kerry)
