= Eugene Hughes (Gaelic footballer) =

Irish Gaelic footballer (1957 or 1958 – 2025)

Eugene "Nudie" Hughes
Personal information
- Born: 1957 or 1958 County Monaghan, Ireland
- Died: 3 November 2025 (aged 67) Castleblayney, County Monaghan, Republic of Ireland

Sport
- Sport: Gaelic football
- Position: Forward
Club
- Years: Club
- Castleblayney Faughs
Club titles
- Ulster titles: 2
Inter-county
Years	County	Apps (scores)
1979–1991	Monaghan	88
Inter-county titles
- Ulster titles: 3
- All-Irelands: 0
- NFL: 1
- All Stars: 3

Eugene "Nudie" Hughes (1957 or 1958 – 3 November 2025) was an Irish Gaelic footballer who played for the Monaghan county team.

== Playing career ==
Hughes helped Monaghan to victory in the 1985 National Football League Final defeating Armagh and he collected three Ulster Senior Football Championship medals in 1979, defeating Donegal, in 1985, beating Derry and again in 1988, defeating Tyrone in Clones. Hughes was the first Monaghan man to receive an All-Star Award and featured regularly on All-Star teams selected in 1979, 1985 and 1988. He collected a Railway Cup Medal with Ulster in 1984 and he was listed at number 115 in the 125 Greatest Stars of the GAA lists.

== Personal life and death ==
Hughes's nickname "Nudie" arose in his childhood as a neighbouring infant's attempt at pronouncing "Eugene".

In December 2018, shortly after attending the All Stars ceremony at which three Monaghan players received awards in November, Hughes was diagnosed with liver and colon cancer and spoke about it in June 2020.

Hughes died at home in Castleblayney, on 3 November 2025, at the age of 67.
