= Ollie Brady =

Cavan Gaelic footballer

Personal information
- Native name: Oilibhéar Ó Brádaigh (Irish)
- Born: County Cavan, Ireland
- Occupation: ?

Sport
- Sport: Gaelic football
- Position: Half-Back
Club
- Years: Club
- Redhills
Inter-county
- Years: County
- Cavan
Inter-county titles
- Ulster titles: 0
- All-Irelands: 0
- All Stars: 1

Oliver Brady is a former Gaelic footballer who played for the Cavan county team.

== Playing career ==
Brady was a Half-Back who liked to attack from defence. He won an All-Star Award in 1978 making him Cavan's first All Star.
