= Gabriel Kelly =

Cavan Gaelic footballer

Personal information
- Native name: Gaibrial Ò Ceallaigh (Irish)
- Born: County Cavan, Ireland

Sport
- Sport: Gaelic football
- Position: Right Corner Back
Clubs
- Years: Club
- Bailieborough; Cavan Gaels
Inter-county
- Years: County
- 1955–1969: Cavan
Inter-county titles
- Ulster titles: 4
- All-Irelands: 0
- All Stars: 3

Gabriel Kelly is a former Gaelic footballer who played for the Cavan county team.

== Playing career ==
Renowned as one of the great corner-backs of his era, Kelly was the first Cavan man to receive an Cú Chulainn Award and featured regularly on All-Star teams selected in the 1960s ('63, '64, '67). He was a permanent fixture on the all-conquering Ulster Railway Cup teams of the 1960s (1964, ‘ 65, ’66 and ’68). He won Ulster Senior Football Championship medals in 1962, '64, '67 and '69. He went on to manage Cavan in the early '80's.

== Other honours ==
- He won a Connacht Minor Football Championship with the Mayo county team
- Number 122 in The 125 greatest stars of the GAA
