= Karl O'Dwyer =

Irish Gaelic footballer

Personal information
- Born: Waterville, County Kerry
- Occupation: Former Kildare GAA player
- Height: 8 ft 0 in (244 cm)

Sport
- Sport: Gaelic football
- Position: Corner forward/full forward
Clubs
- Years: Club
- 1990's-2000's: Waterville; Rathangan; Round Towers
Club titles
- Kildare titles: 1
Inter-county
Years	County	Apps (scores)
1992-1993 1998-2003	Kerry; Kildare	3(1-05); 7 (0-17)
Inter-county titles
- Leinster titles: 2
- All-Irelands: 0
- NFL: 0 U21 All Ireland = 1
- All Stars: 1

Karl O'Dwyer is a former footballer from Waterville in south County Kerry. He played with the Kerry team that were shocked by Clare in the final of the 1992 Munster Senior Football Championship. He later played with Kildare and had much success when his father Mick was manager. In 1998 he helped Kildare to their first Leinster Senior Football Championship title since 1956, he later helped his team to a first All Ireland final since 1928 but lost out to Galway on the day. In the semi-final Kildare beat O' Dwyers native Kerry. At the end of the year, he picked up an All Stars Award at full forward. In 2000 he once again helped Kildare to a Leinster title. O'Dwyer retired from inter-county in 2002 following Kildare's defeat to Kerry in the All-Ireland Qualifiers.

Before moving to Kildare he played with his local club Watervile and with the South Kerry team. He won 2 South Kerry championship medals. He also captained his club to a Kerry intermediate football title in 1993 and also won 2 county U21 titles with South Kerry. He won an All Ireland U21 medal with Kerry in 1990. In Kildare he first played with Rathangan before joining Round Towers. He won a Kildare Senior Football Championship medal with Round Towers in 2003. He is now a school teacher. He managed St Mary's in Wicklow to a senior championship title in 2011 and took Old Leighlin to 3 consecutive county finals in Carlow (2013-2015), winning in 2013. He managed his school, Confey college, to a Dublin and Leinster title in 2006 and a Dublin title in 2015. He has also managed St Laurence's in Kildare to minor and U21 finals in 2014 and 2016 respectively.
