= Cormac Sullivan =

Meath Gaelic footballer (born 1977)

Personal information
- Native name: Cormac Ó Súilleabháin (Irish)
- Height: 6 ft 3 in (191 cm)

Sport
- Sport: Gaelic Football
- Position: Goalkeeper
Club
- Years: Club
- St Patrick's
Inter-county
- Years: County
- 1996–2006: Meath
Inter-county titles
- Leinster titles: 2
- All-Irelands: 1
- All Stars: 1

Cormac Sullivan (Irish: Cormac Ó Súilleabháin; born 29 April 1977) is a former Gaelic footballer who played as a goalkeeper for the Meath county football team between 1996 and 2006. He played in midfield for his club, St Patrick's GAC, Stamullen. He also represented Ireland in the 2000 and 2001 International Rules Series.

Sullivan was part of the Meath team which won the 1999 All-Ireland Senior Football Championship.

He won an All Star in 2001.

== Honours ==
- All-Ireland Senior Football Championship (1): 1999
- Leinster Senior Football Championship (2): 1999, 2001
- All Star (1): 2001
