= Jimmy Smyth (Gaelic footballer) =

Irish Gaelic footballer

Personal information
- Native name: Séamus Mac Gabhann (Irish)
- Born: 1949 (age 76–77) Donaghcloney, Northern Ireland
- Occupation: Secondary school teacher
- Height: 6 ft 1 in (185 cm)

Sport
- Sport: Gaelic football
- Position: Centre-forward
Club
- Years: Club
- Clan na Gael
Club titles
- Armagh titles: 9
- Ulster titles: 3
- All-Ireland Titles: 0
College(s)
- Years: College
- St Joseph's C.O.F.E., Belfast
Inter-county
- Years: County
- 1968–1981: Armagh
Inter-county titles
- Ulster titles: 2
- All-Irelands: 0
- NFL: 0
- All Stars: 1

James Smyth (born 1949) is an Irish former Gaelic footballer who played for the Clan na Gael club and at senior level for the Armagh county team. A schoolteacher by profession, he captained Armagh in the All-Ireland Final of 1977.

== Playing career ==
Smyth was born in Donaghcloney, County Down, to parents Francis and Mary. He was brought up in Waringstown, where Smyth attended the local Protestant school and played cricket for Waringstown. Later the family moved to nearby Lurgan, County Armagh. He first played Gaelic football as a schoolboy with St Colman's College in Newry. As a member of the college's senior team, he won consecutive MacRory Cup titles as well as a Hogan Cup medal in 1967. He enjoyed success at underage level with the Clan na Gael club in Lurgan, winning three Armagh Minor Championship titles. Smyth would have been eligible to play for Down: while training to be a teacher at St Joseph's Training College, Trench House, Belfast (known as "The Ranch"), he was asked by Colm McAlarney to consider playing for that county. Smyth declined and progressed to Clann na Gael's senior team, winning nine Armagh SFC titles in a golden age for the club between 1968 and 1981. Smyth also won three successive Ulster SCFC titles and was part of the Clan na Gael team beaten by UCD in the 1974 All-Ireland club final.

Smyth first played for the Armagh senior football team in 1968. He quickly became a constant feature on the team and won a National League Division 3 title in 1976. After being appointed team captain in 1977, Smyth guided the team to a first Ulster SFC title in 24 years. Armagh lost the subsequent All-Ireland final to Dublin, however, he ended the year by being named on the All-Star team. Smyth won a second Ulster SFC title in 1980. His performances at inter-county level also earned inclusion on the Ulster team in the Railway Cup.

== Coaching career ==
In retirement from playing, Smyth became involved in team management and coaching. He won two Armagh SFC titles as Clan na Gael manager, while he also won a number of school underage titles with St Paul's School in Lurgan, where he taught.

== Media career ==
Smyth was also a GAA radio and TV commentator for the BBC from 1983 to 2005, starting as a summariser and taking the microphone in 1989 at the suggestion of Jim Neilly; later he did some commentary work for UTV and Setanta Sports.

He is married to Mary and they have four children, Anne-Marie, Paula, Maretta and Ciara.

== Honours ==
St Colman's College

- Hogan Cup: 1967
- MacRory Cup: 1967, 1968

Clan na Gael

- Ulster Senior Club Football Championship: 1972, 1973, 1974
- Armagh Senior Football Championship: 1968, 1969, 1971, 1972, 1973, 1974, 1976, 1980, 1981

Armagh

- Ulster Senior Football Championship: 1977 (c), 1980

Sporting positions
Preceded by	Armagh senior football team captain 1977	Succeeded by
