= Cathal Daly =

Irish Gaelic footballer

Personal information
- Born: County Offaly, Ireland

Sport
- Sport: Gaelic football
- Position: Corner-back
Club
- Years: Club
- 1990s–2000s: Tullamore
Club titles
- Offaly titles: 3
Inter-county
- Years: County
- 1995–2006: Offaly
Inter-county titles
- Leinster titles: 1
- All Stars: 1

Cathal Daly is a Gaelic football coach and former player for Tullamore and the Offaly county team. He is a former Offaly captain.

Daly won a Leinster Senior Football Championship title in 1997 and a National Football League title in 1998. With his club he won three Offaly Senior Football Championships: 2000, 2002 and 2007.

He played in a defensive position. Offaly was the first to achieve an All Star Award representing every number (1–15) in both codes when Daly received his All Star Award in 1997. It was also Offaly's first football All Star since 1983.

Daly is a member of the Garda Síochána. As of 2006, he was stationed in Castlecomer. He retired as a player in 2009 and later took up coaching. He was involved with his club in this capacity in 2024, when Tullamore won a first set of consecutive Offaly SFC titles since 1926. He has also worked with the Offaly minor football team.
