= Conor Gormley =

Irish Gaelic footballer

Personal information
- Native name: Conchúr Ó Garmaile (Irish)
- Nickname: The Block from the Rock
- Born: 10 October 1980 (age 46) Omagh, Northern Ireland
- Occupation: Electrician
- Height: 1.83 m (6 ft 0 in)

Sport
- Sport: Gaelic football
- Position: Centre Back
Club
- Years: Club
- 1997–2023: Carrickmore St Colmcille's
Club titles
- Tyrone titles: 4
Inter-county
- Years: County
- 2001–2014: Tyrone
Inter-county titles
- Ulster titles: 4
- All-Irelands: 3
- NFL: 0
- All Stars: 3

Conor Gormley (born 10 October 1980) is an Irish former Gaelic footballer for the Carrickmore St Colmcille's club and the Tyrone county team. With his county, Gormley won three-time All-Ireland Senior Football Championship titles and three All Stars Awards in 2003, 2005 and 2008.

In 2023 Gormley retired from playing Gaelic football with An Charraig Mhór but as of 2024 he’s still up and at it with the Tyrone Masters.

== Playing career ==
=== Club ===
Gormley played his club football for Carrickmore St Colmcille's and won four Tyrone Senior Championship medals with the club in 1999, 2001, 2004 and 2005.

=== Inter-county ===
Gormley made the Tyrone senior squad managed by Art McRory before he made the U-21 squad managed at the time by Mickey Harte.

During a 2005 National Football League game against Offaly in Omagh, Gormley was sent off after breaking John Kenny's nose.

Gormley was one of the most consistent performers in a Tyrone jersey and was pivotal in the 2003, 2005 and 2008 All-Ireland winning Tyrone county teams.

His greatest moment in a Tyrone jersey came in the 2003 All-Ireland Senior Football Championship Final against Armagh. With two minutes remaining in the match, and Tyrone a vulnerable three points ahead, Steven McDonnell, who had already scored five goals in the Championship had picked up the ball in a very dangerous area, and was bearing down on goal. As he kicked the ball, Gormley made an outstanding diving block to prevent an almost certain goal.

In August 2006, Gormley suffered a double leg break in a club game. This ruled him out for the rest of the year, although he returned to action in 2007, and his performances earned him a Gaelic Players Association award.

== Electrical work ==
Outside of football Gormley is an electrician by trade.
