= Seán Cooney =

Offaly Gaelic footballer

Personal information
- Native name: Seán Ó Cuanaigh (Irish)
- Born: 1946 (age 79–80) Pullough, County Offaly
- Height: 5 ft 8 in (173 cm)

Sport
- Sport: Gaelic football
- Position: Right wing-forward
Club
- Years: Club
- 1960s–1980s: Erin Rovers
Inter-county
Years	County	Apps (scores)
1964–1975	Offaly	29
Inter-county titles
- Leinster titles: 3
- All-Irelands: 2
- NFL: 0
- All Stars: 2

Seán Cooney (born 1946 in Pullough, County Offaly) is an Irish former Gaelic footballer who played as a right wing-forward for the Offaly county football team and at club level with Erin Rovers.

He was a member of the Offaly senior panel from 1964 to 1975 and won two All-Ireland Senior Football Championship titles in 1971 and 1972.

== Playing career ==
=== Inter-county career ===
Cooney made his debut for Offaly in 1964.

He was part of the Offaly team that won the 1971 All-Ireland Senior Football Championship, defeating Galway in the final at Croke Park on 26 September 1971.

He also played in the 1972 championship when Offaly retained the All-Ireland title after defeating Kerry in the final replay.

Offaly won three consecutive Leinster Senior Football Championship titles from 1971 to 1973.

Cooney made approximately 29 championship appearances during his inter-county career.

== Coaching career ==
After his playing career, Cooney became involved in coaching at club level in Offaly.

== Honours ==
=== Offaly ===
- All-Ireland Senior Football Championship: 2 (1971, 1972)
- Leinster Senior Football Championship: 3 (1971, 1972, 1973)

=== Individual ===
- GAA All Stars Awards: 2
