= Tom O'Sullivan (Rathmore Gaelic footballer) =

Kerry Gaelic footballer

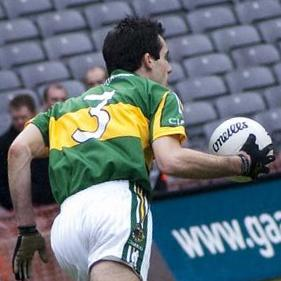

Personal information
- Native name: Tomás Ó Súilleabháin (Irish)
- Born: 15 November 1978 (age 47) County Kerry, Ireland
- Occupation: Garda Síochána
- Height: 6 ft 2 in (188 cm)

Sport
- Sport: Gaelic football
- Position: Left full back
Club
- Years: Club
- 1997 - 2012: Rathmore
Inter-county
Years	County	Apps (scores)
2000-2011	Kerry	65 (0-01)
Inter-county titles
- Munster titles: 8
- All-Irelands: 5
- All Stars: 2

Tom O'Sullivan is a former Gaelic footballer from Rathmore County Kerry. A garda by profession, he played his club football for Rathmore and his county football for the Kerry county team.

== Playing career ==
=== Underage and junior ===
O'Sullivan never played football for Kerry in the All-Ireland Minor Football Championship. However, he was part of the Kerry Vocational Schools team that won the All Ireland in 1997.

He moved on to the Under 21 team in 1998 lining out at full back in the Munster semi final game with Clare, a game Kerry ran out winnings in a close game on a 0–10 to 0–07 scoreline. This set up a Munster Under-21 Football Championship final with Tipperary. In another close game Kerry ended on the right side of a 3–10 to 1–11 scoreline to give O'Sullivan a first Munster title in the grade. The All Ireland semi final paired Kerry with Ulster championships Armagh. Unlike during Munster Kerry ran out comfortable winners on a 1–14 to 0-09 point scoreline, with O'Sullivan once again at full back. This set up an All Ireland final with Laois. Despite fielding a number of players who had won All Ireland minor titles the 2 previous years O'Sullivan's side won 2–08 to 0–11 scoreline to give Kerry their 3 title in 4 years and a first for O'Sullivan. O'Sullivan was back in the no 3 jersey for the start of the 1999 championship as Kerry ran out easy winners in the first round on a 1–22 to 1–04 scoreline against Waterford. This set up a semi final with Limerick. Despite having appeared in 2 Munster minor finals in the years before Kerry had little trouble overcoming them on a 3–12 to 0–06 scoreline. That result set up a Munster final with Cork. Despite being closer than the first two games O'Sullivan's side still ran out comfortable 1–10 to 0–07 winners, giving O Sullivan his second Munster title. In the semi-final Kerry had yet another comfortable win this time over Roscommon on a 3–15 to 109 scoreline. In the final Kerry would face Leinster surprise package Weastmeath. Having not been tested all year Kerry went into the game as huge favorites. However at the final whistle Kerry found themselves at the wrong end of a 1–12 to 0–09 scoreline in one of the biggest shocks in the history of the championship. O'Sullivan played 9 games in total for the under 21s during his 2 years all at full back.

On the back of his displays with the under 21s O'Sullivan was picked for the Kerry junior side in 1998. He played full back in the Munster semi final as Kerry were held to an 0-11 each draw by Cork. In the replay Cork won by 0–15 to 0–13. He was back once more at full back in 1999, however this time Kerry fell to Clare by 0–10 to 0-06.

=== Senior ===
Tom O'Sullivan made his debut for the Kerry seniors against Cork in the 1999/2000 National Football League. He would go on to play in all 8 of Kerrys games as they lost out to Meath in the semi-final. His Munster Senior Football Championship debut came in 2000, also against Cork in the Munster semi final, a game where he played at Left half back, despite having played most of his intercounty football at full back. Kerry won the game 2–15 to 0–13. This paved the way for O'Sullivans first senior Munster final where his side took on Clare. In a one sided game Kerry ran out winners on a 3–15 to 0–08 scoreline. This set up a semi final and Croke Park debut with Ulster champions Armagh. In an exciting game the side were level at the end of 70 minutes 2-11 apace. The replay turned out to be yet another exciting contest, going to extra time with Kerry winning out on a 2–15 to 1–15 scoreline. This put Kerry back in the final for the first time since 1997, with Galway the opposition. Like the semi-final the two teams ended level after a close encounter on a 0-14 each scoreline. In the replay, again like the semi-final another close game played out with Kerry winning on a 0–17 to 1–10 scoreline, giving O'Sullivan his first All Ireland medal. In his debut season with Kerry O'Sullivan played 8 league and 6 championship games.

O'Sullivan missed some of Kerry's 2000/01 league campaign, playing in 5 of the 7 games, only starting two of them. He was back in the starting 15 for the first round of Munster where Kerry took on Tippereary, with him moving to right half back, where he would play for the season. Kerry started the defense of their Munster and All Ireland titles with a comfortable 3–17 to 1-04 hammering of Tipp. This set up a semi final with Limerick, in a game where Kerry again ran out comfortable 1–15 to 0–10 winners. This set up a first Munster final for O'Sullivan with Cork. In the end of a huge scoring game Kerry were winners on a 0–19 to 1–13 scoreline, giving O'Sullivan a second Munster title in a row. 2001 was the first year of the qualifier series meaning for the first time there was a quarter final stage, where Kerry met Dublin. In a first meeting for the sides since the golden days of the 1970s and 80s, the two sides played out a 1-14 easch draw in Thurles. A week later the two teams were back in Thurles and after another exciting game Kerry ran out winners on a 2–12 to 1–12 scoreline. That result set up an All Ireland semi final with Leinster champions Meath. Kerry went into the game as favorites but ended up on the wring side of a 2=14 to 0-5 hammering, a record in championship football for Kerry. At the end of a disappointing year for Kerry overall, O'Sullivan played 5 league and 6 championship games.

2002 seen Kerry find themselves in Div 2 of the National League. O'Sullivan again missed the early part of the campaign, but was back as Kerry beat Laois to take the title by 1–09 to 1-05, with O'Sullivan playing Right corner back. He was back in the half back line as Kerry opened their Munster title defense with a hard-fought win over Limerick. on a 0–14 to 1–07 scoreline. On a wet ran in Killarney a low scoring 0-08 a piece scoreline, meant the sides would have to meet again. In the replay Cork ran out winners on a 0–15 to 1–09 in a game where O'Sullivan would play his first championship game in the Kerry full back line, a line where he would for the rest of his intercounty career, when he played full back. Kerry faced into their first ever All-Ireland Qualifier game and a first game against Wicklow at championship level. For the first time in since his debut O'Sullivan would find himself on the bench, a role he would play for the rest of the year. He would play no part in what was to be a straightforward 5–15 to 0–07 win. This set up another first championship meeting for Kerry this time with Fermanagh. Another comfortable win was the result for Kerry, this time on a 2–15 to 0–04 scoreline. O'Sullivan managed to get some game time this time round coming off the bench to replace Eamonn Fitzmaurice. This set up a meeting with Kildare who had lost the Leinster final. In the first championship meeting for the sides since Kildare's surprise 98 semi final win Kerry made no mistake winning on a 2–10 to 1–05 scoreline, with O'Sullivan again coming off the bench to replace Eamonn Fitzmaurice once more. The win meant Kerry were back in Croke Park for a Q/F tie with All Ireland champions Galway. The Kingdom had too much for them and ran out comfortable winners on a 2–17 to 1–12 scoreline. O'Sullivan again appeared off the bench replacing, for the third game in a row, Eamonn Fitzmaurice. This set up a historic first championship meeting in Croke Park with old rivals Cork. After losing out in Munster Kerry made no mistake second time around and routed the Rebels on a 3–19 to 2–07 scoreline. O'Sullivan had a short stay on the field as he was sent off soon after replacing Marc Ó'Sé. This set up an All Ireland final with Armagh. Kerry looked to be in control when they led at half time but an early second half goal seen the Ulster side claim a first All Ireland on a 1–12 to 0–14 scoreline. He once again replaced Marc Ó'Sé during the game. O'Sullivan finished the year, where he largely played as a sub, playing in all but one of Kerrys 8 championship games, starting 3 and coming on as a sub for the other 5 he played in.

O'Sullivan started the 2003 season by playing in all 7 of Kerry's games, mostly in the full back line. He started his first championship games since the previous years Munster semi final loss to Cork, when he lined outed at left corner back against Tipperary, in a game Kerry ran out winners on a 0–025 to 1–10 scoreline. This set up a Munster final with Limerick, who had pulled off a shocked result with a 10 pint win over Cork in the semi-final. This would be the only season of his career where O'Sullivan wouldn't play Cork in championship football. Appearing in a first Munster final since 1991 Limerick pushed Kerry all the way, but came up short in the end on a 1–11 to 0–09 scoreline, giving O'Sullivan his third Munster medal. The result meant Kerry were back in Croke Park where they faced Roscommon in the All Ireland Q/F. Despite shipping 3 goals Kerry still did enough to run out 1–21 to 3–10 winners. This set up a semi final with Ulster champions Tyrone. Despite entering the game as favorites O'Sullivan's side were totally outclassed and they fell to a 0–13 to 0–06 loss. O'Sullivan finished the year playing at Left corner back in all 4 of Kerrys championship games.

After some disappointing losses in Croke Park over the previous three seasons, Jack O'Connor took over as manager replacing Páidí Ó Sé. O'Sullivan played in O'Connor's first game in charged, a surprise loss away to Longford in the league. He didn't appear again until the round 5 win over Westmeath, but kept his place as Kerry made the final for the first time since 1997. Kerry took on Galway in the final, and with O'Sullivan at left corner back ran out winners on a 3–11 to 1–16 scoreline, giving O'Sullivan a first National League title. O'Sullivan kept his place at left corner back as Kerry opened their Munster campaign away to Clare, Kerry came away with a retrain 2–10 to 0–09 win to set up a semi final date with Cork. In a very one-sided game in Killarney Kerry had too much for the opposition and ran out easy winners by 0–15 to 0-07. This set up, for the second year in a row, a Munster final date with Limerick. A last-gasp catch from a 45 from Darragh O Se meant the sides finished level on a 1-10 each scoreline, meaning they would have to face off once again a week later in Killarney. He was back at left corner back once again for the replay, where despite a shacking start Kerry won on a 3–10 to 2–09 scoreline, giving him a 4th Munster medal. This set up a QF clash with old foes Dublin in Croke Park. Once again lining out at Left corner back in a comfortable 1–15 to 1–08 win. For the third time in four seasons O'Sullivan and Kerry faced an Ulster side in the latter end of the championship, this time squaring up with Derry this time however Kerry end up on the rightside of a 1–17 to 1–11 scoreline. Kerry faced Mayo in the final in a first championship meeting for the sides since the 1997 final. In somewhat of a surprise Kerry ran out easy winners on a 1–20 to 2–09 scoreline, giving O'Sullivan a second All Ireland medal. O'Sullivan would finish off the year by picking up a first All Star at Left corner back. In what was to be his most successful season to date, O'Sullivan finished the year playing in all 7 of Kerry's championship games and 6 league games. He ended the year with a clean sweep of National League, Munster and All Ireland medals along with an All Star.

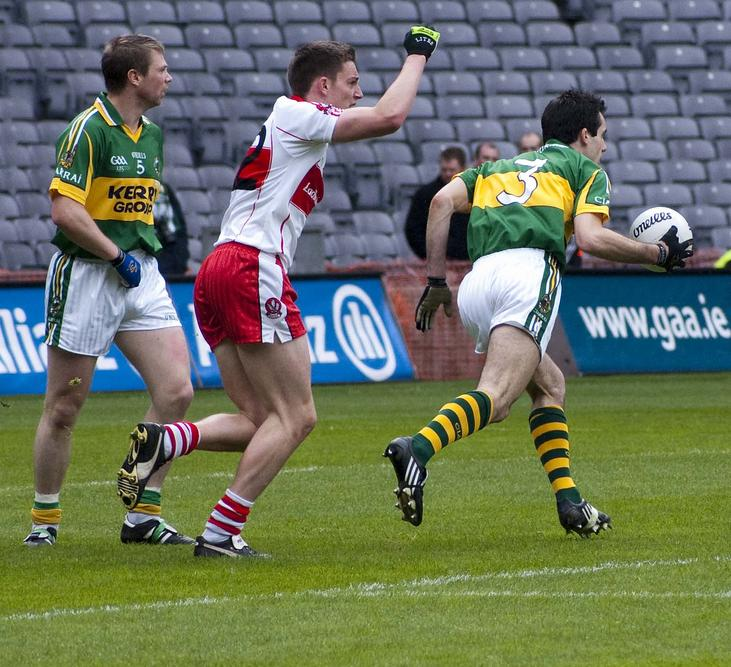
O'Sullivan (right) in action against Derry in the 2009 National League final

Kerry failed to defend their league title in 2005, just missing out on a semi final spot. O'Sullivan playing in all but one of the 7 games. Kerry kicked off the defense of their All Ireland title with a 2–22 to 0-13 Tipperary in Thurles, with O'Sullivan in his now established Corner Back slot. This set up a semi final with Lemrick, a side they had beaten in the previous two Munster finals. In another close game two Colm Cooper goals were the difference in a 2–10 to 0–10 win. The result was a first Munster final with Cork since 2001. In another close game in Cork it was a goal from Kerry captain Declan O'Sullivan that swing the tie in Kerrys favor as the game ended in a 1–10 to 0–10 win for Kerry and a first 3 in a row of Munster titles since 1996–98. The result also game O'Sullivan a 5th Munster title. In the All Ireland QF seen a repeat of the previous years All Ireland final where Kerry faced Mayo. In a much closer game then 2004 Kerry ran out winners on a 2–15 to 0–18 scoreline in what was to be a tough afternoon for O Sullivan where he was replaced by Eamonn Fitzmaurice. For the second time in 4 seasons Kerry faced off with Cork in Croke Park in the All Ireland semi final. Where only a few weeks before a single goal was between them this time around was a different story. Much like the 2002 semi final Kerry totally outclassed their rivals in a 1–19 to 0-09 hammering. This saw Kerry and O'Sullivan qualify for their 4th All Ireland final since 2000. It was a repeat of the 2003 semi final with Tyrone. In what was one of the games for the year, Tyrone once more had the upper hand and came out on top in a 1–16 to 2–10 scoreline. O'Sullivan ended his 6th season at senior level having played right corner back in all 6 of Kerry's championship games and 6 out of 7 league games.

O'Sullivan was known primarily as a corner-back, but has had to move to full-back since the retirement of Mike McCarthy. He coped very well in the early stages of the championship, being described as 'soundness personified at full back'. However, he struggled at times in the Munster final against Michael Cussen of Cork and in the All-Ireland quarter-final against Vincent Corey of Monaghan. Nevertheless, the year ended well for O'Sullivan, as Kerry beat Cork by 3–13 to 1–9 in the All-Ireland Final

== Honours ==
Intercounty

- All-Ireland Senior Football Championship 5: 2000, 2004, 2006, 2007, 2009
- All-Ireland Under-21 Football Championship 1: 1998
- Munster Senior Football Championship 8: 2000, 2001, 2003, 2004, 2005, 2007, 2010,2011
- Munster Under-21 Football Championship 2: 1998, 1999
- National Football League 2: 2004, 2006, 2009
- All Ireland Senior Football Final Man of the Match: 2009

Club

- Kerry Senior Football Championship 2: 1998, 1999 (With East Kerry)
- Kerry Club Football Championship 1: 2011
- County League Div 1 1: 2002
- Kerry Intermediate Football Championship 1: 1999
- Kerry Junior Football Championship 1: 1998
- East Kerry Senior Football Championship 1: 2005

Schools

- All-Ireland Vocational Schools Football Championship 1: 1997
- Munster Vocational Schools Championship 1: 1997

Individual

- All Stars (2004, 2009)
- All-Ireland Senior Football Championship Final Man of the Match (2009)

Awards
Preceded by Seán Cavanagh (Tyrone)	All-Ireland Senior Football Final; Man of the Match; 2009	Succeeded by Daniel Goulding (Cork)
