= Harry Keegan =

Irish Gaelic footballer

Personal information
- Born: 12 January 1952 (age 74)
- Occupation: Psychiatric nurse

Sport
- Sport: Gaelic football
- Position: Right corner-back
Clubs
- Years: Club
- ?–?: Castlerea St Kevin's; Fingallians
Inter-county
- Years: County
- 1972–1988: Roscommon
Inter-county titles
- Connacht titles: 5
- All-Irelands: 0
- NFL: 1
- All Stars: 3

Harry Keegan (born 12 January 1952) is an Irish former Gaelic footballer who played as a corner back for the Roscommon senior team.

Keegan made his debut for Roscommon in 1972 in a league game against Kilkenny, and was a regular member of the starting fifteen until his retirement in 1988.

During that time he won five Connacht Senior Football Championship medals, as well as three All-Star awards: in 1978, 1980 and 1986.

Keegan also won a National Football League medal in 1979, though injury prevented him from playing against Cork in the final.
