= Paul O'Kelly =

Irish Gaelic football manager

- Occupation(s): Business consultant, former Gaelic football manager and coach
- Known for: Strategic thinking and planning business consultant

Paul O'Kelly is a strategic thinking and planning business consultant who served as the manager of the senior Offaly county football team for seven months in 2003. O'Kelly has a strong background in sports and was asked by president of the Gaelic Athletic Association Nickey Brennan to develop the Strategic Vision and Action plan for the GAA after his time with the Offaly county football team.

== Involvement in sport in Ireland ==
During his college years O'Kelly suffered a knee injury which ended his Gaelic football career. He went on to study coaching and gained further skills which would lead him firstly into a career in sports coaching and, most recently, business consulting. At the age of 22, he coached St Bride's (Louth) senior football team to win the Cardinal O'Donnell Cup. After this success, O'Kelly became involved with coaching Edenderry football club. He worked with the underage teams initially and also held positions as secretary and treasurer of the club before coaching the senior team.

In 1985, O'Kelly led the Edenderry Gaelic football team to its first championship title in 28 years. He has also managed Round Towers of Clondalkin twice and Abbeylara of Longford. O'Kelly was involved with the Offaly senior football team in the late 1990s and was involved in coaching the Offaly team that won the 1997 Leinster Senior Football Championship and its first National Football League title in 1998. O'Kelly worked behind the scenes with several counties thereafter, as well as being on the Monaghan GAA management team.

Internationally, O'Kelly was retained by Cervélo when it was expanding its professional cycling team with the appointment of Joop Alberda of the Netherlands.

The Dubai Government retained O'Kelly to work with 17 sports leaders in the UAE on the Hamdam Bin Mohammed Programme for Sports Leadership led by Ohio University, USA.

He advised Irish sailors preparing for the 2012 Summer Olympics.

== Professional career ==
O'Kelly is the founding partner at O’KellySutton. Before establishing his own consulting company more than 20 years ago he was manager of European marketing for a US Fortune 200 company. In this role he was the first employee in Europe and established a highly profitable customer base in seven countries.

His consulting experience began with enabling Irish companies to build sales in international markets and US companies to establish a strong presence in Europe. Since then, he has worked in more than 20 countries, 30 US states and has helped open accounts with 300 of the Fortune 1000 companies. O'Kelly is currently working in Ireland, the UK, Holland, Switzerland, Africa, the Middle East and the USA and with subsidiaries in 15 countries and the five continents.

He is a board member of Atlantic Corridor Ireland, a body funded by the Irish Department of Foreign Affairs and Trade, which is building business and education links between the midlands of Ireland and regions in the United States.

Prior to the acquisition of Sunderland A.F.C., O'Kelly worked with Niall Quinn to develop a strategy for the development of football at Sunderland.
