= Michael Shields (footballer) =

Irish sportsperson (born 1986)

Personal information
- Native name: Mícheál Ó Siail (Irish)
- Nickname: Shields
- Born: 8 August 1986 (age 40) Cork, Ireland
- Height: 1.85 m (6 ft 1 in)

Sport
- Sport: Gaelic football
- Position: Full Back
Club
- Years: Club
- 2003–present: St Finbarr's
Club titles
- Cork titles: 2
- Munster titles: 1
Inter-county
- Years: County
- 2005–2017: Cork
Inter-county titles
- Munster titles: 3
- All-Irelands: 1
- NFL: 3
- All Stars: 2

Michael Shields (born 8 August 1986) is an Irish sportsperson. Born in Cork, he plays Gaelic football with his local club St Finbarr's and was a member at senior level of the Cork county football team from 2005.

He won an All-Ireland Senior Football Championship in 2010.

== Playing career ==
=== Club ===
Shields plays his club Gaelic football with the St Finbarr's club on the south side of Cork city. He first came to prominence on the club scene at underage levels; however, he experienced little success with the St Finbarr's minor or under-21 teams.

In 2007, after fifty years of playing in the top flight of the County Senior Football Championship, St Finbarr's were relegated to the intermediate level. This grade of football did not pose any problem to Shields's side, as they reached the final in 2008. St Vincent's provided the opposition on that occasion; however, 'the Barr's' were held to a draw. The replay a week later was more conclusive. St Finbarr's won by 2–13 to 0–14, giving Shields a County Premier Intermediate Championship winners' medal.

Following this promotion, St Finbarr's would lose consecutive Senior finals in 2009 & 2010 to Clonakilty and Nemo Rangers respectively. It was more heartbreak for the Blues in 2017 where again they lost to Nemo Rangers after a replay. These years of hurt finally came to an end in 2018 when the Barrs' beat Duhallow in the decider, giving Shields his first Senior county winners medal. St Finbarr's defeated Clonakilty in the 2021 final on a scoreline of 0-14 to 0-13, adding another county medal to his collection. Shields came on as a second-half substitute.

=== Minor and under-21 ===
Shields first came to prominence on the inter-county scene as a member of the Cork minor football team in 2004. That year Cork qualified for a Munster final showdown with arch-rivals Kerry. That game ended in a 0–9 apiece draw. Cork lost the second game by three points. In spite of this Cork were still in with a chance of claiming the All-Ireland title. A 1–9 apiece draw was the result of their All-Ireland quarter-final game against Laois. Shields did not participate in the replay which Laois won.

In 2005 Shields joined the Cork under-21 football team. He made his debut in a Munster quarter-final victory over Kerry. He lined out in the subsequent semi-final trouncing of Clare. Shields played no further part in the under-21 championship seasons. Cork went on to win the Munster title but lose the All-Ireland semi-final to Galway.

In 2006 Shields had established himself on the starting fifteen of the Cork under-21 team. He lined out in the provincial decider that year against Waterford; however, the Decies were no match for 'the Rebels'. A 4–14 to 1–6 trouncing gave Cork the victory and gave Shields a first |Munster under-21 winners' medal on the field of play. Cork later manoeuvred through the All-Ireland series and reached the All-Ireland final against Mayo. That game was a close affair; however, at the final whistle Cork were defeated by just two points.

In 2007 Shields was in his last year as a member of the Cork under-21 team. He lined out in the provincial decider that year against Tipperary and a high-scoring and exciting game developed. Cork won by 3–19 to 3–12 and Shields added a second Munster under-21 winners' medal to his collection. Cork later reached the All-Ireland final against Laois. Another close and exciting game of football developed as neither side took a decisive lead. Colm O'Neill and Daniel Goulding combined to score two goals and to help Cork to a narrow 2–10 to 0–15 victory. It was Shields's first All-Ireland winners' medal at under-21 level.

=== Senior ===
After impressing in some challenge and McGrath Cup games in 2005, Shields was handed his senior championship debut in the 2006 Munster final against Kerry. That game ended in a 0–10 apiece draw. The replay saw a much fresher Cork team surprisingly defeat Kerry by 1–12 to 0–9. James Masters proved the hero of the day, as he scored 1–7. Shields had secured his first Munster winners' medal in the senior grade. The quirks of the championship saw Cork face Kerry again in the subsequent All-Ireland semi-final for the third time in five seasons. In a similar pattern to previous encounters Cork failed to beat Kerry at Croke Park. A 0–16 to 0–10 resulted in Cork being knocked out of the championship.

In 2007 Cork were out to atone for their defeats by Kerry the previous year. Both sides met in the provincial decider for the third year in succession. Cork gave a good account of themselves; however, Kerry could not be beaten and Shields's side went down on a 1–15 to 1–13 score line. Cork later did well in the subsequent All-Ireland series and finally qualified for the All-Ireland final after an eight-year absence. In a cruel twist Kerry were the opponents. While the first half was played on an even keel, 'the Kingdom' ran riot in the second half and a rout ensued. Goalkeeper Alan Quirke came in for much criticism after conceding some easy goals. At the full-time whistle Cork were trounced by 3–13 to 1–9.

The following year Shields missed the start of the championship because of his Australian sojourn. He returned in time for Cork's All-Ireland quarter-final meeting with Kildare. He came on as a substitute in that victory. Cork faced Kerry once again in the subsequent All-Ireland semi-final; however, after a thrilling draw and a replay Kerry were the team that advanced to the championship decider.

In 2009 Shields was installed as Cork's first-choice full-back. After a defeat of Kerry in a replay of the Munster semi-final, Cork subsequently faced Limerick in the Munster final. Cork were the red-hot favourites going into the game; however, Limerick put Cork to the pin of their collars. After a slow start 'the Rebels' settled and eventually secured a narrow 2–6 to 0–11 victory. It was Shield's second Munster title. Cork later defeated Donegal to set up an All-Ireland semi-final meeting with reigning All-Ireland champions Tyrone. In 2010 he was captain of the Cork team that won the National Football League Div 1 Tile with a won over Mayo in the final at Croke Park.

In 2010 Shields was still seen as a key member of Cork's full-back line. A defeat by Kerry in a replay of the provincial semi-final resulted in Cork being exiled to the All-Ireland qualifiers. After negotiating their way through a difficult series of games, Cork defeated Dublin to qualify for their third All-Ireland final in four years. Down provided the opposition on that occasion in the first meeting between these two teams since 1994. Cork got off to a lightning start; however, they eased off and trailed by three points at the interval. Cork stretched the lead to three points in the second half; however, Down fought back. At the full-time whistle Cork were the champions by 0–16 to 0–15 and Shields picked up an All-Ireland winners' medal.

=== Inter-provincial ===
Shields also lined out with Munster in the inter-provincial series of games; however, he hexperienced little success. He first lined out with his province in 2006 when Munster were drawn to play Connacht in the semi-final. That was an eventful game, featuring a period of extra-time. In the end victory went to the westerners by 1–15 to 2–10.

Shields was included on the Munster panel again in 2007. That year Munster reached the Railway Cup final against Ulster; however, the northern province emerged victorious by 1–12 to 1–8.

=== Australian rules ===
In November 2007, following a successful three-week trial with top level Australian rules football club Carlton, Shields signed a two-year international rookie contract, becoming the third Cork native to sign with the club, joining former hurlers Setanta and Aisake Ó hAilpín. After the first half of the season, however, he decided to return to Ireland in July 2008, saying he "missed home" and Australian rules football "wasn't for him".

=== International rules ===
Shields played twice for Ireland against Australia in the 2013 International Rules Series.

=== Schools ===
He helped his school Coláiste an Spioraid Naoimh from Bishopstown to win the Corn Uí Mhuirí title in 2005 the first in the school's history.

=== College ===
He played for UCC in the Sigerson Cup. He played in the 2010 final but was on the losing side it DCU.

== Honours ==
Coláiste an Spioraid Naoimh

- Corn Uí Mhuirí (1): 2005

St Finbarr's

- Cork Senior Football Championship (2): 2018, 2021
- Munster Senior Club Football Championship (1): 2021
- Cork Intermediate Football Championship (1): 2008
- Kelleher Shield (Senior Football League) (1): 2019

Cork

- All-Ireland Senior Football Championship (1): 2010
- Munster Senior Football Championship (3): 2006, 2009, 2012
- National Football League (3): 2010 (c), 2011 (c), 2012 (c)
- National Football League, Division 2 (1): 2009
- All-Ireland Under-21 Football Championship (1): 2007
- Munster Under-21 Football Championship (2): 2006, 2007

Individual

- All Star (2): 2009, 2010

Awards and achievements
Preceded by Darran O'Sullivan (Kerry)	National Football League Final (Div 1) winning captain 2010–2011	Succeeded by Graham Canty (Cork)
