= Colm McAlarney =

Irish Gaelic footballer

Personal information
- Born: Dún Laoghaire, Dublin Ireland
- Occupation: Teacher

Sport
- Sport: Gaelic football
- Position: Midfield
Clubs
- Years: Club
- 1965-1983: 1965-1977 Liatroim Fontenoys; 1977-1983 Castlewellan
Club titles
- Down titles: 2
- Ulster titles: 0
- All-Ireland Titles: 0
Inter-county
- Years: County
- 1966-1981: Down
Inter-county titles
- Ulster titles: 4
- All-Irelands: 1
- NFL: 1
- All Stars: 2

Colm McAlarney born 1948 in Dún Laoghaire, Dublin, is a former Irish sportsperson.

== Gaelic football ==
He played Gaelic football with his local clubs Liatroim Fontenoys and Castlewellan and was a member of the Down senior inter-county team from the 1960s until the 1980s. McAlarney is the only player to have won Railway Cup winners' medals in each of three decades. Colm was center back on the Down minor team that lost the All-Ireland Minor Final in 1966. He played midfield for the All-Ireland winning Down senior team of 1968, who defeated Kerry in the final. He was awarded man of the match for his performance in the 1968 All-Ireland final.
