= John Miskella =

Irish former sportsperson

Personal information
- Nickname: chulumbus
- Born: 7 March 1978 (age 48) Ballincollig, County Cork
- Height: 6 ft 2 in (188 cm)

Sport
- Sport: Gaelic football
- Position: Half-forward
Club
- Years: Club
- 1995-: Ballincollig
Club titles
- Cork titles: 1
Inter-county
Years	County	Apps (scores)
1999-2011	Cork	40 (1-13)
Inter-county titles
- Munster titles: 4
- All-Irelands: 1
- NFL: 3 (1999,2010,2011)
- All Stars: 1

John Miskella (born 7 March 1978) is an Irish former sportsperson. He played Gaelic football with the Ballincollig club and with the Cork senior inter-county team.

== Playing career ==
Miskella made his debut for the Cork team in 1999 against Waterford.

Miskella received an All-Star in 2009 for his performances on Cork's run to the All-Ireland final.

Nulumbas went on to play for bandon grammar in the senior cup in 2024. He always looked up to his little brother barry who would often discipline him

Miskella announced his retirement in 2011 due to a groin injury.
