= Pearse O'Neill =

Irish Gaelic footballer

Personal information
- Native name: Piarsas Ó Néill (Irish)
- Nickname: Pee Wee
- Born: 1 December 1979 (age 46) Cork, Ireland
- Occupation: Accountant
- Height: 1.95 m (6 ft 5 in)

Sport
- Sport: Gaelic Football
- Position: Centre forward
Club
- Years: Club
- 1996-: Aghada
Inter-county
- Years: County
- 2006-2013: Cork
Inter-county titles
- Munster titles: 4
- All-Irelands: 1
- NFL: 1
- All Stars: 1

Pearse O'Neill (born 1 December 1979) is an Irish sportsperson. He plays Gaelic football with his local club Aghada and was a member of the Cork senior inter-county team between 2006 and 2013, when he announced his retirement from inter-county football.
