= Diarmuid Murphy =

Kerry Gaelic footballer

Personal information
- Native name: Diarmuid Ó Murchú (Irish)
- Born: 22 August 1975 (age 51) Dingle, County Kerry
- Occupation: Insurance Branch Manager
- Height: 6 ft 3 in (191 cm)

Sport
- Sport: Gaelic football
- Position: Goalkeeper
Club
- Years: Club
- 1993-present: Dingle GAA
Inter-county
Years	County	Apps (scores)
2002–2009	Kerry	41 (0–0)
Inter-county titles
- Munster titles: 4
- All-Irelands: 4
- NFL: 3
- All Stars: 3

Diarmuid Murphy (born 22 August 1975 in Dingle, County Kerry) is an Irish Gaelic footballer who plays for his local club Dingle and was the goalkeeper at senior level on the Kerry county football team from 2004 until 2009.

== Playing career ==
=== Under 21 ===
Murphy was part of the Kerry Under 21 team in 1994 but lost out to Cork in the Munster championship.

He was still underage in 1995. He played no part in the Munster championship winning campaign, but returned to the team for the All-Ireland semi-final with Donegal that Kerry won. Murphy was the team's captain for the All-Ireland final with Mayo. The game ended in a 2-12 to 3-09 draw, Kerry won the re-play 3-10 to 1-12 to give Murphy an All-Ireland title as captain. In his final year at the Under 21 grade Murphy picked up a Munster title after a win over Clare in the final. Kerry later qualified for another All-Ireland final with Cavan and another win gave Murphy a second All-Ireland medal.

=== Junior ===
After success at Under 21 level Murphy joined the Kerry Junior side in 1997. He won a Munster title after overcoming Clare in the final. Kerry faced Mayo in the All-Ireland final. However Murphy and co came up short on a 2-08 to 1-10 scoreline.

He again lined out with the county junior side in 2000. He won a second Munster title after overcoming Clare once again. The All-Ireland final seen Kerry face another Connachat team in the shape of Roscommon. There was to be no joy once more as Kerry lost out 0-14 to 0-11.

He again lined out in 2001 but Kerry lost out to Tipperary in the first round of the Munster championship.

=== Senior ===
Murphy first joined the Kerry senior panel in 2001 as back up for Declan O'Keeffe. Murphy played during the National Football League in 2002 and 2003, but remained as the sub for the championship.

2004 saw Jack O'Connor take over as manager of the Kerry team. He was not the only change in personnel, as Murphy replaced Declan O'Keeffe as the first-choice goalkeeper on the team after the first round of the league when Kerry had a surprise loss to Longford. The year began well with Kerry reaching the final of the National League. An exciting 3-11 to 1-6 victory saw Kerry claim the title and Murphy picked up a first National Football League winners’ medal. 'The Kingdom' subsequently booked their almost annual spot in the provincial final and, for the second year in succession, Limerick were the opponents. Surprisingly, that game ended in a 1-10 apiece draw. The replay was also a close-run affair; however, Kerry never really looked in danger of losing. A 3-10 to 2-09 victory gave Murphy a Munster winners’ medal. The All-Ireland series proved no difficulty for Kerry, and ‘the Kingdom’ booked their place in the All-Ireland final against Mayo. An early goal from Alan Dillon gave the Connacht men some hope, however, the game was effectively over after twenty-five minutes when Colm Cooper scored Kerry's only goal of the day. The points kept coming from Murphy's team and an injury-time Michael Conroy goal was nothing but a consolation for Mayo. A 1-20 to 2-09 victory gave Murphy his first All-Ireland winners’ medal. Murphy was later presented with his first All-Star award.

In 2005 Kerry were hot favourites to retain their All-Ireland title. All was going to plan as Murphy's side reached yet another provincial final. In a return to tradition, Cork were the opponents. A close game developed, however, in the end Kerry were the narrow winners by 1-11 to 0-11. It was Murphy's second Munster winners’ medal. Following this win Kerry cruised through the All-Ireland series to reach another championship decider with Tyrone providing the opposition. In one of the great finals of the decade, the result remained in doubt until the final whistle. Dara Ó Cinnéide powered his team ahead with a goal after just six minutes. Tyrone responded in kind with a Peter Canavan goal just before half-time. Tomás Ó Sé launched the Kerry comeback in the 57th minute with Kerry's second goal; however, it was too late. Tyrone hung on to win by 1-16 to 2-10. It was Murphy's first defeat in an All-Ireland final. In spite of losing the All-Ireland Murphy was later presented with a second All-Star award.

In 2006 Kerry reached the final of the National League and played Galway. Murphy's side could only manage three points in the opening half, however, the introduction of Eoin Brosnan transformed the team. At the end of the seventy minutes a 2-12 to 0-10 score line gave Kerry their 18th National League title. The league win was a false dawn as Kerry went out tamely to Cork in a replay of the Munster final. The team, however, bounced back against Longford to set up a meeting with Armagh in the All-Ireland quarter-final. At half-time it looked as though the Ulser hoodoo would strike again but Kerry blitzed the men from the orchard county in the second half with Darragh Ó Sé dominating midfield while Kieran Donaghy shone at full-forward. They won by a score of 3-15 to 1-13, in the process putting an end to the notion that Kerry had no answer to the northern style of defensive play. Kerry again beat Cork in the subsequent semi-final before lining out against Mayo in the All-Ireland final. An unbelievable opening first-half saw Kerry go 2-4 to no score ahead after just ten minutes, courtesy of goals by Declan O'Sullivan and Kieran Donaghy goals. Colm Cooper slotted a third Kerry goal, however, Mayo settled and reduced the deficit to 3-8 to 3-2 at half-time. The second thirty-five minutes saw Kerry run riot while the westerners could only muster three points. A final score of 4-15 to 3-5 gave Kerry another All-Ireland title and gave Murphy a second All-Ireland winners' medal.

In 2007 Kerry faced Cork in the provincial decider once again. A close game developed, however, at the full-time whistle Kerry were the champions by 1-15 to 1-13. It was Murphy's third Munster winners' medal. Kerry then had the narrowest of victories in their All-Ireland quarter-final against Monaghan, setting up a glamour All-Ireland semi-final tie with Dublin. Murphy's side saw off a Dublin comeback and went on to win by two points. The subsequent All-Ireland final was an historic occasion as Kerry faced Cork in the very first all-Munster championship decider. While the first-half was played on an even keel, 'the Kingdom' ran riot in the second-half and a rout ensued. Cork goalkeeper Alan Quirke came in for much criticism after conceding some easy goals. At the full-time whistle Cork were trounced by 3-13 to 1-9. It was a third All-Ireland medal for Murphy.

In 2008 Kerry launched an all-out attack in their pursuit of a third All-Ireland title in-a-row. All did not go to plan as Murphy's side lost team captain Paul Galvin to suspension after an incident with referee Paddy Russell in the Munster semi-final against Clare. The subsequent Munster final saw Kerry take an eight-point lead over Cork at half-time. 'The Rebels' fought back and, in a massive downpour, Kerry could only muster three points in the second period of play as Cork secured a remarkable 1-16 to 1-11 victory. Murphy's side worked their way through to the All-Ireland semi-final where they faced Cork once again. 'The Kingdom' were much better in this encounter, however, the game ended in an astonishing draw. Kerry won the replay after another great comeback by Cork. An All-Ireland final appearance against Tyrone was the reward for this victory, with Murphy lining out in goals again. An exciting game developed, one that was more competitive than the routs that had taken place at the same stage of the championship over the previous two years. The sides were level seven times before Colm Cooper nudged Kerry 0-8 to 0-7 ahead before the interval. Tyrone simply wore Kerry into the ground in the second-half as a priceless goal from Tommy McGuigan and a string of late points inspired Tyrone to their third All-Ireland title of the decade.

In 2009 speculation was mounting that Murphy was approaching the end of his career. In spite of this he had one of his best seasons in the green and gold. He picked up a third National League winners' medal after a final victory over Derry. Kerry's next game was a Munster semi-final meeting with Cork. That game ended in a draw, however, Kerry were well beaten in the replay. 'The Kingdom' were subsequently banished to the qualifiers where they had some unimpressive wins over Longford, Sligo and Antrim. On several occasions it was Murphy's goalkeeping that kept Kerry in the championship. 'The Kingdom' later lined out in the All-Ireland quarter-final and thrashed Dublin before overcoming Meath in a disappointing semi-final. The subsequent All-Ireland final saw Kerry face Cork for the third time in that year's championship. Murphy's side entered the game as slight underdogs, however, they had the trump card of having never lost a game to Cork at Croke Park. Kerry stuttered in the opening period and trailed by 0-1 to 1-3 early in the first-half. The Kerry team stuck to their gameplan while Cork recorded fourteen wides. At the full-time whistle Kerry were the champions again by 0-16 to 1-9. It was Murphy's fourth All-Ireland winners' medal. His contribution to the championship was later recognised when he picked up a third and final All-Star award.

In January 2010 Murphy became the first high-profile Kerry star to announce his retirement from inter-county football due to a back problem. He was followed into retirement a month later by midfielder Darragh Ó Sé. Murphy was replaced on the Kerry team by Brendan Kealy.

=== Selector ===
In August 2010, it was announced that Murphy would join the Kerry management as a selector under coach Jack O'Connor.

In 2011, then Kerry manager Jack O'Connor brought him in as a selector to replace former teammate Éamonn Fitzmaurice. He continued as a selector under the management of Fitzmaurice when Fitzmaurice took over the Kerry senior football team.

Murphy was involved as a selector when O'Connor returned as Kerry manager in 2021. He spent three years working with O'Connor but left at the end of the 2024 season.

== Honours ==
=== Dingle ===
- Kerry Intermediate Football Championship:
  - Winner (2): 1997, 2004
  - Runner-up (2): 1998, 2002

=== Kerry ===
- All-Ireland Senior Football Championship:
  - Winner (4): 2004, 2006, 2007, 2009
  - Runner-up (2): 2005, 2008
- Munster Senior Football Championship:
  - Winner (3): 2004, 2005, 2007
  - Runner-up (2): 2006, 2008
- National Football League (Division 1):
  - Winner (3): 2004, 2006, 2009
- All-Ireland Under-21 Football Championship:
  - Winner (1): 1995 (C), 1996
- Munster Under-21 Football Championship:
  - Winner (2): 1995 (C), 1996
- Munster Junior Football Championship:
  - Winner (2):1997, 2000
- All-Ireland Junior Football Championship:
  - Runner Up (2):1997, 2000
