= Mike McCarthy (Gaelic footballer) =

Kerry Gaelic footballer

Personal information
- Born: County Kerry, Ireland

Sport
- Sport: Gaelic football
- Position: Full Back
Club
- Years: Club
- Kilcummin
Inter-county
Years	County	Apps (scores)
1999–2006 2009–2010	Kerry; Kerry	47 (0–1); 9 (0–0)
Inter-county titles
- Munster titles: 5
- All-Irelands: 4
- All Stars: 3

Mike McCarthy is a Gaelic footballer who played with the Kerry senior football team and at club level with Kilcummin in County Kerry. He is a draftsman by profession.

== Playing career ==
McCarthy won the All-Ireland U21 football championship with Kerry in 1998.

Although he didn't play at club level as a full‑back, McCarthy nevertheless established himself as a specialist in the Kerry full‑back line.

McCarthy won the All-Ireland senior football championship with Kerry on four occasions, in 2000, 2004, 2006 and again in 2009. One month after the 2006 victory over Mayo, at age 28, he announced his retirement from inter‑county football. In July 2009, McCarthy came out of his self‑imposed retirement and returned to win his fourth title that year. He retired for a second and final time from inter-county football in October 2010.

During his inter-county playing career, McCarthy won two NFL division one titles with Kerry in 2004 and 2006. He has three All-Stars which were awarded in 2000, 2004 and 2005.

== Personal life ==
McCarthy works as a draftsman.

== Honours ==
Intercounty

- All-Ireland Senior Football Championship (4): 2000, 2004, 2006, 2009
- All-Ireland Under-21 Football Championship 1: 1998
- Munster Senior Football Championship (6): 2000, 2001, 2003, 2004, 2005, 2010
- Munster Under-21 Football Championship (2): 1998, 1999
- National Football League (2): 2004, 2006

Individual

- All Stars (2000, 2004, 2005)
