= Declan O'Keeffe =

Kerry Gaelic footballer

Personal information
- Native name: Déaglán Ó Cuív (Irish)
- Occupation: Garda Síochána

Sport
- Sport: Gaelic football
- Position: Goalkeeper
Clubs
- Years: Club
- 1990–2005 2005–present: Rathmore; Clooney/Quin; St Joseph's Doora-Barefield
Club titles
- Kerry titles: 3
Inter-county
Years	County	Apps (scores)
1996–2003	Kerry	39 (0–0)
Inter-county titles
- Munster titles: 6
- All-Irelands: 2
- NFL: 1
- All Stars: 2

Declan O'Keeffe is an Irish former Gaelic footballer who played at various times with his local clubs Rathmore in Kerry and Clooney/Quin and St Josephs Doora-Barefield in Clare. He was a member at senior level of the Kerry county team from 1996 until 2003.

== Club ==
O'Keeffe played at various times with his local clubs Rathmore in Kerry and Clooney/Quin and St Josephs Doora-Barefield in Clare. He also lined out with divisional side East Kerry.

With Rathmore he had much success. He won a Kerry Junior Football Championship title in 1997, having been a Runner Up in 1993 and 1996. He later added a Kerry Intermediate Football Championship in 1999. He also added a Kerry County Football League Division 1 title in 2002. He won three Kerry Senior Football Championship titles with East Kerry in 1997, 1998 and 1999.

After moving to Clare he lined out in back to back Clare Senior Football Championship final in 2011 and 2012 with St Josephs Doora-Barefield.

== Schools ==
O'Keeffe lined out with the Kerry Vocational Schools team in the early 90's. In 1990 he won an All-Ireland Vocational Schools Championship title after a win over Cavan in the final.

== Underage ==
Minor

On the back of his displays with the Kerry Vocational Schools team he was also picked for the Kerry minor team in 1990. Kerry won against Tipperary, Clare and Cork as he added a Munster Minor Football Championship title to his collection. Kerry needed a replay to get over Galway in the All-Ireland semi-final. In the final O'Keeffe and co where on the losing side to Meath.

Under 21

O'Keeffe joined the Kerry Under 21 team in 1992. Kerry won against Limerick. Waterford and Cork on the way to add a Munster Under-21 Football Championship title for him. O'Keeffe and Kerry's campaign came to an end at the semi-final stage after a loss to Tyrone.

He was again part of the team in 1993. He picked up his second Munster title after wins over Cork and Waterford. A win over Galway in the semi-final seen the Kerrymen to a step more to qualify for the final. The All-Ireland final was a repeat of the 1990 Minor final with Meath. Like in 90 O'Keeffe was again on the losing side.

== Junior ==
On the back of his underage displays he joined the Kerry Junior team.

He first lined out with the team in 1993. A loss to Cork in the semi-final was his lot however.

He was again part of the team in 1994 and would have more success. Wins over Cork and Clare seen him pick up a Munster Junior Football Championship title. A semi-final win over Dublin seen O'Keeffe and co qualify for the final. In the final Kerry faced Galway. Having been an All-Ireland Runner-up at minor and Under 21 level O'Keeffe got his hands on an All-Ireland Junior Football Championship title after a 0–15 to 0–04 win.

== Senior ==
Páidí Ó Sé brought him into the Kerry senior panel for the 1995–96 National Football League He made his championship debut in a Munster championship quarter-final over Tipperary. A semi-final win over Waterford seen O'Keeffe and co qualify for the final. His first Munster senior final was against Cork. A 0–14 to 0–12 win seen him add a senior title to his collection. In the All-Ireland final Kerry faced Mayo. It was many of the Kerry sides first game in Croke Park and Mayo had too much for the young Kingdom side on a 2–13 to 1–10 scoreline.

He would play in the last three games 1996-97 National League including the win over Cork in the final. A Munster semi-final was over Tipperary seen Kerry qualify for the final where they faced Clare. O'Keeffe picked up his second Munster Senior Football Championship title after a 1–17 to 1–10 scoreline. A win over Cavan in the All-Ireland semi-final seen Kerry qualify for a first All-Ireland final since 1986. In the final a masterclass from Maurice Fitzgerald seen Kerry take the title on a 0–13 to 1–07 scoreline and an All-Ireland medal for O'Keeffe. He was also later awarded with an All-Star for his displays during the championship.

After an indifferent 1997–98 National Football League O'Keeffee and co qualified for another Munster final after a semi-final win over Cork. In the final Kerry faced Tipperary and he picked up a third Munster title in a row after a 0–17 to 1–10 win. In the All-Ireland semi-final Kerry faced surprise Leinster champions Kildare. Kildare had already seen off two of the last three All-Ireland winners on route to the semi-final and despite being underdogs the Kerrymen fell to a 0–13 to 1–09 loss.

Wins over Tipperary and Clare seen O'Keeffe line out in his fourth Munster final in a row. Few could have foreseen how the final with Cork would go. Despite a good start Kerry lost out on a 2–10 to 2–04 scoreline.

In 2000 Kerry overcame Cork in the Munster semi-final. The win seen O'Keeffe line out in his fifth Munster final and a repeat of 1997 against Clare. A 3–15 to 0–08 win seen him pick up his fourth Munster title. The All-Ireland semi-final would see Kerry face Armagh. The sides couldn't be separated and played out a 2-11 each draw. The replay would be another classic as extra time was needed before OKeeffe and co ran out winners 2–15 to 1–15. O'Keefee lined out in his second All-Ireland final as Kerry faced Galway. Like the semi-final the team couldn't be separated and played out a 0-14 each draw. In the replay O'Keeffe picked up his second All-Ireland title after a 0–17 to 1–10 win. He also won his second All-Star award.

In 2001 wins over Tipperary and Limerick seen O'Keeffe line out in yet another Munster final. A 0–19 to 1–13 win seen him pick up his fifth Munster title. In the first year of the back door Kerry faced old fous Dublin in the quarter-final. The sides played out an exciting 1-14 each draw in Thurles. Kerry faced into the All Ireland semi-final in confident mood when they faced Meath, who themselves had needed a replay to overcome Westmeath in their quarter-final tie. Meath ran out easy winners on a 2–14 to 0–05 scoreline, a result that was Kerry's heaviest championship defeat.

In 2002 Kerry found themselves in Division 2 of the 2002 National Football League. He played in all bar one game including the final win over Laois. The game with Louth was notable as O'Keeffe scored a point from a 45. He was again between the posts in a shacking 0–14 to 1–07 win over Limerick in the Munster quarter-final. This set up a semi-final with Cork. On a wet ran in Killarney a low-scoring 0–08 a piece scoreline, with Crowley scoring a point, meant the sides would have to meet again. In the replay Cork ran out winners on a 0–15 to 1–09. The result would see O'Keeffe failing to line out in a Munster final for the first, and only, time. Kerry faced their first ever All-Ireland Qualifier game and a first game against Wicklow at championship level. O'Keeffe and co had little trouble picking up a 5–15 to 0–07 win. This set up another first championship meeting for Kerry, this time with Fermanagh. Kerry had another comfortable win, this time on a 2–15 to 0–04 scoreline. This set up a meeting with Kildare, who had lost the Leinster final. In the first championship meeting for the sides since Kildare's surprise 1998 semi-final win, Kerry won on a 2–10 to 1–05 scoreline. The win meant Kerry were back in Croke Park for a quarter-final tie with All Ireland champions Galway. The Kingdom ran out comfortable winners on a 2–17 to 1–12 scoreline and were right back in the hunt for another All-Ireland title. This set up a historic first championship meeting in Croke Park with old rivals Cork. After losing out in Munster, Kerry routed the Rebels on a 3–19 to 2–07 scoreline. This set up an All Ireland final with Armagh. Kerry looked to be in control after he saved a penalty from Oisín McConville and they led at half time, but an early second-half goal saw the Ulster side claim a first All Ireland on a 1–12 to 0–14 scoreline.

He only played in three games during the 2003 National Football League. Despite this he was back as number one for the championship. A semi-final win over Tipperary in Tralee seen him qualify for another Munster final. For the first and only time in his career he wouldn't face Cork in the championship. Instead it was surprise package Limerick in the final. Despite a good showing from Limerick it wasn't enough as O'Keeffe picked up his sixth and final Munster title. In the All-Ireland quarter-final Kerry faced Roscommon. Despite winning the game it wasn't the best of days for O'Keeffe as Roscommon scored three goals, the only such time it happened during his career. In the All-Ireland semi-final Kerry came into the clash with Tyrone as favorites. However O'Keeffe and co had no answer for the Ulster champions as they won out on a 0–13 to 0–06 scoreline. This would be his final championship appearance.

In 2004 for the first time in his senior career he wouldn't be managed by Páidí Ó Sé. Despite this new boss Jack O'Connor picked him for his first game in charge. It wasn't to be a good start as Kerry had a surprise loss to Longford. This would turn out to be O'Keeffe last in a Kerry jersey.

O'Keeffe was Clare senior football team goalkeeping coach until the end of the 2022 season.
