= John Keane (Gaelic footballer) =

Westmeath Gaelic footballer

Personal information
- Native name: Seán Ó Catháin (Irish)
- Born: 1980 (age 45–46) Athlone, Ireland
- Occupation: Teacher

Sport
- Sport: Gaelic football
- Position: Left Corner Back
Club
- Years: Club
- Rosemount
Inter-county
- Years: County
- 2000-2009: Westmeath
Inter-county titles
- Leinster titles: 1
- NFL: 3
- All Stars: 2

John Keane is a former Gaelic footballer who played for the Westmeath county team. He was awarded an All Star for his performances with Westmeath in 2008. This was his second All Star, also winning an award in 2004. He was part of the Weastmeath team that won the county's first Leinster Senior Football Championship in 2004.

Jack Cooney appointed Keane to his Westmeath senior management team ahead of the 2022 season, with Keane also having been included in Cooney's proposed backroom team in 2014 when Cooney did not secure the post.
