= David Harte (Gaelic footballer) =

Tyrone Gaelic footballer

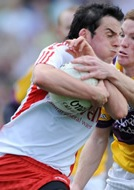
- David Harte in action for Tyrone in 2008

Personal information
- Native name: Daithí Ó hAirt (Irish)
- Born: 23 December 1981 (age 44) County Tyrone
- Occupation: Teacher
- Height: 1.78 m (5 ft 10 in)

Sport
- Sport: Gaelic football
- Position: Right Half Back
Club
- Years: Club
- Errigal Ciarán
Club titles
- Tyrone titles: 2
- Ulster titles: 1
Inter-county
- Years: County
- 2005-: Tyrone
Inter-county titles
- Ulster titles: 3
- All-Irelands: 2

David Harte (born 23 December 1981) is a Gaelic footballer who plays for the Errigal Ciarán club and for the Tyrone county team.

He was a member of the All-Ireland winning side of 2005 and also of the All-Ireland winning team of 2008. Harte plays his club football with Errigal Ciarán and has won two Tyrone Senior Football Championships and the Ulster Senior Football Championship with them.

He is one of the attack-minded defenders on the Tyrone panel, such as Ryan McMenamin. He is the nephew of Mickey Harte, who was Tyrone manager during his playing days.
