= Philip Jordan =

Irish Gaelic footballer

Personal information
- Born: 3 May 1980 (age 46) County Tyrone
- Occupation: Accountant
- Height: 1.80 m (5 ft 11 in)

Sport
- Sport: Gaelic football
- Position: Left half back
Club
- Years: Club
- Moy
Inter-county
Years	County	Apps (scores)
2002–2011	Tyrone	37
Inter-county titles
- Ulster titles: 4
- All-Irelands: 3
- NFL: 2
- All Stars: 4

Philip Jordan is an Irish Gaelic footballer who plays for the Moy club and, formerly, the Tyrone county team.

Jordan was an important member of the Tyrone team who won their first three All-Ireland titles in 2003, 2005 and 2008. His consistent and energetic performances also earned him All-Star awards in 2003, 2005, 2008 and 2010.

There was controversy surrounding his participation in the Tyrone team leading up to the Championship in 2011, and he ruled himself out of matches in the National Football League with rumours circulating that he had announced his retirement. Towards the end of April, however, he pledged to commit to the team for the remainder of the year, explaining that he needed time to assess if he "had the hunger" to go for another season. Jordan announced his retirement from inter-county football on 2 November 2011.
