= Dingle CBS =

Location
- Dingle, County Kerry

Information
- Type: secondary school
- Established: 1846
- Principal: Pádraig Firtéar
- Faculty: approx 20
- Website: http://www.cbs-daingean.com

Dingle CBS (Meánscoil na mBráithre Críostaí in Irish) was a secondary School in the County Kerry town of Dingle. It opened in 1846 by the Christian Brothers. The school closed at the end of the 2006/07 school year.

== Notable past pupils ==
Recent Kerry Footballers: Marc, Tomás and Darragh Ó Sé, Tommy Griffin, Diarmuid Murphy, Rónán Ó Flatharta
Former Kerry Footballers: Aodán Mac Gearailt, Dara Ó Cinnéide, Páidí Ó Sé

Others: Micheál Ó Muircheartaigh (GAA Commentator), Joe Higgins (Socialist Party TD)
