= 2006 All-Ireland Senior Football Championship =

Football championship

Championship details
- Dates: 7 May – 17 September 2006
- Teams: 33

All-Ireland Champions
- Winning team: Kerry (34th win)
- Captain: Declan O'Sullivan
- Manager: Jack O'Connor

All-Ireland Finalists
- Losing team: Mayo
- Captain: David Heaney
- Manager: Mickey Moran

Provincial Champions
- Munster: Cork
- Leinster: Dublin
- Ulster: Armagh
- Connacht: Mayo

Championship statistics
- No. matches played: 65
- Goals total: 102 (1.48 per game)
- Points total: 1486 (21.54 per game)
- Top Scorer: Conor Mortimer (1–35)
- Player of the Year: Kieran Donaghy

The 2006 Bank of Ireland All-Ireland Senior Football Championship began on Sunday 7 May 2006. The 2006 championship used the same "Qualifier" system that was used in 2005. Tyrone were the defending champions, but were knocked out relatively early in the competition by Laois. Kerry won their 34th Sam Maguire beating Mayo in a repeat of the 2004 final.

== Format ==
Since the introduction of the so-called "back-door" system a few years ago, a number of changes have taken place in the championship format. In 2006 the following system was used:

The provincial championships in Munster, Leinster, Ulster and Connacht ran as usual on a "knock-out" basis. These provincial games were then followed by the "Qualifier" system:

- Round 1 of the qualifiers included all the counties (except New York) that did not qualify for the Provincial Semi-finals. An open draw was held to give eight pairings.
- Round 2 consisted of the eight defeated teams in the Provincial Semi-finals playing against the eight winners from Round 1. A draw was held to determine the eight pairings.
- Round 3 consisted of the eight winners from Round 2. Another open draw was held to determine the four pairings.
- Round 4 consisted of each of the four teams defeated in the Provincial Finals playing against the four winners from Round 3. A draw was held to determine the four pairings.

The All-Ireland Quarter-finals: Each of the four Provincial Champions played one of the four winners from Round 4. The All-Ireland Semi-finals were on a Provincial rots basis, initially determined by the Central Council. If a Provincial Championship winning team was defeated in its Quarter-final, the team that defeats it would take its place in the Semi-final.

== Results ==
=== Munster Senior Football Championship ===
Quarter-finals
Clare	0–08
Limerick	2–05
Waterford	0–08
Kerry	0–16

Semi-finals
Limerick	0–05
Cork	0–09
Tipperary	1–05
Kerry	0–17

Final
Cork	1–12
Kerry	0–09

==== Quarter-finals ====
21 May 2006
Quarter-final

Kerry	0–16 – 0–08	Waterford
B Sheehan 0–6, Declan O'Sullivan 0–4, P Galvin, C Cooper 0–2 each, E Fitzmaurice, P O'Connor 0–1 each	Report	S Cunningham 0–3, M Aherne, G Power, G Hurney, J Ryan, W Hennessy 0–1 each

Fitzgerald Stadium, Killarney
Referee: P. McGovern (Galway)

21 May 2006
Quarter-final

Limerick	2–05 – 0–08	Clare
J Galvin, M Crowley 1–0 each, S Buckley, J Murphy 0–2 each, J Cooke 0–1	Report	David Russell, Denis Russell 0–2 each, M O'Dwyer, D Heddington, N Considine, G Quinlan 0–1 each

Gaelic Grounds, Limerick
Referee: T. Quigley (Dublin)

==== Semi-finals ====
11 June 2006
Semi-final

Kerry	0–17 – 1–05	Tipperary
B Sheehan 0–7, K Donaghy 0–2, A O'Mahony, T O'Se, S Moynihan, Declan O'Sullivan, P Galvin, C Cooper, MF Russell, E Fitzmaurice 0–1 each	Report	D Browne 0–5, R Costigan 1–0

Fitzgerald Stadium, Killarney
Referee: M. Daly (Mayo)

11 June 2006
Semi-final

Limerick	0–05 – 0–09	Cork
O Keating, M Reidy 0–2 each, M Crowley 0–1	Report	J Masters 0–8, K O'Sullivan 0–1

Gaelic Grounds, Limerick
Referee: S. Doyle (Wexford)

==== Final ====
9 July 2006
Final

Kerry	0–10 – 0–10	Cork
J Masters 0–7 (0–6 frees); K McMahon, F Gould and K O’Connor 0–1 each.	Report	B Sheehan 0–6 (0–3 frees, 0–1 ‘45); C Cooper (free), Declan O’Sullivan, Darren O’Sullivan and P Galvin 0–1 each.

Fitzgerald Stadium, Killarney
Attendance: 26,220
Referee: J. McQuillan (Cavan)

16 July 2006
Final Replay

Kerry	0–09 – 1–12	Cork
D O Se, B Sheehan 0–2 each, P Galvin, C Cooper, Darren O'Sullivan, S O'Sullivan, MF Russell 0–1 each	Report	J Masters 1–6, D O'Connor 0–2, S O'Brien, J Hayes, F Goold, K O'Sullivan 0–1 each

Páirc Uí Chaoimh, Cork
Attendance: 23,693
Referee: S. Doyle (Wexford)

=== Leinster Senior Football Championship ===
1st round
Offaly	0–15
Westmeath	0–11
Louth	0–10
Meath	1–15
Carlow	4–09
Wicklow	0–12

Quarter-finals
Offaly	3–09
Kildare	0–15
Meath	1–13
Wexford	1–19
Carlow	1–09
Laois	1–17
Dublin	1–12
Longford	0–13

Semi-finals
Offaly	2–15
Wexford	1–14
Laois	0–12
Dublin	3–17

Final
Offaly	0–09
Dublin	1–15

==== Round 1 ====
14 May 2006
1st round

Westmeath	0–11 – 0–15	Offaly
PJ Ward 0–4, G Dolan, A Mangan 0–2 each, D Duffy, G Duffy, D Glennon 0–1 each	Report	C McManus, N McNamee 0–4 each, C Quinn, T Deehan 0–3 each, K Slattery 0–1,

Croke Park, Dublin
Attendance: 37426
Referee: Paddy Russell (Tipperary)

14 May 2006
1st round

Meath	1–15 – 0–10	Louth
	Report

Croke Park, Dublin

21 May 2006
1st round

Wicklow	0–12 – 4–09	Carlow
T Gill, J Daniels 0–3 each, P Cronin 0–2, J Stafford, L Glynn, W O'Gorman 0–1 each	Report	S Rea 1–2, B Carbery 1–1, T Walsh, A Kelly 1–0 each, P Hickey 0–3, M Carpenter 0–2, P Walsh 0–1

Wexford Park, Wexford
Referee: M. Collins (Cork)

==== Quarter-finals ====
28 May 2006
Quarter-final

Kildare	0–15 – 3–09	Offaly
J Doyle 0–6, T Fennin, P O'Neill, J Kavanagh 0–2 each, D Earley, K Brennan, K Ennis 0–1 each	Report	N McNamee 1–1, A McNamee, T Deehan 1–0 each, K Slattery 0–2, S Brady, C McManus, C Quinn, N Coughlan, J Reynolds, J Coughlan 0–1 each

Croke Park, Dublin
Attendance: 32237
Referee: M. Hughes (Tyrone)

28 May 2006
Quarter-final

Wexford	1–19 – 1–13	Meath
M Forde 0–12, C Deeley 0–3, P Colfer 1–0, P Curtis, D Kinsella, L Murphy, J Hudson 0–1 each	Report	D Regan 0–5, A Moyles 1–0, J Sheridan, G Geraghty 0–2 each, N McKeigue, C King, P Byrne, B Farrell 0–1 each

Croke Park, Dublin
Referee: V. Neary (Mayo)

4 June 2006
Quarter-final

Longford	0–13 – 1–12	Dublin
	Report

Pearse Park, Longford
Referee: J. McQuillan (Cavan)

4 June 2006
Quarter-final

Laois	1–17 – 1–09	Carlow
R Munnelly, B McDonald 0–4 each, F Byron 1–0, D Brennan 0–3, P Lawlor, G Kavanagh 0–2 each, I Fitzgerald, C Conway 0–1 each	Report	S Rea 1–4, J Hayden, J Byrne, B Carbery, M Carpenter, P Hickey 0–1 each

O'Moore Park, Portlaoise
Referee: J. Geaney (Cork)

==== Semi-finals ====
25 June 2006
Semi-final

Dublin	3–17 – 0–12	Laois
T Quinn 2–3, C Keaney 0–6, R Cosgrove 1–3, A Brogan 0–2, P Casey 0–1	Report	B McDonald 0–4, R Munnelly 0–3, C Conway 0–2, D Brennan, B McCormack 0–1 each

Croke Park, Dublin
Referee: B. Crowe (Cavan)

2 July 2006
Semi-final

Offaly	2–15 – 1–14	Wexford
N McNamee 1–7, T Deehan 1–4, C McManus, J Reynolds 0–1 each	Report	M Forde 1–7, D Kinsella 0–2, R Barry, R Stafford, P Colfer, D Fogarty, PJ Banville 0–1 each

Croke Park, Dublin
Attendance: 44081
Referee: J. White (Donegal)

==== Final ====
16 July 2006
Final

Dublin	1–15 – 0–09	Offaly
T Quinn 0–7, J Sherlock 1–1, A Brogan 0–4, C Keaney 0–3	Report	N McNamee 0–4, C McManus, T Deehan 0–2 each, A McNamee 0–1

Croke Park, Dublin
Attendance: 81754
Referee: M. Duffy (Sligo)

=== Ulster Senior Football Championship ===
Preliminary round
Cavan	0–11
Down	1–13

Quarter-finals
Antrim	0–09
Fermanagh	1–09
Monaghan	0–10
Armagh	1–13
Down	1–11
Donegal	1–12
Tyrone	0–05
Derry	1–08

Semi-finals
Fermanagh	1–08
Armagh	0–16
Donegal	1–11
Derry	0–11

Final
Armagh	1–09
Donegal	0–09

==== Round 1 ====
7 May 2006
Preliminary round

Down	1–13 – 0–11	Cavan
M Walsh 0–5, B Coulter 1–0, D Hughes 0–3, D Gordon, E McCartan, A Rogers, R Murtagh, R Sexton 0–1 each	Report	S Johnston 0–6, L Reilly 0–2, G Pierson, D McCabe, P Brady 0–1 each

Casement Park, Belfast
Referee: E. Murtagh (Longford)

==== Quarter-finals ====
14 May 2006
Quarter-final

Armagh	0–10 – 0–10	Monaghan
O McConville 0–5, S McDonnell 0–2, K McGeeney, M Mackin, R Clarke 0–1 each	Report	S Gollogly, P Finlay, R Woods 0–2 each, H McElroy, T Freeman, D Freeman, D Clerkin 0–1 each

St. Tiernach's Park, Clones
Referee: P. Fox (Westmeath)

20 May 2006
Quarter-final Replay

Armagh	1–13 – 0–10	Monaghan
O McConville 0–5, B Mallon 1–1, S McDonnell 0–3, R Clarke 0–2, P Duffy, P McKeever 0–1 each	Report	P Finlay 0–4, R Woods 0–3, T Freeman 0–2, D Clerkin 0–1

St. Tiernach's Park, Clones
Referee: D. Fahy (Longford)

21 May 2006
Quarter-final

Fermanagh	1–09 – 0–09	Antrim
C O'Reilly 1–4, M Little 0–3, S Goan, S McDermott 0–1 each	Report	M Magill 0–4, P Cunningham 0–2, M McCann, K Niblock, K McGourty 0–1 each

Brewster Park, Enniskillen
Referee: M. Duffy (Sligo)

28 May 2006
Quarter-final

Tyrone	0–05 – 1–08	Derry
O Mulligan 0–2, D Harte, J McMahon, P Donnelly 0–1 each	Report	E Muldoon 1–3, P Bradley 0–3, J O'Kane, E Bradley 0–1 each

Healy Park, Omagh
Referee: D. Coldrick (Meath)

4 June 2006
Quarter-final

Donegal	1–12 – 1–11	Down
	Report

MacCumhaill Park, Ballybofey
Referee: G. O'Conamha (Galway)

==== Semi-finals ====
11 June 2006
Semi-final

Armagh	0–11 – 2–05	Fermanagh
S McDonnell, O McConville 0–3 each, R Clarke 0–2, A Kernan, C McKeever, P McKeever 0–1 each	Report	T Brewster 1–2, R Keenan 1–0, C O'Reilly 0–2, M Murphy 0–1

St. Tiernach's Park, Clones
Referee: J. Bannon (Longford)

25 June 2006
Semi-final Replay

Armagh	0–16 – 1–08	Fermanagh
O McConville 0–4, P McKeever, R Clarke 0–3 each, S McDonnell 0–2, A Kernan, C McKeever, M Mackin 0–1 each	Report	C O'Reilly 1–1, M Little 0–3, T Brewster 0–2, E Maguire, J Sherry 0–1 each

St. Tiernach's Park, Clones
Referee: P. Russell (Tipperary)

18 June 2006
Semi-final

Donegal	1–13 – 0–11	Derry
M Doherty 1–4, R Kavanagh 0–5, K Lacey, C Bonner 0–2 each	Report	E Muldoon, P Bradley 0–4 each, J Diver 0–2, F McEldowney 0–1

St. Tiernach's Park, Clones
Referee: M. Monahan (Kildare)

==== Final ====
9 July 2006
Final

Armagh	1–09 – 0–09	Donegal
P McGrane 1–0, R Clarke 0–3, J McEntee, O McConville 0–2 each, S McDonnell, A Mallon 0–1 each	Report	A Sweeney 0–3, E McGee, B Dunnion, M Hegarty, R Kavanagh, C Dunne, C Kelly 0–1 each

Croke Park, Dublin
Referee: M. Monahan (Kildare)

=== Connacht Senior Football Championship ===
Quarter-finals
New York	0–09
Roscommon	1–14
Sligo	1–12
Galway	0–19
London	0–08
Mayo	1–18

Semi-finals
Roscommon	1–08
Galway	3–07
Leitrim	1–09
Mayo	1–10

Final
Galway	1–08
Mayo	0–12

==== Quarter-finals ====
14 May 2006
Quarter-final

New York	0–09 – 1–14	Roscommon
	Report

Gaelic Park, New York City

21 May 2006
Quarter-final

Galway	postponed	Sligo

Pearse Stadium, Galway

27 May 2006
Quarter-final

Galway	0–19 – 1–12	Sligo
	Report

Pearse Stadium, Galway
Attendance: 7,153
Referee: P. McEnaney (Monaghan)

28 May 2006
Quarter-final

London	0–08 – 1–18	Mayo
	Report

Emerald GAA Grounds, Ruislip

==== Semi-finals ====
18 June 2006
Semi-final

Roscommon	1–08 – 3–07	Galway
G Heneghan 0–4, E Kenny 1–0, K Mannion 0–3, G Lohan 0–1	Report	M Meehan 1–3, S Armstrong 1–1, Derek Savage 1–0, P Joyce 0–2, N Coleman 0–1

Dr. Hyde Park, Roscommon
Attendance: 11,317
Referee: M. Deegan (Laois)

25 June 2006
Semi-final

Leitrim	1–09 – 1–10	Mayo
C Carroll 1–0, M Foley 0–3, D McHugh, S Foley, C Regan, D Duignan, D Brennan, C Duignan 0–1 each	Report	C Mortimer 0–4, G Brady 1–0, K McDonald 0–3, A Moran, P Harte, A Kilcoyne 0–1 each

Páirc Seán Mac Diarmada, Carrick-on-Shannon
Referee: T. Quigley (Dublin)

==== Final ====
16 July 2006
Final

Mayo	0–12 – 1–08	Galway
C Mortimer 0–4, C McDonald, A Dillon 0–2 each, P Harte, BJ Padden, G Brady 0–1 each	Report	M Clancy 1–0, P Joyce 0–3, M Meehan 0–2, S Armstrong, C Bane, J Bergin 0–1 each

McHale Park, Castlebar
Attendance: 34,613
Referee: P. Russell (Tipperary)

=== All-Ireland qualifiers ===
==== Round 1 ====
This Round included all the counties that did not qualify for their respective Provincial Semi-finals. An Open Draw was held to give eight pairings, the winners progressed to Round 2 and the losers were eliminated from the 2006 All-Ireland Football Championship, but could continue in the All-Ireland competition, the Tommy Murphy Cup. Due to a controversial blood substitution by Offaly against Kildare, Kildare decided to appeal the match result and therefore Offaly's continuation in the Leinster Championship. Eventually it was clarified that Offaly hadn't broken the substitution rules, Kildare then faced Cavan in the first round of the qualifiers and subsequently defeated them. Round one saw the exit of Antrim, Down, Waterford, London, Carlow, Louth, Cavan and Wicklow from the 2006 All-Ireland Senior Football Championship. All-Ireland Football Champions Tyrone were forced to a replay against Louth but Tyrone came out as winners in the end.

17 June 2006 Round 1	Tyrone	2–16 – 2–16	Louth	Páirc Tailteann, Navan
	O Mulligan 2–6, S O'Neill 0–4, E McGinley, R Mulgrew 0–2 each, P Jordan, G Cavlan 0–1 each	Report	D Clarke 0–7, M Stanfield 1–2, JP Rooney 1–0, B White 0–2, J Carr 0–1, M Farrelly 0–1, P Keenan 0–1, M Brennan 0–1, R Finnegan 0–1	Referee: F. Flynn (Leitrim)

17 June 2006 Round 1	Monaghan	2–19 – 3–06	Wicklow	St. Tiernach's Park, Clones
	T Freeman 1–8, R Woods 1–2, D Clerkin, E Duffy, P Finlay 0–2 each, S Gollogly 0–1	Report	L Glynn 1–2, J Daniels 0–4 G Doyle 1–0, A Halpin 1–0	Referee: M. Duffy (Sligo)

18 June 2006 Round 1	Westmeath	0–20 – 0–08	London	Cusack Park, Mullingar
	B Solan 0–4, N Clinton 0–3, P McDermott 0–1	Report	D Glennon 0–10, D Healy, G Dolan, A Mangan 0–2 each, M Ennis, D Duffy, J Fallon, J Nugent 0–1 each	Referee: M. Higgins (Fermanagh)

17 June 2006 Round 1	Antrim	2–09 – 1–13	Clare	Casement Park, Belfast
	K Niblock, M Magill 1–1, C Close, P Cunningham, M McCann 0–2, M Dougan 0–1	Report	Denis Russell 0–6, S Hickey 1–1, G Quinlan, P O'Dwyer 0–2 each, N Considine, M O'Dwyer 0–1 each

17 June 2006 Round 1	Sligo	1–07 – 0–04	Down	Markievicz Park, Sligo
	D Hughes 0–2, L Doyle, A Carr 0–1 each	Report	S Davey 1–1, M Breheny 0–3, R Donovan, P Taylor, J McPartland 0–1 each	Referee: D. Coldrick (Meath)

17 June 2006 Round 1	Waterford	1–09 – 1–16	Longford	Walsh Park, Waterford
		Report

18 June 2006 Round 1	Carlow	0–12 – 1–17	Meath	Dr. Cullen Park, Carlow
	G Geraghty 1–1, J Sheridan 0–4, C McCarthy 0–3, D Regan, M Doran 0–2 each, C King, N Crawford, P Curran, B Farrell, R Magee 0–1 each	Report	P Walsh 0–1, T Walsh 0–1, P Hickey 0–2, S Rea 0–6, T Smith 0–1, D Byrne 0–1	Referee: A. Mangan (Kerry)

24 June 2006 Round 1 replay	Tyrone	1–12 – 1–07	Louth	Healy Park, Omagh
	C McCullagh 0–5, E McGinley 1–0, M Penrose 0–2, O Mulligan 0–2, R Mellon 0–2, S Cavanagh 0–1	Report	P Keenan 1–0, M Stanfield, D Clarke, A Hoey 0–2 each, M Brennan 0–1	Referee: G. O'Conamha (Galway)

24 June 2006 Round 1	Kildare	1–18 – 1–13	Cavan	St. Conleth's Park, Newbridge
	J Doyle 0–6, R Sweeney 1–0, D Earley 0–3, M Foley, T Archbold, P O'Neill 0–2 each, T Connor, T Fennin, K Brennan 0–1 each	Report	S Johnston 0–6, L Reilly 1–0, J Reilly 0–2, R Flanagan, E O'Reilly, M Cahill, A Forde, S Brady 0–1 each	Referee: M. Meade (Limerick)

==== Round 2 ====
The eight winners of the first round qualifiers were paired with the eight losers in the All-Ireland Provincial Semi-finals. Round 2 saw the exit of Kildare, Roscommon, Limerick, Tipperary, Clare, Monaghan, Leitrim and 2005 All-Ireland Champions Tyrone.

8 July 2006 Round 2	Monaghan	0–06 – 0–08	Wexford	St. Tiernach's Park, Clones
		Report		Referee: F. Flynn (Leitrim)

9 July 2006 Round 2	Leitrim	0–09 – 1–07	Sligo	Páirc Seán Mac Diarmada, Carrick-on-Shannon
		Report		Referee: C. Broderick (Down)

1 July 2006 Round 2	Meath	1–19 – 0–09	Roscommon	Páirc Tailteann, Navan
	D Regan, J Sheridan 0–5 each, C King 1–0, P Curran 0–3, B Lynch 0–2, B Farrell, D White, S Kenny, M Ward 0–1 each	Report	S O'Neill, C Cregg, G Heneghan 0–3 each	Referee: P. McEnaney (Monaghan)

8 July 2006 Round 2	Clare	0–10 – 0–15	Fermanagh	Cusack Park, Ennis
	Denis Russell 0–6, M O'Shea 0–2, G Quinlan, S Hickey 0–1 each	Report	T Brewster 0–7, E Maguire, C O Reilly, M McGrath 0–2 each, A Little, F Doherty 0–1 each	Referee: C. Reilly (Meath)

2 July 2006 Round 2	Westmeath	0–13 – 1–09	Limerick	Cusack Park, Mullingar
	D Dolan 0–5, A Mangan 0–3, M Ennis 0–2, J Connellan, D O'Donoghue, J Fallon 0–1 each	Report	M Gavin 0–6, M Reidy 1–1, D Horan, S Buckley 0–1 each	Referee: P. McGovern (Galway)

1 July 2006 Round 2	Longford	1–23 – 1–10	Tipperary	Pearse Park, Longford
	B Kavanagh 0–8, P Barden 0–6, D Barden 1–3, K Smith, P Foy, W Murray, B McElvaney, L Keenan, P Berry 0–1 each	Report	D Browne 0–4, B Hickey 0–3, B Mulvihill 1–0, D O'Brien 0–2, B Lacey 0–1	Referee: P. Hughes (Armagh)

8 July 2006 Round 2	Laois	0–09 – 0–06	Tyrone	O'Moore Park, Portlaoise
		Report		Referee: J. Geaney (Cork)

1 July 2006 Round 2	Derry	1–17 – 0–11	Kildare	Celtic Park, Derry
	P O'Neill 0–5, J Doyle 0–3, J Kavanagh 0–2, T Fennin 0–1	Report	P Bradley 0–6, J McBride 1–0, J Kelly 0–3, C Mullan 0–2, G Donaghy, M Lynch, J Diver, F Doherty, E Bradley, R Convery 0–1 each	Referee: M. Daly (Mayo)

==== Round 3 ====
Round three consisted of the eight winners from Round two. Another open draw was held with the eight winners to determine the four pairings. The teams taking part in the third round were: Laois, Wexford, Meath, Fermanagh, Sligo, Westmeath, Longford and Derry.

15 July 2006 Round 3	Meath	0–13 – 2–13	Laois	Páirc Tailteann, Navan
	R Munnelly 2–4, C Conway 0–6, B McCormack 0–2, B McDonald 0–1	Report	P Curran 0–4, M Ward, M Doran, G Geraghty 0–2 each, B Lynch, D Regan, S MacGabhann 0–1 each	Referee: P. McEnaney (Monaghan)

15 July 2006 Round 3	Fermanagh	2–12 – 0–11	Wexford	Brewster Park, Enniskillen
	T Brewster 0–6, C O'Reilly 1–3, E Maguire 1–0, M McGrath, A Little, J Sherry 0–1 each	Report	E Bradley 0–3, S Cullen 0–3, D Kinsella 0–2, C Deeley, P Colfer, L Murphy 0–1 each	Referee: B. Tyrell (Tipperary)

15 July 2006 Round 3	Longford	1–16 – 2–12	Derry	Pearse Park, Longford
		Report		Referee: M. Collins (Cork)

15 July 2006 Round 3	Sligo	0–14 – 1–12 (a.e.t.)	Westmeath	Markievicz Park, Sligo
	M Breheny 0–5, S Davey 0–4, J McPartland 0–2, T Taylor, K Sweeney, P Taylor 0–1 each	Report	D Dolan 0–8, G Dolan 1–0, D Duffy, D Healy, D Heavin, J Connellan 0–1 each	Referee: M. Ryan (Limerick)

==== Round 4 ====
Round 4 consisted of each of the four teams defeated in the Provincial Finals playing against the four winners from Round 3. Donegal were paired with their Ulster rivals Fermanagh, and Leinster finalists Offaly were paired with local rivals Laois. Kerry met surprise fourth round qualifiers Longford and Galway met Westmeath.

30 July 2006 Round 4	Fermanagh	0–08 – 0–11	Donegal	Brewster Park, Enniskillen
	T Brewster, E Maguire 0–2 each, M McGrath, M Murphy, S Doherty, C O'Reilly 0–1 each	Report	C Toye, L Thompson, J Gallagher 0–2 each, M Hegarty, R Kavanagh, A Sweeney, C Kelly, S McHugh 0–1 each	Referee: E. Murtagh (Longford)

29 July 2006 Round 4	Galway	0–10 – 1–08	Westmeath	Pearse Stadium, Galway
	G Dolan 1–1, D Dolan 0–3, D Glennon 0–2, A Mangan, G Glennon 0–1 each	Report	M Meehan 0–4, C Bane 0–2, D Meehan, P Joyce, J Bergin, M Donnellan 0–1 each	Referee: A. Mangan (Kerry)

29 July 2006 Round 4	Kerry	4–11 – 1–11	Longford	Fitzgerald Stadium, Killarney
	B Kavanagh 1–6, P Barden 0–3, B McElvaney 0–2	Report	, E Brosnan 3–0, C Cooper 1–3, MF Russell 0–2, K Donaghy, P Galvin, D Ó Sé, B Sheehan, S O'Sullivan, T Griffin 0–1 each	Referee: V. Neary (Mayo)

30 July 2006 Round 4	Laois	1–09 – 0–04	Offaly	O'Moore Park, Portlaoise
	C Conway, R Munnelly 0–3 each, P Clancy 1–0, B Quigley 0–2, F Byron 0–1	Report	C McManus 0–3, C Quinn 0–1	Attendance: 16800; Referee: J. McQuillan (Cavan)

=== All-Ireland series ===
Quarterfinals
Armagh	1–13
Kerry	3–15
Cork	1–11
Donegal	1–10
Dublin	1–12
Westmeath	0–5
Mayo	0–14
Laois	0–11

Semifinals
Kerry	0–16
Cork	0–10
Dublin	2–12
Mayo	1–16

Final
Kerry	4–15
Mayo	3–05

==== Quarter-finals ====
5 August 2006
Quarter-final

Armagh	1–13 – 3–15	Kerry
S McDonnell 1–5, R Clarke, O McConville 0–3 each, A Kernan, J McEntee 0–1 each	Report	E Brosnan, K Donaghy, Darren O'Sullivan 1–0 each, C Cooper 0–3, MF Russell, M Ó Sé, B Sheehan, S O'Sullivan 0–2 each, Declan O'Sullivan, T Ó Sé, P Galvin 0–1 each

Croke Park, Dublin
Referee: D. Coldrick (Meath)

5 August 2006
Quarter-final

Cork	1–11 – 1–10	Donegal
J Hayes 1–1, J Masters 0–3, G Spillane 0–2, P O'Neill, S O'Brien, F Gould, K McMahon, D O'Connor 0–1 each	Report	C Toye 1–0, M Doherty 0–3, L Thompson 0–2, B Monaghan, B Dunnion, C Bonner, R Kavanagh, C Kelly 0–1 each

Croke Park, Dublin
Referee: T. Quigley (Dublin)

12 August 2006
Quarter-final

Dublin	1–12 – 0–05	Westmeath
T Quinn 1–2, A Brogan 0–4, C Keaney 0–2, S Ryan, R Cosgrove, J Sherlock 0–1 each	Report	M Ennis, J Connellan, D Glennon, D Dolan, J Smyth 0–1 each

Croke Park, Dublin
Referee: B. Crowe (Cavan)

13 August 2006
Quarter-final

Mayo	0–15 – 0–15	Laois
C Mortimer 0–6, A Kilcoyne, A Dillon 0–2 each, D Heaney, BJ Padden, C McDonald, K O'Neill, A Moran 0–1 each	Report	C Conway 0–6, N Garvan, D Brennan 0–3 each, R Munnelly 0–2, B McDonald 0–1

Croke Park, Dublin
Referee: P. McEnaney (Monaghan)

20 August 2006
Quarter-final Replay

Mayo	0–14 – 0–11	Laois
C Mortimer 0–5, A Higgins, A Dillon 0–2 each, A Kilcoyne, R McGarrity, BJ Padden, G Brady, C McDonald 0–1 each	Report	R Munnelly 0–5, C Conway, B McDonald 0–2 each, P Clancy, D Brennan 0–1 each

Croke Park, Dublin
Referee: J. McQuillan (Cavan)

==== Semi-finals ====
20 August 2006
Semi-final

Kerry	0–16 – 0–10	Cork
MF Russell 0–6, C Cooper 0–4, S O'Sullivan 0–2, K Donaghy, T Ó Sé, P Galvin, Declan O'Sullivan 0–1 each	Report	J Masters 0–5, D O'Connor 0–2, K O'Sullivan, S O'Brien, C McCarthy 0–1 each

Croke Park, Dublin
Attendance: 58,703
Referee: J. Bannon (Longford)

27 August 2006
Semi-final

Mayo	1–16 – 2–12	Dublin
C Mortimer 0–5, A Dillon 0–4, A Moran 1–0, G Brady, C McDonald, K O'Neill 0–2 each, A Higgins 0–1	Report	C Keaney 1–3, A Brogan 0–4, J Sherlock 1–0, R Cosgrove, T Quinn 0–2 each, K Bonner 0–1

Croke Park, Dublin
Attendance: 82,148

==== Final ====
17 September 2006
15:30 (IST)
Final

Kerry	4–15 – 3–05	Mayo
C Cooper, K Donaghy, D O'Sullivan 1–2 each, E Brosnan 1–1, M F Russell, A O'Mahony 0–2 each, S Moynihan, P Galvin, S O'Sullivan 0–1 each,	Report	K O'Neill 2–0, P Harte 1–0, C Mortimer 0–3, B J Padden, C McDonald 0–1 each

Croke Park, Dublin
Attendance: 82,289
Referee: B. Crowe (Cavan)

== All-Ireland Football Final ==
Kerry; Green and Yellow Shirts/White shorts/Green Socks	4-15 - 3-5 (final score after 70 minutes)	Mayo; Green and Red shirts/White shorts/Red socks
Manager: Jack O'Connor Team: Diarmuid Murphy (GK); Marc Ó Sé; Michael McCarthy; Tom O'Sullivan; Tomás Ó Sé; Séamus Moynihan (0–1); Aidan O'Mahony (0–2); Darragh Ó Sé; Tommy Griffin; Seán O'Sullivan (0-01); Declan O'Sullivan (1-02) (Capt.); Paul Galvin (0–1); Colm Cooper (1-02); Kieran Donaghy (1-02); Mike Frank Russell (0-02) Substitutes: Eoin Brosnan (1-01); Darran O'Sullivan; Bryan Sheehan (0–1); Éamonn Fitzmaurice; B Guiney	Half-time: 3-08 - 3-02 Competition: All-Ireland Senior Football Championship (Final) Date: 15.30 BST; Sunday, September 17, 2006 Venue: Croke Park, Dublin Attendance: 82,289 Referee: Brian Crowe (Cavan) Match rules: 70 minutes. replay if scores still level. Maximum of 5 substitutions.	Manager: Mickey Moran Team: David Clarke (GK); Dermot Geraghty; David Heaney; Keith Higgins; Aidan Higgins; James Nallen; Peadar Gardiner; Ronan McGarrity; Pat Harte (1-00); Billy Joe Padden (0-01); Ger Brady; Alan Dillon; Kevin O'Neill (2-00); Conor Mortimer (0-03); Ciarán McDonald (0-01) Substitutes: D. Brady; Trevor Mortimer; Barry Moran; A Kilcoyne; Andy Moran

== Championship statistics ==
=== Miscellaneous ===
- Galway vs Sligo delayed by 6 days due to bad weather.
- It took an extra 5 years for a Mayo vs London in the Connacht championship after being cancelled due to foot and mouth disease in 2001.
- Wexford had their first championship win over Meath since 1981.
- Armagh become the first county to win a triple of Ulster titles since Down (1959–1961).
- The Ulster final was played at Croke Park, Dublin for the last time until 2021.
- Dublin vs Offaly Leinster final for the first time since 1983.
- In the old system there would have been a Cork vs Armagh All Ireland semi-final.

=== Top scorers ===
Player	County	Scores	Total
Conor Mortimer	Mayo	1–35	38
James Masters	Cork	1–30	33
Mattie Forde	Wexford	1–25	28
Ross Munnelly	Laois	2–22	28
Brian Kavanagh	Longford	1–24	27
Paddy Bradley	Derry	2–20	26
Bryan Sheehan	Kerry	0–26	26
Conal Keaney	Dublin	1–22	25
Tomás Quinn	Dublin	3–14	23
Michael Meehan	Galway	1–20	23
