= Páidí Ó Sé =

Kerry Gaelic footballer and manager (1955–2012)

Personal information
- Native name: Páidí Ó Sé (Irish)
- Nickname: Pio
- Born: 16 May 1955 Ceann Trá, County Kerry, Ireland
- Died: 15 December 2012 (aged 57) Ceann Trá, County Kerry, Ireland
- Occupations: Garda and publican
- Height: 5 ft 9 in (175 cm)

Sport
- Sport: Gaelic football
Clubs
- Years: Club
- 1970–1988: An Ghaeltacht; West Kerry
Club titles
- Kerry titles: 2 (Senior) w/ West Kerry; 1 (Junior) w/ An Ghaeltacht
Inter-county
Years	County	Apps (scores)
1974–1988	Kerry	53 (0–8)
Inter-county titles
- Munster titles: 11
- All-Irelands: 8
- NFL: 4
- All Stars: 5

Páidí Ó Sé (Irish pronunciation: [ˈpˠaːdʲiː oː ˈʃeː]; 16 May 1955 – 15 December 2012) was an Irish Gaelic football manager and player, whose league and championship career at senior level with the Kerry county team spanned fifteen seasons from 1974 to 1988. Ó Sé is widely regarded as one of the greatest defenders of his generation.

Born in Ceann Trá, County Kerry, Ó Sé was named after the Kerry Gaelic footballer of the time; Paudie Sheehy. He was encouraged as a Gaelic footballer by his mother, who recognised his "raw talent" and nurtured it. As a boarder at St Brendan's College Ó Sé excelled in the sport at colleges level and won back-to-back Corn Uí Mhuirí medals, however, an All-Ireland medal remained elusive.

At just fourteen-years of age Ó Sé joined the Gaeltacht senior team in 1970. He won numerous divisional championship titles in the course of his career, while he was also selected for the West Kerry divisional team. Ó Sé won back-to-back county senior championship medals in 1984 and 1985.

Ó Sé made his debut on the inter-county scene at the age of sixteen when he was selected for the Kerry minor team in 1971. He enjoyed three championship seasons with the minor team, however, he was a Munster runner-up all three occasions. Ó Sé subsequently joined the Kerry under-21 team, winning back-to-back All-Ireland medals in 1975 and 1976. By this stage he had also joined the Kerry senior team, making his debut during the 1973-74 league. Over the course of the next fifteen seasons, Ó Sé won eight All-Ireland medals, beginning with a lone triumph in 1975, a record-equalling four championships in-a-row from 1978 to 1981 and three championships in-a-row from 1984 to 1986. He also won eleven Munster medals, four National Football League medals and five successive All-Stars. Ó Sé played his last game for Kerry in May 1988 before being dropped from the starting fifteen for the subsequent Munster final defeat by Cork, a move which effectively brought an end to his inter-county career.

After being chosen on the Munster inter-provincial team for the first time in 1976, Ó Sé was an automatic choice on the starting fifteen until 1985. During that time he won four Railway Cup medals.

Even during his playing days Ó Sé became involved in team management and coaching. He was player-manager of the West Kerry team that secured championship honours in 1985, before guiding the team to a second championship title from the sideline in 1990. Ó Sé was overlooked for the position of Kerry senior football team manager in 1989 and again in 1992, however, he was appointed manager of the Kerry under-21 team in 1993. After winning the All-Ireland Championship in this grade in 1995, he was later appointed manager of the Kerry senior team. In his eight seasons in charge Ó Sé guided the team to two All-Ireland Championships, six Munster Championships and one National League. As manager he was instrumental in developing the inter-county careers of his three nephews, Darragh, Tomás and Marc Ó Sé, however, his tenure as manager ended acrimoniously after a heavy defeat by Tyrone which followed some controversial comments about the Kerry supporters. Ó Sé remained in inter-county management and was appointed manager of the westmeath senior team in 2003. His tenure was a successful one, with Westmeath securing a first ever Leinster Championship in 2004. Ó Sé ended his inter-county managerial career with a one-year stint as manager of the Clare senior team.

Ó Sé was renowned as a tough defender and tight marker, a trait best exemplified in the fact that he conceded just one solitary point in ten All-Ireland final appearances. He was regarded as a larger-than-life character both on and off the field and he remains an iconic figure in the annals of Gaelic football in Kerry. Ó Sé's sudden death in December 2012 led to a widespread outpouring of grief amongst the people of Kerry and a deep sense of loss throughout the wider Gaelic football community.

== Early life ==
Páidi Ó Sé was born in the heart of the Gaeltacht in Ceann Trá, County Kerry in 1955. He was the third of three boys, with two older brothers Mícheál and brother Tom. A native Irish speaker, he was educated locally at Cill Mhic a' Domhnaigh National School. He later attended Dingle CBS, St Brendan's College in Killarney (from which he was expelled), before completing his Leaving Certificate (which he failed) at St Michael's College in Listowel. While receiving his secondary school education, Ó Sé's interest in Gaelic football was nurtured. During his secondary schooling, he won four consecutive Kerry senior colleges' titles from 1971 until 1974. Ó Sé won back-to-back Corn Uí Mhuirí titles in 1972 and 1973 with St Brendan's, before adding a Munster 'B' colleges' title to his collection in 1974 with St Michael's. He subsequently trained to be a Garda Síochána and was based in Limerick for four years. He also played rugby for Young Munster for one year. He quit the guards to become a publican as it suited his football career.

== Playing career ==
=== Club ===
Ó Sé played his club football with an Ghaeltacht. He made his senior debut as a fourteen-year-old in 1969, before going on to win a West Kerry divisional medal in 1970. It was with divisional side West Kerry that Ó Sé enjoyed his greatest success. As player-manager of the team in 1984 he guided West Kerry to a County Championship final. South Kerry provided the opposition; however, a narrow 1-7 to 1-6 victory gave Ó Sé a Championship medal. A second Championship medal was added to Ó Sé's collection in 1985 as West Kerry retained their title following a defeat of Feale Rangers. Ó Sé finished off his club career with an Ghaeltacht, winning a West Kerry League medal in 1988.

=== Minor and under-21 ===
Ó Sé first played for Kerry as a member of the county's minor football team. He enjoyed little success in this grade, before later joining the Kerry under-21 football team.

After missing Kerry's Munster final triumph in 1973, Ó Sé was a key addition to the team for the subsequent All-Ireland final. Mayo provided the opposition on that occasion; however, Kerry recorded a 2-13 to 0-13 victory. The win gave Ó Sé an All-Ireland medal.

In 1975, Ó Sé captured a Munster medal following a nine-point trouncing of Waterford. Ó Sé's side later qualified for the All-Ireland final with Dublin providing the opposition. A 1-15 to 0-10 score line gave Kerry the victory and gave Ó Sé a second All-Ireland medal.

In 1976, Ó Sé added a second Munster medal to his collection as Kerry retained their provincial crown at the expense of Cork. He later lined out in a third All-Ireland final. Kildare provided the opposition on that occasion; however, they were no match for Kerry. Ó Sé collected a third All-Ireland medal following a 0-14 to 1-3 trouncing.

=== Senior ===
Ó Sé made his first senior appearance for Kerry in a National League game against Galway in 1974. It was a successful campaign as Kerry subsequently reached the final against Roscommon. A drawn game was followed by 0-14 to 0-8 victory for Kerry. It was Ó Sé's first National League medal. He later made his championship debut against Waterford.

In 1975, a new Kerry team was formed under manager Mick O'Dwyer. That year, Ó Sé won his first Munster medal when Kerry defeated Cork. Kerry then played reigning champions Dublin in the senior All-Ireland final. Although Dublin were favored, Kerry won by 2–12 to 0–11, earning Ó Sé his first senior All-Ireland medal. He later described winning this medal as the greatest thrill of his career, noting that the team was young and unfavored to win.

Ó Sé captured his second Munster medal in 1976 before later lining out in his second All-Ireland final. Once again it was Dublin who provided the opposition. Both sides were hoping for success; however, new player Kevin Moran was causing havoc with the Kerry defence. Jimmy Keaveney converted a penalty to help Dublin to a 3-8 to 0-10 victory and defeat for Ó Sé.

1977 proved to be another frustrating year. The year began with Ó Sé capturing a second National League medal and a third consecutive Munster medal following another win over Cork. Kerry later took on Dublin for the third consecutive year; however, this time it was in the All-Ireland semi-final. In one of the greatest games of football ever-played, the Dubs triumphed and Ó Sé was still left waiting for a second All-Ireland medal.

In 1978, Kerry once again faced little competition in the Provincial Championship. Kerry defeated Cork, on a scoreline of 3-14 to 3-7, giving Ó Sé a fourth Munster medal in-a-row. Kerry later qualified for a third All-Ireland final in four years. Old rivals Dublin provided the opposition; however, the game turned into a rout. The game is chiefly remembered for Mikey Sheehy's sensational goal. The Kerry forward lobbed the ball over the head of Paddy Cullen, who was caught off his line arguing with the referee. New full-forward Eoin Liston scored a hat-trick of goals. Pat Spillane played all over the field, including goalkeeper after Charlie Nelligan was sent off. At the full-time whistle Kerry were the winners by 5-11 to 0-9.

Kerry made it five-in-a-row in Munster in 1979 as Cork fell by ten points in the provincial final. Ó Sé later went in search of a third All-Ireland medal as he lined out in a fourth All-Ireland championship decider. Dublin provided the opposition for the fifth consecutive occasion. Kerry were handicapped throughout the game. Ger Power did not start the game, while John O'Keeffe got injured and Ó Sé was sent off during the encounter. Two goals by Mikey Sheehy and a third by John Egan helped the Kingdom to a 3-13 to 1-8 victory. It was Ó Sé's third All-Ireland medal.

Kerry's dominance continued in 1980. Another defeat of Cork in the provincial final gave Ó Sé a sixth successive Munster medal. Another All-Ireland final appearance beckoned, this time with Roscommon providing the opposition. The Connacht champions shocked Kerry and took a five-point lead inside the first twelve minutes. Mikey Sheehy popped up again to score the decisive goal, as Kerry went on to claim a 1-9 to 1-6 victory in a game that contained sixty-four frees. The victory gave Kerry a third All-Ireland title in succession, while Ó Sé added a fourth All-Ireland medal to his ever-growing collection.

In 1981, Ó Sé won his seventh consecutive Munster title, before lining out in the All-Ireland final against Offaly. Kerry had an easy win with seven players combining for a great goal. He captured his fifth All-Ireland medal that day as Kerry won by 1-12 to 0-8.

Ó Sé won his third National League medal in 1982 before Kerry secured an eighth consecutive Munster final victory over Cork. The All-Ireland final pitted the Kingdom against Offaly for the second year in-a-row. Kerry had the upper hand for much of the game and were leading by two points with two minutes left to be played. The game, however, was not over as Offaly substitute Séamus Darby, who had entered the game almost unnoticed, produced the most spectacular of finishes by scoring a late goal. Kerry failed to score again to level the match and Offaly went on to win their third All-Ireland title ever on a score line of 1-15 to 0-17.

Kerry missed out on an historic nine-in-a-row in Munster in 1983, as Cork finally triumphed after so many defeats. The Kingdom bounced back the following year with Ó Sé winning his fourth National League medal and his ninth Munster medal. The centenary-year All-Ireland final pitted Kerry against old rivals and reigning champions Dublin. Kerry dominated the game from start to finish. Only two Dublin forwards scored as Kerry ran out easy winners by 0-14 to 1-6. It was Ó Sé's sixth All-Ireland winners' medal.

In 1985, Ó Sé was appointed captain of the Kerry team. A two-goal victory over Cork gave Ó Sé a remarkable tenth Munster medal. Another All-Ireland final beckoned, with Dublin providing the opposition for a second consecutive year. Jack O'Shea scored a key goal after eleven minutes and Kerry stormed to a nine-point lead at half-time. The Dubs came storming back with Joe McNally scoring two goals. The gap could not be bridged and Kerry won by 2-12 to 2-8. The victory gave Ó Sé a record-equalling seventh All-Ireland medal, while he also had the honour of lifting the Sam Maguire Cup.

In 1986, Kerry's dominance showed no sign of disappearing. Cork fell again in the provincial final, giving Ó Sé an eleventh Munster medal. A tenth All-Ireland final appearance quickly followed and it turned out to be an historic occasion. Tyrone provided the opposition in their first-ever championship decider. A Peter Quinn goal gave the Ulster men a six-point lead in the second-half; however, the game was far from over. Pat Spillane ran fifty yards up the field for a hand-passed goal to get Kerry back on track. Mikey Sheehy scored a second goal to give the Kingdom a 2-15 to 1-10 victory. It was a record-breaking eighth All-Ireland medal for Ó Sé. He only conceded one point to his opponent in his ten All-Ireland final appearances.

The glory days were now over for Kerry as Cork captured the Munster title in 1987. Following Kerry's 1988 Championship exit, Mick O'Dwyer dropped Ó Sé from the inter-county team. They did not speak for three years.

=== Inter-provincial ===
O Sé also lined out with Munster in the inter-provincial series of games and enjoyed much success. He first played for his province in 1976 as Munster reached the decider. A 2-15 to 2-8 defeat of Leinster gave Ó Sé a Railway Cup medal. After an absence of a year, Ó Sé returned to the provincial team in 1978. Munster reached the decider once again; however, a 2-7 apiece draw with Ulster was the result on that occasion. Munster won the replay by 4-12 to 0-19 and Ó Sé collected a second Railway Cup medal. Ó Sé lined out with Munster until 1985, winning two more Railway Cup medals following back-to-back defeats of Connacht in 1981 and 1982.

== Managerial career ==
=== Kerry ===
In late 1995, Ó Sé returned to the limelight when he was appointed manager of the Kerry senior football team. The task ahead was enormous as Kerry had fallen down the pecking order in terms of championship aspirations. The county hadn't won an All-Ireland title since Ó Sé was a player almost a decade earlier in 1986. Kerry's last Munster title came in 1991; however, since then near rivals Cork had dominated the provincial series. In Ó Sé's first Munster campaign in 1996 Kerry reached the final. Cork, a team looking for an eighth title in ten years, provided the opposition, however, Ó Sé's touch worked the oracle as the Kingdom won by 0-14 to 0-11. It was a sign that Kerry were on the way back; however, a defeat by Mayo in the subsequent All-Ireland semi-final highlighted the fact that the team was lacking in some quarters.

In 1997, Ó Sé's Kerry announced their arrival when they captured the National League title at the start of the year. A second Munster title soon followed after a demolition of Clare in the provincial decider. Kerry subsequently qualified for the All-Ireland final, with Mayo providing the opposition. The game saw both sides share periods of dominance. Kerry's Maurice Fitzgerald scored nine of his team's points while Mayo scored 1-2 in a two-minute spell. The Connacht champions failed to score in the last twenty minutes as Kerry held on to win by 0-13 to 1-7. The win was all the more significant for Ó Sé as he became one of the few people who captained and managed his county to an All-Ireland title.

1998 saw Ó Sé's Kerry team make it three Munster titles in a row. But, his side were later defeated by Mick O'Dwyer's Kildare in the All-Ireland semi-final.

After losing their provincial title in 1999, Kerry were back in 2000, securing a fourth Munster title in five campaigns. Kerry later defeated Armagh, after a draw and a replay which featured extra-time, to set up an All-Ireland final meeting with Galway. That game saw Ó Sé's side take a seven-point lead; however, Galway fought back to force a 0-14 apiece draw and a replay. A disputed free gave Kerry the lead with seventeen minutes left and Ó Sé's side eventually held on to win by 0-17 to 1-10.

At this point it looked as if Ó Sé's side would dominate football for the foreseeable future. In 2001 he guided Kerry to another Munster title and it looked as if a second consecutive All-Ireland title was on the cards. The subsequent All-Ireland semi-final proved to be a reality check as Meath trounced the Kingdom by 2-14 to 0-5.

In 2002, Kerry were still the masters of provincial football and Ó Sé guided his county to a sixth Munster title. Kerry later reached a third All-Ireland final under Ó Sé, this time with Armagh providing the opposition. At half-time it looked as if Kerry were on course for the ultimate victory. The Ulstermen lost John McEntee to concussion while Oisín McConville missed a penalty just before the interval. With a four-point lead and playing into the wind Kerry were set. McConville, however, scored a decisive goal in the fifty-fifth minute which stunned Kerry. Ó Sé's side failed to score for the last seventeen minutes as Armagh went on to claim their first All-Ireland title with a 1-12 to 0-14 victory.

2003 saw Ó Sé's tenure as manager dogged by controversy. In January of that year he gave a controversial interview to the Irish Independent in which he described the Kerry supporters as "the roughest type of fucking animals you could ever deal with". Ó Sé was forced to issue an embarrassing apology; however, he still guided his team to a seventh Munster title in eight years. Kerry, however, were later trounced by eventual champions Tyrone in the All-Ireland semi-final. Ó Sé later described the result as a "disastrous defeat". He was fired as manager. Speaking from his second home in Marbella, Ó Sé said: "I have to put it on record that I was extremely disappointed in the manner it [his sacking] was done."

=== Westmeath ===
One week after being sacked as Kerry manager, Ó Sé was unveiled as the new senior manager of the Westmeath county football team. On Sunday, 10 March 2004, Westmeath took on Jack O'Connor's Kerry team in a fourth-round league match, with Kerry winning by a scoreline of 2-10 to 0-10 victory, as Ó Sé sat on the bench, later admitting in the documentary Marooned that it was "the hardest day of my life outside bereavements and things like that". Things improved a little and Ó Sé led the county to their first ever Leinster Championship title in his first season in charge. The 0-12 to 0-10 defeat of Laois in the provincial decider proved that Ó Sé was a manager of some considerable skill. However, Westmeath's dream season came to an abrupt halt with a defeat by Derry in the All-Ireland quarter-final.

Ó Sé's second season in charge was less successful. Westmeath were dumped out of the provincial championship on their first outing. A defeat of Tipperary in the subsequent All-Ireland qualifiers was followed by a loss to Clare. This defeat brought Ó Sé's tenure to an end, and he was replaced by his understudy Tomás Ó Flatharta.

=== Clare ===
In 2007, Ó Sé was linked with a possible return to Kerry as manager; however, instead he was appointed manager of the Clare senior footballers. Once again expectations were high that Ó Sé would work his magic in a non-traditional football county. His tenure got off to a bad start when Clare were defeated by Waterford in the opening round of the provincial campaign and dumped out of the Championship. Speculation was rife that Ó Sé had abandoned Clare after this defeat. However, he returned and Clare later participated in the Tommy Murphy Cup, though a defeat by Antrim in the semi-final brought Ó Sé's tenure as manager to a premature end. He never again managed at inter-county level.

== Personal life ==
Ó Sé married his wife Máire, a schoolteacher, in 1984 and together they had three children - Neasa, Siún and Pádraig Óg. Ó Sé has three nephews that have also played for Kerry; Darragh, Tomás and Marc Ó Sé. All three have been selected for All Stars Awards teams. Daughter Siún married Paul Geaney in December 2018.

== Business career ==
Ó Sé ran a famed pub in Ceann Trá, the opening of which was attended by Taoiseach Charles Haughey, who flew into Kerry on one of his helicopters. The wall of his famous pub is adorned with portraits of figures such as Bill Clinton, Tom Cruise, Martin Sheen, Bertie Ahern and Brian Cowen, as well as Dolly Parton, who, one night in 1990, while holidaying in Kerry, walked impromptu into the pub and sang along with the house band one her songs, "Coat of Many Colors".

== Politics ==
A friend of government ministers, chat show hosts and Hollywood actors, as well as a director of Fáilte Ireland, Ó Sé was a fervent supporter of the centrist Fianna Fáil political party which dominated Ireland's national political scene during his lifetime. He regarded Charles Haughey as a great Taoiseach, openly admired Bertie Ahern and, ahead of the EU/IMF/ECB troika intervention in the country's affairs, he defended Brian Cowen as a "magnificent leader" in whom he had the "fullest of faith". When asked in 2004, he said he would like Cowen to be the next Finance Minister and admitted an interest in property investments. He was a good friend of Bertie Ahern; when Ahern was Taoiseach, he once brought the entire cabinet to the launch, at Dublin's Burlington Hotel, of the Páidí Ó Sé Football Weekend. Ó Sé was often spoken of as a future national politician himself, though he never pursued a political career.

== Death ==
Ó Sé died suddenly at his home in Ceann Trá early on 15 December 2012. His death, at the age of 57, was unexpected and was thought to have been as a result of a heart attack. Having got up in the morning, he had gone to lie down again after experiencing what he thought was indigestion, and his wife Maire found his body soon after.

Many figures from sport and politics offered their condolences, including President of Ireland Michael D. Higgins. Tánaiste Eamon Gilmore described Ó Sé as "arguably the best defender to grace Croke Park [...] a one-off – truly unique". Arts, Heritage and the Gaeltacht minister and former teammate Jimmy Deenihan was "shocked" to learn of the death. Sports minister Michael Ring said it was as "a sad day for Ireland, the GAA, for Kerry and for Irish culture". Fianna Fáil leader Micheál Martin called him a GAA giant and gentleman.

Ó Sé's fellow Kerry legend Pat Spillane said he was "heartbroken". John O'Mahony, who both played against and managed against Ó Sé, said he was "deeply shocked". Dara Ó Cinnéide described the deceased as "an exception to every rule". Joe Kernan, whose Armagh team triumphed over Ó Sé's Kerry team in the 2002 All-Ireland Senior Football Championship Final, said: "The reaction to his death up here in Ulster has been incredible. Every GAA man, woman and child in any part of the country felt they knew Páidí. He was just one of those great characters that people loved. It's hard to believe he's gone". Colm Cooper, who first played for Kerry when Ó Sé was manager, was said to be devastated.

There was an outpouring of grief on Twitter. Many personalities used it to express their sorrow. Tadhg Kennelly wrote on Twitter, "Woke up to find the sad news of another Kerry hero who has gone to the "kingdom of Heaven"." Kevin Cassidy wrote, "Shocked to hear of the passing of Paidi O Se wat a man typified all that I love about the GAA skill heart passion had it all and a great guy". Aidan Walsh wrote, "Very sad to hear about Paudie o Shea..one of the best footballers of all time." Marty Morrissey wrote, "Heartbroken."

Kerry GAA released the following statement: "It is with deep regret that Coiste Chontae Chiarraí has been informed of the unexpected death earlier this morning of one of the county's most outstanding footballers, Páidí Ó Sé. The Chairman of Coiste Chontae Chiarrai, Mr Patrick O'Sullivan, on behalf of all GAA Gaels, wishes to express his deep sympathy to the Ó Sé family on this sad occasion."

President Ó Néill said: "There was hardly a person on the island of Ireland, never mind in the GAA, who did not recognise or know of Páidí Ó Sé, such was his contribution to the Association and to Irish life over a prolonged period."

The body of Páidí Ó Sé lay in repose at his home in Ceann Trá, with "a constant stream of mourners" seen going in and out during the wake.

Ó Sé was also remembered by the BBC at their 2012 Sports Personality of the Year awards ceremony, which was held the evening after his death. Des Cahill of RTÉ Sport called it a "fantastic gesture" by the broadcaster in the neighbouring country.

== Honours ==
=== Player ===
Schools titles

- 4 O'Sullivan Cups [Kerry Colleges] (1971, 1972, 1973, 1974)
- 2 Munster College As (1972, 1973)
- 1 Munster College B (1974)

Underage titles

- 4 Munster Under-21 Football Championships (1973, 1974, 1975, 1976)
- 3 All-Ireland Under 21 Football Championships (1973, 1975, 1976)

Senior titles

- 8 All-Ireland Senior Football Championships (1975, 1978, 1979, 1980, 1981, 1984, 1985, 1986)
- 11 Munster Senior Football Championships (1975, 1976, 1977, 1978, 1979, 1980, 1981, 1982, 1984, 1985, 1986)
- 4 National Football Leagues (1974, 1977, 1982, 1984)
- 4 Railway Cups (1976, 1978, 1981, 1982)
- 2 County Senior Championships (1984, 1985)

Individual

- 5 All Stars (1981, 1982, 1983, 1984, 1985)
- In May 2020, a public poll conducted by RTÉ.ie named Ó Sé in the full-back line alongside nephew Marc and Seamus Moynihan in a team of footballers who had won All Stars during the era of The Sunday Game

=== Manager ===
Kerry

- 2 All-Ireland Senior Football Championships (1997, 2000)
- 6 Munster Senior Football Championships (1996, 1997, 1998, 2000, 2001, 2003)
- 1 All-Ireland Under 21 Football Championship (1995)
- 2 Munster Under-21 Football Championships (1993, 1995)
- 1 National Football League (1997)

Westmeath

- 1 Leinster Senior Football Championship (2004)

West Kerry

- 3 County Senior Championships (1984, 1985 [Player/Manager] 1990)

Achievements
Preceded by Ambrose O'Donovan (Kerry)	All-Ireland SFC winning captain 1985	Succeeded by Tommy Doyle (Kerry)
Preceded by Seán Boylan (Meath)	All-Ireland Senior Football Final winning manager 1997	Succeeded by John O'Mahony (Galway)
Preceded by Seán Boylan (Meath)	All-Ireland SFC winning manager 2000	Succeeded by John O'Mahony (Galway)
Sporting positions
Preceded by Ambrose O'Donovan	Kerry Senior Football Captain; 1985	Succeeded by Tommy Doyle
Preceded by Ogie Moran	Kerry Senior Football Manager; 1996–2003	Succeeded by Jack O'Connor
Preceded by Luke Dempsey	Westmeath Senior Football Manager; 2003–2005	Succeeded by Tomás Ó Flatharta
Preceded by John Kennedy	Clare Senior Football Manager; 2006–2007	Succeeded by Frank Doherty
