= Rónán Ó Flatharta =

Kerry Gaelic footballer

Personal information
- Born: County Kerry, Ireland
- Height: 6 ft 0 in (183 cm)

Sport
- Sport: Gaelic football
- Position: Half Back
Club
- Years: Club
- An Ghaeltacht
Club titles
- Kerry titles: 2
- Munster titles: 1
Inter-county*
Years	County	Apps (scores)
2004–2009	Kerry	0 (0–00)
Inter-county titles
- Munster titles: 3
- All-Irelands: 3
- NFL: 3
- *Inter County team apps and scores correct as of 13:00, 26 August 2008 (UTC).

Rónán Ó Flatharta is an Irish Gaelic footballer who plays for An Ghaeltacht and at senior level for the Kerry county team.

He provides defensive cover for Kerry as a wing-back. Ó Flatharta made two appearances for Kerry in 2007, both in the National Football League against Limerick and Fermanagh. He did not feature in the Munster Senior Football Championship or All-Ireland Senior Football Championship, both of which Kerry won by beating Cork in each final. He played wing back in the National Football League final in 2008 when Kerry lost to Derry.

Ó Flatharta is known for his tough play. In the Fermanagh game he received two yellow cards, and was sent off by the referee.

Ó Flatharta was part of the Dingle CBS team that won the All Ireland Colleges title in 2001. In the same year he also won a Munster title with the Kerry minor team. At club level he has won 2 Kerry Senior Football Championships as well as a Munster championship.
