= Pat Harte =

Irish Gaelic footballer

Personal information
- Native name: Pádraig Ó hAirt (Irish)
- Born: 1983 (age 42–43) Castlebar, County Mayo
- Height: 6 ft 2 in (188 cm)

Sport
- Sport: Gaelic football
- Position: Midfield
Club
- Years: Club
- Ballina Stephenites
Club titles
- Mayo titles: 3
- Connacht titles: 2
- All-Ireland Titles: 1
Inter-county
Years	County	Apps (scores)
2004-2009	Mayo	35 (3-16)
Inter-county titles
- Connacht titles: 3

Pat Harte is an Irish Gaelic footballer who plays for Ballina and the Mayo county team. He is a midfielder. Harte's recent successes include reaching the All-Ireland Senior Football Championship 2006 final, although Kerry beat Mayo 4-15 to 3–5.
