= Marooned (2004 film) =

- Genre: Documentary
- Directed by: Pat Collins
- Starring: Páidí Ó Sé
- Country of origin: Ireland

Production
- Running time: 1 hour

Original release
- Network: RTÉ One
- Release: January 2013

Marooned is an hour-long fly-on-the-wall documentary which followed the success of the Westmeath senior football team that won the 2004 Leinster Senior Football Championship Final, the county's first ever title at senior level, under the guidance of Páidí Ó Sé.

The documentary focused on Ó Sé who had taken over as Westmeath manager after departing Kerry in acrimonious circumstances. During Marooned Ó Sé admitted that managing Westmeath against his former team was "the hardest day of my life outside bereavements and things like that". Ó Sé did not inform the players that a documentary was being filmed.

First shown on RTÉ One, RTÉ again aired Marooned in January 2013 following Ó Sé's death the previous month. Setanta Sports also aired it twice over the Christmas period - 21 December at 21.45 and 29 December at 22.30.

Pat Collins, known for films on the writers John McGahern and Michael Hartnett, directed.
