= Dara Ó Cinnéide =

Kerry Gaelic footballer (born 1975)

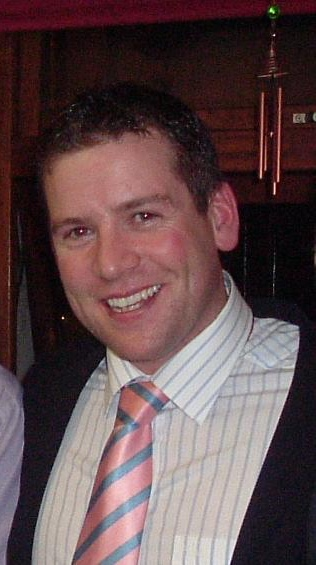

Personal information
- Native name: Dara Ó Cinnéide (Irish)
- Born: 25 April 1975 (age 51) Dublin, Republic of Ireland
- Occupation: Broadcaster
- Height: 5 ft 10 in (178 cm)

Sport
- Sport: Gaelic football
- Position: Full-forward
Club
Years	Club	Apps (scores)
1991–2007	An Ghaeltacht	37 (10-150)
Club titles
- Kerry titles: 2
- Munster titles: 1
- All-Ireland Titles: 0
Inter-county
Years	County	Apps (scores)
1993–2005	Kerry	54 (11–149)
Inter-county titles
- Munster titles: 8
- All-Irelands: 3
- NFL: 2
- All Stars: 0

Dara Ó Cinnéide (born 25 April 1975 in Dublin) is an Irish former Gaelic footballer who played for his local club An Ghaeltacht and at senior level for the Kerry county team from 1995 until 2005. Ó Cinnéide captained Kerry to the All-Ireland title in 2004.

== Biography ==
Dara Ó Cinnéide was born in Dublin in 1975, but grew up near An Daingean, County Kerry. A native Irish-speaker, he was educated at the local national school and later attended Dingle CBS. Ó Cinnéide currently works as a radio broadcaster with the Irish-language station RTÉ Raidió na Gaeltachta, where he produces the daily afternoon show An Saol Ó Dheas, and he also presents the main weekly GAA show Seó Spóirt on the Irish-language channel TG4. He also writes a Gaelic football column for the Irish Examiner and has been a pundit on RTÉ's premier Gaelic games programme, The Sunday Game.

== Playing career ==
=== Club ===
Ó Cinnéide played his club football with his local club called an Ghaeltacht and enjoyed much success during his career. He first came to prominence with the club at underage levels, however, he enjoyed little success in these grades.

In 2000 an Ghaeltacht reached the final of the county senior championship for the very first time. Ó Cinnéide's side were the red-hot favourites going into the match, however, all did not go as planned as Dr. Crokes took charge. A hard-fought 1–4 to 0–6 score line resulted in defeat for an Ghaeltacht.

In 2001 an Ghaeltacht were out to atone for this defeat. The team regrouped well and reached a second consecutive county final. Tralee-based club Austin Stacks provided the opposition on this occasion, however, Ó Cinnéide's side were well prepared. A conclusive 1–13 to 0–10 victory gave Ó Cinnéide, who chipped in with five points, a county winners' medal.

An Ghaeltacht surrendered their club title in 2002, however, the following year Ó Cinnéide's side were back in the county championship decider. Laune Rangers were the opponents on this occasion, however, the game ended in a 0–10 apiece draw. The replay a fortnight later was a much more conclusive affair. A 0–12 to 2–4 score line gave an Ghaeltacht the victory and gave Ó Cinnéide a second county winners' medal in three years. This victory allowed the club to represent Kerry in the provincial club championship. A successful campaign saw Ó Cinnéide's side reach the provincial final against St. Senan's of Clare. A close game developed, however, the Kerrymen held on in the end to secure a 1–8 to 1–6 victory, giving Ó Cinnéide a Munster club winners' medal. An Ghaeltacht continued their march in the All-Ireland series and lined out on St. Patrick's Day 2004 in the All-Ireland club championship final. Caltra, a club from County Galway, provided the opposition and an exciting game developed. Ó Cinnéide faced the heartbreak of missing a goal in the dying seconds and eventually losing by just a single point – 0–13 to 0–12.

The following few years saw Ó Cinnéide enjoy little success with the club after the victories of the earlier parts of the decade. He retired from club football in 2007 following an Ghaeltacht's 1–3 to 0–5 defeat of Kerins O'Rahilly's to take the county league title.

He also won a New York Senior Football Championship title in 1999 with the Kerry New York club.

=== Minor, under-21 & junior ===
Ó Cinnéide first came to prominence on the inter-county scene as a member of the Kerry minor football team in the early 1990s. He lined out in the provincial decider in that grade in 1992 with Cork providing the opposition. A close game developed; however, both sides finished level. The replay was also a close affair but proved more conclusive. Kerry were defeated by their greatest rivals on that occasion by 3–6 to 2–7.

Ó Cinnéide was eligible for the minor grade again in 1993; however, Kerry were knocked out of the provincial championship at a very early stage.

In 1994 Ó Cinnéide was picked for the Kerry junior football team. He played no part in the team's hard-fought 1–6 to 0–8 Munster final victory over Clare; however, he was included on the team for the subsequent All-Ireland decider. Galway provided the opposition on that occasion, however, the game turned into a rout. 'The Kingdom' proved too strong for the Connacht champions and a 0–15 to 0–4 victory secured an All-Ireland winners' medal in the junior grade.

That same year Ó Cinnéide joined the Kerry under-21 team. It was an unsuccessful year for the team in that grade. In 1995 Ó Cinnéide was still underage and lined out in the Munster Quarter-Final with Clare, Kerry ran out 1–13 to 0–07 winners with Ó Cinnéide scoring 0-08. Up next in the semi were Limerick. Another easy win was the result for Kerry this time on a 4–17 to 2–5 scoreline, with 2-06 from Ó Cinnéide. This set up a first Munster Under 21 final where Waterford were the opponents and a rout ensued. A 1–21 to 2–5 trouncing gave Ó Cinnéide a Munster winners' medal in the under-21 grade in a game where he scored 1-09. In the All Ireland semi final Kerry faced Ulster champions Donegal. In a close game and with 0-2 from Ó Cinnéide, Kerry won on a 2–6 to 1–5 scoreline. Kerry qualified to play Mayo in the All-Ireland final. After the highs of the Munster final victory, Kerry were held to a draw and a replay was required after a 2–12 to 3-9, with 1-3 from Ó Cinnéide. That game was also a close affair, however, Kerry's goal-scoring ability proved the key. A 3–10 to 1–12 score line, 1-3 once more from him, saw Kerry claim the victory and gave Ó Cinnéide an All-Ireland winners' medal with the Kerry under-21 team. He played all 6 of Kerrys games and was their top scorer with 5-31.

In 1996 Ó Cinnéide was in his last year as a member of the Kerry under-21 team. A second Munster winners' medal was secured after an absolute trouncing of Clare in the provincial decider. The 3–14 to 0–6 victory put Kerry on the All-Ireland trail once again. Cavan provided the opposition in the subsequent All-Ireland decider, however, that game was far from a rout. Kerry had the upper hand for much of the game and went on to win by 1–17 to 2–10. It was Ó Cinnéide's second All-Ireland winners' medal in the under-21 grade.

=== Senior ===
By this stage Ó Cinnéide was also a key member of the Kerry senior football team. He made his senior debut in a National Football League game against Donegal in 1994, however, he had to wait until the following year for his senior championship debut to come in a provincial semi-final against Limerick. Kerry won that day and Ó Cinnéide lined out in the subsequent Munster final against archrivals Cork. Expectations were high that 'the Kingdom' could defeat 'the Rebels' and break back into the big time after a period in the wilderness. The game was a disappointing one for Ó Cinnéide as his side lost by 0–15 to 1–9.

In 1996 Kerry regrouped under new manager Páidí Ó Sé and Ó Cinnéide lined out in his second provincial decider. Cork provided the opposition once again, however, on this occasion Kerry were a different team. A 0–14 to 0–11 victory gave Ó Cinnéide his first Munster winners' medal in the senior grade and kick-started the Kerry football revival. Kerry's next assignment was an All-Ireland semi-final meeting with Mayo. In spite of claiming the provincial title, Kerry were still not the finished article. Ó Cinnéide's side were eventually defeated by 2–13 to 1–10.

1997 saw Kerry through down an early marker with regard to their All-Ireland ambitions. The team reached the final of the National League that year with Cork providing the opposition in Páirc Uí Chaoimh. A 3–7 to 1–8 victory gave Ó Cinnéide a winners' medal in Gaelic football's secondary competition. Later that summer Kerry reached the Munster final once again. Clare provided the opposition on this occasion; however, in spite of shocking the Kerry men five years earlier, there was no shock this time. A 1–13 to 0–11 victory saw Ó Cinnéide add a second Munster winners' medal to his collection. A subsequent defeat of Cavan saw Kerry qualify for their first All-Ireland final in eleven years. Mayo, the defeated finalists of the previous year, provided the opposition. Mayo went on a scoring spree during the match, capturing 1–2 inside two minutes. Maurice Fitzgerald was the start player for Kerry. He scored nine points throughout the game while Mayo froze and were held scoreless for the last twenty minutes. A 0–13 to 1–7 score line gave Kerry the title and gave Ó Cinnéide an All-Ireland winners' medal.

Kerry continued their march again in 1998 with a Munster final showdown with Tipperary. For the third year in succession 'the Kingdom' proved the provincial masters, and a 0–17 to 1–10 win gave Ó Cinnéide a third Munster title. Kerry were the favourites to retain their All-Ireland title, however, a narrow 0–13 to 1–9 defeat by Kildare in the All-Ireland semi-final brought an end to their All-Ireland quest.

In 1999 Kerry were attempting to secure a fourth provincial title in succession. Cork put an end to this dream with a 2–10 to 2–4 win over their great rivals in the Munster final. With that Kerry were dumped out of the championship.

After a low point the previous year, Kerry were back in the provincial decider again in 2000. Ó Cinnéide lined out in his sixth Munster final, his second with Clare as opposition. In a disappointing match as regards a contest, Kerry walloped 'the Banner men' by 3–15 to 0–8. It was Ó Cinnéide's fourth Munster medal. Kerry had firmly established their All-Ireland contender credentials, however, the All-Ireland series proved difficult. Ó Cinnéide's side drew with Armagh in the semi-final, while the replay proved just as tense. Both sides finished level after seventy minutes once again and it took a period of extra-time to find a winner. Kerry narrowly emerged from that game as the 2–15 to 1–15 winners and booked a place in the Millennium All-Ireland final. Galway provided the opposition in what was their second championship decider appearance in three years. In a game to forget both sides missed easy chances and seemed apprehensive about taking a lead. Galway trailed by seven points at one stage, but clawed their way back to secure a 0–14 apiece draw. The replay was a much more conclusive affair. Galway worked the ball the length of the field to Declan Meehan who scored a goal to give the westerners a boost. A disputed free with seventeen minutes left in the game gave Kerry a lead which they would not relinquish. At the full-time whistle Kerry were the champions by 0–17 to 1–10. It was Ó Cinnéide's second All-Ireland winners' medal.

Kerry swept through the provincial series with ease again in 2001. A 0–19 to 1–13 defeat of Cork gave Ó Cinnéide a fifth Munster winners' medal and gave Kerry a boost in their All-Ireland ambitions. In a new innovation called the All-Ireland qualifiers series, Kerry's provincial victory allowed them to advance to the All-Ireland quarter-final. An exciting draw and a replay with Dublin at Semple Stadium gave Ó Cinnéide's side the right to advance to an All-Ireland semi-final showdown with Meath. In one of the lowest points ever for Kerry football, Ó Cinnéide's side were absolutely demolished by 'the Royals' on a score line of 2–14 to 0–5.

In 2002 Kerry crashed out of the provincial championship at an early stage. In spite of this Ó Cinnéide's side still had a chance of winning the All-Ireland title via the scenic route in the All-Ireland qualifiers. After successfully negotiating through the early stages Kerry trounced Galway in the All-Ireland quarter-final before stuffing archrivals Cork in a unique all-Munster All-Ireland semi-final. The subsequent All-Ireland decider pitted Kerry against Armagh in one of the great finals of recent years. The first-half saw everything going Kerry's way while Armagh floundered. The Ulster men lost John McEntee to concussion while Oisín McConville missed a penalty just before the interval. As it stood Armagh trailed by four points at half-time and Ó Cinnéide's side looked to be in the driving seat. A different Armagh team emerged in the second-half. McConville compensated for his earlier miss by scoring a key goal in the 55th minute. Kerry froze after this and failed to score for the rest of the match as Armagh went on to narrowly win their first All-Ireland by 1–12 to 0–14.

Kerry regrouped after this blow and reached the provincial decider once again in 2003. Limerick provided the opposition; however, they were no match for 'the Kingdom'. A 1–11 to 0–9 victory gave Ó Cinnéide a sixth Munster winners' medal. After an exciting game with Roscommon, Kerry advanced to an All-Ireland semi-final meeting with Tyrone. After being shocked in the latter stages of the two previous championships, Kerry were out to atone and were favourites going into the match. The Ulster men ambushed 'the Kingdom', however, and Ó Cinnéide's side faced another humiliation in Croke Park. A 0–13 to 0–6 defeat saw Tyrone advance to the All-Ireland final while Kerry were unceremoniously dumped out of the championship.

2004 saw Ó Cinnéide being appointed captain of the Kerry team. The year began well with Ó Cinnéide's side reaching the final of the National League. An exciting 3–11 to 1–6 victory saw Kerry claim the title and Ó Cinnéide picked up a second National League winners' medal. Kerry later booked their almost annual spot in the provincial final and, for the second year in succession, Limerick were the opponents. Surprisingly, that game ended in a 1–10 apiece draw. The replay was also a close-run affair; however, Kerry never really looked in danger of losing. A 3–10 to 2–9 victory gave Ó Cinnéide a seventh Munster winners' medal, while he also had the honour of lifting the Munster Cup on behalf of his team. The All-Ireland series proved no difficulty for Kerry, and 'the Kingdom' booked their place in the All-Ireland final against Mayo. An early goal from Alan Dillon gave the Connacht men some hope, however, the game was effectively over after twenty-five minutes when Colm Cooper scored Kerry's only goal of the day. The points kept coming from Ó Cinnéide's team and an injury-time Michael Conroy goal was nothing but a consolation for Mayo. A 1–20 to 2–9 victory gave Ó Cinnéide a third All-Ireland winners' medal, while he also had the honour of lifting the famous Sam Maguire Cup.

In 2005 Kerry were hot favourites to retain their All-Ireland title. All was going to plan as Ó Cinnéide's side reached yet another provincial final. In a return to tradition, Cork were the opponents. A close game developed, however, in the end Kerry were the narrow winners by 1–11 to 0–11. It was Ó Cinnéide's eighth Munster winners' medal. Following this win Kerry cruised through the All-Ireland series to reach another championship decider with Tyrone providing the opposition. In one of the great finals of the decade, the result remained in doubt until the final whistle. Ó Cinnéide powered his team ahead with a goal after just six minutes. Tyrone responded in kind with a Peter Canavan goal just before half-time. Tomás Ó Sé launched the Kerry comeback in the 57th minute with Kerry's second goal; however, it was too later. Tyrone hung on to win by 1–16 to 2–10. It was Ó Cinnéide's second defeat in an All-Ireland final.

Early in 2006 Ó Cinnéide announced his retirement from inter-county football.

=== Inter-provincial ===
Ó Cinnéide has also lined out with Munster in the inter-provincial series of games and enjoyed some success. He first lined out with his province in 1996 when Munster were drawn to play Ulster in the semi-final. That game ended in a draw, however, Ó Cinnéide's side narrowly won the replay by a single point. Leinster provided the opposition in the subsequent final. The southerners were completely outclassed on that occasion and they were defeated by 1–13 to 0–19.

After an absence of one year, Ó Cinnéide was picked for duty with Munster again in 1998, albeit as a substitute. On that occasion Munster were narrowly defeated by Leinster once again.

In 1999 Ó Cinnéide was back on the Munster starting fifteen. After a draw and an emphatic win over Ulster, Ó Cinnéide's side subsequently faced Connacht in the series decider. A low-scoring game saw Munster win by 0–10 to 0–7 and Ó Cinnéide added a Railway Cup winners' medal to his collection.

Ó Cinnéide played with his province for the last time in 2002. On that occasion Munster were narrowly defeated by Ulster in the semi-final stage of the competition.

== Post-playing career ==
In January 2021, Ó Cinnéide, aged 45, succeeded Seán Ó Catháin as chairman of An Ghaeltacht. He was previously a selector with the club in 2017 and is an opponent of professionalism within the game.

== Honours ==
=== An Ghaeltacht ===
- All-Ireland Senior Club Football Championship:
  - Winner (0):
  - Runner-up (1): 2004
- Munster Senior Club Football Championship:
  - Winner (1): 2003
- Kerry Senior Football Championship:
  - Winner (2): 2001, 2003
  - Runner-up (1): 2000
- Kerry County Club Football Championship:
  - Winner (3): 2001, 2002, 2005
  - Runner-up (3): 1999, 2000, 2003
- Kerry County Football League – Division 1:
  - Winner (1):: 2007
- Kerry Intermediate Football Championship:
  - Winner (1):: 1998
- Kerry Junior Football Championship:
  - Winner (1):: 1993
- Kerry Novice Football Championship:
  - Winner (1):: 1992
- West Kerry Senior Football Championship:
  - Winner (7):: 1991, 1997, 1998, 2000, 2001, 2002, 2006

=== Kerry ===
- All-Ireland Senior Football Championship:
  - Winner (3): 1997, 2000, 2004 (c)
  - Runner-up (2): 2002, 2005
- Munster Senior Football Championship:
  - Winner (8): 1996, 1997, 1998, 2000, 2001, 2003, 2004 (c), 2005
  - Runner-up (2): 1995, 1999
- National Football League:
  - Winner (1): 1996–97, 2004 (c)
- All-Ireland Under-21 Football Championship:
  - Winner (1): 1995, 1996
- Munster Under-21 Football Championship:
  - Winner (1): 1995, 1996
- Munster Minor Football Championship:
  - Winner (0):
  - Runner-up (1): 1992
- All-Ireland Junior Football Championship:
  - Winner (1): 1994
- Munster Junior Football Championship:
  - Winner (1): 1994 (sub)

=== Munster ===
- Railway Cup:
  - Winner (1): 1999
  - Runner-up (1): 1996

Sporting positions
Preceded by Mike McCarthy	Kerry Senior Football Captain; 2004	Succeeded by Declan O'Sullivan
Achievements
Preceded by Peter Canavan (Tyrone)	All-Ireland SFC winning captain 2004	Succeeded by Brian Dooher (Tyrone)
