= Marc Ó Sé =

Kerry Gaelic footballer (born 1980)

Personal information
- Native name: Marc Ó Sé (Irish)
- Born: 25 April 1980 (age 46) Tralee, County Kerry, Ireland
- Occupation: Secondary school teacher
- Height: 1.83 m (6 ft 0 in)

Sport
- Sport: Gaelic football
- Position: Right corner-back
Club
- Years: Club
- 1997–2018: An Ghaeltacht
Club titles
- Kerry titles: 2
- Munster titles: 1
Inter-county*
Years	County	Apps (scores)
2002–2016	Kerry	88 (1–18)
Inter-county titles
- Munster titles: 10
- All-Irelands: 5
- NFL: 3
- All Stars: 3
- *Inter County team apps and scores correct as of 20:26, 13 October 2016.

Marc Ó Sé (born 25 April 1980) is an Irish sportsman. A teacher by profession, he works in the CBS in Tralee County Kerry, he played Gaelic football for the Kerry county team from 2002 until 2016 and played with his local club team An Ghaeltacht until 2018. He has played right across the back line for Kerry. His older brothers, Darragh and Tomás, also represented Kerry.

== Playing career ==
=== Early years: 2002–2005 ===
In his rookie season of 2002, Ó Sé impressed throughout the All-Ireland Senior Football Championship in a Kerry team under the management of his uncle Páidí. In the final of that year he marked Diarmuid Marsden of Armagh. Marc was given a torrid time as Kerry let what looked like a certain win with 25 mins to go slip and lost by a single point, 1-12 to 0-14.

In 2003, Kerry reached the All-Ireland semi-final, but again suffered disappointment. After a terribly below par performance against a Tyrone team who used what analyst Pat Spillane (himself of Kerry origin) called "puke football" to suffocate Kerry,

2004 was a busy year for Ó Sé. First he lost the All Ireland Club Championship with his club. He then won the National League beating Galway in a cracking game by a single point. He starred in the 2004 campaign showing great defensive awareness and beautiful on the ball skill. Kerry won the title, defeating Mayo 1-20 to 2-09 in what was described as a 'rout'. Ó Sé's brother Tomás won the player of the year award, but despite his fine performances Ó Sé did not win an All-Star.

In 2005, Ó Sé continued to perform for Kerry who this time were narrowly defeated by Tyrone. Many people from around the country felt the fact that Kerry had not been tested in the championship in almost a year and a half, and the fact that this was Tyrone's 10th game of a gruelling campaign as key factors in the final result. Again Ó Sé was overlooked in the All Star selection despite a sterling campaign.

=== Middle years: 2006–2009 ===
Kerry bounced back in 2006. The team defeated Galway in the final of the National League again in a far less impressive game as the corresponding fixture 2 years earlier. Kerry were shocking in the Munster Championship, in which they were nearly defeated by minnows Waterford and eventually defeated in a replay against Cork. However, this proved to be a false dawn for the rest of Ireland as Kerry regrouped. They beat Longford in the qualifier and were written off for their quarter final against Armagh. Armagh and Tyrone were perceived as Kerry's bogey teams in recent years and Armagh were expected to deal with Kerry in a similar fashion as Tyrone had done the previous year. As it happened, Kerry produced a masterful second half display achieved a 10-point turnaround. Marc was immense and scored 2 glorious points from the back, many experts said that there were few forwards in the game who could have taken their scores as well. Kerry gained revenge against Cork in the Semi-Final before handing Mayo and even more severe beating than they had two years earlier. Kerry had the game wrapped up after only 10 minutes with a score of 2-04 to 0-00 and despite a mini revival by Mayo, Kerry won comprehensively, 4-15 to 3-05. Marc won an All-Star award in 2006.

In 2007, Ó Sé won the Munster championship with Kerry. The team advanced to the All-Ireland series, and reached the final, in which they beat Billy Morgan's Cork side 3-13 to 1-9. It was Kerry's 35th all-Ireland. Marc's performances were recognised as he won an All-Star and was named Texaco Footballer of the Year. His brothers Darragh and Tomás were also included, making it the first time three brothers had been selected for the All-Star team.

In 2008, Ó Sé reached the National League and Munster finals with Kerry, but lost both. The team went on to reach their fifth consecutive All-Ireland final, but lost to Tyrone by four points.

In 2009, Ó Sé won the All-Ireland again.

=== Later years: 2010–2014 ===
He won his fifth All Ireland medal in 2014 when Kerry defeated Donegal.

In October 2016, Ó Sé announced his retirement from Inter-county football. In total Ó Sé won five-All-Ireland titles and 10 Munster titles and the Player of the Year in 2007 along with three All Star awards.

== Career statistics ==
Team	Season	National League			Munster		All-Ireland		Total	
Team	Season	Division	Apps	Score	Apps	Score	Apps	Score	Apps	Score
Kerry	2002	Division 1A	7	0-02	3	0-00	6	0-00	16	0-02
Kerry	2003	Division 1A	6	1-00	1	0-00	2	0-01	9	1-01
Kerry	2004	Division 1A	4	0-01	4	0-00	3	0-01	11	0-02
Kerry	2005	Division 1A	4	0-01	3	0-02	3	0-01	10	0-04
Kerry	2006	Division 1A	9	0-00	4	0-00	4	0-02	17	0-02
Kerry	2007	Division 1A	7	0-01	2	0-01	3	0-00	12	0-02
Kerry	2008	Division 1	8	0-00	2	0-00	5	0-00	15	0-00
Kerry	2009	Division 1	4	0-01	2	0-00	6	0-00	12	0-01
Kerry	2010	Division 1	5	0-00	4	0-01	1	0-00	10	0-01
Kerry	2011	Division 1	5	0-00	3	0-00	3	0-00	11	0-00
Kerry	2012	Division 1	8	0-00	1	0-00	4	0-01	13	0-01
Kerry	2013	Division 1	7	0-00	3	0-02	2	0-00	12	0-02
Kerry	2014	Division 1	5	0-00	2	0-00	4	0-01	11	0-01
Kerry	2015	Division 1	0	0-00	3	0-00	2	0-00	5	0-00
Kerry	2016	Division 1	7	0-03	1	0-00	2	0-00	10	1-23
Total			86	1-09	38	0-06	50	0-07	174	1-22

== Honours ==
=== Team ===
Kerry

- All-Ireland Senior Football Championship (5): 2004, 2006, 2007, 2009, 2014
- Munster Senior Football Championship (10): 2003, 2004, 2005, 2007, 2010, 2011, 2013, 2014, 2015, 2016
- National Football League (3): 2004, 2006, 2009
- Munster Minor Football Championship (1): 1998

=== Individual ===
Awards

- Texaco Footballer of the Year (1): 2007
- All-Stars Footballer of the Year (1): 2007
- All-Star Awards (3): 2006, 2007, 2011
- In May 2020, a public poll conducted by RTÉ.ie named Ó Sé in the full-back line alongside uncle Páidí and Seamus Moynihan in a team of footballers who had won All Stars during the era of The Sunday Game.
