= Darragh Ó Sé =

Kerry Gaelic footballer (born 1975)

Personal information
- Native name: Darragh Ó Sé (Irish)
- Born: 5 March 1975 (age 51) Tralee, County Kerry, Ireland
- Occupation: Businessman/auctioneer
- Height: 6 ft 1 in (185 cm)

Sport
- Sport: Gaelic football
- Position: Midfielder
Club
Years	Club	Apps (scores)
1992–2011	An Ghaeltacht	81 (1-31)
Club titles
- Kerry titles: 2
- Munster titles: 2
- All-Ireland Titles: 0
Inter-county
Years	County	Apps (scores)
1994–2009	Kerry	81 (1-31)
Inter-county titles
- Munster titles: 9
- All-Irelands: 6
- NFL: 3
- All Stars: 4

Darragh Ó Sé (born 5 March 1975 in Ard an Bhóthair, Ventry, County Kerry) is an Irish former Gaelic footballer. He plays with his local club, An Ghaeltacht, and was a member at senior level of the Kerry county team from 1997 until he announced his retirement in early 2010. Ó Sé has made 81 championship appearances, scoring one goal and 31 points. He also appeared for Kerry in 95 National Football League games scoring one goal and 26 points. He is regarded as one of the greatest midfielders of all time. His younger brothers Tomás and Marc are also Gaelic footballers who have represented Kerry at the All-Ireland Senior Club Football Championship

== Playing career ==
=== Club ===
Ó Sé played his club football with his local club called an Ghaeltacht and enjoyed a great deal of success during his career. He made his debut with the club's senior team in 1992 and was an ever-present fixture at midfield.

In 2000 an Ghaeltacht reached the final of the county senior championship for the very first time. Ó Sé's side were the red-hot favourites going into the match; however, all did not go as planned as Dr. Croke's took charge. A hard-fought 1–4 to 0–6 score line resulted in defeat for an Ghaeltacht.

In 2001 an Ghaeltacht were out to atone for this defeat. The team regrouped well and reached a second consecutive county final. Tralee-based club Austin Stack's provided the opposition on this occasion; however, Ó Sé's side were well prepared. A conclusive 1–13 to 0–10 victory gave Ó Sé a county winners' medal.

An Ghaeltacht surrendered their club title in 2002; however, the following year Ó Sé's side were back in the county championship decider. Laune Rangers were the opponents on this occasion, however, the game ended in a 0–10 apiece draw. The replay a fortnight later was a much more conclusive affair. A 0–12 to 2–4 score line gave an Ghaeltacht the victory and gave Ó Cinnéide a second county winners' medal in three years. This victory allowed the club to represent Kerry in the provincial club championship. A successful campaign saw Ó Sé's side reach the provincial final against St. Senan's of Clare. A close game developed, however, the Kerrymen held on in the end to secure a 1–8 to 1–6 victory, giving Ó Sé a Munster club winners' medal. An Ghaeltacht continued their march in the All-Ireland series and lined out on St. Patrick's Day 2004 in the All-Ireland club championship final. Caltra, a club from County Galway, provided the opposition and an exciting game developed. Dara Ó Cinnéide faced the heartbreak of missing a goal in the dying seconds as an Ghaeltacht lost out by just a single point – 0–13 to 0–12.

The following few years saw Ó Sé enjoy little success with the club after the victories of the earlier parts of the decade.

=== Minor & under-21 ===
Ó Sé first came to prominence on the inter-county scene as a member of the Kerry minor football team in the early 1990s. He first lined out with his native county in that grade in 1993, however, Kerry were knocked out of the provincial championship at a very early stage.

Ó Sé subsequently joined the Kerry under-21 team in 1994. While it was an unsuccessful year for the team in that grade, Ó Sé's nailed down his position at midfield and the following year lined out in his first Munster under-21 final. Opponents Waterford were inflicted with a 1–21 to 2–5 trouncing, giving Ó Sé a Munster winners' medal in the under-21 grade. Kerry later qualified to play Mayo in the All-Ireland final. After the highs of the Munster final victory, Kerry were held to a draw and a replay was required. That game was also a close affair, however, Kerry's goal-scoring ability proved the key. A 3–10 to 1–12 score line saw Kerry claim the victory and gave Ó Sé an All-Ireland winners' medal with the Kerry under-21 team.

In 1996 Ó Sé was in his final year as a member of the Kerry under-21 team. A second Munster winners' medal was secured after an absolute trouncing of Clare in the provincial decider. The 3–14 to 0–6 victory put Kerry on the All-Ireland trail once again. Cavan provided the opposition in the subsequent All-Ireland decider, however, that game was far from a rout. Kerry had the upper hand for much of the game and went on to win by 1–17 to 2–10. It was Ó Sé's second All-Ireland winners' medal in the under-21 grade.

=== College ===
He played for Dublin Institute of Technology, with whom he won a Trench Cup in 1995.

=== Senior ===
By this stage Ó Sé was also a member of the Kerry senior football team. He made his senior debut in a National Football League game against Donegal in the 1993–94 season. Ó Sé later made his championship debut against Limerick; however, Kerry were defeated on that occasion.

In 1995 Ó Sé played in his first senior Munster final against archrivals Cork. Expectations were high that 'the Kingdom' could defeat 'the Rebels' and break back into the big time after a three-year period in the wilderness. The game was a disappointing one for Ó Sé as his side lost by 0–15 to 1–9.

In 1996 Ó Sé's uncle Páidí took over as manager, and Kerry's fortunes improved. Cork provided the opposition once again in that year's provincial final, however, on this occasion Kerry were a different team. A 0–14 to 0–11 victory gave Ó Sé his first Munster winners' medal in the senior grade and kick-started the Kerry football revival. Kerry's next assignment was an All-Ireland semi-final meeting with Mayo. In spite of claiming the provincial title, Kerry were still not the finished article. Ó Sé's side were eventually defeated by 2–13 to 1–10.

1997 saw Kerry through down an early marker with regard to their All-Ireland ambitions. The team reached the final of the National League that year with Cork providing the opposition in Páirc Uí Chaoimh. A 3–7 to 1–8 victory gave Ó Sé a winners' medal in Gaelic football's secondary competition. Later that summer Kerry reached the Munster final once again. Clare provided the opposition on this occasion; however, in spite of shocking the Kerry men five years earlier, there was no shock this time. A 1–13 to 0–11 victory saw Ó Sé add a second Munster winners' medal to his collection. A subsequent defeat of Cavan saw Kerry qualify for their first All-Ireland final in eleven years. Mayo, the defeated finalists of the previous year, provided the opposition. The westerners went on a scoring spree during the match, capturing 1–2 inside two minutes. Maurice Fitzgerald was the start player for Kerry. He scored nine points throughout the game while Mayo froze and were held scoreless for the last twenty minutes. A 0–13 to 1–7 score line gave Kerry the title and gave Ó Sé an All-Ireland winners' medal. Furthermore, Ó Sé had now started to stamp his authority as a quality midfielder and over the next 10 years would become one of the country's best.

Kerry continued their march again in 1998 with a Munster final showdown with Tipperary. For the third year in succession 'the Kingdom' proved the provincial masters, and a 0–17 to 1–10 win gave Ó Sé a third Munster title. Kerry were the favourites to retain their All-Ireland title; however, a narrow 0–13 to 1–9 defeat by a Mick O'Dwyer-managed Kildare in the semi-final brought an end to their All-Ireland quest.

In 1999 Kerry were attempting to secure a fourth provincial title in succession. Cork put an end to this dream with a 2–10 to 2–4 win over their great rivals in the Munster final. With that Kerry were dumped out of the championship.

After a low point the previous year, Kerry were back in the provincial decider again in 2000. Ó Sé lined out in his sixth Munster final, his second with Clare as opposition. In a disappointing match as regards a contest, Kerry walloped 'the Banner men' by 3–15 to 0–8. It was Ó Sé's fourth Munster medal. Kerry had firmly established their All-Ireland contender credentials, however, the All-Ireland series proved difficult. Ó Sé's side drew with Armagh in the semi-final, while the replay proved just as tense. Both sides finished level after seventy minutes once again and it took a period of extra-time to find a winner. Kerry narrowly emerged from that game as the 2–15 to 1–15 winners and booked a place in the Millennium All-Ireland final. Galway provided the opposition in what was their second championship decider appearance in three years. In a game to forget both sides missed easy chances and seemed apprehensive about taking a lead. Galway trailed by seven points at one stage, but clawed their way back to secure a 0–14 apiece draw. The replay was a much more conclusive affair. Galway worked the ball the length of the field to Declan Meehan who scored a goal to give the westerners a boost. A disputed free with seventeen minutes left in the game gave Kerry a lead which they would not relinquish. At the full-time whistle Kerry were the champions by 0–17 to 1–10. It was Ó Cinnéide's second All-Ireland winners' medal, while his performances also earned him an All-Star.

Kerry swept through the provincial series with ease again in 2001. A 0–19 to 1–13 defeat of Cork gave Ó Sé a fifth Munster winners' medal and gave Kerry a boost in their All-Ireland ambitions. In a new innovation called the All-Ireland qualifiers series, Kerry's provincial victory allowed them to advance to the All-Ireland quarter-final. An exciting draw and a replay with Dublin at Semple Stadium gave Ó Sé's side the right to advance to an All-Ireland semi-final showdown with Meath. There was some controversy leading up to the game with new squad member Eoin Brosnan getting the captaincy before the game, despite not yet having established himself as a regular. There was also great debate about the refusal to start the legendary Maurice Fitzgerald. Nonetheless, the public were expecting a classic. In one of the lowest points ever for Kerry football, Ó Sé's side were beaten by 'the Royals' on a score line of 2–14 to 0–5.

In 2002 Kerry faced more controversy. The team were forced to play a replay of their Munster semi-final against Cork only a few of days after the funeral of the brother of team manager Páidí Ó Sé and father of team members Darragh, Tomás and Marc Ó Sé. Cork took full advantage and Kerry embarked on a qualifier campaign which saw them account for Wicklow, Fermanagh and Kildare before they trounced reigning champions Galway in the All-Ireland quarter-final before stuffing archrivals Cork in a unique all-Munster All-Ireland semi-final. The subsequent All-Ireland decider pitted Kerry against Armagh in one of the great finals of recent years. The first-half saw everything going Kerry's way while Armagh floundered. The Ulster men lost John McEntee to concussion while Oisín McConville missed a penalty just before the interval. As it stood Armagh trailed by four points at half-time while Ó Sé gave an inspirational performance. A different Armagh team emerged in the second-half. McConville compensated for his earlier miss by scoring a key goal in the 55th minute. Kerry froze after this and failed to score for the rest of the match as Armagh went on to narrowly win their first All-Ireland by 1–12 to 0–14. In spite of this defeat Ó Sé picked up a second All Star.

Kerry regrouped after this blow and reached the provincial decider once again in 2003. Limerick provided the opposition; however, they were no match for 'the Kingdom'. A 1–11 to 0–9 victory gave Ó Sé a sixth Munster winners' medal. After an exciting game with Roscommon, Kerry advanced to an All-Ireland semi-final meeting with Tyrone. After being shocked in the latter stages of the two previous championships, Kerry were out to atone and were favourites going into the match. The whole team struggled; however, and Kerry looked like they were going to be left behind with the new "blanket defence" that was introduced by teams like Armagh and perfected by Tyrone. Many criticised this tactic as a means of stopping talented footballers like Ó Sé and Colm Cooper from playing but few could deny its effectiveness. A 0–13 to 0–6 defeat saw Tyrone advance to the All-Ireland final while Kerry were knocked out of the championship.

2004 saw Jack O'Connor take over as manager of the Kerry team. That year 'the Kingdom' booked their almost annual spot in the provincial final and, for the second year in succession, Limerick were the opponents. Surprisingly, that game ended in a 1–10 apiece draw. The replay was also a close-run affair; however, Kerry never really looked in danger of losing. A 3–10 to 2–9 victory gave Ó Sé a seventh Munster winners' medal. The All-Ireland series proved no difficulty for Kerry; however, Ó Sé picked up an injury in the semi-final which ruled him out of the final against Mayo. A 1–20 to 2–9 championship decider victory gave Kerry the victory.

In 2005 Kerry were hot favourites to retain their All-Ireland title. All was going to plan as Ó Sé's side reached yet another provincial final. In a return to tradition, Cork were the opponents. A close game developed, however, in the end Kerry were the narrow winners by 1–11 to 0–11. It was Ó Sé's eighth Munster winners' medal. Following this win Kerry cruised through the All-Ireland series to reach another championship decider with Tyrone providing the opposition. In one of the great finals of the decade, the result remained in doubt until the final whistle. Ó Cinnéide powered his team ahead with a goal after just six minutes. Tyrone responded in kind with a Peter Canavan goal just before half-time. Tomás Ó Sé launched the Kerry comeback in the 57th minute with Kerry's second goal; however, it was too late. Tyrone hung on to win by 1–16 to 2–10. It was Ó Sé's second defeat in an All-Ireland final.

In 2006 Kerry reached the final of the National League and played Galway. Ó Sé's side could only manage three points in the opening half; however, the introduction of Eoin Brosnan transformed the team. At the end of the seventy minutes a 2–12 to 0–10 score line gave Kerry their 18th National League title. The league win was a false dawn as Kerry went out tamely to Cork in a replay of the Munster final. The team, however, bounced back against Longford to set up a meeting with Armagh in the All-Ireland quarter-final. At half-time it looked as though the Ulser hoodoo would strike again but Kerry blitzed the men from the orchard county in the second half with Ó Sé dominating midfield while Kieran Donaghy shone at full-forward. They won by a score of 3–15 to 1–13, in the process putting paid to the notion that Kerry had no answer to the northern style of defensive play. Kerry again beat Cork in the subsequent semi-final before lining out against Mayo in the All-Ireland final. An unbelievable opening first-half saw Kerry go 2–4 to no score ahead after just ten minutes, courtesy of goals by Declan O'Sullivan and Kieran Donaghy goals. Colm Cooper slotted a third Kerry goal; however, Mayo settled and reduced the deficit to 3–8 to 3–2 at half-time. The second thirty-five minutes saw Kerry run riot while the westerners could only muster three points. A final score of 4–15 to 3–5 gave Kerry another All-Ireland title and gave Ó Sé another All-Ireland winners' medal. Ó Sé finished off the year with a second All-Star award.

In 2007 Ó Sé had a fine National League campaign which carried on into the Munster Championship. That year Kerry faced Cork in the provincial decider once again. A close game developed; however, at the full-time whistle Kerry were the champions by 1–15 to 1–13. It was Ó Sé's ninth Munster winners' medal. Kerry then had the narrowest of victories in their All-Ireland quarter-final against Monaghan, setting up a glamour All-Ireland semi-final tie with Dublin. Ó Sé spent much of the game on the bench after picking up a hip injury, however, he was introduced as a substitute to help Kerry see off a Dublin comeback and win by two points. The subsequent All-Ireland final was an historic occasion as Kerry faced Cork in the very first all-Munster championship decider. While the first half was played on an even keel, 'the Kingdom' ran riot in the second half and a rout ensued. Cork goalkeeper Alan Quirke came in for much criticism after conceding some easy goals. At the full-time whistle Cork were trounced by 3–13 to 1–9. It was a fifth All-Ireland medal for Ó Sé, his fourth on the field of play. A third All Star award quickly followed.

In 2008 there was speculation that Ó Sé, at the age of thirty-three, would retire from inter-county football. In the end he decided to line out with Kerry once again and help his team in their pursuit of a third All-Ireland title in-a-row. All did not go to plan as Ó Sé's side lost team captain Paul Galvin to suspension after an incident with referee Paddy Russell in the Munster semi-final against Clare. The subsequent Munster final saw Kerry take an eight-point lead over Cork at half-time. 'The Rebels' fought back and, in a massive downpour, Kerry could only muster three points in the second period of play as Cork secured a remarkable 1–16 to 1–11 victory. Furthermore, Ó Sé picked up a red card after an altercation with Pearse O'Neill. Kerry worked their way through to the All-Ireland semi-final where they faced Cork once again. 'The Kingdom' were much better in this encounter; however, Ó Sé received a straight red card for an incident with Pearse O'Neill once again. At this stage of the game Kerry were cruising and it looked as if Ó Sé would miss the All-Ireland final. Two very late goals by Cork secured a draw. The replay was also an exciting affair; however, Kerry overcame Cork in their third championship meeting that year. An All-Ireland final appearance against Tyrone was the reward for this victory, with Ó Sé lining out at midfield again. An exciting game developed, one that was more competitive than the routs that had taken place at the same stage of the championship over the previous two years. The sides were level seven times before Colm Cooper nudged Kerry 0–8 to 0–7 ahead before the interval. Tyrone simply wore Kerry into the ground in the second half as a priceless goal from Tommy McGuigan and a string of late points inspired Tyrone to their third All-Ireland title of the decade.

While many thought that the All-Ireland defeat would finally signal the end of Ó Sé's long career, he rejoined the panel again in 2009. He came on as a substitute in Kerry's National League victory over Derry to capture his third winners' medal in that competition. Kerry's next game was a Munster semi-final meeting with Cork. That game ended in a draw, however, Kerry were well beaten in the replay. 'The Kingdom' were subsequently banished to the qualifiers where they had some unimpressive wins over Longford, Sligo and Antrim. Ó Sé and his squad later lined out in the All-Ireland quarter-final and thrashed Dublin before overcoming Meath in a disappointing semi-final. The subsequent All-Ireland final saw Kerry face Cork for the third time in that year's championship. Ó Sé's side entered the game as slight underdogs, however, they had the trump card of having never lost a game to Cork at Croke Park. Kerry stuttered in the opening period and trailed by 0–1 to 1–3 early in the first-half. The Kerry team stuck to their gameplan while Cork recorded fourteen wides. At the full-time whistle Kerry were the champions again by 0–16 to 1–9. It was Ó Sé's sixth All-Ireland winners' medal, his fifth on the field of play. His contribution to the championship was later recognised when he picked up a fourth All-Star award.

A period of considerable speculation as to Ó Sé's future intentions ended in February 2010 when he announced his retirement from inter-county football in an interview in Irish with former teammate Dara Ó Cinnéide on the An Saol ó Dheas programme on RTÉ Raidió na Gaeltachta. He said that he had been considering the matter since Christmas but only came to a final decision at the beginning of February. Ó Sé added that he would continue to play with his club An Ghaeltacht and his divisional side Ciarraí Thiar.

=== Inter-provincial ===
Ó Sé also lined out with Munster in the inter-provincial championship and enjoyed some success. He first played with his province in 1996 as Munster defeated Ulster to set up a final date with Leinster. The men from the eastern province ran away with the victory in the end and defeated Ó Sé's side by 1–13 to 0–9.

After a few disappointing seasons where Ó Sé failed to be picked or faced defeat, Munster were back in the final again in 1999. Connacht were the opponents on this occasion; however, the men from the south made no mistake on this occasion. A 0–10 to 0–7 victory gave Ó Sé a Railway Cup winners' medal.

In 2007, at a time when most players would be contemplating retirement, Ó Sé was brought back to the Munster squad for the final time. The campaign was an ultimately disappointing one as Munster were defeated by Ulster in the Railway Cup final.

=== International Rules ===
Ó Sé was chosen for duty with Ireland in the International Rules Series against Australia. He first lined out for his country in the first test in 2001. Ireland won that game and later went on to win the second test by a considerable margin. An aggregate score of 130–105 gave Ireland the series victory and gave Ó Sé an International Rules winners' medal.

Ó Sé was chosen for International Rules duty again the following year. Australia, however, narrowly won the first test by 65 to 58 points. The second test ended in a 42 points apiece draw. As a result of this Ireland lost by an aggregate score of 7 points.

== Politics ==
On 2 November 2012, media reported that Fianna Fáil had attempted to lure Ó Sé into their camp.

== Personal life ==
In 2021 Ó Sé was disqualified from driving for three years after he was found guilty of driving intoxicated and a urine sample found he was six times over the legal limit.

== Honours ==
=== An Ghaeltacht ===
- All-Ireland Senior Club Football Championship:
  - Winner (0):
  - Runner-up (1): 2004
- Munster Senior Club Football Championship:
  - Winner (1): 2003
- Kerry Senior Football Championship:
  - Winner (2): 2001, 2003
  - Runner-up (1): 2000
- Kerry County Club Football Championship:
  - Winner (3): 2001, 2002, 2005
  - Runner-up (3): 1999, 2000, 2003
  - Kerry Intermediate Football Championship:
  - Winner (1): 1998
  - Kerry Junior Football Championship:
  - Winner (1): 1993

=== Kerry ===
- All-Ireland Senior Football Championship:
  - Winner (6): 1997, 2000, 2004 (sub), 2006, 2007, 2009
  - Runner-up (3): 2002 (c), 2005, 2008
- Munster Senior Football Championship:
  - Winner (9): 1996, 1997, 1998, 2000, 2001, 2003, 2004, 2005, 2007
  - Runner-up (4): 1995, 1999, 2006, 2008
- National Football League (Division 1):
  - Winner (3): 1996–97, 2006, 2009
- National Football League (Division 2):
  - Winner (1): 2002 (c)
- All-Ireland Under-21 Football Championship:
  - Winner (1): 1995, 1996
- Munster Under-21 Football Championship:
  - Winner (1): 1995, 1996

=== Munster ===
- Railway Cup:
  - Winner (1): 1999
  - Runner-up (2): 1996, 2007

=== Ireland ===
- International Rules Series:
  - Winner (1): 2001
  - Runner-up (1): 2002

=== DIT ===
- Trench Cup:
  - Winner (1): 1995

Sporting positions
Preceded by Eoin Brosnan	Kerry Senior Football Captain; 2002	Succeeded by Mike McCarthy
