= Tomás Ó Sé =

Kerry Gaelic footballer (born 1978)

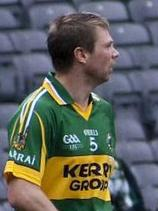

Personal information
- Native name: Tomás Ó Sé (Irish)
- Born: 21 June 1978 (age 48) Tralee, County Kerry, Ireland
- Occupation: Gaelscoil teacher
- Height: 5 ft 9 in (175 cm)

Sport
- Sport: Gaelic football
- Position: Right half back
Clubs
- Years: Club
- 1996–2013 2015–2018: An Ghaeltacht; Nemo Rangers
Club titles
- Kerry titles: 2
- Munster titles: 2
- All-Ireland Titles: 0
Inter-county
Years	County	Apps (scores)
1998–2013	Kerry	199 (3–35)
Inter-county titles
- Munster titles: 10
- All-Irelands: 5
- NFL: 3
- All Stars: 5

Tomás Ó Sé (pronounced [t̪ˠʊˈmˠaːsˠ oː ˈʃeː]; born 21 June 1978) is an Irish former Gaelic footballer. He played Gaelic football with Nemo Rangers and at senior level for the Kerry county team from 1998 until he retired in 2013, playing predominantly in the half-back line. In one of the most decorated careers in Gaelic Games, Ó Sé won 5 All-Ireland titles, 10 Munster titles and was Footballer of the Year in 2004. His brothers Darragh and Marc too played Gaelic football and represented Kerry at the All-Ireland Senior Club Football Championship.

In retirement from playing he became an analyst on The Sunday Game. He also became involved in the Offaly county football team, under the management of John Maughan.

== Playing career ==
=== Club ===
Born in Ard an Bhóthair, Ceann Trá, County Kerry, Ó Sé played his club football with his local club, An Ghaeltacht, and made his debut with the club's senior team in the mid-1990s where he soon became an ever-present fixture in the half-back line.

In 2000, An Ghaeltacht reached the final of the county senior championship for the very first time. Ó Sé's side were the red-hot favourites but their opponents Dr Crokes took charge. A hard-fought 1–4 to 0–6 score line resulted in defeat for An Ghaeltacht.

In 2001, an Ghaeltacht regrouped and reached a second consecutive county final with Tralee-based club Austin Stacks providing the opposition. Ó Sé's side were well prepared. A conclusive 1–13 to 0–10 victory gave Ó Sé his first county winners' medal.

An Ghaeltacht surrendered their club title in 2002; however, the following year Ó Sé's side were back in the county championship decider. Laune Rangers were the opponents on this occasion; however, the game ended in a 0–10 apiece draw. The replay a fortnight later was a much more conclusive affair. A 0–12 to 2–4 score line gave an Ghaeltacht the victory and gave Ó Cinnéide a second county winners' medal in three years. This victory allowed the club to represent Kerry in the provincial club championship. A successful campaign saw Ó Sé's side reach the provincial final against St Senan's of Clare. A close game developed, however, the Kerrymen held on in the end to secure a 1–8 to 1–6 victory, giving Ó Sé a Munster club winners' medal.

An Ghaeltacht continued their march in the All-Ireland series and on St. Patrick's Day 2004 played in the All-Ireland club championship final. Caltra from County Galway, provided the opposition and an exciting game developed. Dara Ó Cinnéide faced the heartbreak of missing a goal in the dying seconds as an Ghaeltacht lost out by just a single point – 0–13 to 0–12.

The following few years saw Ó Sé enjoy little success with the club after the victories of the earlier parts of the decade.

=== Junior, minor and under-21 ===
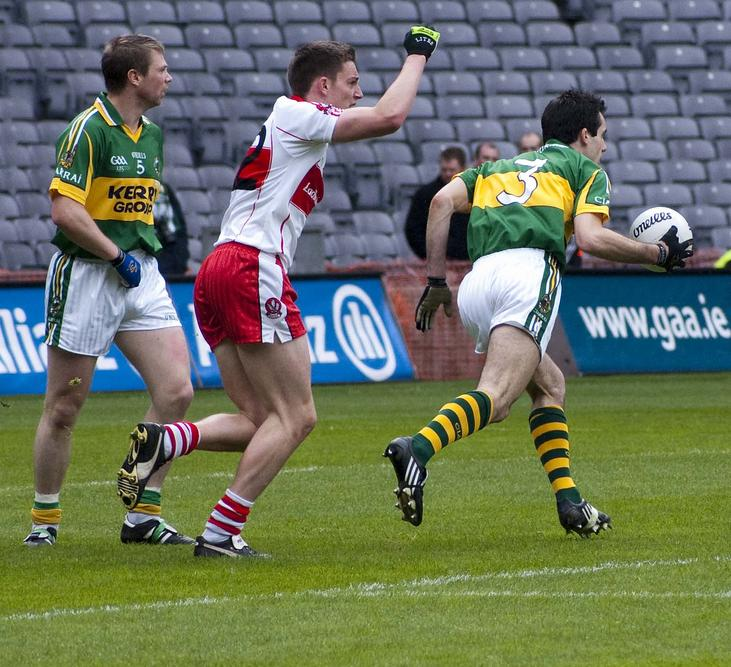
Ó Sé (left, number 5) in action against Derry in the 2009 National League final

Ó Sé first came to prominence on the inter-county scene as a member of the Kerry junior football team in 1995. That year he captured a Munster title following a thrilling 1–21 to 0–19 victory after extra-time against Cork. Kerry's championship run came to an end in the All-Ireland semi-final, when London narrowly defeated Ó Sé's side by 2–10 to 1–12.

By the mid-1990s, Ó Sé had joined the Kerry minor football team. In 1996 Kerry reached the provincial decider, with Ó Sé as centre-back. Age-old rivals Cork provided the opposition, however, a 3–9 to 2–6 gave Ó Sé a Munster title in the minor grade. A place in the All-Ireland final quickly followed with Laois lining out in opposition. A close game developed; however, Ó Sé's side narrowly lost by 2–11 to 1–11.

By 1997, Ó Sé had joined the Kerry under-21 team and began a successful three-year spell. In his first year Kerry defeated Cork after a replay to take the Munster title. Ó Sé's side were later defeated in the All-Ireland semi-final.

In 1998, Kerry retained their Munster under-21 crown after a 3–10 to 1–11 defeat of Tipperary. Ó Sé's side went one better on this occasion by reaching the All-Ireland final. Laois provided the opposition; however, Kerry won on a score line of 2–8 to 0–11. It was Ó Sé's first All-Ireland under-21 title.

Kerry won three Munster titles in-a-row in 1999 following a six-point defeat of Cork. A second consecutive All-Ireland final appearance followed, with Westmeath providing the opposition. While Kerry were the favourites, the Leinster champions went on to make history by capturing their first All-Ireland title on a score line of 0–12 to 0–9. This was Ó Sé's last game with the Kerry under-21 team.

=== Senior ===
By 1998 Ó Sé was also a member of the Kerry senior football team, making his senior debut in a Munster Championship game against Cork that year, but he played no part in Kerry's subsequent defeat of Tipperary in the Munster final. Ó Sé's side were later dumped out of the championship by a Mick O'Dwyer–managed Kildare in the All-Ireland semi-final.

In 1999, Kerry were attempting to secure a fourth provincial title in succession, while Ó Sé was hopeful of winning his first on the field of play. Cork put an end to this dream with a 2–10 to 2–4 win over their great rivals in the Munster final. With that Kerry were dumped out of the championship.

After a low point the previous year, Kerry were back in the provincial decider again in 2000, with Clare providing the opposition. In a disappointing match, Kerry heavily defeated 'the Banner men' by 3–15 to 0–8.

It was Ó Sé's first Munster medal on the field of play. Kerry had firmly established their All-Ireland contender credentials, however, the All-Ireland series proved difficult. Ó Sé's side drew with Armagh in the semi-final, while the replay proved just as tense. Again both sides finished level after seventy minutes and it took a period of extra-time to find a winner. Kerry narrowly emerged from that game as the 2–15 to 1–15 winners and to win a place in the Millennium All-Ireland final. Galway provided the opposition in what was their second championship decider appearance in three years. Both sides missed easy chances and seemed apprehensive about taking a lead. Galway trailed by seven points at one stage, but clawed their way back to secure a 0–14 apiece draw. The replay was a much more conclusive affair. Galway worked the ball the length of the field to Declan Meehan who scored a goal to give the westerners a boost. A disputed free with seventeen minutes left in the game gave Kerry a lead which they would not relinquish. At the full-time whistle Kerry were the champions by 0–17 to 1–10. It was Ó Sé's first All-Ireland winners' medal.

Kerry swept through the provincial series again in 2001. A 0–19 to 1–13 defeat of Cork gave Ó Sé a second Munster winners' medal and gave Kerry a boost in their All-Ireland ambitions. In a new innovation called the All-Ireland qualifiers series, Kerry's provincial victory allowed them to advance to the All-Ireland quarter-final. An exciting draw and a replay with Dublin at Semple Stadium gave Ó Sé's side the right to advance to an All-Ireland semi-final showdown with Meath. There was some controversy leading up to the game with new squad member Eoin Brosnan getting the captaincy before the game, despite not yet having established himself as a regular. There was also great debate about the refusal to start the legendary Maurice Fitzgerald, particularly after his performance in the Dublin game. In one of the lowest points ever for Kerry football, Ó Sé's side were absolutely demolished by a score of 2–14 to 0–5.

In 2002, Kerry faced more controversy. The team were forced to play a replay of their Munster semi-final against Cork only a few days after the funeral of the brother of team manager Páidí Ó Sé and father of Tomás, Darragh and Marc Ó Sé. Cork took full advantage and Kerry embarked on a qualifier campaign which saw them account for Wicklow, Fermanagh and Kildare before they trounced reigning champions Galway in the All-Ireland quarter-final before stuffing archrivals Cork in a unique all-Munster All-Ireland semi-final. The subsequent All-Ireland decider pitted Kerry against Armagh in one of the great finals. The first-half saw everything going Kerry's way while Armagh floundered. The Ulster men lost John McEntee to concussion while Oisín McConville missed a penalty just before the interval. As it stood Armagh trailed by four points at half-time while Darragh Ó Sé gave an inspirational performance. A different Armagh team emerged in the second-half. McConville compensated for his earlier miss by scoring a key goal in the 55th minute. Kerry froze after this and failed to score for the rest of the match as Armagh went on to narrowly win their first All-Ireland by 1–12 to 0–14.

Kerry regrouped after this blow and reached the provincial decider once again in 2003. Limerick provided the opposition; however, they were no match for 'the Kingdom'. A 1–11 to 0–9 victory gave Ó Sé a third Munster winners' medal. After an exciting game with Roscommon, Kerry advanced to an All-Ireland semi-final meeting with Tyrone. After being shocked in the latter stages of the two previous championships, Kerry were favourites going into the match. The whole team struggled, however, and Kerry looked like they were going to be left behind with the new "blanket defence" that was introduced by teams like Armagh and perfected by Tyrone. Many criticised this tactic as a means of stopping talented footballers like Ó Sé and Colm Cooper from playing but few could deny its effectiveness. A 0–13 to 0–6 defeat saw Tyrone advance to the All-Ireland final while Kerry were unceremoniously dumped out of the championship.

2004 saw Jack O'Connor take over as manager of the Kerry team. Ó Sé's side reached the final of the National League and in an exciting 3–11 to 1–6 victory Kerry claimed the title and Ó Sé picked up a first National League winners' medal. Kerry later booked their almost annual spot in the provincial final and, for the second year in succession, Limerick were the opponents. Surprisingly, that game ended in a 1–10 apiece draw. The replay was also a close-run affair; however, Kerry never really looked in danger of losing. A 3–10 to 2–9 victory gave Ó Sé a fourth Munster winners' medal. The All-Ireland series proved no difficulty for Kerry, and 'the Kingdom' booked their place in the All-Ireland final against Mayo. An early goal from Alan Dillon gave the Connacht men some hope, however, the game was effectively over after twenty-five minutes when Colm Cooper scored Kerry's only goal of the day. The points kept coming from Ó Sé's team and an injury-time Michael Conroy goal was nothing but a consolation for Mayo. A 1–20 to 2–9 victory gave Ó Sé a second All-Ireland winners' medal. He ended the year by collecting his first All-Star award.

In 2005, Kerry were favourites to retain their All-Ireland title. All was going to plan as Ó Sé's side reached yet another provincial final. In a return to tradition, Cork were the opponents. A close game developed, however, in the end Kerry were the narrow winners by 1–11 to 0–11. It was Ó Sé's eighth Munster winners' medal. Following this win Kerry cruised through the All-Ireland series to reach another championship decider with Tyrone providing the opposition. In one of the great finals of the decade, the result remained in doubt until the final whistle. Dara Ó Cinnéide powered the team ahead with a goal after just six minutes. Ó Sé launched the Kerry comeback in the 57th minute with Kerry's second goal; however, it was too late. Tyrone hung on to win by 1–16 to 2–10. It was Ó Sé's second defeat in an All-Ireland final. There was some consolation when Ó Sé picked up a second All-Star award at the end of the year.

In 2006, Kerry reached the final of the National League and played Galway. Ó Sé's side could only manage three points in the opening half, however, the introduction of Eoin Brosnan transformed the team. At the end of the seventy minutes, a 2–12 to 0–10 score line gave Kerry their 18th National League title. The league win was a false dawn as Kerry went out tamely to Cork in a replay of the Munster final. The team, however, bounced back against Longford to set up a meeting with Armagh in the All-Ireland quarter-final. At half-time it looked as though the Ulser hoodoo would strike again but Kerry blitzed the men from the orchard county in the second half with Ó Sé dominating midfield while Kieran Donaghy shone at full-forward. They won by a score of 3–15 to 1–13, in the process putting an end to the notion that Kerry had no answer to the northern style of defensive play. Kerry again beat Cork in the subsequent semi-final before lining out against Mayo in the All-Ireland final. An unbelievable opening first-half saw Kerry go 2–4 to no score ahead after just ten minutes, courtesy of goals by Declan O'Sullivan and Kieran Donaghy. Colm Cooper slotted a third Kerry goal, however, Mayo settled and reduced the deficit to 3–8 to 3–2 at half-time. The second thirty-five minutes saw Kerry run riot while the westerners could only muster three points. A final score of 4–15 to 3–5 gave Kerry another All-Ireland title and gave Ó Sé his third All-Ireland winners' medal.

In 2007, Ó Sé had a fine National League campaign which carried on into the Munster championship. That year Kerry faced Cork in the provincial decider once again. A close game developed, however, at the full-time whistle Kerry were the champions by 1–15 to 1–13. It was Ó Sé's sixth Munster winners' medal. Kerry then had the narrowest of victories in their All-Ireland quarter-final against Monaghan, before defeating Dublin in a glamour All-Ireland semi-final. The subsequent All-Ireland final was an historic occasion as Kerry faced Cork in the very first all-Munster championship decider. While the first half was played on an even keel, 'the Kingdom' ran riot in the second half and a rout ensued. Cork goalkeeper Alan Quirke came in for much criticism after conceding some easy goals. At the full-time whistle Cork were trounced by 3–13 to 1–9. It was a fourth All-Ireland medal for Ó Sé. A third All-Star award quickly followed.

2008 began in controversial circumstances as Ó Sé's side lost team captain Paul Galvin to suspension after an incident with referee Paddy Russell in the Munster semi-final against Clare. The subsequent Munster final saw Kerry take an eight-point lead over Cork at half-time. 'The Rebels' fought back and, in a massive downpour, Kerry could only muster three points in the second period of play as Cork secured a remarkable 1–16 to 1–11 victory. Kerry worked their way through the qualifiers to an All-Ireland final appearance against Tyrone. An exciting game developed, one that was more competitive than the routs that had taken place at the same stage of the championship over the previous two years. The sides were level seven times before Colm Cooper nudged Kerry 0–8 to 0–7 ahead before the interval. Tyrone wore Kerry into the ground in the second half as a priceless goal from Tommy McGuigan and a string of late points inspired Tyrone to their third All-Ireland title of the decade. In spite of the defeat Ó Sé picked up a fourth All-Star.

In 2009, Ó Sé picked up his third National League winners' medal following a defeat of Derry. Kerry's next game was a Munster semi-final meeting with Cork. That game ended in a draw, however, Kerry were well beaten in the replay. 'The Kingdom' were subsequently banished to the qualifiers where they had some unimpressive wins over Longford, Sligo and Antrim. Ó Sé and his squad later lined out in the All-Ireland quarter-final and thrashed Dublin before overcoming Meath in a disappointing semi-final. The subsequent All-Ireland final saw Kerry face Cork for the third time in that year's championship. Ó Sé's side entered the game as slight underdogs, however, they had the trump card of having never lost a game to Cork at Croke Park. Kerry stuttered in the opening period and trailed by 0–1 to 1–3 early in the first-half. The Kerry team stuck to their gameplan while Cork recorded fourteen wides. At the full-time whistle Kerry were the champions again by 0–16 to 1–9. It was Ó Sé's sixth All-Ireland winners' medal, his fifth on the field of play. His contribution to the championship was later recognised when he picked up a fifth All-Star award while also being named Texaco Footballer of the Year.

In 2010, Ó Sé bowed out of the championship in disgrace. Having started the championship brightly, beating Cork in the Munster championship semi-final, Kerry met Limerick in the final. Limerick led early on but Kerry rallied in the later stages and secured the win. In the aftermath of the game, video footage of the game exposed Ó Sé as having made numerous attempts to elbow Limerick star forward Stephen Kelly in the head. Ó Sé's actions were carried out under the radar of the referee in charge and therefore went unpunished. However, the CCCC handed him a ban a week later which saw him on the side lines until Kerry were eventually knocked out of the championship by Down.

In 2011, Ó Sé's first championship match was against Tipperary in the Munster senior football championship quarter final. The game contained a number of talking points, but the main one occurred when Ó Sé was involved in an off-the-ball incident with Hugh Coghlan from Tipperary in front of the stand in the 33rd minute. The linesman witnessed Ó Sé strike Coghlan, leaving match official Maurice Condon with no option but to red-card Ó Sé. Since this was the second such offence for Ó Sé in the space of a year – though his first offence against Limerick's Stephen Kelly's was dealt with post-match in 2010 – the mandatory ban was doubled up to two months, which again saw him sit out the remainder of the Munster championship.

2012 began in a similar fashion for Ó Sé. Kerry's first outing in the national league was against Tipperary. Having become involved in an off-the-ball incident with Tipperary wing-forward Hugh Coughlan, the referee was alerted to Ó Sé's indiscretion by the linesman, with the straight red card that followed meaning that the defender was again suspended.

Ó Sé returned to the fray in Kerry's league tie with Laois. He played for approximately 10 minutes before being sent off again, having become involved in an off-the-ball incident. The referee brandished the red for a 'striking' offence. Due to this being a third such infraction inside 10 months, the mandatory ban was again doubled – meaning that Tomás was forced to sit out the remainder of the national league.

In 2013, Kerry started the league slowly, with losses at the hands of Mayo, Dublin, Kildare and champions Donegal. Relegation was looming. During the game against Donegal, Ó Sé was red-carded for an off-the-ball incident with Ryan McHugh. This was Ó Sé's fifth red card between 2010 and 2013; all five involved 'off the ball' incidents. He sat out the next game against Down, which Kerry won and registered their first win of the league campaign.

=== Retirement ===
In October 2013, Ó Sé announced his retirement from inter-county football. Éamonn Fitzmaurice, who was managing Kerry at the time, paid tribute to him, saying he was "the best wing back that I have seen play the game. In many ways Tomás epitomised everything that Kerry football is all about. His commitment, determination and never-say-die attitude were plainly visible every time he took to the pitch."

At the time of his retirement he was the longest-serving inter-county footballer, and is well known because of his dedication to his career in football .

== Media career ==
Ó Sé joined RTÉ's The Sunday Game and quickly established himself as a regular analyst.

Ó Sé was working for RTÉ on their television coverage of the 2019 All-Ireland Senior Football Championship semi-final between Dublin and Mayo at Croke Park on Saturday 10 August. Tomás went to the toilet at the start of the second half. Mayo had a half-time lead of two points. By the time Tomás had returned to the RTÉ studio, Dublin had scored 1–2 on their way to defeating Mayo and confirming their place in a fifth successive All-Ireland SFC final. Tomás's trip to the toilet was remarked upon during the post-match analysis as an example of how quickly Dublin had turned the match in their favour. While Tomás was on (or possibly over) the toilet (he declined to reveal the exact manner in which he had relieved himself), Con O'Callaghan scored the first of his two goals in the game, following a Dean Rock point from a free. A point from Niall Scully completed the 1–2 missed by while Tomás was on or over the toilet. Joe Brolly, writing in the following day's Sunday Independent, referred to Ó Sé's "mistake" that coincided with Mayo's "melting down". On The Sunday Game highlights programme on the night after the match, Tomás's trip to the toilet was again discussed and dissected as part of the semi-final games analysis. However, no further details were revealed.

Ó Sé also writes for the Irish Independent.

== Managerial career ==
He coached the Glanmire minor footballers to a county title. In 2021, he worked with the John Maughan–managed Offaly senior football team and was linked with that job when Maughan left.

On 23 August 2022, Ó Sé was named as manager of the Kerry under-20 football team.

== Personal life ==
Ó Sé lives in Glanmire, County Cork, and he works as a teacher in Fermoy, a career he chose to accommodate his football.

== Honours ==
- Munster Senior Football Championship (9) 2000, 2001, 2003, 2004, 2005, 2007, 2010, 2011, 2013
- All-Ireland Senior Football Championship (5) 2000, 2004, 2006 2007, 2009
- National Football League Division 1 (3) 2004, 2006, 2009
- All-Ireland Under 21 Football Championship (1) 1998
- Munster Under-21 Football Championship (3) 1997, 1998, 1999
- Munster Minor Football Championship (1) 1996
- Munster Senior Club Football Championship (1) 2003, 2017
- Kerry Senior Football Championship (2) 2001, 2003
- Cork Senior Football Championship (1): 2015, 2017
- All Stars Awards (5) 2004, 2005, 2007, 2008, 2009
- Texaco Footballer of the Year (1) 2009
- In May 2020, a public poll conducted by RTÉ.ie named Ó Sé in the half-back line alongside Lee Keegan and Jack McCaffrey in a team of footballers who had won All Stars during the era of The Sunday Game.
- Also in May 2020, the Irish Independent named O Sé at number twenty in its "Top 20 footballers in Ireland over the past 50 years".

Sporting positions
Preceded by Paul Galvin	Kerry Senior Football Captain; 2008	Succeeded by Paul Galvin
Awards
Preceded by Seán Cavanagh (Tyrone)	Texaco Footballer of the Year; 2009	Succeeded by Bernard Brogan Jnr (Dublin)
