= 1902 Ulster Senior Football Championship =

Gaelic football tournament

1902 Ulster SFC
Tournament details
- Province: Ulster
- Year: 1902
- Date: January - April 1904
- Teams: 4
- Defending champions: Antrim

Winners
- Champions: Armagh (2nd win)

Runners-up
- Runners-up: Antrim

Other
- Matches played: 4
- Total scored: 5-24
- Website: Ulster GAA

The 1902 Ulster Senior Football Championship was the fifth staging of Ulster GAA's premier inter-county Gaelic football competition, and part of the 1902 All-Ireland Senior Football Championship.

The defending champions were Antrim. The competition was won by Armagh who won their second provincial title.

Despite being the 1902 edition, all games were played in 1904.

== Teams ==
Four counties entered the competition:

- Antrim
- Armagh
- Cavan
- Tyrone

== Semi-Finals ==
Armagh and Tyrone met in the semi-final at Abbey Park in Armagh. With Armagh leading by 0–3 to 0-2, the referee abandoned the game with two minutes left to play owing to spectators encroaching onto the pitch. The refixed game was played on 30 January 1904 at Emmett Park, Dungannon, with Armagh winning the tie by 1–6 to 0-3.

On the other side of the draw, Antrim hosted Cavan at Seaghan an Diomáis Park on 7 February 1904, Antrim progressing with a 1–3 to 0–1 win.

== Final ==
The final was played on 3 April 1904, which was Easter Sunday, at Seaghan an Diomáis Park in Belfast. The ground was reported as being in a poor state. Armagh played in white, whilst Antrim appeared in their now familiar saffron kit. At half time, Antrim led 1–2 to 0-1, however Armagh staged a second-half comeback and won the tie 2–2 to 1-4.

== 1902 Ulster Senior Football Championship ==
3 January 1904
Semi-Final

Armagh	0-3 – 0-2 abandoned	Tyrone

Abbey Park, Armagh

31 January 1904
Semi-Final Replay

Armagh	1-6 – 0-3	Tyrone

Emmett Park, Dungannon

7 February 1904
Semi-Final

Antrim	1-3 – 0-1	Cavan

Seaghan an Diomáis Park, Belfast

3 April 1904
Final

Armagh	2-2 – 1-4	Antrim

Seaghan an Diomáis Park, Belfast
