= 1890 Ulster Senior Football Championship =

Gaelic football tournament

1890 Ulster SFC
Tournament details
- Province: Ulster
- Year: 1890
- Teams: 3
- Defending champions: Monaghan (did not enter)

Winners
- Champions: Armagh (1st win)

Runners-up
- Runners-up: Tyrone

Other
- Website: Ulster GAA

The 1890 Ulster Senior Football Championship was the second staging of that competition and was contested by three counties; Armagh, Antrim and Tyrone.

Tyrone (represented by Owen Roe O'Neill's Cookstown) received a bye into the final, whilst Antrim (represented by Armagh Harps) and Antrim (represented by Belfast) competed in a semi-final.

The defending champions, Monaghan, did not enter. Armagh won the competition, claiming their first Ulster Championship.

== Championship ==
17 August 1890
Semi-final

Armagh	3-7 - 0-1	Antrim

Armagh
Referee: James Weldon

12 October 1890
Final

Armagh	2-8 - 1-2	Tyrone

Blaris, Lisburn
