= Gabriel Bradley =

Derry Gaelic footballer

Personal information
- Native name: Gabriel Ó Brolcháin (Irish)

Sport
- Sport: Gaelic football
- Position: Back / midfield / forward
Club
- Years: Club
- 19xx–1989: Glenullin
Club titles
- Derry titles: 1
Inter-county**
Years	County	Apps (scores)
1975–1984	Derry	22
Inter-county titles
- Ulster titles: 2
- **Inter County team apps and scores correct as of 11:33, 14 April 2009 (UTC); Championship games only.

Gabriel Bradley is a former Gaelic footballer from Glenullin, County Londonderry, Northern Ireland. Bradley played for the Derry county team in the 1970s and 1980s. He won two Ulster Senior Football Championships with the county. Bradley played club football for John Mitchel's Glenullin and won the Derry Senior Football Championship with the club.

He was a versatile player who could play in defense, midfield or in the half forward line.

== Background ==
Bradley comes from a Glenullin family with a strong footballing background. Two of his uncles, James and Paddy Rafferty had played for Derry. Gabriel played alongside his first cousin Eunan Rafferty (son of Paddy) during the 1980s Bradley went to school at St Columb's College in Derry City. St Columb's at the time was the county's top football nursery and here he played under coaches such as Father Ignatius McQuillan and Raymond Gallagher.

When Bradley won the Derry Championship with Glenullin in 1985, five of his brothers were also on the team. His cousin Colm Rafferty won the All-Ireland Senior Football Championship with Derry in 1993. Bradley's brother Liam currently manages Antrim and his sons (Gabriel's nephews) Paddy and Eoin are important players on the current Derry team. When Glenullin won the Derry Championship in 2007, nearly half the team were related to Gabriel Bradley.

== Playing career ==
=== Inter-county ===
Bradley played for the Derry Minor and Under 21 before progressing to the Senior side. He made his Senior inter-county debut against Armagh in 1975. That year Derry won the Ulster Senior Football Championship beating Down in the final, with Bradley playing at left corner back. Derry were beaten by Dublin in the subsequent All-Ireland semi-final.

Derry reached the 1976 National Football League final, but were defeated by Dublin by a point, where Bradley was left half forward. Derry also retained their Ulster Championship title that year. They were defeated by Kerry in the All-Ireland semi-final. Derry reached their third Ulster final in a row in 1977, but were beaten by Armagh. Bradley made his last appearance for Derry in 1984, against Tyrone.

=== Club ===
Bradley won a Derry Intermediate Championship medal with Glenullin in 1977. Eight years later he was an important part of the side that won the 1985 Derry Senior Football Championship - the club's first Derry Championship in 57 years. Glenullin named Bradley Player of the Year in 1986, and he was named Clubman of the Year in 1988.

In 1989 while travelling to the All-Ireland Hurling Championship final, he was involved in a serious road accident that ended his 17-year-long club career. Despite having a severely damaged leg, he went back to drag his two friends from a burning car.

Bradley was also chairman of the Glenullin club in the late 1980s.
