= 2004 Tommy Murphy Cup =

The first Tommy Murphy Cup, a Gaelic football tournament, was held in 2004. All those teams that lost in the early rounds of the championship were invited to play, but only four actually competed. Clare were the inaugural champions, Ordan O'Dwyer scoring the crucial goal in the final.

== Format ==
- The 2004 Tommy Murphy was straight knockout

== Teams ==
=== General information ===
Five counties will compete in the Tommy Murphy Cup:

County	Last Cup title	Last Provincial Title	Last All-Ireland Title	Position in 2003 Championship	Appearance
Antrim	—	1951	—		1st
Clare	—	1992	—		1st
London	—	—	—		1st
Louth	—	1957	1957		1st
Sligo	—	1975	—		1st

=== Personnel and kits ===
County	Manager	Captain(s)	Sponsor
Antrim			
Clare			
London			
Louth			
Sligo			

== Bracket ==
Quarter-Finals
Clare	w/o
London	scr

Semi-Finals
Clare	2-11
Louth	0-08
Antrim	1-10
Sligo	1-11 aet

Final
Clare	1-11
Sligo	0-11

== Quarter-finals ==
=== Matches ===
Quarter-Final

Clare	w/o - scr	London

== Semi-finals ==
August 7
Semi-Final

Clare	2-11 - 0-8	Louth

Referee: T. Quigley

August 7
Semi-Final

Antrim	1-10 - 1-11 (aet)	Sligo

Dungannon

== Final ==
August 22
Final

Clare	1-11 - 0-11	Sligo

Croke Park, Dublin

== Statistics ==
=== Scoring events ===
- Widest winning margin: 9 points
  - Clare 2-11 - 0-08 Louth (Semi-finals)
- Most goals in a match: 2
  - Clare 2-11 - 0-08 Louth (Semi-finals)
  - Antrim 1-10 - 1-11 Sligo (Semi-finals)
- Most points in a match: 35
  - Clare 1-11 - 0-11 Sligo (Final)
- Most goals by one team in a match: 2
  - Clare 2-11 - 0-08 Louth (Semi-finals)
- Most points by one team in a match: 11
  - Clare 2-11 - 0-08 Louth (Semi-finals)
  - Antrim 1-10 - 1-11 Sligo (Semi-finals)
  - Clare 1-11 - 0-11 Sligo (Final)
- Highest aggregate score: 27 points
  - Antrim 1-10 - 1-11 Sligo (Semi-finals)
- Lowest aggregate score: 25 points
  - Clare 2-11 - 0-08 Louth (Semi-finals)
  - Clare 1-11 - 0-11 Sligo (Final)

== Miscellaneous ==
- Clare win their 1st championship in 12 years, last winning the 1992 Munster Senior Football Championship.

== See also ==
- 2004 All-Ireland Senior Football Championship
