= Glenullin =

Village in County Londonderry, Northern Ireland

Coordinates: 54.956°N 6.736°W

Glenullin: Irish: Gleann an Iolar
- Location within Northern Ireland
  - Belfast: 50 miles
- District: Coleraine Borough
- County: County Londonderry
- Country: Northern Ireland
- Sovereign state: United Kingdom
- Post town: Coleraine
- Postcode district: BT51
- Dialling code: 028, +44 28
- Police: Northern Ireland
- Fire: Northern Ireland
- Ambulance: Northern Ireland
- UK Parliament: East Londonderry
- NI Assembly: East Londonderry

Glenullin was previously a rural area but has now expanded to become a small village in a valley between the villages of Garvagh, Swatragh and Dungiven, and lies in the borough of Coleraine, County Londonderry, Northern Ireland. The nearest city is Derry which is 27 miles away. 'The Glen', as it is often known, is not an officially recognised administrative division but there is a strong local identity and an active community sector. Although the area has few amenities, the local Primary school, St Patrick's & St Joseph's Federated Primary School, and St Joseph's Catholic Church have particular prominence in the life of Glenullin.

== Sport ==
Glenullin was one of the first areas in the county to organise Gaelic games and the local club, John Mitchel's GAC, based at Seán Ó Maoláin Park, has a number of football and camogie teams. They previously had hurling teams but were unable to manage them correctly and they fell apart.

== People ==
- Paddy Bradley, Gaelic football player. Played for Derry from the 1990s until 2010.
- Gabriel Bradley, Gaelic footballer, played for the county in the 1970s and 1980s.
- Liam 'Baker' Bradley, manager of Antrim GAA football team.
- Eoin Bradley, Gaelic football player, a star of the county team from 2008 until an injury in 2011.
- Dermot McNicholl, one of the leading Gaelic footballers in the county in the 1980s and 1990s, also played Australian rules football and in the International Rules Series.
- Harry Mullan, boxing journalist (1946–99).
- John Eddie Mullan (1923-2008), later a Derry player, briefly played football for Glenullin in the 1940s.
- Gerard O'Kane, Gaelic football player, on county teams since 2002.

== Ecology, History and Notable places ==
In the basin of the valley there is an ombrotrophic raised bog which, having suffered severe ecological damage by commercial peat extraction in 1994, is now a protected site. Much of Glenullin bog that remains today would have been familiar to the different cultures that have populated the valley, including the pre-Christian Iron Age and the people of the Middle Ages who built forts, raths and ritual cairns on prominent locations on hillsides and drumlins. Over recent centuries, the inhabitants of the single-storey, thatched vernacular dwellings that dotted the valley sides harvested turf from the bog, revealing the stumps of the oaks that once filled the valley. In 1922 an IRA volunteer was buried in the bog. The burial was done at night with a full colour party which indicates it was a respected volunteer. There are no details of his name or burial location but the story has been passed down through generations of the MacNiocaill family (Phaidi Hamish).

The original football pitch in Glenullin was Tinkers Park in Coolcoscreghan townland, on the junction of the Lisnascreghog and Glen roads. This field is now livestock grazing. The original GAC meeting hall is a green metal building with a red roof on the Glenullin Road at the junction with Lisnascreghog Road. The current football pitch beside the council sink estate in Curraghmore was opened in 1973. A new GAC training ground was opened in 2014 in a field beside the Brockagh River, opposite the current pitch.

In older times, the Ancient Order of Hibernians played prominence in life in Glenullin. Their old meeting hall can be found in the area known as The Cutting near Brockagh Houses on the Glen Road.

There is an old church in Glenullin which can be found on Temple Road, at the Junction with Hillside Road. Although the building is now ruins, the surrounding area was tidied up to allow people to enter the old church grounds and pray.

On the junction of Churchtown Road and Ballyrogan Road, Errigal Old Church can be found. This was founded by St Adamnan in the 7th century. The site now consists of the ruined remains of a medieval church in the centre of a walled graveyard, a rock-souterrain and a ballaun stone. The unusual Gortnamoyagh Inauguration Stone, featuring two carved footprints and a staff mark, was used until the 16th century during local Gaelic Chieftain Inauguration ceremonies.

== Parish ==
Glenullin is in the civil parish of Errigal and in the Catholic parish of Garvagh in the (Diocese of Derry). Glenullin covers about half the total parish area, the remaining being in the village of Garvagh and the neighbouring hamlet of Ballerin.
