= Liam Bradley (Gaelic footballer) =

Gaelic football manager and former player

Personal information
- Nickname: Baker

Sport
- Sport: Gaelic football
Club management
- Years: Club
- Late 1980s & 2005–2007 2002–2004 2008–2009 2014–2015: Glenullin; Claudy; Banagher; Malin
	1	–	–
Inter-county management
- Years: Team
- ?–? 2009–2011: Derry Under 21s Antrim

Liam Bradley, commonly known by his nickname Baker, is a Gaelic football manager and former player for Glenullin and the Derry county team. He twice managed the senior Antrim county team between October 2008 and August 2012 and from November 2013 until 2014.

== Personal life ==
Bradley comes from a family with a strong footballing background. Two of his uncles, James and Paddy Rafferty had played for Derry. When Bradley won the Derry Championship with Glenullin in 1985, five of his brothers were also on the team. His brother Gabriel won two Ulster Championship medals with Derry in 1975 and 1976. His cousin Colm Rafferty won the All-Ireland Senior Football Championship with Derry in 1993.

He is father of Derry players Paddy and Eoin Bradley. He is also an uncle to Glenullin and Derry player Gerard O'Kane.

== Playing career ==
Liam Bradley
Sport
- Sport: Gaelic football
- Position: –
Clubs
- Years: Club
- ?–? ?–?: Kilrea (underage); Glenullin
Club titles
- Derry titles: 1
Inter-county
- Years: County
- Derry

=== Inter-county ===
Bradley represented Derry at minor, under-21 and senior levels. Frankie O'Loan and Harry Shivers drafted him into the senior panel. However, he was not part of Mickey Moran's plans when he became manager – Bradley held no grudge, saying "That is just the way it goes". His senior career was mainly limited to a few Dr McKenna Cup games. He later recalled: "I never really cut it at senior with Derry as in the early '80s I was just down the pecking order a bit".

=== Club ===
When Bradley was growing up, his home-club Glenullin, did not have any underage teams at the time due to a lack of population in the area. He instead played for neighbouring club Pádraig Pearse's GAC Kilrea. His team-mates on the Kilrea team included a young Martin O'Neill, who would go on to play and coach professional soccer. He played in an under-16 final against Glack in 1974.

He, however, played for Glenullin at senior level and experienced a long career with them. He won the Derry Senior Football Championship with the club in 1985. He retired from playing in 1996 at the age of 36, he even played in the Reserve Championship semi-final against Dungiven that year alongside his son Paddy.

=== School ===
Bradley played full back when St Pat's, Maghera won the 1977 MacRory Cup final against Abbey C.B.S., Newry. It was the first time the school had won the competition – the most important in Ulster Colleges football.

== Early managerial influences ==
When playing underage football for Kilrea, he played under Father Leo Deery, the parish priest of Kilrea at the time. He described him as "a great GAA man" and one of the first people to introduce him to Gaelic football.

Bradley also hails Ballinderry's Adrian McGuckin as an inspirational influence, who taught him most of what he knows about coaching football. McGuckin was manager when Bradley won a MacRory Cup playing with St. Pat's in 1977. He says "Adrian was a brilliant man. He was probably the greatest coach I ever played under, or the greatest coach I've ever seen". He continued "Adrian installed a will to win with us that was unbelievable".

== Club management ==
By the early 1980s, despite only being in his early 20s, Bradley was part of Glenullin's underage management team with Danny McIlvar and Gerard O'Kane. He says "That's when I started coaching and it's just progressed from there." His first stint as Senior manager of Glenullin came in the late 1980s, when both he and Gerard O'Kane were player-managers. He coached St Matthew's GAC Drumsurn when Richard Ferris was manager. and has also been manager of John Mitchel's GAC Claudy between 2002 and 2004. Bradley took over as manager of home-club Glenullin in 2005, and guided them to success in the 2007 Derry Championship, where they beat Bellaghy in the final after a replay. It was Glenullin's first victorious Championship since 1985. He also led them to victory in the Ulster Club Football League earlier that year. He was manager of Banagher in 2008.

== Inter-county management ==
=== Derry roles ===
When Richard Ferris was manager of the Derry minor team, he brought Bradley in as coach / joint manager. And along with Ferris he has managed Derry Under 21s in the past. He applied for the Derry Senior manager's job in late 2004 for the 2005 season, but the role eventually went to Mickey Moran. He was also involved in the Derry Senior set-up for a season under manager Paddy Crozier. Bradley was a selector in 2006, but stood down from the role in February 2007, stating he wanted to concentrate on managing Glenullin. He applied for the vacant Derry job in 2008, with the position eventually going to Damian Cassidy.

=== Antrim seniors ===
"The media, the experts, have them maybe 25th in Ireland at the minute. I think they are a lot, lot better than that. There is massive potential there that I think hasn't been touched."

— Bradley upon being appointed Antrim manager for the first time

Shortly before the nomination deadline of 17 October 2008, on the advice of his sons Paddy and Eoin, "good friend" Richard Ferris and Tony Scullion, Bradley applied for the vacant Antrim senior football manager's job. Interviews for the position were held on Wednesday 22 October, and a day later the Antrim County Board secretary Frankie Quinn released a statement stating Bradley had been installed as new Antrim manager for three years, subject to an annual review. Also applying for the job were Brian White, Frank Delargy and Conor MacSherry. Bradley commented "I wanted he job because I see a lot of potential in Antrim," and went on to say "But I am under no illusions about the work me and my backroom team will have to do." Bradley chose Niall Conway of the Ballinderry club in Derry as his assistant manager. Conway guided the Derry minor team to the finals of both the Ulster Minor and All-Ireland Minor Championships in 2007 and Bradley described him as "one of the best young coaches in Ulster". His other selector was Paddy McNeill of Rasharkin, and Creggan's Tony McCollum served as liaison officer. The new physio was Patrina Scullion.

Bradley's first season in charge of Antrim was seen as a hughly successful one. He stated their aim at the start of the year as gaining promotion from Division 4 of the National Football League. Antrim achieved this feat by going undefeated and finishing top of Division 4. Along with second-placed Sligo they qualified for the National League Division 4 final. They were defeated in the final.

The 2009 Championship was Antrim's best in many years. Against the odds they defeated both Donegal and Cavan to qualify for the county's first Ulster Championship final in 39 years. Antrim were aiming to win their first Ulster title since 1951. They were beaten in the decider by reigning All-Ireland champions Tyrone, but Antrim gained a lot of admiration for their performance in the match. They exited the Championship following a defeat to Kerry in Round 4 of the Qualifiers. Contrary to most predictions (Kerry were expected to win comfortably), the game was very close and Antrim were unfortunate not to win.

On 27 August 2012, Bradley's departure as Antrim's senior football manager was announced. On 5 November 2013, Bradley's return as Antrim's senior football manager was announced. On 10 September 2014, Bradley's redeparture as Antrim's senior football manager was announced, having led Antrim to a first championship win in five years during his brief return.

== Return to club management ==
Since leaving Antrim for the second time, Bradley has managed Donegal side Malin.

Bradley joined Ballinascreen in 2018 during a relegation battle. He managed the team to beat the drop. In 2020 Bradley was joined by Ballinascreen minor winning manager Jerome Bradley. Jerome moves up his minor winning team into the first team set-up, including notable players such as Noel Rafferty, Ruairi O'Hagan, José Heron and Daniel Flet.

Gaelic games
Preceded by Jody Gormley	Antrim Senior Football Manager; 2009–2012	Succeeded by Frank Dawson
Preceded by Frank Dawson	Antrim Senior Football Manager; 2013–2014	Succeeded by Frank Fitzsimons
Preceded by Martin McKinless & Gerry McCusker (Ballinderry)	Derry Championship winning manager 2008	Succeeded by Martin McKinless & Paul Devlin (Ballinderry)
