= 1902 All-Ireland Senior Football Championship final =

- Event: 1902 All-Ireland Senior Football Championship
| Dublin | London |
| 2–8 (14) | 0–4 (4) |
- Date: 11 September 1904
- Venue: Athletic Grounds, Cork
- Referee: Thomas F. O'Sullivan (Kerry)
- Attendance: 10,000

The 1902 All-Ireland Senior Football Championship final was the fifteenth All-Ireland Final and the deciding match of the 1902 All-Ireland Senior Football Championship, an inter-county Gaelic football tournament for the top teams in Ireland.

== Match ==
=== Summary ===
Dublin won easily; they led 2–6 to 0–0 at half-time, and relaxed in the second half.

Dublin were represented by their senior club champions of 1901, Bray Emmets (despite their being located in County Wicklow).

It was the second of five All-Ireland SFC titles won by Dublin in the 1900s.

=== Details ===
11 September 1904

| Dublin | 2-8 – 0-4 | London |

Cork
Attendance: 10,000
Referee: Thomas F O'Sullivan (Kerry)

==== Dublin ====
- Jack Dempsey (c)
- Steenie Mulvey
- Dave Brady
- Willie Casey
- Bill Sherry
- Amby Wall
- Jim Brennan
- P. Weymess
- P. D. Breen
- J. McCann
- Tommy Errity
- J. Fahy
- Jack Grace
- J. J. Keane
- Paddy Brady
- Eddie Brady
- Paddy Daly
