= Tommy Murphy Cup =

Gaelic football competition

- Irish: Corn Tomáis Uí Mhurchú
- Code: Gaelic football
- Founded: 2004
- Abolished: 2008
- Trophy: Tommy Murphy Cup
- No. of teams: between 4 and 13
- Last Title holders: Antrim (1st title)
- First winner: Clare
- Most titles: 5 teams (1 titles)
- TV partner: TG4

The Tommy Murphy Cup was a Gaelic football competition in operation from 2004 to 2008, featuring senior county teams eliminated from the early stages of the All-Ireland Senior Football Championship and also Kilkenny when not fielding a team in the All-Ireland series. The competition, organised by the Gaelic Athletic Association, was played during the summer months, with the final being played in August at Croke Park. The Cup was named after Tommy Murphy, a footballer from County Laois who was, appropriately for the competition, the only member of the Team of the Millennium from a county which had not won an All-Ireland.

Later changes to the All-Ireland Senior Football Championship meant that the 2008 Tommy Murphy Cup featured the eight lowest-ranking teams in National Football League, unless the teams reached the final of their respective provincial championships. Antrim defeated the holder Wicklow in the final. The cup was cancelled after the 2008 tournament.

== Format ==
The Tommy Murphy Cup was a single elimination tournament. Each team was afforded only one defeat before being eliminated from the championship. Pairings for matches were drawn at random and there was no seeding. Each match was played as a single leg. If a match was drawn there was a period of extra time; however, if both sides were still level at the end of extra time, a replay took place, and so on until a winner was found.

== Teams ==
=== Debut of counties ===
Year	Debutants	Total
2004	Antrim, Clare, London, Louth, Sligo	5
2005	Carlow, Fermanagh, Kilkenny, Leitrim, Longford, Roscommon, Tipperary, Waterford, Wexford, Wicklow	10
2006	Cavan, Monaghan	2
2007	Offaly	1
2008	None	0
**Total**		**18**

=== List of Tommy Murphy Cup counties ===
County	Total years	First year in Championship	Most recent year in Championship	Championship titles	Last championship title	Best Tommy Murphy Cup finish
Antrim	5	2004	2008	1	2008	**1st**
Carlow	4	2005	2008	0	—	Semi-finals
Cavan	1	2006	2006	0	—	Quarter-finals
Clare	4	2004	2008	1	2004	**1st**
Fermanagh	1	2005	2005	0	—	Quarter-finals
Kilkenny	4	2005	2008	0	—	Preliminary round
Leitrim	3	2005	2008	0	—	2nd
London	5	2004	2008	0	—	Semi-finals
Longford	1	2005	2005	0	—	Semi-finals
Louth	2	2004	2006	1	2006	**1st**
Monaghan	1	2006	2006	0	—	Quarter-finals
Offaly	1	2007	2007	0	—	Quarter-finals
Roscommon	2	2005	2006	0	—	Semi-finals
Sligo	2	2004	2008	0	—	2nd
Tipperary	3	2005	2007	1	2005	**1st**
Waterford	4	2005	2008	0	—	Semi-finals
Wexford	1	2005	2005	0	—	2nd
Wicklow	4	2005	2008	1	2007	**1st**

=== Seasons in Tommy Murphy Cup ===
The number of years that each county team played in the Tommy Murphy Cup between 2004 and 2008. A total of 18 counties have competed in at least one season of the Tommy Murphy Cup. Antrim and London have participated in the most championships. The counties in bold participated in the 2008 Tommy Murphy Cup.

Years	Counties
5	**Antrim**, **London**
4	**Carlow**, **Clare**, **Kilkenny**, **Waterford**, **Wicklow**
3	**Leitrim**, Tipperary
2	Louth, Roscommon, **Sligo**
1	Cavan, Fermanagh, Longford, Monaghan, Offaly, Wexford

== List of finals ==
Year	Date	Winners		Runners-up		Venue	Winning captain	Winning margin	Referee	No. of Teams
Year	Date	County	Score	County	Score	Venue	Winning captain	Winning margin	Referee	No. of Teams
2008	2 August	Antrim	3–12 (21)	Wicklow	1–15 (18)	Croke Park		3		9
2007	4 August	Wicklow	3–13 (22)	Antrim	1–17 (20)	Croke Park		2		9
2006	27 August	Louth	3–14 (23)	Leitrim	1–11 (14)	Croke Park	Martin Farrelly	9	Jimmy McKee	13
2005	4 September	Tipperary	3–10 (19)	Wexford	0–15 (15)	Croke Park		4	J White (Donegal)	9
2004	22 August	Clare	1–11 (14)	Sligo	0–11 (11)	Croke Park		3		4

== Roll of honour ==
Performances in the Tommy Murphy Cup by county
County	Title(s)	Runners-up	Years won	Years runner-up
Wicklow	1	1	2007	2008
Antrim	1	1	2008	2007
Clare	1	0	2004	—
Tipperary	1	0	2005	—
Louth	1	0	2006	—
Sligo	0	1	—	2004
Wexford	0	1	—	2005
Leitrim	0	1	—	2006

Performances in the Tommy Murphy Cup final by province
Province	Winners	Runners-up	Total
Leinster	2	2	4
Munster	2	0	2
Ulster	1	1	2
Connacht	0	2	2

== Team records and statistics ==
=== Team results ===
==== Legend ====
- 1st – Champions
- 2nd – Runners-up
- 3rd – Semi-Final
- QF/PR – Quarter-finals/Preliminary Round
- AI – All-Ireland Senior Football Championship

For each year, the number of teams in each championship (in brackets) are shown.

Team	2004 (5)	2005 (12)	2006 (13)	2007 (9)	2008 (9)	Years
Antrim	SF	QF	SF	2nd	1st	5
Carlow	AI	PR	SF	QF	QF	4
Cavan	AI	AI	QF	AI	AI	1
Clare	1st	AI	PR	SF	QF	4
Fermanagh	AI	QF	AI	AI	AI	1
Kilkenny	—	PR	PR	PR	PR	4
Leitrim	AI	PR	2nd	AI	SF	3
London	QF	QF	QF	QF	SF	5
Longford	AI	SF	AI	AI	AI	1
Louth	SF	AI	1st	AI	AI	2
Monaghan	AI	AI	QF	AI	AI	1
Offaly	AI	AI	AI	QF	AI	1
Roscommon	AI	SF	PR	AI	AI	2
Sligo	2nd	AI	AI	AI	QF	2
Tipperary	AI	1st	QF	QF	AI	3
Waterford	AI	QF	PR	SF	QF	4
Wexford	AI	2nd	AI	AI	AI	1
Wicklow	AI	PR	PR	1st	2nd	4

=== Semi-final appearances ===
#	County	No.	Semi-final appearance years
1	Antrim	4	2004, 2006, 2007, 2008
2	Wicklow	2	2007, 2008
2	Louth	2	2004, 2006
2	Clare	2	2004, 2007
2	Leitrim	2	2006, 2008
6	Sligo	1	2004
6	Tipperary	1	2005
6	Wexford	1	2005
6	Roscommon	1	2005
6	Longford	1	2005
6	Carlow	1	2006
6	Waterford	1	2007
6	London	1	2008

=== All time table ===
Legend

Colours
Currently competing in the All-Ireland Senior Football Championship
Currently competing in the Tailteann Cup
Currently competing in the All-Ireland Junior Football Championship

#	Team	Pld	W	D	L	Points
1	Antrim	12	8	0	4	16
2	Tipperary	7	5	0	2	10
=	Wicklow	8	5	0	3	10
4	Louth	5	4	0	1	8
=	Clare	7	4	0	3	8
6	Leitrim	6	3	0	3	6
=	London	8	3	0	5	6
8	Longford	3	2	0	1	4
=	Wexford	3	2	0	1	4
=	Carlow	6	2	0	4	4
11	Cavan	2	1	0	1	2
=	Fermanagh	2	1	0	1	2
=	Roscommon	3	1	0	2	2
=	Sligo	3	1	0	2	2
=	Waterford	5	1	0	4	2
16	Monaghan	1	0	0	1	0
=	Offaly	1	0	0	1	0
=	Kilkenny	4	0	0	4	0

=== Other records ===
==== Finishing positions ====
- Most championships
  - 1, Clare (2004)
  - 1, Tipperary (2005)
  - 1, Louth (2006)
  - 1, Wicklow (2007)
  - 1, Antrim (2008)
- Most second-place finishes
  - 1, Sligo (2004)
  - 1, Wexford (2005)
  - 1, Leitrim (2006)
  - 1, Antrim (2007)
  - 1, Wicklow (2008)
- Most semi-final finishes
  - 2, Antrim (2004, 2006)
- Most quarter-final finishes
  - 4, London (2004, 2005, 2006, 2007)
- Most preliminary round finishes
  - 4, Kilkenny (2005, 2006, 2007, 2008)

==== Unbeaten sides ====
- All 5 teams have won the Tommy Murphy Cup unbeaten:
  - Clare had 3 wins in 2004.
  - Tipperary had 4 wins in 2005.
  - Louth had 4 wins in 2006.
  - Wicklow had 3 wins in 2007.
  - Antrim had 3 wins in 2008.

==== Beaten sides ====
The knockout format of the cup has resulted in 0 'back-door' Tommy Murphy Cup champions.

==== Final success rate ====
Only 3 counties have appeared in the final, being victorious on all occasions:

- Clare (2004)
- Tipperary (2005)
- Louth (2006)

On the opposite end of the scale, only 3 counties has appeared in the final, losing on each occasion:

- Sligo (2004)
- Wexford (2005)
- Leitrim (2006)

==== Consecutive participations ====
- 5, Antrim (2004–2008)
- 5, London (2004–2008)

Antrim and London have the record number of consecutive participations in the Tommy Murphy Cup, taking part in all 5 seasons.

==== Winning other trophies ====
Although not an officially recognised achievement, one team has achieved the distinction of winning the Tommy Murphy Cup and their respective Division in the National Football League:

- Louth in 2006 (Division 2).

==== Biggest wins ====
- The most one sided finals:
  - 9 points – 2006: Louth 3-14 - 1-11 Leitrim
- The most one sided matches:
  - 38 points – 2007: Kilkenny 1-00 - 3-32 Antrim

==== Scoring Events ====
- Most goals in a match:
  - 00 – 0000: 000 vs 000
- Most points in a match:
  - 00 – 0000: 000 vs 000
- Most goals by one team in a match:
  - 00 – 0000: 000 vs 000
- Most points by one team in a match:
  - 00 – 0000: 000 vs 000
- Highest aggregate score:
  - 00 points – 0000: 000 vs 000
- Lowest aggregate score:
  - 00 points – 0000: 000 vs 000

==== Successful defending ====
Some defending champions have a chance to retain their title. None have achieved this. These are:

- Tipperary on 0 attempts out of 1 (2006)
- Wicklow on 0 attempts out of 1 (2008)

==== Gaps ====
- Longest gaps between successive Tommy Murphy Cup final appearances:
  - 1 year: Antrim (2007–2008)
  - 1 year: Wicklow (2007–2008)
- Longest gap between successive championship appearances
  - 4 years: Sligo (2004–2008)

==== Provinces ====
- The Tommy Murphy Cup final has never involved two teams from the same province.
- The province providing the highest number of different winning teams is Leinster and Munster, with 2:
  - Leinster: Louth and Wicklow
  - Munster: Clare and Tipperary

==== Longest undefeated run ====
The record for the longest unbeaten run stands at 00 games held by 000 (0000–0000).

==== Miscellaneous ====
- Best finish by a debuting team
  - Champions, Clare (2004)
- Best finish by a debuting team (after 2004)
  - Champions, Tipperary (2005)
- Highest winning record
  - 80%, Louth (4 wins in 5 matches)
- Lowest winning record
  - 0%, Kilkenny (0 wins in 4 matches)
  - 0%, Monaghan (0 wins in 1 match)
  - 0%, Offaly (0 wins in 1 match)
- Most played match
  - 00, 000 vs 000 (0000)

== See also ==
- All-Ireland Senior Football Championship
- All-Ireland Senior B Football Championship (1990–2000)
- Tailteann Cup (2022–present)
