= Andy McCallin =

Antrim and Limerick hurler and Gaelic footballer

Sport
Clubs
- Years: Club
- St John's GAA (Antrim); Cushendall; Glenravel; Mungret
Club titles
	Football	Hurling
Antrim titles	8	2
Ulster titles		2
Inter-county
- Years: County
- Antrim (H); Antrim (F); Limerick (H); Limerick (F)
Inter-county titles
	Football	Hurling
Ulster Titles	1 (under 21)	0
All-Ireland Titles	1 (under 21)	0
League titles	0	0
All-Stars	1	0

Andy McCallin was a dual player of Gaelic games (hurling and football) who played for the Antrim and Limerick county teams.

== Early career ==
Belfast-born, McCallin is the only Antrim footballer who has received an All Star Award for his county, which he received in the inaugural year, 1971. Despite this accolade, he was also well known as an excellent hurler for Antrim. His fame began in 1969 when he played a pivotal role in collapsing Roscommon in the All-Ireland Under 21 Football final. Antrim won with a scoreline of 1–8 to 0–10 with the victory over Roscommon, bringing Antrim its first national football title. Playing at corner-forward, McCallin finished the game with a scoring tally of 1–5.

1971 proved to be his most successful year at senior level. He became the first Antrim player since Kevin Armstrong in 1946 to represent Ulster in both football and hurling. Also in 1971, McCallin was on the Ulster side that defeated Connacht in the Railway Cup football final. This proved to be his only inter-provincial title.

== Club career ==
At club level he won eight senior football championship medals for St John's, as well as two senior hurling championship medals. He also won an Ulster club hurling championship medal with St John's.

During the 1970s, he played with Tarbert in Kerry for a spell while he worked in the ESB station there.

In 1980, he left his native county to settle in Limerick, where he played with Mungret. McCallin became a regular on the Limerick county football team and played one game for Limerick in the Oireachtas Cup against Kilkenny.

In 1987, McCallin returned to his native Antrim, choosing to live in Cushendall in the Glens of Antrim. He played hurling with Cushendall and football with Glenravel and went on to represent Antrim masters in 1999. He has since retired from both football and hurling but is managing the senior football team in his St John's for the 2008 season.

=== Management ===
While McCallin was still in his twenties he took up his first management role. As a manager, he won three consecutive titles with county minors with St John's in 1972, 1973 and 1974. With this experience behind him, he became the manager of the Antrim minor team between 1977 and 1980 until he left his native county to settle in Limerick.

In 1984, he became the manager of the Limerick senior football team; this proved to be an unsuccessful period in his career. He returned to Antrim in the late 1980s and has since managed the St. John's senior football team.

He also plays golf off a handicap of 6.
