= Seaghan an Diomáis CLG =

Former Antrim-based Gaelic games club

Seaghan an Diomáis
- County: Antrim
- Colours: Black and amber
- Grounds: Páirc Seaghan an Diomáis, Whiterock Road

Playing kits
Home Kit

Senior Club Championships
	All Ireland	Ulster champions	Antrim champions
Football:	0	0	5
Hurling:	0	0	3

Seaghan an Diomáis CLG was a Gaelic Athletic Club based in Belfast in the early part of the 20th century. As county champions in 1910, they represented Antrim in the subsequent Ulster and All-Ireland Senior Football championships, becoming the first Ulster team to play in an All-Ireland Final.

== Name ==
The name Seaghan an Diomáis [ʃaːn̪ˠ ə ˈdʲʊmˠaːʃ], shaan uh-D'YUH-mawsh) translates to English as Shane the Proud, and refers to Shane O'Neill, an Irish chieftain of the O'Neill dynasty of Ulster in the mid-16th century.

Though they are named for the same person, Seaghan an Diomáis CLG is not related to the current hurling club Shane O'Neill's Glenarm.

== Honours ==
Seaghan an Diomáis won eight county championships in between 1903 and 1915 in both hurling and football.

- Antrim Senior Football Championship (4): 1903, 1906, 1908, 1909, 1910
- Antrim Senior Hurling Championship (3): 1908, 1910, 1915
