= Steenie Mulvey =

Irish Gaelic footballer and revolutionary

Stephen Mulvey
Personal information
- Native name: Stiofán Ó Maoilmhiaigh (Irish)
- Nickname: Steenie
- Born: 3 March 1878 Bray, County Wicklow, Ireland
- Died: 19 October 1954 (aged 76) Bray, County Wicklow, Ireland
- Occupation: Labourer

Sport
- Sport: Gaelic football
Club
- Years: Club
- Bray Emmets
Club titles
- Dublin titles: 1
Inter-county
- Years: County
- 1902: Dublin
Inter-county titles
- Leinster titles: 1
- All-Irelands: 1

Stephen Mulvey (3 March 1878 – 19 October 1954) was an Irish Gaelic footballer and revolutionary. His championship career at senior level for the Dublin county team lasted one season.

Mulvey first played competitive Gaelic football with the Bray Emmets club. He won his sole county senior championship medal in 1901.

Mulvey made his debut on the inter-county scene as a member of the Dublin senior team during the 1902 championship. His one season with the team culminated with the winning of an All-Ireland medal, having earlier won a Leinster medal.

As the political situation in Ireland became more militant, Mulvey joined the Irish Volunteers shortly after their establishment in 1913. During the 1916 Easter Rising he walked from his home in Bray to Dublin city centre to take part in the insurrection.

== Honours ==
Bray Emmets

- Dublin Senior Football Championship (1): 1901

Dublin

- All-Ireland Senior Football Championship (1): 1902
- Leinster Senior Football Championship (1): 1902
