= 1888 Ulster Senior Football Championship =

Gaelic football tournament

1888 Ulster SFC
Tournament details
- Province: Ulster
- Year: 1888
- Date: 19 August - 9 September 1888
- Teams: 2

Winners
- Champions: Monaghan (1st win)

Runners-up
- Runners-up: Cavan

Other
- Matches played: 2
- Total scored: 0-9
- Website: Ulster GAA

The 1888 Ulster Senior Football Championship was the inaugural staging of that competition and was contested by two teams, Moch Finn's of Cavan and Red Hand of Monaghan.

The tournament consisted of two games only; the final on 19 August, which resulted in a draw and the replay on 9 September which Monaghan won.

== Final ==
The final was played at Bryanstown, near Drogheda. It was noted in the Freeman's Journal that it was a "miserably wet" and that the game finished in a draw, 0-2 apiece.

The replay is recorded as being a 0–3 to 0–2 victory for Monaghan.

== All-Ireland Series ==
Monaghan had been due to play Tipperary, as Munster champions, but the All-Ireland Series was cancelled in favour of a US Tour to raise funds for a revival of the Tailteann Games.
