= 1902 All-Ireland Senior Football Championship =

Football championship

All-Ireland Champions
- Winning team: Dublin (8th win)
- Captain: Jack Dempsey

All-Ireland Finalists
- Losing team: London

Provincial Champions
- Munster: Tipperary
- Leinster: Dublin
- Ulster: Armagh
- Connacht: Galway

Championship statistics

The 1902 All-Ireland Senior Football Championship was the 16th staging of Ireland's premier Gaelic football knock-out competition. Dublin were the winners.

== Format ==
The four provincial championships are played as usual. The four champions play in the "Home" championship, with the winners of the Home final going on to face London in the All-Ireland final.

== Results ==
=== Connacht ===
Connacht Senior Football Championship

Galway were the only entrants, so they got a bye to the Home semi-final.

=== Leinster ===
Leinster Senior Football Championship

1902
Preliminary Round

Kilkenny	1–8 – 0–4	Laois

Kilkenny

1902
Preliminary Round

Louth	2–10 – 0–2	Westmeath

Jones' Road, Dublin

1902
Preliminary Round

Laois	2–7 – 0–5	Meath

Jones' Road, Dublin

15 November 1903
Quarter-Final

Kildare	0–3 – 0–7	Kilkenny

Carlow

24 January 1904
Quarter-Final

Offaly	0–3 – 0–3 Unfinished	Wexford

Jones' Road, Dublin
Referee: D O Callaghan

7 February 1904
Quarter-Final Replay

Offaly	0–5 – 0–10 Unfinished	Wexford

Jones' Road, Dublin
Referee: J Kenny

The match was unfinished and a replay ordered.

6 March 1904
Quarter-Final Replay No.2

Offaly	0–1 – 3–6	Wexford

Jones' Road, Dublin
Referee: D O Callaghan

1904
Semi-Final

Kilkenny	0–7 – 0–7	Wexford

1904
Semi-Final Replay

Kilkenny	0–1 – 0–4	Wexford

Carlow

1904
Semi-Final

Dublin	1–6 – 0–2	Louth

Navan

1 May 1904
Final

Dublin	2–4 – 0–2 Unfinished	Wexford

Carlow

The match was unfinished and a replay ordered.

June 12, 1904
Final Replay

Dublin	1–5 – 0–5	Wexford

Kilkenny

=== Munster ===
Munster Senior Football Championship

28 June 1903
Quarter-Final

Cork	0–7 – 1–2	Clare

Tipperary

10 May 1903
Quarter-Final

Kerry	0–4 – 0–3	Waterford

Cork

9 August 1903
Semi-Final

Kerry	2–7 – 0–3	Cork

Millstreet

1902
Semi-Final

Tipperary	5–6 – 1–4	Limerick

Cork
Referee: J. Fitzgerald

4 October 1903
Final

Tipperary	1–4 – 1–4	Kerry

Turner's Cross
Referee: J. Fitzgerald

1 November 1903
Final Replay

Tipperary	1–6 – 1–5	Kerry

Turner's Cross
Referee: J. Fitzgerald

=== Ulster ===
Ulster Senior Football Championship

3 January 1904
Semi-Final

Armagh	0–3 – 0–2 abandoned	Tyrone

Abbey Park, Armagh

31 January 1904
Semi-Final Replay

Armagh	1–6 – 0–3	Tyrone

Emmett Park, Dungannon

7 February 1904
Semi-Final

Antrim	1–3 – 0–1	Cavan

Seaghan an Diomáis Park, Belfast

3 April 1904
Final

Armagh	2–2 – 1–4	Antrim

Seaghan an Diomáis Park, Belfast

=== Semi-finals ===
24 April 1904
Home Semi-Final

Tipperary	2–5 – 0–4	Galway

Athenry
Referee: Mr O'Sullivan

5 June 1904
Home Semi-Final

Dublin	4–16 – 1–6	Armagh

Drogheda

24 July 1904
Home Final

Dublin	0–6 – 0–5	Tipperary

Kilkenny
Referee: J. McCarthy

=== Final ===
11 September 1904
Final

Dublin	2–8 – 0–4	London

Cork
Attendance: 10,000
Referee: Thomas F O'Sullivan (Kerry)

== Statistics ==
- Dublin win another two-in-a-row as All Ireland Champions.
