= Antrim county football team =

Gaelic football team

Antrim
- Sport: Football
- Irish: Aontroim
- Nickname(s): The Saffrons
- County board: Antrim GAA
- Manager: Mark Doran
- Captain: Eoghan McCabe
- Home venue(s): Corrigan Park, Belfast

Recent competitive record
- Current All-Ireland status: Ulster (QF) in 2025
- Last championship title: None
- Current NFL Division: 4 (7th in 2025; relegated to Division 4)
- Last league title: 'NFL Division 4 Winners 2021'
First colours	Second colours

The Antrim county football team represents Antrim GAA, the county board of the Gaelic Athletic Association, in the Gaelic sport of football. The team competes in the three major annual inter-county competitions: the All-Ireland Senior Football Championship, the Ulster Senior Football Championship and the National Football League.

Antrim's home ground is Casement Park, Belfast; however, this has been closed for redevelopment since 2013, with most home games being played instead at Corrigan Park. The team's manager is Mark Doran

The team last won the Ulster Senior Championship in 1951 but has never won the All-Ireland Senior Championship or the National League.

== History ==
The county team has won the Ulster Senior Football Championship (SFC) on ten occasions: 1900, 1901, 1908, 1909, 1910, 1911, 1912, 1913, 1946 and 1951.

The county team was the first in the province of Ulster to appear in an All-Ireland Senior Football Championship (SFC) final, doing so in 1911 and repeating the feat again in 1912, but losing on both occasions.

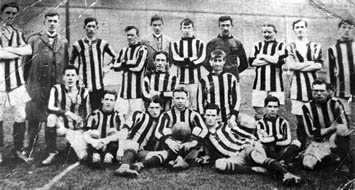
Antrim team of 1912, All-Ireland finalist

Antrim's 1911 All-Ireland SFC semi-final win was not anticipated. The Ulster secretary got sick that year and did not organise a provincial championship. So Antrim arrived to play Kilkenny without having practiced and won by a scoreline of 3–1 to 1–1. The following year Antrim defeated Kerry. Heavy rain on the day, and over-indulgence at a wedding the day before were blamed for the unexpected 3–5 to 0–2 defeat. Antrim's County Board decision to introduce a City League in 1908, one of the first in Gaelic history, was a more legitimate explanation.

The 1946 Antrim football team was regarded as one of the most exciting of the era, taking advantage of the newly reintroduced handpass. Joe McCallin's two goals contributed to Antrim's defeat of Cavan in the Ulster SFC final. However, Kerry roughed them out of the All-Ireland SFC semi-final.

The opening of Casement Park boosted the sport in Belfast, but — from the late 1960s — the troubles restricted sporting life in the football heartlands of Belfast, particularly in Ardoyne. Political violence meant that the county could not build on the under-21 team of 1969, one of the finest in Ulster history (Din Joe McGrogan — scorer of the goals that put Antrim in the final — was killed by a loyalist bomb). The county's Vocational Schools team has made it to two All-Ireland finals: in 1968, when the team defeated Galway, and in 1971, when Mayo won.

Congregation of Christian Brothers member Laurence (Larry) Ennis (1933-2021) served as Antrim manager from 1979 until 1981, leading the team to a Dr McKenna Cup title, defeating Tyrone, Down and Armagh along the way.

A drawn Ulster SFC semi-final with Derry in 2000 was one of Antrim football's recent highlights, alongside winning the 2008 Tommy Murphy Cup. In that final the team defeated Wicklow, a reverse of the previous year's final. Antrim reached the 2009 Ulster SFC final, the first Antrim team to do so for 31 years, but lost to 2008 All-Ireland SFC winners Tyrone.

Jody Gormley was named Antrim manager ahead of the 2007 All-Ireland SFC, a role he held for two seasons.

Lenny Harbinson managed the team from 2017 until 2020. He was unable to gain promotion from Division 4 of the National Football League and the county exited the Ulster SFC in its first game in each of his three years, though defeated Louth in an away 2019 All-Ireland SFC qualifier.

In November 2020, Enda McGinley was appointed manager. McGinley brought his former Tyrone teammate Stephen O'Neill in as part of his backroom team and Brendan Murphy was appointed as strength and conditioning coach. McGinley and his backroom team left at the end of May 2022.

Less than two months later, Andy McEntee was unexpectedly appointed as McGinley's successor as manager on a three-year term. He saw out that term, and then stepped down.

== Managerial history ==
Dates	Name	Origin
1999–2002	Brian White	O'Donovan Rossa
2002–2007	PJ O'Hare	St Gall's
2007–2008	Jody Gormley	Tyrone
2008–2012	Liam Bradley	Derry
2012–2013	Frank Dawson	Down
2013–2014	Liam Bradley	Derry
2015–2016	Frank Fitzsimons	Lámh Dhearg
2017–2020	Lenny Harbinson	St Gall's
2020–2022	Enda McGinley	Tyrone
2022–2025	Andy McEntee	Meath
2025–	Mark Doran	

== Players ==
=== All Stars ===
Antrim has one All Star.

1971: Andy McCallin

== Team sponsorship ==
Antrim unveiled a sponsorship agreement with Fibrus in December 2022, projected to last five years.

== Honours ==
Official honours, with additions noted.

=== National ===
- All-Ireland Senior Football Championship
  - (silver) Runners-up (2): 1911, 1912
- All-Ireland Senior B Football Championship
  - (gold) Winners (1): 1999
- Tommy Murphy Cup
  - (gold) Winners (1): 2008
  - (silver) Runners-up (1): 2007
- National Football League Division 4
  - (gold) Winners (1): 2021 (shared with Louth)
- All-Ireland Under-21 Football Championship
  - (gold) Winners (1): 1969
- All-Ireland Vocational Schools Championship
  - (gold) Winners (1): 1968

=== Provincial ===
- Ulster Senior Football Championship
  - (gold) Winners (10): 1900, 1901, 1908, 1909, 1910, 1911, 1912, 1913, 1946, 1951
  - (silver) Runners-up (9): 1903, 1906, 1918, 1919, 1925, 1926, 1947, 1948, 1970, 2009
- Dr McKenna Cup
  - (gold) Winners (6): 1941, 1942, 1945, 1946, 1966, 1981
- Dr Lagan Cup
  - (gold) Winners (3): 1944, 1946, 1948
