= 2007 Tommy Murphy Cup =

The fourth Tommy Murphy Cup Gaelic football competition began on June 30, 2007. The competition is in knockout format: the eight teams relegated to the National Football League 2007 Division 4 compete, plus Kilkenny. The competition was won by Wicklow in a final that was forced into extra-time against Antrim. The final score was 3-13 to 1-17.

== Results ==
Game	Date	Venue	Team	Score	Team	Score
Preliminary	June 30	Nowlan Park	Kilkenny	1-00	Antrim	3-32
First Round	July 7	Fraher Field	Waterford	8-10	Carlow	0-07
First Round	July 7	Aughrim Park	Wicklow	1-16	Offaly	1-11
First Round	July 7	Ardfinnan	Tipperary	0-12	Clare	1-13
First Round	July 7	Ruislip	London	1-10	Antrim	4-11
Semi-Final	July 14	Cusack Park	Clare	0-10	Antrim	1-11
Semi-Final	July 14	Aughrim Park	Wicklow	2-15	Waterford	0-14
Final (AET)	August 4	Croke Park	Antrim	1-17	Wicklow	3-13
