= 2008 All-Ireland Senior Football Championship =

Football championship

Championship details
- Dates: 11 May – 21 September 2008
- Teams: 33

All-Ireland Champions
- Winning team: Tyrone (3rd win)
- Captain: Brian Dooher
- Manager: Mickey Harte

All-Ireland Finalists
- Losing team: Kerry
- Captain: Tomás Ó Sé
- Manager: Pat O'Shea

Provincial Champions
- Munster: Cork
- Leinster: Dublin
- Ulster: Armagh
- Connacht: Galway

Championship statistics
- No. matches played: 55
- Goals total: 110 (2.00 per game)
- Points total: 1348 (24.51 per game)
- Top Scorer: Johnny Doyle (2–26)
- Player of the Year: Seán Cavanagh

The 2008 All-Ireland Senior Football Championship was that year's Gaelic football championship, having thrown-in on 11 May 2008 and concluded with the All-Ireland final at Croke Park on 21 September 2008. Tyrone beat Kerry in the decider.

The draw for the provincial championships took place on 14 October 2007.

== Results ==
=== Munster Senior Football Championship ===
Quarter-finals
Waterford	0–07
Clare	0–09
Tipperary	1–05
Limerick	1–08

Semi-finals
Clare	0–05
Kerry	1–14
Cork	2–09
Limerick	0–12

Final
Cork	1–16
Kerry	1–11

25 May 2008
Quarter-final

Waterford	0–07 – 0–09	Clare
C Power 0–5 (5f), G Hurney, L Ó Lionain (0–1 each); J Walsh SO	Report	D Tubridy 0–5 (4f), S Hickey (0–2), J Hayes, G Quinlan (0–1 each)

Cusack Park, Ennis
Referee: A Mangan (Kerry)

25 May 2008
Quarter-final

Limerick	1–08 – 1–05	Tipperary
S Buckley 1–1, I Ryan 0–3 (3f), S Lavin, S Kelly, M Crowley, J Cooke 0–1 each	Report	B Grogan 1–4 (1f), D O'Brien 0–1; A Foley SO

Páirc Mac Gearailt, Fermoy
Referee: R Hickey (Clare)

15 June 2008
Semi-final

Clare	0–05 – 1–14	Kerry
R Donnelly 0–2, D Tubridy 0–3 (2f, 1 '45')	Report	B Sheehan 0–5 (4f), C Cooper 1–0, A O'Mahony 0–2, D O Se, P Galvin, Declan O'Sullivan, Darren O'Sullivan, E Brosnan, T Walsh, T O'Se 0–1 each P Galvin SO

FitzGerald Stadium, Killarney

15 June 2008
Semi-final

Limerick	0–12 – 2–09	Cork
I Ryan 0–5 (2f), M Crowley 0–4 (1f), J Galvin, S Kelly, J Cooke 0–1 each	Report	D Goulding 1–1, J Hayes 0–3, G Canty 1–0, N Murphy (2f), D O'Connor (2f) 0–2 each, P O'Neill 0–1

Gaelic Grounds, Limerick

6 July 2008
Final

Kerry	1–11 – 1–16	Cork
D Walsh 1–1, B Sheehan (3f), C Cooper (2f) 0–3 each, S O'Sullivan 0–2, T O'Se, D O'Se 0–1 each D O'Se, M O'Se SO	Report	D Goulding 0–7 (5f), M Cussen 1–1, D O'Connor 0–4 (2f), J Hayes, F Goold, J Masters, P Kerrigan 0–1 each N Murphy SO

Páirc Uí Chaoimh, Cork
Attendance: 22,784
Referee: D Fahy (Longford)

Top Scorer: D Goulding (Cork); 1-08

=== Leinster Senior Football Championship ===
Preliminary round
Meath	1–25
Carlow	0–08
Kildare	0–09
Wicklow	0–13
Westmeath	2–10
Longford	1–10

Quarter-finals
Meath	2–13
Wexford	2–14
Wicklow	0–13
Laois	0–15
Westmeath	2–11
Offaly	1–08
Dublin	1–22
Louth	0–12

Semi-finals
Wexford	0–18
Laois	0–12
Westmeath	1–08
Dublin	0–13

Final
Wexford	0–09
Dublin	3–23

11 May 2008
Preliminary round

Longford	1–10 – 2–10	Westmeath
P Barden 1–1, Martin 0–3 (2f), McGee (2f), Kavanagh 0–2 each, K Mulligan, Masterson 0–1 each	Report	Mangan, Glennon 1–1 each, Wilson 0–3 (3f), Flanagan 0–3 (2f), Dolan 0–2 (2f)

Pearse Park, Longford

18 May 2008
Preliminary round

Kildare	0–09 – 0–13	Wicklow
A Smith 0–3, J Doyle 0–2 (0-2f), K Cribben, M Conway, R Sweeney, T Fennin (0-1f) 0–1 each.	Report	T Hannon 0–6 (0-4f, 0–1 '45'), S Furlong 0–4 (0-2f), P Earls, L Glynn, C Walsh 0–1 each.

Croke Park, Dublin

18 May 2008
Preliminary round

Meath	1–25 – 0–08	Carlow
C Ward 0–7 (3f), J Sheridan 1–3, S Bray 0–4, G Geraghty, B Farrell (2f), A Nestor, C O’Connor 0–2 each, G Reilly, C King, B Meade 0–1 each.	Report	JJ Smith 0–3 (2f), D St Leger, E McCormack (1f) 0-02 each, A Curran 0–1

Croke Park, Dublin

31 May 2008
Quarter-final

Wicklow	0–13 – 0–15	Laois
T Hannon 0–7 (2f, 2 '45'), L Glynn, P Earls 0–2 each, D Odlum, C Walsh 0–1 each.	Report	R Munnelly 0–5, B McCormack 0–3, MJ Tierney 0–2, T Kelly, P McMahon, J O'Loughlin, BC Kelly, B Brennan 0–1 each

Dr. Cullen Park, Carlow

1 June 2008
Quarter-final

Meath	2–13 – 2–14	Wexford
S Bray 1–2, G Geraghty 1–0, J Sheridan, P Byrne 0–3 each, C Ward (2f), A Nestor 0–2 each, M Ward 0–1; M Ward SO	Report	R Barry, PJ Banville 1–1 each, C Lyng (2f), M Forde (1f) 0–4 each, C Morris, P Colfer, A Morrissey, S Roche 0–1 each

Dr. Cullen Park, Carlow

7 June 2008
Quarter-final

Westmeath	2–11 – 1–08	Offaly
F Wilson (2f), D Dolan (2f) 1–4 each, F Boyle, D Glennon 0–1 each	Report	N McNamee 1–5 (3f), C McManus 0–3 (2f); S Sullivan SO

O'Connor Park, Tullamore
Attendance: 13105
Referee: Jimmy McKee (Armagh)

8 June 2008
Quarter-final

Louth	0–12 – 1–22	Dublin
A Hoey 0–3 (1f), D Crilly 0–2 (1f), R Finnegan, P Keenan, R Carroll, C Judge, S Lennon, J Murray, B White 0–1 each	Report	A Brogan 1–7, T Quinn 0–6 (3f), C Keaney 0–3 (3f), C Moran, J Sherlock 0–2 each, P Andrews, M Vaughan 0–1 each

Croke Park, Dublin

22 June 2008
Semi-final

Laois	0–12 – 0–18	Wexford
C Parkinson 0–4, C Kelly 0–3 (2f), MJ Tierney 0–2 (1f), R Munnelly (f), M Timmons, P McMahon 0–1 each	Report	M Forde 0–6 (2 '45'), PJ Banville, R Barry 0–3 each, A Morrissey 0–2, E Bradley, C Lyng, B Doyle, S Roche 0–1 each

Croke Park, Dublin

29 June 2008
Semi-final

Westmeath	1–08 – 0–13	Dublin
D Dolan 0–5 (3f), M Ennis 1–0, D Glennon 0–3 (1f)	Report	T Quinn 0–3 (3f), C Keaney (2f), D Connolly 0–2 each, C Whelan, C Moran, D Henry, B Cahill, A Brogan, J Sherlock 0–1 each

Croke Park, Dublin

20 July 2008
Final

Wexford	0–09 – 3–23	Dublin
C Lyng 0–4, M Forde, E Bradley 0–2 each, R Barry 0–1	Report	A Brogan 1–4, C Keaney 0–6, D Connolly 1–3, T Quinn 0–4, J Sherlock 0–3, M Vaughan 1–0, C Moran, B Cahill, S Ryan 0–1 each

Croke Park, Dublin
Attendance: 80,112
Referee: Gearoid Ó Conamha (Galway)

Top Scorer: A Brogan (Dublin); 2–12

=== Connacht Senior Football Championship ===
Quarter-finals
New York	0–06
Leitrim	0–17
Roscommon	0–06
Galway	2–16
London	0–07
Sligo	2–17

Semi-finals
Leitrim	1–13
Galway	2–14
Mayo	3–11
Sligo	0–07

Final
Galway	2–12
Mayo	1–14

11 May 2008
Quarter-final

New York	0–06 – 0–17	Leitrim
L. O'Donnell 0-02 (2f), A. O'Connor, D. Doona, P. Smyth, M. Dobbin 0-01 each.	Report	E. Mulligan 0–10 (9f), M. Duignan 0-03, D. Maxwell, D. O'Connor, D. Brennan, P. McGuinness 0-01 each.

Gaelic Park, New York City

18 May 2008
Quarter-final

Galway	2–16 – 0–06	Roscommon
M Clancy 1–3, P Conroy 0–6 (4f), M Meehan 0–5 (2f, 2x'45'), N Coleman 1–0, P Joyce 0–2	Report	S Kilbride 0–3, G Heneghan 0–2 (2f), K Mannion 0–1; G Cox SO

Pearse Stadium, Galway

25 May 2008
Quarter-final

London	0–07 – 2–17	Sligo
P Hehir, CD Tara (0–3 each), A Rafferty (0–1)	Report	M Breheny 1–11, G Gaughan 1–2, J Davey 0–2, B Curran, D Kelly (0-01 each)

Ruislip, London

15 June 2008
Semi-final

Galway	2–14 – 1–13	Leitrim
P Joyce 1–4 (1f), C Bane 1–2, M Meehan 0–4 (1f), N Joyce 0–2, M Clancy, N Coleman 0–1 each	Report	E Mulligan 0–10 (10f), D Maxwell 1–1, D Brennan, M Foley 0–1 each

Pearse Stadium, Galway

22 June 2008
Semi-final

Mayo	3–11 – 0–07	Sligo
C Mortimer 0–5, A Kilcoyne 1–1, P Harte 1–1 (1–0 pen), T Mortimer 1–0, T Parsons, A O'Malley 0–2 each	Report	M Breheny 0–4 (3f), D Kelly 0–3

McHale Park, Castlebar

13 July 2008
Final

Galway	2–12 – 1–14	Mayo
P Joyce 1–3, F Breathnach 1–0, M Meehan (2f), C Bane 0–3 each, G Bradshaw, S Armstrong, P Conroy 0–1 each	Report	A Dillon 0–7 (5f), A Kilcoyne 1–0, BJ Padden, C Mortimer 0–2 each, T Mortimer, R McGarrity, P Harte 0–1 each

McHale Park, Castlebar
Attendance: 31,789
Referee: David Coldrick (Meath)

Top Scorer: E Mulligan (Leitrim); 0–20

=== Ulster Senior Football Championship ===
Preliminary round
Antrim	1–14
Cavan	1–19

Quarter-finals
Tyrone	0–21
Down	1–19
Cavan	0–13
Armagh	0–17
Monaghan	0–10
Fermanagh	2–08
Donegal	1–12
Derry	1–14

Semi-finals
Down	0–11
Armagh	1–12
Fermanagh	1–11
Derry	1–09

Final
Armagh	1–11
Fermanagh	0–08

18 May 2008
Preliminary round

Antrim	1–14 – 1–19	Cavan
CJ McGourty 1–4, P Cunningham 0–4 (0–3 frees), T McCann 0–3 (0–1 free, 0–1 '45'), K Niblock, M Magill 0–1 each	Report	S Johnston 0–8 (0–1 free), D McCabe 1–1 (0–1 free), M Reilly 0–3, R Flanagan, J O'Reilly 0–2, M Cahill, M McDonald 0–1 each

Casement Park, Belfast

25 May 2008
Quarter-final

Fermanagh	2–08 – 0–10	Monaghan
C McElroy 1–1, L McBarron 1–0, R Keenan 0–3 (0–3 frees), M McGrath, M Little, E Maguire, S McCabe (0–1 each)	Report	P Finlay 0–3 (0–1 free), T Freeman 0–3 (0–2 frees), E Lennon, C McManus, V Corey, C Hanratty (0–1 each); G McQuaid SO

Brewster Park, Enniskillen

1 June 2008
Quarter-final

Donegal	1–12 – 1–14	Derry
C McFadden 0–6 (0–3 frees), M Murphy 1–1 (1-00 pen), R Kavanagh 0–2, B Monaghan, K Cassidy, D Walsh 0–1 each	Report	P Bradley 0–10 (0–7 frees), E Bradley 1–1, C Gilligan 0–2 (0–2 frees), E. Muldoon 0–1

MacCumhaill Park, Ballybofey

8 June 2008
Quarter-final

Tyrone	2–08 – 2–08	Down
S Cavanagh, C McCullagh 1–2 each, B Dooher, M Penrose, C Cavanagh (0–1 free), K Hughes 0–1 each	Report	A Rodgers 1–1, B Coulter 1–0, L Doyle 0–2 (0–2 frees), D Gordon 0–2, R Sexton 0–1, P McCumiskey 0–1(0–1 free), P Murphy 0–1 each

Healy Park, Omagh

14 June 2008
Quarter-final Replay

Down	1–19 – 0–21 AET	Tyrone
L Doyle 0–6 (6f), B Coulter 1–3, A Carr 0–4 (3f, 1 '45'), P Murphy, D Gordon, A Rodgers, D Hughes, J Clarke, K McKernan 0–1 each	Report	T McGuigan 0–6 (0–4 frees), C Cavanagh 0–4 (0–4 frees), S Cavanagh, C McCullagh 0–4 (0–1 free) each, P Jordan, R Mellon, M Penrose 0–1 each

Páirc Esler, Newry

15 June 2008
Quarter-final

Armagh	0–17 – 0–13	Cavan
S McDonnell 0–6 (0–1 free, 0–1 '45'), S Kernan 0–3, A Kernan 0–2 (0–1 free), R Clarke 0–2, P McKeever, P McGrane, C Vernon, K Toner 0–1 each	Report	S Johnston 0–6 (0–3 frees), D McCabe 0–3 (0–2 frees), C Mackey 0–2, M Reilly, M McKeever 0–1 each

Breffni Park, Cavan

21 June 2008
Semi-final

Fermanagh	1–11 – 1–09	Derry
R Keenan 0–4 (0–3 frees), B Owens 1–0, E Maguire 0–2, D Kelly, T McElroy, M McGrath, M Little, L McBarron 0–1 each	Report	E Bradley 1–1, P Bradley 0–3 (0–1 free), C Gilligan 0–2 (0–1 free, 0–1 '45'), R wilkinson 0–2, M McIver 0–1

Healy Park, Omagh

29 June 2008
Semi-final

Down	0–11 – 1–12	Armagh
A Carr 0–6 (0–6 frees), D Hughes, R Murtagh, D Gordon, J Colgan, P McComiskey 0–1 each	Report	S Kernan 1–2, R Clarke 0–3, S McDonnell 0–3, B Donaghy 0–1, P McKeever 0–1 (0–1 free), A O'Rourke 0–1, B Mallon 0–1

St Tiernach's Park, Clones

20 July 2008
Final

Fermanagh	1–11 – 2–08	Armagh
E Maguire 1–0, M McGrath 0–2, C McElroy 0–2, M Little 0–2 (0–2 frees), S McDermott 0–1, T McElroy 0–1, M Murphy 0–1, R Keenan 0–1 (0–1 free), S Doherty 0–1	Report	S McDonnell 0–6 (0–1 free), R Clarke 1–1, F Moriarty 1–0, K Toner 0–1

St Tiernach's Park, Clones

27 July 2008
Final Replay

Fermanagh	0–08 – 1–11	Armagh
E Maguire, T Brewster (1f) 0–2 each, D Kelly, R Keenan, M Little (1f), S McCabe 0–1 each	Report	S McDonnell 1–2 (1f), A Kernan 0–4 (4f), R Clarke, T Kernan (1f) 0–2 each, B Mallon 0–1

St Tiernach's Park, Clones

Top Scorer: S McDonnell; 1–17

=== All-Ireland qualifiers ===
==== Round 1 ====
The first round of the All-Ireland Qualifier Series included all the counties that did not qualify for their respective provincial final with the exceptions of Antrim, Carlow, Clare, Kilkenny, Leitrim, London, Sligo, Waterford and Wicklow. (These nine teams played in the Tommy Murphy Cup as a result of their participation in Division 4 of the 2009 National Football League.)

The sixteen teams competing in the first round were Cavan, Derry, Donegal, Down, Kildare, Laois, Limerick, Longford, Louth, Meath, Monaghan, Offaly, Roscommon, Tipperary, Tyrone and Westmeath. Unlike previous years, teams that played each other in their provincial championships were permitted to meet again in the qualifiers. The first round draw took place on 29 June 2008. The first team drawn had home venue provided their ground meets the minimum safety requirements. The first round of games took place on 19 July 2008.

19 July 2008 Round 1	Limerick	4-12- 4–03	Meath	Gaelic Grounds, Limerick
	I Ryan 3–7, J Galvin 1–1, M Crowley 0–2 (0–1 free), S Buckley, G Collins 0–1 each	Report	J Sheridan 2–0 (1–0 pen), B Farrell 1–1, S Bray 1–0, C Ward 0–2

19 July 2008 Round 1	Longford	0–11 – 1–10	Laois	Pearse Park, Longford
	F McGee 0–4 (0–1 free), B Kavanagh 0–3 (0–2 frees), P Dowd, P Barden 0–2 each	Report	D Kingston 1–3 (0–1 free), MJ Tierney 0–3 (0–3 frees), T Kelly, B Quigley, R Munnelly, B Brennan 0–1 each

19 July 2008 Round 1	Kildare	1–16 – 1–15	Cavan	St. Conleth's Park, Newbridge
	J Doyle 0–8 (0–4 frees), J Kavanagh 1–0, A Smyth, K Donnelly 0–2 each, E Bolton, D Earley, P O'Neill, E Callaghan 0–1 each	Report	S Johnston 0–6 (0–3 frees), D McCabe 0–4 (0–4 frees), P Brady 1–0, E O'Reilly 0–2, R Flanagan, M Reilly, C Mackey 0–1 each

19 July 2008 Round 1	Offaly	2–10 – 5–19	Down	O'Connor Park, Tullamore
	P Kelleghan 2–1, N McNamee 0–4 (0–2 frees), J Reynolds 0–2, G Comerford 0–2, C McManus 0–1 (0–1 free)	Report	R Murtagh 0–4, J Clarke 1–3, K McKernan 1–2, D Hughes 1–1, A Carr 0–2, R Sexton 1–1, D Gordon 0–2, B Coulter 1–1, A Rodgers 0–1, J Fegan 0–2 (0–1 free)	Referee: Aidan Mangan (Kerry)

19 July 2008 Round 1	Louth	1–10 – 1–18	Tyrone	Drogheda Park, Drogheda
	D Clarke 1–3 (0–1 free), S Lennon 0–3 (0–1 pen), B White 0–3 (0–2 frees), A Hoey 0–1 (0–1 free)	Report	C McCullagh 0–5 (0–1 free), S Cavanagh 0–4, E McGinley 1–1, B McGuigan 0–3, P Jordan, R Mellon, B Dooher, T McGuigan, M Penrose 0–1 each

19 July 2008 Round 1	Tipperary	0–06 – 0–15	Westmeath	Ardfinnan
	B Coen 0–2 (0–2 frees), B Grogan 0–1, P Austin 0–1, T Dalton 0–1, B Mulvihill 0–1 (0–1 free)	Report	D Dolan 0–6 (0–5 frees), Denis Glennon 0–5, M Ennis 0–1, S Quinn 0–1, David Glennon 0–1, J Smyth 0–1	Referee: M. Deegan (Laois)

19 July 2008 Round 1	Donegal	3–11 – 1–09	Roscommon	MacCumhaill Park, Ballybofey
	M Murphy 2–2 (1–0 pen, 0–2 frees), C McFadden 0–5 (0–3 frees, 0–1 '45'), S Griffin 1–0, R Kavanagh 0–1, K Rafferty 0–1, D Walsh 0–1, C Toye 0–1	Report	G Heneghan 0–6 (0–5 frees), K Mannion 1–1 (1–0 pen), S Kilbride 0–1, S O'Neill 0–1

19 July 2008 Round 1	Monaghan	1–13 – 1–12	Derry	St. Tiernach's Park, Clones
	T Freeman 0–5 (0–2 frees), C Hanratty 0–3, D Clerkin 1–0, S Gollogly 0–2, C McManus 0–1, R Woods 0–1, S Smith 0–1	Report	P Bradley 0–4 (0–2 frees), E Bradley 1–1, M Lynch 0–2, J O'Kane 0–1, E. Muldoon 0–1, F Doherty 0–1, C Devlin 0–1, C McKeague 0–1

==== Round 2 ====
The second round featured the eight winning teams from the first round in an open draw. The second round draw took place on 20 July 2008. As in the first round, the first drawn team had home advantage. These games were played on 26 July 2008.

26 July 2008 Round 2	Donegal	0–15 – 0–16	Monaghan	MacCumhaill Park, Ballybofey
	M Murphy 0–5 (5f), C McFadden 0–3 (3f), R Kavanagh, B Roper, C Toye 0–2 each, D Walsh 0–1	Report	P Finlay 0–7 (6f), R Woods 0–3, T Freeman 0–2, E Lennon, S Gollogly, C McManus, C Hanratty 0–1 each

26 July 2008 Round 2	Tyrone	0–14 – 1–07	Westmeath	Healy Park, Omagh
	T McGuigan 0–6 (2f), B Dooher, M Penrose 0–2 each, D McCaul, E McGinley, R Mellon, D Harte 0–1 each	Report	D Dolan 0–4 (4f), M Ennis 1–0, Denis Glennon 0–2 (1f), J Smyth 0–1; D Healy, D Harte SO

26 July 2008 Round 2	Limerick	0–11 – 1–11	Kildare	Gaelic Grounds, Limerick
	I Ryan 0–5 (5f), S Buckley 0–2, S Lavin, J Donovan, J Galvin, J Ryan 0–1 each	Report	J Doyle 1–6 (3f, 1 '45', 1 sl), M Conway 0–2, J Kavanagh, P O'Neill, K Donnelly 0–1 each

26 July 2008 Round 2	Laois	1–15 – 2–14	Down	O'Moore Park, Portlaoise
	D Kingston 1–5 (4f), MJ Tierney (2f), B McCormack 0–3 each, C Healy, B Brennan, C Parkinson, R Munnelly (1f) 0–1 each	Report	B Coulter 1–2, A Carr 0–4 (4f), J Clarke 1–1, K McKernan 0–3, P Murphy, A Rodgers, J Fegan, R Murtagh 0–1 each D Gordon SO

==== Round 3 ====
In the third round, the four winning teams from the second round were drawn against the four losing provincial finalists. The third round draw took place on 27 July 2008. Venues were decided by the Central Competitions Control Committee. These games were played on 2 and 3 August 2008. The winners of these games went on to play the four provincial champions in the All-Ireland quarter-finals.

2 August 2008 Round 3	Tyrone	0–13 – 1–09	Mayo	Croke Park, Dublin
	S Cavanagh 0–4 (1f), C McCullagh (1f), T McGuigan (2f) 0–2 each, D Harte, E McGinley, M Penrose, B Dooher, R McMenamin 0–1 each	Report	C Mortimer 1–4 (3f), A Dillon 0–3 (3f), BJ Padden 0–2

2 August 2008 Round 3	Down	0–12 – 2–13	Wexford	Croke Park, Dublin
	A Carr 0–6 (6f), A Rodgers, B Coulter 0–2 each, D Rooney, S Kearney 0–1 each	Report	M Forde 0–7 (5f, 1 '45'), C Lyng (1f), PJ Banville 1–1 each, R Barry 0–2, P Colfer, R Stafford 0–1 each

3 August 2008 Round 3	Kildare	0–11 – 0–05	Fermanagh	Croke Park, Dublin
	J Doyle 0–5 (2f, 1 '45'), J Kavanagh 0–2, E Bolton, D Flynn, P O'Neill, D Earley 0–1 each	Report	E Maguire, R Keenan, T Brewster, S Doherty, M Little (1f) 0–1 each

3 August 2008 Round 3	Monaghan	0–13 – 1–13	Kerry	Croke Park, Dublin
	T Freeman 0–5 (3f), G McQuaid, R Woods, P Finlay (2f) 0–2 each, E Lennon, V Corey 0–1 each	Report	B Sheehan 0–5 (2f, 1 '45'), K Donaghy 1–2, C Cooper (1f), T Walsh 0–2 each, A O'Mahony, S Scanlon 0–1 each

=== All-Ireland series ===
This stage of the competition is a pure knockout, with teams competing facing off in a single match. The draw for the quarter-finals took place on August 3, and it involved the four winning teams from round 3 of the qualifier series being drawn against the four provincial winners; Galway, Cork, Dublin and Armagh.

Quarter-finals
Galway	1–16
Kerry	1–21
Cork	2–11
Kildare	1–11
Dublin	1–08
Tyrone	3–14
Armagh	0–12
Wexford	1–14

Semi-finals
Kerry	3–14
Cork	2–13
Tyrone	0–23
Wexford	1–14

Final
Kerry	0–14
Tyrone	1–15

==== Quarter-finals ====
9 August 2008
Quarter-final

Armagh	0–12 – 1–14	Wexford
A Kernan 0–4 (3f), R Clarke, S McDonnell 0–3 each, B Mallon, C Vernon 0–1	Report	M Forde 1–5 (1f, 1sl), C Lyng 0–5 (3f), R Barry 0–2, PJ Banville, B Doyle 0–1 each

Croke Park, Dublin

9 August 2008
Quarter-final

Galway	1–16 – 1–21	Kerry
M Meehan 0–10 (4f), J Bergin 1–1, M Lydon, C Bane, G Bradshaw, P Joyce, M Clancy 0–1 each	Report	B Sheehan 0–7 (4f), Declan O'Sullivan 0–4, D Walsh 1–0, C Cooper (1f), T Walsh 0–3 each, A O'Mahony, K Donaghy, Darren O'Sullivan, D O'Se 0–1 each

Croke Park, Dublin

10 August 2008
Quarter-final

Cork	2–11 – 1–11	Kildare
J Hayes 1–3, M Cussen 1–2, D Goulding 0–3 (2f), P O'Neill 0–2, J Masters 0–1	Report	J Doyle 1–5 (4f), A Smyth 0–3, D Earley, E Callaghan, M Conway (1f) 0–1 each

Croke Park, Dublin

16 August 2008
Quarter-final

Dublin	1–08 – 3–14	Tyrone
C Keaney 1–1, B Brogan 0–3, T Quinn 0–2 (2f), B Cahill, M Vaughan (1f) 0–1 each	Report	S Cavanagh 1–2 (1f), J McMahon, D Harte 1–1 each, B Dooher, C McCullagh 0–3 each, T McGuigan, C Gormley, B McGuigan, E McGinley 0–1 each

Croke Park, Dublin

==== Semi-finals ====
24 August 2008
Semi-final

Kerry	1–13 – 3–07	Cork
K Donaghy 1–1, B Sheehan 0–4 (3f), C Cooper 0–3 (2f), T Walsh 0–2, T O’Sé, E Brosnan, D O’Sullivan 0–1 each D O'Se SO	Report	J Hayes 1–1 (1f), D O’Connor 0–4 (2f), D Goulding, J Masters 1–0 each, N Murphy, J Miskella 0–1 each D O'Connor SO

Croke Park, Dublin

31 August 2008
Semi-final Replay

Kerry	3–14 – 2–13	Cork
C Cooper 1–8 (6f), T Walsh 1–2, Declan O'Sullivan 1–0, S Scanlon 0–2, T O'Se, E Brosnan 0–1 each	Report	D Goulding 1–7 (5f), D O'Connor 0–4 (2f), P O'Neill 1–0, J Miskella, J Masters 0–1 each

Croke Park, Dublin

31 August 2008
Semi-final

Wexford	1–14 – 0–23	Tyrone
C Lyng 1–6 (3f), C Morris 0–2, A Morrissey, P Wallace, PJ Banville, S Roche, P Colfer, A Flynn 0–1 each	Report	S Cavanagh, C McCullagh 0–4 (2f) each, M Penrose, T McGuigan (1f), B Dooher 0–3 each, P Jordan, R McMenamin 0–2 each, E McGinley, D Harte 0–1 each

Croke Park, Dublin

==== Final ====
21 September 2008
Final

Kerry	0–14 – 1–15	Tyrone
C Cooper 0–6 (3f), B Sheehan 0–2 (2f), Declan O'Sullivan 0–2, T Walsh, Darren O'Sullivan, T Ó Sé, D Ó Sé 0–1 each	Report	S Cavanagh 0–5, T McGuigan 1–1 (1f), B Dooher 0–2, C McCullagh 0–1 (1f), D Harte, E McGinley, M Penrose, R Mellon, K Hughes, C Cavanagh 0–1 each

Croke Park, Dublin
Attendance: 82,203 (1)
Referee: Maurice Deegan (Laois)

== Championship statistics ==
=== Miscellaneous ===
- Fermanagh reached Ulster final for the first time since 1982.
- Wexford reached the Leinster final for the first time since 1956 and the All Ireland semi-final for the first time since 1945.
- The Munster football championship was seeded for the first time since 1990 lasted 1 year the system was repeated in 2014.
- This was the first time that neither All Ireland finalist won their provincial championship since the introduction of the back door.

=== Top scorers ===
Season

Player	County	Tally	Total	Matches	Average
John Doyle	Kildare	2–26	32	5	6.4
Colm Cooper	Kerry	2–25	31	7	4.43
Seán Cavanagh	Tyrone	2–24	30	8	3.75
Ian Ryan	Limerick	3–20	29	4	7.25
Mattie Forde	Wexford	1–24	27	6	4.5
Ciarán Lyng	Wexford	2–21	27	6	4.5

Single game

Player	County	Tally	Opposition
Ian Ryan	Limerick	3-07	Meath
Mark Brehony	Sligo	1–11	London
Colm Cooper	Kerry	1-08	Cork
Michael Meehan	Galway	0–10	Kerry
Emlyn Mulligan	Leitrim	0–10	Galway
Paddy Bradley	Derry	0–10	Donegal

=== Discipline ===
Team	Red Cards	Players
Kerry	4	Paul Galvin, Marc Ó Sé (later rescinded), Darragh Ó Sé (twice)
Cork	2	N Murphy, D O'Connor (later rescinded)
Westmeath	2	D Healy, D Harte
Roscommon	1	G Cox
Tipperary	1	A Foley
Waterford	1	J Walsh
Meath	1	M Ward
Offaly	1	S Sullivan
Monaghan	1	G McQuaid
Down	1	Dan Gordon (later rescinded)

== Roll of Honour ==
- Kerry – 35 (2007)
- Dublin – 22 (1995)
- Galway – 9 (2001)
- Meath – 7 (1999)
- Cork – 6 (1990)
- Down – 5 (1994)
- Wexford – 5 (1918)
- Cavan – 5 (1952)
- Kildare – 4 (1928)
- Tipperary – 4 (1920)
- Tyrone – 3 (2008)
- Offaly – 3 (1982)
- Louth – 3 (1957)
- Mayo – 3 (1951)
- Roscommon – 2 (1944)
- Limerick – 2 (1896)
- Donegal – 1 (1992)
- Derry – 1 (1993)
- Armagh – 1 (2002)

== See also ==
- 2008 All-Ireland Senior Hurling Championship
