= 2008 Tommy Murphy Cup =

The fifth Tommy Murphy Cup Gaelic football competition commenced on July 12, 2008. The competition was in knockout format: the nine teams who play in the National Football League 2009 Division 4 competed.

Antrim beat holders Wicklow in the final.

== Format ==
- The cup was straight knockout

== Teams ==
- Antrim
- Clare
- Carlow
- Kilkenny
- Leitrim
- London
- Sligo
- Waterford
- Wicklow

== Preliminary round ==
=== Match ===
Date	Team	Score	Team	Score	Venue
July 12	Kilkenny	0-08	London	4-13	Freshford

== Quarter-finals ==
=== Matches ===
Date	Team	Score	Team	Score	Venue
July 19	London	3-14	Sligo	2-12	Ruislip
July 19	Antrim	1-10	Carlow	0-11	Casement Park
July 19	Clare	1-08	Leitrim	1-12	Cusack Park
July 19	Wicklow	0-18	Waterford	0-12	Aughrim Park

== Semi-finals ==
=== Matches ===
Date	Team	Score	Team	Score	Venue
July 26	Antrim	1-19	London	0-13	Casement Park
July 26	Wicklow	0-15	Leitrim	0-12	Aughrim Park

== Final ==
=== Match ===
Date	Team	Score	Team	Score	Venue
August 2	Antrim	3-12	Wicklow	1-15	Croke Park

== See also ==
- 2008 All-Ireland Senior Football Championship
