= 2009 Ulster Senior Football Championship =

Championship venues

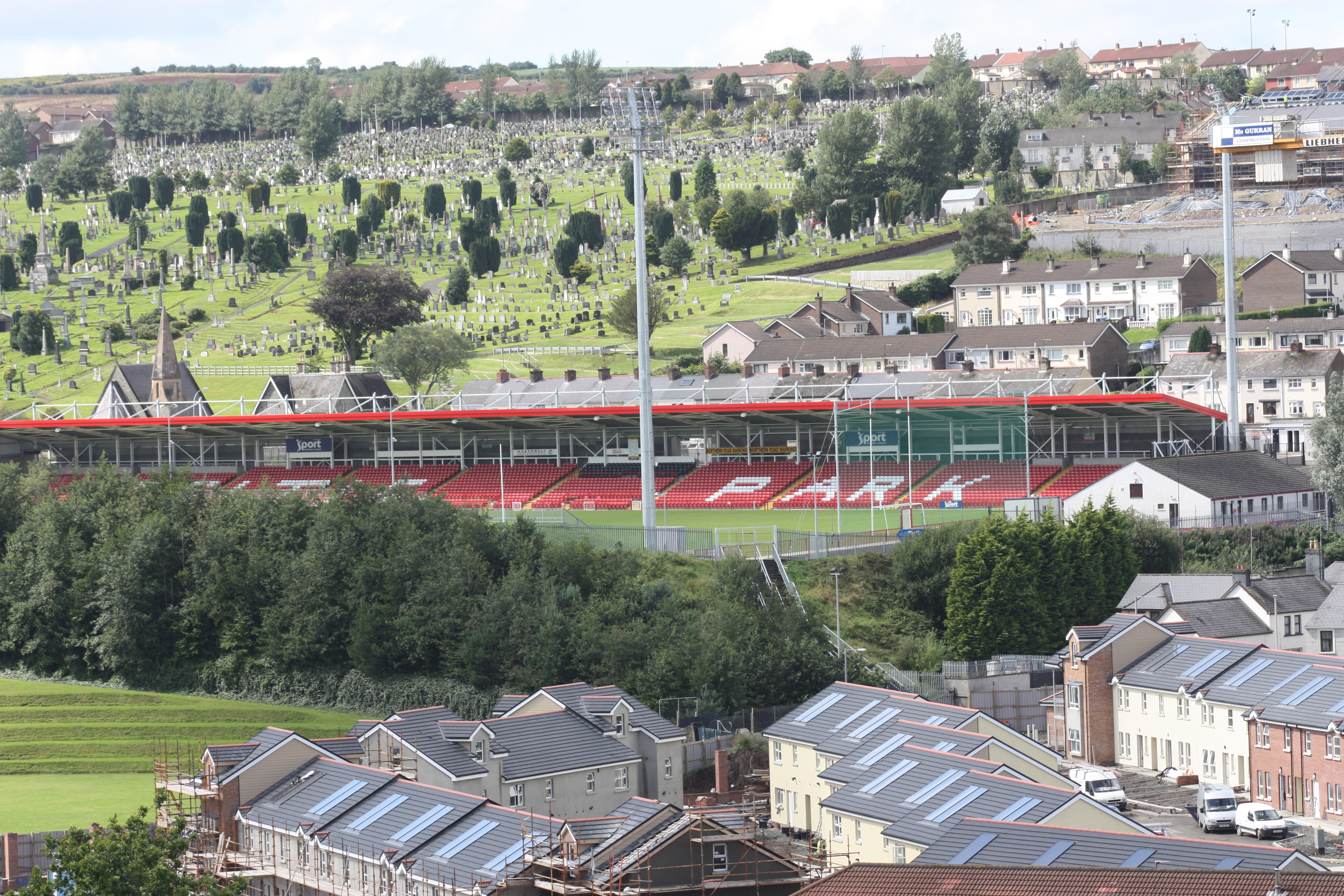
Celtic Park in the City of Derry

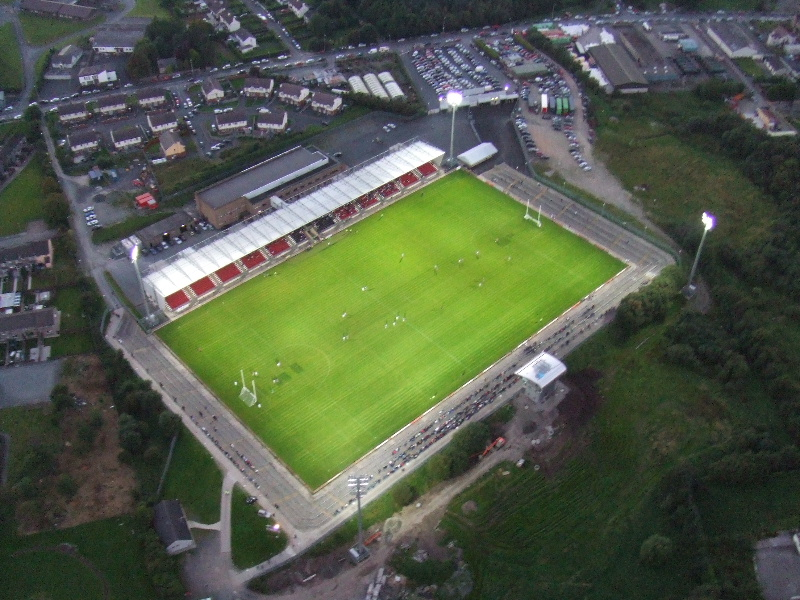
Healy Park in Omagh

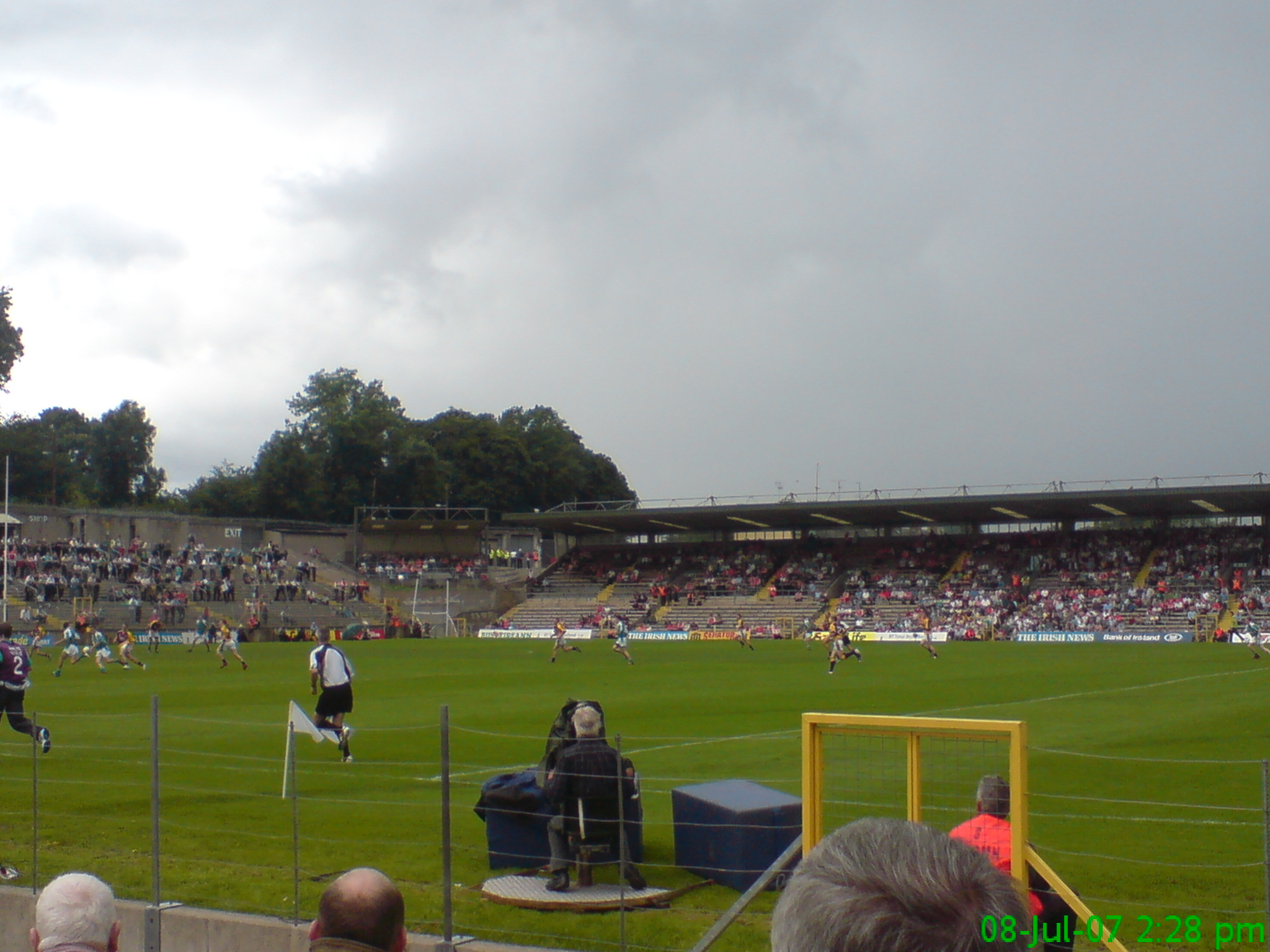
St Tiernach's Park in Clones

and others elsewhere...

The 2009 Ulster Senior Football Championship was the 121st installment of the annual Ulster Senior Football Championship held under the auspices of the Ulster GAA. It was won by Tyrone who defeated Antrim in the final. Antrim were appearing in their first final since 1970. The winning Tyrone team received the Anglo-Celt Cup, and automatically advanced to the quarter-final stage of the 2009 All-Ireland Senior Football Championship.

Teams who lost at the preliminary round, quarter-final or semi-final stages entered Round 1 of the All-Ireland Qualifiers. The beaten Ulster finalists entered at Round 3. Successfully advancing through the Qualifiers allowed a team to reach the All-Ireland quarter-finals.

The draw for the 2009 Ulster Senior Football Championship was made along with the other three provincial draws on 8 October 2008 at Croke Park in Dublin.

== Bracket ==
Preliminary round
Fermanagh	0–13
Down	0–10

Quarter-finals
Derry	1–10
Monaghan	0–10
Tyrone	2–10
Armagh	1–10
Donegal	0–12
Antrim	1–10
Cavan	0–13
Fermanagh	1–09

Semi-finals
Derry	0–07
Tyrone	0–15
Antrim	0–13
Cavan	1–07

Final
Tyrone	1–18
Antrim	0–15

- Source: Ulster GAA Council

== Preliminary round ==
17 May 2009
3.30pm

Fermanagh	–	Down
0–13		0–10

Brewster Park, Enniskillen
Referee: John Bannon (Longford)

== Quarter-finals ==
24 May 2009
2.00pm

Derry	–	Monaghan
1–10		0–10

Celtic Park, Derry
Referee: J White (Donegal)
31 May 2009
2.00pm

Tyrone	–	Armagh
2–10		1–10

St Tiernach's Park, Clones
Referee: Pat McEnaney (Monaghan)
6 June 2009
7.00pm

Cavan	–	Fermanagh
0–13		1-09

Breffni Park, Cavan
Referee: R Hickey (Clare)
14 June 2009
3.30pm

Donegal	–	Antrim
0–12		1–10

MacCumhaill Park, Ballybofey
Referee: P Hughes (Armagh)

== Semi-finals ==
21 June 2009
2.00pm

Derry	–	Tyrone
0-07		0–15

Casement Park, Belfast
Referee: G O Conamha (Galway)
27 June 2009
7.00pm

Cavan	–	Antrim
1-07		0–13

St Tiernach's Park, Clones
Referee: J Bannon (Longford)

== Final ==
19 July 2009
2.00pm

Tyrone	–	Antrim
1–18		0–15

St Tiernach's Park, Clones
Referee: P Hughes (Armagh)
