= Ulster Senior Football Championship =

Annual Gaelic football competition

- Current season or competition: 2026 Ulster Senior Football Championship
- Code: Gaelic football
- Founded: 1888
- Region: Ulster (GAA)
- Trophy: Anglo-Celt Cup
- No. of teams: 9
- Title holders: Armagh (15th title)
- Most titles: Cavan (40 titles)
- Sponsors: SuperValu; Allianz; AIB

The Ulster Senior Football Championship is an inter-county competition for Gaelic football teams in the Irish province of Ulster. It is organised by the Ulster Council of the Gaelic Athletic Association (GAA) and begins in April. Since 2022 the final has been played in May. Until 2018, the year it moved to June, the final was usually traditionally played on the third Sunday in July.

All nine Ulster counties participate. It is regarded as the hardest to win of the four provincial football championships. At a referee conference in January 2015, David Coldrick said about officiating in the competition: "Ulster makes or breaks you. It can be a graveyard. The games are different. There is an extra dimension and intensity, and you must be at your best. If you aren't prepared physically and mentally, the chances are you will be caught out. But when you are appointed for your first Ulster championship match, that's making progress".

The winners receive the Anglo-Celt Cup, which was presented to the Ulster Council in 1925 by John F. O'Hanlon, who was editor of The Anglo-Celt newspaper based in Cavan.

Cavan have won the most championships (40). Armagh are the title holders, defeating Monaghan after extra-time in the 2026 final.

== History ==
Following the founding of the GAA in 1884, the first Ulster Senior Football Championship was played in 1888, when Red Hand of Monaghan played Mocha Finn's of Cavan at Bryanstown. Monaghan were the first ever Ulster Champions following a 0–3 to 0–2 win after a replay.

Cavan are the most successful team in Ulster SFC history, having won the competition on 40 occasions. Cavan maintain the record for consecutive appearances in Ulster Finals. During the 1930s and 1940s, they appeared in and won seven consecutive Ulster SFC titles. Fermanagh remain the only team not to have won an Ulster SFC title. The Ulster Senior Football Championship celebrated its 125th year in 2013.

For many decades, winning the Ulster Senior Football Championship was considered as much as a team from Ulster could hope for, as the other provinces were usually much stronger and more competitive.

Before 1990, only Cavan in 1933, 1935, 1947, 1948 and 1952, and Down in 1960, 1961 and 1968, had won the All-Ireland Senior Football Championship title. In the 1990s however, a significant sea change took place, as the Ulster Champions won the All-Ireland in four consecutive years from 1991 to 1994. Since then Ulster has produced more All-Ireland winning teams than any other province.

Currently the Ulster Senior Football Championship is considered one of the toughest provinces to compete in. Ulster teams have gained considerable dominance on the All-Ireland scene, having won three All-Irelands from four in the early 2000s, including in 2003 when for the first time ever, the All-Ireland football final was competed for by two teams from one province.

Before 2022, when the GAA moved the inter-county schedule ahead in the calendar to improve player welfare, the Ulster SFC final was traditionally played on the third Sunday in July, usually at St Tiernach's Park in Clones. From 2004 until 2006, it was staged at Croke Park in Dublin to accommodate expected large crowds. The 2007 final—contested by Monaghan and Tyrone—marked a return to Clones, with Tyrone emerging victorious. The Athletic Grounds in Armagh hosted the 2020 final, as the fixture was played behind closed doors due to the impact of the COVID-19 pandemic on Gaelic games. The final was last played in Belfast in 1971.

In the 2000s, Armagh were a dominant force in Ulster, winning six titles in eight years between 1999 and 2006. Donegal won consecutive Ulster SFC titles from the preliminary round in 2011 and 2012 (a feat achieved by no other county) and added the All-Ireland Senior Football Championship in 2012.

The 2019 final had the highest score for the winning team in the final (Donegal that year) since 1933 when Cavan won, and the second highest score ever. It also had the highest Ulster SFC final score for the losing team ever (Cavan on this occasion).

== Format ==
=== Overview ===
The Ulster Senior Football Championship is a single elimination tournament. Each team is afforded only one defeat before being eliminated from the championship. Pairings for matches are drawn at random and there is currently no seeding. Each match is played as a single leg. If a match is drawn there is a period of extra time, however, if both sides are still level at the end of extra time a replay takes place and so on until a winner is found.

==== Qualification for subsequent competitions ====
- The winner and runner-up of the championship qualify for the All-Ireland Senior Football Championship group stage. The remaining seven Ulster teams may also qualify for the All-Ireland SFC group stage via the National Football League. Those who fail to do so qualify for the Tailteann Cup.
- Note: Before the introduction of the qualifiers in 2001, the winners of the Ulster SFC went straight to the semi-final stage of the All-Ireland Senior Football Championship, along with the winners of the Leinster, Munster and Connacht Championships.
- Teams who are drawn to play in the preliminary round in a given year will receive an automatic bye to the quarter-final stage for the following two seasons.

=== Progression ===
| | Teams entering in this round | Teams advancing from previous round |
|---|---|---|
| Preliminary round (2 teams) | Two teams drawn at random | |
| Quarter-finals (8 teams) | Seven teams drawn at random | Winner from the preliminary-round |
| Semi-finals (4 teams) | | 4 winners from the quarter-finals |
| Final (2 teams) | | 2 winners from the semi-finals |

== Teams ==
The province of Ulster is located in the north of Ireland.

The Ulster SFC is contested by the nine traditional counties in the Irish province of Ulster. The province comprises the six counties of Northern Ireland, plus the counties of Cavan, Donegal and Monaghan in the Republic of Ireland. It is the only provincial football championship with any participating teams from Northern Ireland.

=== 2026 Championship ===
Nine counties will compete in the 2026 Ulster Senior Football Championship:

| County team | Location | Stadium | Position in 2026 Championship | Ulster SFC titles | Last Ulster SFC title | All-Ireland SFC titles | Last All-Ireland SFC title |
|---|---|---|---|---|---|---|---|
| Antrim | Belfast | Corrigan Park | Quarter-finalist | 10 | 1951 | 0 | —N/a |
| Armagh | Armagh | Athletic Grounds | Winner | 15 | 2026 | 2 | 2024 |
| Cavan | Cavan | Breffni Park | Quarter-finalist | 40 | 2020 | 5 | 1952 |
| Derry | Derry | Celtic Park | Semi-finalist | 9 | 2023 | 1 | 1993 |
| Donegal | Ballybofey | MacCumhaill Park | Quarter-finalist | 12 | 2025 | 2 | 2012 |
| Down | Newry | Páirc Esler | Semi-finalist | 12 | 1994 | 5 | 1994 |
| Fermanagh | Enniskillen | Brewster Park | Quarter-finalist | 0 | —N/a | 0 | —N/a |
| Monaghan | Clones | St Tiernach's Park | Finalist | 16 | 2015 | 0 | —N/a |
| Tyrone | Omagh | Healy Park | Preliminary round | 16 | 2021 | 4 | 2021 |

=== Personnel and kits ===
| County team | Manager | Captain(s) | Sponsor(s) |
|---|---|---|---|
| Antrim | Vacant | | Fibrus |
| Armagh | Kieran McGeeney | Aidan Forker | Simply Fruit |
| Cavan | Raymond Galligan | Padraig Faulkner & Ciarán Brady | Kingspan Group |
| Derry | Ciarán Meenagh | Conor Glass | Errigal Contracts |
| Donegal | Jim McGuinness | Paddy McBrearty | Circet |
| Down | Conor Laverty | Pierce Laverty | EOS IT Solutions |
| Fermanagh | Kieran Donnelly | Eoin Donnelly | Tracey Concrete |
| Monaghan | Gabriel Bannigan | Micheál Bannigan | All Boro Floor Services |
| Tyrone | Malachy O'Rourke | Brian Kennedy | McAleer & Rushe Ltd |

== List of finals ==
| Year | Date | Winner | | Runner-up | | Venue | Winning captain | Winning margin |
| Year | Date | County team | Score | County team | Score | Venue | Winning captain | Winning margin |
|---|---|---|---|---|---|---|---|---|
| 1887 | | No championship | | | | | | |
| 1888 | 19 August; 9 September | Monaghan | 0-2, 0-3 (R) | Cavan | 0-2, 0-1 (R) | Drogheda; Bryanstown | | 2 |
| 1889 | | No championship | | | | | | |
| 1890 | 12 October | Armagh | 2-8 | Tyrone | 1-2 | Lisburn | | 9 |
| 1891 | 1 November; 6 December | Cavan | 0-7; 1-11 (R) | Armagh | 0-1; 0-0 (R) | Bailieboro; Smithborough | | 14 |
| 1892–1900 | | No championship | | | | | | |
| 1901 | 29 March 1903 | Antrim | 3-5 | Armagh | 2-5 | | | 3 |
| 1902 | 3 April 1904 | Armagh | 2-2 | Antrim | 1-4 | Belfast | | 1 |
| 1903 | 23 April 1905; 28 May 1905; 11 June 1905 | Cavan | 0-5, 0-5 (R1), 0-8 (R2) | Armagh | 0-5, 0-5 (R1), 0-4 (R2) | Armagh; Cavan; Newbliss | | 4 |
| 1904 | | Cavan | 0-5; 0-8 (R) | Armagh | 0-5; 0-4 (R) | Cavan; Newbliss | | 4 |
| 1905 | | Cavan | 0-7 | Monaghan | 0-3 | | | 4 |
| 1906 | 15 September 1907 | Monaghan | 2-10 | Antrim | 1-2 | Clones | | 11 |
| 1907 | 13 September 1908 | Cavan | 1-8 | Antrim | 0-4 | Clones | | 7 |
| 1908 | 1 November; 13 December | Antrim | 1-8 | Cavan | 0-4 | Castleblaney; Newbliss | | 7 |
| 1909 | 28 November | Antrim | 1-9 | Cavan | 0-5 | Clones | | 7 |
| 1910 | 18 June 1911 | Antrim | 3-4 | Cavan | 0-1 | Athletic Grounds, Dundalk | | 12 |
| 1911 | | Antrim | 2-8 | Cavan | 0-4 | | H Sheehan | 10 |
| 1912 | 10 November | Antrim | 2-2 | Armagh | 0-1 | Castleblaney | John Coburn | 7 |
| 1913 | 21 September | Antrim | 2-1 | Monaghan | 1-2 | Newbliss | | 2 |
| 1914 | 9 August | Monaghan | 2-4 | Fermanagh | 0-2 | Newbliss | | 10 |
| 1915 | 22 August; 5 September | Cavan | 3-2, 0-4 (R) | Monaghan | 2-5, 0-3 (R) | Clones; Belturbet | | 1 |
| 1916 | 24 September | Monaghan | 2-3 | Cavan | 0-2 | Clones | | 7 |
| 1917 | 28 October | Monaghan | 4-2 | Armagh | 0-4 | Clones | | 14 |
| 1918 | 15 September | Cavan | 3-2 | Antrim | 0-0 | Belturbet | | 11 |
| 1919 | 31 August | Cavan | 5-6 | Antrim | 0-2 | Clones | | 19 |
| 1920 | 8 August | Cavan | 4-6 | Armagh | 1-4 | Cootehill | | 11 |
| 1921 | 28 October 1923 | Monaghan | 2-2 | Derry | 1-1 | Clones | | 4 |
| 1922 (Note: Ulster GAA gives the 1922 title to both Cavan and Monaghan.) | 22 April 1923; 20 May 1923 | Monaghan | 2-3, 3-4 (R) | Cavan | 2-3, 3-3 (R) | Clones; Belturbet | | 1 |
| 1923 | 2 September | Cavan | 5-10 | Monaghan | 1-1 | Cavan | | 18 |
| 1924 | 21 September; 2 November | Cavan | 1-3, 2-3 (R) | Monaghan | 0-6, 1-3 (R) | Belturbet; Ballybay | | 3 |
| 1925 | 2 August; 16 August | Cavan | 2-3, 3-6 (R) | Antrim | 3-0, 0-1 (R) | Monaghan; Belturbet | | 14 |
| 1926 | 22 August | Cavan | 5-3 | Antrim | 0-6 | Breffni Park | | 9 |
| 1927 | 31 July | Monaghan | 3-5 | Armagh | 2-5 | Athletic Grounds | | 3 |
| 1928 | 29 July | Cavan | 2-6 | Armagh | 1-4 | Breffni Park | Jim Smith | 2 |
| 1929 | 28 July; 11 August | Monaghan | 1-4, 1-10 (R) | Cavan | 1-4, 0-7 (R) | Breffni Park; Carrickmacross | | 6 |
| 1930 | 27 July | Monaghan | 4-3 | Cavan | 1-5 | Carrickmacross | Paddy Kilroy | 4 |
| 1931 | 9 August | Cavan | 0-8 | Armagh | 2-1 | Athletic Grounds, Dundalk | | 4 |
| 1932 | 19 June | Cavan | 2-4 | Armagh | 0-2 | Monaghan | | 8 |
| 1933 | 6 August | Cavan | 6-13 | Tyrone | 1-2 | Breffni Park | Jim Smith | 14 |
| 1934 | 29 July | Cavan | 3-8 | Armagh | 0-2 | St. Mary's Park | | 15 |
| 1935 | 28 July | Cavan | 2-6 | Fermanagh | 2-1 | Belturbet | Hughie O'Reilly | 5 |
| 1936 | 9 August | Cavan | 1-7 | Monaghan | 0-7 | St. Mary's Park | | 3 |
| 1937 | 25 July | Cavan | 0-13 | Armagh | 0-3 | St. Mary's Park | Tom O'Reilly | 10 |
| 1938 | 31 July | Monaghan | 2-5 | Armagh | 2-2 | Athletic Grounds | | 3 |
| 1939 | 6 August; 15 August | Cavan | 2-3, 2-3 (R)* | Armagh | 1-3, 1-4 (R) | St. Mary's Park; Croke Park | | 3 |
| 1940 | 28 July | Cavan | 4-10 | Down | 1-5 | Breffni Park | | 14 |
| 1941 | 3 August | Cavan | 3-9 | Tyrone | 0-5 | Athletic Grounds | | 9 |
| 1942 | 19 July | Cavan | 5-11 | Down | 1-3 | Athletic Grounds, Dundalk | | 20 |
| 1943 | 25 July | Cavan | 2-3 | Monaghan | 0-5 | St Tiernach's Park | Tom O'Reilly | 4 |
| 1944 | 30 July | Cavan | 1-9 | Monaghan | 1-6 | St Tiernach's Park | | 3 |
| 1945 | 29 July | Cavan | 4-10 | Fermanagh | 1-4 | St Tiernach's Park | Tom O'Reilly | 18 |
| 1946 | 21 July | Antrim | 2-8 | Cavan | 1-7 | St Tiernach's Park | | 4 |
| 1947 | 20 July | Cavan | 3-4 | Antrim | 1-6 | St Tiernach's Park | John Joe O’Reilly | 4 |
| 1948 | 25 July | Cavan | 2-12 | Antrim | 2-4 | St Tiernach's Park | John Joe O’Reilly | 8 |
| 1949 | 31 July | Cavan | 1-7 | Armagh | 1-6 | St Tiernach's Park | John Joe O’Reilly | 1 |
| 1950 | 23 July | Armagh | 1-11 | Cavan | 1-7 | St Tiernach's Park | | 4 |
| 1951 | 29 July | Antrim | 1-7 | Cavan | 2-3 | St Tiernach's Park | | 1 |
| 1952 | 27 July | Cavan | 1-8 | Monaghan | 0-8 | Breffni Park | Mick Higgins | 3 |
| 1953 | 26 July | Armagh | 1-6 | Cavan | 0-5 | Casement Park | Seán Quinn | 4 |
| 1954 | 25 July | Cavan | 2-10 | Armagh | 2-5 | St Tiernach's Park | | 5 |
| 1955 | 31 July | Cavan | 0-11 | Derry | 0-8 | St Tiernach's Park | | 3 |
| 1956 | 29 July | Tyrone | 3-5 | Cavan | 0-4 | St Tiernach's Park | | 10 |
| 1957 | 28 July | Tyrone | 1-9 | Derry | 0-10 | St Tiernach's Park | | 2 |
| 1958 | 27 July | Derry | 1-11 | Down | 2-4 | St Tiernach's Park | Jim McKeever | 4 |
| 1959 | 9 August | Down | 2-16 | Cavan | 0-7 | St Tiernach's Park | | 15 |
| 1960 | 31 July | Down | 3-7 | Cavan | 1-8 | St Tiernach's Park | Kevin Mussen | 5 |
| 1961 | 23 July | Down | 2-10 | Armagh | 1-10 | Casement Park | Paddy Doherty | 3 |
| 1962 | 29 July | Cavan | 3-6 | Down | 0-5 | Casement Park | | 10 |
| 1963 | 28 July | Down | 2-11 | Donegal | 1-4 | Breffni Park | | 10 |
| 1964 | 19 July | Cavan | 2-10 | Down | 1-10 | Casement Park | | 3 |
| 1965 | 1 August | Down | 3-5 | Cavan | 1-8 | Casement Park | | 3 |
| 1966 | 24 July | Down | 1-7 | Donegal | 0-8 | Casement Park | | 2 |
| 1967 | 23 July | Cavan | 2-12 | Down | 0-8 | St Tiernach's Park | | 10 |
| 1968 | 28 July | Down | 0-16 | Cavan | 1-8 | Casement Park | Joe Lennon | 5 |
| 1969 | 27 July | Cavan | 2-13 | Down | 2-6 | Casement Park | | 7 |
| 1970 | 26 July | Derry | 2-13 | Antrim | 1-12 | St Tiernach's Park | | 4 |
| 1971 | 25 July | Down | 4-15 | Derry | 4-11 | Casement Park | | 4 |
| 1972 | 30 July | Donegal | 2-13 | Tyrone | 1-11 | St Tiernach's Park | | 8 |
| 1973 | 29 July | Tyrone | 3-13 | Down | 1-11 | St Tiernach's Park | | 8 |
| 1974 | 28 July; 4 August | Donegal | 1-14, 3-9 (R) | Down | 2-11, 1-12 (R) | St Tiernach's Park | | 3(R) |
| 1975 | 27 July | Derry | 1-16 | Down | 2-6 | St Tiernach's Park | | 7 |
| 1976 | 18 July; 25 July | Derry | 1-8, 0-22 (R) | Cavan | 1-8, 1-16 (R) | St Tiernach's Park | | 3(R) |
| 1977 | 24 July | Armagh | 3-10 | Derry | 1-5 | St Tiernach's Park | Jimmy Smyth | 11 |
| 1978 | 23 July | Down | 2-19 | Cavan | 2-12 | St Tiernach's Park | | 7 |
| 1979 | 22 July | Monaghan | 1-15 | Donegal | 0-11 | St Tiernach's Park | | 4 |
| 1980 | 20 July | Armagh | 4-10 | Tyrone | 4-7 | St Tiernach's Park | | 3 |
| 1981 | 19 July | Down | 3-12 | Armagh | 1-10 | St Tiernach's Park | | 8 |
| 1982 | 18 July | Armagh | 0-10 | Fermanagh | 1-4 | St Tiernach's Park | | 3 |
| 1983 | 24 July | Donegal | 1-14 | Cavan | 1-11 | St Tiernach's Park | | 3 |
| 1984 | 15 July | Tyrone | 0-15 | Armagh | 1-7 | St Tiernach's Park | | 5 |
| 1985 | 21 July | Monaghan | 2-9 | Derry | 0-8 | St Tiernach's Park | | 7 |
| 1986 | 20 July | Tyrone | 1-11 | Down | 0-10 | St Tiernach's Park | Eugene McKenna | 4 |
| 1987 | 19 July | Derry | 0-11 | Armagh | 0-9 | St Tiernach's Park | Plunkett Murphy | 2 |
| 1988 | 17 July | Monaghan | 1-10 | Tyrone | 0-11 | St Tiernach's Park | | 3 |
| 1989 | 16 July; 23 July | Tyrone | 0-11, 2-13 (R) | Donegal | 0-11, 0-7 (R) | St Tiernach's Park | | 12(R) |
| 1990 | 15 July | Donegal | 0-15 | Armagh | 0-14 | St Tiernach's Park | Anthony Molloy | 1 |
| 1991 | 28 July | Down | 1-15 | Donegal | 0-10 | St Tiernach's Park | Paddy O'Rourke | 8 |
| 1992 | 19 July | Donegal | 0-14 | Derry | 1-9 | St Tiernach's Park | Anthony Molloy | 2 |
| 1993 | 18 July | Derry | 0-8 | Donegal | 0-6 | St Tiernach's Park | Henry Downey | 2 |
| 1994 | 17 July | Down | 1-17 | Tyrone | 1-11 | St Tiernach's Park | D. J. Kane | 6 |
| 1995 | 23 July | Tyrone | 2-13 | Cavan | 0-10 | St Tiernach's Park | Ciarán Corr | 9 |
| 1996 | 28 July | Tyrone | 1-9 | Down | 0-9 | St Tiernach's Park | | 3 |
| 1997 | 20 July | Cavan | 1-14 | Derry | 0-16 | St Tiernach's Park | Stephen King | 1 |
| 1998 | 19 July | Derry | 1-7 | Donegal | 0-8 | St Tiernach's Park | Kieran McKeever | 2 |
| 1999 | 1 August | Armagh | 3-12 | Down | 0-10 | St Tiernach's Park | Jarlath Burns | 11 |
| 2000 | 16 July | Armagh | 1-12 | Derry | 1-11 | St Tiernach's Park | Kieran McGeeney | 1 |
| 2001 | 8 July | Tyrone | 1-13 | Cavan | 1-11 | St Tiernach's Park | Sean Teague | 2 |
| 2002 | 7 July | Armagh | 1-14 | Donegal | 1-10 | St Tiernach's Park | Kieran McGeeney | 4 |
| 2003 | 13 July; 20 July | Tyrone | 1-17, 0-23 (R) | Down | 4-8, 1-5 (R) | St Tiernach's Park | Peter Canavan | 15 (R) |
| 2004 | 11 July | Armagh | 3-15 | Donegal | 0-11 | Croke Park | Kieran McGeeney | 13 |
| 2005 | 10 July; 23 July | Armagh | 2-8, 0-13 (R) | Tyrone | 0-14, 0-11 (R) | Croke Park | Kieran McGeeney | 2 (R) |
| 2006 | 9 July | Armagh | 1-9 | Donegal | 0-9 | Croke Park | Paul McGrane | 3 |
| 2007 | 15 July | Tyrone | 1-15 | Monaghan | 1-13 | St Tiernach's Park | Brian Dooher | 2 |
| 2008 | 20 July; 27 July | Armagh | 2-8, 1-11 (R) | Fermanagh | 1-11, 0-8 (R) | St Tiernach's Park | Paul McGrane | 6 (R) |
| 2009 | 19 July | Tyrone | 1-18 | Antrim | 0-15 | St Tiernach's Park | | 6 |
| 2010 | 18 July | Tyrone | 1-14 | Monaghan | 0-7 | St Tiernach's Park | | 10 |
| 2011 | 17 July | Donegal | 1-11 | Derry | 0-8 | St Tiernach's Park | Michael Murphy | 6 |
| 2012 | 22 July | Donegal | 2-18 | Down | 0-13 | St Tiernach's Park | Michael Murphy | 11 |
| 2013 | 21 July | Monaghan | 0-13 | Donegal | 0-7 | St Tiernach's Park | Owen Lennon | 6 |
| 2014 | 20 July | Donegal | 0-15 | Monaghan | 1-9 | St Tiernach's Park | Michael Murphy | 3 |
| 2015 | 19 July | Monaghan | 0-11 | Donegal | 0-10 | St Tiernach's Park | Conor McManus | 1 |
| 2016 | 17 July | Tyrone | 0-13 | Donegal | 0-11 | St Tiernach's Park | Seán Cavanagh | 2 |
| 2017 | 16 July | Tyrone | 2-17 | Down | 0-15 | St Tiernach's Park | Seán Cavanagh | 8 |
| 2018 | 24 June | Donegal | 2-18 | Fermanagh | 0-12 | St Tiernach's Park | Michael Murphy | 12 |
| 2019 | 23 June | Donegal | 1-24 | Cavan | 2-16 | St Tiernach's Park | Michael Murphy | 8 |
| 2020 | 22 November | Cavan | 1-13 | Donegal | 0-12 | Athletic Grounds | Raymond Galligan | 4 |
| 2021 | 31 July | Tyrone | 0-16 | Monaghan | 0-15 | Croke Park | Pádraig Hampsey | 1 |
| 2022 | 29 May | Derry | 1-16 | Donegal | 1-14 | St Tiernach's Park | Chrissy McKaigue | 2 |
| 2023 | 14 May | Derry | 1-15 (a.e.t.) (3–1 p) | Armagh | 0-18 (a.e.t.) (3–1 p) | St Tiernach's Park | Conor Glass | Penalties |
| 2024 | 12 May | Donegal | 0-20 (a.e.t.) (6–5 p) | Armagh | 0-20 (a.e.t.) (6–5 p) | St Tiernach's Park | Patrick McBrearty | Penalties |
| 2025 | 10 May | Donegal | 2-23 (a.e.t.) | Armagh | 0-28 (a.e.t.) | St Tiernach's Park | Patrick McBrearty | 1 |
| 2026 | 17 May | Armagh | 2-28 (a.e.t.) | Monaghan | 0-25 (a.e.t.) | St Tiernach's Park | Aidan Forker | 9 |

Notes

- 1887 No Ulster SFC
- 1888 Ulster Senior Football Championship Inniskeen Grattans of (Monaghan) v Maghera MacFinns of (Cavan) game went to a replay.
- 1889 No Ulster SFC
- 1890 Armagh Harps, (Armagh) v Owen Roe O'Neill's (Tyrone)
- 1891 Cavan Slashers (Cavan) v Armagh Harps (Armagh) game abandoned Smithboro Co Monaghan game replayed Cavan 1-11 Armagh 0–00
- 1892–1900 No championship. Cavan played in the Leinster Senior Football Championship in 1895.
- 1900 Antrim were to have represented Ulster but gave a walkover to Galway.
- 1901–1902 the championship was played over two seasons and only counts as one Ulster SFC title.
- 1939 Game abandoned – replay ordered
- 2020 No crowd attendance due to the impact of the COVID-19 pandemic on Gaelic games

== Team records and statistics ==
=== Roll of honour ===
==== Legend ====
- Golden background – Ulster SFC winner or runner-up also won the All-Ireland SFC that year.

==== Performance by team ====
| County team | Title(s) | Runner-up | Years won | Years runner-up |
|---|---|---|---|---|
| Cavan | 40 | 23 | 1891, 1903, 1904, 1905, 1915, 1918, 1919, 1920, 1922, (Note: Ulster GAA gives the 1922 title to both Cavan and Monaghan. If removed from Cavan it would leave the county with 39 titles. But 2020 is given as the county's 40th win.) 1923, 1924, 1925, 1926, 1928, 1931, 1932, **1933**, 1934, **1935**, 1936, 1937, 1939, 1940, 1941, 1942, 1943, 1944, 1945, **1947**, **1948**, 1949, **1952**, 1954, 1955, 1962, 1964, 1967, 1969, 1997, 2020 | 1888, 1908, 1909, 1910, 1911, 1916, 1922, 1929, 1930, 1946, 1950, 1951, 1953, 1959, 1960, 1965, 1968, 1976, 1978, 1983, 1995, 2001, 2019 |
| Monaghan | 16 | 13 | 1888, 1906, 1914, 1916, 1917, 1921, 1922, (Note: Ulster GAA gives the 1922 title to both Cavan and Monaghan.) 1927, 1929, 1930, 1938, 1979, 1985, 1988, 2013, 2015 | 1905, 1913, 1923, 1924, 1936, 1943, 1944, 1952, 2007, 2010, 2014, 2021,2026 |
| Tyrone | 16 | 7 | 1956, 1957, 1973, 1984, 1986, 1989, 1995, 1996, 2001, **2003**, 2007, 2009, 2010, 2016, 2017, **2021** | 1890, 1941, 1972, 1980, 1988, 1994, **2005** |
| Armagh | 15 | 23 | 1890, 1902, 1950, 1953, 1977, 1980, 1982, 1999, 2000, **2002**, 2004, 2005, 2006, 2008, 2026 | 1891, 1901–02, 1904, 1912, 1917, 1920, 1927, 1928, 1931, 1932, 1934, 1938, 1939, 1949, 1954, 1961, 1981, 1984, 1987, 1990, 2023, **2024**, 2025 |
| Down | 12 | 15 | 1959, **1960**, **1961**, 1963, 1965, 1966, **1968**, 1971, 1978, 1981, **1991**, **1994** | 1940, 1942, 1958, 1962, 1967, 1969, 1973, 1974, 1975, 1986, 1996, 1999, 2003, 2012, 2017 |
| Donegal | 12 | 14 | 1972, 1974, 1983, 1990, **1992**, 2011, **2012**, 2014, 2018, 2019, 2024, 2025 | 1963, 1966, 1979, 1991, 1993, 1998, 2002, 2004, 2006, 2013, 2015, 2016, 2020, 2022 |
| Antrim | 10 | 9 | 1900, 1901, 1908, 1909, 1910, 1911, 1912, 1913, 1946, 1951 | 1903, 1906, 1918, 1919, 1925, 1926, 1947, 1948, 2009 |
| Derry | 9 | 10 | 1958, 1970, 1975, 1976, 1987, **1993**, 1998, 2022, 2023 | 1921, 1955, 1957, 1971, 1977, 1985, 1992, 1997, 2000, 2011 |
| Fermanagh | 0 | 6 | | 1914, 1935, 1945, 1982, 2008, 2018 |

=== Team progress: 2001–2019 ===
Below is a record of each county's performance following the introduction of the qualifier system to the All-Ireland series in 2001. Before 2001 only the Ulster SFC title winner contested the All-Ireland SFC. Qualifiers did not occur from 2020 to 2021 due to the impact of the COVID-19 pandemic on Gaelic games. They are no longer held, with weaker teams, such as Cavan, Fermanagh and Antrim, moving aside, to instead play in the Tailteann Cup.

==== Key ====
Winner
Finalist
Semi-finalist
Quarter-finalist / Super 8s
Qualifier Rounds 1–4 / Tommy Murphy Cup

| Team | 2001 | 2002 | 2003 | 2004 | 2005 | 2006 | 2007 | 2008 | 2009 | 2010 | 2011 | 2012 | 2013 | 2014 | 2015 | 2016 | 2017 | 2018 | 2019 |
|---|---|---|---|---|---|---|---|---|---|---|---|---|---|---|---|---|---|---|---|
| Antrim | Q2 | Q1 | Q2 | Q1 | Q1 | Q1 | TM | TM | Q4 | Q1 | Q3 | Q3 | Q1 | Q2 | Q2 | Q2 | Q1 | Q1 | Q2 |
| Armagh | Q3 | W | F | QF | SF | QF | Q1 | QF | Q1 | Q3 | Q3 | Q1 | Q3 | QF | Q2 | Q1 | QF | Q4 | Q3 |
| Cavan | Q4 | Q1 | Q2 | Q2 | Q4 | Q1 | Q1 | Q1 | Q2 | Q2 | Q1 | Q2 | QF | Q2 | Q2 | Q3 | Q2 | Q3 | Q4 |
| Derry | SF | Q3 | Q2 | SF | Q3 | Q3 | QF | Q1 | Q3 | Q3 | Q4 | Q1 | Q3 | Q1 | Q3 | Q4 | Q2 | Q1 | Q2 |
| Donegal | Q2 | QF | SF | Q4 | Q2 | QF | Q3 | Q2 | QF | Q1 | SF | W | QF | F | QF | QF | Q4 | S8s | S8s |
| Down | Q1 | Q1 | Q4 | Q2 | Q2 | Q1 | Q1 | Q3 | Q3 | F | Q4 | QF | Q2 | Q3 | Q1 | Q1 | Q4 | Q2 | Q2 |
| Fermanagh | Q1 | Q3 | QF | SF | Q1 | Q4 | Q2 | Q3 | Q1 | Q2 | Q1 | Q1 | Q2 | Q1 | QF | Q2 | Q1 | Q4 | Q1 |
| Monaghan | Q2 | Q1 | Q2 | Q1 | Q4 | Q2 | QF | Q4 | Q2 | Q4 | Q1 | Q2 | QF | QF | QF | Q2 | QF | SF | Q2 |
| Tyrone | QF | Q4 | W | QF | W | Q2 | QF | W | SF | QF | QF | Q3 | SF | Q2 | SF | QF | SF | F | SF |

=== By semi-final appearances (since 2016) ===
Bold indicates years team reached the final.

| Team | No. | Years in semi-finals |
|---|---|---|
| Donegal | 9 | **2016**, 2017, **2018, 2019**, **2020**, 2021, **2022**, **2024**, **2025** |
| Tyrone | 6 | **2016**, **2017**, 2019, **2021**, 2024, 2025 |
| Armagh | 6 | 2019, 2020, 2021, **2023**, **2024**, **2025** |
| Monaghan | 6 | 2016, 2017, 2018, **2021**, 2022, 2023 |
| Down | 6 | **2017**, 2018, 2020, 2023, 2024, 2025 |
| Cavan | 4 | 2016, **2019**, **2020**, 2022 |
| Derry | 2 | **2022**, **2023** |
| Fermanagh | 1 | **2018** |
| Antrim | 0 | —N/a |

=== Post-COVID team results ===
Legend

- 1st – Winner
- 2nd – Runner-up
- SF/QF/PR – Semi-finalist / Quarter-finalist / Preliminary round exit

For each year, the number of competing teams is shown (in brackets).

| Team | 2023 (9) | 2024 (9) | 2025 (9) | 2026 (9) | Years |
|---|---|---|---|---|---|
| Antrim | PR | QF | QF | QF | 4 |
| Armagh | 2nd | 2nd | 2nd | 1st | 4 |
| Cavan | QF | QF | QF | QF | 4 |
| Derry | 1st | QF | PR | SF | 4 |
| Donegal | QF | 1st | 1st | QF | 4 |
| Down | SF | SF | SF | SF | 4 |
| Fermanagh | QF | QF | QF | QF | 4 |
| Monaghan | SF | PR | QF | 2nd | 4 |
| Tyrone | QF | SF | SF | PR | 4 |

=== Consecutive titles ===
==== Septuple ====
- Cavan (1931, 1932, 1933, 1934, 1935, 1936, 1937)
- Cavan (1939, 1940, 1941, 1942, 1943, 1944, 1945)

==== Sextuple ====
- Antrim (1908, 1909, 1910, 1911, 1912, 1913)

==== Quintuple ====
- Cavan (1922, 1923, 1924, 1925, 1926)

==== Treble ====
- Cavan (1903, 1904, 1905)
- Cavan (1918, 1919, 1920)
- Cavan (1947, 1948, 1949)
- Down (1959, 1960, 1961)
- Armagh (2004, 2005, 2006)

==== Double ====
- Antrim (1900, 1901)
- Monaghan (1916, 1917)
- Monaghan (1921, 1922)
- Monaghan (1929, 1930)
- Cavan (1954, 1955)
- Tyrone (1956, 1957)
- Down (1965, 1966)
- Derry (1975, 1976)
- Tyrone (1995, 1996)
- Armagh (1999, 2000)
- Tyrone (2009, 2010)
- Donegal (2011, 2012)
- Tyrone (2016, 2017)
- Donegal (2018, 2019)
- Derry (2022, 2023)
- Donegal (2024, 2025)

=== Titles by decade ===
The most successful team of each decade, judged by number of Ulster SFC titles, is as follows:

- 1880s: 1 for Monaghan (1888)
- 1890s: 1 for Armagh (1890), Cavan (1891)
- 1900s: 3 for Antrim (01, 08, 09)
- 1910s: 4 for Antrim (10, 11, 12, 13)
- 1920s: 6 for Cavan (20, 23, 24, 25, 26, 28)
- 1930s: 8 for Cavan (31, 32, 33, 34, 35, 36, 37, 39)
- 1940s: 9 for Cavan (40, 41, 42, 43, 44, 45, 47, 48, 49)
- 1950s: 3 for Cavan (52, 54, 55)
- 1960s: 6 for Down (60, 61, 63, 65, 66, 68)
- 1970s: 3 for Derry (70, 75, 76)
- 1980s: 3 for Tyrone (84, 86, 89)
- 1990s: 2 for Donegal (90, 92), Down (91, 94), Tyrone (95, 96), Derry (93, 98)
- 2000s: 6 for Armagh (00, 02, 04, 05, 06, 08)
- 2010s: 5 for Donegal (11, 12, 14, 18, 19)
- 2020s: 2 for Derry (22, 23), Donegal (24, 25)

=== Team debuts ===
| Year | Debutants | Total |
|---|---|---|
| 1888 | Cavan, Monaghan | 2 |
| 1889 | None | 0 |
| 1890 | Antrim, Armagh, Tyrone | 3 |
| 1891–1902 | None | 0 |
| 1903 | Fermanagh | 1 |
| 1904 | Derry, Down | 2 |
| 1905 | None | 0 |
| 1906 | Donegal | 1 |
| 1907– | None | 0 |
| **Total** | | **9** |

=== Other records ===
==== Final success rate ====
No county teams have appeared in the final, being victorious on all occasions.

On the opposite end of the scale, one team has appeared in the final, losing on each occasion:

- Fermanagh (1914, 1935, 1945, 1982, 2008, 2018)

==== Winning other trophies ====
Although not an officially recognised achievement, a number of teams have achieved the distinction of winning the Ulster SFC, the All-Ireland SFC and the National Football League all in the same season.

- 2, Down (1960, 1968)
- 1, Cavan (1948)
- 1, Tyrone (2003)

==== Gaps ====
- Longest gaps between successive Ulster SFC titles:
  - 48 years: Armagh (1902–1950)
  - 41 years: Monaghan (1938–1979)
  - 33 years: Antrim (1913–1946)
  - 28 years: Cavan (1969–1997)
  - 25 years: Monaghan (1988–2013)
  - 24 years: Armagh (1953–1977)
  - 24 years: Derry (1998–2022)
  - 23 years: Cavan (1997–2020)
  - 19 years: Donegal (1992–2011)
  - 18 years: Monaghan (1888–1906)
- Longest gaps between successive Ulster SFC finals:
  - 58 years: Antrim (1951–2009)
  - 51 years: Tyrone (1890–1941)
  - 37 years: Fermanagh (1945–1982)
  - 34 years: Derry (1921–1955)
  - 27 years: Monaghan (1952–1979)
  - 26 years: Fermanagh (1982–2008)
  - 21 years: Fermanagh (1914–1935)
  - 20 years: Antrim (1926–1946)
  - 19 years: Monaghan (1988–2007)
  - 18 years: Cavan (2001–2019)

==== Active gaps ====
- Longest active gaps since an Ulster SFC title:
  - 74 years: Antrim (1951–)
  - 31 years: Down (1994–)
  - 10 years: Monaghan (2015–)
  - 5 years: Cavan (2020–)
  - 4 years: Tyrone (2021–)
  - 2 years: Derry (2023–)
  - 1 year: Donegal (2025–)
  - 0 years: Armagh (2026–)
- Longest active gap since an Ulster SFC final appearance:
  - 16 years: Antrim (2009–)
  - 8 years: Down (2017–)
  - 7 years: Fermanagh (2018–)
  - 5 years: Cavan (2020–)
  - 4 years: Tyrone (2021–)
  - 2 years: Derry (2023–)
  - 1 year: Donegal (2025–)
  - 0 years: Monaghan (2026–)

==== Ulster final pairings ====
| Pairing | Meetings | First meeting | Last meeting |
|---|---|---|---|
| Armagh v Cavan | 14 | 1891 | 1954 |
| Antrim v Cavan | 13 | 1907 | 1951 |
| Cavan v Monaghan | 13 | 1888 | 1952 |
| Cavan v Down | 11 | 1940 | 1978 |
| Down v Tyrone | 6 | 1973 | 2017 |
| Armagh v Donegal | 6 | 1990 | 2025 |
| Cavan v Tyrone | 5 | 1933 | 2001 |
| Donegal v Down | 5 | 1963 | 2012 |
| Derry v Donegal | 5 | 1992 | 2022 |
| Armagh v Tyrone | 4 | 1890 | 2005 |
| Donegal v Monaghan | 4 | 1979 | 2015 |
| Monaghan v Tyrone | 4 | 1988 | 2021 |
| Armagh v Derry | 4 | 1977 | 2023 |
| Armagh v Monaghan | 4 | 1917 | 2026 |
| Antrim v Armagh | 3 | 1901 | 1912 |
| Derry v Down | 3 | 1958 | 1975 |
| Armagh v Down | 3 | 1961 | 1999 |
| Donegal v Tyrone | 3 | 1972 | 2016 |
| Cavan v Donegal | 3 | 1983 | 2020 |
| Antrim v Monaghan | 2 | 1906 | 1913 |
| Cavan v Fermanagh | 2 | 1935 | 1945 |
| Derry v Monaghan | 2 | 1921 | 1985 |
| Armagh v Derry | 2 | 1955 | 1997 |
| Armagh v Fermanagh | 2 | 1982 | 2008 |
| Fermanagh v Monaghan | 1 | 1914 | |
| Derry v Tyrone | 1 | 1957 | |
| Antrim v Derry | 1 | 1970 | |
| Cavan v Derry | 1 | 1976 | |
| Antrim v Tyrone | 1 | 2009 | |
| Donegal v Fermanagh | 1 | 2018 | |

== Player records ==
- On 9 July 2006, Oisín McConville became the record point scorer in the history of the Ulster Senior Football Championship in that year's final at Croke Park.

=== All-time top scorers: Ulster players ===
As of 3 June 2008, according to the BBC. Updated list (2012)

| Rank | Player | County | Tally | Total score | Championship years |
|---|---|---|---|---|---|
| 1 | Paddy Bradley | Derry | 17–201 | 252 | 2000–2012 |
| 2 | Michael Murphy | Donegal | 4–223 | 239 | 2007-2022 |
| 3 | Oisín McConville | Armagh | 11–197 | 230 | 1997–2008 |
| 4 | Peter Canavan | Tyrone | 9–191 | 218 | 1989–2005 |
| 5 | Paddy Doherty | Down | 15–159 | 204 | 1954–1971 |
| 6 | Peter Donohoe | Cavan | 17–133 | 184 | 1945–1955 |
| 7 | Seán O'Neill | Down | 17–125 | 176 | 1959–1975 |
| 8 | Charlie Gallagher | Cavan | 10–142 | 172 | 1955–1969 |
| 9 | Steven McDonnell | Armagh | 15–111 | 156 | 2000–2011 |
| 10 | Seán O'Connell | Derry | 11–118 | 151 | 1957–1975 |

Notes:

- Includes Ulster SFC, All-Ireland SFC and SFC Qualifiers.

=== All-time top goalscorers: Ulster players ===
As of 15 June 2008, according to the Sunday Tribune.

| Rank | Player | County | Number of goals | Championship years |
|---|---|---|---|---|
| 1= | Steven McDonnell | Armagh | 17 | 1999–2011 |
| 1= | Peter Donohoe | Cavan | 17 | 1945–1955 |
| 1= | Seán O'Neill | Down | 17 | 1959–1975 |
| 4 | Paddy Doherty | Down | 15 | 1954–1971 |
| 5= | Paddy Bradley ** | Derry | 13 | 2000–2012 |
| 5= | Ger Houlahan | Armagh | 13 | 1984–2000 |
| 5= | James McCartan Snr | Down | 13 | 1958–1967 |
| 5= | Brendan Coulter * | Down | 13 | 2000–2014 |
| 9= | Joe Stafford | Cavan | 12 | 1943–1949 |
| 9= | Enda Muldoon | Derry | 12 | 1997–2011 |
| 9= | Jason Reilly | Cavan | 12 | 1997–2008 |
| 12= | Seán O'Connell | Derry | 11 | 1957–1975 |
| 12= | PT Treacy | Fermanagh | 11 | 1960–1973 |
| 12= | Oisín McConville | Armagh | 11 | 1997–2008 |

Notes:

- Includes Ulster SFC, All-Ireland SFC and SFC Qualifiers.
- Since the records have been done, Brendan Coulter has become the top goal scorer with 18.
  - Paddy Bradley scored 4 more goals and finished on 17.

=== Ulster SFC top scorers: by year ===
- 1948 Peter Donohoe (Cavan) 3–12
- 1949 Peter Donohoe (Cavan) 4–10
- 1950 Peter Donohoe (Cavan) 3–18
- 1951 Joe McCallin (Antrim) 3–14
- 1952 John Joe Cassidy (Cavan) 1–7
- 1953 Art O'Hagan (Armagh) 3–4
- 1954 Brian Gallagher (Cavan) 0–14
- 1955 Peter Donohoe (Cavan) 0–14
- 1956 Frankie Donnelly (Tyrone) & Victor Sherlock (Cavan) 2–7
- 1957 Frankie Donnelly (Tyrone) 1–14
- 1958 Paddy Doherty (Down) 3–14
- 1959 Paddy Doherty (Down) 1–17
- 1960 Con Smith (Cavan) 1–17
- 1961 Paddy Doherty (Down) 1–16
- 1962 Seamus McMahon (Cavan) & Frankie Donnelly (Tyrone) 0–11
- 1963 Harry Laverty (Donegal) 2–10
- 1964 Charlie Gallagher (Cavan) 0-*19
- 1965 Charlie Gallagher (Cavan) 2–29
- 1966 PT Treacy (Fermanagh) 4–13
- 1967 Charlie Gallagher (Cavan) 0-*19
- 1968 Paddy Doherty (Down) 1–17
- 1969 Sean Woods (Monaghan) & Gene Cusack (Cavan) 3–7
- 1970 Andy McCallin (Antrim) 3–15
- 1971 Sean O'Connell (Derry) 1–18
- 1972 Joe Winston (Donegal) 0–26
- 1973 Patsy Hetherington (Tyrone) 0–17
- 1974 Seamus Bonner (Donegal) 6–4
- 1975 Willie Walsh (Down) 3–8
- 1976 Steve Duggan (Cavan) 1–22
- 1977 Brendan Kelly (Derry) 2–10
- 1978 Donal Donohoe (Cavan) 0–12
- 1979 Kieran Finlay (Monaghan) 1–18
- 1980 Patsy Hetherington (Tyrone) & Patsy Kerlin (Tyrone) 4–3
- 1981 Eamonn McEneaney (Monaghan) & Brendan McGovern (Down) 1–17
- 1982 John Corvan (Armagh) & Peter McGinnity (Fermanagh) 1–9
- 1983 Derek McDonnell (Cavan) 4–11
- 1984 Frank McGuigan (Tyrone) 0–19
- 1985 Eamonn McEneaney (Monaghan) 3–16
- 1986 Brendan Mason (Down) 3–17
- 1987 Enda Gormley (Derry) 0–20
- 1988 Stephen Conway (Tyrone) 0–17
- 1989 Martin McHugh (Donegal) 2–16
- 1990 Manus Boyle (Donegal) 1–16
- 1991 Ross Carr (Down) 0–21
- 1992 Enda Gormley (Derry) 0–25
- 1993 John Toner (Armagh) 0–23
- 1994 Peter Canavan (Tyrone) 1–17
- 1995 Peter Canavan (Tyrone) 0–20
- 1996 Peter Canavan (Tyrone) 3–13
- 1997 Joe Brolly (Derry) 3–15
- 1998 Joe Brolly (Derry) & Tony Boyle (Donegal) 0–13
- 1999 Oisín McConville (Armagh) 3–18
- 2000 Rory Gallagher (Fermanagh) 1–19
- 2001 Rory Gallagher (Fermanagh) 0–16
- 2002 Rory Gallagher (Fermanagh) 4–12
- 2003 Peter Canavan (Tyrone) 1–38
- 2004 Colm McFadden (Donegal) & Oisín McConville (Armagh) 1–13
- 2005 Stephen O'Neill (Tyrone) 1–26
- 2006 Oisín McConville (Armagh) 3–25
- 2007 Tommy Freeman (Monaghan) 1-15
- 2008 Steven McDonnell (Armagh) 1-17
- 2009 Paddy Bradley (Derry) 3–12
- 2010 Martin Clarke (Down) 1–30
- 2011 Martin Clarke (Down) & Seán Cavanagh (Tyrone) 2–16
- 2012 Colm McFadden (Donegal) 2–15
- 2013 Colm McFadden (Donegal) 2–12
- 2014 Conor McManus (Monaghan) 1–14
- 2015 Conor McManus (Monaghan) 1–19
- 2016 Conor McManus (Monaghan) 1–20
- 2017 Conor McManus (Monaghan) 2–13
- 2018 Paddy McBrearty (Donegal) 0–19
- 2019 Rian O'Neill (Armagh) 0–18
- 2020 Gearóid McKiernan (Cavan) 0-11 & Rian O'Neill (Armagh) 0-11 & Donal O'Hare (Down) 1–8
- 2021 Darren McCurry (Tyrone) 0–22
- 2022 Shane McGuigan (Derry) 1–17
- 2023 Shane McGuigan (Derry) 2–21
- 2024 Paddy Lynch (Cavan) 1–14
- 2025 Patrick McBrearty (Donegal) 1–18

* Scores only include Ulster SFC. All-Ireland SFC and SFC Qualifiers are not included.

== Managers ==
Managers in the Ulster SFC are involved in the day-to-day running of the team, including the training, team selection, and sourcing of players from the club championships. Their influence varies from county-to-county and is related to the individual county boards. From 2018, all inter-county head coaches must be Award 2 qualified. The manager is assisted by a team of two or three selectors and an extensive backroom team consisting of various coaches. Prior to the development of the concept of a manager in the 1970s, teams were usually managed by a team of selectors with one member acting as chairman.

=== Winning managers (1983–present) ===
| # | Manager(s) | Winning team(s) | Titles(s) | Winning years |
|---|---|---|---|---|
| 1 | Mickey Harte | Tyrone | 6 | 2003, 2007, 2009, 2010, 2016, 2017 |
| 2 | Brian McEniff | Donegal | 5 | 1972, 1974, 1983, 1990, 1992 |
| 2 | Jim McGuinness | Donegal | 5 | 2011, 2012, 2014, 2024, 2025 |
| 4 | Art McRory | Tyrone | 4 | 1984, 1995*, 1996*, 2001* |
| 4 | Joe Kernan | Armagh | 4 | 2002, 2004, 2005, 2006 |
| 6 | Eugene McKenna | Tyrone | 3 | 1995*, 1996*, 2001* |
| 7 | Seán McCague | Monaghan | 2 | 1985, 1988 |
| 7 | Pete McGrath | Down | 2 | 1991, 1994 |
| 7 | Brian McAlinden; Brian Canavan | Armagh | 2 | 1999, 2000 |
| 7 | Malachy O'Rourke | Monaghan | 2 | 2013, 2015 |
| 7 | Declan Bonner | Donegal | 2 | 2018, 2019 |
| 12 | John Donnelly | Tyrone | 1 | 1986 |
| 12 | Eamonn Coleman | Derry | 1 | 1993 |
| 12 | Martin McHugh | Cavan | 1 | 1997 |
| 12 | Brian Mullins | Derry | 1 | 1998 |
| 12 | Peter McDonnell | Armagh | 1 | 2008 |
| 12 | Mickey Graham | Cavan | 1 | 2020 |
| 12 | Feargal Logan, Brian Dooher | Tyrone | 1 | 2021 |
| 12 | Rory Gallagher | Derry | 1 | 2022 |
| 12 | Ciaran Meenagh | Derry | 1 | 2023 |

==== Notes ====
* = joint managers

== Media coverage ==
=== Television ===
Matches are currently broadcast on RTÉ and by the BBC either on BBC 2 Northern Ireland or through the BBC iPlayer Selected games are also broadcast on the GAA's own GAA+ streaming platform.

Highlights packages are broadcast on RTÉ as part of The Sunday Game.

=== Radio ===
Radio coverage is provided by RTÉ Radio 1 on Saturday Sport and Sunday Sport.

=== Print media ===
Extensive coverage is offered in both Northern Ireland and the Republic of Ireland by daily and Sunday newspapers including The Irish News, the Irish Independent, the Irish Examiner and specialist GAA publications such as Gaelic Life.

== Venues ==
| Belfast | Derry | Clones, County Monaghan | Omagh, County Tyrone | Enniskillen, County Fermanagh |
|---|---|---|---|---|
| Casement Park | Celtic Park | St Tiernach's Park | Healy Park | Brewster Park |
| Capacity: 31,661 | Capacity: 18,000 | Capacity: 29,000 | Capacity: 18,500 | Capacity: 16,000 |

=== Stadia and locations ===
| County team | Location | Province | Stadium | Capacity |
|---|---|---|---|---|
| Antrim | Belfast | Ulster | Corrigan Park | 3,700 |
| Armagh | Armagh | Ulster | Athletic Grounds | 18,500 |
| Cavan | Cavan | Ulster | Breffni Park | 25,030 |
| Derry | Derry | Ulster | Celtic Park | 18,500 |
| Donegal | Ballybofey | Ulster | MacCumhaill Park | 17,500 |
| Down | Newry | Ulster | Páirc Esler | 20,000 |
| Fermanagh | Enniskillen | Ulster | Brewster Park | 18,000 |
| Monaghan | Clones | Ulster | St Tiernach's Park | 29,000 |
| Tyrone | Omagh | Ulster | Healy Park | 17,636 |

== See also ==
- Ulster Senior Football Championship records and statistics
- Ulster Senior Club Football Championship
- Ulster Senior Hurling Championship
- All-Ireland Senior Football Championship
  - Connacht Senior Football Championship
  - Leinster Senior Football Championship
  - Munster Senior Football Championship
