= Antrim GAA =

Governing body of Gaelic games

- Irish: Aontroim
- Nickname(s): The Saffs; The Glensmen
- Founded: 1885
- Province: Ulster
- Dominant sport: Hurling
- Ground(s): Corrigan Park
- County colours: Saffron White

Executive
- Secretary: Caroline McLaughlin
- Treasurer: Angela Callan

County teams
- NFL: Division 4
- NHL: Division 1B
- Football Championship: Sam Maguire Cup
- Hurling Championship: Joe McDonagh Cup

The Antrim County Board of the Gaelic Athletic Association (Irish: Cumann Lúthchleas Gael Coiste Chontae Aontroma) or Antrim GAA is one of the 32 county boards of the GAA in Ireland, and is responsible for Gaelic games in County Antrim, Northern Ireland. The county board is also responsible for the Antrim county teams.

The county hurling team contested All-Ireland Senior Hurling Championship (SHC) finals on two occasions: 1943 and 1989. The county football team contested All-Ireland Senior Football Championship (SFC) finals on two occasions: 1911 and 1912.

As of 2025, there were 51 clubs affiliated to Antrim GAA.

== Hurling ==
=== Clubs ===
Clubs contest the Antrim Senior Hurling Championship.

Antrim's first All-Star, Ciaran Barr, helped Belfast club Rossa to reach the 1989 club hurling final against Buffer's Alley. Dunloy were back in the All-Ireland club final in 1995, when they lost in a replay, 1996 and 2003 when they were heavily beaten.

- All-Ireland Senior Club Hurling Championships: 2
  - 1983, 2012 (Loughgiel Shamrocks)
- All-Ireland Junior Club Hurling Championships:
  - 2014 Kickhams Creggan
- All-Ireland Intermediate Club Hurling Championships:
  - 2015 O Donovan Rossa Belfast

=== County team ===
Antrim is the only Ulster county to appear in an All-Ireland Senior Hurling Championship (SHC) final, the first of which was in 1943 losing to Cork and the second was in 1989 losing to Tipperary. In 1943 Antrim defeated both Galway (by 7-0 to 6-2) and Kilkenny (by 3-3 to 1-6) in the old Corrigan Park, but disappointed in the All-Ireland against Cork. Two years previously, Antrim had been graded Junior a year before, and had been beaten by Down in the Ulster final. It was only competing in the Senior Championship because the Junior grade was abolished. Antrim hurlers featured strongly in Ulster Railway cup final appearances in 1945, 1993 and 1995. In hurling, the progression that began with Loughgiel's success at club hurling level in 1983 (with players like 15-stone goalkeeper Niall Patterson) culminated in an All-Ireland final appearance in 1989.

== Football ==
=== Clubs ===
Clubs contest the Antrim Senior Football Championship.

- All-Ireland Senior Club Football Championship
  - 2010 (Naomh Gall, Beal Feirste)

=== County team ===
The county team was the first in the province of Ulster to appear in an All-Ireland final, in 1911 and repeated the feat again in 1912, losing on both occasions.

The county team has won the Ulster Senior Football Championship on ten occasions: 1900, 1901, 1908, 1909, 1910, 1911, 1912, 1913, 1946 and 1951.

A drawn Ulster SFC semi-final with Derry in 2000 was one of the highlights of Antrim's football at inter-county level, alongside winning the 2008 Tommy Murphy Cup, beating Wicklow in the final and gaining revenge for losing the 2007 final to the same opponents. Antrim reached the 2009 Ulster SFC final, the first Antrim team to do so for 31 years. The team lost to the 2008 All-Ireland SFC winner Tyrone.
