= 2018 All-Ireland Senior Football Championship final =

- Event: 2018 All-Ireland Senior Football Championship
Dublin	Tyrone
2–17 (23)	1–14 (17)
- Date: 2 September 2018
- Venue: Croke Park, Dublin
- Man of the Match: Jack McCaffrey
- Referee: Conor Lane
- Attendance: 82,300
- Weather: 19 °C, Sunny

The 2018 All-Ireland Senior Football Championship final was a Gaelic football match played at Croke Park in Dublin on 2 September 2018 between Dublin and Tyrone, the culmination of the 2018 All-Ireland Senior Football Championship. It was the 131st final of that sport's primary competition, the All-Ireland Senior Football Championship.

It was the second time the teams had met in the final; Dublin won the first encounter in 1995. It was the third consecutive year that a team qualified under the system of second chances introduced in 2001; Tyrone qualified despite defeat in its provincial championship.

Dublin won the final by a margin of six points, on a scoreline of 2–17 to 1–14. The victory was Dublin's fourth consecutive All-Ireland SFC title, making it the third county to win "four-in-a-row" (this had been achieved previously by Wexford in 1915–18 and Kerry in 1929–32 and 1978–81).

The game was televised nationally on RTÉ2 as part of The Sunday Game live programme, presented by Michael Lyster from Croke Park, with studio analysis from Joe Brolly, Pat Spillane, and Colm O'Rourke. Match commentary was provided by Ger Canning with analysis by Dessie Dolan. This was the last occasion on which Michael Lyster presented RTÉ's television coverage, having decided to retire from The Sunday Game at the end of 2018. The game was also televised internationally by Sky Sports, presented by Rachel Wyse and Brian Carney.

== Paths to the final ==
=== Dublin ===
==== Leinster Championship ====
27 May 2018 Quarter-Final	Dublin	4–25 (37) – (14) 1–11	Wicklow	Portlaoise
4:00 pm		(HT: 4–13 – 1–04)		Venue: O'Moore Park
	Gls: C Kilkenny 1, B Fenton 1, C O'Callaghan 1, D Rock 1 Pts: Ciaran Kilkenny 1–7, Brian Fenton and Con O'Callaghan 1–3 each, Dean Rock 1–2 (0–2f), Paddy Andrews 0–3, Conor McHugh 0-2 (0–1f), Philly McMahon, Michael Darragh McCauley, Brian Howard, Paul Mannion (1 '45), Colm Basquel 0–1 each	Report	Gls: J Stafford 1 Pts: James Stafford 1–1, Mark Jackson (0–2f), Darren Hayden, Theo Smyth 0–2 each, Dean Healy, Rory Finn, Mark Kenny, Seanie Furlong (0–1f) 0–1 each	Referee: Ciaran Branagan (Down); Attendance: 11,786

10 June 2018 Semi-Final	Dublin	2–25 (31) – (12) 0–12	Longford	Dublin
4:00pm		(HT: 2–13 – 0–07)		Venue: Croke Park
	Gls: P Mannion 1, D Rock 1 Pts: Dean Rock 1–6 (0–5f), Paul Mannion 1–2, Brian Fenton and Ciaran Kilkenny 0–4 each, Con O'Callaghan and Colm Basquel 0–2 each, Philly McMahon, Brian Howard, James McCarthy, Niall Scully, Paddy Andrews 0–1 each	Report	Pts: Robbie Smyth 0–5 (0–3f), Paddy Collum (1 '45), Michael Quinn, Donal McElligott, Dessie Reynolds 0–1, David McGivney (0–1f), Rian Brady, Sean McCormack 0–1 each	Referee: Maurice Deegan (Laois); TV: RTÉ

24 June 2018 Final	Dublin	1–25 (28) – (10) 0–10	Laois	Dublin
16:00 IST (UTC+1)		(HT: 1–08 – 0–05)		Venue: Croke Park
	Gls: Ciaran Kilkenny; Pts: Dean Rock (8, 5f, 1 '45), Ciaran Kilkenny (4), Cormac Costello (4), Brian Fenton (2), Con O'Callaghan (2), Paddy Andrews (2), Brian Howard, Niall Scully, Paul Mannion	Report	Pts: Donie Kingston (4, 2f), Alan Farrell (2), Gary Walsh (2), Kieran Lillis, Evan O'Carroll	Referee: Barry Cassidy (Derry); Attendance: 41,728; TV: RTÉ

Dublin won the Leinster Championship and so advanced directly to the quarter-final group stage.

==== All-Ireland Quarter-Final Group Stage (Super 8s) ====
14 July 2018 Phase 1	Dublin	2–15 (21) – (16) 0–16	Donegal	Dublin
19:00 IST (UTC+1)		(HT: 1-09 – 0-08)		Venue: Croke Park
	Gls: N Scully 2 Pts: D Rock 7 (5f, 1 '45'), B Howard 2, C Costello 2, P Flynn 2, C Kilkenny 1, J McCarthy 1	Report	Pts: M Murphy 6 (3f, 1 '45'), J Brennan 3, M Langan 2, R McHugh 2, C Thompson 1, F McGlynn 1, É Doherty 1	Referee: Conor Lane (Cork); Attendance: 53,501 (double header); TV: RTÉ

21 July 2018 Phase 2	Tyrone	0–14 (14) – (17) 1–14	Dublin	Omagh
19:00 IST (UTC+1)		(HT: 0–05 – 0–07)		Venue: Healy Park
	Pts: P Harte 3 (2f), C McAliskey 2 (1 '45), C McShane 2, K McGeary 2, M McKernan 1, T McCann 1, F Burns 1, M Bradley 1, H Loughran 1	Report	Gls: J McCarthy 1 Pts: D Rock 6 (4f), C Kilkenny 2, P McMahon 1, B Howard 1, J Small 1, J McCaffrey 1, K McManamon 1, P Flynn 1	Referee: David Coldrick (Meath); Attendance: 16,205; TV: Sky Sports

5 August 2018 Phase 3	Dublin	4–24 (36) – (22) 2–16	Roscommon	Dublin
15:30 IST (UTC+1)		(HT: 2–12 – 0–07)		Venue: Croke Park
	Gls: E O'Gara 2, P Flynn 1, MD Macauley 1 Pts: C Costello 9 (1 45, 1f), K McManamon 3 (2f), P Flynn 3, P Andrews 2, C McHugh 2, E O'Gara 2, P McMahon 1, J Small 1, MD Macauley 1, M Schutte 1, P Small 1	Report	Gls: G Patterson 1, D Smith 1 Pts: D Murtagh 6 (2f), D Smith 3 (1 45), C Lennon 2, P Kelly 2, N Kilroy 1, C Murtagh 1 (1f), C Devaney 1	Referee: Cormac Reilly (Meath); Attendance: 33,240; TV: RTÉ News Now

Dublin finished first in Group 2 and advanced to the All-Ireland semi-final, to play the team who placed second in Group 1 - Galway.

==== All-Ireland Semi-Final ====
11 August 2018 Semi-Final	Dublin	1–24 (27) – (18) 2–12	Galway	Dublin
17:00 IST (UTC+1)		(HT: 1–09 – 1–07)		Venue: Croke Park
	Gls: C O'Callaghan 1 Pts: D Rock 5 (4f), P Mannion 4, C Costello 3 (1f), C O'Callaghan 3, C Kilkenny 3, B Fenton 2, K McManamon 2, B Howard 1, P Flynn 1	Report	Gls: S Walsh 1, D Comer 1 Pts: S Walsh 5 (3f), I Burke 2, J Heaney 1, T Flynn 1, D Comer 1, M Daly 1, G O'Donnell 1	Referee: Barry Cassidy (Derry); Attendance: 54,716; TV: RTÉ; Sky Sports

=== Tyrone ===
==== Ulster Championship ====
20 May 2018 Quarter-Final B	Tyrone	1–16 (19) – (21) 1–18	Monaghan	Omagh
4:30 pm		(HT: 0–08 – 1–07)		Venue: Healy Park
	Gls: M McKernan 1 Pts: C McAliskey 6 (3f), L Brennan 3 (3f), N Sludden 2, M McKernan 1, M Donnelly 1, P Harte 1, C McShane 1, P Hampsey 1	Report	Gls: V Corey 1 Pts: C McManus 6 (4f), R Beggan 4 (2f, 2 ‘45), J McCarron 2 (1f), D Mone 1, F Kelly 1, R McAnespie 1, D Wylie 1, C McCarthy 1, C Walshe 0-1	Referee: David Coldrick (Meath); Attendance: 15,029; TV: BBC deferred

Having been beaten by Monaghan, Tyrone were eliminated from the Ulster championship and entered Round 1 of the All-Ireland qualifiers.

==== All-Ireland Qualifiers ====
9 June 2018 Round 1	Meath	0–19 (19) – (20) 2–14 (a.e.t.)	Tyrone	Navan
17:00 IST (UTC+1)		(HT: 0–07 – 1–06) (FT: 0–14 – 1–11)		Venue: Páirc Tailteann
		Report		Referee: Paddy Neilan (Roscommon); TV: Sky Sports

23 June 2018 Round 2	Carlow	1–10 (13) – (23) 3–14	Tyrone	Carlow
17:00 IST (UTC+1)				Venue: Dr. Cullen Park
		Report		Referee: Conor Lane (Cork)

30 June 2018 Round 3	Cavan	1–12 (15) – (18) 0–18	Tyrone	Enniskillen
17:00 IST (UTC+1)				Venue: Brewster Park
		Report		Referee: David Coldrick (Meath); TV: Sky Sports

7 July 2018 Round 4	Cork	0–13 (13) – (29) 3–20	Tyrone	Portlaoise
17:00 IST (UTC+1)				Venue: O'Moore Park
		Report		Referee: Maurice Deegan (Laois); TV: Sky Sports

==== All-Ireland Quarter-Final Group Stage (Super 8s) ====
14 July 2018 Phase 1	Tyrone	4–24 (36) – (18) 2–12	Roscommon	Dublin
17:00 IST (UTC+1)		(HT: 1–10 – 0–06)		Venue: Croke Park
	Gls: P Harte 1, N Sludden 1, C Meyler 1, R Donnelly 1 Pts: R Donnelly 4, C McAliskey 4 (3f), P Harte 3 (3f), N Sludden 2, C McShane 2, M Bradley 2, M McKernan 1, R McNamee 1, T McCann 1, M Donnelly 1, C Meyler 1, D McClure 1, R Brennan 1	Report	Gls: E Smith 1, C Murtagh 1 Pts: D Murtagh 5 (3f), C Murtagh 3 (2f), C Devaney 1, F Cregg 1, C Daly 1, P Kelly 1	Referee: David Gough (Meath); Attendance: 53,501 (double header); TV: Sky Sports

21 July 2018 Phase 2	Tyrone	0–14 (14) – (17) 1–14	Dublin	Omagh
19:00 IST (UTC+1)		(HT: 0–05 – 0–07)		Venue: Healy Park
	Pts: P Harte 3 (2f), C McAliskey 2 (1 '45), C McShane 2, K McGeary 2, M McKernan 1, T McCann 1, F Burns 1, M Bradley 1, H Loughran 1	Report	Gls: J McCarthy 1 Pts: D Rock 6 (4f), C Kilkenny 2, P McMahon 1, B Howard 1, J Small 1, J McCaffrey 1, K McManamon 1, P Flynn 1	Referee: David Coldrick (Meath); Attendance: 16,205; TV: Sky Sports

5 August 2018 Phase 3	Donegal	1–13 (16) – (23) 2–17	Tyrone	Ballybofey
15:30 IST (UTC+1)		(HT: 1–06 – 0–06)		Venue: MacCumhaill Park
	Gls: M Murphy 1 Pts: J Brennan 3, M Murphy 2 (1f, 1 45'), OM Niallais 2, P McGrath 1, EB Gallagher 1, M Langan 1, R McHugh 1, C Thompson 1, N O’Donnell 1	Report	Gls: H Loughran 1, D McClure 1 Pts: L Brennan 4 (1f), C McAliskey 2 (2f), P Hampsey 2, M Donnelly 2, N Morgan 1 (1f), R McNamee 1, T McCann 1, P Harte 1 (1f), C Cavanagh 1, M Bradley 1, K McGeary 1	Referee: Joe McQuillan (Cavan); Attendance: 16,242; TV: RTÉ

Tyrone finished second in Group 2, behind Dublin, and advanced to the All-Ireland semi-final, to play the winner of Group 2, Monaghan.

==== All-Ireland Semi-Final ====
12 August 2018 Semi-Final	Monaghan	0–15 (15) – (16) 1–13	Tyrone	Dublin
15:30 IST (UTC+1)		(HT: 0–08 – 0–08)		Venue: Croke Park
	Pts: C McManus 0-07 (6f), C McCarthy 0-03, K Hughes 0-02, D Wylie 0-01, F Kelly 0-01, R Beggan 0-01 (1f)	Report	Gls: N Sludden 1 Pts: C McAliskey 0-04 (2f), N Sludden 1-02, P Harte 0-02 (1f), C McShane 0-01, C Cavanagh 0-01, F Burns 0-01, T McCann 0-01, L Brennan 0-01 (1f)	Referee: Anthony Nolan (Wicklow); Attendance: 49,696; TV: RTÉ; Sky Sports

== Pre-match ==
The match had originally been scheduled for 26 August, but had to be moved to accommodate the visit of Pope Francis to Ireland, where he attended the World Meeting of Families. The final had been moved from its traditional date of the third Sunday of September to allow more time for club matches.

=== Tyrone's RTÉ boycott ===
On Monday 20 August 2018, just under two weeks before the final, the Irish Independent reported that RTÉ had confirmed that Tyrone would not be involved in any media coverage with the national broadcaster surrounding the event. The boycott, considered a tradition at this stage in relation to Tyrone, involved for the first time an All-Ireland SFC final, after which RTÉ airs television coverage from the hotel in which the winning team is booked to stay. This meant that, in the event of a Tyrone win, RTÉ would be unable to cover the after-match events as per usual, including interviews on the pitch with players and the management team. Tyrone's All-Ireland SFC final boycott was a continuation of a seven-year blacklisting of RTÉ by the county, the cause of which was a radio sketch aired in 2011 on RTÉ Radio 1. The sketch incensed Tyrone, as it was deemed to be mocking Michaela Harte (daughter of Tyrone manager Mickey Harte), shortly after she was murdered while on honeymoon in Mauritius.

Former All-Ireland SFC winning captain Peter Canavan suggested the timing of RTÉ's announcement was intended to put pressure on Tyrone.

=== Minor final ===
Kerry played Galway in the All-Ireland Minor Football Championship final which took place before the senior final. Kerry won the game on a 0–21 to 1–14 scoreline to complete a five in a row of All Ireland wins.

=== Jubilee team ===
To mark 25 years since the event, the Derry team that won the 1993 All-Ireland SFC final were presented to the crowd before the senior match.

== Match ==
=== Officials ===
On 20 August, Cork's Conor Lane was confirmed as the referee for the final. He was previously in charge of the drawn final between Dublin and Mayo in 2016.

=== Team news ===
Tyrone made one change to the team from the semi-final win over Monaghan county football teamMonaghan with Mark Bradley starting ahead of Lee Brennan. Despite fears of an injury to Cian O'Sullivan, Dublin named an unchanged side, with the same starting fifteen that overcame Galway three weeks earlier.

=== Summary ===
Dublin began the game unchanged with Tyrone making 2 late changes - Rory Brennan and Conor Meyler replaced Frank Burns and Richie Donnelly. Prior to the game, Dublin, as reigning All-Ireland champions for three consecutive years, were heavy favourites to win. They took an early lead after Dean Rock scored a free, but he put his next two efforts wide, allowing Tyrone to assert dominance for fifteen minutes. During this timeframe, the Ulster team opened up a four-point lead, with the score poised at 0–05 to 0–01 in favour of Mickey Harte's side. However, the tide of the game turned once more in a dramatic, as Paul Mannion was fouled in Tyrone's penalty box, leading Conor Lane to award a penalty to Dublin, which Mannion calmly slotted home. Coupled with another successful free from Rock, this left the teams equal with five points apiece. Tyrone only managed to secure one more point in the remaining twenty-four minutes of the half, and their lack of clinicality in front of goal opened the door to a resurgent Dublin side. In the twenty-eighth minute, Dublin pulled further ahead courtesy of another goal. Con O'Callaghan took the ball deep into Tyrone territory before offloading to Niall Scully, who calmly fisted it into Niall Morgan's unguarded net. Thus, the teams headed in at half-time with Dublin seven points to the good, having racked up 2–07 to Tyrone's 0–06.

While Tyrone reduced the deficit by two early in the second half, with points from Connor McAliskey and Kieran McGeary narrowing Dublin's margin somewhat, the team in blue, affectionately known as "the Dubs", had accumulated an unassailable lead. The second thirty-five minutes were not entirely without incident, however; Dublin had pulled further out of sight, with points from Ciarán Kilkenny and Brian Fenton further diminishing whatever minuscule chances Tyrone had at mounting a comeback. However, in the sixty-sixth minute, Tyrone were given a late opportunity to draw near again, as Philly McMahon brought down Colm Cavanagh with a rash challenge, granting Tyrone a penalty - this was coolly dispatched by Peter Harte, breaching Stephen Cluxton's net for the first time in the game. Later, John Small was given a second yellow card, and ergo sent off, leaving Dublin to finish with just fourteen men. Ultimately, a point at the death from Kevin McManamon put the victory beyond any doubt. Conor Lane, the County Cork native, blew the final whistle, confirming Dublin's victory with a margin of six points. The final score was 2–17 to 1–14. The man of the match award was bestowed upon Jack McCaffrey, who received the award ahead of his other nominated teammates, Kilkenny and Mannion.

As captain, goalkeeper Stephen Cluxton, making his 200th appearance for the county, lifted the Sam Maguire Cup aloft from the Hogan Stand. The win represented Dublin's fourth consecutive win under the management of Jim Gavin, a feat only previously achieved by teams from two other counties - Kerry and Wexford. It also further extended Dublin's unbeaten run in the Championship; the side was last beaten in 2014.

=== Details ===
RTÉ
Sky Sports
BBC

2 September 2018
15:30 IST (UTC+1)
Final

Report

Dublin	2–17 (23) – 1–14 (17)	Tyrone
(HT: 2–7 – 0–6)
Gls: Paul Mannion, Niall Scully; Pts: Dean Rock (0–7), Ciarán Kilkenny (0–4), Brian Fenton (0–2), Brian Howard (0–1), Jack McCaffrey (0–1), Kevin McManamon (0–1), Michael Darragh Macauley (0–1)		Gls: Peter Harte; Pts: Connor McAliskey (0-3), Lee Brennan (0-3), Mark Bradley (0-2), Cathal McShane (0-2), Kieran McGeary (0-1), Peter Harte (1-1), Pádraig Hampsey (0-1), Tiernan McCann (0-1)

Croke Park, Dublin
Referee: Conor Lane
Attendance: 82,300

Dublin	Tyrone

GK	1	Stephen Cluxton (c)
CB	2	Philly McMahon
FB	3	Cian O'Sullivan	(substituted off) 26'
CB	4	Eoin Murchan	(substituted off) 58'
WB	5	John Small	(yellow card) 41,70+1' (yellow-red card)
HB	6	Jonny Cooper	(substituted off) 63'
WB	7	Jack McCaffrey
MF	8	Brian Fenton
MF	9	James McCarthy
WF	10	Niall Scully	(substituted off) 52'
HF	11	Con O'Callaghan
FW	12	Brian Howard
CF	13	Paul Mannion	(substituted off) 58'
FF	14	Ciarán Kilkenny
CF	15	Dean Rock	(substituted off) 67'
Substitutes:
GK	16	Evan Comerford
FW	17	Paddy Andrews
FW	18	Colm Basquel
FW	19	Cormac Costello	(substituted on) 52'
DF	20	Darren Daly	(substituted on) 58'
DF	21	Michael Fitzsimons	(substituted on) 26'
FW	22	Paul Flynn
DF	23	Eric Lowndes	(substituted on) 63'
MF	24	Michael Darragh MacAuley	(substituted on) 67'
FW	25	Kevin McManamon	(substituted on) 58'
FW	26	Eoghan O'Gara
Manager:
Jim Gavin

GK	1	Niall Morgan
CB	2	Michael McKernan
FB	3	Ronan McNamee
CB	4	Pádraig Hampsey
WB	5	Tiernan McCann	(yellow card) 18'
HB	18	Rory Brennan
WB	7	Peter Harte
MF	8	Colm Cavanagh
MF	9	Cathal McShane	(substituted off) 55'
WF	10	Mattie Donnelly (c)
HF	11	Niall Sludden	(substituted off) 46'
WF	12	Kieran McGeary	49'
CF	13	Mark Bradley	(substituted off) 64'
FF	25	Conor Meyler	(substituted off) 39'
CF	15	Connor McAliskey	(substituted off) 49'
Substitutes:
GK	16	Michael O'Neill
DF	6	Frank Burns	(substituted on) 46'
FW	14	Richard Donnelly	(substituted on) 49'
FW	17	Lee Brennan	(substituted on) 39'
DF	19	Michael Cassidy
FW	20	Harry Loughran	(substituted on) 49'
MF	21	Conal McCann
FW	22	Declan McClure	(substituted on) 55'
DF	23	Aidan McCrory
DF	24	HP McGeary
FW	26	Ronan O'Neill	(substituted on) 64'
Manager:
Mickey Harte

Man of the Match:
Jack McCaffrey

=== Trophy presentation ===
Dublin captain Stephen Cluxton accepted the Sam Maguire Cup from GAA president John Horan in the Hogan Stand.

=== Reaction ===
Highlights of the final were shown on The Sunday Game programme, which aired at 9:30 pm that night on RTÉ2 and was presented by Des Cahill. Paul Mannion, Jack McCaffrey and Ciarán Kilkenny were shortlisted for the Man of the Match award. The winner was Jack McCaffrey with GAA president John Horan presenting the award at the Dublin post match function, held in the Gibson Hotel.

=== Celebrations ===
The Dublin team had a homecoming celebration the day after the final at Smithfield in Dublin which started at 6:30 pm with Marty Morrissey as MC. The night before, players and their management team celebrated their win at The Gibson Hotel.

== See also ==
- Tír Eoghain: The Unbreakable Bond, a documentary shown one week in advance of the game
