= Peter Keane (Gaelic footballer) =

Irish Gaelic footballer and manager

Peter Keane (born 1971) is an Irish Gaelic football manager and former player. He has been manager of the senior Clare county team since 2024, having previously managed his native Kerry between 2018 and 2021. As a player, he lined out with South Kerry Championship club St Mary's.

Keane is one of nine children. Both of his parents ran the Ringside Rest Hotel in Cahersiveen. His father Tom was a builder who spent time as chairman of the South Kerry board. Peter Keane played football in the late 1980s and early 1990s. He played for St Mary's alongside fellow forward Maurice Fitzgerald. In 1988, the pair won a Kerry under-21 title for South Kerry. However, his county career was limited to minor (1989), county junior (1990) and under-21 (captaining the 1992 team to a Munster title).

He spent four years working in a bank before departing to work in retail in Killorglin. He is considered shrewd. In 2009, he managed Beaufort's junior footballers past his own St Mary's club in the county semi-final and led them to victory over Dromid in the final. He began managing his native club St Mary's in 2010, travelling down from Killorglin especially to do so, and led them to victory in the South Kerry final. Keane's younger brother Ray was playing for the team, this before his own foray into management with St Finbarr's. After leading St Mary's to the 2011 All-Ireland Junior Club Football Championship, Keane joined Kerry's youth development system and managed the Kerry under-16s. County minor manager Mickey O'Sullivan brought him in as a selector in 2011, telling The Kerryman newspaper: "Nobody knows more than Peter does". This was accidental, only coming about because Seán O'Sullivan left a vacancy by coming out of retirement to play for Kerry.

Keane stayed with the Kerry minor team for two years before joining the Killarney-based Legion club as its manager. He led Legion to the final of the Kerry Senior Football Championship in 2015, the club's first since 1946, and experienced a narrow loss. He then managed the Kerry minor team to three consecutive All-Ireland titles between 2016 and 2018. Following the resignation of Kerry senior manager Éamonn Fitzmaurice after the county's loss to Kildare in the 2018 All-Ireland Senior Football Championship, Keane was approached to succeed Fitzmaurice. He did so, and recalled Tommy Walsh, Jonathan Lyne and Jack Sherwood to the county team in his first season, and also bringing in Tommy Griffin and Jason Foley from the minor team, as well as old club-mate Maurice Fitzgerald. Kerry were beaten only twice in the 2019 National Football League (both times by Mayo, including the final), and took Dublin to a replay of the 2019 All-Ireland Senior Football Championship final.

After losing to Cork in the 2020 Munster Senior Football Championship semi-final, Keane climbed Carrauntoohil; there he fell and was rescued by helicopter, requiring surgery on his shoulder after being airlifted to hospital. Keane spoke about the incident ahead of his county's 2021 National Football League opening game against Galway, saying: "I had a very innocuous fall, it was just a slip, and I put my hand back to save myself and unfortunately I dislocated my shoulder".

In November 2024, Keane was ratified as manager of the Clare senior team, subsequently departing from the role in August 2025.

== Honours ==
=== Player ===
Kerry

- Munster Under-21 Football Championship (1): 1992
- Munster Minor Football Championship (1): 1989

=== Manager ===
St Mary's

- All-Ireland Junior Club Football Championship (1): 2011
- Munster Junior Club Football Championship (1): 2010
- Kerry Junior Football Championship (1): 2010

Kerry

- Munster Senior Football Championship (1): 2019
- All-Ireland Minor Football Championship (3): 2016, 2017, 2018
- Munster Minor Football Championship (3): 2016, 2017, 2018

Sporting positions
Preceded by Jack O'Connor	Kerry Minor Football Manager; 2015–2018	Succeeded by James Costello
Preceded by Éamonn Fitzmaurice	Kerry Senior Football Manager; 2018–2021	Succeeded by Jack O'Connor
Preceded by Mark Fitzgerald	Clare Senior Football Manager; 2024–	Succeeded by Incumbent
Achievements
Preceded by Ger O'Callaghan	All-Ireland Club JFC winning manager 2011	Succeeded by Steven Joyce
Preceded by Jack O'Connor	All-Ireland MFC winning manager 2016–2018	Succeeded by Bobbie O'Dwyer
