= 2025 Ulster Senior Football Championship =

Gaelic football tournament

2025 Ulster SFC
Tournament details
- Province: Ulster
- Year: 2025
- Trophy: Anglo-Celt Cup
- Date: April – May 2025
- Teams: 9
- Defending champions: Donegal

Winners
- Champions: Donegal (12th win)
- Manager: Jim McGuinness
- Captain: Patrick McBrearty

Runners-up
- Runners-up: Armagh
- Manager: Kieran McGeeney
- Captain: Aidan Forker

Other
- Matches played: 8
- Total scored: 10–358 (388)
- Top Scorer: Patrick McBrearty 1-18
- Website: Ulster GAA

The 2025 Ulster Senior Football Championship was the 137th instalment of the annual Ulster Senior Football Championship organised by Ulster GAA. It was one of the four provincial competitions of the 2025 All-Ireland Senior Football Championship. The draw for the championship was made on 12 October 2024. Donegal retained their title by beating Armagh in the final on 10 May.

== Antrim v Armagh dispute ==
At the draw made in October 2024, Antrim was drawn first against defending All-Ireland champions Armagh, granting them home advantage; however, Ulster GAA stated that Antrim's proposed home ground Corrigan Park, with its capacity of less than 4,000 would be unsuitable to host the match. Instead, Ulster GAA initially fixed the game for Páirc Esler, the home ground of Down GAA, but a stadium located primarily in County Armagh.

A campaign by Antrim GAA, alongside support from the Gaelic Players Association, which included a threatened boycott of the game, was ultimately successful, with Ulster GAA agreeing to host the game at the West Belfast venue.

== Draw ==
=== Bracket ===
Preliminary round
6 April, Ballybofey
Donegal	1-25
Derry	1-15

Quarter-finals
20 April, Clones
Monaghan	0-21
Donegal	0-23
19 April, Enniskillen
Fermanagh	0-23
Down	2-19
12 April, Belfast
Antrim	1-23
Armagh	1-34
13 April, Omagh
Tyrone	1-24
Cavan	0-20

Semi-finals
27 April, Clones
Donegal	1-19
Down	0-16
26 April, Clones
Armagh	0-23
Tyrone	0-22

Final
11 May, Clones
Donegal (a.e.t.)	2-23
Armagh	0-28

== Preliminary round ==
6 April 2025 Preliminary round	Donegal	1–25 – 1–15	Derry	Ballybofey
2.00pm				Venue: MacCumhaill Park
	Gls: D. Ó Baoill; Pts: D. Ó Baoill 4 (2 tp), P. McBrearty 7 (3 fs); P. Mogan, C. O’Donnell, S. O’Donnell C. Moore, M. Murphy (1f) 2 each; F. Roarty, R. McHugh, J. Brennan, O. Gallen, 1 each.	Report	Gls: B. Rogers 5 (2 tp), S. McGuigan 4fs, L. Murray 2 (1f), C. Doherty 2 (1tp); P. McGrogan, N. Toner 1 each. Pts: D. Higgins 1	Referee: Brendan Cawley (Kildare); Attendance: 15,023

== Quarter-finals ==
12 April 2025 Quarter-final	Antrim	1–23 – 1–34	Armagh	Belfast
12:00pm				Venue: Corrigan Park
	Gls: R McQuillan 1 Pts: P McBride 9 (3tp, 1f), R McQuillan 5 (1tp), D McEnhill 4 (tp, tpf), M Byrne 2 ('45); M Jordan, E Quinn, R Boyle 1 each.	Report	Gls: T McCormack 1 Pts: R Grugan 8 (1tpf, 4f), O O'Neill 6 (3tpf), C O'Neill 4; E Rafferty 3, (1tpf), R McQuillan 3; G McCabe and C McConville 2 each; T McCormack, A Murnin, D McMullan, A Forker, B McCambridge, J Hall 1 each.	Referee: Barry Cassidy (Derry)

13 April 2025 Quarter-final	Tyrone	1–24 – 0–20	Cavan	Omagh
4.15pm				Venue: Healy Park
	Gls: C Kilpatrick (1); Pts: N Morgan 1 ('45); A Clarke, P Teague 1, N Devlin 1, M McKernan 1, K McGeary 3; B Kennedy 1; A Donaghy 1, P Harte 1, C Daly 1; D McCurry 7 (2f), C McShane 2, R Canavan 4 (4f)	Report	Pts: O Kiernan 3 (1tp), D McVeety 8 (1tpf, 1tp, 1f); C Madden 3 (1tpf), S McEvoy 4 (3f), R Donohue 1, R O’Neill 1O Kiernan 3 (1tp), D McVeety 8 (1tpf, 1tp, 1f); C Madden 3 (1tpf), S McEvoy 4 (3f), R Donohue 1, R O’Neill 1	Referee: Martin McNally (Monaghan); Attendance: 6,791

19 April 2025 Quarter-final	Fermanagh	0-23 – 2-19	Down	Enniskillen
				Venue: Brewster Park
		Report		Referee: J Henry (Mayo); Attendance: 4,157

20 April 2025 Quarter-final	Monaghan	0–21 – 0–23	Donegal	Clones
				Venue: St Tiernach's Park
		Report		Attendance: 16,120

== Semi-finals ==
26 April 2025 Semi-final	Armagh	0-23 – 0–22	Tyrone	Clones
16:45				Venue: St Tiernach’s Park
		Report		Referee: David Gough (Meath); Attendance: 21,288

27 April 2025 Semi-final	Down	0–16 – 1–19	Donegal	Clones
15:00				Venue: St Tiernach’s Park
		Report		Attendance: 9,221; TV: BBC

== Final ==
10 May 2025 Final	Armagh	0–28 – 2–23	Donegal	Clones
17:25				Venue: St Tiernach's Park
	Gls: E Rafferty (0-03,1’45, 1tpf); R McQuillan (0-03), J Og Burns (0-01); C O’Neill (0-01), B Crealey (0-01); O Conaty (0-06); A Murnin (0-01), O O’Neill (0-07, 1tp, 1tpf).	Report	Gls: H McFadden (0-01); C Moore (1-01); C Thompson (0-04, 2tp), M Langan (0-02); D O Baoill (0-01), H McFadden (1-00), S O’Donnell; P McBrearty (0-03, 3f), M Murphy (0-03), O Gallen (0-04).	Referee: Brendan Cawley (Kildare); Attendance: 28,788

== Stadia and attendance ==
County	Location	Province	Stadium	Capacity
Antrim	Belfast	Ulster	Corrigan Park	3,700
Armagh	Armagh	Ulster	Athletic Grounds	18,500
Cavan	Cavan	Ulster	Breffni Park	25,030
Derry	Derry	Ulster	Celtic Park	18,500
Donegal	Ballybofey	Ulster	MacCumhaill Park	17,500
Down	Newry	Ulster	Páirc Esler	20,000
Fermanagh	Enniskillen	Ulster	Brewster Park	20,000
Monaghan	Clones	Ulster	St Tiernach's Park	29,000
Tyrone	Omagh	Ulster	Healy Park	17,636

Total attendance*	101,388
Average attendance*	14,484
Highest attendance	28,788; Armagh 0–28 – 2–23 Donegal; 10 May 2025
*Excludes 1 matches (Antrim vs Armagh) in which no attendance was reported

== See also ==
- Newbridge or Nowhere: a similar dispute over venues during the 2018 All-Ireland Senior Football Championship
