= 2018 Ulster Senior Football Championship =

2018 Ulster SFC
Tournament details
- Year: 2018
- Trophy: Anglo-Celt Cup

Winners
- Champions: Donegal (9th win)
- Manager: Declan Bonner
- Captain: Michael Murphy

Runners-up
- Runners-up: Fermanagh
- Manager: Rory Gallagher
- Captain: Eoin Donnelly

The 2018 Ulster Senior Football Championship was the 130th instalment of the annual Ulster Senior Football Championship organised by Ulster GAA. It is one of the four provincial competitions of the 2018 All-Ireland Senior Football Championship. The winners receive The Anglo-Celt Cup. The draw for the championship was made on 19 October 2017.

Tyrone were the defending champions, though were eliminated in the quarter-finals. The championship was won by Donegal who defeated Fermanagh in the final. Donegal full-forward Patrick McBrearty suffered a season-ending cruciate ligament injury in the final. DUP leader Arlene Foster notably attended the final.

== Teams ==
The Ulster championship is contested by the nine county teams in the province of Ulster.

Team	Colours	Sponsor	Manager	Captain	Most recent success
Team	Colours	Sponsor	Manager	Captain	All-Ireland	Provincial
Antrim	Saffron and white	Creagh Concrete	Lenny Harbinson	Kevin O’Boyle		1951
Armagh	Orange and white	Simply Fruit	Kieran McGeeney	Rory Grugan	2002	2008
Cavan	Royal blue and white	Kingspan Group	Mattie McGleenan	Dara McVeety	1952	1997
Derry	Red and white	H&A Mechanical Services	Damian McErlain	Enda Lynn	1993	1998
Donegal	Gold and green	KN Group	Declan Bonner	Michael Murphy	2012	2018
Down	Red and black	EOS IT Solutions	Éamonn Burns	Darren O'Hagan	1994	1994
Fermanagh	Green and white	Tracey Concrete	Rory Gallagher	Eoin Donnelly
Monaghan	White and blue	Investec	Malachy O'Rourke	Colin Walshe		2015
Tyrone	White and Red	McAleer & Rushe	Mickey Harte	Mattie Donnelly	2008	2017

== Championship draw ==
Preliminary round
Donegal	2-20
Cavan	1-15

Quarter-finals
Fermanagh	0-12
Armagh	0-7
Tyrone	1-16
Monaghan	1-18
Down	1-18
Antrim	0-14
Derry	0-16
Donegal	2-16

Semi-finals
Fermanagh	1-8
Monaghan	0-10
Down	1-12
Donegal	2-22

Final
Fermanagh	0-12
Donegal	2-18

=== Preliminary round ===
BBC
deferred

13 May 2018
4:00 pm
Preliminary round

Report

Donegal	2-20 (26) – (18) 1-15	Cavan
(HT: 1-10 – 1-06)
Gls: R. McHugh 1, C. Mulligan 1 Pts: M. Murphy 6 (3f), P. McBrearty 4, C. Thompson 3, M. Langan 3, J. Brennan 2, C. Ward 1, L. McLoone 1		Gls: C. O'Reilly 1 Pts: G. McKiernan 7 (2f), C. O'Reilly 3 (3f), C. Mackey 2 (1f), N. Murray 1, B. Magee 1, A. Cole 1

Páirc MacCumhaill, Ballybofey
Referee: David Gough (Meath)
Attendance: 9,612

=== Quarter-finals ===
BBC iPlayer

19 May 2018
7:00 pm
Quarter-Final A

Report

Fermanagh	0-12 (12) – (7) 0-7	Armagh
(HT: 0-06 – 0-04)
Pts: Seamus Quigley 6 (5f), R Jones 2, B Mulrone 1, L Cullen 1 D McCusker 1, Seán Quigley 1		Pts: R Grugan 3, E Rafferty 2 (1f), M Shields 1, G McParland 1

Brewster Park, Enniskillen
Referee: Paddy Neilan (Roscommon)
Attendance: 8,421

BBC
deferred

20 May 2018
4:30 pm
Quarter-Final B

Report

Tyrone	1-16 (19) – (21) 1-18	Monaghan
(HT: 0-08 – 1-07)
Gls: M McKernan 1 Pts: C McAliskey 6 (3f), L Brennan 3 (3f), N Sludden 2, M McKernan 1, M Donnelly 1, P Harte 1, C McShane 1, P Hampsey 1		Gls: V Corey 1 Pts: C McManus 6 (4f), R Beggan 4 (2f, 2 '45), J McCarron 2 (1f), D Mone 1, F Kelly 1, R McAnespie 1, D Wylie 1, C McCarthy 1, C Walshe 0-1

Healy Park, Omagh
Referee: David Coldrick (Meath)
Attendance: 15,029

BBC iPlayer

26 May 2018
7:00 pm
Quarter-Final C

Report

Down	1-18 (21) – (14) 0-14	Antrim
(HT: 1-09 – 0-05)
Gls: K McKernan 1 Pts: D O'Hare 7 (5f), A Doherty 3 (3f), S Millar 2, S Dornan 2, B McArdle 1, C Mooney 1, K McKernan 1, C Harrison 1		Pts: P McBride 4 (2f), C Murray 4 (1f), R Murray 2 (1f), M Fitzpatrick 1, C Duffin 1

Páirc Esler, Newry
Referee: Derek O'Mahony (Tipperary)
Attendance: 5,589

BBC
deferred

27 May 2018
4:00 pm
Quarter-Final D

Report

Derry	0-16 (16) – (22) 2-16	Donegal
(HT: 0-07 – 1-10)
Pts: E Bradley 8 (5f), M Lynch 5 (4f), J Kielt 2, N Toner 1		Gls: H McFadden 1, C Mulligan 1 Pts: P McBrearty 8 (3f), L McLoone 3, M Murphy 2 (1 '45), R McHugh 2, J Brennan (0-01)

Celtic Park, Derry
Referee: Maurice Deegan (Laois)
Attendance: 9,356

=== Semi-finals ===
RTÉ
BBC

3 June 2018
2:00 pm
Semi-Final 1

Report

Fermanagh	1-08 (11) – (10) 0-10	Monaghan
(HT: 0-06 – 0-04)
Gls: E Donnelly 1 Pts: A Breen 2, Seán Quigley 3 (3f), C Jones 1, T Corrigan 2 (2f)		Pts: C McManus 5 (5f), D Wylie 2, F Kelly 1, R McAnespie 1, C Walshe 1

Healy Park, Omagh
Referee: Conor Lane (Cork)
Attendance: 10,122

BBC
deferred

10 June 2018
4:00 pm
Semi-Final 2

Report

Down	1-12 (15) – (28) 2-22	Donegal
(HT: 0-07 – 1-12)
Gls: N Donnelly 1 Pts: D O'Hare 4 (3f), C Harrison 4, C Maginn 2, C Mooney 1, N Donnelly 1		Gls: L McLoone 1, J Brennan 1 Pts: P McBrearty 6 (3f), M Murphy 5 (3f), J Brennan 3, P Brennan 2, R McHugh 2, C Ward 1, C Thompson 1, S McMenamin 1, M McHugh 1

St Tiernach's Park, Clones
Referee: Anthony Nolan (Wicklow)
Attendance: 12,051

=== Final ===
RTÉ
BBC

24 June 2018
2:00pm
Ulster Final

Report

Fermanagh	0-12 (12) – (24) 2-18	Donegal
(HT: 0-05 – 2-07)
Pts: Seán Quigley 5 (5f), Seamus Quigley 3 (1f), B Mulrone 1, E Donnelly 1, C Jones 1, C Corrigan 1		Gls: EB Gallagher 1, R McHugh 1 Pts: M Murphy 4 (3f), C Thompson 3 (1f), P Brennan 2, P McGrath 1, EB Gallagher 1, O MacNiallais 1, M Langan 1, P McBrearty 1, J Brennan 1, M McHugh 1, D O'Connor 1

St Tiernach's Park, Clones
Referee: David Gough (Meath)
Attendance: 28,150

== 2018 Irish News Ulster Allstars ==
1. Rory Beggan (Monaghan)
2. Pádraig Hampsey (Tyrone)
3. Drew Wylie (Monaghan)
4. Ryan Wylie (Monaghan)
5. Eoghan Bán Gallagher (Donegal)
6. Mattie Donnelly (Tyrone)
7. Karl O'Connell (Monaghan)
8. Colm Cavanagh (Tyrone)
9. Michael Murphy (Donegal)
10. Ryan McAnespie (Monaghan)
11. Niall Sludden (Tyrone)
12. Ryan McHugh (Donegal)
13. Connor McAliskey (Tyrone)
14. Seán Quigley (Fermanagh)
15. Conor McManus (Monaghan)

== See also ==
- 2018 All-Ireland Senior Football Championship
  - 2018 Connacht Senior Football Championship
  - 2018 Leinster Senior Football Championship
  - 2018 Munster Senior Football Championship
