= Jack McCaffrey =

Dublin Gaelic footballer

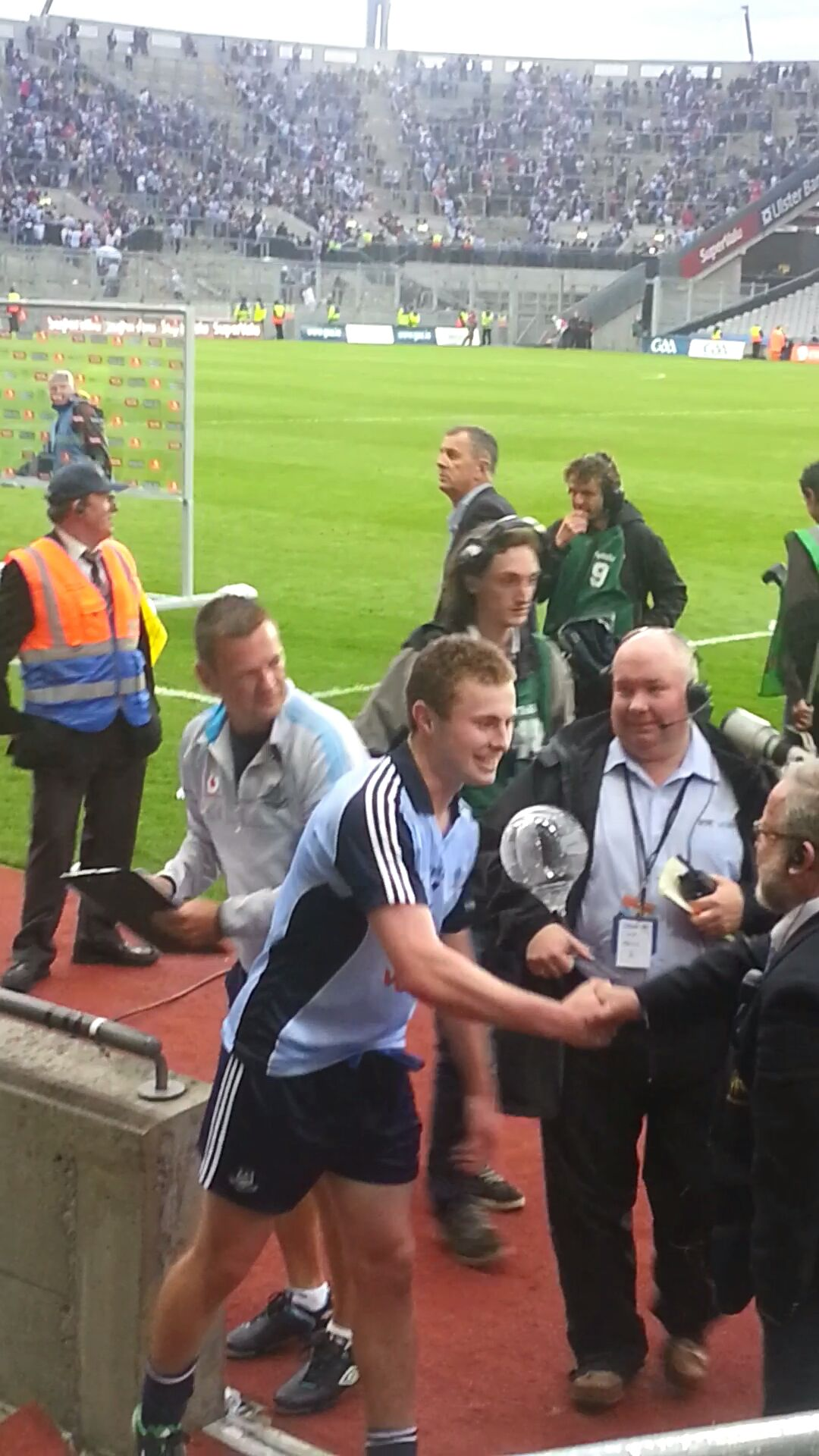

Personal information
- Native name: Seán Mac Gafraidh (Irish)
- Nickname: Dart from Clontarf
- Born: 19 October 1993 (age 33) Dublin, Ireland
- Occupation: Doctor
- Height: 1.8 m (5 ft 11 in)

Sport
- Sport: Gaelic football
- Position: Left half-back
Club
- Years: Club
- Clontarf
Inter-county
Years	County	Apps (scores)
2013–2024	Dublin	40 (4–17)
Inter-county titles
- Leinster titles: 8
- All-Irelands: 6
- NFL: 3
- All Stars: 4

Jack McCaffrey (born 19 October 1993) is a Gaelic footballer who plays for Clontarf.

== Early and personal life ==
His father Noel also represented Dublin in football. McCaffrey attended Belvedere College private school and studied medicine at University College Dublin (UCD) and graduated in 2018 with a Bachelor of Medicine, Bachelor of Surgery & Bachelor in the Art of Obstetrics. His classmates included Mark English, considered by Jerry Kiernan to be the country's "greatest talent" ever in middle-distance running. English issued a challenge to McCaffrey, himself considered football's fastest player, to take him on over 100 metres.

McCaffrey is a qualified medical doctor. He works in Temple Street Children's Hospital.

He is an opponent of professionalism within the GAA.

== Playing career ==
In April 2013, McCaffrey won a National Football League winners' medal as Dublin defeated Tyrone by 0–18 to 0–17 to win the 2013 National Football League. He made his championship debut against Westmeath in the 2013 Leinster Senior Football Championship. He scored a solo goal in the 2013 All-Ireland quarter-final against Cork. Still teenaged, he played in the 2013 All-Ireland Senior Football Championship Final, the first such final he would play in. McCaffrey, who was substituted at half-time, recalled how he "got roasted by Kevin McLoughlin". He played twice and netted for Ireland against Australia in the 2013 International Rules Series. In November 2013, he was named as GAA/GPA Young Footballer of the Year.

In November 2015, McCaffrey received the highest individual honour in the sport when he was named as GAA/GPA Footballer of the Year. He did so in spite of contracting food poisoning "in around the Thursday" before the 2015 All-Ireland Senior Football Championship Final, which left him unable to finish the game. "I couldn't keep any food or water down so I got a drip to stay hydrated. But that was actually great at the time because it completely distracted from the build-up to a final ... all you were worried about is, 'Am I going to be okay?' You're no thinking about the occasion itself. And then thankfully I pulled through and performed okay for the 50 minutes that I lasted".

McCaffrey missed the 2016 All-Ireland Senior Football Championship due his travels abroad. He travelled to Ethiopia, then Kenya, Zambia, Malawi and Tanzania.

In December 2016, McCaffrey confirmed that he would be available again for selection in 2017.

McCaffrey played in that year's All-Ireland final win but left the pitch early after sustaining what later proved to be an anterior cruciate ligament injury. His antics later in the evening as Michael Lyster interviewed Jim Gavin and Stephen Cluxton were much remarked upon. A month after the final, McCaffrey had surgery.

McCaffrey returned for Dublin against Longford as a substitute in June 2018. Another substitute appearance in the Leinster final against Laois followed, seeing him make two goal chances by himself. However, he did not find the net in that game.

He is a former self-admitted "horrific tackler" but the 2018 All-Ireland Senior Football Championship Final proved to be when he "figured out I'm actually a defender as opposed to some loose attacking player". His dispossession of Mattie Donnelly during injury time of that game offered evidence of this.

McCaffrey was named Man of the Match after his team's 2018 final victory. While being interviewed by Lyster for The Sunday Game highlights programme, a leak through the ceiling of the Gibson Hotel caused Lyster, McCaffrey and GAA President John Horan to be drenched in water live on air.

Interviewed the following day by journalists, McCaffrey reminded them: "This was the first time I've been on the pitch when the final whistle blew in an All-Ireland final. Incredible. It was so satisfying, such a relief."

Another All Star followed, as did a second Footballer of the Year nomination.

McCaffrey won the man of the match award in the drawn 2019 All-Ireland Senior Football Championship Final as well; a second consecutive award, "RTÉ veterans" were reported to be finding it difficult to recall such an occurrence ever before. He was top scorer (1–3) from open play. This compared with the 3–14 from his previous 38 championship games. The three points were also a classic hat-trick, sent over with fist and both feet. Defensively, he forced eight turnovers of possession.

McCaffrey left the Dublin panel ahead of the 2020 All-Ireland Senior Football Championship. He later described the drawn 2019 All-Ireland Senior Football Championship Final as the game that "broke me" but decided initially to remain when his former minor and under-21 manager Dessie Farrell was appointed as Jim Gavin's successor.

He returned to the Dublin panel in 2023, but left the panel again at the end of the 2024 season.

== Honours ==
=== Team ===
- All-Ireland Senior Football Championship (6): 2013, 2015, 2017, 2018, 2019, 2023
- Leinster Senior Football Championship (9): 2013, 2014, 2015, 2017, 2018, 2019, 2020, 2023, 2024
- National Football League (3): 2013, 2014, 2015
- All-Ireland Under-21 Football Championship (2): 2012, 2014 (c)
- Leinster Under-21 Football Championship (2): 2012, 2014

=== Individual ===
- All-Ireland Senior Football Championship Final Man of the Match (2): 2018, 2019 (drawn game)
- The Sunday Game Player of the Year (1): 2015
- GAA/GPA Young Footballer of the Year (1): 2013
- GAA/GPA Footballer of the Year (1): 2015
- GAA GPA All Stars Awards (4): 2015, 2017, 2018, 2019
- UCD Alumni Award Winner Sport 2020

Achievements
Preceded by Fiontán Ó Curraoin (Galway)	All-Ireland Under-21 Football Final winning captain 2014	Succeeded by Kieran McGeary (Tyrone)
Awards
Preceded by Cillian O'Connor (Mayo)	GAA/GPA Young Footballer of the Year; 2013	Succeeded by Ryan McHugh (Donegal)
Preceded by James O'Donoghue (Kerry)	GAA/GPA Footballer of the Year; 2015	Succeeded by Lee Keegan (Mayo)
Preceded by James McCarthy (Dublin)	All-Ireland Senior Football Final; Man of the Match; 2018, 2019 (drawn game)	Succeeded by Ciarán Kilkenny (Dublin)
