= Tír Eoghain: The Unbreakable Bond =

Sports television documentary

- Genre: Documentary
- Directed by: Declan McGrath
- Starring: Peter Canavan; Mark Harte; Mickey Harte; Kevin Hughes; Owen Mulligan; Brian McGuigan; Enda McGinley

Production
- Producers: Eamonn Mallie; Michael Mallie
- Running time: 56 minutes

Original release
- Network: TG4
- Release: 26 August 2018

Tír Eoghain: The Unbreakable Bond is a documentary about the minor Tyrone county football team of 1997 and 1998, which featured many of the players (and the manager) who won three All-Ireland Senior Football Championships in the following decade. It also recounts the death of youth player Paul McGirr from injuries sustained during an Ulster Minor Football Championship game in June 1997.

TG4 first aired it on 26 August 2018. It was shown one week in advance of the 2018 All-Ireland Senior Football Championship Final, which featured Tyrone. TG4 produced it with the help of Northern Ireland Screen.

BBC Two aired it on 12 May 2019 and then again on 11 August 2019.
