= Newbridge or Nowhere =

2018 Gaelic football controversy

"Newbridge or Nowhere" (Irish: Droichead Nua nó Áit ar Bith) is a name for the controversy surrounding a Gaelic football match played in the 2018 All-Ireland Senior Football Championship between Kildare and Mayo at St Conleth's Park in Newbridge, County Kildare on 30 June 2018.

Kildare won the game, and by doing so knocked Mayo out of the championship. A "shock" result, it was Mayo's earliest championship exit since 2010. The events brought excitement to an otherwise forgettable championship.

== Background ==
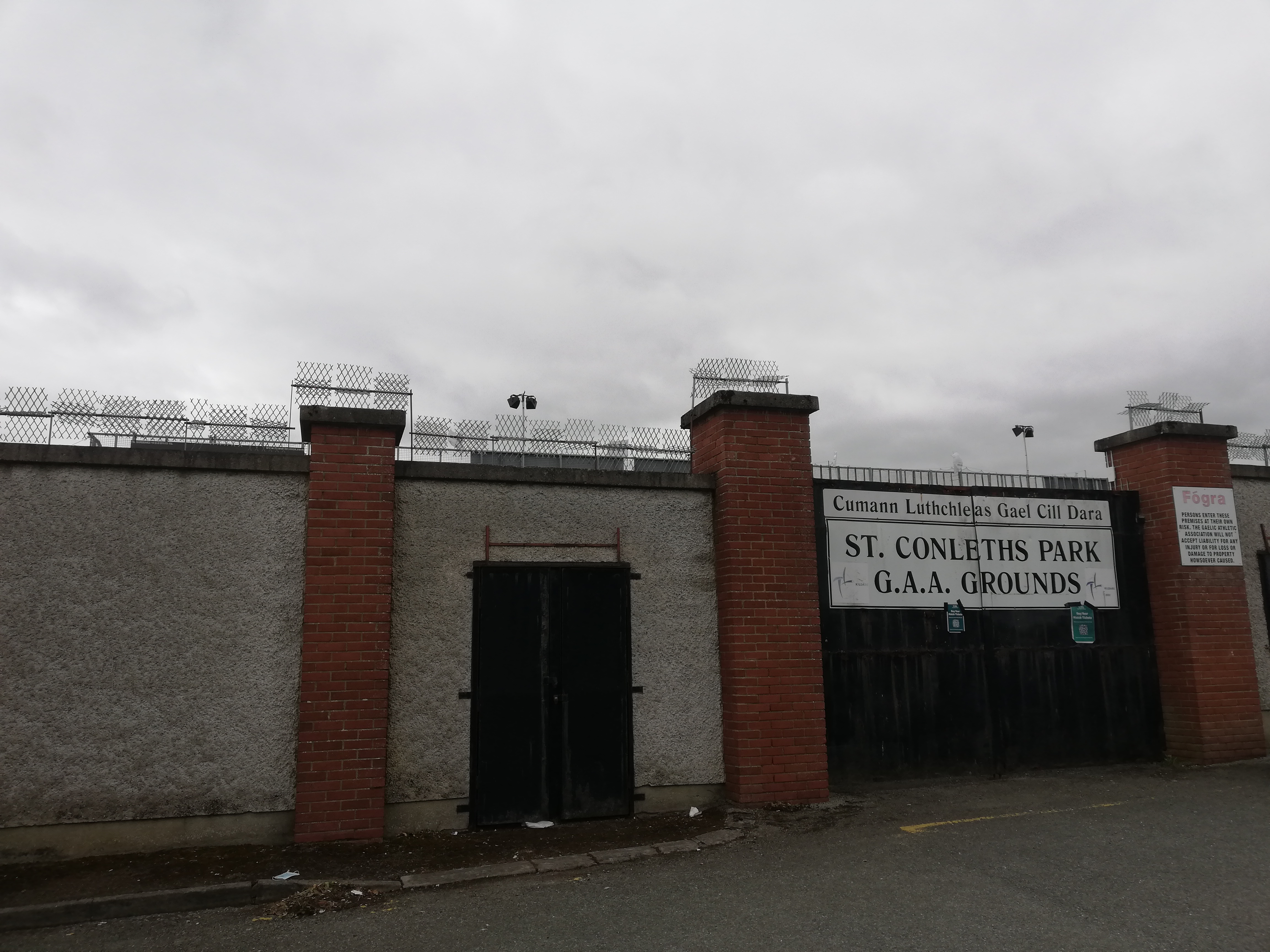
Entrance to St Conleth's Park

Mayo had had some recent success at the time, with Stephen Rochford leading his team to the All-Ireland Senior Football Championship final in 2016 and again in 2017. Kildare had been relegated to Division 3 of the National Football League, before being knocked out of the 2018 Leinster Senior Football Championship by Carlow, with Cian O'Neill expected not to last much longer as manager. Kildare came out first in the draw so were entitled to a home game, after playing two away games.

At the time of the match, St Conleth's Park was one of the smallest county grounds in the GAA. It was built to hold roughly 13,000 spectators but by 2012 its capacity was more than halved, to 6,200, following a building code audit.

== Events ==
Kildare's county board were in contact with the Gardaí in Newbridge, where there were concerns about health and safety, and the Irish Derby, which was also scheduled for Kildare that day. The GAA wanted Kildare to nominate a second venue. Manager Cian O'Neill said no and insisted on this "for the bones of three or four hours". The GAA took it out of Kildare's hands by announcing at 1:30 pm on the Monday after the draw was made that the game would be played at Croke Park, alongside a game between Cavan and Tyrone.

Kildare refused to play at Croke Park. O'Neill phoned Kevin McStay for advice – McStay, who was a former Mayo player, had been in charge of Roscommon that year, when they had stood up to Connacht GAA officials so they could have the 2018 Connacht Senior Football Championship final at Dr Hyde Park.

RTÉ's GAA correspondent Marty Morrissey then suggested O'Neill allow himself be interviewed onto RTÉ News: Six One. O'Neill said later: "I was in work at a quarter to six and he just rang... I was just trying to put a written statement together. And I said 'I'm here in work'. He said 'Can you get into the studio in Cork?'. I didn't even know there was a studio in Cork".

The campaign to have the game played outside Croke Park featured in headlines of print, radio and television, as well as social media. A mural outside St Conleth's Park included the words "Newbridge or Nowhere". T-shirts and flags also featured in the campaign.

The GAA refused to budge. There were threats of boycotts and Kildare being expelled from the competition. Eventually the GAA gave in and allowed the game to be played in Newbridge.

== Match ==
Sky Sports had live broadcast rights for the game.

=== Summary ===
Kildare knocked Mayo out of the championship. It was Mayo's earliest championship exit since 2010.

=== Details ===
| 30 June 2018; 19:00 IST (UTC+1); Round 3 | Kildare | 0–21 – 0–19 (21) – (19) | Mayo | St Conleth's Park, Newbridge; Referee: David Gough (Meath) |
| 30 June 2018; 19:00 IST (UTC+1); Round 3 | | Report | | St Conleth's Park, Newbridge; Referee: David Gough (Meath) |

== Outcome ==
Kildare qualified for the Super 8s by beating Fermanagh in the next game. But they finished bottom of Group 1 with no points.

== Legacy ==
In August 2018, it was announced that St Conleth's Park was to get a facelift. Renovations were finally completed in 2024 including a new, 3,000-seat main stand and LED floodlights; final capacity of the rebuilt St Conleth's stands at 15,000.

An episode of Scannal was broadcast on the TV in 2021 dedicated to "Newbridge or Nowhere". The phrase "Newbridge or Nowhere" was still referenced in articles in the Irish Independent up to 2019 and 2022.

A similar dispute involving Antrim's entitlement to a home game against the then All-Ireland champion Armagh during the 2025 Ulster Senior Football Championship was referred to as "Corrigan or Nowhere"; it lasted for much longer than the original.
