= Mark Bradley (Gaelic footballer) =

Irish Gaelic footballer

Personal information
- Born: 1994 or 1995 (age 31–32)
- Height: 5 ft 7 in (170 cm)

Sport
- Sport: Gaelic football
- Position: Forward
Clubs
- Years: Club
- c. 2010s– c. 2019: Killyclogher; Donegal Boston
Inter-county
- Years: County
- 2015–2021: Tyrone
Inter-county titles
- Ulster titles: 3
- All-Irelands: 1

Mark Bradley (born 1994/5) is a Gaelic footballer who plays for Killyclogher and formerly of the Tyrone county team. He is a playmaker, at corner-forward for his club.

Bradley won a Tyrone Senior Football Championship with his club in 2016.

He won the 2015 All-Ireland Under-21 Football Championship and Ulster Under-21 Football Championship with his county.

Bradley made his senior inter-county debut in a National Football League game against Dublin at Croke Park.

He played in the 2018 All-Ireland Senior Football Championship Final, where he was the only change announced in advance from the semi-final.

He spent a year abroad in 2019. During that time he played for Donegal Boston.
