= 2016 All-Ireland Minor Football Championship =

Gaelic football competition

2016 All-Ireland Senior Football Championship
Championship details
- Dates: April — 18 September 2016
- Teams: 32

All-Ireland Champions
- Winning team: Kerry (14th win)

All-Ireland Finalists
- Losing team: Galway

Provincial Champions
- Munster: Kerry
- Leinster: Kildare
- Ulster: Donegal
- Connacht: Galway

Championship statistics

The 2016 All-Ireland Minor Football Championship was the GAA's premier inter-county gaelic football competition for under 18's. 32 teams took part.

The winners receive the Tom Markham Cup.

The defending champions were Kerry who defeated Tipperary in the 2015 final.

Kerry beat Galway 3–07 to 0–09 in the final on 18 September 2016 for their third consecutive championship.

== Teams ==
Thirty two teams contest the championship. New York and London do not participate in this competition. Kilkenny fielded a team in 2016 despite not having participated in 2015.

== Format ==
Provincial Championships

Connacht, Leinster, Munster and Ulster organise four provincial championships. Each province determines the format for deciding their champions and may be league, group, knock-out, double-elimination, etc. or a combination. For clarity, the format is explained in the provincial sections below.

All-Ireland

The four provincial winners play the four provincial runners-up in the All-Ireland quarter finals. Two semi-finals follow and a final which is normally played before the All-Ireland senior final on the third Sunday in September. All matches are knock-out.

== Provincial championships ==
=== Connacht Minor Football Championship ===
==== Connacht Format ====
All five Connacht counties compete in a straight knock-out format.

==== Connacht Main Draw ====
Quarter-Finals
Roscommon
Sligo

Semi-Finals
Roscommon | 1-7
Galway | 3-11
Mayo | 4-11
Leitrim | 1-8

Connacht Final
Galway | 1-9
Mayo | 0-6

==== Connacht Final ====
10 July 2016
2.00 PM
Final

| Galway | 1-9 - 0-6 | Mayo |
|---|---|---|
| | Report |

=== Leinster Minor Football Championship ===
==== Leinster Format ====
All twelve Leinster teams compete in the preliminary round of the main draw. The six beaten teams enter the losers' section and, after four play-off matches, two teams re-enter the main draw at the quarter-final stage. From the quarter-finals onwards all matches are knock-out.

==== Leinster Main Draw ====
Preliminary Round
Westmeath | 3-9
Longford | 0-12
Kildare | 2-16
Wicklow | 0-7
Dublin | 2-14
Offaly | 1-7
Meath | 0-11
Laois | 1-6
Kilkenny | 0-1
Wexford | 17-20
Carlow | 1-8
Louth | 1-14

Quarter-Finals
Kildare | 1-16
Westmeath | 0-8
Dublin | 2-5
Meath | 1-18
Wexford | 1-11
Offaly** | 0-19
Louth | 1-12
Laois** | 2-10

Semi-Finals
Kildare | 0-19
Meath | 0-15
Offaly | 0-6
Laois | 1-15

Leinster Final
Kildare | 1-18
Laois | 0-10

==== Leinster Losers' Rounds 1 and 2 ====
The six beaten teams in the preliminary round of the main draw play-off in four matches. Two teams from the losers' section re-enter the main draw at the quarter-final stage.

Losers Round 1
Longford | 0-12
Offaly | 1-11
Wicklow | w/o
Kilkenny | scr

Losers Round 2
Offaly | 1-13
Wicklow | 2-9
Carlow | 1-4
Laois | 1-13

Leinster Quarter Finalists**
Quarter Finalist in Main Draw | n/a
Quarter Finalist in Main Draw | n/a

==== Leinster Final ====
17 July 2016
12.30 pm
Final

| Laois | 0-10 - 1-18 | Kildare |
|---|---|---|
| | Report |

Croke Park, Dublin

=== Munster Minor Football Championship ===
==== Munster Format ====
All six Munster teams compete in the three quarter-finals of the main draw. The three beaten teams enter the play-off section and, after two play-off matches, one team re-enters the main draw at the semi-final stage. From the semi-finals onwards all matches are knock-out.

==== Munster Main Draw ====
Quarter-Finals
Kerry | 2-21
Waterford | 1-2
Clare | 0-9
Limerick | 1-5
Tipperary | 1-11
Cork | 1-14

Semi-Finals
Kerry | 1-13
Clare | 1-6
Cork | 1-19
Limerick | 0-6

Munster Final
Kerry | 3-14
Cork | 3-8

==== Munster Playoff Rounds 1 and 2 ====
The three beaten teams in the quarter-finals of the main draw play-off in two matches. One team from the play-offs re-enters the main draw at the semi-final stage.

| Playoff 1 | | Playoff 2 |
| Limerick | 3-8 |
| Tipperary | 0-11 | Limerick | 1-13 |
| | | Waterford | 1-5 |

==== Munster Final ====
3 July 2016
12.00 noon
Final

| Kerry | 3-14 - 3-8 | Cork |
|---|---|---|
| | Report |

=== Ulster Minor Football Championship ===
==== Ulster Format ====
All nine Ulster teams compete. The fixtures mirror the senior fixtures i.e. if Derry are drawn to play Tyrone in their first match in the senior championship then Derry minors play Tyrone minors in their first match. Often the minor teams play immediately before the seniors. All matches are knock-out.

The winners receive the Fr. Murray Cup.

==== Ulster Main Draw ====
Preliminary Round
Fermanagh | 2-9
Antrim | 4-10

Quarter-Finals
Derry | 1-15
Tyrone | 0-10
Cavan | 1-12
Armagh | 2-14
Monaghan | 1-13
Down | 0-11
Donegal | 2-11
Antrim | 2-7

Semi-Finals
Derry | 1-17 aet
Armagh | 0-14 aet
Monaghan | 2-12
Donegal | 3-15

Ulster Final
Derry | 1-11
Donegal | 2-10

==== Ulster Final ====
17 July 2016
12.00 noon
Final

| Derry | 1-11 - 2-10 | Donegal |
|---|---|---|
| | Report |

St. Tiernach's Park, Clones

== All-Ireland ==
=== All-Ireland Main Draw ===
Quarter-finals
30 July 2016 – O'Connor Park
Galway | 3-10
Laois | 0-12
30 July 2016– Croke Park
Donegal | 2-13
Cork | 0-13
31 July 2016– Croke Park
Kerry | 1-24
Derry | 2-10
1 August 2016 – O'Connor Park
Kildare | 2-14
Mayo | 2-08

Semi-finals
21 August 2016 – Croke Park
Galway | 2-12
Donegal | 1-11
28 August 2016 – Croke Park
Kerry | 2-26
Kildare | 0-10

Final
18 September 2016– Croke Park
Galway | 0-9
Kerry | 3-7

=== All-Ireland Quarter-Finals ===
The four provincial champions play the four beaten finalists from the provincial championships.

30 July
Quarter-Final

| Galway | 3-10 - 0-12 | Laois |
|---|---|---|
| | Report |

O'Connor Park, Tullamore
Referee: James Bermingham (Cork)

30 July
Quarter-Final

| Donegal | 2-13 - 0-13 | Cork |
|---|---|---|
| | Report |

Croke Park, Dublin
Referee: Jerome Henry (Mayo)

31 July
Quarter-Final

| Kerry | 1-24 - 2-10 | Derry |
|---|---|---|
| | Report |

Croke Park, Dublin
Referee: John Hickey (Carlow)

01 August
Quarter-Final

| Kildare | 2-14 - 2-8 | Mayo |
|---|---|---|
| | Report |

O'Connor Park, Tullamore
Referee: Niall Cullen (Fermanagh)

=== All-Ireland Semi-Finals ===
There is no draw for the semi-finals as the fixtures are pre-determined on a three yearly rotation. This rotation ensures that a provinces's champions play the champions of all the other provinces once every three years in the semi-finals if they each win their quarter-finals. If a provincial winner loses their quarter final, then the provincial runner-up who beat them takes their place in the semi-final.

21 August
1:30 pm
Semi-Final

| Galway | 2-12 - 1-11 | Donegal |
|---|---|---|
| | Report |

Croke Park, Dublin
Referee: John Hickey (Carlow)

28 August
1:30 pm
Semi-Final

| Kerry | 2-26 - 0-10 | Kildare |
|---|---|---|
| | Report |

Croke Park, Dublin
Referee: Martin McNally (Monaghan)

=== All-Ireland final ===
18 September
1:15 pm
Final

| Kerry | 3-7 - 0-9 | Galway |
|---|---|---|
| | Report |

Croke Park, Dublin
Referee: Ciaran Branagan (Down)

== See also ==
- 2016 All-Ireland Senior Football Championship
- 2016 All-Ireland Under-21 Football Championship
