= 2018 All-Ireland Minor Football Championship =

Gaelic football competition

All-Ireland Minor Football Championship 2018
Championship details
- Dates: April – 2 September 2018
- Teams: 31

All-Ireland Champions
- Winning team: Kerry (16th win)

All-Ireland Finalists
- Losing team: Galway

Provincial Champions
- Munster: Kerry
- Leinster: Meath
- Ulster: Monaghan
- Connacht: Galway

Championship statistics
- Player of the Year: Paul Walsh (Kerry)

The 2018 All-Ireland Minor Football Championship was the GAA's premier inter-county gaelic football competition for under 17s. Thirty-one county teams from Ireland competed (Kilkenny did not participate).

2018 was the first minor competition for under 17 year-olds – previously the competition had an under 18 age limit. The under 17 championship with a new format was introduced after a vote at the GAA congress on 26 February 2016.

A league format was introduced in Connacht and Leinster. Munster retained their double elimination format and Ulster changed to a double elimination format.

Kerry defeated Galway by 0-21 to 1-14 on 2 September 2018 to win their fifth All-Ireland minor title in a row, the first time this feat was achieved.

The winners received the Tom Markham Cup.

== Teams ==
Thirty-one teams from Ireland contested the championship as Kilkenny withdrew after competing in 2016. New York and London did not participate in this competition.

== Competition format ==
Provincial Championships

Connacht, Leinster, Munster and Ulster each organised provincial championships. Each province decided their own rules for determining their champions. The formats for the 2018 provincial championships are explained in the sections below.

All-Ireland

The four provincial winners play the four provincial runners-up in the All-Ireland quarter-finals. Two semi-finals and a final follow. All matches are played in a single knockout format. The minor final is normally played before the All-Ireland senior final.

== Provincial championships ==
=== Connacht Minor Football Championship ===
==== Connacht Format ====
All five Connacht counties compete in a single round-robin format. The top 2 teams in the round robin table meet again in the Connacht final.

The winners receive the Tom Kilcoyne Cup.

==== Connacht Table ====
Pos	Team	Pld	W	D	L	PF	PA	PD	Pts	Qualification
1	Galway	4	4	0	0	98	44	+54	8	Contest Connacht final and advance to All-Ireland quarter finals
2	Roscommon	4	3	0	1	93	66	+27	6	Contest Connacht final and advance to All-Ireland quarter finals
3	Mayo	4	2	0	2	79	60	+19	4	
4	Leitrim	4	1	0	3	54	101	−47	2	
5	Sligo	4	0	0	4	49	101	−52	0	

Updated to match(es) played on unknown. Source:
Rules for classification: 1) League points; 2) Where only two teams are involved, the outcome of the meeting of the two teams in the competition; 3) Scoring difference; 4) Highest total score for; 5) A play-off.

==== Connacht League Section Rounds 1 to 5 ====
2 May 2018 Round 1	Mayo	4-20 - 1-9	Leitrim	MacHale Park
		Report		Referee: P Daly Roscommon

4 May 2018 Round 1	Galway	4-18 - 0-8	Roscommon	Tuam Stadium, Galway
	M Cooley (2) A Halloran (2)	Report		Referee: B Judge Sligo

11 May 2018 Round 2	Sligo	0-10 - 3-15	Galway	Markievicz Park Sligo
				Referee: Declan Corcoran Mayo

11 May 2018 Round 2	Roscommon	4-12 - 0-11	Mayo	Kiltoom Roscommon

23 June 2018 Round 3	Leitrim	0-9 - 4-15	Roscommon	Páirc Seán Mac Diarmada
				Referee: Ronan Hynes Sligo

23 June 2018 Round 3	Mayo	2-18 - 0-10	Sligo	MacHale Park
				Referee: Marty Parker Roscommon

29 June 2018 Round 4	Galway	0-15 - 1-9	Mayo	Tuam Stadium, Galway
		Report		Referee: Brendan Healy Roscommon

29 June 2018 Round 4	Sligo	0-13 - 2-14	Leitrim	Markievicz Park Sligo
				Referee: Paul Lydon Mayo

6 July 2018 Round 5	Leitrim	1-11-4-17	Galway	Páirc Seán Mac Diarmada
				Referee: Patrick Mc Tiernan Roscommon

6 July 2018 Round 5	Roscommon	5-18-1-13	Sligo	MacHale Park
				Referee: Martin Flaherty Galway

==== Connacht Final ====
13 July 2018
19:30 IST (UTC+1)
Final

Match Report

Roscommon	2-9 (15) – (19) 2-13	Galway

Dr Hyde Park, Roscommon
Referee: John Gilmartin Sligo

=== Leinster Minor Football Championship ===
==== Leinster Format ====
Leinster teams competed in two groups, one of six teams and one of five teams. Each team in a group plays a single match against the other teams. The first two teams in each group progress to the Leinster semi-finals.

==== Leinster Group 1 Table ====
Pos	Team	Pld	W	D	L	PF	PA	PD	Pts	Qualification
1	Meath	3	3	0	0	68	39	+29	6	Advance to Leinster Semi-Final
2	Dublin	3	2	0	1	55	36	+19	4	Advance to Leinster Semi-Final
3	Offaly	3	2	0	1	41	43	−2	4	
4	Wicklow	3	1	1	1	67	53	+14	3	
5	Louth	3	0	1	2	49	77	−28	1	
6	Westmeath	3	0	0	3	35	67	−32	0	

First match(es) will be played: February 2019. Source:
Rules for classification: 1) League points; 2) Where only two teams are involved, the outcome of the meeting of the two teams in the competition; 3) Scoring difference; 4) Highest total score for; 5) A play-off.

==== Leinster Group 1 Rounds 1 to 5 ====
April 2018 Round 1	v

April 2018 Round 1	v

April 2018 Round 1	v

April 2018 Round 2	v

April 2018 Round 2	v

April 2018 Round 2	v

April 2018 Round 3	v

April 2018 Round 3	v

April 2018 Round 3	v

June 2018 Round 4	v

June 2018 Round 4	v

June 2018 Round 4	v

June 2018 Round 5	v

June 2018 Round 5	v

June 2018 Round 5	v

==== Leinster Group 2 Table ====
Pos	Team	Pld	W	D	L	SF	SA	Diff	Pts
1	Wexford	1	1	0	0	1-0	1-0	1	2
2	Kildare	1	1	0	0	1-0	1-0	1	2
3	Carlow	1	1	0	0	1-0	1-0	1	2
4	Laois	1	1	0	0	1-0	1-0	1	2
5	Longford	1	1	0	0	1-0	1-0	1	2

==== Leinster Group 2 Rounds 1 to 5 ====
April 2018 Round 1	v

April 2018 Round 1	v

April 2018 Round 2	v

April 2018 Round 2	v

April 2018 Round 3	v

April 2018 Round 3	v

June 2018 Round 4	v

June 2018 Round 4	v

June 2018 Round 5	v

June 2018 Round 5	v

==== Leinster Semi-Finals ====
7 July 2018 Semi-Final 1	Laois	v	Meath

Semi-Final 2	v

==== Leinster Final ====
21 July 2018
2:00 pm
Final

Meath	v	Kildare

=== Munster Minor Football Championship ===
==== Munster Format ====
All six Munster teams competed in the three quarter-finals of the main draw. The three beaten teams entered the play-off section and, after two play-off matches, one team re-entered the main draw at the semi-final stage. From the semi-finals all matches were knockout.

==== Munster Main Draw ====
Quarter-Finals		Semi-Finals		Munster Final
Kerry	1-15
Tipperary	0-4	Kerry	1-11
Cork	4-20	Cork	1-10
Waterford	0-5			Kerry
				Clare
		Clare	1-9
Clare	3-13	Tipperary	2-4
Limerick	1-9

==== Munster Playoff Draw ====
The three teams who were beaten in the quarter-finals of the main draw competed in a play-off in two matches. The winning team from the play-offs re-entered the main draw at the semi-final stage.

Playoff 1		Playoff 2
Tipperary	2-12
Limerick	1-11	Tipperary	2-11
		Waterford	2-6

==== Munster Quarter-Finals ====
Quarter-Final A	v

Quarter-Final B	v

Quarter-Final C	v

==== Munster Playoff Rounds 1 and 2 ====
Playoff 1	v

Playoff 2	v

==== Munster Semi-Finals ====
Semi-Final 1	v

Semi-Final 2	v

==== Munster Final ====
Final	v

=== Ulster Minor Football Championship ===
==== Ulster Format ====
In 2018 the Ulster Championship changed to a double-elimination format, which replaced the straight knockout style of previous years. Every team who lost a match before the semi-finals re-entered the competition via the Qualifiers Round 1 (R1), Qualifiers Round 2 (R2) or Qualifiers Round 3 (R3). This ensured that all teams played at least two games. The semi-finals and final were knockout.

The winners received the Father Murray Cup.

==== Ulster Direct Route ====
===== Ulster Preliminary Round =====
Two of the nine teams were drawn to play in the preliminary round.

21 April 2018 Prelim. Round	Derry	2-14 (20) – (19) 2-13	Monaghan	Derry
18:00 IST (UTC+1)				Venue: Celtic Park
				Referee: Karol Doherty

===== Ulster Round 1 =====
The seven teams who avoided the preliminary round plus the winners of the preliminary round competed in four matches in round 1.

28 April 2018 Round 1	Antrim	0-08 (08) – (14) 2-08	Fermanagh	Belfast
18:00 IST (UTC+1)				Venue: Corrigan Park
				Referee: Martin Conroy

28 April 2018 Round 1	Donegal	1-10 (13) – (27) 5-12	Tyrone	Ballybofey
18:00 IST (UTC+1)				Venue: MacCumhaill Park
				Referee: Kevin Faloon

28 April 2018 Round 1	Down	0-11 (11) – (08) 0-08	Armagh	Newry
18:00 IST (UTC+1)				Venue: Páirc Esler
				Referee: Pat Clarke

28 April 2018 Round 1	Cavan	0-18 (18) – (17) 1-14	Derry	Kingscourt
18:00 IST (UTC+1)
				Referee: Stephen Campbell

===== Ulster Round 2 =====
The four winning teams from round 1 met in two matches.

12 May 2018 Round 2	Fermanagh	1-07 (10) – (15) 2-09	Cavan	Enniskillen
18:00 IST (UTC+1)				Venue: Brewster Park
				Referee: Mark Dorrian

12 May 2018 Round 2	Down	0-09 (09) – (17) 2-11	Tyrone	Newry
18:00 IST (UTC+1)				Venue: Páirc Esler
				Referee: James Lewis

==== Ulster Qualifier Route ====
===== Ulster Qualifiers R1 =====
Two of the five teams beaten in the preliminary round or round 1 met in a playoff match. The losing team was eliminated from the competition.

5 May 2018 Q Round 1	Antrim	0-07 (07) – (21) 3-12	Monaghan	Belfast
14:00 IST (UTC+1)				Venue: Corrigan Park
				Referee: Ciaran Mooney

===== Ulster Qualifiers R2 =====
The four remaining teams who lost only one match in the preliminary round or round 1 met in two matches with the two losing teams being eliminated,

12 May 2018 Q Round 2	Armagh	1-05 (08) – (23) 3-14	Derry	Armagh
18:00 IST (UTC+1)				Venue: Athletic Grounds
				Referee: Darren O'Hare

13 May 2018 Q Round 2	Donegal	1-10 (13) – (15) 1-12	Monaghan	Ballybofey
14:00 IST (UTC+1)				Venue: MacCumhaill Park
				Referee: Conor Dourneen

===== Ulster Qualifiers R3 =====
The two losing teams from round 2 (who lost only one match) met the two winning teams from the qualifiers R2. The two losing teams were eliminated from the competition.

20 May 2018 Q Round 3	Fermanagh	0-05 (05) – (17) 2-11	Derry	Armagh
12:00 IST (UTC+1)				Venue: Athletic Grounds
				Referee: Karol Doherty

20 May 2018 Q Round 3	Down	1-16 (19) – (23) 1-20	Monaghan	Omagh
14:00 IST (UTC+1)				Venue: Healy Park
				Referee: Kieran Eannetta

==== Ulster Knockout Stage ====
===== Ulster Semi-Finals =====
The two winning teams from round 2 met the two winning teams from the qualifiers R3. The two losing teams were eliminated from the competition.

1 July 2018
5:15 pm
Semi-Final

Report

Cavan	2-04 (10) – (22) 2-16	Monaghan

Athletic Grounds, Armagh
Referee: Darren O'Hare

1 July 2018
7:00 pm
Semi-Final

Derry	2-10 (16) – (11) 1-08	Tyrone

Athletic Grounds, Armagh
Referee: Kevin Faloon (Armagh)

===== Ulster Final =====
13 July 2018
8:00 pm
Final

Report

Derry	0-09 (09) – (12) 1-09	Monaghan
(HT: 0-06 – 0-05)
Pts: Enda Downey (5, 4f), Conleth McGuckin (2, 2f), Eoghan Hawe, Ethan Doherty		Gls: Donnach Swinburne; Pts: Aaron Mulligan (5, 3f), Sean Jones (3, 2f), Ronan Grimes

Athletic Grounds, Armagh
Referee: Margaret Farrelly (Cavan)

== All-Ireland ==
=== All-Ireland Draw ===
Quarter-Final		Semi-Final		Final
Galway	0-18
Clare	0-11	Galway	3-13
Meath	1-15	Meath	2-09
Derry	1-10			Galway	1-14
Kerry	2-16			Kerry	0-21
Roscommon	2-07	Kerry	1-16
Monaghan	2-11	Monaghan	2-11
Kildare	0-08

=== Quarter-finals ===
The four provincial champions played the four beaten finalists from the provincial championships.

28 July 2018
15:00 IST (UTC+1)
Quarter-Final

Report

Meath	1-15 (18) – (13) 1-10	Derry
(HT: 1-10 – 0-04)
Gls: Luke Mitchell; Pts: Luke Mitchell (6, 5f) Luke Kelly (2), Darragh Swaine (2), David Bell, Bryan McCormack, Adam Reilly, Cian McBride, Mathew Costello		Gls: Conleth McGuckian (pen); Pts: Enda Downey (5, 1f, 1 '45), Conleth McGuckian (4, 3f), Niall Doyle

Athletic Grounds, Armagh
Referee: Liam Devenney (Mayo)

28 July 2018
15:00 IST (UTC+1)
Quarter-Final

Report

Kerry	2-16 (22) – (13) 2-07	Roscommon
(HT: 2-10 – 0-04)
Gls: Ruaidhrí Ó’Beaglaoích, Killian Falvey; Pts: Paul Walsh (5, 2f), Patrick D’Arcy (3), Darragh Rahilly (2), Paul O’Shea (2), Dylan Geaney (2, 1f), Ruaidhrí Ó’Beaglaoích, Michael Lenihan		Gls: Fearghus Lennon, Charlie Carthy; Pts: James Fitzpatrick (3), Adam McDermott (2), Richard Walsh, Fearghus Lennon

Gaelic Grounds, Limerick
Referee: Sean Lonergan (Tipperary)

28 July 2018
15:00 IST (UTC+1)
Quarter-Final

Report

Monaghan	2-11 (17) – (08) 0-08	Kildare
(HT: 1-05 – 0-05)
Gls: Aaron Mulligan, Donnacha Swinburne; Pts: Sean Jones (4, 4f), Aaron Mulligan (3, 2f), Donnacha Swinburne, Loughlinn Power, Shane Hanratty, Karl Gallagher		Pts: Padraig Behan (5, 3f), Eoghan O’Haire (2, 2f), Sam Reilly

Cusack Park, Mullingar
Referee: Paul Faloon (Down)

29 July 2018
13:30 IST (UTC+1)
Quarter-Final

Report

Galway	0-18 (18) – (11) 0-11	Clare
(HT: 0-03 – 0-08)
Pts: Ryan Monaghan (6, 6f), Oisín Gormley (3), Conor Raftery (2) Eoghan Tinney (2), Aidan Halloran, Tony Gill, Daniel Cox, Tomo Culhane, Niall Cunningham		Pts: Shane Meehan (4, 4f), Thomas Guyler (2), Keelan Guyler (2), Joey Droney, Emmet McMahon (f), Tadhg Lillis

O'Connor Park, Tullamore
Referee: Padraig O'Sullivan (Kerry)

=== Semi-finals ===
There was no draw for the semi-finals as the fixtures are pre-determined on a three yearly rotation. This rotation ensures that a provinces's champions play the champions of all the other provinces once every three years in the semi-finals, if they each win their quarter-finals. If a provincial winner loses their quarter final, then the provincial runner-up who beat them take their place in the semi-final.

TG4

11 August 2018
15:00 IST (UTC+1)
Semi-Final 1

Report

Galway	3-13 (22) – (15) 2-09	Meath
(HT: 0-06 – 2-04)
Gls: Tony Gill, Oisin McCormack, Eoghan Tinney; Pts: Aidan Halloran (4), Cathal Sweeney (3), Ryan Monahan (2, 2f), Tomo Culhane, Conor Raftery, Daniel Cox, Paul Kelly		Gls: Luke Mitchell, Luke Kelly; Pts: Luke Mitchell (4, 2f), David Bell (2, 2f), Matthew Costello, Bryan McCormack, Sean Coffey

Croke Park, Dublin
Referee: Noel Mooney (Cavan)

TG4

12 August 2018
13:30 IST (UTC+1)
Semi-Final 2

Report

Kerry	1-16 (19) – (17) 2-11	Monaghan
(HT: 0-10 – 0-06)
Gls: David Mangan; Pts: Dylan Geaney (5, 2f), Darragh Rahilly (3), Paul Walsh (3, 2f), Dan McCarthy (2), Killian Falvey, Darragh Lyne, Jack Kennelly		Gls: Jason Irwin, Mark Mooney; Pts: Aaron Mulligan (4, 1f), Sean Jones (4, 4f), Loughlin Power, Donnacha Swinburne, Jason Irwin

Croke Park, Dublin
Referee: Paddy Neilan (Roscommon)

=== Final ===
TG4

2 September 2018
13:00 IST (UTC+1)
Final

Report

Galway	1-14 (17) – (21) 0-21	Kerry
(HT: 1-09 – 0-08)
Gls: Tony Gill; Pts: Matthew Cooley (5, 4f), Tomo Culhane (2), Conor Raftery (2), Ryan Monaghan, Liam Judge, Eoghan Tinney, Oisin Gormley, Paul Kelly		Pts: Paul Walsh (4, 1f), Killian Falvey (4), Darragh Rahilly (3), Ruaidhrí Ó Beaglaoích (3), Dylan Geaney (2), Paul O’Shea (2, 1f, 1 ’45), Michael Lenihan, Dan McCarthy, Jack O’Connor (f)

Croke Park, Dublin
Referee: Sean Hurson (Tyrone)

== Minor Team Of The Year ==
1. John Ball (Kildare)
2. Ronan Grimes (Monaghan)
3. Owen Fitzgerald (Kerry)
4. Tiarnan Woods (Derry)
5. Colm Moriarty (Kerry)
6. Tony Gill (Galway)
7. Mark Lavin (Dublin)
8. Darragh Rahilly (Kerry)
9. Conor Raftery (Galway)
10. Paul Walsh (Kerry)
11. Matthew Costello (Meath)
12. Aaron Mulligan (Monaghan)
13. Luke Mitchell (Meath)
14. Eoin Darcy (Wicklow)
15. Matthew Cooley (Galway)

== See also ==
- 2018 All-Ireland Senior Football Championship
- 2018 All-Ireland Under-20 Football Championship
