= Tiernan McCann =

Irish Gaelic footballer

Personal information
- Born: 24 May 1991 (age 35) Killyclogher, Northern Ireland
- Occupation: Pharmacist

Sport
- Sport: Gaelic football
- Position: Right half back
Club
- Years: Club
- Killyclogher St Mary's
Inter-county
- Years: County
- 2014–2021: Tyrone
Inter-county titles
- Ulster titles: 3
- All-Irelands: 1

Tiernan McCann (born 24 May 1991) is a Gaelic footballer who plays for the Killyclogher St Mary's club and formerly of the Tyrone county team.

In the 2015 All-Ireland Senior Football Championship victory over Monaghan on 8 August at Croke Park, McCann was heavily criticized after he threw himself to the ground when Monaghan's Darren Hughes stroked the top of his head, with Hughes then sent off for the action. McCann was given an eight-week ban for his behaviour; the ban was then lifted at a meeting of the Central Hearings Committee on 19 August.

His father Terry McCann is a club manager, including of Réalt na Mara in 2020, while his brother Conall also plays for Tyrone.
