= Connor McAliskey =

Tyrone Gaelic footballer

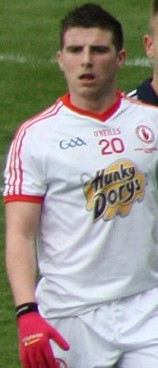
- McAliskey during the 2013 National Football League final against Dublin at Croke Park

Sport
- Sport: Gaelic football
- Position: Centre forward
Club
- Years: Club
- Clonoe
Inter-county
- Years: County
- 2013–2019: Tyrone
Inter-county titles
- Ulster titles: 2

Connor McAliskey is a Gaelic footballer who plays for the Clonoe club and formerly of the Tyrone county team.

McAliskey started at corner-forward for Tyrone in the 2018 All-Ireland Final defeat to Dublin.

In November 2019, he left the squad ahead of the 2020 season to take a year out, with the intention of returning in 2021.
