= 2018 All-Ireland Senior Football Championship =

Championship details
- Dates: 6 May – 2 September 2018
- Teams: 33

All-Ireland Champions
- Winning team: Dublin (28th win)
- Captain: Stephen Cluxton
- Manager: Jim Gavin

All-Ireland Finalists
- Losing team: Tyrone
- Captain: Mattie Donnelly
- Manager: Mickey Harte

Provincial Champions
- Munster: Kerry
- Leinster: Dublin
- Ulster: Donegal
- Connacht: Galway

Championship statistics
- Top Scorer: Conor McManus (2–47)
- Player of the Year: Brian Fenton

The 2018 All-Ireland Senior Football Championship was the 132nd edition of the GAA's premier inter-county Gaelic football competition since its establishment in 1887.

Thirty-three teams entered the competition – thirty-one of the thirty-two counties of Ireland (Kilkenny, as in previous years, did not enter), London and New York.

== Format ==
Provincial Championships format

Connacht, Leinster, Munster and Ulster each organise a provincial championship. All provincial matches are knock-out but the teams who lose a match (with the exception of New York) enter the All-Ireland qualifiers.

Qualifiers format

Twenty-eight of the twenty-nine teams who were beaten in the provincial championships enter the All-Ireland qualifiers, which have a single-game knockout format. Sixteen of the seventeen teams (New York do not enter the qualifiers) who lost in provincial first round or quarter-final games play eight matches in round 1. The winners play the eight losing provincial semi-finalists in round 2. The eight winning teams from round 2 play-off against each other in round 3, with the four winning teams facing the four losing provincial finalists in round 4 to complete the double-elimination format. Further details of the format are included with each qualifier round listed below.

All-Ireland format

Significant changes to the format of the All-Ireland championship were passed at the GAA's Annual Congress in February 2017 and implemented in the 2018 championship. The major change was the creation of the All-Ireland Quarter-Final Group Stage commonly known as the "Super 8s", which replaced the knockout quarter-finals. The eight remaining teams in the Championship are split into two groups of four teams. One group features the Connacht champions, Munster champions, Leinster runners-up (or the team that defeats them in the qualifiers) and Ulster runners-up (or the team that defeats them in the qualifiers). The reverse is employed for the other group, which features the Leinster champions, Ulster champions, Connacht runners-up (or the team that defeats them in the qualifiers) and Munster runners-up (or team that defeats them in the qualifiers).

The top two teams in each of the two Super 8 groups advance to the semi-finals, with the winners of those matches meeting in the All-Ireland Senior Football Championship Final. The All-Ireland final was initially scheduled for 26 August 2018 but was moved to 2 September 2018 to avoid clashing with Pope Francis's visit to Ireland.

A number of former players have publicly criticised the new format as they believed it would result in the same top county teams regularly playing at least three high-profile matches in July and August while the remaining teams are without competitive football until the end of December, thereby enabling the top teams to become even more elite. Prominent sportswriter and RTÉ Sport analyst Joe Brolly referred to the new system as the "Super 8/Crap 25". The changes were to be trialled for three years before being reviewed by the GAA in late 2020.

== Changes from 2017 Championship ==
=== Rules ===
- From 1 January 2018 the kickout must travel beyond the 20 metre line. Previously the players had to be outside the 20 metre line before the kickout was taken but could run inside to collect possession. If the rule is broken by the team taking the kickout the referee throws the ball up on the 20 metre line between a member of each team.
- Replays to only be held for drawn provincial finals and All-Ireland finals. The game continues until a winner is determined in all other championship matches except the Super 8 group matches. Initially two periods of ten minutes each way are played. If the score is still level two further periods of five minutes each way are played. If the score is still level, a free-taking competition is held until a winner is determined.
- The A and B split system for the qualifier draws introduced in 2014 was discontinued.

=== Referees' interpretation ===
- Players who enter a situation involving two players and cause a melee to receive red cards. Willie Barret, Referees Development Chairman, said "We would be particularly honing in on the first and second person into the melee after the initial two players have been involved."

== Provincial championships ==
=== Connacht Championship ===
Quarter-finals
New York	1-15
Leitrim (a.e.t.)	0-19
London	1-11
Sligo	1-21
Mayo	0-12
Galway	1-12

Semi-finals
Leitrim	0-10
Roscommon	0-24
Sligo	1-12
Galway	4-24

Final
Roscommon	2-06
Galway	0-16

RTÉ

17 June 2018
4:00 pm
Connacht Final

Report

Roscommon	2–06 (12) – 0–16 (16)	Galway
(HT: 1–5 – 0–5)
Gls: C Murtagh 1, C Devaney 1 (1 pen); Pts: D Murtagh 5 (2f), D Smith 1		Pts: S Walsh 8 (5f), I Burke 3, D Comer 2, S Kelly 1, S Armstrong 1, A Varley 1

Dr Hyde Park, Roscommon
Referee: David Coldrick (Meath)
Attendance: 18,864

=== Leinster Championship ===
The four winning teams in the previous year's quarter-finals were given byes to this year's quarter-finals. Six of the seven remaining teams played off in the first round with the seventh team receiving a bye to the quarter-finals.

First round
Laois (a.e.t.)	2-21
Wexford	1-18
Louth	0-12
Carlow	2-17
Offaly	1-15
Wicklow (a.e.t.)	1-20

Quarter-finals
Westmeath	1-12
Laois	4-13
Kildare	1-10
Carlow	2-14
Dublin	4-25
Wicklow	1-11
Meath	0-14
Longford	0-16

Semi-finals
Laois	0-12
Carlow	0-8
Dublin	2-25
Longford	0-12

Final
Laois	0-10
Dublin	1-25

RTÉ

24 June 2018
4:00 pm
Leinster Final

Report

Dublin	1–25 (28) – (10) 0–10	Laois
(HT: 1-08 – 0-05)
Gls: C. Kilkenny 1 Pts: Dean Rock 8 (5f, 1 '45), C Kilkenny 4, C Costello 4, B Fenton 2, C O'Callaghan 2, P Andrews 2, B Howard 1, N Scully 1, P Mannion 1		Pts: D Kingston 0–4 (0-3f), A Farrell 2, G Walsh 2, K Lillis 1, E O'Carroll 1

Croke Park, Dublin
Referee: Barry Cassidy (Derry)
Attendance: 41,728

=== Munster Championship ===
The two winning teams in the previous year's semi-finals were given byes to this year's semi-finals.

Quarter-finals
Tipperary	0-20
Waterford	0-9
Limerick	0-14
Clare	1-22

Semi-finals
Tipperary	0-9
Cork	1-17
Kerry	0-32
Clare	0-10

Final
Cork	2-4
Kerry	3-18

RTÉ

23 June 2018
7:00 pm
Munster Final

Report

Cork	2–4 (10) – (27) 3–18	Kerry
(HT: 2-01 – 1–11)
Gls: M Collins 1, L Connolly 1 Pts: L Connolly 2 (1f), M Collins 1, P Kelleher 1		Gls: P Geaney 2, S O'Brien 1 Pts: P Geaney 5, S O'Shea 4 (2 45, 1f), J O'Donoghue 3 (1f), D Clifford 2, P Murphy 2, G White 1, BJ Keane 1

Páirc Uí Chaoimh, Cork
Referee: Ciarán Branagan (Down)
Attendance: 27,764

=== Ulster Championship ===
All nine teams were drawn randomly without conditions to determine the fixtures.

Preliminary round
Donegal	2-20
Cavan	1-15

Quarter-finals
Fermanagh	0-12
Armagh	0-7
Tyrone	1-16
Monaghan	1-18
Down	1-18
Antrim	0-14
Derry	0-16
Donegal	2-16

Semi-finals
Fermanagh	1-8
Monaghan	0-10
Down	1-12
Donegal	2-22

Final
Fermanagh	0-12
Donegal	2-18

RTÉ
BBC

24 June 2018
2:00pm
Ulster Final

Report

Fermanagh	0–12 (12) – (24) 2–18	Donegal
(HT: 0-05 – 2-07)
Pts: Sean Quigley 5 (5f), Seamus Quigley 3 (1f), B Mulrone 1, E Donnelly 1, C Jones 1, C Corrigan 1		Gls: EB Gallagher 1, R McHugh 1 Pts: M Murphy 4 (3f), C Thompson 3 (1f), P Brennan 2, P McGrath 1, EB Gallagher 1, O MacNiallais 1, M Langan 1, P McBrearty 1, J Brennan 1, M McHugh 1, D O'Connor 1

St. Tiernach's Park, Clones
Referee: David Gough (Meath)
Attendance: 28,150

== All-Ireland Series ==
=== Qualifiers ===
==== Format ====
The A and B split system for the qualifier draws introduced in 2014 was discontinued after 2017. In qualifier rounds one to three, teams from divisions three and four of the 2018 National Football League had home advantage if drawn against teams from divisions one or two. All qualifier matches were knockout.

Initial schedule

Qualifiers Round 1: 9 June 2018
Qualifiers Round 2: 23 June 2018
Qualifiers Round 3: 30 June 2018
Qualifiers Round 4: 7 & 8 July 2018

==== Round 1 ====
In the first round, sixteen of the seventeen teams who were beaten in the preliminary rounds or quarter-finals of the provincial championships competed. New York did not enter the qualifiers. The round 1 draw was unrestricted − if two teams had previously met in a provincial match they could be drawn to meet again. The eight winners of these matches played the eight losing provincial semi-finalists in round 2 of the qualifiers. The draw was conducted on 28 May 2018.

The following teams took part in round 1:

Connacht (2)

- London
- Mayo

Leinster (7)

- Kildare
- Louth
- Meath
- Offaly
- Westmeath
- Wexford
- Wicklow

Munster (2)

- Limerick
- Waterford

Ulster (5)

- Antrim
- Armagh
- Cavan
- Derry
- Tyrone

9 June 2018 Round 1	Wexford	1–18 (21) – (23) 3–14	Waterford	Wexford
13:30 IST (UTC+1)				Venue: Wexford Park
	Gls: Naomhan Rossiter; Pts: Donal Shanley (9, 6f), John Tubritt (4), Ben Brosnan (3), Eoghan Nolan, Brian Malone	Report	Gls: JJ Hutchinson, Shane Ryan, Joe Allen; Pts: Jason Curry (6, 5f), JJ Hutchinson (2), Conor Murray (3), Kieran Power (2), Tommy Prendergast	Referee: Cormac Reilly (Meath)

9 June 2018 Round 1	Derry	2–14 (20) – (28) 2–22	Kildare	Dungiven
15:00 IST (UTC+1)				Venue: Owenbeg Centre of Excellence
	Gls: D Flynn 1, N Kelly 1 Pts: N Flynn 6 (2f), F Conway 4, K Feely 2 (2f) P Cribbin 2, T Moolick 2, M Donnellan 1 (1'45); J Murray 1, K Cribbin 1, D Slattery 1, D Flynn 1, J Byrne 1	Report	Gls: E Lynn 2 Pts: E Bradley 3 (3f), E Lynn 3, M Lynch 2 (2f), J Doherty 2, SL McGoldrick 1, P Cassidy 1, S McGuigan 1	Referee: David Coldrick (Meath)

9 June 2018 Round 1	Meath	0–19 (19) – (20) 2–14 (a.e.t.)	Tyrone	Navan
17:00 IST (UTC+1)		(HT: 0-07 – 1-06) (FT: 0–14 – 1–11)		Venue: Páirc Tailteann
		Report		Referee: Paddy Neilan (Roscommon); TV: Sky Sports

9 June 2018 Round 1	Wicklow	1–05 (08) – (22) 2–16	Cavan	Aughrim
18:00 IST (UTC+1)				Venue: Aughrim County Ground
		Report		Referee: Jerome Henry (Mayo)

9 June 2018 Round 1	Offaly	2–20 (26) – (18) 1–15	Antrim	Tullamore
18:00 IST (UTC+1)				Venue: O'Connor Park
		Report		Referee: Martin McNally (Monaghan)

9 June 2018 Round 1	Limerick	3–07 (16) – (34) 5–19	Mayo	Limerick
18:00 IST (UTC+1)				Venue: Gaelic Grounds
		Report		Referee: Niall Cullen (Fermanagh)

9 June 2018 Round 1	Westmeath	1–11 (14) – (25) 3–16	Armagh	Mullingar
19:00 IST (UTC+1)				Venue: TEG Cusack Park
	Gls: Ronan O'Toole; Pts: Ronan O'Toole (2), Luke Loughlin (3, 3f), Denis Corroon (2, 1f), Finbar Coyne, Boidu Sayeh, Kieran Martin and Ger Egan (f)	Report	Gls: Anthony Duffy, Gavin McParland, Kevin Fagan (o.g.); Pts: Rory Grugan (5, 5f), Anthony Duffy, Charlie Vernon (3), Ethan Rafferty (2), Jemar Hall (2), Gregory McCabe, Ryan McShane, Andrew Murnin	Referee: David Gough (Meath)

10 June 2018 Round 1	London	1–19 (22) – (32) 2–26	Louth	Ruislip
14:00 BST (UTC+1)				Venue: McGovern Park
	Gls: Ryan Elliot; Pts: Adrian Moyles (10, 6f), Fearghal McMahon (3), Liam Gavaghan (2, 1f), Mark Gottsche (f), Ryan Elliot, Killian Butler, Liam Irwin	Report	Gls: Ronan Holcroft, Conor Grimes; Pts: William Woods (13, 11f, 1pen), Ciaran Downey (3), Declan Byrne (3), Gerard McSorley (3), Ronan Holcroft, Conor Grimes, Tommy Durnin, Andy McDonnell	Referee: Pádraig Hughes (Armagh)

==== Round 2 ====
In the second round, the eight losing provincial semi-finalists played the eight winning teams from round 1 of the qualifiers. The round 2 draw was unrestricted − if two teams have previously met in a provincial match they could be drawn to meet again. The eight winners of these matches played each other in round 3. The draw was conducted on 11 June 2018.

The following teams took part in round 2 –

Losing Provincial Semi-Finalists (8)

- Carlow
- Clare
- Down
- Leitrim
- Longford
- Monaghan
- Sligo
- Tipperary

Round 1 Winners (8)

- Armagh
- Cavan
- Kildare
- Louth
- Mayo
- Offaly
- Tyrone
- Waterford

23 June 2018 Round 2	Waterford	0–09 (9) – (36) 5–21	Monaghan	Dungarvan
14:00 IST (UTC+1)				Venue: Fraher Field
		Report		Referee: Derek O'Mahoney (Tipperary)

23 June 2018 Round 2	Carlow	1–10 (13) – (23) 3–14	Tyrone	Carlow
17:00 IST (UTC+1)				Venue: Dr Cullen Park
		Report		Referee: Conor Lane (Cork)

23 June 2018 Round 2	Cavan	1–14 (17) – (15) 0–15	Down	Enniskillen
17:00 IST (UTC+1)				Venue: Brewster Park
		Report		Referee: Cormac Reilly (Meath)

23 June 2018 Round 2	Tipperary	1–11 (14) – (22) 1–19	Mayo	Thurles
17:00 IST (UTC+1)				Venue: Semple Stadium
		Report		Referee: Maurice Deegan (Laois); TV: Sky Sports

23 June 2018 Round 2	Sligo	1–13 (16) – (22) 1–19	Armagh	Sligo
18:00 IST (UTC+1)				Venue: Markievicz Park
		Report		Referee: Sean Hurson (Tyrone)

23 June 2018 Round 2	Leitrim	0–25 (25) – (15) 1–12	Louth	Carrick-on-Shannon
19:00 IST (UTC+1)				Venue: Páirc Seán Mac Diarmada
		Report		Referee: Noel Mooney (Cavan)

23 June 2018 Round 2	Longford	1–13 (16) – (19) 1–16	Kildare	Longford
19:00 IST (UTC+1)				Venue: Pearse Park
		Report		Referee: Joe McQuillan (Cavan)

24 June 2018 Round 2	Offaly	2–14 (20) – (22) 1–19	Clare	Tullamore
13:30 IST (UTC+1)				Venue: O'Connor Park
		Report		Referee: Paddy Neilan (Roscommon)

==== Round 3 ====
In the third round, the eight winning teams from round 2 played off in four matches. Round 3 draw rules did not allow two teams that had played each other in a provincial match to meet again if such a pairing could be avoided. The four winners of these matches played the four losing provincial finalists in round 4. The draw was conducted on 25 June 2018.

The following teams took part in round 3 –

Round 2 Winners (8)

- Armagh
- Cavan
- Kildare
- Leitrim
- Mayo
- Monaghan
- Tyrone
- Clare

30 June 2018 Round 3	Leitrim	0–09 (9) – (22) 1–19	Monaghan	Carrick-on-Shannon
14:30 IST (UTC+1)				Venue: Páirc Seán Mac Diarmada
		Report		Referee: Niall Cullen (Fermanagh); Attendance: 8,238

30 June 2018 Round 3	Armagh	2–16 (22) – (18) 1–15	Clare	Armagh
15:00 IST (UTC+1)				Venue: Athletic Grounds
		Report		Referee: Fergal Kelly (Longford)

30 June 2018 Round 3	Cavan	1–12 (15) – (18) 0–18	Tyrone	Enniskillen
17:00 IST (UTC+1)				Venue: Brewster Park
		Report		Referee: David Coldrick (Meath); TV: Sky Sports

30 June 2018 Round 3	Kildare	0–21 (21) – (19) 0–19	Mayo	Newbridge
19:00 IST (UTC+1)				Venue: St Conleth's Park
		Report		Referee: David Gough (Meath); TV: Sky Sports

- Initially the Central Competitions Control Committee scheduled the Cavan vs. Tyrone and Kildare vs. Mayo matches in Croke Park. The venues were changed after Kildare refused to play anywhere other than their home ground, St Conleth's Park, in Newbridge.

==== Round 4 ====
In the fourth round, the four losing provincial finalists played the four winning teams from round 3 of the qualifiers. Round 4 draw rules did not allow teams that have met in a provincial match to meet again if such a pairing could be avoided, which meant Fermanagh were kept apart from Armagh and Monaghan, who they had met in the quarter-finals and semi-finals of the Ulster Championship respectively. The matches are normally held in neutral venues. The four winners of these matches qualified for the All-Ireland Quarter-Final Group Stage. The draw was conducted on 2 July 2018.

The following teams took part in round 4 –

Losing Provincial Finalists (4)

- Cork
- Fermanagh
- Laois
- Roscommon

Round 3 Winners (4)

- Armagh
- Kildare
- Monaghan
- Tyrone

7 July 2018 Round 4	Roscommon	2–22 (28) – (22) 1–19	Armagh	Portlaoise
15:00 IST (UTC+1)				Venue: O'Moore Park
		Report		Referee: Joe McQuillan (Cavan); TV: RTÉ News Now

7 July 2018 Round 4	Cork	0–13 (13) – (29) 3–20	Tyrone	Portlaoise
17:00 IST (UTC+1)				Venue: O'Moore Park
		Report		Referee: Maurice Deegan (Laois); TV: Sky Sports

7 July 2018 Round 4	Fermanagh	0–18 (18) – (29) 3–20	Kildare	Navan
19:00 IST (UTC+1)				Venue: Páirc Tailteann
		Report		Referee: Conor Lane (Cork); TV: Sky Sports

8 July 2018 Round 4	Laois	1–11 (14) – (19) 0–19	Monaghan	Navan
14:00 IST (UTC+1)				Venue: Páirc Tailteann
		Report		Referee: Derek O'Mahony (Tipperary)

=== Group stage ===
==== Super 8s ====
Format

The four provincial champions and the four winning teams from round four of the All-Ireland qualifiers play three games each in two groups of four teams during the months of July and August. Each group consists of two provincial champions and the two losing finalists of the other two provinces or the team that beats them in round four of the qualifiers.

In the first round (officially phase one) the two provincial champions play each other and the two round four qualifiers play each other in Croke Park. In rounds two and three (phases two and three) the provincial champions play the two qualifiers. In phase two the qualifiers have home advantage and the provincial winners are at home in phase three. Dublin, if they qualify, to also play their home game at Croke Park.

Two points are awarded for a win and one point for a draw. The top two teams in each group advance to the All-Ireland semi-finals.

Tie-breaker

If only two teams are level on group points –

- The team that won the head-to-head match is ranked first
- If this game was a draw, score difference (total scored minus total conceded in all group games) is used to rank the teams
- If score difference is identical, total scored is used to rank the teams
- If still identical, a play-off is required

If three or more teams are level on group points, score difference is used to rank the teams.

===== Group 1 =====
Pos	Team	Pld	W	D	L	PF	PA	PD	Pts	Qualification
1	Monaghan	3	2	1	0	51	41	+10	5	Advance to semi-finals
2	Galway	3	2	0	1	43	45	−2	4	Advance to semi-finals
3	Kerry	3	1	1	1	67	58	+9	3	
4	Kildare	3	0	0	3	51	68	−17	0	

Updated to match(es) played on 4 August 2018. Source: GAA.ie

15 July 2018 Phase 1	Kildare	1–10 (13) – (15) 0–15	Monaghan	Dublin
14:00 IST (UTC+1)		(HT: 1-05 – 0–10)		Venue: Croke Park
	Gls: D Flynn 1 Pts: N Flynn 4 (2f), J Byrne, D Flynn 1, K Feely 1 (1f), T Moolick 1, F Conway 1, E Callaghan 1	Report	Pts: C McManus 4 (2f), K O'Connell 3, C McCarthy 2, N Kearns 2, R Beggan 2 (1f, 1 '45), K Duffy 1, S Carey 1	Referee: Anthony Nolan (Wicklow); Attendance: 30,740 (double header); TV: Sky Sports

15 July 2018 Phase 1	Kerry	1–10 (13) – (16) 1–13	Galway	Dublin
16:00 IST (UTC+1)		(HT: 0-05 – 0-06)		Venue: Croke Park
	Gls: D Clifford 1 Pts: D Clifford 5 (1f), P Geaney 2, S Murphy 1 (1 '45), K McCarthy 1, S O'Brien 1	Report	Gls: P Sweeney 1 Pts: S Walsh 5 (4f), I Burke 2, A Varley 2, D Comer 1, P Conroy 1, S Kelly 1, D Kyne 1	Referee: Barry Cassidy (Derry); Attendance: 30,740 (double header); TV: RTÉ

22 July 2018 Phase 2	Kildare	0–16 (16) – (19) 0–19	Galway	Newbridge
14:00 IST (UTC+1)		(HT: 0–10 – 0–11)		Venue: St Conleth's Park
	Pts: N Flynn 5 (3f), P Cribbin 3, F Conway 2, D Flynn 2, P Brophy 2, K Flynn 1, C Healy 1	Report	Pts: S Walsh 4 (3f), D Comer 3, M Daly 2, G Bradshaw 1, J Heaney 1, C Sweeney 1, P Cooke 1, T Flynn 1, S Kelly 1, I Burke 1, E Brannigan 1, S Armstrong 1 G O'Donnell 1	Referee: Sean Hurson (Tyrone); Attendance: 8,200; TV: RTÉ

22 July 2018 Phase 2	Monaghan	1–17 (20) – (20) 1–17	Kerry	Clones
16:00 IST (UTC+1)		(HT: 1–11 – 0–10)		Venue: St Tiernach's Park
	Gls: C McManus 1 Pts: C McManus 9 (5f), R Beggan 4 (4f), K O'Connell 1, N Kearns 1, D Hughes 1, S Carey 1	Report	Gls: D Clifford 1 Pts: S O'Shea 8 (6f, 1 ’45), D Clifford 3, T O'Sullivan 2, P Murphy 1, D Moran 1, S O'Brien 1 (1f), A Maher 1	Referee: Maurice Deegan (Laois); Attendance: 17,022; TV: RTÉ

4 August 2018 Phase 3	Kerry	3–25 (34) – (22) 2–16	Kildare	Killarney
18:00 IST (UTC+1)		(HT: 1-08 – 1–12)		Venue: Fitzgerald Stadium
	Gls: D Clifford 2 (1 pen), J O'Donoghue 1 Pts: D Clifford 6 (1f), S O'Shea 5 (3f, 2 '45'), J Barry 3, M Burns 2, P Geaney 2 (1f), J O'Donoghue 2, D Moran 1, S O'Brien 1, K Donaghy 1, K McCarthy 1, T Morley 1	Report	Gls: P Cribbin 1, N Flynn 1 Pts: P Cribbin 5, N Flynn 3 (1f, 1 '45'), K Feely 3 (3f), P Kelly 1, J Byrne 1, K Flynn 1, T Moolick 1, N Kelly 1	Referee: Derek O'Mahoney (Tipperary); Attendance: 17,935; TV: Sky Sports

4 August 2018 Phase 3	Galway	0–08 (8) – (16) 0–16	Monaghan	Salthill
18:00 IST (UTC+1)		(HT: 0-05 – 0-07)		Venue: Pearse Stadium
	Pts: S Walsh 2 (2f), E Brannigan 2, P Cooke 1, G O’Donnell 1, D Comer 1, I Burke 1	Report	Pts: C McManus 5 (4f), R McAnespie 4, D Hughes 2, F Kelly 1, V Corey 1, C Walshe 1, D Malone 1, R Beggan 1 (1f)	Referee: Conor Lane (Cork); Attendance: 15,156; TV: Sky Sports

===== Group 2 =====
Pos	Team	Pld	W	D	L	PF	PA	PD	Pts	Qualification
1	Dublin	3	3	0	0	74	52	+22	6	Advance to semi-finals
2	Tyrone	3	2	0	1	73	51	+22	4	Advance to semi-finals
3	Donegal	3	1	0	2	52	57	−5	2	
4	Roscommon	3	0	0	3	53	92	−39	0	

Updated to match(es) played on 5 August 2018. Source: GAA.ie

14 July 2018 Phase 1	Tyrone	4–24 (36) – (18) 2–12	Roscommon	Dublin
17:00 IST (UTC+1)		(HT: 1–10 – 0-06)		Venue: Croke Park
	Gls: P Harte 1, N Sludden 1, C Meyler 1, R Donnelly 1 Pts: R Donnelly 4, C McAliskey 4 (3f), P Harte 3 (3f), N Sludden 2, C McShane 2, M Bradley 2, M McKernan 1, R McNamee 1, T McCann 1, M Donnelly 1, C Meyler 1, D McClure 1, R Brennan 1	Report	Gls: E Smith 1, C Murtagh 1 Pts: D Murtagh 5 (3f), C Murtagh 3 (2f), C Devaney 1, F Cregg 1, C Daly 1, P Kelly 1	Referee: David Gough (Meath); Attendance: 53,501 (double header); TV: Sky Sports

14 July 2018 Phase 1	Dublin	2–15 (21) – (16) 0–16	Donegal	Dublin
19:00 IST (UTC+1)		(HT: 1-09 – 0-08)		Venue: Croke Park
	Gls: N Scully 2 Pts: D Rock 7 (5f, 1 '45'), B Howard 2, C Costello 2, P Flynn 2, C Kilkenny 1, J McCarthy 1	Report	Pts: M Murphy 6 (3f, 1 '45'), J Brennan 3, M Langan 2, R McHugh 2, C Thompson 1, F McGlynn 1, É Doherty 1	Referee: Conor Lane (Cork); Attendance: 53,501 (double header); TV: RTÉ

21 July 2018 Phase 2	Tyrone	0–14 (14) – (17) 1–14	Dublin	Omagh
19:00 IST (UTC+1)		(HT: 0-05 – 0-07)		Venue: Healy Park
	Pts: P Harte 3 (2f), C McAliskey 2 (1 '45), C McShane 2, K McGeary 2, M McKernan 1, T McCann 1, F Burns 1, M Bradley 1, H Loughran 1	Report	Gls: J McCarthy 1 Pts: D Rock 6 (4f), C Kilkenny 2, P McMahon 1, B Howard 1, J Small 1, J McCaffrey 1, K McManamon 1, P Flynn 1	Referee: David Coldrick (Meath); Attendance: 16,205; TV: Sky Sports

21 July 2018 Phase 2	Roscommon	0–13 (13) – (20) 0–20	Donegal	Roscommon
17:00 IST (UTC+1)		(HT: 0-05 – 0–10)		Venue: Dr Hyde Park
	Pts: C Murtagh 5 (3f), D Murtagh 2, B Stack 2, C Lennon 2, C Compton 1, E Smith 1	Report	Pts: M Murphy 9 (3f, 1'45), OM Niallais 4, C Thompson 2 (1f), M Langan 1, L McLoone 1, J Brennan 1, R McHugh 1, M Reilly 1	Referee: Ciaran Branagan (Down); Attendance: 9,583; TV: Sky Sports

5 August 2018 Phase 3	Dublin	4–24 (36) – (22) 2–16	Roscommon	Dublin
15:30 IST (UTC+1)		(HT: 2–12 – 0-07)		Venue: Croke Park
	Gls: E O’Gara 2, P Flynn 1, MD Macauley 1 Pts: C Costello 9 (1 45, 1f), K McManamon 3 (2f), P Flynn 3, P Andrews 2, C McHugh 2, E O’Gara 2, P McMahon 1, J Small 1, MD Macauley 1, M Schutte 1, P Small 1	Report	Gls: G Patterson 1, D Smith 1 Pts: D Murtagh 6 (2f), D Smith 3 (1 45), C Lennon 2, P Kelly 2, N Kilroy 1, C Murtagh 1 (1f), C Devaney 1	Referee: Cormac Reilly (Meath); Attendance: 33,240; TV: RTÉ News Now

5 August 2018 Phase 3	Donegal	1–13 (16) – (23) 2–17	Tyrone	Ballybofey
15:30 IST (UTC+1)		(HT: 1-06 – 0-06)		Venue: MacCumhaill Park
	Gls: M Murphy 1 Pts: J Brennan 3, M Murphy 2 (1f, 1 45’), OM Niallais 2, P McGrath 1, EB Gallagher 1, M Langan 1, R McHugh 1, C Thompson 1, N O’Donnell 1	Report	Gls: H Loughran 1, D McClure 1 Pts: L Brennan 4 (1f), C McAliskey 2 (2f), P Hampsey 2, M Donnelly 2, N Morgan 1 (1f), R McNamee 1, T McCann 1, P Harte 1 (1f), C Cavanagh 1, M Bradley 1, K McGeary 1	Referee: Joe McQuillan (Cavan); Attendance: 16,242; TV: RTÉ

=== Knockout stage ===
==== Bracket ====
Semi-Finals
Dublin	1–24
Galway	2–12
Tyrone	1–13
Monaghan	0–15

Final
Dublin	2–17
Tyrone	1–14

==== Semi-finals ====
The winner of Group 1 played the runner-up of Group 2, while the winner of Group 2 played the runner-up of Group 1.

RTÉ
Sky Sports

11 August 2018
17:00 IST (UTC+1)
Semi-final

Report

Dublin	1–24 (27) – (18) 2–12	Galway
(HT: 1-09 – 1-07)
Gls: C O’Callaghan 1 Pts: D Rock 5 (4f), P Mannion 4, C Costello 3 (1f), C O’Callaghan 3, C Kilkenny 3, B Fenton 2, K McManamon 2, B Howard 1, P Flynn 1		Gls: S Walsh 1, D Comer 1 Pts: S Walsh 5 (3f), I Burke 2, J Heaney 1, T Flynn 1, D Comer 1, M Daly 1, G O’Donnell 1

Croke Park, Dublin
Referee: Barry Cassidy (Bellaghy, Derry)
Attendance: 54,716

RTÉ
Sky Sports

12 August 2018
15:30 IST (UTC+1)
Semi-final

Report

Monaghan	0–15 (15) – (16) 1–13	Tyrone
(HT: 0-08 – 0-08)
Pts: C McManus 7 (6f), C McCarthy 3, K Hughes 2, R Beggan 1 (1f), D Wylie 1, F Kelly 1		Gls: N Sludden 1 Pts: C McAliskey 4 (2f), P Harte 2 (1f), N Sludden 2, L Brennan 1 (1f), T McCann 1, F Burns 1, C Cavanagh 1, C McShane 1

Croke Park, Dublin
Referee: Anthony Nolan (Wicklow)
Attendance: 49,696

==== Final ====
The final was initially planned for 26 August 2018. It was rescheduled to 2 September to avoid a clash with the visit of Pope Francis to Ireland for the World Meeting of Families 2018.

RTÉ
Sky Sports

2 September 2018
15:30 IST (UTC+1)
Final

Report

Dublin	2–17 (23) – (17) 1–14	Tyrone
(HT: 2-07 – 0-06)
Gls: Paul Mannion 1 (pen), Niall Scully 1 Pts: Dean Rock 7 (3f, 1 ’45), Ciaran Kilkenny 3, Brian Fenton 2, Paul Mannion 1, Brian Howard 1, Kevin McManamon 1, Michael Darragh MacAuley 1, Jack McCaffrey 1		Gls: Peter Harte 1 (pen); Pts: Connor McAliskey 3 (1f), Lee Brennan 3 (3f), Cathal McShane 2, Mark Bradley 2, Peter Harte 1 (1f), Tiernan McCann 1, Kieran McGeary 1, Padraig Hampsey 1

Croke Park, Dublin
Referee: Conor Lane (Cork)
Attendance: 82,300

== Stadia and locations ==
Each team has a nominal home stadium, though not all teams are guaranteed a home game over the course of the Championship. In addition, games may be played at neutral or alternate venues. For example, Dublin have not played a Championship game in Parnell Park, their nominal home, since the 2004 Championship.

Team	Location	Stadium	Stadium capacity
Antrim	Belfast	Casement Park (Note: Casement Park was not in use this season, as redevelopment was planned for the ground.)	32,500
Armagh	Armagh	Athletic Grounds	19,500
Carlow	Carlow	Dr Cullen Park	21,000
Cavan	Cavan	Breffni Park	32,000
Clare	Ennis	Cusack Park	19,000
Cork	Cork	Páirc Uí Chaoimh	45,000
Derry	Derry	Celtic Park	22,000
Donegal	Ballybofey	MacCumhaill Park	18,000
Down	Newry	Páirc Esler	25,000
Dublin	Dublin	Parnell Park	12,000
Fermanagh	Enniskillen	Brewster Park	20,000
Galway	Galway	Pearse Stadium	26,197
Kerry	Killarney	Fitzgerald Stadium	43,180
Kildare	Newbridge	St Conleth's Park	6,200
Laois	Portlaoise	O'Moore Park	27,000
Leitrim	Carrick-on-Shannon	Páirc Seán Mac Diarmada	9,331
Limerick	Limerick	Gaelic Grounds	49,866

Team	Location	Stadium	Stadium capacity
London	Ruislip	McGovern Park	5,000
Longford	Longford	Pearse Park	10,000
Louth	Drogheda	Drogheda Park	7,000
Mayo	Castlebar	MacHale Park	42,000
Meath	Navan	Páirc Tailteann	10,000
Monaghan	Clones	St Tiernach's Park	36,000
New York	Kingsbridge	Gaelic Park	2,000
Offaly	Tullamore	O'Connor Park	20,000
Roscommon	Roscommon	Dr Hyde Park	25,000
Sligo	Sligo	Markievicz Park	18,558
Tipperary	Thurles	Semple Stadium	53,500
Tyrone	Omagh	Healy Park	26,500
Waterford	Waterford	Walsh Park	9,000
Westmeath	Mullingar	Cusack Park	11,000
Wexford	Wexford	Wexford Park	20,000
Wicklow	Aughrim	Aughrim County Ground	10,000

== Referees Panel ==
As announced in April 2018:

Marty Duffy (Sligo) retired at the end of 2017 and Rory Hickey (Clare) was ruled out for 2018 due to injury. This was a first year as a referee in the SFC for Martin McNally (Monaghan).

It would be the end for Pádraig Hughes (Armagh) as London v Louth in the Round 1 Qualifier was the last we saw of him in SFC action as referee. It would also be the end for Cormac Reilly (Meath) as Dublin v Roscommon in Phase 3 of Group 2 was the last we saw of him in SFC action as referee.

Championship Panel
Name	County	Club	Matches refereed
BRANAGAN, Ciarán	Down		
CASSIDY, Barry	Derry	Bellaghy	
COLDRICK, David	Meath	Blackhall Gaels	
CULLEN, Niall	Fermanagh		
DEEGAN, Maurice	Laois	Stradbally	
GOUGH, David	Meath	Slane	
HENRY, Jerome	Mayo		
HUGHES, Pádraig	Armagh		
HURSON, Sean	Tyrone	Galbally Pearses	
KELLY, Fergal	Longford		
LANE, Conor	Cork	Banteer	
MCNALLY, Martin	Monaghan	Corduff	
MCQUILLAN, Joe	Cavan	Kill Shamrocks	
MOONEY, Noel	Cavan		
NEILAN, Paddy	Roscommon	St Faithleach's	
NOLAN, Annthony	Wicklow		
O'MAHONEY, Derek	Tipperary		
REILLY, Cormac	Meath		

Linesman Panel

1. James Bermingham (Cork)
2. Brendan Cawley (Kildare)
3. Liam Devenney (Mayo)
4. Paul Faloon (Down)
5. Sean Lonergan (Tipperary)
6. James Molloy (Galway)
7. Padraig O'Sullivan (Kerry)
8. Barry Tiernan (Dublin)

== Statistics ==
- All scores correct as of 4 September 2018

=== Top scorer: overall ===
Rank	Player	County	Tally	Total	Matches	Average
1	Conor McManus	Monaghan	2–47	53	9	5.89
2	Dean Rock	Dublin	2–41	47	7	6.7
2	Connor McAliskey	Tyrone	2–41	47	10	4.7
4	Michael Murphy	Donegal	1–34	37	7	5.29
5	Shane Walsh	Galway	1–32	35	7	5.0
6	Paul Broderick	Carlow	1–29	32	4	8
6	Neil Flynn	Kildare	2–26	32	8	4
8	Cillian O'Connor	Mayo	3–22	31	4	7.75
9	David Clifford	Kerry	4–18	30	5	6
9	Rory Grugan	Armagh	2–24	30	5	6
9	Diarmuid Murtagh	Roscommon	0–30	30	6	5.0
9	Ciarán Kilkenny	Dublin	2–24	30	7	4.2

=== Top scorer: from play ===
- As of 4 September 2018

Rank	Player	County	Tally	Total	Matches	Average
1	Ciarán Kilkenny	Dublin	2–24	30	7	4.2
2	David Clifford	Kerry	3–15	24	5	4.8
2	Connor McAliskey	Tyrone	2–18	24	10	2.4
4	Daniel Flynn	Kildare	4–10	22	8	2.75
5	Neil Flynn	Kildare	2–15	21	8	2.6

=== Top scorer: single game ===
Rank	Player	County	Tally	Total	Opposition
1	Cillian O'Connor	Mayo	3-09	18	Limerick
2	William Woods	Louth	0–13	13	London
3	Conor McManus	Monaghan	1-09	12	Kerry
3	David Clifford	Kerry	2-06	12	Kildare
5	Paul Broderick	Carlow	0–11	11	Kildare
5	Paul Broderick	Carlow	1-08	11	Louth
5	Connor McAliskey	Tyrone	1-08	11	Meath
5	Paul Kinsgston	Laois	3-02	11	Westmeath
9	Luke Connolly	Cork	0–10	10	Tipperary
9	Adrian Moyles	London	0–10	10	Louth
9	Ciarán Kilkenny	Dublin	1-07	10	Wicklow

=== Scoring events ===
- Widest winning margin: 27 points
  - Waterford 0-09 – 5–21 Monaghan (Qualifiers)
- Most goals in a match: 8
  - Limerick 3-07 – 5–19 Mayo (Qualifiers)
- Most points in a match: 45
  - London 1–19 – 2–26 Louth (Qualifiers)
- Most goals by one team in a match: 5
  - Waterford 0-09 – 5–21 Monaghan (Qualifiers)
  - Limerick 3-07 – 5–19 Mayo (Qualifiers)
- Highest aggregate score: 58 points
  - Dublin 4–24 – 2–16 Roscommon (Super 8s)
- Lowest aggregate score: 19 points
  - Fermanagh 0–12 – 0-07 Armagh (Ulster SFC)

=== Roll of Honour ===
- Kerry – 37 (2014)
- Dublin – 28 (2018)
- Galway – 9 (2001)
- Cork – 7 (2010)
- Meath – 7 (1999)
- Down – 5 (1994)
- Wexford – 5 (1918)
- Cavan – 5 (1952)
- Kildare – 4 (1928)
- Tipperary – 4 (1920)
- Tyrone – 3 (2008)
- Offaly – 3 (1982)
- Louth – 3 (1957)
- Mayo – 3 (1951)
- Donegal – 2 (2012)
- Roscommon – 2 (1944)
- Limerick – 2 (1896)
- Derry – 1 (1993)
- Armagh – 1 (2002)

=== Miscellaneous ===
- Fermanagh beat Armagh in the Ulster championship for the first time since 1966.
- Carlow beat Kildare in the Leinster championship for the first time since 1953.
- Longford beat Meath in the Leinster championship for the first time since 1982.
- Dublin played Wicklow in the Leinster championship for the first time since 1990.
- Galway beat Kerry in the All-Ireland championship for the first time since 1965.
- Galway reached the All-Ireland semi-final for the first time since 2001.
- Monaghan reached the All-Ireland semi-final for the first time since 1988.
- There were first time meetings in the championship for:
  - Waterford vs Wexford
  - London vs Louth
  - Offaly vs Antrim
  - Waterford vs Monaghan
  - Carlow vs Tyrone
  - Leitrim vs Monaghan
  - Armagh vs Clare
- Kerry won a 6th Munster title in a row for the first time since 8 in a row (1975–1982).
- The All Ireland semi-final between Dublin vs Galway was their first championship meeting since the All Ireland final 1983.
- Dublin won a record 8 Leinster titles in a row and are 4 time All-Ireland champions in a row, 100 years on from Wexford and the Kerry teams from (1929–1932) and (1978–1981).
- Dublin and Jim Gavin extend their record breaking unbeaten streak to 28 championship games in a row.
- Tyrone lost 3 Championship matches in one season making them the first team in history to do so.

== Television rights ==
RTÉ, the national broadcaster in Ireland, provide the majority of the live television coverage of the football championship in the second year of a five-year deal running from 2017 until 2021. In the UK, Premier Sports have exclusive coverage of 26 games including Sunday provincial games from all 4 regions, 1st/2nd choice of qualifiers from rounds 1 and 2 and 4 of the 12 quarter-final group matches. Sky Sports broadcast a number of matches and have exclusive rights to a number of games including some All-Ireland super 8 matches. BBC Northern Ireland showed at least two live games from the Ulster Championship and other games were shown in their entirety at a later time.

Live Football On TV Schedule
Date	Fixture & Match Details	Broad- caster
Provincial and Qualifier Matches
13 May	Mayo v Galway; Connacht Quarter-Final	RTÉ
3 June	Monaghan v Fermanagh; Ulster Semi-Final	BBC NI; RTÉ
9 June	Meath v Tyrone; Qualifiers Round 1	Sky Sports
10 June	Dublin v Longford; Leinster Semi-Final	RTÉ
17 June	Galway v Roscommon; Connacht Final	RTÉ
23 June	Tipperary v Mayo; Qualifiers Round 2	Sky Sports
23 June	Cork v Kerry; Munster Final	RTÉ
24 June	Donegal v Fermanagh; Ulster Final	BBC NI; RTÉ
24 June	Laois v Dublin; Leinster Final	RTÉ
30 June	Cavan v Tyrone; Qualifiers Round 3	Sky Sports
30 June	Kildare v Mayo; Qualifiers Round 3	Sky Sports
7 July	Roscommon v Armagh; Qualifiers Round 4	RTÉ
7 July	Cork v Tyrone; Qualifiers Round 4	Sky Sports
7 July	Fermanagh v Kildare; Qualifiers Round 4	Sky Sports
All-Ireland Quarter-Final Group Stage
14 July	Tyrone v Roscommon; Phase 1 Group 2	Sky Sports
14 July	Dublin v Donegal; Phase 1 Group 2	RTÉ
15 July	Kildare v Monaghan; Phase 1 Group 1	Sky Sports
15 July	Kerry v Galway; Phase 1 Group 1	RTÉ
21 July	Roscommon v Donegal; Phase 2 Group 2	Sky Sports
21 July	Tyrone v Dublin; Phase 2 Group 2	Sky Sports
22 July	Kildare v Galway; Phase 2 Group 1	RTÉ
22 July	Monaghan v Kerry; Phase 2 Group 1	RTÉ
4 August	Kerry v Kildare; Phase 3 Group 1	Sky Sports
4 August	Galway v Monaghan; Phase 3 Group 1	Sky Sports
5 August	Dublin v Roscommon; Phase 3 Group 2	RTÉ
5 August	Donegal v Tyrone; Phase 3 Group 2	RTÉ
Knockout Stage
All-Ireland Football Semi-Finals
11 August	Dublin v Galway	RTÉ; Sky Sports
12 August	Monaghan v Tyrone	RTÉ; Sky Sports
All-Ireland Football Final
2 September	Dublin v Tyrone	RTÉ; Sky Sports

== Awards ==
=== The Sunday Game Team of the Year ===
The Sunday Game team of the year was picked on 2 September, the night of the final. Dublin's Ciarán Kilkenny was named as The Sunday Game player of the year.

1. Stephen Cluxton (Dublin)
2. Jonny Cooper (Dublin)
3. Pádraig Hampsey (Tyrone)
4. Eoghan Bán Gallagher (Donegal)
5. Karl O'Connell (Monaghan)
6. James McCarthy (Dublin)
7. Jack McCaffrey (Dublin)
8. Brian Fenton (Dublin)
9. Colm Cavanagh (Tyrone)
10. Shane Walsh (Galway)
11. Ciarán Kilkenny (Dublin)
12. Brian Howard (Dublin)
13. Paul Mannion (Dublin)
14. Conor McManus (Monaghan)
15. David Clifford (Kerry)

=== All Star Team of the Year ===
The football All Stars were revealed on 1 November 2018 and were presented on 2 November at an awards ceremony at the Convention Centre in Dublin.

1. Rory Beggan (Monaghan)
2. Jonny Cooper (Dublin)
3. Colm Cavanagh (Tyrone)
4. Pádraig Hampsey (Tyrone)
5. Karl O'Connell (Monaghan)
6. James McCarthy (Dublin)
7. Jack McCaffrey (Dublin)
8. Brian Fenton (Dublin)
9. Brian Howard (Dublin)
10. Paul Mannion (Dublin)
11. Ciarán Kilkenny (Dublin)
12. Ryan McHugh (Donegal)
13. David Clifford (Kerry)
14. Conor McManus (Monaghan)
15. Ian Burke (Galway)

=== Footballer of the Year ===
Brian Fenton (Dublin)

=== Young Footballer of the Year ===
David Clifford (Kerry)
