= 2017 Down county football team season =

Down county football team
2017 season
- Manager: Éamonn Burns
- Stadium: Páirc Esler, Newry
- NFL D2: 6th
- All-Ireland SFC: Round 4 qualifier
- Ulster SFC: Finalist
- Dr McKenna Cup: Group Stage (3rd)

The following is a summary of Down county football team's 2017 season.

== Kits ==
Home	Away

== Competitions ==
Win Draw Loss Postponed/Cancelled

=== Dr McKenna Cup ===
Down started 2017 with a win against Queen's University, their first win since beating St Marys in the 2016 McKenna Cup competition. Down followed it up with a win against Derry at Páirc Esler, their first back to back win in nearly two years and first inter-county win since beat Laois in the National Football League on 4 April 2015. Down's McKenna Cup campaign ended with a defeat away to Armagh which sent Derry into the semi-finals on points difference.

==== Fixtures ====
Date	Round	Home	Score	Away	Ground	Ref
8 Jan	Group	Down	1-11 v 1-08	Queens University	Páirc Esler, Newry	
15 Jan	Group	Down	0-15 v 0-14	Derry	Páirc Esler, Newry	
18 Jan	Group	Armagh	1-15 v 2-08	Down	Athletic Grounds, Armagh	

==== Table ====
Qualify for Division 2 final and automatic promotion to Division 1 Automatic relegation to Division 3

Team	Pld	W	D	L	F	A	Diff	Pts
Galway	7	5	1	1	12-99	6-86	31	11
Kildare	7	5	0	2	11-102	3-94	32	10
Meath	7	4	1	2	11-107	5-91	34	9
Cork	7	2	3	2	4-90	6-86	-2	7
Clare	7	2	1	4	9-78	6-99	-12	5
Down	7	2	1	4	3-85	10-85	-18	5
Derry	7	2	1	4	8-79	11-104	-34	5
Fermanagh	7	2	0	5	1-87	12-85	-31	4

- Clare, Down and Derry finished on five league points and are ranked by score difference.

=== National Football League Division 2 ===
Down played in Division Two of the National Football League in 2017 following relegation from Division One in 2016. Down had a dismal start to their campaign suffering a defeat at home to Fermanagh followed by an away defeat to Clare. Reports began to circulate that Eamon Burns was facing a mass walk out from players in the squad, this was later denied by Burns and Down went on to win their next two games.

The two wins in a row proofed to be crucial as Down went on to lose another two games leaving their Division Two status hanging in the balance. Down finished their Division Two campaign with a surprise draw away to Cork, which resulted in them retaining their place in Division Two for 2018.

==== Fixtures ====
Date	Round	Home	Score	Away	Ground	Ref
4 Feb	Group	Down	0-10 v 1-16	Fermanagh	Páirc Esler, Newry	
12 Feb	Group	Clare	2-11 v 0-11	Down	Cusack Park, Ennis	
25 Feb	Group	Down	1-13 v 0-14	Meath	Páirc Esler, Newry	
5 Mar	Group	Derry	1-07 v 1- 15	Down	Celtic Park, Derry	
18 Mar	Group	Down	0-10 v 2-09	Kildare	Páirc Esler, Newry	
26 Mar	Group	Down	1-13 v 3-15	Galway	Páirc Esler, Newry	
2 Apr	Group	Cork	1-10 v 0-13	Down	Páirc Uí Rinn, Cork	

==== Table ====
Qualify for Division 2 final and automatic promotion to Division 1 Automatic relegation to Division 3

Team	Pld	W	D	L	F	A	Diff	Pts
Galway	7	5	1	1	12-99	6-86	31	11
Kildare	7	5	0	2	11-102	3-94	32	10
Meath	7	4	1	2	11-107	5-91	34	9
Cork	7	2	3	2	4-90	6-86	-2	7
Clare	7	2	1	4	9-78	6-99	-12	5
Down	7	2	1	4	3-85	10-85	-18	5
Derry	7	2	1	4	8-79	11-104	-34	5
Fermanagh	7	2	0	5	1-87	12-85	-31	4

- Clare, Down and Derry finished on five league points and are ranked by score difference

==== Results ====
4 February 2017
19:00
Round 1

Down	0-10 - 1-16	Fermanagh
Alan Davidson 0-5 (2fs, 1 45), Shay Millar, Conail McGovern, Kevin McKernan, Joe Murphy, Aidan Carr 0-1 each	Report	Tomas Corrigan 0-8 (7fs), Eoin McManus 1-0, Aidan Breen 0-2, Sean Quigley, Eddie Courtney, Paul McCusker, Barry Mulrone, Cathal Beacom, Ryan Lyons 0-1 each.

Páirc Esler, Newry
Referee: F Kelly (Longford)
12 February 2017
14:00
Round 2

Clare	2-11 - 0-11	Down
D Tubridy (1-3), K Sexton (1-1), E Cleary (0-3, 1f), J Malone (0-3), S Collins (0-1)	Report	C Magee (0-3, 2f), B O'Hagan (0-2, 1f), R Johnston (0-2), D O'Hagan (0-1), A Carr (0-1), S Millar (0-1), P Havern (0-1)

Cusack Park, Ennis
Referee: Noel Mooney (Cavan)
25 February 2017
19:00
Round 3

Down	1-13 - 0-14	Meath
D O'Hanlon (0-4, 3f), K McKernan (0-2), B O'Hagan (0-2), R Johnston (0-1), J Johnston (0-1), C McGovern (0-1), A Carr (0-1), C Maginn (0-1), J Murphy (1-0)	Report	D Lenihan (0-8, 6f), J Toher (0-2, 1f), G Reilly (0-2), B McMahon (0-1), D Keogan (0-1)

Páirc Esler, Newry
Referee: Padraig O'Sullivan (Kerry)
5 March 2017
14:30
Round 4

Derry	1-07 - 1-15	Down
Emmett McGuckin (1-2), Conor McAtamney (0-2), Mark Craig (0-1), Benny Heron (0-1), James Kielt (0-1, 1f)	Report	Darragh O Hanlon (0-6, 5f), Ryan Johnston (1-1), Caolan Mooney (0-3), Barry O'Hagan (0-3), Conor Maginn (0-1), Joe Murphy (0-1)

Celtic Park, Derry
Referee: Paddy Neilan (Roscommon)
18 March 2017
19:00
Round 5

Down	0-10 - 2-09	Kildare
D O'Hanlon (0-04f), B O’Hagan (0-02), C Mooney (0-02), K McKernan (0-01), J Johnston (0-01)	Report	D Slattery (2-00), K Feely (0-05f), M Donnellan (0-01, 45), O Lyons (0-01), T Moolick (0-01), P Cribbin (0-01)

Páirc Esler, Newry
Referee: N Cullen (Fermanagh)
26 March 2017
15:00
Round 6

Down	1-13 - 3-15	Galway
D O'Hanlon (0-8, 5f), B O'Hagan (1-0), C Mooney (0-2), R Johnston (0-2), S Millar (0-1)	Report	E Brannigan (2-1, 1-0pen), S Walsh (1-3), G Sice (0-3, 1f), B McHugh (0-3, 2f, 1'45), G O'Donnell (0-2), D Kyne (0-1), M Farragher (0-1), P Conroy (0-1f),

Páirc Esler, Newry
Referee: Paddy Neilan (Roscommon)
2 April 2017
14:00
Round 7

Cork	1-10 - 0-13	Down
R Deane (1-01), C O’Neill (0-06, 0-04 frees), P Kerrigan (0-02), O’Rourke (0-01)	Report	J Johnston (0-05, 0-04 frees, 0-01 45), C Mooney (0-02), R Johnston (0-02); B O’Hagan (0-01), S Millar (0-01), M Cunningham (0-01, free), D O'Hanlon (0-01, free)

Páirc Uí Rinn, Cork
Referee: J Molloy (Galway)

=== Ulster Senior Football Championship ===
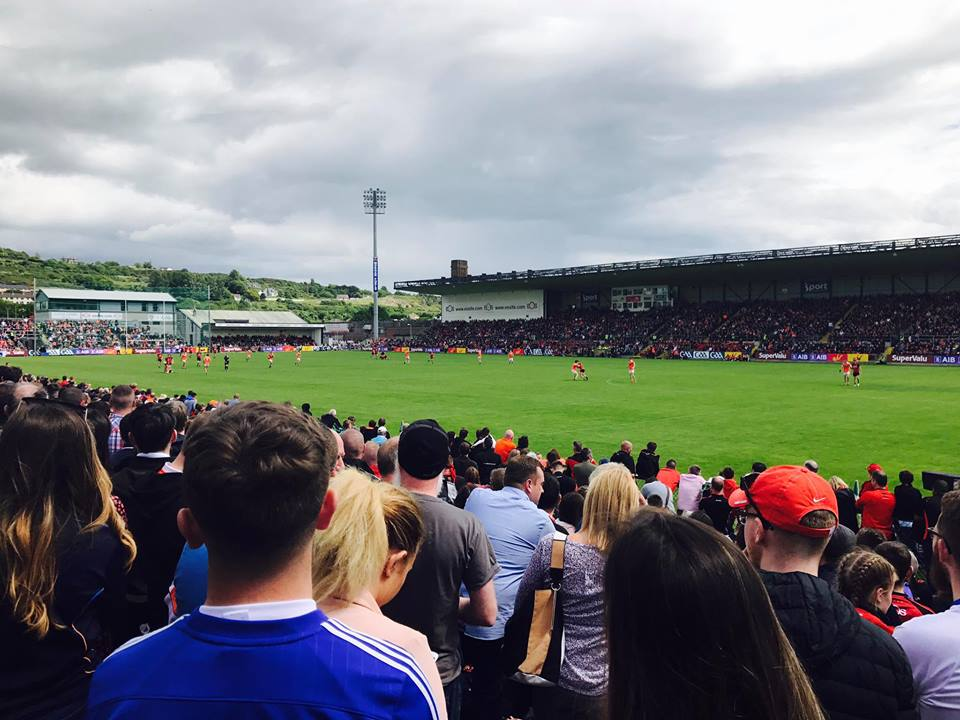
Down vs Armagh, 4 June 2017

The draw for the 2017 Ulster Senior Football Championship took place on 14 October 2016 with Down being drawn at home to Armagh. This was Down's first home draw in the Ulster Championship in 12 years since they faced Tyrone at home in the 2005 Ulster Championship.

Down edged out Armagh in a close, physical encounter at Páirc Esler sending them into the 2017 Ulster Championship semi-finals to face Monaghan at the Athletic Grounds in Armagh on 24 June 2017. Down produced a memorable display in a close semi-final as they pulled off arguably the shock of the 2017 Ulster Championship by beating Monaghan and earning themselves a place in the 2017 Ulster final against Tyrone on 16 July in Clones.

Down suffered a heavy defeat in the Ulster final, meaning they entered the All-Ireland series in round 4.

==== Fixtures ====
Date	Round	Team 1	Score	Team 2	Ground	Ref
Sunday 4 June	Quarter-final	Down	0-15 v 2-07	Armagh	Páirc Esler, Newry	
Saturday 24 June	Semi-final	Down	1-14 v 0-15	Monaghan	Athletic Grounds, Armagh	
Saturday 16 July	Final	Down	0-15 v 2-17	Tyrone	St. Tiernach's Park, Clones	

==== Bracket ====
Preliminary round
Monaghan	1-20
Fermanagh	1-11

Quarter-finals
Derry	0-11
Tyrone	0-22
Donegal	3-19
Antrim	1-9
Down	0-15
Armagh	2-7
Cavan	0-15
Monaghan	1-15

Semi-finals
Tyrone	1-21
Donegal	1-12
Down	1-14
Monaghan	0-15

Final
Tyrone	2-17
Down	0-15

==== Results ====
4 June 2017
14:00
Quarter-finals

Down	0-15 - 2-07	Armagh
M Cunningham (0-01, f), (0-04, 2f), C Mooney (0-02); C Maginn (0-01), S Millar (0-01); J Johnston (0-01, f), C Harrison (0-02), R Johnston (0-01), B O'Hagan (0-01), for Harrison (52), D McKibben (0-01)	Report	P Hughes (0-01); A McKay (0-01), M Shields (1-00); S Sheridan (0-01), A Forker (0-01), J Clarke (0-01, f), A Murnin (1-00), Vernon (42), A Duffy (0-01), G McParland (0-01, f)

Páirc Esler, Newry
Attendance: 16, 168
Referee: Conor Lane (Cork)
24 June 2017
19:00
Semi-finals

Down	1-14 - 0-15	Monaghan
M Cunningham (0-1'45); D O'Hanlon (1-5, 1-0pen, 0-5f), K McKernan (0-2), C Maginn (0-1), S Millar (0-1); C Harrison (0-3), D O'Hare (0-1)	Report	R Wylie (0-1); K Hughes (0-1), D Hughes (0-1); O Duffy (0-1); C McCarthy (0-1), J McCarron (0-3, 2f), C McManus (0-7, 3f).

Athletic Grounds, Armagh
Attendance: 13, 396
Referee: David Coldrick (Meath). Replaced by Paddy Neilan (Roscommon) at half-time.
16 July 2017
14:00
Final

Tyrone	2-17 - 0-15	Down
T McCann (0-1), P Hampsey (0-3), P Harte (0-2, 1f), C McCann (0-1), D Mulgrew (0-1), N Sludden (0-1), M Bradley (0-2), S Cavanagh (0-2, 1f), M Donnelly (0-3), L Brennan (0-1)	Report	M Cunningham (0-1f), D O'Hanlon (0-4, 3f), C Mooney (0-3), N Donnelly (0-1), C Maginn (0-1), S Millar (0-1), R Johnston (0-2), J Murphy (0-1), D McKibbin (0-1)

St Tiernach's Park, Clones
Attendance: 31, 912
Referee: Joe McQuillan (Cavan)

=== All-Ireland Senior Football Championship ===
Down entered the All Ireland in Round 4 of the qualifiers following their defeat to Tyrone in the Ulster final. Down were matched once again with Monaghan however in this encounter Down fell short and ended their championship season in Round 4.

==== Fixtures ====
Date	Round	Team 1	Score	Team 2	Ground	Ref
Saturday 29 July	Round 4	Down	1-16 v 1-24	Monaghan	Croke Park, Dublin	

==== Results ====
29 July 2017
5.00 PM
Round 4B

Down	1-16 - 1-24	Monaghan
D O'Hanlon (0-02, 0-02f), C Mooney (0-01), K McKernan (0-02), C Maginn (0-02), S Millar (0-01), C Harrison (1-04), J Johnston (0-03, 0-01f), D McKibbin (0-01)	Report	F Kelly (1-00), R Wylie (0-01), K Hughes (0-03, 0-01f), D Hughes (0-03), C McManus (0-10, 0-08f), O Duffy (0-01), J McCarron (0-02), C McCarthy (0-04)

Croke Park, Dublin
Referee: Maurice Deegan (Laois)
