= 2017 Ulster Senior Football Championship =

2017 Ulster SFC
Tournament details
- Year: 2017

Winners
- Champions: Tyrone (15th win)
- Manager: Mickey Harte
- Captain: Seán Cavanagh

Runners-up
- Runners-up: Down
- Manager: Éamonn Burns
- Captain: Kevin McKernan

The 2017 Ulster Senior Football Championship was the 129th instalment of the annual Ulster Senior Football Championship organised by the Ulster GAA. It is one of the four provincial competitions of the 2017 All-Ireland Senior Football Championship. The winners receive The Anglo-Celt Cup.

Tyrone are the defending champions. The draw for the Championship was made on 13 October 2016. Tyrone beat Down in the final with a score of 2-17 to 0-15.

== Teams ==
The Ulster championship is contested by the nine county teams in the province of Ulster.

Team	Colours	Sponsor	Manager	Captain	Most recent success
Team	Colours	Sponsor	Manager	Captain	All-Ireland	Provincial
Antrim	Saffron and white	Creagh Concrete	Frank Fitzsimmons; Gearoid Adams	Kevin Niblock		1951
Armagh	Orange and white	Simply Fruit	Kieran McGeeney	Ciarán McKeever	2002	2008
Cavan	Royal blue and white	Kingspan Group	Mattie McGleenan	Gearóid McKiernan	1952	1997
Derry	Red and white	H&A Mechanical Services	Damian Barton	Enda Lynn	1993	1998
Donegal	Gold and green	KN Group	Rory Gallagher	Michael Murphy	2012	2014
Down	Red and black	EOS IT Solutions	Éamonn Burns	Darren O'Hagan	1994	1994
Fermanagh	Green and white	Tracey Concrete	Pete McGrath	Eoin Donnelly
Monaghan	White and blue	Investec	Malachy O'Rourke	Conor McManus		2015
Tyrone	White and Red	McAleer & Rushe	Mickey Harte	Seán Cavanagh	2008	2016

== Championship draw ==
Preliminary round
Monaghan	1-20
Fermanagh	1-11

Quarter-finals
Derry	0-11
Tyrone	0-22
Donegal	3-19
Antrim	1-9
Down	0-15
Armagh	2-7
Cavan	0-15
Monaghan	1-15

Semi-finals
Tyrone	1-21
Donegal	1-12
Down	1-14
Monaghan	0-15

Final
Tyrone	2-17
Down	0-15

== Preliminary round ==
20 May 2017
7:00 pm

Monaghan	1-20 - 1-11	Fermanagh
Conor McManus 1-3 (0-1f), Owen Duffy 0-3, Colin Walshe, Jack McCarron (0-1f), Conor McCarthy 0-2 each, Fintan Kelly, Karl O'Connell, Neil McAdam, Kieran Hughes, Shane Carey, Gavin Doogan, Dermot Malone, Dessie Mone 0-1 each	Report	Tomas Corrigan 0-5 (0-4f), Ryan Lyons 1-0, Aidan Breen and Sean Quigley (0-1f) 0-2 each, Lee Cullen and Eddie Courtney 0-1 each

St Tiernach's Park, Clones, Clones
Attendance: 7,473
Referee: Derek O'Mahony (Tipperary)

== Quarter-finals ==
21 May 2017
4:00 pm

Donegal	3-19 - 1-09	Antrim
M Murphy 0-6 (5f), P McBrearty 1-2 (2f), J Brennan 1-1, C Thompson 0-4 (3f), P McGrath 1-0, M Langan 0-2, H McFadden, K Lacey, F McGlynn, M McHugh 0-1 each	Report	CJ McGourty 0-6 (6f), C Small 1-0, T McCann 0-2, S Beatty 0-1

MacCumhaill Park, Ballybofey, Ballybofey
Attendance: 10,083
Referee: Paddy Neilan (Roscommon)
28 May 2017
2:00 pm

Derry	0-11 - 0-22	Tyrone
Niall Loughlin 0-4 (0-3f), Niall Keenan, Ciaran McFaul, Carlus McWilliams, Danny Heavron (0-1f), Enda Lynn, Benny Heron (0-1f), Shane McGuigan (0-1f) 0-1 each	Report	Seán Cavanagh 0-7 (0-6f), Darren McCurry 0-3, Peter Harte (0-1f, 1 '45), Conal McCann, Lee Brennan (0-1f) 0-2 each, Tiernan McCann, Ruairi Brennan, Colm Cavanagh, Mark Bradley, David Mulgrew, Declan McClure 0-1 each

Celtic Park, Derry, Derry
Attendance: 10,017
Referee: Maurice Deegan (Laois)
4 June 2017
2:00 pm

Down	0-15 - 2-07	Armagh
Darragh O’Hanlon 0-4 (2f); Connaire Harrison 0-3; Caolan Mooney 0-2; Michael Cunningham (f), Jerome Johnston (f), Shea Millar, Conor Maginn, Barry O’Hagan, David McKibben 0-1 each	Report	Mark Shields, Andrew Murnin 1-0 each; Aaron McKay, Aidan Forker, Paul Hughes, Stephen Sheridan, Anthony Duffy, Gavin McParland (f), Jamie Clarke (f) 0-1 each

Páirc Esler, Newry, Newry
Attendance: 16,168
Referee: Conor Lane (Cork)
11 June 2017
2:00 pm

Cavan	0-15 - 1-15	Monaghan
Seanie Johnston 0-4 (4f); Cian Mackey 0-3; Niall McDermott 0-3 (3f); James McEnroe, Conor Moynagh, Liam Buchanan, Gearoid McKiernan, Martin Reilly (f) 0-1 each	Report	Conor McManus 1-4 (2f); Owen Duffy 0-4; Rory Beggan 0-3 (2 '45, 1f); Conor McCarthy 0-2; Colin Walshe, Jack McCarron 0-1 each.

Breffni Park, Cavan, Cavan
Attendance: 12,993
Referee: Paddy Neilan (Roscommon)

== Semi-finals ==
18 June 2017; 2:00 pm	Tyrone	1-21 - 1-12	Donegal	St Tiernach's Park, Clones; Attendance: 22,609; Referee: David Gough (Meath); Man of the Match: Pádraig Hampsey
18 June 2017; 2:00 pm	Tiernan McCann 1-1, Niall Sludden 0-4, Kieran McGeary 0-3, Mark Bradley 0-2, Mattie Donnelly 0-2, Peter Harte 0-2, Padraig Hampsey 0-2, David Mulgrew 0-1, Seán Cavanagh 0-1 (f), Declan McClure 0-1, Ronan O'Neill 0-1, Niall Morgan 0-1 (45).	Report	Patrick McBrearty 0-6 (2fs), Michael Murphy 0-3 (2 '45's), Micheal Carroll 1-0, Martin Reilly 0-1, Michael Langan 0-1, Hugh McFadden 0-1.	St Tiernach's Park, Clones; Attendance: 22,609; Referee: David Gough (Meath); Man of the Match: Pádraig Hampsey

24 June 2017; 7:00 pm	Down	1-14 - 0-15	Monaghan	Athletic Grounds, Armagh; Attendance: 13,396; Referee: David Coldrick / Paddy Neilan (Meath / Roscommon); Man of the Match: Connaire Harrison
24 June 2017; 7:00 pm	C Harrison 0-3, D O'Hanlon 1-5, S Millar, K McKernan 0-2, C Maginn, M Cunningham, D O'Hare	Report	R Wylie, D Hughes 0-2, J McCarron 0-3, C McManus 0-6, C McCarthy, O Duffy, K Hughes	Athletic Grounds, Armagh; Attendance: 13,396; Referee: David Coldrick / Paddy Neilan (Meath / Roscommon); Man of the Match: Connaire Harrison

== Final ==
16 July 2017; 2:00 pm	Tyrone	2-17 - 0-15	Down	St Tiernach's Park, Clones; Attendance: 31,912; Referee: Joe McQuillan (Cavan); Man of the Match: Pádraig Hampsey
16 July 2017; 2:00 pm	R O'Neill 2-0, P Hampsey 0-3, P Harte 0-2, M Donnelly 0-2, N Sludden 0-1, S Cavanagh 0-2, D Mulgrew 0-1, M Bradley 0-2, C McCann 0-1.	Report	S Millar 0-1, R Johnston 0-2, N Donnelly 0-1, D O’Hanlon 0-5, C Mooney 0-2, C Maginn 0-1, M Cunningham 0-1, J Murphy 0-1, D McKibbin 0-1.	St Tiernach's Park, Clones; Attendance: 31,912; Referee: Joe McQuillan (Cavan); Man of the Match: Pádraig Hampsey

== See also ==
- 2017 All-Ireland Senior Football Championship
  - 2017 Connacht Senior Football Championship
  - 2017 Leinster Senior Football Championship
  - 2017 Munster Senior Football Championship
