= 2016 Ulster Senior Football Championship =

2016 Ulster SFC
Tournament details
- Year: 2016

Winners
- Champions: Tyrone (14th win)
- Manager: Mickey Harte
- Captain: Seán Cavanagh

Runners-up
- Runners-up: Donegal
- Manager: Rory Gallagher
- Captain: Michael Murphy

The 2016 Ulster Senior Football Championship was the 128th instalment of the annual Ulster Senior Football Championship held under the auspices of the Ulster GAA. It is one of the four provincial competitions of the 2016 All-Ireland Senior Football Championship. The competition ran from to 15 May to 17 July 2016.

The draw for the Championship was made on 16 October 2015. As in the previous two seasons, the two sides were named as A and B, to allow for teams to more easily predict the dates of their qualifier matches. Armagh, Cavan, Derry, and Tyrone were named to the A side, with Antrim, Donegal, Down, Fermanagh and Monaghan on the B side.

Monaghan were the defending champions following their victory over Donegal in the final of the 2015 Championship.

Tyrone beat Donegal 0-13 to 0-11 in the 2016 final.

== Teams ==
The Ulster championship is contested by the nine county teams in the province of Ulster.

Team	Colours	Sponsor	Manager	Captain	Most recent success
Team	Colours	Sponsor	Manager	Captain	All-Ireland	Provincial
Antrim	Saffron and white	Creagh Concrete	Frank Fitzsimmons; Gearoid Adams	Kevin Niblock		1951
Armagh	Orange and white	Simply Fruit	Kieran McGeeney	Ciarán McKeever	2002	2008
Cavan	Royal blue and white	Kingspan Group	Terry Hyland	Gearóid McKiernan	1952	1997
Derry	Red and white	H&A Mechanical Services	Damian Barton	Chrissy McKaigue	1993	1998
Donegal	Gold and green	KN Group	Rory Gallagher	Michael Murphy	2012	2014
Down	Red and black	EOS IT Solutions	Éamonn Burns	Kevin McKernan	1994	1994
Fermanagh	Green and white	Tracey Concrete	Pete McGrath	Eoin Donnelly
Monaghan	White and blue	Investec	Malachy O'Rourke	Conor McManus		2015
Tyrone	White and Red	McAleer & Rushe	Mickey Harte	Seán Cavanagh	2008	2010

== Bracket ==
Preliminary round
Fermanagh	1-12
Antrim	0-9

Quarter-finals
Derry	0-12
Tyrone	3-14
Cavan	2-16
Armagh	0-14
Monaghan	2-22
Down	0-09
Donegal	2-12
Fermanagh	0-11

Semi-finals
Tyrone (R)	0-16; 5-18
Cavan (R)	3-07; 2-17
Monaghan (R)	0-14; 2-10
Donegal (R)	1-11; 0-17

Final
Tyrone	0-13
Donegal	0-11

== Preliminary round ==
15 May 2016
16:00
Preliminary round

Fermanagh	1-12 – 0-9	Antrim
T Corrigan (0-9), S Quigley (1-0), A Breen, D McCusker, S Quigley (0-1 each)	Report	T McCann (0-3), B Neeson (0-2), S Burke, J Carron, R Murray, M Sweeney (0-1 each)

Brewster Park, Enniskillen
Attendance: 9,124
Referee: Sean Hurson (Tyrone)

== Quarter-finals ==
22 May 2016
14:00
Quarter-Final

Derry	0-12 – 3-14	Tyrone
Kielt (0-5), R Bell, D Heavron (0-2 each), E Brown, M Lynch, K McKaigue (0-1 each)	Report	R O’Neill (2-2), D McCurry (0-4), P Harte (1-0), C McAliskey (0-2), S Cavanagh, M Donnelly, R Donnelly, C McShane, P McNulty, J Munroe (0-1 each)

Celtic Park (Derry), Derry
Attendance: 12,011
Referee: David Coldrick (Meath)

29 May 2016
15:30
Quarter-Final

Cavan	2-16 – 0-14	Armagh
S Johnston (0-7), D McVeety (1-1), M Reilly 1-0, G McKiernan (0-3), J Brady (0-2), R Galligan, D Givney, C Moynagh (0-1 each)	Report	S Campbell (0-7), E Rafferty (0-5), T Kernan (0-2)

Kingspan Breffni Park, Cavan
Attendance: 15,236
Referee: Eddie Kinsella (Laois)

5 June 2016
14:00
Quarter-Final

Monaghan	2-22 – 0-09	Down
C McManus (0-8), K Hughes (1-2), O Duffy (1-0), R Beggan (0-3), C McCarthy, D McKenna (0-2 each), S Carey, D Clerkin, D Malone, R McAnespie, K O’Connell (0-1 each)	Report	D O’Hare (0-3), C Maginn, D O’Hanlon (0-2 each), B O’Hagan, M Poland (0-1 each)

St Tiernach's Park, Clones
Attendance: 12,782
Referee: Conor Lane (Cork)

12 June 2016
14:00
Quarter-Final

Donegal	2-12 – 0-11	Fermanagh
O MacNiallais (2-1), P McBrearty (0-3), E McHugh, M O'Reilly (0-2 each), M McElhinney, C McFadden, F McGlynn, M Murphy (0-1 each)	Report	T Corrigan (0-7), E Donnelly, B Mulrone, R Jones, S Quigley (0-1 each)

MacCumhaill Park, Ballybofey
Attendance: 15,908
Referee: Maurice Deegan (Laois)

== Semi-finals ==
19 June 2016
14:00
Semi-Final

Tyrone	0-16 – 3-07	Cavan
R O’Neill (0-5), M Donnelly, C McAliskey (0-2 each), C Cavanagh, S Cavanagh, R Donnelly, P Harte, D McCurry, C McShane, N Sludden (0-1 each)	Report	D Givney (2-0), C Moynagh (1-0), T Corr, F Flanagan, R Galligan, C Mackey, D McVeety, N Murray, S Johnston (0-1 each)

St Tiernach's Park, Clones
Attendance: 19,141
Referee: David Gough (Meath)

25 June 2016
19:00
Semi-Final

Monaghan	0-14 – 1-11	Donegal
C McManus (0-8), C McCarthy, K O’Connell (0-2 each), S Carey, O Duffy (0-1 each)	Report	P McBrearty (0-5), M Murphy (0-3), O MacNiallais (1-0), K Lacey, E McHugh, C Toye (0-1 each)

Breffni Park, Cavan
Attendance: 16,287
Referee: Ciaran Branagan (Down)

2 July 2016
19:00
Semi-Final Replay

Monaghan	2-10 – 0-17	Donegal
C McManus (1-4), S Carey (1-1), J McCarron (0-2), C Boyle, O Duffy, C Walshe (0-1 each)	Report	M Murphy (0-5), P McBrearty (0-4), M O’Reilly (0-3), R Kavanagh, M McElhinney, F McGlynn, M McHugh, A Thompson (0-1 each)

Breffni Park, Cavan
Attendance: 17,174
Referee: Maurice Deegan (Laois)

3 July 2016
16:00
Semi-Final Replay

Tyrone	5-18 – 2-17	Cavan
P Harte (2-4), C McAliskey (1-2), M Bradley (1-1), R Brennan (1-0), M Donnelly (0-3), S Cavanagh, C McShane (0-2 each), J McMahon, N Morgan, J Munroe, N Sludden (0-1 each)	Report	G McKiernan (0-7), C Mackey (1-3), J Brady (1-0), C Moynagh (0-2), K Clarke, F Flanagan, R Galligan, D Givney, M Reilly (0-1 each)

St Tiernach's Park, Clones
Attendance: 20,223
Referee: David Coldrick (Meath)

== Final ==
17 July 2016
14:00
Final

Tyrone	0-13 – 0-11	Donegal
S Cavanagh (0-3), P Harte, N Morgan (0-2 each), R Brennan, C McCarron, D McCurry, C McGeary, C McShane, N Sludden (0-1 each)	Report	P McBrearty, R McHugh (0-3 each), O MacNiallais, M Murphy (0-2 each), C Toye (0-1)

St Tiernach's Park, Clones
Attendance: 33,433
Referee: David Coldrick (Meath)

== See also ==
- Fixtures and results
- 2016 All-Ireland Senior Football Championship
  - 2016 Connacht Senior Football Championship
  - 2016 Leinster Senior Football Championship
  - 2016 Munster Senior Football Championship
