= 2016 Down county football team season =

Down county football team
2016 season
- Manager: Éamonn Burns
- Stadium: Páirc Esler, Newry
- NFL D1: 8th (relegated)
- All-Ireland SFC: Round 1 qualifier
- Ulster SFC: Quarter-finalist
- Dr McKenna Cup: Group stage (2nd)

The following is a summary of Down county football team's 2016 season. It was a first season in charge for newly appointed Down manager Éamonn Burns.

== Kits ==
Home	Away

== Competitions ==
Win Draw Loss Postponed/Cancelled

=== Dr McKenna Cup ===
==== Fixtures ====
Date	Round	Home	Score	Away	Ground
3 Jan	Group	Donegal	1-11 v 0-11	Down	MacCumhaill Park, Ballybofey
10 Jan	Group	Down	0-08 v 0-14	Fermanagh	Páirc Esler, Newry
13 Jan	Group	Down	3-20 v 2-14	St Mary's	Páirc Esler, Newry

==== Table ====
Qualification for next round

Team	Pld	W	D	L	F	A	Diff	Pts
Fermanagh	3	3	0	0	1-39	0-30	12	6
Down	3	1	0	2	3-39	3-39	0	2
St Mary's	3	1	0	2	4-34	4-41	-7	2
Donegal	3	1	0	2	1-17	2-29	-15	2

=== National Football League Division 1 ===
Down played in Division One of the National Football League in 2016. The fixtures were announced on 16 November 2015.

==== Fixtures ====
Date	Round	Home	Score	Away	Ground
30 Jan	Group	Down	0-07 v 3-15	Donegal	Páirc Esler, Newry
7 Feb	Group	Monaghan	0-13 v 0-11	Down	St. Tiernach's Park, Clones
28 Feb	Group	Down	0-06 v 0-22	Kerry	Páirc Esler, Newry
6 Mar	Group	Roscommon	1-12 v 0-06	Down	Pearse Park, Longford
12 Mar	Group	Down	1-07 v 1-15	Dublin	Páirc Esler, Newry
27 Mar	Group	Cork	0-12 v 0-07	Down	Páirc Uí Chaoimh, Cork
3 Apr	Group	Mayo	1-19 v 1-16	Down	MacHale Park, Castlebar

==== Table ====
Compete in Division 1 semi-finals
Automatic relegation to Division 2

Team	Pld	W	D	L	F	A	Diff	Pts
Dublin	7	7	0	0	8-91	4-75	28	14
Kerry	7	5	0	2	5-109	5-77	32	10
Roscommon	7	4	0	3	9-98	8-77	24	8
Donegal	7	3	0	4	8-84	6-78	12	6
Mayo	7	3	0	4	5-88	7-91	-9	6
Monaghan	7	3	0	4	6-83	7-91	-11	6
Cork	7	3	0	4	9-89	9-105	-16	6
Down	7	0	0	7	2-60	6-108	-60	0

^{1}Donegal, Mayo, Monaghan and Cork are ranked by scoring difference.

==== Results ====
30/01/16; Round 1	Down	0-7 - 3-15	Donegal	Páirc Esler, Newry; Referee: David Gough (Meath)
30/01/16; Round 1	D O'Hare (0-4), A McConville (0-2), C McGovern (0-1)	Report	M Murphy (0-8), P McBrearty (1-3), R McHugh (2-0), L McLoone (0-2), C Thompson (0-1), F McGlynn (0-1)	Páirc Esler, Newry; Referee: David Gough (Meath)

07/02/16; Round 2	Monaghan	0-13 - 0-11	Down	St Tiernach's Park, Clones; Referee: C Reilly
07/02/16; Round 2	C McManus (0-2), O Duffy (0-2), R McAnespie (0-2), S Carey (0-2), D Malone (0-1), D McKenna (0-1), F Kelly (0-1), R Beggan (0-1), T Kerr (0-1)	Report	C Harrison (0-4), D O'Hanlon (0-3), S McArdle (0-2), M McKay (0-1), P Downey (0-1)	St Tiernach's Park, Clones; Referee: C Reilly

28/02/16; Round 3	Down	0-6 - 0-22	Kerry	Páirc Esler, Newry; Referee: M Duffy
28/02/16; Round 3	B O'Hagan (0-2), C Harrison (0-2), C Maginn (0-1), R Mallon (0-1)	Report	B Sheehan (0-6), D O'Sullivan (0-4), A Fitzgerald (0-3), BJ Keane (0-3), C Cooper (0-3), B O'Sullivan (0-2), S O'Brien (0-1)	Páirc Esler, Newry; Referee: M Duffy

06/03/16; Round 4	Roscommon	1-12 - 0-6	Down	Pearse Park, Longford; Referee: Barry Cassidy (Derry)
06/03/16; Round 4	C Murtagh (1-6), F Cregg (0-3), C Daly (0-2), C Cregg (0-1)	Report	C Harrison (0-2), B O'Hagan (0-1), D O'Hanlon (0-1), M Poland (0-1), P Devlin (0-1)	Pearse Park, Longford; Referee: Barry Cassidy (Derry)

12/03/16; Round 5	Down	1-7 - 1-15	Dublin	Páirc Esler, Newry; Referee: D O'Mahoney
12/03/16; Round 5	D O'Hare (1-2), J Murphy (0-2), D O'Hanlon (0-1), M McKay (0-1), P Devlin (0-1)	Report	C Costello (1-4), D Rock (0-3), C Kilkenny (0-2), K McManamon (0-2), P Flynn (0-2), J Cooper (0-1), P Andrews (0-1)	Páirc Esler, Newry; Referee: D O'Mahoney

27/03/16; Round 6	Cork	0-12 - 0-7	Down	Páirc Uí Rinn, Cork; Referee: Sean Hurson (Tyrone)
27/03/16; Round 6	C O'Neill (0-4), L Connolly (0-3), M Collins (0-3), P Kerrigan (0-2)	Report	D O'Hare (0-3), C McGovern (0-1), D O'Hanlon (0-1), M Cunningham (0-1), M Poland (0-1)	Páirc Uí Rinn, Cork; Referee: Sean Hurson (Tyrone)

03/04/16; Round 7	Mayo	1-19 - 1-16	Down	MacHale Park, Castlebar; Attendance: 8,352; Referee: Joe McQuillan (Cavan)
03/04/16; Round 7	E Regan (0-9), C O'Connor (1-4), A Freeman (0-2), A Moran (0-1), A O'Shea (0-1), C Barrett (0-1), J Doherty (0-1)	Report	D O'Hare (1-5), M Cunningham (0-2), S Dornan (0-2), D McKibbon (0-1), D O'Hanlon (0-1), K McKernan (0-1), M Poland (0-1), P Devlin (0-1), P Turley (0-1), R Mallon (0-1)	MacHale Park, Castlebar; Attendance: 8,352; Referee: Joe McQuillan (Cavan)

=== Ulster Senior Football Championship ===
The draw for the 2016 Ulster Senior Football Championship took place on 15 October 2015.

==== Fixtures ====
Date	Round	Team 1	Score	Team 2	Ground
Sunday 5 June 2016	Quarter Final	Monaghan	2-22 v 0-09	Down	St Tiernach's Park, Clones

==== Bracket ====
Preliminary round
Fermanagh	1-12
Antrim	0-9

Quarter-finals
Derry	0-12
Tyrone	3-14
Cavan	2-16
Armagh	0-14
Monaghan	2-22
Down	0-09
Donegal	2-12
Fermanagh	0-11

Semi-finals
Tyrone (R)	0-16; 5-18
Cavan (R)	3-07; 2-17
Monaghan (R)	0-14; 2-10
Donegal (R)	1-11; 0-17

Final
Tyrone	0-13
Donegal	0-11

==== Results ====
5 June 2016
14:00
Quarter-Final

Monaghan	2-22 – 0-09	Down
C McManus (0-8), K Hughes (1-2), O Duffy (1-0), R Beggan (0-3), C McCarthy, D McKenna (0-2 each), S Carey, D Clerkin, D Malone, R McAnespie, K O’Connell (0-1 each)	Report	D O'Hare (0-3), C Maginn, D O'Hanlon (0-2 each), B O’Hagan, M Poland (0-1 each)

St Tiernach's Park, Clones
Attendance: 12,782
Referee: Conor Lane (Cork)

=== All-Ireland Senior Football Championship ===
==== Fixtures ====
Date	Round	Team 1	Score	Team 2	Ground
25 June 2016	Round 1B	Down	3-17 v 2-24	Longford	Páirc Esler, Newry

==== Results ====
25 June 2016
2.00 PM
Round 1B

Down	3-17 – 2-24 (AET)	Longford
Donal O'Hare 2-9 (0-8f), Conor Maginn 1-1, Ryan Mallon 0-4, Barry O'Hagan, S Dornan, Mark Poland 0-1 each.	Report	Brian Kavanagh 0-6 (0-5f), Michael Quinn, Robbie Smyth (0-1f) 0-4 each, Seamus Hannon 1-1, James McGivney, Diarmuid Masterson 0-3 each, Mark Hughes 1-0, Barry McKeon 0-2, D Reynolds 0-1.

Pairc Esler, Newry
Referee: Barry Cassidy (Derry)

== Notable events ==
- On Thursday 5 November 2015, Down appointed Éamonn Burns as new football manager.
