= 2016 All-Ireland Senior Football Championship =

Championship details
- Dates: 1 May – 1 October 2016
- Teams: 33

All-Ireland Champions
- Winning team: Dublin (26th win)
- Captain: Stephen Cluxton
- Manager: Jim Gavin

All-Ireland Finalists
- Losing team: Mayo
- Captain: Cillian O'Connor
- Manager: Stephen Rochford

Provincial Champions
- Munster: Kerry
- Leinster: Dublin
- Ulster: Tyrone
- Connacht: Galway

Championship statistics
- No. matches played: 65
- Top Scorer: Dean Rock (1–58)
- Player of the Year: Lee Keegan

The 2016 All-Ireland Senior Football Championship was the 130th edition of the GAA's premier inter-county gaelic football tournament since its establishment in 1887.

33 teams took part. 31 of the 32 Counties of Ireland participated, with Kilkenny, as in previous years, declining to take part. London and New York again competed.

The winning team, Dublin (who defeated Mayo by a single point after a replay), received the Sam Maguire Cup. It was the first time Dublin, as defending champions, had retained the trophy since the 1977 final.

== Format ==
=== Provincial Championships format ===
Connacht, Leinster, Munster and Ulster each organise a provincial championship. All provincial matches are knock-out. All teams eliminated from their provincial championships with the exception of New York, for logistical reasons, enter the All-Ireland qualifiers.

=== Qualifiers format ===
Twenty eight of the twenty nine teams beaten in the provincial championships enter the All-Ireland qualifiers, which are knockout. The sixteen teams eliminated before their provincial semi-finals play eight matches in round 1, with the winners of these games playing the eight beaten provincial semi-finalists in round 2. The eight winning teams from round 2 play-off against each other in round 3, with the four winning teams facing the four beaten provincial finalists in round 4 to complete the double-elimination format. Further details of the format are included with each qualifier round listed below.

=== All-Ireland format ===
The four provincial champions play the four winners of round 4 of the qualifiers in the quarter-finals. Two semi-finals and a final follow. All matches are knock-out. Any game that ends in a draw is replayed. If a replay ends in a draw, extra time is played.

== Changes from 2015 championship ==
Referees were instructed to add on 20 seconds for the introduction of a substitute and 20 seconds for each instance of a goalkeeper or defender going upfield for a placed ball attempt. Previously there was no specific provision for these two events which led to instances of deliberate time-wasting by teams who were leading. 30 seconds were also to be added each time the Hawk-Eye score detection system was utilised.

== Provincial championships ==
=== Connacht Senior Football Championship ===
Preliminary round
New York	0-17
Roscommon	1-15

Quarter-finals
Roscommon	1-21
Leitrim	0-11
London	0-9
Mayo	2-16

Semi-finals
Roscommon	4-16
Sligo	2-13
Mayo	0-12
Galway	1-12

Final
Roscommon (R)	1-10; 0-14
Galway (R)	0-13; 3-16

10 July 2016
14:00
Connacht Final

Galway	0–13 – 1–10	Roscommon
D Cummins (0–3), G Sice, D Comer (0–2 each), G Bradshaw, J Heaney, G O’Donnell, B Power, A Varley (0–1 each)	Report	E Smith (1–0), F Cregg, N Daly, C Murtagh (0–2 each), C Cregg, C Devaney, D O’Malley, D Smith (0–1 each)

Pearse Stadium, Galway
Attendance: 24,324
Referee: Conor Lane (Cork)
17 July 2016
15:30
Connacht Final
Replay

Galway	3–16 – 0–14	Roscommon
D Cummins (2–1), G Sice (1–2), D Comer, S Walsh (0–3 each), E Brannigan (0–2), P Conroy, E Kerin, G O’Donnell, B Power, P Varley (0–1 each)	Report	C Murtagh (0–4), S Kilbride, D Shine, E Smith (0–2 each), T Corcoran, C Cregg, U Harney, F Lennon (0–1 each)

MacHale Park, Castlebar
Attendance: 15,960
Referee: Ciaran Branagan (Down)

=== Leinster Senior Football Championship ===
Preliminary round
Laois	3-16
Wicklow	0-18
Louth	2-24
Carlow	3-11
Longford	2-13
Offaly	2-21

Quarter-finals
Laois	2-10
Dublin	2-21
Louth	1-13
Meath	0-20
Offaly	0-12
Westmeath	0-13
Wexford	0-8
Kildare	0-9

Semi-finals
Dublin	0-21
Meath	0-11
Westmeath	1-12
Kildare	1-11

Final
Dublin	2-19
Westmeath	0-10

17 July 2016
16:00
Leinster Final

Dublin	2–19 – 0–10	Westmeath
D Rock (0–8), B Brogan (1–4), K McManamon (1–2), P Andrews (0–2), D Connolly, P Flynn, J Small (0–1 each)	Report	J Heslin (0–6), G Egan (0–2), D Corroon, C McCormack (0–1 each)

Croke Park, Dublin
Attendance: 47,840
Referee: Fergal Kelly (Longford)

=== Munster Senior Football Championship ===
Quarter-finals
Clare	0-16
Limerick	0-13
Waterford	1-07
Tipperary	1-15

Semi-finals
Clare	0-17
Kerry	2-23
Cork	2-16
Tipperary	3-15

Final
Kerry	3-17
Tipperary	2-10

3 July 2016
14:00
Munster Final

Kerry	3–17 – 2–10	Tipperary
P Geaney (2–3), P Murphy (1–1), James O’Donoghue, B Sheehan (0–4 each), M Geaney, BJ Keane, S O’Brien, D O’Sullivan, K Young (0–1 each)	Report	K O’Halloran (0–6), J Feehan, R Kiely (1–0 each), M Quinlivan (0–3), A Moloney (0–1)

Fitzgerald Stadium, Killarney
Attendance: 21,512
Referee: David Gough (Meath)

=== Ulster Senior Football Championship ===
Preliminary round
Fermanagh	1-12
Antrim	0-9

Quarter-finals
Derry	0-12
Tyrone	3-14
Cavan	2-16
Armagh	0-14
Monaghan	2-22
Down	0-09
Donegal	2-12
Fermanagh	0-11

Semi-finals
Tyrone (R)	0-16; 5-18
Cavan (R)	3-07; 2-17
Monaghan (R)	0-14; 2-10
Donegal (R)	1-11; 0-17

Final
Tyrone	0-13
Donegal	0-11

17 July 2016
14:00
Ulster Final

Tyrone	0–13 – 0–11	Donegal
S Cavanagh (0–3), P Harte, N Morgan (0–2 each), R Brennan, C McCarron, D McCurry, C McGeary, C McShane, N Sludden (0–1 each)	Report	P McBrearty, R McHugh (0–3 each), O MacNiallais, M Murphy (0–2 each), C Toye (0–1)

St. Tiernach's Park, Clones
Attendance: 33,433
Referee: David Coldrick (Meath)

== All-Ireland Series ==
=== Qualifiers ===
==== A and B teams ====
An A and B system for the qualifier draws was introduced in 2014 and was retained. The teams were designated as A or B depending on which half of their provincial championships they played in. Although some teams receive byes in the early provincial rounds, their position in the round in which they entered the competition was usually determined by the provincial draw, resulting in most teams being designated as A or B randomly. For example, each of the four provinces had two semi-finals – one between two teams designated A and one between two teams designated B. The beaten semi-finalists in each province were always one A team and one B team.

In all qualifier rounds A teams played A teams and B teams played B teams. Usually the A teams played their provincial games before the B teams, which allowed the A qualifier games to be scheduled a week before the B qualifier games.

==== Round 1 ====
In the first round of the qualifiers sixteen of the seventeen teams beaten in the preliminary rounds or quarter-finals of the provincial championships competed. New York did not enter the qualifiers. Four A teams played four A teams, while four B teams played four B teams. The round 1 draw was unrestricted − if two teams had played each other in a provincial match they could be drawn to meet again, with the winner of the provincial match receiving home advantage. The eight round 1 winners played the eight beaten provincial semi-finalists in round 2 of the qualifiers.

The following teams were entered into round 1.

Connacht (2)

Leitrim (A)
London (B)

Leinster (7)

Carlow (A)
Laois (A)
Louth (A)
Wicklow (A)
Longford (B)
Offaly (B)
Wexford (B)

Munster (2)

Waterford (A)
Limerick (B)

Ulster (5)

Armagh (A)
Derry (A)
Antrim (B)
Down (B)
Fermanagh (B)

18 June 2016
3.30 PM
Round 1A

Laois	1–10 – 0–10 Match declared void*	Armagh
D Kingston 0–4 (0–3 fs), C Meredith 1–0, P Cahillane (f), D Conway (f), D Strong, G Walsh (f), J Farrell, R Munnelly 0–1.	Report	S Campbell 0–3 (0–3 fs), R Grugan 0–2 (0–1 f), M McKenna 0–2, A Forker, M Shields, J Feeney 0–1.

O'Moore Park, Portlaoise
Referee: A. Nolan (Wicklow)

*During the match Laois made seven substitutions, one more than the permitted six. On 21 June 2016 the CCCC declared the match void and scheduled a replay for 2 July.

18 June 2016
5.00 PM
Round 1A

Derry	1–18 – 2–10	Louth
J Kielt 1–9 (6f, 1 pen), C Bradley 0–3 (1f), E McGuckin 0–2, M Lynch (0–2, 2f), N Toner 0–1, E Bradley 0–1	Report	D Byrne 1–3, J McEneaney 1–1 (pen), J Califf 0–4 (4f), R Burns 0–1 (f), C Grimes 0–1

Owenbeg, Dungiven
Attendance: 1,632
Referee: M. Duffy (Sligo)

18 June 2016
7.00 PM
Round 1A

Carlow	1–17 – 1–12	Wicklow
D Foley 0–8 (5f), B Murphy 1–4, D St Ledger 0–3 (3f), C Blake, G Power 0–1.	Report	P Cunningham 1–6 (4f), D Hayden, M Kenny 0–2; R Finn, A Murphy 0–1.

Dr. Cullen Park, Carlow
Attendance: 2,000
Referee: P. O'Sullivan (Kerry)

19 June 2016
2.00 PM
Round 1A

Leitrim	0–12 – 0–08	Waterford
Mulligan (0–3, 2f), C Gilheaney (0–1), R Kennedy (0–7, 2f, 1’45), D Wrynn (0–1),	Report	G Crotty (0–1), P Hurney (0–1, 1f), M O’Halloran, J Veale, L Lawlor (0–2), M Ferncombe (0–3, 3f)

Páirc Seán Mac Diarmada, Carrick-on-Shannon
Referee: N. Mooney (Cavan)

2 July 2016
3.00 PM
Round 1A Replay

Laois	1–11 – 1–10	Armagh
C Meredith 1–0; D Conway, R Munnelly (1f), J O’Loughlin 0–2 each; P Cahillane (f), N Donoher, D Strong, D Kingston (f), G Walsh (f) 0–1 each.	Report	R Grugan 1–2; S Campbell 0–4(3fs); C Watters 0–2; M McKenna, B Donaghy 0–1 each.

O'Moore Park, Portlaoise
Referee: Padraig O’Sullivan (Kerry)

25 June 2016
2.00 PM
Round 1B

Down	3–17 – 2–24 (a.e.t.)	Longford
Donal O’Hare 2–9 (0-8f), Conor Maginn 1–1, Ryan Mallon 0–4, Barry O’Hagan, S Dornan, Mark Poland 0–1 each.	Report	Brian Kavanagh 0–6 (0-5f), Michael Quinn, Robbie Smyth (0-1f) 0–4 each, Seamus Hannon 1–1, James McGivney, Diarmuid Masterson 0–3 each, Mark Hughes 1–0, Barry McKeon 0–2, D Reynolds 0–1.

Páirc Esler, Newry
Referee: Barry Cassidy (Derry)

25 June 2016
2.00 PM
Round 1B

Antrim	0–09 – 2–06	Limerick
R Murray 0–2 (2f), P McBride 0–2, K Niblock 0–2 (1f), M Fitzpatrick, S Burke, T McCann (1f) 0–1.	Report	S McSweeney 1–3 (1–0 pen, 3fs), I Ryan 1–2 (1f), S Cahill 0–1.

Corrigan Park, Belfast
Referee: Sean Hurson (Tyrone)

25 June 2016
2.00 PM
Round 1B

Offaly	0–17 – 1–07	London
N Dunne 0–7 (0-4f), N McNamee 0–4, B Allen 0–3 (0-2f), A Sullivan, N Bracken & N Darby 0–1 each.	Report	P O’Hara 1–1, M Gottsche (f), L Gavaghan, A Moyles (f), S Conroy (f), E Mageean & D Molloy 0–1 each.

O'Connor Park, Tullamore
Attendance: 500 est.
Referee: David Coldrick (Meath)

25 June 2016
5.00 PM
Round 1B

Wexford	1–11 – 0–19	Fermanagh
S Donohoe 1–0; D Shanley 0–4 frees; J Tubritt 0–3; B Brosnan 0–2; K O’Grady, S Roche 0–1 each.	Report	T Corrigan (5f) 0–9; S Quigley (2f) 0–4; A Breen, E Donnelly 0–2 each; B Mulrone, R Corrigan 0–1 each.

Wexford Park, Wexford
Referee: Eddie Kinsella (Laois)

==== Round 2 ====
In the second round of the qualifiers the eight winning teams from Round 1A and Round 1B played the eight beaten provincial semi-finalists. The round 2 draw was unrestricted − if two teams had played each other in a provincial match they could be drawn to meet again, with the winner of the provincial match receiving home advantage. The eight winners of these matches played each other in Round 3.

The following teams took part in this round –

Round 1A
Winners (4)

Carlow
Derry
Laois
Leitrim

Beaten Provincial
Semi-finalists – A

Cavan
Clare
Meath
Sligo

Round 1B
Winners (4)

Fermanagh
Limerick
Longford
Offaly

Beaten Provincial
Semi-finalists – B

Cork
Kildare
Mayo
Monaghan

2 July 2016
6.00 PM
Round 2A

Sligo	2–15 – 0–10	Leitrim
N Murphy 0–5, M Breheny 0–4 (2f), K Cawley &, D Cummins 1–0 each, A Marren 0–3 (1f, 1’45), J Hynes, K O’Donnell & B Egan 0–1 each	Report	E Mulligan 0–4 (4f), N O’Donnell 0–2, D Wrynn, R Kennedy (f), D Sweeney & C Gaffney 0–1 each.

Markievicz Park, Sligo
Attendance: 4,227
Referee: Sean Hurson (Tyrone)

9 July 2016
2.30 PM
Round 2A

Derry	1–14 – 1–11	Meath
M Lynch 0–6 (2f), J Kielt 0–4 (3f), N Loughlin (1–0), C McKaigue, E Lynn, C Bradley, E Brown 0–1 each	Report	M Newman 1–4 (3f), G Reilly 0–2, C O'Sullivan 0–2 (2f), M Burke, P Harnan 0–1 each, A Tormey 0–1 (f)

Owenbeg, Dungiven
Referee: Paddy Neilan (Roscommon)

9 July 2016
5.00 PM
Round 2A

Cavan	2–13 – 0–12	Carlow
G McKiernan (0–5, 1f); E Keating (1–1); C Mackey (1–1); S Johnston (0–3, 3f); D McVeety (0–1); T Corr (0–1); T Hayes (0–1).	Report	D St. Ledger (0–5,4f, ‘45); D Foley (0–2, 2f); E Ruth (0–1); D O’Brien (0–1); C Blake (0–1, 1f); J Murphy (0–1); A Kelly (0–1).

Breffni Park, Cavan
Referee: F Kelly (Longford)

10 July 2016
2.00 PM
Round 2A

Clare	0–14 – 1–10	Laois
E Cleary 0–4 (0-4f), J Malone 0–3, G Brennan 0–1 (0-1f), C O’Connor 0–1, K Sexton 0–1, D Tubridy 0–1 (0-1f), S Hickey 0–1, S Malone 0–1, S McGrath 0–1.	Report	J O’Loughlin 0–3, D Kingston 0–3 (0-2f), S Attride 1–0, C Meredith 0–1, D Conway 0–1, D Strong 0–1, P Cahillane 0–1 (0-1f).

Cusack Park, Ennis
Referee: Marty Duffy (Sligo)

9 July 2016
3.00 PM
Round 2B

Limerick	0–10 – 2–12	Cork
I Ryan 0–4 (3f), D Treacy & I Corbett 0–2 each, S McSweeney (f) & S Buckley 0–1 each.	Report	P Kerrigan 1–3, M Collins 0–5, P Kelleher 1–0, C O’Neill (f), L Connolly (f), J O’Rourke & M Hurley 0–1 each.

Semple Stadium, Thurles
Attendance: 15,540
Referee: N Mooney (Cavan)

9 July 2016
3.30 PM
Round 2B

Mayo	2–14 – 1–12	Fermanagh
L Keegan (0-02), C Boyle (0-01), A O’Shea (0-01), D O’Connor (0-02), E Regan (0-01, 0-01f), A Freeman (1-00), C O’Connor (1-05, 1–00 pen, 0-03f, 0-01 ’45).	Report	Breen (0-03), E Donnelly (0-01), B Mulrone (0-02), R Lyons (0-01), S Quigley (1-01, 0-01f), T Corrigan (0-04, 0-02f).

McHale Park, Castlebar
Referee: Joe McQuillan (Cavan)

9 July 2016
6.30 PM
Round 2B

Monaghan	1–13 – 2–13	Longford
C McCarthy 0–4, C McManus 0–4 (3f), C Walshe 1–0, J McCarron 0–2, R Beggan 0–1 (1f), R McAnespie 0–1, S Carey 0–1.	Report	R Smyth 1–3 (2f), D Masterson 0–3, J McGivney 0–3, B Kavanagh 0–3 (1f, 1 s-l), M Quinn 1–0, L Connerton 0–1.

St Tiernach's Park, Clones
Referee: C Branagan (Down)

9 July 2016
6.30 PM
Round 2B

Kildare	1–22 – 2–14	Offaly
N Flynn 0–5 (0-2f); N Kelly, A Tyrrell (0-2f) 0–4 each; T Moolick 1–1; E O’Flaherty (0-2f), F Conway 0–2 each; C McNally, K Feely, A Smith, D Hyland 0–1 each.	Report	N Dunne 1–7 (0-7f); P Cunningham 1–1 (1–0 pen); J Moloney, N Darby (0-1f) 0–2 each; N McNamee, G Guilfoyle 0–1 each.

St Conleth's Park, Newbridge
Referee: Padraig Hughes (Armagh)

==== Round 3 ====
In the third round of the qualifiers winning teams from round 2A played against winning teams from round 2A, while winning teams from round 2B played against winning teams from round 2B. Round 3 rules did not allow two teams that had played each other in a provincial match to meet again. The four winners of these matches played the four beaten provincial finalists in Round 4.

The following teams took part in this round –

Round 2A Winners (4)

Cavan
Clare
Derry
Sligo

Round 2B Winners (4)

Cork
Kildare
Longford
Mayo

16 July 2016
2:00 pm
Round 3A

Sligo	1–13 – 2–17	Clare
A. Marren (0–3, 2f); M. Breheny (0–3, 2f); P. Hughes (1–0); N. Murphy (0–3, 1f); Brian Egan (0–1); Kyle Cawley (0–1); A. McIntyre (0–1); C. Henry (0–1)	Report	D. Tubridy (1–3, 2f, 1–0 pen); E. Cleary (0–5, 2f); C. O’Connor (0–4); K. Sexton (0–3); G. Brennan (1–0); P. Lillis (0–1); S. McGrath (0–1)

Markievicz Park, Sligo
Referee: Anthony Nolan (Wicklow)

16 July 2016
3:30 pm
Round 3A

Cavan	0–18 – 1–17	Derry
G McKiernan (0–4, 3f), R Galligan (0–3, 3f), D McVeety (0–3), M Reilly (0–2), C Moynagh (0–1), M Argue (0–1), C Mackey (0–1), J Brady (0–1), S Johnston (0–1, 1f), G Smith (0–1).	Report	M Lynch (0–7, 4f), E McGuckin (1–0), C McAtamney (0–1), D Heavron (0–1), C Bradley (0–1), J Kielt (0–1), E Lynn (0–1), N Loughlin (0–1, ‘45)

Breffni Park, Cavan
Referee: Eddie Kinsella (Laois)

16 July 2016
7:00 pm
Round 3B

Mayo	2–17 – 0–14	Kildare
D O'Connor 1–5, E Regan 1–4 (0-1f), C O'Connor (2fs) J Doherty 0–2 each, K Higgins, P Durcan, A Freeman, C O'Shea 0–1 each.	Report	N Flynn 0–5 (2fs, 1 45), F Dowling 0–3, M O'Flaherty 0–2, J Byrne, C McNally, A Smith (f), K Cribbin all 0–1 each.

McHale Park, Castlebar
Attendance: 14,557
Referee: Derek O Mahoney (Tipperary)

16 July 2016
3:00 pm
Round 3B

Longford	1–06 – 2–09	Cork
Brian Kavanagh 1–1 (1–0 pen), Michael Quinn, Diarmuid Masterson, Barry McKeon (0-1f), James McGivney, Robbie Smyth 0–1 each.	Report	Colm O’Neill 1–1, Ian Maguire 1–0, Mark Collins, Paul Kerrigan 0–2 each, James Loughrey, JohnO ‘Rourke, Michael Hurley, Patrick Kelly 0–1 each.

Pearse Park, Longford
Attendance: 3,567
Referee: Barry Cassidy (Derry)

==== Round 4 ====
In the fourth round of the qualifiers, the four winning teams of Round 3A and Round 3B played the four beaten provincial finalists. Round 4 rules did not allow two teams that had played each other in a provincial match to meet again if such a pairing could be avoided. The four winners of these matches played the provincial champions in the All-Ireland Quarter-finals.

The following teams took part in this round –

Round 3A
Winners

Clare
Derry

Beaten Provincial
Finalists – A

Roscommon
Tipperary

Round 3B
Winners

Cork
Mayo

Beaten Provincial
Finalists – B

Donegal
Westmeath

23 July 2016; 3.00 PM; Round 4A	Clare	2–12 – 1–09	Roscommon	Pearse Stadium; Attendance: 4,100; Referee: P Hughes (Armagh)
23 July 2016; 3.00 PM; Round 4A	E Cleary (0–6, 2 frees); D Tubridy (1–2, 0–1 free); J Malone (1–0); D Ryan, G Brennan, S McGrath and S Malone (all 0–1).	Report	E Smith (1–1); C Murtagh (0–3 frees); S Mullooly and C Devaney (both 0–1); N Kilroy, D Shine and D Murtagh (all 0–1 frees).	Pearse Stadium; Attendance: 4,100; Referee: P Hughes (Armagh)

23 July 2016; 5.00 PM; Round 4A	Derry	2–17 – 1–21	Tipperary	Breffni Park; Attendance: 2,795; Referee: M. Duffy (Sligo)
23 July 2016; 5.00 PM; Round 4A	M. Lynch (1–4, 0–3 frees); D. Heavron (0–4); N. Loughlin (0–3); E. Brown (1–0); J. Kielt (0–2, 1 free); E. Lynn, E. Bradley, L. McGoldrick, C. Bradley (0–1 each).	Report	K. O’Halloran (1–5, 0–4 frees, 0–1 45); M. Quinlivan (0–6, 4 frees); C. Sweeney (0–5); J. Keane (0–2); P. Austin, P. Acheson, B. Maher (0–1 each).	Breffni Park; Attendance: 2,795; Referee: M. Duffy (Sligo)

30 July 2016; 4.00 PM; Round 4B	Cork	1–15 – 0–21	Donegal	Croke Park; Attendance: 27,615; Referee: Paddy Neilan (Roscommon)
30 July 2016; 4.00 PM; Round 4B	Paul Kerrigan 1–1, Colm O’Driscoll, Tom Clancy (Clonakilty), Kevin O’Driscoll, Colm O’Neill (0-1f), Donncha O’Connor 0–2 each, Mark Collins, Tomás Clancy (Fermoy), Seán Powter, Aidan Walsh 0–1 each	Report	Patrick McBrearty 0–11 (0-4f), Ryan McHugh 0–3, Eoin McHugh, Michael Murphy (0-1f) 0–2 each, Karl Lacey, Frank McGlynn, Odhrán MacNiallais 0–1 each.	Croke Park; Attendance: 27,615; Referee: Paddy Neilan (Roscommon)

30 July 2016; 6.00 PM; Round 4B	Mayo	3–15 – 1–14	Westmeath	Croke Park; Attendance: 27,615; Referee: R Hickey (Clare); Man of the Match: Donal Vaughan (Ballinrobe)
30 July 2016; 6.00 PM; Round 4B	Cillian O’Connor (1–5, 0–2 frees), Jason Doherty (1–1), Aidan O’Shea (1–0), Evan Regan 0–3 (0-2f), Andy Moran (0–2), Keith Higgins, Patrick Durcan, Donal Vaughan and Kevin McLoughlin 0–1 each	Report	John Heslin (0–10, 0–7 frees); Kieran Martin (0–2); James Dolan (1–1); Frank Boyle (0–1)	Croke Park; Attendance: 27,615; Referee: R Hickey (Clare); Man of the Match: Donal Vaughan (Ballinrobe)

Quarter-finals
6 August, Croke Park
Tyrone	0-12
Mayo	0-13
31 July, Croke Park
Galway	1–10
Tipperary	3–13
6 August, Croke Park
Dublin	1–15
Donegal	1–10
31 July, Croke Park
Kerry	2–16
Clare	0–11

Semi-finals
21 August, Croke Park
Mayo	2-13
Tipperary	0-14
28 August, Croke Park
Dublin	0–22
Kerry	2–14

Final
18 September & 1 October; Croke Park
Mayo (R)	0-15; 1-14
Dublin (R)	2-9; 1-15

=== Quarter-finals ===
The four provincial champions played the winners from Round 4 of the qualifiers. Draw rules – 1) Two teams who met in a provincial final could not meet again 2) If one of the provincial champions had already met one of the qualifiers in an earlier match then those two teams could not be drawn together if such a pairing could be avoided.

31 July; 2.00 PM	Kerry	2–16 – 0–11	Clare	Croke Park, Dublin; Attendance: 29,251; Referee: Maurice Deegan (Laois)
31 July; 2.00 PM	D O'Sullivan 1–2, J O'Donoghue 0–5 (3fs), BJ Keane 0–3, P Geaney 0–3 (0-1f), D Walsh 1–1, B Sheehan 0–1 (0-1f), S O'Brien 0–1		D Tubridy 0–4 (2fs, 145), E Cleary 0–4 (4fs), P Lillis 0–1, J Malone 0–1, P Burke 0–1	Croke Park, Dublin; Attendance: 29,251; Referee: Maurice Deegan (Laois)

31 July; 4.00 PM	Galway	1–10 – 3–13	Tipperary	Croke Park, Dublin; Attendance: 29,251; Referee: Conor Lane (Cork); Man of the Match: Michael Quinlivan (Clonmel Commercials)
31 July; 4.00 PM	S Walsh 0–4 (4fs), D Comer 1–0, D Cummins 0–3, E Brannigan 0–1, P Conroy 0–1, P Varley 0–1	Report	C Sweeney 2–2, M Quinlivan 1–4 (1f), K O'Halloran 0–4 (2fs, 145), B Fox 0–1, R Kiely 0–1, P Acheson 0–1	Croke Park, Dublin; Attendance: 29,251; Referee: Conor Lane (Cork); Man of the Match: Michael Quinlivan (Clonmel Commercials)

6 August; 4.00 PM	Tyrone	0–12 – 0–13	Mayo	Croke Park, Dublin; Referee: David Gough (Meath); Man of the Match: Lee Keegan (Westport)
6 August; 4.00 PM	P Harte (0–4, 2f), M Donnelly (0–3), C McAliskey (0–2, 2f) R O'Neill (0–1, 1f), N Sludden (0–1), D McCurry (0–1)	Report	C O'Connor (0–7, 4f), L Keegan (0–2), C Boyle, A Moran, A O'Shea, T Parsons (0–1 each)	Croke Park, Dublin; Referee: David Gough (Meath); Man of the Match: Lee Keegan (Westport)

6 August; 6.00 PM	Dublin	1–15 – 1–10	Donegal	Croke Park, Dublin; Referee: C Branagan (Down); Man of the Match: Ciarán Kilkenny (Castleknock)
6 August; 6.00 PM	D Rock (0-5f), P Mannion (1–1), D Connolly, K McManamon, P McMahon (0–2 each), P Andrews, C Kilkenny, J Cooper (0–1 each)	Report	M Murphy (0–6 5f, 1 45), R McHugh (1–0), P McBrearty (0–3, 2f), A Thompson (0–1)	Croke Park, Dublin; Referee: C Branagan (Down); Man of the Match: Ciarán Kilkenny (Castleknock)

=== Semi-finals ===
There was no draw for the semi-finals as the fixtures were pre-determined on a three yearly rotation. This rotation ensured that a province's champions played the champions of all the other provinces once every three years in the semi-finals if they each won their quarter-finals and prevented two provincial champions meeting in the semi-finals in successive years. If a qualifier team defeated a provincial winner in a quarter-final, the qualifier team took that provincial winner's place in the semi-final.

21 August; 3:30 pm	Mayo	2–13 – 0–14	Tipperary	Croke Park, Dublin; Attendance: 53,212; Referee: David Coldrick (Meath); Man of the Match: Keith Higgins (Ballyhaunis)
21 August; 3:30 pm	Andy Moran 0–4, Jason Doherty and Conor O’Shea 1–0 each, Cillian O’Connor 0-3f, Diarmuid O’Connor 0–2, Lee Keegan, Colm Boyle, Kevin McLoughlin, Aidan O’Shea 0–1 each	Report	Michael Quinlivan 0-7f, Conor Sweeney 0–3 (0-1f), Kevin O’Halloran 0–2 (0-1f), Bill Maher and Philip Austin 0–1 each	Croke Park, Dublin; Attendance: 53,212; Referee: David Coldrick (Meath); Man of the Match: Keith Higgins (Ballyhaunis)

28 August; 3:30 pm	Dublin	0–22 – 2–14	Kerry	Croke Park; Referee: David Gough (Meath)
28 August; 3:30 pm	Dean Rock 0–12 (8f, 2 ’45), Diarmuid Connolly 0–3, Kevin McManamon 0–2, Bernard Brogan 0–2, Philly McMahon 0–1, Eoghan O’Gara 0–1, Brian Fenton 0–1.	Report	Paul Geaney 1–4, Colm Cooper 0–5 (4f), Darran O’Sullivan 1–0, David Moran 0–1, Stephen O’Brien 0–1, Paul Murphy 0–1, James O’Donoghue 0–1, Barry John Keane 0–1.	Croke Park; Referee: David Gough (Meath)

=== Final ===
18 September; 3:30 pm Final	Mayo	0–15 – 2–09	Dublin	Croke Park, Dublin; Attendance: 82,257; Referee: Conor Lane (Cork); Man of the Match: John Small (Ballymun Kickhams)
18 September; 3:30 pm Final	Cillian O'Connor (0–7 5f), Donal Voughan, Andy Moran (0–2 each), Patrick Durcan, Tom Parsons, Alan Dillon, Jason Doherty (0–1)	Report	Dean Rock (0–4 3f), Paddy Andrews (0–2), John Small, Brian Fenton, Diarmuid Connolly (0–1 each) (Kevin McLoughlin, Colm Boyle 1–0 own goal each)	Croke Park, Dublin; Attendance: 82,257; Referee: Conor Lane (Cork); Man of the Match: John Small (Ballymun Kickhams)

=== Final Replay ===
1 October; 5:00 pm Replay	Mayo	1–14 – 1–15	Dublin	Croke Park, Dublin; Attendance: 82,249; Referee: Maurice Deegan (Laois); Man of the Match: Michael Fitzsimons (Cuala)
1 October; 5:00 pm Replay	Cillian O'Connor 0–9 (0-9f), Lee Keegan 1–0, Patrick Durcan 0–2, Kevin Mcloughlin, Andy Moran, Diarmuid O'Connor 0–1 each	Report	Dean Rock 0–9 (0-7f), Diarmuid Connolly 1–1 (1–0 pen), Cormac Costello 0–3, Kevin McManamon, Bernard Brogan 0–1 each	Croke Park, Dublin; Attendance: 82,249; Referee: Maurice Deegan (Laois); Man of the Match: Michael Fitzsimons (Cuala)

== Stadia and locations ==
2016 All-Ireland Senior Football Championship (island of Ireland)

Antrim	Armagh	Carlow	Cavan	Clare
Corrigan Park	Athletic Grounds	Dr Cullen Park	Breffni Park	Cusack Park
Belfast	Armagh	Carlow	Cavan	Ennis
Capacity: 5,500	Capacity: 19,500	Capacity: 21,000	Capacity: 32,000	Capacity: 14,864
Cork	Derry	Donegal	Down	Dublin
Páirc Uí Chaoimh	Celtic Park	MacCumhaill Park	Páirc Esler	Croke Park
Cork	Derry	Ballybofey	Newry	Dublin
Capacity: 43,550	Capacity: 22,000	Capacity: 18,000	Capacity: 20,000	Capacity: 82,500
Páirc Uí Choaimh 2014 Cork vs Kerry				View from the Hill in Croke Park
Fermanagh	Galway	Kerry	Kildare	Laois
Brewster Park	Pearse Stadium	Fitzgerald Stadium	St Conleth's Park	O'Moore Park
Enniskillen	Galway	Killarney	Newbridge	Portlaoise
Capacity: 20,000	Capacity: 26,197	Capacity: 43,180	Capacity: 6,200	Capacity: 27,000
Leitrim	Limerick	London	Longford	Louth
Páirc Seán Mac Diarmada	Gaelic Grounds	Emerald GAA Grounds	Pearse Park	Drogheda Park
Carrick-on-Shannon	Limerick	Ruislip	Longford	Drogheda
Capacity: 9,331	Capacity: 49,866	Capacity: 5,000	Capacity: 10,000	Capacity: 7,000
Mayo	Meath	Monaghan	New York	Offaly
MacHale Park	Páirc Tailteann	St Tiernach's Park	Gaelic Park	O'Connor Park
Castlebar	Navan	Clones	New York City	Tullamore
Capacity: 42,000	Capacity: 10,000	Capacity: 36,000	Capacity: 2,000	Capacity: 20,000
Roscommon	Sligo	Tipperary	Tyrone	Waterford
Dr Hyde Park	Markievicz Park	Semple Stadium	Healy Park	Walsh Park
Roscommon	Sligo	Thurles	Omagh	Waterford
Capacity: 18,500	Capacity: 18,558	Capacity: 53,500	Capacity: 26,500	Capacity: 17,000
Westmeath	Wexford	Wicklow		
Cusack Park (Mullingar)	Wexford Park	Aughrim County Ground		
Mullingar	Wexford	Aughrim		
Capacity: 11,000	Capacity: 20,000	Capacity: 10,000		

== Referees Panel ==
As announced in April 2016:

This was a first year in the SFC for Noel Mooney (Cavan).

Championship Panel
Name	County	Club	Matches refereed
BRANAGAN, Ciarán	Down		
CASSIDY, Barry	Derry	Bellaghy	
COLDRICK, David	Meath	Blackhall Gaels	
DEEGAN, Maurice	Laois	Stradbally	
DUFFY, Martin	Sligo	Kilgass	
GOUGH, David	Meath	Slane	
HICKEY, Rory	Clare		
HUGHES, Pádraig	Armagh		
HURSON, Sean	Tyrone	Galbally Pearses	
KELLY, Fergal	Longford		
KINSELLA, Eddie	Laois	Courtwood	
LANE, Conor	Cork	Banteer	
MCQUILLAN, Joe	Cavan	Kill Shamrocks	
MOONEY, Noel	Cavan		
NEILAN, Paddy	Roscommon	St Faithleach's	
NOLAN, Annthony	Wicklow		
O'MAHONEY, Derek	Tipperary		
O'SULLIVAN, Padraig	Kerry		

Linesman Panel (newly created)

1. James Bermingham (Cork)
2. Niall Cullen (Fermanagh)
3. Liam Devenney (Mayo)
4. Jerome Henry (Mayo)
5. John Hickey (Carlow)
6. Shaun McLaughlin (Donegal)
7. Martin McNally (Monaghan)
8. Cormac Reilly (Meath)

== Statistics ==
- All scores correct as of 1 October 2016

=== Top scorer overall ===
Rank	Player	County	Tally	Total	Matches	Average
1	Dean Rock	Dublin	1–58	61	7	8.7
2	Cillian O'Connor	Mayo	2–44	50	8	6.3
3	Michael Quinlivan	Tipperary	2–27	33	6	5.5
4	Patrick McBrearty	Donegal	0–29	29	6	4.8
4	Tomás Corrigan	Fermanagh	0–29	29	4	7.2
6	Conor McManus	Monaghan	1–24	27	4	6.8
6	Kevin O'Halloran	Tipperary	1–24	27	5	5.4
8	David Tubridy	Clare	2–20	26	6	4.3
8	Ciarán Murtagh	Roscommon	3–17	26	6	4.3
10	John Heslin	Westmeath	0–25	25	4	6.2
11	Eoin Cleary	Clare	0–24	24	6	4
11	James Kielt	Derry	1–21	24	5	4.8
13	Nigel Dunne	Offaly	1–20	23	3	7.7
14	Mark Lynch	Derry	1–19	22	4	5.5
15	Robbie Smyth	Longford	2–14	20	4	5

=== Top scorer in a single game ===
Rank	Player	County	Tally	Total	Opposition
1	Donal O'Hare	Down	2-09	15	Longford
2	Dean Rock	Dublin	1–10	13	Laois
3	Dean Rock	Dublin	0–12	12	Kerry
3	James Kielt	Derry	1-09	12	Louth
5	Patrick McBrearty	Donegal	0–11	11	Cork
6	Dean Rock	Dublin	0–10	10	Meath
6	John Heslin	Westmeath	0–10	10	Mayo
6	Ryan Burns	Louth	1-07	10	Carlow
6	Nigel Dunne	Offaly	1-07	10	Kildare
6	Peter Harte	Tyrone	2-04	10	Cavan
11	Dean Rock	Dublin	0-09	9	Mayo
11	Cillian O'Connor	Mayo	0-09	9	Dublin
11	Tomás Corrigan	Fermanagh	0-09	9	Antrim
11	Tomás Corrigan	Fermanagh	0-09	9	Wexford
11	Donal Kingston	Laois	1-06	9	Wicklow
11	Paul Cunningham	Wicklow	1-06	9	Carlow
11	Paul Geaney	Kerry	2-03	9	Tipperary

=== Miscellaneous ===
- Tipperary beat Cork for the first time since 1944.
- Kerry were the first team since Cork (1987–1990) to win a 4th Munster title in a row.
- In the old system All Ireland series we would have had a Galway vs Tyrone All Ireland semi-final.
- The All-Ireland final ends in a draw and goes to a replay for the first time since 2000.

=== Scoring events ===
Widest winning margin: 19

- Monaghan 2–22 – 0–9 Down (Ulster SFC quarter-final)

Most goals in a match: 7

- Tyrone 5–18 – 2–17 Cavan (Ulster SFC semi-final replay)

Most points in a match: 41

- Down 3–17 – 2–24 Longford (Round 1B qualifier – A.E.T.)

Most goals by one team in a match: 5

- Tyrone 5–18 – 2–17 Cavan (Ulster SFC semi-final replay)

Highest aggregate score: 56 points

- Down 3–17 – 2–24 Longford (Round 1B qualifier – A.E.T.)
- Tyrone 5–18 – 2–17 Cavan (Ulster SFC semi-final replay)

Lowest aggregate score: 17 points

- Wexford 0-08 – 0-09 Kildare (Leinster SFC quarter-final)

== Broadcast rights ==
RTÉ, the national broadcaster in Ireland, provided the majority of the live television coverage of the championship in the third year of a deal running from 2014 until 2016. A number of matches were also broadcast by Sky Sports, with Sky having exclusive rights to some games.

=== Live broadcast matches ===
The broadcast schedule for matches shown live on television in Ireland follows –

Broadcast Schedule
Date	Teams & Match Details	RTÉ Sky Sports
Provincial and Qualifier Matches
22 May	Derry v Tyrone; Ulster Quarter-final	RTÉ
29 May	Cavan v Armagh; Ulster Quarter-final	RTÉ
4 June	Laois v Dublin; Leinster Quarter-final	Sky Sports
5 June	Monaghan v Down; Ulster Quarter-final	RTÉ
12 June	Roscommon v Sligo; Connacht Semi-final	RTÉ
12 June	Donegal v Fermanagh; Ulster Quarter-final	RTÉ
18 June	Laois v Armagh; Qualifier Round 1A	RTÉ
18 June	Mayo v Galway; Connacht Semi-final	Sky Sports
19 June	Tyrone v Cavan; Ulster Semi-final	RTÉ
25 June	Monaghan v Donegal; Ulster Semi-final	Sky Sports
26 June	Westmeath v Kildare; Leinster Semi-final	RTÉ
26 June	Dublin v Meath; Leinster Semi-final	RTÉ
3 July	Kerry v Tipperary; Munster Final	RTÉ
9 July	Mayo v Fermanagh; Qualifier Round 2B	RTÉ
10 July	Galway v Roscommon; Connacht Final	RTÉ
16 July	Mayo v Kildare; Qualifier Round 3B	Sky Sports
17 July	Dublin v Westmeath; Leinster Final	RTÉ
17 July	Tyrone v Donegal; Ulster Final	RTÉ; BBC NI
23 July	Clare v Roscommon; Qualifier Round 4A	Sky Sports
23 July	Derry v Tipperary; Qualifier Round 4A	Sky Sports
30 July	Cork v Donegal; Qualifier Round 4B	Sky Sports
30 July	Mayo v Westmeath; Qualifier Round 4B	Sky Sports
All-Ireland Quarter-finals
31 July	Galway v Tipperary	RTÉ
31 July	Kerry v Clare	RTÉ
6 August	Tyrone v Mayo	Sky Sports
6 August	Dublin v Donegal	Sky Sports
All-Ireland Semi-finals
21 August	Mayo v Tipperary	RTÉ; Sky Sports
28 August	Dublin v Kerry	RTÉ; Sky Sports
All-Ireland Final
18 September	Mayo v Dublin	RTÉ; Sky Sports
1 October	Replay; Mayo v Dublin	RTÉ; Sky Sports

== Awards ==
The Sunday Game Team of the Year

The Sunday Game team of the year was picked on 1 October, the night of the final replay. Dublin's Brian Fenton was named as The Sunday Game player of the year.

1. Stephen Cluxton (Dublin)
2. Brendan Harrison (Mayo)
3. Jonny Cooper (Dublin)
4. Philly McMahon (Dublin)
5. Lee Keegan (Mayo)
6. Colm Boyle (Mayo)
7. Patrick Durcan (Mayo)
8. Brian Fenton (Dublin)
9. Mattie Donnelly (Tyrone)
10. Kevin McLoughlin (Mayo)
11. Diarmuid Connolly (Dublin)
12. Ciarán Kilkenny (Dublin)
13. Paul Geaney (Kerry)
14. Michael Quinlivan (Tipperary)
15. Dean Rock (Dublin)

All Star Team of the Year

The All Star football team was announced on 3 November.

1. David Clarke (Mayo)
2. Brendan Harrison (Mayo)
3. Jonny Cooper (Dublin)
4. Philly McMahon (Dublin)
5. Lee Keegan (Mayo)
6. Colm Boyle (Mayo)
7. Ryan McHugh (Donegal)
8. Brian Fenton (Dublin)
9. Mattie Donnelly (Tyrone)
10. Peter Harte (Tyrone)
11. Diarmuid Connolly (Dublin)
12. Ciarán Kilkenny (Dublin)
13. Dean Rock (Dublin)
14. Michael Quinlivan (Tipperary)
15. Paul Geaney (Kerry)

== See also ==
- 2016 Tipperary county football team season
- 2016 Mayo county football team season
- 2016 Down county football team season
- 2016 Galway county football team season
