= Eugene Murtagh =

Irish businessman (born 1942)

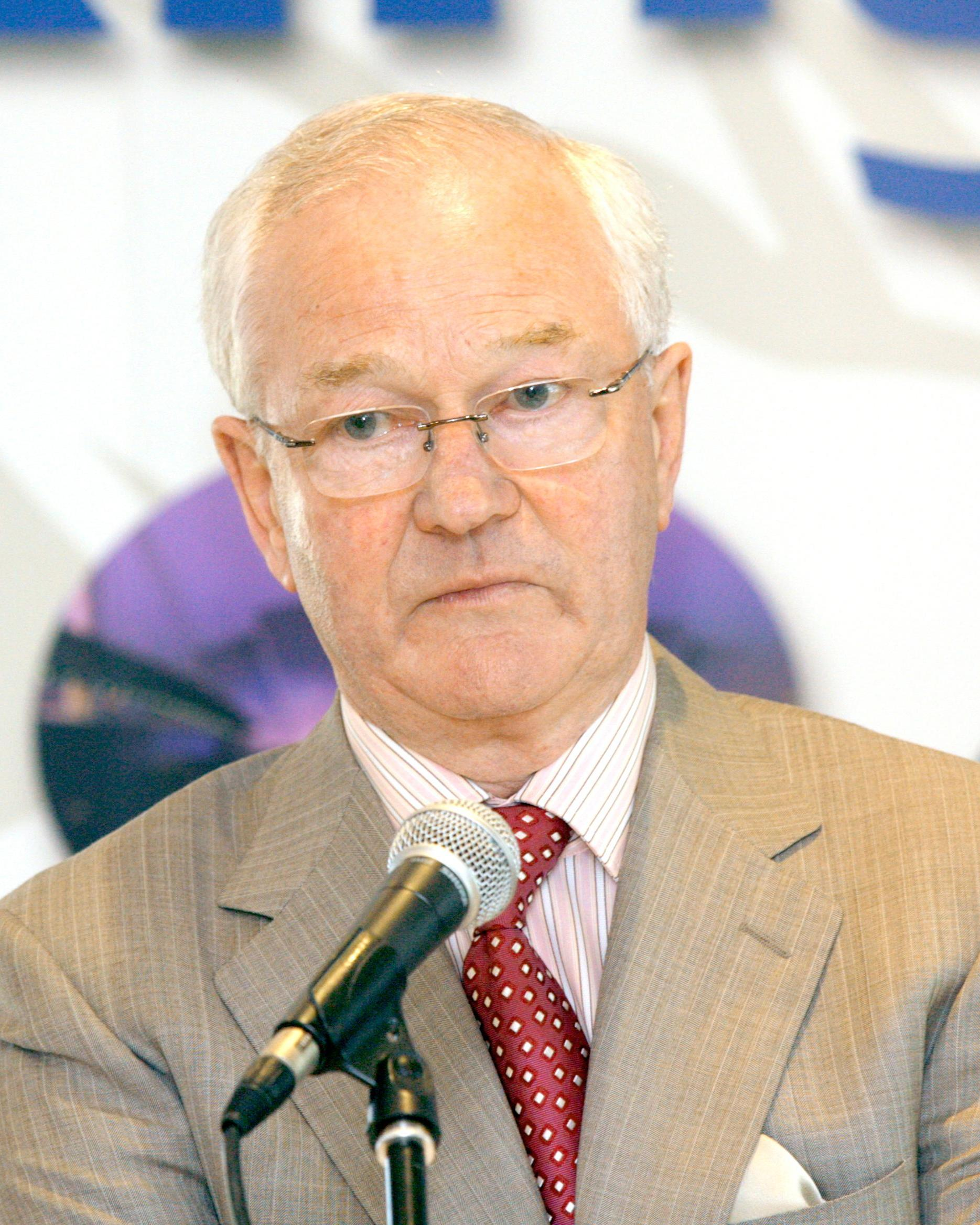
- Born: 23 June 1942 (age 82); Kingscourt, County Cavan, Ireland
- Occupation: Businessman
- Title: President Emeritus, Kingspan Group
- Spouse: Andrea Carolan (d. 2014)
- Children: 5

Eugene Murtagh (born 23 June 1942) is an Irish billionaire businessman, and the founder and chairman of Kingspan Group, a building materials manufacturer.

== Early life ==
Eugene Murtagh was born on 23 June 1942, in Kingscourt, County Cavan, Ireland, where he grew up in the same street as his future wife Andrea Carolan.

== Career ==
In the early 1960s, when he was a fitter and she was a hairdresser, they started a business making trailers. He founded Kingspan in 1971.

Murtagh is chairman of Kingspan, and was CEO until 2005, when he was succeeded by his son, Gene Murtagh. He owns 16% of Kingspan.

== Personal life ==
He was married to Andrea Carolan until her death in 2014, and they had five children together. He lives in Kingscourt, County Cavan, Ireland.
