= 2008 Ulster Senior Football Championship =

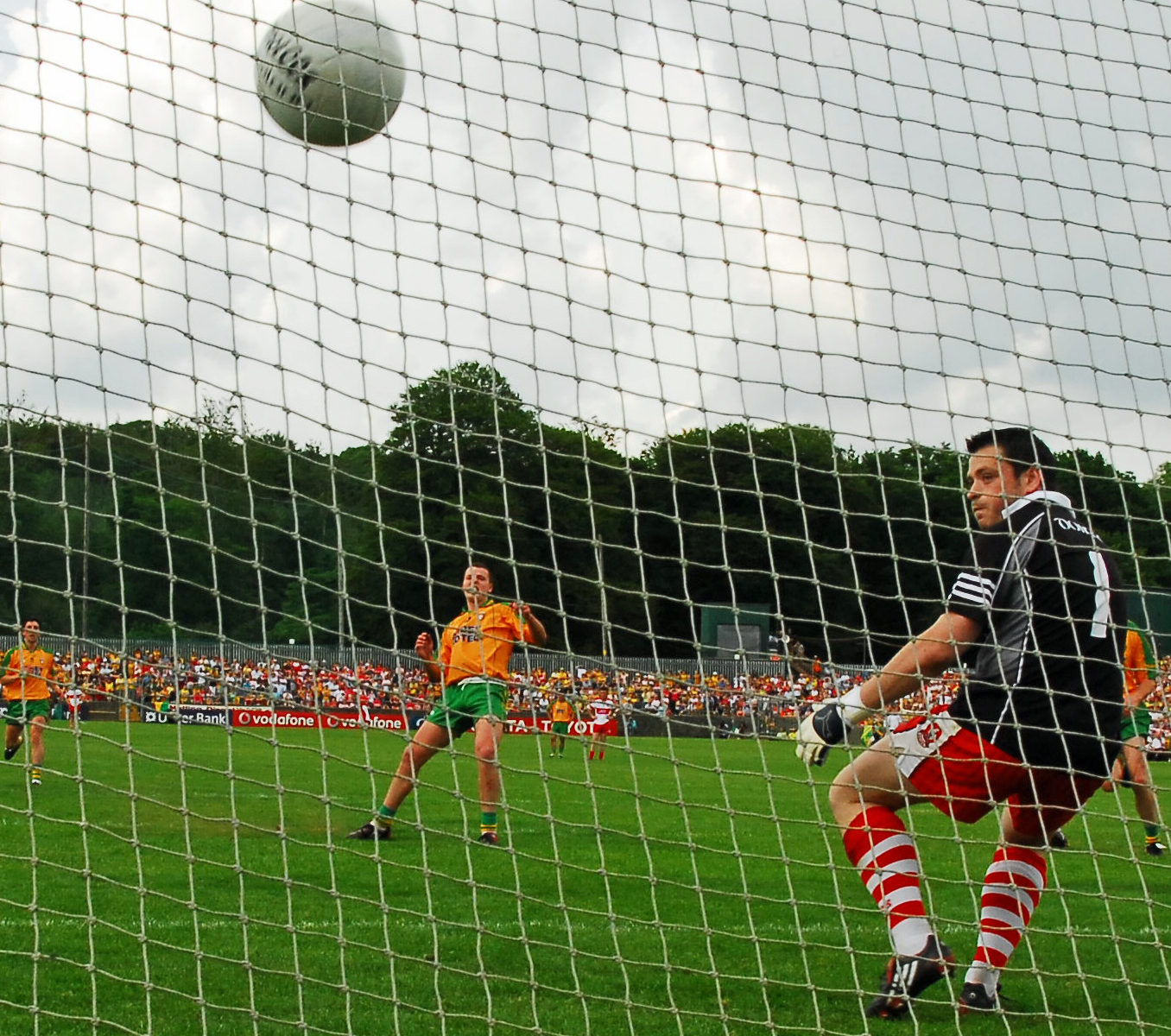
Michael Murphy scores a penalty against Derry in the 2008 Ulster Senior Football Championship

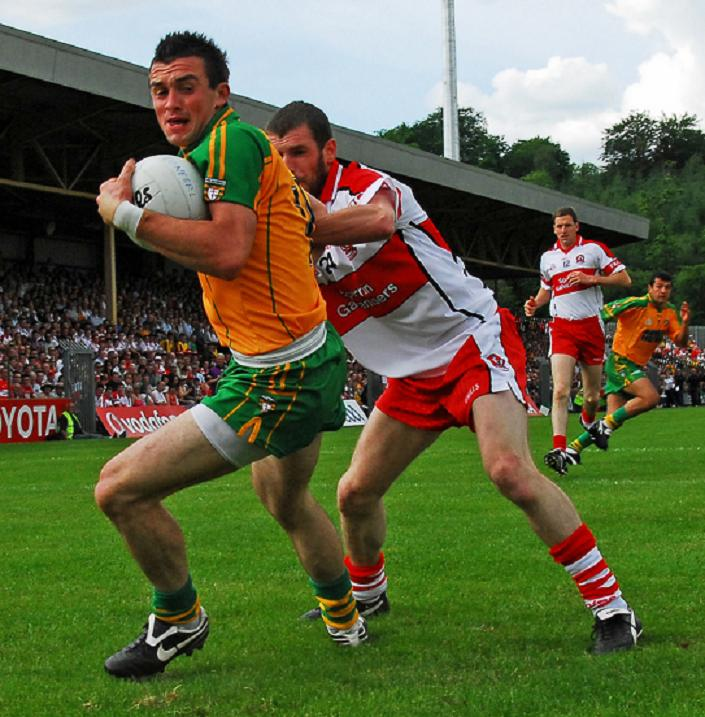
David Walsh of Donegal (left) being manhandled by Derry's Francis McEldowney during the 2008 Ulster Senior Football Championship

The 2008 Ulster Senior Football Championship was the 120th installment of the annual Ulster Senior Football Championship held under the auspices of the Ulster GAA. It was won by Armagh who defeated Fermanagh in the final after a replay. This was Armagh's sixth title since the turn of the century and their 14th overall. Fermanagh were appearing in their first final since 1982.

Steven McDonnell, 2003's Player of the Year, was the top scorer, hitting 1-17 in Armagh's run to victory in Ulster. Although defeated after a replay by Down in the first round of the Ulster Championship, Tyrone emerged as victors in the 2008 All-Ireland Senior Football Championship, beating Kerry in the 2008 All-Ireland Senior Football Championship Final.

== Draw ==
With the usual nine teams contesting the Championship, Antrim and Cavan met in the preliminary round to reduce the field to eight. The draw, made in October 2007, also produced two big opening round clashes: Tyrone against Down and Donegal against Derry.

== Bracket ==
Preliminary round
Antrim	1–14
Cavan	1–19

Quarter-finals
Fermanagh	2–8
Monaghan	0–10
Donegal	1–12
Derry	1–14
Tyrone	0–21
Down	1–19
Cavan	0–13
Armagh	0–17

Semi-finals
Fermanagh	1–11
Derry	1–9
Down	0–11
Armagh	1–12

Final
Fermanagh (R)	1-11; 0–8
Armagh (R)	2-8; 1–11

== Match details ==
Game	Date	Venue	Team A	Score	Team B	Score	Report
Ulster SFC; Preliminary Round	May 18	Casement Park, Belfast	Antrim; CJ McGourty 1-4, P Cunningham 0-4 (0-3 frees), T McCann 0-3 (0-1 free, 0-1 '45'), K Niblock, M Magill 0-1 each	1-14 (17)	Cavan; S Johnston 0-8 (0-1 free), D McCabe 1-1 (0-1 free), M Reilly 0-3, R Flanagan, J O'Reilly 0-2, M Cahill, M McDonald 0-1 each	1-19 (22)	
Ulster SFC; Quarter Final	May 25	Brewster Park, Enniskillen	Fermanagh; C McElroy 1-1, L McBarron 1-0, R Keenan 0-3 (0-3 frees), M McGrath, M Little, E Maguire, S McCabe (0-1 each)	2-8 (14)	Monaghan; P Finlay 0-3 (0-1 free), T Freeman 0-3 (0-2 frees), E Lennon, C McManus, V Corey, C Hanratty (0-1 each); G McQuaid SO	0-10 (10)	
Ulster SFC; Quarter Final	June 1	MacCumhaill Park, Ballybofey	Donegal; C McFadden 0-6 (0-3 frees), M Murphy 1-1 (1-00 pen), R Kavanagh 0-2, B Monaghan, K Cassidy, D Walsh 0-1 each	1-12 (15)	Derry; P Bradley 0-10 (0-7 frees), E Bradley 1-1, C Gilligan 0-2 (0-2 frees), E. Muldoon 0-1	1-14 (17)	
Ulster SFC; Quarter Final	June 8	Healy Park, Omagh	Tyrone; S Cavanagh, C McCullagh 1-2 each, B Dooher, M Penrose, C Cavanagh (0-1 free), K Hughes 0-1 each	2-8 (14)	Down; A Rodgers 1-1, B Coulter 1-0, L Doyle 0-2 (0-2 frees), D Gordon 0-2, R Sexton 0-1, P McCumiskey 0-1(0-1 free), P Murphy 0-1 each	2-8 (14)	
Ulster SFC; Quarter Final Replay	June 14	Pairc Esler, Newry	Down; L Doyle 0-6 (6f), B Coulter 1-3, A Carr 0-4 (3f, 1 '45'), P Murphy, D Gordon, A Rodgers, D Hughes, J Clarke, K McKernan 0-1 each	1-19 (22) AET	Tyrone; T McGuigan 0-6 (0-4 frees), C Cavanagh 0-4 (0-4 frees), S Cavanagh, C McCullagh 0-4 (0-1 free) each, P Jordan, R Mellon, M Penrose 0-1 each	0-21 (21) AET	
Ulster SFC; Quarter Final	June 15	Breffni Park, Cavan	Armagh; S McDonnell 0-6 (0-1 free, 0-1 '45'), S Kernan 0-3, A Kernan 0-2 (0-1 free), R Clarke 0-2, P McKeever, P McGrane, C Vernon, K Toner 0-1 each	0-17 (17)	Cavan; S Johnston 0-6 (0-3 frees), D McCabe 0-3 (0-2 frees), C Mackey 0-2, M Reilly, M McKeever 0-1 each	0-13 (13)	
Ulster SFC; Semi Final	June 21	Healy Park, Omagh	Fermanagh; R Keenan 0-4 (0-3 frees), B Owens 1-0, E Maguire 0-2, D Kelly, T McElroy, M McGrath, M Little, L McBarron 0-1 each	1-11 (14)	Derry; E Bradley 1-1, P Bradley 0-3 (0-1 free), C Gilligan 0-2 (0-1 free, 0-1 '45'), R wilkinson 0-2, M McIver 0-1	1-9 (12)	
Ulster SFC; Semi Final	June 29	St Tiernach's Park, Clones	Down; A Carr 0-6 (0-6 frees), D Hughes, R Murtagh, D Gordon, J Colgan, P McComiskey 0-1 each	0-11 (11)	Armagh; S Kernan 1-2, R Clarke 0-3, S McDonnell 0-3, B Donaghy 0-1, P McKeever 0-1 (0-1 free), A O'Rourke 0-1, B Mallon 0-1	1-12 (15)	
Ulster SFC; Final	July 20	St Tiernach's Park, Clones	Fermanagh; E Maguire 1-0, M McGrath 0-2, C McElroy 0-2, M Little 0-2 (0-2 frees), S McDermott 0-1, T McElroy 0-1, M Murphy 0-1, R Keenan 0-1 (0-1 free), S Doherty 0-1	1-11 (14)	Armagh; S McDonnell 0-6 (0-1 free), R Clarke 1-1, F Moriarty 1-0, K Toner 0-1	2-8 (14)	
Ulster SFC; Final Replay	July 27	St Tiernach's Park, Clones	Fermanagh; E Maguire, T Brewster (1f) 0-2 each, D Kelly, R Keenan, M Little (1f), S McCabe 0-1 each	0-8 (8)	Armagh; S McDonnell 1-2 (1f), A Kernan 0-4 (4f), R Clarke, T Kernan (1f) 0-2 each, B Mallon 0-1	1-11 (14)	

== Top scorers ==
- Steve McDonnell 1-17 (20)
- Seanie Johnston 0-14 (14)
- Paddy Bradley 0-13 (13)
- Ronan Clarke 1-9 (12)
- Aidan Carr 0-10 (10)
- Colm McCullagh 1-6 (9)
- Benny Coulter 2-3 (9)
