= Kingspan =

Irish building materials company

Kingspan Group plc
- Type: Public limited company
- Traded as: Euronext Dublin: KRX; LSE: 0KGP; ISEQ 20 component
- ISIN: IE0004927939
- Founded: 1965
- Founder: Eugene Murtagh
- Headquarters: Kingscourt, County Cavan, Ireland
- Key people: Jost Massenberg, Chairman; Gene Murtagh, CEO
- Products: Insulated panels and facades, Insulation, Structural, Solar and Renewables Engineered Timber Systems, Access Floors, Wind Turbines, Septic Tanks
- Revenue: ▲€ 9.199 billion (2025)
- Operating income: ▲€ 903.5 million (2025)
- Net income: ▲€ 715.7 million (2025)
- Number of employees: 27,000 (2026)
- Website: www.kingspan.com/

Kingspan Group plc is a building materials company headquartered in Ireland, trading in over 80 countries with more than 278 sites employing 27,450 people as of December 2025. The company operates with five divisions: Panels, Insulation, Light-Air-Water (KLAW), Data Solutions and Roof & Waterproofing. Panels is the biggest of the divisons with 55% of the tunover.

== History ==
The business was founded in 1965 by Eugene Murtagh in the yard behind the family pub in Kingscourt, County Cavan, Ireland. The pub was then being run by his brother. The business began as a small engineering operation, initially focused on manufacturing steel agricultural trailers and precast concrete septic tanks for farmers. The Kingspan business was originally called Kilgoban Ltd before it was rebranded to Kingscourt Construction Group and then to Kingspan in 1972. He started to rolling cold metal to produce single-skin roof panels, followed by purlins and rails.

In April 1975, Eugene Murtagh signed an agreement with Frank Ward to roll Ward’s purlin and rail design in Ireland under licence. The same year, the company built its first office next to its manufacturing operations on Dublin Road in Kingscourt. In 1976, Murtagh made a major investment to construct a factory for the production of the company’s first insulated roof panel. This facility was located on the other side of Kingscourt.

The company floated on the Dublin Unlisted Market in 1989 with a value of approximately IR£20 million.

Kingspan expanded through greenfield developments and acquisitions. Acquisitions included the European insulation arm of CRH plc in 2010 and elements of the construction division of ThyssenKrupp in 2012. 2010 marked the first year of sales growth after three years of decline.

In 2011, the company set a net zero energy target for its operations by 2020. In December 2019 it launched "Planet Passionate", a 10-year global sustainability programme focused on carbon, energy, circularity and water, with the aim of supporting a net-zero emissions built environment. The programme includes targets such as net-zero carbon manufacturing by 2030 and significant reductions in Scope 1 and 2 greenhouse gas emissions.

In 2005, the company announced the appointment of Gene Murtagh as its chief executive, making him the youngest CEO on the Irish Stock Exchange.

In 2022, following the full-scale Russian invasion of Ukraine, Kingspan announced plans to invest in a new manufacturing campus near Lviv. The project, later valued at approximately €280 million, is intended to produce advanced insulation, energy-efficient building materials and district heating solutions to support Ukraine's reconstruction. Kingspan received its first building permit and began site preparation in April 2025.

Kingspan cancelled its listing on the Official List of the Financial Conduct Authority and its admission to trading on the London Stock Exchange Main Market with effect from 8:00 a.m. (Dublin time) on 18 August 2023. The company retained its primary listing on Euronext Dublin.

In January 2024, the company acquired a 51 per cent stake in Steico for €250 million.

The insulation products sold by Kingspan in 2024 will, over the course of their expected lifespan of 60 years, save an estimated total of 172,000,000 tonnes of CO_{2}e.

In October 2025, Kingspan's data centre subsidiary, Tate, announced a $61.2 million investment to open a North American manufacturing plant in Glasgow, Kentucky. It was expected that the project would create 400 new full-time manufacturing jobs once the 764,000 square feet (71,000 m^{2}) facility was fully operational.

In 2025, Kingspan revised its operating segment structure to two primary reportable segments: Insulated Building Envelopes and Advnsys (previously known as Advanced Building Systems, incorporating earlier Data Solutions and Light, Air + Water activities). Advnsys focuses on bespoke critical infrastructure solutions, primarily for data centres (including raised access floors, containment, air handling, liquid cooling, ventilation and daylighting systems). The change reflected the group’s “Completing the Envelope” strategy, acquisitions, and internal management reporting. In September 2025, Kingspan announced it was exploring a minority initial public offering of approximately 25% of Advnsys on Euronext Amsterdam, potentially as early as the first quarter of 2026, citing strong growth linked to AI-driven data-centre demand and an opportunity to unlock value while retaining majority ownership. In January 2026, the company cancelled the IPO plans and retained 100% ownership, stating that investor interest had been strong but that full ownership better maximised long-term shareholder value given accelerating order-book momentum and outlook. Kingspan’s involvement in data-centre flooring and related systems dates to its 1998 acquisition of Hewetson and subsequent deals including Tate (2001) and others.

In August 2026, Kingspan agreed to acquire BMC Manufacturing Group, an Irish designer and manufacturer of low-voltage switchgear and power-management systems for data centres, for an initial €850 million (plus up to €50 million deferred consideration). Completion is subject to regulatory clearance and is expected in the fourth quarter of 2026.

== Acquisitions ==
Kingspan has expanded through a number of acquisitions, mainly bolt-on deals that extend its geographic reach and product range across insulation, insulated panels, roofing and waterproofing, light and air systems, and data-centre solutions. The table lists major and notable acquisitions; many smaller bolt-ons are aggregated in annual reports and not listed individually.

Year	Business / Division	Company name(s)	Notes
1973	Insulated Panels	Sec-Form	Company-reported historical acquisition.
1980	Insulation	Shelter Insulation	Company-reported historical acquisition.
1986	Insulation	Torvale Group Ltd.	Company-reported historical acquisition.
1990	—	Kuiper van der Jooij’s; Plaschem	Company-reported historical acquisition.
1991	Insulation	Coolag	Company-reported historical acquisition.
1996	Insulation	Kooltherm Insulated Ltd.	Company-reported historical acquisition.
1996	Water & Energy	Titan Tanks, Polmeric and Armet Plastics	Company-reported historical acquisition.
1998	Data & Flooring	Hewetson (USA), Durabella (UK)	Entry into raised-access flooring and data solutions.
1998	Insulated Panels	Ward Building Components	The business that gave the design licence in 1975
1998	Insulated Panels	Sunip (Czech Republic)	Acquired March 1998 for cash consideration of approximately £650,000 plus assumption of debt. Czech composite/insulated panel manufacturer based in Hradec Králové; Kingspan’s first acquisition in Central and Eastern Europe. Subsequently operated as Kingspan Insulated Panels Czech Republic.
2000	Water & Energy	Klargester, Plastech, Ferham, Entec	Company-reported historical acquisition.
2001	Data & Flooring	Tate Global Corporation	Key US platform; consideration up to US$120 million.
2006	Insulated Panels	Zer-O-Loc	Company-reported historical acquisition.
2006	Insulated Panels	Izopoli (Turkey)	51% stake acquired November 2006. Turkish manufacturer of insulated and cold-storage sandwich panels. Deal valued at approximately €7–7.6 million.
2006	Insulated Panels	Eurobond Pacific (Australia)	51% controlling stake acquired c. 2006 (completed early 2007). Australian insulated panel manufacturer; formed the basis of Kingspan’s insulated panels operations in Australia (later known as Kingspan Insulated Panels Australia).
2006	Timber / Off-Site	Potton (UK)	Acquired 2006. UK heritage timber-frame and self-build homebuilder (founded 1964). Integrated into what became Kingspan Timber Solutions / Kingspan Off-Site. Later sold by Kingspan Timber Solutions to Home@ix Ltd in November 2025.
2007	Insulated Panels	Coldmatic Building Systems	Company-reported historical acquisition.
2007	Renewables	Thermomax solar vacuum tube	Company-reported historical acquisition.
2007	Water & Energy / Environmental	Deso Engineering (DESO) (UK)	Acquired in 2007. UK manufacturer of rotationally moulded plastic bunded and single-skin tanks for fuel, oil, diesel, AdBlue and water storage, based in Williton, Somerset. Brand and operations form part of Kingspan Water + Safe Storage (formerly Kingspan Environmental / Water & Energy).
2008	Insulated Panels	Metecno	US panels entry.
2009	Insulation	AIR-CELL Innovations Pty	Company-reported historical acquisition.
2011	Renewables	PROVEN Energy Ltd	Company-reported historical acquisition.
2011	Insulation	CRH Insulation Europe (CIE)	Company-reported historical acquisition.
2012	Insulated Panels	ThyssenKrupp Construction Group elements; Rigidal Industries LLC (including ISOCab & ISOMasters)	Company-reported historical acquisition.
2014	Insulated Panels	Pactiv Corp North American building products	Company-reported historical acquisition.
2014	Insulation	PAL	Company-reported historical acquisition.
2014	Insulated Panels / Architectural façades	Dri-Design Inc. (USA)	95% of share capital acquired 28 February 2014. High-end rainscreen / architectural façade cassette business. Consideration approximately €28.6 million.
2015	Insulation	Tarec, SPU Oy	Company-reported historical acquisition.
2015	Exterior Building Products	Vicwest	Company-reported historical acquisition.
2015	Insulated Panels	Joris Ide (Belgium)	Approx. €315 million (incl. debt). Major European expansion.
2015	Insulated Panels	All Weather Insulated Panels (AWIP) (USA / Canada)	Acquired as part of the Vicwest Building Products transaction (completed 2015). Vicwest had previously taken a majority stake in AWIP in 2013. North American manufacturer of insulated metal wall, roof and deck panels with facilities in the USA and Canada; continues to operate as a distinct brand within Kingspan.
2016	Light & Air	Essmann (Germany), STG Beikirch (Germany), Ecodis (France), Bristolite (USA)	Company-reported historical acquisition.
2017	Insulated Panels	Isoeste (Brazil)	Acquired 51% controlling stake, structured and operated as a joint venture/partnership with the founders (Kingspan Isoeste).
2017	Light & Air	Brakel (Netherlands)	Company-reported historical acquisition.
2017	Water & Energy	Fuel Tank Shop (UK) / FUEL TANK SHOP LTD	Online fuel and oil tank retailer based in Minehead, Somerset. Control of FUEL TANK SHOP LTD (Companies House 07856014) transferred in November 2017; subsequently operated as a trading entity of Kingspan Water & Energy Ltd. Estimated turnover approximately £5 million at the time of acquisition.
2018	Insulated Panels / Insulation	Synthesia Group including Poliuretanos S.A. Huurre Iberica S.A.(Spain, Latin America)	Approx. €250 million package (incl. debt).
2018	Insulated Panels / Insulation	Balex Metal sp. z.o.o (Poland)	Company-reported historical acquisition.
2019	Insulated Panels	Group Bacacier SAS including Bacacier & La Maison de l’Étancheur	Company-reported historical acquisition.
2019	Water & Energy	EPUR (Belgium / France)	Acquired October 2019. Specialist in non-collective sanitation (assainissement non collectif), including micro-stations and compact filters (BIOFRANCE range). Integrated into Kingspan Water & Energy / Kingspan Epur, strengthening wastewater and water-management offering in France and related markets.
2020	Light & Air	Colt Group	Completed April 2020.
2021	Technical insulation	Logstor Group (Denmark)	Approx. €244–253 million.
2021	Insulated Panels	TeraSteel (Romania)	Approx. €82 million.
2021	Insulated Panels	ООО «Крон» (Kron) / Nevinnomyssk plant (Russia)	Acquired early 2021 (completed beginning of 2021) for more than 300 million roubles. Former sandwich-panel plant in Nevinnomyssk, Stavropol Krai; capacity planned at up to 1.5 million m² per year. Part of Kingspan’s Russian operations (later divested to local management in April 2022).
2021	Insulation	Thermakraft Ltd (Australasia)	Acquired July 2021. New Zealand–based manufacturer of building wraps, roofing underlays, flashing tapes and roof safety mesh (including Australian Mesh / Ausmesh operations). Strengthens Kingspan Insulation’s membrane and underlay offering in Australia and New Zealand.
2021	Light & Air	Major Industries, Inc. (USA)	Acquired 2021 by Kingspan Light + Air. US manufacturer of FRP (fibreglass-reinforced polymer) panel daylighting solutions (wall systems and skylights). Integrated into the North American Light & Air portfolio.
2021	Light & Air	Solatube International, Inc. (USA)	Acquired December 2021 (deal closed 10 December). Leading manufacturer of tubular daylighting devices (TDDs) and related ventilation systems, based in Vista, California. Continues to operate as a distinct brand under Kingspan Light + Air.
2021	Light & Air	Skydôme (France)	Acquired April 2021 (completed) as part of the skylights division of SMAC. French specialist in daylighting, natural ventilation, smoke extraction and roofing-access systems (including Skydôme Iberica). Integrated into Kingspan Light + Air.
2021	Light & Air	Essemes Services (France)	Acquired April 2021 (completed) together with Skydôme from SMAC. Specialises in the installation of skylights and the maintenance of fire-safety equipment. Operates under Kingspan Light + Air.
2021	Insulated Panels	Bromyros (Uruguay, 51%)	Acquired 51% stake in 2021. Uruguayan manufacturer of insulated panels and related construction products (founded 1948). Structured as a controlling stake / joint-venture style holding; integrated with Kingspan Isoeste operations in South America.
2022	Roofing & Waterproofing	Ondura Group	Approx. €516 million. Core of new Roofing & Waterproofing division.
2022	Roofing & Waterproofing	Derbigum (Belgium)	Approx. €95 million.
2022	Insulation	Troldtekt (Denmark)	Approx. €220 million; natural acoustic products.
2022	Insulation	Calostat (from Evonik)	High-performance mineral insulation boards.
2022	Insulated Panels	THU Perfil S.L. (THU) (Spain)	Acquired February 2022. Valencian manufacturer of metal ceiling profiles, technical ceilings, roofing, drywall and partition systems (Ribarroja de Turia). Sales had grown from approximately €10 million (2015) to €45 million (2021) under previous ownership. Complements Kingspan’s building envelope and enclosure portfolio.
2023	Roofing & Waterproofing	CaPlast (Germany) including NOW Contec	Approx. €87 million.
2023	Insulated Panels	Alaço (Portugal)	Part of the group of smaller 2023 acquisitions (combined consideration ~€139 million).
2023	Insulated Panels	LRM (France)	Part of the group of smaller 2023 acquisitions (combined consideration ~€139 million).
2023	Insulated Panels	MontFrio (Uruguay)	51% stake. Part of the group of smaller 2023 acquisitions (combined consideration ~€139 million).
2023	Insulated Panels / Insulation	Toode Group (Baltics)	Part of the group of smaller 2023 acquisitions (combined consideration ~€139 million).
2023	Insulation	HempFlax Building Solutions (Germany)	80% stake. Part of the group of smaller 2023 acquisitions (combined consideration ~€139 million).
2023	Insulation	Thor Building Products (Australia)	Part of the group of smaller 2023 acquisitions (combined consideration ~€139 million).
2023	Data / Advnsys	Q-nis (Ireland)	Part of the group of smaller 2023 acquisitions (combined consideration ~€139 million).
2023	Insulated Panels	Provan Group (Belgium)	Part of the group of smaller 2023 acquisitions (combined consideration ~€139 million).
2024	Insulation	STEICO SE (Germany)	51% stake (later increased); total consideration ~€510 million (incl. net debt/deferred). World-leading wood-fibre insulation.
2024	Roofing & Waterproofing	Nordic Waterproofing (Sweden)	Controlling stake (62.6% then higher; later full ownership). Significant multi-year investment.
2024	Insulated Panels	Conqueror (New Zealand)	Business and assets (insulated panels and boards). Commerce Commission clearance December 2023; completed January 2024.
2024	Insulated Panels	Rafinor & Eftex (Denmark)	100%.
2024	Insulated Panels	Clastina (Belgium)	100%. Completed April 2024.
2024	Insulation	Bachl stonewool assets (Germany)	Stonewool manufacturing business and assets from Karl Bachl. Completed April 2024.
2024	Insulation	TreeTops (Denmark)	75% stake. Conditionally approved by Danish Competition Council (divestiture of wood-wool ceiling tiles business).
2024	Light, Air + Water	Visa Oeste & Petaproj (Portugal)	100%. Completed April 2024.
2024	Insulation	Isolco (Netherlands)	Acoustic business and assets. Completed May 2024.
2024	Insulated Panels	Fatek Advance Insulation (Thailand)	70% stake. Completed June 2024.
2024	Insulated Panels	KZK (Netherlands)	100%. Completed July 2024.
2024	Insulated Panels	Siegmetall (Germany)	100%. Completed September 2024.
2024	Roofing & Waterproofing	IB Roof Systems (USA)	90% stake (founder retained 10%). First US single-ply PVC roofing acquisition. Completed September 2024.
2024	Insulated Panels	PSP Profile (France)	100%. Completed October 2024.
2024	Light, Air + Water	National Poly Industries (Australia)	100%. Completed October 2024.
2024	Insulated Panels	Solen Energy (UK)	85% stake. Completed November 2024.
2024	Insulated Panels	Villalba (Chile)	Acquired 51% controlling stake, structured and operated as a joint venture/partnership with the founding family. Completed November 2024.
2024	Insulated Panels	TPF (France)	Certain business and assets. Completed December 2024.
2025	Insulation	Hao Wei (Singapore / Malaysia)	85% stake. First local XPS manufacturing facility in Asia for Kingspan Insulation. Completed March 2025.
2025	Advnsys	RXL (USA)	70% stake. Data solutions business in California. Completed March 2025.
2025	Roofing & Waterproofing	Eurotag (Denmark)	100%. Distributor of Derbigum roofing solutions; integrated into Derbigum. Completed April 2025.
2025	Insulated Building Envelopes	Meta Soluciones (Spain)	100%. Completed July 2025.
2025	Insulated Building Envelopes	Suomen (Finland)	100%. Completed July 2025.
2025	Advnsys	Sandometal (Portugal)	100%. Air handling business. Completed July 2025.
2025	Water & Energy	Permastore (UK)	100%. Completed July 2025.
2025	Roofing / cladding	Coverworld (UK)	100%. CMA cleared; completed August 2025.
2025	Advnsys / Light & Air	Mercor ventilation and daylighting business (Poland)	100%. Approx. €100 million. Leading provider of daylighting and smoke management systems in Central Europe. Completed October 2025.
2025	Advnsys	Fabtek (Vietnam)	100%. Supports APAC expansion. Completed December 2025.
2026	Advnsys / Data	BMC Manufacturing (Ireland)	Up to €900 million (initial €850 million: €600 million cash + €250 million new shares). Largest deal to date; data-centre power systems. Pending completion.
2026	Insulated Panels	Duggan Profiles	CCPC cleared May 2026.
2026	Advnsys / Data	Multiway (Brazil)	Majority stake; data-centre infrastructure.
2026	Renewables / Solar mounting	Mounting Systems assets (via Dome Solar)	March 2026 asset acquisition by Kingspan subsidiary Dome Solar of the Mounting Systems brand, key intellectual property, and specific flat-roof technologies (LightX and FD3). Not a full company purchase.
2026	Insulated Panels	Grupo LTN (Argentina)	Majority stake / strategic integration.

=== Joint ventures ===
- Kingspan–Izopoli (Turkey, 2006): 51% stake in Izopoli, a Turkish manufacturer of insulated and cold-storage sandwich panels. The partnership gave Kingspan access to markets in the Middle East, Balkans and Central Asia.
- Kingspan–Eurobond Pacific (Australia, c. 2006): 51% controlling stake in Eurobond Pacific, an Australian insulated panel manufacturer. This formed the foundation of Kingspan’s insulated panels business in Australia.
- Kingspan Isoeste (Brazil, 2017): 51% controlling stake in Isoeste, structured and operated as a joint venture/partnership with the founders.
- Kingspan Jindal (India, with Jindal Mectec, established 2018): Joint venture manufacturing insulated sandwich panels and building envelope systems.
- Bromyros (Uruguay) – In 2021 Kingspan acquired a 51% controlling stake in Bromyros, a Uruguayan manufacturer of insulated panels and related construction products (founded 1948, with facilities in Montevideo and Canelones). The holding is structured as a controlling interest and is operated in partnership with the continuing involvement of the founding Thomsen family; the business is integrated with Kingspan Isoeste operations in South America.
- Kingspan MV / MV Aceros (Paraguay, 2024): Joint venture / controlling interest for insulated metal panels and metal products for the local market.
- Villalba (Chile, 2024): 51% controlling stake in Villalba Aceros, structured and operated as a joint venture/partnership with the founding family.
- Grupo LTN (Argentina, 2026): Strategic joint venture / majority stake for insulated panels and related solutions in Argentina and South America.

=== Joris Ide (Belgium) acquisitions and additions since Kingspan ownership ===
Kingspan acquired Joris Ide Group (via Steel Partners NV) in early 2015 for approximately €315 million. The business has continued to operate largely as a distinct brand and division within Kingspan’s Insulated Panels activities, while making a series of further acquisitions.

Joris Ide acquisitions and additions since 2015
Year	Company / asset	Location	Notes
2016	Euroclad (Holdings) Limited (Euroclad)	United Kingdom (Cardiff)	Acquired by a Joris Ide subsidiary on 30 April 2016. Manufacturer of built-up metal roof and wall systems. Consideration (including debt/cash) approximately €58.4 million.
2016	Eurobond Laminates Limited	United Kingdom	Acquired August 2016 (following UK competition clearance). Former affiliate of Euroclad; manufacturer of stone wool fibre panels. Combined consideration for the Euro Group (Euroclad + Eurobond) approximately €94.2 million.
2016–2018	Balex Metal	Poland	Acquisition process commenced around 2016; Polish competition authority (UOKiK) clearance received July 2018. Joris Ide NV became the 100% owner.
2017	Manufacturing facility	Stadskanaal, Netherlands	Takeover of a factory.
2021	Wetterbest	Romania	Roofing systems business acquired into the broader Kingspan / Joris Ide structure.
2023	Alaço	Portugal (Ourém/Fatima)	Manufacturer of single-skin profiles, PIR insulated panels, purlins and accessories. Integrated into Joris Ide West-Europe operations.
2023	Toode / Janla	Finland, Estonia, Lithuania	Metal roofing and cladding businesses.
2024	Rafinor & Eftex	Denmark	Acquired by Joris Ide. Strengthened the division’s Scandinavian presence.
2024	KZK B.V.	Netherlands	Acquired; complementary to existing Dutch operations.
2024	Siegmetall	Germany (Haiger)	Acquisition completed 2 September 2024. Roll-forming and roof/wall products business employing over 90 people. Continues to operate as a brand under Joris Ide.
2024–2025	Meta Soluciones Metálicas Integrales S.L.	Spain (Torremajor)	Combi-panel (PIR and mineral wool) and roll-forming capabilities. Complements the Alaço portfolio in Iberia.

== Disposals ==
Year	Business / Division	Company / business sold	Buyer	Notes
1997	Structural steel	Ward structural steel contracting business (UK)	Management buy-out	Sold the structural steel contracting business of its Ward subsidiary (including continental European prefabricated business Atlas Bausysteme). Consideration for stock and debtors approx. £2.5 million; Kingspan retained preference shares. Annual turnover of the business approx. £50 million.
1999	Flooring / joinery	TL Bennet Holdings, Bennett Windows and Thomas Lowe Joinery	Management buy-out	Three companies acquired as part of the 1998 purchase of Hewetson. Sold for £4.48 million; expected profit on disposal approx. £100,000.
2022	Insulated Panels	Russian operations (Gatchina and Nevinnomyssk plants)	Divested/sold to local management	In April 2022 (decision taken early March). Included the former ООО «Крон» plant and the Gatchina facility (previously acquired via Joris Ide). Russia represented less than 1% of group operations; Kingspan products no longer available in Russia after the exit.
2025	Timber / Off-Site	Potton (UK)	Homeatix Ltd	Sold by Kingspan Timber Solutions Ltd in November 2025 (announced / completed around October–November 2025). UK heritage timber-frame and self-build homebuilder (acquired by Kingspan in 2006). Brand and associated assets transferred to "Homeatix.
2025	Door components	Kingspan Door Components (Belgium)	ASSA ABLOY	Belgian manufacturer of insulated sectional door panels for residential and industrial applications (founded 1983; ~70 employees). 2024 sales approx. €25 million. Integrated into ASSA ABLOY’s Entrance Systems Division.

== Initiatives ==
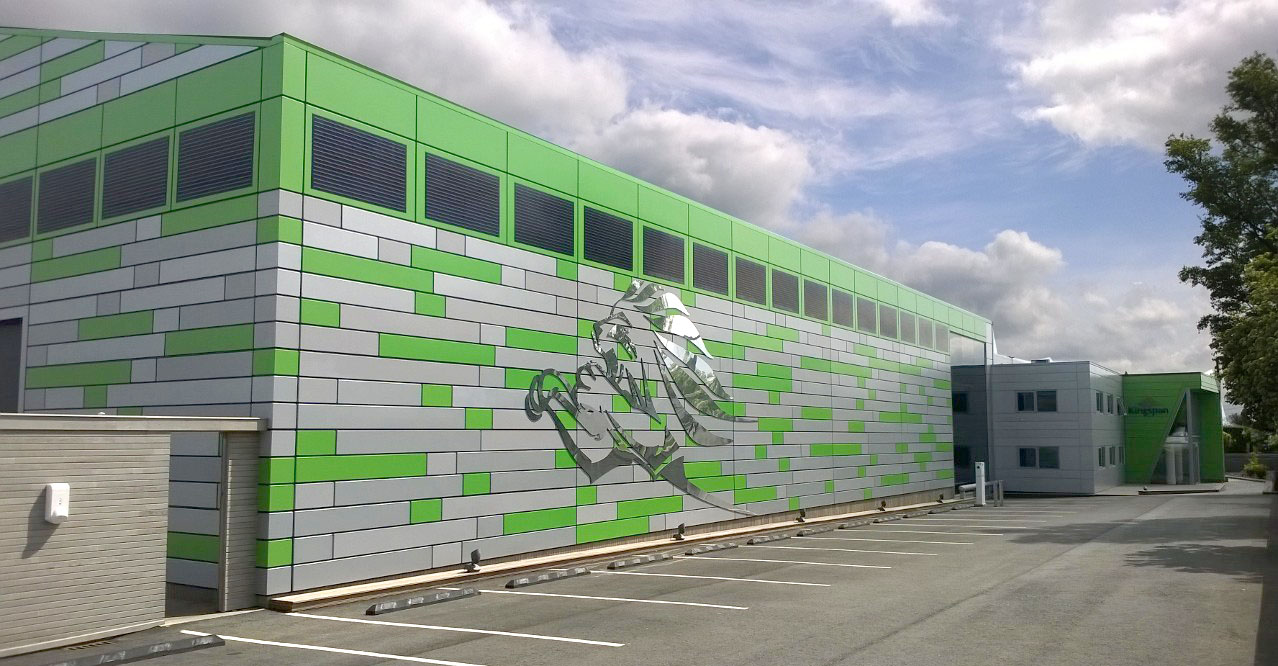
Kingspan Head Office in Kingscourt, Ireland

=== Innovation ===
Kingspan Group's new global innovation centre, 'IKON', opened in 2019 in Kingscourt, Ireland, next to the head office. Designed by 'MILLIMETRE DESIGN' (Dublin), it comprises 18 Kingspan products serving as a 'state-of-the-art' place of research and living research project. The facility has been modelled with a Digital Twin and leverages input from sensors, IoT devices, Virtual Reality (VR), Autodesk Forge and BIM Data to further enhance operational efficiency.

=== Sustainability ===
Approximately 39% of all greenhouse gas (CO_{2} and CO_{2}e) emissions globally come from construction and buildings in operation, so it is vital that more buildings decarbonise by incorporating insulation and using increasingly energy-efficient appliances.

In 2020, Kingspan Group achieved its fourth appearance on CDP’s prestigious ‘A-list’ for climate change. Joining the Renewable Energy 100 (RE100) initiative in 2010, the Group achieved Net Zero Energy across all manufacturing and office facilities globally by 2019. In 2019, the Group joined the Circular Economy 100 (CE100) initiative as a member.

Kingspan Group also launched its 10-year ‘Planet Passionate’ sustainability programme in 2019, consisting of twelve targets focused on the four key areas of; Energy, Carbon, Circularity and Water. As part of programme, the company announced its target to reduce carbon emissions by 90 per cent by 2030. One carbon target is to achieve net zero carbon manufacturing and a '50% reduction in product CO_{2} intensity from primary supply partners'. One circularity target is to upcycle 1 billion PET bottles into insulation by 2025, up from 256 million in 2018.

In 2023, the company reported a 26 per cent reduction in carbon emissions since 2020.

Kingspan Group have over 278 manufacturing sites, which are spread across 80 different countries

== Key products ==
Products include:

- QuadCore is Kingspan’s proprietary hybrid insulation core technology used in its insulated panels.
- AlphaCore is a range of microporous silica-based insulation boards produced by Kingspan’s Insulation division.
- OPTIM-R is a range of vacuum insulation panels (VIPs) produced by Kingspan’s Insulation division.
- PowerPanel is a factory-integrated insulated roof panel with photovoltaic (PV) modules fitted during manufacture.

== Controversies ==
=== Grenfell Tower fire ===
The Phase 1 Report of the Grenfell Inquiry stated that "the principal reason" for rapid fire spread on Grenfell was the unsafe ACM rainscreen with a plastic-core, which had been used as an external rainscreen on the Tower.

Although Zinc ACM rainscreen products were originally specified, the plastic-cored ACM panels were selected after the architect came under pressure "from the client regarding the costs with suggestions flagged of using aluminium. We (and the Planners) would much rather see zinc up there".

In November 2020, the official inquiry into the 2017 Grenfell Tower Fire heard evidence from Kingspan ex-technical project manager Ivor Meredith testified that Kingspan insulation product Kooltherm K15 was used as a small portion of the insulation component behind the rainscreen mounted on to Grenfell Tower. Around 5% of the insulation in the cladding on the tower was manufactured by Kingspan whilst the rest was manufactured by Celotex, a subsidiary of Saint Gobain. A previous version of the product had passed fire tests, but Meredith described a fire test using the version of the product used on Grenfell as a "raging inferno", with the insulation "burning on its own steam".

Also in November 2020, the inquiry learned that Kingspan employee Philip Heath had said, in 2008, that consultants who raised concerns about the combustibility of its product could "go f*ck themselves", and that they were "getting me confused with someone who gives a dam [sic]".

Kingspan subsequently issued a statement:

A small number of internal communications used language, and expressed sentiments on fire safety, that were totally unprofessional and utterly unacceptable. We have apologised and taken robust action to prevent any such behaviour from happening again. Further, as Kingspan has explained to the Inquiry:

- Following the change from “old technology” K15 to “new technology” K15 in 2006, it should have carried out a replacement of the 2005 BS 8414 test with "new technology" K15
- It should have made it clear that the two BS8414 tests carried out in March and July 2014 incorporated R&D variants of K15 rather than the standard K15 sold at that time
- Aspects of early versions on the LABC and BBA certificates were capable of being misunderstood and that such issues should have been drawn to the attention of the issuing bodies.

We have introduced measures that ensure the regime around fire safety tests meets the highest standards and is industry ‘best practice’.

Near the end of November 2020, it emerged that Kingspan executives had sold at least £6.5M of shares in the company shortly before Kingspan's inquiry hearings were due to start.

On 8 December 2020, the inquiry saw evidence that in November 2016, Kingspan technical staff had acknowledged internally that Kingspan was selling its Kooltherm K15 foam insulation product as less flammable than it really was.

On 9 December 2020, the inquiry was told that after the Grenfell fire, Kingspan had invested in a campaign to demonstrate that some non-combustible insulation would have reacted similarly to combustible insulation when used in conjunction with ACM. The campaign involved using non-standard test rigs to demonstrate that non-combustible products might in fact be flammable, and hiring lobbyists to present the results before policymakers such as the Housing, Communities and Local Government Committee and other MPs.

On 4 September 2024, the final report of Grenfell Tower Inquiry found Kingspan's "dishonest marketing" of its K15 product had "created the conditions" for Celotex, another insulation company, to target the market by "dishonest means". Kingspan had "long-running internal discussions about what it could get away with" that "betrayed no concern for accuracy", the report said.

==== Mercedes Formula 1 team sponsorship controversy ====
On 1 December 2021, the Mercedes F1 team signed a sponsorship deal with the Kingspan Group. The sponsorship debut was during the Saudi Arabia Grand Prix, which was held on the 3rd to the 5th of December 2021, the weekend that preceded the commencement of testimony by staff of the Department for Levelling Up, Housing and Communities (DLUHC) staff at the Grenfell Tower Inquiry. The Mercedes-Kingspan Group deal attracted criticism from then-minister for the Department for Levelling Up, Housing and Communities, Michael Gove.

Grenfell United, a group composed of the survivors of the Grenfell Fire also criticised the sponsorship. Mercedes subsequently agreed to review its decision and Mercedes F1 team boss, Toto Wolff, offered to meet and listen to the Grenfell fire survivors. On 8 December 2021, it was announced the deal between Kingspan and Mercedes F1 Team had been terminated with immediate effect.

== See also ==
- List of companies of Ireland
