= Éamonn Burns (Down Gaelic footballer) =

Irish Gaelic footballer and manager (1963–2019)

Personal information
- Native name: Éamonn Ó Broin (Irish)
- Born: 26 September 1963 Bryansford, County Down,
- Died: 9 October 2019 (aged 56) Bryansford, County Down,
- Occupation: Secondary school teacher

Sport
- Sport: Gaelic Football
- Position: Midfield
Club
- Years: Club
- Bryansford
Club titles
- Down titles: 0
Inter-county
- Years: County
- 1987–1998: Down
Inter-county titles
- Ulster titles: 2
- All-Irelands: 2
- NFL: 0
- All Stars: 0

Éamonn Burns (1963 – 9 October 2019) was an Irish Gaelic footballer and manager. He played for Down Senior Championship club Bryansford and was a member of the Down senior football team for over a decade, during which time he usually lined out at midfield. Burns was also a teacher at Shimna Integrated College.

== Honours ==
Down

- All-Ireland Senior Football Championship (2): 1991, 1994
- Ulster Senior Football Championship (2): 1991, 1994

Sporting positions
Preceded by Jim McCorry	Down Senior Football Manager; 2015–2018	Succeeded by Paddy Tally
