= 2023 Cavan county football team season =

Cavan
2023 season
- Manager: Mickey Graham
- Home venue: Kingspan Breffni, Cavan
- NFL (Division 3): Winners (promoted)
- Ulster Championship: Quarter-finals
- Tailteann Cup: Quarter-finals
- Dr McKenna Cup: Semi-finals
First colours	Second colours

The 2023 season was the Cavan county football team's fifth season under manager Mickey Graham. They competed in the third division of the National Football League, having been promoted as champions from Division 4 in 2022. They also competed in the Dr McKenna Cup, Ulster Championship, and the Tailteann Cup.

== Dr McKenna Cup ==
The draw for the Dr McKenna Cup was made on 13 December 2022. Cavan were drawn in Section C with Armagh and Antrim. Cavan opened the competition with a seven-point win over Antrim in Portglenone. Cavan won their second match against Armagh, reaching the semi-finals for the first time since 2016. Cavan faced Tyrone in the semi-final, with the Red Hands reaching the final after a five-point win.

=== Group stage ===
Pos	Team	Pld	W	D	L	PF	PA	PR	Pts	Qualification
1	Cavan	2	2	0	0	33	21	1.571	4	Advance to semi-final
2	Armagh	2	1	0	1	38	31	1.226	2	
3	Antrim	2	0	0	2	23	42	0.548	0	

Source: Ulster GAA

8 January 2023 Round 2	Antrim	0–9 – 2–10	Cavan	Portglenone
13:30 IST (UTC)	Dominic McEnhill 0–3 (0–3f), Ryan Murray 0–2 (0–1f), Pat Shivers 0–2, Ruairi McCann 0–1 (0–1 '45), Patrick McBride 0–1	Report	Oisin Brady 0–7 (0–4f, 0–1m), Martin Reilly 1–0, Brandon Boylan 1–0, Killian Clarke 0–2, Liam Brady 0–1 (0–1f)	Stadium: Kelly Park; Referee: Kevin Faloon

11 January 2023 Round 3	Cavan	1–14 – 1–9	Armagh	Cavan
19:30 IST (UTC)	Oisin Brady 0–3 (0–3f), Dara McVeety 0–3 (0–1m), Ryan O'Neill 1–0, Raymond Galligan 0–2 (0–2f), Brían O'Rourke 0–2 (0–1m), Martin Reilly 0–1, Cian Madden 0–1, Tiarnan Madden 0–1, Brandon Boylan 0–1	Report	Rory Grugan 0–3 (0–3f), Oisin Conaty 1–0, Aidan Nugent 0–2, Conor O'Neill 0–1, Conor Turbitt 0–1, Stefan Campbell 0–1, Jarlath Óg Burns 0–1	Stadium: Kingspan Breffni; Referee: Diarmuid Boylan

=== Knockout stage ===
14 January 2023 Semi-final	Cavan	0–10 – 0–15	Tyrone	Cavan
17:00 IST (UTC)	Oisin Brady 0–4 (0–3f), Raymond Galligan 0–1 (0–1f), Brandon Boylan 0–1 (0–1m), Killian Clarke 0–1 (0–1m), Gerard Smith 0–1, Cian Madden 0–1, Dara McVeety 0–1	Report	Darragh Canavan 0–4, Cathal McShane 0–3, Michael McKernan 0–2, Rory Donnelly 0–1, Richie Donnelly 0–1, Peter Óg McCartan 0–1, Liam Nugent 0–1, Niall Sludden 0–1, Mattie Donnelly 0–1	Stadium: Kingspan Breffni; Referee: Shane Murphy

== National Football League Division 3 ==
Cavan competed in the third division in 2023, having been promoted as champions from Division 4 in 2022. The opening round was a rematch of the 2022 Tailteann Cup final, with Cavan travelling to Mullingar to face Westmeath. Cavan started the league with a three-point win. Cavan won all three of their February matches, beginning with a twelve-point home win over Tipperary on 5 February, and followed this up with another win at the same venue against Longford two weeks later. A seven-point win away to Offaly kept Cavan at the top of the table with four wins from four. On 5 March, Cavan extended their winning run with a comfortable win over Down, all but securing promotion. Cavan suffered their first defeat against Antrim on 18 March, but with results going their way were promoted with a game to spare. Cavan ended the league with a defeat at home to neighbours Fermanagh, who joined the Breffni men in the league final. Cavan won the final by 0–16 to 1–7, claiming back-to-back league titles.

=== League table ===
Pos	Team	Pld	W	D	L	PF	PA	PD	Pts	Qualification
1	Fermanagh	7	6	0	1	114	94	+20	12	Advance to NFL Division 3 Final and promotion to 2024 NFL Division 2
2	Cavan	7	5	0	2	130	94	+36	10	Advance to NFL Division 3 Final and promotion to 2024 NFL Division 2
3	Down	7	5	0	2	129	114	+15	10	
4	Westmeath	7	4	0	3	135	79	+56	8	
5	Offaly	7	4	0	3	105	115	−10	8	
6	Antrim	7	2	0	5	124	158	−34	4	
7	Longford	7	1	1	5	104	142	−38	3	Relegation to 2024 NFL Division 4
8	Tipperary	7	0	1	6	83	128	−45	1	Relegation to 2024 NFL Division 4

Source: GAA
Rules for classification: Tiebreakers

=== Matches ===
29 January 2023 Round 1	Westmeath	1–6 – 0–12	Cavan	Mullingar
14:00 IST (UTC)	Ronan Wallace 1–0, John Heslin 0–2 (0–2f), Lorcan Dolan 0–2, Shane Dempsey 0–1, Ronan O'Toole 0–1	Report	Raymond Galligan 0–3 (0–3f), Oisin Brady 0–2 (0–2f), Ryan O'Neill 0–2 (0–1m), Dara McVeety 0–2, Ciarán Brady 0–1 (0–1m), Martin Reilly 0–1, Padraig Faulkner 0–1	Stadium: TEG Cusack Park; Referee: Seamus Mulhare

5 February 2023 Round 2	Cavan	1–19 – 1–7	Tipperary	Cavan
14:00 IST (UTC)	Oisin Brady 0–7 (0–4f, 0–1m), Ryan O'Neill 1–2 (0–1m), Dara McVeety 0–3, Brandon Boylan 0–2, Raymond Galligan 0–1 (0–1 '45), Martin Reilly 0–1, Tiarnan Madden 0–1, Niall Carolan 0–1, Paddy Lynch 0–1	Report	Jack Kennedy 0–5 (0–4f, 0–1 '45), Sean O'Connor 1–1 (0–1m), Mikey O'Shea 0–1	Stadium: Kingspan Breffni; Referee: Barry Judge

19 February 2023 Round 3	Cavan	1–19 – 0–11	Longford	Cavan
14:00 IST (UTC)	Oisin Brady 1–2 (0–2f), Conor Madden 0–4, Cian Madden 0–3, Paddy Lynch 0–3, Brandon Boylan 0–2, Gerard Smith 0–2, Padraig Faulkner 0–1, Dara McVeety 0–1, David Brady 0–1	Report	Robbie Smyth 0–3 (0–2f, 0–1m), David McGivney 0–2 (0–2f), Joe Hagan 0–2, Liam Connerton 0–2, Dessie Reynolds 0–1, Andrew Farrell 0–1	Stadium: Kingspan Breffni; Referee: Kevin Faloon

26 February 2023 Round 4	Offaly	0–14 – 0–21	Cavan	Tullamore
14:00 IST (UTC)	Dylan Hyland 0–6 (0–4f), Anton Sullivan 0–2 (0–1f, 0–1m), Peter Cunningham 0–1 (0–1f), Ruairi McNamee 0–1 (0–1f), Declan Hogan 0–1, Jack McEvoy 0–1, Joe Maher 0–1, Bernard Allen 0–1	Report	Paddy Lynch 0–10 (0–7f), Brandon Boylan 0–2, Ryan O'Neill 0–2, Jonathan McCabe 0–2, Raymond Galligan 0–1 (0-1f), David Brady 0–1, Gerard Smith 0–1, Cian Madden 0–1, Conor Madden 0–1	Stadium: Glenisk O'Connor Park; Referee: John Gilmartin

5 March 2023 Round 5	Cavan	2–14 – 1–10	Down	Cavan
14:00 IST (UTC)	Paddy Lynch 2–5 (0–4f), Dara McVeety 0–2 (0–1m), Gearóid McKiernan 0–2 (0–1f), Cian Madden 0–2, Raymond Galligan 0–1 (0–1f), Brandon Boylan 0–1, James Smith 0–1	Report	Pat Havern 0–5 (0–3f), Andrew Gilmore 0–3 (0–3f), Miceal Rooney 1–0, Ryan McEvoy 0–1 (0–1f), Donagh McAleenan 0–1 (0–1m)	Stadium: Kingspan Breffni; Referee: Paddy Neilan

18 March 2023 Round 6	Antrim	1–17 – 2–12	Cavan	Belfast
14:00 IST (UTC)	Odhrán Eastwood 0–6 (0–2f), Patrick McBride 0–5, Ruairi McCann (Aghagallon) 1–0, Dominic McEnhill 0–2, Ruairi McCann (Creggan) 0–1 (0–1f), Patrick McCormick 0–1, Marc Jordan 0–1, Seamus McGarry 0–1	Report	Conor Madden 1–2, Paddy Lynch 1–1, Cian Madden 0–3, Raymond Galligan 0–2 (0–1f, 0–1 '45), Gearóid McKiernan 0–2 (0–2f), Jack McKenna 0–1, Conor Smith 0–1	Stadium: Corrigan Park; Referee: Kieran Eannetta

26 March 2023 Round 7	Cavan	2–9 – 1–14	Fermanagh	Cavan
14:00 IST (UTC+1)	Oisin Brady 0–5 (0–5f), Jonathan McCabe 1–0, Jack McKenna 1–0, Gearóid McKiernan 0–2 (0–1f), Raymond Galligan 0–1 (0–1 '45), Ryan O'Neill 0–1	Report	Ultán Kelm 1–3, Ryan Lyons 0–3 (0–2f), Ryan Jones 0–3, Darragh McGurn 0–2, Sean Quigley 0–1 (0–1m), Aidan Breen 0–1, Ronan McCaffrey 0–1	Stadium: Kingspan Breffni; Referee: Thomas Murphy

=== League Final ===
1 April 2023 Final	Fermanagh	1–7 – 0–16	Cavan	Dublin
19:30 IST (UTC+1)	Ryan Lyons 0–3 (0–2f), Darragh McGurn 1–0, Seán McNally 0–1 (0–1f), Aidan Breen 0–1, Ryan Jones 0–1, Sean Quigley 0–1	Report	Raymond Galligan 0–4 (0–2f, 0–2 '45), Paddy Lynch 0–3 (0–2f), Gearóid McKiernan 0–2 (0–1f), Oisin Brady 0–1, Ryan O'Neill 0–1, James Smith 0–1, Dara McVeety 0–1, Conor Smith 0–1, Conor Madden 0–1	Stadium: Croke Park; Referee: Anthony Nolan

== Ulster Senior Football Championship ==
The draw for the provincial championships took place on 15 October 2022. Cavan were drawn to face the winners of the preliminary round match between Armagh and Antrim. Armagh won the preliminary round match to meet Cavan the quarter-finals. The match took place on 22 April in Kingspan Breffni. Armagh won the match by 1–14 to 0–12, sending Cavan to the Tailteann Cup.

=== Championship draw ===
Preliminary round

Quarter-finals

Semi-finals

Final

Fermanagh
2–8

Derry
3–17

Derry
1–21

Monaghan
2–10

Tyrone
1–18

Monaghan
2–17

Derry
1–15 (3)

Armagh
0–18 (1)

Down
2–13

Donegal
1–11

Down
0–12

Armagh
4–10

Cavan
0–12

Armagh
0–20

Armagh
1–14

Antrim
1–8

=== Matches ===
22 April 2023 Quarter-final	Cavan	0–12 – 1–14	Armagh	Cavan
18:00 IST (UTC+1)	Paddy Lynch 0–4 (0–1f, 0–1m), Gearóid McKiernan 0–3 (0–1f), Cian Madden 0–2, Raymond Galligan 0–1 (0–1 '45), Oisin Brady 0–1, Conor Brady 0–1	Report	Conor Turbitt 0–7 (0–3f), Ben Crealey 1–0, Ethan Rafferty 0–1 (0–1 '45), Rory Grugan 0–1 (0–1f), Conor O'Neill 0–1, Greg McCabe 0–1, Shane McPartlan 0–1, Jemar Hall 0–1, Andrew Murnin 0–1	Stadium: Kingspan Breffni; Attendance: 11,527; Referee: Paul Faloon

== Tailteann Cup ==
The draw for the group stage of the Tailteann Cup took place on 2 May 2023. Cavan were drawn into Group 1 with Offaly, Laois and London. Cavan opened the group stage with a nine-point home win over Laois. This was followed up with a six-point win away to London. Cavan ended the group stage with a sixteen-point win over Offaly, sealing their place in the quarter-finals. Cavan were drawn against Down in the quarter-finals. Cavan's season came to an end as Down were five-point winners.

=== Group stage ===
Pos	Team	Pld	W	D	L	PF	PA	PD	Pts	Qualification
1	Cavan	3	3	0	0	75	44	+31	6	Advance to quarter-final
2	Offaly	3	1	1	1	49	56	−7	3	Advance to preliminary quarter-final
3	Laois	3	0	2	1	51	60	−9	2	Advance to preliminary quarter-final
4	London	3	0	1	2	43	58	−15	1	

Source: GAA

13 May 2023 Round 1	Cavan	2–20 – 1–14	Laois	Cavan
16:00 IST (UTC+1)	Paddy Lynch 1–3 (1–0 pen, 0–1f), Gearóid McKiernan 0–4 (0–3f), Gerard Smith 0–3, Jonathan McCabe 1–0, James Smith 0–2, Tiarnan Madden 0–2, Raymond Galligan 0–1 (0–1 '45), Ryan O'Neill 0–1, Oisín Kiernan 0–1, Conor Brady 0–1, Cian Madden 0–1, Ryan Donohoe 0–1	Report	Mark Barry 0–5 (0–3f), Evan O'Carroll 1–2 (0–1 '45), Paul Kingston 0–2 (0–1f), Kieran Lillis 0–2, Eoin Lowry 0–1 (0–1m), Damon Larkin 0–1, Padraig Kirwan 0–1	Stadium: Kingspan Breffni; Referee: Anthony Nolan

20 May 2023 Round 2	London	2–6 – 0–18	Cavan	Ruislip
14:00 IST (UTC+1)	Liam Gavaghan 0–4 (0–4f), Liam Gallagher 1–0, Enda Lynn 1–0, Joshua Obahor 0–1 (0–1f), Daniel Clarke 0–1	Report	Paddy Lynch 0–7 (0–6f), Gearóid McKiernan 0–3 (0–1f), James Smith 0–2, Oisín Kiernan 0–1, Jonathan McCabe 0–1, Tiarnan Madden 0–1, Ryan O'Neill 0–1, Oisin Brady 0–1, Conor Rehill 0–1	Stadium: McGovern Park; Referee: John Gilmartin

3 June 2023 Round 3	Cavan	2–25 – 2–9	Offaly	Longford
15:00 IST (UTC+1)	Brandon Boylan 2–2, Paddy Lynch 0–4 (0–2f, 0–1m), Gearóid McKiernan 0–4 (0–2f), Raymond Galligan 0–3 (0–3f), Oisín Kiernan 0–2, Conor Brady 0–2, Oisin Brady 0–2, Padraig Faulkner 0–1, Ciarán Brady 0–1, Killian Clarke 0–1, Jonathan McCabe 0–1, Conor Moynagh 0–1, Caoimhán McGovern 0–1	Report	Anton Sullivan 1–1, Nigel Dunne 0–3 (0–2f, 0–1 '45), Joe Maher 1–0, Cian Farrell 0–2 (0–1f), Cian Donohoe 0–1, Ruairi McNamee 0–1, Nigel Bracken 0–1	Stadium: Glennon Brothers Pearse Park; Referee: Jerome Henry

=== Knock-out stage ===
17 June 2023 Quarter-final	Cavan	0–15 – 1–17	Down	Cavan
17:15 IST (UTC+1)	Oisin Brady 0–8 (0–4f, 0–2m), Padraig Faulkner 0–2, Gearóid McKiernan 0–1 (0–1f), Oisín Kiernan 0–1, Cian Madden 0–1, Tiarnan Madden 0–1, Brandon Boylan 0–1	Report	Pat Havern 0–5 (0–2f, 0–1m), Rory Mason 0–4 (0–1f), Liam Kerr 0–4, Danny Magill 1–1, Patrick McCarthy 0–1, Ryan Johnston 0–1, Shane Annett 0–1	Stadium: Kingspan Breffni; Referee: Seamus Mulhare
