= 2024 Down county football team season =

Down county football team
2024 season
- Manager: Conor Laverty
- Stadium: Páirc Esler, Newry
- NFL D3: 1st (Runner-up in final)
- Tailteann Cup: Winners
- Ulster SFC: Semi-Final
- Dr McKenna Cup: Group stage

The following is a summary of Down county football team's 2024 season, which is its 121st year.

== Competitions ==
Down will compete in the pre-season McKenna Cup tournament, with the main season consisting of the National Football League Division 3, the Ulster Championship and either the All Ireland Senior Football Championship or the Tailteann Cup.

== Dr McKenna Cup ==
The draw for the 2024 Dr McKenna Cup took place on 14 December 2023.

=== Table ===
Pos	Team	Pld	W	D	L	PF	PA	PD	Pts	Qualification
1	Derry	2	2	0	0	28	23	+5	4	Advance to semi-final
2	Down	2	1	0	1	31	31	0	2	
3	Cavan	2	0	0	2	31	36	−5	0	

Source: Ulster GAA

=== Fixtures ===
6 January 2024 Round 2	Derry	0–13 – 0–10	Down	Derry
18:00 IWT (UTC)	Shane McGuigan 0–3 (0–3f), Paul Cassidy 0–2, Conor Doherty 0–2, Niall Loughlin 0–2 (0–2f), Diarmuid Baker 0–1, Chrissy McKaigue 0–1, Gareth McKinless 0–1, Declan Cassidy 0–1	Report	Pat Havern 0–3 (0–2f), Daniel Guinness 0–1, Odhran Murdock 0–1, Johnny Flynn 0–1, Ceilum Doherty 0–1, James Guinness 0–1, Liam Kerr 0–1 (0–1f), Andrew Gilmore 0–1 (0–1f)	Stadium: Celtic Park; Referee: Enda McFeely

10 January 2024 Round 3	Down	2–15 – 1–15	Cavan	Newry
19:30 IWT (UTC)	Pat Havern 0–5, Rory Mason 1–1 (0–1f), Odhran Murdock 1–1, Oisin Savage 0–2, Pearse McCabe 0–1, Pierce Laverty 0–1, Gareth McKibben 0–1, Liam Kerr 0–1, Jack McCartan 0–1, Pól Quinn 0–1	Report	Oisin Brady 0–7, Brían O'Connell 1–0, Paddy Lynch 0–3 (0–1f, 0–1 '45), James Galligan 0–1, Padraig Faulkner 0–1, Tiarnan Madden 0–1, James Smith 0–1, Jack Tully 0–1	Stadium: Páirc Esler; Referee: Diarmuid Boylan

== National Football League Division 3 ==
Down will compete in Division Three of the National League in 2024. The fixtures were confirmed on 6 December 2023.

=== Fixtures ===
Win Draw Loss Postponed/Cancelled

Date	Round	Home	Score	Away	Ground	Ref
Saturday 28 January	Group	Wicklow	0-13 v 0-18	Down	Aughrim County Ground	
Saturday 3 February	Group	Down	3-16 v 0-09	Limerick	Páirc Esler, Newry	
Sunday 18 February	Group	Antrim	1-06 v 1-15	Down	Corrigan Park	
Saturday 24 February	Group	Down	4-12 v 2-14	Offaly	Páirc Esler, Newry	
Sunday 3 March	Group	Down	2-17 v 1-08	Sligo	Páirc Esler, Newry	
Sunday 17 March	Group	Westmeath	0-13 v 1-10	Down	Cusack Park, Mullingar	
Sunday 24 March	Group	Down	3-15 v 1-10	Clare	Páirc Esler, Newry	
Saturday 30 March	Final	Down	0-13 v 2-10	Westmeath	Croke Park, Dublin	

=== Table ===
Pos	Team	Pld	W	D	L	PF	PA	PD	Pts	Qualification
1	Down	7	6	1	0	145	88	+57	13	Advance to NFL Division 3 Final and promotion to 2025 NFL Division 2
2	Westmeath	7	5	1	1	95	83	+12	11	Advance to NFL Division 3 Final and promotion to 2025 NFL Division 2
3	Clare	7	5	0	2	106	95	+11	10	
4	Sligo	7	4	1	2	103	96	+7	9	
5	Antrim	7	3	0	4	94	106	−12	6	
6	Offaly	7	2	1	4	111	100	+11	5	
7	Wicklow	7	1	0	6	78	126	−48	2	Relegation to 2025 NFL Division 4
8	Limerick	7	0	0	7	77	115	−38	0	Relegation to 2025 NFL Division 4

Source: GAA.ie
Rules for classification: Tiebreakers

=== Reports ===
28 January 2024
14:00
Round 1

Wicklow	0-13 - 0-18	Down
Chris O’Brien (0-05), Kevin Quinn (0-04), Brian Nesbitt (0-03), JP Nolan (0-01)	Report	Pat Havern (0-05), Daniel Guinneas (0-04), Rory Mason (0-02), Pierce Laverty (0-01), Finn McElroy (0-01), Odhran Murdock (0-01), Liam Kerr (0-03), Oisin Savage (0-01)

Aughrim County Ground, Aughrim
Referee: A Coyne (Westmeath)
3 February 2024
18:00
Round 2

Down	3-16 - 0-09	Limerick
Odhran Murdock (2-03), Pat Havern (0-05), Daniel Guinness (1-01), Liam Kerr (0-03), Shealan Johnston (0-02), Oisin Savage (0-01), Peter Fegan (0-01)	Report	Peter Nash (0-05), Cillian Fahy (0-02), Robbie Childs (0-01), Shane Costello (0-01)

Pairc Esler, Newry
Referee: J Henry (Mayo)
18 February 2024
14:00
Round 3

Antrim	1-06 - 1-15	Down
Dominic McEnhill (0-03), Paddy McAleer (1-00), Michael Byrne (0-02), Joseph Finnegan (0-01)	Report	Pat Havern (0-06), Ceilum Doherty (1-01), James Guinness (0-02), Oisin Savage (0-02), Danny Magill (0-01), John O'Hare (0-01), Odhran Murdock (0-01), Liam Kerr (0-01)

Corrigan Park, Belfast
Referee: E McFeely (Donegal)
24 February 2024
18:00
Round 4

Down	4-12 - 2-14	Offaly
Pat Havern (0-06), Liam Kerr (2-00), Ryan Johnston (1-01), Odhran Murdock (1-01), Miceal Rooney (0-01), Caolan Mooney (0-01), Danny Magill (0-01), Ryan Magill (0-01)	Report	Jack Bryant (1-05), Keith O’Neill (1-02), Anton Sullivan (0-03), Dylan Hyland (0-02), Cathal Flynn (0-01), Jordan Hayes (0-01)

Pairc Esler, Newry
Referee: C Dourneen (Cavan)
2 March 2024
18:00
Round 5

Down	2-17 - 1-08	Sligo
Pat Havern (0-07), Ceilum Doherty (1-02), James Guinness (1-01), Daniel Guinness (0-02), John O’Hare (0-01), Ryan McEvoy (0-01), Liam Kerr (0-01), Danny Magill (0-01), Oisin Savage (0-01)	Report	Sean Carrabine (0-04), Nathan Mullen (1-00), Patrick O’Connor (0-01), Alan McLaughlin (0-01), Cian Lally (0-01), Niall Murphy (0-01)

Pairc Esler, Newry
Referee: B Tiernan (Dublin)
18 March 2024
15:00
Round 6

Westmeath	0-13 - 1-10	Down
R Forde (0-04), L Loughlin (0-03), M Whittaker (0-01), J Dolan (0-01), R Connellan (0-01), J Lynam (0-01), K Martin (0-01), R O’Toole (0-01)	Report	P Havern (0-04), D Guinness (1-00), D Magill (0-01), R Johnston (0-01), O Murdoch (0-01), J Guinness (0-01), R McEvoy (0-01), C Doherty (0-01)

Cusack Park, Mullingar
Referee: J Molloy (Galway)
24 March 2024
14:00
Round 7

Down	3-15 - 1-10	Clare
C Doherty (1-02), D Magill (1-02), P Havern (0-05), O Murdock (1-00, pen), L Kerr (0-03), D Guinness (0-01), R Johnston (0-01), M Rooney (0-01)	Report	C Downes (0-04), A Griffin (1-00), M McInerney (0-02), S Ryan (0-01), E McMahon (0-01), D Coughlan (0-01), D O’Donnell (0-01)

Pairc Esler, Newry
Referee: D Coldrick (Meath)
30 March 2024
14:00
Final

Down	0-13 - 2-10	Westmeath
Pat Havern (0-07), Liam Kerr (0-03), Miceal Rooney (0-01), Oisin Savage (0-01), Odhran Murdock (0-01)	Report	Jonathan Lynam (2-00), Sam McCartan (0-04), Robbie Forde (0-03), David Lynch (0-01), Conor Dillon (0-01), Luke Loughlin (0-01)

Croke Park, Dublin
Referee: B Tiernan (Dublin)

== Ulster Senior Football Championship ==
The draw for the 2024 Ulster Championship took place on 21 October 2023.

=== Fixtures ===
13 April 2024
18:00
Quarter Final

Down	0-13 v 0-09	Antrim
O Savage (0-03), D Guinness (0-02), R McEvoy (0-01), C Doherty (0-01), M Rooney (0-01), O Murdock (0-01), L Kerr (0-01), R Johnston (0-01), P Havern (0-01), S Annett (0-01)	Report	R McQuillan (0-03), R McCann (0-01), M Jordan (0-01), C Hand (0-01), P McBride (0-01), E McCabe (0-01), M Byrne (0-01)

Pairc Esler, Newry
Attendance: 5,429
Referee: B Cassidy (Derry)
27 April 2024
17:15
Semi-Final

Armagh	0-13 v 2-06	Down
R Grugan (0-05), R O'Neill (0-03), A Forker (0-02), A Nugent (0-01), O O’Neill (0-01), J Duffy (0-01)	Report	R Magill (1-01), P Burns (1-00, og.), P Havern (0-02), R Johnston (0-01), D Guinness (0-01), D Magill (0-01)

St Tiernach's Park, Clones
Attendance: 12,116
Referee: L Devenney (Mayo)

=== Bracket ===
Preliminary round

Quarter-finals

Semi-finals

Final

Down
0–13

Antrim
0–9

Down
2–6

Armagh
0–13

Fermanagh
0–9

Armagh
3–11

Armagh
0–20 (5)

Donegal
0–20 (6)

Derry
0–17

Donegal
4–11

Donegal
0–18

Monaghan
1–12

Tyrone
0–16

Cavan
3–12

Cavan
3–16

Tyrone
1–23*

== Tailteann Cup ==
Due to their National League ranking and because they never progressed to the Ulster Championship final, Down will enter the Tailteann Cup in 2024 for the 3rd time. The draw for the 2024 competition was made on 30 April with Down being drawn into Group 4 with Offaly, Limerick and London. Down proceeded onto a second Tailteann Cup final in a row against Laois on 13 July 2024 and went on to win the final by two points winning their first Tailteann Cup.

=== Group 4 ===
Pos	Team	Pld	W	D	L	PF	PA	PD	Pts	Qualification
1	Down	3	3	0	0	78	41	+37	6	Advance to quarter-final
2	Limerick	3	2	0	1	45	41	+4	4	Advance to preliminary quarter-final
3	London	3	1	0	2	46	59	−13	2	Advance to preliminary quarter-final
4	Offaly	3	0	0	3	42	70	−28	0	

Source: GAA

=== Knockout stage ===
Preliminary quarter-finals
Leitrim	1-11
Wicklow	2-15
Limerick	1-18
Tipperary	1-10
Laois	1-13
New York	1-9
Antrim	3-11
London	1-10

Quarter-finals
Down	1-18
Wicklow	0-12
Sligo	2-20
Limerick	0-9
Kildare	0-12
Laois	2-11
Fermanagh	0-11
Antrim	1-11

Semi-finals
Down (a.e.t.)	1-20
Sligo	2-15
Laois	3-12
Antrim	1-13

Final
Down	0-14
Laois	2-06

=== Fixtures ===
11 May 2024
16:00
Group Stage

Down	1-20 v 1-06	Limerick
D Guinness (1-00), P Havern (0-03), E Brown (0-03), R McEvoy (0-01), P Fegan (0-01), O Murdock (0-02), J McGovern (0-02), G McKibben (0-02), G McKibben (0-02), D Magill (0-01), R Johnston (0-01), R McEvoy (0-01), P Fegan (0-01)	Report	P Nash (1-04), J Naughton (0-02)

Pairc Esler, Newry
Referee: C Dourneen (Cavan)
18 May 2024
18:00
Group Stage

London	0-10 v 1-24	Down
Ciaran Diver (0-05), Shay Rafter (0-02), Tighe Barry (0-01), Joshua Obahor (0-01), Ruairi Rafferty (0-01)	Report	Patrick Havern (0-06), Daniel Guinness (0-06), Miceal Rooney (0-05), Odhran Murdock (1-01), Danny McGill (0-02), Conor McCrickard (0-01), Gareth McKibben (0-01), Ryan McEvoy (0-01), Ryan Magill (0-01)

McGovern Park, South Ruislip
Referee: B Tiernan (Dublin)
2 June 2024
13:45
Group Stage

Down	2-22 v 3-13	Offaly
Paul Quinn (0-4), Oisin Savage (1-0), Ryan Magill (1-0), Conor McCrickard (0-3), Danny Magill (0-2), Shane Annett (0-2), James Guinness (0-2), Gareth McKibben (0-2), Shealan Johnston (0-1), Rory Mason (0-1), Ben McConville (0-1), Miceal Rooney (0-1), Caolan Mooney (0-1), Jack McCartan (0-1), Paddy McCarthy (0-1)	Report	Nigel Dunne (0-4), Daire McDaid (1-1), John Furlong (1-0), Cormac Egan (1-0), Keith O'Neill (0-2), Jack Bryant (0-2), David Dempsey (0-1), Lee Pearson (0-1), Cathal Flynn (0-1), Jordan Hayes (0-1)

Breffni Park, Cavan
Referee: K Eannatta (Tyrone)
15 June 2024
16:30
Quarter-final

Down	1-18 v 0-12	Wicklow
P Havern (0-06), S Johnston (0-04), J McGovern (1-00), D Guinness (0-02), L Kerr (0-02), R McEvoy (0-01), D Magill (0-01), O Savage (0-01), C Doherty (0-01)	Report	K Quinn (0-04), M Jackson (0-03), C O'Brien (0-02), P O'Keane (0-01), O McGreynor (0-01), P O'Toole (0-01)

Pairc Esler, Newry
Referee: F Kelly (Longford)
23 June 2024
16:00
Semi-final

Down	1-20 v 2-15 (a.e.t.)	Sligo
Pat Havern (0-07), Odhran Murdock (1-00), Liam Kerr (0-03), Ryan McEvoy (0-02), Pierce Laverty (0-02), Shealan Johnston (0-01), Daniel Guinness (0-01), Miceal Rooney (0-01), John McGovern (0-01), Caolan Mooney (0-01), Danny Magill (0-01)	Report	Sean Carrabine (0-04), Patrick O'Connor (1-01), Canice Mulligan (1-00), Niall Murphy (0-03), Lee Deignan (0-02), Darragh Cummins (0-02), Eddie McGuinness (0-01), Nathan Mullen (0-01), Mark Walsh (0-01)

Croke Park, Dublin
Referee: D O Mahoney (Tipperary)
13 July 2024
15:00
Final

Down	0-14 v 2-06	Laois
Odhran Murdock (0-03), Pat Havern (0-03), Danny Magill (0-02), Caolan Mooney (0-01), Jonny Flynn (0-01), Liam Kerr (0-01), Ryan Johnston (0-01), Peter Fegan (0-01), Shealan Johnston (0-01)	Report	Mark Barry (1-02), Seamus Lacey (1-00), Evan O'Carroll (0-01), Paul Kingston (0-01), Conor Heffernan (0-01), Killian Roche (0-01)

Croke Park, Dublin
Referee: B Griffin (Kerry)
