= 2022 Down county football team season =

Down county football team
2022 season
- Manager: James McCartan Jnr
- Stadium: Páirc Esler, Newry
- NFL D2: 8th (relegated)
- Tailteann Cup: First Round
- Ulster SFC: Quarter-finalist
- Dr McKenna Cup: Group stage

The following is a summary of Down county football team's 2022 season, which was its 119th year. On 24 November 2021, James McCartan Jnr was reappointed Down manager, following a stint in the job between 2009 and 2014.

== Competitions ==
=== Dr McKenna Cup ===
The McKenna Cup returned for the first time since 2019 following a cancelation in 2020 due to the COVID-19 pandemic. The group draw took place on 15 December 2021.

==== Table ====
Pos	Team	Pld	W	D	L	PF	PA	PR	Pts	Qualification
1	Donegal	2	2	0	0	31	26	1.192	4	Advance to semi-final
2	Antrim	2	1	0	1	27	28	0.964	2	
3	Down	2	0	0	2	27	31	0.871	0	

Updated to match(es) played on 15 January 2022. Source: Ulster GAA

==== Fixtures ====
7 January 2022 Round 1	Donegal	1-13 (16) – (14) 2-08	Down	Ballybofey
19:30 GMT (UTC)				Venue: MacCumhaill Park
		Report		Referee: Sean Hurson (Tyrone)

11 January 2022 Round 2	Down	1-10 (13) – (15) 1-12	Antrim	Newry
20:15 GMT (UTC)				Venue: Páirc Esler
		Report		Referee: Margaret Farrelly (Cavan)

=== National Football League Division 2 ===
Down will compete in Division Two of the National League in 2022. The GAA released the fixtures for the league season on 21 December 2021.

==== Fixtures ====
Win Draw Loss Postponed/Cancelled

Date	Round	Home	Score	Away	Ground	Ref
Saturday 29 January	Group	Derry	1-10 - 0-06	Down	Celtic Park, Derry	
Saturday 5 February	Group	Down	0-09 - 1-12	Galway	Páirc Esler, Newry	
Sunday 20 February	Group	Meath	2-06 - 2-06	Down	Páirc Tailteann, Navan	
Saturday 26 February	Group	Down	0-10 - 1-18	Roscommon	Páirc Esler, Newry	
Saturday 12 March	Group	Down	0-14 - 0-15	Offaly	Páirc Esler, Newry	
Sunday 20 March	Group	Cork	1-16 - 1-12	Down	Páirc Uí Chaoimh, Cork	
Sunday 27 March	Group	Down	1-09 - 2-14	Clare	Páirc Esler, Newry	

==== Table ====
Pos	Team	Pld	W	D	L	PF	PA	PD	Pts	Qualification
1	Roscommon	7	5	2	0	123	87	+36	12	Advance to NFL Division 2 Final and promotion to 2023 NFL Division 1
2	Galway	7	6	0	1	141	100	+41	12	Advance to NFL Division 2 Final and promotion to 2023 NFL Division 1
3	Derry	7	5	1	1	110	82	+28	11	
4	Meath	7	2	2	3	93	111	−18	6	
5	Clare	7	2	2	3	88	87	+1	6	
6	Cork	7	2	1	4	112	138	−26	5	
7	Offaly	7	1	1	5	98	133	−35	3	Relegation to 2023 NFL Division 3
8	Down	7	0	1	6	78	115	−37	1	Relegation to 2023 NFL Division 3

Updated to match(es) played on 27 March 2022. Source: GAA.ie
Rules for classification: Tiebreakers

==== Reports ====
29 January 2022
18:00
Round 1

Derry	1-10 - 0-06	Down
Conor Doherty (0-01), Padraig McGrogan (0-01), Ciaran McFaul (0-02), Matthew Downey (0-01), Paul Cassidy (0-02), Niall Loughlin (1-00), Shane McGuigan (0-01), Lachlan Murray (0-01), N Toner (0-01)	Report	Andrew Gilmore (0-03), Ruairi McCormack (0-01), Darren O’Hagan (0-01), Barry O’Hagan (0-01)

Celtic Park, Derry
Referee: Paddy Neilan (Roscommon)
5 February 2022
18:00
Round 2

Down	1-10 - 0-06	Galway
Cormac McCartan (0-01), Barry O’Hagan (0-05), Andrew Gilmore (0-03)	Report	Paul Conroy (1-02), Owen Gallagher (0-02), Tomo Culhane (0-01), Rob Finnerty (0-01), Shane Walsh (0-05), Damien Comer (0-01)

Pairc Esler, Newry
Referee: Brendan Cawley (Kildare)
20 February 2022
14:00
Round 3

Meath	2-06 - 2-06	Down
Jason Scully 1-0, Robin Clarke 1-0, Shane Walsh 0-2, Harry Hogan 0-2, Jordan Morris 0-2	Report	Pat Havern 1-3, Andrew Gilmore 1-2 (0-1), Darren O'Hagan 0-1

Páirc Tailteann, Navan
Referee: Noel Mooney (Cavan)
26 February 2022
17:00
Round 4

Down	0-10 - 1-18	Roscommon
Pat Havern 0-4, Andrew Gilmore 0-2, Cory Quinn 0-1, Tiarnan Rushe 0-1, Liam Kerr 0-1, Caolan Mooney 0-1	Report	Conor Cox 0-5, Enda Smith 1-1, Donie Smith 0-4, Cian McKeon 0-2, Eddie Nolan 0-1, Richard Hughes 0-1, Cathal Heneghan 0-1, Ciaran Sugrue 0-1, Ultan Harney 0-1, Ciarán Murtagh 0-1

Páirc Esler, Newry
Referee: Niall Cullen (Fermanagh)
12 March 2022
17:00
Round 5

Down	0-14 - 0-15	Offaly
Barry O’Hagan 0-4, Liam Kerr 0-2, Andrew Gilmore 0-2, Conor Poland 0-1, Daniel Guinness 0-1, Caolan Mooney 0-1, Pat Havern 0-1, Ceilum Doherty 0-1, Niall Kane 0-1	Report	Bernard Allen 0-3, Niall McNamee 0-3, Niall Darby 0-1, Jordan Hayes 0-1, Lee Pearson 0-1, Mark Abbott 0-1, Keith O’Neill 0-1, Dylan Hyland 0-1, Ruairi McNamee 0-1, Anton Sullivan 0-1, Paddy Dunican 0-1

Páirc Esler, Newry
Referee: Barry Judge (Sligo)
20 March 2022
14:00
Round 6

Cork	1-16 - 1-12	Down
Stephen Sherlock 1-7, Cathal O’Mahony 0-3, Colm O’Callaghan 0-2, Daniel Dineen 0-1, John O’Rourke 0-1, Mark Cronin 0-1, Mattie Taylor 0-1	Report	Tiernan Rushe 1-0, Andrew Gilmore 0-3, Pat Havern 0-3, Darren O’Hagan 0-2, Ryan McEvoy 0-1, Ceilum Doherty 0-1, Ryan O’Higgins 0-1, Cory Quinn 0-1

Páirc Uí Chaoimh, Cork
Referee: Brendan Griffin (Kerry)
27 March 2022
14:00
Round 7

Down	1-09 - 2-14	Clare
Corey Quinn 1-1, Andrew Gilmore 0-3, Barry O’Hagan 0-2, Pat Havern 0-1, Liam Kerr 0-1, Niall Kane 0-1	Report	Aaron Griffin 1-1, Eoin Cleary 0-4, Cian O’Dea 1-0, David Tubridy 0-2, Ciaran Russell 0-1, Gavin Cooney 0-1, Darren O’Neill 0-1, Pearse Lillis 0-1, Emmet McMahon 0-1, Joe McGann 0-1, Brendan Rouine 0-1

Páirc Esler, Newry
Referee: Anthony Nolan (Wicklow)

=== Ulster Senior Football Championship ===
The draw for the 2022 Ulster Championship was made on 28 November 2021.

==== Fixtures ====
30 April 2022
16:30
Quarter Final

Monaghan	0-23 - 2-07	Down
Jack McCarron 0-7; Conor McManus 0-4; Gary Mohan 0-3; Rory Beggan 0-2; Kieran Duffy 0-1; Conor Boyle 0-1; Ryan Wylie 0-1; Andrew Woods 0-1; Kieran Hughes 0-1; Shane Carey 0-1; Conor McCarthy 0-1	Report	Pat Havern 1-1; Caolán Mooney 1-0; Barry O’Hagan 0-2; Andrew Gilmore 0-1; Tiarnán Rushe 0-1; Daniel Guinness 0-1; Conor Poland 0-1.

St Tiernach's Park, Clones
Referee: Fergal Kelly (Longford)

==== Bracket ====
Preliminary round 16 April
Fermanagh	2–10
Tyrone	2–17

Quarter-finals; 23/24/30 April, 1 May
Donegal	1–16
Armagh	0–12
Antrim	0–10
Cavan	1–20
Monaghan	0–23
Down	2–7
Tyrone	0–10
Derry	1–18

Semi-finals; 8/15 May
Donegal	2–16
Cavan	0–16
Derry	3–12
Monaghan	0–17

Final; 29 May
Donegal	1–14
Derry	1–16

=== Tailteann Cup ===
Down's entry into the 2022 All-Ireland Senior Football Championship was dependent on their performance in the National League campaign. Because Down got relegated they did not qualify for the All-Ireland Senior Football Championship and instead will play in the inaugural Tailteann Cup. The draw for the first round was made on 15 May 2022 with Down being drawn against Cavan.

==== Fixtures ====
28 May 2022
14:00
Round One

Cavan	0-24 - 1-12	Down
Raymond Galligan 0-7, Gearoid McKiernan 0-6, Paddy Lynch 0-4, James Smith 0-2, Gerard Smith 0-2, Oisin Kiernan (0-1), Edward Donohoe (0-1), Niall Carolan (0-1)	Report	Ruairi O'Hare 1-0, Liam Kerry 0-3, Barry O'Hagan 0-2, Andrew Gilmore 0-2, Ryan Magill, Anthony Doherty (0-1), Odhran Murdock (0-1), Pierce Laverty (0-1), Ruairi McCormack (0-1)

Breffni Park, Cavan
Referee: David Gough (Meath)

==== Bracket ====
Preliminary round 21/22 May
Wexford	2–13
Offaly	3–11
Wicklow	3–16
Waterford	1–10

Round 1; 28/29 May
Leitrim	2–14
Antrim	1–12
Sligo	3–15
London	2–16
Longford	0–12
Fermanagh	1–12
Cavan	0–24
Down	1–12
Offaly	0–18
Wicklow	0–10
Carlow	1–12
Tipperary	1–10
Laois	0–13
Westmeath	1–13

Quarter-finals; 4/5 June
Leitrim	2–16 (3)
Sligo	1–19 (4)
Fermanagh	0–13
Cavan	2–16
Offaly	3–17
New York	0–11
Carlow	2–13
Westmeath	1–21

Semi-finals; 19 June
Sligo	1–14
Cavan	0–20
Offaly	2–16
Westmeath	3–22

Final; 9 July
Cavan	1–13
Westmeath	2–14
