= 2023 Down county football team season =

Down county football team
2023 season
- Manager: Conor Laverty
- Stadium: Páirc Esler, Newry
- NFL D3: 3rd
- Tailteann Cup: Runner-up
- Ulster SFC: Semi-finalist
- Dr McKenna Cup: Semi-finalist

The following is a summary of Down county football team's 2023 season, which was its 120th year. On 9 August 2022, Conor Laverty was appointed Down manager.

== Competitions ==
Down will compete in the pre-season McKenna Cup tournament, with the main season consisting of the National Football League Division 3, the Ulster Championship and the Tailteann Cup.

== Dr McKenna Cup ==
The McKenna Cup group draw took place on 15 December 2021.

=== Table ===
Pos	Team	Pld	W	D	L	PF	PA	PR	Pts	Qualification
1	Down	2	2	0	0	36	25	1.440	4	Advance to semi-final
2	Monaghan	2	1	0	1	27	29	0.931	2	
3	Donegal	2	0	0	2	26	35	0.743	0	

Source: Ulster GAA

=== Fixtures ===
4 January 2023 Group Stage	Monaghan	0-12 – 2-10	Down	Castleblayney
19:30 GMT (UTC)				Venue: St Mary's Park
		Report

8 January 2023 Group Stage	Down	2-14 – 1-10	Donegal	Newry
13:30 GMT (UTC)				Venue: Páirc Esler
		Report

15 January 2023 Semi-Finals	Down	3-09 – 1-15 (2–3 pen)	Derry	Newry
13:30 GMT (UTC)				Venue: Páirc Esler
		Report
		Penalty shootout

== National Football League Division 3 ==
Down will compete in Division Three of the National League in 2023. The GAA released the fixtures for the league season on 8 December 2022.

=== Fixtures ===
Win Draw Loss Postponed/Cancelled

Date	Round	Home	Score	Away	Ground	Ref
Saturday 28 January	Group	Tipperary	1-11 v 2-11	Down	Semple Stadium, Thurles	
Saturday 4 February	Group	Down	2-18 v 2-17	Antrim	Páirc Esler, Newry	
Sunday 19 February	Group	Fermanagh	2-14 v 3-10	Down	Brewster Park, Enniskillen	
Saturday 25 February	Group	Down	1-10 v 0-11	Westmeath	Páirc Esler, Newry	
Sunday 5 March	Group	Cavan	2-14 v 1-10	Down	Breffni Park, Cavan	
Sunday 18 March	Group	Down	1-19 v 1-14	Longford	Páirc Esler, Newry	
Sunday 26 March	Group	Offaly	0-09 v 1-18	Down	O'Connor Park, Tullamore	

=== Table ===
Pos	Team	Pld	W	D	L	PF	PA	PD	Pts	Qualification
1	Fermanagh	7	6	0	1	114	94	+20	12	Advance to NFL Division 3 Final and promotion to 2024 NFL Division 2
2	Cavan	7	5	0	2	130	94	+36	10	Advance to NFL Division 3 Final and promotion to 2024 NFL Division 2
3	Down	7	5	0	2	129	114	+15	10	
4	Westmeath	7	4	0	3	135	79	+56	8	
5	Offaly	7	4	0	3	105	115	−10	8	
6	Antrim	7	2	0	5	124	158	−34	4	
7	Longford	7	1	1	5	104	142	−38	3	Relegation to 2024 NFL Division 4
8	Tipperary	7	0	1	6	83	128	−45	1	Relegation to 2024 NFL Division 4

Source: GAA
Rules for classification: Tiebreakers

=== Reports ===
28 January 2023
18:00
Round 1

Tipperary	1-11 - 2-11	Down
C Sweeney (0-4, 3fs), T Doyle (1-00), M Russell (0-02), D Leahy (0-02), J Kennedy (0-01f), (0-01), S O’Connor (0-01f)	Report	P Havern (1-04, 0-01f, 0-01m), C Francis (1-00), A Gilmore (0-03, 2fs), E Brown (0-02), O Murdock (0-01), B O’Hagan (0-01f)

Semple Stadium, Thurles
Referee: C Maguire (Clare)
4 February 2023
18:00
Round 2

Down	2-18 - 2-17	Antrim
Andrew Gilmore (1-04, 0-02f), Conor Poland (1-00), Odhran Murdock (0-03), Liam Kerr (0-03), Barry O’Hagan (0-03, 0-01f), Pat Havern (0-02), Eamon Brown (0-01), Shay Miller (0-01), Niall Kane (0-01)	Report	Ruairí McCann (2-01), Conor Stewart (0-03), Dominic McEnhill (0-03), Michael Byrne (0-02, 0-01f), Patrick Finnegan (0-02), Ryan Murray (0-02, 0-01f), James McAuley (0-01), Joseph Finnegan (0-01), Adam Loughran (0-01), Ruairí McCann (0-01, 0-01f)

Pairc Esler, Newry
Referee: B Tiernan (Dublin)
19 February 2023
14:00
Round 3

Fermanagh	2-14 - 3-10	Down
Darragh McGurn (0-05,1f), Conor McGee (1-0), Sean Quigley (1-00), Ryan Lyons (0-02f), Ultan Kelm (0-02), Aidan Breen (0-01), Ronan McCaffrey (0-01), Shane McGullion (0-01), Ryan Jones (0-01), Conor McShea (0-01)	Report	Pat Havern (0-5,2f), Odhran Murdock (1-00 pen), Pierce Laverty (1-00), Conor Francis (1-00), Niall Kane (0-01), Shane Annett (0-01), Liam Kerr (0-01f), Shay Millar (0-01), Andrew Gilmore (0-01)

Brewster Park, Enniskillen
Referee: C Dourneen (Cavan)
25 February 2023
18:00
Round 4

Down	1-10 - 0-11	Westmeath
Andrew Gilmore (0-04, 0-01f), Pat Havern (0-03, 0-03f), Odhran Murdock (1-00, 1-00pen), Ceilum Doherty (0-02), Eamon Brown (0-01)	Report	John Heslin (0-06, 0-04f), Senan Baker (0-02), Sam McCartan (0-01), David Lynch (0-01), Conor McCormack (0-01)

Pairc Esler, Newry
Referee: D Gough (Meath)
5 March 2023
14:00
Round 5

Cavan	2-14 - 1-10	Down
Paddy Lynch (2-05, 4f), Gearoid McKiernan (0-02, 1m), Dara McVeety (0-02, 1m), Cian Madden (0-02), Brandon Boylan (0-01), Raymond Galligan (0-1f), James Smith (0-01)	Report	Pat Havern (0-05, 3f), Micheál Rooney (1-0), Andrew Gilmore (0-03f), Donnacha McAleese (0-01m), Ryan McEvoy (0-01f)

Pairc Esler, Newry
Referee: P Neilan (Roscommon)
19 March 2023
19:00
Round 6

Down	1-19 - 1-14	Longford
Liam Kerr (1-05, 1-00pen, 0-03fs), Pat Havern (0-05, 0-02fs), Ryan Johnston (0-02), Miceál Rooney (0-02), Jerome Johnston (0-01), Michael Ireland (0-01), Conor McCrickard (0-01), Niall Kane (0-01, 0-01 '45), Eamon Brown (0-01)	Report	Dylan Farrell (0-05, 0-03fs), Dessie Reynolds (1-01), Michael Quinn (0-01), Jack Macken (0-01), Darren Gallagher (0-01), Daniel Mimnagh (0-01), Oran Kenny (0-01), Keelin McGann (0-01), D O’Brien (0-01), F Sheridan (0-01)

Pairc Esler, Newry
Referee: S Laverty (Antrim)
26 March 2023
14:00
Round 7

Offaly	0-09 - 1-18	Down
Nigel Dunne (0-3, 3f), Bernard Allen (0-2), Cian Donohoe (0-1), Anton Sullivan (0-1), Jack Bryant (0-1), Cian Farrell (0-1, f)	Report	Liam Kerr (1-0), Conor McRickard (0-3), Eugene Branagan (0-3), Ryan Johnston (0-2), Danny Magill (0-2), Pat Havern (0-2), Rory Mason (0-2, 1f), Antony Morgan (0-1), Niall Kane (0-1, f), Ryan McEvoy (0-1), Miceal Rooney (0-1)

O'Connor Park, Tullamore
Referee: S Mulhare (Laois)

== Ulster Senior Football Championship ==
The draw for the 2023 Ulster Championship was made on 15 October 2022.

=== Fixtures ===
23 April 2023
14:00
Quarter Final

Down	2-13 - 1-11	Donegal
P Havern (1-03, 1-0 pen, 3f), R Johnston (0-03, 2m), L Kerr (1-00), D Guinness (0-02), A Gilmore (0-02, 1f), D Magill (0-01), E Brannigan (0-01), C Poland (0-01)	Report	J McGee (1-01), D O Baoill (0-03), C Thompson (0-02, 2f), C O’Donnell (0-02), O Gallen (0-01), S Patton (0-01, ’45), C Ward (0-01)

Pairc Esler, Newry
Referee: B Cawley (Kildare)
30 April 2023
16:00
Semi Final

Down	0-12 - 4-10	Armagh
Pat Havern (0-6), Ryan McEvoy (0-02), Ryan Johnston (0-01), Liam Kerr (0-01), Patrick Branagan (0-01), Andrew Gilmore (0-01)	Report	Ciaran Mackin (1-00), Shane McPartlan (1-00), Rian O’Neill (1-00), Andrew Murnin (1-00), Jason Duffy (0-02), Conor O’Neill (0-01), Aidan Forker (0-01), Jemar Hall (0-01), Rory Grugan (0-02), Stefan Campbell (0-01), Aidan Nugent (0-01), Callum Cumiskey (0-01)

St Tiernach's Park, Clones
Referee: C Lane (Cork)

=== Bracket ===
Preliminary round

Quarter-Finals

Semi-Finals

Final

Fermanagh
2–8

Derry
3–17

Derry
1–21

Monaghan
2–10

Tyrone
1–18

Monaghan
2–17

Derry
1–15 (3)

Armagh
0–18 (1)

Down
2–13

Donegal
1–11

Down
0–12

Armagh
4–10

Cavan
0–12

Armagh
0–20

Armagh
1–14

Antrim
1–8

== Tailteann Cup ==
Due to their National League ranking and because they never progressed to the Ulster Championship final, Down will enter the Tailteann Cup in 2023 for the 2nd time. The draw for the 2023 competition was made on 2 May with Down being drawn into Group B with Meath, Waterford and Tipperary.

=== Group 2 ===
Pos	Team	Pld	W	D	L	PF	PA	PD	Pts	Qualification
1	Meath	3	3	0	0	62	40	+22	6	Advance to quarter-final
2	Down	3	2	0	1	56	29	+27	4	Advance to preliminary quarter-final
3	Tipperary	3	1	0	2	34	62	−28	2	
4	Waterford	3	0	0	3	42	63	−21	0	

Source: GAA

=== Knockout stage ===
Preliminary quarter-finals
Down	1–20
Longford	1–12
Fermanagh	1–9
Laois	1–11
Offaly	2–14
Wexford	1–22
Carlow	0–15
New York	0–10

Quarter-finals
Cavan	0–15
Down	1–17
Limerick	0–14
Laois	1–14
Meath	2–23
Wexford	0–12
Antrim	1–19
Carlow	1–15

Semi-finals
Down	8–16
Laois	2–12
Meath	2–16
Antrim	2–14

Final
Down	0–14
Meath	2–13

=== Fixtures ===
13 May 2023
18:00
Round 1

Down	2–14 – 1–6	Waterford
Pat Havern 0–5 (0–2f, 0–1m), Andrew Gilmore 0–4 (0–2f), Eamon Brown 1–0, Odhran Murdock 1–0, Donagh McAleenan 0–2, Anthony Morgan 0–1, Shealan Johnston 0–1, Eugene Branagan 0–1	Report	Conor Murray 1–0, Jason Curry 0–2 (0–2f), Darragh Corcoran 0–2, Jason Gleeson 0–1 (0–1f), Dermot Ryan 0–1

Pairc Esler, Newry
Referee: Barry Cassidy (Derry)
21 May 2023
13:45
Round 2

Tipperary	0-06 - 2-18	Down
Jack Kennedy, 0-4 (01f), Sean O’Connor 0-2	Report	Pat Havern 0-6 (0-5f), Shealan Johnston 1-1, Danny Magill 0-3, Odhran Murdock 1-0, Ceilum Doherty 0-2, Eamon Brown 0-2 (0-2f), Conor Francis 0-1, Ryan Johnston 0-1, Andrew Gilmore 0-1, Ross Carr 0-1

Semple Stadium, Thurles
Referee: Thomas Murphy (Galway)
3 June 2023
13:00
Round 3

Meath	1–11 – 1–9	Down
Jordan Morris 1–3 (1–0 pen, 0–1m), Daithi McGowan 0–2 (0–1f, 0–1 '45), James McEntee 0–2, Jack Flynn 0–1 (0–1f), Donal Lenihan 0–1 (0–1f), Jack O'Connor 0–1, Matthew Costello 0–1	Report	Pat Havern 0–5 (0–5f), Odhran Murdock 1–0, Liam Kerr 0–2 (0–1f), Niall Kane 0–1 (0–1 '45), Daniel Guinness 0–1

Parnell Park, Dublin
Referee: Fergal Kelly (Longford)
10 June 2023
19:00
Preliminary Quarter-final

Down	1-20 - 1-12	Longford
Pat Havern 0-6 (0-2f), Andrew Gilmore 0-3, (0-1f), Danny Magill 1-0, Rory Mason 0-3 (0-2f), Eugene Branagan 0-2, Ross Carr 0-2 (0-1m), Patrick McCarthy 0-1, Liam Kerr 0-1, Ceilum Doherty 0-1, Donach McAleenan 0-1	Report	Joe Hagan 1-3, Keelin McGann 0-2, Dylan Farrell 0-2, (0-1 45’, 0-1f), Darragh Doherty 0-2 (0-1f), Patrick Fox 0-1, Ryan Moffett 0-1, Dessie Reynolds 0-1

Pairc Esler, Newry
Referee: Anthony Nolan (Wicklow)
17 June 2023
17:15
Quarter-final

Cavan	0-15 - 1-17	Down
Oisin Brady 0–8 (0–4f, 0–2m), Padraig Faulkner 0–2, Gearóid McKiernan 0–1 (0–1f), Oisín Kiernan 0–1, Cian Madden 0–1, Tiarnan Madden 0–1, Brandon Boylan 0–1	Report	Pat Havern 0–5 (0–2f, 0–1m), Rory Mason 0–4 (0–1f), Liam Kerr 0–4, Danny Magill 1–1, Patrick McCarthy 0–1, Ryan Johnston 0–1, Shane Annett 0–1

Breffni Park, Cavan
Referee: Seamus Mulhare (Laois)
25 June 2023
16:00
Semi-final

Down	8–16 – 2–12	Laois
Liam Kerr 3–2, Danny Magill 2–0, Pat Havern 1–3, Rory Mason 1–1 (0-1f), Odhrán Murdock 1–1, Eugene Branagan 0–3, Ceilum Doherty 0–2 (0-1m), Patrick Branagan 0-2, Niall Kane 0–1, Ryan Johnston 0–1	Report	Mark Barry 1–6 (1–0 pen, 4f, 1m), Kevin Swayne 1-0, Eoin Lowry 0–2 (0-1m), Paul Kingston 0–1, Evan O'Carroll 0–1, Killian Roche 0–1, Dylan Kavanagh 0-1

Croke Park, Dublin
Referee: Barry Tiernan (Dublin)
15 July 2023
15:00
Final

Down	0–14 – 2–13	Meath
Pat Havern 0–4 (0–3f), Niall Kane 0–2 (0–1f, 0–1 '45), Liam Kerr 0–2, Ryan Johnston 0–2, Ceilum Doherty 0–1, Odhran Murdock 0–1, Shealan Johnston 0–1, Andrew Gilmore 0–1	Report	Jack O'Connor 1–2, Jack Flynn 0–4, Ronan Jones 1–1, Matthew Costello 0–3 (0–2f), Cathal Hickey 0–2, Jordan Morris 0–1

Croke Park, Dublin
Referee: Noel Mooney (Cavan)
