= Shane McGuigan (Gaelic footballer) =

Irish Gaelic footballer

Personal information
- Native name: Seán Mag Uiginn (Irish)
- Born: 5 November 1997 (age 28)
- Occupation: Primary school teacher

Sport
- Sport: Gaelic football
- Position: Full forward
Club
- Years: Club
- 2015–: Slaughtneil
Club titles
	Football	Hurling
Derry titles	4	10
Ulster titles	2	5
All-Ireland titles	0	0
College
- Years: College
- St Mary's University College
Inter-county*
Years	County	Apps (scores)
2017–	Derry	29 (6–134)
Inter-county titles
- Ulster titles: 2
- All-Irelands: 0
- NFL: 1
- All Stars: 1
- *Inter County team apps and scores correct as of match played 30 June 2024.

Shane McGuigan (born 5 November 1997) is an Irish Gaelic footballer who plays for the Derry county team and plays both football and hurling for his club Slaughtneil.

== Playing career ==
=== College ===
On 17 March 2016, McGuigan was at full forward as St Patrick's College, Maghera faced St Paul's, Bessbrook in the final of the MacRory Cup. McGuigan scored 2–4 as Maghera cruised to a 5–7 to 1–9 victory. In the semi-final of the Hogan Cup against Summerhill College from Sligo, McGuigan top-scored with 1–8, including the winning free in injury time, to send his team into the final. On 2 April, McGuigan was at full forward against St Brendan's College, Killarney in the Hogan Cup final at Croke Park. McGuigan finished with a personal tally of 1–3, but two late goals from David Clifford gave St Brendan's the win.

=== University ===
On 20 February 2019, McGuigan lined out at centre forward as St Mary's University College, Belfast faced University College Cork in the final of the Sigerson Cup. McGuigan kicked four points for 'The Ranch' but UCC were winners by 0–16 to 1–9. At the end of the season, McGuigan was named on the Sigerson Cup team of the year.

=== Club ===
==== Football ====
McGuigan joined the Slaughtneil senior football team in 2015, having been a water-boy for the club's All-Ireland final loss to Corofin on St Patrick's Day. On 5 October, McGuigan played in his first county final, coming on as a substitute in Slaughtneil's one-point win over Eoghan Rua, Coleraine.

On 16 October 2016, McGuigan started a county final for the first time, scoring 1–1 in Slaughtneil's comfortable win over Loup. Slaughtneil went on to face Kilcoo in the Ulster final. Slaughtneil were 0–12 to 0–9 winners, McGuigan top-scoring with 0–5. On 11 February 2017, McGuigan scored 0–3 as Slaughtneil qualified for the All-Ireland final by beating St Vincent's. Slaughtneil faced Dr Crokes in the St Patrick's day final at Croke Park. McGuigan scored a point, with Slaughtneil falling to a two-point defeat.

On 24 September 2017, McGuigan scored 2–4 in the county final win over Ballinascreen as Slaughtneil claimed their fourth title in a row. On 26 November, Slaughtneil were in the Ulster final once more, facing Cavan Gaels. McGuigan scored 1–6 as the Derry men were comfortable winners. On 24 February 2018, Slaughtneil lost the All-Ireland semi-final after extra-time to Nemo Rangers.

After missing out on the county final in 2018 and 2019, Slaughtneil returned to the county final in 2020, facing defending champions Magherafelt. McGuigan captained Slaughtneil and scored two points in the four-point win. Slaughtneil reached the county final in both 2021 and 2022, but lost both finals heavily to neighbours Glen.

==== Hurling ====
McGuigan joined the club's senior hurling team in 2015. He didn't feature in the county final win, but started at corner back in the Ulster final against Cushendall. Cushendall won the match by a point after extra-time.

On 11 September 2016, McGuigan played in his first county hurling final, lining out at wing back in Slaughtneil's ten-point win over Banagher. On 23 October, Slaughtneil became the first Derry club to win the Ulster title, beating Loughgiel Shamrocks by four points in the final. On 25 February 2017, McGuigan was at centre back for the All-Ireland semi-final loss to Cuala.

Slaughtneil won the championship again on 16 September 2017, McGuigan scoring a point in the 2–18 to 0–14 win. They then defended their Ulster title by beating Ballygalget. McGuigan was in the half-back line for the All-Ireland semi-final against Na Piarsaigh on 10 February 2018. Na Piarsaigh were winners by a seven-point margin.

McGuigan scored a point as Slaughtneil beat Banagher once again to win their sixth successive championship title on 30 September 2018. On 29 September 2019, McGuigan played the entire game as Kevin Lynch's were beaten in the county final. Slaughtneil went on to beat Dunloy by eight points in the Ulster final. On 5 January 2020 McGuigan was at centre back for the All-Ireland semi-final against Ballyhale Shamrocks. Ballyhale won the match by 2–24 to 2–19.

Slaughtneil beat Kevin Lynch's in the 2020 final, and defeated the same opposition in the 2021 decider. On 19 December 2021, Slaughtneil won their fourth Ulster title, McGuigan scoring a point in the final win over Ballycran. On 23 January 2022, McGuigan scored a goal in the All-Ireland semi-final loss to Ballygunner.

On 25 September 2022, McGuigan scored four points as Slaughtneil beat Kevin Lynch's once again to win their tenth county championship in a row. On 4 December, McGuigan scored 0–2 in the Ulster final loss to Dunloy. McGuigan didn't feature in Slaughtneil's county final win in 2023, but started the Ulster final against Cushendall. McGuigan scored two points, but Cushendall won the match by 0–20 to 2–10.

=== Inter-county ===
==== Minor and under-21 ====
On 19 July 2015, McGuigan was corner forward on the Derry minor team for the Ulster final against Cavan. McGuigan scored five points as Derry won their first title since 2002. On 23 August, McGuigan scored two points in the All-Ireland semi-final loss to Kerry.

On 11 April 2017, McGuigan was at full forward for the Ulster under-21 final against Donegal. McGuigan scored a point, but received a black card early in the second half, and Donegal ran out comfortable winners. On 26 July, McGuigan was in the half back line as the Derry under-21 hurling team faced Down in the Ulster final, scoring a point in the 3–17 to 1–9 win. McGuigan also played in the All-Ireland semi-final as Derry suffered a heavy defeat to Kilkenny.

==== Senior ====
McGuigan joined the Derry senior football team in 2017. On 28 May, McGuigan made his championship debut as a sub, scoring a free in the loss to Tyrone. On 27 May 2018, McGuigan made his first championship start as Derry lost to Donegal in the quarter-final of the Ulster championship.

On 30 March 2019, McGuigan was at corner forward for the National League Division 4 final against Leitrim, scoring six points in the four-point win. On 19 June 2021, McGuigan scored 0–7, including a sideline, against Offaly in the Division 3 league final. Derry won the match by 0–21 to 1–6. On 11 July, McGuigan scored 0–4 as Derry lost by a point to Donegal, with Donegal taking the lead for the first time in injury time.

On 14 March 2022, Derry faced Roscommon in a Division 2 National league match. McGuigan had scored 0–8 and the teams were level in injury time, when McGuigan was pulled to the ground by Roscommon defender Brian Stack. McGuigan received a second yellow card, preventing him from taking a last-minute free to win the game, and the free was missed. McGuigan was suspended for the next game against Galway, where Derry missed out on promotion to Division 1. On 1 May, McGuigan scored 1–4 as Derry inflicted an eleven-point defeat on reigning All-Ireland champions Tyrone. McGuigan scored seven points against Monaghan as Derry reached the Ulster final. The Ulster final took place on 29 May, with Derry facing Donegal. McGuigan scored 0–6 as Derry claimed an extra-time victory to win their first provincial title since 1998. McGuigan scored 1–8 in the All-Ireland quarter final win over Clare, with all but one point coming from play. Derry's championship came to an end at the semi-final stage, losing by five points to Galway. McGuigan finished the championship as the second-highest scorer, and was nominated for an All-Star award.

McGuigan was named as vice-captain of the Derry team in 2023, with Conor Glass as captain. On 21 January, McGuigan captained Derry to victory in the final of the Dr McKenna Cup, beating Tyrone in the final. Derry secured promotion to Division 1 after winning their first six games, and went on to face Dublin in the Division 2 final on 2 April. McGuigan scored six points, but Dublin won the match by 4–6 to 0–11. In the Ulster Championship, McGuigan scored 2–5 against Fermanagh, and nine points against Monaghan as Derry reached back-to-back provincial finals. On 14 May, McGuigan scored seven points and scored his penalty in the shoot-out as Derry beat Armagh to defend the Ulster title. McGuigan was also named man of the match. On 16 July, McGuigan scored six points as Derry lost the All-Ireland semi-final to defending champions Kerry. After finishing as the championship's top scorer, McGuigan was named on The Sunday Game Team of the Year. McGuigan was later named at full forward on the All-Star team.

Derry started the 2024 season by winning the McKenna Cup for the second year in succession, with McGuigan captaining the winning team. In the 2024 league, Derry topped the table, qualifying for the final against Dublin. McGuigan started the final at full forward, and scored 1–7 as the match ended in a draw after extra-time. McGuigan scored his penalty in the shoot-out as Derry won the league for the first time since 2008.

== Career statistics ==
As of match played 30 June 2024

Team	Year	National League			Ulster		All-Ireland		Total	
Team	Year	Division	Apps	Score	Apps	Score	Apps	Score	Apps	Score
Derry	2017	Division 2			1	0–1	2	0–0	3	0–1
Derry	2018	Division 3			1	0–0	1	0–1	2	0–1
Derry	2019	Division 4			1	1–6	2	1–9	3	2–15
Derry	2020	Division 3			1	0–7	—		1	0–7
Derry	2021	Division 3			1	0–4	—		1	0–4
Derry	2022	Division 2			3	1–17	2	1–11	5	2–28
Derry	2023	Division 2			3	2–21	5	0–31	8	2–52
Derry	2024	Division 1			1	0-04	5	0-22	6	0-26
Career total					12	4–60	17	2–74	29	6–134

== Honours ==
Derry

- Ulster Senior Football Championship: 2022, 2023
- National Football League: 2024
- National Football League Division 3: 2021
- National Football League Division 4: 2019
- Dr McKenna Cup: 2023 (c), 2024 (c)
- Ulster Under-21 Hurling Championship: 2017
- Ulster Minor Football Championship: 2015

Slaughtneil

- Ulster Senior Club Football Championship: 2016, 2017
- Ulster Senior Club Hurling Championship: 2016, 2017, 2019, 2021, 2024
- Derry Senior Football Championship: 2015, 2016, 2017, 2020 (c)
- Derry Senior Hurling Championship: 2015, 2016, 2017, 2018, 2019, 2020, 2021, 2022, 2023, 2024

St Patrick's College Maghera

- MacRory Cup: 2016

Individual

- All Star Award: 2023
- The Sunday Game Team of the Year: 2023
- GAA Higher Education Rising Stars Football Team: 2019
- All Ireland Football Championship Top Scorer: 2023
- National Football League Division 1 Top Scorer: 2024
