= 2017 Dr McKenna Cup =

Gaelic football competition

Tournament details
- Province: Ulster
- Year: 2017
- Trophy: Dr. McKenna Cup
- Sponsor: Bank of Ireland
- Teams: 12

Winners
- Champions: Tyrone (15th win)
- Manager: Mickey Harte
- Captain: Peter Harte

Runners-up
- Runners-up: Derry
- Manager: Damian Barton
- Captain: Enda Lynn

The 2017 Dr McKenna Cup, known for sponsorship reasons as the Bank of Ireland Dr McKenna Cup, was a Gaelic football competition in the province of Ulster for county and university teams.

Twelve teams took part – the nine Ulster county teams and three university teams, i.e. St Mary's University College, Belfast, Queen's University Belfast and Ulster University.

On 28 January 2017, Tyrone won their sixth title in a row, beating Derry by 2-13 to 1-7 in the final.

== Format ==
Group Stage

The teams are drawn into three groups of four teams. Each team plays the other teams in its group once, earning 2 points for a win and 1 for a draw.

Ties are broken by score average (total scored divided by total conceded).

Knock-out Stage

The three group winners, and the best runner-up progress to the semi-finals with the two winners progressing to the final.

== Group stage ==
=== Group A ===
==== Group A Table ====
Team	Pld	W	D	L	Pts	Ave	Notes
Derry	3	2	0	1	4	1.513
Armagh	3	2	0	1	4	1.452
Down	3	2	0	1	4	1.000
Queen's University Belfast	3	0	0	3	0	0.400

==== Group A Rounds 1 to 3 ====
8 January 2017; 14:00; Round 1	Down	1-11 - 1-8	Queen's University Belfast	Downpatrick; Referee: M Farrelly
8 January 2017; 14:00; Round 1		Report		Downpatrick; Referee: M Farrelly

8 January 2017; 14:00; Round 1	Derry	3-10 - 2-12	Armagh	Owenbeg; Referee: N Cullen
8 January 2017; 14:00; Round 1		Report		Owenbeg; Referee: N Cullen

15 January 2017; 14:00; Round 2	Armagh	2-19 - 0-9	Queen's University Belfast	Athletic Grounds; Referee: A Marron

15 January 2017; 14:00; Round 2	Down	0-15 - 0-14	Derry	Páirc Esler; Referee: S Laverty

18 January 2017; 20:00; Round 3	Armagh	1-15 – 2-8	Down	Athletic Grounds; Referee: TBC

18 January 2017; 20:00; Round 3	Derry	2-20 – 0-6	Queen's University Belfast	Owenbeg; Referee: TBC

=== Group B ===
==== Group B Table ====
Team	Pld	W	D	L	Pts	Ave	Notes
Monaghan	3	3	0	0	6	1.706
Fermanagh	3	2	0	1	4	1.559	Best runners-up
St Mary's University College, Belfast	3	1	0	2	2	0.776
Antrim	3	0	0	3	0	0.484

==== Group B Rounds 1 to 3 ====
8 January 2017; 14:00; Round 1	Monaghan	1-13 - 0-15	Fermanagh	St Tiernach's Park; Referee: N Mooney
8 January 2017; 14:00; Round 1		Report		St Tiernach's Park; Referee: N Mooney

8 January 2017; 14:00; Round 1	Antrim	1-13 - 0-15	St Mary's University College, Belfast	Glenavy GAC; Referee: D Mullan
8 January 2017; 14:00; Round 1		Report		Glenavy GAC; Referee: D Mullan

15 January 2017; 14:00; Round 2	Fermanagh	2-13 – 0-13	St Mary's University College, Belfast	Brewster Park; Referee: R Barry

15 January 2017; 14:00; Round 2	Antrim	0-9 – 2-20	Monaghan	Brewster Park; Referee: Ciarán Branagan (Down)
15 January 2017; 14:00; Round 2		Report		Brewster Park; Referee: Ciarán Branagan (Down)

18 January 2017; 20:00; Round 3	Monaghan	1-13 – 0-10	St Mary's University College, Belfast	Iniskeen; Referee: TBC

18 January 2017; 20:00; Round 3	Fermanagh	0-19 – 0-5	Antrim	Brewster Park; Referee: TBC

=== Group C ===
==== Group C Table ====
Team	Pld	W	D	L	Pts	Ave	Notes
Tyrone	3	2	0	1	4	2.103
Cavan	3	2	0	1	4	1.275
Ulster University	3	2	0	1	4	0.873
Donegal	3	0	0	3	0	0.533

==== Group C Rounds 1 to 3 ====
8 January 2017; 14:00; Round 1	Cavan	1-13 - 0-12	Tyrone	Kingspan Breffni, Cavan; Referee: M McNally
8 January 2017; 14:00; Round 1		Report		Kingspan Breffni, Cavan; Referee: M McNally

8 January 2017; 14:00; Round 1	Donegal	4-13 - 2-20	Ulster University	MacCumhaill Park, Ballybofey; Referee: C Dourneen
8 January 2017; 14:00; Round 1		Report		MacCumhaill Park, Ballybofey; Referee: C Dourneen

15 January 2017; 14.00; Round 2	Tyrone	2-17 – 1-7	Ulster University	Páirc Naomh Colmcille, Carrickmore
15 January 2017; 14.00; Round 2		Report		Páirc Naomh Colmcille, Carrickmore

15 January 2017; 14:00; Round 2	Donegal	1-6 – 2-14	Cavan	MacCumhaill Park, Ballybofey
15 January 2017; 14:00; Round 2		Report		MacCumhaill Park, Ballybofey

18 January 2017; 20:00; Round 3	Tyrone	2-23 – 0-6	Donegal	Healy Park, Omagh

18 January 2017; 20:00; Round 3	Cavan	0-15 – 0-19	Ulster University	Kingspan Breffni, Cavan

=== Ranking of runners-up ===
Grp	Team	Pld	W	D	L	Pts	Ave	Notes
B	Fermanagh	3	2	0	1	4	1.559	Best runners-up
A	Armagh	3	2	0	1	4	1.452
C	Cavan	3	2	0	1	4	1.275

== Knock-out Stage ==
=== Semi-finals ===
22 January 2017
Semi-Final

Derry	2-12 – 1-13	Monaghan

Athletic Grounds, Armagh
22 January 2017
Semi-Final

Tyrone	0-14 – 0-11	Fermanagh

St Tiernach's Park, Clones

=== Final ===
28 January 2017
7:00 pm
Final

Tyrone	2-13 – 1-7	Derry
	Report

Páirc Esler, Newry
Referee: S Laverty (Antrim)
