= 2026 Dr McKenna Cup =

Gaelic football competition in Ireland

2026 Bank of Ireland Dr McKenna Cup
Tournament details
- Province: Ulster
- Year: 2026
- Trophy: Dr McKenna Cup
- Sponsor: Bank of Ireland
- Date: 2–17 January 2026
- Teams: 9
- Defending champions: Derry

Winners
- Champions: Donegal (12th win)
- Manager: Jim McGuinness
- Captain: Caolan McGonagle

Runners-up
- Runners-up: Monaghan
- Manager: Gabriel Bannigan
- Captain: Mícheál Bannigan

Other
- Matches played: 11
- Website: Ulster GAA

The 2026 Dr McKenna Cup is a Gaelic football competition for county teams in the province of Ulster.

In September 2025, a unanimous vote of Ulster GAA's Competition Controls Committee favoured the holding of a 2026 edition of the competition. The draw, for what is the centenary edition of the competition, took place in November 2025. The first fixture, between Armagh and Tyrone, was played on a Friday evening, 2 January. The group stages saw one game cancelled due to bad weather, and two results reversed due to ineligible players. Donegal emerged as winners with wins over Antrim, Derry and Monaghan.

== Competition format ==
Group stage The nine teams are drawn into three sections of three teams. Each team plays the other teams in their section once, either home or away. Two points are awarded for a win and one for a draw. The tie-break for teams level on points is points average (total scored ÷ total conceded), instead of the usual points difference.

Knockout stage The winners of the three sections and the best of the runners-up in the three sections compete in the semi-finals with the two winners meeting in the final. Drawn games go to penalty shootouts without extra time being played.

== Group stage ==
=== Section A ===
Pos	Team	Pld	W	D	L	PF	PA	PR	Pts	Qualification
1	Tyrone	2	2	0	0	37	31	1.194	4	Advance to semi-final
2	Down (Note: Armagh defeated Down by 3-10 to 1-10, but the result was reversed due to the fielding of ineligible players.)	2	1	0	1	14	18	0.778	2	
3	Armagh	2	0	0	2	17	19	0.895	0	

Source: Ulster GAA

=== Section B ===
Pos	Team	Pld	W	D	L	PF	PA	PR	Pts	Qualification
1	Monaghan	2	2	0	0	36	30	1.200	4	Advance to semi-final
2	Fermanagh (Note: Fermanagh defeated Cavan by 1-12 to 1-10, but the result was made null and void due to the fielding of ineligible players by both sides; both teams received 0 points.)	2	0	0	2	17	20	0.850	0	
3	Cavan	2	0	0	2	13	16	0.813	0	

Source: Ulster GAA

=== Section C ===
Pos	Team	Pld	W	D	L	PF	PA	PR	Pts	Qualification
1	Derry (Note: The Donegal–Derry game was not played due to harsh weather making roads dangerous. The game was declared a draw and both teams received one point.)	2	1	1	0	22	7	3.143	3	Advance to semi-final
2	Donegal	2	1	1	0	18	7	2.571	3	Advance to semi-final
3	Antrim	2	0	0	2	14	40	0.350	0	

Source: Ulster GAA

=== Ranking of section runners-up ===
Pos	Grp	Team	Pld	W	D	L	PF	PA	PR	Pts	Qualification
1	C	Donegal	2	1	1	0	18	7	2.571	3	Advance to semi-final
2	A	Down	2	1	0	1	14	18	0.778	2	
3	B	Fermanagh	2	0	0	2	17	20	0.850	0	

Source: Ulster GAA

== Knock-out stage ==
=== Semi-finals ===
14 January 2026 Semi-final	Derry	1-16 (18) – (21) 1-18	Donegal	Derry
19:30 GMT (UTC±0)		(HT: 0-10 – 0-07)		Venue: Celtic Park
		Report		TV: YouTube

14 January 2026 Semi-final	Monaghan	1-15 (18) – (16) 2-10	Tyrone	Inniskeen
19:30 IWT (UTC±0)		(HT: 1-10 – 1-06)		Venue: Grattan Park
		Report

=== Final ===
17 January 2026 Final	Donegal	2-17 (23) – (11) 0-11	Monaghan	Omagh
17:00 GMT (UTC±0)		(HT: 1-07 – 0-06)		Venue: Healy Park
	Gls: Shea Malone 2 Pts: Gavin Mulreany 4 (2x2p), Hugh McFadden 2, Conor O’Donnell 2, Jason McGee 2(2p), Turlough Carr 1, Kevin Muldoon 1, Conor McCahill 1, Ryan McHugh 1, Eoin McGeehin 1, Shea Malone 1, Caolan McColgan 1	Report	Pts: Stephen Mooney 2 (1f), Thomas Hughes 2, Ryan Duffy 1, Jason Irwin 1, David Gartland 1, Andrew Woods 1f, Kian Mulligan 1 ('45'), Louis Kelly 1, Eddie Walsh 1	Referee: S Murphy (Armagh)
