= 2016 Dr McKenna Cup =

Tournament details
- Province: Ulster
- Year: 2016
- Trophy: Dr. McKenna Cup
- Sponsor: Bank of Ireland
- Teams: 12

Winners
- Champions: Tyrone (14th win)
- Manager: Mickey Harte
- Captain: Mattie Donnelly

Runners-up
- Runners-up: Derry
- Manager: Damian Barton
- Captain: Cailean O'Boyle

The 2016 Dr McKenna Cup, known for sponsorship reasons as the Bank of Ireland Dr McKenna Cup, was an inter-county and university Gaelic football competition in the province of Ulster.

Twelve teams take part – the nine Ulster county teams and three university' teams i.e. St Mary's University College, Belfast, Queen's University Belfast and Ulster University.

Tyrone won for the fifth year in a row.

== Format ==
Group Stage

The teams are drawn into three groups of four teams. Each team plays the other teams in its group once, earning 2 points for a win and 1 for a draw.

Knock-out Stage

The three group winners, and the best runner-up progress to the semi-finals with the two winners progressing to the final.

== Group stage ==
=== Group A ===
Team	Pld	W	D	L	Pts	Diff	Notes
Tyrone	3	3	0	0	6	+25	Qualified for semi-final
Derry	3	2	0	1	4	+12	Qualified for semi-final
Antrim	3	1	0	2	2	–13
Queen's University Belfast	3	0	0	3	0	–24

=== Group B ===
Team	Pld	W	D	L	Pts	Diff	Notes
Fermanagh	3	3	0	0	6	+25	Qualified for semi-final
Down	3	1	0	2	2	0
St Mary's University College, Belfast	3	1	0	2	2	–7
Donegal	3	1	0	2	2	–18

=== Group C ===
Team	Pld	W	D	L	Pts	Diff	Notes
Cavan	3	2	1	0	5	+16	Qualified for semi-final
Ulster University	3	2	0	1	4	–2
Armagh	3	1	0	2	2	–3
Monaghan	3	0	1	2	1	–11

== Knock-out Stage ==
=== Semi-finals ===
17 January 2016
Semi-Final

Tyrone	1-13 – 0-10	Fermanagh

St. Tiernach's Park, Clones
17 January 2016
Semi-Final

Derry	1-17 – 1-10	Cavan

Athletic Grounds, Armagh

=== Final ===
23 January 2016
7:30 p.m.
Final

Tyrone	1-22 - 1-15 (a.e.t.)	Derry
	Report

Athletic Grounds, Armagh
Attendance: 7,143
