= 2022 Dr McKenna Cup =

Gaelic football competition in Ulster, Ireland

Tournament details
- Province: Ulster
- Year: 2022
- Date: 6–22 January 2022
- Teams: 9
- Defending champions: Tyrone

Winners
- Champions: Monaghan (15th win)
- Manager: Séamus McEnaney
- Captain: Ryan Wylie

Runners-up
- Runners-up: Donegal
- Manager: Declan Bonner
- Captain: Eoghán Bán Gallagher

Other
- Matches played: 12
- Website: Ulster GAA

The 2022 Dr McKenna Cup, known for sponsorship reasons as the Bank of Ireland Dr McKenna Cup, was a Gaelic football competition in the province of Ulster for county teams. It took place in January 2022.

The McKenna Cup was cancelled in 2021 due to the impact of the COVID-19 pandemic on Gaelic games. The 2022 tournament was initially cancelled, but then restored. As in 2020, only county teams will compete, with no college teams. The group draw took place on 15 December 2021. Monaghan were the winners, defeating Donegal in the final.

== Competition format ==
Group Stage

The nine teams are drawn into three sections of three teams. Each team plays the other teams in their section once, either home or away. Two points are awarded for a win and one for a draw. The points-ratio method (points for divided by points against) is used to determine the ranking of teams who are level on section points (as opposed to the more typical scoring differential).

Knock-out Stage

The winners of the three sections and the best of the runners-up in the three sections compete in the semi-finals with the two winners meeting in the final. Drawn games are decided by penalty shoot-out without any extra time being played.

== Group stage ==
=== Section A ===
| Pos | Team | Pld | W | D | L | PF | PA | PR | Pts | Qualification |
|---|---|---|---|---|---|---|---|---|---|---|
| 1 | Donegal | 2 | 2 | 0 | 0 | 31 | 26 | 1.192 | 4 | Advance to semi-final |
| 2 | Antrim | 2 | 1 | 0 | 1 | 27 | 28 | 0.964 | 2 | |
| 3 | Down | 2 | 0 | 0 | 2 | 27 | 31 | 0.871 | 0 | |

Updated to match(es) played on 15 January 2022. Source: Ulster GAA

| 7 January 2022 Round 1 | Donegal | 1-13 (16) – (14) 2-08 | Down | Ballybofey |
| 19:30 GMT (UTC) | | | | Venue: MacCumhaill Park |
| | | | | Referee: Sean Hurson (Tyrone) |

| 11 January 2022 Round 2 | Down | 1-10 (13) – (15) 1-12 | Antrim | Newry |
| 20:15 GMT (UTC) | | | | Venue: Páirc Esler |
| | | | | Referee: Margaret Farrelly (Cavan) |

| 15 January 2022 Round 3 | Antrim | 1-09 (12) – (15) 0-15 | Donegal | Portglenone |
| 13:30 GMT (UTC) | | | | Venue: Kelly Park |
| | | Report | | Referee: Niall Mc Kenna (Monaghan) |

=== Section B ===
| Pos | Team | Pld | W | D | L | PF | PA | PR | Pts | Qualification |
|---|---|---|---|---|---|---|---|---|---|---|
| 1 | Armagh | 2 | 2 | 0 | 0 | 36 | 29 | 1.241 | 4 | Advance to semi-final |
| 2 | Cavan | 2 | 1 | 0 | 1 | 31 | 20 | 1.550 | 2 | |
| 3 | Tyrone | 2 | 0 | 0 | 2 | 23 | 41 | 0.561 | 0 | |

Updated to match(es) played on 15 January 2022. Source: Ulster GAA

| 6 January 2022 Round 1 | Cavan | 0-11 (11) – (15) 1-12 | Armagh | Cavan |
| 19:45 GMT (UTC) | | | | Venue: Breffni Park |
| | | | | Referee: Anthony Marron (Monaghan) |

| 11 January 2022 Round 2 | Cavan | 1-17 (20) – (05) 0-05 | Tyrone | Cavan |
| 20:15 GMT (UTC) | | | | Venue: Breffni Park |
| | | | | Referee: Kevin Faloon (Armagh) |

| 15 January 2022 Round 3 | Tyrone | 1-15 (18) – (21) 2-15 | Armagh | Omagh |
| 13:30 GMT (UTC) | | | | Venue: Healy Park |
| | | Report | | Referee: Paul Faloon (Down) |

=== Section C ===
| Pos | Team | Pld | W | D | L | PF | PA | PR | Pts | Qualification |
|---|---|---|---|---|---|---|---|---|---|---|
| 1 | Monaghan | 2 | 1 | 1 | 0 | 28 | 23 | 1.217 | 3 | Advance to semi-final |
| 2 | Derry | 2 | 1 | 1 | 0 | 29 | 25 | 1.160 | 3 | Advance to semi-final |
| 3 | Fermanagh | 2 | 0 | 0 | 2 | 24 | 33 | 0.727 | 0 | |

Updated to match(es) played on 15 January 2022. Source: Ulster GAA

| 7 January 2022 Round 1 | Derry | 0-12 (12) – (12) 0-12 | Monaghan | Owenbeg |
| 19:45 GMT (UTC) | | | | Venue: Derry GAA Centre of Excellence |
| | | | | Referee: Sean Laverty (Antrim) |

| 9 January 2022 Round 2 | Monaghan | 0-16 (16) – (11) 0-11 | Fermanagh | Clones |
| 13:00 GMT (UTC) | | | | Venue: St Tiernach's Park |
| | | Report | | Referee: Kieran Eannetta (Tyrone) |

| 15 January 2022 Round 3 | Fermanagh | 1-10 (13) – (17) 0-17 | Derry | Roslea |
| 13:30 GMT (UTC) | | | | Venue: Shamrock Park |
| | | Report | | Referee: Enda Mc Feely (Donegal) |

=== Ranking of section runners-up ===
| Pos | Grp | Team | Pld | W | D | L | PF | PA | PR | Pts | Qualification |
|---|---|---|---|---|---|---|---|---|---|---|---|
| 1 | C | Derry | 2 | 1 | 1 | 0 | 29 | 25 | 1.160 | 3 | Advance to semi-final |
| 2 | B | Cavan | 2 | 1 | 0 | 1 | 31 | 20 | 1.550 | 2 | |
| 3 | A | Antrim | 2 | 1 | 0 | 1 | 27 | 28 | 0.964 | 2 | |

Updated to match(es) played on 15 January 2022. Source: Ulster GAA

== Knock-out stage ==
=== Semi-finals ===
BEOSPORT

18 January 2022
19:45 GMT (UTC)
Semi-Final 1

| Armagh | 0-15 (15) – (15) 0-15 (4–5 pen) | Monaghan |
|---|---|---|
(HT: 0-08 – 0-04)
Penalty kicks
| Rian O'Neill; Aidan Nugent; Rory Grugan; Stefan Campbell; Jemar Hall | | Conor McCarthy; Jack McCarron; Shane Carey; Aaron Mulligan; Davy Garland |

Athletic Grounds, Armagh
Referee: Conor Dourneen (Cavan)

BEOSPORT

18 January 2022
19:45 GMT (UTC)
Semi-Final 2

| Donegal | 2-09 (15) – (11) 0-11 | Derry |
|---|---|---|
(HT: 2-05 – 0-06)

MacCumhaill Park, Ballybofey
Referee: Sean Laverty (Antrim)

=== Final ===
TG4

22 January 2022
17:00 GMT (UTC)
Final

Report

| Monaghan | 1-11 (14) – (13) 0-13 | Donegal |
|---|---|---|
(HT: 1-07 – 0-04)

Healy Park, Omagh
Referee: K Brady (Louth)
