= 2023 Dr McKenna Cup =

Gaelic football competition in Ulster, Ireland

2023 Bank of Ireland Dr McKenna Cup
Tournament details
- Province: Ulster
- Year: 2023
- Trophy: Dr McKenna Cup
- Sponsor: Bank of Ireland
- Date: 4–21 January 2023
- Teams: 9
- Defending champions: Monaghan

Winners
- Champions: Derry (12th win)
- Manager: Rory Gallagher
- Captain: Shane McGuigan

Runners-up
- Runners-up: Tyrone
- Manager: Feargal Logan; Brian Dooher
- Captain: Pádraig Hampsey

Other
- Matches played: 12
- Total scored: 25–262
- Top Scorer: Shane McGuigan (1–17)
- Website: Ulster GAA

The 2023 Dr McKenna Cup, known for sponsorship reasons as the Bank of Ireland Dr McKenna Cup, was a Gaelic football competition in the province of Ulster for county teams. It took place in January 2023. The group draw took place on 13 December 2022 in Cookstown. The competition was won by Derry, winning their first McKenna Cup since 2011.

== Competition format ==
Group stage The nine teams are drawn into three sections of three teams. Each team plays the other teams in their section once, either home or away. Two points are awarded for a win and one for a draw.

Knockout stage The winners of the three sections and the best of the runners-up in the three sections compete in the semi-finals with the two winners meeting in the final. Drawn games go to penalty shootouts without extra time being played.

== Group stage ==
=== Section A ===
| Pos | Team | Pld | W | D | L | PF | PA | PR | Pts | Qualification |
|---|---|---|---|---|---|---|---|---|---|---|
| 1 | Down | 2 | 2 | 0 | 0 | 36 | 25 | 1.440 | 4 | Advance to semi-final |
| 2 | Monaghan | 2 | 1 | 0 | 1 | 27 | 29 | 0.931 | 2 | |
| 3 | Donegal | 2 | 0 | 0 | 2 | 26 | 35 | 0.743 | 0 | |

Source: Ulster GAA

| 4 January 2023 Round 1 | Monaghan | 0–12 – 2–10 | Down | Castleblayney |
| 19:30 IST (UTC) | Micheál Bannigan 0–4 (0–2f, 0–1 '45), Conor McCarthy 0–2 (0–2f), Sean Jones 0–2, Stephen O'Hanlon 0–2, Francis Hughes 0–1, Shane Carey 0–1 | Report | Andrew Gilmore 1–2 (0–2f), Odhran Murdock 1–1, Barry O'Hagan 0–3 (0–1f), Michael Ireland 0–1 (0–1m), Donagh McAleenan 0–1, Patrick Branagan 0–1, Rory Mason 0–1 | Stadium: St Mary's Park; Attendance: 2,194; Referee: Conall Roberts |

| 8 January 2023 Round 2 | Down | 2–14 – 1–10 | Donegal | Newry |
| 13:30 IST (UTC) | Pat Havern 0–5, Liam Kerr 1–1, Conor Francis 1–1, Barry O'Hagan 0–2 (0–1f), Anthony Doherty 0–1 (0–1 '45), Patrick Branagan 0–1, Niall Donnelly 0–1, Mark Walsh 0–1, Tom Close 0–1 | Report | Paddy McBrearty 0–5 (0–3f, 0–1m), Daire Ó Baoill 1–0, Jamie Brennan 0–2 (0–1f), Ciarán Thompson 0–1, Johnny McGroddy 0–1, Kane Barrett 0–1 | Stadium: Páirc Esler; Referee: Maggie Farrelly |

| 11 January 2023 Round 3 | Donegal | 2–7 – 0–15 | Monaghan | Ballybofey |
| 19:30 IST (UTC) | Joel Bradley Walsh 1–1, Luke McGlynn 1–0 (1–0 pen), Johnny McGroddy 0–2 (0–2f), Jamie Brennan 0–1 (0–1f), Marty O'Reilly 0–1, Daire Ó Baoill 0–1, Conor O'Donnell 0–1 | Report | Micheál Bannigan 0–6 (0–6f), Rory Beggan 0–2 (0–2f), Sean Jones 0–2, Shane Carey 0–2, Darren McDonnell 0–1 (0–1f), Jack McCarron 0–1 (0–1f), Stephen O'Hanlon 0–1 | Stadium: MacCumhaill Park; Referee: Conor Dourneen |

=== Section B ===
| Pos | Team | Pld | W | D | L | PF | PA | PR | Pts | Qualification |
|---|---|---|---|---|---|---|---|---|---|---|
| 1 | Tyrone | 2 | 1 | 1 | 0 | 27 | 20 | 1.350 | 3 | Advance to semi-final |
| 2 | Derry | 2 | 1 | 1 | 0 | 21 | 17 | 1.235 | 3 | Advance to semi-final |
| 3 | Fermanagh | 2 | 0 | 0 | 2 | 17 | 28 | 0.607 | 0 | |

Source: Ulster GAA

| 4 January 2023 Round 1 | Tyrone | 0–17 – 1–7 | Fermanagh | Omagh |
| 19:30 IST (UTC) | Peter Harte 0–3 (0–3f), Cathal McShane 0–3 (0–2f), Conor Meyler 0–2, Emmet McNabb 0–2, Richie Donnelly 0–1, Dalaigh Jones 0–1, Ryan Jones 0–1, Mattie Donnelly 0–1, Conor Cush 0–1, Niall Sludden 0–1, Liam Nugent 0–1 | Report | Ultán Kelm 1–0, Diarmaid King 0–2 (0–2f), Ryan Lyons 0–1 (0–1f), Conall Jones 0–1 (0–1f), Ronan McCaffrey 0–1, Garvan Jones 0–1, Eoin McManus 0–1 | Stadium: O'Neills Healy Park; Attendance: 2,287; Referee: Martin McNally |

| 8 January 2023 Round 2 | Fermanagh | 1–4 – 0–11 | Derry | Ederney |
| 13:30 IST (UTC) | Garvan Jones 1–2 (0–2f), Johnny Cassidy 0–1, Conor McGee 0–1 | Report | Shane McGuigan 0–6 (0–2f), Niall Loughlin 0–2 (0–1 '45), Lachlan Murray 0–2, Conor Doherty 0–1 | Stadium: St Joseph's Park; Referee: Conor Curran |

| 11 January 2023 Round 3 | Derry | 0–10 – 0–10 | Tyrone | Dungiven |
| 19:30 IST (UTC) | Niall Toner 0–4 (0–3f), Shane McGuigan 0–3 (0–2f), Conor Doherty 0–1, Brendan Rogers 0–1, Lachlan Murray 0–1 | Report | Cathal McShane 0–5 (0–2f), Niall Sludden 0–1 (0–1m), Conor Meyler 0–1, Richie Donnelly 0–1, Brian Kennedy 0–1, Cormac Munroe 0–1 | Stadium: Owenbeg; Referee: Niall Cullen |

=== Section C ===
| Pos | Team | Pld | W | D | L | PF | PA | PR | Pts | Qualification |
|---|---|---|---|---|---|---|---|---|---|---|
| 1 | Cavan | 2 | 2 | 0 | 0 | 33 | 21 | 1.571 | 4 | Advance to semi-final |
| 2 | Armagh | 2 | 1 | 0 | 1 | 38 | 31 | 1.226 | 2 | |
| 3 | Antrim | 2 | 0 | 0 | 2 | 23 | 42 | 0.548 | 0 | |

Source: Ulster GAA

| 4 January 2023 Round 1 | Armagh | 2–20 – 2–8 | Antrim | Armagh |
| 19:30 IST (UTC) | Conor Turbitt 1–2 (0–1m), Joe Sheridan 1–1, Aidan Nugent 0–3 (0–2f), Cian McConville 0–3, Niall McConville 0–2 (0–1m), Conor O'Neill 0–1, Barry McCambridge 0–1, Eoin Woods 0–1, Tiernan Kelly 0–1, Shane McPartlan 0–1, Stefan Campbell 0–1, Justin Kieran 0–1, Niall Smyth 0–1, Jemar Hall 0–1 | Report | Odhrán Eastwood 2–0, Domimic McEnhill 0–5 (0–5f), Ryan Murray 0–1 (0–1f), Colum Duffin 0–1 (0–1m), Dermot McAleese 0–1 | Stadium: Box-It Athletic Grounds; Attendance: 4,510; Referee: Barry McMenamin |

| 8 January 2023 Round 2 | Antrim | 0–9 – 2–10 | Cavan | Portglenone |
| 13:30 IST (UTC) | Dominic McEnhill 0–3 (0–3f), Ryan Murray 0–2 (0–1f), Pat Shivers 0–2, Ruairi McCann 0–1 (0–1 '45), Patrick McBride 0–1 | Report | Oisin Brady 0–7 (0–4f, 0–1m), Martin Reilly 1–0, Brandon Boylan 1–0, Killian Clarke 0–2, Liam Brady 0–1 (0–1f) | Stadium: Kelly Park; Referee: Kevin Faloon |

| 11 January 2023 Round 3 | Cavan | 1–14 – 1–9 | Armagh | Cavan |
| 19:30 IST (UTC) | Oisin Brady 0–3 (0–3f), Dara McVeety 0–3 (0–1m), Ryan O'Neill 1–0, Raymond Galligan 0–2 (0–2f), Brían O'Rourke 0–2 (0–1m), Martin Reilly 0–1, Cian Madden 0–1, Tiarnan Madden 0–1, Brandon Boylan 0–1 | Report | Rory Grugan 0–3 (0–3f), Oisin Conaty 1–0, Aidan Nugent 0–2, Conor O'Neill 0–1, Conor Turbitt 0–1, Stefan Campbell 0–1, Jarlath Óg Burns 0–1 | Stadium: Kingspan Breffni; Referee: Diarmuid Boylan |

=== Ranking of section runners-up ===
| Pos | Grp | Team | Pld | W | D | L | PF | PA | PR | Pts | Qualification |
|---|---|---|---|---|---|---|---|---|---|---|---|
| 1 | B | Derry | 2 | 1 | 1 | 0 | 21 | 17 | 1.235 | 3 | Advance to semi-final |
| 2 | C | Armagh | 2 | 1 | 0 | 1 | 38 | 31 | 1.226 | 2 | |
| 3 | A | Monaghan | 2 | 1 | 0 | 1 | 27 | 29 | 0.931 | 2 | |

Source: Ulster GAA

== Knock-out stage ==
=== Semi-finals ===
| 14 January 2023 Semi-final | Cavan | 0–10 – 0–15 | Tyrone | Cavan |
| 17:00 IST (UTC) | Oisin Brady 0–4 (0–3f), Raymond Galligan 0–1 (0–1f), Brandon Boylan 0–1 (0–1m), Killian Clarke 0–1 (0–1m), Gerard Smith 0–1, Cian Madden 0–1, Dara McVeety 0–1 | Report | Darragh Canavan 0–4, Cathal McShane 0–3, Michael McKernan 0–2, Rory Donnelly 0–1, Richie Donnelly 0–1, Peter Óg McCartan 0–1, Liam Nugent 0–1, Niall Sludden 0–1, Mattie Donnelly 0–1 | Stadium: Kingspan Breffni; Referee: Shane Murphy |

| 15 January 2023 Semi-final | Down | 3–9 – 1–15 (2–3 p) | Derry | Newry |
| 13:30 IST (UTC) | Niall Donnelly 2–0, Barry O'Hagan 0–3 (0–3f), Pat Havern 0–3, Ceilum Doherty 1–0, Pierce Laverty 0–1, Donagh McAleenan 0–1, Liam Kerr 0–1 | Report | Shane McGuigan 0–6 (0–4f), Niall Toner 0–5, Padraig Cassidy 1–0, Lachlan Murray 0–1 (0–1m), Brendan Rogers 0–1, Oisin McWilliams 0–1, Ben McCarron 0–1 | Stadium: Páirc Esler; Referee: Niall McKenna |
| | Penalties |
| | Andrew Gilmore; Rory Mason; Barry O'Hagan; Ceilum Doherty; Odhran Murdock | | Padraig McGrogan; Shane McGuigan; Paul Cassidy; Niall Toner; Conor Doherty |

=== Final ===
| 21 January 2023 Final | Tyrone | 1–5 – 3–11 | Derry | Armagh |
| 18:00 IST (UTC) | Darren McCurry 1–1 (0–1f), Niall Morgan 0–1 (0–1 '45), Liam Nugent 0–1, Niall Devlin 0–1, Cathal McShane 0–1 | Report | Shane McGuigan 1–2 (1–0 pen, 0–1f), Oisin McWilliams 1–1, Niall O'Donnell 1–1, Niall Toner 0–3 (0–2f), Lachlan Murray 0–2, Padraig McGrogan 0–1, Paul Cassidy 0–1 | Stadium: Box-It Athletic Grounds; Attendance: 5,113; Referee: Conor Dourneen |
