= 2024 Dr McKenna Cup =

Gaelic football competition in Ulster, Ireland

2024 Bank of Ireland Dr McKenna Cup

Tournament details
- Province: Ulster
- Year: 2024
- Trophy: Dr McKenna Cup
- Sponsor: Bank of Ireland
- Date: 3–20 January 2024
- Teams: 9
- Defending champions: Derry

Winners
- Champions: Derry (13th win)
- Manager: Mickey Harte
- Captain: Conor Glass

Runners-up
- Runners-up: Donegal
- Manager: Jim McGuinness
- Captain: Patrick McBrearty

Other
- Matches played: 12
- Website: Ulster GAA

The 2024 Dr McKenna Cup, known for sponsorship reasons as the Bank of Ireland Dr McKenna Cup, is a Gaelic football competition in the province of Ulster for county teams. It took place in January 2024.

Derry were the winners, beating Donegal in the final.

== Competition format ==
Group stage The nine teams are drawn into three sections of three teams. Each team plays the other teams in their section once, either home or away. Two points are awarded for a win and one for a draw. The tie-break for teams level on points is points difference.

Knockout stage The winners of the three sections and the best of the runners-up in the three sections compete in the semi-finals with the two winners meeting in the final. Drawn games go to penalty shootouts without extra time being played.

== Group stage ==
=== Section A ===
Pos	Team	Pld	W	D	L	PF	PA	PD	Pts	Qualification
1	Donegal (Note: Donegal received no points for their win over Armagh as they fielded an ineligible player; Armagh did not get the points as they did not make an appeal. For the purposes of points difference, the game was not counted.)	2	2	0	0	15	13	+2	2	Advance to semi-final
2	Armagh	2	1	0	1	17	16	+1	2	Advance to semi-final
3	Tyrone	2	0	0	2	29	32	−3	0	

Source: Ulster GAA
Notes:

3 January 2024 Round 1	Donegal	3–16 – 1–6 (result annulled)	Armagh	Ballybofey
19:30 IWT (UTC)	Oisín Gallen 1–4 (0–1f), Michael Langan 1–4, Kevin McGettigan 1–0, Paddy McBrearty 0–2 (0–2f), Jeaic Mac Ceallabhuí 0–1, Aaron Doherty 0–1, Caolan McGonagle 0–1, Ryan McHugh 0–1, Odhran Doherty 0–1, Peadar Mogan 0–1	Report	Luke McKeever 1–0, Brendan O'Hagan 0–3 (0–3f), Joe Sheridan 0–1, Callum O'Neill 0–1, Cianan Campbell 0–1	Stadium: MacCumhaill Park; Referee: Margaret Farrelly

7 January 2024 Round 2	Tyrone	1–10 – 0–15	Donegal	Omagh
13:00 IWT (UTC)	Darragh Canavan 0–4 (0–3f), Ciaran Daly 1–0, Peter Harte 0–2 (0–2f), Brian Kennedy 0–1, Michael McKernan 0–1, Niall Devlin 0–1, Lórcan McGarrity 0–1 (0–1m)	Report	Oisín Gallen 0–4 (0–2f), Paddy McBrearty 0–3 (0–3f), Jamie Brennan 0–2, Shane O’Donnell 0–2 (0–1m), Odhran Doherty 0–1, Peadar Mogan 0–1, Jason McGee 0–1, Oisin Caulfield 0–1	Stadium: O'Neills Healy Park; Referee: Niall Cullen

10 January 2024 Round 3	Armagh	1–14 – 2–10	Tyrone	Armagh
19:30 IWT (UTC)	Oisín O'Neill 0–7 (0–6f), Peter McGrane 1–1, Cian McConville 0–3 (0–2f), Callum O'Neill 0–1, Joe Sheridan 0–1, Niall Rowland 0–1	Report	Tarlach Quinn 1–0, Dalaigh Jones 1–0, Lórcan McGarrity 0–3 (0–2f), Peter Harte 0–2 (0–2f), Michael McKernan 0–2, Tiarnan Quinn 0–1, Ryan Jones 0–1, Conor Owens 0–1 (0–1f)	Stadium: Box-It Athletic Grounds; Referee: Martin McNally

=== Section B ===
Pos	Team	Pld	W	D	L	PF	PA	PD	Pts	Qualification
1	Derry	2	2	0	0	28	23	+5	4	Advance to semi-final
2	Down	2	1	0	1	31	31	0	2	
3	Cavan	2	0	0	2	31	36	−5	0	

Source: Ulster GAA

3 January 2024 Round 1	Cavan	1–10 – 0–15	Derry	Cavan
19:30 IWT (UTC)	Paddy Lynch 0–5 (0–5f), Gerard Smith 1–0, Oisin Brady 0–2, Padraig Faulkner 0–1, Jason McLoughlin 0–1, Oisín Kiernan (Castlerahan) 0–1	Report	Paul Cassidy 0–4, Niall Toner 0–2 (0–1f), Shane McGuigan 0–2 (0–1f), Ben McCarron 0–2, Diarmuid Baker 0–1, Padraig McGrogan 0–1, Donncha Gilmore 0–1, Ruairí Forbes 0–1, Cahir McMonagle 0–1	Stadium: Kingspan Breffni; Referee: James Lewis

6 January 2024 Round 2	Derry	0–13 – 0–10	Down	Derry
18:00 IWT (UTC)	Shane McGuigan 0–3 (0–3f), Paul Cassidy 0–2, Conor Doherty 0–2, Niall Loughlin 0–2 (0–2f), Diarmuid Baker 0–1, Chrissy McKaigue 0–1, Gareth McKinless 0–1, Declan Cassidy 0–1	Report	Pat Havern 0–3 (0–2f), Daniel Guinness 0–1, Odhran Murdock 0–1, Johnny Flynn 0–1, Ceilum Doherty 0–1, James Guinness 0–1, Liam Kerr 0–1 (0–1f), Andrew Gilmore 0–1 (0–1f)	Stadium: Celtic Park; Referee: Enda McFeely

10 January 2024 Round 3	Down	2–15 – 1–15	Cavan	Newry
19:30 IWT (UTC)	Pat Havern 0–5, Rory Mason 1–1 (0–1f), Odhran Murdock 1–1, Oisin Savage 0–2, Pearse McCabe 0–1, Pierce Laverty 0–1, Gareth McKibben 0–1, Liam Kerr 0–1, Jack McCartan 0–1, Pól Quinn 0–1	Report	Oisin Brady 0–7, Brían O'Connell 1–0, Paddy Lynch 0–3 (0–1f, 0–1 '45), James Galligan 0–1, Padraig Faulkner 0–1, Tiarnan Madden 0–1, James Smith 0–1, Jack Tully 0–1	Stadium: Páirc Esler; Referee: Diarmuid Boylan

=== Section C ===
Pos	Team	Pld	W	D	L	PF	PA	PD	Pts	Qualification
1	Monaghan	2	2	0	0	33	25	+8	4	Advance to semi-final
2	Fermanagh	2	1	0	1	25	27	−2	2	
3	Antrim	2	0	0	2	25	31	−6	0	

Source: Ulster GAA

3 January 2024 Round 1	Monaghan	1–15 – 0–13	Antrim	Castleblayney
19:30 IWT (UTC)	David Garland 1–3 (0–1f), Stephen Mooney 0–5 (0–4f), Sean Jones 0–3 (0–1m), Micheál Bannigan 0–2 (0–2f), Andrew Woods 0–1 (0–1f), Thomas McPhillips 0–1	Report	Dominic McEnhill 0–5 (0–1f, 0–1m), Michael Byrne 0–2 (0–2f), Oran Downey 0–2, Ronan Boyle 0–1, Stephen Beatty 0–1, Conor Hand 0–1, Oisin Doherty 0–1	Stadium: St Mary's Park; Referee: Conor Dourneen

7 January 2024 Round 2	Antrim	1–9 – 1–10	Fermanagh	Ahoghill
13:00 IWT (UTC)	Benen Kelly 1–0, Eunan Walsh 0–2, Oisin Doherty 0–2 (0–1f), Luke Mulholland 0–1 (0–1 '45), Ronan Boyle 0–1, Joseph Finnegan 0–1, Conor Hand 0–1, Marc Jordan 0–1	Report	Lee Cullen 1–0, Garvan Jones 0–2 (0–1f), Ronan McCaffrey 0–2, Sean Cassidy 0–2, Oisin Smyth 0–1, Ultán Kelm 0–1, Diarmaid King 0–1, Conor Love 0–1	Stadium: Fr McGuigan Park; Referee: Christopher Brady

10 January 2024 Round 3	Fermanagh	0–12 – 2–9	Monaghan	Enniskillen
19:30 IWT (UTC)	Ultán Kelm 0–4 (0–2f), Garvan Jones 0–3 (0–1f), Ross Bogue 0–1, Brandon Horan 0–1, Tiarnan Bogue 0–1, Conor Love 0–1, Conor McGee 0–1	Report	Andrew Woods 1–1, Stephen O'Hanlon 1–0, Stephen Mooney 0–2 (0–1f, 0–1m), Joel Wilson 0–2, Kevin Sheridan 0–1 (0–1m), Darren McDonnell 0–1, Barry McBennett 0–1, Jason Irwin 0–1	Stadium: Brewster Park; Referee: Ryan Walsh

=== Ranking of section runners-up ===
Pos	Grp	Team	Pld	W	D	L	PF	PA	PD	Pts	Qualification
1	A	Armagh	2	1	0	1	17	16	+1	2	Advance to semi-final
2	B	Down	2	1	0	1	31	31	0	2	
3	C	Fermanagh	2	1	0	1	25	27	−2	2	

Source: Ulster GAA

== Knock-out stage ==
=== Semi-finals ===
13 January 2024 Semi-final	Armagh	2-07 – 0-17	Derry	Armagh
16:00 IWT (UTC)	Sean Conlon 1-2, Ben Crealey 1-1, Oisin O’Neill 0-3 (0-2fs), Justin Kieran 0-1	Report	Shane McGuigan 0-10 (8fs), Cormac Murphy 0-2, Eoin McEvoy 0-1, Conor Doherty 0-1, Padraig McGrogan 0-1, Dan Higgins 0-1, Paul Cassidy 0-1	Stadium: BOX-IT Athletic Grounds; Referee: Pat Clarke

14 January 2024 Semi-final	Monaghan	0-11 – 4-14	Donegal	Castleblayney
13:00 IWT (UTC)	Stephen Mooney 0-8 (0-5f), Barry McBennett 0-1, Ciaran McNulty 0-1, Gary Mohan 0-1	Report	Oisin Gallen 1-5 (0-1f), Jamie Brennan 1-3, Odhran Doherty 1-0, Ronan Frain 1-0, Karl Molloy 0-2 (0-2f), Paddy McBrearty 0-1, Luke McGlynn 0-1, Ryan McHugh 0-1, Shane O'Donnell 0-1	Stadium: St Mary's Park; Referee: Mark Loughran

=== Final ===
20 January 2024 Final	Derry	0-12 – 0-06	Donegal	Omagh
17:00 GMT (UTC±0)	Shane McGuigan 0-6 (0-6f), Declan Cassidy 0-1, Paul Cassidy 0-1, Conor Doherty 0-1, Niall Loughlin 0-1, Cormac Murphy 0-1, Niall Toner 0-1	Report	Gavin Mulreany 0-2 (0-2f), Paddy McBrearty 0-1 (0-1f), Ryan McHugh 0-1, Daire Ó Baoill 0-1, Ciarán Thompson 0-1	Stadium: O'Neills Healy Park; Referee: Conor Curran (Down)
