= Damian Barton =

Irish Gaelic footballer and manager

Personal information
- Born: 19 May 1962 (age 64) Derry, Northern Ireland
- Occupation: Teacher
- Height: 1.83 m (6 ft 0 in)

Sport
- Sport: Gaelic football
- Position: Centre forward
Club
- Years: Club
- Newbridge
Club titles
- Derry titles: 1
Inter-county
- Years: County
- 1981-?: Derry
Inter-county titles
- Ulster titles: 2
- All-Irelands: 1
- NFL: 2

Damian Barton (born 19 May 1962) is a former Gaelic footballer who played for the Derry county team in the 1980s and 1990s. He has served as manager of Derry senior football team. He was part of Derry's 1993 All-Ireland Championship winning side, also winning Ulster Senior Football Championships in 1987 and 1993. He usually played in the half-forward line. Barton played club football with Seán O'Leary's GAC Newbridge, where he won a Derry Senior Football Championship in 1989. He also writes for The Irish News.

== Playing career ==
=== Inter-county ===
Barton captained Derry to Ulster Minor and Ulster Under-21 Football Championship successes. Both team went on to be runners-up in the All-Ireland Minor and All-Ireland Under-21 Championships.

Barton made his Senior Championship debut in 1981 against Down. He won an Ulster Senior Championship medal with Derry in 1987. Barton added a second Ulster Senior Championship medal in 1993, before going on to win the 1993 All-Ireland Championship after a semi-final victory over Dublin and final defeat of Cork.

=== Club ===
Barton was part of Newbridge's 1989 Derry Senior Football Championship winning side.

== Management career ==
Barton has managed a number of club sides since his retirement from football, including Ballinderry in the late 1990s and An Lúb in 2007. Ballinderry were runners-up in two consecutive Derry Championships while Barton was manager. He was named manager of the UUJ in November 2001. He has also managed Tyrone side Donaghmore. In late 2005 he applied for the position of Derry manager, but the County Board opted for Paddy Crozier instead. He managed Down side Burren in 2008 and Robert Emmet's Slaughtneil in 2010. He was appointed Derry senior manager in September 2015, on a 2-year term.
