= Dr McKenna Cup =

Annual Gaelic football competition

- Current season or competition: 2026 Dr McKenna Cup
- Irish: Corn an Dochtúra Mac Cionnaith
- Code: Gaelic football
- Founded: 1927
- Region: Ulster (GAA)
- Trophy: Dr McKenna Cup
- No. of teams: 9 (since 2020)
- Title holders: Donegal (12th title)
- Most titles: Tyrone (17 titles)
- Sponsors: Bank of Ireland
- Motto: The one good thing about January
- Official website: https://ulster.gaa.ie/boimckennacup/

The Dr McKenna Cup is an annual Gaelic football competition played between counties and universities in the province of Ulster. It is the secondary Gaelic football competition based in Ulster behind the Ulster Senior Football Championship.

Once held in high regard, in recent years the focus of the competition has changed, and some county teams have made use of it as a pre-season "warm up" competition ahead of the National League and Championship.

Since 2016 the competition has been known—for sponsorship reasons—as the Bank of Ireland McKenna Cup.

The competition was suspended for the 2025 season due to fixture congestion but returned in 2026.

== History ==
The cup was donated to the Ulster Council in 1924 by the Most Rev. Dr McKenna, with the first tournament being played in 1926.

When Patrick McKenna, the Roman Catholic Bishop of Clogher (consisting of County Monaghan, much of County Fermanagh and parts of Counties Tyrone and Donegal), presented the McKenna Cup to the Ulster Council in 1925, he was one of only a small group willing at that time to be publicly associated with the GAA in Ulster. Ireland in the 1920s was slowly emerging from war, unrest and change.

When the Ulster Council sought donors for trophies there wasn't a queue to their door with offers. From 1923 the council were actively looking for a donor for their senior championship and in 1925 the treasurer of the council proposed the establishment of a second competition to prepare teams for the championship.

Two loyal GAA stalwarts came to the council's rescue in 1925. JF O Hanlon, owner of The Anglo-Celt newspaper presented a trophy to BC Fay, secretary of the Council. It was decided to use the trophy for the Ulster senior championship and it was first presented to Cavan who won the 1925 Ulster championship. Treasurer O'Duffy was successful in securing a trophy from the bishop of Clogher and the new cup was presented to Council in 1925 although it was not until 1926 that the competition got underway.

The inaugural competition was won by Antrim, defeating Cavan in the final. Tyrone are the most successful team in the tournament with 16 wins. Fermanagh, with four wins, are the least successful of the county teams. The McKenna Cup is, to date, Fermanagh's only senior inter-county title.

=== Addition of universities ===
Until the early 2000s, the competition was purely an inter-county competition, but the Ulster counties allowed the two main Universities in Ulster, Queen's University, and the University of Ulster and St Mary's University College (a college of Queen's University). The stipulation of this was that University teams would have first choice for any player who is eligible to play for both the University team and the county team.

The University teams have, naturally, emerged as among the weaker teams, but are by no means the 'whipping boys' of the competition, having beaten teams such as Antrim in 2007, and the added experience against playing teams of such a high standard is expected to be beneficial to the University teams in the principal Gaelic football competition for Irish universities, the Sigerson Cup. This initiative seems to be bearing fruit, given that the 2007 Sigerson Cup final was contested by Queen's University Belfast (QUB) and the University of Ulster.

2009 saw QUB become the first university side to reach the McKenna Cup final.

=== 2007 Tyrone ineligibility dispute ===
Tyrone caused controversy in 2007 when they fielded four players who had already been selected by University teams. The official rule is that Universities have first choice on players, so in effect, they were fielding ineligible players. Tyrone manager, Mickey Harte, claimed it was the players' own decision to choose to play for the county team over their University. Tyrone were docked two points as a punishment, but this did not affect their progression into the semi-final stage.

Although Tyrone won the final, beating Donegal by 2-09 to 0-05, Tyrone were stripped of their title for fielding the ineligible University players in the match. The players had not been listed on the official team sheet, which was another breach of the rules. However, Tyrone's victory was reinstated upon appeal.

=== 2013 withdrawal of Queen's ===
Ahead of the 2013 competition, Queen's University Belfast withdrew in a controversy over their players being poached by other teams, though Ulster Council President Aogan Farrell had appealed for this practice to stop.

=== County teams only ===
In the 2020 competition, only county teams took part because of a fixture clash with the Sigerson Cup. The competition was cancelled in 2021 due to COVID-19. It was cancelled in 2022 as part of fixture revamps but then reinstated, again with only county teams. The Dr McKenna Cup was not held in 2025 but returned for 2026.

== Roll of honour ==
| # | Team | Wins | Years won |
|---|---|---|---|
| 1 | Tyrone | 17 | 1957, 1973, 1978, 1982, 1984, 2004, 2005, 2006, 2007, 2012, 2013, 2014, 2015, 2016, 2017, 2019, 2020 |
| 2 | Monaghan | 15 | 1927, 1928, 1932, 1934, 1935, 1937, 1948, 1952, 1976, 1979, 1980, 1983, 1995, 2003, 2022 |
| 3 | Derry | 13 | 1947, 1954, 1958, 1960, 1969, 1970, 1971, 1974, 1993, 1999, 2011, 2023, 2024 |
| 4 | Donegal | 12 | 1963, 1965, 1967, 1975, 1985, 1991, 2001, 2002, 2009, 2010, 2018, 2026 |
| 5 | Cavan | 11 | 1936, 1940, 1943, 1951, 1953, 1955, 1956, 1962, 1968, 1988, 2000 |
| 5 | Down | 11 | 1944, 1959, 1961, 1964, 1972, 1987, 1989, 1992, 1996, 1998, 2008 |
| 7 | Armagh | 9 | 1929, 1931, 1938, 1939, 1949, 1950, 1986, 1990, 1994 |
| 8 | Antrim | 6 | 1941, 1942, 1945, 1946, 1966, 1981 |
| 9 | Fermanagh | 4 | 1930, 1933, 1977, 1997 |

== Broadcasting ==
From 2007, the games were broadcast live on Irish language channel, TG4. The 2015 final between Tyrone and Cavan was shown live on BBC Sport NI's red button service and on its website. This suggests that the tournament is held in higher esteem than its counterparts in other provinces, such as the O'Byrne Cup.

== See also ==
- Dr Lagan Cup, former inter-county Gaelic football competition in Ulster
- Ulster Senior Football Championship
- McGrath Cup (Munster)
- O'Byrne Cup (Leinster)
- FBD Insurance League (Connacht)
