= Páirc Esler =

GAA stadium in Newry, Northern Ireland

- Páirc an Iúir ("Newry Park")
- The Marshes
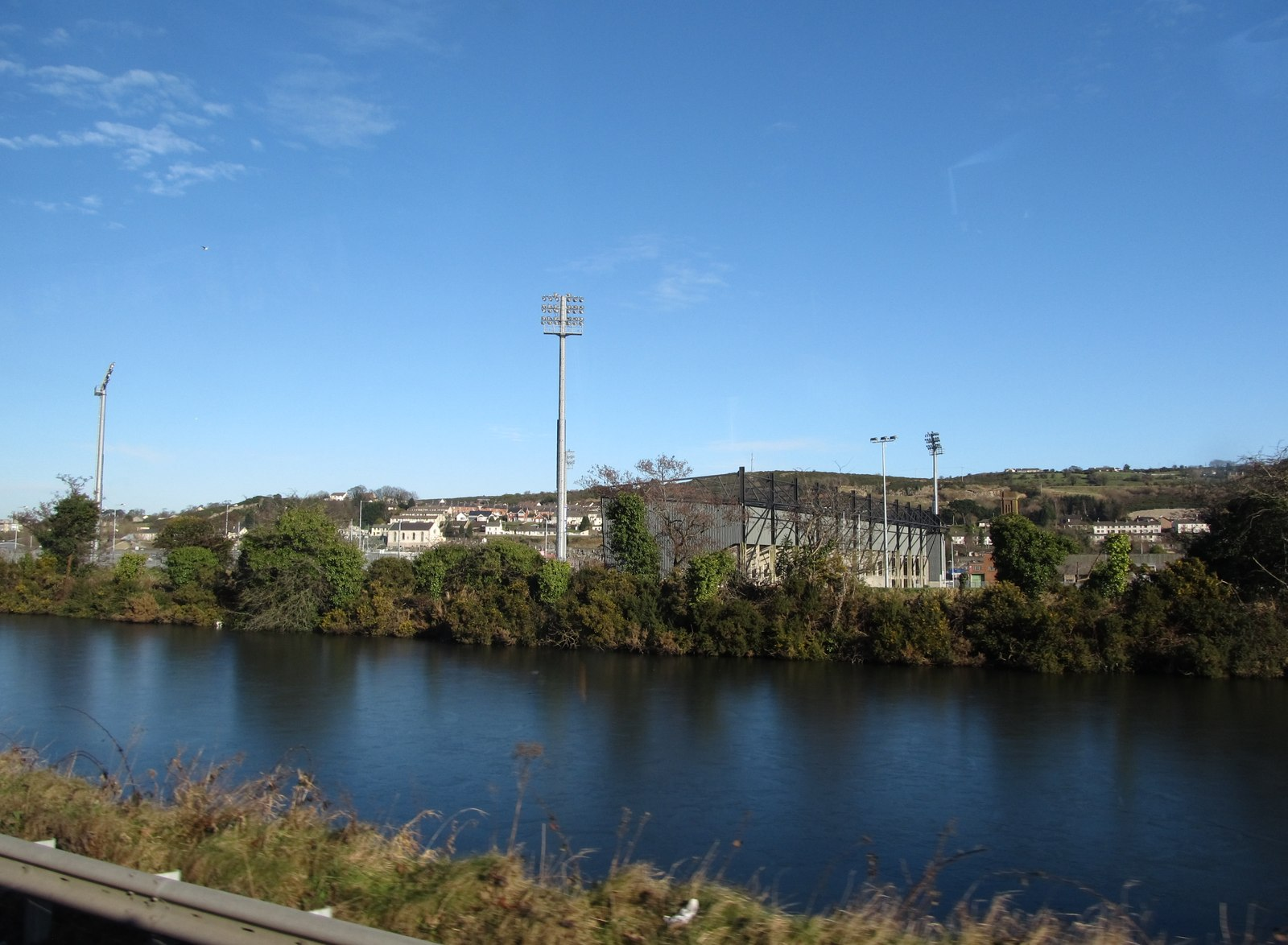

- Location within Northern Ireland
- Address: Newry, BT34 2QX
- Location: Northern Ireland
- Coordinates: 54°9′47″N 6°20′5″W
- Owner: Down GAA & Newry Shamrocks
- Capacity: 20,000
- Field size: 138 × 81 m
- Public transit: Newry railway station Newry Ulsterbus station

Construction
- Renovated: 2006–07

Páirc Esler (/ˌpɑːrk ˈɛslər/ park ESS-lər, Irish: [ˌpˠaːɾʲc ˈɛsˠlˠəɾˠ]; also Irish: Páirc an Iúir [ˈpˠaːɾʲc ənʲ ˈuːɾʲ]) is a Gaelic Athletic Association (GAA) stadium in Newry, Northern Ireland.

While the home ground of Down GAA, most of the ground lies within County Armagh. It is the home of the Down Gaelic football and hurling teams and the Newry Shamrocks GAA club. The ground has a capacity of about 20,000.

== History ==
Páirc Esler is located in the Greenbank Industrial Estate in Newry, built on land adjacent to the Clanrye River. The area is marked on the 1846 Ordnance Survey map as "The Marsh" and was used for Gaelic games, association football and rugby from at least the late 19th century. The pitch was opened as a GAA facility in 1947. Officially called Páirc an Iúir, it was renamed Páirc Esler in 2007 after Archdeacon Hugh Esler, a Catholic priest and Ballynahinch native credited with reinvigorating interest in Gaelic football in Newry in the 1930s–50s, and with securing the grounds.

=== Renovation ===
The ground has undergone major redevelopment work, with new stands, floodlights, and a new pitch all added in 2006–2007. From 1999 to 2004, no senior intercounty championship matches were played at the venue and after the development of a new terrace at the canal end of the ground and a new stand on the south side of the ground, Down hosted the All-Ireland champions, Tyrone, in round 2 of the football championship qualifiers. The following year, both Fermanagh and Derry visited the ground in the qualifiers, Down losing to the latter. The ground was closed after the Down v Armagh game in Division 1B of the National Football League in March 2006 for further development.

=== Reopening ===
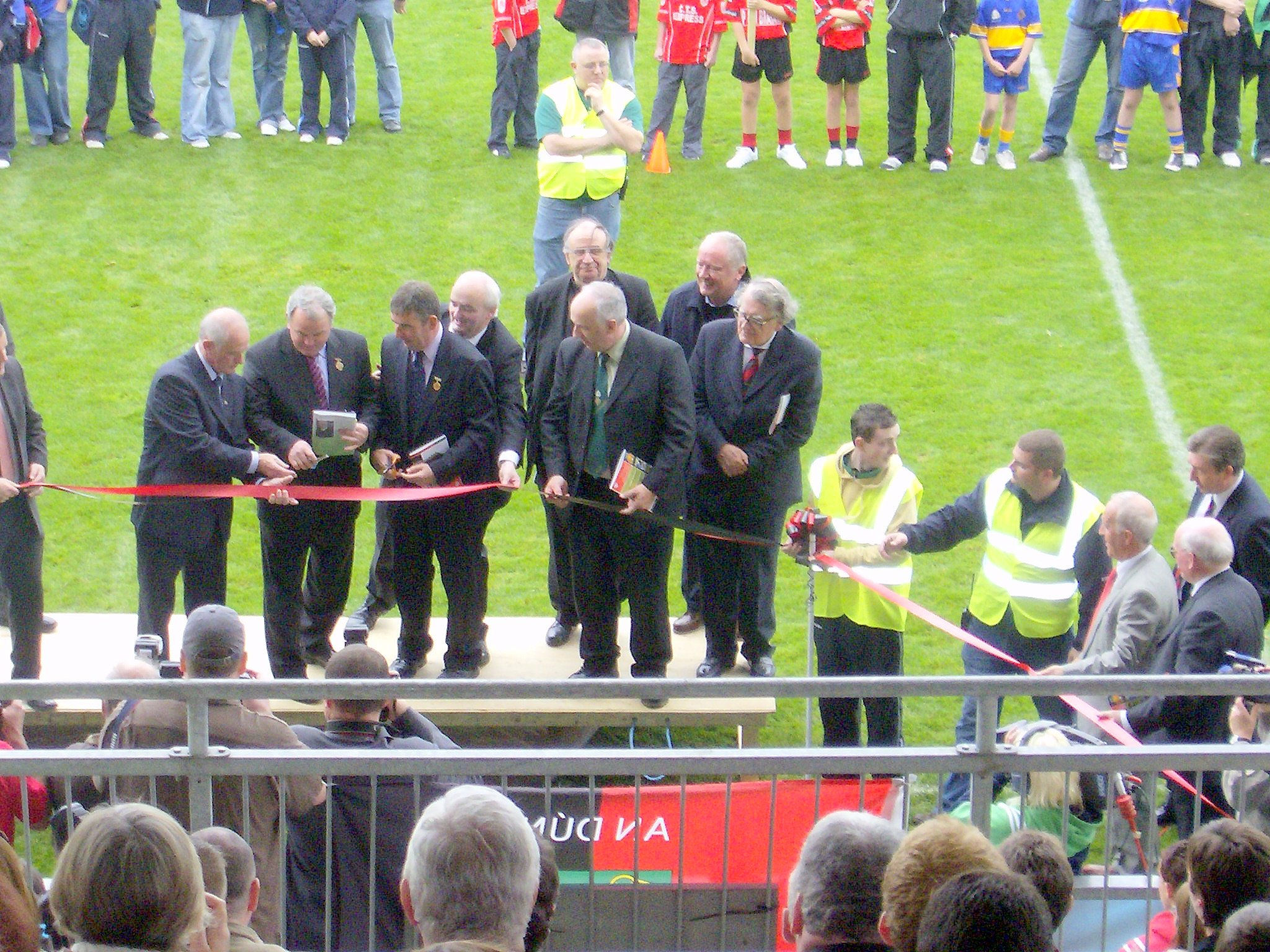
GAA President Nicky Brennan (second from left) cuts the ribbon at the official re-opening of Páirc Esler.

With work now completed on the ground, with a new covered stand and floodlighting facilities, the ground hosted its first Ulster Senior Football Championship Match since 1999 when Cavan visited the stadium for a preliminary round replay on Sunday 20 May 2007, which the home side won 0–15 to 0–11. In June it held a first-round Ulster Championship clash with Monaghan and a first-round qualifier game with Meath – Down lost both games.

On 8 October 2007, the new stand was officially opened by GAA president Nickey Brennan, just before the start of the Senior Football Championship final between Mayobridge and Longstone. The game, which ended in a draw, precipitated a replay that was won by Mayobridge.

The official "switch-on" of the floodlights occurred on 26 October 2007, which was marked by the division one league final between Kilcoo and An Riocht. An Riocht won the game by 3 points.

The ground hosted a number of Dr. McKenna cup matches in 2008 in which Down played and beat Cavan, UUJ and beat Donegal 5–14 to 0–13. In the same year, Down won the final which was played in Casement Park, Belfast.

During 2025, the ground saw updates to its lights and hosted a number of All-Ireland games including, Down v Louth, Dublin v Derry and Down v Galway.

== See also ==
- List of Gaelic Athletic Association stadiums
- List of stadiums in Ireland by capacity
