= Tyrone Under-21 Football Championships =

- Irish: Craobh Peile Faoi 21 Tír Eoghain
- Code: Gaelic football
- Founded: 1973
- Region: County Tyrone, Ulster (GAA)
- Title holders: Grade 1: Donaghmore St. Patrick's (2nd title)
- Most titles: Grade 1: Coalisland Fianna (7 titles)
- Official website: https://tyronegaa.ie/

The Tyrone U-21/U-20/U-19 Football Championships were annual Gaelic football competitions contested by clubs affiliated to Tyrone GAA. The competitions were organised by the Tyrone County Board of the Gaelic Athletic Association from 1973 to 2023.

These now defunct competitions operated as a transitional grade between minor and senior football within Tyrone.

From the 2009/2010 to 2019/2020 seasons, the winners of the Tyrone Under-21 Grade 1 Championship went on to represent the county in the Ulster Under-21 Club Football Championship. During this period, Tyrone clubs enjoyed notable success at provincial level, with Omagh (2012), Clonoe (2014) and Dromore (2019) all winning Ulster titles.

== History ==
In its early years, the competition was contested by both individual clubs and a number of amalgamated teams. These amalgamations were typically formed by neighbouring clubs. Over time, as club structures developed and player numbers increased, the competition became predominantly club-based.

The format of the championship has evolved throughout its history. Initially played as a single competition, it later expanded to include multiple grades (Grade 1, Grade 2 and Grade 3), allowing teams of varying standards to compete more evenly.

In 2021, the competition was regraded from Under-21 to Under-19 level as part of a wider restructuring of Gaelic games age grades within Tyrone, reflecting broader changes to age-grade structures at national level within the Gaelic Athletic Association. The traditional Under-21 grade had been replaced by Under-20 from 2018 onwards, while further reviews of underage grades, including potential changes between Under-19 and Under-20, were ongoing at the time.

The Tyrone County Board regraded the competition from Under-19 to Under-20 level in 2023 along with further changes to other youth age grades.

== Amalgamated teams ==
Over the years, a number of amalgamated teams have competed in various finals, including:

Team	Clubs
Shamrocks	Eglish, Aghaloo, Killeeshil
Killyclogher/Greencastle	Killyclogher, Greencastle
Sean McDermotts	Kildress, Pomeroy
Clann Éireann	Brocagh, Clonoe, Derrylaughan, Derrytresk (Clonoe Parish)
Emmetts	Fintona, Trillick
Cuchullians	Ballygawley, Beragh
Pearse Óg	Donaghmore, Galbally
Cookstown/Rock	Cookstown, Rock
Naomh Mhuire	Edendork, Killyman
St. McCartan's	Augher, Clogher
Na Doirí Óga	Derrylaughan, Derrytresk

== Roll of honour ==
Winners of the competition have included:

Year	Grade 1	Grade 2	Grade 3
U-21 Grade
1973	Shamrocks (Eglish/Aghaloo/Killeeshil)	—	—
1974	Ardboe	—	—
1975	Shamrocks (Eglish/Aghaloo/Killeeshil)	—	—
1976	Sean McDermotts (Kildress/Pomeroy)	—	—
1977	Clann Éireann (Clonoe Parish)	—	—
1978	Emmetts (Fintona/Trillick)	—	—
1979	Ballygawley	—	—
1980	Dungannon	—	—
1981	Derrylaughan	—	—
1982	Ballygawley	—	—
1983	Naomh Mhuire (Edendork/Killyman)	—	—
1984	Coalisland	—	—
1985	Coalisland	—	—
1986	Coalisland	—	—
1987	Coalisland	—	—
1988	Coalisland	—	—
1989	Moortown	—	—
1990	Moortown	—	—
1991	Moortown	—	—
1992	An Charraig Mhór	—	—
1993	Ardboe	—	—
1994	Cookstown	—	—
1995	Dungannon	—	—
1996	Killyclogher	—	—
1997	Clonoe	—	—
1998	An Charraig Mhór	—	—
1999	Errigal Ciaran	—	—
2000	Ardboe	Clann Na nGael	—
2001	Clonoe	Aghyaran	—
2002	Errigal Ciaran	Pomeroy	—
2003	Loughmacrory	Pomeroy	—
2004	An Charraig Mhór	Trillick	—
2005	An Charraig Mhór	Derrylaughan	—
2006	Errigal Ciaran	Moortown	—
2007	Coalisland	Augher	—
2008	Coalisland	Greencastle	Brackaville
2009	Omagh	Greencastle	Brackaville
2010	Eglish †	Rock	Aghyaran
2011	Omagh	Augher	Beragh
2012	Dromore	Derrylaughan	Beragh
2013	Clonoe	Greencastle	Brocagh
2014	Omagh	Donaghmore	—
2015	Donaghmore	Edendork	—
2016	Stewartstown	Kildress	—
2017	Galbally	Moy	—
2018	Dromore	Moy	—
2019	An Charraig Mhór	Coalisland	—
2020	No Competition Held (COVID-19 pandemic)		
U-19 Grade
2021	An Charraig Mhór	Moy	Pomeroy
2022	Omagh	Strabane	Drumquin
U-20 Grade
2023	Donaghmore	Moortown	Na Doirí Óga (Derrylaughan/Derrytresk)

Notes

† Eglish were awarded the 2010 title after Omagh were disqualified.

In some of the early seasons, finals were not played until the following calendar year; this is reflected in the dates listed below.

== Grade 1 Finals ==
Year	Winner	Score	Opponent	Score	Venue	Date
U-21 Grade
1973	Shamrocks	2-10	Killyclogher/Greencastle	0-04	Pomeroy	10/02/1974
1974	Ardboe	3-13	Moortown	1-05	Cookstown	20/06/1975
1975	Shamrocks	1-12	Sean McDermotts	0-11	Omagh	17/08/1975
1976	Sean McDermotts	0-09	Augher	1-05	Beragh	19/09/1976
1977	Clann Éireann	0-09	Drumragh	0-02	Pomeroy	08/01/1978
1978	Emmetts	0-07	Cuchullians	1-02	Omagh	17/12/1978
1979	Ballygawley	2-13	Pearse Óg	1-03	Dungannon	05/08/1979
1980	Dungannon	2-05	Dromore	1-05	Pomeroy	24/08/1980
1981	Derrylaughan	3-06	Coalisland	0-03	Donaghmore	25/10/1981
1982	Ballygawley	5-07	Cookstown/Rock	0-05	Donaghmore	22/08/1982
1983	Naomh Mhuire	1-10	Pomeroy	0-06	Beragh	14/08/1983
1984	Coalisland	1-15	St. McCartan's	1-04	Carrickmore	12/08/1984
1985	Coalisland	1-08	Ardboe	0-08	Pomeroy	01/09/1985
1986	Coalisland	2-06	Dromore	0-03	Carrickmore	23/08/1986
1987	Coalisland	2-13	Dromore	1-06	Omagh	09/08/1987
1988	Coalisland	1-09	Ballygawley	0-09	Eglish	06/11/1988
1989	Moortown	0-11	Donaghmore	0-04	Carrickmore	19/08/1989
1990	Moortown	1-12	Errigal Ciaran	0-06	Gortin	12/08/1990
1991	Moortown	2-14	Derrylaughan	1-10	Pomeroy	25/08/1991
1992	An Charraig Mhór	1-09	Moortown	0-05	Clogher	14/11/1992
1993	Ardboe	2-07	An Charraig Mhór	2-05	Donaghmore	25/09/1993
1994	Cookstown	1-11	Ardboe	0-05	Coalisland	17/09/1994
1995	Dungannon	1-08	Errigal Ciaran	1-05	Killeeshil	16/12/1995
1996	Killyclogher	1-06	Dungannon	0-07	Clogher	22/09/1996
1997	Clonoe	1-14	Naomh Mhuire	2-10	Coalisland	14/12/1997
1998	An Charraig Mhór	0-06	Dungannon	0-01	Pomeroy	20/12/1998
1999	Errigal Ciaran	0-07	Eglish	1-04	Killeeshil	07/11/1999
(r)	Errigal Ciaran	1-07	Eglish	1-05	Killeeshil	21/11/1999
2000	Ardboe	0-13	Errigal Ciaran	0-06	Dungannon	02/12/2000
2001	Clonoe	1-16	Dromore	0-08	Pomeroy	29/08/2001
2002	Errigal Ciaran	2-08	Cookstown	1-06	Carrickmore	20/08/2002
2003	Loughmacrory	3-08	Errigal Ciaran	1-11	Fintona	12/08/2003
2004	An Charraig Mhór	1-11	Clonoe	0-13	Pomeroy	17/08/2004
2005	An Charraig Mhór	3-06	Errigal Ciaran	0-08	Omagh	03/08/2005
2006	Errigal Ciaran	3-09	Coalisland	1-10	Clogher	21/10/2006
2007	Coalisland	2-08	Cookstown	0-13	Ardboe	09/12/2007
2008	Coalisland	1-12	Ardboe	1-10	Dungannon	30/11/2008
2009	Omagh	0-10	Errigal Ciaran	1-06	Omagh	11/10/2009
2010	Eglish	Awarded	Omagh (disqualified)	—	—	—
2011	Omagh	0-15	Donaghmore	1-05	Augher	04/12/2011
2012	Dromore	1-11	Edendork	1-06	Dunmoyle	31/12/2012
2013	Clonoe	1-11	Pomeroy	2-07	Edendork	09/11/2013
2014	Omagh	0-10	An Charraig Mhór	0-06	Loughmacrory	18/10/2014
2015	Donaghmore	0-14	Dromore	0-09	Dunmoyle	05/08/2015
2016	Stewartstown	0-08	Coalisland	0-07	Dungannon	07/08/2016
2017	Galbally	2-12	Loughmacrory	1-13	Omagh	15/10/2017
2018	Dromore	1-13	Dungannon	0-09	Loughmacrory	20/04/2018
2019	An Charraig Mhór	2-09	Dungannon	0-07	Newtownstewart	14/12/2019
2020	No Competition Held (COVID-19 pandemic)					
U-19 Grade
2021	An Charraig Mhór	3-14	Omagh	3-12	Killyclogher	19/07/2021
2022	Omagh	1-09	Killyclogher	1-05	Newtownstewart	20/11/2022
U-20 Grade
2023	Donaghmore	6-18	Carrickmore	1-07	Pomeroy	06/06/2023

== Grade 2 Finals ==
Year	Winner	Score	Opponent	Score	Venue	Date
U-21 Grade
2000	Clann Na nGael	1-12	Fintona	0-06	Omagh	15/10/2000
2001	Aghyaran	1-16	Galbally	0-07	Omagh	29/08/2001
2002	Pomeroy	2-14	Augher	0-16	Beragh	20/08/2002
2003	Pomeroy	1-13	Eskra	0-06	Carrickmore	19/08/2003
2004	Trillick	1-14	Augher	1-10	Eskra	17/08/2004
2005	Derrylaughan	1-16	Moortown	1-10	Coalisland	19/08/2005
2006	Moortown	1-12	Eglish	1-06	Rock	18/11/2006
2007	Augher	0-12	Rock	1-07	Beragh	22/12/2007
2008	Greencastle	2-11	Moortown	0-06	Loughmacrory	13/12/2008
2009	Greencastle	3-08	Gortin	0-10	Killyclogher	25/10/2009
2010	Rock	3-13	Augher	1-18	Beragh	30/01/2011
2011	Augher	3-15	Dungannon	0-07	Augher	04/12/2011
2012	Derrylaughan	0-12	Eskra	0-04	Edendork	23/12/2012
2013	Greencastle	2-15	Coalisland	0-17	Omagh	13/10/2013
2014	Donaghmore	1-11	Drumragh	0-05	Omagh	28/09/2014
2015	Edendork	0-16	Greencastle	1-06	Cookstown	12/08/2015
2016	Kildress	3-09	Greencastle	0-05	Dungannon	07/08/2016
2017	Moy	2-12	Eglish	1-13	Derrytresk	03/12/2017
2018	Moy	4-11	Killeeshil	1-17	Eglish	05/04/2018
2019	Coalisland	2-11	Moy	1-10	Omagh	13/10/2019
2020	No Competition Held (COVID-19 pandemic)					
U-19 Grade
2021	Moy	2-18	Aghyaran	4-11	Fintona	01/09/2021
2022	Strabane	2-10	Moy	1-12	Augher	27/06/2022
U-20 Grade
2023	Moortown	2-09	Fintona	2-07	Killeeshil	11/06/2023

== Grade 3 Finals ==
Year	Winner	Score	Opponent	Score	Venue	Date
U-21 Grade
2008	Brackaville	0-10	Derrytresk	0-09	Edendork	11/10/2008
2009	Brackaville	1-10	Aghyaran	1-10	Killyclogher	26/10/2009
(r)	Brackaville	2-11	Aghyaran	0-09	Dunmoyle	08/11/2009
2010	Aghyaran	0-10	Owen Roes	0-08	Strabane	20/11/2010
2011	Beragh	0-11	Aghyaran	1-07	Drumragh	12/11/2011
2012	Beragh	2-07	Loughmacrory	1-08	Dunmoyle	16/12/2012
2013	Brocagh	1-13	Eskra	3-06	Garvaghey	27/08/2013
2014	No Record Of Competition Held					
2015	No Record Of Competition Held					
2016	No Record Of Competition Held					
2017	No Record Of Competition Held					
2018	No Record Of Competition Held					
2019	No Record Of Competition Held					
2020	No Competition Held (COVID-19 pandemic)					
U-19 Grade
2021	Pomeroy	10-17	Brackaville	1-11	Greencastle	19/07/2021
2022	Drumquin	5-16	Rock	1-17	Clogher	03/08/2022
U-20 Grade
2023	Na Doirí Óga	1-16	Naomh Eoghan	1-14	Kildress	03/05/2023

== U-21/U-20/U-19 Grade 1 titles listed by club, 1973–2023 ==
#	Club	Wins	Years won
1	Coalisland Na Fianna	7	1984, 1985, 1986, 1987, 1988, 2007, 2008
2	An Charraig Mhór Naomh Colmcille	6	1992, 1998, 2004, 2005, 2019, 2021
3	Omagh St. Enda's	4	2009, 2011, 2014, 2022
4	Ardboe O'Donovan Rossa	3	1974, 1993, 2000
4	Clonoe O'Rahilly's	3	1997, 2001, 2013
4	Errigal Ciaran	3	1999, 2002, 2006
4	Moortown St. Malachy's	3	1989, 1990, 1991
8	Ballygawley St. Ciaran's	2	1979, 1982
8	Dromore St. Dympna's	2	2012, 2018
8	Donaghmore St. Patrick's	2	2015, 2023
8	Dungannon Thomas Clarkes	2	1980, 1995
8	Shamrocks	2	1973, 1975
13	Clann Éireann	1	1977
13	Cookstown Fr. Rock's	1	1994
13	Derrylaughan Kevin Barry's	1	1981
13	Eglish St. Patrick's	1	2010
13	Emmetts	1	1978
13	Galbally Pearses	1	2017
13	Killyclogher St. Mary's	1	1996
13	Loughmacrory St. Teresa's	1	2003
13	Naomh Mhuire	1	1983
13	Sean McDermotts	1	1976
13	Stewartstown Harps	1	2016

== U-21/U-20/U-19 Grade 2 titles listed by club, 2000–2023 ==
#	Club	Wins	Years won
1	Greencastle St. Patrick's	3	2008, 2009, 2013
1	Moy Tír na nÓg	3	2017, 2018, 2021
3	Augher St. Macartan's	2	2007, 2011
3	Derrylaughan Kevin Barry's	2	2005, 2012
3	Moortown St. Malachy's	2	2006, 2023
3	Pomeroy Plunketts	2	2002, 2003
7	Aghyaran St. Davog's	1	2001
7	Clann Na nGael	1	2000
7	Coalisland Na Fianna	1	2019
7	Donaghmore St. Patrick's	1	2014
7	Edendork St. Malachy's	1	2015
7	Kildress Wolfe Tones	1	2016
7	Rock St. Patrick's	1	2010
7	Strabane Sigerson's	1	2022
7	Trillick St. Macartan's	1	2004

== U-21/U-20/U-19 Grade 3 titles listed by club, 2008–2023 ==
#	Club	Wins	Years won
1	Brackaville Owen Roes	2	2008, 2009
1	Beragh Red Knights	2	2011, 2012
3	Aghyaran St. Davog's	1	2010
3	Brocagh Emmetts	1	2013
3	Drumquin Wolfe Tones	1	2022
3	Na Doirí Óga	1	2023
3	Pomeroy Plunketts	1	2021
